= Iraq national football team results (unofficial matches) =

List of unofficial matches of Iraq national football team

This article provides details of football matches played by the Iraq national football team which are not recognised as official internationals by FIFA and the AFC and are also not recognised as official by the Iraq Football Association (IFA).

== Results ==
Key
Win
Draw
Defeat

=== 1951–1959 ===
1951

13 April 1951 Friendly	Iraq	5–0	Civil Cantonment (C.C.)	Baghdad, Iraq
	Faraj 40' Lynsdale	Report		Stadium: Al-Kashafa Stadium

27 April 1951 Friendly	Basra XI	1–1	Iraq	Basra, Iraq
	Khalil	Report	Lynsdale	Referee: Mohammed Hassoun (Iraq)

6 May 1951 Friendly	Turkey B	7–0	Iraq	İzmir, Turkey
17:30 UTC+3	Dinsel 3', 14'; Yamanoğlu 24', 66'; Gençay 35', 59'; Özirs 63'			Stadium: Alsancak Mustafa Denizli Stadium; Attendance: 5,000; Referee: Constantin Tzitzis (Greece)

May 1951 Friendly	İzmir Demirspor	4–0	Iraq	İzmir, Turkey
				Stadium: Alsancak Mustafa Denizli Stadium

12 May 1951 Friendly	Ankara XI	7–5	Iraq	Ankara, Turkey
17:30 UTC+3	Uktel 2', 14', 54'; Gür 10' (pen.); Bilal 17', 51', 63'		Karam 3', 7', 12', 89'; Faraj 83'	Stadium: Ankara 19 Mayıs Stadium; Attendance: 1,500; Referee: Constantin Tzitzis (Greece)

=== 1960–1969 ===
1963

29 December 1963 Friendly	Iraq	2–1	Al-Sikak Al-Hadeed	Baghdad, Iraq

1965

9 February 1965 Friendly	Iraq	1–1	Iraq Whites	Baghdad, Iraq

4 August 1965 Friendly	Tersana	4–3	Iraq	Cairo, United Arab Republic
			Mahmoud; Atta; Ismail

6 August 1965 Friendly	Zamalek	0–3	Iraq	Cairo, United Arab Republic
			Hameed; Atta; Mahmoud

21 August 1965 Friendly	Iraq Reds	1–2	Iraq Greens	Baghdad, Iraq
	Balah	Report	Najim; Aziz	Stadium: Al-Kashafa Stadium

1966

7 March 1966 Friendly	Iraq A	1–2	Iraq B	Baghdad, Iraq
		Report	Jaber; Jameel	Stadium: Al-Kashafa Stadium

28 March 1966 Friendly	Iraq A	4–0	Iraq B	Baghdad, Iraq

1967

7 March 1967 1967 Tripoli Fair Tournament	Libya B	1–4	Iraq	Tripoli, Libya
			Khoshaba; Dhiab; Al-Sayed; Aziz	Stadium: June 11 Stadium

21 October 1967 Friendly	Lokomotiv Vinnytsia	2–1	Iraq	Vinnytsia, Soviet Union
			Nouri

24 October 1967 Friendly	Moldova Kishinev	1–0	Iraq	Chișinău, Soviet Union

28 October 1967 Friendly	Soviet Union B U23	7–1	Iraq	Moscow, Soviet Union
			Aziz

27 December 1967 Friendly	Iraq	0–0	Al-Qahira	Baghdad, Iraq

30 December 1967 Friendly	Iraq	3–0	Al-Qahira	Baghdad, Iraq

1968

2 January 1968 Friendly	Iraq	3–1	Basra XI	Baghdad, Iraq

4 January 1968 Friendly	Iraq	2–1	Basra XI	Baghdad, Iraq

1969

5 March 1969 1969 Friendship Cup	Spartak Moscow	2–0	Iraq	Tehran, Iran
	Khusainov 51'; Lovchev 61'			Stadium: Amjadieh Stadium; Attendance: 15,000; Referee: Abolghasem Haj Abolhasan (Iran)

13 March 1969 1969 Friendship Cup	Mersin İdman Yurdu	1–0	Iraq	Tehran, Iran
	Açıkgöz			Stadium: Amjadieh Stadium; Attendance: 5,000; Referee: Davood Nasiri (Iran)

18 December 1969 Friendly	Iraq	1–1	Poland U23	Baghdad, Iraq
	Aziz			Stadium: Al-Shaab Stadium

=== 1970–1979 ===
1970

9 July 1970 Friendly	FK Sarajevo	4–2	Iraq	Sarajevo, Yugoslavia
			Aziz; Dhiab

11 July 1970 Friendly	FK Konjic	1–2	Iraq	Konjic, Yugoslavia
			Aziz; Kadhim

18 July 1970 Friendly	Poland U23	3–0	Iraq	Lublin, Poland

28 July 1970 Friendly	Dynamo Dresden	4–2	Iraq	Dresden, East Germany
			Nouri; Hadi

31 July 1970 Friendly	FK Elektronika	1–0	Iraq	Gorky, Soviet Union

24 October 1970 Friendly	Split XI	4–2	Iraq	Split, Soviet Union
			Dhiab; Ahmed

27 October 1970 Friendly	FK Sarajevo	4–2	Iraq	Sarajevo, Yugoslavia
			Yousif; Kadhim

1971

12 June 1971 Friendly	Basra XI	2–2	Iraq	Basra, Iraq

14 June 1971 Friendly	Iraq	1–0	Maslahat Naqil Al-Rukab	Baghdad, Iraq

3 July 1971 Friendly	Iraq	1–0	Maslahat Naqil Al-Rukab	Baghdad, Iraq

9 July 1971 Friendly	Iraq	2–5	Basra XI	Baghdad, Iraq
	Aziz 11' (pen.); Hormuz 39'		Hanoon 36'; Ahmed 55'; Hadi 58'; Dawood	Stadium: Al-Shaab Stadium

11 July 1971 Friendly	Iraq	5–0	Basra XI	Baghdad, Iraq
	Obeid; Aziz; Dhiab (pen.); Hassan			Stadium: Al-Shaab Stadium

3 August 1971 Friendly	Al-Firqa Al-Thalitha	1–2	Iraq	Habbaniyah, Iraq

12 August 1971 Friendly	Iraq	2–0	Kahrabaa Al-Wusta	Baghdad, Iraq

15 August 1971 Friendly	Iraq	3–0	Kahrabaa Al-Wusta	Baghdad, Iraq

17 August 1971 Friendly	Iraq	2–0	Al-Muwasalat XI	Baghdad, Iraq

25 August 1971 Friendly	Iraq	0–0	Al-Quwa Al-Jawiya	Baghdad, Iraq

2 September 1971 Friendly	Iraq	3–0	Maslahat Naqil Al-Rukab	Baghdad, Iraq

23 October 1971 Friendly	Iraq	3–1	Maslahat Naqil Al-Rukab	Baghdad, Iraq

29 October 1971 Friendly	Iraq	2–0	Al-Muwasalat XI	Baghdad, Iraq

4 November 1971 Friendly	Iraq	1–0	Iraq Army	Baghdad, Iraq

1973

2 January 1973 Friendly	Iraq A	2–0	Iraq B	Baghdad, Iraq

8 January 1973 Friendly	Iraq	1–1	Kahrabaa Al-Wusta	Baghdad, Iraq

13 January 1973 Friendly	Iraq	0–1	Basra XI	Baghdad, Iraq

15 January 1973 Friendly	Iraq	3–0	Basra XI	Baghdad, Iraq

20 January 1973 Friendly	Iraq	3–1	Al-Sikak Al-Hadeed	Baghdad, Iraq

27 January 1973 Friendly	Iraq	2–1	Quwat Salahaddin	Baghdad, Iraq

1 February 1973 Friendly	Iraq	1–0	Al-Mushat	Baghdad, Iraq

3 February 1973 Friendly	Iraq A	2–0	Iraq B	Baghdad, Iraq

6 February 1973 Friendly	Iraq	3–1	Luskov Yambol	Baghdad, Iraq
	Yousif 17', 55'; Kadhim 31'			Stadium: Al-Shaab Stadium

10 February 1973 Friendly	Iraq	2–1	Maslahat Naqil Al-Rukab	Baghdad, Iraq

12 February 1973 Friendly	Iraq	2–1	Luskov Yambol	Baghdad, Iraq
	Hatim; Obeid			Stadium: Al-Shaab Stadium

22 February 1973 Friendly	Iraq	3–1	Maslahat Naqil Al-Rukab	Baghdad, Iraq

4 March 1973 Friendly	Iraq	4–1	Aliyat Al-Shorta	Baghdad, Iraq

2 August 1973 Friendly	Iraq	2–2	Muthanna XI	Baghdad, Iraq

4 August 1973 Friendly	Iraq	1–0	Iraq School	Baghdad, Iraq

1974

8 February 1974 Friendly	Iraq	0–0	Iraq U19	Baghdad, Iraq

4 May 1974 Friendly	Mukalla XI	3–10	Iraq	Hadhramaut, South Yemen
			Jassam; Hassan; Mahdi; Hamparsum

24 May 1974 Friendly	Iraq	2–2	Basra XI	Baghdad, Iraq
	Kadhim 55', 60'		Ahmed

26 May 1974 Friendly	Iraq	1–3	Basra XI	Baghdad, Iraq
	Kadhim (pen.)		Hanoon; Hadi

9 June 1974 Friendly	Benghazi XI	1–1	Iraq	Benghazi, Libya
			Nouri

7 July 1974 Friendly	Iraq	2–1	Al-Sikak Al-Hadeed	Baghdad, Iraq

14 July 1974 1974 July Championship	Iraq	2–2	Budapest Honvéd	Baghdad, Iraq
	Hanoon			Stadium: Al-Shaab Stadium

16 July 1974 1974 July Championship	Iraq	3–0	Iraq Army U19	Baghdad, Iraq

25 December 1974 Friendly	Iraq	4–2	Iraq U19	Baghdad, Iraq

1975

12 July 1975 Friendly	Iraq A	2–2	Iraq B	Baghdad, Iraq

17 July 1975 Friendly	Iraq	1–0	Iraq U19	Baghdad, Iraq

27 July 1975 Friendly	Iraq	2–1	Basra XI	Baghdad, Iraq

31 July 1975 Friendly	Iraq	3–0	Basra XI	Baghdad, Iraq

14 August 1975 Friendly	Iraq	1–0	Al-Jaish	Baghdad, Iraq

15 November 1975 Friendly	Iraq	1–0	Al-Iktisad	Baghdad, Iraq

1976

20 August 1976 Friendly	Nineveh XI	0–5	Iraq	Mosul, Iraq

24 August 1976 Friendly	Nineveh Youth XI	0–0	Iraq	Mosul, Iraq

4 December 1976 Friendly	Iraq	1–0	Yugoslavia Olympic	Baghdad, Iraq
	Waal			Stadium: Al-Shaab Stadium

1977

26 November 1977 Friendly	Iraq	1–1	Iraq U19	Baghdad, Iraq

1979

23 February 1979 Friendly	Iraq	1–0	Sweden B	Baghdad, Iraq
	Saeed			Stadium: Al-Shaab Stadium

=== 1980–1989 ===
1980

15 February 1980 Friendly	Iraq	1–0	Politehnica Timișoara	Baghdad, Iraq
	Ahmed			Stadium: Al-Shaab Stadium

17 February 1980 Friendly	Iraq	1–2	Politehnica Timișoara	Baghdad, Iraq
	Saeed 11'			Stadium: Al-Shaab Stadium

22 February 1980 Friendly	Iraq	2–1	Boldklubben 1903	Baghdad, Iraq
	Saeed; Aziz			Stadium: Al-Shaab Stadium

24 February 1980 Friendly	Iraq	3–2	Boldklubben 1903	Baghdad, Iraq
	Saeed; Ashraf			Stadium: Al-Shaab Stadium

7 June 1980 Friendly	Iraq	2–0	Al-Amana	Baghdad, Iraq

14 June 1980 Friendly	Iraq	3–0	Iraq U19	Baghdad, Iraq

20 June 1980 Friendly	Poland FA XI	4–1	Iraq	Konin, Poland
			Ashraf 35'

June 1980 Friendly	FC Brașov	2–0	Iraq	Brașov, Romania

1981

30 January 1981 Friendly	Iraq	2–1	Al-Sinaa	Baghdad, Iraq

25 July 1981 Friendly	Gyöngyösi SE	1–0	Iraq	Gyöngyös, Hungary

26 July 1981 Friendly	Honvéd Bem SE	2–1	Iraq	Gyöngyös, Hungary

22 August 1981 Friendly	Iraq	4–0	AS Kaloum Star	Baghdad, Iraq
	Shihab; Hadi; Hassan; Shaker			Stadium: Al-Shaab Stadium

24 August 1981 Friendly	Iraq	2–2	AS Kaloum Star	Baghdad, Iraq
	Aziz; Khudhair			Stadium: Al-Shaab Stadium

3 September 1981 1981 Merdeka Tournament	São Paulo XI	2–1	Iraq	Kuala Lumpur, Malaysia
			Abdul-Sahib	Stadium: Merdeka Stadium

20 September 1981 1981 Merdeka Tournament	São Paulo XI	0–1	Iraq	Kuala Lumpur, Malaysia
			Hassan	Stadium: Merdeka Stadium

1982

6 January 1982 Friendly	Iraq	0–0	OFK Beograd	Baghdad, Iraq
				Stadium: Al-Shaab Stadium

9 January 1982 Friendly	Iraq	1–0	OFK Beograd	Baghdad, Iraq
	Hassan 41'			Stadium: Al-Shaab Stadium

8 February 1982 Friendly	Iraq	2–1	PFC CSKA Sofia	Baghdad, Iraq
	Hassan 27'; Shihab 31'			Stadium: Al-Shaab Stadium

11 February 1982 Friendly	Iraq	2–2	PFC CSKA Sofia	Baghdad, Iraq
	Saeed 47'; Farhan 59'			Stadium: Al-Shaab Stadium

3 November 1982 Friendly	Iraq	4–1	Sportul Studențesc	Baghdad, Iraq
	Hashim; Saeed; Mohammed; Shihab			Stadium: Al-Shaab Stadium

11 November 1982 Friendly	Al-Yarmouk	0–8	Iraq	Kuwait City, Kuwait
			Mohammed; Hashim; Jassim; Saeed; Ali; Dirjal

1983

August 1983 Friendly	Iraq	2–0	Al-Talaba	Baghdad, Iraq

August 1983 Friendly	Iraq	6–0	Al-Shorta	Baghdad, Iraq

25 August 1983 Friendly	Iraq	3–0	Al-Talaba	Baghdad, Iraq

1984

30 January 1984 Friendly	Iraq	1–1	Vasas SC	Baghdad, Iraq
	Allawi			Stadium: Al-Shaab Stadium

1 February 1984 Friendly	Iraq	1–1	Vasas SC	Baghdad, Iraq
	Saeed 74' (pen.)			Stadium: Al-Shaab Stadium

4 February 1984 Friendly	Iraq	1–1	East German League XI	Baghdad, Iraq
	Saeed 80'			Stadium: Al-Shaab Stadium

6 February 1984 Friendly	Iraq	1–1	East German League XI	Baghdad, Iraq
	Radhi 84'			Stadium: Al-Shaab Stadium

16 February 1984 Friendly	Iraq	2–1	FC Shumen 1929	Baghdad, Iraq
	Radhi; Abdul-Hassan			Stadium: Al-Shaab Stadium

18 February 1984 Friendly	Iraq	1–0	FC Shumen 1929	Baghdad, Iraq
	Jassim			Stadium: Al-Shaab Stadium

12 July 1984 Friendly	Iraq	3–1	Vorwärts Frankfurt	Baghdad, Iraq
	Saeed; Allawi; Saddam			Stadium: Al-Shaab Stadium

16 July 1984 Friendly	Iraq	3–1	Vorwärts Frankfurt	Baghdad, Iraq
	Jassim; Dirjal; Saddam			Stadium: Al-Shaab Stadium

15 October 1984 1984 Merlion Cup	Iraq	2–0	Argentina U20	Kallang, Singapore
	Radhi 60'; Saeed 87'			Stadium: Singapore National Stadium

18 October 1984 1984 Merlion Cup	Iraq	3–0	South Korea U23	Kallang, Singapore
	Saeed 4'; Hashim 43'; Shihab 88'			Stadium: Singapore National Stadium

22 October 1984 1984 Merlion Cup	Iraq	2–1	Chile U20	Kallang, Singapore
	Saddam 60', 75'		Marchant 31' (pen.)	Stadium: Singapore National Stadium

26 October 1984 1984 Merlion Cup	Iraq	1–1 (a.e.t.) (9–8 p)	Australia U20	Kallang, Singapore
	Saeed 116'		Farina 109'	Stadium: Singapore National Stadium
	Penalties
	Ali (penalty scored); Saeed (penalty scored); Karim Allawi (penalty scored); Radhi (penalty missed); Hashim (penalty scored); Khalil Allawi (penalty scored); Shihab (penalty scored); Gorgis (penalty scored); Dirjal (penalty scored); Nsaief (penalty scored)		(penalty scored) Bernal; (penalty scored) Farina; (penalty scored) Panagis; (penalty scored) Maier; (penalty missed) Tredinnick; (penalty scored) Gregson; (penalty scored) Vlietstra; (penalty scored) Hooker; (penalty scored) Spink; (penalty missed) Mihailidis

28 October 1984 1984 Merlion Cup	Iraq	2–1 (a.e.t.)	South Korea U23	Kallang, Singapore
	Saeed 43'; Munir 108'		Kim Jong-boo 12'	Stadium: Singapore National Stadium

1985

6 January 1985 Friendly	Iraq	3–1	Netherlands Olympic	Baghdad, Iraq
	Hashim 14'; Allawi 36'; Saeed 81'			Stadium: Al-Shaab Stadium

8 January 1985 Friendly	Iraq	2–0	Netherlands Olympic	Baghdad, Iraq
	Shihab; Saeed			Stadium: Al-Shaab Stadium

11 February 1985 Friendly	Iraq	2–0	Nottingham Forest	Baghdad, Iraq
	Ali 12'; Hashim 62'			Stadium: Al-Shaab Stadium

13 February 1985 Friendly	Iraq	1–1	Nottingham Forest	Baghdad, Iraq
	Saddam 90'			Stadium: Al-Shaab Stadium

2 March 1985 Friendly	Iraq	2–2	South Korea Olympic	Baghdad, Iraq
	Ali; Hashim			Stadium: Al-Shaab Stadium

8 March 1985 Friendly	Iraq	1–1	Rangers	Baghdad, Iraq
	Shihab 58'		Ferguson 75'	Stadium: Al-Shaab Stadium

10 March 1985 Friendly	Iraq	4–1	Rangers	Baghdad, Iraq
	Radhi 7'; Shihab 22'; Saeed 46'; Allawi 89'		Prytz 65'	Stadium: Al-Shaab Stadium

3 June 1985 1985 President's Cup	Lierse	3–5	Iraq	Seoul, South Korea
19:20 KST	Roberto 4'; Dirk 35', 46'		Saddam 6', 68'; Allawi 31'; Shaker 38'; Hashim 79'	Stadium: Dongdaemun Stadium

5 June 1985 1985 President's Cup	Bangu	2–2	Iraq	Daejeon, South Korea
15:30 KST	Gênio 12'; Mário 15'		Allawi 42'; Munir 62'	Stadium: Daejeon Hanbat Sports Complex

11 June 1985 1985 President's Cup	Huracán	2–5	Iraq	Daegu, South Korea
17:30 KST	Claudio 55'; Janin 61'		Radhi; Munir; Gorgis; Saddam 85'	Stadium: Daegu Civic Stadium

13 June 1985 1985 President's Cup	South Korea Olympic	1–0	Iraq	Seoul, South Korea
19:20 KST	Pan-keun 77'			Stadium: Dongdaemun Stadium

17 June 1985 1985 President's Cup	Iraq	1–1 (4–5 p)	Bangu	Seoul, South Korea
17:00 KST	Goal		(o.g.)	Stadium: Dongdaemun Stadium

23 July 1985 Friendly	Iraq	2–1	Al-Tayaran	Baghdad, Iraq

27 July 1985 Friendly	Iraq A	2–1	Iraq C	Baghdad, Iraq

31 July 1985 Friendly	Iraq A	2–1	Iraq C	Baghdad, Iraq

7 October 1985 Friendly	Iraq A	2–1	Iraq B	Baghdad, Iraq

10 October 1985 Friendly	Iraq A	6–0	Iraq B	Baghdad, Iraq

25 October 1985 Friendly	Iraq	3–0	Al-Qadsia	Baghdad, Iraq
	Saeed; Shihab			Stadium: Al-Shaab Stadium

1986

5 February 1986 Friendly	Iraq	0–2	CR Flamengo	Baghdad, Iraq
				Stadium: Al-Shaab Stadium

12 February 1986 Friendly	Iraq B	3–1	Dukla Prague	Baghdad, Iraq
	Hussein; Jafar			Stadium: Al-Shaab Stadium

14 February 1986 Friendly	Iraq B	0–1	Dukla Prague	Baghdad, Iraq
				Stadium: Al-Shaab Stadium

2 March 1986 Friendly	Iraq B	0–1	Ipswich Town	Baghdad, Iraq
		Report	Putney 60'	Stadium: Al-Shaab Stadium; Attendance: 3,000

4 March 1986 Friendly	Iraq B	0–0	Ipswich Town	Baghdad, Iraq
		Report		Stadium: Al-Shaab Stadium; Attendance: 4,000

5 March 1986 Friendly	Iraq	1–1	Chelsea	Baghdad, Iraq
	Allawi		McLaughlin	Stadium: Al-Shaab Stadium

3 April 1986 Friendly	America-RJ	2–2	Iraq	Rio de Janeiro, Brazil
			Allawi; Gorgis

9 April 1986 Friendly	CR Flamengo	3–1	Iraq	Rio de Janeiro, Brazil
			Radhi 34'

13 April 1986 Friendly	Carioca	0–2	Iraq	Rio de Janeiro, Brazil
			Abid; Shaker 80' (pen.)

16 April 1986 Friendly	Bangu	1–2	Iraq	Rio de Janeiro, Brazil
			Haris Mohammed 7'; Radhi 77'

20 April 1986 Friendly	Teresópolis	0–8	Iraq	Rio de Janeiro, Brazil
			Abid; Radhi; Shaker; Hameed

28 April 1986 Friendly	Iraq	1–0	League of Ireland XI	Baghdad, Iraq
	Radhi			Stadium: Al-Shaab Stadium; Attendance: 25,000

2 May 1986 Friendly	Iraq	2–0	FC Schalke 04	Baghdad, Iraq
	Hashim 29'; Shaker 65' (pen.)			Stadium: Al-Shaab Stadium

16 May 1986 Friendly	Mexico U19	0–1	Iraq	Mexico City, Mexico
			Saeed

19 May 1986 Friendly	Toluca FC	0–2	Iraq	Toluca, Mexico
			Saeed

21 May 1986 Friendly	Pumas UNAM	0–2	Iraq	Mexico City, Mexico
			Allawi 16'; Saeed 34'

23 May 1986 Friendly	Toluca FC U19	1–2	Iraq	Toluca, Mexico
			Hameed; Radhi

25 May 1986 Friendly	Club América	1–3	Iraq	Mexico City, Mexico
			Mohammed; Radhi; Saeed

6 September 1986 Friendly	Vitória F.C.	2–2	Iraq	Setúbal, Portugal

10 September 1986 Friendly	Belenenses	2–1	Iraq	Lisbon, Portugal

1987

15 February 1987 Friendly	Al-Rayyan	0–1	Iraq	Doha, Qatar
			Gorgis

17 February 1987 Friendly	Iraq	3–2	Leicester City	Doha, Qatar
	Rahim 7', 40'; Radhi 87'

19 February 1987 Friendly	Iraq	1–3	Al-Hilal	Doha, Qatar

2 March 1987 Friendly	Al-Ahly	0–0	Iraq	Cairo, Egypt

18 March 1987 Friendly	Iraq	1–1	FK Partizan	Baghdad, Iraq
	Radhi			Stadium: Al-Shaab Stadium

20 March 1987 Friendly	Iraq	0–2	FK Partizan	Baghdad, Iraq
				Stadium: Al-Shaab Stadium

3 October 1987 Friendly	F.C. Barreirense	1–3	Iraq	Barreiro, Portugal
			Jafar; Oraibi; Shihab

6 October 1987 Friendly	Clube Oriental de Lisboa	0–0	Iraq	Lisbon, Portugal

10 October 1987 Friendly	Sporting CP	1–4	Iraq	Lisbon, Portugal
			Oraibi; Radhi; Qais; Jafar

14 October 1987 Friendly	Belenenses	0–0	Iraq	Lisbon, Portugal

12 November 1987 Friendly	Iraq	3–0	Herfølge Boldklub	Kuwait City, Kuwait
	Saeed; Hashim

25 November 1987 Friendly	Iraq	1–3	Botafogo FR	Kuwait City, Kuwait
	Jafar

15 December 1987 Friendly	Al-Qadsia	4–3	Iraq	Kuwait City, Kuwait
			Daham 22'; Hussein 26'; Saddam 30'

1988

17 February 1988 Friendly	Egypt XI	0–2	Iraq	Cairo, Egypt
			Radhi; Shihab

19 February 1988 Friendly	Al-Mokawloon Al-Arab	0–2	Iraq	Cairo, Egypt
			Qais; Allawi

22 February 1988 Friendly	Ghazl El Mahalla	1–1	Iraq	Cairo, Egypt
			Jassim

26 May 1988 Friendly	FK Zemun	2–2	Iraq	Belgrade, Yugoslavia
			Saeed

31 May 1988 Friendly	FK Radnički Niš	3–5	Iraq	Belgrade, Yugoslavia

9 June 1988 Friendly	Iraq A	1–4	Iraq B	Baghdad, Iraq

18 June 1988 1988 President's Cup	South Korea B	0–2	Iraq	Cheongju, South Korea
17:50 KST			Saeed 33', 84'	Stadium: Cheongju Sports Complex

20 June 1988 1988 President's Cup	Iraq	3–1	Gimnasia y Esgrima (LP)	Anyang, South Korea
16:00 KST	Allawi 44'; Qais 65'; Radhi 70'		Carrió 73'	Stadium: Anyang Sports Complex

22 June 1988 1988 President's Cup	Iraq	2–1	Hungary U21	Gangneung, South Korea
16:00 KST	Oraibi 57'; Saeed 75'		Fischer 41'	Stadium: Gangneung Stadium

24 June 1988 1988 President's Cup	Iraq	1–2	Iwuanyanwu Nationale	Busan, South Korea
20:30 KST	Radhi 61'		Ekpo 24'; Uzokwe 43'	Stadium: Busan Gudeok Stadium

12 September 1988 Friendly	Daewoo Royals	0–0	Iraq	Seoul, South Korea

19 December 1988 Friendly	Iraq	6–2	Iraq Army	Baghdad, Iraq

=== 1990–1999 ===
1990

29 January 1990 Friendly	Iraq	1–1	Norway U21	Baghdad, Iraq
	Saeed 33'			Stadium: Al-Shaab Stadium

1 February 1990 Friendly	Iraq	1–0	Norway U21	Baghdad, Iraq
	Radhi 31'			Stadium: Al-Shaab Stadium

5 February 1990 Friendly	Iraq	1–2	Denmark U21	Baghdad, Iraq
	Hashim 27'			Stadium: Al-Shaab Stadium

8 February 1990 Friendly	Iraq	2–1	Denmark U21	Baghdad, Iraq
	Hussein 28'; Radhi 40'			Stadium: Al-Shaab Stadium

5 July 1990 Friendly	Hungary U21	1–2	Iraq	Fonyód, Hungary

7 July 1990 Friendly	Marcali VSE	1–2	Iraq	Marcali, Hungary

11 July 1990 Friendly	Fonyódi Petőfi SE	0–8	Iraq	Fonyód, Hungary

12 July 1990 Friendly	Siófok Bányász SK	1–1	Iraq	Siófok, Hungary

25 July 1990 Friendly	Iraq A	0–0	Iraq B	Baghdad, Iraq

29 August 1990 Friendly	Tianjin	0–0	Iraq	Tianjin, China

31 August 1990 Friendly	China U23	0–0	Iraq	Beijing, China

4 September 1990 Friendly	China U23	1–2	Iraq	Beijing, China
			Hussein; Omran

1992

22 August 1992 1992 Jordan International Tournament	Iraq	3–0	ES Setif	Irbid, Jordan
	Emmanuel 4', 70', 85'			Stadium: Al-Hassan Stadium

1993

22 March 1993 Friendly	FC Etar	0–1	Iraq	Veliko Tarnovo, Bulgaria

25 March 1993 Friendly	PFC Lokomotiv Plovdiv	1–1	Iraq	Plovdiv, Bulgaria

30 March 1993 Friendly	PFC Cherno More Varna	1–5	Iraq	Varna, Bulgaria

3 April 1993 Friendly	PFC CSKA Sofia	3–3	Iraq	Sofia, Bulgaria

5 May 1993 Friendly	FC Spartak-2 Moscow	0–1	Iraq	Moscow, Russia

6 May 1993 Friendly	FC Spartak Moscow	4–1	Iraq	Moscow, Russia

May 1993 Friendly	FC KAMAZ	1–1	Iraq	Chelny, Russia

May 1993 Friendly	Asmaral	1–3	Iraq	Moscow, Russia

15 August 1993 Friendly	Asmaral	1–4	Iraq	Moscow, Russia

17 August 1993 Friendly	FC Zhemchuzhina-Sochi	1–2	Iraq	Sochi, Russia

19 August 1993 Friendly	FC Rotor Volgograd	4–0	Iraq	Volgograd, Russia

22 August 1993 Friendly	Asmaral	1–2	Iraq	Moscow, Russia

9 September 1993 Friendly	Selena Bacău	0–1	Iraq	Bacău, Romania
			Qais

13 September 1993 Friendly	Acord Focșani	1–2	Iraq	Focșani, Romania
			Qais; Saddam

14 September 1993 Friendly	Bacău XI	1–3	Iraq	Bacău, Romania
			Abdul-Kadhim; Kadhim; Radhi

19 September 1993 Friendly	Selena Bacău	1–4	Iraq	Bacău, Romania
			Abdul-Kadhim; Kadhim

21 September 1993 Friendly	FC Progresul București	1–2	Iraq	Bucharest, Romania
			Hussein; Daham

23 September 1993 Friendly	CSM Jiul Petroșani	1–1	Iraq	Petroșani, Romania
			Qais

28 September 1993 Friendly	Iraq	1–1	FC Progresul București	Baghdad, Iraq
	Qais			Stadium: Al-Shaab Stadium

1995

8 March 1995 1995 Nehru Cup	Iraq	3–1	Uzbekistan U20	Calcutta, India
	Fawzi; Saadoun; Mushraf			Stadium: Salt Lake Stadium

10 March 1995 1995 Nehru Cup	FC Zenit Saint Petersburg	0–0	Iraq	Calcutta, India
				Stadium: Salt Lake Stadium

18 March 1995 1995 Nehru Cup	Iraq	1–0	FC Zenit Saint Petersburg	Calcutta, India
	Fawzi			Stadium: Salt Lake Stadium

19 July 1995 1995 Merdeka Tournament	South Korea U23	2–2	Iraq	Kuala Lumpur, Malaysia
	Woo-young 35', 50'		Obeid 61'; Saadoun 63'	Stadium: Merdeka Stadium; Attendance: 10,000

25 July 1995 1995 Merdeka Tournament	Iraq	1–0	Bulgaria XI	Kuala Lumpur, Malaysia
	Fawzi 69'			Stadium: Merdeka Stadium; Attendance: 12,000

2 August 1995 1995 Merdeka Tournament	Iraq	2–0	(Hungary) Vasas SC	Kuala Lumpur, Malaysia
	Mohammed 65'; Chathir 70'			Stadium: Merdeka Stadium; Attendance: 18,000

1996

27 July 1996 Friendly	PFC Septemvri Sofia	0–2	Iraq	Sofia, Bulgaria
			Saddam; Fawzi

31 July 1996 Friendly	PFC Slavia Sofia	1–0	Iraq	Sofia, Bulgaria

2 August 1996 Friendly	Bulgaria B	0–2	Iraq	Sofia, Bulgaria
			Daham; Abbas

3 October 1996 Friendly	AS Danubiana Ploiești	0–2	Iraq	Ploiești, Romania

5 October 1996 Friendly	FC Petrolul Ploiești	0–1	Iraq	Ploiești, Romania

7 October 1996 Friendly	CSM Flacăra Moreni	1–3	Iraq	Moreni, Romania

November 1996 Friendly	Al-Wakrah	3–0	Iraq	Doha, Qatar

27 November 1996 Friendly	Sampdoria Primavera	0–1	Iraq	Celle Ligure, Italy
			Hussein

1997

2 April 1997 1997 Nehru Cup	Iraq	6–1	Uzbekistan U19	Cochin, India
	Mahmoud 13'; Saadoun 36', 49'; Hussein 49'; Najim 83'; Jeayer 89'		Mataliev 70'	Stadium: Kaloor International Stadium

4 April 1997 1997 Nehru Cup	Iraq	1–0	Ghana XI	Cochin, India
	Saadoun 70'			Stadium: Kaloor International Stadium; Attendance: 7,000

12 April 1997 1997 Nehru Cup	Iraq	3–1	Uzbekistan U19	Cochin, India
	Fawzi 5'; Kuralev (o.g.); Hussein 60'		Mataliev	Stadium: Kaloor International Stadium

3 May 1997 Friendly	Iraq	2–1	FC Metalurh Zaporizhzhia	Baghdad, Iraq
	Hussein; Fawzi			Stadium: Al-Shaab Stadium

5 May 1997 Friendly	Iraq	1–0	FC Metalurh Zaporizhzhia	Baghdad, Iraq
	Fawzi			Stadium: Al-Shaab Stadium

12 May 1997 Friendly	Al-Sadd	0–3	Iraq	Doha, Qatar
			Jafar; Hussein; Radhi

1999

23 June 1999 Friendly	Iraq	1–1	Iraq U23	Baghdad, Iraq

=== 2000–2009 ===
2000

18 August 2000 Friendly	Iraq A	4–1	Iraq B	Baghdad, Iraq

28 August 2000 2000 Indonesian Independence Cup	Iraq B	3–0	Chinese Taipei	Jakarta, Indonesia
	Khudhair 4'; Mohammed 25', 58'

30 August 2000 2000 Indonesian Independence Cup	Myanmar	0–1	Iraq B	Jakarta, Indonesia
			Mohammed

1 September 2000 2000 Indonesian Independence Cup	Indonesia	0–0	Iraq B	Jakarta, Indonesia

3 September 2000 2000 Indonesian Independence Cup	Indonesia	3–0	Iraq B	Jakarta, Indonesia
	Santoso 55'; Sakti 58'; Doni 65'

20 September 2000 Friendly	Yugoslav club	0–7	Iraq	Belgrade, Yugoslavia

22 September 2000 Friendly	Yugoslav club	0–2	Iraq	Belgrade, Yugoslavia

24 September 2000 Friendly	Yugoslav club	0–3	Iraq	Belgrade, Yugoslavia

1 October 2000 Friendly	Yugoslav club	0–4	Iraq	Belgrade, Yugoslavia

3 October 2000 Friendly	OFK Beograd	0–0	Iraq	Belgrade, Yugoslavia

5 October 2000 Friendly	FK Rad	0–1	Iraq	Belgrade, Yugoslavia

7 October 2000 Friendly	Crvena zvezda	0–0	Iraq	Belgrade, Yugoslavia

2001

7 February 2001 Friendly	Tunisia U23	2–2	Iraq	Tunis, Tunisia
	Delhoum 47', 49'		Abbas 20'; Abdul-Hassan 65'	Referee: Muhsin Boukshir (Tunisia)

14 March 2001 Friendly	Iraq	3–2	Iraq U20	Baghdad, Iraq
	Rahim 3' (pen.); Mushraf 63'; Hassan 80'		Khudhair 85'; Ahmed 89'	Stadium: Al-Zawraa Stadium; Referee: Kadhim Awda (Iraq)

23 March 2001 Friendly	Iraq	3–0	Iraq U20	Baghdad, Iraq

29 March 2001 Friendly	Iraq A	2–0	Iraq B	Baghdad, Iraq

23 July 2001 Friendly	FK Spartak Subotica	2–3	Iraq	Subotica, Yugoslavia
	Milanec 15', 57' (pen.)		Abu Al-Hail 30', 37'; Hussein 62'	Referee: Zoran (Yugoslavia)

25 July 2001 Friendly	FK Veternik	2–1	Iraq	Novi Sad, Yugoslavia
	Miroslav; Babic 73'		Hussein 69'

28 August 2001 Friendly	Al-Ahli	0–3	Iraq	Manama, Bahrain

2002

24 March 2002 Friendly	Cagliari Calcio (Italy)	4–1	Iraq	Nuoro, Italy
15:30 UTC	De Angelis 46'; Esposito 58'; Suazo 63', 72'		Mahmoud 62'	Stadium: Stadio Quadrivio; Referee: Putzolu di Gonnosfanadiga (Italy)

27 March 2002 Friendly	Nuorese Calcio (Italy)	1–4	Iraq	Nuoro, Italy
19:00 UTC	Lai 83'		Mohammed 67', 69', 90'; Jabbar 86'	Stadium: Stadio Quadrivio

3 April 2002 Friendly	Bologna FC (Italy)	5–1	Iraq	Bologna, Italy
15:00 UTC	Cruz 21', 26'; Signori 41'; Bellucci 66'		Mohammed 64'	Stadium: Stadio Renato Dall'Ara; Referee: Dondarini di Finale Emilia (Italy)

10 April 2002 Friendly	Inter Milan Primavera (Italy)	0–2	Iraq	Milan, Italy
			Mohammed 82'; Khudhair 84'	Stadium: Centro Sportivo Angelo Moratti

25 June 2002 Friendly	Iraq	4–1	Iraq U19	Baghdad, Iraq
	Talla; Mahmoud (pen.); Mohammed		Kadhim	Stadium: Al-Shaab Stadium

7 August 2002 Friendly	Sorrento Calcio (Italy)	1–5	Iraq	Sorrento, Italy
	Castellano 14' (pen.)		Turki 17'; Mahmoud 40'; Farhan 60', 90'; Rahim 85'	Stadium: Stadio Serina

8 August 2002 Friendly	Benevento Calcio (Italy)	1–1	Iraq	Benevento, Italy
	Aruta 72' (pen.)		Abu Al-Hail 82' (pen.)	Stadium: Stadio Santa Colomba

10 August 2002 Friendly	USD Palmese (Italy)	1–1 (abd.)	Iraq	Palma Campania, Italy
	Varriale 10'		Wahaib 11'	Stadium: Comunale di Palma Campania
Note: The match was abandoned after 55 minutes due to floodlight failure.

11 August 2002 (45-minute match) Triangolare del San Francesco	US Avellino (Italy)	0–0 (4–5 p)	Iraq	Nocera Inferiore, Italy
				Stadium: Stadio San Francesco d'Assisi; Referee: Domenico Celi (Italy)
	Penalties
	Morfù (penalty scored); Vianello (penalty missed); Dié (penalty scored); Pellicori (penalty scored); Silvestri (penalty scored)		(penalty scored) Abdul-Jabar; (penalty scored) Kadhim; (penalty scored) Mahmoud; (penalty scored) Ghulam; (penalty scored) Mezher

11 August 2002 (45-minute match) Triangolare del San Francesco	US Nocerina (Italy)	2–1	Iraq	Nocera Inferiore, Italy
	Belmonte 3'; Bogni 8'		Rahim 35' (pen.)	Stadium: Stadio San Francesco d'Assisi

13 August 2002 Friendly	SS Ebolitana (Italy)	0–2	Iraq	Eboli, Italy
			Farhan 20', 28'	Stadium: Stadio Dirceu

27 August 2002 Friendly	Iraq	3–1	Al-Zawraa	Baghdad, Iraq

2003

15 July 2003 Friendly	Duhok XI (Iraq)	2–9	Iraq	Duhok, Iraq

18 July 2003 Friendly	Erbil XI (Iraq)	0–3	Iraq	Erbil, Iraq

6 August 2003 Friendly	Al-Karkh (Iraq)	0–1	Iraq	Baghdad, Iraq

29 August 2003 Friendly	Allgäu Auswahl (Germany)	0–4	Iraq	Oberstaufen, Germany
			Swadi; Abdul-Hussein; Al-Deen

1 September 2003 Friendly	Unterallgäu Auswahl (Germany)	0–3	Iraq	Mindelheim, Germany
			Hassan 44'; Mohammed 48'; Kadhim 84'

4 September 2003 Friendly	SpVgg Unterhaching (Germany)	1–4	Iraq	Unterhaching, Germany
	Okpala 43'		Swadi 4'; Fawzi 56'; Mohammed 65'; Hassan 80'

7 September 2003 Friendly	FC Energie Cottbus (Germany)	0–0	Iraq	Cottbus, Germany

9 September 2003 Friendly	Karlsruher SC (Germany)	3–1	Iraq	Karlsruhe, Germany
			Mohanad Mohammed Ali 72'

11 September 2003 Friendly	Mannheimer Stadtauswahl (Germany)	0–10	Iraq	Mannheim, Germany
			Fawzi; Hassan; Abdul-Hussein; Kadhim; Swadi; Talla; Kadhim; Ahmed

27 September 2003 Friendly	Al-Zawraa	1–1	Iraq	Baghdad, Iraq

16 November 2003 World Peace Game	Western Australia	0–1	Iraq	Perth, Australia
			Hassan 89'	Stadium: Arena Joondalup; Attendance: ~2,800; Referee: Eddie Lennie

22 November 2003 World Peace Game	Western Australia	0–4	Iraq	Albany, Australia
		Report	Swadi 17'; Ali 37'; Mnajed 68'; Talla 90'	Stadium: Collingwood Park; Attendance: ~1,500; Referee: Angelo Nardi

2004

20 May 2004 Friendly	UK Parliamentary FC (England)	0–11	Iraq	London, England
				Stadium: Burton's Court

27 May 2004 Friendly	England National Game XI	1–5	Iraq	Macclesfield, England
	Hatch	Report	Swadi 11'; Mnajed 53', 78'; Karim 67'; Fawzi 90'	Stadium: Moss Rose; Attendance: 2,683

8 July 2004 Friendly	Al-Faisaly (Jordan)	2–1	Iraq	Amman, Jordan

11 July 2004 Friendly	Thailand U20	4–4	Iraq	Bangkok, Thailand
			Hawar 8'; Mohammed 19'; Farhan 77'; Abu Al-Hail 80'

13 July 2004 Friendly	Thailand U23	1–1	Iraq	Bangkok, Thailand
			Farhan 60'

6 December 2004 Friendly	Al-Shaab (United Arab Emirates)	1–3	Iraq	Dubai, UAE
			Mnajed 16'; Mahmoud 24'; Mohammed 70'

2005

22 February 2005 Friendly	Al-Zawraa	3–0	Iraq	Baghdad, Iraq
	Jawad; Zaki			Stadium: Al-Zawraa Stadium

17 August 2005 Friendly	Apollon Limasol (Cyprus)	2–5	Iraq	Limassol, Cyprus
			Mahmoud 45', 53', 65', 68'; Karim 62'

2006

10 November 2006 Friendly	Gyeongnam (South Korea)	4–4	Iraq	Changwon, South Korea
			Karim 1'; Salah 49', 80'; Falah 67'

2007

11 January 2007 Friendly	FC Metalist Kharkiv (Ukraine)	2–2	Iraq	Sharjah, United Arab Emirates
			Jassim 15'; Salah 40'

13 January 2007 Friendly	Khazar Lankaran FK (Azerbaijan)	1–1	Iraq	Sharjah, United Arab Emirates
			Mahmoud 47'

22 December 2007 2007 King's Cup	Iraq B	1–0	North Korea	Bangkok, Thailand
19:15 UTC+7	Zaki 64'			Stadium: Rajamangala Stadium

24 December 2007 2007 King's Cup	Thailand	2–1	Iraq B	Bangkok, Thailand
18:45 UTC+7	Phanrit 43'; Abd Ali 83' (o.g.)		Mubarak 49'	Stadium: Rajamangala Stadium

26 December 2007 2007 King's Cup	Iraq B	3–1	Uzbekistan	Bangkok, Thailand
16:30 UTC+7	Salah 58'; Ibrahim 65'; Zaki 78'		Solomin 68' (pen.)	Stadium: Rajamangala Stadium

29 December 2007 2007 King's Cup	Thailand	1–0	Iraq B	Bangkok, Thailand
18:00 UTC+7	Vachiraban 67'			Stadium: Rajamangala Stadium

2008

22 December 2008 Goal for Peace	Ambasciatori di Pace (European Union)	2–1	Iraq	Milan, Italy
	Eranio 13', 26'		Hawar 39'	Stadium: San Siro; Referee: Massimiliano Saccani (Italy)

30 December 2008 Friendly	Al-Ahli (United Arab Emirates)	1–1	Iraq	Dubai, United Arab Emirates
			Mahmoud 58'

2009

16 March 2009 Friendly	Iraq	1–1	Iraq U19	Baghdad, Iraq
	Majeed		Jassim 49'	Stadium: Al-Shaab Stadium; Referee: Sabah Aboud (Iraq)

=== 2010–2019 ===
2011

15 June 2011 Friendly	Erbil	1–0	Iraq	Erbil, Iraq
	Shakor (pen.)			Stadium: Franso Hariri Stadium

25 June 2011 Friendly	Peshmerga Hawler	1–2	Iraq	Erbil, Iraq
18:00 UTC+3			Karim; Mahmoud	Stadium: Brayati Stadium

6 July 2011 Friendly	Çaykur Rizespor (Turkey)	0–3	Iraq	Esentepe, Turkey
			Abdul-Zahra 5'; Radhi 81', 88'

26 August 2011 Friendly	Iraq	2–2	Uganda U23	Erbil, Iraq
	Akram 37'; Mohammed 50'			Stadium: Franso Hariri Stadium

2012

26 February 2012 Friendly	Al-Shamal B (Qatar)	0–11	Iraq	Doha, Qatar
			A. Salah; Hawar; L. Salah; Karim; Abdul-Amir

6 September 2012 Friendly	Gimcheon Sangmu (South Korea)	0–3	Iraq	Cheonan, South Korea
			Radhi 31'; Ahmed 53'; Yasin 79'

6 October 2012 Friendly	Muaither (Qatar)	0–1	Iraq	Doha, Qatar
			Radhi 90'

2013

23 April 2013 Friendly	Iraq	9–2	Iraq U17	Baghdad, Iraq
	Tariq; M. Karim; Ahmed; Fadhel; Kalaf; Jawda		Resan; S. Karim	Stadium: Al-Shaab Stadium

30 April 2013 Friendly	Iraq	1–2	Iraq U20	Baghdad, Iraq
	Qabel		Abdelilah; Malik (pen.)	Stadium: Al-Shaab Stadium

26 September 2013 Friendly	Üsküdar Anadolu S.K. (Turkey)	0–0	Iraq	Istanbul, Turkey

2015

7 January 2015 Friendly	Wollongong Wolves (Australia)	0–3	Iraq	Wollongong, Australia
			Hussein 14', 31'; Abdul-Zahra 88'	Stadium: WIN Stadium

3 June 2015 Friendly	Zakho	0–2	Iraq	Zakho, Iraq
			Ali Wahid 37'; Mahmoud 58'	Stadium: Zakho International Stadium

18 August 2015 Friendly	Lekhwiya (Qatar)	3–1	Iraq	Doha, Qatar
			Mahmoud 60'

21 August 2015 Friendly	Qatar Companies Foreign XI	0–2	Iraq	Doha, Qatar
			Mahmoud; Abdul-Raheem

2016

20 July 2016 Friendly	Uzbekistan U23	2–1	Iraq	Tashkent, Uzbekistan
			Abdul-Zahra 50'

26 August 2016 Friendly	Perth Glory (Australia)	2–2	Iraq	Perth, Australia
			Husni 28'; Shokan 43'

10 November 2016 Friendly	Al-Ahli (Qatar)	0–4	Iraq	Doha, Qatar
			Ismail; Abdul-Zahra; Attwan; Shokan

2018

24 February 2018 Friendly	Naft Al-Junoob (Iraq)	1–1	Iraq	Basra, Iraq
	B. Ali		M. Ali	Stadium: Al-Fayhaa Stadium

25 February 2018 Friendly	Al-Minaa (Iraq)	0–0	Iraq	Basra, Iraq
				Stadium: Al-Fayhaa Stadium

=== 2020–present ===
2021

12 August 2021 Friendly	Atlético Baleares (Spain)	0–0	Iraq	Marbella, Spain
20:00 UTC+3				Stadium: Marbella Football Center

15 August 2021 Friendly	Linense (Spain)	0–0	Iraq	Marbella, Spain
11:30 UTC+3				Stadium: Marbella Football Center; Referee: Sanchez Villalobos (Spain)

21 August 2021 Friendly	Ağrı (Turkey)	0–6	Iraq	Kayseri, Turkey
17:00 UTC+3			Bayesh; (o.g.); Ismail; Jassim; Ali	Stadium: Erciyes High Altitude Camp Center

24 August 2021 Friendly	Kayserispor (Turkey)	1–1	Iraq	Kayseri, Turkey
11:00 UTC+3			Ali 88'

2022

19 September 2022 Friendly	Iraq	1–0	(Iraq) Al-Shorta	Baghdad, Iraq
16:30 UTC+3	Rostam			Stadium: Al-Madina Stadium

5 November 2022 Friendly	Iraq	2–0	(Iraq) Al-Kahrabaa	Baghdad, Iraq
	Jabbar; Hussein			Stadium: Al-Shaab Stadium

17 November 2022 Friendly	Iraq A	1–1	Iraq B	Basra, Iraq
17:00 UTC+3	Hussein 27'		Abdulkareem 18'	Stadium: Basra International Stadium

2023

20 June 2023 Friendly	Lincoln Red Imps (Gibraltar)	1–2	Iraq	Cádiz, Spain
19:00 UTC+2	Juampe 25'		Hussein 35', 50'
