= List of highest-scoring Iraq Stars League matches =

This is a summary of the highest scoring matches and biggest winning margins in the Iraq Stars League since its establishment in the 1974–75 season.

== Highest scoring games ==
Goals scored	Date	Home team	Result	Away team	Goal scorers	Ref
11	12 October 1974	Al-Naqil	11–0	Al-Shorta	Jassam 7', 57', Yousif 12', 55', 70', 75', 80', Luaibi 39', 54', Mohammed 49', Fadhel 84' –	
11	15 May 1995	Al-Ramadi	11–0	Kirkuk	Sabbar, Jaber, Ahmed, Jadiea –	
11	11 May 2023	Al-Quwa Al-Jawiya	9–2	Al-Diwaniya	Abdul-Raheem 19' (pen.), 43', Abdul-Kadhim 27', 38', Jabbar 37', 75', Mugalu 47', 60', Jumaa 83'; Adnan 52' (pen.), 85'	
10	18 April 1994	Al-Talaba	8–2	Al-Nasiriya	Daham, Kareem, Khalaf, Kadhim, Jeayer; Abdul-Nabi, Hassan (pen.)	
10	17 April 1998	Al-Talaba	9–1	Al-Kut	Chathir, Judi, Abu Al-Hail, Abdul-Samih, Kadhim; Saeed	
10	18 October 1999	Al-Najaf	8–2	Al-Samawa	Abbas, Wahoudi, Sahib, (o.g.); Ali, Abdul-Aal	
10	27 December 1999	Al-Quwa Al-Jawiya	9–1	Al-Mosul	Emmanuel 17', 45', 45+1', Khudhair (pen.), Dhahid 38', Abbas 43', Kadhim (pen.), Omran; Ahmed 33'	
10	5 March 2017	Al-Bahri	3–7	Al-Shorta	Athab 21', 45+3' (pen.), A. Hussein 77'; Salim 45+5' (pen.), 78', Zaidan 46', 60', M. Hussein 59', Tariq 66', Sadir 68' (o.g.)	
10	16 May 2017	Al-Zawraa	6–4	Al-Hussein	Abdul-Zahra 27', 56', 83', Abdul-Raheem 68', Hussein 78', Karim 85'; Haitham 8', Zeyad 58', Nino 89' (pen.), Raad 90'	
9	29 December 1983	Al-Amana	6–3	Al-Minaa	Mutanash, Allawi, Lazem, Hashim; Hato (pen.)	
9	12 January 1984	Al-Tayaran	6–3	Al-Minaa	Azhar, Jassim (pen.), Luaibi; Ahmad, Abdul-Zahra	
9	28 April 1987	Al-Tayaran	2–7	Al-Zawraa	Abdul-Sahib 28', Ali Thijeel 66'; Abdul-Wahid 11', Khalil 40', Saddam 49', 86', Mujbel 77' (o.g.), Abed Nadir 81', Hamad 90'	
9	11 October 1988	Al-Tayaran	7–2	Al-Tijara	Hashim, M. Jassim, Ibrahim, E. Jassim; Dinkha, J. Jassim	
9	27 October 1994	Al-Zawraa	9–0	Al-Jaish	Assem, Abbas, Abdul-Sattar, Fawzi –	
9	1 December 1994	Al-Sinaa	7–2	Kirkuk	Mohsin, Chathir, Abdullah; Qadir	
9	6 December 1994	Al-Ramadi	6–3	Kirkuk	Jaber, Khalaf, Shuker, Khalid, Ahmed; Yawar, Ghaib	
9	30 January 1995	Al-Jaish	8–1	Erbil	Mohammed, Adnan, Jawad, Jalis, Jubair, Hassan; Ameen	
9	9 February 1995	Erbil	2–7	Al-Karkh	Othman; Judi, Hashim, Mohsin, Abdul-Razzaq	
9	15 May 1995	Al-Quwa Al-Jawiya	4–5	Al-Minaa	Dhahid, Mohsin, Saadoun; Nasser, Mohsin (o.g.), Jassim, Mawla	
9	6 November 1998	Al-Quwa Al-Jawiya	9–0	Samarra	Farhan, Dhahid, Daham, Saddam, Swadi –	
9	29 January 1999	Samarra	3–6	Al-Talaba	Al-Marsoumi, Qasim; Abdul-Samih, Judi, Chathir, Jeayer, Abu Al-Hail (pen.), Saadoun	
9	6 February 1999	Al-Quwa Al-Jawiya	6–3	Al-Kadhimiya	Farhan, Daham, Khalaf, Kadhim, Ali; Mahmoud, Hadi (pen.), Khudhair	
9	23 April 1999	Al-Zawraa	9–0	Al-Jaish	Abdul-Latif, Abdul-Wahid, Hamad, Karim, Abdul-Sattar, Radhi, Mohammed –	
9	25 October 1999	Al-Karkh	9–0	Maysan	Chathir, Abdul-Hussein, Mnajed, Hussein, Dawood –	
9	18 February 2000	Al-Shorta	6–3	Al-Kadhimiya	Abbas 8', Ridha 21', 48', Assem 39', 83' (pen.), Ibrahim 78' (o.g.); Ali 29', 80', Jihad 87' (pen.)	
9	16 February 2001	Al-Samawa	9–0	Al-Ramadi	Mansour 2', 15', 27', 57', Abdul-Nabi 7', 13', 78', Abdul-Hakeem 8', Hassan 35' –	
9	11 March 2002	Al-Shorta	8–1	Al-Diwaniya	Mnajed 25', Mushraf 32', 75', 84', Habib 40', Ridha 81', 82', 87'; Salih 40'	
9	15 April 2005	Salahaddin	2–7	Al-Kahrabaa	Karim, Abboud	
9	8 December 2007	Al-Ramadi	2–7	Al-Quwa Al-Jawiya	O. Hameed 12', M. Hameed 55'; Abdul-Mohsen 23', 86', Khalid 29', 82', Ayad 35', Hashim 73', 90'	
9	15 December 2007	Al-Jaish	1–8	Al-Kahrabaa	Kadhim 61' (pen.); Shaker 30', 72', Abdul-Nabi 45', 51' (pen.), Sabah 53', 64', Wahaib 70', Rzaiej 89'	
9	17 July 2008	Al-Quwa Al-Jawiya	6–3	Kirkuk	Mansour 6', 46' (pen.), 78' (pen.), 90', Hanoon 48', Kadhim 90+4'; Shakor 14', 29', 59'	
9	27 June 2013	Erbil	8–1	Al-Minaa	Salah 3', 76', Mulla Mohammed 18', Bukenya 27', Radhi 43' (pen.), 85', Abdul-Amir 86', Khudhor 90'; Gnakpa 38'	

== Biggest winning margin ==
Goals margin	Date	Home team	Result	Away team	Goal scorers	Ref
11	12 October 1974	Al-Naqil	11–0	Al-Shorta	Jassam 7', 57', Yousif 12', 55', 70', 75', 80', Luaibi 39', 54', Mohammed 49', Fadhel 84' –	
11	15 May 1995	Al-Ramadi	11–0	Kirkuk	Sabbar, Jaber, Ahmed, Jadiea –	
9	27 October 1994	Al-Zawraa	9–0	Al-Jaish	Assem, Abbas, Abdul-Sattar, Fawzi –	
9	6 November 1998	Al-Quwa Al-Jawiya	9–0	Samarra	Farhan, Dhahid, Daham, Saddam, Swadi –	
9	23 April 1999	Al-Zawraa	9–0	Al-Jaish	Abdul-Latif, Abdul-Wahid, Hamad, Karim, Abdul-Sattar, Radhi, Mohammed –	
9	25 October 1999	Al-Karkh	9–0	Maysan	Chathir, Abdul-Hussein, Mnajed, Hussein, Dawood –	
9	16 February 2001	Al-Samawa	9–0	Al-Ramadi	Mansour 2', 15', 27', 57', Abdul-Nabi 7', 13', 78', Abdul-Hakeem 8', Hassan 35' –	
8	12 February 1986	Al-Zawraa	8–0	Al-Tijara	Jassim, Naji, Hassan, Abed Nadir, Abdul-Hussein –	
8	21 November 1991	Al-Zawraa	8–0	Al-Sulaikh	Saddam, Radhi, Hussein, Abed Nadir, Khalil –	
8	17 April 1998	Al-Talaba	9–1	Al-Kut	Chathir, Judi, Abu Al-Hail, Abdul-Samih, Kadhim; Saeed	
8	27 December 1999	Al-Quwa Al-Jawiya	9–1	Al-Mosul	Emmanuel 17', 45', 45+1', Khudhair (pen.), Dhahid 38', Abbas 43', Kadhim (pen.), Omran; Ahmed 33'	
8	5 January 2001	Al-Zawraa	8–0	Karbala	Ahmed 32', Fawzi, E. Mohammed 35', 71', H. Mohammed 75', Kadhim 85' –	
8	22 September 2001	Al-Talaba	8–0	Kirkuk	Kadhim 32', 35' (pen.), Mahmoud 40', 45', 50', Jeayer 70', 80', 85' –	
8	18 October 2002	Al-Shorta	8–0	Duhok	Akram 40', 42', 65', T. Abdul-Hussein 45', Mnajed 55', Abdul-Sattar 76', A. Abdul-Hussein 79' (pen.), Rahim 90' –	
7	1977	Al-Tayaran	7–0	Babil	Results from the second half of the 1976–77 Iraqi National League season were annulled.	
7	30 April 1993	Al-Talaba	7–0	Al-Minaa	Kareem, Zaidan, Jabbar, Hadi, Khalaf, Kadhim –	
7	13 May 1993	Al-Quwa Al-Jawiya	7–0	Sulaymaniya	Raouf, Dhahid, Sabbar –	
7	5 November 1993	Al-Zawraa	7–0	Salahaddin	Jassim, Abdul-Hameed, Mudhahar Khalaf, Munthir Khalaf, Hamad –	
7	23 December 1993	Al-Najaf	7–0	Kirkuk	Hashim, Jawad, Hassan, Mohammed –	
7	20 October 1994	Al-Umal	0–7	Al-Quwa Al-Jawiya	– Jassim, Wahaib, Zughair, Sabbar, Saadoun, Khalaf	
7	12 December 1994	Al-Zawraa	7–0	Al-Mosul	Assem, Abbas, Abdul-Hussein, Khalaf –	
7	30 January 1995	Al-Jaish	8–1	Erbil	Mohammed, Adnan, Jawad, Jalis, Jubair, Hassan; Ameen	
7	19 December 1997	Al-Talaba	7–0	Al-Minaa	Kadhim, Abu Al-Hail, Judi, Abdul-Samih, Chathir –	
7	1 October 1999	Al-Karkh	7–0	Al-Kut	Chathir, Abdul-Hussein –	
7	29 November 1999	Erbil	7–0	Kirkuk	Kadhim, Mahmoud, Omar, Waly (pen.), Fadhel –	
7	8 June 2000	Al-Karkh	7–0	Samarra	Chathir, Abdul-Hussein, Jumaa, Mezher –	
7	28 May 2001	Al-Karkh	7–0	Karbala	Khalaf 5', 35', 75', 82', Hassan 19', 21', Abdul-Hussein 55' –	
7	22 June 2001	Al-Shorta	7–0	Karbala	Rubui 17', Issa 21', Mushraf 24', 44', 80', Ogla 70', Abbas 75' –	
7	27 September 2001	Al-Shorta	7–0	Samarra	Ridha 14', 20', 29', 53', Ogla 67', Rahim 73', Issa 84' –	
7	16 November 2001	Al-Kadhimiya	0–7	Erbil	– Nasir 10', 56', Jafar 18', 60', Badraddin 67', Wahaib 78', 90'	
7	11 March 2002	Al-Shorta	8–1	Al-Diwaniya	Mnajed 25', Mushraf 32', 75', 84', Habib 40', Ridha 81', 82', 87'; Salih 40'	
7	17 January 2005	Al-Shuala	0–7	Al-Zawraa	– Abdul-Sada 3', 38', Mahmoud 23', Kadhim 32', Abdul-Zahra 57', Hassan 85', Nassir 88'	
7	15 December 2007	Al-Jaish	1–8	Al-Kahrabaa	Kadhim 61' (pen.); Shaker 30', 72', Abdul-Nabi 45', 51' (pen.), Sabah 53', 64', Wahaib 70', Rzaiej 89'	
7	18 December 2007	Al-Shuala	0–7	Al-Quwa Al-Jawiya	– Hashim 6', 44', 56', Ali Waheed 7', Abdul-Mohsen 25' (pen.), 60', 77'	
7	16 January 2010	Pires	7–0	Al-Hindiya	Karazan 10', Abdul-Karim 15', Shayyal 72', 88', Kalaf 74', Azad 80', Shukri 85' (pen.) –	
7	29 April 2013	Al-Zawraa	7–0	Kirkuk	Qasem 10', Waleed 45+1', Deeb 65', Mohammed 77' (pen.), 84', 88', Hussein 85' –	
7	27 June 2013	Erbil	8–1	Al-Minaa	Salah 3', 76', Mulla Mohammed 18', Bukenya 27', Radhi 43' (pen.), 85', Abdul-Amir 86', Khudhor 90'; Gnakpa 38'	
7	2 April 2021	Al-Shorta	7–0	Al-Samawa	Rivas 18', 35', Husni 26', Natiq 55', Silva 74', Abdul-Amir 79', Ghalib 90+1' –	
7	19 May 2022	Al-Diwaniya	7–0	Samarra	Rasheed 7', Malek 20', 49', Jumaa 47', Talib 67', 80', Al-Ameen 90+1' –	
7	11 May 2023	Al-Quwa Al-Jawiya	9–2	Al-Diwaniya	Abdul-Raheem 19' (pen.), 43', Abdul-Kadhim 27', 38', Jabbar 37', 75', Mugalu 47', 60', Jumaa 83'; Adnan 52' (pen.), 85'	
