= Iraq national football team results (1990–1999) =

This is a list of the Iraq national football team results from 1990 to 1999.

== Results ==
Win Draw Loss Fixtures

=== 1990s ===
1990

15 February 1990 Friendly	Iraq	0–0	South Korea	Baghdad, Iraq
				Stadium: Al-Shaab Stadium

26 February 1990 10th Arabian Gulf Cup	Bahrain	0–1	Iraq	Kuwait City, Kuwait
			Jafar 39'	Stadium: Jaber Al-Ahmad International Stadium

28 February 1990 10th Arabian Gulf Cup	Kuwait	1–1	Iraq	Kuwait City, Kuwait
			Hussein 59'	Stadium: Jaber Al-Ahmad International Stadium

3 March 1990 10th Arabian Gulf Cup	United Arab Emirates	2–2	Iraq	Kuwait City, Kuwait
			Radhi 25'; Qais 88'	Stadium: Jaber Al-Ahmad International Stadium

14 July 1990 Friendly	Iraq	4–1	China	Baghdad, Iraq
	Jafar; Qais; Radhi			Stadium: Al-Shaab Stadium

16 July 1990 Friendly	Iraq	0–0	China	Baghdad, Iraq
				Stadium: Al-Shaab Stadium

1992

18 August 1992 1992 Jordan Tournament	Iraq	13–0	Ethiopia	Irbid, Jordan
	Radhi 4', 32', 55', 77', 90'; Hussein 5', 6'; Jafar 16', 73'; Qais 36', 89'; Saddam 74'; Kadhim 79'	Report		Stadium: Al-Hassan Stadium

20 August 1992 1992 Jordan Tournament	Iraq	3–0	Congo	Irbid, Jordan
	Radhi 18', 57'; Saddam 35'	Report		Stadium: Al-Hassan Stadium

26 August 1992 1992 Jordan Tournament	Iraq	1–0	Moldova	Irbid, Jordan
	Jafar 20'	Report		Stadium: Al-Hassan Stadium

28 August 1992 1992 Jordan Tournament	Jordan	2–0	Iraq	Amman, Jordan
	Hussein 60'; Abdul-Munim 92'	Report		Stadium: Amman International Stadium

1993

25 April 1993 Friendly	South Korea	1–1	Iraq	Changwon, South Korea
			Radhi 50'

28 April 1993 Friendly	South Korea	2–2	Iraq	Ulsan, South Korea
			Abdul-Hameed 38'; Qais 76'

24 May 1993 1994 WCQ	Jordan	1–1	Iraq	Irbid, Jordan
	Tadrus 16'		Khalaf 75'	Stadium: Al-Hassan Stadium; Referee: Pirom Anprasert(Thailand)

26 May 1993 1994 WCQ	Yemen	1–6	Iraq	Irbid, Jordan
	Duraiban 16'		Hussein 1'; A.Kadhim 22', 76'; M.Kadhim 35'; Radhi 55'; Qais 73'	Stadium: Al-Hassan Stadium; Referee: Ammar Ammar (Lebanon)

28 May 1993 1994 WCQ	Pakistan	0–8	Iraq	Irbid, Jordan
			Hussein 12'; Qais 21', 70'; A.Kadhim 27', 75'; Radhi 44'; Khalaf 77'; Saddam 88'	Stadium: Al-Hassan Stadium; Referee: Mohamed Al-Mulla Abdalaziz(United Arab Emirates))

30 May 1993 1994 WCQ	Iraq	1–0	China	Irbid, Jordan
	Radhi 55'			Stadium: Al-Hassan Stadium; Referee: Pirom Anprasert(Thailand)

14 June 1993 1994 WCQ	Iraq	4–0	Jordan	Chengdu, China
	Hussein 3', 17'; A.Kadhim 25'; Radhi 52'			Stadium: Chengdu Sports Centre; Referee: Masayoshi Okada(Japan)

16 June 1993 1994 WCQ	Iraq	3–0	Yemen	Chengdu, China
	Radhi 46'; Qais 64'; Hussein 80'			Stadium: Chengdu Sports Centre; Referee: Santos Jose Manuel(Macau)

18 June 1993 1994 WCQ	Iraq	4–0	Pakistan	Chengdu, China
	Qais; Shenaishil; Daham			Stadium: Chengdu Sports Centre; Referee: Kim Jong Sik(North Korea)

20 June 1993 1994 WCQ	China	2–1	Iraq	Chengdu, China
	Xu Hong 63'; Zhao Faqing 89'		Emmanuel 47'	Stadium: Chengdu Sports Centre; Referee: Ali Mohamed Bujsaim(United Arab Emirates))

15 October 1993 1994 WCQ	North Korea	3–2	Iraq	Doha, Qatar
	Kim Gwang-Min 63'; Kim Gyong-Il 76'; Choi Won-Nam 80'		Kadhim 8', 46'	Stadium: Khalifa International Stadium; Attendance: 20,000; Referee: Uilenberg (Netherlands)

19 October 1993 1994 WCQ	Iraq	2–2	South Korea	Doha, Qatar
	Hussein 32'; Jafar 86'		Kim Pan-Keun 40'; Hong Myung-Bo 67' (pen.)	Stadium: Khalifa International Stadium; Attendance: 20,000; Referee: Quiniou (France)

22 October 1993 1994 WCQ	Iraq	2–1	Iran	Doha, Qatar
	Radhi 20'; Kadhim 38'		Daei 21'	Stadium: Khalifa International Stadium; Attendance: 30,000; Referee: Crăciunescu (Romania)

24 October 1993 1994 WCQ	Iraq	1–1	Saudi Arabia	Doha, Qatar
	Radhi 1'		Owairan 36'	Stadium: Khalifa International Stadium; Attendance: 20,000; Referee: Quiniou (France)

28 October 1993 1994 WCQ	Iraq	2–2	Japan	Doha, Qatar
	Radhi 54'; Omran 90'		Miura 5'; Nakayama 69'	Stadium: Al-Ahly Stadium; Attendance: 15,000; Referee: Muhmenthaler (Switzerland)

1995

12 March 1995 1995 Nehru Cup	India	1–1	Iraq	Calcutta, India
			Obeid 20'	Stadium: Salt Lake Stadium

14 March 1995 1995 Nehru Cup	Iraq	3–1	Thailand	Calcutta, India
	Hada 33'; Wahaib 51'; Alewi 78'			Stadium: Salt Lake Stadium

21 July 1995 1995 Merdeka Tournament	Malaysia	1–2	Iraq	Kuala Lumpur, Malaysia
			Obeid 11', 61'	Stadium: Merdeka Stadium

1996

11 August 1996 1996 ACQ	Pakistan	0–3	Iraq	Amman, Jordan
			Abbas 42'; Fawzi 65'; Shenaishel 67'	Stadium: King Abdullah Stadium

13 August 1996 1996 ACQ	Jordan	0–1	Iraq	Amman, Jordan
			Hashim 60'	Stadium: King Abdullah Stadium

23 November 1996 Friendly	Indonesia	0–4	Iraq	Genoa, Italy
			Chathir 16', 22'; Hussein 52'; Hashim 82'	Stadium: Stadio Luigi Ferraris

5 December 1996 1996 AFC Asian Cup	Iran	1–2	Iraq	Dubai, United Arab Emirates
19:00	Daei 90' (pen.)	Report	Fawzi 37'; Sabbar 69'	Stadium: Al-Maktoum Stadium; Attendance: 15,000; Referee: Masayoshi Okada (Japan)

8 December 1996 1996 AFC Asian Cup	Saudi Arabia	1–0	Iraq	Dubai, United Arab Emirates
16:45	Al-Mehallel 26'	Report		Stadium: Al-Maktoum Stadium; Attendance: 12,000; Referee: Ali Bujsaim (UAE)

11 December 1996 1996 AFC Asian Cup	Iraq	4–1	Thailand	Dubai, United Arab Emirates
19:00	Mahmoud 17', 50'; Hussein 23', 63'	Report	Chalermsan 26'	Stadium: Al-Maktoum Stadium; Attendance: 3,000; Referee: Kim Young-Joo (Korea Republic)

15 December 1996 1996 AFC Asian Cup	United Arab Emirates	1–0	Iraq	Abu Dhabi, United Arab Emirates
16:45	Ab. Ibrahim 103 min	Report		Stadium: Sheikh Zayed Stadium; Attendance: 50,000; Referee: Gamal Al-Ghandour (Egypt)

1997

16 February 1997 Friendly	Iraq	1–0	Jordan	Baghdad, Iraq
	Jafar 56'			Stadium: Al-Shaab Stadium

23 February 1997 Friendly	Iraq	1–0	Jordan	Baghdad, Iraq
	Fawzi			Stadium: Al-Shaab Stadium

30 March 1997 1997 Nehru Cup	Iraq	2–0	China	Cochin, India
	Mahmoud 30'; Kadhim 73'			Stadium: Kaloor International Stadium; Attendance: 10,000

6 April 1997 1997 Nehru Cup	Iraq	1–0	India	Cochin, India
	Chathir 24'			Stadium: Kaloor International Stadium

10 April 1997 1997 Nehru Cup	India	1–1 (a.e.t.) (2–4 p)	Iraq	Cochin, India
			Saadoun 74'	Stadium: Kaloor International Stadium

19 April 1997 Friendly	Iraq	5–1	Tajikistan	Baghdad, Iraq
	Mahmoud; Fawzi; Abbas; Saadoun			Stadium: Al-Shaab Stadium

23 May 1997 1998 WCQ	Pakistan	2–6	Iraq	Lahore, Pakistan
	Umer 8'; Rafiq 53'	(Report)	Fawzi 1', 62'; Chathir 35', 61'; Hussein 52'; Radhi 70'	Stadium: Railway Stadium; Attendance: 12,000; Referee: Sunil Senaweera (Sri Lanka)

6 June 1997 1998 WCQ	Iraq	1–2	Kazakhstan	Baghdad, Iraq
	Abdul-Ridha 2'	(Report)	Klishin 41'; Loginov 48'	Stadium: Al-Shaab Stadium; Attendance: 20,000; Referee: Wei Jihong (China)

20 June 1997 1998 WCQ	Iraq	6–1	Pakistan	Baghdad, Iraq
	Hussein 11', 26'; Fawzi 69', 76'; Abbas 71', 89'	(Report)	Umer 58'	Stadium: Al-Shaab Stadium; Referee: Ammar Ammar (Lebanon)

29 June 1997 1998 WCQ	Kazakhstan	3–1	Iraq	Almaty, Kazakhstan
	Mazbaev 4'; Loginov 36'; Abdul Ridha 56' (o.g.)	(Report)	Abdullah 56'	Stadium: Central Stadium; Attendance: 12,000; Referee: Jindamai Russamee (Thailand)

21 August 1997 Friendly	Lebanon	0–2	Iraq	Beirut, Lebanon
			Hussein

1998

18 November 1998 Friendly	Lebanon	0–2	Iraq	Beirut, Lebanon
			Farhan 55'; Jafar 68'	Stadium: National Stadium, Beirut

1999

28 June 1999 Friendly	Jordan	0–1	Iraq	Amman, Jordan
			Abdul-Latif 70'	Stadium: King Abdullah Stadium

30 June 1999 Friendly	Jordan	1–1	Iraq	Amman, Jordan
			Farhan	Stadium: King Abdullah Stadium

3 August 1999 2000 ACQ	Tajikistan	1–2	Iraq	Dushanbe, Tajikistan
	Muminov 32' (pen.)		Hamad 28' (pen.); Jafar 90'	Stadium: Central Stadium

5 August 1999 2000 ACQ	Iraq	2–0	Oman	Dushanbe, Tajikistan
	Farhan 55', 70'			Stadium: Central Stadium

7 August 1999 2000 ACQ	Iraq	5–1	Kyrgyzstan	Dushanbe, Tajikistan
	Farhan 54'; Fawzi 60'; Hamad 62'; Obeid 67', 80'		Zakirov 51'	Stadium: Central Stadium; Attendance: 5,000; Referee: Fereydoun Esfahanian (Iran)

19 August 1999 1999 Arab Games	Bahrain	0–2	Iraq	Amman, Jordan
			Fawzi 5'; Mahmoud 35'	Stadium: Amman International Stadium

21 August 1999 1999 Arab Games	Iraq	0–2	Libya	Amman, Jordan
			El Masli 41' 78'	Stadium: Amman International Stadium

23 August 1999 1999 Arab Games	Oman	0–3	Iraq	Irbid, Jordan
			Fawzi 4' 54' (pen.); Farhan 42'	Stadium: Al Hassan Stadium; Attendance: 5,000

25 August 1999 1999 Arab Games	Iraq	1–2	Jordan	Amman, Jordan
	Mohammed 87'		Hamarsheh 59'; Al-Shagran 90'	Stadium: Amman International Stadium; Attendance: 27,000

27 August 1999 1999 Arab Games	Iraq	4–0	Lebanon	Irbid, Jordan
	Mohammed 7' 54'; Rahim 59'; Al-Heil 88'			Stadium: Al Hassan Stadium; Attendance: 7,000

29 August 1999 1999 Arab Games	Iraq	3–1	Libya	Amman, Jordan
	Ja'afar 3'; Fawzi 18'; Hamad 32'		El Masli 16'	Stadium: Amman International Stadium; Attendance: 15,000; Referee: Nabeel Ayaad

31 August 1999 1999 Arab Games	Jordan	4–4 (a.e.t.) (3–1 p)	Iraq	Amman, Jordan
	Abu Zema 30' (pen.); Al-Shagran 51', 70'; Shneishel 67' (o.g.)		Fawzi 73', 75' (pen.); Mahmoud 78'; Farhan 87'	Stadium: Amman International Stadium; Attendance: 30,000; Referee: Jamal Al-Ghandour
	Penalties
	Abu Zema (penalty scored); Al-Shagran (penalty scored); Al-Sheikh (penalty missed); Sufian (penalty scored)		(penalty scored) Shneishel; (penalty missed) Fawzi; (penalty missed) Mezher; (penalty missed) Rahim

31 October 1999 1999 Friendship Tournament	Estonia	1–1	Iraq	Abu Dhabi, United Arab Emirates
11:00			Kadhim	Stadium: National Stadium

1 November 1999 1999 Friendship Tournament	Iraq	3–0	Turkmenistan	Abu Dhabi, United Arab Emirates
10:00	Wahaib; Hamad; Fawzi			Stadium: National Stadium

3 November 1999 1999 Friendship Tournament	Iraq	2–2	United Arab Emirates	Abu Dhabi, United Arab Emirates
13:00	Rahim; H.Mohammed			Stadium: National Stadium

== See also ==
- Iraq national football team results
