= 1984 Merlion Cup =

Tournament details
- Host country: Singapore
- Dates: 14–28 October 1984
- Teams: 8 (from 3 confederations)
- Venue: 1 (in 1 host city)

Final positions
- Champions: Iraq (1st title)
- Runners-up: South Korea U23
- Third place: Netherlands Amateur
- Fourth place: Australia U23

Tournament statistics
- Matches played: 16
- Goals scored: 52 (3.25 per match)

The 1984 Merlion Cup is the third edition of the invitational football tournament. Matches were held at the former Singapore National Stadium held from 14–28 October 1984.

== Group stage ==
=== Group A ===
Pos	Team	Pld	W	D	L	GF	GA	GD	Pts	
1	Netherlands Amateur	3	3	0	0	10	3	+7	6	Semifinal
2	Australia U23	3	2	0	1	5	6	−1	4	Semifinal
3	Singapore	3	1	0	2	6	4	+2	2	
4	Indonesia	3	0	0	3	2	10	−8	0	

Updated to match(es) played on unknown. Source:
14 October 1984

Singapore	1–2	Netherlands Amateur
	Report

Singapore National Stadium
14 October 1984

Australia U23	2–1	Indonesia
	Report

Singapore National Stadium

16 October 1984

Netherlands Amateur	3–0	Indonesia
	Report

Singapore National Stadium
19 October 1984

Singapore	0–1	Australia U23
	Report

Singapore National Stadium

21 October 1984

Netherlands Amateur	5–2	Australia U23
	Report

Singapore National Stadium
22 October 1984

Singapore	5–1	Indonesia
	Report

Singapore National Stadium

=== Group B ===
Pos	Team	Pld	W	D	L	GF	GA	GD	Pts	
1	Iraq	3	3	0	0	7	1	+6	6	Semifinal
2	South Korea U23	3	1	1	1	5	6	−1	3	Semifinal
3	Argentina U23	3	1	1	1	3	4	−1	3	
4	Chile U23	3	0	0	3	2	6	−4	0	

Updated to match(es) played on unknown. Source:
15 October 1984

Iraq	2–0	Argentina U23
Radhi 60'; Saeed 87'	Report

Singapore National Stadium
16 October 1984

South Korea U23	3–1	Chile U23
	Report

Singapore National Stadium

18 October 1984

Iraq	3–0	South Korea U23
Saeed 4'; Hashim 43'; Shihab 88'	Report

Singapore National Stadium
18 October 1984

Argentina U23	1–0	Chile U23
	Report

Singapore National Stadium

20 October 1984

Iraq	2–1	Chile U23
Saddam 60', 75'	Report	Marchant 31' (pen.)

Singapore National Stadium
21 October 1984

South Korea U23	2–2	Argentina U23
	Report

Singapore National Stadium

== Final round ==
=== Semi-finals ===
25 October 1984

South Korea U23	3–1	Netherlands Amateur
	Report

Singapore National Stadium
26 October 1984

Iraq	1–1 (a.e.t.)	Australia U23
Saeed 116'	Report	Farina 109'
Penalties
Ali (penalty scored); Saeed (penalty scored); Karim Allawi (penalty scored); Radhi (penalty missed); Hashim (penalty scored); Khalil Allawi (penalty scored); Shihab (penalty scored); Gorgis (penalty scored); Dirjal (penalty scored); Nsaief (penalty scored)	9–8	(penalty scored) Bernal; (penalty scored) Farina; (penalty scored) Panagis; (penalty scored) Maier; (penalty missed) Tredinnick; (penalty scored) Gregson; (penalty scored) Vlietstra; (penalty scored) Hooker; (penalty scored) Spink; (penalty missed) Mihailidis

Singapore National Stadium

=== Third place play-off ===
28 October 1984

Netherlands Amateur	3–0	Australia U23
	Report

Singapore National Stadium

=== Final ===
28 October 1984

Iraq	2–1 (a.e.t.)	South Korea U23
Saeed 43'; Munir 108'	Report	Kim Jong-boo 12'

Singapore National Stadium

== Awards ==
1984 Merlion Cup champions

Iraq
First title
