= Iraq at the FIFA World Cup =

International football delegation

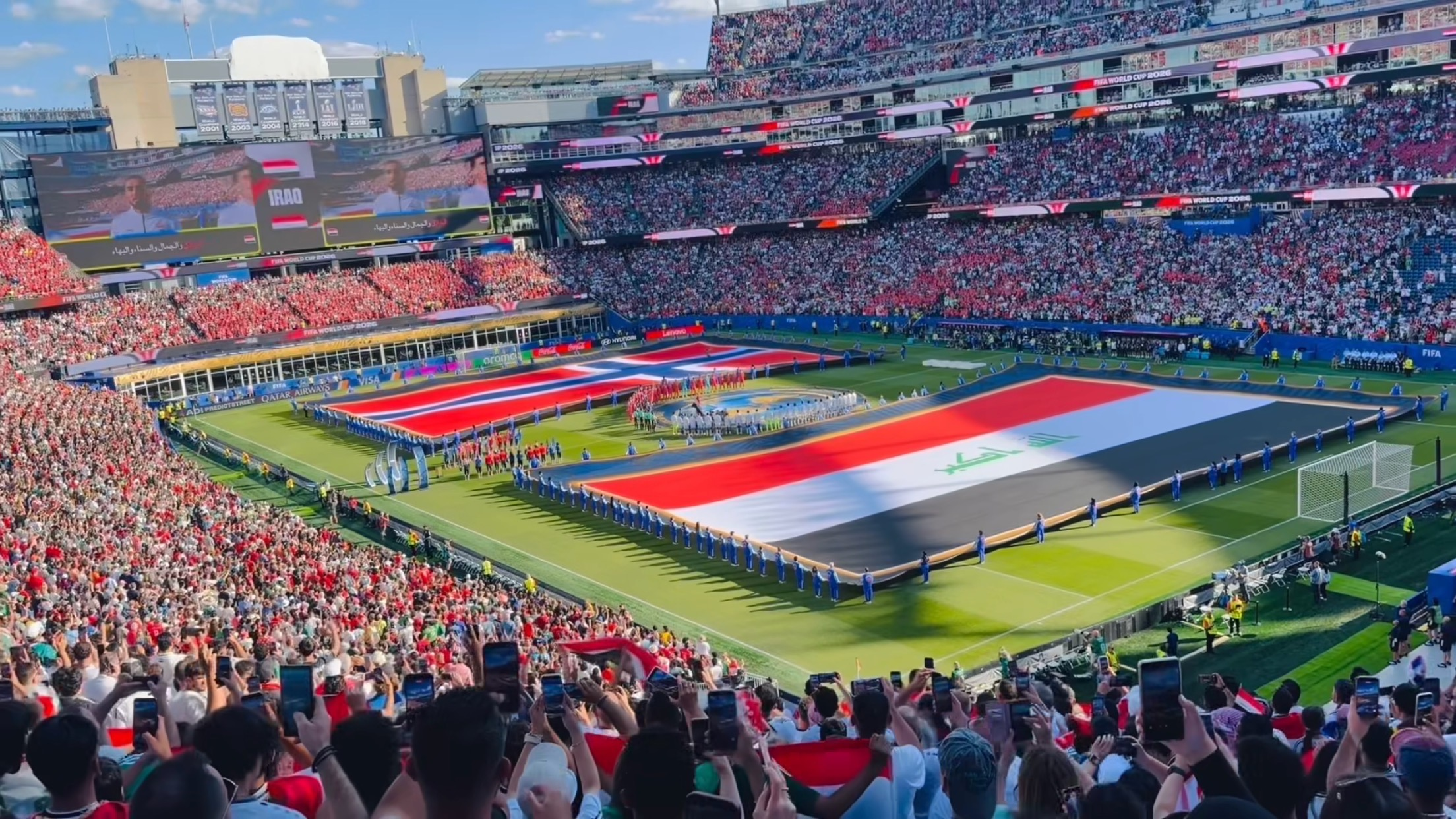
Pre-match display before Iraq's game against Norway at the 2026 FIFA World Cup

Iraq appeared in the FIFA World Cup for the first time in 1986. They ended up in last place in their group with zero points, scoring one goal.

Iraq qualified for the FIFA World Cup for the second time in 2026, again finishing in last place in their group with zero points and scoring one goal.

Both times they have qualified for a World Cup, Mexico was the host or co-host.

== Overall record ==
FIFA World Cup record										Qualification record					
Year	Round	Position	Pld	W	D	L	GF	GA	Squad	Pld	W	D	L	GF	GA
1930 to (Brazil) 1950	Not a FIFA member									Not a FIFA member					
(Switzerland) 1954 to 1970	Did not enter									Did not enter					
1974	Did not qualify									6	3	2	1	11	6
1978	Withdrew									Withdrew					
1982	Did not qualify									4	3	0	1	5	2
1986	Group stage	23rd	3	0	0	3	1	4	Squad	8	5	1	2	14	11
1990	Did not qualify									6	3	2	1	11	5
1994	Did not qualify									13	7	4	2	37	13
1998	Did not qualify									4	2	0	2	14	8
2002	Did not qualify									14	6	3	5	37	15
2006	Did not qualify									6	3	2	1	17	7
2010	Did not qualify									8	3	2	3	11	6
2014	Did not qualify									16	7	3	6	20	12
2018	Did not qualify									16	6	5	5	24	18
2022	Did not qualify									18	6	8	4	20	16
2026	Group stage	48th	3	0	0	3	1	12	Squad	21	13	5	3	32	14
(Morocco) (Portugal) (Spain) 2030	To be determined									To be determined					
(Saudi Arabia) 2034	To be determined									To be determined					
Total	Best: Group stage	2/19	6	0	0	6	2	16	—	140	67	37	36	253	133

== By match ==
Year	Round	Opponents	Score	Iraq scorers
(Mexico) 1986	Group B	Paraguay	0–1	—
(Mexico) 1986	Group B	Belgium	1–2	A. Radhi
(Mexico) 1986	Group B	Mexico	0–1	—
(Canada) (Mexico) (United States) 2026	Group I	Norway	1–4	A. Hussein
(Canada) (Mexico) (United States) 2026	Group I	France	0–3	—
(Canada) (Mexico) (United States) 2026	Group I	Senegal	0–5	—

== Iraq at the 1986 FIFA World Cup ==
Team	Pld	W	D	L	GF	GA	GD	Pts
Mexico	3	2	1	0	4	2	+2	5
Paraguay	3	1	2	0	4	3	+1	4
Belgium	3	1	1	1	5	5	0	3
Iraq	3	0	0	3	1	4	−3	0

=== Paraguay vs Iraq ===
This match caused controversy as the referee Edwin Picon-Ackong blew the whistle for half time a few seconds before Iraq striker Ahmed Radhi headed the ball into the goal, meaning that it did not count.

4 June 1986
12:00 CST

Paraguay	1–0	Iraq
Romerito 35'	Report

Estadio Nemesio Díez, Toluca
Attendance: 24,000
Referee: Edwin Picon-Ackong (Mauritius)

PARAGUAY:
GK	1	Roberto Fernández
DF	2	Juan Torales
DF	3	César Zabala
DF	4	Vladimiro Schettina	(yellow card) 45'
DF	5	Rogelio Delgado (c)
MF	6	Jorge Amado Nunes
MF	10	Adolfino Cañete
MF	8	Romerito
FW	7	Buenaventura Ferreira
FW	11	Alfredo Mendoza		(substituted off) 88'
FW	9	Roberto Cabañas
Substitutions:
MF	16	Jorge Guasch		(substituted on) 88'
Manager:
(Paraguay) Cayetano Ré

IRAQ:
GK	1	Raad Hammoudi (c)
DF	3	Khalil Allawi
DF	4	Nadhim Shaker
DF	5	Samir Shaker	(yellow card) 29'
DF	15	Natiq Hashim
DF	22	Ghanim Oraibi
MF	6	Ali Hussein Shihab
MF	7	Haris Mohammed		(substituted off) 67'
MF	14	Basil Gorgis		(substituted off) 81'
FW	10	Hussein Saeed
FW	8	Ahmed Radhi
Substitutions:
FW	11	Rahim Hameed		(substituted on) 67'
MF	19	Basim Qasim		(substituted on) 81'
Manager:
(Brazil) Evaristo de Macedo

=== Iraq vs Belgium ===
In the 16th minute of the match Belgium took the lead when Enzo Scifo scored with a low shot to the left corner of the net from the right from just inside the penalty area. It was 2–0 in the 21st minute when Nico Claesen scored a penalty low to the left corner of the net. Iraq pulled a goal back in the 59th minute when Ahmed Radhi scored a low shot to the left corner of the net from the right but Belgium went on to win 2–1.

8 June 1986
12:00 CST

Iraq	1–2	Belgium
Radhi 59'	Report	Scifo 16'; Claesen 21' (pen.)

Estadio Nemesio Díez, Toluca
Attendance: 20,000
Referee: Jesús Díaz (Colombia)

IRAQ:
GK	1	Raad Hammoudi (c)	(yellow card) 20'
DF	3	Khalil Allawi
DF	4	Nadhim Shaker	(yellow card) 29'
DF	5	Samir Shaker	(yellow card) 48'
DF	15	Natiq Hashim	(yellow card) 65'
DF	22	Ghanim Oraibi
MF	6	Ali Hussein Shihab
MF	7	Haris Mohammed	(yellow card) 42'
MF	14	Basil Gorgis	(yellow card) (red card) 52'
FW	9	Karim Saddam		(substituted off) 81'
FW	8	Ahmed Radhi
Substitutions:
FW	11	Rahim Hameed		(substituted on) 81'
Manager:
(Brazil) Evaristo de Macedo

BELGIUM:
GK	1	Jean-Marie Pfaff
DF	2	Eric Gerets
DF	3	Franky Van der Elst
DF	4	Michel De Wolf
MF	21	Stéphane Demol		(substituted off) 69'
MF	6	Franky Vercauteren
MF	7	René Vandereycken
MF	10	Philippe Desmet
MF	8	Enzo Scifo		(substituted off) 67'
MF	11	Jan Ceulemans (c)
FW	16	Nico Claesen	(yellow card) 16'
Substitutions:
DF	14	Lei Clijsters		(substituted on) 67'
DF	13	Georges Grün		(substituted on) 69'
Manager:
(Belgium) Guy Thys

=== Iraq vs Mexico ===
Fernando Quirarte scored the only goal of the game with a shot from a very tight angle on the right that beat the goalkeeper at his near post.

11 June 1986
12:00 CST

Iraq	0–1	Mexico
	Report	Quirarte 54'

Estadio Azteca, Mexico City
Attendance: 103,763
Referee: Zoran Petrović (Yugoslavia)

IRAQ:
GK	20	Fatah Nasif
DF	2	Maad Ibrahim
DF	3	Khalil Allawi (c)	(yellow card) 73'
DF	4	Nadhim Shaker
DF	15	Natiq Hashim		(substituted off) 60'
DF	22	Ghanim Oraibi
MF	6	Ali Hussein Shihab
MF	17	Anad Abid		(substituted off) 70'
MF	19	Basim Qasim
FW	9	Karim Saddam	(yellow card) 30'
FW	8	Ahmed Radhi
Substitutions:
FW	11	Rahim Hameed		(substituted on) 60'
MF	16	Shaker Mahmoud		(substituted on) 70'
Manager:
(Brazil) Evaristo de Macedo

MEXICO:
GK	1	Pablo Larios
DF	18	Rafael Amador	(substituted off) 62'
DF	3	Fernando Quirarte
DF	14	Félix Cruz
DF	17	Raúl Servín
MF	6	Carlos de los Cobos	(substituted off) 79'
MF	7	Miguel España
MF	10	Tomás Boy (c)
MF	13	Javier Aguirre
FW	22	Manuel Negrete
FW	15	Luis Flores
Substitutions:
MF	8	Alejandro Domínguez	(substituted on) 62'
FW	5	Francisco Javier Cruz	(substituted on) 79'
Manager:
(Socialist Federal Republic of Yugoslavia) Bora Milutinović

== Iraq at the 2026 FIFA World Cup ==
Team	Pld	W	D	L	GF	GA	GD	Pts
France	3	3	0	0	10	2	+8	9
Norway	3	2	0	1	8	7	+1	6
Senegal	3	1	0	2	8	6	+2	3
Iraq	3	0	0	3	1	12	−11	0

=== Iraq vs Norway ===
16 June 2026
18:00 UTC−4

Iraq	1–4	Norway
Hussein 39'	Report	Haaland 29', 43'; Østigård 76'; Hussein 90+6' (o.g.)

Gillette Stadium, Foxborough
Attendance: 63,106
Referee: Pierre Atcho (Gabon)

IRAQ:
GK	12	Jalal Hassan (c)
RB	3	Hussein Ali		(substituted off) 73'
CB	4	Zaid Tahseen	(yellow card) 86'
CB	5	Akam Hashim
LB	23	Merchas Doski
RM	8	Ibrahim Bayesh		(substituted off) 78'
CM	24	Zaid Ismail		(substituted off) 59'
CM	16	Amir Al-Ammari
LM	17	Ali Jasim		(substituted off) 73'
CF	18	Aymen Hussein
CF	9	Ali Al-Hamadi		(substituted off) 59'
Substitutions:
MF	21	Marko Farji		(substituted on) 59'
MF	14	Zidane Iqbal		(substituted on) 59'
DF	25	Mustafa Saadoon		(substituted on) 73'
MF	11	Ahmed Qasem		(substituted on) 73'
FW	10	Mohanad Ali		(substituted on) 78'
Manager:
(Australia) Graham Arnold

NORWAY:
GK	1	Ørjan Nyland
RB	26	Julian Ryerson
CB	3	Kristoffer Ajer
CB	17	Torbjørn Heggem
LB	5	David Møller Wolfe	(substituted off) 73'
DM	8	Sander Berge
CM	10	Martin Ødegaard (c)	(substituted off) 81'
CM	14	Fredrik Aursnes	(substituted off) 73'
RF	7	Alexander Sørloth	(substituted off) 73'
CF	9	Erling Haaland
LF	20	Antonio Nusa	(substituted off) 73'
Substitutions:
DF	4	Leo Østigård	(substituted on) 73'
MF	18	Kristian Thorstvedt	(substituted on) 73'
MF	21	Andreas Schjelderup	(substituted on) 73'
MF	22	Oscar Bobb	(substituted on) 73'
MF	6	Patrick Berg	(substituted on) 81'
Manager:
(Norway) Ståle Solbakken

=== France vs Iraq ===
22 June 2026
17:00 UTC−4

France	3–0	Iraq
Mbappé 14', 54'; Dembélé 66'	Report

Lincoln Financial Field, Philadelphia
Attendance: 68,324
Referee: Drew Fischer (Canada)

FRANCE:
GK	16	Mike Maignan
RB	5	Jules Koundé	(substituted off) 83'
CB	4	Dayot Upamecano
CB	17	William Saliba
LB	3	Lucas Digne
CM	6	Manu Koné
CM	14	Adrien Rabiot
RW	7	Ousmane Dembélé	(substituted off) 68'
AM	11	Michael Olise	(substituted off) 68'
LW	12	Bradley Barcola	(substituted off) 83'
CF	10	Kylian Mbappé (c)	(substituted off) 90+1'
Substitutions:
FW	20	Désiré Doué	(substituted on) 68'
MF	24	Rayan Cherki	(substituted on) 68'
MF	25	Maghnes Akliouche	(substituted on) 83'
DF	2	Malo Gusto	(substituted on) 83'
FW	9	Marcus Thuram	(substituted on) 90+1'
Manager:
(France) Didier Deschamps

IRAQ:
GK	22	Ahmed Basil
RB	3	Hussein Ali
CB	4	Zaid Tahseen		(substituted off) 60'
CB	5	Akam Hashim
LB	23	Merchas Doski
CM	24	Zaid Ismail		(substituted off) 60'
CM	16	Amir Al-Ammari	(yellow card) 6'	(substituted off) 68'
RW	11	Ahmed Qasem
AM	14	Zidane Iqbal
LW	8	Ibrahim Bayesh		(substituted off) 68'
CF	18	Aymen Hussein (c)		(substituted off) 26'
Substitutions:
FW	9	Ali Al-Hamadi		(substituted on) 26'
DF	2	Rebin Sulaka		(substituted on) 60'
MF	7	Youssef Amyn		(substituted on) 60'
MF	20	Aimar Sher		(substituted on) 68'
MF	21	Marko Farji		(substituted on) 68'
Manager:
(Australia) Graham Arnold

=== Senegal vs Iraq ===
26 June 2026
15:00 UTC−4

Senegal	5–0	Iraq
Diarra 4'; I. Sarr 56'; P. Gueye 59', 71'; I. Ndiaye 82'	Report

BMO Field, Toronto
Attendance: 43,036
Referee: Anthony Taylor (England)

SENEGAL:
GK	23	Mory Diaw
RB	15	Krépin Diatta
CB	4	Abdoulaye Seck	(yellow card) 18'	(substituted off) 58'
CB	19	Moussa Niakhaté
LB	14	Ismail Jakobs
DM	5	Idrissa Gueye (c)
CM	21	Habib Diarra		(substituted off) 56'
CM	8	Lamine Camara		(substituted off) 56'
RF	20	Ibrahim Mbaye		(substituted off) 56'
CF	18	Ismaïla Sarr		(substituted off) 81'
LF	10	Sadio Mané
Substitutions:
FW	11	Nicolas Jackson		(substituted on) 56'
FW	13	Iliman Ndiaye		(substituted on) 56'
MF	26	Pape Gueye	(yellow card) 81'	(substituted on) 56'
MF	6	Pathé Ciss		(substituted on) 58'
FW	7	Assane Diao		(substituted on) 81'
Manager:
(Senegal) Pape Thiaw

IRAQ:
GK	22	Ahmed Basil		(substituted off) 46'
RB	26	Frans Putros
CB	2	Rebin Sulaka	(red card) 13'
CB	5	Akam Hashim
LB	23	Merchas Doski	(yellow card) 90'
RM	11	Ahmed Qasem		(substituted off) 16'
CM	14	Zidane Iqbal		(substituted off) 67'
CM	16	Amir Al-Ammari	(yellow card) 75'
LM	8	Ibrahim Bayesh (c)
CF	9	Ali Al-Hamadi		(substituted off) 57'
CF	17	Ali Jasim		(substituted off) 57'
Substitutions:
DF	6	Manaf Younis		(substituted on) 16'
GK	12	Jalal Hassan		(substituted on) 46'
DF	15	Ahmed Maknzi		(substituted on) 57'
FW	13	Ali Yousif		(substituted on) 57'
MF	19	Kevin Yakob		(substituted on) 67'
Manager:
(Australia) Graham Arnold

== Player records ==
=== Most appearances ===
Seven players were fielded in all three of Iraq's matches in 1986. Khalil Allawi, Ghanim Oraibi, Ahmed Radhi, Nadhim Shaker and Ali Hussein Shihab played every single minute. Rahim Hameed came on as a substitute in each match, replacing fellow record holder Natiq Hashim in the last match.

Seven players were fielded in all three of Iraq's matches in 2026. Merchas Doski and Akam Hashim played every single minute. Amir Al-Ammari and Ibrahim Bayesh started all three matches, while Ali Al-Hamadi, Zidane Iqbal and Ahmed Qasem each started two matches and made one substitute appearance.

Player	Matches	1986	2026
Amir Al-Ammari	3	0	3
Ali Al-Hamadi	3	0	3
Khalil Allawi	3	3	0
Ibrahim Bayesh	3	0	3
Merchas Doski	3	0	3
Rahim Hameed	3	3	0
Akam Hashim	3	0	3
Natiq Hashim	3	3	0
Zidane Iqbal	3	0	3
Ghanim Oraibi	3	3	0
Ahmed Qasem	3	0	3
Ahmed Radhi	3	3	0
Nadhim Shaker	3	3	0
Ali Hussein Shihab	3	3	0

=== Goalscorers ===
Iraq has scored a total of two goals at the FIFA World Cup. The first was scored by Ahmed Radhi against Belgium in 1986, and the second was scored by Aymen Hussein against Norway in 2026.

Player	Goals	1986	2026
Ahmed Radhi	1	1	0
Aymen Hussein	1	0	1
Total	2	1	1

== See also ==
- Asian nations at the FIFA World Cup
- Iraq at the AFC Asian Cup
