= 1985 President's Cup Football Tournament =

1985 President's Cup
Tournament details
- Host country: South Korea
- Dates: 1–17 June
- Teams: 12

Final positions
- Champions: South Korea (9th title)
- Runners-up: South Korea B
- Third place: (Brazil) Bangu
- Fourth place: Iraq

Tournament statistics
- Matches played: 28
- Goals scored: 92 (3.29 per match)
- Attendance: 176,000 (6,286 per match)
- Top scorer: (Iraq) Karim Saddam (6+ goals)

The 1985 President's Cup Football Tournament (Korean: 제15회 대통령배 국제축구대회) was the 15th competition of Korea Cup. The competition was held from 1 to 8 June 1985, and was won by South Korea for the ninth time, who defeated South Korea B in the final. It attracted a total of 176,000 spectators.

== First group stage ==
=== Group A ===
Team	Pld	W	D	L	GF	GA	GD	Pts	Qualification
South Korea B	2	2	0	0	10	2	+8	4	Qualification to second group stage
Bahrain	2	1	0	1	5	5	0	2	Qualification to second group stage
Malaysia	2	0	0	2	1	9	–8	0	

1 June 1985
15:30 KST

South Korea B	4–2	Bahrain
Kim Jong-boo 31', 52'; Chung Dong-bok 50'; Kim Jun-hyun 85'	Report; Newscast	Hamad 45'; ? 78' (pen.)

Dongdaemun Stadium, Seoul

3 June 1985
17:30 KST

Bahrain	3–1	Malaysia
Hadan 59'; Mohamed 64'; Fahad 81'	Report	Husin 36'

Dongdaemun Stadium, Seoul

5 June 1985
17:20 KST

South Korea B	6–0	Malaysia
Chung Dong-bok 7', 87'; Kim Jong-boo 30'; Kim Sam-soo 57'; Cho Min-kook 79'; Kim Joo-sung 83'	Report

Daejeon Hanbat Sports Complex, Daejeon

=== Group B ===
Team	Pld	W	D	L	GF	GA	GD	Pts	Qualification
Iraq	2	1	1	0	7	5	+2	3	Qualification to second group stage
(Brazil) Bangu	2	1	1	0	5	4	+1	3	Qualification to second group stage
(Belgium) Lierse	2	0	0	2	5	8	–3	0	

1 June 1985
17:20 KST

Bangu (Brazil)	3–2	(Belgium) Lierse
Marinho ?', ?'; Ado ?'

Dongdaemun Stadium, Seoul

3 June 1985
19:20 KST

Lierse (Belgium)	3–5	Iraq
Roberto 4'; Dirk 35', 46'	Report	Saddam 6', 68'; Allawi 31'; Shaker 38'; Hashim 79'

Dongdaemun Stadium, Seoul

5 June 1985
15:30 KST

Bangu (Brazil)	2–2	Iraq
Gilson Gênio 12'; Mário 15'	Report	Allawi 42'; Munir 62'

Daejeon Hanbat Sports Complex, Daejeon

=== Group C ===
Team	Pld	W	D	L	GF	GA	GD	Pts	Qualification
South Korea	2	1	1	0	4	3	+1	3	Qualification to second group stage
(Argentina) Huracán	2	1	1	0	2	1	+1	3	Qualification to second group stage
Thailand	2	0	0	2	2	4	–2	0	

2 June 1985
16:50 KST

Huracán (Argentina)	1–0	Thailand

Dongdaemun Stadium, Seoul

4 June 1985
19:20 KST

South Korea	1–1	(Argentina) Huracán
Baek Jong-chul 75'	Report; Newscast	García 21'

Dongdaemun Stadium, Seoul

6 June 1985
17:20 KST

South Korea	3–2	Thailand
Choi Soon-ho 2'; Park Chang-sun 48' (pen.); Lee Tae-ho 75'	Report	Somchai 7'; Witthaya 88' (pen.)

Daejeon Hanbat Sports Complex, Daejeon

=== Group D ===
Team	Pld	W	D	L	GF	GA	GD	Pts	Qualification
(Uruguay) Central Español	2	1	1	0	3	1	+2	3	Qualification to second group stage
Canada	2	1	1	0	2	1	+1	3	Qualification to second group stage
Ghana	2	0	0	2	2	5	–3	0	

2 June 1985
15:00 KST

Ghana	1–2	Canada
Abedi Pele ?'	Report	Mitchell 9' (pen.); Norman 37'

Dongdaemun Stadium, Seoul

4 June 1985
17:30 KST

Canada	0–0	(Uruguay) Central Español

Dongdaemun Stadium, Seoul

6 June 1985
15:30 KST

Ghana	1–3	(Uruguay) Central Español

Daejeon Hanbat Sports Complex, Daejeon

== Second group stage ==
=== Group A ===
Team	Pld	W	D	L	GF	GA	GD	Pts	Qualification
South Korea	3	2	1	0	6	2	+4	5	Qualification to semi-finals
(Brazil) Bangu	3	1	2	0	4	1	+3	4	Qualification to semi-finals
(Uruguay) Central Español	3	0	2	1	2	3	–1	2	
Bahrain	3	0	1	2	1	7	–6	1	

8 June 1985
15:00 KST

Central Español (Uruguay)	0–0	(Brazil) Bangu

Gwangju Mudeung Stadium, Gwangju

8 June 1985
16:50 KST

South Korea	3–0	Bahrain
Choi Soon-ho 6', 55'; Lee Tae-ho 88'	Report

Gwangju Mudeung Stadium, Gwangju

10 June 1985
17:30 KST

South Korea	2–1	(Uruguay) Central Español
Cho Kwang-rae 20'; Lee Tae-ho 67'	Report	Pereira 77'

Daegu Civic Stadium, Daegu

10 June 1985
19:20 KST

Bangu (Brazil)	3–0	Bahrain
Pingo 38'; Lulinha 59', 60'	Report

Daegu Civic Stadium, Daegu

12 June 1985
17:30 KST

Bahrain	1–1	(Uruguay) Central Español

Dongdaemun Stadium, Seoul

12 June 1985
19:20 KST

South Korea	1–1	(Brazil) Bangu
Lee Tae-ho 50'	Report	Ado 86'

Dongdaemun Stadium, Seoul

=== Group B ===
Team	Pld	W	D	L	GF	GA	GD	Pts	Qualification
South Korea B	3	3	0	0	6	1	+5	6	Qualification to semi-finals
Iraq	3	2	0	1	11	4	+7	4	Qualification to semi-finals
Canada	3	1	0	2	3	8	–5	2	
(Argentina) Huracán	3	0	0	3	4	11	–7	0	

9 June 1985
15:00 KST

Canada	1–6	Iraq
Catliff ?'		Saddam ?', ?', ?'; Allawi ?'; Hashim ?'; ? ?'

Gwangju Mudeung Stadium, Gwangju

9 June 1985
16:50 KST

South Korea B	4–1	(Argentina) Huracán
Kim Jong-boo 22'; Kim Joo-sung 28'; Lee Kee-keun 57'; Noh Soo-jin 78'	Report	Dario 75'

Gwangju Mudeung Stadium, Gwangju

11 June 1985
17:30 KST

Huracán (Argentina)	2–5	Iraq
Claudio 55'; Janin 61'	Report	(Note: Kyunghyang: Karim Allawi (5'), Abdel (17', 67'), unknown player (75')) (Note: RSSSF: Ahmed Radhi (?', ?'), Wamidh Munir (?'), Basil Gorgis (?')); Saddam 85'

Daegu Civic Stadium, Daegu

11 June 1985
19:20 KST

South Korea B	1–0	Canada
Kim Joo-sung 78'	Report

Daegu Civic Stadium, Daegu

13 June 1985
17:30 KST

Huracán (Argentina)	1–2	Canada
? ?'		Karpun ?', ?'

Dongdaemun Stadium, Seoul

13 June 1985
19:20 KST

South Korea B	1–0	Iraq
Kim Pan-keun 77'	Report

Dongdaemun Stadium, Seoul

== Knockout stage ==
=== Bracket ===
Semi-finals
15 June – Seoul
South Korea	2
Iraq	0
15 June – Seoul
South Korea B (p)	1 (4)
(Brazil) Bangu	1 (2)

Final
17 June – Seoul
South Korea	1
South Korea B	0
Third place play-off
17 June – Seoul
Iraq	1 (4)
(Brazil) Bangu (p)	1 (5)

=== Semi-finals ===
15 June 1985
15:00 KST

South Korea	2–0	Iraq
Choi Soon-ho 2', 87'	Report

Dongdaemun Stadium, Seoul

15 June 1985
16:50 KST

South Korea B	1–1 (a.e.t.)	(Brazil) Bangu
Kim Joo-sung 60'	Report	Marinho 51'
Penalties
Kang Jae-soon (penalty missed)	4–2	(penalty missed) Baby; (penalty missed) Marinho

Dongdaemun Stadium, Seoul

=== Third place match ===
17 June 1985
17:00 KST

Iraq	1–1	(Brazil) Bangu
? ?'	Report	? ?' (o.g.)
Penalties
	4–5

Dongdaemun Stadium, Seoul

=== Final ===
17 June 1985
18:50 KST

South Korea	1–0	South Korea B
Byun Byung-joo 74'	Report; Newscast

Dongdaemun Stadium, Seoul

== See also ==
- Korea Cup
- South Korea national football team results
