= Ghanim Oraibi =

Iraqi footballer

Ghanim Oraibi Jassim
Personal information
- Full name: Ghanim Oraibi Jassim Al-Roubai
- Date of birth: 16 August 1961 (age 65)
- Place of birth: Baghdad, Iraq
- Height: 1.70 m (5 ft 7 in)
- Position: Defender

Senior career*
Years	Team	Apps	(Gls)
1979–1982	Al-Amana		
1982–1990	Al-Shabab		
1990–1991	Al-Talaba SC		
1991–1993	Al-Amana		
1993–1995	Al-Shabab		

International career
1985–1989	Iraq	60	(0)
- * Club domestic league appearances and goals

Ghanim Oraibi Jassim Al-Roubai (Arabic: غَانِم عُرَيْبِيّ جَاسِم الرَّبِيعِيّ; born 16 August 1961) is an Iraqi football defender who played for Iraq in the 1986 FIFA World Cup. He also played for Al-Shabab.

== Career ==
Oraibi played as left-back, from 1979 ti 1982 fir Al-Amana, for seven years by Al-Shabab and for his 2nd time with Al-Amana.

=== International ===
He played in all of Iraq's 1986 World Cup games in Mexico. Against Belgium he stamped on Enzo Scifo but the referee sent off Basil Gorgis by mistake. In 1977 at the age of 16, he joined the Amana youth team playing alongside Basil Gorgis, Natiq Hashim and Karim Allawi.

Ghanim was first called up by coach Vojo Gardesevic for the 1982 World Cup qualifiers, but was given his first start by Jorge Vieira in the 3–2 win over UAE in 1985.

== Personal life ==
Oraibi's son Zulfikar died in a car bomb attack in Karrada, Baghdad on 3 July 2016.
