= Ali Hussein Shihab =

Iraqi footballer (1961–2016)

Personal information
- Full name: Ali Hussein Shihab
- Date of birth: 5 May 1961
- Place of birth: Iraq
- Date of death: 26 October 2016 (aged 55)
- Position: Midfielder

Senior career*
Years	Team	Apps	(Gls)
1978–1994	Al-Talaba		
1994–1995	Al Ahli SC (Tripoli)		
1995–2000	Brusk		

International career
1981–1989	Iraq	73	(13)
- * Club domestic league appearances and goals

Ali Hussein Shihab (Arabic:علي حسين شهاب ; May 5, 1961 – October 26, 2016) was an Iraqi football midfielder who played for Iraq in the 1986 FIFA World Cup. He also played for Al-Talaba.

Ali Hussein was an industrious player who was a regular in the midfield in the Iraqi national team during the 1980s, alongside one-time Talaba teammates Haris Mohammed, Natiq Hashim and Basil Gorgis.

Ali was part of a Talaba team that included Iraqi internationals Jamal Ali and Hussein Saeed which won three league titles during the 80s. He played in all three games in the 1986 World Cup lining up against Paraguay, Belgium and hosts Mexico. Ali was also part of the team that won the 1982 Asian Games in India, which included Raad Hammoudi, Falah Hassan and Hussein Saeed.

Ali died on 26 October 2016 of a terminal illness.

== Career statistics ==
=== International goals ===
Scores and results list Iraq's goal tally first.

No	Date	Venue	Opponent	Score	Result	Competition
1.	20 November 1982	Jawaharlal Nehru Stadium, New Delhi	Burma	3–0	4–0	1982 Asian Games
2.	25 November 1982	Jawaharlal Nehru Stadium, New Delhi	Kuwait	1–2	1–2	1982 Asian Games
3.	3 August 1984	Navy–Marine Corps Memorial Stadium, Annapolis	Yugoslavia	2–0	2–4	1984 Summer Olympics
