= Tariq Aziz Brisam =

Iraqi footballer (1945–2014)

Tariq Aziz
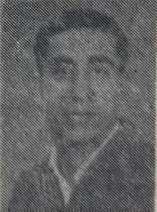

Personal information
- Full name: Tariq Aziz Brisam
- Date of birth: 1 July 1945
- Place of birth: Iraq
- Date of death: 24 May 2014 (aged 68)
- Place of death: Baghdad, Iraq
- Position: Forward

Senior career*
Years	Team	Apps	(Gls)
1963–1976	Al-Shorta		

International career
1967–1971	Iraq		
- * Club domestic league appearances and goals

Tariq Aziz (1 July 1945 – 24 May 2014) was an Iraqi football striker who played for Iraq between 1967 and 1971. He also played for Al-Shorta.

On 24 May 2014, Aziz died at the age of 68.

== Career statistics ==
=== International goals ===
Scores and results list Iraq's goal tally first.

No	Date	Venue	Opponent	Score	Result	Competition
1.	19 September 1971	Mithat Paşa Stadium, Istanbul	Lebanon	2–0	2–1	1972 Olympics qualifiers
