= Kadhim Hussein =

Iraqi footballer

Personal information
- Full name: Kadhim Hussein Abdullah
- Date of birth: 30 November 1977 (age 48)
- Position: Midfielder

Senior career*
Years	Team	Apps	(Gls)
1999–2002	Al-Quwa Al-Jawiya		
2004–2010	Al-Najaf		
2006–2007	→ Busaiteen (loan)		(2)

International career
2000–2001	Iraq	10	(0)
- * Club domestic league appearances and goals

Kadhim Hussein Abdullah (Arabic: كَاظِم حُسَيْن عَبْد الله; born 30 November 1977) is an Iraqi former footballer who played as a midfielder. He represented the Iraq national team at the 2000 WAFF Championship.
