= Amer Mushraf =

Iraqi association football player

Personal information
- Full name: Amer Mushraf Mohsin
- Date of birth: 1 July 1975 (age 51)
- Place of birth: Iraq
- Position: Forward

International career
Years	Team	Apps	(Gls)
1995–2001	Iraq		

Amer Mushraf Mohsin (Arabic: عَامِر مُشَرَّف مُحْسِن; born 1 July 1975) is a former Iraqi football forward who played for Iraq in the 2002 FIFA World Cup qualification. He played for the national team between 1995 and 2001.

On 23 April 2001, Amer scored his first goal against Nepal.

== International career ==
=== International goals ===
Scores and results list Iraq's goal tally first.

No	Date	Venue	Opponent	Score	Result	Competition
1.	23 April 2001	Almaty Central Stadium, Almaty	Nepal	4–1	4–2	2002 FIFA World Cup qualification
