= Abbas Hassan Hassun =

Iraqi association football player

Abbas Hassan
Personal information
- Full name: Abbas Hassan Hassun
- Date of birth: 1 July 1978 (age 48)
- Place of birth: Iraq
- Position: Forward

International career
Years	Team	Apps	(Gls)
2001–2003	Iraq		

Abbas Hassan Hassun (Arabic: عَبَّاس حَسَن حَسُّون; born 1 July 1978) is a former Iraqi football forward who played for Iraq in the 2002 FIFA World Cup qualification. He played for the national team between 2001 and 2003.

On 21 April 2001, Abbas scored his first two goals against Macau.

== Career statistics ==
=== International goals ===
Scores and results list Iraq's goal tally first.

No	Date	Venue	Opponent	Score	Result	Competition
1.	21 April 2001	Almaty Central Stadium, Almaty	Macau	2–0	5–0	2002 FIFA World Cup qualification
2.	21 April 2001	Almaty Central Stadium, Almaty	Macau	5–0	5–0	2002 FIFA World Cup qualification
