= Sergio Marchant =

Chilean footballer (1961–2020)

Personal information
- Full name: Sergio Armando Marchant Muñoz
- Date of birth: 17 September 1961
- Date of death: 15 May 2020 (aged 58)
- Position: Midfielder

Senior career*
Years	Team	Apps	(Gls)
1980–1985	Unión San Felipe		
1986	Naval		
1987–1988	Arturo Fernández Vial		
1989–1991	Deportes Antofagasta		
1992–1993	Deportes Temuco		
1993	Santiago Wanderers		
1994	Rangers de Talca		
1995	Unión San Felipe		
1995–1998	Deportes Antofagasta		
- * Club domestic league appearances and goals

Sergio Armando Marchant Muñoz (17 September 1961 – 15 May 2020) was a Chilean footballer who played as a midfielder.
