= Jassim Swadi =

Iraqi footballer

Personal information
- Full name: Jassim Swadi Fayadh
- Date of birth: 15 December 1975 (age 50)
- Place of birth: Baghdad, Iraq
- Height: 1.80 m (5 ft 11 in)
- Position: Midfielder

Senior career*
Years	Team	Apps	(Gls)
1994–1996	Al-Zawraa		
1996–1998	Al-Quwa Al-Jawiya		
1998–2000	Al-Zawraa		
2000–2004	Al-Quwa Al-Jawiya		
2004–2005	Macclesfield Town	1	(0)
2005–2006	Apollon Limassol		
2006–2007	Al-Shorta		
2007–2008	Al-Ramtha SC		
2008	Al-Quwa Al-Jawiya		
2008–2009	Najaf FC		
2009–2012	Al-Kahraba		

International career^{‡}
1998–2006	Iraq	21	(4)
- * Club domestic league appearances and goals as of N/A ‡ National team caps and goals as of 13 February 2006

Jassim Swadi Fayadh (Arabic: جاسم سوادي فياض; born 15 December 1975 in Iraq) is a former Iraqi football player who last played for Al-Kahraba in Iraq.

Jassim Swadi is a left-footed player who is able to play anywhere in defence, midfield or even up front, started with Baghdad-based club Al-Nafat in 1991 before later moving across the capital to join Al-Shorta in 1993 and then to Al-Quwa Al-Jawiya in 1996.

He also played in England and Cyprus, where he won a league title.

== International goals ==
Scores and results list Iraq's goal tally first.

#	Date	Venue	Opponent	Score	Result	Competition
1.	13 August 2003	Azadi Stadium, Teheran	Iran	1–0	1–0	Friendly match
2.	8 October 2003	Bukit Jalil Stadium, Kuala Lumpur	Bahrain	2–0	5–1	2004 AFC Asian Cup qualification
3.	22 October 2003	Thuwunna Stadium, Manama	Myanmar	3–1	3-1	2004 AFC Asian Cup qualification
4.	9 June 2004	King Abdullah Stadium, Amman	Chinese Taipei	5–1	6-1	2006 World Cup qualifier
