= Emad Jassim =

Iraqi footballer

Personal information
- Full name: Emad Jassim Mahmoud
- Date of birth: 17 August 1960 (age 66)
- Position: Forward

Senior career*
Years	Team	Apps	(Gls)
- Al-Quwa Al-Jawiya
- Al-Zawra'a SC
- Al-Quwa Al-Jawiya
- Al-Khutoot
- ِAlSalam

International career
1982–1988	Iraq	41	(2)
- * Club domestic league appearances and goals

Emad Jassim (born 17 August 1960) is an Iraqi former footballer. He competed in the men's tournament at the 1984 Summer Olympics.

== Career statistics ==
=== International ===
Appearances and goals by national team and year
National team	Year	Apps	Goals
Iraq	1982	5	1
Iraq	1983	–	
Iraq	1984	18	1
Iraq	1985	7	0
Iraq	1986	8	0
Iraq	1987	–	
Iraq	1988	3	0
Total		41	2

Scores and results list Iraq's goal tally first, score column indicates score after each Jassim goal.

List of international goals scored by Emad Jassim
No.	Date	Venue	Opponent	Score	Result	Competition
1	28 November 1982	Jawaharlal Nehru Stadium, New Delhi, India	Japan	1–0	1–0 (a.e.t.)	1982 Asian Games
2	18 April 1984	National Stadium, Kallang, Singapore	Thailand	2–1	2–1	1984 Summer Olympics qualification
