= Saad Jassim =

Iraqi footballer (1959–2019)

Personal information
- Date of birth: 4 August 1959
- Date of death: 8 April 2019 (aged 59)
- Place of death: Iraq
- Position: Midfielder

Senior career*
Years	Team	Apps	(Gls)
1976-1977	Al-Zawraa		
1977-1982	Al-Jaish		
1982-1983	Al-Shabab		
1983-1985	Al-Rasheed		
1985-1988	Al-Zawraa		

International career
1978–1983	Iraq	29	
- * Club domestic league appearances and goals

Saad Jassim (Arabic: سَعْد جَاسِم; 4 August 1959 – 8 April 2019) was an Iraqi footballer. He played at the men's tournament at the 1980 Summer Olympics and 1982 Asian Games, winning the gold medal at the latter.
