= Mahdi Kadhim =

Iraqi association football player

Personal information
- Full name: Mahdi Kadhim Hussein
- Date of birth: 1 July 1967 (age 59)
- Place of birth: Iraq
- Position: Midfielder

International career
Years	Team	Apps	(Gls)
1992–1993	Iraq	2	(2)

Mahdi Kadhim Hussein (Arabic: مَهْدِيّ كَاظِم حُسَيْن; born 1 July 1967) is an Iraqi former football midfielder who played for Iraq in the 1994 FIFA World Cup qualification. He played for the national team between 1992 and 1993.

Madhi played two matches for Iraq and scored in the 1994 FIFA World Cup qualification against Yemen.

== Career statistics ==
=== International goals ===
Scores and results list Iraq's goal tally first.

No	Date	Venue	Opponent	Score	Result	Competition
1.	18 August 1992	Al-Hassan Stadium, Irbid	Ethiopia	11–0	13–0	1992 Jordan Tournament
2.	26 May 1993	Al-Hassan Stadium, Irbid	Yemen	3–0	6–1	1994 FIFA World Cup qualification
