= Taiseer Abdul-Hussein =

Iraqi footballer and coach

Personal information
- Full name: Taiseer Abdul-Hussein Mohammad
- Date of birth: 30 November 1978 (age 47)
- Place of birth: Iraq
- Position: Midfielder

Senior career*
Years	Team	Apps	(Gls)
1995–1996	Kirkuk		
1996–1997	Al-Jaish		
1997–1998	Salahaddin		
1998–2000	Al-Karkh		
2000–2001	Al-Zawraa		
2001–2002	Duhok		
2002–2008	Al-Shorta		
2008–2011	Amanat Baghdad		
2011–2013	Al-Baqa'a		
2013–2015	Masafi Al-Wasat		
2015–2016	Al-Sinaa		

International career
2001	Iraq U-23		
2001	Iraq		

Managerial career
- 2021: Al-Qasim SC (Assist.)
- 2021: Al-Mina'a SC (Assist.)
- * Club domestic league appearances and goals

Taiseer Abdul-Hussein Mohammad (Arabic: تَيْسِير عَبْد الْحُسَيْن مُحَمَّد; born 30 November 1978) is a coach and former international Iraqi football player, he played as a midfielder.
