= 1995 Nehru Cup =

Tournament details
- Host country: India
- Teams: 5 (from 2 confederations)
- Venue(s): 1 (in 1 host city)

Final positions
- Champions: Iraq (1st title)
- Runners-up: Russia U20

Tournament statistics
- Matches played: 11
- Goals scored: 26 (2.36 per match)

1995 Nehru Cup was held in Calcutta. This was the third time that Calcutta hosted Nehru Cup. and the 11th edition of the cup. The participating teams were Iraq, Russia U-20, Thailand, Uzbekistan U-20, India. Iraq won the tournament, defeating Russia U-20 1–0 in the final match, played at the Salt Lake Stadium. Baichung Bhutia, the future star striker for India debuted in this tourney and scored one goal for India in the tournament.

== Matches ==
Pos	Team	Pld	W	D	L	GF	GA	GD	Pts	
1	Russia U20	4	2	2	0	6	1	+5	8	Final
2	Iraq	4	2	2	0	7	3	+4	8	Final
3	Thailand	4	1	1	2	7	5	+2	4	
4	India	4	1	1	2	2	9	−7	4	
5	Uzbekistan U20	4	1	0	3	2	6	−4	3	

Updated to match(es) played on unknown. Source:

Iraq	3–1	Uzbekistan U20
	Report

Russia U20	1–1	Thailand
	Report

Russia U20	0–0	Iraq
	Report

10 March 1995

India	0–5	Thailand
	Report	Phanuwat Yinphan; Kovid Foythong; Somrrit Ornsomjit; Cherdai Suwannang

Russia U20	2–0	Uzbekistan U20
	Report

12 March 1995

India	1–1	Iraq
Tousif Jamal	Report	Obeid

14 March 1995

Iraq	3–1	Thailand
	Report

22 March 1995

India	1–0	Uzbekistan U20
Baichung Bhutia	Report

Uzbekistan U20	1–0	Thailand
	Report

24 March 1995

Russia U20	3–0	India
	Report

=== Final ===
Iraq	1–0	Russia U20
	Report

Salt Lake Stadium, Kolkata

== Winners ==
1995 Nehru Cup champion

Iraq
First title
