= Razzaq Farhan =

Iraqi footballer and Olympic athlete

Personal information
- Full name: Razzaq Farhan Mussa
- Date of birth: 1 July 1974 (age 52)
- Place of birth: Baghdad, Iraq
- Height: 1.85 m (6 ft 1 in)
- Position: Striker

Youth career
- 1992–1993: Al-Madhtiya
- 1993–1994: Al-Qasim

Senior career*
Years	Team	Apps	(Gls)
1994–1995	Babil SC		
1995–1998	Al-Quwa Al-Jawiya		
1998–1999	Bahrain Club		(10)
1999	Al-Quwa Al-Jawiya		
1999–2002	Sharjah FC		(63)
2002–2003	Bahrain Club		
2003	Al Khaleej		
2003–2004	Sharjah FC		
2004	Al-Shamal		(15)
2004–2005	Qatar SC		(7)
2005	Riffa Club		
2005–2006	Dubai Club		
2006–2007	Ajman FC		
2007	Bahrain Club		(8)
2007–2008	Al-Baqa'a SC		(10)
2008–2009	Al-Faisaly		(19)
2009–2012	Al-Quwa Al-Jawiya		(7)

International career
2004	Iraq Olympic (O.P.)	5	(1)
1998–2006	Iraq	63	(25)

Managerial career
- 2013–2014: Al-Quwa Al-Jawiya (Assist.)
- 2015: Al-Minaa (Assist.)
- 2015–2016: Al-Quwa Al-Jawiya (Assist.)
- 2017–2018: Al-Quwa Al-Jawiya (Assist.)
- 2018–2019: Diwaniya
- 2020–2021: Naft Maysan
- 2021: Al-Karkh SC
- 2022: Iraq (Assist.)
- * Club domestic league appearances and goals as of 7 May 2008

Razzaq Farhan Mussa (Arabic: رَزَّاق فَرْحَان مُوسَى; born 1 July 1974) is a former Iraqi footballer and Olympic athlete who is currently the assistant manager of the Iraq national football team.

Razzaq Farhan is a top goalscorer, whose response time and action makes up for his size and power. The Al-Quwa Al-Jawiya forward scored 25 goals in 63 games for the Iraqi national team after making his debut against Lebanon.

Farhan has played for several professional clubs, including Qatar Sports Club and Al-Faisaly (Amman). He was also part of the Olympic team in the 2004 Olympic Games, and scored the only goal in a losing semifinal match against Paraguay.

== International goals ==
Scores and results list Iraq's goal tally first.

#	Date	Venue	Opponent	Score	Result	Competition
1	17 November 1998	National Stadium, Beirut	Lebanon	1–0	2–0	Friendly
2	30 June 1999	King Abdullah Stadium, Amman	Jordan	1–1	1–1	Friendly
3	5 August 1999	Central Stadium, Dushanbe	Oman	1–0	2–0	2000 AFC Asian Cup qualification
4	5 August 1999	Central Stadium, Dushanbe	Oman	2–0	2–0	2000 AFC Asian Cup qualification
5	7 August 1999	Central Stadium, Dushanbe	Kyrgyzstan	1–1	5–1	2000 AFC Asian Cup qualification
6	23 August 1999	Al Hassan Stadium, Amman	Oman	2–0	3–0	1999 Pan Arab Games
7	31 August 1999	Amman International Stadium, Amman	Jordan	4–4	4–4	1999 Pan Arab Games
8	27 May 2000	King Abdullah Stadium, Amman	Kyrgyzstan	1–0	4–0	2000 WAFF Championship
9	27 May 2000	King Abdullah Stadium, Amman	Kyrgyzstan	2–0	4–0	2000 WAFF Championship
10	27 May 2000	King Abdullah Stadium, Amman	Kyrgyzstan	4–0	4–0	2000 WAFF Championship
11	2 June 2000	King Abdullah Stadium, Amman	Jordan	1–0	4–1	2000 WAFF Championship
12	2 June 2000	King Abdullah Stadium, Amman	Jordan	4–1	4–1	2000 WAFF Championship
13	19 July 2002	Al-Shaab Stadium, Baghdad	Syria	1–0	2–0	Friendly
14	22 July 2002	Al-Shaab Stadium, Baghdad	Syria	2–0	2–1	Friendly
15	1 September 2002	Al Abbassiyyine Stadium, Damascus	Palestine	2–0	2–0	2002 WAFF Championship
16	7 September 2002	Al Abbassiyyine Stadium, Damascus	Jordan	1–2	3–2	2002 WAFF Championship
17	31 March 2004	Al-Wakrah Stadium, Doha	Palestine	1–0	1–1	2006 FIFA World Cup qualification
18	9 June 2004	Amman International Stadium, Amman	Chinese Taipei	1–0	6–1	2006 FIFA World Cup qualification
19	9 June 2004	Amman International Stadium, Amman	Chinese Taipei	2–0	6–1	2006 FIFA World Cup qualification
20	22 July 2004	Sichuan Stadium, Chengdu	Turkmenistan	2–1	3–2	2004 AFC Asian Cup
21	10 December 2004	Grand Hamad Stadium, Doha	Oman	1–3	1–3	17th Arabian Gulf Cup
22	13 December 2004	Grand Hamad Stadium, Doha	Qatar	1–0	3–3	17th Arabian Gulf Cup
23	1 December 2005	Ahmed bin Ali Stadium, Al Rayyan	Palestine	1–0	4–0	2005 West Asian Games
24	8 December 2005	Ahmed bin Ali Stadium, Al Rayyan	Saudi Arabia	2–0	2–0	2005 West Asian Games
25	10 December 2005	Ahmed bin Ali Stadium, Al Rayyan	Syria	1–1	2–2	2005 West Asian Games

== Coaching career ==
=== Al-Diwaniya FC ===
Farhan began his coaching career as an assistant to Radhi Shenaishil in Al-Quwa Al-Jawiya club, he worked in the club for almost 2 years. Farhan then went on his first coaching career with Al-Diwaniya FC which started in December 2018. Farhan had a good season compared to the club's bad supplies, In 30 games the club lost 7 games and won 8. Farhan had very impressive scores in some games like drawing with Al-Zawraa SC 3-3, then winning 3–2 in second round. Also winning Al-Talaba SC 2–0, winning 5th place Naft Maysan FC 3–1, and winning 6th place Al-Karkh SC 1–0. Very good home advantage for Farhan which was a reason in renewing the contract for the next season.

== Managerial statistics ==
As of match played 4 November 2021

Managerial record by team and tenure
Team	From	To	Record					Ref.
Team	From	To	P	W	D	L	Win %	Ref.
Al-Diwaniya	14 December 2018	26 August 2019	30	8	15	7	26.7	
Naft Maysan	7 August 2020	5 March 2021	31	12	12	7	38.7	
Al-Karkh SC	27 July 2021	4 November 2021	8	0	5	3	0.0	
Total			69	20	32	17	29.0	—

== Honours ==
=== Club ===
- Iraqi Premier League
  - Winner 1
    - 1996/97 with Al-Quwa Al-Jawiya
- Iraq FA Cup
  - Winner 1
    - 1996/97 with Al-Quwa Al-Jawiya
- Baghdad Championship
  - Winner 2
    - 1996/97 and 1998/99 with Al-Quwa Al-Jawiya
- Iraqi Super Cup
  - Winner 1
    - 1997 with Al-Quwa Al-Jawiya
- Bahraini Crown Prince Cup
  - Winner 1
    - 2005 with Riffa S.C.
- Jordan FA Cup
  - Winner 1
    - 2008 with Al-Faisaly SC (Amman)
- UAE President's Cup
  - Winner 1
    - 2003 with Al-Sharjah SCC

=== Country ===
- 2002 WAFF Champions
- 4th place in 2004 Athens Olympics
- 2005 West Asian Games Gold medallist.

Sporting positions
Preceded by Hussam Fawzi	Iraq captain 2004–2006	Succeeded by Younis Mahmoud
