= Riyadh Mezher =

Iraqi footballer

Personal information
- Full name: Riyadh Mezher Kharbit
- Position: Midfielder

International career
| Years | Team | Apps | (Gls) |
| 1999–2002 | Iraq | | |

Riyadh Mezher is a former Iraqi football midfielder who played for Iraq in the 1999 Pan Arab Games. He played for Iraq between 1999 and 2002.
