= Ali Wahaib Shnaiyn =

Iraqi footballer

Personal information
- Date of birth: 24 December 1975 (age 50)
- Place of birth: Baghdad, Iraq
- Position: Midfielder

Team information
- Current team: Al-Kahraba

Senior career*
Years	Team	Apps	(Gls)
1993–1996	Talaba		
1996–1997	Al-Taawun		
1998	Sportul Studenţesc	0	(0)
1998	Oţelul Galaţi	1	(0)
1998	Petrolul Ploieşti	0	(0)
1998–1999	Al-Arabi		
1999–2001	Talaba		
2001–2003	Arbil		
2003	Al-Shorta		
2003–2004	Al-Arabi		
2004–2005	Arbil		
2005–2006	Al-Naft		
2006–2010	Al-Kahraba		

International career
2000–2003	Iraq	14	(1)
- * Club domestic league appearances and goals as of 20:40, 3 November 2010 (UTC)

Ali Wahaib Shnaiyn (Arabic: عَلِيّ وَهِيب شَنِين; born 24 December 1975) is a former Iraqi international footballer.

== Career ==
=== Club football ===
Born in Baghdad, Shnaiyn turned professional in 1993 and has played club football in Iraq with Talaba, Arbil, Al-Shorta, Al-Naft and Al-Kahraba; in Qatar for Al-Taawun; in Romania for Sportul Studenţesc, Oţelul Galaţi and Petrolul Ploieşti; and in the United Arab Emirates for Al-Arabi.

During his time in Romania, Shnaiyn appeared in five friendly games, three youth matches, one Divizia A game, and one Cupa Ligii game.

== International career ==
Between 2000 and 2003, Shnaiyn scored one goal in fourteen appearances for the Iraqi national team.

=== International goals ===
Scores and results list Iraq's goal tally first.

No	Date	Venue	Opponent	Score	Result	Competition
1.	1 September 2002	Al Abbassiyyine Stadium, Damascus	Palestine	1–0	2–0	2002 WAFF
