= Ahmed Daham =

Iraqi footballer (1967–2021)

Ahmed Daham Karim
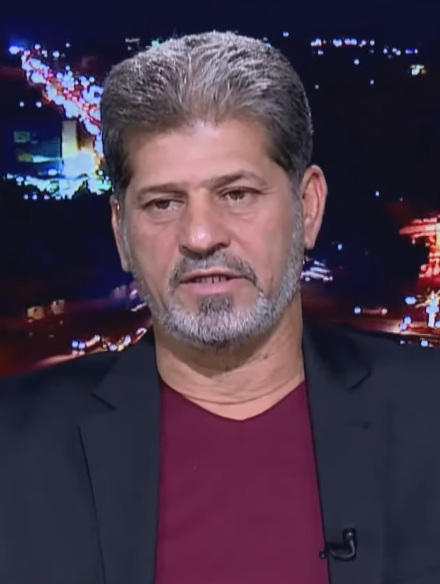
- Daham on AlTaghierTV in 2021

Personal information
- Date of birth: 12 October 1967
- Place of birth: Iraq
- Date of death: 29 December 2021 (aged 54)
- Position: Midfielder

Senior career*
Years	Team	Apps	(Gls)
- Amanat Baghdad
- Al-Jaish SC
- Al-Rasheed SC
- Al-Naft SC
- Al-Karkh SC
- Al-Talaba SC
- Al-Quwa Al-Jawiya

International career
1987–1996	Iraq		

Managerial career
- 2015–2016: Naft Maysan
- 2016: Al-Quwa Al-Jawiya (assistant)
- 2016: Al-Quwa Al-Jawiya
- 2016: Al-Baqa'a Club
- 2016–2017: Al-Karkh SC
- 2018: Karbalaa FC
- 2018–2020: Naft Maysan
- 2020: Al-Nasiriya FC
- 2020: Al-Ramadi
- 2021: Masafi Al-Wasat
- * Club domestic league appearances and goals

Ahmed Daham Karim (Arabic: أَحْمَد دَحَّام كَرِيم; 12 October 1967 – 29 December 2021) was an Iraqi football manager and player who played as a midfielder. He represented the Iraq national team in the 1996 Asian Cup.

== Coaching career ==
Daham signed for the Naft Maysan in August of the 2018–19 season, after Uday Ismail left. He led the team through good results and a very good season. He achieved fifth place in the league, six points behind third place. In the Iraqi Cup, the team went through the quarter final and was knocked out by Al-Talaba SC. Daham reached agreement with the board to stay for another season after long negotiations.

== Personal life and death ==
Daham died from a heart attack on 29 December 2021, at the age of 54.

== Career statistics ==
Scores and results list Iraq's goal tally first, score column indicates score after each Daham goal.

List of international goals scored by Ahmed Daham
No.	Date	Venue	Opponent	Score	Result	Competition
1	18 June 1993	Chengdu Sports Centre, Chengdu	Pakistan	1–0	4–0	1994 FIFA World Cup qualification

== Managerial statistics ==
As of match played 8 November 2020

Managerial record by team and tenure
Team	From	To	Record					
Team	From	To	P	W	D	L	Win %	
Naft Maysan	8 November 2015	3 March 2016	10	4	4	2	40.0	
Al-Quwa Al-Jawiya	18 May 2016	2 July 2016	3	3	0	0	100.0	
Al-Baqa'a	27 July 2016	24 September 2016	5	1	2	2	20.0	
Al-Karkh	5 December 2016	9 January 2017	6	1	1	4	16.7	
Karbalaa	11 July 2018	17 July 2018	2	1	0	1	50.0	
Naft Maysan	7 August 2018	28 July 2020	63	21	21	21	33.3	
Al-Nasiriya FC	7 September 2020	8 November 2020	0	0	0	0	—	
Al-Ramadi FC	8 November 2020	""Present""	0	0	0	0	—	
Total			89	31	28	30	34.8	—

== Honours ==
=== Manager ===
Al-Quwa Al-Jawiya

- Iraq FA Cup: 2015–16
