= Khalil Allawi =

Iraqi football defender

Khalil Mohammed Allawi
Personal information
- Full name: Khalil Mohammed Allawi
- Date of birth: 6 September 1958 (age 68)
- Place of birth: Iraq
- Height: 1.78 m (5 ft 10 in)
- Position: Defender

Senior career*
Years	Team	Apps	(Gls)
1976–1978	Al-Amana		
1978–1984	Al Quwa Al Jawiya		
1984–1987	Al Rasheed		
1987–1988	Al Shorta		
1988–1989	Al-Shabab		
1989–1990	Al Quwa Al Jawiya		
1990–1991	Al Karkh		
1991–1995	Al-Khutoot		

International career
1981–1989	Iraq	65	(5)
- * Club domestic league appearances and goals

Khalil Mohammed Allawi (born 6 September 1958) is an Iraqi football defender who played for Iraq in the 1986 FIFA World Cup. He also played for Al-Rasheed Club.

== Career statistics ==
=== International goals ===
Scores and results list Iraq's goal tally first.

No	Date	Venue	Opponent	Score	Result	Competition
1.	19 April 1985	Al-Sadaqua Walsalam Stadium, Kuwait City	Jordan	2–0	2–0	1986 FIFA World Cup qualification
2.	29 November 1985	King Fahd Stadium, Taif	Syria	3–1	3–1	1986 FIFA World Cup qualification
