= Sadiq Saadoun =

Iraqi footballer (born 1972)

Personal information
- Full name: Sadiq Saadoun Abdul-Ridha
- Date of birth: 12 June 1972 (age 54)
- Place of birth: Iraq
- Height: 1.85 m (6 ft 1 in)
- Position: Defender

Youth career
- 1988–1989: Al-Quwa Al-Jawiya

Senior career*
Years	Team	Apps	(Gls)
1989–1990	Al-Quwa Al-Jawiya		
1990–1991	Al-Khutoot		
1991–1993	Salahaddin		
1993–1996	Al-Quwa Al-Jawiya		
1996	Anyang LG Cheetahs	13	(1)
1996–1998	Al-Quwa Al-Jawiya		
1997–1998	→Al-Shorta (loan)		
1998–1999	Al-Talaba		
1999–2000	Akhaa Ahli Aley		
2000–2005	Al-Talaba		

International career
1995–2001	Iraq	8	(1)

Managerial career
- 2018: Al-Talaba
- 2018–2019: Al-Talaba (Assist. Coach)
- 2019: Al-Hussein
- 2019: Al-Diwaniya
- 2021: Al-Quwa Al-Jawiya (Assist. Coach)
- * Club domestic league appearances and goals

Sadiq Saadoun Abdul-Ridha (Arabic: صَادِق سَعْدُون عَبْد الرِّضَا; born 12 June 1972) is an Iraqi former footballer who played as a defender.

At club level, he has played for Anyang LG Cheetahs in South Korea and Al-Talaba SC in Iraq. Internationally Saadoun represented Iraq in the 2000 Asian Cup. He missed the 1996 Asian Cup in the United Arab Emirates, but was recalled by Milan Zivadinovic for the 2000 Asian Cup in Lebanon. He also scored 4 goals in the 1997 edition of the friendly international tournament Nehru Cup, which was won by Iraq.

== Career statistics ==
=== International ===
Scores and results list Iraq's goal tally first.

No	Date	Venue	Opponent	Score	Result	Competition
1.	6 June 1997	Al-Shaab Stadium, Baghdad	Kazakhstan	1–0	1–2	1998 FIFA World Cup qualification

== Managerial career ==
Saadoun has managed many teams, Al-Talaba (Iraq), Al-Hussein (Iraq), and is coaching Al-Diwaniya (Iraq) now.

=== Al-Diwaniya ===
Saadoun signed for Al-Diwaniya in August of the 2019-2020 season, after the leave of Razzaq Farhan.

== Managerial statistics ==
As of match played 6 November 2021

Managerial record by team and tenure
Team	From	To	Record					Ref.
Team	From	To	P	W	D	L	Win %	Ref.
Al-Talaba	22 April 2018	18 July 2018	15	4	5	6	26.7	
Al-Hussein	11 May 2019	23 July 2019	12	1	4	7	8.3	
Al-Diwaniya	31 August 2019	22 October 2019	10	4	1	5	40.0	
Total			37	9	10	18	24.3	—
