= Wamidh Munir =

Iraqi footballer

Personal information
- Full name: Wamidh Munir Yacoub
- Date of birth: 8 August 1961 (age 65)
- Place of birth: Iraq
- Position: Forward

Team information
- Current team: Muaither U-20 coach

Youth career
- 1978–1980: Al-Talaba

Senior career*
Years	Team	Apps	(Gls)
1980−1991	Al-Talaba		

International career
1982−1983	Iraq U20	?	(2)
1984	Iraq U23	8	(2)
1984−1986	Iraq	22	(4)

Managerial career
- 1993–1994: Al-Sinaa
- 1997–1998: Al Sailiya
- 2009–2010: Muaither
- 2015–: Muaither youth
- * Club domestic league appearances and goals

Wamidh Munir (Arabic: وميض منير) born in 1961 is an Iraqi football coach and former footballer. He played as a forward. He competed in the men's tournament at the 1984 Summer Olympics.

== International goals ==
Iraq national football team goals
Scores and results list Iraq's goal tally first.

#	Date	Venue	Opponent	Score	Result	Competition
1.	29 March 1985	King Abdullah II Stadium, Amman, Jordan	Jordan	1–0	3–2	1986 FIFA World Cup qualification

== Honours ==
=== Club ===
Al-Talaba

- Iraqi Premier League winners (3): 1980–81, 1981–82, 1985–86

=== International ===
- Palestine Cup of Nations for Youth: 1983 with Iraq U20
- Merlion Cup: 1984 with Iraq
