= Natiq Hashim =

Iraqi footballer (1960–2004)

Personal information
- Full name: Natiq Hashim Abid-Aoun
- Date of birth: 15 January 1960
- Place of birth: Baghdad, Iraq
- Date of death: 26 September 2004 (aged 44)
- Place of death: Muscat, Oman
- Height: 1.86 m (6 ft 1 in)
- Position: Midfielder

Senior career*
Years	Team	Apps	(Gls)
1978–1982	Al-Amana		
1982–1983	Al-Quwa Al-Jawiya		
1983–1984	Al-Jaish		
1984–1986	Al-Rasheed		
1986–1991	Al-Quwa Al-Jawiya		
1991–1992	Al-Khutoot		
1992–1995	Al-Quwa Al-Jawiya		

International career
1981–1990	Iraq	97	(12)

Managerial career
- 1995–1996: Al-Quwa Al-Jawiya
- 2001: Al-Quwa Al-Jawiya
- * Club domestic league appearances and goals

Natiq Hashim Abid-Aoun (15 January 1960 – 26 September 2004) was an Iraqi football midfielder who played for Iraq in the 1986 FIFA World Cup. He also played for Al-Quwa Al-Jawiya.

Natiq started his career at Amana youth team in Baghdad alongside the likes of Basim Qasim, Anad Abid, Basil Gorgis and Karim Allawi.

In 1982, Natiq was given his international debut by Yugoslavian coach Vojo Gardesevic after his displays for both the Iraqi youth team and Amana. A year later he joined Al-Quwa Al-Jawiya then Al-Jaish before moving to Al-Rasheed, who had many internationals in their side such as Ahmed Radhi, Adnan Dirjal and Haris Mohammed.

He participated at the 1984 Olympics in Los Angeles, against Canada, Cameroon and Yugoslavia and the 1988 Olympics in Seoul, where he played one game against Zambia. Natiq also played in all the 1986 World Cup games in Mexico in central midfield alongside his former Amana teammates Basil Gorgis, Anad Abid and Basim Qasim.

He died of a heart attack in 2004 in Muscat, where he was coaching a first division club.

== Career statistics ==
=== International goals ===
Scores and results list Iraq's goal tally first.

No	Date	Venue	Opponent	Score	Result	Competition
1.	8 February 1981	King Abdullah Stadium, Amman	Jordan	2–0	2–0	Friendly
2.	20 November 1982	Jawaharlal Nehru Stadium, New Delhi	Burma	1–0	4–0	1982 Asian Games
3.	20 March 1984	Royal Oman Police Stadium, Muscat	Bahrain	1–0	1–0	7th Arabian Gulf Cup
4.	1 May 1987	Zayed Sports City Stadium, Abu Dhabi	United Arab Emirates	1–0	3–0	1988 Olympics qualification
5.	11 December 1987	Grand Hamad Stadium, Doha	Qatar	3–1	3–1	1988 Olympics qualification
6.	27 January 1989	Al-Shaab Stadium, Baghdad	Oman	3–1	3–1	1990 FIFA World Cup qualification
7.	15 October 1989	Al-Sadaqua Walsalam Stadium, Kuwait City	Kuwait	1–0	1–0	1989 Peace and Friendship Cup
