= Karim Allawi =

Iraqi footballer (born 1960)

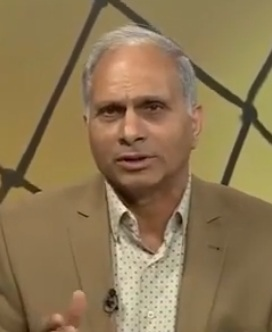

Personal information
- Full name: Karim Mohammed Allawi
- Date of birth: 1 April 1960 (age 66)
- Place of birth: Iraq
- Position: Right-back

Senior career*
Years	Team	Apps	(Gls)
1977–1984	Al-Amana		
1984–1987	Al Rasheed		
1987–1988	Abahani Krira Chakra		
1988–1990	Al Rasheed		
1990–1993	Al-Karkh SC		
1993–1995	Al-Quwa Al-Jawiya		
Total		313	(52)

International career
1981–1990	Iraq	91	(11)
- * Club domestic league appearances and goals

Karim Mohammed Allawi (born 1 April 1960) is an Iraqi football midfielder who played for Iraq in the 1986 FIFA World Cup. He also played for Al-Rasheed Club.

== Career statistics ==
=== International goals ===
Scores and results list Iraq's goal tally first.

No	Date	Venue	Opponent	Score	Result	Competition
1.	5 May 1985	Yuva Bharati Krirangan, Calcutta	Qatar	2–1	2–1	1986 FIFA World Cup qualification
2.	21 September 1986	Daegu Stadium, Daegu	Oman	1–0	4–0	1986 Asian Games
3.	21 September 1986	Daegu Stadium, Daegu	Oman	3–0	4–0	1986 Asian Games
4.	17 September 1988	Daejeon Hanbat Stadium, Daejeon	Zambia	2–2	2–2	1988 Summer Olympics
