= Basil Gorgis =

Iraqi footballer

Personal information
- Full name: Basil Gorgis Hanna
- Date of birth: 15 January 1961 (age 65)
- Place of birth: Ankawa, Iraq
- Height: 1.86 m (6 ft 1 in)
- Position: Midfielder

Senior career*
Years	Team	Apps	(Gls)
1977–1979	Al Saadoon		
1979–1982	Al-Amana		
1982–1990	Al Shabab		
1990–1991	Al Talaba		
1995	North York Astros		

International career
1982–1989	Iraq	49	(4)
- * Club domestic league appearances and goals

Basil Gewargis Hanna or Basil Korkis (Arabic: باسل كوركيس) (born 8 January 1961) is a former Iraqi international football player of Assyrian descent. Despite having a short career, he is considered to be one of the best players of all time in Iraq, being known for his tenacity and attacking threat.

As a player, Basil took the national team to uncharted territory, where he was part of the Iraqi "golden team" of the 1980s that included Hussein Saeed and Ahmad Radhi.

Basil is married and they have three daughters together.

== Club career ==
Like all up and coming Iraqi players, "It all started in the streets" as Basil was once quoted. As a teenager, he played with the youth league team Homentmen, a youth club belonging to Nadi Al-Armeni (Armenian Club). At the age of 16, he moved on to the club of Tammuz, a Junior team belonging to Nadi Al-Athori, where he caught the eye of the then first division Al-Amana coach Mustufa Auda. Throughout his youth, Basil points to Zia Isaac as the one who coached him into the player he would become. Basil remained in the Iraq Super League for all his career, where he went on to play for Al Shabab and Al Talaba.

He emigrated to Canada, where he played as an amateur with Nineveh Star from 1992. In 1995, he joined semi-professional club Scarborough Astros of the Canadian National Soccer League, helping them to the Ontario Cup Final losing on penalties to St.Catharines Roma Wolves.

== International goals ==
Scores and results list Iraq's goal tally first.

No	Date	Venue	Opponent	Score	Result	Competition
1.	16 August 1985	Moulay Abdellah Stadium, Rabat	Morocco	1–0	1–0	1985 Pan Arab Games
2.	16 March 1988	King Fahd International Stadium, Riyadh	Saudi Arabia	2–0	2–0	9th Arabian Gulf Cup
3.	21 July 1988	Amman International Stadium, Amman	Syria	1–1	1–1	1988 Arab Nations Cup
