= List of Iraq Stars League top scorers =

Iraq Stars League Top Scorer
- Awarded for: The leading goalscorer in a given Iraq Stars League season.
- Country: Iraq
- Presented by: Iraqi Pro League Association
- First award: 1975
- Currently held by: Sherzod Temirov (UZB)

Highlights
- Most awards: Karim Saddam (IRQ) (4)

The following is the list of Iraq Stars League top scorers by season from 1974–75. The latest top scorer is Sherzod Temirov of Erbil, who scored 28 goals in 2025–26.

Younis Abid Ali holds the record for most goals in a single season at 36, while Zahrawi Jaber scored the fewest goals in a season for a league top scorer at six. Thirteen players were top scorers in more than one season: Thamer Yousif, Ali Hussein Mahmoud, Hussein Saeed, Ahmed Radhi, Rahim Hameed, Karim Saddam, Hashim Ridha, Ahmed Salah, Amjad Radhi, Hammadi Ahmed, Alaa Abdul-Zahra, Mohannad Abdul-Raheem and Aymen Hussein. Rahim Hameed became the first player to become the league's top scorer three times in a row, in 1985–86, 1986–87 and 1987–88. Karim Saddam is the most successful player by winning the top scorer award four times, in 1988–89, 1989–90, 1990–91 and 1992–93. Syrian player Mahmoud Al-Mawas became the first non-Iraqi player to win the top scorer award in 2021–22.

Amjad Radhi is the all-time top scorer of the Iraq Stars League with a total of 180 goals.

== Winners ==
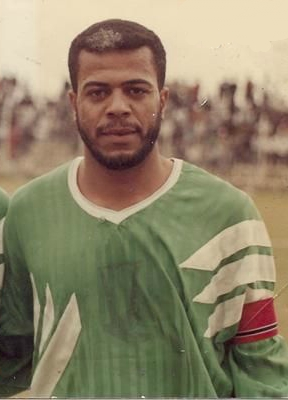
Younis Abid Ali holds the record for most goals scored in a single season (36 goals, in 1993–94).

Key
Player (X)	Name of the player and number of times they had won the award at that point (if more than one)
§	Denotes the club were Stars League champions in the same season

Year	Player	Goals	Club	Nationality	Ref.
1974–75	Thamer Yousif	12	Al-Naqil	Iraq	
1975–76	Thamer Yousif (2)	13	Al-Zawraa^{§}	Iraq	
1976–77	Zahrawi Jaber	6	Al-Shorta	Iraq	
1977–78	Jalil Hanoon	11	Al-Minaa^{§}	Iraq	
1978–79	Falah Hassan	7	Al-Zawraa^{§}	Iraq	
1979–80	Ali Hussein Mahmoud	18	Al-Shorta^{§}	Iraq	
1980–81	Hussein Saeed	11	Al-Talaba^{§}	Iraq	
1981–82	Thamer Yousif (3)	14	Al-Zawraa	Iraq	
1982–83	Hussein Saeed (2)	17	Al-Talaba	Iraq	
1983–84	Ali Hussein Mahmoud (2)	13	Al-Jaish^{§}	Iraq	
1984–85	Cancelled due to FIFA World Cup qualification				
1985–86	Ahmed Radhi	9	Al-Rasheed	Iraq	
1985–86	Hussein Saeed (3)	9	Al-Talaba^{§}	Iraq	
1985–86	Rahim Hameed	9	Al-Jaish	Iraq	
1986–87	Rahim Hameed (2)	14	Al-Jaish	Iraq	
1987–88	Rahim Hameed (3)	15	Al-Jaish	Iraq	
1988–89	Karim Saddam	22	Al-Zawraa	Iraq	
1989–90	Majeed Abdul-Ridha	13	Al-Shabab	Iraq	
1989–90	Karim Saddam (2)	13	Al-Zawraa	Iraq	
1990–91	Karim Saddam (3)	20	Al-Zawraa^{§}	Iraq	
1991–92	Ahmed Radhi (2)	34	Al-Zawraa	Iraq	
1992–93	Karim Saddam (4)	33	Al-Zawraa	Iraq	
1993–94	Younis Abid Ali	36	Al-Shorta	Iraq	
1994–95	Muayad Judi	30	Al-Karkh	Iraq	
1995–96	Hussam Fawzi	11	Al-Zawraa^{§}	Iraq	
1995–96	Ali Hassan	11	Al-Karkh	Iraq	
1996–97	Ali Hashim	19	Al-Najaf	Iraq	
1997–98	Mahmoud Majeed	22	Al-Shorta^{§}	Iraq	
1998–99	Ahmed Khudhair	19	Al-Quwa Al-Jawiya	Iraq	
1998–99	Hashim Ridha	19	Al-Shorta	Iraq	
1999–2000	Haidar Ayed	28	Al-Nasiriya	Iraq	
2000–01	Hussein Abdullah	21	Duhok	Iraq	
2001–02	Hashim Ridha (2)	32	Al-Shorta	Iraq	
2002–03	Cancelled due to the Iraq War				
2003–04	Cancelled due to scheduling and security issues				
2004–05	Mustafa Karim	16	Al-Kahrabaa	Iraq	
2005–06	Sahib Abbas	17	Karbala	Iraq	
2006–07	Ahmed Salah	11	Erbil^{§}	Iraq	
2007–08	Asaad Abdul-Nabi	14	Al-Kahrabaa	Iraq	
2008–09	Ahmed Salah (2)	15	Erbil^{§}	Iraq	
2009–10	Amjad Radhi	31	Al-Quwa Al-Jawiya	Iraq	
2010–11	Luay Salah	17	Erbil	Iraq	
2011–12	Hammadi Ahmed	27	Al-Quwa Al-Jawiya	Iraq	
2012–13	Amjad Radhi (2)	25	Erbil	Iraq	
2013–14	Ali Salah	14	Al-Talaba	Iraq	
2014–15	Marwan Hussein	15	Al-Shorta	Iraq	
2015–16	Hammadi Ahmed (2)	12	Al-Quwa Al-Jawiya	Iraq	
2015–16	Mohannad Abdul-Raheem	12	Al-Zawraa^{§}	Iraq	
2016–17	Alaa Abdul-Zahra	23	Al-Zawraa	Iraq	
2017–18	Wissam Saadoun	24	Naft Maysan	Iraq	
2018–19	Alaa Abdul-Zahra (2)	28	Al-Shorta^{§}	Iraq	
2019–20	Cancelled due to the COVID-19 pandemic				
2020–21	Aymen Hussein	22	Al-Quwa Al-Jawiya^{§}	Iraq	
2021–22	Mahmoud Al-Mawas	22	Al-Shorta^{§}	Syria	
2022–23	Mohannad Abdul-Raheem (2)	18	Al-Quwa Al-Jawiya	Iraq	
2023–24	Aymen Hussein (2)	27	Al-Quwa Al-Jawiya	Iraq	
2024–25	Mohanad Ali	27	Al-Shorta^{§}	Iraq	
2025–26	Sherzod Temirov	28	Erbil	Uzbekistan	

== Awards won by player ==
The following table lists the number of awards won by players who have won at least two top scorer awards.

Players in bold are still active in the Iraq Stars League.

Awards	Player	Seasons
4	Karim Saddam	1988–89, 1989–90, 1990–91, 1992–93
3	Thamer Yousif	1974–75, 1975–76, 1981–82
3	Hussein Saeed	1980–81, 1982–83, 1985–86
3	Rahim Hameed	1985–86, 1986–87, 1987–88
2	Ali Hussein Mahmoud	1979–80, 1983–84
2	Ahmed Radhi	1985–86, 1991–92
2	Hashim Ridha	1998–99, 2001–02
2	Ahmed Salah	2006–07, 2008–09
2	Amjad Radhi	2009–10, 2012–13
2	Hammadi Ahmed	2011–12, 2015–16
2	**Alaa Abdul-Zahra**	2016–17, 2018–19
2	**Mohannad Abdul-Raheem**	2015–16, 2022–23
2	**Aymen Hussein**	2020–21, 2023–24

== Awards won by nationality ==
Country	Players	Total
Iraq	34	52
Syria	1	1
Uzbekistan	1	1

== Awards won by club ==
Club	Total	Players
Al-Zawraa	11	7
Al-Shorta	10	9
Al-Quwa Al-Jawiya	7	5
Erbil	5	4
Al-Jaish	4	2
Al-Talaba	4	2
Al-Kahrabaa	2	2
Al-Karkh	2	2
Al-Minaa	1	1
Al-Najaf	1	1
Al-Naqil	1	1
Al-Nasiriya	1	1
Al-Rasheed	1	1
Al-Shabab	1	1
Duhok	1	1
Karbala	1	1
Naft Maysan	1	1

== All-time scorers ==
As of 1 June 2026.

Rank	Player	Goals	First app	Last app	Club(s) (goals)
1	(Iraq) Amjad Radhi	**180** (Note: Goal against Karbala (16 August 2010; match abandoned) and goal against Erbil (26 October 2016; match result annulled) are not counted.)	2007	2024	Al-Quwa Al-Jawiya (97), Erbil (75), Al-Najaf (8)
2	(Iraq) Sahib Abbas	**177**	1988	2012	Salahaddin (42), Al-Zawraa (62), Al-Talaba (18), Karbala (50), Al-Sinaa (5)
3	(Iraq) **Alaa Abdul-Zahra**	**173**	2004	present	Al-Zawraa (54), Duhok (26), Al-Shorta (78), Al-Minaa (11), Al-Talaba (4)
4	(Iraq) Karim Saddam	**171**	1979	1996	Al-Sinaa (23), Al-Jaish (11), Al-Rasheed (4), Al-Zawraa (127), Al-Shorta (6)
5	(Iraq) Ali Hashim	**170**	1987	2004	Al-Najaf (149), Al-Karkh (21)
6	(Iraq) Hussein Abdullah	**167**	1991	2010	Al-Sinaa (32), Al-Naft (16), Diyala (40), Duhok (58), Erbil (14), Kirkuk (2), Pires (5)
7	(Iraq) Hammadi Ahmed	**162** (Note: Goal against Al-Kahrabaa (25 October 2014; match awarded 0–3) and goal against Erbil (26 October 2016; match result annulled) are not counted.)	2005	2023	Samarra (19), Al-Quwa Al-Jawiya (143)
8	(Iraq) Younis Abid Ali	**157**	1983	2000	Al-Shorta (135), Al-Rasheed (15), Al-Quwa Al-Jawiya (3), Al-Difaa Al-Jawi (4)
9	(Iraq) Ahmed Radhi	**146**	1981	1999	Al-Zawraa (103), Al-Rasheed (43)
10	(Iraq) Alaa Kadhim	**145**	1988	2007	Al-Sinaa (8), Al-Talaba (137)

Bold denotes players still playing in the Iraq Stars League.

== See also ==
- Soccer Iraq Goal of the Season
