= List of Iraqi football champions =

Iraqi League (1st tier)

Iraqi National First Division (1973–1974) Iraq Stars League (1974–present)
- Country
- Iraq
- Founded
- 1973
- Number of teams
- 20 (since 2014–15 season)
- Current champions
- Al-Quwa Al-Jawiya (2025–26)
- Most successful club
- Al-Zawraa (14 championships)

The Iraqi football champions are the winners of the highest league in Iraqi football. Following the establishment of the Iraq Football Association (IFA) in 1948, a regional league called the Iraq Central FA Premier League was held for teams from Baghdad and its neighbouring cities, alongside other regional leagues including the Basra, Kirkuk and Mosul leagues. These regional league championships lasted until 1973, when the IFA established the first nationwide football league in Iraq by the name of Iraqi National First Division League, which featured a mixture of clubs and institute teams.

After one season, a new clubs-only league competition was established, with many of the institute teams merging or being replaced by sports clubs. The first season saw Al-Tayaran (now known as Al-Quwa Al-Jawiya) achieving the league title. The four "Popular Teams" of Baghdad (Al-Zawraa, Al-Quwa Al-Jawiya, Al-Shorta and Al-Talaba), have dominated the now-called Iraq Stars League over the years. Al-Quwa Al-Jawiya and Al-Shorta have appeared in every season of the top-flight, while Al-Zawraa and Al-Talaba have also never been relegated.

Al-Zawraa have won 14 titles, the most of any club. Erbil are the only club outside of Baghdad to achieve more than one title, having won four titles, all in the 21st century.

== List of champions ==
Key to list of winners
†	Champions also won the Iraq FA Cup that season for a double
*	Champions also won the Iraq FA Cup and Arab Club Champions Cup that season for a treble
†	Champions also won the Iraq FA Cup and Baghdad Championship that season for a domestic treble
‡	Champions also won the Baghdad Championship that season
#	Champions also won the AFC Cup that season

=== 1973–1974: Iraqi National First Division ===
Season	Champions (number of titles)	Runners-up	Third place	Winning manager
1973–74	Al-Quwa Al-Jawiya	Aliyat Al-Shorta	Al-Minaa	(Iraq) Abdelilah Mohammed Hassan

=== 1974–present: Iraq Stars League ===
Season	Champions (number of titles)	Runners-up	Third place	Winning manager
1974–75	Al-Tayaran (Note: Al-Quwa Al-Jawiya were known as Al-Tayaran from 1974 until 1991.) (2)	Al-Naqil	Al-Muwasalat	(Iraq) Abdelilah Mohammed Hassan
1975–76	Al-Zawraa^{†}	Al-Tayaran	Al-Shorta	(Iraq) Saadi Salih
1976–77	Al-Zawraa (2)	Al-Jamiea	Al-Shorta	(Iraq) Saadi Salih
1977–78	Al-Minaa	Al-Zawraa	Al-Sinaa	(Iraq) Jamil Hanoon
1978–79	Al-Zawraa (3)^{†}	Al-Shorta	Al-Talaba	(Iraq) Anwar Jassam
1979–80	Al-Shorta	Al-Zawraa	Al-Talaba	(Iraq) Douglas Aziz
1980–81	Al-Talaba	Al-Shorta	Al-Tayaran	(Iraq) Ammo Baba
1981–82	Al-Talaba (2)	Al-Tayaran	Al-Sinaa	(Iraq) Jamal Salih
1982–83	Salahaddin	Al-Talaba	Al-Tayaran	(Iraq) Wathiq Naji
1983–84	Al-Jaish	Al-Talaba	Al-Tayaran	(Iraq) Munthir Al-Waadh
1984–85	Cancelled due to FIFA World Cup qualification			
1985–86	Al-Talaba (3)	Al-Rasheed	Al-Tayaran	(Iraq) Yahya Alwan
1986–87	Al-Rasheed^{*}	Al-Jaish	Al-Shabab	(Iraq) Nasrat Nassir
1987–88	Al-Rasheed (2)^{*}	Al-Jaish	Al-Tayaran	(Iraq) Jamal Salih
1988–89	Al-Rasheed (3)	Al-Talaba	Al-Tayaran	(Iraq) Jamal Salih
1989–90	Al-Tayaran (3)	Al-Rasheed	Al-Shorta	(Iraq) Amer Jameel
1990–91	Al-Zawraa (4)^{†}	Al-Talaba	Al-Shorta	(Iraq) Falah Hassan
1991–92	Al-Quwa Al-Jawiya (4)^{†}	Al-Zawraa	Al-Karkh	(Iraq) Adil Yousef
1992–93	Al-Talaba (4)^{‡}	Al-Zawraa	Al-Quwa Al-Jawiya	(Iraq) Ayoub Odisho
1993–94	Al-Zawraa (5)^{†}	Al-Quwa Al-Jawiya	Al-Talaba	(Iraq) Ammo Baba
1994–95	Al-Zawraa (6)^{†}	Al-Quwa Al-Jawiya	Al-Najaf	(Iraq) Hadi Mutanash
1995–96	Al-Zawraa (7)^{†}	Al-Najaf	Al-Shorta	(Iraq) Adnan Hamad
1996–97	Al-Quwa Al-Jawiya (5)^{†}	Al-Zawraa	Al-Talaba	(Iraq) Ayoub Odisho
1997–98	Al-Shorta (2)	Al-Quwa Al-Jawiya	Al-Zawraa	(Iraq) Abdelilah Abdul-Hameed
1998–99	Al-Zawraa (8)^{†}	Al-Talaba	Al-Quwa Al-Jawiya	(Iraq) Amer Jameel
1999–2000	Al-Zawraa (9)^{†}	Al-Quwa Al-Jawiya	Al-Shorta	(Iraq) Adnan Hamad
2000–01	Al-Zawraa (10)	Al-Quwa Al-Jawiya	Al-Shorta	(Iraq) Sabah Abdul-Jalil
2001–02	Al-Talaba (5)^{†}	Al-Quwa Al-Jawiya	Al-Shorta	(Iraq) Thair Ahmed
2002–03	Cancelled due to the Iraq War			
2003–04	Cancelled due to scheduling and security issues			
2004–05	Al-Quwa Al-Jawiya (6)	Al-Minaa	Al-Talaba	(Iraq) Sabah Abdul-Jalil
2005–06	Al-Zawraa (11)	Al-Najaf	Erbil	(Iraq) Salih Radhi
2006–07	Erbil	Al-Quwa Al-Jawiya	Al-Najaf	(Iraq) Akram Salman
2007–08	Erbil (2)	Al-Zawraa	Al-Quwa Al-Jawiya	(Iraq) Thair Ahmed
2008–09	Erbil (3)	Al-Najaf	Duhok	(Iraq) Thair Ahmed
2009–10	Duhok	Al-Talaba	Al-Zawraa	(Iraq) Basim Qasim
2010–11	Al-Zawraa (12)	Erbil	Al-Sinaa	(Iraq) Radhi Shenaishil
2011–12	Erbil (4)	Duhok	Al-Quwa Al-Jawiya	(Syria) Nizar Mahrous
2012–13	Al-Shorta (3)	Erbil	Al-Quwa Al-Jawiya	(Iraq) Thair Jassam
2013–14	Ended prematurely without awarding title			
2014–15	Naft Al-Wasat	Al-Quwa Al-Jawiya	Al-Shorta	(Iraq) Abdul-Ghani Shahad
2015–16	Al-Zawraa (13)	Naft Al-Wasat	Al-Talaba	(Iraq) Basim Qasim
2016–17	Al-Quwa Al-Jawiya (7)^{#}	Al-Naft	Al-Shorta	(Iraq) Basim Qasim
2017–18	Al-Zawraa (14)	Al-Quwa Al-Jawiya	Al-Naft	(Iraq) Ayoub Odisho
2018–19	Al-Shorta (4)	Al-Quwa Al-Jawiya	Al-Zawraa	(Montenegro) Nebojša Jovović
2019–20	Cancelled due to the COVID-19 pandemic			
2020–21	Al-Quwa Al-Jawiya (8)^{†}	Al-Zawraa	Al-Najaf	(Iraq) Ayoub Odisho
2021–22	Al-Shorta (5)	Al-Quwa Al-Jawiya	Al-Talaba	(Egypt) Moamen Soliman
2022–23	Al-Shorta (6)	Al-Quwa Al-Jawiya	Al-Zawraa	(Iraq) Ahmed Salah
2023–24	Al-Shorta (7)^{†}	Al-Quwa Al-Jawiya	Al-Zawraa	(Egypt) Moamen Soliman
2024–25	Al-Shorta (8)	Al-Zawraa	Zakho	(Egypt) Moamen Soliman
2025–26	Al-Quwa Al-Jawiya (9)	Al-Shorta	Erbil	(Oman) Rashid Jaber

== Total titles won ==
There are 11 clubs who have won the Iraqi title.

Teams in bold compete in the Stars League as of the 2024–25 season.

Rank	Club	Winners	Runners-up	Winning seasons
1	**Al-Zawraa**	14	8	1975–76, 1976–77, 1978–79, 1990–91, 1993–94, 1994–95, 1995–96, 1998–99, 1999–2000, 2000–01, 2005–06, 2010–11, 2015–16, 2017–18
2	**Al-Quwa Al-Jawiya**	9	15	1973–74, 1974–75, 1989–90, 1991–92, 1996–97, 2004–05, 2016–17, 2020–21, 2025–26
3	**Al-Shorta**	8	3	1979–80, 1997–98, 2012–13, 2018–19, 2021–22, 2022–23, 2023–24, 2024–25
4	**Al-Talaba**	5	7	1980–81, 1981–82, 1985–86, 1992–93, 2001–02
5	**Erbil**	4	2	2006–07, 2007–08, 2008–09, 2011–12
6	Al-Rasheed	3	2	1986–87, 1987–88, 1988–89
7	Al-Jaish	1	2	1983–84
7	**Al-Minaa**	1	1	1977–78
7	**Duhok**	1	1	2009–10
7	Naft Al-Wasat	1	1	2014–15
7	Salahaddin	1	0	1982–83

Titles won by club (%)
1. Al-Zawraa – 14 (29.1%)
2. Al-Quwa Al-Jawiya – 9 (18.8%)
3. Al-Shorta – 8 (16.7%)
4. Al-Talaba – 5 (10.4%)
5. Erbil – 4 (8.30%)
6. Al-Rasheed – 3 (6.30%)
7. Other clubs – 5 (10.4%)

=== By region ===
Region	Championships	Clubs
Baghdad	40	Al-Zawraa (14), Al-Quwa Al-Jawiya (9), Al-Shorta (8), Al-Talaba (5), Al-Rasheed (3), Al-Jaish (1)
Kurdistan	5	Erbil (4), Duhok (1)
South	1	Al-Minaa (1)
Central	1	Salahaddin (1)
Central Euphrates	1	Naft Al-Wasat (1)

=== By city ===
City / Town	Championships	Clubs
Baghdad	40	Al-Zawraa (14), Al-Quwa Al-Jawiya (9), Al-Shorta (8), Al-Talaba (5), Al-Rasheed (3), Al-Jaish (1)
Erbil	4	Erbil (4)
Basra	1	Al-Minaa (1)
Duhok	1	Duhok (1)
Najaf	1	Naft Al-Wasat (1)
Tikrit	1	Salahaddin (1)

== See also ==
- For Iraqi women's football champions, see Iraqi Women's Football League: List of champions
- Iraq Central FA Premier League
- Iraq FA Basra Premier League
- Iraq FA Kirkuk Premier League
- Iraqi National First Division
- Iraq Stars League
