= Football in Iraq =

- Country: Iraq
- Governing body: Iraq Football Association
- National team: men's national team

National competitions
- FIFA World Cup; AFC Asian Cup

Club competitions
- List: League: Iraq Stars League Iraqi Premier Division League Iraqi First Division League Iraqi Second Division League Iraqi Third Division League; Cups: Iraq FA Cup Iraqi Super Cup

International competitions
- AFC Champions League Elite; AFC Champions League Two; Arab Club Champions Cup; GFF Gulf Club Champions League

The sport of football in the country of Iraq is run by the Iraq Football Association. The association administers the national football team as well as the Iraqi football league system. Football is the most popular sport in Iraq. Approximately 35% of the people in Iraq are considered football fans.

== National teams ==
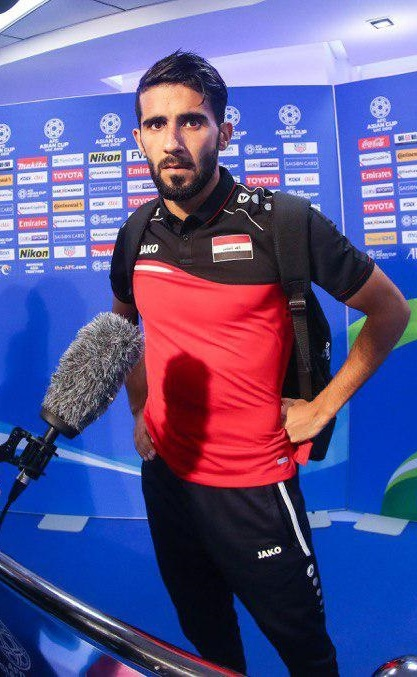
Bashar Resan with Iraq

The national team have qualified for the final tournament of the World Cup twice in 1986 and 2026. Success in the Asian Cup has been more widespread, winning the tournament in 2007 and finishing fourth in 1976 and 2015. As of 2015 the women's national team have not entered either of these competitions.

The under-23 side has had success at the Asian Games winning silver at the 2006 edition in Qatar and bronze in the 2014 tournament, held in South Korea. Their best placing in Olympic football has been fourth at Athens in 2004.

As of 18 July 2024 the men's team were ranked 55th in the world while the women's team are ranked 172nd

== Football stadiums in Iraq ==
The Ministry of Youth and Sports developed plans to drastically improve sports infrastructure and have decided to build big stadiums in every governorate of Iraq. The government gave them a $2.5bn package for this cause, and plans have been drawn up to build most of the stadiums below. They have also used some of this budget to improve football on a local level in areas of the country. Most stadiums listed below have been funded by this package, unless they are one of the older stadiums, or the proposed Baghdad Sports City, which will be funded by the Saudi king, King Salman.

#	Image	Stadium	Location	Current Capacity	Sport	Home team(s)	Year built	Coordinates	Ref.
1		Basra International Stadium	Basra	65,227	Football	Iraq national football team	2013	30°26′23.6″N 47°46′47.3″E	
2		Al-Shaab Stadium	Baghdad	35,700	Football	Al-Quwa Al-Jawiya, Al-Shorta SC, Al-Talaba SC	1966	33°19′29.53″N 44°26′07.09″E	
3		Al-Madina Stadium	Al Habibya, Baghdad	32,000	Football	Iraq national football team	2021	33°21′15.8″N 44°27′20.1″E	
4		Karbala International Stadium	Karbala	30,000	Football	Karbala SC	2016	32°33′53.4″N 44°00′15.4″E	
5		Al-Najaf International Stadium	Najaf	30,000	Football	Al-Najaf SC, Naft Al-Wasat SC	2018	32°03′58.7″N 44°19′01″E	
6		Al-Minaa Olympic Stadium	Basra	30,000	Football	Al-Minaa SC	2022	30°33′08.6″N 47°46′41.5″E	
7		Franso Hariri Stadium	Erbil	25,000	Football	Erbil SC	1956	36°10′21.1″N 44°00′42″E	
8		Kirkuk Olympic Stadium	Kirkuk	25,000	Football	Kirkuk SC	1982	35°26′35.4″N 44°25′16.7″E	
9		Maysan Stadium	Amarah	25,000	Football	Naft Maysan SC, Maysan SC	1987	31°50′07.2″N 47°07′37.1″E	
10		Duhok Stadium	Duhok	22,800	Football	Duhok SC	1986	36°51′06.9″N 42°59′47.1″E	
11		Zakho International Stadium	Zakho	20,000	Football	Zakho SC	2015	37°08′45.5″N 42°40′20″E	
12		Al-Kut Olympic Stadium	Al Kut	20,000	Football	Al-Kut SC	2018	32°30′08.6″N 45°50′06.2″E	
13		Sulaymaniyah Stadium	Sulaymaniyah	18,000	Football	Sulaymaniyah SC, Newroz SC		35°32′59.4″N 45°25′44.4″E	
14		Al-Zawraa Stadium	Baghdad	15,443	Football	Al-Zawraa SC	2022	33°20′39.2″N 44°22′05.5″E	
15		Al Ramadi Stadium	Ramadi	15,000	Football	Al-Ramadi SC, Al-Fahad SC		33°25′13.4″N 43°19′18.3″E	
16		Al-Samawah Stadium	Al Muthanna	15,000	Football	Al-Samawa SC, Uruk SC		31°19′58.9″N 45°17′20.2″E	
17		Al-Kashafa Stadium	Al Kasrah, Baghdad	14,000	Football		1931	33°21′34″N 44°22′49.5″E	
18		Al Fayhaa Stadium	Basra	10,000	Football	Naft Al-Basra SC, Al-Minaa SC	2013	30°26′33.3″N 47°46′47.3″E	
19		Al-Najaf old Stadium	Najaf	10,000	Football	Al-Najaf SC	1970	32°00′43.6″N 44°19′39.9″E	
20		Suq Al-Shuyukh Stadium	Dhi Qar	10,000	Football	Al-Furat SC, Suq Al-Shuyukh SC	2015	30°54′12.6″N 46°27′09.4″E	
21		Delal Stadium	Zakho	10,000	Football	Zakho SC		37°10′06.3″N 42°41′30.2″E	
22		Al Aziziyah Stadium	Wasit	10,000	Football	Al-Aziziyah SC	2019	32°50′41.7″N 45°08′09.3″E	
23		Al-Nasiriyah Stadium	Nasiriyah	10,000	Football	Al-Nasiriya SC, Akkad SC		31°01′17.8″N 46°15′04.7″E	
24		Ba'quba Stadium	Baqubah	10,000	Football	Diyala SC		33°44′53.1″N 44°39′27.1″E	
25		Tikrit Stadium	Tikrit	10,000	Football	Salahaddin SC, Tikrit SC		34°35′46.6″N 43°41′01.7″E	

== Club tournaments ==
Aliyat Al-Shorta reached the final of the Asian Club Championship, the biggest tournament in Asian football, in 1971 but withdrew from the final due to it being against an Israeli team. Al-Rasheed also reached the final in 1989 but lost on away goals. Al-Shorta won the first ever edition of the Arab Club Champions Cup in 1982 with Al-Rasheed winning that competition three times in a row (1985, 1986, 1987). Al-Talaba and Al-Zawraa both lost the final of the Asian Cup Winners' Cup in 1995 and 2000 respectively, and Erbil lost the final of Asia's second-tier tournament, the AFC Cup, twice in 2012 and 2014. Al-Quwa Al-Jawiya won the AFC Cup three consecutive times in 2016, 2017 and 2018, while Duhok won the 2024–25 edition of the GFF Gulf Club Champions League.

== Attendances ==
The 2024–25 Iraq Stars League clubs by average home league attendance:

No.	Club	Average attendance
1	Duhok SC	17,948
2	Zakho SC	16,247
3	Newroz SC	12,983
4	Erbil SC	12,609
5	Al-Zawraa SC	11,028
6	Al-Karma	10,905
7	Al-Najaf FC	7,983
8	Al-Shorta SC	7,712
9	Al-Mina'a SC	7,584
10	Karbala'a FC	4,463
11	Al-Quwa Al-Jawiya	4,352
12	Al-Qasim SC	2,508
13	Naft Missan	2,183
14	Al-Talaba SC	1,914
15	Diyala SC	1,449
16	Al-Kahrbaa Club	1,356
17	Al-Naft SC	936
18	Al-Hedod SC	758
19	Naft Al-Basra SC	435
20	Al-Karkh SC	400
League average		6,288

== See also ==
- Women's football in Iraq
- Iraq Football Association (IFA)
- Iraq national football team
- Iraqi football league system
- Iraq Stars League
- List of Iraqi football champions
