= 1986–87 Iraqi National League =

Iraqi National League
- Season: 1986–87
- Champions: Al-Rasheed (1st title)
- Asian Club Championship: Al-Rasheed
- Arab Club Champions Cup: Al-Rasheed; Al-Jaish
- Top goalscorer: Rahim Hameed (14 goals)

The 1986–87 Iraqi National Clubs First Division League was the 13th season of the competition since its foundation in 1974. Al-Rasheed won their first league title, and also won the 1986–87 Iraq FA Cup to complete the double. The league was played in a quadruple round-robin format for the only time in history.

== League table ==
Pos	Team	Pld	W	D	L	GF	GA	GD	Pts	Qualification
1	Al-Rasheed (C)	44	24	14	6	65	29	+36	62	Asian Club Championship qualifying round and Arab Club Champions Cup group stage
2	Al-Jaish	44	19	21	4	57	24	+33	59	Arab Club Champions Cup preliminary round (Note: As holders, Al-Rasheed automatically qualified for the Arab Club Champions Cup meaning Iraq were given another slot in the competition. This slot was given to Al-Jaish, runners-up of the league and the FA Cup (both won by Al-Rasheed).)
3	Al-Shabab	44	18	16	10	50	34	+16	52	
4	Al-Tayaran	44	16	19	9	47	41	+6	51	
5	Al-Shorta	44	15	19	10	40	32	+8	49	
6	Al-Talaba	44	15	15	14	34	34	0	45	
7	Al-Zawraa	44	12	20	12	38	35	+3	44	
8	Al-Bahri	44	10	17	17	37	48	−11	37	
9	Salahaddin	44	12	13	19	29	45	−16	37	
10	Al-Sinaa	44	8	19	17	33	47	−14	35	
11	Al-Naft	44	9	14	21	26	47	−21	32	
12	Al-Mosul	44	4	17	23	23	63	−40	25	

Source: Ali Al-Sabti Archive
(C) Champions

== Results ==
=== Rounds 1–22 ===
Home \ Away	BHR	JSH	MSL	NFT	RSH	SHB	SHR	SIN	TLB	TAY	ZWR	SAL
Al-Bahri		2–2	1–0	0–1	0–2	0–2	1–1	1–1	1–2	0–0	1–0	3–1
Al-Jaish	4–0		2–0	3–1	0–0	1–1	1–0	1–0	0–0	0–0	1–1	2–0
Al-Mosul	1–2	0–3		1–2	0–1	1–2	1–2	1–1	1–1	0–4	0–0	0–2
Al-Naft	1–0	0–1	2–0		0–4	0–1	1–0	0–0	0–1	0–2	1–0	1–2
Al-Rasheed	1–1	0–2	2–0	2–1		3–3	0–0	1–0	2–0	1–0	0–0	1–0
Al-Shabab	1–0	1–1	3–0	1–0	1–0		1–1	1–0	0–0	2–2	3–1	1–0
Al-Shorta	1–0	0–0	4–0	1–0	0–1	1–1		2–2	0–1	0–2	2–1	1–0
Al-Sinaa	1–1	1–3	0–1	1–1	0–4	2–1	0–0		1–0	2–2	1–2	0–1
Al-Talaba	0–0	1–4	1–0	1–1	0–1	1–0	0–1	1–0		1–3	0–0	3–1
Al-Tayaran	2–2	0–0	0–0	0–0	0–0	2–1	2–2	1–0	1–1		3–2	0–3 (Note: The Al-Tayaran–Salahaddin match was awarded as a 3–0 win to Salahaddin after the game had originally ended in a 0–0 draw.)
Al-Zawraa	1–0	0–0	1–1	1–1	1–2	1–1	1–1	0–0	1–1	2–1		2–0
Salahaddin	1–3	0–0	0–0	2–0	1–4	0–2	1–0	0–0	0–1	0–0	2–0	

Source: Ali Al-Sabti Archive
Legend: Blue = home team win; Yellow = draw; Red = away team win.

=== Rounds 23–44 ===
Home \ Away	BHR	JSH	MSL	NFT	RSH	SHB	SHR	SIN	TLB	TAY	ZWR	SAL
Al-Bahri		0–2	1–1	0–1	1–4	1–1	0–0	2–0	0–2	0–0	0–0	1–1
Al-Jaish	2–1		0–0	0–0	2–2	0–2	0–2	1–0	1–1	1–1	0–0	4–0
Al-Mosul	1–1	0–3		1–1	1–1	2–1	0–2	1–5	2–0	0–2	0–0	0–1
Al-Naft	1–0	0–3	2–1		1–1	2–2	0–1	1–1	0–1	1–2	0–0	1–2
Al-Rasheed	2–1	1–1	3–1	1–0		1–2	4–3	0–2	1–0	0–0	2–0	3–0
Al-Shabab	0–2	1–0	0–0	0–0	0–0		0–1	2–0	3–1	1–2	1–0	2–0
Al-Shorta	1–1	1–1	0–2	2–1	1–0	2–1		0–0	1–0	0–1	0–0	1–1
Al-Sinaa	0–2	0–0	1–1	1–0	0–4	2–1	0–0		1–2	0–0	1–1	0–1
Al-Talaba	1–1	1–2	2–0	0–0	1–1	1–0	0–0	0–0		2–0	0–1	0–1
Al-Tayaran	2–1	0–1	1–1	2–0	2–1	0–0	0–0	1–3	0–2		1–0	0–1
Al-Zawraa	0–1	1–0	0–0	2–0	0–1	0–0	3–2	1–1	1–0	7–2		1–0
Salahaddin	0–1	2–2	0–0	0–0	0–0	0–0	0–0	1–2	0–0	0–1	1–2	

Source: Ali Al-Sabti Archive
Legend: Blue = home team win; Yellow = draw; Red = away team win.

== Season statistics ==
=== Top scorers ===
Pos	Scorer	Goals	Team
1	Rahim Hameed	14	Al-Jaish
2	Ali Hussein Mahmoud	12	Al-Jaish
3	Karim Hadi	10	Al-Shabab
3	Hassan Saddawi	10	Al-Tayaran
3	Jassim Ibrahim	10	Al-Tayaran

=== Hat-tricks ===
Player	For	Against	Result
(Iraq) Jassim Ibrahim	Al-Tayaran	Al-Mosul	4–0
