= 1982–83 Iraqi National League =

Iraqi National League
- Season: 1982–83
- Champions: Salahaddin (1st title)
- Top goalscorer: Hussein Saeed (17 goals)

The 1982–83 Iraqi National Clubs First Division League was the 9th season of the competition since its foundation in 1974. Salahaddin won their first league title, finishing the season without defeat and clinching the title with a 1–1 draw against runners-up Al-Talaba on the final day of the season.

== League table ==
Pos	Team	Pld	W	D	L	GF	GA	GD	Pts	Qualification
1	Salahaddin	22	12	10	0	24	6	+18	34	League Champions
2	Al-Talaba	22	15	3	4	43	21	+22	33	
3	Al-Tayaran	22	11	7	4	26	16	+10	29	
4	Al-Sinaa	22	9	7	6	26	16	+10	25	
5	Al-Jaish	22	8	8	6	20	17	+3	24	FA Cup Winners
6	Al-Shorta	22	7	9	6	19	20	−1	23	
7	Al-Zawraa	22	5	10	7	23	24	−1	20	
8	Al-Shabab	22	7	5	10	17	25	−8	19	
9	Al-Mosul	22	5	8	9	17	29	−12	18	
10	Al-Amana	22	6	5	11	21	28	−7	17	
11	Al-Minaa	22	3	6	13	18	32	−14	12	
12	Al-Tijara	22	3	4	15	15	35	−20	10	

Source: Ali Al-Sabti Archive

== Results ==
Home \ Away	AMN	JSH	MIN	MSL	SHB	SHR	SIN	TLB	TAY	TJR	ZWR	SAL
Al-Amana		1–2	2–0	0–2	0–0	2–0	0–2	1–3	1–1	1–0	0–2	0–1
Al-Jaish	0–0		2–1	3–0	2–0	0–2	0–0	2–2	3–4	1–0	1–1	0–1
Al-Minaa	3–1	0–1		0–1	2–3	1–1	1–2	1–2	1–0	0–2	2–2	1–3
Al-Mosul	0–2	0–0	1–0		2–2	1–2	0–5	1–2	1–2	2–1	1–1	1–1
Al-Shabab	1–0	0–1	0–1	2–1		1–0	2–1	0–2	0–3	1–0	1–1	1–1
Al-Shorta	1–1	0–0	3–1	0–0	1–0		0–0	0–3	0–0	2–0	1–2	0–1
Al-Sinaa	1–0	1–0	1–1	1–1	1–2	3–0		2–0	0–1	0–0	0–0	1–2
Al-Talaba	3–2	0–1	2–1	3–0	1–0	1–2	5–1		2–1	2–0	1–3	0–0
Al-Tayaran	2–1	1–0	1–1	0–0	1–0	1–1	1–0	0–1		2–0	2–3	0–0
Al-Tijara	3–4	0–0	0–0	1–2	1–1	1–2	0–2	1–5	0–1		3–2	0–1
Al-Zawraa	0–1	1–1	0–0	0–0	1–0	1–1	0–2	1–2	1–2	1–2		0–0
Salahaddin	1–1	2–0	2–0	1–0	2–0	0–0	0–0	1–1	0–0	3–0	1–0	

Source: Ali Al-Sabti Archive
Legend: Blue = home team win; Yellow = draw; Red = away team win.

== Season statistics ==
=== Top scorers ===
Pos	Scorer	Goals	Team
1	Hussein Saeed	17	Al-Talaba
2	Rahim Hameed	9	Al-Talaba
3	Anad Abid	8	Salahaddin
3	Ahmed Radhi	8	Al-Zawraa

=== Hat-tricks ===
Player	For	Against	Result	Date
(Iraq) Rahim Hameed^{4}	Al-Talaba	Al-Tijara	5–1	14 May 1983

Notes

^{4} Player scored 4 goals
