= 1980–81 Iraqi National League =

Iraqi National League
- Season: 1980–81
- Champions: Al-Talaba (1st title)
- Relegated: Al-Adhamiya
- Top goalscorer: Hussein Saeed (11 goals)

The 1980–81 Iraqi National Clubs First Division League was the 7th season of the competition since its foundation in 1974. The competition was originally meant to be held in a double round-robin format, but was later changed to a single round-robin tournament due to the Iran–Iraq War. Al-Talaba won the league title for the first time in their history.

Al-Shorta defeated Al-Zawraa 3–0 on the final day of the season on 19 May to move level with Al-Talaba on both points and goal difference. The next tiebreaker was number of wins, and therefore Al-Talaba were crowned champions having won two more matches than Al-Shorta.

== League table ==
Pos	Team	Pld	W	D	L	GF	GA	GD	Pts	Qualification or relegation
1	Al-Talaba	11	8	1	2	19	5	+14	17 (Note: Al-Talaba ranked ahead of Al-Shorta by number of wins, due to equal points and goal difference.)	League Champions
2	Al-Shorta	11	6	5	0	21	7	+14	17	
3	Al-Tayaran	11	6	4	1	17	7	+10	16	
4	Al-Shabab	11	5	3	3	13	9	+4	13	
5	Al-Tijara	11	5	3	3	10	9	+1	13	
6	Al-Jaish	11	3	6	2	10	8	+2	12	
7	Al-Zawraa	11	3	4	4	14	17	−3	10	FA Cup Winners
8	Al-Minaa	11	3	4	4	8	14	−6	10	
9	Al-Sinaa	11	1	6	4	8	12	−4	8	
9	Salahaddin	11	1	6	4	8	12	−4	8	
11	Al-Amana	11	1	5	5	13	15	−2	7	
12	Al-Adhamiya	11	0	1	10	3	29	−26	1	Relegated to Iraqi National Second Division

Source: Ali Al-Sabti Archive

== Results ==
Home \ Away	ADH	AMN	JSH	MIN	SHB	SHR	SIN	TLB	TAY	TJR	ZWR	SAL
Al-Adhamiya				1–1								
Al-Amana	4–0				0–0				1–1			
Al-Jaish	2–0	2–1		0–0			0–0			1–0		1–1
Al-Minaa		1–1			2–0						1–0	1–0
Al-Shabab	2–1		1–0				2–0		2–1	0–0	2–2	4–1
Al-Shorta	4–0	3–1	1–1	3–0	1–0			2–1		1–1	3–0	
Al-Sinaa	3–1	1–1		0–0		1–1						0–0
Al-Talaba	6–0	1–0	1–0	3–1	1–0		2–0			2–0	1–0	0–0
Al-Tayaran	2–0		1–1	4–0		1–1	2–1	2–1		2–0	1–0	0–0
Al-Tijara	2–0	1–0		2–1			1–0					1–0
Al-Zawraa	1–0	3–2	2–2				2–2			2–2		2–1
Salahaddin	2–0	2–2				1–1						

Source: Ali Al-Sabti Archive
Legend: Blue = home team win; Yellow = draw; Red = away team win.

== Season statistics ==
=== Top scorers ===
Pos	Scorer	Goals	Team
1	Hussein Saeed	11	Al-Talaba
2	Ali Hussein Mahmoud	9	Al-Shorta
3	Faisal Aziz	5	Al-Shorta
3	Karim Mousa	5	Al-Shabab

=== Hat-tricks ===
Player	For	Against	Result	Date
(Iraq) Hussein Saeed^{4}	Al-Talaba	Al-Adhamiya	6–0	16 February 1981
(Iraq) Faisal Aziz	Al-Shorta	Al-Amana	3–1	26 April 1981
(Iraq) Ali Hussein Mahmoud	Al-Shorta	Al-Zawraa	3–0	19 May 1981

Notes

^{4} Player scored 4 goals
