= 1979–80 Iraqi National League =

Iraqi National League
- Season: 1979–80
- Champions: Al-Shorta (1st title)
- Relegated: Al-Bahri
- Arab Club Champions Cup: Al-Shorta
- Top goalscorer: Ali Hussein Mahmoud (18 goals)

The 1979–80 Iraqi National Clubs First Division League was the 6th season of the competition since its foundation in 1974. Al-Shorta won their first Premier League title, qualifying them for the inaugural edition of the Arab Club Champions Cup which they went on to win.

The race for the title went to the last matchday; Al-Shorta beat Al-Minaa 3–1 in their last game to go top of the league but Al-Zawraa would win the league if they managed to beat Al-Shabab. Al-Zawraa drew their match 1–1, therefore Al-Shorta were crowned champions, winning the title on goal difference.

== League table ==
Pos	Team	Pld	W	D	L	GF	GA	GD	Pts	Qualification or relegation
1	Al-Shorta (C)	22	14	7	1	41	15	+26	35	1981–82 Arab Club Champions Cup
2	Al-Zawraa	22	15	5	2	36	13	+23	35	
3	Al-Talaba	22	11	5	6	28	14	+14	27	
4	Al-Shabab	22	10	6	6	26	19	+7	26	
5	Al-Jaish	22	6	10	6	22	23	−1	22	FA Cup Winners
6	Al-Tijara	22	7	8	7	14	18	−4	22	
7	Al-Sinaa	22	7	8	7	16	27	−11	22	
8	Al-Amana	22	6	8	8	25	24	+1	20	
9	Al-Tayaran	22	7	6	9	20	21	−1	20	
10	Al-Minaa	22	7	6	9	26	29	−3	20	
11	Salahaddin	22	2	7	13	8	27	−19	11	
12	Al-Bahri	22	0	4	18	14	46	−32	4	Relegated to Iraqi National Second Division

Source: Ali Al-Sabti Archive
(C) Champions

== Results ==
Home \ Away	AMN	BAH	JSH	MIN	SHB	SHR	SIN	TLB	TAY	TJR	ZWR	SAL
Al-Amana		3–1	1–4	4–0	0–1	1–1	4–0	0–2	0–0	0–0	1–2	1–0
Al-Bahri	0–1		0–1	0–1	1–4	1–2	1–2	1–1	1–2	0–1	2–3	1–1
Al-Jaish	1–1	3–1		0–0	1–1	2–3	1–1	0–1	0–0	1–0	1–2	1–1
Al-Minaa	3–1	4–1	0–0		0–1	2–2	4–1	0–2	4–2	1–0	1–2	0–0
Al-Shabab	2–1	3–1	0–0	2–2		1–1	2–1	0–0	1–0	3–0	1–1	1–0
Al-Shorta	0–0	4–0	5–0	3–1	2–1		4–0	3–2	1–0	2–0	1–1	1–0
Al-Sinaa	0–0	2–1	1–1	2–1	0–1	0–0		1–0	1–0	0–0	0–1	1–0
Al-Talaba	4–1	2–1	1–0	3–0	2–0	2–0	0–1		0–0	0–0	0–2	4–1
Al-Tayaran	2–0	2–0	1–2	0–1	1–0	0–0	1–1	0–1		5–3	1–1	1–0
Al-Tijara	1–1	0–0	1–1	1–1	1–0	0–2	0–0	1–0	2–0		1–0	1–0
Al-Zawraa	0–0	4–0	1–0	1–0	3–1	1–2	4–0	2–1	1–0	1–0		0–0
Salahaddin	0–4	0–0	1–2	1–0	1–0	0–2	1–1	0–0	1–2	0–1	0–3	

Source: Ali Al-Sabti Archive
Legend: Blue = home team win; Yellow = draw; Red = away team win.

== Season statistics ==
=== Top scorers ===
Pos	Scorer	Goals	Team
1	Ali Hussein Mahmoud	18	Al-Shorta
2	Jalil Hanoon	13	Al-Minaa
3	Thamer Yousif	12	Al-Zawraa

=== Hat-tricks ===
Player	For	Against	Result	Date
(Iraq) Hussein Saeed	Al-Talaba	Salahaddin	4–1	10 October 1979
(Iraq) Jalil Hanoon^{4}	Al-Minaa	Al-Tayaran	4–2	20 November 1979
(Iraq) Ghazi Hashim	Al-Amana	Al-Minaa	4–0	3 January 1980
(Iraq) Ara Hamparsum	Al-Tayaran	Al-Tijara	5–3	16 January 1980
(Iraq) Adel Khudhair	Al-Zawraa	Al-Bahri	3–2	27 January 1980

Notes

^{4} Player scored 4 goals
