= 1990–91 Iraqi National League =

Iraqi National League
- Season: 1990–91
- Champions: Al-Zawraa (4th title)
- Relegated: Al-Jaish; Al-Bahri
- Top goalscorer: Karim Saddam (20 goals)

The 1990–91 Iraqi National Clubs First Division League was the 17th season of the competition since its foundation in 1974. The league title was won by Al-Zawraa for the first time since the 1978–79 season. They also won the Iraq FA Cup to complete the double.

At the halfway stage of the season, the Ministry of Defence decided to dissolve its teams (including Al-Tayaran, Al-Jaish and Al-Bahri) as part of cutbacks following the Gulf War. After protests from supporters, Al-Tayaran were brought back within less than two weeks but under the new name of Al-Quwa Al-Jawiya (meaning Air Force), which was the name the club had used prior to 1974.

Also at the halfway stage of the season, Erbil withdrew from the competition due to the 1991 uprisings in Iraq, so the Iraq U19 team was brought in to play the remaining half of the season.

== Name changes ==
- Al-Tayaran renamed to Al-Quwa Al-Jawiya halfway through the season.

== League table ==
Pos	Team	Pld	W	D	L	GF	GA	GD	Pts	Qualification or relegation
1	Al-Zawraa	28	19	8	1	66	22	+44	46	League Champions and FA Cup Winners
2	Al-Talaba	28	17	7	4	49	22	+27	41	
3	Al-Shorta	28	15	9	4	38	18	+20	39	
4	Al-Karkh	28	14	10	4	45	24	+21	38	
5	Al-Naft	28	14	8	6	27	13	+14	36	
6	Al-Quwa Al-Jawiya	28	10	12	6	38	25	+13	32	
7	Al-Najaf	28	10	6	12	29	33	−4	26	
8	Al-Minaa	28	7	9	12	17	24	−7	23	
9	Samarra	28	6	10	12	23	31	−8	22	
10	Al-Sulaikh	28	5	11	12	18	31	−13	21	
11	Al-Shabab	28	6	9	13	16	36	−20	21	
12	Al-Jaish (Note: Al-Jaish and Al-Bahri were dissolved by the Ministry of Defence at the halfway point of the season, and their results were not annulled. Both teams were reconstituted for the following season but were demoted to the lower tier.)	15	6	6	3	16	10	+6	18	Relegated to Iraqi National Second Division
13	Al-Tijara	28	4	9	15	22	39	−17	17	
14	Iraq U19 (Note: The Iraq U19 team played the second half of the season to make up for Erbil's withdrawal; they did not feature in the following season.)	13	4	5	4	8	13	−5	13	
15	Al-Sinaa	28	4	5	19	14	47	−33	13	
16	Al-Bahri	15	1	7	7	2	14	−12	9	Relegated to Iraqi National Second Division
17	Erbil (Note: Erbil withdrew from the league at the halfway point of the season due to the 1991 uprisings in Iraq. Their results were not annulled.)	15	2	3	10	9	35	−26	7	

Source: Ali Al-Sabti Archive

== Results ==
Home \ Away	BHR	JSH	KAR	MIN	NFT	NJF	QWJ	SHB	SHR	SIN	SLK	TLB	TJR	ZWR	ERB	IRQ	SMR
Al-Bahri (Note: Al-Jaish and Al-Bahri were dissolved by the Ministry of Defence at the halfway point of the season, and their results were not annulled. Both teams were reconstituted for the following season but were demoted to the lower tier.)				0–0	0–1	0–0	0–0	0–0			0–1		1–0		1–1		
Al-Jaish	0–0			2–0	0–1	2–0		3–2		1–0	0–0	0–1	2–1				0–0
Al-Karkh	1–0	2–0		0–0	0–1	3–2	0–0	1–1	1–1	6–2	0–0	4–1	3–1	3–3	4–0	2–0	1–0
Al-Minaa			0–1		0–0	0–1	1–0	2–0	1–1	2–1	0–1	1–1	2–1	0–1		1–1	0–1
Al-Naft			0–2	2–0		2–0	0–0	3–0	0–1	1–0	0–0	0–0	0–0	2–3			1–0
Al-Najaf			2–1	3–2	1–1		1–1	3–0	1–1	2–0	2–0	2–0	0–0	1–2			0–2
Al-Quwa Al-Jawiya		2–2	0–1	0–0	2–1	0–1		6–0	2–2	2–0	2–1	1–1	4–0	1–6		0–0	1–1
Al-Shabab			0–0	1–0	0–0	1–0	0–1		0–1	1–0	1–2	0–1	0–0	1–5		0–0	0–0
Al-Shorta	1–0	0–0	5–3	0–1	1–2	3–0	2–0	1–0		2–1	4–0	0–0	3–2	1–0	2–0	1–1	1–0
Al-Sinaa	0–0		1–2	0–1	1–0	1–0	1–3	0–1	0–0		1–0	0–2	0–0	0–4	1–2		1–1
Al-Sulaikh			0–0	0–0	0–1	0–0	1–4	0–0	1–1	1–1		0–1	1–1	0–2		2–0	1–1
Al-Talaba	5–0		2–2	1–0	0–1	2–0	1–1	3–0	1–0	3–0	2–0		2–1	3–3	3–0		4–0
Al-Tijara			0–1	0–0	0–2	1–2	1–1	3–2	0–2	3–0	2–1	1–2		0–0	0–2		2–2
Al-Zawraa	3–0	0–0	2–1	1–0	1–1	4–1	1–0	1–1	1–0	6–1	4–2	4–1	1–0		1–1	4–0	1–1
Erbil (Note: Erbil withdrew from the league at the halfway point of the season due to the 1991 uprisings in Iraq. Their results were not annulled.)		1–4		0–3 (Note: Erbil withdrew from their matches in rounds 12 to 15 due to the 1991 uprisings in Iraq. Their opponents (Al-Minaa, Al-Sulaikh, Al-Naft and Al-Shabab respectively) were all awarded 3–0 wins.)	0–3	0–3	0–2	0–3			0–3						2–2
Iraq U19 (Note: The Iraq U19 team played the second half of the season to make up for Erbil's withdrawal; they did not feature in the following season.)					1–0	1–0				1–0		0–2	2–0				
Samarra	1–0		0–0	4–0	0–1	3–1	0–2	0–1	0–1	0–1	1–0	1–4	1–2	0–2		1–1	

Source: Ali Al-Sabti Archive
Legend: Blue = home team win; Yellow = draw; Red = away team win.

== Season statistics ==
=== Top scorers ===
Pos	Scorer	Goals	Team
1	Karim Saddam	20	Al-Zawraa
2	Ahmed Radhi	19	Al-Zawraa
3	Natiq Hashim	17	Al-Quwa Al-Jawiya

=== Hat-tricks ===
Player	For	Against	Result	Date
(Iraq) Abdul-Rahman Mahdi	Samarra	Al-Minaa	4–0	23 November 1990
(Iraq) Natiq Hashim	Al-Tayaran	Al-Shabab	6–0	8 December 1990
(Iraq) Sabah Jeayer	Al-Talaba	Al-Sinaa	3–0	8 April 1991
(Iraq) Karim Saddam	Al-Zawraa	Al-Sinaa	4–0	20 April 1991
(Iraq) Natiq Hashim	Al-Quwa Al-Jawiya	Al-Sulaikh	4–1	10 June 1991
