= Wojciech Przybylski =

Polish football manager (1939–2021)

Personal information
- Full name: Wojciech Wiesław Przybylski
- Date of birth: 7 August 1939
- Place of birth: Tczew, Poland
- Date of death: 8 January 2021 (aged 81)

Youth career
- Unia Wąbrzeźno

Senior career*
Years	Team	Apps	(Gls)
- Pomorzanin Toruń
- AZS Warszawa
- Broń Radom

Managerial career
- 1971–1975: Polonia Gdańsk
- 1975–1978: Bałtyk Gdynia (assistant)
- 1979–1980: Lechia Gdańsk
- 1982–1983: Al-Jaish
- * Club domestic league appearances and goals

Wojciech Wiesław Przybylski (7 August 1939 – 8 January 2021) was a Polish sports and political activist, and a former football player and manager.

== Early years ==
In 1953 Przybylski started to get involved with his local football team, Unia Wąbrzeźno. From 1954 to 1956, Przybylski was involved with the "Association of Black Scouts of Toruń" (Polish: toruńskiego Związku Czarnych Skautów) an illegal anti-communist organization. In 1959 he graduated from his high school in Wąbrzeźno.

== Football ==
Przybylski had a professional footballing career which lasted until 1968. He played for Pomorzanin Toruń, AZS Warszawa and Broń Radom. After his playing days Przybylski went into coaching and management from 1971 to 1983, initially working at three teams with all three teams being in the Tricity area of Poland. His first management role was with Polonia Gdańsk, who finished runners up in the III liga (group IV) in 1971–72 before winning the league the season after. After promotion Polonia comfortably stayed in the II liga for the following seasons. In 1975 Przybylski became the assistant manager of Bałtyk Gdynia. The team continued to progress during his time at the club, with the team finishing 3rd in the II liga for the 1977–78 season. Przybylski left Bałtyk in 1978 and experienced his last role in management in Poland with Lechia Gdańsk for the 1979–80 season. Lechia finished mid-table under his leadership, but Przybylski left the role at the end of the season. In 1982 Przybylski moved to Iraq to manage Al-Jaish. He spent a season with the club, finishing 5th in the league, and winning the 1982–83 Iraq FA Cup.

== Education ==
After graduating from school in 1959, Przybylski went on to complete his Teacher Training in Radom in 1961, graduate from the Józef Piłsudski University of Physical Education in Warsaw in 1964, graduated after studying pedagogy at the University of Warsaw in 1967, obtained his PhD degree in humanities at the University of Gdańsk in 1987, followed by doctor habilitation of physical education sciences at the National University of Ukraine on Physical Education and Sport in 1999.

== After football ==
Przybylski has held various different roles since finishing his football career, often using his qualifications in the roles he has. From 1999 to 2002 he held various teaching roles at the Academy of Physical Education in Gdańsk, while also becoming the dean and the head of the football department for two terms spanning 2002–2008. From 2000 to 2004 he was on the Polish Football Association (Polish: PZPN) before becoming a spokesperson for the ethics committee of the PZPN. From 2000 to 2008 he was the president for the AZS AWFiS Gdańsk sports club, has been the chairman of the Gdańsk sports council, he was a representative of the Gdańsk Regional Football Association in the Organizing Committee for the European Championships in 2012. He has been the regional vice-president of the Polish People's Party since 2008, being involved in elections in 2007, 2009, 2015 and 2018. Each of which have been unsuccessful.

In 2001, he was awarded the Knight's Cross of the Order of Polonia Restituta.

== Honours ==
=== Manager ===
Polonia Gdańsk

- III liga, group IV: 1972–73

Al-Jaish

- Iraq FA Cup: 1982–83
