= Iraq Stars League =

Top-tier professional football league in Iraq

- Organising body: Iraqi Pro League Association
- Founded: 18 August 1974; 52 years ago
- Country: Iraq
- Confederation: AFC
- Number of clubs: 20 (since 2014–15)
- Level on pyramid: 1
- Relegation to: Iraqi Premier Division League
- Domestic cup(s): Iraq FA Cup; Iraqi Super Cup
- International cup(s): AFC Champions League Elite; AFC Champions League Two; Arab Club Champions Cup; GFF Gulf Club Champions League
- Current champions: Al-Quwa Al-Jawiya (8th title) (2025–26)
- Most championships: Al-Zawraa (14 titles)
- Top scorer: Amjad Radhi (180)
- Broadcasters: Al-Iraqiya TV; Al-Kass Sports
- Website: iraqstarsleague.com
- Current: 2026–27 Iraq Stars League

The Iraq Stars League (Arabic: دوري نجوم العراق, romanized: Dawrī Nujūm Al-'Irāq) is the highest level of the Iraqi football league system. Contested by 20 clubs, it operates on a system of promotion and relegation with the Iraqi Premier Division League. It is governed by the Iraqi Pro League Association.

The league was formed by the Iraq Football Association in 1974 as the Iraqi National Clubs First Division League, the first nationwide league of clubs in Iraq, and later became known as the Iraqi Premier League. In 2023, the competition was rebranded as the Iraq Stars League and transitioned into a fully professional competition. The current format sees 20 teams playing 38 matches each (playing each team in the league twice, home and away), totalling 380 matches in the season.

Of the 83 teams to have competed since the inception of the league in 1974, eleven have won the title. Al-Zawraa are the most successful club with 14 titles, followed by Al-Shorta (8), Al-Quwa Al-Jawiya (8) and Al-Talaba (5); these four clubs together contest the Baghdad derbies. The current league champions are Al-Quwa Al-Jawiya, who won the title in the 2025–26 season.

== History ==
=== Origins ===
Up until 1973, leagues in Iraq were organised on a regional basis, reflecting the country's administrative and geographic divisions. The Central FA League (for teams in Baghdad and its neighbouring cities), the Basra League and the Kirkuk League were all founded in 1948, while the Mosul League was founded in 1950.

The first nationwide league was introduced in the 1973–74 season under the name of Iraqi National First Division League, in which Al-Quwa Al-Jawiya were crowned champions. This competition represented the first attempt to establish a unified national league championship. However, it included both clubs and institute-representative teams (such as military or ministry sides).

=== Foundation and early years (1974–1983) ===
On 18 August 1974, the Iraq Football Association (IFA) decided to restructure the domestic football pyramid by introducing a new National Clubs First Division League which was restricted to club sides only, thereby marking the transition to a fully club-based national league structure. The league held its first season in 1974–75 and was originally composed of ten clubs. The league's first ever goal was scored by Falah Hassan of Al-Tayaran (now known as Al-Quwa Al-Jawiya) in a 1–1 draw with Al-Sinaa. Al-Tayaran were crowned champions of the inaugural season, which featured the following teams:

- Al-Baladiyat
- Al-Jaish
- Al-Muwasalat
- Al-Naqil
- Al-Rafidain
- Al-Samawa
- Al-Sinaa
- Al-Shorta
- Al-Tayaran
- Babil

Al-Zawraa established themselves as the league's first dominant force, winning the 1975–76 title and securing the first domestic double in Iraqi football history. The following season, 1976–77, was cut short due to scheduling difficulties, with the IFA declaring Al-Zawraa champions based on the standings at the halfway point.

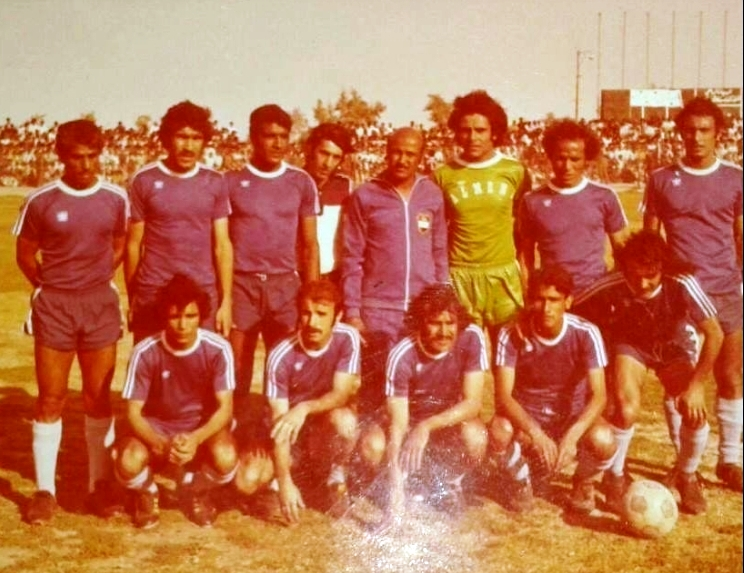
Al-Minaa became the first team from outside Baghdad to win the league title in the 1977–78 season.

A key development came in 1977–78 when Al-Minaa won the league unbeaten, becoming the first club from outside Baghdad to claim the national title, demonstrating the potential for clubs from other provinces to compete at the highest level. However, by the end of the 1970s and the beginning of the 1980s, "Baghdad's Big Four" clubs (Al-Quwa Al-Jawiya, Al-Shorta, Al-Talaba and Al-Zawraa) had begun to establish dominance over the competition. The 1980s were heavily influenced by the Iran–Iraq War, which disrupted sporting schedules. The 1980–81 season, for example, was reduced to a single round-robin format due to logistical constraints.

=== Politicisation of league football (1983–1990) ===
The 1980s saw increased politicisation of football in Iraq, with state-backed institutions playing a greater role in club organisation. This coincided with the rise of Al-Rasheed, a club founded in 1983 by Uday Hussein, the son of the Iraqi president Saddam Hussein, who would later become president of the Iraq Football Association. Al-Rasheed quickly emerged as a dominant force in Iraqi football, with the club assembling many of the country's leading players, including several members of the Iraq national football team and its coach Ammo Baba.

The 1984–85 season was cancelled due to conflicts with national team commitments, with Al-Rasheed leading the table at the time of cancellation. Between 1986–87 and 1988–89, Al-Rasheed won three consecutive league titles, becoming the first club in the league's history to achieve this feat. During this period, the club also secured two Iraq FA Cup titles and enjoyed success in regional competitions, including three consecutive Arab Club Champions Cup titles from 1985 to 1987.

Al-Rasheed's dominance over the league temporarily disrupted the traditional rivalry among Baghdad's Big Four, however the club was dissolved in 1990, and its players were redistributed among other leading sides, contributing to the re-establishment of the competitive landscape and leading to a resurgence among the traditional top clubs.

=== "Baghdad's Big Four" dominance (1990–2003) ===
Results of the 'Big Four' from 1990 to 2002
Season	QWJ	SHR	TLB	ZWR
1989–90	1	3	6	4
1990–91	6	3	2	1
1991–92	1	5	4	2
1992–93	3	4	1	2
1993–94	2	5	3	1
1994–95	2	6	4	1
1995–96	8	3	6	1
1996–97	1	5	3	2
1997–98	2	1	5	3
1998–99	3	5	2	1
1999–2000	2	3	4	1
2000–01	2	3	4	1
2001–02	2	3	1	4
Top four	11	8	10	13
out of 13
League champions

The league entered a period of relative structural stability and stronger competition during the 1990s. "Baghdad's Big Four" clubs — Al-Zawraa, Al-Quwa Al-Jawiya, Al-Talaba and Al-Shorta who together contest the Baghdad derbies — dominated the competition almost entirely during this period. Between the 1989–90 and 2005–06 seasons, every league title was won by one of these four clubs.

The 1990s were particularly successful for Al-Zawraa, who emerged as the most decorated club of the era. The club won the league and cup double in three consecutive seasons from 1993–94 to 1995–96. During this period, the competition was rebranded several times, as the Iraq Football Association experimented with a number of different competition structures and rules, including the awarding of bonus points in the 1994–95 season and the introduction of regional qualifying rounds in the 2000–01 season. Despite these administrative changes, the competitive hierarchy remained largely unchanged. Clubs from outside Baghdad occasionally mounted challenges, but were generally unable to sustain title bids over an entire season. As a result, Baghdad's Big Four maintained near-total control of domestic honours.

=== Aftermath of invasion and war (2003–2011) ===
The 2003 invasion of Iraq and subsequent Iraq War marked a major turning point in the history of the league, and caused sustained disruption to Iraqi domestic football. The 2002–03 season was cancelled following the outbreak of conflict, while the 2003–04 campaign was also cancelled due to ongoing security concerns and organisational difficulties. From the 2003–04 season until the 2010–11 season, clubs were separated into regional groups rather than competing in the traditional round-robin format to facilitate easier travel and reduce the number of games for teams.

The instability in Baghdad caused by the war significantly altered the competitive landscape of the league. Many players left the capital in search of greater security and financial stability, joining clubs in the comparatively safer northern regions, particularly in the Kurdistan area. This migration of talent weakened the traditional Baghdad-based powerhouses and contributed to a temporary shift in competitive strength. Erbil became the dominant club of the late 2000s, winning three consecutive league titles from 2006–07 to 2008–09, while Duhok secured the 2009–10 championship. These successes represented the first sustained challenge to the dominance of the top Baghdad sides since the league's formative years.

The 2008–09 season was particularly notable as the only campaign in which none of Baghdad's Big Four finished in the top four positions. Instead, the leading places were occupied by Erbil, Al-Najaf, Duhok and Al-Amana, underlining the extent of the temporary shift in competitive balance.

=== Influx of foreign professionals (2011–2023) ===
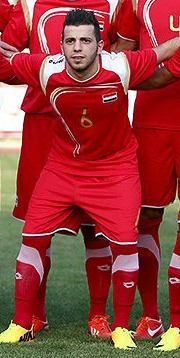
Syrian forward Mahmoud Al-Mawas is the highest-scoring foreign player in the league's history.

The league returned to its traditional home and away round-robin format in the 2011–12 season and began to attract foreign players and coaches, particularly from Africa, South America and the Middle East. In 2012, Syrian coach Nizar Mahrous became the first foreign manager to win the league title and Cameroonian striker Jean Michel N'Lend became the first foreign player to score a hat-trick. The 2012–13 season saw Al-Shorta dethrone Erbil at the top of the table, as the traditional Baghdad-based clubs began to reassert their dominance, driven by improved security conditions, greater financial stability, and the renewed concentration of elite players in the capital.

Since the 2015–16 season, every league title has been won by either Al-Quwa Al-Jawiya, Al-Shorta or Al-Zawraa, marking a return to the league's long-standing competitive structure. The 2010s also saw a series of incremental administrative reforms aimed at modernising Iraqi domestic football, as efforts were made to improve league organisation, infrastructure, and governance standards. In the 2013–14 season, matches began being broadcast in 16:9 aspect ratio for the first time by Waar TV, and Qatari network Al-Kass Sports Channels purchased the rights to broadcast a select number of high-profile matches from the league in high-definition to a wider audience in the region. Stadium licensing rules were gradually tightened, with modern stadiums such as Basra International Stadium, Karbala International Stadium, Zakho International Stadium and Al-Najaf International Stadium becoming regular venues for league matches. Prior to the start of the 2020–21 season, the Iraq Football Association unveiled the league's first ever logo and announced a partnership with Umbro to manufacture an official match ball for the first time in the league's history.

=== "Stars League" era (2023–present) ===
A major structural transformation occurred in 2023 when the Iraq Football Association (IFA) signed a three-year partnership agreement with Spain's Liga Nacional de Fútbol Profesional (LaLiga) to professionalise the Iraqi top flight. As part of this reform, the competition was rebranded as the Iraq Stars League and designed to meet the club licensing requirements set by the Asian Football Confederation (AFC).

A new governing body, the Iraqi Pro League Association, was established to operate the competition and oversee its associated youth systems. Chaired by Javier Jiménez Sacristán and Matteo Mantovani, the organisation was tasked with implementing professional standards in league management, commercial operations and infrastructure development. LaLiga also began training an Iraqi administrative team to assume full operational control of the league following the conclusion of the partnership.

The inaugural Iraq Stars League season began on 26 October 2023, marking the first fully professional campaign in the history of Iraqi domestic football. Al-Shorta won the first edition in 2023–24, securing their third consecutive league title and completing a domestic double. The club extended its dominance in 2024–25, becoming the first team in the competition's history to win four consecutive league championships.

== Competition format ==
=== Competition ===
The Stars League season typically runs from August to May, although scheduling may vary slightly from year to year depending on climatic conditions and international commitments. There are currently 20 clubs in the Iraq Stars League. Over the course of a season, each club plays the others twice (in a double round-robin system), once at home and once away, for a total of 38 games (however, Baghdad derbies are sometimes played at the neutral venue of Al-Shaab Stadium to accommodate larger crowds).

Teams receive three points for a win and one point for a draw. No points are awarded for a loss. Teams are ranked by points, followed by goal difference, goals scored, head-to-head points, head-to-head goal difference, head-to-head goals scored (if more than two teams are tied), number of wins, number of red cards and number of yellow cards. If teams remain level after all these criteria, a drawing of lots decides rank.

The winners and runners-up of the league qualify for the Iraqi Super Cup, along with the winners and runners-up of the Iraq FA Cup. If one of the FA Cup finalists finish in the league's top two positions, the third-placed team in the league enters the Super Cup, while if both FA Cup finalists finish in the league's top two positions, the third and fourth-placed teams in the league enter the Super Cup.

=== Squad registration ===
Each club must register a squad of at least 18 players up to a maximum of 30 players, which must include a minimum of five Iraqi players under the age of 21. Clubs can also use a maximum of five extra players from their youth teams who are not required to be registered for the first team. Each club is allowed a maximum of seven foreign outfield players in their squad, of which up to five can play at any given time, and no foreign goalkeepers are permitted. At least the first four foreign players in the squad must be from countries ranked in the top 90 positions in the FIFA Men's World Ranking as at the start of the summer transfer window.

=== Promotion and relegation ===
Typically, the bottom two teams in the Stars League are relegated to the Iraqi Premier Division League, while the top two teams from the Premier Division League are promoted to the Stars League. The team finishing 18th in the Stars League enters a two-legged play-off against the winner of the play-out round between the 3rd and 4th-placed teams from the Premier Division League for a spot in the next season’s Stars League. However, for the 2026–27 season, the bottom four teams in the Stars League will be relegated, while the top two teams from the Premier Division League will be promoted, in order to reduce the number of teams in the Stars League to 18 teams.

Number of clubs in the Iraqi top-flight
Season(s)	No. of clubs	Competition format
1974–75	10 clubs	Double round-robin
1975–76	13 clubs	Double round-robin
1976–77	12 clubs	Double round-robin (cut short to a single round-robin)
1977–78	14 clubs	Single round-robin
1978–79	13 clubs	Single round-robin
1979–80	12 clubs	Double round-robin
1980–81	12 clubs	Single round-robin
1981–82 to 1982–83	12 clubs	Double round-robin
1983–84	13 clubs	Double round-robin
1984–85	14 clubs	Double round-robin
1985–86	16 clubs	Single round-robin
1986–87	12 clubs	Quadruple round-robin
1987–88	16 clubs	Double round-robin
1988–89	29 clubs	Regional stage → national stage → knockout stage
1989–90	14 clubs	Double round-robin
1990–91	16 clubs	Double round-robin
1991–92	20 clubs	Double round-robin
1992–93	24 clubs	Triple round-robin
1993–94	26 clubs	Double round-robin
1994–95	24 clubs	Double round-robin
1995–96	12 clubs	Double round-robin
1996–97 to 1998–99	16 clubs	Double round-robin
1999–2000	26 clubs	Double round-robin
2000–01	16 clubs	Double round-robin
2001–02 to 2002–03	20 clubs	Double round-robin
2003–04	25 clubs	Group stage → elite stage → knockout stage
2004–05	36 clubs	Group stage → elite stage → knockout stage
2005–06	28 clubs	Group stage → elite stage → knockout stage
2006–07	24 clubs	Group stage → elite stage → knockout stage
2007–08	30 clubs	Group stage → elite stage → play-off round → knockout stage
2008–09	28 clubs	Group stage → championship play-off
2009–10	36 clubs	Group stage → elite stage → knockout stage
2010–11	28 clubs	Group stage → championship play-off
2011–12	20 clubs	Double round-robin
2012–13	18 clubs	Double round-robin
2013–14	16 clubs	Double round-robin
2014–15	20 clubs	Group stage → elite stage → championship play-off
2015–16	20 clubs	Group stage → elite stage
2016–17 to 2018–19	20 clubs	Double round-robin
2019–20	20 clubs	Double round-robin (restarted as a single round-robin)
2020–21 to present	20 clubs	Double round-robin

=== Video assistant referee ===
The video assistant referee (VAR) system was introduced in the Iraq Stars League at the start of the 2023–24 season as part of a broader effort to modernise officiating standards and align the competition with international best practices. Its implementation followed coordination between the Iraq Football Association (IFA) and FIFA, including the completion of technical, regulatory and training requirements necessary for its approval and operation.

VAR is used to assist the on-field referee in reviewing key match incidents, specifically in four situations: goals, penalty decisions, direct red card offences and cases of mistaken identity. The system relies on a team of video officials located in a centralised control environment, who analyse footage from multiple camera angles and communicate with the referee via a headset. Despite this assistance, the final decision in all cases remains with the on-field referee.

== Clubs ==
=== 2026–27 season ===
Twenty clubs are competing in the 2026–27 Iraq Stars League, including three promoted from the Premier Division League:

2026–27 Club	2025–26 Position	First season in the league	Seasons in the league	First season of current spell in the league	Titles	Most recent title
Al-Gharraf^{b}	14th	2025–26	2	2025–26	0	–
Al-Jolan^{b}	1st (PDL)	2026–27	1	2026–27	0	–
Al-Kahrabaa	17th	2004–05	22	2014–15	0	–
Al-Karkh	7th	1990–91	31	2018–19	0	–
Al-Karma^{b}	5th	2024–25	3	2024–25	0	–
Al-Minaa	15th	1975–76	49	2023–24	1	1977–78
Al-Mosul	13th	1982–83	22	2025–26	0	–
Al-Naft^{b}	11th	1985–86	42	1985–86	0	–
Al-Quwa Al-Jawiya^{a, b}	1st	1974–75	53	1974–75	8	2025–26
Al-Shorta^{a, b}	2nd	1974–75	53	1974–75	8	2024–25
Al-Talaba^{b}	6th	1975–76	52	1975–76	5	2001–02
Al-Zawraa^{b}	4th	1975–76	52	1975–76	14	2017–18
Diyala	12th	1975–76	17	2024–25	0	–
Duhok	10th	1988–89	24	2022–23	1	2009–10
Erbil	3rd	1987–88	35	2018–19	4	2011–12
Ghaz Al-Shamal^{b}	2nd (PDL)	2026–27	1	2026–27	0	–
Karbala	4th playoffs (PDL)	1992–93	24	2026–27	0	–
Naft Maysan	16th	2009–10	16	2013–14	0	–
Newroz^{b}	8th	2021–22	6	2021–22	0	–
Zakho	9th	2002–03	22	2019–20	0	–

^{a}: Founding member of the league
^{b}: Never been relegated from the league

==== Map ====
Location of clubs in Iraq for the 2026–27 Iraq Stars League season

=== Seasons ===
Since its first season in 1974–75 up until the 2026–27 season (not counting the qualifying rounds of the 2000–01 season), 83 teams have participated in at least one round of a top division season. Teams in bold are competing in the Iraq Stars League in the 2026–27 season. Teams in italics represent defunct teams. The year in parentheses represents the most recent year of participation at this level. Al-Quwa Al-Jawiya and Al-Shorta are the only teams to have competed in every season.

- **53** seasons: **Al-Quwa Al-Jawiya** (2027), **Al-Shorta** (2027)
- **52** seasons: **Al-Talaba** (2027), **Al-Zawraa** (2027)
- **49** seasons: **Al-Minaa** (2027)
- **42** seasons: **Al-Naft** (2027)
- **39** seasons: Al-Najaf (2026), Al-Sinaa (2023)
- **35** seasons: **Erbil** (2027)
- **32** seasons: Al-Jaish (2011)
- **31** seasons: **Al-Karkh** (2027)
- **28** seasons: Amanat Baghdad (2026)
- **24** seasons: **Duhok** (2027), **Karbala** (2027), Salahaddin (2010)
- **23** seasons: Samarra (2022)
- **22** seasons: **Al-Kahrabaa** (2027), **Al-Mosul** (2027), **Zakho** (2027)
- **20** seasons: Naft Al-Basra (2025)
- **19** seasons: Kirkuk (2013)
- **18** seasons: Al-Samawa (2021)
- **17** seasons: **Diyala** (2027)
- **16** seasons: Al-Shabab (1994), Al-Tijara (1993), **Naft Maysan** (2027)
- **15** seasons: Al-Diwaniya (2023)
- **14** seasons: Al-Ramadi (2011)
- **13** seasons: Al-Hudood (2025)
- **12** seasons: Al-Nasiriya (2011)
- **10** seasons: Al-Kut (2006), Naft Al-Wasat (2024)
- **9** seasons: Al-Bahri (2019), Al-Sulaikh (2006), Maysan (2010), Sulaymaniya (2015)
- **8** seasons: Babil (2005)
- **7** seasons: Al-Qasim (2026)
- **6** seasons: Al-Difaa Al-Jawi (2005), Al-Kadhimiya (2006), Al-Rasheed (1990), Masafi Al-Wasat (2015), **Newroz** (2027)
- **5** seasons: Pires (2010)
- **4** seasons: Al-Ittihad (1982), Al-Sinaat Al-Kahrabaiya (2021), Sirwan (2008)
- **3** seasons: Al-Amara (1995), Al-Baladiyat (1977), Al-Basra (2005), Al-Etisalat (2010), Al-Hilla (1978), Al-Hussein (2019), **Al-Karma** (2027), Al-Khutoot (1994), Al-Kufa (2010), Al-Shatra (2008), Al-Umal (1995)
- **2** seasons: Al-Adala (2008), Al-Furat (2008), **Al-Gharraf** (2027), Al-Hasanain (2011), Al-Hindiya (2011), Al-Salam (1993), Al-Shirqat (2012), Al-Shuala (2008), Al-Thawra (1979), Iraq U19 (1994) (Note: Played the second half of the 1990–91 season and played the first half of the 1993–94 season.)
- **1** season: Al-Adhamiya (1981), Al-Dawr Al-Ahli (1993), Al-Jamahir (1989), **Al-Jolan** (2027), Al-Muwasalat (1975), Al-Naqil (1975), Al-Numaniya (1989), Al-Rafidain (1975), Al-Taji (2012), Ararat (2006), Balad (2005), **Ghaz Al-Shamal** (2027), Haifa (2000), Masafi Al-Junoob (2010), Peshmerga (2011)

== Champions ==
=== Performance by club ===
Club	Titles	Winning seasons
Al-Zawraa	14	1975–76, 1976–77, 1978–79, 1990–91, 1993–94, 1994–95, 1995–96, 1998–99, 1999–2000, 2000–01, 2005–06, 2010–11, 2015–16, 2017–18
Al-Shorta	8	1979–80, 1997–98, 2012–13, 2018–19, 2021–22, 2022–23, 2023–24, 2024–25
Al-Quwa Al-Jawiya	8	1974–75, 1989–90, 1991–92, 1996–97, 2004–05, 2016–17, 2020–21, 2025–26
Al-Talaba	5	1980–81, 1981–82, 1985–86, 1992–93, 2001–02
Erbil	4	2006–07, 2007–08, 2008–09, 2011–12
Al-Rasheed	3	1986–87, 1987–88, 1988–89
Al-Minaa	1	1977–78
Salahaddin	1	1982–83
Al-Jaish	1	1983–84
Duhok	1	2009–10
Naft Al-Wasat	1	2014–15

== International competitions ==
=== Qualification for Asian competitions ===
The champions of the Iraq Stars League qualify for the subsequent season's AFC Champions League Elite preliminary stage, while the winners of the Iraq FA Cup qualify for the AFC Champions League Two group stage. If the same team wins both the Stars League and the FA Cup, the Stars League runners-up qualify for the AFC Champions League Two group stage. The number of places allocated to Iraqi clubs in AFC competitions depends on the country's position in the AFC club competitions ranking, which is calculated based on the performance of clubs in AFC competitions over the previous eight seasons.

Collectively, Iraqi teams have reached nine finals of Asian club competitions. Before the foundation of the national league, Aliyat Al-Shorta were the first Iraqi team to participate in the Asian Champion Club Tournament in 1971 and they reached the final, but they refused to play Israeli side Maccabi Tel Aviv and took the runner-up spot. Al-Rasheed reached the final of the Asian Club Championship in 1989 but they lost a two-legged final on away goals to Al-Saad of Qatar. Al-Talaba reached the final of the 1995–96 Asian Cup Winners' Cup but they lost it 2–1 to Bellmare Hiratsuka, while Al-Zawraa lost the final of the same competition 1–0 to Shimizu S-Pulse in 2000. Erbil reached the final of Asia's secondary tournament, the AFC Cup, twice in 2012 and 2014 but lost both times to Al-Kuwait and Al-Qadsia respectively. Al-Quwa Al-Jawiya managed to win the AFC Cup when they beat Indian club Bengaluru FC 1–0 in the 2016 final, and they won the competition for the second consecutive season in 2017 by beating FC Istiklol by the same scoreline. They earned a joint-record third AFC Cup title with a 2–0 defeat of Altyn Asyr in 2018.

=== Qualification for Arab competitions ===
The runners-up of the Iraq Stars League qualify for the Arab Club Champions Cup, which is organised by the Union of Arab Football Associations. The third-placed team in the Iraq Stars League and the runners-up of the Iraq FA Cup both qualify for the GFF Gulf Club Champions League, which is organised by the Gulf Football Federation.

Al-Shorta won the inaugural edition of the Arab Club Champions Cup in 1982 by defeating Al-Nejmeh 4–2 on aggregate in the final, and Al-Rasheed won the Arab Club Champions Cup three times in a row in 1985, 1986 and 1987 making them the competition's joint-most successful side. Meanwhile, Duhok won the GFF Gulf Club Champions League in the 2024–25 season by defeating Al-Qadsia 2–1 on aggregate in the final.

== Sponsorship ==
The league was founded as the National Clubs First Division League and has been renamed several times, with the current name of Stars League remaining in place since 2023. The competition has had title sponsorship rights sold to three companies: Zain Iraq in the 2009–10 season, Asiacell in the 2010–11 and 2011–12 seasons and Fuchs in the 2015–16 season.

Period	Sponsor	Name
1974–1988	No sponsor	National Clubs First Division League
1988–1989	No sponsor	Pan-National Clubs First Division League
1989–1995	No sponsor	National Clubs First Division League
1995–1996	No sponsor	Advanced League
1996–1999	No sponsor	Premier League
1999–2000	No sponsor	First Division League
2000–2002	No sponsor	Elite League
2002–2003	No sponsor	First Division League
2003–2009	No sponsor	Premier League
2009–2010	Zain Iraq	Zain Iraq League
2010–2012	Asiacell	Asiacell Elite League
2012–2013	No sponsor	Elite League
2013–2015	No sponsor	Premier League
2015–2016	Fuchs	Fuchs Premier League
2016–2023	No sponsor	Premier League
2023–present	No sponsor	Stars League

== Media coverage ==
The television rights for the Iraq Stars League are held by the Iraqi state broadcaster Al-Iraqiya through its sports channel, Al-Iraqiya Sports. In 2025, Al-Iraqiya Sports acquired the broadcasting rights for multiple domestic competitions, including the Iraq Stars League, the Iraqi Premier Division League, the Iraq FA Cup, the Iraqi Super Cup, and the Iraqi Futsal Pro League. The agreement, which also includes production rights, was reportedly valued at approximately 17 billion Iraqi dinars (around US$13 million) and involves both the Iraqi Pro League Association and its commercial partner, Ishtar Company.

Several Arab broadcasters have entered into negotiations with Al-Iraqiya Sports to obtain secondary rights. These include the Qatari network Al-Kass Sports Channels for selected high-profile matches and MBC Group for highlights coverage. Access to stadiums and media activities is regulated by Al-Iraqiya Sports, with other broadcasters required to reach agreements in order to provide on-site coverage and sports programming.

== Players ==
=== Top scorers ===
As of 20 November 2026.

Rank	Player	Goals	First app	Last app	Club(s) (goals)
1	(Iraq) Amjad Radhi	**180** (Note: Goal against Karbala (16 August 2010; match abandoned) and goal against Erbil (26 October 2016; match result annulled) are not counted.)	2007	2024	Al-Quwa Al-Jawiya (97), Erbil (75), Al-Najaf (8)
2	(Iraq) Sahib Abbas	**177**	1988	2012	Salahaddin (42), Al-Zawraa (62), Al-Talaba (18), Karbala (50), Al-Sinaa (5)
3	(Iraq) **Alaa Abdul-Zahra**	**174**	2004	present	Al-Zawraa (54), Duhok (26), Al-Shorta (78), Al-Minaa (11), Al-Talaba (5)
4	(Iraq) Karim Saddam	**171**	1979	1996	Al-Sinaa (23), Al-Jaish (11), Al-Rasheed (4), Al-Zawraa (127), Al-Shorta (6)
5	(Iraq) Ali Hashim	**170**	1987	2004	Al-Najaf (149), Al-Karkh (21)
6	(Iraq) Hussein Abdullah	**167**	1991	2010	Al-Sinaa (32), Al-Naft (16), Diyala (40), Duhok (58), Erbil (14), Kirkuk (2), Pires (5)
7	(Iraq) Hammadi Ahmed	**162** (Note: Goal against Al-Kahrabaa (25 October 2014; match awarded 0–3) and goal against Erbil (26 October 2016; match result annulled) are not counted.)	2005	2023	Samarra (19), Al-Quwa Al-Jawiya (143)
8	(Iraq) Younis Abid Ali	**157**	1983	2000	Al-Shorta (135), Al-Rasheed (15), Al-Quwa Al-Jawiya (3), Al-Difaa Al-Jawi (4)
9	(Iraq) Ahmed Radhi	**146**	1981	1999	Al-Zawraa (103), Al-Rasheed (43)
10	(Iraq) Alaa Kadhim	**145**	1988	2007	Al-Sinaa (8), Al-Talaba (137)

Bold denotes players still playing in the Iraq Stars League.

== Awards ==
=== Trophy ===
The current Iraq Stars League trophy was unveiled on 2 June 2026 and was designed and sculpted by the Iraqi painter and sculptor Ahmed Albahrani. It is a silver structure with curved, textured forms rising upward in a spiral shape. The trophy features an outline of the map of Iraq engraved towards the bottom, while it is topped by a stylised silver football. Its base is circular and bears an engraved plaque displaying the competition’s logo.

=== Individual awards ===
After each round of matches, fans vote for the 'Player of the Round' from a five-man shortlist posted on the Iraq Stars League's social media channels, while 'Player of the Month' and 'Manager of the Month' awards are handed out at the end of each month, selected by a panel of experts. At the end of each season, the 'Golden Boot' is awarded to the top scorer, while the 'Player of the Season' is selected by an expert panel and the 'Goal of the Season' is voted for by fans.

== Records ==
=== League records ===
Titles

- Most titles: 14, Al-Zawraa
- Most consecutive title wins: 4, Al-Shorta (2021–22, 2022–23, 2023–24, 2024–25)
- Biggest title-winning margin: 21 points, 2021–22; Al-Shorta (91 points) over Al-Quwa Al-Jawiya (70 points)
- Smallest title-winning margin: 0 points, 0 goal difference and 2 wins – 1980–81; Al-Talaba (8 wins) over Al-Shorta (6 wins)
- Earliest title win with the most games remaining: 7 games, Al-Shorta (2021–22)

Wins

- Most consecutive wins: 11 – joint record:
  - Al-Shorta (13 March – 22 May 1998)
  - Al-Quwa Al-Jawiya (22 January – 26 March 2026)
- Most consecutive wins from the start of a season: 9 – joint record:
  - Erbil (2008–09)
  - Al-Zawraa (2017–18)
- Most consecutive wins to the end of a season: 11, Al-Shorta (1997–98)
- Defeated all league opponents at least once in a season: joint record:
  - Al-Tayaran (1974–75, 9 opponents)
  - Al-Zawraa (2000–01, 15 opponents)
  - Al-Shorta (2021–22, 19 opponents)

Losses

- Fewest losses in a season: 0 – joint record:
  - Al-Zawraa four times (1976–77, 11 rounds, 1978–79, 12 rounds, 2005–06, 19 rounds, 2015–16, 24 rounds)
  - Al-Jamiea (1976–77, 11 rounds)
  - Al-Minaa (1977–78, 13 rounds)
  - Al-Shorta (1980–81, 11 rounds)
  - Salahaddin (1982–83, 22 rounds)
  - Al-Jaish (1983–84, 24 rounds)
- Longest unbeaten run: 39 games – joint record:
  - Al-Zawraa (25 November 1993 – 3 October 1994)
  - Al-Shorta (21 May 2018 – 23 May 2019)

Goals

- Most consecutive matches scored in: 43, Al-Shorta (4 April 1997 – 13 November 1998)
- Most consecutive matches without conceding a goal: 14, Erbil (16 July 2009 – 20 March 2010)
- Scored in every match during a season: joint record:
  - Al-Shorta twice (1980–81, 11 rounds, and 1997–98, 30 rounds)
  - Al-Zawraa (1976–77, 11 rounds)
  - Al-Minaa (1977–78, 13 rounds)
  - Karbala (2005–06, 16 rounds up to elimination)

=== Match records ===
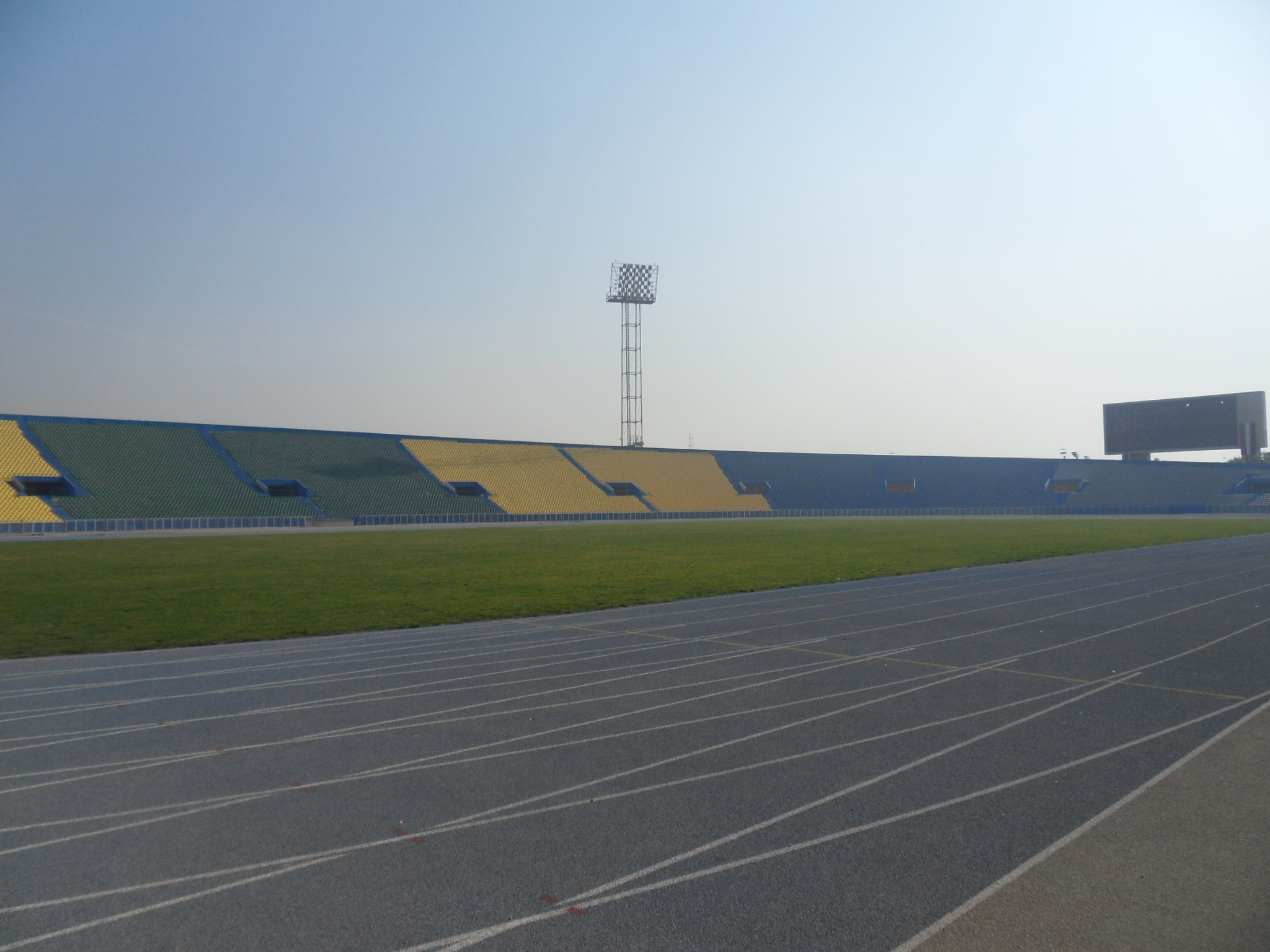
The highest attendance ever recorded for an Iraq Stars League match was between Al-Shorta and Al-Zawraa at Al-Shaab Stadium in 1991.

Scorelines

- Highest scoring match: 11 goals – joint record:
  - Al-Naqil 11–0 Al-Shorta (12 October 1974)
  - Al-Ramadi 11–0 Kirkuk (15 May 1995)
  - Al-Quwa Al-Jawiya 9–2 Al-Diwaniya (11 May 2023)

Attendances

- Highest attendance, single game: 68,000, Al-Shorta v. Al-Zawraa (at Al-Shaab Stadium, 13 December 1991)

=== Player records ===
Appearances

- Youngest player: Mohanad Ali, 13 years and 279 days (for Al-Shorta v. Al-Talaba, 26 March 2014)

Titles

- Most titles: 7 – joint record:
  - Salam Hashim (three with Al-Rasheed in 1986–87, 1987–88 and 1988–89 and four with Al-Zawraa in 1990–91, 1993–94, 1994–95 and 1995–96)
  - Mudhahar Khalaf (three with Al-Rasheed in 1986–87, 1987–88 and 1988–89, three with Al-Zawraa in 1993–94, 1994–95 and 1995–96 and one with Al-Quwa Al-Jawiya in 1996–97)
  - Mohamed Jassim Mahdi (seven with Al-Zawraa in 1990–91, 1993–94, 1994–95, 1995–96, 1998–99, 1999–2000, 2000–01)
- Most titles as captain: 3 – joint record:
  - Hazem Jassam (three with Al-Zawraa in 1975–76, 1976–77 and 1978–79)
  - Ahmed Radhi (one with Al-Rasheed in 1988–89 and two with Al-Zawraa in 1990–91 and 1998–99)
  - Rafid Badr Al-Deen (three with Erbil in 2006–07, 2007–08 and 2008–09)
  - Alaa Abdul-Zahra (three with Al-Shorta in 2021–22, 2022–23 and 2023–24)

Goals

- Most goals: 180, Amjad Radhi
- Most goals for one club: 149, Ali Hashim (for Al-Najaf)
- Most top scorer awards: 4, Karim Saddam (1988–89, 1989–90, 1990–91, 1992–93)
- Most consecutive top scorer awards: 3 – joint record:
  - Rahim Hameed (1985–86, 1986–87, 1987–88)
  - Karim Saddam (1988–89, 1989–90, 1990–91)
- Most goals in a season: 36, Younis Abid Ali (1993–94, 50 rounds)
- Most goals in a single game: 6 – joint record:
  - Shakir Mohammed Sabbar (for Al-Ramadi v. Kirkuk, 15 May 1995)
  - Sahib Abbas (for Al-Zawraa v. Al-Karkh, 18 October 1996)
  - Alaa Kadhim (for Al-Talaba v. Al-Mosul, 9 January 1998)
- Fastest goal: 9.504 seconds, Alaa Abdul-Zahra (for Al-Shorta v. Naft Al-Junoob, 21 October 2018)
- Most hat-tricks: 10 – joint record:
  - Qahtan Chathir
  - Sahib Abbas
- Most hat-tricks in a season: 4, Qahtan Chathir (Al-Karkh, 1999–2000)

=== Managerial records ===
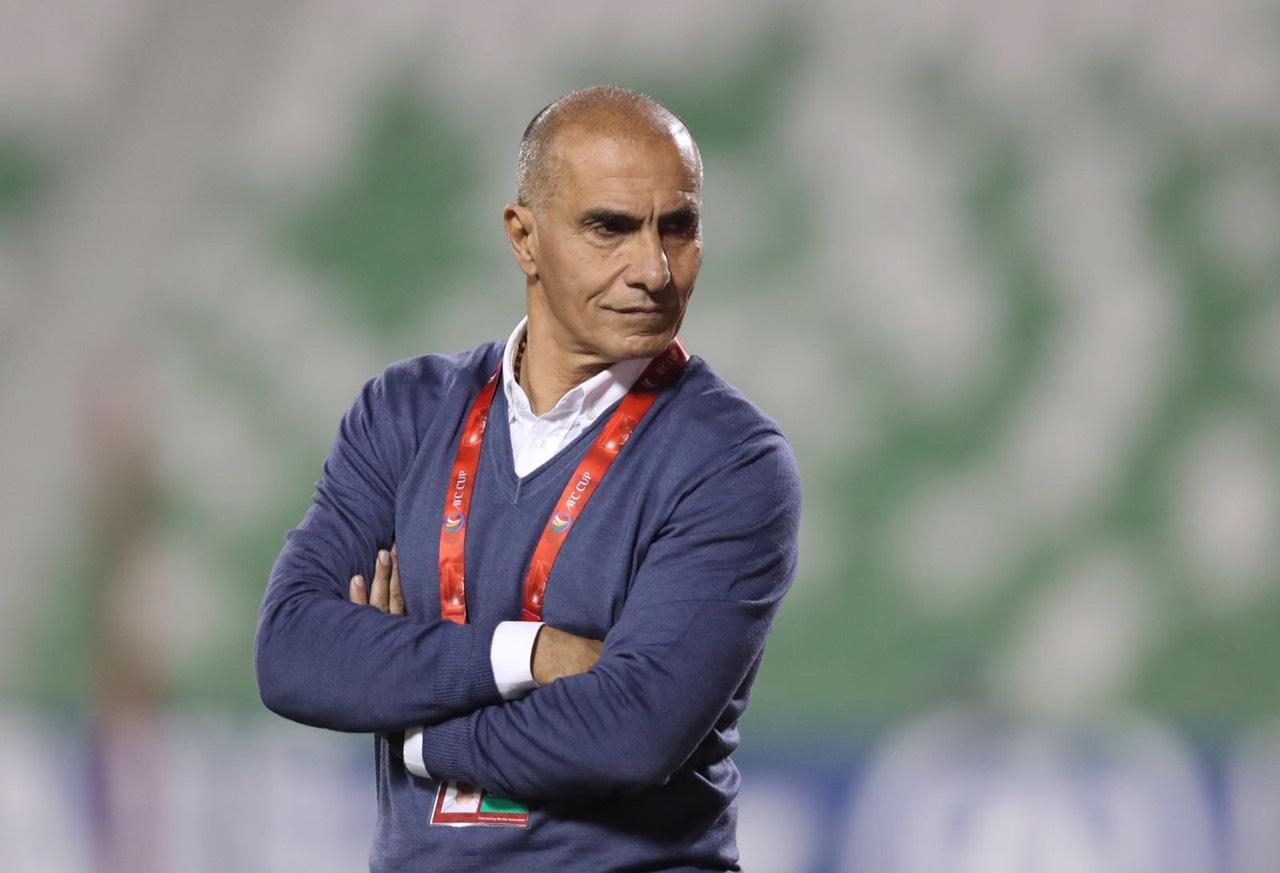
Ayoub Odisho is the most successful manager in Iraq Stars League history, having won four league titles.

Titles

The following managers have won multiple titles:

Manager	Club(s)	Wins	Winning seasons
(Iraq) Ayoub Odisho	Al-Talaba, Al-Quwa Al-Jawiya (2), Al-Zawraa	4	1992–93, 1996–97, 2017–18, 2020–21
(Iraq) Jamal Salih	Al-Talaba, Al-Rasheed (2)	3	1981–82, 1987–88, 1988–89
(Iraq) Thair Ahmed	Al-Talaba, Erbil (2)	3	2001–02, 2007–08, 2008–09
(Iraq) Basim Qasim	Duhok, Al-Zawraa, Al-Quwa Al-Jawiya	3	2009–10, 2015–16, 2016–17
(Egypt) Moamen Soliman	Al-Shorta	3	2021–22, 2023–24, 2024–25
(Iraq) Saadi Salih	Al-Zawraa	2	1975–76, 1976–77
(Iraq) Ammo Baba	Al-Talaba, Al-Zawraa	2	1980–81, 1993–94
(Iraq) Amer Jameel	Al-Quwa Al-Jawiya, Al-Zawraa	2	1989–90, 1998–99
(Iraq) Adnan Hamad	Al-Zawraa	2	1995–96, 1999–2000
(Iraq) Sabah Abdul-Jalil	Al-Zawraa, Al-Quwa Al-Jawiya	2	2000–01, 2004–05

== All-time table ==
The all-time Iraqi top-flight table is a cumulative record of all match results, points and goals of every club that has played in the Iraqi top division since its nationwide club era began in 1974. The table that follows is accurate as of the end of the 2025–26 season using three points for a win.

Results from the regional stage of the 1988–89 season, the qualifying rounds of the 2000–01 season, and any annulled results from other seasons are not included in the all-time table.

Teams in bold competed in the Iraq Stars League in the 2026–27 season. Numbers in bold are the highest values in each column.

Pos.	Club	Seasons	Titles	Pld	W	D	L	GF	GA	GD	Pts	PpG
1	**Al-Quwa Al-Jawiya**	**52**	8	**1,481**	**865**	376	240	2,442	1,120	+1,322	**2,971**	2.006
2	**Al-Zawraa**	51	**14**	1,452	818	398	226	**2,467**	1,089	**+1,378**	2,862	1.971
3	**Al-Shorta**	51	8	1,459	782	403	274	2,297	1,204	+1,093	2,749	1.884
4	**Al-Talaba**	51	5	1,441	712	407	322	2,135	1,257	+878	2,543	1.765
5	Al-Najaf	39	0	1,203	501	360	342	1,508	1,112	+396	1,863	1.549
6	**Al-Minaa**	48	1	1,338	452	**451**	**435**	1,395	**1,428**	−33	1,807	1.351
7	**Al-Naft**	40	0	1,246	457	407	382	1,411	1,244	+167	1,778	1.427
8	**Erbil**	34	4	1,014	379	282	353	1,281	1,263	+18	1,419	1.399
9	**Al-Karkh**	30	0	958	337	312	309	1,181	1,052	+129	1,323	1.381
10	Al-Sinaa	38	0	1,019	287	350	382	947	1,141	−194	1,211	1.188
11	Al-Jaish	31	1	782	286	229	267	869	844	+25	1,087	1.390
12	**Duhok**	22	1	632	283	191	158	833	602	+231	1,040	1.646
13	Amanat Baghdad	27	0	712	226	230	256	711	745	−34	908	1.275
14	**Karbala**	23	0	741	202	223	316	709	1,004	−295	829	1.119
15	**Al-Kahrabaa**	21	0	612	190	204	218	669	678	−9	774	1.265
16	Salahaddin	23	1	661	179	231	251	615	780	−165	768	1.162
17	Samarra	23	0	699	184	211	304	672	966	−294	763	1.092
18	**Zakho**	21	0	573	187	198	188	596	585	+11	759	1.325
19	**Al-Mosul**	20	0	628	166	202	260	562	838	−276	700	1.115
20	Naft Al-Basra	20	0	560	163	179	218	546	640	−94	668	1.193
21	**Naft Maysan**	15	0	460	136	157	167	493	543	−50	565	1.228
22	**Diyala**	15	0	497	133	146	218	469	683	−214	545	1.096
23	Al-Ramadi	14	0	462	134	140	188	505	636	−131	542	1.173
24	Al-Diwaniya	14	0	507	109	155	243	419	722	−303	482	0.951
25	Al-Shabab	14	0	362	110	126	126	353	391	−38	456	1.260
26	Naft Al-Wasat	10	1	320	110	123	87	337	306	+31	453	1.416
27	Kirkuk	19	0	543	97	148	298	418	922	−504	439	0.808
28	Al-Samawa	17	0	466	97	129	240	401	672	−271	420	0.901
29	Al-Kut	10	0	373	100	96	177	371	535	−164	396	1.062
30	Al-Nasiriya	11	0	386	93	110	183	381	613	−232	389	1.008
31	Al-Hudood	13	0	404	84	132	188	348	549	−201	384	0.950
32	Al-Rasheed	6	3	139	84	39	16	239	83	+156	291	2.094
33	Al-Tijara	14	0	289	62	93	134	212	344	−132	279	0.965
34	**Newroz**	5	0	190	73	46	71	240	223	+17	265	1.395
35	Al-Bahri	9	0	253	48	81	124	219	365	−146	225	0.889
36	Al-Difaa Al-Jawi	6	0	169	59	46	64	193	214	−21	223	1.320
37	Al-Qasim	7	0	231	48	75	108	210	341	−131	219	0.948
38	Masafi Al-Wasat	6	0	171	48	49	74	147	202	−55	193	1.129
39	Maysan	9	0	226	41	67	118	178	357	−179	190	0.841
40	Al-Khutoot	3	0	157	40	56	61	119	167	−48	176	1.121
41	Al-Umal	3	0	165	35	56	74	141	229	−88	161	0.976
42	Al-Kadhimiya	6	0	176	35	53	88	159	284	−125	158	0.898
43	Al-Sulaikh	8	0	209	32	61	116	132	293	−161	157	0.751
44	Sulaymaniya	8	0	180	36	44	100	156	325	−169	152	0.844
45	Al-Sinaat Al-Kahrabaiya	4	0	122	32	41	49	116	138	−22	137	1.123
46	Babil	7	0	178	32	36	110	143	312	−169	132	0.742
47	**Al-Karma**	2	0	76	32	25	19	96	61	+35	121	1.592
48	Pires	5	0	87	26	30	31	90	91	−1	108	1.241
49	Al-Amara	2	0	96	20	27	49	74	138	−64	87	0.906
50	Al-Kufa	3	0	74	19	26	29	69	80	−11	83	1.122
51	Al-Hussein	3	0	112	13	38	61	78	162	−84	77	0.688
52	Al-Baladiyat	3	0	53	19	16	18	55	60	−5	73	1.377
53	Sirwan	4	0	59	15	23	21	47	61	−14	68	1.153
54	Al-Etisalat	3	0	80	15	20	45	59	110	−51	65	0.813
55	Al-Shirqat	2	0	71	12	18	41	44	112	−68	54	0.761
56	Al-Hasanain	2	0	60	12	15	33	39	85	−46	51	0.850
57	**Al-Gharraf**	1	0	38	11	11	16	40	43	−3	44	1.158
58	Al-Hindiya	2	0	59	9	17	33	49	96	−47	44	0.746
59	Al-Salam	1	0	38	10	13	15	32	34	−2	43	1.132
60	Al-Naqil	1	0	18	13	3	2	47	11	+36	42	**2.333**
61	Al-Ittihad	4	0	58	10	11	37	38	89	−51	41	0.707
62	Al-Muwasalat	1	0	18	12	3	3	29	13	+16	39	2.167
63	Al-Taji	1	0	38	6	16	16	37	66	−29	34	0.895
64	Al-Shatra	3	0	40	7	9	24	31	60	−29	30	0.750
65	Al-Hilla	3	0	48	6	12	30	27	79	−52	30	0.625
66	Al-Basra	3	0	49	4	13	32	31	88	−57	25	0.510
67	Al-Shuala	2	0	38	6	5	27	28	81	−53	23	0.605
68	Peshmerga	1	0	26	5	7	14	19	31	−12	22	0.846
69	Balad	1	0	16	6	3	7	14	18	−4	21	1.313
70	Al-Furat	2	0	28	6	3	19	24	59	−35	21	0.750
71	Al-Adala	2	0	30	4	6	20	12	40	−28	18	0.600
72	Haifa	1	0	50	3	9	38	27	114	−87	18	0.360
73	Iraq U19	1	0	13	4	5	4	8	13	−5	17	1.308
74	Al-Thawra	2	0	25	4	4	17	21	46	−25	16	0.640
75	Masafi Al-Junoob	1	0	33	2	8	23	20	76	−56	14	0.424
76	Ararat	1	0	12	2	5	5	6	18	−12	11	0.917
77	Al-Rafidain	1	0	18	0	3	15	7	41	−34	3	0.167
78	Al-Adhamiya	1	0	11	0	1	10	3	29	−26	1	0.091

League or status at 2026–27:

2026–27 Iraq Stars League teams
2026–27 Iraqi Premier Division League teams
2026–27 Iraqi First Division League teams
2026–27 Iraqi Second Division League teams
2026–27 Iraqi Third Division League teams
Other teams
Defunct teams

== See also ==
- List of Iraqi football champions
- Iraqi clubs in the AFC Club Competitions
- Iraqi Women's Football League
