= 1982–83 Iraq FA Cup =

Tournament details
- Country: Iraq
- Dates: 3 December 1982 – 8 February 1983
- Teams: 45

Final positions
- Champions: Al-Jaish (2nd title)
- Runners-up: Al-Shabab

The 1982–83 Iraq FA Cup was the seventh edition of the Iraq FA Cup as a club competition. The tournament was won by Al-Jaish for the second time, beating Al-Shabab 2–1 in the final, with Hassan Farhan and Sadiq Ghanim scoring for Al-Jaish and Falah Hassan scoring for Al-Shabab. The quarter-finals saw Al-Tayaran (now known as Al-Quwa Al-Jawiya) beat Al-Zawraa 2–1 in a Baghdad Derby on 5 January 1983 with Khalid Fadhel and Hanoon Mashkoor scoring for Al-Tayaran and Thamir Yousef scoring for Al-Zawraa, before Al-Tayaran were knocked out by Al-Shabab in the semi-final 4–2 on penalties.

== Final phase ==
=== Bracket ===
First round
Al-Diwaniya (p)	2 (6)
Erbil	2 (5)

Second round 24–31 December 1982
Al-Jaish	2
Al-Tijara	1
Al-Talaba	W
Wahid Huzairan	L
Al-Amana	2
Sulaymaniya	1
Al-Najaf	L
Al-Taff	W
Al-Bahri	W
Al-Fotuwa	L
Al-Shabab (p)	0 (4)
Salahaddin	0 (3)
Al-Shorta	1 (4)
Al-Hudood (p)	1 (5)
Al-Minaa (p)	? (4)
Al-Sinaa	? (2)
Al-Tayaran	1
Al-Diwaniya	0
Al-Zawraa	W
Al-Mosul	L

Third round 31 December 1982
Al-Taff	L
Al-Bahri	W
Al-Shabab	W
Al-Hudood	L

Quarter-finals; 4–5 January 1983
Al-Jaish	1
Al-Talaba	0
Al-Amana	2
Al-Bahri	1
Al-Shabab (p)	2 (5)
Al-Minaa	2 (3)
Al-Tayaran	2
Al-Zawraa	1

Semi-finals; 10–11 January 1983
Al-Jaish	1
Al-Amana	0
Al-Shabab (p)	1 (4)
Al-Tayaran	1 (2)

Final; 8 February 1983
Al-Jaish	2
Al-Shabab	1

== Matches ==
=== Final ===
8 February 1983

Al-Jaish	2–1	Al-Shabab
Farhan; Ghanim		Hassan

Al-Shaab Stadium, Baghdad

Iraq FA Cup
1982–83 winner
Al-Jaish
2nd title
