= Iraqi football league system =

Leagues for men's football clubs in Iraq

- Country: Iraq
- Sport: Association football
- Promotion and relegation: Yes

National system
- Federation: Iraq Football Association; Iraqi Pro League Association
- Confederation: AFC
- Top division: Iraq Stars League
- Second division: Iraqi Premier Division League
- Cup competition: Iraq FA Cup; Iraqi Super Cup

The Iraqi football league system, also known as the football pyramid, is a series of interconnected leagues for men's association football clubs in Iraq. The system has a hierarchical format with promotion and relegation across leagues at different levels, allowing even the smallest club the theoretical possibility of ultimately rising to the very top of the system. There are 5 individual levels; the top flight is governed by the Iraqi Pro League Association, while the other divisions are run by the Iraq Football Association (IFA).

== History ==
Up until 1973, leagues in Iraq were played at a regional level. The Central FA League, the Basra League and the Kirkuk League were all founded in 1948, while the Mosul League was founded in 1950. The first nationwide league to be held in the country was in the 1973–74 season when the National First Division League was formed, with Al-Quwa Al-Jawiya being crowned champions. The IFA then decided to replace the competition with a new National Clubs First Division League (later known as Iraqi Premier League) which would only be open to clubs and not institute-representative teams.

In the 2023–24 season, the Iraqi Premier League was transformed into a professional league under the name Iraq Stars League.

== About the system ==
The system consists of a pyramid of leagues, bound together by the principle of promotion and relegation. A certain number of the most successful clubs in each league can rise to a higher league, whilst those that finish the season at the bottom of their league can find themselves sinking down a level. In addition to sporting performance, promotion is usually contingent on meeting criteria set by the higher league, especially concerning appropriate facilities and finances.

In theory, it is possible for a lowly local amateur club to achieve annual promotions and within a few years rise to the pinnacle of the Iraqi game and become champions of the Stars League (previously known as the Premier League). While this may be unlikely in practice (at the very least, in the short run), there certainly is significant movement within the pyramid.

== Structure ==
At the top is the single division of the Stars League (level 1, which is often referred to as the "top-flight") which contains 20 clubs, then the Premier Division League (level 2) which consists of 20 clubs, the First Division League (level 3) which consists of 20 clubs, the Second Division League (level 4) which consists of 20 clubs, and the Third Division League (level 5) which is separated into various regional tournaments before culminating in a final stage of 20 clubs.

== Promotion and relegation rules for all the levels ==
1. Stars League (level 1, 20 teams): 2 teams are relegated directly, and 1 team enters a relegation play-off.
2. Premier Division League (level 2, 20 teams): 2 teams are promoted directly, and 2 teams enter promotion play-offs. 2 teams are relegated directly, and 1 team enters a relegation play-off.
3. First Division League (level 3, 20 teams): 2 teams are promoted directly, and 1 team enters a promotion play-off. 3 teams are relegated directly.
4. Second Division League (level 4, 20 teams): 3 teams are promoted directly. 3 teams are relegated directly.
5. Third Division League (level 5): 3 teams are promoted directly.

== The system ==
Level one in the pyramid, the top division of Iraqi football, is the Stars League, the winners of which are regarded as the champions of Iraq and the contenders have access to the Asian premier football competition, the AFC Champions League Elite.

Level	League(s)/division(s)
1	Stars League; 20 clubs ↓ 2 relegation spots + 1 relegation play-off spot
2	Premier Division League; 20 clubs ↑ 2 promotion spots + 2 promotion play-off spots ↓ 2 relegation spots + 1 relegation play-off spot
3	First Division League; 20 clubs divided into 2 groups ↑ 2 promotion spots + 1 promotion play-off spot ↓ 3 relegation spots
4	Second Division League; 20 clubs divided into 2 groups ↑ 3 promotion spots ↓ 3 relegation spots
5	Third Division League; Clubs divided into 19 governorates in the first stage 20 clubs divided into 2 groups in the second stage ↑ 3 promotion spots

== See also ==
- League system
- Football in Iraq
- Iraq Football Association
- Iraqi Pro League Association
- Iraq Stars League
- Iraqi Premier Division League
- Iraqi First Division League
- Iraqi Second Division League
- Iraqi Third Division League
