= Jamal Salih =

Iraqi footballer and coach

Personal information
- Full name: Jamal Salih Hassan
- Date of birth: 1946 (age 79–80)
- Place of birth: Baghdad, Iraq
- Position: Forward

Team information
- Current team: Sharjah FC (Sports Director)

Senior career*
Years	Team	Apps	(Gls)
1968–1970	Al-Omma		
1970–1975	Al-Jamiea		

Managerial career
- 1975–1977: Al-Jamiea
- 1977: Iraq B
- 1977–1981: Baghdad XI
- 1981–1982: Al-Talaba
- 1987–1989: Al-Rasheed
- 1987–1988: Iraq U20
- 1989–1990: Al-Naft
- 2015: Iraq (Technical Consultant)
- 2018–: Sharjah FC (Sports Director)
- * Club domestic league appearances and goals

Jamal Salih Hassan (Arabic: جَمَال صَالِح حَسَن) is a former Iraq national football player and coach, and currently as a sports director for Sharjah FC, and has been in the role since March 2018.

== Career ==
He began his career as a player with Al-Omma Sports Club. He helped guide Al-Jamiea (merged with Al-Talaba in 1978) to the top division in 1970 with the likes of Qusai Abdul-Sattar and Shamil Kamil, and became head coach of the club in 1974.

He went on to coach Al-Rasheed, Al-Nafat, the Iraqi army national side and several clubs in Libya and the UAE.

Later on, he worked as a pundit for Dubai Sports channel for their Bundesliga matches.

On March 4 of 2018, Doctor Jamal Salih was appointed as the sports director of Sharjah FC, and also Salih was responsible for the sports activities in the club. Also on the same day, Sharjah FC formed a technical committee that Doctor Jamal Salih was held president of.

Salih is one of the members of achieves for Sharjah FC, a UAE Pro League in the 2018–2019 season (the first premier league for the club since 1996 in a historic success). And also the UAE Super Cup in 2019 UAE Super Cup.

== Honours As a Manager ==
Al-Talaba SC

- Iraqi Premier League: 81–82

Al-Rasheed SC

- Iraqi Premier League: 87–88

Al-Rasheed SC

- Iraqi Premier League: 88–89
