= Amer Jameel =

Iraqi association football player

Personal information
- Full name: Amer Jameel Mahdi
- Date of birth: 1 July 1945 (age 81)
- Place of birth: Iraq
- Position: Forward

International career
Years	Team	Apps	(Gls)
1966	Iraq	1	(2)

Managerial career
- 1984–1985: Iraq U17
- 1988–1991: Al-Quwa Al-Jawiya
- 1994–1995: Al-Naft
- 1997–1998: Al-Naft
- 1998–1999: Al-Zawraa
- 1999–2000: Al-Talaba

Amer Jameel Mahdi (Arabic: عَامِر جَمِيل مَهْدِيّ; born 1 July 1945) is a former Iraqi football forward who played for Iraq in 1966. He played in the 1966 Arab Nations Cup.

== Honours ==
=== Manager ===
Al-Quwa Al-Jawiya

- Iraqi Premier League: 1989–90

Al-Zawraa

- Iraqi Premier League: 1998–99
