= 1976–77 Iraqi National League =

Iraqi National League
- Season: 1976–77
- Champions: Al-Zawraa (2nd title)
- Top goalscorer: Zahrawi Jaber (6 goals)

The 1976–77 Iraqi National Clubs First Division League was the 3rd season of the competition since its foundation in 1974. Due to scheduling difficulties, the season had to be cut short during the second half of the season. The Iraq Football Association decided to annul the results from the second half of the season, using the league table at the halfway stage of the campaign (when each team had played each other once) as the final standings, and crowned Al-Zawraa as the champions for their second consecutive league title.

Al-Zawraa lost one of their games from the second half of the season 3–2 against Al-Baladiyat, and Al-Jamiea lost one of their games in the second half of the season 3–2 against Al-Zawraa, but because the second half of the season was annulled, Al-Zawraa and Al-Jamiea were both considered to have finished the season without a single loss.

== League table ==
Pos	Team	Pld	W	D	L	GF	GA	GD	Pts	Qualification
1	Al-Zawraa	11	9	2	0	24	8	+16	20	League Champions
2	Al-Jamiea	11	4	7	0	9	3	+6	15	
3	Al-Shorta	11	5	4	2	13	7	+6	14	
4	Al-Baladiyat	11	5	3	3	11	10	+1	13	
5	Al-Minaa	11	3	6	2	12	12	0	12	
6	Al-Ittihad	11	4	3	4	12	12	0	11	
7	Al-Sinaa	11	2	7	2	10	13	−3	11	
8	Al-Jaish	11	4	2	5	16	15	+1	10 (Note: Al-Jaish ranked ahead of Al-Tayaran by number of wins, due to equal points and goal difference.)	
9	Al-Tayaran	11	2	6	3	9	8	+1	10	
10	Babil	11	1	5	5	6	13	−7	7	
11	Al-Iktisad	11	1	4	6	8	13	−5	6	
12	Al-Hilla	11	0	3	8	3	19	−16	3	

Source: Ali Al-Sabti Archive

== Results ==
Home \ Away	BLD	HLL	IKT	ITT	JSH	JAM	MIN	SHR	SIN	TAY	ZWR	BBL
Al-Baladiyat		1–0	2–1	1–0	– (Note: Al-Baladiyat 1–1 Al-Jaish (annulled))	– (Note: Al-Baladiyat 0–2 Al-Jamiea (annulled))	– (Note: Al-Baladiyat 1–1 Al-Minaa (annulled))			– (Note: Al-Baladiyat 1–1 Al-Tayaran (annulled))	1–2	
Al-Hilla			1–3	0–1	0–4		0–0	– (Note: Al-Hilla 1–4 Al-Shorta (annulled))	0–1		– (Note: Al-Hilla 0–1 Al-Zawraa (annulled))	– (Note: Al-Hilla 0–0 Babil (annulled))
Al-Iktisad	– (Note: Al-Iktisad 1–0 Al-Baladiyat (annulled))			– (Note: Al-Iktisad 1–3 Al-Ittihad (annulled))	0–1	0–0	– (Note: Al-Iktisad 0–2 Al-Minaa (annulled))			0–0		1–1
Al-Ittihad			1–0		2–4	0–0		– (Note: Al-Ittihad 1–0 Al-Shorta (annulled))	2–0	– (Note: Al-Ittihad 0–1 Al-Tayaran (annulled))		1–0
Al-Jaish	3–1		– (Note: Al-Jaish 3–0 Al-Iktisad (annulled))	– (Note: Al-Jaish 0–1 Al-Ittihad (annulled))			– (Note: Al-Jaish 1–1 Al-Minaa (annulled))	1–1			– (Note: Al-Jaish 0–2 Al-Zawraa (annulled))	– (Note: Al-Jaish 1–0 Babil (annulled))
Al-Jamiea	1–0	3–0	– (Note: The Al-Jamiea–Al-Iktisad match from the second half of the season was abandoned while the score was 1–1 due to a power outage in the stadium.)		1–0			– (Note: Al-Jamiea 1–0 Al-Shorta (annulled))	1–1	1–0	– (Note: Al-Jamiea 2–3 Al-Zawraa (annulled))	0–0
Al-Minaa	0–0	– (Note: Al-Minaa 5–0 Al-Hilla (annulled))	3–2	1–1	3–0	1–1		0–0	0–0	0–3		3–0
Al-Shorta	0–1	2–0	2–1	2–1		0–0	– (Note: Al-Shorta 1–0 Al-Minaa (annulled))		4–0	2–1		– (Note: Al-Shorta 3–1 Babil (annulled))
Al-Sinaa	1–1		0–0	– (Note: Al-Sinaa 0–0 Al-Ittihad (annulled))	2–2			– (Note: Al-Sinaa 0–0 Al-Shorta (annulled))		1–1		3–1
Al-Tayaran	1–1	1–1		1–1	1–0	– (Note: Al-Tayaran 0–0 Al-Jamiea (annulled))		– (Note: Al-Tayaran 0–1 Al-Shorta (annulled))	– (Note: Al-Tayaran 2–2 Al-Sinaa (annulled))			– (Note: Al-Tayaran 7–0 Babil (annulled))
Al-Zawraa	– (Note: Al-Zawraa 2–3 Al-Baladiyat (annulled))	3–1	2–0	3–2	2–0	1–1	5–1	2–0	1–1	1–0		2–1
Babil	1–2	0–0			2–1			0–0	– (Note: Babil 1–3 Al-Sinaa (annulled))	0–0		

Source: Ali Al-Sabti Archive
Legend: Blue = home team win; Yellow = draw; Red = away team win.

== Season statistics ==
=== Top scorers ===
Pos	Scorer	Goals	Team
1	Zahrawi Jaber	6	Al-Shorta
2	Ali Kadhim	5	Al-Zawraa
3	Ahmed Subhi	4	Al-Baladiyat

=== Hat-tricks ===
Player	For	Against	Result	Date
(Iraq) Hazem Jassam	Al-Zawraa	Al-Minaa	5–1	11 March 1977
