= 1989–90 Iraqi National League =

Iraqi National League
- Season: 1989–90
- Champions: Al-Tayaran (2nd title)
- Asian Club Championship: Al-Rasheed
- Arab Club Champions Cup: Al-Zawraa
- Top goalscorer: Majeed Abdul-Ridha; Karim Saddam (13 goals each)

The 1989–90 Iraqi National Clubs First Division League was the 16th season of the competition since its foundation in 1974. The name of the league was changed from Iraqi Pan-National Clubs League back to Iraqi National Clubs League and it was organised by the Iraq Football Association (IFA). Al-Tayaran (now known as Al-Quwa Al-Jawiya) achieved their second Premier League title, having previously won the inaugural title in the 1974–75 season.

== League table ==
| Pos | Team | Pld | W | D | L | GF | GA | GD | Pts | Qualification |
|---|---|---|---|---|---|---|---|---|---|---|
| 1 | Al-Tayaran (C) | 26 | 17 | 8 | 1 | 41 | 8 | +33 | 42 | |
| 2 | Al-Rasheed | 26 | 14 | 10 | 2 | 44 | 16 | +28 | 38 | 1990–91 Asian Club Championship (Note: Although Al-Tayaran were league champions, the IFA decided to admit league runners-up Al-Rasheed into the Asian Club Championship. Al-Karkh took Al-Rasheed's place in the top division after Al-Rasheed were dissolved on 18 August 1990.) |
| 3 | Al-Shorta | 26 | 15 | 6 | 5 | 32 | 14 | +18 | 36 | |
| 4 | Al-Zawraa | 26 | 12 | 10 | 4 | 32 | 17 | +15 | 34 | 1990 Arab Club Champions Cup (Note: Al-Zawraa qualified for the Arab Club Champions Cup by winning the Iraq FA Cup.) |
| 5 | Al-Naft | 26 | 12 | 9 | 5 | 24 | 16 | +8 | 33 | |
| 6 | Al-Talaba | 26 | 12 | 7 | 7 | 32 | 19 | +13 | 31 | |
| 7 | Al-Jaish | 26 | 9 | 10 | 7 | 22 | 23 | −1 | 28 | |
| 8 | Al-Najaf | 26 | 8 | 8 | 10 | 29 | 31 | −2 | 24 | |
| 9 | Al-Sinaa | 26 | 6 | 9 | 11 | 23 | 30 | −7 | 21 | |
| 10 | Al-Shabab | 26 | 5 | 9 | 12 | 28 | 39 | −11 | 19 | |
| 11 | Al-Bahri | 26 | 5 | 9 | 12 | 18 | 35 | −17 | 19 | |
| 12 | Al-Sulaikh | 26 | 4 | 9 | 13 | 18 | 34 | −16 | 17 | |
| 13 | Samarra | 26 | 4 | 6 | 16 | 17 | 39 | −22 | 14 | |
| 14 | Erbil | 26 | 2 | 4 | 20 | 11 | 50 | −39 | 8 | |

Source: Ali Al-Sabti Archive
(C) Champions

== Results ==
| Home \ Away | BAH | JSH | NFT | NJF | RSH | SHB | SHR | SIN | SUL | TLB | TAY | ZWR | ERB | SMR |
|---|---|---|---|---|---|---|---|---|---|---|---|---|---|---|
| Al-Bahri | | 0–1 | 0–1 | 1–3 | 0–1 | 1–1 | 0–1 | 0–0 | 2–0 | 0–3 | 0–0 | 1–0 | 1–0 | 2–2 |
| Al-Jaish | 1–1 | | 0–0 | 1–0 | 0–1 | 1–1 | 0–1 | 1–1 | 1–0 | 0–1 (Note: The original Al-Jaish–Al-Talaba match was abandoned at half-time with the score at 0–0 due to attendance exceeding capacity.) | 0–2 | 1–0 | 1–0 | 1–0 |
| Al-Naft | 1–1 | 0–0 | | 0–0 | 0–2 | 2–0 | 1–1 | 1–0 | 1–0 | 1–2 | 0–2 | 1–1 | 3–1 | 1–0 |
| Al-Najaf | 1–1 | 4–1 | 0–0 | | 2–2 | 3–2 | 0–1 | 0–2 | 1–1 | 2–1 | 0–2 | 0–1 | 4–1 | 4–1 |
| Al-Rasheed | 6–1 | 2–0 | 0–1 | 3–0 | | 3–3 | 2–1 | 0–0 | 0–0 | 1–0 | 1–1 | 0–0 | 2–0 | 2–0 |
| Al-Shabab | 1–1 | 0–1 | 1–1 | 1–0 | 1–2 | | 0–3 | 0–1 | 1–2 | 0–2 | 0–3 | 1–1 | 4–0 | 4–0 |
| Al-Shorta | 2–1 | 0–0 | 2–0 | 1–1 | 0–0 | 1–0 | | 3–1 | 2–0 | 1–3 | 0–1 | 0–2 | 6–0 | 0–0 |
| Al-Sinaa | 3–1 | 1–1 | 0–2 | 0–0 | 2–1 | 0–1 | 0–1 | | 1–1 | 2–2 | 1–4 | 0–1 | 2–0 | 0–1 |
| Al-Sulaikh | 1–0 | 2–2 | 0–1 | 1–1 | 1–3 | 2–2 | 0–1 | 1–1 | | 0–2 | 0–2 | 0–0 | 3–1 | 0–0 |
| Al-Talaba | 0–0 | 1–2 | 0–1 | 3–0 | 1–1 | 2–0 | 0–1 | 1–1 | 3–2 | | 0–0 | 1–2 | 2–1 | 1–0 |
| Al-Tayaran | 2–0 | 1–0 | 2–1 | 1–0 | 1–1 | 4–0 | 0–0 | 1–0 | 3–0 | 0–0 | | 2–3 | 3–0 | 2–0 |
| Al-Zawraa | 3–0 | 2–2 | 0–0 | 3–1 | 1–1 | 2–2 | 1–0 | 2–0 | 0–1 | 0–1 | 0–0 | | 2–0 | 2–0 |
| Erbil | 0–1 | 0–2 | 0–1 | 0–1 | 0–4 | 1–1 | 0–1 | 2–1 | 1–0 | 0–0 | 1–1 | 1–2 | | 1–1 |
| Samarra | 1–2 | 2–2 | 1–3 | 0–1 | 0–3 | 0–1 | 1–2 | 2–3 | 2–0 | 1–0 | 0–1 | 1–1 | 1–0 | |

Source: Ali Al-Sabti Archive
Legend: Blue = home team win; Yellow = draw; Red = away team win.

== Season statistics ==
=== Top scorers ===
| Pos | Scorer | Goals | Team |
|---|---|---|---|
| 1 | Majeed Abdul-Ridha | 13 | Al-Shabab |
| 1 | Karim Saddam | 13 | Al-Zawraa |
| 3 | Natiq Hashim | 12 | Al-Tayaran |
| 4 | Hussein Saeed | 10 | Al-Talaba |

=== Hat-tricks ===
| Player | For | Against | Result | Date |
|---|---|---|---|---|
| (Iraq) Ahmed Radhi | Al-Rasheed | Al-Bahri | 6–1 | 24 November 1989 |
| (Iraq) Jafar Omran | Al-Naft | Samarra | 3–1 | 18 January 1990 |
