= 1981–82 Iraqi National League =

Iraqi National League
- Season: 1981–82
- Champions: Al-Talaba (2nd title)
- Relegated: Al-Ittihad
- Top goalscorer: Thamer Yousif (14 goals)

The 1981–82 Iraqi National Clubs First Division League was the 8th season of the competition since its foundation in 1974. Al-Talaba won their second league title in a row, finishing two points ahead of Al-Tayaran at the top of the table.

== League table ==
Pos	Team	Pld	W	D	L	GF	GA	GD	Pts	Qualification or relegation
1	Al-Talaba	22	14	6	2	45	18	+27	34	League Champions
2	Al-Tayaran	22	12	8	2	32	18	+14	32	
3	Al-Sinaa	22	11	5	6	20	14	+6	27	
4	Salahaddin	22	10	7	5	25	21	+4	27	
5	Al-Zawraa	22	10	5	7	33	25	+8	25	FA Cup Winners
6	Al-Shorta	22	9	5	8	29	23	+6	23	
7	Al-Amana	22	8	6	8	34	33	+1	22	
8	Al-Jaish	22	8	6	8	15	17	−2	22	
9	Al-Minaa	22	5	7	10	22	30	−8	17	
10	Al-Tijara	22	3	10	9	15	23	−8	16	
11	Al-Shabab	22	3	9	10	16	25	−9	15	
12	Al-Ittihad	22	1	2	19	8	47	−39	4	Relegated to Iraqi National Second Division

Source: Ali Al-Sabti Archive

== Results ==
Home \ Away	AMN	ITT	JSH	MIN	SHB	SHR	SIN	TLB	TAY	TJR	ZWR	SAL
Al-Amana		2–0	3–1	2–2	1–1	2–3	1–0	2–4	0–1	2–0	4–1	3–0
Al-Ittihad	2–3		0–0	0–1	2–0	0–3 (Note: Al-Ittihad withdrew from their last three matches, with their opponents (Salahaddin, Al-Shorta and Al-Tayaran) all being awarded 3–0 wins.)	0–1	0–1	0–3	0–0	1–4	0–3
Al-Jaish	1–0	3–0		1–0	1–0	0–1	1–0	1–0	0–0	1–0	0–1	1–3
Al-Minaa	1–1	2–1	1–2		1–1	1–1	1–1	0–1	0–2	3–2	3–1	2–1
Al-Shabab	0–0	5–0	1–0	0–0		2–0	1–2	1–3	0–1	1–1	0–4	0–0
Al-Shorta	4–0	4–1	0–0	2–1	1–1		1–1	1–4	2–0	0–1	2–2	1–0
Al-Sinaa	0–1	1–0	3–1	1–0	0–0	2–0		1–0	0–0	1–0	1–0	2–2
Al-Talaba	3–1	5–1	2–0	3–0	3–0	2–0	2–0		3–3	1–0	2–2	1–1
Al-Tayaran	3–3	1–0	0–0	1–0	1–0	0–3	1–0	2–2		2–1	3–1	3–0
Al-Tijara	1–1	1–0	1–1	1–1	1–1	1–0	0–1	1–1	1–3		0–0	2–2
Al-Zawraa	4–2	3–0	1–0	3–1	2–1	1–0	1–2	0–1	0–0	0–0		2–1
Salahaddin	1–0	1–0	0–0	2–1	1–0	1–0	1–0	1–1	2–2	1–0	1–0	

Source: Ali Al-Sabti Archive
Legend: Blue = home team win; Yellow = draw; Red = away team win.

== Top scorers ==
Pos	Scorer	Goals	Team
1	Thamer Yousif	14	Al-Zawraa
2	Hussein Saeed	11	Al-Talaba
2	Ghazi Hashim	11	Al-Amana
