= Al-Bahri SC =

Iraqi football club

Al-Bahri Club
- Full name: Al-Bahri Sport club
- Founded: 1976; 50 years ago
- Ground: Al-Bahri Stadium
- Capacity: 7,000
- Chairman: Alaa Saber
- Manager: Mohammed Abdul-Zahra
- League: Iraqi First Division League
- 2025–26: Iraqi Premier Division League, 19th of 20 (relegated)
Home colours	Away colours

Al-Bahri Sport Club (Arabic: نادي البحري الرياضي, lit. 'Navy Club') is an Iraqi professional football club based in Al-Jubaila, Basra. In 1990, the Iraqi Defense Ministry dissolved the club within its decision to dissolve all Iraqi military clubs, the club was playing in the Iraqi Premier League, then it was reconstituted.

== History ==
Al-Bahri were founded in 1976, and in only their second season in existence, they reached the semifinals of the 1977–78 Iraq FA Cup, beating the reigning champions at the time (Al-Zawra'a) on the way, however they withdrew from the semifinal and handed their opponents Al-Tayaran a 3–0 victory. The following season, they won the Iraqi First Division League and were promoted into the 1979–80 Iraqi National League. However, they failed to win a single match, drawing four games and losing a huge 18 matches, finishing bottom of the league and being relegated back into the lower division.

They returned to the Iraqi Premier League in the 1986–87 season by finishing in the top two of a ten-team relegation/promotion playoff. They finished eighth out of 12 teams in the league, successfully avoiding relegation for the first time in their history. In the 1987–88 Iraqi National League, Al-Bahri finished 11th out of 16 teams, and in 1988–89, they were one of the ten teams to reach the final round, eventually finishing in the top six of the league. In 1989–90, Al-Bahri finished 11th out of 14 teams. Their spell in the Iraqi Premier League would come to an end when halfway through the 1990–91 season, the Iraqi Defense Ministry dissolved the club within its decision to dissolve all Iraqi military clubs.

The club was reconstituted for the following season but never managed to make it back into the Iraqi Premier League until the 2016–17 season when they finished as runners-up in the 2015–16 Iraqi First Division League, which was enough to secure promotion.

== Managerial history ==
- (Iraq) Abdul Yemma Warwar (2016–2018)
- (Iraq) Nasser Talla Dahilan (2018)
- (Iraq) Saad Hafidh (2018–2019)
- (Iraq) Abdul Yemma Warwar (2019)
- (Iraq) Asaad Abdul Razzaq (2019–2022)
- (Iraq) Ahmed Rahim (2022–2024)
- (Iraq) Ammar Hussein (2024)
- (Iraq) Ehsan Hadi (2024–2025)
- (Iraq) Ali Wahaib Shnaiyn (2025)
- (Iraq) Nasser Talla Dahilan (2025–2026)
- (Iraq) Mohammed Abdul-Zahra (2026–)

== Honours ==
- Iraqi Premier Division League (second tier)
  - Winner (2): 1978–79, 1985–86

== Other games ==
=== Volleyball ===
The Al-Bahri volleyball team won the Iraqi volleyball League title in the 2006–07 and 2010–11 seasons. The team also participated in the AVC Club Volleyball Championship and Arab Clubs Championship as a representative of Iraq.

The U-20 volleyball team won the Iraqi volleyball League U-20 title in the 2015–16 season.
