= Ara Hamparsum =

Iraqi association football player

Personal information
- Full name: Ara Hamparsum Takwur
- Date of birth: 7 July 1952 (age 74)
- Place of birth: Iraq
- Position: Forward

Senior career*
Years	Team	Apps	(Gls)
- Al-Baladiyat
- Al-Quwa Al-Jawiya

International career
1975–1979	Iraq		
- * Club domestic league appearances and goals

Ara Hamparsum (born 7 July 1952) is a former Iraqi football forward who played for Iraq in the 1978 Asian Games.

Ara played for the national team from 1975 to 1979.
