= Iraqi Pro League Association =

Iraqi national association football organization

Iraqi Pro League Association رابطة دوري المحترفين العراقي
- Formation: 26 October 2023; 3 years ago
- Type: Sports association
- Headquarters: Zayouna, Baghdad, Iraq
- Region served: Iraq
- Members: 20 football clubs
- CEO: Matteo Mantovani
- Main organ: General Assembly

The Iraqi Pro League Association (Arabic: رابطة دوري المحترفين العراقي; IPLA) is a sports association responsible for administering the professional football league in Iraq, the Iraq Stars League. Founded in 2023, the organisation has independent legal status from the Iraq Football Association (IFA) and is autonomous in its operations. Its main role, in addition to defending its members' interests, is to organise the national league championship in conjunction with the IFA.
