= Ali Hussein Mahmoud =

Iraqi association football player

Ali Hussein
Personal information
- Full name: Ali Hussein Mahmoud
- Date of birth: January 1, 1953 (age 73)
- Place of birth: Iraq
- Position: Forward

Senior career*
Years	Team	Apps	(Gls)
- Kuliya Al-Shorta
	Al-Shorta		(58)
- Al-Jaish SC

International career
1975–1980	Iraq		
- * Club domestic league appearances and goals

Ali Hussein Mahmoud (Arabic: عَلِيّ حُسَيْن مَحْمُود; born 1 January 1953) is a former Iraqi football striker who played for Iraq in the 1976 AFC Asian Cup qualification. He played for the national team between 1975 and 1980.

Ali Hussein was topscorer of the Iraqi League in 1979-80 and in 1983-84.

== Career statistics ==
=== International goals ===
Scores and results list Iraq's goal tally first.

No.	Date	Venue	Opponent	Score	Result	Competition
1.	18 December 1978	Rajamangala Stadium, Bangkok	Kuwait	1–0	3–0	1978 Asian Games
2.	19 December 1978	Rajamangala Stadium, Bangkok	India	1–0	3–0	1978 Asian Games
