= Karim Saddam =

Iraqi footballer (born 1960)

Personal information
- Full name: Karim Saddam Menshid
- Date of birth: 26 May 1960 (age 66)
- Place of birth: Iraq
- Position: Forward

Senior career*
Years	Team	Apps	(Gls)
1979–1983	Al-Sinaa		
1983–1985	Al-Jaish		
1985–1986	Al-Rasheed		
1986-1987	Al-Jaish		
1987–1993	Al-Zawra'a SC		
1993–1994	Racing Club Beirut		
1994–1995	Al-Shorta		
1995–1996	Al-Sinaa		

International career
1982–1986	Iraq	20	(6)

Managerial career
- 2007: Al-Zawraa
- 2007–2008: Al-Talaba
- 2011: Al-Zawraa
- * Club domestic league appearances and goals

Karim Saddam Menshid (Arabic: كَرِيم صَدَّام مُنْشِد; born 26 May 1960) is an Iraqi football forward who played for Iraq in the 1986 FIFA World Cup. He also played for many Iraqi clubs : Al Sinaa, Al Jaish, Al-Rasheed, Al Zawraa, Racing Club Beirut & Al Shorta. Saddam was top scorer of Iraqi League for four times. He scored unforgettable goal against UAE in 1986 FIFA World Cup Qualification which secured Iraq to go throw to the next stage.

== Career ==
Saddam was born and brought in Sadr City in Baghdad and started his career with Al-Sinaa in 1979 before moving to Al-Jaish and Al-Rasheed.

In 1983, he made his international debut against Egypt and played in the 1984 Olympics in Los Angeles.

On 27 September 1985 in Taif, Saudi Arabia, Saddam scored his most important international goal, when he scored in the last seconds of the game against the United Arab Emirates, after coming on as a substitute only a few minutes previously in the 2nd round World Cup qualifier, had the score-line stayed the same before Saddam had come on and scored, Iraq would have been eliminated but Saddam's goal made the game 2–1 to the Emirates, helping Iraq to a win on the away goals rule after Iraq had beaten the UAE 3–2, only a seven days before in Dubai.

Iraq later went on to beat Syria and qualified for the World Cup finals in Mexico, where Saddam started two games against Belgium and Mexico.

== Career statistics ==
=== International goals ===
Scores and results list Iraq's goal tally first.

No	Date	Venue	Opponent	Score	Result	Competition
1.	27 September 1985	King Fahd Stadium, Taif	United Arab Emirates	1–2	1–2	1986 FIFA World Cup qualification
