= Rahim Hameed =

Iraqi footballer

Abdul-Rahim Hameed Aufi
Personal information
- Full name: Abdul-Rahim Hameed Aufi
- Date of birth: 23 May 1963 (age 63)
- Place of birth: Iraq
- Position: Forward

Senior career*
| Years | Team | Apps | (Gls) |
- Al-Talaba
- Al-Jaish

International career
| 1986–1988 | Iraq | | (4) |

Managerial career
- 2014: Iraq U20
- 2015–2018: Iraq (assistant)
- 2019–2021: Iraq (assistant)
- * Club domestic league appearances and goals

Abdul-Rahim Hameed Aufi (Arabic: عَبْد الرَّحِيم حَمِيد عَوْفِيّ; born 23 May 1963), or simply known as Rahim Hameed, is an Iraqi football forward who played for Iraq in the 1986 FIFA World Cup. He also played for Al-Jaish.

Rahim Hameed was a prolific goalscorer who was leading goalscorer in the Iraqi league for three consecutive seasons from 1985 to 1987.

After becoming joint leading scorer with nine goals alongside Ahmed Radhi and Hussein Saeed, he was called into Iraq’s World Cup squad by Brazilian coach Evaristo de Macedo for the final tournament in Mexico.

== Career statistics ==
=== International goals ===
Scores and results list Iraq's goal tally first.

| No | Date | Venue | Opponent | Score | Result | Competition |
|---|---|---|---|---|---|---|
| 1. | 6 April 1986 | Bahrain National Stadium, Riffa | Oman | 1–0 | 3–2 | 8th Arabian Gulf Cup |
| 2. | 6 April 1986 | Bahrain National Stadium, Riffa | Oman | 2–0 | 3–2 | 8th Arabian Gulf Cup |
| 3. | 6 April 1986 | Bahrain National Stadium, Riffa | Oman | 3–0 | 3–2 | 8th Arabian Gulf Cup |
| 4. | 23 September 1986 | Daegu Stadium, Daegu | Pakistan | 2–1 | 5–1 | 1986 Asian Games |
