= Salahaddin SC =

Iraqi football club

- Full name: Salahaddin Football Club
- Nicknames: Fursan Al-Ayyubi (Knights of Al-Ayyubi)
- Founded: 1975; 51 years ago
- Ground: Tikrit Stadium
- Capacity: 10,000
- Manager: Hadi Mutnash
- League: Iraqi Third Division League
Home colours	Away colours

Salahaddin SC (Arabic: نادي صلاح الدين) is an Iraqi football team based in Tikrit.

== Honours ==
=== National ===
- Iraq Stars League
  - Champions (1): 1982–83

=== Friendly ===
- Al-Wehdat Championship
  - Winners (1): 1983
- Rovers Cup
  - Winners (1): 1982

== Notable head coaches ==
- (Iraq) Wathik Naji
- (Iraq) Douglas Aziz
- (Iraq) Basim Qasim
