= Al-Sinaa SC =

Iraqi football club

- Full name: Al-Sinaa Sports club
- Nicknames: Masnaa Al-Nujoom (Stars Factory)
- Founded: 1965; 61 years ago (as Kahrabaa Al-Wusta)
- Ground: Al-Sinaa Stadium
- Capacity: 10,000
- Chairman: Ammar Abdullah Al-Janabi
- Manager: Safwan Abdul-Ghani
- League: Iraqi First Division League
- 2024–25: Iraqi Premier Division League, 19th of 20 (relegated)
Home colours	Away colours

Al-Sinaa Sports Club (Arabic: نادي الصناعة الرياضي, lit. 'Industry Sports Club') is a football club based in Thawra District, East Districts of the Tigris River, Baghdad, that plays in Iraqi First Division League.

== History ==
=== Premier League Play Overview ===
Al-Sinaa started playing in the Iraqi Premier League since the start of the championship in the 1974–75 season, and lasted for 23 consecutive seasons, before being relegated to the Iraqi First Division League in the 1997–98 season. The team returned to play in the Premier League in the 2001–02 season, and, in the 2010–11 season, got third place in the league, but was relegated to the Iraqi First Division League again in the 2012–13 season. It returned in the 2015–16 season, but was relegated from the league in the same season after it fell to the bottom of the standings in its group.

=== 2020–21 season ===
After qualifying for the preliminary round, Al-Sinaa played in the 2020–21 Iraqi First Division League, 13 matches without losing, winning 11, drawing 2, gaining 35 points and taking first place in Group 2, and qualified for the Iraqi Premier League, led by coach Sadeq Hanoon. In the final match, the team beat Newroz 1–0 to become the champion of the Iraqi First Division League.

== Managerial history ==
- (Iraq) Qusay Munir (2018–2019)
- (Iraq) Sadeq Hanoon (2020–2022)
- (Iraq) Tahsin Fadhel 2022)
- (Iraq) Khalid Mohammed Sabbar (2022–2023)
- (Iraq) Qusay Munir (2023–2024)
- (Iraq) Safwan Abdul-Ghani (2024-)

== Honours ==
=== Domestic ===
- Iraqi Premier Division League (second tier)
  - Winners (1): 2020–21
- Iraq FA Cup
  - Winners (1): 1983–84
