= Al-Jaish SC (Iraq) =

Iraqi football club

- Full name: Al-Jaish Sports Club
- Nicknames: Masnaa Al-Abtal (Hero Factory)
- Founded: 18 August 1974; 52 years ago
- Ground: Al Jaish Stadium
- Capacity: 6,000
- Chairman: Osama Al-Sakni
- Manager: Maher Ohkla
- League: Iraqi Premier Division League
- 2025–26: Iraqi Premier Division League, 5th of 20
Home colours	Away colours

Al-Jaish Sports Club (Arabic: نادي الجيش الرياضي, lit. 'Army Sports Club') is an Iraqi sports club based in Baghdad. The football team has won the Iraq Stars League once in its history, back in 1984. The club was founded in 1974.

== Honours ==
=== Domestic ===
- Iraq Stars League
  - Winners (1): 1983–84
  - Runners-up (2): 1986–87, 1987–88
- Iraq FA Cup
  - Winners (2): 1979–80, 1982–83
  - Runners-up (4): 1978–79, 1986–87, 1990–91, 1994–95
- Iraqi Second Division League (third tier)
  - Winners (1): 2023–24

=== Friendly ===
- Al-Qadisiya Championship
  - Winners (2): 1983, 1984
- Marah Halim Cup
  - Winners (1): 1984
  - Third place (1): 1983
- Rovers Cup
  - Winners (1): 1983
- Military Friendship Championship
  - Winners (1): 1980

== Famous head coaches ==
- (Iraq) Munzir Al-Waaiz
- (Iraq) Hakeem Shaker
- (Poland) Wojciech Przybylski

== Other sports ==
=== Basketball ===
- Iraqi Basketball Premier League:
  - Champions (2): 1979–80, 1983–84
