= List of Arab Club Champions Cup finals =

- Founded: 1981
- Region: UAFA (Arab world)
- Teams: 37
- Current champions: (Saudi Arabia) Al-Nassr (1st title)
- Most championships: (Iraq) Al-Rasheed (Tunisia) Espérance de Tunis (3 titles each)
- 2023 Arab Club Champions Cup

The Arab Club Champions Cup is an association football competition established in 1981 for top clubs of the 22 Union of Arab Football Associations member associations.

A total of 20 clubs have won the Arab Club Champions Cup. The first ever winners of the tournament were Iraqi club Al-Shorta. Iraqi club Al-Rasheed and Tunisian club Espérance de Tunis share the record for most titles, with three each. Al-Rasheed are the only team to have won three consecutive titles. Saudi Arabian clubs Al-Hilal and Al-Ittihad have been runners-up the most times, each losing three finals. Syrian club Al-Jaish and Jordanian club Al-Faisaly are the only teams to have reached two finals without winning the trophy. Saudi Arabia has provided the most champions, with nine wins from six clubs. The current champions are Al-Nassr, who beat Al-Hilal 2–1 after extra time in the 2023 final.

== List of finals ==
Key
Match was won during extra time
Match was won on away goals
Match was won on a penalty shoot-out

List of Arab Club Champions Cup finals
List of Arab Club Champions Cup finals - home & away legs (1981–1982)
Year	Country	Team 1	Score	Team 2	Country	Venue	Attendance
1981–82	Iraq	Al-Shorta	2–0	Al-Nejmeh	Lebanon	Al-Shaab Stadium, Baghdad	
1981–82	Lebanon	Al-Nejmeh	2–2	Al-Shorta	Iraq	Al-Shaab Stadium, Baghdad^{[note]}	
1981–82	Al-Shorta won 4–2 on aggregate						
List of Arab Club Champions Cup finals - one leg (1984–2001)
1984	Saudi Arabia	Al-Ettifaq	^{n/a}	KAC Kénitra	Morocco	Prince Mohamed bin Fahd Stadium, Dammam	
1985	Iraq	Al-Rasheed	^{n/a}	USM El-Harrach	Algeria	Al-Shaab Stadium, Baghdad	
1986	Iraq	Al-Rasheed	^{n/a}	Espérance de Tunis	Tunisia	Stade El Menzah, Tunis	
1987	Iraq	Al-Rasheed	2–1 (aet)	Al-Ittihad Jeddah	Saudi Arabia	Prince Faisal bin Fahd Stadium, Riyadh	
1988	Saudi Arabia	Al-Ettifaq	1–1 (aet) (4–2 p)	Club Africain	Tunisia	Sharjah Stadium, Sharjah	27,500
1989	Morocco	Wydad Casablanca	3–1	Al-Hilal	Saudi Arabia	Stade El Harti, Marrakesh	
1990	Cancelled during preliminary round						
1992	Saudi Arabia	Al-Shabab	2–0 (aet)	Al-Arabi	Qatar	Khalifa International Stadium, Doha	
1993	Tunisia	Espérance de Tunis	3–0	Al-Muharraq	Bahrain	Stade El Menzah, Tunis	
1994	Saudi Arabia	Al-Hilal	0–0 (aet) (4–3 p)	Al-Ittihad Jeddah	Saudi Arabia	King Fahd International Stadium, Riyadh	
1995	Saudi Arabia	Al-Hilal	1–0	Espérance de Tunis	Tunisia	King Fahd International Stadium, Riyadh	70,000
1996	Egypt	Al-Ahly	3–1	Raja Casablanca	Morocco	Cairo International Stadium, Cairo	
1997	Tunisia	Club Africain	2–1 (aet)	Al-Ahly	Egypt	Stade El Menzah, Tunis	45,000
1998	Algeria	WA Tlemcen	3–1	Al-Shabab	Saudi Arabia	Prince Abdullah al-Faisal Stadium, Jeddah	
1999	Saudi Arabia	Al-Shabab	2–0	Al-Jaish	Syria	Cairo International Stadium, Cairo	5,000
2000	Tunisia	CS Sfaxien	2–1 (aet)	Al-Jaish	Syria	Prince Abdullah al-Faisal Stadium, Jeddah	
2001	Qatar	Al-Sadd	3–1	MC Oran	Algeria	Khalifa International Stadium, Doha	20,000
List of Arab Unified Club Championship finals (2002–2003)
2002	Saudi Arabia	Al-Ahli Saudi	1–0	Club Africain	Tunisia	Prince Abdullah al-Faisal Stadium, Jeddah	
2003	Egypt	Zamalek	2–1	Al-Kuwait	Kuwait	Cairo International Stadium, Cairo	
List of Arab Champions League finals - one leg (2003–2004)
2003–04	Tunisia	CS Sfaxien	0–0 (aet) (4–3 p)	Ismaily	Egypt	Camille Chamoun Stadium, Beirut	
List of Arab Champions League finals - home & away legs (2004–2009)
2004–05	Tunisia	CS Sfaxien	1–2	Al-Ittihad Jeddah	Saudi Arabia	Stade Taïeb Mhiri, Sfax	
2004–05	Saudi Arabia	Al-Ittihad Jeddah	2–0	CS Sfaxien	Tunisia	Prince Abdullah al-Faisal Stadium, Jeddah	26,000
2004–05	Al-Ittihad Jeddah won 4–1 on aggregate						
2005–06	Egypt	ENPPI	1–2	Raja Casablanca	Morocco	Osman Ahmed Osman Stadium, Cairo	20,000
2005–06	Morocco	Raja Casablanca	1–0	ENPPI	Egypt	Stade Mohamed V, Casablanca	85,000
2005–06	Raja Casablanca won 3–1 on aggregate						
2006–07	Algeria	ES Sétif	1–1	Al-Faisaly	Jordan	Stade 8 Mai 1945, Sétif	30,000
2006–07	Jordan	Al-Faisaly	0–1	ES Sétif	Algeria	King Abdullah Stadium, Amman	20,000
2006–07	ES Sétif won 2–1 on aggregate						
2007–08	Morocco	Wydad Casablanca	0–1	ES Sétif	Algeria	Stade Mohamed V, Casablanca	90,000
2007–08	Algeria	ES Sétif	1–0	Wydad Casablanca	Morocco	Stade 8 Mai 1945, Sétif	30,000
2007–08	ES Sétif won 2–0 on aggregate						
2008–09	Morocco	Wydad Casablanca	0–1	Espérance de Tunis	Tunisia	Stade Mohamed V, Casablanca	90,000
2008–09	Tunisia	Espérance de Tunis	1–1	Wydad Casablanca	Morocco	Stade Olympique de Radès, Radès	
2008–09	Espérance de Tunis won 2–1 on aggregate						
List of UAFA Club Cup finals (2012–2013)
2012–13	Kuwait	Al-Arabi	0–0	USM Alger	Algeria	Sabah Al-Salem Stadium, Kuwait City	23,456
2012–13	Algeria	USM Alger	3–2	Al-Arabi	Kuwait	Stade 5 Juillet 1962, Algiers	50,000
2012–13	USM Alger won 3–2 on aggregate						
List of Arab Club Championship finals (2017)
2017	Tunisia	Espérance de Tunis	3–2 (aet)	Al-Faisaly	Jordan	Alexandria Stadium, Alexandria	7,500
List of Arab Club Champions Cup finals (2018–present)
2018–19	Tunisia	Étoile du Sahel	2–1	Al-Hilal	Saudi Arabia	Hazza bin Zayed Stadium, Al-Ain	15,000
2019–20	Morocco	Raja Casablanca	4–4 (4–3 p)	Al-Ittihad	Saudi Arabia	Moulay Abdellah Stadium, Rabat	0 (closed doors)
2023	Saudi Arabia	Al-Nassr	2–1 (aet)	Al-Hilal	Saudi Arabia	King Fahd Sports City, Taif	20,000

Notes

^note Both games were played in Baghdad as matches could not be held in Lebanon due to the Lebanese Civil War.
^n/a A round-robin tournament determined the final standings.

== Performances ==
=== By club ===
Performances in the Arab Club Champions Cup by club
Club	Title(s)	Runners-up	Seasons won	Seasons runner-up
(Tunisia) Espérance de Tunis	3	2	1993, 2009, 2017	1986, 1995
(Iraq) Al-Rasheed	3	0	1985, 1986, 1987	—
(Saudi Arabia) Al-Hilal	2	3	1994, 1995	1989, 2019, 2023
(Saudi Arabia) Al-Shabab	2	1	1992, 1999	1998
(Tunisia) Club Sfaxien	2	1	2000, 2004	2005
(Morocco) Raja Casablanca	2	1	2006, 2020	1996
(Saudi Arabia) Al-Ettifaq	2	0	1984, 1988	—
(Algeria) ES Sétif	2	0	2007, 2008	—
(Saudi Arabia) Al-Ittihad	1	3	2005	1987, 1994, 2020
(Morocco) Wydad Casablanca	1	2	1989	2008, 2009
(Tunisia) Club Africain	1	2	1997	1988, 2002
(Egypt) Al Ahly	1	1	1996	1997
(Iraq) Al-Shorta	1	0	1982	—
(Algeria) WA Tlemcen	1	0	1998	—
(Qatar) Al-Sadd	1	0	2001	—
(Saudi Arabia) Al-Ahli	1	0	2002	—
(Egypt) Zamalek	1	0	2003	—
(Algeria) USM Alger	1	0	2013	—
(Tunisia) Étoile du Sahel	1	0	2019	—
(Saudi Arabia) Al-Nassr	1	0	2023	—
(Syria) Al-Jaish	0	2	—	1999, 2000
(Jordan) Al-Faisaly	0	2	—	2007, 2017
(Lebanon) Nejmeh	0	1	—	1982
(Morocco) KAC Kénitra	0	1	—	1984
(Algeria) USM El-Harrach	0	1	—	1985
(Qatar) Al-Arabi	0	1	—	1992
(Bahrain) Al-Muharraq	0	1	—	1993
(Algeria) MC Oran	0	1	—	2001
Al-Kuwait	0	1	—	2003
(Egypt) Al-Ismaily	0	1	—	2004
(Egypt) ENPPI Club	0	1	—	2006
(Kuwait) Al-Arabi	0	1	—	2013

=== By nation ===
Performances in finals by nation
Nation	Titles	Runners-up
Saudi Arabia	9	7
Tunisia	7	5
Algeria	4	2
Iraq	4	0
Morocco	3	4
Egypt	2	3
Qatar	1	1
Jordan	0	2
Kuwait	0	2
Syria	0	2
Bahrain	0	1
Lebanon	0	1

=== By continent ===
Performances in finals by continent
Continent	Titles	Runners-up
Africa	16	14
Asia	14	16
