= List of Iraq Stars League winning managers =

The following is a list of association football managers who have won the Iraq Stars League, the top level of the Iraqi football league system, since its establishment in 1974.

== Winning managers ==
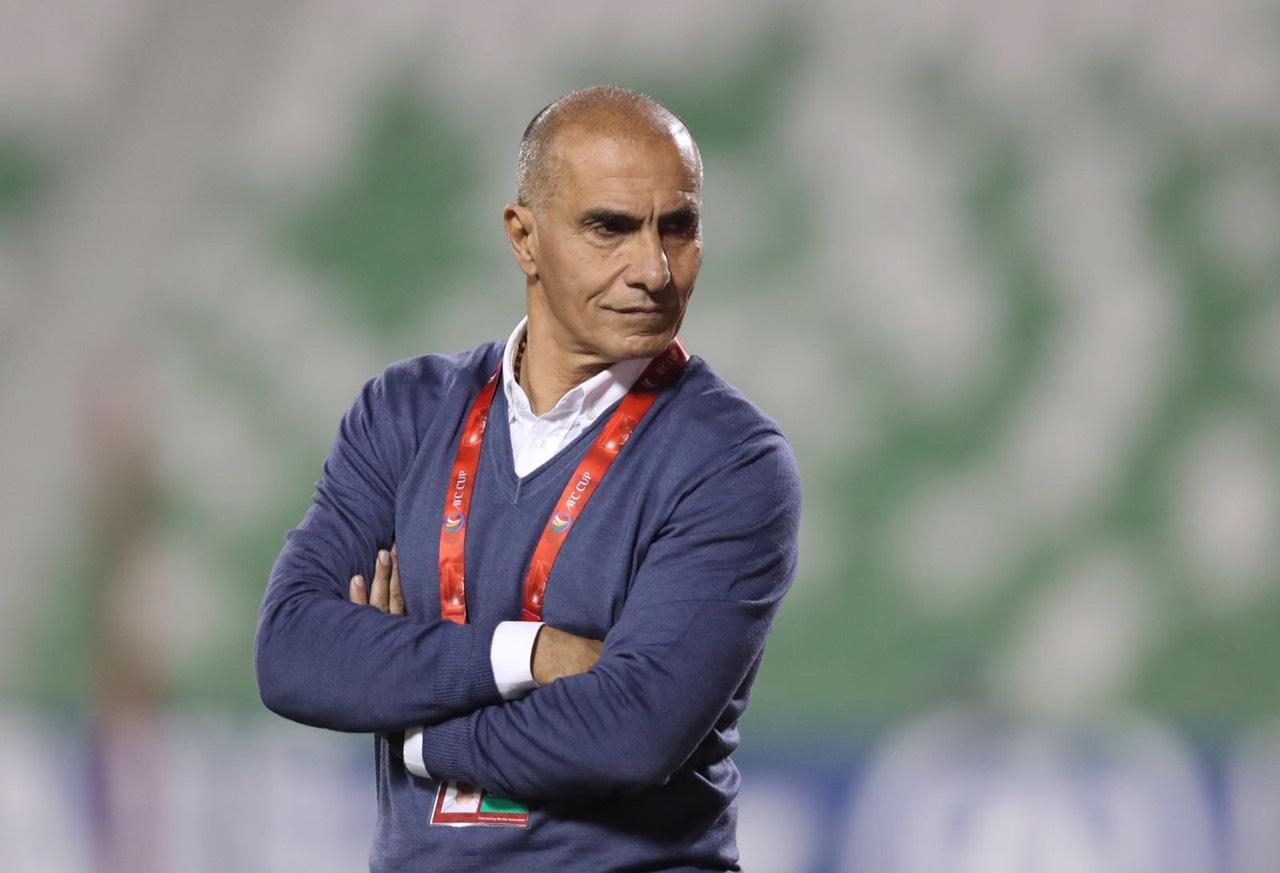
Ayoub Odisho is the most successful manager in Iraq Stars League history, having won four league titles coaching Al-Talaba, Al-Quwa Al-Jawiya and Al-Zawraa.

Key

†	Winning manager also won Iraq FA Cup in the same season, completing the Iraqi domestic Double.

Season	Manager		Club (Titles)	Ref.
Season	Name (Titles)	Nationality	Club (Titles)	Ref.
1974–75 (1st)	Abdelilah Mohammed Hassan	IRQ	Al-Tayaran (1)	
1975–76 (2nd)	Saadi Salih †	IRQ	Al-Zawraa (1)	
1976–77 (3rd)	Saadi Salih (2)	IRQ	Al-Zawraa (2)	
1977–78 (4th)	Jamil Hanoon	IRQ	Al-Minaa (1)	
1978–79 (5th)	Anwar Jassam †	IRQ	Al-Zawraa (3)	
1979–80 (6th)	Douglas Aziz	IRQ	Al-Shorta (1)	
1980–81 (7th)	Ammo Baba	IRQ	Al-Talaba (1)	
1981–82 (8th)	Jamal Salih	IRQ	Al-Talaba (2)	
1982–83 (9th)	Wathiq Naji	IRQ	Salahaddin (1)	
1983–84 (10th)	Munthir Al-Waadh	IRQ	Al-Jaish (1)	
1984–85 (11th)	Cancelled due to FIFA World Cup qualification			
1985–86 (12th)	Yahya Alwan	IRQ	Al-Talaba (3)	
1986–87 (13th)	Nasrat Nassir †	IRQ	Al-Rasheed (1)	
1987–88 (14th)	Jamal Salih (2) †	IRQ	Al-Rasheed (2)	
1988–89 (15th)	Jamal Salih (3)	IRQ	Al-Rasheed (3)	
1989–90 (16th)	Amer Jameel	IRQ	Al-Tayaran (2)	
1990–91 (17th)	Falah Hassan †	IRQ	Al-Zawraa (4)	
1991–92 (18th)	Adil Yousef †	IRQ	Al-Quwa Al-Jawiya (3)	
1992–93 (19th)	Ayoub Odisho	IRQ	Al-Talaba (4)	
1993–94 (20th)	Ammo Baba (2) †	IRQ	Al-Zawraa (5)	
1994–95 (21st)	Hadi Mutanash †	IRQ	Al-Zawraa (6)	
1995–96 (22nd)	Adnan Hamad †	IRQ	Al-Zawraa (7)	
1996–97 (23rd)	Ayoub Odisho (2) †	IRQ	Al-Quwa Al-Jawiya (4)	
1997–98 (24th)	Abdelilah Abdul-Hameed	IRQ	Al-Shorta (2)	
1998–99 (25th)	Amer Jameel (2) †	IRQ	Al-Zawraa (8)	
1999–2000 (26th)	Adnan Hamad (2) †	IRQ	Al-Zawraa (9)	
2000–01 (27th)	Sabah Abdul-Jalil	IRQ	Al-Zawraa (10)	
2001–02 (28th)	Thair Ahmed †	IRQ	Al-Talaba (5)	
2002–03 (29th)	Cancelled due to the Iraq War			
2003–04 (30th)	Cancelled due to scheduling and security issues			
2004–05 (31st)	Sabah Abdul-Jalil (2)	IRQ	Al-Quwa Al-Jawiya (5)	
2005–06 (32nd)	Salih Radhi	IRQ	Al-Zawraa (11)	
2006–07 (33rd)	Akram Salman	IRQ	Erbil (1)	
2007–08 (34th)	Thair Ahmed (2)	IRQ	Erbil (2)	
2008–09 (35th)	Thair Ahmed (3)	IRQ	Erbil (3)	
2009–10 (36th)	Basim Qasim	IRQ	Duhok (1)	
2010–11 (37th)	Radhi Shenaishil	IRQ	Al-Zawraa (12)	
2011–12 (38th)	Nizar Mahrous	SYR	Erbil (4)	
2012–13 (39th)	Thair Jassam	IRQ	Al-Shorta (3)	
2013–14 (40th)	Ended prematurely without awarding title			
2014–15 (41st)	Abdul-Ghani Shahad	IRQ	Naft Al-Wasat (1)	
2015–16 (42nd)	Basim Qasim (2)	IRQ	Al-Zawraa (13)	
2016–17 (43rd)	Basim Qasim (3)	IRQ	Al-Quwa Al-Jawiya (6)	
2017–18 (44th)	Ayoub Odisho (3)	IRQ	Al-Zawraa (14)	
2018–19 (45th)	Nebojša Jovović	MNE	Al-Shorta (4)	
2019–20 (46th)	Cancelled due to the COVID-19 pandemic			
2020–21 (47th)	Ayoub Odisho (4) †	IRQ	Al-Quwa Al-Jawiya (7)	
2021–22 (48th)	Moamen Soliman	EGY	Al-Shorta (5)	
2022–23 (49th)	Ahmed Salah	IRQ	Al-Shorta (6)	
2023–24 (50th)	Moamen Soliman (2) †	EGY	Al-Shorta (7)	
2024–25 (51st)	Moamen Soliman (3)	EGY	Al-Shorta (8)	
2025–26 (52nd)	Rashid Jaber	OMA	Al-Quwa Al-Jawiya (8)	

== Multiple winners ==
Rank	Manager	Titles	Club(s)	Winning years
1	(Iraq) Ayoub Odisho	4	Al-Quwa Al-Jawiya (2), Al-Talaba (1), Al-Zawraa (1)	1993, 1997, 2018, 2021
2	(Iraq) Basim Qasim	3	Al-Quwa Al-Jawiya (1), Al-Zawraa (1), Duhok (1)	2010, 2016, 2017
2	(Iraq) Jamal Salih	3	Al-Rasheed (2), Al-Talaba (1)	1982, 1988, 1989
2	(Iraq) Thair Ahmed	3	Erbil (2), Al-Talaba (1)	2002, 2008, 2009
2	(Egypt) Moamen Soliman	3	Al-Shorta (3)	2022, 2024, 2025
6	(Iraq) Adnan Hamad	2	Al-Zawraa (2)	1996, 2000
6	(Iraq) Amer Jameel	2	Al-Tayaran (1), Al-Zawraa (1)	1990, 1999
6	(Iraq) Ammo Baba	2	Al-Talaba (1), Al-Zawraa (1)	1981, 1994
6	(Iraq) Saadi Salih	2	Al-Zawraa (2)	1976, 1977
6	(Iraq) Sabah Abdul-Jalil	2	Al-Quwa Al-Jawiya (1), Al-Zawraa (1)	2001, 2005

== Winners by nationality ==
Country	Managers	Titles
Iraq	27	41
Egypt	1	3
Montenegro	1	1
Oman	1	1
Syria	1	1
Total	31	47
