= 1988–89 Iraqi Pan-National League =

Iraqi Pan-National League
- Season: 1988–89
- Champions: Al-Rasheed (3rd title)
- Relegated: Al-Minaa; Al-Nasr; Wahid Huzairan; Al-Tijara; Al-Mosul; Diyala; Al-Nasiriya; Salahaddin; Al-Jamahir; Al-Samawa; Duhok; Babil; Al-Hurriya; Sulaymaniya; Al-Diwaniya; Al-Numaniya
- Asian Club Championship: Al-Rasheed
- Arab Club Champions Cup: Al-Tayaran
- Arab Cup Winners' Cup: Al-Rasheed
- Top goalscorer: Karim Saddam (22 goals)

The 1988–89 Iraqi Pan-National Clubs First Division League was the 15th season of the competition since its foundation in 1974 and the first that was played in a group stage format rather than a round-robin format. The name of the league was changed from Iraqi National Clubs League to Iraqi Pan-National Clubs League. Al-Rasheed won the title by defeating Al-Talaba on penalties in the final, to become the first team to win three Premier League titles in a row.

During the regional stage, if a match ended in a draw, it would go to extra time and then penalties if necessary. A team would earn three points if they won a game by two goals or more after normal time, two points if they won a game by one goal or in extra time, and one point if they won a penalty shootout.

== Regional stage ==
=== North Group ===
| Team | Result |
|---|---|
| Erbil | Qualified to National Stage |
| Wahid Huzairan | Qualified to National Stage |
| Al-Mosul | Relegated to Iraqi National Second Division |
| Salahaddin | Relegated to Iraqi National Second Division |
| Duhok | Relegated to Iraqi National Second Division |
| Sulaymaniya | Relegated to Iraqi National Second Division |

=== Central Group ===
| Team | Result |
|---|---|
| Al-Najaf | Qualified to National Stage |
| Al-Nasr | Qualified to National Stage |
| Diyala | Relegated to Iraqi National Second Division |
| Al-Jamahir | Relegated to Iraqi National Second Division |
| Babil | Relegated to Iraqi National Second Division |
| Al-Diwaniya | Relegated to Iraqi National Second Division |

=== South Group ===
| Team | Result |
|---|---|
| Al-Bahri | Qualified to National Stage |
| Al-Minaa | Qualified to National Stage |
| Al-Nasiriya | Relegated to Iraqi National Second Division |
| Al-Samawa | Relegated to Iraqi National Second Division |
| Al-Hurriya | Relegated to Iraqi National Second Division |
| Al-Numaniya | Relegated to Iraqi National Second Division |

=== Baghdad Group ===
| Pos | Team | Pld | W | PW | L | GF | GA | GD | BP | Pts | Qualification or relegation |
|---|---|---|---|---|---|---|---|---|---|---|---|
| 1 | Al-Zawraa | 20 | 14 | 3 | 3 | 38 | 21 | +17 | 8 | 39 | Qualified to National Stage |
| 2 | Al-Rasheed | 20 | 14 | 1 | 5 | 34 | 13 | +21 | 8 | 37 | Qualified to National Stage |
| 3 | Al-Tayaran | 20 | 11 | 4 | 5 | 40 | 29 | +11 | 5 | 31 | Qualified to National Stage |
| 4 | Al-Talaba | 20 | 11 | 2 | 7 | 30 | 21 | +9 | 4 | 28 | Qualified to National Stage |
| 5 | Al-Shorta | 20 | 9 | 3 | 8 | 17 | 16 | +1 | 0 | 21 | |
| 6 | Al-Jaish | 20 | 8 | 1 | 11 | 29 | 26 | +3 | 3 | 20 | |
| 7 | Al-Shabab | 20 | 5 | 3 | 12 | 19 | 28 | −9 | 2 | 15 | |
| 8 | Al-Sulaikh | 20 | 2 | 6 | 12 | 16 | 28 | −12 | 2 | 12 | |
| 9 | Al-Sinaa | 20 | 5 | 0 | 15 | 12 | 23 | −11 | 1 | 11 | |
| 10 | Al-Naft | 20 | 5 | 0 | 15 | 18 | 30 | −12 | 0 | 10 | |
| 11 | Al-Tijara | 20 | 3 | 0 | 17 | 21 | 39 | −18 | 1 | 7 | Relegated to Iraqi National Second Division |

Source: Ali Al-Sabti Archive
Rules for classification: 1 bonus point was awarded for each game won by 2 or more goals in normal time.

==== Results ====
| Home \ Away | JSH | NFT | RSH | SHB | SHR | SIN | SUL | TLB | TAY | TJR | ZWR |
|---|---|---|---|---|---|---|---|---|---|---|---|
| Al-Jaish | | 2–2 (Note: Al-Jaish won 4–2 on penalties.) | 1–3 | 2–0 | 1–2 | 0–1 | 2–0 | 4–4 (Note: 3–3 after normal time; 4–4 after extra time; Al-Talaba won 5–4 on penalties.) | 0–0 (Note: Al-Tayaran won 3–2 on penalties.) | 1–0 | 1–2 |
| Al-Naft | 1–2 | | 2–1 | 0–2 | 0–0 (Note: Al-Shorta won 6–5 on penalties.) | 1–0 | 1–1 (Note: Al-Sulaikh won 4–3 on penalties.) | 0–4 | 1–2 | 3–2 (Note: 2–2 after normal time; 3–2 to Al-Naft after extra time.) | 0–2 |
| Al-Rasheed | 1–1 (Note: Al-Rasheed won 5–3 on penalties.) | 2–0 | | 2–1 | 2–0 | 2–0 | 4–0 | 2–0 | 2–1 | 1–0 | 1–1 (Note: Al-Zawraa won 3–2 on penalties.) |
| Al-Shabab | 0–1 | 2–1 | 1–1 (Note: Al-Shabab won 5–4 on penalties.) | | 0–1 | 0–0 (Note: Al-Shabab won 4–3 on penalties.) | 1–0 | 2–0 | 2–3 | 3–2 | 0–1 |
| Al-Shorta | 1–2 | 1–1 (Note: Al-Shorta won 4–3 on penalties.) | 1–0 | 1–0 | | 1–0 (Note: 0–0 after normal time; 1–0 to Al-Shorta after extra time.) | 0–0 (Note: Al-Sulaikh won 4–3 on penalties.) | 1–0 (Note: 0–0 after normal time; 1–0 to Al-Shorta after extra time.) | 1–0 | 1–0 | 2–2 (Note: Al-Zawraa won 4–2 on penalties.) |
| Al-Sinaa | 0–2 | 2–1 | 0–2 | 1–1 (Note: Al-Shabab won 3–1 on penalties.) | 1–0 | | 2–0 | 1–1 (Note: Al-Talaba won 4–3 on penalties.) | 1–2 | 1–0 | 0–2 |
| Al-Sulaikh | 1–1 (Note: Al-Sulaikh won 6–5 on penalties.) | 0–1 | 0–1 | 2–0 | 1–1 (Note: Al-Shorta won 4–3 on penalties.) | 1–1 (Note: Al-Sulaikh won 3–1 on penalties.) | | 1–1 (Note: Al-Sulaikh won 5–4 on penalties.) | 0–1 | 1–1 (Note: Al-Sulaikh won 3–2 on penalties.) | 2–3 |
| Al-Talaba | 1–0 | 2–0 | 1–2 | 3–1 | 3–2 (Note: 2–2 after normal time; 3–2 to Al-Talaba after extra time.) | 1–0 | 1–0 | | 1–0 | 2–1 | 2–1 (Note: 1–1 after normal time; 2–1 to Al-Talaba after extra time.) |
| Al-Tayaran | 4–2 | 2–2 (Note: Al-Tayaran won 5–4 on penalties.) | 3–2 | 2–2 (Note: Al-Tayaran won 6–5 on penalties.) | 2–0 | 2–0 | 2–5 | 1–0 | | 7–2 | 3–1 |
| Al-Tijara | 2–3 | 0–1 | 0–1 | 2–0 | 0–1 | 2–1 | 2–1 | 0–3 | 1–1 (Note: Al-Tayaran won 5–4 on penalties.) | | 3–4 |
| Al-Zawraa | 1–1 (Note: Al-Zawraa won 7–6 on penalties.) | 1–0 | 0–2 | 3–1 | 1–0 | 2–0 | 2–0 | 2–0 | 3–2 | 3–1 | |

Source: Ali Al-Sabti Archive
Legend: Blue = home team win; Yellow = draw; Red = away team win.

== National stage ==
=== Group 1 ===
| Pos | Team | Pld | W | D | L | GF | GA | GD | Pts | Qualification or relegation | ZWR | TLB | ERB | MIN | NSR |
|---|---|---|---|---|---|---|---|---|---|---|---|---|---|---|---|
| 1 | Al-Zawraa | 4 | 4 | 0 | 0 | 11 | 3 | +8 | 8 | Qualified to Semi-finals | | 3–1 | 3–1 | 2–1 | 3–0 |
| 2 | Al-Talaba | 4 | 3 | 0 | 1 | 9 | 4 | +5 | 6 | Qualified to Semi-finals | | | 3–0 | | 3–0 |
| 3 | Erbil | 4 | 1 | 1 | 2 | 2 | 6 | −4 | 3 | | | | | 1–0 | |
| 4 | Al-Minaa | 4 | 1 | 0 | 3 | 4 | 6 | −2 | 2 | Relegated to Iraqi National Second Division | | 1–2 | | | 2–1 |
| 5 | Al-Nasr | 4 | 0 | 1 | 3 | 1 | 8 | −7 | 1 | Relegated to Iraqi National Second Division | | | 0–0 | | |

Source: Ali Al-Sabti Archive

=== Group 2 ===
| Pos | Team | Pld | W | D | L | GF | GA | GD | Pts | Qualification or relegation | TAY | RSH | BHR | NJF | WHZ |
|---|---|---|---|---|---|---|---|---|---|---|---|---|---|---|---|
| 1 | Al-Tayaran | 4 | 4 | 0 | 0 | 10 | 2 | +8 | 8 | Qualified to Semi-finals | | | 2–0 | 3–0 | 3–1 |
| 2 | Al-Rasheed | 4 | 2 | 1 | 1 | 10 | 3 | +7 | 5 | Qualified to Semi-finals | 1–2 | | 4–0 | 5–1 | 0–0 |
| 3 | Al-Bahri | 4 | 1 | 1 | 2 | 5 | 7 | −2 | 3 | | | | | 1–1 | 4–0 |
| 4 | Al-Najaf | 4 | 1 | 1 | 2 | 3 | 9 | −6 | 3 | | | | | | 1–0 |
| 5 | Wahid Huzairan | 4 | 0 | 1 | 3 | 1 | 8 | −7 | 1 | Relegated to Iraqi National Second Division | | | | | |

Source: Ali Al-Sabti Archive

=== Ranking of fourth-placed teams ===
The Iraq Football Association decided that the league for the 1989–90 season would consist of ten clubs from Baghdad and four clubs from outside Baghdad. Therefore, the three lowest-placed teams from outside Baghdad in the national stage were relegated.

| Pos | Grp | Team | Pld | W | D | L | GF | GA | GD | Pts | Relegation |
|---|---|---|---|---|---|---|---|---|---|---|---|
| 1 | Grp 2 | Al-Najaf | 4 | 1 | 1 | 2 | 3 | 9 | −6 | 3 | |
| 2 | Grp 1 | Al-Minaa | 4 | 1 | 0 | 3 | 4 | 6 | −2 | 2 | Relegated to Iraqi National Second Division |

Source: Ali Al-Sabti Archive

== Golden stage ==
Semi-finals
26 April 1989
Al-Zawraa | 1 (2)
Al-Rasheed (p) | 1 (4)
26 April 1989
Al-Tayaran | 1 (5)
Al-Talaba (p) | 1 (6)

Final
28 April 1989
Al-Rasheed (p) | 1 (5)
Al-Talaba | 1 (4)
Third place
27 April 1989
Al-Tayaran | 4
Al-Zawraa | 1

=== Semi-finals ===
26 April 1989

| Al-Zawraa | 1–1 (a.e.t.) | Al-Rasheed |
|---|---|---|
| Hamza | | Radhi |
Penalties
| K. Saddam (penalty scored); Hamza (penalty scored); Naji (penalty missed); Abid Nader (penalty missed) | 2–4 | (penalty missed) Hashim; (penalty scored) L. Hussein; (penalty scored) Karim Allawi; (penalty scored) Qais; (penalty scored) N. Saddam |

Al-Shaab Stadium, Baghdad
26 April 1989

| Al-Tayaran | 1–1 (a.e.t.) | Al-Talaba |
|---|---|---|
| Abdul-Kadhim | | Saeed |
Penalties
| Khalil Allawi (penalty scored); Kareem (penalty scored); Mahdi Jassim (penalty scored); E. Jassim (penalty scored); Mohammed Jassim (penalty scored); Hadi (penalty missed); Abdul-Kadhim (penalty missed) | 5–6 | (penalty scored) Saeed; (penalty scored) Mutashar; (penalty scored) Makki; (penalty scored) Resan; (penalty scored) Mohammed; (penalty missed) Jeayer; (penalty scored) Yaseen |

Al-Kashafa Stadium, Baghdad

=== Third place match ===
27 April 1989

| Al-Tayaran | 4–1 | Al-Zawraa |
|---|---|---|
| H. Ibrahim; Khalil Allawi; M. Ibrahim | | Khalil |

Al-Shaab Stadium, Baghdad

=== Final ===
28 April 1989

| Al-Rasheed | 1–1 (a.e.t.) | Al-Talaba |
|---|---|---|
| Abdul-Abbas | | A. Hussein |
Penalties
| N. Saddam (penalty missed); Karim Allawi (penalty scored); Qais (penalty scored); L. Hussein (penalty scored); Hashim (penalty scored); Abdul-Abbas (penalty missed); Jabbar (penalty scored) | 5–4 | (penalty scored) Mohammed; (penalty scored) Mutashar; (penalty scored) Makki; (penalty scored) Resan; (penalty missed) Saeed; (penalty missed) Salih; (penalty missed) Saber |

Al-Shaab Stadium, Baghdad

== Qualification to AFC and UAFA competitions ==
| Team | Qualification method | Competition(s) qualified to |
|---|---|---|
| Al-Rasheed | League champions | 1989–90 Asian Club Championship and 1989 Arab Cup Winners' Cup (Note: Although Al-Rasheed were the league champions and not the FA Cup winners, the IFA decided to admit them into the Arab Cup Winners' Cup rather than the Arab Club Champions Cup.) |
| Al-Tayaran | FA Cup runners-up (Note: As FA Cup winners Al-Zawraa participated in the 1989 Arab Cooperation Council Club Championship, runners-up Al-Tayaran were chosen to participate in the Arab Club Champions Cup.) | 1989 Arab Club Champions Cup |

== Season statistics ==
=== Top scorers ===
| Pos | Scorer | Goals | Team |
|---|---|---|---|
| 1 | Karim Saddam | 22 | Al-Zawraa |
| 2 | Natiq Hashim | 12 | Al-Tayaran |
| 2 | Hussein Saeed | 12 | Al-Talaba |
| 2 | Saad Abdul-Raheem | 12 | Al-Zawraa |

=== Hat-tricks ===
| Player | For | Against | Result | Date |
|---|---|---|---|---|
| (Iraq) Mohammed Jassim | Al-Tayaran | Al-Tijara | 7–2 | 11 October 1988 |
| (Iraq) Natiq Hashim^{4} | Al-Tayaran | Al-Jaish | 4–2 | 7 November 1988 |
| (Iraq) Saad Abdul-Raheem | Al-Zawraa | Al-Sulaikh | 3–2 | 2 March 1989 |

Notes

^{4} Player scored 4 goals
