= Arab Club Champions Cup =

- Organiser(s): UAFA
- Founded: 1981; 45 years ago
- Region: Arab world
- Teams: 37
- Current champions: (Saudi Arabia) Al-Nassr (1st title)
- Most championships: (Iraq) Al-Rasheed (Tunisia) Espérance de Tunis (3 titles each)
- Website: uafa-ac.com
- 2023 Arab Club Champions Cup

The Arab Club Champions Cup (Arabic: كأس العرب للأندية الأبطال, French: Ligue des Champions Arabe) is a club football competition organised by the Union of Arab Football Associations (UAFA) and contested by top clubs from the Arab world. The tournament is contested by a total of 37 teams from Asia and Africa.

Founded in 1981, the tournament was held alongside the Arab Cup Winners' Cup and the Arab Super Cup throughout the 1990s and early 2000s, until the Cup Winners' Cup and Super Cup were merged with the Champions Cup in 2002. The tournament's first champions were Iraqi club Al-Shorta, who defeated Lebanese side Nejmeh in the final over two legs in 1982.

Saudi Arabian clubs have accumulated the most victories, with nine wins. The title has been won by 20 clubs, eight of which have won the title more than once. Since the tournament was merged with the Cup Winners' Cup, only ES Sétif of Algeria have managed consecutive wins, successfully defending their title in 2008. Iraqi club Al-Rasheed and Tunisian side Espérance de Tunis share the record for most titles, with three each. The reigning champions are Al-Nassr of Saudi Arabia, who won their first title in 2023.

The next two editions of the tournament will be held in 2027 (from 21 July to 7 August) and in 2029 (from 25 July to 11 August).

== History ==
List of winners
Season	Winners
Arab Club Champions Cup
1981–82	(Iraq) Al-Shorta
1984	(Saudi Arabia) Al-Ettifaq
1985	(Iraq) Al-Rasheed
1986	(Iraq) Al-Rasheed (2)
1987	(Iraq) Al-Rasheed (3)
1988	(Saudi Arabia) Al-Ettifaq (2)
1989	(Morocco) Wydad Casablanca
1990	Cancelled
1992	(Saudi Arabia) Al-Shabab
1993	(Tunisia) Espérance de Tunis
1994	(Saudi Arabia) Al-Hilal
1995	(Saudi Arabia) Al-Hilal (2)
1996	(Egypt) Al Ahly
1997	(Tunisia) Club Africain
1998	(Algeria) WA Tlemcen
1999	(Saudi Arabia) Al-Shabab (2)
2000	(Tunisia) Club Sfaxien
2001	(Qatar) Al-Sadd
Arab Unified Club Championship
2002	(Saudi Arabia) Al-Ahli Saudi
2003	(Egypt) Zamalek
Arab Champions League
2003–04	(Tunisia) Club Sfaxien (2)
2004–05	(Saudi Arabia) Al-Ittihad Jeddah
2005–06	(Morocco) Raja Casablanca
2006–07	(Algeria) ES Sétif
2007–08	(Algeria) ES Sétif (2)
2008–09	(Tunisia) Espérance de Tunis (2)
UAFA Club Cup
2012–13	(Algeria) USM Alger
Arab Club Championship
2017	(Tunisia) Espérance de Tunis (3)
Arab Club Champions Cup
2018–19	(Tunisia) Étoile du Sahel
2019–20	(Morocco) Raja Casablanca (2)
2023	(Saudi Arabia) Al-Nassr

The Union of Arab Football Associations (UAFA) decided to create a competition for champions of Arab countries after the end of the 1979–80 season. Domestic champions from UAFA's member nations were invited to compete, but after several withdrawals, only three teams from Iraq, Lebanon and Jordan ended up participating. The competition kicked off on 19 June 1981 with Lebanese champions Nejmeh beating Jordanian champions Al-Ahli 2–1. Nejmeh's Jamal Al-Khatib was the scorer of the first Arab Club Champions Cup goal. Nejmeh and Al-Shorta competed in the inaugural final in February 1982, with Al-Shorta winning 4–2 on aggregate at Al-Shaab Stadium in Baghdad to be crowned the first champions of the Arab world.

The tournament was not held the following year but returned in 1984 in a round-robin format, and Al-Ettifaq earned the first title for a Saudi Arabian club that year. With the number of participants increasing every year, UAFA introduced preliminary qualifying rounds that preceded the final round-robin tournament, before they changed the format of the final tournament in 1987 to one that consisted of a group stage followed by a knockout stage. UAFA also started to allow countries to have more than one participant in 1987, with two Saudi Arabian clubs (Al-Ittihad and Al-Hilal) and two Iraqi clubs (Al-Rasheed and Al-Jaish) competing. Al-Rasheed of Iraq dominated the competition during these years, becoming the first team to win three consecutive championships in 1985, 1986 and 1987, while Al-Ettifaq won their title back in 1988. From 1981 to 1988, no team from the Confederation of African Football (CAF) was able to win the tournament and all winners were from the Asian Football Confederation (AFC).

An African club became champions of the Arab world for the first time in 1989 as Wydad Casablanca of Morocco beat Saudi Arabia's Al-Hilal in the final. That same year, UAFA founded a new annual competition that would be held alongside the Arab Club Champions Cup; it was called the Arab Cup Winners' Cup and was a competition for the cup winners of Arab countries, with a similar format to that of the Champions Cup. In 1995, UAFA introduced the Arab Super Cup which was an annual round-robin competition between the winners and runners-up of both the Champions Cup and Cup Winners' Cup. From 1989 until 2001, there were six winners from CAF and five from the AFC. Four of the eleven winners during this time were from Saudi Arabia, while Espérance de Tunis earned the first win for a Tunisian team in 1993, Al-Ahly became the first Egyptian champions in 1995, WA Tlemcen earned Algeria's first title in 1998 and Al-Sadd won the first title for a Qatari club in 2001.

In 2002, UAFA made a decision that changed the face of Arab club football. With the increasing number of commitments facing Arab clubs in the modern era, UAFA decided to merge the Cup Winners' Cup and Super Cup with the Champions Cup to form the Arab Unified Club Championship, which would be the only UAFA club tournament. Two editions of the tournament were played under this name, with Al-Ahli of Saudi Arabia winning in 2002 and Zamalek winning in 2003. After the 2003 edition, ART became the tournament's sponsor and UAFA then changed the name of the tournament to the Arab Champions League so that its name was similar to other elite club tournaments such as the UEFA Champions League, CAF Champions League, AFC Champions League and OFC Champions League. Tunisia's Club Sfaxien became the first winners of the Champions League era. From the 2004–05 edition onwards, UAFA reintroduced two-legged finals, which had not been used since the first edition of the tournament.

After title wins for Saudi Arabia's Al-Ittihad and Morocco's Raja Casablanca, ES Sétif of Algeria became the first back-to-back winners in the Champions League era by claiming both the 2006–07 and 2007–08 titles. After the 2008–09 edition won by Espérance de Tunis of Tunisia, UAFA ran into organisational problems due to issues with the tournament's new sponsor. This prevented the tournament from being held for four years until it resurfaced in 2012–13 under the new name of UAFA Club Cup, with Algeria's USM Alger earning their first title. However, UAFA then ran into the same problems as before which led to another four-year hiatus. The competition was held again in 2017 under the name of Arab Club Championship with 20 competing teams; the group stage and knockout stage were held in Egypt and the final was held as a single leg. Espérance de Tunis were crowned champions making them the joint-most successful team in the competition's history.

The number of teams doubled to 40 for the 2018–19 season where the competition was renamed to Arab Club Champions Cup and its format was changed. The 2023 edition of the tournament was widely covered by international media due to the participation of a number of high-profile players such as Cristiano Ronaldo, Karim Benzema and N'Golo Kanté following their transfers to Saudi Pro League clubs. Out of the thirteen champions crowned from 2002 to 2023, ten of them were from Africa and only three were from Asia.

== Branding ==
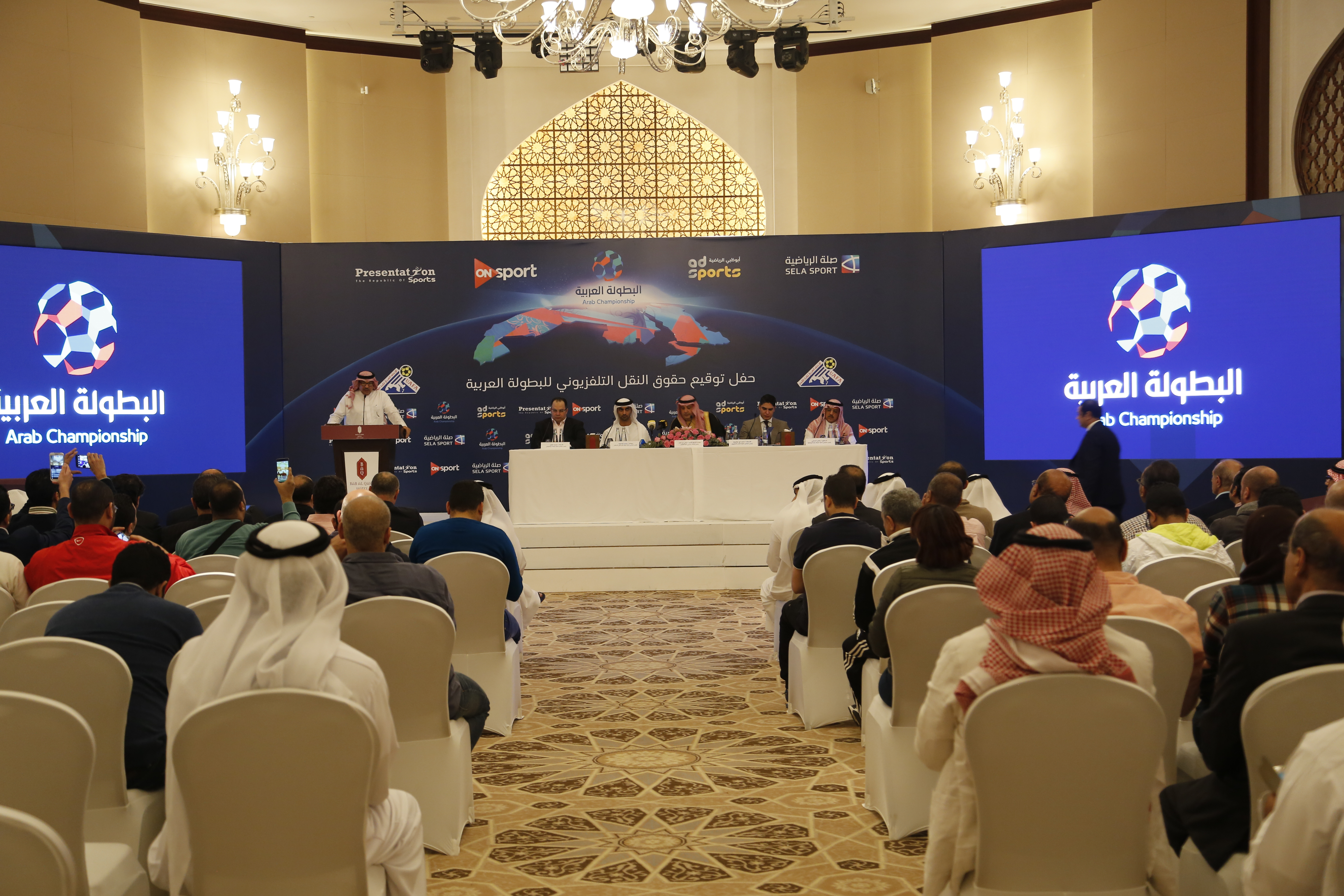
The signing ceremony for the TV broadcasting rights for the 2017 edition.

Since the 2018–19 season, the competition has been named Arab Club Champions Cup, while each edition of the tournament also has its own special name based on the host nation of the tournament or host of the final match. The 2019 final was hosted in the United Arab Emirates, therefore the 2018–19 edition was named the Zayed Champions Cup to mark 100 years since the birth of the late Sheikh Zayed bin Sultan Al Nahyan, the founder of the United Arab Emirates. The 2020 final was hosted in Morocco, therefore the 2019–20 edition was named the Mohammed VI Champions Cup after Mohammed VI of Morocco. The 2023 edition of the tournament was hosted in Saudi Arabia from the group stage onwards, and was thus named King Salman Club Cup after Salman of Saudi Arabia.

The logo of the Arab Club Champions Cup is a white circle with a grey outline, featuring navy, red, purple and green patterning with a navy diamond in the centre bearing the words Arab Champions in Arabic. The name of the competition in both English and Arabic features underneath the logo. The logo is adapted slightly for each edition of the tournament to reflect the name and host nation of that specific edition.

== Prize money ==
As of 2023, the fixed amount of prize money paid to participating clubs is as follows:

Prize money
Winners	$6,000,000
Runners-up	$2,500,000
Semi-finalists	$200,000
Quarter-finalists	$150,000
Group stage	$100,000
Qualifying rounds	$20,000

== Team records and statistics ==
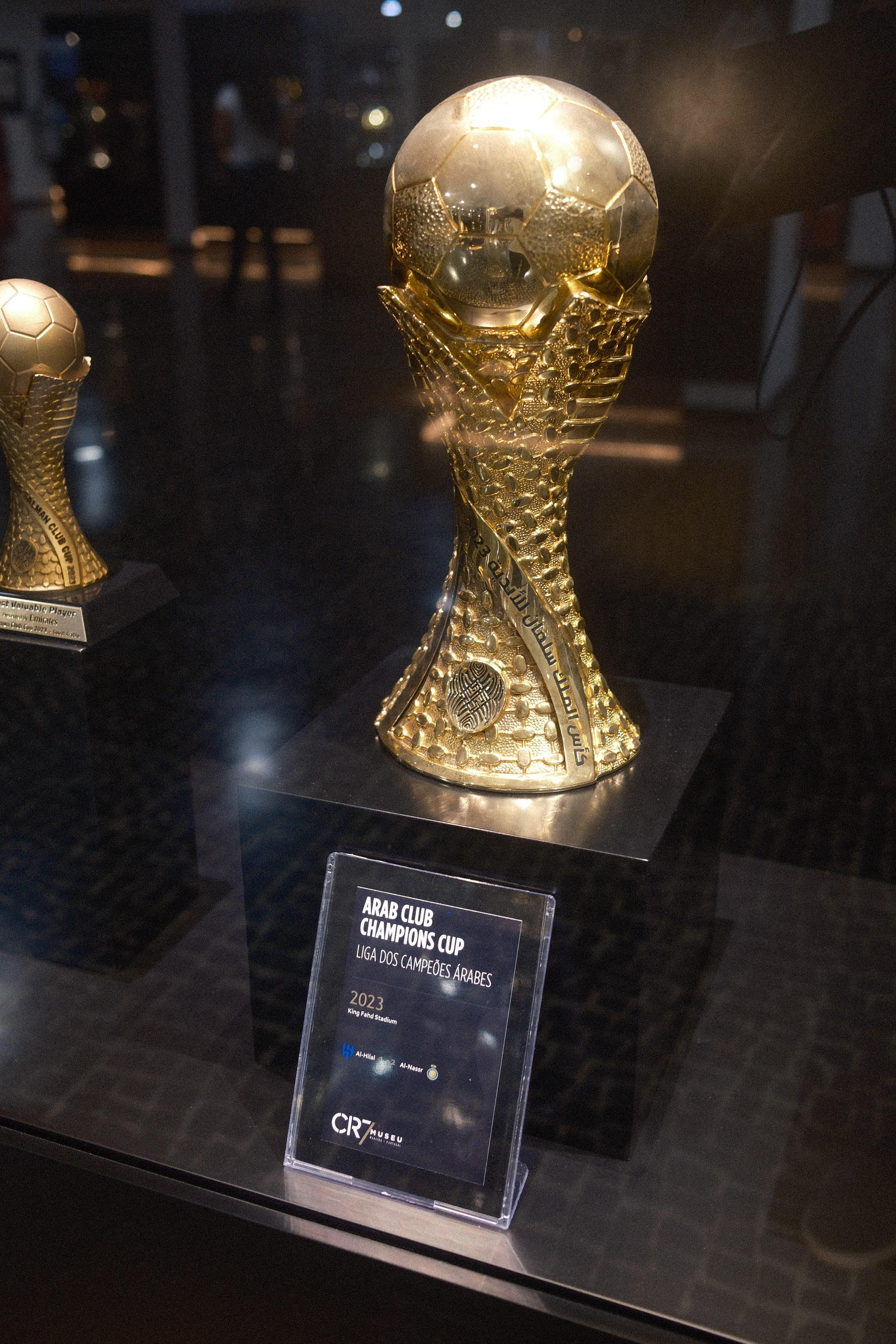
Trophy of the 2023 Arab Club Champions Cup.

=== Performance by club ===
Performances in the Arab Club Champions Cup by club
Club	Title(s)	Runners-up	Seasons won	Seasons runner-up
(Tunisia) Espérance de Tunis	3	2	1993, 2009, 2017	1986, 1995
(Iraq) Al-Rasheed	3	0	1985, 1986, 1987	—
(Saudi Arabia) Al-Hilal	2	3	1994, 1995	1989, 2019, 2023
(Saudi Arabia) Al-Shabab	2	1	1992, 1999	1998
(Tunisia) Club Sfaxien	2	1	2000, 2004	2005
(Morocco) Raja Casablanca	2	1	2006, 2020	1996
(Saudi Arabia) Al-Ettifaq	2	0	1984, 1988	—
(Algeria) ES Sétif	2	0	2007, 2008	—
(Saudi Arabia) Al-Ittihad	1	3	2005	1987, 1994, 2020
(Morocco) Wydad Casablanca	1	2	1989	2008, 2009
(Tunisia) Club Africain	1	2	1997	1988, 2002
(Egypt) Al Ahly	1	1	1996	1997
(Iraq) Al-Shorta	1	0	1982	—
(Algeria) WA Tlemcen	1	0	1998	—
(Qatar) Al-Sadd	1	0	2001	—
(Saudi Arabia) Al-Ahli	1	0	2002	—
(Egypt) Zamalek	1	0	2003	—
(Algeria) USM Alger	1	0	2013	—
(Tunisia) Étoile du Sahel	1	0	2019	—
(Saudi Arabia) Al-Nassr	1	0	2023	—
(Syria) Al-Jaish	0	2	—	1999, 2000
(Jordan) Al-Faisaly	0	2	—	2007, 2017
(Lebanon) Nejmeh	0	1	—	1982
(Morocco) KAC Kénitra	0	1	—	1984
(Algeria) USM El-Harrach	0	1	—	1985
(Qatar) Al-Arabi	0	1	—	1992
(Bahrain) Al-Muharraq	0	1	—	1993
(Algeria) MC Oran	0	1	—	2001
Al-Kuwait	0	1	—	2003
(Egypt) Al-Ismaily	0	1	—	2004
(Egypt) ENPPI Club	0	1	—	2006
(Kuwait) Al-Arabi	0	1	—	2013

=== Performances by nation ===
Performances in finals by nation
Nation	Titles	Runners-up
Saudi Arabia	9	7
Tunisia	7	5
Algeria	4	2
Iraq	4	0
Morocco	3	4
Egypt	2	3
Qatar	1	1
Jordan	0	2
Kuwait	0	2
Syria	0	2
Bahrain	0	1
Lebanon	0	1

=== Performances by continent ===
Performances in finals by continent
Continent	Titles	Runners-up
Africa	16	14
Asia	14	16

== Player records ==
=== Most goals ===
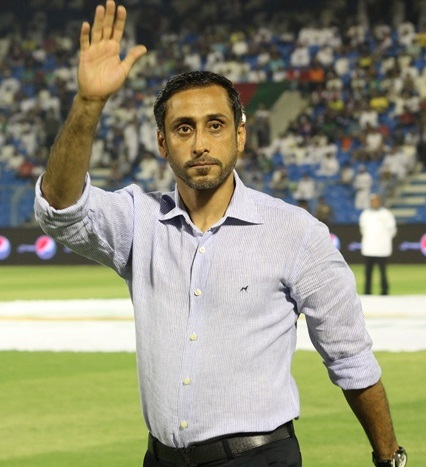
Sami Al-Jaber is the all-time top scorer of the competition.

Players who are still active are highlighted in boldface.

Rank	Nation	Player	Goals
1	(Saudi Arabia)	Sami Al-Jaber	26
2	(Saudi Arabia)	Talal Al-Meshal	16
2	(Tunisia)	Haykel Guemamdia	16
4	(Tunisia)	Zoubair Essafi	14
5	(Egypt)	Abdel Halim Ali	13
6	(Morocco)	Mustapha Bidoudane	12
6	(Saudi Arabia)	Saad Al-Harthi	12
6	(Saudi Arabia)	Hamzah Idris	12
9	(Brazil)	**Romarinho**	11
10	(Algeria)	Abdelmalek Ziaya	10
10	(Jordan)	Hassouneh Al-Sheikh	10
10	(Jordan)	Mahmoud Shelbaieh	10
10	(Saudi Arabia)	Essa Al-Mehyani	10
10	(Brazil)	Sérgio Ricardo	10
10	(Sudan)	**Mohamed Abdelrahman**	10
16	(Algeria)	Lamouri Djediat	9
16	(Morocco)	Salaheddine Bassir	9
16	(Morocco)	Soufiane Alloudi	9
16	(Saudi Arabia)	Mohammed Noor	9
16	(Saudi Arabia)	Waleed Al-Gizani	9
16	(Saudi Arabia)	Yousuf Al-Thunayan	9
16	(Morocco)	Bouchaib El Moubarki	9
16	(Mali)	Tenema N'Diaye	9
16	(Senegal)	Papa Malick Ba	9
16	(Iraq)	Ahmed Salah Alwan	9
16	(Bahrain)	Talal Yousef	9
16	(Egypt)	Ahmed Abdel Moneim	9
28	(Egypt)	Gamal Hamza	8
28	(Senegal)	Issa Aidara	8
28	(Ivory Coast)	Rémi Adiko	8
28	(Algeria)	Noureddine Daham	8
28	(Iraq)	Haris Mohammed	8
28	(Iraq)	Ahmed Radhi	8
28	(Morocco)	Mohamed Madihi	8

== See also ==
- Arab Cup Winners' Cup
- Arab Super Cup
- GFF Gulf Club Champions League
- GFF Gulf Club Super Cup
- FIFA Arab Cup
