= Anad Abid =

Iraqi football midfielder

Personal information
- Full name: Anad Abid Tweresh
- Date of birth: 3 August 1955 (age 71)
- Place of birth: Iraq
- Position: Forward

Senior career*
Years	Team	Apps	(Gls)
1976−1977	Al-Iktisad		
1977−1982	Al-Amana		
1982−1984	Salahaddin		
1984−1986	Al-Rasheed		
1986−1987	Al-Zawraa		
1987−1988	Salahaddin		
1988−1989	Al-Naft		
1989−1993	Al-Amana		
1993−1995	Al-Umal		
1995−1996	Al-Khutoot		

International career
1985–1986	Iraq	11	(0)
- * Club domestic league appearances and goals

Anad Abid Tweresh (born 3 August 1955) is an Iraqi former football forward who played for the national team, including making appearances in the 1986 FIFA World Cup.

== Honours ==
=== Club ===
Al-Zawraa

- Iraqi Premier League:
  - Winner: 1982–83

Al-Rasheed

- Arab Club Champions Cup:
  - Winner: 1985
