= 1987 Arab Club Champions Cup =

بطولة الأندية العربية لأبطال الدوري 1987

Tournament details
- Host country: Saudi Arabia
- City: Riyadh
- Dates: 21 October – 3 November
- Teams: 10 (from 1 association)
- Venue: (in 1 host city)

Final positions
- Champions: (Iraq) Al-Rasheed (3rd title)
- Runners-up: (Saudi Arabia) Al-Ittihad
- Third place: (Algeria) JE Tizi Ouzou
- Fourth place: (Egypt) Tersana

Tournament statistics
- Matches played: 20
- Goals scored: 51 (2.55 per match)
- Top scorer: (Iraq) Haris Mohammed (7 goals)
- Best player: (Saudi Arabia) Saleh Nu'eimeh
- Best goalkeeper: (Iraq) Abdul-Fatah Nasif
- Fair play award: Palestine SC

== Participants ==
Participants
| Zone | Team | Qualifying method |
|---|---|---|
| | (Saudi Arabia) Al-Ittihad | Hosts |
| | (Iraq) Al-Rasheed | Holders |
| Zone 1 | (Qatar) Al-Arabi | Q-League representative |
| Zone 2 | (Egypt) Tersana | 1986 Egypt Cup winners |
| Zone 2 | (Saudi Arabia) Al-Hilal | 1985-86 Saudi Premier League winners |
| Zone 3 | (Algeria) JE Tizi Ouzou | 1985–86 Algerian Championship winners |
| Zone 3 | (Morocco) Raja Casablanca | 1986 Moroccan League runners up |
| Zone 3 | (Tunisia) ES Sahel | 1985–86 Tunisian Championship winners |
| Zone 4 | (Iraq) Al-Jaish | Iraqi League representative |
| Zone 4 | (Jordan) Al-Faisaly | 1985–86 Jordan League winners |
| Zone 4 | (Lebanon) Nadi Al-Riyada | Lebanese Premier League representative |
| Zone 4 | Palestine SC | West Bank Premier League representative |
| Zone 4 | (Syria) Jableh | 1985–86 Syrian League runners up |

== Preliminary round ==
A preliminary stage was held for sides in Africa and Asia with the finals changing into two groups with winners and runners up advancing to the semi-finals stage.

=== Zone 1 (Gulf Area) ===
Al-Arabi advanced to the final tournament, The Red Sea.

=== Zone 2 (Red Sea) ===
Tersana and Al-Hilal advanced to the final tournament in North Africa.

=== Zone 3 (North Africa) ===
Preliminary round tournament held in Casablanca, Morocco.

| Team | Pld | W | D | L | GF | GA | GD | Pts |
|---|---|---|---|---|---|---|---|---|
| (Tunisia) ES Sahel | 2 | 2 | 0 | 0 | 7 | 2 | +5 | 4 |
| (Algeria) JE Tizi Ouzou | 2 | 0 | 1 | 1 | 1 | 3 | −2 | 1 |
| (Morocco) Raja Casablanca | 2 | 0 | 1 | 1 | 1 | 4 | −3 | 1 |

| ES Sahel (Tunisia) | 4 – 1 | (Morocco) Raja CA |
|---|---|---|
| | | Abderrahim El Hamraoui |

Casablanca

| ES Sahel (Tunisia) | 3 – 1 | (Algeria) JE Tizi Ouzou |

Casablanca

| JE Tizi Ouzou (Algeria) | 0 – 0 | (Morocco) Raja CA |

Casablanca

ES Sahel and JE Tizi Ouzou advanced to the final tournament.

=== Zone 4 (East Region) ===
Preliminary round tournament held in Amman, Jordan from 18 to 26 July.

19 July 1987

| Al-Jaish (Iraq) | 2 – 0 | Palestine SC |
|---|---|---|
| Fahim (–); Rasheed (–) |

Amman International Stadium, Amman
21 July 1987

| Al-Jaish (Iraq) | 1 – 0 | (Lebanon) Nadi Al-Riyada |
|---|---|---|
| Rasheed (–) |

Amman International Stadium, Amman
24 July 1987

| Al-Jaish (Iraq) | 2 – 1 | (Syria) Jableh |
|---|---|---|
| Ghanem (–); Mahmoud (–) | | – (–) |

Amman International Stadium, Amman
26 July 1987

| Al-Faisaly (Jordan) | 1 – 2 | (Iraq) Al-Jaish |
|---|---|---|
| – (–) | | Mousa (–); Mahmoud (–) |

Amman International Stadium, Amman

Al-Jaish and Palestine SC advanced to the final tournament.

== Final tournament ==
=== Group stage ===
==== Group A ====
| Team | Pld | W | D | L | GF | GA | GD | Pts |
|---|---|---|---|---|---|---|---|---|
| (Iraq) Al-Rasheed | 3 | 3 | 0 | 0 | 13 | 2 | +11 | 6 |
| (Saudi Arabia) Al-Ittihad | 3 | 2 | 0 | 1 | 7 | 6 | +1 | 4 |
| (Tunisia) ES Sahel | 3 | 0 | 1 | 2 | 6 | 11 | −5 | 1 |
| Palestine SC | 3 | 0 | 1 | 2 | 2 | 9 | −7 | 1 |

22 October 1987

| Al-Rasheed (Iraq) | 5 – 1 | (Tunisia) ES Sahel |
|---|---|---|
| Radhi (–); Mohammed (–); Jafar (–); Hashim (–) | | (–) |

Riyadh
22 October 1987

| Al-Ittihad (Saudi Arabia) | 2 – 0 | Palestine SC |

Riyadh

24 October 1987

| Al-Rasheed (Iraq) | 5 – 0 | Palestine SC |
|---|---|---|
| Mohammed (–); Radhi (–); Hussein (–); Abdulkadhem (–) |

Riyadh
24 October 1987

| Al-Ittihad (Saudi Arabia) | 4 – 3 | (Tunisia) ES Sahel |

Riyadh

28 October 1987

| Al-Rasheed (Iraq) | 3 – 1 | (Saudi Arabia) Al-Ittihad |
|---|---|---|
| Mohammed 30', 64'; Dirjal 34' | | (–) |

Riyadh
28 October 1987

| Palestine SC | 2 – 2 | (Tunisia) ES Sahel |

Riyadh

==== Group B ====
| Team | Pld | W | D | L | GF | GA | GD | Pts |
|---|---|---|---|---|---|---|---|---|
| (Egypt) Tersana | 4 | 2 | 2 | 0 | 4 | 1 | +3 | 6 |
| (Algeria) JE Tizi Ouzou | 4 | 2 | 2 | 0 | 2 | 0 | +2 | 6 |
| (Saudi Arabia) Al-Hilal | 4 | 2 | 1 | 1 | 2 | 1 | +1 | 5 |
| (Iraq) Al-Jaish | 4 | 1 | 0 | 3 | 3 | 3 | 0 | 2 |
| (Qatar) Al-Arabi | 4 | 0 | 1 | 3 | 1 | 7 | −6 | 1 |

21 October 1987

| Al-Hilal (Saudi Arabia) | 1 – 0 | (Qatar) Al-Arabi |

Riyadh
21 October 1987

| Al-Jaish (Iraq) | 0 – 1 | (Egypt) Tersana |
|---|---|---|
| | | 90' |

Riyadh

24 October 1987

| Tersana (Egypt) | 0 – 0 | (Algeria) JE Tizi Ouzou |

Riyadh
24 October 1987

| Al-Jaish (Iraq) | 3 – 0 | (Qatar) Al-Arabi |
|---|---|---|
| Hameed (–); Mahmoud (–) |

Riyadh

26 October 1987

| Al-Jaish (Iraq) | 0 – 1 | (Algeria) JE Tizi Ouzou |
|---|---|---|
| | | 90' |

Prince Faisal bin Fahd Stadium, Riyadh
Referee: Jassim Mandi (Bahrain)
26 October 1987

| Al-Hilal (Saudi Arabia) | 0 – 0 | (Egypt) Tersana |

Riyadh

29 October 1987

| Al-Arabi (Qatar) | 0 – 0 | (Algeria) JE Tizi Ouzou |

Riyadh
29 October 1987

| Al-Hilal (Saudi Arabia) | 2 – 1 | (Iraq) Al-Jaish |
|---|---|---|
| (–); 90' | | (–) |

Riyadh

| Al-Arabi (Qatar) | 1 – 3 | (Egypt) Tersana |

Riyadh

| Al-Hilal (Saudi Arabia) | 0 – 1 | (Algeria) JE Tizi Ouzou |

Riyadh

=== Knockout stage ===
Semi-finals
1 november – Riyadh
(Saudi Arabia) Al-Ittihad | 1
(Egypt) Tersana | 0
1 november – Riyadh
(Iraq) Al-Rasheed | 4
(Algeria) JE Tizi Ouzou | 0

Final
3 november – Riyadh
(Iraq) Al-Rasheed (aet) | 2
(Saudi Arabia) Al-Ittihad | 1
Third place
3 november – Riyadh
(Egypt) Tersana | 1
(Algeria) JE Tizi Ouzou | 2

==== Semi finals ====
1 November 1987

| Al-Ittihad (Saudi Arabia) | 1 – 0 | (Egypt) Tersana |

Prince Faisal bin Fahd Stadium, Riyadh

1 November 1987

| Al-Rasheed (Iraq) | 4 – 0 | (Algeria) JE Tizi Ouzou |
|---|---|---|
| Hashim (–); Mohammed (–); Dirjal 67' |

Prince Faisal bin Fahd Stadium, Riyadh
Referee: Jassim Mandi (Bahrain)

==== 3rd Place Match ====
3 November 1987

| Tersana (Egypt) | 1 – 2 | (Algeria) JE Tizi Ouzou |

Prince Faisal bin Fahd Stadium, Riyadh

==== Final ====
3 November 1987

| Al-Rasheed (Iraq) | 2 – 1 (a.e.t.) | (Saudi Arabia) Al-Ittihad |
|---|---|---|
| Jafar 99'; Allawi 103' | | Al-Muwallid (–) |

Prince Faisal bin Fahd Stadium, Riyadh
Referee: Mohamed Larache (Morocco)

== Winners ==
1987 Arab Club Champions Cup
winners

3rd title

== Goalscorers ==
| Rank | Player | Club | Goals |
|---|---|---|---|
| 1 | (Iraq) Haris Mohammed | (Iraq) Al-Rasheed | 7 |

== Awards ==
| Player | Goalkeeper | Fair Play Team |
|---|---|---|
| (Saudi Arabia) Saleh Nu'eimeh | (Iraq) Abdul-Fatah Nasif Jassim | Palestine SC |
