= 1983–84 Saudi Premier League =

Saudi Premier League
- Season: 1983–84
- Dates: 5 October 1983 – 17 February 1984
- Champions: Al-Ahli (2nd title)
- Asian Club Championship: Al-Ahli
- Gulf Club Champions Cup: Al-Ahli
- Arab Club Champions Cup: Al-Ahli
- Matches: 90
- Goals: 221 (2.46 per match)
- Top goalscorer: Hussam Abu Dawood (13 goals)
- Biggest home win: Al-Ahli 5–0 Al-Shabab (27 January 1984)
- Biggest away win: Al-Riyadh 0–4 Al-Hilal (4 November 1983); Al-Wehda 1–5 Al-Ettifaq (23 January 1984)
- Highest scoring: Al-Shabab 4–4 Al-Qadsiah (20 January 1984)
- Longest winning run: 6 games Al-Ahli
- Longest unbeaten run: 12 games Al-Ittihad
- Longest winless run: 11 games Al-Wehda
- Longest losing run: 7 games Al-Riyadh

The 1983–84 Saudi Premier League was the eighth season of Saudi Premier League since its establishment in 1976. Al-Ettifaq were the defending champions, having won their first title in the previous season. The campaign began on 5 October 1983 and ended on 17 February 1984. The league was contested by 10 teams the top 8 teams from the previous season as well as Al-Wehda and Al-Riyadh, who joined as the promoted clubs from the 1982–83 First Division.

Going into the final matchday, Al-Ahli were leading the table with 2 points ahead of derby rivals Al-Ittihad. Al-Ittihad would face fourth-placed Al-Qadsiah at home while Al-Ahli would face ninth-placed Al-Nahda away from home. Al-Ittihad would play on 9 February while Al-Ahli were originally scheduled to play on 10 February. However, Al-Ahli's match was delayed to 17 February. Al-Ahli won the League title on 9 February 1984 after Al-Ittihad drew Al-Qadsiah 1–1 at home. Telê Santana became the fifth Brazilian to win the Saudi Premier League after Didi, Mário Zagallo, Chico Formiga, and Chinesinho.

No relegation would happen this season following the decision to expand the league to 12 teams.

This season was notable for the absence of Saudi internationals. This was due to the Saudi national team's participation in the qualifiers for the 1984 Summer Olympics. These players include Al-Nassr's Majed Abdullah, Al-Ahli's Mohamed Abd Al-Jawad, Al-Hilal's Saleh Al-Nu'eimeh, Al-Ettifaq's Saleh Khalifa Al-Dosari, Al-Ittihad's Ahmed Bayazid, and Al-Shabab's Khalid Al-Ma'ajil among others.

== Teams ==
Ten teams competed in the league – the top eight teams of the previous season and the two promoted teams from the First Division. Al-Wehda and Al-Riyadh were promoted to the Premier League and returned to the top flight after an absence of one year. Al-Wehda were promoted on 24 March 1983 after defeating Al-Taawoun 2–0 at home. Al-Wehda clinched the title after drawing Al-Riyadh 0–0 in the final matchday. Al-Riyadh were promoted after drawing Al-Wehda 0–0 in the final matchday.

Ohod were the first team to be relegated following a 5–1 away defeat to Al-Shabab on 7 April 1983. The following day, Al-Rawdah were defeated by Al-Qadsiah 2–0 and were relegated.

=== Stadiums and locations ===
Locations of teams in the 1982–83 Saudi Premier League

Club	Location	Stadium	Head coach
Al-Ahli	Jeddah	Youth Welfare Stadium in Jeddah	(Brazil) Telê Santana
Al-Ettifaq	Dammam	Youth Welfare Stadium in Dammam	(Saudi Arabia) Khalil Al-Zayani
Al-Hilal	Riyadh	Youth Welfare Stadium in Al-Malaz	(Socialist Federal Republic of Yugoslavia) Ljubiša Broćić
Al-Ittihad	Jeddah	Youth Welfare Stadium in Jeddah	(Brazil) Vanderlei Luxemburgo
Al-Nahda	Dammam	Youth Welfare Stadium in Dammam	
Al-Nassr	Riyadh	Youth Welfare Stadium in Al-Malaz	(Brazil) Paulo César Carpegiani
Al-Qadsiah	Khobar	Youth Welfare Stadium in Al-Rakkah	
Al-Riyadh	Riyadh	Youth Welfare Stadium in Al-Malaz	
Al-Shabab	Riyadh	Youth Welfare Stadium in Al-Malaz	
Al-Wehda	Mecca	Youth Welfare Stadium in Jeddah	(Tunisia) Abdelmajid Chetali

=== Foreign players ===
Club	Player 1	Player 2	Former players
Al-Ahli			
Al-Ettifaq			
Al-Hilal	(Tunisia) Ali Kaabi		
Al-Ittihad			
Al-Nahda			
Al-Nassr			
Al-Qadsiah			
Al-Riyadh			
Al-Shabab			
Al-Wehda			

== League table ==
Pos	Team	Pld	W	D	L	GF	GA	GD	Pts	Qualification or relegation
1	Al-Ahli (C)	18	10	7	1	27	11	+16	27	Gulf Club Champions Cup and Arab Club Champions Cup and Asian Club Championship
2	Al-Ittihad	18	9	7	2	28	17	+11	25	
3	Al-Ettifaq	18	7	8	3	26	20	+6	22	
4	Al-Qadsiah	18	7	8	3	30	25	+5	22	
5	Al-Nassr	18	7	6	5	27	18	+9	20	
6	Al-Hilal	18	5	9	4	18	11	+7	19	
7	Al-Shabab	18	5	7	6	20	25	−5	17	
8	Al-Wehda	18	3	6	9	16	22	−6	12	
9	Al-Nahda	18	2	5	11	11	29	−18	9	
10	Al-Riyadh	18	2	3	13	18	43	−25	7	

Source: rsssf.com Al-Jazirah
(C) Champions
- Promoted: Ohod, Al-Jabalain.

Saudi Premier League
1983-84 winners

2nd title

== Results ==
Home \ Away	AHL	ETT	HIL	ITT	NAH	NSR	QAD	RIY	SHB	WHD
Al-Ahli		2–1	0–0	2–0	2–0	1–0	1–0	1–3	5–0	1–0
Al-Ettifaq	1–1		0–0	2–1	2–0	1–4	1–1	3–1	3–3	0–2
Al-Hilal	0–3	0–0		0–1	1–0	0–2	1–1	3–0	0–0	0–0
Al-Ittihad	1–1	1–1	1–1		4–2	2–2	1–1	4–1	3–0	1–0
Al-Nahda	0–0	0–0	0–4	1–2		0–3	0–2	2–2	2–1	2–2
Al-Nassr	2–2	0–1	0–0	0–1	0–0		1–1	5–1	0–3	2–1
Al-Qadsiah	2–3	2–2	3–2	2–3	2–1	2–2		1–1	1–0	2–1
Al-Riyadh	0–1	1–2	0–4	1–1	0–1	0–2	1–2		2–3	1–4
Al-Shabab	0–0	0–1	0–2	0–0	1–0	2–1	4–4	2–0		0–0
Al-Wehda	1–1	1–5	0–0	0–1	1–0	0–1	0–1	2–3	1–1	

Source: Al-Jazirah
Legend: Blue = home team win; Yellow = draw; Red = away team win.

== Season statistics ==
=== Top scorers ===
Rank	Player	Club	Goals
1	(Saudi Arabia) Hussam Abu Dawood	Al-Ahli	13
2	(Saudi Arabia) Mohaisen Al-Jam'an	Al-Nassr	11
2	(Saudi Arabia) Abdullah Ghurab	Al-Ittihad	11
4	(Saudi Arabia) Jamal Mohammed	Al-Ettifaq	9
5	(Saudi Arabia) Nasser Sodoos Al-Dossari	Al-Riyadh	8
5	(Saudi Arabia) Abdulrahman Al-Dawood	Al-Wehda	8
5	(Saudi Arabia) Hamad Al-Dossari	Al-Qadsiah	8
8	(Saudi Arabia) Ahmad Al-Bishi	Al-Qadsiah	7
8	(Saudi Arabia) Mohammed Abo Haidar	Al-Ettifaq	7
10	(Saudi Arabia) Talal Sobhi	Al-Ahli	6
10	(Saudi Arabia) Naif Marzooq	Al-Shabab	6
10	(Saudi Arabia) Saad Abo Samrah	Al-Ittihad	6
10	(Saudi Arabia) Hathal Al-Dossari	Al-Hilal	6

== See also ==
- 1984 King Cup
- 1985–86 Asian Club Championship
- 1985 Arab Club Champions Cup
