= Ahmed Radhi =

Iraqi footballer and manager (1964–2020)

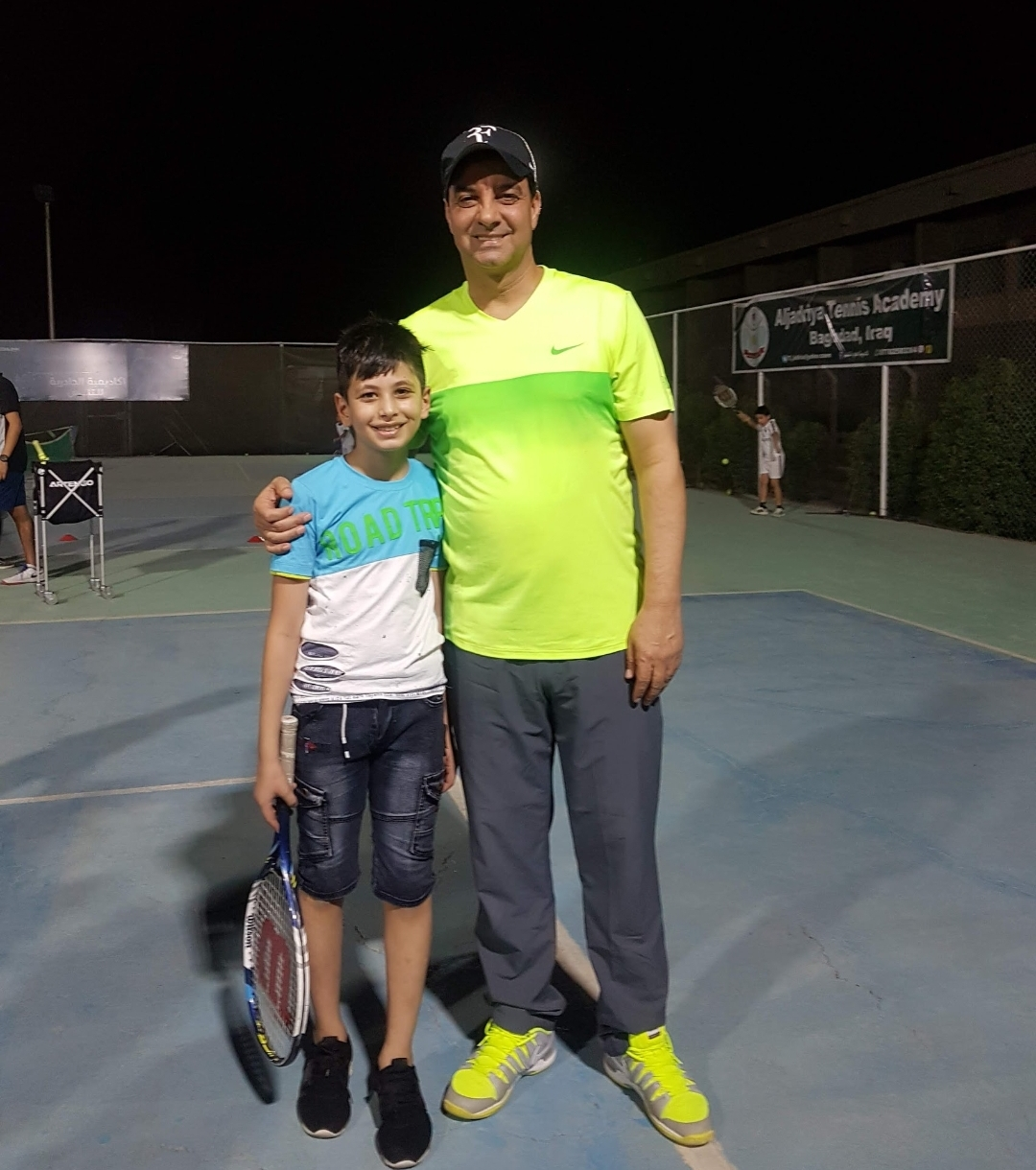
- Radhi (right) in 2019

Personal information
- Full name: Ahmed Radhi Humaiesh Al-Salehi
- Date of birth: 21 April 1964
- Place of birth: Baghdad, Iraq
- Date of death: 21 June 2020 (aged 56)
- Place of death: Baghdad, Iraq
- Height: 1.86 m (6 ft 1 in)
- Position: Striker

Youth career
- 1979–1980: Al-Shorta
- 1980–1981: Al-Zawraa

Senior career*
Years	Team	Apps	(Gls)
1981–1984	Al-Zawraa		(11)
1984–1990	Al-Rasheed		(43)
1990–1993	Al-Zawraa		(78)
1993–1997	Al-Wakrah		(23+)
1997–1998	Al-Zawraa		(7)
1998	Al-Arabi	1	(1)
1998	Dibba Al-Hisn		
1998–1999	Al-Zawraa		(7)

International career
1982–1997	Iraq	121	(62)

Managerial career
- 1999–2001: Al-Shorta
- 2001: Al-Quwa Al-Jawiya
- 2001–2002: Iraq U20
- 2002–2003: Al-Zawraa
- * Club domestic league appearances and goals

Ahmed Radhi Humaiesh Al-Salehi (Arabic: أَحْمَد رَاضِي هَمِيش الصَّالِحِيّ, 21 April 1964 – 21 June 2020) was an Iraqi footballer who played as a striker. Nicknamed "Al-Saher" (The Magician) in his playing days and regarded as one of Iraq's and Asia's best players of all time, Radhi scored the first Iraqi goal at the FIFA World Cup in its 1986 edition, a low shot to the corner of the net against Belgium in a 2–1 defeat. He was voted the Asian Footballer of the Year in 1988.

== Club career ==
Radhi started to make a name for himself after he was forced to switch childhood club Al-Zawraa for new powerhouse Al-Rasheed, the club founded and owned by Saddam Hussein's eldest son Uday. Alongside fellow legend Adnan Dirjal, Radhi led the club to reaching the 1988–89 Asian Club Championship final, losing to Qatari side Al Sadd on away goals. He later had a four-year spell at Al-Wakrah in Qatar before finishing his career with Al-Zawraa.

== International career ==
Radhi was given his debut for Iraq against Jordan on 21 February 1982 by Ammo Baba, who acknowledged his talent and supported the player in his first years of senior football. Coach Baba however left Radhi out of the 1984 Summer Olympics squad citing a lack of effort by the player. He then scored 8 goals in World Cup qualification, leading Iraq to a first World Cup finals, in Mexico in 1986.

With Iraq he won 2 Arab Cups, 1 Pan-Arab Games & a Gulf Cup, while he also did represent Iraq in the Olympics in 1988, scoring a goal each in games against Zambia and Guatemala. In 1988, he was voted Asian player of the year and 9th best Asian player of the century in 1999.

== Personal life ==
Radhi had three daughters and one son.

He fled Iraq in 2006 because of the sectarian violence and moved with his family to the Jordanian capital Amman, but returned to Iraq in 2007 for a career in politics. In October 2007, he was nominated by the opposition Iraqi Accord Front to the Council of Representatives of Iraq, replacing Abd al-Nasir al-Janabi, who had resigned to join the insurgency.

He was an unsuccessful candidate in the 2014 and 2018 elections with the National Alliance, a coalition of Sunni and Shia figures.

=== Death ===
Radhi was admitted into Al Nuaman General Hospital in Adhamiyah on 13 June 2020 after contracting COVID-19. He left the hospital only to be readmitted on 18 June after his condition worsened. On 21 June, Radhi was pronounced dead at the age of 56 following complications from COVID-19 during the pandemic in Iraq.

Details about his death were later revealed, that he was about to be taken to be treated in Jordan, but delays in finalizing his medical report postponed the proposed flight. However, the death happened after Radhi removed his artificial ventilation to go to the restroom by himself, later on the medical staff found him dead. His resting place is the Karkh Cemetery in Abu Ghraib.

== Career statistics ==
Club	Season	Qatar Stars League		Qatar Sheikh Jassem Cup		Crown Prince Cup		Qatar Emir Cup		Other		Total		
Club	Season	Apps	Goals	Apps	Goals	Apps	Goals	Apps	Goals	Apps	Goals	Apps	Goals	Assist
Al-Wakrah Sport Club	1993–94													
Al-Wakrah Sport Club	1994–95			0	0	0	0	7	6	0	0	+7	+6	
Al-Wakrah Sport Club	1995–96	15	7	0	0	3	0	2	0	0	0	20	7	
Al-Wakrah Sport Club	1996–97	15	4	0	0	0	0	2	0	0	0	17	4	
Career total														

Club	Season	Qatar Stars League		Qatar Sheikh Jassem Cup		Crown Prince Cup		Qatar Emir Cup		Other		Total		
Club	Season	Apps	Goals	Apps	Goals	Apps	Goals	Apps	Goals	Apps	Goals	Apps	Goals	Assist
Al-Arabi Sports Club	1997–98	1	1	0	0	3	2	2	1	0	0	6	4	
Career total		1	1	0	0	3	2	2	1	0	0	6	4	

=== International goals ===
Scores and results list Iraq's goal tally first.

#	Date	Venue	Opponent	Score	Result	Competition
1.	10 October 1983	Sharjah Stadium, Sharjah	United Arab Emirates	2–2	2–2	1984 Olympics qualifiers
2.	25 March 1984	Royal Oman Police Stadium, Muscat	Qatar	1–2	1–2	7th Arabian Gulf Cup
3.	15 March 1985	Al-Sadaqua Walsalam Stadium, Kuwait City	Lebanon	5–0	6–0	1986 FIFA World Cup qualification
4.	15 March 1985	Al-Sadaqua Walsalam Stadium, Kuwait City	Lebanon	6–0	6–0	1986 FIFA World Cup qualification
5.	18 March 1985	Al-Sadaqua Walsalam Stadium, Kuwait City	Lebanon	1–0	6–0	1986 FIFA World Cup qualification
6.	18 March 1985	Al-Sadaqua Walsalam Stadium, Kuwait City	Lebanon	2–0	6–0	1986 FIFA World Cup qualification
7.	18 March 1985	Al-Sadaqua Walsalam Stadium, Kuwait City	Lebanon	3–0	6–0	1986 FIFA World Cup qualification
8.	29 March 1985	King Abdullah Stadium, Amman	Jordan	3–2	3–2	1986 FIFA World Cup qualification
9.	19 April 1985	Al-Sadaqua Walsalam Stadium, Kuwait City	Jordan	1–0	2–0	1986 FIFA World Cup qualification
10.	5 May 1985	Yuva Bharati Krirangan, Calcutta	Qatar	1–0	2–1	1986 FIFA World Cup qualification
11.	6 August 1985	Stade Mohammed V, Casablanca	Libya	2–0	2–0	1985 Pan Arab Games
12.	14 August 1985	Stade Mohammed V, Casablanca	Saudi Arabia	1–0	2–1	1985 Pan Arab Games
13.	14 August 1985	Stade Mohammed V, Casablanca	Saudi Arabia	2–0	2–1	1985 Pan Arab Games
14.	1 November 1985	Al-Shaab Stadium, Baghdad	Bahrain	3–1	3–1	Friendly
15.	8 June 1986	Estadio Nemesio Díez, Toluca	Belgium	1–2	1–2	1986 FIFA World Cup
16.	21 September 1986	Daegu Stadium, Daegu	Oman	4–0	4–0	1986 Asian Games
17.	23 September 1986	Daegu Stadium, Daegu	Pakistan	5–1	5–1	1986 Asian Games
18.	27 March 1987	Al-Sadaqua Walsalam Stadium, Kuwait City	United Arab Emirates	1–1	1–1	1988 Olympics qualifiers
19.	8 April 1987	Manama National Stadium. Manama	Bahrain	2–1	3–1	Friendly
20.	8 April 1987	Manama National Stadium. Manama	Bahrain	3–1	3–1	Friendly
21.	1 May 1987	Al-Rashid Stadium, Dubai	United Arab Emirates	1–0	3–0	1988 Olympics qualifiers
22.	8 January 1988	Sultan Qaboos Sports Complex, Muscat	Qatar	4–1	4–1	1988 Olympics qualifiers
23.	25 February 1988	Stade El Menzah, Tunis	Tunisia	1–0	2–0	Friendly
24.	8 March 1988	King Fahd Stadium, Riyadh	Kuwait	1–0	1–0	9th Arabian Gulf Cup
25.	13 March 1988	King Fahd Stadium, Riyadh	Qatar	2–0	3–0	9th Arabian Gulf Cup
26.	13 March 1988	King Fahd Stadium, Riyadh	Qatar	3–0	3–0	9th Arabian Gulf Cup
27.	16 March 1988	King Fahd Stadium, Riyadh	Saudi Arabia	1–0	2–0	9th Arabian Gulf Cup
28.	9 July 1988	Amman International Stadium, Amman	Tunisia	1–0	1–1	1988 Arab Nations Cup
29.	15 July 1988	Amman International Stadium, Amman	Saudi Arabia	1–0	2–0	1988 Arab Nations Cup
30.	15 July 1988	Amman International Stadium, Amman	Saudi Arabia	2–0	2–0	1988 Arab Nations Cup
31.	19 July 1988	Amman International Stadium, Amman	Jordan	1–0	3–0	1988 Arab Nations Cup
32.	17 September 1988	Daejeon Hanbat Stadium, Daejeon	Zambia	1–0	2–2	1988 Olympic Games
33.	19 September 1988	Daejeon Hanbat Stadium, Daejeon	Guatemala	1–0	3–0	1988 Olympic Games
34.	27 January 1989	Al-Shaab Stadium, Baghdad	Oman	1–0	3–1	1990 FIFA World Cup qualification
35.	3 February 1989	Al-Shaab Stadium, Baghdad	Jordan	1–0	4–0	1990 FIFA World Cup qualification
36.	3 February 1989	Al-Shaab Stadium, Baghdad	Jordan	2–0	4–0	1990 FIFA World Cup qualification
37.	3 February 1989	Al-Shaab Stadium, Baghdad	Jordan	3–0	4–0	1990 FIFA World Cup qualification
38.	3 February 1989	Al-Shaab Stadium, Baghdad	Jordan	4–0	4–0	1990 FIFA World Cup qualification
39.	10 February 1989	Al-Shaab Stadium, Baghdad	Qatar	1–0	2–2	1990 FIFA World Cup qualification
40.	3 November 1989	Al-Sadaqua Walsalam Stadium, Kuwait City	South Yemen	1–0	6–2	1989 Peace and Friendship Cup
41.	3 November 1989	Al-Sadaqua Walsalam Stadium, Kuwait City	South Yemen	2–0	6–2	1989 Peace and Friendship Cup
42.	8 November 1989	Al-Sadaqua Walsalam Stadium, Kuwait City	Kuwait	1–1	2–1	1989 Peace and Friendship Cup
43.	8 November 1989	Al-Sadaqua Walsalam Stadium, Kuwait City	Kuwait	2–1	2–1	1989 Peace and Friendship Cup
44.	12 November 1989	Al-Sadaqua Walsalam Stadium, Kuwait City	Uganda	1–0	1–1	1989 Peace and Friendship Cup
45.	3 March 1990	National Stadium, Kuwait City	United Arab Emirates	1–2	2–2	10th Arabian Gulf Cup
46.	18 August 1992	National Stadium, Irbid	Ethiopia	1–0	13–0	1992 Jordan International Tournament
47.	18 August 1992	National Stadium, Irbid	Ethiopia	5–0	13–0	1992 Jordan International Tournament
48.	18 August 1992	National Stadium, Irbid	Ethiopia	7–0	13–0	1992 Jordan International Tournament
49.	18 August 1992	National Stadium, Irbid	Ethiopia	10–0	13–0	1992 Jordan International Tournament
50.	18 August 1992	National Stadium, Irbid	Ethiopia	13–0	13–0	1992 Jordan International Tournament
51.	20 August 1992	National Stadium, Irbid	Congo	1–0	3–0	1992 Jordan International Tournament
52.	20 August 1992	National Stadium, Irbid	Congo	2–0	3–0	1992 Jordan International Tournament
53.	25 April 1993	Changwon Civic Stadium, Changwon	South Korea	1–1	1–1	Friendly
54.	26 May 1993	Kofahi Inter Stadium, Irbid	Yemen	5–1	6–1	1994 FIFA World Cup qualification
55.	28 May 1993	Kofahi Inter Stadium, Irbid	Pakistan	4–0	8–0	1994 FIFA World Cup qualification
56.	30 May 1993	Kofahi Inter Stadium, Irbid	China	1–0	1–0	1994 FIFA World Cup qualification
57.	14 June 1993	Chengdu Sports Centre, Chengdu	Jordan	4–0	4–0	1994 FIFA World Cup qualification
58.	16 June 1993	Chengdu Sports Centre, Chengdu	Yemen	3–0	3–0	1994 FIFA World Cup qualification
59.	22 October 1993	Khalifa International Stadium, Doha	Iran	1–0	2–1	1994 FIFA World Cup qualification
60.	24 October 1993	Khalifa International Stadium, Doha	Saudi Arabia	1–0	1–1	1994 FIFA World Cup qualification
61.	28 October 1993	Khalifa International Stadium, Doha	Japan	1–1	2–2	1994 FIFA World Cup qualification
62.	23 May 1997	Lahore Stadium, Lahore	Pakistan	6–2	6–2	1998 FIFA World Cup qualification

== Honours ==
=== Player ===
Al-Rasheed

- Iraqi Premier League: 1986–87, 1987–88, 1988–89
- Iraq FA Cup: 1986–87, 1987–88
- Arab Club Champions Cup: 1985, 1986, 1987

Al-Zawraa

- Iraqi Premier League: 1990–91, 1998–99
- Iraq FA Cup: 1990–91, 1992–93, 1997–98, 1998–99
- Baghdad Championship: 1991–92

Iraq

- Asian Games: 1982
- Arabian Gulf Cup: 1984, 1988
- Arab Games: 1985
- Arab Cup: 1988

Individual

- Asian Footballer of the Year: 1988
- Arabian Gulf Cup top scorer: 1988
- Arab Cup top scorer: 1988
- Iraqi Premier League top scorer: 1985–86, 1991–92
- Chosen in the Asia's Top 10 Players of the Century list by IFFHS.

=== Manager ===
Al-Shorta

- Baghdad Championship: 2000–01

== See also ==
- List of men's footballers with 100 or more international caps
- List of men's footballers with 50 or more international goals
