= 1984–85 Iraqi National League =

Football league season

Iraqi National League
- Season: 1984–85
- Champions: N/A (season cancelled)
- Asian Club Championship: Al-Rasheed
- Arab Club Champions Cup: Al-Rasheed

The 1984–85 Iraqi National Clubs First Division League was the 11th season of the competition since its foundation in 1974. For the first time in Iraqi football history, three points were awarded for a win instead of two.

The tournament reached round 21 with several postponed games from previous rounds, and on 23 February 1985, the Iraq Football Association (IFA) officially cancelled the league. This was because the league schedule was conflicting with the national team's World Cup qualifying campaign, which was considered to be the priority. At the time of cancellation, Al-Talaba's Hussein Saeed was the leading scorer with 14 goals.

== Name changes ==
- Qiwa Al-Amn Al-Dakhili renamed to Al-Shorta.

== League table at abandonment ==
Pos	Team	Pld	W	D	L	GF	GA	GD	Pts	Qualification
1	Al-Rasheed	18	13	4	1	32	8	+24	43	1985–86 Asian Club Championship and 1985 Arab Club Champions Cup (Note: The IFA decided to admit Al-Rasheed, the league leaders before the league was cancelled, into both of the AFC and UAFA competitions.)
2	Al-Jaish	18	9	5	4	26	17	+9	32	
3	Al-Talaba	15	8	5	2	26	14	+12	29	
4	Al-Minaa	18	7	6	5	20	17	+3	27	
5	Al-Shabab	18	7	4	7	24	23	+1	25	
6	Salahaddin	19	5	9	5	17	19	−2	24	
7	Al-Zawraa	14	6	4	4	21	17	+4	22	
8	Al-Mosul	20	6	4	10	19	29	−10	22	
9	Al-Tayaran	16	5	6	5	14	15	−1	21	
10	Al-Shorta	19	5	6	8	20	22	−2	21	
11	Al-Tijara	17	5	6	6	11	14	−3	21	
12	Al-Sinaa	14	5	4	5	13	13	0	19	
13	Wahid Huzairan	17	2	4	11	9	26	−17	10	
14	Al-Amana	17	1	5	11	10	28	−18	8	

Source: Ali Al-Sabti Archive

== Results ==
Home \ Away	AMN	JSH	MIN	MSL	RSH	SHB	SHR	SIN	TLB	TAY	TJR	ZWR	SAL	WHU
Al-Amana		1–2			0–0	1–0		1–1			0–0			0–0
Al-Jaish			2–0	4–1		1–1	1–0	2–2	1–3			2–1	0–0	
Al-Minaa	2–1			1–1	0–0	1–2	1–0	0–0	1–1	0–1	1–2		1–0	3–1
Al-Mosul	1–0		1–2		1–2		1–0	0–0	1–2	0–0	1–0	3–2		0–1
Al-Rasheed	3–1	1–0	0–0	3–1		3–0	1–1	2–0	1–0		4–0		3–1	1–0
Al-Shabab	5–2	0–2		1–2			1–2	1–2	1–2	4–2	0–0		2–0	2–1
Al-Shorta	4–1	1–2	0–1	2–4					1–1	0–0	1–0	1–1		2–0
Al-Sinaa	1–0	2–3	2–0	1–0		0–1				0–1				1–0
Al-Talaba				5–0		2–2	3–1			1–1			1–0	1–0
Al-Tayaran	2–1	1–1			0–2	0–1	0–2				0–2	2–1	0–0	4–0
Al-Tijara	2–0	0–0		1–0	1–2		1–1		1–2			0–0	0–0	
Al-Zawraa	2–1	2–0	3–3	1–0	0–3		2–0				2–0		1–1	3–1
Salahaddin	3–0	0–3		1–1	2–1	0–0	1–1	2–1	2–1	0–0				3–2
Wahid Huzairan	0–0	1–0	0–3						1–1		0–1		1–1	

Source: Ali Al-Sabti Archive
Legend: Blue = home team win; Yellow = draw; Red = away team win.

== Season statistics ==
=== Hat-tricks ===
Player	For	Against	Result	Date
(Iraq) Jalil Hanoon	Al-Minaa	Al-Zawraa	3–3	20 October 1984
(Iraq) Jalil Hanoon	Al-Minaa	Wahid Huzairan	3–0	1 January 1985
