= Kadhim Mutashar =

Iraqi footballer

Personal information
- Full name: Kadhim Mutashar Hamid
- Date of birth: 1 January 1960 (age 66)
- Position: Defender

Senior career*
Years	Team	Apps	(Gls)
1979−1984	Al-Talaba SC		
1984−1989	Al-Rasheed SC		

International career
1984–1986	Iraq		
- * Club domestic league appearances and goals

Kadhim Mutashar (born 1 January 1960) is an Iraqi former footballer. He competed in the men's tournament at the 1984 Summer Olympics. Kadhim played for Iraq between 1984 and 1986.
