= 1989 Arab Cup Winners' Cup =

الكأس العربية للأندية الفائزة بالكؤوس 1989

Tournament details
- Host country: Saudi Arabia
- City: Jeddah
- Dates: 20 Sep – 1 Oct 1989
- Teams: 8 (from 1 association)

Final positions
- Champions: (Tunisia) Stade Tunisien (1st title)
- Runners-up: Kuwait SC
- Third place: (Iraq) Al-Rasheed
- Fourth place: (Sudan) Al-Hilal Club

Tournament statistics
- Matches played: 16
- Goals scored: 37 (2.31 per match)
- Top scorer: (Iraq) Laith Hussein (4 goals)
- Best player: (Tunisia) Hechmi Sassi
- Best goalkeeper: (Kuwait) Ahmad Sulaiman

The 1989 Arab Cup Winners' Cup was the first edition of the Arab Cup Winners' Cup held in Jeddah, Saudi Arabia between 20 September – 1 October 1989. The teams represented Arab nations from Africa and Asia.

Stade Tunisien of Tunisia claimed the title in the final against Kuwait SC of Kuwait.

== Group stage ==
=== Group 1 ===
Team	Pld	W	D	L	GF	GA	GD	Pts
(Tunisia) Stade Tunisien	3	2	1	0	7	2	+5	5
(Iraq) Al-Rasheed	3	1	2	0	8	1	+7	4
(Saudi Arabia) Al-Ittihad Jeddah	3	1	1	1	6	2	+4	3
(Syria) Al-Fotuwa	3	0	0	3	0	16	−16	0

20 September 1989

Al-Ittihad Jeddah (Saudi Arabia)	5 – 0	(Syria) Al-Fotuwa

Prince Abdullah Al Faisal Stadium, Jeddah
20 September 1989

Al-Rasheed (Iraq)	1 – 1	(Tunisia) Stade Tunisien

Prince Abdullah Al Faisal Stadium, Jeddah

22 September 1989

Al-Ittihad Jeddah (Saudi Arabia)	0 – 0	(Syria) Al-Rasheed

Prince Abdullah Al Faisal Stadium, Jeddah
22 September 1989

Al-Fotuwa (Syria)	0 – 4	(Tunisia) Stade Tunisien

Prince Abdullah Al Faisal Stadium, Jeddah

24 September 1989

Al-Rasheed (Iraq)	7 – 0	(Syria) Al-Fotuwa

Prince Abdullah Al Faisal Stadium, Jeddah
24 September 1989

Al-Ittihad Jeddah (Saudi Arabia)	1 – 2	(Tunisia) Stade Tunisien

Prince Abdullah Al Faisal Stadium, Jeddah

=== Group 2 ===
Team	Pld	W	D	L	GF	GA	GD	Pts
Kuwait SC	3	1	2	0	3	2	+1	4
(Sudan) Al-Hilal Club	3	1	2	0	3	2	+1	4
(Algeria) CR Belcourt	3	1	1	1	2	1	+1	3
(Egypt) Zamalek SC	3	0	1	2	2	5	−3	1

21 September 1989

Zamalek SC (Egypt)	1 – 1	(Sudan) Al-Hilal Club
		Subhi

Prince Abdullah Al Faisal Stadium, Jeddah
21 September 1989

Kuwait SC	0 – 0	(Algeria) CR Belcourt

Prince Abdullah Al Faisal Stadium, Jeddah

23 September 1989

Zamalek SC (Egypt)	1 – 2	Kuwait SC

Prince Abdullah Al Faisal Stadium, Jeddah
23 September 1989

Al-Hilal Club (Sudan)	1 – 0	(Algeria) CR Belcourt

Prince Abdullah Al Faisal Stadium, Jeddah

25 September 1989

Zamalek SC (Egypt)	0 – 2	(Algeria) CR Belcourt
		Neggazi 72'; Chafa 79'

Prince Abdullah Al Faisal Stadium, Jeddah
Referee: Ahmed Hakeem (UA Emirates)
25 September 1989

Kuwait SC	1 – 1	(Sudan) Al-Hilal Club

Prince Abdullah Al Faisal Stadium, Jeddah

== Knock-out stage ==
Semi-finals
27 September – Jeddah
(Tunisia) Stade Tunisien	1
(Sudan) Al-Hilal Club	0
28 September – Jeddah
Kuwait SC (p)	0 (4)
(Iraq) Al-Rasheed	0 (3)

Final
1 October – Jeddah
(Tunisia) Stade Tunisien (p)	0 (6)
Kuwait SC	0 (5)
Third place
1 October – Jeddah
(Iraq) Al-Rasheed	3
(Sudan) Al-Hilal Club	2

=== Semi-finals ===
27 September 1989

Stade Tunisien (Tunisia)	1 – 0	(Sudan) Al-Hilal Club

Prince Abdullah Al Faisal Stadium, Jeddah

28 September 1989

Kuwait SC	0 – 0 (a.e.t.)	(Iraq) Al-Rasheed
Penalties
	4 – 3

Prince Abdullah Al Faisal Stadium, Jeddah

=== Third place match ===
1 October 1989

Al-Rasheed (Iraq)	3 – 2	(Sudan) Al-Hilal Club
		Tashein 19'

Prince Abdullah Al Faisal Stadium, Jeddah

=== Final ===
1 October 1989

Stade Tunisien (Tunisia)	0 – 0 (a.e.t.)	Kuwait SC
Penalties
Khemiri (penalty scored); Ben Farhat (penalty scored); Sassi (penalty missed); Ncibi (penalty scored); Draoui (penalty scored); El Ghoul (penalty scored); Bel Akhdhar (penalty scored)	6 – 5	(penalty scored) Al-Jasem; (penalty scored) Al-Nasar; (penalty scored) Abdel Aziz; (penalty missed) Al-Hasawi; (penalty scored) Abbas; (penalty scored) ? (penalty missed) Al-Anbari

Prince Abdullah Al Faisal Stadium, Jeddah
Referee: Abdelali Naciri (Morocco)

== Winners ==
1989 Arab Cup Winners' Cup
(Tunisia)
Stade Tunisien
First title
