= 1985–86 Iraqi National League =

Iraqi National League
- Season: 1985–86
- Champions: Al-Talaba (3rd title)
- Relegated: Al-Sulaikh; Al-Amana; Wahid Huzairan; Al-Minaa; Al-Tijara
- Asian Club Championship: Al-Talaba
- Arab Club Champions Cup: Al-Rasheed
- Top goalscorer: Ahmed Radhi; Hussein Saeed; Rahim Hameed (9 goals each)

The 1985–86 Iraqi National Clubs First Division League was the 12th season of the competition since its foundation in 1974. Unlike the previous season, each win was worth two points rather than three. Al-Talaba won their third league title, finishing two points ahead of Al-Rasheed and only losing one match.

== League table ==
Pos	Team	Pld	W	D	L	GF	GA	GD	Pts	Qualification or relegation
1	Al-Talaba (C)	15	11	3	1	26	8	+18	25	1986 Asian Club Championship
2	Al-Rasheed	15	11	1	3	24	10	+14	23	1986 Arab Club Champions Cup (Note: As holders, Al-Rasheed automatically qualified for the Arab Club Champions Cup.)
3	Al-Tayaran	15	9	4	2	22	11	+11	22	
4	Al-Shabab	15	7	6	2	17	11	+6	20	
5	Al-Jaish	15	8	2	5	17	10	+7	18	
6	Al-Shorta	15	5	8	2	15	12	+3	18	
7	Salahaddin	15	4	9	2	14	13	+1	17	
8	Al-Mosul	15	5	6	4	11	14	−3	16	
9	Al-Zawraa	15	5	3	7	25	15	+10	13	
10	Al-Sinaa	15	3	7	5	11	11	0	13	
11	Al-Sulaikh	15	3	6	6	13	14	−1	12	Relegated via play-offs (Note: The relegation play-offs saw two top division places being contested by the bottom six from the top division and the top four from the lower division. Al-Naft were able to retain their place in the top division through the play-offs, beating Al-Nasr 4–2, Erbil 1–0, Al-Amana 4–2 on penalties and Al-Bahri 4–3 on penalties after a 1–1 draw, while Al-Bahri earned the other place to secure promotion. Al-Sulaikh, Al-Amana, Wahid Huzairan, Al-Minaa and Al-Tijara were therefore relegated to the Iraqi National Second Division.)
12	Al-Amana	15	3	6	6	15	22	−7	12	Relegated via play-offs
13	Wahid Huzairan	15	2	7	6	12	23	−11	11	Relegated via play-offs
14	Al-Minaa	15	3	3	9	13	22	−9	9	Relegated via play-offs
15	Al-Naft	15	1	5	9	8	21	−13	7	Into play-offs
16	Al-Tijara	15	1	2	12	7	33	−26	4	Relegated via play-offs

Source: Ali Al-Sabti Archive
(C) Champions

== Results ==
Home \ Away	AMN	JSH	MIN	MSL	NFT	RSH	SHB	SHR	SIN	SLK	TLB	TAY	TJR	ZWR	SAL	WHU
Al-Amana							0–0	1–1	0–0	2–0			3–2	1–0		3–3
Al-Jaish	2–0		1–0	2–0	1–0				2–0	2–1			4–0	2–1	0–0	0–0
Al-Minaa	2–1			0–0	3–1				2–1							2–2
Al-Mosul	3–1				1–0		0–0	2–1	1–0				1–0			1–1
Al-Naft	1–1									1–1			1–0	0–2	2–2	
Al-Rasheed	2–0	2–0	1–0	4–0	2–1		2–2	2–0	2–1	2–1		2–1	1–0			2–1
Al-Shabab		3–1	1–0		2–0			1–1	1–1	1–0			1–0	1–0	0–0	1–0
Al-Shorta		1–0	1–0		0–0				0–0	1–0			2–1	3–1	3–3	0–0
Al-Sinaa					0–0								2–0		2–0	
Al-Sulaikh			1–0	1–1					1–1				3–0		0–0	2–0
Al-Talaba	1–0	1–0	3–0	0–0	3–1	1–0	3–1	1–1	0–2	1–0		3–1	2–0	2–1	0–0	5–1
Al-Tayaran	4–1	1–0	3–2	2–0	2–0		3–2	0–0	0–0	0–0			3–1	1–0	1–0	0–0
Al-Tijara			1–0													1–1
Al-Zawraa			3–0	1–1		1–0			0–0	2–2			8–0			4–0
Salahaddin	1–1		2–2	1–0		1–0							1–1	2–1		1–0
Wahid Huzairan					1–0				2–1							

Source: Ali Al-Sabti Archive
Legend: Blue = home team win; Yellow = draw; Red = away team win.

== Season statistics ==
=== Top scorers ===
Pos	Scorer	Goals	Team
1	Ahmed Radhi	9	Al-Rasheed
1	Hussein Saeed	9	Al-Talaba
1	Rahim Hameed	9	Al-Jaish

=== Hat-tricks ===
Player	For	Against	Result	Date
(Iraq) Mohammed Jassim	Al-Tayaran	Al-Amana	4–1	28 November 1985
(Iraq) Hussein Saeed^{4}	Al-Talaba	Wahid Huzairan	5–1	24 January 1986
(Iraq) Rahim Hameed	Al-Jaish	Al-Tijara	4–0	24 January 1986
(Iraq) Saad Jassim	Al-Zawraa	Al-Tijara	8–0	12 February 1986

Notes

^{4} Player scored 4 goals
