= 3rd GCC Club Championship =

1985 GCC Club Championship
Tournament details
- Teams: 6 (from AFC/UAFA confederations)
- Venue: 1 (in 1 host city)

Final positions
- Champions: (Saudi Arabia) Al-Ahli (1st title)
- Runners-up: (Kuwait) Al-Arabi

The 3rd GCC Club Championship (Arabic: بطولة الأنديـة الخليجية أبطال الدوري) was the third edition of the GCC Club Championship for clubs of the Gulf Cooperation Council nations, held in 1985 at Dubai. Al-Ahli won the title for the first time in their history. It served as the qualifier for the 1985–86 Asian Club Championship.

== Group stage ==
=== Group A ===
Team	Pts	Pld	W	D	L	GF	GA	GD
(Kuwait) Al-Arabi	8	4	4	0	0	8	2	+6
(Bahrain) Al Muharraq	2	3	1	0	2	3	4	−1
(Qatar) Al Rayyan	0	3	0	0	3	1	6	−5

=== Group B ===
Team	Pts	Pld	W	D	L	GF	GA	GD
(Saudi Arabia) Al Ahli	8	4	4	0	0	8	1	+7
(Oman) Fanja	3	4	1	0	3	4	6	−2
(United Arab Emirates) Al Ain	3	4	1	0	3	5	10	−5

4 January 1985

Al Ain (United Arab Emirates)	0–2	(Saudi Arabia) Al Ahli

Tahnoun bin Mohammed, Al Ain

10 January 1985

Fanja (Oman)	2–3	(United Arab Emirates) Al Ain

Royal Oman Police, Muscat

18 January 1985

Al Ahli (Saudi Arabia)	1–0	(Oman) Fanja

Prince Abdullah Al Faisal, Jeddah

24 January 1985

Al Ahli (Saudi Arabia)	4–1	(United Arab Emirates) Al Ain

Prince Abdullah Al Faisal, Jeddah

2 February 1985

Al Ain (United Arab Emirates)	1–2	(Oman) Fanja

Khalifa bin Zayed, Al Ain

7 February 1985

Fanja (Oman)	0–1	(Saudi Arabia) Al Ahli

Royal Oman Police, Muscat

=== Final ===
Al Ahli (Saudi Arabia)	2–1	(Kuwait) Al-Arabi

== Winner ==
GCC Club Championship
1985 Winners

Al-Ahli
1st Title
