= Fatah Nsaief =

Iraqi footballer

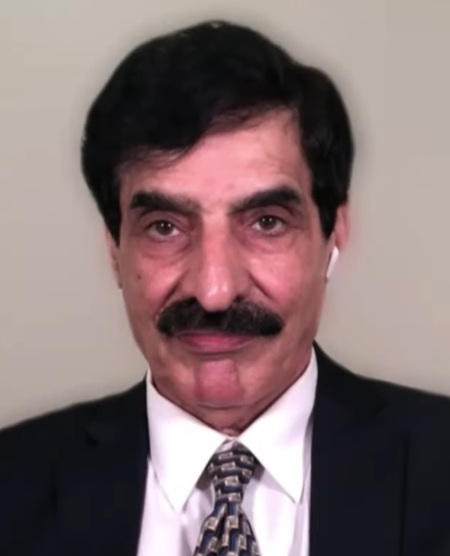

Personal information
- Full name: Abdul-Fatah Nsaief Jassim
- Date of birth: 2 February 1951 (age 75)
- Place of birth: Iraq
- Height: 1.85 m (6 ft 1 in)
- Position: Goalkeeper

Senior career*
Years	Team	Apps	(Gls)
1968–1969	Al-Omma		
1969–1974	Al-Firqa Al-Thalitha		
1974–1988	Al-Jaish		

International career
1977–1988	Iraq	52	(0)
- * Club domestic league appearances and goals

Abdul-Fatah Nsaief Jassim (also Nussaif, born 2 February 1951) is a former Iraqi football goalkeeper who spent the bulk of his career for Al-Jaish and was a national team vice-captain, usually deputising for fellow custodian Raad Hammoudi. He represented Iraq at the 1980 Summer Olympics and 1986 FIFA World Cup.
