= 1986 Arab Club Champions Cup =

بطولة الأندية العربية لأبطال الدوري 1986

Tournament details
- Host country: Tunisia
- City: Tunis
- Dates: 11–22 November 1986
- Teams: 5 (from 1 association)
- Venue: 1 (in 1 host city)

Final positions
- Champions: (Iraq) Al-Rasheed SC (2nd title)
- Runners-up: (Tunisia) ES Tunis
- Third place: (Saudi Arabia) Al-Hilal
- Fourth place: (Kuwait) Al-Arabi

Tournament statistics
- Matches played: 5
- Goals scored: 17 (3.4 per match)

The 1986 Arab Club Champions Cup was played in the African half of the Arab world for the first time, in Tunis, Tunisia. Al-Rasheed won the championship for the 2nd time, defending their championship and becoming the first side to win the title outside of their homeland in the process.

== Participants ==
Participants
Zone	Team	Qualifying method
	(Iraq) Al-Rasheed	Holders
Zone 1	(Kuwait) Al-Arabi	1984-85 Kuwaiti Premier League winners
Zone 2	(Saudi Arabia) Al-Hilal	1984-85 Saudi Arabia League winners
Zone 2	(Somalia) Wagad Club	1985 Somalia League winners
Zone 2	(Yemen Arab Republic) Al-Ahli Taizz	Invitee (no Yemeni Championship)
Zone 3	(Algeria) MA Hussein Dey	1984–85 Algerian Championship 4th place
Zone 3	(Morocco) MAS Fez	1984-85 Moroccan Championship winners
Zone 3	(Tunisia) ES Tunis	1984-85 Tunisian Championship winners
Zone 4	(Jordan) Al-Faisaly	1984-85 Jordan League winners
Zone 4	(Lebanon) Safa	Invitee (no Lebanese Championship)
Zone 4	(Palestine) Hilal Al-Quds	Invitee
Zone 4	(Syria) Al-Jaish	1984-85 Syrian League winners

== Preliminary round ==
=== Zone 1 (Gulf Area) ===
Al-Arabi qualified to the final tournament.

=== Zone 2 (Red Sea) ===
Matches held in Riyadh

11 October 1986

Al-Ahli Taizz (Yemen)	0–1	(Somalia) Wagad Club
	Report	Nur 26'

Youth Welfare Stadium, Riyadh
13 October 1986

Al Hilal (Saudi Arabia)	4–0	(Somalia) Wagad Club
Al-Hammad 15'; Al-Thunayan 61'; Mubarak 85'; Al-Tukhaifi 87'	Report

Youth Welfare Stadium, Riyadh
15 October 1986

Al-Hilal (Saudi Arabia)	5–1	(Yemen) Al-Ahli Taizz
Bashir 3'; Jazea 27'; Al-Hammad 46', 76', 78'	Report	Thabet 50'

Youth Welfare Stadium, Riyadh

Al-Hilal qualified to the final tournament.

=== Zone 3 (North Africa) ===
Matches held in Tunis

ES Tunis (Tunisia)	2 – 1	(Morocco) MAS Fez

Stade El Menzah, Tunis

MA Hussein Dey (Algeria)	–	(Morocco) MAS Fez

Stade El Menzah, Tunis

ES Tunis (Tunisia)	6 – 0	(Algeria) MA Hussein Dey

Stade El Menzah, Tunis

ES Tunis qualified to the final tournament.

=== Zone 4 (East Region) ===
Matches held in Homs

Al-Jaish (Syria)	0 – 0	(Jordan) Al-Faisaly

Khalid ibn al-Walid Stadium, Homs

Safa (Lebanon)	–	(Palestine) Hilal Al-Quds

Khalid ibn al-Walid Stadium, Homs

Al-Jaish (Syria)	2 – 0	(Palestine) Hilal Al-Quds

Khalid ibn al-Walid Stadium, Homs

Al-Faisaly (Jordan)	–	(Lebanon) Safa

Khalid ibn al-Walid Stadium, Homs

Al-Jaish (Syria)	2 – 1	(Lebanon) Safa

Khalid ibn al-Walid Stadium, Homs

Al-Faisaly (Jordan)	–	(Palestine) Hilal Al-Quds

Khalid ibn al-Walid Stadium, Homs

Al-Jaish qualified to the final tournament.

== Final tournament ==
Team	Pld	W	D	L	GF	GA	GD	Pts
(Iraq) Al-Rasheed	4	4	0	0	7	2	+5	8
(Tunisia) ES Tunis	4	2	1	1	2	1	+1	5
(Saudi Arabia) Al-Hilal	4	1	2	1	3	3	0	4
(Kuwait) Al-Arabi	4	1	1	2	2	3	−1	3
(Syria) Al-Jaish	4	0	0	4	3	8	−5	0

11 November 1986

Al-Rasheed (Iraq)	1 – 0	(Kuwait) Al-Arabi
Mohammed (...)

Stade El Menzah, Tunis

Al-Hilal (Saudi Arabia)	2 – 1	(Syria) Al-Jaish

Stade El Menzah, Tunis

14 November 1986

Al-Jaish (Syria)	1 – 3	(Iraq) Al-Rasheed
		(...) Qais (...) Shaker

Stade El Menzah, Tunis

ES Tunis (Tunisia)	0 – 0	(Saudi Arabia) Al-Hilal

Stade El Menzah, Tunis

Al-Hilal (Saudi Arabia)	0 – 0	(Kuwait) Al-Arabi

Stade El Menzah, Tunis

Al-Jaish (Syria)	0 – 1	(Tunisia) ES Tunis

Stade El Menzah, Tunis

19 November 1986

Al-Rasheed (Iraq)	2 – 1	(Saudi Arabia) Al-Hilal
Radhi 50'; Jassim 89'		40' Al-Dossari

Stade El Menzah, Tunis
Referee: Mohamed Hossam Eddin (Egypt)

ES Tunis (Tunisia)	1 – 0	(Kuwait) Al-Arabi

Stade El Menzah, Tunis

Al-Jaish (Syria)	1 – 2	(Kuwait) Al-Arabi

Stade El Menzah, Tunis
22 November 1986

Al-Rasheed (Iraq)	1 – 0	(Tunisia) ES Tunis
Shaker 45' (pen.)

Stade El Menzah, Tunis
Referee: Abdelali Naciri (Morocco)

== Winner ==
1986 Arab Club Champions Cup
winners

2nd title
