= Laith Hussein =

Iraqi footballer (born 1968)

Personal information
- Full name: Laith Hussein Shihaib
- Date of birth: 13 October 1968 (age 58)
- Place of birth: Baghdad, Iraq
- Position: Central midfielder

Youth career
- 1983–1984: Al-Umal SC
- 1984–1985: Al-Zawraa

Senior career*
Years	Team	Apps	(Gls)
1985–1987	Al-Zawraa		
1987–1990	Al Rasheed		
1990–1993	Al-Zawraa		
1993–1997	Al-Rayyan SC		
1997	Al Wakrah		
1997–2000	Al Ansar		
2000–2003	Al-Zawraa		

International career
1986–2002	Iraq	80	(22)
- * Club domestic league appearances and goals

Laith Hussein Shihaib Al-Tawlid (Arabic: ليث حسين شهيب التولد; born 13 October 1968) is an Iraqi former football player who played as a midfielder and served as the captain of the Iraqi national team. He was vital to speaking out against Uday Hussein, the chairman of the Iraqi Olympic Committee, who was known for his brutality against the football team.

== International career ==
Hussein made his international debut at the age of 17 in 1986. He played in the 1988 Olympics in Seoul and helped Iraq win the Asian Youth Championship in Doha. In the World Youth Cup in Saudi Arabia a year later, Hussein was on the verge of joining Spanish giants Barcelona, after scoring one of the goals in a 2–0 win over Spain, helping Iraq to top their group, but was denied this move by then-president Saddam Hussein.

== Managerial career ==
Hussein was team manager of the Iraqi national team in 2013.

== Career statistics ==
=== International ===
Scores and results list Iraq's goal tally first.

#	Date	Venue	Opponent	Score	Result	Competition
1.	17 March 1988	King Fahd International Stadium, Riyadh	Bahrain	1–0	1–0	9th Arabian Gulf Cup
2.	3 November 1989	Al-Sadaqua Walsalam Stadium, Kuwait City	South Yemen	3–0	6–2	Friendly
3.	3 November 1989	Al-Sadaqua Walsalam Stadium, Kuwait City	South Yemen	4–0	6–2	Friendly
4.	28 February 1990	Jaber Al-Ahmad International Stadium	Kuwait	1–1	1–1	10th Arabian Gulf Cup
5.	18 August 1992	Al-Hassan Stadium, Irbid	Ethiopia	2–0	13–0	1992 Jordan Tournament
6.	18 August 1992	Al-Hassan Stadium, Irbid	Ethiopia	3–0	13–0	1992 Jordan Tournament
7.	26 May 1993	Irbid	Yemen	1–0	6–1	1994 FIFA World Cup qualification
8.	26 May 1993	Irbid	Pakistan	1–0	8–0	1994 FIFA World Cup qualification
9.	14 June 1993	Chengdu	Jordan	1–0	4–0	1994 FIFA World Cup qualification
10.	14 June 1993	Chengdu	Jordan	2–0	4–0	1994 FIFA World Cup qualification
11.	16 June 1993	Chengdu	Yemen	3–0	3–0	1994 FIFA World Cup qualification
12.	19 October 1993	Khalifa International Stadium, Doha	South Korea	2–2	2–2	1994 FIFA World Cup qualification
13.	24 November 1996	Stadio Luigi Ferraris, Genoa	Indonesia	3–0	4–0	Friendly
14.	11 December 1996	Al-Maktoum Stadium, Dubai	Thailand	2–0	4–1	1996 AFC Asian Cup
15.	11 December 1996	Al-Maktoum Stadium, Dubai	Thailand	4–1	4–1	1996 AFC Asian Cup
16.	23 May 1997	Railway Stadium, Lahore	Pakistan	3–1	6–2	1998 FIFA World Cup qualification
17.	20 June 1997	Al-Shaab Stadium, Baghdad	Pakistan	1–0	6–1	1998 FIFA World Cup qualification
18.	20 June 1997	Al-Shaab Stadium, Baghdad	Pakistan	2–0	6–1	1998 FIFA World Cup qualification
19.	21 August 1997	National Stadium, Beirut	Lebanon	1–0	2–0	Friendly
20.	21 August 1997	National Stadium, Beirut	Lebanon	2–0	2–0	Friendly
21.	17 August 2001	Al-Shaab Stadium, Baghdad	Thailand	4–0	4–0	2002 FIFA World Cup qualification
22.	11 January 2002	Saoud bin Abdulrahman Stadium, Al-Wakrah	Oman	2–0	2–0	Friendly

== Honours ==
Individual

- Lebanese Premier League Best Player: 1997–98
- Lebanese Premier League Team of the Season: 1997–98, 1998–99

Sporting positions
Preceded by Ahmed Radhi	Iraq captain 2003 - 2004	Succeeded by Emad Hashim
