= 1987–88 Iraqi National League =

Iraqi National League
- Season: 1987–88
- Champions: Al-Rasheed (2nd title)
- Asian Club Championship: Al-Rasheed
- Arab Club Champions Cup: Al-Rasheed; Al-Shabab
- Top goalscorer: Rahim Hameed (15 goals)

The 1987–88 Iraqi National Clubs First Division League was the 14th season of the competition since its foundation in 1974. Al-Rasheed won their second league title in a row, and also won the 1987–88 Iraq FA Cup to complete their second consecutive double.

== League table ==
Pos	Team	Pld	W	D	L	GF	GA	GD	Pts	Qualification
1	Al-Rasheed (C)	30	20	7	3	62	15	+47	47	Asian Club Championship qualifying round and Arab Club Champions Cup group stage
2	Al-Jaish	30	18	7	5	37	13	+24	43	
3	Al-Tayaran	30	18	5	7	42	26	+16	41	
4	Al-Shabab	30	12	13	5	31	17	+14	37	Arab Club Champions Cup preliminary round (Note: As holders, Al-Rasheed automatically qualified for the Arab Club Champions Cup meaning Iraq were given another slot in the competition. Although Al-Jaish were runners-up of the league and Al-Zawraa were runners-up of the FA Cup (both won by Al-Rasheed), the IFA decided to give the slot to the league's fourth-placed team Al-Shabab.)
5	Al-Zawraa	30	14	8	8	32	23	+9	36	
6	Al-Sinaa	30	10	14	6	26	21	+5	34	
7	Al-Naft	30	13	5	12	35	42	−7	31	
8	Al-Talaba	30	8	14	8	29	31	−2	30	
9	Al-Shorta	30	10	9	11	23	28	−5	29	
10	Al-Tijara	30	7	14	9	21	27	−6	28	
11	Al-Bahri	30	8	10	12	21	31	−10	26	
12	Al-Minaa	30	5	13	12	22	34	−12	23	
13	Salahaddin	30	4	14	12	28	33	−5	22	
14	Al-Mosul	30	4	12	14	18	34	−16	20	
15	Erbil	30	6	8	16	25	45	−20	20	
16	Al-Najaf	30	2	9	19	15	47	−32	13	

Source: Ali Al-Sabti Archive
(C) Champions

== Results ==
Home \ Away	BAH	JSH	MIN	MSL	NFT	NJF	RSH	SHB	SHR	SIN	TLB	TAY	TIJ	ZWR	ERB	SAL
Al-Bahri		2–0	0–1	2–1	0–1	0–0	0–3	1–2	0–0	0–0	2–2	1–1	0–1	2–1	1–3	1–0
Al-Jaish	1–0		4–0	1–0	2–2	2–0	0–0	0–0	1–2	0–1	2–1	1–2	2–0	2–0	1–0	1–1
Al-Minaa	0–0	0–2		0–0	0–2	1–1	1–3	0–0	0–1	3–2	1–1	1–2	0–0	1–0	1–2	1–1
Al-Mosul	1–1	0–0	0–2		3–1	0–1	0–3	0–1	1–0	1–1	3–1	0–0	2–1	0–0	1–1	0–0
Al-Naft	2–1	0–1	1–0	3–2		2–0	0–2	1–0	0–0	0–1	0–2	3–4	1–2	0–1	1–0	3–2
Al-Najaf	0–1	0–1	1–1	0–0	0–1		1–3	1–1	1–2	1–1	1–1	0–2	2–3	1–3	0–0	1–3
Al-Rasheed	4–0	1–0	1–1	3–1	0–1	5–0		1–0	4–0	0–1	0–1	0–0	1–0	1–1	4–1	1–1
Al-Shabab	1–0	0–0	2–0	1–0	0–1	3–0	0–1		2–1	0–0	0–0	1–1	1–0	3–0	3–1	1–1
Al-Shorta	1–2	1–1	0–0	2–0	0–1	1–1	0–3	2–2		1–0	0–0	0–1	0–0	0–0	2–1	2–1
Al-Sinaa	1–0	0–1	1–0	1–0	2–2	1–0	1–2	2–2	0–1		0–0	3–1	0–0	1–1	0–0	0–0
Al-Talaba	1–1	0–3	2–2	3–0	3–1	2–1	0–4	0–0	2–1	0–1		1–3	0–0	1–0	1–1	0–0
Al-Tayaran	2–0	0–1	1–0	1–1	6–1	1–0	0–3	0–2	1–0	1–0	2–1		2–1	0–1	2–1	1–0
Al-Tijara	0–0	0–2	1–4	0–0	3–1	1–0	1–1	0–0	1–0	0–0	0–0	1–0		0–1	2–2	2–2
Al-Zawraa	0–1	0–1	1–1	2–0	2–0	2–0	3–3	1–1	1–2	0–0	2–1	1–0	2–0		1–0	1–0
Erbil	0–1	0–2	2–0	1–0	3–3	0–1	0–3	1–2	1–0	2–2	0–2	0–2	0–0	0–2		2–1
Salahaddin	1–1	0–2	0–0	1–1	0–0	3–0	0–2	1–0	0–1	2–3	0–0	1–3	1–1	1–2	4–0	

Source: Ali Al-Sabti Archive
Legend: Blue = home team win; Yellow = draw; Red = away team win.

== Season statistics ==
=== Top scorers ===
Pos	Scorer	Goals	Team
1	Rahim Hameed	15	Al-Jaish
2	Tariq Abdul-Rahman	12	Erbil
3	Karim Hadi	11	Al-Shabab
4	Younis Abid Ali	10	Al-Rasheed

=== Hat-tricks ===
Player	For	Against	Result	Date
(Iraq) Tariq Abdul-Rahman	Erbil	Al-Naft	3–3	13 April 1988
