= 1985 Arab Club Champions Cup =

بطولة الأندية العربية لأبطال الدوري 1985

Tournament details
- Host country: Iraq
- City: Baghdad
- Dates: 5–9 December 1985
- Teams: 3 (from 1 association)
- Venue: 1 (in 1 host city)

Final positions
- Champions: (Iraq) Al-Rasheed SC (1st title)
- Runners-up: (Algeria) USM El Harrach
- Third place: (Lebanon) Nejmeh

Tournament statistics
- Matches played: 3
- Goals scored: 13 (4.33 per match)
- Top scorer(s): (Algeria) Abdelkader Meziani (3 goals)

The 1985 Arab Club Champions Cup took place in Baghdad, Iraq and featured three teams. Iraqi League representative Al-Rasheed took the championship back to Iraq.

== Participants ==
Participants
Zone	Team	Qualifying method
Zone 1	(Iraq) Al-Rasheed	Iraqi League representative
Zone 1	(Saudi Arabia) Al-Ahli	1983–84 Saudi Premier League winners
Zone 1	(Yemen Arab Republic) Al-Ahli Sana'a	1983–84 Yemeni League winners
Zone 2	(Lebanon) Nejmeh	1974–75 Lebanese Championship winners (no championship after 1975)
Zone 3	(Algeria) USM El Harrach	1983–84 Algerian Championship runners-up

== Qualifying round ==
=== Zone 1 ===
Preliminary round tournament held in Jeddah, Saudi Arabia.

Team	Pld	W	D	L	GF	GA	GD	Pts
(Iraq) Al-Rasheed	2	2	0	0	3	0	+3	4
(Saudi Arabia) Al-Ahli	2	1	0	1	2	1	+1	2
(Yemen) Al-Ahli Sana'a	2	0	0	2	0	4	−4	0

2 September 1985

Al-Ahli (Saudi Arabia)	0 – 1	(Iraq) Al-Rasheed
		Mohammed 64'

Al Ahli Club Stadium, Jeddah
Referee: Omar Al-Bashir (Sudan)
4 September 1985

Al-Rasheed (Iraq)	2 – 0^{1}	(Yemen) Al-Ahli Sana'a
Abid (–)		Jo'ra (–)

Al Ahli Club Stadium, Jeddah
Referee: Neji Jouini (Tunisia)

^{1} The match originally finished 1-1, but Al-Rasheed were awarded a 2-0 win as Al-Ahli Sana'a played a Sudanese player who was not registered according to competition rules.

6 September 1985

Al-Ahli (Saudi Arabia)	2 – 0	(Yemen) Al-Ahli Sana'a
Hussain

Al Ahli Club Stadium, Jeddah
Referee: Mohammed Al-Mawlood (Bahrain)

Al-Rasheed advanced to the final tournament.

=== Zone 2 ===
Nejmeh advanced to the final tournament.

=== Zone 3 ===
USM El Harrach advanced to the final tournament.

== Final tournament ==
Team	Pld	W	D	L	GF	GA	GD	Pts
(Iraq) Al-Rasheed	2	2	0	0	8	2	+6	4
(Algeria) USM El Harrach	2	1	0	1	4	2	+2	2
(Lebanon) Nejmeh	2	0	0	2	1	9	−8	0

5 December 1985

Al-Rasheed (Iraq)	6 – 1	(Lebanon) Nejmeh
Dirjal 8'; Abid 35', 71'; Saddam 38'; Hashim 76'; Allawi 89'		Chatila 79'

Al-Shaab Stadium, Baghdad
7 December 1985

Nejmeh (Lebanon)	0 – 3	(Algeria) USM El Harrach
		Meziani 17', 30'; Ould El-Hadj 66'

Al-Shaab Stadium, Baghdad
9 December 1985

USM El Harrach (Algeria)	1 – 2	(Iraq) Al-Rasheed
Meziani 44'		Allawi 26'; Radhi 85'

Al-Shaab Stadium, Baghdad

== Winner ==
1985 Arab Club Champions Cup
Winners

Al-Rasheed
1st Title
