= 1990 Arab Club Champions Cup =

بطولة الأندية العربية لأبطال الدوري 1990 Cancelled

The 1990 Arab Club Champions Cup is a tournament held between Arab clubs by UAFA. The preliminary round began, but the final tournament was cancelled because of the Gulf War.

== Preliminary round ==
There should have been four zones in the preliminary round, Gulf Area, Red Sea, North Africa, and East Region. The known results are as follows.

=== Zone 3 (North Africa) ===
| Team 1 | Agg. | Team 2 | 1st leg | 2nd leg |
|---|---|---|---|---|
| MC Alger (Algeria) | 2–1 | (Tunisia) Étoile du Sahel | 1–0 | 1–1 |

| MC Alger (Algeria) | 1 – 0 | (Tunisia) Étoile du Sahel |
|---|---|---|
| Maza (–) |

Stade 5 Juillet, Algiers

| Étoile du Sahel (Tunisia) | 1 – 1 | (Algeria) MC Alger |
|---|---|---|
| – (–) | | Guettouche (–) |

Stade Olympique de Sousse, Sousse

MC Alger advanced to the final tournament.

=== Zone 4 (East Region) ===
Preliminary round tournament held in Amman, Jordan from 7 to 15 July 1990.

| Team | Pld | W | D | L | GF | GA | GD | Pts |
|---|---|---|---|---|---|---|---|---|
| (Jordan) Al-Faisaly | 2 | 1 | 1 | 0 | 4 | 0 | +4 | 3 |
| (Iraq) Al-Zawra'a | 2 | 1 | 1 | 0 | 2 | 0 | +2 | 3 |
| (Palestine) Haifa SC | 2 | 0 | 0 | 2 | 0 | 6 | −6 | 0 |

7 July 1990

| Al-Faisaly (Jordan) | 4 – 0 | (Palestine) Haifa SC |

Amman International Stadium, Amman
11 July 1990

| Al-Faisaly (Jordan) | 0 – 0 | (Iraq) Al-Zawra'a |

Amman International Stadium, Amman
15 July 1990

| Al-Zawra'a (Iraq) | 2 – 0 | (Palestine) Haifa SC |
|---|---|---|
| Abdelwahed (–) |

Amman International Stadium, Amman

Al-Faisaly and Al-Zawra'a advanced to the final tournament.

== Final tournament ==
The final tournament was cancelled because of the Gulf War.
