= Al-Rasheed SC =

Iraqi football club

- Full name: Al-Rasheed Sports Club
- Founded: November 23, 1983
- Dissolved: August 18, 1990
- Ground: Al-Rasheed Stadium, Baghdad, Iraq
- Capacity: 6,000
- Final season; 1989–90: Iraqi National League, 2nd
Home colours	Away colours

Al-Rasheed Sports Club (Arabic: نادي الرشيد الرياضي) was an Iraqi sports club based in Karkh, Baghdad. Its professional football team played in what is now known as the Iraq Stars League, the top tier of the Iraqi football, from 1984 until 1990. The club's home stadium was Al-Rasheed Stadium.

Founded in 1983 by Uday Hussein, the son of Saddam Hussein, Al-Rasheed were promoted to the top tier in their first season of existence and went on to win 3 league titles in a row, 2 FA Cups, 3 Arab Champions Cup titles, and reach the final of the 1988–89 Asian Club Championship. In 1990, the club was dissolved and all its properties as well as its place in the top division were transferred to Al-Karkh SC.

== History ==
Taking the Al-Mansour Local Administration Stadium as his club's, on 23 November 1983, Uday Hussein founded a new sports club named Al-Rasheed. The team was put straight into the second division of Iraqi football by Uday. A few days after their foundation, they played their first match in the second division (Baghdad Group) and it was against Al-Karkh, the team that would replace them in the top-flight seven years later; Al-Rasheed won the game 4–0. They were promoted to what is now known as the Iraq Stars League in their first ever season, after achieving the 2nd Division title by beating Al-Najaf 1–0 in their final game. Uday Hussein brought most of the Iraq national team players into the club, managed by Ammo Baba, the head coach of the national team at the time. The most popular of them were Ahmed Radhi, Adnan Dirjal, Samir Shaker, Haris Mohammed, Habib Jafar, and Laith Hussein. Many of them, including Ahmed Radhi, were forced to join the club and had no choice in the matter. Uday Hussein was also known to punish players who did not perform up to standards by ordering his guards to beat them, and often forced them to completely shave their heads before matches to embarrass them in public. The club's taking of most of Iraq's best players as well as the fact that they made domestic football much less competitive made the team very unpopular among fans.

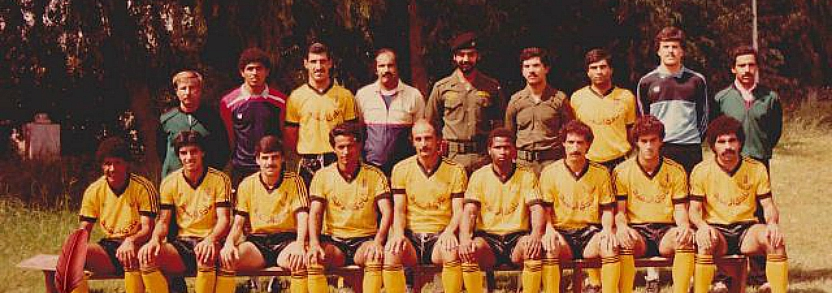
Squad of Al-Rasheed during the 1984–85 season, along with Uday and Qusay Hussein

Al-Rasheed dominated the Iraqi football from the club's foundation until its dissolving. In their first season in the top-flight, the 1984–85 season, Al-Rasheed were in 1st place, at 43 points, but because of the league being abandoned, no champions were announced. After the abandonment of the league, Al-Rasheed set up the Al-Rasheed Cup which contained 12 of the 14 Iraqi League teams as well as four lower division teams. Al-Rasheed won this tournament by beating Al-Zawra'a in the final. They participated in the 1985–86 Asian Club Championship but withdrew from the competition during the qualifiers. They finished 2nd in the 1985–86 Iraqi League, but won the 1986 Saddam International Tournament which contained teams from all around the world including Iraq, Brazil, Kenya, Jordan, Morocco and Kuwait. Being managed by Ammo Baba, they achieved the league in the 1986–87 season, along with the Iraq FA Cup, after beating Al-Jaish. In the 1987 Asian Club Championship they were knocked out in the final group stage. Another double success came under the management of Jamal Salih in the 1987–88 season. In the 1988–89 season, Al-Rasheed achieved the league to be their last ever achievement. Al-Rasheed became the first team to win the league three times in the row since it started in 1974.

Al-Rasheed also achieved the Arab Champions Cup three times in the row; defeating USM El Harrach in 1985 in Al-Shaab Stadium, ES Tunis in 1986 in Stade El Menzah, and beating Al-Ittihad in the final of 1987 in Prince Faisal bin Fahd Stadium. Al-Rasheed also finished third in the 1989 Arab Cup Winners' Cup. Al-Rasheed's biggest achievement in AFC competitions is that they reached the 2nd place of the 1988–89 Asian Club Championship, after losing by the away goal rule to Al Sadd. They were the first Iraqi team to reach the final of Asia's main club competition since Aliyat Al-Shorta in 1971. In the next edition of the Asian Club Championship in 1989–90, Al-Rasheed were very close to reaching the final again, but they failed to. They also failed to win the league title, and they failed to win the cup as they were surprisingly knocked out by lower division team Al-Tijara 3–2 on aggregate. Therefore, they ended the season without winning a trophy.

On 18 August 1990, the Iraqi Olympic Committee decided to dissolve Al-Rasheed Sports Club and transfer all of its properties to Al-Karkh Sports Club and replacing Al-Rasheed with Al-Karkh in what is now known as the Iraq Stars League. It is believed that the decision to dissolve the club was made by Saddam Hussein, due to Saddam being fed up that the club was very unpopular among supporters and players, and fans often chanted against the team.

== Stadium ==
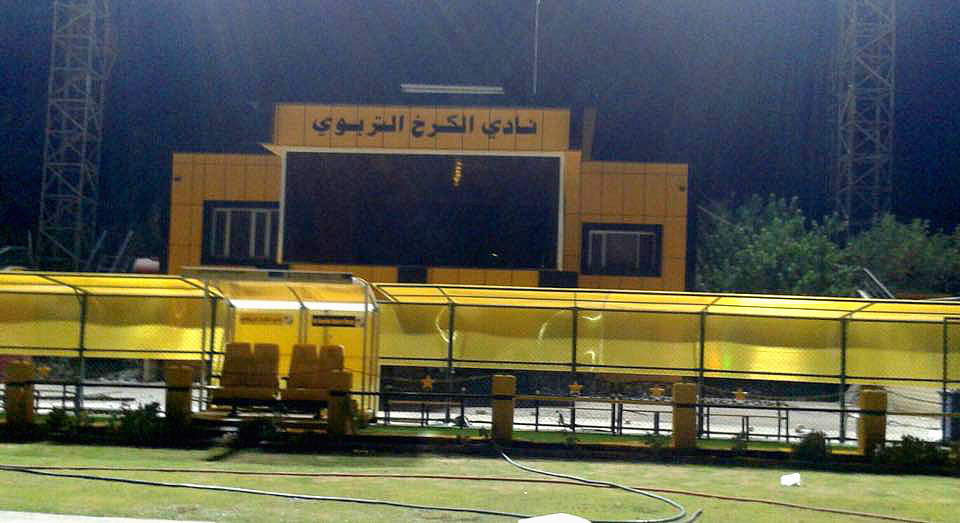
Al-Karkh Stadium at night in 2014

In 1984, Al-Rasheed took over the Al-Mansour Local Administration Stadium and turned it into theirs after renovating it and allowing shops to be opened around it. In the dissolving of Al-Rasheed, the stadium was renamed Al-Karkh Stadium as the stadium of Al-Karkh SC.

== Statistics ==
=== In domestic competitions ===
Year	League	Iraq Cup	Super Cup
1983–84	Promoted (Div. 1)	-	Started in 1986
1984–85	not finished	not finished	Started in 1986
1985–86	Runner-up	not held	Winner
1986–87	Winner	Winner	not held
1987–88	Winner	Winner	not held
1988–89	Winner	Semi-final	not held
1989–90	Runner-up	Round of 16	not held

=== In Asia ===
On July 26, 1990, the second-to-last month of the club's existence:

Competition	Record				
Competition	G	W	D	L	Win %
Asian Club Championship	25	16	5	4	64.00
Total	25	16	5	4	64.00

== Honours ==
=== Major ===
Type	Competition	Titles	Seasons
Domestic	Iraq Stars League	3	1986–87, 1987–88, 1988–89
Domestic	Iraqi Premier Division League (second tier)	1	1983–84
Domestic	Iraq FA Cup	2	1986–87, 1987–88
Domestic	Iraqi Super Cup	1	1986
International	Arab Club Champions Cup	3^{s}	1985, 1986, 1987

- record
- ^{S} shared record

=== Minor ===
Competition	Titles	Seasons
Uday Saddam Hussein Championship	1	1988
Saddam International Tournament	1	1986
Al-Rasheed Cup	1	1985

== Other sports ==
=== Basketball ===
- Iraqi Basketball Premier League:
  - Champions (5): 1985–86, 1986–87, 1987–88, 1988–89, 1989–90
- Arab Club Basketball Championship:
  - Champions (2): 1988, 1990

=== Volleyball ===
- Arab Clubs Championship (volleyball):
  - Champions (1): 1989
