= Haris Mohammed =

Iraqi footballer

Haris Mohammed Hassan
Personal information
- Full name: Haris Mohammed Hassan
- Date of birth: 3 March 1958 (age 68)
- Place of birth: Iraq
- Height: 1.65 m (5 ft 5 in)
- Position: Midfielder

Senior career*
Years	Team	Apps	(Gls)
1974–1978	Al Mosul		
1978–1982	Al Talaba		
1982–1983	Al Shabab		
1983–1984	Al Jaish		
1984–1988	Al Rasheed		
1988–1989	Al Talaba		
1989–1993	Al Mosul		

International career
1978	Iraq U19	6	(7)
1979–1988	Iraq	90	(7)
- * Club domestic league appearances and goals

Haris Mohammed Hassan (Arabic: حَارِس مُحَمَّد حَسَن; born 3 March 1958) is an Iraqi football midfielder who played for Iraq in the 1986 FIFA World Cup. He also played for Al-Rasheed Club.

Haris Mohammed was a skilful and creative right sided attacking midfielder, born and bred in Mosul. He started to hone his skills on the streets, frequently annoying the neighbours. After realising his potential on the football field, he played for the school province football team under the supervision of coach Dawud Azzawi.

He earned reputation as a goalscorer with the Iraqi youth team winning the 1978 Asian Youth Championship in Bangladesh, he joined Talaba SC, helping them to two league titles while at the club. He had the most success while at Al-Rasheed, winning three leagues, two cups and a record three Arab Club Championships. In 1987, in the Arab Club Championship held in Saudi Arabia, Haris was top scorer with 7 goals helping the club to a record 3rd title.

Haris was part of the Iraqi team that won the 1982 Asian Games and he also played for Iraq in the 1984 Olympics and the 1986 World Cup. He returned to Mosul in 1991, where he later retired.

He currently works as a pundit for beIN Sports.

== Career statistics ==
=== International goals ===
Scores and results list Iraq's goal tally first.

No	Date	Venue	Opponent	Score	Result	Competition
1.	20 November 1982	Jawaharlal Nehru Stadium, New Delhi	Burma	4–0	4–0	1982 Asian Games
2.	1 December 1982	Jawaharlal Nehru Stadium, New Delhi	Saudi Arabia	1–0	1–0	1982 Asian Games
3.	20 September 1985	Al-Rashid Stadium, Dubai	United Arab Emirates	2–3	2–3	1986 FIFA World Cup qualification
4.	23 September 1986	Daegu Stadium, Daegu	Pakistan	3–1	5–1	1986 Asian Games
5.	23 September 1986	Daegu Stadium, Daegu	Pakistan	5–1	5–1	1986 Asian Games
6.	27 September 1986	Daegu Stadium, Daegu	Thailand	2–1	2–1	1986 Asian Games
7.	1 October 1986	Seoul Olympic Stadium, Seoul	Saudi Arabia	1–1	1–1	1986 Asian Games
