= Iraq national football team results (1957–1969) =

This is a list of the Iraq national football team results from 1957 to 1969.

== Results ==
Win Draw Loss Fixtures

=== 1950s ===
1957

19 October 1957 1957 Arab Games	Morocco	3–3	Iraq	Beirut, Lebanon
	El-Madani; Benchekroun (pen.)		Baba 48'; Eshaya 50'; Salman 63'

21 October 1957 1957 Arab Games	Tunisia	4–2	Iraq	Beirut, Lebanon
	Diwa; Farzit; Hénia		Abbas (pen.); David

23 October 1957 1957 Arab Games	Iraq	3–1	Libya	Beirut, Lebanon
	Baba; Eshaya; Abdul-Majid		El-Shualia

1959

15 November 1959 1960 Olympics qualification	Lebanon	0–3	Iraq	Beirut, Lebanon
			Baba 2', 70'; Abdullah 85'

25 November 1959 1960 Olympics qualification	Iraq	8–0	Lebanon	Baghdad, Iraq
	Baba 5', 27'; Abdullah 17', 40', 50', 85'; Salih 58', 88'

6 December 1959 1960 Olympics qualification	Turkey	7–1	Iraq	Adana, Turkey
	Yalçınkaya 14', 72'; Şensan 37', 61', 87'; Güneş 54'; Köken 74'		Baba 12'

13 December 1959 1960 Olympics qualification	Iraq	2–3	Turkey	Baghdad, Iraq
	Baba 35', 52'		Güneş 20'; Atakan 60'; Yalçınkaya 65'

=== 1960s ===
1962

31 May 1962 Friendly	Iran	1–1	Iraq	Tehran, Iran
	Kouzehkanani 90'		Abbas 47' (pen.)	Stadium: Amjadieh Stadium

2 June 1962 Friendly	Iran	1–2	Iraq	Tehran, Iran
	Kouzehkanani		Ismail 47'; Hameed 60'	Stadium: Amjadieh Stadium

1963

13 December 1963 1964 Olympics qualifiers	Iran	4–0	Iraq	Tehran, Iran
	Shirzadegan; Arab			Stadium: Amjadieh Stadium

1964

2 January 1964 1964 Olympics qualifiers	Iraq	0–0	Iran	Baghdad, Iraq
				Stadium: Al-Kashafa Stadium

13 November 1964 1964 Arab Cup	Kuwait	0–1	Iraq	Kuwait City, Kuwait
			Ismail 60'	Stadium: National Stadium

15 November 1964 1964 Arab Cup	Iraq	1–0	Lebanon	Kuwait City, Kuwait
	Tabra 67'			Stadium: National Stadium

17 November 1964 1964 Arab Cup	Iraq	1–1	Libya	Kuwait City, Kuwait
	Atta 70'		Goal	Stadium: National Stadium

19 November 1964 1964 Arab Cup	Iraq	3–1	Jordan	Kuwait City, Kuwait
	Atta 14', 40'; Mahmoud 30'		Al-Banna	Stadium: National Stadium

1965

30 July 1965 Friendly	Jordan	0–0	Iraq	Amman, Jordan
				Stadium: Amman International Stadium

22 August 1965 Friendly	Iraq	0–0	Lebanon	Cairo, United Arab Republic
				Stadium: Cairo International Stadium

4 September 1965 1965 Arab Games	Iraq	6–0	Aden	Cairo, United Arab Republic
	Ammo Baba; Atta; Hameed			Stadium: Cairo International Stadium

6 September 1965 1965 Arab Games	Iraq	0–0	Lebanon	Cairo, United Arab Republic
				Stadium: Cairo International Stadium

7 September 1965 1965 Arab Games	Palestine	1–1	Iraq	Cairo, United Arab Republic
			Dawood	Stadium: Cairo International Stadium

8 September 1965 1965 Arab Games	United Arab Republic	1–0	Iraq	Cairo, United Arab Republic
	El-Gohary 5'			Stadium: Cairo International Stadium

1966

11 March 1966 1966 Tripoli Fair Tournament	Iraq	2–0	Tunisia	Tripoli, Libya
	Atta 30'; Dhiab 70'

15 March 1966 1966 Tripoli Fair Tournament	Morocco	1–0	Iraq	Tripoli, Libya

18 March 1966 1966 Tripoli Fair Tournament	Libya	0–2	Iraq	Tripoli, Libya
			Mahmoud; Dhiab

19 March 1966 1966 Tripoli Fair Tournament	Morocco	2–1	Iraq	Tripoli, Libya
			Balah

1 April 1966 1966 Arab Cup	Iraq	3–1	Kuwait	Baghdad, Iraq
	Yousif; Dhiab; Atta			Stadium: Al-Kashafa Stadium

2 April 1966 1966 Arab Cup	Iraq	2–1	Jordan	Baghdad, Iraq
	Assad; Atta		Al-Shaqran	Stadium: Al-Kashafa Stadium

5 April 1966 1966 Arab Cup	Iraq	10–1	Bahrain	Baghdad, Iraq
	Dhiab; Jameel; Ismail; Najim; Hameed; Dawood			Stadium: Al-Kashafa Stadium

7 April 1966 1966 Arab Cup	Iraq	0–0	Lebanon	Baghdad, Iraq
				Stadium: Al-Kashafa Stadium

9 April 1966 1966 Arab Cup	Iraq	3–1	Libya	Baghdad, Iraq
	Mahmoud; Balla; Atta		Al-Baski	Stadium: Al-Kashafa Stadium

10 April 1966 1966 Arab Cup	Iraq	2–1	Syria	Baghdad, Iraq
	Ismail 68', 84'		Nureddin 27'	Stadium: Al-Kashafa Stadium; Attendance: 20,000; Referee: Mamdouh Khourma (Jordan)

1967

12 February 1967 Friendly	Iraq	1–1	East Germany	Baghdad, Iraq
	Ismail			Stadium: Al-Shaab Stadium

10 March 1967 1967 Tripoli Fair Tournament	Sudan	2–2	Iraq	Tripoli, Libya
			Khoshaba 7'; Baba 57'	Stadium: June 11 Stadium

12 March 1967 1967 Tripoli Fair Tournament	Libya	0–1	Iraq	Tripoli, Libya
			Ismail 31'	Stadium: June 11 Stadium

1968

14 January 1968 1968 Olympics qualifiers	Thailand	0–4	Iraq	Bangkok, Thailand
			Dhiab 3', 33'; Atta 26'; Nouri 59'	Stadium: Supachalasai Stadium; Attendance: 7,395; Referee: Norman Boswell (Malaysia)

16 January 1968 1968 Olympics qualifiers	Indonesia	2–1	Iraq	Bangkok, Thailand
	Hong 32'; Sihasale 52'		Dhiab 54'	Stadium: Supachalasai Stadium; Attendance: 5,067; Referee: Govindasamy Suppiah (Singapore)

20 January 1968 1968 Olympics qualifiers	Thailand	2–1	Iraq	Bangkok, Thailand
	Srisawat 23'; Sornbutnark 62'		Dhiab 50'	Stadium: Supachalasai Stadium; Attendance: 11,297; Referee: Dau Van Dzu (South Vietnam)

22 January 1968 1968 Olympics qualifiers	Iraq	1–1	Indonesia	Bangkok, Thailand
	Dhiab 60'		Soentoro 22'	Stadium: Supachalasai Stadium; Attendance: 5,679; Referee: Norman Boswell (Malaysia)

13 December 1968 Friendly	Iraq	1–1	United Arab Republic	Baghdad, Iraq
	Aziz			Stadium: Al-Shaab Stadium

1969

7 March 1969 1969 Friendship Cup	Iran	2–1	Iraq	Tehran, Iran
	Ghelichkhani; Eftekhari		Dhiab 16'	Stadium: Amjadieh Stadium; Referee: Zahurul Alam (Pakistan)

10 March 1969 1969 Friendship Cup	Iraq	1–2	Pakistan	Tehran, Iran
	Yousif 57'		Nawaz 59'; Jabbar 90'	Stadium: Amjadieh Stadium; Attendance: 7,000; Referee: Arshad Barazandeh (Iran)

13 November 1969 Friendly	Iraq	1–2	United Arab Republic	Baghdad, Iraq
	Aziz			Stadium: Al-Shaab Stadium

8 December 1969 Friendly	Iraq	1–1	East Germany	Baghdad, Iraq
	Yousif 36'	Report	Körner 23'	Stadium: Al-Shaab Stadium; Referee: Abdul Karim Saadi Salih (Iraq)

== See also ==
- Iraq national football team results
