= 1966 Tripoli Fair Tournament =

Tournament details
- Host country: Libya
- Dates: 11–19 March 1966
- Teams: 4 (from 2 confederations)
- Venue: 1 (in 1 host city)

Final positions
- Champions: Morocco B (1st title)
- Runners-up: Iraq

Tournament statistics
- Matches played: 7
- Goals scored: 13 (1.86 per match)

The 1966 Tripoli Fair Tournament was the 5th edition of football at the Tripoli International Fair, and was held from 11 to 19 March 1966 in Tripoli, Libya. Four teams participated: Iraq, Morocco, Libya, and Tunisia. Morocco won the tournament after beating Iraq 2–1 in the playoff match.

== Matches ==
Pos	Team	Pld	W	D	L	GF	GA	GD	Pts	
1	Iraq	3	2	0	1	4	1	+3	4	Playoff
2	Morocco B	3	2	0	1	2	4	−2	4	Playoff
3	Libya	3	1	1	1	4	2	+2	3	
4	Tunisia	3	0	1	2	0	3	−3	1	

11 March 1966

Iraq	2–0	Tunisia
Atta 30'; Dhiab 70'	Report

12 March 1966

Libya	4–0	Morocco B
Al-Biski; Ben Soueid	Report

14 March 1966

Libya	0–0	Tunisia
	Report

15 March 1966

Morocco B	1–0	Iraq
	Report

18 March 1966

Libya	0–2	Iraq
	Report	Mahmoud; Dhiab

18 March 1966

Tunisia	0–1	Morocco B
	Report

=== Playoff ===
19 March 1966

Morocco B	2–1	Iraq
	Report	Balah
