= Iraq national football team results =

A list of Iraq national football team results:

== Summary ==
As of 31 March 2026.

Year	GP	W	D	L	Win %	Matches
1957–1969	43	17	14	12	39.53	Matches
1970–1979	119	64	31	24	53.78	Matches
1980–1989	148	80	37	31	54.05	Matches
1990–1999	60	35	16	9	58.33	Matches
2000–2009	143	55	42	46	38.46	Matches
2010–2019	170	69	48	53	40.59	Matches
2020–present	76	36	23	17	47.37	Matches
Total	759	356	211	192	46.90	—

== Results ==
- Iraq national football team results (1957–1969)
- Iraq national football team results (1970–1979)
- Iraq national football team results (1980–1989)
- Iraq national football team results (1990–1999)
- Iraq national football team results (2000–2009)
- Iraq national football team results (2010–2019)
- Iraq national football team results (2020–present)
- Iraq national football team results (unofficial matches)
