= 1969 Friendship Cup =

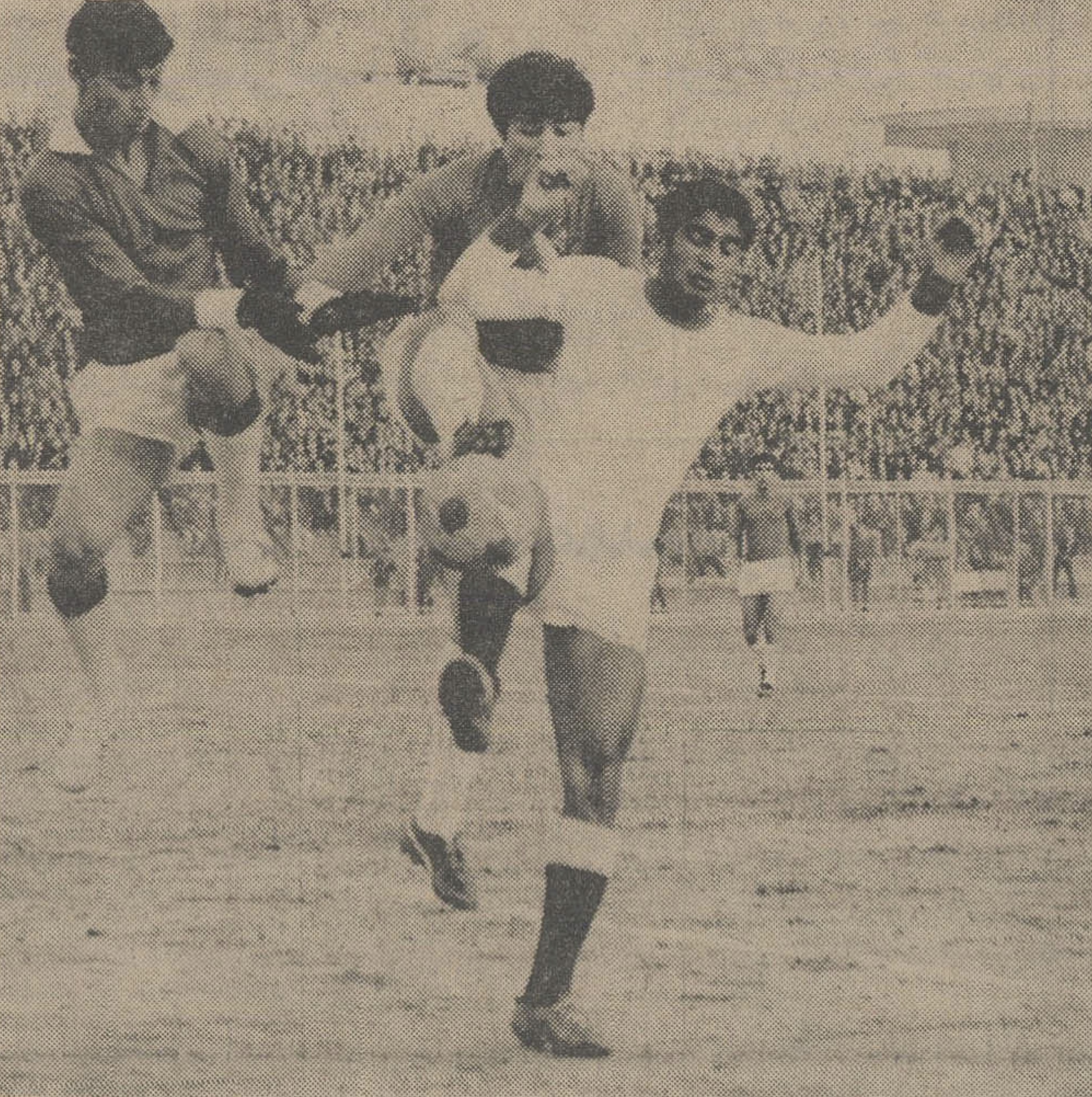
- Iran vs Pakistan at the 1969 Friendship Cup

Tournament details
- Country: Iran
- Venue(s): Amjadiyeh Stadium, Tehran
- Dates: 5–14 March 1969
- Teams: 5

Final positions
- Champions: FC Spartak Moscow (1st title)
- Runners-up: Iran
- Third place: Mersin İdman Yurdu

Tournament statistics
- Matches played: 20
- Goals scored: 36 (1.8 per match)
- Attendance: 137,000 (6,850 per match)
- Top goal scorer(s): (Iran) Gholam Vafakhah (Soviet Union) Vladimir Proskurin (4 goals)

The 1969 Friendship Cup was a friendly international football tournament held in Tehran, Iran. The tournament was held in honour of Shah Reza Pahlavi's birthday. It was the first edition of the Friendship Cup. In which, five teams participated in a round-robin format, with FC Spartak Moscow winning the tournament.

== Venue ==
Tehran is located in Iran	Tehran
Tehran is located in Iran	Amjadieh Stadium
Tehran is located in Iran	Capacity: 30,000

== Participating teams ==
- Iran
- (Soviet Union) FC Spartak Moscow
- (Turkey) Mersin İdman Yurdu
- Iraq
- Pakistan

== Results ==
Pos	Team	P	W	D	L	GF	GA	GD	Pts
1	(Soviet Union) Spartak Moscow	4	4	0	0	11	0	+11	8
2	Iran	4	3	0	1	13	5	+8	6
3	(Turkey) Mersin İdman Yurdu	4	2	0	2	6	5	+1	4
4	Pakistan	4	1	0	3	4	19	−15	2
5	Iraq	4	0	0	4	2	7	−5	0

== Matches ==
5 March 1969

FC Spartak Moscow (Soviet Union)	2–0	Iraq
Khusainov 51'; Lovchev 61'	Report

Amjadieh Stadium, Tehran
Attendance: 15,000
Referee: Abolghasem Haj Abolhasan (Iran)

6 March 1969

Mersin İdman Yurdu (Turkey)	4–1	Pakistan
Olcay Başarır 6'; Arpacıoğlu 20' (pen.); Aytaç 75'; Ayhan Öz 79'	Report	Hafiz Uddin 86'

Amjadieh Stadium, Tehran
Attendance: 5,000
Referee: Sobhi Adeeb (Iraq)

7 March 1969

Iran	2–1	Iraq
Ghelichkhani 29'; Eftekhari 66'	Report	Dhiab 16'

Amjadieh Stadium, Tehran
Attendance: 25,000
Referee: Z. Alam (Pakistan)

8 March 1969

FC Spartak Moscow (Soviet Union)	5–0	Pakistan
Logofet 15' (pen.); Olshansky 38', 64'; Proskurin 43', 68'	Report

Amjadieh Stadium, Tehran
Attendance: 10,000
Referee: Abolghasem Haj Abolhasan (Iran)

9 March 1969

Iran	2–1	(Turkey) Mersin İdman Yurdu
Vafakhah 19', 47'	Report	Olcay Başarır 68'

Amjadieh Stadium, Tehran
Attendance: 25,000
Referee: Z. Alam (Pakistan)

10 March 1969

Pakistan	2–1	Iraq
Nawaz 59'; Jabbar 90'	Report	Yousif 57'

Amjadieh Stadium, Tehran
Attendance: 7,000
Referee: Arshad Barazandeh (Iran)

11 March 1969

FC Spartak Moscow (Soviet Union)	2–0	(Turkey) Mersin İdman Yurdu
Ambartsumyan 79'; Proskurin 86'	Report

Amjadieh Stadium, Tehran
Attendance: 10,000
Referee: Davood Nasiri (Iran)

12 March 1969

Iran	9–1	Pakistan
Jabbari 26', 32', 39'; Vafakhah 30', 34'; Mostafavi 48'; Sharafi 55'; Ghelichkhani 60' (pen.); Mansour Zarabi 62'	Report	Dar 61'

Amjadieh Stadium, Tehran
Attendance: 15,000
Referee: Davoud Heidari (Iran)

13 March 1969

Mersin İdman Yurdu (Turkey)	1–0	Iraq
Ali Açıkgöz 20'	Report

Amjadieh Stadium, Tehran
Attendance: 5,000
Referee: Davood Nasiri (Iran)

14 March 1969

FC Spartak Moscow (Soviet Union)	2–0	Iran
Viktor Borovikov 15'; Proskurin 66'	Report

Amjadieh Stadium, Tehran
Attendance: 25,000
Referee: Z. Alam (Pakistan)

== Top scorers ==
Rank	Player	Team	Goals
1	(Soviet Union) Vladimir Proskurin	FC Spartak Moscow	4
1	(Iran) Gholam Vafakhah	Iran	4
3	(Iran) Ali Jabbari	Iran	3
4	(Iran) Parviz Ghelichkhani	Iran	2
4	(Turkey) Olcay Başarır	Mersin İdman Yurdu	2
4	(Soviet Union) Sergei Olshansky	FC Spartak Moscow	2
7	multiple players		1
