= 2003 LG Cup =

2003 LG Cup may refer to:

- 2003 LG Cup (Nigeria), an exhibition association football tournament, 30 May – 1 June in Nigeria
- 2003 LG Cup (Iran), an exhibition association football tournament, 13–15 August in Tehran
- 2003 LG Cup (snooker), the World Open, 4–12 October in Preston, England
