= Iraq national football team results (2000–2009) =

This is a list of the Iraq national football team results from 2000 to 2009.

== Results ==
Win Draw Loss Fixtures

=== 2000 ===
23 May 2000 2000 WAFF	Iraq	2–1	Lebanon	Amman, Jordan
20:30	Obeid 63' (pen.); Fawzi 66'		Zein 15'	Stadium: King Abdullah Stadium

25 May 2000 2000 WAFF	Jordan	0–0	Iraq	Amman, Jordan
20:30				Stadium: King Abdullah Stadium

27 May 2000 2000 WAFF	Iraq	4–0	Kyrgyzstan	Amman, Jordan
17:30	Farhan 28', 35', 75'; Mohammed 67'			Stadium: King Abdullah Stadium

31 May 2000 2000 WAFF	Syria	0–0 (a.e.t.) (5–3 p)	Iraq	Amman, Jordan
17:30				Stadium: King Abdullah Stadium

2 June 2000 2000 WAFF	Iraq	4–1	Jordan	Amman, Jordan
17:30	Farhan 16', 74'; Kadhim 30'; Hadi 37'		Tadrus 48'	Stadium: King Abdullah Stadium

1 September 2000 2000 Four Nations Tournament	Iraq	2–0	Uzbekistan	Shanghai, China
	Hamad 48'; Hadi 56'	Report		Stadium: Shanghai Stadium; Attendance: 35,000

4 September 2000 2000 Four Nations Tournament	China	4–1	Iraq	Shanghai, China
			Mohammed 57'	Stadium: Shanghai Stadium

12 October 2000 2000 AFC Asian Cup	Iraq	2–0	Thailand	Sidon, Lebanon
15:00	Chathir 27'; Mahmoud 60'	Report		Stadium: Saida Municipal Stadium; Attendance: 2,500; Referee: Toru Kamikawa (Japan)

15 October 2000 2000 AFC Asian Cup	Lebanon	2–2	Iraq	Beirut, Lebanon
19:45	Chahrour 28'; Hojeij 76'	Report	Jeayer 5', 22'	Stadium: Sports City Stadium; Attendance: 30,000; Referee: Kim Young-Joo (Korea Republic)

18 October 2000 2000 AFC Asian Cup	Iran	1–0	Iraq	Sidon, Lebanon
19:30	Daei 77'	Report		Stadium: Saida Municipal Stadium; Attendance: 8,582; Referee: Omer Al-Mehannah (Saudi Arabia)

24 October 2000 2000 AFC Asian Cup	Japan	4–1	Iraq	Beirut, Lebanon
16:45	Nanami 8', 29'; Takahara 11'; Myojin 62'	Report	Obeid 4'	Stadium: Sports City Stadium; Attendance: 2,000; Referee: Tajaddin Fares (Syria)

=== 2001 ===
31 January 2001 Friendly	Lebanon	0–0	Iraq	Beirut, Lebanon
				Stadium: National Stadium

12 April 2001 2002 WCQ	Iraq	8–0	Macau	Baghdad, Iraq
19:15 UTC+3	Hesham 21', 31', 33', 35', 76'; Jeayer 60', 83'; Kadhim 88'	Report		Stadium: Al-Shaab Stadium; Attendance: 45,000; Referee: Panya Hanlumyaung (Thailand)

14 April 2001 2002 WCQ	Nepal	1–9	Iraq	Baghdad, Iraq
19:15 UTC+3	Rayamajhi 25'	Report	Al-Hail 6' (pen.), 20' (pen.); Hesham 15', 59'; Jafar 21'; Najim 36'; Emad 55'; Kadhim 65', 75'	Stadium: Al-Shaab Stadium; Attendance: 25,000; Referee: Huang Junjie (China)

16 April 2001 2002 WCQ	Kazakhstan	1–1	Iraq	Baghdad, Iraq
19:15 UTC+3	Baltiev 6'	Report	Al-Hail 31' (pen.)	Stadium: Al-Shaab Stadium; Attendance: 50,000; Referee: Kim Tae-Young (South Korea)

21 April 2001 2002 WCQ	Macau	0–5	Iraq	Almaty, Kazakhstan
19:00 UTC+7		Report	Al-Hail 45', 80'; Hassan 57', 90'; Obeid 88'	Stadium: Almaty Central Stadium; Attendance: 8,000; Referee: Mongkol Rungklay (Thailand)

23 April 2001 2002 WCQ	Iraq	4–2	Nepal	Almaty, Kazakhstan
19:00 UTC+7	Obeid 27'; Al-Hail 30'; E.Mohammed 33'; Mushraf 54'	Report	Khadka 37'; Rayamajhi 63'	Stadium: Almaty Central Stadium; Attendance: 5,000; Referee: Subkhiddin Mohd Salleh (Malaysia)

25 April 2001 2002 WCQ	Iraq	1–1	Kazakhstan	Almaty, Kazakhstan
19:00 UTC+7	Mahmoud 42'	Report	Litvinenko 32'	Stadium: Almaty Central Stadium; Attendance: 25,000; Referee: Mongkol Rungklay (Thailand)

29 July 2001 Friendly	Oman	1–0	Iraq	Muscat, Oman
	Bashir 53'			Stadium: Sultan Qaboos Sports Complex

2 August 2001 Friendly	United Arab Emirates	2–2	Iraq	Abu Dhabi, United Arab Emirates
	Juma 67'; Salem 78'		H.Mohammed 44'; E.Mohammed 57'	Stadium: Al Nahyan Stadium

17 August 2001 2002 WCQ	Iraq	4–0	Thailand	Baghdad, Iraq
20:00 UTC+4	H.Mohammed 23', 76'; E.Mohammed 70'; Hussein 86'	Report		Stadium: Al-Shaab Stadium; Attendance: 20,000; Referee: Masayoshi Okada (Japan)

23 August 2001 2002 WCQ	Bahrain	2–0	Iraq	Manama, Bahrain
18:30 UTC+3	Yousef 58'; Al Kuwari 82'	Report		Stadium: Bahrain National Stadium; Attendance: 35,000; Referee: Khaled Dalu (Syria)

31 August 2001 2002 WCQ	Saudi Arabia	1–0	Iraq	Manama, Bahrain
20:30 UTC+3	Al-Dosari 45'	Report		Stadium: Bahrain National Stadium; Attendance: 10,000; Referee: Lu Jun (China)

7 September 2001 2002 WCQ	Iraq	1–2	Iran	Baghdad, Iraq
20:00 UTC+4	E.Mohammed 20'	Report	Karimi 30'; Daei 84'	Stadium: Al-Shaab Stadium; Attendance: 40,000; Referee: Felipe Ramos (Mexico)

14 September 2001 Friendly	Qatar	0–0	Iraq	Doha, Qatar
				Stadium: Grand Hamad Stadium

22 September 2001 2002 WCQ	Thailand	1–1	Iraq	Bangkok, Thailand
18:30 UTC+7	Suksomkit 38'	Report	E.Mohammed 63'	Stadium: Rajamangala Stadium; Attendance: 17,000; Referee: Sun Baojie (China)

28 September 2001 2002 WCQ	Iraq	1–0	Bahrain	Baghdad, Iraq
20:00 UTC+4	E.Mohammed 10'	Report		Stadium: Al-Shaab Stadium; Attendance: 15,000; Referee: Kim Young-Joo (South Korea)

5 October 2001 2002 WCQ	Iraq	1–2	Saudi Arabia	Amman, Jordan
18:00 UTC+3	Al-Hail 31'	Report	Shehan 1', 77'	Stadium: Amman International Stadium; Attendance: 17,000; Referee: Óscar Ruiz (Colombia)

12 October 2001 2002 WCQ	Iran	2–1	Iraq	Tehran, Iran
16:00 UTC+04:30	Mahdavikia 27'; Karimi 71'	Report	Chathir 52'	Stadium: Azadi Stadium; Attendance: 100,000; Referee: Kim Young-Joo (South Korea)

=== 2002 ===
11 January 2002 Friendly	Oman	0–2	Iraq	Doha, Qatar
			Ridha 4'; Hussein 90'	Stadium: Al-Wakrah Stadium

13 January 2002 Friendly	Qatar	1–3	Iraq	Doha, Qatar
			Tariq 60'; Mahmoud 65'; H.Mohammed 70'	Stadium: Al-Wakrah Stadium

19 July 2002 Friendly	Iraq	2–0	Syria	Baghdad, Iraq
	Farhan 68'; Hashim 90+1'			Stadium: Al-Shaab Stadium

22 July 2002 Friendly	Iraq	2–1	Syria	Baghdad, Iraq
	E.Mohammed 57'; Farhan 64'		Ahmed Azzam 77'	Stadium: Al-Shaab Stadium

1 September 2002 2002 WAFF	Palestine	0–2	Iraq	Damascus, Syria
			Wahaib 47'; Farhan 69'	Stadium: Al Abbassiyyine Stadium

3 September 2002 2002 WAFF	Iraq	1–0	Syria	Damascus, Syria
	Ahmad Kadhim 43'			Stadium: Al Abbassiyyine Stadium

5 September 2002 2002 WAFF	Iraq	0–0 (a.e.t.) (6–5 p)	Iran	Damascus, Syria
				Stadium: Al Abbassiyyine Stadium
	Penalties
	A. Abdul-Jabar (penalty scored); Abu Al-Hail (penalty scored); H. Abdul-Jabar (penalty scored); E.Mohammed (penalty scored); Kadhim (penalty missed); Akram (penalty scored); Abbas (penalty scored)		(penalty scored) Nekounam; (penalty scored) Bakhtiarizadeh; (penalty scored) Navidkia; (penalty scored) Nosrati; (penalty missed) Nikbakht; (penalty scored) Bayatinia; (penalty missed) Azizzadeh

7 September 2002 2002 WAFF	Iraq	3–2 (a.e.t.)	Jordan	Damascus, Syria
	Farhan 32'; Y.Mahmoud 89'; H.Mahmoud 103'		Shehdeh 2'; Deeb 30'	Stadium: Al Abbassiyyine Stadium

20 November 2002 Friendly	Qatar	2–1	Iraq	Doha, Qatar
	Hamid 79'; Rahmi 83' (o.g.)		Mnajed 39'	Stadium: Jassim Bin Hamad Stadium

23 November 2002 Friendly	Bahrain	2–2	Iraq	Doha, Qatar
	Issa 77'; Al-Dosari 56' (pen.)		A.Salah 62' (pen.); L.Salah 87'	Stadium: Jassim Bin Hamad Stadium

=== 2003 ===
13 August 2003 2003 LG Cup	Iran	0–1	Iraq	Tehran, Iran
			Swadi 52'	Stadium: Azadi Stadium

15 August 2003 2003 LG Cup	Uruguay	5–2	Iraq	Tehran, Iran
	Ligüera 31', 39', 81'; Bueno 66', 70'		Mohammed 58'; Wahaib 85' (pen.)	Stadium: Azadi Stadium

26 August 2003 Friendly	Jordan	2–1	Iraq	Amman, Jordan
			Hashim 69'	Stadium: King Abdullah Stadium

8 October 2003 2004 ACQ	Iraq	5–1	Bahrain	Kuala Lumpur, Malaysia
	Y.Mahmoud 5', 48', 69', 83'; Swadi 25'		Farhan 71'	Stadium: Bukit Jalil Stadium

10 October 2003 2004 ACQ	Malaysia	0–0	Iraq	Kuala Lumpur, Malaysia
				Stadium: Bukit Jalil Stadium

12 October 2003 2004 ACQ	Iraq	3–0	Myanmar	Kuala Lumpur, Malaysia
	Obeid 39'; Mnajed 50'; H.Mohammed 86'			Stadium: Bukit Jalil Stadium

20 October 2003 2004 ACQ	Iraq	5–1	Malaysia	Manama, Bahrain
	Hashim 20'; Y.Mahmoud 36', 45', 63'; Fawzi 70'		Hairuddin Omar 53'	Stadium: Bahrain National Stadium; Attendance: 500; Referee: Mohammed Omar Al-Saeedi (United Arab Emirates)

22 October 2003 2004 ACQ	Myanmar	1–3	Iraq	Manama, Bahrain
	Zaw Zaw 45'		Hassan 38'; Rahim 66'; Swadi 89' (pen.)	Stadium: Bahrain National Stadium; Attendance: 300; Referee: Farajollah Yasrebi (Iran)

24 October 2003 2004 ACQ	Bahrain	1–0	Iraq	Manama, Bahrain
	Hubail 12'			Stadium: Bahrain National Stadium; Attendance: 17,000; Referee: Mohammed Omar Al-Saeedi (United Arab Emirates)

12 December 2003 2003 Prime Minister's Cup	Bahrain	2–2	Iraq	Manama, Bahrain
			Mnajed 40'; H.Mohammed 76'	Stadium: National Stadium

15 December 2003 2003 Prime Minister's Cup	Iraq	2–0	Kenya	Manama, Bahrain
	H.Mohammed 9'; Hassan 43'			Stadium: National Stadium

18 December 2003 2003 Prime Minister's Cup	Egypt	2–0	Iraq	Manama, Bahrain
				Stadium: National Stadium

21 December 2003 Friendly	Qatar	0–0	Iraq	Doha, Qatar

=== 2004 ===
12 February 2004 Friendly	Japan	2–0	Iraq	Tokyo, Japan
				Stadium: National Stadium

18 February 2004 2006 WCQ	Uzbekistan	1–1	Iraq	Tashkent, Uzbekistan
			Salah 57'	Stadium: Pakhtakor Markaziy Stadium

31 March 2004 2006 WCQ	Palestine	1–1	Iraq	Doha, Qatar
			Farhan 20'	Stadium: Saoud bin Abdulrahman Stadium

23 May 2004 Friendly	Trinidad and Tobago	2–0	Iraq	West Bromwich, England
				Stadium: The Hawthorns

9 June 2004 2006 WCQ	Iraq	6–1	Chinese Taipei	Amman, Jordan
	Farhan 2', 14'; Fawzi 18'; Mnajed 50', 85'; Swadi 68'			Stadium: King Abdullah Stadium

19 June 2004 2004 WAFF	Iraq	2–1	Palestine	Tehran, Iran
	Emad Mohammed 41', 83'			Stadium: Azadi Stadium

21 June 2004 2004 WAFF	Jordan	2–0	Iraq	Tehran, Iran
				Stadium: Azadi Stadium

23 June 2004 2004 WAFF	Iran	2–1	Iraq	Tehran, Iran
			Ahmad Mnajed 30'	Stadium: Azadi Stadium

25 June 2004 2004 WAFF	Jordan	3–1	Iraq	Tehran, Iran
			Emad Mohammed 81'	Stadium: Azadi Stadium

18 July 2004 2004 AFC Asian Cup	Iraq	0–1	Uzbekistan	Chengdu, China
				Stadium: Chengdu Longquanyi Football Stadium

22 July 2004 2004 AFC Asian Cup	Turkmenistan	2–3	Iraq	Chengdu, China
			H.Mohammed 12'; Farhan 80'; Qusay Munir 88'	Stadium: Chengdu Longquanyi Football Stadium

26 July 2004 2004 AFC Asian Cup	Saudi Arabia	1–2	Iraq	Chengdu, China
			Nashat Akram 51'; Younis Mahmoud 86'	Stadium: Chengdu Longquanyi Football Stadium

30 July 2004 2004 AFC Asian Cup	China	3–0	Iraq	Beijing, China
				Stadium: Workers' Stadium

8 September 2004 2006 WCQ	Chinese Taipei	1–4	Iraq	Taipei, Taiwan
			Sadir 4', 43'; Attiya 75'; Mahmoud 86'	Stadium: Taipei Municipal Stadium

7 October 2004 Friendly	Oman	1–0	Iraq	Muscat, Oman
				Stadium: Sultan Qaboos Sports Complex

13 October 2004 2006 WCQ	Iraq	1–2	Uzbekistan	Amman, Jordan
	Munir 29'			Stadium: King Abdullah Stadium

16 November 2004 2006 WCQ	Iraq	4–1	Palestine	Doha, Qatar
	Munir 54', 58'; Mohammed 65'; Akram 70'			Stadium: Ahmed bin Ali Stadium

3 December 2004 Friendly	Iraq	3–1	Yemen	Dubai, United Arab Emirates
	Nashat Akram 20'; Salih Sadir 50'; Emad Mohammed 62'			Stadium: Al-Maktoum Stadium

10 December 2004 17th Arabian Gulf Cup	Iraq	1–3	Oman	Doha, Qatar
	Farhan 56'			Stadium: Jassim Bin Hamad Stadium

13 December 2004 17th Arabian Gulf Cup	Qatar	3–3	Iraq	Doha, Qatar
			Razzaq Farhan 16'; Akram 54'; Haidar Abdul-Amir 90+2'	Stadium: Jassim Bin Hamad Stadium

16 December 2004 17th Arabian Gulf Cup	United Arab Emirates	1–1	Iraq	Doha, Qatar
			Munir 90+2' (pen.)	Stadium: Ahmed bin Ali Stadium

=== 2005 ===
26 March 2005 Friendly	Australia	2–1	Iraq	Sydney, Australia
	Bresciano 23'; Elrich 73'		Mohammad Nasser 12'	Stadium: Telstra Stadium

8 June 2005 Friendly	Jordan	0–1	Iraq	Amman, Jordan
			Mahdi Karim 15'	Stadium: King Abdullah Stadium

7 August 2005 Friendly	Bahrain	2–2	Iraq	Manama, Bahrain
	Sayed Mohamed Adnan 27'; Hussein Ali Ahmed 86'		Younis Mahmoud 51'; Mohammad Nasser 73'	Stadium: National Stadium

13 August 2005 Friendly	Cyprus	2–1	Iraq	Limassol, Cyprus
	Yiasemis Yiasemakis 63', 79'		Mohammad Nasser 17'	Stadium: Tsirio Stadium

11 October 2005 Friendly	Qatar	0–0	Iraq	Doha, Qatar
				Stadium: Al Gharafa Stadium

26 November 2005 Friendly	Kuwait	0–0	Iraq	Kuwait City, Kuwait
				Stadium: Peace & Friendship Stadium

1 December 2005 2005 West Asian Games	Iraq	4–0	Palestine	Al Rayyan, Qatar
	Farhan 4'; H.Mohammed 56'; Salah 73'; Ahmed Salah 86'			Stadium: Ahmed bin Ali Stadium; Referee: Abdullah Al-Buloushi (Qatar)

5 December 2005 2005 West Asian Games	Saudi Arabia	1–5	Iraq	Al Rayyan, Qatar
	Naif Al-Qadi 53'		Abdul-Amir 8'; E. Mohammed 19'; Akram 30'; Mahmoud 51', 78'	Stadium: Ahmed bin Ali Stadium; Referee: Abdullah Al-Buloushi (Qatar)

8 December 2005 2005 West Asian Games	Iraq	2–0	Saudi Arabia	Doha, Qatar
	Salah 33'; Farhan 85'			Stadium: Suheim bin Hamad Stadium

10 December 2005 2005 West Asian Games	Iraq	2–2 (a.e.t.) (4–3 p)	Syria	Doha, Qatar
	Farhan 45'; Mahmoud 78'		Al Amenah 19'; Al Hussain 90+1'	Stadium: Suheim bin Hamad Stadium
	Penalties
	Munir (penalty missed); E. Mohammed (penalty scored); Abdul-Amir (penalty scored); Mahmoud (penalty scored); Sabri (penalty scored)		(penalty missed) Aodi; (penalty scored) Dakka; (penalty scored) Alaya; (penalty scored) Chaabo; (penalty missed) Istanbuli

=== 2006 ===
13 February 2006 Friendly	Oman	1–0	Iraq	Muscat, Oman
	Khalifa Ayel 77'			Stadium: Royal Oman Police Stadium

16 February 2006 Friendly	Thailand	4–3	Iraq	Bangkok, Thailand
	Prat Samakrat 2'; Ali Hussein Rehema 10' (o.g.); Nirut Khamsawat 12'; Apichet Puttan 57'		Emad Mohammed 8', 43', 89'	Stadium: Ayutthaya Stadium

22 February 2006 2007 ACQ	Singapore	2–0	Iraq	Kallang, Singapore
19:30 SST	Amri 24'; Alam Shah 83'			Stadium: Singapore National Stadium; Attendance: 10,221; Referee: Mark Shield (Australia)

1 March 2006 2007 ACQ	Iraq	2–1	China	Al Ain, United Arab Emirates
16:00	Mahdi Karim 16'; H.Mohammed 67'		Tao Wei 54'	Stadium: Khalifa bin Zayed Stadium; Attendance: 7,700; Referee: Mohamed Omar Al Saeedi (United Arab Emirates)

15 March 2006 Friendly	Saudi Arabia	2–2	Iraq	Jeddah, Saudi Arabia
	Nawaf Al-Temyat 18'; Sami Al-Jaber 59'		Mohammed Nasser 28'; Haidar Abdul-Amir 90+4'	Stadium: Prince Abdullah Al-Faisal Stadium; Attendance: 7,700; Referee: Mohamed Omar Al Saeedi (United Arab Emirates)

15 July 2006 Friendly	Syria	1–3	Iraq	Damascus, Syria
	Zyad Chaabo 73'		Emad Mohammed 34'; Younis Mahmoud 45', 82'	Stadium: Abbasiyyin Stadium

21 July 2006 Friendly	Jordan	2–1	Iraq	Amman, Jordan
	Muayad Salim 36'; Ra'fat Ali 40'		Younis Mahmoud 53'	Stadium: Amman International Stadium

25 July 2006 Friendly	Syria	1–2	Iraq	Damascus, Syria
	Maher Al Sayed 61'		Emad Mohammed 34'; Salih Sadir 60'	Stadium: Abbasiyyin Stadium

9 August 2006 Friendly	Jordan	0–1	Iraq	Amman, Jordan
			Younis Mahmoud 15'	Stadium: King Abdullah Stadium

17 August 2006 2007 ACQ	Palestine	0–3	Iraq	Amman, Jordan
20:00			Younis Mahmoud 59', 62'; Mohammad Nasser 90'	Stadium: King Abdullah Stadium; Attendance: 5,000; Referee: Muhsen Basma (Syria)

6 September 2006 2007 ACQ	Iraq	2–2	Palestine	Al Ain, United Arab Emirates
20:30	Salih Sadir 70'; H.Mohammed 75'		Amer 13'; Al Amour 78'	Stadium: Khalifa bin Zayed Stadium; Attendance: 1,000; Referee: Salem Mujghef (Jordan)

4 October 2006 Friendly	Iran	2–0	Iraq	Amman, Jordan
	Sheys Rezaei 25'; Mehdi Rajabzadeh 70'			Stadium: King Abdullah Stadium

11 October 2006 2007 ACQ	Iraq	4–2	Singapore	Al Ain, United Arab Emirates
21:30	Younis Mahmoud 35', 68'; Mahdi Karim 60'; H.Mohammed 90+3'		Goncalves 9'; Amri 62'	Stadium: Khalifa bin Zayed Stadium; Attendance: 3,000; Referee: Mamed Mamedov (Turkmenistan)

15 November 2006 2007 ACQ	China	1–1	Iraq	Changsha, China
21:30	Han Peng 40'		Ahmed Salah 65'	Stadium: Helong Stadium; Attendance: 0 Referee: Subkhiddin Mohd Salleh (Malaysia)

=== 2007 ===
18 January 2007 18th Arabian Gulf Cup	Qatar	0–1	Iraq	Abu Dhabi, United Arab Emirates
			H.Mohammed 39'	Stadium: Al Nahyan Stadium

21 January 2007 18th Arabian Gulf Cup	Bahrain	1–1	Iraq	Abu Dhabi, United Arab Emirates
	Al-Marzouqi 8'		H.Mohammed 11'	Stadium: Al Nahyan Stadium

24 January 2007 18th Arabian Gulf Cup	Saudi Arabia	1–0	Iraq	Abu Dhabi, United Arab Emirates
	Al-Qahtani 12' (pen.)			Stadium: Al Nahyan Stadium

8 June 2007 Friendly	Jordan	1–1	Iraq	Amman, Jordan
			Ahmad Mnajed 25'	Stadium: Amman International Stadium

12 June 2007 Friendly	Jordan	0–0	Iraq	Amman, Jordan
				Stadium: Amman International Stadium

16 June 2007 2007 WAFF	Iran	0–0	Iraq	Amman, Jordan
				Stadium: Amman International Stadium

18 June 2007 2007 WAFF	Iraq	1–0	Palestine	Amman, Jordan
	H.Mohammed 86'			Stadium: Amman International Stadium

22 June 2007 2007 WAFF	Syria	0–3	Iraq	Amman, Jordan
			Younis Mahmoud 10' (pen.); Ahmad Mnajed 42'; Salih Sadir 85'	Stadium: Amman International Stadium

24 June 2007 2007 WAFF	Iran	2–1	Iraq	Amman, Jordan
	Badamaki 9'; Beikzadeh 21'		Salih Sadir 86' (pen.)	Stadium: Amman International Stadium

29 June 2007 Friendly	South Korea	3–0	Iraq	Jeju, South Korea
				Stadium: Jeju World Cup Stadium

2 July 2007 Friendly	Iraq	0–2	Uzbekistan	Paju, South Korea
		Report	Aziz Ibragimov 3'; Ulugbek Bakaev 73'	Stadium: Paju Public Stadium; Attendance: 100

7 July 2007 2007 AFC Asian Cup	Thailand	1–1	Iraq	Bangkok, Thailand
19:35 UTC+7	Suksomkit 6' (pen.)	Report	Mahmoud 32'	Stadium: Rajamangala Stadium; Attendance: 30,000; Referee: Kwon Jong-Chul (South Korea)

13 July 2007 2007 AFC Asian Cup	Iraq	3–1	Australia	Bangkok, Thailand
17:20 UTC+7	Akram 22'; H.Mohammed 60'; Jassim 86'	Report	Viduka 47'	Stadium: Rajamangala Stadium; Attendance: 6,000; Referee: Jasim Karim (Bahrain)

16 July 2007 2007 AFC Asian Cup	Oman	0–0	Iraq	Bangkok, Thailand
19:35 UTC+7		Report		Stadium: Supachalasai Stadium; Attendance: 500; Referee: Eddy Maillet (Seychelles)

21 July 2007 2007 AFC Asian Cup	Iraq	2–0	Vietnam	Bangkok, Thailand
20:20 UTC+7	Mahmoud 2', 65'	Report		Stadium: Rajamangala Stadium; Attendance: 9,720; Referee: Yuichi Nishimura (Japan)

25 July 2007 2007 AFC Asian Cup	Iraq	0–0 (a.e.t.) (4–3 p)	South Korea	Kuala Lumpur, Malaysia
18:20 UTC+8		Report		Stadium: Bukit Jalil Stadium; Attendance: 12,500; Referee: Saad Kamil Al-Fadhli (Kuwait)
	Penalties
	H.Mohammed (penalty scored); Munir (penalty scored); Abdul-Amir (penalty scored); Mnajed (penalty scored)		(penalty scored) Lee Chun-soo; (penalty scored) Lee Dong-gook; (penalty scored) Cho Jae-jin; (penalty missed) Yeom Ki-hun; (penalty missed) Kim Jung-woo

29 July 2007 2007 AFC Asian Cup	Iraq	1–0	Saudi Arabia	Jakarta, Indonesia
19:35 UTC+7	Mahmoud 72'	Report		Stadium: Gelora Bung Karno Stadium; Attendance: 60,000; Referee: Mark Shield (Australia)

16 October 2007 Friendly	Qatar	3–2	Iraq	Doha, Qatar
			Ahmad Salah 20'; Emad Mohammed 80'	Stadium: Grand Hamad Stadium

22 October 2007 2010 WCQ	Pakistan	0–7	Iraq	Lahore, Pakistan
			Akram 19'; M. Karim 24', 49', 88', 90'; Ghulam 71'; Mohammed 83'	Stadium: Punjab Stadium

28 October 2007 2010 WCQ	Iraq	0–0	Pakistan	Damascus, Syria
				Stadium: Abbasiyyin Stadium

=== 2008 ===
24 January 2008 Friendly	Jordan	1–1	Iraq	Dubai, United Arab Emirates
	Shelbaieh 61'		Mnajed 19'	Stadium: Al-Rashid Stadium

31 January 2008 Friendly	United Arab Emirates	0–1	Iraq	Abu Dhabi, United Arab Emirates
			H.Mohammed 27'	Stadium: Zayed Sports City Stadium

6 February 2008 2010 WCQ	Iraq	1–1	China	Dubai, United Arab Emirates
16:30 UTC+4	H.Mohammed 51' (pen.)	Report	Zheng Zhi 75'	Stadium: Al-Rashid Stadium; Attendance: 11,000; Referee: Mohsen Torky (Iran)

21 March 2008 Friendly	Kuwait	0–0	Iraq	Kuwait City, Kuwait
				Stadium: Jaber Al-Ahmad International Stadium

26 March 2008 2010 WCQ	Qatar	2–0	Iraq	Doha, Qatar
18:30 UTC+3	Montezine 1', 62'	Report		Stadium: Jassim Bin Hamad Stadium; Attendance: 13,000; Referee: Yuichi Nishimura (Japan)

17 May 2008 Friendly	Syria	2–1	Iraq	Damascus, Syria
	Amenah 17'; Rafe 21'		Karim 67'	Stadium: Abbasiyyin Stadium

25 May 2008 Friendly	Thailand	2–1	Iraq	Bangkok, Thailand
	Winothai 53'; Dangda 58'		Akram 88'	Stadium: Rajamangala Stadium

1 June 2008 2010 WCQ	Australia	1–0	Iraq	Brisbane, Australia
17:00 UTC+10	Kewell 47'	Report		Stadium: Suncorp Stadium; Attendance: 48,678; Referee: Ravshan Irmatov (Uzbekistan)

7 June 2008 2010 WCQ	Iraq	1–0	Australia	Dubai, United Arab Emirates
20:00 UTC+4	Mohammed 28'	Report		Stadium: Al-Rashid Stadium; Attendance: 8,000; Referee: Kazuhiko Matsumura (Japan)

14 June 2008 2010 WCQ	China	1–2	Iraq	Tianjin, China
20:00 UTC+8	Haibin 33'	Report	Mohammed 41'; Akram 65'	Stadium: Tianjin Olympic Centre Stadium; Attendance: 39,000; Referee: Abdul Bashir (Singapore)

22 June 2008 2010 WCQ	Iraq	0–1	Qatar	Dubai, United Arab Emirates
20:00 UTC+4		Report	Bechir 77'	Stadium: Al-Rashid Stadium; Attendance: 10,000; Referee: Ali Al-Badwawi (United Arab Emirates)

27 December 2008 Friendly	United Arab Emirates	2–2	Iraq	Al Ain, United Arab Emirates
	Omar 50'; Khamis 82'		Shakroun 42'; Rehema 85'	Stadium: Tahnoun bin Mohammed Stadium

=== 2009 ===
4 January 2009 19th Arabian Gulf Cup	Bahrain	3–1	Iraq	Muscat, Oman
	Yaser 28'; Adnan 69' (pen.); Al-Dakeel 90+2'		Mahmoud 81' (pen.)	Stadium: Sultan Qaboos Sports Complex

7 January 2009 19th Arabian Gulf Cup	Iraq	0–4	Oman	Muscat, Oman
			Rabia 23', 65', 79'; Al-Hosni 50'	Stadium: Sultan Qaboos Sports Complex

10 January 2009 19th Arabian Gulf Cup	Iraq	1–1	Kuwait	Muscat, Oman
	Abdul-Zahra 66'		Khalaf 37'	Stadium: Sultan Qaboos Sports Complex

22 March 2009 Friendly	Saudi Arabia	0–0	Iraq	Riyadh, Saudi Arabia
				Stadium: King Fahd International Stadium

28 March 2009 Friendly	South Korea	2–1	Iraq	Suwon, South Korea
	Chi-Woo 54'; Keun-Ho 70' (pen.)		Jae-Won 52' (o.g.)	Stadium: Suwon World Cup Stadium

31 May 2009 Friendly	Qatar	1–0	Iraq	Doha, Qatar
				Stadium: Jassim Bin Hamad Stadium

9 June 2009 Friendly	Iraq	1–1	Poland	Cape Town, South Africa
	Karim 53'		Guerreiro 71'	Stadium: Green Point Stadium

14 June 2009 2009 FIFA Confederations Cup	South Africa	0–0	Iraq	Johannesburg, South Africa
16:00 SAST		Report		Stadium: Ellis Park Stadium; Attendance: 48,837; Referee: Jorge Larrionda (Uruguay)

17 June 2009 2009 FIFA Confederations Cup	Spain	1–0	Iraq	Bloemfontein, South Africa
16:00 SAST	Villa 55'	Report		Stadium: Free State Stadium; Attendance: 30,512; Referee: Matthew Breeze (Australia)

20 June 2009 2009 FIFA Confederations Cup	Iraq	0–0	New Zealand	Johannesburg, South Africa
20:30 SAST		Report		Stadium: Ellis Park Stadium; Attendance: 23,295; Referee: Howard Webb (England)

10 July 2009 Friendly	Iraq	3–0	Palestine	Erbil, Iraq
	Hawar 19'; Mahmoud 55'; Salah 90'			Stadium: Franso Hariri Stadium

13 July 2009 Friendly	Iraq	4–0	Palestine	Baghdad, Iraq
	Hawar 27'; Karrar 57'; Abdul-Zahra 72'; Emad 90'			Stadium: Al-Shaab Stadium

15 November 2009 2009 UAE International Cup	Iraq	1–0	Azerbaijan	Al Ain, United Arab Emirates
	Abbas 88'			Stadium: Tahnoun bin Mohammed Stadium

18 November 2009 2009 UAE International Cup	United Arab Emirates	0–1	Iraq	Al Ain, United Arab Emirates
			Karim 20'	Stadium: Tahnoun bin Mohammed Stadium

== Head-to-head records ==
Iraq national football team head-to-head records (2000–2009)
Opponent	Pld	W	D	L	GF	GA	GD	Pts	Confederation
Australia	4	2	0	2	5	4	+1	6	AFC
Azerbaijan	1	1	0	0	1	0	+1	3	UEFA
Bahrain	9	2	4	3	14	14	0	10	AFC
China	6	2	2	2	7	11	–4	8	AFC
Chinese Taipei	2	2	0	0	10	2	+8	6	AFC
Cyprus	1	0	0	1	1	2	–1	0	UEFA
Egypt	1	0	0	1	0	2	–2	0	CAF
Iran	9	1	2	6	5	11	–6	5	AFC
Japan	2	0	0	2	1	6	–5	0	AFC
Jordan	12	4	4	4	14	14	0	16	AFC
Kazakhstan	2	0	2	0	2	2	0	2	UEFA
Kenya	1	1	0	0	2	0	+2	3	CAF
Kuwait	3	0	3	0	1	1	0	3	AFC
Kyrgyzstan	1	1	0	0	4	0	+4	3	AFC
Lebanon	3	1	2	0	4	3	+1	5	AFC
Macau	2	2	0	0	13	0	+13	6	AFC
Malaysia	2	1	1	0	5	1	+4	4	AFC
Myanmar	2	2	0	0	6	1	+5	6	AFC
Nepal	2	2	0	0	13	3	+10	6	AFC
New Zealand	1	0	1	0	0	0	0	1	OFC
Oman	7	1	1	5	3	10	–7	4	AFC
Pakistan	2	1	1	0	7	0	+7	4	AFC
Palestine	10	8	2	0	26	5	+21	26	AFC
Poland	1	0	1	0	1	1	0	1	UEFA
Qatar	11	2	4	5	10	13	–3	10	AFC
Saudi Arabia	9	4	2	3	13	8	+5	14	AFC
Singapore	2	1	0	1	4	4	0	3	AFC
South Africa	1	0	1	0	0	0	0	1	CAF
South Korea	3	0	1	2	1	5	–4	1	AFC
Spain	1	0	0	1	0	1	–1	0	UEFA
Syria	9	6	2	1	16	7	+9	20	AFC
Thailand	6	2	2	2	12	8	+4	8	AFC
Trinidad and Tobago	1	0	0	1	0	2	–2	0	CONCACAF
Turkmenistan	1	1	0	0	3	2	+1	3	AFC
United Arab Emirates	5	2	3	0	7	5	+2	9	AFC
Uruguay	1	0	0	1	2	5	–3	0	CONMEBOL
Uzbekistan	5	1	1	3	4	6	–2	4	AFC
Vietnam	1	1	0	0	2	0	+2	3	AFC
Yemen	1	1	0	0	3	1	+2	3	AFC
Total	143	55	42	46	222	160	+62	207	

== See also ==
- Iraq national football team results
