= Iraq national football team results (2010–2019) =

This is a list of the Iraq national football team results from 2010 to 2019.

== Results ==
Win Draw Loss Fixtures

=== 2010s ===
2010

16 September 2010 Friendly	Jordan	4–1	Iraq	Amman, Jordan
	Abdul-Haleem 6'; Abdullah Deeb 19'; Al-Sheikh 68'; Amer Deeb 71'		Akram 58'	Stadium: King Abdullah Stadium

21 September 2010 Friendly	Iraq	3–2	Oman	Amman, Jordan
	Samal 49'; Akram 68'; Mnajed 81'			Stadium: King Abdullah Stadium

25 September 2010 2010 WAFF	Iraq	2–1	Yemen	Amman, Jordan
17:00 GMT	Samal 49'; Hawar 72'	Report	Al-Nono 10'	Stadium: King Abdullah Stadium; Attendance: 8,000

29 September 2010 2010 WAFF	Palestine	0–3	Iraq	Amman, Jordan
17:00 GMT			Karim 15', 76'; Akram 86' (pen.)	Stadium: King Abdullah Stadium

1 October 2010 2010 WAFF	Iran	2–1	Iraq	Amman, Jordan
13:00 GMT	Hosseini 58'; Gholami 84'		Karim 71'	Stadium: King Abdullah Stadium; Attendance: 12,000; Referee: Hajime Matsuo (Japan)

12 October 2010 Friendly	Qatar	1–2	Iraq	Doha, Qatar
	Magid Mohamed 32'		Mohammed 10', 65'	Stadium: Grand Hamad Stadium

11 November 2010 Friendly	Iraq	2–0	India	Sharjah, United Arab Emirates
	Mustafa Karim 17' (pen.); Mahdi Karim 66'			Stadium: Sharjah Stadium

17 November 2010 Friendly	Iraq	1–1	Kuwait	Abu Dhabi, United Arab Emirates
	Mahmoud 45'			Stadium: Sharjah Stadium

23 November 2010 20th Arabian Gulf Cup	Iraq	0–0	United Arab Emirates	Aden, Yemen
19:00				Stadium: May 22 Stadium; Referee: Abdelrahman Al Qathani (Saudi Arabia)

26 November 2010 20th Arabian Gulf Cup	Bahrain	2–3	Iraq	Aden, Yemen
19:00	Ayesh 44'; Abdullatif 90+6' (pen.)		Abdul-Zahra 24', 54'; Hawar 90' (pen.)	Stadium: May 22 Stadium; Referee: Khalaf Mohammad Allabany (Yemen)

29 November 2010 20th Arabian Gulf Cup	Oman	0–0	Iraq	Zinjibar, Yemen
19:00				Stadium: Al-Wihda Stadium; Referee: Yasser Younis (Egypt)

2 December 2010 20th Arabian Gulf Cup	Kuwait	2–2 (a.e.t.) (5–4 p)	Iraq	Aden, Yemen
16:00	Al-Mutawa 1'; Al-Enezi 58'		Hawar 6'; Abdul-Zahra 14'	Stadium: May 22 Stadium; Referee: Hamdy Raaban Shaaban (Egypt)

18 December 2010 Friendly	Iraq	0–1	Syria	Sulaymaniyah, Iraq
			T. Dyab 86'	Stadium: Sulaymaniyah Stadium; Attendance: 16,000; Referee: Mohsen Torky (Iran)

22 December 2010 Friendly	Syria	0–1	Iraq	Damascus, Syria
			Shakir 87'	Stadium: Abbasiyyin Stadium

28 December 2010 Friendly	Saudi Arabia	0–1	Iraq	Dammam, Saudi Arabia
			Mahmoud 24'	Stadium: Prince Mohamed bin Fahd Stadium

2011

2 January 2011 Friendly	Iraq	2–3	China PR	Doha, Qatar
	Mahmoud 19', 45+2'

11 January 2011 2011 Asian Cup	Iraq	1–2	Iran	Al Rayyan, Qatar
19:15	Mahmoud 13'	Report	Rezaei 42'; Mobali 84'	Stadium: Ahmed bin Ali Stadium; Attendance: 10,478; Referee: Ravshan Irmatov (Uzbekistan)

15 January 2011 2011 Asian Cup	United Arab Emirates	0–1	Iraq	Al Rayyan, Qatar
19:15		Report	W. Abbas 90+3' (o.g.)	Stadium: Ahmed bin Ali Stadium; Attendance: 7,233; Referee: Yuichi Nishimura (Japan)

19 January 2011 2011 Asian Cup	Iraq	1–0	North Korea	Al Rayyan, Qatar
19:15	Jassim 22'	Report		Stadium: Ahmed bin Ali Stadium; Attendance: 4,111; Referee: Subkhiddin Mohd Salleh (Malaysia)

22 January 2011 2011 Asian Cup	Australia	1–0 (a.e.t.)	Iraq	Doha, Qatar
16:25 UTC+3	Kewell 118'	Report		Stadium: Jassim Bin Hamad Stadium; Attendance: 7,889; Referee: Abdulrahman Abdou (Qatar)

26 March 2011 Friendly	North Korea	0–2	Iraq	Sharjah, United Arab Emirates
		Report	Abdul-Zahra 53', 71'	Stadium: Khalid Bin Mohammed Stadium

29 March 2011 Friendly	Kuwait	1–0	Iraq	Sharjah, United Arab Emirates
	Al-Musawi 2'			Stadium: Khalid Bin Mohammed Stadium

29 June 2011 Friendly	Iraq	1–2	Syria	Erbil, Iraq
	Abdul-Zahra 80'			Stadium: Franso Hariri Stadium

13 July 2011 2011 Fuchs International Tournament	Iraq	0–2	Kuwait	Amman, Jordan
			Al-Fadhli 66'; Al-Fadhel 84'	Stadium: Amman International Stadium

16 July 2011 2011 Fuchs International Tournament	Jordan	1–1 (5–4 p)	Iraq	Amman, Jordan
		Report	Karim 15'	Stadium: Amman International Stadium; Attendance: 12,321

23 July 2011 2014 WCQ	Iraq	2–0	Yemen	Erbil, Iraq
19:00 UTC+3	H. Mohammed 10'; Abdul-Zahra 64'	Report		Stadium: Franso Hariri Stadium; Attendance: 20,000; Referee: Valentin Kovalenko (Uzbekistan)

28 July 2011 2014 WCQ	Yemen	0–0	Iraq	Al Ain, United Arab Emirates
20:00 UTC+4		Report		Stadium: Sheikh Khalifa International Stadium; Attendance: 1,500; Referee: Muhsen Basma (Syria)

19 August 2011 Friendly	Qatar	0–1	Iraq	Doha, Qatar
			Shakir 35'	Stadium: Jassim Bin Hamad Stadium

2 September 2011 2014 WCQ	Iraq	0–2	Jordan	Erbil, Iraq
17:00 UTC+3		Report	Abdel-Fattah 43'; Abdallah Deeb 47'	Stadium: Franso Hariri Stadium; Attendance: 24,000; Referee: Nawaf Shukralla (Bahrain)

6 September 2011 2014 WCQ	Singapore	0–2	Iraq	Kallang, Singapore
19:30 UTC+8		Report	Abdul-Zahra 50'; Mahmoud 86'	Stadium: Jalan Besar Stadium; Attendance: 5,505; Referee: Minoru Tōjō (Japan)

11 October 2011 2014 WCQ	China PR	0–1	Iraq	Shenzhen, China
20:15 UTC+8		Report	Mahmoud 45'	Stadium: Shenzhen Bay Sports Center; Attendance: 25,021; Referee: Saeid Mozaffarizadeh (Iran)

6 November 2011 Friendly	Iraq	1–0	Lebanon	Doha, Qatar
	Mohammed 86'			Stadium: Grand Hamad Stadium

11 November 2011 2014 WCQ	Iraq	1–0	China PR	Doha, Qatar
17:15 UTC+3	Mahmoud 90+2'	Report		Stadium: Grand Hamad Stadium; Attendance: 5,000; Referee: Peter Green (Australia)

15 November 2011 2014 WCQ	Jordan	1–3	Iraq	Amman, Jordan
18:00 UTC+2	Abdel-Fattah 17'	Report	Akram 55', 81'; Munir 65'	Stadium: Amman International Stadium; Attendance: 13,000; Referee: Ali Al Badwawi (United Arab Emirates)

13 December 2011 2011 Arab Games	Bahrain	3–0	Iraq	Doha, Qatar
17:30	Hardan 41'; Abdul-Latif 63' (pen.), 70'	Report		Stadium: Jassim Bin Hamad Stadium; Referee: Khaled Abdulrahman (Sudan)

16 December 2011 2011 Arab Games	Qatar	0–0	Iraq	Doha, Qatar
19:30		Report		Stadium: Jassim Bin Hamad Stadium; Referee: Djamel Haimoudi (Algeria)

2012

22 January 2012 Friendly	Lebanon	1–0	Iraq	Saida, Lebanon

29 February 2012 2014 WCQ	Iraq	7–1	Singapore	Doha, Qatar
16:45 UTC+3	Jassim 4'; Mahmoud 11', 61', 90+3'; H.M Mohammed 21'; Akram 36'; Karim 47'	Report	Abdul 27'	Stadium: Grand Hamad Stadium; Attendance: 950; Referee: Abdullah Al Hilali (Oman)

17 April 2012 Friendly	Egypt	0–0	Iraq	Dubai, United Arab Emirates
				Stadium: Al-Shabab Stadium

23 May 2012 Friendly	Iraq	1–0	Sierra Leone	Istanbul, Turkey
	Akram 4'			Stadium: Atatürk Olympic Stadium

28 May 2012 Friendly	Iraq	1–1	Botswana	Istanbul, Turkey
	Jassim 5'		Tshireletso 90+1'	Stadium: Atatürk Olympic Stadium; Attendance: 150; Referee: Hüseyin Göçek (Turkey)

3 June 2012 2014 WCQ	Jordan	1–1	Iraq	Amman, Jordan
19:00 UTC+3	Hayel 43'	Report	Akram 14'	Stadium: Amman International Stadium; Attendance: 17,000; Referee: Valentin Kovalenko (Uzbekistan)

12 June 2012 2014 WCQ	Iraq	1–1	Oman	Doha, Qatar
17:45 UTC+3	Mahmoud 37' (pen.)	Report	Al Balushi 8'	Stadium: Grand Hamad Stadium; Attendance: 1,650; Referee: Abdulrahman Abdou (Qatar)

24 June 2012 2012 Arab Cup	Iraq	1–0	Lebanon	Jeddah, Saudi Arabia
18:15	Karim 89'			Stadium: Prince Abdullah al-Faisal Stadium; Attendance: 1,650; Referee: Rédouane Jiyed (Morocco)

27 June 2012 2012 Arab Cup	Iraq	2–1	Egypt	Jeddah, Saudi Arabia
21:00	Karim 49'; Abdul-Zahra 75'		Gomaa 45' (pen.)	Stadium: Prince Abdullah al-Faisal Stadium; Referee: Abdullah Al-Balooshi (Qatar)

30 June 2012 2012 Arab Cup	Sudan	1–1	Iraq	Jeddah, Saudi Arabia
19:45	Hamad 9'		Shakir 5'	Stadium: Prince Abdullah al-Faisal Stadium; Referee: Slim Jedidi (Tunisia)

3 July 2012 2012 Arab Cup	Morocco	2–1	Iraq	Jeddah, Saudi Arabia
21:30	El Gharib 23'; Salhi 28'		Karim 90+6' (pen.)	Stadium: Prince Abdullah al-Faisal Stadium; Referee: Djamel Haimoudi (Algeria)

5 July 2012 2012 Arab Cup	Saudi Arabia	0–1	Iraq	Jeddah, Saudi Arabia
21:00			Abdul-Zahra 16'	Stadium: Prince Abdullah al-Faisal Stadium; Referee: Khalid Abdurrahman Sudan

11 September 2012 2014 WCQ	Japan	1–0	Iraq	Saitama, Japan
19:34 UTC+9	Maeda 25'			Stadium: Saitama Stadium 2002; Attendance: 60,593; Referee: Abdul Malik Abdul Bashir (Singapore)

11 October 2012 Friendly	Brazil	6–0	Iraq	Malmö, Sweden
	Oscar 22', 27'; Kaká 48'; Hulk 48'; Neymar 75'; Lucas 79'			Stadium: Swedbank Stadion; Attendance: 14.147; Referee: Martin Hansson (Sweden)

16 October 2012 2014 WCQ	Iraq	1–2	Australia	Doha, Qatar
17:15 UTC+3	Abdul-Zahra 72'	Report	Cahill 80'; Thompson 84'	Stadium: Grand Hamad Stadium; Attendance: 2,183; Referee: Lee Min-Hu (Korea Republic)

7 November 2012 Friendly	Qatar	2–1	Iraq	Doha, Qatar
			Ibrahim 89'	Stadium: Grand Hamad Stadium

14 November 2012 2014 WCQ	Iraq	1–0	Jordan	Doha, Qatar
16:00 UTC+3	Ahmad 86'			Stadium: Grand Hamad Stadium; Attendance: 1,755; Referee: Tan Hai (China PR)

3 December 2012 Friendly	Bahrain	0–0	Iraq	Doha, Qatar
				Stadium: Qatar SC Stadium

10 December 2012 2012 WAFF	Iraq	1–0	Jordan	Al Farwaniyah, Kuwait
17:25	Ahmad 62'	Report		Stadium: Ali Al-Salem Al-Sabah Stadium; Attendance: 1,600; Referee: Ali Shaban (Kuwait)

13 December 2012 2012 WAFF	Iraq	1–1	Syria	Kuwait City, Kuwait
17:25	Al Masri 11' (o.g.)	Report	Al Douni 48'	Stadium: Al-Sadaqua Walsalam Stadium; Attendance: 1,300; Referee: Abdulla Hassan Mohamed (UAE)

18 December 2012 2012 WAFF	Oman	0–2	Iraq	Al Farwaniyah, Kuwait
17:30		Report	Radhi 6'; Yasin 39'	Stadium: Ali Al-Salem Al-Sabah Stadium; Attendance: 500; Referee: Abdulla Hassan Mohamed (UAE)

20 December 2012 2012 WAFF	Iraq	0–1	Syria	Kuwait City, Kuwait
18:45		Report	Al Salih 74'	Stadium: Al-Sadaqua Walsalam Stadium; Attendance: 5,000; Referee: Minoru Tojo (Japan)

30 December 2012 Friendly	Iraq	1–2	Tunisia	Abu Dhabi, United Arab Emirates
	Mahmoud 87'		Issam Jemâa 47'; Ben Youssef 58'	Stadium: Al Nahyan Stadium; Referee: Hamad Al-Sheikh Hashmi (UAE)

2013

6 January 2013 21st Arabian Gulf Cup	Saudi Arabia	0–2	Iraq	Isa Town, Bahrain
19:15		Report	Shaker 18'; Hawsawi 72' (o.g.)	Stadium: Khalifa Sports City Stadium; Attendance: 15,000; Referee: Viktor Kassai (Hungary)

9 January 2013 21st Arabian Gulf Cup	Iraq	1–0	Kuwait	Isa Town, Bahrain
16:15	Ahmad 29'	Report		Stadium: Khalifa Sports City Stadium; Attendance: 12,000; Referee: Nawaf Shukralla (Bahrain)

12 January 2013 21st Arabian Gulf Cup	Iraq	2–0	Yemen	Isa Town, Bahrain
17:45	Ismail 16'; Ahmad 36'	Report		Stadium: Khalifa Sports City Stadium; Attendance: 10,000; Referee: Abdullah Al-Hilali (Oman)

15 January 2013 21st Arabian Gulf Cup	Iraq	1–1 (a.e.t.) (4–2 p)	Bahrain	Riffa, Bahrain
18:45	Mahmoud 18'	Report	Baba 61'	Stadium: Bahrain National Stadium; Attendance: 35,000; Referee: Ravshan Irmatov (Uzbekistan)
	Penalties
	Yasin (penalty missed); Ismail (penalty scored); Salem (penalty scored); Mahmoud (penalty scored); Sabri (penalty scored)		(penalty missed) Husain; (penalty scored) Aaish; (penalty scored) Dhiya; (penalty missed) Al Malood

18 January 2013 21st Arabian Gulf Cup	United Arab Emirates	2–1 (a.e.t.)	Iraq	Riffa, Bahrain
19:00	Abdulrahman 28'; Al Hammadi 107'	Report	Mahmoud 81'	Stadium: Bahrain National Stadium; Attendance: 35,000; Referee: Khalil Al Ghamdi (Saudi Arabia)

1 February 2013 Friendly	Iraq	3–0	Malaysia	Ajman, United Arab Emirates
	Nadhim 14'; Abdul-Raheem 37', 67'

6 February 2013 2015 ACQ	Iraq	1–0	Indonesia	Dubai, United Arab Emirates
17:30 UTC+4	Younis Mahmoud 66'	Report		Stadium: Al-Rashid Stadium; Attendance: 3,600; Referee: Minoru Tōjō (Japan)

22 March 2013 2015 ACQ	China PR	1–0	Iraq	Changsha, China
19:35 UTC+8	Yu Dabao 90+3'	Report		Stadium: Helong Stadium; Attendance: 31,621; Referee: Ben Williams (Australia)

26 March 2013 Friendly	Iraq	2–1	Syria	Baghdad, Iraq
	Mahmoud 52'; Ali Rehema 90+5'		Khribin 80'	Stadium: Al-Shaab Stadium; Referee: Mohammed Arafah (Jordan)

27 May 2013 Friendly	Iraq	0–1	Liberia	Baghdad, Iraq
			Marcus Macauley 49'	Stadium: Al-Shaab Stadium

4 June 2013 2014 WCQ	Oman	1–0	Iraq	Muscat, Oman
17:00 UTC+4	Al Ajmi 45+4'	Report		Stadium: Sultan Qaboos Sports Complex; Attendance: 18,300; Referee: Kim Dong-Jin (Korea Republic)

11 June 2013 2014 WCQ	Iraq	0–1	Japan	Doha, Qatar
17:30 UTC+3		Report	Okazaki 89'	Stadium: Grand Hamad Stadium; Attendance: 1,100; Referee: Valentin Kovalenko (Uzbekistan)

18 June 2013 2014 WCQ	Australia	1–0	Iraq	Sydney, Australia
19:30 UTC+10	Kennedy 83'	Report		Stadium: Stadium Australia; Attendance: 80,523; Referee: Alireza Faghani (Iran)

14 August 2013 Friendly	Iraq	0–6	Chile	Copenhagen, Denmark
		Report	Mena 7'; Sánchez 20', 28'; Beausejour 36', 45'; Henríquez 79'	Stadium: Brøndby Stadium; Attendance: 7,000; Referee: Michael Johansen

6 October 2013 Friendly	Iraq	3–2	Yemen	Beirut, Lebanon
	Radhi 26'; Nadhim 54'; Mahmoud 73'		Hanash 42' (pen.); Al-Worafi 90'	Stadium: Camille Chamoun Stadium

8 October 2013 Friendly	Lebanon	1–1	Iraq	Beirut, Lebanon
	Hassan Chaito 58'		Saad Abdul-Amir 85'	Stadium: Camille Chamoun Stadium

15 October 2013 2015 ACQ	Iraq	0–2	Saudi Arabia	Amman, Jordan
19:30 UTC+3		Report	Hawsawi 34'; Al-Shamrani 78'	Stadium: Amman International Stadium; Attendance: 12,000; Referee: Abdullah Al Hilali (Oman)

11 November 2013 Friendly	Iraq	2–1	Syria	Zarqa, Jordan
	Ahmad 26'; Alaa Abdul-Zahra 80'		Khribin	Stadium: Prince Mohammed Stadium

15 November 2013 2015 ACQ	Saudi Arabia	2–1	Iraq	Dammam, Saudi Arabia
19:30 UTC+3	Al-Jassim 18'; Al-Shamrani 60'	Report	Younis Mahmoud 45+1'	Stadium: Prince Mohamed bin Fahd Stadium; Attendance: 21,600; Referee: Masaaki Toma (Japan)

19 November 2013 2015 ACQ	Indonesia	0–2	Iraq	Gelora Bung Karno Stadium
19:00 UTC+7		Report	Ahmad 27'; Karrar 32' (pen.)	Attendance: 300; Referee: Ravshan Irmatov (Uzbekistan)

28 December 2013 2013 WAFF	Bahrain	0–0	Iraq	Doha, Qatar
				Stadium: Abdullah bin Khalifa Stadium

31 December 2013 2013 WAFF	Iraq	0–0	Oman	Doha, Qatar
				Stadium: Abdullah bin Khalifa Stadium

2014

21 February 2014 Friendly	Iraq	2–0	North Korea	Dubai, United Arab Emirates
	Nadhim 10'; Abdul-Raheem 68'			Stadium: Zabeel Stadium

5 March 2014 2015 ACQ	Iraq	3–1	China PR	Sharjah, United Arab Emirates
18:00 UTC+4	Younis Mahmoud 23', 43'; Adnan 58'	Report	Zhang Xizhe 73' (pen.)	Stadium: Sharjah Stadium; Attendance: 5,000; Referee: Yuichi Nishimura (Japan)

4 September 2014 Friendly	Iraq	0–2	Peru	Dubai, United Arab Emirates
17:00 (UTC−3)			Nadhim 18' (o.g.); Zambrano 26'	Stadium: Maktoum Bin Rashid Al Maktoum Stadium; Attendance: 2,000; Referee: Hamad Al Shaikh Hashmi (United Arab Emirates)

10 October 2014 Friendly	Yemen	1–1	Iraq	Manama, Bahrain
	Ayman Al-Hagri 53'		Hussein Ali Wahid 58'	Stadium: Al-Ahli Stadium

14 October 2014 Friendly	Bahrain	0–0	Iraq	Manama, Bahrain
				Stadium: National Stadium

14 November 2014 22nd Arabian Gulf Cup	Iraq	0–1	Kuwait	Riyadh, Saudi Arabia
20:15		Report	Al Enezi 90+2'	Stadium: Prince Faisal bin Fahd Stadium; Attendance: 36,053; Referee: Damir Skomina (Slovenia)

17 November 2014 22nd Arabian Gulf Cup	Iraq	1–1	Oman	Riyadh, Saudi Arabia
20:15	Kasim 14'	Report	Mubarak 51' (pen.)	Stadium: Prince Faisal bin Fahd Stadium; Referee: Abdullah Balideh (Qatar)

20 November 2014 22nd Arabian Gulf Cup	United Arab Emirates	2–0	Iraq	Riyadh, Saudi Arabia
19:45	Mabkhout 50', 62'	Report		Stadium: King Fahd International Stadium; Referee: Fahad Al-Mirdasi (Saudi Arabia)

22 December 2014 Friendly	Iraq	1–1	Kuwait	Dubai, United Arab Emirates
	Mahmoud 85' (pen.)		Ali Maqseed 45' (pen.)	Stadium: Al-Rashid Stadium

25 December 2014 Friendly	Uzbekistan	1–0	Iraq	Dubai, United Arab Emirates
	Iskanderov 13' (pen.)	Report		Stadium: Al-Rashid Stadium

28 December 2014 Friendly	Uzbekistan	0–0	Iraq	Dubai, United Arab Emirates
		Report		Stadium: Al-Rashid Stadium

2015

4 January 2015 Friendly	Iraq	0–1	Iran	Wollongong, Australia
	Mahmoud (penalty missed) 63'		Azmoun 57'	Stadium: WIN Stadium

12 January 2015 2015 AFC Asian Cup	Jordan	0–1	Iraq	Brisbane, Australia
19:00 AEST (UTC+10)	Yaseen (yellow card) 54' (yellow-red card) 84'	Report	Kasim 77'	Stadium: Brisbane Stadium; Attendance: 6,840; Referee: Fahad Al-Mirdasi (Saudi Arabia)

16 January 2015 2015 AFC Asian Cup	Iraq	0–1	Japan	Brisbane, Australia
19:00 AEST (UTC+10)		Report	Honda 23' (pen.)	Stadium: Brisbane Stadium; Attendance: 22,941; Referee: Alireza Faghani (Iran)

20 January 2015 2015 AFC Asian Cup	Iraq	2–0	Palestine	Canberra, Australia
20:00 AEDT (UTC+11)	Mahmoud 48', (penalty missed) 60'; Yasin 88'	Report		Stadium: Canberra Stadium; Attendance: 10,235; Referee: Abdulla Hassan Mohamed (United Arab Emirates)

23 January 2015 2015 AFC Asian Cup	Iran	3–3 (a.e.t.) (6–7 p)	Iraq	Canberra, Australia
17:30 AEDT (UTC+11)	Azmoun 24'; Pooladi (yellow card) 22' (yellow-red card) 43'; Pouraliganji 103'; Ghoochannejhad 119'	Report	Yasin 56'; Mahmoud 93'; Ismail 116' (pen.)	Stadium: Canberra Stadium; Attendance: 18,921; Referee: Ben Williams (Australia)
	Penalties
	Hajsafi (penalty missed); Pouraliganji (penalty scored); Nekounam (penalty scored); Hosseini (penalty scored); Ghafouri (penalty scored); Jahanbakhsh (penalty scored); Teymourian (penalty scored); Amiri (penalty missed)		(penalty missed) Abdul-Amir; (penalty scored) Salem; (penalty scored) Ismail; (penalty scored) Adnan; (penalty scored) Mahmoud; (penalty scored) Kasim; (penalty scored) Hussein; (penalty scored) Shaker

26 January 2015 2015 AFC Asian Cup	South Korea	2–0	Iraq	Sydney, Australia
20:00 AEDT (UTC+11)	Jung-hyup 20'; Young-gwon 50'	Report		Stadium: Stadium Australia; Attendance: 36,053; Referee: Ryuji Sato (Japan)

30 January 2015 2015 Asian Cup	Iraq	2–3	United Arab Emirates	Newcastle, Australia
20:00 AEDT (UTC+11)	Salem 28'; Kalaf 42'; Ibrahim (red card) 55'	Report	Khalil 16', 51'; Mabkhout 57' (pen.)	Stadium: Newcastle Stadium; Attendance: 12,829; Referee: Nawaf Shukralla (Bahrain)

28 March 2015 Friendly	Iraq	2–1	DR Congo	Dubai, United Arab Emirates
	Ibrahim 5'; Tariq 72'		M'Poku 21' (pen.)	Stadium: The Sevens Stadium

31 March 2015 Friendly	Iraq	1–0	DR Congo	Dubai, United Arab Emirates
	Kasim 59'			Stadium: The Sevens Stadium

11 June 2015 Kirin Challenge Cup	Japan	4–0	Iraq	Yokohama, Japan
	Honda 5'; Makino 9'; Okazaki 33'; Haraguchi 84'			Stadium: Nissan Stadium

26 August 2015 Friendly	Lebanon	2–3	Iraq	Sidon, Lebanon
	Chaito (penalty missed) 47'; Atwi 58'; Jradi 62'		Abdul-Raheem 41'; Qasim 87'; Abdul-Zahra 90+5'	Stadium: Saida Municipal Stadium

3 September 2015 2018 WCQ/ACQ	Iraq	5–1	Chinese Taipei	Tehran, Iran
	Adnan 37'; Hosni 59'; Yasin 80'; Mahmoud 88'; Meram 90+1' (pen.)	Report (FIFA); Report (AFC)	Chih-hao 86'	Stadium: PAS Stadium; Referee: Yaqoob Abdul Baki (Oman)

8 September 2015 2018 WCQ/ACQ	Thailand	2–2	Iraq	Bangkok, Thailand
19:00 UTC+7	Theerathon 80' (pen.); Mongkol 83'	Report (FIFA); Report (AFC)	Meram 34'; Mahmoud 49'	Stadium: Rajamangala Stadium; Referee: Masaaki Toma (Japan)

3 October 2015 Friendly	Jordan	3–0	Iraq	Amman, Jordan
	Al-Dardour 52', 77'; H. Adnan 79' (o.g.)			Stadium: Amman International Stadium

8 October 2015 2018 WCQ/ACQ	Vietnam	1–1	Iraq	Hanoi, Vietnam
19:00 UTC+7	Công Vinh 25'	Report (FIFA); Report (AFC)	Mahmoud 90+5' (pen.)	Stadium: Mỹ Đình; Referee: Chris Beath (Australia)

17 November 2015 2018 WCQ/ACQ	Chinese Taipei	0–2	Iraq	Kaohsiung, Taiwan
19:00 UTC+8		Report (FIFA); Report (AFC)	Ismail 19'; Mahmoud 85'	Stadium: National Stadium; Attendance: 11,960; Referee: Jumpei Iida (Japan)

2016

18 March 2016 Friendly	Iraq	0–1	Syria	Tehran, Iran
			Osama Omari 30'	Stadium: PAS Stadium

24 March 2016 2018 WCQ/ACQ	Iraq	2–2	Thailand	Tehran, Iran
18:30 UTC+4:30	Kamel 66'; Adnan 90+5'	Report (FIFA); Report (AFC)	Mongkol 39'; Adisak 86'	Stadium: PAS Stadium; Attendance: 4,000; Referee: Abdulrahman Al-Jassim (Qatar

29 March 2016 2018 WCQ/ACQ	Iraq	1–0	Vietnam	Tehran, Iran
18:30 UTC+4:30	Abdul-Raheem 45+1'	Report (FIFA); Report (AFC)		Stadium: PAS Stadium; Attendance: 2,160; Referee: Peter Green (Australia)

24 July 2016 Friendly	Uzbekistan	2–1	Iraq	Tashkent, Uzbekistan
	Bikmaev 7'; Shomurodov 31'		Bayar Abubakir 90+2'	Stadium: Bunyodkor Stadium

8 August 2016 Friendly	Qatar	2–1	Iraq	Doha, Qatar
	Tabata 38'; Assadalla 50'		Mohammed 75'

16 August 2016 Friendly	North Korea	1–0	Iraq	Kuala Lumpur, Malaysia

21 August 2016 Friendly	North Korea	1–1	Iraq	Paroi, Malaysia
	Jong Il-gwan 21'		Abdul-Raheem 31'	Stadium: STAR Stadium

1 September 2016 2018 WCQ	Australia	2–0	Iraq	Perth, Australia
18:30 UTC+8	Luongo 58'; Juric 64'	Report (FIFA); Report (AFC)		Stadium: Perth Oval; Attendance: 18,923; Referee: Alireza Faghani (Iran)

6 September 2016 2018 WCQ	Iraq	1–2	Saudi Arabia	Shah Alam, Malaysia
19:00 UTC+8	Abdul-Raheem 18'	Report (FIFA); Report (AFC)	Al Abed 81' (pen.), 88' (pen.)	Stadium: Shah Alam Stadium; Attendance: 3,400; Referee: Khamis Al-Marri (Qatar)

6 October 2016 2018 WCQ	Japan	2–1	Iraq	Saitama, Japan
19:35 UTC+9	Haraguchi 26'; Yamaguchi 90+5'	Report (FIFA); Report (AFC)	Abdul-Amir 60'	Stadium: Saitama Stadium 2002; Attendance: 57,768; Referee: Kim Dong-jin (South Korea)

11 October 2016 2018 WCQ	Iraq	4–0	Thailand	Tehran, Iran
16:00 UTC+3:30	Abdul-Raheem 7', 25', 87', 90+4'	Report (FIFA); Report (AFC)		Stadium: PAS Stadium; Attendance: 2,255; Referee: Ma Ning (China)

6 November 2016 Friendly	Jordan	0–0	Iraq	Amman, Jordan
				Stadium: King Abdullah Stadium

15 November 2016 2018 WCQ	United Arab Emirates	2–0	Iraq	Abu Dhabi, United Arab Emirates
19:20 UTC+4	Khalil 26'; Matar 90+3'	Report (FIFA); Report (AFC)		Stadium: Mohammed Bin Zayed Stadium; Attendance: 14,583; Referee: Ilgiz Tantashev (Uzbekistan)

2017

18 March 2017 Friendly	Iran	0–1	Iraq	Tehran, Iran
			Abdul-Amir 72' (pen.)	Stadium: Azadi Stadium

23 March 2017 2018 WCQ	Iraq	1–1	Australia	Tehran, Iran
16:30 UTC+4:30	Yasin 76'	Report (FIFA); Report (AFC)	Leckie 39'	Stadium: PAS Stadium; Attendance: 3,270; Referee: Kim Jong-hyeok (South Korea)

28 March 2017 2018 WCQ	Saudi Arabia	1–0	Iraq	Jeddah, Saudi Arabia
20:30 UTC+3	Al-Shehri 53'	Report (FIFA); Report (AFC)		Stadium: King Abdullah Sports City; Attendance: 60,153; Referee: Valentin Kovalenko (Uzbekistan)

1 June 2017 Friendly	Iraq	1–0	Jordan	Basra, Iraq
	Abdul-Zahra 15'	Report		Stadium: Basra International Stadium; Attendance: 59,948

7 June 2017 Friendly	Iraq	0–0	South Korea	Ras Al Khaimah, United Arab Emirates
21:00 UTC+4		Report		Stadium: Emirates Club Stadium; Referee: Yaqoub Al-Hammadi (United Arab Emirates)

13 June 2017 2018 WCQ	Iraq	1–1	Japan	Tehran, Iran
16:55 UTC+4:30	Kamil 73'	Report (FIFA); Report (AFC)	Osako 8'	Stadium: Shahid Dastgerdi Stadium; Attendance: 983; Referee: Fu Ming (China)

26 August 2017 Friendly	Syria	1–1	Iraq	Kuala Lumpur, Malaysia
	Al-Khatib 15'		Fayyadh 70'	Stadium: Stadium Merdeka

31 August 2017 2018 WCQ	Thailand	1–2	Iraq	Bangkok, Thailand
19:00 UTC+7	Ibrahim 63' (o.g.)	Report (FIFA); Report (AFC)	Meram 34'; Abdul-Amir 84' (pen.)	Stadium: Rajamangala Stadium; Attendance: 22,604; Referee: Nawaf Shukralla (Bahrain)

5 September 2017 2018 WCQ	Iraq	1–0	United Arab Emirates	Amman, Jordan
17:00 UTC+3	Hussein 29'	Report (FIFA); Report (AFC)		Stadium: Amman International Stadium; Attendance: 2,185; Referee: Adham Makhadmeh (Jordan)

5 October 2017 Friendly	Iraq	2–1	Kenya	Basra, Iraq
19:00 (UTC+3)	Nouri 18' (pen.); A. Ibrahim 45'		Olunga 86'	Stadium: Basra International Stadium; Attendance: 28,341

13 November 2017 Friendly	Iraq	1–1	Syria	Karbala, Iraq
	Jenyat 41' (o.g.)		Al-Khatib 18'	Stadium: Karbala International Stadium

17 December 2017 Friendly	United Arab Emirates	1–0	Iraq	Dubai, United Arab Emirates
	Malallah 39'			Stadium: Zabeel Stadium

23 December 2017 23rd Arabian Gulf Cup	Bahrain	1–1	Iraq	Kuwait City, Kuwait
20:00 (UTC+3)	Rashid 79'	Report	Abdul-Raheem 89'	Stadium: Al Kuwait Sports Club Stadium; Referee: Ammar Al-Jeneibi (United Arab Emirates)

26 December 2017 23rd Arabian Gulf Cup	Iraq	2–1	Qatar	Kuwait City, Kuwait
20:00 (UTC+3)	Faez 45+1'; Husni 65'	Report	Almoez Ali 17'	Stadium: Al Kuwait Sports Club Stadium; Referee: Ali Mahmoud Shaban (Kuwait)

29 December 2017 23rd Arabian Gulf Cup	Iraq	3–0	Yemen	Kuwait City, Kuwait
18:30 (UTC+3)	Husni 54'; Faez 64' (pen.); Kamel 80'	Report		Stadium: Al Kuwait Sports Club Stadium; Referee: Ammar Al-Jeneibi (United Arab Emirates)

2018

2 January 2018 23rd Arabian Gulf Cup	Iraq	0–0 (a.e.t.) (2–4 p)	United Arab Emirates	Kuwait City, Kuwait
20:30 (UTC+3)		Report		Stadium: Jaber International Stadium; Referee: Aziz Asimov (Uzbekistan)
	Penalties
	Abdul-Zahra (penalty missed); Abdul-Amir (penalty scored); Tariq (penalty missed); Attwan (penalty scored)		(penalty scored) Mabkhout; (penalty scored) Abdulrahman; (penalty scored) Esmaeel; (penalty scored) Barqesh

28 February 2018 Friendly	Iraq	4–1	Saudi Arabia	Basra, Iraq
19:00 (UTC+3)	Al-Robeai 21' (o.g.); Mohsin 47'; M. Ali 51', 73'	Report	Fallatah 57'	Stadium: Basra International Stadium; Attendance: 59,684; Referee: Ammar Al-Jeneibi (United Arab Emirates)

21 March 2018 2018 IFC	Iraq	2–3	Qatar	Basra, Iraq
18:00 (UTC+3)	Ahmed Yasin 31'; Hussein Ali 67'	Report	Afif 17', 45+1'; Mohammad 63'	Stadium: Basra International Stadium; Attendance: 65,000; Referee: Taher Bakar (Syria)

27 March 2018 2018 IFC	Iraq	1–1	Syria	Basra, Iraq
18:00 (UTC+3)	M. Ali 57'		Al Khatib 76'	Stadium: Basra International Stadium; Attendance: 52,000; Referee: Muhammad Taqi Aljaafari Bin Jahari (Singapore)

8 May 2018 Al-Quds Cup	Iraq	0–0	Palestine	Basra, Iraq
19:00 (UTC+3)		Report		Stadium: Basra International Stadium; Referee: Murad Al Zawahreh (Jordan)

4 August 2018 Friendly	Palestine	0–3	Iraq	Al-Ram, Palestine
17:00 (UTC+3)		Report	Fanar 5'; Nadhim 34'; Shokan 89'	Stadium: Faisal Al-Husseini International Stadium; Referee: Murad Al Zawahreh (Jordan)

10 September 2018 Friendly	Kuwait	2–2	Iraq	Al Farwaniyah, Kuwait
18:30 (UTC+3)	Mhawi 46' (o.g.); Al Hajri 77'	Report	M. Ali 5'; Faez 65'	Stadium: Ali Sabah Al-Salem Stadium; Referee: Tihomir Pejin (Croatia)

11 October 2018 Superclásico Championship	Iraq	0–4	Argentina	Riyadh, Saudi Arabia
21:00 (UTC+3)		Report	Martínez 18'; Pereyra 53'; Pezzella 82'; Cervi 90+2'	Stadium: Prince Faisal bin Fahd Stadium; Referee: Jarred Gillett (Australia)

15 October 2018 Superclásico Championship	Saudi Arabia	1–1	Iraq	Riyadh, Saudi Arabia
21:00 (UTC+3)	Al-Bishi 90+4'	Report	M. Ali 71'	Stadium: King Saud University Stadium; Referee: Peter Green (Australia)

20 November 2018 Friendly	Iraq	0–0	Bolivia	Al Ain, United Arab Emirates
20:00 (UTC+4)		Report		Stadium: Sheikh Khalifa International Stadium; Referee: Yaqoub Al Hammadi (United Arab Emirates)

24 December 2018 Friendly	Iraq	2–1	China PR	Doha, Qatar
15:00 (UTC+3)	A. Ibrahim 22'; M. Ali 69'	Report	Wu Lei 43' (pen.)	Stadium: Suheim Bin Hamad Stadium; Referee: Ali Shaban (Kuwait)

28 December 2018 Friendly	Iraq	1–0	Palestine	Doha, Qatar
18:00 (UTC+3)	Tariq 47'	Report		Stadium: Suheim bin Hamad Stadium

2019

8 January 2019 2019 AFC Asian Cup	Iraq	3–2	Vietnam	Abu Dhabi, United Arab Emirates
17:30 (UTC+4)	M. Ali 35'; Tariq 60'; Adnan 90'	Report	Faez 24' (o.g.); Nguyễn Công Phượng 42'	Stadium: Zayed Sports City Stadium; Attendance: 4,779; Referee: Abdulrahman Al-Jassim (Qatar)

12 January 2019 2019 AFC Asian Cup	Yemen	0–3	Iraq	Sharjah, United Arab Emirates
17:30 (UTC+4)		Report	M. Ali 11'; Resan 19'; Abbas 90+1'	Stadium: Sharjah Stadium; Attendance: 9,757; Referee: Fu Ming (China PR)

16 January 2019 2019 AFC Asian Cup	Iran	0–0	Iraq	Dubai, United Arab Emirates
20:00 (UTC+4)		Report		Stadium: Al Maktoum Stadium; Attendance: 15,038; Referee: Ravshan Irmatov (Uzbekistan)

22 January 2019 2019 AFC Asian Cup	Qatar	1–0	Iraq	Abu Dhabi, United Arab Emirates
20:00 (UTC+4)	Al-Rawi 62'	Report		Stadium: Al Nahyan Stadium; Attendance: 14,701; Referee: Muhammad Taqi (Singapore)

20 March 2019 2019 IFC	Iraq	1–0	Syria	Basra, Iraq
18:00 (UTC+3)	Meram 75'	Report		Stadium: Basra International Stadium

26 March 2019 2019 IFC	Iraq	3–2	Jordan	Basra, Iraq
18:00 (UTC+3)	Hussein 38'; Resan 52'; M. Ali 70'	Report	Sulaka 7' (o.g.); Faisal 87'	Stadium: Basra International Stadium

7 June 2019 Friendly	Tunisia	2–0	Iraq	Radès, Tunisia
21:15 (UTC+3)	Khazri 4'; Srarfi 29'	Report		Stadium: Stade Olympique de Radès; Attendance: 12,500; Referee: Mohamed Maarouf Eid Mansour (Egypt)

30 July 2019 2019 WAFF	Iraq	1–0	Lebanon	Karbala, Iraq
19:30 (UTC+3)	Ali 58'	Report		Stadium: Karbala International Stadium; Referee: Ali Abdulnabi (Bahrain)

2 August 2019 2019 WAFF	Palestine	1–2	Iraq	Karbala, Iraq
19:30 (UTC+3)	Batran 3' (pen.)	Report	Abdul-Raheem 22'; Ali 83' (pen.)	Stadium: Karbala International Stadium; Referee: Turki Al-Khudhayr (Saudi Arabia)

8 August 2019 2019 WAFF	Syria	0–0	Iraq	Karbala, Iraq
22:30 (UTC+3)		Report		Stadium: Karbala International Stadium; Referee: Mohammad Arafah (Jordan)

11 August 2019 2019 WAFF	Iraq	2–1	Yemen	Karbala, Iraq
22:30 (UTC+3)	Bayesh 26'; Ali 31' (pen.)	Report	Al-Matari 90'	Stadium: Karbala International Stadium; Referee: Ali Al-Samaheeji (Bahrain)

14 August 2019 2019 WAFF	Iraq	0–1	Bahrain	Karbala, Iraq
20:30 (UTC+3)		Report	Moosa 40'	Stadium: Karbala International Stadium; Attendance: 34,500; Referee: Turki Al-Khudhayr (Saudi Arabia)

5 September 2019 2022 WCQ/ACQ	Bahrain	1–1	Iraq	Riffa, Bahrain
19:30 (UTC+3)	Al Aswad 9'	Report (FIFA); Report (AFC)	M. Ali 86'	Stadium: Bahrain National Stadium; Referee: Omar Al-Yaqoubi (Oman)

9 September 2019 Friendly	Uzbekistan	0–0	Iraq	Amman, Jordan
19:00 (UTC+3)		Report		Stadium: King Abdullah II Stadium

10 October 2019 2022 WCQ/ACQ	Iraq	2–0	Hong Kong	Basra, Iraq
19:30 (UTC+3)	M. Ali 37'; Adnan 79' (pen.)	Report (FIFA); Report (AFC)		Stadium: Basra International Stadium; Referee: Ammar Al-Jeneibi (United Arab Emirates)

15 October 2019 2022 WCQ/ACQ	Cambodia	0–4	Iraq	Phnom Penh, Cambodia
18:30 (UTC+7)		Report (FIFA); Report (AFC)	Bayesh 22'; Ali 41'; Attwan 57'; Ibrahim 62'	Stadium: Olympic Stadium; Attendance: 48,258; Referee: Clifford Daypuyat (Philippines)

14 November 2019 2022 WCQ/ACQ	Iraq	2–1	Iran	Amman, Jordan
16:00 (UTC+2)	M. Ali 11'; Abbas 90+2'	Report (FIFA); Report (AFC)	Nourollahi 25'	Stadium: Amman International Stadium; Attendance: 13,752; Referee: Hettikamkanamge Perera (Sri Lanka)

19 November 2019 2022 WCQ/ACQ	Iraq	0–0	Bahrain	Amman, Jordan
16:00 (UTC+2)		Report (FIFA); Report (AFC)		Stadium: Amman International Stadium; Attendance: 10,366; Referee: Muhammad Taqi (Singapore)

26 November 2019 24th Arabian Gulf Cup	Qatar	1–2	Iraq	Doha, Qatar
19:30 (UTC+3)	Hatem 49'	Report	Qasim 19', 27'	Stadium: Khalifa International Stadium; Attendance: 37,890; Referee: Lionel Tschudi (Switzerland)

29 November 2019 24th Arabian Gulf Cup	United Arab Emirates	0–2	Iraq	Doha, Qatar
17:30 (UTC+3)		Report	Abbas 6'; Abdul-Zahra 37'	Stadium: Khalifa International Stadium; Attendance: 17,437; Referee: Alexandre Boucaut (Belgium)

2 December 2019 24th Arabian Gulf Cup	Yemen	0–0	Iraq	Doha, Qatar
17:30 (UTC+3)		Report		Stadium: Abdullah bin Khalifa Stadium; Referee: Ahmad Al-Ali (Kuwait)

5 December 2019 24th Arabian Gulf Cup	Iraq	2–2 (a.e.t.) (3–5 p)	Bahrain	Doha, Qatar
17:00 (UTC+3)	M. Ali 6'; Bayesh 18'	Report	Al-Haza'a 14'; Marhoon 45+2'	Stadium: Jassim bin Hamad Stadium; Referee: Ryuji Sato (Japan)
	Penalties
	Faez (penalty scored); Ismail (penalty scored); Bayesh (penalty scored); Qasim (penalty missed)		(penalty scored) Al-Hardan; (penalty scored) Al-Shaikh; (penalty scored) Marhoon; (penalty scored) Thiago Augusto; (penalty scored) Madan

== Head-to-head records ==
Iraq national football team head-to-head records (2010–2019)
Opponent	Pld	W	D	L	GF	GA	GD	Pts	Confederation
Argentina	1	0	0	1	0	4	–4	0	CONMEBOL
Australia	5	0	1	4	2	7	–5	1	AFC
Bahrain	11	1	8	2	8	11	–3	11	AFC
Bolivia	1	0	1	0	0	0	0	1	CONMEBOL
Botswana	1	0	1	0	1	1	0	1	CAF
Brazil	1	0	0	1	0	6	–6	0	CONMEBOL
Cambodia	1	1	0	0	4	0	+4	3	AFC
Chile	1	0	0	1	0	6	–6	0	CONMEBOL
China	6	4	0	2	9	6	+3	12	AFC
Chinese Taipei	2	2	0	0	7	1	+6	6	AFC
DR Congo	2	2	0	0	3	1	+2	6	CAF
Egypt	1	0	1	0	0	0	0	1	CAF
Hong Kong	1	1	0	0	2	0	+2	3	AFC
India	1	1	0	0	2	0	+2	3	AFC
Indonesia	2	2	0	0	3	0	+3	6	AFC
Iran	7	2	2	3	8	9	–1	8	AFC
Japan	6	0	1	5	2	10	–8	1	AFC
Jordan	12	6	3	3	13	14	–1	21	AFC
Kenya	1	1	0	0	2	1	+1	3	CAF
Kuwait	8	1	4	3	7	10	–3	7	AFC
Lebanon	6	4	1	1	7	4	+3	13	AFC
Liberia	1	0	0	1	0	1	–1	0	CAF
Malaysia	1	1	0	0	3	0	+3	3	AFC
Morocco	1	0	0	1	1	2	–1	0	CAF
North Korea	5	3	1	1	6	2	+4	10	AFC
Oman	7	2	4	1	7	5	+2	10	AFC
Palestine	6	5	1	0	11	1	+10	16	AFC
Peru	1	0	0	1	0	2	–2	0	CONMEBOL
Qatar	9	4	1	4	11	11	0	13	AFC
Saudi Arabia	9	4	1	4	11	9	+2	13	AFC
Sierra Leone	1	1	0	0	1	0	+1	3	CAF
Singapore	2	2	0	0	9	1	+8	6	AFC
South Korea	2	0	1	1	0	2	–2	1	AFC
Sudan	1	0	1	0	1	1	0	1	CAF
Syria	13	4	5	4	11	11	0	17	AFC
Thailand	4	2	2	0	10	5	+5	8	AFC
Tunisia	2	0	0	2	1	4	–3	0	CAF
United Arab Emirates	10	3	2	5	7	10	–3	11	AFC
Uzbekistan	4	0	2	2	1	3	–2	2	AFC
Vietnam	3	2	1	0	5	3	+2	7	AFC
Yemen	10	7	3	0	18	5	+13	24	AFC
Total	169	68	48	53	194	169	+25	252	

== See also ==
- Iraq national football team results
