= Sergei Olshansky =

Soviet footballer

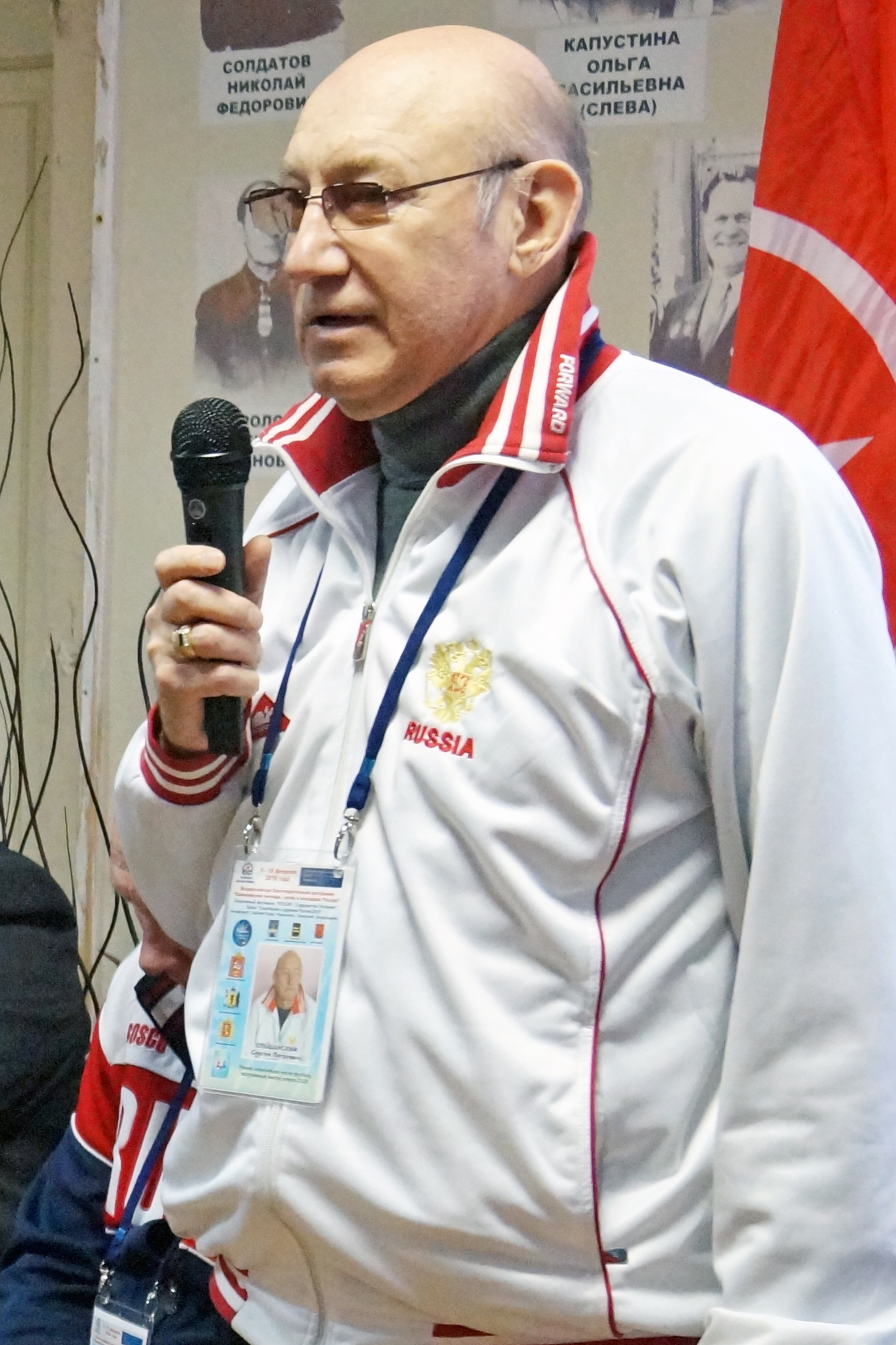

Personal information
- Full name: Sergei Petrovich Olshansky
- Date of birth: 28 May 1948 (age 78)
- Place of birth: Moscow, Russian SFSR, Soviet Union
- Height: 1.79 m (5 ft 10 in)
- Position: Defender

Team information
- Current team: FC Nika Moscow (general director)

Youth career
- MELZ Plant Moscow
- FShM Moscow

Senior career*
Years	Team	Apps	(Gls)
1966–1968	Burevestnik Moscow		
1969–1975	FC Spartak Moscow	138	(7)
1975	FC SKA Khabarovsk		
1976–1979	PFC CSKA Moscow	96	(1)

International career
1972–1977	USSR	19	(0)

Managerial career
- 1983–1984: PFC CSKA Moscow (assistant)
- 2003: FC Reutov (assistant)
- 2004: FC Saturn Yegoryevsk (assistant)
- 2005–: FC Nika Moscow (general director)
- * Club domestic league appearances and goals

Olympic medal record

Representing Soviet Union

Men's Football
Bronze medal – third place	1972 Munich	Team competition

Sergei Petrovich Olshansky (Russian: Серге́й Петрович Ольшанский; born May 28, 1948, in Moscow) is a retired Soviet football player.

Currently, he works as a general director for FC Nika Moscow.

== Honours ==
- Soviet Top League winner: 1969
- Soviet Cup winner: 1971
- Olympic bronze: 1972

== International career ==
Olshansky made his debut for USSR on August 6, 1972, in a friendly against Sweden. He played in the qualifiers for 1974 FIFA World Cup, UEFA Euro 1976 and 1978 FIFA World Cup (USSR did not qualify for the final tournaments for any of those).
