= Ammo Yousif =

Iraqi footballer (born 1945)

Personal information
- Full name: Emmanuel Yousif
- Date of birth: 1 July 1945 (age 81)
- Place of birth: Iraq
- Position: Forward

Senior career*
Years	Team	Apps	(Gls)
- Al-Firqa Al-Thalitha
- Al-Quwa Al-Jawiya
- Racing Club Beirut
- Al-Quwa Al-Jawiya

International career
1968–1975	Iraq	?	(2)
- * Club domestic league appearances and goals

Emmanuel Yousif better known as Ammo Yousif (born 1 July 1945) is an Iraqi former footballer who played as a forward for Iraq in the 1972 AFC Asian Cup. He played for the national team between 1968 and 1975.

He scored the only goal for Iraq at the 1972 AFC Asian Cup against Thailand and against Pakistan at the 1969 Friendship Cup.

== Career statistics ==
Scores and results list Iraq's goal tally first.

No	Date	Venue	Opponent	Score	Result	Competition
1.	11 May 1972	National Stadium, Bangkok	Thailand	1–0	1–1	1972 AFC Asian Cup
