= Iraq national football team results (2020–present) =

This article provides details of international football games played by the Iraq national football team from 2020 to present.

== Results ==
Key
Win
Draw
Defeat

=== 2020 ===
12 November 2020 Friendly	Iraq	0–0	Jordan	Dubai, United Arab Emirates
19:00 UTC+4		Report		Stadium: The Sevens Stadium; Referee: Adel Ali Al Naqbi (United Arab Emirates)

17 November 2020 Friendly	Iraq	2–1	Uzbekistan	Dubai, United Arab Emirates
18:00 UTC+4	Ali 64'; Adnan 85' (pen.)	Report	Khamdamov 39' (pen.)	Stadium: The Sevens Stadium; Referee: Adel Ali Al Naqbi (United Arab Emirates)

=== 2021 ===
12 January 2021 Friendly	United Arab Emirates	0–0	Iraq	Dubai, United Arab Emirates
19:30 UTC+4		Report		Stadium: Zabeel Stadium; Referee: Ahmed Al-Kaf (Oman)

27 January 2021 Friendly	Iraq	2–1	Kuwait	Basra, Iraq
18:00 UTC+3	Dawood 79'; Hussein 89' (pen.)	Report	Al Rashidi 22'	Stadium: Basra International Stadium; Referee: Salman Ahmad Falahi (Qatar)

29 March 2021 Friendly	Uzbekistan	0–1	Iraq	Tashkent, Uzbekistan
18:00 UTC+5		Report	Karim 56'	Stadium: Milliy Stadium; Referee: Nurzat Askat Uulu (Kyrgyzstan)

24 May 2021 Friendly	Iraq	0–0	Tajikistan	Basra, Iraq
19:30 UTC+3		Report		Stadium: Al Fayhaa Stadium; Referee: Ismaeel Habib (Bahrain)

29 May 2021 Friendly	Iraq	6–2	Nepal	Basra, Iraq
19:30 UTC+3	A. Abdul-Zahra 7'; M. Abdul-Zahra 39'; Hussein 40', 45+1'; Ali 67'; Jassim 75'	Report	Bista 8'; Dangi 29'	Stadium: Al-Fayhaa Stadium; Referee: Saed Khalefah (Kuwait)

7 June 2021 2022 WCQ/ACQ	Iraq	4–1	Cambodia	Arad, Bahrain
17:30 UTC+3	Ali 1'; Resan 23'; Adnan 27' (pen.); Hadi 90+3'	Report	Visal 55'	Stadium: Al Muharraq Stadium; Attendance: 0 Referee: Yaqoob Abdul Baki (Oman)

11 June 2021 2022 WCQ/ACQ	Hong Kong	0–1	Iraq	Arad, Bahrain
19:30 UTC+3		Report	Fung 11' (o.g.)	Stadium: Al Muharraq Stadium; Attendance: 0 Referee: Hiroyuki Kimura (Japan)

15 June 2021 2022 WCQ/ACQ	Iran	1–0	Iraq	Isa Town, Bahrain
19:30 UTC+3	Azmoun 35'	Report		Stadium: Khalifa Sports City Stadium; Attendance: 0 Referee: Ilgiz Tantashev (Uzbekistan)

2 September 2021 2022 WCQ	South Korea	0–0	Iraq	Seoul, South Korea
20:00 UTC+9		Report		Stadium: Seoul World Cup Stadium; Attendance: 0 Referee: Nawaf Shukralla (Bahrain)

7 September 2021 2022 WCQ	Iraq	0–3	Iran	Doha, Qatar
21:00 UTC+3		Report	Jahanbakhsh 3'; Taremi 69'; Gholizadeh 90'	Stadium: Khalifa International Stadium; Attendance: 0 Referee: Ma Ning (China PR)

7 October 2021 2022 WCQ	Iraq	0–0	Lebanon	Doha, Qatar
17:30 UTC+3		Report		Stadium: Khalifa International Stadium; Attendance: 0 Referee: Turki Al-Khudhayr (Saudi Arabia)

12 October 2021 2022 WCQ	United Arab Emirates	2–2	Iraq	Dubai, United Arab Emirates
20:45 UTC+4	Caio 33'; Mabkhout 90+4'	Report	Al-Attas 74' (o.g.); Hussein 89'	Stadium: Zabeel Stadium; Attendance: 2,820; Referee: Ryuji Sato (Japan)

11 November 2021 2022 WCQ	Iraq	1–1	Syria	Doha, Qatar
20:00 UTC+3	Al-Ammari 86' (pen.)	Report	Al Somah 79'	Stadium: Thani bin Jassim Stadium; Attendance: 50; Referee: Nawaf Shukralla (Bahrain)

16 November 2021 2022 WCQ	Iraq	0–3	South Korea	Doha, Qatar
18:00 UTC+3		Report	Lee Jae-sung 33'; Son Heung-min 74' (pen.); Jeong Woo-yeong 80'	Stadium: Thani bin Jassim Stadium; Referee: Ilgiz Tantashev (Uzbekistan)

30 November 2021 2021 FIFA Arab Cup	Iraq	1–1	Oman	Al Wakrah, Qatar
16:00 UTC+3	Abdulkareem 90+8' (pen.)	Report	Al-Yahyaei 78' (pen.)	Stadium: Al Janoub Stadium; Referee: Said Martínez (Honduras)

3 December 2021 2021 FIFA Arab Cup	Bahrain	0–0	Iraq	Doha, Qatar
13:00 UTC+3		Report		Stadium: Al Thumama Stadium; Referee: Janny Sikazwe (Zambia)

6 December 2021 2021 FIFA Arab Cup	Qatar	3–0	Iraq	Al Khor, Qatar
22:00 UTC+3	Ali 82'; Afif 84'; Al-Haydos 90+4'	Report		Stadium: Al Bayt Stadium; Referee: Bakary Gassama (Gambia)

=== 2022 ===
21 January 2022 Friendly	Iraq	1–0	Uganda	Baghdad, Iraq
18:00 UTC+3	Abbas 17'			Stadium: Al-Madina Stadium

27 January 2022 2022 WCQ	Iran	1–0	Iraq	Tehran, Iran
18:00 UTC+3:30	Taremi 48'	Report		Stadium: Azadi Stadium; Attendance: 9,354; Referee: Chris Beath (Australia)

1 February 2022 2022 WCQ	Lebanon	1–1	Iraq	Sidon, Lebanon
14:00 UTC+2	Sabra 45+2'	Report	Hussein 39'	Stadium: Saida Municipal Stadium; Attendance: 6,341; Referee: Adham Makhadmeh (Jordan)

18 March 2022 Friendly	Iraq	3–1	Zambia	Baghdad, Iraq
20:00 UTC+3	Ismail 10' (pen.); Ibrahim 23'; Hussein 78'	Report	Natiq 29' (o.g.)	Stadium: Al-Madina Stadium; Attendance: 25,237; Referee: Yousif Saeed Hasan (Iraq)

24 March 2022 2022 WCQ	Iraq	1–0	United Arab Emirates	Riyadh, Saudi Arabia
20:00 UTC+3	H. Ali 53'	Report		Stadium: King Fahd Stadium; Referee: Ma Ning (China PR)

29 March 2022 2022 WCQ	Syria	1–1	Iraq	Dubai, United Arab Emirates
17:45 UTC+4	Al Dali 3'	Report	Hussein 31'	Stadium: Rashid Stadium; Referee: Ryuji Sato (Japan)

23 September 2022 Friendly	Iraq	1–1 (3–4 p)	Oman	Amman, Jordan
18:00 UTC+3	Hussein 85'	Report	Al-Malki 82'	Stadium: King Abdullah II Stadium; Referee: Mohamad Issa (Lebanon)
	Penalties
	Hussein (penalty missed); Attwan (penalty scored); Ahmed (penalty scored); Rostam (penalty missed); Adnan (penalty scored); Karim (penalty missed)		(penalty missed) Al-Yahyaei; (penalty missed) Al-Malki; (penalty scored) Al-Sabhi; (penalty scored) Saleh; (penalty scored) Al-Musalami; (penalty scored) Al-Yahmadi

26 September 2022 Friendly	Iraq	1–0	Syria	Amman, Jordan
19:00 UTC+3	Hussein 27'	Report		Stadium: King Abdullah II Stadium; Referee: Ahmed Al Ali (Jordan)

9 November 2022 Friendly	Mexico	4–0	Iraq	Girona, Spain
21:00 UTC+1	Vega 4'; Funes Mori 48'; Gallardo 67'; Antuna 90+2' (pen.)	Report		Stadium: Estadi Montilivi; Referee: Guillermo Cuadra Fernández (Spain)

12 November 2022 Friendly	Ecuador	0–0	Iraq	Madrid, Spain
18:30 UTC+1		Report		Stadium: Cívitas Metropolitano; Referee: Gustavo Correia (Portugal)

30 December 2022 Friendly	Iraq	1–0	Kuwait	Basra, Iraq
15:00 UTC+3	Faez 9'	Report		Stadium: Al-Minaa Olympic Stadium; Attendance: 21,452; Referee: Zaid Thamer (Iraq)

=== 2023 ===
6 January 2023 25th Arabian Gulf Cup	Iraq	0–0	Oman	Basra, Iraq
19:00 UTC+3		Report		Stadium: Basra International Stadium; Attendance: 72,865; Referee: István Kovács (Romania)

9 January 2023 25th Arabian Gulf Cup	Saudi Arabia	0–2	Iraq	Basra, Iraq
19:15 UTC+3		Report	Bayesh 30'; Rostam 86'	Stadium: Basra International Stadium; Attendance: 65,155; Referee: Adnan Al-Naqbi (United Arab Emirates)

12 January 2023 25th Arabian Gulf Cup	Iraq	5–0	Yemen	Basra, Iraq
18:00 UTC+3	Nadhim 40'; Attwan 64'; Hussein 74' (pen.) 75'; H. Ali 88'	Report		Stadium: Basra International Stadium; Referee: Ilgiz Tantanev (Uzbekistan)

16 January 2023 25th Arabian Gulf Cup	Iraq	2–1	Qatar	Basra, Iraq
16:15 UTC+3	Bayesh 19'; Hussein 43'	Report	Surag 28'	Stadium: Basra International Stadium; Attendance: 64,520; Referee: Ma Ning (China)

19 January 2023 25th Arabian Gulf Cup	Iraq	3–2 (a.e.t.)	Oman	Basra, Iraq
19:00 UTC+3	Bayesh 24'; Attwan 116' (pen.); Younis 120+2'	Report	Al-Yahyaei 90+10' (pen.); Al-Malki 119'	Stadium: Basra International Stadium; Attendance: 64,570; Referee: István Kovács (Romania)

26 March 2023 Friendly	Russia	2–0	Iraq	Saint Petersburg, Russia
18:00 UTC+3	An. Miranchuk 50'; Pinyayev 58'	Report		Stadium: Gazprom Arena; Referee: Akhrol Riskullayev (Uzbekistan)

16 June 2023 Friendly	Colombia	1–0	Iraq	Valencia, Spain
21:00 UTC+2	Cassierra 76'	Report		Stadium: Mestalla Stadium; Referee: Miguel Nogueira (Portugal)

7 September 2023 2023 King's Cup	Iraq	2–2 (5–4 p)	India	Chiang Mai, Thailand
13:30 UTC+3	Al-Hamadi 28' (pen.); Hussein 80' (pen.)		Naorem 17'; Hassan 51' (o.g.)	Stadium: 700th Anniversary Stadium
	Penalties
	Doski (penalty scored); Adnan (penalty scored); H. Ali (penalty scored); Al-Hamawi (penalty scored); Resan (penalty scored)		(penalty missed) Fernandes; (penalty scored) Jhingan; (penalty scored) Wangjam; (penalty scored) A. Ali; (penalty scored) R. Ali

10 September 2023 2023 King's Cup	Thailand	2–2 (4–5 p)	Iraq	Chiang Mai, Thailand
16:30 UTC+3	Mickelson 37'; Bordin 82'		Hussein 6'; Attwan 65'	Stadium: 700th Anniversary Stadium
	Penalties
	Kritsada (penalty scored); Thitiphan (penalty scored); Pokklaw (penalty scored); Pathompol (penalty missed); Theerathon (penalty scored)		(penalty scored) Abdulla; (penalty scored) Doski; (penalty scored) Farhan; (penalty scored) Bayesh; (penalty scored) Attwan

13 October 2023 2023 Jordan International Tournament	Qatar	0–0 (6–5 p)	Iraq	Amman, Jordan
18:00 UTC+3				Stadium: Amman International Stadium
	Penalties
	Al-Haydos (penalty scored); Fatehi (penalty missed); Alaaeldin (penalty missed); Suhail (penalty scored); Afif (penalty scored); Al-Brake (penalty scored); Gaber (penalty scored); Meshaal (penalty scored)		(penalty scored) Doski; (penalty missed) Al-Hamadi; (penalty missed) Ali; (penalty scored) Adnan; (penalty scored) Allée; (penalty scored) Al-Ammari; (penalty scored) Sulaka; (penalty missed) Resan

17 October 2023 2023 Jordan International Tournament	Jordan	2–2 (3–5 p)	Iraq	Amman, Jordan
17:30 UTC+3	Al-Naimat 31', 79'		Hussein 70'; Al-Hamadi 75'	Stadium: Amman International Stadium
	Penalties
	Al-Mardi (penalty scored); Sadeh (penalty scored); Al-Rashdan (penalty scored); Haddad (penalty missed)		(penalty scored) Doski; (penalty scored) Al-Hamadi; (penalty scored) Adnan; (penalty scored) Hussein; (penalty scored) Attwan

16 November 2023 2026 WCQ/ACQ	Iraq	5–1	Indonesia	Basra, Iraq
17:45 UTC+3	Resan 20'; Amat 35' (o.g.); Rashid 60'; Amyn 81'; Al-Hamadi 88'	Report	Pattynama 45+3'	Stadium: Basra International Stadium; Attendance: 64,447; Referee: Ahmed Eisa (United Arab Emirates)

21 November 2023 2026 WCQ/ACQ	Vietnam	0–1	Iraq	Hanoi, Vietnam
15:00 UTC+3			Ali 90+7'	Stadium: Mỹ Đình National Stadium; Referee: Abdulla Al-Marri (Qatar)

=== 2024 ===
6 January 2024 Friendly	South Korea	1–0	Iraq	Abu Dhabi, United Arab Emirates
17:00 UTC+4	Lee Jae-sung 42'	Report		Stadium: New York University Stadium; Attendance: 100; Referee: Yahya Ali Al-Mulla (United Arab Emirates)

15 January 2024 2023 AFC Asian Cup	Indonesia	1–3	Iraq	Al Rayyan, Qatar
17:30 UTC+3	Marselino 37'	Report	Ali 17'; Rashid 45+7'; Hussein 75'	Stadium: Ahmad bin Ali Stadium; Attendance: 16,532; Referee: Ilgiz Tantashev (Uzbekistan)

19 January 2024 2023 AFC Asian Cup	Iraq	2–1	Japan	Al Rayyan, Qatar
14:30 UTC+3	Hussein 5' 45+4'	Report	Endo 90+3'	Stadium: Education City Stadium; Attendance: 38,663; Referee: Khalid Al-Turais (Saudi Arabia)

24 January 2024 2023 AFC Asian Cup	Iraq	3–2	Vietnam	Al Rayyan, Qatar
14:30 UTC+3	Sulaka 47'; Hussein 73', 90+12' (pen.)	Report	Bùi Hoàng Việt Anh 42'; Nguyễn Quang Hải 90+1'	Stadium: Jassim bin Hamad Stadium; Attendance: 8,932; Referee: Nazmi Nasaruddin (Malaysia)

29 January 2024 2023 AFC Asian Cup	Iraq	2–3	Jordan	Al Rayyan, Qatar
14:30 UTC+3	Natiq 68'; Hussein 76' (yellow card) 45+3' (yellow-red card) 77'	Report	Al-Naimat 45+1'; Al-Arab 90+5'; Al-Rashdan 90+7'	Stadium: Khalifa International Stadium; Attendance: 35,814; Referee: Alireza Faghani (Australia)

21 March 2024 2026 WCQ/ACQ	Iraq	1–0	Philippines	Basra, Iraq
22:00 UTC+3	Ali 84'	Report (FIFA); Report (AFC)		Stadium: Basra International Stadium; Attendance: 63,750; Referee: Abdullah Jamali (Kuwait)

26 March 2024 2026 WCQ/ACQ	Philippines	0–5	Iraq	Manila, Philippines
19:00 UTC+8		Report (FIFA); Report (AFC)	Hussein 14', 36'; Al-Ammari 30'; Iqbal 62'; Tahseen 77'	Stadium: Rizal Memorial Stadium; Attendance: 10,014; Referee: Nazmi Nasaruddin (Malaysia)

6 June 2024 2026 WCQ/ACQ	Indonesia	0–2	Iraq	Jakarta, Indonesia
16:00 UTC+7		Report (FIFA); Report (AFC)	Hussein 54' (pen.); Jasim 88'	Stadium: Gelora Bung Karno Stadium; Attendance: 60,245; Referee: Shaun Evans (Australia)

11 June 2024 2026 WCQ/ACQ	Iraq	3–1	Vietnam	Basra, Iraq
21:00 UTC+3	H. Ali 12'; Jasim 71'; Hussein 90+2'	Report (FIFA); Report (AFC)	Phạm Tuấn Hải 84'	Stadium: Basra International Stadium; Attendance: 42,791; Referee: Omar Al-Ali (United Arab Emirates)

5 September 2024 2026 WCQ	Iraq	1–0	Oman	Basra, Iraq
19:00 UTC+3	Hussein 13'	Report		Stadium: Basra International Stadium; Attendance: 63,720; Referee: Khalid Al-Turais (Saudi Arabia)

10 September 2024 2026 WCQ	Kuwait	0–0	Iraq	Kuwait City, Kuwait
21:00 UTC+3		Report		Stadium: Jaber Al-Ahmad International Stadium; Attendance: 58,000; Referee: Hiroyuki Kimura (Japan)

10 October 2024 2026 WCQ	Iraq	1–0	Palestine	Basra, Iraq
21:00 UTC+3	Hussein 31'	Report		Stadium: Basra International Stadium; Attendance: 44,773; Referee: Adel Al-Naqbi (United Arab Emirates)

15 October 2024 2026 WCQ	South Korea	3–2	Iraq	Yongin, South Korea
20:00 UTC+9	Oh Se-hun 41'; Oh Hyeon-gyu 74'; Lee Jae-sung 83'	Report	Hussein 50'; Bayesh 90+5'	Stadium: Yongin Mireu Stadium; Attendance: 35,198; Referee: Rustam Lutfullin (Uzbekistan)

14 November 2024 2026 WCQ	Iraq	0–0	Jordan	Basra, Iraq
--:-- UTC+3				Stadium: Basra International Stadium; Attendance: 65,000; Referee: Mohammed Al Hoish (Saudi Arabia)

19 November 2024 2026 WCQ	Oman	0–1	Iraq	Muscat, Oman
--:-- UTC+4		Report	Amyn 36'	Stadium: Sultan Qaboos Sports Complex, Muscat; Referee: Omar Mohamed Al Ali (United Arab Emirates)

22 December 2024 26th Arabian Gulf Cup	Iraq	1–0	Yemen	Kuwait City, Kuwait
17:25 UTC+3	Hussein 64'			Stadium: Sulaibikhat Stadium; Attendance: 7,203; Referee: Abdulrahman Al-Jassim (Qatar)

25 December 2024 26th Arabian Gulf Cup	Bahrain	2–0	Iraq	Kuwait City, Kuwait
20:30 UTC+3	Madan 38', 47'			Stadium: Jaber International Stadium; Attendance: 13,150; Referee: Halil Umut Meler (Turkey)

28 December 2024 26th Arabian Gulf Cup	Iraq	1–3	Saudi Arabia	Kuwait City, Kuwait
17:30 UTC+3	Ali 64'		Al-Dawsari 57' (pen.); Al-Hamdan 81', 86'	Stadium: Jaber International Stadium; Attendance: 54,942; Referee: István Kovács (Romania)

=== 2025 ===
20 March 2025 2026 WCQ	Iraq	2–2	Kuwait	Basra, Iraq
21:15 UTC+3	Hashim 90+3'; Bayesh 90+11'	Report	Nasser 39', 70'	Stadium: Basra International Stadium; Referee: Ma Ning (China)

25 March 2025 2026 WCQ	Palestine	2–1	Iraq	Amman, Jordan
21:15 UTC+3	Abou Ali 88'; Mahajna 90+7'	Report	Hussein 34'	Stadium: Amman International Stadium; Referee: Khalid Al-Turais (Saudi Arabia)

5 June 2025 2026 WCQ	Iraq	0–2	South Korea	Basra, Iraq
21:15 UTC+3		Report	Kim Jin-gyu 63'; Oh Hyeon-gyu 82'	Stadium: Basra International Stadium; Attendance: 55,972; Referee: Yusuke Araki (Japan)

10 June 2025 2026 WCQ	Jordan	0–1	Iraq	Amman, Jordan
21:15 UTC+3		Report	Jassim 77'	Stadium: Amman International Stadium; Attendance: 15,502; Referee: Omar Al-Ali (United Arab Emirates)

4 September 2025 2025 King's Cup	Iraq	2–1	Hong Kong	Kanchanaburi, Thailand
16:00 UTC+7	Ali 67', 80'	Report	Orr 61' (pen.)	Stadium: Kanchanaburi Province Stadium; Referee: Mongkolchai Pechsri (Thailand)

7 September 2025 2025 King's Cup	Thailand	0–1	Iraq	Kanchanaburi, Thailand
20:00 UTC+7		Report	Ali 75'	Stadium: Kanchanaburi Province Stadium; Attendance: 13,987; Referee: Nazmi Nasaruddin (Malaysia)

11 October 2025 2026 WCQ	Iraq	1–0	Indonesia	Jeddah, Saudi Arabia
22:30 UTC+3	Iqbal 76'	Report		Stadium: King Abdullah Sports City Stadium; Attendance: 14,687; Referee: Ma Ning (China)

14 October 2025 2026 WCQ	Saudi Arabia	0–0	Iraq	Jeddah, Saudi Arabia
21:45 UTC+3		Report		Stadium: King Abdullah Sports City Stadium; Attendance: 60,816; Referee: Adham Makhadmeh (Jordan)

13 November 2025 2026 WCQ	United Arab Emirates	1–1	Iraq	Abu Dhabi, United Arab Emirates
20:00 UTC+4	Luanzinho 18'	Report	Al-Hamadi 10'	Stadium: Mohammed bin Zayed Stadium; Attendance: 32,008; Referee: Shaun Evans (Australia)

18 November 2025 2026 WCQ	Iraq	2–1	United Arab Emirates	Basra, Iraq
19:00 UTC+3	Ali 66'; Al-Ammari 90+17' (pen.)	Report	Caio Lucas 52'	Stadium: Basra International Stadium; Attendance: 62,444; Referee: Yusuke Araki (Japan)

3 December 2025 2025 FIFA Arab Cup	Iraq	2–1	Bahrain	Doha, Qatar
17:30 UTC+3	Lutfalla (o.g.); Ali 25'	Report	Hashim 79'	Stadium: Stadium 974; Attendance: 9,358; Referee: Pierre Ghislain Atcho (Gabon)

6 December 2025 2025 FIFA Arab Cup	Sudan	0–2	Iraq	Doha, Qatar
19:00 UTC+3	Ali 81'; Attwan 84'	Report		Stadium: Stadium 974; Attendance: 38,639; Referee: Adham Mohammed Tumah (Japan)

9 December 2025 2025 FIFA Arab Cup	Algeria	2–0	Iraq	Al Rayyan, Qatar
20:00 UTC+3	Tougai 45+1'; Natiq (o.g.)	Report		Stadium: Khalifa International Stadium; Attendance: 34,148; Referee: Abdulrahman Ibrahim Al-Jassim (Qatar)

12 December 2025 2025 FIFA Arab Cup	Jordan	1–0	Iraq	Al Rayyan, Qatar
17:30 UTC+3	Olwan 41' (pen.)	Report		Stadium: Education City Stadium; Attendance: 43,486; Referee: Espen Andreas Eskås (Norway)

=== 2026 ===
31 March 2026 2026 WCQ inter-confederation play-offs	Iraq	2–1	Bolivia	Guadalupe, Mexico
21:00 UTC−6	Al-Hamadi 10'; Hussein 53'	Report	Paniagua 38'	Stadium: Estadio BBVA; Attendance: 49,286; Referee: Iván Barton (El Salvador)

29 May 2026 Friendly	Andorra	0–1	Iraq	Girona, Spain
18:00 UTC+2			Yousif 20'	Stadium: Estadi Montilivi

4 June 2026 Friendly	Spain	1–1	Iraq	A Coruña, Spain
21:00 UTC+2	Torres 16'	Report	Doski 27'	Stadium: Estadio Riazor; Referee: Florian Badstübner (Germany)

9 June 2026 Friendly	Venezuela	2–0	Iraq	Illinois, United States
20:00 UTC−5	Cásseres Jr. 17'; Ramírez 46'			Stadium: SeatGeek Stadium; Referee: Filip Dujic (Canada)

16 June 2026 2026 FIFA World Cup	Iraq	1–4	Norway	Foxborough, United States
18:00 UTC−4	Hussein 39'	Report	Haaland 29', 43'; Østigård 76'; Hussein 90+6' (o.g.)	Stadium: Gillette Stadium; Attendance: 63,106; Referee: Pierre Atcho (Gabon)

22 June 2026 2026 FIFA World Cup	France	3–0	Iraq	Philadelphia, United States
17:00 UTC−4	Mbappé 14', 54'; Dembélé 66'	Report		Stadium: Lincoln Financial Field; Attendance: 68,324; Referee: Drew Fischer (Canada)

26 June 2026 2026 FIFA World Cup	Senegal	5–0	Iraq	Toronto, Canada
15:00 UTC−4	Diarra 4'; I. Sarr 56'; P. Gueye 59', 71'; I. Ndiaye 82'	Report		Stadium: BMO Field; Attendance: 43,036; Referee: Anthony Taylor (England)

23 September 2026 27th Arabian Gulf Cup	Iraq	1–1	Oman	Jeddah, Saudi Arabia
17:30 UTC+3	Qasim 6'	Report	Al-Rawahi 67'	Stadium: Prince Abdullah Al-Faisal Sports City Stadium; Referee: Omar Al-Ali (United Arab Emirates)

26 September 2026 27th Arabian Gulf Cup	Kuwait	2–3	Iraq	Jeddah, Saudi Arabia
18:55 UTC+3	Nasser 75' (pen.), 90'	Report	Iqbal 52'; Rasheed 83'; Nabeel 90+9'	Stadium: Prince Abdullah Al-Faisal Sports City Stadium; Attendance: 6,196; Referee: Jalal Jayed (Morocco)

29 September 2026 27th Arabian Gulf Cup	Saudi Arabia	2–0	Iraq	Jeddah, Saudi Arabia
20:30 UTC+3	Al-Salem 55'; Al-Hamdan 69'	Report		Stadium: King Abdullah Sports City Stadium; Attendance: 41,594; Referee: Danny Makkelie (Netherlands)

13 November 2026 2026 Basra International Tournament	Iraq	0–0	Lebanon	Basra, Iraq
18:00 UTC+3		Report		Stadium: Basra International Stadium; Attendance: 21,762; Referee: Ali Abbas (Kuwait)

17 November 2026 2026 Basra International Tournament	Iraq	1–1	Iran	Basra, Iraq
19:15 UTC+3	Al-Saedi 1'	Report	Hazbavi 83'	Stadium: Basra International Stadium; Referee: Ammar Ashkanani (Kuwait)
