= Vyacheslav Ambartsumyan =

Soviet footballer

Personal information
- Full name: Vyacheslav Miranovich Ambartsumyan
- Date of birth: 22 June 1940
- Place of birth: Moscow, USSR
- Date of death: 4 January 2008 (aged 67)
- Place of death: Moscow, Russia
- Positions: Striker; midfielder

Youth career
- FShM Moscow

Senior career*
Years	Team	Apps	(Gls)
1959	FC Spartak Moscow	8	(0)
1960–1962	CSKA Moscow	66	(11)
1963–1971	FC Spartak Moscow	165	(31)
1972	FC Torpedo Kutaisi	26	(2)

International career
1961	USSR	2	(0)

Managerial career
- 1973–1978: FShM Moscow (assistant)
- 1979: FC Pakhtakor Tashkent (director)
- 1982–1987: SC EShVSM Moscow (assistant)
- * Club domestic league appearances and goals

Vyacheslav Miranovich Ambartsumyan (Russian: Вячесла́в Мира́нович Амбарцумя́н; 22 June 1940 – 4 January 2008) was a Soviet footballer. A native of Moscow, he played midfielder and forward. He died in 2008 at the age of 67 after being hit by a motorist in Moscow.

== Honours ==
- Soviet Top League winner: 1969.
- Soviet Cup winner: 1963, 1965, 1971.

== International career ==
Ambartsumyan made his debut for USSR on 10 September 1961 in a friendly against Austria. He also played in a 1962 FIFA World Cup qualifier against Turkey.

== External links and references ==
- (in Russian) Profile
- (in Russian) Rambler
