= Nouri Dhiab =

Iraqi footballer (1943–2020)

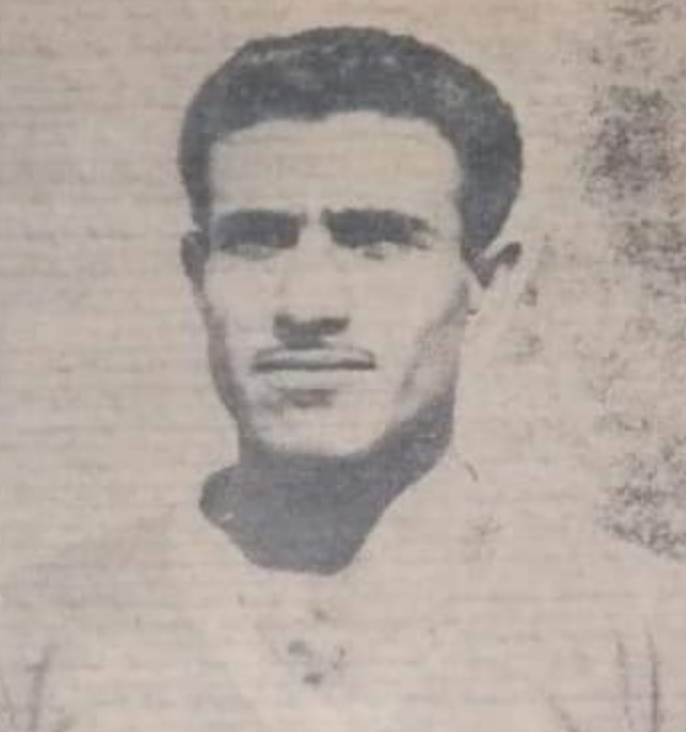

Personal information
- Full name: Nouri Dhiab Sharimt
- Date of birth: 1 July 1943
- Place of birth: Iraq
- Date of death: 22 June 2020 (aged 76)
- Position: Forward

International career
Years	Team	Apps	(Gls)
1965–1971	Iraq	15	(11)

Nouri Dhiab (1 July 1943 – 22 June 2020) was an Iraqi football forward who played for Iraq national football team between 1965 and 1971. He played 15 matches and scored 11 goals.

Dhiab died on 22 June 2020 at the age of 76.

== Career statistics ==
=== International goals ===
Scores and results list Iraq's goal tally first.

No	Date	Venue	Opponent	Score	Result	Competition
1.	4 April 1966	Al-Kashafa Stadium, Baghdad	Jordan	2–1	3–1	1966 Arab Nations Cup
2.	5 April 1966	Al-Kashafa Stadium, Baghdad	Bahrain	1–1	10–1	1966 Arab Nations Cup
3.	5 April 1966	Al-Kashafa Stadium, Baghdad	Bahrain	2–1	10–1	1966 Arab Nations Cup
4.	5 April 1966	Al-Kashafa Stadium, Baghdad	Bahrain	3–1	10–1	1966 Arab Nations Cup
5.	5 April 1966	Al-Kashafa Stadium, Baghdad	Bahrain	4–1	10–1	1966 Arab Nations Cup
6.	16 January 1968	Supachalasai Stadium, Bangkok	Thailand	1–0	4–0	1968 Olympics qualifiers
7.	16 January 1968	Supachalasai Stadium, Bangkok	Thailand	3–0	4–0	1968 Olympics qualifiers
8.	18 January 1968	Supachalasai Stadium, Bangkok	Indonesia	1–2	1–2	1968 Olympics qualifiers
9.	20 January 1968	Supachalasai Stadium, Bangkok	Thailand	1–1	1–2	1968 Olympics qualifiers
10.	22 January 1968	Supachalasai Stadium, Bangkok	Indonesia	1–1	1–1	1968 Olympics qualifiers
11.	7 March 1969	Azadi Stadium, Tehran	Iran	1–0	1–2	1969 Friendship Cup
