= Qasim Mahmoud =

Iraqi association football player

Qasim Zwea
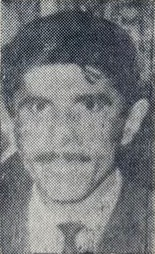

Personal information
- Full name: Qasim Mahmoud
- Date of birth: 4 July 1939
- Place of birth: Baghdad, Iraq
- Date of death: 2 July 2014 (aged 74)
- Place of death: Baghdad, Iraq
- Position: Forward

Senior career*
Years	Team	Apps	(Gls)
1956–1964	Al Nahda Club	–	(–)
1964–1974	Al-Quwa Al-Jawiya	–	(–)

International career
1957–1968	Iraq		
- * Club domestic league appearances and goals

Qasim Mahmoud , known as Qasim Zwea (4 July 1942 – 2 July 2014) was a former Iraqi football forward who played for Iraq between 1957 and 1968. He played in the 1964 Arab Nations Cup and 1966 Arab Nations Cup.

He died of cancer on 2 July 2014.

== Career statistics ==
=== International goals ===
Scores and results list Iraq's goal tally first.

No	Date	Venue	Opponent	Score	Result	Competition
1.	16 November 1964	Shuwaikh High School Stadium, Kuwait City	Jordan	2–1	3–1	1964 Arab Nations Cup
2.	8 April 1966	Al-Kashafa Stadium, Baghdad	Libya	1–0	3–1	1966 Arab Nations Cup
