= 2003 LG Cup (Iran) =

2003 LG Cup Four Nations Tournament
Tournament details
- Host country: Iran
- City: Tehran
- Dates: 13–15 August
- Teams: 4
- Venue: (in 1 host city)

Final positions
- Champions: Uruguay (1st title)
- Runners-up: Iraq
- Third place: Iran
- Fourth place: Cameroon

Tournament statistics
- Matches played: 4
- Goals scored: 17 (4.25 per match)
- Top scorer: (Uruguay) Carlos Bueno (4 goals)

The LG Cup Four Nations is an exhibition association football tournament that took place in Iran.

== Participating nations ==
Country	Confederation	FIFA ranking (30 July 2003)
Cameroon B	CAF	12
Iran (hosts)	AFC	42
Iraq	AFC	70
Uruguay	CONMEBOL	26

== Venues ==
Tehran is located in Iran	Tehran
Tehran is located in Iran	Azadi Stadium
Tehran is located in Iran	Capacity: 100,000

== Results ==
=== Semifinals ===
13 August 2003

Uruguay	4–0	Cameroon B
Bueno 32', 46'; Peralta 59'; Estoyanoff 66'	Report

Azadi Stadium, Tehran

13 August 2003

Iran	0–1	Iraq
	Report; Report	Swadi 53'

Azadi Stadium, Tehran

=== Third place match ===
15 August 2003

Iran	4–1	Cameroon B
Majidi 11'; Daei 13'; 32' (o.g.); Kazemian 84'	Report; Report	Ndembe 89'

Azadi Stadium, Tehran

=== Final ===
15 August 2003

Uruguay	5–2	Iraq
Ligüera 31', 39', 81'; Bueno 66', 70'	Report	Mohammed 58'; Wahaib 85' (pen.)

Azadi Stadium, Tehran
Referee: Rahim Rahimi-Moqaddam (Iran)

2003 LG Cup (Iran) winner

Uruguay
First title

== Scorers ==
4 goal

- (Uruguay) Carlos Bueno

3 goal

- (Uruguay) Martín Ligüera

1 goal

- (Cameroon) B Ndembe
- (Iran) Farhad Majidi
- (Iran) Ali Daei
- (Iran) Javad Kazemian
- (Iraq) Ali Wahaib
- (Iraq) Hesham Mohammed
- (Iraq) Jassim Swadi
- (Uruguay) Horacio Peralta
- (Uruguay) Fabián Estoyanoff

== See also ==
- LG Cup
