= Hisham Atta =

Iraqi association football player

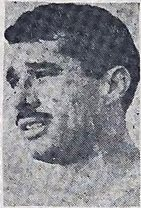

Personal information
- Full name: Hisham Atta Ajaj
- Date of birth: 1 January 1941 (age 85)
- Place of birth: Iraq
- Position: Forward

International career
Years	Team	Apps	(Gls)
1964–1968	Iraq	12	(7)

Hisham Atta Ajaj (Arabic: هِشَام عَطَا عَجَاج; born 1 January 1941) is a former Iraqi football forward who played for Iraq between 1964 and 1968. He played 12 matches and scored 6 goals. Atta was the top scorer of the 1964 Arab Nations Cup with 3 goals.

== Career statistics ==
=== International goals ===
Scores and results list Iraq's goal tally first.

No	Date	Venue	Opponent	Score	Result	Competition
1.	18 November 1964	National Stadium, Kuwait City	Jordan	1–0	3–1	1964 Arab Nations Cup
2.	18 November 1964	National Stadium, Kuwait City	Jordan	2–0	3–1	1964 Arab Nations Cup
3.	20 November 1964	National Stadium, Kuwait City	Libya	1–1	1–1	1964 Arab Nations Cup
4.	3 April 1966	Al-Kashafa Stadium, Baghdad	Jordan	2–1	2–1	1966 Arab Nations Cup
5.	4 April 1966	Al-Kashafa Stadium, Baghdad	Kuwait	3–1	3–1	1966 Arab Nations Cup
6.	8 April 1966	Al-Kashafa Stadium, Baghdad	Libya	3–1	3–1	1966 Arab Nations Cup
7.	16 January 1968	Supachalasai Stadium, Bangkok	Thailand	2–0	4–0	1968 Olympics qualifiers
