= Iraq national football team results (1970–1979) =

This is a list of the Iraq national football team results from 1970 to 1979.

== Results ==
Win Draw Loss Fixtures

=== 1970s ===
1970

22 July 1970 Friendly	Poland	2–0	Iraq	Szczecin, Poland
				Stadium: Stadion Florian Krygier

26 July 1970 Friendly	East Germany	5–0	Iraq	Jena, East Germany
				Stadium: Ernst-Abbe-Sportfeld

1971

28 January 1971 Friendly	Iraq	2–0	Kuwait	Baghdad, Iraq
	Hajim; Kadhim			Stadium: Al-Shaab Stadium

20 June 1971 1972 Olympics qualifiers	Lebanon	1–0	Iraq	Beirut, Lebanon
	Torikian 58'

14 July 1971 1972 Olympics qualifiers	Iraq	1–0	Lebanon	Baghdad, Iraq
	Jassam 55'			Stadium: Al-Shaab Stadium

19 September 1971 1972 Olympics qualifiers	Iraq	2–1	Lebanon	Istanbul, Turkey
	D.Aziz 27' (pen.); T.Aziz 87'		Hamzé 89'

12 November 1971 1972 Olympics qualifiers	Iraq	1–0	North Korea	Baghdad, Iraq
	Hatim 12'			Stadium: Al-Shaab Stadium

19 November 1971 Friendly	Iraq	3–1	Kuwait	Baghdad, Iraq
	Nouri 1'; Aziz 75'; Nuri 76'			Stadium: Al-Shaab Stadium

28 November 1971 1972 Olympics qualifiers	North Korea	3–0	Iraq	Pyongyang, North Korea

10 December 1971 1972 ACQ	Iraq	1–1 (a.e.t.) (2–4 p)	Kuwait	Kuwait City, Kuwait
	Aziz 15'

13 December 1971 1972 ACQ	Iraq	5–0	Ceylon	Kuwait City, Kuwait
	Kadhim 32', 42', 69'; Kamil 51'; Khalaf 88'

15 December 1971 1972 ACQ	Iraq	1–0	Bahrain	Kuwait City, Kuwait
	Kadhim 89'

18 December 1971 1972 ACQ	Iraq	2–0	Jordan	Kuwait City, Kuwait
	Ahmed 11'; Kadhim 62'

22 December 1971 1972 ACQ	Iraq	4–1	Lebanon	Kuwait City, Kuwait
	Kadhim 40', 53'; Aziz 65'; Ahmed 83'

24 December 1971 1972 ACQ	Iraq	1–0	Kuwait	Kuwait City, Kuwait
	Nouri 90+4'

1972

1 January 1972 1972 Palestine Cup	Iraq	0–0	Egypt	Baghdad, Iraq
				Stadium: Al-Shaab Stadium

5 January 1972 1972 Palestine Cup	Iraq	3–0	Libya	Baghdad, Iraq
	Kadhim 17', 18'; Ahmed 26'			Stadium: Al-Shaab Stadium

7 January 1972 1972 Palestine Cup	Iraq	3–1	Kuwait	Baghdad, Iraq
	S.Yousif 18'; Kadhim 71'; Hatim 77'			Stadium: Al-Shaab Stadium

12 January 1972 1972 Palestine Cup	Iraq	3–1	Algeria	Baghdad, Iraq
	Kamil 1', 20'; Kadhim 15'			Stadium: Al-Shaab Stadium

14 January 1972 1972 Palestine Cup	Iraq	1–3	Egypt	Baghdad, Iraq
	Aziz 34'			Stadium: Al-Shaab Stadium

7 May 1972 1972 AFC Asian Cup	South Korea	0–0 (a.e.t.) (2–4 p)	Iraq	Bangkok, Thailand
				Stadium: National Stadium
	Penalties
	Cha Bum-Kun (penalty scored); Hwang Jae-Man (penalty scored); Park Su-Deok (penalty missed)		(penalty scored) Aziz; (penalty scored) Nouri; (penalty scored) Kadhim; (penalty scored) Fathi

9 May 1972 1972 AFC Asian Cup	Iran	3–0	Iraq	Bangkok, Thailand
	Kalani 34', 70', 78'			Stadium: National Stadium; Attendance: 5,000; Referee: Sivapalan Kathiravale (Malaysia)

11 May 1972 1972 AFC Asian Cup	Thailand	1–1	Iraq	Bangkok, Thailand
	Supakit 57'		A.Yousif 6'	Stadium: National Stadium

1973

11 March 1973 1974 WCQ	Australia	3–1	Iraq	Sydney, Australia
	Richards 49'; Alston 80', 85'		Nouri 89'	Stadium: Sydney Sports Ground; Attendance: 28,514; Referee: Govindasamy Suppiah (Singapore)

13 March 1973 1974 WCQ	Iraq	2–0	New Zealand	Sydney, Australia
	Rashid 10'; Hatim 40'			Stadium: Sydney Sports Ground; Attendance: 12,763; Referee: Fernando Alvarez (Philippines)

16 March 1973 1974 WCQ	Iraq	1–1	Indonesia	Sydney, Australia
	Kadhim 23'		Idris 43'	Stadium: Sydney Sports Ground; Attendance: 14,071; Referee: Kim Joo-Wom (Korea Republic)

18 March 1973 1974 WCQ	Australia	0–0	Iraq	Melbourne, Australia
				Stadium: Olympic Park; Attendance: 10,684; Referee: Masatoshi Nagashima (Japan)

21 March 1973 1974 WCQ	Iraq	3–2	Indonesia	Sydney, Australia
	Aziz 22' (pen.); Obeid 33'; Nouri 72'		Panggabean 25'; Asmara 58'	Stadium: Sydney Sports Ground; Attendance: 2,000; Referee: Luk Tat Sun (Hong Kong)

24 March 1973 1974 WCQ	Iraq	4–0	New Zealand	Sydney, Australia
	Hatim 4', 15', 67'; Kadhim 23'			Stadium: Sydney Sports Ground; Attendance: 12,390; Referee: Kim Joo-Won (Korea Republic)

12 August 1973 1973 Palestine Cup	Iraq	2–0	South Yemen	Benghazi, Libya
	Luaibi; Hanoon			Stadium: Sports City Stadium

15 August 1973 1973 Palestine Cup	Algeria	0–0	Iraq	Benghazi, Libya
				Stadium: Sports City Stadium

18 August 1973 1973 Palestine Cup	Libya	0–0	Iraq	Benghazi, Libya
				Stadium: Sports City Stadium

20 August 1973 1973 Palestine Cup	United Arab Emirates	1–3	Iraq	Benghazi, Libya
	Abdel Rahman		Luaibi; Hassan	Stadium: Sports City Stadium

23 August 1973 1973 Palestine Cup	Tunisia	2–0	Iraq	Tripoli, Libya
				Stadium: June 11 Stadium

25 August 1973 1973 Palestine Cup	Algeria	0–0 (a.e.t.) (3–0 p)	Iraq	Tripoli, Libya
				Stadium: June 11 Stadium

1974

22 February 1974 Friendly	Iraq	0–0	Morocco	Baghdad, Iraq
				Stadium: Al-Shaab Stadium

24 February 1974 Friendly	Iraq	0–0	Morocco	Baghdad, Iraq
				Stadium: Al-Shaab Stadium

2 May 1974 Friendly	South Yemen	2–0	Iraq	Aden, South Yemen

2 June 1974 Friendly	Tunisia	2–1	Iraq	Tunis, Tunisia
			Hassan 57'	Stadium: Stade El Menzah

7 June 1974 Friendly	Libya	1–0	Iraq	Tripoli, Libya

14 August 1974 Friendly	Iraq	4–0	Bahrain	Baghdad, Iraq
	Jassam; Hassan; Kadhim			Stadium: Al-Shaab Stadium

3 September 1974 1974 Asian Games	India	0–3	Iraq	Tehran, Iran
			Jassam 19'; Hassan 27'; Kadhim 58'	Stadium: Amjadieh Stadium; Referee: Yoshiyuki Maruyama (Japan)

5 September 1974 1974 Asian Games	China PR	0–1	Iraq	Tehran, Iran
			Hatim 24'	Stadium: Aryamehr Stadium

7 September 1974 1974 Asian Games	North Korea	0–1	Iraq	Tehran, Iran
			Jassam 73'	Stadium: Amjadieh Stadium; Referee: U Tin Htut (Burma

9 September 1974 1974 Asian Games	Iraq	1–1	South Korea	Tehran, Iran
	Jassam 74'		Park Byung-chul 48'	Stadium: Aryamehr Stadium

11 September 1974 1974 Asian Games	Malaysia	0–0	Iraq	Tehran, Iran
				Stadium: Aryamehr Stadium; Referee: Choi (North Korea)

13 September 1974 1974 Asian Games	Iran	1–0	Iraq	Tehran, Iran
	Roshan 76'			Stadium: Aryamehr Stadium; Referee: Yoshiyuki Maruyama (Japan)

1975

1 January 1975 Friendly	Iraq	0–0	Tunisia	Baghdad, Iraq
				Stadium: Al-Shaab Stadium

9 January 1975 Friendly	Iraq	3–1	Libya	Baghdad, Iraq
	Kadhim 1' 86'; Hatim 81'			Stadium: Al-Shaab Stadium

20 August 1975 1976 Olympics qualifiers	Kuwait	1–2	Iraq	Tehran, Iran
			Kadhim 29', 58'	Stadium: Aryamehr Stadium

22 August 1975 1976 Olympics qualifiers	Iraq	0–2	Saudi Arabia	Tehran, Iran
				Stadium: Aryamehr Stadium

26 August 1975 1976 Olympics qualifiers	Iraq	4–0	Bahrain	Tehran, Iran
	Kadhim 27', 30', 70', 87'			Stadium: Aryamehr Stadium

29 August 1975 1976 Olympics qualifiers	Iran	1–0	Iraq	Tehran, Iran
	Khorshidi 66'			Stadium: Aryamehr Stadium

21 November 1975 1976 ACQ	Iraq	1–0	Qatar	Baghdad, Iraq
	Hassan 55'			Stadium: Al-Shaab Stadium

23 November 1975 1976 ACQ	Iraq	3–1	Afghanistan	Baghdad, Iraq
	Subhi 9'; Alwan 17'; Kadhim 78'			Stadium: Al-Shaab Stadium

25 November 1975 1976 ACQ	Iraq	1–1	Saudi Arabia	Baghdad, Iraq
	Ahmed 86'	Report	Mugnim 4'	Stadium: Al-Shaab Stadium

28 November 1975 1976 ACQ	Iraq	3–0	Qatar	Baghdad, Iraq
	Alwan 9'; Hassan 60'; Waal 74'			Stadium: Al-Shaab Stadium

30 November 1975 1976 ACQ	Iraq	4–0	Afghanistan	Baghdad, Iraq
	Mahmoud 2', 5'; Mustafa 70'; Ahmed 84'			Stadium: Al-Shaab Stadium

2 December 1975 1976 ACQ	Iraq	2–1	Saudi Arabia	Baghdad, Iraq
	Subhi 13'; Hassan 42'	Report	Bakhit 54'	Stadium: Al-Shaab Stadium

21 December 1975 1975 Palestine Cup	Iraq	5–0	United Arab Emirates	Tunis, Tunisia
	Subhi 2', 17', 37'; Abdul-Jalil; Alwan

23 December 1975 1975 Palestine Cup	Tunisia	1–1	Iraq	Tunis, Tunisia
	Ouada 80'		Subhi 20'

25 December 1975 1975 Palestine Cup	Iraq	4–0	Syria	Tunis, Tunisia
	Kadhim 2' (pen.), 20'; Hassan 23'; Subhi 73'

28 December 1975 1975 Palestine Cup	Egypt	1–0	Iraq	Tunis, Tunisia
	Abdel Baquy 97'

1976

8 February 1976 Friendly	Iraq	0–0	Turkey	Baghdad, Iraq
				Stadium: Al-Shaab Stadium

17 February 1976 Friendly	Iraq	1–1	East Germany	Baghdad, Iraq
	Abdul-Jalil			Stadium: Al-Shaab Stadium

27 March 1976 4th Arabian Gulf Cup	Iraq	4–0	Oman	Doha, Qatar
	Hassan 33'; Kadhim 68', 80'; 69' (o.g.)			Stadium: Grand Hamad Stadium

29 March 1976 4th Arabian Gulf Cup	Iraq	4–1	Bahrain	Doha, Qatar
	Waal 11'; Hassan 23'; Abdul-Jalil 50'; Kadhim 65'			Stadium: Grand Hamad Stadium

1 April 1976 4th Arabian Gulf Cup	Iraq	7–1	Saudi Arabia	Doha, Qatar
	Waal 3'; Abdul-Jalil 6'; Hassan 25'; Kadhim 45', 60', 68'; Subhi 89'			Stadium: Grand Hamad Stadium

3 April 1976 4th Arabian Gulf Cup	Qatar	0–0	Iraq	Doha, Qatar
				Stadium: Grand Hamad Stadium

6 April 1976 4th Arabian Gulf Cup	Iraq	4–0	United Arab Emirates	Doha, Qatar
	Hussein 11'; Kadhim 34'; Abdul-Jalil 34'; Fartous 44'			Stadium: Grand Hamad Stadium

8 April 1976 4th Arabian Gulf Cup	Kuwait	2–2	Iraq	Doha, Qatar
			Abdul-Jalil 46'; Kadhim 49'	Stadium: Grand Hamad Stadium

16 April 1976 4th Arabian Gulf Cup	Kuwait	4–2	Iraq	Doha, Qatar
			Subhi 9', 50'	Stadium: Grand Hamad Stadium

5 June 1976 1976 AFC Asian Cup	Iran	2–0	Iraq	Tehran, Iran
	Nouraei 45'; Roshan 58'			Stadium: Aryamehr Stadium; Attendance: 50,000; Referee: Marijan Raus (Yugoslavia)

7 June 1976 1976 AFC Asian Cup	Iraq	1–0	South Yemen	Tehran, Iran
	Waal 84'			Stadium: Aryamehr Stadium

10 June 1976 1976 AFC Asian Cup	Kuwait	3–2 (a.e.t.)	Iraq	Tehran, Iran
	Ibrahim 11'; Kameel 77', 100'		Abdul-Jalil 46'; Hassan 85'	Stadium: Aryamehr Stadium; Attendance: 60,000

12 June 1976 1976 AFC Asian Cup	Iraq	0–1	China PR	Tehran, Iran
			He Jia 61'	Stadium: Aryamehr Stadium

5 September 1976 Friendly	Saudi Arabia	0–0	Iraq	Riyadh, Saudi Arabia
				Stadium: King Fahd International Stadium

20 October 1976 Friendly	Iraq	1–0	Libya	Baghdad, Iraq
	Hamparsum 59'			Stadium: Al-Shaab Stadium

22 October 1976 Friendly	Iraq	3–1	Libya	Baghdad, Iraq
	Mustafa; Luaibi 70', 80'			Stadium: Al-Shaab Stadium

1977

25 January 1977 Friendly	Uganda	1–1	Iraq	Kampala, Uganda
			Hassan	Stadium: National Stadium

17 July 1977 Merdeka Tournament	Iraq	2–0	Indonesia	Kuala Lumpur, Malaysia
	Saeed 8'; Abdul-Zahra 47'			Stadium: Merdeka Stadium

19 July 1977 Merdeka Tournament	Iraq	0–0	Libya	Kuala Lumpur, Malaysia
				Stadium: Merdeka Stadium

21 July 1977 Merdeka Tournament	Iraq	3–0	Burma	Kuala Lumpur, Malaysia
	Alwan 39', 72', 88'			Stadium: Merdeka Stadium

23 July 1977 Merdeka Tournament	Malaysia	0–0	Iraq	Kuala Lumpur, Malaysia
				Stadium: Merdeka Stadium

25 July 1977 Merdeka Tournament	Iraq	5–0	Thailand	Kuala Lumpur, Malaysia
	Saeed 6'; Alwan 30', 60', 84'; Abdullah 87'			Stadium: Merdeka Stadium

28 July 1977 Merdeka Tournament	Iraq	1–1	South Korea	Kuala Lumpur, Malaysia
	Saeed 62'			Stadium: Merdeka Stadium

31 July 1977 Merdeka Tournament	South Korea	1–0	Iraq	Kuala Lumpur, Malaysia
				Stadium: Merdeka Stadium

9 December 1977 Friendly	Iraq	3–0	Morocco	Baghdad, Iraq
	Kadhim 27'; Dhurgham 55'; Ahmed 62'			Stadium: Al-Shaab Stadium

26 December 1977 Friendly	Morocco	0–0	Iraq	Fez, Morocco
				Stadium: Fez Stadium

1978

21 February 1978 Friendly	Iraq	3–0	Algeria	Baghdad, Iraq
	Saeed 29', 41', 57'			Stadium: Al-Shaab Stadium

23 February 1978 Friendly	Iraq	1–0	Algeria	Baghdad, Iraq
	Khazal			Stadium: Al-Shaab Stadium

27 February 1978 Friendly	Iraq	1–0	North Korea	Baghdad, Iraq
	Saeed			Stadium: Al-Shaab Stadium

2 July 1978 Friendly	Algeria	1–1	Iraq	Algiers, Algeria
			Subhi	Stadium: Stade 5 Juillet 1962

4 July 1978 Friendly	Algeria	0–0	Iraq	Algiers, Algeria
				Stadium: Stade 5 Juillet 1962

13 July 1978 Merdeka Tournament	Japan	0–0	Iraq	Kuala Lumpur, Malaysia
				Stadium: Merdeka Stadium

15 July 1978 Merdeka Tournament	Syria	1–2	Iraq	Kuala Lumpur, Malaysia
			Hassan 11'; Subhi 84'	Stadium: Merdeka Stadium

17 July 1978 Merdeka Tournament	Iraq	4–0	Indonesia	Kuala Lumpur, Malaysia
	Ahmed 18'; Farhan 25'; Subhi 47', 87'			Stadium: Merdeka Stadium

20 July 1978 Merdeka Tournament	Iraq	3–0	Singapore	Kuala Lumpur, Malaysia
	Saeed 50', 57', 76'			Stadium: Merdeka Stadium

22 July 1978 Merdeka Tournament	South Korea	2–0	Iraq	Kuala Lumpur, Malaysia
				Stadium: Merdeka Stadium

24 July 1978 Merdeka Tournament	Iraq	1–0	Thailand	Kuala Lumpur, Malaysia
	Haidari 14'			Stadium: Merdeka Stadium

26 July 1978 Merdeka Tournament	Malaysia	1–2	Iraq	Kuala Lumpur, Malaysia
			Didah 13'; Ahmed 62'	Stadium: Merdeka Stadium

29 July 1978 Merdeka Tournament	South Korea	2–0	Iraq	Kuala Lumpur, Malaysia
				Stadium: Merdeka Stadium

10 December 1978 1978 Asian Games	Iraq	2–1	Qatar	Bangkok, Thailand
	Subhi 35'; Farhan 90'			Stadium: Rajamangala Stadium

12 December 1978 1978 Asian Games	China PR	0–2	Iraq	Bangkok, Thailand
			Saeed 44'; Didah 62'	Stadium: Rajamangala Stadium

14 December 1978 1978 Asian Games	Iraq	1–1	Saudi Arabia	Bangkok, Thailand
	Ali 40'			Stadium: Rajamangala Stadium

17 December 1978 1978 Asian Games	Iraq	0–1	North Korea	Bangkok, Thailand
				Stadium: Rajamangala Stadium

18 December 1978 1978 Asian Games	Iraq	3–0	Kuwait	Bangkok, Thailand
	Mahmoud 40'; Saeed 55'; Abdul-Sahib 85'			Stadium: Rajamangala Stadium

19 December 1978 1978 Asian Games	India	0–3	Iraq	Bangkok, Thailand
			Mahmoud 20'; Shaker 25'; Saeed 63'	Stadium: Rajamangala Stadium

20 December 1978 1978 Asian Games	Iraq	0–1	China PR	Bangkok, Thailand
				Stadium: Rajamangala Stadium

1979

5 February 1979 Friendly	Iraq	1–0	Finland	Baghdad, Iraq
	Ahmed			Stadium: Al-Shaab Stadium

7 February 1979 Friendly	Iraq	2–0	Finland	Baghdad, Iraq
	Saeed; Mlakh			Stadium: Al-Shaab Stadium

9 February 1979 Friendly	Iraq	1–1	East Germany	Baghdad, Iraq
	Saeed 80'			Stadium: Al-Shaab Stadium

12 February 1979 Friendly	Iraq	2–1	East Germany	Baghdad, Iraq
	Saeed 74', 88'			Stadium: Al-Shaab Stadium

23 March 1979 5th Arabian Gulf Cup	Iraq	4–0	Bahrain	Baghdad, Iraq
	Saeed 48', 88', 90'; Shaker 64'			Stadium: Al-Shaab Stadium

26 March 1979 5th Arabian Gulf Cup	Iraq	2–0	Qatar	Baghdad, Iraq
	Saeed 1', 60' (pen.)			Stadium: Al-Shaab Stadium

29 March 1979 5th Arabian Gulf Cup	Iraq	3–1	Kuwait	Baghdad, Iraq
	Hassan 9'; Ahmed 47'; Abdul-Sahib 90'		Juma'a 75'	Stadium: Al-Shaab Stadium

3 April 1979 5th Arabian Gulf Cup	Iraq	5–0	United Arab Emirates	Baghdad, Iraq
	Ahmed 25'; Abdul-Sahib 40'; Hassan 47'; Saeed 66'; Khudhair 85'			Stadium: Al-Shaab Stadium

5 April 1979 5th Arabian Gulf Cup	Iraq	7–0	Oman	Baghdad, Iraq
	Saeed 30', 32', 40', 86'; Hassan 43', 50'; Khudhair 52'			Stadium: Al-Shaab Stadium

8 April 1979 5th Arabian Gulf Cup	Iraq	2–0	Saudi Arabia	Baghdad, Iraq
	Hassan 24'; Farhan 36'			Stadium: Al-Shaab Stadium

== See also ==
- Iraq national football team results
