= Iraq–Kuwait football rivalry =

International football rivalry

Iraq–Kuwait rivalry
- Other names: Iraq vs Kuwait
- Location: Asia (AFC); West Asia (WAFF)
- Teams: Iraq; Kuwait
- First meeting: 13 November 1964 (62 years ago)
- Latest meeting: Kuwait 2–3 Iraq; 27th Arabian Gulf Cup (26 September 2026)

Statistics
- Total meetings: 44
- Most wins: Iraq (19)
- Largest victory: Iraq 3–0 Kuwait; Asian Games (18 December 1978)

Iraq's rivalry with Kuwait was once considered the Arab world's greatest football rivalry of all time. It began in the mid-1970s. On 2 August 1990, the rivalry between the two switched from the football field to the battlefield during the Iraqi invasion of Kuwait. Because of the Gulf War, Iraq and Kuwait did not meet for more than a decade. As of 26 September 2026, Iraq and Kuwait have played 44 matches against each other, with 19 victories for Iraq, 13 draws, and 12 victories for Kuwait.

== Major tournament matches ==
1972 AFC Asian Cup qualification

10 December 1971

Iraq	1–1	Kuwait
Aziz 15'		Bu Hamad
Penalties
	3–4

Kuwait

1972 AFC Asian Cup qualification

24 December 1971

Iraq	1–0	Kuwait
Nouri 90+4'

Kuwait

1976 AFC Asian Cup

11 June 1976

Kuwait	3–2 (a.e.t.)	Iraq
Ibrahim 11'; Kameel 77', 100'		Abdul-Jalil 46'; Hassan 85'

Aryamehr Stadium, Tehran
Attendance: 60,000

2026 FIFA World Cup qualification

10 September 2024

Kuwait	0–0	Iraq

Jaber Al-Ahmad International Stadium, Kuwait City

2026 FIFA World Cup qualification

20 March 2025

Iraq	2–2	Kuwait
Hashim 90+3'; Bayesh 90+11'		Nasser 39', 70'

Basra International Stadium, Basra

== Matches ==
#	Date	Competition	Home team	Score	Away team	Goals (home)	Goals (away)	Venue
1	13 November 1964	1964 Arab Cup	Kuwait	0–1	Iraq		Ismail 60'	Kuwait City
2	1 April 1966	1966 Arab Cup	Iraq	3–1	Kuwait		Yousif, Dhiab, Atta	(Iraq) Al-Kashafa Stadium, Baghdad
3	28 January 1971	Friendly	Iraq	2–0	Kuwait	Hajim, Kadhim		(Iraq) Al-Shaab Stadium, Baghdad
4	19 November 1971	Friendly	Iraq	3–1	Kuwait	Nouri 1', Aziz 75', Nouri 76'		(Iraq) Al-Shaab Stadium, Baghdad
5	10 December 1971	1972 AFC Asian Cup qualification	Iraq	1–1 (a.e.t.) (Note: Kuwait won on penalties.)	Kuwait	Aziz 15'	Bu Hamad	Kuwait City
6	24 December 1971	1972 AFC Asian Cup qualification	Iraq	1–0	Kuwait	Nouri 90+4'		Kuwait City
7	7 January 1972	1972 Palestine Cup	Iraq	3–1	Kuwait	Yousif, Kadhim, Hatim		(Iraq) Al-Shaab Stadium, Baghdad
8	20 August 1975	1976 Olympic qualification (Note: Not a full FIFA international)	Kuwait	1–2	Iraq		Kadhim 29', 58'	(Iran) Tehran
9	8 April 1976	4th Arabian Gulf Cup	Kuwait	2–2	Iraq		Abdul-Jalil 46', Kadhim 49'	(Qatar) Grand Hamad Stadium, Doha
10	16 April 1976	4th Arabian Gulf Cup	Kuwait	4–2	Iraq		Subhi 9', 50'	(Qatar) Grand Hamad Stadium, Doha
11	10 June 1976	1976 AFC Asian Cup	Kuwait	3–2 (a.e.t.)	Iraq	Ibrahim 11', Kameel 77', 100'	Abdul-Jalil 46', Hassan 85'	(Iran) Aryamehr Stadium, Tehran
12	18 December 1978	1978 Asian Games	Iraq	3–0	Kuwait	Mahmoud 40', Saeed 55', Abdul-Sahib 85'		(Thailand) Rajamangala Stadium, Bangkok
13	29 March 1979	5th Arabian Gulf Cup	Iraq	3–1	Kuwait	Hassan 9', Ahmed 47', Abdul-Sahib 90'	Juma'a 75'	(Iraq) Al-Shaab Stadium, Baghdad
14	26 March 1980	1980 Olympic qualification	Iraq	0–0	Kuwait			(Iraq) Al-Shaab Stadium, Baghdad
15	31 March 1980	1980 Olympic qualification	Iraq	2–3	Kuwait	Ashraf 6', 44'	Yaqoub 69' (pen.), 82', Al-Ghanim 79'	(Iraq) Al-Shaab Stadium, Baghdad
16	9 November 1982	Friendly	Kuwait	1–0	Iraq			Al-Sadaqua Walsalam Stadium, Kuwait City
17	25 November 1982	1982 Asian Games	Iraq	1–2	Kuwait	Hussein 73'	Al-Suwayed 35', Al-Anberi 37'	(India) Jawaharlal Nehru Stadium, New Delhi
18	3 December 1982	1982 Asian Games	Kuwait	0–1	Iraq		Saeed 82'	(India) Jawaharlal Nehru Stadium, New Delhi
19	22 March 1984	7th Arabian Gulf Cup	Iraq	3–1	Kuwait	Saeed 47', 75', Allawi 80'	Fulaiteh 59'	Royal Oman Police Stadium, Muscat
20	3 April 1986	8th Arabian Gulf Cup	Iraq	1–2	Kuwait	Jassim 74'		Bahrain National Stadium, Riffa
21	21 February 1987	Friendly	Kuwait	2–0	Iraq			Al-Kuwait Stadium, Kuwait City
22	18 December 1987	1988 Olympic qualification	Kuwait	2–1	Iraq	Suleiman 6', Al-Hajiri 22'	Karim Allawi 65'	Al-Kuwait Stadium, Kuwait City
23	15 January 1988	1988 Olympic qualification	Iraq	1–0	Kuwait	Karim Allawi 22'		(Oman) Muscat
24	8 March 1988	9th Arabian Gulf Cup	Iraq	1–0	Kuwait	Radhi 39'		(Saudi Arabia) King Fahd International Stadium, Riyadh
25	27 December 1988	Friendly	Iraq	0–2	Kuwait			(Iraq) Al-Shaab Stadium, Baghdad
26	15 October 1989	Friendly	Iraq	1–0	Kuwait	Hashim 60'		(Iraq) Al-Shaab Stadium, Baghdad
27	8 November 1989	1989 Peace and Friendship Cup	Iraq	2–1	Kuwait	Radhi 26', 90'	Al-Saleh 70'	Al-Sadaqua Walsalam Stadium, Kuwait City
28	28 February 1990	10th Arabian Gulf Cup	Iraq	1–1	Kuwait	Hussein 15'	Al-Hadad 48'	Jaber Al-Ahmad International Stadium, Kuwait City
29	26 November 2005	Friendly	Kuwait	0–0	Iraq			Peace & Friendship Stadium, Kuwait City
30	21 March 2008	Friendly	Kuwait	0–0	Iraq			Jaber Al-Ahmad International Stadium, Kuwait City
31	10 January 2009	19th Arabian Gulf Cup	Iraq	1–1	Kuwait	Abdul-Zahra 66'	Khalaf 37'	(Oman) Sultan Qaboos Sports Complex, Muscat
32	17 November 2010	Friendly	Iraq	1–1	Kuwait	Mahmoud 45'		(United Arab Emirates) Sharjah Stadium, Sharjah
33	2 December 2010	20th Arabian Gulf Cup	Kuwait	2–2 (a.e.t.)	Iraq	Al-Mutawa 1', Al-Enezi 58'	Hawar 6', Abdul-Zahra 14'	(Yemen) May 22 Stadium, Aden
34	29 March 2011	Friendly	Kuwait	1–0	Iraq	Al-Musawi 2'		(Yemen) May 22 Stadium, Aden
35	13 July 2011	2011 Fuchs Tournament	Iraq	0–2	Kuwait		Al-Fadhli 66', Al-Fadhel 84'	(Jordan) Amman International Stadium, Amman
36	9 January 2013	21st Arabian Gulf Cup	Iraq	1–0	Kuwait	Ahmad 29'		(Bahrain) Khalifa Sports City Stadium, Isa Town
37	14 November 2014	22nd Arabian Gulf Cup	Iraq	0–1	Kuwait		Al Enezi 90+2'	(Saudi Arabia) Prince Faisal bin Fahd Stadium, Riyadh
38	22 December 2014	Friendly	Iraq	1–1	Kuwait	Mahmoud 85' (pen.)	Ali Maqseed 45' (pen.)	(United Arab Emirates) Al-Rashid Stadium, Dubai
39	10 September 2018	Friendly	Kuwait	2–2	Iraq	Mhawi 46' (o.g.), Al Hajri 77'	M. Ali 5', Faez 65'	Ali Sabah Al-Salem Stadium, Kuwait City
40	27 January 2021	Friendly	Iraq	2–1	Kuwait	Dawood 79', Hussein 89' (pen.)	Al-Rasheedi 22'	(Iraq) Basra International Stadium, Basra
41	30 December 2022	Friendly	Iraq	1–0	Kuwait	Faez 9'		(Iraq) Al-Minaa Olympic Stadium, Basra
42	11 September 2024	2026 FIFA World Cup qualification	Kuwait	0–0	Iraq			Jaber Al-Ahmad International Stadium, Kuwait City
43	20 March 2025	2026 FIFA World Cup qualification	Iraq	2–2	Kuwait	Hashim 90+3', Bayesh 90+11'	Nasser 39', 70'	(Iraq) Basra International Stadium, Basra
44	26 September 2026	27th Arabian Gulf Cup	Kuwait	2–3	Iraq	Nasser 75' (pen.), 90'	Iqbal 52', Rasheed 83', Nabeel 90+9'	(Saudi Arabia) Prince Abdullah Al-Faisal Sports City Stadium, Jeddah

== Statistics ==
Matches held in Iraq	12
Matches held in neutral venue	20
Matches held in Kuwait	12
Total matches	44
Matches won by Iraq	19
Matches won by Kuwait	12
Goals scored by Iraq	59
Goals scored by Kuwait	48

== See also ==
- Iran–Iraq football rivalry
- Iraq–Saudi Arabia football rivalry
