= List of Iraq national football team hat-tricks =

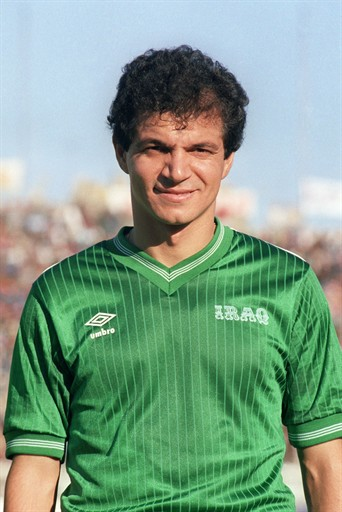
Hussein Saeed scored the most hat-tricks for Iraq, with five.

Since the Iraq national football team's first officially recognised international matches, eighteen players have scored three or more goals (a hat-trick) in a game. The first player to do so was Adil Abdullah, who scored four goals in an 8–0 win against Lebanon in a 1960 Olympic Games qualification match on 25 November 1959.

The most goals scored by a single player in a match for Iraq is five, achieved by Ahmed Radhi in a 1992 Jordan International Tournament match against Ethiopia on 18 August 1992, and by Husham Mohammed in a 2002 FIFA World Cup qualification match against Macau on 12 April 2001.

Hussein Saeed has scored the most hat-tricks for Iraq, with five. He is followed by Ali Kadhim, Ahmed Radhi and Younis Mahmoud, who have each scored three hat-tricks, and Yahya Alwan who has scored two hat-tricks.

The most recent player to score a hat-trick for Iraq was Mohannad Abdul-Raheem, who scored four goals in a 2018 FIFA World Cup qualification match against Thailand on 11 October 2016.

== Hat-tricks ==
Only senior international matches are included in the list.

No.	Date	Goals	Player	Opponent	Venue	Competition	Result (Note: The result is presented with Iraq's score first.)	Ref
1	25 November 1959	4	Adil Abdullah	Lebanon	Al-Kashafa Stadium, Baghdad	1960 Olympic Games qualification	8–0	
2	5 April 1966	4	Nouri Dhiab	Bahrain	Al-Kashafa Stadium, Baghdad	1966 Arab Cup	10–1	
3	13 December 1971	3	Ali Kadhim	Ceylon	Kuwait National Stadium, Kuwait City	1972 AFC Asian Cup qualification	5–0	
4	24 March 1973	3	Sabah Hatim	New Zealand	Sydney Sports Ground, Sydney	1974 FIFA World Cup qualification	4–0	
5	26 August 1975	4	Ali Kadhim (2)	Bahrain	Amjadieh Stadium, Tehran	1976 Olympic Games qualification	4–0	
6	21 December 1975	3	Ahmed Subhi	United Arab Emirates	Stade El Menzah, Tunis	1975 Palestine Cup	5–0	
7	1 April 1976	3	Ali Kadhim (3)	Saudi Arabia	Khalifa International Stadium, Doha	4th Arabian Gulf Cup	7–1	
8	21 July 1977	3	Yahya Alwan	Burma	Merdeka Stadium, Kuala Lumpur	1977 Merdeka Tournament	3–0	
9	25 July 1977	3	Yahya Alwan (2)	Thailand	Merdeka Stadium, Kuala Lumpur	1977 Merdeka Tournament	5–0	
10	21 February 1978	3	Hussein Saeed	Algeria	Al-Shaab Stadium, Baghdad	Friendly	3–0	
11	20 July 1978	3	Hussein Saeed (2)	Singapore	Stadium Merdeka, Kuala Lumpur	1978 Merdeka Tournament	3–0	
12	23 March 1979	3	Hussein Saeed (3)	Bahrain	Al-Shaab Stadium, Baghdad	5th Arabian Gulf Cup	4–0	
13	5 April 1979	4	Hussein Saeed (4)	Oman	Al-Shaab Stadium, Baghdad	5th Arabian Gulf Cup	7–0	
14	10 September 1981	4	Mahdi Abdul-Sahib	Thailand	Merdeka Stadium, Kuala Lumpur	1981 Merdeka Tournament	7–1	
15	19 February 1982	3	Falah Hassan	Jordan	Al-Shaab Stadium, Baghdad	Friendly	3–1	
16	21 February 1982	3	Ghazi Hashim	Jordan	Al-Shaab Stadium, Baghdad	Friendly	7–1	
17	17 March 1984	3	Hussein Saeed (5)	Saudi Arabia	Royal Oman Police Stadium, Muscat	7th Arabian Gulf Cup	4–0	
18	18 March 1985	3	Ahmed Radhi	Lebanon	Al-Sadaqua Walsalam Stadium, Kuwait City	1986 FIFA World Cup qualification	6–0	
19	6 April 1986	3	Rahim Hameed	Oman	Bahrain National Stadium, Riffa	8th Arabian Gulf Cup	3–2	
20	3 February 1989	4	Ahmed Radhi (2)	Jordan	Al-Shaab Stadium, Baghdad	1990 FIFA World Cup qualification	4–0	
21	18 August 1992	5	Ahmed Radhi (3)	Ethiopia	Al-Hassan Stadium, Irbid	1992 Jordan International Tournament	13–0	
22	27 May 2000	3	Razzaq Farhan	Kyrgyzstan	King Abdullah Stadium, Amman	2000 WAFF Championship	4–0	
23	12 April 2001	5	Husham Mohammed	Macau	Al-Shaab Stadium, Baghdad	2002 FIFA World Cup qualification	8–0	
24	8 October 2003	4	Younis Mahmoud	Bahrain	Bukit Jalil Stadium, Kuala Lumpur	2004 AFC Asian Cup qualification	5–1	
25	20 October 2003	3	Younis Mahmoud (2)	Malaysia	Bahrain National Stadium, Manama	2004 AFC Asian Cup qualification	5–1	
26	16 February 2006	3	Emad Mohammed	Thailand	Ayutthaya Stadium, Bangkok	Friendly	3–4	
27	22 October 2007	4	Mahdi Karim	Pakistan	Punjab, Lahore	2010 FIFA World Cup qualification	7–0	
28	29 February 2012	3	Younis Mahmoud (3)	Singapore	Grand Hamad Stadium, Doha	2014 FIFA World Cup qualification	7–1	
29	11 October 2016	4	Mohannad Abdul-Raheem	Thailand	PAS Stadium, Tehran	2018 FIFA World Cup qualification	4–0	

=== Multiple hat-tricks ===
Multiple hat-tricks by player
Rank	Player	Number
1	Hussein Saeed	5
2	Ali Kadhim	3
2	Ahmed Radhi	3
2	Younis Mahmoud	3
5	Yahya Alwan	2

Multiple hat-tricks by opponent
Rank	Opponent	Number
1	Bahrain	4
1	Thailand	4
3	Jordan	3
4	Lebanon	2
4	Oman	2
4	Saudi Arabia	2
4	Singapore	2

== See also ==
- Iraq national football team records and statistics
- List of Iraq international footballers
- List of international goals scored by Hussein Saeed
