= Hassan Farhan =

Iraqi retired footballer

Hassan Farhan Hassoun
Personal information
- Full name: Hassan Farhan Hassoun
- Date of birth: 29 June 1953 (age 73)
- Place of birth: Baghdad, Iraq
- Height: 1.79 m (5 ft 10 in)
- Position: Defender

Senior career*
Years	Team	Apps	(Gls)
1972–1985	Al-Jaish		

International career
1973–1975	Iraq U23	13	
1973–1982	Iraq	101	(7)

Managerial career
- 1996: Al-Quwa Al-Jawiya
- * Club domestic league appearances and goals

Hassan Farhan Hassoun (Arabic: حَسَن فَرْحَان حَسُّون; born 29 June 1953) is an Iraqi retired footballer who played as a defender.

== Club career ==
Farhan played his entire career for Al-Jaish, where he won the 1983–84 Iraqi National League.

== International career ==
He played his first international match against Algeria at the 1973 Palestine Cup of Nations. He won two World Military Cup in 1977 in Damascus and in 1979 in Kuwait, and the 5th Arabian Gulf Cup in Baghdad, scoring in the final group match against Saudi Arabia. In addition, he was the captain of his country during the 1980 Summer Olympics.

=== International goals ===
Scores and results list Iraq's goal tally first.

No	Date	Venue	Opponent	Score	Result	Competition
1.	17 July 1978	Merdeka Stadium, Kuala Lumpur	Indonesia	2–0	4–0	1978 Merdeka Tournament
2.	10 December 1978	Rajamangala Stadium, Bangkok	Qatar	2–1	2–1	1978 Asian Games
3.	8 April 1979	Al-Shaab Stadium, Baghdad	Saudi Arabia	2–0	2–0	5th Arabian Gulf Cup
4.	6 September 1981	Merdeka Stadium, Kuala Lumpur	Thailand	6–1	7–1	1981 Merdeka Tournament
5.	20 March 1982	Zayed Sports City Stadium, Abu Dhabi	Oman	3–0	4–0	6th Arabian Gulf Cup

== Managerial career ==
He managed several teams in different countries, such as in Iraq: Al-Jaish, Ramadi, Al-Kut, Al-Quwa Al-Jawiya, Al-Shorta and Amanat Baghdad; in Jordan: Al-Wehdat and Al-Hussein; in Bahrain: Riffa and Bahrain, where he won the 1988–89 Bahraini Premier League; and in Syria: Al-Wahda.

== See also ==
- List of men's footballers with 100 or more international caps
