= 1975 Palestine Cup of Nations =

1975 Palestine Cup
كأس فلسطين 1975

Tournament details
- Host country: Tunisia
- Dates: 19–28 December
- Teams: 10
- Venue: 1 (in 1 host city)

Final positions
- Champions: Egypt (2nd title)
- Runners-up: Iraq
- Third place: Sudan
- Fourth place: Syria

Tournament statistics
- Matches played: 14
- Goals scored: 36 (2.57 per match)
- Top scorer(s): (Egypt) Hassan Shehata (Iraq) Ahmed Subhi (5 goals)

The 1975 Palestine Cup was the 3rd edition of the Palestine Cup of Nations, it was held in Tunisia between 19 and 28 December. Ten nations took part in the competition of which Egypt won.

== Participated teams ==
The 10 participated teams are:

- Egypt
- Iraq
- Libya
- Mauritania (withdrew)
- Palestine
- Saudi Arabia
- Somalia (withdrew)
- South Yemen
- Sudan
- Syria
- Tunisia (hosts & holders)
- United Arab Emirates

== Group stage ==
=== Group A ===
Team	Pld	W	D	L	GF	GA	GD	Pts
Iraq	2	1	1	0	6	1	+5	3
Tunisia	2	1	1	0	4	1	+3	3
United Arab Emirates	2	0	0	2	0	8	–8	0

19 December 1975

Tunisia	3–0	United Arab Emirates
Bakaou 16'; Ben Aziza 28'; Ben Moussa (?)

Stade El Menzah, Tunis

21 December 1975

Iraq	5–0	United Arab Emirates
Subhi 2', 17', 37'; Alwan; Abdul-Jalil

Tunis

23 December 1975

Tunisia	1–1	Iraq
Ouada 80'		Subhi 20'

Stade El Menzah, Tunis

=== Group B ===
Team	Pld	W	D	L	GF	GA	GD	Pts
Egypt	2	2	0	0	7	1	+6	4
South Yemen	2	1	0	1	1	5	–4	2
Saudi Arabia	2	0	0	2	1	3	–2	0

19 December 1975

Egypt	5–0	South Yemen
Shehata (?); Omasha (?); Basry (?)

Tunis

21 December 1975

South Yemen	1–0	Saudi Arabia
Al-Mass 35'

Stade El Menzah, Tunis

23 December 1975

Egypt	2–1	Saudi Arabia
Abdeldayem 35'; Shehata 78'		Jassim 40'

Stade El Menzah, Tunis

=== Group C ===
Team	Pld	W	D	L	GF	GA	GD	Pts
Syria	2	1	0	1	3	3	0	2
Libya	2	1	0	1	3	3	0	2
Mauritania	Withdrew							

21 December 1975

Syria	3–2	Libya

Tunis

23 December 1975

Libya	1–0	Syria
Penalties
	–

Tunis

=== Group D ===
Team	Pld	W	D	L	GF	GA	GD	Pts
Sudan	2	1	1	0	1	0	+1	3
Palestine	2	0	1	1	0	1	–1	1
Somalia	Withdrew							

21 December 1975

Sudan	0–0	Palestine

Tunis

23 December 1975

Palestine	0–1	Sudan
		(?)

Tunis

== Knockout stage ==
Semifinals
26 December – Tunis
Egypt	3
Sudan	1
26 December – Tunis
Iraq	4
Syria	0

Final
28 December – Tunis
Egypt (a.e.t.)	1
Iraq	0
Third place
28 December – Tunis
Sudan	1
Syria	0

=== Semi-finals ===
26 December 1975

Egypt	3–1	Sudan
Omasha 4'; Shehata 48'; Zizo 75'		(?)

Tunis

26 December 1975

Iraq	4–0	Syria
Kadhim 2' (pen.), 20'; Hassan 23'; Subhi 73'

Tunis

=== 3rd place playoff ===
28 December 1975

Sudan	1–0	Syria
(?)

Tunis

=== Final ===
28 December 1975

Egypt	1–0 (a.e.t.)	Iraq
Abdeldayem 97'

Stade El Menzah, Tunis

== Top scorers ==
Rank	Player	Club	Goals
1	(Egypt) Hassan Shehata	Egypt	5
1	(Iraq) Ahmed Subhi	Iraq	5

== Result ==
1975 Palestine Cup winners

Egypt
Second title
