= Ahmed Subhi =

Iraqi association football player

Personal information
- Full name: Ahmed Subhi
- Date of birth: 1 January 1955 (age 71)
- Place of birth: Iraq
- Position: Forward

Senior career*
Years	Team	Apps	(Gls)
- Al-Karkh SC
- Al-Muwassalat
- Al-Baladiyat
- Al-Jaish SC
- Al-Talaba SC

International career
1974–1978	Iraq		(15)

Managerial career
- 1986: Al-Talaba
- * Club domestic league appearances and goals

Ahmed Subhi (Arabic: أَحْمَد صُبْحِيّ; born 1 January 1955) is a former Iraqi football striker who played for Iraq in the 1976 AFC Asian Cup. He played for the national team between 1974 and 1978 and scored 15 goals. At the club level; he played for Al-Baladiyat; scoring 4 goals in the 1976–77 Iraqi National League season.

== Career statistics ==
=== International goals ===
Scores and results list Iraq's goal tally first.

No.	Date	Venue	Opponent	Score	Result	Competition
1.	23 November 1975	Al-Shaab Stadium, Baghdad	Afghanistan	1–0	3–1	1976 AFC Asian Cup qualification
2.	2 December 1975	Al-Shaab Stadium, Baghdad	Saudi Arabia	1–1	2–1	1976 AFC Asian Cup qualification
3.	21 December 1975	Aryamehr Stadium, Tehran	United Arab Emirates	1–0	5–0	1975 Palestine Cup
4.	21 December 1975	Aryamehr Stadium, Tehran	United Arab Emirates	2–0	5–0	1975 Palestine Cup
5.	21 December 1975	Aryamehr Stadium, Tehran	United Arab Emirates	3–0	5–0	1975 Palestine Cup
6.	23 December 1975	Stade El Menzah, Tunis	Tunisia	1–0	1–1	1975 Palestine Cup
7.	26 December 1975	Stade El Menzah, Tunis	Syria	4–0	4–0	1975 Palestine Cup
8.	1 April 1976	Grand Hamad Stadium, Doha	Saudi Arabia	7–1	7–1	4th Arabian Gulf Cup
9.	15 April 1976	Grand Hamad Stadium, Doha	Kuwait	1–4	2–4	4th Arabian Gulf Cup
10.	15 April 1976	Grand Hamad Stadium, Doha	Kuwait	2–4	2–4	4th Arabian Gulf Cup
11.	2 July 1978	Stade 5 Juillet 1962, Algiers	Algeria	1–0	1–1	Friendly
12.	15 July 1978	Merdeka Stadium, Kuala Lumpur	Syria	2–1	2–1	1978 Merdeka Tournament
13.	17 July 1978	Merdeka Stadium, Kuala Lumpur	Indonesia	3–0	4–0	1978 Merdeka Tournament
14.	17 July 1978	Merdeka Stadium, Kuala Lumpur	Indonesia	4–0	4–0	1978 Merdeka Tournament
15.	10 December 1978	Rajamangala Stadium, Bangkok	Qatar	1–0	2–1	1978 Asian Games
