= Faleh Abed Hajim =

Iraqi footballer (1949–2019)

Falih Abid Hajim
Personal information
- Full name: Falih Abid Hajim
- Date of birth: 1 July 1949
- Place of birth: Al Diwaniyah, Iraq
- Date of death: 18 September 2019 (aged 70)
- Place of death: Al Diwaniyah, Iraq
- Position: Forward

Senior career*
Years	Team	Apps	(Gls)
1966–1968	Al-Rafidain		
1968–1972	Al-Sikak Al-Hadeed		
1972–1974	Al-Diwaniya		

International career
1969	Iraq U20	1	(3)
1969–1971	Iraq	5	(1)
- * Club domestic league appearances and goals

Faleh Abed Hajim (Arabic: فَالِح عَبْد حَاجِم; 1 July 1949 –18 September 2019) was an Iraqi football striker who played for Iraq between 1969 and 1971. He also played for Al-Diwaniya.

== Career statistics ==
=== International goals ===
Scores and results list Iraq's goal tally first.

No	Date	Venue	Opponent	Score	Result	Competition
1.	28 January 1971	Al-Shaab Stadium, Baghdad	Kuwait	1–0	2–0	Friendly
