= 1978 Merdeka Tournament =

Tournament details
- Host country: Malaysia
- Teams: 8 (from 1 confederation)
- Venue: 1 (in 1 host city)

Final positions
- Champions: South Korea (1st title)
- Runners-up: Iraq

Tournament statistics
- Matches played: 28

The 1978 Merdeka Tournament was held in Malaysia from 12 to 29 July. South Korea won the tournament for the fifth time, beating Iraq in the final.

== Matches ==
Pos	Team	Pld	W	D	L	GF	GA	GD	Pts	
1	South Korea	7	7	0	0	18	1	+17	14	Final
2	Iraq	7	5	1	1	12	4	+8	11	Final
3	Malaysia	7	5	0	2	20	8	+12	10	
4	Thailand	7	3	0	4	8	12	−4	6	
5	Japan	7	2	1	4	10	14	−4	5	
6	Singapore	7	2	1	4	7	15	−8	5	
7	Indonesia	7	2	1	4	3	11	−8	5	
8	Syria	7	0	0	7	7	20	−13	0	

Updated to match(es) played on unknown. Source:
12 July 1978

Malaysia	1–3	South Korea
	Report

Merdeka Stadium, Kuala Lumpur

13 July 1978

Japan	0–0	Iraq
	Report

Merdeka Stadium, Kuala Lumpur
13 July 1978

Indonesia	1–0	Syria
Timo Kapisa 51'	Report

Merdeka Stadium, Kuala Lumpur

14 July 1978

Malaysia	6–0	Singapore
	Report

Merdeka Stadium, Kuala Lumpur
14 July 1978

South Korea	3–0	Thailand
	Report

Merdeka Stadium, Kuala Lumpur

15 July 1978

Syria	1–2	Iraq
Goal	Report	Hassan; Subhi

Merdeka Stadium, Kuala Lumpur
15 July 1978

Indonesia	2–1	Japan
Timo Kapisa 66', 68'	Report	Fujishima 25' (pen.)

Merdeka Stadium, Kuala Lumpur

16 July 1978

Malaysia	2–0	Thailand
	Report

Merdeka Stadium, Kuala Lumpur
16 July 1978

South Korea	2–0	Singapore
	Report

Merdeka Stadium, Kuala Lumpur

17 July 1978

Japan	3–2	Syria
Usui 3', 8'; Ochiai 44'	Report	16'; 47'

Merdeka Stadium, Kuala Lumpur
17 July 1978

Iraq	4–0	Indonesia
Farhan; Subhi	Report

Merdeka Stadium, Kuala Lumpur

18 July 1978

Thailand	2–1	Singapore
	Report

Merdeka Stadium, Kuala Lumpur

19 July 1978

Malaysia	1–0	Indonesia
	Report

Merdeka Stadium, Kuala Lumpur
19 July 1978

South Korea	4–0	Japan
25'; 45'; 75'; 85'	Report

Merdeka Stadium, Kuala Lumpur

20 July 1978

Iraq	3–0	Singapore
Saeed	Report

Merdeka Stadium, Kuala Lumpur
20 July 1978

Thailand	3–1	Syria
	Report

Merdeka Stadium, Kuala Lumpur

21 July 1978

Malaysia	4–1	Japan
20'; 32'; 37' (?)	Report	Nishino 8'

Merdeka Stadium, Kuala Lumpur

22 July 1978

Thailand	3–0	Indonesia
	Report

Merdeka Stadium, Kuala Lumpur
22 July 1978

South Korea	2–0	Iraq
	Report

Merdeka Stadium, Kuala Lumpur

23 July 1978

Singapore	2–1	Japan
67'; 69'	Report	Usui 44'

Merdeka Stadium, Kuala Lumpur
23 July 1978

Malaysia	5–2	Syria
	Report

Merdeka Stadium, Kuala Lumpur

24 July 1978

Iraq	1–0	Thailand
	Report

Merdeka Stadium, Kuala Lumpur

25 July 1978

South Korea	2–0	Indonesia
	Report

Merdeka Stadium, Kuala Lumpur
25 July 1978

Singapore	4–1	Syria
	Report

Merdeka Stadium, Kuala Lumpur

26 July 1978

Japan	4–0	Thailand
Hosotani 7'; Ochiai 40'; Usui 86'; Sekiguchi 87'	Report

Merdeka Stadium, Kuala Lumpur
26 July 1978

Malaysia	1–2	Iraq
Goal	Report	Ahmed

Merdeka Stadium, Kuala Lumpur

27 July 1978

Syria	0–2	South Korea
	Report

Merdeka Stadium, Kuala Lumpur
27 July 1978

Indonesia	0–0	Singapore
	Report

Merdeka Stadium, Kuala Lumpur

=== Final ===
29 July 1978

South Korea	2–0	Iraq
	Report

Merdeka Stadium, Kuala Lumpur
