= Ibrahim Ali (footballer) =

Iraqi footballer

Personal information
- Full name: Ibrahim Ali Kadhum
- Date of birth: 1 July 1950 (age 76)
- Position: Defender

Senior career*
Years	Team	Apps	(Gls)
1970–1986	Al Zawraa		

International career
1975–1981	Iraq		

Managerial career
- 2001: Al-Zawraa
- * Club domestic league appearances and goals

Ibrahim Ali Kadhum (Arabic: إِبْرَاهِيم عَلِيّ كَاظِم; born 1 July 1950) is an Iraqi former footballer. He competed in the men's tournament at the 1980 Summer Olympics.

== Career statistics ==
=== International goals ===
Scores and results list Iraq's goal tally first.

No.	Date	Venue	Opponent	Score	Result	Competition
1.	14 December 1978	Rajamangala Stadium, Bangkok	Saudi Arabia	1–0	1–1	1978 Asian Games
