= Falah Hassan =

Iraqi footballer

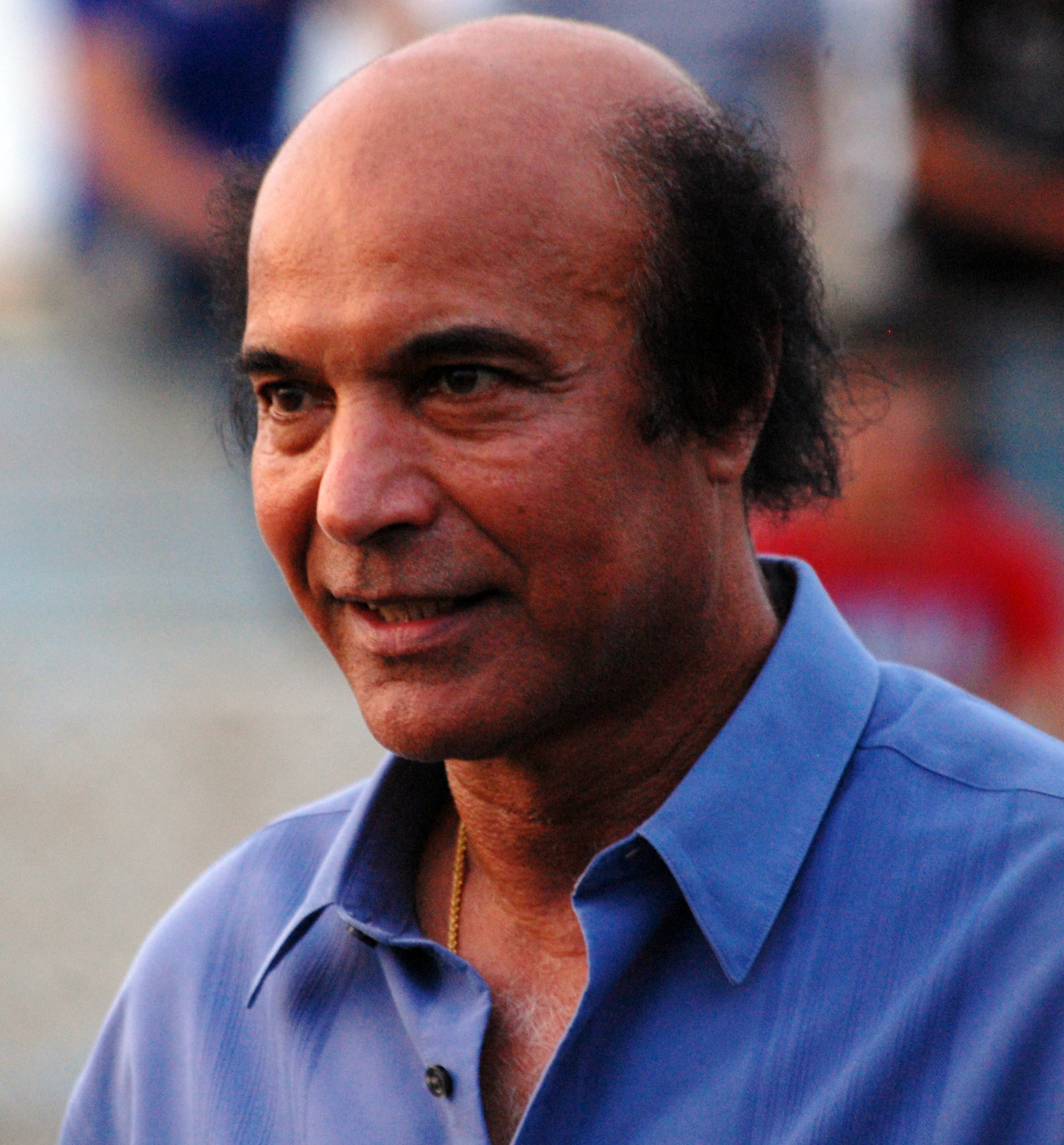
- Falah Hassan in 2012

Personal information
- Full name: Falah Hassan Jassim
- Date of birth: 1 July 1951 (age 75)
- Place of birth: Mimouna, Maysan, Iraq
- Position: Forward

Team information
- Current team: President of Al-Zawraa SC

Senior career*
Years	Team	Apps	(Gls)
1968–1973	Al Bareed		
1973–1975	Al-Quwa Al-Jawiya		
1975–1982	Al Zawraa		
1982–1985	Al Shabab		
1985–1987	Al Zawraa		

International career^{‡}
1970–1986	Iraq	102	(29)

Managerial career
- 1987–1991: Al-Zawraa
- * Club domestic league appearances and goals as of N/A ‡ National team caps and goals as of N/A

Falah Hassan Jassim (Arabic: فَلَّاح حَسَن جَاسِم, born 1 July 1951) is an Iraqi former international football player, and current president of Al-Zawraa Sport Club in Baghdad. He played as a forward.

== Early life ==
Falah Hassan was born in 1951 in the village of Mimouna, in a district of Qal'at Saleh. His father was a farmer and after the 1958 Revolution, his family moved to Al-Thawra (now Al-Sadr) in the Iraqi capital Baghdad, taking advantage of the new government's initiative in building low cost housing for families wanting to move to Baghdad, it was there he first played the game on the streets of the city.

During the 1970s, Falah Hassan was seen as one of the greatest players in Asia, and was offered lucrative contracts to play professionally abroad, in 1978 he received two offers one from Belgium and the other from the Emirates. Al-Shaab from the UAE reportedly offered Falah and teammate Ali Kadhim a contract to play for them in 1978, while after the arrival of Belgium’s army team in Baghdad, the delegation nearly reached an agreement for a move to a club in Belgium however the officials at the Iraqi FA turned it down saying that Falah Hassan was a national treasure, and that he should not be sold abroad. A year earlier in a dire 0–0 draw with English club Derby County in Baghdad, the player ran rings around the opposition defence.

After a dispute with the Iraq FA that led to a suspension from the national side in 1978, Falah returned the following year to guide Iraq to their first Gulf Cup victory, and then went on to lift the 1979 CISM World Military Championship in Kuwait, beating Italy 4–3 on penalties.

== Career statistics ==
=== International goals ===
Scores and results list Iraq's goal tally first.

No	Date	Venue	Opponent	Score	Result	Competition
1.	20 August 1973	March 28 Stadium, Benghazi	United Arab Emirates	3–1	3–1	1973 Palestine Cup
2.	2 June 1974	Stade El Menzah, Tunis	Tunisia	1–2	1–2	Friendly
3.	14 August 1974	Al-Shaab Stadium, Baghdad	Bahrain	3–0	4–0	Friendly
4.	3 September 1974	Amjadieh Stadium, Tehran	India	2–0	3–0	1974 Asian Games
5.	21 November 1975	Al-Shaab Stadium, Baghdad	Qatar	1–0	1–0	1976 AFC Asian Cup qualification
6.	28 November 1975	Al-Shaab Stadium, Baghdad	Qatar	2–0	3–0	1976 AFC Asian Cup qualification
7.	2 December 1975	Al-Shaab Stadium, Baghdad	Saudi Arabia	2–0	2–1	1976 AFC Asian Cup qualification
8.	26 December 1975	Stade El Menzah, Tunis	Syria	3–0	4–0	1975 Palestine Cup
9.	27 March 1976	Grand Hamad Stadium, Doha	Oman	1–0	4–0	4th Arabian Gulf Cup
10.	29 March 1976	Grand Hamad Stadium, Doha	Bahrain	2–0	4–1	4th Arabian Gulf Cup
11.	1 April 1976	Grand Hamad Stadium, Doha	Saudi Arabia	3–0	7–1	4th Arabian Gulf Cup
12.	11 June 1976	Aryamehr Stadium, Tehran	Kuwait	2–2	2–3	1976 AFC Asian Cup
13.	25 January 1977	National Stadium, Kampala	Uganda	1–1	1–1	Friendly
14.	15 July 1978	Merdeka Stadium, Kuala Lumpur	Syria	1–1	2–1	1978 Merdeka Tournament
15.	29 March 1979	Al-Shaab Stadium, Baghdad	Kuwait	1–0	3–1	5th Arabian Gulf Cup
16.	3 April 1979	Al-Shaab Stadium, Baghdad	United Arab Emirates	3–0	5–0	5th Arabian Gulf Cup
17.	6 April 1979	Al-Shaab Stadium, Baghdad	Oman	4–0	7–0	5th Arabian Gulf Cup
18.	6 April 1979	Al-Shaab Stadium, Baghdad	Oman	5–0	7–0	5th Arabian Gulf Cup
19.	8 April 1979	Al-Shaab Stadium, Baghdad	Saudi Arabia	1–0	2–0	5th Arabian Gulf Cup
20.	21 July 1980	Republican Stadium, Kiev	Costa Rica	3–0	3–0	1980 Summer Olympics
21.	25 July 1980	Dinamo Stadium, Minsk	Yugoslavia	1–0	1–1	1980 Summer Olympics
22.	6 February 1981	King Abdullah Stadium, Amman	Jordan	1–0	2–0	Friendly
23.	6 February 1981	King Abdullah Stadium, Amman	Jordan	2–0	2–0	Friendly
24.	16 September 1981	Merdeka Stadium, Kuala Lumpur	Singapore	4–0	4–0	1981 Merdeka Tournament
25.	19 February 1982	Al-Shaab Stadium, Baghdad	Jordan	1–0	3–1	Friendly
26.	19 February 1982	Al-Shaab Stadium, Baghdad	Jordan	2–0	3–1	Friendly
27.	19 February 1982	Al-Shaab Stadium, Baghdad	Jordan	3–0	3–1	Friendly
28.	7 March 1982	Al-Shaab Stadium, Baghdad	South Korea	1–0	3–0	Friendly
29.	7 March 1982	Al-Shaab Stadium, Baghdad	South Korea	2–0	3–0	Friendly

== Post-playing career ==
Falah Hassan has been the president of Al-Zawraa SC since 2010. The club has been into lots of success under Hassan's regime, winning many trophies and playing in Asian competitions.

== See also ==
- List of men's footballers with 100 or more international caps
