= Mohamed Ben Moussa =

Tunisian footballer (1954–2025)

Mohamed Ali Ben Moussa
Personal information
- Full name: Mohamed Ali Ben Moussa
- Date of birth: 5 April 1954
- Place of birth: Tunis, French protectorate of Tunisia
- Date of death: 6 November 2025 (aged 71)
- Position: Left-back

Youth career
- JS El Omrane

Senior career*
Years	Team	Apps	(Gls)
1973–1985	Club Africain		

International career
1974–1978	Tunisia	4	(1)
- * Club domestic league appearances and goals

Mohamed Ali Ben Moussa (Arabic: محمد علي موسى; 5 April 1954 – 6 November 2025) was a Tunisian footballer who played as a defender, mainly as a left-back, for Club Africain and the Tunisia national team.

He began his career with JS El Omrane before joining Club Africain in 1973, where he remained until 1985. During his time at the club, he made over 200 official appearances and contributed to several domestic and regional titles.

Ben Moussa made his international debut for Tunisia on 26 February 1974 in a match against Yugoslavia. He later led the national team, earning a total of four caps and scoring one goal. He was included in Tunisia’s squad for the 1978 FIFA World Cup in Argentina.

== Honours ==
- Tunisian Championship: 1974, 1979, 1980
- Tunisian Cup: 1976
- Tunisian Super Cup: 1979
- Maghreb Cup Winners' Cup: 1971
- Maghreb Cup of Champions Clubs: 1975, 1976
