= 1977 Merdeka Tournament =

International football competition

Tournament details
- Host country: Malaysia
- Teams: 7 (from 1 confederation)
- Venue: 1 (in 1 host city)

Final positions
- Champions: South Korea (1st title)
- Runners-up: Iraq

Tournament statistics
- Matches played: 14

The 1977 Merdeka Tournament was held from 16 July to 31 July 1977 in Malaysia.

== Matches ==
Pos	Team	Pld	W	D	L	GF	GA	GD	Pts	
1	South Korea	6	4	2	0	19	4	+15	10	Final
2	Iraq	6	3	3	0	11	1	+10	9	Final
3	Malaysia	6	3	3	0	11	3	+8	9	
4	Libya	6	1	3	2	8	10	−2	5	
5	Burma	6	1	2	3	5	11	−6	4	
6	Thailand	6	1	2	3	5	15	−10	4	
7	Indonesia	6	0	1	5	3	18	−15	1	

Updated to match(es) played on unknown. Source:
16 July 1977

Malaysia	1–0	Burma
	Report

Merdeka Stadium, Kuala Lumpur

17 July 1977

Iraq	2–0	Indonesia
Saeed 8'; Abdul-Zahra 47'	Report

Merdeka Stadium, Kuala Lumpur
17 July 1977

South Korea	4–0	Libya
	Report

Merdeka Stadium, Kuala Lumpur

18 July 1977

Malaysia	3–0	Thailand
	Report

Merdeka Stadium, Kuala Lumpur

19 July 1977

Burma	1–1	Indonesia
Tin Win 44'	Report	Yopi Soununu 38'

Merdeka Stadium, Kuala Lumpur
19 July 1977

Iraq	0–0	Libya
	Report

Merdeka Stadium, Kuala Lumpur

20 July 1977

South Korea	4–1	Thailand
	Report

Merdeka Stadium, Kuala Lumpur

21 July 1977

Iraq	3–0	Burma
Alwan 39', 72', 88'	Report

Merdeka Stadium, Kuala Lumpur
21 July 1977

Malaysia	1–1	Libya
	Report

Merdeka Stadium, Kuala Lumpur

22 July 1977

South Korea	5–1	Indonesia
	Report

Merdeka Stadium, Kuala Lumpur

23 July 1977

Libya	2–2	Thailand
	Report

Merdeka Stadium, Kuala Lumpur
23 July 1977

Malaysia	0–0	Iraq
	Report

Merdeka Stadium, Kuala Lumpur

24 July 1977

South Korea	4–0	Burma
	Report

Merdeka Stadium, Kuala Lumpur

25 July 1977

Iraq	5–0	Thailand
Saeed 6'; Alwan 30', 59'; Tingsapat 84' (o.g.); Tantadilok 87' (o.g.)	Report

Merdeka Stadium, Kuala Lumpur
25 July 1977

Libya	4–0	Indonesia
	Report

Merdeka Stadium, Kuala Lumpur

26 July 1977

South Korea	1–1	Malaysia
	Report

Merdeka Stadium, Kuala Lumpur

27 July 1977

Indonesia	0–1	Thailand
	Report

Merdeka Stadium, Kuala Lumpur
27 July 1977

Burma	3–1	Libya
Tin Win 14', 41'; Sein Win Lay 29'	Report	Mohamed Gihani 58'

Merdeka Stadium, Kuala Lumpur

28 July 1977

Iraq	1–1	South Korea
Saeed 63'	Report	Jae-Han 36'

Merdeka Stadium, Kuala Lumpur

29 July 1977

Burma	1–1	Thailand
Kyi Lwin 89'	Report	Somporn Janyavisut 40'

Merdeka Stadium, Kuala Lumpur
29 July 1977

Malaysia	5–1	Indonesia
	Report

Merdeka Stadium, Kuala Lumpur

=== Final ===
31 July 1977

South Korea	1–0	Iraq
Bum-kun 61'	Report

Merdeka Stadium, Kuala Lumpur
