= Ali Kadhim =

Iraqi footballer

Personal information
- Full name: Ali Kadhim Nassir Al-Tameemi
- Date of birth: 1 January 1949
- Place of birth: Kingdom of Iraq
- Date of death: 2 January 2018 (aged 69)
- Place of death: Baghdad, Iraq
- Position: Forward

Senior career*
Years	Team	Apps	(Gls)
1968–1975	Al-Naqil		
1975–1982	Al-Zawraa		
1978	→ Al-Shorta (loan)		

International career
1970–1980	Iraq	84	(36)

Managerial career
- 1991: Al-Zawraa
- * Club domestic league appearances and goals

Ali Kadhim Nassir Al-Tameemi (Arabic: عَلِيّ كَاظِم نَاصِر التَّمِيمِيّ), 1 January 1949 – 2 January 2018) was an Iraqi football striker who played for Iraq in the 1972 AFC Asian Cup & 1976 AFC Asian Cup. He also played for Al Zawraa. He held Iraq's goal record with 36 goals in his time, until Hussein Saeed broke it in 1982. He's the uncle of Iraqi international footballer Ali Adnan Kadhim.

After a long illness, Kadhim died right after his 69th birthday.

== Career statistics ==
=== International goals ===
Scores and results list Iraq's goal tally first.

No	Date	Venue	Opponent	Score	Result	Competition
1.	28 January 1971	Al-Shaab Stadium, Baghdad	Kuwait	2–0	2–0	Friendly
2.	13 December 1971	Kuwait National Stadium, Kuwait City	Ceylon	1–0	5–0	1972 AFC Asian Cup qualification
3.	13 December 1971	Kuwait National Stadium, Kuwait City	Ceylon	2–0	5–0	1972 AFC Asian Cup qualification
4.	13 December 1971	Kuwait National Stadium, Kuwait City	Ceylon	4–0	5–0	1972 AFC Asian Cup qualification
5.	15 December 1971	Kuwait National Stadium, Kuwait City	Bahrain	1–0	1–0	1972 AFC Asian Cup qualification
6.	18 December 1971	Kuwait National Stadium, Kuwait City	Jordan	2–0	2–0	1972 AFC Asian Cup qualification
7.	22 December 1971	Kuwait National Stadium, Kuwait City	Lebanon	1–0	4–1	1972 AFC Asian Cup qualification
8.	22 December 1971	Kuwait National Stadium, Kuwait City	Lebanon	2–0	4–1	1972 AFC Asian Cup qualification
9.	5 January 1972	Al-Shaab Stadium, Baghdad	Libya	1–0	3–0	1972 Palestine Cup
10.	5 January 1972	Al-Shaab Stadium, Baghdad	Libya	2–0	3–0	1972 Palestine Cup
11.	7 January 1972	Al-Shaab Stadium, Baghdad	Kuwait	2–1	3–1	1972 Palestine Cup
12.	12 January 1972	Al-Shaab Stadium, Baghdad	Algeria	2–0	3–1	1972 Palestine Cup
13.	16 March 1973	Sydney Sports Ground, Sydney	Indonesia	1–0	1–1	1974 FIFA World Cup qualification
14.	24 March 1973	Sydney Sports Ground, Sydney	New Zealand	3–0	4–0	1974 FIFA World Cup qualification
15.	14 August 1974	Al-Shaab Stadium, Baghdad	Bahrain	4–0	4–0	Friendly
16.	3 September 1974	Amjadieh Stadium, Tehran	India	3–0	3–0	1974 Asian Games
17.	9 January 1975	Al-Shaab Stadium, Baghdad	Libya	1–0	3–1	Friendly
18.	9 January 1975	Al-Shaab Stadium, Baghdad	Libya	3–1	3–1	Friendly
19.	20 August 1975	Aryamehr Stadium, Tehran	Kuwait	1–0	2–1	1976 Olympics qualifiers
20.	20 August 1975	Aryamehr Stadium, Tehran	Kuwait	2–1	2–1	1976 Olympics qualifiers
21.	26 August 1975	Aryamehr Stadium, Tehran	Bahrain	1–0	4–0	1976 Olympics qualifiers
22.	26 August 1975	Aryamehr Stadium, Tehran	Bahrain	2–0	4–0	1976 Olympics qualifiers
23.	26 August 1975	Aryamehr Stadium, Tehran	Bahrain	3–0	4–0	1976 Olympics qualifiers
24.	26 August 1975	Aryamehr Stadium, Tehran	Bahrain	4–0	4–0	1976 Olympics qualifiers
25.	23 November 1975	Al-Shaab Stadium, Baghdad	Afghanistan	3–1	3–1	1976 AFC Asian Cup qualification
26.	26 December 1975	Stade El Menzah, Tunis	Syria	1–0	4–0	1975 Palestine Cup
27.	26 December 1975	Stade El Menzah, Tunis	Syria	2–0	4–0	1975 Palestine Cup
28.	27 March 1976	Grand Hamad Stadium, Doha	Oman	2–0	4–0	4th Arabian Gulf Cup
29.	27 March 1976	Grand Hamad Stadium, Doha	Oman	4–0	4–0	4th Arabian Gulf Cup
30.	29 March 1976	Grand Hamad Stadium, Doha	Bahrain	4–1	4–1	4th Arabian Gulf Cup
31.	1 April 1976	Grand Hamad Stadium, Doha	Saudi Arabia	4–1	7–1	4th Arabian Gulf Cup
32.	1 April 1976	Grand Hamad Stadium, Doha	Saudi Arabia	5–1	7–1	4th Arabian Gulf Cup
33.	1 April 1976	Grand Hamad Stadium, Doha	Saudi Arabia	6–1	7–1	4th Arabian Gulf Cup
34.	6 April 1976	Grand Hamad Stadium, Doha	United Arab Emirates	2–0	4–0	4th Arabian Gulf Cup
35.	8 April 1976	Grand Hamad Stadium, Doha	Kuwait	2–0	2–2	4th Arabian Gulf Cup
36.	27 November 1977	Al-Shaab Stadium, Baghdad	Morocco	1–0	3–0	Friendly
