= Hassani Alwan =

Iraqi association football player

Personal information
- Full name: Hussein Alwan
- Date of birth: 1 January 1955 (age 71)
- Place of birth: Iraq
- Position: Midfielder

Senior career*
Years	Team	Apps	(Gls)
- Al Zawraa
- Al-Quwa Al-Jawiya

International career
1975–1976	Iraq		
- * Club domestic league appearances and goals

Hussein "Hassani" Alwan (Arabic: حُسَيْن "حَسَّانِيّ" عَلْوَان; born 1 January 1955) is a former Iraqi football midfielder who played for Iraq in the 1976 AFC Asian Cup. He played for the national team between 1975 and 1976.
