= Riyadh Nouri =

Iraqi association football player

Personal information
- Full name: Riyadh Nouri Fathi
- Date of birth: 1 July 1951 (age 75)
- Place of birth: Iraq
- Position: Midfielder

Senior career*
Years	Team	Apps	(Gls)
- Al-Shorta

International career
1970–1977	Iraq		
- * Club domestic league appearances and goals

Riyadh Nouri (born 1 July 1951) is a former Iraqi football midfielder who played for Iraq in the 1972 AFC Asian Cup and 1974 FIFA World Cup qualification. He played for the national team between 1970 and 1977.

On 11 March 1973, Riyadh scored Iraq's first ever World Cup qualification goal against Australia.

== Career statistics ==
=== International goals ===
Scores and results list Iraq's goal tally first.

No	Date	Venue	Opponent	Score	Result	Competition
1.	24 December 1971	National Stadium, Kuwait City	Kuwait	1–0	1–0	1972 AFC Asian Cup qualification
2.	11 March 1973	Sydney Sports Ground, Sydney	Australia	1–3	1–3	1974 FIFA World Cup qualification
3.	21 March 1973	Sydney Sports Ground, Sydney	Indonesia	3–2	3–2	1974 FIFA World Cup qualification
