= Mudhafar Nouri =

Iraqi association football player

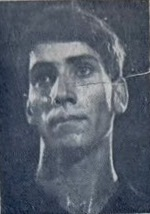

Personal information
- Full name: Mudhafar Nouri Fathi
- Date of birth: 1 July 1948
- Place of birth: Iraq
- Date of death: 4 July 2007 (aged 59)
- Place of death: Baghdad, Iraq
- Position: Forward

International career
Years	Team	Apps	(Gls)
1967–1971	Iraq		

Managerial career
- 1992–1993: Al-Shorta
- 1996: Al-Shorta

Mudhafar Nouri Fathi (1 July 1948 – 4 July 2007) was an Iraqi football forward who played for Iraq between 1967 and 1971.

Nouri died on 4 July 2007.

== Career statistics ==
=== International goals ===
Scores and results list Iraq's goal tally first.

No	Date	Venue	Opponent	Score	Result	Competition
7.	16 January 1968	Supachalasai Stadium, Bangkok	Thailand	4–0	4–0	1968 Olympics qualifiers
