= Mahdi Abdul-Sahib =

Iraqi footballer (born 1956)

Personal information
- Full name: Mahdi Abdul-Sahib Hassoun
- Date of birth: 28 July 1956 (age 70)
- Place of birth: Iraq
- Position: Forward

Senior career*
Years	Team	Apps	(Gls)
1976-1980	Al-Talaba SC		
1980-1984	Al-Jaish SC		
1984-1985	Al-Quwa Al-Jawiya		
1985-1988	Al-Talaba SC		

International career
1978–1984	Iraq		
- * Club domestic league appearances and goals

Mahdi Abdul-Sahib (born 28 July 1956) is an Iraqi former footballer who played as a forward. He represented the Iraq national team at the 1978 Asian Games and 1982 Asian Games.

Mahdi played for Iraq between 1978 and 1981.

== Career statistics ==
Scores and results list Iraq's goal tally first, score column indicates score after each Abdul-Sahib goal.

List of international goals scored by Mahdi Abdul-Sahib
No.	Date	Venue	Opponent	Score	Result	Competition
1	18 December 1978	Rajamangala Stadium, Bangkok, Thailand	Kuwait	3–0	3–0	1978 Asian Games
