= Sabah Hatim =

Iraqi footballer

Personal information
- Full name: Sabah Hatim
- Date of birth: 1 July 1950 (age 76)
- Place of birth: Iraq
- Position: Forward

Senior career*
Years	Team	Apps	(Gls)
- Al-Shorta

International career
1971–1975	Iraq		
- * Club domestic league appearances and goals

Sabah Hatim (Arabic: صَبَّاح حَاتِم; born 1 July 1950) is a former Iraqi football forward who played for Iraq in the 1972 AFC Asian Cup. He played for Iraq between 1971 and 1975.

He was part of the team that played their first World Cup qualifiers in 1974, and even scored an hattrick against New Zealand.

== Career statistics ==
=== International goals ===
Scores and results list Iraq's goal tally first.

No	Date	Venue	Opponent	Score	Result	Competition
1.	12 November 1971	Al-Shaab Stadium, Baghdad	North Korea	1–0	1–0	1972 Olympics qualifiers
2.	7 January 1972	Al-Shaab Stadium, Baghdad	Kuwait	3–1	3–1	1972 Palestine Cup of Nations
3.	13 March 1973	Sydney Sports Ground, Sydney	New Zealand	2–0	2–0	1974 FIFA World Cup qualification
4.	21 March 1973	Sydney Sports Ground, Sydney	Indonesia	3–2	3–2	1974 FIFA World Cup qualification
5.	24 March 1973	Sydney Sports Ground, Sydney	New Zealand	1–0	4–0	1974 FIFA World Cup qualification
6.	24 March 1973	Sydney Sports Ground, Sydney	New Zealand	2–0	4–0	1974 FIFA World Cup qualification
7.	24 March 1973	Sydney Sports Ground, Sydney	New Zealand	4–0	4–0	1974 FIFA World Cup qualification
8.	6 September 1974	Amjadieh Stadium, Tehran	China	1–0	1–0	1974 Asian Games
