= Hussein Saeed =

Iraqi footballer (born 1958)

- حُسَيْن سَعِيد مُحَمَّد
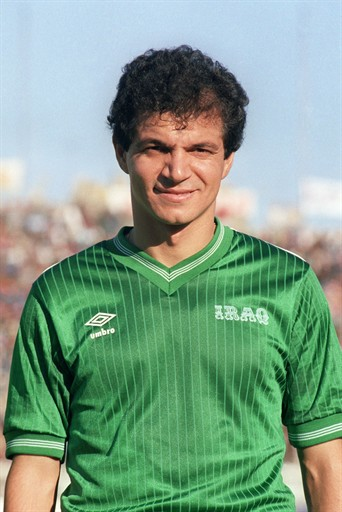

16th President of the IFA
- In office 27 June 2004 – 13 June 2011
- Preceded by: Uday Hussein
- Succeeded by: Najeh Humoud

Personal details
- Born: Hussein Saeed Mohammed; 21 January 1958 (age 68) Al Adhamiya, Bagdad, Iraq
- Height: 1.80 m (5 ft 11 in)
- Occupation: Footballer; Manager; Football administrator
Association football career
- Position: Forward
Senior career*
Years	Team	Apps	(Gls)
1975–1990	Al-Talaba	300	(122)
International career
1975–1977	Iraq U20	12	(18)
1976–1990	Iraq	137	(78)
Managerial career
- 1993: Al-Talaba
Medal record
Men's football
Representing Iraq
Arabian Gulf Cup
Winner	1979 Iraq
Winner	1984 Oman
Asian Games
Gold medal – first place	1982 New Delhi	Team
AFC U-19 Championship
Winner	1977 Iran
- * Club domestic league appearances and goals

Hussein Saeed Mohammed (Arabic: حُسَيْن سَعِيد مُحَمَّد, born 21 January 1958) is an Iraqi former footballer who played as a forward and is a former president of the Iraq Football Association. Saeed is in thirteenth place in the list of top international goal scorers, with 78 goals. Along with Ahmed Radhi, he is considered to be the best Iraqi player of the 20th century and features in 25th place in Asia's Best Players of the Century list. Hussein's 78 international goals make him currently the Iraqi national team's highest scoring player.

Saeed started his professional football career at the age of 17, when he joined the Iraq national varsity football team and won the 1975 Arab Schools Games gold medal. In 1975, he joined Al-Jamiea, who later became known as Al-Talaba, where he spent all 15 years of his career, achieving three league titles and getting the top goalscorer of the league award in three seasons. He won two AFC U-19 Championships, two Arabian Gulf Cups, where he was the top goalscorer of both occasions and the best player of one, a World Military Cup, and an Asian Games gold medal.

== Early life ==
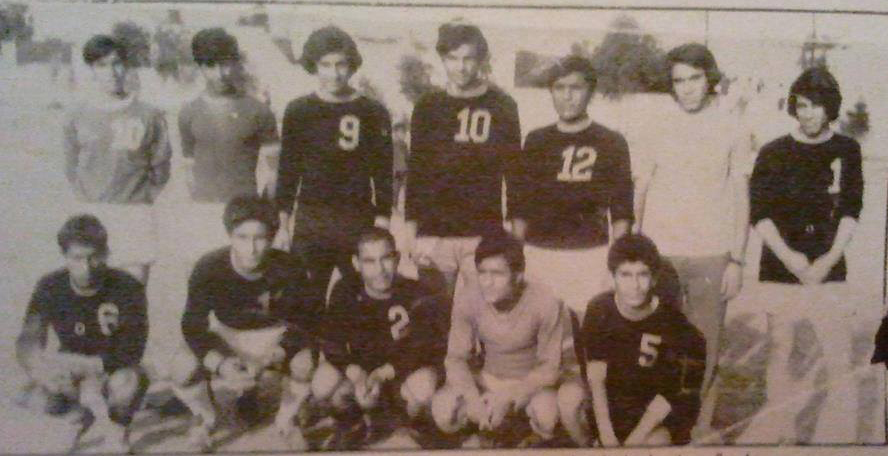
Saeed (the middle from standing) wearing the number 10 with Al-Iskan Youth Center in 1972

Hussein Saeed was born on 21 January 1958 in Al Adhamiya, where most of the Al-Ubaid tribe lived, to a conservative Baghdadi family. The family moved from Al Adhamiya to live in Al-Iskan when his father, who had previously worked as a fabrics merchant, got a job in the Ministry of Construction and Housing.

Hussein Saeed started playing football in the streets before joining Al-Iskan's youth center. He led them to an Iraq Youth Centers' Championship, scoring a hat-trick in a 4–2 win against Al-Zawra'a youth team and catching the eye of Dawoud Al-Azzawi, the manager of the Iraq national under-17 football team and Iraq national varsity football team. Al-Azzawi called him up to the varsity team and, in his first competitive tournament with the team, he won the gold medal in the 1975 Arab Schools Games in Egypt.

== Club career ==
Saeed joined Al-Jamiea when he was 17 years old in 1975 with an invitation from the manager Jamal Salih who lived in Saeed's neighborhood. His first match for Al-Jamiea was in the 1975–76 Iraq FA Cup against Al-Shorta, which Al-Jamiea won 3–0. He scored his first league goal with the club against Al-Hilla in a 1–1 draw. The club eventually finished in 8th place. They came very close to achieve the league in the 1976–77 season but they settled in 2nd place in the league table behind Al-Zawra'a. In the 1977–78 season, Saeed scored two goals with his team finishing in 8th place.

Al-Jamiea became known as Al-Talaba SC ahead of the 1978–79 season after merging with a new club of the same name, which saw Saeed reach the top three goalscorers of the league for the first time, netting six goals for Al-Talaba which made him the second top goalscorer behind Falah Hassan with only one goal and along with his teammate, Haris Mohammed, in 3rd. Al-Talaba finished in 3rd place in the table at 15 points. The season after, in 1979–80, Al-Talaba finished in 3rd place at 27 points in the league and reached the final of the 1979–80 Iraq FA Cup where they came up against Al-Jaish and lost on penalties 4–2 after a 1–1 draw.

In the 1980–81 season, Al-Talaba won their first ever league title after tying with Al-Shorta on both points and goal difference in the end where the Iraq Football Association declared Al-Talaba as champions due to them having more wins than Al-Shorta. Hussein Saeed was the top goalscorer of the league with 11 goals in 11 matches out of Al-Talaba's total 19 goals. In the cup, Al-Talaba reached the final for the second time in the row and came up against Al-Zawra'a and lost again in the final 1–0. In the 1981–82 season, Al-Talaba retained their league title, sitting in 1st at 34 points with Saeed being the second top goalscorer of the league with 11 goals, along with Al-Amana's Ghazi Hashim and behind Al-Zawra'a's Thamer Yousif. They reached the cup final for the third time in the row and lost to Al-Zawra'a again 2–1. The next season, Saeed continued his battle for the top goalscorer in which he scored 17 goals surpassing his teammate, Rahim Hameed, with 8 goals. Al-Talaba finished in 2nd place with one point away from the champions, Salahaddin.

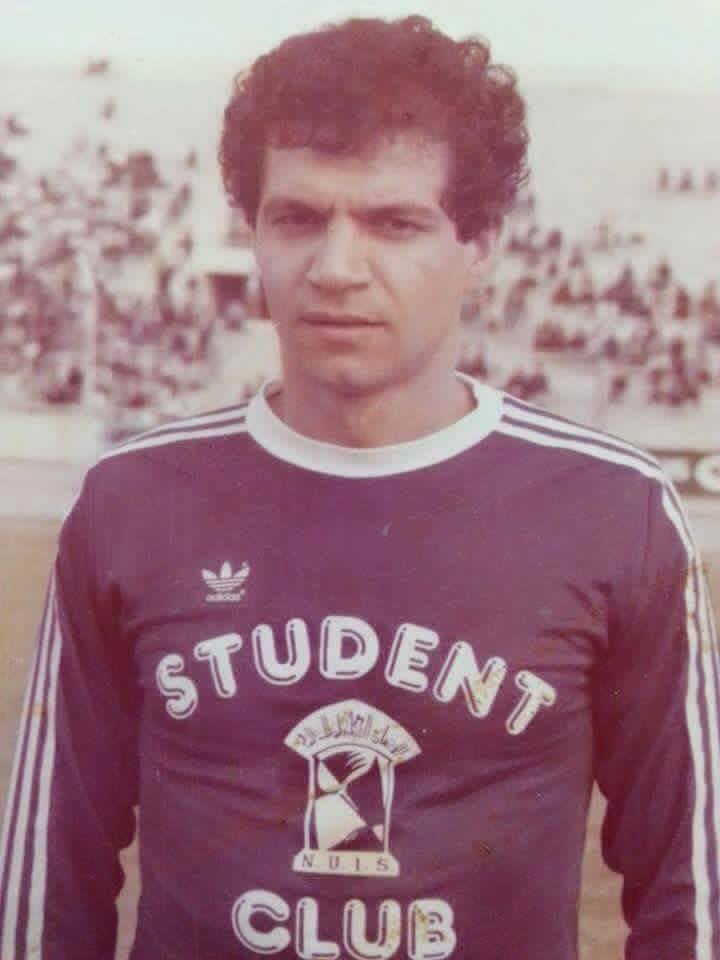
Saeed in a match against Al-Rasheed in 1984–85

In the 1983–84 season, Saeed came in third in the goalscorers table with 7 goals behind Al-Jaish's Rahim Hameed and Ali Hussein Mahmoud. Al-Talaba finished as the runners-up for the third time in their history at 36 points behind Al-Jaish. The season after, before the league was abandoned, Saeed scored 14 goals out of his team's 20 goals and was the top goalscorers of the league. The club finished in 5th place at 15 points and reached the quarterfinal of the Al-Rasheed Cup.

The 1985–86 season was one of Al-Talaba and Saeed's best season in their history where Al-Talaba achieved their third league title after beating their rivals at the time, Al-Rasheed, in front of 50,000 spectators, with Saeed's only goal from a penalty, finishing in 1st with 25 points from 15 matches. Saeed finished the season as the top goalscorer of the league along with Al-Zawra'a's Ahmed Radhi and Al-Jaish's Rahim Hameed where, for the first time, every one of them scored 9 goals in the league. As of that season, Saeed was also made the club's vice president. In the 1986 Saddam International Tournament, Saeed played for Baghdad XI, rather than Al-Talaba, because Baghdad XI was essentially the Iraq national team under a different name. Baghdad XI won all of their group matches including a victory over Saeed's club Al-Talaba to qualify for the semi-finals where they thrashed Al-Zawra'a to reach the final. However, Baghdad XI lost the final 2–1 to Al-Rasheed; Saeed scored Baghdad XI's only goal in the final in the 78th minute with a penalty. Saeed returned to Al-Talaba for the 1986 Iraqi Perseverance Cup between Al-Talaba and Al-Rasheed; Al-Rasheed won the match 2–1. In the 1986–87 season, Al-Talaba finished mid-table in 6th place at 49 points. The second half of the season witnessed the retirement of the team captain, Jamal Ali, in 1987, when Saeed was named the new captain of the team, although he only participated in the first stage of the league due to an association punishment against him. The 1987–88 season was the only season where Saeed hasn't scored any goals due to him not participating in many matches because of national duty. They finished, for the first time since 1977–78, in 8th place at 30 points. Saeed wasted Al-Talaba's hope in achieving the league title in 1988–89 when he missed his penalty in the final of the league against their rivals, Al-Rasheed, after a 1–1 draw. The score was 4–3 to Al-Talaba but with Saeed's miss they got the equalizer and with his teammate missing the fifth penalty, Al-Rasheed won 5–4. Saeed returned to the top three goalscorers of the league table in 3rd with 12 goals along with Al-Zawra'a's Saad Abdul-Raheem.

The last season that Saeed played in was the 1989–90 season where he led his team through the first stage at 1st place until the 18th round on 19 January 1990 where he played his last match and scored his last goal with the club, against Al-Zawra'a, before the Iraq Football Association called him up in the last days for the 10th Arabian Gulf Cup and after he scored 10 goals for his team. This call-up made his team drop to 6th place after being the league leaders. After finishing the Gulf Cup, he announced his retirement. In the total 15 season that Saeed has played for Al-Talaba he scored 122 goals and was the top goalscorer of the team for 10 seasons. Although he retired, Saeed stayed as the vice president of Al-Talaba until 1992.

== International career ==
Saeed was called up from the Iraq national under-17 football team to the reserves team of the Iraq national under-20 football team, where he first participated in the 1975 AFC Youth Championship, in which Iraq shared the title with Iran after they had a goalless match in the final. In the 1976 edition, Saeed was called up by the team's new manager, Miodgard Stankovic, to be part of the first eleven, scoring four goals in Iraq's opening match, against Sri Lanka, and becoming the top goalscorer of the tournament with 7 goals. Iraq was knocked out in the quarterfinal, against North Korea.

After the 4th Arabian Gulf Cup the managerial staff was changed and the Iraq Football Association assigned the Croatian manager, Lenko Grčić, as the new manager of the Iraq national football team, Saeed was called up to the national team, for the first time in his career, at the age of 18. He made his debut on 5 September 1976 in a friendly match against Saudi Arabia where they drew 0–0. He continued to play in the youth team because the manager, Miodgard Stankovic, was Yugoslavian, reaching an understanding with Grčić. Iraq achieved the 1977 AFC Youth Championship where Saeed scored the winning goal in the final, from a diving header in the 90th minute, against Iran in a 4–3 victory in Tehran. Saeed was also the top goalscorer of this edition with 9 goals, scoring his first national hat-trick against Afghanistan in Iraq's 5–1 win. The same team represented Iraq in the first edition of the FIFA World Youth Championship in 1977 where they lost 3–1 to the Soviet Union, won 5–1 over Austria with Saeed scoring a hat-trick, and lost 4–0 to Paraguay which knocked them out of the competition.

Saeed's first competition with the senior national team was the 1977 Merdeka Cup in Kuala Lumpur. He started in Iraq's opening match, against Indonesia, on 17 July 1977, and scored his first goal with Iraq after only 8 minutes from kickoff, scored a goal in Iraq's 5–0 win over Thailand after 6 minutes, and scored Iraq's only goal in their 1–1 draw against South Korea. Iraq finished in 2nd place in the table behind South Korea, meeting them again in the final where Iraq lost 1–0. Saeed played all the 630 minutes of Iraq's 7 matches.

On 21 February 1978, Saeed scored his first hat-trick with the senior national team in a friendly match against Algeria at the Al-Shaab Stadium. His second competition was the 1978 edition of the Merdeka Cup where he scored a single hat-trick against Singapore. Iraq finished in 2nd place behind South Korea again, leading to the second Merdeka Cup final between the two teams where Iraq lost 2–0.

In the 1978 Asian Games, He scored a goal in Iraq's 2–0 win over China in the preliminary group stage. In the semifinal group stage, He scored in Iraq's 3–0 win over Kuwait and another goal in Iraq's 3–0 win against India. Iraq lost in the bronze medal game with China by a single goal. Saeed was also part of the Iraq military national football team that won the 1979 CISM World Military Championship in Kuwait City. He scored a goal against Austria in a 4–0 win and scored a goal in Iraq's 5–0 win over Bahrain in the group stage. He scored for Iraq's semifinal match with Kuwait for a 2–0 win. He scored Iraq's first kick in the penalty shootout, in the final, against Italy after a 0–0 draw. Iraq won 4–3 on penalties and achieved the military cup. Saeed's first appearance in the Arabian Gulf Cup was in the 1979 edition in Baghdad under the management of Ammo Baba. In Iraq's opening match, against Bahrain, he scored a hat-trick. He also scored Iraq's two goals in their win over Qatar, scored a goal in Iraq's huge 5–0 win against the UAE, and scored a super hat-trick in the 7–0 victory over Oman. Iraq achieved the cup after finishing in 1st place at 12 points, breaking Kuwait's streak since the 1970 edition. Saeed also became the top goalscorer of the tournament with 10 goals, making him the all-time top goalscorer of the Arabian Gulf Cup.

Saeed started in Iraq's five matches of the 1980 Summer Olympics qualifiers played in Baghdad in which a goal against Jordan and two more against South Yemen. Iraq drew in points with Kuwait in the Asian Qualifying Tournament Group 1 which led to a playoff match that Iraq lost 3–2. However, Iraq got qualified by replacing Malaysia. In the 1980 Summer Olympics in the USSR, Saeed scored a single goal against Costa Rica. Iraq reached the quarterfinal and was beaten by East Germany in a 4–0 loss.

Saeed participated in the 6th Arabian Gulf Cup in Abu Dhabi in 1982, scoring a total of five goals in the tournament: one against Oman, two against Bahrain, one against Saudi Arabia, and a last one against the UAE. Although Iraq finished 1st in the table, they withdrew from the competition by an order from Former President Saddam Hussein to motivate Kuwait who qualified to the 1982 FIFA World Cup by letting them win which led to scratching all of Iraq's results from the competition. In the same year, Saeed led Iraq to win their first ever gold medal in the Asian Games in the 1982 Asian Games, under the management of Ammo Baba, in New Delhi. In Iraq's opening match, Saeed scored a goal in an easy 4–0 win over Burma. He also scored two goals in Iraq's 3–0 win against Nepal. In the quarterfinal, Iraq won over Japan with a single goal in extra time from Emad Jassim and, in the semifinal, they defeated Saudi Arabia with one goal. On 3 December, the final match was played between Iraq and Kuwait, where Saeed gained Iraq's gold medal when he scored the winning goal in the 82nd minute of the match with a through pass from Karim Mohammed Allawi.

Iraq achieved their second Arabian Gulf Cup in the 1984 edition in Muscat, with Ammo Baba as the team's manager. Saeed scored the two Iraqi goals in Iraq's opening match in a 2–1 victory, scored a hat-trick in Iraq's 4–0 win over Saudi Arabia, and also scored two goals in Iraq's fifth match against Kuwait in a 3–1 win. Iraq were a match away from winning the cup but, unfortunately, Iraq lost against Qatar in a 1–2 defeat. Iraq and Qatar had an equal number of points which led them to having a final decisive match. On 28 March, a final match between them was played. The two teams drew in the whole 90 minutes of the game. In extra time, Iraq scored a goal and Qatar leveled, taking the match to penalties where Iraq defeated Qatar 4–3. Saeed was the top goalscorer of the tournament with 7 goals and had received the Best Player of the Tournament award along with Oman's Ghulam Khamis.

Saeed appeared in all of the nine 1984 Summer Olympics qualification match that was played by Iraq, scoring a goal against Bahrain in Iraq's 2–1 win in Manama and another one against Malaysia in Iraq's 2–0 win in Singapore. Iraq was qualified for the second time in the row to the Summer Olympics where Saeed scored Iraq's only goal in the opening match, against Canada, in the 83rd minute of a 1–1 draw. He also scored a goal in Iraq's defeat against Yugoslavia 4–2. Iraq were knocked out of the competition after drawing a game and losing the other two.

Saeed captained Iraq through the 1986 FIFA World Cup qualifiers in 1985, playing 8 matches and scoring 8 goals including four against Lebanon in two 6–0 wins for Iraq, a winning goal against Jordan in Iraq's 3–2 win, which was Saeed's 100th appearance with the senior national team. Iraq finished in the top of the Group 1B table at 6 points in the first round, getting qualified to the 1986 FIFA World Cup qualification – AFC second round. Saeed scored two goals in Iraq's 3–2 away win over the UAE. They lost 2–1 in their home match which qualified them to the final round on away goals. Saeed also scored in Iraq's victorious match against Syria in Taif in which Iraq won 3–1 getting qualified for the first time of their history to the FIFA World Cup after ending their away match in a 0–0 draw. When the 1986 FIFA World Cup was about to start, there were some speculations about Saeed not being in Iraq's squad, due to his injury, but he joined the team in the last moments. On 4 June, Saeed played in Iraq's first match against Paraguay, where they were defeated by a single goal. After the match, Iraq's head coach, Evaristo de Macedo, removed Saeed from the squad, due to his prior injury, and returned him to Baghdad. Iraq lost their two other matches against Belgium and Mexico, getting knocked out from the group stage of the cup. That was the last time Iraq was qualified for the World Cup until 2026.

After their disappointing run in the World Cup, Saeed rejoined the team in the 1986 Asian Games where he scored a goal against Oman in Iraq's opening match which ended 4–0 and another one against the UAE in the 2–1 defeat. He missed the Iraq's 5–1 win over Pakistan and the quarterfinal with Saudi Arabia which ended in a 1–1 draw, leading the match to penalties where Iraq lost 9–8. Saeed appeared in all of Iraq's matches in the 1988 Summer Olympics qualifiers and scored four goals: three against Jordan and one against Qatar, getting qualified to the Summer Olympics for the third time in the row where they were knocked out again from the group stage after finishing 3rd in the Group B table. 1988 was the first year where Saeed didn't score any goal since his debut year in 1976.

After not appearing in either the 1986 or the 1988 Arabian Gulf Cups, Saeed played in the 1988 President's Cup Football Tournament where he scored three goals; Iraq were knocked out in the quarterfinals. Saeed returned to the Gulf Cup in the 10th Arabian Gulf Cup in Kuwait in 1990. Iraq won their first game against Bahrain 1–0 and drew their second game with Kuwait 1–1. They drew again in their third match against the UAE 2–2 draw. Iraq withdrew from the tournament after the game with the UAE, because of the refereeing, which was Saeed's last match in his football career before he decided to retire at the age of 32 in the same year.

== Managerial career ==
=== Al-Talaba (1993) ===
After he left the office of vice president of Al-Talaba in 1992, the club finished the 1992–93 as winners of the league and the 2nd Umm al-Ma'arik Championship and the runners-up of the 1992–93 Iraq FA Cup. Before the start of the 1993–94 season, the team's manager, Ayoub Odisho, resigned which made the board look for a new manager to settle quickly which ended in assigning Saeed as the interim manager of the club. He coached the team through the first half of the league of 25 matches before re-signing Odisho. Saeed's last match as the manager ended in a 4–0 loss to the league leaders, Al-Zawra'a. He also led Al-Talaba to achieve the 3rd Umm al-Ma'arik Championship, which was held in September 1993, after defeating Al-Quwa Al-Jawiya in the final 2–1, achieving his first and only trophy as a manager.

== Administrative roles ==
As of 16 July 2013

Took office	Office	Left office	Notes
1985	Vice President of Al-Talaba	1992	(Note: Took the office while he was a player.)
1990	Member of the Iraq Football Association	2003	
–	Director of the Iraqi Olympic Committee Office of Foreign Relations	–	
–	Vice President of the Iraq Football Association	–	
–	Secretary of the Iraq Football Association	–	
1996	Member of the Asian Football Confederation Executive Committee	1998	
2000	Member of the Arab League Council of Youth and Sport Ministers Sports Committee	2003	
2002	Member of the Asian Football Confederation Executive Committee	2009	
2002	Member of the Asian Football Confederation Fair Play Committee	2009	
2002	Member of the Fédération Internationale de Football Association Media Committee	2011	
27 June 2004	President of the Iraq Football Association	13 June 2011	(Note: Resigned from office.)
2005	Member of the Union of Arab Football Associations Executive Committee	2009	
29 April 2010	Vice President of the Union of Arab Football Associations	16 July 2013	

=== Controversies ===
As Saeed was the vice president of the Iraq Football Association, which was headed by Uday Hussein, in the 1990s, there were many controversies about him being a Ba'athist and a Saddamist. He was also accused of being of a Palestinian descent, torturing players, and giving positions to Tikritis. Accusations also went to say that Saeed was Uday's representative in robbing Kuwaitis in the 1991 Gulf War. Documents were put on the internet by some news agencies that suggest that Saeed, Najeh Humoud and Moayad Al-Badri worked for the Iraqi Intelligence Service in 2002 by gathering information on their targets. The documents included Saeed gathering information about Al-Badri when he was staying in Saudi Arabia before joining them himself. They also show the approval of the Personal Secretary of Former President Saddam Hussein, Abid Hamid Mahmud, of paying Saeed $50,000 after completing his mission and him signing on receiving $25,000. One of the documents showed him and Al-Badri executing a mission to monitor an alleged Israeli spy in Syria and showed him arresting Yahya Alwan before travelling to Saudi Arabia.

== Career statistics ==
=== International ===
Team	Year	Tournament		Friendly		Total	
Team	Year	Apps	Goals	Apps	Goals	Apps	Goals
Iraq U-20	1976	4	6	—		4	6
Iraq U-20	1977	8	12	—		8	12
Iraq U-20	Total	12	18	—		12	18
Iraq Military	1979	4	3	2	2	6	5
Iraq Military	Total	4	3	2	2	6	5
Iraq	1976	—		3	0	2	0
Iraq	1977	7	3	1	0	8	3
Iraq	1978	15	6	5	4	20	10
Iraq	1979	6	10	4	3	10	13
Iraq	1980	8	4	3	0	11	4
Iraq	1981	3	1	3	2	6	3
Iraq	1982	11	9	5	3	16	12
Iraq	1983	4	1	1	0	5	1
Iraq	1984	16	12	2	1	18	13
Iraq	1985	8	8	3	1	11	9
Iraq	1986	4	2	4	1	8	3
Iraq	1987	6	4	1	1	7	5
Iraq	1988	4	0	1	0	5	0
Iraq	1989	5	2	—		5	2
Iraq	1990	3	0	1	0	4	0
Iraq	Total	100	62	37	16	137	78
Career total		116	83	39	18	155	101

=== International goals ===
Iraq U-20

As of match played on 4 July 1977 Iraq scores listed first.

#	Date	Venue	Opponent	Result	Competition
1	21 April 1976	National Sports Complex, Bangkok, Thailand	Sri Lanka	5–0	1976 AFC Youth Championship
2	21 April 1976	National Sports Complex, Bangkok, Thailand	Sri Lanka	5–0	1976 AFC Youth Championship
3	21 April 1976	National Sports Complex, Bangkok, Thailand	Sri Lanka	5–0	1976 AFC Youth Championship
4	21 April 1976	National Sports Complex, Bangkok, Thailand	Sri Lanka	5–0	1976 AFC Youth Championship
5	24 April 1976	National Sports Complex, Bangkok, Thailand	Hong Kong	5–0	1976 AFC Youth Championship
6	24 April 1976	National Sports Complex, Bangkok, Thailand	Hong Kong	5–0	1976 AFC Youth Championship
7	17 April 1977	Aryamehr Stadium, Tehran, Iran	India	4–0	1977 AFC Youth Championship
8	17 April 1977	Aryamehr Stadium, Tehran, Iran	India	4–0	1977 AFC Youth Championship
9	19 April 1977	Aryamehr Stadium, Tehran, Iran	Bangladesh	3–0	1977 AFC Youth Championship
10	22 April 1977	Aryamehr Stadium, Tehran, Iran	Afghanistan	5–1	1977 AFC Youth Championship
11	22 April 1977	Aryamehr Stadium, Tehran, Iran	Afghanistan	5–1	1977 AFC Youth Championship
12	22 April 1977	Aryamehr Stadium, Tehran, Iran	Afghanistan	5–1	1977 AFC Youth Championship
13	25 April 1977	Aryamehr Stadium, Tehran, Iran	Bahrain	3–0	1977 AFC Youth Championship
14	28 April 1977	Aryamehr Stadium, Tehran, Iran	Iran	4–3	1977 AFC Youth Championship
15	28 April 1977	Aryamehr Stadium, Tehran, Iran	Iran	4–3	1977 AFC Youth Championship
16	1 July 1977	Sfax Stadium, Sfax, Tunisia	Austria	5–1	1977 FIFA World Youth Championship
17	1 July 1977	Sfax Stadium, Sfax, Tunisia	Austria	5–1	1977 FIFA World Youth Championship
18	1 July 1977	Sfax Stadium, Sfax, Tunisia	Austria	5–1	1977 FIFA World Youth Championship

Iraq Military

As of match played on 14 June 1979 Iraq scores listed first.

#	Date	Venue	Opponent	Result	Competition
1	22 May 1979	Al-Shaab Stadium, Baghdad	Belgium	4–1	Friendly
2	25 May 1979	Al-Shaab Stadium, Baghdad	Belgium	5–1	Friendly
3	4 June 1979	Sabah Al Salem Stadium, Kuwait City	Austria	4–0	1979 CISM World Military Championship
4	6 June 1979	Sabah Al Salem Stadium, Kuwait City	Bahrain	5–0	1979 CISM World Military Championship
5	11 June 1979	Sabah Al Salem Stadium, Kuwait City	Kuwait	2–0	1979 CISM World Military Championship

Iraq

As of match played on 3 March 1990 Iraq scores listed first.
* indicates 27 non-FIFA goals

#	Date	Venue	Opponent	Result	Competition
1	17 July 1977	Stadium Merdeka, Kuala Lumpur	Indonesia	2–0	1977 Merdeka Tournament
2	25 July 1977	Stadium Merdeka, Kuala Lumpur	Thailand	5–0	1977 Merdeka Tournament
3	28 July 1977	Stadium Merdeka, Kuala Lumpur	South Korea	1–1	1977 Merdeka Tournament
4	21 February 1978	Al-Shaab Stadium, Baghdad	Algeria	3–0	Friendly
5	21 February 1978	Al-Shaab Stadium, Baghdad	Algeria	3–0	Friendly
6	21 February 1978	Al-Shaab Stadium, Baghdad	Algeria	3–0	Friendly
7	27 February 1978	Al-Shaab Stadium, Baghdad	North Korea	1–0	Friendly
8	20 July 1978	Stadium Merdeka, Kuala Lumpur	Singapore	3–0	1978 Merdeka Tournament
9	20 July 1978	Stadium Merdeka, Kuala Lumpur	Singapore	3–0	1978 Merdeka Tournament
10	20 July 1978	Stadium Merdeka, Kuala Lumpur	Singapore	3–0	1978 Merdeka Tournament
11	12 December 1978	Bangkok	China	2–0	1978 Asian Games
12	18 December 1978	Bangkok	Kuwait	3–0	1978 Asian Games
13	20 December 1978	Bangkok	India	3–0	1978 Asian Games
14	7 February 1979	Al-Shaab Stadium, Baghdad	Finland	2–0	Friendly
15	9 February 1979	Al-Shaab Stadium, Baghdad	East Germany	1–1	Friendly
16	12 February 1979	Al-Shaab Stadium, Baghdad	East Germany	2–1	Friendly
17	12 February 1979	Al-Shaab Stadium, Baghdad	East Germany	2–1	Friendly
18	23 March 1979	Al-Shaab Stadium, Baghdad	Bahrain	4–0	5th Arabian Gulf Cup
19	23 March 1979	Al-Shaab Stadium, Baghdad	Bahrain	4–0	5th Arabian Gulf Cup
20	23 March 1979	Al-Shaab Stadium, Baghdad	Bahrain	4–0	5th Arabian Gulf Cup
21	26 March 1979	Al-Shaab Stadium, Baghdad	Qatar	2–0	5th Arabian Gulf Cup
22	26 March 1979	Al-Shaab Stadium, Baghdad	Qatar	2–0	5th Arabian Gulf Cup
23	3 April 1979	Al-Shaab Stadium, Baghdad	United Arab Emirates	5–0	5th Arabian Gulf Cup
24	5 April 1979	Al-Shaab Stadium, Baghdad	Oman	7–0	5th Arabian Gulf Cup
25	5 April 1979	Al-Shaab Stadium, Baghdad	Oman	7–0	5th Arabian Gulf Cup
26	5 April 1979	Al-Shaab Stadium, Baghdad	Oman	7–0	5th Arabian Gulf Cup
27	5 April 1979	Al-Shaab Stadium, Baghdad	Oman	7–0	5th Arabian Gulf Cup
28*	16 March 1980	Al-Shaab Stadium, Baghdad	Jordan	4–0	1980 Summer Olympics qualifiers
29*	28 March 1980	Al-Shaab Stadium, Baghdad	South Yemen	3–0	1980 Summer Olympics qualifiers
30*	28 March 1980	Al-Shaab Stadium, Baghdad	South Yemen	3–0	1980 Summer Olympics qualifiers
31*	21 July 1980	Republican Stadium, Kiev	Costa Rica	3–0	1980 Summer Olympics
32	8 February 1981	Amman	Jordan	2–0	Friendly
33	8 March 1981	Fez	Morocco	1–1	Friendly
34	18 March 1981	Riyadh	Qatar	1–0	1982 FIFA World Cup qualifiers
35*	4 March 1982	Al-Shaab Stadium, Baghdad	East Germany	1–1	Friendly
36	7 March 1982	Al-Shaab Stadium, Baghdad	South Korea	3–0	Friendly
37	10 March 1982	Al-Shaab Stadium, Baghdad	South Korea	1–1	Friendly
38*	20 March 1982	Zayed Sports City Stadium, Abu Dhabi	Oman	4–0	6th Arabian Gulf Cup
39*	22 March 1982	Zayed Sports City Stadium, Abu Dhabi	Bahrain	3–0	6th Arabian Gulf Cup
40*	22 March 1982	Zayed Sports City Stadium, Abu Dhabi	Bahrain	3–0	6th Arabian Gulf Cup
41*	24 March 1982	Zayed Sports City Stadium, Abu Dhabi	Saudi Arabia	1–2	6th Arabian Gulf Cup
42*	30 March 1982	Zayed Sports City Stadium, Abu Dhabi	United Arab Emirates	1–0	6th Arabian Gulf Cup
43	21 November 1982	New Delhi	(Myanmar) Burma	4–0	1982 Asian Games
44	23 November 1982	New Delhi	Nepal	3–0	1982 Asian Games
45	23 November 1982	New Delhi	Nepal	3–0	1982 Asian Games
46	3 December 1982	Jawaharlal Nehru Stadium, New Delhi	Kuwait	1–0	1982 Asian Games
47*	7 October 1983	Bahrain National Stadium, Manama	Bahrain	2–1	1984 Summer Olympic qualifiers
48	27 February 1984	Cairo International Stadium, Cairo	Egypt	2–1	Friendly
49	11 March 1984	Royal Oman Police Stadium, Muscat	Oman	2–1	7th Arabian Gulf Cup
50	11 March 1984	Royal Oman Police Stadium, Muscat	Oman	2–1	7th Arabian Gulf Cup
51	17 March 1984	Royal Oman Police Stadium, Muscat	Saudi Arabia	4–0	7th Arabian Gulf Cup
52	17 March 1984	Royal Oman Police Stadium, Muscat	Saudi Arabia	4–0	7th Arabian Gulf Cup
53	17 March 1984	Royal Oman Police Stadium, Muscat	Saudi Arabia	4–0	7th Arabian Gulf Cup
54	22 March 1984	Royal Oman Police Stadium, Muscat	Kuwait	3–1	7th Arabian Gulf Cup
55	22 March 1984	Royal Oman Police Stadium, Muscat	Kuwait	3–1	7th Arabian Gulf Cup
56*	26 April 1984	Singapore	Malaysia	2–0	1984 Summer Olympics qualifiers
57*	18 May 1984	Amman, Jordan	Jordan	2–3	1985 Arab Nations Cup qualifiers
58*	18 May 1984	Amman, Jordan	Jordan	2–3	1985 Arab Nations Cup qualifiers
59*	30 July 1984	Harvard Stadium, Boston	Canada	1–1	1984 Summer Olympics
60*	3 August 1984	Navy–Marine Corps Memorial Stadium, Annapolis	(Socialist Federal Republic of Yugoslavia) Yugoslavia	2–4	1984 Summer Olympics
61*	15 March 1985	Al-Sadaqua Walsalam Stadium, Kuwait City	Lebanon	6–0	1986 FIFA World Cup qualifiers
62*	15 March 1985	Al-Sadaqua Walsalam Stadium, Kuwait City	Lebanon	6–0	1986 FIFA World Cup qualifiers
63*	18 March 1985	Al-Sadaqua Walsalam Stadium, Kuwait City	Lebanon	6–0	1986 FIFA World Cup qualifiers
64*	18 March 1985	Al-Sadaqua Walsalam Stadium, Kuwait City	Lebanon	6–0	1986 FIFA World Cup qualifiers
65	29 March 1985	King Abdullah Stadium, Amman	Jordan	3–2	1986 FIFA World Cup qualifiers
66*	8 September 1985	King Fahd Stadium, Taif	Saudi Arabia	1–3	Friendly
67	20 September 1985	Al-Rashid Stadium, Dubai	United Arab Emirates	3–2	1986 FIFA World Cup qualifiers
68	20 September 1985	Al-Rashid Stadium, Dubai	United Arab Emirates	3–2	1986 FIFA World Cup qualifiers
69	29 November 1985	King Fahd Stadium, Taif	Syria	3–1	1986 FIFA World Cup qualifiers
70*	3 February 1986	Al-Shaab Stadium, Baghdad	Denmark	2–0	Friendly
71	21 September 1986	Daegu Stadium, Daegu	Oman	4–0	1986 Asian Games
72	25 September 1986	Daegu Stadium, Daegu	United Arab Emirates	1–2	1986 Asian Games
73*	8 April 1987	Bahrain National Stadium, Manama	Bahrain	3–1	Friendly
74*	17 April 1987	Amman	Jordan	2–1	1988 Summer Olympics qualifiers
75*	17 April 1987	Amman	Jordan	2–1	1988 Summer Olympics qualifiers
76*	24 April 1987	Kuwait City	Jordan	2–0	1988 Summer Olympics qualifiers
77*	11 December 1987	Doha	Qatar	3–1	1988 Summer Olympics qualifiers
78	10 February 1989	Al-Shaab Stadium, Baghdad	Qatar	2–2	1990 FIFA World Cup qualifiers

== Honours ==
=== Player ===
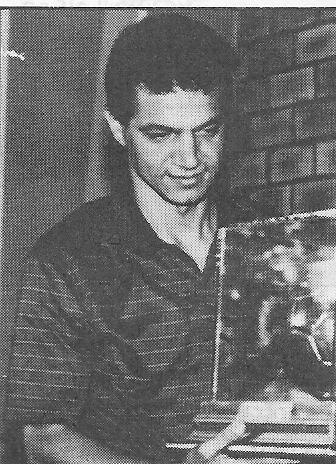
Saeed receiving the Best Arab Goalscorer Award in 1985

Al-Talaba

- Iraqi Premier League: 1980–81, 1981–82, 1985–86
- Stafford Cup: 1984

Iraq U20

- AFC U-19 Championship: 1977

Iraq Military

- World Military Cup: 1979

Iraq

- Arabian Gulf Cup: 1979, 1984
- Asian Games Gold Medal: 1982

Individual

- FIFA Century Club: 2005
- IFFHS's 30 Best Players of the Century – Asia: 2000
- AFC Century Club: 1999
- Al-Watan Al-Riyadhi Magazine's Best Arab Goalscorer: 1985
- Al-Rasheed Magazine's Best Player of the Season: 1985–86
- Iraqi Premier League top goalscorer: 1980–81, 1982–83, 1985–86
- Arabian Gulf Cup Best Player: 1984
- Arabian Gulf Cup top goalscorer: 1979, 1984
- AFC U-19 Championship top goalscorer: 1976, 1977

=== Manager ===
Al-Talaba

- Baghdad Championship: 1993–94

== See also ==
- List of men's footballers with 100 or more international caps
- List of men's footballers with 50 or more international goals
