= Football at the 1978 Asian Games =

- Dates: 10–20 December
- Nations: 14

Medalists
gold medal	North Korea
gold medal	South Korea
bronze medal	China

Football was contested as part of the programme for the 1978 Asian Games which was hosted in Bangkok, Thailand from 9 to 20 December 1978. It was the eighth edition of the men's football tournament at the multi-sport event organised by the Asian Games Federation.

The football tournament began with the first matches of the first group stage on 10 December 1978 and ended with the gold medal match on 20 December 1978. North Korea and South Korea contested the final. No goals were scored in regulation time or in extra time and the gold medal was shared between both teams. In the bronze medal match, China defeated Iraq 1–0.

== Background ==
Football had been part of the Asian Games programme following the debut of the men's competition at the inaugural 1951 Asian Games in India.

Burma, India and Taiwan held the record for gold medals having each won the football tournament twice. Iran were the defending champions after defeating Israel 1–0 as hosts in the final at the 1974 Asian Games.

== Format ==
In total, 14 teams took part in the competition. They were drawn into four single round robin groups – two of four teams and two of three teams. The group winners and runners-up were then drawn into two single round robin groups of four teams. The winners of the second group stage would contest the gold medal match and the runners-up would contest the bronze medal match.

=== Participants ===
- Bahrain
- Bangladesh
- Burma
- China
- India
- Iraq
- Japan
- Kuwait
- Malaysia
- North Korea
- Qatar
- Saudi Arabia
- South Korea
- Thailand

== Draw ==
The draw for the first group stage was held on 8 December 1978.

Group A

- Malaysia
- Bangladesh
- India

Group B

- Qatar
- Saudi Arabia
- Iraq
- China

Group C

- South Korea
- Bahrain
- Kuwait
- Japan

Group D

- North Korea
- Thailand
- Burma

== First group stage ==
=== Group A ===
Malaysia and India advanced to the semi-final group stage.

==== Table ====
Pos	Team	Pld	W	D	L	GF	GA	GD	Pts	Qualification
1	Malaysia	2	2	0	0	2	0	+2	4	Qualification for the semi-final group stage
2	India	2	1	0	1	3	1	+2	2	Qualification for the semi-final group stage
3	Bangladesh	2	0	0	2	0	4	−4	0	

==== Matches ====
10 December 1978

India	0–1	Malaysia

12 December 1978

Bangladesh	0–1	Malaysia

14 December 1978

Bangladesh	0–3	India

=== Group B ===
Iraq and China advanced to the semi-final group stage.

==== Table ====
Pos	Team	Pld	W	D	L	GF	GA	GD	Pts	Qualification
1	Iraq	3	2	1	0	5	2	+3	5	Qualification for the semi-final group stage
2	China	3	2	0	1	4	2	+2	4	Qualification for the semi-final group stage
3	Saudi Arabia	3	0	2	1	3	4	−1	2	
4	Qatar	3	0	1	2	3	7	−4	1	

==== Matches ====
10 December 1978

Iraq	2–1	Qatar

10 December 1978

China	1–0	Saudi Arabia
Shangbin 9'

Suphachalasai Stadium, Bangkok

12 December 1978

Qatar	2–2	Saudi Arabia
Muftah 67', 68'		Mohammed 14' (o.g.); Al-Saqeer 60'

Suphachalasai Stadium, Bangkok
12 December 1978

China	0–2	Iraq

14 December 1978

China	3–0	Qatar

14 December 1978

Iraq	1–1	Saudi Arabia
Ali 53' (pen.)		Sultan 85'

Suphachalasai Stadium, Bangkok

=== Group C ===
South Korea and Kuwait advanced to the semi-final group stage.

==== Table ====
Pos	Team	Pld	W	D	L	GF	GA	GD	Pts	Qualification
1	South Korea	3	3	0	0	10	2	+8	6	Qualification for the semi-final group stage
2	Kuwait	3	2	0	1	5	2	+3	4	Qualification for the semi-final group stage
3	Japan	3	1	0	2	5	5	0	2	
4	Bahrain	3	0	0	3	1	12	−11	0	

==== Matches ====
11 December 1978

Bahrain	1–5	South Korea

11 December 1978

Japan	0–2	Kuwait

13 December 1978

Bahrain	0–4	Japan

13 December 1978

South Korea	2–0	Kuwait

15 December 1978

Japan	1–3	South Korea

15 December 1978

Bahrain	0–3	Kuwait

=== Group D ===
North Korea and Thailand advanced to the semi-final group stage.

==== Table ====
Pos	Team	Pld	W	D	L	GF	GA	GD	Pts	Qualification
1	North Korea	2	2	0	0	6	0	+6	4	Qualification for the semi-final group stage
2	Thailand	2	1	0	1	2	4	−2	2	Qualification for the semi-final group stage
3	Burma	2	0	0	2	1	5	−4	0	

==== Matches ====
11 December 1978

Burma	1–2	Thailand

13 December 1978

Burma	0–3	North Korea

15 December 1978

North Korea	3–0	Thailand

== Semi-final group stage ==
=== Group 1 ===
North Korea advanced to the gold medal match and Iraq advanced to the bronze medal match.

==== Table ====
Pos	Team	Pld	W	D	L	GF	GA	GD	Pts	Qualification
1	North Korea	3	2	1	0	6	3	+3	5	Qualification for the gold medal match
2	Iraq	3	2	0	1	6	1	+5	4	Qualification for the bronze medal match
3	Kuwait	3	1	1	1	8	6	+2	3	
4	India	3	0	0	3	2	12	−10	0	

==== Matches ====
17 December 1978

India	1–6	Kuwait

17 December 1978

Iraq	0–1	North Korea

18 December 1978

Iraq	3–0	Kuwait

18 December 1978

India	1–3	North Korea

19 December 1978

India	0–3	Iraq

19 December 1978

North Korea	2–2	Kuwait

=== Group 2 ===
South Korea advanced to the gold medal match and China advanced to the bronze medal match.

==== Table ====
Pos	Team	Pld	W	D	L	GF	GA	GD	Pts	Qualification
1	South Korea	3	3	0	0	5	1	+4	6	Qualification for the gold medal match
2	China	3	2	0	1	11	3	+8	4	Qualification for the bronze medal match
3	Thailand	3	1	0	2	4	8	−4	2	
4	Malaysia	3	0	0	3	2	10	−8	0	

==== Matches ====
17 December 1978

China	0–1	South Korea

17 December 1978

Malaysia	1–2	Thailand

18 December 1978

China	4–1	Thailand

18 December 1978

Malaysia	0–1	South Korea

19 December 1978

China	7–1	Malaysia

19 December 1978

South Korea	3–1	Thailand

== Bronze medal match ==
China defeated Iraq to win the bronze medal.

20 December 1978

Iraq	0–1	China

== Gold medal match ==
After a goalless 90 minutes and extra time, the gold medal was shared between North Korea and South Korea. As a result, the silver medal was not awarded.

20 December 1978

North Korea	0–0 (a.e.t.)	South Korea
