= Grand Hamad Stadium =

Stadium in Doha, Qatar

Grand Hamad Stadium اســتــاد حــمــد الــكــبــيــر
- Al-Arabi Stadium
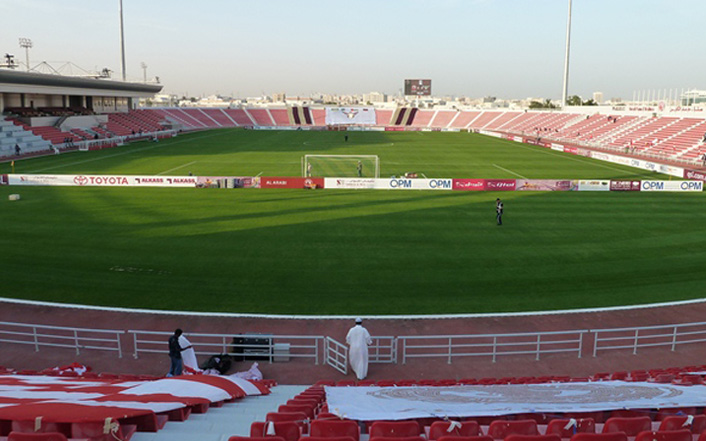
- Interactive map of Grand Hamad Stadium اســتــاد حــمــد الــكــبــيــر
- Full name: Grand Hamad Stadium
- Location: Doha, Qatar
- Coordinates: 25°15′31″N 51°31′19″E
- Owner: Al-Arabi Sport Club
- Capacity: 13,000
- Surface: Grass

Tenant
- Al-Arabi SC (1952–2023)

The Grand Hamad Stadium (Arabic: استاد حمد الكبير), also known as the Al–Arabi Sports Club Stadium, Al-Arabi SC Stadium or Al-Arabi Stadium, is a multi-purpose stadium in Doha, Qatar. The stadium holds 13,000 people, and is currently used mostly for staging football matches, as it is Al-Arabi SC's home ground. The stadium was used extensively during the 2006 Asian Games, and was a venue for several sports, including football, table tennis, rugby sevens, and fencing. The Iraq national football team played their 2014 FIFA World Cup qualification (AFC) matches at the stadium, as did the Yemen national football team in their 2018 FIFA World Cup qualification (AFC) matches. On March 10, 2022, the Brazil national football team announced that the Grand Hamad Stadium was selected as the team base camp during the 2022 FIFA World Cup.

== History ==
Grand Hamad Stadium, one of 20 venues used for the 2006 Asian Games, saw its fair share of sporting events throughout the competition, which included 45 countries, 39 sports, 9,520 competitors, and 424 events. Grand Hamad Stadium, a rectangular venue, was used for both rugby sevens and football matches during this tournament. It also showcased its versatility by holding table tennis matches and other fencing contests. The capacity was increased to 13,000 spectators for the occasion.

The field, which is mostly used to host Al-Arabi SC football games, which are played in the Qatar Stars League, has earned the name Al-Arabi Sports Club Stadium. The Iraq National Team used Grand Hamad Stadium during the 2014 World Cup qualification stages while their national stadium in Basra Sports City was being built.

== FIFA World Cup qualification matches ==
FIFA World Cup qualification matches that were held in the stadium:

Date	Team #1	Res.	Team #2	Round
25 March 2001	Malaysia	4–3	Palestine	Group 3
11 November 2011	Iraq	1–0	China	Group 1
29 February 2012	Iraq	7–1	Singapore	Group 1
12 June 2012	Iraq	1–1	Oman	Group B
16 October 2012	Iraq	1–2	Australia	Group B
14 November 2012	Iraq	1–0	Jordan	Group B
11 June 2013	Iraq	0–1	Japan	Group B
12 March 2015	Yemen	3–1	Pakistan	First Round
8 September 2015	Yemen	0–4	Bahrain	Group H
17 November 2015	Yemen	1–3	Uzbekistan	Group H

== Friendly (national team) Matches ==
Friendly (national Team) Matches that were held in the stadium.

Date	Team #1	Res.	Team #2
6 November 2011	Iraq	1–0	Lebanon
29 May 2013	Oman	1–1	Lebanon
25 March 2014	Yemen	2–0	Nepal
11 April 2014	Philippines	3–0	Nepal
30 October 2014	Philippines	3–0	Nepal
16 December 2018	Palestine	2–0	Pakistan
31 December 2018	Vietnam	4–2	Philippines
8 January 2024	Malaysia	2–2	Syria

== 2024 AFC U-23 Asian Cup ==
Grand Hamad Stadium was chosen one of four alternative venues for the 2024 AFC U-23 Asian Cup.

== See also ==
- Lists of stadiums
- List of football stadiums in Qatar
