= Al-Shaab Stadium =

Multi-purpose stadium in Baghdad, Iraq

Al-Sha'ab Stadium
- ملعب الشعب الدولي
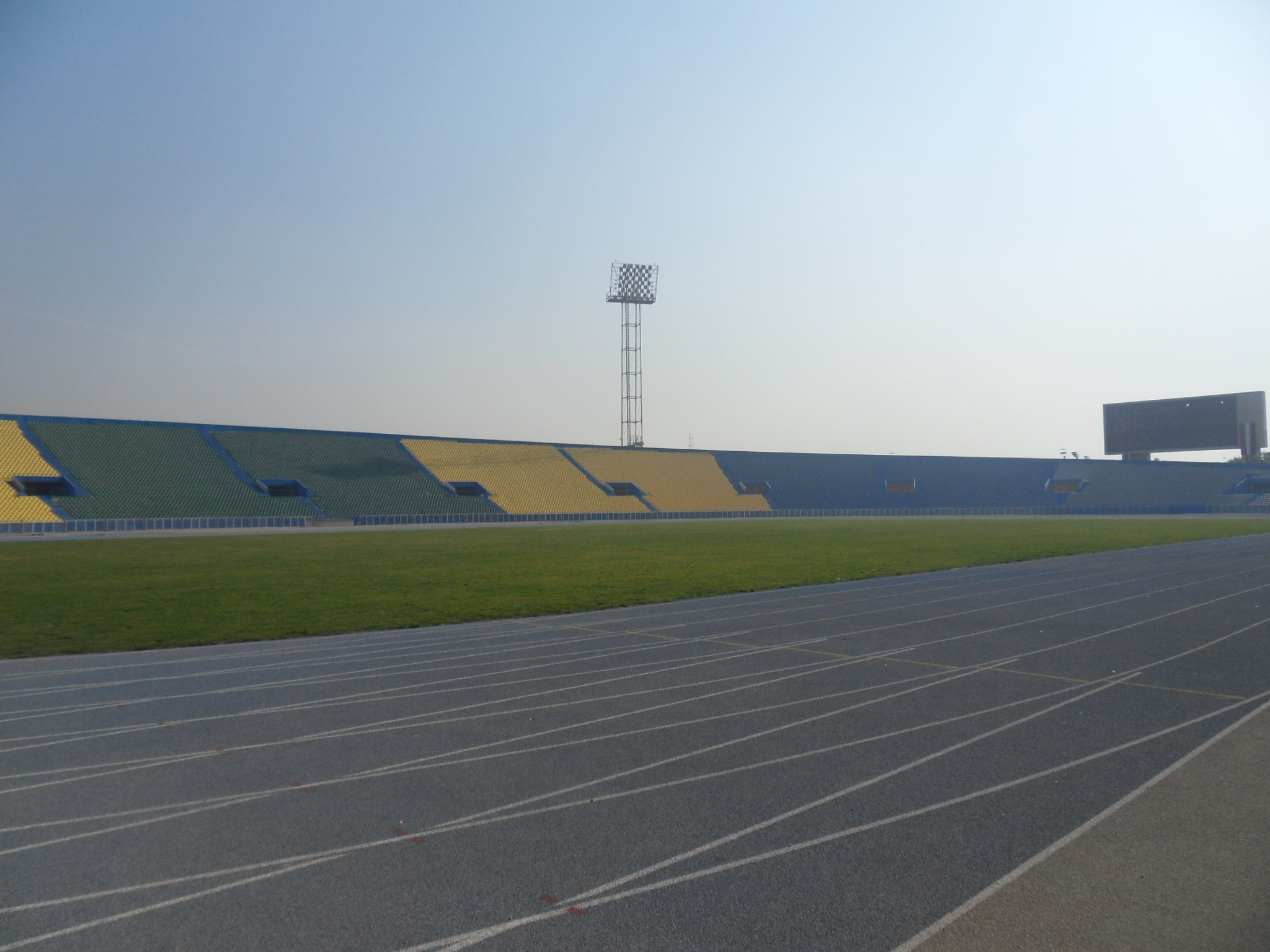
- Al-Sha'ab Stadium in 2010
- Interactive map of Al-Sha'ab Stadium
- Full name: Al-Sha'ab International Stadium
- Location: Baghdad, Iraq
- Coordinates: 33°19′29.53″N 44°26′7.09″E
- Owner: Government of Iraq
- Capacity: 35,700 (original standing capacity was 50,000 prior to being made all-seated in 2010)
- Surface: Grass and track

Construction
- Groundbreaking: April 21, 1960; 66 years ago
- Built: 1960–1966 (6 years)
- Opened: November 6, 1966; 60 years ago
- Renovated: 2005, 2010, 2015, 2023
- Closed: 2003–2005, 2009–2010
- Cost: IQD 1,200,000 (1966)
- Architects: Francisco Keil do Amaral and Carlos Manuel Ramos
- Project manager: Calouste Gulbenkian Foundation
- Main contractor: Tahsin Nu'man Rif'at

Tenants
- Iraq national football team (1966–2013); Al-Shorta SC (2014–2025): Major sporting events hosted; 5th Arabian Gulf Cup; 1982 Arab Club Champions Cup Final; 1985 Arab Club Champions Cup

Al-Sha'ab International Stadium (Arabic: ملعب الشعب الدولي, lit. 'The People's Stadium') is an all-seater multi-purpose stadium in Baghdad, Iraq. The 35,700-seater was the home stadium of the Iraq national football team, as well as the largest stadium in Iraq, from its opening on 6 November 1966 until the Basra International Stadium was opened in 2013. It is owned by the government of Iraq.

The stadium hosted the 5th Arabian Gulf Cup, the 1982 Arab Club Champions Cup final and the full tournament in 1985, the 1972 Palestine Cup and the World Military Cup in 1968 and 1972.

== History ==
=== Construction ===
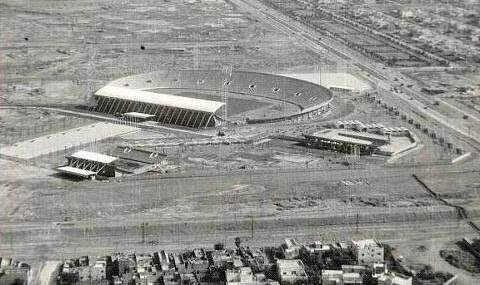
Al-Sha'ab Stadium under construction in 1965.

In late 1959, a delegation from the Calouste Gulbenkian Foundation called upon then Prime Minister Abd al-Karim Qasim. The meeting contained an offer that the foundation presented to the government of Iraq. It was assigning a percentage of the steady grant of oil that is owned by the foundation to build projects in Baghdad. These projects included the Iraqi National Museum, the Iraqi National Theater, the Medical City and Al-Sha'ab Stadium.

Abd al-Karim Qasim announced the building of Al-Sha'ab stadium on 21 April 1960, in front of 15,000 spectators. He said that the building of the new official stadium of the Iraq national football team would be completed in 1962 and will have the capacity of 50,000 spectators.

The cost of construction was 1 million dinars, for the stadium to be one of the biggest in the Middle East. Its total area is 200,000m². It had an athletics track covered with Tartan, lighting towers with the height of 55 meters and the total area of the park is 40,000m² with the capacity of 4,000 cars. The complex had two training stadiums, basketball, volleyball, handball and tennis fields and also it contained an Olympic swimming pool.

=== Opening ===
The opening match of Al-Sha'ab stadium was on 6 November 1966 between the Portuguese team SL Benfica and a team that composed of the best players in Baghdad. 60,000 spectators attended the match at Al-Sha'ab Stadium. 30 minutes into the game, José Augusto Torres scored for Benfica. In the second half, Qasim Mahmoud scored for the Baghdad team at the 55th minute, tying up the game. Benfica made it 2–1 at the 80th minute from a shot by Domiciano Cavém.

6 November 1966	Baghdad XI (Iraq)	1–2	(Portugal) S.L. Benfica	Al-Sha'ab Stadium, Baghdad
	Mahmoud 55'	Report	Torres 30'; Cavém 80'	Attendance: 60,000; Referee: Fahmi al-Qaimaqchi (Iraq)

=== Crisis ===
On 9 April 2003, Al-Sha'ab stadium was severely damaged when it got bombed by the U.S. Air Force during the Battle of Baghdad (2003). Most of its seats were destroyed and numerous large craters werde appeared on the pitch. Until 2004, the stadium was used as an airstrip for the U.S. Air Force. Therefore, in April 2004, the Coalition Provisional Authority Chief Administrator, Paul Bremer, announced that $3 million would be given to renovate Al-Sha'ab Stadium and to make it in a good condition for hosting different sports. The stadium was officially reopened on 12 June 2005, being ready to host some of the 2004–05 Iraqi Premier League matches.

Iraq national football team could not play in Al-Sha'ab stadium from 2005 to 2009 because of the Iraqi Civil War. Iraq's first match in the stadium, after six years of playing the home matches in other countries, was on 13 July 2009, where Iraq met Palestine in an International friendly and won 4–0.

=== Renovations ===
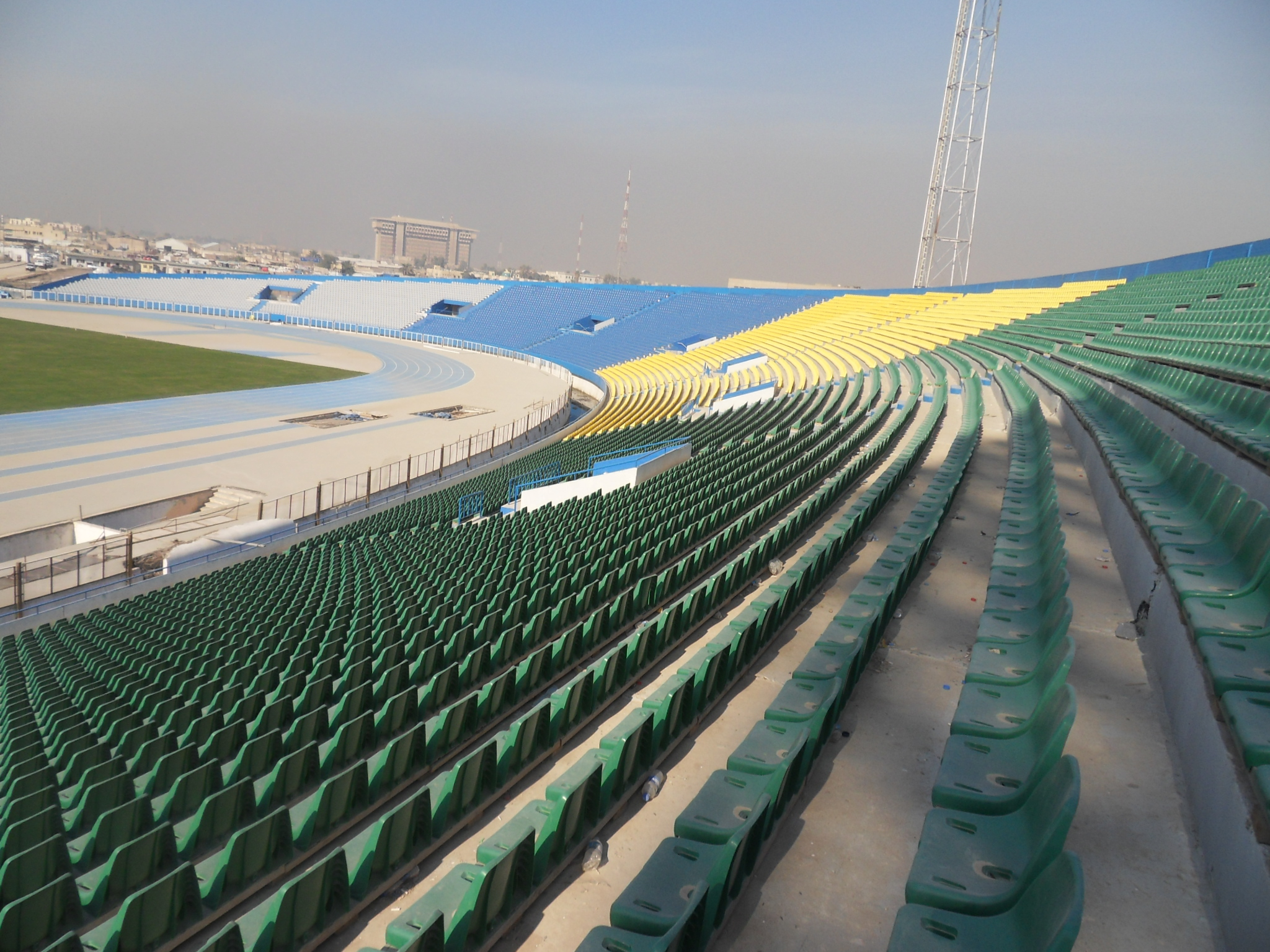
Stands of Al-Sha'ab Stadium in December 2010

Companies started the renovation of Al-Sha'ab stadium on 2 March 2010 with a cost of $3,966,000 from the expense of the Prime Minister of Iraqi Kurdistan Nechervan Barzani. The renovation included replacing the grass with an evergreen grass, the athletics track with a new one that consists of the blue and white colors and also adding yellow, green, blue and grey colored seats to become an all-seater stadium with a capacity of 34,200. The renovation was made by English, Swedish and Russian companies. It was finished on 9 May 2010.

In May 2015, companies cooperated with the Ministry of Youth in renovating the stadium and making it in a good form before a delegation from FIFA visits Iraq to rate Al-Sha'ab stadium and the Basra International Stadium to start lifting the ban from Iraqi stadiums. The renovation included painting the main compartment, putting ceramic floors, reestablish the electric system of the stadium, re-qualifying the park and the outside area of the stadium, putting electric doors and fixing the elevators to the compartments.

On 5 August 2015, the administrative company that is responsible of renovating Al-Sha'ab stadium announced that on 15 August, the renovation continued after it was paused from June to August; because of the Iraqi Premier League. They included replacing the sprinkling system and replacing the pitch, depending on the basis of high-quality international stadiums.

The stadium underwent a new renovation in 2023, with the colour of the seats being changed to blue and white, and 1,500 extra seats were also installed in the ground.

== Tournaments hosted ==
=== World Military Cup ===
Al-Sha'ab stadium hosted the World Military Cup of 1968 and 1972, where the Iraq military national football team did not pass the qualification round in 1968, but in 1972, Iraq became champions after finishing in the top of the league at 6 points, above Italy.

=== 1972 Palestine Cup of Nations ===
Al-Sha'ab stadium hosted the 1972 Palestine Cup of Nations, where Iraq were the runners-up of Egypt after finishing in top of Group A in the groups stage at 5 points. Iraq won over Algeria in the semi-final 3–1 by the goals of Shamil Kamil (2 goals) and Ali Kadhim for Iraq and Mustafa Dahleb for Algeria. In the final, Iraq lost 1–3 against Egypt by the goals of Douglas Aziz for Iraq and Hassan El-Shazly and Abdul-Aziz Abdul-Shafi (2 goals) for Egypt.

=== 5th Arabian Gulf Cup ===
Clips from the opening ceremony of the 5th Arabian Gulf Cup in Al-Sha'ab Stadium.

Al-Sha'ab stadium hosted the 5th Arabian Gulf Cup, where it was one of the best hosts in the history of the Arabian Gulf Cup. The past Iraqi President Ahmed Hassan al-Bakr was represented by Izzat Ibrahim al-Douri in the opening ceremony on 23 March 1979. The opening ceremony was organized and well planned. The first match, after the opening ceremony, was between the hosts, Iraq and Bahrain that ended in a 4–0 win for Iraq. This tournament ended with the hosts as the champions, breaking the streak of Kuwait in winning the Gulf Cup for 4 consecutive tournaments, from 1972 to 1979.

=== 1982 Arab Club Champions Cup final ===
Al-Sha'ab stadium hosted both legs of the final of the first ever Arab Club Champions Cup in 1982, where Iraqi club Al Shorta SC were the champions after beating Lebanese club Nejmeh SC in the first leg of the final 2–0 and drew with them in the second leg 2–2. Al Shorta were awarded in the stadium, being one of the two Iraqi teams who ever won the Arab Club Champions Cup competition. The other team was Al-Rasheed.

=== 1985 Arab Club Champions Cup ===
Al-Sha'ab hosted the third tournament of the Arab Club Champions Cup in 1985, where Al-Rasheed became the champions, after they ended in top of the league in the final stage at 4 points. They beat Nejmeh SC, on 5 December 1985, with a big 6–1 win. On 9 December, they beat Algerian club USM El Harrach with a 2–1 result. Al-Rasheed also won 1986 Arab Club Champions Cup and the 1987 one.

== Important matches ==
=== 31 March 1980 – Kuwait ===
Al-Sha'ab stadium hosted the matches of Group 1 for the 1980 Asian Olympic Qualifying Tournaments, where Round 1 ended with Iraq in the top of the league and Kuwait in 2nd place. In the playoff match between Iraq and Kuwait, 65,000 spectators arrived at the stadium. Iraq ended the first half with the score being 2–0. The goals were scored by Nizar Ashraf at the 6th and 44th minutes. In the second half, the Kuwaitis had an uprising, scoring three goals in 13 minutes. The goals were from Jasem Yaqoub at the 69th minute, Nassir Al-Ghanim at the 79th minute and Yaqoub again in the 82nd minute, qualifying Kuwait into the 1980 Summer Olympics. However, Iraq still qualified to the Olympics after Malaysia withdrew.

=== February 1986 – Denmark League XI ===
After FIFA lifted the ban from Iraqi soil, because of the Iran–Iraq War, the Iraqi Football Association sent an invitation to the Dansk Boldspil-Union for a friendly in Baghdad and in Al-Sha'ab stadium. The DBU sent the Denmark League XI national football team to play against Iraq in two matches regarded by FIFA and IFA as A internationals, but it was not regarded as such by the DBU. The first match was on 1 February, where the Danish team was on top of its game, unlike the Iraqi team, which had many gaps and mistakes, resulting in an early goal in the 6th minute from Claus Nielsen and another one in the 33rd minute from Jan Bartram. In the second match, Iraq dominated the whole match, scoring a goal from Hussein Saeed just before halftime from a penalty and another one from Natiq Hashim Abidoun in the 63rd minute.

1 February 1986	Iraq	0–2	Denmark League XI	Al-Sha'ab Stadium, Baghdad
		Report	Nielsen 6'; Bartram 33'	Attendance: 45,000; Referee: (Iraq) Farouk Tawfiq

3 February 1986	Iraq	2–0	Denmark League XI	Al-Sha'ab Stadium, Baghdad
	Saeed (pen.) 45'; Hashim 63'	Report		Attendance: 45,000; Referee: (Iraq) Salah Abdul-Karim

=== 10 February 1989 – Qatar ===
Al-Sha'ab stadium hosted the home match of Iraq against Qatar in the 1990 FIFA World Cup qualification (AFC), where Iraq needed to win because they were only one point away from first placed Qatar. Iraq and Qatar started the match with rain showering on its ground. In the first half, Iraq were the better side, but because of the slippery ground, the Iraqi defense made some mistakes resulting in a goal for Qatar from Saleh Al-Muhaza in the 18th minute. Ahmed Radhi equalized the score from a header in the 31st minute. In the second half, Iraq controlled the match completely with Qatar wasting time in hope for a draw. But, from counter-attack led by Radhi and Hussein Saeed, Saeed scored his last goal with Iraq, being the most goals scorer for Iraq at 78 goals. In the 85th minute, Qatar equalized the score, after the Iraqi audience at Al-Shaab Stadium were sure of their national team claiming the win, by Adel Khamis. The match ended in a 2–2 draw, which qualified Qatar to the next round of the qualifications. After this match, the Iraqi golden team of the 80s ended with the retiring of Khalil Allawi, Ali Hussein Shihab, Basil Gorgis, Ghanim Oraibi, Ahmad Jassim and Hussein Saeed.

== See also ==
- List of football stadiums in Iraq
