= Al-Minaa SC Under-21s and Academy =

Iraq association football youth system

Al-Minaa Under-21s and Academy
- Full name: Al-Minaa Football Club (Under-21s and Academy)
- Founded: 1931; 95 years ago
- Ground: Al-Fayhaa Stadium
- Capacity: 10,000
- Academy Manager: Mohammed Abdul Hussein
- League: Iraqi Youth Premier League, (Division 1)
Home colours	Away colours

Al-Minaa Football Club Academy is the youth system of Al-Minaa Football Club based in Al Maqal, Basra, Iraq. The academy teams play in the Iraqi Youth Premier League, the highest level of youth football in Iraq. The club also competes in the Basra Clubs Youth League. Former player Mohammed Abdul Hussein is the current academy manager.

Al-Minaa Under-21s, previously referred to as the Reserves, is the highest level squad within the setup. They train at the Al-Minaa Training Centre and play the majority of their home games at Al-Fayhaa Stadium in Basra Sports City.

Al-Minaa's Academy is one of Iraq's most successful, winning several championships, including winning the last Iraqi Youth Premier League title in 2022. Numerous international players have graduated from the academy and reserve teams.

Al-Minaa Academy team also participated in international tournaments, as in the Paris World Games, Football U19, where it participated four times, won the tournament in 2017, and was runner-up three times, the last of which was in 2019.

== Current squad ==
=== Under-21s ===
Note: Flags indicate national team as defined under FIFA eligibility rules; some limited exceptions apply. Players may hold more than one non-FIFA nationality.

No.	Pos.	Nation	Player
9	FW	IRQ	Hassan Mohammed
12	DF	IRQ	Hassan Hamed Khalaf
14	DF	IRQ	Hussein Taher
15	MF	IRQ	Naji Nasser
16	FW	IRQ	Muntadher Qahtan
19	MF	IRQ	Mohammed Saleh
20	DF	IRQ	Mohammed Qasim
22	GK	IRQ	Ashtar Mohammed
23	DF	IRQ	Haider Mohammed
28	MF	IRQ	Zaid Ali Jassim
29	MF	IRQ	Faisal Ghazi
31	GK	IRQ	Hassan Jawad
35	DF	IRQ	Abbas Mohammed

No.	Pos.	Nation	Player
36	FW	IRQ	Mohammed Thaier
38	FW	IRQ	Abbas Sajjad
44	DF	IRQ	Mohammed Karim
45	MF	IRQ	Hassan Hani
47	MF	IRQ	Haider Majed
48	MF	IRQ	Sajjad Adel
50	MF	IRQ	Hussein Abdul Qader
55	MF	IRQ	Majeed Hadi
66	DF	IRQ	Mahdi Hashim Shihan
70	MF	IRQ	Mutair Khalid
77	MF	IRQ	Ali Haider
90	FW	IRQ	Karrar Sajjad

=== Under-19s ===
Note: Flags indicate national team as defined under FIFA eligibility rules; some limited exceptions apply. Players may hold more than one non-FIFA nationality.

No.	Pos.	Nation	Player
2	DF	IRQ	Zain Al-Abidin Hussein
3	DF	IRQ	Ali Abdullah
5	DF	IRQ	Mohammed Kamil
6	MF	IRQ	Abbas Mohammed
7	MF	IRQ	Mahdi Adnan
8	MF	IRQ	Abbas Ahmed
9	FW	IRQ	Baqer Sabea
10	FW	IRQ	Hussien Makki
11	MF	IRQ	Saif Jassim
12	FW	IRQ	Yousef Nima
13	DF	IRQ	Mohammed Malik
14	MF	IRQ	Muqtada Haider
15	FW	IRQ	Ali Waleed

No.	Pos.	Nation	Player
16	FW	IRQ	Hussein Mohammed
17	DF	IRQ	Moammal Malik
18	MF	IRQ	Habib Shaalan
19	FW	IRQ	Abdullah Ammar
20	DF	IRQ	Karrar Qasim
21	DF	IRQ	Muhaimen Hatim
22	GK	IRQ	Dhurgham Emad
23	MF	IRQ	Abbas Ammar
27	MF	IRQ	Aqeel Rahim
29	MF	IRQ	Moammal Hameed
30	GK	IRQ	Ahmed Jassim
37	GK	IRQ	Yousef Bassam

=== Under-17s ===
Note: Flags indicate national team as defined under FIFA eligibility rules; some limited exceptions apply. Players may hold more than one non-FIFA nationality.

No.	Pos.	Nation	Player
1	GK	IRQ	Ammar Ali
2	DF	IRQ	Mahdi Raad
3	DF	IRQ	Hussein Kadhim Salem
4	DF	IRQ	Mohammed Abdullah Jabbar
5	DF	IRQ	Mohammed Akram Hassan
6	MF	IRQ	Baqer Khalid
7	MF	IRQ	Jaafar Salem Gatea
9	FW	IRQ	Ali Taleb Saad
10	FW	IRQ	Muslim Dawood
11	MF	IRQ	Hussein Mohammed Abboud
12	DF	IRQ	Sajjad Bassim Maitham
13	DF	IRQ	Ali Kadhim
14	MF	IRQ	Jaafar Hassan

No.	Pos.	Nation	Player
16	MF	IRQ	Sajjad Muslim
17	MF	IRQ	Mohammed Majed
18	MF	IRQ	Kadhim Dhiaa
19	MF	IRQ	Ali Sabea
20	MF	IRQ	Haider Abdul Qassam
21	GK	IRQ	Abbas Saleh Hassan
22	GK	IRQ	Yousef Alaa
24	FW	IRQ	Mutaz Mohannad
25	MF	IRQ	Falah Nayef Falah
27	DF	IRQ	Hassan Kamil
28	MF	IRQ	Abbas Ahmed
99	FW	IRQ	Zain Al-Abidin Jassim

=== Under-16s ===
Note: Flags indicate national team as defined under FIFA eligibility rules; some limited exceptions apply. Players may hold more than one non-FIFA nationality.

No.	Pos.	Nation	Player
1	GK	IRQ	Haider Qasim
2	DF	IRQ	Humam Jalal
3	DF	IRQ	Mohammed Ridha
4	DF	IRQ	Hussein Abdul Amir
5	DF	IRQ	Ali Mansour
6	MF	IRQ	Hussein Hussam
7	MF	IRQ	Sajjad Raed
8	MF	IRQ	Ali Hussein
9	FW	IRQ	Jamal Maitham
10	FW	IRQ	Mustafa Ali
11	FW	IRQ	Hassan Ahmed
12	DF	IRQ	Hassan Khudhair
13	DF	IRQ	Mohammed Taqi

No.	Pos.	Nation	Player
14	MF	IRQ	Mujtaba Qasim
15	MF	IRQ	Jassim Ahmed
16	MF	IRQ	Ahmed Safaa
17	DF	IRQ	Zaineddine Miqdam
18	MF	IRQ	Hani Nayef
19	MF	IRQ	Kadhim Ali
20	GK	IRQ	Mohammed Saddam
22	GK	IRQ	Hassan Ali
25	DF	IRQ	Hussein Salah
26	DF	IRQ	Hussein Mohammed
27	MF	IRQ	Mahdi Ali
28	MF	IRQ	Abbas Ali

== Current staff ==
Head Coaches:

(Iraq) Ali Jassim	U21 Head Coach
(Iraq) Mohammed Abdul Hussein	U19 Head Coach
(Iraq) Fadhel Nasser	U17 Head Coach
(Iraq) Fadhel Abdul Wahed	U16 Head Coach

Staff:

(Iraq) Haider Abdul Hussein	U21 Assistant Coach
(Iraq) Sajjad Abdul Nabi	U17 Assistant Coach
(Iraq) Waleed Ali	U16 Assistant Coach
(Iraq) Ghassan Abdul Karim	U21 Goalkeeping Coach
(Iraq) Ismail Hashim	U19 Goalkeeping Coach
(Iraq) Wissam Jumaa	U17 Goalkeeping Coach
(Iraq) Mohammed Saleh	U16 Goalkeeping Coach
(Iraq) Ahmed Helou	Fitness Trainer
(Iraq) Ali Sami	Medical Therapist
(Iraq) Haider Karim	Administrative
(Iraq) Ali Abdul Moneim	Administrative

== Honours ==
- Iraqi U21 Premier League: 2

2022–23, 2024–25

- Iraqi U19 Premier League: 3

2021–22, 2024–25, 2025–26

- Iraqi U16 Premier League: 2

2023–24, 2025–26

- Basra Clubs U19 League: 2

2009, 2011

- Basra Clubs U16 League: 4

2009, 2011, 2015, 2019

- Paris World Games, Football U19: 1

2017

== Academy graduates ==
This is a list of former Al-Minaa academy or Al-Minaa 'A' graduates who have gone on to represent their country at full international level. Players who are still at Al-Minaa, or play at another club on loan from Al-Minaa, are highlighted in bold.

- (Iraq) Alaa Abdul-Hussein
- (Iraq) Ammar Abdul-Hussein
- (Iraq) Mohammed Abdul Hussein
- (Iraq) Amer Abdul Wahab
- (Iraq) Hussein Abdul-Wahid
- (Iraq) Ali Abdul Zahra
- (Iraq) Nazar Abdul Zahra
- (Iraq) Sabeeh Abed Ali
- (Iraq) Hamza Adnan
- (Iraq) Abdul Razzaq Ahmed
- (Iraq) Alaa Ahmad
- (Iraq) Hadi Ahmed
- (Iraq) Karim Allawi
- (Iraq) Emad Aoda
- (Iraq) Rahim Bakr
- (Iraq) Nasser Talla Dahilan
- (Iraq) Saeed Easho
- (Iraq) Qais Essa
- (Iraq) Ghazi Fahad
- (Iraq) Hussein Falah
- (Iraq) Nawaf Falah
- (Iraq) **Ahmed Farhan**
- (Iraq) Mahir Habib
- (Iraq) Abdul Mahdi Hadi
- (Iraq) Jalil Hanoon
- (Iraq) Jamil Hanoon
- (Iraq) Hussein Hashim
- (Iraq) Ali Husni
- (Iraq) Hussam Ibrahim
- (Iraq) Ali Jawad Ismail
- (Iraq) Shaker Ismail
- (Iraq) Safaa Jabbar
- (Iraq) Karim Jafar
- (Iraq) Ahmed Jalal
- (Iraq) Rahim Karim
- (Iraq) Adel Khudhair
- (Iraq) Percy Lynsdale
- (Iraq) Wesam Malik
- (Iraq) Jassim Mohammed
- (Iraq) Karrar Mohammed
- (Iraq) Muslim Mubarak
- (Iraq) Adel Nasser
- (Iraq) Alaa Nayrouz
- (Iraq) Ali Qasim
- (Iraq) Hamza Qasim
- (Iraq) Mohammed Jabbar Rubat
- (Iraq) Abdul Amir Sabri
- (Iraq) Mohammed Nasser Shakroun
- (Iraq) Mohammed Jabbar Shokan
- (Iraq) Oday Taleb
- (Iraq) Faleh Hassan Wasfi
- (Iraq) **Ahmed Yahya**
