= Mejbel Fartous =

Iraqi footballer & coach (born 1950)

Mejbil Fartous
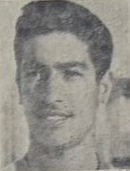

Personal information
- Full name: Mejbil Fartous Diab
- Date of birth: 6 July 1950 (age 76)
- Place of birth: Erbil, Iraq
- Position: Defender

Team information
- Current team: Al-Quwa Al-Jawiya (Technical Advisor.)

Youth career
- –1967: Al-Quwa Al-Jawiya

Senior career*
Years	Team	Apps	(Gls)
1967−1978	Al-Quwa Al-Jawiya		

International career
1967	Iraq U20		
1967−1973	Iraq U23	12	(0)
1967−1977	Iraq	72	(1)

Managerial career
- 1978–1979: Al-Quwa Al-Jawiya
- 1983: Iraq (assistant coach)
- 1984–1986: Al-Quwa Al-Jawiya
- 1992–1994: Al-Naft
- 2000–2001: Al Wakrah
- 2007: Al Wakrah
- 2018–: Al-Quwa Al-Jawiya (Technical Advisor.)
- * Club domestic league appearances and goals

Mejbil Fartous (Arabic: مجبل فرطوس; born 6 July 1950) is an Iraqi football coach and former footballer who used to play as a defender.

== International goals ==
Iraq national football team goals
Scores and results list Iraq's goal tally first.

#	Date	Venue	Opponent	Score	Result	Competition
1.	6 April 1976	Doha, Qatar	United Arab Emirates	4–0	4–0	4th Arabian Gulf Cup

== Honours ==
=== Club ===
Al-Quwa Al-Jawiya

- Iraqi Premier League: 1974–75
- Iraqi National First Division: 1973–74
- Iraq Central FA Premier League: 1972–73
- Iraq FA Baghdad Cup: 1973–74

=== International ===
- Palestine Cup of Nations runner-up: 1975
- Arabian Gulf Cup runner-up: 1976

=== Individual ===
- 4th Arabian Gulf Cup Best Defender Award
