= 1948–49 Iraq FA Basra League =

Iraq FA Basra Premier League
- Season: 1948–49
- Champions: Al-Minaa (1st title)

The 1948–49 Iraq FA Basra League was the first season of the Iraq FA Basra Premier League (the top division of football in Basra from 1948 to 1973), which was formed when the Basra branch of the newly founded Iraq Football Association took over the existing league competition in Basra (the Students League Cup).

The competition started in November 1948, with the regular season being played in a round-robin format. Al-Minaa and Sharikat Naft Al-Basra qualified for the final in May 1949 by occupying the top two positions in the league table, and Al-Minaa were crowned inaugural Iraq FA Basra League champions with a 1–0 victory, preventing their opponents from completing a Basra League and Iraq FA Cup double.

== Regular season ==
Team	Result
Sharikat Naft Al-Basra	Qualified to the Final
Al-Minaa	Qualified to the Final
Sikak Al-Basra
British Club
Armenian Youth
Al-Ittihad
Shabab Al-Maqal
Thanawiyat Al-Basra

=== Known results ===
Home \ Away	ITT	MIN	SIK	ARM	BRI	SHM	SNB	THA
Al-Ittihad					5–0			
Al-Minaa			5–0					
Sikak Al-Basra				7–0				
Armenian Youth						1–0		
British Club								5–3
Shabab Al-Maqal								
Sharikat Naft Al-Basra			1–0			11–0		8–0
Thanawiyat Al-Basra								

Source: The Iraq Times
Legend: Blue = home team win; Yellow = draw; Red = away team win.

== Final ==
May 1949

Al-Minaa	1–0	Sharikat Naft Al-Basra
Stanley 23' (pen.)

Thanawiyat Al-Basra Stadium, Basra
