= 1949–50 Iraq FA Basra League =

Iraq FA Basra Premier League
- Season: 1949–50
- Champions: Sharikat Naft Al-Basra (1st title)

The 1949–50 Iraq FA Basra League was the second season of the Iraq FA Basra Premier League (the top division of football in Basra from 1948 to 1973) organised by the Basra branch of the Iraq Football Association. The tournament began on 19 October 1949, and the regular season ended in November 1949 with Sharikat Naft Al-Basra and Al-Ittihad qualifying for the final. Sharikat Naft Al-Basra beat Al-Ittihad 5–1 in January 1950 to win the title for the first time.

== Regular season ==
Pos	Team	Pld	W	D	L	GF	GA	GAv	Pts	Qualification
1	Sharikat Naft Al-Basra	5	5	0	0	32	2	16.000	10	Qualified to the Final
2	Al-Ittihad	5	3	1	1	12	14	0.857	7	Qualified to the Final
3	Al-Minaa	5	3	0	2	4	6	0.667	6	
4	Thanawiyat Al-Basra	5	1	1	3	7	17	0.412	3	
5	Sikak Al-Basra	5	0	3	2	7	13	0.538	3	
6	Sharikat Naft Al-Rafidain	5	0	1	4	5	15	0.333	1	

Source: The Iraq Times

=== Results ===
Home \ Away	ITT	MIN	SIK	SNB	SNR	THA
Al-Ittihad		2–1			3–1	5–3
Al-Minaa			– (Note: The Al-Minaa–Sikak Al-Basra match was counted as a win for Al-Minaa and a loss for Sikak Al-Basra as Sikak Al-Basra did not turn up for the game.)	1–4		
Sikak Al-Basra	2–2				3–3	2–2
Sharikat Naft Al-Basra	7–0		6–0		6–1	
Sharikat Naft Al-Rafidain		0–1				0–2
Thanawiyat Al-Basra		0–1		0–9		

Source: The Iraq Times
Legend: Blue = home team win; Yellow = draw; Red = away team win.

== Final ==
January 1950

Sharikat Naft Al-Basra	5–1	Al-Ittihad
Abdullah 27'; Lynsdale 32'; Ismail 33', 47'; Joharian		(penalty missed); Mahdi

Thanawiyat Al-Basra Stadium, Basra
