= List of football clubs in Iraq by major honours won =

This is a list of the major honours won by football clubs in Iraq. It lists every Iraqi association football club to have won any of the major top-tier domestic trophies at a national level or major continental or regional trophies.

== Key ==
- Domestic competitions

ISL = Iraq Stars League
IFD = Iraqi National First Division League (defunct in 1974)
FAC = Iraq FA Cup
SC = Iraqi Super Cup
BC = Baghdad Championship (defunct in 2004)

- Continental/regional competitions

ACL2 = AFC Cup / AFC Champions League Two
ACCC = Arab Club Champions Cup
GCCL = GFF Gulf Club Champions League

== Honours table ==
Correct as of 28 May 2026
Clubs in bold have won two or more of the above-mentioned trophies in the same season at least once; clubs tied in total honours are listed chronologically in reverse by last win

	Club	ISL	IFD	FAC	SC	BC	ACL2	ACCC	GCCL	Total	Last trophy
1	**Al-Zawraa**	**14**	—	**16**	**5**	**3**	—	—	—	38	2021 SC
2	**Al-Quwa Al-Jawiya**	8	**1**	6	2	**3**	**3**	—	—	23	2026 ISL
3	**Al-Shorta**	8	—	1	2	**3**	—	1	—	15	2025 ISL
4	**Al-Talaba**	5	—	2	1	**3**	—	—	—	11	2003 FAC
5	**Al-Rasheed**	3	—	2	1	—	—	**3**	—	9	1989 ISL
6	Erbil	4	—	—	—	—	—	—	—	4	2012 ISL
7	**Duhok**	1	—	1	—	—	—	—	**1**	3	2025 FAC
=	Al-Jaish	1	—	2	—	—	—	—	—	3	1984 ISL
9	Al-Karkh	—	—	1	—	—	—	—	—	1	2022 FAC
=	Naft Al-Wasat	1	—	—	—	—	—	—	—	1	2015 ISL
=	Al-Najaf	—	—	—	—	1	—	—	—	1	1997 BC
=	Al-Sinaa	—	—	1	—	—	—	—	—	1	1984 FAC
=	Salahaddin	1	—	—	—	—	—	—	—	1	1983 ISL
=	Al-Minaa	1	—	—	—	—	—	—	—	1	1978 ISL
=	Sharikat Naft Al-Basra	—	—	1	—	—	—	—	—	1	1949 FAC
