= Mejbil Jwayed =

Iraqi footballer

Personal information
- Full name: Mejbil Jwayed Tuama
- Place of birth: Basra, Iraq
- Position: Forward

Senior career*
Years	Team	Apps	(Gls)
1972–1974	Al-Mashat		
1974–1976	Al-Baladiyat		
1976–1978	Al-Ittihad		

International career
1973	Iraq		
- * Club domestic league appearances and goals

Mejbil Jwayed (Arabic: مجبل جويد , born in Basra) is a former Iraqi football forward who played for Iraq in 1973 Palestine Cup of Nations.

Jwayed played for Al-Mashat, Al-Baladiyat and Al-Ittihad, he is considered the owner of the first goal in the history of the Iraqi Premier League, as he scored it for Al-Baladiyat against Al-Rafidain in the 1974–75 season.
