= Kuwait national football team results (1961–1979) =

This article provides details of international football games played by the Kuwait national football team from 1961 to 1979.

== Results ==
Key
Win
Draw
Defeat

=== 1961 ===
3 September 1961 Pan Arab Games	Kuwait	2–2	Libya	Morocco

4 September 1961 Pan Arab Games	United Arab Republic	8–0	Kuwait	Morocco

6 September 1961 Pan Arab Games	Lebanon	4–0	Kuwait	Morocco

8 September 1961 Pan Arab Games	Morocco	3–1	Kuwait	Morocco

10 September 1961 Pan Arab Games	Saudi Arabia	1–0	Kuwait	Morocco

=== 1963 ===
6 January 1963 Friendly	Kuwait	2–1	Jordan	Lebanon

3 March 1963 Friendly	Tunisia	2–1	Kuwait	Lebanon

31 March 1963 1963 Arab Cup	Lebanon	6–0	Kuwait	Lebanon

2 April 1963 1963 Arab Cup	Kuwait	4–0	Jordan	Lebanon

6 April 1963 1963 Arab Cup	Tunisia	5–1	Kuwait	Lebanon

7 April 1963 1963 Arab Cup	Syria	4–0	Kuwait	Lebanon

=== 1964 ===
13 November 1964 1964 Arab Cup	Kuwait	0–1	Iraq	Kuwait

15 November 1964 1964 Arab Cup	Kuwait	2–0	Jordan	Kuwait

16 November 1964 1964 Arab Cup	Kuwait	1–1	Libya	Kuwait

20 November 1964 1964 Arab Cup	Kuwait	2–3	Lebanon	Kuwait

=== 1965 ===
12 March 1965 Libya tournament	Morocco	2–0	Kuwait	Libya

14 March 1965 Libya tournament	Libya	4–1	Kuwait	Libya

19 March 1965 Libya tournament	Tunisia	1–0	Kuwait	Libya

=== 1966 ===
1 April 1966 1966 Arab Cup	Iraq	3–1	Kuwait	Baghdad, Iraq
	Yousif; Dhiab; Atta			Stadium: Al-Kashafa Stadium

3 April 1966 1966 Arab Cup	Lebanon	2–1	Kuwait	Baghdad, Iraq
	El-Sharki 1' (?)		Al-Dawla	Stadium: Al-Kashafa Stadium

6 April 1966 1966 Arab Cup	Kuwait	4–4	Bahrain	Baghdad, Iraq
				Stadium: Al-Kashafa Stadium

8 April 1966 1966 Arab Cup	Jordan	0–4	Kuwait	Baghdad, Iraq
				Stadium: Al-Kashafa Stadium

=== 1969 ===
1969 Friendly	Kuwait	8–3	Bahrain	Kuwait

=== 1970 ===
28 March 1970 Friendly	Kuwait	3–1	Saudi Arabia	Bahrain

31 March 1970 Friendly	Kuwait	4–2	Qatar	Bahrain

3 April 1970 Friendly	Bahrain	1–3	Kuwait	Bahrain

=== 1971 ===
1971 Friendly	Kuwait	1–1	Sudan	Kuwait

28 January 1971 Friendly	Iraq	2–0	Kuwait	Iraq

1971 Friendly	Kuwait	1–2	East Germany	Kuwait

1971 Friendly	Kuwait	1–1	Iraq military	Kuwait

19 November 1971 Friendly	Iraq	3–1	Kuwait	Iraq

3 December 1971 Friendly	Iran	2–0	Kuwait	Iran

10 December 1971 Friendly	Kuwait	1–1	Iraq	Kuwait

14 December 1971 Friendly	Kuwait	1–0	Lebanon	Kuwait

17 December 1971 Friendly	Kuwait	2–2	Syria	Kuwait

21 December 1971 Friendly	Kuwait	2–0	Jordan	Kuwait

24 December 1971 Friendly	Kuwait	0–1	Iraq	Kuwait

=== 1972 ===
1 January 1972 Friendly	Kuwait	3–2	Libya	Iraq

5 January 1972 Friendly	Egypt	2–0	Kuwait	Iraq

7 January 1972 Friendly	Iraq	3–1	Kuwait	Iraq

15 January 1972 Friendly	Iran	2–0	Kuwait	Greece

16 March 1972 Friendly	Saudi Arabia	2–2	Kuwait	Saudi Arabia

18 March 1972 Friendly	Kuwait	2–0	Bahrain	Saudi Arabia

22 March 1972 Friendly	Kuwait	7–0	United Arab Emirates	Saudi Arabia

26 March 1972 Friendly	Kuwait	5–0	Qatar	Saudi Arabia

8 May 1972 Friendly	Thailand	0–2	Kuwait	Thailand

12 May 1972 Friendly	Kuwait	2–1	South Korea	Thailand

14 May 1972 Friendly	Cambodia	4–0	Kuwait	Thailand

=== 1973 ===
1973 Friendly	Kuwait	4–1	Qatar	Kuwait

1973 Friendly	Kuwait	9–0	Qatar	Kuwait

4 May 1973 Friendly	Syria	2–1	Kuwait	Iran

6 May 1973 Friendly	Iran	2–1	Kuwait	Iran

8 May 1973 Friendly	Kuwait	0–0	North Korea	Iran

11 May 1973 Friendly	Syria	2–0	Kuwait	Iran

13 May 1973 Friendly	Iran	2–0	Kuwait	Iran

15 May 1973 Friendly	Kuwait	2–0	North Korea	Iran

26 July 1973 Friendly	Malaysia	0–0	Kuwait	Malaysia

28 July 1973 Friendly	Kuwait	2–0	Singapore	Malaysia

31 July 1973 Friendly	Kuwait	2–1	Bangladesh	Malaysia

5 August 1973 Friendly	Burma	2–0	Kuwait	Malaysia

8 August 1973 Friendly	Kuwait	2–1	South Vietnam	Malaysia

12 August 1973 Friendly	Malaysia	3–1	Kuwait	Malaysia

=== 1974 ===
8 February 1974 Friendly	Kuwait	1–3	Bulgaria	Kuwait

10 February 1974 Friendly	Kuwait	1–2	Bulgaria	Kuwait

25 February 1974 Friendly	Kuwait	0–2	Morocco	Kuwait

15 March 1974 Friendly	Kuwait	2–0	United Arab Emirates	Kuwait

19 March 1974 Friendly	Kuwait	5–0	Oman	Kuwait

24 March 1974 Friendly	Kuwait	1–0	Qatar	Kuwait

26 March 1974 Friendly	Kuwait	6–0	United Arab Emirates	Kuwait

29 March 1974 Friendly	Kuwait	4–0	Saudi Arabia	Kuwait

2 September 1974 Friendly	Kuwait	3–2	Thailand	Iran

6 September 1974 Friendly	Kuwait	4–0	South Korea	Iran

10 September 1974 Friendly	North Korea	2–0	Kuwait	Iran

12 September 1974 Friendly	Kuwait	5–2	Burma	Iran

=== 1975 ===
14 January 1975 Friendly	Kuwait	1–0	Libya	Kuwait

14 August 1975 Friendly	China	3–3	Kuwait	China

20 August 1975 Olympic Games qualifier	Iraq	2–1	Kuwait	Iran

22 August 1975 Olympic Games qualifier	Iran	1–1	Kuwait	Iran

24 August 1975 Olympic Games qualifier	Kuwait	2–1	Bahrain	Iran

27 August 1975 Olympic Games qualifier	Kuwait	4–2	Saudi Arabia	Iran

=== 1976 ===
28 March 1976 1976 Gulf Cup	Qatar	0–4	Kuwait	Doha, Qatar
				Stadium: Khalifa Sports City Stadium

31 March 1976 1976 Gulf Cup	Kuwait	8–0	Oman	Doha, Qatar
				Stadium: Khalifa Sports City Stadium

3 April 1976 1976 Gulf Cup	Kuwait	0–0	United Arab Emirates	Doha, Qatar
				Stadium: Khalifa Sports City Stadium

6 April 1976 1976 Gulf Cup	Kuwait	5–2	Bahrain	Doha, Qatar
				Stadium: Khalifa Sports City Stadium

8 April 1976 1976 Gulf Cup	Iraq	2–2	Kuwait	Doha, Qatar
				Stadium: Khalifa Sports City Stadium

11 April 1976 1976 Gulf Cup	Kuwait	3–1	Saudi Arabia	Doha, Qatar
				Stadium: Khalifa Sports City Stadium

15 April 1976 1976 Gulf Cup	Kuwait	4–2	Iraq	Doha, Qatar
				Stadium: Khalifa Sports City Stadium

3 June 1976 1976 Asian Cup GS	Kuwait	2–0	Malaysia	Tabriz, Iran
	Al-Anberi 10'; Al-Dakhil 42'			Stadium: Bagh Shomal Stadium

7 June 1976 1976 Asian Cup GS	Kuwait	1–0	China	Tabriz, Iran
	Kameel 1'			Stadium: Bagh Shomal Stadium

11 June 1976 1976 Asian Cup SF	Kuwait	3–2 (a.e.t.)	Iraq	Tehran, Iran
	Ibrahim 11'; Kameel 77', 100'		Abdul-Jalil 46'; Hassan 85'	Stadium: Aryamehr Stadium; Attendance: 60,000

13 June 1976 1976 Asian Cup Final	Iran	1–0	Kuwait	Tehran, Iran
	Parvin 71'			Stadium: Aryamehr Stadium; Attendance: 100,000; Referee: Jean Dubach (Switzerland)

=== 1977 ===
11 March 1977 1978 World Cup qualification	Kuwait	2–0	Bahrain	Qatar

15 March 1977 1978 World Cup qualification	Qatar	0–2	Kuwait	Qatar

17 March 1977 1978 World Cup qualification	Kuwait	2–1	Bahrain	Qatar

21 March 1977 1978 World Cup qualification	Qatar	1–4	Kuwait	Qatar

6 September 1977 Friendly	Wales	0–0	Kuwait	Wales

20 September 1977 Friendly	Kuwait	0–0	Wales	Kuwait

2 October 1977 1978 World Cup qualification	Hong Kong	1–3	Kuwait	Hong Kong

9 October 1977 1978 World Cup qualification	South Korea	1–0	Kuwait	South Korea

16 October 1977 1978 World Cup qualification	Australia	1–2	Kuwait	Australia

28 October 1977 1978 World Cup qualification	Iran	1–0	Kuwait	Iran

5 November 1977 1978 World Cup qualification	Kuwait	2–2	South Korea	Kuwait

12 November 1977 1978 World Cup qualification	Kuwait	4–0	Hong Kong	Kuwait

19 November 1977 1978 World Cup qualification	Kuwait	1–0	Australia	Kuwait

3 December 1977 1978 World Cup qualification	Kuwait	1–2	Iran	Kuwait

=== 1978 ===
11 December 1978 Friendly	Kuwait	2–0	Japan	Thailand

13 December 1978 Friendly	South Korea	2–0	Kuwait	Thailand

15 December 1978 Friendly	Kuwait	3–0	Bahrain	Thailand

17 December 1978 Friendly	Kuwait	6–1	India	Thailand

18 December 1978 Friendly	Iraq	3–0	Kuwait	Thailand

19 December 1978 Friendly	Kuwait	2–2	North Korea	Thailand

=== 1979 ===
28 February 1979 Friendly	Kuwait	0–2	Sweden	Kuwait

24 March 1979 Friendly	Kuwait	3–1	Qatar	Iraq

29 March 1979 Friendly	Iraq	3–1	Kuwait	Iraq

31 March 1979 Friendly	Kuwait	7–0	United Arab Emirates	Iraq

2 April 1979 Friendly	Kuwait	2–0	Oman	Iraq

5 April 1979 Friendly	Kuwait	0–0	Saudi Arabia	Iraq

8 April 1979 Friendly	Kuwait	2–0	Bahrain	Iraq
