= Iraq at the AFC Asian Cup =

This is a record of Iraq's results at the AFC Asian Cup. Iraq have appeared in the finals of the AFC Asian Cup on ten occasions: in 1972 and 1976, and from 1996 to 2023. Their best ever performance was becoming champions in the 2007 tournament held in Indonesia, Malaysia, Thailand and Vietnam.

== Overall record ==
| AFC Asian Cup record | | | | | | | | | | Qualification record | | | | | |
| Year | Round | Position | Pld | W | D* | L | GF | GA | Squad | Pld | W | D | L | GF | GA |
|---|---|---|---|---|---|---|---|---|---|---|---|---|---|---|---|
| (Hong Kong) 1956 to (Iran) 1968 | Not an AFC member | | | | | | | | | Not an AFC member | | | | | |
| (Thailand) 1972 | Group stage | 6th | 3 | 0 | 2 | 1 | 1 | 4 | Squad | 6 | 5 | 1 | 0 | 13 | 2 |
| (Iran) 1976 | Fourth place | 4th | 4 | 1 | 0 | 3 | 3 | 6 | Squad | 6 | 5 | 1 | 0 | 14 | 3 |
| (Kuwait) 1980 to 1988 | Withdrew | | | | | | | | | Withdrew | | | | | |
| (Japan) 1992 | Banned due to Gulf War | | | | | | | | | Banned due to Gulf War | | | | | |
| (United Arab Emirates) 1996 | Quarter-finals | 6th | 4 | 2 | 0 | 2 | 6 | 4 | Squad | 2 | 2 | 0 | 0 | 4 | 0 |
| (Lebanon) 2000 | Quarter-finals | 8th | 4 | 1 | 1 | 2 | 5 | 7 | Squad | 3 | 3 | 0 | 0 | 9 | 2 |
| (China) 2004 | Quarter-finals | 8th | 4 | 2 | 0 | 2 | 5 | 7 | Squad | 6 | 4 | 1 | 1 | 16 | 4 |
| (Indonesia) (Malaysia) (Thailand) (Vietnam) 2007 | Champions | 1st | 6 | 3 | 3 | 0 | 7 | 2 | Squad | 6 | 3 | 2 | 1 | 12 | 8 |
| (Qatar) 2011 | Quarter-finals | 8th | 4 | 2 | 0 | 2 | 3 | 3 | Squad | Qualified as defending champions | | | | | |
| (Australia) 2015 | Fourth place | 4th | 6 | 2 | 1 | 3 | 8 | 9 | Squad | 6 | 3 | 0 | 3 | 7 | 6 |
| (United Arab Emirates) 2019 | Round of 16 | 14th | 4 | 2 | 1 | 1 | 6 | 3 | Squad | 6 | 3 | 3 | 0 | 13 | 6 |
| (Qatar) 2023 | Round of 16 | 12th | 4 | 3 | 0 | 1 | 10 | 7 | Squad | 8 | 5 | 2 | 1 | 14 | 4 |
| (Saudi Arabia) 2027 | Qualified | | | | | | | | | 6 | 6 | 0 | 0 | 17 | 2 |
| Total | 1 title | 11/15 | 43 | 18 | 8 | 17 | 54 | 52 | — | 55 | 39 | 10 | 6 | 119 | 37 |
Champions Runners-up Third place Fourth place *Draws include knockout matches decided via penalty shoot-out.

=== Record by opponent ===
AFC Asian Cup matches (by team)
| Opponent | Played | Wins | Draws | Losses | Goals scored | Goals conceded | Last win |
|---|---|---|---|---|---|---|---|
| South Korea | 3 | 0 | 2** | 1 | 0 | 2 | — |
| Iran | 7 | 1 | 2* | 4 | 6 | 12 | 1996 |
| Thailand | 4 | 2 | 2 | 0 | 8 | 3 | 2000 |
| South Yemen | 1 | 1 | 0 | 0 | 1 | 0 | 1976 |
| Kuwait | 1 | 0 | 0 | 1 | 2 | 3 | — |
| China | 2 | 0 | 0 | 2 | 0 | 4 | — |
| Saudi Arabia | 3 | 2 | 0 | 1 | 3 | 2 | 2007 |
| United Arab Emirates | 3 | 1 | 0 | 2 | 3 | 4 | 2011 |
| Lebanon | 1 | 0 | 1 | 0 | 2 | 2 | — |
| Japan | 3 | 1 | 0 | 2 | 3 | 5 | 2023 |
| Uzbekistan | 1 | 0 | 0 | 1 | 0 | 1 | — |
| Turkmenistan | 1 | 1 | 0 | 0 | 3 | 2 | 2004 |
| Australia | 2 | 1 | 0 | 1 | 3 | 2 | 2007 |
| Oman | 1 | 0 | 1 | 0 | 0 | 0 | — |
| Vietnam | 3 | 3 | 0 | 0 | 8 | 4 | 2023 |
| North Korea | 1 | 1 | 0 | 0 | 1 | 0 | 2011 |
| Jordan | 2 | 1 | 0 | 1 | 3 | 3 | 2015 |
| Palestine | 1 | 1 | 0 | 0 | 2 | 0 | 2015 |
| Yemen | 1 | 1 | 0 | 0 | 3 | 0 | 2019 |
| Qatar | 1 | 0 | 0 | 1 | 0 | 1 | — |
| Indonesia | 1 | 1 | 0 | 0 | 3 | 1 | 2023 |

*Iraq defeated Iran in the 2015 quarter-finals via penalty shoot-out
**Iraq defeated South Korea in both the 1972 preliminary round and the 2007 semi-finals via penalty shoot-out

=== Record results ===
Iraq's Asian Cup record
| First match | South Korea 0–0 (2–4 p.) Iraq (7 May 1972; Bangkok, Thailand) |
| Biggest win | Iraq 4–1 Thailand (11 December 1996; Dubai, United Arab Emirates); Yemen 0–3 Iraq (12 January 2019; Sharjah, United Arab Emirates) |
| Biggest defeat | Iran 3–0 Iraq (9 May 1972; Bangkok, Thailand); Japan 4–1 Iraq (24 October 2000; Beirut, Lebanon); China 3–0 Iraq (30 July 2004; Beijing, China) |
| Best result | Champions in 2007 |
| Worst result | Group stage in 1972 |

== Thailand 1972 ==
=== Group allocation match ===
7 May 1972

| South Korea | 0–0 | Iraq |
Penalties
| Cha Bum-kun (penalty scored); Hwang Jae-man (penalty scored); Park Su-deok (penalty missed) | 2–4 | (penalty scored) Aziz; (penalty scored) Nouri; (penalty scored) Kadhim; (penalty scored) Fathi |

National Stadium, Bangkok
Attendance: 2,000

=== Group A ===
| Team | Pld | W | D | L | GF | GA | GD | Pts |
|---|---|---|---|---|---|---|---|---|
| Iran | 2 | 2 | 0 | 0 | 6 | 2 | +4 | 4 |
| Thailand | 2 | 0 | 1 | 1 | 3 | 4 | −1 | 1 |
| Iraq | 2 | 0 | 1 | 1 | 1 | 4 | −3 | 1 |

9 May 1972

| Iran | 3–0 | Iraq |
|---|---|---|
| Kalani 34', 70', 78' |

National Stadium, Bangkok
Attendance: 5,000
Referee: Sivapalan Kathiravale (Malaysia)

11 May 1972

| Thailand | 1–1 | Iraq |
|---|---|---|
| | | Yousif |

National Stadium, Bangkok

== Iran 1976 ==
=== Group B ===
| Team | Pld | W | D | L | GF | GA | GD | Pts |
|---|---|---|---|---|---|---|---|---|
| Iran | 2 | 2 | 0 | 0 | 10 | 0 | +10 | 4 |
| Iraq | 2 | 1 | 0 | 1 | 1 | 2 | −1 | 2 |
| South Yemen | 2 | 0 | 0 | 2 | 0 | 9 | −9 | 0 |

4 June 1976

| Iran | 2–0 | Iraq |
|---|---|---|
| Nouraei 45'; Roshan 58' |

Aryamehr Stadium, Tehran
Attendance: 50,000
Referee: Marijan Raus (Yugoslavia)

6 June 1976

| Iraq | 1–0 | South Yemen |
|---|---|---|
| Waal 84' |

Aryamehr Stadium, Tehran

=== Semi-finals ===
11 June 1976

| Kuwait | 3–2 (a.e.t.) | Iraq |
|---|---|---|
| Ibrahim 11'; Kamel 77', 100' | | Abdul-Jalil 46'; Hassan 85' |

Aryamehr Stadium, Tehran
Attendance: 60,000

=== Third place match ===
13 June 1976

| Iraq | 0–1 | China |
|---|---|---|
| | | He Jia 61' |

Aryamehr Stadium, Tehran

== United Arab Emirates 1996 ==
=== Group B ===
| Team | Pld | W | D | L | GF | GA | GD | Pts |
|---|---|---|---|---|---|---|---|---|
| Iran | 3 | 2 | 0 | 1 | 7 | 3 | +4 | 6 |
| Saudi Arabia | 3 | 2 | 0 | 1 | 7 | 3 | +4 | 6 |
| Iraq | 3 | 2 | 0 | 1 | 6 | 3 | +3 | 6 |
| Thailand | 3 | 0 | 0 | 3 | 2 | 13 | −11 | 0 |

5 December 1996
19:00

| Iran | 1–2 | Iraq |
|---|---|---|
| Daei 90' (pen.) | Report | Hussam Fawzi 37'; Khalid Sabbar 69' |

Al-Maktoum Stadium, Dubai
Attendance: 15,000
Referee: Masayoshi Okada (Japan)

8 December 1996
16:45

| Saudi Arabia | 1–0 | Iraq |
|---|---|---|
| Al-Mehallel 26' | Report |

Al-Maktoum Stadium, Dubai
Attendance: 12,000
Referee: Ali Bujsaim (United Arab Emirates)

11 December 1996
19:00

| Iraq | 4–1 | Thailand |
|---|---|---|
| Haidar Mahmoud 17', 50'; Laith Hussein 23', 63' | Report | Chalermsan 26' |

Al-Maktoum Stadium, Dubai
Attendance: 3,000
Referee: Kim Young-Joo (South Korea)

=== Quarter-finals ===
15 December 1996
16:45

| United Arab Emirates | 1–0 (a.e.t.) | Iraq |
|---|---|---|
| Ab. Ibrahim 103' | Report |

Sheikh Zayed Stadium, Abu Dhabi
Attendance: 50,000
Referee: Gamal Al-Ghandour (Egypt)

== Lebanon 2000 ==
=== Group A ===
| Team | Pld | W | D | L | GF | GA | GD | Pts |
|---|---|---|---|---|---|---|---|---|
| Iran | 3 | 2 | 1 | 0 | 6 | 1 | +5 | 7 |
| Iraq | 3 | 1 | 1 | 1 | 4 | 3 | +1 | 4 |
| Thailand | 3 | 0 | 2 | 1 | 2 | 4 | −2 | 2 |
| Lebanon | 3 | 0 | 2 | 1 | 3 | 7 | −4 | 2 |

12 October 2000
15:05

| Iraq | 2–0 | Thailand |
|---|---|---|
| Qahtan Chathir 27'; Haidar Mahmoud 60' | Report |

Saida Municipal Stadium, Sidon
Attendance: 2,500
Referee: Toru Kamikawa (Japan)

15 October 2000
19:45

| Lebanon | 2–2 | Iraq |
|---|---|---|
| Chahrour 28'; Hojeij 76' | Report | Sabah Jeayer 5', 22' |

Sports City Stadium, Beirut
Attendance: 30,000
Referee: Kim Young-Joo (South Korea)

18 October 2000
19:35

| Iran | 1–0 | Iraq |
|---|---|---|
| Daei 77' | Report |

Saida Municipal Stadium, Sidon
Attendance: 8,582
Referee: Omer Al-Mehannah (Saudi Arabia)

=== Quarter-finals ===
24 October 2000
16:45

| Japan | 4–1 | Iraq |
|---|---|---|
| Nanami 8', 29'; Takahara 11'; Myojin 62' | Report | Abbas Obeid 4' |

Sports City Stadium, Beirut
Attendance: 2,000
Referee: Tajaddin Fares (Syria)

== China 2004 ==
=== Group C ===
| Team | Pld | W | D | L | GF | GA | GD | Pts |
|---|---|---|---|---|---|---|---|---|
| Uzbekistan | 3 | 3 | 0 | 0 | 3 | 0 | +3 | 9 |
| Iraq | 3 | 2 | 0 | 1 | 5 | 4 | +1 | 6 |
| Turkmenistan | 3 | 0 | 1 | 2 | 4 | 6 | −2 | 1 |
| Saudi Arabia | 3 | 0 | 1 | 2 | 3 | 5 | −2 | 1 |

18 July 2004
21:15

| Iraq | 0–1 | Uzbekistan |
|---|---|---|
| | Report | Qosimov 21' |

Sichuan Longquanyi Stadium, Chengdu
Attendance: 12,400
Referee: Kwon Jong-chul (South Korea)

22 July 2004
18:30

| Turkmenistan | 2–3 | Iraq |
|---|---|---|
| V. Bayramov 14'; Kuliyyew 85' | Report | Hawar Mohammed 12'; Razzaq Farhan 80'; Qusay Munir 88' |

Sichuan Longquanyi Stadium, Chengdu
Attendance: 22,000
Referee: Saad Kamil Al-Fadhli (Kuwait)

26 July 2004
19:00

| Saudi Arabia | 1–2 | Iraq |
|---|---|---|
| Al-Montashari 57' | Report | Nashat Akram 51'; Younis Mahmoud 86' |

Sichuan Longquanyi Stadium, Chengdu
Attendance: 15,000
Referee: Kwon Jong-chul (South Korea)

=== Quarter-finals ===
30 July 2004
21:00

| China | 3–0 | Iraq |
|---|---|---|
| Hao Haidong 8'; Zheng Zhi 81' (pen.), 90+2' (pen.) | Report |

Workers Stadium, Beijing
Attendance: 60,000
Referee: Shamsul Maidin (Singapore)

== Indonesia/Malaysia/Thailand/Vietnam 2007 ==
=== Group A ===
| Team | Pld | W | D | L | GF | GA | GD | Pts |
|---|---|---|---|---|---|---|---|---|
| Iraq | 3 | 1 | 2 | 0 | 4 | 2 | +2 | 5 |
| Australia | 3 | 1 | 1 | 1 | 6 | 4 | +2 | 4 |
| Thailand | 3 | 1 | 1 | 1 | 3 | 5 | −2 | 4 |
| Oman | 3 | 0 | 2 | 1 | 1 | 3 | −2 | 2 |

7 July 2007
19:35 UTC+7

| Thailand | 1–1 | Iraq |
|---|---|---|
| Suksomkit 6' (pen.) | Report | Younis Mahmoud 32' |

Rajamangala Stadium, Bangkok
Attendance: 30,000
Referee: Kwon Jong-chul (South Korea)

13 July 2007
17:20 UTC+7

| Iraq | 3–1 | Australia |
|---|---|---|
| Nashat Akram 22'; Hawar Mohammed 60'; Karrar Jassim 86' | Report | Viduka 47' |

Rajamangala Stadium, Bangkok
Attendance: 6,000
Referee: Jasim Karim (Bahrain)

16 July 2007
19:35 UTC+7

| Oman | 0–0 | Iraq |
|---|---|---|
| | Report |

Supachalasai Stadium, Bangkok
Attendance: 500
Referee: Eddy Maillet (Seychelles)

=== Quarter-finals ===
21 July 2007
20:20 UTC+7

| Iraq | 2–0 | Vietnam |
|---|---|---|
| Younis Mahmoud 2', 65' | Report |

Rajamangala Stadium, Bangkok
Attendance: 9,720
Referee: Yuichi Nishimura (Japan)

=== Semi-finals ===
25 July 2007
18:20 UTC+8

| Iraq | 0–0 (a.e.t.) | South Korea |
|---|---|---|
| | Report |
Penalties
| Hawar Mohammed (penalty scored); Qusay Munir (penalty scored); Haidar Abdul-Amir (penalty scored); Ahmad Mnajed (penalty scored) | 4–3 | (penalty scored) Lee Chun-soo; (penalty scored) Lee Dong-gook; (penalty scored) Cho Jae-jin; (penalty missed) Yeom Ki-hun; (penalty missed) Kim Jung-woo |

Bukit Jalil Stadium, Kuala Lumpur
Attendance: 12,500
Referee: Saad Kamil Al-Fadhli (Kuwait)

=== Final ===
29 July 2007
19:35 UTC+7

| Iraq | 1–0 | Saudi Arabia |
|---|---|---|
| Younis Mahmoud 72' | Report |

Gelora Bung Karno Stadium, Jakarta
Attendance: 60,000
Referee: Mark Shield (Australia)

== Qatar 2011 ==
=== Group D ===
| Team | Pld | W | D | L | GF | GA | GD | Pts |
|---|---|---|---|---|---|---|---|---|
| Iran | 3 | 3 | 0 | 0 | 6 | 1 | +5 | 9 |
| Iraq | 3 | 2 | 0 | 1 | 3 | 2 | +1 | 6 |
| North Korea | 3 | 0 | 1 | 2 | 0 | 2 | −2 | 1 |
| United Arab Emirates | 3 | 0 | 1 | 2 | 0 | 4 | −4 | 1 |

11 January 2011
19:15

| Iraq | 1–2 | Iran |
|---|---|---|
| Mahmoud 13' | Report | Rezaei 42'; Mobali 84' |

Ahmed bin Ali Stadium, Al Rayyan
Attendance: 10,478
Referee: Ravshan Irmatov (Uzbekistan)

15 January 2011
19:15

| United Arab Emirates | 0–1 | Iraq |
|---|---|---|
| | | W. Abbas 90+3' (o.g.) |

Ahmed bin Ali Stadium, Al Rayyan
Attendance: 7,233
Referee: Yuichi Nishimura (Japan)

19 January 2011
19:15

| Iraq | 1–0 | North Korea |
|---|---|---|
| Jassim 22' |

Ahmed bin Ali Stadium, Al Rayyan
Attendance: 4,111
Referee: Subkhiddin Mohd Salleh (Malaysia)

=== Quarter-finals ===
22 January 2011
16:25

| Australia | 1–0 (a.e.t.) | Iraq |
|---|---|---|
| Kewell 118' |

Jassim Bin Hamad Stadium, Doha
Attendance: 7,889
Referee: Abdulrahman Abdou (Qatar)

== Australia 2015 ==
=== Group D ===
| Pos | Team | Pld | W | D | L | GF | GA | GD | Pts | Qualification |
|---|---|---|---|---|---|---|---|---|---|---|
| 1 | Japan | 3 | 3 | 0 | 0 | 7 | 0 | +7 | 9 | Advance to knockout stage |
| 2 | Iraq | 3 | 2 | 0 | 1 | 3 | 1 | +2 | 6 | Advance to knockout stage |
| 3 | Jordan | 3 | 1 | 0 | 2 | 5 | 4 | +1 | 3 | |
| 4 | Palestine | 3 | 0 | 0 | 3 | 1 | 11 | −10 | 0 | |

Updated to match(es) played on 16 January 2015. Source: Asian Cup Australia 2015
Rules for classification: Tiebreakers
12 January 2015
19:00 AEST (UTC+10)

| Jordan | 0–1 | Iraq |
|---|---|---|
| | Report | Kasim 77' |

Brisbane Stadium, Brisbane
Attendance: 6,840
Referee: Fahad Al-Mirdasi (Saudi Arabia)

16 January 2015
19:00 AEST (UTC+10)

| Iraq | 0–1 | Japan |
|---|---|---|
| | Report | Honda 23' (pen.) |

Brisbane Stadium, Brisbane
Attendance: 22,941
Referee: Alireza Faghani (Iran)

20 January 2015
20:00 AEDT (UTC+11)

| Iraq | 2–0 | Palestine |
|---|---|---|
| Mahmoud 48'; Yasin 88' | Report |

Canberra Stadium, Canberra
Attendance: 10,235
Referee: Abdulla Hassan Mohamed (United Arab Emirates)

=== Quarter-finals ===
23 January 2015
17:30 AEDT (UTC+11)

| Iran | 3–3 (a.e.t.) | Iraq |
|---|---|---|
| Azmoun 24'; Pouraliganji 103'; Ghoochannejhad 118' | Report | Yasin 56'; Mahmoud 93'; Ismail 116' (pen.) |
Penalties
| Hajsafi (penalty missed); Pouraliganji (penalty scored); Nekounam (penalty scored); Hosseini (penalty scored); Ghafouri (penalty scored); Jahanbakhsh (penalty scored); Teymourian (penalty scored); Amiri (penalty missed) | 6–7 | (penalty missed) Abdul-Amir; (penalty scored) Salem; (penalty scored) Ismail; (penalty scored) Adnan; (penalty scored) Mahmoud; (penalty scored) Kasim; (penalty scored) Hussein; (penalty scored) Shaker |

Canberra Stadium, Canberra
Attendance: 18,921
Referee: Ben Williams (Australia)

=== Semi-finals ===
26 January 2015
20:00 AEDT (UTC+11)

| South Korea | 2–0 | Iraq |
|---|---|---|
| Lee Jung-hyup 20'; Kim Young-gwon 50' | Report |

Stadium Australia, Sydney
Attendance: 36,053
Referee: Ryuji Sato (Japan)

=== Third place match ===
30 January 2015
20:00 AEDT (UTC+11)

| Iraq | 2–3 | United Arab Emirates |
|---|---|---|
| Salem 28'; Kalaf 42' | Report | Khalil 16', 51'; Mabkhout 57' (pen.) |

Newcastle Stadium, Newcastle
Attendance: 12,829
Referee: Nawaf Shukralla (Bahrain)

== United Arab Emirates 2019 ==
=== Group D ===
| Pos | Team | Pld | W | D | L | GF | GA | GD | Pts | Qualification |
|---|---|---|---|---|---|---|---|---|---|---|
| 1 | Iran | 3 | 2 | 1 | 0 | 7 | 0 | +7 | 7 | Advance to knockout stage |
| 2 | Iraq | 3 | 2 | 1 | 0 | 6 | 2 | +4 | 7 | Advance to knockout stage |
| 3 | Vietnam | 3 | 1 | 0 | 2 | 4 | 5 | −1 | 3 | Advance to knockout stage |
| 4 | Yemen | 3 | 0 | 0 | 3 | 0 | 10 | −10 | 0 | |

Source: AFC
Rules for classification: Group stage tiebreakers
8 January 2019
17:30

| Iraq | 3–2 | Vietnam |
|---|---|---|
| M. Ali 35'; Tariq 60'; Adnan 90' | Report | Faez 24' (o.g.); Nguyễn Công Phượng 42' |

Zayed Sports City Stadium, Abu Dhabi
Referee: Abdulrahman Al-Jassim (Qatar)

12 January 2019
17:30

| Yemen | 0–3 | Iraq |
|---|---|---|
| | Report | M. Ali 11'; Resan 19'; Abbas 90+1' |

Sharjah Stadium, Sharjah
Referee: Fu Ming (China)

16 January 2019
20:00

| Iran | 0–0 | Iraq |
|---|---|---|
| | Report |

Al Maktoum Stadium, Dubai
Attendance: 15,038
Referee: Ravshan Irmatov (Uzbekistan)

=== Round of 16 ===
22 January 2019
20:00

| Qatar | 1–0 | Iraq |
|---|---|---|
| Al-Rawi 62' | Report |

Al Nahyan Stadium, Abu Dhabi
Referee: Muhammad Taqi (Singapore)

== Qatar 2023 ==
=== Group D ===
| Pos | Team | Pld | W | D | L | GF | GA | GD | Pts | Qualification |
|---|---|---|---|---|---|---|---|---|---|---|
| 1 | Iraq | 3 | 3 | 0 | 0 | 8 | 4 | +4 | 9 | Advance to knockout stage |
| 2 | Japan | 3 | 2 | 0 | 1 | 8 | 5 | +3 | 6 | Advance to knockout stage |
| 3 | Indonesia | 3 | 1 | 0 | 2 | 3 | 6 | −3 | 3 | Advance to knockout stage |
| 4 | Vietnam | 3 | 0 | 0 | 3 | 4 | 8 | −4 | 0 | |

Source: AFC
15 January 2024
17:30

| Indonesia | 1–3 | Iraq |
|---|---|---|
| Marselino 37' | Report | M. Ali 17'; Rashid 45+7'; Hussein 75' |

Ahmad bin Ali Stadium, Al Rayyan
Attendance: 16,532
Referee: Ilgiz Tantashev (Uzbekistan)

19 January 2024
14:30

| Iraq | 2–1 | Japan |
|---|---|---|
| Hussein 5', 45+4' | Report | Endo 90+3' |

Education City Stadium, Al Rayyan
Attendance: 38,663
Referee: Khalid Al-Turais (Saudi Arabia)

24 January 2024
14:30

| Iraq | 3–2 | Vietnam |
|---|---|---|
| Sulaka 47'; Hussein 73', 90+12' (pen.) | Report | Bùi Hoàng Việt Anh 42'; Nguyễn Quang Hải 90+1' |

Jassim bin Hamad Stadium, Al Rayyan
Attendance: 8,932
Referee: Nazmi Nasaruddin (Malaysia)

=== Knockout stage ===
==== Round of 16 ====
29 January 2024
14:30

| Iraq | 2–3 | Jordan |
|---|---|---|
| Natiq 68'; Hussein 76' | Report | Al-Naimat 45+1'; Al-Arab 90+5'; Al-Rashdan 90+7' |

Khalifa International Stadium, Al Rayyan
Attendance: 35,814
Referee: Alireza Faghani (Australia)

== See also ==
- Iraq at the FIFA World Cup
