= 1948–49 Iraq FA Cup =

Tournament details
- Country: Iraq
- Dates: 21 January – 7 April 1949
- Teams: 25

Final positions
- Champions: Sharikat Naft Al-Basra (1st title)
- Runner-up: Al-Kuliya Al-Askariya Al-Malakiya

The 1948–49 Iraq Football Association Cup was the first edition of what is now the Iraq FA Cup. Clubs and institute-representative teams participated in the tournament, which was won by Sharikat Naft Al-Basra, beating Al-Kuliya Al-Askariya Al-Malakiya 2–1 in Iraq's first ever national cup final, played at Al-Kashafa Stadium in Baghdad on 7 April 1949. The winning team's players and staff paraded the trophy around Basra upon returning from Baghdad three days after winning the tournament.

== Background ==
Within the first week of the founding of the Iraq Football Association in October 1948, it was decided to hold league championships in four different regions: Baghdad, Basra, Kirkuk and Mosul (although the league in Mosul did not start until two seasons later). It was also decided to hold a 16-team national knockout cup tournament called the Iraq Football Association Cup between the top teams from each regional league.

At the beginning of November, it was decided to increase the number of teams participating in the cup by allowing some second-tier teams from Baghdad to compete. After the season's Iraq FA Baghdad League had to be shortened to a single round-robin format rather than a double round-robin due to rainy weather postponing a number of games, the Iraq FA Cup was opened up to all clubs from Baghdad wishing to compete in order to compensate for the reduced number of regional matches. 25 teams (including one team who were disqualified from the first round) eventually took part in the competition.

It was to be the last edition of the national knockout cup for clubs or institutions for another 26 years, with such cup tournaments being played at a regional level during that time (such as the Iraq FA Baghdad Cup), until the Iraq FA Cup returned in the 1975–76 season as a clubs-only competition.

== First round ==
The first round was played between Baghdad-based teams, starting on 21 January and ending on 13 February.

Al-Kuliya Al-Askariya Al-Malakiya, Al-Malaki, Al-Ahli, Ittihad Muntada Al-Karkh, Al-Haras Al-Malaki and Al-Tayour Al-Zarqaa received byes to the second round, while Al-Shorta Select XI were awarded a walkover due to their opponents Kuliyat Al-Huqooq being disqualified for not showing up for two matches in their regional league.

Al-Shorta Select XI	w/o from	Kuliyat Al-Huqooq

Wizarat Al-Maarif	W–L	Sharikat Naft Al-Rafidain

Al-Sikak Al-Hadeed	L–W	Al-Sinaa Al-Askariya

Jihad Al-Karkh	W–L	Al-Haras Al-Malaki B

12 February 1949

Madfaiat Baghdad	W–L	British Institute

13 February 1949

Casuals	0–3 (a.e.t.)	Armenian Young Men's Association

== Second round ==
The second round started on 12 February and saw the entry of four Kirkuk-based teams; it ended on 24 February.

=== Kirkuk region ===
12 February 1949

Armenian Relief Corps	2–0	Al-Firqa Al-Thaniya

13 February 1949

Al-Dhahab Al-Aswad	4–2	Al-Athoreen

Sharikat Naft Al-Iraq Stadium, Kirkuk

=== Baghdad region ===
19 February 1949

Al-Shorta Select XI	2–3	Ittihad Muntada Al-Karkh

Al-Kashafa Stadium, Baghdad
19 February 1949

Al-Ahli	3–0	Madfaiat Baghdad

Al-Kashafa Stadium, Baghdad
20 February 1949

Al-Haras Al-Malaki	3–2 (a.e.t.)	Jihad Al-Karkh

Al-Kashafa Stadium, Baghdad
20 February 1949

Al-Tayour Al-Zarqaa	3–2	Wizarat Al-Maarif

Al-Kashafa Stadium, Baghdad
20 February 1949

Al-Kuliya Al-Askariya Al-Malakiya	7–0	Al-Sinaa Al-Askariya

Al-Kuliya Al-Askariya Al-Malakiya Stadium, Baghdad
24 February 1949

Armenian Young Men's Association	0–5	Al-Malaki

Al-Kashafa Stadium, Baghdad

== Third round ==
The third round was held in February 1949 with three matches played in the Baghdad region.

25 February 1949

Al-Haras Al-Malaki	2–1	Al-Tayour Al-Zarqaa

Al-Kashafa Stadium, Baghdad
27 February 1949

Ittihad Muntada Al-Karkh	1–0	Al-Ahli

Al-Kashafa Stadium, Baghdad
27 February 1949

Al-Kuliya Al-Askariya Al-Malakiya	5–0	Al-Malaki

Al-Kashafa Stadium, Baghdad

== Final phase ==
The quarter-final round was the first round in which teams from different regions faced each other. It included two Basra-based teams (Sharikat Naft Al-Basra and Al-Minaa) and one Mosul-based team (Adadiyat Al-Mosul).

Quarter-finals
Ittihad Muntada Al-Karkh	2
Sharikat Naft Al-Basra	4
Al-Minaa	0
Al-Haras Al-Malaki	2
Al-Kuliya Al-Askariya Al-Malakiya	7
Armenian Relief Corps	1
Al-Dhahab Al-Aswad	4
Adadiyat Al-Mosul	2

Semi-finals
Sharikat Naft Al-Basra	2
Al-Haras Al-Malaki	1
Al-Kuliya Al-Askariya Al-Malakiya	3
Al-Dhahab Al-Aswad	0

Final
Sharikat Naft Al-Basra	2
Al-Kuliya Al-Askariya Al-Malakiya	1

== Quarter-finals ==
The quarter-final matches were played between 10 March to 21 March.

10 March 1949
15:00 UTC+03:00

Ittihad Muntada Al-Karkh	2–4	Sharikat Naft Al-Basra

Al-Kashafa Stadium, Baghdad
18 March 1949
15:00 UTC+03:00

Al-Minaa	0–2	Al-Haras Al-Malaki
		Peshka; Tobias

Thanawiyat Al-Basra Stadium, Basra
20 March 1949
15:00 UTC+03:00

Al-Dhahab Al-Aswad	4–2	Adadiyat Al-Mosul

Sharikat Naft Al-Iraq Stadium, Kirkuk
21 March 1949
15:00 UTC+03:00

Al-Kuliya Al-Askariya Al-Malakiya	7–1	Armenian Relief Corps

Al-Kashafa Stadium, Baghdad

== Semi-finals ==
The semi-final matches were played on 1 April and 3 April.

1 April 1949

Sharikat Naft Al-Basra	2–1	Al-Haras Al-Malaki
Majeed 15'; Ismail 18' (pen.)		Goal

Adadiyat Al-Basra Stadium, Basra
Attendance: 3,500
3 April 1949
08:30 UTC+03:00

Al-Kuliya Al-Askariya Al-Malakiya	3–0	Al-Dhahab Al-Aswad

Al-Kashafa Stadium, Baghdad

== Final ==
The final was played on 7 April at Al-Kashafa Stadium in Baghdad to crown the first ever Iraq FA Cup winners. The ball used in the final was supplied by the Baghdad Sports Depot.

7 April 1949
15:00 UTC+03:00

Sharikat Naft Al-Basra	2–1	Al-Kuliya Al-Askariya Al-Malakiya
3'; Lynsdale		Faraj, (penalty missed) , (penalty missed)

Al-Kashafa Stadium, Baghdad
Referee: Stanley D. Holloway (Stoke-on-Trent)

GK	(United Kingdom) Potts
DF	(Iraq) Arshak Bedrossian
DF	(Iraq) Kurken Harikian
MF	(Iraq) Saeed Easho
MF	(Iraq) Jabbar Hussein
MF	(Iraq) Jafar Abid
FW	(Iraq) Herand Joharian
FW	(Iraq) Shaker Ismail
FW	(Iraq) Hameed Majeed
FW	(Iraq) Percy Lynsdale
FW	(Iraq) Nabih Afif
Manager:
(Iraq) Tommy Thomas

GK	(Iraq) Mahmoud Alaras
DF	(Iraq) Hassan Sabri
DF	(Iraq) Mohammed Ali
MF	(Iraq) Ibrahim Al-Sheikh
MF	(Iraq) Abdul-Wadud Khalil
MF	(Iraq) Sattar Al-Sheikhli
FW	(Iraq) Kelo Hussein
FW	(Iraq) Salih Faraj
FW	(Iraq) Shawqi Aboud
FW	(Iraq) Kamal Mohammed Ali
FW	(Iraq) Akram Nashat
Manager:
(Iraq) Hamid Qadir Al-Samarrai

Iraq FA Cup
1948–49 winner
Sharikat Naft Al-Basra
1st title
