= Iraq Central FA Cup =

Iraq Central FA Cup may refer to:

- Iraq Central FA Premier League, a league tournament previously known as the Iraq Central FA First Division Cup
- Iraq FA Baghdad Cup, a cup tournament organised by the Iraq Central FA
