= 1950–51 Iraq FA Basra League =

Iraq FA Basra Premier League
- Season: 1950–51
- Champions: Sharikat Naft Al-Basra (2nd title)

The 1950–51 Iraq FA Basra League was the third season of the Iraq FA Basra Premier League (the top division of football in Basra from 1948 to 1973) organised by the Basra branch of the Iraq Football Association. The tournament began on 7 November 1950 and the regular season ended in January 1951 with Sharikat Naft Al-Basra and Thanawiyat Al-Basra qualifying for the final. Sharikat Naft Al-Basra won the final to clinch the title for the second consecutive time.

== Regular season ==
Pos	Team	Pld	W	D	L	GF	GA	GAv	Pts	Qualification
1	Sharikat Naft Al-Basra	6	5	0	1	21	4	5.250	10	Qualified to the Final
2	Thanawiyat Al-Basra	6	4	2	0	16	7	2.286	10	Qualified to the Final
3	Al-Minaa	6	4	1	1	27	6	4.500	9	
4	Al-Ittihad	6	3	1	2	11	9	1.222	7	
5	Talabat Al-Basra	6	2	0	4	8	14	0.571	4	
6	Al-Amir	6	1	0	5	6	14	0.429	2	
7	Adadiyat Al-Basra	6	0	0	6	2	37	0.054	0	

Source: The Iraq Times

=== Results ===
Home \ Away	AMR	ITT	MIN	TLB	ADA	SNB	THA
Al-Amir					4–1		1–4
Al-Ittihad	2–1				5–0		
Al-Minaa	4–0	2–1			14–0	1–3	2–2
Talabat Al-Basra	– (Note: The Talabat Al-Basra–Al-Amir match was counted as a win for Talabat Al-Basra and a loss for Al-Amir as Al-Amir did not turn up for the game.)	1–3	0–4				1–3
Adadiyat Al-Basra				0–6			
Sharikat Naft Al-Basra	3–0	5–0		4–0	4–0		2–3
Thanawiyat Al-Basra		0–0			4–1		

Source: The Iraq Times
Legend: Blue = home team win; Yellow = draw; Red = away team win.

== Final ==
1951

Sharikat Naft Al-Basra	W–L	Thanawiyat Al-Basra
