= Iraqi National First Division =

- Champions: Al-Quwa Al-Jawiya
- Relegated: Maslahat Naqil Al-Rukab; Shortat Sulaymaniya
- Top goalscorer: Zahrawi Jaber; Ammo Yousif (13 goals each)

The 1973–74 Iraqi National First Division League was a football tournament organised by the Iraq Football Association (IFA) in the 1973–74 season, which was formed as the first top-tier national league in Iraq to replace the Iraq Central FA Premier League and the leagues in other provinces such as Basra, Kirkuk and Mosul. The tournament began on 11 October 1973.

Matches that ended in a draw were settled via penalty shootout (with no extra time), with the winner of the shootout earning one point. Al-Quwa Al-Jawiya won the league title with a total of 23 points, and they also won the regional Iraq FA Baghdad Cup knockout tournament in the same season, led by coach Abdelilah Mohammed Hassan.

From the 1974–75 season, the competition was replaced by the Iraqi National Clubs League which was only open to clubs and not institute-representative teams.

== Name changes ==
- Al-Mushat renamed to Quwat Al-Nasr.

== Regional qualifiers ==
To decide which six teams from other provinces would participate alongside the eight teams from the 1972–73 Iraq Central FA First Division, 14 teams were split into three groups with the top two in each group qualifying for the final league competition. The qualifying matches were played from 24–31 August 1973 in the cities of Erbil, Babil and Basra. The six teams that qualified were Al-Minaa, Al-Samawa, Babil, Shortat Erbil, Shortat Sulaymaniya and Al-Rafidain.

== League table ==
Pos	Team	Pld	W	PW	L	GF	GA	GD	Pts	Qualification or relegation
1	Al-Quwa Al-Jawiya	14	11	1	2	35	15	+20	23	League Champions
2	Aliyat Al-Shorta	14	10	0	4	23	16	+7	20	
3	Al-Minaa	14	8	3	3	27	9	+18	19	
4	Quwat Al-Nasr	14	7	4	3	27	14	+13	18	
5	Kahrabaa Al-Wusta	14	8	1	5	31	21	+10	17	
6	Quwat Salahaddin	14	7	3	4	18	8	+10	17	
7	Al-Sikak Al-Hadeed	14	8	0	6	30	22	+8	16	
8	Shortat Al-Najda	14	8	0	6	25	19	+6	16	
9	Al-Bareed wal-Barq	14	6	1	7	19	15	+4	13	
10	Al-Samawa	14	5	2	7	14	14	0	12	
11	Maslahat Naqil Al-Rukab	14	2	3	9	11	19	−8	7	Relegated to Iraqi National Second Division (Note: The IFA decided to relegate one team from Baghdad (Maslahat Naqil Al-Rukab as the lowest-placed Baghdad team) and one team from outside Baghdad (Shortat Sulaymaniya due to their withdrawal from several matches). Three teams were to be promoted in their place (Kuliyat Al-Shorta, Isalat Al-Mai and Al-Quwa Al-Bahriya) to form a 16-team league for the following season. However, the IFA later decided to form a new league of clubs which led to several changes in the make-up of the participating teams.)
12	Shortat Sulaymaniya	14	2	0	12	4	18	−14	4	Relegated to Iraqi National Second Division
13	Babil	14	2	0	12	10	31	−21	4	
14	Shortat Erbil	14	1	1	12	8	26	−18	3	
15	Al-Rafidain	14	1	0	13	7	42	−35	2	

Source: Anwiyah Archive

== Results ==
Home \ Away	BAR	ASH	KAH	MIN	QWJ	RAF	SMA	SIK	BAB	MAS	QWN	QSD	SHN	SHS	SHE
Al-Bareed wal-Barq		1–2		0–1		4–0		2–3		3–1		0–0 (Note: Al-Bareed wal-Barq won 7–6 on penalties.)		1–0	
Aliyat Al-Shorta			0–2		5–2		1–0		1–0		2–2 (Note: Quwat Al-Nasr won 5–4 on penalties.)		2–0		1–0
Kahrabaa Al-Wusta	1–2			1–3		5–1		4–3		1–0		0–0 (Note: Quwat Salahaddin won 5–4 on penalties.)		3–1	
Al-Minaa		2–3			0–2		2–1		5–0		3–1		2–0		0–0 (Note: Al-Minaa won 4–2 on penalties.)
Al-Quwa Al-Jawiya	1–0		4–5			4–0		3–1		2–1		2–0		1–0 (Note: Al-Quwa Al-Jawiya were awarded a 1–0 win due to the withdrawal of Shortat Sulaymaniya.)	
Al-Rafidain		1–3		0–5			0–1		1–2		0–8		3–6		0–1 (Note: The match originally finished as a 2–0 win for Al-Rafidain, but was awarded as a 1–0 win for Shortat Erbil due to Al-Rafidain violating tournament rules.)
Al-Samawa	1–1 (Note: Al-Samawa won 5–4 on penalties.)		4–1		0–1			1–1 (Note: Al-Samawa won 5–4 on penalties.)		2–0		0–3		1–0 (Note: Al-Samawa were awarded a 1–0 win due to the withdrawal of Shortat Sulaymaniya.)	
Al-Sikak Al-Hadeed		3–0		0–0 (Note: Al-Minaa won 5–4 on penalties.)		1–0			3–2		3–5		4–2		4–0
Babil	1–2		0–4		1–4		2–1			1–2		0–3		0–1	
Maslahat Naqil Al-Rukab		0–1		1–1 (Note: Al-Minaa won 4–3 on penalties.)		1–0 (Note: The match originally finished as a 2–2 draw with Maslahat Naqil Al-Rukab winning 5–3 on penalties, but was awarded as a 1–0 win for Maslahat Naqil Al-Rukab due to Al-Rafidain violating tournament rules.)		1–2			1–1 (Note: Quwat Al-Nasr won 5–4 on penalties.)		1–3		1–1 (Note: Maslahat Naqil Al-Rukab won 4–3 on penalties.)
Quwat Al-Nasr	1–0		1–0		1–3		0–0 (Note: Quwat Al-Nasr won 4–2 on penalties.)		2–0			1–1 (Note: Quwat Salahaddin won 5–4 on penalties.)		2–0	
Quwat Salahaddin		3–1		0–0 (Note: Quwat Salahaddin won 4–3 on penalties.)		1–0		2–1		0–0 (Note: Maslahat Naqil Al-Rukab won 5–4 on penalties.)			1–2		2–1
Shortat Al-Najda	2–1		1–3		1–1 (Note: Al-Quwa Al-Jawiya won 5–3 on penalties.)		2–0		1–0 (Note: The match originally finished as a 1–1 draw with Babil winning 4–2 on penalties, but was awarded as a 1–0 win for Shortat Al-Najda due to Babil violating tournament rules.)		0–0 (Note: Quwat Al-Nasr won 5–4 on penalties.)			1–0	
Shortat Sulaymaniya		0–1 (Note: Aliyat Al-Shorta were awarded a 1–0 win due to the withdrawal of Shortat Sulaymaniya.)		0–3		0–1 (Note: The match originally finished as a 1–0 win for Shortat Sulaymaniya, but was awarded as a 1–0 win for Al-Rafidain due to Shortat Sulaymaniya withdrawing from several previous matches in the league.)		0–1 (Note: Al-Sikak Al-Hadeed were awarded a 1–0 win due to the withdrawal of Shortat Sulaymaniya.)		1–1 (Note: Maslahat Naqil Al-Rukab won 5–4 on penalties.)		0–2			1–0
Shortat Erbil	1–2		1–1 (Note: Kahrabaa Al-Wusta won 5–4 on penalties.)		0–5		0–2		1–1 (Note: Shortat Erbil won 5–4 on penalties.)		1–2		1–4		

Source: Anwiyah Archive
Legend: Blue = home team win; Yellow = draw; Red = away team win.

== Top goalscorers ==
Pos	Scorer	Goals	Team
1	Zahrawi Jaber	13	Shortat Al-Najda
1	Ammo Yousif	13	Al-Quwa Al-Jawiya
