= Al-Muwasalat SC =

Iraqi football club

- Full name: Al-Muwasalat Sports Club
- Founded: 18 August 1974
- Dissolved: 1975; 50 years ago
- Final season; 1974–75: Iraqi National League, 3rd
Home colours	Away colours

Al-Muwasalat Sports Club (Arabic: نادي المواصلات الرياضي) was a sports club based in Baghdad, Iraq.

== History ==
=== In Premier League ===
On 18 August 1974, the Iraq Football Association decided to form the Iraqi National Clubs League as the first nationwide league of clubs in the country. It was decided that two top-flight teams, Al-Minaa and Al-Bareed, would be merged to form Al-Muwasalat to compete in the inaugural season of the new league. Al-Minaa were a team based in Basra, while Al-Bareed were based in Baghdad, and despite the two teams being merged, players from the two teams would continue to train separately in their respective cities and would only meet on the day of a game.

Al-Muwasalat finished in third place in 1974–75 but it was decided that the club would be dissolved after just one season. Al-Minaa were reinstated in place of Al-Muwasalat in the Iraqi top-flight, while Al-Bareed were consigned to competing in non-IFA competitions until 1992 when they were registered as a club and re-entered the Iraqi football pyramid.
