= Al-Ittihad SC (Iraq) =

Iraqi football club

- Full name: Al-Ittihad Sport Club
- Nickname: Al-Malaki (The Royal)
- Founded: 1937; 89 years ago
- Ground: Al-Ittihad stadium
- Chairman: Sabah Mahdi Karim
- League: Iraqi Third Division League
Home colours	Away colours

Al-Ittihad Sport Club (Arabic: نادي الاتحاد الرياضي, lit. 'Union Club'), is an Iraqi football team based in Al-Ashar, Basra, that plays in Iraqi Third Division League.

== History ==
=== Foundation and early years ===
Al-Ittihad was founded in 1937 in the Al-Bachari district, and it was the first administrative body headed by Nadhum Majeed. In 1940, Tawfiq Al-Ainachi assumed the presidency of the club. The club's activities stopped at the outbreak of World War II. In 1945, the club resumed activity, and moved to a new location in the Al-Saee district.

=== Prince's patronage and "Royal" nickname ===
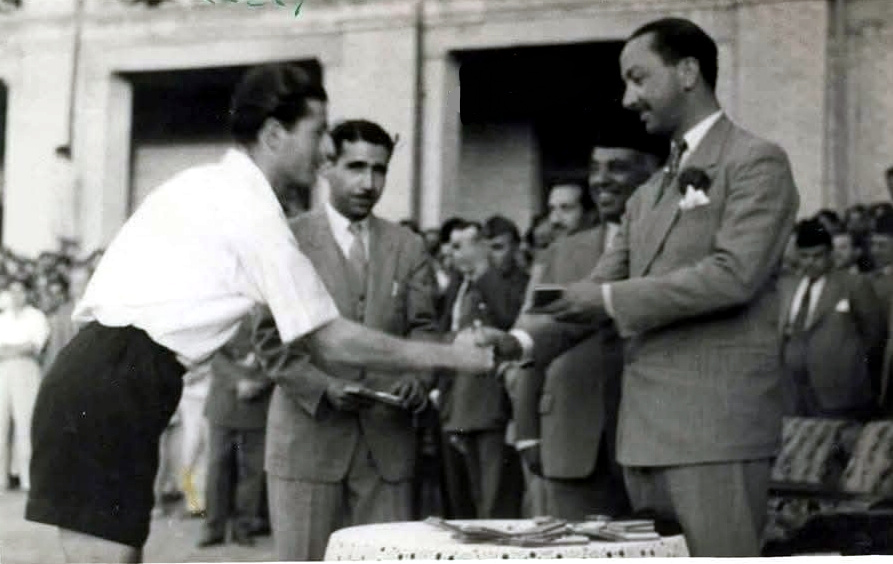
Prince Abd al-Ilah awards medal to Al-Ittihad player Saeed Easho in 1949.

In the 1940s, the club was receiving direct support from Prince Abd al-Ilah. Prince Abd al-Ilah's encouragement was the first motive for the club's activity, as he visited Basra on every occasion, he came to the stadium to enjoy one of the football matches that the club was running. He also donated a silver cup to the football club bearing his name in 1947, and on April 22, 1949, the prince spent an entire day in the club's hospitality to supervise himself the activities of the club teams, and the club's name was changed to the Al-Ittihad Al-Malaki "Royal" Sport Club. At the end of the 1940s and the beginning of the 1950s, the president of the club was Sami Al-Hilali, who issued the first sports newspaper in Basra in September 1950 under the name of Al-Ittihad Sports Newspaper, he was an influential figure, and at that time he was communicating with club administrations in neighboring countries to conduct friendly matches and hold sporting events.

=== In FA Basra Premier League ===
Al-Ittihad has participated in the Iraq FA Basra Premier League (the top division) since its inception in 1948. The 1949–50 season was the second season of League organised by the Basra branch of the Iraq Football Association. The tournament began on 19 October 1949, and the regular season ended in November 1949 with Sharikat Naft Al-Basra and Al-Ittihad qualifying for the final. Al-Ittihad lost 5–1 in the final and took second place.

=== In Premier League ===
Al-Ittihad played in the Iraqi Premier League for the first time in its history in the 1976–77 season, and it came in sixth place as its best position in the history of the tournament, as it played 11 matches, winning 4, drawing 3 and losing 4 of them, and the team's player Abbas Fadhel won the league's top scorer title with six goals, in conjunction with four other players. In the 1977–78 season, the team finished the league in 11th place, as it played 13 matches, won 3, drew 3, and lost 7 of them. In the 1978–79 season, the team finished in 12th place after playing 12 matches, winning 2 matches, drawing 3 and losing 7 of them, and relegated to the Iraqi First Division League. The club played in Iraqi First Division League and won this championship in 1980–81 season and promoted in the Iraqi Premier League again and played in 1981–82 season, however the team fell to the bottom of the league standings, after playing 22 matches, winning only one match, drawing 2 and losing 19 of them, and relegated back to the Iraqi First Division League.

== President assassination ==
On January 18, 2005, unidentified armed persons assassinated the club's president, Alaa Hamid Nasih in Basra, and then escaped without being arrested.

== Famous players ==
- (Iraq) Karim Allawi
- (Iraq) Saeed Easho
- (Iraq) Mejbil Jwayed
- (Iraq) Hassan Ali Funjan
- (Iraq) Hassan Muwla
- (Iraq) Abdul Karim Jassim

== Honours ==
=== National ===
- Iraqi Premier Division League (second tier)
  - Winners (2): 1975–76, 1980–81

=== Regional ===
- Iraq FA Basra Premier League (top tier)
  - Runners-up (1): 1949–50

== Al-Ittihad Women ==
Al-Ittihad Club is the first club in Basra that was concerned with the women's sports movement. In 1957, the first woman was elected as a member of the administrative board of the club, Saadiya Abdul Wahed Al-Farhan. Mondays were designated for women to engage in sports activities, and this led to the formation of women's teams, so that The women's athletics team participated in the national championship in 1975.
