= Mohammed Abdul Hussein =

Iraqi footballer (born 1965)

Personal information
- Full name: Mohammed Abdul Hussein Sabeeh
- Date of birth: 1 July 1965 (age 61)
- Place of birth: Basra, Iraq
- Position: Forward

Team information
- Current team: Al-Mina'a-U19 (Manager)

Youth career
- 1985–1987: Al-Mina'a

Senior career*
| Years | Team | Apps | (Gls) |
| 1987–1993 | Al-Mina'a | | |
| 1993–1994 | Al-Zawra'a | 50 | (9) |
| 1994–1996 | Racing Beirut | 22 | (11) |
| 1996–1997 | Al-Mina'a | | |
| 1997–1998 | Shabab Al-Sahel | | (16) |
| 1998–2000 | Hekmeh | | |
| 2000–2001 | Al-Mina'a | | |

Managerial career
- 2001–2007: Al-Mina'a U19
- 2007–2008: Salam Zgharta
- 2010–: Al-Mina'a U19
- * Club domestic league appearances and goals

Mohammed Abdul Hussein (Arabic: محمد عبد الحسين; born 1 July 1965) is an Iraqi former footballer who played as a forward. He won the title of best player in Iraqi Premier League in 1992–93 season. He was the first footballer from Basra turn professional outside Iraq, He is currently working as coach of the youth team Al-Mina'a.

== Honors ==
=== Clubs ===
Al-Zawra'a

- 1994 Iraqi Premier League: Champion
- 1994 Iraq FA Cup: Champion

=== Club ===
Al-Minaa U19

- Iraqi U19 Premier League: 2021–22, 2024–25
- Paris World Games, Football U19: 2017

=== Individual ===
- 1988 Tahrir Al-Faw Championship joint top-scorer (5 goals).
- 1992–93 Iraqi National League The best player title.
