= 1948–49 Iraq FA Kirkuk League =

Iraq FA Kirkuk Premier League 1948–1949 season

Iraq FA Kirkuk Premier League
- Season: 1948–49
- Champions: Al-Dhahab Al-Aswad (1st title)
- Relegated: Armenian Shant; Al-Anakib; Ittihad Kirkuk

The 1948–49 Iraq FA Kirkuk League was the first season of the Iraq FA Kirkuk Premier League (the top division of football in Kirkuk from 1948 to 1973) organised by the Kirkuk branch of the Iraq Football Association. It started in November 1948 and finished in March 1949.

In the last round of the competition, Al-Dhahab Al-Aswad defeated Al-Firqa Al-Thaniya to effectively seal the title, since it meant Al-Athoreen needed to defeat Armenian Relief Corps by an unrealistic scoreline to overtake them on goal average (goals scored divided by goals conceded). Al-Athoreen drew their game meaning that Al-Dhahab Al-Aswad were crowned inaugural Iraq FA Kirkuk League champions.

== League table ==
The last two results of the season (Al-Nahl IPC v. Al-Firqa Al-Thaniya and Ittihad Kirkuk v. Al-Madaris) are not available.

Pos	Team	Pld	W	D	L	GF	GA	GAv	Pts	Qualification or relegation
1	Al-Dhahab Al-Aswad	10	9	0	1	41	6	6.833	18	League Champions
2	Al-Athoreen	10	8	1	1	50	14	3.571	17	
3	Al-Firqa Al-Thaniya	9	7	0	2	24	15	1.600	14	
4	Armenian Relief Corps	10	5	1	4	27	12	2.250	11	
5	Al-Nahl IPC	9	4	2	3	31	30	1.033	10	
6	Al-Dababir IPC	10	5	0	5	21	21	1.000	10	
7	Al-Madaris	9	4	0	5	12	17	0.706	8	
8	Al-Qamar Al-Ahmar	10	3	2	5	19	31	0.613	8	
9	Armenian Shant	10	2	2	6	11	20	0.550	6	Relegated to Iraq FA Kirkuk Second Division
10	Al-Anakib	10	2	0	8	8	29	0.276	4	Relegated to Iraq FA Kirkuk Second Division
11	Ittihad Kirkuk	9	0	0	9	10	59	0.169	0	Relegated to Iraq FA Kirkuk Second Division
12	Nusoor Al-Athori (Note: Nusoor Al-Athori withdrew after 10 games (3 wins, 1 draw, 6 losses, 14 goals scored, 31 goals conceded, 7 points) and their results were annulled after they failed to turn up for a game against Al-Madaris.)	0	0	0	0	0	0	—	0	
13	Wimpey's (Note: Wimpey's withdrew after 7 games (0 wins, 0 draws, 7 losses, 2 goals scored, 68 goals conceded, 0 points) and their results were annulled.)	0	0	0	0	0	0	—	0	

Source: The Iraq Times

== Known results ==
Home \ Away	ANK	ATH	DAB	DHA	FTN	MAD	NHL	QAM	ARC	ASH	ITT	NSR	WIM
Al-Anakib			1–3					1–3			4–1		– (Note: Wimpey's' results against Al-Dhahab Al-Aswad (12–0 loss), Al-Dababir IPC (5–2 loss), Nusoor Al-Athori (5–0 loss), Al-Anakib (9–0 loss), Armenian Relief Corps (11–0 loss), Al-Firqa Al-Thaniya (11–0 loss) and Al-Madaris (15–0 loss) were annulled after their withdrawal from the league.)
Al-Athoreen	5–0			0–3	7–1				1–1			– (Note: Nusoor Al-Athori's results against Al-Dhahab Al-Aswad (4–0 loss), Al-Nahl IPC (4–2 loss), Al-Anakib (3–2 win), Ittihad Kirkuk (4–0 win), Al-Qamar Al-Ahmar (2–0 win), Armenian Shant (3–1 loss), Al-Dababir IPC (2–2 draw), Al-Firqa Al-Thaniya (4–0 loss), Al-Athoreen (12–0 loss) and Al-Madaris (counted as a loss due to not turning up for the game) were annulled after their withdrawal from the league.)	
Al-Dababir IPC				1–0	2–3	– (Note: The Al-Dababir IPC–Al-Madaris match was counted as a win for Al-Madaris and a loss for Al-Dababir IPC as Al-Dababir IPC did not turn up for the game.)		4–3		3–0	5–1	–	–
Al-Dhahab Al-Aswad									2–1		9–1	–	
Al-Firqa Al-Thaniya				1–4								–	–
Al-Madaris	2–0			1–3									
Al-Nahl IPC	3–1	3–6		1–9				4–4		– (Note: The Al-Nahl IPC–Armenian Shant match ended in a draw.)			
Al-Qamar Al-Ahmar					0–5				2–1	0–0		–	
Armenian Relief Corps					– (Note: The Armenian Relief Corps–Al-Firqa Al-Thaniya match was counted as a win for Al-Firqa Al-Thaniya and a loss for Armenian Relief Corps as Armenian Relief Corps did not turn up for the game.)	1–5					4–0		
Armenian Shant	0–1					2–1					5–1	–	
Ittihad Kirkuk													
Nusoor Al-Athori	–					–	–				–		
Wimpey's				–		–			–			–	

Source: The Iraq Times
Legend: Blue = home team win; Yellow = draw; Red = away team win.
