= Iraq FA Kirkuk Premier League =

Iraq FA Kirkuk Premier League Iraq FA Kirkuk First Division League
- Founded: 1948
- Folded: 1973
- Country: Iraq
- Level on pyramid: 1
- Relegation to: Iraq FA Kirkuk Second Division League
- Domestic cup(s): Iraq FA Cup

The Iraq FA Kirkuk Premier League (Arabic: دوري الاتحاد العراقي لمنطقة كركوك) was the top-level division of football in Kirkuk between 1948 and 1973. It was controlled by the Kirkuk branch of the Iraq Football Association and was one of several regional league championships played in Iraq at the time, with others including the Baghdad, Basra and Mosul leagues. The first champions of the competition were Al-Dhahab Al-Aswad, who won the title in both the 1948–49 and 1949–50 seasons.

The regional leagues folded in 1973 and were replaced by the Iraqi National First Division League.

== List of champions ==
Season	Champion	Runner-up
1948–49	Al-Dhahab Al-Aswad	Al-Athoreen
1949–50	Al-Dhahab Al-Aswad	Al-Madaris
1950–73	Information not available	

== See also ==
- Iraq Central FA Premier League
- Iraq FA Basra Premier League
- Iraqi National First Division
- Iraq Stars League
- Iraqi Women's Football League
