= Shaker Ismail =

Iraqi footballer (born 1927)

Personal information
- Full name: Shaker Ismail
- Date of birth: 1 July 1927
- Place of birth: Basra, Iraq
- Position: Forward

Senior career*
Years	Team	Apps	(Gls)
- Al-Mina'a

International career
1951	Iraq		
- * Club domestic league appearances and goals

Shaker Ismail (Arabic: شَاكِر إِسْمَاعِيل, born 1 July 1927) is an Iraqi former international football player, who was one of the first players to play in first Iraq national football team. He also played for Al-Minaa.

== International career ==
Ismail played against Iraq in April 1951 in a friendly match between Iraq national football team, and Basra Select XI. The Basra XI was composed of 10 players from Al-Minaa and Ismail from Sharikat Naft Al-Basra. Two of Basra’s players, Ismail and Karim Allawi, caught the eye of the coach Dhia Habib and were added to the squad, bound for Turkey.

In April 1951, Ismail started playing for the first Iraq national football team, He was called by coach Dhia Habib to play in the first international friendly in the history of Iraqi football. On 6 May 1951, Ismail played his first international against Turkey B in Turkey, which ended 7–0 for Turkey B.

== Honours ==
=== Club ===
- Iraq FA Cup
  - Winner 1948–49 with Sharikat Naft Al-Basra
