= Hassan Ali Funjan =

Iraqi association football player

Hassan Ali
Personal information
- Full name: Hassan Ali Funjan
- Date of birth: 1 January 1959 (age 67)
- Place of birth: Iraq
- Position: Defender

Senior career*
Years	Team	Apps	(Gls)
1976-1980	Al-Ittihad		
1980-1982	Al-Talaba		
1982-1983	Salahaddin		
1983-1986	Al-Jaish		

International career
1981–1983	Iraq		
- * Club domestic league appearances and goals

Hassan Ali (born 1 January 1959) is a former Iraqi football defender who played for Iraq at the 1982 Asian Games.

Hassan played for Iraq between 1981 and 1983.
