= 1962–63 Iraq FA Basra First Division =

Iraq FA Basra Premier League
- Season: 1962–63
- Champions: Al-Minaa

The 1962–63 Iraq FA Basra First Division League (the top division of football in Basra) was organised by the Basra branch of the Iraq Football Association. Basra's teams were split into three divisions for the season. The First Division began on 9 October 1962, and Al-Minaa topped the table ahead of their B team to secure the league title.

== League table ==
Pos	Team	Pld	W	D	L	GF	GA	GAv	Pts	Qualification
1	Al-Minaa	4	3	1	0	8	1	8.000	7	League Champions
2	Al-Minaa B	4	2	2	0	5	2	2.500	6	
3	Sharikat Naft Al-Basra	4	2	0	2	6	8	0.750	4	
4	Al-Junoob	4	1	0	3	9	12	0.750	2	
5	Shortat Al-Basra	4	0	1	3	5	10	0.500	1	

Source: Al-Daqouti Archive

== Results ==
Home \ Away	MNA	MNB	SNB	JUN	SHR
Al-Minaa		0–0		4–0	
Al-Minaa B			2–0		1–1
Sharikat Naft Al-Basra	0–2			4–3	
Al-Junoob		1–2			5–2
Shortat Al-Basra	1–2		1–2		

Source: The Iraq Times
Legend: Blue = home team win; Yellow = draw; Red = away team win.
