= Sulaiman Almas =

Qatari footballer (birthdate unknown)

Personal information
- Full name: Sulaiman Almas
- Date of birth: 1950 (age 75–76)
- Place of birth: Doha, Qatar
- Position: Striker

Senior career*
Years	Team	Apps	(Gls)
1969–1980	Al-Esteqlal		

International career
1970–1979	Qatar		
- * Club domestic league appearances and goals

Sulaiman Almas alternatively known as Salman Al-mas, (Arabic: سليمان الماس), is a former Qatari football footballer who played for Al-Esteqlal and represented the Qatar national team at the Gulf Cup in the 1970s.

== Club career ==
Almas played for Al-Esteqlal in the 1970s, winning several Qatari League titles.

== International career ==
Almas played from 1970 till 1979, he first participated in the 1970 Gulf Cup, scoring a goal against Kuwait in a 2–4 defeat. In the 1976 Gulf Cup, he scored a spectacular header against arch-rivals Saudi Arabia to enable Qatar to win the game on home soil. In the same tournament, he scored against United Arab Emirates and Oman. Almas last played for Qatar at the 1979 Gulf Cup.

== Honours ==
- Qatari League:
  - Winners (2+):
- Emir Cup
  - Winners (2+):
