= 4th Arabian Gulf Cup =

1976 football competition held in Qatar

1976 Arabian Gulf Cup
دورة كأس الخليج العربي الرابعة (in Arabic)

Tournament details
- Host country: Qatar
- Dates: 26 March – 15 April
- Teams: 7
- Venue: 1 (in 1 host city)

Final positions
- Champions: Kuwait (4th title)
- Runners-up: Iraq
- Third place: Qatar
- Fourth place: Bahrain

Tournament statistics
- Matches played: 22
- Goals scored: 84 (3.82 per match)
- Top scorer: (Kuwait) Jasem Yaqoub (9 goals)
- Best player: (Iraq) Ali Kadhim
- Best goalkeeper: (Bahrain) Hamood Sultan

The 4th Arabian Gulf Cup (Arabic: دورة كأس الخليج العربي الرابعة) was the fourth international association football championship for the national teams of the Arabian Peninsula and bordering the Persian Gulf. Hosted by Qatar, the competition ran from 26 March to 15 April 1976 and was contested by the national teams of Bahrain, Iraq, Kuwait, Oman, Qatar, Saudi Arabia and the United Arab Emirates.

Played as a round-robin tournament, a play-off was required to decide the winners after three-time defending champions Kuwait and Iraq finished on equal points. Abdulaziz Al-Anberi scored a hat-trick in the championship play-off as Kuwait defeated Iraq 4–2.

== Background ==
The first edition of the biennial Arabian Gulf Cup was held in Isa Town, Bahrain in 1970. Kuwait were three-time defeanding champions after winning the first three editions of the competition in 1970, 1972 and 1974.

== Format ==
The seven teams contested a single round robin group. After every team had played each other, the team with the most points would be the winner.

=== Participants ===
- Bahrain
- Iraq
- Kuwait
- Oman
- Qatar
- Saudi Arabia
- United Arab Emirates

== Venue ==
All matches were played at the Khalifa Sports City Stadium in Doha, Qatar.

4th Arabian Gulf Cup is located in Qatar	Doha
4th Arabian Gulf Cup is located in Qatar	Khalifa Sports City Stadium
4th Arabian Gulf Cup is located in Qatar	Capacity: 20,000

== Group stage ==
As Kuwait and Iraq finished on equal points and goal difference, a play-off was arranged for 15 April 1976 to determine the winner of the competition. Hosts Qatar finished third, one point behind the top two.

=== Table ===
Team	Pld	W	D	L	GF	GA	GD	Pts
Kuwait	6	4	2	0	22	5	+17	10
Iraq	6	4	2	0	21	4	+17	10
Qatar	6	4	1	1	11	6	+5	9
Bahrain	6	3	0	3	9	15	−6	6
Saudi Arabia	6	2	0	4	8	14	−6	4
United Arab Emirates	6	0	2	4	4	13	−9	2
Oman	6	0	1	5	3	21	−18	1

=== Matches ===
26 March 1976
15:25

Qatar	1–0	Saudi Arabia
Almas 20'

Khalifa Sports City Stadium, Doha
Referee: Sobhi Adeeb (Iraq)
27 March 1976
15:25

Iraq	4–0	Oman
Hassan 33'; Kadhim 68', 80'; Nasser 69' (o.g.)

Khalifa Sports City Stadium, Doha
Referee: Abdulrahman Al-Daham (Saudi Arabia)
27 March 1976
17:30

Bahrain	3–2	United Arab Emirates
Buhram 49', 64'; Al-Dawoodi 80'		Abdullah 73'; Boshanain 88'

Khalifa Sports City Stadium, Doha
Referee: Abdulrahman Al-Bakr (Kuwait)

28 March 1976
15:25

Kuwait	4–0	Qatar
Yaqoub 25'; Al-Dakhil 37', 74'; Al-Anberi 46'

Khalifa Sports City Stadium, Doha
Referee: Sobhi Adeeb (Iraq)
29 March 1976
15:25

Saudi Arabia	2–0	United Arab Emirates
Sobhi 22' (pen.); Al-Mughnem 55'

Khalifa Sports City Stadium, Doha
Referee: Abdulghaffar Al-Alwi (Bahrain)
29 March 1976
17:30

Iraq	4–1	Bahrain
Waal 11'; Hassan 23'; Abdul-Jalil 50'; Kadhim 65'		Zowayed 39' (pen.)

Khalifa Sports City Stadium, Doha
Referee: Abdulrahman Al-Bakr (Kuwait)

31 March 1976
15:25

Kuwait	8–0	Oman
Al-Dakhil 16', 74'; Mohammed 17'; Yaqoub 22' (pen.), 33', 49', 59'; Ibrahim 87'

Khalifa Sports City Stadium, Doha
Referee: Taleb Ballan (Qatar)
1 April 1976
15:25

Iraq	7–1	Saudi Arabia
Waal 3'; Abdul-Jalil 6'; Hassan 25'; Kadhim 45', 60', 68'; Subhi 89'		Suroor 82'

Khalifa Sports City Stadium, Doha
Referee: Hédi Saoudi (Tunisia)
1 April 1976
17:30

Qatar	3–1	United Arab Emirates
Muftah 1'; Al-Hajri 2'; Almas 29'		Abdulrahman 59'

Khalifa Sports City Stadium, Doha
Referee: Abdulrahman Al-Bakr (Kuwait)

2 April 1976
15:25

Bahrain	1–0	Oman
Buhram 60'

Khalifa Sports City Stadium, Doha
Referee: Sobhi Adeeb (Iraq)
3 April 1976
15:25

Qatar	0–0	Iraq

Khalifa Sports City Stadium, Doha
Referee: Hédi Saoudi (Tunisia)
3 April 1976
17:30

Kuwait	0–0	United Arab Emirates

Khalifa Sports City Stadium, Doha
Referee: Mubarak Waleed (Qatar)

4 April 1976
15:25

Saudi Arabia	3–1	Oman
Al-Mughnem 3'; Suroor 19'; Khalifa 82'		Al-Alawi 5'

Khalifa Sports City Stadium, Doha
Referee: Abbas Hassan (United Arab Emirates)
6 April 1976
15:25

Kuwait	5–2	Bahrain
Yaqoub 5' (pen.); Al-Anberi 15', 43'; Bohamoud 68'; Al-Dakhil 90'		Almas 40'; Shuwaier 42'

Khalifa Sports City Stadium, Doha
Referee: Hédi Saoudi (Tunisia)
6 April 1976
17:30

Iraq	4–0	United Arab Emirates
Hussein 11'; Kadhim 34' (pen.); Abdul-Jalil 43'; Fartous 44'

Khalifa Sports City Stadium, Doha
Referee: Abdelkader Oweis (Algeria)

7 April 1976
15:25

Qatar	4–1	Oman
Muftah 1', 2'; Almas 3'; Omar 49'		Harib 43'

Khalifa Sports City Stadium, Doha
Referee: Sobhi Adeeb (Iraq)
8 April 1976
17:30

Kuwait	2–2	Iraq
Yaqoub 55'; Al-Dakhil 56'		Abdul-Jalil 46'; Kadhim 49'

Khalifa Sports City Stadium, Doha
Referee: Abdelkader Oweis (Algeria)
8 April 1976
20:00

Bahrain	2–1	Saudi Arabia
Bashir 51'; Buhram 80'		Naseeb 11'

Khalifa Sports City Stadium, Doha
Referee: Sabahattin Ladikli (Turkey)

10 April 1976
17:30

Qatar	3–0	Bahrain
Muftah 56', 57'; Omar 90'

Khalifa Sports City Stadium, Doha
Referee: Sobhi Adeeb (Iraq)
10 April 1976
20:00

United Arab Emirates	1–1	Oman
Mubarak 6'		Al-Alawi 23' (pen.)

Khalifa Sports City Stadium, Doha
Referee: Mubarak Waleed (Qatar)
11 April 1976
20:00

Kuwait	3–1	Saudi Arabia
Al-Dakhil 10', 27'; Yaqoub 63'		Suroor 46'

Khalifa Sports City Stadium, Doha
Referee: Abdelkader Oweis (Algeria)

== Championship play-off ==
Ahmed Subhi scored a brace for Iraq but a hat-trick from Abdulaziz Al-Anberi and a goal from Jasem Yaqoub helped Kuwait defeat Iraq 4–2 to win the competition.

15 April 1976
15:25

Kuwait	4–2	Iraq
Al-Anberi 8', 25', 85'; Yaqoub 32'		Subhi 9', 50'

Khalifa Sports City Stadium, Doha
Referee: Hédi Saoudi (Tunisia)

== Goalscorers ==
There were 84 goals scored in 22 matches, for an average of 3.82 goals per match.

9 goals

- (Kuwait) Jasem Yaqoub

8 goals

- (Iraq) Ali Kadhim
- (Kuwait) Faisal Al-Dakhil

6 goals

- (Kuwait) Abdulaziz Al-Anberi

5 goals

- (Qatar) Mansour Muftah

4 goals

- (Iraq) Sabah Abdul-Jalil
- (Bahrain) Mohammed Buhram

3 goals

- (Iraq) Falah Hassan
- (Iraq) Ahmed Subhi
- (Qatar) Sulaiman Almas
- (Saudi Arabia) Khaled Suroor

2 goals

- (Iraq) Kadhim Waal
- (Qatar) Ahmed Omar
- (Saudi Arabia) Mohammed Al-Mughnem

1 goal

- (Bahrain) Jassem Al-Dawoodi
- (Bahrain) Jawhar Almas
- (Bahrain) Sultan Bashir
- (Bahrain) Khalil Shuwaier
- (Bahrain) Ibrahim Zowayed
- (Iraq) Ali Hussein Mahmoud
- (Iraq) Mejbel Fartous
- (Kuwait) Saud Bohamoud
- (Kuwait) Farouq Ibrahim
- (Kuwait) Hussain Mohammed
- (Oman) Mubarak Al-Alawi
- (Oman) Muslem Al-Alawi
- (Oman) Hamad Harib
- (Qatar) Saif Al-Hajri
- (Saudi Arabia) Eissa Khalifa
- (Saudi Arabia) Sultan bin Naseeb
- (Saudi Arabia) Hamed Sobhi
- (United Arab Emirates) Jassem Abdullah
- (United Arab Emirates) Rajab Abdulrahman
- (United Arab Emirates) Salem Boshanain
- (United Arab Emirates) Awadh Mubarak

1 own goal

- (Oman) Ali Nasser (against Iraq)

== Awards ==
Player of the Tournament

- (Iraq) Ali Kadhim

Top Scorer

- (Kuwait) Jasem Yaqoub (9 goals)

Goalkeeper of the Tournament

- (Bahrain) Hamood Sultan
