= 1949–50 Iraq FA Kirkuk First Division =

Iraq FA Kirkuk Premier League
- Season: 1949–50
- Champions: Al-Dhahab Al-Aswad (2nd title)

The 1949–50 Iraq FA Kirkuk First Division League was the second season of the Iraq FA Kirkuk Premier League (the top division of football in Kirkuk from 1948 to 1973) organised by the Kirkuk branch of the Iraq Football Association. Unlike the previous season, Kirkuk's teams were split into two divisions from this season with seven teams in the top-flight and eight teams in the second-tier. The First Division started on the weekend of 5–6 November 1949, and Al-Dhahab Al-Aswad retained the league title with five victories and one defeat. The number of teams in the First Division was increased to nine for the 1950–51 season.

== League table ==
The outcome of the Armenian Relief Corps v. Al-Firqa Al-Thaniya match is not available.

Pos	Team	Pld	W	D	L	GF	GA	GAv	Pts	Qualification
1	Al-Dhahab Al-Aswad	6	5	0	1	30	9	3.333	10	League Champions
2	Al-Madaris	6	3	2	1	?	?	—	8	
3	Al-Huqool	6	3	2	1	20	16	1.250	8	
4	Shabab Faisal	6	2	1	3	10	12	0.833	5	
5	Armenian Relief Corps	5	2	0	3	?	?	—	4	
6	Al-Firqa Al-Thaniya	5	1	1	3	?	?	—	3	
7	Nusoor Al-Athori	6	1	0	5	5	32	0.156	2	

Source: The Iraq Times

== Results ==
Home \ Away	DHA	FTN	HQL	MAD	ARC	NUS	SHF
Al-Dhahab Al-Aswad				3–0	3–1		4–2
Al-Firqa Al-Thaniya	1–7					4–0	0–1
Al-Huqool	5–4	1–1		5–5		4–2	
Al-Madaris		– (Note: Al-Madaris won their matches against Al-Firqa Al-Thaniya and Armenian Relief Corps.)				13–0	1–1
Armenian Relief Corps			3–1	–			0–3
Nusoor Al-Athori	0–9				– (Note: The Nusoor Al-Athori–Armenian Relief Corps match was counted as a win for Armenian Relief Corps and a loss for Nusoor Al-Athori as Nusoor Al-Athori did not turn up for the game.)		
Shabab Faisal			1–4			2–3	

Source: The Iraq Times
Legend: Blue = home team win; Yellow = draw; Red = away team win.
