= Shawqi Aboud =

Iraqi football manager

Shawqi Aboud (in Arabic شوقي عبود)
Personal information
- Date of birth: 1927
- Place of birth: Adhamiyah, Iraq
- Date of death: 2008 (aged 80–81)
- Place of death: Baghdad, Iraq

Managerial career
- Years: Team
- 1963-1964, 1968-1969: Al-Quwa Al-Jawiya
- 1965: Iraq national football team
Medal record
Winner	Iraq Central FA Premier League	1963-64
Winner	Iraq Central FA Perseverance Cup	1964
Runner-up	Iraq Central FA Premier League	1968-69

Shawqi Aboud (in Arabic شوقي عبود) (Adhammiya, Iraq 1927 - d. Baghdad 2008) was an Iraqi coach who managed the Iraqi national team on three occasions.

He was born in Adhammiya where his father worked for the Capital Municipality, it was there he first got the taste of sports growing up in Baghdad and playing at the local sports grounds of the area.

In 1954, Shawqi traveled to England to take part in a training course along with Adil Basher. He spent a month in England where he got to know Irish coach William Cook, formerly a professional with Everton and Celtic who joined the Iraq delegation on their return to Baghdad to manage the Iraq army team. Cook spent six months training the Iraq army team at the Sarsink Camp on a wage of only a few Iraqi dinars, where they played a number of friendly games, with Shawqi playing a few matches for Iraq in the outside right position, as well as working as one of Cook’s coaching assistants.

In the mid-Sixties Shawqi Aboud coached Al-Quwa Al-Jawiya and his revolutionary tactical philosophy using the Brazilian 4-2-4 which won the 1958 World Cup and a variation of Bill Nicholson’s 3-3-4 deployed by Tottenham Hotspurs 1961 double winning side saw the Al-Quwa Al-Jawiya lift four trophies over a single season.
