= Abdul Amir Sabri =

Iraqi footballer

Personal information
- Full name: Abdul Amir Sabri Shereda
- Date of birth: 1 July 1964 (age 62)
- Place of birth: Basra, Iraq
- Position: Forward

Youth career
- 1980–1982: Al-Mina'a

Senior career*
Years	Team	Apps	(Gls)
1982–1983	Al-Mina'a		
1983–1984	Salahaddin		
1984–1988	Al-Bahri		
1988–1996	Al-Mina'a		
1996	Pires		
1996–2001	Al-Bahri		

International career
1987	Iraq U23		
1988	Iraq		
- * Club domestic league appearances and goals

Abdul Amir Sabri (Arabic: عبد الأمير صبري; born 1964) is an Iraqi former international football player, who played for Iraq in the 9th Arabian Gulf Cup.

== Honors ==
=== Local ===
Salahaddin

- Iraqi League : 1982–83

=== International ===
Iraq

- Arabian Gulf Cup: 1988
