= Kadhim Waal =

Iraqi association football player

Personal information
- Full name: Kadhim Waal
- Date of birth: 1 January 1951
- Place of birth: Iraq
- Date of death: 19 September 2017 (aged 67)
- Place of death: Baghdad, Iraq
- Position: Forward

Senior career*
Years	Team	Apps	(Gls)
- Al Bareed
- Al-Quwa Al-Jawiya

International career
1975–1976	Iraq		(4)
- * Club domestic league appearances and goals

Kadhim Waal (1 January 1951 – 19 September 2017) was an Iraqi football striker who played for Iraq in the 1976 AFC Asian Cup. He also played for Al-Tayaran. He was the first captain of Iraq U20.

On 19 September 2017, Waal died at the age of 67.

== Career statistics ==
=== International goals ===
Scores and results list Iraq's goal tally first.

No	Date	Venue	Opponent	Score	Result	Competition
1.	28 November 1975	Al-Shaab Stadium, Baghdad	Qatar	3–0	3–0	1976 AFC Asian Cup qualification
2.	29 March 1976	Grand Hamad Stadium, Doha	Bahrain	1–0	4–1	4th Arabian Gulf Cup
3.	1 April 1976	Grand Hamad Stadium, Doha	Saudi Arabia	1–0	7–1	4th Arabian Gulf Cup
4.	6 June 1976	Aryamehr Stadium, Tehran	South Yemen	1–0	1–0	1976 AFC Asian Cup
