= Iraq FA Basra Premier League =

Iraq FA Basra Premier League Iraq FA Basra First Division League
- Founded: 1948
- Folded: 1973
- Country: Iraq
- Level on pyramid: 1
- Relegation to: Iraq FA Basra Second Division League
- Domestic cup(s): Iraq FA Cup
- Most championships: Al-Minaa (15 titles)

The Iraq FA Basra Premier League (Arabic: دوري الاتحاد العراقي لمنطقة البصرة) was the top-level division of football in Basra between 1948 and 1973. It was controlled by the Basra branch of the Iraq Football Association and was one of several regional league championships played in Iraq at the time, with others including the Baghdad, Kirkuk and Mosul leagues. The first champions of the competition were Al-Minaa, who won the title in the 1948–49 season.

The regional leagues folded in 1973 and were replaced by the Iraqi National First Division League. Al-Minaa were the competition's most successful team with 15 titles.

== List of champions ==
Season	Champion	Runner-up
1948–49	Al-Minaa	Sharikat Naft Al-Basra
1949–50	Sharikat Naft Al-Basra	Al-Ittihad
1950–51	Sharikat Naft Al-Basra	Thanawiyat Al-Basra
1951–61	Information not available	
1961	Al-Minaa or Sharikat Naft Al-Basra	
1961–62	Information not available	
1962–63	Al-Minaa	Al-Minaa B
1963–73	Information not available	

== See also ==
- Iraq Central FA Premier League
- Iraq FA Kirkuk Premier League
- Iraqi National First Division
- Iraq Stars League
- Iraqi Women's Football League
