= Hazem Jassam =

Iraqi footballer (born 1949)

Personal information
- Date of birth: 1 July 1949 (age 77)
- Place of birth: Iraq
- Position: Midfielder

Senior career*
| Years | Team | Apps | (Gls) |
| 1967–1980 | Al-Zawraa | | |

International career
| 1969–1975 | Iraq | | |

Managerial career
- 1994: Qatar SC
- 1997: Yemen
- 1997–1999: Yemen
- 2002–2003: Yemen
- 2009–2010: Al-Zawraa
- * Club domestic league appearances and goals

Hazem Jassam (Arabic: حَازِم جَسَام; born 1 July 1949) is an Iraqi professional football player and manager who played for Iraq in the 1972 AFC Asian Cup.

== Career ==
In 1970s Jassam played for the Iraq national team. He was a former captain of Al-Zawra'a SC in the Seventies. He played on position in centre midfield also played on the right wing.

In 1994, he coached Qatar SC. He coached the Yemen national football team for a brief period in 1997. He had a second spell as coach the same year, this time managing the team until 1999. From 2002 to 2003 he again worked as a head coach of Yemen team.

In the 2009–2010 season he led Al-Zawraa.

== Career statistics ==
Scores and results list Iraq's goal tally first.

| No | Date | Venue | Opponent | Score | Result | Competition |
|---|---|---|---|---|---|---|
| 1. | 14 July 1971 | Al-Shaab Stadium, Baghdad | Lebanon | 1–0 | 1–1 | 1972 Olympics qualifiers |
| 2. | 2 September 1974 | Amjadieh Stadium, Tehran | India | 3–0 | 3–0 | 1974 Asian Games |
| 3. | 4 September 1974 | Amjadieh Stadium, Tehran | North Korea | 1–0 | 1–0 | 1974 Asian Games |
| 4. | 9 September 1974 | Amjadieh Stadium, Tehran | South Korea | 1–1 | 1–1 | 1974 Asian Games |
