= Hamood Sultan =

Bahraini footballer

Personal information
- Full name: Hamood Sultan Mathkoor
- Date of birth: 1952 (age 73–74)
- Place of birth: Al Muharraq, Bahrain
- Position: Goalkeeper

Senior career*
Years	Team	Apps	(Gls)
1970–1998	Muharraq Club	270	(7+)

International career
1975–1996	Bahrain	78	(0)
- * Club domestic league appearances and goals

Hamood Sultan Mathkoor (Arabic: حمود سلطان; born 1958, in Muharraq) is a former Bahraini football goalkeeper. He spent his career at Muharraq Club and was a key member of his team's successes in the 1980s and 1990s.

== Career ==
Sultan played with the Bahrain national football team in 9 Gulf Cups, from the 1976 tournament in Qatar to the 1994 tournament in UAE.

He won the best Asian goalkeeper award in 1994 and was also the best goalkeeper in 3 different Gulf Cups.

He is working now as a football pundit for Al-Kass sports channel in Qatar.

== Honours ==
- AFC Century Award
