= Karim Jaafar =

Iraqi association football player

Personal information
- Full name: Karim Jaafar
- Place of birth: Basra, Iraq
- Position: Defender

Youth career
- 1976–1978: Al-Thaghr SC

Senior career*
Years	Team	Apps	(Gls)
1978–1982	Al-Mina'a SC		
1982–1989	Al-Jaish SC		

International career
1984-1985	Iraq		
- * Club domestic league appearances and goals

Karim Jaafar (Arabic: كَرِيم جَعْفَر) is a former Iraqi football defender who played for Iraq at the 1984 Summer Olympics.
