= Saeed Easho =

Iraqi footballer

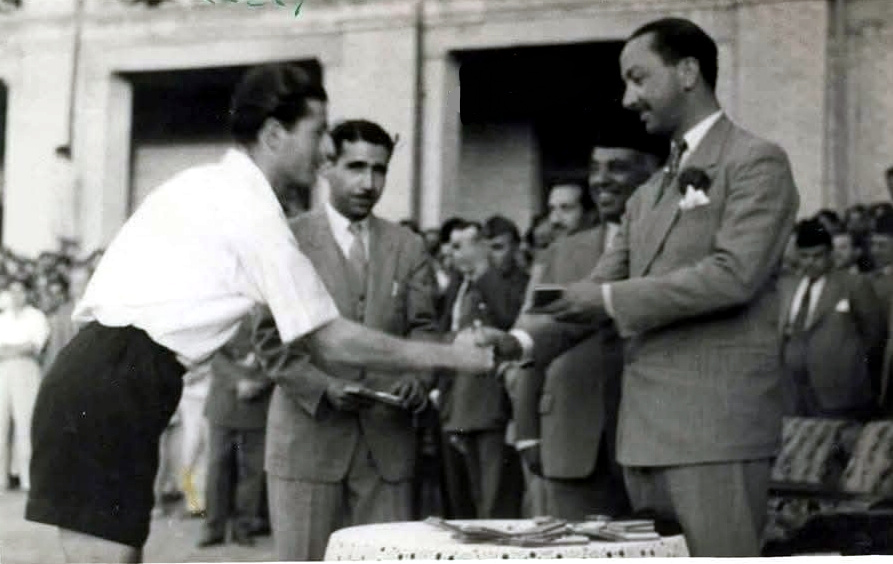
- Prince Abd al-Ilah awards medal to Al-Ittihad player Saeed Easho in 1949

Personal information
- Full name: Peter Saeed Easho Murad
- Date of birth: 1 July 1928 (age 98)
- Place of birth: Basra, Iraq
- Position: Centre-half

Youth career
- Thanawiyat Al-Basra

Senior career*
Years	Team	Apps	(Gls)
–1949	Sharikat Naft Al-Basra		
1949–1950	Al-Ittihad		
1950–1953	Al-Mina'a		
1960s	Manchester United	0	(0)

International career
1951	Iraq		
- * Club domestic league appearances and goals

Peter Saeed Easho Murad (Syriac: ܦܖܬܖܪ ܣܐܖܖܕ ܖܐܣܗܧ ܡܜܪܐܕ) (born 1928) is a former international Iraqi football player, who was one of the first players to play in first Iraq national football team, he also played for Al-Minaa, and with the reserve team of English club Manchester United during the 1960s.

== Early years ==
Saeed Easho was the son of an Eastern Orthodox priest, who had settled in the city of Basra in the early 20th century from the heart of the old Ottoman Empire. Saeed excelled at football at his primary school in the district of Al-Ashar and at Thanawiyat Al-Basra and was chosen to play for the Basra Select side while in school, taking on British Army sides based in the city during WWII. He had left the country to study but returned to work as a clerk for the Basra Petroleum Company (B.P.C.) and the Al-Minaa Club.

== International career ==
In April 1951, Easho started playing for the first Iraq national football team, He was called by coach Dhia Habib to play in the first international friendly in the history of Iraqi football. On 6 May 1951, Saeed played his first international against Turkey B in Turkey, which ended 7–0 for Turkey B.

== Travel and play for Man. United ==
After the Iraqi team return to Baghdad, Easho and his friend the player Percy Lynsdale left to study abroad, as well as he spent one year with the reserve team of English club Manchester United during the 1960s.

== Honours ==
=== Club ===
- Iraq FA Cup
  - Winner 1948–49 with Sharikat Naft Al-Basra
