= Iraq FA Baghdad Cup =

1974 Iraq FA Baghdad Cup
Tournament details
- Country: Iraq
- Dates: 26 March 1974 – 27 April 1974
- Teams: 20

Final positions
- Champions: Al-Quwa Al-Jawiya
- Runners-up: Al-Sikak Al-Hadeed

The Iraq FA Baghdad Cup was a regional knockout cup competition organised by the Iraq Central Football Association (IFA) in the 1973–74 season for teams from Baghdad and its neighbouring cities. Only one edition was played because the IFA decided to bring back the national cup tournament, the Iraq FA Cup, to be the primary knockout cup competition in Iraqi football. The tournament was won by Al-Quwa Al-Jawiya, beating Al-Sikak Al-Hadeed 2–1 in the final.

Jami'at Baghdad were banned from competing in the tournament by the IFA due to events that took place in, and their withdrawal from, their match against Kahrabaa Al-Wusta B in a second-tier league game.

== Bracket ==
First round 26 March 1974
Al-Quwa Al-Jawiya	2
Quwat Salahaddin B	0
Shortat Al-Najda	3
Quwat Al-Nasr	1
Quwat Salahaddin	1
Shortat Al-Muroor	0
Kuliyat Al-Shorta	3
Maslahat Naqil Al-Rukab	2
Al-Handasa Al-Aliya	3
Kahrabaa Al-Wusta	1
Al-Sikak Al-Hadeed	5
Al-Tamween Wal-Naqil	2
Aliyat Al-Shorta	1
Al-Asha	0
Al-Quwa Al-Jawiya B	1
Kahrabaa Al-Wusta B	0
Quwat Al-Qatiba	2
Al-Ziyout Al-Nabatia	0
Isalat Al-Mai	3
Al-Bareed wal-Barq	2

Second round
Quwat Salahaddin	2
Kuliyat Al-Shorta	1
Quwat Al-Qatiba	1
Isalat Al-Mai	0

Quarterfinals
Al-Quwa Al-Jawiya	1
Shortat Al-Najda	0
Quwat Salahaddin	5
Al-Handasa Al-Aliya	0
Al-Sikak Al-Hadeed	1
Aliyat Al-Shorta	0
Al-Quwa Al-Jawiya B (p)	1 (4)
Quwat Al-Qatiba	1 (2)

Semifinals
Al-Quwa Al-Jawiya	1
Quwat Salahaddin	0
Al-Sikak Al-Hadeed	3
Al-Quwa Al-Jawiya B	1

Final; 27 April 1974
Al-Quwa Al-Jawiya	2
Al-Sikak Al-Hadeed	1

== Matches ==
=== Semi-finals ===
April 1974

Al-Quwa Al-Jawiya	1–0	Quwat Salahaddin
Obeid

April 1974

Al-Sikak Al-Hadeed	3–1	Al-Tayaran (Al-Quwa Al-Jawiya B)
Luaibi; Gatea		Ahmed

=== Final ===
27 April 1974

Al-Quwa Al-Jawiya	2–1	Al-Sikak Al-Hadeed
Qasim; Hassan		Jassam

Al-Shaab Stadium, Baghdad
Referee: Sami Naji

Iraq FA Baghdad Cup
1974 winner
Al-Quwa Al-Jawiya
1st title
