= Thanawiyat Al-Basra =

Iraqi football club

- Full name: Thanawiyat Al-Basra
- Founded: 1920s
- Dissolved: 1968; 58 years ago
- League: Iraq FA Basra Premier League

Thanawiyat Al-Basra (Arabic: فريق ثانوية البصرة, lit. 'Basra Secondary School'), was an Iraqi football team based in Al-Ashar, Basra.

== History ==
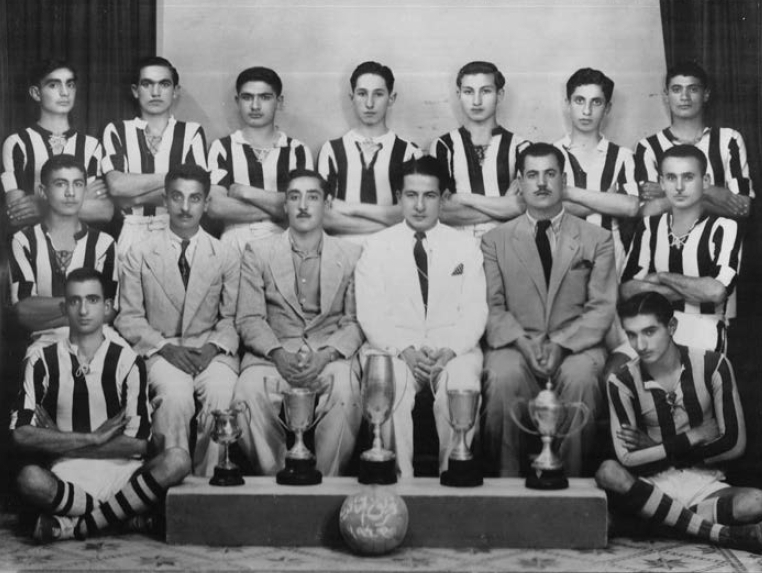
Thanawiyat Al-Basra team in 1945

The club was founded in the 1920s, and in 1931, the team played against the Bahrain national team in Basra and was able to defeat them with a score of 2–1. It was the first local Iraqi team to win over a national team.

In 1942 a very strong team was formed by high school principal Yousef Saleh and sports teacher Hamoudi Al-Bader. The team played in the official tournaments that were held during that period, and was able to qualifying for the final and finishing as runners-up in the Iraq FA Basra Premier League in 1950–51 season.

== Stadium ==
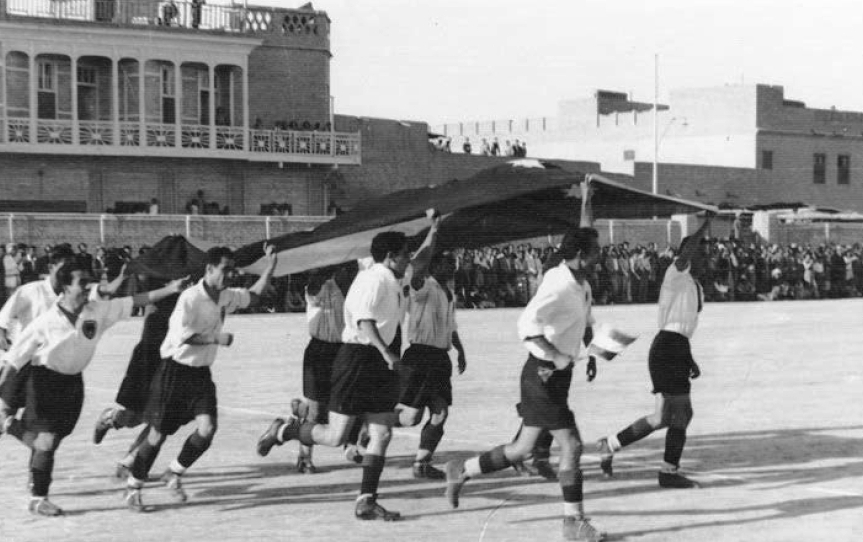
The Iranian Shahin team raises the Iraqi flag before the start of its match against Al-Minaa at Thanawiyat Al-Basra Stadium in 1951

The Thanawiyat Al-Basra stadium was established in 1925, and starting in 1941, the stadium began to become a stadium for many official tournaments such as the Hanna Al-Sheikh Cup, Al-Shamkhani Cup, and others. Various teams began choosing it to hold their friendly matches, and matches of several Iranian teams with Iraqi teams were held on it.

== Honours ==
=== Regional ===
- Iraq FA Basra Premier League (top tier)
  - Runners-up (1): 1950–51

== Notable players ==
- Saeed Easho
- Karim Allawi Homaidi
- Hamza Qasim
- Faleh Hassan Wasfi
