= Percy Lynsdale =

Iraqi footballer

Personal information
- Full name: Percy Cyril Lynsdale
- Date of birth: 1 July 1928
- Place of birth: Baghdad, Iraq
- Date of death: 1997 (aged 68–69)
- Place of death: Chorley, England
- Position: Forward

College career
Years	Team	Apps	(Gls)
–1948	Baghdad College		

Senior career*
Years	Team	Apps	(Gls)
1948–1950	Sharikat Naft Al-Basra		
1950–1951	Al-Mina'a		

International career
1951	Iraq	4	(0)
- * Club domestic league appearances and goals

Percy Cyril Lynsdale (Arabic: بيرسي لينزديل; 1 July 1928—1997) was an Iraqi footballer who played as a forward.

Born in Iraq to an Iraqi mother and a British father, Lynsdale was one of the first players to play for the Iraq national team. He played for Sharikat Naft Al-Basra and Al-Minaa at club level, before moving to England in 1951.

== Early life ==
Lynsdale's roots lie in South London, then Surrey; one of his ancestors settled in India after joining the British Army in 1797. One hundred years later, Lynsdale's father Cyril was born; he moved to Baghdad, Iraq shortly after World War I, and married an Iraqi woman, gaining Iraqi citizenship.

Born in Baghdad, Lynsdale lived for a period in Mosul due to his father's job in the Iraqi Railway company. In the early 1940s, Lynsdale studied at the Jesuit Baghdad College, and played football in the schoolyard. He eventually became part of the college's first football team, captaining them in his first senior year.

After graduating in 1948, Lynsdale and his family moved to the British community of Maqil, near Basra. Lynsdale found work as a clerk for the Basra Petroleum Company (B.P.C.).

== Career ==
While working for the B.P.C., Lynsdale played for their football team in the Basra League as an inside left. He joined Al-Mina'a in 1950.

In April 1951, Lynsdale played for the first Iraq national football team. He was called by coach Dhia Habib to play in the team's international friendly, against Turkey B in Turkey on 6 May 1951, which ended 7–0 for Turkey B.

After the national team returned to Baghdad in 1951, Lynsdale and his international teammate Saeed Easho left to study abroad, and never returned to Iraq. Lynsdale studied in Norwich, England, becoming a self-employed trader. He played Sunday league football in Manchester.

Lynsdale died in Chorley, in 1997.
