= Karim Allawi Homaidi =

Iraqi footballer (1928–2023)

Karim Allawi
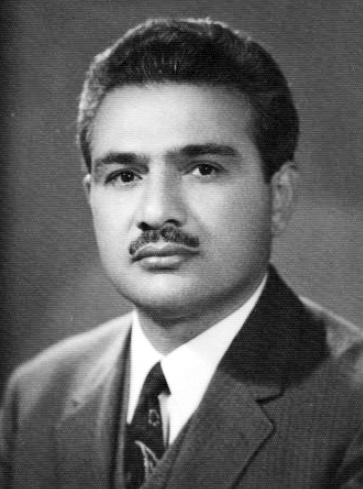
- Karim Allawi in 1970s.

Personal information
- Full name: Abdul Karim Ali Homaidi
- Date of birth: 1 July 1928
- Place of birth: Basra, Iraq
- Date of death: 22 July 2023 (aged 95)
- Place of death: Basra, Iraq
- Position: Forward

Youth career
- 1942–1945: Thanawiyat Al-Basra

Senior career*
Years	Team	Apps	(Gls)
1945–1960	Al-Mina'a		

International career
1951	Iraq		
- * Club domestic league appearances and goals

Karim Allawi Homaidi (Arabic: كريم علاوي حميدي, 1 July 1928 – 22 July 2023) was an Iraqi footballer who played as a forward. He was one of the first players to play in the Iraq national team and also played for Al-Minaa.

== International career ==
In April 1951, Allawi started playing for the first Iraq national team, He was called by coach Dhia Habib to play in the first international friendly in the history of Iraqi football. On 6 May 1951, Allawi played his first international against Turkey B in Turkey, which ended 7–0 for Turkey B. Karim Allawi played in the inside left position and wore the No.10 jersey against the Turks.

== Death ==
Allawi Homaidi died in Basra on 22 July 2023, at the age of 95. Al-Minaa SC issued a statement mourning his death.

== Honours ==
Al-Minaa

- Hanna Al-Sheikh Cup: 1951 with Al-Minaa

== Gallery ==
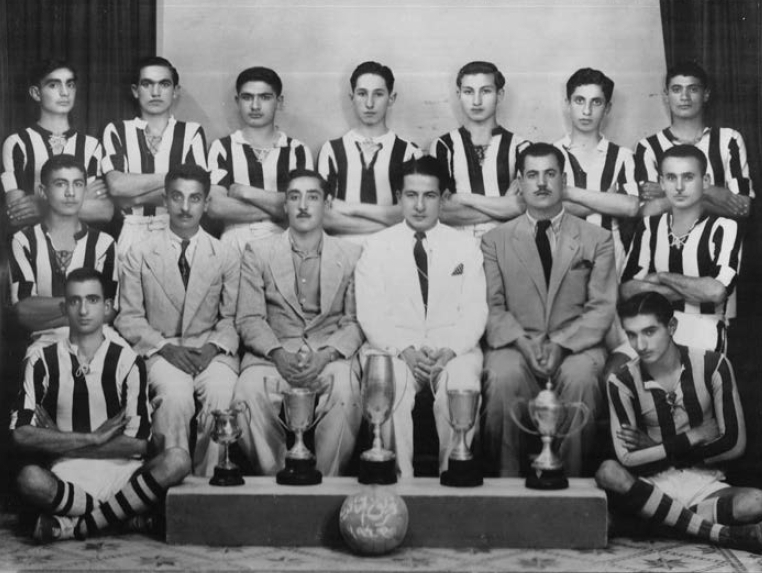
Allawi with the Thanawiyat Al-Basra team in 1945, with the standing players, third from the left.

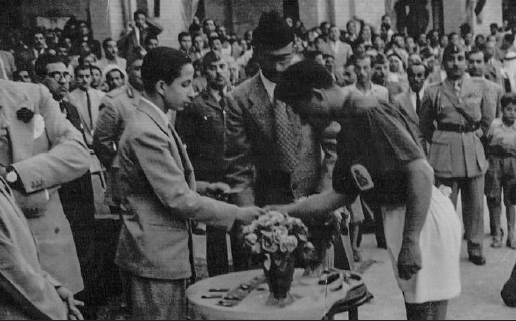
King Faisal II awards medals to Al-Minaa captain Allawi after Al-Minaa won the King Cup in 1948.

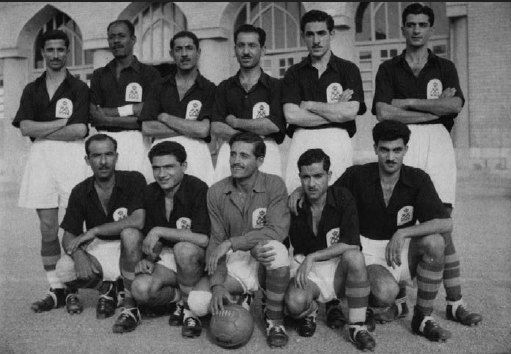
Allawi with the Al-Minaa lineup in 1950 at Al-Amjadiya Stadium in Tahran, with the seated players, second from the left.

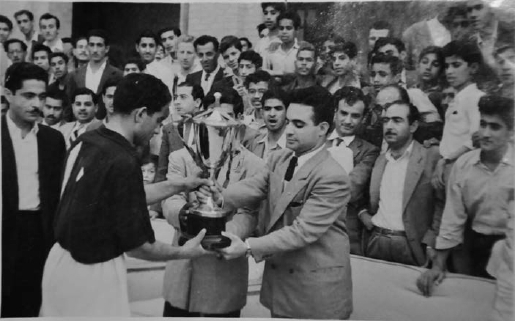
Al-Minaa captain Allawi receives the Hanna Al-Sheikh trophy after the team won the championship in 1951.

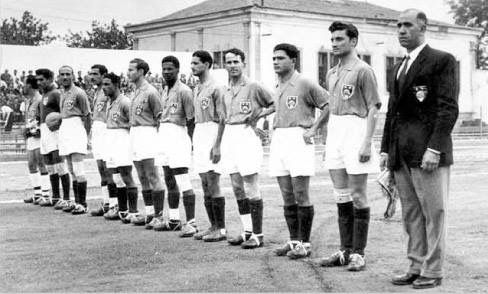
Allawi with the Iraq national team lineup in İzmir in 1951, third from the right.
