= Al-Rafidain SC =

Iraqi football club

- Full name: Al-Rafidain Sport Club
- Founded: 1965; 60 years ago
- Ground: Al-Rafidain Stadium
- Chairman: Mohammed Abdul-Amir
- League: Iraqi Third Division League
Home colours	Away colours

Al-Rafidain Sport Club (Arabic: نادي الرافدين الرياضي) is an Iraqi football team based in Al Diwaniyah, that plays in Iraqi Third Division League.

== History ==
=== in Premier League ===
Al-Rafidain team played in the Iraqi Premier League for the first time in the 1974–75 season, when the first edition of the Clubs League was launched in Iraq, and the team was not good enough, and finished the season at the bottom of the standings, and eventually relegated to the Iraqi First Division League.

== Famous players ==
- Faleh Abed Hajim (1966–1968)

== See also ==
- 2000–01 Iraqi Elite League
- 2021–22 Iraq FA Cup
