= Sharikat Naft Al-Basra =

Iraqi football club

- Full name: Sharikat Naft Al-Basra
- Founded: 1941
- Dissolved: 1968; 58 years ago
- League: Iraq FA Basra Premier League

Sharikat Naft Al-Basra (Arabic: فريق شركة نفط البصرة, lit. 'Basra Petroleum Company'), known as BPC for short, was an Iraqi football team based in Basra which represented the Basra Petroleum Company. They became Iraq's first ever national cup winners when they won the 1948–49 Iraq FA Cup that was played by teams from across the country.

They competed regularly in the Iraq FA Basra Premier League, a regional league for teams in Basra, winning the title in 1949–50 and 1950–51, finishing as runners-up in 1948–49 and finishing third in 1962–63 season. The team was disbanded in 1968.

== Honours ==
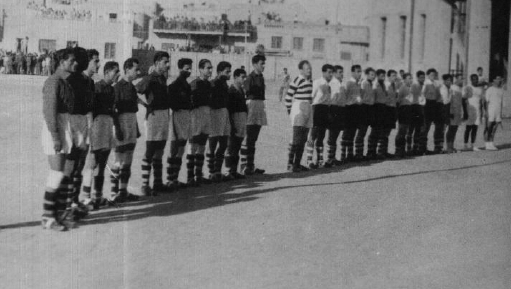
Sharikat Naft Al-Basra and Al-Minaa players before the start of their match at Thanawiyat Al-Basra Stadium in 1952

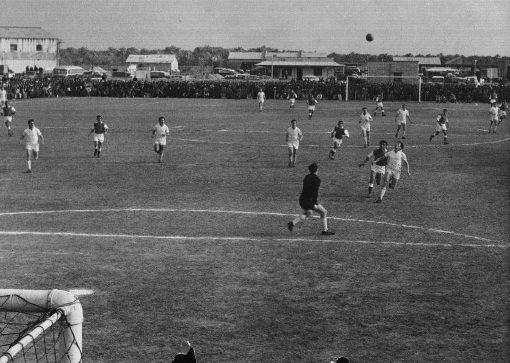
Sharikat Naft Al-Basra Stadium in 1950s

=== Major ===
Type	Competition	Titles	Seasons
Domestic (national)	Iraq FA Cup	1	1948–49
Domestic (regional)	Iraq FA Basra Premier League	2+	1949–50, 1950–51

=== Minor ===
Competition	Titles	Seasons
Ministry of Oil Cup	1	1961–62
Industries Exhibition Cup	1	1953–54
Al-Minaa Cup	1	1949–50
Al-Shamkhany Cup	1	1949–50
Regent's Cup	1	1948–49
Hanna Al-Sheikh Cup	1	1948–49
Asfar Knockout Cup	2	1946–47, 1947–48

== Notable players ==
- Saeed Easho
- Shaker Ismail
- Percy Lynsdale
- Zia Shaoul
