= Dhia Habib =

Iraqi sports coach

Dhia Habib Fahmi Al-Khayali (Arabic: ضِيَاء حَبِيب فَهْمِيّ الْخَيَالِيّ; born 1915) was an Iraqi football coach. he was the coach of the first official Iraqi national team that played Turkey in İzmir in 1951. The Iraqi team was made up of top players from Baghdad, Basra and Habbaniyah. Iraq played two matches in the Turkish cities of İzmir and Ankara in May 1951 where the Iraqi national side played Turkey B and an Ankara Select XI. They lost both matches 7-0 and 7-5.

The Iraqi team returned to Baghdad and the players parted ways. Saeed Easho and Percy Lynsdale left to study abroad in Europe while Aram Karam stayed in Iraq to play for the Iraq Petroleum Company in Kirkuk and eventually emigrated to the United States. In a matter of months, the 1951 team had been broken up with several members leaving the country.

The team captain Wadud Khalil who had represented his country at the 1948 Olympic Games in London was expelled from the army for his political affiliations and left for Austria in 1953 where he played for two clubs in the lower divisions in the city of Vienna with one of the reserve teams at Austria Wien and Austrian police club Polizei SV. Two defenders left to play in Kuwait where one of them went on to play for the Kuwaiti national side.

The goalkeeper Adil Kamil got into a row with a colleague and decided it was best to hang up his gloves and try out boxing, becoming a national champion in the sport. Another player Ghazi Abdullah went on to become one of Iraq’s top cartoonists and even worked with Uday Saddam Hussein’s sports magazine Al-Rasheed in the eighties.

Only one of the 16 players from the squad which travelled to Turkey would remain in the side for Iraq’s next international fixture that was played six years later. The sole survivor was Jamil Abbas who captained Iraq in their first full international against Morocco at the 1957 Pan Arab Games in Beirut and became one of the Iraqi national team’s longest serving players with a statue built in his honour after his retirement at the old Kashafa Stadium in Baghdad, where it stands today. He was employed by the Ministry of Education and was a secretary at the Iraq Football Association.
