= 1974–75 Iraqi National League =

Iraqi National League
- Season: 1974–75
- Champions: Al-Tayaran (1st title)
- Relegated: Al-Rafidain
- Top goalscorer: Thamer Yousif (12 goals)

The 1974–75 Iraqi National Clubs First Division League was the first edition of the competition since the Iraq Football Association (IFA) founded it as the country's first nationwide league of clubs, replacing the Iraqi National First Division League that had been established one year prior for clubs and institutions. Al-Tayaran (now known as Al-Quwa Al-Jawiya) won the title.

== Changes from previous season ==
Iraq's 16 top division teams were reduced to 10 clubs (names highlighted in bold) for the 1974–75 season.

#	Team	Region	1973–74 pos	Changes
1	Al-Quwa Al-Jawiya	Baghdad	1st	Renamed to **Al-Tayaran SC**
2	Aliyat Al-Shorta	Baghdad	2nd	Replaced by **Al-Shorta SC** as a single team in Baghdad
2	Shortat Al-Najda	Baghdad	8th	Replaced by **Al-Shorta SC** as a single team in Baghdad
2	Shortat Erbil	Erbil	14th	Replaced by **Al-Shorta SC** as a single team in Baghdad
2	Kuliyat Al-Shorta	Baghdad	Promoted	Replaced by **Al-Shorta SC** as a single team in Baghdad
3	Al-Minaa	Basra	3rd	Merged to form **Al-Muwasalat SC**
3	Al-Bareed wal-Barq	Baghdad	9th	Merged to form **Al-Muwasalat SC**
4	Quwat Al-Nasr	Baghdad	4th	Replaced by **Al-Jaish SC** as a single team in Baghdad
4	Quwat Salahaddin	Habbaniya	6th	Replaced by **Al-Jaish SC** as a single team in Baghdad
4	Al-Quwa Al-Bahriya	Basra	Promoted	Replaced by **Al-Jaish SC** as a single team in Baghdad
5	Kahrabaa Al-Wusta	Baghdad	5th	Renamed to **Al-Sinaa SC**
6	Al-Sikak Al-Hadeed	Baghdad	7th	Renamed to **Al-Naqil SC**
7	**Al-Samawa SC**	Samawa	10th	No change
8	**Babil SC**	Hilla	13th	No change
9	**Al-Rafidain SC**	Diwaniya	15th	No change
10	Isalat Al-Mai	Baghdad	Promoted	Merged with Maslahat Naqil Al-Rukab to form **Al-Baladiyat SC**

== League table ==
Pos	Team	Pld	W	D	L	GF	GA	GD	Pts	Qualification or relegation
1	Al-Tayaran	18	13	4	1	36	11	+25	30	League Champions
2	Al-Naqil (Note: Al-Naqil were dissolved after the end of the season.)	18	13	3	2	47	11	+36	29	
3	Al-Muwasalat (Note: Al-Muwasalat were dissolved after the end of the season, and Al-Minaa were reinstated in their place.)	18	12	3	3	29	13	+16	27	
4	Al-Sinaa	18	10	5	3	36	16	+20	25	
5	Al-Shorta	18	8	3	7	29	33	−4	19	
6	Al-Samawa	18	5	6	7	22	23	−1	16	
7	Al-Baladiyat	18	5	5	8	15	27	−12	15	
8	Al-Jaish	18	3	4	11	13	30	−17	10	
9	Babil	18	2	2	14	9	38	−29	6	
10	Al-Rafidain	18	0	3	15	7	41	−34	3	Relegated to Iraqi National Second Division

Source: Ali Al-Sabti Archive

== Results ==
Home \ Away	BLD	JSH	MUW	NAQ	RFD	SMW	SHR	SIN	TAY	BBL
Al-Baladiyat		0–0	0–4	1–3	2–0	1–1	0–0	1–1	0–1	2–0
Al-Jaish	4–0		1–2	0–2	0–0	1–1	1–4	0–2	0–3	1–0
Al-Muwasalat	1–0	2–0		1–0	3–0	0–0	3–0	2–2	1–0	1–0
Al-Naqil	1–0	4–1	3–0		1–0	3–2	11–0	0–0	1–1	1–0
Al-Rafidain	0–1	0–0	0–1	1–7		1–2	0–5	1–2	0–3	0–1
Al-Samawa	3–0	1–0	1–1	0–1	2–2		2–0	2–4	1–2	0–0
Al-Shorta	1–2	3–1	3–2	1–2	2–1	2–0		2–0	1–1	2–2
Al-Sinaa	4–1	2–0	1–3	1–1	4–0	1–0	3–0		0–1	2–1
Al-Tayaran	2–2	4–0	2–1	2–1	3–0	3–2	1–0	1–1		3–0
Babil	1–2	0–3	0–1	0–5	2–1	1–2	1–3	0–6	0–3	

Source: Ali Al-Sabti Archive
Legend: Blue = home team win; Yellow = draw; Red = away team win.

== Season statistics ==
=== Top scorers ===
Pos	Scorer	Goals	Team
1	Thamer Yousif	12	Al-Naqil
2	Kadhim Waal	9	Al-Muwasalat

=== Hat-tricks ===
Player	For	Against	Result	Date
(Iraq) Thamer Yousif^{5}	Al-Naqil	Al-Shorta	11–0	12 October 1974
(Iraq) Ali Hussein Mahmoud	Al-Shorta	Al-Jaish	3–1	17 October 1974
(Iraq) Salah Obeid	Al-Tayaran	Al-Jaish	4–0	17 November 1974
(Iraq) Kadhim Luaibi	Al-Naqil	Al-Rafidain	7–1	25 January 1975
(Iraq) Thamer Yousif	Al-Naqil	Al-Rafidain	7–1	25 January 1975
(Iraq) Ali Kadhim	Al-Naqil	Al-Muwasalat	3–0	14 March 1975

Notes

^{5} Player scored 5 goals
