= Sabah Abdul-Jalil =

Iraqi footballer and coach (1951–2021)

Personal information
- Date of birth: 1 July 1951
- Place of birth: Baghdad, Iraq
- Date of death: 28 February 2021 (aged 69)
- Place of death: Baghdad, Iraq
- Position: Midfielder

Senior career*
Years	Team	Apps	(Gls)
–	Al-Kuliya Al-Askariya		
–	Al-Baladiyat		

International career
1975–1979	Iraq	37	(6)

Managerial career
- 1997–1998: Olympique de Médéa
- 2001: Al-Zawraa
- 2004–2006: Al-Quwa Al-Jawiya
- 2008–2009: Al-Naft
- 2009–2010: Al-Quwa Al-Jawiya
- 2010–2011: Al-Naft
- 2011–2012: Al-Naft
- 2014: Al-Naft
- 2015–2016: Al-Quwa Al-Jawiya
- * Club domestic league appearances and goals

Sabah Abdul-Jalil (Arabic: صَبَّاح عَبْد الْجَلِيل; 1 July 1951 – 28 February 2021) was an Iraqi footballer who later became a coach, last coaching Al-Quwa Al-Jawiya.

Abdul-Jalil played as a midfielder. He died from COVID-19 during the COVID-19 pandemic in Iraq.

== Career statistics ==
=== International goals ===
Scores and results list Iraq's goal tally first, score column indicates score after each Abdul-Jalil goal.

List of international goals scored by Sabah Abdul-Jalil
No.	Date	Venue	Opponent	Score	Result	Competition
1	21 December 1975	Aryamehr Stadium, Tehran	United Arab Emirates	4–0	5–0	1975 Palestine Cup
2	29 March 1976	Grand Hamad Stadium, Doha	Bahrain	3–0	4–1	4th Arabian Gulf Cup
3	1 April 1976	Grand Hamad Stadium, Doha	Saudi Arabia	2–0	7–1	4th Arabian Gulf Cup
4	6 April 1976	Grand Hamad Stadium, Doha	United Arab Emirates	3–0	4–0	4th Arabian Gulf Cup
5	8 April 1976	Grand Hamad Stadium, Doha	Kuwait	1–2	2–2	4th Arabian Gulf Cup
6	11 June 1976	Aryamehr Stadium, Tehran	Kuwait	1–1	2–3	1976 AFC Asian Cup

=== Managerial statistics ===
As of 3 April 2016

Team	Nat	From	To	Record				
Team	Nat	From	To	G	W	D	L	Win %
Al-Quwa Al-Jawiya	(Iraq)	9 August 2015	3 April 2016	27	16	4	7	59.26
Total				27	16	4	7	59.26

== Honours ==
=== Club ===
Al-Zawraa

- Iraqi Premier League: 2000–01

Al-Quwa Al-Jawiya

- Iraqi Premier League: 2004–05
