= Al-Etisalat SC =

Iraqi football club

Al-Etisalat The Communications Club (English)
- Full name: Al-Etisalat Sports Club
- Founded: 1963; 63 years ago (as a team); 1992; 34 years ago (as a club)
- Chairman: Emad Mohsin
- Manager: Rasheed Sultan
- League: Iraqi Premier Division League
- 2025–26: Iraqi Premier Division League, 6th of 20
Home colours	Away colours

Al-Etisalat Sports Club (The Communications, Arabic: الاتصالات), is an Iraqi football team based in Baghdad was called Al-Bareed before season 2009/10. They play in the Iraqi Premier Division League.

The Al-Bareed team was founded in 1963, and was merged with Al-Minaa for the 1974–75 season to form Al-Muwasalat. After the season ended, Al-Muwasalat was dissolved and Al-Minaa were reinstated in their place, meanwhile Al-Bareed was consigned to competing in non-IFA competitions as it was an institute-representative team and not a club. In 1992, Al-Bareed was registered as a sports club and entered the lower divisions of Iraqi club football organised by the IFA.

== Managerial history ==
- (Iraq) Hamza Dawood
- (Iraq) Ahmed Hassan Abdul-Sahib
- (Iraq) Rasheed Sultan

== Honours ==
- Iraqi First Division League (third tier)
  - Winner (1): 2021–22
