= 2020–21 Al-Mina'a SC season =

Al-Mina'a SC
2020–21 season
- Chairman: Mohammed Jaber Hassan
- Manager: Valeriu Tița (until 16 January); Adel Nasser (from 23 January until 10 April); Ahmed Rahim (from 10 April)
- Ground: Basra Sports City
- Premier League: 8th
- FA Cup: Quarter-finals
- Top goalscorer: League: Hussein Younis (10 goals); All: Hussein Younis (10 goals)
Home colours	Away colours

The 2020–21 season will be Al-Minaa's 45th season in the Iraqi Premier League, having featured in all 47 editions of the competition except two. Al-Minaa are participating in the Iraqi Premier League and the Iraq FA Cup.

Al-Mina'a will be looking to wrestle back the title they won in the 1977–78 season.

== Review ==
=== Background ===
After the good level that the team showed in last season under the leadership of Valeriu Tița, who made the team top the league table after four rounds without losing, and had it not been for the cancellation of the league due to the COVID-19 pandemic, the team would have continued to make impressive performances, so the club management saw the need to renew the coach's contract and keep the players. Indeed, Tița's contract was renewed, and contracts renewed for most of the players of the previous season, also, good deals were added to the team, as the club signed the international player Emad Mohsin, the U-23 national team player, Abdul Abbas Ayad, and the U-20 national team player, Ali Shawqi. And the three foreign players were released, except for Abdoul Madjid Moumouni, who performed well, and three foreign professionals were signed, Senegalese Idrissa Niang, Ivorian Jean-Jacques Bougouhi, and Cameroonian Rostand Junior M'baï, as well as the Roman fitness coach Marius. It also appointed former player Rahim Bakr as a sports consultant within the technical staff. The league fixtures were released on 1 October, with Al-Minaa to kick off the new season home at Basra against Al-Hudood on 25 October.

== Squad ==
Note: Flags indicate national team as defined under FIFA eligibility rules; some limited exceptions apply. Players may hold more than one non-FIFA nationality.

No.	Pos.	Nation	Player
3	DF	IRQ	Hamza Adnan (Captain)
4	DF	IRQ	Karrar Mohammed
5	MF	IRQ	Ahmed Mohsin Ashour
6	DF	IRQ	Abbas Badie
7	MF	IRQ	Hussein Younis
11	DF	IRQ	Aqeel Mahdi
12	GK	IRQ	Yassin Karim
16	MF	IRQ	Ali Shawqi
17	FW	CMR	Rostand Junior M'baï
18	FW	IRQ	Salem Ahmed
21	GK	IRQ	Mujtaba Mohammed
22	GK	IRQ	Hussam Mahdi
23	DF	IRQ	Ahmed Yahya
28	MF	NIG	Abdoul Madjid Moumouni

No.	Pos.	Nation	Player
29	DF	IRQ	Karrar Al-Amir Ali
31	GK	IRQ	Murtadha Sami
32	DF	IRQ	Ali Qasim
33	DF	IRQ	Abbas Yas
34	MF	IRQ	Sajed Abbas Hashim
35	DF	IRQ	Ahmed Khaled
36	FW	IRQ	Sajjad Saeed
38	MF	IRQ	Murtadha Shaker
39	MF	IRQ	Abdullah Wasfi
40	GK	IRQ	Hussein Saleh Mahdi
55	MF	IRQ	Saif Jassim
77	MF	IRQ	Sadeq Sami
92	MF	SEN	Idrissa Niang
99	FW	IRQ	Mohammed Shokan

== Transfers ==
=== In ===
Date	Pos.	Name	From	Fee	Ref.
27 July 2020	DM	(Iraq) Abdul Abbas Ayad	(Iraq) Al-Naft	Free transfer	
28 July 2020	CF	(Iraq) Emad Mohsin	(Sudan) Al-Hilal	Free transfer	
18 September 2020	AM	(Iraq) Ali Shawqi	(Iraq) Al-Bahri	Free transfer	
19 September 2020	GK	(Iraq) Murtadha Sami	Youth system	n/a	
1 October 2020	DM	(Senegal) Idrissa Niang	(Lebanon) Nejmeh	Free transfer	
6 October 2020	CF	(Ivory Coast) Jean-Jacques Bougouhi	Ararat-Armenia	Free transfer	
7 October 2020	CF	(Cameroon) Rostand Junior M'baï	(Morocco) Ittihad Tanger	Free transfer	
12 October 2020	CF	(Iraq) Sajjad Saeed	Youth system	n/a	
4 February 2021	LW	(Iraq) Ammar Abdul-Hussein	(Iraq) Al-Zawraa	Free transfer	
5 February 2021	CF	(Iraq) Murtaja Adel Nasser	(Iraq) Naft Maysan	Free transfer	
16 February 2021	RB	(Iraq) Karrar Al-Amir Ali	(Iraq) Al-Bahri	Free transfer	
16 February 2021	CF	(Iraq) Mohammed Shokan	(Iraq) Al-Shorta	Free transfer	
18 February 2021	CB	(Iraq) Karrar Mohammed	(Iraq) Amanat Baghdad	Free transfer	
28 February 2021	GK	(Iraq) Hussein Salih Mahdi	Youth system	n/a	

=== Out ===
Date	Pos.	Name	To	Fee	Ref.
1 June 2020	CB	(Lebanon) Kassem El Zein	(Lebanon) Nejmeh	End of Loan	
13 September 2020	RW	(Iraq) Ahmed Zamel	(Iraq) Naft Al-Basra	Free transfer	
13 September 2020	LW	(Iraq) Ahmed Farhan	(Iraq) Naft Al-Basra	Free transfer	
1 October 2020	CF	(Ghana) Stephen Sarfo	(Ghana) Berekum Chelsea	Free transfer	
7 October 2020	CF	(Mauritania) Ely Cheikh Voulany	(Saudi Arabia) Wej	Free transfer	
2 November 2020	CF	(Ivory Coast) Jean-Jacques Bougouhi	Unattached	Released	
2 January 2021	CF	(Iraq) Emad Mohsin	(Iraq) Naft Al-Wasat	Free transfer	
4 February 2021	DM	(Iraq) Abdul Abbas Ayad	(Iraq) Naft Al-Wasat	Free transfer	
9 June 2021	RB	(Iraq) Hussein Falah	Unattached	Released	
9 June 2021	CF	(Iraq) Murtaja Adel Nasser	Unattached	Released	
9 June 2021	RW	(Iraq) Ammar Abdul-Hussein	Unattached	Released	
9 June 2021	SS	(Iraq) Hossam Malik	Unattached	Released	

== Personnel ==
=== Technical staff ===
Position	Name	Nationality
Manager:	Ahmed Rahim	(Iraq)
Goalkeeping coach:	Qusay Jabbar	(Iraq)
Fitness coach:	Ali Mohammed	(Iraq)
Team doctor:	Fares Abdullah	(Iraq)
Sport consultant:	Rahim Bakr	(Iraq)
Team supervisor:	Jihad Madlool	(Iraq)
Administrator:	Salah Khalil	(Iraq)

Updated to match played 10 April 2021
Source: sportnow-iq.net

=== Board members ===
Position	Name	Nationality
President:	Mohammad Jaber Al-Jaberi	(Iraq)
Secretary:	Taher Balas	(Iraq)
Treasurer:	Ali Kadhim Mubarak	(Iraq)
Member of the Board:	Nazar Taha Humoud	(Iraq)
Member of the Board:	Jihad Madlool Obaid	(Iraq)
Member of the Board:	Ahmed Hamed Al-Jaberi	(Iraq)
Member of the Board:	Nabeel Abdul Ameer Jamil	(Iraq)
Member of the Board:	Jalil Hanoon	(Iraq)
Member of the Board:	Hani Abed Waleed	(Iraq)

Updated to match played 8 December 2018
Source: Alsumaria.tv

== Stadium ==
During the previous seasons, the stadium of Al-Mina'a was demolished. A company will build a new stadium that will be completed in March 2021. Since they can't play their games at Al Mina'a Stadium, they will be playing at Basra Sports City during this season.

== Friendlies ==
Win Draw Loss Fixtures

14 October 2020 Friendly	Al-Mina'a	1 – 1	Al-Noor	Basra
13:00 GMT	Khaled		Goal	Stadium: Basra Sports City

16 October 2020 Friendly	Al-Mina'a	0 – 2	Al-Zawra'a	Basra
14:00 GMT			Abdul-Zahra 67'; Mahmoud 90+2'	Stadium: Basra Sports City

21 October 2020 Friendly	Al-Mina'a	7 – 1	Al-Noor	Basra
13:00 GMT	Yahya; Yas; Jassim; Saeed; Younis; Ezzedine		Goal	Stadium: Basra Sports City

12 November 2020 Friendly	Al-Mina'a	3 – 1	Al-Samawa	Basra
12:30 GMT	M'baï; Abu Kraisha		Saad	Stadium: Basra Sports City

== Competitions ==
=== Overview ===
Competition	First match	Last match	Starting round	Final position	Record							
Competition	First match	Last match	Starting round	Final position	Pld	W	D	L	GF	GA	GD	Win %
Premier League	25 October 2020	18 July 2021	Matchday 1	8th	38	12	13	13	45	44	+1	31.58
FA Cup	18 November 2020	4 June 2021	Round of 32	Quarter-finals	3	2	0	1	2	2	+0	66.67
Total					41	14	13	14	47	46	+1	34.15

Last updated: 18 July 2021
Source: Competitions

=== Premier League ===
==== League table ====
Pos	Team	Pld	W	D	L	GF	GA	GD	Pts
6	Al-Naft	38	12	17	9	36	34	+2	53
7	Amanat Baghdad	38	13	11	14	30	32	−2	50
8	Al-Minaa	38	12	13	13	45	44	+1	49
9	Zakho	38	10	16	12	35	40	−5	46
10	Al-Karkh	38	11	12	15	35	40	−5	45

Source: IPFL
Rules for classification: 1) points; 2) head-to-head points; 3) head-to-head goal difference; 4) goal difference; 5) number of wins; 6) number of goals scored.

==== Summary table ====
Overall								Home						Away					
Pld	W	D	L	GF	GA	GD	Pts	W	D	L	GF	GA	GD	W	D	L	GF	GA	GD
38	12	13	13	45	44	+1	49	9	5	5	25	17	+8	3	8	8	20	27	−7

Last updated: 18 July 2021.
Source: Goalzz.com

==== Results by matchday ====
Matchday	1	2	3	4	5	6	7	8	9	10	11	12	13	14	15	16	17	18	19	20	21	22	23	24	25	26	27	28	29	30	31	32	33	34	35	36	37	38
Ground	H	A	H	A	A	H	A	H	H	A	H	A	A	H	A	H	H	A	A	A	H	A	H	H	A	H	A	A	H	A	H	H	A	H	A	A	H	H
Result	D	L	L	L	W	W	D	D	D	D	L	L	L	L	W	W	W	L	D	D	W	D	L	D	D	W	L	D	W	W	L	W	D	W	L	L	W	D
Position	11	17	19	19	17	14	12	13	15	15	15	17	18	19	17	14	12	12	12	12	11	11	11	11	12	10	12	13	11	9	9	8	8	7	8	9	8	8

Updated to match(es) played on 18 July 2021. Source: Goalzz.com
A = Away; H = Home; W = Win; D = Draw; L = Loss

==== Matches ====
25 October 2020 1	Al-Mina'a	0 – 0	Al-Hudood	Basra
15:00 GMT	Badie (yellow card) 90+1'	Report	Raad (yellow card) 50'; Ali (yellow card) 51'	Stadium: Basra Sports City; Attendance: 0 Referee: Watheq Mohammed

30 October 2020 2	Al-Samawa	1 – 0	Al-Mina'a	Samawa
11:30 GMT	Khairi 77'		Niang (yellow card) 32'; Jassim (yellow card) 54'	Stadium: As Samawah Stadium; Attendance: 0 Referee: Mohammed Sadeq

4 November 2020 3	Al-Mina'a	1 – 3	Al-Kahrabaa	Basra
14:30 GMT	Khaled (yellow card) 38'; Malik (yellow card) 68'; Emad 72' (yellow card) 90+4'		Ibrahim 29', 30'; Owolabi 60'; Hatam (yellow card) 62'; Abdul-Mohsin (yellow card) 76'; Abdul-Sada (yellow card) 77'	Stadium: Basra Sports City; Attendance: 0 Referee: Watheq Mohammed

23 November 2020 4	Al-Najaf	1 – 0	Al-Mina'a	Baghdad
11:00 GMT	Abdul-Zahra 50'; Ammar (yellow card) 90+2'		Niang (yellow card) 13'; Malik (yellow card) 58'	Stadium: Al-Saher Ahmed Radhi Stadium; Attendance: 0 Referee: Haitham Mohammed Ali

28 November 2020 5	Naft Al-Basra	1 – 2	Al-Mina'a	Basra
15:30 GMT	Zamel 2'		Younis 72'; M'baï 83'	Stadium: Basra Sports City; Attendance: 0 Referee: Feed Karim

2 December 2020 6	Al-Mina'a	1 – 0	Naft Maysan	Basra
15:30 GMT	M'baï 32'; Niang (yellow card) 81'; Mohammed (yellow card) 90+1'		Karim (yellow card) 5'; Diabaté (yellow card) 69'	Stadium: Basra Sports City; Attendance: 0 Referee: Ahmed Kadhim

7 December 2020 7	Al-Sinaat Al-Kahrabaiya	0 – 0	Al-Mina'a	Baghdad
11:00 GMT				Stadium: Al-Sinaa Stadium; Attendance: 0 Referee: Omid Mustafa

12 December 2020 8	Al-Mina'a	2 - 2	Al-Karkh	Basra
15:00 GMT	H.Younis 56'; Ahmed 57'		Khalil 18'; M.Younis 57'	Stadium: Basra Sports City; Attendance: 0 Referee: Watheq Mohammed

18 December 2020 9	Al-Mina'a	0 – 0	Al-Zawra'a	Basra
14:00 GMT				Stadium: Basra Sports City; Attendance: 0 Referee: Ali Sabah

23 December 2020 10	Erbil	2 - 2	Al-Mina'a	Erbil
11:30 GMT	Sherzad 21'; Shakor 70'		Younis 38'; Malik 48' (pen.)	Stadium: Franso Hariri Stadium; Attendance: 0 Referee: Mohammed Riyadh

29 December 2020 11	Al-Mina'a	0 - 1	Amanat Baghdad	Basra
11:00 GMT			Karim 65'	Stadium: Basra Sports City; Attendance: 0 Referee: Mohammed Salman

2 January 2021 12	Al-Shorta	4 – 2	Al-Mina'a	Baghdad
13:56 GMT	Qasim 2'; Abdul-Amir 4'; Mohammed 33'; Attwan 69' (pen.)		M'baï 60'; Younis 90+2'	Stadium: Al-Shaab Stadium; Attendance: 0 Referee: Salem Amer

7 January 2021 13	Zakho	2 – 1	Al-Mina'a	Zakho
11:11 GMT	Waleed 35' (pen.); Jawad 82'		Jassim 27' (pen.)	Stadium: Zakho International Stadium; Attendance: 0 Referee: Yousif Saeed

16 January 2021 14	Al-Mina'a	0 – 1	Al-Naft	Basra
14:15 GMT			Abubakir 73'	Stadium: Basra Sports City; Attendance: 0 Referee: Mohanad Qasim

21 January 2021 15	Al-Qasim	1 – 2	Al-Mina'a	Babil
11:00 GMT	Sabah 62'		Younis 10', 82'; Jassim (penalty missed) 80'	Stadium: Al Kifl Stadium; Attendance: 0 Referee: Mohammed Salman

31 January 2021 16	Al-Mina'a	1 – 0	Al-Talaba	Basra
12:17 GMT	Younis 27'			Stadium: Basra Sports City; Attendance: 0 Referee: Watheq Mohammed

4 February 2021 17	Al-Mina'a	2 – 0	Al-Diwaniya	Basra
14:30 GMT	M'baï 10', 33'			Stadium: Basra Sports City; Attendance: 0 Referee: Mohanad Qasim

8 February 2021 18	Al-Quwa Al-Jawiya	2 – 1	Al-Mina'a	Baghdad
14:00 GMT	Radhi 27' (pen.); Saeed 84'		Malik 30'	Stadium: Al-Shaab Stadium; Attendance: 0 Referee: Ali Sabah

14 February 2021 19	Naft Al-Wasat	1 – 1	Al-Mina'a	Karbala
13:23 GMT	Jassim 44' (pen.)		M'baï 8'	Stadium: Karbalaa International Stadium; Attendance: 0 Referee: Ahmed Kadhim

24 February 2021 20	Al-Hudood	1 – 1	Al-Mina'a	Baghdad
11:05 GMT	Taha 47', (red card) 75'		Shokan (red card) 90+4'; Younis 90+6'	Stadium: Al-Taji Stadium; Attendance: 0 Referee: Zaid Thamer

1 March 2021 21	Al-Mina'a	3 – 1	Al-Samawa	Basra
14:55 GMT	Abdul-Hussein 3'; Malik 68'; Younis 80'		Saad 34'	Stadium: Basra Sports City; Attendance: 0 Referee: Mohammed Riyadh

5 March 2021 22	Al-Kahraba	2 – 2	Al-Mina'a	Baghdad
11:00 GMT	Mhaysen 6'; Saleem 61'		Shokan 21' (pen.), 39'	Stadium: Al-Taji Stadium; Attendance: 0 Referee: Haitham Mohammed Ali

11 March 2021 23	Al-Mina'a	0 – 2	Al-Najaf	Basra
15:00 GMT			Sallal 26'; Abdul-Zahra 46'	Stadium: Basra Sports City; Attendance: 0 Referee: Ali Sabah

11 March 2021 24	Al-Mina'a	1 – 1	Naft Al-Basra	Basra
15:00 GMT	Malik 58'; Shokan (penalty missed) 77'		Farhan 18'	Stadium: Basra Sports City; Attendance: 0 Referee: Watheq Mohammed

21 March 2021 25	Naft Maysan	0 – 0	Al-Mina'a	Amarah
13:00 GMT				Stadium: Maysan Olympic Stadium; Attendance: 0 Referee: Mohammed Salman

3 April 2021 26	Al-Mina'a	1 – 0	Al-Sinaat Al-Kahrabaiya	Basra
13:00 GMT	Ashour 78'			Stadium: Basra Sports City; Attendance: 0 Referee: Mohanad Qasim

9 April 2021 27	Al-Karkh	2 – 1	Al-Mina'a	Baghdad
12:00 GMT	Khalil 2' (pen.); Abdul-Karim 90+4'		Adnan 27'	Stadium: Al-Saher Ahmed Radhi Stadium; Attendance: 0 Referee: Zaid Thamer

18 April 2021 28	Al-Zawra'a	1 – 1	Al-Mina'a	Baghdad
18:00 GMT	Kamel 6'		M'baï 42'	Stadium: Al-Shaab Stadium; Attendance: 0 Referee: Watheq Mohammed

28 April 2021 29	Al-Mina'a	3 – 0	Erbil	Basra
19:00 GMT	Malik 18'; Khaled 85'; Nasser 90+1'			Stadium: Basra Sports City; Referee: Feed Karim

11 May 2021 30	Amanat Baghdad	0 – 1	Al-Mina'a	Baghdad
13:05 GMT			Mohammed 86'	Stadium: Amanat Baghdad Stadium; Attendance: 0 Referee: Watheq Mohammed

16 May 2021 31	Al-Mina'a	2 – 3	Al-Shorta	Basra
19:30 GMT	Malik 24' (pen.); Jassim 71'; Abdul-Hussein (red card) 88'; Khaled (yellow card) (yellow-red card) 90+2'		Qasim 43'; Dawood 52'; Attwan (penalty missed) 76', 84'; Natiq (yellow card) (yellow-red card) 89'	Stadium: Basra Sports City; Attendance: 0 Referee: Mohammed Salman

21 June 2021 32	Al-Mina'a	3 – 1	Zakho	Basra
19:35 GMT	Jassim 5' (pen.); Adnan 30', 37'; Moumouni (penalty missed) 90+4'		Jawad 46' (pen.)	Stadium: Basra Sports City; Attendance: 0 Referee: Amjad Subhi

25 June 2021 33	Al-Naft	1 – 1	Al-Mina'a	Baghdad
13:45 GMT	Karim 18'		Jassim 32'	Stadium: Al-Taji Stadium; Attendance: 0 Referee: Haitham Mohammed Ali

29 June 2021 34	Al-Mina'a	2 – 1	Al-Qasim	Basra
16:30 GMT	Younis 29'; Ahmed 62'		Hachim 90+4'	Stadium: Basra Sports City; Attendance: 0 Referee: Feed Karim

4 July 2021 35	Al-Talaba	4 – 2	Al-Mina'a	Baghdad
16:30 GMT	Ramadhan 9', 27', 31'; Jaffal 52'		Moumouni 74'; Jassim 85' (pen.)	Stadium: Al-Shaab Stadium; Attendance: 0 Referee: Watheq Mohammed

8 July 2021 36	Al-Diwaniya	1 – 0	Al-Mina'a	Diwaniya
14:00 GMT	Mohammed 19'			Stadium: Al-Diwaniya Stadium

12 July 2021 37	Al-Mina'a	2 – 0	Al-Quwa Al-Jawiya	Basra
16:30 GMT	Yas 53'; Adnan 81'			Stadium: Basra Sports City; Attendance: 0 Referee: Mohammed Riyadh

18 July 2021 38	Al-Mina'a	1 – 1	Naft Al-Wasat	Basra
16:30 GMT	Yas 67'		Jassim 4'	Stadium: Basra Sports City; Attendance: 0 Referee: Karrar Jafar

=== FA Cup ===
18 November 2020 Round of 32	Al-Jamahir	0 – 1	Al-Mina'a	Babil
15:00 GMT			Ashoor 3'; Yahya (yellow card) 65'	Stadium: Al-Kifl Stadium; Attendance: 0 Referee: Salam Juma

25 March 2021 Round of 16	Al-Mina'a	3 – 0 (w/o)	Newroz	Basra
15:00 GMT				Stadium: Basra Sports City; Attendance: 0

4 June 2021 Quarter-finals	Al-Shorta	2 – 1	Al-Mina'a	Baghdad
17:00 GMT	Yousif 27'; Al-Youssef 31'		Jassim 34'	Stadium: Al-Shaab Stadium; Attendance: 0 Referee: Watheq Mohammed

== Squad statistics ==
=== Goalscorers ===
Rank	No.	Pos	Nat	Name	Premier League	FA Cup	Total
1	7	MF	(Iraq)	Hussein Younis	10	0	10
2	17	FW	(Cameroon)	Rostand Junior M'baï	7	0	7
3	10	MF	(Iraq)	Hossam Malik	6	0	6
3	55	MF	(Iraq)	Saif Jassim	5	1	6
5	3	DF	(Iraq)	Hamza Adnan	4	0	4
6	99	FW	(Iraq)	Mohammed Shokan	2	0	2
6	18	FW	(Iraq)	Salem Ahmed	2	0	2
6	33	MF	(Iraq)	Abbas Yas	2	0	2
6	5	MF	(Iraq)	Ahmed Mohsin Ashoor	1	1	2
9	9	FW	(Iraq)	Emad Mohsin	1	0	1
9	13	MF	(Iraq)	Ammar Abdul-Hussein	1	0	1
9	35	DF	(Iraq)	Ahmed Khaled	1	0	1
9	4	DF	(Iraq)	Karrar Mohammed	1	0	1
9	9	FW	(Iraq)	Murtaja Adel Nasser	1	0	1
9	28	MF	(Niger)	Abdoul Magid Moumouni	1	0	1
Own goals					0	0	0
TOTALS					45	2	47

Last updated: 18 July 2021

=== Penalties ===
Date	Name	Opponent	Result
23 December 2020	(Iraq) Hossam Malik	Erbil	Yes
7 January 2021	(Iraq) Saif Jassim	Zakho	Yes
21 January 2021	(Iraq) Saif Jassim	Al-Qasim	No
5 March 2021	(Iraq) Mohammed Shokan	Al-Kahrabaa	Yes
11 March 2021	(Iraq) Mohammed Shokan	Naft Al-Basra	No
16 May 2021	(Iraq) Hossam Malik	Al-Shorta	Yes
21 June 2021	(Iraq) Saif Jassim	Zakho	Yes
21 June 2021	(Niger) Abdoul Madjid Moumouni	Zakho	No
4 July 2021	(Iraq) Saif Jassim	Al-Talaba	Yes

== Overall statistics ==
	League	Cup	Total Stats
Games played	38	3	40
Games won	12	2	14
Games drawn	13	0	13
Games lost	13	1	14
Goals scored	45	2	47
Goals conceded	44	2	46
Goal difference	+1	0	+1
Clean sheets	11	2	13
Yellow Cards	40	0	40
Red Cards	3	0	3

Last updated: 18 July 2021
