= 2005–06 Al-Mina'a SC season =

Al-Mina'a SC
2005–06 season
- Chairman: Hadi Ahmed
- Manager: Aqeel Hato
- Ground: Al Mina'a Stadium
- Premier League: 10th
- AFC Champions League: Group stage
- Top goalscorer: League: Nawaf Falah (7 goals); All: Nawaf Falah (9 goals)
Home colours	Away colours

The 2005–06 season was Al-Minaa's 30th season in the Iraqi Premier League, having featured in all 32 editions of the competition except two. Al-Minaa participated in the Iraqi Premier League and the AFC Champions League.

They entered this season having finished in 2nd place in the league in the 2004–05 season, but this season was less successful as the club ranked in 10th place out of 28 teams. In the AFC Champions League, Al-Minaa were eliminated in the group stage where they earned their first ever points in an AFC competition with draws against Mash'al and Al-Hilal.

== Squad ==
Note: Flags indicate national team as defined under FIFA eligibility rules; some limited exceptions apply. Players may hold more than one non-FIFA nationality.

No.	Pos.	Nation	Player
1	GK	(Iraq) IRQ	Saddam Salman
2	DF	(Iraq) IRQ	Sajjad Abdul Kadhim
3	DF	(Iraq) IRQ	Jihad Madlool
4	DF	(Iraq) IRQ	Emad Aoda (captain)
5	DF	(Iraq) IRQ	Bahaa Abdul Lateef
6	DF	(Iraq) IRQ	Ali Jassim
7	MF	(Iraq) IRQ	Ghazi Fahad
8	FW	(Iraq) IRQ	Mokhlus Abdul Sattar
9	FW	(Iraq) IRQ	Nasser Talla Dahilan
10	FW	(Iraq) IRQ	Ehsan Hadi
11	MF	(Iraq) IRQ	Nayef Falah
12	GK	(Iraq) IRQ	Medhat Abdul Hussein

No.	Pos.	Nation	Player
13	DF	(Iraq) IRQ	Alaa Abdul Hussein
14	DF	(Iraq) IRQ	Nawaf Sallal
15	MF	(Iraq) IRQ	Sattar Jabbar
16	MF	(Iraq) IRQ	Bashar Hadi Ahmed
18	MF	(Iraq) IRQ	Hussein Mohsin
20	GK	(Iraq) IRQ	Ismail Hashim
21	MF	(Iraq) IRQ	Sajjad Abdul Nabi
22	FW	(Iraq) IRQ	Hussam Ibrahim
25	FW	(Iraq) IRQ	Nawaf Falah
26	DF	(Iraq) IRQ	Muneer Hammoud
28	DF	(Iraq) IRQ	Haider Naeem
30	FW	(Iraq) IRQ	Osama Shayyal

== Iraqi Premier League ==
=== Summary table ===
Overall								Home						Away					
Pld	W	D	L	GF	GA	GD	Pts	W	D	L	GF	GA	GD	W	D	L	GF	GA	GD
16	9	4	3	26	16	+10	31	7	1	0	20	7	+13	2	3	3	6	9	−3

Last updated: 11 May 2006.
Source: Goalzz.com

=== Matches ===
==== Group stage ====
4 November 2005 1	Al-Mina'a	4 – 3	Karbalaa	Basra
11:30 GMT	Abdul Kadhim 40' (pen.), 85' (pen.); Sallal 60'; Falah 75'		Naeem 3'; Abbas 48'; Barrak 80'	Stadium: Al Mina'a Stadium

11 November 2005 2	Al-Kut	0 – 0	Al-Mina'a	Kut
11:30 GMT				Stadium: Al Kut Stadium

18 November 2005 3	Al-Samawa	1 – 2	Al-Mina'a	Samawa
11:30 GMT	Abdul Karim 66'		Shayyal 77'; Falah 90+2'	Stadium: As Samawah Stadium

25 November 2005 4	Al-Mina'a	3 – 0	Al-Shatra	Basra
11:30 GMT	Sallal 39'; Falah 53'; Aoda 57'			Stadium: Al Mina'a Stadium

4 November 2005 5	Al-Mina'a	3 – 1	Naft Al-Junoob	Basra
11:30 GMT	Shayyal 13' (pen.); Abdul Kadhim 47'; Falah 67'		Aasi 60' (pen.)	Stadium: Al Mina'a Stadium

9 December 2005 6	Maysan	0 – 0	Al-Mina'a	Amarah
11:30 GMT				Stadium: Maysan Stadium

13 January 2006 7	Karbalaa	2 – 0	Al-Mina'a	Karbalaa
11:30 GMT	Barrak 35'; Abbas 83'			Stadium: Karbala Stadium

16 January 2006 8	Al-Shatra	1 – 1	Al-Mina'a	Nasiriyah
11:30 GMT	Hussein 13'		Fahad 43'	Stadium: Al-Shatra Stadium

20 January 2006 9	Al-Mina'a	3 – 0	Al-Kut	Basra
11:30 GMT	Falah 45'; Hadi 65', 77'			Stadium: Al Mina'a Stadium

23 January 2006 10	Naft Al-Janoob	1 – 3	Al-Mina'a	Basra
11:30 GMT	Saadi 86'		Hadi 34', 53'; Falah 48'	Stadium: Naft Al-Janoob Stadium

30 January 2006 11	Al-Mina'a	2 – 0	Maysan	Basra
11:30 GMT	Abdul Kadhim 72' (pen.); Tallaa 90+3'			Stadium: Al Mina'a Stadium

3 February 2006 12	Al-Mina'a	1 – 0	Al-Samawa	Basra
11:30 GMT	Falah 79'			Stadium: Al Mina'a Stadium

==== Elite stage ====
31 March 2006 13	Samaraa	1 – 0	Al-Mina'a	Samarra
11:30 GMT	Shaker 47'			Stadium: Samarra Stadium

7 April 2006 14	Al-Mina'a	2 – 2	Erbil	Basra
11:30 GMT	Tallaa 13'; Abdul Hussein 87'		Hassan 27'; Abdul Wahed 72'	Stadium: Al Mina'a Stadium

20 April 2006 15	Al-Mina'a	2 – 1	Samaraa	Basra
11:30 GMT	Abdul Hussein 35'; Falah 41'			Stadium: Al Mina'a Stadium

11 May 2006 16	Erbil	3 – 0	Al-Mina'a	Erbil
11:30 GMT	Sabbar 47'; Qaraman 72'; Abdul Rahman 81'			Stadium: Franso Hariri Stadium

== AFC Champions League ==
=== Group stage ===
Team	Pld	W	D	L	GF	GA	GD	Pts
(United Arab Emirates) Al Ain	6	4	1	1	10	6	+4	13
(Saudi Arabia) Al-Hilal	6	3	1	2	12	7	+5	10
(Uzbekistan) Mash'al	6	2	2	2	7	11	−4	8
(Iraq) Al-Mina'a	6	0	2	4	6	11	−5	2

Source: flashscore.com

8 March 2006 1	Al-Mina'a (Iraq)	0 – 1	(Uzbekistan) Mash'al	Kuwait City
11:30 GMT	Abdul Lateef (yellow card) 51'	Report	Xolmurodov 31'; Qodirov (yellow card) 34'; Klishin (yellow card) 86'	Stadium: Sabah Al Salem Stadium; Attendance: 200; Referee: Mukhtar Al Yarimi (Yemen)

22 March 2006 2	Al-Hilal (Saudi Arabia)	3 – 1	(Iraq) Al-Mina'a	Riyadh
11:30 GMT	Tavares 31'; Al-Anbar 60'; Al-Qahtani 90+1'	Report	Hammoud 45'; Sallal (yellow card) 76'	Stadium: King Fahd II Stadium; Attendance: 23,000; Referee: Saad Mane (Kuwait)

12 April 2006 3	Al Ain (United Arab Emirates)	2 – 1	(Iraq) Al-Mina'a	Al Ain
11:30 GMT	Jestrović 14', 37' (pen.), (yellow card) 90+1'	Report	Sallal 15'; Abdul Kadhim (yellow card) 28'; Falah (yellow card) 29'; Jassim (yellow card) 58'	Stadium: Tahnoun Bin Mohamed Stadium; Attendance: 10,000; Referee: Muhsen Basma (Syria)

26 April 2006 4	Al-Mina'a (Iraq)	1 – 2	(United Arab Emirates) Al Ain	Kuwait City
11:30 GMT	Falah 7'; Abdul Hussein (yellow card) 49'; Sallal (yellow card) 59'	Report	Kelly 64' (pen.); Diaky 66'	Stadium: Al-Sadaqua Walsalam Stadium; Attendance: 1,000; Referee: Masoud Moradi (Iran)

3 May 2006 5	Mash'al (Uzbekistan)	2 – 2	(Iraq) Al-Mina'a	Qarshi
11:30 GMT	Xasanov 30'; Mirxoldirshoyev 72'	Report	Abdul Nabi 12'; Abdul Sattar (yellow card) 15', (goal) 60'; Salman (yellow card) 44'; Mohsen (yellow card) 90+3'	Stadium: Nasaf Stadium; Attendance: 3,000; Referee: Arambakade Gedara (Sri Lanka)

17 May 2006 6	Al-Mina'a (Iraq)	1 – 1	(Saudi Arabia) Al-Hilal	Kuwait City
11:30 GMT	Falah 34', (yellow card) 90+4'; Salman (yellow card) 90'	Report	Giovanni 48'; Tavares (yellow card) 90+5'	Stadium: Sabah Al Salem Stadium; Attendance: 2,000; Referee: Mohammed Kousa (Syria)

== Statistics ==
=== Goalscorers ===
Rank	Pos.	Nationality	No.	Name	Iraqi Premier League	AFC Champions League	Total
1	FW	(Iraq)	25	Nawaf Falah	7	2	9
2	FW	(Iraq)	10	Ehsan Hadi	4	0	4
2	DF	(Iraq)	2	Sajjad Abdul Kadhim	4	0	4
2	DF	(Iraq)	14	Nawaf Sallal	3	1	4
3	FW	(Iraq)	9	Nasser Talla Dahilan	2	0	2
3	DF	(Iraq)	13	Alaa Abdul Hussein	2	0	2
3	FW	(Iraq)	30	Osama Shayyal	2	0	2
4	MF	(Iraq)	7	Ghazi Fahad	1	0	1
4	DF	(Iraq)	4	Emad Aoda	1	0	1
4	DF	(Iraq)	26	Muneer Hammoud	0	1	1
4	FW	(Iraq)	8	Mokhlus Abdul Sattar	0	1	1
4	MF	(Iraq)	21	Sajjad Abdul Nabi	0	1	1
Own goals					0	0	0
TOTALS					26	6	32

Last updated: 17 May 2006

=== Overall statistics ===
	Iraqi League	AFC Champions League	Total Stats
Games played	16	6	22
Games won	9	0	9
Games drawn	4	2	6
Games lost	3	4	7
Goals scored	26	6	32
Goals conceded	16	11	27
Goal difference	+10	-5	+5
Clean sheets	6	0	6

Last updated: 17 May 2006
