= 2021–22 Al-Mina'a SC season =

Al-Mina'a SC
2021–22 season
- Chairman: Jalil Hanoon
- Manager: Ali Wahab
- Ground: Basra Sports City
- Premier League: 19th (relegated)
- FA Cup: Round of 32
- Top goalscorer: League: Salem Ahmed (7 goals); All: Salem Ahmed (7 goals)
Home colours	Away colours

The 2021–22 season will be Al-Minaa's 46th season in the Iraqi Premier League, having featured in all 48 editions of the competition except two. Al-Minaa are participating in the Iraqi Premier League and the Iraq FA Cup.

Al-Mina'a will be looking to wrestle back the title they won in the 1977–78 season.

== Squad ==
Note: Flags indicate national team as defined under FIFA eligibility rules; some limited exceptions apply. Players may hold more than one non-FIFA nationality.

No.	Pos.	Nation	Player
1	GK	IRQ	Mujtaba Mohammed
4	DF	IRQ	Muntadher Abdul Sada
5	MF	IRQ	Sadeq Sami
7	MF	IRQ	Fadhel Wasmi
9	FW	IRQ	Thulfiqar Ayid
10	FW	IRQ	Mohammed Jabbar Shokan
11	FW	IRQ	Abdullah Wasfi
13	MF	IRQ	Ali Sattar
14	MF	IRQ	Ahmed Salam
15	DF	IRQ	Ali Lateef
16	MF	IRQ	Ali Shawqi
17	MF	IRQ	Ahmed Matar
18	FW	IRQ	Salem Ahmed
19	DF	IRQ	Hassan Odah
21	GK	IRQ	Ahmed Hamid
22	GK	IRQ	Ali Faisal
23	DF	IRQ	Ahmed Yahya
24	MF	IRQ	Ahmed Jabbar

No.	Pos.	Nation	Player
25	MF	IRQ	Sajed Abbas Hashim
26	MF	IRQ	Ibrahim Naeem
27	DF	IRQ	Abdul Muhaimin Jabbar
28	MF	IRQ	Hamza Hadi Ahmed
29	DF	IRQ	Karrar Al-Amir Ali
31	GK	IRQ	Murtadha Sami
33	MF	IRQ	Abbas Yas
34	DF	IRQ	Abdullah Abdul Amir
35	DF	IRQ	Ahmed Khaled (Captain)
44	MF	SLE	Khalifa Jabbie
45	DF	TUN	Afif Jebali
50	MF	IRQ	Murtadha Shaker
55	MF	IRQ	Hussein Qasim
61	MF	YEM	Nasser Al-Gahwashi
93	MF	TUN	Mohamed Ali Ragoubi
96	FW	BRA	Augusto Neto
97	DF	IRQ	Haider Abdul Salam

== Transfers ==
=== In ===
Date	Pos.	Name	From	Fee	Ref.
5 August 2021	ST	(Iraq) Thulfiqar Ayid	(Iraq) Naft Al-Wasat	Free transfer	
11 August 2021	AM	(Iraq) Sadeq Sami	(Iraq) Al-Karkh	Free transfer	
15 August 2021	RW	(Iraq) Fadhel Wasmi	(Iraq) Masafi Al-Janoob	Free transfer	
24 August 2021	CB	(Iraq) Ali Lateef	(Iraq) Al-Talaba	Free transfer	
24 August 2021	CB	(Iraq) Muntadher Abdul Sada	(Iraq) Al-Kahrabaa	Free transfer	
24 August 2021	DM	(Iraq) Ahmed Jabbar	(Iraq) Amanat Baghdad	Free transfer	
25 August 2021	GK	(Iraq) Ali Faisal	(Iraq) Amanat Baghdad	Free transfer	
26 August 2021	GK	(Iraq) Ahmed Hamid	(Iraq) Al-Samawa	Free transfer	
26 August 2021	LW	(Iraq) Ali Sattar	(Iraq) Al-Quwa Al-Jawiya	Free transfer	
26 August 2021	DM	(Iraq) Ibrahim Naeem	(Iraq) Al-Talaba	Free transfer	
26 August 2021	RB	(Iraq) Haider Abdul Salam	(Iraq) Al-Qasim	Free transfer	
27 August 2021	CM	(Iraq) Hamza Hadi Ahmed	(Iraq) Al-Bahri	Free transfer	
27 August 2021	LB	(Iraq) Hassan Odah	(Iraq) Masafi Al-Janoob	Free transfer	
27 August 2021	LW	(Iraq) Ahmed Matar Khalaf	(Iraq) Masafi Al-Janoob	Free transfer	
27 August 2021	LB	(Iraq) Abdul Muhaimin Jabbar	(Iraq) Naft Maysan	Free transfer	
3 September 2021	AM	(Tunisia) Mohamed Ali Ragoubi	(Tunisia) JS Kairouan	Free transfer	
7 September 2021	CB	(Tunisia) Afif Jebali	(Tunisia) Espérance ST	Free transfer	
8 September 2021	RW	(Iraq) Ahmed Salam	(Iraq) Zakho	Free transfer	
10 September 2021	DM	(Sierra Leone) Khalifa Jabbie	(Moldova) Sfîntul Gheorghe	Free transfer	
10 September 2021	ST	(Brazil) Augusto Neto	(Hong Kong) Rangers	Free transfer	
15 September 2021	CM	(Yemen) Nasser Al-Gahwashi	(Iraq) Naft Maysan	Free transfer	
17 September 2021	CM	(Iraq) Hussein Qasim	(Iraq) Al-Karkh	Free transfer	
18 September 2021	CB	(Iraq) Abdullah Abdul Amir	(Iraq) Naft Al-Wasat	Free transfer	

=== Out ===
Date	Pos.	Name	To	Fee	Ref.
5 August 2021	ST	(Cameroon) Rostand Junior M'baï	Unattached	Released	
5 August 2021	GK	(Iraq) Hussein Saleh Mahdi	Unattached	Released	
5 August 2021	CB	(Iraq) Ali Qasim	Unattached	Released	
10 August 2021	GK	(Iraq) Yassin Karim	(Iraq) Al-Shorta	Free transfer	
10 August 2021	CB	(Iraq) Karrar Mohammed	(Iraq) Al-Naft	Free transfer	
10 August 2021	GK	(Iraq) Hussam Mahdi	(Iraq) Naft Al-Basra	Free transfer	
17 August 2021	DM	(Niger) Abdoul Madjid Moumouni	(Iraq) Al-Shorta	Free transfer	
21 August 2021	DM	(Iraq) Saif Jassim	(Iraq) Al-Talaba	Free transfer	
21 August 2021	LB	(Iraq) Hamza Adnan	(Iraq) Al-Talaba	Free transfer	
22 August 2021	ST	(Iraq) Sajjad Saeed	(Iraq) Naft Al-Basra	Free transfer	
26 August 2021	DM	(Senegal) Idrissa Niang	(Iraq) Al-Talaba	Free transfer	
26 August 2021	RB	(Iraq) Aqeel Mahdi	(Iraq) Naft Al-Basra	Free transfer	
28 August 2021	AM	(Iraq) Ahmed Mohsin Ashoor	(Iraq) Al-Najaf	Free transfer	
1 September 2021	CB	(Iraq) Abbas Badie	(Iraq) Naft Maysan	Free transfer	
2 September 2021	RW	(Iraq) Hussein Younis	(Iraq) Al-Shorta	Free transfer	

== Personnel ==
=== Technical staff ===
Position	Name	Nationality
Manager:	Qusay Munir	(Iraq)
Assistant coach:	Uday Omran	(Iraq)
Assistant coach:	Taiseer Abdul-Hussein	(Iraq)
Assistant coach:	Ihsan Hadi	(Iraq)
Goalkeeping coach:	Ali Hussein Jalil	(Iraq)
Fitness coach:	Ali Mohammed	(Iraq)
Team doctor:	Fares Abdullah	(Iraq)
Sport consultant:	Rahim Bakr	(Iraq)
Team supervisor:	Jihad Madlool	(Iraq)
Administrator:	Salah Khalil	(Iraq)

Updated to match played 21 August 2021
Source: almirbad.com

=== Board members ===
Position	Name	Nationality
President:	Mohammad Jaber Al-Jaberi	(Iraq)
Secretary:	Taher Balas	(Iraq)
Treasurer:	Ali Kadhim Mubarak	(Iraq)
Member of the Board:	Nazar Taha Humoud	(Iraq)
Member of the Board:	Jihad Madlool Obaid	(Iraq)
Member of the Board:	Ahmed Hamed Al-Jaberi	(Iraq)
Member of the Board:	Nabeel Abdul Ameer Jamil	(Iraq)
Member of the Board:	Jalil Hanoon	(Iraq)
Member of the Board:	Hani Abed Waleed	(Iraq)

Updated to match played 8 December 2018
Source: Alsumaria.tv

== Stadium ==
During the previous seasons, the stadium of Al-Mina'a was demolished. A company will build a new stadium that will be completed in the end of 2021. Since the team can't play their games at Al Mina'a Stadium, they will be playing at Basra Sports City during this season.

== Pre-season and friendlies ==
Win Draw Loss Fixtures

5 September 2021 Friendly	Al-Kahrabaa	2–3	Al-Mina'a	Baghdad
14:00 GMT	(o.g.)	Report	Wasfi; Ayid	Stadium: Al-Kahrabaa Stadium

7 September 2021 Friendly	Al-Sinaa	2–3	Al-Mina'a	Baghdad
14:00 GMT	Goal		Mazin; Al-Amir; Ayid	Stadium: Al-Taji Stadium

9 September 2021 Friendly	Iraq U20	0–1	Al-Mina'a	Baghdad
13:30 GMT		Report	Sami	Stadium: Al-Kahrabaa Stadium

11 September 2021 Friendly	Al-Quwa Al-Jawiya	0–0	Al-Mina'a	Baghdad
13:30 GMT		Report		Stadium: Al-Quwa Al-Jawiya Stadium

15 September 2021 Friendly	Al-Mina'a	1–1	Naft Al-Basra	Basra
13:30 GMT	S.Ahmed		H.Ahmed	Stadium: Basra Sports City

5 October 2021 Friendly	Al-Mina'a	1–0	Masafi Al-Janoob	Basra
13:30 GMT	Ragoubi			Stadium: Basra Sports City

== Competitions ==
=== Overview ===
Competition	First match	Last match	Starting round	Record							
Competition	First match	Last match	Starting round	Pld	W	D	L	GF	GA	GD	Win %
Premier League	21 September 2021	3 July 2022	Matchday 1	38	3	21	14	33	49	−16	7.89
FA Cup	9 November 2021	9 November 2021	Round of 32	1	0	0	1	1	2	−1	0.00
Total				39	3	21	15	34	51	−17	7.69

Last updated: 3 July 2022
Source: Competitions

=== Premier League ===
==== League table ====
Pos	Team	Pld	W	D	L	GF	GA	GD	Pts	Qualification or relegation
16	Al-Sinaa	38	8	17	13	30	37	−7	41 (Note: Al-Qasim finished ahead of Al-Sinaa on head-to-head points: Al-Qasim 0–0 Al-Sinaa, Al-Sinaa 0–1 Al-Qasim.)	
17	Al-Diwaniya	38	10	9	19	33	51	−18	39 (Note: Al-Diwaniya finished ahead of Amanat Baghdad on head-to-head points: Al-Diwaniya 2–0 Amanat Baghdad, Amanat Baghdad 0–1 Al-Diwaniya.)	
18	Amanat Baghdad (R)	38	9	12	17	32	41	−9	39	Qualification for the relegation play-off
19	Al-Minaa (R)	38	3	21	14	33	49	−16	30	Relegation to the Iraqi First Division League
20	Samarra (R)	38	1	9	28	20	70	−50	12	Relegation to the Iraqi First Division League

Source: IPFL
Rules for classification: 1) points; 2) head-to-head points; 3) head-to-head goal difference; 4) goal difference; 5) number of wins; 6) number of goals scored.
(R) Relegated

==== Matches ====
21 September 2021 1	Al-Mina'a	0–0	Erbil	Basra
15:00 GMT				Stadium: Basra Sports City; Referee: Mohanad Qasim Sarray

26 September 2021 2	Naft Al-Basra	3–1	Al-Mina'a	Basra
17:30 GMT	Youmbi 2'; Abdul-Amir 51'; Malik 79' (pen.)		Ayid 62'	Stadium: Basra Sports City; Referee: Mohammed Sadeq

1 October 2021 3	Al-Mina'a	0–2	Zakho	Basra
15:00 GMT			Waleed 33'; Esquerdinha 86'	Stadium: Basra Sports City; Referee: Muhannad Manaf

16 October 2021 4	Al-Mina'a	0–0	Al-Naft	Basra
14:15 GMT				Stadium: Basra Sports City

21 October 2021 5	Naft Al-Wasat	2–0	Al-Mina'a	Karbala
16:35 GMT				Stadium: Karbalaa International Stadium

26 October 2021 6	Al-Mina'a	1–1	Al-Quwa Al-Jawiya	Basra
16:30 GMT				Stadium: Basra Sports City

30 October 2021 7	Al-Sinaa	1–0	Al-Mina'a	Baghdad
14:00 GMT				Stadium: Al-Sinaa Stadium

4 November 2021 8	Al-Mina'a	2–2	Al-Qasim	Basra
11:55 GMT				Stadium: Basra Sports City

15 November 2021 9	Samarra	1–1	Al-Mina'a	Saladin
11:30 GMT				Stadium: Samarra Stadium

21 November 2021 10	Al-Mina'a	1–2	Naft Maysan	Basra
17:10 GMT				Stadium: Basra Sports City

27 November 2021 11	Newroz	1–1	Al-Mina'a	Sulaymaniyah
14:00 GMT				Stadium: Zanko Stadium

11 December 2021 12	Al-Karkh	1–1	Al-Mina'a	Baghdad
12:00 GMT				Stadium: Al-Saher Ahmed Radhi Stadium

17 December 2021 13	Al-Mina'a	1–1	Al-Zawra'a	Basra
13:00 GMT				Stadium: Basra Sports City

21 December 2021 14	Al-Mina'a	1–1	Amanat Baghdad	Basra
11:00 GMT				Stadium: Basra Sports City

26 December 2021 15	Al-Shorta	3–1	Al-Mina'a	Baghdad
13:00 GMT				Stadium: Al-Shaab Stadium

31 December 2021 16	Al-Mina'a	1–1	Al-Najaf	Basra
15:00 GMT				Stadium: Basra Sports City

6 January 2022 17	Al-Mina'a	3–0	Al-Diwaniya	Basra
16:45 GMT				Stadium: Basra Sports City

12 January 2022 18	Al-Talaba	0–0	Al-Mina'a	Baghdad
14:00 GMT				Stadium: Al-Shaab Stadium

16 January 2022 19	Al-Kahrabaa	1–0	Al-Mina'a	Baghdad
11:00 GMT				Stadium: Al-Taji Stadium

9 February 2022 20	Erbil	3-0	Al-Mina'a	Erbil
13:45 GMT				Stadium: Franso Hariri Stadium

14 February 2022 21	Al-Mina'a	0–1	Naft Al-Basra	Basra
17:20 GMT				Stadium: Basra Sports City

19 February 2022 22	Zakho	0–0	Al-Mina'a	Zakho
10:45 GMT				Stadium: Zakho International Stadium

24 February 2022 23	Al-Naft	4–1	Al-Mina'a	Baghdad
10:30 GMT				Stadium: Al-Taji Stadium

3 March 2022 24	Al-Mina'a	3–3	Naft Al-Wasat	Basra
13:00 GMT				Stadium: Basra Sports City

9 March 2022 25	Al-Quwa Al-Jawiya	2–1	Al-Mina'a	Baghdad
16:15 GMT				Stadium: Al-Shaab Stadium

5 April 2022 26	Al-Mina'a	0–1	Al-Sinaa	Basra
19:00 GMT				Stadium: Basra Sports City

14 April 2022 27	Al-Qasim	2–1	Al-Mina'a	Babil
13:35 GMT				Stadium: Al Kifl Stadium

21 April 2022 28	Al-Mina'a	1–1	Samarra	Basra
19:00 GMT				Stadium: Basra Sports City

28 April 2022 29	Naft Maysan	1–1	Al-Mina'a	Amarah
19:00 GMT				Stadium: Maysan Olympic Stadium

5 May 2022 30	Al-Mina'a	1–1	Newroz	Basra
14:30 GMT				Stadium: Basra Sports City

11 May 31	Al-Mina'a	0–0	Al-Karkh	Basra
16:00 GMT				Stadium: Basra Sports City

19 May 2022 32	Al-Zawra'a	1–1	Al-Mina'a	Baghdad
15:30 GMT				Stadium: Al-Shaab Stadium

28 May 2022 33	Amanat Baghdad	0–1	Al-Mina'a	Baghdad
13:00 GMT				Stadium: Amanat Baghdad Stadium

2 June 2022 34	Al-Mina'a	1–1	Al-Shorta	Basra
16:00 GMT				Stadium: Basra Sports City

8 June 2022 35	Al-Najaf	2–2	Al-Mina'a	Baghdad
13:45 GMT				Stadium: Al-Saher Ahmed Radhi Stadium

15 June 2022 36	Al-Diwaniya	1–0	Al-Mina'a	Diwaniya
14:00 GMT				Stadium: Al-Diwaniya Stadium

22 June 2022 37	Al-Mina'a	1–1	Al-Talaba	Basra
16:35 GMT				Stadium: Basra Sports City

3 July 2022 38	Al-Mina'a	3–1	Al-Kahrabaa	Basra
15:00 GMT				Stadium: Basra Sports City

=== FA Cup ===
9 November 2021 Round of 32	Al-Mina'a	1–2	Al-Karkh	Basra
14:00 GMT				Stadium: Basra Sports City

== Squad statistics ==
=== Goalscorers ===
Rank	No.	Pos	Nat	Name	Premier League	FA Cup	Total
1	18	FW	(Iraq)	Salem Ahmed	7	0	7
2	61	MF	(Yemen)	Nasser Al-Gahwashi	5	0	5
3	8	FW	(Iraq)	Manar Taha	4	0	4
3	10	FW	(Iraq)	Mohammed Shokan	4	0	4
5	6	MF	(Jordan)	Mehdi Alamah	2	0	2
5	11	MF	(Iraq)	Abdullah Wasfi	2	0	2
5	28	MF	(Iraq)	Hamza Hadi Ahmed	2	0	2
8	3	DF	(Iraq)	Ali Helo	1	0	1
8	9	FW	(Iraq)	Thulfiqar Ayid	1	0	1
8	23	DF	(Iraq)	Ahmed Yahya	1	0	1
8	25	MF	(Iraq)	Sajid Abbas Hashim	1	0	1
8	29	DF	(Iraq)	Karrar Al-Amir Ali	1	0	1
8	33	MF	(Iraq)	Abbas Yas	1	0	1
8	35	DF	(Iraq)	Ahmed Khalid	1	0	1
Own goals					0	0	0
TOTALS					33	1	34

Last updated: 3 July 2022
