= 1989–90 Iraq FA Cup =

Tournament details
- Country: Iraq
- Dates: 4 December 1989 – 28 April 1990
- Teams: 69

Final positions
- Champions: Al-Zawraa (6th title)
- Runners-up: Al-Shabab

The 1989–90 Iraq FA Cup was the 13th edition of the Iraq FA Cup as a club competition. The tournament was won by Al-Zawraa for the sixth time, beating Al-Shabab 2–1 on penalties in the final after a 0–0 draw. The first three rounds were between teams from the lower divisions, before the top-flight clubs began to enter at the round of 32.

== Bracket ==
=== First preliminary round ===
Team 1	Agg.	Team 2	1st leg	2nd leg
Duhok	W–L	Qaraqosh		
Al-Thawra	W–L	Al-Tameem		
Al-Mosul	W–L	Sirwan		
Brayati	W–L	Al-Karama		
Diyala	W–L	Al-Khalis		
Salahaddin	W–L	Al-Dawr		
Al-Salam	W–L	Wahid Huzairan		
Al-Nasr	W–L	Al-Falluja		
Al-Tijara	W–L	Al-Armeni		
Al-Jamahir	W–L	Al-Taff		
Al-Hilla	W–L	Al-Hindiya		
Babil	W–L	Al-Musayyib		
Al-Tadamon	W–L	Al-Kufa		
Al-Falastini	W–L	Al-Saqr Al-Arabi		
Al-Amana	W–L	Shabab Saddam		
Al-Qadisiya	L–W	Al-Qasim		
Naft Al-Junoob	W–L	Al-Shatra		
Al-Diwaniya	W–L	Al-Rafidain		
Al-Amara	W–L	Al-Hurriya		
Al-Numaniya	W–L	Al-Kut		
Al-Zubair	W–L	Al-Junoob		
Al-Minaa	W–L	Al-Ittihad		
Al-Samawa	W–L	Al-Hay		

=== Second preliminary round ===
The first legs were played on 16 October 1989, and the second legs were played on 30 October 1989.

Team 1	Agg.	Team 2	1st leg	2nd leg
Duhok	1–1 (5–6 p)	Al-Fotuwa	0–1	1–0
Al-Thawra	4–1	Al-Mosul	1–1	3–0
Brayati	5–1	Sulaymaniya	3–0	2–1
Diyala	0–3	Salahaddin	0–1	0–2
Al-Salam	3–2	Al-Athori	1–1	2–1
Al-Nasr	2–2 (a)	Al-Tijara	2–1	0–1
Al-Amara	2–1	Al-Numaniya	2–1	0–0
Al-Jamahir	3–1	Al-Kadhimiya	1–1	2–0
Al-Hilla	0–4	Al-Umal	0–1	0–3
Babil	2–1	Al-Yaqdha	1–0	1–1
Al-Tadamon	4–4 (a)	Al-Falastini	1–2	3–2
Al-Amana	3–1	Al-Midhatiya	1–0	2–1
Al-Minaa	1–0	Al-Samawa	0–0	1–0
Al-Nasiriya	2–2 (a)	Al-Diwaniya	0–1	2–1
Naft Al-Junoob	6–0	Al-Qasim	3–0	3–0
Al-Zubair	8–4	Al-Furat	5–1	3–3

=== Third preliminary round ===
The first legs were played on 6 November 1989, and the second legs were played on 20 November 1989.

Team 1	Agg.	Team 2	1st leg	2nd leg
Al-Thawra	1–3	Al-Fotuwa	1–0	0–3
Al-Tijara	2–1	Al-Salam	1–1	1–0
Brayati	2–3	Salahaddin	2–0	0–3
Al-Amara	0–1	Al-Nasiriya	0–0	0–1
Al-Jamahir	1–0	Al-Umal	0–0	1–0
Babil	6–5	Al-Tadamon	4–2	2–3
Al-Minaa	2–1	Al-Zubair	1–1	1–0
Al-Amana	2–3	Naft Al-Junoob	1–1	1–2

=== Final phase ===
First round 4–18 December 1989
Al-Tijara	1	1	2
Babil	1	0	1
Al-Shabab	4	0	4
Naft Al-Junoob	0	0	0
Al-Sinaa	5	1	6
Samarra	1	0	1
Al-Naft	2	4	6
Salahaddin	1	1	2
Al-Shorta	2	1	3
Al-Bahri	0	0	0
Al-Jaish	2	0	2
Al-Minaa	1	2	3

Round of 16; 8–22 January 1990
Al-Rasheed	0	2	2
Al-Tijara	1	2	3
Al-Shabab	1	1	2
Al-Jamahir	0	0	0
Al-Sinaa	3	0	3
Al-Fotuwa	0	1	1
Al-Talaba	1	1	2
Al-Sulaikh	0	3	3
Al-Zawraa	1	1	2
Al-Naft	0	1	1
Al-Shorta	0	2	2
Al-Minaa	0	0	0
Al-Najaf	2	2	4
Al-Nasiriya	0	1	1
Al-Tayaran	2	5	7
Erbil	0	0	0

Quarter-finals
Al-Shabab	1	3	4
Al-Tijara	0	0	0
Al-Sinaa (p)	0	1	1 (5)
Al-Sulaikh	0	1	1 (4)
Al-Zawraa	2	3	5
Al-Shorta	0	2	2
Al-Tayaran	1	4	5
Al-Najaf	1	1	2

Semi-finals
Al-Shabab	2	0	2
Al-Sinaa	0	1	1
Al-Zawraa (p)	0	1	1 (5)
Al-Tayaran	1	0	1 (4)

Final; 28 April 1990
Al-Zawraa (p)	0 (2)
Al-Shabab	0 (1)

== Matches ==
=== Final ===
28 April 1990

Al-Zawraa	0–0 (a.e.t.)	Al-Shabab
Penalties
Abid Nader (penalty missed); Saddam (penalty scored); Abdul-Hassan (penalty scored); Hadi (penalty missed); Thani (penalty missed)	2–1	(penalty missed) Jabbar; (penalty missed) I. Mohammed; (penalty missed) Jassim; (penalty scored) Aziz; (penalty missed) H. Mohammed

Al-Shaab Stadium, Baghdad
Attendance: 40,000
Referee: Subhi Raheem

Al-Zawraa	Al-Shabab

GK	(Iraq) Ahmad Jassim	(substituted off) 117'
DF	(Iraq) Mohammed Hussein Dhiab
DF	(Iraq) Ali Hadi
DF	(Iraq) Radhi Shenaishil (c)
DF	(Iraq) Sabah Abdul-Hassan
MF	(Iraq) Raed Khalil
MF	(Iraq) Ibrahim Abid Nader
MF	(Iraq) Abdul-Amir Naji
MF	(Iraq) Mohamed Jassim Mahdi
FW	(Iraq) Karim Saddam
FW	(Iraq) Saad Abdul-Wahid
Substitutes:
GK	(Iraq) Qasim Mohammed	(substituted on) 117'
	(Iraq) Faez Thani	Substituted on
Manager:
(Iraq) Falah Hassan

GK	(Iraq) Hashim Khamis
DF	(Iraq) Salim Hussein
DF	(Iraq) Karim Mohsen
DF	(Iraq) Raheem Mohsen
DF	(Iraq) Haitham Sabri
MF	(Iraq) Abid Ali Aziz
MF	(Iraq) Mahmoud Jassim
MF	(Iraq) Ismail Mohammed Sharif
MF	(Iraq) Qasim Nassif
FW	(Iraq) Haitham Mutaab
FW	(Iraq) Majeed Abdul-Ridha
Substitutes:
	(Iraq) Jamal Jabbar	Substituted on
	(Iraq) Haidar Mohammed	Substituted on
Manager:
(Iraq) Saad Hamza

Assistant referees:
Abbas Abdul-Raheem
Abdul-Qadir Abdul-Lateef
Fourth official:
Adel Al-Qassab

Iraq FA Cup
1989–90 winner
Al-Zawraa
6th title
