= Al-Tadamon SC =

Al-Tadamon SC may refer to:

- Al-Tadamon SC (Kuwait), a Kuwaiti professional football club based in Al Farwaniya
- Al-Tadamon SC (Saudi Arabia), a Saudi Arabian football team in Rafha playing
- Al-Tadamon SC (Iraq), an Iraqi football team based in Al-Najaf
