= Qarmat Ali =

Qarmat Ali Al-Qarmah
- Town
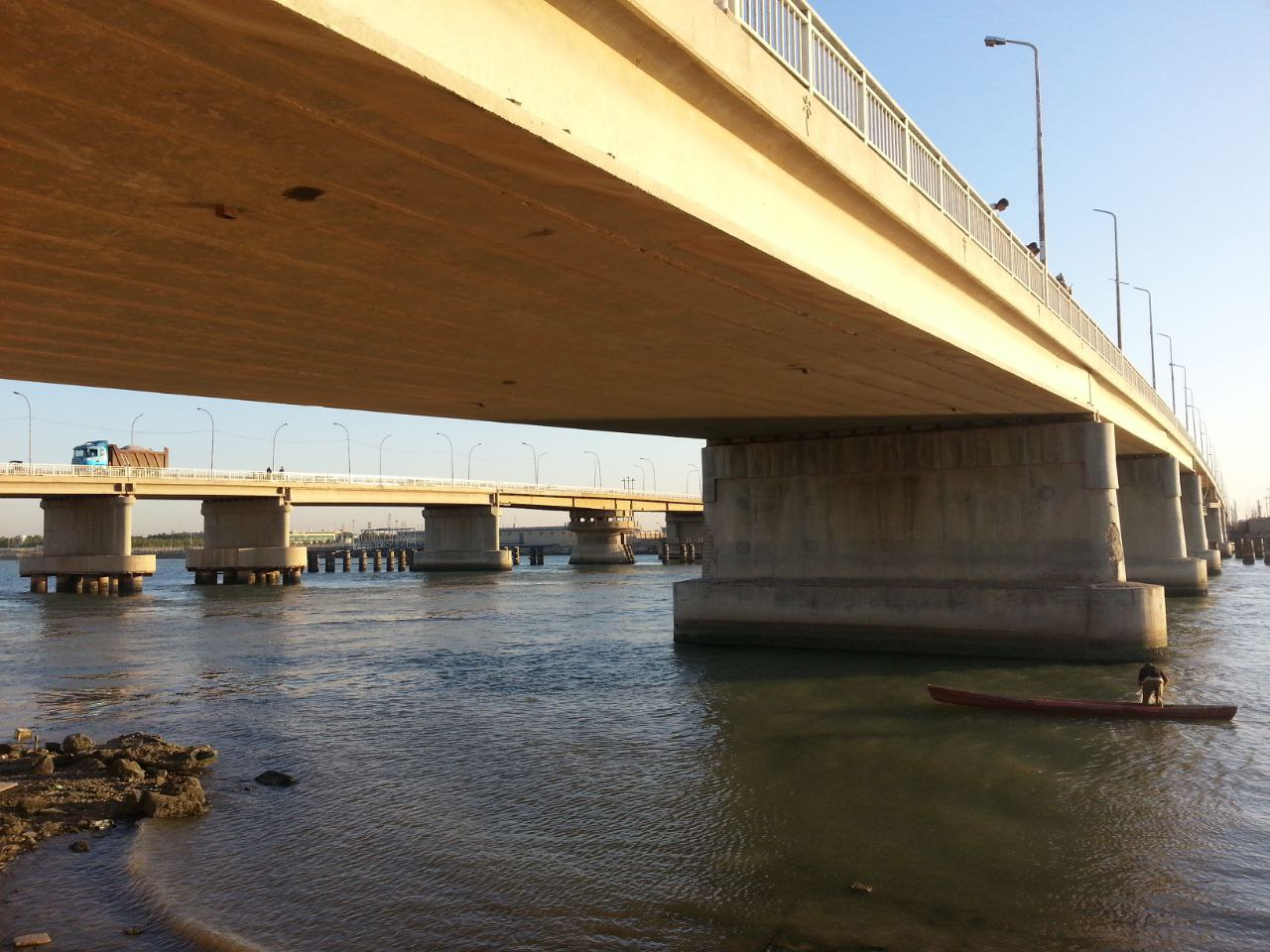
- Qarmat Ali bridge
- Interactive map of Qarmat Ali
- Coordinates: 30°34′28.9″N 47°44′48.1″E
- Country: Iraq
- Province: Basra
- District: Al-Hartha
- Established: 717 AD
- Founder: Adi ibn Artah al-Fazari

Area
  - Total: 250.34 km^{2} (96.66 sq mi)
- Elevation: 4 m (13 ft)

Population
  - Total: 80,350
  - Density: 321.0/km^{2} (831.3/sq mi)
- Time zone: UTC+3 (AST)
  - Summer (DST): (Not Observed)
- Area code: (+964) 40

Qarmat Ali (Arabic: گرمة علي ,i.e. Ali River), known locally as Al-Qarmah and historically as Nahr Adi, is an Iraqi town located in Al-Hartha District, Basra. The river that gives it its name runs through it, and it is the largest river in Basra. It is connected to the Marshes and flows into the Shatt al-Arab, and on it is a bridge connecting the north of Basra to its south, and another bridge connecting it to Al-Maqal. Some government institutions are located on its banks, including the University of Basra.

The town of Qarmat Ali is located 20 km (12 mi) north of the center of Basra.

== History ==
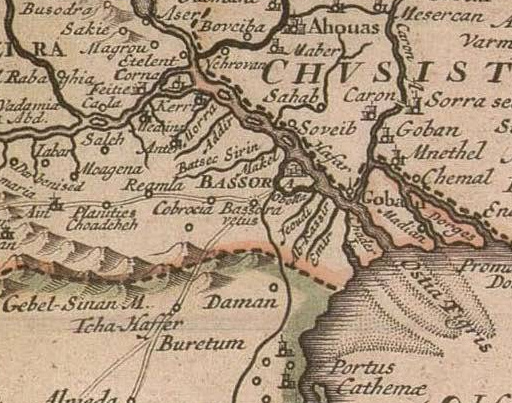
A map drawn in 1737 shows the Qarmat Ali River as Batsu Sirin, meaning the Bathq Shirin, which is the name of the place where the Adi River was dug, as mentioned in historical books.

In 717, Umar ibn Abd al-Aziz assumed power, and appointed Adi ibn Artah al-Fazari as governor of Basra. He found that its water was salty and the people were complaining about it, so he wrote to the Caliph asking for permission to dig a tributary river for them from the Basra River (Shatt al-Arab), and he ordered the people to write letters and insist on the Caliph, so the Caliph agreed to dig it and ordered that enough money be spent to dig it, so Adi dug it from the side called Bathq Shirin (Arabic: بثق شيرين), and it became a large river, and they held a celebration on the day of its conquest, in which the people gathered and Hasan al-Basri attended, and it was called Nahr Adi (Arabic: نهر عدي, "Adi River").

In 870, the Nahr Adi–Bathq Shirin became one of the rivers where battles took place in the Zanj Rebellion, and the two armies used it as a means of attacking the other army. Through it, the Zanj entered Basra, occupied it, and destroyed it.

In 1085, Al-Hariri built his palace on the banks of the river in the Bani Haram neighborhood. At that time, the Bani Haram Mosque was considered a scientific and literary center from which many writers and scholars graduated.

In 1836, the river and the land around it became the property of Ali Thamir Al-Saadoun, and the name of the river changed from Adi River to Ali River in the language of the people, and the name of the river changed to Qarmah (the popular pronunciation synonymous with the word river), so the name became Qarmat Ali. And the name of Bathq Shirin changed to Abu Hilwa (Arabic: أبو حلوة, i.e. Sweet); (Shirin means sweet in Persian, ). The name of Bani Haram neighborhood was changed to Harir neighborhood, in reference to the Al-Hariri Palace, which was still standing at that time.

In 1935, Suleiman Faydhi was elected governor of Basra, and the river caught his attention, so he built a wooden bridge over the Qarmat Ali River to connect its two banks.

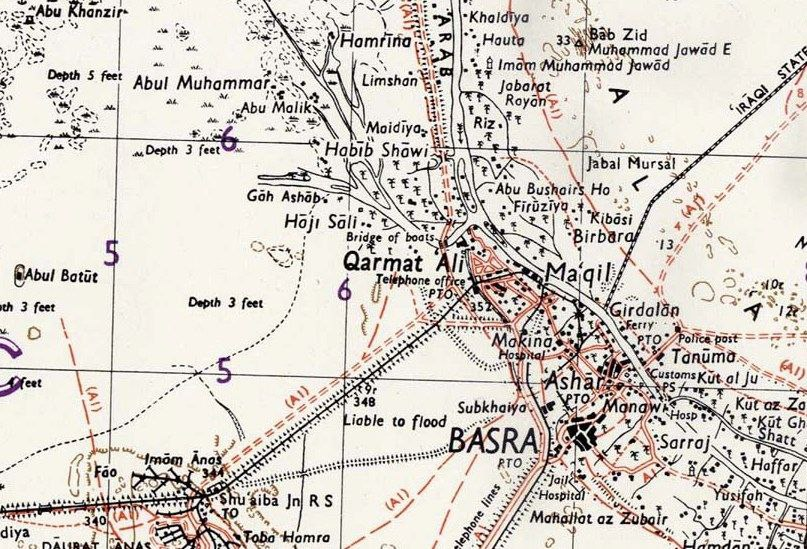
A map drawn in 1942 showing the name Qarmat Ali in big letters in the middle.

In 1941, under the influence of the Anglo-Iraqi War, a battle took place in Qarmat Ali between the Iraqi army led by Colonel Rashid Jawdat and the British army. It lasted for one day, after which the Iraqi army withdrew to Al-Qurna.

In 1965, the Qarmat Ali Iron Bridge was built under the direction of President Abdul Salam Arif, and its design was prepared by Bulgarian company.

In 1991, the area was bombed indiscriminately and heavily by order of President Saddam Hussein after the Battle of Basra.

== Geography ==
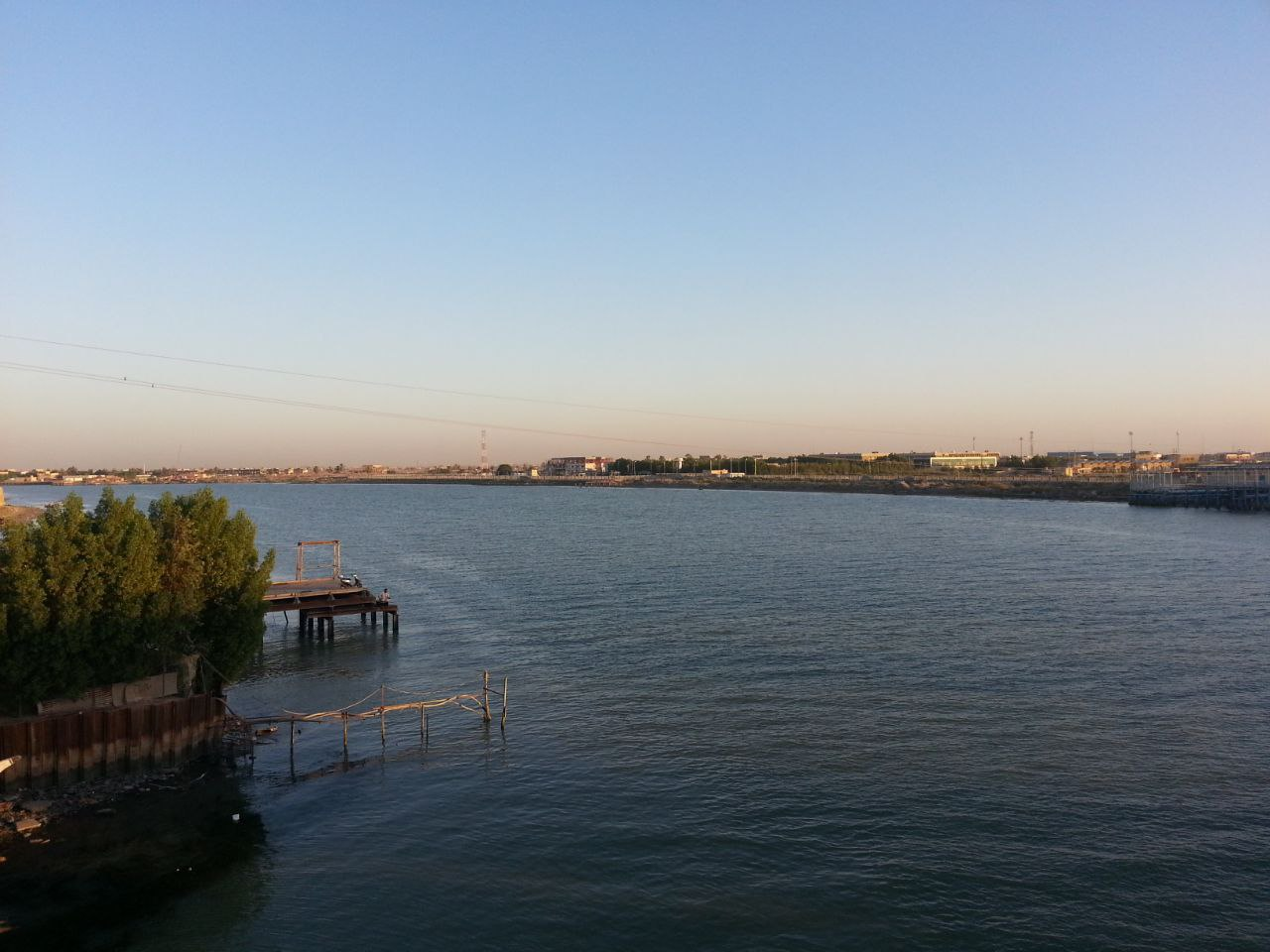
Qarmat Ali River

Qarmat Ali is located in the middle of Basra Governorate, to the east of the Marshes, and to the west of the Shatt al-Arab, and the Qarmat Ali River passes through it.

In its general formation, it represents a semi-islands that is close together and divided by water channels into small districts. The most important of these water channels are: Shatt al-Arab Al-Saghir (Al-Duwagh), Al-Assafiya, Al-Debin, Al-Shikhatta, Al-Salmi, Al-Dawai, Al-Misrah, Al-Jaberi, Zaibag, Khor Tradd, Abu Sukheir, Khor Tuwaihir, Al-Musandag, Al-Dhatcher, Al-Tuwaiyl, Al-Bahrani, Muzan, Al-Sagrawi, Al-Ghaima, Ajaj, Abed-Ali, Al-Baiaha, Al-Abbasi, Al-Husseiniya, Al-Areedh, Hamasa and Al-Jairi.

== Economy ==
The Qarmat Ali area is distinguished by being a unique location on the Shatt al-Arab, containing charming views. It is a very safe area with various basic facilities. It has a group of different restaurants and cafes. It also has many shops and various markets. It is located between two economically important areas, namely the Al-Zubair Oil Fields and the Nahr Omar Oil Fields, and a main road passes through it linking Basra to Maysan to the rest of the governorates of Iraq. Most of the townspeople have commercial stores and kiosks, and large number of residents work in government jobs and the rest in fishing.

== Notable people ==
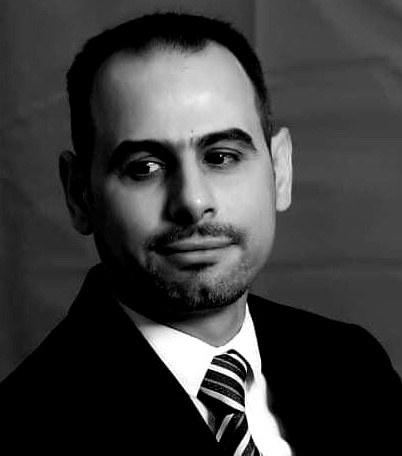
Muhannad Al-Shawi

- Al-Qasabani, scholar of Arabic grammar
- Al-Hariri, poet, writer and scholar of Arabic language
- Muhannad Al-Shawi, poet and writer
- Ehsan Hadi, football player
