= Ismaïl Ouro-Agoro =

Togolese footballer (born 1996)

Personal information
- Full name: Ismaïl Ouro-Agoro
- Date of birth: 20 February 1996 (age 30)
- Place of birth: Lomé, Togo
- Height: 1.82 m (6 ft 0 in)
- Position: Striker

Senior career*
Years	Team	Apps	(Gls)
–2019	Sara Sport FC		
2019–2021	ASKO Kara	3	(1)
2021–2023	Saint George	50	(37)
2023–2024	AS FAR	11	(4)
2024-2025	Naft Al-Basra SC	34	(11)

International career^{‡}
2019–	Togo	14	(0)
- * Club domestic league appearances and goals as of 27/07/25 @ 16:29(AEST) ‡ National team caps and goals as of 18 June 2023

Ismaïl Ouro-Agoro (born 20 February 1996) is a Togolese professional footballer who plays as a striker for the Togo national team. He most recently played for Naft Al-Basra SC in Iraq.
