= Ehsan Hadi =

Iraqi footballer and coach

Personal information
- Full name: Ehsan Hadi Saleh
- Date of birth: 1 May 1976 (age 50)
- Place of birth: Qarmat Ali, Basra, Iraq
- Height: 1.82 m (6 ft 0 in)
- Position: Striker

Youth career
- 1989–1994: Al-Bahri

Senior career*
Years	Team	Apps	(Gls)
1994–1997	Al-Bahri		
1997–1998	Kahrabaa Al-Hartha		
1998–2004	Al-Minaa		(20)
2004–2005	Duhok		(3)
2005–2012	Al-Minaa		(19)

Managerial career
- 2012–2013: Al-Minaa (assistant)
- 2018–2019: Al-Bahri (assistant)
- 2021: Al-Minaa (assistant)
- 2021: Al-Minaa
- 2021–2022: Naft Maysan (assistant)
- 2022–2023: Naft Al-Basra (assistant)
- 2024: Al-Bahri (assistant)
- 2024–2025: Al-Bahri
- * Club domestic league appearances and goals

Ehsan Hadi Saleh (Arabic: إِحْسَان هَادِي صَالِح; born 1 May 1976) is a coach and former professional Iraqi football player, he played as a striker.

== Club career ==
=== Early career ===
Hadi started playing in the Al-Bahri Academy in 1989. He progressed until he was promoted to the first-team in 1994. He stayed with his club for three seasons, then moved to play side Kahrabaa Al-Hartha for one season.

=== Al-Minaa ===
In 1998, Hadi moved to play in the Iraqi Premier League when Al-Minaa signed a contract with him, were the Al-Minaa's president, Hadi Ahmed, was impressed when he saw him play with his team, Kahrabaa Al-Hartha, in a friendly match against Al-Minaa. He remained play side Al-Minaa for six seasons. On 12 April 2002, he scored his first hat-trick against Al-Ramadi at Al-Ramadi Stadium, to help Al-Minaa win 5–1. On 10 October 2002, Hadi scored his second hat-trick when he led Al-Minaa to a 3–0 victory over Al-Samawa.

=== Duhok ===
In 2004, Hadi signed a one-season contract with Duhok. On 14 April 2005, he scored his third hat-trick in Premier League against Erbil, to help Duhok win 3–0 in the Northern Derby.

=== Return to Al-Minaa ===
In 2005, Hadi returned to play for Al-Minaa, and remained at the club until 2012, when he decided to retire. During that period, he scored 19 goals, including 4 goals in the Basra derby, making him the derby's top scorer. He also scored beautiful goals during that period, including his goal against Al-Quwa Al-Jawiya in December 2010, and his missile goal against Maysan in February 2010. On 23 December 2009, Hadi won the Thaghr al-Iraq Championship with his team after defeating Naft Al-Basra in the final, although he was sent off in the second half.

== Coaching career ==
In 2012, immediately after his retirement, Hadi started working as an assistant coach within the coaching staff of the Al-Minaa team led by Rahim Hameed.

On 16 April 2018, Al-Bahri signed a contract with Hadi as an assistant coach within the team's coaching staff led by Nasser Talla Dahilan. On 24 July 2018, Al-Bahri renewed its contract with Hadi within the coaching staff for a new season.

On 21 August 2021, Al-Minaa coach Qusay Munir chose Hadi as an assistant coach within the team's technical staff. On 23 October 2021, the Al-Minaa administration dismissed Qusay Munir from leading the team due to bad results, and Hadi chose as a temporary coach, to face Al-Quwa Al-Jawiya in his first experience as a main coach. The result of the match ended with a draw. On 7 November 2021, Al-Minaa contracted with Ammar Hussein as coach of the team, and Hadi kept in his assistant staff. Eight days later, Hussein resigned from the team's training, so the Al-Minaa administration chose Hadi as a temporary coach again. On 24 November 2021, the Al-Minaa administration contracted with Hatef Shamran as coach of the team, and thanked Hadi, who led the team during the last period.

On 20 December 2021, Naft Maysan signed a contract with Hadi as an assistant coach within the team's coaching staff led by Asaad Abdul Razzaq. On 7 March 2022, Naft Al-Basra signed a contract with Hadi as an assistant coach within the team's coaching staff led by Asaad Abdul Razzaq.

== Managerial statistics ==
As of 25 April 2025

Managerial record by team and tenure
Team	From	To	Record				
Team	From	To	P	W	D	L	Win %
Al-Mina'a	23 October 2021	24 November 2021	4	0	2	2	0.0
Al-Bahri	29 November 2024	25 April 2025	20	7	8	5	35.0
Total			24	7	10	7	29.2

== Honours ==
=== Player ===
Al-Minaa

- Thaghr al-Iraq Championship: 2009
