= Basra derby =

Football rivalry in Iraq

- Location: Basra
- Teams: Al-Minaa; Naft Al-Basra
- First meeting: Naft Al-Junoob 1–0 Al-Minaa; Iraqi Premier League (24 January 2005)
- Latest meeting: Naft Al-Basra 0–1 Al-Minaa; Iraq Stars League (22 April 2025)
- Next meeting: Naft Al-Basra v Al-Minaa; Iraq Stars League (TBD)

Statistics
- Total meetings: 36
- Most wins: Al-Minaa (14)
- Top scorer: Ehsan Hadi; Bassim Ali; Nasser Talla Dahilan; Alaa Aasi; Hossam Malik (4 goals each)
- All-time series (35 only): Al-Minaa: 14; Drawn: 13; Naft Al-Basra: 9
- Largest victory: Al-Minaa 4–1 Naft Al-Junoob; Iraqi Premier League (11 March 2005)

The Basra derby is the meeting of the association football clubs Al-Minaa and Naft Al-Basra (formerly Naft Al-Junoob until 2020), both of which are based in Basra, Southern Iraq. The two clubs have been rivals since the 2004–05 season when Naft Al-Basra club started playing in the Premier League. The clubs are respectively from Al-Maqal and Al-Tamimia, in the same city Basra, and for this reason a match between the two teams is sometimes called a "Basra derby". Another name is often used in the press is "South derby", which comes from the location of Basra province in southern Iraq. The animosity intensified since the first match, as Naft Al-Basra was not expected to win Al-Minaa 1–0, and the exaggerated protest by Al-Minaa supporters to referee of match Khalil Yousuf prompted him to retire arbitration forever. and this animosity reached a peak during the 2010–11 season, when both teams played at the end of the season in the Premier League in a match, that if it end at a draw, Naft Al-Basra will relegate to the Iraqi First Division League. Indeed, the match ended in a draw, and Al-Minaa fans celebrated the relegation of Naft Al-Basra, and considered it a winning of league title. In the 2014–15 season, Naft Al-Basra returned to avenge Al-Minaa, when both teams played at the end of the season in the Premier League. Al-Minaa needed two goals to go to the final, but Naft Al-Basra played a defensive squad until the end of the match, although they were losing 1–0.

The results of some of these match led to the dismissal of some coaches. In the 2007–08 season, the Naft Al-Basra management dismissed the coach Abdul Razzaq Ahmed after the match ended against Al-Minaa 3–3, and in the 2012–13 season, the Al-Minaa administration dismissed the coach Aqeel Hato after the match ended for Naft Al-Basra 4–3.

Since 2005, there have been 36 competitive Basra Derbies. Al-Minaa hold the precedence in these matches, with 14 victories to Naft Al-Basra's 9; there have been 13 draws. The most decisive result in an Al-Minaa–Naft Al-Basra game is Al-Minaa's 4–1 victory at Al Mina'a Stadium, their home ground, on March 11, 2005. There have been two incidences of 3–1, Al-Minaa have been won in both matches; home in December 2005, and away in January 2006.

== History ==
=== Origins ===
Al-Maqal (Al-Minaa) and Al-Timimia (Naft Al-Basra) are about 2.5 miles (4.0 km) apart, just north-east of Basra in southern Iraq

Al-Minaa began to play in the league soon after its inception in Iraq, starting in the 1975–76 season. It is one of the oldest clubs (established in 1931), and one of the most popular teams. Naft Al-Basra is a new club (established in 1979). It played its first top-flight league match in the 2004–05 season. The first match between the two clubs was dated as 24 January 2005, as Naft Al-Basra hosted Al-Minaa in Premier League. Naft Al-Basra beat Al-Minaa 1–0 in the inaugural match. The second match at Al-Minaa Stadium came on 11 March of the same year – Al-Minaa won 4–1. Four more matches were played over the next two seasons, all Al-Minaa victories. Then, two matches between the two clubs took place during the 2007–08 season; all ended with a draw. Naft Al-Basra took precedence over the following seasons, with plenty of draw results.

=== Thaghr Al Iraq Championship ===
Top Basra teams Al-Minaa and Naft Al-Basra met at the conclusion of the First Thaghr Al Iraq Championship organized by Basra Football Association from December 14, 2009 till December 21. Referees Ahmad Shaker, Lafta Hameed, Hazem Mohammed and Rashid Hussein lead the match. Al-Minaa advanced to the final after collecting 7 points by winning against Naft Maysan 3–1, Ghaz Al-Junoob 4–1. To that, Naft Al-Basra qualified after collecting the same number of points as it beat Al-Nassriya 3–0 and Al-Bahri 2–1. Al-Minaa won Thaghr Al Iraq Championship after winning over Naft Al-Basra at the final with a score of 2–1. Al Minaa’ goals were scored by Nayef Falah at the 46th minute and Hassan Hadi Ahmad at the 79th minute. On the other hand, the sole goal of Naft Al-Basra was scored by Muhannad Yousuf at the 10th minute of the game. The two teams shared the lead of the game that was led by referee Ahmad Shaker. The referee gave red cards to 3 players: Amjad Hameed, Alaa Nayrouz from Naft Al-Basra team and Al-Minaa player Ehsan Hadi.

== Statistics ==
Up to and including 1 April 2024, there have been 35 competitive first–class meetings between the two teams since the first meeting in 2005.

=== Head-to-head record by competition ===
Match result	Iraq Stars League	Iraq FA Cup	Thaghr Al Iraq Championship	Total
Al-Minaa win	13	0	1	14
draw	13	0	0	13
Naft Al-Basra win	9	0	0	9

=== Honours and achievements compared ===
Team	Number of top-flight seasons	Best top-flight finish	Iraq FA Cup	AFC Champions League
Al-Minaa	48	1st (Champion) (1977–78)	Semi-finalists (3) (1999–2000, 2002–03, 2016–17)	Group Stage (1) (2006)
Naft Al-Basra	22	5th (2013–14)	Semi-finalists (1) (2015–16)	—

== All-time results ==
Competitive matches only.

=== Al-Minaa at home ===
Al-Minaa result given first.

Date	Venue	Score	Competition
11 March 2005	Al-Minaa Stadium	4–1	Iraqi Premier League
2 December 2005	Al-Minaa Stadium	3–1	Iraqi Premier League
16 February 2007	Al-Minaa Stadium	2–1	Iraqi Premier League
10 December 2007	Al-Minaa Stadium	3–3	Iraqi Premier League
29 November 2008	Al-Minaa Stadium	0–0	Iraqi Premier League
21 December 2009	Al-Minaa Stadium	2–1	Thaghr Al Iraq Championship
9 May 2010	Al-Minaa Stadium	0–0	Iraqi Premier League
18 February 2011	Al-Minaa Stadium	0–0	Iraqi Premier League
24 July 2013	Basra Stadium	0–2	Iraqi Premier League
29 October 2013	Al-Zubair Stadium	0–0	Iraqi Premier League
4 July 2015	Basra Sports City	1–0	Iraqi Premier League
26 December 2016	Basra Sports City	0–1	Iraqi Premier League
24 January 2018	Basra Sports City	0–1	Iraqi Premier League
22 November 2018	Basra Sports City	1–0	Iraqi Premier League
17 February 2020	Al Fayhaa Stadium	1–0	Iraqi Premier League
15 March 2021	Basra Sports City	1–1	Iraqi Premier League
14 February 2022	Basra Sports City	0–1	Iraqi Premier League
22 December 2023	Al Fayhaa Stadium	1–1	Iraq Stars League
13 January 2025	Al Fayhaa Stadium	2–0	Iraq Stars League

Al-Minaa wins	Draws	Naft Al-Basra wins
8	7	4

=== Naft Al-Basra at home ===
Naft Al-Basra result given first.

Date	Venue	Score	Competition
24 January 2005	Al-Minaa Stadium	1–0	Iraqi Premier League
23 January 2006	Al-Minaa Stadium	1–3	Iraqi Premier League
7 May 2007	Al-Minaa Stadium	0–1	Iraqi Premier League
11 February 2008	Nasiriyah Stadium	0–0	Iraqi Premier League
20 March 2009	Nasiriyah Stadium	1–0	Iraqi Premier League
10 January 2010	Naft Al-Junoob Stadium	1–0	Iraqi Premier League
3 July 2011	Naft Al-Junoob Stadium	0–0	Iraqi Premier League
1 February 2013	Naft Al-Junoob Stadium	4–3	Iraqi Premier League
4 April 2014	Naft Al-Junoob Stadium	0–0	Iraqi Premier League
28 May 2015	Basra Sports City	1–1	Iraqi Premier League
6 July 2017	Basra Sports City	0–0	Iraqi Premier League
8 June 2018	Al-Zubair Stadium	1–1	Iraqi Premier League
15 May 2019	Basra Sports City	1–2	Iraqi Premier League
28 November 2020	Basra Sports City	1–2	Iraqi Premier League
26 September 2021	Al Fayhaa Stadium	3–1	Iraqi Premier League
1 April 2024	Al-Minaa Olympic Stadium	0–1	Iraq Stars League
22 April 2025	Al-Minaa Olympic Stadium	0–1	Iraq Stars League

Al-Minaa wins	Draws	Naft Al-Basra wins
6	6	5

=== Fixture top scorers in the derby (Premier League era) ===
Premier League saw 66 goals scored, 37 for Al-Minaa and 29 for Naft Al-Basra.
Players in bold represent those who are currently playing for Al-Minaa or Naft Al-Basra.

Rank	Player	Club(s)	Goals
1	(Iraq) Ehsan Hadi	Al-Minaa	4
1	(Iraq) Bassim Ali	Naft Al-Basra	4
1	(Iraq) Nasser Talla Dahilan	Al-Minaa, Naft Al-Basra	4
1	(Iraq) **Hossam Malik**	Al-Minaa, Naft Al-Basra	4
1	(Iraq) Alaa Aasi	Al-Minaa, Naft Al-Basra	4
6	(Iraq) Mohammed Shokan	Al-Minaa	3
7	(Iraq) Nawaf Falah	Al-Minaa	2
7	(Iraq) Ali Hosni	Al-Minaa	2
7	(Iraq) Ahmed Farhan	Naft Al-Basra	2

== See also ==
- Al-Mina'a SC
- Naft Al-Basra SC
