= Wesam Malik =

Iraqi footballer

Personal information
- Date of birth: 1 January 1989 (age 37)
- Place of birth: Iraq
- Position: Midfielder

Team information
- Current team: Naft Al-Basra
- Number: 40

Youth career
- –2007: Al-Minaa

Senior career*
Years	Team	Apps	(Gls)
2007–2014	Naft Al-Junoob		
2014–2015	Al-Quwa Al-Jawiya		
2015–	Naft Al-Basra		

International career^{‡}
2016–	Iraq	1	(0)
- * Club domestic league appearances and goals as of 24 July 2016 ‡ National team caps and goals as of 24 July 2016

Wesam Malik (born 1 January 1989) is an Iraqi footballer who plays as a midfielder for Naft Al-Basra in the Iraq Premier League, as well as the Iraq national team.

== International career ==
On 24 July 2016, Wesam made his first international cap with Iraq against Uzbekistan in a friendly match.
