= Muhannad Al-Shawi =

Iraqi poet (born 1974)

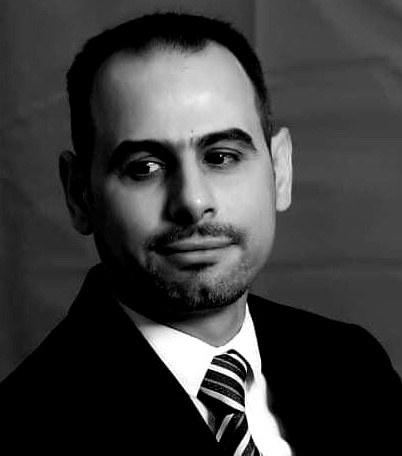
- Born: 3 August 1974 (age 52); Qarmat Ali, Basra, Iraq
- Education: University of Basra
- Occupations: Poet; writer
- Writing career
- Language: Arabic
- Genres: Poetry, essay
- Literary movement: Modernism

Muhannad Hassan Al-Shawi (Arabic:مهند حسن الشاوي; born 1974), is an Iraqi poet who belongs to the generation of contemporary poets who emerged after the 2003 war.

== Poetry ==
In his poetry, he combined originality of form with modernity of style and content. He was one of the poets of the new classical poem that achieved a presence in the Arab poetry scene in the modern era. He was born in Basra, studied in its schools, and graduated from the University of Basra in 1998. He won several literary awards, and several Iraqi satellite channels celebrated him to talk about his poetic experience, and some critics wrote about him, and some of his poems were translated into more than one language.

== Published works ==
- Nothing Follows Me But Me (Tammuz Press, 2011)
- This is Iraq, Without a Doubt (Aladab Albasri Press, 2020) ISBN 978-9-93352-061-8
