= Saadi Toma =

Iraqi-Assyrian footballer

Personal information
- Full name: Saadi Toma Jirjes
- Date of birth: 25 April 1955 (age 71)
- Place of birth: Baghdad, Iraq
- Position: Striker

Senior career*
Years	Team	Apps	(Gls)
1976–1986	Al Quwa Al Jawiya		

International career
1979–1986	Iraq	11	

Managerial career
- 1989–1990: Al-Quwa Al-Jawiya U-16
- 1990–1991: Assistant manager Al-Quwa Al-Jawiya
- Al-Karkh
- Al-Ramadi
- Al-Talaba
- Al-Akhaa Al-Ahli Aley
- Al-Taliya
- assistant manager Iraq
- 2005–2007: assistant manager Iraq U-23
- 2010–2011: Zakho FC
- * Club domestic league appearances and goals

Saadi Toma Jirjes (Syriac: ܣܥܕܝ ܬܐܘܡܐ) (born 25 April 1955) is an Iraqi former football player and coach.

He played during his professional career at Al-Quwa Al-Jawiya and made 10 appearances with the Iraqi national team. He Al-Quwa Al-Jawiya. He also trained a number of Iraqi and Arab football clubs. and was an assistant coach to both the national and the U-23 football Iraqi squads.

Saadi Toma made headlines by refusing to return to Iraq and applying for asylum in Australia after a match against the Australian U-23 national team.

He returned to Iraq and managed in 2010 as a manager of Zakho FC before resigning indefinitely for medical reasons.
