= Hossam Malik =

Iraqi footballer

Personal information
- Full name: Hossam Malik Menawer
- Date of birth: 1 January 1995 (age 31)
- Place of birth: Basra, Iraq
- Height: 1.78 m (5 ft 10 in)
- Positions: Winger; second striker

Team information
- Current team: Al-Naft

Youth career
- –2011: Al-Minaa

Senior career*
Years	Team	Apps	(Gls)
2011–2014	Naft Al-Basra		(18)
2014–2015	Al-Quwa Al-Jawiya		(0)
2015–2016	Naft Al-Basra		(5)
2016–2021	Al-Minaa	112	(21)
2021–2025	Naft Al-Basra		(10)
2025–2026	Masafi Al-Junoob		
2026	Newroz		(1)
2026–	Al-Naft		

International career^{‡}
2012	Iraq U17		
2013	Iraq U20		
2013	Iraq U23		
- * Club domestic league appearances and goals as of March 12, 2026 ‡ National team caps and goals as of September 23, 2015

Hossam Malik (Arabic: حسام مالك; born 1 January 1995 in Basra, is an Iraqi footballer who plays as a winger for Al-Naft in the Iraq Stars League.

== Club career ==
=== Early career ===
Malik started playing football at the Al-Minaa Academy, and was able to win with Al-Minaa U16 team the Basra Clubs Youth League in 2009.

=== Naft Al-Basra ===
In 2011, Malik moved to play for Iraq Stars League club Naft Al-Basra. On 6 May 2011, he scored his first goal in the Iraq Stars League against Al-Hindiya, in a match that ended in a 1–0 victory for Naft Al-Basra, which resulted in Al-Hindiya being relegated to the Iraqi First Division League.

=== Al-Quwa Al-Jawiya & Return to Naft Al-Basra ===
In 2014, Malik moved to Al-Quwa Al-Jawiya, but didn't play much with the team in the 2014–15 season. After eight rounds in the league in the 2015–16 season, he was released by the club's management.

On 1 December 2015, during the winter transfer period, Naft Al-Basra re-signed Malik on the recommendation of the new coach, Hassan Muwla.

=== Al-Minaa ===
On 8 June 2016, Malik signed with Al-Minaa. He scored 12 goals during the two first seasons and his contract was renewed for another season. In a season in which the club suffered from a financial crisis and administrative disputes, Malik scored 4 goals and renewed his contract for an additional year, unlike some players who refused to renew and moved to other clubs. In his fourth season at the club, he scored two goals in eight games, but the league was cancelled due to the COVID-19 pandemic. The following season, the player's contract was renewed, and he played until 9 June 2021, scoring 6 goals during that period, but he was released by the club's management for technical reasons.

=== Return to Naft Al-Basra again ===
In 2021–22 season, Malik returned to Naft Al-Basra again, and in his first match against his former team, Al-Minaa, he scored a goal in a match that ended with his team winning 3–1, becoming the top scorer in the Basra derby with four goals. In August 2022, his contract was renewed for an additional season. On 29 June 2025, the Naft Al-Basra administration decided to terminate player's services as a disciplinary punishment because of his abusive behavior against the coaching staff.

== International career ==
Malik was first picked to represent Iraq in 2012, when the under-17 coach Adel Nima selected him to be a part of his 23-man squad to play in Arab School Sports Games in Kuwait, in which they won the football gams and won gold medals. Malik scored the first winning goals in the final.

In April 2013 he was called up by under-20 coach Hakim Shaker as part of the 26-man squad for the 2013 FIFA U-20 World Cup. He was also selected by the coach Hadi Mtanesh to be part of the Olympic squad to play in the 2013 Islamic Solidarity Games in Indonesia.
