= Hassan Muwla =

Iraqi footballer and coach

Hassan Mawla
Personal information
- Full name: Hassan Mawla Almaliki
- Date of birth: 1 July 1963 (age 63)
- Place of birth: Basra, Iraq
- Height: 1.82 m (6 ft 0 in)
- Position: Striker

Youth career
- 1973–1978: Al-Ittihad

Senior career*
| Years | Team | Apps | (Gls) |
| 1978–1983 | Al-Ittihad | | |
| 1983–1991 | Al-Bahri | | |
| 1991–1994 | Al-Quwa Al-Jawiya | | |
| 1994–1995 | Al-Sinaa | | |
| 1995–1997 | Al-Minaa | | |
| 1997–1998 | Al-Bahri | | |

International career
| 1988 | Iraq | | |

Managerial career
- 1998–2000: Al-Bahri
- 2000: Al-Rumaila
- 2001–2002: Al-Zubair
- 2003: Al-Nasiriya
- 2004: Naft Al-Janoob
- 2005: Masafi Al-Janoob
- 2006–2010: Al-Bahri
- 2010–2012: Masafi Al-Janoob
- 2014: Al-Minaa
- 2015–2016: Naft Al-Janoob
- * Club domestic league appearances and goals

Hassan Mawla Maleh (Arabic: حسن مولى; born 1963 in Basra) is a coach and former international Iraqi football player, he played as a striker. He is currently working as a director of Basra Specialized Football School.

== Club career ==
=== Early career ===
Mawla began playing in the Al-Ittihad Academy in 1973. He progressed through the junior and youth teams until he was promoted to the first team in 1978. He played with his club for five seasons, including the 1980–81 season, in which he was able to help his team win the First Division League and get promoted to the Iraqi Premier League.

=== Al-Bahri ===
In 1983, Mawla moved to Al-Bahri, and played with the team for eight seasons, including the 1985–86 season, in which he helped his team for win the First Division League and get promoted to the Premier League. In the 1991 season, a decision was issued by the Iraqi Defense Ministry to dissolve the club, and its players moved to other teams.

=== Al-Quwa Al-Jawiya ===
In 1991, Mawla moved to Al-Quwa Al-Jawiya, where the team had high-level players, and he received support from fans and the media. He helped the team win the double of the league and the Cup in the 1991–92 season.

=== Al-Sinaa & Al-Minaa ===
In 1994, under the influence of coach Ammo Baba, Mawla moved to Al-Quwa Al-Jawiya, where the coach did not give him a chance to play, which prompted him to leave the club and move to play with Al-Sinaa. After one season, he moved to Al-Minaa to play one season with the team as well.

=== Return to Al-Bahri ===
In 1997, he returned to Al-Bahri team to play with them in the 1997–98 season, during which he helped the team qualify for the Premier League again, then he retired after the end of the season.

== International career ==
Mawla was first picked to represent Iraq in 1988, when selected him to be a part of Iraq squad to play in the 9th Arabian Gulf Cup.

== Coaching career ==
=== Juniors and Youth ===
In 1981, Mawla began his work as a coach at the Al-Ittihad Academy, where he trained the U17 and U19 teams. He participated with the two teams for two seasons in the Basra Clubs U17 League and the Basra Clubs U19 League.

=== First Division Clubs ===
In 1998, Mawla began coaching Al-Bahri and continued with the team until the 1999–2000 season, where his team came in runner-up in the league and was promoted to the Premier League. He then moved on to coach several clubs in the First Division League: Al-Rumaila (2000), Al-Zubair (2001–2002), Al-Nasiriya (2003), Naft Al-Janoob (2004), Masafi Al-Janoob (2005), Al-Bahri (2006–2010) and Masafi Al-Janoob (2010–2012).

=== Premier League Clubs ===
On May 11, 2014, Mawla was named Al-Minaa's manager in the Premier League after the team's previous manager resigned in the 19th round of the league. The team played four matches, then the Iraqi Football Association decided on June 18 to suspend the league for security reasons.

On November 14, 2015, Mawla was appointed coach of the Naft Al-Janoob team in the Premier League after the previous coach of the team, Emad Aoda, was dismissed in the 8th round of the league.

== Personal life ==
On 7 April 2020, Mawla was infected with the COVID-19, during the period of the COVID-19 pandemic in Iraq and the deaths of former football players due to the virus. In 21 April, it was announced that he had completely recovered from the epidemic, and he later stated that this period was the most difficult period he had gone through in his life.

== Managerial statistics ==
As of 15 March 2016

Managerial record by team and tenure
| Team | From | To | Record | | | | |
| Team | From | To | P | W | D | L | Win % |
|---|---|---|---|---|---|---|---|
| Al-Minaa | 11 May 2014 | 10 June 2014 | 4 | 1 | 2 | 1 | 25.0 |
| Naft Al-Janoob | 14 November 2015 | 15 March 2016 | 10 | 2 | 3 | 5 | 20.0 |
| Total | | | 14 | 3 | 5 | 6 | 21.4 |

== Honours ==
=== Player ===
Al-Ittihad

- Iraqi Premier Division League: 1980–81

Al-Bahri

- Iraqi Premier Division League: 1985–86

Al-Quwa Al-Jawiya

- Iraq Stars League: 1991–92
- Iraq FA Cup: 1991–92
