= Joseph Onoja =

Nigerian footballer

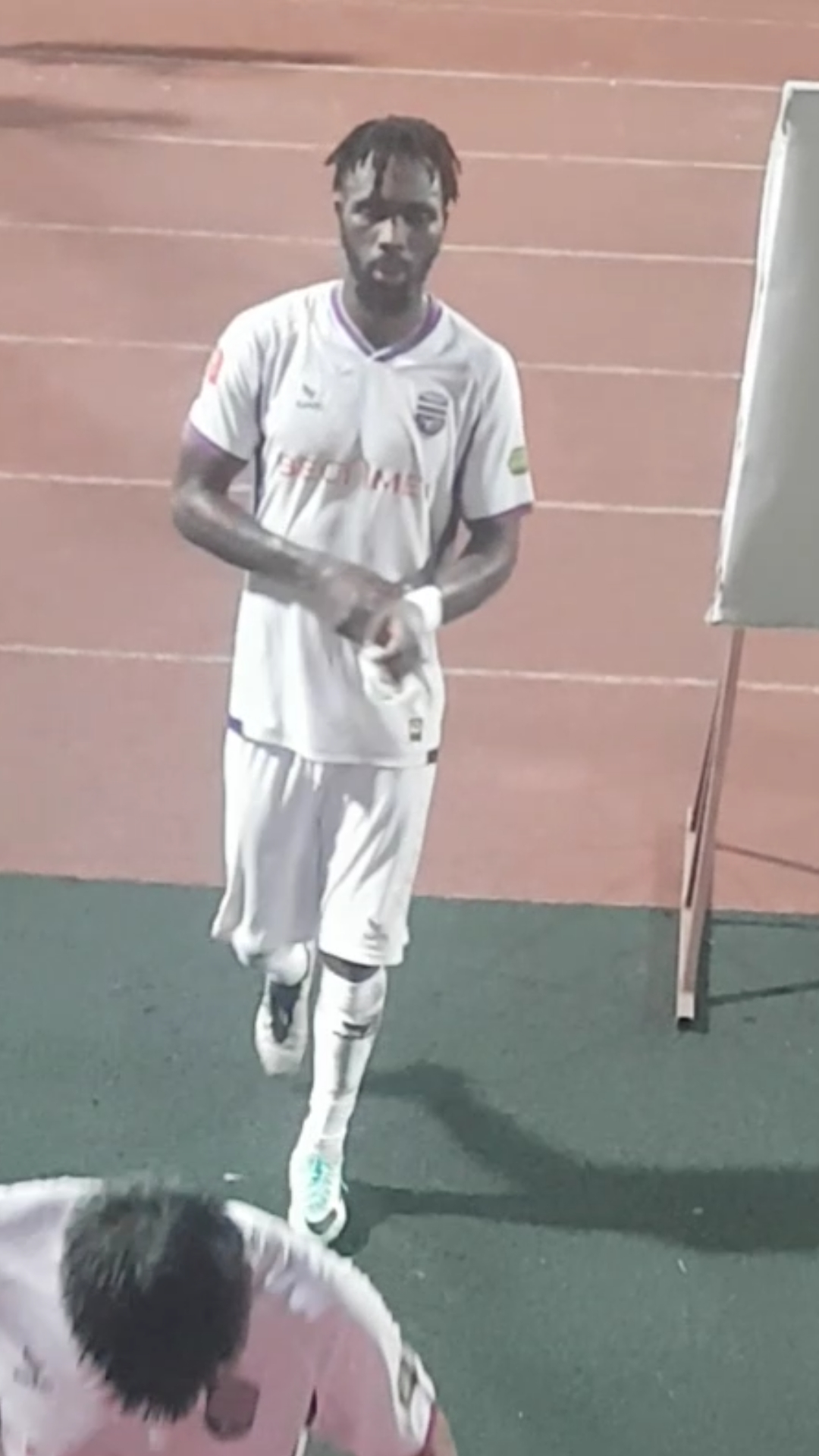
- Onoja in 2024

Personal information
- Full name: Joseph Onoja
- Date of birth: 6 November 1998 (age 27)
- Place of birth: Lagos, Nigeria
- Height: 1.83 m (6 ft 0 in)
- Position: Midfielder

Team information
- Current team: Song Lam Nghe An
- Number: 5

Senior career*
Years	Team	Apps	(Gls)
2017–2019	Gombe	25	(0)
2019–2020	Heartland	12	(0)
2020–2024	Rivers United	81	(6)
2024	Becamex Binh Duong	15	(0)
2024–2025	Naft Al-Basra	34	(0)
2025–2026	Hong Linh Ha Tinh	24	(0)
2026–	Song Lam Nghe An	1	(0)
- * Club domestic league appearances and goals as of 6 September 2026

Joseph Onoja (born 6 November 1998) is a Nigerian professional footballer who plays for V.League 1 club Song Lam Nghe An.

== Career ==
In 2019 season, Onoja joined Gombe United but left the same season for Heartland FC before moving to the Portharcourt-based side, Rivers United.

With Rivers United, Onoja won the 2021–22 Nigeria Professional Football League title. Onoja has represented Rivers United in the CAF Champions League. Onoja put in a good shift in the first leg of their CAF Champions League second preliminary round against Wydad Casablanca. His side come from behind to beat the Moroccans 2–1 in that game.

His performances for his club earned him a national team call up to represent Nigeria B in the 2022 African Nations Championship qualification. He made his debut for Nigeria on the 28 August 2022 against Ghana in Cape Coast.

On 27 February 2023, Onoja joined V.League 1 side Becamex Binh Duong.

On 14 August 2025, Hong Linh Ha Tinh announced the signature of Onoja to the team.

In July 2026, Onoja joined league fellow Song Lam Nghe An.

== Playing style ==
Apart from being a central midfielder, Onoja is versatile and can play multiple position. He has been seen to play in the defensive midfield, left side of the midfield and attacking midfield position.

== Honours ==
Rivers United

- Nigeria Professional League: 2021–2022
