= Rostand M'baï =

Cameroonian footballer

Personal information
- Full name: Rostand Junior M'baï
- Date of birth: 1 July 1995 (age 31)
- Place of birth: Yaoundé, Cameroon
- Height: 1.81 m (5 ft 11 in)
- Position: Forward

Team information
- Current team: Al-Ta'awon
- Number: 20

Senior career*
Years	Team	Apps	(Gls)
2012–2013	Union Douala		
2013–2014	Étoile du Sahel		
2014–2018	Coton Sport		
2018	Dragon Yaoundé		
2018–2019	IR Tanger		
2020–2021	Al-Minaa		
2021–2022	Mesaimeer		
2022–2023	Colombe Sportive		
2023–	Al-Ta'awon		

International career
	Cameroon U17	5	(1)
	Cameroon U20	10	(5)
	Cameroon U23	3	(0)
- * Club domestic league appearances and goals as of September 29, 2023

Rostand Junior M'baï (born 1 July 1995) is a Cameroonian professional footballer who plays as a forward for Libyan Premier League club Al-Ta'awon.

== Club career ==
M'baï started playing for Union Douala, then moved to Étoile du Sahel, then moved to Dragon Yaoundé and won league top scorer with them in 2018, scoring 20 goals. On August 1, 2018, he moved to IR Tanger and signed a four-year contract with the club.

On October 6, 2020, M'baï moved to play in the Iraqi Premier League, where he signed a contract with Al-Minaa. M'baï was able to score 7 goals with the team, as he scored his first goal on November 28, 2020, in the Basra derby, when he scored the winning goal against Naft Al-Basra in the last minutes of the match. On December 2, 2020, he returned to score the only winning goal against Naft Maysan. On January 2, 2021, he scored the goal to reduce the difference against Al-Shorta in a match that ended with Al-Minaa's defeat. On February 4, 2021, M'baï was able to score two goals against Al-Diwaniya, making him the professional player who scored the most goals in the league that season until round 17. On February 14, 2021, he was able to score an early goal against Naft Al-Wasat in a match that ended in a 1–1 draw. On April 18, 2021, M'baï scored the equalizer against Al-Zawraa in a match that ended in a 1–1 draw.

On August 1, 2021, M'baï moved to play in the Qatari Second Division, where he signed a contract with Mesaimeer. On November 3, 2021, he scored in the league against Al-Shahaniya, and on January 15, 2022, he scored in the Emir of Qatar Cup against Al-Markhiya.

On September 29, 2023, M'baï moved to the Libyan Premier League as signed a contract with Al-Ta'awon.

== Honours ==
Étoile du Sahel

- Tunisian Cup: 2013–14

=== Individual ===
- Elite One top scorer: 2018 (20 goals)
