= Ali Jawad Ismail =

Iraqi footballer

Ali Jawad
Personal information
- Full name: Ali Jawad Ismail
- Date of birth: 1 January 1985 (age 41)
- Place of birth: Basra, Iraq
- Position: Striker

Senior career*
Years	Team	Apps	(Gls)
2001–2002	Al-Minaa		
2002–2005	Al-Zawraa		
2005–2006	Al-Baqa'a		
2006–2007	Duhok		
2007–2008	Tishreen		
2008–2009	Duhok		
2009–2011	Naft Al-Janoob		
2011	Baghdad		
2011–2012	Naft Al-Janoob		

International career
2004	Iraq		
- * Club domestic league appearances and goals

Ali Jawad Ismail (Arabic: عَلِيّ جَوَاد إِسْمَاعِيل; born 1985) is an Iraqi former footballer who played as a forward for Iraq national football team.

== Honours ==
=== Club ===
==== Al-Zawraa ====
- Baghdad Championship: 2003–04
