= Haider Obeid =

Iraqi footballer

Personal information
- Full name: Haider Obeid Jassim
- Date of birth: 2 April 1979 (age 47)
- Place of birth: Baghdad, Iraq
- Position: Defender

Senior career*
Years	Team	Apps	(Gls)
2000–2001	Al-Zawraa		
2001–2003	Al-Karkh		
2003–2004	Al-Zawraa		
2004–2006	Riffa Club		
2006–2007	Apollon Limassol		(8)
2007–2008	Al-Wakrah		(1)
2008–2009	Zob Ahan	12	(0)
2010	Najaf		
2010–2016	Amanat Baghdad		

International career
2000–2007	Iraq	37	(3)

Managerial career
- 2017–2018: Zakho (Assist. coach)
- 2018: Zakho (Caretaker)
- 2019–2020: Al-Sinaat Al-Kahrabaiya (Assist. coach)
- 2020: Diyala FC
- 2021: Al-Sinaat Al-Kahrabaiya (Assist. coach)
- 2021: Al-Sinaat Al-Kahrabaiya (Caretaker)
- 2025: Al-Zawraa
- * Club domestic league appearances and goals

Haider Obeid (Arabic: حَيْدَر عُبَيْد جَاسِم; born 2 April 1979) is an Iraqi former football defender who last coached Al-Zawraa. He played for Apollon Limassol in the Cypriot First Division and Zob Ahan F.C. in the Iran Pro League.Manager Zakho FC

Obeid is the younger brother of Iraqi midfielder Abbas Obeid. He was first brought into the international team by Najih Humoud during the International Friendly Tournament in the Emirates in November 1999, where Iraq won the competition topping a group featuring hosts U.A.E, Estonia and Turkmenistan.

Obeid was part of the Iraqi U-19s that won the 1998 Rajiv Gandhi Cup in India and qualified for the 1998 Asian Youth Championship in Thailand. After his outstanding performances while on loan at Al-Zawraa for the Asian Cup Winners Cup in season 1999/2000, he was recalled by Adnan Hamad for the West-Asian Championship in Amman, Jordan.

== International career ==
=== International goals ===
Scores and results list Iraq's goal tally first.

No	Date	Venue	Opponent	Score	Result	Competition
1.	21 April 2001	Almaty Central Stadium, Almaty	Macau	4–0	5–0	2002 FIFA World Cup qualification
2.	23 April 2001	Almaty Central Stadium, Almaty	Nepal	1–0	4–2	2002 FIFA World Cup qualification

== Managerial statistics ==
As of 16 May 2021

Team	Nat	From	To	Record				
Team	Nat	From	To	G	W	D	L	Win %
Zakho (Caretaker)	(Iraq)	8 July 2018	18 July 2018	3	2	1	0	66.67
Diyala FC	(Iraq)	12 September 2020	25 January 2021	11	10	1	0	90.91
Al-Sinaat Al-Kahrabaiya (Caretaker)	(Iraq)	18 April 2021	16 May 2021	3	1	1	1	33.33
Total				22	18	3	1	81.82
