= Mohamed Ali Ragoubi =

Tunisian footballer

Personal information
- Date of birth: 18 June 1993 (age 33)
- Place of birth: Tunisia
- Height: 1.87 m (6 ft 2 in)
- Position: Attacking midfielder

Team information
- Current team: Olympique Béja
- Number: 5

Senior career*
Years	Team	Apps	(Gls)
2013–2016	JS Kairouan		
2017–2018	CS Sfaxien		
2017	→ Stade Gabèsien (loan)		
2018–2019	US Monastir		
2019	Stade Gabèsien		
2020–2021	JS Kairouan		
2021–2022	Al-Mina'a		
2022	Alittihad Misurata SC		
2023-	Olympique Béja		
- * Club domestic league appearances and goals

Mohamed Ali Ragoubi (born 18 June 1993) is a Tunisian football midfielder. He currently plays for Olympique Béja which competes in the Tunisian Ligue Professionnelle 1.
