= Ali Hadi =

Iraqi football player and manager (1967–2020)

Personal information
- Full name: Ali Hadi Mohsin
- Date of birth: 1 June 1967
- Place of birth: Baghdad, Iraq
- Date of death: 12 June 2020 (aged 53)
- Place of death: Baghdad, Iraq
- Position: Defender

Senior career*
Years	Team	Apps	(Gls)
1988–1994	Al-Zawraa		
1994–1996	Al-Talaba		
1996–1997	Al-Safa		
1997–1998	Al-Ahed		
- Al-Karkh

Managerial career
- Al-Samawa
- 2013–2014: Karbalaa
- 2014–2015: Zakho
- 2015–2016: Al-Kahrabaa
- 2016: Al-Quwa Al-Jawiya
- 2017–2018: Iraq U17
- 2019: Al-Talaba
- 2019–2020: Zakho
- * Club domestic league appearances and goals

Ali Hadi Mohsin (Arabic: عَلِيّ هَادِي مُحْسِن; 1 June 1967 – 12 June 2020) was an Iraqi professional football player and manager. He played as a defender for Al-Zawraa and Al-Talaba, winning several titles with the clubs; he also played in Lebanon, for Al-Safa and Al-Ahed.

Hadi also coached Al-Quwa Al-Jawiya in the 2016 AFC Cup, and led the Iraq national under-17 team to qualification for the 2018 AFC U-16 Championship.

== Club career ==
Hadi began his senior career in 1988 at Al-Zawraa, staying there for six years; he won four Iraqi Premier League titles. Hadi moved to Al-Talaba in 1994. In 1996 Hadi moved to Lebanon, playing for Al-Safa, before joining Al-Ahed the following season.

== Managerial career ==
Hadi was part of the technical staff of the Iraq national under-20 team, that finished in fourth place at the 2013 FIFA U-20 World Cup in Turkey. He also coached Al-Quwa Al-Jawiya in the 2016 AFC Cup, and led the Iraq national under-17 team to qualification for the 2018 AFC U-16 Championship.

== Death ==
On 7 June 2020, Hadi was admitted to the Baghdad Hospital, after contracting COVID-19 during the COVID-19 pandemic in Iraq. On 12 June 2020, Hadi was pronounced dead at 53 years of age.

== Managerial statistics ==
As of match played 23 October 2019

Managerial record by team and tenure
Team	From	To	Record					Ref.
Team	From	To	P	W	D	L	Win %	Ref.
Zakho	9 December 2014	4 May 2015	10	3	3	4	30.0	
Al-Kahrabaa	31 May 2015	1 February 2016	14	2	6	6	14.3	
Al-Quwa Al-Jawiya	3 April 2016	18 May 2016	8	5	0	3	62.5	
Iraq U17	6 March 2017	29 July 2018	3	2	1	0	66.7	
Al-Talaba	15 June 2019	23 July 2019	8	2	1	5	25.0	
Zakho	4 October 2019	23 October 2019	1	0	1	0	0.0	
Total			44	14	12	18	31.8	—
