= Al-Tadamon SC (Iraq) =

Iraqi football club

- Full name: Al-Tadamon Sport Club
- Founded: 1973; 53 years ago
- Ground: Al-Tadamun Stadium
- Chairman: Mohammed Al-Fatlawi
- League: Iraqi Third Division League
Home colours	Away colours

Al-Tadamon Sport Club (Arabic: نادي التضامن الرياضي), is an Iraqi football team based in Al-Najaf, that plays in the Iraqi Third Division League.

== See also ==
- 1988–89 Iraq FA Cup
- 1989–90 Iraq FA Cup
