= Al Hartha =

Coordinates: 30.7167°N 47.7167°E

Al Hartha is a city located in the north-eastern part of Basrah Governorate on the east bank of the river Euphrates, bounded on the north to Qurna and the south province of Basra, linking Hartha, the main road, with Baghdad and the city center, Basra. Basra International Airport and the University of Basrah Campus are located in the southern part of Al Hartha.

== Al-Hartha Thermal Power Plant ==
The Al-Hartha Thermal Power Station resides here. It is, in southern Iraq, the "largest electrical generator". During the first night of the Persian Gulf War, US missiles impacted the station, causing it to shut down. This cut off power to over 1.5 million people. The continued raids on power stations and frequent attacks on the Al-Hartha station would leave much of Iraq without power for a period of months.
