= Basra Specialized Football School =

Basra Specialized Football School (BSFS) was opened on the recommendation of Bassam Raouf, Director of the Department of Football Specialized Schools at the Federal Ministry of Youth and Sports in 2012.

== Location and Management ==
Basra Specialized Football School is located in the area Kut al-Hijjaj in the center of Basra, and headed by coach Hassan Muwla since its inception. The Football School team won the title of the Perfect Team by the Ministry of Youth and Sports at the 2018 tournament.
