= Al-Sinaat Al-Kahrabaiya SC =

Iraqi football club

- Full name: Al-Sinaat Al-Kahrabaiya Sport Club
- Founded: 2009; 17 years ago
- Ground: Al-Sinaa Stadium
- Owner: Ministry of Industry and Minerals
- Chairman: Ali Khalaf Jaber
- Manager: Qusay Hashim
- League: Iraqi First Division League
- 2024–25: Iraqi Premier Division League, 20th of 20 (relegated)
Home colours	Away colours

Al-Sinaat Al-Kahrabaiya Sport Club (Arabic: نادي الصناعات الكهربائية الرياضي, lit. 'Electrical Industries SC'), is an Iraqi football team based in Baghdad, that plays in the third tier Iraqi First Division League.

== History ==
Al-Sinaat Al-Kahrabaiya Sport Club was founded on 1 August 2009 by Ministry of Industry and Minerals, and was officially registered in the Ministry of Youth and Sports in 2011. Only six years later they qualified to play in the Iraqi Premier League after winning the 2016–17 Iraqi First Division League as a runner-up under the leadership of coach Kadhim Yousif. The club played in Iraqi Premier League in 2017–18 season for first time, in first season under coach Emad Aoda they were able to finish in 11th place, ahead of major teams that have been playing for many years in the league.

=== Board members ===
Position	Name
President	(Iraq) Ali Khalaf Jaber
Vice-president	(Iraq) Safaa Sahib
Secretary	(Iraq) Ahmed Saddam
Treasurer	(Iraq) Ali Mohsin
Member of the Board	(Iraq) Alaa Faisal
Member of the Board	(Iraq) Hadi Khalaf
Member of the Board	(Iraq) Adnan Manhal
Member of the Board	(Iraq) Haider Shwayea
Member of the Board	(Iraq) Saif Sami

== Managerial history ==
- (Iraq) Kadhim Yousif (2016–2017)
- (Iraq) Emad Aoda (2017–2018)
- (Iraq) Abbas Attiya (2018)
- (Iraq) Mudhafar Jabbar (2018–2019)
- (Iraq) Ahmad Abdul-Jabar (2019)
- (Iraq) Adel Nima (2019–2020)
- (Iraq) Emad Aoda (2020–2021)
- (Iraq) Abbas Obeid (2021)
- (Iraq) Haider Obeid (2021)
- (Iraq) Adel Nima (2021)
- (Iraq) Ali Abdul Jabbar (2021–2022)
- (Iraq) Haider Obeid (2022)
- (Iraq) Safaa Adnan (2022)
- (Iraq) Mudhafar Jabbar (2022–2023)
- (Iraq) Mohammed Ali Karim (2023)
- (Iraq) Qusay Hashim (2023–)
