= Alaa Abdul-Hussein =

Iraqi footballer (born 1986)

Personal information
- Full name: Alaa Abdul-Hussein
- Date of birth: October 7, 1986 (age 40)
- Place of birth: Basra, Iraq
- Position: Defender

Team information
- Current team: Arbil FC
- Number: 13

Senior career*
Years	Team	Apps	(Gls)
2004–2006	Al-Minaa		
2006–2007	Al-Talaba		
2007	Al-Ain (reserve)		
2007–2008	Pires FC		
2008–present	Arbil FC		

International career^{‡}
2006	Iraq	4	(0)
- * Club domestic league appearances and goals ‡ National team caps and goals as of 6 September 2006

Alaa Abdul-Hussein (Arabic: عَلَاء عَبْد الْحُسَيْن; born October 7, 1986) is an Iraqi football player who currently plays for Arbil FC in Iraq.
