= Marcelo Tavares (footballer) =

Brazilian footballer (born 1980)

Personal information
- Full name: Marcelo Vilas Boas Tavares
- Date of birth: August 30, 1980 (age 46)
- Place of birth: Santa Rosa de Viterbo, São Paulo, Brazil
- Height: 1.87 m (6 ft 2 in)
- Position: Center back

Senior career*
| Years | Team | Apps | (Gls) |
| 2000–2001 | Palmeiras | | |
| 2001–2002 | Portuguesa | | |
| 2002–2007 | Avaí | | |
| 2004–2007 | → Al-Hilal (loan) | | |
| 2007–2008 | Cruzeiro | | |
| 2007–2008 | → Al-Hilal (loan) | | |
| 2008–2010 | Al-Rayyan | | |
| 2010–2012 | Al-Shabab Riyadh | 22 | (1) |
| 2012–2012 | Lekhwiya | | |
| 2013 | Al-Sailiya | | |
- * Club domestic league appearances and goals

Marcelo Tavares (born August 30, 1980) is a Brazilian football (soccer) defender who is playing for Al-Sailiya in Qatar.
