= Rahim Bakr =

Iraqi footballer

Personal information
- Place of birth: Basra, Iraq
- Position: Midfielder

International career
Years	Team	Apps	(Gls)
1988-1989	Iraq		

Rahim Bakr (Arabic: رَحِيم بَكْر) is a former Iraqi football midfielder who played for Iraq between 1988 and 1989.

Bakr played for Al-Mina'a, Al-Ittihad and Al-Bahri, after retiring, he worked as a coach at the Basra Specialized Spherical School.
