= Zakho SC =

Iraqi football club

- Full name: Zakho Sport Club
- Nicknames: Sons Of Khabur (Note: Kurdish: کوڕێن خابیرێ, romanized: Kurên Xabîrê)
- Founded: 3 June 1987; 39 years ago
- Ground: Zakho International Stadium
- Capacity: 20,000
- Chairman: Ammar Farhad Agha
- League: Iraq Stars League
- 2025–26: Iraq Stars League, 9th of 20
- Website: https://zakhoclub.com/
Home colours	Away colours

Zakho Sport Club, (Arabic: نادي زاخو الرياضي) also spelled as Zaxo Sport Club (Kurdish: یانا زاخو یا وه‌رزشی, Yana Zaxo ya Werzişî), is an Iraqi professional sports club based in Zakho, Kurdistan Region, Iraq.

== History ==
Football in Zakho was played unofficially from the early 1920s with many local amateur games as well as school competitions regularly being held in Zakho or nearby districts. This eventually led to the formation of the first ever football team in Zakho in 1948. This was made up of local workers and young men.

=== Beginnings ===
In 1986 the management team of the Zakho Youth Sporting Center which consisted of president Yousef Dawad Jabo as well as members: Ali Omran, Bashar Rahmallah, Khaled Hussein, Neshan Kerob, Khalat Ramadan and Khwaste Furman came up with the idea of starting Zakho Football Club to replace the Sporting Center or to be a part of it. According to the National Olympic Committee of Iraq one of the requirements for the creation of the club was that there was to be actual participation of the Sporting Center in sports competitions for at least one year before the club could be registered. So the sporting committee set up teams for different age groups and started competing in different friendly matches.

=== Regional Championship ===
In 1986 Zakho competed in a regional tournament in Duhok under the name of Zakho Youth Center against Duhok Police, Duhok Youth Center, Duhok students and Duhok SC. Zakho went on to win the competition after defeating all the participants, including Duhok FC on penalties. In addition to the regional tournament that the Sporting Center achieved, they also found success in other sports such as basketball, wrestling, weightlifting and bodybuilding which improved their establishment bid significantly. Finally, on June 3, 1987 the club was officially registered.

=== Debut season ===
Since the club's inception in 1987 the club did not participate in any competition mandated by the Iraqi FA until 1990 for various reasons. Eventually they participated in the 1990/91 Third Division where they were in the Northern Group alongside At-Ta'mim club, Serwan club, Alkarma and Qurqosh. Each team would play home and away where the winner would go to the final of the 3rd league - the winner of this would be promoted to the Second Division. Zakho would top the group with 15 points but the 1991 uprisings in Iraq led to the cancellation of the remainder of the Iraqi football calendar. Zakho fans everywhere were upset.

=== 1991–92 season ===
The following season saw Zakho to return to sporting activities after head of the Olympic Committee Uday Hussein guaranteed not to interfere with any Northern Iraqi sportsmen. Zakho were once again in the Northern group after being drawn with Duhok SC, Qaraqosh, Al Karama and Tel Afar. Zakho topped the group after 5 wins and 3 draws and qualified to the final round.

In the final round Zakho were to play each of Samawa FC, The Neighborhood and Al Hillah. The format was each team to play each other in a single-legged tie. Zakho won the group with 7 points and were crowned Iraqi Third Division champions and qualified to the second division.

=== New stadium ===
On June 3, 2015 Zakho FC celebrated the opening of their new stadium, known as Zakho International Stadium with an unofficial friendly against the Iraqi national team. The match was notable as Shwan Jalal made his Iraq debut and kept a clean sheet in a 2-0 victory for Iraq. Despite this, the new stadium has been a success and the club's fans hope there will be bright times ahead for Zakho FC.

=== Iraqi Stars League ===
Zakho SC finished third in the Iraqi Stars League during the 2024–25 season, accumulating 71 points (20 W–11 D–7 L) from 38 matches with a +32 goal difference. The club recorded standout victories, including a 5–0 win over Karbala on 5 October 2024 and a 6–2 triumph against Al‑Qasim on 9 February 2025. On 26 April 2025, Zakho SC's official Instagram account confirmed that head coach Talal Al-Bloushi had resigned. Shortly after, Abdul-Ghani Shahad was appointed as the new head coach.

== Rivalries ==
The rivalry between Zakho SC and Duhok SC, known as the “Badinan Derby”, is one of the most intense in the Iraq Stars League. This rivalry is a key highlight of Iraqi football and attracts significant attention from fans, media, and local communities due to its intense competition and regional significance.

Also, the rivalry between Zakho SC and Erbil SC is known as the "Kurdish derby".

== Current squad ==
=== First-team squad ===
As of 20 September 2026

Zakho SC first-team squad
No.	Pos.	Player	Nationality	Notes
13	GK	Hassan Abbas	(Iraq)	
22	GK	Hoger Ali	(Iraq)	
28	GK	Imad Issa	(Iraq)	
2	DF	Mohammed Ghalib	(Iraq)	
3	LB	Orinho	(Brazil)	
4	DF	Shivan Jameel	(Iraq)	
5	DF	Akam Hashem	(Iraq)	
15	DF	Ibrahima Conté	(Guinea)	
17	RB	Mustafa Saadoon	(Iraq)	
24	DF	Ali Kareem	(Iraq)	
27	DF	Lucas Dias	(Brazil)	
32	RB	Muqtada Hassan	(Iraq)	
34	LB	Mustafa Maan	(Iraq)	
10	CM	Haron Ahmed Zubair	(Iraq)	
14	CM	Amjad Attwan	(Iraq)	Captain
19	CM	Hamid Haji	(Iraq)	
23	CM	Sipho Mbule	(South Africa)	
25	CM	Mohammed Ali Abbood	(Iraq)	
26	CM	Aliyu Adam	(Nigeria)	
11	AM	Moses Abbey	(Ghana)	
16	AM	Sidad Haji Nori	(Iraq)	
21	LW	Baker Amer	(Sweden)	
7	LW	Sherko Karim	(Iraq)	
77	LW	Ali Jasim	(Iraq)	
18	RW	Achref Habbassi	(Tunisia)	
9	CF	Sherzod Temirov	(Uzbekistan)	
99	CF	Ziad Ahmed	(Iraq)	

=== Technical staff ===
Position	Name	Nationality

== Managerial history ==
- (Iraq) Khodr Wakohdar (1986–1987)
- (Iraq) Amir Abdul Aziz (1987–1990)
- (Iraq) Pauls Quryaquos (1992–1993)
- (Iraq) Nori Zainal (1993–1994)
- (Iraq) Mohammed Ahmed Mulla (1995–1996)
- (Iraq) Sadeq Musa (1996–1997)
- (Iraq) Ali Hilal (1997–1998)
- (Iraq) Saleem Malakh (1998–1999)
- (Iraq) Mohammed Kadhim Mizyad (1999–2000)
- (Iraq) Hadi Mtanesh (2002–2004)
- (Iraq) Saleem Malakh (2004–2005)
- (Iraq) Adel Abdul Qader (2005–2006)
- (Iraq) Tariq Al Hejiya (2006–2007)
- (Iraq) Sabah Abdul Hassan (2007–2008)
- (Iraq) Adel Abdul Qader (2007)
- (Iraq) Talib Fadhel (2007)
- (Iraq) Manaf Shekho (2007)
- (Iraq) Adel Abdul Qader (2008)
- (Iraq) Ammori Ahmed (2009–2010)
- (Iraq) Walid Dhahad (2010)
- (Iraq) Nazar Ashraf (2010)
- (Iraq) Saadi Toma (2010–2011)
- (Iraq) Suleyman Ramadhan (2011)
- (Iraq) Basim Qasim (2011)
- (Iraq) Nadhim Shaker (2011–2012)
- (Syria) Mohammad Kwid (2012–2014)
- (Iraq) Ali Hadi (2014–2015)
- (Romania) Ilie Stan (2015)
- (Romania) Marin Ion (2016)
- (Iraq) Essam Hamad Salem (2016)
- (Romania) Marian Mihail (2016)
- (Iraq) Ahmed Wali (2016)
- (Romania) Dorinel Munteanu (2017)
- (Iraq) Hadi Ahmed (2017)
- (Iraq) Emad Aoda (2017)
- (Iraq) Mohammed Yousef (2017)
- (Iraq) Haidar Obeid Jassim (2017)
- (Iraq) Salih Radhi (2017–2018)
- (Iraq) Haidar Obeid Jassim (2018)
- (Iraq) Ahmad Kadhim Assad (2019)
- (Libya) Abdul-Hafeedh Arbeesh (2019)
- (Iraq) Ali Hadi (2019–2020)
- (Iraq) Ahmad Salah Alwan (2020–2021)
- (Iraq) Haitham Miteb (2021)
- (Iraq) Sami Bahat (2021)
- (Iraq) Abdul-Wahab Abu Al-Hail (2021–2022)
- (Syria) Firas Al-Khatib (2022)
- (Iraq) Hamza Hadi (2022)
- (Iraq) Haidar Abdul-Amir (2022–2023)
- (Qatar) Talal Al-Bloushi (2023–2025)
- (Iraq) Abdul-Ghani Shahad (2025–2025)
- (Qatar) Wisam Rizik (2025–2026)
- (Iraq) Ayoub Odisho (2026–2026)

== Honours ==
League

- Iraqi Premier Division League (second tier)
  - Runners-up (2): 2001–02, 2018–19
- Iraqi First Division League (third tier)
  - Winners (1): 1991–92

Cup

- Iraq FA Cup
  - Runners-up (1): 2024–25
- Kurdistan Cup
  - Winners (2): 2010–11, 2011–12
- Kurdistan Super Cup
  - Winners (2): 2010–11, 2011–12
