= Nawaf Falah =

Iraqi footballer

Personal information
- Full name: Nawaf Falah
- Date of birth: June 20, 1986 (age 40)
- Place of birth: Al-Zubair, Iraq
- Height: 1.87 m (6 ft 2 in)
- Positions: Second striker; midfielder

Team information
- Current team: Al-Bahri
- Number: 25

Youth career
- 2002–2003: Al-Zubair
- 2003–2004: Al-Bahri

Senior career*
Years	Team	Apps	(Gls)
2004–2006	Al-Minaa		(8)
2006–2007	Al-Wahda (reserve)		
2007	Al-Zawraa		(1)
2007–2008	Duhok FC		(7)
2008–2013	Naft Al-Janoob		(4)
2014–	Al-Bahri		

International career^{‡}
2005–2006	Iraq	5	(0)
- * Club domestic league appearances and goals as of 10 May 2017 ‡ National team caps and goals as of 9 August 2006

Nawaf Falah (Arabic: نواف فلاح) (born 20 June 1986 in Al-Zubair, Basra, Iraq) is an Iraqi football player who currently plays for Naft Al-Janoob in Iraq.
