= Emad Aoda =

Iraqi footballer and coach

Personal information
- Full name: Emad Aoda Mhoder
- Date of birth: 15 November 1981 (age 44)
- Place of birth: Basra, Iraq
- Position: Defender

Team information
- Current team: Naft Al-Basra SC (Manager)

Youth career
- 1994–1996: Al-Minaa

Senior career*
Years	Team	Apps	(Gls)
1996–2000	Al-Minaa		
2000–2003	Duhok		
2003–2004	Al-Zawraa		
2004–2007	Al-Minaa		
2007–2008	Al-Ramtha		
2008	Al-Minaa		
2008–2011	Naft Al-Janoob		

International career
2000–2001	Iraq U-20	10	(1)
2003–2004	Iraq U-23	5	(0)
2003–2005	Iraq	9	(0)

Managerial career
- 2012–2014: Naft Al-Janoob (Assist.)
- 2014–2015: Naft Al-Janoob
- 2017: Zakho
- 2017–2018: Al-Sinaat Al-Kahrabaiya
- 2018: Erbil
- 2019: Al-Minaa
- 2020–2021: Al-Sinaat Al-Kahrabaiya
- 2021–: Naft Al-Basra SC
- * Club domestic league appearances and goals

Emad Aoda (Arabic: عماد عودة) (born 15 November 1981 in Iraq) is a coach and former international Iraqi football player, he played as a defender. he is currently working as a coach for Al-Minaa club.

== International career ==
Emad Aoda was part of the Iraqi youth team from the start of the trail for the 2000 AFC Youth Championship playing in the qualifiers at the Rajshahi Stadium in Bangladesh, where he made one substitute appearance in the 6–0 win over the Maldives, Emad scored Iraq's 5th goal from 25- yards after nearly 25 minutes after coming on.

The defender started Iraq's first game in Tehran, Iran in the 0–0 draw with China and also replaced suspended Bassim Abbas in the 6–0 win over Pakistan, Emad made 2 substitute appearances against Korea Republic and in the semi-final win over Iran. The defender only started in the final against Japan taking the place of suspended regular Bassim Abdul-Hassan. After the final win in Tehran, he was called up into the Iraqi World Cup qualifiers squad, but he was one of many players omitted after Milan Zivadinovic was sacked and played a few matches under Bernd Stange.

== Coaching career ==
Aoda started managing in the Iraq leagues in March 2014. In January 2021, he was hired as manager of his sixth different club, Naft Al-Basra SC, following his second term as manager of Al-Sinaat Al-Kahrabaiya.

=== Managerial statistics ===
As of 27 December 2021

Team	Nat	From	To	Record				
Team	Nat	From	To	G	W	D	L	Win %
Naft Al-Janoob	(Iraq)	1 March 2014	14 November 2015	44	19	15	10	43.18
Zakho	(Iraq)	31 March 2017	14 October 2017	15	1	9	5	6.67
Al-Sinaat Al-Kahrabaiya	(Iraq)	21 October 2017	2 July 2018	35	11	10	14	31.43
Erbil	(Iraq)	25 August 2018	7 December 2018	13	5	4	4	38.46
Al-Minaa	(Iraq)	25 February 2019	24 May 2019	10	2	6	2	20.00
Al-Sinaat Al-Kahrabaiya	(Iraq)	23 July 2020	24 January 2021	19	4	8	7	21.05
Naft Al-Basra SC	(Iraq)	31 January 2021	""Present""	27	8	9	10	29.63
Total				178	55	68	55	30.90

== Honours ==
=== Club ===
Al-Minaa

- Iraqi Premier League: 2004–05 as a runner-up

=== International ===
==== Iraq U-19 ====
- AFC U-19 Championship: 2000
