= Naft Al-Basra SC =

Iraqi football club

Naft Al-Basra
- Full name: Naft Al-Basra Sports Club
- Nickname: Fursan Al-Junoob (Southern Knights)
- Founded: 27 November 1979; 46 years ago (as Naft Al-Junoob)
- Ground: Al-Fayhaa Stadium
- Capacity: 65,000
- Chairman: Ali Hanoon
- Manager: Andrej Panadić
- League: Iraqi Premier Division League
- 2025–26: Iraqi Premier Division League, 16th of 20
Home colours	Away colours

Naft Al-Basra SC (Arabic: نادي نفط البصرة الرياضي, lit. 'Basra Oil Sports Club') is a professional football club based in Al-Tamimia District, Basra, Iraq, that plays in Iraqi Premier Division League. The club was formerly known as Naft Al-Junoob (1979–1990; 2003–2020) and Al-Rumaila (1990–2003), and have been called Naft Al-Basra since 2020.

== History ==
=== Name changes ===
The club was founded on 27 November 1979 as "Naft Al-Junoob", before changing to the name "Al-Rumaila" on 6 March 1990, and returned to the name "Naft Al-Junoob" on 20 April 2003, the club played in Iraqi Premier League at the 2004–05 season for the first time.

On October 23, 2020, the club's management, which was elected a few days prior, decided to change the name of the club from "Naft Al-Junoob" to "Naft Al-Basra" and officially announced this, as they changed the logo.

== Rivalries ==
Naft Al-Basra contest the Basra Derby with Al-Mina'a. Since 2005, there have been 29 competitive Basra Derbies. Al-Mina'a hold the precedence in these matches, with 10 victories to Naft Al-Basra's 7; there have been 12 draws. The most decisive result in an Al-Mina'a–Naft Al-Basra game is Al-Mina'a's 4–1 victory at Al Mina'a Stadium, their home ground, on March 11, 2005. There have been two incidences of 3–1, Al-Minaa have been won in both matches; home in December 2005, and away in January 2006. The competition saw 54 goals scored, 30 for Al-Mina'a and 24 for Naft Al-Basra; the individual player who scored the most goals was Al-Mina'a player Ihsan Hadi and Naft Al-Basra player Bassim Ali, each scored four goals. And there are five players who scored for both teams, they are Alaa Aasi, Nasser Talla Dahilan, Ahmed Hassan, Sajjad Abdul Kadhim and Hussam Malik.

== Current squad ==
=== First-team squad ===
As of 20 September 2024

Note: Flags indicate national team as defined under FIFA eligibility rules; some limited exceptions apply. Players may hold more than one non-FIFA nationality.

No.	Pos.	Nation	Player
1	GK	IRQ	Abbas Ahmed
2	DF	TOG	Kangnivi Ama Tchoutchoui ^{FGN}
4	DF	IRQ	Jassim Faisal
8	MF	IRQ	Ahmed Saeed
9	MF	IRQ	Sajjad Saeed
10	MF	IRQ	Hossam Malik
12	GK	IRQ	Ahmed Shakir
14	MF	IRQ	Mustafa Hadi
15	DF	IRQ	Hussein Falah
15	MF	IRQ	Ahmed Fadhel
16	DF	IRQ	Kadhem Abdulkareem
18	DF	IRQ	Sabah Auad
18	DF	CIV	Hamed Touré ^{FGN}
19	MF	IRQ	Ali Al-Sajjad
22	GK	IRQ	Hussam Mahdi
23	MF	IRQ	Mohammed Rubat
24	DF	IRQ	Wael Abdulhussein
24	FW	NGA	Joseph Onoja ^{FGN}

No.	Pos.	Nation	Player
25	MF	IRQ	Sadeq Zamel
28	FW	TOG	Ismaïl Ouro-Agoro ^{FGN}
30	DF	IRQ	Karrar Jumaa
33	DF	IRQ	Mustafa Abduljalil
38	FW	CIV	Paved Job Atton ^{FGN}
52	DF	IRQ	Abbas Badeea
60	MF	IRQ	Murtadha Majid
61	DF	IRQ	Mohammed Saeed
88	FW	IRQ	Mohammed Salah
88	FW	IRQ	Ali Khalil
99	MF	IRQ	Hayder Ahmed
—	GK	IRQ	Mujtaba Mohammed
—	DF	BRA	Sergio Raphael ^{FGN}
—	DF	BRA	Romeu Martins ^{FGN}
—	DF	IRQ	Mustafa Moayed
—	MF	IRQ	Ahmed Jalal
—	FW	IRQ	Alaa Mohaisen
—	FW	IRQ	Mahmoud Ahmed

=== Out on loan ===
Note: Flags indicate national team as defined under FIFA eligibility rules; some limited exceptions apply. Players may hold more than one non-FIFA nationality.

No.	Pos.	Nation	Player

== Personnel ==
=== Current technical staff ===
Position	Name	Nationality
Manager:	Emad Aoda	(Iraq)
Assistant manager:	Salim Nayrouz	(Iraq)
Goalkeeping coach:	Akram Sabeeh	(Iraq)
Fitness coach:	Dhurgham Brazili	(Iraq)
Reserve Coach:	Ali Jassim	(Iraq)
U19 Manager:	Muntasser Hamdan	(Iraq)
U16 Manager:	Ahmed Hassan	(Iraq)
Administrative director:	Alaa Nayrouz	(Iraq)

Updated to match played 29 July 2019
Source: almirbad.com

=== Board members ===
Position	Name	Nationality
President:	Ali Hanoon	(Iraq)
Vice-president:	Hassan Abdul Hadi	(Iraq)
Secretary:	Aaliyah Makki	(Iraq)
Treasurer:	Asaad Karim Jassim	(Iraq)
Member of the Board:	Sajjad Kadhim	(Iraq)
Member of the Board:	Hisham Mohammed	(Iraq)
Member of the Board:	Mohammed Karim	(Iraq)
Member of the Board:	Maan Abdul Hassan	(Iraq)
Member of the Board:	Aqeel Najem	(Iraq)
Member of the Board:	Ali Abdul Karim Hashim	(Iraq)

Updated to match played 15 October 2020
Source: Alforatnews.com

== Managerial history ==
- (Iraq) Hassan Muwla (2004–2005)
- (Iraq) Abdul Karim Jassim (2005–2006)
- (Iraq) Abdul Razzaq Ahmed (2006–2007)
- (Iraq) Aqeel Hato (2007–2009)
- (Iraq) Asaad Abdul Razzaq (2009–2010)
- (Iraq) Abdul Karim Jassim (2010–2011)
- (Iraq) Hameed Salman (2011–2012)
- (Iraq) Adel Nasser (2012–2014)
- (Iraq) Emad Aoda (2014–2015)
- (Iraq) Hassan Muwla (2015–2016)
- (Iraq) Ali Wahab (2016–2017)
- (Iraq) Adel Nasser (2017–2019)
- (Iraq) Ammar Hussein (2019–2021)
- (Iraq) Salim Nayrouz (2021)
- (Iraq) Emad Aoda (2021–)

== Records ==
=== All-time top goalscorers ===
As of 16 July 2019

#	Nat.	Name	Career	Goals
1	Iraq	**Bassim Ali**	2008–2019	54
2	Iraq	Ali Jawad Ismail	2009–2012	34
3	Iraq	**Wesam Malik**	2008–2019	22
4	Iraq	Amer Sahib	2010–2015	16
5	Iraq	Hossam Malik	2010–2016	15
6	Iraq	Faisal Kadhim	2013–2019	13
6	Iraq	Nasser Talla Dahilan	2007–2010	13
6	Iraq	Nawaf Falah	2008–2015	13
9	Iraq	Murtaja Adel Nasser	2017–2019	10
10	Iraq	Ahmed Hassan Shanshool	2008–2011	9
10	Iraq	Ali Aoda	2013–2016	9

- Players in **bold** are still available for selection.

== Honours ==
- **Oil Minister's Cup**
  - Winners (1): 2010
- **Thaghr al-Iraq Championship**
  - Runners-up (1): 2009

== Other games ==
=== Handball ===
The Naft Al-Basra handball team won the Iraqi Handball League title at 2013–14 and 2014–15 seasons. The team also participated in Asian Club League Handball Championship and Arab Handball Championship of Champions as a representative of Iraq.
