= 1977–78 Al-Mina'a SC season =

Al-Mina'a SC
1977–78 season
- Chairman: Adnan Ali Al-Qassab
- Manager: Faleh Hassan Wasfi (until 16 October); Jamil Hanoon (from 16 October)
- Ground: Al Mina'a Stadium
- Iraqi National League: 1st
- Iraq FA Cup: Round of 16
- Top goalscorer: League: Jalil Hanoon (11 goals); All: Jalil Hanoon (> 11 goals)
Home colours	Away colours

The 1977–78 season was Al-Minaa's 4th season in the Iraqi National League, having featured in all editions of the competition. Al-Minaa participated in the Iraqi National League and the Iraq FA Cup, winning the league for the first time in their history, after finishing two points ahead of second-place Al-Zawraa. The season saw the dismissal of first-team coach Faleh Hassan Wasfi after scoring a draw in the first two games of the season and being eliminated from the Iraqi FA Cup in the round of 16 before that, and then the appointment of coach Jamil Hanoon. Striker Jalil Hanoon scored 11 goals to end the league season as the league's top goal-scorer total.

== Squad ==
Note: Flags indicate national team as defined under FIFA eligibility rules; some limited exceptions apply. Players may hold more than one non-FIFA nationality.

No.	Pos.	Nation	Player
—	GK	IRQ	Sattar Farhan
—	GK	IRQ	Samir Noori Al-Mtori
—	DF	IRQ	Aziz Abdullah
—	DF	IRQ	Sabeeh Abed Ali
—	DF	IRQ	Abdul Ridha Hussein
—	DF	IRQ	Rahim Karim
—	DF	IRQ	Khalil Ibrahim Habib
—	MF	IRQ	Hadi Ahmed

No.	Pos.	Nation	Player
—	MF	IRQ	Alaa Ahmad
—	MF	IRQ	Hassan Abdul-Hussein
—	MF	IRQ	Hadi Jabbar
—	MF	IRQ	Adnan Saddam
—	FW	IRQ	Abdul Razzak Ahmed (captain)
—	FW	IRQ	Raad Abdullah
—	FW	IRQ	Jalil Hanoon
—	FW	IRQ	Ali Abdul Zahra

== Pre-season ==
Win Draw Loss

Friendly	Erbil	0–6	Al-Minaa	Erbil

Friendly	Salahaddin	0–7	Al-Minaa	Erbil

Friendly	Al-Minaa	8–0	Salahaddin	Erbil

== Iraqi National League ==
=== Summary table ===
Overall								Home						Away					
Pld	W	D	L	GF	GA	GD	Pts	W	D	L	GF	GA	GD	W	D	L	GF	GA	GD
13	8	5	0	27	10	+17	29	5	2	0	13	4	+9	3	3	0	14	6	+8

Last updated: September 2017.
Source: niiiis.com

=== Matches ===
Win Draw Loss

1 October 1977 1	Al-Minaa	2 – 2	Salahaddin	Basra
	Ahmad; Ibrahim		Yilanda	Stadium: Al Mina'a Stadium

11 October 1977 2	Al-Sinaa	1 – 1	Al-Minaa	Baghdad
	Ahmed		Hanoon	Stadium: Al-Shaab Stadium

16 October 1977 3	Al-Minaa	1 – 0	Al-Ittihad	Basra
	Hanoon			Stadium: Al Mina'a Stadium

24 October 1977 4	Al-Zawraa	2 – 3	Al-Minaa	Baghdad
	Hassan (pen.); Yousif		Jabbar; Ibrahim; Hanoon	Stadium: Al-Shaab Stadium

31 October 1977 5	Al-Minaa	1 – 0	Al-Iktisad	Basra
	Ahmad			Stadium: Al Mina'a Stadium

11 November 1977 6	Al-Thawra	1 – 1	Al-Minaa	Baghdad
	Nouri (pen.)		Hanoon	Stadium: Al-Shaab Stadium

13 January 1978 7	Al-Minaa	1 – 1	Al-Jamea	Basra
	Saddam		Kadhim	Stadium: Al Mina'a Stadium

27 January 1978 8	Babil	0 – 6	Al-Minaa	Baghdad
			Hanoon; Ahmed; Abdul-Hussein	Stadium: Al-Shaab Stadium

6 February 1978 9	Al-Minaa	2 – 0	Al-Amana	Basra
	Hanoon (pen.); Ahmed			Stadium: Al Mina'a Stadium

17 February 1978 10	Al-Jaish	0 – 1	Al-Minaa	Baghdad
			Saddam	Stadium: Al-Shaab Stadium

27 February 1978 11	Al-Minaa	5 – 1	Al-Hilla	Basra
	Ahmed; Karim; Abdul-Hussein; Abdullah; Saddam		Abdullah	Stadium: Al Mina'a Stadium

21 March 1978 12	Al-Tayaran	2 – 2	Al-Minaa	Baghdad
	Malakh; Mashkour		Hanoon (pen.); Abdul-Hussein	Stadium: Al-Shaab Stadium

27 March 1978 13	Al-Minaa	1 – 0	Al-Shorta	Basra
	Hanoon 50' (pen.)		Hammoudi (penalty missed) 87'	Stadium: Al Mina'a Stadium

== Iraq FA Cup ==
Win Draw Loss

9 September 1977 Round of 32	Al-Minaa	? – ?	Al-Umal	Basra
				Stadium: Al Mina'a Stadium

16 September 1977 Round of 16	Al-Amana	3 – 0 (w/o)	Al-Minaa	Baghdad
				Stadium: Al-Shaab Stadium
Note: Al-Amana were awarded a 3–0 victory after Al-Minaa has violated the regulations of Iraq Football Association. While Al-Minaa won the game 2–0.

== Statistics ==
=== Overall statistics ===
	League	Cup	Total Stats
Games played	13	2	15
Games won	8	1	9
Games drawn	5	0	5
Games lost	0	(1)	(1)
Goals scored	27	5	32
Goals conceded	10	0	10
Goal difference	+17	+5	+22
Clean sheets	6	2	8

Last updated: September 2017

== Sources ==
- Iraqi League 1977/1978
- Iraq FA Cup 1977/1978
- Al-Minaa SC History
