= Alaa Ahmad =

Iraqi footballer

Personal information
- Full name: Aladdin Ahmad Khudhair
- Date of birth: 25 May 1952 (age 74)
- Place of birth: Basra, Hashemite Kingdom of Iraq
- Position: Midfielder

Senior career*
Years	Team	Apps	(Gls)
1971–1988	Al-Minaa		

International career
1972–1979	Iraq military		
1972–1973	Iraq U20		
1973–1975	Iraq U23		
1973–1980	Iraq	62	(1)
- * Club domestic league appearances and goals

Aladdin Ahmad Khudhair (Arabic: عَلَاء الدِّين أَحْمَد خُضَير; born May 25, 1952), simply known as Alaa Ahmad, is an Iraqi former footballer. He played as a midfielder and spent the majority of his career with Al-Minaa.

== Early years ==
Alaa started his career with Tarbiyat Al Basra team side in his birthplace of Basra, under the close supervision of international referee Sami Naji in 1952 and played football in school teams before he represented Al Basra team in 1971, at the age of 19, and then the Al Moshah team (one of the premier's league teams then). After two seasons he went back to his hometown where he started playing for Al-Inaa which he continued with until his retirement.

== International debut and Sport history ==
His international journey began in 1973 with Iraq national under-20 football team, which consisted of great players from the national team participating in the Palestine Cup of Nations which was held in Libya, and he played his debut match against United Arab Emirates where on which time the Iraqi team won 3–1. He was then invited to join the national team and he played his international debut match against Tunisia in Al-Shaab Stadium and the match concluded with a 0–0 draw. After his debut he played 54 other matches. Some of them were the 1974 Asian Games which were held in Tehran, Pestabola Merdeka in 1977 and 1978, 5th Arabian Gulf Cup in Baghdad in 1979 and Moscow Olympics in 1980.

Alaa was part of the 1977 World Men's Military Cup alongside the likes of captain Douglas Aziz and Ali Kadhim. The midfielder was one of the star players at Basra based club that included Rahim Karim, Jalil Hanoon and the Ahmed brothers Hadi and Abdul-Razzaq. After making his debut, he became a regular in the Iraqi national team alongside his Al-Minaa team-mate Hadi Ahmad, helping Iraq to win the 5th Arabian Gulf Cup in Baghdad and the 1979 World Men's Military Cup.

He was an important part of the Al-Minaa side that won its first Iraqi league title in 1977–78 season. In 1980, he represented Iraq in its first Olympic appearance in Moscow playing in all 4 games against Costa Rica, Finland and Yugoslavia and in the 2nd round, where they lost 4–0 to evidential finalists East Germany.

== The Coaches ==
Among his coaches were Sami Naji, Ammo Baba, Thamir Muhsin, Jamal Salih, the Yugoslavian coach Gaga, and the Scottish coach Danny McLennan.

== International goals ==
Scores and results list Iraq's goal tally first.

#	Date	Venue	Opponent	Score	Result	Competition
1.	17 July 1978	KLFA Stadium, Kuala Lumpur, Malaysia	Indonesia	1–0	4–0	1978 Pestabola Merdeka

== Honors ==
=== Local ===
Al-Mina'a

- 1978 Iraqi League: Champion

=== International ===
Iraq

- 1972 World Men's Military Cup: Champion
- 1977 World Men's Military Cup: Champion
- 1977 Pestabola Merdeka: runner-up
- 1978 Pestabola Merdeka: runner-up
- 1979 Arabian Gulf Cup: Champion
