= Nazar Abdul Zahra =

Iraqi footballer (1961–2006)

Personal information
- Full name: Nazar Abdul Zahra Khalaf
- Date of birth: 1 July 1961
- Place of birth: Al Ashar, Basra, Iraq
- Date of death: 15 May 2006 (aged 44)
- Place of death: Al Maqal, Basra, Iraq
- Position: Forward

Youth career
- 1974–1979: Al Waleed

Senior career*
Years	Team	Apps	(Gls)
1980–1993	Al-Mina'a		(41)

Managerial career
- 1994–2002: Al-Mina'a U-16
- * Club domestic league appearances and goals

Nazar Abdul Zahra Khalaf (Arabic: نِزَار عَبْد الزَّهْرَة خَلَف; 1 July 1961 – 15 May 2006), nicknamed "Maradona of Al-Minaa", was an Iraqi footballer who played forward. He spent the majority of his career with Al-Minaa club.

== Playing for Al-Mina'a ==
Nazar began playing in the People's Al-Ashar difference in the area, and after that he saw the coach Jamil Hanoon chosen to play at the club in 1980, has remained plays for his team even retired from playing in 1993.

== Coaching Exercise ==
NAzar after he retired, he began to exercise training as an assistant coach, accompanied coach Jalil Hanoon, where they were technical staff to Al-Mina'a U-16, and have achieved good results.

== Administrative work ==
With the change that took place after the invasion of Iraq and the overthrow of Saddam in 2003, a number of ancient players of Al-Minaa team met and decided to restore the team to its normal position to be among the top clubs in the Iraqi Premier League, Nazar was one of those, where he became the administrative supervisor of the team, and during that period the team won the runner-up in the league, and qualified to play in AFC Champions League.

== The Assassination ==
On Monday, 15 May 2006, Nazar was out of the Al Mina'a Stadium after the team's training, in 15:00 GMT, which is preparing to travel with your team to Kuwait, where taking place match Al-Mina'a against Al-Hilal within the 2006 AFC Champions League, and was assassinated by unidentified gunmen riding in a white Mazda car, within suspicious campaign to kill sportsmen in Iraq.

== Sporting events in honor of the late player ==
ِOn 15 May 2007 Al-Minaa Club commemorated the death of the player to establish a friendly match between the pioneer players of the club. and on 3 March 2013 the Martyr Al-Hakim Foundation for youth and sport and in collaboration with The youth and sport province of Basra established sports championship football on behalf of the players: Nazar Abdul Zahra and Ali Al-Diwan, the first match was among the pioneers of Al-Zawraa team led by Falah Hassan and pioneers of Al-Minaa team led by Jalil Hanoon, where 36 teams participated in this tournament.
