= Abdul Karim Jassim =

Iraqi football player and coach

Personal information
- Full name: Abdul Karim Jassim
- Date of birth: 15 May 1956 (age 70)
- Place of birth: Basra, Iraq
- Height: 1.80 m (5 ft 11 in)
- Position: Midfielder

Senior career*
Years	Team	Apps	(Gls)
1971–1972	Al-Ittihad		
1973–1974	Al-Minaa		
1974–1975	Al-Mowasalat		
1975–1977	Al-Minaa		
1977–1979	Al-Ittihad		
1979–1980	Al-Quwa Al-Jawiya		
1980–1981	Al-Ittihad		

Managerial career
- 1996: Al-Tijara
- 1997–1998: Al-Ramtha
- 1998–1999: Al-Ahli u19
- 1999–2002: Al-Tali'aa Taizz
- 2002–2005: Al-Hilal Al-Sahili
- 2005–2006: Al-Minaa
- 2007: Karbalaa
- 2008–2011: Naft Al-Janoob
- 2012: Al-Masafi
- 2012–?: Al-Oloom wal-Technologia
- * Club domestic league appearances and goals

Abdul Karim Jassim (Arabic: عبد الكريم جاسم بدر; born 15 May 1956), also known as Jombi, is an Iraqi football coach and former player.

== Personal life ==
He is son of former Iraqi international player Jassim Bader.

== Honours ==
=== Player ===
Al-Ittihad

- Iraqi First Division League: 1980–81

=== Manager ===
Al-Minaa

- Iraqi Premier League runner-up: 2004–05
- Peace and Friendship Cup: 2004–05

Al-Ramtha

- Jordan FA Cup runner-up: 1997

Al-Tali'aa Taizz

- Yemeni League runner-up: 1999–00
