= Mohammed Tariq Al-Katib =

- Born: Mohammed Tariq Wydad Al-Katib; 1926; Basra, Kingdom of Iraq
- Died: July 10, 2023 (aged 96–97); Amman, Jordan
- Education: University of London (PhD, 1953)
- Known for: Al-Jadriya Bridge, Rawa Bridge, Shatt al-Arab and Shatt al-Basra and History
- Title: Director of the General Company for Ports of Iraq
- Scientific career
- Fields: Civil engineering, Bridge engineering
- Workplaces: General Company for Ports of Iraq

Mohammed Tariq Al-Katib (1926–2023), also known as Tariq Wydad Al-Katib or simply Tariq Al-Katib, was an Iraqi engineer, administrator, author and writer. He is the designer of the double-decker Al-Jadriya Bridge in Baghdad.

== Early years ==
Mohammed Tariq was born in Basra in 1926. His father, Mohammed Wydad Al-Katib, was born in Aleppo during the Ottoman Empire, and graduated from Istanbul University with a specialization in medicine. He was the first surgeon doctor appointed in Basra hospitals in 1922.

Mohammed Tariq studied in Basra schools, then completed his high studies at the University of London, he graduated in 1953 with a PhD in Engineering.

== Engineering works ==
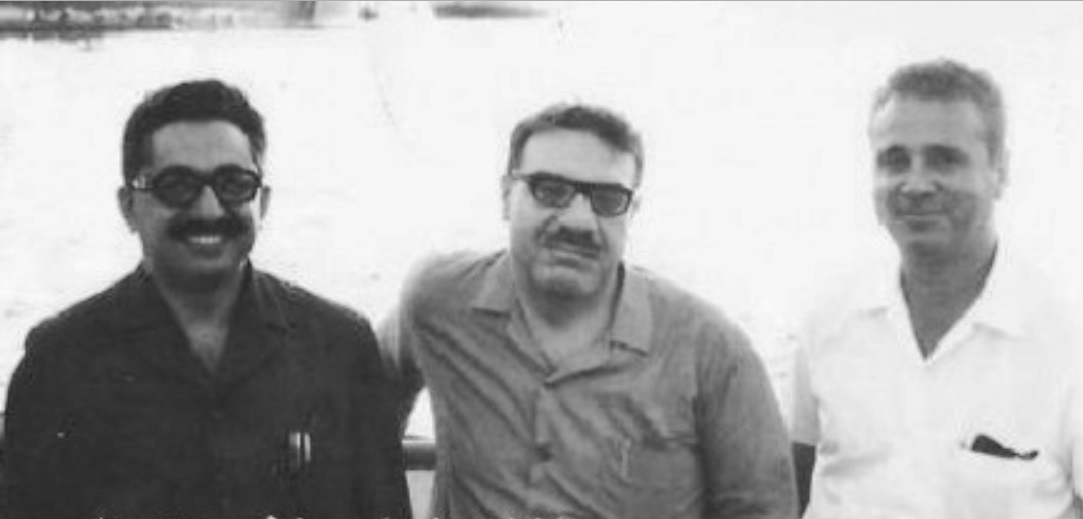
Tariq Al-Katib in the middle.

Mohammed Tariq is a consulting engineer and a skilled designer. He has left his mark in designing, implementing and rehabilitating many strategic projects in Iraq. Among his most famous designs were the double-decker Al-Jadriya Bridge in Baghdad in 1994, the reconstruction of the two damping towers at the Mosul Dam power station after they were destroyed during the American bombing of Iraq in 1991, and the reconstruction of the foundations of the Al-Hartha Power Station chimney using new pillars to strengthen them without removing them, which helped restore electricity to the southern governorates quickly. Among his other important works is his participation in designing the Rawa Bridge on the Euphrates River in 1989, and his participation in implementing the Latifiya Bridge, which was the first bridge to be built by purely Iraqi cadres in 1987.

== Director of GCPI ==
Mohammed Tariq moved to work in the General Company for Ports of Iraq. He rose through the ranks until he became the director of the General Company for Ports in the 1960s and 1970s. During his work there, he assumed the position of president of the Al-Minaa Sports Club in 1962–63 and 1966–69.

== Books ==
Muhammad Tariq is an author and researcher in various topics. He has two published books, the first is historical and the second is literary, which are:

- Shatt al-Arab and Shatt al-Basra and History.
- Scales of Arabic Poetry Using Binary Numbers.

== Death ==
On 10 July 2023, Muhammad Tariq died in the Jordanian capital, Amman, at the age of 97.
