= Nasser Talla Dahilan =

Iraqi footballer

Nasser Tallaa
Personal information
- Full name: Nasser Talla Dahilan Al Shammari
- Date of birth: 13 December 1978 (age 47)
- Place of birth: Basra, Iraq
- Position: Striker

Team information
- Current team: Al-Minaa (assistant coach)

Youth career
- –1999: Al-Zubair

Senior career*
Years	Team	Apps	(Gls)
1999–2002	Al-Minaa		(21)
2002–2003	Al-Jaish		
2003	Al-Zawraa		
2004–2006	Al-Minaa		(11)
2006–2007	Naft Al-Janoob		
2007	Erbil		
2007–2012	Naft Al-Janoob		
2012–2013	Al-Minaa		(9)
2013–2014	Naft Maysan		(1)

International career
2004	Iraq U23		
2004–2009	Iraq	8	(0)

Managerial career
- 2018: Al-Bahri
- 2020–2022: Masafi Al-Junoob
- 2023–: Al-Minaa (assistant)
- * Club domestic league appearances and goals

Nasser Talla Dahilan (Arabic: ناصر طلاّع دحيلان; born 1978) was an International Iraqi former football, who play with Iraq national football team in 2004 AFC Asian Cup qualification, he is currently working as assistant coach for Al-Minaa club.

== Managerial statistics ==
As of match played 27 December 2018

Managerial record by team and tenure
Team	From	To	Record				
Team	From	To	P	W	D	L	Win %
Al-Bahri SC	4 March 2018	27 December 2018	34	7	14	13	20.6
Total			34	7	14	13	20.6

== Honors ==
=== Club ===
Al-Minaa

- Iraqi Premier League runner-up: 2004–05
- Peace and Friendship Cup: 2004
