= Ali Abdul Zahra =

Iraqi footballer

Ali Abdul-Zahra
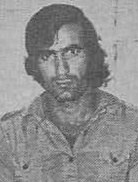
- Ali Abdul-Zahra in 1977

Personal information
- Full name: Ali Abdul-Zahra Dhaher
- Date of birth: 1 July 1953 (age 73)
- Place of birth: Basra, Iraq
- Position: Forward

Senior career*
Years	Team	Apps	(Gls)
1972–1985	Al-Minaa		

International career
1976–1977	Iraq	7	(1)
- * Club domestic league appearances and goals

Ali Abdul-Zahra Dhaher (Arabic: علي عبد الزهرة ظاهر; born 1953) is a coach and former international Iraqi football player, he played as a striker for Iraq national football team in 1977 Pestabola Merdeka.

== Clubs career ==
Abdul-Zahra played for Al-Minaa during the 1970s and 1980s and helped the team win the Iraqi league in 1977-78 season.

== International career ==
Ali Abdul-Zahra was considered a talented player, whom many classify as the most skillful player in Basra throughout history. He played for the Iraq national team and his brilliance was evident in the Pestabola Merdeka in 1977. Due to his excellence in that tournament, the fans nicknamed him Ali Merdeka. He scored a goal against Indonesia in that tournament.

== International goals ==
Iraq national football team goals
Scores and results list Iraq's goal tally first.

#	Date	Venue	Opponent	Score	Result	Competition
1.	17 July 1977	Kuala Lumpur Stadium, Kuala Lumpur, Malaysia	Indonesia	2–0	2–0	Pestabola Merdeka

== Honors ==
Al-Minaa

- Iraq Stars League: 1977–78

Iraq

- Pestabola Merdeka runner-up: 1977
