= Al-Minaa SC (basketball) =

Al-Mina'a
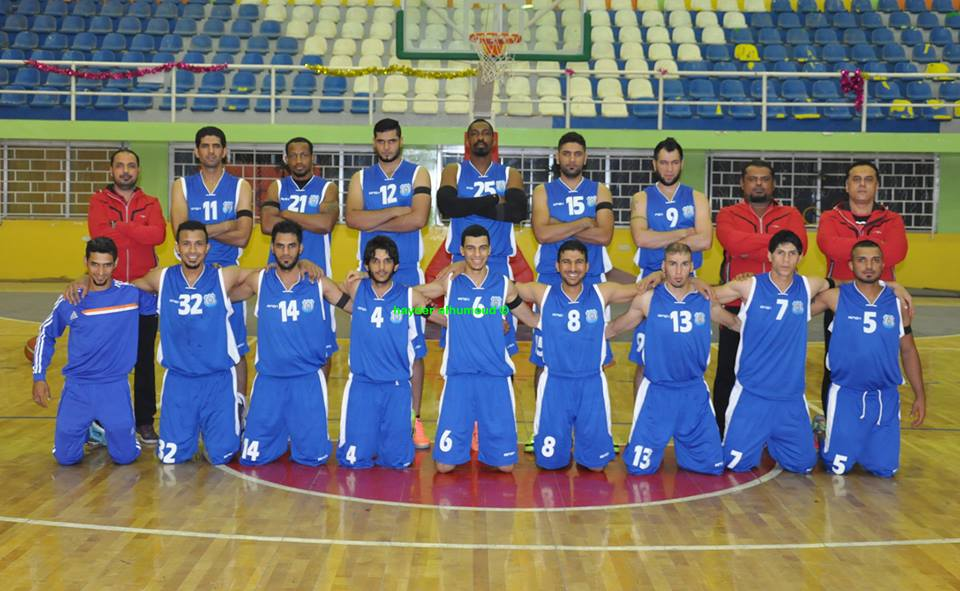
- Nickname: Al-Saffana (Sailors)
- Leagues: Iraqi Basketball League; Arab Championship
- Founded: 22 November 1931; 94 years ago
- Location: Al Maqal, Basra, Iraq
- Team colors: Blue and White
- Head coach: Asáad Allawi
- Website: Official website
Home	Away

Al-Mina'a is a basketball club, located in Al Maqal, Basra, Iraq that plays in the Iraq Basketball League.

== Notable players ==
- (United States) Travis Tyler.
- (United States) Cedric Ridle Jr.
- (The Bahamas) David Nesbitt.
- (United States) Rashad Bell

=== Current roster ===
Al-Mina'a BC roster
Players
Coaches

Pos.	No.	Nat.	Name	Ht.	Wt.	Age
PG	6	(Iraq)	Al-Juboori, Ali	1.67 m (5 ft 6 in)	87 kg (192 lb)	39 – 9 April 1987
F/C	11	(Iraq)	Mahdi, Mohammed	2.02 m (6 ft 8 in)	80 kg (176 lb)	45 – 19 September 1980
PG	13	(United States)	Stubbs, Jeffery	1.89 m (6 ft 2 in)	91 kg (201 lb)	35 – 3 March 1991
G	22	(Iraq)	Al-Elayawi, Khalid	2.06 m (6 ft 9 in)	96 kg (212 lb)	29 – 5 August 1996
G/F	15	(Iraq)	Al-Zubaidi, Imad	1.98 m (6 ft 6 in)	91 kg (201 lb)	46 – 17 February 1980
G/F	32	(Iraq)	Sewari, Ali	1.88 m (6 ft 2 in)	86 kg (190 lb)	41 – 1 May 1985
C	1	(Iraq)	Khudhair, Hayder	2.8 m (9 ft 2 in)	93 kg (205 lb)	42 – 26 April 1984
SF	8	(Iraq)	Al-Madhhachi, Fahad	1.85 m (6 ft 1 in)	99 kg (218 lb)	26 – 7 September 1999
G	5	(Iraq)	Alghaleb, Ali	1.87 m (6 ft 2 in)	89 kg (196 lb)	41 – 11 May 1985
C	10	(Iraq)	Al-Jebur, Mustafa	1.91 m (6 ft 3 in)	92 kg (203 lb)	39 – 3 August 1986

Head coach

- (Iraq) Asǎad Allawi

Legend

- (C) Team captain
- Injured

- Roster
Updated: August 25, 2020

== Honours ==
- Iraqi Basketball Premier League:
  - Runners up (1): 2015–16
- Iraqi Basketball Perseverance Cup:
  - Runners up (1): 2019

== See also ==
- Al-Mina'a SC
