= Rajab Al-Ni'ma =

Rajab Abdul-Razzaq Al-Ni'ma (1898–1967) was a former Iraqi politician and administrator. He was the first director of the Basra Municipality during the Mandatory Iraq.

== Early years ==
Rajab was born in Basra in 1898 during the Ottoman Empire. His father, Abdul-Razzaq Al-Ni'ma, was a politician close to the political leader Talib al-Naqib. He was nominated by the Freedom and Coalition Party in the parliamentary elections for the Chamber of Deputies in Istanbul and won membership in the Chamber of Deputies in 1914.

Rajab studied in Ottoman schools, then entered the Ottoman Islamic College in Beirut, then completed his high studies at the American University of Beirut.

== Administrative positions ==
=== Basra Municipality ===
Rajab returned to Basra after completing his studies. On 15 June 1920, he was appointed by the British military governor as director of the Basra Municipality, the first to hold this position during the Mandatory Iraq, and he resigned from his position after four years.

=== General Company for Ports ===
In 1929, Rajab moved to work in the General Company for Ports of Iraq, and held administrative positions there until 1958, when he was retired. During his work there, he assumed the position of President of the Al-Minaa Sports Club in 1946, as the first Iraqi to lead the Iraqi club after it was previously headed by the British.

== Family ==
Rajab has two sons, the eldest is Mustafa Al-Ni'ma, who is one of the famous doctors in Iraq in 1970s, and he was the founder of the College of Medicine in University of Basra and its dean from 1971 to 1975.
