= Al-Minaa SC =

Iraqi football club

Al-Mina'a
- Full name: Al-Mina'a Sports Club
- Nicknames: Al-Safana (The Sailors); Al-Areeq (The Deep-Rooted)
- Founded: 22 November 1931; 94 years ago
- Ground: Al-Minaa Olympic Stadium
- Capacity: 30,000
- Chairman: Asaad Al Eidani
- Manager: Miodrag Radulović
- League: Iraq Stars League
- 2025–26: Iraq Stars League, 15th of 20
Home colours	Away colours

Al-Mina'a Sports Club (Arabic: نادي الميناء الرياضي, lit. 'Port Sports Club') is an Iraqi multi-sport club based in Al-Maqal, Basra that participates in the Iraq Stars League, the top tier of Iraqi football. It is one of the most popular clubs in Iraq, particularly in the south, and became the first club outside Baghdad to win the Iraqi Premier League.

Al-Mina'a was founded on November 22, 1931, in Al-Maqal. In 1974, the club was merged with another team called Al-Bareed to form a single club called Al-Muwasalat, and it was a strange situation because the Al-Bareed team were based in Baghdad while Al-Mina'a were based in Basra and the two teams met in Baghdad on the day of the match only, so after just one season the club was dissolved and Al-Mina'a returned in their place. In 1978, the team won the national league title for the first time. After a lean period in the post-war years, the team finished second in the league in the 2004–05 season, and therefore qualified for the 2006 AFC Champions League, becoming the first Iraqi club from outside Baghdad to play in this tournament.

For a long time, the club was considered to be one of the Iraqi football clubs that had its own style of play, and the team practised only under the supervision and training of coaches who graduated from the club, until the beginning of 2011, when the club started to depend on foreign coaches.

== History ==
=== Foundation and early years (1931–1951) ===
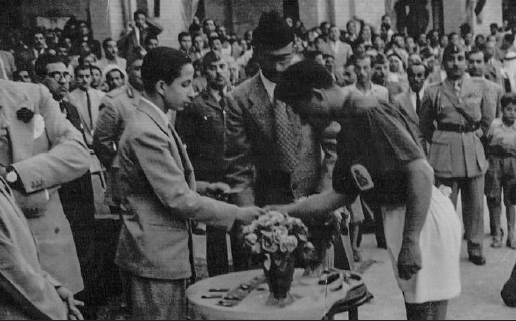
King Faisal II awards medals to Al-Minaa's players after Al-Minaa won the King Cup in 1948.

Al-Mina'a Sports Club was formed by some of the British sailors and workers serving in the Marine Transportation Company in Basra on the banks of the Shatt al-Arab after Mandatory Iraq, where Colonel Sir John Ward was the director of company in the 1920s. When they were forming gatherings, sports were practiced and football was the most important. After the founding of Al-Maqal City and establishment the General Company for Ports on March 1, 1931, by Colonel Sir Ward under the auspices of King Faisal, and the transfer of employees in the company to Al-Maqal, the club coordinated with the company's management to make the green squares in the park located there to be a playing field for them, and after a few months, the company announced the establishment of the club officially, and Mr. C. F. Neikell was chosen as the first president of the club. The first football team consisted of Markar Avadician, Kadhim Dawood, Dehjat Ohaness, Liu Steven, Samuel Akesh, Aziz Hormuz, Rashad Al-Mufti, Khudair Abbas and others. After the founding of the Iraq Football Association, Al-Mina'a participated in the Iraq FA Basra Premier League, a regional league for teams in Basra organised by the Basra branch of the IFA. Al-Mina'a won the league title in its first season, beating Sharikat Naft Al-Basra 1–0 in the final. Al-Mina'a also participated in the first ever national knockout cup in Iraq, the 1948–49 Iraq FA Cup, but were knocked out in the quarter-finals 2–0 by Baghdad-based side Al-Haras Al-Malaki. Al-Mina'a went on to finish in third place in the regional league in both the 1949–50 and 1950–51 seasons.

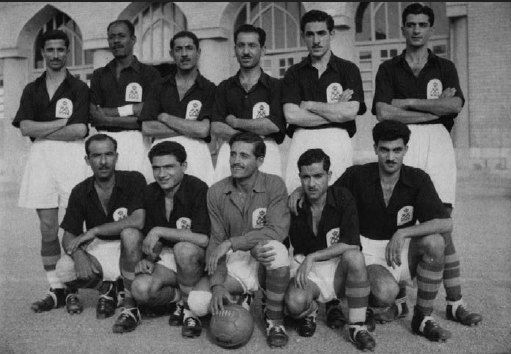
Al-Minaa squad at the Amjadiyeh Stadium in Tahran in 1950

In 1950, Al-Mina'a played its first match outside the country as the first Iraqi team to play outside Iraq, they played against Shahin at the Amjadiyeh Stadium in Tahran and the result was 2–2, The team was composed of these players: Mustafa Hameed, Karim Allawi, Noori Lafta, Jassim Bader, Karim Jaber, Jali Najeeb, Subhi Mohammed Zaki, Alwan Hussein, Michael Stanley, Salih Mohammed and Sabeeh Darwish. And the team played several friendly matches with other Iranian clubs. They played against Arteshe and the game ended in a 2–1 victory for Al-Mina'a, and they played against Taj Ahvaz and won that match 5–1. They also played against Khorramshahr and won 3–1, and they faced Abadan F.C. and won that game too. The team benefited greatly from those matches. In 1951, the team won the Hanna Al-Sheikh Cup, which was organized for Basra-based teams. And in the same year, the first Iraqi national football team was established. Coach Dhia Habib invited three players from the Al-Mina'a club to join them – Percy Lynsdale, Saeed Easho and Karim Allawi – to play against Turkey in Turkey. Before traveling, and on Wednesday May 2, 1951, Al-Mina'a played – with adding a player from Sharikat Naft Al-Basra club; Shaker Ismail – against Iraq in Basra, and ended the match a draw 1–1, Tariq Khalil scored for Al-Mina'a.

=== Matches with foreign teams (1952–1972) ===
The 1950s and 1960s were periods of preparation for Al-Mina'a, and the team played several friendly matches with different teams in this period; some of these clubs were strong European teams, and other were strong Asian teams. These matches helped the club develop the qualities of the players in terms of tactics and technique and other aspects.

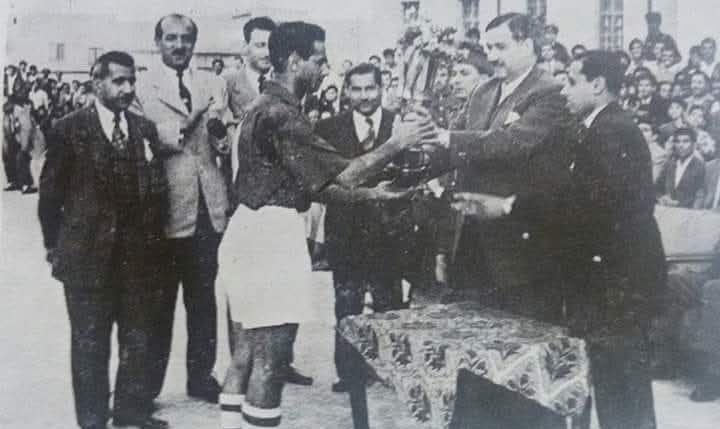
Al-Minaa captain Sabeeh Darwish receives the Basra Mutasarrif trophy after the team won the championship in 1956.

On January 6, 1956, Al-Mina'a played with Tehran F.C. and lost 3–0, and after a year they played with a number of English sailors teams, who were arriving in Basra in those years. On December 20, 1958, Al-Mina'a team travelled to Kuwait, playing against Kuwait national football team in a friendly match in Ahmadi, defeating Kuwait 8–0, scoring goals by Mohammed Manther, Karim Allawi, Nouri Lafta and Waleed Dawood, each with two goals, It was a very big result against a national team. In 1961, under the leadership of Danish coach Ingvard Hansen, the team played with a number of Iranian teams, beating Abadan F.C. 4–3 and losing to Shahin 1–0. and in February 1962, the Romanian club; Steaua București visited Iraq and Al-Mina'a, under the same coach, played with them and lost 4–1, then, Al-Mina'a played with the Syrian team Damascus and won 2–0. In February 1963, the team under the same coach, played with another Romanian club, Petrolul Ploiești, and lost 2–0 to them. The 1962–63 season saw Al-Mina'a win the Iraq FA Basra First Division, the top-tier league in the region, by winning three and drawing one of their four games. The club's B team were the league's runners-up.

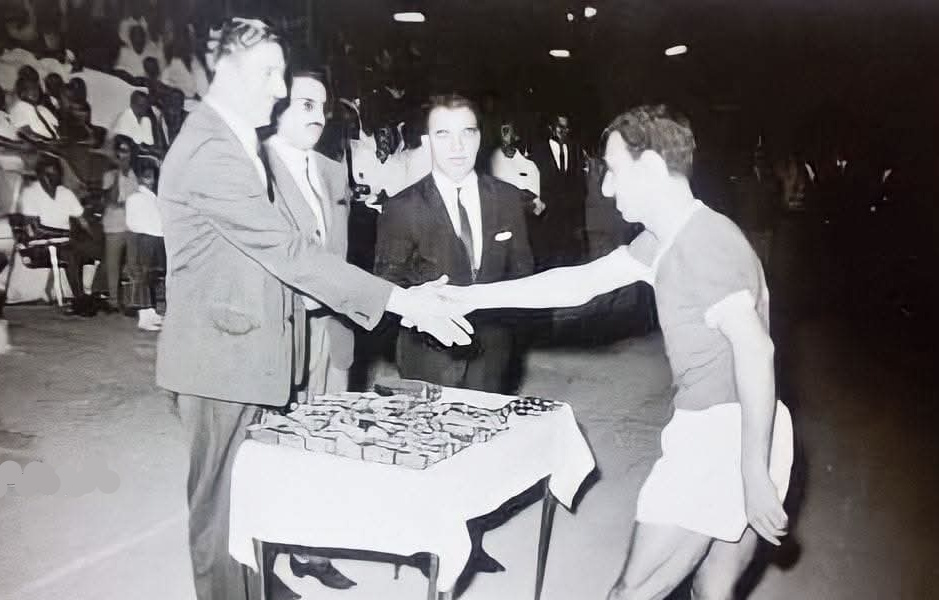
Al-Minaa captain Najem Abdullah receives medal after Al-Minaa beat Al-Bareed in the Annual Sports Festival final in 1969.

In November 1965, the team played the Kuwaiti club Al-Qadsia and the match ended in a 3–3 draw. In September 1968, the team traveled to Syria and played with some its teams, and the results were good, In 1969 the team under the leadership of coach Abdul Salam Saud, played against Bahraini club Al-Nusour and beat them 4–1; they then played against the Soviet club Neftçi and lost 1–0 On January 17, 1970, Al-Mina'a played against Yugoslavian club Sarajevo and lost 3–1, and over a year later on January 29, 1971, they played under the leadership of coach Hadi Hassan Wasfi, with Czechoslovak club Spartak Trnava and won 2–0; Waleed Dawood and Abdul Razzak Ahmed scored. On December 20, 1972, Al-Mina'a under the leadership of coach Hamza Qasim, played against the China national football team lost 1–0. These matches had a significant impact in making Al-Mina'a stronger team.

=== Golden years and League title (1973–1979) ===
By 1973, Al-Minaa had amassed 15 regional league titles in Basra. In the 1973–74 season, Al-Minaa played in Iraq's new nationwide league under the leadership of coach Hamza Qasim, and finished the season in third place. In the 1974–75 season, the first nationwide league of clubs was formed, and Al-Minaa were merged with another team called Al-Bareed to form a club called Al-Muwasalat which finished third place in the league.

Al-Minaa began to participate in the Iraqi Premier League as an independent club in the 1975–76 season under the leadership of coach Najem Abdullah, and finished the season in fourth place. The team was not well under coach Faleh Hassan Wasfi in the 1976–77 season, and finished in sixth place. The first match in Iraqi Premier League history to be televised was played in this season between Al-Minaa and Al-Zawraa at Al-Shaab Stadium on Friday, March 11, 1977, which ended 5–1 for Al-Zawraa.

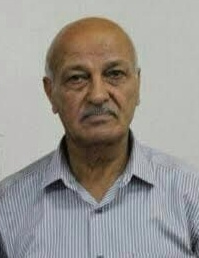
Manager Jamil Hanoon took over Al-Minaa in 1977 and has led them to win the first league title.

The 1977–78 season was the golden season for the team when they won the league title, and the title moved for the first time from the clubs of the capital, Baghdad, to Basra under coach Jamil Hanoon. The team collected 21 points by winning eight matches and drawing in five matches; they did not lose any matches in this season. The Al-Minaa player Jalil Hanoon won the top scorer award with 11 goals in the league. The champions' squad included the following players: Sattar Farhan, Sameer Nori, Aziz Abdullah, Sabeeh Abed Ali, Abdul Redha Hussein, Rahim Karim, Khalil Ibrahim, Hadi Ahmed, Alaa Ahmed, Ali Abdul Zahra, Abdul Razzaq Ahmed, Jalil Hanoon, Hassan Abdul Hussein, Adnan Saddam, Raad Abdullah and Hadi Jabbar. Before the league start, Al-Minaa played in a pre-season football friendly tournament in Arbil, and the team played against Arbil and won 0–6, and won against Salahaddin in two matches 7–0 and 8–0, depending on this, the team was well prepared for the league championship.

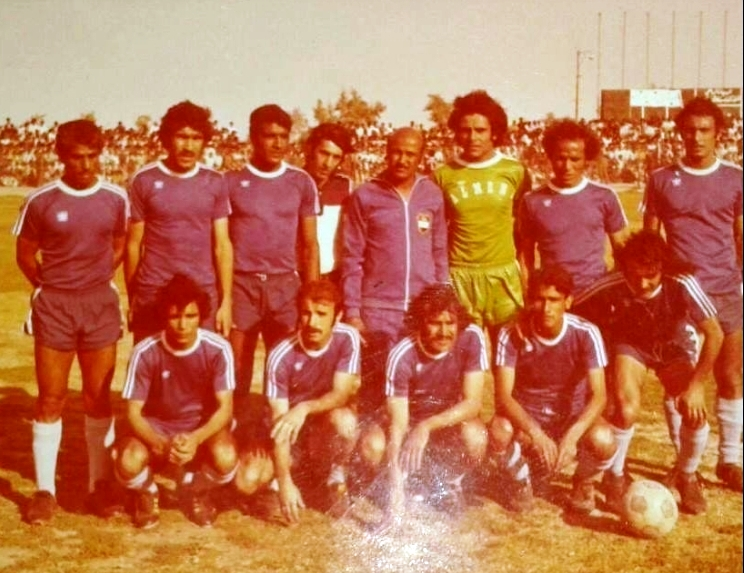
Manager Jamil Hanoon (center) with the Al-Minaa team that won the league.

The first match of this league season was on October 1, 1977, and the last match was on March 31, 1978. Al-Minaa started the first two matches under coach leadership Faleh Hassan Wasfi, who resigned after being drawn against Salahaddin 0–0 and Al-Sinaa 0–0, the team played after that under the leadership of coach Jamil Hanoon, who took over the job, and led the team to a series of successes, began to win against defending champions Al-Zawraa 2–3 in Baghdad. In the last match, Al-Minaa played against Al-Shorta at Al-Minaa Stadium in Basra, and Al-Minaa won 1–0, thanks to Jalil Hanoon's goal on 50th minutes. The Al-Minaa goalkeeper, Sattar Farhan, saved a penalty kick obtained by Al-Shorta in the final minutes of the match. In 1978–79 season, The team played under the leadership of coaches Sabeeh Abed Ali and Abdul Mahdi Hadi, and finished the season in fourth place, after being equated with second-placed; Al-Shorta and third; Al-Talaba in the number of points (15 points), who applied it on goals difference.

=== Years of war and chaos (1980–2003) ===
At the beginning of the Iran–Iraq War in 1980, Basra became a battleground, and the eight-year war broke all areas of life in Basra, including the field of sports. Al-Mina'a in particular had many players recruited and transported to the battlefield, and the team lost their playing field, and did not find a training ground. Their financial allocations were significantly reduced, and the stars of the team left to play in the big clubs of Baghdad. In this period, the Iraqi Ba'athist government worked on the separation of the club and GCPI in terms of funding, so the club has become dependent on self-financing, which was very poor, and as a result the team was composed of 11 players only (players without substitutes). In the 1985–86 season, Al-Mina'a were not able to play in Basra, due to the fall of the bombs and the lack of safe stadiums, so their matches were moved to Amarah, and because of these harsh conditions, the team finished in 14th place and were relegated to the Iraqi First Division League for the first time in its history. But the team was determined to return to play in the Iraqi Premier League, and they managed to win the Iraqi First Division League title in 1987, and thus were able to return to play in the Premier League again in the 1987–88 season. They were runners-up of the Al-Faw Liberation Championship in 1988, a tournament hosted at Al-Minaa Stadium that featured Al-Talaba, Al-Zawraa and Al-Tayaran. The club remained unstable after the Second Gulf War, which began in 1991, and Sanctions against Iraq later (1991–2003), which destroyed the sport in the whole of Iraq.

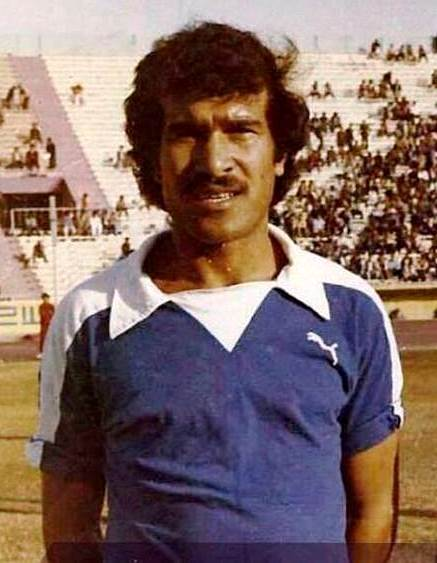
Hadi Ahmed, one of the best Al-Mina'a players for the period (1970–1985).

The ruling Ba'ath Party has been accused of treating the club with racist treatment, including the opening match of Maysan Stadium in 1987 between Al-Mina'a and Al-Rasheed (club sponsored by the ruling party in Iraq), which ended in a 0–0 draw attended by the son of president Uday Saddam Hussein, and when he found that the fans cheer for Al-Mina'a team said: "If this stadium could have been moved to Baghdad, I would have done so (this audience is not worth it)". And another of the manifestations of racism that the Ba'athist government was accused of is what happened in the league in 1991–92 season at the Al-Mina'a match against Al-Karkh, on Friday, May 8, 1992, at the Al-Minaa Stadium and the attendance of more than 20,000, which ended for Al-Karkh 3–2. The match was led by international referee Subhi Rahim, who scored an incorrect penalty against Al-Minaa and the most famous red card against Al-Mina'a player Asaad Abdul Razzaq, which led to the protest of the supporters of the club, then the Al-Karkh coach Adnan Dirjal was accused of shooting Al-Mina'a supporters from his pistol, resulting in serious injuries among supporters of the club. The Football Association punished Al-Mina'a players, and because Dirjal led the Iraq national football team in the 1994 FIFA World Cup qualification, he prevented Al-Mina'a players from playing in the national team, including Mohammed Abdul Hussein, who won the title of best player in the league for the 1992–93 season. Among the practices that one of the most important players in Al-Mina'a was exposed to, when Sabah Mirza Mahmoud, a close associate of Saddam Hussein, became president of the Al-Shabab Club and ordered Hadi Ahmed, the most important player in Al-Mina'a team, to leave his club and moving to Al-Shabab Club, but Ahmed refused because of his loyalty to the club and was severely punished. Also Uday Saddam Hussein imprisoned him in Al-Radwaniyah Prison, shaved his hair and forced him to retire.

Despite these difficult circumstances, the team managed to reach fourth place in the 8th Umm al-Ma'arik Championship and fourth place in the league in the 1998–99 season, and reach the semi-finals of the 1999–2000 Iraq FA Cup, where they were came out of the championship after losing from Al-Zawraa, who won the title that season, and in the 2002–03 Iraq FA Cup also reached the semi-finals, came out of the championship after losing from Al-Talaba, who won the title that season.

=== Gradual return and Asian prominence (2004–2006) ===
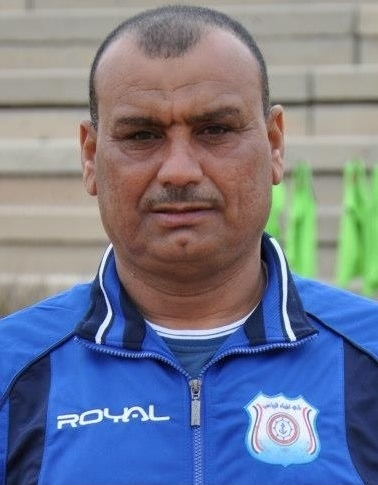
Coach Aqeel Hato, who led Al-Minaa in the 2006 AFC Champions League.

With the change that took place after the 2003 invasion of Iraq and the overthrowing of Saddam Hussein, GCPI took care of the club, and started to bring the team back to their natural position slowly, and the 2004–05 season was the distinctive season. Under the leadership of coach Abdul Karim Jassim (Jombi), Al-Minaa won the Southern Group in the First Stage, and advanced to the Elite Stage where they won Group A. In the semi-finals, they managed to beat Al-Zawraa in Baghdad 1–0 and tied 0–0 with them in Basra to advance to the final, where they played against Al-Quwa Al-Jawiya. The match was played in Baghdad which gave Al-Quwa Al-Jawiya an advantage. Al-Minaa lost the match 2–0 to take the runner-up title, and the opportunity to represent Iraq in the next AFC Champions League; the team became the first team from outside Baghdad to represent Iraq in the continental championship. After the return of the Iran–Iraq relations, Al-Minaa participated in the 2004 Peace and Friendship Cup in Ahvaz, under the leadership of coach Abdul Karim Jassim, has won the tournament, having played against Iranian clubs have won it, in semi-final, the team played against Esteghlal Ahvaz B and won 2–1, Al Mina'a's goals were scored by Nasser Talla Dahilan at the 35th minute and Qais Essa at the 75th minute. in final played against Foolad Khuzestan B and won 1–0, the winning goal was scored by Alaa Aasi at the 44th minute of the game. The team under the leadership of coach Aqeel Hato did not enter the 2006 AFC Champions League to compete for the title, given the weaknesses of the team (most of them were young and they needed experience in matches like this), but as a chance to play with strong teams and prepare for the Iraqi Premier League. But Al-Minaa embarrassed some of the big teams in Asia and by earning draws against the likes of Mash'al and Al-Hilal.

=== Last five years of local dependence (2006–2011) ===
After the team were knocked out of the AFC Champions League, the experienced players joined other clubs, and thus began a new era for the club under the leadership of young coach Asaad Abdul Razzaq for two seasons with and the young players who have grown up in the club. The team entered the 2006–07 season and managed to finish second in their First Stage group behind Al-Najaf to qualify for the Elite Stage, but team was not able to get to the semi-finals as they finished fourth behind Arbil, Al-Talaba and Karbalaa. In the 2007–08 season, a similar thing repeated under the same coach, where the team finished in 3rd place in their First Stage group behind Karbalaa and Al-Najaf, having won eight matches, drawn six and lost two, but could not go beyond the Elite Stage, where they finished in fourth place in Group A behind Arbil, Al-Quwa Al-Jawiya and Kirkuk. In the following three seasons, the team was under the leadership of young coach Adel Nasser and these were not good seasons, as they were knocked out in the First Stage in all three seasons. In the 2008–09 season, the team finished in sixth place in their group, where team won ten matches, drew six and lost eight matches, and in the 2009–10 season, the team ended up in seventh place in the group stage where they won 16 matches, drew 11 and lost seven. In pre-season and under the leadership of coach Adel Nasser, Al-Minaa won 2009 Thaghr Al Iraq Championship title, Al-Minaa qualified for the final game after collecting 7 points by defeating Naft Maysan 3–1, Ghaz Al-Junoob 4–1, and won the Thaghr Al Iraq Championship after beating Naft Al-Junoob in the final game with a score of 2–1. Al Mina'a's goals were scored by Nayef Falah in the 46th minute and Hassan Hadi Ahmad in the 79th minute. On the other hand, the sole goal of Naft Al-Junoob was scored by Muhannad Youssef at the 10th minute of the game. The two teams shared the lead of the game that was led by referee Ahmad Shaker. The referee gave red cards to 3 players: Amjad Hameed, Alaa Nayrouz from Naft Al-Junoob team and Al-Minaa player Ihsan Hadi. In the third season, 2010–11, the team under the same coach finished in fourth place in their First Stage group with 12 wins, nine draws and five defeats.

=== Eight coaches in three seasons (2011–2014) ===
The club was always praised for depending on coaches and players that had graduated from the club itself, but since the 2011–12 season, the club went a different way by contracting with a professional coach of Norwegian nationality (Iraqi origin) called Younis Al Qattan. But the club's management did not settle on one coach during the season, so they changed the coach seven times during these three years. In the 2011–12 season, the team under the leadership of Al-Qattan was not successful with two wins, two losses and six draws, so the manager was changed. The team began playing under the leadership of Rahim Hameed and they ended the Premier League in 11th place, and in the 2012–2013 season, the club returned to the local coach Aqeel Hato but this did not last very long as he was sacked having won four matches, drawn four matches and lost two matches, and the team played under the leadership of the young coach Ghazi Fahad afterwards but this also did not last long as he was fired having won five matches, drawn one match and lost five matches. The club then appointed coach Asaad Abdul Razzaq who led the team to finish the season in eighth place, having won eight matches and lost six with one draw, and the team began the season relying on foreign players. Al-Minaa used five foreign professionals from Europe, Africa and Asia in this season.

In the 2013–14 season, the same thing happened as happened in the previous season, where three coaches led the team in a row. They started the season led by coach Jamal Ali and who resigned because the results were not good, especially after the 2–1 loss to Al-Karkh. Ali won two matches as coach, drew four and lost three, so the club turned the leadership of the team to his assistant Ammar Hussein, who also did not remain long; he resigned after the 3–0 loss to Al-Zawra'a, and he won three matches, drew four and lost three. The club then appointed coach Hassan Mawla, who finished the season in 11th place, and he led the team for just four matches, winning one, losing one and drawing two, and he could not continue the rest of the matches because of Iraq Football Association suspended the Premier League and considered it finished on June 18, 2014.

=== Title challenge under Al-Sayed (2014–2016) ===
In the 2014–15 season, the team was under coach Asaad Abdul Razzaq and he was sacked after six matches because the results were not satisfactory; he won one match, lost three and drew two, leaving the team in eighth place in their First Stage group. Al-Minaa contracted with the Syrian professional coach, Hussam Al-Sayed, who led the team through 13 matches until the end of the group without a loss, where the team move into second place in the group behind Al-Shorta.

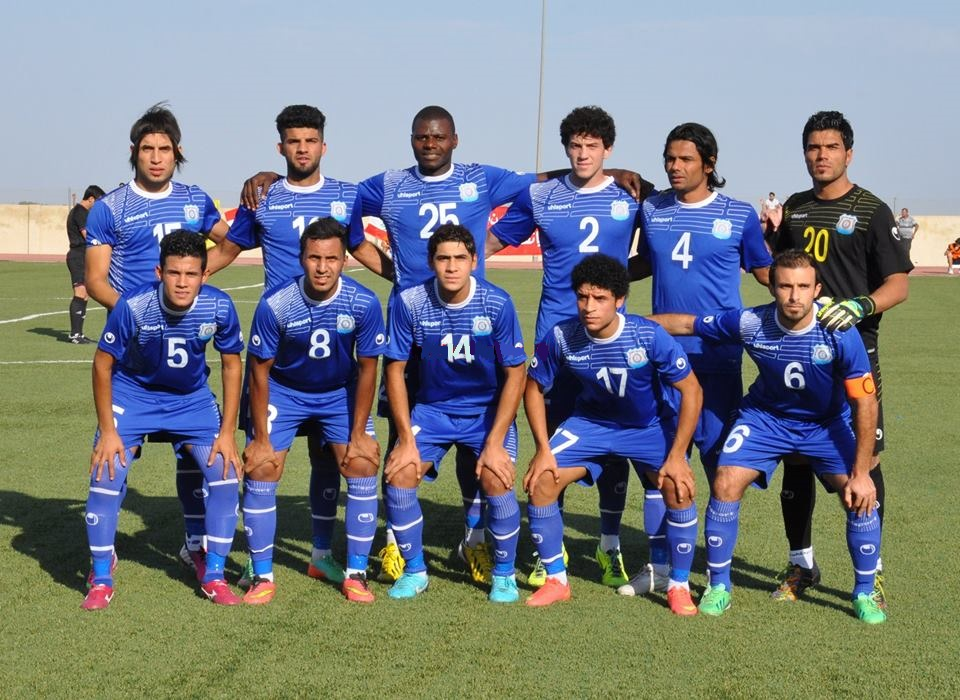
Al-Mina'a players lining up before a match in 2014.

In the Elite Stage they played against three teams (Duhok, Naft Al-Junoob and Al-Quwa Al-Jawiya). The team was competing to top the group which would have qualified them for the final, but mistakes from assistant referees shattered that dream, where the assistant referee Maitham Khamat allowed an offside goal to stand in favor of Al-Quwa Al-Jawiya against Naft Al-Junoob, while assistant referee Haider Hameed did not count a legitimate goal for Al-Mina'a against Duhok due to offside, which lost them two points. These cases deprived the team from getting to the final, where the team is equal to Al-Quwa Al-Jawiya in the number of points (ten points) but Al-Quwa Al-Jawiya had a better goal difference. In the third place match they were set to play against Al-Shorta but Al-Shorta declared that they pulled out of the match. But strangely, Al-Shorta ended up turning up for the match and Al-Mina'a was not prepared to match them so they withdrew meaning the team finished in fourth place in the Premier League.

In the 2015–16 season, the coach Hussam Al-Sayed led the team to a series of wins against strong teams, defeating the likes Erbil 3–1, Al-Quwa Al-Jawiya 2–1 and Al-Shorta 1–0. Al-Mina'a were in first place in their First Stage group, with six wins, one draw and two losses, but the many mistakes for the referees against the team and then a number of problems arose between the club management and some players and other reasons which caused a decline in the level of the team, although the team still managed to qualify for the Elite Group. Their performances in the Elite Group were not up-to-scratch, so the team ended the season in sixth place.

=== Administrative problems and relegation (2016–2022) ===
In the 2016–17 season, Al-Minaa contracted with the Romanian professional coach, Marin Ion and he was sacked after twenty-seven matches because of the chaos that appeared in the team due to the weakness of the personality of the coach, and the results were not satisfactory; he won fourteen matches, lost four and drew nine, and lost both Basra Derbies; against Al-Bahri 2–1, Naft Al-Junoob 1–0, leaving the team in fourth place in the first half of the league, then Al-Minaa signed local coach Ghazi Fahad, who finished the league in sixth place. In the 2016–17 Iraq FA Cup, Al-Minaa reached the semi-finals, but could not reach the final after losing from Naft Al-Wasat on penalties, in the match that ended 1–1. Then, the team ended the season without any good results due to several problems within the club. The administrative problems continued within the club, where two departments were formed and each claimed to be the legitimate administration. There was also a conflict between the management of the club and the Ministry of Transport (the owner), which led to a financial crisis, in which the important players migrated to the Baghdad clubs, and change of coaches in the same season was repeated within the club, all of which led to a decline in the level of the team, and ranked near the bottom of the ranking of the league teams in multiple seasons (15th place in the 2017–18 season and 17th place in the 2018–19 season). In the 2021–22 season, the level of the team declined so much that only won three matches during the whole season, and the administration resigned after the disastrous mistakes they made during the season, and a temporary administration was formed, but they could not do anything, and in the end the team occupied the 19th place (penultimate) and was officially relegated to the Iraqi First Division League.

=== Recent history (2022–) ===
After the end of the season, the Football Association did not specify the mechanism for the participation of clubs and their number in the subsequent season, and the matter remained ambiguous. Orally and in the media, the Football Association decided that the system of playing in the league will be according to the professional league system, and any club that did not complete its file according to the Club Licensing Law will not participate. The president of Football Association, Adnan Dirjal promised the president of Al-Mina'a Club and the governor of Basra that Al-Mina'a team would play in the Iraqi Premier League and not in the Iraqi First Division League if the club completed the licensing file. Based on the foregoing, the club contracted with coach Basim Qasim and five professionals, paid all their debts and completed the licensing file. But the club was surprised by the decision of the Football Association to reverse its decision to play according to the professional league system and not to accredit the licensed clubs, and that they were deceived by the Football Association.

The club entered the first division season and successfully got out the first time of asking by topping their group and defeating Amanat Baghdad to win the title.

The following season, crisis would hit Al Mina'a once again. FIFA imposed a registration ban on the club a few weeks before the start of the season due to not paying the debts owed to former players and staff. This meant that Al Mina'a had to go into the season with only the existing players under contract, all of whom were academy players or recent graduates from the academy. This led to the resignation of the entire coaching staff, starting with the manager Qahtan Chathir. Al Mina'a forfeited the 3rd match of the season, after starting the match with 8 players and having a player go off "injured" after 8 minutes, forcing the referee to end the contest. Reports were circling that the club was set to withdraw from the league season and suffer another relegation. However, Iraqi manager Hassan Ahmed decided to take over the club, and sensationally steered the side full of youth players to a 14th place finish, comfortably surviving the season.

The following season, Al-Mina'a decided to hire Pablo Grandes, who became the first Spaniard to coach the club.

== Kit ==
Al-Minaa's traditional colours are blue and white. The home kit is blue and the away kit is white. For much of Al-Minaa's history, their home colours have been bright blue shirts with white sleeves and white shorts, though this has not always been the case. The shirt was blue, and was worn with blue shorts and white socks in 1977–78 season when won league title for the first time. In some seasons the team used the home kit that was blue and painted in yellow or white, and in the away kit use the white and painted in blue or black or red or some of these colors together. But in the 1998–1999 season only the kit was green, and this was unfamiliar.

=== Historical kits ===
The first kit worn by the club in 1931
1940s–1960s seasons
1967–68 season
1977–78 League winners
1978–85 League seasons
1985–86 League
1991–92 League
1998–99 League

2000–01 League
2002–03 League
2004–05 League Final
2014–15 League
2014–15 League
2015–16 League
2016–17 League
2018–19 League

=== Kit manufacturers and shirt sponsors ===
Al-Minaa's shirts have been made by manufacturers including Adidas (from the 1970s until 1982), Puma (1982–1984), Adidas (1984–1989), Uhlsport (2001–2003), Macron (2011–2014), Uhlsport (2014–2016), Adidas (2016–2017) and Jako (2017–2018), Uhlsport (from 2018). Like those of most other Iraqi football clubs, Al-Minaa's shirts have featured sponsors' logos since the 1980s; sponsors include Samsung (1999–2000), Elaph Islamic Bank (2015–2016), Fuchs Petrolub (2016–2017), GCPI (2017–2020) and Basra Gateway Terminal (2025–2026).

== Stadium ==
Basra Sports City was a temporary ground of Al-Minaa from May 23, 2015.

Al-Minaa Stadium was founded in the 1930s and contained an open field with a stand on one side. In the 1960–61 season, lighting was installed in the stadium and the stadium was considered the second best stadium in the Arab world after the Alexandria Stadium in Egypt. In the mid-1980s, terraces with three strips were placed around stadium to accommodate 4,000 spectators. In 1995, circular strips were built around the ground to accommodate 10,000 spectators. The opening match of the new stadium was Al-Minaa match against Samarra, and ended for Al-Minaa 1–0, Adel Nasser scored from a penalty kick.

Construction work for Al-Minaa Olympic Stadium began on March 22, 2011 to be the club's new stadium with a capacity of 30,000 spectators, being built on an area of 52 acres.

Al-Minaa played at the Naft Al-Junoob Stadium during the first phase of the 2012–13 season, for the period from October 20, 2012, to March 1, 2013. In the second phase of the same season, the team was played at the Basra Stadium (Al-Jamhoriya) for the period from April 27, 2014, to September 4, and they were training at Al-Hawta Stadium in this season. On October 1, 2013, Al-Zubair Olympic Stadium was inaugurated and the team played all home matches at it, during the 2013–14 season and the 2014–15 season, and until May 23, 2015, when the Basra Sports City became a temporary stadium for the team. Since October 2017, Basra Sports City was officially leased to club.

Al-Minaa Olympic Stadium has officially become the team's home stadium on January 26, 2024.

In low attendance matches, Al-Minaa played at Basra Sports City's secondary stadium (also known as Al-Fayhaa Stadium), which has a capacity of 10,000 spectators.

On December 26, 2022, the Al-Minaa Olympic Stadium was inaugurated by the Ministry of Youth and Sports in preparation for the establishment of the 25th Arabian Gulf Cup, where the tournament will take place on this stadium in addition to the Basra Sports City. The opening included a ceremony in which the retired Al-Minaa stars were honored. After that, a friendly match took place between Al-Minaa and Kuwait SC, in which Kuwait won 2–1. Ali Hussain (57') and Taha Yassine Khenissi (66') scored the double for Kuwait, and Karrar Mohammed scored for Al-Minaa from a penalty kick in the 89th minute. On January 8, 2024, the Minister of Youth and Sports announced that Al-Minaa team will begin playing home matches on Al-Minaa Olympic Stadium starting from the fourteenth round of Iraq Stars League. On February 3, 2024, Al-Minaa played its first official match on this Stadium in the second round of the FA Cup, where it faced Naft Al-Wasat, and they were able to score three goals. The first was by Ayad Abed Farhan in the first half, and the second and third were by Salem Ahmed and Hameed Ali Hameed in the second half. The match ended 3–1, and Al-Minaa qualified for the next round of the tournament.

== Supporters ==
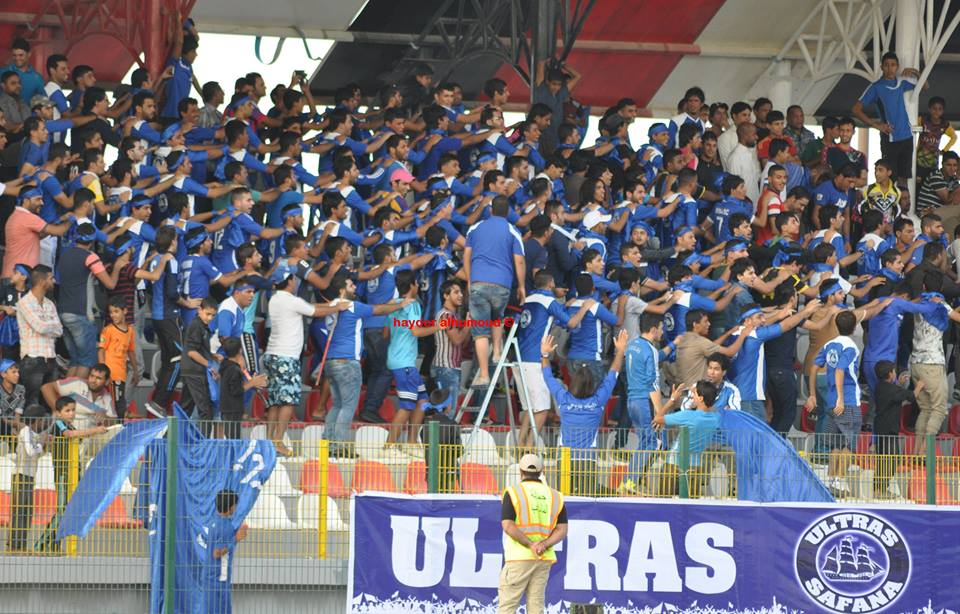
Ultras Safana during Al-Minaa match in October 2014

Al-Mina'a fans often refer to themselves as "Jamhoor Al-Safana", the name derived from the team's nickname, "Al-Safana". The fanbase is large and generally loyal; in 2014–15, Al-Mina'a had the highest average League attendance for an Iraqi club. Al-Mina'a has the Promoters Association, which was established at the beginning of the club's starting point, and remained supportive of the team in all their matches, and traveled with them wherever they went.

In June 2014, Al-Mina'a supporters founded a group known as "Ultras Safana". The supporters group has become well known throughout Iraqi football as one of the most passionate groups of football fans in Iraq and the group's banners and logos can be seen in any stadium that their club play in. The number of group members is increasing. The foundation of this group has significantly increased both the number of Al-Minaa fans in stadiums and their presence in matches. Ultras Safana won the title of Best Ultras in the Iraqi league a year after its founding, as well as in the second consecutive year. The supporters of Al-Mina'a are very many, spread throughout the provinces of Iraq, and some live outside Iraq, and was considered to be the best fans in the Iraqi league.

=== Anthem and other songs ===
The team's anthem is "Damna Mina'ee w-Areeq" by Ali Al-Bedairi & Karrar Zayed. Also anthem "Safana wel-Neim Safana" by Mohammed Abdul-Ilah. In addition to the usual Basrawi football chants, Al-Mina'a's supporters sing "Ihna Lazraq Ashqinah" and also regularly sing "Hai Hai Hai Ya Mina'ee".

== Rivalries ==
=== Basra derby ===
Al-Mina'a contest the Basra Derby with Naft Al-Basra (formerly Naft Al-Janoob until 2020). Since 2005, there have been 36 competitive Basra Derbies. Al-Minaa hold the precedence in these matches, with 14 victories to Naft Al-Basra's 9; there have been 13 draws. The most decisive result in an Al-Mina'a versus Naft Al-Basra game is Al-Mina'a's 4–1 victory at Al Mina'a Stadium, their home ground, on March 11, 2005. There have been two incidences of 3–1, Al-Minaa have been won in both matches; home in December 2005, and away in January 2006. The competition saw 66 goals scored, 37 for Al-Minaa and 29 for Naft Al-Basra; the individual player who scored the most goals was Al-Minaa player Ehsan Hadi and Naft Al-Basra player Bassim Ali, each scored four goals. And there are five players who scored for both teams, they are Alaa Aasi, Nasser Talla Dahilan, Ahmed Hassan, Sajjad Abdul Kadhim and Hossam Malik.

=== Al-Araqa derby ===
There also exists a rivalry between Al-Mina'a and Al-Quwa Al-Jawiya, which is sometimes called the Al-Araqa derby, because the two clubs are the oldest clubs in Iraq, founded in 1931.

== Players ==
=== First-team squad ===
As of 31 July 2026

Note: Flags indicate national team as defined under FIFA eligibility rules; some limited exceptions apply. Players may hold more than one non-FIFA nationality.

No.	Pos.	Nation	Player
1	GK	IRQ	Abed Saleem (vice-captain)
3	MF	ANG	Pneu Flávio
4	DF	IRQ	Saad Natiq (captain)
5	DF	TUN	Malek Miladi
6	MF	IRQ	Haider Salem
7	MF	IRQ	Mohammed Saleh
9	FW	SYR	Yassin Samia
10	MF	IRQ	Karrar Jaafar
12	GK	IRQ	Ridha Abdulaziz
15	DF	IRQ	Hassan Ali Barhi
18	MF	ARM	Solomon Udo

No.	Pos.	Nation	Player
20	MF	TUN	Houssem Habbassi
23	FW	IRQ	Aymen Luay
24	DF	IRQ	Faisal Jassim
25	MF	IRQ	Abdulrazzaq Qasim
28	DF	IRQ	Ahmed Abdul-Hussein
29	FW	IRQ	Mohammed Dawood
30	MF	SYR	Fahd Youssef
33	GK	IRQ	Abdullah Ghazi
70	DF	SYR	Khaled Kourdoghli
71	MF	IRQ	Hussein Abdul Wahed
77	DF	IRQ	Rasool Fadhil

=== Under-21s and Academy ===
As of 8 August 2026

Players to have featured in a first-team matchday squad for Al-Minaa

Note: Flags indicate national team as defined under FIFA eligibility rules; some limited exceptions apply. Players may hold more than one non-FIFA nationality.

No.	Pos.	Nation	Player
11	MF	IRQ	Hassan Hamed Khalaf
14	FW	IRQ	Zain Al-Abidin Jassim
32	GK	IRQ	Ammar Ali Abdul-Hassan
37	MF	IRQ	Hussein Makki

No.	Pos.	Nation	Player
39	MF	IRQ	Naji Nasser
50	DF	IRQ	Hussein Abdul-Qader
66	DF	IRQ	Mahdi Hashim Shihan

=== Retired numbers ===
Note: Flags indicate national team as defined under FIFA eligibility rules; some limited exceptions apply. Players may hold more than one non-FIFA nationality.

No.	Pos.	Nation	Player
20	GK	IRQ	Karrar Ibrahim (posthumous honour)

== Current staff ==
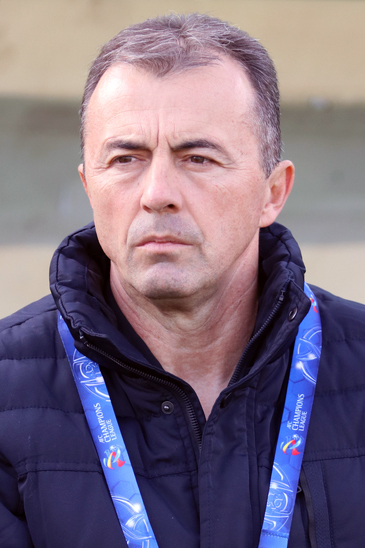
Radulović took on the task of coaching the team in October 2026.

Position	Staff
Head coach	(Montenegro) Miodrag Radulović
Assistant coach	(Iraq) Hussam Ibrahim (Montenegro) Srđan Kljajević
Goalkeeping coach	(Iraq) Oday Taleb
Fitness coach	(Montenegro) Petar Grbić
Team supervisor	(Iraq) Ali Fadhel Hassan
Under-21s coach	(Iraq) Ali Jassim
Under-19s coach	(Iraq) Mohammed Abdul Hussein
Under-17s coach	(Iraq) Fadhel Nasser
Under-16s coach	(Iraq) Fadhel Abdul Wahed
Under-14s coach	(Iraq) Munir Hamoud

== Board members ==
Note: This administrative body was chosen temporarily by the Iraqi Olympic Committee until elections are held to form an official administrative body.

Position	Staff
President	(Iraq) Asaad Al Eidani
Vice president	(Iraq) Haider Abboud Salman
Secretary	(Iraq) Ali Lafta Meraihej
Treasurer	(Iraq) Bashar Hadi Ahmed
Member of the board	(Iraq) Shaker Mahmoud Lafta (Iraq) Aqeel Taleb Al-Feraiji (Iraq) Ahmed Jassim Naeem (Iraq) Khalid Hameed Al-Saad (Iraq) Omar Alaa Ahmed

== Records ==
=== League history ===
Season	League	Position	Played	Wins	Draws	Losses	GF:GA	Points
1975–76	Iraqi National League	**4**	24	12	7	5	29:18	**31**
1976–77	Iraqi National League	**5**	11	3	6	2	12:12	**12**
1977–78	Iraqi National League	**1**	13	8	5	0	27:10	**21**
1978–79	Iraqi National League	**4**	12	5	5	2	15:9	**15**
1979–80	Iraqi National League	**10**	22	7	6	9	26:29	**20**
1980–81	Iraqi National League	**8**	11	3	4	4	8:14	**10**
1981–82	Iraqi National League	**9**	22	5	7	10	22:30	**17**
1982–83	Iraqi National League	**11**	22	3	6	13	18:32	**12**
1983–84	Iraqi National League	**12**	24	5	5	14	22:48	**15**
1984–85^{[a]}	Iraqi National League	—	—	—	—	—	—	—
1985–86	Iraqi National League ↓	**14**	15	3	3	9	13:22	**9**
1986–87	Iraqi Second Division League ↑	**1**						
1987–88	Iraqi National League	**12**	30	5	13	12	22:34	**23**
1988–89	Iraqi Pan-National League ↓	**8**	14					
1989–90	Iraqi Second Division League ↑	**1**						
1990–91	Iraqi National League	**8**	28	7	9	12	17:24	**23**
1991–92	Iraqi National League	**9**	32	12	13	13	39:42	**37**
1992–93	Iraqi National League	**11**	69	21	28	20	58:70	**70**
1993–94	Iraqi National League	**17**	50	12	21	17	42:58	**45**
1994–95	Iraqi National League	**11**	46	16	21	9	54:42	**72**
1995–96	Iraqi Advanced League	**9**	22	4	11	7	18:23	**23**
1996–97	Iraqi Premier League	**8**	30	9	10	11	22:32	**37**
1997–98	Iraqi Premier League	**7**	30	12	3	15	29:41	**39**
1998–99	Iraqi Premier League	**4**	30	14	8	8	35:29	**50**
1999–2000	Iraqi First Division League	**8**	50	20	24	6	56:28	**84**
2000–01	Iraqi Elite League	**9**	30	10	10	10	24:26	**40**
2001–02	Iraqi Elite League	**10**	38	13	10	15	39:45	**49**
2002–03^{[a]}	Iraqi First Division League	—	—	—	—	—	—	—
2003–04^{[a]}	Iraqi Premier League	—	—	—	—	—	—	—
2004–05	Iraqi Premier League	**2**	21	13	3	5	31:11	**42**
2005–06	Iraqi Premier League	**10**	16	9	4	3	26:16	**31**
2006–07	Iraqi Premier League	**7**	17	10	4	3	23:11	**34**
2007–08	Iraqi Premier League	**10**	24	10	9	5	15:18	**39**
2008–09	Iraqi Premier League	**11**	24	10	6	8	20:24	**36**
2009–10	Iraqi Premier League	**13**	34	16	11	7	36:23	**59**
2010–11	Iraqi Elite League	**7**	26	12	9	5	33:21	**45**
2011–12	Iraqi Elite League	**11**	38	13	11	14	40:44	**50**
2012–13	Iraqi Elite League	**8**	34	15	7	12	54:48	**52**
2013–14	Iraqi Premier League	**11**	23	6	10	7	26:27	**28**
2014–15	Iraqi Premier League	**4**	23	9	8	6	28:22	**35**
2015–16	Iraqi Premier League	**6**	25	11	7	7	36:30	**40**
2016–17	Iraqi Premier League	**6**	36	18	12	6	40:24	**66**
2017–18	Iraqi Premier League	**15**	38	8	17	13	34:47	**41**
2018–19	Iraqi Premier League	**17**	38	8	16	14	34:42	**40**
2019–20^{[a]}	Iraqi Premier League	—	—	—	—	—	—	—
2020–21	Iraqi Premier League	**8**	38	12	13	13	45:44	**49**
2021–22	Iraqi Premier League ↓	**19**	38	3	21	14	33:49	**30**
2022–23	Iraqi First Division League ↑	**1**	23	14	7	2	40:16	**49**
2023–24	Iraq Stars League	**12**	38	10	12	16	38:59	**42**
2024–25	Iraq Stars League	**16**	38	11	10	17	39:44	**43**
2025–26	Iraq Stars League	**15**	38	10	12	16	41:47	**42**

^{[a]} The league was not completed and was cancelled.

=== Performance in AFC competitions ===
Season	Competition	Round	Nat.	Club	Home	Away	Aggregate
2006	AFC Champions League	Group B	(United Arab Emirates)	Al-Ain	1–2	1–2	4th
2006	AFC Champions League	Group B	(Saudi Arabia)	Al-Hilal	1–1	1–3	4th
2006	AFC Champions League	Group B	(Uzbekistan)	Mash'al	0–1	2–2	4th

=== Against national teams ===
Date	Venue	Opponent	Result	Scorers	Source
May 2, 1951	Basra, Iraq	Iraq	1–1	Tariq Khalil	
December 20, 1958	Ahmadi, Kuwait	Kuwait	8–0	M. Manthar (2), K. Allawi (2), N. Lafta (2), W. Dawood (2)	
February 27, 1959	Basra, Iraq	Algeria	2–3	Sabeeh Darwish (2)	
December 20, 1972	Basra, Iraq	China	0–1		
August 21, 2015	İzmit, Turkey	Bahrain	0–0		
August 23, 2015	İzmit, Turkey	Libya	1–0	Ziyad Ahmed	
March 24, 2017	Antalya, Turkey	Turkmenistan	1–0	Ahmed Yasser	
February 25, 2018	Basra, Iraq	Iraq	0–0		

=== Top goalscorers ===
As of May 5, 2024.
Note: The statistic concerns only the goals scored in the Iraqi league since its launch in Iraq, that is, since 1974. The statistics that precede the league are unknown.
Players who are still active with the club are in bold.

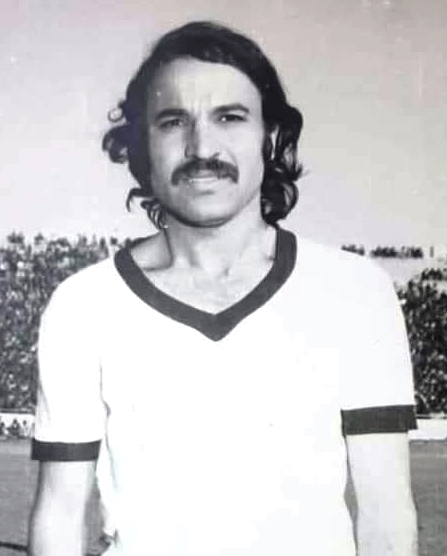
Jalil Hanoon is Al-Minaa's record goalscorer, with 73 goals in the league.

#	Nat.	Name	Goals	Hat-tricks	years
1°	Iraq	Jalil Hanoon	73	4	1969–1989
2°	Iraq	Adel Nasser	55	1	1986–2003
3°	Iraq	Mohammed Jabbar Shokan	49	1	2009–2024
4°	Iraq	Ehsan Hadi	39	2	1998–2012
5°	Iraq	Nazar Abdul Zahra	36	0	1980–1993
6°	Iraq	Nasser Talla Dahilan	33	1	1999–2013
7°	Iraq	Hussam Ibrahim	30	0	2005–2017
8°	Iraq	Ali Al-Diwan	29	0	1987–2002

== Presidents and managers ==
=== List of presidents ===
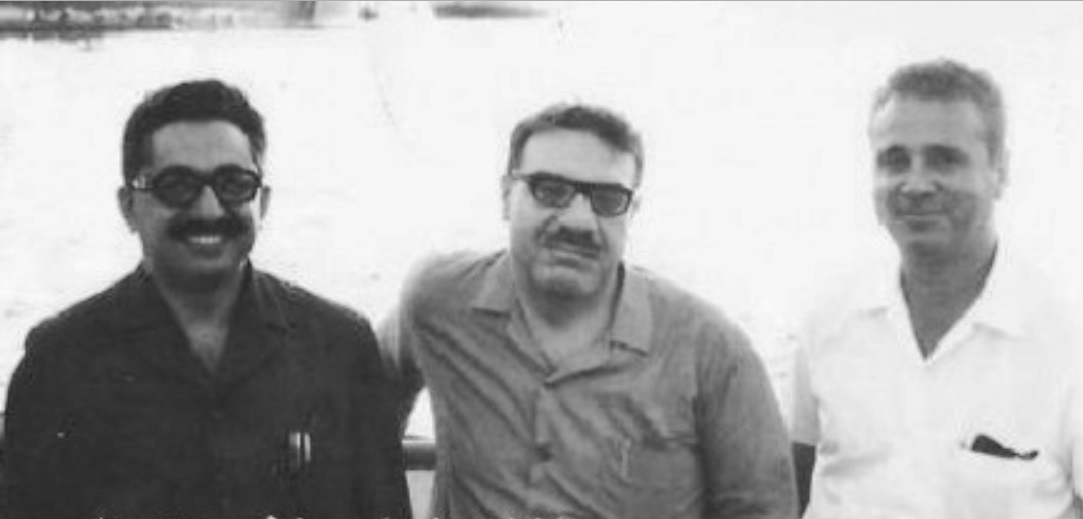
Club presidents in different periods, right to left: Yousef Al-Amer (1963–1964), Mohammed Al-Katib (1966–1967) and Adnan Al-Qassab (1969–1977).

This is a list of Al-Minaa SC presidents and chairmen from its foundation in 1931.

List of presidents
Name	Nationality	Period
C. F. Neikell	United Kingdom	1931–32
Bey Forde	United Kingdom	1932–43
Donald Langdon	United Kingdom	1944–45
Rajab Al-Ni'ma	Iraq	1946–47
R. C. Klette	United Kingdom	1947–49
G. T. Johnson	United Kingdom	1949–51
Abdul Amir Rahmatallah	Iraq	1951–62
Mohammed Al-Katib	Iraq	1962–63
Yousef Al-Amer	Iraq	1963
Nasser Mohammed Khan	Iraq	1964–66
Mohammed Al-Katib	Iraq	1966–69
Adnan Ali Al-Qassab	Iraq	1969–77
Faleh Mahmoud Al-Musa	Iraq	1977–80
Mohammed Lafta Ojoom	Iraq	February 2, 1980 – May 29, 1982
Talib Hashim Abbas	Iraq	1982–90
Abdul Wahab Al-Na'eb	Iraq	1990–92
Talib Hashim Abbas	Iraq	1992–2003
Hadi Ahmed	Iraq	2004–07
Rahim Karim	Iraq	June 2, 2007 – May 30, 2009
Salah Khudhair Abboud	Iraq	May 30, 2009 – June 1, 2012
Omran Radhi Thani	Iraq	June 1, 2012–March 13, 2016
Jalil Hanoon	Iraq	March 13, 2016–February 5, 2017
Abdul Razzaq Ahmed (interim)	Iraq	February 5, 2017–August 22, 2017
Jalil Hanoon	Iraq	August 22, 2017–August 29, 2018
Asaad Abdul Razzaq (interim)	Iraq	August 29, 2018–December 8, 2018
Hadi Ahmed	Iraq	December 8, 2018–September 4, 2019
Mohammed Jaber Al-Jaberi	Iraq	November 3, 2019–January 4, 2022
Jalil Hanoon	Iraq	January 4, 2022 – May 21, 2022
Adel Nasser (interim)	Iraq	May 21, 2022–January 26, 2023
Farhan Al-Farttousi (interim)	Iraq	January 26, 2023–October 9, 2023
Ahmed Khalaf Thijeel (interim)	Iraq	October 13, 2023–November 20, 2023
Alaa Abdul Khaliq (interim)	Iraq	November 20, 2023–January 11, 2024
Farhan Al-Farttousi (interim)	Iraq	January 11, 2024 – May 25, 2026
Haider Abboud (interim)	Iraq	May 25, 2026–August 18, 2026
Asaad Al Eidani (interim)	Iraq	August 29, 2026–Present

=== Managerial history ===
This list includes the team coaches after the end of World War II and the return of the club to engage in sports activity.

- (Iraq) Faraj Dano (1943–1948) (player-manager)
- (Iraq) Hameed Majeed (1948–1949)
- (Iraq) Karim Jaber (1953–1954)
- (Iraq) Kamel Abboudi (1954–1955)
- (Iraq) Karim Allawi Homaidi (1955–1956)
- (Iraq) Michael Stanley (1959–1961)
- (Denmark) Ingvard Hansen (1961–1963)
- (Iraq) Tariq Khalil (1963–1965)
- (Iraq) Mohammed Manthar (1965–1966)
- (Iraq) Abdul Salam Saud (1966–1967)
- (Iraq) Mohammed Manthar (1967–1968)
- (Iraq) Abdul Salam Saud (1968–1970)
- (Iraq) Jamil Mohammed Ali (1970)
- (Iraq) Hadi Hassan Wasfi (1970–1971)
- (Iraq) Hamza Qasim (1971–1973)
- (Iraq) Najem Abdullah Al-Azzawi (1973–1975)
- (Iraq) Faleh Hassan Wasfi (1975–1977)
- (Iraq) Jamil Hanoon (1977–1978)
- (Iraq) Sabeeh Abed Ali & Abdul Mahdi Hadi (1978–1979)
- (Iraq) Abdul Razzaq Ahmed (1979–1980)
- (Iraq) Jamil Hanoon (1980–1983)
- (Iraq) Abdul Razzaq Ahmed (1983–1984)
- (Iraq) Rahim Karim (1984–1986)
- (Iraq) Abdul Razzaq Ahmed (1986–1990)
- (Iraq) Hadi Ahmed (1990–1992)
- (Iraq) Jamil Hanoon (1992–1993)
- (Iraq) Sabeeh Hussein (1993–1995)
- (Iraq) Hadi Ahmed (1995–1999)
- (Iraq) Abdul Razzaq Ahmed & Hadi Ahmed (1999–2000)
- (Iraq) Hadi Ahmed (2000–2001)
- (Iraq) Aqeel Hato (2001–2003)
- (Iraq) Rahim Karim (2003–2004)
- (Iraq) Abdul Karim Jassim (2004–2005)
- (Iraq) Aqeel Hato (2005–2006)
- (Iraq) Asaad Abdul Razzaq (2006–2007)
- (Iraq) Adel Nasser (2007–2008)
- (Iraq) Abdul Karim Jassim (2008–2009)
- (Iraq) Ammar Hussein (2009)
- (Iraq) Adel Nasser (2009–2011)
- (Iraq) Younis Al-Qattan (Aug. 2011–Dec. 2011)
- (Iraq) Taher Balas (2011–2012) (caretaker)
- (Iraq) Rahim Hameed (Jan. 2012–Aug. 2012)
- (Iraq) Aqeel Hato (2012–2013)
- (Iraq) Mohammed Hussein Gholaim (Feb. 2013) (caretaker)
- (Iraq) Ghazi Fahad (Feb. 2013 – May 2013)
- (Iraq) Asaad Abdul Razzaq (May 2013–Sep. 2013)
- (Iraq) Jamal Ali (Sep. 2013–Dec. 2013)
- (Iraq) Abbas Obeid (2013–2014)
- (Iraq) Ammar Hussein (Jan. 2014 – May 2014)
- (Iraq) Hassan Muwla (May 2014–Jul. 2014)
- (Iraq) Asaad Abdul Razzaq (2014–2015)
- (Iraq) Ahmed Rahim (Jan. 2015) (caretaker)
- (Syria) Hussam Al Sayed (2015–2016)
- (Romania) Marin Ion (2016–2017)
- (Iraq) Ghazi Fahad (Apr. 2017–Aug. 2017)
- (Syria) Fajr Ibrahim (2017–2018)
- (Iraq) Nadhim Shaker (Jan. 2018 – May 2018)
- (Iraq) Ahmed Rahim (May 2018–Jun. 2018) (caretaker)
- (Iraq) Mahmoud Yasser (Jun. 2018–Jul. 2018) (caretaker)
- (Iraq) Aqeel Hato (2018–2019)
- (Tunisia) Hicham Ghazia (Feb 7–25, 2019) (caretaker)
- (Iraq) Emad Aoda (Feb. 2019 – May 2019)
- (Iraq) Ahmad Sabri (May 2019–Jul. 2019) (caretaker)
- (Romania) Valeriu Tița (2019–2021)
- (Iraq) Adel Nasser (Jan. 2021–Apr. 2021)
- (Iraq) Ahmed Rahim (Apr. 2021–Jul. 2021)
- (Iraq) Qusay Munir (Aug. 2021–Oct. 2021)
- (Iraq) Ehsan Hadi (Oct. 2021–Nov. 2021) (caretaker)
- (Iraq) Ammar Hussien (Nov 7–15, 2021)
- (Iraq) Ehsan Hadi (Nov 15–24, 2021) (caretaker)
- (Iraq) Hatif Shamran (2021–2022)
- (Iraq) Ameen Phillip (Jan. 2022–Feb. 2022)
- (Iraq) Ahmed Rahim (Feb. 2022–Mar. 2022)
- (Iraq) Hatif Shamran (Mar. 2022 – May 2022)
- (Iraq) Ali Wahab (May 2022–Jul. 2022)
- (Iraq) Basim Qasim (2022–2023)
- (Iraq) Fareed Majeed (May 2023–Jun. 2023) (caretaker)
- (Iraq) Qahtan Chathir (Aug. 2023–Nov. 2023)
- (Iraq) Asaad Abdul Razzaq (Nov 4–19, 2023)
- (Iraq) Hassan Ahmed (2023–2024)
- (Spain) Pablo Grandes (2024–2025)
- (Syria) Hussam Al Sayed (Feb. 2025–Jul. 2025)
- (Iraq) Luay Salah (2025–2026)
- (Iraq) Hussein Abdul-Wahid (Feb. 2026– Sep. 2026)
- (Montenegro) Miodrag Radulović (Oct. 2026–present)

== Notable players ==
For a list of all Al-Minaa players, see Al-Minaa SC players.

=== Captains ===
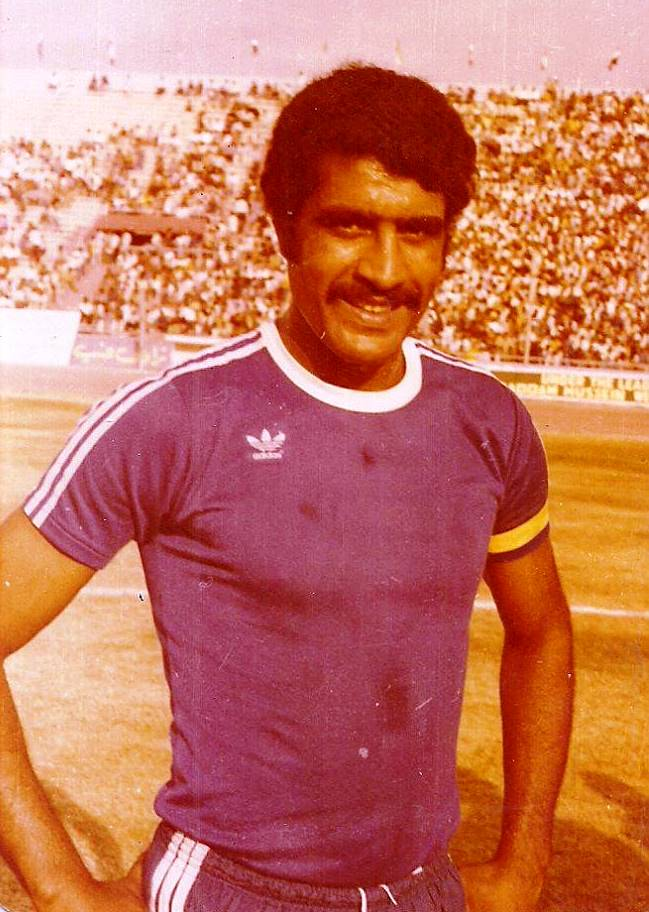
Rahim Karim, Al-Minaa captain (1978–1983), wearing the captain's armband in a match in 1979.

This list includes the team's captains since the club's participation in the Iraqi League for the first time.

Years	Position	Captain
1974–1978	Forward	(Iraq) Abdul Razzaq Ahmed
1978–1983	Defender	(Iraq) Rahim Karim
1983–1986	Midfielder	(Iraq) Hadi Ahmed
1986–1988	Forward	(Iraq) Jalil Hanoon
1988–1990	Forward	(Iraq) Aqeel Hato
1990–1991	Defender	(Iraq) Qasim Jabbar
1991–1992	Defender	(Iraq) Karim Jassim
1992–1995	Goalkeeper	(Iraq) Aqeel Abdul Mohsin
1995–1996	Defender	(Iraq) Asaad Abdul Razzaq
1996–1997	Forward	(Iraq) Mohammed Abdul Hussein
1997–2001	Defender	(Iraq) Asaad Abdul Razzaq
2001–2002	Midfielder	(Iraq) Ali Al-Diwan
2002–2003	Defender	(Iraq) Mousa Fayyadh
2003–2005	Forward	(Iraq) Ammar Hussein
2005–2008	Defender	(Iraq) Emad Aoda
2008–2010	Defender	(Iraq) Sajjad Abdul Kadhim
2010–2012	Forward	(Iraq) Mohammed Nasser Shakroun
2012–2014	Midfielder	(Iraq) Nayef Falah
2014–2015	Midfielder	(Iraq) Omar Alaa Ahmad
2015–2016	Goalkeeper	(Iraq) Karrar Ibrahim
2017	Goalkeeper	(Iraq) Noor Sabri
2017–2018	Defender	(Iraq) Mohammed Jabbar Rubat
2018–2019	Forward	(Iraq) Sultan Jassim
2019–2021	Midfielder	(Iraq) Hossam Malik
2021	Defender	(Iraq) Hamza Adnan
2021–2022	Defender	(Iraq) Ahmed Khalid
2022	Forward	(Iraq) Mohammed Jabbar Shokan
2022–2023	Defender	(Iraq) Karrar Mohammed
2023	Defender	(Iraq) Mohammed Abdul-Zahra
2023–2024	Defender	(Iraq) Abdullah Mohsin
2024–2025	Forward	(Iraq) Alaa Abdul-Zahra
2025–2026	Forward	(Iraq) Mohannad Abdul-Raheem
2026–	Defender	(Iraq) Saad Natiq

== Honours ==
=== Major ===
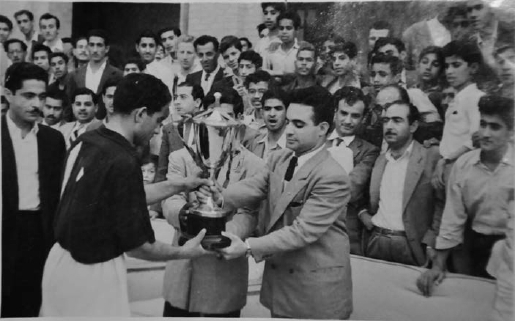
Al-Minaa captain Karim Allawi receives the Hanna Al-Sheikh trophy after the team won the championship in 1951.

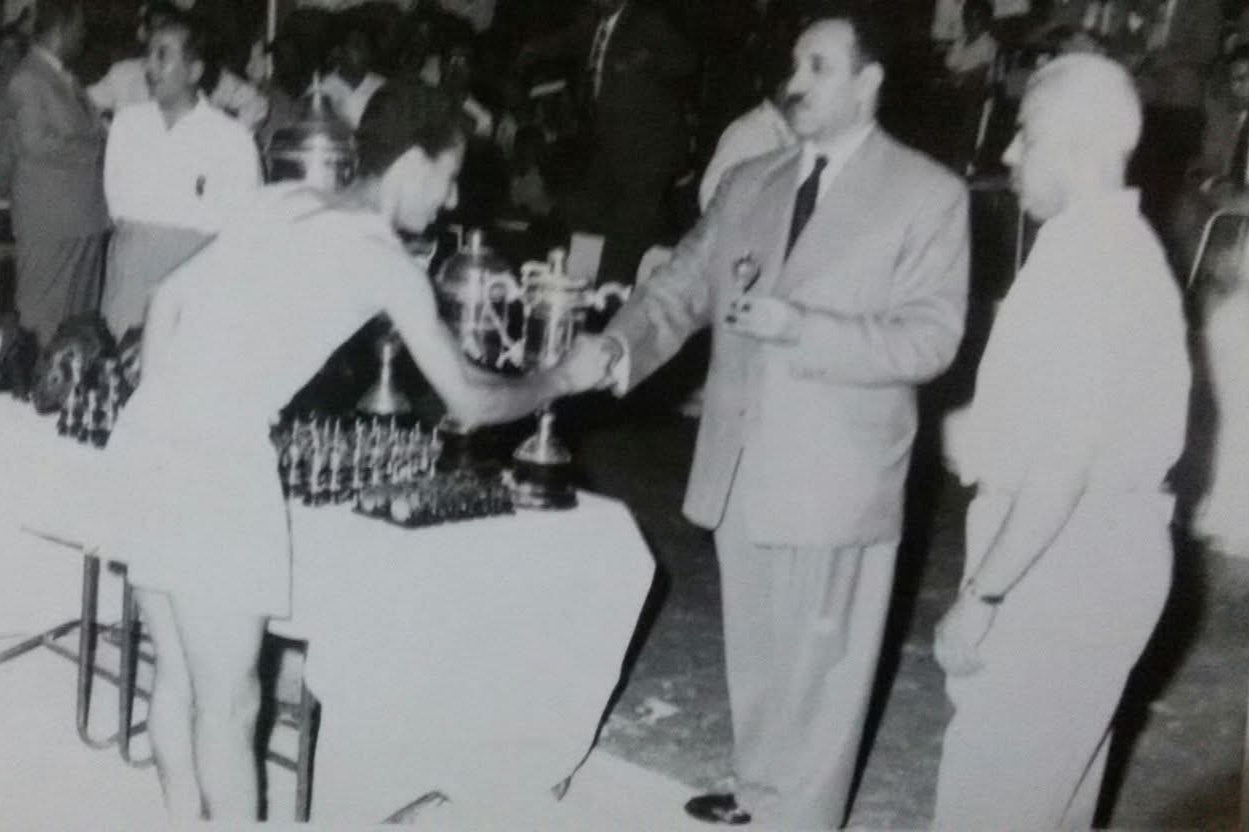
GCPI director Mizher Al-Shawi hands the trophy to Al-Minaa captain Najem Abdullah after Al-Minaa won in the Sports Week Festival final in 1962.

==== National ====
- Iraq Stars League (top tier):
  - Winners (1): 1977–78
  - Runners up (1): 2004–05
- Iraqi Premier Division League (second tier):
  - Winners (3): 1986–87, 1989–90, 2022–23 (shared record)

==== Regional ====
- Iraq FA Basra Premier League (top tier):
  - Winners (15): including 1948–49, 1962–63 (record)

=== Minor ===
- King Cup:
  - Winners (2): 1947–48, 1952–53
- Hanna Al-Sheikh Cup:
  - Winners (11): including 1947–48, 1950–51 (record)
- Al-Minaa Cup:
  - Winners (2): 1948–49, 1949–50
- Al-Shamkhany Cup:
  - Winners (2): 1947–48, 1948–49
  - Runners-up (1): 1949–50
- Thaghr al-Iraq Championship:
  - Winners (1): 2009
- Sabeeh Abed Ali Cup:
  - Winners (1): 2004
- Peace and Friendship Cup:
  - Winners (1): 2004
- Basra Mutasarrif Cup:
  - Winners (1): 1956
- Happiness Cup:
  - Winners (1): 1956
- Regent's Cup:
  - Winners (1): 1949–50
- Asfar Knockout Cup:
  - Winners (1): 1948–49
  - Runners-up (1): 1947–48
- Al-Faw Liberation Championship
  - Runners-up (1): 1988
- Industries Exhibition Cup
  - Runners-up (1): 1953–54

== Rankings ==
CWR All-Time Club World Ranking As of 4 July 2015
Rank	Club	Association	Points
2791	(Luxembourg) Alliance Dudelange	UEFA	3
2791	(Pakistan) Allied Bank Limited	AFC	3
2791	(Iraq) Al-Minaa	AFC	3
2791	(Qatar) Al-Oruba	AFC	3
2791	(Oman) Al-Orouba	AFC	3

== Other sports ==
- Football Academy
- Futsal
- Basketball
- Athletics
- Taekwondo
- Karate
- Wrestling
- Weightlifting
- Boxing
- Bodybuilding
- Futnet
