= Abdul Mahdi Hadi =

Iraqi footballer and coach (1946–2020)

Personal information
- Full name: Abdul Mahdi Hadi Taher
- Date of birth: 26 February 1946
- Place of birth: Basra, Iraq
- Date of death: 26 September 2020 (aged 74)
- Place of death: Basra, Iraq
- Position: Forward

Senior career*
Years	Team	Apps	(Gls)
1966–1978	Al-Mina'a		

International career
1970-1971	Iraq	2	(0)
- * Club domestic league appearances and goals

Abdul Mahdi Hadi (Arabic: عبد المهدي هادي; 26 February 1946 – 26 September 2020) was a coach and international Iraqi football player, he also played for Al-Minaa.

== International goals ==
Iraq national football team goals
Scores and results list Iraq's goal tally first.

#	Date	Venue	Opponent	Score	Result	Competition
1.	28 July 1970	Stadion Dresden, Dresden, East Germany	(East Germany) Dynamo Dresden	2–4	2–4	Friendly match

== Coaching career ==
=== Managerial statistics ===
Team	Nat	From	To	Record				
Team	Nat	From	To	G	W	D	L	Win %
Al-Minaa	(Iraq)	16 June 1978	17 May 1979	12	5	5	2	41.67
Total				12	5	5	2	41.67

== Death ==
After contracting COVID-19 during the COVID-19 pandemic in Iraq, Hadi died on 26 September 2020, at 74 years of age.

== Honours ==
=== Club ===
Al-Minaa

- Iraqi Premier League: 1977–78
