= Al-Minaa Olympic Stadium =

Stadium in Basra, Iraq

Al-Mina'a Olympic Stadium
- ملعب الميناء الاولمبي
- Al-Mina'a Olympic Stadium in December 2022
- Interactive map of Al-Mina'a Olympic Stadium
- Full name: Al-Mina'a Olympic Stadium
- Location: Al Maqal, Basra, Iraq
- Coordinates: 30°33′08.4″N 47°46′41.6″E
- Owner: Ministry of Youth and Sports
- Operator: Al-Minaa SC
- Capacity: 30,000
- Surface: Grass
- Scoreboard: Yes
- Field size: 105 by 68 metres (114.8 yd × 74.4 yd)

Construction
- Groundbreaking: 29 March 2011
- Opened: 26 December 2022
- Cost: $ 86 million USD
- Architect: 360 Architecture / HOK
- Services engineer: Anwar Soura General Contracting Company
- General contractor: Anwar Soura General Contracting Company

Tenants
- Al-Minaa SC: Major sporting events hosted; 25th Arabian Gulf Cup (seven matches)

Al-Mina'a Olympic Stadium is a multi-purpose stadium in Basra, Iraq which is used mostly for football matches. It is the home of Al-Minaa SC, having replaced the club's old venue Al Mina'a Stadium. The stadium has a capacity of 30,000 and it opened on 26 December 2022.

== See also ==
- List of football stadiums in Iraq
