= Ali Al-Diwan =

Iraqi footballer

Personal information
- Full name: Ali Ahmad Al-Diwan
- Date of birth: 1 July 1968
- Place of birth: Basra, Iraq
- Date of death: 18 June 2006 (aged 37)
- Place of death: Basra, Iraq
- Position: Midfielder

Youth career
- 1984–1986: Al-Mina'a

Senior career*
Years	Team	Apps	(Gls)
1986–1987	Al-Bahri		
1987–2002	Al-Minaa		

International career
1993–	Iraq		

Managerial career
- 2003–2005: Al-Mina'a U-16
- * Club domestic league appearances and goals

Ali Ahmad Al-Diwan (Arabic: عَلِيّ أَحْمَد الدِّيوَان; 1 July 1968 – 18 June 2006), was an Iraqi international footballer who played midfielder, spent the majority of his career with Al-Minaa club. He is son of former international multi-sports player Ahmed Al-Diwan.

== Death due to serious illness ==
Ali was ill with a severe disease that lasted several years until he died on June 18, 2006.

== Sporting events in honor of Al-Diwan ==
On March 3, 2013 the Martyr Al-Hakim Foundation for youth and sport and in collaboration with The youth and sport province of Basra established sports championship football on behalf of the players: Nazar Abdul Zahra and Ali Al-Diwan, the first match was among the pioneers of Al-Zawraa team led by Falah Hassan and pioneers of Al-Minaa team led by Jalil Hanoon, where 36 teams participated in this tournament.
