= Sabeeh Abed Ali =

Iraqi footballer

Personal information
- Full name: Sabeeh Abed Ali
- Date of birth: 1 July 1948
- Place of birth: Basra, Iraq
- Date of death: 1993 (aged 44–45)
- Position: Defender

Senior career*
| Years | Team | Apps | (Gls) |
| 1967–1978 | Al-Mina'a | | |

International career
| 1971–1975 | Iraq U-23 | | |
| 1969–1975 | Iraq | 55 | (0) |
- * Club domestic league appearances and goals

Sabeeh Abed Ali (Arabic: صَبِيح عَبْد عَلِيّ, 1948 – 1993), was a coach and former international Iraqi football player, who played for Iraq in the 1972 AFC Asian Cup qualification and 1974 FIFA World Cup qualification, he also played for Al-Minaa.

== Honours ==
=== Local ===
Al-Mina'a

- 1978 Iraqi League: Champion

=== International ===
Iraq

- 1972 World Military Championships: Champion
