= Hamza Qasim =

Iraqi footballer (born 1933)

Personal information
- Full name: Hamza Qasim
- Date of birth: 1 July 1933 (age 93)
- Place of birth: Basra, Iraq
- Position: Goalkeeper

Team information
- Current team: Retired

Senior career*
Years	Team	Apps	(Gls)
1952–1954	Al-Maaref team		
1954–1964	Al-Minaa		

International career
1956–1959	Iraq		

Managerial career
- 1971–1974: Al-Minaa
- * Club domestic league appearances and goals

Hamza Qasim (Arabic: حَمْزَة قَاسِم; born 1 July 1933) is a retired Iraqi football goalkeeper, who played with the Iraq national team in the 1957 Pan Arab Games. He also played for Al-Minaa.

== Coaching career ==
Qasim served as coach for Al-Minaa from 1971 to 1974.

== Multi-talent and activities ==
Qasim was born in Basra, and was a multi-sport athlete. In addition to being an international footballer, he was a basketball player for the Iraq national basketball team. He was also a competitor in athletics (high jump and 110 metres hurdles).

Qasim founded the first Iraqi Badminton Federation, and founded the first team for badminton in Iraq, establishing men's and women's teams in 1970s.

== Personal life ==
Qasim is married to Iraqi actress Salima Khudhair and lives with her in Baghdad. and they had one son, actor Wissam Hamza, who died in an accident in Syria in 2011.
