= Jamil Hanoon =

Iraqi footballer and coach

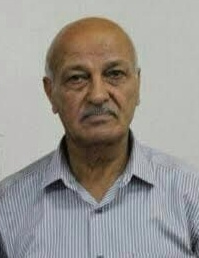

Personal information
- Full name: Jamil Hanoon Matar Al-Asadi
- Date of birth: 1 July 1942 (age 84)
- Place of birth: Basra, Iraq

Senior career*
Years	Team	Apps	(Gls)
1960–1976	Al-Mina'a		

International career
1969	Iraq	3	(0)

Managerial career
- 1977–1978: Al-Minaa
- 1980–1983: Al-Minaa
- 1984–1991: Al-Bahri
- 1992–1993: Al-Minaa
- 1998–1999: Al-Bahri
- * Club domestic league appearances and goals

Jamil Hanoon (Arabic: جَمِيل حَنُّون , born 1 July 1942) is a coach and former international Iraqi football player, he also played for Al-Minaa.

== International career ==
Jamil Hanoon was called by Croatian coach Ljubomir Kokeza to play in the 1969 Jaam-e-Doosti Friendship Cup in Iran. On 7 March 1969, he played his debut with Iraq against Iran in a fully international match that ended 2–1 for Iran.

== Managerial career ==
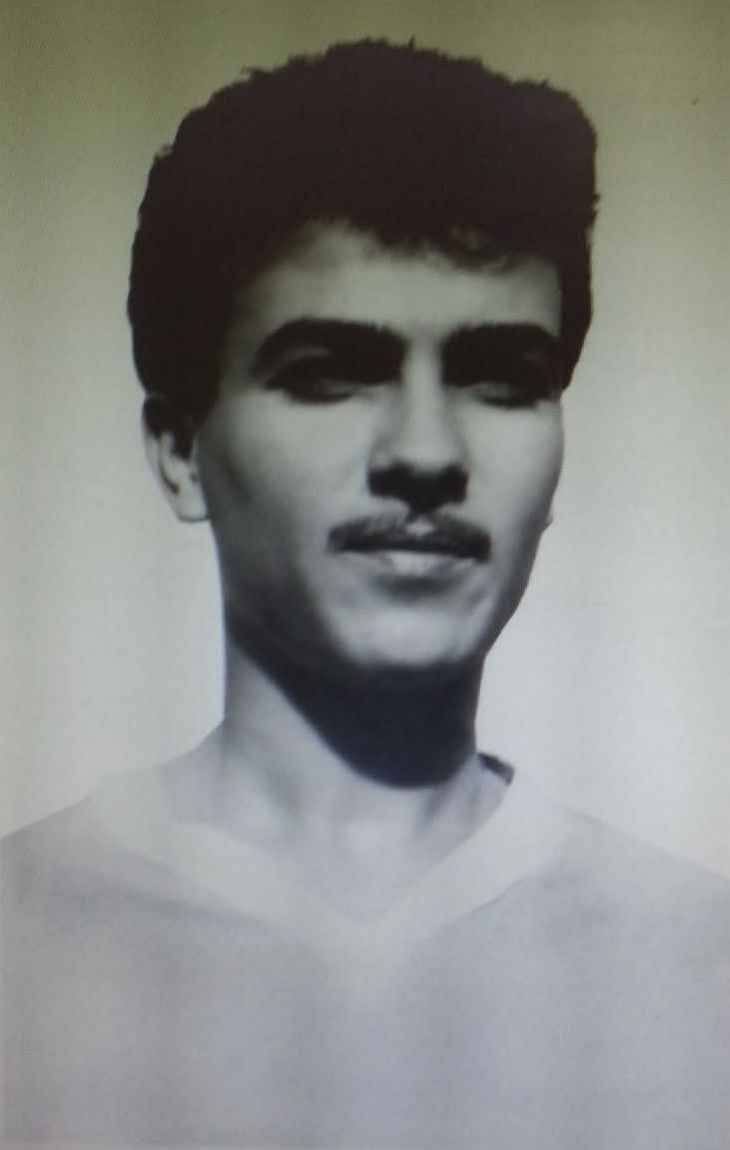
Jamil Hanoon in 1960

In 1977 Hanoon started training with his club Al-Minaa, which he retired from, and in the Iraqi Premier League in the 1977-1978 season after former coach Faleh Hassan Wasfi failed to win the first two games and resigned. Hanoon led Al-Minaa team in a series of excellent results and won the league title in that season without any loss.

In 1984, he began coaching Al-Bahri in the Second Division, and a year later, he won the title and promoted the team to the Premier League.

== Personal life ==
His father, Hanoon Matar, was a striker for Al-Minaa in the 1940s and passed on his love of football to his four sons: Jamil, Jalil, Jabbar, and Saadi. Jamil is the older brother of international player and coach Jalil Hanoon. His two brothers also played football: Jabbar Hanoon, who played for a military team participating in the Army League, and Saadi Hanoon, who played for a local team in his hometown of Basra.

== Managerial statistics ==
Team	Nat	From	To	Record				
Team	Nat	From	To	G	W	D	L	Win %
Al-Minaa	(Iraq)	16 October 1977	27 March 1978	13	10	3	0	76.92
Al-Minaa	(Iraq)	1 September 1980	27 March 1983	55	11	17	27	20.00
Al-Minaa	(Iraq)	3 August 1992	1 July 1993	69	21	28	20	30.43
Total				137	42	48	47	30.66

== Honours ==
=== Player ===
Al-Minaa

- Iraq FA Basra Premier League: 1962–63

=== Manager ===
Al-Minaa

- Iraq Stars League: 1977–78

Al-Bahri

- Iraqi Premier Division League: 1985–86
