= Adel Nasser =

Iraqi footballer and coach

Personal information
- Full name: Adel Nasser Shakroun
- Date of birth: 1 July 1970 (age 56)
- Place of birth: Basra, Iraq
- Position: Midfielder

Youth career
- –1986: Al-Asma'ee

Senior career*
Years	Team	Apps	(Gls)
1986–1987	Al-Minaa		
1987–1988	Al-Najaf		
1988–1993	Al-Minaa		
1993	Al-Zawraa		
1993–2000	Al-Minaa		
2000–2001	Al-Tali'aa Taizz		
2001–2003	Al-Minaa		
2003–2004	Naft Al-Janoob		

International career
1993–1999	Iraq		

Managerial career
- 2007–2011: Al-Minaa
- 2012–2014: Naft Al-Janoob
- 2016: Al-Diwaniya
- 2017–2019: Naft Al-Janoob
- 2021: Al-Minaa
- * Club domestic league appearances and goals

Adel Nasser Shakroun (Arabic: عَادِل نَاصِر شَكْرُون; born 1 July 1970) is an Iraqi football coach and former player who is a coach for Iraqi club Naft Al-Junoob.

A midfielder, Shakroun played for the Iraq national team between 1993 and 1999.

== Coaching career ==
Nasser iwas head coach of Naft Al-Junoob in 2018–19. He started coaching Al-Basra from 19 January 2017.

== Personal life ==
Adel is the older brother of former international player Mohammed Nasser Shakroun.

== Managerial statistics ==
As of 20 May 2021

Managerial record by team and tenure
Team	From	To	Record				
Team	From	To	P	W	D	L	Win %
Al-Mina'a	9 November 2008	27 August 2011	82	37	26	19	45.1
Naft Al-Junoob	20 August 2012	1 March 2014	47	14	16	17	29.8
Al-Diwaniya	27 November 2016	3 December 2016	1	0	0	1	0.0
Naft Al-Junoob	19 January 2017	28 July 2019	107	34	30	43	31.8
Al-Mina'a	23 January 2021	11 April 2021	15	6	5	4	40.0
Duhok SC	13 April 2021	""Present""	4	2	0	2	50.0
Total			256	93	77	86	36.3

== Honours ==
=== Manager ===
Al-Minaa

- Thaghr al-Iraq Championship: 2009
