= Hanna Al-Sheikh Cup =

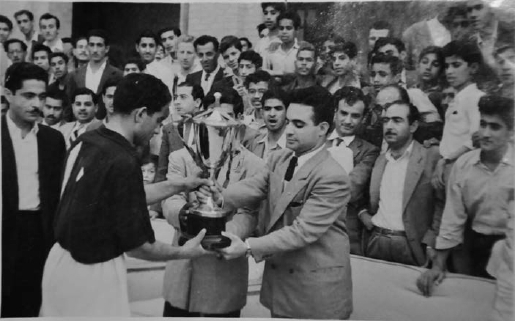
- Al-Minaa captain Karim Allawi receives the Hanna Al-Sheikh trophy in 1951.
- Founded: 1945
- Region: Iraq
- Teams: 6
- Current champions: Al-Mina'a
- Most championships: Al-Mina'a

Hanna Al-Sheikh Championship (also known as Hanna Al-Sheikh Cup) was the first known football competition in Basra, held annually. Six clubs in Basra were involved in the tournament.

This tournament began in the 1945. The last season was in 1968 because the founder and sponsor of the competition migrated out of Iraq.

== Participating Clubs ==
Some of the clubs that participated in the tournament included Al-Ittihad, Al-Ittihad Al-Malaki, Al-Jubaila, Al-Minaa, Sharikat Naft Al-Basra, and Thanawiyat Al-Basra.

== See also ==
- Iraq FA Cup
- Iraqi Premier League
- Iraq Football Association
- 17 July Revolution
