= Rahim Karim Bdaiwi =

Iraqi footballer and coach

Rahim Karim
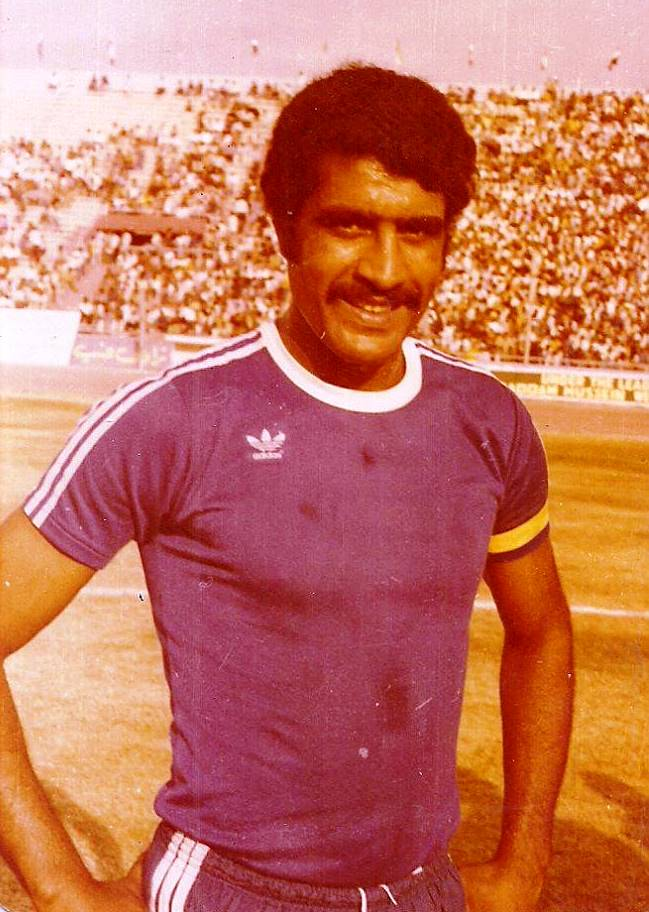

Personal information
- Full name: Rahim Karim Bdaiwi
- Date of birth: February 2, 1952 (age 74)
- Place of birth: Basra, Iraq
- Position: Defender

Senior career*
Years	Team	Apps	(Gls)
1970–1985	Al-Minaa		

International career
1969–1973	Iraq U-20	7	(0)
1972–1974	Iraq U-23	4	(0)
1971–1977	Iraq	31	(0)
- * Club domestic league appearances and goals

Rahim Karim (Arabic: رحيم كريم , born 2 February 1952) is a coach and former international Iraqi football player, who played for Al-Minaa.

== Honors ==
=== Local ===
Al-Mina'a

- 1978 Iraqi League: Champion

=== International ===
Iraq

- 1977 World Military Cup: Champion
