= Abdul Razzaq Ahmed =

Iraqi former football forward

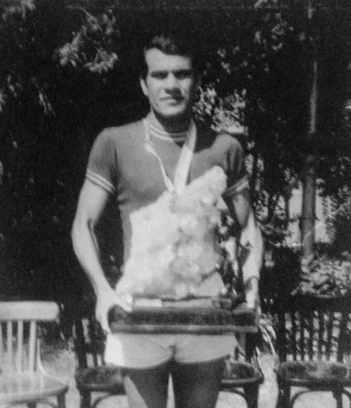

Personal information
- Full name: Abdul Razzaq Ahmed Basheer
- Date of birth: 1 July 1944 (age 82)
- Place of birth: Basra, Iraq
- Position: Forward

Senior career*
Years	Team	Apps	(Gls)
1962–1979	Al-Minaa		

International career
1971–1972	Iraq U23	3	(0)
1970–1974	Iraq	19	(3)
- * Club domestic league appearances and goals

Abdul Razzaq Ahmed Basheer (Arabic: عَبْد الرَّزَّاق أَحْمَد بَشِير; born 1 July 1944) is an Iraqi former football forward who played for Iraq in the 1972 AFC Asian Cup qualification and 1974 FIFA World Cup qualification. He also played for Al-Minaa.

Abdul Razzaq is currently working as coach, he has coached several clubs, including Al-Minaa, Naft Al-Janoob, Ghaz Al-Janoob and Al-Bahri.

Razaq is the older brother of international player and coach Hadi Ahmed.

== Club career ==
Razzaq was part of Al-Minaa club and captain when the team won the Iraqi league title for the first time in its history in 1977–78 season.

== International career ==
On October 26, 1970, Abdul Razzaq made his first international cap and goal with Iraq national football team against Yugoslav Club RNK Split at Sarajevo in a friendly match.

=== 1972 World Military Cup ===
Abdul Razzaq was instrumental in Iraq winning the 1972 World Military Cup title for the first time in his history. He scored 2 goals in the tournament including the equalizer against Turkey 2–2 and Italy 1–1 as well as an assist, and positive attacking play made him one of the stars of the tournament.

=== 1972 AFC Asian Cup ===
Abdul Razzaq was called up by national team coach Yuri Illichev to the 1972 AFC Asian Cup qualification. He scored 2 goals in the tournament including the first goal against Jordan in the match which Iraq won 2–0 and against Lebanon in the match which Iraq won 4–1 where Iraq won first place in the group stage to qualify for the 1972 AFC Asian Cup. Abdul Razzaq was called up by national team coach Abdelilah Mohammed Hassan to the 1972 AFC Asian Cup which Iraq did not achieve a positive outcome.

=== 1972 Palestine Cup ===
Abdul Razzaq was called up by national team coach Adil Basher to the 1972 Palestine Cup of Nations which Iraq won runner-up, Abdul Razzak scored one goal in the tournament against Libya.

=== 1974 FIFA World Cup qualification ===
Abdul Razzaq was called up by national team coach Gyula Teleki to the 1974 FIFA World Cup qualification, in the first appearance of Iraq in qualifying, he did not play in the first match against Australia, the only match lost by Iraq in the qualifiers, but he participated in the second match, which Iraq defeated New Zealand 2–0, and participated in all four matches.

== International goals ==
Iraq national football team goals
Scores and results list Iraq's goal tally first.

#	Date	Venue	Opponent	Score	Result	Competition
1.	18 December 1971	Al Kuwait Sports Club Stadium, Kuwait City, Kuwait	Jordan	1–0	2–0	1972 AFC Asian Cup qualification
2.	25 December 1971	Al Kuwait Sports Club Stadium, Kuwait City, Kuwait	Lebanon	4–1	4–1	1972 AFC Asian Cup qualification
3.	5 January 1972	Al-Shaab Stadium, Baghdad, Iraq	Libya	3–0	3–0	1972 Palestine Cup of Nations

== Honours ==
=== Local ===
- Iraqi League: 1977–78.

=== International ===
- World Military Cup: 1972
