= Hadi Ahmed =

Iraqi footballer and coach

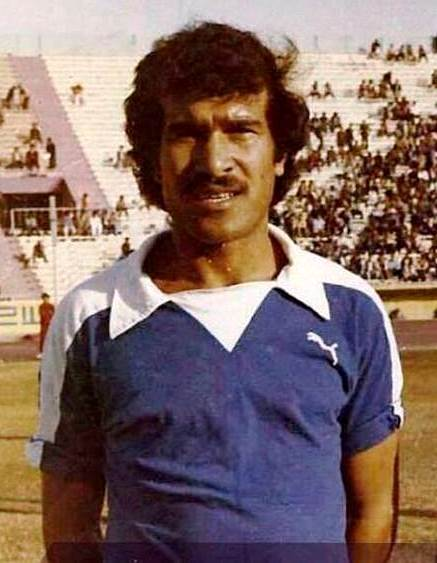

Personal information
- Full name: Hadi Ahmed Basheer
- Date of birth: 1 November 1951 (age 74)
- Place of birth: Basra, Iraq
- Height: 1.84 m (6 ft 0 in)
- Position: Midfielder

Youth career
- 1965–1970: Al-Mina'a

Senior career*
Years	Team	Apps	(Gls)
1970–1985	Al-Mina'a		

International career
1975–1979	Iraq military		(1)
1975–1982	Iraq	79	(12)

Managerial career
- 1983–1987: Al-Rumaila
- 1988–1992: Al-Minaa
- 1994–1999: Al-Minaa
- 1999–2000: Al-Ahli Manama
- 2000–2002: Al-Minaa
- 2002–2004: Sitra
- * Club domestic league appearances and goals

Hadi Ahmed Basheer (Arabic: هَادِي أَحْمَد بَشِير; born November 1, 1951) is an Iraqi football coach and former player. He played as a midfielder and spent the majority of his career with Al-Minaa club.

He was capped Iraqi League title for Al-Mina'a in 1978, and appeared at the World Military Cup 1977, He played matches in Pestabola Merdeka 1977 in Malaysia. Hadi played in the Moscow Olympics in 1980, where his goal was the debut Iraqi goal in Olympic competition, against Costa Rica; sports fans called him: the (Maestro of Iraqi football). He played in 5th Arabian Gulf Cup in 1979 and scored two goals, the first goal against Emirates, and the second against Kuwait, and won the best player title of the tournament. He took part in the three seasons of the tournament (1976, 1979 and 1982) and scored the goal of No. 200 in the tournament's history.

Hadi's older brother, Abdul Razzaq, was playing with him in Al-Mina'a (captain), Hadi has influenced his style.

== International career ==
On April 2, 1975 Hadi Ahmed played his debut with Iraq against Qatar in a fully international match, in the 1976 AFC Asian Cup qualification in Baghdad, which ended 1-0 for Iraq.

On March 26, 1982 Hadi Ahmed played his last international match with Iraq against Qatar, within the 6th Arabian Gulf Cup in UAE, which ended 2-1 for Iraq.

== International goals ==
Scores and results list Iraq's goal tally first.

#	Date	Venue	Opponent	Score	Result	Competition
1.	5 November 1975	Al-Shaab Stadium, Baghdad	Saudi Arabia	1–1	1–1	1976 AFC Asian Cup qualification
2.	30 November 1975	Al-Shaab Stadium, Baghdad	Afghanistan	4–0	4–0	1976 AFC Asian Cup qualification
3.	27 November 1977	Al-Shaab Stadium, Baghdad	Morocco	2–0	3–0	Friendly match
4.	26 July 1978	KLFA Stadium, Kuala Lumpur	Malaysia	2–1	2–1	1978 Pestabola Merdeka
5.	25 February 1979	Al-Shaab Stadium, Baghdad	Finland	1–0	1–0	Friendly
6.	29 March 1979	Al-Shaab Stadium, Baghdad	Kuwait	2–1	3–1	5th Arabian Gulf Cup
7.	3 April 1979	Al-Shaab Stadium, Baghdad	United Arab Emirates	1–0	5–0	5th Arabian Gulf Cup
8.	16 March 1980	Al-Shaab Stadium, Baghdad	Jordan	1–0	4–0	1980 Olympics qualifiers
9.	16 March 1980	Al-Shaab Stadium, Baghdad	Jordan	2–0	4–0	1980 Olympics qualifiers
10.	21 July 1980	Republican Stadium, Kiev	Costa Rica	1–0	3–0	1980 Summer Olympics
11.	25 March 1981	Malaz Stadium, Riyadh	Bahrain	1–0	2–0	1982 FIFA World Cup qualification
12.	16 September 1981	KLFA Stadium, Kuala Lumpur	Singapore	3–0	4–0	1981 Pestabola Merdeka

== Honors ==
=== Local ===
Al-Mina'a

- 1978 Iraqi League: Champion

=== International ===
Iraq

- 1977 World Men's Military Cup: Champion
- 1977 Pestabola Merdeka: runner-up
- 1979 Arabian Gulf Cup: Champion
- 1981 Pestabola Merdeka: Champion
