= Faleh Hassan Wasfi =

Iraqi footballer and coach

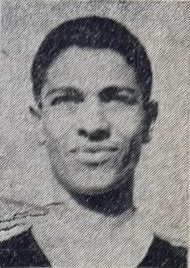
- Faleh Hassan Wasfi in 1964

Personal information
- Full name: Faleh Hassan Wasfi
- Place of birth: Basra, Iraq
- Position: Attacking midfielder

Senior career*
Years	Team	Apps	(Gls)
- Al-Mina'a

International career
1964	Iraq		
- * Club domestic league appearances and goals

Faleh Hassan Wasfi (Arabic: فَالِح حَسَن وَصْفِيّ , is a coach and former international Iraqi football player, he also played for Al-Minaa.

== Honors ==
=== International ===
Iraq

- 1964 Arab Nations Cup: Champion
