= State Company for Iraqi Ports =

Government-owned company of Iraq

- الشركة العامة لموانئ العراق

Agency overview
- Jurisdiction: Iraq
- Headquarters: Baghdad
- Agency executive: Aziz Hashim, Director General
- Parent agency: Ministry of Transportation
- Website: scp.gov.iq

State Company for Iraqi Ports is a state-owned company under the Ministry of Transportation in the Republic of Iraq. It was founded on October 9, 1919. it is concerned with the management of Iraqi ports and navigation in the territorial waters and carries out maintenance and dredging in the navigational channels that the company manages.

The company manages Umm Qasr port, Khor Al-Zubair port, Al-Maqal Port, and Abu Flous Port.
