= 2004 Peace and Friendship Cup (Ahvaz) =

Tournament details
- Host country: Iran
- Dates: 16–18 February 2004
- Teams: 4 (from 1 confederation)
- Venues: 2 (in 1 host city)

Final positions
- Champions: (Iraq) Al-Mina'a (1st title)
- Runners-up: (Iran) Foolad Khuzestan B
- Third place: (Iran) Esteghlal Ahvaz U20
- Fourth place: (Iraq) Naft Al-Junoob

Tournament statistics
- Matches played: 4
- Goals scored: 16 (4 per match)

The 2004 Peace and Friendship Cup was a two-day preseason men's football friendly tournament hosted by Persian Gulf Pro League clubs Foolad Khuzestan B and Esteghlal Ahvaz U20. The tournament was played between clubs from the cities of Ahvaz, Iran, and Basra, Iraq; both cities are located on the Shatt al-Arab.

The lone edition of the tournament took place on 16 and 18 February 2004 and featured Foolad Khuzestan B, Esteghlal Ahvaz U20, Al-Mina'a, and Naft Al-Junoob.

The winners of the tournament were Al-Mina'a, who defeated Foolad Khuzestan B in the final.

== Competition format ==
The competition has the format of a regular knock-out competition. The winners of each of the two matches on the first day compete against each other for the tournament title, while the two losing sides play in a third-place match. The trophy is contested over two days, with two matches being played on each day.

Semi-finals
16 February 2004
(Iran) Esteghlal Ahvaz U20	0
(Iraq) Al-Minaa	2
16 February 2004
(Iran) Foolad Khuzestan B	3
(Iraq) Naft Al-Junoob	2

Final
18 February 2004
(Iraq) Al-Minaa	1
(Iran) Foolad Khuzestan B	0
Third place play-off
18 February 2004
(Iran) Esteghlal Ahvaz U20	5
(Iraq) Naft Al-Junoob	3

== Matches ==
Semi-finals

16 February 2004
14:00 GMT

Esteghlal Ahvaz U20 (Iran)	0–2	(Iraq) Al-Mina'a
		35' Talaa; 75' Essa

Takhti Stadium, Ahvaz, Iran

16 February 2004
14:00 GMT

Foolad Khuzestan B (Iran)	3–2	(Iraq) Naft Al-Junoob
Molaye 46'; Shaverdi 50'; Badavi 108'		Abdul-Kadhim; Shayel

Foolad Khuzestan Stadium, Ahvaz, Iran

Third place match

18 February 2004
14:00 GMT

Esteghlal Ahvaz U20 (Iran)	5–3 (a.e.t.)	(Iraq) Naft Al-Junoob

Takhti Stadium, Ahvaz, Iran

Final

18 February 2004
14:00 GMT

Foolad Khuzestan B (Iran)	0–1	(Iraq) Al-Mina'a

Foolad Khuzestan Stadium, Ahvaz, Iran

2004 Peace and Friendship Cup Winners
(Iraq) Al-Mina'a SC
