= Al-Mina'a Stadium =

Stadium in Basra, Iraq

Coordinates: 30.552356°N 47.778155°E

Al Mina'a Stadium is a multi-use stadium in Basra, Iraq. It is currently used mostly for football matches and served as the home stadium of Al Minaa before the opening of Al-Minaa Olympic Stadium. The stadium holds 10,000 people.
