= Port of Basra =

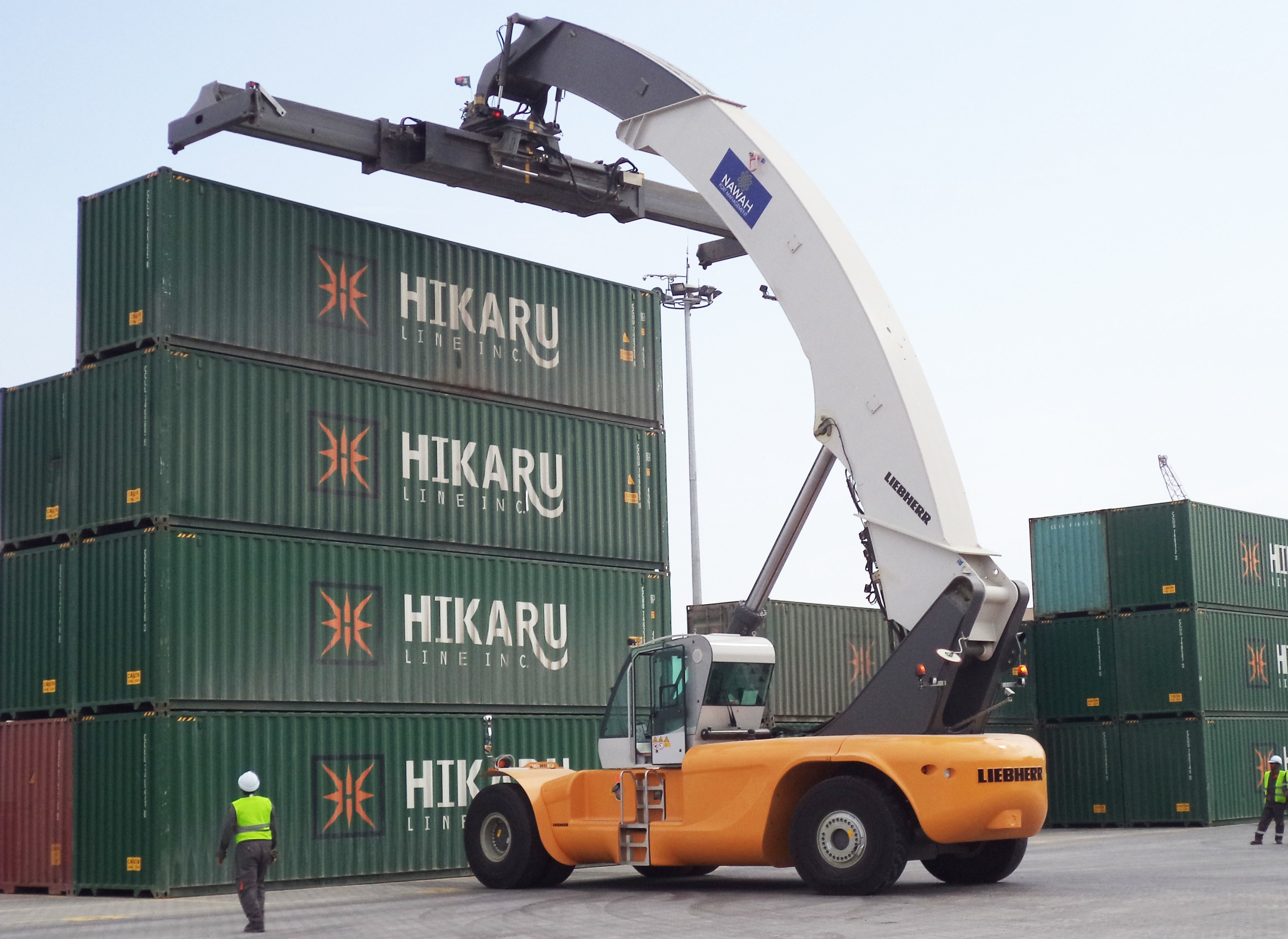
- NAWAH equipment stacking containers at the Port of Basra.
- Interactive map of Port of Basra
- Native name: ميناء البصرة (Arabic)

Location
- Country: Iraq
- Location: Basra, Iraq
- Coordinates: 30°22′00″N 47°48′00″E

Details
- Built: 1919
- Opened: 1919
- Closed: 2003
- Operated by: NAWAH Port Management
- Owned by: Government of Iraq
- Type of Harbor: Seaport
- No. of berths: 15 (11 operational)

The Port of Basra, also known as Al Maqal Port, is an Iraqi port in Basra, situated on the Persian Gulf.

== Location ==
The Port of Basra is situated in downtown Basra City, Iraq, on the banks of the Shatt Al-Arab River, approximately 135 kilometers upstream from the mouth of the river. The port is strategically located near several of Iraq's major oil and gas fields.

Coordinates: Latitude: 30°22' North, Longitude: 47°48' East.

== History ==
=== Construction ===
The Port of Basra began operations in 1919, having been constructed under the aegis of the British Army, who occupied Mesopotamia during the First World War. Iraq's first modern port, it was intended by the British to serve as a major commercial and mercantile hub, servicing Basra itself but also acting as a valuable economic bridge between Europe and Asia.

=== Iran-Iraq War ===
The Port of Basra ceased to be fully operational in 1980 due to the Iran–Iraq War. The majority of the combat during that eight-year conflict occurred in southern Iraq along the Iranian border, where the port sustained damage from Iranian missile and artillery attacks. The port experienced a steady decline in operations in the ensuing years, ultimately closing in 2003. The Port of Basra has recently reopened and currently receives general, project, and containerized cargo.

== Operations ==
The port has 15 berths of which 11 are currently operational with a combined wharf length of 2,000 meters. In 2013 NAWAH opened the only fully containerized terminal at Berth 14.
