= Al Maqal =

Coordinates: 30.55648722°N 47.79026415°E

Al Maqal is a district of Basra, Iraq which lies in the north of the city centre, where the Shatt Al Arab Hotel, and Al-Maqal Port lie.
