= Jalil Hanoon =

Iraqi footballer

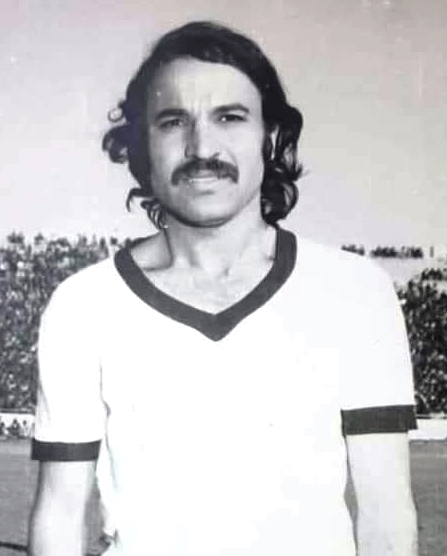

Personal information
- Full name: Jalil Hanoon Matar Al-Asadi
- Date of birth: 1 July 1952 (age 74)
- Place of birth: Basra, Iraq
- Position: Forward

Youth career
- 1968–1973: Al-Mina'a

Senior career*
Years	Team	Apps	(Gls)
1969–1974	Al-Mina'a		
1974–1975	Al-Muwasalat		
1975–1989	Al-Mina'a		
1989–1991	Al-Bahri		

International career
1973–1973	Iraq U21		
1973–1975	Iraq U23		
1973–1980	Iraq	37	(7)

Managerial career
- 1992–1993: Al-Rumaila
- 1993–1998: Al-Minaa U16
- 2003–2004: Al-Minaa (assistant)
- * Club domestic league appearances and goals

Jalil Hanoon Matar Al-Asadi (Arabic: جَلِيل حَنُّون مَطَر الْأَسَدِيّ; born 1952) is an Iraqi former footballer who is the president of Al-Minaa club.

== Sport history ==
Jalil Hanoon played as a forward and spent the majority of his career with Al-Minaa club, He was capped Iraqi League title for Al-Minaa, winning the title of the top scorer 1978, and appeared at the World Military Cup 1977, and scored a goal in Nigeria's nets. He also played matches in Pestabola Merdeka 1977 in Malaysia. Hanoon was highly regarded throughout his the top scorer of the particular model, has scored during him sports-old 271 goals at the level of local matches and 7 goals in 37 international matches. and sports fans were calls him: (Keegan of Iraq). Hanoon is the only scorer for Al-Minaa club in the Iraqi league so far, when he scored 11 goals in the 1977-78 season. He is the only player in the league who scored a hat-trick in the nets of two mass clubs (Al-Tayaran & Al-Zawraa) in the 1983-84 season. He is also the second player who has scored 5 goals in one match in the Iraqi league while shook nets of Al-Hillah in 1977 season. Jalil's brother is athletic too, he is his coach, he's the player and coach Jamil Hanoon, a coach who guided Al-Minaa club to win the league title in 1977-78 season.

== International career ==
On August 21, 1973 Jalil Hanoon played his debut with Iraq against South Yemen in fully international match, in the 2nd edition of Palestine Cup of Nations in Libya, scoring his first goal in this match which ended 2-0 for Iraq.

On March 28, 1980 Jalil Hanoon played his last international match with Iraq against South Yemen too, within qualifier of Moscow Olympics in Baghdad, which ended 3-0 for Iraq.

== International goals ==
Iraq national football team goals
Scores and results list Iraq's goal tally first.

#	Date	Venue	Opponent	Score	Result	Competition
1.	8 December 1973	March 28 Stadium, Benghazi, Libya	South Yemen	2–0	2–0	Palestine Cup of Nations
2.	14 July 1974	Al-Shaab Stadium, Baghdad, Iraq	(Hungary) Honvéd	1–1	2–2	Friendly National vs. Club
3.	14 July 1974	Al-Shaab Stadium, Baghdad, Iraq	(Hungary) Honvéd	2–2	2–2	Friendly National vs. Club
4.	3 September 1974	Azadi Stadium, Tehran, Iran	India	2–0	3–0	Asian Games
5.	27 June 1977	Abbasiyyin Stadium, Damascus, Syria	Nigeria	1–0	1–0	World Military Championship

== Honors ==
=== Local ===
Al-Mina'a

- 1978 Iraqi League: Champion

=== International ===
Iraq

- 1977 World Men's Military Cup: Champion
- 1977 Pestabola Merdeka: runner-up
