= 1977–78 Iraqi National League =

Iraqi National League
- Season: 1977–78
- Champions: Al-Minaa (1st title)
- Relegated: Al-Hilla; Babil
- Top goalscorer: Jalil Hanoon (11 goals)

The 1977–78 Iraqi National Clubs First Division League was the 4th season of the competition since its foundation in 1974. Al-Minaa won their first national league title, winning the competition without defeat and becoming the first team from outside Baghdad to win the national league.

== Name changes ==
- Al-Baladiyat merged with Amanat Al-Asima to form Al-Amana.

== League table ==
Pos	Team	Pld	W	D	L	GF	GA	GD	Pts	Qualification or relegation
1	Al-Minaa	13	8	5	0	27	10	+17	21	League Champions
2	Al-Zawraa	13	9	1	3	31	9	+22	19	
3	Al-Sinaa	13	8	3	2	18	7	+11	19	
4	Al-Jaish	13	9	0	4	16	12	+4	18	
5	Al-Amana	13	7	3	3	14	6	+8	17	
6	Al-Shorta	13	5	7	1	11	5	+6	17	
7	Al-Tayaran	13	5	4	4	19	11	+8	14	FA Cup Winners
8	Al-Jamiea	13	4	6	3	8	10	−2	14	
9	Al-Iktisad	13	4	3	6	13	17	−4	11	
10	Salahaddin	13	2	5	6	10	15	−5	9	
11	Al-Ittihad	13	3	3	7	11	17	−6	9	
12	Al-Thawra	13	3	3	7	9	17	−8	9	
13	Al-Hilla	13	1	2	10	4	30	−26	4	Relegated to Iraqi National Second Division
14	Babil	13	0	1	12	3	28	−25	1	Relegated to Iraqi National Second Division

Source: Ali Al-Sabti Archive

== Results ==
Home \ Away	AMN	HLL	IKT	ITT	JSH	MIN	SHR	SIN	TLB	TAY	THW	ZWR	BBL	SAL
Al-Amana		2–0		2–0	3–0			0–1					3–0	1–0
Al-Hilla								0–4					1–0	
Al-Iktisad	1–1	3–1									1–0		1–0	
Al-Ittihad		1–1	2–1										2–1	
Al-Jaish		1–0	0–2	3–2		0–1		1–0	2–0	1–0	1–0		3–1	3–1
Al-Minaa	2–0	5–1	1–0	1–0			1–0	1–1			1–1	3–2	6–0	2–2
Al-Shorta	0–0	1–0	2–2	2–0	2–0			1–1	1–1		0–0		1–0	1–0
Al-Sinaa			0–0	1–0					2–0	2–1	3–0		1–0	2–1
Al-Jamiea	0–0	1–0	1–0	0–0		1–1					2–0		1–0	0–0
Al-Tayaran	2–0	5–0	1–0	0–1		2–2	0–0		1–1		0–0			4–2
Al-Thawra	0–1	3–0		2–1										
Al-Zawraa	0–1	4–0	6–2	2–1	0–1		0–0	2–0	3–0	2–1	5–0		4–0	1–0
Babil										0–2	1–3			0–0
Salahaddin		0–0	2–0	1–1							1–0			

Source: Ali Al-Sabti Archive
Legend: Blue = home team win; Yellow = draw; Red = away team win.

== Season statistics ==
=== Top scorers ===
Pos	Scorer	Goals	Team
1	Jalil Hanoon	11	Al-Minaa
2	Falah Hassan	10	Al-Zawraa
3	Salim Malakh	8	Al-Tayaran
4	Hassan Saddawi	7	Al-Jaish
5	Hazem Jassam	6	Al-Zawraa

=== Hat-tricks ===
Player	For	Against	Result	Date
(Iraq) Hassan Saddawi	Al-Jaish	Salahaddin	3–1	25 October 1977
(Iraq) Mahdi Jassim	Al-Zawraa	Babil	4–0	3 November 1977
(Iraq) Salim Malakh	Al-Tayaran	Salahaddin	4–2	14 November 1977
(Iraq) Jalil Hanoon^{4}	Al-Minaa	Babil	6–0	27 January 1978
(Iraq) Falah Hassan	Al-Zawraa	Al-Hilla	4–0	27 January 1978

Notes

^{4} Player scored 4 goals
