= Iraq national football team =

Men's association football team

Iraq
- Nickname(s): أسود الرافدين, Usūd al-Rāfidayn (Lions of Mesopotamia)
- Association: Iraq Football Association (IFA)
- Confederation: AFC (Asia)
- Sub-confederation: WAFF (West Asia)
- Head coach: Graham Arnold
- Captain: Aymen Hussein
- Most caps: Younis Mahmoud (148)
- Top scorer: Hussein Saeed (78)
- Home stadium: Basra International Stadium
- FIFA code: IRQ
First colours	Second colours	Third colours

FIFA ranking
- Current: 62 ▲1 (18 November 2026)
- Highest: 39 (6 October 2004)
- Lowest: 139 (3 July 1996)

First international
- Morocco 3–3 Iraq (Beirut, Lebanon; 19 October 1957)

Biggest win
- Iraq 13–0 Ethiopia (Irbid, Jordan; 18 August 1992)

Biggest defeat
- Turkey 7–1 Iraq (Adana, Turkey; 6 December 1959); Brazil 6–0 Iraq (Malmö, Sweden; 11 October 2012); Chile 6–0 Iraq (Copenhagen, Denmark; 14 August 2013)

World Cup
- Appearances: 2 (first in 1986)
- Best result: Group stage (1986, 2026)

Asian Cup
- Appearances: 11 (first in 1972)
- Best result: Champions (2007)

Arab Cup
- Appearances: 7 (first in 1964)
- Best result: Champions (1964, 1966, 1985, 1988)

WAFF Championship
- Appearances: 9 (first in 2000)
- Best result: Champions (2002)

Arabian Gulf Cup
- Appearances: 18 (first in 1976)
- Best result: Champions (1979, 1984, 1988, 2023)

Confederations Cup
- Appearances: 1 (first in 2009)
- Best result: Group stage (2009)
Medal record
AFC Asian Cup
Gold medal – first place	2007 Indonesia, Malaysia, Thailand and Vietnam	Team
Asian Games
Gold medal – first place	1982 New Delhi	Team
WAFF Championship
Gold medal – first place	2002 Syria	Team
Silver medal – second place	2007 Jordan	Team
Silver medal – second place	2012 Kuwait	Team
Silver medal – second place	2019 Iraq	Team
Bronze medal – third place	2000 Jordan	Team
Arab Cup
Gold medal – first place	1964 Kuwait	Team
Gold medal – first place	1966 Iraq	Team
Gold medal – first place	1985 Saudi Arabia	Team
Gold medal – first place	1988 Jordan	Team
Bronze medal – third place	2012 Saudi Arabia	Team
Arabian Gulf Cup
Gold medal – first place	1979 Iraq	Team
Gold medal – first place	1984 Oman	Team
Gold medal – first place	1988 Saudi Arabia	Team
Gold medal – first place	2023 Iraq	Team
Silver medal – second place	1976 Qatar	Team
Silver medal – second place	2013 Bahrain	Team
West Asian Games
Gold medal – first place	2005 Doha	Team
Arab Games
Gold medal – first place	1985 Rabat	Team
Silver medal – second place	1999 Amman	Team

The Iraq national football team (Arabic: منتخب العراق لكرة القدم), nicknamed the Lions of Mesopotamia (Arabic: أسود الرافدين), represents Iraq in men's international football and is controlled by the Iraq Football Association (IFA), the governing body for football in Iraq. Iraq's usual home venue is the Basra International Stadium.

Iraq has qualified for the FIFA World Cup on two occasions, in 1986 and 2026, exiting at the group stage both times. Iraq scored its first World Cup goal against Belgium in 1986 and added a second against Norway in 2026. Iraq is one of eight AFC nations to have won the AFC Asian Cup, claiming the title in 2007 in spite of difficult conditions and limited preparation. Iraq defeated some of the favourites in the competition including Australia, South Korea and Saudi Arabia. Iraq went on to earn two points at the 2009 FIFA Confederations Cup and finish fourth at the 2015 AFC Asian Cup.

At the regional level, Iraq is the Arab Cup's most successful nation with four titles and has also won the Arabian Gulf Cup four times and the WAFF Championship once. Iraq is known for its passionate football fans and the national team is seen as a symbol of hope and unity for Iraqi people. The team reached its highest FIFA World Ranking of 39th in October 2004.

== History ==
=== Early years and regional success (1948–1979) ===
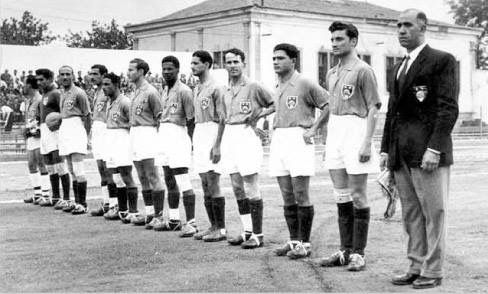
The Iraqi national football team in 1951; they played friendly games in the Turkish cities of İzmir and Ankara.

On 8 October 1948, the Iraq Football Association was founded. The Iraq FA joined FIFA in 1950 and in April 1951, Iraq played their first match: a 5–0 win over the Civil Cantonment (C.C.) team of Habbaniyah. Iraq's first ever official international game came in the opening game of the 1957 Arab Games in Beirut where Iraq drew 3–3 to Morocco with goals from Ammo Baba, Youra Eshaya (both from Iraq's Assyrian minority) and Fakhri Mohammed Salman. One of the members of Iraq's first national team was Youra Eshaya, who in 1954 became the first Iraqi footballer to play in England for Bristol Rovers Colts.

In 1962, Iraq appointed their first foreign manager, Romanian coach Cornel Drăgușin. Iraq won their first trophy in 1964 when they won the Arab Cup, winning three and drawing one of their four games. In the following edition, they retained their Arab Cup title, beating Syria 2–1 in the final in Baghdad.

In 1972, Iraq played at their first ever AFC Asian Cup but failed to win a game in the tournament. In March 1973, Iraq played their first ever FIFA World Cup qualifying campaign. They finished second in their group, a point behind Australia, therefore failing to qualify for the next round. In the remaining years of the 1970s, Iraq reached the second round of the Asian Games (1974), lost the Arabian Gulf Cup final (1976), finished fourth at the AFC Asian Cup (1976), finished fourth in the Asian Games (1978) and finally hosted and won the Arabian Gulf Cup (1979). The 1976 Asian Cup would be the last Asian Cup that Iraq appeared in for the next 20 years, as they withdrew from the next three editions.

=== 1980s – First Golden Generation ===
The 1980s was arguably Iraq's most successful period in their history. They started the decade off disappointingly, being knocked out in the first round of qualifiers for the 1982 FIFA World Cup. In 1982, they won the gold medal at the 1982 Asian Games. In 1984, Iraq won the Arabian Gulf Cup. The following year, they won the 1985 Arab Cup and also won the gold medal at the 1985 Arab Games.

==== 1986 FIFA World Cup: Iraq’s historic first qualification ====
Iraq were seeded into the first round of qualifiers where they faced Qatar and Jordan. Iraq topped Group 1B with 6 points, and advanced to the second round. Iraq faced United Arab Emirates in two legs. Iraq defeated UAE 3–2 in Dubai. Iraq lost 2–1 to UAE in the second leg. Iraq progressed on away goals after a 4–4 aggregate scoreline and advanced to the final round. In the final round, Iraq drew 0–0 against Syria in Damascus. Iraq defeated Syria 3–1 in the second leg in Taif. Iraq won 3–1 on aggregate and qualified for the 1986 FIFA World Cup.

At their first game of the Group B at the 1986 FIFA World Cup, Iraq played well against Paraguay, losing narrowly 1–0 despite scoring a goal that was controversially disallowed by the referee. Iraq recorded their first World Cup goal in the second game, scoring against Belgium in a 1–2 defeat despite having ten men, with Ahmed Radhi scoring a goal for Iraq. Iraq played against hosts Mexico in the third game, losing 1–0 and being eliminated from the World Cup.

In the following years, Iraq won the 1988 Arabian Gulf Cup and won the 1988 Arab Cup. Overall, Iraq won nine competitions in the 1980s and played in their first World Cup, leading many to believe that this was the golden era of Iraqi football. In 1989, Iraq competed in qualifying for a berth in the 1990 World Cup finals, but they lost a crucial game against Qatar.

=== 1990s – The Dark Era ===
Following the Gulf War in 1990, Iraq was banned from participating in the Asian Games and in most Arab competitions. The ban was not extended to the World Cup.

==== 1994 FIFA World Cup qualification: The Agony of Doha ====
In 1993, Iraq participated in qualifiers for the 1994 FIFA World Cup. Grouped with China, Yemen, Jordan and Pakistan in the first stage, Iraq proved to be too strong for the rest, with the team only failing to win twice, a draw to Jordan and loss to China.

In the final round, Iraq was grouped with Saudi Arabia, South Korea, Japan, Iran and North Korea. On the first matchday, Iraq lost 3–2 to North Korea in a dramatic way, being 2–0 ahead in the second half. After an Iraqi player was sent off, North Korea pulled back in the 67th minute, equalized in the 77th minute and scored the winner in the 82nd minute. Iraq then tied 2–2 with South Korea. and then defeated Iran 2–1 by goals of Ahmed Radhi and Alaa Kadhim.

Iraq missed out on a World Cup spot by two points. By drawing their last game with Japan 2–2, they denied the Japanese a place in the finals in a match referred to by the Japanese media as the Agony of Doha. The loss against North Korea proved to be the difference with the other teams, as North Korea lost their other 4 matches and finished bottom of the group.

==== 1996 AFC Asian Cup: Return after two decades ====
Iraq participated in the 1996 AFC Asian Cup, their first Asian Cup campaign for 20 years after being banned in 1992 and withdrawing from the three tournaments before that. They reached the quarter-finals but lost to the United Arab Emirates due to a golden goal scored by Abdulrahman Ibrahim. In 1996, Iraq was ranked 139th in the world, which is their worst FIFA ranking in their history due to inactivity after withdrawing from several tournaments.

In 1997, Iraq participated in qualifiers for the 1998 FIFA World Cup but were knocked out at the first round following two defeats by Kazakhstan.

This period is known as 'The Dark Era' as Uday Hussein, the son of Saddam Hussein and then-president of IFA, abused his control of Iraqi football and tortured players who played poorly, punishing them by sending them to prison, making them bathe in raw sewage and kick concrete balls, and shaving their heads among many other punishments.

=== 2000s – Second Golden Generation ===
The 2000s was considered to be the rebirth of a new Iraqi football golden generation. However, Iraq had a rocky beginning. Iraq played in the 2000 AFC Asian Cup but were knocked out at the quarter-final stage again, this time by Japan in a 4–1 loss. Iraq reached the final round of 2002 FIFA World Cup qualification for the first time since 1994 but lost five of their eight second-round games and therefore failed to make the finals. Iraq won their first ever WAFF Championship in 2002, beating Jordan 3–2 in the final after extra time.

In the 2004 AFC Asian Cup, Iraq lost the opening match against Uzbekistan, then they won against Turkmenistan and Saudi Arabia respectively, to reach the quarter-finals before getting knocked out by China. In the same year they were knocked out at the second round of 2006 FIFA World Cup qualifiers by Uzbekistan.

Iraq were ranked as high as 39th in the World Rankings in October 2004 which is their highest ranking position in their history. The following year, Iraq won the gold medal in the West Asian Games by beating Syria in the final via a penalty shootout. In 2007, Iraq were knocked out at the group stage of the Arabian Gulf Cup after a controversial defeat to Saudi Arabia. Akram Salman was sacked and Jorvan Vieira appointed as head coach. Under him, Iraq reached the final of the WAFF Championship but lost 2–1 to Iran.

==== 2007 AFC Asian Cup: Iraq's famous first continental title ====
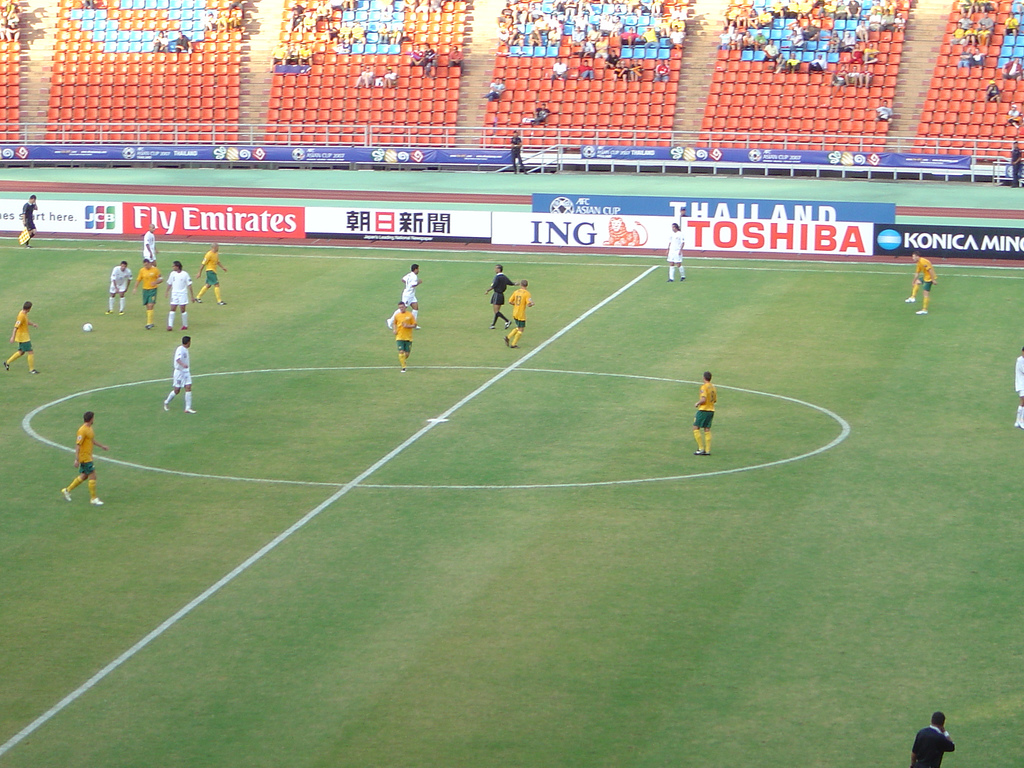
Iraq playing against Australia in Group A of the 2007 AFC Asian Cup; Iraq won the game 3–1 on their way to winning the cup.

In July 2007, Iraq kicked off their 2007 AFC Asian Cup campaign. The squad was made mainly of players that won the 2000 AFC Youth Championship, finished fourth at the 2004 Olympic Games and second at the 2006 Asian Games. Vieira only had two months to prepare his team for the tournament, and the team suffered from very poor facilities. The Iraq FA struggled to provide the team with enough kits for the tournament and Iraq had not been able to play any previous games in their own country for security reasons and most of the players had had family members killed in the war.

The team started the tournament with a 1–1 draw against joint-hosts Thailand before producing a 3–1 win over favourites Australia. A draw with Oman followed to put Iraq into the quarter-finals where two goals from Younis Mahmoud against Vietnam put Iraq into the semi-finals for the second time in their history. They managed to knock out one of the best Asian teams, South Korea in the semis via a penalty shootout in which Noor Sabri made a crucial save. After the game, a suicide bomber killed 30 football fans who were celebrating the semi-final win over South Korea and this almost led to the Iraqi team withdrawing from the final, but they decided to go on in honour of the dead and succeeded in doing that after defeating Saudi Arabia 1–0 in the final, a game that they dominated from start to finish and that was won by a Younis Mahmoud header. This tournament win is seen as one of the greatest upsets in international history as a war-torn country became international champions in what is described as one of sport's greatest 'fairytales'.

Vieira stated during the final that he would resign after the Asian Cup. He was replaced by Egil Olsen in September 2007.

==== 2010 FIFA World Cup qualification: Controversial early exit ====
Under Egil Olsen, Iraq advanced from the first round by beating Pakistan 7–0 on aggregate. Then they were drawn with Australia, China, and Qatar for the second round. On the first matchday, Iraq tied China. As a consequence, Olsen was sacked and replaced by Adnan Hamad. The next two matches saw Iraq lose twice to Qatar and Australia. However, Iraq bounced back with a 1–0 win over Australia and 2–1 win against China.

On 26 May 2008, FIFA decided to suspend Iraq from all international competitions after the Iraq Football Association was disbanded by the government on 20 May 2008. The suspension was provisionally and conditionally lifted on 29 May 2008. Iraq needed 1 point to advance to the final stage on the last matchday, but failed to advance to the final round of 2010 FIFA World Cup qualifiers as a 1–0 defeat to Qatar saw them finish in third in the group. Following this, the Iraq FA decided to disband the team and sacked Hamad.

Qatar fielded ineligible player Emerson in the 2–0 defeat to Iraq on 26 March 2008, prompting FIFA to controversially suspend him but clear Qatar of any wrongdoing, in direct contradiction to its decisions against Singapore. Iraq appealed the decision to the Court of Arbitration for Sport but it was rejected by the CAS, saying that Iraq submitted documents and appeal fees too late.

Jorvan Vieira was reappointed in September 2008. After a disappointing 2009 Arabian Gulf Cup, Vieira was sacked and replaced by Bora Milutinovic.

==== 2009 FIFA Confederations Cup: Iraq on the global stage ====
In 2009, Iraq participated in only their second FIFA tournament ever: the 2009 FIFA Confederations Cup, which they qualified for by winning the 2007 AFC Asian Cup. They started the tournament with a 0–0 draw with hosts South Africa, before losing 1–0 to UEFA Euro 2008 winners Spain. Iraq drew the last game 0–0 with New Zealand and were knocked out.

On 20 November 2009, the FIFA Emergency Committee suspended the Iraq FA due to government interference; the suspension was lifted on 19 March 2010.

=== 2010s – Ups and downs ===
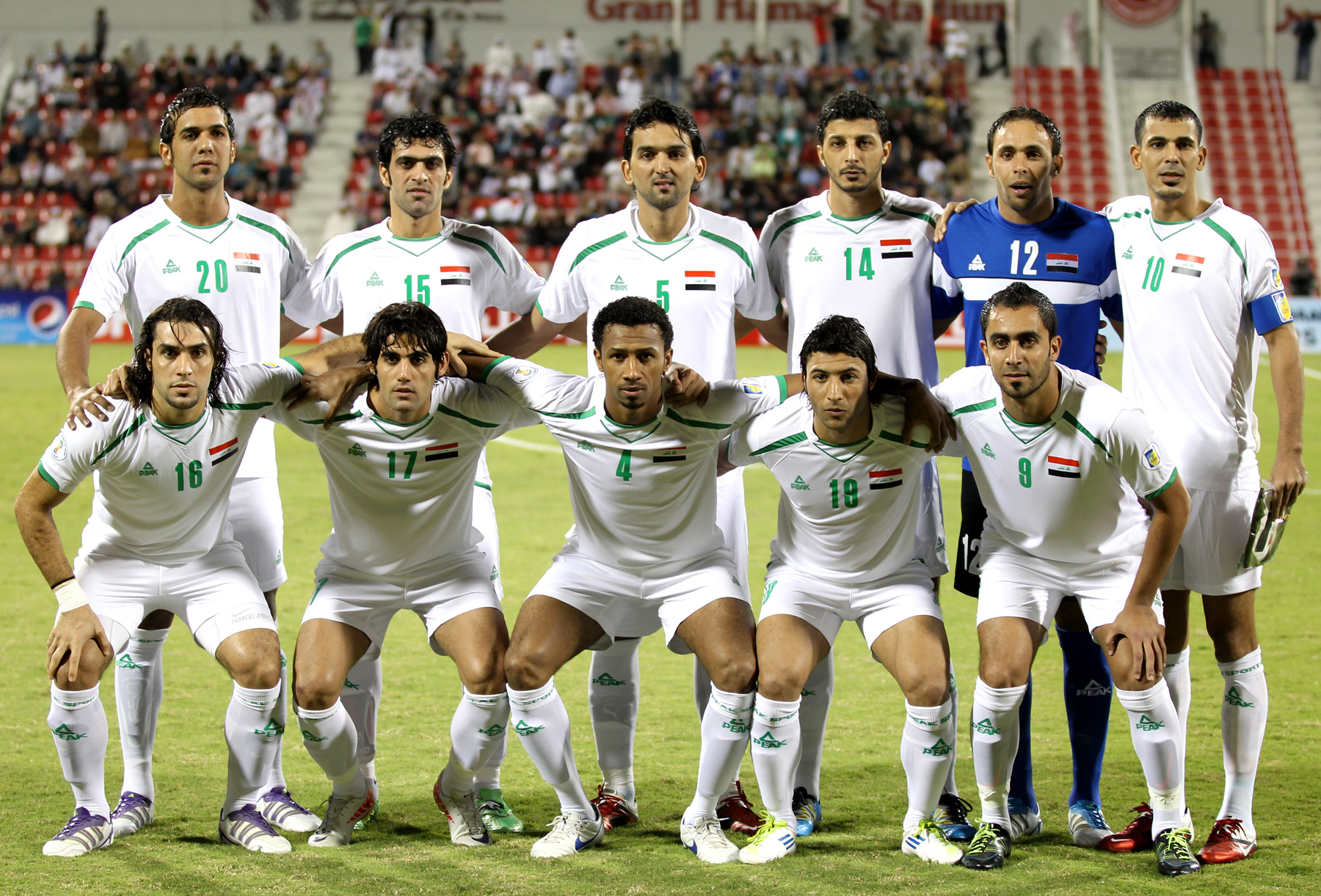
The Iraqi national team pose ahead of their 2014 FIFA World Cup qualification match against China in Doha.

Iraq qualified automatically for the 2011 AFC Asian Cup, where they were drawn with Iran, North Korea and UAE. After losing 2–1 to Iran and beating UAE 1–0, Iraq defeated North Korea 1–0 to advance to the quarterfinals. They lost 1–0 to Australia after extra time, with Harry Kewell scoring in the 117th minute.

Under Wolfgang Sidka, Iraq entered the 2014 FIFA World Cup qualifiers, defeating Yemen 2–0 and drawing 0–0 to advance. Sidka left in August 2011 and was replaced by Brazilian legend Zico. On 29 August 2011, Brazilian legend Zico signed a one-year contract to become the new coach of Iraq.

Iraq topped their third-round group with 15 points, but struggled in the final round against Jordan, Japan, Australia and Oman. After two opening draws, Iraq lost to Japan and Australia before beating Jordan 1–0 in Doha. Zico resigned in November 2012 and was replaced by Vladimir Petrović in February 2013. Iraq were eliminated after losing 1–0 to Japan on 11 June 2013.

==== 2015 AFC Asian Cup: Iraq's run to the semi-finals ====
Iraq were in a 2015 AFC Asian Cup qualifying group alongside Saudi Arabia, China and Indonesia. After losing consecutively against China and Saudi Arabia, Iraq was in danger of missing out on the Asian Cup. They kept alive their hopes of qualifying for the 2015 AFC Asian Cup with a 2–0 away win over Indonesia on 19 November 2013, and on the last matchday, Iraq booked their spot with a commanding 3–1 win at the Sharjah Stadium against China. Due to bad results at the 22nd Arabian Gulf Cup, Hakeem Shaker was sacked and the FA appointed Radhi Shenaishil as caretaker coach.

Iraq began the 2015 AFC Asian Cup campaign with a 1–0 win over Jordan. In the next match, Iraq faced Japan and lost the match 0–1. Iraq then beat Palestine 2–0 and qualified to knockout stage as the Group D runner-up. Iraq defeated Iran in the quarter-finals in penalties, 7–6, after the game ended 3–3 after 120 minutes of play. They faced South Korea in the semi-finals but lost 0–2. Iraq finished the AFC Asian Cup in fourth place, after losing 2–3 to United Arab Emirates in third/fourth place play-off.

==== 2018 FIFA World Cup qualification: Struggles in the final round ====
For the 2018 FIFA World Cup qualifiers, Iraq were drawn with Thailand, Vietnam and Chinese Taipei.

In August 2015, Yahya Alwan was appointed coach for the 2018 FIFA World Cup qualifiers. After initially starting well with a 5–1 win against Chinese Taipei, two consecutive draws against Thailand and Vietnam left Iraq in real danger of missing out on the final round. On 24 March 2016, Iraq tied 2–2 with Thailand and Alwan was replaced with Abdul-Ghani Shahad. Five days later, he led Iraq to the final round and 2019 AFC Asian Cup by beating Vietnam 1–0.

On 15 April 2016, Radhi Shenaishil became the new coach of Iraq in order to lead the team in the final round. For the final round, Iraq was drawn with Japan, Australia, Saudi Arabia, UAE, and Thailand. After seven matchdays, Iraq only managed to collect four points by beating Thailand 4–0 and drawing 1–1 with Australia. As a result, Shenaishil was sacked on April 10, 2017.

Basim Qasim was appointed for the remainder of the qualifiers and Iraq finished fifth in their group in the final round of the 2018 FIFA World Cup qualification.

==== 2019 AFC Asian Cup: Defeat to the eventual champions ====
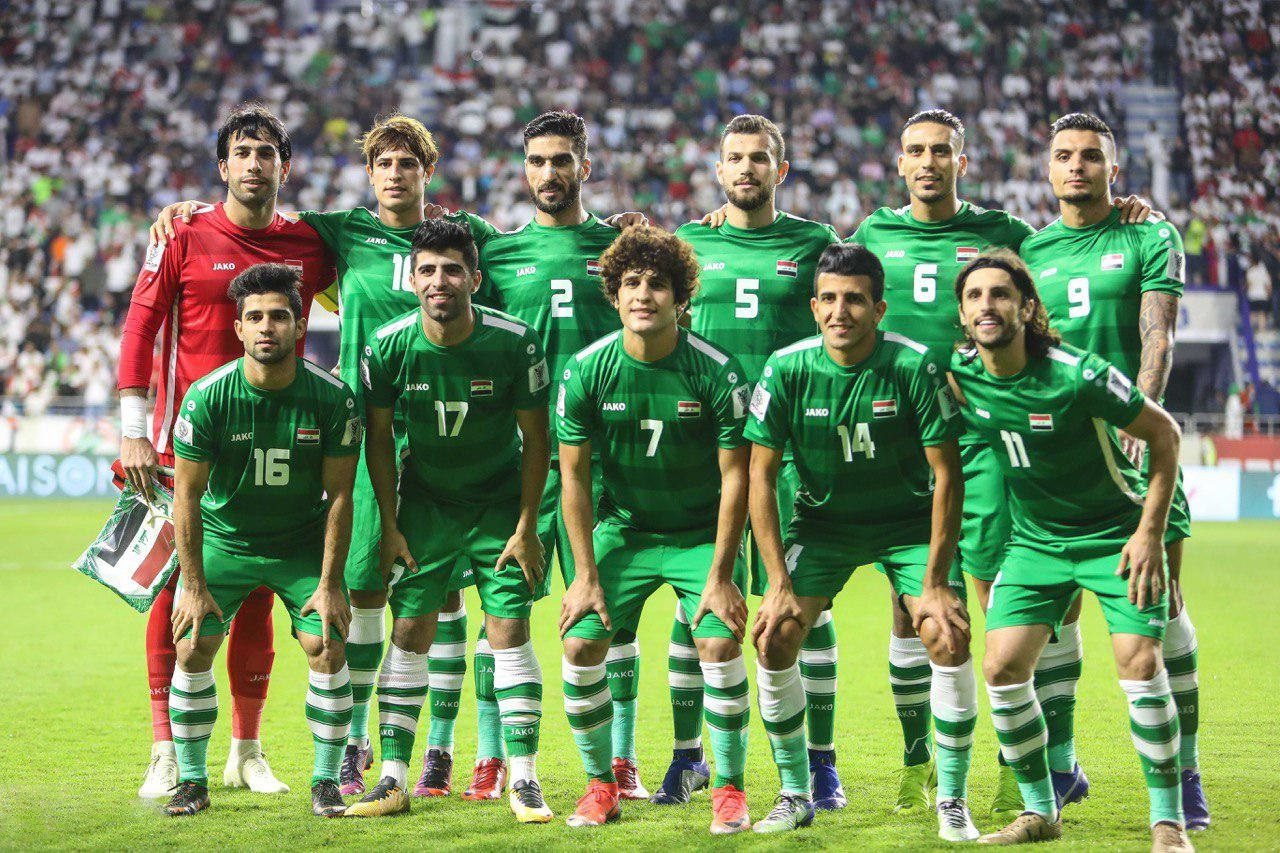
The Iraqi national team pose ahead of their 2019 AFC Asian Cup match against Iran in Dubai.

The 2019 AFC Asian Cup draw put Iraq in Group D, with Iran, Vietnam, and Yemen.

On 3 September 2018, Srečko Katanec was appointed as head coach on a three-year contract to lead Iraq in the 2019 AFC Asian Cup and 2022 FIFA World Cup qualification.

Their first match took place on 8 January 2019 against Vietnam and ended in a 3–2 victory for Iraq. Their second match against Yemen on January 12 ended in a 3–0 victory, with goals coming from Mohanad Ali, Bashar Resan, and Alaa Abbas. In their final group game, Iraq faced Iran on January 16, resulting in a 0–0 draw. With these performances, Iraq finished second in Group D and advanced to the knockout stage.

In the Round of 16, Iraq faced Qatar. Despite their efforts, Iraq suffered a 1–0 defeat, with Bassam Al-Rawi scoring the only goal, ending their journey in the tournament. Qatar later won the tournament.

=== 2020s – Recent history ===
Iraq participated in the second round of the Asian qualifiers for the 2022 FIFA World Cup. They were placed in Group C alongside Bahrain, Iran, Cambodia, and Hong Kong and reached the final round with five wins from eight matches including a 2–1 victory against Iran.

Iraq went 19 consecutive matches without losing between 2019 and 2021 and moved up from 89th to 68th in the FIFA rankings during Katanec's tenure. Katanec departed in July 2021 after six months of unpaid wages and filed a complaint with FIFA.

On 31 July 2021, Dutchman Dick Advocaat was appointed head coach of Iraq. Under Advocaat, Iraq made to a slow start to the final round of World Cup Qualifiers, drawing four games and losing two, and on 21 November 2021, Advocaat resigned. Željko Petrović took charge of the team for the 2021 FIFA Arab Cup, where Iraq were eliminated from the group stage. Petrović was sacked after two further winless qualifying games and Abdul-Ghani Shahad was appointed as an interim manager, but Iraq were eliminated after finishing fourth in the group.

On 7 November 2022, Jesús Casas was appointed head coach of the Iraq national football team, with a contract running until the 2026 FIFA World Cup. In his first tournament in charge, Iraq hosted and won the 25th Arabian Gulf Cup, defeating Oman 3–2 after extra time in the final.

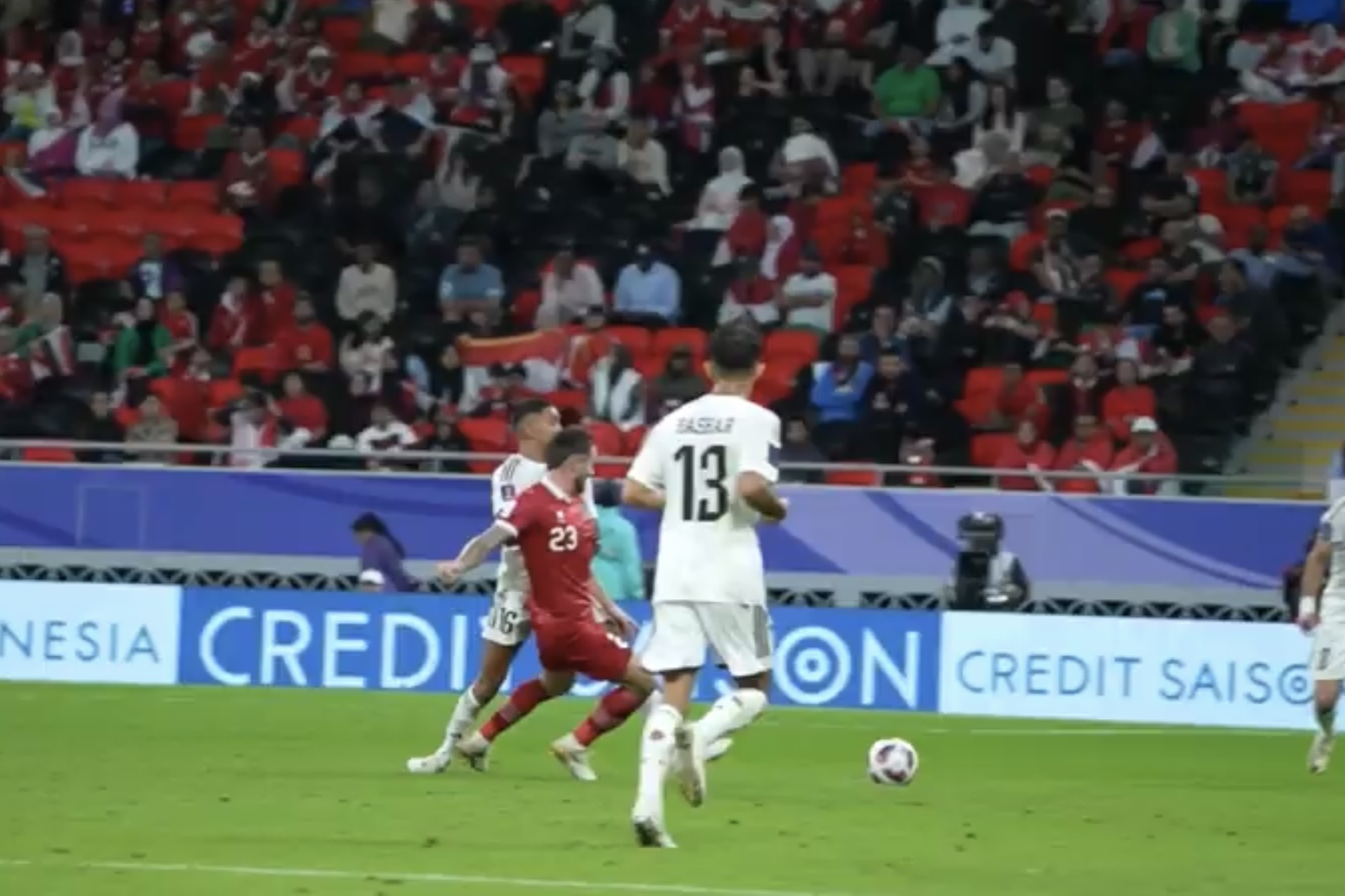
Amir Al-Ammari challenges for the ball in a 2023 AFC Asian Cup match which Iraq won 3–1 against Indonesia.

Iraq was drawn in Group D of the 2023 AFC Asian Cup with Japan, Vietnam, and Indonesia. On 15 January 2024, Iraq overcame Indonesia 3–1. Four days later, Iraq created the biggest shock in the tournament, stunning Japan (who had been undefeated in the last 11 matches) by beating them 2–1 in the second group match to ensure first place in the group; both Iraq goals were scored by Aymen Hussein. With the outcome confirmed, Iraq largely rotated their squad on the final match against Vietnam, and ended up triumphant 3–2 to make history by earning a perfect record of nine points. However, Iraq suffered a shock defeat in the Round of 16, losing 2–3 to Jordan to exit the tournament. The result was controversial due to a second yellow card shown to Aymen Hussein by the referee for his celebration after he had scored to take a 2–1 lead.

==== 2026 FIFA World Cup: Return to the World Cup after forty years ====
During the second round of World Cup qualification, Iraq was placed in Group F alongside Vietnam, the Philippines, and Indonesia. The team had an impressive run, winning all six matches, securing qualification to the next round and for the 2027 AFC Asian Cup. In the third round of qualification, Iraq was drawn into Group B, which included South Korea, Jordan, Palestine, Oman, and Kuwait. However, despite early momentum, Iraq struggled to maintain consistency. Following a 2–1 defeat to Palestine on 27 March 2025, the Iraq Football Association (IFA) held an urgent meeting and unanimously decided to dismiss Casas and his coaching staff. His contract was officially terminated on 15 April 2025.

Casas was succeeded by Australian coach Graham Arnold, who previously coached Australia in the 2022 FIFA World Cup. Arnold took over for the final matches of the third round, but Iraq finished third in the group and missed out on direct qualification to the World Cup, instead proceeding to the fourth round of qualifiers. In the fourth round, Iraq were drawn with hosts Saudi Arabia and Indonesia. Iraq ended Indonesia's hope of qualification with a 1–0 victory, however Iraq finished as group runners-up after a goalless draw with Saudi Arabia, who qualified to the World Cup on goals scored. Iraq advanced to the two-legged fifth round playoff against the United Arab Emirates; in the first leg in Abu Dhabi, the teams drew 1–1. In the return leg in Basra, Iraq triumphed 2–1, winning the tie 3–2 on aggregate, thanks to a dramatic stoppage-time penalty converted by Amir Al-Ammari. With that victory, Iraq advanced to the inter-confederation play-offs, where they were drawn to face the winner of the game between Bolivia and Suriname in a play-off match held in Mexico to qualify for the 2026 FIFA World Cup. Iraq ultimately faced Bolivia and defeated them 2–1, with Aymen Hussein scoring the decisive goal to secure Iraq's place at the World Cup. Iraq's successful qualifying campaign for the 2026 FIFA World Cup spanned 21 matches over a period of 28 months.

At the 2026 FIFA World Cup, Iraq was drawn into Group I alongside France, Norway and Senegal. Iraq opened its campaign with a 4–1 defeat to Norway, despite Aymen Hussein scoring Iraq's first World Cup goal since 1986 with a headed equaliser, followed by a 3–0 defeat to France. Two costly defensive errors proved decisive in both games, while Iraq's tournament ended with a 5–0 loss to Senegal after receiving an early red card in the match. The Lions of Mesopotamia finished bottom of the group without a point, although their return to the World Cup after a 40-year absence was widely regarded as an important milestone in the national team's development.

== Team image ==
=== Colours ===
The traditional colours of the Iraq national football team are green, white and black. Green and white are often interchangeable as Iraq's home and away colours, while black is used as the third colour.

The national team frequently wore white kits during the 1960s and early 1970s, including at the 1966 Arab Cup and during early FIFA World Cup qualifying campaigns. Green became increasingly prominent from the mid-1970s onward, notably during the 4th Arabian Gulf Cup and the 1976 AFC Asian Cup. Over time, it developed into the team's primary football colour and was often combined with white details inspired by the national flag. The shade of green has varied across different periods, ranging from brighter tones in earlier decades to darker modern interpretations introduced by manufacturers such as Adidas and Umbro.

Iraq have also previously worn red, yellow and blue kits. One of the most notable departures from the traditional colour scheme occurred during the 1986 FIFA World Cup, when Iraq wore yellow against Paraguay and blue against Belgium and Mexico despite having mainly used green and white during qualification. Former Iraqi players later stated that members of the team delegation had attempted to retain the traditional colours, but the request was rejected by then-Iraq Football Association president Uday Hussein, who reportedly insisted on using yellow and blue kits. Following the tournament, Iraq gradually returned to green-and-white combinations.

Since the 2000s, green and white have again formed the basis of Iraq's visual identity, while black has increasingly been used for alternative kits, particularly in designs incorporating references to Mesopotamian civilisation, Babylonian ornamentation and traditional Iraqi motifs. One of the most notable examples was Umbro’s black third kit introduced in November 2021 for the 2021 FIFA Arab Cup, which featured geometric patterns inspired by Mesopotamian art, including Babylonian palm motifs symbolising victory, ornamental Assyrian flowers and decorative elements referencing the walls of the Ishtar Gate. The shirt also incorporated the word “Iraq” in Kufic script on the back and later received international attention among football shirt collectors, including a nomination by Classic Football Shirts among the best football shirts of the year.

=== Kits ===
Iraq's kits have been manufactured by several international and regional sportswear brands, including Umbro, Adidas, Puma, Jako, Peak, Givova, Lotto, Diadora and Jack & Jones. The current kit supplier is Jako.

==== Kit suppliers ====
Kit supplier	Period
Umbro	1984–1986, 2007, 2020–2022
Adidas	1986–1994, 2007, 2014, 2024
Puma	1996
Patrick	2000
Jako	2003–2004, 2014–2019, 2022–2023, 2024–present
Jack & Jones	2004–2006
Diadora	2006
Lotto	2006
Peak	2008–2014
Givova	2019–2020

=== Nickname ===
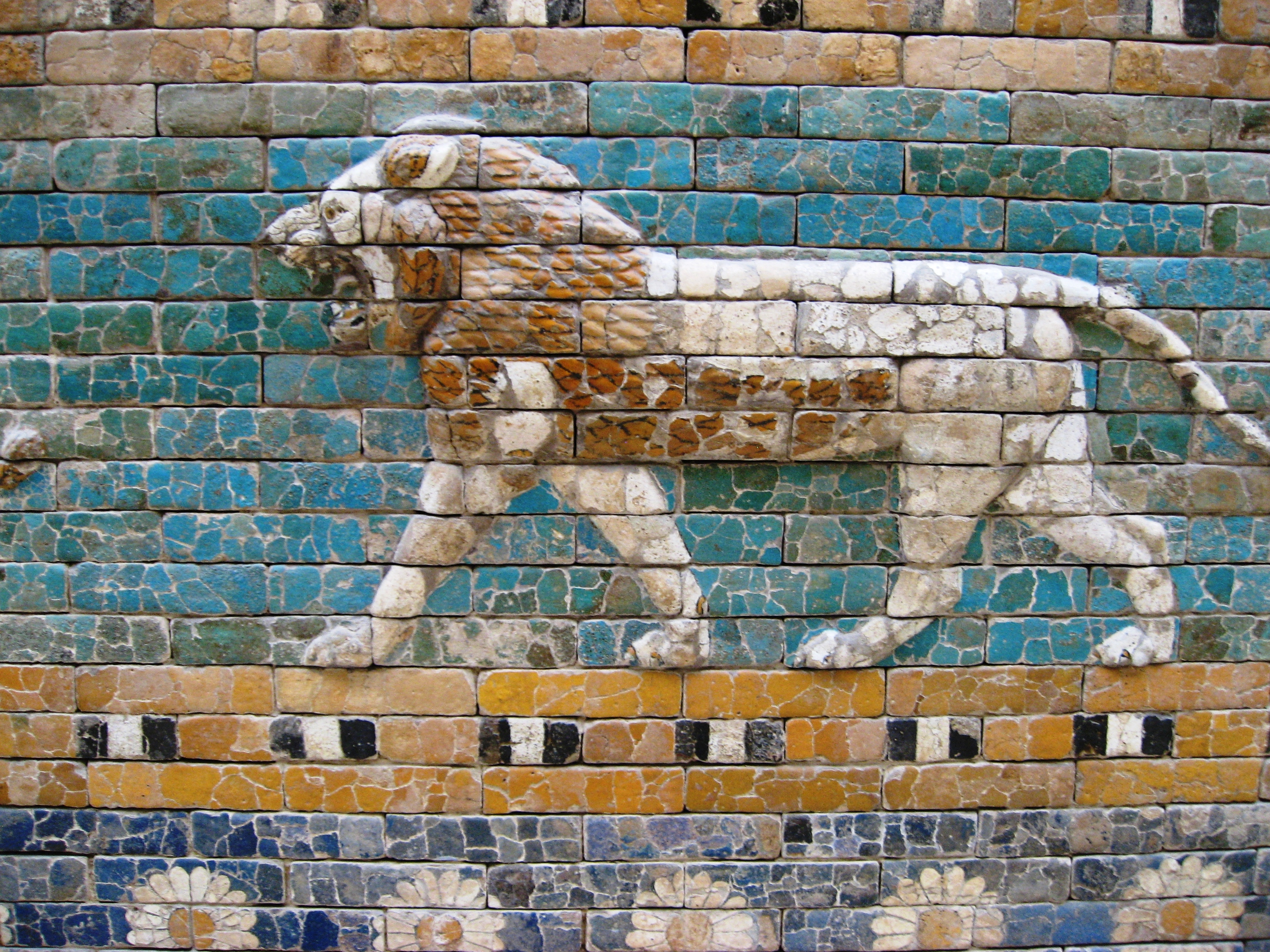
Lion in ceramic tile from the Ishtar Gate in Babylon

The Iraqi team is commonly known as Usūd al-Rāfidayn (Arabic: أسود الرافدين), meaning "Lions of Mesopotamia". In ancient Mesopotamia, the Babylonian lion was a symbol of power, impetuosity, ferocity, prestige and dominance. This is reflected in the sculpted lions in Babylon, where the processional path is ornamented with ceramic tile bas-reliefs representing a prestigious lion from the time of Nebuchadnezzar II. This kind of representation aimed to glorify the king, master of the beasts, and also represent the defeat of the enemy. Moreover, the Mesopotamian royal inscriptions depict the king as a ferocious lion to whom nothing can be resisted. The presence of lions in ancient Iraqi civilization was based on the belief, or desire, that the animals represented would bring with them the virtues they symbolized, so that they could be transmitted to the owners.

=== Team logo ===
Iraq kits throughout history have usually featured the flag of Iraq on them, although the coat of arms of Iraq and the Iraq Football Association logo have both appeared on kits in the past. The national team has occasionally had its own unique logo, the first of which was from 1982 to 1983. This logo was based on the Iraq flag, with Iraqi written at the top of the crest. From 2000 to 2002, the national team's logo featured a green outline with the word Iraq written at the top in green Arabic text. In the 2005 West Asian Games, the team wore a new logo with the red band of the flag appearing in a large semi-circle shape, and in 2007, Iraq briefly reverted to using the logo that they had used from 2000 to 2002. On 23 October 2020, the national team's current logo was revealed. A star featured above the crest on the national team's shirts from 2021 to 2022 to commemorate the nation's 2007 AFC Asian Cup victory.

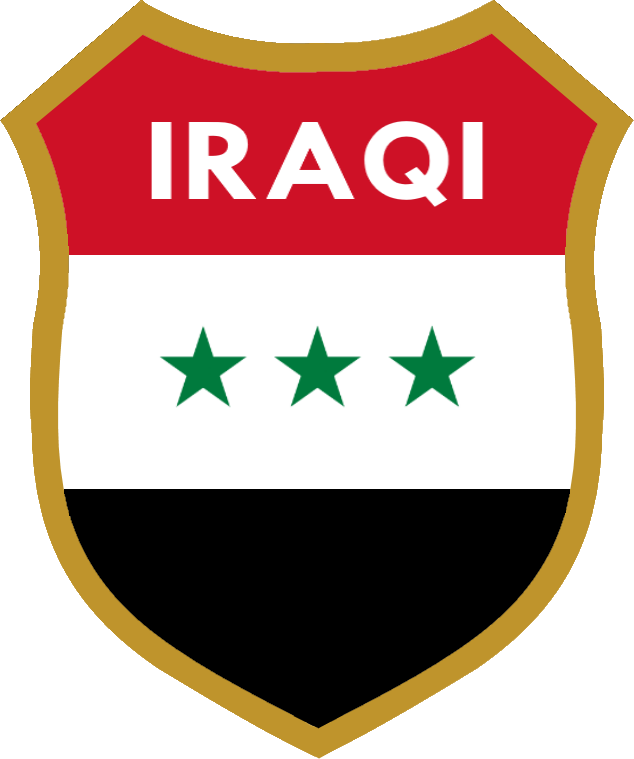
1982–1983

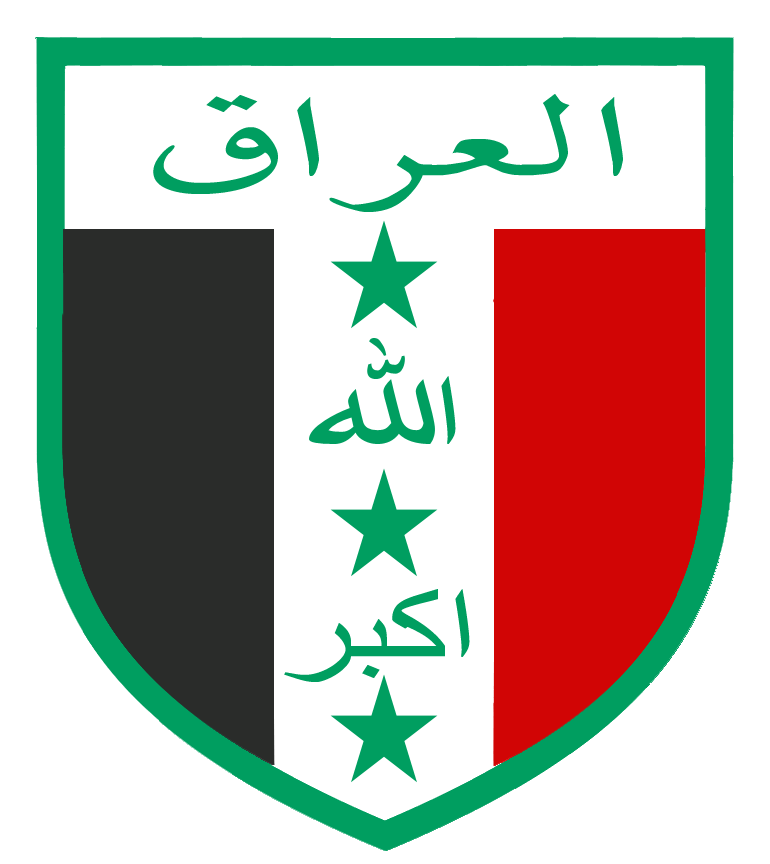
2000–2002,
2007

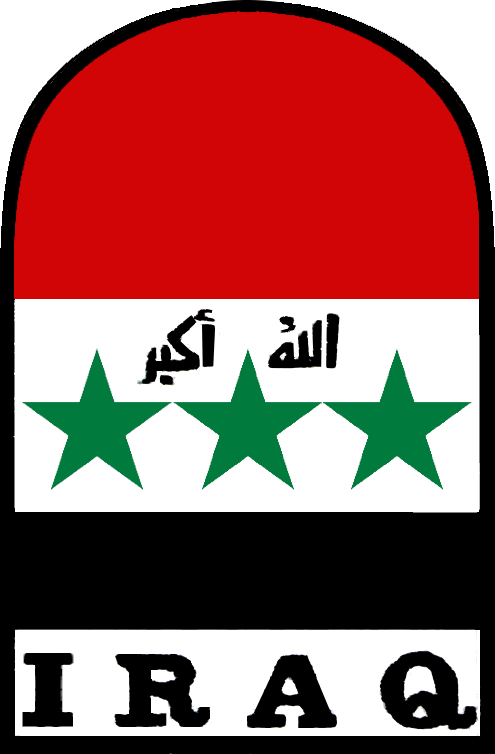
2005

2020–present

=== Rivalries ===
Due to its geographical location, Iraq maintains strong rivalries with many neighbours.

Opponent	GP	W	D	L	GF	GA	GD	Win %
Iran	32	6	8	18	22	44	−22	18.75
Saudi Arabia	45	18	12	15	63	45	+18	40.00
Kuwait	44	19	13	12	59	48	+11	43.18

Iraq's main and traditional rival has been Iran, and they are often considered to be two of the greatest football teams in the Middle East and Asia with one of the greatest rivalries. At the early stage, Iran had proved to be more dominant than Iraq, remaining undefeated from 1964 until 1993. In the contemporary era, especially during the reign of Saddam Hussein, the two countries had bad relations and fought the Iran–Iraq War for eight years. Iraqis have considered any matches against Iran as a must-win encounter and are known to treat it differently from any other football matches. Iraq has played 31 matches against Iran with 6 victories, 8 draws, and 18 losses.

Iraq's other rival is Saudi Arabia, and matches between the two teams also draw significant attention from Iraqi fans, with Iraq and Saudi Arabia being recognised as the two most successful Arab teams in Asia. The beginnings of the footballing rivalry between them dates back to the 1970s, but it was only after the 1990s that the rivalry between the two Arab nations truly developed since it was previously overshadowed by Iraq's rivalries with Iran and Kuwait. One of these reasons for the rivalry to develop is due to the bitter Gulf War, where Iraq fought against Saudi Arabia over Kuwait, an ally of Saudi Arabia. These encounters have also been marred with various controversies and hostilities, such as the 21st Arabian Gulf Cup hosting rights, where Iraq was stripped from hosting with the tournament instead being moved to Bahrain, a move which was believed by Iraqis as a deliberate act by Saudi Arabia to remove Iraq's home advantage. Before that, Iraq was also banned from hosting home games against Saudi Arabia due to the Gulf War. Iraq has played 45 matches against Saudi Arabia with 18 victories, 12 draws, and 15 losses.

Iraq's rivalry with Kuwait was once considered the greatest football rivalry in the Middle East, until being taken over by Iraq's rivalry with Saudi Arabia due to Kuwait's decline. The rivalry began in the mid-1970s. Because of the Gulf War, Iraq and Kuwait were in complete avoidance and never met for more than 15 years until 2005. Iraq has played 44 matches against Kuwait with 19 victories, 13 draws, and 12 losses.

=== Cultural identity and supporters ===
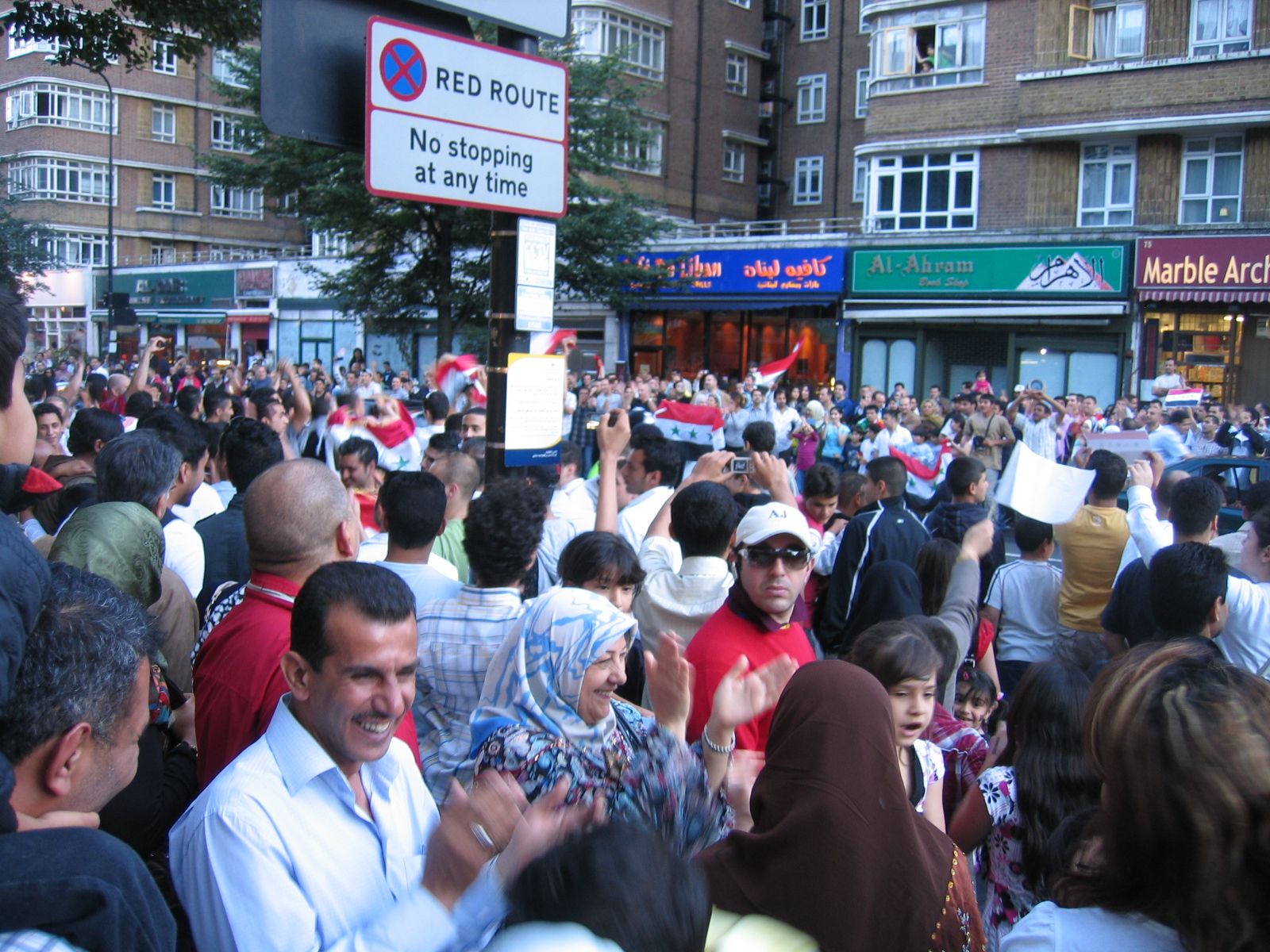
Iraqi fans in London celebrating Iraq winning the 2007 AFC Asian Cup

The Iraq national football team has frequently been viewed as a symbol of national unity within Iraqi society. During periods of war, sanctions and political instability, matches involving the national team often carried social and cultural significance beyond sport itself. Iraq's victory at the 2007 AFC Asian Cup is widely regarded as one of the most significant moments in the country's sporting history. Celebrations following the victory took place across several Iraqi cities and among Iraqi communities abroad, with the triumph frequently described as a unifying national moment.

Iraqi supporter culture is characterised by patriotic chants and strong displays of national symbolism. Among the most widely used chants are "O Victorious Baghdad" (منصورة يا بغداد) or "With our souls and our blood, we will redeem you, O Iraq" (بالروح بالدم نفديك يا عراق) during the Iraqi team's matches.

Another famous chant is "the first goal is coming" (هسه يجي الاول) which is chanted in the beginning of the match. A succeeding chant is "the second goal is coming" (هسه يجي الثاني); this is usually chanted repeatedly after Iraq score a goal to motivate the players to score another.

=== Home matches in Iraq ===
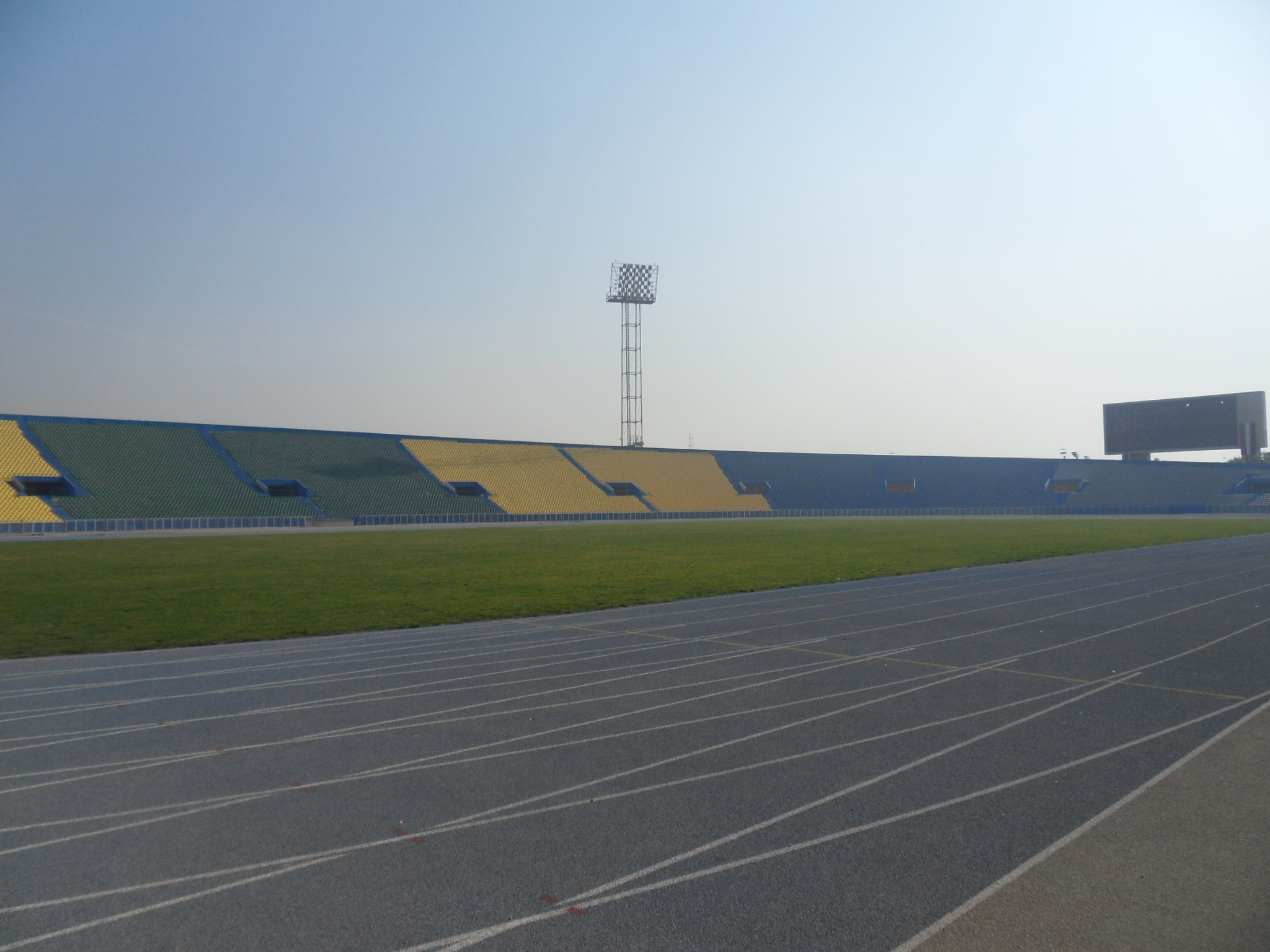
Al-Shaab Stadium, Iraq's home ground from its opening in 1966 up until 2013

Iraq primarily plays its home matches at Basra International Stadium but has also used various other venues across the country. Since 1980, FIFA has imposed bans on Iraq hosting competitive international matches on six occasions.

The first ban came in 1980 after fan and player violence during a match against Kuwait. Although lifted in 1982, the Iran–Iraq War led to a renewed ban. During this period, Iraq played home games at neutral venues but still qualified for the 1986 FIFA World Cup and three Olympic Games tournaments. The ban ended in 1988 after the war.

A new ban followed the Gulf War in 1990 which lasted until 1995. Iraq hosted matches during the 1998 and 2002 FIFA World Cup qualifiers but was again forced to play abroad following the Iraq War in 2003. Home matches resumed in 2009, but security concerns led to another ban in 2011.

Between 2013 and 2018, Iraq hosted friendlies in Baghdad, Basra, and Karbala, culminating in FIFA lifting the ban in 2018. Basra hosted the 2018 AFC Cup Final, while the 2019 WAFF Championship was held in Karbala and Erbil. However, the Iraqi protests in 2019 led to another ban, forcing Iraq to play its home games at neutral venues during the 2022 FIFA World Cup qualifiers.

In 2023, Iraq successfully hosted the Arabian Gulf Cup for the first time since 1979, and resumed hosting official matches for the 2026 FIFA World Cup qualifiers.

Basra International Stadium, the primary venue for Iraq's home matches since its opening in 2013

Stadium	City	Pld	W	D	L	Win %	Last match hosted	Map of the host cities
Al-Shaab Stadium	Baghdad	87	54	24	9	62.1	2013	Iraq national football team is located in Iraq
Basra International Stadium	Basra	26	17	7	2	65.4	2026	Iraq national football team is located in Iraq
Al-Kashafa Stadium	Baghdad	9	6	2	1	66.7	1966	Iraq national football team is located in Iraq
Karbala International Stadium	Karbala	6	3	2	1	50.0	2019	Iraq national football team is located in Iraq
Franso Hariri Stadium	Erbil	4	2	0	2	50.0	2011	Iraq national football team is located in Iraq
Al-Madina Stadium	Baghdad	2	2	0	0	100.0	2022	Iraq national football team is located in Iraq
Al-Fayhaa Stadium	Basra	2	1	1	0	50.0	2021	Iraq national football team is located in Iraq
Al-Minaa Olympic Stadium	Basra	1	1	0	0	100.0	2022	Iraq national football team is located in Iraq
Sulaymaniyah Stadium	Sulaymaniyah	1	0	0	1	0.0	2010	Iraq national football team is located in Iraq
Total		138	86	36	16	62.3%	2026	Iraq national football team is located in Iraq

Last updated: Iraq vs. Iran, 17 November 2026
Statistics include only official international matches.

== Results and fixtures ==
The following is a list of match results in the last 12 months, as well as any future matches that have been scheduled.

Win Draw Loss Fixture

=== 2025 ===
3 December 2025 FIFA Arab Cup	Iraq	2–1	Bahrain	Doha, Qatar
17:30 UTC+3	Lutfalla 10' (o.g.); M. Ali 25'	Report	Hashim 79'; Al-Khattal (red card) 90+3'	Stadium: Stadium 974; Attendance: 9,358; Referee: Pierre Atcho (Gabon)

6 December 2025 FIFA Arab Cup	Sudan	0–2	Iraq	Doha, Qatar
19:00 UTC+3		Report	M. Ali 81'; Attwan 84'	Stadium: Stadium 974; Attendance: 38,639; Referee: Adham Makhadmeh (Jordan)

9 December 2025 FIFA Arab Cup	Algeria	2–0	Iraq	Al Rayyan, Qatar
20:00 UTC+3	Tougai 45+1'; Natiq 46' (o.g.)	Report	H. Ali (red card) 5'	Stadium: Khalifa International Stadium; Attendance: 34,148; Referee: Abdulrahman Al-Jassim (Qatar)

12 December 2025 FIFA Arab Cup	Jordan	1–0	Iraq	Al Rayyan, Qatar
17:30 UTC+3	Olwan 41' (pen.)	Report		Stadium: Education City Stadium; Attendance: 43,486; Referee: Espen Eskås (Norway)

=== 2026 ===
31 March 2026 FIFA World Cup inter-confederation play-offs	Iraq	2–1	Bolivia	Guadalupe, Mexico
21:00 UTC−6	Al-Hamadi 10'; Hussein 53'	Report	Paniagua 38'	Stadium: Estadio BBVA; Attendance: 49,286; Referee: Iván Barton (El Salvador)

29 May Friendly	Andorra	0–1	Iraq	Girona, Spain
18:00 UTC+2			Yousif 20'	Stadium: Estadi Montilivi

4 June Friendly	Spain	1–1	Iraq	A Coruña, Spain
21:00 UTC+2	Torres 16'	Report	Doski 27'	Stadium: Estadio Riazor; Attendance: 30,423; Referee: Florian Badstübner (Germany)

9 June Friendly	Venezuela	2–0	Iraq	Bridgeview, Illinois, United States
20:00 UTC−5	Cásseres Jr. 17'; Ramírez 46'			Stadium: SeatGeek Stadium; Referee: Filip Dujic (Canada)

16 June 2026 FIFA World Cup	Iraq	1–4	Norway	Foxborough, Massachusetts, United States
18:00 UTC−4	Hussein 39'	Report	Haaland 29', 43'; Østigård 76'; Hussein 90+6' (o.g.)	Stadium: Gillette Stadium; Attendance: 63,106; Referee: Pierre Atcho (Gabon)

22 June 2026 FIFA World Cup	France	3–0	Iraq	Philadelphia, United States
17:00 UTC−4	Mbappé 14', 54'; Dembélé 66'	Report		Stadium: Lincoln Financial Field; Attendance: 68,324; Referee: Drew Fischer (Canada)

26 June 2026 FIFA World Cup	Senegal	5–0	Iraq	Toronto, Canada
15:00 UTC−4	Diarra 4'; I. Sarr 56'; P. Gueye 59', 71'; I. Ndiaye 82'	Report		Stadium: BMO Field; Attendance: 43,036; Referee: Anthony Taylor (England)

23 September 27th Arabian Gulf Cup	Iraq	1–1	Oman	Jeddah, Saudi Arabia
17:30 UTC+3	Qasim 6'	Report	Al-Rawahi 67'	Stadium: Prince Abdullah Al-Faisal Sports City Stadium; Referee: Omar Al-Ali (United Arab Emirates)

26 September 27th Arabian Gulf Cup	Kuwait	2–3	Iraq	Jeddah, Saudi Arabia
18:55 UTC+3	Nasser 75' (pen.), 90'	Report	Iqbal 52'; Rasheed 83'; Nabeel 90+9'	Stadium: Prince Abdullah Al-Faisal Sports City Stadium; Attendance: 6,196; Referee: Jalal Jayed (Morocco)

29 September 27th Arabian Gulf Cup	Saudi Arabia	2–0	Iraq	Jeddah, Saudi Arabia
20:30 UTC+3	Al-Salem 55'; Al-Hamdan 69'	Report		Stadium: King Abdullah Sports City Stadium; Attendance: 41,594; Referee: Danny Makkelie (Netherlands)

13 November 2026 Basra International Tournament	Iraq	0–0	Lebanon	Basra, Iraq
18:00 UTC+3		Report		Stadium: Basra International Stadium; Attendance: 21,762; Referee: Ali Abbas (Kuwait)

17 November 2026 Basra International Tournament	Iraq	1–1	Iran	Basra, Iraq
19:15 UTC+3	Al-Saedi 1'	Report	Hazbavi 83'	Stadium: Basra International Stadium; Attendance: 49,742; Referee: Ammar Ashkanani (Kuwait)

=== 2027 ===
TBD 2027 AFC Asian Cup	Tajikistan	v	Iraq	Riyadh, Saudi Arabia
				Stadium: Al Shabab Stadium

TBD 2027 AFC Asian Cup	Iraq	v	Australia	Riyadh, Saudi Arabia
				Stadium: King Saud University Stadium

TBD 2027 AFC Asian Cup	Iraq	v	Singapore	Al Khobar, Saudi Arabia
				Stadium: Aramco Stadium

== All-time results ==
As of 17 November 2026.

Year	GP	W	D	L	Win %	Matches
1957–1969	43	17	14	12	39.53	Matches
1970–1979	119	64	31	24	53.78	Matches
1980–1989	148	78	39	31	52.70	Matches
1990–1999	62	37	16	9	59.68	Matches
2000–2009	143	55	42	46	38.46	Matches
2010–2019	170	69	48	53	40.59	Matches
2020–present	87	38	27	22	43.68	Matches
Total	772	358	217	197	46.37	—

== Coaching staff ==
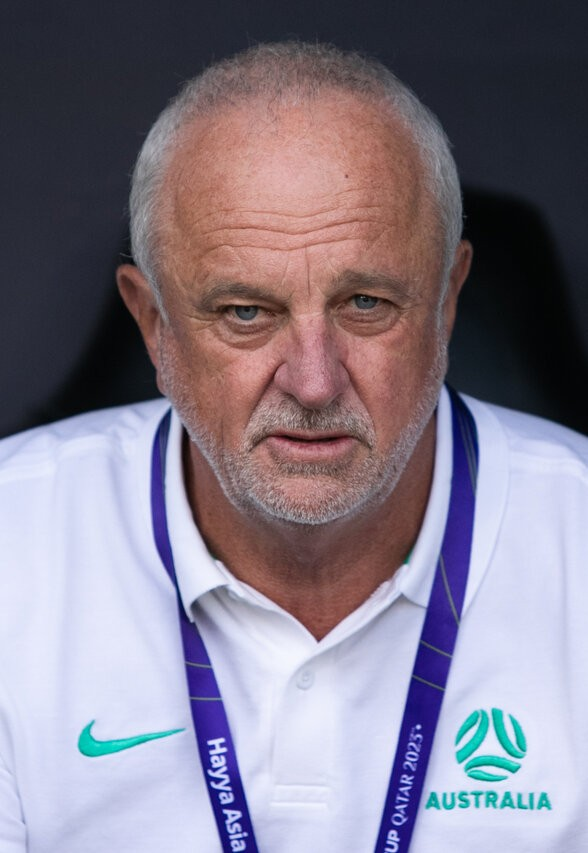
Current head coach Graham Arnold

As of 7 September 2026.

Position	Name
Head Coach	(Australia) Graham Arnold
First Assistant Coach	(Australia) Robert Stanton
Second Assistant Coach	(Australia) Brad Maloney
Goalkeeping Coach	(Australia) Zeljko Kalac
Fitness Coach	(Australia) Elias Boukarim
Lead Technical Analyst	(Australia) Adam Barbera
Technical Analyst	(Australia) (Serbia) Stevan Antonić
Data and Insights Analyst	(Australia) Huw Cox
Lead Opposition Scout	(Australia) Doug Kors
Physiotherapist	(Tunisia) Brahim Boubaker (Tunisia) Marouan Slim
Chief Medical Officer	(Tunisia) Mokhtar Chaabane
Team Doctor	(Tunisia) Mourad Mokrani
Team Manager	(Iraq) Mustafa Jalal
Interpreter	(Iraq) Ali Abbas
Media Coordinator	(Iraq) Alaa Haichel
Security Coordinator	(Iraq) Samed Abu Jaber
Kitman	(Iraq) Abdallah Al-Mahmoudi

== Players ==
=== Current squad ===
The following players were called up for the 2026 Basra International Tournament matches against Lebanon and Iran in November 2026.

Information correct as of 17 November 2026, after the match against Iran.

No.	Pos.	Player	Date of birth (age)	Caps	Goals	Club
1	GK	Mohammed Salih	27 May 1994 (age 32)	0	0	(Iraq Football Association) Al-Quwa Al-Jawiya
12	GK	Kumel Al-Rekabe	19 August 2004 (age 22)	3	0	(Iraq Football Association) Duhok
22	GK	Ahmed Basil	19 August 1996 (age 30)	21	0	(Iraq Football Association) Al-Zawraa
	GK	Hussein Hassan	15 November 2002 (age 24)	0	0	(Iraq Football Association) Erbil
2	DF	Josef Al-Imam	27 July 2004 (age 22)	3	0	(Iraq Football Association) Duhok
3	DF	Ahmed Maknzi	24 September 2001 (age 25)	10	0	(Iraq Football Association) Al-Karma
4	DF	Karrar Amer	16 October 1994 (age 32)	4	0	(Iraq Football Association) Al-Talaba
5	DF	Akam Hashim	16 August 1998 (age 28)	20	1	(Iraq Football Association) Zakho
15	DF	Ahmed Yahya	1 July 1995 (age 31)	25	0	(Iraq Football Association) Al-Shorta
24	DF	Adam Rasheed	10 July 2006 (age 20)	2	0	(Iraq Football Association) Al-Shorta
6	MF	Zaid Ismail	3 January 2002 (age 24)	11	0	(Iraq Football Association) Al-Talaba
7	MF	Jussef Nasrawe	22 March 2007 (age 19)	4	0	(Austrian Football Association) SV Ried
8	MF	Ibrahim Bayesh	1 May 2000 (age 26)	84	8	(Iraq Football Association) Erbil
9	MF	Hussein Ali Al-Saedi	29 November 1996 (age 29)	55	7	(Iraq Football Association) Al-Shorta
10	MF	Zidane Iqbal	27 April 2003 (age 23)	33	3	(Scottish Football Association) Dundee United
11	MF	Peter Gwargis	4 September 2000 (age 26)	5	0	(Egyptian Football Association) Ceramica Cleopatra
14	MF	Amoori Faisal	1 May 2005 (age 21)	1	0	(Iraq Football Association) Al-Karma
16	MF	Amir Al-Ammari	27 July 1997 (age 29)	58	3	(Polish Football Association) Cracovia
17	MF	Hayder Abdulkareem	7 August 2004 (age 22)	1	0	(Saudi Arabian Football Federation) Al-Nassr
19	MF	Hiran Ahmed	6 April 2000 (age 26)	5	0	(Iraq Football Association) Al-Zawraa
20	MF	Aimar Sher	20 December 2002 (age 23)	10	0	(Norwegian Football Federation) Sarpsborg
21	MF	Marko Farji	16 March 2004 (age 22)	16	0	(Royal Dutch Football Association) Heerenveen
23	MF	Siyaband Ageed	3 July 2001 (age 25)	0	0	(Iraq Football Association) Duhok
13	FW	Saif Rasheed	2 March 2000 (age 26)	4	1	(Iraq Football Association) Al-Talaba
18	FW	Aymen Hussein (captain)	22 March 1996 (age 30)	102	34	(Uzbekistan Football Association) Pakhtakor
25	FW	Ahmed Ayed	9 November 2003 (age 23)	2	0	(Iraq Football Association) Al-Kahrabaa
26	FW	Younis Hammoud	17 October 2003 (age 23)	2	0	(Iraq Football Association) Duhok

=== Recent call-ups ===
The following players have been called up to the national team in the past 12 months but are not part of the current squad.

Pos.	Player	Date of birth (age)	Caps	Goals	Club	Latest call-up
GK	Jalal Hassan	18 May 1991 (age 35)	104	0	(Iraq) Al-Shorta	2026 FIFA World Cup
GK	Fahad Talib	21 October 1994 (age 32)	21	0	(Iraq) Al-Karma	2026 FIFA World Cup
DF	Merchas Doski	7 December 1999 (age 26)	36	1	(Czech Republic) Viktoria Plzeň	2026 Basra Tournament ^{INJ}
DF	Zaid Tahseen	29 January 2001 (age 25)	32	1	(Uzbekistan) Pakhtakor	27th Arabian Gulf Cup
DF	Maitham Jabbar	10 November 2000 (age 26)	22	0	(Iraq) Al-Shorta	27th Arabian Gulf Cup
DF	Mustafa Saadoon	25 May 2001 (age 25)	20	0	(Iraq) Zakho	27th Arabian Gulf Cup
DF	Mohammed Dlawar	15 December 2000 (age 25)	1	0	(Iraq) Newroz	27th Arabian Gulf Cup
DF	Rebin Sulaka ^{RET}	12 April 1992 (age 34)	58	1	Free agent	2026 FIFA World Cup
DF	Munaf Younis	16 November 1996 (age 30)	35	1	(Iraq) Duhok	2026 FIFA World Cup
DF	Hussein Ali	1 March 2002 (age 24)	29	1	(Poland) Pogoń Szczecin	2026 FIFA World Cup
DF	Frans Putros	14 July 1993 (age 33)	29	0	(Vietnam) Cong An Hanoi	2026 FIFA World Cup
DF	Dario Naamo	14 June 2005 (age 21)	1	0	(Scotland) Dundee United	2026 FIFA World Cup ^{PRE}
DF	Saad Natiq	19 March 1994 (age 32)	44	1	(Iraq) Al-Minaa	2025 FIFA Arab Cup
DF	Ameer Sabah Khudhair	3 June 1998 (age 28)	0	0	(Iraq) Al-Zawraa	2025 FIFA Arab Cup ^{INJ}
MF	Mohammed Qasim	19 February 2003 (age 23)	28	3	(Iraq) Al-Zawraa	2026 Basra Tournament ^{INJ}
MF	Montader Madjed	24 April 2005 (age 21)	4	0	(Sweden) Hammarby IF	2026 Basra Tournament ^{WD}
MF	Ali Jasim	20 January 2004 (age 22)	41	2	(Iraq) Zakho	27th Arabian Gulf Cup
MF	Hasan Abdulkareem	1 January 1999 (age 27)	23	1	(Iraq) Al-Zawraa	27th Arabian Gulf Cup
MF	Karrar Nabeel	16 January 1998 (age 28)	11	1	(Iraq) Al-Talaba	27th Arabian Gulf Cup
MF	Ahmed Qasem	12 July 2003 (age 23)	8	0	(United States) Nashville	27th Arabian Gulf Cup
MF	Bassam Shakir	19 February 2003 (age 23)	2	0	(Iraq) Al-Shorta	27th Arabian Gulf Cup ^{INJ}
MF	Abdulrazzaq Qasim	19 February 2003 (age 23)	0	0	(Iraq) Al-Minaa	27th Arabian Gulf Cup
MF	Youssef Amyn	21 August 2003 (age 23)	28	2	(Cyprus) AEK Larnaca	2026 FIFA World Cup
MF	Kevin Yakob	10 October 2000 (age 26)	10	0	(Denmark) AGF	2026 FIFA World Cup
MF	Amjad Attwan	12 March 1997 (age 29)	91	5	(Iraq) Zakho	2025 FIFA Arab Cup
MF	Sherko Karim	25 May 1996 (age 30)	28	1	(Iraq) Zakho	2025 FIFA Arab Cup
MF	Sajjad Jassim	7 January 1998 (age 28)	14	1	(Iraq) Al-Karma	2025 FIFA Arab Cup
MF	Osama Rashid	17 January 1992 (age 34)	43	2	(Iraq) Zakho	2025 FIFA Arab Cup ^{INJ}
FW	Ali Al-Hamadi	1 March 2002 (age 24)	23	5	(England) Sheffield Wednesday	27th Arabian Gulf Cup
FW	Mohanad Ali	20 June 2000 (age 26)	73	27	(Iraq) Al-Shorta	2026 FIFA World Cup
FW	Ali Yousif	19 January 1996 (age 30)	8	1	(Iraq) Al-Talaba	2026 FIFA World Cup
FW	Amar Muhsin	27 December 1997 (age 28)	8	0	(South Korea) Gimpo	2025 FIFA Arab Cup
FW	Mohammad Jawad	19 October 1996 (age 30)	3	0	(Iraq) Al-Quwa Al-Jawiya	2025 FIFA Arab Cup
^{SUS} Player suspended^{INJ} Player injured^{PRE} Player was named in preliminary squad^{CLB} Player refused by club or unable to attend due to club commitments^{RET} Player retired from the national team^{WD} Player withdrew for non-injury related reasons

=== Previous squads ===
FIFA World Cup squads
Squads
1986 FIFA World Cup squad
2026 FIFA World Cup squad

AFC Asian Cup squads
Squads
1972 AFC Asian Cup squad
1976 AFC Asian Cup squad
1980 AFC Asian Cup squad
1984 AFC Asian Cup squad
1988 AFC Asian Cup squad
1996 AFC Asian Cup squad
2000 AFC Asian Cup squad
2004 AFC Asian Cup squad
2007 AFC Asian Cup squad
2011 AFC Asian Cup squad
2015 AFC Asian Cup squad
2019 AFC Asian Cup squad
2023 AFC Asian Cup squad

FIFA Confederations Cup squads
Squads
2009 FIFA Confederations Cup squad

Summer Olympics squads
Squads
Olympics 1980 squad
Olympics 1984 squad
Olympics 1988 squad
For Olympic squads since 1992, see the Iraq U-23 team.

== Records ==
As of 17 November 2026.
Players in bold are still active with Iraq.

=== Most appearances ===
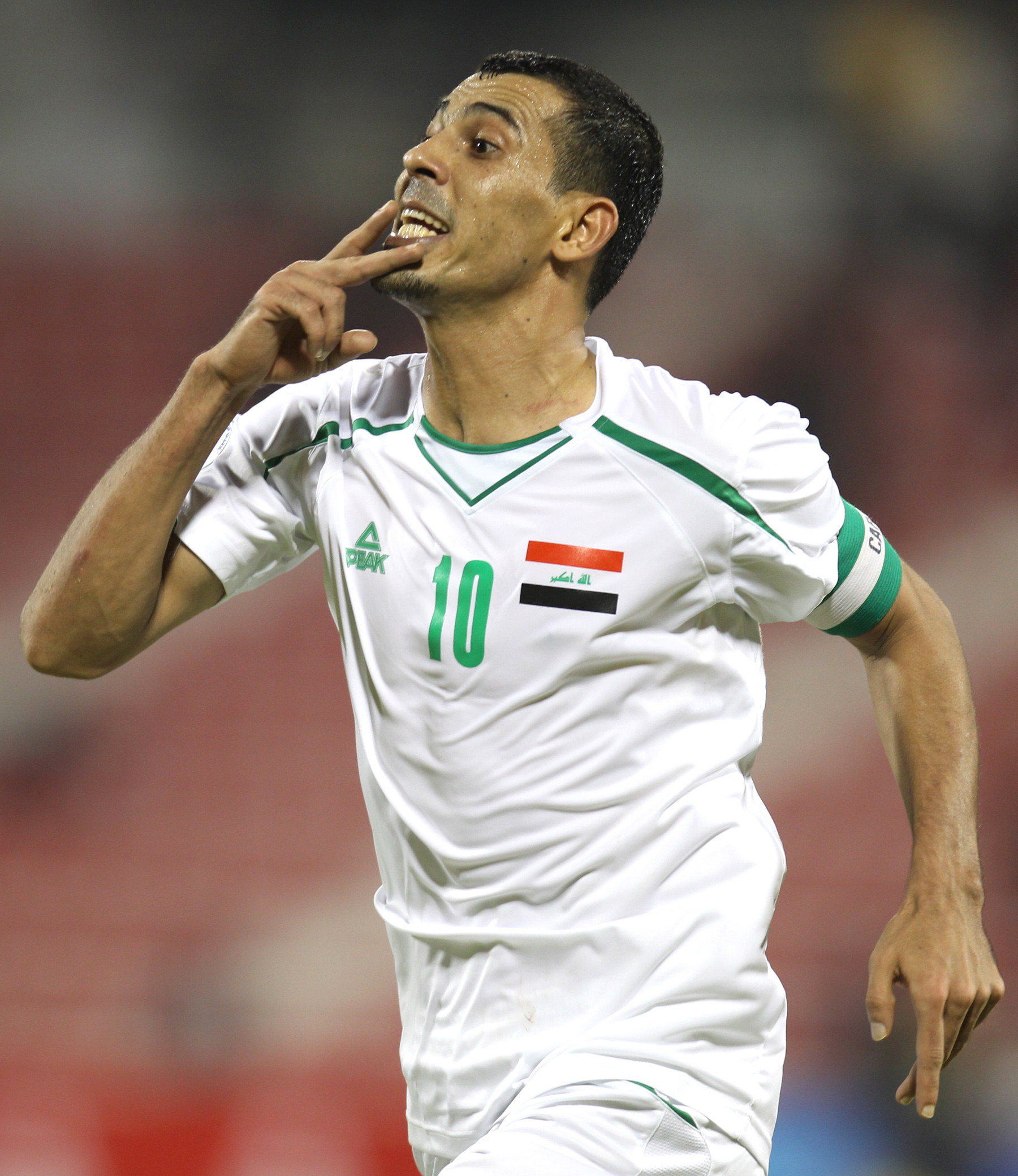
Younis Mahmoud is Iraq's all-time most capped player, having played in 148 official matches.

Rank	Player	Caps	Goals	Career
1	Younis Mahmoud	148	57	2002–2016
2	Hussein Saeed	137	78	1976–1990
3	Alaa Abdul-Zahra	124	17	2007–2021
4	Adnan Dirjal	122	8	1978–1990
5	Ahmed Radhi	121	62	1982–1997
6	Ahmed Ibrahim	117	5	2010–2022
7	Nashat Akram	113	17	2001–2013
7	Hawar Mulla Mohammed	113	20	2001–2012
7	Ali Rehema	113	2	2005–2016
10	Mahdi Karim	110	11	2001–2018

=== Top goalscorers ===
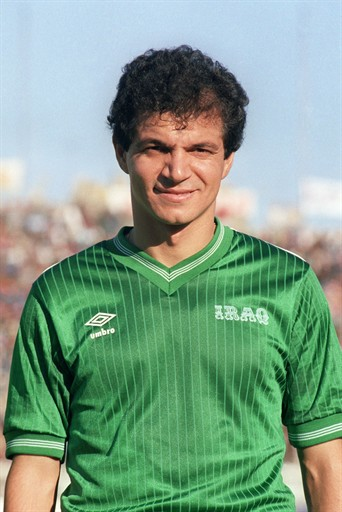
Hussein Saeed is Iraq's all-time leading goalscorer, having scored 78 goals in 137 official matches.

Rank	Player	Goals	Caps	Ratio	Career
1	Hussein Saeed (list)	78	137	0.57	1976–1990
2	Ahmed Radhi	62	121	0.51	1982–1997
3	Younis Mahmoud	57	148	0.39	2002–2016
4	Ali Kadhim	36	84	0.43	1970–1980
5	**Aymen Hussein**	34	102	0.33	2015–present
6	Falah Hassan	29	102	0.28	1970–1986
7	**Mohanad Ali**	27	73	0.37	2017–present
7	Emad Mohammed	27	103	0.26	2001–2012
9	Razzaq Farhan	25	63	0.4	1998–2007
10	Laith Hussein	22	80	0.28	1986–2002

== Competitive record ==
=== FIFA World Cup ===
FIFA World Cup record										Qualification record					
Year	Round	Position	Pld	W	D*	L	GF	GA	Squad	Pld	W	D	L	GF	GA
1930 to 1950	Not a FIFA member									Not a FIFA member					
1954 to 1970	Did not enter									Did not enter					
(West Germany) 1974	Did not qualify									6	3	2	1	11	6
(Argentina) 1978	Withdrew									Withdrew					
(Spain) 1982	Did not qualify									4	3	0	1	5	2
(Mexico) 1986	Group stage	23rd	3	0	0	3	1	4	Squad	8	5	1	2	14	11
(Italy) 1990	Did not qualify									6	3	2	1	11	5
(United States) 1994	Did not qualify									13	7	4	2	37	13
(France) 1998	Did not qualify									4	2	0	2	14	8
(South Korea) (Japan) 2002	Did not qualify									14	6	3	5	37	15
(Germany) 2006	Did not qualify									6	3	2	1	17	7
(South Africa) 2010	Did not qualify									8	3	2	3	11	6
(Brazil) 2014	Did not qualify									16	7	3	6	20	12
(Russia) 2018	Did not qualify									16	6	5	5	24	18
(Qatar) 2022	Did not qualify									18	6	8	4	20	16
(Canada) (Mexico) (United States) 2026	Group stage	48th	3	0	0	3	1	12	Squad	21	13	5	3	32	14
(Morocco) (Portugal) (Spain) 2030	To be determined									To be determined					
(Saudi Arabia) 2034	To be determined									To be determined					
Total	Group stage	2/19	6	0	0	6	2	16	—	140	67	37	36	253	133

FIFA World Cup history
Year	Manager	Round	Score	Result	Goalscorers for Iraq
1986	(Brazil) Evaristo de Macedo	Group stage			
1986	(Brazil) Evaristo de Macedo	Group stage	Iraq 0–1 Paraguay	Loss	
1986	(Brazil) Evaristo de Macedo	Group stage	Iraq 1–2 Belgium	Loss	Radhi 59'
1986	(Brazil) Evaristo de Macedo	Group stage	Iraq 0–1 Mexico	Loss	
2026	(Australia) Graham Arnold	Group stage			
2026	(Australia) Graham Arnold	Group stage	Iraq 1–4 Norway	Loss	Hussein 39'
2026	(Australia) Graham Arnold	Group stage	Iraq 0–3 France	Loss	
2026	(Australia) Graham Arnold	Group stage	Iraq 0–5 Senegal	Loss	
First match: Iraq 0–1 Paraguay – 4 June 1986, Estadio Nemesio Díez, Toluca, Mexico; Biggest win: None; Biggest defeat: Iraq 0–5 Senegal – 26 June 2026, BMO Field, Toronto, Canada; Best finish: Group stage (1986, 2026); Worst finish: Group stage (1986, 2026); Overall top scorer: Ahmed Radhi and Aymen Hussein (1 goal each); Most goals in a single tournament: 1 goal — Ahmed Radhi (1986), Aymen Hussein (2026)

=== AFC Asian Cup ===
AFC Asian Cup record										Qualification record					
Year	Round	Position	Pld	W	D*	L	GF	GA	Squad	Pld	W	D	L	GF	GA
1956 to 1968	Not an AFC member									Not an AFC member					
(Thailand) 1972	Group stage	6th	3	0	2	1	1	4	Squad	6	5	1	0	13	2
(Iran) 1976	Fourth place	4th	4	1	0	3	3	6	Squad	6	5	1	0	14	3
(Kuwait) 1980	Withdrew									Withdrew					
(Singapore) 1984	Withdrew									Withdrew					
(Qatar) 1988	Withdrew									Withdrew					
(Japan) 1992	Banned due to Gulf War									Banned due to Gulf War					
(United Arab Emirates) 1996	Quarter-finals	6th	4	2	0	2	6	4	Squad	2	2	0	0	4	0
(Lebanon) 2000	Quarter-finals	8th	4	1	1	2	5	7	Squad	3	3	0	0	9	2
(China) 2004	Quarter-finals	8th	4	2	0	2	5	7	Squad	6	4	1	1	16	4
(Indonesia) (Malaysia) (Thailand) (Vietnam) 2007	Champions	1st	6	3	3	0	7	2	Squad	6	3	2	1	12	8
(Qatar) 2011	Quarter-finals	8th	4	2	0	2	3	3	Squad	Qualified as defending champions					
(Australia) 2015	Fourth place	4th	6	2	1	3	8	9	Squad	6	3	0	3	7	6
(United Arab Emirates) 2019	Round of 16	14th	4	2	1	1	6	3	Squad	6	3	3	0	13	6
(Qatar) 2023	Round of 16	12th	4	3	0	1	10	7	Squad	8	5	2	1	14	4
(Saudi Arabia) 2027	Qualified									6	6	0	0	17	2
Total	1 Title	11/15	43	18	8	17	54	52	—	55	39	10	6	119	37
Champions Runners-up Third place Fourth place *Draws include knockout matches decided via penalty shoot-out.

AFC Asian Cup history
Year	Manager	Round	Score	Result	Goalscorers for Iraq
1972	(Iraq) Abdelilah Mohammed Hassan	Group allocation matches			
1972	(Iraq) Abdelilah Mohammed Hassan	Group allocation matches	Iraq 0–0 (a.e.t.) (4–2 p) South Korea	Draw	
1972	(Iraq) Abdelilah Mohammed Hassan	Group stage			
1972	(Iraq) Abdelilah Mohammed Hassan	Group stage	Iraq 0–3 Iran	Loss	
1972	(Iraq) Abdelilah Mohammed Hassan	Group stage	Iraq 1–1 Thailand	Draw	Yousif 6'
1976	(Socialist Federal Republic of Yugoslavia) Lenko Grčić	Group stage			
1976	(Socialist Federal Republic of Yugoslavia) Lenko Grčić	Group stage	Iraq 0–2 Iran	Loss	
1976	(Socialist Federal Republic of Yugoslavia) Lenko Grčić	Group stage	Iraq 1–0 South Yemen	Win	Waal 84'
1976	(Socialist Federal Republic of Yugoslavia) Lenko Grčić	Semi-finals			
1976	(Socialist Federal Republic of Yugoslavia) Lenko Grčić	Semi-finals	Iraq 2–3 (a.e.t.) Kuwait	Loss	Abdul-Jalil 46', Hassan 85'
1976	(Socialist Federal Republic of Yugoslavia) Lenko Grčić	Third place match			
1976	(Socialist Federal Republic of Yugoslavia) Lenko Grčić	Third place match	Iraq 0–1 China	Loss	
1996	(Iraq) Yahya Alwan	Group stage			
1996	(Iraq) Yahya Alwan	Group stage	Iraq 2–1 Iran	Win	Fawzi 37', Sabbar 69'
1996	(Iraq) Yahya Alwan	Group stage	Iraq 0–1 Saudi Arabia	Loss	
1996	(Iraq) Yahya Alwan	Group stage	Iraq 4–1 Thailand	Win	H. Mahmoud 17', 50', L. Hussein 23', 63'
1996	(Iraq) Yahya Alwan	Quarter-finals			
1996	(Iraq) Yahya Alwan	Quarter-finals	Iraq 0–1 (a.e.t.) United Arab Emirates	Loss	
2000	(Federal Republic of Yugoslavia) Milan Živadinović	Group stage			
2000	(Federal Republic of Yugoslavia) Milan Živadinović	Group stage	Iraq 2–0 Thailand	Win	Chathir 27', H. Mahmoud 60'
2000	(Federal Republic of Yugoslavia) Milan Živadinović	Group stage	Iraq 2–2 Lebanon	Draw	Jeayer 5', 22'
2000	(Federal Republic of Yugoslavia) Milan Živadinović	Group stage	Iraq 0–1 Iran	Loss	
2000	(Federal Republic of Yugoslavia) Milan Živadinović	Quarter-finals			
2000	(Federal Republic of Yugoslavia) Milan Živadinović	Quarter-finals	Iraq 1–4 Japan	Loss	Obeid 4'
2004	(Iraq) Adnan Hamad	Group stage			
2004	(Iraq) Adnan Hamad	Group stage	Iraq 0–1 Uzbekistan	Loss	
2004	(Iraq) Adnan Hamad	Group stage	Iraq 3–2 Turkmenistan	Win	Mohammed 12', Farhan 80', Munir 88'
2004	(Iraq) Adnan Hamad	Group stage	Iraq 2–1 Saudi Arabia	Win	Akram 51', Y. Mahmoud 86'
2004	(Iraq) Adnan Hamad	Quarter-finals			
2004	(Iraq) Adnan Hamad	Quarter-finals	Iraq 0–3 China	Loss	
2007	(Brazil) Jorvan Vieira	Group stage			
2007	(Brazil) Jorvan Vieira	Group stage	Iraq 1–1 Thailand	Draw	Y. Mahmoud 32'
2007	(Brazil) Jorvan Vieira	Group stage	Iraq 3–1 Australia	Win	Akram 22', Mohammed 60', K. Jassim 86'
2007	(Brazil) Jorvan Vieira	Group stage	Iraq 0–0 Oman	Draw	
2007	(Brazil) Jorvan Vieira	Quarter-finals			
2007	(Brazil) Jorvan Vieira	Quarter-finals	Iraq 2–0 Vietnam	Win	Y. Mahmoud 2', 65'
2007	(Brazil) Jorvan Vieira	Semi-finals			
2007	(Brazil) Jorvan Vieira	Semi-finals	Iraq 0–0 (a.e.t.) (4–3 p) South Korea	Draw	
2007	(Brazil) Jorvan Vieira	Final			
2007	(Brazil) Jorvan Vieira	Final	Iraq 1–0 Saudi Arabia	Win	Y. Mahmoud 72'
2011	(Germany) Wolfgang Sidka	Group stage			
2011	(Germany) Wolfgang Sidka	Group stage	Iraq 1–2 Iran	Loss	Y. Mahmoud 13'
2011	(Germany) Wolfgang Sidka	Group stage	Iraq 1–0 United Arab Emirates	Win	W. Abbas 90+3' (o.g.)
2011	(Germany) Wolfgang Sidka	Group stage	Iraq 1–0 North Korea	Win	Jassim 22'
2011	(Germany) Wolfgang Sidka	Quarter-finals			
2011	(Germany) Wolfgang Sidka	Quarter-finals	Iraq 0–1 (a.e.t.) Australia	Loss	
2015	(Iraq) Radhi Shenaishil	Group stage			
2015	(Iraq) Radhi Shenaishil	Group stage	Iraq 1–0 Jordan	Win	Kasim 77'
2015	(Iraq) Radhi Shenaishil	Group stage	Iraq 0–1 Japan	Loss	
2015	(Iraq) Radhi Shenaishil	Group stage	Iraq 2–0 Palestine	Win	Y. Mahmoud 48', Yasin 88'
2015	(Iraq) Radhi Shenaishil	Quarter-finals			
2015	(Iraq) Radhi Shenaishil	Quarter-finals	Iraq 3–3 (a.e.t.) (7–6 p) Iran	Draw	Yasin 56', Y. Mahmoud 93', Ismail 116' (pen.)
2015	(Iraq) Radhi Shenaishil	Semi-finals			
2015	(Iraq) Radhi Shenaishil	Semi-finals	Iraq 0–2 South Korea	Loss	
2015	(Iraq) Radhi Shenaishil	Third place match			
2015	(Iraq) Radhi Shenaishil	Third place match	Iraq 2–3 United Arab Emirates	Loss	Salim 28', Kalaf 42'
2019	(Slovenia) Srečko Katanec	Group stage			
2019	(Slovenia) Srečko Katanec	Group stage	Iraq 3–2 Vietnam	Win	Ali 35', Tariq 60', Adnan 90'
2019	(Slovenia) Srečko Katanec	Group stage	Iraq 3–0 Yemen	Win	Ali 11', Resan 19', Abbas 90+1'
2019	(Slovenia) Srečko Katanec	Group stage	Iraq 0–0 Iran	Draw	
2019	(Slovenia) Srečko Katanec	Round of 16			
2019	(Slovenia) Srečko Katanec	Round of 16	Iraq 0–1 Qatar	Loss	
2023	(Spain) Jesús Casas	Group stage			
2023	(Spain) Jesús Casas	Group stage	Iraq 3–1 Indonesia	Win	Ali 17', Rashid 45+7', A. Hussein 75'
2023	(Spain) Jesús Casas	Group stage	Iraq 2–1 Japan	Win	A. Hussein 5', 45+4'
2023	(Spain) Jesús Casas	Group stage	Iraq 3–2 Vietnam	Win	Sulaka 47', A. Hussein 73', 90+12' (pen.)
2023	(Spain) Jesús Casas	Round of 16			
2023	(Spain) Jesús Casas	Round of 16	Iraq 2–3 Jordan	Loss	Natiq 68', A. Hussein 76'
First match: Iraq 0–0 South Korea – 7 May 1972, National Stadium, Bangkok, Thailand; Biggest win: Iraq 4–1 Thailand – 11 December 1996 and Iraq 3–0 Yemen – 12 January 2019; Biggest defeat: Iraq 0–3 Iran – 9 May 1972 and Iraq 1–4 Japan – 24 October 2000 and Iraq 0–3 China – 30 July 2004; Best finish: Champions (2007); Worst finish: Group stage (1972); Overall top scorer: Younis Mahmoud (8 goals); Most goals in a single tournament: Aymen Hussein (6 goals, 2023); Draws include knockout matches decided via penalty shoot-out.

=== FIFA Confederations Cup ===
FIFA Confederations Cup record
Year	Round	Position	Pld	W	D	L	GF	GA	Squad
1992	Did not enter								
1995	Banned due to Gulf War								
1997	Did not qualify								
1999	Did not qualify								
2001	Did not qualify								
2003	Did not qualify								
2005	Did not qualify								
2009	Group stage	7th	3	0	2	1	0	1	Squad
2013	Did not qualify								
2017	Did not qualify								
Total	Best: Group stage	1/10	3	0	2	1	0	1	—

FIFA Confederations Cup history
Year	Manager	Round	Score	Result	Goalscorers for Iraq
2009	(Serbia) Bora Milutinović	Group stage	Iraq 0–0 South Africa	Draw	
2009	(Serbia) Bora Milutinović	Group stage	Iraq 0–1 Spain	Loss	
2009	(Serbia) Bora Milutinović	Group stage	Iraq 0–0 New Zealand	Draw	
First match: Iraq 0–0 South Africa – 14 June 2009, Ellis Park Stadium, Johannesburg, South Africa; Biggest win: None; Biggest defeat: Iraq 0–1 Spain – 17 June 2009, Free State Stadium, Bloemfontein, South Africa; Best finish: Group stage (2009); Worst finish: Group stage (2009); Overall top scorer: None; Most goals in a single tournament: None

=== Summer Olympics ===
Summer Olympics record										Qualification record					
Year	Round	Position	Pld	W	D	L	GF	GA	Squad	Pld	W	D	L	GF	GA
1900 to 1936	Not an IOC member									Not an IOC member					
1948 to 1956	Did not enter									Did not enter					
1960	Did not qualify									4	2	0	2	14	10
1964	Did not qualify									2	0	1	1	0	4
1968	Did not qualify									4	1	1	2	7	5
1972	Did not qualify									5	3	0	2	4	5
1976	Did not qualify									4	2	0	2	6	4
1980	Quarter-finals	8th	4	1	2	1	4	5	Squad	5	3	1	1	10	3
1984	Group stage	14th	3	0	1	2	3	6	Squad	8	4	3	1	10	7
1988	Group stage	10th	3	1	1	1	5	4	Squad	8	6	1	1	14	6
1992 to present	See Iraq national under-23 football team									See Iraq national under-23 football team					
Total	Quarter-finals	3/11	10	2	4	4	12	15	—	40	21	7	12	65	44

Summer Olympics history
Year	Manager	Round	Score	Result	Goalscorers for Iraq
1980	(Iraq) Anwar Jassam	Group stage			
1980	(Iraq) Anwar Jassam	Group stage	Iraq 3–0 Costa Rica	Win	Ahmed 45', Saeed 49', Hassan 75'
1980	(Iraq) Anwar Jassam	Group stage	Iraq 0–0 Finland	Draw	
1980	(Iraq) Anwar Jassam	Group stage	Iraq 1–1 Yugoslavia	Draw	Hassan 61'
1980	(Iraq) Anwar Jassam	Quarter-finals			
1980	(Iraq) Anwar Jassam	Quarter-finals	Iraq 0–4 East Germany	Loss	
1984	(Iraq) Ammo Baba	Group stage			
1984	(Iraq) Ammo Baba	Group stage	Iraq 1–1 Canada	Draw	Saeed 83'
1984	(Iraq) Ammo Baba	Group stage	Iraq 0–1 Cameroon	Loss	
1984	(Iraq) Ammo Baba	Group stage	Iraq 2–4 Yugoslavia	Loss	Saeed 17', Shihab 43'
1988	(Iraq) Ammo Baba	Group stage			
1988	(Iraq) Ammo Baba	Group stage	Iraq 2–2 Zambia	Draw	Radhi 36' (pen.), Allawi 71'
1988	(Iraq) Ammo Baba	Group stage	Iraq 3–0 Guatemala	Win	Radhi 57', Jabbar 67', Mazariegos 77' (o.g.)
1988	(Iraq) Ammo Baba	Group stage	Iraq 0–2 Italy	Loss	
1992–present
1992–present	See Iraq national under-23 football team				
First match: Iraq 3–0 Costa Rica – 21 July 1980, Republican Stadium, Kyiv, Soviet Union; Biggest win: Iraq 3–0 Costa Rica – 21 July 1980 and Iraq 3–0 Guatemala – 19 September 1988; Biggest defeat: Iraq 0–4 East Germany – 27 July 1980, Republican Stadium, Kyiv, Soviet Union; Best finish: Quarter-finals (1980); Worst finish: Group stage (1984, 1988); Overall top scorer: Hussein Saeed (3 goals); Most goals in a single tournament: 2 goals — Falah Hassan (1980), Hussein Saeed (1984), Ahmed Radhi (1988)

=== Asian Games ===
Asian Games record
Year	Round	Position	Pld	W	D*	L	GF	GA	Squad
1951 to 1970	Did not enter								
1974	Second round	5th	6	3	2	1	6	2	Squad
1978	Fourth place	4th	7	4	1	2	11	4	Squad
1982	Gold medalists	1st	6	5	0	1	11	2	Squad
1986	Quarter-finals	6th	5	3	1	1	13	5	Squad
1990 to 1998	Banned due to Gulf War								
2002 to present	See Iraq national under-23 football team								
Total	1 Title	4/13	24	15	4	5	41	13	—

Asian Games history
Year	Manager	Round	Score	Result	Goalscorers for Iraq
1974	(Iraq) Thamir Muhsin	First round			
1974	(Iraq) Thamir Muhsin	First round	Iraq 3–0 India	Win	Jassam 19', Hassan 27', Kadhim 58'
1974	(Iraq) Thamir Muhsin	First round	Iraq 1–0 North Korea	Win	Jassam 73'
1974	(Iraq) Thamir Muhsin	First round	Iraq 1–0 China	Win	Hatim 24'
1974	(Iraq) Thamir Muhsin	Second round			
1974	(Iraq) Thamir Muhsin	Second round	Iraq 1–1 South Korea	Draw	Jassam 74'
1974	(Iraq) Thamir Muhsin	Second round	Iraq 0–0 Malaysia	Draw	
1974	(Iraq) Thamir Muhsin	Second round	Iraq 0–1 Iran	Loss	
1978	(Iraq) Ammo Baba	First round			
1978	(Iraq) Ammo Baba	First round	Iraq 2–1 Qatar	Win	Subhi 35', Farhan 90'
1978	(Iraq) Ammo Baba	First round	Iraq 2–0 China	Win	Saeed 44', 62' (o.g.)
1978	(Iraq) Ammo Baba	First round	Iraq 1–1 Saudi Arabia	Draw	Ali 53' (pen.)
1978	(Iraq) Ammo Baba	Second round			
1978	(Iraq) Ammo Baba	Second round	Iraq 0–1 North Korea	Loss	
1978	(Iraq) Ammo Baba	Second round	Iraq 3–0 Kuwait	Win	Mahmoud 40', Saeed 55', Abdul-Sahib 85'
1978	(Iraq) Ammo Baba	Second round	Iraq 3–0 India	Win	Mahmoud 20', Shaker 25', Saeed 63'
1978	(Iraq) Ammo Baba	Bronze medal match			
1978	(Iraq) Ammo Baba	Bronze medal match	Iraq 0–1 China	Loss	
1982	(Iraq) Ammo Baba	Group stage			
1982	(Iraq) Ammo Baba	Group stage	Iraq 4–0 Burma	Win	Hashim 10', Saeed 32', Shihab 54', Mohammed 86'
1982	(Iraq) Ammo Baba	Group stage	Iraq 3–0 Nepal	Win	Odisho 3', Saeed 56', 75'
1982	(Iraq) Ammo Baba	Group stage	Iraq 1–2 Kuwait	Loss	Shihab 73'
1982	(Iraq) Ammo Baba	Quarter-finals			
1982	(Iraq) Ammo Baba	Quarter-finals	Iraq 1–0 (a.e.t.) Japan	Win	Jassim 102'
1982	(Iraq) Ammo Baba	Semi-finals			
1982	(Iraq) Ammo Baba	Semi-finals	Iraq 1–0 Saudi Arabia	Win	Mohammed 17'
1982	(Iraq) Ammo Baba	Final			
1982	(Iraq) Ammo Baba	Final	Iraq 1–0 Kuwait	Win	Saeed 82'
1986	(Iraq) Akram Salman	Group stage			
1986	(Iraq) Akram Salman	Group stage	Iraq 4–0 Oman	Win	Allawi 12', 70', Saeed 29', Radhi 80'
1986	(Iraq) Akram Salman	Group stage	Iraq 5–1 Pakistan	Win	Radhi 14' (pen.), 36', Hameed 21', Mohammed 34', 86'
1986	(Iraq) Akram Salman	Group stage	Iraq 1–2 United Arab Emirates	Loss	Saeed 84'
1986	(Iraq) Akram Salman	Group stage	Iraq 2–1 Thailand	Win	Dirjal 50', Mohammed 79'
1986	(Iraq) Akram Salman	Quarter-finals			
1986	(Iraq) Akram Salman	Quarter-finals	Iraq 1–1 (a.e.t.) (8–9 p) Saudi Arabia	Draw	Mohammed 51'
2002–present
2002–present	See Iraq national under-23 football team				
First match: Iraq 3–0 India – 2 September 1974, Amjadieh Stadium, Tehran, Iran; Biggest win: Iraq 4–0 Burma – 21 November 1982 and Iraq 4–0 Oman – 21 September 1986 and Iraq 5–1 Pakistan – 23 September 1986; Biggest defeat: Iraq 0–1 Iran – 13 September 1974 and Iraq 0–1 North Korea – 17 December 1978 and Iraq 0–1 China – 20 December 1978 and Iraq 1–2 Kuwait – 25 November 1982 and Iraq 1–2 United Arab Emirates – 25 September 1986; Best finish: Gold medalists (1982); Worst finish: Second round (1974), Quarter-finals (1986); Overall top scorer: Hussein Saeed (9 goals); Most goals in a single tournament: 4 goals — Hussein Saeed (1982), Haris Mohammed (1986)

=== Regional competitions ===
==== WAFF Championship ====
WAFF Championship record
Year	Result	Pld	W	D*	L	GF	GA	Squad
2000	Third place	5	3	2	0	10	2	Squad
2002	Champions	4	3	1	0	6	2	Squad
2004	Fourth place	4	1	0	3	4	8	Squad
2007	Runners-up	4	2	1	1	5	2	Squad
2008	Withdrew							
2010	Semi-finals	3	2	0	1	6	3	Squad
2012	Runners-up	4	2	1	1	4	2	Squad
2013	Group stage	2	0	2	0	0	0	Squad
2019	Runners-up	5	3	1	1	5	3	Squad
Total	1 Title	31	16	8	7	40	22	—

WAFF Championship history
Year	Manager	Round	Score	Result	Goalscorers for Iraq
2000	(Iraq) Adnan Hamad	Group stage			
2000	(Iraq) Adnan Hamad	Group stage	Iraq 2–1 Lebanon	Win	Obeid 63' (pen.), Fawzi 66'
2000	(Iraq) Adnan Hamad	Group stage	Iraq 0–0 Jordan	Draw	
2000	(Iraq) Adnan Hamad	Group stage	Iraq 4–0 Kyrgyzstan	Win	Farhan 28', 35', 75', H. Mohammed 67'
2000	(Iraq) Adnan Hamad	Semi-finals			
2000	(Iraq) Adnan Hamad	Semi-finals	Iraq 0–0 (a.e.t.) (3–5 p) Syria	Draw	
2000	(Iraq) Adnan Hamad	Third place match			
2000	(Iraq) Adnan Hamad	Third place match	Iraq 4–1 Jordan	Win	Farhan 16', 74', Kadhim 30', Hadi 37'
2002	(Iraq) Adnan Hamad	Group stage			
2002	(Iraq) Adnan Hamad	Group stage	Iraq 2–0 Palestine	Win	Wahaib 47', Farhan 69'
2002	(Iraq) Adnan Hamad	Group stage	Iraq 1–0 Syria	Win	Kadhim 43'
2002	(Iraq) Adnan Hamad	Semi-finals			
2002	(Iraq) Adnan Hamad	Semi-finals	Iraq 0–0 (a.e.t.) (6–5 p) Iran	Draw	
2002	(Iraq) Adnan Hamad	Final			
2002	(Iraq) Adnan Hamad	Final	Iraq 3–2 (a.e.t.) Jordan	Win	Farhan 32', Y. Mahmoud 89', H. Mahmoud 103'
2004	(Germany) Bernd Stange	Group stage			
2004	(Germany) Bernd Stange	Group stage	Iraq 2–1 Palestine	Win	E. Mohammed 41', 83'
2004	(Germany) Bernd Stange	Group stage	Iraq 0–2 Jordan	Loss	
2004	(Germany) Bernd Stange	Semi-finals			
2004	(Germany) Bernd Stange	Semi-finals	Iraq 1–2 Iran	Loss	Mnajed 30'
2004	(Germany) Bernd Stange	Third place match			
2004	(Germany) Bernd Stange	Third place match	Iraq 1–3 Jordan	Loss	E. Mohammed 81'
2007	(Brazil) Jorvan Vieira	Group stage			
2007	(Brazil) Jorvan Vieira	Group stage	Iraq 0–0 Iran	Draw	
2007	(Brazil) Jorvan Vieira	Group stage	Iraq 1–0 Palestine	Win	H. M. Mohammed 86'
2007	(Brazil) Jorvan Vieira	Semi-finals			
2007	(Brazil) Jorvan Vieira	Semi-finals	Iraq 3–0 Syria	Win	Y. Mahmoud 10' (pen.), Mnajed 42', Sadir 85'
2007	(Brazil) Jorvan Vieira	Final			
2007	(Brazil) Jorvan Vieira	Final	Iraq 1–2 Iran	Loss	Sadir 86' (pen.)
2010	(Germany) Wolfgang Sidka	Group stage			
2010	(Germany) Wolfgang Sidka	Group stage	Iraq 2–1 Yemen	Win	Saeed 49', H. M. Mohammed 72'
2010	(Germany) Wolfgang Sidka	Group stage	Iraq 3–0 Palestine	Win	Karim 15', 76', Akram 86' (pen.)
2010	(Germany) Wolfgang Sidka	Semi-finals			
2010	(Germany) Wolfgang Sidka	Semi-finals	Iraq 1–2 Iran	Loss	Karim 71'
2012	(Iraq) Hakeem Shaker	Group stage			
2012	(Iraq) Hakeem Shaker	Group stage	Iraq 1–0 Jordan	Win	Ahmed 62'
2012	(Iraq) Hakeem Shaker	Group stage	Iraq 1–1 Syria	Draw	Al Masri 11' (o.g.)
2012	(Iraq) Hakeem Shaker	Semi-finals			
2012	(Iraq) Hakeem Shaker	Semi-finals	Iraq 2–0 Oman	Win	Radhi 6', Yasin 39'
2012	(Iraq) Hakeem Shaker	Final			
2012	(Iraq) Hakeem Shaker	Final	Iraq 0–1 Syria	Loss	
2013	(Iraq) Hadi Mutanash	Group stage			
2013	(Iraq) Hadi Mutanash	Group stage	Iraq 0–0 Bahrain	Draw	
2013	(Iraq) Hadi Mutanash	Group stage	Iraq 0–0 Oman	Draw	
2019	(Slovenia) Srečko Katanec	Group stage			
2019	(Slovenia) Srečko Katanec	Group stage	Iraq 1–0 Lebanon	Win	Ali 57'
2019	(Slovenia) Srečko Katanec	Group stage	Iraq 2–1 Palestine	Win	Abdul-Raheem 22', Ali 83' (pen.)
2019	(Slovenia) Srečko Katanec	Group stage	Iraq 0–0 Syria	Draw	
2019	(Slovenia) Srečko Katanec	Group stage	Iraq 2–1 Yemen	Win	Bayesh 26', Ali 31' (pen.)
2019	(Slovenia) Srečko Katanec	Final			
2019	(Slovenia) Srečko Katanec	Final	Iraq 0–1 Bahrain	Loss	
First match: Iraq 2–1 Lebanon – 23 May 2000, King Abdullah II Stadium, Amman, Jordan; Biggest win: Iraq 4–0 Kyrgyzstan – 27 May 2000, King Abdullah II Stadium, Amman, Jordan; Biggest defeat: Iraq 0–2 Jordan – 21 June 2004 and Iraq 1–3 Jordan – 25 June 2004; Best finish: Champions (2002); Worst finish: Group stage (2013); Overall top scorer: Razzaq Farhan (7 goals); Most goals in a single tournament: Razzaq Farhan (5 goals, 2000)

==== Arab Cup ====
FIFA Arab Cup record									Qualification record					
Year	Result	Pld	W	D*	L	GF	GA	Squad	Pld	W	D	L	GF	GA
1963	Did not enter								No qualifying tournament					
1964	Champions	4	3	1	0	6	2	Squad	No qualifying tournament					
1966	Champions	6	5	1	0	20	5	Squad	No qualifying tournament					
1985	Champions	4	3	1	0	7	3	Squad	1	0	0	1	2	3
1988	Champions	6	2	4	0	7	2	Squad	Qualified as defending champions					
1992 to 2002	Banned due to Gulf War								Banned due to Gulf War					
2012	Third place	5	3	1	1	6	4	Squad	No qualifying tournament					
2021	Group stage	3	0	2	1	1	4	Squad	Qualified automatically					
2025	Quarter-finals	4	2	0	2	4	4	Squad	Qualified automatically					
Total	4 Titles	32	18	10	4	51	24	—	1	0	0	1	2	3

Arab Cup history
Year	Manager	Round	Score	Result	Goalscorers for Iraq
1964	(Iraq) Adil Basher	Round-robin			
1964	(Iraq) Adil Basher	Round-robin	Iraq 1–0 Kuwait	Win	S. Ismail 60'
1964	(Iraq) Adil Basher	Round-robin	Iraq 1–0 Lebanon	Win	Tabra 25'
1964	(Iraq) Adil Basher	Round-robin	Iraq 1–1 Libya	Draw	Atta 70'
1964	(Iraq) Adil Basher	Round-robin	Iraq 3–1 Jordan	Win	Atta 15', 37', Q. Mahmoud 31'
1966	(Iraq) Adil Basher	Group stage			
1966	(Iraq) Adil Basher	Group stage	Iraq 3–1 Kuwait	Win	Yousif 19', Dhiab 28', Atta 78'
1966	(Iraq) Adil Basher	Group stage	Iraq 2–1 Jordan	Win	Assad 2', Atta 82'
1966	(Iraq) Adil Basher	Group stage	Iraq 10–1 Bahrain	Win	G. Ismail 6', Dhiab 18', 42', 49', 66', Jameel 25', 55', Dawood 35', Hameed 39', Najim
1966	(Iraq) Adil Basher	Group stage	Iraq 0–0 Lebanon	Draw	
1966	(Iraq) Adil Basher	Semi-finals			
1966	(Iraq) Adil Basher	Semi-finals	Iraq 3–1 Libya	Win	Q. Mahmoud 12', Balah 22' (pen.), Atta 74'
1966	(Iraq) Adil Basher	Final			
1966	(Iraq) Adil Basher	Final	Iraq 2–1 Syria	Win	G. Ismail 65', 81'
1985	(Iraq) Anwar Jassam	Group stage			
1985	(Iraq) Anwar Jassam	Group stage	Iraq 1–1 Bahrain	Draw	Abid 42'
1985	(Iraq) Anwar Jassam	Group stage	Iraq 2–0 Mauritania	Win	S. Mahmoud 42', Abid 60'
1985	(Iraq) Anwar Jassam	Semi-finals			
1985	(Iraq) Anwar Jassam	Semi-finals	Iraq 3–2 Saudi Arabia	Win	Abid 13', 18', Rashid 28'
1985	(Iraq) Anwar Jassam	Final			
1985	(Iraq) Anwar Jassam	Final	Iraq 1–0 Bahrain	Win	Abid 21'
1988	(Iraq) Jamal Salih	Group stage			
1988	(Iraq) Jamal Salih	Group stage	Iraq 1–1 Tunisia	Draw	Radhi 32'
1988	(Iraq) Jamal Salih	Group stage	Iraq 0–0 Lebanon	Draw	
1988	(Iraq) Ammo Baba	Group stage			
1988	(Iraq) Ammo Baba	Group stage	Iraq 2–0 Saudi Arabia	Win	Radhi 13', 35'
1988	(Iraq) Ammo Baba	Group stage	Iraq 0–0 Egypt	Draw	
1988	(Iraq) Ammo Baba	Semi-finals			
1988	(Iraq) Ammo Baba	Semi-finals	Iraq 3–0 Jordan	Win	Radhi 22', Abed Ali 45', Mohammed 80'
1988	(Iraq) Ammo Baba	Final			
1988	(Iraq) Ammo Baba	Final	Iraq 1–1 (a.e.t.) (4–3 p) Syria	Draw	Gorgis 34'
2012	(Brazil) Zico	Group stage			
2012	(Brazil) Zico	Group stage	Iraq 1–0 Lebanon	Win	Karim 89'
2012	(Brazil) Zico	Group stage	Iraq 2–1 Egypt	Win	Karim 49', Abdul-Zahra 75'
2012	(Brazil) Zico	Group stage	Iraq 1–1 Sudan	Draw	Shaker 5'
2012	(Brazil) Zico	Semi-finals			
2012	(Brazil) Zico	Semi-finals	Iraq 1–2 Morocco	Loss	Karim 90+6' (pen.)
2012	(Brazil) Zico	Third place match			
2012	(Brazil) Zico	Third place match	Iraq 1–0 Saudi Arabia	Win	Abdul-Zahra 16'
2021	(Montenegro) Željko Petrović	Group stage			
2021	(Montenegro) Željko Petrović	Group stage	Iraq 1–1 Oman	Draw	Abdulkareem 90+8' (pen.)
2021	(Montenegro) Željko Petrović	Group stage	Iraq 0–0 Bahrain	Draw	
2021	(Montenegro) Željko Petrović	Group stage	Iraq 0–3 Qatar	Loss	
2025	(Australia) Graham Arnold	Group stage			
2025	(Australia) Graham Arnold	Group stage	Iraq 2–1 Bahrain	Win	Lutfalla 10' (o.g.), Ali 25'
2025	(Australia) Graham Arnold	Group stage	Iraq 2–0 Sudan	Win	Ali 81', Attwan 84'
2025	(Australia) Graham Arnold	Group stage	Iraq 0–2 Algeria	Loss	
2025	(Australia) Graham Arnold	Quarter-finals			
2025	(Australia) Graham Arnold	Quarter-finals	Iraq 0–1 Jordan	Loss	
First match: Iraq 1–0 Kuwait – 13 November 1964, Shuwaikh High School Stadium, Kuwait City, Kuwait; Biggest win: Iraq 10–1 Bahrain – 5 April 1966, Al-Kashafa Stadium, Baghdad, Iraq; Biggest defeat: Iraq 0–3 Qatar – 6 December 2021, Al Bayt Stadium, Al Khor, Qatar; Best finish: Champions (1964, 1966, 1985, 1988); Worst finish: Group stage (2021); Overall top scorer: Hisham Atta (6 goals); Most goals in a single tournament: Nouri Dhiab (5 goals, 1966); Draws include knockout matches decided via penalty shoot-out.

==== Arabian Gulf Cup ====
Arabian Gulf Cup record
Year	Result	Pld	W	D*	L	GF	GA	Squad
1970 to 1974	Did not enter							
1976	Runners-up	7	4	2	1	23	8	Squad
1979	Champions	6	6	0	0	23	1	Squad
1982	Withdrew	5	4	1	0	11	2	Squad
1984	Champions	7	4	2	1	12	5	Squad
1986	Sixth place	6	1	3	2	8	9	Squad
1988	Champions	6	4	2	0	8	1	Squad
1990	Withdrew	3	1	2	0	4	3	Squad
1992 to 2003–04	Banned due to Gulf War							
2004	Group stage	3	0	2	1	5	7	Squad
2007	Group stage	3	1	1	1	2	2	Squad
2009	Group stage	3	0	1	2	2	8	Squad
2010	Semi-finals	4	1	3	0	5	4	Squad
2013	Runners-up	5	3	1	1	7	3	Squad
2014	Group stage	3	0	1	2	1	4	Squad
2017–18	Semi-finals	4	2	2	0	6	2	Squad
2019	Semi-finals	4	2	2	0	6	3	Squad
2023	Champions	5	4	1	0	12	3	Squad
2024–25	Group stage	3	1	0	2	2	5	Squad
2026	Group stage	3	1	1	1	4	5	Squad
2028	To be determined							
Total	4 Titles	80	39	27	14	141	75	—

Arabian Gulf Cup history
Year	Manager	Round	Score	Result	Goalscorers for Iraq
1976	(Scotland) Danny McLennan	Round-robin			
1976	(Scotland) Danny McLennan	Round-robin	Iraq 4–0 Oman	Win	Hassan 33', Kadhim 68', 80', Nasser 69' (o.g.)
1976	(Scotland) Danny McLennan	Round-robin	Iraq 4–1 Bahrain	Win	Waal 11', Hassan 23', Abdul-Jalil 50', Kadhim 65'
1976	(Scotland) Danny McLennan	Round-robin	Iraq 7–1 Saudi Arabia	Win	Waal 3', Abdul-Jalil 6', Hassan 25', Kadhim 45', 60', 68', Subhi 89'
1976	(Scotland) Danny McLennan	Round-robin	Iraq 0–0 Qatar	Draw	
1976	(Scotland) Danny McLennan	Round-robin	Iraq 4–0 (United Arab Emirates) UAE	Win	A. H. Mahmoud 11', Kadhim 34' (pen.), Abdul-Jalil 43', Fartous 44'
1976	(Scotland) Danny McLennan	Round-robin	Iraq 2–2 Kuwait	Draw	Abdul-Jalil 46', Kadhim 49'
1976	(Scotland) Danny McLennan	Championship play-off			
1976	(Scotland) Danny McLennan	Championship play-off	Iraq 2–4 Kuwait	Loss	Subhi 9', 50'
1979	(Iraq) Ammo Baba	Round-robin			
1979	(Iraq) Ammo Baba	Round-robin	Iraq 4–0 Bahrain	Win	Saeed 48', 88', 90', N. Shaker 64'
1979	(Iraq) Ammo Baba	Round-robin	Iraq 2–0 Qatar	Win	Saeed 1', 60' (pen.)
1979	(Iraq) Ammo Baba	Round-robin	Iraq 3–1 Kuwait	Win	Hassan 9', Hadi Ahmed 47', Abdul-Sahib 90'
1979	(Iraq) Ammo Baba	Round-robin	Iraq 5–0 (United Arab Emirates) UAE	Win	Hadi Ahmed 25', Abdul-Sahib 40', Hassan 49', Saeed 66', Khudhair 85'
1979	(Iraq) Ammo Baba	Round-robin	Iraq 7–0 Oman	Win	Saeed 30', 32', 40', 86', Hassan 43', 50', Khudhair 52'
1979	(Iraq) Ammo Baba	Round-robin	Iraq 2–0 Saudi Arabia	Win	Hassan 24', H. Farhan 36'
1982	(Iraq) Ammo Baba	Round-robin (withdrew)			
1982	(Iraq) Ammo Baba	Round-robin (withdrew)	Iraq 4–0 Oman	Win	Saeed 24', Dirjal 32', 90', H. Farhan 75'
1982	(Iraq) Ammo Baba	Round-robin (withdrew)	Iraq 3–0 Bahrain	Win	Aziz 41', Saeed 84', 88'
1982	(Iraq) Ammo Baba	Round-robin (withdrew)	Iraq 1–1 Saudi Arabia	Draw	Saeed 84'
1982	(Iraq) Ammo Baba	Round-robin (withdrew)	Iraq 2–1 Qatar	Win	H. Mohammed 20', 29'
1982	(Iraq) Ammo Baba	Round-robin (withdrew)	Iraq 1–0 (United Arab Emirates) UAE	Win	Saeed 49'
1984	(Iraq) Ammo Baba	Round-robin			
1984	(Iraq) Ammo Baba	Round-robin	Iraq 2–1 Oman	Win	Saeed 25', 29'
1984	(Iraq) Ammo Baba	Round-robin	Iraq 0–0 (United Arab Emirates) UAE	Draw	
1984	(Iraq) Ammo Baba	Round-robin	Iraq 4–0 Saudi Arabia	Win	N. Shaker 25', Saeed 57', 70', 84'
1984	(Iraq) Ammo Baba	Round-robin	Iraq 1–0 Bahrain	Win	Hashim 66'
1984	(Iraq) Ammo Baba	Round-robin	Iraq 3–1 Kuwait	Win	Saeed 47', 75', Allawi 80'
1984	(Iraq) Ammo Baba	Round-robin	Iraq 1–2 Qatar	Loss	Radhi 55'
1984	(Iraq) Ammo Baba	Championship play-off			
1984	(Iraq) Ammo Baba	Championship play-off	Iraq 1–1 (a.e.t.) (3–2 p) Qatar	Draw	Dirjal 102'
1986	(Brazil) Zé Mário	Round-robin			
1986	(Brazil) Zé Mário	Round-robin	Iraq 0–0 Bahrain	Draw	
1986	(Brazil) Zé Mário	Round-robin	Iraq 2–2 (United Arab Emirates) UAE	Draw	Saddam 26', M. Hussein 62'
1986	(Brazil) Zé Mário	Round-robin	Iraq 1–1 Qatar	Draw	Jafar 61'
1986	(Brazil) Zé Mário	Round-robin	Iraq 1–2 Saudi Arabia	Loss	Saddam 75'
1986	(Brazil) Zé Mário	Round-robin	Iraq 1–2 Kuwait	Loss	Jassim 74'
1986	(Brazil) Zé Mário	Round-robin	Iraq 3–2 Oman	Win	Hameed 27', 58', 89'
1988	(Iraq) Ammo Baba	Round-robin			
1988	(Iraq) Ammo Baba	Round-robin	Iraq 1–1 Oman	Draw	Shihab 50'
1988	(Iraq) Ammo Baba	Round-robin	Iraq 1–0 Kuwait	Win	Radhi 39'
1988	(Iraq) Ammo Baba	Round-robin	Iraq 0–0 (United Arab Emirates) UAE	Draw	
1988	(Iraq) Ammo Baba	Round-robin	Iraq 3–0 Qatar	Win	Jafar 58', Radhi 80', 81'
1988	(Iraq) Ammo Baba	Round-robin	Iraq 2–0 Saudi Arabia	Win	Radhi 59', Gorgis 72'
1988	(Iraq) Ammo Baba	Round-robin	Iraq 1–0 Bahrain	Win	L. Hussein 49'
1990	(Iraq) Anwar Jassam	Round-robin (withdrew)			
1990	(Iraq) Anwar Jassam	Round-robin (withdrew)	Iraq 1–0 Bahrain	Win	Jafar 39'
1990	(Iraq) Anwar Jassam	Round-robin (withdrew)	Iraq 1–1 Kuwait	Draw	L. Hussein 67'
1990	(Iraq) Anwar Jassam	Round-robin (withdrew)	Iraq 2–2 (United Arab Emirates) UAE	Draw	Radhi 25', Qais 88' (pen.)
2004	(Iraq) Adnan Hamad	Group stage			
2004	(Iraq) Adnan Hamad	Group stage	Iraq 1–3 Oman	Loss	R. Farhan 56'
2004	(Iraq) Adnan Hamad	Group stage	Iraq 3–3 Qatar	Draw	R. Farhan 16', Akram 54', Abdul-Amir 90+2'
2004	(Iraq) Adnan Hamad	Group stage	Iraq 1–1 (United Arab Emirates) UAE	Draw	Munir 90+2' (pen.)
2007	(Iraq) Akram Salman	Group stage			
2007	(Iraq) Akram Salman	Group stage	Iraq 1–0 Qatar	Win	H. M. Mohammed 39'
2007	(Iraq) Akram Salman	Group stage	Iraq 1–1 Bahrain	Draw	H. M. Mohammed 11'
2007	(Iraq) Akram Salman	Group stage	Iraq 0–1 Saudi Arabia	Loss	
2009	(Brazil) Jorvan Vieira	Group stage			
2009	(Brazil) Jorvan Vieira	Group stage	Iraq 1–3 Bahrain	Loss	Y. Mahmoud 81' (pen.)
2009	(Brazil) Jorvan Vieira	Group stage	Iraq 0–4 Oman	Loss	
2009	(Brazil) Jorvan Vieira	Group stage	Iraq 1–1 Kuwait	Draw	Abdul-Zahra 66'
2010	(Germany) Wolfgang Sidka	Group stage			
2010	(Germany) Wolfgang Sidka	Group stage	Iraq 0–0 (United Arab Emirates) UAE	Draw	
2010	(Germany) Wolfgang Sidka	Group stage	Iraq 3–2 Bahrain	Win	Abdul-Zahra 24', 57', H. M. Mohammed 90'
2010	(Germany) Wolfgang Sidka	Group stage	Iraq 0–0 Oman	Draw	
2010	(Germany) Wolfgang Sidka	Semi-finals			
2010	(Germany) Wolfgang Sidka	Semi-finals	Iraq 2–2 (a.e.t.) (4–5 p) Kuwait	Draw	H. M. Mohammed 6', Abdul-Zahra 14'
2013	(Iraq) Hakeem Shaker	Group stage			
2013	(Iraq) Hakeem Shaker	Group stage	Iraq 2–0 Saudi Arabia	Win	S. Shaker 18', Hawsawi 72' (o.g.)
2013	(Iraq) Hakeem Shaker	Group stage	Iraq 1–0 Kuwait	Win	Hammadi Ahmed 29'
2013	(Iraq) Hakeem Shaker	Group stage	Iraq 2–0 Yemen	Win	D. Ismail 16', Hammadi Ahmed 36'
2013	(Iraq) Hakeem Shaker	Semi-finals			
2013	(Iraq) Hakeem Shaker	Semi-finals	Iraq 1–1 (a.e.t.) (4–2 p) Bahrain	Draw	Y. Mahmoud 18'
2013	(Iraq) Hakeem Shaker	Final			
2013	(Iraq) Hakeem Shaker	Final	Iraq 1–2 (a.e.t.) (United Arab Emirates) UAE	Loss	Y. Mahmoud 81'
2014	(Iraq) Hakeem Shaker	Group stage			
2014	(Iraq) Hakeem Shaker	Group stage	Iraq 0–1 Kuwait	Loss	
2014	(Iraq) Hakeem Shaker	Group stage	Iraq 1–1 Oman	Draw	Kasim 14'
2014	(Iraq) Hakeem Shaker	Group stage	Iraq 0–2 (United Arab Emirates) UAE	Loss	
2017–18	(Iraq) Basim Qasim	Group stage			
2017–18	(Iraq) Basim Qasim	Group stage	Iraq 1–1 Bahrain	Draw	Abdul-Raheem 89'
2017–18	(Iraq) Basim Qasim	Group stage	Iraq 2–1 Qatar	Win	Faez 45+1', Husni 65'
2017–18	(Iraq) Basim Qasim	Group stage	Iraq 3–0 Yemen	Win	Husni 54', Faez 64' (pen.), Kamil 80'
2017–18	(Iraq) Basim Qasim	Semi-finals			
2017–18	(Iraq) Basim Qasim	Semi-finals	Iraq 0–0 (a.e.t.) (2–4 p) (United Arab Emirates) UAE	Draw	
2019	(Slovenia) Srečko Katanec	Group stage			
2019	(Slovenia) Srečko Katanec	Group stage	Iraq 2–1 Qatar	Win	Qasim 19', 27'
2019	(Slovenia) Srečko Katanec	Group stage	Iraq 2–0 (United Arab Emirates) UAE	Win	Abbas 6', Abdul-Zahra 37'
2019	(Slovenia) Srečko Katanec	Group stage	Iraq 0–0 Yemen	Draw	
2019	(Slovenia) Srečko Katanec	Semi-finals			
2019	(Slovenia) Srečko Katanec	Semi-finals	Iraq 2–2 (a.e.t.) (3–5 p) Bahrain	Draw	M. Ali 6', Bayesh 18'
2023	(Spain) Jesús Casas	Group stage			
2023	(Spain) Jesús Casas	Group stage	Iraq 0–0 Oman	Draw	
2023	(Spain) Jesús Casas	Group stage	Iraq 2–0 Saudi Arabia	Win	Bayesh 30', Rostam 86'
2023	(Spain) Jesús Casas	Group stage	Iraq 5–0 Yemen	Win	Nadhim 40', Attwan 64', A. Hussein 74' (pen.), 75', H. Ali 88'
2023	(Spain) Jesús Casas	Semi-finals			
2023	(Spain) Jesús Casas	Semi-finals	Iraq 2–1 Qatar	Win	Bayesh 19', A. Hussein 43'
2023	(Spain) Jesús Casas	Final			
2023	(Spain) Jesús Casas	Final	Iraq 3–2 (a.e.t.) Oman	Win	Bayesh 24', Attwan 116' (pen.), Younis 120+2'
2024–25	(Spain) Jesús Casas	Group stage			
2024–25	(Spain) Jesús Casas	Group stage	Iraq 1–0 Yemen	Win	A. Hussein 64'
2024–25	(Spain) Jesús Casas	Group stage	Iraq 0–2 Bahrain	Loss	
2024–25	(Spain) Jesús Casas	Group stage	Iraq 1–3 Saudi Arabia	Loss	M. Ali 64'
2026	(Australia) Graham Arnold	Group stage			
2026	(Australia) Graham Arnold	Group stage	Iraq 1–1 Oman	Draw	Qasim 6'
2026	(Australia) Graham Arnold	Group stage	Iraq 3–2 Kuwait	Win	Iqbal 52', Rasheed 83', Nabeel 90+9'
2026	(Australia) Graham Arnold	Group stage	Iraq 0–2 Saudi Arabia	Loss	
First match: Iraq 4–0 Oman – 27 March 1976, Khalifa Sports City Stadium, Doha, Qatar; Biggest win: Iraq 7–0 Oman – 6 April 1979, Al-Shaab Stadium, Baghdad, Iraq; Biggest defeat: Iraq 0–4 Oman – 7 January 2009, Sultan Qaboos Sports Complex, Muscat, Oman; Best finish: Champions (1979, 1984, 1988, 2023); Worst finish: Group stage (2004, 2007, 2009, 2014, 2024–25, 2026), Sixth place (1986); Overall top scorer: Hussein Saeed (22 goals); Most goals in a single tournament: Hussein Saeed (10 goals, 1979); Draws include knockout matches decided via penalty shoot-out.

==== West Asian Games ====
West Asian Games record
Year	Result	Pld	W	D*	L	GF	GA
1997 to 2002	Did not enter						
2005	Gold medalists	4	3	1	0	13	3
Total	1 Title	4	3	1	0	13	3

West Asian Games history
Year	Manager	Round	Score	Result	Goalscorers for Iraq
2005	(Iraq) Akram Salman	Group stage			
2005	(Iraq) Akram Salman	Group stage	Iraq 4–0 Palestine	Win	Farhan 4', H. M. Mohammed 56', L. Salah 73', A. Salah 86'
2005	(Iraq) Akram Salman	Group stage	Iraq 5–1 Saudi Arabia	Win	Abdul-Amir 8', E. Mohammed 19', Akram 30', Mahmoud 51', 78'
2005	(Iraq) Akram Salman	Semi-finals			
2005	(Iraq) Akram Salman	Semi-finals	Iraq 2–0 Saudi Arabia	Win	L. Salah 33', Farhan 85'
2005	(Iraq) Akram Salman	Final			
2005	(Iraq) Akram Salman	Final	Iraq 2–2 (a.e.t.) (4–3 p) Syria	Draw	Farhan 45', Mahmoud 78'
First match: Iraq 4–0 Palestine – 1 December 2005, Ahmed bin Ali Stadium, Al Rayyan, Qatar; Biggest win: Iraq 4–0 Palestine – 1 December 2005 and Iraq 5–1 Saudi Arabia – 5 December 2005; Biggest defeat: None; Best finish: Gold medalists (2005); Worst finish: Gold medalists (2005); Overall top scorer: Razzaq Farhan and Younis Mahmoud (3 goals); Most goals in a single tournament: 3 goals — Razzaq Farhan (2005), Younis Mahmoud (2005); Draws include knockout matches decided via penalty shoot-out.

==== Arab Games ====
Arab Games record
Year	Result	Pld	W	D*	L	GF	GA	Squad
1953	Did not enter							
1957	Group stage	3	1	1	1	8	8	Squad
1961	Did not enter							
1965	Group stage	4	1	2	1	7	2	Squad
1976	Did not enter							
1985	Gold medalists	4	4	0	0	7	1	Squad
1992 to 1997	Banned due to Gulf War							
1999	Silver medalists	7	4	1	2	17	9	Squad
2007	Did not enter							
2011	Group stage	2	0	1	1	0	3	Squad
2023 to present	See Iraq national under-23 football team							
Total	1 Title	20	10	5	5	39	23	—

Arab Games history
Year	Manager	Round	Score	Result	Goalscorers for Iraq
1957	(Iraq) Ismail Mohammed	Group stage			
1957	(Iraq) Ismail Mohammed	Group stage	Iraq 3–3 Morocco	Draw	Baba 48', Eshaya 50', Salman 63'
1957	(Iraq) Ismail Mohammed	Group stage	Iraq 2–4 Tunisia	Loss	Abbas 52' (pen.), David 80'
1957	(Iraq) Ismail Mohammed	Group stage	Iraq 3–1 Libya	Win	Abdul-Majid 25', Baba 31', Eshaya 71'
1965	(Iraq) Shawqi Aboud	Group stage			
1965	(Iraq) Shawqi Aboud	Group stage	Iraq 6–0 Aden	Win	Baba 9', 48', Hameed 32', 77', Atta 78', 80'
1965	(Iraq) Shawqi Aboud	Group stage	Iraq 0–0 Lebanon	Draw	
1965	(Iraq) Shawqi Aboud	Group stage	Iraq 1–1 Palestine	Draw	Dawood 54'
1965	(Iraq) Shawqi Aboud	Group stage	Iraq 0–1 United Arab Republic	Loss	
1985	(Iraq) Anwar Jassam	Group stage			
1985	(Iraq) Anwar Jassam	Group stage	Iraq 2–0 Libya	Win	Radhi, Abid
1985	(Iraq) Anwar Jassam	Group stage	Iraq 2–0 Syria	Win	S. Mahmoud 60', Allawi 88'
1985	(Iraq) Anwar Jassam	Semi-finals			
1985	(Iraq) Anwar Jassam	Semi-finals	Iraq 2–1 Saudi Arabia	Win	Radhi 60', 78'
1985	(Iraq) Anwar Jassam	Final			
1985	(Iraq) Anwar Jassam	Final	Iraq 1–0 Morocco	Win	Gorgis 8'
1999	(Iraq) Najeh Humoud	First round			
1999	(Iraq) Najeh Humoud	First round	Iraq 2–0 Bahrain	Win	Fawzi 5', H. Mahmoud 35'
1999	(Iraq) Najeh Humoud	First round	Iraq 0–2 Libya	Loss	
1999	(Iraq) Najeh Humoud	Second group stage			
1999	(Iraq) Najeh Humoud	Second group stage	Iraq 3–0 Oman	Win	Fawzi 4', 54' (pen.), Farhan 42'
1999	(Iraq) Najeh Humoud	Second group stage	Iraq 1–2 Jordan	Loss	Mohammed 87'
1999	(Iraq) Najeh Humoud	Second group stage	Iraq 4–0 Lebanon	Win	Mohammed 7', 54', Rahim 59', Abu Al-Hail 88'
1999	(Iraq) Najeh Humoud	Semi-finals			
1999	(Iraq) Najeh Humoud	Semi-finals	Iraq 3–1 Libya	Win	Jafar 3', Fawzi 18', Hamad 32'
1999	(Iraq) Najeh Humoud	Final			
1999	(Iraq) Najeh Humoud	Final	Iraq 4–4 (a.e.t.) (1–3 p) Jordan	Draw	Fawzi 73', 75' (pen.), H. Mahmoud 78', Farhan 87'
2011	(Brazil) Zico	Group stage			
2011	(Brazil) Zico	Group stage	Iraq 0–3 Bahrain	Loss	
2011	(Brazil) Zico	Group stage	Iraq 0–0 Qatar	Draw	
2023–present
2023–present	See Iraq national under-23 football team				
First match: Iraq 3–3 Morocco – 19 October 1957, Beirut, Lebanon; Biggest win: Iraq 6–0 Aden – 4 September 1965, Cairo, United Arab Republic; Biggest defeat: Iraq 0–3 Bahrain – 13 December 2011, Jassim bin Hamad Stadium, Al Rayyan, Qatar; Best finish: Gold medalists (1985); Worst finish: Group stage (1957, 1965, 2011); Overall top scorer: Hussam Fawzi (6 goals); Most goals in a single tournament: Hussam Fawzi (6 goals, 1999); Draws include knockout matches decided via penalty shoot-out.

=== Minor tournaments ===
Minor tournaments
Tournament	Round	GP	W	D*	L	GS	GA
(Libya) 1966 Tripoli Fair Tournament	Runners-up	4	2	0	2	5	3
(Libya) 1967 Tripoli Fair Tournament	Champions	3	2	1	0	7	3
(Iran) 1969 Friendship Cup	Fifth place	4	0	0	4	2	7
(Iraq) 1972 Palestine Cup	Runners-up	5	3	1	1	10	5
(Libya) 1973 Palestine Cup	Fourth place	6	2	3	1	5	3
(Tunisia) 1975 Palestine Cup	Runners-up	4	2	1	1	10	2
(Malaysia) 1977 Merdeka Tournament	Runners-up	7	3	3	1	11	2
(Malaysia) 1978 Merdeka Tournament	Runners-up	8	5	1	2	12	6
(Malaysia) 1981 Merdeka Tournament	Champions	6	4	1	1	16	4
(Singapore) 1984 Merlion Cup	Champions	5	4	1	0	10	3
(South Korea) 1985 President's Cup	Fourth place	8	3	2	3	19	12
(South Korea) 1988 President's Cup	Quarter-finals	4	3	0	1	8	4
(Kuwait) 1989 Peace and Friendship Cup	Champions	5	2	2	1	9	5
1992 Jordan Tournament	Runners-up	5	4	0	1	20	2
(India) 1995 Nehru Cup	Champions	5	3	2	0	8	3
(Malaysia) 1995 Merdeka Tournament	Champions	4	3	1	0	7	3
(India) 1997 Nehru Cup	Champions	6	5	1	0	14	3
(United Arab Emirates) 1999 Friendship Tournament	Champions	3	1	2	0	6	3
(China) 2000 Four Nations Tournament	Runners-up	2	1	0	1	3	4
(Iran) 2003 LG Cup	Runners-up	2	1	0	1	3	5
(Bahrain) 2003 Prime Minister's Cup	Runners-up	3	1	1	1	4	4
(United Arab Emirates) 2009 UAE Cup	Champions	2	2	0	0	2	0
(Jordan) 2011 Fuchs Tournament	Fourth place	2	0	1	1	1	3
(Iraq) 2018 IFC	Third place	2	0	1	1	3	4
(Saudi Arabia) 2018 Superclásico Championship	Fourth place	2	0	1	1	1	5
(Iraq) 2019 IFC	Champions	2	2	0	0	4	2
2022 Jordan Tournament	Third place	2	1	1	0	2	1
(Thailand) 2023 King's Cup	Champions	2	0	2	0	4	4
2023 Jordan Tournament	Third place	2	0	2	0	2	2
(Thailand) 2025 King's Cup	Champions	2	2	0	0	3	1
(Iraq) 2026 Basra Tournament	Runners-up	2	0	2	0	1	1

== Head-to-head record ==
The list below shows the Iraq national football team's all-time international record against opposing nations at a senior level.

Key

Positive balance (more wins than losses)
Neutral balance (as many wins as losses)
Negative balance (more losses than wins)

As of 17 November 2026 after match against Iran

- Draws include Penalty shoot-outs
- Countries that are in italics are now defunct

Iraq national football team head-to-head records
Team	Confederation	First	GP	W	D	L	GF	GA	GD
Afghanistan	AFC	1975	2	2	0	0	7	1	+6
Algeria	CAF	1973	8	3	4	1	8	4	+4
Andorra	UEFA	2026	1	1	0	0	1	0	+1
Argentina	CONMEBOL	2018	1	0	0	1	0	4	−4
Australia	AFC	1973	11	2	2	7	8	14	−6
Azerbaijan	UEFA	2009	1	1	0	0	1	0	+1
Bahrain	AFC	1966	43	21	16	6	73	35	+38
Belgium	UEFA	1986	1	0	0	1	1	2	−1
Bolivia	CONMEBOL	2018	2	1	1	0	2	1	+1
Botswana	CAF	2012	1	0	1	0	1	1	0
Brazil	CONMEBOL	2012	1	0	0	1	0	6	−6
Cambodia	AFC	2019	2	2	0	0	8	1	+7
Cameroon	CAF	1984	1	0	0	1	0	1	−1
Canada	CONCACAF	1984	2	1	1	0	7	2	+5
Chile	CONMEBOL	2013	1	0	0	1	0	6	−6
China	AFC	1974	21	11	3	7	27	22	+5
Chinese Taipei	AFC	2004	4	4	0	0	17	3	+14
Colombia	CONMEBOL	2023	1	0	0	1	0	1	−1
Congo	CAF	1992	1	1	0	0	3	0	+3
Costa Rica	CONCACAF	1980	1	1	0	0	3	0	+3
Cyprus	UEFA	2005	1	0	0	1	1	2	−1
Denmark	UEFA	1986	2	1	0	1	2	2	0
DR Congo	CAF	2015	2	2	0	0	3	1	+2
East Germany	UEFA	1967	9	1	6	2	7	15	−8
Ecuador	CONMEBOL	2022	1	0	1	0	0	0	0
Egypt	CAF	1965	13	2	5	6	7	13	−6
Estonia	UEFA	1999	1	0	1	0	1	1	0
Ethiopia	CAF	1992	1	1	0	0	13	0	+13
Finland	UEFA	1979	3	2	1	0	3	0	+3
France	UEFA	2026	1	0	0	1	0	3	−3
Guatemala	CONCACAF	1988	1	1	0	0	3	0	+3
Guinea	CAF	1989	1	0	0	1	0	1	−1
Hong Kong	AFC	2019	3	3	0	0	5	1	+4
India	AFC	1974	7	4	3	0	13	4	+9
Indonesia	AFC	1968	13	10	2	1	31	8	+23
Iran	AFC	1962	32	6	8	18	22	44	−22
Italy	UEFA	1988	1	0	0	1	0	2	−2
Japan	AFC	1978	14	4	3	7	12	20	−8
Jordan	AFC	1964	57	31	14	12	91	54	+37
Kazakhstan	UEFA	1997	4	0	2	2	4	7	−3
Kenya	CAF	2003	2	2	0	0	4	1	+2
Kyrgyzstan	AFC	1999	2	2	0	0	9	1	+8
Kuwait	AFC	1964	44	19	13	12	59	48	+11
Liberia	CAF	2013	1	0	0	1	0	1	−1
Lebanon	AFC	1959	28	16	10	2	51	11	+40
Libya	CAF	1957	15	10	3	2	25	9	+16
Macau	AFC	2001	2	2	0	0	13	0	+13
Malaysia	AFC	1974	8	5	3	0	14	3	+11
Mauritania	CAF	1985	1	1	0	0	2	0	+2
Mexico	CONCACAF	1986	2	0	0	2	0	5	−5
Moldova	UEFA	1992	1	1	0	0	1	0	+1
Morocco	CAF	1957	10	2	5	3	10	9	+1
Myanmar	AFC	1977	4	4	0	0	13	1	+12
North Korea	AFC	1971	11	6	1	4	11	9	+2
Norway	UEFA	2026	1	0	0	1	1	4	−3
Nepal	AFC	1982	4	4	0	0	22	5	+17
New Zealand	OFC	1973	3	2	1	0	6	0	+6
Oman	AFC	1976	32	15	11	6	52	26	+26
Pakistan	AFC	1969	9	7	1	1	40	6	+34
Paraguay	CONMEBOL	1986	1	0	0	1	0	1	−1
Palestine	AFC	1965	19	14	4	1	40	9	+31
Peru	CONMEBOL	2014	1	0	0	1	0	2	−2
Philippines	AFC	2024	2	2	0	0	6	0	+6
Poland	UEFA	1970	5	1	2	2	3	7	−4
Qatar	AFC	1975	41	17	10	14	51	45	+6
Romania	UEFA	1986	2	0	2	0	1	1	0
Russia	UEFA	2023	1	0	0	1	0	2	−2
Saudi Arabia	AFC	1975	45	18	12	15	63	45	+18
Senegal	CAF	2026	1	0	0	1	0	5	−5
Sierra Leone	CAF	2012	1	1	0	0	1	0	+1
Singapore	AFC	1978	6	5	0	1	20	5	+15
South Africa	CAF	2009	1	0	1	0	0	0	0
South Korea	AFC	1972	26	2	12	12	17	34	−17
South Yemen	AFC	1965	6	5	0	1	18	4	+14
Spain	UEFA	2009	2	0	1	1	1	2	−1
Sri Lanka	CAF	1971	1	1	0	0	5	0	+5
Sudan	CAF	1967	3	1	2	0	5	3	0
Syria	AFC	1966	34	18	11	5	47	25	+22
Tajikistan	AFC	1997	3	2	1	0	7	2	+5
Thailand	AFC	1968	22	13	6	3	55	23	+32
Trinidad and Tobago	CONCACAF	2004	1	0	0	1	0	2	−2
Tunisia	CAF	1957	10	2	3	5	10	14	−4
Turkey	UEFA	1959	3	0	1	2	3	10	−7
Turkmenistan	AFC	1999	2	2	0	0	6	2	+4
Uganda	CAF	1977	3	1	2	0	3	2	+1
United Arab Emirates	AFC	1973	38	14	16	8	55	36	+19
Uruguay	CONMEBOL	2003	1	0	0	1	2	5	−3
Uzbekistan	AFC	2000	11	3	3	5	8	10	−2
Venezuela	CONMEBOL	2026	1	0	0	1	0	2	−2
Vietnam	AFC	2007	7	6	1	0	14	6	+8
Yemen	AFC	1993	15	12	3	0	36	7	+29
Yugoslavia	UEFA	1980	2	0	1	1	3	5	−2
Zambia	CAF	1988	2	1	1	0	5	3	+2
Total			772	358	217	197	1,203	740	+463

== FIFA Rankings ==
Last update was on 19 November 2025.

Best Ranking Worst Ranking Best Mover Worst Mover

Iraq's FIFA World Ranking
Rank	Year	Games Played	Best		Worst	
Rank	Year	Games Played	Rank	Move	Rank	Move
58	2025	14	57	▲1	59	▼3
56	2024	18	55	▲4	59	▼1
63	2023	14	63	▲5	70	▼2
68	2022	11	68	▲2	74	▼0
75	2021	17	68	▲1	75	▼3
69	2020	2	69	▲1	70	▼0
70	2019	22	70	▲8	80	▼2
88	2018	12	82	▲2	91	▼5
79	2017	14	79	▲17	122	▼3
119	2016	12	87	▲15	128	▼15
89	2015	16	82	▲20	114	▼11
103	2014	11	81	▲15	115	▼23
110	2013	19	89	▲3	110	▼6
92	2012	20	70	▲6	97	▼17
78	2011	20	78	▲16	109	▼13
100	2010	15	80	▲13	107	▼24
88	2009	13	77	▲9	100	▼17
72	2008	12	58	▲15	77	▼18
68	2007	20	64	▲16	84	▼5
83	2006	14	52	▲5	92	▼36
54	2005	10	44	▲20	74	▼11
44	2004	21	39	▲3	45	▼6
43	2003	12	43	▲23	75	▼13
53	2002	10	50	▲9	72	▼3
72	2001	18	69	▲16	85	▼4
79	2000	11	78	▲9	89	▼8
78	1999	13	78	▲16	108	▼5
94	1998	1	70	▲7	101	▼13
68	1997	9	68	▲13	98	▼2
98	1996	7	98	▲31	139	▼15
110	1995	3	76	▲26	110	▼28
88	1994	0	61	▲4	88	▼8
65	1993	15	57	▲25	66	▼5

View source data.

== Honours ==
This is a list of honours for the senior Iraq national team

Iraq's starting line-up against Saudi Arabia in the 2007 AFC Asian Cup Final, a match they won 1–0.

=== Continental ===
- AFC Asian Cup
  - (gold) Champions (1): 2007
- Asian Games
  - (gold) Gold medal (1): 1982

=== Regional ===
- WAFF Championship
  - (gold) Champions (1): 2002
  - (silver) Runners-up (3): 2007, 2012, 2019
  - (bronze) Third place (1): 2000
- Arab Cup
  - (gold) Champions (4): 1964, 1966, 1985, 1988 (record)
  - (bronze) Third place (1): 2012
- Arabian Gulf Cup
  - (gold) Champions (4): 1979, 1984, 1988, 2023
  - (silver) Runners-up (2): 1976, 2013
- West Asian Games
  - (gold) Gold medal (1): 2005 (joint record)
- Arab Games
  - (gold) Gold medal (1): 1985
  - (silver) Silver medal (1): 1999

=== Friendly ===
- Merdeka Tournament
  - (gold) Winners: 1981, 1995
  - (silver) Runners-up: 1977, 1978
- Nehru Cup
  - (gold) Winners: 1995, 1997
- King's Cup
  - (gold) Winners: 2023, 2025
- Tripoli Fair Tournament
  - (gold) Winners: 1967
  - (silver) Runners-up: 1966
- International Friendship Championship
  - (gold) Winners: 2019
  - (bronze) Third place: 2018
- Merlion Cup
  - (gold) Winners: 1984
- Peace and Friendship Cup
  - (gold) Winners: 1989
- UAE Four Nations Friendship Tournament
  - (gold) Winners: 1999
- UAE International Cup
  - (gold) Winners: 2009
- Palestine Cup
  - (silver) Runners-up: 1972, 1975
- Jordan International Tournament
  - (silver) Runners-up: 1992
  - (bronze) Third place: 2022, 2023
- Four Nations Tournament
  - (silver) Runners-up: 2000
- LG Cup
  - (silver) Runners-up: 2003
- Bahrain Prime Minister's Cup
  - (silver) Runners-up: 2003
- Basra International Tournament
  - (silver) Runners-up: 2026

=== Awards ===
- World Soccer Team of the Year: 2007
- AFC National Team of the Year: 2003, 2007

=== Summary ===
Competition	1st place, gold medalist(s)	2nd place, silver medalist(s)	3rd place, bronze medalist(s)	Total
AFC Asian Cup	1	0	0	1
Asian Games	1	0	0	1
WAFF Championship	1	3	1	5
Arab Cup	4	0	1	5
Arabian Gulf Cup	4	2	0	6
West Asian Games	1	0	0	1
Arab Games	1	1	0	2
Total	13	6	2	21

== See also ==
- Iraq national under-23 football team
- Iraq national under-20 football team
- Iraq national under-17 football team

Achievements
Preceded by 2004 Japan	Asian Champions; 2007 (1st title)	Succeeded by 2011 Japan
Awards
Preceded by South Korea	AFC Men's Team of the Year; 2003	Succeeded by Japan
Preceded by Australia	AFC Men's Team of the Year; 2007	Succeeded by Japan
