= Lebanon national football team results (1940–1989) =

This is a list of the Lebanon national football team results from 1940 to 1989.

Lebanon played its first official FIFA match in 1940, losing 5–1 to Mandatory Palestine. Lebanon hosted the 1957 Arab Games, finishing third. They participated in the 1963 and 1966 Arab Cups, achieving third and fourth places, respectively. Joining the AFC in 1964, Lebanon debuted in Asian Cup qualifiers in 1971 but were eliminated. Despite the civil war, they competed in the 1980 AFC Asian Cup qualifiers and the 1988 Arab Cup, with limited success.

== Results ==
Legend for encounters
R1	First round
R2	Second round
GS	Group stage
SF	Semi-final
3rd	Third place

=== 1940s ===
27 April 1940 Friendly	Mandatory Palestine	5–1	Lebanon	Jaffa, Palestine
16:00 UTC+3	Meitner 2'; Schneiderovitz 11' (pen.); Machlis 32'; Kaspi 40', 60'	Report	Cordahi 50'	Stadium: Maccabiah Stadium; Attendance: 10,000; Referee: John Blackwell (England)

26 April 1942 Friendly	Lebanon	1–2	Syria	Beirut, Lebanon
--:--	Abou Nader 30'			Stadium: AUB Stadium; Attendance: 3,000; Referee: Tringle (England)

4 May 1947 Friendly	Lebanon	1–4	Syria	Beirut, Lebanon
16:00 UTC+2	Vartivar (pen.)			Stadium: Beirut Municipal Stadium; Attendance: 6,000; Referee: Şazi Tezcan (Turkey)

18 May 1947 Friendly	Syria	1–0	Lebanon	Aleppo, Syria
--:--				Referee: Mohammad Badereddine (Syria)

=== 1950s ===
3 August 1953 1953 Pan Arab Games GS	Jordan	4–1	Lebanon	Alexandria, Egypt
19:30 UTC+2	Hekmat; Musa; Krikor		Abou Mrad	Stadium: Alexandria Stadium; Referee: Mostafa Kamel Mansour (Egypt)

6 August 1953 1953 Pan Arab Games GS	Syria	0–0	Lebanon	Alexandria, Egypt
--:--				Stadium: Alexandria Stadium; Referee: Ezzat Osmaoui (Egypt)

8 August 1953 1953 Pan Arab Games GS	Lebanon	9–1	Palestine	Alexandria, Egypt
--:--				Stadium: Alexandria Stadium; Referee: Jalal Kraytem (Egypt)

23 January 1955 Friendly	Lebanon	2–3	Bulgaria	Beirut, Lebanon
--:--	Nakouzi 11'; Souheil 62'			Stadium: Beirut Municipal Stadium

29 February 1956 Friendly	Lebanon	1–4	Hungary	Beirut, Lebanon
--:--	Tchaparian 60'			Stadium: Beirut Municipal Stadium; Referee: Joseph Nalbandian (Lebanon)

18 October 1957 1957 Pan Arab Games GS	Saudi Arabia	1–1	Lebanon	Beirut, Lebanon
--:--	Kayyal 30'		Abou Mrad 22'	Stadium: Camille Chamoun Sports City Stadium; Referee: Gruppi (France)

20 October 1957 1957 Pan Arab Games GS	Syria	1–1	Lebanon	Beirut, Lebanon
--:--	Mahmoud		Halabi	Stadium: Camille Chamoun Sports City Stadium; Referee: Gruppi (France)

22 October 1957 1957 Pan Arab Games GS	Lebanon	6–3	Jordan	Beirut, Lebanon
--:--	Tchaparian 10' (pen.), 20'; Altounian 22', 26'; Chehade 26'; Abou Mrad 78'		Adass; Musa	Stadium: Camille Chamoun Sports City Stadium; Referee: Abou Baker Al Azrak (Morocco)

24 October 1957 1957 Pan Arab Games SF	Tunisia	4–2	Lebanon	Beirut, Lebanon
--:--	Touati; Hénia		Chehade 22', 51'	Stadium: Camille Chamoun Sports City Stadium; Referee: Gruppi (France)

15 November 1959 1960 Olympics qualification	Lebanon	0–3	Iraq	Beirut, Lebanon
--:--			Baba 2', 70'; Abdullah 85'	Stadium: Camille Chamoun Sports City Stadium; Attendance: 8,000; Referee: Cezmi Başar (Turkey)

25 November 1959 1960 Olympics qualification	Iraq	8–0	Lebanon	Baghdad, Iraq
--:--	Baba 5', 27'; Abdullah 17', 40', 50', 85'; Salih 58', 88'			Stadium: Al-Kashafa Stadium

=== 1960s ===
27 August 1961 1961 Arab Games GS	Lebanon	2–3	Libya	Casablanca, Morocco
--:--

29 August 1961 1961 Arab Games GS	United Arab Republic	4–0	Lebanon	Casablanca, Morocco
--:--

31 August 1961 1961 Arab Games GS	Lebanon	4–1	Kuwait	Tétouan, Morocco
--:--

3 September 1961 1961 Arab Games GS	Morocco	1–0	Lebanon	Casablanca, Morocco
--:--

5 September 1961 1961 Arab Games GS	Lebanon	7–1	Saudi Arabia	Casablanca, Morocco
--:--

26 January 1962 Friendly	Kuwait	0–5	Lebanon	Shuwaikh, Kuwait
--:--			Abou Mrad 3'; Tchaparian 10', 55'; Altounian 35'; Chehade 52'	Stadium: Shuwaikh High School Stadium; Referee: Ahmad Mehanna (Kuwait)

29 January 1962 Friendly	Kuwait	0–3	Lebanon	Shuwaikh, Kuwait
--:--			Tchaparian 28', 55'; (o.g.)	Stadium: Shuwaikh High School Stadium; Referee: Mahmoud Al Khaweja (Kuwait)

31 March 1963 1963 Arab Cup GS	Lebanon	6–0	Kuwait	Beirut, Lebanon
--:--	Altounian 20', 89'; Tchaparian 27', 34', 69'; Chehade 28'			Stadium: Camille Chamoun Sports City Stadium; Attendance: 30,000; Referee: Vahdettin Afir (Turkey)

4 April 1963 1963 Arab Cup GS	Lebanon	2–3	Syria	Beirut, Lebanon
--:--	Abou Mrad 6'; Altounian 78'		16'; Agop 51'; 52'	Stadium: Camille Chamoun Sports City Stadium; Attendance: 7,000; Referee: Vahdettin Afir (Turkey)

6 April 1963 1963 Arab Cup GS	Lebanon	5–0	Jordan	Beirut, Lebanon
--:--	Abou Mrad 6'; Saad 30'; Altounian (pen.); Chehade			Stadium: Camille Chamoun Sports City Stadium; Referee: Vahdettin Afir (Turkey)

7 April 1963 1963 Arab Cup GS	Lebanon	0–1	Tunisia	Beirut, Lebanon
--:--			Itani 10' (o.g.)	Stadium: Camille Chamoun Sports City Stadium; Attendance: 35,000; Referee: Vahdettin Afir (Turkey)

6 June 1963 Friendly	Tunisia	2–4	Lebanon	Tunis, Tunisia
--:--

9 June 1963 Friendly	Tunisia	2–0	Lebanon	Tunis, Tunisia
--:--

26 September 1963 1963 Mediterranean Games GS	United Arab Republic	2–0; Awarded	Lebanon	Salerno, Italy
--:--				Stadium: Donato Vestuti Stadium
Note: The match, played on 25 September, was abandoned in the 27th minute due to a waterlogged pitch, with the two teams tied 0–0 at the time. It was scheduled to be replayed the following day, but Lebanon did not show up. As a result, the United Arab Republic was awarded a default 2–0 win.

8 March 1964 1964 Tripoli Fair Tournament GS	Lebanon	1–0	Libya	Tripoli, Libya
--:--	Itani 90' (pen.)

13 November 1964 1964 Arab Cup GS	Jordan	0–0	Lebanon	Shuwaikh, Kuwait
--:--				Stadium: Shuwaikh High School Stadium; Referee: Fehmi El Kimkaji (Iraq)

15 November 1964 1964 Arab Cup GS	Iraq	1–0	Lebanon	Shuwaikh, Kuwait
--:--				Stadium: Shuwaikh High School Stadium; Referee: Hedi Saoudi (Tunisia)

18 November 1964 1964 Arab Cup GS	Libya	2–1	Lebanon	Shuwaikh, Kuwait
--:--			Shaker	Stadium: Shuwaikh High School Stadium; Referee: Youssef Mohammad (Sudan)

20 November 1964 1964 Arab Cup GS	Kuwait	2–3	Lebanon	Shuwaikh, Kuwait
--:--			Chatila; Nassar	Stadium: Shuwaikh High School Stadium; Referee: Fehmi El Kimkaji (Iraq)

20 March 1965 Friendly	Cyprus	2–0	Lebanon	Nicosia, Cyprus
15:45 UTC+2	Panikos Krystallis 20', 44'	Report		Stadium: GSP Stadium; Referee: Mihalis Kiriakidis (Cyprus)

3 September 1965 1965 Arab Games GS	Palestine	1–0	Lebanon	Cairo, Egypt
--:--	Mughrabi 22'

4 September 1965 1965 Arab Games GS	United Arab Republic	3–0	Lebanon	Cairo, Egypt
--:--

6 September 1965 1965 Arab Games GS	Iraq	0–0	Lebanon	Cairo, Egypt
--:--				Stadium: Cairo International Stadium; Referee: Abideen Abdulrahman (Sudan)

2 April 1966 1966 Arab Cup GS	Lebanon	6–1	Bahrain	Baghdad, Iraq
--:--				Stadium: Al-Kashafa Stadium; Referee: Mamdouh Kharma (Jordan)

3 April 1966 1966 Arab Cup GS	Lebanon	2–1	Kuwait	Baghdad, Iraq
--:--	Al Sharqi			Stadium: Al-Kashafa Stadium; Referee: Salih Faraj (Iraq)

5 April 1966 1966 Arab Cup GS	Lebanon	2–1	Jordan	Baghdad, Iraq
--:--	Al Sharqi 56'; Abou Mrad 60'			Stadium: Al-Kashafa Stadium; Attendance: 18,000; Referee: Salih Faraj (Iraq)

7 April 1966 1966 Arab Cup GS	Iraq	0–0	Lebanon	Baghdad, Iraq
--:--				Stadium: Al-Kashafa Stadium; Attendance: 35,000; Referee: Mamdouh Kharma (Jordan)

9 April 1966 1966 Arab Cup SF	Syria	1–0	Lebanon	Baghdad, Iraq
--:--	Avédis			Stadium: Al-Kashafa Stadium; Referee: Salih Faraj (Iraq)

9 April 1966 1966 Arab Cup SF	Libya	6–1	Lebanon	Baghdad, Iraq
--:--				Stadium: Al-Kashafa Stadium; Referee: Rached Hawassli (Syria)

5 June 1966 Friendly	Senegal	2–3	Lebanon	Dakar, Senegal
--:--	Niang 47'; Diouck 82'		Al Sharqi 7', 67'; Altounian 50'	Stadium: Stade de l'Amitie; Attendance: 10,000

28 September 1967 1968 Olympics qualification	Lebanon	1–1	South Vietnam	Tokyo, Japan
--:--	Abou Mrad 40'		Phạm Huỳnh Tam Lang 70'	Stadium: Tokyo National Stadium; Attendance: 3,000

1 October 1967 1968 Olympics qualification	South Korea	2–0	Lebanon	Tokyo, Japan
--:--	Jung 24', 58'			Stadium: Tokyo National Stadium; Attendance: 902; Referee: Kenichi Fukushima (Japan)

3 October 1967 1968 Olympics qualification	Japan	3–1	Lebanon	Tokyo, Japan
--:--	Ogi 23'; Kamamoto 49'; Mori 73'		Altounian 20'	Stadium: Tokyo National Stadium; Attendance: 2,693; Referee: Eriberto Cruz (Philippines)

6 October 1967 1968 Olympics qualification	Lebanon	11–1	Philippines	Tokyo, Japan
--:--	Altounian 41', 59', 76', 79'; Nassar 44', 77', 78'; Abou Mrad 50'; Al Sharqi 51'		Pacheco 17'	Stadium: Tokyo National Stadium; Attendance: 500

9 October 1967 1968 Olympics qualification	Lebanon	5–2	Taiwan	Tokyo, Japan
--:--	Nassar 26', 88'; Altounian 37'; Abou Mrad 50'; Al Sharqi 84'		Law 1'; Tsang 74' (pen.)	Stadium: Tokyo National Stadium

=== 1970s ===
8 July 1970 1970 Al-Jalaa Tournament GS	Sudan	2–0	Lebanon	Tripoli, Libya
--:--

20 June 1971 1972 Olympics qualification	Lebanon	1–0	Iraq	Beirut, Lebanon
--:--	Torikian 58'			Stadium: Bourj Hammoud Stadium; Referee: Nejat Şener (Turkey)

19 September 1971 1972 Olympics qualification	Iraq	1–0	Lebanon	Baghdad, Iraq
--:--	Jassam 55'			Stadium: Al-Shaab Stadium; Referee: Abdelaziz El-Sayed (Egypt)

20 June 1971 1972 Olympics qualification	Iraq	2–1	Lebanon	Istanbul, Turkey
--:--	D. Aziz 27' (pen.); T. Aziz 87'		Hamzé 89'	Stadium: Mithatpaşa Stadium; Referee: Ömer Karabağ (Turkey)

11 December 1971 1972 Asian Cup qualification R1	Bahrain	3–0	Lebanon	Shuwaikh, Kuwait
--:--				Stadium: Shuwaikh High School Stadium; Referee: Jassem Al-Mehri (Kuwait)

14 December 1971 1972 Asian Cup qualification R2	Kuwait	1–0	Lebanon	Shuwaikh, Kuwait
--:--	Khalaf			Stadium: Shuwaikh High School Stadium; Referee: Hamza Mirza (Bahrain)
Note: In the 83rd minute, Souhail Rahal of Lebanon received a red card but refused to leave the pitch. Following this, the entire Lebanese team decided to abandon the game and left the field in protest.

19 December 1971 1972 Asian Cup qualification R2	Lebanon	3–2	Syria	Shuwaikh, Kuwait
--:--	Mantoufi 23'; Al Ghoul 35', 55'		Said 3'; Nano 25'	Stadium: Shuwaikh High School Stadium; Referee: Fernando (Sri Lanka)

22 December 1971 1972 Asian Cup qualification SF	Iraq	4–1	Lebanon	Shuwaikh, Kuwait
--:--	Kadhim 40', 53'; Aziz 65'; Ahmed 83'		Mantoufi 86'	Stadium: Shuwaikh High School Stadium; Referee: Khalid Al-Salaj (Jordan)

24 December 1971 1972 Asian Cup qualification 3rd	Lebanon	2–0	Jordan	Shuwaikh, Kuwait
--:--	Al Ghoul; Mantoufi	Report		Stadium: Shuwaikh High School Stadium; Referee: Abdul-Wahab Al-Bannai (Kuwait)

29 September 1974 1974 Kuneitra Cup GS	Lebanon	2–1	Tunisia	Damascus, Syria
--:--	Dougan 68' (pen.); El Sahili 85'		Al Khuwaini 13'	Stadium: Abbasiyyin Stadium; Attendance: 36,000; Referee: Karim Rouweyha (Syria)

1 October 1974 1974 Kuneitra Cup GS	Jordan	0–0	Lebanon	Damascus, Syria
--:--				Stadium: Abbasiyyin Stadium; Attendance: 8,000; Referee: Adnan Bouzo (Syria)

3 October 1974 1974 Kuneitra Cup GS	Morocco	3–0	Lebanon	Damascus, Syria
--:--	Al-Safawi; Ahmed; Ihardane			Stadium: Abbasiyyin Stadium; Referee: Karim Rouweyha (Syria)

5 October 1974 1974 Kuneitra Cup GS	Egypt	2–0	Lebanon	Damascus, Syria
--:--	Khalil; Hassan			Stadium: Abbasiyyin Stadium; Referee: M. Benjelloun (Morocco)

16 May 1975 1975 President's Cup GS	South Korea	1–0	Lebanon	Seoul, South Korea
19:40 UTC+9	Park 36'	Report		Stadium: Dongdaemun Stadium

25 May 1975 Friendly	Taiwan	0–2	Lebanon	Taiwan
--:--			Al Ghoul 22'; Rahal 74'

27 May 1975 Friendly	Thailand	1–2	Lebanon	Bangkok, Thailand
--:--			Al Ghoul 23'; Al Asta 43'	Stadium: National Stadium

16 November 1979 1980 Asian Cup qualification	United Arab Emirates	0–0	Lebanon	Abu Dhabi, United Arab Emirates
--:--				Stadium: Mohammed bin Zayed Stadium; Referee: Muhib Al Jaid (Saudi Arabia)

20 November 1979 1980 Asian Cup qualification	Lebanon	Cancelled	Bahrain	Abu Dhabi, United Arab Emirates
--:--				Stadium: Mohammed bin Zayed Stadium
Note: Bahrain withdrew from the 1980 Asian Cup qualification tournament after their game against Syria.

22 November 1979 1980 Asian Cup qualification	Syria	1–0	Lebanon	Abu Dhabi, United Arab Emirates
--:--	Qaddour 21'			Stadium: Mohammed bin Zayed Stadium; Referee: Abdulwahab Binai (Kuwait)

=== 1980s ===
15 March 1985 1986 FIFA World Cup qualification R1	Iraq	6–0	Lebanon	Kuwait City, Kuwait
--:--	Radhi; Saeed; Allawi; Hashim			Stadium: Mohammed Al-Hamad Stadium; Referee: Fallaj Al-Shanar (Saudi Arabia)
Note: Lebanon played four matches before withdrawing from the 1986 FIFA World Cup qualification. Their results were annulled.

18 March 1985 1986 FIFA World Cup qualification R1	Lebanon	0–6	Iraq	Kuwait City, Kuwait
--:--			Radhi; Saeed; Allawi	Stadium: Sabah Al Salem Stadium; Referee: Fahd Al-Dahmash (Saudi Arabia)
Note: Lebanon played four matches before withdrawing from the 1986 FIFA World Cup qualification. Their results were annulled.

22 March 1985 1986 FIFA World Cup qualification R1	Qatar	7–0	Lebanon	Al Rayyan, Qatar
--:--	Muftah; Khamis; Khalfan; Dahman			Stadium: Khalifa International Stadium; Referee: Hamed Assaid (Oman)
Note: Lebanon played four matches before withdrawing from the 1986 FIFA World Cup qualification. Their results were annulled.

25 March 1985 Friendly	Bahrain	6–0	Lebanon	Manama, Bahrain
--:--				Stadium: Manama International Stadium; Referee: Ahmad Jassem (Bahrain)

27 March 1985 1986 FIFA World Cup qualification R1	Lebanon	0–8	Qatar	Doha, Qatar
--:--			Muftah; Al-Zeid; Aheed	Stadium: Grand Hamad Stadium; Referee: Jassim Mandi (Bahrain)
Note: Lebanon played four matches before withdrawing from the 1986 FIFA World Cup qualification. Their results were annulled.

16 September 1987 1987 Mediterranean Games GS	San Marino	0–0	Lebanon	Aleppo, Syria
--:--		Report		Stadium: Al-Hamadaniah Stadium; Referee: Christos Kolokythas (Greece)

20 September 1987 1987 Mediterranean Games GS	Syria	6–1	Lebanon	Aleppo, Syria
--:--	Ahmad; Al-Sel; Deeb 65', 70'; Saad 80'; Al Shaar 87'		Abboud 55' (pen.)	Stadium: Al-Hamadaniah Stadium

11 April 1988 1988 Arab Cup qualification	Syria	2–1	Lebanon	Aleppo, Syria
--:--			Hammoud 18'	Stadium: Al-Hamadaniah Stadium; Referee: Mohammad Hansal (Algeria)

13 April 1988 1988 Arab Cup qualification	Lebanon	0–0	Palestine	Aleppo, Syria
--:--				Stadium: Al-Hamadaniah Stadium; Referee: Ahmad Al Bash (Jordan)

3 July 1988 Friendly	Jordan	1–0	Lebanon	Amman, Jordan
--:--				Stadium: Amman International Stadium

6 July 1988 Friendly	Kuwait	1–0	Lebanon	Amman, Jordan
--:--				Stadium: Amman International Stadium

11 July 1988 1988 Arab Cup GS	Iraq	0–0	Lebanon	Amman, Jordan
--:--				Stadium: Amman International Stadium; Attendance: 8,000

13 July 1988 1988 Arab Cup GS	Lebanon	1–0	Saudi Arabia	Amman, Jordan
--:--	Hammoud 81'			Stadium: Amman International Stadium; Attendance: 18,000

15 July 1988 1988 Arab Cup GS	Egypt	3–0	Lebanon	Amman, Jordan
--:--	Shawky 29'; Abouzaid 68'; H. Hassan 88'			Stadium: Amman International Stadium; Attendance: 22,000

17 July 1988 1988 Arab Cup GS	Lebanon	1–1	Tunisia	Amman, Jordan
--:--	Hammoud 65'		Mehedhebi 46'	Stadium: Amman International Stadium; Attendance: 25,000

30 October 1989 1989 Peace and Friendship Cup GS	Kuwait	5–0	Lebanon	Kuwait City, Kuwait
15:30 UTC+3	Al-Anbari 14'; Abdul Nabi 39'; Suleyman 40'; Al-Hassawi 57', 78'	Report		Stadium: Al-Sadaqua Walsalam Stadium; Attendance: 35,000; Referee: Kim Milton Nielsen (Denmark)

2 November 1989 1989 Peace and Friendship Cup GS	Uganda	2–0	Lebanon	Kuwait City, Kuwait
14:30 UTC+3	Senoga 29'; Musisi 38'			Stadium: Al-Sadaqua Walsalam Stadium; Attendance: 13,000; Referee: Mohamed Salah Karim
