= Joseph Abou Mrad =

Lebanese football player and manager

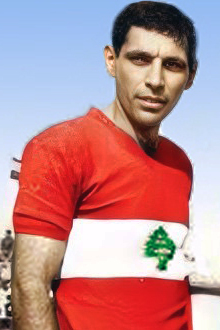
- Abou Mrad with Lebanon in 1966

Personal information
- Date of birth: 18 April 1933
- Place of birth: Lebanese Republic
- Date of death: 28 October 2003 (aged 70)
- Place of death: Lebanon
- Position: Striker

Senior career*
Years	Team	Apps	(Gls)
1952–1953	Intisar Chiyah		
1953–1966	Racing Beirut		

International career
1953–1967	Lebanon	24+	(11+)

Managerial career
- 1971–1973: Lebanon
- 1976–1979: Lebanon
- * Club domestic league appearances and goals

Joseph Abou Mrad (Arabic: جوزيف أبو مراد; 18 April 1933 – 28 October 2003) was a Lebanese footballer and manager. He played as a striker for Racing Beirut and the Lebanon national team.

Abou Mrad was awarded Lebanese Premier League top-scorer with 18 goals during the 1964–65 season. Abou Mrad played for the Lebanon national team, and scored the opening goal at the Camille Chamoun Sports City Stadium in 1957 against Romanian club Energia Ploiești. He was also the captain of the national team in 1966.

Abou Mrad was Racing Beirut's sporting director in 1971. He coached Lebanon during the 1970s, failing to qualify Lebanon to the Asian Cup during their first qualifications in 1972.

== Club career ==
Abou Mrad started his senior career at Intisar Chiyah, before moving to Lebanese Premier League club Racing Beirut in 1953, with whom he stayed until his retirement in 1966. Abou Mrad helped his side win two league titles, in 1955–56 and 1964–65. In the latter season, Abou Mrad was the season's top-goalscorer, with 18 goals. This award was both preceded and succeeded by fellow national Levon Altonian. Abou Mrad retired from football in 1966.

== International career ==
Abou Mrad represented Lebanon internationally between 1953 and 1966. He played in a friendly against Hungary, on 23 January 1955, scoring one goal in a 2–3 defeat. Abou Mrad also played in another friendly against Hungary, on 29 February 1966, which ended in a 1–4 defeat. In 1957 Abou Mrad scored in the Camille Chamoun Sports City Stadium's opening game against Romanian club Energia Ploiești. Abou Mrad captained Lebanon at the 1966 Arab Cup, where Lebanon came fourth.

== Managerial career ==
On 18 January 1971, Abou Mrad was nominated sporting director of Racing Beirut by the club's General Assembly. He coached Lebanon from 1971 to 1973 and from 1976 to 1979, failing to qualify Lebanon to the Asian Cup during their first qualifications in 1972 and 1980.

== Career statistics ==
=== International ===
Scores and results list Lebanon's goal tally first, score column indicates score after each Abou Mrad goal.

List of international goals scored by Joseph Abou Mrad
No.	Date	Venue	Opponent	Score	Result	Competition
1	3 August 1953	Alexandria, Egypt	Jordan	–	1–4	1953 Arab Games
2	18 October 1957	Camille Chamoun Sports City Stadium, Beirut, Lebanon	Saudi Arabia	1–0	1–1	1957 Arab Games
3	22 October 1957	Camille Chamoun Sports City Stadium, Beirut, Lebanon	Jordan	–	6–0	1957 Arab Games
4	26 January 1962	Kuwait University Stadium, Kuwait City, Kuwait	Kuwait	1–0	5–0	Friendly
5	4 April 1963	Camille Chamoun Sports City Stadium, Beirut, Lebanon	Syria	1–0	2–3	1963 Arab Cup
6	6 April 1963	Camille Chamoun Sports City Stadium, Beirut, Lebanon	Jordan	1–0	5–0	1963 Arab Cup
7	3 April 1966	Al-Kashafa Stadium, Baghdad, Iraq	Bahrain	–	6–1	1966 Arab Cup
8	5 April 1966	Al-Kashafa Stadium, Baghdad, Iraq	Jordan	–	2–1	1966 Arab Cup
9	28 September 1967	Tokyo National Stadium, Tokyo, Japan	South Vietnam	–	1–1	1968 Summer Olympics qualification
10	6 October 1967	Tokyo National Stadium, Tokyo, Japan	Philippines	–	11–1	1968 Summer Olympics qualification
11	9 October 1967	Tokyo National Stadium, Tokyo, Japan	Taiwan	–	5–2	1968 Summer Olympics qualification

== Honours ==
=== Player ===
Racing Beirut

- Lebanese Premier League: 1955–56, 1964–65

Lebanon

- Pan Arab Games third place: 1957
- Arab Cup third place: 1963

Individual

- Lebanese Premier League top goalscorer: 1964–65
