= Football at the 1957 Arab Games =

1957 Arab Games football tournament
Tournament details
- Host country: Lebanon
- City: Beirut
- Dates: 19–27 October 1957
- Teams: 8 (from 2 confederations)
- Venue: 2 (in 1 host city)

Final positions
- Champions: Syria (1st title)
- Runners-up: Tunisia
- Third place: Lebanon
- Fourth place: Morocco

Tournament statistics
- Matches played: 15
- Goals scored: 64 (4.27 per match)

The 1957 Arab Games football tournament was the 2nd edition of the Arab Games men's football tournament. The football tournament was held in Beirut, Lebanon between 19–27 October 1957 as part of the 1957 Arab Games.

== Participating teams ==
The following countries have participated for the final tournament:

- Iraq
- Jordan
- Lebanon (hosts)
- Libya
- Morocco
- Saudi Arabia
- Syria
- Tunisia

== Group stage ==
=== Group A ===
Team	Pld	W	D	L	GF	GA	GD	Pts
Morocco	3	2	1	0	11	5	+6	5
Tunisia	3	2	0	1	9	8	+1	4
Iraq	3	1	1	1	8	8	0	3
Libya	3	0	0	3	5	12	–7	0

19 October 1957

Morocco	3–3	Iraq
El-Madani; Benchekroun (pen.)		Ammo Baba 48'; Eshaya 50'; Salman 63'

Beirut
19 October 1957

Tunisia	4–3	Libya
Touati; Hénia; Farzit		El-Shualia; El-Falah

Beirut

21 October 1957

Morocco	5–1	Libya
Benchekroun; Khalifi; Rhiad		Al-Safr

Beirut
21 October 1957

Tunisia	4–2	Iraq
Diwa; Farzit; Hénia		Abbas (pen.); David

Beirut

23 October 1957

Tunisia	1–3	Morocco
Touati		Rhiad

Beirut
23 October 1957

Iraq	3–1	Libya
Ammo Baba; Eshaya; Abdul-Majid		El-Shualia

Beirut

=== Group B ===
Team	Pld	W	D	L	GF	GA	GD	Pts
Lebanon	3	1	2	0	8	5	+3	4
Syria	3	1	1	1	8	5	+3	3
Saudi Arabia	3	1	1	1	4	3	+1	3
Jordan	3	1	0	2	5	12	–7	2

18 October 1957

Saudi Arabia	1–1	Lebanon
Kayyal 30'		Abou Mrad 22'

Camille Chamoun Stadium, Beirut
18 October 1957

Syria	6–1	Jordan
Kaoulakian; Mahmoud; Hajjar		Musa

Camille Chamoun Stadium, Beirut

20 October 1957

Jordan	1–0	Saudi Arabia
Shafiq Adass 65'

Camille Chamoun Stadium, Beirut
20 October 1957

Syria	1–1	Lebanon
Mahmoud		Halabi

Camille Chamoun Stadium, Beirut

22 October 1957

Saudi Arabia	3–1	Syria
Al-Yafei 14', 55'; Janja 75'		Mahmoud 34'

Camille Chamoun Stadium, Beirut
22 October 1957

Lebanon	6–3	Jordan
Abou Murad; Chabarian; Altonian; Chehade		Shafiq Adass; Shehada Musa

Camille Chamoun Stadium, Beirut

== Knockout stage ==
Semifinals
26 October – Beirut
Tunisia	4
Lebanon	2
26 October – Beirut
Syria (o.l)	1
Morocco	1

Final
27 October – Beirut
Tunisia	1
Syria	3
Third place
27 October – Beirut
Lebanon	–
Morocco (w/o)	–

=== Semifinals ===
26 October 1957

Tunisia	4–2	Lebanon
Touati; Hénia		Chehade

Beirut

26 October 1957

Syria	1–1 (Syria on lots)	Morocco
Kaoulakian		Rhiad

Beirut

=== Third place match ===
27 October 1957

Lebanon	Cancelled (Morocco withdrew)	Morocco

Beirut

=== Final ===
27 October 1957

Tunisia	1–3	Syria
Fedou		Shamas; Kaoulakian

Beirut

== Final ranking ==
Rank	Team	Pld	W	D	L	GF	GA	GD	Pts
1	Syria	5	2	2	1	10	6	+3	6
2	Tunisia	5	2	2	1	12	6	+6	6
3	Lebanon	5	2	2	1	10	9	+1	6
4	Morocco	5	3	0	2	14	13	+1	6
Eliminated in the group stage
5	Saudi Arabia	3	1	1	1	4	3	+1	3
6	Iraq	3	1	1	1	8	8	0	3
7	Jordan	3	1	0	2	4	10	−6	2
8	Libya	3	0	0	3	5	12	−7	0
Total		32	12	8	12	67	67	0	32
