= Saudi Arabia national football team =

Men's national association football team representing Saudi Arabia

Saudi Arabia
- Nickname(s): الصقور الخضر, al-Ṣuqūr al-Khuḍr (The Green Falcons) الصقور العربية, al-Ṣuqūr al-ʿArabiyya (The Arabian Falcons)
- Association: Saudi Arabian Football Federation (SAFF)
- Confederation: AFC (Asia)
- Sub-confederation: WAFF (West Asia)
- Head coach: Georgios Donis
- Captain: Salem Al-Dawsari
- Most caps: Mohamed Al-Deayea (173)
- Top scorer: Majed Abdullah (72)
- Home stadium: Various
- FIFA code: KSA
First colours	Second colours

FIFA ranking
- Current: 54 ▲1 (18 November 2026)
- Highest: 21 (July 2004)
- Lowest: 126 (December 2012)

First international
- Lebanon 1–1 Saudi Arabia (Beirut, Lebanon; 18 January 1957)

Biggest win
- Timor-Leste 0–10 Saudi Arabia (Dili, Timor-Leste; 17 November 2015)

Biggest defeat
- United Arab Republic 13–0 Saudi Arabia (Casablanca, Morocco; 3 September 1961)

World Cup
- Appearances: 7 (first in 1994)
- Best result: Round of 16 (1994)

AFC Asian Cup
- Appearances: 12 (first in 1984)
- Best result: Champions (1984, 1988, 1996)

Arab Cup
- Appearances: 8 (first in 1985)
- Best result: Champions (1998, 2002)

Arabian Gulf Cup
- Appearances: 26 (first in 1970)
- Best result: Champions (1994, 2002, 2003–04, 2026)

CONCACAF Gold Cup
- Appearances: 1 (first in 2025)
- Best result: Quarter-finals (2025)

Confederations Cup
- Appearances: 4 (first in 1992)
- Best result: Runners-up (1992)
Medal record
Men's football
FIFA Confederations Cup
Silver medal – second place	Saudi Arabia 1992	Squad
Afro-Asian Cup of Nations
Silver medal – second place	Cameroon and Saudi Arabia 1985	Squad
Silver medal – second place	South Africa and Saudi Arabia 1997	Squad
Arab Cup
Gold medal – first place	Qatar 1998	Squad
Gold medal – first place	Kuwait 2002	Squad
Silver medal – second place	Syria 1992	Squad
Bronze medal – third place	Saudi Arabia 1985	Squad
AFC Asian Cup
Gold medal – first place	Singapore 1984	Squad
Gold medal – first place	Qatar 1988	Squad
Gold medal – first place	UAE 1996	Squad
Silver medal – second place	Japan 1992	Squad
Silver medal – second place	Lebanon 2000	Squad
Silver medal – second place	Indonesia, Malaysia, Thailand and Vietnam 2007	Squad
Asian Games
Silver medal – second place	Seoul 1986	Squad
Bronze medal – third place	New Delhi 1982	Squad
Arab Games
Silver medal – second place	Damascus 1976	Squad
Bronze medal – third place	Cairo 2007	Squad
- Website: saff.sa

The Saudi Arabia national football team (Arabic: مُنْتَخَب السُّعُودِيَّة لِكُرَّةِ الْقَدَم) represents the country in senior men's international association football. The team is governed by the Saudi Arabian Football Federation (SAFF), the governing body for football in Saudi Arabia.

Considered one of Asia's most successful national teams, Saudi Arabia has won the AFC Asian Cup three times (1984, 1988, and 1996), reached a joint record six Asian Cup finals and have qualified for the FIFA World Cup on seven occasions since debuting at the 1994 tournament. Saudi Arabia is the first Asian team to reach the final of a senior FIFA competition at the 1992 King Fahd Cup, which would eventually become the FIFA Confederations Cup. Only Australia and Japan managed to repeat this feat in 1997 and 2001, respectively, though Australia achieved it when they were a member of the OFC.

At the 1994 FIFA World Cup, under the leadership of Jorge Solari, Saudi Arabia beat both Belgium and Morocco in the group stage before falling to Sweden in the round of 16. Thus, they became the second Arab team in history to reach the knockout stage of a FIFA World Cup after Morocco in 1986 and 2022, and one of the few Asian national football teams (the others being Australia, Japan, South Korea, and North Korea) to accomplish such a feat to date. During the 2022 FIFA World Cup, Saudi Arabia caused a significant upset when they beat eventual champions Argentina 2–1, the first time Argentina lost to an Asian representative at the World Cup. However, Saudi Arabia then lost the following matches against Poland and Mexico to finish last.

In 2027, Saudi Arabia will host the AFC Asian Cup, the first time that the nation has ever hosted a major international tournament. They will also host the 2034 FIFA World Cup.

== History ==
=== Early history (1951–1955) ===
The idea of a Saudi national team first emerged in 1951, when a Saudi XI team, consisting of players from Al-Wehda and Al-Ahli took part in a friendly game against the Egyptian Ministry of Health on 27 June at the Al-Saban Stadium in Jeddah. The following day, the Egyptians faced a Saudi team made up of players from Al-Ittihad and Al-Hilal in Al-Bahri, in the same city. On 2 August, His Royal Highness Prince Abdullah Al-Faisal organized a third friendly with the Egyptian team against Saudi Arabia featuring players from Al-Wehda, and Al-Ahli. By then, the idea of a national select team to represent the Kingdom of Saudi Arabia was already in full swing, and in 1953, the first-ever Saudi team traveled to play friendly matches abroad. The same year, a Saudi team traveled to Damascus to play friendly matches as part of then-Crown Prince Saud bin Abdulaziz's visit to the country in April.

In 1957, the Saudi national team took part in its first international tournament at the 2nd Pan-Arab Games in Beirut, where King Saud was invited to attend the opening ceremony and the inauguration of the Camille Chamoun Sports City Stadium with Lebanese President Camille Chamoun on 18 October. Abdulmajeed Kayal scored for the Saudis, while Levon Altonian netted for the home side.

=== Debuting successes and subsequent declines (1956–2016) ===
Though their football federation was established in 1956, the Saudi Arabia national team did not participate in a tournament until they qualified for the AFC Asian Cup in 1984, becoming Asian champions for the first time. Since then, it reached the next four consecutive Asian Cup finals, winning two of them (1988 and 1996). The team has qualified for every AFC Asian Cup since, reaching the final in the 2007 edition.

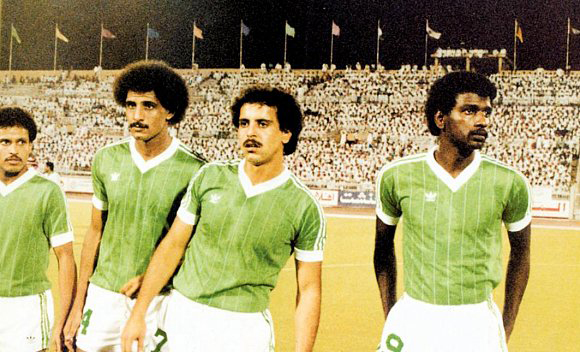
Saudi national team in 1984.

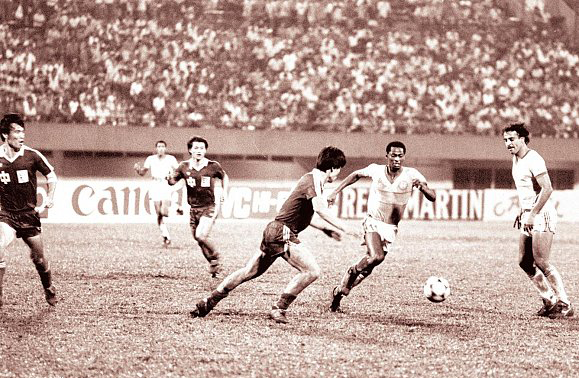
Saudi Arabia facing China in the 1984 AFC Asian Cup.

Saudi Arabia qualified for their first FIFA World Cup in 1994 under the leadership of Argentine manager Jorge Solari and talents like Saeed Al-Owairan and Sami Al-Jaber, reinforced by national veteran Majed Abdullah as team captain. Wins against Belgium and Morocco in the group stage led to a match-up against Sweden in the round of 16, resulting in a 3–1 loss. Saudi Arabia qualified for the next three FIFA World Cups, but failed to win a match in any of them. In the 1998 FIFA World Cup, the team suffered an agonizing group stage elimination for the first time after achieving only a draw, which occurred against South Africa. The team placed last in the 2002 FIFA World Cup without scoring a goal, while conceding 12, including eight against Germany, marking the most humiliating FIFA World Cup performance ever by an Asian team since 1954, and the team saw no improvement in the 2006 FIFA World Cup after winning only a single point against Arab rival Tunisia.

After the 2007 AFC Asian Cup, Saudi Arabia suffered even further setbacks. The Saudis failed to qualify for the 2010 FIFA World Cup in agonizing playoffs that saw them again give up their 2–1 lead to a 2–2 draw against neighbor Bahrain. In the 2011 AFC Asian Cup, the Saudis went on to have their worst-ever Asian Cup performance in history, losing all three games in shocking fashion to Syria, Jordan and Japan. Later on, Saudi Arabia failed to qualify for the 2014 FIFA World Cup, finishing behind Australia and Oman in the third round. This embarrassing record kept following the Saudis into the 2015 AFC Asian Cup, as the Saudis suffered another group stage exit, this time losing to China and Uzbekistan. They only won against North Korea.

=== Revival (2017–present) ===
Saudi Arabia secured qualification for the 2018 FIFA World Cup, their first in 12 years, ahead of Australia. In the first match of Group A and the tournament, Saudi Arabia was crushed by hosts Russia 5–0, making this the second largest victory of any host. Saudi Arabia then lost 1–0 to a Luis Suárez goal that put Uruguay as the eventual group winners. Although they were already eliminated, Saudi Arabia managed to win their final group stage match against Red Sea neighbours Egypt 2–1, coming back from behind after a Mohamed Salah goal.

After the 2018 World Cup, Saudi Arabia participated in the 2019 AFC Asian Cup, held in the United Arab Emirates; the team finished second in the group stage, after falling to Qatar in the final game, leading to a showdown against Japan in the round of 16. The Saudis dominated the whole game, but ultimately lost 1–0 due to poor finishing.

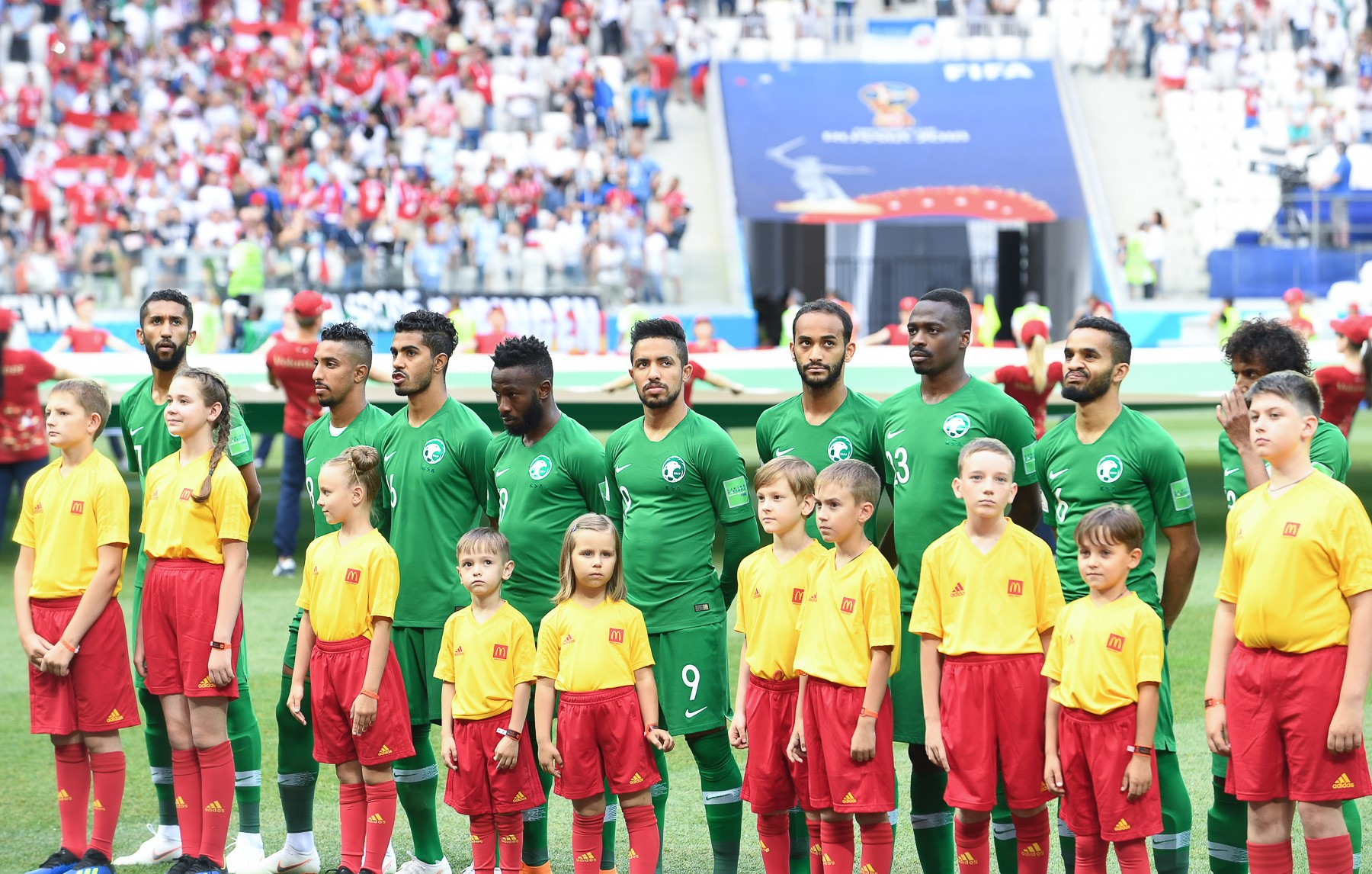
Saudi Arabia against Egypt in the 2018 World Cup.

On 15 October 2019, Saudi Arabia played its first-ever game with Palestine in the West Bank; the game marked a change in policy for Saudi Arabia, which has previously played matches against the Palestinian team in third-party countries. The visit was condemned by some Palestinian activists, who considered the game as a start of normalizing the relations between Saudi Arabia and Israel, but it was viewed by the Palestinian National Authority as a support for their sovereignty over the West Bank. The game ended in a scoreless draw.

Saudi Arabia qualified for the 2022 FIFA World Cup in Qatar, the first to be held in the Middle East, by topping their qualifying group and were drawn against Argentina, Poland and Mexico. In their opening game, they upset Argentina 2–1 within the first five minutes of the second half with goals from Saleh Al-Shehri and Salem Al-Dawsari, ending an Argentine unbeaten streak of 36 games dating back to 2019. The Saudi King declared a holiday after the win and Saudi fans celebrated with mocking words against Lionel Messi and the Argentine team. In the next match against Poland, Piotr Zieliński opened proceedings with a goal in the 39th minute and Robert Lewandowski scored the second goal, while Salem Al-Dawsari's penalty kick was saved by Polish goalkeeper Wojciech Szczęsny as Saudi Arabia lost 2–0. This required a win against Mexico to advance to the round of 16 regardless of the Argentina–Poland result. Fielding three strikers in front, Saudi Arabia however were unable to exert any domination over the Mexican side, conceding two early second half goals by Henry Martín and Luis Chávez, the second being a thunderous midfield free kick; a late consolation goal by Salem Al-Dawsari was not enough as Saudi Arabia fell 2–1 and were eliminated after finishing last in Group C.

Saudi Arabia starting line-up against eventual 2022 FIFA World Cup champions, where Saudi Arabia went on to beat Argentina 2–1.

Saudi Arabia, under new manager Roberto Mancini, entered the 2023 AFC Asian Cup in Group F with Oman, Kyrgyzstan and Thailand. The Saudis started their campaign with a 2–1 comeback win over neighbour Oman, where Abdulrahman Ghareeb scored from a solo before a late Ali Al-Bulaihi's header sealed the dramatic win. They then achieved a 2–0 win over Kyrgyzstan, where the Saudis were dominant from beginning to end against a nine-man squad. The Saudis rested most of their key players as they held Thailand in a goalless draw to advance and top the group, putting the Saudis against South Korea in the last sixteen. Against South Korea, Abdullah Radif opened the scoring in the first minute of the second half, but after conceding a Cho Gue-sung header in the ninth minute of second-half stoppage time, the game was determined by a penalty shootout after 30 minutes of extra time, where the Saudis lost 4–2 on penalties and were eliminated.

Saudi Arabia struggled in their 2026 FIFA World Cup qualification campaign. After the second round, Saudi Arabia's third round proved troublesome; excluding China as the only team Saudi Arabia grabbed full six points, they obtained only one point against Indonesia along with a 2–0 home loss to Japan, the first time ever Saudi Arabia lost to the Japanese at home. Roberto Mancini was then sacked and Hervé Renard was recalled to salvage Saudi Arabia's campaign, but Saudi Arabia still failed to finish second place behind Australia in the end, resulting in their appearance in the fourth round.

Saudi Arabia participated in their first CONCACAF Gold Cup tournament in 2025, reaching the quarter-finals where they lost 2–0 to Mexico. They then qualified for the 2026 FIFA World Cup in October 2025, following their 3–2 fourth-round win over Indonesia and a goalless draw to Iraq that allowed Saudi Arabia to stay on top by superior goals scored; this is their third consecutive World Cup appearance and seventh overall.

== Kits and crests ==
Traditionally, Saudi Arabia's home kit is white with a green trim, and the away kit is green with a white trim (the Saudi flag colors). The team switched their colors to green as the home and white as the away in 2023.

=== Kit suppliers ===
Kit supplier	Period
(United Kingdom) Admiral	1976–1979
(Germany) Puma	1980–1984
(Argentina) Topper	1984–1986
(Saudi Arabia) Faisok	1987–1989
(Germany) Adidas	1990–1993
(Saudi Arabia) Shammel	1994–2000
(Germany) Adidas	2001–2003
(France) Le Coq Sportif	2004–2005
(Germany) Puma	2006–2010
(United States) Nike	2011–2023
(Germany) Adidas	2023–present

== Rivalries ==
Saudi Arabia's main rivals are mostly from the Gulf, notably Iran, Iraq, Qatar, Kuwait, and the United Arab Emirates.

Due to historical reasons, matches against Iran have been frequently followed and seen by Saudis as the most important rival. This stems from the strong hatred between Saudi Arabia and Iran, in particular in recent years due to historical enmities. Saudi Arabia has won 6 matches, drew 6 times, and lost 5 against Iran. In 2014, Bleacher Report called it one of the ten most heated rivalries with political influence.

Saudi Arabia's rivalry against Iraq began in the 1970s. Due to the Gulf War, in which Iraq invaded Saudi Arabia's ally Kuwait, Saudi Arabia and Iraq eventually became bitter rivals fighting to salvage Arab pride. The two countries since then have been up-and-down in relations, often ranging from lack of cooperation to political confrontation. Iraq almost pulled out of the 21st Arabian Gulf Cup after the country was disallowed to host the competition in a move believed to be motivated by Saudi Arabia.

Outside the Middle East, the Saudis also have established rivalries with South Korea, Japan (including two Asian Cup finals) and most recently Australia.

== Venues ==
Historically, Saudi Arabia played most of their home matches in King Fahd Sports City, located in the capital Riyadh. The stadium was also where some of Saudi Arabia's most important fixtures were played when the country hosted the first three King Fahd Cups (the predecessor of the FIFA Confederations Cup). The stadium was also home to some of Saudi Arabia's matches in the FIFA World Cup qualifiers.

Saudi Arabia started to diversify the use of venues from outside Riyadh in the 2000s, with the 2002 FIFA World Cup qualifying first round being played in Prince Mohamed bin Fahd Stadium in Dammam and the second round being played entirely in Prince Faisal bin Fahd Stadium. In the 2006 FIFA World Cup qualifying second round against Sri Lanka and the first fixture against Uzbekistan in the third round, Saudi Arabia also played in Prince Mohamed bin Fahd Stadium.

== Results and fixtures ==
The following is a list of match results in the last 12 months, as well as any future matches that have been scheduled.

Win Draw Loss Fixture

=== 2025 ===
2 December 2025 FIFA Arab Cup GS	Saudi Arabia	2–1	Oman	Al Rayyan, Qatar
20:00 UTC+3	Al-Buraikan 55'; Al-Shehri 77'	Report	Al-Habashi 70'	Stadium: Education City Stadium; Attendance: 21,628; Referee: Adham Makhadmeh (Jordan)

5 December 2025 FIFA Arab Cup GS	Comoros	1–3	Saudi Arabia	Al Khor, Qatar
21:30 UTC+3	Djoudja 63'	Report	Kanno 45+4', 51'; Al-Dawsari 76'	Stadium: Al Bayt Stadium; Attendance: 32,219; Referee: Juan Calderón (Costa Rica)

8 December 2025 FIFA Arab Cup GS	Morocco	1–0	Saudi Arabia	Lusail, Qatar
20:00 UTC+3	El Berkaoui 11'	Report		Stadium: Lusail Stadium; Attendance: 78,131; Referee: Mario Escobar (Guatemala)

11 December 2025 FIFA Arab Cup QF	Palestine	1–2 (a.e.t.)	Saudi Arabia	Lusail, Qatar
20:30 UTC+3	Dabbagh 64'	Report	Al-Buraikan 58' (pen.); Kanno 115'	Stadium: Lusail Stadium; Attendance: 77,197; Referee: Amin Omar (Egypt)

15 December 2025 FIFA Arab Cup SF	Saudi Arabia	0–1	Jordan	Al Khor, Qatar
20:30 UTC+3	Al-Ahmed (red card) 90+6'	Report	Al-Rashdan 66'	Stadium: Al Bayt Stadium; Attendance: 62,825; Referee: Juan Gabriel Benítez (Paraguay)

18 December 2025 FIFA Arab Cup 3rd place	Saudi Arabia	0–0; Abandoned	United Arab Emirates	Al Rayyan, Qatar
14:00 UTC+3		Report		Stadium: Khalifa International Stadium; Referee: Cristián Garay (Chile)
Note: Match was abandoned at halftime (when the score was 0–0) due to heavy rainfall.

=== 2026 ===
27 March Friendly	Saudi Arabia	0–4	Egypt	Jeddah, Saudi Arabia (Note: The Saudi Arabia v Egypt match, originally scheduled to be played at the Ahmad bin Ali Stadium, Al Rayyan, was relocated to Saudi Arabia due to the 2026 Iran war.)
20:30 UTC+3		Report	Issa 4'; Trézéguet 16'; Zizo 44'; Marmoush 56'	Stadium: King Abdullah Sports City; Attendance: 25,000; Referee: Abdulla Ali Al Athba (Qatar)

31 March Friendly	Serbia	2–1	Saudi Arabia	Bačka Topola, Serbia (Note: The Serbia v Saudi Arabia match, originally scheduled to be played at the Jassim bin Hamad Stadium, Al Rayyan, was relocated to Serbia due to the 2026 Iran war.)
17:00 UTC+3	Pavlović 66'; Mitrović 70'	Report	Al-Hamdan 8'	Stadium: TSC Arena; Attendance: 4,101; Referee: Balázs Berke (Hungary)

30 May Friendly	Ecuador	2–1	Saudi Arabia	Harrison, New Jersey, United States
19:30 UTC−4	Porozo 35'; Valencia 51'	Report	Mandash 87'	Stadium: Sports Illustrated Stadium; Attendance: 20,000; Referee: Pierre-Luc Lauziere (Canada)

5 June Friendly	Puerto Rico	0–3	Saudi Arabia	Austin, Texas, United States
19:00 UTC−4		Report	Mandash 45+1'; Al-Hamdan 50'; S. Al-Dawsari 88'	Stadium: Q2 Stadium; Referee: Reon Radix (Grenada)

9 June Friendly	Saudi Arabia	0–0	Senegal	San Antonio, Texas, United States
16:00 UTC−5				Stadium: Toyota Field; Attendance: 3,500; Referee: Víctor Rivas (United States)

15 June 2026 World Cup GS	Saudi Arabia	1–1	Uruguay	Miami Gardens, Florida, United States
18:00 UTC−4	Al-Amri 41'	Report	Araújo 80'	Stadium: Hard Rock Stadium; Attendance: 62,764; Referee: Maurizio Mariani (Italy)

21 June 2026 World Cup GS	Spain	4–0	Saudi Arabia	Atlanta, Georgia, United States
12:00 UTC−4		Report		Stadium: Mercedes-Benz Stadium; Attendance: 68,239; Referee: Raphael Claus (Brazil)

26 June 2026 World Cup GS	Cape Verde	0–0	Saudi Arabia	Houston, Texas, United States
19:00 UTC−5		Report		Stadium: NRG Stadium; Attendance: 68,278; Referee: François Letexier (France)

23 September 2026 Gulf Cup GS	Saudi Arabia	1–0	Kuwait	Jeddah, Saudi Arabia
17:30 UTC+3	Al Haqan 73' (o.g.)			Stadium: King Abdullah Sports City Stadium

26 September 2026 Gulf Cup GS	Oman	0–3	Saudi Arabia	Jeddah, Saudi Arabia
21:00 UTC+3			Al-Buraikan 11', 34'; Kadesh 18'	Stadium: King Abdullah Sports City Stadium

29 September 2026 Gulf Cup GS	Saudi Arabia	2–0	Iraq	Jeddah, Saudi Arabia
20:30 UTC+3	Al-Salem 54'; Al-Hamdan 69'			Stadium: King Abdullah Sports City Stadium

3 October 2026 Gulf Cup SF	Saudi Arabia	0–0 (a.e.t.) (3–2 p)	Qatar	Jeddah, Saudi Arabia
18:55 UTC+3		Report		Stadium: King Abdullah Sports City Stadium; Attendance: 51,342; Referee: João Pinheiro (Portugal)
	Penalties
	Al-Hamdan (penalty scored); Kanno (penalty scored); Al-Tambakti (penalty missed); Al-Buraikan (penalty missed); Ali (penalty scored)		(penalty missed) A. Ali; (penalty scored) Edmilson; (penalty missed) Gaber; (penalty missed) Khoukhi; (penalty scored) Al-Ganehi

6 October 2026 Gulf Cup Final	Saudi Arabia	2–0	United Arab Emirates	Jeddah, Saudi Arabia
21:00 UTC+3				Stadium: King Abdullah Sports City Stadium

13 November Friendly	Saudi Arabia	3–2	South Korea	Al Rayyan, Qatar
17:30 UTC+3	Al-Sahafi 45+1'; Kanno 57'; Al-Amri 59'		Oh Hyeon-gyu 47'; Lee Jae-sung 69'	Stadium: Jassim Bin Hamad Stadium

17 November Friendly	Saudi Arabia	1–2	Uzbekistan	Doha, Qatar
18:30 UTC+3	Al-Buraikan 23'	Report	Esanov 19', 35'

27 December Friendly	Saudi Arabia	Cancelled	Qatar	Khobar, Saudi Arabia
--:-- UTC+3				Stadium: Aramco Stadium

=== 2027 ===
2 January Friendly	Saudi Arabia	Cancelled	Jordan	Khobar, Saudi Arabia
--:-- UTC+3				Attendance: 0

December 2027 Asian Cup Group A	Saudi Arabia	v	Palestine	Riyadh, Saudi Arabia
--:--				Stadium: King Fahd Sports City Stadium

December 2027 Asian Cup Group A	Oman	v	Saudi Arabia	Riyadh, Saudi Arabia
--:--				Stadium: King Fahd Sports City Stadium

=== 2028 ===
January 2027 Asian Cup Group A	Saudi Arabia	v	Kuwait	Jeddah, Saudi Arabia
--:--				Stadium: King Abdullah Sports City Stadium

== Coaching staff ==
Position	Name	Ref.
Head coach	(Germany) (Greece) Georgios Donis	
Assistant coaches	(Greece) Makis Angelinas	
Assistant coaches	(Saudi Arabia) Mohammed Amin	
Goalkeeping coach	(Greece) Panagiotis Maliaritsis	
Technical coach	(Saudi Arabia) Osama Hawsawi	
Fitness coach	(Greece) Giannis Stavrinos	
Trainer	(Greece) Grigoris Georgitsas	
Trainer	(Saudi Arabia) Ibrahim Al-Jalali	
Scout	(Saudi Arabia) Mohamed Al-Ghanim	
Technical director	(Morocco) Nasser Larguet	

=== Coaching history ===
No.	Coach	Nat	First match	Last match	Pld	W	D	L	Win %
1	Abdulrahman Fawzi	(Egypt)	18 October 1957	6 September 1961	6	1	1	4	16.67%
2	Ali Chaouach	(Tunisia)	1 December 1967	17 January 1969	2	1	0	1	50.00%
3	George Skinner	(England)	28 March 1970	2 April 1970	3	0	2	1	0.00%
4	Taha Ismail	(Egypt)	16 March 1972	28 March 1972	3	2	1	0	66.67%
5	Abdo Saleh El Wahsh	(Egypt)	6 March 1974	29 March 1974	6	4	1	1	66.67%
6	Ferenc Puskás	(Hungary)	21 November 1975	11 April 1976	16	5	1	10	31.25%
7	Bill McGarry	(England)	5 September 1976	22 April 1977	12	3	2	7	25.00%
8	Ronnie Allen	(England)	15 November 1978	14 December 1978	4	0	3	1	0.00%
9	David Woodfield	(England)	24 March 1979	8 April 1979	6	3	2	1	50.00%
10	Rubens Minelli	(Brazil)	30 January 1980	19 December 1981	22	9	3	10	40.91%
11	Mário Zagallo	(Brazil)	21 March 1982	17 March 1984	17	7	5	5	41.18%
12	Khalil Ibrahim Al-Zayani	(Saudi Arabia)	20 March 1984	5 April 1986	39	19	9	11	48.72%
13	Carlos Castilho	(Brazil)	7 September 1986	5 October 1986	7	4	2	1	57.14%
14	Omar Borrás	(Uruguay)	17 February 1988	18 March 1988	7	2	4	1	28.57%
15	Carlos Alberto Parreira (1)	(Brazil)	21 April 1988	28 October 1989	26	10	9	7	38.46%
16	Paulo Massa	(Brazil)	24 September 1990	1 October 1990	3	2	1	0	66.67%
17	Nelsinho Rosa	(Brazil)	11 September 1992	10 December 1992	14	7	3	4	50.00%
18	Candinho	(Brazil)	9 April 1993	24 October 1993	19	12	5	2	63.16%
19	Mohammed Al-Kharashy (1)	(Saudi Arabia)	28 October 1993	28 October 1993	1	1	0	0	100.00%
20	Leo Beenhakker	(Netherlands)	23 January 1994	9 February 1994	4	1	2	1	25.00%
21	Jorge Solari	(Argentina)	26 March 1994	3 July 1994	12	4	2	6	33.33%
22	Ivo Wortmann	(Brazil)	1 October 1994	13 October 1994	5	3	0	2	60.00%
23	Mohammed Al-Kharashy (2)	(Saudi Arabia)	19 October 1994	8 January 1995	11	6	1	4	54.54%
24	Zé Mário	(Brazil)	8 October 1995	27 October 1996	20	9	5	6	45.00%
25	Nelo Vingada	(Portugal)	6 November 1996	11 October 1997	25	16	6	3	64.00%
26	Otto Pfister (1)	(Germany)	17 October 1997	16 December 1997	8	3	2	3	37.50%
27	Carlos Alberto Parreira (2)	(Brazil)	22 February 1998	18 June 1998	10	2	4	4	20.00%
28	Mohammed Al-Kharashy (3)	(Saudi Arabia)	24 June 1998	24 June 1998	1	0	1	0	0.00%
29	Otto Pfister (2)	(Germany)	11 September 1998	11 November 1998	11	9	2	0	81.81%
30	Milan Máčala	(Czech Republic)	18 June 1999	14 October 2000	26	11	6	9	42.31%
31	Nasser Al-Johar (1)	(Saudi Arabia)	17 October 2000	19 February 2001	13	11	1	1	84.61%
32	Slobodan Santrač	(Serbia and Montenegro)	10 July 2001	24 August 2001	7	3	2	2	42.86%
33	Nasser Al-Johar (2)	(Saudi Arabia)	31 August 2001	11 June 2002	23	13	2	8	56.52%
34	Gerard van der Lem	(Netherlands)	17 December 2002	26 July 2004	26	17	6	3	65.38%
35	Martin Koopman	(Netherlands)	30 December 2002	30 December 2002	1	1	0	0	100.00%
36	Nasser Al-Johar (3)	(Saudi Arabia)	1 September 2004	17 November 2004	5	3	2	0	60.00%
37	Gabriel Calderón	(Argentina)	11 December 2004	8 December 2005	19	8	4	7	42.11%
38	Marcos Paquetá	(Brazil)	18 January 2006	27 January 2007	30	13	7	10	43.33%
39	Hélio dos Anjos	(Brazil)	24 June 2007	7 June 2008	22	15	3	4	68.18%
40	Nasser Al-Johar (4)	(Saudi Arabia)	14 June 2008	11 February 2009	18	10	5	3	55.55%
41	José Peseiro	(Portugal)	22 March 2009	9 January 2011	31	12	12	7	38.71%
42	Nasser Al-Johar (5)	(Saudi Arabia)	13 January 2011	17 January 2011	2	0	0	2	0.00%
43	Rogério Lourenço	(Brazil)	13 July 2011	28 July 2011	4	2	1	1	50.00%
44	Frank Rijkaard	(Netherlands)	2 September 2011	12 January 2013	17	4	6	7	23.53%
45	Khalid Al-Koroni	(Saudi Arabia)	9 December 2012	15 December 2012	3	1	1	1	33.33%
46	Juan Ramón López Caro	(Spain)	6 February 2013	26 November 2014	19	9	4	6	47.37%
47	Cosmin Olăroiu	(Romania)	30 December 2014	18 January 2015	4	1	0	3	25.00%
48	Faisal Al Baden	(Saudi Arabia)	30 March 2015	11 June 2015	2	2	0	0	100.00%
49	Bert van Marwijk	(Netherlands)	3 September 2015	9 November 2017	20	13	4	3	65.00%
50	Edgardo Bauza	(Argentina)	10 November 2017	13 November 2017	2	0	0	2	0.00%
51	Krunoslav Jurčić	(Croatia)	22 December 2017	28 December 2017	3	1	1	1	33.33%
52	Juan Antonio Pizzi	(Spain)	26 February 2018	21 January 2019	22	7	5	10	31.82%
53	Youssef Anbar	(Saudi Arabia)	21 March 2019	25 March 2019	2	1	0	1	50.00%
54	Hervé Renard (1)	(France)	5 September 2019	28 March 2023	45	20	10	15	44.45%
55	Laurent Bonadéi (Note: The assistant coach, Laurent Bonadéi took charge of the national team temporarily for the 2021 FIFA Arab Cup.)	(France)	1 December 2021	7 December 2021	3	0	1	2	0.00%
56	Saad Al-Shehri (Note: The assistant coach, Saad Al-Shehri took charge of the national team temporarily for the 25th Arabian Gulf Cup. He was once again named interim coach following Hervé Renard's resignation.)	(Saudi Arabia)	6 January 2023	23 August 2023	3	1	0	2	33.33%
57	Roberto Mancini	(Italy)	28 August 2023	24 October 2024	20	8	7	5	38.89%
58	Hervé Renard (2)	(France)	27 October 2024	17 April 2026	21	10	5	6	47.62%
58	Georgios Donis	(Germany) (Greece)	23 April 2026		12	6	4	2	50.45%

== Players ==
=== Current squad ===
The following players were called up to the friendly matches against South Korea and Uzbekistan on 13 and 17 November 2026, respectively Caps and goals correct as of 17 November 2026, after the match against Uzbekistan.

No.	Pos.	Player	Date of birth (age)	Caps	Goals	Club
	GK	Mohammed Al-Owais	10 October 1991 (age 35)	74	0	(Saudi Arabian Football Federation) Al-Hilal
	GK	Abdulquddus Atiah	1 March 1997 (age 29)	3	0	(Saudi Arabian Football Federation) Al-Ula
	GK	Hamed Al-Shanqiti	26 April 2005 (age 21)	1	0	(Saudi Arabian Football Federation) Al-Kholood
	DF	Hassan Al-Tambakti	9 February 1999 (age 27)	62	1	(Saudi Arabian Football Federation) Al-Hilal
	DF	Saud Abdulhamid	18 July 1999 (age 27)	60	1	(French Football Federation) Lens
	DF	Abdulelah Al-Amri	15 January 1997 (age 29)	53	3	(Saudi Arabian Football Federation) Al-Nassr
	DF	Nawaf Boushal	16 September 1999 (age 27)	33	0	(Saudi Arabian Football Federation) Al-Nassr
	DF	Ali Lajami	24 April 1996 (age 30)	29	1	(Saudi Arabian Football Federation) Al-Hilal
	DF	Moteb Al-Harbi	20 February 2000 (age 26)	23	0	(Saudi Arabian Football Federation) Al-Hilal
	FW	Mohammed Abu Al-Shamat	11 August 2002 (age 24)	17	0	(Saudi Arabian Football Federation) Al-Qadsiah
	DF	Mohammed Mahzari	19 May 1999 (age 27)	5	0	(Saudi Arabian Football Federation) Al-Hilal
	DF	Faris Abdi	9 May 1999 (age 27)	3	0	(Saudi Arabian Football Federation) Al-Ittihad
	DF	Abdulmalik Al-Oyayari	10 December 2003 (age 22)	1	0	(Saudi Arabian Football Federation) Neom
	DF	Sultan Tankar	1 September 1998 (age 28)	1	0	(Saudi Arabian Football Federation) Al-Hazem
	DF	Abdullah Al-Khateeb	12 March 1995 (age 31)	1	0	(Saudi Arabian Football Federation) Al-Ettifaq Club
	MF	Mohamed Kanno	22 September 1994 (age 32)	88	9	(Saudi Arabian Football Federation) Al-Hilal
	MF	Nasser Al-Dawsari	19 December 1998 (age 27)	57	1	(Saudi Arabian Football Federation) Al-Hilal
	MF	Abdullah Al-Khaibari	16 August 1996 (age 30)	49	0	(Saudi Arabian Football Federation) Al-Nassr
	MF	Musab Al-Juwayr	20 June 2003 (age 23)	42	6	(Saudi Arabian Football Federation) Al-Qadsiah
	MF	Mukhtar Ali	30 October 1997 (age 29)	19	0	(Saudi Arabian Football Federation) Al-Ittihad
	MF	Ziyad Al-Johani	11 November 2001 (age 25)	14	0	(Saudi Arabian Football Federation) Al-Ahli
	MF	Turki Al-Ammar	23 September 1999 (age 27)	13	1	(Saudi Arabian Football Federation) Al-Qadsiah
	MF	Mohammed al-Qahtani	23 July 2002 (age 24)	12	0	(Saudi Arabian Football Federation) Al-Qadsiah
	MF	Ahmed Al-Ghamdi	21 September 2001 (age 25)	5	0	(Saudi Arabian Football Federation) Al-Ittihad
	FW	Firas Al-Buraikan	14 May 2000 (age 26)	81	20	(Saudi Arabian Football Federation) Al-Ahli
	FW	Abdullah Al-Hamdan	13 September 1999 (age 27)	62	14	(Saudi Arabian Football Federation) Al-Nassr
	FW	Marwan Al-Sahafi	17 February 2004 (age 22)	18	1	(Saudi Arabian Football Federation) Al-Ittihad
	FW	Sultan Mandash	17 October 1994 (age 32)	13	2	(Saudi Arabian Football Federation) Al-Hilal
	FW	Mohammed Al-Kuwaykibi	2 December 1994 (age 31)	10	0	(Saudi Arabian Football Federation) Al-Taawoun FC
	FW	Abdullah Al-Salem	19 December 1992 (age 33)	6	1	(Saudi Arabian Football Federation) Al-Qadsiah

=== Recent call-ups ===
The following players have also been called up to the Saudi Arabia squad within the last 12 months.

Pos.	Player	Date of birth (age)	Caps	Goals	Club	Latest call-up
GK	Nawaf Al-Aqidi	10 May 2000 (age 26)	25	0	(Saudi Arabia) Al-Nassr	2026 Gulf Cup ^{INJ}
GK	Ahmed Al-Kassar	8 May 1991 (age 35)	9	0	(Saudi Arabia) Al-Qadsiah	2026 FIFA World Cup
GK	Mohammed Al-Rubaie	14 August 1997 (age 29)	7	0	(Saudi Arabia) Al-Hilal	v. Serbia, 31 March 2026
GK	Abdulrahman Al-Sanbi	3 February 2001 (age 25)	3	0	(Saudi Arabia) Al-Ahli	2025 FIFA Arab Cup
GK	Raghed Al-Najjar	20 September 1996 (age 30)	1	0	Free Agent	2025 FIFA Arab Cup
DF	Hassan Kadesh	27 September 1992 (age 34)	23	3	(Saudi Arabia) Al-Ittihad	2026 Gulf Cup
DF	Jehad Thakri	21 July 2001 (age 25)	12	0	(Saudi Arabia) Al-Qadsiah	2026 Gulf Cup
DF	Rayan Hamed	13 April 2002 (age 24)	5	0	(Saudi Arabia) Al-Ahli	2026 Gulf Cup
DF	Zakaria Hawsawi	12 January 2001 (age 25)	3	0	(Saudi Arabia) Al-Ahli	2026 Gulf Cup
DF	Ali Majrashi	2 October 1999 (age 27)	21	0	(Saudi Arabia) Al-Ahli	2026 FIFA World Cup
DF	Muteb Al-Mufarrij	19 August 1996 (age 30)	5	0	(Saudi Arabia) Al-Taawoun	v. Serbia, 31 March 2026
DF	Khalifah Al-Dawsari	2 January 1999 (age 27)	2	0	(Saudi Arabia) Neom	v. Serbia, 31 March 2026
DF	Waleed Al-Ahmed	3 May 1999 (age 27)	8	0	(Saudi Arabia) Al-Qadsiah	2025 FIFA Arab Cup
DF	Mohammed Sulaiman	8 April 2004 (age 22)	5	0	(Saudi Arabia) Al-Ahli	2025 FIFA Arab Cup
MF	Salem Al-Dawsari	19 August 1991 (age 35)	114	27	(Saudi Arabia) Al-Hilal	2026 FIFA World Cup
MF	Ayman Yahya	14 May 2001 (age 25)	26	0	(Saudi Arabia) Al-Nassr	2026 FIFA World Cup
MF	Alaa Al-Hejji	3 December 1995 (age 30)	7	0	(Saudi Arabia) Neom	2026 Gulf Cup
MF	Salman Al-Faraj	1 August 1989 (age 37)	75	9	Free Agent	v. Serbia, 31 March 2026
MF	Naif Masoud	8 March 2001 (age 25)	5	0	(Saudi Arabia) Al-Ahli	v. Serbia, 31 March 2026
MF	Mohammed Al-Majhad	16 July 1998 (age 28)	2	0	(Saudi Arabia) Al-Ula	v. Serbia, 31 March 2026
MF	Murad Hawsawi	3 June 2001 (age 25)	2	0	(Saudi Arabia) Al-Hilal	v. Serbia, 31 March 2026
MF	Abdulaziz Al-Aliwa	11 February 2004 (age 22)	1	0	(Saudi Arabia) Al-Qadsiah	v. Serbia, 31 March 2026
MF	Mohammed Al-Yami	4 February 2002 (age 24)	0	0	(Saudi Arabia) Al-Hazem	v. Serbia, 31 March 2026
MF	Abdulrahman Al-Aboud	1 June 1995 (age 31)	18	2	(Saudi Arabia) Al-Shabab	2025 FIFA Arab Cup
FW	Saleh Al-Shehri	1 November 1993 (age 33)	59	19	(Saudi Arabia) Al-Ittihad	2026 FIFA World Cup
FW	Saleh Abu Al-Shamat	11 August 2002 (age 24)	16	2	(Saudi Arabia) Al-Ahli	2026 Gulf Cup
FW	Hammam Al-Hammami	30 January 2004 (age 22)	5	1	(Saudi Arabia) Al-Shabab	2026 Gulf Cup
FW	Khalid Al-Ghannam	8 November 2000 (age 26)	8	0	(Saudi Arabia) Al-Ettifaq	2026 FIFA World Cup
^{INJ} Player withdrew from the squad due to an injury.; ^{PRE} Preliminary squad.; ^{RET} Retired from the national team.; ^{SUS} Player is serving a suspension.; ^{WD} Player withdrew from the squad due to non-injury issue.

== Player records ==
As of 26 June 2026
Statistics include official FIFA-recognised matches only
Players in bold are still active with Saudi Arabia.

=== Most appearances ===
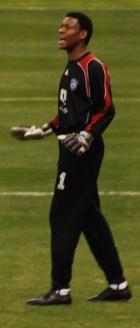
Mohamed Al-Deayea is Saudi Arabia's most capped player with 173 appearances.

Rank	Player	Caps	Goals	Career
1	Mohamed Al-Deayea (Note: Some sources have Al-Deayea listed with 178 appearances but this includes matches played against Olympic sides, matches that are not considered official for his teammates Sami Al-Jaber or Abdullah Zubromawi.)	173	0	1993–2006
2	Mohammed Al-Khilaiwi	163	3	1990–2001
3	Sami Al-Jaber	156	46	1992–2006
4	Abdullah Zubromawi	142	3	1993–2002
5	Hussein Abdulghani	138	5	1996–2018
5	Osama Hawsawi	138	7	2006–2018
7	Taisir Al-Jassim	134	19	2004–2018
8	Saud Kariri	133	7	2001–2015
9	Mohamed Abd Al-Jawad	121	7	1981–1994
10	Mohammad Al-Shalhoub	118	19	2000–2018

=== Top goalscorers ===
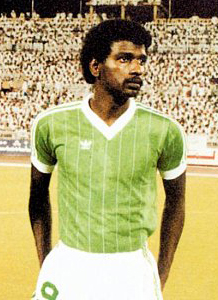
Majed Abdullah is Saudi Arabia's top scorer with 72 goals.

Rank	Player	Goals	Caps	Ratio	Career
1	Majed Abdullah	72	116	0.61	1978–1994
2	Sami Al-Jaber	46	156	0.29	1992–2006
3	Yasser Al-Qahtani	42	108	0.39	2002–2013
4	Obeid Al-Dosari	41	94	0.44	1994–2002
5	Talal Al-Meshal	32	60	0.53	1998–2006
6	Mohammad Al-Sahlawi	28	42	0.67	2010–2018
6	Khaled Al-Muwallid	28	114	0.25	1988–1998
8	**Salem Al-Dawsari**	27	114	0.24	2012–present
9	Hamzah Idris	26	66	0.39	1992–2000
9	Fahad Al-Mehallel	26	87	0.3	1992–1999

== Competitive record ==
*Denotes draws includes knockout matches decided via penalty shoot-out. Red border indicates that the tournament was hosted on home soil. Gold, silver, bronze backgrounds indicate 1st, 2nd and 3rd place finishes respectively. Bold text indicates best finish in tournament.

Champion Runners-up Third place

Overview
Event	1st Place	2nd Place	3rd Place
Confederations Cup	0	1	0
Asian Cup	3	3	0
Arab Cup	2	1	2
Arabian Gulf Cup	4	7	8
Asian Games	0	1	1
Arab Games	1	1	1
Total	10	14	12

=== FIFA World Cup ===
FIFA World Cup record									Qualification record						
Year	Round	Pos.	Pld	W	D	L	GF	GA	Pld	W	D	L	GF	GA	Campaign
(Uruguay) 1930	Not a FIFA member								Not a FIFA member						
(Italy) 1934	Not a FIFA member								Not a FIFA member						
(France) 1938	Not a FIFA member								Not a FIFA member						
(Brazil) 1950	Not a FIFA member								Not a FIFA member						
(Switzerland) 1954	Not a FIFA member								Not a FIFA member						
(Sweden) 1958	Did not enter								Did not enter						
(Chile) 1962	Did not enter								Did not enter						
(England) 1966	Did not enter								Did not enter						
(Mexico) 1970	Did not enter								Did not enter						
(West Germany) 1974	Did not enter								Did not enter						
(Argentina) 1978	Did not qualify								4	1	0	3	3	7	1978
(Spain) 1982	Did not qualify								10	4	1	5	9	16	1982
(Mexico) 1986	Did not qualify								2	0	1	1	0	1	1986
(Italy) 1990	Did not qualify								9	4	3	2	11	9	1990
(United States) 1994	**Round of 16**	**12th**	4	2	0	2	5	6	11	6	5	0	28	7	1994
(France) 1998	Group stage	28th	3	0	1	2	2	7	14	9	3	2	26	7	1998
(South Korea) (Japan) 2002	Group stage	32nd	3	0	0	3	0	12	14	11	2	1	47	8	2002
(Germany) 2006	Group stage	28th	3	0	1	2	2	7	12	10	2	0	24	2	2006
(South Africa) 2010	Did not qualify								16	8	5	3	25	15	2010
(Brazil) 2014	Did not qualify								8	3	3	2	14	7	2014
(Russia) 2018	Group stage	26th	3	1	0	2	2	7	18	12	3	3	45	14	2018
(Qatar) 2022	Group stage	25th	3	1	0	2	3	5	18	13	4	1	34	10	2022
(Canada) (Mexico) (United States) 2026	Group stage	38th	3	0	2	1	1	5	18	8	6	4	22	13	2026
(Morocco) (Portugal) (Spain) 2030	To be determined								To be determined						2030
(Saudi Arabia) 2034	Qualified as hosts								Qualified as hosts						
Total: 8/19	Round of 16	12th	22	4	4	14	15	49	154	89	38	27	288	116	—

=== AFC Asian Cup ===
AFC Asian Cup record									Qualification record					
Year	Result	Position	Pld	W	D	L	GF	GA	Pld	W	D	L	GF	GA
(Hong Kong) 1956	Not an AFC member								Not an AFC member					
(South Korea) 1960	Not an AFC member								Not an AFC member					
(Israel) 1964	Not an AFC member								Not an AFC member					
(Iran) 1968	Not an AFC member								Not an AFC member					
(Thailand) 1972	Not an AFC member								Not an AFC member					
(Iran) 1976	Qualified but withdrew								6	3	1	2	12	5
(Kuwait) 1980	Withdrew								Withdrew					
(Singapore) 1984	**Champions**	**1st**	**6**	**3**	**3**	**0**	**7**	**3**	4	4	0	0	19	0
(Qatar) 1988	**Champions**	**1st**	**6**	**3**	**3**	**0**	**5**	**1**	Automatic qualification as champions					
(Japan) 1992	**Runners-up**	**2nd**	**5**	**2**	**2**	**1**	**8**	**3**	Automatic qualification as champions					
(United Arab Emirates) 1996	**Champions**	**1st**	**6**	**3**	**2**	**1**	**11**	**6**	4	4	0	0	10	0
(Lebanon) 2000	**Runners-up**	**2nd**	**6**	**3**	**1**	**2**	**11**	**8**	Automatic qualification as champions					
(China) 2004	Group stage	13th	3	0	1	2	3	5	6	6	0	0	31	1
(Indonesia) (Malaysia) (Thailand) (Vietnam) 2007	**Runners-up**	**2nd**	**6**	**4**	**1**	**1**	**12**	**6**	6	5	0	1	21	4
(Qatar) 2011	Group stage	15th	3	0	0	3	1	8	Automatic qualification as runners-up					
(Australia) 2015	Group stage	10th	3	1	0	2	5	5	6	5	1	0	9	3
(United Arab Emirates) 2019	Round of 16	12th	4	2	0	2	6	3	8	6	2	0	28	4
(Qatar) 2023	Round of 16	9th	4	2	2	0	5	2	8	6	2	0	22	4
(Saudi Arabia) 2027	Qualified as hosts								6	4	1	1	12	3
Total	3 Titles	12/19	52	23	15	14	74	50	54	43	7	4	164	24

=== Olympic Games ===
- Football at the 1976 Summer Olympics – Men's Asian Qualifiers
- Football at the 1984 Summer Olympics – Men's Asian Qualifiers
- Football at the 1988 Summer Olympics – Men's Asian Qualifiers

=== CONCACAF Gold Cup ===
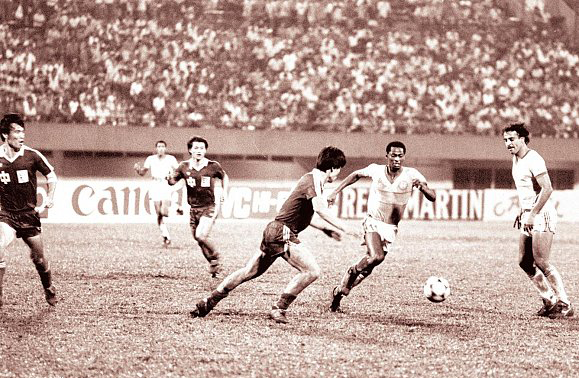
The final of the 1984 AFC Asian Cup, against China. Saudi Arabia won their first AFC Asian Cup in their first appearance in the competition.

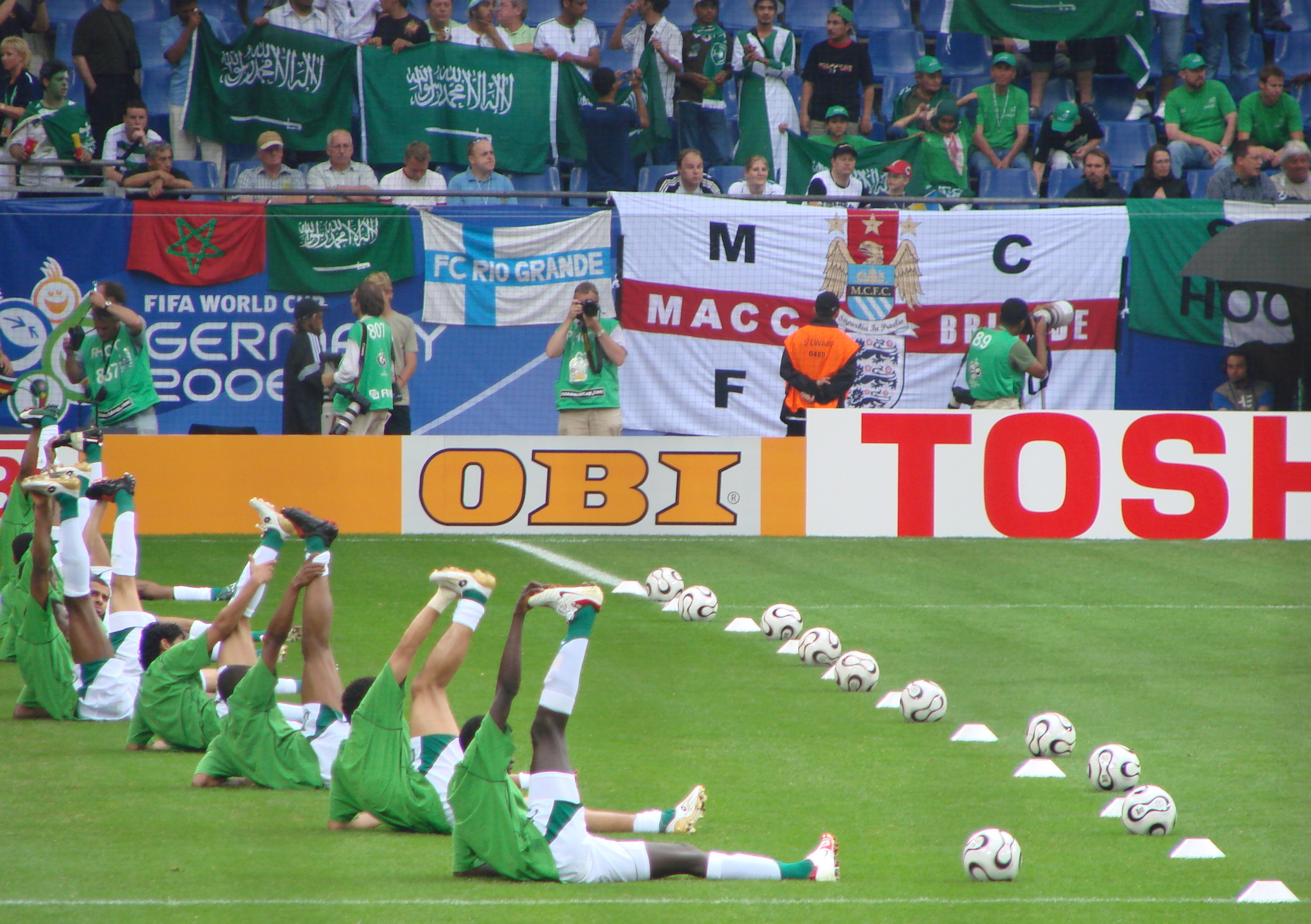
Saudi players warm-up before their match against Ukraine during the 2006 FIFA World Cup on 19 June.

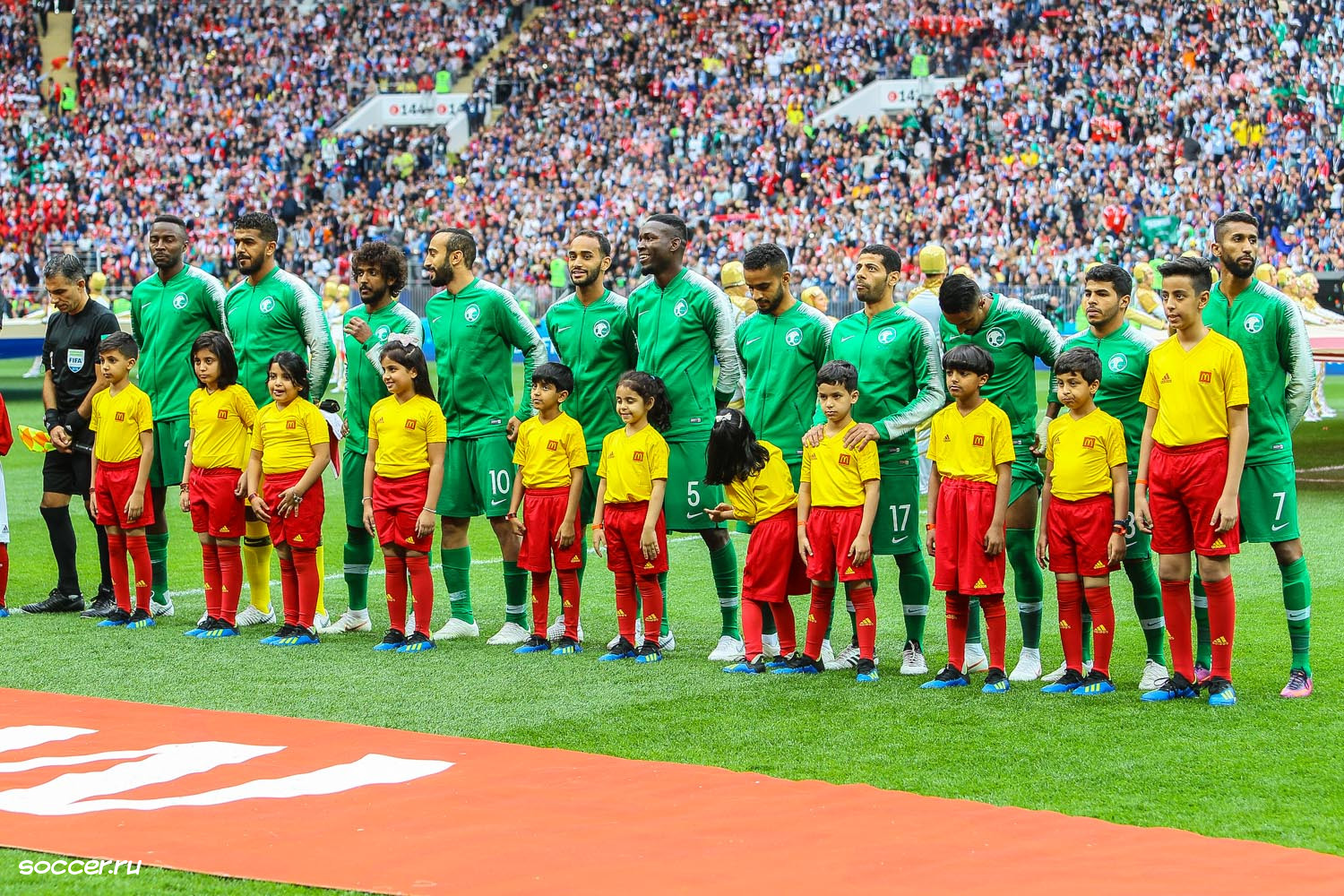
Saudi Arabia before the 2018 FIFA World Cup opening fixture, against hosts Russia in Group A.

CONCACAF Gold Cup record
Year	Round	Pos.	Pld	W	D	L	GF	GA
(Canada) (United States) 2025	Quarter-finals	8th	4	1	1	2	2	4
Total	Quarter-finals	1/28	4	1	1	2	2	4

=== FIFA Arab Cup ===
FIFA Arab Cup record
Year	Result	Pld	W	D	L	GF	GA
(Lebanon) 1963	Did not enter						
(Kuwait) 1964	Did not enter						
(Iraq) 1966	Did not enter						
(Saudi Arabia) 1985	**Third place**	**4**	**2**	**1**	**1**	**7**	**3**
(Jordan) 1988	Group stage	4	0	2	2	1	4
(Syria) 1992	**Runners-up**	**4**	**2**	**1**	**1**	**7**	**5**
(Qatar) 1998	**Champions**	**4**	**4**	**0**	**0**	**12**	**3**
(Kuwait) 2002	**Champions**	**6**	**5**	**1**	**0**	**11**	**3**
2009	Cancelled						
(Saudi Arabia) 2012	**Fourth place**	**4**	**1**	**1**	**2**	**6**	**5**
(Qatar) 2021	Group stage	3	0	1	2	1	3
(Qatar) 2025	**Third place**	**5**	**3**	**0**	**2**	**7**	**5**
Total	8/11	34	17	7	10	52	31

=== WAFF Championship ===
WAFF Championship record
Year	Round	Pld	W	D	L	GF	GA
(Jordan) 2000	Did not participate						
(Syria) 2002	Did not participate						
(Iran) 2004	Did not participate						
(Jordan) 2007	Did not participate						
(Iran) 2008	Did not participate						
(Jordan) 2010	Did not participate						
(Kuwait) 2012	Group stage	3	1	1	1	1	1
(Qatar) 2014	Group stage	2	0	1	1	1	4
(Iraq) 2019	Group stage	3	0	1	2	1	5
(Oman) 2026	Qualified						
Total	4/10	8	1	3	4	3	10

=== Arabian Gulf Cup ===
Arabian Gulf Cup record
Year	Result	Position	Pld	W	D	L	GF	GA
(Bahrain) 1970	**Third place**	**3rd**	**3**	**0**	**2**	**1**	**2**	**4**
(Saudi Arabia) 1972	**Runners-up**	**2nd**	**3**	**2**	**1**	**0**	**10**	**2**
(Kuwait) 1974	**Runners-up**	**2nd**	**4**	**3**	**0**	**1**	**9**	**6**
(Qatar) 1976	Group stage	5th	6	2	0	4	8	14
(Iraq) 1979	**Third place**	**3rd**	**6**	**3**	**2**	**1**	**14**	**4**
(United Arab Emirates) 1982	Group stage	4th	5	2	1	2	6	4
(Oman) 1984	**Third place**	**3rd**	**6**	**3**	**1**	**2**	**9**	**8**
(Bahrain) 1986	**Third place**	**3rd**	**6**	**3**	**0**	**3**	**9**	**9**
(Saudi Arabia) 1988	**Third place**	**3rd**	**6**	**2**	**3**	**1**	**5**	**4**
(Kuwait) 1990	Withdrew							
(Qatar) 1992	**Third place**	**3rd**	**5**	**3**	**0**	**2**	**6**	**4**
(United Arab Emirates) 1994	**Champions**	**1st**	**5**	**4**	**1**	**0**	**10**	**4**
(Oman) 1996	**Third place**	**3rd**	**5**	**2**	**2**	**1**	**8**	**6**
(Bahrain) 1998	**Runners-up**	**2nd**	**5**	**3**	**2**	**0**	**5**	**2**
(Saudi Arabia) 2002	**Champions**	**1st**	**5**	**4**	**1**	**0**	**10**	**3**
(Kuwait) 2003–04	**Champions**	**1st**	**6**	**4**	**2**	**0**	**8**	**2**
(Qatar) 2004	Group stage	5th	3	1	0	2	4	5
(United Arab Emirates) 2007	**Third place**	**3rd**	**4**	**2**	**1**	**1**	**4**	**3**
(Oman) 2009	**Runners-up**	**2nd**	**5**	**3**	**2**	**0**	**10**	**0**
(Yemen) 2010	**Runners-up**	**2nd**	**5**	**2**	**2**	**1**	**6**	**2**
(Bahrain) 2013	Group stage	5th	3	1	0	2	2	3
(Saudi Arabia) 2014	**Runners-up**	**2nd**	**5**	**3**	**1**	**1**	**9**	**5**
(Kuwait) 2017–18	Group stage	6th	3	1	1	1	2	3
(Qatar) 2019	**Runners-up**	**2nd**	**5**	**3**	**0**	**2**	**7**	**5**
(Iraq) 2023	Group stage	6th	3	1	0	2	3	4
(Kuwait) 2024–25	**Semi-finals**	**3rd**	**4**	**2**	**0**	**2**	**9**	**8**
(Saudi Arabia) 2026	**Champions**	**1st**	**5**	**4**	**1**	**0**	**8**	**0**
Total	4 Titles	26/27	121	67	26	32	183	114

=== Arab Games ===
Arab Games record
Year	Result	Pld	W	D	L	GF	GA
(Egypt) 1953	Did not enter						
(Lebanon) 1957	Group stage	3	1	1	1	4	3
(Morocco) 1961	Fifth place	5	1	0	4	4	38
(United Arab Republic) 1965	Did not enter						
(Syria) 1976	**Runners-up**	**6**	**3**	**1**	**2**	**9**	**4**
(Morocco) 1985	**Fourth place**	**4**	**3**	**0**	**1**	**6**	**3**
(Lebanon) 1997	Did not enter						
(Jordan) 1999	First round	2	0	1	1	2	3
(Egypt) 2007	**Third place**	**4**	**1**	**1**	**2**	**5**	**5**
(Qatar) 2011	First round	2	0	1	1	0	2
2023–present	See Saudi Arabia national under-23 football team						
Total	7/10	26	9	5	12	30	58

=== Asian Games ===
Asian Games record
Year	Round	Position	Pld	W	D	L	GF	GA
(India) 1951	Did not enter							
(Philippines) 1954	Did not enter							
(Japan) 1958	Did not enter							
(Indonesia) 1962	Did not enter							
(Thailand) 1966	Did not enter							
(Thailand) 1970	Did not enter							
(Iran) 1974	Did not enter							
(Thailand) 1978	Group stage	10th	3	0	2	1	3	4
(India) 1982	Semi-finals	**Third place**	**6**	**3**	**2**	**1**	**7**	**4**
(South Korea) 1986	Final	**Runners-up**	**6**	**3**	**2**	**1**	**9**	**6**
(China) 1990	Quarter-finals	5th	3	2	1	0	6	0
(Japan) 1994	Quarter-finals	5th	5	3	0	2	9	10
(Thailand) 1998	Did not enter							
2002–present	See Saudi Arabia national under-23 football team							
Total	Final	5/13	23	11	7	5	34	24

=== FIFA Confederations Cup ===
FIFA Confederations Cup record
Year	Round	Position	Pld	W	D	L	GF	GA
(Saudi Arabia) 1992	**Runners-up**	**2nd**	**2**	**1**	**0**	**1**	**4**	**3**
(Saudi Arabia) 1995	Group stage	5th	2	0	0	2	0	4
(Saudi Arabia) 1997	Group stage	7th	3	1	0	2	1	8
(Mexico) 1999	Fourth place	4th	5	1	1	3	8	16
(South Korea) (Japan) 2001	Did not qualify							
(France) 2003	Did not qualify							
(Germany) 2005	Did not qualify							
(South Africa) 2009	Did not qualify							
(Brazil) 2013	Did not qualify							
(Russia) 2017	Did not qualify							
Total	Runners-up	4/10	12	3	1	8	13	31

== All-time results ==
The following table shows Saudi Arabia's all-time international record, correct as of 3 October 2026.

Against	Played	Won	Drawn	Lost	GF	GA	GD
Total	772	359	178	224	1147	810	+337

== Honours ==
=== Global ===
- FIFA Confederations Cup
  - Runners-up (1): 1992

=== Intercontinental ===
- Afro-Asian Cup of Nations
  - Runners-up (2): 1985, 1997

=== Continental ===
- AFC Asian Cup
  - Champions (3): 1984, 1988, 1996
  - Runners-up (3): 1992, 2000, 2007
- Asian Games (Note: Competition organized by OCA, officially not recognized by FIFA.)
  - Silver medal (1): 1986
  - Bronze medal (1): 1982

=== Regional ===
- Arabian Gulf Cup
  - Champions (4): 1994, 2002, 2003–04, 2026
  - Runners-up (7): 1972, 1974, 1998, 2009, 2010, 2014, 2019
  - Third place (9): 1970, 1979, 1984, 1986, 1988, 1992, 1996, 2007, 2024–25
- Arab Cup (Note: Official subregional competition organized and recognized by FIFA since 2021. Previous editions were organized by UAFA.)
  - Champions (2): 1998, 2002
  - Runners-up (1): 1992 (Note: The 1992 Arab Cup also counted as an edition of the Arab Games.)
  - Third place (2): 1985, 2025
- Arab Games
  - Silver medal (2): 1976, 1992
  - Bronze medal (1): 2007
- Islamic Solidarity Games
  - Gold medal (1): 2005
- Islamic Games
  - Bronze medal (1): 1980

=== Awards ===
- AFC National Team of the Year (1): 1996
- AFC Asian Cup Fair Play Award (1): 2000

=== Summary ===
Only official honours are included, according to FIFA statutes (competitions organized/recognized by FIFA or an affiliated confederation).

Competition	1st place, gold medalist(s)	2nd place, silver medalist(s)	3rd place, bronze medalist(s)	Total
FIFA Confederations Cup	0	1	0	1
AFC Asian Cup	3	3	0	6
Afro-Asian Cup of Nations	0	2	0	2
Arab Cup / FIFA Arab Cup	2	0	1	1
Total	5	6	1	10

== Titles ==
=== AFC Asian Cup ===
Preceded by 1980 Kuwait	Asian Cup Champions; 1984 (First title); 1988 (Second title)	Succeeded by 1992 Japan
Preceded by 1992 Japan	Asian Cup Champions; 1996 (Third title)	Succeeded by 2000 Japan

=== Arab Cup ===
Preceded by 1992 Egypt	Arab Cup Champions; 1998 (First title); 2002 (Second title)	Succeeded by 2012 Morocco

=== Arabian Gulf Cup ===
Preceded by 1992 Qatar	Arabian Gulf Cup Champions; 1994 (First title)	Succeeded by 1996 Kuwait
Preceded by 1998 Kuwait	Arabian Gulf Cup Champions; 2002 (Second title); 2003–04 (Third title)	Succeeded by 2004 Qatar
Preceded by 2024–25 Bahrain	Arabian Gulf Cup Champions; 2026 (Fourth title)	Succeeded by 2028 TBA
