= Muhieddine Itani =

Lebanese footballer (1929–2015)

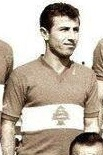
- Itani with Lebanon at the 1966 Arab Cup

Personal information
- Full name: Muhieddine Abdul Razzak Itani
- Date of birth: 6 September 1929
- Place of birth: Ras Beirut, Beirut, Lebanese Republic
- Date of death: 5 August 2015 (aged 85)
- Place of death: Beirut, Lebanon
- Height: 1.61 m (5 ft 3 in)
- Position: Full-back

Youth career
- Nejmeh

Senior career*
Years	Team	Apps	(Gls)
1950–1959	Nejmeh		
1959–1960s	Racing Beirut		
1960s	Tadamon Beirut		
1960s–1969	Nejmeh		

International career
1959–1967	Lebanon	11+	(1+)
- * Club domestic league appearances and goals

Muhieddine Abdul Razzak Itani (Arabic: محيي الدين عبد الرزاق عيتاني; 6 September 1929 – 5 August 2015), also known as Tabello (Arabic: طابلو), was a Lebanese footballer who played as a full-back.

In the early 1950s, Itani began his senior club career at Nejmeh, helping the team gain promotion to the Lebanese Premier League. In 1959, he moved to Racing Beirut, who won the league in the 1964–65 season, before playing for Tadamon Beirut. He then returned to Nejmeh, where he was the top goalscorer in the Lebanese Premier League in the 1968–69 season. Itani also played for Lebanon at international level, representing the country in the Arab Cup in the 1960s.

Itani was known for his technique and agility, as well as for his skill in controlling the ball in unconventional ways. He was an ambidextrous, offensive full-back who was capable of playing on both flanks. Despite being only 1.61 m (5.3 ft) tall, Itani could jump to reach high balls. He was also known for his off-field antics; he would play practical jokes, especially on trips abroad with his teams.

== Early life ==
Muhieddine Itani was born in Ras Beirut, Beirut, Lebanon, on 6 September 1929. In the winters, he spent time fishing with his father Abdul Razzak and in the summers he went swimming. His father would send him to Sheikh Mohammed Itani to learn to read, write, and memorize the Quran. Itani, however, often ran away from school to spend time playing football in the Nejmeh Stadium. Itani was expelled from school multiple times, remaining illiterate throughout his life.

Every afternoon while training at Nejmeh, Itani would see an Englishman called Chance watching him and his teammates train. One day, Chance asked Itani to train in private with him; Itani did "not hesitate to accept his offer". Itani trained at least four hours a day with Chance. Itani said that his training sessions with Chance developed him as a footballer and he learned the fundamentals of the sport.

== Club career ==
Itani began his senior club career in the early 1950s with Nejmeh under coach Salah Itani. He helped Nejmeh gain promotion to the 1953–54 Lebanese Premier League for the first time after winning the Lebanese Second Division in 1952. Itani's first game in the Premier League ended in a 3–0 win against Racing Beirut in which he scored a penalty kick.

In 1959, Racing Beirut purchased Itani, who was paid £L20,000, an Audi car, and a Vespa scooter, and secured a job at the Regie Company. He was part of the team that won the 1964–65 Lebanese Premier League. In the 1960s, Itani moved to Tadamon Beirut, before rejoining Nejmeh. He was the Lebanese Premier League's top goalscorer of the 1968–69 season, scoring 15 goals.

== International career ==
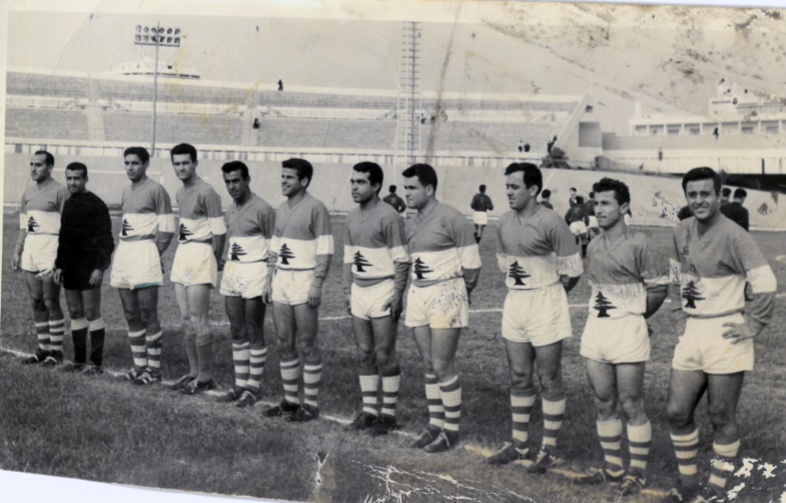
Itani (second from right) with Lebanon at the 1963 Arab Cup

Despite playing in the Lebanese Second Division with Nejmeh in the early 1950s, Itani attracted the attention of the Lebanese national team coach and was called up. On 17 May 1961, he represented Lebanon in an unofficial friendly against Brazil. Itani was part of the team that played in the 1963 Arab Cup, which was held in Lebanon; he played in the opening game of the tournament, a 6–0 win over Kuwait, and scored an own goal for Tunisia in a game that ended in a 1–0 defeat.

Itani's most memorable game was a 1–0 win against Libya on 8 March 1964, at the 1964 Tripoli Fair Tournament. He scored the game's only goal through a penalty kick in the final minute. Muhieddine stated he deceived the goalkeeper by "looking at the referee as if [he] was talking to him"; the goalkeeper was "busy looking at the goalposts" and "only noticed that the goal was scored when the crowd started cheering".

== Style of play ==
Due to his ambidexterity, Itani played both as a left-back and a right-back. He was a penalty-kick specialist who was noted for his technique and his movements. He controlled the ball in unique ways, stopping it with both feet or with his lower back. Despite his short stature of 1.61 m (5.3 ft), Itani had a high elevation, which enabled him to reach higher balls. Although he played in a more defensive role, often Itani used fast offensive breaks. Once he had already dribbled an opponent, he would often go back to dribble him again because "the spectators enjoyed it". He was also known for his shooting skills.

== After football ==
After retiring from football, Itani was a long-distance swimmer who was considered to be the only swimmer in Lebanon to participate in every national race, competing symbolically during his old age. In the 2008 annual Christmas race held by the Al Jazeera Sporting Club, at the age of 80, he was the eldest of the 112 participants.

== Personal life ==
Itani was nicknamed Tabello (Arabic: طابللو) and was known for his humility and eagerness to help. He was also famous for his pranks, which he especially perpetrated on trips abroad with his football teams. During the 1961 Pan Arab Games, held in Morocco, the national team manager Joseph Nalbandian promised each player he would receive US$3 for every day spent in the tournament. Following the tournament, because the players had not received their tournament bonus, Itani and his teammates came up with a plan. Itani stripped naked in front of a balcony on the third floor of the University of Casablanca, where the national team was residing during the tournament. Passers-by who overlooked the balcony would complain about Itani's nakedness to the hotel manager. The manager spoke to Nalbandian, who asked Itani to "wear his clothes", giving him the money.

Itani traveled with the Lebanese national team to Tunis, Tunisia, to play a friendly game on 9 June 1963 against the Tunisian national team. The Lebanese team was well-received by the local Tunisians; among whom was a mizmar player wearing a skirt. The Lebanese players were annoyed by the mizmar player and asked Itani to ask him to leave. Itani started dancing next to him and put his hand below the musician's skirt. The mizmar player continued to play while jumping up and down; the players were overwhelmed with laughter.

In 1959, as part of his transfer to Racing Beirut, Itani was hired by the Regie Company. In 1970, Itani established a fish shop in the Commodore area of Hamra, Beirut; in the 1990s he moved to the city's Karakas neighborhood and opened a fish shop called "Al Kalaa Fishery" (Arabic: مسمكة القلعة, lit. 'The Castle Fishery'). Itani's favourite players were Mahmoud Berjawi and Mardek Chabarian in Lebanon, and Pelé globally. His favourite coach was Ion Bogdan during his time at Racing Beirut.

Itani, who had eight children, died on 5 August 2015 aged 85.

== Honours ==
Nejmeh

- Lebanese Second Division: 1950–51

Racing Beirut

- Lebanese Premier League: 1964–65

Lebanon

- Arab Cup third place: 1963

Individual

- Lebanese Premier League top goalscorer: 1968–69
