= Mardik Tchaparian =

Lebanese footballer

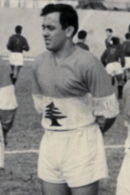
- Mardik with Lebanon at the 1963 Arab Cup

Personal information
- Full name: Mardiros Tchaparian
- Position: Forward

Senior career*
Years	Team	Apps	(Gls)
1950s–1960s	Homenmen		(15+)

International career
1956–1963	Lebanon	11+	(10+)
- * Club domestic league appearances and goals

Mardiros Tchaparian (Arabic: مارديروس تشاباريان), commonly known as Mardik (Arabic: مارديك), is a Lebanese former footballer who played as a striker.

== Club career ==
Active during the 1950s and 1960s, Tchaparian used to play as a striker for Homenmen at club level. He was the top scorer in the 1960–61 Lebanese Premier League, scoring 15 goals during the season. Tchaparian was regarded as one of Homenmen's prominent players of the period.

== International career ==
On 29 February 1956, Tchaparian scored Lebanon's only goal in a 4–1 defeat to Hungary at the Beirut Municipal Stadium, after a sequence of dribbles. He reportedly impressed both the Hungarian coach and forward Ferenc Puskás, who approached him after the match, shook his hand and applauded his performance, telling him that his technique and speed were sufficient to play in Europe. Following the match, the Lebanese press nicknamed Tchaparian "the Lebanese Puskás".

At the 1957 Arab Games, he scored twice in Lebanon's 6–3 victory over Jordan on 22 October. He scored a hat-trick against Kuwait in the 1963 Arab Cup.

== Career statistics ==
=== International ===
Goal	Date	Venue	Opponent	Score	Result	Competition
1	29 February 1956	Beirut Municipal Stadium, Beirut, Lebanon	Hungary	–	1–4	Friendly
2	22 October 1957	Camille Chamoun Stadium, Beirut, Lebanon	Jordan	–	6–0	1957 Pan Arab Games
3	22 October 1957	Camille Chamoun Stadium, Beirut, Lebanon	Jordan	–	6–0	1957 Pan Arab Games
4	26 January 1962	Kuwait University Stadium, Shuwaikh, Kuwait	Kuwait	2–0	5–0	Friendly
5	26 January 1962	Kuwait University Stadium, Shuwaikh, Kuwait	Kuwait	5–0	5–0	Friendly
6	29 January 1962	Kuwait University Stadium, Shuwaikh, Kuwait	Kuwait	–	3–0	Friendly
7	29 January 1962	Kuwait University Stadium, Shuwaikh, Kuwait	Kuwait	–	3–0	Friendly
8	31 March 1963	Camille Chamoun Stadium, Beirut, Lebanon	Kuwait	2–0	6–0	1963 Arab Cup
9	31 March 1963	Camille Chamoun Stadium, Beirut, Lebanon	Kuwait	4–0	6–0	1963 Arab Cup
10	31 March 1963	Camille Chamoun Stadium, Beirut, Lebanon	Kuwait	5–0	6–0	1963 Arab Cup

== Honours ==
Homenmen

- Lebanese Premier League: 1954, 1957, 1961

Lebanon

- Pan Arab Games third place: 1957
- Arab Cup third place: 1963

Individual

- Lebanese Premier League top goalscorer: 1960–61
