= Nasser Al-Johar =

Saudi Arabian footballer (born 1946)

Personal information
- Full name: Nasser Hamad Al-Johar
- Date of birth: 6 January 1946 (age 80)
- Place of birth: Riyadh, Saudi Arabia

Senior career*
| Years | Team | Apps | (Gls) |
| 1963–1977 | Al-Nassr | | |

International career
| 1966–1976 | Saudi Arabia | | |

Managerial career
- 1990–1991: Al-Nassr
- 1993: Al-Nassr
- 2000: Saudi Arabia
- 2001–2002: Saudi Arabia
- 2004: Saudi Arabia
- 2008–2009: Saudi Arabia
- 2011: Saudi Arabia
Medal record
Men's football
Representing Saudi Arabia (as manager)
AFC Asian Cup
| Runner-up | 2000 |
- * Club domestic league appearances and goals

Nasser Hamad Al-Johar (Arabic: ناصر الجوهر; born 6 January 1946) is a Saudi Arabian former football coach and former player.

== Playing career ==
Al-Johar played for Al Nassr FC.

== Managerial career ==
Al-Johar coached the Saudi Arabia national team for both the 2000 AFC Asian Cup (replacing Milan Máčala) and 2002 FIFA World Cup (after replacing Slobodan Santrač), though he was fired after Saudi Arabia lost all 3 matches and failed to score a single goal.

Al-Johar briefly returned to manage the Saudi Arabia national team in September 2004 but left again in November 2004.

When coach Hélio dos Anjos was fired in June 2008, Al-Johar was hired to replace him for the rest of the 2010 FIFA World Cup qualification returning to coach the national team for a third time. Al-Johar resigned from coaching The Green Falcons in February 2009 after the team lost to North Korea in the AFC fourth round of 2010 FIFA World Cup qualification; he was replaced with José Peseiro. The Saudi Arabia Football Federation announced the "reclusive" Al-Johar would continue to support the team as a "technical advisor".

After losing to the Syria national team on 9 January 2011, it was announced that Al-Johar would replace Peseiro for the remainder of the 2011 AFC Asian Cup; after two further losses (1–0 against Jordan and 5–0 against Japan), the perennial fix-it man for Saudi Arabia was again sacked, less than two weeks after taking the helm.
