= Levon Altounian =

Lebanese footballer (1936–2020)

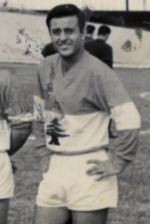
- Altounian with Lebanon at the 1963 Arab Cup

Personal information
- Full name: Levon Aram Altounian
- Date of birth: 15 February 1936
- Place of birth: Beirut, Lebanese Republic
- Date of death: 6 September 2020 (aged 84)
- Place of death: Roumieh, Lebanon
- Height: 1.70 m (5 ft 7 in)
- Positions: Right winger; attacking midfielder

Youth career
- Homenetmen

Senior career*
| Years | Team | Apps | (Gls) |
| 1952–1973 | Homenetmen | | (33+) |

International career
| 1956–1967 | Lebanon | 18+ | (17+) |
- * Club domestic league appearances and goals

Levon Aram Altounian (Arabic: ليون ارام التونيان; 15 February 1936 – 6 September 2020) was a Lebanese footballer who played as a right winger or an attacking midfielder.

Altounian played his whole club career at Homenetmen, between 1952 and 1973, finishing as top scorer of the Lebanese Premier League twice: in 1962–63 and in 1966–67. Altounian also represented the Lebanon national team, captaining them to a third-place finish at the 1963 Arab Cup.

== Club career ==
Born on 15 February 1936 in Beirut, Lebanon, Altounian played his whole club career at Homenetmen, between 1952 and 1973. He was awarded top scorer of the Lebanese Premier League twice, during the 1962–63 and 1966–67 seasons, scoring respectively 14 and 19 goals.

== International career ==
Altounian played for the Lebanon national team, scoring two goals in the 1957 Pan Arab Games and helping Lebanon reach third place. He also participated in the 1963 Arab Cup as Lebanon's captain; he scored six goals, with Lebanon coming in third place in the competition.

== Style of play ==
Altounian started out as an attacking midfielder, before developing as a right winger. He was known for his speed, dribbling, and technical ability, as well as for scoring difficult top-corner goals.

== Personal life ==
Levon's favourite player was Mardik Tchaparian in Lebanon, and Pelé worldwide; his favourite coach was Joseph Nalbandian. His brother, Manuel, also played football, and represented Lebanon internationally.

== Death ==
On 6 September 2020, Altounian died in the Daher El Bachek Hospital in Roumieh, Lebanon.

== Career statistics ==
=== International ===
Scores and results list Lebanon's goal tally first, score column indicates score after each Altounian goal.

List of international goals scored by Levon Altounian
| No. | Date | Venue | Opponent | Score | Result | Competition |
|---|---|---|---|---|---|---|
| 1 | 24 October 1957 | Camille Chamoun Stadium, Beirut, Lebanon | Jordan | – | 6–0 | 1957 Arab Games |
| 2 | 24 October 1957 | Camille Chamoun Stadium, Beirut, Lebanon | Jordan | – | 6–0 | 1957 Arab Games |
| 3 | 26 January 1962 | Kuwait University Stadium, Kuwait City, Kuwait | Kuwait | 3–0 | 5–0 | Friendly |
| 4 | 31 March 1963 | Camille Chamoun Stadium, Beirut, Lebanon | Kuwait | 2–0 | 6–0 | 1963 Arab Cup |
| 5 | 31 March 1963 | Camille Chamoun Stadium, Beirut, Lebanon | Kuwait | 6–0 | 6–0 | 1963 Arab Cup |
| 6 | 4 April 1963 | Camille Chamoun Stadium, Beirut, Lebanon | Syria | 2–3 | 2–3 | 1963 Arab Cup |
| 7 | 6 April 1963 | Camille Chamoun Stadium, Beirut, Lebanon | Jordan | 1–0 | 5–0 | 1963 Arab Cup |
| 8 | 6 April 1963 | Camille Chamoun Stadium, Beirut, Lebanon | Jordan | 4–0 | 5–0 | 1963 Arab Cup |
| 9 | 3 April 1966 | Al-Kashafa Stadium, Baghdad, Iraq | Bahrain | – | 6–1 | 1966 Arab Cup |
| 10 | 3 April 1966 | Al-Kashafa Stadium, Baghdad, Iraq | Bahrain | – | 6–1 | 1966 Arab Cup |
| 11 | 5 June 1966 | Stade Léopold Sédar Senghor, Dakar, Senegal | Senegal | – | 3–2 | Friendly |
| 12 | 3 October 1967 | Tokyo National Stadium, Tokyo, Japan | Japan | 1–0 | 1–3 | 1968 Summer Olympics qualification |
| 13 | 6 October 1967 | Tokyo National Stadium, Tokyo, Japan | Philippines | – | 11–1 | 1968 Summer Olympics qualification |
| 14 | 6 October 1967 | Tokyo National Stadium, Tokyo, Japan | Philippines | – | 11–1 | 1968 Summer Olympics qualification |
| 15 | 6 October 1967 | Tokyo National Stadium, Tokyo, Japan | Philippines | – | 11–1 | 1968 Summer Olympics qualification |
| 16 | 6 October 1967 | Tokyo National Stadium, Tokyo, Japan | Philippines | – | 11–1 | 1968 Summer Olympics qualification |
| 17 | 9 October 1967 | Tokyo National Stadium, Tokyo, Japan | Taiwan | – | 5–2 | 1968 Summer Olympics qualification |

== Honours ==
Homenetmen

- Lebanese Premier League: 1954–55, 1962–63, 1968–69
- Lebanese FA Cup: 1961–62

Lebanon

- Pan Arab Games third place: 1957
- Arab Cup third place: 1963

Individual

- Lebanese Premier League top goalscorer: 1962–63, 1966–67
- Arab Cup top goalscorer: 1963

== See also ==
- List of association football families
