= Football at the 1961 Arab Games =

1961 Arab Games football tournament
Tournament details
- Host country: Morocco
- City: Casablanca
- Dates: 27 August – 8 September 1961
- Teams: 6 (from 2 confederations)
- Venues: 5 (in 1 host city)

Final positions
- Champions: Morocco (1st title)
- Runners-up: United Arab Republic
- Third place: Libya
- Fourth place: Lebanon

Tournament statistics
- Matches played: 15
- Goals scored: 88 (5.87 per match)

The 1961 Arab Games football tournament was the third edition of the Arab Games men's football tournament. The football tournament was held in Casablanca, Morocco between 27 August and 8 September 1961 as part of the 1961 Arab Games.

== Participating teams ==
The following countries participated in the final tournament:

- Kuwait
- Lebanon
- Libya
- Morocco (hosts)
- Saudi Arabia
- United Arab Republic

== Final tournament ==
Team	Pld	W	D	L	GF	GA	GD	Pts
Morocco	5	5	0	0	26	6	+20	15
United Arab Republic	5	4	0	1	29	4	+25	12
Libya	5	2	1	2	13	13	0	10
Lebanon	5	2	0	3	13	9	+4	9
Saudi Arabia	5	1	0	4	4	38	–34	7
Kuwait	5	0	1	4	3	18	–15	6

27 August 1961

Libya	3–2	Lebanon

Stade Mohammed V, Casablanca
7 September 1961 (Note: The match was due to be played on 27 August.)

Kuwait	0–1	Saudi Arabia

Stade Mohammed V, Casablanca
8 September 1961

Morocco	3–2 (Egypt withdrew at 2–2)	United Arab Republic

Stade Mohammed V, Casablanca
Referee: Joseph Nalbandian (Lebanon)

29 August 1961

Libya	5–1	Saudi Arabia

Stade Mohammed V, Casablanca
29 August 1961

United Arab Republic	4–0	Lebanon

Stade Mohammed V, Casablanca
29 August 1961

Morocco	3–1	Kuwait

Rabat

31 August 1961

United Arab Republic	2–1	Libya

Fez
31 August 1961

Lebanon	4–0	Kuwait

Tétouan
31 August 1961

Morocco	13–1	Saudi Arabia

Stade Mohammed V, Casablanca

3 September 1961

United Arab Republic	13–0	Saudi Arabia

Rabat
3 September 1961

Morocco	1–0	Lebanon

Stade Mohammed V, Casablanca
3 September 1961

Kuwait	2–2	Libya

Stade Mohammed V, Casablanca

5 September 1961

Morocco	6–2	Libya

Oujda
5 September 1961

Lebanon	7–1	Saudi Arabia

Stade Mohammed V, Casablanca
5 September 1961

United Arab Republic	8–0	Kuwait

Stade Mohammed V, Casablanca
