= 1963 Arab Cup =

First Arab Cup, held in Lebanon

Tournament details
- Host country: Lebanon
- Dates: 31 March – 7 April
- Teams: 5 (from 2 confederations)
- Venue: 1 (in 1 host city)

Final positions
- Champions: Tunisia (1st title)
- Runners-up: Syria
- Third place: Lebanon
- Fourth place: Kuwait

Tournament statistics
- Matches played: 10
- Goals scored: 40 (4 per match)
- Top scorer(s): (Lebanon) Levon Altounian (6 goals)

The 1963 Arab Cup was the first edition of the Arab Cup hosted in Beirut, Lebanon. Tunisia won the first title of the Arab Cup.

== Participating teams ==
Five teams took part in the tournament: the hosts Lebanon along with Jordan, Kuwait, Syria and Tunisia. Five other teams were invited but did not participate in the tournament: Morocco who initially agreed to take part but later withdrew, Libya who apologized for not participating as they were not yet a FIFA member, United Arab Republic and Sudan who declined the invitation, and Iraq who refused to participate due to Kuwait's presence in the tournament as the Iraqi government did not recognize Kuwait's independence at the time and claimed it as part of its territory.

The 5 participating teams were:

Team	Qualified as
Lebanon	Hosts
Jordan	Invitee
Kuwait	Invitee
Syria	Invitee
Tunisia	Invitee

== Venues ==
Beirut	1963 Arab Cup is located in Lebanon
Camille Chamoun Stadium	1963 Arab Cup is located in Lebanon
Capacity: 45,000	1963 Arab Cup is located in Lebanon

== Final tournament ==
=== Tournament classification ===
Pos	Team	Pld	W	D	L	GF	GA	GD	Pts	Qualification
1	Tunisia	4	4	0	0	11	1	+10	8	Champions
2	Syria	4	3	0	1	11	3	+8	6	
3	Lebanon	4	2	0	2	13	4	+9	4	
4	Kuwait	4	1	0	3	5	15	−10	2	
5	Jordan	4	0	0	4	0	17	−17	0	

Source: RSSSF

=== Matches ===
31 March 1963

Syria	4–0	Jordan
Kavlakian 22', 70'; Haroutioun 65'; Hajjar 68'

Camille Chamoun Stadium, Beirut
Attendance: 20,000
Referee: Atef Sinane (Lebanon)
31 March 1963

Lebanon	6–0	Kuwait
Altounian 20', 40', 84'; Tchaparian 25', 69'; Chéhadé 35'

Camille Chamoun Stadium, Beirut
Attendance: 20,000
Referee: Muvahhit Afir (Turkey)

2 April 1963

Kuwait	4–0	Jordan
Al-Masoud 42', 76' (pen.); Al-Dawla 49', 87'

Camille Chamoun Stadium, Beirut
Attendance: 7,000
Referee: Sarkis Demirdjian (Lebanon)
2 April 1963

Tunisia	1–0	Syria
Ben Amor 20'

Camille Chamoun Stadium, Beirut
Attendance: 7,000
Referee: Muvahhit Afir (Turkey)

4 April 1963

Lebanon	2–3	Syria
Abou Murad 9'; Altounian 79'		Mughrabi 16'; Kavlakian 58'; Shammas 60'

Camille Chamoun Stadium, Beirut
Attendance: 10,000
Referee: Muvahhit Afir (Turkey)
4 April 1963

Tunisia	4–0	Jordan
Haddad 1', 6'; Jedidi 26'; Henia 34'

Camille Chamoun Stadium, Beirut
Attendance: 10,000
Referee: Atef Sinane (Lebanon)

6 April 1963

Tunisia	5–1	Kuwait
Habacha 9'; Jedidi 21', 54'; Henia 73'; Haddad 78'		Al-Dawla 85'

Camille Chamoun Stadium, Beirut
Attendance: 5,000
Referee: Khatchadour Boyadjian (Lebanon)
6 April 1963

Lebanon	5–0	Jordan
Abou Murad 6'; Saad 32'; Altounian 40', 47' (pen.); Chéhadé 60'

Camille Chamoun Stadium, Beirut
Attendance: 5,000
Referee: Muvahhit Afir (Turkey)

7 April 1963

Syria	4–0	Kuwait
Betraki 30' (pen.); Haroutioun 64'; Chayeb 74'; Kavlakian 84'

Camille Chamoun Stadium, Beirut
Attendance: 20,000
Referee: Atef Sinane (Lebanon)

==== Lebanon v Tunisia match ====
The game was the decisive match of group stage at the 1963 Arab Cup. The match was played at Camille Chamoun Stadium in Beirut on 7 April 1963. The winner was determined by a final group stage, with the final five teams playing in round-robin format, instead of a knockout stage. Tunisia won the tournament finishing first in the final standing.

Match details

7 April 1963

Lebanon	0−1	Tunisia
	Report	Itani 10' (o.g.)

Camille Chamoun Stadium, Beirut
Attendance: 20,000
Referee: Muvahhit Afir (Turkey)

Lebanon	Tunisia

Lebanon:
GK	1	Samih Chatila
DF	5	Youssef Yammouth	Sent off (straight red)
DF	12	Samik Sabkadjian
DF	2	Muhieddine "Tabello" Itani		(substituted off) 15'
DF	13	Elias "Kharma" Georges
MF	6	Ahmad Alameh
MF	7	Robert "Roro" Chehadeh
MF	10	Mardik Tchaparian
FW	16	Levon Altounian (c)
FW	4	Joseph Abou Murad
FW	15	Mahmoud "Abou Taleb" Berjaoui
Substitutes:
DF	19	Camille Haidar		(substituted on) 15'
Manager:
Joseph Nalbandian

Tunisia:
GK	1	Abdelkader "Zerga" Ghalem
DF	2	Mohsen Keffala
DF	6	Mohsen Habacha
DF	4	Ahmed Sghaïer
DF	16	Mahfoudh Benzarti		Substituted off
MF	9	Taoufik Ben Othman
MF	12	Mongi Haddad	Sent off (straight red)
MF	10	Abdelmajid Chetali (c)
FW	17	Alaya Sassi
FW	8	Mohamed Salah Jedidi
FW	11	Hammadi Henia
Substitutes:
DF	3	Hédi Douiri		Substituted on
Manager:
(France) André Gérard

1963 Arab Cup winners

Tunisia
First title

== Goalscorers ==
There were 40 goals scored in 10 matches, for an average of 4 goals per match.

6 goals

- (Lebanon) Levon Altounian

4 goals

- (Syria) Avedis Kavlakian

3 goals

- (Kuwait) Abdulrahman Al-Dawla
- (Tunisia) Mongi Haddad
- (Tunisia) Mohamed Salah Jedidi

2 goals

- (Kuwait) Mohammed Al-Masoud
- (Lebanon) Joseph Abou Murad
- (Lebanon) Robert Chéhadé
- (Lebanon) Mardik Tchaparian
- (Syria) Hagop Haroutioun
- (Tunisia) Hammadi Henia

1 goal

- (Lebanon) Michel Saad
- (Syria) Honein Betraki
- (Syria) Philippe Chayeb
- (Syria) Yéhyé Hajjar
- (Syria) Ibrahim Mughrabi
- (Syria) Moussa Shammas
- (Tunisia) Raouf Ben Amor
- (Tunisia) Mohsen Habacha

1 own goal

- (Lebanon) Muhieddine Itani (against Tunisia)
