= Larbi Touati =

Tunisian footballer

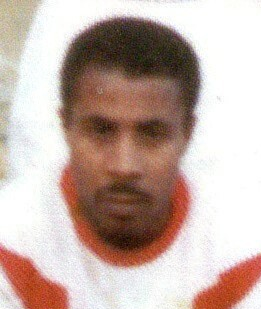
- Larbi Touati with Club Africain in 1963

Personal information
- Date of birth: 12 October 1936 (age 90)
- Place of birth: Tunis, Tunisia
- Position: Forward

International career
Years	Team	Apps	(Gls)
- Tunisia

Larbi Touati (born 12 October 1936) is a Tunisian former footballer. He competed in the men's tournament at the 1960 Summer Olympics.
