= Football at the Arab Games =

- Organiser(s): UAFA
- Founded: 1953; 73 years ago
- Region: Arab world
- Teams: 12 (from 2 confederations)
- Current champions: Saudi Arabia (1st title)
- Most championships: Egypt (4 titles)
- Football at the 2023 Arab Games

The Arab Games are a regional multi-sport event held between nations from the Arab world. A men's football tournament has been held at every session of the Games since 1953, except for 2004. Since the 2023 edition, the tournament has been limited to under-23 teams, plus up to three overage players for each squad.

== Summaries ==
The following table gives an overview of medal winners in football at the Arab Games. 1992 Arab Games which overlaps the 1992 Arab Cup.

Ed.	Year	Host	Gold medal game			Bronze medal game		
Ed.	Year	Host	Gold	Score	Silver	Bronze	Score	Fourth
1	1953	Alexandria	Egypt	4–0	Syria	Libya	3–2	Jordan
2	1957	Beirut	Syria	3–1	Tunisia	Lebanon	^{w/o}	Morocco
3	1961	Casablanca	Morocco	^{n/a}	UA Republic	Libya	^{n/a}	Lebanon
4	1965	Cairo	UA Republic	0–0	Sudan	Libya	4–2	Palestine
5	1976	Damascus	Morocco	^{n/a}	Saudi Arabia	Syria	^{n/a}	South Yemen
6	1985	Rabat	Iraq	1–0	Morocco	Algeria	^{w/o}	Saudi Arabia
7	1992	Damascus	Egypt	3–2	Saudi Arabia	Kuwait	2–1	Syria
8	1997	Beirut	Jordan	1–0	Syria	Lebanon	3–1	Kuwait
9	1999	Amman	Jordan	4–4 (a.e.t.) (3–1 p)	Iraq	Libya / Palestine; No 3rd Place Match		
10	2007	Cairo	Egypt	^{n/a}	Libya	Saudi Arabia	^{n/a}	United Arab Emirates
11	2011	Doha	Bahrain	1–0	Jordan	Kuwait	3–0 (a.e.t.)	Palestine
12	2023	Algeria^{n/b}	Saudi Arabia	1–1 (5–4 p)	Syria	Sudan	2–2 (4–2 p)	Algeria
13	2027	Riyadh	Future event					

* The 1992 edition organised as part of the Arab Games, and also counted as Arab Cup.
^n/a A round-robin tournament determined the final standings.
^n/b Arab Games held in 5 cities (Algiers, Oran, Constantine, Annaba and Tipaza). Football tournament held in Annaba and Constantine.
^w/o withdrew

== Medal table ==
Rank	Nation	Gold	Silver	Bronze	Total
1	Egypt	4	1	0	5
2	Jordan	2	1	0	3
2	Morocco	2	1	0	3
4	Syria	1	3	1	5
5	Saudi Arabia	1	2	1	4
6	Iraq	1	1	0	2
7	Bahrain	1	0	0	1
8	Libya	0	1	4	5
9	Sudan	0	1	1	2
10	Tunisia	0	1	0	1
11	Kuwait	0	0	2	2
11	Lebanon	0	0	2	2
13	Algeria	0	0	1	1
13	Palestine	0	0	1	1
Totals (14 entries)		12	12	13	37

- The 1992 edition organised as part of the Arab Games, is also counted as the sixth edition of the Arab Cup.

== Overall team records ==
In this ranking 3 points are awarded for a win, 1 for a draw and 0 for a loss. As per statistical convention in football, matches decided in extra time are counted as wins and losses, while matches decided by penalty shoot-outs are counted as draws. Teams are ranked by total points, then by goal difference, then by goals scored.

As of Football at the 2023 Arab Games

Excluding the 1992 Arab Games which overlaps the 1992 Arab Cup.

Rank	Teams	Part	M	W	D	L	GF	GA	GD	Points
1	Libya	9	35	15	8	12	97	73	+24	53
2	Syria	8	34	14	11	9	61	41	+20	53
3	Jordan	6	29	15	5	9	51	42	+9	50
4	Egypt	4	18	16	1	1	91	10	+81	49
5	Morocco	4	20	14	5	1	59	15	+44	47
6	Saudi Arabia	8	31	11	8	12	38	63	-25	41
7	Iraq	5	20	10	5	5	39	23	+16	35
8	Lebanon	7	28	8	7	13	43	51	-8	31
9	Palestine	6	28	7	7	14	27	54	-27	28
10	Sudan	4	18	8	2	8	41	25	+16	26
11	Tunisia	2	8	5	1	2	21	15	+6	16
12	Kuwait	3	14	5	1	8	18	29	-11	16
13	United Arab Emirates	4	15	4	3	8	13	19	-6	15
14	Algeria	2	10	4	2	4	11	10	+1	14
15	Bahrain	2	6	3	1	2	9	9	0	10
16	Oman	5	16	1	6	9	9	61	-53	9
17	South Yemen	1	6	3	1	2	7	8	-1	7
18	Somalia	1	3	1	0	2	5	6	-1	3
19	North Yemen	1	3	1	0	2	3	6	-3	3
20	(Sultanate of Lahej) Lahej	1	4	1	0	3	2	30	-28	3
21	Qatar	2	4	0	2	2	2	6	-4	2
22	Mauritania	4	15	0	2	13	10	37	-27	2
23	(Aden Colony) Aden	1	4	0	0	4	3	25	-23	0

- Yemen: (Sultanate of Lahej) Lahej and (Aden Colony) Aden (1963–1967) & South Yemen and North Yemen (1967–1990).
- Former Countries.

== Comprehensive team results by tournament ==
Legends

- 1st – Champions
- 2nd – Runners-up
- 3rd – Third place
- 4th – Fourth place
- GS – Group stage
- q – Qualified
- – Hosts

Teams	(Egypt) 1953	(Lebanon) 1957	(Morocco) 1961	(United Arab Republic) 1965	(Syria) 1976	(Morocco) 1985	(Syria) 1992	(Lebanon) 1997	(Jordan) 1999	(Egypt) 2007	(Qatar) 2011	(Algeria) 2023	(Saudi Arabia) 2027	Years
Algeria	—N/a	—N/a	—N/a	—N/a	—N/a	3rd	—N/a	—N/a	—N/a	—N/a	—N/a	4th		2
Bahrain	—N/a	—N/a	—N/a	—N/a	—N/a	—N/a	—N/a	—N/a	GS	—N/a	1st	—N/a		2
Egypt	1st	—N/a	2nd	1st	—N/a	—N/a	1st	—N/a	—N/a	1st	—N/a	—N/a		5
Iraq	—N/a	GS	—N/a	GS	—N/a	1st	—N/a	—N/a	2nd	—N/a	GS	—N/a		5
Jordan	4th	GS	—N/a	—N/a	GS	—N/a	GS	1st	1st	—N/a	2nd	—N/a		7
Kuwait	—N/a	—N/a	GS	—N/a	—N/a	—N/a	3rd	4th	—N/a	—N/a	3rd	—N/a		4
Lebanon	GS	3rd	4th	GS	—N/a	—N/a	—N/a	3rd	GS	—N/a	—N/a	GS		7
Libya	3rd	GS	3rd	3rd	—N/a	GS	—N/a	GS	3rd	2nd	GS	—N/a		9
Mauritania	—N/a	—N/a	—N/a	—N/a	GS	GS	—N/a	GS	—N/a	—N/a	—N/a	GS		4
Morocco	—N/a	4th	1st	—N/a	1st	2nd	—N/a	—N/a	—N/a	—N/a	—N/a	—N/a		4
Oman	—N/a	—N/a	—N/a	GS	—N/a	—N/a	—N/a	GS	GS	—N/a	GS	GS		5
Palestine	GS	—N/a	—N/a	4th	GS	—N/a	GS	—N/a	3rd	—N/a	4th	GS		7
Qatar	—N/a	—N/a	—N/a	—N/a	—N/a	—N/a	—N/a	—N/a	GS		GS	—N/a		2
Saudi Arabia	—N/a	GS	GS	—N/a	2nd	4th	2nd	—N/a	GS	3rd	GS	1st	Q	10
Somalia	—N/a	—N/a	—N/a	—N/a	—N/a	GS	—N/a	—N/a	—N/a	—N/a	—N/a	—N/a		1
Sudan	—N/a	—N/a	—N/a	2nd	—N/a	—N/a	—N/a	—N/a	—N/a	GS	GS	3rd		4
Syria	2nd	1st	—N/a	GS	3rd	GS	4th	2nd	GS	—N/a	—N/a	2nd		9
Tunisia	—N/a	2nd	—N/a	—N/a	—N/a	GS	—N/a	—N/a	—N/a	—N/a	—N/a	—N/a		2
United Arab Emirates	—N/a	—N/a	—N/a	—N/a	—N/a	GS		GS	GS	4th	—N/a	—N/a		4
Yemen	—N/a	—N/a	—N/a	GS	4th	GS	—N/a	—N/a	—N/a	—N/a	—N/a	—N/a		3
Total	6	8	6	9	7	11	6	8	11	5	10	8		

Notes
1965 Yemen consist of : (Aden Colony) Aden & (Sultanate of Lahej) Lahej
1976 Yemen consist of : South Yemen
1985 Yemen consist of : North Yemen

== See also ==
- FIFA Arab Cup
