= Camille Chamoun Sports City Stadium =

Multi-purpose stadium in Beirut, Lebanon

- ملعب مدينة كميل شمعون الرياضية
- CCSC; Sports City Stadium
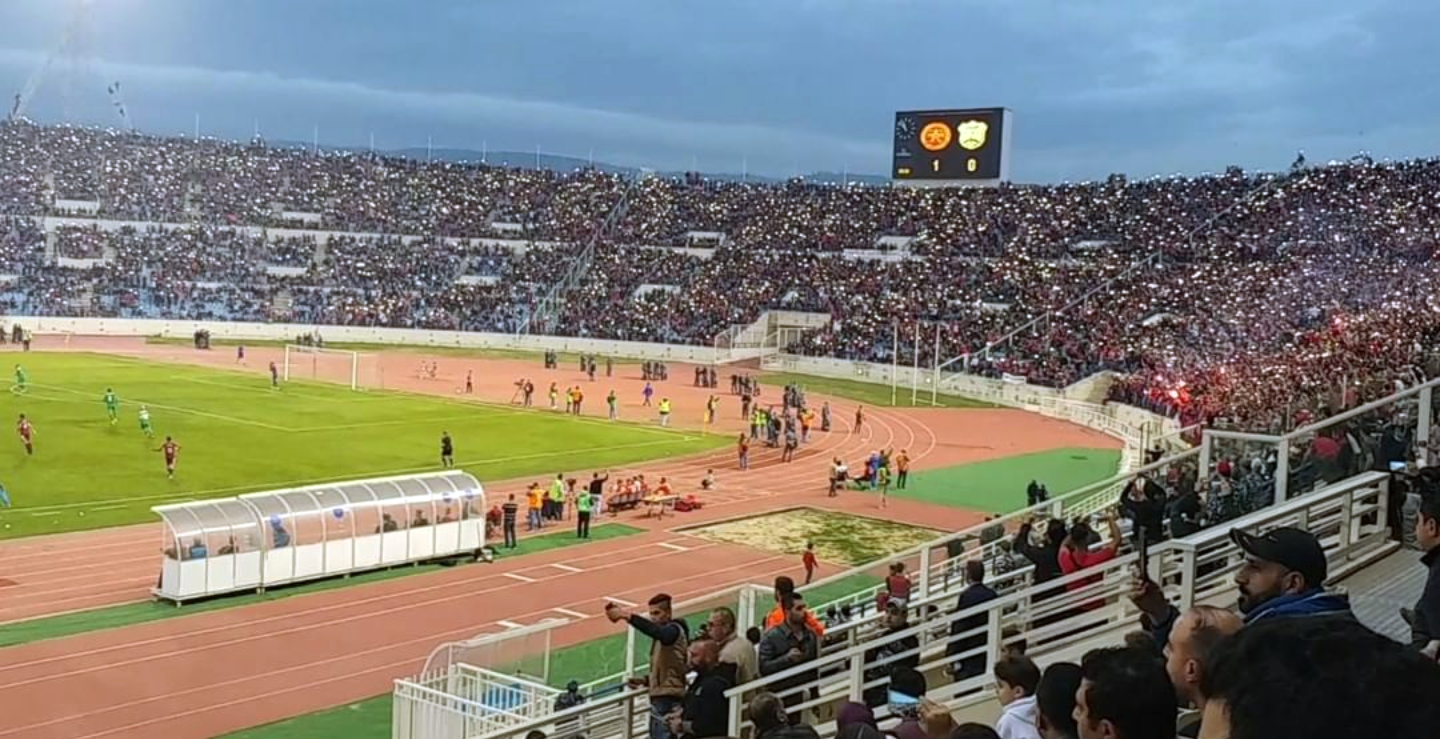
- The Camille Chamoun Sports City Stadium during the Beirut derby in 2018
- Interactive map of Camille Chamoun Sports City Stadium
- Address: Ziad Rahbani Avenue, Bir Hassan
- Location: Beirut, Lebanon
- Coordinates: 33°52′02″N 35°29′46″E
- Owner: Government of Lebanon
- Operator: Government of Lebanon
- Capacity: 49,500
- Surface: Grass
- Field size: 102 m × 70 m (112 yd × 77 yd)

Construction
- Groundbreaking: 1955
- Opened: 1957
- Demolished: 1982
- Rebuilt: 1997
- Cost: US$100 million (1997 reconstruction)
- Architects: Laceco Architects & Engineers (1997 reconstruction)
- Builder: Trafalgar House (1997 reconstruction)

Tenant
- Lebanon national football team (1957–1982, 1997–present)

Camille Chamoun Sports City Stadium (CCSC; Arabic: ملعب مدينة كميل شمعون الرياضية) is a multi-purpose stadium in the Bir Hassan neighbourhood of Beirut, Lebanon. With a capacity of 49,500 seats, it is the largest stadium in Lebanon and is primarily used for football matches and athletics events.

Originally inaugurated in 1957 during the presidency of Camille Chamoun, the stadium hosted several major regional competitions before being destroyed during the 1982 Lebanon War. It was rebuilt in 1997 and went on to host the 1997 Pan Arab Games, the 2000 AFC Asian Cup, and the 2009 Jeux de la Francophonie. Following severe damage in the 2020 Beirut explosion and subsequent periods of disrepair and non-sporting use—including as a grain depot, funeral venue, and displacement shelter—the stadium underwent rehabilitation and reopened for domestic football in November 2026.

== History ==
=== 1957–1982: Construction, early events, and destruction ===
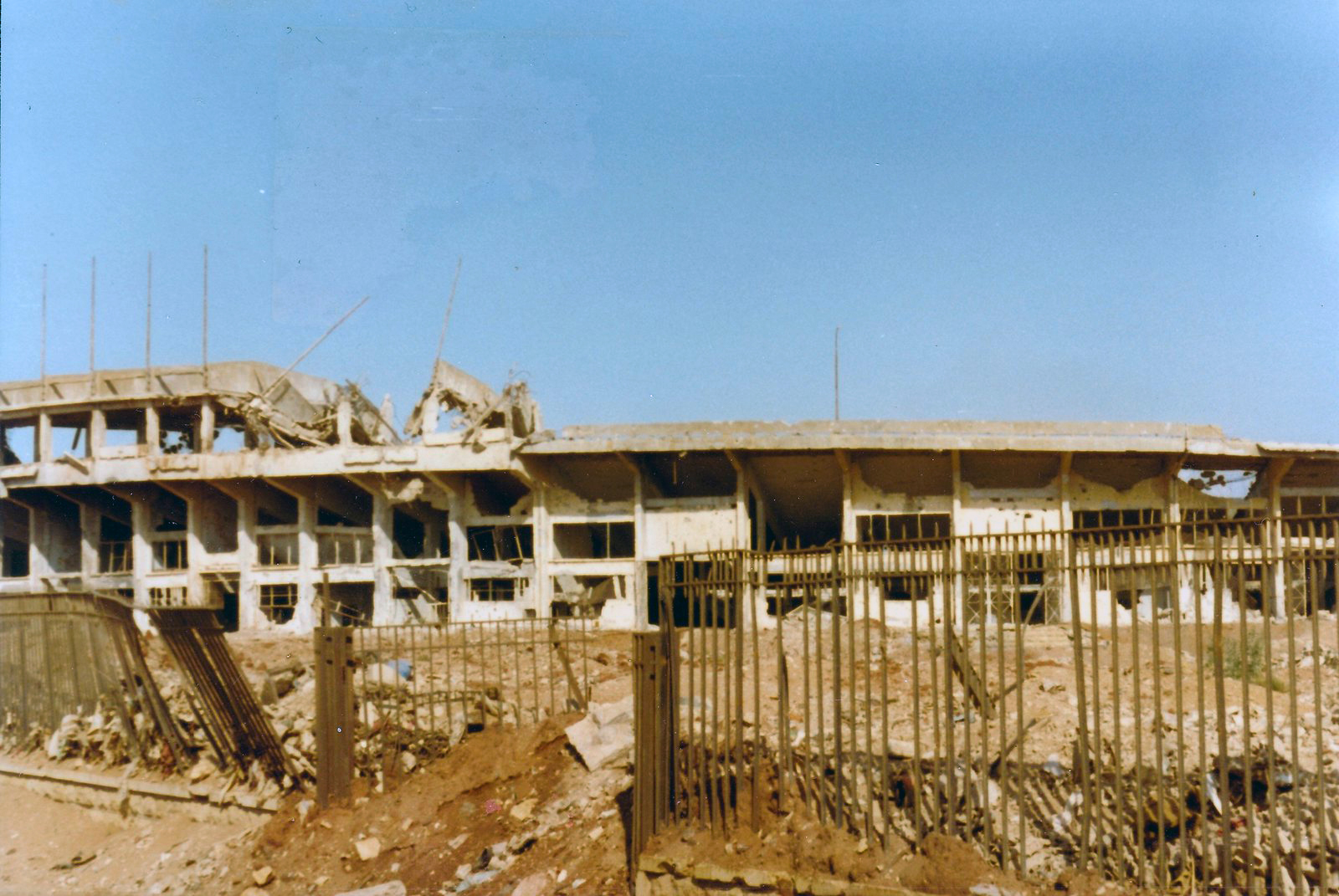
The stadium in ruins in 1982 after being bombed during the 1982 Lebanon War.

Construction began in 1955 under the Lebanese Ministry of Youth and Fine Arts during the presidency of Camille Chamoun, and the stadium was inaugurated in 1957. Its opening match was a friendly in which the Lebanon national football team defeated Romanian club Energia Ploiești 1–0, with Joseph Abou Murad scoring the winning goal.

During its first two decades, the stadium served as Lebanon's premier sporting venue. It hosted the 1957 Pan Arab Games, the 1959 Mediterranean Games—the first edition of the games held in Asia—and the inaugural 1963 Arab Cup. In April 1975, one week before the outbreak of the Lebanese Civil War, Brazilian footballer Pelé appeared at the stadium in a friendly match playing for Nejmeh SC.

During the 1982 Lebanon War, the stadium was completely destroyed by Israeli bombardment.

=== 1997–2019: Reconstruction and major tournaments ===
In the 1990s, Prime Minister Rafic Hariri initiated a US$100 million project to reconstruct the stadium ahead of the 2000 AFC Asian Cup. The rebuilt venue was designed by Laceco Architects & Engineers and constructed by the British engineering firm Trafalgar House.

Following its completion in 1997, the stadium reopened in July to host the 1997 Pan Arab Games. It subsequently served as the main venue for the 1999 Arab Athletics Championships, the 2000 AFC Asian Cup—including the opening match and the final—and the sixth 2009 Jeux de la Francophonie, held from 27 September to 3 October 2009. On 27 April 2017, the stadium hosted an exhibition match between Barcelona Legends and Real Madrid Legends, which ended in a 3–2 victory for Barcelona.

=== 2020–present: Damage, non-sporting uses, and reopenings ===
In 2026, the stadium was used as a shelter for families displaced from the 2026 Lebanon war

The stadium sustained severe structural damage in the 2020 Beirut explosion, rendering it unavailable for the 2020–21 football season. In October 2020, it was temporarily repurposed to store flour and wheat after the explosion destroyed Beirut's port grain silos.

On 23 February 2025, the stadium served as the venue for the funeral of Hassan Nasrallah, the largest funeral held in Lebanon in two decades.

On 23 May 2025, after five years without hosting competitive football, the stadium partially reopened for a Beirut derby between Nejmeh and Ansar, with Lebanese Prime Minister Nawaf Salam in attendance. However, the venue fell back into neglect within months.

In March 2026, the stadium was opened as an emergency shelter for families displaced by Israeli airstrikes, with the Lebanese Red Cross establishing tent camps and humanitarian services on site. Later in 2026, Nejmeh SC led a rehabilitation and management initiative to upgrade the pitch, dressing rooms, and spectator facilities with the aim of adopting the venue as its home ground. Following these works, the stadium reopened on 21 November 2026 to host a Lebanese Premier League match between Nejmeh and Mabarra.

== Structure ==
The stadium covers an area of approximately 50,000 m^{2} (540,000 sq ft). Its seating bowl accommodates between 48,837 and 49,500 spectators depending on configuration, including 17,799 covered seats, 1,252 VIP seats, and a 37-seat presidential suite.

Beneath the stands, the complex houses administrative offices, headquarters for the Lebanese Olympic Committee and national sports federations, press facilities, and emergency medical clinics with dedicated parking for ambulances and fire engines.

== See also ==
- Category:Events at Camille Chamoun Sports City Stadium
- List of football stadiums in Lebanon

== Bibliography ==
- Inglis, Simon (2000). Sightlines: A Stadium Odyssey. Yellow Jersey. ISBN 0-224-05968-8.

Events and tenants
Preceded by Sheikh Zayed Stadium; Abu Dhabi	AFC Asian Cup; Final venue 2000	Succeeded by Workers' Stadium; Beijing
