= Kuwait University Stadium =

Football stadium in Kuwait

Kuwait University Stadium PAEET
- Full name: Kuwait University Stadium
- Former names: Shuwaikh High School Stadium
- Location: Shuwaikh Educational, Capital
- Capacity: 16,000
- Surface: Grass

Construction
- Opened: 1953

Kuwait University Stadium is a multi-purpose stadium in Shuwaikh Educational, Capital, Kuwait City. It is currently used mostly for football matches for several local clubs. The stadium holds 16,000 people.

== History ==
The stadium was opened on 1953 under the name of Shuwaikh High School Stadium. It's holds on past many importants events such as 1964 Arab Nations Cup.

== See also ==
- List of football stadiums in Kuwait
