= 1985 Arab Cup squads =

Below is a list of squads used in the 1985 Arab Cup.

== Group A ==
=== Jordan ===
Coach: Mohammad Awad

No.	Pos.	Player	Date of birth (age)	Caps	Goals	Club
	GK	Basem Tim	16 February 1958 (aged 27)			(Jordan Football Association) Al-Wehdat
	GK	Ezzat Hashem	16 February 1958 (aged 27)			(Jordan Football Association) Al-Ahli Amman
	DF	Mohammed Al-Yamani	1 January 1957 (aged 28)			(Jordan Football Association) Al-Faisaly
	DF	Rateb Al-Faleh	14 April 1960 (aged 25)			(Jordan Football Association) Al-Ramtha
	DF	Zaid Al-Sharaa				(Jordan Football Association) Al-Ramtha
	DF	Esam Al-Telli	14 July 1962 (aged 22)			(Jordan Football Association) Al-Jazeera
	DF	Husam Sonokrot	12 June 1960 (aged 25)			(Jordan Football Association) Al-Faisaly
	DF	Waleed Qandil	31 December 1959 (aged 25)			(Jordan Football Association) Al-Wehdat
	MF	Jamal Abu-Abed	19 January 1965 (aged 20)			(Jordan Football Association) Al-Faisaly
	MF	Fayez Al-Bedawi	5 August 1962 (aged 22)			(Jordan Football Association) Al-Ramtha
	MF	Mohammad Al-Dawud	14 April 1960 (aged 25)			(Jordan Football Association) Al-Ramtha
	MF	Tawfiq Al-Saheb	1 January 1961 (aged 24)			(Jordan Football Association) Al-Jazeera
	MF	Jamal Ibrahim				(Jordan Football Association) Al-Nasr
	MF	Basem Morad (c)	11 November 1957 (aged 27)			(Jordan Football Association) Al-Faisaly
	FW	Khaled Awad	4 October 1960 (aged 24)			(Jordan Football Association) Al-Faisaly
	FW	Sami Al-Saeed				(Jordan Football Association) Al-Ramtha
	FW	Adnan Al-Turk				(Jordan Football Association) Al-Ahli Amman
	FW	Ibrahim Saadia	10 February 1959 (aged 26)			(Jordan Football Association) Amman SC
		Ahed Al-Aawar				(Jordan Football Association)
		Haitham Mahmoud				(Jordan Football Association)
		Khalid Mohammed Saeed				(Jordan Football Association)

=== Qatar ===
Coach: (Brazil) Dino Sani

No.	Pos.	Player	Date of birth (age)	Caps	Goals	Club
1	GK	Sami Mohamed Wafa				(Qatar Football Association) Al Sadd
	GK	Ahmad Al-Majed	18 June 1962 (aged 23)			(Qatar Football Association) Al-Arabi
	DF	Abdullah Mubarak	5 August 1962 (aged 22)			(Qatar Football Association) Al Ahli
	DF	Ibrahim Al-Rumahi				(Qatar Football Association) Al Ahli
	DF	Mohammed Mubarak				(Qatar Football Association)
4	DF	Yousef Mubarak Al-Adsani	12 October 1965 (aged 19)			(Qatar Football Association) Al Sadd
7	DF	Adel Khamis	11 November 1965 (aged 19)			(Qatar Football Association) Al-Ittihad
	DF	Mubarak Anber	1 January 1954 (aged 31)			(Qatar Football Association) Al Sadd
	DF	Adel Malallah	15 September 1961 (aged 23)			(Qatar Football Association) Al Ahli
8	MF	Mohammed Al Ammari	10 December 1965 (aged 19)			(Qatar Football Association) Al Sadd
	MF	Ibrahim Khalfan	25 November 1961 (aged 23)			(Qatar Football Association) Al-Arabi
	MF	Mubarak Al-Khater	8 January 1966 (aged 19)			(Qatar Football Association) Al-Wakrah
	MF	Khalid Mustafa				(Qatar Football Association)
	FW	Ali Zaid	21 April 1962 (aged 23)			(Qatar Football Association) Al-Arabi
	FW	Mansoor Muftah	1 January 1955 (aged 30)			(Qatar Football Association) Al-Rayyan
	FW	Man'a Al-Barshi				(Qatar Football Association)
	FW	Salah Eid	8 October 1965 (aged 19)			(Qatar Football Association) Al-Shamal
16	FW	Hassan Sabela				(Qatar Football Association) Al Ahli
		Bilal Faraj				(Qatar Football Association)
		Abdulrahman Mohammed				(Qatar Football Association)
		Salam Mubarak				(Qatar Football Association)
		Taleb Saeed				(Qatar Football Association)

=== Saudi Arabia ===
Coach: Khalil Al-Zayani

No.	Pos.	Player	Date of birth (age)	Caps	Goals	Club
1	GK	Abdullah Al-Deayea	1 December 1961 (aged 23)			(Saudi Arabian Football Federation) Al-Tai
	GK	Khaled Al-Dayel	21 January 1968 (aged 17)			(Saudi Arabian Football Federation) Al-Hilal
	GK	Sameer Slimani				(Saudi Arabian Football Federation) Al-Ahli
2	DF	Nasser Al-Mansoor				(Saudi Arabian Football Federation) Al-Nahda
5	DF	Saleh Nu'eimeh	1 January 1959 (aged 26)			(Saudi Arabian Football Federation) Al-Hilal
13	DF	Mohamed Abd Al-Jawad	28 November 1962 (aged 22)			(Saudi Arabian Football Federation) Al-Ahli
	DF	Hussein Al-Bishi	13 September 1966 (aged 18)			(Saudi Arabian Football Federation) Al-Hilal
	DF	Nawaf Khamees				(Saudi Arabian Football Federation) Al-Shabab
	DF	Bandar Sroor				(Saudi Arabian Football Federation) Al-Ahli
	DF	Sameer Abdulshaker	12 May 1960 (aged 25)			(Saudi Arabian Football Federation) Ohod Club
6	MF	Yousef Khamees	16 August 1961 (aged 23)			(Saudi Arabian Football Federation) Al-Nassr
8	MF	Fahad Al-Bishi	9 October 1965 (aged 19)			(Saudi Arabian Football Federation) Al-Nassr
10	MF	Fahad Al-Musaibeah	4 April 1961 (aged 24)			(Saudi Arabian Football Federation) Al-Hilal
	MF	Ahmad Al-Bishi	10 September 1965 (aged 19)			(Saudi Arabian Football Federation) Al-Qadsiah
	MF	Abdullah Al-Reshood				(Saudi Arabian Football Federation) Al-Ahli
7	FW	Omar Bakhashwain	7 August 1962 (aged 22)			(Saudi Arabian Football Federation) Al-Ettifaq
11	FW	Mohaisen Al-Jam'an	6 April 1966 (aged 19)			(Saudi Arabian Football Federation) Al-Nassr
14	FW	Jamal Mohammed				(Saudi Arabian Football Federation) Al-Ettifaq
	FW	Talal Sobhi				(Saudi Arabian Football Federation) Al-Ahli
	FW	Hathal Al-Dossari				(Saudi Arabian Football Federation) Al-Hilal
	FW	Ismael Hakmi				(Saudi Arabian Football Federation) Al-Ittihad
	FW	Hussam Abu Dawood	1965			(Saudi Arabian Football Federation) Al-Ahli

== Group B ==
=== Bahrain ===
Coach: (England) Keith Burkinshaw

No.	Pos.	Player	Date of birth (age)	Caps	Goals	Club
2	DF	Ebrahim Zaid	(aged 17)			(Bahrain Football Association) Al-Muharraq
3	DF	Salman Al-Harbi	(aged 21)			(Bahrain Football Association) Al-Hala
4	FW	Yacoub Hassan				(Bahrain Football Association)
5	DF	Adnan Daif (c)	(aged 21)			(Bahrain Football Association) Al-Muharraq
7	FW	Ahmed Rashdan				(Bahrain Football Association)
8	MF	Ebrahim Farhan				(Bahrain Football Association) Isa Town Club
10	MF	Ebrahim Al-Harban				(Bahrain Football Association)
11	FW	Hamad Mohammed	(aged 29)			(Bahrain Football Association)
12	MF	Marjan Eid				(Bahrain Football Association) West Riffa SC
14	MF	Ali Hassan Yousif				(Bahrain Football Association)
18	DF	Abdul Karim Saif	(aged 23)			(Bahrain Football Association) West Riffa SC
19	FW	Waleed Shwetar	16 February 1964 (aged 21)			(Bahrain Football Association)
22	GK	Mohammed Saleh Ali Bubshait	1 July 1965 (aged 20)			(Bahrain Football Association) Bahrain SC
	MF	Ali Mohammad Al-Ansari				(Bahrain Football Association)
	MF	Adel Salem				(Bahrain Football Association)
	DF	Khamis Eid	20 October 1966 (aged 18)			(Bahrain Football Association) West Riffa SC
		Bader Al-Fadala				(Bahrain Football Association)
		Mohammed Bilal				(Bahrain Football Association)

=== Iraq B ===
Coach: Anwar Jassam

No.	Pos.	Player	Date of birth (age)	Caps	Goals	Club
21	GK	Suhail Saber	1 June 1962 (aged 23)			(Iraq Football Association) Al-Talaba
	GK	Ahmad Jassim	4 May 1960 (aged 25)			(Iraq Football Association) Al-Rasheed
2	DF	Hameed Rashid	8 January 1963 (aged 22)			(Iraq Football Association) Al-Jaish
3	DF	Ghanim Oraibi	16 August 1961 (aged 23)			(Iraq Football Association) Al-Shabab
4	DF	Hassan Kamal	1 July 1964 (aged 21)			(Iraq Football Association) Al-Jaish
5	DF	Khaled Hadi	1 February 1962 (aged 23)			(Iraq Football Association)
9	MF	Shaker Mahmoud (c)	5 May 1963 (aged 22)			(Iraq Football Association) Al-Rasheed
10	MF	Karim Hadi	1 February 1963 (aged 22)			(Iraq Football Association) Al-Shabab
13	MF	Basim Qasim	22 March 1959 (aged 26)			(Iraq Football Association) Al-Shorta
12	MF	Taleb Jaloub	1 July 1955 (aged 30)			(Iraq Football Association) Al-Rasheed
7	FW	Adnan Hamad	1 February 1961 (aged 24)			(Iraq Football Association) Al-Zawraa
11	FW	Emad Jassim	17 August 1960 (aged 24)			(Iraq Football Association) Al-Tayaran
14	FW	Anad Abid	3 August 1955 (aged 29)			(Iraq Football Association) Al-Rasheed
16	FW	Rahim Hameed	23 May 1963 (aged 22)			(Iraq Football Association) Al-Jaish
	MF	Mahdi Jassim	4 April 1956 (aged 29)			(Iraq Football Association) Al-Tayaran
	MF	Ismail Mohammed	19 January 1962 (aged 23)			(Iraq Football Association)
	FW	Najeh Rahim	27 September 1959 (aged 25)			(Iraq Football Association)
	FW	Hussein Ali Thajil	1 July 1958 (aged 27)			(Iraq Football Association) Al-Tayaran
		Thair Jassam	31 December 1959 (aged 25)			(Iraq Football Association) Al-Zawraa

=== Mauritania ===
Coach: (Germany) Gerhard Schmidt

No.	Pos.	Player	Date of birth (age)	Caps	Goals	Club
1	GK	Abdallah Ould Ahmed				(Football Federation of the Islamic Republic of Mauritania)
3	DF	Mohamed Ayoub				(Football Federation of the Islamic Republic of Mauritania)
5	DF	Amadou Cissé				(Football Federation of the Islamic Republic of Mauritania) ASAC Concorde
17	DF	Mokadem Ould Abdallah				(Football Federation of the Islamic Republic of Mauritania)
	DF	Moussa Mané				(Football Federation of the Islamic Republic of Mauritania) AS Armée Nationale
6	MF	Abdallah Ould Maouloud (c)				(Football Federation of the Islamic Republic of Mauritania) AS Garde Nationale
15	MF	Cheikh Fall				(Football Federation of the Islamic Republic of Mauritania)
16	MF	Moussa Traoré				(Football Federation of the Islamic Republic of Mauritania) ASC Police
10	MF	Habibi Djiap				(Football Federation of the Islamic Republic of Mauritania)
7	FW	Othmane Camara				(Football Federation of the Islamic Republic of Mauritania) AS Armée Nationale
13	FW	Pape Seck	17 September 1963 (aged 21)			(Football Federation of the Islamic Republic of Mauritania) ASC Sonader Ksar
14	FW	Amadou Boubacar				(Football Federation of the Islamic Republic of Mauritania)
	FW	Fala Ould Salem				(Football Federation of the Islamic Republic of Mauritania)
	FW	Bakary Diop				(Football Federation of the Islamic Republic of Mauritania) ASC Police
		Abdelkader Adam				(Football Federation of the Islamic Republic of Mauritania)
		Mamadou Anne				(Football Federation of the Islamic Republic of Mauritania)
		Mohamed Falil				(Football Federation of the Islamic Republic of Mauritania)
		Moustapha Ould Hamza				(Football Federation of the Islamic Republic of Mauritania)
		Djibril Wade				(Football Federation of the Islamic Republic of Mauritania) AS Douanes
		Abdelkader ...				(Football Federation of the Islamic Republic of Mauritania)
		Omar ...				(Football Federation of the Islamic Republic of Mauritania)
