= 1985 Arab Cup final =

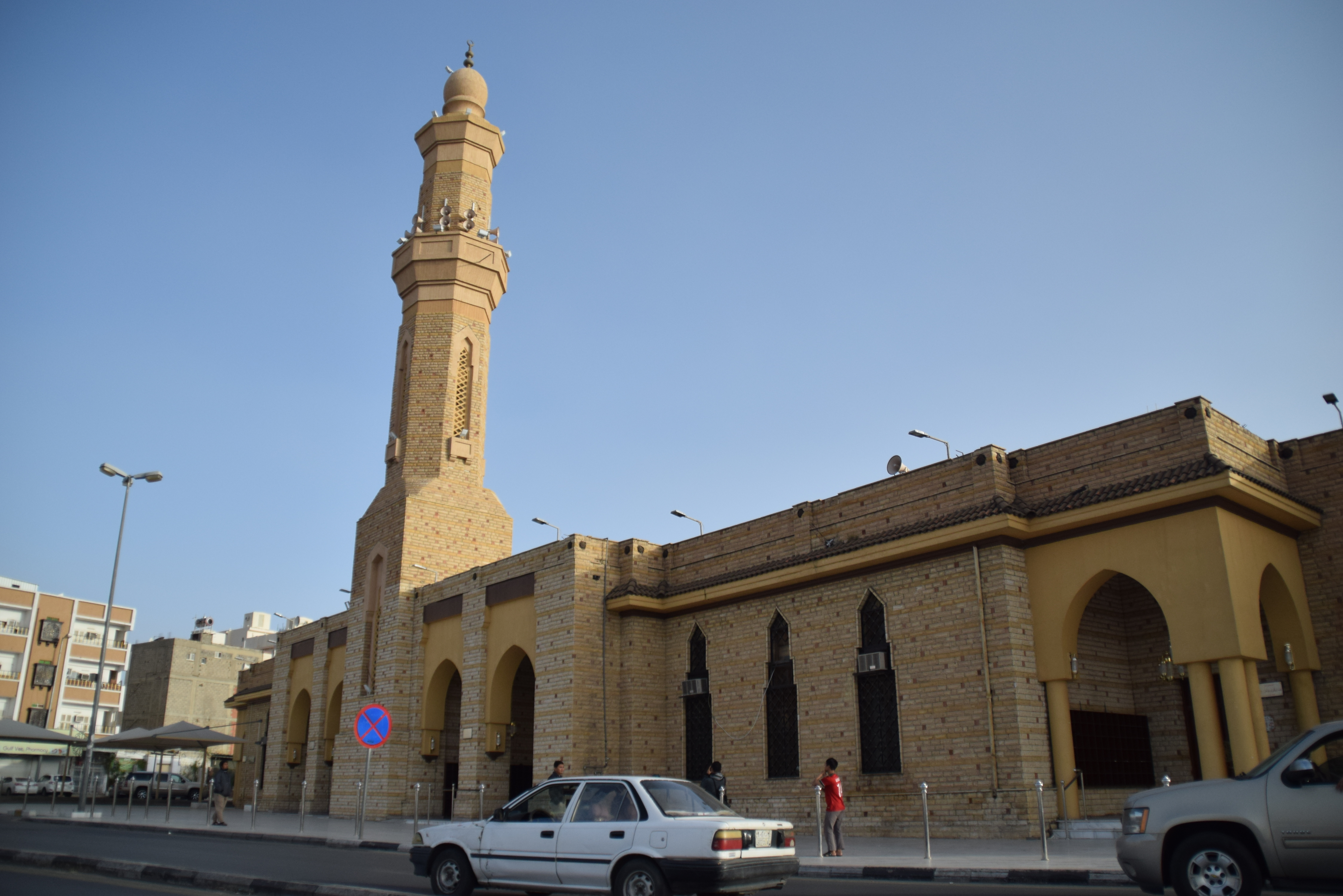
- Ta'if hosts the final tournament
- Event: 1985 Arab Cup
Iraq B	Bahrain
(Iraq)	(Bahrain)
1	0
- Date: 12 July 1985
- Venue: King Fahd Stadium, Ta'if
- Referee: Abdul Aziz Al-Salmi (Kuwait)

The 1985 Arab Cup final was a football match that took place on 12 July 1985, at the King Fahd Stadium in Ta'if, Saudi Arabia, to determine the winner of the 1985 Arab Cup. Iraq B defeated Bahrain 1–0, with Anad Abid scoring for Iraq, to help it win the tournament. Iraq played with the B team in the tournament.

== Road to the final ==
Iraq B		Bahrain	
Opponents	Results	Opponents	Results
Group stage
Bahrain	1–1	Iraq B	1–1
Mauritania	2–0	Mauritania	2–0
Semi-finals
Saudi Arabia	3–2	Qatar	1–1 (4–2 p)

== Match ==
=== Details ===
12 July 1985

Iraq B	1–0	Bahrain
Abid 21'	Report	Al-Harban (penalty missed) 16' (pen.)

King Fahd Stadium, Ta'if
Referee: Abdul Aziz Al-Salmi (Kuwait)

Iraq B	Bahrain

Iraq B:
GK	21	Suhail Saber
DF	2	Hameed Rashid
DF	3	Ghanim Oraibi
DF	4	Hassan Kamal
DF	5	Khaled Hadi
MF	10	Karim Hadi (c)
MF	13	Basim Qasim
MF	18	Taleb Jaloub
MF	7	Adnan Hamad	(yellow card) 71'
FW	11	Emad Jassim	(yellow card) 19'
FW	14	Anad Abid
Substitutes:
DF	–	Mahdi Jassim
Manager:
Anwar Jassam

Bahrain:
GK	22	Mohammed Saleh
DF	2	Ebrahim Zaid
DF	3	Salman Al-Harbi
DF	5	Adnan Daif (c)
DF	18	Abdul Karim Saif
MF	10	Ebrahim Al-Harban
MF	12	Marjan Eid
MF	14	Ali Hassan Yousif
FW	8	Ebrahim Farhan	(substituted off) 45'
FW	11	Hamad Mohammed
FW	19	Waleed Shwetar	(substituted off) 66'
Substitutes:
FW	4	Yacoub Hassan	(substituted on) 66'
FW	7	Ahmed Rashdan	(substituted on) 45'
FW	–	Khamis Eid
Manager:
(England) Keith Burkinshaw

Assistant referees:
Mohamed Larache (Morocco)
Mohammed Muhemeed (Saudi Arabia)
Fourth official:
Mohammed ... (Saudi Arabia)

Man of the Match:
... ... (...)
