= Football at the 1985 Arab Games – Men's team squads =

Below are the squads for the Football at the 1985 Arab Games, hosted by Rabat, Morocco, and took place between 4 and 16 August 1985.

== Group A ==
=== Morocco ===
Coach: (Brazil) José Faria

No.	Pos.	Player	Date of birth (age)	Caps	Goals	Club
	GK	Badou Zaki	2 April 1959 (aged 26)			(Royal Moroccan Football Federation) Wydad Casablanca
	GK	Salahdine Hmied	1 September 1961 (aged 23)			(Royal Moroccan Football Federation) FAR Rabat
	DF	Lahcen Ouadani	14 July 1959 (aged 26)			(Royal Moroccan Football Federation) FAR Rabat
	DF	Mustapha El Biyaz	12 February 1960 (aged 25)			(Royal Moroccan Football Federation) Kawkab Marrakech
	DF	Noureddine Bouyahyaoui	7 January 1955 (aged 30)			(Royal Moroccan Football Federation) KAC Kénitra
	DF	Abdelmajid Lamriss	12 February 1959 (aged 26)			(Royal Moroccan Football Federation) FAR Rabat
	DF	Hammou Fadili				(Royal Moroccan Football Federation) Chabab Mohammédia
	MF	Mohammed Sahil	11 October 1963 (aged 21)			(Royal Moroccan Football Federation) Wydad Casablanca
	MF	Abdelhak Souadi				(Royal Moroccan Football Federation) Raja Casablanca
	MF	Mohamed Timoumi	25 August 1960 (aged 24)			(Royal Moroccan Football Federation) FAR Rabat
	MF	Abdelaziz Souleimani	30 April 1958 (aged 27)			(Royal Moroccan Football Federation) Maghreb de Fès
	MF	Houcine Anafal	15 September 1952 (aged 32)			(Royal Moroccan Football Federation) KAC Kénitra
	MF	Abdallah Haidamou				
	FW	Fakhreddine Rajhi	3 October 1960 (aged 24)			(Royal Moroccan Football Federation) Wydad Casablanca
	FW	Abdeslam Laghrissi	5 January 1962 (aged 23)			(Royal Moroccan Football Federation) FAR Rabat
	FW	Khalid Labied	24 August 1955 (aged 29)			(Royal Moroccan Football Federation) FUS Rabat
	FW	Mustafa El Haddaoui	28 July 1961 (aged 24)			(Royal Moroccan Football Federation) Raja Casablanca

== Group B ==
=== Algeria B ===
Coach:

No.	Pos.	Player	Date of birth (age)	Caps	Goals	Club
	GK	Salah Kamel				(Algerian Football Federation) JS Bordj Ménaïel
	GK	Larbi El Hadi	27 May 1961 (aged 24)			(Algerian Football Federation) MA Hussein Dey
	GK	Benbella Benmiloud	1 January 1958 (aged 27)			(Algerian Football Federation) GCR Mascara
	DF	Kamel Naït Yahia				(Algerian Football Federation) JE Tizi-Ouzou
	DF	Youcef Meziane	16 September 1962 (aged 22)			(Algerian Football Federation) MA Hussein Dey
	DF	Nacer Bechouche	12 February 1962 (aged 23)			(Algerian Football Federation) USM El Harrach
	DF	Mohamed Aliouane				(Algerian Football Federation) JH Djazaïr
	DF	... Chaabane				
	MF	Djamel Amani	17 June 1962 (aged 23)			(Algerian Football Federation) CM Belcourt
	MF	Tahar Chérif El-Ouazzani	10 July 1967 (aged 18)			(Algerian Football Federation) MP Oran
	MF	Houari Belkhetouat	30 June 1965 (aged 20)			(Algerian Football Federation) ASC Oran
	MF	Mustapha Boukar	2 November 1962 (aged 22)			(Algerian Football Federation) ASC Oran
	MF	Nacer Badache	6 October 1961 (aged 23)			(Algerian Football Federation) USM El Harrach
	MF	Nacer Mekideche	24 November 1960 (aged 24)			(Algerian Football Federation) MA Hussein Dey
	MF	Saïd Belachia	15 November 1959 (aged 25)			(Algerian Football Federation) WKF Collo
	FW	Abdelkader Tlemçani	1 December 1963 (aged 21)			(Algerian Football Federation) ASC Oran
	FW	Kamel Djahmoune	16 June 1961 (aged 24)			(Algerian Football Federation) MP Alger
	FW	Belkacem Demdoum	25 November 1959 (aged 25)			(Algerian Football Federation) CM Belcourt
	FW	Abderrazak Bouznada				(Algerian Football Federation) JH Djazaïr

=== North Yemen ===
Coach: (Socialist Federal Republic of Yugoslavia) Miroslav Tichý

No.	Pos.	Player	Date of birth (age)	Caps	Goals	Club
	GK	Salah Salem Al-Azani				(Yemen Football Association) Al-Wehda Sanaa
	GK	Amin Al-Sanini	1 January 1965 (aged 20)			(Yemen Football Association) Ahli Sanaa
	DF	Mohammed Al-Yaremi				(Yemen Football Association) Ahli Sanaa
	DF	Faisal Asaad				(Yemen Football Association) Al-Tali'aa Taizz
	DF	Khaled Al-Arshi				(Yemen Football Association) Al-Wehda Sanaa
	DF	Ahmed Ghaleb				(Yemen Football Association) Ahli Taiz
	MF	Anwar Adini	1958 (aged 27)			(Yemen Football Association) Ahli Hodeidah
	MF	Jamal Hamdi (C)	1960 (aged 25)			(Yemen Football Association) Al-Majd Sanaa
	MF	Yahia Joara				(Yemen Football Association) Ahli Sanaa
	MF	Abdullah Al-Sanaani				(Yemen Football Association) Ahli Sanaa
	FW	Naser Al-Rouis				(Yemen Football Association) Shabab Al-Jeel

=== Saudi Arabia ===
Coach: Khalil Al-Zayani

No.	Pos.	Player	Date of birth (age)	Caps	Goals	Club
	GK	Sameer Sulaimani				(Saudi Arabian Football Federation) Al-Hilal
	GK	Abdullah Al-Deayea	1 December 1961 (aged 23)			(Saudi Arabian Football Federation) Al-Ta'ee
	DF	Bandar Serour				
	DF	Hussein Al-Bishi	13 November 1966 (aged 18)			
	DF	Sameer Abdulshaker	20 May 1960 (aged 25)			
	DF	Saleh Nu'eimeh	1 January 1959 (aged 26)			(Saudi Arabian Football Federation) Al-Hilal
	DF	Mohamed Abd Al-Jawad	28 November 1962 (aged 22)			(Saudi Arabian Football Federation) Al-Ahli
	DF	Naser Al Mansur				
	MF	Ahmad Al-Bishi				
	MF	Saleh Khalifa	2 May 1954 (aged 31)			(Saudi Arabian Football Federation) Al-Ettifaq
	MF	Fahad Al-Musaibeah	4 April 1961 (aged 24)			(Saudi Arabian Football Federation) Al-Hilal
	MF	Fahad Al-Bishi	9 October 1965 (aged 19)			(Saudi Arabian Football Federation) Al-Nassr
	MF	Naser Al-Dossari				
	MF	Yousef Khamees	16 August 1961 (aged 23)			
	FW	Jamal Mohammad				(Saudi Arabian Football Federation) Al-Ettifaq
	FW	Hussam Abu Dawud				
	FW	Talal Subhi				(Saudi Arabian Football Federation) Al-Ahli
	FW	Majed Abdullah	1 November 1959 (aged 25)			(Saudi Arabian Football Federation) Al-Nassr
	FW	Mohaisen Al-Jam'an	6 April 1966 (aged 19)			(Saudi Arabian Football Federation) Al-Nassr

== Group C ==
=== Iraq B ===
Coach: Anwar Jassam

No.	Pos.	Player	Date of birth (age)	Caps	Goals	Club
	GK	Raad Hammoudi (C)	20 April 1953 (aged 32)			(Iraq Football Association) Al-Shorta
	GK	Ahmad Jassim	4 May 1960 (aged 25)			(Iraq Football Association) Al-Rasheed
	GK	Suhail Saber	1 June 1962 (aged 23)			(Iraq Football Association) Al-Talaba
	DF	Khalil Allawi	6 September 1958 (aged 26)			(Iraq Football Association) Al-Rasheed
	DF	Ghanim Oraibi	16 August 1961 (aged 23)			(Iraq Football Association) Al-Shabab
	DF	Samir Shaker	28 February 1958 (aged 27)			(Iraq Football Association) Al-Rasheed
	DF	Basim Qasim	22 February 1959 (aged 26)			(Iraq Football Association) Al-Shorta
	DF	Taleb Chaloub	1 July 1955 (aged 30)			
	DF	Khaled Hadi	1 February 1962 (aged 23)			
	DF	Hameed Rashid	8 January 1963 (aged 22)			(Iraq Football Association) Al-Zawraa
	MF	Karim Hadi	1 February 1963 (aged 22)			
	MF	Basil Gorgis	6 September 1961 (aged 23)			(Iraq Football Association) Al-Shabab
	MF	Emad Jassim	17 August 1960 (aged 24)			
	MF	Mahdi Jassim	4 March 1954 (aged 31)			
	MF	Shaker Mahmoud	5 May 1960 (aged 25)			(Iraq Football Association) Al-Shabab
	MF	Ismail Mohammed Sharif	17 April 1962 (aged 23)			(Iraq Football Association) Al-Shabab
	MF	Thair Jassam	31 December 1959 (aged 25)			
	MF	Hussein Ali Thajil	1 July 1958 (aged 27)			
	FW	Ahmed Radhi	27 March 1964 (aged 21)			(Iraq Football Association) Al-Rasheed
	FW	Anad Abid	3 August 1954 (aged 31)			(Iraq Football Association) Al-Rasheed
	FW	Rahim Hameed	23 May 1963 (aged 22)			(Iraq Football Association) Al-Jaish
	FW	Adnan Hamad	1 February 1961 (aged 24)			(Iraq Football Association) Al-Zawraa
	FW	Najeh Rahim	27 September 1959 (aged 25)			
	FW	Hassan Kamal	1 July 1964 (aged 21)			
