= Tunisia national football team =

Men's association football team

Tunisia
- Nickname(s): نسور قرطاج (Eagles of Carthage)
- Association: Tunisian Football Federation (TFF)
- Confederation: CAF (Africa)
- Sub-confederation: UNAF (North Africa)
- Head coach: Mouin Chaâbani
- Captain: Ferjani Sassi
- Most caps: Radhi Jaïdi & Ferjani Sassi (105)
- Top scorer: Issam Jemâa (36)
- Home stadium: Hammadi Agrebi Stadium
- FIFA code: TUN
First colours	Second colours	Third colours

FIFA ranking
- Current: 64 ▼3 (18 November 2026)
- Highest: 14 (April – May 2018)
- Lowest: 65 (July 2010)

First international
- Tunisia 4–2 Libya (Tunis, Tunisia; 2 June 1957)

Biggest win
- Tunisia 8–1 Taiwan (Rome, Italy; 18 August 1960); Tunisia 7–0 Togo (Tunis, Tunisia; 7 January 2000); Tunisia 7–0 Malawi (Tunis, Tunisia; 26 March 2005); Tunisia 8–1 Djibouti (Tunis, Tunisia; 12 June 2015)

Biggest defeat
- Hungary 10–1 Tunisia (Budapest, Hungary; 24 July 1960)

World Cup
- Appearances: 7 (first in 1978)
- Best result: Group stage (1978, 1998, 2002, 2006, 2018, 2022, 2026)

Africa Cup of Nations
- Appearances: 22 (first in 1962)
- Best result: Champions (2004)

African Nations Championship
- Appearances: 2 (first in 2011)
- Best result: Champions (2011)

Arab Cup
- Appearances: 4 (first in 1963)
- Best result: Champions (1963)

Confederations Cup
- Appearances: 1 (first in 2005)
- Best result: Group stage (2005)
Medal record
Men's Football
Africa Cup of Nations
Gold medal – first place	2004 Tunisia	Team
Silver medal – second place	1965 Tunisia	Team
Silver medal – second place	1996 South Africa	Team
Bronze medal – third place	1962 Ethiopia	Team
African Nations Championship
Gold medal – first place	2011 Sudan	Team
African Games
Silver medal – second place	1991 Cairo	Team
Bronze medal – third place	2007 Algiers	Team
Arab Cup
Gold medal – first place	1963 Lebanon	Team
Silver medal – second place	2021 Qatar	Team
Palestine Cup of Nations
Gold medal – first place	1973 Libya	Team
Arab Games
Silver medal – second place	1957 Lebanon	Team
Mediterranean Games
Gold medal – first place	2001 Tunis	Team
Silver medal – second place	1971 Izmir	Team
Bronze medal – third place	1975 Alger	Team
Bronze medal – third place	2013 Mersin	Team
- Website: ftf.org.tn (in French)

The Tunisia national football team represents Tunisia in men's international association football competitions, and is controlled by the Tunisian Football Federation (TFF). The team competes under the Confederation of African Football (CAF) on the continental level, and is affiliated with FIFA for global competitions. Additionally, the team is a member of the Union of North African Football (UNAF) and the Union of Arab Football Associations (UAFA). The team is colloquially known as Eagles of Carthage by fans and the media, with the bald eagle serving as its symbol. Their home kit is primarily white and their away kit is red, which is a reference to the national flag of the country. The team has qualified for the FIFA World Cup seven times and the Africa Cup of Nations 22 times, and has appeared in four editions of Summer Olympics and participated once in the FIFA Confederation Cup. Since 2001, Tunisia's home stadium is the Hammadi Agrebi Stadium in Radès, Tunis.

Tunisia's first match after independence was against Libya, which they won 4–2. The team qualified for the FIFA World Cup for the first time in 1978 as the only representative of the continent, and became the first African and Arab team to win a World Cup match by beating Mexico 3–1 in the first game. Tunisia holds the most consecutive appearances in the Africa Cup of Nations, with 17, qualifying for every tournament between 1994 and 2025. By winning the 2004 African Cup of Nations, they qualified for the 2005 FIFA Confederations Cup and was eliminated in the group stage. The team qualified twice for the African Nations Championship, winning the title in their first appearance in 2011, while also competing in the FIFA Arab Cup three times, winning the title in the inaugural edition in 1963 and finishing second in 2021. Radhi Jaïdi, with 105 international matches, holds the record for the number of matches played for Tunisia while Issam Jemâa, with 36 goals, is their all-time highest scorer. Their highest-ever FIFA Men's World Ranking was 14th in April and May 2018, while their lowest rank was 65th in July 2010.

On 13 October 2025, Tunisia became the first team in history to qualify for the World Cup without conceding a goal, during the 2026 World Cup qualifying campaign.

== History ==
=== 1928–1956: French protectorate of Tunisia and beginning ===
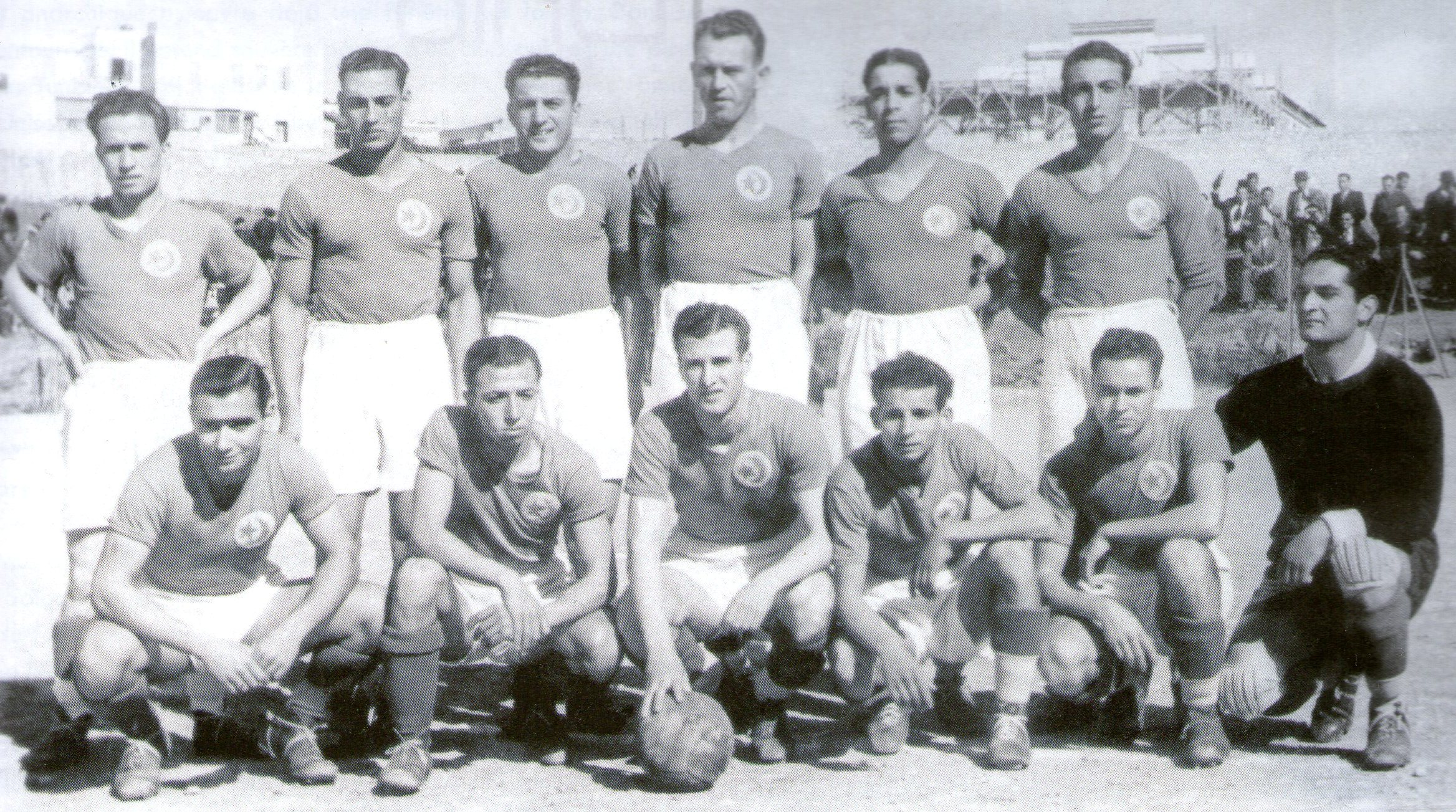
The Tunisian football team in 1939.

Before independence, an unofficial team was formed in 1928, comprising the best Tunisian players from the Tunisian League. The team's first match was on 11 March 1928, against the France national football B team; Tunisia lost 8–2. Their next friendlies, against the same team on 23 March 1930 and 26 March 1933, also resulted in heavy defeats: 0–5 and 1–6 respectively.

Tunisia had to wait until 1932 for their first match win: a 1–0 victory over French Algeria. Most of the matches that Tunisia played in the 30s and 40s were against French teams, whether it was French Algeria, the French military team or the France B team, in addition to a match against the France national team in 1941. Most of these matches were played at the Stade Vélodrome in Tunis.

=== 1956–1962: Post independence, First international participation ===
Tunisia gained independence from France on 20 March 1956. The Tunisian Football Federation was founded on 29 March 1957 and the Tunisian team played a match with Austrian club FC Admira Wacker Mödling on 30 December of the same year, winning 4–1. Tunisia became affiliated with FIFA and the Confederation of African Football in 1960. The independent Tunisia played their first match against Algeria on 1 June 1957, in the midst of the Algerian War, in which Tunisia lost 2–1. They played their first official match at the 1957 Arab Games where they won against Libya 4–3 after scoring the first Tunisian goal in an official competition by Farzit. They won against Iraq 4–2 and Lebanon 4–2 before losing in the final against Syria 3–1. In 1960, Yugoslavian Milan Kristić became the first foreign manager. The national team qualified for the 1960 Summer Olympics, their first international event after beating Malta, Morocco and Sudan. In the Olympic Games, the team suffered three defeats: against Poland 6–1, Argentina 2–1, and Denmark 3–1. Frane Matošić was appointed as the second Yugoslav coach of Tunisia after Kristić led Tunisia to qualify for the Olympics.

=== 1962–1978: Golden generation, First World Cup participation ===
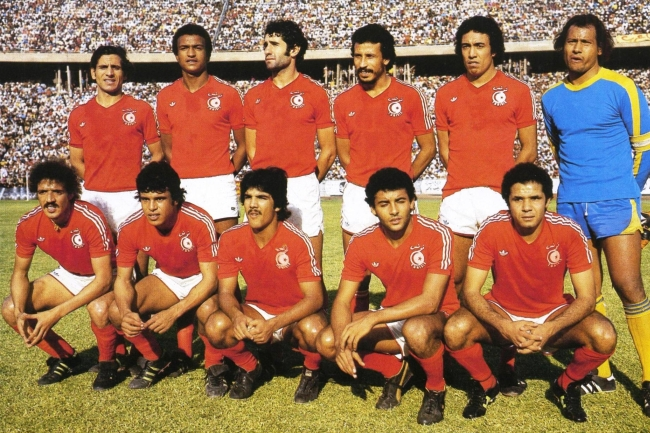
Tunisia at the 1978 FIFA World Cup qualification against Egypt.

In 1962, Tunisia entered the African Cup of Nations qualifiers for the first time. The team qualified for the tournament after beating Morocco and Nigeria, and went on to finish third after beating Uganda in the third-place match. The team won the 1963 Arab Cup, after winning against Syria, Jordan, Lebanon, and Kuwait. Tunisia also qualified for the 1963 Africa Cup of Nations, and CAF decided that Tunisia would host the 1965 AFCON, making the final after beating Ethiopia 4–0 in the opening match in Stade Chedly Zouiten, losing 3–2 to Ghana in extra-time of the final. Despite this early success, Tunisia did not enter the Cup of Nations again until 1976, and did not qualify until 1978. In 1973, the team entered the Palestine Cup of Nations and won in dominant fashion, winning all six of their matches overcoming Syria, Egypt, Palestine, Yemen and Iraq, scoring 19 goals. In February 1975, after a short stint with Hungarian manager André Nagy, Abdelmajid Chetali was hired. Tunisia qualified for their FIFA World Cup debut in 1978. Tunisia defeated Mexico 3–1, but were defeated by Poland 1–0, and drew scoreless against defending champion West Germany.

=== 1978–1994: Decline and Missing six editions of the AFCON ===
Tunisia squad in 1981.

Tunisia against Senegal at the 1982 African Cup of Nations qualification.

After their inaugural World Cup, Tunisia experienced a decline. Between 1980 and 1992, the team managed to qualify for only two tournaments: the 1982 African Cup of Nations, and the 1988 Summer Olympics. In both, they were knocked out in the first round. They, however, reached the last round of the 1986 World Cup qualifiers by beating Nigeria before being defeated by Algeria. Former Cameroon manager Jean Vincent was hired but the team was unable to qualify for the 1988 African Cup in Morocco after a defeat against Algeria.

The team experienced poor results in the African Games with defeats against Cameroon, Madagascar and Kenya. Taoufik Ben Othman, assistant manager in 1978, improved Tunisia's results, as they qualified for the Olympic Games after surpassing Morocco and Egypt in the qualifiers. However, he was removed days before the start of the competition after poor results in the 1988 Arab Cup and failure to win in their matches against Saudi Arabia, Lebanon, Egypt and Iraq, as well as friendlies against Malta, Finland and East Germany. Polish manager Antoni Piechniczek was temporarily appointed and supervised the team in the first round of 1990 World Cup qualifiers and also in the finals of the Olympic Games; in the latter, Tunisia tied China 0–0 and Sweden 2–2 and lost to West Germany 4–1. Mokhtar Tlili was appointed manager, however, he still missed the African Cup in 1990 after a defeat to Senegal. Piechniczek returned but still failed to qualify for the 1990 World Cup. Despite missing the 1992 African Cup, the federation renewed confidence in him because of the respectable performance he had given in the qualifiers; an early exit from the World Cup qualifiers for 1994 contributed to his dismissal after a draw with Morocco. Youssef Zouaoui replaced him; Tunisia hosted the 1994 African Cup of Nations replacing original hosts Zaire, but finished at the bottom of the group, after a 2–0 loss to Mali and a draw with Zaire.

=== 1994–2002: Beginning of Resurgence, 1996 AFCON runners-up ===
Henryk Kasperczak became the new manager after Tunisia hosted the 1994 African Cup of Nations. Tunisia qualified for the 1996 AFCON and finished second in their group, putting them through to the quarter-finals. Tunisia went on to beat Gabon in the quarter-finals and Zambia in the semi-finals, to reach their first major final in 31 years, but lost to host country South Africa 2–0. Tunisia reached the quarter-finals of the 1998 African Cup of Nations in the lead of the group with a win over DR Congo, Togo and a defeat from Ghana, where they were eliminated in a penalty shootout by host country Burkina Faso. The team also qualified for that year's World Cup after a 20-year absence: they again failed to advance from the group stages, losing 2–0 to England and 1–0 to Colombia, and drawing 1–1 with Romania. Kasperczak was sacked and replaced with Francesco Scoglio, who guided the team to the 2000 African Cup of Nations, where they finished in fourth place after losing to Cameroon in the semi-finals. The following year, Scoglio departed to rejoin Genoa CFC, sparking a period of severe instability. Eckhard Krautzun initially took over and guided the team to a second World Cup appearance, but then resigned, citing interference from the Tunisian FA with his coaching. Henri Michel replaced him, but was sacked when Tunisia crashed out of the 2002 African Cup of Nations without scoring a single goal after scoreless draws with Senegal and Zambia and a defeat from Egypt. Finally, Ammar Souayah took over in time for the 2002 World Cup; the team drew in friendlies with Norway and South Korea and were defeated by Denmark and Slovenia. In the finals, Tunisia exited the tournament in the group stage, drawing 1–1 with Belgium, losing 2–0 to Russia and co-hosts Japan, prompting a search for a new manager.

=== 2002–2008: Roger Lemerre era, 2004 AFCON champions ===
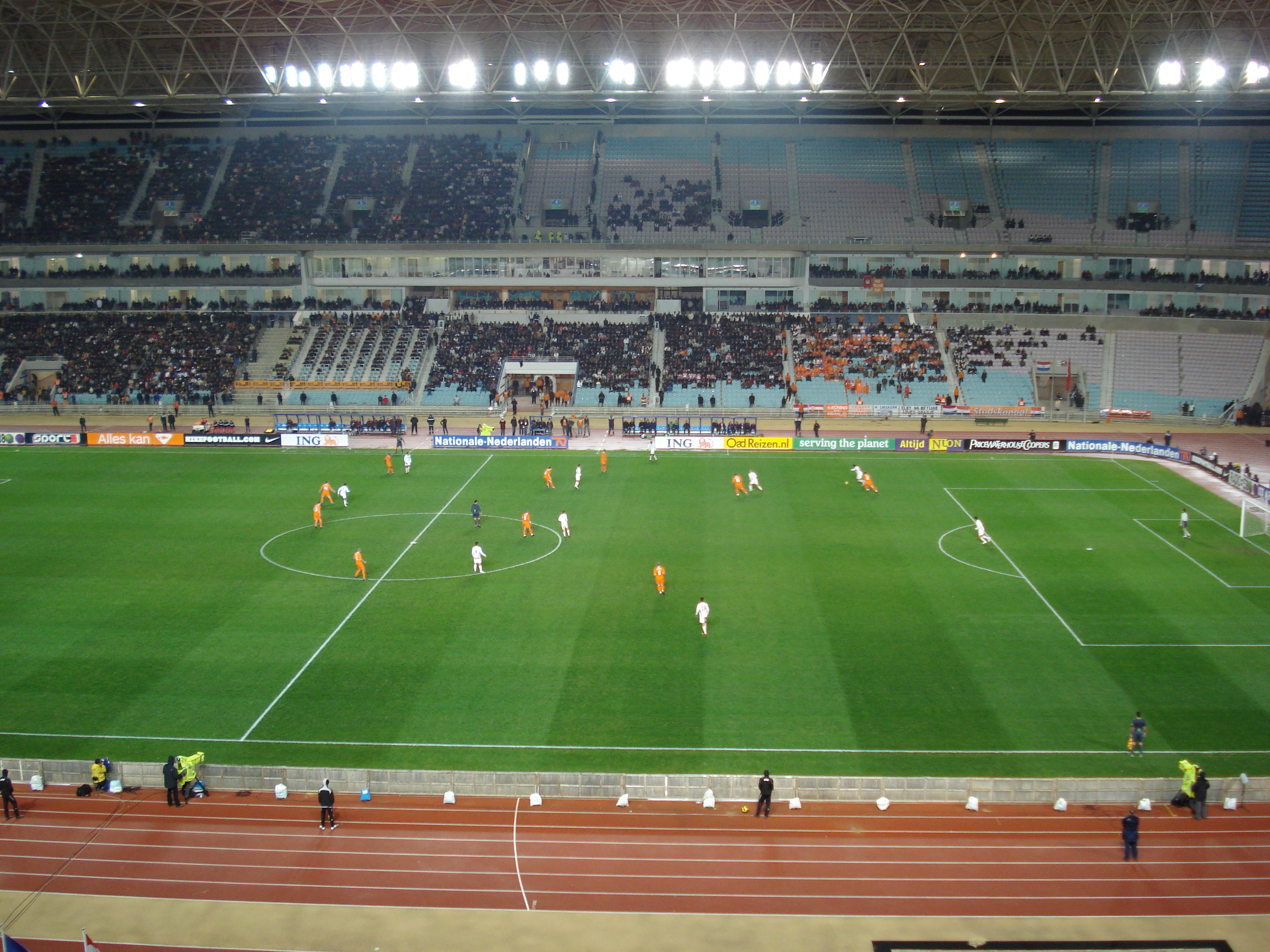
Tunisia against Netherlands in a friendly game at the 7 November Stadium in 2009.

In September 2002, the Tunisian Football Federation announced that it was finalizing a contract with former France manager Roger Lemerre. Tunisia hosted the 2004 African Cup of Nations, winning the group. They defeated Senegal in the quarter-finals, and Nigeria in the semi-finals. Tunisia built a 1–0 lead after four minutes with Mehdi Nafti's concentration pushed by Francileudo Santos, before Morocco levelled. Tunisia restored their lead, giving them their first African Cup of Nations title. They also won the CAF's African National Team of the Year award. Lemerre became the first manager to win two different continental tournaments, having previously won Euro 2000 with France. As a result, Tunisia qualified for the 2005 FIFA Confederations Cup in Germany, playing the hosts, Argentina and Australia. The only points they would win was a victory over Australia. Before their 2006 World Cup appearance, Lemerre took the Tunisians to a training camp in Switzerland, where they played international friendlies against Swiss clubs. Tunisia would only record one draw in Germany, against Saudi Arabia, losing against Spain and Ukraine. Hatem Trabelsi announced his retirement from international football after eight years, and Lemerre led Tunisia to the 2008 African Cup of Nations. Tunisia won their 2008 AFCON group after a draw in the opening match against Senegal 2–2, a 3–1 victory over South Africa, and a goalless draw against Angola. They then lost against Cameroon 3–2 in extra time.

=== 2008–2014: Disappointments and missing the World Cup ===
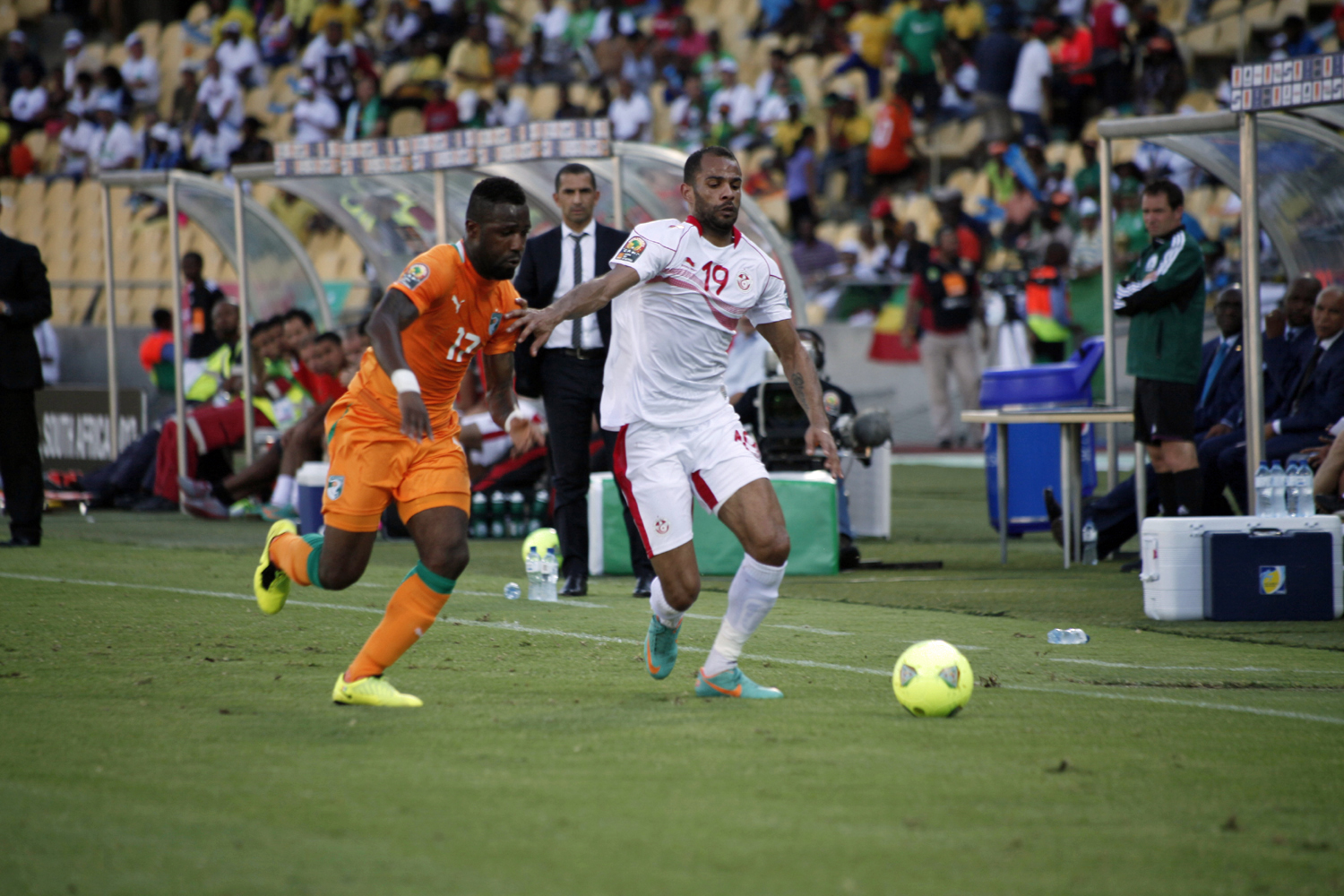
Tunisia against Ivory Coast at the 2013 Africa Cup of Nations in South Africa.

Portuguese Humberto Coelho was appointed as the new manager on 3 June 2008. Coelho would fail to qualify for the 2010 World Cup. Faouzi Benzarti was appointed as the new manager, and was also sacked after Tunisia were eliminated from the group stage in the 2010 Africa Cup of Nations. In June 2010, Bertrand Marchand was appointed manager for a two-year contract. After a series of horrendous results, Tunisia fell to 65th in the FIFA World Rankings, the worst in its history. Sami Trabelsi was appointed, and the team qualified for the 2012 Africa Cup of Nations, where they were eliminated in the quarter-finals after a defeat by Ghana.

In the 2013 Africa Cup of Nations, Tunisia snatched a late winner against Algeria, before a defeat by Ivory Coast, 3–0. The last match ended with a 1–1 draw against Togo. In February 2013, Nabil Maâloul replaced Sami Trabelsi; in their first two 2014 World Cup qualification matches, Tunisia beat Sierra Leone 2–1 and clinched a 2–2 draw in Freetown. On 16 June, during the fifth round of the group stage, Tunisia tied 1–1 against Equatorial Guinea. A 2–0 loss to Cape Verde on 7 September all but eliminated Tunisia; however, Tunisia advanced after FIFA disqualified Cape Verde for cheating. They would then be knocked out by Cameroon.

=== 2014–2022: Renaissance and two World Cup participations ===
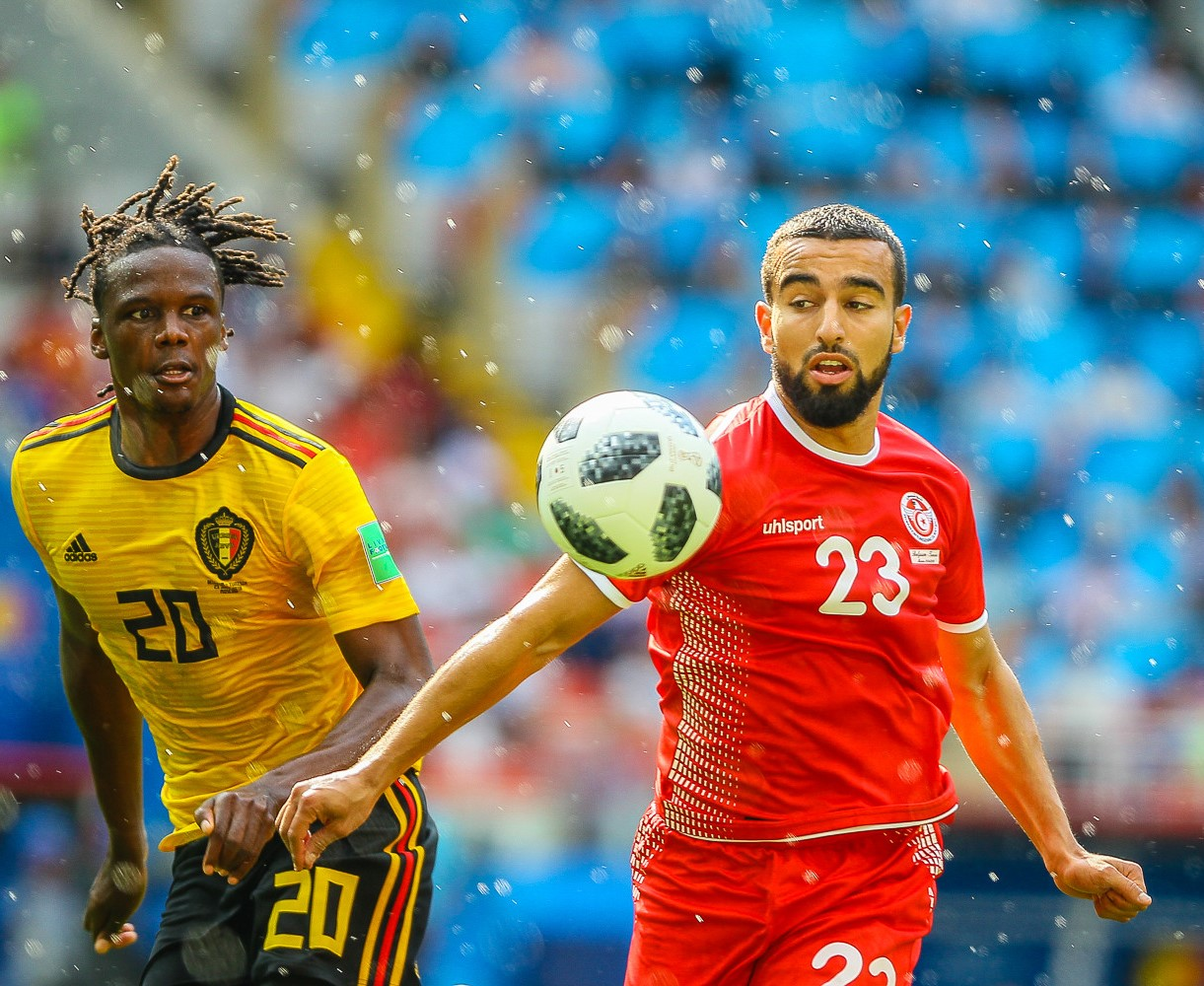
Tunisia against Belgium at the 2018 FIFA World Cup in Russia.

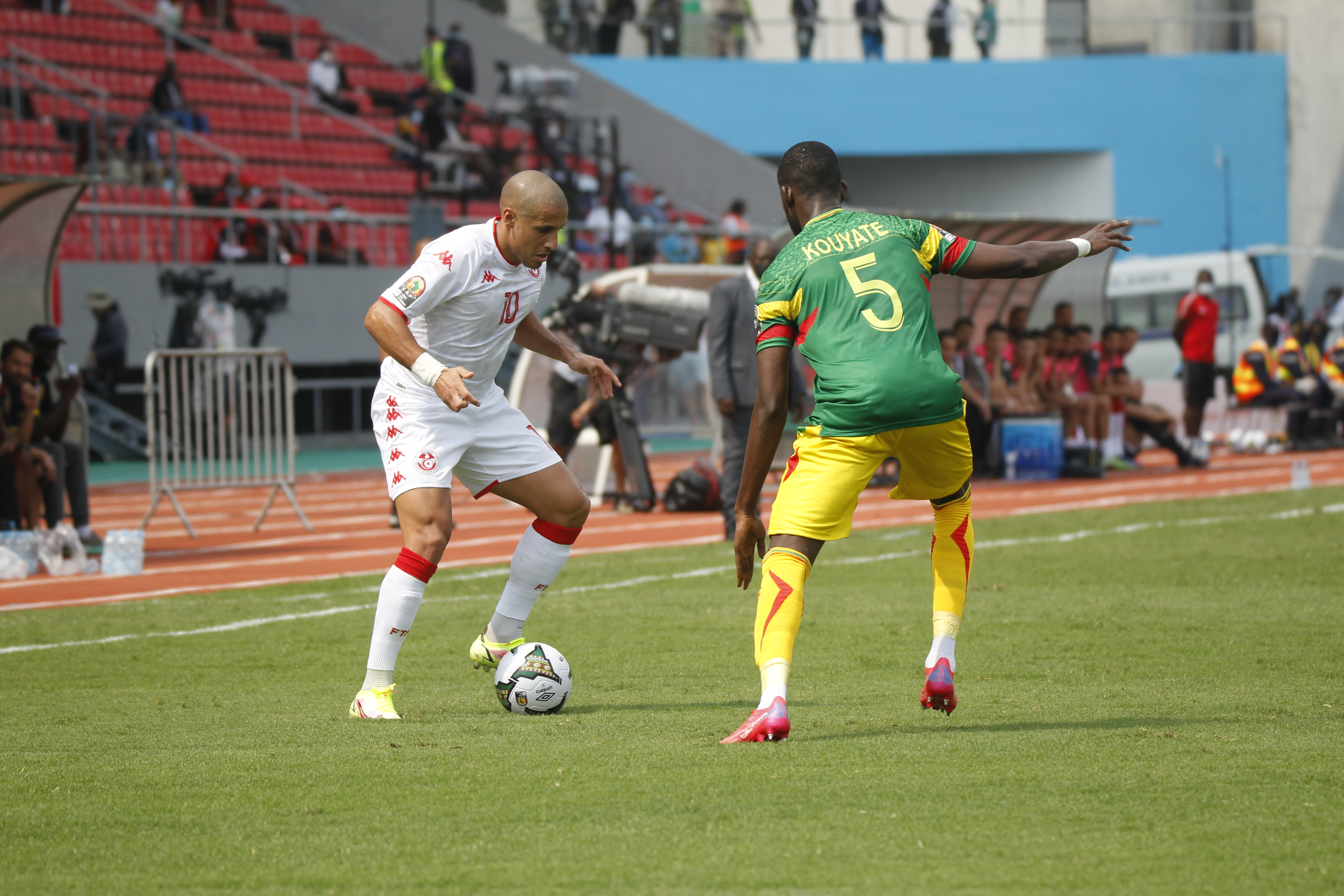
Tunisia against Mali at the 2021 Africa Cup of Nations in Cameroon. The match stopped at the 85th minute.

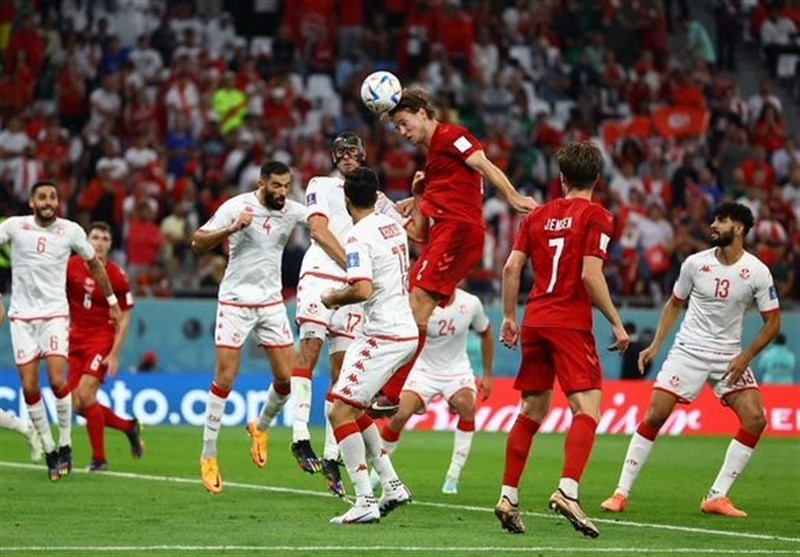
Tunisia against Denmark at the 2022 FIFA World Cup in Qatar.

Belgian manager Georges Leekens was appointed in early 2014; early results included a 1–1 draw against Colombia and a 1–0 win over South Korea, both in friendly matches. Under Leekens, the team climbed from 49th to 22nd in the FIFA rankings. Tunisia qualified for the 2015 African Cup of Nations, and topped their group for the first time since 2008, winning against Zambia and drawing with Cape Verde and DR Congo. They were eliminated in the quarter-finals after a defeat to host Equatorial Guinea. In July 2015, Henryk Kasperczak returned as manager after 17 years. He managed to qualify the team for the 2017 African Cup, and reached the quarter-finals of the competition after beating Algeria and Zimbabwe, before losing against Burkina Faso.

On 27 April 2017, Nabil Maâloul returned as manager despite the disapproval of the Tunisian supporters following the failure at the 2014 World Cup qualifiers, but this time he qualified Tunisia for the 2018 World Cup in Russia. Tunisia's qualification for the World Cup and its results in friendlies against Iran and Costa Rica, led to its rise to 14th place in the FIFA World Rankings, their best ever. Before the World Cup, Tunisia drew with Turkey and Portugal, in addition to a narrow defeat against Spain 1–0. Despite this, in the World Cup, Tunisia were once again eliminated from the group stage. In the first match, England won 2–1. Belgium defeated the North Africans 5–2, and in Tunisia's last game against Panama, the Arab nation won 2–1. Tunisia qualified for the 2019 Africa Cup of Nations with new manager Alain Giresse; the new manager would only record three ties, against Angola, Mali, and Mauritania to qualify for the round 16. They eventually would win against Ghana, and Madagascar 3–0 in the quarter-finals, to qualify for the semi-finals for the first time in 15 years, losing to Senegal 1–0 in extra time. In September 2021, the national team began its 2022 FIFA World Cup qualification campaign with three consecutive victories against Equatorial Guinea, Zambia, and Mauritania; they would then draw Mauritania 0–0 and lose against Equatorial Guinea 1–0, to advance for the third round on the top of the group.

Qatar hosted the 2021 FIFA Arab Cup; Tunisia started with a 5–1 win against Mauritania. They then suffered an unexpected defeat to Syria, before winning against the United Arab Emirates. In the quarter-finals Tunisia won against Oman 2–1, and scored a 95th minute winner against Egypt in the semi-finals. Tunisia faced Algeria in the final, losing 2–0. The 2021 Africa Cup of Nations was postponed to early 2022; in the group stage, Tunisia began with a 1–0 defeat against Mali, with Zambian referee Janny Sikazwe ending the match in the 85th minute. In the second match, the team achieved a 4–0 victory over Mauritania, and lost against Gambia in the last group match. Tunisia defeated Nigeria in the round of 16, and were eliminated by Burkina Faso.

In March, Tunisia qualified for their sixth World Cup, the 2022 tournament in Qatar, the first hosted by an Arab nation, after beating Mali 1–0 on aggregate, taking revenge for the earlier loss in the AFCON. They then defeated Chile and Japan to win the 2022 Kirin Cup Soccer title for the first time, and Ferjani Sassi was named the best player of the tournament while his compatriot Issam Jebali finished as the top scorer with two goals. Tunisia played two pre-World Cup friendlies in France in September 2022, defeating Comoros 1−0 in Croissy-sur-Seine and losing 5−1 to Brazil at the Parc des Princes in Paris. With the exception of Brazil, Tunisia's relatively good forms increased confidence on the side to break the knockout stage taboo as Tunisia found themselves grouped with world champions France, European dark horse Denmark and Asian minnows Australia. In Group D, Tunisia drew Euro 2020 semi-finalists Denmark 0−0 in a rather decent display by the African side. But a 0−1 loss against Australia followed, severely hampering Tunisia's odds to progress. A 1−0 victory over France courtesy of a goal from Wahbi Khazri was not enough to seal Tunisia's place in the last 16 as Australia's Mathew Leckie goal against Denmark meant the Asian representative placed second.

=== 2023–Present: Ongoing Coaching Crisis, Decline and Fall ===
After the World Cup, the federation rejected Kadri's resignation and extended his contract until 2024. The team topped their 2023 Africa Cup of Nations qualification group after defeating Libya twice, Botswana 3–0, and a loss against Equatorial Guinea 0–1. The team's performances began to decline, especially after the Tunisian Football Federation president, Wadie Jary, was imprisoned after accusations of financial corruption were proven. On 17 November 2023, the team started 2026 FIFA World Cup qualification with two victories against São Tomé and Príncipe 4–0 and Malawi 1–0. At the 2023 Africa Cup of Nations, Tunisia was drawn alongside Mali, Namibia and South Africa.

The team endured a poor performance at the tournament, as they lost to Namibia 0–1, before drawing their latter group matches against Mali 1–1 and South Africa 0–0, being eliminated from the group stage. Kadri was dismissed and Montasser Louhichi was appointed in his place temporarily. In March, the team participated in the Egyptian Capital Cup, a friendly tournament affiliated with the 2024 FIFA Series. The team played in the semi-final against Croatia and, after a 0–0 draw, lost on penalties 4–5. In the third-place match, the team faced New Zealand; the match also ended 0–0, which ended with a 4–2 penalty shootout victory and a third-place finish for Tunisia. Louhichi continued to lead the team in the third and fourth rounds of the World Cup qualifiers. On 1 July, Faouzi Benzarti was appointed coach for the fourth time. Under Benzarti's leadership, the team started 2025 Africa Cup of Nations qualification with two wins against Madagascar 1–0 and Gambia 2–1. Tunisia then suffered a defeat at home against Comoros 0–1 and drew them away 1–1, prompting Benzati's resignation before being replaced by Kais Yaâkoubi, who led Tunisia to the AFCON.

On February 10, 2025, Sami Trabelsi returned to the team as coach twelve years after his departure, leading the team to qualifying for the 2026 FIFA World Cup. On October 13, 2025, Tunisia became the first team in history to qualify for the World Cup without conceding a goal, during the 2026 World Cup qualifying campaign. On November 18, at Stade Pierre-Mauroy in Lille, Tunisia achieved a historic 1–1 draw against Brazil in front of 40,000 spectators. The team entered the 2025 FIFA Arab Cup in Qatar missing key players due to their European clubs refusing to release them and conflicting schedule to the also upcoming 2025 Africa Cup of Nations, resulting in their elimination from the group stage after a loss, a draw, and a win. On June 15, 2026, Tunisia lost 5-1 to Sweden in their first group match of the 2026 FIFA World Cup, and subsequently lost 4-0 to Japan in their second group game, eliminating them from the tournament.

== Home stadium ==
From 1956, the year of independence, until 1967, the 18,000-seat Chedly Zouiten Stadium was the Tunisian National Stadium. The stadium hosted matches of the 1965 African Cup of Nations, including the final between Tunisia and Ghana, and matches from the 1994 African Cup of Nations. In 1967, the El Menzah Stadium, with a capacity of 39,858, was opened; it was built to host the 1967 Mediterranean Games. Tunisia's first match at the stadium was played on 8 September 1967 against Libya. On 11 December 1977, the stadium witnessed Tunisia qualifying for the World Cup for the first time in its history. It was completely renovated for the 1994 African Cup of Nations, and later hosted some matches for the 2004 African Cup of Nations. Tunisia's last match at El Menzah was on 4 January 2017 against Uganda, and the stadium has been undergoing renovations since 2022.

In 2001, Hammadi Agrebi Stadium (opened as 7 November Stadium) was inaugurated as Tunisia's national stadium ahead of the 2001 Mediterranean Games. Located in the Radès Olympic City in Radès, in the southern suburb of the city Tunis, has an all-seater capacity of 60,000 as the largest stadium in the country. Tunisia's first match at the stadium was on 21 August 2002 against France. In 2004, the stadium hosted Tunisia's six matches during the 2004 African Cup of Nations, which the team won for the first time after defeating Morocco in the final.

The Tunisians often host their matches at the Mustapha Ben Jannet Stadium in Monastir which has a capacity of 20,000. In addition, there are many other venues that host games, such as the Sousse Olympic Stadium, which hosted a friendly match between Tunisia and Switzerland on 14 November 2012 and also hosted a match in the 2012 Africa Cup of Nations qualification. On 15 November 2016, The team played their first match at the Gabès Municipal Stadium against Mauritania. Since 2017, the team has played all its home matches at Hammadi Agrebi Stadium, until 2026 when Taieb Mhiri Stadium in Sfax was renovated and became a second home ground for the team.

Tunisia national football team home stadiums
Image	Stadium	Capacity	Location	Last match
	Hammadi Agrebi Stadium	60,000	Radès	v Botswana (29 September 2026; 2027 AFCON qualification)
	Taieb Mhiri Stadium	12,600	Sfax	v Libya (13 November 2026; 2027 AFCON qualification)

== Rivalries ==
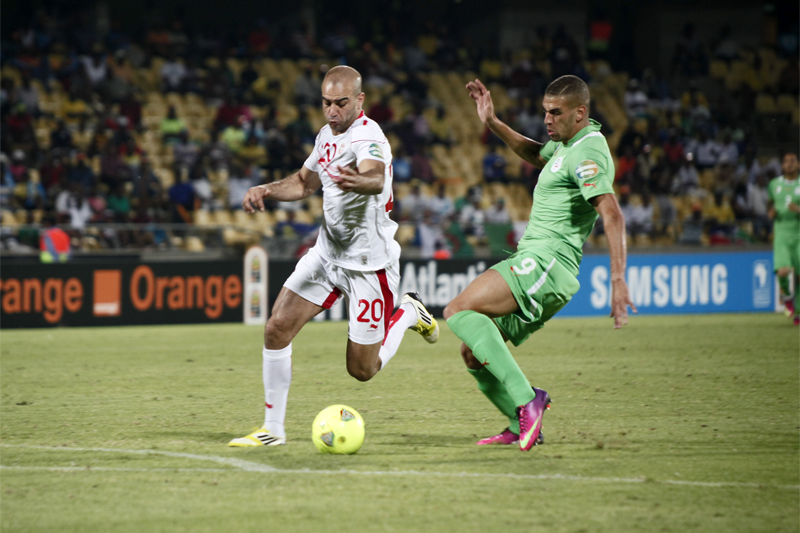
Tunisia against Algeria at the 2013 Africa Cup of Nations in South Africa.

Tunisia's main football rivals are its neighbours Algeria, Morocco, and Egypt, with which it shares close cultural and political relations. Tunisia have played 45 games against Algeria. After the independence of Algeria, a friendly match took place at the Stade Chedly Zouiten. The teams also met three times in the qualifying phase of the World Cup in 1970, 1978 and 1986. The overall record slightly favours the Algerians with 16 wins, 14 draws and 14 losses. Algeria and Tunisia have played three times in official competitions: twice in the Africa Cup of Nations, in 2013 and 2017, which Tunisia won both times, and once in the FIFA Arab Cup in 2021, which Algeria won. Egypt and Tunisia have met 35 times in both official and friendly matches. Tunisia have won 16 matches against Egypt's 11, while 8 matches have ended in a draw. Tunisia and Morocco have played 50 games since their independence from France in 1956. Tunisia first played Morocco in 1962 World Cup qualification on 30 October 1960 in Casablanca. Many matches were played in World Cup qualification as they met in 1962, 1970, 1978, 1990, 1994 and 2006 qualifying. They also met four times in the African Cup of Nations. Two of them ended in a draw in 1978 and 2000 and the other two matches ended up as a Tunisian win in the 2004 and 2012 AFCONs.

== Team image ==
=== Supporters ===
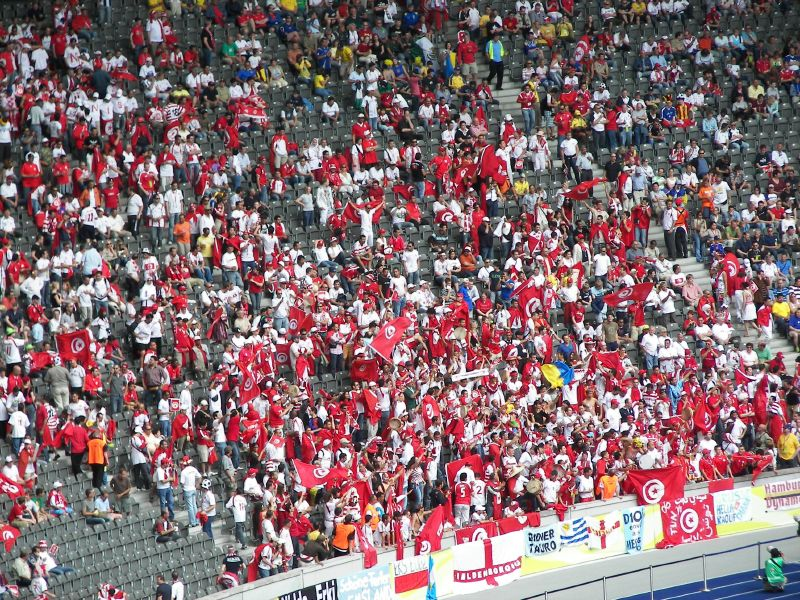
Tunisian fans in Berlin at the 2006 FIFA World Cup.

Fans of the Tunisian national team display the country's national flag, usually with an emphasis on the red element.

=== Kit manufacturer ===
Period	Kit supplier	Ref
1956–1969	Local equipment	
1970–1993	(Germany) Adidas	
1994–1995	(Tunisia) Guidas	
1996–1997	(Italy) Kappa	
1998–1999	(Italy) Lotto	
2000–2001	(Germany) Uhlsport	
2002–2011	(Germany) Puma	
2012–2015	(Switzerland) Burrda Sport	
2016–2018	(Germany) Uhlsport	
2019–	(Italy) Kappa	

== Results and fixtures ==
The following is a list of match results in the last 12 months, as well as any future matches that have been scheduled.

Win Draw Loss Fixture

=== 2025 ===
1 December 2025 FIFA Arab Cup GS	Tunisia	0–1	Syria	Al Rayyan, Qatar
16:00 UTC+3		Report	Khribin 48'	Stadium: Ahmad bin Ali Stadium; Attendance: 26,966; Referee: Juan Calderón (Costa Rica)

4 December 2025 FIFA Arab Cup GS	Palestine	2–2	Tunisia	Lusail, Qatar
17:30 UTC+3	Hamdan 61'; Qunbar 85'	Report	Layouni 16'; Chaouat 51'	Stadium: Lusail Stadium; Attendance: 44,548; Referee: Ismail Elfath (United States)

7 December 2025 FIFA Arab Cup GS	Qatar	0–3	Tunisia	Al Khor, Qatar
20:00 UTC+3		Report	Ben Romdhane 16'; Meriah 62'; Ben Ali 90+4'	Stadium: Al Bayt Stadium; Attendance: 48,151; Referee: Espen Eskås (Norway)

18 December Friendly	Tunisia	2–1	Botswana	Tabarka, Tunisia
15:00 UTC+1	Sliti 85', 90+4' (pen.)	Report	Orebonye 50'	Stadium: La Cigale Training Center; Attendance: 0 (Behind closed doors); Referee: Abdelwahid Haridiwa (Libya)

23 December 2025 AFCON GS	Tunisia	3–1	Uganda	Rabat, Morocco
21:00 UTC+1	Skhiri 10'; Achouri 40', 64'	Report	Omedi 90+2'	Stadium: Rabat Olympic Stadium; Attendance: 13,387; Referee: Patrice Mebiame (Gabon)

27 December 2025 AFCON GS	Nigeria	3–2	Tunisia	Fez, Morocco
21:00 UTC+1	Osimhen 44'; Ndidi 50'; Lookman 67'	Report	Talbi 74'; Abdi 87' (pen.)	Stadium: Fez Stadium; Attendance: 25,544; Referee: Boubou Traore (Mali)

30 December 2025 AFCON GS	Tanzania	1–1	Tunisia	Rabat, Morocco
17:00 UTC+1	Salum 48'	Report	Gharbi 43' (pen.)	Stadium: Rabat Olympic Stadium; Attendance: 15,205; Referee: Jean-Jacques Ndala (DR Congo)

=== 2026 ===
3 January 2025 AFCON R16	Mali	1–1 (a.e.t.) (3–2 p)	Tunisia	Casablanca, Morocco
20:00 UTC+1	Sinayoko 90+6' (pen.)	Report	Chaouat 88'	Stadium: Mohammed V Stadium; Attendance: 41,982; Referee: Abongile Tom (South Africa)
	Penalties
	Bissouma (penalty missed); Sinayoko (penalty scored); Dorgeles (penalty missed); Diakité (penalty scored); Touré (penalty scored)		(penalty scored) Meriah; (penalty missed) Abdi; (penalty scored) Saad; (penalty missed) Achouri; (penalty missed) Ben Romdhane

28 March Friendly	Haiti	0–1	Tunisia	Toronto, Canada
20:00 UTC−4		Report	Tounekti 7'	Stadium: BMO Field; Attendance: 13,408; Referee: Pierre-Luc Lauzière (Canada)

31 March Friendly	Canada	0–0	Tunisia	Toronto, Canada
21:00 UTC−4 (Note: The Canada v Tunisia match, originally to be played at 19:30 UTC−4, was delayed by 90 minutes due to bad weather.)		Report		Stadium: BMO Field; Attendance: 22,624; Referee: Keylor Herrera (Costa Rica)

1 June Friendly	Austria	1–0	Tunisia	Vienna, Austria
20:45 UTC+2	Sabitzer 63'	Report		Stadium: Ernst-Happel-Stadion; Attendance: 35,100; Referee: Jérémie Pignard (France)

6 June Friendly	Belgium	5–0	Tunisia	Brussels, Belgium
15:00 UTC+2	Trossard 28'; De Ketelaere 53'; De Bruyne 65'; Lukébakio 85'; Raskin 87'	Report		Stadium: King Baudouin Stadium; Attendance: 40,236; Referee: Anastasios Sidiropoulos (Greece)

14 June 2026 FIFA World Cup GS	Sweden	5–1	Tunisia	Guadalupe, Nuevo León, Mexico
20:00 UTC−6	Ayari 7', 90+6'; Isak 30'; Gyökeres 59'; Svanber 84'	Report	Rekik 43'	Stadium: Estadio BBVA; Attendance: 50,987; Referee: Yael Falcón (Argentina)

20 June 2026 FIFA World Cup GS	Tunisia	0–4	Japan	Guadalupe, Nuevo León, Mexico
22:00 UTC−6		Report	Kamada 4'; Ueda 31', 83'; J. Itō 69'	Stadium: Estadio BBVA; Attendance: 51,243; Referee: István Kovács (Romania)

25 June 2026 FIFA World Cup GS	Tunisia	1–3	Netherlands	Kansas City, Missouri, United States
18:00 UTC−5	Mastouri 54'	Report	Skhiri 3' (o.g.); Brobbey 7'; van Hecke 62'	Stadium: Arrowhead Stadium; Attendance: 68,391; Referee: Katia Itzel García (Mexico)

24 September 2027 AFCON qualification	Tunisia	1–1	Uganda	Tunis, Tunisia
20:00 UTC+1	Arous 12'	Report	Mato 68'	Stadium: Hammadi Agrebi Stadium; Referee: Abdelaziz Bouh (Mauritania)

29 September 2027 AFCON qualification	Tunisia	2–2	Botswana	Tunis, Tunisia
20:00 UTC+1	Mastouri 44', 49'	Report	Kgamanyane 38'; Ditsele 60'	Stadium: Hammadi Agrebi Stadium; Referee: Ahmed Arajiga (Tanzania)

3 October Friendly	Tunisia	Cancelled	Mali	Tunis, Tunisia
20:00 UTC+1				Stadium: Hammadi Agrebi Stadium

13 November 2027 AFCON qualification	Tunisia	0–2	Libya	Sfax, Tunisia
17:00 UTC+1		Report	Youssef 14' (pen.); Elhouni 62'	Stadium: Taieb Mhiri Stadium; Referee: Hamza El Fariq (Morocco)

17 November 2027 AFCON qualification	Libya	1–1	Tunisia	Tripoli, Libya
18:00 UTC+2	El Maremi 45+5'	Report	Ben Slimane 3'	Stadium: Tripoli Stadium; Attendance: 0 (Behind closed doors); Referee: Raphiou Ligali (Benin)

=== 2027 ===
24 March 2027 AFCON qualification	Uganda	v	Tunisia	TBD, Uganda
TBD				Stadium: TBD

28 March 2027 AFCON qualification	Botswana	v	Tunisia	TBD, Botswana
TBD				Stadium: TBD

== Coaching staff ==
Position	Name
Head coach	(Tunisia) Mouin Chaâbani
Assistant coach	(Tunisia) Mourad Melki (Tunisia) Seifallah Hosni
Goalkeeping coach	(Tunisia) Khaled Maghzaoui
Fitness coach	(Tunisia) Hatem Boulila
Performance analyst	(Tunisia) Wessam Safwat
Team doctor	(Tunisia) Faycel Khachnaoui

== Players ==
=== Current squad ===
The following players were called up for the 2027 Africa Cup of Nations qualification matches against Libya on 13 and 17 November 2026; respectively.

Caps and goals correct as of 17 November 2026, after the match against the Libya.

No.	Pos.	Player	Date of birth (age)	Caps	Goals	Club
1	GK	Mouhib Chamakh	25 August 2001 (age 25)	4	0	(Tunisian Football Federation) Club Africain
16	GK	Aymen Dahmen	28 January 1997 (age 29)	43	0	(Tunisian Football Federation) Sfaxien
26	GK	Bechir Ben Saïd	29 November 1992 (age 33)	22	0	(Tunisian Football Federation) Esperance de Tunis
2	DF	Mohamed Amine Ben Hamida	15 December 1995 (age 30)	17	0	(Saudi Arabian Football Federation) Al-Hazem
3	DF	Montassar Talbi	26 May 1998 (age 28)	71	4	(French Football Federation) Lorient
4	DF	Omar Rekik	20 December 2001 (age 24)	9	1	(Bulgarian Football Union) Ludogorets Razgrad
6	DF	Adem Arous	17 July 2004 (age 22)	4	1	(Turkish Football Federation) Kasımpaşa
12	DF	Ali Maâloul	1 January 1990 (age 36)	98	3	(Tunisian Football Federation) Sfaxien
18	DF	Alaa Ghram	24 July 2001 (age 25)	9	0	(Ukrainian Association of Football) Shakhtar Donetsk
20	DF	Mohamed Dräger	25 June 1996 (age 30)	40	3	(Tunisian Football Federation) Esperance de Tunis
21	DF	Ghaith Zaalouni	6 May 2002 (age 24)	2	0	(Tunisian Football Federation) Club Africain
24	DF	Mohamed Nasraoui	18 August 2002 (age 24)	1	0	(Croatian Football Federation) Istra 1961
5	MF	Mohamed Ali Ben Romdhane	6 September 1999 (age 27)	63	7	(Qatar Football Association) Al-Shamal
10	MF	Anis Ben Slimane	16 March 2001 (age 25)	48	5	(The Football Association) Norwich City
13	MF	Ferjani Sassi	18 March 1992 (age 34)	105	9	(Qatar Football Association) Al-Gharafa
14	MF	Aïssa Laïdouni	13 December 1996 (age 29)	62	2	(Qatar Football Association) Al-Wakrah
15	MF	Hadj Mahmoud	24 April 2000 (age 26)	12	0	(Tunisian Football Federation) Esperance de Tunis
17	MF	Samy Chouchane	5 July 2003 (age 23)	1	0	(French Football Federation) Dijon
27	MF	Moataz Zemzemi	7 August 1999 (age 27)	2	0	(Bulgarian Football Union) CSKA 1948
7	FW	Khalil Ayari	2 February 2005 (age 21)	6	0	(French Football Federation) Dunkerque
8	FW	Elias Saad	27 December 1999 (age 26)	19	4	(United States Soccer Federation) Nashville SC
9	FW	Sadok Kadida	6 December 2003 (age 22)	2	0	(Tunisian Football Federation) Club Africain
11	MF	Ismaël Gharbi	10 April 2004 (age 22)	23	2	(Royal Spanish Football Federation) Leganés
19	FW	Firas Chaouat	8 May 1996 (age 30)	35	6	(Libyan Football Federation) Al Ahly SC
23	FW	Sayfallah Ltaief	22 April 2000 (age 26)	26	1	(Polish Football Association) Cracovia
25	FW	Mohamed Ali Ben Hammouda	24 July 1998 (age 28)	2	0	(Algerian Football Federation) CR Belouizdad
26	FW	Raki Aouani	11 September 2004 (age 22)	0	0	(Latvian Football Federation) Riga FC

=== Recent call-ups ===
The following players have been called up within the last twelve months.

Pos.	Player	Date of birth (age)	Caps	Goals	Club	Latest call-up
GK	Noureddine Farhati	14 September 2000 (age 26)	1	0	(Tunisia) Stade Tunisien	v. Canada, 31 March 2026
GK	Bechir Ben Saïd	29 November 1994 (age 31)	22	0	(Tunisia) Espérance de Tunis	2025 Africa Cup of Nations
DF	Dylan Bronn	19 June 1995 (age 31)	53	2	(Switzerland) Servette	2026 FIFA World Cup
DF	Ali Abdi	20 December 1993 (age 32)	49	7	(France) Nice	2026 FIFA World Cup
DF	Mortadha Ben Ouanes	2 July 1994 (age 32)	19	0	(Turkey) Kasımpaşa	2026 FIFA World Cup
DF	Omar Rekik	20 December 2001 (age 24)	8	1	(Slovenia) Maribor	2026 FIFA World Cup
DF	Raed Chikhaoui	9 June 2004 (age 22)	0	0	(Tunisia) Espérance de Tunis	2026 FIFA World Cup
DF	Ghaith Zaalouni	6 May 2002 (age 24)	1	0	(Tunisia) Club Africain	v. Canada, 31 March 2026
DF	Yassine Meriah	2 July 1993 (age 33)	95	6	(Tunisia) Club Africain	2025 Africa Cup of Nations
DF	Nader Ghandri	18 February 1995 (age 31)	20	0	(Libya) Asswehly	2025 Africa Cup of Nations
DF	Mohamed Ben Ali	16 February 1995 (age 31)	5	1	(Tunisia) Espérance de Tunis	2025 Africa Cup of Nations
DF	Oussama Haddadi	28 January 1992 (age 34)	36	0	(Morocco) RS Berkane	2025 FIFA Arab Cup
DF	Hamza Jelassi	29 September 1991 (age 35)	7	0	(Tunisia) Espérance de Tunis	2025 FIFA Arab Cup
DF	Marouane Sahraoui	9 January 1996 (age 30)	1	0	(Tunisia) Espérance de Tunis	2025 FIFA Arab Cup
MF	Ellyes Skhiri (captain)	10 May 1995 (age 31)	86	4	(Germany) Eintracht Frankfurt	2026 FIFA World Cup
MF	Hannibal Mejbri	21 January 2003 (age 23)	48	1	(England) Burnley	2026 FIFA World Cup
MF	Mohamed Belhadj Mahmoud	24 April 2000 (age 26)	11	0	(Tunisia) Espérance de Tunis	2026 FIFA World Cup
MF	Rani Khedira	27 January 1994 (age 32)	6	0	(Germany) Union Berlin	2026 FIFA World Cup
MF	Houssem Tka	16 August 2000 (age 26)	4	0	(Algeria) CR Belouizdad	2025 Africa Cup of Nations
MF	Chiheb Jebali	26 May 1996 (age 30)	3	0	(Tunisia) Espérance de Tunis	2025 FIFA Arab Cup
FW	Firas Chaouat	8 May 1996 (age 30)	33	6	(Tunisia) Club Africain	2026 FIFA World Cup
FW	Elias Saad	27 December 1999 (age 26)	17	4	(United States) Nashville SC	2026 FIFA World Cup
FW	Louey Ben Farhat	19 July 2006 (age 20)	2	0	(Germany) Karlsruher SC	v. Canada, 31 March 2026
FW	Omar Ben Ali	22 April 2005 (age 21)	0	0	(Turkey) Alanyaspor	v. Canada, 31 March 2026
FW	Anisse Saidi	20 June 2008 (age 18)	0	0	(Portugal) Benfica	v. Canada, 31 March 2026
FW	Naïm Sliti	27 July 1992 (age 34)	85	16	Unattached	2025 Africa Cup of Nations^{RET}
FW	Seifeddine Jaziri	11 February 1993 (age 33)	44	11	(Egypt) Zamalek	2025 Africa Cup of Nations
FW	Amor Layouni	3 October 1992 (age 34)	16	2	(Sweden) Häcken	2025 FIFA Arab Cup
FW	Rayane Anane	15 August 2006 (age 20)	1	0	(Tunisia) Étoile du Sahel	2025 FIFA Arab Cup
FW	Nacim Dendani	30 April 2006 (age 20)	0	0	(France) Monaco (Note: Monaco is a Monégasque club playing in the French football league system.)	2025 FIFA Arab Cup
Notes: ^{INJ} Player withdrew from the squad due to an injury.; ^{PRE} Preliminary squad.; ^{RET} Player has retired from international football.; ^{SUS} Player is serving a suspension.; ^{WD} Player withdrew for personal reasons.

== Player records ==
As of 17 November 2026
Players in bold are still active with Tunisia. Includes only statistics recognized by FIFA.

=== Most appearances ===
Rank	Player	Caps	Goals	Career
1	Radhi Jaïdi	105	7	1996–2009
1	**Ferjani Sassi**	105	9	2013–present
3	Youssef Msakni	104	23	2010–2024
4	**Ali Maâloul**	98	3	2013–present
5	Chokri El Ouaer	97	0	1990–2002
6	Khaled Badra	96	10	1995–2006
7	Khaled Ben Yahia	95	5	1979–1993
7	Kaies Ghodhbane	95	6	1995–2006
7	Yassine Meriah	95	6	2015–2026
10	Riadh Bouazizi	92	4	1995–2006

=== Top goalscorers ===
Rank	Player	Goals	Caps	Ratio	Career
1	Issam Jemâa (list)	36	84	0.43	2005–2014
2	Wahbi Khazri	25	74	0.34	2013–2022
3	Youssef Msakni	23	104	0.22	2010–2024
4	Francileudo Santos	22	41	0.54	2004–2008
5	Adel Sellimi	20	80	0.25	1991–2002
6	Faouzi Rouissi	18	57	0.32	1989–2001
7	Zoubeir Baya	17	83	0.2	1994–2002
7	Mohamed Ali Mahjoubi	17	86	0.2	1985–1995
9	Mohamed Akid	16	50	0.32	1967–1978
9	Naïm Sliti	16	85	0.19	2016–2026

== Competitive record ==
=== FIFA World Cup ===
FIFA World Cup record										FIFA World Cup qualification record						
Year	Round	Position	Pld	W	D*	L	GF	GA	Squad	Pld	W	D	L	GF	GA	Ref.
(Uruguay) 1930	Not affiliated									Not affiliated						
(Italy) 1934	Not affiliated									Not affiliated						
(France) 1938	Not affiliated									Not affiliated						
(Brazil) 1950	Not affiliated									Not affiliated						
(Switzerland) 1954	Not affiliated									Not affiliated						
(Sweden) 1958	Not a FIFA member									Not a FIFA member						
(Chile) 1962	Did not qualify									3	1	1	1	4	4	
(England) 1966	Withdrew									Withdrew						
(Mexico) 1970	Did not qualify									5	1	4	0	4	3	
(West Germany) 1974	Did not qualify									4	1	1	2	5	5	
(Argentina) 1978	Group stage	9th	3	1	1	1	3	2	Squad	10	4	4	2	15	9	
(Spain) 1982	Did not qualify									2	1	0	1	2	2	
(Mexico) 1986	Did not qualify									8	4	0	4	11	9	
(Italy) 1990	Did not qualify									10	4	1	5	10	11	
(United States) 1994	Did not qualify									6	3	3	0	14	2	
(France) 1998	Group stage	26th	3	0	1	2	1	4	Squad	8	7	1	0	15	2	
(South Korea) (Japan) 2002	Group stage	29th	3	0	1	2	1	5	Squad	10	8	2	0	28	5	
(Germany) 2006	Group stage	24th	3	0	1	2	3	6	Squad	10	6	3	1	25	9	
(South Africa) 2010	Did not qualify									12	7	3	2	18	7	
(Brazil) 2014	Did not qualify									8	4	3	1	14	10	
(Russia) 2018	Group stage	24th	3	1	0	2	5	8	Squad	8	6	2	0	15	6	
(Qatar) 2022	Group stage	21st	3	1	1	1	1	1	Squad	8	5	2	1	12	2	
(Canada) (Mexico) (United States) 2026	Group stage	47th	3	0	0	3	2	12	Squad	10	9	1	0	22	0	
(Morocco) (Portugal) (Spain) 2030	To be determined									To be determined						
(Saudi Arabia) 2034	To be determined									To be determined						
Total: 7/17	Group stage	7/22	21	3	5	13	16	38	—	122	71	31	20	214	86	—

=== Africa Cup of Nations ===
Africa Cup of Nations record										Africa Cup of Nations qualification record						
Year	Round	Position	Pld	W	D*	L	GF	GA	Squad	Pld	W	D	L	GF	GA	Ref.
(Sudan) 1957	Not affiliated to CAF									Not affiliated to CAF						
(United Arab Republic) 1959	Not affiliated to CAF									Not affiliated to CAF						
(Ethiopia) 1962	Third place	3rd	2	1	0	1	5	4	Squad	4	3	0	1	7	2	
(Ghana) 1963	Group stage	5th	2	0	1	1	3	5	Squad	2	1	0	1	6	5	
(Tunisia) 1965	Runners-up	2nd	3	1	1	1	6	3	Squad	Qualified as hosts						
(Ethiopia) 1968	Did not qualify									4	1	1	2	5	5	
(Sudan) 1970	Did not enter									Did not enter						
(Cameroon) 1972	Did not enter									Did not enter						
(Egypt) 1974	Did not enter									Did not enter						
(Ethiopia) 1976	Did not qualify									6	3	1	2	8	7	
(Ghana) 1978	Fourth place (Note: On 16 March 1978, the third place match of the 1978 African Cup of Nations between Nigeria and Tunisia at the Accra Sports Stadium in Accra, Ghana was abandoned after Tunisia's players walked off at the 42nd minute with the score tied at 1–1 to protest the officiating. The Confederation of African Football awarded a 2–0 win to Nigeria and Tunisia suspended for two years and banned them from the next tournament.)	4th	5	1	2	2	4	5	Squad	4	2	1	1	10	7	
(Nigeria) 1980	Banned									Banned						
(Libya) 1982	Group stage	7th	3	0	1	2	1	4	Squad	2	1	1	0	1	0	
(Ivory Coast) 1984	Did not qualify									4	2	1	1	6	1	
(Egypt) 1986	Did not qualify									2	1	0	1	1	2	
(Morocco) 1988	Did not qualify									2	0	1	1	1	2	
(Algeria) 1990	Did not qualify									2	0	0	2	0	4	
(Senegal) 1992	Did not qualify									6	3	3	0	10	5	
(Tunisia) 1994	Group stage	9th	2	0	1	1	1	3	Squad	Qualified as hosts						
(South Africa) 1996	Runners-up	2nd	6	2	2	2	10	9	Squad	8	3	4	1	7	2	
(Burkina Faso) 1998	Quarter-finals	7th	4	2	1	1	6	5	Squad	3	2	0	1	3	1	
(Ghana) (Nigeria) 2000	Fourth place	4th	6	2	2	2	6	9	Squad	6	5	0	1	13	3	
(Mali) 2002	Group stage	11th	3	0	2	1	0	1	Squad	6	2	2	2	9	7	
(Tunisia) 2004	Champions	1st	6	4	2	0	10	4	Squad	Qualified as hosts						
(Egypt) 2006	Quarter-finals	6th	4	2	1	1	7	5	Squad	10	6	3	1	25	9	
(Ghana) 2008	Quarter-finals	5th	4	1	2	1	7	6	Squad	6	4	1	1	12	3	
(Angola) 2010	Group stage	12th	3	0	3	0	3	3	Squad	12	7	3	2	18	7	
(Equatorial Guinea) (Gabon) 2012	Quarter-finals	6th	4	2	0	2	5	5	Squad	8	4	2	2	14	6	
(South Africa) 2013	Group stage	12th	3	1	1	1	2	4	Squad	2	0	2	0	2	2	
(Equatorial Guinea) 2015	Quarter-finals	7th	4	1	2	1	5	5	Squad	6	4	2	0	6	2	
(Gabon) 2017	Quarter-finals	8th	4	2	0	2	6	7	Squad	6	4	1	1	16	3	
(Egypt) 2019	Fourth place	4th	7	1	4	2	6	5	Squad	6	5	0	1	12	4	
(Cameroon) 2021	Quarter-finals	8th	5	2	0	3	5	3	Squad	6	5	1	0	14	5	
(Ivory Coast) 2023	Group stage	20th	3	0	2	1	1	2	Squad	6	4	1	1	11	1	
(Morocco) 2025	Round of 16	12th	4	1	2	1	7	6	Squad	6	3	1	2	7	6	
(Kenya) (Tanzania) (Uganda) 2027	To be determined									To be determined						
2028	To be determined									To be determined						
Total	Champions	22/35	87	26	32	29	106	103	—	135	75	32	28	224	101	—

=== African Nations Championship ===
African Nations Championship record										African Nations Championship qualification record						
Year	Round	Position	Pld	W	D*	L	GF	GA	Squad	Pld	W	D	L	GF	GA	Ref.
(Ivory Coast) 2009	Did not qualify									2	0	2	0	2	2	
(Sudan) 2011	Champions	1st	6	4	2	0	11	3	Squad	2	0	2	0	3	3	
(South Africa) 2014	Did not qualify									2	0	1	1	0	1	
(Rwanda) 2016	Quarter-finals	8th	4	1	2	1	9	5	Squad	4	1	1	2	4	5	
(Morocco) 2018	Did not enter									Did not enter						
(Cameroon) 2020	Withdrew after qualifying (Note: Tunisia qualified against Libya after winning two matches in the qualifiers, back 1–0 and 1–2, and due to the delay in the start of the session from January to April, the candidacy was withdrawn from the Tunisian Football Federation on 20 December 2019 due to the pressure of the calendar after consulting with the Tunisian Ligue Professionnelle 1 clubs.)									2	2	0	0	3	1	
(Algeria) 2022	Did not enter									Did not enter						
(Kenya) (Tanzania) (Uganda) 2024	Withdrew after qualifying (Note: After the team was automatically qualified by the Confederation of African Football on 9 October 2024, the Tunisian Football Federation withdrew from the finals on 28 November due to the pressure of the calendar after consulting with the Tunisian Ligue Professionnelle 1 clubs.)									Qualified automatically (Note: The Confederation of African Football has allocated three places for the North African region, however Algeria and Egypt have declined to participate. On 9 October 2024, during the draw for the 2024 African Nations Championship qualification, it was decided that Libya, Morocco and Tunisia would automatically qualify for the final tournament.)						
Total	Champions	2/8	10	5	4	1	20	8	—	12	3	6	3	12	12	—

=== FIFA Arab Cup ===
FIFA Arab Cup record										FIFA Arab Cup qualification record						
Year	Round	Position	Pld	W	D*	L	GF	GA	Squad	Pld	W	D	L	GF	GA	Ref.
(Lebanon) 1963	Champions	1st	4	4	0	0	11	1	Squad	Qualified automatically						
(Kuwait) 1964	Did not enter									Did not enter						
(Iraq) 1966	Did not enter									Did not enter						
(Saudi Arabia) 1985	Did not enter									Did not enter						
(Jordan) 1988	Group stage	7th	4	0	3	1	3	4	Squad	2	1	1	0	2	1	
(Syria) 1992	Did not enter									Did not enter						
(Qatar) 1998	Did not enter									Did not enter						
(Kuwait) 2002	Did not enter									Did not enter						
(Saudi Arabia) 2012	Did not enter									Did not enter						
(Qatar) 2021	Runners-up	2nd	6	4	0	2	9	6	Squad	Qualified automatically						
(Qatar) 2025	Group stage	9th	3	1	1	1	5	3	Squad	Qualified automatically						
Total	Champions	4/11	17	9	4	4	28	14	—	2	1	1	0	2	1	—

=== Summer Olympics ===
Summer Olympics record										Summer Olympics qualification record						
Year	Round	Position	Pld	W	D*	L	GF	GA	Squad	Pld	W	D	L	GF	GA	Ref.
(Greece) 1896 to (Finland) 1952	Not affiliated									Not affiliated						
(Australia) 1956	Did not enter									Did not enter						
(Italy) 1960	Group stage	15th	3	0	0	3	3	11	Squad	8	3	2	3	8	7	
(Japan) 1964	Did not qualify									5	1	3	1	6	7	
(Mexico) 1968	Did not qualify									2	0	2	0	1	1	
(West Germany) 1972	Did not qualify									6	2	2	2	10	7	
(Canada) 1976	Did not qualify									4	1	1	2	3	4	
(Soviet Union) 1980	Did not qualify									2	1	0	1	1	3	
(United States) 1984	Did not qualify									2	1	1	0	4	1	
(South Korea) 1988	Group stage	13th	3	0	2	1	3	6	Squad	6	3	2	1	6	3	
Since (Spain) 1992	See Tunisia national under-23 football team									See Tunisia national under-23 football team						
Total	Group stage	2/15	6	0	2	4	6	17	—	35	12	13	10	39	33	—

=== FIFA Confederations Cup ===
FIFA Confederations Cup record
Year	Round	Position	Pld	W	D*	L	GF	GA	Squad	Ref
(Saudi Arabia) 1992	Did not qualify									
(Saudi Arabia) 1995	Did not qualify									
(Saudi Arabia) 1997	Did not qualify									
(Mexico) 1999	Did not qualify									
(South Korea) (Japan) 2001	Did not qualify									
(France) 2003	Did not qualify									
(Germany) 2005	Group stage	6th	3	1	0	2	3	5	Squad	
(South Africa) 2009	Did not qualify									
(Brazil) 2013	Did not qualify									
(Russia) 2017	Did not qualify									
Total	Group stage	1/10	3	1	0	2	3	5	—	—

=== Mediterranean Games ===
Mediterranean Games record
Year	Round	Position	Pld	W	D*	L	GF	GA	Squad	Ref
(Egypt) 1951	Not affiliated									
(Spain) 1955	Did not enter									
(Lebanon) 1959	Did not enter									
(Italy) 1963	Group stage	6th	3	1	0	2	3	4	Squad	
(Tunisia) 1967	Group stage	5th	3	1	1	1	4	3	Squad	
(Turkey) 1971	Runners-up	2nd	4	2	1	1	3	2	Squad	
(Algeria) 1975	Third place	3rd	5	1	3	1	5	5	Squad	
(Socialist Federal Republic of Yugoslavia) 1979	Group stage	7th	3	0	1	2	2	4	Squad	
(Morocco) 1983	Group stage	7th	2	1	0	1	4	5	Squad	
(Syria) 1987	Did not enter									
Since 1991	See Tunisia national under-23 football team and Tunisia national under-20 football team									
Total	Runners-up	6/10	20	6	6	8	21	23	—	—

=== African Games ===
African Games record
Year	Round	Position	Pld	W	D*	L	GF	GA	Squad	Ref
(Republic of the Congo) 1965	Did not qualify									
(Nigeria) 1973	Withdrew									
(Algeria) 1978	Withdrew after qualifying									
(Kenya) 1987	Group stage	8	4	0	0	4	1	8	Squad	
Since 1991	See Tunisia national under-23 football team									
Total	Group stage	1/4	4	0	0	4	1	8	—	—

=== Arab Games ===
Arab Games record
Year	Round	Position	Pld	W	D*	L	GF	GA	Squad	Ref
(Egypt) 1953	Did not enter									
(Lebanon) 1957	Runners-up	2nd	5	3	0	2	14	13	Squad	
(Morocco) 1961	Did not enter									
(United Arab Republic) 1965	Did not enter									
(Syria) 1976	Did not enter									
(Morocco) 1985	Group stage	5th	3	2	1	0	7	2	Squad	
(Lebanon) 1997	Did not enter									
(Jordan) 1999	Did not enter									
(Egypt) 2007	Did not enter									
(Qatar) 2011	Did not enter									
Since 2023	See Tunisia national under-23 football team									
Total	Runners-up	2/10	8	5	1	2	21	15	—	—

=== Minor tournaments ===
Other tournaments records
Year	Round	Position	Pld	W	D*	L	GF	GA	Ref
(Libya) 1962 Tripoli Fair Tournament	Third place	3rd	3	1	0	2	6	9	—
(Senegal) 1963 Friendship Games	Runners-up	2nd	6	4	1	0	4	9	
(Libya) 1965 Tripoli Fair Tournament	Champions	1st	3	2	1	0	4	2	
(Libya) 1966 Tripoli Fair Tournament	Fourth place	4th	3	0	1	2	0	3	
(Libya) 1973 Palestine Cup of Nations	Champions	1st	6	6	0	0	19	3	
1974 Iran International Tournament	Group stage	6th	2	0	1	1	0	2	
(United Arab Republic) 1974 Kuneitra Cup	Third place	3rd	7	4	0	3	10	9	
(Tunisia) 1975 Palestine Cup of Nations	Group stage	5th	2	1	1	0	4	1	
(Ivory Coast) 1984–85 Friendship Games	Third place	3rd	2	1	0	2	2	6	
1988 Malta International Tournament	Fourth place	4th	3	0	0	3	1	10	
(Tunisia) 7th November Cup 1991	Champions	1st	2	2	0	0	11	3	
(Tunisia) 7th November Cup 1993	Champions	1st	2	2	0	0	6	1	
1994 Malta International Tournament	Third place	3rd	3	0	2	1	2	5	
(Tunisia) 7th November Cup 1995	Champions	1st	2	2	0	0	4	1	
(Tunisia) 1997 LG Cup	Champions	1st	2	2	0	0	5	1	
(Tunisia) 2003 Tunis Four Nations Tournament	Champions	1st	2	1	1	0	3	2	
(Tunisia) 2006 LG Cup	Runners-up	2nd	2	1	1	0	3	0	
(Spain) 2011 Catalonia International Trophy	Champions	1st	1	0	1	0	0	0	
(Japan) 2015 Kirin Challenge Cup	Runners-up	2nd	1	0	0	1	0	2	
(Spain) 2016 Catalonia International Trophy	Champions	1st	1	0	1	0	3	3	
(Japan) 2022 Kirin Cup Soccer	Champions	1st	2	2	0	0	5	0	
(Japan) 2023 Kirin Challenge Cup	Runners-up	2nd	1	0	0	1	0	2	
(Egypt) 2024 ACUD Cup	Third place	3rd	2	0	2	0	0	0	
Total	10 Titles	1st	60	31	13	16	92	74	—

== Head-to-head record ==
The list shown below shows the Tunisia national football team all−time international record against opposing nations.

Key

Positive balance (more wins than losses)
Neutral balance (as many wins as losses)
Negative balance (more losses than wins)

Tunisia national football team head-to-head records
Against	Pld	W	D	L	GF	GA	GD	Confederation
Algeria	48	14	16	18	40	50	−10	CAF
Angola	7	3	4	0	15	5	+10	CAF
Argentina	1	0	0	1	1	2	−1	CONMEBOL
Australia	3	1	0	2	2	4	−2	AFC
Austria	4	0	1	3	2	6	−4	UEFA
Bahrain	2	1	0	1	3	1	+2	AFC
Belarus	1	1	0	0	3	0	+3	UEFA
Belgium	5	1	1	3	5	13	−8	UEFA
Benin	9	6	3	0	24	6	+18	CAF
Bosnia and Herzegovina	1	1	0	0	2	1	+1	UEFA
Botswana	10	5	3	2	16	8	+8	CAF
Brazil	3	0	1	2	3	10	−7	CONMEBOL
Bulgaria	2	1	1	0	6	3	+3	UEFA
Burkina Faso	8	2	3	3	9	8	+1	CAF
Burundi	3	3	0	0	5	2	+3	CAF
Cameroon	18	2	7	9	18	29	−11	CAF
Canada	2	1	1	0	2	0	+2	CONCACAF
Cape Verde	4	3 (Note: FIFA awarded Tunisia a 3–0 win as a result of Cape Verde fielding the player Fernando Varela, who had been sent off in the match against Equatorial Guinea on 24 March 2013. As a result of his sending off for unsporting conduct towards a match official, Varela had been given a four match suspension and would miss the rest of the qualifying campaign plus one further FIFA game. Varela did not participate in the games against Equatorial Guinea on 8 June 2013 or the game against Sierra Leone on 16 June 2013. Complicating matters, Varela's red card against Equatorial Guinea was removed from the FIFA.com website. The match originally ended 2–0 to Cape Verde.)	1	0	7	2	+5	CAF
Central African Republic	1	1	0	0	3	0	+3	CAF
Chad	4	3	1	0	10	2	+8	CAF
Chile	2	1	0	1	4	3	+1	CONMEBOL
China	4	1	2	1	3	3	0	AFC
Chinese Taipei	1	1	0	0	8	1	+7	AFC
Comoros	3	1	1	1	2	2	0	CAF
Colombia	2	0	1	1	1	2	−1	CONMEBOL
Congo	9	6	2	1	17	6	+11	CAF
Costa Rica	1	1	0	0	1	0	+1	CONCACAF
Croatia	2	1	1	0	2	1	+1	UEFA
Denmark	3	0	1	2	2	5	−3	UEFA
Djibouti	2	2	0	0	11	1	+10	CAF
DR Congo (Note: Includes matches against Zaire)	14	7	4	3	25	13	+12	CAF
East Germany	5	1	0	4	1	11	−10	UEFA
Egypt	41	18	10	13	47	38	+9	CAF
England	3	0	1	2	2	5	−3	UEFA
Equatorial Guinea	11	7	1	3	17	7	+10	CAF
Ethiopia	8	4	2	2	17	11	+6	CAF
Finland	3	0	1	2	2	6	−4	UEFA
France	5	1	2	2	4	7	−3	UEFA
Gabon	11	4	6	1	21	12	+9	CAF
Gambia	4	1	0	3	3	5	−2	CAF
Georgia	2	0	1	1	1	3	−2	UEFA
Germany (Note: Includes matches against West Germany.)	3	0	2	1	1	4	−3	UEFA
Ghana	18 (Note: The two teams play on January 18, 2000 a training match, three halves of 35 minutes, won by Ghana 2–0 but which can not be considered a real international match.)	4	5	9	20	27	−7	CAF
Guinea	20	9	4	7	31	19	+12	CAF
Guinea-Bissau	1	1	0	0	3	1	+2	CAF
Haiti	1	1	0	0	1	0	+1	CONCACAF
Hungary	4	0	1	3	3	16	−13	UEFA
Iceland	1	1	0	0	3	1	+2	UEFA
India	1	0	1	0	2	2	0	AFC
Iran	3	2	1	0	5	2	+3	AFC
Iraq	11	7	3	1	19	10	+9	AFC
Republic of Ireland	1	0	0	1	0	4	−4	UEFA
Italy	1	0	0	1	0	4	−4	UEFA
Ivory Coast	19	6	6	7	27	29	−2	CAF
Japan	7	1	0	6	3	12	−9	AFC
Jordan	4	3	1	0	15	5	+10	AFC
Kenya	7	5	1	1	10	3	+7	CAF
Kuwait	4	3	0	1	8	4	+4	AFC
Latvia	1	1	0	0	3	0	+3	UEFA
Lebanon	5	3	1	1	9	5	+4	AFC
Liberia	12	7	2	3	21	9	+12	CAF
Libya	31	19	4	8	55	36	+19	CAF
Madagascar	7	6	0	1	12	6	+6	CAF
Malawi	9	4	3	2	19	8	+11	CAF
Mali	16	7	4	5	16	12	+4	CAF
Malta	12	4	4	4	13	9	+4	UEFA
Mauritania	17	11	6	0	30	6	+24	CAF
Mauritius	2	1	1	0	2	0	+2	CAF
Mexico	1	1	0	0	3	1	+2	CONCACAF
Morocco	51	9	28	14	46	55	−9	CAF
Mozambique	3	1	1	1	3	2	+1	CAF
Namibia	6	4	1	1	11	2	+9	CAF
Netherlands	4	0	2	2	4	10	−6	UEFA
New Zealand	1	0	1	0	0	0	0	OFC
Niger	4	4	0	0	9	4	+5	CAF
Nigeria	21	7	7	7	27	22	+5	CAF
Norway	2	0	1	1	1	3	−2	UEFA
Oman	3	1	1	1	3	3	0	AFC
Palestine	3	1	2	0	9	5	+4	AFC
Panama	1	1	0	0	2	1	+1	CONCACAF
Peru	1	0	1	0	1	1	0	CONMEBOL
Poland	4	1	0	3	2	9	−7	UEFA
Portugal	2	0	2	0	3	3	0	UEFA
Qatar	4	2	0	2	8	3	+5	AFC
Romania	1	0	1	0	1	1	0	UEFA
Russia (Note: Includes matches against the Soviet Union.)	2	0	0	2	0	5	−5	UEFA
Rwanda	6	6	0	0	18	3	+15	CAF
São Tomé and Príncipe	2	2	0	0	10	0	+10	CAF
Saudi Arabia	7	3	2	2	7	6	+1	AFC
Senegal	21	9	7	5	22	13	+9	CAF
Serbia (Note: Includes matches against Yugoslavia and Serbia and Montenegro)	6	1	0	5	3	22	−19	UEFA
Seychelles	4	4	0	0	14	0	+14	CAF
Sierra Leone	7	3	3	1	10	6	+4	CAF
Slovenia	2	0	1	1	2	3	−1	UEFA
Somalia	1	1	0	0	2	1	+1	CAF
South Africa	7	3	2	2	9	7	+2	CAF
South Korea	3	1	1	1	1	4	−3	AFC
Spain	2	0	0	2	1	4	−3	UEFA
Sudan	11	8	0	3	28	11	+17	CAF
Sweden	5	1	1	3	3	8	−5	UEFA
Switzerland	3	0	1	2	2	4	−2	UEFA
Eswatini	2	2	0	0	6	0	+6	CAF
Syria	12	5	1	6	16	15	+1	AFC
Tanzania	2	1	1	0	2	1	+1	CAF
Togo	10	7	3	0	19	4	+15	CAF
Turkey	6	0	5	1	4	7	−3	UEFA
Uganda	7	6	1	0	20	3	+17	CAF
Ukraine	1	0	0	1	0	1	−1	UEFA
United Arab Emirates	5	5	0	0	10	1	+9	AFC
United States	1	0	1	0	1	1	0	CONCACAF
Uruguay	1	0	1	0	0	0	0	CONMEBOL
Wales	1	1	0	0	4	0	+4	UEFA
Yemen (Note: Includes matches against North Yemen)	1	1	0	0	2	0	+2	AFC
Zambia	14	9	2	3	24	13	+11	CAF
Zimbabwe	2	1	1	0	5	3	+2	CAF
Total	754	324	211	219	1075	794	+281	—
Last match updated was against Libya on 17 November 2026

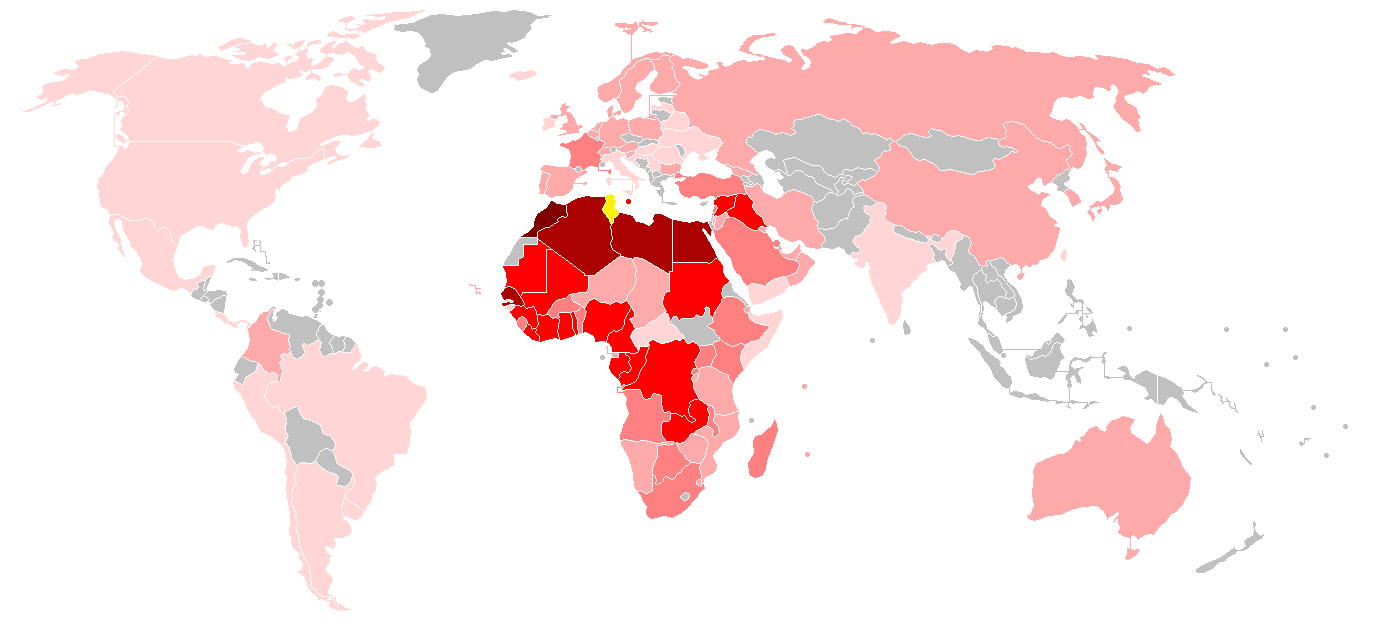
Map of teams played against Tunisia by number of matches: (Note: The map updated after the Tunisia v Tanzania match of 17 November 2020 for the Group J of the 2021 Africa Cup of Nations qualification. The matches against Germany and West Germany are combined.): 1 Match 2–4 Matches / 5–9 Matches 10–20 Matches / 20–49 Matches +50 Matches

== FIFA rankings ==
Tunisia's FIFA ranking has ranged from 65th in July 2010 to 14th in April 2018. Continentally, they were the top African team in the FIFA world rankings between July 2001 and January 2002, and between January and December 2018. They were outside the top 10 African teams between July and August 2010. Below is a graph of Tunisia's FIFA rankings since 1993.

Best Ranking Worst Ranking Best Mover Worst Mover

Tunisia's FIFA world rankings
Rank	Year	Statistics				Best		Worst	
Rank	Year	Games	Wins	Draws	Loses	Rank	Move	Rank	Move
32	1993	10	6	3	1	31	▲7 (August)	36	▼3 (September)
30	1994	10	3	5	2	27	▲4 (September)	33	▼3 (October)
22	1995	14	7	3	4	21	▲6 (February)	27	▼4 (August)
23	1996	14	7	2	5	21	▲6 (February)	31	▼9 (June)
23	1997	14	9	2	3	20	▲7 (August)	29	▼4 (June)
21	1998	17	7	4	6	19	▲6 (November)	26	▼4 (July)
31	1999	10	7	1	2	26	▲4 (November)	33	▼7 (June)
26	2000	17	8	7	2	25	▲3 (June)	28	▼1 (September)
28	2001	12	8	2	2	22	▲7 (July)	32	▼5 (April)
41	2002	14	0	8	6	28	▲0 (June)	41	▼5 (July)
45	2003	9	5	3	1	40	▲3 (April)	46	▼3 (October)
35	2004	16	8	4	4	31	▲14 (February)	45	▼2 (April)
28	2005	12	8	2	2	23	▲8 (September)	40	▼4 (October)
32	2006	16	7	4	5	21	▲5 (February)	32	▼10 (July)
47	2007	9	5	3	1	32	▲5 (July)	47	▼13 (February)
46	2008	16	7	5	4	44	▲3 (April)	56	▼7 (February)
53	2009	10	4	4	2	45	▲2 (July)	54	▼8 (February)
45	2010	11	3	5	3	44	▲11 (October)	65	▼10 (July)
59	2011	8	4	2	2	44	▲3 (March)	61	▼15 (April)
45	2012	16	8	4	4	41	▲10 (June)	59	▼4 (October)
48	2013	15	4	7	4	41	▲11 (February)	53	▼8 (June)
22	2014	9	5	3	1	22	▲11 (September)	49	▼5 (April)
40	2015	15	5	5	5	22	▲2 (June)	41	▼5 (April)
35	2016	11	6	4	1	34	▲4 (October)	48	▼8 (February)
27	2017	13	6	2	5	27	▲7 (July)	42	▼5 (April)
24	2018	8	3	2	3	14	▲9 (April)	24	▼7 (June)
27	2019	17	8	5	4	25	▲3 (June)	28	▼4 (July)
26	2020	4	2	2	0	26	▲1 (September)	27	0 (December)
30	2021	17	12	1	4	25	▲3 (December)	30	▼4 (November)
30	2022	16	8	3	5	30	▲5 (June)	36	▼6 (February)
28	2023	10	6	1	3	28	▲4 (November)	32	▼3 (October)
52	2024	15	5	7	3	36	▲5 (September)	52	▼13 (February)
41	2025	18	11	4	3	40	▲3 (April)	49	▼1 (December)

== Honours ==
Throughout its history, according to FIFA statutes the Tunisian national team has won two official senior titles, the 2004 Africa Cup of Nations and the 2011 African Nations Championship. It also won two regional competitions, the 1963 Arab Cup. organized by UAFA and the 1973 Palestine Cup of Nations. The team has also won nine friendly titles, including international friendly tournaments listed below.

=== Continental ===
- Africa Cup of Nations
  - Champions (1): 2004
  - Runners-up (2): 1965, 1996
  - Third place (1): 1962
- African Nations Championship
  - Champions (1): 2011

=== Regional ===
- Arab Cup / FIFA Arab Cup
  - (gold) Champions (1): 1963
  - (silver) Runners-up (1): 2021
- Arab Games
  - (silver) Silver Medal (1): 1957
- Palestine Cup of Nations
  - (gold) Champions (1): 1973
- Mediterranean Games
  - Silver medal (1): 1971
  - Bronze medal (1): 1975

=== Friendly ===
- Kuneitra Cup
  - (bronze) Third place (1): 1974
- 7th November Cup
  - (gold) Champions (3): 1991, 1993, 1995
- Catalonia International Trophy
  - (gold) Champions (2): 2011, 2016
- LG Cup
  - (gold) Champions (1): 1997
  - (silver) Runners-up (1): 2006
- Tripoli Fair Tournament
  - (gold) Champions (1): 1965
  - (bronze) Third place (1): 1962
- Kirin Cup Soccer
  - (gold) Champions (1) 2022
- Tunis Four Nations Tournament
  - (gold) Champions (1): 2003
- Friendship Games
  - (silver) Runners-up (1): 1963
  - (bronze) Third place (1): 1984–85
- Kirin Challenge Cup
  - (silver) Runners-up (2): 2015, 2023
- Malta International Tournament
  - (bronze) Third place (1): 1994
- FIFA Series
  - (bronze) Third place: 2024

=== Awards ===
- African National Team of the Year
  - (gold) First place: 1995, 1999, 2004, 2005
  - (silver) Second place: 1996, 1997

=== Decorations ===
- Tunisia: Officers of the National Order of Merit (24 February 2004)

== See also ==
- Tunisian Football Federation
- Tunisia A' national football team
- Tunisia national under-23 football team
- Tunisia national under-20 football team
- Tunisia national under-18 football team
- Tunisia national under-17 football team
- Tunisia national under-15 football team
- Tunisia women's national football team
- Tunisia women's national under-20 football team
- Tunisia women's national under-17 football team
- Algeria–Tunisia football rivalry

== Notes ==
Achievements
Preceded by –	Arab Cup champions 1963 (First title)	Succeeded by Iraq
Preceded by Cameroon	Africa Cup of Nations champions 2004 (First title)	Succeeded by Egypt
Preceded by DR Congo	African Nations Championship champions 2011 (First title)	Succeeded by Libya
