= Mohamed Bilal =

Mohamed Bilal may refer to:

- Mohamed Gharib Bilal (born 1945), Tanzanian politician
- Mohammed Bilal, Baharani footballer
- Muhammad Bilal (born 1955), Pakistani wrestler
- Mohammad Bilal (born 1975), Pakistani cricketer
