= Rami Suhail =

Iraqi footballer (born 2000)

Personal information
- Full name: Rami Suhail Saber Ali Al-Hamwende
- Date of birth: 27 May 2000 (age 26)
- Place of birth: Iraq
- Position: Winger

Team information
- Current team: Al-Markhiya
- Number: 17

Youth career
- –2019: Al-Sadd

Senior career*
Years	Team	Apps	(Gls)
2019–2021	Al-Sadd	1	(0)
2021–2025	Al-Arabi	33	(2)
2025–2026	Umm Salal	7	(2)
2026–	Al-Markhiya	0	(0)
- * Club domestic league appearances and goals as of 17 January 2026

Rami Suhail (Arabic: رامي سهيل; born 27 May 2000) is an Iraqi professional footballer who plays as a winger for Al-Markhiya.

== Personal life ==
Suhail is the son of former Iraqi national team goalkeeper Suhail Saber. His brother Ahmed Suhail is a football player that has also been naturalised by Qatar.

== Career statistics ==
=== Club ===
As of 1 October 2020.

Club	Season	League			Cup		Continental		Other		Total	
Club	Season	Division	Apps	Goals	Apps	Goals	Apps	Goals	Apps	Goals	Apps	Goals
Al-Sadd	2017–18	Qatar Stars League	0	0	2	1	—		—		2	1
Al-Sadd	2018–19	Qatar Stars League	0	0	5	0	—		—		5	0
Al-Sadd	2019–20	Qatar Stars League	1	0	5	3	0	0	—		6	3
Al-Sadd	2020–21	Qatar Stars League	0	0	0	0	0	0	—		0	0
Career totals			1	0	12	4	0	0	0	0	13	4

== Honours ==
Al Sadd

- Qatar Cup: 2021
