= 1967 Tripoli Fair Tournament =

Tournament details
- Host country: Libya
- Dates: 3–12 March 1967
- Teams: 4 (from 2 confederations)
- Venue: 1 (in 1 host city)

Final positions
- Champions: Iraq (1st title)
- Runners-up: Sudan

Tournament statistics
- Matches played: 5
- Goals scored: 18 (3.6 per match)

The 1967 Tripoli Fair Tournament was the 6th edition of football at the Tripoli International Fair, and was held from 3 to 12 March 1967 in Tripoli, Libya. Four teams participated: Iraq, Sudan, Libya A, and Libya B. Iraq won the tournament.

== Matches ==
| Pos | Team | Pld | W | D | L | GF | GA | GD | Pts | |
|---|---|---|---|---|---|---|---|---|---|---|
| 1 | Iraq | 3 | 2 | 1 | 0 | 7 | 3 | +4 | 5 | Champion |
| 2 | Sudan | 3 | 1 | 2 | 0 | 7 | 5 | +2 | 4 | |
| 3 | Libya | 3 | 1 | 1 | 1 | 6 | 3 | +3 | 3 | |
| 4 | Libya B | 3 | 0 | 0 | 3 | 4 | 13 | −9 | 0 | |

3 March 1967

| Libya B | 2–4 | Sudan |
|---|---|---|
| Al-Bahloul; Al-Toumi | Report | Goal |

5 March 1967

| Libya | 5–1 | Libya B |
|---|---|---|
| Al-Biski; Al-Saghir | Report | Goal |

7 March 1967

| Libya | 1–1 | Sudan |
|---|---|---|
| Al-Saghir | Report | Goal |

7 March 1967

| Libya B | 1–4 | Iraq |
|---|---|---|
| | Report |

10 March 1967

| Sudan | 2–2 | Iraq |
|---|---|---|
| Goal | Report | Khoshaba 7'; Baba 57' |

12 March 1967

| Libya | 0–1 | Iraq |
|---|---|---|
| | Report | Ismail 31' |
