= Tripoli Fair Tournament =

- Founded: 1962
- Abolished: 1978
- Region: Tripoli, Libya
- Last champions: Libya B (1st title)

The Tripoli Fair Tournament (Arabic: دورة معرض طرابلس الدولي) was a regular men's football sporting event at the Tripoli International Fair since the 1962 edition. It has been held eight times; annually between 1962 and 1967, in 1974, and in 1978.

== Results ==
Edition	Year	Champions	Runners-up	Third place	Fourth place	No. of Teams
1	1962	(Soviet Union); Lokomotiv Moscow	Tripoli XI	Tunisia	(United Kingdom); Great Britain Army	4
2	1963	(Libya); Western Governorates	Algeria	(Libya); Eastern Governorates	n/a	3
3	1964	Lebanon	Libya	Morocco B	Sudan B	5
4	1965	Tunisia	Libya	Morocco	Kuwait	4
5	1966	Morocco B	Iraq	Libya	Tunisia	4
6	1967	Iraq	Sudan	Libya A	Libya B	4
7	1974	(Libya); Al Ahli	(Tunisia); Marsa	(Malta); Floriana	n/a	3
8	1978	Libya B	Libya A	Malta	Algeria	4
