= 7th November Cup =

- Organiser(s): Tunisian Football Federation
- Founded: 1991
- Abolished: 1995
- Region: International
- Last champions: Tunisia (3rd title)
- Most championships: Tunisia (3 titles)

The 7th November Cup (Arabic: كأس 7 نوفمبر), was an international friendly football tournament that played every two years between 1991 and 1995. It was part of the 7 November 1987, commemoration ceremonies of former Tunisian President Zine El Abidine Ben Ali.

Three editions played in 1991, 1993 and 1995, and Tunisia won all of them.

== Results ==
Ed.	Year	Host	Champion	Score	Runner-up	Third place	Score	Fourth place	Teams
1	1991	Tunisia	Tunisia	3–0	(England); Luton Town	Senegal and (Armenia) Ararat Yerevan			4
2	1993	Tunisia	Tunisia	2–1	Egypt	Malta	2–1	Gabon	4
3	1995	Tunisia	Tunisia	Round-robin	Algeria	Mauritania			3

== Tournaments ==
=== First edition 1991 ===
Semi-finals
5 November – Tunis
Tunisia	8
(Armenia) FC Ararat Yerevan	2
5 November – Tunis
(England) Luton Town F.C.	1
Senegal	0

Final
7 November – Tunis
Tunisia	3
(England) Luton Town F.C.	1

Semi-finals

5 November 1991

Tunisia	8–2	(Armenia) FC Ararat Yerevan

El Menzah Stadium, Tunis

5 November 1991

Luton Town F.C. (England)	1–0	Senegal

El Menzah Stadium, Tunis

Final

7 November 1991

Tunisia	3–1	(England) Luton Town F.C.

El Menzah Stadium, Tunis

=== Second edition 1993 ===
Semi-finals
5 November – Tunis
Tunisia	4
Gabon	0
5 November – Tunis
Egypt	3
Malta	0

Final
7 November – Tunis
Tunisia	2
Egypt	1
Third place
7 November – Tunis
Malta	2
Gabon	1

Semi-finals

5 November 1993

Tunisia	4–0	Gabon

El Menzah Stadium, Tunis

5 November 1993

Egypt	3–0	Malta

El Menzah Stadium, Tunis

Third place match

7 November 1993

Malta	2–1	Gabon

El Menzah Stadium, Tunis

Final

7 November 1993

Tunisia	2–1	Egypt

El Menzah Stadium, Tunis

=== Third edition 1995 ===
Pos	Team	Pld	W	D	L	GF	GA	GD	Pts	Final result
1	Tunisia (H)	2	2	0	0	4	1	+3	6	Champions
2	Algeria	2	1	0	1	4	1	+3	3	Runner-up
3	Mauritania	2	0	0	2	1	6	−5	0	Third place

Source: RSSSF
(H) Hosts

Matches

3 November 1995

Algeria	4–0	Mauritania
Zekri 24'; Dahleb 42'; Meftah 53'; Belatoui 74' (pen.)	Report

El Menzah Stadium, Tunis
Attendance: 10,000
Referee: Nouira (Tunisia)

5 November 1995

Tunisia	2–0	Algeria
Sellimi 13'; Ben Hassen 56'	Report

El Menzah Stadium, Tunis
Attendance: 20,000
Referee: Lassana Gassama (Mauritania)

7 November 1995

Tunisia	2–1	Mauritania
Ben Hassen 1'; Bouzaiene 29'	Report	Sidibe 52'

El Menzah Stadium, Tunis
Attendance: 5,000
Referee: Boucif Lazzouni (Algeria)

== Statistics ==
Legend

- 1st – Champions
- 2nd – Runners-up
- 3rd – Third place
- 4th – Fourth place
- SF – Semi-finals
- × — Did not enter
- — Hosts

Team	1991 (Tunisia) (4)	1993 (Tunisia) (4)	1995 (Tunisia) (3)
Algeria	×	×	2nd
Egypt	×	2nd	×
(Armenia) FC Ararat Yerevan	SF	×	×
Gabon	×	4th	×
(England) Luton Town F.C.	2nd	×	×
Malta	×	3rd	×
Mauritania	×	×	3rd
Senegal	SF	×	×
Tunisia	1st	1st	1st
