= 1965 Tripoli Fair Tournament =

Tournament details
- Host country: Libya
- City: Tripoli
- Dates: 12–19 March 1965
- Teams: 4 (from 2 confederations)
- Venue: 1 (in 1 host city)

Final positions
- Champions: Tunisia (1st title)
- Runners-up: Libya
- Third place: Morocco
- Fourth place: Kuwait

Tournament statistics
- Matches played: 6
- Goals scored: 14 (2.33 per match)

The 1965 Tripoli Fair Tournament was the 4th edition of football at the Tripoli International Fair, and was held from 12 to 19 March 1965 in Tripoli, Libya. Four teams participated: Kuwait, Libya, Morocco, and Tunisia. Tunisia won the tournament.

== Results ==
=== Standings ===
Pos	Team	Pld	W	D	L	GF	GA	GD	Pts	Qualification
1	Tunisia	3	2	1	0	4	2	+2	5	Champion
2	Libya	3	2	0	1	7	4	+3	4	
3	Morocco	3	1	1	1	2	1	+1	3	
4	Kuwait	3	0	0	3	1	7	−6	0	

Source: Kooora.com

=== Matches ===
12 March 1965

Morocco	2–0	Kuwait
	Report

Tripoli Stadium, Tripoli
14 March 1965

Tunisia	0–0	Morocco
	Report

Tripoli Stadium, Tripoli

14 March 1965

Libya	4–1	Kuwait
	Report

Tripoli Stadium, Tripoli
16 March 1965

Tunisia	3–2	Libya
	Report

Tripoli Stadium, Tripoli

19 March 1965

Tunisia	1–0	Kuwait
	Report

Tripoli Stadium, Tripoli
19 March 1965

Libya	1–0	Morocco
	Report

Tripoli Stadium, Tripoli
