= Ahmed Suhail =

Qatari footballer (born 1999)

Personal information
- Full name: Ahmed Suhail Saber Ali Al-Hamawende
- Date of birth: 8 February 1999 (age 27)
- Place of birth: Iraq
- Height: 1.88 m (6 ft 2 in)
- Position: Defender

Team information
- Current team: Al-Sadd
- Number: 37

Senior career*
Years	Team	Apps	(Gls)
2017–	Al-Sadd	54	(1)
2018–2019	→ Al-Ahli (loan)	6	(1)
2019–2020	→ Al-Wakrah (loan)	13	(0)
2021–2022	→ Al-Arabi (loan)	16	(1)
2023	→ Al-Arabi (loan)	10	(0)

International career
2018	Qatar U19	4	(1)
2018	Qatar U21	6	(0)
2018–2022	Qatar U23	14	(1)
2021–	Qatar	9	(0)
- * Club domestic league appearances and goals as of 17 January 2026

Ahmed Suhail Saber Al-Hamawende (born 8 February 1999) is a professional footballer who plays as a defender for Al-Sadd. Born in Iraq, he represents the Qatar national team.

== Personal life ==
Suhail is the son of former Iraqi national team goalkeeper Suhail Saber. His brother is Rami Suhail who is a football player also naturalised by Qatar.

== Club career ==
Suhail began his professional career with Al Sadd SC in 2017. In November 2018 he was loaned to Al-Ahli SC and in July 2019 to Al-Wakrah SC. He has been on loan to Al-Arabi SC since September 2021.

== Honours ==
Al-Sadd

- Qatar Stars League: 2020–21
- Qatari Stars Cup: 2019–20
- Emir of Qatar Cup: 2020
- Qatar Cup: 2021

Al-Arabi

- Qatar FA Cup: 2022
