= Najeh Rahim =

Iraqi association football player

Personal information
- Full name: Najeh Rahim Salman
- Date of birth: 27 September 1959 (age 67)
- Place of birth: Iraq
- Position: Forward

International career
Years	Team	Apps	(Gls)
1985	Iraq		

Najeh Rahim (born 27 September 1959) is a former Iraqi football forward who played for Iraq in the 1985 Arab Nations Cup and 1985 Pan Arab Games.

Najeh played for the national team in 1985.
