= Amadou Cissé (Mauritanian footballer) =

Mauritanian association football player

Personal information
- Full name: Amadou Cissé
- Place of birth: Nouakchott, Mauritania
- Date of death: 30 September 2017
- Place of death: Nouakchott, Mauritania
- Position: Defender

Senior career*
Years	Team	Apps	(Gls)
–	ASAC Concorde	–	(–)

International career
–	Mauritania	–	(–)
- * Club domestic league appearances and goals

Amadou Cissé (Arabic: أمادو سيسي; born in Nouakchott; died on 30 September 2017) was a Mauritanian international football player and manager.
