= Football at the 2007 All-Africa Games – Men's team squads =

Below are the squads for the Football at the 2007 All-Africa Games, hosted by Algiers, Algeria, and which took place between 10 and 23 July 2007.

== Group B ==
=== Algeria ===
Head coach: Mahmoud Guendouz

| No. | Pos. | Player | Date of birth (age) | Club |
|---|---|---|---|---|
| | GK | Mohamed Lamine Zemmamouche | 19 March 1985 (aged 22) | (Algerian Football Federation) USM Alger |
| | DF | Rafik Halliche | 2 September 1986 (aged 20) | (Algerian Football Federation) NA Hussein Dey |
| | DF | Sid Ahmed Khedis | 22 August 1985 (aged 21) | (Algerian Football Federation) NA Hussein Dey |
| | DF | Mohamed Rabie Meftah | 5 May 1985 (aged 22) | (Algerian Football Federation) JS Kabylie |
| | DF | Nacereddine Khoualed | 16 April 1986 (aged 21) | (Algerian Football Federation) USM Alger |
| | DF | Abdellah Chebira | 12 July 1986 (aged 20) | (Algerian Football Federation) USM Blida |
| | MF | Mourad Delhoum | 10 February 1985 (aged 22) | (Algerian Football Federation) ES Sétif |
| | MF | Bilel Herbache | 4 January 1986 (aged 21) | (Algerian Football Federation) USM Blida |
| | MF | Hamza Aït Ouamar | 26 December 1986 (aged 20) | (Algerian Football Federation) CR Belouizdad |
| | MF | Tayeb Maroci | 1 June 1985 (aged 22) | (Algerian Football Federation) USM Blida |
| | FW | Sid Ali Yahia-Chérif | 4 January 1985 (aged 22) | (Algerian Football Federation) RC Kouba |
| | FW | Hadj Bouguèche | 7 December 1983 (aged 23) | (Algerian Football Federation) MC Alger |
| | FW | Yassine Boukhari | 6 June 1986 (aged 21) | (Algerian Football Federation) ASO Chlef |
| | FW | Sofiane Younès | 25 November 1982 (aged 24) | (Algerian Football Federation) MC Alger |
| | FW | Mohamed Amine Aoudia | 6 June 1987 (aged 20) | (Algerian Football Federation) CR Belouizdad |
