= AS Armée Nationale =

- Full name: Association Sportive de l'Armée Nationale Mauritanienne
- Founded: 1960; 66 years ago
- Ground: Stade Olympique (Nouakchott); Nouakchott, Mauritania
- Capacity: 10,000
- League: Mauritanean Premier League

Association Sportive de l'Armée Nationale Mauritanienne (Arabic: الجمعية الرياضية للجيش الوطني الموريتاني), known as AS Armée Nationale, is a Mauritanean football club based in Tidjikja, the capital of the Tagant Region. The club plays in the Mauritanean Premier League.

== Stadium ==
Currently the team plays at the 10,000 capacity Stade Olympique (Nouakchott).
