= Hameed Rashid =

Iraqi association football player (born 1963)

Personal information
- Full name: Hameed Rashid Abdul Nour
- Date of birth: 8 January 1963 (age 63)
- Place of birth: Iraq
- Position: Defender

International career
Years	Team	Apps	(Gls)
1985–1988	Iraq	5	(1)

Hameed Rashid (Arabic: حَمِيد رَشِيد عَبْد النُّور; born 8 January 1963) is a former Iraqi football defender who played for Iraq in the 1985 Pan Arab Games and 1985 Arab Nations Cup.

Hadi played for the national team between 1985 and 1988.
