= Khaled Hadi =

Iraqi association football player

Personal information
- Full name: Khaled Hadi Mahdi
- Date of birth: 1 February 1962 (age 64)
- Place of birth: Iraq
- Position: Midfielder

International career
Years	Team	Apps	(Gls)
1985	Iraq		

Khaled Hadi (born 1 February 1962) is a former Iraqi football midfielder who played for Iraq in the 1985 Pan Arab Games.

Hadi played for the national team in 1985.
