= Mohammed Bilal =

Bahraini footballer

Personal information
- Full name: Mohammed Bilal
- Place of birth: Bahrain

International career
Years	Team	Apps	(Gls)
–	Bahrain		

Mohammed Bilal is a former Bahraini international football player who played for the Bahrain national team in the 1985 Arab Cup.
