= Hussein Ali Thajil =

Iraqi association football player

Personal information
- Full name: Hussein Ali Thajil
- Date of birth: 1 July 1958 (age 68)
- Place of birth: Iraq
- Position: Midfielder

Senior career*
Years	Team	Apps	(Gls)
- Al-Quwa Al-Jawiya

International career
1978-1985	Iraq		
- * Club domestic league appearances and goals

Hussein Ali Thajil (born 1 July 1958) is an Iraqi former football midfielder who played for Iraq in the 1978 Asian Games.

Hesham played for the national team in 1978.
