= Taleb Jaloub =

Iraqi footballer

Personal information
- Full name: Taleb Jaloub
- Date of birth: 1 July 1955 (age 71)
- Position: Defender

International career
Years	Team	Apps	(Gls)
1985	Iraq		

Managerial career
- 2013: Iraq U17

Taleb Jaloub (born 1 July 1955) is a former Iraqi football defender. He competed in the 1985 Pan Arab Games. Jaloub played for Iraq in 1985.
