= Suhail Saber =

Iraqi footballer

Personal information
- Full name: Suhail Saber Ali Al-Hamwende
- Date of birth: 1 June 1962 (age 64)
- Place of birth: Iraq
- Position: Goalkeeper

Senior career*
Years	Team	Apps	(Gls)
- Wahid Hozaeran
- Al-Talaba SC

International career
1985–1990	Iraq		
- * Club domestic league appearances and goals

Suhail Saber Ali Al-Hamwende (Arabic: سهيل صابر علي الحموندي; born 1 June 1962) is a former Iraqi football goalkeeper. He competed in the 1986 Asian Games. Saber played for Iraq between 1985 and 1990.

== Personal life ==
His sons Ahmed and Rami play football. The latter represents the Qatar national team.
