= Iraq national football team results (1980–1989) =

This is a list of the Iraq national football team results from 1980 to 1989.

== Results ==
Win Draw Loss Fixtures

=== 1980s ===
1980

27 February 1980 Friendly	Iraq	1–1	Poland	Baghdad, Iraq
	Jassim 41'			Stadium: Al-Shaab Stadium

29 February 1980 Friendly	Iraq	1–0	Poland	Baghdad, Iraq
	Ashraf 62'			Stadium: Al-Shaab Stadium

16 March 1980 1980 Olympics qualifiers	Iraq	4–0	Jordan	Baghdad, Iraq
	Ahmed 18', 52'; Jassim 62'; Saeed 75'			Stadium: Al-Shaab Stadium

20 March 1980 1980 Olympics qualifiers	Iraq	1–0	Syria	Baghdad, Iraq
	Ashraf 70'			Stadium: Al-Shaab Stadium

26 March 1980 1980 Olympics qualifiers	Iraq	0–0	Kuwait	Baghdad, Iraq
				Stadium: Al-Shaab Stadium

28 March 1980 1980 Olympics qualifiers	Iraq	3–0	South Yemen	Baghdad, Iraq
	Saeed 3', 82'; Khudhair 61'			Stadium: Al-Shaab Stadium

31 March 1980 1980 Olympics qualifiers	Iraq	2–3	Kuwait	Baghdad, Iraq
	Ashraf 6', 44'		Yaqoub 69' (pen.), 82'; Al-Ghanim 79'	Stadium: Al-Shaab Stadium; Attendance: 65,000

22 June 1980 Friendly	Poland	3–0	Iraq	Warsaw, Poland
				Stadium: National Stadium

21 July 1980 1980 Olympics	Iraq	3–0	Costa Rica	Kiev, Soviet Union
12:00	Ahmed 45'; Saeed 49'; Hassan 75'	Report		Stadium: Republican Stadium; Referee: Nyirenda Chayu (Zambia)

23 July 1980 1980 Olympics	Finland	0–0	Iraq	Kiev, Soviet Union
12:00		Report		Stadium: Republican Stadium; Attendance: 40,000; Referee: Ramón Calderón Castro (Cuba)

25 July 1980 1980 Olympics	Yugoslavia	1–1	Iraq	Minsk, Soviet Union
12:00	Zoran Vujović 63'	Report	Hassan 61'	Stadium: Dinamo Stadium; Referee: André Daina (Switzerland)

27 July 1980 1980 Olympics	East Germany	4–0	Iraq	Kiev, Soviet Union
12:00	Schnuphase 4' (pen.); Netz 11'; Steinbach 17'; Terletzki 22'	Report		Stadium: Republican Stadium; Attendance: 48,000; Referee: Romualdo Arppi Filho (Brazil)

1981

6 February 1981 Friendly	Jordan	0–2	Iraq	Amman, Jordan
			Hassan	Stadium: King Abdullah Stadium

8 February 1981 Friendly	Jordan	0–2	Iraq	Amman, Jordan
			Saeed; Hashim	Stadium: King Abdullah Stadium

8 March 1981 Friendly	Morocco	1–1	Iraq	Fez, Morocco
			Saeed	Stadium: Fez Stadium

18 March 1981 1982 WCQ	Iraq	1–0	Qatar	Riyadh, Saudi Arabia
	Saeed 84'			Stadium: King Fahd International Stadium; Referee: Boskovic (Australia)

21 March 1981 1982 WCQ	Saudi Arabia	1–0	Iraq	Riyadh, Saudi Arabia
	Mohammad 82'			Stadium: King Fahd International Stadium; Referee: Boskovic (Australia)

25 March 1981 1982 WCQ	Iraq	2–0	Bahrain	Riyadh, Saudi Arabia
	Ahmed 26'; Dirjal 89'			Stadium: King Fahd International Stadium; Referee: Dhillon (Singapore)

30 March 1981 1982 WCQ	Iraq	2–1	Syria	Riyadh, Saudi Arabia
	Ashraf 34'; Khudhair 63'		Jehad	Stadium: King Fahd International Stadium; Referee: Rampley (Australia)

10 September 1981 Merdeka Tournament	Iraq	7–1	Thailand	Kuala Lumpur, Malaysia
	Abdul-Sahib; Aziz; Farhan; Khudhair			Stadium: Merdeka Stadium

13 September 1981 Merdeka Tournament	Iraq	1–1	South Korea	Kuala Lumpur, Malaysia
	Aziz 60'			Stadium: Merdeka Stadium

16 September 1981 Merdeka Tournament	Iraq	4–0	Singapore	Kuala Lumpur, Malaysia
	Aziz; Ahmed; Hussein; Hassan			Stadium: Merdeka Stadium

18 September 1981 Merdeka Tournament	Iraq	2–0	Japan	Kuala Lumpur, Malaysia
	Hussein 8'; Aziz 60'			Stadium: Merdeka Stadium

1982

19 February 1982 Friendly	Iraq	3–1	Jordan	Baghdad, Iraq
	Hassan 9', 55', 59'			Stadium: Al-Shaab Stadium

21 February 1982 Friendly	Iraq	7–1	Jordan	Baghdad, Iraq
	Hashim 1', 26', 87'; Shihab 8', 40'; Aziz 61', 86'			Stadium: Al-Shaab Stadium

2 March 1982 Friendly	Iraq	0–0	East Germany	Baghdad, Iraq
				Stadium: Al-Shaab Stadium

4 March 1982 Friendly	Iraq	1–1	East Germany	Baghdad, Iraq
	Saeed 27'			Stadium: Al-Shaab Stadium

7 March 1982 Friendly	Iraq	3–0	South Korea	Baghdad, Iraq
	Saeed 29'; Hassan 53', 87'			Stadium: Al-Shaab Stadium

10 March 1982 Friendly	Iraq	1–1	South Korea	Baghdad, Iraq
	Saeed			Stadium: Al-Shaab Stadium

20 March 1982 6th Arabian Gulf Cup	Iraq	4–0	Oman	Abu Dhabi, United Arab Emirates
	Saeed 24'; Dirjal 32', 90'; Farhan 75'			Stadium: Zayed Sports City Stadium

22 March 1982 6th Arabian Gulf Cup	Iraq	3–0	Bahrain	Abu Dhabi, United Arab Emirates
	Aziz 41'; Saeed 84', 88'			Stadium: Zayed Sports City Stadium

24 March 1982 6th Arabian Gulf Cup	Iraq	1–1	Saudi Arabia	Abu Dhabi, United Arab Emirates
	Saeed 84'			Stadium: Zayed Sports City Stadium

26 March 1982 6th Arabian Gulf Cup	Iraq	2–1	Qatar	Abu Dhabi, United Arab Emirates
	Mohammed			Stadium: Zayed Sports City Stadium

30 March 1982 6th Arabian Gulf Cup	Iraq	1–0	United Arab Emirates	Abu Dhabi, United Arab Emirates
	Saeed 49'			Stadium: Zayed Sports City Stadium

9 November 1982 Friendly	Kuwait	1–0	Iraq	Kuwait City, Kuwait
				Stadium: Al-Sadaqua Walsalam Stadium

21 November 1982 1982 Asian Games	Iraq	4–0	Burma	New Delhi, India
	Hashim 10'; Saeed 32'; Shihab 54'; Mohammed 86'			Stadium: Jawaharlal Nehru Stadium

23 November 1982 1982 Asian Games	Iraq	3–0	Nepal	New Delhi, India
	Odisho 3'; Saeed 56', 75'			Stadium: Jawaharlal Nehru Stadium

25 November 1982 1982 Asian Games	Iraq	1–2	Kuwait	New Delhi, India
	Shihab 73'			Stadium: Jawaharlal Nehru Stadium

27 November 1982 1982 Asian Games	Iraq	1–0 (a.e.t.)	Japan	New Delhi, India
	Jassim 102'			Stadium: Jawaharlal Nehru Stadium

1 December 1982 1982 Asian Games	Saudi Arabia	0–1	Iraq	New Delhi, India
			Mohammed 17'	Stadium: Jawaharlal Nehru Stadium

3 December 1982 1982 Asian Games	Kuwait	0–1	Iraq	New Delhi, India
			Saeed 82'	Stadium: Jawaharlal Nehru Stadium

1983

28 April 1983 Friendly	Iraq	0–1	Egypt	Baghdad, Iraq
				Stadium: Al-Shaab Stadium

9 September 1983 1984 Olympics qualifiers	Iraq	0–0	Bahrain	Baghdad, Iraq
				Stadium: Al-Shaab Stadium

16 September 1983 1984 Olympics qualifiers	Iraq	0–0	United Arab Emirates	Baghdad, Iraq
				Stadium: Al-Shaab Stadium

7 October 1983 1984 Olympics qualifiers	Bahrain	1–2	Iraq	Manama, Bahrain
			Shihab; Saeed

10 October 1983 1984 Olympics qualifiers	United Arab Emirates	2–2	Iraq	Sharjah, United Arab Emirates
			Radhi; Saddam

1984

27 February 1984 Friendly	Egypt	1–2	Iraq	Cairo, Egypt
			Saeed; Hamad

29 February 1984 Friendly	Egypt	0–0	Iraq	Cairo, Egypt

11 March 1984 7th Arabian Gulf Cup	Iraq	2–1	Oman	Muscat, Oman
	Saeed 25', 29'		Hamdan 45'	Stadium: Royal Oman Police Stadium

15 March 1984 7th Arabian Gulf Cup	Iraq	0–0	United Arab Emirates	Muscat, Oman
				Stadium: Royal Oman Police Stadium

17 March 1984 7th Arabian Gulf Cup	Iraq	4–0	Saudi Arabia	Muscat, Oman
	Shaker 25'; Saeed 57', 70', 84'			Stadium: Royal Oman Police Stadium

20 March 1984 7th Arabian Gulf Cup	Iraq	1–0	Bahrain	Muscat, Oman
	Hashim 66'			Stadium: Royal Oman Police Stadium

22 March 1984 7th Arabian Gulf Cup	Iraq	3–1	Kuwait	Muscat, Oman
	Saeed 47', 75'; Allawi 80'		Fulaiteh 59'	Stadium: Royal Oman Police Stadium

25 March 1984 7th Arabian Gulf Cup	Qatar	2–1	Iraq	Muscat, Oman
	Muftah 26'; Gorgis 41' (o.g.)		Radhi 55'	Stadium: Royal Oman Police Stadium

28 March 1984 7th Arabian Gulf Cup	Iraq	1–1 (a.e.t.) (3–2 p)	Qatar	Muscat, Oman
	Dirjal 102'		Muftah 109'	Stadium: Royal Oman Police Stadium

18 April 1984 1984 Olympics qualifiers	Iraq	2–1	Thailand	Kallang, Singapore
	Munir; Jassim

21 April 1984 1984 Olympics qualifiers	Iraq	2–1	Japan	Kallang, Singapore
	Munir 2'; Dirjal 45'		Hara 34'

24 April 1984 1984 Olympics qualifiers	Qatar	2–0	Iraq	Kallang, Singapore

26 April 1984 1984 Olympics qualifiers	Iraq	2–0	Malaysia	Kallang, Singapore
	Saeed; Allawi

29 April 1984 1984 Olympics qualifiers	Iraq	1–0	South Korea	Kallang, Singapore
	Dirjal 43'

18 May 1984 1985 Arab Cup qualification	Jordan	3–2 (a.e.t.)	Iraq	Amman, Jordan
	Abu-Ahed 51'; Ibrahim 68'; Awad 93'		Saeed 43', 75'	Stadium: Amman International Stadium

30 July 1984 1984 Olympics	Canada	1–1	Iraq	Boston, United States
19:30	Gray 70'	Report	Saeed 83'	Stadium: Harvard Stadium; Attendance: 16,730; Referee: Díaz (COL)

1 August 1984 1984 Olympics	Cameroon	1–0	Iraq	Boston, United States
19:00	Bahoken 7'	Report		Stadium: Harvard Stadium; Attendance: 20,000; Referee: Socha (USA)

3 August 1984 1984 Olympics	Iraq	2–4	Yugoslavia	Annapolis, United States
19:00	Saeed 17'; Shihab 43'	Report	Deverić 55', 76', 87'; Nikolić 86'	Stadium: Navy–Marine Corps Memorial Stadium; Attendance: 24,430; Referee: Sano (JPN)

1985

15 March 1985 1986 WCQ	Iraq	6–0	Lebanon	Kuwait City, Kuwait
	Radhi; Saeed; Allawi; Hashim			Referee: Fallaj Al-Shanar (Saudi Arabia)

18 March 1985 1986 WCQ	Lebanon	0–6	Iraq	Kuwait City, Kuwait
			Radhi; Saeed; Allawi	Referee: Fahd Al-Dahmash (Saudi Arabia)

29 March 1985 1986 WCQ	Jordan	2–3	Iraq	Amman, Jordan
	Al-Dawud; Abu Abed	Report	Munir; Radhi; Saeed	Stadium: King Abdullah Stadium; Referee: Abdulaziz Saleh Al-Salmi (Kuwait)

5 April 1985 1986 WCQ	Qatar	3–0	Iraq	Doha, Qatar
	Muftah 40'; Al-Mohannadi 52' (pen.); Al-Ammari 71'	Report		Stadium: Grand Hamad Stadium; Referee: George Courtney (England)

19 April 1985 1986 WCQ	Iraq	2–0	Jordan	Kuwait City, Kuwait
	Radhi 46'; Allawi 50'	Report		Referee: Jamal Al-Sharif (Syria)

5 May 1985 1986 WCQ	Iraq	2–1	Qatar	Calcutta, India
	Radhi 21'; Allawi 76'	Report	Muftah 44'	Stadium: Yuva Bharati Krirangan; Attendance: 30,000; Referee: Na Yoon-Shik (South Korea)

9 June 1985 1985 President's Cup	Canada	1–6	Iraq	Gwangju, South Korea
	Catliff		Hashim; Saddam; Allawi	Stadium: Gwangju Mudeung Stadium

15 June 1985 1985 President's Cup	South Korea	2–0	Iraq	Seoul, South Korea
	Choi Soon-ho 2', 87'			Stadium: Dongdaemun Stadium

4 July 1985 1985 Arab Cup	Iraq	1–1	Bahrain	Taif, Saudi Arabia
	Abid		Eid	Stadium: King Fahd Stadium

8 July 1985 1985 Arab Cup	Iraq	2–0	Mauritania	Taif, Saudi Arabia
	Abid; Mahmoud		Eid	Stadium: King Fahd Stadium

10 July 1985 1985 Arab Cup	Iraq	3–2	Saudi Arabia	Taif, Saudi Arabia
	Abid 12', 18'; Rashid 28'	Report	Nu'eimeh 12' (pen.); Abd Al-Jawad 88'	Stadium: King Fahd Stadium; Referee: Belaïd Lacarne (Algeria)

12 July 1985 1985 Arab Cup	Iraq	1–0	Bahrain	Taif, Saudi Arabia
	Abid 21'	Report		Stadium: King Fahd Stadium; Referee: Abdul Aziz Al-Salmi (Kuwait)

6 August 1985 1985 Arab Games	Iraq	2–0	Libya	Casablanca, Morocco
	Radhi; Abid			Stadium: Stade Mohammed V

12 August 1985 1985 Arab Games	Iraq	2–0	Syria	Casablanca, Morocco
	Allawi; Mahmoud			Stadium: Stade Mohammed V

14 August 1985 1985 Arab Games	Iraq	2–1	Saudi Arabia	Casablanca, Morocco
	Radhi		21' (pen.) Abdullah	Stadium: Stade Mohammed V

16 August 1985 1985 Arab Games	Morocco	0–1	Iraq	Rabat, Morocco
			Gorgis 8'	Stadium: Moulay Abdellah Stadium

8 September 1985 Friendly	Saudi Arabia	3–1	Iraq	Taif, Saudi Arabia
			Saeed

10 September 1985 Friendly	Saudi Arabia	2–0	Iraq	Jeddah, Saudi Arabia

20 September 1985 1986 WCQ	United Arab Emirates	2–3	Iraq	Dubai, United Arab Emirates
	Al-Talyani 15', Fahad Khamees 60'	Report	Saeed 42', 79'; Hassan 81'	Stadium: Al-Rashid Stadium; Referee: Abdul-Aziz Saleh Al-Salmi (Kuwait)

27 September 1985 1986 WCQ	Iraq	1–2	United Arab Emirates	Taif, Saudi Arabia
	Saddam 88'	Report	F. Khamis 2'; Al-Talyani 60'	Stadium: King Fahd Stadium; Attendance: 4,175; Referee: Daina (Switzerland)

1 November 1985 Friendly	Iraq	3–1	Bahrain	Baghdad, Iraq
	Shihab 15'; Radhi 47'; Hashim 70'			Stadium: Al-Shaab Stadium

15 November 1985 1986 WCQ	Syria	0–0	Iraq	Damascus, Syria
		Report		Stadium: Abbasiyyin Stadium; Attendance: 25,000; Referee: Vautrot (France)

29 November 1985 1986 WCQ	Iraq	3–1	Syria	Taif, Saudi Arabia
	Saeed 28'; Mahmoud 49'; Allawi 72'	Report	Walid Abou El-Sel 54'	Stadium: King Fahd Stadium; Attendance: 4,500; Referee: Erik Fredriksson (Sweden)

1986

1 February 1986 Friendly	Iraq	0–2	Denmark	Baghdad, Iraq
				Stadium: Al-Shaab Stadium

3 February 1986 Friendly	Iraq	2–0	Denmark	Baghdad, Iraq
	Saeed 45' (pen.); Hashim 62'			Stadium: Al-Shaab Stadium

14 March 1986 Friendly	Iraq	1–1	Romania	Baghdad, Iraq
	Mohammed 24'			Stadium: Al-Shaab Stadium

17 March 1986 Friendly	Iraq	0–0	Romania	Baghdad, Iraq
				Stadium: Al-Shaab Stadium

22 March 1986 8th Arabian Gulf Cup	Bahrain	0–0	Iraq	Riffa, Bahrain
				Stadium: Bahrain National Stadium

24 March 1986 8th Arabian Gulf Cup	Iraq	2–2	United Arab Emirates	Riffa, Bahrain
	Saddam 26'; Hussein 62'			Stadium: Bahrain National Stadium

27 March 1986 8th Arabian Gulf Cup	Iraq	1–1	Qatar	Riffa, Bahrain
	Jafar 61'			Stadium: Bahrain National Stadium

30 March 1986 8th Arabian Gulf Cup	Iraq	1–2	Saudi Arabia	Riffa, Bahrain
	Saddam 75'			Stadium: Bahrain National Stadium

3 April 1986 8th Arabian Gulf Cup	Iraq	1–2	Kuwait	Riffa, Bahrain
	Jassim 74'			Stadium: Bahrain National Stadium

6 April 1986 8th Arabian Gulf Cup	Iraq	3–2	Oman	Riffa, Bahrain
	Hameed 27', 58', 89'			Stadium: Bahrain National Stadium

4 June 1986 1986 FIFA World Cup	Paraguay	1–0	Iraq	Toluca, Mexico
	Romero 35'	Report		Stadium: Estadio Nemesio Díez; Attendance: 24,000; Referee: Edwin Picon-Ackong (Mauritius)

8 June 1986 1986 FIFA World Cup	Iraq	1–2	Belgium	Toluca, Mexico
	Radhi 59'	Report	Scifo 16'; Claesen 21' (pen.)	Stadium: Estadio Nemesio Díez; Attendance: 20,000; Referee: Jesús Díaz (Colombia)

11 June 1986 1986 FIFA World Cup	Iraq	0–1	Mexico	Mexico City, Mexico
		Report	Quirarte 54'	Stadium: Estadio Azteca; Attendance: 103,763; Referee: Zoran Petrović (Yugoslavia)

21 September 1986 1986 Asian Games	Iraq	4–0	Oman	Daegu, South Korea
	Allawi 13', 69'; Saeed 35'; Radhi 78'			Stadium: Daegu Stadium

23 September 1986 1986 Asian Games	Pakistan	1–5	Iraq	Daegu, South Korea
	Sarwar 26' (pen.)		Radhi 14'; Hameed 22', 42'; Mohammed 34', 85'	Stadium: Daegu Stadium

25 September 1986 1986 Asian Games	United Arab Emirates	2–1	Iraq	Daegu, South Korea
			Saeed	Stadium: Daegu Stadium

27 September 1986 1986 Asian Games	Thailand	1–2	Iraq	Daegu, South Korea
			Dirjal; Mohammed	Stadium: Daegu Stadium

1 October 1986 1986 Asian Games	Saudi Arabia	1–1 (a.e.t.) (9–8 p)	Iraq	Seoul, South Korea
	Al-Shehrani 39'		Mohammed 51'	Stadium: Olympic Stadium

1987

21 February 1987 Friendly	Kuwait	2–0	Iraq	Kuwait City, Kuwait
				Stadium: Al-Kuwait Stadium

27 March 1987 1988 Olympics qualifiers	Iraq	1–1	United Arab Emirates	Kuwait City, Kuwait
	Radhi

8 April 1987 Friendly	Bahrain	1–3	Iraq	Manama, Bahrain
			Saeed; Radhi

10 April 1987 Friendly	Bahrain	1–2	Iraq	Manama, Bahrain
			Jafar; Mousa

17 April 1987 1988 Olympics qualifiers	Jordan	1–2	Iraq	Amman, Jordan
	Abu Abed 40'		Saeed 3'; Dirjal 86'

24 April 1987 1988 Olympics qualifiers	Iraq	2–0	Jordan	Kuwait City, Kuwait
	Saeed 25'; Qais

1 May 1987 1988 Olympics qualifiers	United Arab Emirates	0–3	Iraq	Abu Dhabi, United Arab Emirates
			Hashim 40'; Radhi 76'; Qais 89'

4 December 1987 1988 Olympics qualifiers	Saudi Arabia	0–0	Iraq	Riyadh, Saudi Arabia

11 December 1987 1988 Olympics qualifiers	Qatar	1–3	Iraq	Doha, Qatar
			Saeed 41'; Shihab 59'; Hashim 89'

18 December 1987 1988 Olympics qualifiers	Kuwait	2–1	Iraq	Kuwait City, Kuwait
	Suleiman 6'; Al-Hajiri 22'		Allawi 65'

1988

1 January 1988 1988 Olympics qualifiers	Iraq	1–1	Saudi Arabia	Muscat, Oman
	Shaker 51' (pen.)

8 January 1988 1988 Olympics qualifiers	Iraq	4–1	Qatar	Muscat, Oman
	Jafar 9', 76'; Radhi 16'; Shihab 17'

15 January 1988 1988 Olympics qualifiers	Iraq	1–0	Kuwait	Muscat, Oman
	Karim Allawi 22'

25 February 1988 Friendly	Tunisia	0–2	Iraq	Tunis, Tunisia
			Radhi; Gorgis

4 March 1988 9th Arabian Gulf Cup	Iraq	1–1	Oman	Riyadh, Saudi Arabia
	Shihab 50'		Hamdan 36'	Stadium: King Fahd International Stadium

8 March 1988 9th Arabian Gulf Cup	Iraq	1–0	Kuwait	Riyadh, Saudi Arabia
	Radhi 39'			Stadium: King Fahd International Stadium

10 March 1988 9th Arabian Gulf Cup	United Arab Emirates	0–0	Iraq	Riyadh, Saudi Arabia
				Stadium: King Fahd International Stadium

13 March 1988 9th Arabian Gulf Cup	Iraq	3–0	Qatar	Riyadh, Saudi Arabia
	Jafar 58'; Radhi 80', 81'			Stadium: King Fahd International Stadium

16 March 1988 9th Arabian Gulf Cup	Iraq	2–0	Saudi Arabia	Riyadh, Saudi Arabia
	Radhi 59'; Gorgis 72'			Stadium: King Fahd International Stadium

18 March 1988 9th Arabian Gulf Cup	Iraq	1–0	Bahrain	Riyadh, Saudi Arabia
	Hussein 49'			Stadium: King Fahd International Stadium

9 July 1988 1988 Arab Cup	Iraq	1–1	Tunisia	Amman, Jordan
	Radhi 32'		Mahjoubi 62'	Stadium: Amman International Stadium

11 July 1988 1988 Arab Cup	Iraq	0–0	Lebanon	Amman, Jordan
				Stadium: Amman International Stadium

15 July 1988 1988 Arab Cup	Iraq	2–0	Saudi Arabia	Amman, Jordan
	Radhi 13', 35'			Stadium: Amman International Stadium

17 July 1988 1988 Arab Cup	Iraq	0–0	Egypt	Amman, Jordan
				Stadium: Amman International Stadium

19 July 1988 1988 Arab Cup	Iraq	3–0	Jordan	Amman, Jordan
	Radhi 22'; Abed Ali 45'; Sharif 80'			Stadium: Amman International Stadium

21 July 1988 1988 Arab Cup	Iraq	1–1 (a.e.t.) (4–3 p)	Syria	Amman, Jordan
	Gorgis 34'		Al-Nasser 33'	Stadium: Amman International Stadium
	Penalties
	Mohammed (penalty missed); Hussein (penalty scored); Qais (penalty scored); Shaker (penalty scored); Oraibi (penalty scored)		(penalty scored) Kardaghli; (penalty missed) Ahmad; (penalty missed) Jakalan; (penalty scored) Saad; (penalty scored) Leyous

9 September 1988 Friendly	South Korea	2–1	Iraq	Seoul, South Korea
			Abed Ali 50'

17 September 1988 1988 Olympics	Zambia	2–2	Iraq	Daejon, South Korea
19:00	Nyirenda 44'; K.Bwalya 66'		Radhi 36' (pen.); Allawi 71'	Stadium: Daejeon Hanbat Stadium; Attendance: 29,600; Referee: Díaz (COL)

19 September 1988 1988 Olympics	Iraq	3–0	Guatemala	Daejon, South Korea
19:00	Radhi 57'; Jabbar 67'; Mazariegos 77' (o.g.)			Stadium: Daejeon Hanbat Stadium; Attendance: 23,500

21 September 1988 1988 Olympics	Iraq	0–2	Italy	Seoul, South Korea
19:00			Rizzitelli 59'; Mauro 63'	Stadium: Dongdaemun Stadium; Attendance: 13,000

27 December 1988 Friendly	Iraq	0–2	Kuwait	Baghdad, Iraq
				Stadium: Al-Shaab Stadium

1989

6 January 1989 1990 WCQ	Oman	1–1	Iraq	Muscat, Oman
	Mahmoud 37'		Sharif 18'	Stadium: Royal Oman Police Stadium; Referee: Pratumthong (Thailand)

13 January 1989 1990 WCQ	Jordan	0–1	Iraq	Amman, Jordan
			Jafar 60'	Stadium: Amman International Stadium; Referee: Mandi (Bahrain)

20 January 1989 1990 WCQ	Qatar	1–0	Iraq	Doha, Qatar
	Al-Soufi 21'			Stadium: Grand Hamad Stadium; Attendance: 3,243; Referee: Zhong Bohong (China PR)

27 January 1989 1990 WCQ	Iraq	3–1	Oman	Baghdad, Iraq
	Shihab 33'; Hashim 54'; Radhi 85'		Nasser 90'	Stadium: Al-Shaab Stadium; Referee: Bujsaim (United Arab Emirates)

3 February 1989 1990 WCQ	Iraq	4–0	Jordan	Baghdad, Iraq
	Radhi 26', 42', 66', 80'			Stadium: Al-Shaab Stadium; Referee: Hi Yacob (Malaysia)

10 February 1989 1990 WCQ	Iraq	2–2	Qatar	Baghdad, Iraq
	Radhi 31'; Saeed 75'		S. Aid 18'; Khamis 85'	Stadium: Al-Shaab Stadium; Referee: Sano (Japan)

15 October 1989 Friendly	Iraq	1–0	Kuwait	Baghdad, Iraq
	Hashim			Stadium: Al-Shaab Stadium

31 October 1989 1989 Peace and Friendship Cup	Guinea	1–0	Iraq	Kuwait City, Kuwait
	Camara 90'			Stadium: Al-Sadaqua Walsalam Stadium; Attendance: 28,000; Referee: Jawad Ashoor

3 November 1989 1989 Peace and Friendship Cup	Iraq	6–2	South Yemen	Kuwait City, Kuwait
	Radhi; Hussein; Kadhim; Fadhel		Hassan 51', 72'	Stadium: Al-Sadaqua Walsalam Stadium; Attendance: 24,800; Referee: Shuaib Mohammed

5 November 1989 1989 Peace and Friendship Cup	Iran	0–0	Iraq	Kuwait City, Kuwait
				Stadium: Al-Sadaqua Walsalam Stadium; Attendance: 30,000; Referee: Freddie Vilburg (Switzerland)

8 November 1989 1989 Peace and Friendship Cup	Iraq	2–1	Kuwait	Kuwait City, Kuwait
	Radhi 26', 90'	Report	Al-Saleh 70'	Stadium: Al-Sadaqua Walsalam Stadium; Attendance: 35,000; Referee: Jean-François Crucke (Belgium)

12 November 1989 1989 Peace and Friendship Cup	Iraq	1–1 (a.e.t.) (4–3 p)	Uganda	Kuwait City, Kuwait
	Radhi	Report	Hasule 29'	Stadium: Al-Sadaqua Walsalam Stadium; Attendance: 35,000; Referee: Kim Nielsen (Denmark)

== See also ==
- Iraq national football team results
