= Lebanon national football team results =

This article summarizes the outcomes of all official matches played by the Lebanon national football team by opponent and by period, since they first played in official competitions in 1940.

== Record per opponent ==
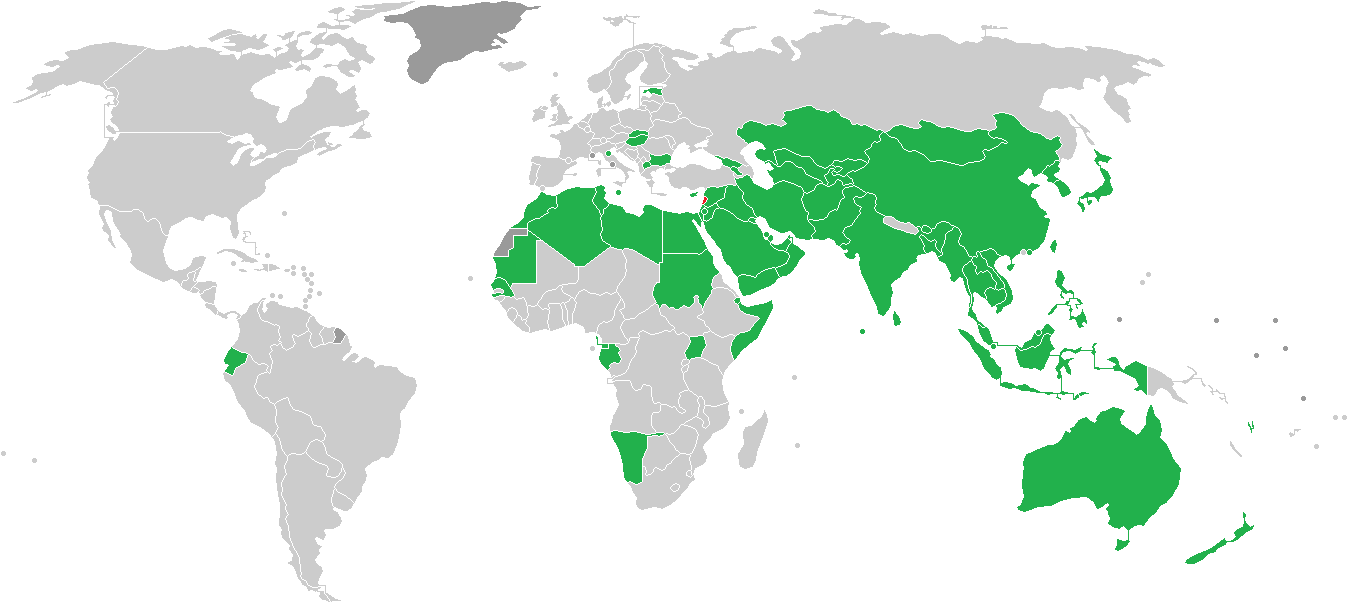
Map of opponents Lebanon has faced (8 September 2025)

Key

Positive balance (more wins than losses)
Neutral balance (as many wins as losses)
Negative balance (more losses than wins)

The following table shows Lebanon's all-time official international record per opponent:

Opponent	Pld	W	D	L	GF	GA	GD	W%	PPG (Note: According to the "three points for a win" standard)	Confederation
Afghanistan	1	1	0	0	2	0	2	100.00	3.00	AFC
Algeria	3	0	2	1	2	4	–2	0.00	0.67	CAF
Armenia	1	0	0	1	0	1	–1	0.00	0.00	UEFA
Australia	4	0	0	4	0	13	–13	0.00	0.00	AFC
Bahrain	17	2	6	9	18	30	–12	11.76	0.71	AFC
Bangladesh	6	3	2	1	12	4	8	50.00	1.83	AFC
Bhutan	3	3	0	0	10	1	9	100.00	3.00	AFC
Brunei	2	2	0	0	8	0	8	100.00	3.00	AFC
Bulgaria	1	0	0	1	2	3	–1	0.00	0.00	UEFA
Cambodia	1	1	0	0	5	1	4	100.00	3.00	AFC
China	6	0	2	4	1	13	–12	0.00	0.33	AFC
Cyprus	2	1	0	1	1	2	–1	50.00	1.50	UEFA
Djibouti	1	1	0	0	1	0	1	100.00	3.00	CAF
Ecuador	1	1	0	0	1	0	1	100.00	3.00	CONMEBOL
Egypt (Note: Includes record against the United Arab Republic)	8	0	1	7	2	20	–18	0.00	0.13	CAF
Equatorial Guinea	1	0	1	0	1	1	0	0.00	1.00	CAF
Estonia	1	1	0	0	2	0	2	100.00	3.00	UEFA
Gabon	1	0	1	0	0	0	0	0.00	1.00	CAF
Georgia	2	2	0	0	7	4	3	100.00	3.00	UEFA
Hong Kong	4	3	1	0	7	3	4	75.00	2.50	AFC
Hungary	1	0	0	1	1	4	–3	0.00	0.00	UEFA
India	9	4	4	1	12	8	4	44.44	1.78	AFC
Indonesia	1	0	1	0	0	0	0	0.00	1.00	AFC
Iran	12	1	1	10	3	31	–28	8.33	0.33	AFC
Iraq	27	2	9	16	11	51	–40	7.41	0.56	AFC
Japan	1	0	0	1	1	3	–2	0.00	0.00	AFC
Jordan	33	9	13	11	34	37	–3	27.27	1.21	AFC
Kazakhstan	2	2	0	0	5	1	4	100.00	3.00	AFC (Note: Kazakhstan was part of the Asian Football Confederation from 1992 to 2002.)
Kuwait	37	11	10	16	48	53	–5	29.73	1.16	AFC
Kyrgyzstan	4	1	2	1	4	4	0	25.00	1.25	AFC
Laos	2	2	0	0	9	0	9	100.00	3.00	AFC
Libya	6	3	0	3	9	12	–3	50.00	1.50	CAF
Macedonia	1	1	0	0	1	0	1	100.00	3.00	UEFA
Malaysia	3	2	0	1	4	3	1	66.67	2.00	AFC
Maldives	6	6	0	0	21	3	18	100.00	3.00	AFC
Malta	2	0	1	1	0	1	–1	0.00	0.50	UEFA
Mandatory Palestine	1	0	0	1	1	5	–4	0.00	0.00	N/A
Mauritania	1	0	1	0	0	0	0	0.00	1.00	CAF
Mongolia	1	0	1	0	0	0	0	0.00	1.00	AFC
Morocco	2	0	0	2	0	4	–4	0.00	0.00	CAF
Montenegro	1	0	0	1	2	3	–1	0.00	0.00	UEFA
Myanmar	3	2	1	0	6	3	3	100.00	2.33	AFC
Namibia	1	0	1	0	1	1	0	0.00	1.00	CAF
New Zealand	1	0	1	0	1	1	0	0.00	1.00	OFC
North Korea	9	5	3	1	15	6	9	55.56	2.00	AFC
Oman	14	3	5	6	12	15	–3	21.43	1.00	AFC
Pakistan	3	3	0	0	17	2	15	100.00	3.00	AFC
Palestine	11	2	7	2	13	5	8	18.18	1.18	AFC
Philippines	2	2	0	0	14	1	13	100.00	3.00	AFC
Qatar	14	0	1	13	3	41	–38	0.00	0.07	AFC
San Marino	1	0	1	0	0	0	0	0.00	1.00	UEFA
Saudi Arabia	14	4	4	6	18	20	–2	28.57	1.14	AFC
Senegal	1	1	0	0	3	2	1	100.00	3.00	CAF
Singapore	5	2	1	2	5	6	–1	40.00	1.40	AFC
Slovakia	1	1	0	0	2	1	1	100.00	3.00	UEFA
Somalia	1	1	0	0	4	0	4	100.00	3.00	CAF
South Korea	16	1	3	12	5	28	–23	6.25	0.38	AFC
Sri Lanka	5	4	0	1	18	6	12	80.00	2.40	AFC
Sudan	6	1	2	3	3	7	–4	16.067	0.83	CAF
Syria	29	5	5	19	31	59	–28	17.24	0.69	AFC
Taiwan	2	2	0	0	7	2	5	100.00	3.00	OFC (Note: Taiwan was part of the Oceania Football Confederation from 1975 to 1989.)
Tajikistan	2	1	0	1	2	2	0	50.00	1.50	AFC
Thailand	10	3	3	4	18	15	3	30.00	1.20	AFC
Timor-Leste	1	1	0	0	4	0	4	100.00	3.00	AFC
Tunisia	6	2	1	3	2	5	–3	20.00	1.17	CAF
Turkmenistan	4	3	0	1	8	5	3	75.00	2.25	AFC
United Arab Emirates	15	1	4	10	14	27	–13	6.67	0.47	AFC
Uganda	1	0	0	1	0	2	–2	0.00	0.00	CAF
Uzbekistan	6	0	2	4	1	8	–7	0.00	0.33	AFC
Vanuatu	1	1	0	0	3	1	2	100.00	3.00	OFC
Vietnam (Note: Includes record against South Vietnam)	5	1	3	1	5	5	0	20.00	1.20	AFC
Yemen	5	2	1	2	7	7	0	40.00	1.40	AFC
Total	413	119	107	187	496	611	–115	28.81	1.12	—

Last updated: Lebanon vs Palestine, 17 November 2026.

== Results in chronological order ==
The summarizing tables below show Lebanon's official matches per period. More extensive reports (with dates, scores, goal scorers and match circumstances) can be found on the main articles per period.

	Legend for encounters
Q	Qualification
PR	Preliminary round
QR	Qualifying round
R + number	Round number
GS	Group stage
SF	Semi-final
3rd–4th	Third-place match
F	Final

=== 1940–1989 ===
Results list Lebanon's goal tally first.

1940–1989
Win Draw Defeat
M	Date	Opponent	Result	Event
1	1940-04-27	Mandatory Palestine	1–5	Friendly
2	1942-04-26	Syria	1–2	Friendly
3	1947-05-04	Syria	1–4	Friendly
4	1947-05-18	Syria	0–1	Friendly
5	1953-08-03	Jordan	1–4	(Egypt) 1953 Arab Games GS
6	1953-08-06	Syria	0–0	(Egypt) 1953 Arab Games GS
7	1953-08-08	Palestine	9–1	(Egypt) 1953 Arab Games GS
8	1955-01-23	Bulgaria	2–3	Friendly
9	1956-02-29	Hungary	1–4	Friendly
10	1957-10-18	Saudi Arabia	1–1	(Lebanon) 1957 Arab Games GS
11	1957-10-20	Syria	1–1	(Lebanon) 1957 Arab Games GS
12	1957-10-22	Jordan	6–3	(Lebanon) 1957 Arab Games GS
13	1957-10-24	Tunisia	2–4	(Lebanon) 1957 Arab Games SF
14	1959-11-15	Iraq	0–3	(Italy) 1960 Olympics Q
15	1959-11-25	Iraq	0–8	(Italy) 1960 Olympics Q
16	1961-08-27	Libya	2–3	(Morocco) 1961 Arab Games GS
17	1961-08-29	United Arab Republic	0–4	(Morocco) 1961 Arab Games GS
18	1961-08-31	Kuwait	4–1	(Morocco) 1961 Arab Games GS
19	1961-09-03	Morocco	0–1	(Morocco) 1961 Arab Games GS
20	1961-09-05	Saudi Arabia	7–1	(Morocco) 1961 Arab Games GS
21	1962-01-26	Kuwait	5–0	Friendly
22	1962-01-29	Kuwait	3–0	Friendly
23	1963-03-31	Kuwait	6–0	(Lebanon) 1963 Arab Cup GS
24	1963-04-04	Syria	2–3	(Lebanon) 1963 Arab Cup GS
25	1963-04-06	Jordan	5–0	(Lebanon) 1963 Arab Cup GS
26	1963-04-07	Tunisia	0–1	(Lebanon) 1963 Arab Cup GS
27	1963-06-06	Tunisia	4–2	Friendly
28	1963-06-09	Tunisia	0–2	Friendly
29	1963-09-26	United Arab Republic	0–2	(Italy) 1963 Mediterranean Games GS
30	1964-03-08	Libya	1–0	(Libya) 1964 Tripoli Fair Tournament GS
31	1964-11-13	Jordan	0–0	(Kuwait) 1964 Arab Cup GS
32	1964-11-15	Iraq	0–1	(Kuwait) 1964 Arab Cup GS
33	1964-11-18	Libya	1–2	(Kuwait) 1964 Arab Cup GS
34	1964-11-20	Kuwait	3–2	(Kuwait) 1964 Arab Cup GS
35	1965-03-20	Cyprus	0–2	Friendly
36	1965-09-03	Palestine	0–1	(United Arab Republic) 1965 Arab Games GS
37	1965-09-04	United Arab Republic	0–3	(United Arab Republic) 1965 Arab Games GS
38	1965-09-06	Iraq	0–0	(United Arab Republic) 1965 Arab Games GS
39	1966-04-02	Bahrain	6–1	(Iraq) 1966 Arab Cup GS
40	1966-04-03	Kuwait	2–1	(Iraq) 1966 Arab Cup GS
41	1966-04-05	Jordan	2–1	(Iraq) 1966 Arab Cup GS
42	1966-04-07	Iraq	0–0	(Iraq) 1966 Arab Cup GS
43	1966-04-09	Syria	0–1	(Iraq) 1966 Arab Cup SF
44	1966-04-10	Libya	1–6	(Iraq) 1966 Arab Cup 3rd–4th
45	1966-06-05	Senegal	3–2	Friendly
46	1967-09-28	South Vietnam	1–1	(Mexico) 1968 Olympics Q
47	1967-10-01	South Korea	0–2	(Mexico) 1968 Olympics Q
48	1967-10-03	Japan	1–3	(Mexico) 1968 Olympics Q
49	1967-10-06	Philippines	11–1	(Mexico) 1968 Olympics Q
50	1967-10-09	Taiwan	5–2	(Mexico) 1968 Olympics Q
51	1970-07-07	Sudan	0–2	(Libya) 1970 Al-Jalaa Tournament GS
52	1971-06-20	Iraq	1–0	(West Germany) 1972 Olympics Q
53	1971-07-14	Iraq	0–1	(West Germany) 1972 Olympics Q
54	1971-09-19	Iraq	1–2	(West Germany) 1972 Olympics Q
55	1971-12-11	Bahrain	0–3	(Thailand) 1972 Asian Cup Q R1
56	1971-12-14	Kuwait	0–1	(Thailand) 1972 Asian Cup Q R2
57	1971-12-19	Syria	3–2	(Thailand) 1972 Asian Cup Q R2
58	1971-12-22	Iraq	1–4	(Thailand) 1972 Asian Cup Q SF
59	1971-12-24	Jordan	2–0	(Thailand) 1972 Asian Cup Q 3rd–4th
60	1974-09-29	Tunisia	2–1	(Syria) 1974 Kuneitra Cup GS
61	1974-10-01	Jordan	0–0	(Syria) 1974 Kuneitra Cup GS
62	1974-10-03	Morocco	0–3	(Syria) 1974 Kuneitra Cup GS
63	1974-10-05	Egypt	0–2	(Syria) 1974 Kuneitra Cup GS
64	1975-05-16	South Korea	0–1	(South Korea) 1975 President's Cup GS
65	1975-05-25	Taiwan	2–0	Friendly
66	1975-05-27	Thailand	2–1	Friendly
67	1979-11-16	United Arab Emirates	0–0	(Kuwait) 1980 Asian Cup Q
68	1979-11-22	Syria	0–1	(Kuwait) 1980 Asian Cup Q
69	1985-03-15	Iraq	0–6	(Mexico) 1986 World Cup Q R1
70	1985-03-18	Iraq	0–6	(Mexico) 1986 World Cup Q R1
71	1985-03-22	Qatar	0–7	(Mexico) 1986 World Cup Q R1
72	1985-03-25	Bahrain	0–6	Friendly
73	1985-03-27	Qatar	0–8	(Mexico) 1986 World Cup Q R1
74	1987-09-16	San Marino	0–0	(Syria) 1987 Mediterranean Games GS
75	1987-09-20	Syria	1–6	(Syria) 1987 Mediterranean Games GS
76	1988-04-11	Syria	1–2	(Jordan) 1988 Arab Cup Q
77	1988-04-13	Palestine	0–0	(Jordan) 1988 Arab Cup Q
78	1988-07-03	Jordan	0–1	Friendly
79	1988-07-06	Kuwait	0–1	Friendly
80	1988-07-11	Iraq	0–0	(Jordan) 1988 Arab Cup GS
81	1988-07-13	Saudi Arabia	1–0	(Jordan) 1988 Arab Cup GS
82	1988-07-15	Egypt	0–3	(Jordan) 1988 Arab Cup GS
83	1988-07-17	Tunisia	1–1	(Jordan) 1988 Arab Cup GS
84	1989-10-30	Kuwait	0–5	(Kuwait) 1989 Peace and Friendship Cup GS
85	1989-11-02	Uganda	0–2	(Kuwait) 1989 Peace and Friendship Cup GS

=== 1990–1999 ===
Results list Lebanon's goal tally first.

1990–1999
Win Draw Defeat
M	Date	Opponent	Result	Event
86	1993-01-20	Kuwait	0–2	Friendly
87	1993-03-17	Qatar	0–3	Friendly
88	1993-03-19	Qatar	0–2	Friendly
89	1993-03-26	Jordan	1–0	Friendly
90	1993-05-07	India	2–2	(United States) 1994 World Cup Q R1
91	1993-05-09	Hong Kong	2–2	(United States) 1994 World Cup Q R1
92	1993-05-11	South Korea	0–1	(United States) 1994 World Cup Q R1
93	1993-05-13	Bahrain	0–0	(United States) 1994 World Cup Q R1
94	1993-05-17	Jordan	1–3	Friendly
95	1993-06-05	Bahrain	0–0	(United States) 1994 World Cup Q R1
96	1993-06-07	South Korea	0–2	(United States) 1994 World Cup Q R1
97	1993-06-09	Hong Kong	2–1	(United States) 1994 World Cup Q R1
98	1993-06-11	India	2–1	(United States) 1994 World Cup Q R1
99	1995-12-06	Slovakia	2–1	Friendly
100	1996-01-03	Kazakhstan	2–1	Friendly
101	1996-01-16	Cyprus	1–0	Friendly
102	1996-02-11	Ecuador	1–0	Friendly
103	1996-05-12	Turkmenistan	3–1	(United Arab Emirates) 1996 Asian Cup Q
104	1996-05-26	Turkmenistan	1–0	(United Arab Emirates) 1996 Asian Cup Q
105	1996-06-09	Kuwait	3–5	(United Arab Emirates) 1996 Asian Cup Q
106	1996-06-20	Kuwait	0–0	(United Arab Emirates) 1996 Asian Cup Q
107	1996-09-05	Oman	1–2	Friendly
108	1996-09-08	Oman	2–1	Friendly
109	1996-10-03	Bahrain	2–3	Friendly
110	1996-10-09	New Zealand	1–1	Friendly
111	1996-11-13	Iran	0–0	Friendly
112	1996-12-05	Georgia	4–2	Friendly
113	1996-12-08	Georgia	3–2	Friendly
114	1997-01-12	Algeria	2–2	Friendly
115	1997-01-26	Estonia	2–0	Friendly
116	1997-02-02	Jordan	1–0	Friendly
117	1997-02-07	Jordan	0–0	Friendly
118	1997-03-19	United Arab Emirates	1–2	Friendly
119	1997-04-13	Singapore	1–1	(France) 1998 World Cup Q R1
120	1997-04-27	Libya	2–0	Friendly
121	1997-05-08	Kuwait	0–2	(France) 1998 World Cup Q R1
122	1997-05-24	Singapore	2–1	(France) 1998 World Cup Q R1
123	1997-06-22	Kuwait	1–3	(France) 1998 World Cup Q R1
124	1997-07-13	Jordan	1–1	(Lebanon) 1997 Arab Games GS
125	1997-07-16	Oman	1–1	(Lebanon) 1997 Arab Games GS
126	1997-07-19	Libya	2–1	(Lebanon) 1997 Arab Games GS
127	1997-07-24	Syria	2–3	(Lebanon) 1997 Arab Games SF
128	1997-07-27	Kuwait	3–1	(Lebanon) 1997 Arab Games 3rd–4th
129	1997-08-21	Iraq	0–2	Friendly
130	1998-07-20	Palestine	3–1	(Qatar) 1998 Arab Cup Q
131	1998-07-23	Jordan	0–2	(Qatar) 1998 Arab Cup Q
132	1998-07-26	Syria	0–1	(Qatar) 1998 Arab Cup Q
133	1998-08-18	Armenia	0–1	Friendly
134	1998-09-09	Kuwait	0–0	Friendly
135	1998-09-23	Algeria	0–0	(Qatar) 1998 Arab Cup GS
136	1998-09-27	Saudi Arabia	1–4	(Qatar) 1998 Arab Cup GS
137	1998-10-17	Syria	3–3	(United Arab Emirates) 1998 Friendship Tournament GS
138	1998-10-19	Sudan	1–1	(United Arab Emirates) 1998 Friendship Tournament GS
139	1998-10-21	United Arab Emirates	0–1	(United Arab Emirates) 1998 Friendship Tournament GS
140	1998-11-18	Iraq	0–2	Friendly
141	1998-11-30	China	1–4	(Thailand) 1998 Asian Games R1
142	1998-12-04	Cambodia	5–1	(Thailand) 1998 Asian Games R1
143	1998-12-08	Qatar	0–1	(Thailand) 1998 Asian Games R2
144	1998-12-10	Thailand	0–1	(Thailand) 1998 Asian Games R2
145	1998-12-12	Kazakhstan	3–0	(Thailand) 1998 Asian Games R2
146	1999-08-16	Saudi Arabia	2–1	(Jordan) 1999 Arab Games GS R1
147	1999-08-20	United Arab Emirates	0–2	(Jordan) 1999 Arab Games GS R1
148	1999-08-23	Jordan	3–1	(Jordan) 1999 Arab Games GS R2
149	1999-08-25	Oman	1–1	(Jordan) 1999 Arab Games GS R2
150	1999-08-27	Iraq	0–4	(Jordan) 1999 Arab Games GS R2
151	1999-11-24	Malta	0–0	Friendly
152	1999-12-15	Malta	0–1	Friendly

=== 2000–2009 ===
Results list Lebanon's goal tally first.

2000–2009
Win Draw Defeat
M	Date	Opponent	Result	Event
153	2000-02-16	North Korea	1–0	Friendly
154	2000-02-23	Jordan	1–1	Friendly
155	2000-03-08	Jordan	1–1	Friendly
156	2000-05-13	Jordan	1–1	Friendly
157	2000-05-21	Saudi Arabia	0–0	Friendly
158	2000-05-23	Iraq	1–2	(Jordan) 2000 WAFF Championship GS
159	2000-05-25	Kyrgyzstan	2–0	(Jordan) 2000 WAFF Championship GS
160	2000-05-27	Jordan	0–0	(Jordan) 2000 WAFF Championship GS
161	2000-06-25	Kuwait	3–1	Friendly
162	2000-08-05	Oman	3–1	Friendly
163	2000-08-08	Oman	1–2	Friendly
164	2000-09-07	United Arab Emirates	0–1	Friendly
165	2000-09-10	United Arab Emirates	2–2	Friendly
166	2000-10-12	Iran	0–4	(Lebanon) 2000 Asian Cup GS
167	2000-10-15	Iraq	2–2	(Lebanon) 2000 Asian Cup GS
168	2000-10-18	Thailand	1–1	(Lebanon) 2000 Asian Cup GS
169	2001-01-31	Iraq	0–0	Friendly
170	2001-03-07	Syria	2–2	Friendly
171	2001-04-04	Bahrain	1–1	Friendly
172	2001-04-25	Philippines	3–0	Friendly
173	2001-05-13	Pakistan	6–0	(South Korea) (Japan) 2002 World Cup Q R1
174	2001-05-15	Sri Lanka	4–0	(South Korea) (Japan) 2002 World Cup Q R1
175	2001-05-17	Thailand	1–2	(South Korea) (Japan) 2002 World Cup Q R1
176	2001-05-26	Pakistan	8–1	(South Korea) (Japan) 2002 World Cup Q R1
177	2001-05-28	Sri Lanka	5–0	(South Korea) (Japan) 2002 World Cup Q R1
178	2001-05-30	Thailand	2–2	(South Korea) (Japan) 2002 World Cup Q R1
179	2002-09-01	Jordan	0–1	(Syria) 2002 WAFF Championship GS
180	2002-09-03	Iran	0–2	(Syria) 2002 WAFF Championship GS
181	2002-12-13	Saudi Arabia	1–1	Friendly
182	2002-12-19	Saudi Arabia	0–1	(Kuwait) 2002 Arab Cup GS
183	2002-12-21	Syria	1–4	(Kuwait) 2002 Arab Cup GS
184	2002-12-24	Yemen	4–2	(Kuwait) 2002 Arab Cup GS
185	2002-12-26	Bahrain	0–0	(Kuwait) 2002 Arab Cup GS
186	2003-08-22	Syria	1–0	Friendly
187	2003-09-04	North Korea	1–0	(China) 2004 Asian Cup Q
188	2003-09-19	Bahrain	3–4	Friendly
189	2003-10-17	Jordan	0–1	(China) 2004 Asian Cup Q
190	2003-11-03	North Korea	1–1	(China) 2004 Asian Cup Q
191	2003-11-12	Jordan	0–2	(China) 2004 Asian Cup Q
192	2003-11-19	Iran	0–3	(China) 2004 Asian Cup Q
193	2003-11-28	Iran	0–1	(China) 2004 Asian Cup Q
194	2003-12-16	Kuwait	0–2	Friendly
195	2003-12-18	Kuwait	0–0	Friendly
196	2004-02-08	Bahrain	2–1	Friendly
197	2004-02-18	South Korea	0–2	(Germany) 2006 World Cup Q R2
198	2004-03-23	Syria	0–1	Friendly
199	2004-03-31	Vietnam	2–0	(Germany) 2006 World Cup Q R2
200	2004-05-26	Bahrain	2–2	Friendly
201	2004-06-09	Maldives	3–0	(Germany) 2006 World Cup Q R2
202	2004-06-17	Iran	0–4	(Iran) 2004 WAFF Championship GS
203	2004-06-19	Syria	1–3	(Iran) 2004 WAFF Championship GS
204	2004-07-03	China	0–6	Friendly
205	2004-08-31	Jordan	2–2	Friendly
206	2004-09-08	Maldives	5–2	(Germany) 2006 World Cup Q R2
207	2004-10-03	Kuwait	1–3	Friendly
208	2004-10-06	Kuwait	1–1	Friendly
209	2004-10-13	South Korea	1–1	(Germany) 2006 World Cup Q R2
210	2004-11-17	Vietnam	0–0	(Germany) 2006 World Cup Q R2
211	2004-12-01	Qatar	1–4	Friendly
212	2005-02-02	Bahrain	1–2	Friendly
213	2006-01-27	Saudi Arabia	2–1	Friendly
214	2006-02-22	Kuwait	1–1	(Indonesia) (Malaysia) (Thailand) (Vietnam) 2007 Asian Cup Q
215	2006-12-20	Mauritania	0–0	(Arab League) 2009 Arab Cup Q
216	2006-12-23	Somalia	4–0	(Arab League) 2009 Arab Cup Q
217	2006-12-26	Sudan	0–0	(Arab League) 2009 Arab Cup Q
218	2007-06-16	Syria	0–1	(Jordan) 2007 WAFF Championship GS
219	2007-06-20	Jordan	0–3	(Jordan) 2007 WAFF Championship GS
220	2007-09-23	United Arab Emirates	1–1	Friendly
221	2007-10-08	India	4–1	(South Africa) 2010 World Cup Q R1
222	2007-10-30	India	2–2	(South Africa) 2010 World Cup Q R1
223	2008-01-02	Kuwait	2–3	Friendly
224	2008-01-20	China	0–0	Friendly
225	2008-01-28	Jordan	1–4	Friendly
226	2008-02-06	Uzbekistan	0–1	(South Africa) 2010 World Cup Q R3
227	2008-03-26	Singapore	0–2	(South Africa) 2010 World Cup Q R3
228	2008-04-09	Maldives	4–0	(Qatar) 2011 Asian Cup Q PR
229	2008-04-23	Maldives	2–1	(Qatar) 2011 Asian Cup Q PR
230	2008-05-27	Qatar	1–2	Friendly
231	2008-06-02	Saudi Arabia	1–4	(South Africa) 2010 World Cup Q R3
232	2008-06-07	Saudi Arabia	1–2	(South Africa) 2010 World Cup Q R3
233	2008-06-14	Uzbekistan	0–3	(South Africa) 2010 World Cup Q R3
234	2008-06-22	Singapore	1–2	(South Africa) 2010 World Cup Q R3
235	2009-01-14	Vietnam	1–3	(Qatar) 2011 Asian Cup Q QR
236	2009-01-21	Thailand	1–2	(Thailand) 2009 King's Cup SF
237	2009-01-23	North Korea	1–0	(Thailand) 2009 King's Cup 3rd–4th
238	2009-01-28	Syria	0–2	(Qatar) 2011 Asian Cup Q QR
239	2009-04-01	Namibia	1–1	Friendly
240	2009-08-19	India	1–0	(India) 2009 Nehru Cup GS
241	2009-08-22	Sri Lanka	3–4	(India) 2009 Nehru Cup GS
242	2009-08-25	Kyrgyzstan	1–1	(India) 2009 Nehru Cup GS
243	2009-08-27	Syria	0–1	(India) 2009 Nehru Cup GS
244	2009-11-14	China	0–2	(Qatar) 2011 Asian Cup Q QR
245	2009-11-22	China	0–1	(Qatar) 2011 Asian Cup Q QR

=== 2010–2019 ===
Results list Lebanon's goal tally first.

2010–2019
Win Draw Defeat
M	Date	Opponent	Result	Event
246	2010-01-06	Vietnam	1–1	(Qatar) 2011 Asian Cup Q QR
247	2010-03-03	Syria	0–4	(Qatar) 2011 Asian Cup Q QR
248	2011-07-02	Kuwait	0–6	Friendly
249	2011-07-09	Oman	0–1	Friendly
250	2011-07-17	United Arab Emirates	2–6	Friendly
251	2011-07-23	Bangladesh	4–0	(Brazil) 2014 World Cup Q R2
252	2011-07-28	Bangladesh	0–2	(Brazil) 2014 World Cup Q R2
253	2011-08-17	Syria	2–3	Friendly
254	2011-09-02	South Korea	0–6	(Brazil) 2014 World Cup Q R3
255	2011-09-06	United Arab Emirates	3–1	(Brazil) 2014 World Cup Q R3
256	2011-10-11	Kuwait	2–2	(Brazil) 2014 World Cup Q R3
257	2011-11-06	Iraq	0–1	Friendly
258	2011-11-11	Kuwait	1–0	(Brazil) 2014 World Cup Q R3
259	2011-11-15	South Korea	2–1	(Brazil) 2014 World Cup Q R3
260	2012-01-22	Iraq	1–0	Friendly
261	2012-02-29	United Arab Emirates	2–4	(Brazil) 2014 World Cup Q R3
262	2012-05-11	Egypt	1–4	Friendly
263	2012-05-18	Jordan	1–2	Friendly
264	2012-05-27	Oman	1–1	Friendly
265	2012-06-03	Qatar	0–1	(Brazil) 2014 World Cup Q R4
266	2012-06-08	Uzbekistan	1–1	(Brazil) 2014 World Cup Q R4
267	2012-06-12	South Korea	0–3	(Brazil) 2014 World Cup Q R4
268	2012-06-24	Iraq	0–1	(Saudi Arabia) 2012 Arab Cup GS
269	2012-06-27	Sudan	0–2	(Saudi Arabia) 2012 Arab Cup GS
270	2012-06-30	Egypt	1–1	(Saudi Arabia) 2012 Arab Cup GS
271	2012-09-06	Australia	0–3	Friendly
272	2012-09-11	Iran	1–0	(Brazil) 2014 World Cup Q R4
273	2012-10-16	Yemen	2–1	Friendly
274	2012-11-14	Qatar	0–1	(Brazil) 2014 World Cup Q R4
275	2012-12-08	Oman	1–0	(Kuwait) 2012 WAFF Championship GS
276	2012-12-11	Palestine	0–1	(Kuwait) 2012 WAFF Championship GS
277	2012-12-14	Kuwait	1–2	(Kuwait) 2012 WAFF Championship GS
278	2013-01-15	Gabon	0–0	Friendly
279	2013-01-31	Qatar	0–1	Friendly
280	2013-02-06	Iran	0–5	(Australia) 2015 Asian Cup Q
281	2013-03-17	Bahrain	0–0	Friendly
282	2013-03-22	Thailand	5–2	(Australia) 2015 Asian Cup Q
283	2013-03-26	Uzbekistan	0–1	(Brazil) 2014 World Cup Q R4
284	2013-05-29	Oman	1–1	Friendly
285	2013-06-04	South Korea	1–1	(Brazil) 2014 World Cup Q R4
286	2013-06-11	Iran	0–4	(Brazil) 2014 World Cup Q R4
287	2013-09-06	Syria	2–0	Friendly
288	2013-09-09	Qatar	1–1	Friendly
289	2013-10-08	Iraq	1–1	Friendly
290	2013-10-15	Kuwait	1–1	(Australia) 2015 Asian Cup Q
291	2013-11-09	Bahrain	0–1	Friendly
292	2013-11-15	Kuwait	0–0	(Australia) 2015 Asian Cup Q
293	2013-11-19	Iran	1–4	(Australia) 2015 Asian Cup Q
294	2013-12-26	Jordan	0–0	(Qatar) 2013 WAFF Championship GS
295	2013-12-29	Kuwait	0–2	(Qatar) 2013 WAFF Championship GS
296	2014-02-19	Pakistan	3–1	Friendly
297	2014-03-05	Thailand	5–2	(Australia) 2015 Asian Cup Q
298	2014-10-09	Qatar	0–5	Friendly
299	2014-10-14	Saudi Arabia	1–1	Friendly
300	2014-11-06	United Arab Emirates	2–3	Friendly
301	2015-05-24	Syria	2–2	Friendly
302	2015-05-30	Jordan	0–0	Friendly
303	2015-06-11	Kuwait	0–1	(Russia) 2018 World Cup Q R2
304	2015-06-16	Laos	2–0	(Russia) 2018 World Cup Q R2
305	2015-08-26	Iraq	2–3	Friendly
306	2015-08-31	Palestine	0–0	Friendly
307	2015-09-08	South Korea	0–3	(Russia) 2018 World Cup Q R2
308	2015-10-08	Myanmar	2–0	(Russia) 2018 World Cup Q R2
309	2015-10-13	Kuwait	0–0	(Russia) 2018 World Cup Q R2
310	2015-11-12	Laos	7–0	(Russia) 2018 World Cup Q R2
311	2015-11-17	Macedonia	1–0	Friendly
312	2016-02-05	Bahrain	0–2	Friendly
313	2016-02-14	Uzbekistan	0–2	Friendly
314	2016-03-24	South Korea	0–1	(Russia) 2018 World Cup Q R2
315	2016-03-29	Myanmar	1–1	(Russia) 2018 World Cup Q R2
316	2016-08-31	Jordan	1–1	Friendly
317	2016-09-05	Afghanistan	2–0	Friendly
318	2016-10-06	Kyrgyzstan	0–0	Friendly
319	2016-10-11	Equatorial Guinea	1–1	Friendly
320	2016-11-10	Palestine	1–1	Friendly
321	2016-11-15	Jordan	0–0	Friendly
322	2017-03-28	Hong Kong	2–0	(United Arab Emirates) 2019 Asian Cup Q R3
323	2017-06-13	Malaysia	2–1	(United Arab Emirates) 2019 Asian Cup Q R3
324	2017-09-05	North Korea	2–2	(United Arab Emirates) 2019 Asian Cup Q R3
325	2017-10-10	North Korea	5–0	(United Arab Emirates) 2019 Asian Cup Q R3
326	2017-11-09	Singapore	1–0	Friendly
327	2017-11-14	Hong Kong	1–0	(United Arab Emirates) 2019 Asian Cup Q R3
328	2018-03-27	Malaysia	2–1	(United Arab Emirates) 2019 Asian Cup Q R3
329	2018-09-06	Jordan	1–0	Friendly
330	2018-09-09	Oman	0–0	Friendly
331	2018-10-11	Kuwait	0–1	Friendly
332	2018-11-15	Uzbekistan	0–0	Friendly
333	2018-11-20	Australia	0–3	Friendly
334	2018-12-27	Bahrain	0–1	Friendly
335	2019-01-09	Qatar	0–2	(United Arab Emirates) 2019 Asian Cup GS
336	2019-01-12	Saudi Arabia	0–2	(United Arab Emirates) 2019 Asian Cup GS
337	2019-01-17	North Korea	4–1	(United Arab Emirates) 2019 Asian Cup GS
338	2019-07-30	Iraq	0–1	(Iraq) 2019 WAFF Championship GS
339	2019-08-02	Syria	2–1	(Iraq) 2019 WAFF Championship GS
340	2019-08-05	Palestine	0–0	(Iraq) 2019 WAFF Championship GS
341	2019-08-08	Yemen	1–2	(Iraq) 2019 WAFF Championship GS
342	2019-09-05	North Korea	0–2	(Qatar) 2022 World Cup Q R2
343	2019-09-10	Oman	0–1	Friendly
344	2019-10-10	Turkmenistan	2–1	(Qatar) 2022 World Cup Q R2
345	2019-10-15	Sri Lanka	3–0	(Qatar) 2022 World Cup Q R2
346	2019-11-14	South Korea	0–0	(Qatar) 2022 World Cup Q R2
347	2019-11-19	North Korea	0–0	(Qatar) 2022 World Cup Q R2

=== 2020–present ===
Results list Lebanon's goal tally first.

2020–present
Win Draw Defeat
M	Date	Opponent	Result	Event
348	2020-11-12	Bahrain	1–3	Friendly
349	2021-03-24	Jordan	0–1	Friendly
350	2021-03-29	Kuwait	1–1	Friendly
351	2021-06-05	Sri Lanka	3–2	(Qatar) 2022 World Cup Q R2
352	2021-06-09	Turkmenistan	2–3	(Qatar) 2022 World Cup Q R2
353	2021-06-13	South Korea	1–2	(Qatar) 2022 World Cup Q R2
354	2021-06-23	Djibouti	1–0	(Qatar) 2021 Arab Cup Q
355	2021-09-02	United Arab Emirates	0–0	(Qatar) 2022 World Cup Q R3
356	2021-09-07	South Korea	0–1	(Qatar) 2022 World Cup Q R3
357	2021-10-07	Iraq	0–0	(Qatar) 2022 World Cup Q R3
358	2021-10-12	Syria	3–2	(Qatar) 2022 World Cup Q R3
359	2021-11-11	Iran	1–2	(Qatar) 2022 World Cup Q R3
360	2021-11-16	United Arab Emirates	0–1	(Qatar) 2022 World Cup Q R3
361	2021-12-01	Egypt	0–1	(Qatar) 2021 Arab Cup GS
362	2021-12-04	Algeria	0–2	(Qatar) 2021 Arab Cup GS
363	2021-12-07	Sudan	1–0	(Qatar) 2021 Arab Cup GS
364	2022-01-27	South Korea	0–1	(Qatar) 2022 World Cup Q R3
365	2022-02-01	Iraq	1–1	(Qatar) 2022 World Cup Q R3
366	2022-03-24	Syria	0–3	(Qatar) 2022 World Cup Q R3
367	2022-03-29	Iran	0–2	(Qatar) 2022 World Cup Q R3
368	2022-11-19	Kuwait	0–2	Friendly
369	2022-12-30	United Arab Emirates	0–1	Friendly
370	2023-03-27	Oman	0–2	Friendly
371	2023-06-09	Vanuatu	3–1	(India) 2023 Intercontinental Cup GS
372	2023-06-12	Mongolia	0–0	(India) 2023 Intercontinental Cup GS
373	2023-06-15	India	0–0	(India) 2023 Intercontinental Cup GS
374	2023-06-18	India	0–2	(India) 2023 Intercontinental Cup F
375	2023-06-22	Bangladesh	2–0	(India) 2023 SAFF Championship GS
376	2023-06-25	Bhutan	4–1	(India) 2023 SAFF Championship GS
377	2023-06-28	Maldives	1–0	(India) 2023 SAFF Championship GS
378	2023-07-01	India	0–0	(India) 2023 SAFF Championship SF
379	2023-09-07	Thailand	1–2	(Thailand) 2023 King's Cup SF
380	2023-09-10	India	1–0	(Thailand) 2023 King's Cup 3rd
381	2023-10-12	Montenegro	2–3	Friendly
382	2023-10-17	United Arab Emirates	1–2	Friendly
383	2023-11-16	Palestine	0–0	(Canada) (United States) (Mexico) 2026 World Cup Q R2
384	2023-11-21	Bangladesh	1–1	(Canada) (United States) (Mexico) 2026 World Cup Q R2
385	2023-12-28	Jordan	2–1	Friendly
386	2024-01-04	Saudi Arabia	0–1	Friendly
387	2024-01-12	Qatar	0–3	(Qatar) 2023 Asian Cup GS
388	2024-01-17	China	0–0	(Qatar) 2023 Asian Cup GS
389	2024-01-22	Tajikistan	1–2	(Qatar) 2023 Asian Cup GS
390	2024-03-21	Australia	0–2	(Canada) (United States) (Mexico) 2026 World Cup Q R2
391	2024-03-26	Australia	0–5	(Canada) (United States) (Mexico) 2026 World Cup Q R2
392	2024-06-06	Palestine	0–0	(Canada) (United States) (Mexico) 2026 World Cup Q R2
393	2024-06-11	Bangladesh	4–0	(Canada) (United States) (Mexico) 2026 World Cup Q R2
394	2024-09-04	Tajikistan	1–0	(Malaysia) 2024 Merdeka Tournament SF
395	2024-09-08	Malaysia	0–1	(Malaysia) 2024 Merdeka Tournament F
396	2024-11-14	Thailand	0–0	Friendly
397	2024-11-19	Myanmar	3–2	Friendly
398	2024-12-12	Kuwait	2–1	Friendly
399	2024-12-15	Kuwait	2–0	Friendly
400	2025-03-20	Timor-Leste	4–0	Friendly
401	2025-03-25	Brunei	5–0	(Saudi Arabia) 2027 Asian Cup Q R3
402	2025-05-28	Oman	0–1	Friendly
403	2025-06-10	Yemen	0–0	(Saudi Arabia) 2027 Asian Cup Q R3
404	2025-09-08	Indonesia	0–0	Friendly
405	2025-10-09	Bhutan	2–0	(Saudi Arabia) 2027 Asian Cup Q R3
406	2025-10-14	Bhutan	4–0	(Saudi Arabia) 2027 Asian Cup Q R3
407	2025-11-18	Brunei	3–0	(Saudi Arabia) 2027 Asian Cup Q R3
408	2025-11-26	Sudan	1–2	(Qatar) 2025 Arab Cup Q
409	2026-06-04	Yemen	0–2	(Saudi Arabia) 2027 Asian Cup Q R3
410	2026-10-01	Maldives	6–0	Friendly
411	2026-10-04	Kyrgyzstan	1–3	Friendly
412	2026-11-13	Iraq	0–0	(Iraq) 2026 Basra Tournament
413	2026-11-17	Palestine	0–0	(Iraq) 2026 Basra Tournament

== See also ==
- Lebanon women's national football team results
- Lebanon national football team records and statistics
- List of Lebanon national football team managers
