= 1988 Arab Cup final =

- Event: 1988 Arab Cup
Iraq	Syria
(Iraq)	(Syria)
1	1
- Iraq won 4–3 on penalties
- Date: 21 July 1988
- Venue: Amman International Stadium, Amman
- Man of the Match: Basil Gorgis (Iraq)
- Referee: Abdelali Naciri (Morocco)
- Attendance: 15,000
- Weather: Clear

The 1988 Arab Cup final was a football match that took place on 21 July 1988, at the Amman International Stadium in Amman, Jordan, to determine the winner of the 1988 Arab Cup. Iraq defeated Syria 4–3 on penalties after a draw 1–1 in regulation and extra time to win their fourth Arab Cup.

This victory marked Iraq's dominance in Arab football during the 1980s, having previously won three Arab Cups. Basil Gorgis was instrumental in Iraq’s success, scoring their goal and converting his penalty in the shootout. The final also showcased Syria’s resilience, with Walid Al-Nasser scoring their only goal in the match.

== Road to the final ==
Both teams showed exceptional performances during the tournament, with Iraq finishing first in their group and defeating host Jordan in the semi-finals, while Syria reached the final after a dramatic penalty shootout win against Egypt.

Iraq		Syria	
Opponents	Results	Opponents	Results
Group stage
Tunisia	1–1	Algeria UT	1–1
Lebanon	0–0	Bahrain	2–1
Saudi Arabia Ol.	2–0	Kuwait Ol.	1–0
Egypt	0–0	Jordan	0–2
Semi-finals
Jordan	3–0	Egypt	0–0 (4–3 p)

== Match ==
The final was a closely contested affair, with both teams scoring in the first half. Walid Al-Nasser gave Syria the lead in the 33rd minute, but Iraq’s Basil Gorgis equalized just a minute later. The match remained level through extra time, and the result was decided via penalties, where Iraq triumphed 4–3.

=== Key Moments ===
- 33rd minute: Walid Al-Nasser opened the scoring with a header off a corner kick. - 34th minute: Basil Gorgis quickly responded with a powerful shot from outside the box. - Penalty shootout: Iraq’s players converted four penalties, with Samir Shaker and Laith Hussein among the scorers. Syria missed two crucial penalties, sealing Iraq’s victory.

=== Match details ===
21 July 1988
20:00 UTC+3

Iraq	1–1 (a.e.t.)	Syria
Gorgis 34'		Al-Nasser 33'
Penalties
Mohammed (penalty missed); Hussein (penalty scored); Qais (penalty scored); Shaker (penalty scored); Oraibi (penalty scored)	4–3	(penalty scored) Kardaghli; (penalty missed) Ahmad; (penalty missed) Jakalan; (penalty scored) Saad; (penalty scored) Leyous

Amman International Stadium, Amman
Attendance: 15,000
Referee: Abdelali Naciri (Morocco)

== Legacy ==
The 1988 Arab Cup Final remains a significant moment in Arab football history. Iraq's victory cemented their status as one of the top teams in the region, while the match itself is remembered for its dramatic penalty shootout. Ammo Baba, Iraq’s legendary coach, was lauded for his tactical brilliance throughout the tournament.
