= Abdul Nabi =

Abdul Nabi, also spelled Abd al-Nabi or Abdol Nabi (Arabic: عبد النبي), is a Muslim name occurring throughout the Islamic world, translating to "Servant of the Prophet."

== Given Name ==
- Abdul-Nabi Namazi (1948–2024), Iranian Cleric & Politician
- Abdul-Nabi Isstaif, (born 1952), Syrian Professor
- Abdul Nabi Bangash, (born 1954), Pakistani Politician
- Abdul-Nabi Mousavi Fard, (born 1956), Iranian Cleric & Politician
- Abdul Nabi Salman, (born 1960) Bahraini Politician

== Surname ==
- Basil Abdul Nabi, (born 1963) Kuwaiti Football player
- Abdul Sattar (Maharashtra politician), (born 1965), Indian Politician

== See also ==
- Muhammad
