= 1981 Merdeka Tournament =

Tournament details
- Host country: Malaysia
- Teams: 11 (from 2 confederations)
- Venue(s): 1 (in 1 host city)

Final positions
- Champions: Iraq (1st title)
- Runners-up: (Brazil) Sao Paolo XI

Tournament statistics
- Matches played: 9
- Goals scored: 20 (2.22 per match)

The 1981 Merdeka Tournament was held from 30 August to 20 September 1981 in Malaysia.

== Group stage ==
=== Group A ===
Pos	Team	Pld	W	D	L	GF	GA	GD	Pts	
1	Japan	5	3	2	0	10	5	+5	8	Semifinal
2	India	5	2	2	1	7	5	+2	6	Semifinal
3	New Zealand	5	2	2	1	2	1	+1	6	
4	United Arab Emirates	5	2	0	3	6	10	−4	4	
5	Indonesia	5	1	1	3	5	7	−2	3	
6	Malaysia	5	1	1	3	4	6	−2	3	

Updated to match(es) played on unknown. Source:
30 August 1981

Japan	2–0	Malaysia
Yokoyama 6', 29'	Report

Merdeka Stadium, Kuala Lumpur

1 September 1981

India	0–0	New Zealand
	Report

Merdeka Stadium, Kuala Lumpur

2 September 1981

United Arab Emirates	2–5	Indonesia
Ali 22'; Salim Khalifa 88'	Report	Stefanus Sirey 16' (67), 83'; Pattinasarany 30'; Nere 90+1'

Merdeka Stadium, Kuala Lumpur

3 September 1981

India	2–3	Japan
Ali 30'; Bhattacharya 89' (pen.)	Report	M. Kato 32'; Yokoyama 35', 62'

Merdeka Stadium, Kuala Lumpur

4 September 1981

New Zealand	1–0	Malaysia
Taylor	Report

Merdeka Stadium, Kuala Lumpur

5 September 1981

India	2–0	United Arab Emirates
Harjinder Singh; Xavier Pius	Report

Merdeka Stadium, Kuala Lumpur

7 September 1981

New Zealand	0–0	Indonesia
	Report

Merdeka Stadium, Kuala Lumpur

8 September 1981

Japan	3–2	United Arab Emirates
H. Kato 18' (pen.); Hara 22'; Ozaki 58'	Report	Saim Badid 10'; Ahmed Abdullah 57'

Merdeka Stadium, Kuala Lumpur

9 September 1981

Indonesia	0–2	Malaysia
	Report

Merdeka Stadium, Kuala Lumpur

10 September 1981

New Zealand	0–1	United Arab Emirates
	Report

Merdeka Stadium, Kuala Lumpur

11 September 1981

India	1–0	Indonesia
Roy	Report

Merdeka Stadium, Kuala Lumpur

12 September 1981

Japan	0–1	New Zealand
	Report	Nelson 86'

Merdeka Stadium, Kuala Lumpur

12 September 1981

United Arab Emirates	1–0	Malaysia
	Report

Merdeka Stadium, Kuala Lumpur

14 September 1981

Japan	2–0	Indonesia
Matsuura 58'; Ozaki 60'	Report

Merdeka Stadium, Kuala Lumpur

14 September 1981

India	2–2	Malaysia
Harjinder Singh	Report	Ibrahim Din; Dahari

Merdeka Stadium, Kuala Lumpur

=== Group B ===
Pos	Team	Pld	W	D	L	GF	GA	GD	Pts	
1	(Brazil) Sao Paolo XI	4	4	0	0	12	2	+10	8	Semifinal
2	Iraq	4	2	1	1	13	4	+9	5	Semifinal
3	South Korea	4	1	2	1	4	4	0	4	
4	Thailand	4	1	1	2	6	14	−8	3	
5	Singapore	4	0	0	4	1	12	−11	0	

Updated to match(es) played on unknown. Source:
1 September 1981

Thailand	3–1	Singapore
	Report

Merdeka Stadium, Kuala Lumpur

3 September 1981

Sao Paolo XI (Brazil)	2–1	Iraq
	Report

Merdeka Stadium, Kuala Lumpur

4 September 1981

South Korea	2–0	Singapore
Hwang Seok-keun 20'; Byun Byung-joo 75'	Report

Merdeka Stadium, Kuala Lumpur

7 September 1981

Sao Paolo XI (Brazil)	2–0	South Korea
	Report

Merdeka Stadium, Kuala Lumpur

9 September 1981

Sao Paolo XI (Brazil)	3–0	Singapore
	Report

Merdeka Stadium, Kuala Lumpur

10 September 1981

Iraq	7–1	Thailand
Abdul-Sahib; Aziz; Farhan; Khudhair	Report	Goal

Merdeka Stadium, Kuala Lumpur

13 September 1981

Iraq	1–1	South Korea
Aziz 60'	Report	Byun Byung-joo 40'

Merdeka Stadium, Kuala Lumpur

14 September 1981

Sao Paolo XI (Brazil)	5–1	Thailand
	Report

Merdeka Stadium, Kuala Lumpur

16 September 1981

Iraq	4–0	Singapore
Aziz; Ahmed; Hussein; Hassan	Report

Merdeka Stadium, Kuala Lumpur

16 September 1981

South Korea	1–1	Thailand
Hwang Seok-keun 58'	Report	Chalor 25'

Merdeka Stadium, Kuala Lumpur

== Knockout stage ==
Semifinals
18 September – Kuala Lumpur
Japan	0
Iraq	2
18 September – Kuala Lumpur
(Brazil) Sao Paolo XI	2
India	0

Final
20 September – Kuala Lumpur
(Brazil) Sao Paolo XI	0
Iraq	1

=== Semifinals ===
18 September 1981

Japan	0–2	Iraq
	Report	Hussein 9'; Aziz 60'

Merdeka Stadium, Kuala Lumpur

18 September 1981

Sao Paolo XI (Brazil)	2–0	India
	Report

Merdeka Stadium, Kuala Lumpur

=== Final ===
20 September 1981

Sao Paolo XI (Brazil)	0–1	Iraq
	Report

Merdeka Stadium, Kuala Lumpur
