= Masafumi Yokoyama =

Japanese footballer (born 1956)

Masafumi Yokoyama 横山 正文
Personal information
- Full name: Masafumi Yokoyama
- Date of birth: April 10, 1956 (age 70)
- Place of birth: Nagasaki, Japan
- Height: 1.70 m (5 ft 7 in)
- Position: Forward

Youth career
- 1972–1974: Shimabara Kogyo High School

Senior career*
Years	Team	Apps	(Gls)
1975–?	Nippon Steel		

International career
1979–1984	Japan	31	(10)
- * Club domestic league appearances and goals

Masafumi Yokoyama (横山 正文, Yokoyama Masafumi; born April 10, 1956) is a former Japanese football player. He played for Japan national team.

== Club career ==
Yokoyama was born in Nagasaki Prefecture on April 10, 1956. After graduating from high school, he joined Japan Soccer League Division 1 club Nippon Steel in 1975. However the club performance was not good, the club was relegated to Division 2 in 1982. He played 105 games and scored 29 goals in Division 1.

== National team career ==
On August 23, 1979, Yokoyama debuted for Japan national team against North Korea. In 1980, he played in all matches included 1980 Summer Olympics qualification and 1982 World Cup qualification. In 1983 and 1984, he also played at 1984 Summer Olympics qualification. This qualification was his last game for Japan. He played 31 games and scored 10 goals for Japan until 1984.

== National team statistics ==
Japan national team
Year	Apps	Goals
1979	1	0
1980	12	2
1981	9	6
1982	1	0
1983	7	2
1984	1	0
Total	31	10
