= Lebanon national football team records and statistics =

This article lists various team and individual football records in relation to the Lebanon national football team. The page shows the records as of 17 November 2026.

== Team records ==
=== Wins ===
A thrilling win over DPR Korea

— Fox Sports Asia subheading after the national team won 4–1 against North Korea in 2019

Largest win
11–1 vs Philippines on 6 October 1967
Largest away win
0–5 vs Kuwait on 26 January 1962
Largest win at the Asian Cup
4–1 vs North Korea on 17 January 2019, 2019 Asian Cup

=== Draws ===
Highest scoring draw
3–3 vs Syria on 17 October 1998
Highest scoring draw at the Asian Cup
2–2 vs Iraq on 15 October 2000, 2000 Asian Cup

=== Defeats ===
The Lebanese army intervened to break up a quarrel between the Kuwait and Lebanon national team players.

— Al-Watan newspaper comment after Lebanon's 6–0 home defeat to Kuwait in 2011

Largest defeat
8–0 vs Iraq on 25 November 1959
8–0 vs Qatar on 27 March 1985
Largest defeat at home
0–6 vs Kuwait on 2 July 2011
Largest defeat at the Asian Cup
4–0 vs Iran on 12 October 2000, 2000 Asian Cup

=== Streaks ===
Lebanon went 16 games unbeaten before losing in Kuwait last month. During that run, they conceded just eight goals.

— Fox Sports Australia on Lebanon's 16-game unbeaten streak between 2016 and 2018

Longest unbeaten run
16 games, from 2016 to 2018
Longest run without victory
14, from 1979 to 1988
Most consecutive wins
8, from 1993 to 1996
Most consecutive draws
5, from 2000 to 2001
Most consecutive losses
7, from 2008 to 2009
Most consecutive games with at least one goal scored
9, from 1993 to 1996, and in 2001
Most consecutive games without a goal scored
7, from 1979 to 1987, and from 2018 to 2019
Most consecutive games without a goal conceded
4, in 2015
Most consecutive games with at least one goal conceded
14, from 1953 to 1961

=== FIFA world ranking ===
Source: FIFA.com

Lebanon reaches highest ever position in FIFA World Ranking

— FA Lebanon heading announcing Lebanon's highest ever FIFA World Ranking in September 2018

Highest FIFA ranking
77th (September 2018)
Lowest FIFA ranking
178th (April – May 2011)

The table shows the FIFA World Ranking position that Lebanon held in December of each year (and the current position as of 2026), as well as the highest and lowest positions annually.

Best ranking Worst ranking

Year	Position	Highest	Lowest
1992	161	161	161
1993	108	108	111
1994	129	108	129
1995	134	121	145
1996	97	89	113
1997	90	87	94
1998	85	85	112
1999	111	102	112
2000	110	109	114
2001	93	93	111
2002	119	94	119
2003	115	107	127
2004	105	105	118
2005	125	107	125
2006	126	108	126
2007	134	110	144
2008	150	133	151
2009	148	145	159
2010	154	145	160
2011	111	111	178
2012	127	112	144
2013	121	120	131
2014	126	114	127
2015	139	121	146
2016	147	140	158
2017	85	85	155
2018	81	77	87
2019	89	85	94
2020	92	89	92
2021	95	92	98
2022	100	95	100
2023	107	99	107
2024	112	112	120
2025	108	107	113
2026	111	108	115

Last ranking: 18 November 2026

== Appearances ==
=== General ===
Hassan Maatouk holds the record for most Lebanon international appearances.

Most appearances
Hassan Maatouk (2006–2024), 123 caps

The following are the top ten most capped players; players with an equal number of caps are ranked in chronological order of reaching the milestone:

Rank	Player	Caps	Goals	Period
1	Hassan Maatouk	123	26	2006–2024
2	Mohamad Haidar	110	6	2011–2026
3	Abbas Ahmad Atwi	89	8	2002–2016
4	Roda Antar	83	20	1998–2016
5	Youssef Mohamad	81	3	1999–2016
6	Jamal Taha	71	12	1993–2000
6	Nader Matar	71	4	2012–2024
8	Walid Ismail	69	1	2010–2019
9	Nour Mansour	67	3	2010–2024
10	Vardan Ghazaryan	66	21	1995–2001

As of 17 November 2026. Players in bold are still active with Lebanon.

Mohamad Haidar took the shortest time to reach 100 caps for Lebanon.

First player to reach 100 caps
Hassan Maatouk, vs Kuwait on 19 November 2022
Shortest time needed to reach 100 caps
Mohamad Haidar, 13 years, 3 months and 28 days between his debut (vs Syria on 17 August 2011) and his 100th cap (vs Kuwait on 15 December 2024)
Longest Lebanese career
Hassan Maatouk, 18 years, 4 months and 16 days between first (vs Saudi Arabia on 27 January 2006) and last cap (vs Bangladesh on 11 June 2024)
Most consecutive calendar years of appearances
Hassan Maatouk (2006–2024), 19 years
Appearances in three separate decades
Roda Antar; 18 in the 1990s, 38 in the 2000s, and 26 in the 2010s
Youssef Mohamad; 7 in the 1990s, 41 in the 2000s, and 33 in the 2010s
Hassan Maatouk; 17 in the 2000s, 72 in the 2010s, and 34 in 2020s

== Goals ==
=== General ===
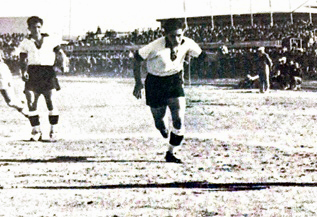
Camille Cordahi scored Lebanon's first international goal in 1940.

Lebanon scored their lone goal in the 7th minute. Kamil [sic] netting on a smart pass from Yaroudi [sic].

— The Palestine Post newspaper comment on Lebanon's first-ever international goal against Mandatory Palestine in 1940.

First goal
Camille Cordahi vs Mandatory Palestine on 27 April 1940
Most goals
Hassan Maatouk (2006–2024), 26 goals

Rank	Player	Goals	Caps	Average	Period
1	Hassan Maatouk (list)	26	123	0.21	2006–2024
2	Vardan Ghazaryan	21	66	0.32	1995–2001
3	Roda Antar	20	83	0.24	1998–2016
4	Mohamad Ghaddar	19	46	0.41	2006–2017
5	Levon Altounian	17	18	0.94	1956–1967
6	Haitham Zein	16	50	0.32	1997–2004
7	Mahmoud El Ali	12	46	0.26	2007–2012
7	Jamal Taha	12	71	0.17	1993–2000
9	Joseph Abou Mrad	11	24	0.46	1953–1967
10	Mardik Tchaparian	10	11	0.91	1956–1963

As of 17 November 2026. Players in bold are still active with Lebanon.

=== Hat-tricks ===
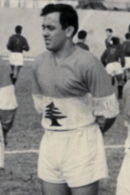
Mardik Tchaparian scored Lebanon's first recorded hat-trick in 1963.

Player	Competition	Against	Home/Away	Result	Goals	Date
Mardik Tchaparian	1963 Arab Cup	Kuwait	Home	6–0	3	31 March 1963
Levon Altounian	1968 Olympics qualification	Philippines	Neutral	11–1	4	6 October 1967
Samir Nassar	1968 Olympics qualification	Philippines	Neutral	11–1	3	6 October 1967
Haitham Zein	1999 Arab Games	Jordan	Away	3–1	3	23 August 1999
Gilberto	Friendly	Oman	Home	3–1	3	5 August 2000
Haitham Zein	2002 World Cup qualification	Pakistan	Home	6–0	3	13 May 2001
Roda Antar	2002 Arab Cup	Yemen	Home	4–2	3	24 December 2002
Hassan Maatouk	2026 World Cup qualification	Bangladesh	Home	4–0	3	11 June 2024
Husseyn Chakroun	Friendly	Maldives	Neutral	6–0	3	1 October 2026

As of 1 October 2026

=== In major tournaments ===
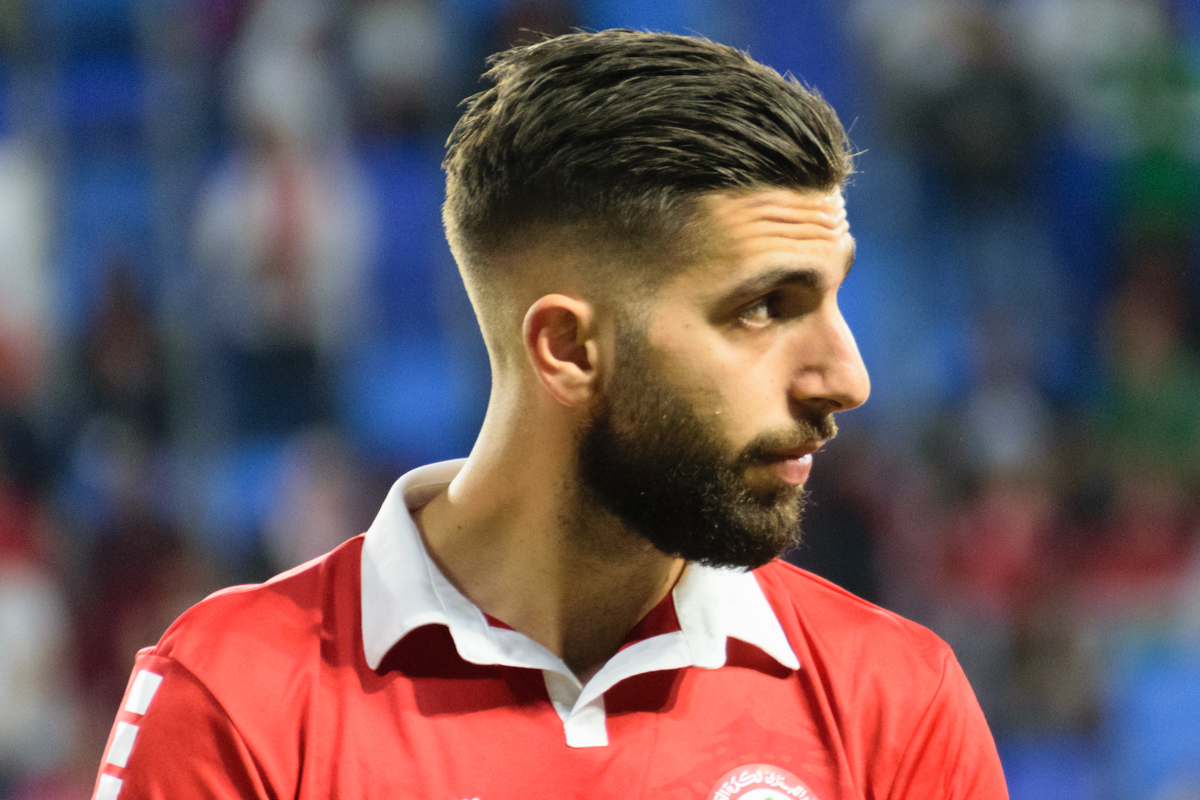
Hilal El-Helwe is the first player to score two goals in one match at the Asian Cup for Lebanon

==== AFC Asian Cup ====
Most goals in a single Asian Cup tournament
Hilal El-Helwe (in 2019), 2 goals
Most goals in total at Asian Cup tournaments
Hilal El-Helwe (in 2019), 2 goals
Most goals in a single Asian Cup finals match
Hilal El-Helwe, 2 goals vs North Korea on 17 January 2019
First goal in an Asian Cup finals match
Abbas Chahrour, vs Iraq on 15 October 2000

== Captains ==
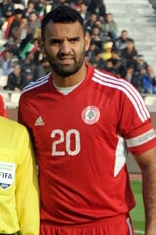
Roda Antar captained the Lebanon national team for 12 years, between 2004 and 2016.

Player	Year(s)	Source
Unknown	1940	
Labib Majdalani	1942	
Emile Nassar	1947	
Unknown	1953–1956	
Youssef Yammout	1957–1963	
Levon Altounian	1963	
Elias Georges	1965	
Joseph Abou Mrad	1966	
Unknown	1967	
Toni Jreij	1970	
Adnan Al Sharqi	1971	
Souheil Rahal	1971	
Unknown	1974–1975	
Abdelrahman Chebaro	1979	
Ahmad Saleh	1985	
Unknown	1987	
Hassan Abboud	1988	
Ghassan Abou Diab	1988–1993	
Hassan Ayoub (Note: In 1993, Issam Kobeissy acted as captain in Hassan Ayoub's absence.)	1993–1996	
Jamal Taha	1995–2000	
Ali Fakih	2001	
Moussa Hojeij	2002	
Youssef Mohamad (Note: In 2003, one of Faisal Antar and Abbas Ali Atwi acted as captain in Youssef Mohamad's absence.)	2003–2004	
Roda Antar (Note: Between 2004 and 2016, Youssef Mohamed acted as captain in Roda Antar's absence.)	2004–2016	
Hassan Maatouk	2016–2024	
Mohamad Haidar (Note: Between 2024 and 2026, Kassem El Zein acted as captain in Mohamad Haidar's absence.)	2024–2026	
Mostafa Matar	2026–present	

== See also ==
- Lebanon national football team results
- List of Lebanon national football team managers
