= List of Lebanon national football team managers =

The Lebanon national football team has been managed by 30 head coaches since its first international match in 1940. The team's first recorded manager was Abed Traboulsi, who oversaw Lebanon's first two official matches between 1942 and 1947. Both Lebanese and foreign coaches have led the national team, with managers from Europe and the Arab world serving in the role.

As of 2026, Miodrag Radulović is Lebanon's most successful manager by number of wins, having recorded 24 victories across two spells in charge. He also holds the records for the most matches managed (61). Terry Yorath ranks second in wins with 15, while Theo Bücker and Joseph Nalbandian follow with 13 and 11 wins respectively.

== Managers ==
The following table provides a summary of the complete record of each Lebanon national football team manager, including their progress in the World Cup, Asian Cup, and Olympic Games.

Manager	Nationality	First match	Last match	Pld	W	D	L	W%	PPG (Note: According to the "three points for a win" standard)	Competitions
Unknown	—	27 April 1940	27 April 1940	1	0	0	1	0.00	0.00	
Abed Traboulsi	Lebanon	26 April 1942	4 April 1947	2	0	0	2	0.00	0.00	
Jean Arab	Lebanon	18 May 1947	18 May 1947	1	0	0	1	0.00	0.00	
Vinzenz Dittrich	Austria	3 August 1953	23 January 1955	4	1	1	2	25.00	1.00	
Ljubiša Broćić	Yugoslavia	29 February 1956	29 February 1956	1	0	0	1	0.00	0.00	
Unknown	—	18 October 1957	24 October 1957	4	1	2	1	25.00	1.25	
Harry Wright	England	15 November 1959	25 November 1959	2	0	0	2	0.00	0.00	1960 Olympics – Did not qualify
Joseph Nalbandian (1)	Lebanon	27 August 1961	5 September 1961	5	2	0	3	40.00	1.20	
Mitri Adem (1)	Lebanon	26 January 1962	29 January 1962	2	2	0	0	100.00	3.00	
Joseph Nalbandian (2)	Lebanon	31 March 1963	26 September 1963	7	3	0	4	42.86	1.29	
Unknown	—	8 March 1964	8 March 1964	1	1	0	0	100.00	3.00	
Mitri Adem (2)	Lebanon	13 November 1964	20 November 1964	4	1	1	2	25.00	1.00	
Joseph Nalbandian (3)	Lebanon	20 March 1965	9 October 1967	16	6	3	7	37.50	1.31	1968 Olympics – Did not qualify
Mitri Adem (3)	Lebanon	8 July 1970	8 July 1970	1	0	0	1	0.00	0.00	
Joseph Abou Mrad (1)	Lebanon	20 June 1971	24 December 1971	8	3	0	5	37.50	1.13	1972 Olympics – Did not qualify 1972 Asian Cup – Did not qualify
Adnan Al Sharqi (1)	Lebanon	29 September 1974	5 October 1974	4	1	1	2	25.00	1.00	
Unknown	—	16 May 1975	27 May 1975	3	2	0	1	66.67	2.00	
Joseph Abou Mrad (2)	Lebanon	16 November 1979	22 November 1979	2	0	1	1	0.00	0.50	1980 Asian Cup – Did not qualify
Todor Simeonovski	Bulgaria	15 March 1985	27 March 1985	5	0	0	5	0.00	0.00	1986 World Cup – Did not qualify
Samir El Adou	Lebanon	16 September 1987	20 September 1987	2	0	1	1	0.00	0.50	
Zein Hachem	Lebanon	11 April 1988	2 November 1989	10	1	3	6	10.00	0.60	
Adnan Al Sharqi (2)	Lebanon	20 January 1993	11 June 1993	13	3	4	6	23.08	1.00	1994 World Cup – Did not qualify
Terry Yorath	Wales	6 December 1995	21 August 1997	31	15	8	8	48.39	1.71	1996 Asian Cup – Did not qualify 1998 World Cup – Did not qualify
Diethelm Ferner	Germany	20 July 1998	26 July 1998	3	1	0	2	33.33	1.00	
Mahmoud Saad	Egypt	18 August 1998	27 August 1999	18	4	5	9	22.22	0.94	
Bram Braam	Netherlands	24 November 1999	15 December 1999	2	0	1	1	0.00	0.50	
Josip Skoblar	Croatia	16 February 2000	18 October 2000	16	4	8	4	25.00	1.25	2000 Asian Cup – Group stage
Theo Bücker (1)	Germany	31 January 2001	30 May 2001	10	5	4	1	50.00	1.90	2002 World Cup – Did not qualify
Richard Tardy	France	1 September 2002	12 November 2003	13	3	3	7	23.08	0.92	
Mohammad Kwid (1)	Syria	19 November 2003	28 November 2003	2	0	0	2	0.00	0.00	2004 Asian Cup – Did not qualify
Mahmoud Hammoud	Lebanon	16 December 2003	3 July 2004	11	3	2	6	27.27	1.00	
Mohammad Kwid (2)	Syria	31 August 2004	2 May 2005	8	1	4	3	12.50	0.88	2006 World Cup – Did not qualify
Adnan Al Sharqi (3)	Lebanon	27 January 2006	22 June 2008	22	5	6	11	22.73	0.95	2007 Asian Cup – Did not qualify 2010 World Cup – Did not qualify
Emile Rustom	Lebanon	14 January 2009	28 July 2011	18	3	3	12	16.67	0.67	2011 Asian Cup – Did not qualify
Theo Bücker (2)	Germany	17 August 2011	11 June 2013	34	8	8	18	23.53	0.94	2014 World Cup – Did not qualify
Giuseppe Giannini	Italy	6 September 2013	6 November 2014	14	3	6	5	21.43	1.07	2015 Asian Cup – Did not qualify
Miodrag Radulović (1)	Montenegro	24 May 2015	17 January 2019	37	13	13	11	35.14	1.41	2018 World Cup – Did not qualify 2019 Asian Cup – Group stage
Liviu Ciobotariu	Romania	30 July 2019	19 November 2019	10	3	3	4	30.00	1.20	
Jamal Taha	Lebanon	12 November 2020	23 June 2021	7	2	1	4	28.57	1.00	
Ivan Hašek	Czech Republic	21 September 2021	29 March 2022	13	2	3	8	15.38	0.69	2022 World Cup – Did not qualify
Aleksandar Ilić	Serbia	19 November 2022	10 September 2023	13	5	3	5	38.46	1.38	
Nikola Jurčević	Croatia	12 October 2023	21 November 2023	4	0	2	2	0.00	0.50	
Miodrag Radulović (2)	Montenegro	28 December 2023	26 November 2025	24	11	5	8	45.83	1.58	2023 Asian Cup – Group stage 2026 World Cup – Did not qualify
Madjid Bougherra	Algeria	4 June 2026	present	5	1	2	2	20.00	1.00	2027 Asian Cup – Did not qualify
Totals				413	119	107	187	28.81	1.12	—

Last updated: Lebanon vs Palestine, 17 November 2026.

== See also ==
- List of Lebanon women's national football team managers
- Lebanon national football team records and statistics
- Lebanon national football team results
