= Majid Namjoo-Motlagh =

Iranian footballer and manager

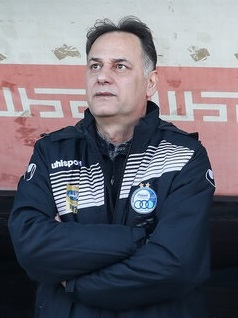

Personal information
- Full name: Majid Namjoo-Motlagh
- Date of birth: May 31, 1966 (age 60)
- Place of birth: Tehran, Iran
- Height: 1.82 m (5 ft 11 1/2 in)
- Position: Midfielder

Team information
- Current team: Esteghlal (technical director)

Senior career*
Years	Team	Apps	(Gls)
1982–1984	Bank Melli		
1984–1990	Esteghlal		
1990	Al-Sadd		
1991	Pas		
1991–1992	Esteghlal		
1992–1994	Keshavarz		
1994–1997	Persepolis		
1998	Tanjong Pagar United		
1998–2000	Bargh Tehran		

International career
1986–1997	Iran	45	(4)

Managerial career
- 2006–2007: Shahrdari Bandar Abbas
- 2009–2012: Esteghlal (assistant)
- 2010: Aboomoslem
- 2011–2012: Sanati Kaveh
- 2014–2015: Aluminium Hormozgan
- 2015–2016: Gol Gohar Sirjan
- 2018–2019: Shahrdari Mahshahr
- 2020: Esteghlal (assistant)
- 2020: Esteghlal (caretaker)
- 2023: Esteghlal (technical director)
- 2026–: Esteghlal (technical director)
- * Club domestic league appearances and goals

Majid Namjoo-Motlagh (Persian: مجید نامجو مطلق; born May 31, 1966, in Tehran, Iran) is a former Iranian football player and now manager.

== Playing career ==
=== International career ===
Namjoo-Moltagh debuted for the Iran national team on 28 May 1986, in a friendly match against China in Beijing. He made 45 appearances for Iran from 1986 to 1997. In August 2015, he played for Iranian All-Star team against World All-Star and got rejected when asking to exchange his jersey with one of the all-star players.

== Managerial career ==
Namjoo-Motlagh signed as head-coach of newly formed Shahrdari Bandar Abbas in August 2006. Near the end of the season he was replaced by former Mes Kerman head coach, Nader Dastneshan.

== Personal life ==
On 8 January 2026, Namjoo-Motlagh publicly supported the 2025–2026 Iranian protests and criticized the government's characterization of the protesters as rioters, stating: "The people you called patriotic and honorable during the 12-day war are now not rioters, but protesting the economic situation. You should have found the fault in yourself."

== Career statistics ==
=== International goals ===
#	Date	Venue	Opponent	Score	Result	Competition
1.	1 November 1989	Al-Sadaqua Walsalam Stadium, Kuwait City, Kuwait	South Yemen	2–0	Won	1989 P&F Cup
2.	1 November 1989	Al-Sadaqua Walsalam Stadium, Kuwait City, Kuwait	South Yemen	2–0	Won	1989 P&F Cup
3.	6 January 1993	Azadi Stadium, Tehran, Iran	Pakistan	5–0	Won	1993 ECO Cup
4.	4 July 1993	Damascus, Syria	Chinese Taipei	0–6	Won	1994 World Cup qual.
Correct as of 6 October 2015

== Honours ==
=== Club ===
Esteghlal

- Asian Club Championship (1): 1990-91
- Iranian Football League (1): 1989-90
- Tehran Province League (2): 1985-86, 1991–92

Persepolis

- Iranian Football League (2): 1995-96, 1996-97

=== National ===
Iran

- Asian Games Gold Medal (1): 1990
