= Basil Abdul Nabi =

Kuwaiti footballer

Personal information
- Full name: Basil Abdul Nabi
- Date of birth: 28 August 1963 (age 63)
- Place of birth: Kuwait City, Kuwait
- Height: 1.70 m (5 ft 7 in)
- Position: Striker

Senior career*
Years	Team	Apps	(Gls)
1980–1997	Al-Salmiya SC	378	(60)

International career
1982–1997	Kuwait	13	(3)
- * Club domestic league appearances and goals

Basil Abdul Nabi (born 28 August 1963) is a former professional Kuwaiti footballer. He was a part of the mini revival of Kuwaiti football between 1975 and 1996. His part included winning two Gulf Cups.
