= Basil Fadhel =

Iraqi footballer

Personal information
- Full name: Basil Fadhel Hassan
- Date of birth: 10 May 1963
- Place of birth: Iraq
- Position: Midfielder

Senior career*
Years	Team	Apps	(Gls)
1983–1986	Al-U'mmal		
1986–1990	Al-Naft SC		
1990–1991	Al-Jaish SC		
1991–1991	Al-Karkh SC		
1991–1993	Al-Quwa Al-Jawiya		
1993–1994	Al-Sinaa SC		
1994–1995	Salahaddin FC		
1995–1996	Al-Kadhimiya		
1996–1998	Al-Jaish SC		

International career
1989-1990	Iraq		
- * Club domestic league appearances and goals

Basil Fadhel (born 10 May 1963) is an Iraqi former football midfielder who played for Iraq.He played for the national team in the 1989 Peace and Friendship Cup.

== Statistics ==
=== International goals ===
Scores and results list Iraq's goal tally first.

#	Date	Venue	Opponent	Score	Result	Competition
1.	3 November 1989	Al-Sadaqua Walsalam Stadium, Kuwait City	South Yemen	6–2	6–2	1989 Peace and Friendship Cup
