= Mahdi Jassim =

Iraqi association football player

Personal information
- Full name: Mahdi Jassim Mohammed Hassan
- Date of birth: 4 March 1956 (age 70)
- Place of birth: Iraq
- Position: Midfielder

Team information
- Current team: Al-Quwa Al-Jawiya (Administrative director)

International career
Years	Team	Apps	(Gls)
1980–1986	Iraq		

Managerial career
- 2013: Al-Quwa Al-Jawiya
- 2020–: Al-Quwa Al-Jawiya (Administrative director)

Mahdi Jassim Mohammed Hassan (Arabic: مَهْدِيّ جَاسِم مُحَمَّد حَسَن; born 4 March 1956) is an Iraqi former football midfielder who played for Iraq at the 1977 FIFA World Youth Championship and 1985 Pan Arab Games.

Mahdi played for the national team between 1980 and 1986.

== Career statistics ==
=== International goals ===
Scores and results list Iraq's goal tally first.

No	Date	Venue	Opponent	Score	Result	Competition
1.	16 March 1980	Al-Shaab Stadium, Baghdad	Jordan	1–0	1–0	1980 Olympics qualifiers
