= Abdul-Nabi Isstaif =

Syrian literary critic

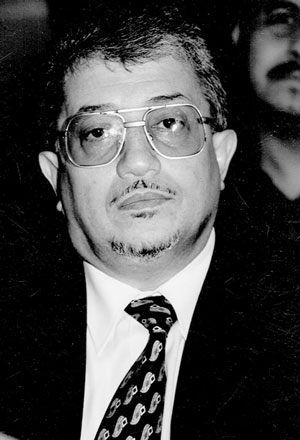
Abdul-Nabi Isstaif

Abdul-Nabi Isstaif (Arabic: عبد النبي اصطيف, romanized: ‘Abd al-Nabī Iṣṣṭayf; born 1952) is a professor of comparative literature, critical theory and translation at Damascus University.

Abdul-Nabi Isstaif was educated at the University of Damascus and St. Antony's College, University of Oxford, where he received his D.Phil. in comparative criticism in 1983. He is a specialist in modern Arabic literature and criticism with special reference to Western influences. Isstaif has taught at the University of Oxford (U.K), Sanaa University (Yemen), King Saud University (Saudi Arabia), New College of the University of South Florida and Roger Williams University (U.S.A.), University of Jaumi I (Spain), Deakin University (Australia), Al-Baath University (Homs, Syria) as well as the Academy of Dramatic Arts, the Higher Institute of Technology and Applied Sciences and the Higher Institute of Interpreting and Translation in Syria. He is also interested in Anglo-American Orientalism and in the Euro-Arab cultural relations in medieval and modern times, publishing several books in Arabic, and over 900 articles, papers, reviews and translations in both Arabic and English in more than 90 periodicals in Syria, the Arab World, Europe and the United States of America.

Twice vice-dean for academic affairs, and a former chairman of Arabic Department at the University of Damascus, Isstaif founded the Syrian General Organization of Books and was its first general director (2006–2008). He was also a member of the founding team which established the Higher Institute for Interpreting and Translation at the University of Damascus. A former editor in chief of the Damascus University Journal for Literatures and Humanities, Isstaif is also a consultant editor of several Arabic and English scholarly journals in both the Arab World (Al-Mutarjim and Semiotique, Universite d'Oran, Algrie) and the United Kingdom (Journal of Islamic Studies, Oxford, and Journal of Islamic Jerusalem Studies, Dundee). Representing Syria (particularly the University of Damascus) in many regional, pan-Arab and international conferences, meetings and cultural weeks, Isstaif has participated in tens of academic, cultural and literary conferences and symposia all over the Arab World and beyond, and has lectured widely in many Arab, Eastern and Western universities on Arabic literature relations with the literatures of the world, Arabic culture, Orientalism and Edward Said, and on world civilizations and their interrelations.

== Publications ==
In addition to his many articles in The Arab Encyclopaedia (in Arabic), and the Encyclopaedia of Arabic Literature (in English), Isstaif has published the following books:

- Towards A New Orientalism (Routledge, London & New York, 2010), forthcoming.
- Syria: The Ancient Realm of Writings (Ministry of Information, Damascus, 2004), (in both Arabic and English).
- الحركة الأدبية في بلاد الشام: المجلد الأول تاريخ (منشورات الأمانة العامة لاحتفالية دمشق عاصمة الثقافة العربية، دمشق، 2008م)؛ تحرير وإشراف على النشر بالاشتراك مع محمود ربداوي ووهب رومية وعلي أبوزيد وفوزية زوباري.
- The Literary Movement in Greater Syria: Vol. 1- A History (The Chief Editor and Contributor of the Introduction and two Major Chapters), Damascus: The Capital of Arab Culture, Damascus, 2008), (in Arabic).
- الحركة الأدبية في بلاد الشام: المجلد الثاني مختارات (منشورات الأمانة العامة لاحتفالية دمشق عاصمة الثقافة العربية، دمشق، 2008م)؛ تحرير وإشراف على النشر بالاشتراك مع محمود ربداوي ووهب رومية وعلي أبوزيد وفوزية زوباري.
- The Literary Movement in Greater Syria: Vol. 2- Selections (The Chief Editor and Contributor of a Major Chapter), Damascus: The Capital of Arab Culture, Damascus, (2008),(in Arabic).
- صورة النبي محمد (ص) في الكتابات الأنكلو-أمريكية (الهيئة العامة السورية للكتاب، دمشق، 2008)؛
- The Image of the Prophet Muhammad in the Anglo American Writings (the Syrian General Organization of Books, Damascus, 2008, (in Arabic).
- من الأندلس إلى أمريكا: الموشحات الأندلسية وأثرها في الشعر الغنائي الغربي، (الهيئة العامة السورية للكتاب ودار البعث، دمشق، 2007)؛
- From Andalusia to America: The Andalusian-Arabic Muwashshahs (strophic poetry) and their Impact on Western Lyrical Poetry (the Syrian General Organization of Books, Damascus & Dar al-Baath, 2007), (in Arabic).
- العرب والأدب المقارن (الهيئة العامة السورية للكتاب، دمشق، 2007).
- The Arabs and Comparative Literature (the Syrian General Organization of Books, Damascus, 2007), (in Arabic).
- سورية: مملكة الكتابة العريقة (بالعربية والإنكليزية) (وزارة الإعلام، دمشق، 2004)؛
- Syria: The Ancient Realm of Writings (Ministry of Information, Damascus, 2004).
- نقد ثقافي أم نقد أدبي؟ (بالاشتراك مع د.عبد الله الغذامي)، (دار الفكر، دمشق، 2004)؛
- Cultural Criticism or Literary Criticism? (in Collaboration with Abdullah al-Ghadhdhami),(Dar al-Fikr, Damascus & Beirut, 2004)
- في النقد الأدبي العربي الحديث، جزءان، (منشورات جامعة دمشق، دمشق، ط1، 1990،ط2، 2003 م، ط3 2005م)؛
- On Modern Arabic Literary Criticism: Prefaces, Entries, Texts, 2 Volumes (Damascus University Press, 1990, 2003 & 2005).

He was also the main contributor to several text books written for the Teachers Training Institutes and Universities in Syria.
