= 1989 Peace and Friendship Cup =

Tournament details
- Host country: Kuwait
- Dates: 30 October –12 November 1989
- Teams: 7 (from 2 confederations)
- Venue: 1 (in 1 host city)

Final positions
- Champions: Iraq (1st title)
- Runners-up: Uganda
- Third place: Kuwait
- Fourth place: Iran

Tournament statistics
- Matches played: 13
- Goals scored: 33 (2.54 per match)

The 1989 Peace and Friendship Cup was a seven-team friendly football tournament, held in Kuwait City, Kuwait from 30 October to 12 November 1989. The timing of this tournament was a year after the end of Iran–Iraq War. Some notable sporting personalities attended this tournament such as Juan Antonio Samaranch, João Havelange and Michel Platini. The seven teams that participated in this tournament were: Kuwait as Host, Iran (third Place Team of 1988 Asian Cup), Iraq (who had participated in 1988 Olympic Games), South Yemen, Lebanon and two countries from Africa: Uganda and Guinea.

The cup was held as part of the 1989 Peace and Friendship Games, which included 44 countries competing in other sports.

== Competition ==
=== Group stage ===
==== Group A ====
Team	Pts	Pld	W	D	L	GF	GA	GD
Kuwait	3	2	1	1	0	6	1	+5
Uganda	3	2	1	1	0	3	1	+2
Lebanon	0	2	0	0	2	0	7	−7

30 October 1989
00:00 UTC-3

Kuwait	5–0	Lebanon
Al-Anbari 14'; Abdul Nabi 39'; Suleyman 40'; Al-Hassawi 57', 78'	Report

Al-Sadaqua Walsalam Stadium, Kuwait City
Attendance: 35,000
Referee: (Denmark) Kim Nielsen

2 November 1989
00:00 UTC-3

Uganda	2–0	Lebanon
Senoga 29'; Musisi 38'

Al-Sadaqua Walsalam Stadium, Kuwait City
Attendance: 13,000
Referee: Mohamed Salah Karim

4 November 1989
00:00 UTC-3

Kuwait	1–1	Uganda
Al-Anbari 43'		Vvubya 73'

Al-Sadaqua Walsalam Stadium, Kuwait City
Attendance: 25,000
Referee: (Northern Ireland) Oliver Donnelly

==== Group B ====
Team	Pts	Pld	W	D	L	GF	GA	GD
Iran	4	3	1	2	0	3	1	+2
Iraq	3	3	1	1	1	6	3	+3
Guinea	3	3	1	1	1	2	2	0
South Yemen	2	3	1	0	2	3	8	−5

31 October 1989
00:00 UTC-3

Guinea	1–0	Iraq
Camara 90'

Al-Sadaqua Walsalam Stadium, Kuwait City
Attendance: 28,000
Referee: Jawad Ashoor

1 November 1989
00:00 UTC-3

Iran	2–0	South Yemen
Namjoo-Motlagh 35', 61'	Report

Al-Sadaqua Walsalam Stadium, Kuwait City
Attendance: 15,000
Referee: (Belgium) Jean-François Crucke

3 November 1989
00:00 UTC-3

Iraq	6–2	South Yemen
Radhi 24' 58'; Hussein 55' 87'; Kadhim 63'; Fadhel 89'		Hussein 51', 72'

Al-Sadaqua Walsalam Stadium, Kuwait City
Attendance: 24,800
Referee: Shuaib Mohammed

3 November 1989
00:00 UTC-3

Iran	1–1	Guinea
Moharrami 48' (penalty)	Report	Emmerson 75'

Al-Sadaqua Walsalam Stadium, Kuwait City
Attendance: 12,000
Referee: (Kuwait) Issa Al-Jassas

5 November 1989
00:00 UTC-3

South Yemen	1–0	Guinea
Hussein 76'

Al-Sadaqua Walsalam Stadium, Kuwait City
Attendance: 8,500
Referee: Hassan Al-Moussa

5 November 1989
00:00 UTC-3

Iran	0–0	Iraq
	Report

Al-Sadaqua Walsalam Stadium, Kuwait City
Attendance: 30,000
Referee: (Switzerland) Freddie Vilburg

=== Semi finals ===
8 November 1989
00:00 UTC-3

Iran	2–2 (a.e.t.)	Uganda
Ansarifard 22'; Bayani 115'	Report	Vvubya 26'; Musisi 106'
Penalties
	6–7

Al-Sadaqua Walsalam Stadium, Kuwait City
Attendance: 26,000
Referee: (Denmark) Kim Nielsen

8 November 1989
00:00 UTC-3

Iraq	2–1	Kuwait
Radhi 26', 90'	Report	Al-Saleh 70'

Al-Sadaqua Walsalam Stadium, Kuwait City
Attendance: 35,000
Referee: (Belgium) Jean-François Crucke

=== Third-place match ===
12 November 1989
00:00 UTC-3

Iran	0–1	Kuwait
	Report	Al-Asfoor 5'

Al-Sadaqua Walsalam Stadium, Kuwait City
Attendance: 8,000
Referee: (Northern Ireland) Thomas Donnelly

=== Final ===
12 November 1989
00:00 UTC-3

Iraq	1–1 (a.e.t.)	Uganda
Radhi 75'		Hasule 35'
Penalties
	4–3

Al-Sadaqua Walsalam Stadium, Kuwait City
Attendance: 35,000
Referee: (Denmark) Kim Nielsen

== Goalscorers ==
5 goals

- (Iraq) Ahmed Radhi

3 goals

- (South Yemen) Mohammed Hussein

2 goals

- (Iran) Majid Namjoo-Motlagh
- (Iraq) Laith Hussein
- (Kuwait) Badr Al-Anbari
- (Kuwait) Salah Al-Hassawi
- (Uganda) Ronald Vvubya
- (Uganda) Magid Musisi

1 goals

- (Guinea) Abdoulaye Emmerson
- (Guinea) Fodé Camara
- (Iran) Mojtaba Moharrami
- (Iran) Shahrokh Bayani
- (Iran) Mohammad Hassan Ansarifard
- (Iraq) Samir Kadhim
- (Iraq) Basil Fadhel
- (Kuwait) Abdullah Al-Asfoor
- (Kuwait) Hamad Al-Saleh
- (Kuwait) Abdul Nabi
- (Kuwait) Wael Suleyman
- (Uganda) Paul Hasule
- (Uganda) Umar Senoga
