= Football at the 1980 Summer Olympics – Men's qualification =

Football at the 1980 Summer Olympics started on 20 July and ended on 2 August.

== Qualified teams ==
Due to the American-led boycott, countries (in brackets) who qualified did not enter the final tournament. Spain sent a team which competed under the flag of the Spanish Olympic Committee.

- Automatically qualified
  - Soviet Union (as host nation)
  - East Germany (as holders)
- Europe (UEFA)
  - Czechoslovakia
  - Finland (replaces Norway)
  - (International Olympic Committee) Spain
  - Yugoslavia
- Africa (CAF)
  - Algeria
  - Nigeria (replaces Ghana)
  - Zambia (replaces Egypt)
- Asia (AFC)
  - Iraq (replaces Malaysia)
  - Kuwait
  - Syria (replaces Iran)
- North and Central America (CONCACAF)
  - Costa Rica
  - Cuba (replaces United States)
- South America (CONMEBOL)
  - Colombia
  - Venezuela (replaces Argentina)

== Qualifications ==
=== UEFA (Europe) ===
The European Qualifiers for the 1980 Summer Olympics tournament took place over a total of two rounds between 28 March 1979 and 23 April 1980. After the second round, Czechoslovakia, Norway, Spain and Yugoslavia gained qualification to the Olympic tournament. However, Norway was replaced by Finland.

=== CONMEBOL (South America) ===
The South American Pre-Olympic tournament was held from 23 January to 15 February 1980 in Colombia, and saw Argentina and Colombia qualify. However, Argentina was replaced by Venezuela.

=== CONCACAF (North, Central America and Caribbean) ===
The CONCACAF qualifying rounds and Pre-Olympic tournament was held from 1 April 1979 to 2 April 1980, and saw Costa Rica and United States qualify. United States was replaced by Cuba.

=== CAF (Africa) ===
The African Qualifiers tournament for the 1980 Summer Olympics took place over a total of three rounds between 25 March 1979 and 13 April 1980. After the third round, Algeria, Ghana and Egypt gained qualification to the Olympic tournament. However, Ghana was replaced by Nigeria and Egypt was replaced by Zambia.

=== AFC (Asia) ===
The Pre-Olympic tournaments of the Asian Qualifiers for the 1980 Summer Olympic were held from 23 February to 6 April 1980 in Iraq, Malaysia and Singapore. Respectively from these countries, Kuwait, Malaysia and Iran qualify. However, Malaysia was replaced by Iraq and Iran was replaced by Syria.
