= Faisal Aziz =

Iraqi association football player

Personal information
- Full name: Faisal Aziz Jabar
- Date of birth: 1957
- Place of birth: Iraq
- Position: Forward

Senior career*
Years	Team	Apps	(Gls)
	Al-Shorta		(42)

International career
1980–1982	Iraq		

Managerial career
- 1992: Al-Shorta
- 1996–1997: Al-Shorta
- 1998–1999: Al-Shorta
- 2008: Al-Shorta
- 2018: Iraq U17
- * Club domestic league appearances and goals

Faisal Aziz Jabar (Arabic: فَيْصَل عَزِيز جَبَّار; born 1957) is an Iraqi former footballer who played as a forward. He represented the Iraq national team in the 1982 Asian Games.

Faisal played for the national team between 1980 and 1981. He made his international debut against Poland in 1980. In 1981, he helped Iraq win the Pestabola Merdeka.
