= 1988 Arab Cup =

5th Arab Cup, held in Jordan

Tournament details
- Host country: Jordan
- Dates: 8–21 July
- Teams: 10 (from 2 confederations)
- Venue: 1 (in 1 host city)

Final positions
- Champions: Iraq (4th title)
- Runners-up: Syria
- Third place: Egypt
- Fourth place: Jordan

Tournament statistics
- Matches played: 24
- Goals scored: 35 (1.46 per match)
- Top scorer(s): (Iraq) Ahmed Radhi (4 goals)
- Best player: (Jordan) Tawfiq Al-Saheb

The 1988 Arab Cup was the fifth edition of the Arab Cup hosted by Amman, Jordan. The defending champion Iraq won the title for the 4th consecutive time.

== Historical context ==
The 1988 Arab Cup was held from 8 to 21 July 1988 during the final phase of the Iran–Iraq War (1980–1988). A ceasefire was agreed on 20 August 1988, shortly after the tournament concluded.

The competition took place against a backdrop of regional political tensions. The war did not directly affect the organisation or format of the tournament.

Iraqi football in this period has later been discussed in connection with the control of sport under Uday Saddam Hussein, although such accounts generally relate to the wider period rather than this specific tournament.

== Qualification ==
Jordan qualified automatically as hosts and Iraq as holders.

=== Zone 1 (Gulf Area) ===
Bahrain and Kuwait qualified.

=== Zone 2 (Red Sea) ===
Egypt and Saudi Arabia qualified.

=== Zone 3 (North Africa) ===
The tournament was held in Algiers, Algeria. Libya and Morocco withdrew.

Team	Pld	W	D	L	GF	GA	GD	Pts
Algeria	2	1	1	0	3	0	+3	3
Tunisia	2	1	1	0	2	1	+1	3
Mauritania	2	0	0	2	1	5	–4	0

11 December 1987

Algeria	0–0	Tunisia

5 July Stadium, Algiers
Attendance: 17,900
Referee: Jamal Al Sharif (Syria)

13 December 1987

Tunisia	2–1	Mauritania
Maâloul 37' (pen.); Mahjoubi 84'		Sikki 16'

5 July Stadium, Algiers

15 December 1987

Algeria	3–0	Mauritania
Boukar 44'; Djahmoune 52'; Dahmani 85'

5 July Stadium, Algiers
Attendance: 3,000

Algeria and Tunisia qualified.

=== Zone 4 (East Region) ===
The tournament was held in Aleppo, Syria.

Team	Pld	W	D	L	GF	GA	GD	Pts
Syria	2	2	0	0	5	1	+4	4
Lebanon	2	0	1	1	1	2	–1	1
Palestine	2	0	1	1	0	3	–3	1

Syria and Lebanon qualified.

11 April 1988

Syria	2–1	Lebanon
Mahrous 90+1'		Hammoud 18'

Al-Hamadaniah Stadium, Aleppo
Referee: Mohammad Hansal (Algeria)

13 April 1988

Lebanon	0–0	Palestine

Al-Hamadaniah Stadium, Aleppo
Referee: Ahmad Al Bash (Jordan)

15 April 1988

Syria	3–0	Palestine
Daraji 3' (o.g.); Ahmad 22'; Majd 57'	Report

Al-Hamadaniah Stadium, Aleppo

== Qualified teams ==
The 10 qualified teams are:

Participants
Zone	Team
Hosts	Jordan
Holders	Iraq
Zone 1 (Gulf Area)	Bahrain
Zone 1 (Gulf Area)	Kuwait (Note: Under-23 Olympic Team was representing Kuwait and Saudi Arabia.)
Zone 2 (Red Sea)	Egypt
Zone 2 (Red Sea)	Saudi Arabia
Zone 3 (North Africa)	Algeria (Note: University Team was representing Algeria.)
Zone 3 (North Africa)	Tunisia
Zone 4 (East Region)	Syria
Zone 4 (East Region)	Lebanon

== Final tournament ==
=== Venues ===
Amman	1988 Arab Cup is located in Jordan
Amman International Stadium	1988 Arab Cup is located in Jordan
Capacity: 25,000	1988 Arab Cup is located in Jordan

=== Group stage ===
Algeria and Saudi Arabia did not send their senior national teams to the competition. Instead, Algeria sent a University XI, probably an Under-23 squad, while Saudi Arabia's A team was in Australia during the tournament.

==== Group A ====
Team	Pld	W	D	L	GF	GA	GD	Pts
Egypt	4	2	2	0	4	0	+4	6
Iraq	4	1	3	0	3	1	+2	5
Lebanon	4	1	2	1	2	4	−2	4
Tunisia	4	0	3	1	3	4	−1	3
Saudi Arabia Ol.	4	0	2	2	1	4	−3	2

9 July 1988

Egypt	0–0	Saudi Arabia Ol.

Amman International Stadium, Amman
Attendance: 17,000
9 July 1988

Iraq	1–1	Tunisia
Radhi 32'		Mahjoubi 62'

Amman International Stadium, Amman
Attendance: 17,000
Referee: Issa Al-Jassas (Kuwait)

11 July 1988

Iraq	0–0	Lebanon

Amman International Stadium, Amman
Attendance: 8,000
11 July 1988

Saudi Arabia Ol.	1–1	Tunisia
Farhan 80'		Maaloul 90' (pen.)

Amman International Stadium, Amman
Attendance: 8,000

13 July 1988

Egypt	1–0	Tunisia
Soliman 62'

Amman International Stadium, Amman
Attendance: 18,000
Referee: Mohamed Hansal (Algeria)
13 July 1988

Lebanon	1–0	Saudi Arabia Ol.
Hammoud 81'

Amman International Stadium, Amman
Attendance: 18,000

15 July 1988

Iraq	2–0	Saudi Arabia Ol.
Radhi 13', 35'

Amman International Stadium, Amman
Attendance: 22,000
15 July 1988

Egypt	3–0	Lebanon
Shawky 29'; Abouzaid 68'; H. Hassan 88'

Amman International Stadium, Amman
Attendance: 22,000

17 July 1988

Lebanon	1–1	Tunisia
Hammoud 65'		Mehedhebi 46'

Amman International Stadium, Amman
Attendance: 25,000
17 July 1988

Iraq	0–0	Egypt

Amman International Stadium, Amman
Attendance: 25,000

==== Group B ====
Team	Pld	W	D	L	GF	GA	GD	Pts
Jordan	4	2	1	1	4	2	+2	5
Syria	4	2	1	1	4	4	0	5
Algeria UT	4	1	2	1	3	3	0	4
Kuwait Ol.	4	1	1	2	2	3	−1	3
Bahrain	4	0	3	1	2	3	−1	3

8 July 1988

Jordan	0–0	Bahrain

Amman International Stadium, Amman
Attendance: 15,000
8 July 1988

Syria	1–1	Algeria UT
Jakalan 31'		Hadj Adlane 62'

Amman International Stadium, Amman
Attendance: 15,000

10 July 1988

Jordan	0–1	Kuwait Ol.
		Al Breiki

Amman International Stadium, Amman
Attendance: 21,000
10 July 1988

Algeria UT	0–0	Bahrain

Amman International Stadium, Amman
Attendance: 21,000

12 July 1988

Syria	2–1	Bahrain
Deeb 6'; Jakalan 83'		Salim 16'

Amman International Stadium, Amman
Attendance: 19,000
12 July 1988

Algeria UT	1–0	Kuwait Ol.
Hadj Adlane 24'

Amman International Stadium, Amman
Attendance: 19,000
Referee: Ali Bin Nasser (Tunisia)

14 July 1988

Syria	1–0	Kuwait Ol.
Kardaghli 81'

Amman International Stadium, Amman
Attendance: 20,000
14 July 1988

Jordan	2–1	Algeria UT
Yadaje 61'; Abdel Muneim 75'		El-Groud 74'

Amman International Stadium, Amman
Attendance: 27,000

16 July 1988

Jordan	2–0	Syria
Yadaje 12'; Al Sahob 35'

Amman International Stadium, Amman
Attendance: 27,000
16 July 1988

Kuwait Ol.	1–1	Bahrain
Goal		Goal

Amman International Stadium, Amman
Attendance: 20,000

=== Knockout stage ===
Semi-finals
19 July 1988 – Amman
Syria (p)	0 (4)
Egypt	0 (3)
19 July 1988 – Amman
Iraq	3
Jordan	0

Final
21 July 1988 – Amman
Syria	1 (3)
Iraq (p)	1 (4)
Third place
21 July 1988 – Amman
Egypt	2
Jordan	0

==== Semi-finals ====
19 July 1988

Syria	0–0 (a.e.t.)	Egypt
Penalties
Kardaghli (penalty scored); Ahmad (penalty scored); Al-Qolla (penalty scored); Deeb (penalty scored)	4–3	(penalty scored) Abouzeid; (penalty scored) Shawky; (penalty scored) H. Hassan; (penalty missed) Youssef; (penalty missed) Mayhoub

Amman International Stadium, Amman
Attendance: 33,000
Referee: Mohamed Hansal (Algeria)

19 July 1988
19:15

Iraq	3–0	Jordan
Radhi 22'; Ali 45'; Sharif 80'

Amman International Stadium, Amman
Attendance: 33,000

==== Third place play-off ====
21 July 1988

Egypt	2–0	Jordan
Mayhoub 49'; H. Hassan 90'

Amman International Stadium, Amman

==== Final ====
21 July 1988
--:-- UTC+3

Iraq	1–1 (a.e.t.)	Syria
Gorgis 34'		Al-Nasser 33'
Penalties
Mohammed (penalty missed); Hussein (penalty scored); Qais (penalty scored); Shaker (penalty scored); Oraibi (penalty scored)	4–3	(penalty scored) Kardaghli; (penalty missed) Ahmad; (penalty missed) Jakalan; (penalty scored) Saad; (penalty scored) Leyous

Amman International Stadium, Amman
Attendance: 15,000
Referee: Abdelali Naciri (Morocco)

== Top scorers ==
4 Goals

- (Iraq) Ahmed Radhi

2 Goals

- (Algeria) Tarek Hadj Adlane
- (Egypt) Hossam Hassan
- (Jordan) Nart Yadaje
- (Lebanon) Mahmoud Hamoud
- (Syria) Mohammad Jakalan
