= Ismail Mohammed Sharif =

Iraqi footballer

Personal information
- Full name: Ismail Mohammed Sharif
- Date of birth: 19 January 1962 (age 64)
- Place of birth: Iraq
- Position: Midfielder

Senior career*
Years	Team	Apps	(Gls)
- Al-Zawra'a SC
- Al-Shorta SC
- Al-Shabab
- Al-Quwa Al-Jawiya
- Al-Shabab
- Al-Sinaa SC
- Al-Kut SC

International career
1985–1990	Iraq		
- * Club domestic league appearances and goals

Ismail Mohammed Sharif (born 19 January 1962) is an Iraqi football midfielder who played for Iraq in the 1986 FIFA World Cup. He also played for Al-Shorta SC and Al-Shabab.

== Career statistics ==
=== International goals ===
Scores and results list Iraq's goal tally first.

No	Date	Venue	Opponent	Score	Result	Competition
1.	19 July 1988	Amman International Stadium, Amman	Jordan	3–0	3–0	1988 Arab Nations Cup
2.	6 January 1989	Royal Oman Police Stadium, Muscat	Oman	1–0	1–1	1990 FIFA World Cup qualification
