= Football at the 1984 Summer Olympics – Men's qualification =

The men's qualification for the 1984 Summer Olympics.

== Qualified teams ==
Sixteen teams qualified for the Olympic tournament after continental qualifying rounds. Three Warsaw Pact countries had qualified but withdrew as part of the Soviet-led boycott. They were replaced as follows:

- East Germany were replaced by Norway
- USSR were replaced by West Germany
- Czechoslovakia were replaced by Italy

- Automatically qualified
  - United States (as hosts)
  - Italy (replaces holders Czechoslovakia)
- Europe (UEFA)
  - France
  - Norway (replaces East Germany)
  - West Germany (replaces Soviet Union)
  - Yugoslavia
- Africa (CAF)
  - Cameroon
  - Egypt
  - Morocco
- Asia (AFC)
  - Iraq
  - Saudi Arabia
  - Qatar
- North and Central America (CONCACAF)
  - Canada
  - Costa Rica
- South America (CONMEBOL)
  - Brazil
  - Chile

== Qualifications ==
=== UEFA (Europe) ===
The European Qualifiers for the 1984 Summer Olympics tournament took place in 4 groups between 23 March 1983 and 22 April 1984. France, Czechoslovakia, East Germany, Soviet Union and Yugoslavia gained qualification to the Olympic tournament. Czechoslovakia was replaced by Italy, East Germany was replaced by Norway and Soviet Union was replaced by West Germany.

=== CONMEBOL (South America) ===
The South American Pre-Olympic tournament was held over a total of two rounds from 8 to 21 February 1984 in Ecuador, Brazil and Chile, and saw Brazil and Chile qualify.

=== CONCACAF (North, Central America and Caribbean) ===
The CONCACAF qualifying rounds and Pre-Olympic tournament was held from 16 January 1983 to 25 April 1984, and saw Canada and Costa Rica qualify.

=== CAF (Africa) ===
The African Qualifiers tournament for the 1984 Summer Olympics took place over a total of four rounds between 3 March 1983 and 26 February 1984. After the fourth round, Cameroon, Egypt and Morocco gained qualification to the Olympic tournament.

=== AFC (Asia) ===
The Pre-Olympic tournaments of the Asian Qualifiers for the 1984 Summer Olympic were held from 12 August 1983 to 29 April 1984. Iraq, Saudi Arabia and Qatar qualify.
