= Mohammad Jakalan =

Syrian footballer (born 1961)

Mohammad Jaqalan
Personal information
- Full name: Mohmmad Jaqalan
- Date of birth: 1961 (age 64–65)
- Place of birth: Aleppo, Syria
- Position: Midfielder

Senior career*
Years	Team	Apps	(Gls)
1977–1983	Al-Ittihad Aleppo		
1983–1986	Al-Jaish		
1986–1990	Al-Ittihad Aleppo		
1990	Al-Orouba		

International career
1981–1989	Syria		
- * Club domestic league appearances and goals

Mohammad Jaqalan (Arabic: محمد جقلان) is a Syrian football midfielder who played for Syria in the 1988 Asian Cup.

== International Record ==
Year	Competition	Apps	Goal
1988	Asian Cup	4	0
Total		4	0
