= 1966 Arab Cup squads =

Below is a list of squads used in the 1966 Arab Cup.

== Group A ==
=== Bahrain ===
Coach: Jassim Al-Moawdah

No.	Pos.	Player	Date of birth (age)	Caps	Goals	Club
	GK	Abdullah Waleed				
	GK	Merza Hasan				
	DF	Rashed Salebeekh				(Bahrain Football Association) Al-Nusoor
	DF	Yusef Khyrallah				(Bahrain Football Association) Al-Taj
	DF	Farhan Mubarak				(Bahrain Football Association) West Riffa SC
	DF	Ibrahim Ali Ibrahim				
	DF	Saeed Al-Ebadi				(Bahrain Football Association) Al-Nusoor
	MF	Naser Waleed				
	MF	Salem "Saleem" Mubarak				(Bahrain Football Association) West Riffa SC
	MF	Abdullah Mohammad				
	MF	Mohammed Al-Moqahwi				
	FW	Ahmed Salmeen				(Bahrain Football Association) Al-Muharraq
	FW	Adnan Ayub				(Bahrain Football Association) Al-Nusoor
	FW	Khalifa Salmane Al-Khalifa	1948			(Bahrain Football Association) Al-Muharraq
	FW	Yusef Zwaid				
	FW	Hasan Zalekh	1954			(Bahrain Football Association) Al-Nusoor

=== Iraq ===
Coach: Adil Basher

No.	Pos.	Player	Date of birth (age)	Caps	Goals	Club
	GK	Hamid Fawzi	1 July 1939 (aged 26)			
	GK	Mohammed Thamer	1 July 1938 (aged 27)			
	DF	Hassan Balah	1 July 1942 (aged 23)			(Iraq Football Association) Al-Firqa Al-Thalitha
	DF	Sahib Khazal	1 January 1943 (aged 23)			(Iraq Football Association) Al-Quwa Al-Jawiya
	DF	Jabbar Rashak	1 July 1942 (aged 23)			(Iraq Football Association) Al-Firqa Al-Thalitha
	DF	Tariq Razouki				
	MF	Salman Dawood (c)				
	MF	Shamil Flayeh	1 July 1940 (aged 25)			
	MF	Shidrak Yousif	1 July 1944 (aged 21)			(Iraq Football Association) Al-Firqa Al-Thalitha
	MF	Gorgis Ismail	1942 (aged 24)			(Iraq Football Association) Al-Firqa Al-Thalitha
	MF	Qais Hameed				(Iraq Football Association) Maslahat Naqil Al-Rukab
	MF	Shamil Tabra				
	MF	Basil Mahdi	1 July 1944 (aged 21)			
	MF	Hussein Hashim	1 July 1933 (aged 32)			
	FW	Hisham Atta	1 January 1941 (aged 25)			(Iraq Football Association) Al-Quwa Al-Jawiya
	FW	Qasim Mahmoud	4 July 1939 (aged 26)			(Iraq Football Association) Al-Quwa Al-Jawiya
	FW	Mahmoud Assad				
	FW	Amer Jameel	1 July 1945 (aged 20)			
	FW	Mohammed Najim				

=== Jordan ===
Coach: Shehadeh Mousa

No.	Pos.	Player	Date of birth (age)	Caps	Goals	Club
	GK	Nader Srour				(Jordan Football Association) Al-Faisaly
	DF	Abdel-Raouf Al-Kelani				(Jordan Football Association) Al-Jazeera
	DF	Jamil Al-Abdallat				(Jordan Football Association) Al-Faisaly
	MF	Adib Al-Fakhouri				(Jordan Football Association) Al-Faisaly
	MF	Tony Zaghloul				(Jordan Football Association) Al-Jazeera
	MF	Mohammad Awad	12 February 1939 (aged 27)			(Jordan Football Association) Al-Faisaly
	MF	Sultan Al-Adwan	1 January 1936 (aged 30)			(Jordan Football Association) Al-Faisaly
	MF	Rebhy Al-Masri				
	FW	Adel Issa				(Jordan Football Association) Al-Faisaly
	FW	Mustafa Al-Adwan	1 May 1942 (aged 23)			(Jordan Football Association) Al-Faisaly
	FW	Jawdat Abdel Muneim				(Jordan Football Association) Al-Faisaly
	FW	Ali Al-Shaqran				(Jordan Football Association) Al-Faisaly
	FW	Mousa Al-Banna	1 January 1932 (aged 34)			(Jordan Football Association) Al-Wehdat

=== Kuwait ===
Coach: (United Arab Republic) Saleh El Wahsh

No.	Pos.	Player	Date of birth (age)	Caps	Goals	Club
	GK	Ahmed Al-Tarabulsi	22 March 1947 (aged 19)			(Kuwait Football Association) Al-Kuwait
	MF	Abdulrahman Al-Dawla	1941			(Kuwait Football Association) Al-Arabi
	FW	Abdullah Al-Asfour	1943			(Kuwait Football Association) Al-Arabi
		Mansur Al-Omar				(Kuwait Football Association) Al-Arabi
		...				

=== Lebanon ===
Coach: Joseph Nalbandian

No.	Pos.	Player	Date of birth (age)	Caps	Goals	Club
	GK	Samih Chatila	1931 (aged 34–35)			(Lebanese Football Association) Homenetmen
	GK	Abdelrahman Chbaro	14 March 1943 (aged 23)			(Lebanese Football Association) Al-Nejmeh
	DF	Muhieddine "Tabello" Itani	6 September 1929 (aged 36)			(Lebanese Football Association) Al-Nejmeh
	DF	Elias Georges Kharma				(Lebanese Football Association) Racing Beirut
	MF	Adnan "Al Sharqi" Mekdache	15 November 1943 (aged 22)			(Lebanese Football Association) Al Ansar
	FW	Joseph Abou Murad	18 April 1933 (aged 32)			(Lebanese Football Association) Racing Beirut
	FW	Mahmoud "Abou Taleb" Berjaoui	18 December 1940 (aged 25)			(Lebanese Football Association) Al-Nejmeh
	FW	Mohammad Chatila	26 October 1942 (aged 23)			(Lebanese Football Association) Al-Nejmeh
		Habib Kamouna				
		Abraham "Apo" Kasabian				
		Souhail Rahal				
		Ragheb Shaker				

== Group B ==
=== Libya ===
Coach:

No.	Pos.	Player	Date of birth (age)	Caps	Goals	Club
	MF	Mahmoud Al-Jahani	1947			(Libyan Football Federation) Al-Wahda Tripoli
	MF	Ahmed Al-Ahwal	1936			(Libyan Football Federation) Al-Ittihad Tripoli
	FW	Ahmed Ben Soueid	1946			(Libyan Football Federation) Al-Ahly Benghazi
	FW	Ali Al-Biski	1941			(Libyan Football Federation) Al-Madina
	FW	Abdul-Kadir Al-Khatiti	1943			(Libyan Football Federation) Al-Ahly Benghazi
		Mahmoud Ben Zayed				
		...				

=== North Yemen ===
Coach:

No.	Pos.	Player	Date of birth (age)	Caps	Goals	Club
		...				

=== Palestine ===
Coach:

No.	Pos.	Player	Date of birth (age)	Caps	Goals	Club
	GK	Marwan Kanafani	1938			(Egyptian Football Association) Al Ahly
	GK	Faeq Al-Hannawi	1943			(Palestinian Football Association) Gaza SC
	DF	Ali Abu Hamda	1948			(Kuwait Football Association) Khaitan
	DF	Fouad Abu Ghaida	1953			(Egyptian Football Association) Al Ahly
	FW	Ismail Al-Masry				(Palestinian Football Association) Gaza SC
	FW	Ibrahim Al-Maghrebi				(Syrian Football Association) Damascus Al-Ahly
		Moamar Besiso				(Palestinian Football Association) Gaza SC
		Omar Al-Sheikh Taha	1943			(Lebanese Football Association) Racing Club
		Hosam Al-Samari				(Egyptian Football Association) Al Zamalek
		Nabil Al-Shami				
		Faisal Bibi				(Egyptian Football Association) Al Ahly
		Khaleel Istanbuli				(Palestinian Football Association) Gaza SC
		Fathi Yousef				
		Abdelkader Shaib				(Egyptian Football Association) Al Zamalek
		Mohammed Al-Shaikh				
		Khadar Qadada				
		Mundhir Al-Mozainy				

=== Syria ===
Coach: (Romania) Cornel Drăgușin

No.	Pos.	Player	Date of birth (age)	Caps	Goals	Club
	GK	Fares Salteje	1 January 1939 (aged 27)			(Syrian Football Association) Al-Jaish
	GK	Ahmed Jabban				(Syrian Football Association) Al-Ittihad Aleppo
	DF	Tariq Alosh				
	DF	Azmi Haddad	1937 (aged 29)			(Syrian Football Association) Al-Jaish
	DF	Hafid Abu Lbada				(Syrian Football Association) Al-Jaish
	MF	Hagop Averian				
	MF	Wael Akkad				(Syrian Football Association) Al-Ittihad Aleppo
	MF	Yusef Tamim				(Syrian Football Association) Barada
	MF	Ghasan Kezberi				
	FW	Nureddin Idlibi				
	FW	Ahmed Alian				
	FW	Avadis Kaoulekian				
