= 1964 Arab Cup squads =

Below is a list of squads used in the 1964 Arab Cup.

== Iraq ==
Coach: Adil Basher

No.	Pos.	Player	Date of birth (age)	Caps	Goals	Club
	GK	Latif Shandal	1 July 1938 (aged 26)			
	GK	Mohammed Thamer	1 July 1938 (aged 26)			
	DF	Hassan Balah	1 July 1942 (aged 22)			(Iraq Football Association) Al-Firqa Al-Thalitha
	DF	Sahib Khazal	1 January 1943 (aged 21)			(Iraq Football Association) Al-Quwa Al-Jawiya
	DF	Jamil Abbas	1 January 1927 (aged 37)			(Iraq Football Association) Al-Firqa Al-Thalitha
	DF	Hussein Jaber				
	DF	Hussein Hashim	1931 (aged 33)			
	MF	Salman Dawood (c)				
	MF	Khoshaba Lawo	1 July 1939 (aged 25)			
	MF	Shamil Flayeh	1 July 1940 (aged 24)			
	MF	Gorgis Ismail				(Iraq Football Association) Al-Firqa Al-Thalitha
	MF	Qais Hameed				(Iraq Football Association) Maslahat Naqil Al-Rukab
	MF	Shamil Tabra				
	MF	Faleh Hassan Wasfi	1948 (aged 24)			(Iraq Football Association) Al-Mina'a
	MF	Basil Mahdi	1 July 1944 (aged 20)			
	FW	Hisham Atta	1 January 1941 (aged 23)			(Iraq Football Association) Al-Quwa Al-Jawiya
	FW	Qasim Mahmoud	4 July 1939 (aged 25)			(Iraq Football Association) Al-Quwa Al-Jawiya
	FW	Shakir Ismail	1 July 1927 (aged 37)			
	FW	Mohammed Abdul-Majid	1 July 1938 (aged 26)			

== Jordan ==
Coach: Shehadeh Mousa

No.	Pos.	Player	Date of birth (age)	Caps	Goals	Club
	GK	Nazmi Al-Saeed				(Jordan Football Association) Al-Ahli Amman
	GK	Abdullah Abu Nuwar	1 January 1929 (aged 35)			(Jordan Football Association) Al-Jazeera
	DF	Abdel-Raouf Al-Kelani				(Jordan Football Association) Al-Jazeera
	DF	Mohammad Hameed	1 January 1927 (aged 37)			(Jordan Football Association) Al-Jazeera
	DF	Mansour Qardan				(Jordan Football Association) Al-Ahli Amman
	DF	Mazhar Al-Saeed				(Jordan Football Association) Al-Ahli Amman
	MF	Rebhy Al-Masri				
	MF	Sultan Al-Adwan	1 January 1936 (aged 28)			(Jordan Football Association) Al-Faisaly
	MF	Mohammad Awad	12 February 1939 (aged 25)			(Jordan Football Association) Al-Faisaly
	MF	Moussa Al-Dajani				
	FW	Shafiq Adas				(Jordan Football Association) Al-Faisaly
	FW	Mousa Al-Banna	1 January 1932 (aged 32)			(Jordan Football Association) Al-Wehdat
	FW	Mustafa Al-Adwan	1 January 1936 (aged 28)			(Jordan Football Association) Al-Faisaly
	FW	Jawdat Abdel Muneim				(Jordan Football Association) Al-Faisaly
	FW	Adel Issa				(Jordan Football Association) Al-Faisaly
	FW	Ali Al-Shaqran				(Jordan Football Association) Al-Faisaly

== Kuwait ==
Coach: (United Arab Republic) Saleh El Wahsh

No.	Pos.	Player	Date of birth (age)	Caps	Goals	Club
5	DF	Abdullah Al-Qatami				(Kuwait Football Association) Al-Salmiya
	FW	Ibrahim Al-Khashram				(Kuwait Football Association) Al-Kuwait
		...				

== Lebanon ==
Coach: Joseph Nalbandian

No.	Pos.	Player	Date of birth (age)	Caps	Goals	Club
	FW	Mohammad Chatila	26 October 1942 (aged 22)			(Lebanese Football Association) Al-Nejmeh
	FW	Samir Elias Nassar	1946			(Lebanese Football Association) Al Shabiba
	FW	Ragheb Shaker				(Lebanese Football Association)
	DF	Kamal Radwan	1944(aged 20)			(Lebanese Football Association) Akhaa Aley
		...				

== Libya ==
Coach:

No.	Pos.	Player	Date of birth (age)	Caps	Goals	Club
	GK	Ali Abu Oud	1943 (aged 21)			(Libyan Football Federation) Al-Ahly Benghazi
	GK	Faraj Adwal	1943 (aged 21)			(Libyan Football Federation) Al-Ittihad Derna
	DF	Ashour Khal				
	DF	Mahmud Al-Shawush	1938 (aged 26)			(Libyan Football Federation) Al-Madina
	DF	Mohammed Al-Khamsi				(Libyan Football Federation) Al Ahli Tripoli
	DF	Mohamed Al-Sartawi				(Libyan Football Federation) Al Ahli Tripoli
	DF	Mahmud Abeziou				
	MF	Miloud Aribi				
	MF	Ahmed Al-Ahwal	1936 (aged 28)			(Libyan Football Federation) Al-Ittihad Tripoli
	MF	Hassan Al-Sanoussi				(Libyan Football Federation) Al Ahli Tripoli
	MF	Rajab Al-Ahwal	1939 (aged 25)			(Libyan Football Federation) Al-Ittihad Tripoli
	MF	Nouri Al-Tarhouni	1946 (aged 18)			(Libyan Football Federation) Al-Ittihad Tripoli
	FW	Mehdi Al-Sokny	1940 (aged 24)			(Libyan Football Federation) Al-Ittihad Tripoli
	FW	Ahmed Ben Soueid	1946 (aged 18)			(Libyan Football Federation) Al-Ahly Benghazi
	FW	Ali Al-Biski	1941 (aged 23)			(Libyan Football Federation) Al-Madina
	FW	Mahjoub Bouker				(Libyan Football Federation) Al-Hilal Benghazi
