= 1966 Arab Cup final =

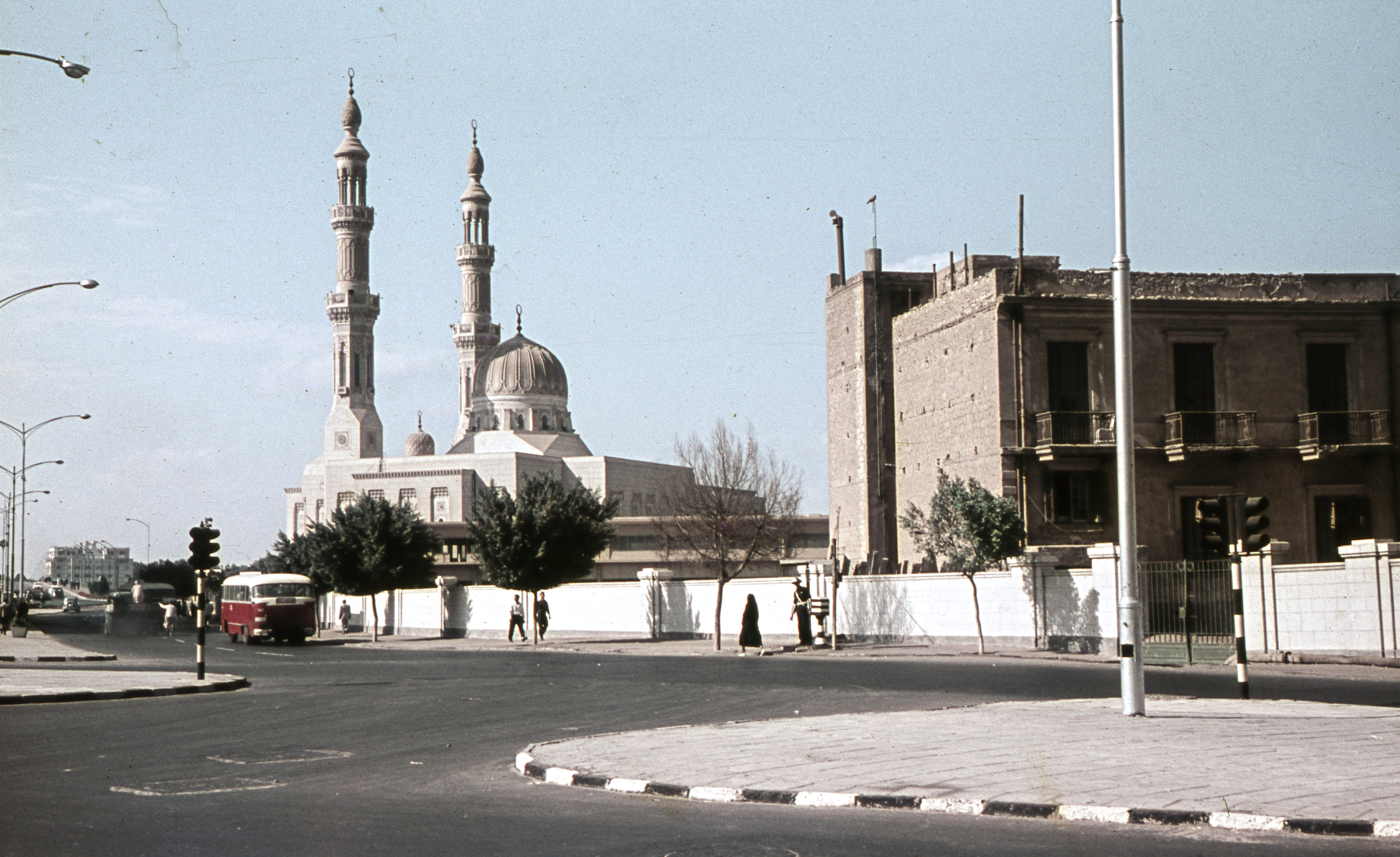
- Baghdad hosts the final tournament
- Event: 1966 Arab Cup
Iraq	Syria
(Iraq)	(Syria)
2	1
- Date: 10 April 1966
- Venue: Al-Kashafa Stadium, Baghdad
- Referee: Mamdouh Khourma (Jordan)
- Attendance: 20,000

The 1966 Arab Cup final was a football match that took place on 10 April 1966, at the Al-Kashafa Stadium in Baghdad, Iraq, to determine the winner of the 1966 Arab Cup. Iraq defeated Syria 2–1 with two goals from Ismail Gorgis to Iraq and a goal from Nureddin Idlibi to Syria, to win their second Arab Cup.

== Road to the final ==
Iraq		Syria	
Opponents	Results	Opponents	Results
Group stage
Lebanon	0–0	North Yemen	4–1
Jordan	2–1	Libya	0–0
Kuwait	3–1	Palestine	3–1
Bahrain	10–1		
Semi-finals
Libya	3–1	Lebanon	1–0

== Match summary ==
Iraq emerged victorious with a close 2–1 win over Syria. Ismail Gorgis proved to be the hero for the Iraqi side, scoring both their goals. Syria managed a consolation goal through Nureddin Idlibi, but it wasn't enough to overcome the Iraqi dominance.

=== Details ===
10 April 1966
18:00 UTC+3

Iraq	2–1	Syria
Ismail 65', 81'		Idlibi 33'

Al-Kashafa Stadium, Baghdad
Attendance: 20,000
Referee: Mamdouh Khourma (Jordan)

Iraq	Syria

Iraq:
GK	–	Hamid Fawzi
DF	–	Hassan Ali Ahmed
DF	–	Sahib Khazal
DF	–	Jabbar Rashak
MF	–	Salman Dawood (c)
MF	–	Shamil Flayeh
MF	–	Shidrak Yousif
MF	–	Gorgis Ismail
MF	–	Qais Hameed
FW	–	Hisham Atta
FW	–	Nouri Dhiab	(substituted off) 46'
Substitutes:
GK	–	Mohammed Thamer
MF	–	Shamil Tabra
MF	–	Basil Mahdi
FW	–	Qasim Mahmoud
FW	–	Mahmoud Assad	(substituted on) 46'
FW	–	Hussein Hashim
	–	Tariq Razouki
	–	Amer Jameel
	–	Mohammed Najim
Manager:
Adil Basher

Syria:
GK	–	Fares Salteje
DF	–	Ahmed Jabban
DF	–	Tariq Alosh
DF	–	Azmi Haddad
DF	–	Hafid Abu Lbada
MF	–	Hagop Averian
MF	–	Wael Akkad
MF	–	Yusef Tamim	Substituted off
FW	–	Nureddin Idlibi
FW	–	Ahmed Alian
FW	–	Avadis Kaoulekian
Substitutes:
MF	–	Ghasan Kezberi	Substituted on
Manager:
(Romania) Cornel Drăgușin

Assistant referees:
Rashad Hawasly (Syria)
Saadi Abd Al-Kareem (Iraq)
