= Iraq national football team records and statistics =

The lists shown below shows the Iraq national football team all-time record against opposing nations. The statistics are composed of FIFA World Cup, FIFA Confederations Cup, AFC Asian Cup and Summer Olympics matches, as well as numerous international friendly tournaments and matches.

== Records ==
Players in bold are still active with Iraq.

=== Most appearances ===
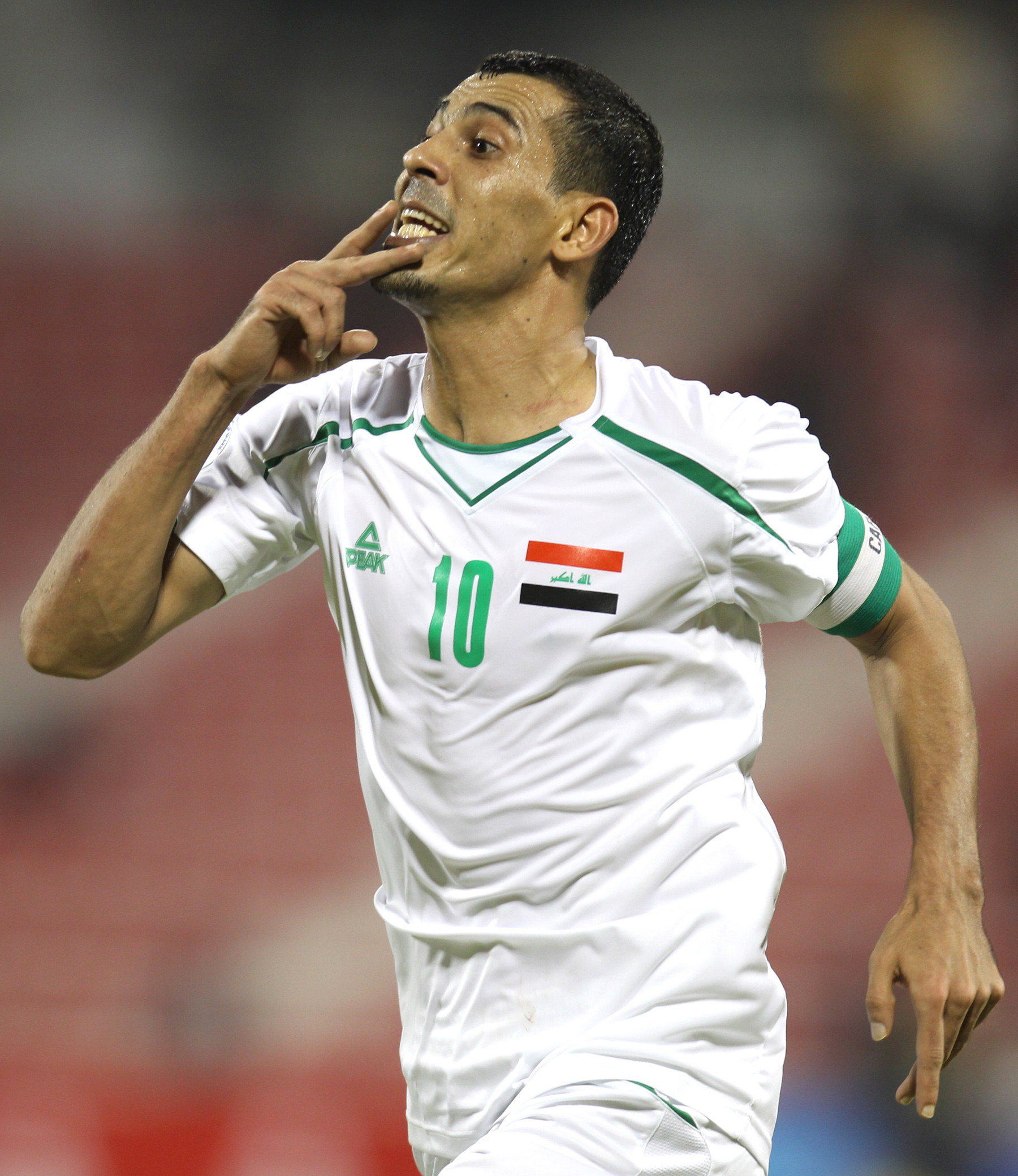
Younis Mahmoud is Iraq's all-time most capped player, having played in 148 official matches.

Rank	Player	Caps	Goals	Career
1	Younis Mahmoud	148	57	2002–2016
2	Hussein Saeed	137	78	1976–1990
3	Alaa Abdul-Zahra	124	17	2007–2021
4	Adnan Dirjal	122	8	1978–1990
5	Ahmed Radhi	121	62	1982–1997
6	Ahmed Ibrahim	117	5	2010–2022
7	Nashat Akram	113	17	2001–2013
7	Hawar Mulla Mohammed	113	20	2001–2012
7	Ali Rehema	113	2	2005–2016
10	Mahdi Karim	110	11	2001–2018

=== Top goalscorers ===
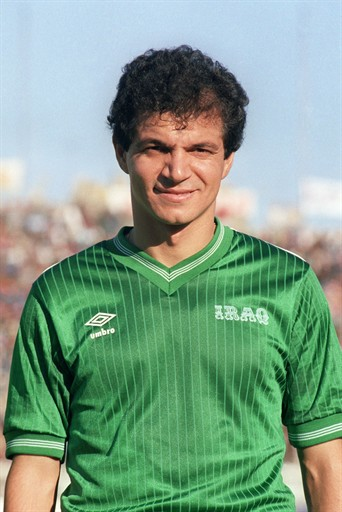
Hussein Saeed is Iraq's all-time leading goalscorer, having scored 78 goals in 137 official matches.

Rank	Player	Goals	Caps	Ratio	Career
1	Hussein Saeed (list)	78	137	0.57	1976–1990
2	Ahmed Radhi	62	121	0.51	1982–1997
3	Younis Mahmoud	57	148	0.39	2002–2016
4	Ali Kadhim	36	84	0.43	1970–1980
5	**Aymen Hussein**	34	100	0.34	2015–present
6	Falah Hassan	29	102	0.28	1970–1986
7	**Mohanad Ali**	27	73	0.37	2017–present
7	Emad Mohammed	27	103	0.26	2001–2012
9	Razzaq Farhan	25	63	0.4	1998–2007
10	Laith Hussein	22	80	0.28	1986–2002

== Competitive record ==
=== FIFA World Cup ===
FIFA World Cup record										Qualification record					
Year	Round	Position	Pld	W	D*	L	GF	GA	Squad	Pld	W	D	L	GF	GA
1930 to 1950	Not a FIFA member									Not a FIFA member					
1954 to 1970	Did not enter									Did not enter					
(West Germany) 1974	Did not qualify									6	3	2	1	11	6
(Argentina) 1978	Withdrew									Withdrew					
(Spain) 1982	Did not qualify									4	3	0	1	5	2
(Mexico) 1986	Group stage	23rd	3	0	0	3	1	4	Squad	8	5	1	2	14	11
(Italy) 1990	Did not qualify									6	3	2	1	11	5
(United States) 1994	Did not qualify									13	7	4	2	37	13
(France) 1998	Did not qualify									4	2	0	2	14	8
(South Korea) (Japan) 2002	Did not qualify									14	6	3	5	37	15
(Germany) 2006	Did not qualify									6	3	2	1	17	7
(South Africa) 2010	Did not qualify									8	3	2	3	11	6
(Brazil) 2014	Did not qualify									16	7	3	6	20	12
(Russia) 2018	Did not qualify									16	6	5	5	24	18
(Qatar) 2022	Did not qualify									18	6	8	4	20	16
(Canada) (Mexico) (United States) 2026	Group stage	48th	3	0	0	3	1	12	Squad	21	13	5	3	32	14
(Morocco) (Portugal) (Spain) 2030	To be determined									To be determined					
(Saudi Arabia) 2034	To be determined									To be determined					
Total	Group stage	2/19	6	0	0	6	2	16	—	140	67	37	36	253	133

FIFA World Cup history
Year	Manager	Round	Score	Result	Goalscorers for Iraq
1986	(Brazil) Evaristo de Macedo	Group stage			
1986	(Brazil) Evaristo de Macedo	Group stage	Iraq 0–1 Paraguay	Loss	
1986	(Brazil) Evaristo de Macedo	Group stage	Iraq 1–2 Belgium	Loss	Radhi 59'
1986	(Brazil) Evaristo de Macedo	Group stage	Iraq 0–1 Mexico	Loss	
2026	(Australia) Graham Arnold	Group stage			
2026	(Australia) Graham Arnold	Group stage	Iraq 1–4 Norway	Loss	Hussein 39'
2026	(Australia) Graham Arnold	Group stage	Iraq 0–3 France	Loss	
2026	(Australia) Graham Arnold	Group stage	Iraq 0–5 Senegal	Loss	
First match: Iraq 0–1 Paraguay – 4 June 1986, Estadio Nemesio Díez, Toluca, Mexico; Biggest win: None; Biggest defeat: Iraq 0–5 Senegal – 26 June 2026, BMO Field, Toronto, Canada; Best finish: Group stage (1986, 2026); Worst finish: Group stage (1986, 2026); Overall top scorer: Ahmed Radhi and Aymen Hussein (1 goal each); Most goals in a single tournament: 1 goal — Ahmed Radhi (1986), Aymen Hussein (2026)

=== AFC Asian Cup ===
AFC Asian Cup record										Qualification record					
Year	Round	Position	Pld	W	D*	L	GF	GA	Squad	Pld	W	D	L	GF	GA
1956 to 1968	Not an AFC member									Not an AFC member					
(Thailand) 1972	Group stage	6th	3	0	2	1	1	4	Squad	6	5	1	0	13	2
(Iran) 1976	Fourth place	4th	4	1	0	3	3	6	Squad	6	5	1	0	14	3
(Kuwait) 1980	Withdrew									Withdrew					
(Singapore) 1984	Withdrew									Withdrew					
(Qatar) 1988	Withdrew									Withdrew					
(Japan) 1992	Banned due to Gulf War									Banned due to Gulf War					
(United Arab Emirates) 1996	Quarter-finals	6th	4	2	0	2	6	4	Squad	2	2	0	0	4	0
(Lebanon) 2000	Quarter-finals	8th	4	1	1	2	5	7	Squad	3	3	0	0	9	2
(China) 2004	Quarter-finals	8th	4	2	0	2	5	7	Squad	6	4	1	1	16	4
(Indonesia) (Malaysia) (Thailand) (Vietnam) 2007	Champions	1st	6	3	3	0	7	2	Squad	6	3	2	1	12	8
(Qatar) 2011	Quarter-finals	8th	4	2	0	2	3	3	Squad	Qualified as defending champions					
(Australia) 2015	Fourth place	4th	6	2	1	3	8	9	Squad	6	3	0	3	7	6
(United Arab Emirates) 2019	Round of 16	14th	4	2	1	1	6	3	Squad	6	3	3	0	13	6
(Qatar) 2023	Round of 16	12th	4	3	0	1	10	7	Squad	8	5	2	1	14	4
(Saudi Arabia) 2027	Qualified									6	6	0	0	17	2
Total	1 Title	11/15	43	18	8	17	54	52	—	55	39	10	6	119	37
Champions Runners-up Third place Fourth place *Draws include knockout matches decided via penalty shoot-out.

AFC Asian Cup history
Year	Manager	Round	Score	Result	Goalscorers for Iraq
1972	(Iraq) Abdelilah Mohammed Hassan	Group allocation matches			
1972	(Iraq) Abdelilah Mohammed Hassan	Group allocation matches	Iraq 0–0 (a.e.t.) (4–2 p) South Korea	Draw	
1972	(Iraq) Abdelilah Mohammed Hassan	Group stage			
1972	(Iraq) Abdelilah Mohammed Hassan	Group stage	Iraq 0–3 Iran	Loss	
1972	(Iraq) Abdelilah Mohammed Hassan	Group stage	Iraq 1–1 Thailand	Draw	Yousif 6'
1976	(Socialist Federal Republic of Yugoslavia) Lenko Grčić	Group stage			
1976	(Socialist Federal Republic of Yugoslavia) Lenko Grčić	Group stage	Iraq 0–2 Iran	Loss	
1976	(Socialist Federal Republic of Yugoslavia) Lenko Grčić	Group stage	Iraq 1–0 South Yemen	Win	Waal 84'
1976	(Socialist Federal Republic of Yugoslavia) Lenko Grčić	Semi-finals			
1976	(Socialist Federal Republic of Yugoslavia) Lenko Grčić	Semi-finals	Iraq 2–3 (a.e.t.) Kuwait	Loss	Abdul-Jalil 46', Hassan 85'
1976	(Socialist Federal Republic of Yugoslavia) Lenko Grčić	Third place match			
1976	(Socialist Federal Republic of Yugoslavia) Lenko Grčić	Third place match	Iraq 0–1 China	Loss	
1996	(Iraq) Yahya Alwan	Group stage			
1996	(Iraq) Yahya Alwan	Group stage	Iraq 2–1 Iran	Win	Fawzi 37', Sabbar 69'
1996	(Iraq) Yahya Alwan	Group stage	Iraq 0–1 Saudi Arabia	Loss	
1996	(Iraq) Yahya Alwan	Group stage	Iraq 4–1 Thailand	Win	H. Mahmoud 17', 50', L. Hussein 23', 63'
1996	(Iraq) Yahya Alwan	Quarter-finals			
1996	(Iraq) Yahya Alwan	Quarter-finals	Iraq 0–1 (a.e.t.) United Arab Emirates	Loss	
2000	(Federal Republic of Yugoslavia) Milan Živadinović	Group stage			
2000	(Federal Republic of Yugoslavia) Milan Živadinović	Group stage	Iraq 2–0 Thailand	Win	Chathir 27', H. Mahmoud 60'
2000	(Federal Republic of Yugoslavia) Milan Živadinović	Group stage	Iraq 2–2 Lebanon	Draw	Jeayer 5', 22'
2000	(Federal Republic of Yugoslavia) Milan Živadinović	Group stage	Iraq 0–1 Iran	Loss	
2000	(Federal Republic of Yugoslavia) Milan Živadinović	Quarter-finals			
2000	(Federal Republic of Yugoslavia) Milan Živadinović	Quarter-finals	Iraq 1–4 Japan	Loss	Obeid 4'
2004	(Iraq) Adnan Hamad	Group stage			
2004	(Iraq) Adnan Hamad	Group stage	Iraq 0–1 Uzbekistan	Loss	
2004	(Iraq) Adnan Hamad	Group stage	Iraq 3–2 Turkmenistan	Win	Mohammed 12', Farhan 80', Munir 88'
2004	(Iraq) Adnan Hamad	Group stage	Iraq 2–1 Saudi Arabia	Win	Akram 51', Y. Mahmoud 86'
2004	(Iraq) Adnan Hamad	Quarter-finals			
2004	(Iraq) Adnan Hamad	Quarter-finals	Iraq 0–3 China	Loss	
2007	(Brazil) Jorvan Vieira	Group stage			
2007	(Brazil) Jorvan Vieira	Group stage	Iraq 1–1 Thailand	Draw	Y. Mahmoud 32'
2007	(Brazil) Jorvan Vieira	Group stage	Iraq 3–1 Australia	Win	Akram 22', Mohammed 60', K. Jassim 86'
2007	(Brazil) Jorvan Vieira	Group stage	Iraq 0–0 Oman	Draw	
2007	(Brazil) Jorvan Vieira	Quarter-finals			
2007	(Brazil) Jorvan Vieira	Quarter-finals	Iraq 2–0 Vietnam	Win	Y. Mahmoud 2', 65'
2007	(Brazil) Jorvan Vieira	Semi-finals			
2007	(Brazil) Jorvan Vieira	Semi-finals	Iraq 0–0 (a.e.t.) (4–3 p) South Korea	Draw	
2007	(Brazil) Jorvan Vieira	Final			
2007	(Brazil) Jorvan Vieira	Final	Iraq 1–0 Saudi Arabia	Win	Y. Mahmoud 72'
2011	(Germany) Wolfgang Sidka	Group stage			
2011	(Germany) Wolfgang Sidka	Group stage	Iraq 1–2 Iran	Loss	Y. Mahmoud 13'
2011	(Germany) Wolfgang Sidka	Group stage	Iraq 1–0 United Arab Emirates	Win	W. Abbas 90+3' (o.g.)
2011	(Germany) Wolfgang Sidka	Group stage	Iraq 1–0 North Korea	Win	Jassim 22'
2011	(Germany) Wolfgang Sidka	Quarter-finals			
2011	(Germany) Wolfgang Sidka	Quarter-finals	Iraq 0–1 (a.e.t.) Australia	Loss	
2015	(Iraq) Radhi Shenaishil	Group stage			
2015	(Iraq) Radhi Shenaishil	Group stage	Iraq 1–0 Jordan	Win	Kasim 77'
2015	(Iraq) Radhi Shenaishil	Group stage	Iraq 0–1 Japan	Loss	
2015	(Iraq) Radhi Shenaishil	Group stage	Iraq 2–0 Palestine	Win	Y. Mahmoud 48', Yasin 88'
2015	(Iraq) Radhi Shenaishil	Quarter-finals			
2015	(Iraq) Radhi Shenaishil	Quarter-finals	Iraq 3–3 (a.e.t.) (7–6 p) Iran	Draw	Yasin 56', Y. Mahmoud 93', Ismail 116' (pen.)
2015	(Iraq) Radhi Shenaishil	Semi-finals			
2015	(Iraq) Radhi Shenaishil	Semi-finals	Iraq 0–2 South Korea	Loss	
2015	(Iraq) Radhi Shenaishil	Third place match			
2015	(Iraq) Radhi Shenaishil	Third place match	Iraq 2–3 United Arab Emirates	Loss	Salim 28', Kalaf 42'
2019	(Slovenia) Srečko Katanec	Group stage			
2019	(Slovenia) Srečko Katanec	Group stage	Iraq 3–2 Vietnam	Win	Ali 35', Tariq 60', Adnan 90'
2019	(Slovenia) Srečko Katanec	Group stage	Iraq 3–0 Yemen	Win	Ali 11', Resan 19', Abbas 90+1'
2019	(Slovenia) Srečko Katanec	Group stage	Iraq 0–0 Iran	Draw	
2019	(Slovenia) Srečko Katanec	Round of 16			
2019	(Slovenia) Srečko Katanec	Round of 16	Iraq 0–1 Qatar	Loss	
2023	(Spain) Jesús Casas	Group stage			
2023	(Spain) Jesús Casas	Group stage	Iraq 3–1 Indonesia	Win	Ali 17', Rashid 45+7', A. Hussein 75'
2023	(Spain) Jesús Casas	Group stage	Iraq 2–1 Japan	Win	A. Hussein 5', 45+4'
2023	(Spain) Jesús Casas	Group stage	Iraq 3–2 Vietnam	Win	Sulaka 47', A. Hussein 73', 90+12' (pen.)
2023	(Spain) Jesús Casas	Round of 16			
2023	(Spain) Jesús Casas	Round of 16	Iraq 2–3 Jordan	Loss	Natiq 68', A. Hussein 76'
First match: Iraq 0–0 South Korea – 7 May 1972, National Stadium, Bangkok, Thailand; Biggest win: Iraq 4–1 Thailand – 11 December 1996 and Iraq 3–0 Yemen – 12 January 2019; Biggest defeat: Iraq 0–3 Iran – 9 May 1972 and Iraq 1–4 Japan – 24 October 2000 and Iraq 0–3 China – 30 July 2004; Best finish: Champions (2007); Worst finish: Group stage (1972); Overall top scorer: Younis Mahmoud (8 goals); Most goals in a single tournament: Aymen Hussein (6 goals, 2023); Draws include knockout matches decided via penalty shoot-out.

=== FIFA Confederations Cup ===
FIFA Confederations Cup record
Year	Round	Position	Pld	W	D	L	GF	GA	Squad
1992	Did not enter								
1995	Banned due to Gulf War								
1997	Did not qualify								
1999	Did not qualify								
2001	Did not qualify								
2003	Did not qualify								
2005	Did not qualify								
2009	Group stage	7th	3	0	2	1	0	1	Squad
2013	Did not qualify								
2017	Did not qualify								
Total	Best: Group stage	1/10	3	0	2	1	0	1	—

FIFA Confederations Cup history
Year	Manager	Round	Score	Result	Goalscorers for Iraq
2009	(Serbia) Bora Milutinović	Group stage	Iraq 0–0 South Africa	Draw	
2009	(Serbia) Bora Milutinović	Group stage	Iraq 0–1 Spain	Loss	
2009	(Serbia) Bora Milutinović	Group stage	Iraq 0–0 New Zealand	Draw	
First match: Iraq 0–0 South Africa – 14 June 2009, Ellis Park Stadium, Johannesburg, South Africa; Biggest win: None; Biggest defeat: Iraq 0–1 Spain – 17 June 2009, Free State Stadium, Bloemfontein, South Africa; Best finish: Group stage (2009); Worst finish: Group stage (2009); Overall top scorer: None; Most goals in a single tournament: None

=== Summer Olympics ===
Summer Olympics record										Qualification record					
Year	Round	Position	Pld	W	D	L	GF	GA	Squad	Pld	W	D	L	GF	GA
1900 to 1936	Not an IOC member									Not an IOC member					
1948 to 1956	Did not enter									Did not enter					
1960	Did not qualify									4	2	0	2	14	10
1964	Did not qualify									2	0	1	1	0	4
1968	Did not qualify									4	1	1	2	7	5
1972	Did not qualify									5	3	0	2	4	5
1976	Did not qualify									4	2	0	2	6	4
1980	Quarter-finals	8th	4	1	2	1	4	5	Squad	5	3	1	1	10	3
1984	Group stage	14th	3	0	1	2	3	6	Squad	8	4	3	1	10	7
1988	Group stage	10th	3	1	1	1	5	4	Squad	8	6	1	1	14	6
1992 to present	See Iraq national under-23 football team									See Iraq national under-23 football team					
Total	Quarter-finals	3/11	10	2	4	4	12	15	—	40	21	7	12	65	44

Summer Olympics history
Year	Manager	Round	Score	Result	Goalscorers for Iraq
1980	(Iraq) Anwar Jassam	Group stage			
1980	(Iraq) Anwar Jassam	Group stage	Iraq 3–0 Costa Rica	Win	Ahmed 45', Saeed 49', Hassan 75'
1980	(Iraq) Anwar Jassam	Group stage	Iraq 0–0 Finland	Draw	
1980	(Iraq) Anwar Jassam	Group stage	Iraq 1–1 Yugoslavia	Draw	Hassan 61'
1980	(Iraq) Anwar Jassam	Quarter-finals			
1980	(Iraq) Anwar Jassam	Quarter-finals	Iraq 0–4 East Germany	Loss	
1984	(Iraq) Ammo Baba	Group stage			
1984	(Iraq) Ammo Baba	Group stage	Iraq 1–1 Canada	Draw	Saeed 83'
1984	(Iraq) Ammo Baba	Group stage	Iraq 0–1 Cameroon	Loss	
1984	(Iraq) Ammo Baba	Group stage	Iraq 2–4 Yugoslavia	Loss	Saeed 17', Shihab 43'
1988	(Iraq) Ammo Baba	Group stage			
1988	(Iraq) Ammo Baba	Group stage	Iraq 2–2 Zambia	Draw	Radhi 36' (pen.), Allawi 71'
1988	(Iraq) Ammo Baba	Group stage	Iraq 3–0 Guatemala	Win	Radhi 57', Jabbar 67', Mazariegos 77' (o.g.)
1988	(Iraq) Ammo Baba	Group stage	Iraq 0–2 Italy	Loss	
1992–present
1992–present	See Iraq national under-23 football team				
First match: Iraq 3–0 Costa Rica – 21 July 1980, Republican Stadium, Kyiv, Soviet Union; Biggest win: Iraq 3–0 Costa Rica – 21 July 1980 and Iraq 3–0 Guatemala – 19 September 1988; Biggest defeat: Iraq 0–4 East Germany – 27 July 1980, Republican Stadium, Kyiv, Soviet Union; Best finish: Quarter-finals (1980); Worst finish: Group stage (1984, 1988); Overall top scorer: Hussein Saeed (3 goals); Most goals in a single tournament: 2 goals — Falah Hassan (1980), Hussein Saeed (1984), Ahmed Radhi (1988)

=== Asian Games ===
Asian Games record
Year	Round	Position	Pld	W	D*	L	GF	GA	Squad
1951 to 1970	Did not enter								
1974	Second round	5th	6	3	2	1	6	2	Squad
1978	Fourth place	4th	7	4	1	2	11	4	Squad
1982	Gold medalists	1st	6	5	0	1	11	2	Squad
1986	Quarter-finals	6th	5	3	1	1	13	5	Squad
1990 to 1998	Banned due to Gulf War								
2002 to present	See Iraq national under-23 football team								
Total	1 Title	4/13	24	15	4	5	41	13	—

Asian Games history
Year	Manager	Round	Score	Result	Goalscorers for Iraq
1974	(Iraq) Thamir Muhsin	First round			
1974	(Iraq) Thamir Muhsin	First round	Iraq 3–0 India	Win	Jassam 19', Hassan 27', Kadhim 58'
1974	(Iraq) Thamir Muhsin	First round	Iraq 1–0 North Korea	Win	Jassam 73'
1974	(Iraq) Thamir Muhsin	First round	Iraq 1–0 China	Win	Hatim 24'
1974	(Iraq) Thamir Muhsin	Second round			
1974	(Iraq) Thamir Muhsin	Second round	Iraq 1–1 South Korea	Draw	Jassam 74'
1974	(Iraq) Thamir Muhsin	Second round	Iraq 0–0 Malaysia	Draw	
1974	(Iraq) Thamir Muhsin	Second round	Iraq 0–1 Iran	Loss	
1978	(Iraq) Ammo Baba	First round			
1978	(Iraq) Ammo Baba	First round	Iraq 2–1 Qatar	Win	Subhi 35', Farhan 90'
1978	(Iraq) Ammo Baba	First round	Iraq 2–0 China	Win	Saeed 44', 62' (o.g.)
1978	(Iraq) Ammo Baba	First round	Iraq 1–1 Saudi Arabia	Draw	Ali 53' (pen.)
1978	(Iraq) Ammo Baba	Second round			
1978	(Iraq) Ammo Baba	Second round	Iraq 0–1 North Korea	Loss	
1978	(Iraq) Ammo Baba	Second round	Iraq 3–0 Kuwait	Win	Mahmoud 40', Saeed 55', Abdul-Sahib 85'
1978	(Iraq) Ammo Baba	Second round	Iraq 3–0 India	Win	Mahmoud 20', Shaker 25', Saeed 63'
1978	(Iraq) Ammo Baba	Bronze medal match			
1978	(Iraq) Ammo Baba	Bronze medal match	Iraq 0–1 China	Loss	
1982	(Iraq) Ammo Baba	Group stage			
1982	(Iraq) Ammo Baba	Group stage	Iraq 4–0 Burma	Win	Hashim 10', Saeed 32', Shihab 54', Mohammed 86'
1982	(Iraq) Ammo Baba	Group stage	Iraq 3–0 Nepal	Win	Odisho 3', Saeed 56', 75'
1982	(Iraq) Ammo Baba	Group stage	Iraq 1–2 Kuwait	Loss	Shihab 73'
1982	(Iraq) Ammo Baba	Quarter-finals			
1982	(Iraq) Ammo Baba	Quarter-finals	Iraq 1–0 (a.e.t.) Japan	Win	Jassim 102'
1982	(Iraq) Ammo Baba	Semi-finals			
1982	(Iraq) Ammo Baba	Semi-finals	Iraq 1–0 Saudi Arabia	Win	Mohammed 17'
1982	(Iraq) Ammo Baba	Final			
1982	(Iraq) Ammo Baba	Final	Iraq 1–0 Kuwait	Win	Saeed 82'
1986	(Iraq) Akram Salman	Group stage			
1986	(Iraq) Akram Salman	Group stage	Iraq 4–0 Oman	Win	Allawi 12', 70', Saeed 29', Radhi 80'
1986	(Iraq) Akram Salman	Group stage	Iraq 5–1 Pakistan	Win	Radhi 14' (pen.), 36', Hameed 21', Mohammed 34', 86'
1986	(Iraq) Akram Salman	Group stage	Iraq 1–2 United Arab Emirates	Loss	Saeed 84'
1986	(Iraq) Akram Salman	Group stage	Iraq 2–1 Thailand	Win	Dirjal 50', Mohammed 79'
1986	(Iraq) Akram Salman	Quarter-finals			
1986	(Iraq) Akram Salman	Quarter-finals	Iraq 1–1 (a.e.t.) (8–9 p) Saudi Arabia	Draw	Mohammed 51'
2002–present
2002–present	See Iraq national under-23 football team				
First match: Iraq 3–0 India – 2 September 1974, Amjadieh Stadium, Tehran, Iran; Biggest win: Iraq 4–0 Burma – 21 November 1982 and Iraq 4–0 Oman – 21 September 1986 and Iraq 5–1 Pakistan – 23 September 1986; Biggest defeat: Iraq 0–1 Iran – 13 September 1974 and Iraq 0–1 North Korea – 17 December 1978 and Iraq 0–1 China – 20 December 1978 and Iraq 1–2 Kuwait – 25 November 1982 and Iraq 1–2 United Arab Emirates – 25 September 1986; Best finish: Gold medalists (1982); Worst finish: Second round (1974), Quarter-finals (1986); Overall top scorer: Hussein Saeed (9 goals); Most goals in a single tournament: 4 goals — Hussein Saeed (1982), Haris Mohammed (1986)

=== Regional competitions ===
==== WAFF Championship ====
WAFF Championship record
Year	Result	Pld	W	D*	L	GF	GA	Squad
2000	Third place	5	3	2	0	10	2	Squad
2002	Champions	4	3	1	0	6	2	Squad
2004	Fourth place	4	1	0	3	4	8	Squad
2007	Runners-up	4	2	1	1	5	2	Squad
2008	Withdrew							
2010	Semi-finals	3	2	0	1	6	3	Squad
2012	Runners-up	4	2	1	1	4	2	Squad
2013	Group stage	2	0	2	0	0	0	Squad
2019	Runners-up	5	3	1	1	5	3	Squad
2026	Qualified							
Total	1 Title	31	16	8	7	40	22	—

WAFF Championship history
Year	Manager	Round	Score	Result	Goalscorers for Iraq
2000	(Iraq) Adnan Hamad	Group stage			
2000	(Iraq) Adnan Hamad	Group stage	Iraq 2–1 Lebanon	Win	Obeid 63' (pen.), Fawzi 66'
2000	(Iraq) Adnan Hamad	Group stage	Iraq 0–0 Jordan	Draw	
2000	(Iraq) Adnan Hamad	Group stage	Iraq 4–0 Kyrgyzstan	Win	Farhan 28', 35', 75', H. Mohammed 67'
2000	(Iraq) Adnan Hamad	Semi-finals			
2000	(Iraq) Adnan Hamad	Semi-finals	Iraq 0–0 (a.e.t.) (3–5 p) Syria	Draw	
2000	(Iraq) Adnan Hamad	Third place match			
2000	(Iraq) Adnan Hamad	Third place match	Iraq 4–1 Jordan	Win	Farhan 16', 74', Kadhim 30', Hadi 37'
2002	(Iraq) Adnan Hamad	Group stage			
2002	(Iraq) Adnan Hamad	Group stage	Iraq 2–0 Palestine	Win	Wahaib 47', Farhan 69'
2002	(Iraq) Adnan Hamad	Group stage	Iraq 1–0 Syria	Win	Kadhim 43'
2002	(Iraq) Adnan Hamad	Semi-finals			
2002	(Iraq) Adnan Hamad	Semi-finals	Iraq 0–0 (a.e.t.) (6–5 p) Iran	Draw	
2002	(Iraq) Adnan Hamad	Final			
2002	(Iraq) Adnan Hamad	Final	Iraq 3–2 (a.e.t.) Jordan	Win	Farhan 32', Y. Mahmoud 89', H. Mahmoud 103'
2004	(Germany) Bernd Stange	Group stage			
2004	(Germany) Bernd Stange	Group stage	Iraq 2–1 Palestine	Win	E. Mohammed 41', 83'
2004	(Germany) Bernd Stange	Group stage	Iraq 0–2 Jordan	Loss	
2004	(Germany) Bernd Stange	Semi-finals			
2004	(Germany) Bernd Stange	Semi-finals	Iraq 1–2 Iran	Loss	Mnajed 30'
2004	(Germany) Bernd Stange	Third place match			
2004	(Germany) Bernd Stange	Third place match	Iraq 1–3 Jordan	Loss	E. Mohammed 81'
2007	(Brazil) Jorvan Vieira	Group stage			
2007	(Brazil) Jorvan Vieira	Group stage	Iraq 0–0 Iran	Draw	
2007	(Brazil) Jorvan Vieira	Group stage	Iraq 1–0 Palestine	Win	H. M. Mohammed 86'
2007	(Brazil) Jorvan Vieira	Semi-finals			
2007	(Brazil) Jorvan Vieira	Semi-finals	Iraq 3–0 Syria	Win	Y. Mahmoud 10' (pen.), Mnajed 42', Sadir 85'
2007	(Brazil) Jorvan Vieira	Final			
2007	(Brazil) Jorvan Vieira	Final	Iraq 1–2 Iran	Loss	Sadir 86' (pen.)
2010	(Germany) Wolfgang Sidka	Group stage			
2010	(Germany) Wolfgang Sidka	Group stage	Iraq 2–1 Yemen	Win	Saeed 49', H. M. Mohammed 72'
2010	(Germany) Wolfgang Sidka	Group stage	Iraq 3–0 Palestine	Win	Karim 15', 76', Akram 86' (pen.)
2010	(Germany) Wolfgang Sidka	Semi-finals			
2010	(Germany) Wolfgang Sidka	Semi-finals	Iraq 1–2 Iran	Loss	Karim 71'
2012	(Iraq) Hakeem Shaker	Group stage			
2012	(Iraq) Hakeem Shaker	Group stage	Iraq 1–0 Jordan	Win	Ahmed 62'
2012	(Iraq) Hakeem Shaker	Group stage	Iraq 1–1 Syria	Draw	Al Masri 11' (o.g.)
2012	(Iraq) Hakeem Shaker	Semi-finals			
2012	(Iraq) Hakeem Shaker	Semi-finals	Iraq 2–0 Oman	Win	Radhi 6', Yasin 39'
2012	(Iraq) Hakeem Shaker	Final			
2012	(Iraq) Hakeem Shaker	Final	Iraq 0–1 Syria	Loss	
2013	(Iraq) Hadi Mutanash	Group stage			
2013	(Iraq) Hadi Mutanash	Group stage	Iraq 0–0 Bahrain	Draw	
2013	(Iraq) Hadi Mutanash	Group stage	Iraq 0–0 Oman	Draw	
2019	(Slovenia) Srečko Katanec	Group stage			
2019	(Slovenia) Srečko Katanec	Group stage	Iraq 1–0 Lebanon	Win	Ali 57'
2019	(Slovenia) Srečko Katanec	Group stage	Iraq 2–1 Palestine	Win	Abdul-Raheem 22', Ali 83' (pen.)
2019	(Slovenia) Srečko Katanec	Group stage	Iraq 0–0 Syria	Draw	
2019	(Slovenia) Srečko Katanec	Group stage	Iraq 2–1 Yemen	Win	Bayesh 26', Ali 31' (pen.)
2019	(Slovenia) Srečko Katanec	Final			
2019	(Slovenia) Srečko Katanec	Final	Iraq 0–1 Bahrain	Loss	
First match: Iraq 2–1 Lebanon – 23 May 2000, King Abdullah II Stadium, Amman, Jordan; Biggest win: Iraq 4–0 Kyrgyzstan – 27 May 2000, King Abdullah II Stadium, Amman, Jordan; Biggest defeat: Iraq 0–2 Jordan – 21 June 2004 and Iraq 1–3 Jordan – 25 June 2004; Best finish: Champions (2002); Worst finish: Group stage (2013); Overall top scorer: Razzaq Farhan (7 goals); Most goals in a single tournament: Razzaq Farhan (5 goals, 2000)

==== Arab Cup ====
FIFA Arab Cup record									Qualification record					
Year	Result	Pld	W	D*	L	GF	GA	Squad	Pld	W	D	L	GF	GA
1963	Did not enter								No qualifying tournament					
1964	Champions	4	3	1	0	6	2	Squad	No qualifying tournament					
1966	Champions	6	5	1	0	20	5	Squad	No qualifying tournament					
1985	Champions	4	3	1	0	7	3	Squad	1	0	0	1	2	3
1988	Champions	6	2	4	0	7	2	Squad	Qualified as defending champions					
1992 to 2002	Banned due to Gulf War								Banned due to Gulf War					
2012	Third place	5	3	1	1	6	4	Squad	No qualifying tournament					
2021	Group stage	3	0	2	1	1	4	Squad	Qualified automatically					
2025	Quarter-finals	4	2	0	2	4	4	Squad	Qualified automatically					
Total	4 Titles	32	18	10	4	51	24	—	1	0	0	1	2	3

Arab Cup history
Year	Manager	Round	Score	Result	Goalscorers for Iraq
1964	(Iraq) Adil Basher	Round-robin			
1964	(Iraq) Adil Basher	Round-robin	Iraq 1–0 Kuwait	Win	S. Ismail 60'
1964	(Iraq) Adil Basher	Round-robin	Iraq 1–0 Lebanon	Win	Tabra 25'
1964	(Iraq) Adil Basher	Round-robin	Iraq 1–1 Libya	Draw	Atta 70'
1964	(Iraq) Adil Basher	Round-robin	Iraq 3–1 Jordan	Win	Atta 15', 37', Q. Mahmoud 31'
1966	(Iraq) Adil Basher	Group stage			
1966	(Iraq) Adil Basher	Group stage	Iraq 3–1 Kuwait	Win	Yousif 19', Dhiab 28', Atta 78'
1966	(Iraq) Adil Basher	Group stage	Iraq 2–1 Jordan	Win	Assad 2', Atta 82'
1966	(Iraq) Adil Basher	Group stage	Iraq 10–1 Bahrain	Win	G. Ismail 6', Dhiab 18', 42', 49', 66', Jameel 25', 55', Dawood 35', Hameed 39', Najim
1966	(Iraq) Adil Basher	Group stage	Iraq 0–0 Lebanon	Draw	
1966	(Iraq) Adil Basher	Semi-finals			
1966	(Iraq) Adil Basher	Semi-finals	Iraq 3–1 Libya	Win	Q. Mahmoud 12', Balah 22' (pen.), Atta 74'
1966	(Iraq) Adil Basher	Final			
1966	(Iraq) Adil Basher	Final	Iraq 2–1 Syria	Win	G. Ismail 65', 81'
1985	(Iraq) Anwar Jassam	Group stage			
1985	(Iraq) Anwar Jassam	Group stage	Iraq 1–1 Bahrain	Draw	Abid 42'
1985	(Iraq) Anwar Jassam	Group stage	Iraq 2–0 Mauritania	Win	S. Mahmoud 42', Abid 60'
1985	(Iraq) Anwar Jassam	Semi-finals			
1985	(Iraq) Anwar Jassam	Semi-finals	Iraq 3–2 Saudi Arabia	Win	Abid 13', 18', Rashid 28'
1985	(Iraq) Anwar Jassam	Final			
1985	(Iraq) Anwar Jassam	Final	Iraq 1–0 Bahrain	Win	Abid 21'
1988	(Iraq) Jamal Salih	Group stage			
1988	(Iraq) Jamal Salih	Group stage	Iraq 1–1 Tunisia	Draw	Radhi 32'
1988	(Iraq) Jamal Salih	Group stage	Iraq 0–0 Lebanon	Draw	
1988	(Iraq) Ammo Baba	Group stage			
1988	(Iraq) Ammo Baba	Group stage	Iraq 2–0 Saudi Arabia	Win	Radhi 13', 35'
1988	(Iraq) Ammo Baba	Group stage	Iraq 0–0 Egypt	Draw	
1988	(Iraq) Ammo Baba	Semi-finals			
1988	(Iraq) Ammo Baba	Semi-finals	Iraq 3–0 Jordan	Win	Radhi 22', Abed Ali 45', Mohammed 80'
1988	(Iraq) Ammo Baba	Final			
1988	(Iraq) Ammo Baba	Final	Iraq 1–1 (a.e.t.) (4–3 p) Syria	Draw	Gorgis 34'
2012	(Brazil) Zico	Group stage			
2012	(Brazil) Zico	Group stage	Iraq 1–0 Lebanon	Win	Karim 89'
2012	(Brazil) Zico	Group stage	Iraq 2–1 Egypt	Win	Karim 49', Abdul-Zahra 75'
2012	(Brazil) Zico	Group stage	Iraq 1–1 Sudan	Draw	Shaker 5'
2012	(Brazil) Zico	Semi-finals			
2012	(Brazil) Zico	Semi-finals	Iraq 1–2 Morocco	Loss	Karim 90+6' (pen.)
2012	(Brazil) Zico	Third place match			
2012	(Brazil) Zico	Third place match	Iraq 1–0 Saudi Arabia	Win	Abdul-Zahra 16'
2021	(Montenegro) Željko Petrović	Group stage			
2021	(Montenegro) Željko Petrović	Group stage	Iraq 1–1 Oman	Draw	Abdulkareem 90+8' (pen.)
2021	(Montenegro) Željko Petrović	Group stage	Iraq 0–0 Bahrain	Draw	
2021	(Montenegro) Željko Petrović	Group stage	Iraq 0–3 Qatar	Loss	
2025	(Australia) Graham Arnold	Group stage			
2025	(Australia) Graham Arnold	Group stage	Iraq 2–1 Bahrain	Win	Lutfalla 10' (o.g.), Ali 25'
2025	(Australia) Graham Arnold	Group stage	Iraq 2–0 Sudan	Win	Ali 81', Attwan 84'
2025	(Australia) Graham Arnold	Group stage	Iraq 0–2 Algeria	Loss	
2025	(Australia) Graham Arnold	Quarter-finals			
2025	(Australia) Graham Arnold	Quarter-finals	Iraq 0–1 Jordan	Loss	
First match: Iraq 1–0 Kuwait – 13 November 1964, Shuwaikh High School Stadium, Kuwait City, Kuwait; Biggest win: Iraq 10–1 Bahrain – 5 April 1966, Al-Kashafa Stadium, Baghdad, Iraq; Biggest defeat: Iraq 0–3 Qatar – 6 December 2021, Al Bayt Stadium, Al Khor, Qatar; Best finish: Champions (1964, 1966, 1985, 1988); Worst finish: Group stage (2021); Overall top scorer: Hisham Atta (6 goals); Most goals in a single tournament: Nouri Dhiab (5 goals, 1966); Draws include knockout matches decided via penalty shoot-out.

==== Arabian Gulf Cup ====
Arabian Gulf Cup record
Year	Result	Pld	W	D*	L	GF	GA	Squad
1970 to 1974	Did not enter							
1976	Runners-up	7	4	2	1	23	8	Squad
1979	Champions	6	6	0	0	23	1	Squad
1982	Withdrew	5	4	1	0	11	2	Squad
1984	Champions	7	4	2	1	12	5	Squad
1986	Sixth place	6	1	3	2	8	9	Squad
1988	Champions	6	4	2	0	8	1	Squad
1990	Withdrew	3	1	2	0	4	3	Squad
1992 to 2003–04	Banned due to Gulf War							
2004	Group stage	3	0	2	1	5	7	Squad
2007	Group stage	3	1	1	1	2	2	Squad
2009	Group stage	3	0	1	2	2	8	Squad
2010	Semi-finals	4	1	3	0	5	4	Squad
2013	Runners-up	5	3	1	1	7	3	Squad
2014	Group stage	3	0	1	2	1	4	Squad
2017–18	Semi-finals	4	2	2	0	6	2	Squad
2019	Semi-finals	4	2	2	0	6	3	Squad
2023	Champions	5	4	1	0	12	3	Squad
2024–25	Group stage	3	1	0	2	2	5	Squad
2026	Group stage	3	1	1	1	4	5	Squad
2028	To be determined							
Total	4 Titles	80	39	27	14	141	75	—

Arabian Gulf Cup history
Year	Manager	Round	Score	Result	Goalscorers for Iraq
1976	(Scotland) Danny McLennan	Round-robin			
1976	(Scotland) Danny McLennan	Round-robin	Iraq 4–0 Oman	Win	Hassan 33', Kadhim 68', 80', Nasser 69' (o.g.)
1976	(Scotland) Danny McLennan	Round-robin	Iraq 4–1 Bahrain	Win	Waal 11', Hassan 23', Abdul-Jalil 50', Kadhim 65'
1976	(Scotland) Danny McLennan	Round-robin	Iraq 7–1 Saudi Arabia	Win	Waal 3', Abdul-Jalil 6', Hassan 25', Kadhim 45', 60', 68', Subhi 89'
1976	(Scotland) Danny McLennan	Round-robin	Iraq 0–0 Qatar	Draw	
1976	(Scotland) Danny McLennan	Round-robin	Iraq 4–0 (United Arab Emirates) UAE	Win	A. H. Mahmoud 11', Kadhim 34' (pen.), Abdul-Jalil 43', Fartous 44'
1976	(Scotland) Danny McLennan	Round-robin	Iraq 2–2 Kuwait	Draw	Abdul-Jalil 46', Kadhim 49'
1976	(Scotland) Danny McLennan	Championship play-off			
1976	(Scotland) Danny McLennan	Championship play-off	Iraq 2–4 Kuwait	Loss	Subhi 9', 50'
1979	(Iraq) Ammo Baba	Round-robin			
1979	(Iraq) Ammo Baba	Round-robin	Iraq 4–0 Bahrain	Win	Saeed 48', 88', 90', N. Shaker 64'
1979	(Iraq) Ammo Baba	Round-robin	Iraq 2–0 Qatar	Win	Saeed 1', 60' (pen.)
1979	(Iraq) Ammo Baba	Round-robin	Iraq 3–1 Kuwait	Win	Hassan 9', Hadi Ahmed 47', Abdul-Sahib 90'
1979	(Iraq) Ammo Baba	Round-robin	Iraq 5–0 (United Arab Emirates) UAE	Win	Hadi Ahmed 25', Abdul-Sahib 40', Hassan 49', Saeed 66', Khudhair 85'
1979	(Iraq) Ammo Baba	Round-robin	Iraq 7–0 Oman	Win	Saeed 30', 32', 40', 86', Hassan 43', 50', Khudhair 52'
1979	(Iraq) Ammo Baba	Round-robin	Iraq 2–0 Saudi Arabia	Win	Hassan 24', H. Farhan 36'
1982	(Iraq) Ammo Baba	Round-robin (withdrew)			
1982	(Iraq) Ammo Baba	Round-robin (withdrew)	Iraq 4–0 Oman	Win	Saeed 24', Dirjal 32', 90', H. Farhan 75'
1982	(Iraq) Ammo Baba	Round-robin (withdrew)	Iraq 3–0 Bahrain	Win	Aziz 41', Saeed 84', 88'
1982	(Iraq) Ammo Baba	Round-robin (withdrew)	Iraq 1–1 Saudi Arabia	Draw	Saeed 84'
1982	(Iraq) Ammo Baba	Round-robin (withdrew)	Iraq 2–1 Qatar	Win	H. Mohammed 20', 29'
1982	(Iraq) Ammo Baba	Round-robin (withdrew)	Iraq 1–0 (United Arab Emirates) UAE	Win	Saeed 49'
1984	(Iraq) Ammo Baba	Round-robin			
1984	(Iraq) Ammo Baba	Round-robin	Iraq 2–1 Oman	Win	Saeed 25', 29'
1984	(Iraq) Ammo Baba	Round-robin	Iraq 0–0 (United Arab Emirates) UAE	Draw	
1984	(Iraq) Ammo Baba	Round-robin	Iraq 4–0 Saudi Arabia	Win	N. Shaker 25', Saeed 57', 70', 84'
1984	(Iraq) Ammo Baba	Round-robin	Iraq 1–0 Bahrain	Win	Hashim 66'
1984	(Iraq) Ammo Baba	Round-robin	Iraq 3–1 Kuwait	Win	Saeed 47', 75', Allawi 80'
1984	(Iraq) Ammo Baba	Round-robin	Iraq 1–2 Qatar	Loss	Radhi 55'
1984	(Iraq) Ammo Baba	Championship play-off			
1984	(Iraq) Ammo Baba	Championship play-off	Iraq 1–1 (a.e.t.) (3–2 p) Qatar	Draw	Dirjal 102'
1986	(Brazil) Zé Mário	Round-robin			
1986	(Brazil) Zé Mário	Round-robin	Iraq 0–0 Bahrain	Draw	
1986	(Brazil) Zé Mário	Round-robin	Iraq 2–2 (United Arab Emirates) UAE	Draw	Saddam 26', M. Hussein 62'
1986	(Brazil) Zé Mário	Round-robin	Iraq 1–1 Qatar	Draw	Jafar 61'
1986	(Brazil) Zé Mário	Round-robin	Iraq 1–2 Saudi Arabia	Loss	Saddam 75'
1986	(Brazil) Zé Mário	Round-robin	Iraq 1–2 Kuwait	Loss	Jassim 74'
1986	(Brazil) Zé Mário	Round-robin	Iraq 3–2 Oman	Win	Hameed 27', 58', 89'
1988	(Iraq) Ammo Baba	Round-robin			
1988	(Iraq) Ammo Baba	Round-robin	Iraq 1–1 Oman	Draw	Shihab 50'
1988	(Iraq) Ammo Baba	Round-robin	Iraq 1–0 Kuwait	Win	Radhi 39'
1988	(Iraq) Ammo Baba	Round-robin	Iraq 0–0 (United Arab Emirates) UAE	Draw	
1988	(Iraq) Ammo Baba	Round-robin	Iraq 3–0 Qatar	Win	Jafar 58', Radhi 80', 81'
1988	(Iraq) Ammo Baba	Round-robin	Iraq 2–0 Saudi Arabia	Win	Radhi 59', Gorgis 72'
1988	(Iraq) Ammo Baba	Round-robin	Iraq 1–0 Bahrain	Win	L. Hussein 49'
1990	(Iraq) Anwar Jassam	Round-robin (withdrew)			
1990	(Iraq) Anwar Jassam	Round-robin (withdrew)	Iraq 1–0 Bahrain	Win	Jafar 39'
1990	(Iraq) Anwar Jassam	Round-robin (withdrew)	Iraq 1–1 Kuwait	Draw	L. Hussein 67'
1990	(Iraq) Anwar Jassam	Round-robin (withdrew)	Iraq 2–2 (United Arab Emirates) UAE	Draw	Radhi 25', Qais 88' (pen.)
2004	(Iraq) Adnan Hamad	Group stage			
2004	(Iraq) Adnan Hamad	Group stage	Iraq 1–3 Oman	Loss	R. Farhan 56'
2004	(Iraq) Adnan Hamad	Group stage	Iraq 3–3 Qatar	Draw	R. Farhan 16', Akram 54', Abdul-Amir 90+2'
2004	(Iraq) Adnan Hamad	Group stage	Iraq 1–1 (United Arab Emirates) UAE	Draw	Munir 90+2' (pen.)
2007	(Iraq) Akram Salman	Group stage			
2007	(Iraq) Akram Salman	Group stage	Iraq 1–0 Qatar	Win	H. M. Mohammed 39'
2007	(Iraq) Akram Salman	Group stage	Iraq 1–1 Bahrain	Draw	H. M. Mohammed 11'
2007	(Iraq) Akram Salman	Group stage	Iraq 0–1 Saudi Arabia	Loss	
2009	(Brazil) Jorvan Vieira	Group stage			
2009	(Brazil) Jorvan Vieira	Group stage	Iraq 1–3 Bahrain	Loss	Y. Mahmoud 81' (pen.)
2009	(Brazil) Jorvan Vieira	Group stage	Iraq 0–4 Oman	Loss	
2009	(Brazil) Jorvan Vieira	Group stage	Iraq 1–1 Kuwait	Draw	Abdul-Zahra 66'
2010	(Germany) Wolfgang Sidka	Group stage			
2010	(Germany) Wolfgang Sidka	Group stage	Iraq 0–0 (United Arab Emirates) UAE	Draw	
2010	(Germany) Wolfgang Sidka	Group stage	Iraq 3–2 Bahrain	Win	Abdul-Zahra 24', 57', H. M. Mohammed 90'
2010	(Germany) Wolfgang Sidka	Group stage	Iraq 0–0 Oman	Draw	
2010	(Germany) Wolfgang Sidka	Semi-finals			
2010	(Germany) Wolfgang Sidka	Semi-finals	Iraq 2–2 (a.e.t.) (4–5 p) Kuwait	Draw	H. M. Mohammed 6', Abdul-Zahra 14'
2013	(Iraq) Hakeem Shaker	Group stage			
2013	(Iraq) Hakeem Shaker	Group stage	Iraq 2–0 Saudi Arabia	Win	S. Shaker 18', Hawsawi 72' (o.g.)
2013	(Iraq) Hakeem Shaker	Group stage	Iraq 1–0 Kuwait	Win	Hammadi Ahmed 29'
2013	(Iraq) Hakeem Shaker	Group stage	Iraq 2–0 Yemen	Win	D. Ismail 16', Hammadi Ahmed 36'
2013	(Iraq) Hakeem Shaker	Semi-finals			
2013	(Iraq) Hakeem Shaker	Semi-finals	Iraq 1–1 (a.e.t.) (4–2 p) Bahrain	Draw	Y. Mahmoud 18'
2013	(Iraq) Hakeem Shaker	Final			
2013	(Iraq) Hakeem Shaker	Final	Iraq 1–2 (a.e.t.) (United Arab Emirates) UAE	Loss	Y. Mahmoud 81'
2014	(Iraq) Hakeem Shaker	Group stage			
2014	(Iraq) Hakeem Shaker	Group stage	Iraq 0–1 Kuwait	Loss	
2014	(Iraq) Hakeem Shaker	Group stage	Iraq 1–1 Oman	Draw	Kasim 14'
2014	(Iraq) Hakeem Shaker	Group stage	Iraq 0–2 (United Arab Emirates) UAE	Loss	
2017–18	(Iraq) Basim Qasim	Group stage			
2017–18	(Iraq) Basim Qasim	Group stage	Iraq 1–1 Bahrain	Draw	Abdul-Raheem 89'
2017–18	(Iraq) Basim Qasim	Group stage	Iraq 2–1 Qatar	Win	Faez 45+1', Husni 65'
2017–18	(Iraq) Basim Qasim	Group stage	Iraq 3–0 Yemen	Win	Husni 54', Faez 64' (pen.), Kamil 80'
2017–18	(Iraq) Basim Qasim	Semi-finals			
2017–18	(Iraq) Basim Qasim	Semi-finals	Iraq 0–0 (a.e.t.) (2–4 p) (United Arab Emirates) UAE	Draw	
2019	(Slovenia) Srečko Katanec	Group stage			
2019	(Slovenia) Srečko Katanec	Group stage	Iraq 2–1 Qatar	Win	Qasim 19', 27'
2019	(Slovenia) Srečko Katanec	Group stage	Iraq 2–0 (United Arab Emirates) UAE	Win	Abbas 6', Abdul-Zahra 37'
2019	(Slovenia) Srečko Katanec	Group stage	Iraq 0–0 Yemen	Draw	
2019	(Slovenia) Srečko Katanec	Semi-finals			
2019	(Slovenia) Srečko Katanec	Semi-finals	Iraq 2–2 (a.e.t.) (3–5 p) Bahrain	Draw	M. Ali 6', Bayesh 18'
2023	(Spain) Jesús Casas	Group stage			
2023	(Spain) Jesús Casas	Group stage	Iraq 0–0 Oman	Draw	
2023	(Spain) Jesús Casas	Group stage	Iraq 2–0 Saudi Arabia	Win	Bayesh 30', Rostam 86'
2023	(Spain) Jesús Casas	Group stage	Iraq 5–0 Yemen	Win	Nadhim 40', Attwan 64', A. Hussein 74' (pen.), 75', H. Ali 88'
2023	(Spain) Jesús Casas	Semi-finals			
2023	(Spain) Jesús Casas	Semi-finals	Iraq 2–1 Qatar	Win	Bayesh 19', A. Hussein 43'
2023	(Spain) Jesús Casas	Final			
2023	(Spain) Jesús Casas	Final	Iraq 3–2 (a.e.t.) Oman	Win	Bayesh 24', Attwan 116' (pen.), Younis 120+2'
2024–25	(Spain) Jesús Casas	Group stage			
2024–25	(Spain) Jesús Casas	Group stage	Iraq 1–0 Yemen	Win	A. Hussein 64'
2024–25	(Spain) Jesús Casas	Group stage	Iraq 0–2 Bahrain	Loss	
2024–25	(Spain) Jesús Casas	Group stage	Iraq 1–3 Saudi Arabia	Loss	M. Ali 64'
2026	(Australia) Graham Arnold	Group stage			
2026	(Australia) Graham Arnold	Group stage	Iraq 1–1 Oman	Draw	Qasim 6'
2026	(Australia) Graham Arnold	Group stage	Iraq 3–2 Kuwait	Win	Iqbal 52', Rasheed 83', Nabeel 90+9'
2026	(Australia) Graham Arnold	Group stage	Iraq 0–2 Saudi Arabia	Loss	
First match: Iraq 4–0 Oman – 27 March 1976, Khalifa Sports City Stadium, Doha, Qatar; Biggest win: Iraq 7–0 Oman – 6 April 1979, Al-Shaab Stadium, Baghdad, Iraq; Biggest defeat: Iraq 0–4 Oman – 7 January 2009, Sultan Qaboos Sports Complex, Muscat, Oman; Best finish: Champions (1979, 1984, 1988, 2023); Worst finish: Group stage (2004, 2007, 2009, 2014, 2024–25, 2026), Sixth place (1986); Overall top scorer: Hussein Saeed (22 goals); Most goals in a single tournament: Hussein Saeed (10 goals, 1979); Draws include knockout matches decided via penalty shoot-out.

==== West Asian Games ====
West Asian Games record
Year	Result	Pld	W	D*	L	GF	GA
1997 to 2002	Did not enter						
2005	Gold medalists	4	3	1	0	13	3
Total	1 Title	4	3	1	0	13	3

West Asian Games history
Year	Manager	Round	Score	Result	Goalscorers for Iraq
2005	(Iraq) Akram Salman	Group stage			
2005	(Iraq) Akram Salman	Group stage	Iraq 4–0 Palestine	Win	Farhan 4', H. M. Mohammed 56', L. Salah 73', A. Salah 86'
2005	(Iraq) Akram Salman	Group stage	Iraq 5–1 Saudi Arabia	Win	Abdul-Amir 8', E. Mohammed 19', Akram 30', Mahmoud 51', 78'
2005	(Iraq) Akram Salman	Semi-finals			
2005	(Iraq) Akram Salman	Semi-finals	Iraq 2–0 Saudi Arabia	Win	L. Salah 33', Farhan 85'
2005	(Iraq) Akram Salman	Final			
2005	(Iraq) Akram Salman	Final	Iraq 2–2 (a.e.t.) (4–3 p) Syria	Draw	Farhan 45', Mahmoud 78'
First match: Iraq 4–0 Palestine – 1 December 2005, Ahmed bin Ali Stadium, Al Rayyan, Qatar; Biggest win: Iraq 4–0 Palestine – 1 December 2005 and Iraq 5–1 Saudi Arabia – 5 December 2005; Biggest defeat: None; Best finish: Gold medalists (2005); Worst finish: Gold medalists (2005); Overall top scorer: Razzaq Farhan and Younis Mahmoud (3 goals); Most goals in a single tournament: 3 goals — Razzaq Farhan (2005), Younis Mahmoud (2005); Draws include knockout matches decided via penalty shoot-out.

==== Arab Games ====
Arab Games record
Year	Result	Pld	W	D*	L	GF	GA	Squad
1953	Did not enter							
1957	Group stage	3	1	1	1	8	8	Squad
1961	Did not enter							
1965	Group stage	4	1	2	1	7	2	Squad
1976	Did not enter							
1985	Gold medalists	4	4	0	0	7	1	Squad
1992 to 1997	Banned due to Gulf War							
1999	Silver medalists	7	4	1	2	17	9	Squad
2007	Did not enter							
2011	Group stage	2	0	1	1	0	3	Squad
2023 to present	See Iraq national under-23 football team							
Total	1 Title	20	10	5	5	39	23	—

Arab Games history
Year	Manager	Round	Score	Result	Goalscorers for Iraq
1957	(Iraq) Ismail Mohammed	Group stage			
1957	(Iraq) Ismail Mohammed	Group stage	Iraq 3–3 Morocco	Draw	Baba 48', Eshaya 50', Salman 63'
1957	(Iraq) Ismail Mohammed	Group stage	Iraq 2–4 Tunisia	Loss	Abbas 52' (pen.), David 80'
1957	(Iraq) Ismail Mohammed	Group stage	Iraq 3–1 Libya	Win	Abdul-Majid 25', Baba 31', Eshaya 71'
1965	(Iraq) Shawqi Aboud	Group stage			
1965	(Iraq) Shawqi Aboud	Group stage	Iraq 6–0 Aden	Win	Baba 9', 48', Hameed 32', 77', Atta 78', 80'
1965	(Iraq) Shawqi Aboud	Group stage	Iraq 0–0 Lebanon	Draw	
1965	(Iraq) Shawqi Aboud	Group stage	Iraq 1–1 Palestine	Draw	Dawood 54'
1965	(Iraq) Shawqi Aboud	Group stage	Iraq 0–1 United Arab Republic	Loss	
1985	(Iraq) Anwar Jassam	Group stage			
1985	(Iraq) Anwar Jassam	Group stage	Iraq 2–0 Libya	Win	Radhi, Abid
1985	(Iraq) Anwar Jassam	Group stage	Iraq 2–0 Syria	Win	S. Mahmoud 60', Allawi 88'
1985	(Iraq) Anwar Jassam	Semi-finals			
1985	(Iraq) Anwar Jassam	Semi-finals	Iraq 2–1 Saudi Arabia	Win	Radhi 60', 78'
1985	(Iraq) Anwar Jassam	Final			
1985	(Iraq) Anwar Jassam	Final	Iraq 1–0 Morocco	Win	Gorgis 8'
1999	(Iraq) Najeh Humoud	First round			
1999	(Iraq) Najeh Humoud	First round	Iraq 2–0 Bahrain	Win	Fawzi 5', H. Mahmoud 35'
1999	(Iraq) Najeh Humoud	First round	Iraq 0–2 Libya	Loss	
1999	(Iraq) Najeh Humoud	Second group stage			
1999	(Iraq) Najeh Humoud	Second group stage	Iraq 3–0 Oman	Win	Fawzi 4', 54' (pen.), Farhan 42'
1999	(Iraq) Najeh Humoud	Second group stage	Iraq 1–2 Jordan	Loss	Mohammed 87'
1999	(Iraq) Najeh Humoud	Second group stage	Iraq 4–0 Lebanon	Win	Mohammed 7', 54', Rahim 59', Abu Al-Hail 88'
1999	(Iraq) Najeh Humoud	Semi-finals			
1999	(Iraq) Najeh Humoud	Semi-finals	Iraq 3–1 Libya	Win	Jafar 3', Fawzi 18', Hamad 32'
1999	(Iraq) Najeh Humoud	Final			
1999	(Iraq) Najeh Humoud	Final	Iraq 4–4 (a.e.t.) (1–3 p) Jordan	Draw	Fawzi 73', 75' (pen.), H. Mahmoud 78', Farhan 87'
2011	(Brazil) Zico	Group stage			
2011	(Brazil) Zico	Group stage	Iraq 0–3 Bahrain	Loss	
2011	(Brazil) Zico	Group stage	Iraq 0–0 Qatar	Draw	
2023–present
2023–present	See Iraq national under-23 football team				
First match: Iraq 3–3 Morocco – 19 October 1957, Beirut, Lebanon; Biggest win: Iraq 6–0 Aden – 4 September 1965, Cairo, United Arab Republic; Biggest defeat: Iraq 0–3 Bahrain – 13 December 2011, Jassim bin Hamad Stadium, Al Rayyan, Qatar; Best finish: Gold medalists (1985); Worst finish: Group stage (1957, 1965, 2011); Overall top scorer: Hussam Fawzi (6 goals); Most goals in a single tournament: Hussam Fawzi (6 goals, 1999); Draws include knockout matches decided via penalty shoot-out.

=== Minor tournaments ===
Minor tournaments
Tournament	Round	GP	W	D*	L	GS	GA
(Libya) 1966 Tripoli Fair Tournament	Runners-up	4	2	0	2	5	3
(Libya) 1967 Tripoli Fair Tournament	Champions	3	2	1	0	7	3
(Iran) 1969 Friendship Cup	Fifth place	4	0	0	4	2	7
(Iraq) 1972 Palestine Cup	Runners-up	5	3	1	1	10	5
(Libya) 1973 Palestine Cup	Fourth place	6	2	3	1	5	3
(Tunisia) 1975 Palestine Cup	Runners-up	4	2	1	1	10	2
(Malaysia) 1977 Merdeka Tournament	Runners-up	7	3	3	1	11	2
(Malaysia) 1978 Merdeka Tournament	Runners-up	8	5	1	2	12	6
(Malaysia) 1981 Merdeka Tournament	Champions	6	4	1	1	16	4
(Singapore) 1984 Merlion Cup	Champions	5	4	1	0	10	3
(South Korea) 1985 President's Cup	Fourth place	8	3	2	3	19	12
(South Korea) 1988 President's Cup	Quarter-finals	4	3	0	1	8	4
(Kuwait) 1989 Peace and Friendship Cup	Champions	5	2	2	1	9	5
1992 Jordan Tournament	Runners-up	5	4	0	1	20	2
(India) 1995 Nehru Cup	Champions	5	3	2	0	8	3
(Malaysia) 1995 Merdeka Tournament	Champions	4	3	1	0	7	3
(India) 1997 Nehru Cup	Champions	6	5	1	0	14	3
(United Arab Emirates) 1999 Friendship Tournament	Champions	3	1	2	0	6	3
(China) 2000 Four Nations Tournament	Runners-up	2	1	0	1	3	4
(Iran) 2003 LG Cup	Runners-up	2	1	0	1	3	5
(Bahrain) 2003 Prime Minister's Cup	Runners-up	3	1	1	1	4	4
(United Arab Emirates) 2009 UAE Cup	Champions	2	2	0	0	2	0
(Jordan) 2011 Fuchs Tournament	Fourth place	2	0	1	1	1	3
(Iraq) 2018 IFC	Third place	2	0	1	1	3	4
(Saudi Arabia) 2018 Superclásico Championship	Fourth place	2	0	1	1	1	5
(Iraq) 2019 IFC	Champions	2	2	0	0	4	2
2022 Jordan Tournament	Third place	2	1	1	0	2	1
(Thailand) 2023 King's Cup	Champions	2	0	2	0	4	4
2023 Jordan Tournament	Third place	2	0	2	0	2	2
(Thailand) 2025 King's Cup	Champions	2	2	0	0	3	1

== Head-to-head record ==
The list below shows the Iraq national football team's all-time international record against opposing nations at a senior level.

Key

Positive balance (more wins than losses)
Neutral balance (as many wins as losses)
Negative balance (more losses than wins)

As of 29 September 2026 after match against Saudi Arabia

- Draws include Penalty shoot-outs
- Countries that are in italics are now defunct

Iraq national football team head-to-head records
Team	Confederation	First	GP	W	D	L	GF	GA	GD
Afghanistan	AFC	1975	2	2	0	0	7	1	+6
Algeria	CAF	1973	8	3	4	1	8	4	+4
Andorra	UEFA	2026	1	1	0	0	1	0	+1
Argentina	CONMEBOL	2018	1	0	0	1	0	4	−4
Australia	AFC	1973	11	2	2	7	8	14	−6
Azerbaijan	UEFA	2009	1	1	0	0	1	0	+1
Bahrain	AFC	1966	43	21	16	6	73	35	+38
Belgium	UEFA	1986	1	0	0	1	1	2	−1
Bolivia	CONMEBOL	2018	2	1	1	0	2	1	+1
Botswana	CAF	2012	1	0	1	0	1	1	0
Brazil	CONMEBOL	2012	1	0	0	1	0	6	−6
Cambodia	AFC	2019	2	2	0	0	8	1	+7
Cameroon	CAF	1984	1	0	0	1	0	1	−1
Canada	CONCACAF	1984	2	1	1	0	7	2	+5
Chile	CONMEBOL	2013	1	0	0	1	0	6	−6
China	AFC	1974	21	11	3	7	27	22	+5
Chinese Taipei	AFC	2004	4	4	0	0	17	3	+14
Colombia	CONMEBOL	2023	1	0	0	1	0	1	−1
Congo	CAF	1992	1	1	0	0	3	0	+3
Costa Rica	CONCACAF	1980	1	1	0	0	3	0	+3
Cyprus	UEFA	2005	1	0	0	1	1	2	−1
Denmark	UEFA	1986	2	1	0	1	2	2	0
DR Congo	CAF	2015	2	2	0	0	3	1	+2
East Germany	UEFA	1967	9	1	6	2	7	15	−8
Ecuador	CONMEBOL	2022	1	0	1	0	0	0	0
Egypt	CAF	1965	13	2	5	6	7	13	−6
Estonia	UEFA	1999	1	0	1	0	1	1	0
Ethiopia	CAF	1992	1	1	0	0	13	0	+13
Finland	UEFA	1979	3	2	1	0	3	0	+3
France	UEFA	2026	1	0	0	1	0	3	−3
Guatemala	CONCACAF	1988	1	1	0	0	3	0	+3
Guinea	CAF	1989	1	0	0	1	0	1	−1
Hong Kong	AFC	2019	3	3	0	0	5	1	+4
India	AFC	1974	7	4	3	0	13	4	+9
Indonesia	AFC	1968	13	10	2	1	31	8	+23
Iran	AFC	1962	31	6	7	18	21	43	−22
Italy	UEFA	1988	1	0	0	1	0	2	−2
Japan	AFC	1978	14	4	3	7	12	20	−8
Jordan	AFC	1964	57	31	14	12	91	54	+37
Kazakhstan	UEFA	1997	4	0	2	2	4	7	−3
Kenya	CAF	2003	2	2	0	0	4	1	+2
Kyrgyzstan	AFC	1999	2	2	0	0	9	1	+8
Kuwait	AFC	1964	44	19	13	12	59	48	+11
Liberia	CAF	2013	1	0	0	1	0	1	−1
Lebanon	AFC	1959	27	16	9	2	51	11	+40
Libya	CAF	1957	15	10	3	2	25	9	+16
Macau	AFC	2001	2	2	0	0	13	0	+13
Malaysia	AFC	1974	8	5	3	0	14	3	+11
Mauritania	CAF	1985	1	1	0	0	2	0	+2
Mexico	CONCACAF	1986	2	0	0	2	0	5	−5
Moldova	UEFA	1992	1	1	0	0	1	0	+1
Morocco	CAF	1957	10	2	5	3	10	9	+1
Myanmar	AFC	1977	4	4	0	0	13	1	+12
North Korea	AFC	1971	11	6	1	4	11	9	+2
Norway	UEFA	2026	1	0	0	1	1	4	−3
Nepal	AFC	1982	4	4	0	0	22	5	+17
New Zealand	OFC	1973	3	2	1	0	6	0	+6
Oman	AFC	1976	32	15	11	6	52	26	+26
Pakistan	AFC	1969	9	7	1	1	40	6	+34
Paraguay	CONMEBOL	1986	1	0	0	1	0	1	−1
Palestine	AFC	1965	19	14	4	1	40	9	+31
Peru	CONMEBOL	2014	1	0	0	1	0	2	−2
Philippines	AFC	2024	2	2	0	0	6	0	+6
Poland	UEFA	1970	5	1	2	2	3	7	−4
Qatar	AFC	1975	41	17	10	14	51	45	+6
Romania	UEFA	1986	2	0	2	0	1	1	0
Russia	UEFA	2023	1	0	0	1	0	2	−2
Saudi Arabia	AFC	1975	45	18	12	15	63	45	+18
Senegal	CAF	2026	1	0	0	1	0	5	−5
Sierra Leone	CAF	2012	1	1	0	0	1	0	+1
Singapore	AFC	1978	6	5	0	1	20	5	+15
South Africa	CAF	2009	1	0	1	0	0	0	0
South Korea	AFC	1972	26	2	12	12	17	34	−17
South Yemen	AFC	1965	6	5	0	1	18	4	+14
Spain	UEFA	2009	2	0	1	1	1	2	−1
Sri Lanka	CAF	1971	1	1	0	0	5	0	+5
Sudan	CAF	1967	3	1	2	0	5	3	0
Syria	AFC	1966	34	18	11	5	47	25	+22
Tajikistan	AFC	1997	3	2	1	0	7	2	+5
Thailand	AFC	1968	22	13	6	3	55	23	+32
Trinidad and Tobago	CONCACAF	2004	1	0	0	1	0	2	−2
Tunisia	CAF	1957	10	2	3	5	10	14	−4
Turkey	UEFA	1959	3	0	1	2	3	10	−7
Turkmenistan	AFC	1999	2	2	0	0	6	2	+4
Uganda	CAF	1977	3	1	2	0	3	2	+1
United Arab Emirates	AFC	1973	38	14	16	8	55	36	+19
Uruguay	CONMEBOL	2003	1	0	0	1	2	5	−3
Uzbekistan	AFC	2000	11	3	3	5	8	10	−2
Venezuela	CONMEBOL	2026	1	0	0	1	0	2	−2
Vietnam	AFC	2007	7	6	1	0	14	6	+8
Yemen	AFC	1993	15	12	3	0	36	7	+29
Yugoslavia	UEFA	1980	2	0	1	1	3	5	−2
Zambia	CAF	1988	2	1	1	0	5	3	+2
Total			770	358	215	197	1,202	739	+463

== Penalty shootout record ==
=== Official matches ===
10 December 1971 1972 AFC Asian Cup qualification	Iraq	1–1 (a.e.t.) (2–4 p)	Kuwait	Kuwait City, Kuwait
	Aziz 15'

7 May 1972 1972 AFC Asian Cup	South Korea	0–0 (a.e.t.) (2–4 p)	Iraq	Bangkok, Thailand
				Stadium: National Stadium; Attendance: 2,000
	Penalties
	Cha Bum-Kun (penalty missed); Hwang Jae-Man (penalty missed); Park Su-Deok (penalty missed)		(penalty scored) Aziz; (penalty scored) Noori; (penalty scored) Kadhim; (penalty scored) Fathi

25 August 1973 1973 Palestine Cup	Algeria	0–0 (a.e.t.) (3–0 p)	Iraq	Tripoli, Libya
				Stadium: Tripoli Stadium
	Penalties
			(penalty missed) Hassan; (penalty missed) Farhan; (penalty missed) Yousif

28 March 1984 7th Arabian Gulf Cup	Iraq	1–1 (a.e.t.) (3–2 p)	Qatar	Muscat, Oman
	Dirjal 102'		Muftah 109'	Stadium: Royal Oman Police Stadium

1 October 1986 1986 Asian Games	Saudi Arabia	1–1 (a.e.t.) (9–8 p)	Iraq	Seoul, South Korea
	Al-Shehrani 39'		Mohammed 51'	Stadium: Olympic Stadium

21 July 1988 1988 Arab Cup	Iraq	1–1 (a.e.t.) (4–3 p)	Syria	Amman, Jordan
	Gorgis 34'		Al-Nasser 33'	Stadium: Amman International Stadium; Attendance: 35,000

12 November 1989 1989 Peace and Friendship Cup	Iraq	1–1 (a.e.t.) (4–3 p)	Uganda	Kuwait City, Kuwait
	Ahmad Radhi		Paul Hasule 29'	Stadium: Al-Sadaqua Walsalam Stadium; Attendance: 35,000

10 April 1997 1997 Nehru Cup	Iraq	1–1 (a.e.t.) (4–2 p)	India	Cochin, India
	Sadiq Saadoun 74'			Stadium: Kaloor International Stadium

31 August 1999 1999 Arab Games	Jordan	4–4 (a.e.t.) (3–1 p)	Iraq	Amman, Jordan
	Abu Zema 30' (pen.); Al-Shagran 51', 70'; Shneishel 67' (o.g.)		Fawzi 73', 75' (pen.); Mahmoud 78'; Farhan 87'	Stadium: Amman International Stadium; Attendance: 30,000; Referee: (Egypt) Jamal Al-Ghandour
	Penalties
	Abu Zema (penalty scored); Al-Shagran (penalty scored); Al-Sheikh (penalty missed); Sufian (penalty scored)		(penalty scored) Shneishel; (penalty missed) Fawzi; (penalty missed) Mezher; (penalty missed) Raheem

31 May 2000 2000 WAFF	Syria	0–0 (a.e.t.) (5–3 p)	Iraq	Amman, Jordan
17:30				Stadium: King Abdullah Stadium

5 September 2002 2002 WAFF	Iraq	0–0 (a.e.t.) (6–5 p)	Iran	Damascus, Syria
				Stadium: Al Abbassiyyine Stadium
	Penalties
	A. Abdul-Jabar (penalty scored); Abu Al-Hail (penalty scored); H. Abdul-Jabar (penalty scored); Emad Mohammed (penalty scored); Ahmad Kadhim (penalty missed); Nashat Akram (penalty scored); Bassim Abbas (penalty scored)		(penalty scored) Nekounam; (penalty scored) Bakhtiarizadeh; (penalty scored) Navidkia; (penalty scored) Nosrati; (penalty missed) Nikbakht; (penalty scored) Bayatinia; (penalty missed) Azizzadeh

10 December 2005 2005 West Asian Games	Iraq	2–2 (a.e.t.) (4–3 p)	Syria	Doha, Qatar
	Farhan 45'; Mahmoud 78'		Al Amenah 19'; Al Hussain 90+1'	Stadium: Suheim Bin Hamad Stadium
	Penalties
	Munir (penalty missed); E. Mohammed (penalty scored); Abdul-Amir (penalty scored); Mahmoud (penalty scored); Sabri (penalty scored)		(penalty missed) Aodi; (penalty scored) Dakka; (penalty scored) Alaya; (penalty scored) Chaabo; (penalty missed) Istanbuli

25 July 2007 2007 AFC Asian Cup	Iraq	0–0 (a.e.t.) (4–3 p)	South Korea	Kuala Lumpur, Malaysia
18:20 UTC+8		Report		Stadium: Bukit Jalil Stadium; Attendance: 12,500; Referee: Saad Kamil Al-Fadhli (Kuwait)
	Penalties
	M. Mohammed (penalty scored); Munir (penalty scored); Abdul-Amir (penalty scored); Mnajed (penalty scored)		(penalty scored) Lee Chun-Soo; (penalty scored) Lee Dong-Gook; (penalty scored) Cho Jae-Jin; (penalty missed) Yeom Ki-Hun; (penalty missed) Kim Jung-Woo

2 December 2010 20th Arabian Gulf Cup	Kuwait	2–2 (a.e.t.) (5–4 p)	Iraq	Aden, Yemen
16:00	Al-Mutawa 1'; Al-Enezi 58'		Hawar 6'; Abdul-Zahra 14'	Stadium: May 22 Stadium; Referee: Hamdy Raaban Shaaban (Egypt)

16 July 2011 2011 Fuchs Tournament	Jordan	1–1 (5–4 p)	Iraq	Amman, Jordan
			Karim 15'	Stadium: Amman International Stadium

15 January 2013 21st Arabian Gulf Cup	Iraq	1–1 (a.e.t.) (4–2 p)	Bahrain	Riffa, Bahrain
18:45	Mahmoud 18'	Report	Baba 61'	Stadium: Bahrain National Stadium; Attendance: 35,000; Referee: Ravshan Irmatov (Uzbekistan)
	Penalties
	Yasin (penalty missed); Ismail (penalty scored); Salem (penalty scored); Mahmoud (penalty scored); Sabri (penalty scored)		(penalty missed) Husain; (penalty scored) Aaish; (penalty scored) Dhiya; (penalty missed) Al Malood

23 January 2015 2015 AFC Asian Cup	Iran	3–3 (a.e.t.) (6–7 p)	Iraq	Canberra, Australia
17:30 AEDT (UTC+11)	Azmoun 24'; Pooladi (yellow card) 22' (yellow-red card) 43'; Pouraliganji 103'; Ghoochannejhad 119'	Report	Yasin 56'; Mahmoud 93'; Ismail 116' (pen.)	Stadium: Canberra Stadium; Attendance: 18,921; Referee: Ben Williams (Australia)
	Penalties
	Hajsafi (penalty missed); Pouraliganji (penalty scored); Nekounam (penalty scored); Hosseini (penalty scored); Ghafouri (penalty scored); Jahanbakhsh (penalty scored); Teymourian (penalty scored); Amiri (penalty missed)		(penalty missed) Abdul-Amir; (penalty scored) Salem; (penalty scored) Ismail; (penalty scored) Adnan; (penalty scored) Mahmoud; (penalty scored) Kasim; (penalty scored) Hussein; (penalty scored) Shaker

2 January 2018 23rd Arabian Gulf Cup	Iraq	0–0 (a.e.t.) (2–4 p)	United Arab Emirates	Kuwait City, Kuwait
20:30 UTC+3		Report		Stadium: Jaber International Stadium; Referee: Aziz Asimov (Uzbekistan)
	Penalties
	Abdul-Zahra (penalty missed); Abdul-Amir (penalty scored); Tariq (penalty missed); Attwan (penalty scored)		(penalty scored) Mabkhout; (penalty scored) Abdulrahman; (penalty scored) Esmaeel; (penalty scored) Barqesh

5 December 2019 24th Arabian Gulf Cup	Iraq	2–2 (a.e.t.) (3–5 p)	Bahrain	Doha, Qatar
17:30 (UTC+3)	M. Ali 6'; Bayesh 18'	Report	Al-Haza'a 14'; Marhoon 45+2'	Stadium: Abdullah bin Khalifa Stadium; Referee: Ryuji Sato (Japan)
	Penalties
	Faez (penalty scored); Ismail (penalty scored); Bayesh (penalty scored); Qasim (penalty missed)		(penalty scored) Al-Hardan; (penalty scored) Al-Shaikh; (penalty scored) Marhoon; (penalty scored) Thiago Augusto; (penalty scored) Madan

23 September 2022 2022 Jordan Tournament	Iraq	1–1 (3–4 p)	Oman	Amman, Jordan
18:00 UTC+3	Hussein 85'	Report	Al-Malki 82'	Stadium: King Abdullah II Stadium; Referee: Mohamad Issa (Lebanon)
	Penalties
	Hussein (penalty missed); Attwan (penalty scored); Ahmed (penalty scored); Rostam (penalty missed); Adnan (penalty scored); Karim (penalty missed)		(penalty missed) Al-Yahyaei; (penalty missed) Al-Malki; (penalty scored) Al-Sabhi; (penalty scored) Saleh; (penalty scored) Al-Musalami; (penalty scored) Al-Yahmadi

7 September 2023 2023 King's Cup	Iraq	2–2 (5–4 p)	India	Chiang Mai, Thailand
13:30 UTC+3	Al-Hamadi 28' (pen.); Hussein 80' (pen.)		Naorem 17'; Hassan 51' (o.g.)	Stadium: 700th Anniversary Stadium
	Penalties
	Doski (penalty scored); Kadhim (penalty scored); Al-Saedi (penalty scored); Al-Hamawi (penalty scored); Resan (penalty scored)		(penalty missed) Fernandes; (penalty scored) Jhingan; (penalty scored) Wangjam; (penalty scored) A. Ali; (penalty scored) R. Ali

10 September 2023 2023 King's Cup	Thailand	2–2 (4–5 p)	Iraq	Chiang Mai, Thailand
16:30 UTC+3	Mickelson 37'; Bordin 82'		Hussein 6'; Attwan 65'	Stadium: 700th Anniversary Stadium
	Penalties
	Kritsada (penalty scored); Thitiphan (penalty scored); Pokklaw (penalty scored); Pathompol (penalty missed); Theerathon (penalty scored)		(penalty scored) Abdulla; (penalty scored) Doski; (penalty scored) Farhan; (penalty scored) Bayesh; (penalty scored) Attwan

13 October 2023 2023 Jordan Tournament	Qatar	0–0 (6–5 p)	Iraq	Amman, Jordan
18:00 UTC+3				Stadium: Amman International Stadium
	Penalties
	Al-Haydos (penalty scored); Fatehi (penalty missed); Alaaeldin (penalty missed); Suhail (penalty scored); Afif (penalty scored); Al-Brake (penalty scored); Gaber (penalty scored); Meshaal (penalty scored)		(penalty scored) Doski; (penalty missed) Al-Hamadi; (penalty missed) Ali; (penalty scored) Adnan; (penalty scored) Allée; (penalty scored) Al-Ammari; (penalty scored) Sulaka; (penalty missed) Resan

17 October 2023 2023 Jordan Tournament	Jordan	2–2 (3–5 p)	Iraq	Amman, Jordan
17:30 UTC+3	Al-Naimat 31', 79'		Hussein 70'; Al-Hamadi 75'	Stadium: Amman International Stadium
	Penalties
	Al-Mardi (penalty scored); Sadeh (penalty scored); Al-Rashdan (penalty scored); Haddad (penalty missed)		(penalty scored) Doski; (penalty scored) Al-Hamadi; (penalty scored) Adnan; (penalty scored) Hussein; (penalty scored) Attwan

=== Unofficial matches ===
26 October 1984 1984 Merlion Cup	Iraq	1–1 (a.e.t.) (9–8 p)	Australia U20	Kallang, Singapore
	Saeed 116'		Farina 109'	Stadium: Singapore National Stadium
	Penalties
	Ali (penalty scored); Saeed (penalty scored); Karim Allawi (penalty scored); Radhi (penalty missed); Hashim (penalty scored); Khalil Allawi (penalty scored); Shihab (penalty scored); Gorgis (penalty scored); Dirjal (penalty scored); Nsaief (penalty scored)		(penalty scored) Bernal; (penalty scored) Farina; (penalty scored) Panagis; (penalty scored) Maier; (penalty missed) Tredinnick; (penalty scored) Gregson; (penalty scored) Vlietstra; (penalty scored) Hooker; (penalty scored) Spink; (penalty missed) Mihailidis

17 June 1985 1985 President's Cup	Iraq	1–1 (4–5 p)	(Brazil) Bangu	Seoul, South Korea
17:00 KST	Goal		(o.g.)	Stadium: Dongdaemun Stadium

11 August 2002 (45-minute match) Triangolare del San Francesco	US Avellino (Italy)	0–0 (4–5 p)	Iraq	Nocera Inferiore, Italy
				Stadium: Stadio San Francesco d'Assisi; Referee: Domenico Celi (Italy)
	Penalties
	Morfù (penalty scored); Vianello (penalty missed); Dié (penalty scored); Pellicori (penalty scored); Silvestri (penalty scored)		(penalty scored) Abdul-Jabar; (penalty scored) Kadhim; (penalty scored) Mahmoud; (penalty scored) Ghulam; (penalty scored) Mezher

== See also ==
- Iraq at the FIFA World Cup
- Iraq at the AFC Asian Cup
