= 1972 AFC Asian Cup squads =

Squads for the 1972 AFC Asian Cup played in Thailand.

== Iran ==
Head coach: Mohammad Ranjbar

No.	Pos.	Player	Date of birth (age)	Club
	GK	Bahram Mavaddat	30 January 1950 (aged 22)	(Football Federation Islamic Republic of Iran) Paykan
	GK	Nasser Hejazi	14 December 1949 (aged 22)	(Football Federation Islamic Republic of Iran) Taj
	DF	Jafar Kashani	21 March 1944 (aged 28)	(Football Federation Islamic Republic of Iran) Persepolis
	DF	Mostafa Arab	13 August 1941 (aged 31)	(Football Federation Islamic Republic of Iran) Oghab
	DF	Ebrahim Ashtiani	4 January 1942 (aged 30)	(Football Federation Islamic Republic of Iran) Persepolis
	DF	Akbar Kargarjam	26 December 1944 (aged 27)	(Football Federation Islamic Republic of Iran) Taj
	DF	Parviz Ghelichkhani	4 December 1945 (aged 26)	(Football Federation Islamic Republic of Iran) Oghab
	DF	Mehdi Monajati	29 June 1947 (aged 25)	(Football Federation Islamic Republic of Iran) Pas
	DF	Javad Ghorab	30 July 1949 (aged 23)	(Football Federation Islamic Republic of Iran) Taj
	DF	Majid Halvaei	7 February 1948 (aged 24)	(Football Federation Islamic Republic of Iran) Pas
	MF	Ali Parvin	20 September 1946 (aged 25)	(Football Federation Islamic Republic of Iran) Persepolis
	MF	Ali Jabbari	20 July 1946 (aged 26)	(Football Federation Islamic Republic of Iran) Taj
	FW	Asghar Sharafi	22 December 1942 (aged 29)	(Football Federation Islamic Republic of Iran) Pas
	FW	Gholam Hossein Mazloumi	13 January 1950 (aged 22)	(Football Federation Islamic Republic of Iran) Taj
	FW	Homayoun Behzadi	20 June 1942 (aged 30)	(Football Federation Islamic Republic of Iran) Persepolis
13	FW	Hossein Kalani	23 January 1945 (aged 27)	(Football Federation Islamic Republic of Iran) Persepolis
	FW	Safar Iranpak	23 December 1946 (aged 25)	(Football Federation Islamic Republic of Iran) Persepolis

== Iraq ==
Head coach: Abdelilah Mohammed Hassan

No.	Pos.	Player	Date of birth (age)	Club
	GK	Sattar Khalaf	1 July 1946 (aged 25)	(Iraq Football Association) Aliyat Al-Shorta
	GK	Jalal Abdul-Rahman	6 May 1946 (aged 26)	(Iraq Football Association) Sikak Al-Hadeed
	DF	Abid Kadhim	1 January 1942 (aged 30)	(Iraq Football Association) Aliyat Al-Shorta
	DF	Douglas Aziz	1 January 1942 (aged 30)	(Iraq Football Association) Aliyat Al-Shorta
	DF	Mejbel Fartous	6 July 1950 (aged 21)	(Iraq Football Association) Al-Quwa Al-Jawiya
	DF	Sahib Khazal	1 January 1943 (aged 29)	(Iraq Football Association) Al-Quwa Al-Jawiya
	DF	Majeed Ali	1 July 1944 (aged 27)	(Iraq Football Association) Aliyat Al-Shorta
	DF	Ziyad Abdul-Hameed	1 July 1952 (aged 19)	(Iraq Football Association) Sikak Al-Hadeed
	MF	Majeed Zuwair		(Iraq Football Association) Al-Mashat
	MF	Salah Ibrahim	1 July 1947 (aged 24)	(Iraq Football Association) Kuliya Al-Askariya
	MF	Shidrak Yousif	1 July 1942 (aged 29)	(Iraq Football Association) Al-Firqa Al-Thalitha
	MF	Riyadh Nouri	1 July 1951 (aged 20)	(Iraq Football Association) Aliyat Al-Shorta
	MF	Hazem Jassam	1 July 1949 (aged 22)	(Iraq Football Association) Sikak Al-Hadeed
	FW	Shamil Kamil	1 July 1947 (aged 24)	(Iraq Football Association) Al-Jameaa
	FW	Ali Kadhim	1 January 1949 (aged 23)	(Iraq Football Association) Sikak Al-Hadeed
	FW	Sabah Hatim	1 July 1950 (aged 21)	(Iraq Football Association) Aliyat Al-Shorta
	FW	Ammo Yousif	1 July 1945 (aged 26)	(Iraq Football Association) Al-Quwa Al-Jawiya
	FW	Ahmed Fathi	24 August 1949 (aged 22)	(Iraq Football Association) Al-Maslaha

== Khmer Republic ==
Head coach: Prak Komsan & Slaman Hasmat

No.	Pos.	Player	Date of birth (age)	Club
	GK	Lim Sak		(Football Federation of Cambodia) Commissariat Général à la Police
	GK	Lors Sarakhan		(Football Federation of Cambodia) Forces Armées Royales Khmères
	DF	Hik Sarim		(Football Federation of Cambodia)
	DF	Tol Kimchi		(Football Federation of Cambodia) Royal Bodyguard FC
	DF	Sok Ronn		(Football Federation of Cambodia)
	DF	Slayman Salim		(Football Federation of Cambodia)
	MF	Tes Sean		(Football Federation of Cambodia) Phnom Penh FC
	MF	Tong Hot		(Football Federation of Cambodia)
	MF	Doeuk Miladord		(Football Federation of Cambodia) Municipalité de Phnom Penh
	MF	Doeur Sokhom		(Football Federation of Cambodia) Municipalité de Phnom Penh
	MF	Sok Sun Hean		(Football Federation of Cambodia) Municipalité de Phnom Penh
	FW	Sea Cheang Eng		(Football Federation of Cambodia) Preah Khan Reach
	FW	Nihim Sokol		(Football Federation of Cambodia)
	FW	Dam Phalla		(Football Federation of Cambodia)
	FW	Tuy Khath		(Football Federation of Cambodia)
	FW	Pen Phath	5 April 1948 (aged 24)	(Football Federation of Cambodia) Association Sportive de la Banque et de l’Assurance

== Kuwait ==
Head coach: (Socialist Federal Republic of Yugoslavia) Ljubiša Broćić

No.	Pos.	Player	Date of birth (age)	Club
	GK	Ahmed Al-Tarabulsi	18 March 1947 (aged 25)	(Kuwait Football Association) Kuwait SC
	GK	Hussein Yousif		(Kuwait Football Association) Al-Salmiya SC
	DF	Ibrahim Duraihem		(Kuwait Football Association) Kuwait SC
	DF	Saleh Abdullah		(Kuwait Football Association) Al-Arabi SC
	DF	Hussein Al-Assousi		(Kuwait Football Association) Al-Arabi SC
	DF	Baqir Abdullateef		(Kuwait Football Association) Al-Arabi SC
	DF	Ali Rifaee		(Kuwait Football Association) Al-Salmiya SC
	DF	Abdullah Al-Asfoor		(Kuwait Football Association) Al-Qadsia SC
	DF	Issa Al-Jassas		(Kuwait Football Association) Kuwait SC
	DF	Abdullah Al-Essa		(Kuwait Football Association) Al-Qadsia SC
	MF	Abdullah Al-Salim		(Kuwait Football Association) Al-Qadsia SC
	MF	Hamad Bouhamad		(Kuwait Football Association) Al-Qadsia SC
	MF	Mohammad Sultan		(Kuwait Football Association) Kuwait SC
	MF	Mohammed Nadar		(Kuwait Football Association) Al-Fahaheel FC
	MF	Abdulhameed Hammad		(Kuwait Football Association) Al-Qadsia SC
	FW	Abdulkareem Nassar		(Kuwait Football Association) Al-Qadsia SC
	FW	Fayez Marzouq		(Kuwait Football Association) Al-Yarmouk
	FW	Jawad Khalaf		(Kuwait Football Association) Al-Yarmouk
	FW	Abbas Karam		(Kuwait Football Association) Al Shabab SC
	FW	Ahmed Al-Najdi		(Kuwait Football Association) Kuwait SC

== South Korea ==
Head coach: Park Byung-seok

No.	Pos.	Player	Date of birth (age)	Club
1	GK	Lee Se-yeon	11 July 1945 (aged 26)	(Korea Football Association) Korea Trust Bank
2	DF	Park Young-tae	12 November 1948 (aged 23)	(Korea Football Association) Korea Tungsten Company
3	DF	Kim Ho	24 November 1944 (aged 27)	(Korea Football Association) Commercial Bank of Korea
4	MF	Lee Cha-man	30 September 1950 (aged 21)	(Korea Football Association) Korea University
5	MF	Lim Tae-joo	21 July 1949 (aged 22)	(Korea Football Association) ROK Army
6	MF	Ko Jae-wook	20 December 1951 (aged 20)	(Korea Football Association) Korea University
7	MF	Chung Ho-seon	10 October 1949 (aged 22)	(Korea Football Association) Sungkyunkwan University
10	FW	Park Su-deok	7 July 1948 (aged 23)	(Korea Football Association) ROK Marine Corps
11	FW	Lee Hoe-taik	11 October 1946 (aged 25)	(Korea Football Association) Hanyang University
12	FW	Kim Jin-kook	14 September 1951 (aged 20)	(Korea Football Association) Industrial Bank of Korea
13	DF	Kim Gyeong-jung	28 December 1944 (aged 27)	(Korea Football Association) Hanil Bank
14	MF	Noh Heung-seop	13 February 1947 (aged 25)	(Korea Football Association) ROK Marine Corps
15	FW	Park Lee-chun	26 July 1947 (aged 24)	(Korea Football Association) Kookmin Bank
16	MF	Hwang Jae-man	1 January 1953 (aged 19)	(Korea Football Association) Korea University
17	DF	Kim Ho-kon	26 March 1951 (aged 21)	(Korea Football Association) Yonsei University
18	FW	Kim In-kwon	16 February 1949 (aged 23)	(Korea Football Association) ROK Army
19	FW	Cha Bum-kun	22 May 1953 (aged 18)	(Korea Football Association) Korea University
20	DF	Han Sang-ki	1946	(Korea Football Association) ROK Army
21	GK	Kwon Yi-woon	26 December 1950 (aged 21)	(Korea Football Association) ROK Army
22	FW	Choi Sang-chul	27 February 1947 (aged 25)	(Korea Football Association) ROK Army

== Thailand ==
Head coach: (Germany) Günther Glomb

No.	Pos.	Player	Date of birth (age)	Club
	GK	Saravuth Parthipakoranchai	10 April 1947 (aged 25)	(Football Association of Thailand) Customs United
	GK	Sunan Masarawatt		(Football Association of Thailand)
	DF	Chumpol Ruangrung		(Football Association of Thailand)
	DF	Narong Sangkasuwan	19 October 1943 (aged 28)	(Football Association of Thailand)
	DF	Chirawat Pimpawatin	30 November 1952 (aged 19)	(Football Association of Thailand)
	DF	Supakij Meelarpkij		(Football Association of Thailand)
	MF	Pullop Maklamtong		(Football Association of Thailand)
	MF	Chatchai Paholpat	30 April 1947 (aged 25)	(Football Association of Thailand) Bangkok Bank
	MF	Ich Narding		(Football Association of Thailand)
	MF	Niwat Srisawat	19 August 1947 (aged 24)	(Football Association of Thailand) Port Authority of Thailand
	FW	Prapon Tantariyanoth		(Football Association of Thailand)
	FW	Pririt Pungdee		(Football Association of Thailand)
	FW	Preecha Kitboon		(Football Association of Thailand)
