= Iraq Central FA Perseverance Cup =

- Organiser(s): Iraq Football Association
- Founded: 1962
- Abolished: 1966
- Region: Iraq
- Teams: 2
- Last champions: Al-Firqa Al-Thalitha (2nd title)
- Most championships: Al-Quwa Al-Jawiya; Al-Firqa Al-Thalitha (2 titles each)

The Iraq Central FA Perseverance Cup, previously called Iraq Central FA Altruism Cup (Arabic: كأس الإيثار, Al-Ithar Cup), was an annual Iraqi football match contested at the end of the season between the champions and the runners-up of the Iraq Central FA Premier League, the top-level division of football in Baghdad and its neighbouring cities between 1948 and 1973. The lower divisions in the region each also had their own Perseverance Cup match.

Only five editions of the tournament were played before it was stopped, and the Iraq Football Association later decided to replace regional tournaments with national tournaments, with the Iraqi Perseverance Cup (now known as Iraqi Super Cup) becoming the nation's super cup tournament.

== Statistics ==
=== Matches ===
Year	Winner	Result	Runner-up
Iraq Central FA Altruism Cup
1962	Al-Quwa Al-Jawiya	4–2	Al-Kuliya Al-Askariya
1963	Al-Firqa Al-Thalitha	1–0	Al-Shorta Select XI
1964	Al-Quwa Al-Jawiya	3–0	Al-Firqa Al-Thalitha
Iraq Central FA Perseverance Cup
1965	Maslahat Naqil Al-Rukab	1–0 (a.e.t.)	Aliyat Al-Shorta
1966	Al-Firqa Al-Thalitha	1–0	Al-Quwa Al-Jawiya

=== Most successful teams ===
Team	Winners	Runners-up
Al-Quwa Al-Jawiya	2	1
Al-Firqa Al-Thalitha	2	1
Maslahat Naqil Al-Rukab	1	0
Al-Kuliya Al-Askariya	0	1
Al-Shorta Select XI	0	1
Aliyat Al-Shorta	0	1

== List of winning managers ==
Year	Nationality	Winning manager	Club
1962	Iraq	Salih Faraj	Al-Quwa Al-Jawiya
1963	Iraq	Abdelilah Mohammed Hassan	Al-Firqa Al-Thalitha
1964	Iraq	Shawqi Aboud	Al-Quwa Al-Jawiya
1965	Iraq	Ismail Mohammed	Maslahat Naqil Al-Rukab
1966	Iraq	Abdelilah Mohammed Hassan	Al-Firqa Al-Thalitha
