= 1966 Iraq Central FA Perseverance Cup =

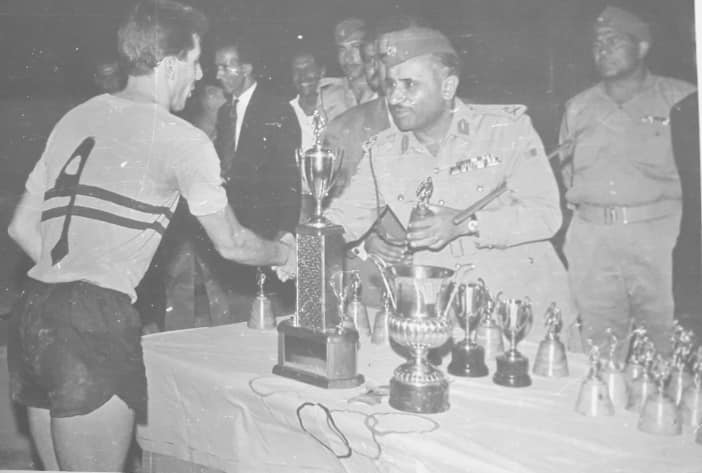
Al-Firqa Al-Thalitha	Al-Quwa Al-Jawiya
1	0
- Date: 9 June 1966
- Venue: Al-Kashafa Stadium, Baghdad
- Referee: Subhi Adeeb

The 1966 Iraq Central FA Perseverance Cup was the 5th and final edition of the Iraq Central FA Perseverance Cup. The match was contested between the winners and runners-up of the 1965–66 edition of the Iraq Central FA Premier League, Al-Firqa Al-Thalitha and Al-Quwa Al-Jawiya respectively. Al-Firqa Al-Thalitha won the game 1–0 with a goal by Gorgis Ismail to win the cup for the second time in their history.

During the match, the ball went outside the field and was lost. A worker was sent to fetch a new ball from the Iraq Football Association's storage which led to a mid-game delay of half an hour.

== Match ==
=== Details ===
9 June 1966

Al-Firqa Al-Thalitha	1–0	Al-Quwa Al-Jawiya
Ismail 33'

Al-Kashafa Stadium, Baghdad
Referee: Subhi Adeeb
Assistant referees: Fadhel Al-Ansari, Ibrahim Tai

Iraq Central FA Perseverance Cup
1966 winner
Al-Firqa Al-Thalitha
2nd title
