= 1963 Iraq Central FA Altruism Cup =

Al-Shorta Select XI	Al-Firqa Al-Thalitha
0	1
- Date: 28 June 1963
- Venue: Al-Kashafa Stadium, Baghdad
- Referee: Salih Faraj

The 1963 Iraq Central FA Altruism Cup was the 2nd edition of the Iraq Central FA Perseverance Cup. The match was contested between the winners and runners-up of the 1962–63 edition of the Iraq Central FA Premier League, Al-Shorta Select XI and Al-Firqa Al-Thalitha respectively. Al-Firqa Al-Thalitha won the game 1–0.

== Match ==
=== Details ===
28 June 1963
17:30 UTC+03:00

Al-Shorta Select XI	0–1	Al-Firqa Al-Thalitha
		Ismail

Al-Kashafa Stadium, Baghdad
Referee: Salih Faraj

Iraq Central FA Perseverance Cup
1963 winner
Al-Firqa Al-Thalitha
1st title
