= Han Sang-ki =

South Korean footballer and manager (born 1946)

Han Sang-ki 한상기
Personal information
- Full name: Han Sang-ki
- Date of birth: 1946 (age 79–80)
- Place of birth: Seoul, Gyeonggi, South Korea
- Position: Left-back

Youth career
- 1965–1969: Konkuk University

Senior career*
Years	Team	Apps	(Gls)
1969–1970	Korea Housing Bank		
1971–1972	→ ROK Army (draft)		
1973–1974	Korea Housing Bank		

International career
1969–1972	South Korea		

Managerial career
- 1978–1984: Kookmin Bank
Medal record
Men's football
Representing South Korea
AFC Asian Cup
Silver medal – second place	1972 Thailand	Team
Korean name
Hangul	한상기
Hanja	韓相基
RR	Han Sanggi
MR	Han Sanggi
- * Club domestic league appearances and goals

Han Sang-ki (Korean: 한상기, born 1946) is a South Korean retired footballer and accountant. He played as a left-back for Korea Housing Bank throughout the 1970s. He also briefly represented his home country of South Korea internationally in the 1972 AFC Asian Cup, reaching runners-up.

== Youth career ==
Han graduated from Joongdong Middle School in 1959. He first began his career by representing Seoul for the 1st National Inter-City and Provincial Youth Soccer Tournament the following his career with Konkuk University following a list of 75 candidates in one of five groups. During the 1968 season, Han Sang-ki contributed to Konkuk University reaching to the finals of the University Football League following an assist from his teammate Park Jun-chan to score the winning goal against Chung-Ang University in the 20th minute on November 29, 1968.

== Club career ==
In the beginning of the 1969 season, Korea Commercial Bank had recently established a football club and chose to sign Han as a part of their inaugural squad later in the year. Despite this announcement, Han later played for Korea Housing Bank as he represented the club for the combined Korea Finance All-Star team that played in a friendly against Brazilian club Olaria on 11 September. This representation continued later into the year as they departed on January 10, 1970 for several friendlies in Singapore, Indonesia, Malaysia, Thailand, Hong Kong and Japan with this marking the first time a Korean club would travel abroad to play. They had experienced considerable success such as the 4–2 victory against Penang on January 20 where Han scored one of the goals himself. In 1971, he was drafted to play for the Republic of Korea Army with his inaugural season having him called up for the 1971 Asian Champion Club Tournament. He was then called up to represent the International Military Sports Council-sanctioned 1971 Far Eastern Soldiers' Tournament which began on 5 June. During the 1971 Korean National Football Championship, alongside his teammate Cho In-so, successfully blocked an offensive from the as this then allowed Choi Woon-hyang to score the golden goal of the match. He then played in a friendly against Thailand on September 30, 1972 where they comfortably won 4–1.

In the beginning of the 1973 season, Han returned to Housing Bank where he contributed to the narrow victory against Korea University during the 1973 Korean National Football Championship. He retired in 1974 as in the following year, he began working for the company full-time.

== International career ==
Han had first caught the attention of the Korea Football Association through being called up for the reserves of South Korea for 1969 alongside 35 other players. He was then called up as a part of a preliminary squad for the upcoming 1970 FIFA World Cup qualifiers but wouldn't make the final cut. He was also part of the preliminary roster for the upcoming 1972 Summer Olympics qualifiers but similarly wouldn't make the final roster. On 19 January 1972, Han represented the South Korea U23 tean in a friendly against the South Korea reserves team as an experiment by the KFA to promote football in South Korea. During the match, Han was granted a penalty kick in the 35th minute which allowed for his teammate Cha Bum-kun to score the only goal for the U23 team in a 4–1 defeat. Despite this however, Han was selected as a part of the final roster for the 1972 AFC Asian Cup where the Taegeuk Warriors went on to achieve runners up with Han only appearing as a substitute player.
