= 1962–63 Iraq Central FA First Division =

Iraq Central FA Premier League
- Season: 1962–63
- Champions: Al-Shorta Select XI (1st title)
- Relegated: Amanat Al-Asima

The 1962–63 Iraq Central FA First Division League was the 15th season of the Iraq Central FA Premier League (the top division of football in Baghdad and its neighbouring cities from 1948 to 1973), and the first since its name was changed to First Division.

Seven teams competed in the tournament, which started on 8 November 1962 and ended in June 1963. It was played in a single round-robin format with each team playing each other once. Al-Shorta Select XI won their first league title, finishing ahead of runners-up Al-Firqa Al-Thalitha and third-placed Al-Sikak Al-Hadeed.

As league champions and runners-up respectively, Al-Shorta Select XI and Al-Firqa Al-Thalitha played out the 1963 Iraq Central FA Altruism Cup, with Al-Firqa Al-Thalitha winning 1–0.

== League table as at 10 April 1963 ==
The following is the most recent league table published by The Iraq Times newspaper as at 10 April 1963, not the final league table. Only one result after this date is known, which is a 1–0 win for Al-Sikak Al-Hadeed against Al-Quwa Al-Jawiya on 11 June 1963. The results of the other five remaining matches are not known.

Al-Shorta Select XI won the league, with Al-Firqa Al-Thalitha finishing as runners-up and Al-Sikak Al-Hadeed finishing in third place.

Pos	Team	Pld	W	D	L	GF	GA	GAv	Pts	Qualification
1	Al-Firqa Al-Thalitha	5	3	2	0	8	2	4.000	8	Runners-up
2	Al-Shorta Select XI	4	3	1	0	5	0	—	7	League Champions
3	Al-Quwa Al-Jawiya	4	2	1	1	14	4	3.500	5	
4	Al-Firqa Al-Rabaa	5	1	1	3	7	15	0.467	3	
5	Al-Kuliya Al-Askariya	5	1	1	3	7	21	0.333	3	
6	Al-Sikak Al-Hadeed	3	1	0	2	6	5	1.200	2	Third place
7	Maslahat Naqil Al-Rukab	4	1	0	3	3	3	1.000	2	

Source: Ali Al-Sabti Archive

Note: Before the start of the tournament, Amanat Al-Asima withdrew after the resignation of prominent club members and were subsequently relegated.

== Known results ==
Home \ Away	FRB	FTH	KUL	QWJ	SHR	SIK	MAS
Al-Firqa Al-Rabaa		1–2		1–4			1–0
Al-Firqa Al-Thalitha			4–0		0–0		
Al-Kuliya Al-Askariya	4–4			1–9			
Al-Quwa Al-Jawiya		1–1			0–1	0–1	
Al-Shorta Select XI			3–0				
Al-Sikak Al-Hadeed	5–0		1–2				0–3
Maslahat Naqil Al-Rukab		0–1			0–1		

Source: Ali Al-Sabti Archive
Legend: Blue = home team win; Yellow = draw; Red = away team win.
