= Marco Vianello =

Italian footballer

Personal information
- Date of birth: 30 August 1983 (age 43)
- Place of birth: Venice, Italy
- Height: 1.79 m (5 ft 10 in)
- Positions: Right winger; forward

Team information
- Current team: Avellino

Youth career
- Milan

Senior career*
Years	Team	Apps	(Gls)
2002–2004	Milan	0	(0)
2002–2004	→ Avellino (loan)	26	(1)
2004	Sora	9	(1)
2004–2006	Sassuolo	56	(11)
2006–2007	Sanremese	23	(1)
2007–2009	Potenza	38	(4)
2009	Cassino	12	(2)
2009–2010	Gela	22	(5)
2010–	Avellino		

International career
2003–2004	Italy U20	11	(1)
- * Club domestic league appearances and goals

Marco Vianello (born 30 August 1983) is an Italian footballer who played for Seconda Divisione club Avellino.

== Biography ==
Born in Venice, Veneto, Vianello started his career with A.C. Milan. In 2002–03 season he was loaned to Avellino and won Serie C1 champion. In July 2003, his loan was extended and Milan also loaned Matteo Contini, Vitali Kutuzov to the Campania side. In January 2004, he left for Sora along with Gianpaolo Parisi.

He then spent all of his career in Italian Lega Pro divisions. In August 2009 he was signed by Gela along with Evangelista Cunzi. In July 2010 he was signed by newly promoted Seconda Divisione club Avellino. He made his first start since left the club 6 1/2 years ago on 15 August 2010, a 0–0 draw with Neapolis Mugnano in 2010–11 Coppa Italia Lega Pro.
