= Evangelista Cunzi =

Italian footballer (born 1984)

Personal information
- Full name: Evangelista Cunzi
- Date of birth: 4 May 1984 (age 42)
- Place of birth: Naples, Italy
- Height: 1.68 m (5 ft 6 in)
- Position: Winger

Team information
- Current team: Lamezia Terme
- Number: 21

Youth career
- –2004: Catanzaro

Senior career*
Years	Team	Apps	(Gls)
2004–2007	Catanzaro	33	(4)
2005–2006	→ Fidelis Andria (loan)	21	(1)
2007–2009	Cassino	66	(8)
2009–2011	Gela	37	(8)
2011–2012	L'Aquila	27	(1)
2012–2014	Ischia	49	(20)
2014–2015	Casertana	29	(2)
2015–2016	Paganese	33	(5)
2016–2018	Catanzaro	40	(5)
2018–2019	Turris Calcio	22	(5)
2019–2020	Latina	20	(11)
2020–2021	Sorrento	19	(4)
2021	Messina	8	(2)
2021–2022	Santa Maria Cilento	24	(7)
2022–	Lamezia Terme	17	(1)
- * Club domestic league appearances and goals as of 20:45, 5 February 2023 (UTC)

Evangelista Cunzi (born 4 May 1984) is an Italian professional footballer who plays as a winger for Serie D club Lamezia Terme.

== Club career ==
On 4 September 2021, he signed with Serie D club Santa Maria Cilento.
