= Salah Ibrahim Ahmed =

Iraqi association football player

Salah Ibrahim
Personal information
- Full name: Salah Ibrahim
- Date of birth: 1 July 1947 (age 79)
- Place of birth: Iraq
- Position: Defender

International career
Years	Team	Apps	(Gls)
1971–1972	Iraq		

Salah Ibrahim (born 1 July 1947) is a former Iraqi football midfielder who played for Iraq in the 1972 AFC Asian Cup.

Salah played for the national team between 1971 and 1972.
