= Majeed Zuwair =

Iraqi association football player

Personal information
- Full name: Majeed Zuwair
- Place of birth: Iraq
- Position: Forward

International career
Years	Team	Apps	(Gls)
1972	Iraq		

Majeed Zuwair is a former Iraqi football defender who played for Iraq in the 1972 AFC Asian Cup. He played for the national team in 1972.
