= Mohammed Abdul-Majid =

Iraqi footballer (born 1938)

Personal information
- Full name: Mohammed Abdul-Majid Reda
- Date of birth: 1 July 1938 (age 88)
- Place of birth: Iraq
- Position: Forward

International career
Years	Team	Apps	(Gls)
1962–1965	Iraq	3	(0)

Mohammed Abdul-Majid Reda (Arabic: مُحَمَّد عَبْد الْمَجِيد رِضَا; born 1 July 1938) is an Iraqi retired footballer who played as a forward. He represented Iraq between 1962 and 1965, earning three caps and appearing at the 1964 Arab Nations Cup.
