= Abid Kadhim =

Iraqi footballer (1942–2005)

Personal information
- Full name: Abid Kadhim
- Date of birth: 1 January 1942
- Place of birth: Iraq
- Date of death: 5 January 2005 (aged 63)
- Place of death: Baghdad, Iraq
- Position: Defender

Senior career*
Years	Team	Apps	(Gls)
- Al Shorta

International career
1965–1974	Iraq		
- * Club domestic league appearances and goals

Abid Kadhim (Arabic: عَبْد كَاظِم; 1 January 1942 – 5 January 2005) was an Iraqi football defender who played for the Iraq national football team in the 1972 AFC Asian Cup. He played for Iraq between 1965 and 1974.

Kadhim was the captain of the Al Shorta football club. He captained the national team for the first time in a World Cup qualifier

Kadhim died on 5 January 2005.
