= Hussein Jaber =

Iraqi footballer

Personal information
- Full name: Hussein Jaber
- Place of birth: Iraq
- Position: Defender

International career
Years	Team	Apps	(Gls)
1964	Iraq		

Hussein Jaber (Arabic: حُسَيْن جَابِر; is a former Iraqi football defender who played for Iraq in the 1964 Arab Nations Cup. He played for Iraq in 1964.
