= Latif Shandal =

Iraqi association football player

Personal information
- Full name: Latif Shandal Issa
- Date of birth: 1 July 1938 (age 88)
- Place of birth: Iraq
- Position: Goalkeeper

International career
Years	Team	Apps	(Gls)
1964–1968	Iraq	7	

Latif Shandal (born 1 July 1938) is a former Iraqi football goalkeeper who played for Iraq between 1964 and 1968. He played in the 1964 Arab Nations Cup.
