= Ziyad Abdul-Hameed =

Iraqi footballer (born 1952)

Personal information
- Full name: Ziyad Abdul-Hameed
- Date of birth: 1 July 1952 (age 74)
- Place of birth: Iraq
- Position: Defender

Senior career*
Years	Team	Apps	(Gls)
- Al-Zawra'a SC

International career
1972–1975	Iraq		
- * Club domestic league appearances and goals

Ziyad Abdul-Hameed (Arabic: زِيَاد عَبْد الْحَمِيد; born 1 July 1952) is a former Iraqi football defender who played for Iraq in the 1972 AFC Asian Cup.

Ziyad played for the national team between 1973 and 1975.
