= Majeed Ali =

Iraqi footballer

Personal information
- Full name: Majeed Ali
- Date of birth: 1 July 1944 (age 82)
- Place of birth: Iraq
- Position: Defender

International career
Years	Team	Apps	(Gls)
1970–1972	Iraq		

Majeed Ali (Arabic: مَجِيد عَلِيّ; born 1 July 1944) is an Iraqi retired football defender who played for Iraq in the 1972 AFC Asian Cup. He played for the national team between 1970 and 1972.
