= Tariq Razouki =

Iraqi footballer

Personal information
- Full name: Tariq Razouki
- Place of birth: Iraq
- Position: Defender

International career
Years	Team	Apps	(Gls)
1966–1967	Iraq		

Tariq Razouki is a former Iraqi football defender who played for Iraq in the 1966 Arab Nations Cup. He played for Iraq between 1966 and 1967.
