= Jabbar Rashak =

Iraqi association football player

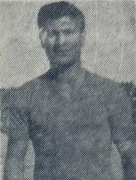

Personal information
- Full name: Jabbar Rashak Abd
- Date of birth: 1 July 1942
- Place of birth: Iraq
- Date of death: 9 October 2015 (aged 73)
- Position: Defender

International career
| Years | Team | Apps | (Gls) |
| 1966 | Iraq | | |

Jabbar Rashak (1 July 1942 – 9 October 2015) was a former Iraqi football defender who played for Iraq in 1966. He played in the 1966 Arab Nations Cup.

On 9 October 2015, Rashak died at the age of 73.
