= Hamid Fawzi =

Iraqi association football player

Personal information
- Full name: Hamid Fawzi Abdul-Jabbar
- Date of birth: 1 July 1939 (age 87)
- Place of birth: Iraq
- Position: Goalkeeper

International career
Years	Team	Apps	(Gls)
1965–1966	Iraq	6	(0)

Hamid Fawzi (born 1 July 1939) is a former Iraqi football goalkeeper who played for Iraq between 1965 and 1966. He was called up for the 1966 Arab Nations Cup.
