= Saleh El Wahsh =

Egyptian footballer and manager (1929–2008)

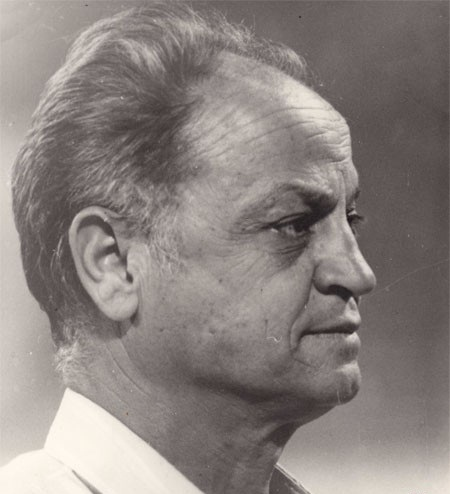
Profile image of Mohamed Abdou Saleh

Mohamed Abdou Saleh El-Wahsh (Arabic: محمد عبده صالح الوحش; 9 May 1929 – 21 May 2008) was an Egyptian football manager and player who played for Al Ahly SC. He coached Al-Ahly as well as in other Arab countries.

== Career ==
He was born in Sayeda Zaynab district in Cairo, Egypt on 9 May 1929.

He became a professional footballer in Al-Ahly then he coached the team in 1959.

In 1963 he traveled to Kuwait to work as an educational supervisor for five years. He also coached the Kuwait national team, before returning to coach Al Ahly.

He was appointed the director of the technical department at the CAF in 1982 and was one of the eight experts on the FIFA technical committee.

In 1988 he became the president of Al Ahly for four years until 1992. In 2000, he was elected chairman of the Egyptian Football Association.

He coached Al Ahly in Benghazi, Libya between 1969 and 1972.

== Death ==
He died on 21 May 2008 aged 79.
