= Mohammed Thamer =

Iraqi association football player

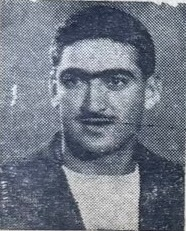

Personal information
- Full name: Mohammed Thamer Mohammed
- Date of birth: 1 July 1938 (age 88)
- Place of birth: Iraq
- Position: Goalkeeper

Senior career*
Years	Team	Apps	(Gls)
1956–1968	AL Maslaha		

International career
1957–1966	Iraq		
- * Club domestic league appearances and goals

Mohammed Thamer (born 1 July 1938) is a former Iraqi football goalkeeper who played for Iraq between 1957 and 1966. He was called up for the 1964 Arab Nations Cup and 1966 Arab Nations Cup.
