= Abdelilah Mohammed Hassan =

Iraqi football manager (1934–2022)

Abdellilah Mohammed Hassan
Personal information
- Full name: Abdellilah Mohammed Hassan
- Date of birth: 1934
- Place of birth: Mosul, Iraq
- Date of death: 30 March 2022 (aged 87–88)
- Position: Forward

Managerial career
- Years: Team
- 1960–1971: Al-Farqa Al-Thalatha
- 1968: Iraq
- 1969: Palestine
- 1971–1974: Al-Quwa Al-Jawiya
- 1972: Iraq
- 1999: Al-Talaba

Abdellilah Mohammed Hassan (Arabic: عَبْد الْإِلَه مُحَمَّد حَسَن; 1934 – 30 March 2022) was an Iraq football coach, who managed the Iraq national team on two occasions in 1968 and 1972. He died at the age of 90 on 30 March 2022 from a terminal illness

== Career ==
Born in the northern city of Mosul in 1934, Abdellilah enrolled at the Sports Training College in Baghdad in 1955 and later traveled to England, where he earned a widely recognised coaching certificate at Lilleshall with the likes of Adil Basher, Shawqi Aboud and Maan Al-Badry. In England, he also spent time looking at coaching methods, techniques and tactics at English clubs Sheffield United and Tottenham Hotspur while in 1974, he traveled to Germany where he spent time with European giants Bayern Munich.

During his career, he coached Mosul, Al-Farqa Al-Thalatha and also the Iraq national team, Olympic and army teams. In 1969, he coached the Palestinian national team and in season 1974–75, he coached Al-Tayaran now known as Al-Quwa Al-Jawiya to the first official Iraqi League. He wrote his first book, New Football in 1968 and second book in 1972 called Football Tactics.

He took over the Iraqi national team for the 1968 Olympic qualifiers in Bangkok, Thailand, where Iraq lost out to the hosts and also coached the team during their two-match tour of the Soviet Union in August, where Iraq lost 4–0 to Traktor Volgograd and beat a Georgia XI 2–0 in their second game in Tbilisi. He had a second spell as coach at the 1972 Asian Cup.
