= Hussein Hashim =

Iraqi footballer

Personal information
- Full name: Hussein Hashim Jabor
- Date of birth: 1 July 1933 (age 93)
- Place of birth: Basra, Iraq
- Position: Midfielder

International career
Years	Team	Apps	(Gls)
1959	Iraq U23		
1962–1966	Iraq		

Hussein Hashim (born 1 July 1933) is a former Iraqi football midfielder who played for Iraq at the 1964 Arab Nations Cup and 1966 Arab Nations Cup.

Hashim played for Iraq between 1962 and 1966.
