= Basil Mahdi =

Iraqi footballer (1943–2020)

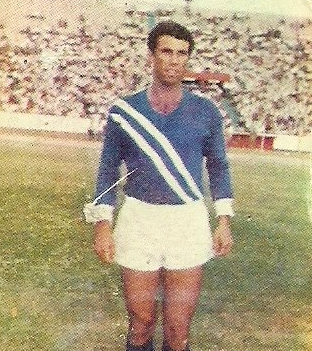

Personal information
- Full name: Basil Mahdi Hammadi
- Date of birth: 1 January 1943
- Place of birth: Iraq
- Date of death: 31 March 2020 (aged 77)
- Position: Forward

International career
Years	Team	Apps	(Gls)
1965–1969	Iraq	6	(0)

Managerial career
- 1978–1979: Al-Shorta

Basil Mahdi (1 January 1943 – 31 March 2020) was a former Iraqi football midfielder who played for Iraq between 1965 and 1969. He played in the 1964 Arab Nations Cup and 1966 Arab Nations Cup.

On 31 March 2020, Mahdi died at the age of 77.
