= Shamil Flayeh =

Iraqi association football player

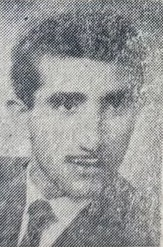

Personal information
- Full name: Shamil Flayeh Hassan
- Date of birth: 1 July 1940
- Place of birth: Iraq
- Date of death: 30 November 2017 (aged 77)
- Place of death: Baghdad, Iraq
- Position: Midfielder

International career
Years	Team	Apps	(Gls)
1962–1966	Iraq	12	

Shamil Flayeh (1 July 1940 – 30 November 2017) is a former Iraqi football midfielder who played for Iraq between 1962 and 1966. He played in the 1964 Arab Nations Cup and 1966 Arab Nations Cup.

On 30 November 2017, Flayeh died after a heart attack.
