= Hassan Balah =

Iraqi association football player

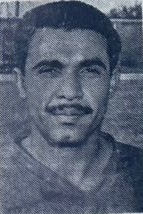

Personal information
- Full name: Hassan Ali Ahmed Balah
- Date of birth: 1 July 1942
- Place of birth: Iraq
- Date of death: 16 March 2017 (aged 74)
- Place of death: Baghdad, Iraq
- Position: Defender

International career
Years	Team	Apps	(Gls)
1963–1969	Iraq	13	(1)

Hassan Balah (1 July 1942 – 16 March 2017) was an Iraqi football defender who played for Iraq between 1963 and 1969. He played at the 1966 Arab Nations Cup.

On 16 March 2017, Balah died in Baghdad at the age of 74.

== Career statistics ==
=== International goals ===
Scores and results list Iraq's goal tally first.

No	Date	Venue	Opponent	Score	Result	Competition
1.	8 April 1966	Al-Kashafa Stadium, Baghdad	Libya	2–1	2–1	1966 Arab Nations Cup
