= Adil Basher =

Iraqi footballer and coach

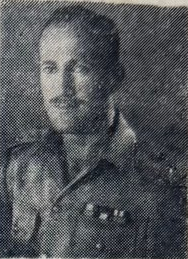

Personal information
- Full name: Adil Basher
- Date of birth: 1 January 1926
- Place of birth: Mosul, Iraq
- Date of death: 9 October 1978 (aged 52)
- Place of death: Baghdad, Iraq

Managerial career
- Years: Team
- 1962–1964: Iraq
- 1966: Iraq
- 1971–1972: Iraq

Adil Basher (Arabic: عَادِل بَشِير الْحَاتِم; 1 January 1926 – 9 October 1978) was an Iraqi football player and coach that led Iraq to the 1964 and 1966 Arab Cup.

== Career ==
Born in Mosul in 1927, Adil Basher completed his primary and secondary education in the northern Iraqi city before moving to Baghdad to enroll at the Military College (Kuliya Al-Askariya), where he played for their football team as a defender. He graduated in 1951 and was one of the players that made a quest appearance for Al-Haras Al-Malaki against Pakistan in 1950. He continued his career after leaving Kuliya Al-Askariya in 1954 in a player-coach role at army teams Al-Firqa Al-Thaniya and Al-Firqa Al-Thalitha.

Adil traveled to England in 1954 where he earned a coaching badge at a training course in Lilleshall, and returned to Baghdad in time to represent Iraq at the 1955 Asian Military Games in Tehran.

He later turned to coaching in the late 1950s, which where he found more success than as a player, and was named coach of the military team in 1960 and eventually national coach in 1964.
