= Sahib Khazal =

Iraqi footballer (1943–2025)

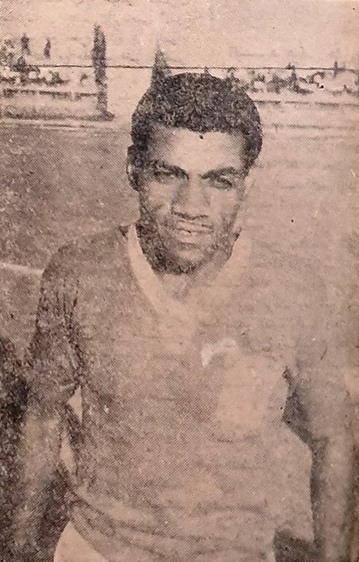
- Khazal in 1968

Personal information
- Date of birth: 1 January 1943
- Place of birth: Iraq
- Date of death: 9 May 2025 (aged 82)
- Place of death: Baghdad, Iraq
- Position: Defender

Senior career*
Years	Team	Apps	(Gls)
1961-1976	Al-Quwa Al-Jawiya		

International career
1963–1975	Iraq		

Managerial career
- 1977: Al-Quwa Al-Jawiya
- * Club domestic league appearances and goals

Sahib Khazal (1 January 1943 – 9 May 2025) was an Iraqi footballer who played as a defender for Iraq in the 1972 AFC Asian Cup. He played for Iraq between 1963 and 1975.

Khazal was part of the team that played their first World Cup qualifiers in 1974. He died in Baghdad on 9 May 2025, at the age of 82.
