= Salman Dawood =

Iraqi association football player

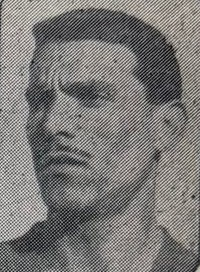

Personal information
- Full name: Salman Dawood
- Place of birth: Iraq
- Position: Forward

International career
Years	Team	Apps	(Gls)
1964–1967	Iraq	7	(1)

Salman Dawood is a former Iraqi football midfielder who played for Iraq between 1964 and 1967. He played 7 matches and scored 1 goal.

== Career statistics ==
=== International goals ===
Scores and results list Iraq's goal tally first.

No	Date	Venue	Opponent	Score	Result	Competition
1.	5 April 1966	Al-Kashafa Stadium, Baghdad	Bahrain	10–1	10–1	1966 Arab Nations Cup
