= Gorgis Ismail =

Iraqi footballer (1943–2025)

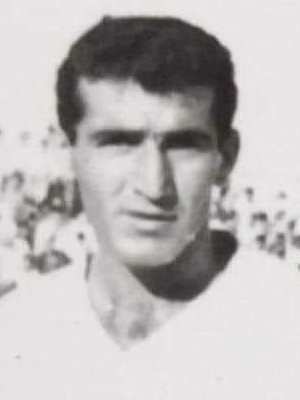
- Ismail in the 1960s

Personal information
- Date of birth: 1943
- Place of birth: Iraq
- Date of death: 17 May 2025 (aged 82)
- Position: Forward

International career
Years	Team	Apps	(Gls)
1962–1969	Iraq	9	(3)

Gorgis Ismail (Arabic: كوركيس إسماعيل; 1943 – 17 May 2025) was an Iraqi football forward who played for Iraq between 1962 and 1969. He played nine matches and scored three goals, two of which were in the 1966 Arab Cup final. He died on 17 May 2025, at the age of 82.

== Career statistics ==
=== International goals ===
Scores and results list Iraq's goal tally first.

No	Date	Venue	Opponent	Score	Result	Competition
1.	5 April 1966	Al-Kashafa Stadium, Baghdad	Bahrain	7–1	10–1	1966 Arab Nations Cup
2.	10 April 1966	Al-Kashafa Stadium, Baghdad	Syria	1–1	2–1	1966 Arab Nations Cup
3.	10 April 1966	Al-Kashafa Stadium, Baghdad	Syria	2–1	2–1	1966 Arab Nations Cup
