= 1966–67 Iraq Central FA Premier League =

Iraq Central FA Premier League
- Season: 1966–67
- Champions: N/A (season cancelled)

The 1966–67 Iraq Central FA Premier League was the 19th season of the Iraq Central FA Premier League (the top division of football in Baghdad and its neighbouring cities from 1948 to 1973). After the outbreak of the Six-Day War on 5 June 1967, the league was postponed for over a month, with one match remaining from the first half of the season and the second half of the season having not yet started.

In July, the Iraq Central Football Association (IFA) decided to cancel all scheduled matches from the second half of the season, and planned to complete the first half of the season by holding its last game between Aliyat Al-Shorta and Al-Firqa Al-Thalitha on 21 August at Al-Shaab Stadium. However, it is unclear if this match ended up taking place, and the league season was reportedly considered as cancelled by the IFA.

Shidrak Yousif was named as best player while Al-Quwa Al-Jawiya's Hisham Atta and Maslahat Naqil Al-Rukab's Adel Ibrahim were joint-top scorers at the time of cancellation with five goals each.

== League table at abandonment ==
Pos	Team	Pld	W	D	L	GF	GA	GAv	Pts
1	Aliyat Al-Shorta	5	3	2	0	16	4	4.000	8
2	Al-Quwa Al-Jawiya	6	3	2	1	9	5	1.800	8
3	Maslahat Naqil Al-Rukab	6	3	1	2	11	6	1.833	7
4	Al-Firqa Al-Thalitha	5	3	1	1	6	5	1.200	7
5	Al-Sikak Al-Hadeed	6	0	4	2	5	9	0.556	4
6	Al-Kuliya Al-Askariya	6	1	2	3	4	10	0.400	4
7	Al-Firqa Al-Khamisa	6	0	2	4	3	15	0.200	2

Source: Baghdad News

== Results ==
Home \ Away	FKH	FTH	ASH	KUL	QWJ	SIK	MAS
Al-Firqa Al-Khamisa		1–2		0–0		1–1	
Al-Firqa Al-Thalitha			– (Note: The Al-Firqa Al-Thalitha–Aliyat Al-Shorta match was scheduled to be played on 21 August 1967 to complete the first half of the season, however it is unclear if this match ended up taking place.)		2–1		2–1
Aliyat Al-Shorta	6–0			5–1		1–1	
Al-Kuliya Al-Askariya		2–0			0–2		0–2
Al-Quwa Al-Jawiya	2–0		1–1			3–2	
Al-Sikak Al-Hadeed		0–0		1–1			0–3
Maslahat Naqil Al-Rukab	4–1		1–3		0–0		

Source: Baghdad News
Legend: Blue = home team win; Yellow = draw; Red = away team win.
