= 1964–65 Iraq Central FA First Division =

Iraq Central FA Premier League
- Season: 1964–65
- Champions: Maslahat Naqil Al-Rukab (3rd title)
- Relegated: Al-Sikak Al-Hadeed; Madaris Al-Shorta
- Top goalscorer: Shaker Ismail (7 goals)

The 1964–65 Iraq Central FA First Division League was the 17th season of the Iraq Central FA Premier League (the top division of football in Baghdad and its neighbouring cities from 1948 to 1973). Maslahat Naqil Al-Rukab won the league title for the third time. Prior to the season, Al-Firqa Al-Khamisa won promotion by beating Shortat Al-Najda 2–0 to claim the second division title.

Aliyat Al-Shorta player Shaker Ismail was the league's top scorer with seven goals. As champions and runners-up, Maslahat Naqil Al-Rukab and Aliyat Al-Shorta competed for the 1965 Iraq Central FA Perseverance Cup on 4 June at Al-Kashafa Stadium and Maslahat Naqil Al-Rukab won 1–0 after extra time with a goal by Qais Hameed to win the cup.

== League table ==
Pos	Team	Pld	W	D	L	GF	GA	GAv	Pts	Qualification or relegation
1	Maslahat Naqil Al-Rukab	7	5	1	1	14	8	1.750	11	League Champions
2	Aliyat Al-Shorta	7	5	0	2	16	3	5.333	10	
3	Al-Kuliya Al-Askariya	7	4	1	2	12	7	1.714	9	
4	Al-Firqa Al-Thalitha	7	3	3	1	9	6	1.500	9	
5	Al-Quwa Al-Jawiya	7	3	2	2	10	8	1.250	8	
6	Al-Firqa Al-Khamisa	7	3	1	3	11	11	1.000	7	
7	Al-Sikak Al-Hadeed	7	0	1	6	4	18	0.222	1	Relegated to Iraq Central FA Second Division
8	Madaris Al-Shorta	7	0	1	6	4	19	0.211	1	Relegated to Iraq Central FA Second Division

Source: Ali Al-Sabti Archive

== Results ==
Home \ Away	FKH	FTH	ASH	KUL	QWJ	SIK	MSH	MAS
Al-Firqa Al-Khamisa		1–1	2–1		1–2			1–2
Al-Firqa Al-Thalitha				2–1		1–0	3–0	
Aliyat Al-Shorta		2–0			2–0		4–0	
Al-Kuliya Al-Askariya	3–0		0–3		1–1			2–1
Al-Quwa Al-Jawiya		1–1				1–0	4–1	
Al-Sikak Al-Hadeed	2–5		0–4	0–4				1–2
Madaris Al-Shorta	0–1			0–1		1–1		2–5
Maslahat Naqil Al-Rukab		1–1	1–0		2–1			

Source: Ali Al-Sabti Archive
Legend: Blue = home team win; Yellow = draw; Red = away team win.

== Top goalscorers ==
Pos	Scorer	Goals	Team
1	Shaker Ismail	7	Aliyat Al-Shorta
2	Qais Hameed	6	Maslahat Naqil Al-Rukab
