= 1967–68 Iraq Central FA Premier League =

Iraq Central FA Premier League
- Season: 1967–68
- Champions: Aliyat Al-Shorta (1st title)
- Top goalscorer: Adel Ibrahim (5 goals)

The 1967–68 Iraq Central FA Premier League was the 20th season of the Iraq Central FA Premier League (the top division of football in Baghdad and its neighbouring cities from 1948 to 1973). Eight teams competed in the tournament, which was played in a single round-robin format rather than a double round-robin format, so each team only played each other once, and it started on 16 November 1967.

Aliyat Al-Shorta won the league title for the first time. Maslahat Naqil Al-Rukab player Adel Ibrahim was the league's top scorer with five goals.

== League table ==
Pos	Team	Pld	W	D	L	GF	GA	GAv	Pts	Qualification
1	Aliyat Al-Shorta	7	4	3	0	15	5	3.000	11	League Champions
2	Maslahat Naqil Al-Rukab	7	4	2	1	10	5	2.000	10	
3	Al-Quwa Al-Jawiya	7	3	1	3	10	6	1.667	7	
4	Al-Firqa Al-Thalitha	7	2	3	2	9	7	1.286	7	
5	Al-Firqa Al-Khamisa	7	2	3	2	12	11	1.091	7	
6	Al-Quwa Al-Siyara	7	1	4	2	5	9	0.556	6	
7	Al-Kuliya Al-Askariya	7	2	1	4	8	17	0.471	5	
8	Al-Sikak Al-Hadeed	7	1	1	5	5	14	0.357	3	

Source: Ali Al-Sabti Archive

== Results ==
Home \ Away	FKH	FTH	ASH	KUL	QWJ	QWS	SIK	MAS
Al-Firqa Al-Khamisa		2–2			3–1		2–2	1–0
Al-Firqa Al-Thalitha			1–1	4–1		1–1		
Aliyat Al-Shorta	2–1			4–1		2–0		2–2
Al-Kuliya Al-Askariya	2–1				0–5		3–0	0–2
Al-Quwa Al-Jawiya		1–0	0–0			3–0		
Al-Quwa Al-Siyara	2–2			1–1			1–0	0–0
Al-Sikak Al-Hadeed		0–1	0–4		1–0			
Maslahat Naqil Al-Rukab		1–0			2–0		3–2	

Source: Ali Al-Sabti Archive
Legend: Blue = home team win; Yellow = draw; Red = away team win.
