= 1969–70 Iraq Central FA Premier League =

Iraq Central FA Premier League
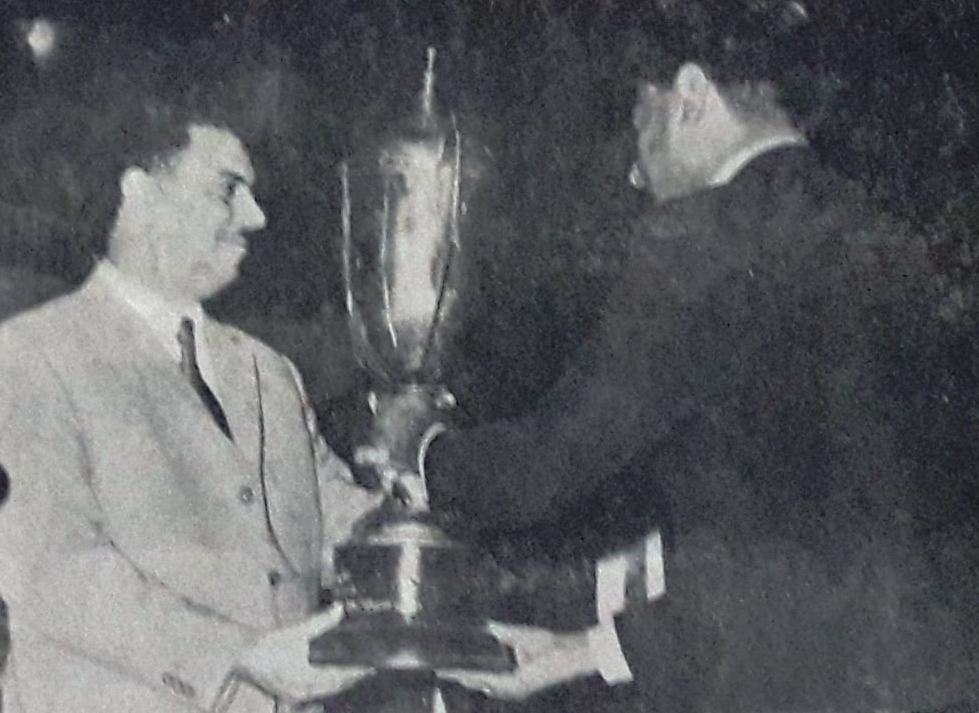
- Season: 1969–70
- Champions: Aliyat Al-Shorta (3rd title)
- Relegated: Al-Bareed wal-Barq; Al-Firqa Al-Khamisa; Al-Omma; Al-Kuliya Al-Askariya
- Asian Champion Club Tournament: Aliyat Al-Shorta
- Top goalscorer: Kadhim Abboud (8 goals)

The 1969–70 Iraq Central FA Premier League was the 22nd season of the Iraq Central FA Premier League (the top division of football in Baghdad and its neighbouring cities from 1948 to 1973). Eleven teams competed in the tournament, which was played in a single round-robin format rather than a double round-robin format, so each team only played each other once. Aliyat Al-Shorta won the league title for the third time in a row. Aliyat Al-Shorta's Douglas Aziz won the best player award for the season.

At an Iraqi Olympic Committee meeting on 4 February 1971, it was decided that champions Aliyat Al-Shorta would be Iraq's representative at the 1971 Asian Champion Club Tournament, thus becoming the first Iraqi team to participate in a major continental club competition. Al-Bareed wal-Barq's Kadhim Abboud was top scorer with eight goals.

== League table ==
Pos	Team	Pld	W	D	L	GF	GA	GAv	Pts	Qualification or relegation
1	Aliyat Al-Shorta (C)	10	6	4	0	21	6	3.500	16	1971 Asian Champion Club Tournament
2	Al-Firqa Al-Thalitha	10	5	4	1	14	10	1.400	14	
3	Al-Sikak Al-Hadeed	10	5	3	2	16	12	1.333	13	
4	Al-Quwa Al-Jawiya	10	5	1	4	10	11	0.909	11	
5	Al-Quwa Al-Siyara	10	4	2	4	16	13	1.231	10	
6	Maslahat Naqil Al-Rukab	10	3	4	3	10	9	1.111	10	
7	Kahrabaa Al-Wusta (Note: Not including the goals of the draw between Al-Bareed wal-Barq and Kahrabaa Al-Wusta.)	10	3	4	3	13	13	1.000	10	
8	Al-Bareed wal-Barq	10	2	5	3	15	13	1.154	9	Relegated to Iraq Central FA First Division
9	Al-Firqa Al-Khamisa (Note: Not including the goals of the draw between Al-Omma and Al-Firqa Al-Khamisa.)	10	2	3	5	12	17	0.706	7	Relegated to Iraq Central FA First Division
10	Al-Omma	10	2	2	6	10	19	0.526	6	Relegated to Iraq Central FA First Division
11	Al-Kuliya Al-Askariya	10	0	4	6	6	20	0.300	4	Relegated to Iraq Central FA First Division

Source: Ali Al-Sabti Archive
(C) Champions

== Results ==
Home \ Away	BAR	FKH	FTH	ASH	KAH	KUL	OMM	QWJ	QWS	SIK	MAS
Al-Bareed wal-Barq		4–1		2–2	– (Note: The match ended in a draw.)		4–1		2–2		
Al-Firqa Al-Khamisa			1–1			2–0		1–2		0–1	2–1
Al-Firqa Al-Thalitha	1–0			0–3	2–0		2–2		1–0		
Aliyat Al-Shorta		2–0			2–0		3–1		2–1		0–0
Kahrabaa Al-Wusta		2–2				3–1		3–1		1–1	1–2
Al-Kuliya Al-Askariya	1–1		0–0	1–6			0–1		0–3		
Al-Omma		–			1–2			1–0		2–3	1–2
Al-Quwa Al-Jawiya	1–0		1–3	0–0		2–1			0–1		
Al-Quwa Al-Siyara		4–3			1–1		3–0			1–2	0–2
Al-Sikak Al-Hadeed	3–1		1–2	1–1		2–2		1–2			
Maslahat Naqil Al-Rukab	1–1		2–2			0–0		0–1		0–1	

Source: Ali Al-Sabti Archive
Legend: Blue = home team win; Yellow = draw; Red = away team win.

== Top goalscorers ==
Pos	Scorer	Goals	Team
1	Kadhim Abboud	8	Al-Bareed wal-Barq
2	Hazem Jassam	3	Al-Sikak Al-Hadeed
2	Aram Aram	3	Kahrabaa Al-Wusta
2	Bashar Rashid	3	Aliyat Al-Shorta
2	Adel Ibrahim	3	Maslahat Naqil Al-Rukab
2	Munaim Hussein	3	Aliyat Al-Shorta
2	Shaker Ismail	3	Aliyat Al-Shorta
