= 1963–64 Iraq Central FA First Division =

Iraq Central FA Premier League
- Season: 1963–64
- Champions: Al-Quwa Al-Jawiya (3rd title)
- Top goalscorer: Amer Jameel (7 goals)

The 1963–64 Iraq Central FA First Division League was the 16th season of the Iraq Central FA Premier League (the top division of football in Baghdad and its neighbouring cities from 1948 to 1973). Prior to the season, Aliyat Al-Shorta won promotion by beating Al-Omma 3–1 after extra time on 29 June 1963.

The tournament started on 31 October 1963, and the winners of the league were Al-Quwa Al-Jawiya who earned their third title. Al-Quwa Al-Jawiya's Amer Jameel and Ammo Baba won the top scorer and best player awards respectively. Al-Quwa Al-Jawiya also beat Al-Firqa Al-Thalitha 3–0 in the Iraq Central FA Altruism Cup on 25 May 1964.

== Name changes ==
- Al-Shorta Select XI replaced by Madaris Al-Shorta.

== League table ==
Pos	Team	Pld	W	D	L	GF	GA	GAv	Pts	Qualification
1	Al-Quwa Al-Jawiya	7	5	1	1	20	6	3.333	11	League Champions
2	Al-Firqa Al-Thalitha	7	4	2	1	17	7	2.429	10	
3	Maslahat Naqil Al-Rukab	7	3	3	1	17	7	2.429	9	
4	Al-Sikak Al-Hadeed	7	2	4	1	12	9	1.333	8	
5	Madaris Al-Shorta	7	2	3	2	8	9	0.889	7	
6	Al-Firqa Al-Rabaa	7	3	0	4	12	20	0.600	6	Relocated to Mosul
7	Aliyat Al-Shorta	7	2	1	4	12	16	0.750	5	
8	Al-Kuliya Al-Askariya	7	0	0	7	7	31	0.226	0	

Source: Ali Al-Sabti Archive

== Results ==
Home \ Away	FRB	FTH	ASH	KUL	QWJ	SIK	MSH	MAS
Al-Firqa Al-Rabaa				3–2		4–1	2–1	
Al-Firqa Al-Thalitha	5–0		3–1		2–3			0–0
Aliyat Al-Shorta	2–1				1–4		2–3	
Al-Kuliya Al-Askariya		2–3	1–4		0–8			1–5
Al-Quwa Al-Jawiya	3–1					0–1	0–0	
Al-Sikak Al-Hadeed		1–1	1–1	6–1				1–1
Madaris Al-Shorta		0–3		2–0		1–1		1–1
Maslahat Naqil Al-Rukab	6–1		3–1		1–2			

Source: Ali Al-Sabti Archive
Legend: Blue = home team win; Yellow = draw; Red = away team win.
