= 1968–69 Iraq Central FA Premier League =

Iraq Central FA Premier League
- Season: 1968–69
- Champions: Aliyat Al-Shorta (2nd title)
- Top goalscorer: Hisham Atta (4 goals)

The 1968–69 Iraq Central FA Premier League was the 21st season of the Iraq Central FA Premier League (the top division of football in Baghdad and its neighbouring cities from 1948 to 1973). Eleven teams competed in the tournament, which was at first played in a round-robin format.

After three rounds of the league had taken place, the Iraq Central Football Association (IFA) decided to cancel the round-robin tournament due to a lack of sufficient funds to complete the rest of the matches, and to restart the tournament under a new format. The competition was restarted as a double-elimination tournament where teams were eliminated after two defeats, and matches that ended in a draw would be decided by a drawing of lots.

Aliyat Al-Shorta beat Al-Quwa Al-Jawiya in the final to win their second consecutive league title. Al-Quwa Al-Jawiya player Hisham Atta was the league's top scorer with four goals.

== Original season ==
The season began in a round-robin format, and three rounds of the original competition were played. Al-Quwa Al-Jawiya led the table with six points after winning all three of their games, with Hisham Atta scoring a hat-trick in their first game. Aliyat Al-Shorta earned three points after one win (4–0 against Al-Omma), one draw and one loss.

Below are the results from the first round of matches:

Round	Team 1	Score	Team 2
1	Al-Quwa Al-Jawiya	5–2	Al-Firqa Al-Khamisa
1	Maslahat Naqil Al-Rukab	1–1	Aliyat Al-Shorta
1	Al-Firqa Al-Thalitha	1–0	Al-Sikak Al-Hadeed
1	Al-Bareed wal-Barq	1–0	Al-Omma
1	Al-Quwa Al-Siyara	0–2	Al-Kuliya Al-Askariya

== Restarted season ==
Due to a lack of sufficient funds to complete the rest of the matches, the IFA cancelled the round-robin tournament and restarted the competition as a double-elimination tournament. Al-Quwa Al-Jawiya moved to the losers bracket after losing to Maslahat Naqil Al-Rukab on a drawing of lots after the game at Al-Kashafa Stadium had ended in a draw.

On the same day and at the same ground, Aliyat Al-Shorta drew 0–0 with Al-Bareed wal-Barq, but the IFA ordered the game to be replayed due to a goal by Al-Bareed wal-Barq player Kadhim Abboud being controversially ruled out. Al-Bareed wal-Barq decided to withdraw from the competition as a result of the incident and Aliyat Al-Shorta advanced. Al-Omma and Al-Firqa Al-Thalitha also withdrew from the competition.

Al-Quwa Al-Jawiya later beat Maslahat Naqil Al-Rukab to reach the final where Aliyat Al-Shorta won 3–1 to claim the title.

=== Top three positions ===
Pos	Team	Qualification
1	Aliyat Al-Shorta	League Champions
2	Al-Quwa Al-Jawiya	
3	Maslahat Naqil Al-Rukab	

=== Matches ===
==== Final ====
1969

Aliyat Al-Shorta	3–1	Al-Quwa Al-Jawiya
Aziz (pen.); Shand; Hussein		Abdullah
