= 1971–72 Iraq Central FA First Division =

Iraq Central FA Premier League
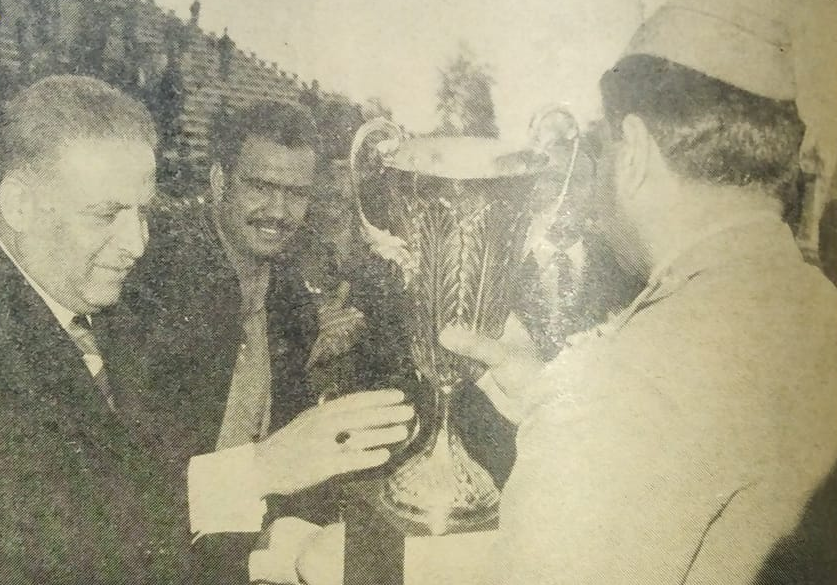
- Season: 1971–72
- Champions: Aliyat Al-Shorta (4th title)
- Relegated: Jami'at Baghdad
- Top goalscorer: Ali Kadhim (6 goals)

The 1971–72 Iraq Central FA First Division League was the 24th season of the Iraq Central FA Premier League (the top division of football in Baghdad and its neighbouring cities from 1948 to 1973), and the first after the return to the old name of First Division. Aliyat Al-Shorta won the league title for the fourth time. Ali Kadhim won both the top scorer and best player awards.

== League table ==
Pos	Team	Pld	W	D	L	GF	GA	GD	Pts	Qualification or relegation
1	Aliyat Al-Shorta	7	4	3	0	11	4	+7	11	League Champions
2	Al-Mushat	7	3	3	1	13	6	+7	9	
3	Kahrabaa Al-Wusta	7	2	5	0	8	4	+4	9	
4	Al-Quwa Al-Jawiya	7	3	3	1	6	4	+2	9	
5	Al-Sikak Al-Hadeed	7	3	1	3	11	12	−1	7	
6	Maslahat Naqil Al-Rukab	7	0	5	2	6	10	−4	5	
7	Al-Firqa Al-Thalitha	7	1	1	5	6	13	−7	3	
8	Jami'at Baghdad	7	1	1	5	8	16	−8	3	Relegated to Iraq Central FA Second Division

Source: Ali Al-Sabti Archive

== Results ==
Home \ Away	FTH	ASH	JAM	KAH	MUS	QWJ	SIK	MAS
Al-Firqa Al-Thalitha		0–1		1–3		0–1		2–2
Aliyat Al-Shorta			3–1		2–2		3–0	
Jami'at Baghdad	4–1			0–2 (Note: The Jami'at Baghdad–Kahrabaa Al-Wusta match originally ended in a 2–0 win for Jami'at Baghdad but was changed to a 2–0 win for Kahrabaa Al-Wusta due to Jami'at Baghdad fielding two ineligible players.)		0–1		1–1
Kahrabaa Al-Wusta		1–1			0–0		1–1	
Al-Mushat	1–2		3–0			1–1		2–1
Al-Quwa Al-Jawiya		0–1		1–1			1–0	
Al-Sikak Al-Hadeed	1–0		5–2		0–4			4–1
Maslahat Naqil Al-Rukab		0–0		0–0		1–1		

Source: Ali Al-Sabti Archive
Legend: Blue = home team win; Yellow = draw; Red = away team win.

== Top goalscorers ==
Pos	Scorer	Goals	Team
1	Ali Kadhim	6	Al-Sikak Al-Hadeed
2	Douglas Aziz	5	Aliyat Al-Shorta
2	Salah Obeid	5	Al-Mushat
2	Qusay Abdul-Sattar	5	Jami'at Baghdad
