= Ammo Baba =

Iraqi footballer (1934–2009)

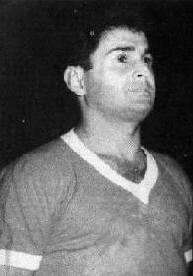

Personal information
- Full name: Emmanuel Baba Dawud
- Date of birth: 27 November 1934
- Place of birth: Baghdad, Iraq
- Date of death: 27 May 2009 (aged 74)
- Place of death: Dohuk, Iraq
- Position: Striker

Senior career*
Years	Team	Apps	(Gls)
1951–1954	RAF Employees' (Assyrian) Club		
1954–1955	Al-Haras Al-Malaki		
1955–1957	Al-Athori		
1957–1959	Al-Quwa Al-Jawiya		
1959–1962	Al-Athori (player-manager)		
1962–1964	Al-Quwa Al-Jawiya		
1964–1965	Maslahat Naqil Al-Rukab		
1965–1967	Al-Kuliya Al-Askariya		
1967–1968	Maslahat Naqil Al-Rukab (player-manager)		
1968–1970	Al-Kuliya Al-Askariya		

International career
1953–1967	Iraq Military	55	(21)
1953–1967	Iraq	17	(12)

Managerial career
- 1970–1974: Al-Kuliya Al-Askariya
- 1974–1975: Al-Jaish
- 1976–1978: Al-Tamim Province XI
- 1978–1980: Iraq
- 1980–1981: Al-Talaba
- 1981–1984: Iraq
- 1986: Al-Rasheed
- 1986–1987: Al-Tijara
- 1987–1988: Iraq
- 1988–1989: Iraq
- 1991–1992: Al-Zawraa
- 1992: Al-Shorta
- 1992–1993: Al-Quwa Al-Jawiya
- 1993: Iraq
- 1993: Qatar SC
- 1993–1994: Al-Zawraa
- 1994–1995: Al-Karkh
- 1995–1996: Ramadi FC
- 1996: Iraq
- 1997: Iraq
- 1997: Al-Shorta
- 1997–1998: Al-Zawraa
- 1998–1999: Al-Talaba
- 1999–2000: Salahaddin FC
- 2000: Iraq U17
- 2000–2001: Al-Quwa Al-Jawiya
- 2001–2002: Al-Shorta
- * Club domestic league appearances and goals

Emmanuel Baba Dawud (27 November 1934 – 27 May 2009), better known as Ammo Baba (Arabic: عمو بابا; Syriac: ܥܡܘ ܒܒܐ), was an Iraqi football player and coach of the Iraq national football team.

He scored the first international goal for Iraq in 1957 against Morocco at the 2nd Pan Arab Games in Beirut and later returned to the team as the coach in 1978.

== Playing career ==
Ammo Baba was born in Baghdad, Iraq, of Assyrian ethnicity. He emerged in the Middle Eastern football scene at the age of 16 at a 1951 Pan Arab School Championship in Cairo playing for the Iraq against the home nation Egypt. He had been discovered by Iraqi schoolboys' coach Ismail Mohammed while playing for the Liwa Al-Dulaim school province team. Mohammed gave him the nickname 'Ammo Baba' and advised him to move to Baghdad to play for one of Iraq's top teams.

Ammo was born in Baghdad on the British controlled military camp RAF Hinaidi but moved with his family to live on the Civil Cantonment on the large RAF base in Habbaniya in 1937, where he first learnt to play the game of football. After playing for his school team, he moved to RAF Employees' (Assyrian) Club in 1951 replacing legendary striker and fellow Assyrian Aram Karam, where he played with other famous Assyrian footballers such as Hormis Goriel, Emmanuel "Ammo Simsim" Samson and Youra Eshaya. In 1954 he signed for Baghdad-based Al-Haras Al-Malaki where he was a huge success, scoring bundles of goals, season after season. The goalscorer wore the legendary number 8, though that is not the number a forward normally wears, it did not stop him from scoring. The prolific marksman was once the captain of a short-lived Arab national team during the mid-Sixties, in a Nasser-inspired experiment in Arab unity which failed due to the fact that, which Ammo Baba puts it 'no one wanted to play against us'. It had been the initiative of Arab radio station Sawt Al-Arab (Voice of the Arabs) in Cairo, and two of the best players from each Arab country were called up to take part in the team, from Iraq Ammo Baba, and Qais Hamed were selected. The team organised in Egypt did not play in any international competitions, managing only to play a few local teams in Cairo and Alexandria. Ammo Baba had been picked alongside Qais Hamed, and the team was able to beat Al-Ismaili, Al-Ittihad Alexandria, draw with Zamalek and lose to Tersana, with Ammo scoring the first goal for the Arab team, and hit another two goals against Al-Ismaili.

After brilliant scoring record for both Iraq and Al-Quwa Al-Jawiya, he was spotted by English 2nd Division side Notts County managed by former Iraqi military coach Frank Hill and was offered a contract to play for them, but when the call from Meadow Lane came, he could not leave the country, due to a sudden coup led by the Iraqi General Abdul-Karim Qasim on 14 July 1958. A year earlier another former coach of his, William Cook offered him a chance to play for Crewe Alexandra, then in the English Third Division and there were also offers from Chelsea and Celtic but Ammo decided to stay in Iraq.

By the age of 20, becoming one of Iraq's most prolific goalscorers at both local and international level, with a near perfect 100% goal-scoring ratio from 1955 to 1960. As a player, he could adapt to any position, and played in defence, midfield and attack in his playing career.

A national championship winning coach at the age of 23 at Al-Athori, done with an Assyrian only club policy, and in 1967, Ammo was coaching two teams in the Iraqi league.

He went on to play and coach Al-Athori (Assyrian Sports Club) to the Iraqi Cup Championship in 1960 beating his former employers Al-Jawiya 3-0 in the final, before returning to Al-Jawiya in 1962 after Al-Athori were relegated from the Iraqi first division. He later played for Maslahat Naqil Al-Rukab and Al-Kuliya Al-Askariya before calling it a day in 1970.

=== International goals ===
Scores and results list Iraq's goal tally first.

No	Date	Venue	Opponent	Score	Result	Competition
1.	19 October 1957	Beirut, Lebanon	Morocco	1–0	3–3	1957 Pan Arab Games
2.	23 October 1957	Beirut, Lebanon	Libya	1–0	3–1	1957 Pan Arab Games
3.	15 November 1959	Beirut, Lebanon	Lebanon	1–0	2–0	1960 Olympics qualifiers
4.	15 November 1959	Beirut, Lebanon	Lebanon	2–0	2–0	1960 Olympics qualifiers
5.	25 November 1959	Baghdad, Iraq	Lebanon	1–0	8–0	1960 Olympics qualifiers
6.	25 November 1959	Baghdad, Iraq	Lebanon	3–0	8–0	1960 Olympics qualifiers
7.	6 December 1959	Adana, Turkey	Turkey	1–0	1–7	1960 Olympics qualifiers
8.	13 December 1959	Baghdad, Iraq	Turkey	1–1	2–3	1960 Olympics qualifiers
9.	13 December 1959	Baghdad, Iraq	Turkey	2–1	2–3	1960 Olympics qualifiers
10.	4 September 1965	Cairo International Stadium, Cairo, Egypt	South Yemen	1–0	6–0	1965 Pan Arab Games
11.	4 September 1965	Cairo International Stadium, Cairo, Egypt	South Yemen	2–0	6–0	1965 Pan Arab Games
12.	10 March 1967	June 11 Stadium, Tripoli, Libya	Sudan	1–0	2–2	Friendly

== Coaching career ==
Due to a serious injury he sustained in 1965 while playing for Iraq at the Pan Arab Games in Cairo, Ammo was nearly forced to retire from the game but returned to play for a further five years. He began his coaching career at Maslahat Naqil Al-Rukab (Passenger Transport) team in Baghdad in 1967 in a player-coach role. A year earlier while returning from injury, the Iraq FA named him coach of the Baghdad XI side for a match against East Germany however they were beaten 4-0 by the Germans and Ammo was relieved of his duties.

In 1978, Baba was appointed as Iraq's football military national team coach, leading the team to its third CISM World Military Championship title a year later beating nations such as Austria, Morocco, and Greece, on the way to the final where they beat Italy, on penalties.

The same year he was appointed as the head coach of Iraq's national team for the first time. He would be appointed and re-appointed on seven occasions, during the 1980s and 1990s (see below for exact years). Iraqis often call the 1980s as the "golden years" of Iraq football, where Baba led the national team to numerous tournaments and many titles.

Throughout his coaching years, Baba was also the Olympic team head coach, where he led the team to two Olympic appearances in Los Angeles 1984, and Seoul 1988.

In addition, Baba led Iraq to three titles in the Gulf Cup (1979, 1984, 1988), the Asian Games of 1982, and the Arab Nations Cup in 1988.

Baba also found success in the Iraqi League, where he led Al Talaba to a title in 1981. After leaving the national scene, Baba was hired by Al Zawraa, and led them to a title in 1994.

=== Managerial statistics ===
Team	Nat	From	To	Record				
Team	Nat	From	To	G	W	D	L	Win %
Iraq	(Iraq)	1978	1979	18	14	2	2	77.78
Iraq	(Iraq)	1981	1984	63	34	9	20	53.97
Iraq	(Iraq)	1987	1988	40	23	6	11	57.50
Iraq	(Iraq)	1988	1989	12	4	4	4	33.33
Iraq	(Iraq)	1993	1993	4	1	0	3	25.00
Iraq	(Iraq)	1996	1996	2	2	0	0	100.00
Iraq	(Iraq)	1996	1996	2	2	0	0	100.00
Iraq	(Iraq)	1997	1997	1	1	0	0	100.00
Total				142	81	21	40	57.04

== Personal life ==
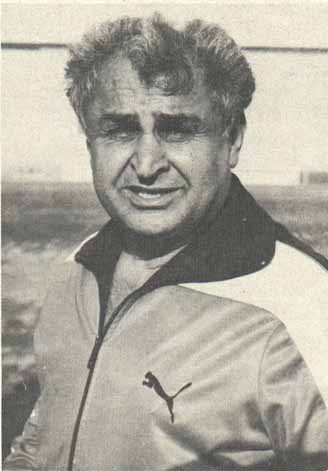
Ammo Baba at a 1979 game.

Ammu Baba was one of the few prominent Iraqis to openly confront Uday Hussein, the president of the Iraqi Football Association, once even refusing to accept a medal from him in front of 50,000 fans after a game in 1992. After the Iraq war, all of his family, including his children, moved to Chicago where there is a sizeable Assyrian community, while he stayed in Baghdad, where he ran a football academy for teenagers. On 20 January 2006, the 71-year-old Baba was attacked in his home, where he was tied, blindfolded, beaten and then robbed.

Ammo Baba died in Dohuk at the age of 74 on Wednesday, 27 May 2009, due to complications from diabetes. He was buried at Baghdad's largest stadium as he requested before his death.

The Al-Rusafa Stadium under construction in the north of Baghdad was renamed to the Ammo Baba Stadium in his honour.

== Honours ==
=== Player ===
Al-Haras Al-Malaki

- Iraq Central FA Premier League: 1954–55, 1955–56
- Army Cup: 1955, 1956

Al-Quwa Al-Jawiya

- Iraq Central FA Premier League: 1957–58, 1961–62, 1963–64
- Iraq Central FA Perseverance Cup: 1962, 1964
- Army Cup: 1959, 1964
- Authority Director Cup: 1964

Iraq Military

- Arab Military Games: 1965

Iraq

- Tripoli Fair Tournament: 1967

=== Player-manager ===
Al-Athori

- Iraq Central FA Premier League: 1959–60

=== Manager ===
Al-Tamim Province XI

- Republic Championship: 1976

Iraq

- Asian Games: 1982
- Arab Cup: 1988
- Arabian Gulf Cup: 1979, 1984, 1988
- Merdeka Tournament: 1981

Iraq Military

- World Military Cup: 1979

Al-Talaba

- Iraqi Premier League: 1980–81

Al-Rasheed

- Arab Club Champions Cup: 1987

Al-Zawraa

- Iraqi Premier League: 1993–94
- Iraq FA Cup: 1993–94
