= Jamil Abbas =

Iraqi footballer (1927–2005)

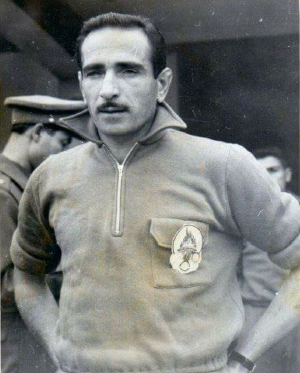

Personal information
- Date of birth: 1 January 1927
- Place of birth: Baghdad, Iraq
- Date of death: 7 July 2005 (aged 78)
- Place of death: Baghdad, Iraq
- Position: Defender

Senior career*
Years	Team	Apps	(Gls)
1945–1949	Nadi Al-Olympia Al-Maliki		
1949–1957	Haris Al-Maliki		
1957–1966	Farqa Al-Thalatha		

International career
1951–1965	Iraq		
- * Club domestic league appearances and goals

Jamil Abbas (Arabic: جَمِيل عَبَّاس; 1 January 1927 – 7 July 2005) was one of the longest serving national captains of Iraq. He was part of the Iraqi national team for over 15 years. The defender was captain of Iraq, as well as the Olympic and Army teams from 1954 to 1966; a record. Abbas was known to millions of Iraqis by the nickname Jamoli (Arabic: جَمُّولِيّ).

Born in 1927 in Baghdad, the left full back turned centre half played for Nadi Al-Olympia Al-Maliki (Royal Olympic Club) in Adhammiya from 1945. He went onto join one of Iraq's top sides of the 40s and 50s, Haris Al-Maliki (Royal Guards). Abbas continued to play for the team until 1957, when he joined the newly formed Farqa Al-Thalatha (Third Armoured Division).

In 1951, at age 23, Abbas was lining up in Iraq's first national team alongside the best players in Iraq against the Turkey B team in Izmir and an Ankara XI, and four years later, he was starring for the Iraqi Army team against Egypt after Iraq was affiliated into CISM.

Abbas captained Iraq at the 2nd Pan Arab Games in Beirut, where they played their first international match against Morocco; Abbas went onto score in Iraq's second game against Tunisia, from the penalty spot however the game ended in 4–2 defeat.

In late 1959, Abbas captained the first Iraqi Olympic team which included the likes of Mohammed Thamir and Ammo Baba to a 3–0 win over Lebanon in Beirut in a 1960 Summer Olympic Games qualifying match. Due to his absence through injury in the following round against Turkey in Adana, the Iraqi Olympic team lost 7–1.

Abbas led Iraq to their first Arab Cup in Kuwait in 1964 and two years later after sitting out the 1966 Arab Cup which Iraq won in Baghdad the famed captain retired. In his last match on April 4, 1966, at the age of 39, the stars of the Arab football world turned out for a game between Third Armoured Division and an Arab national team at the Al-Kashafa Stadium in Baghdad. The match ended in a 0–0 draw.

After he retired, a statue of the Iraqi captain was unveiled at the entrance of the Al-Kashafa stadium, that he had graced for over three decades. He died in 2005.
