= 1953–54 Iraq FA Baghdad First Division =

Iraq Central FA Premier League
- Season: 1953–54
- Champions: Al-Haras Al-Malaki (5th title)

The 1953–54 Iraq FA Baghdad First Division League was the sixth season of the Iraq Central FA Premier League (the top division of football in Baghdad and its neighbouring cities from 1948 to 1973). Al-Haras Al-Malaki won their fifth consecutive league title.

One of the tournament's matches came in January 1954, when the Civil Cantonment (C.C.) select team from Habbaniya defeated Al-Sikak Al-Hadeed 2–1 at Al-Kashafa Stadium with goals from Ammo Baba and Youra Eshaya.

The C.C. team then went on to face Al-Quwa Al-Jawiya Al-Malakiya the following month at the same stadium. Ammo Baba gave C.C. the lead after four minutes before Al-Quwa Al-Jawiya Al-Malakiya scored the next three goals through Rahoomi Jassim (ninth minute), Rashid Jedaya and Taha (20th minute). Jamil Jowahar brought a goal back for C.C. before Ammo Baba scored again in the 75th minute and then made it a hat-trick moments later to win the match 4–3 for C.C.
