= 1948–49 Iraq FA Baghdad First Division =

Iraq Central FA Premier League
- Season: 1948–49
- Champions: Al-Kuliya Al-Askariya Al-Malakiya (1st title)
- Relegated: Al-Malaki; Al-Shorta Select XI; Kuliyat Al-Huqooq

The 1948–49 Iraq FA Baghdad First Division League was the first season of the Iraq Central FA Premier League (the top division of football in Baghdad and its neighbouring cities from 1948 to 1973). The competition started on 5 November 1948, after the fixture list had been drawn up at a meeting between club representatives held at the Al-Malaki club.

The Iraq Central Football Association (IFA) intended to hold the league in a double round-robin format, but this was changed to a single round-robin after several games had to be postponed due to rainy weather. The IFA also set a rule that players who had already played for one club in a league game could not play for another team without prior permission from the League Committee, however Al-Shorta Select XI and Wizarat Al-Maarif were found to have broken this rule.

The title-deciding match between Al-Kuliya Al-Askariya Al-Malakiya and Al-Haras Al-Malaki was played on 16 April 1949 at Al-Kashafa Stadium. Al-Haras Al-Malaki needed to win outright in order to overtake their opponents and win the title, but the game ended 3–3 and therefore Al-Kuliya Al-Askariya Al-Malakiya were crowned inaugural league champions.

== League table as at 12 December 1948 ==
The following is the most recent league table published by The Iraq Times newspaper as at 12 December 1948, not the final league table. Only a few results from after this date are known. (Note: The results known from after 12 December 1948 are: Al-Haras Al-Malaki won against Al-Malaki; Al-Haras Al-Malaki 5–2 Casuals; Al-Kuliya Al-Askariya Al-Malakiya 7–0 Casuals; Al-Kuliya Al-Askariya Al-Malakiya 3–3 Al-Haras Al-Malaki)

Al-Kuliya Al-Askariya Al-Malakiya won the league. Al-Malaki, Al-Shorta Select XI and Kuliyat Al-Huqooq were relegated, while Al-Ahli, Wizarat Al-Maarif and Casuals (as the only British team) remained in the top-flight for the 1949–50 season. Ittihad Muntada Al-Karkh decided not to field a team for the following season.

Pos	Team	Pld	W	D	L	GF	GA	GAv	Pts	Qualification or relegation
1	Al-Kuliya Al-Askariya Al-Malakiya	4	4	0	0	17	0	—	8	League Champions
2	Al-Ahli	4	3	1	0	15	3	5.000	7	
3	Al-Haras Al-Malaki	3	3	0	0	13	0	—	6	
4	Ittihad Muntada Al-Karkh	6	3	0	3	13	13	1.000	6	
5	Al-Malaki	4	2	1	1	6	4	1.500	5	Relegated to Iraq FA Baghdad Second Division
6	Al-Shorta Select XI	5	1	0	4	7	23	0.304	2	Relegated to Iraq FA Baghdad Second Division
7	Wizarat Al-Maarif	2	0	0	2	1	4	0.250	0	
8	Casuals	4	0	0	4	3	16	0.188	0	
9	Kuliyat Al-Huqooq (Note: Kuliyat Al-Huqooq were expelled from the league after failing to show up for two consecutive matches against Casuals and Al-Shorta Select XI respectively.)	2	0	0	2	0	12	0.000	0	Relegated to Iraq FA Baghdad Second Division

Source: The Iraq Times (Note: Al-Quwa Al-Jawiya Al-Malakiya decided not to field a team for the season, after failing to get together a team for the opening weekend of the season due to unforeseen circumstances.)

== Known results ==
Home \ Away	AHL	HAR	KUL	MLK	CAS	ITT	KHQ	SHR	WIZ
Al-Ahli				1–1		3–1		7–0	
Al-Haras Al-Malaki				– (Note: The Al-Haras Al-Malaki–Al-Malaki match was ordered to be replayed after Al-Malaki players left the field in the 79th minute while losing 2–1 in protest at a refereeing decision. Al-Haras Al-Malaki won the replay.)			5–0	5–0	
Al-Kuliya Al-Askariya Al-Malakiya		3–3		1–0	7–0			5–1	
Al-Malaki					3–1				2–1
Casuals	1–4	2–5				1–5		1–4	
Ittihad Muntada Al-Karkh		0–3	0–4						
Kuliyat Al-Huqooq			0–7		– (Note: Kuliyat Al-Huqooq were expelled from the league after failing to show up for two consecutive matches against Casuals and Al-Shorta Select XI respectively.)				
Al-Shorta Select XI						2–5	–		– (Note: The Al-Shorta Select XI–Wizarat Al-Maarif match was rescheduled after Wizarat Al-Maarif failed to show up on the original date.)
Wizarat Al-Maarif						0–2			

Source: The Iraq Times
Legend: Blue = home team win; Yellow = draw; Red = away team win.
