= 1965–66 Iraq Central FA Premier League =

Iraq Central FA Premier League
- Season: 1965–66
- Champions: Al-Firqa Al-Thalitha (1st title)
- Top goalscorer: Nouri Dhiab; Mahmoud Assad (7 goals each)

The 1965–66 Iraq Central FA Premier League was the 18th season of the Iraq Central FA Premier League (the top division of football in Baghdad and its neighbouring cities from 1948 to 1973), and the first under the name of Premier League. It kicked off on 15 October 1965 with its last match being held on 2 June 1966.

Al-Firqa Al-Thalitha became champions for the first time with a two-point lead over Al-Quwa Al-Jawiya and a realistically unassailable superior goal average. On 11 July 1966, the Iraq Central Football Association decided to end the league with two matches left to play following a meeting with clubs two days earlier. This was the first season that featured a double round-robin format where each team was scheduled to play all the other teams in the league twice, once home and once away.

Al-Firqa Al-Thalitha's Shidrak Yousif won the best player award while their duo Nouri Dhiab and Mahmoud Assad shared the top scorer award with seven goals each. Al-Firqa Al-Thalitha also beat Al-Quwa Al-Jawiya 1–0 in the Iraq Central FA Perseverance Cup on 9 June 1966.

== League table ==
Pos	Team	Pld	W	D	L	GF	GA	GAv	Pts	Qualification
1	Al-Firqa Al-Thalitha	9	5	4	0	25	6	4.167	14	League Champions
2	Al-Quwa Al-Jawiya	9	5	2	2	19	13	1.462	12	
3	Maslahat Naqil Al-Rukab	10	3	4	3	14	13	1.077	10	
4	Aliyat Al-Shorta	10	3	2	5	15	21	0.714	8	
5	Al-Kuliya Al-Askariya	8	2	2	4	9	15	0.600	6	
6	Al-Firqa Al-Khamisa (Note: Al-Firqa Al-Khamisa (Fifth Division) were also known by the name Fawj Tadrib Baghdad (Baghdad Training Battalion).)	10	2	2	6	9	23	0.391	6	

Source: Ali Al-Sabti Archive

== Results ==
Home \ Away	FKH	FTH	ASH	KUL	QWJ	MAS
Al-Firqa Al-Khamisa (Note: Al-Firqa Al-Khamisa (Fifth Division) were also known by the name Fawj Tadrib Baghdad (Baghdad Training Battalion).)		1–1	2–1	0–4	1–1	1–2
Al-Firqa Al-Thalitha	6–0		0–0	4–0	2–2	2–2
Aliyat Al-Shorta	2–1	1–4		1–2	3–5	3–2
Al-Kuliya Al-Askariya	0–3		1–2			1–1
Al-Quwa Al-Jawiya	3–0	0–4	3–1	3–0		1–2
Maslahat Naqil Al-Rukab	3–0	0–2	1–1	1–1	0–1 (Note: The Maslahat Naqil Al-Rukab–Al-Quwa Al-Jawiya match was awarded as a 1–0 win to Al-Quwa Al-Jawiya, as Maslahat Naqil Al-Rukab did not turn up for the game.)	

Source: Ali Al-Sabti Archive
Legend: Blue = home team win; Yellow = draw; Red = away team win.
