= Independent Baghdad Tournament =

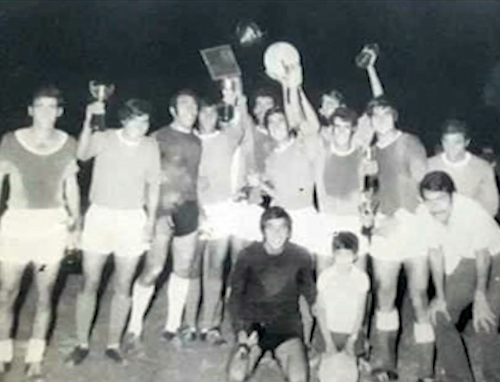
- Dates: 5 March – 14 June 1973

Final positions
- Champions: Al-Sikak Al-Hadeed
- Runner-up: Aliyat Al-Shorta

Tournament statistics
- Matches played: 29
- Goals scored: 56 (1.93 per match)

The Independent Baghdad Tournament (Arabic: دورة بغداد الخاصة) was a tournament organised by the Iraq Football Association in 1973, independently from its main regional league competitions, to allow the region's top-flight teams to continue playing matches after the premature end to the 1972–73 Iraq Central FA First Division. The teams were not able to field players that had been called up for the Iraq national team or the Iraq military team, as those players were preparing for the World Cup qualifiers and the Military World Championship respectively.

The tournament began on 5 March, with the regular season ending on 24 May and the final being played on 14 June, where Al-Sikak Al-Hadeed beat Aliyat Al-Shorta 3–1 to claim the title.

== Regular season ==
=== League table ===
Pos	Team	Pld	W	D	L	GF	GA	GD	Pts	Qualification
1	Al-Sikak Al-Hadeed	7	4	2	1	13	5	+8	10	Qualified to the Final
2	Aliyat Al-Shorta	7	2	4	1	7	5	+2	8	Qualified to the Final
3	Kahrabaa Al-Wusta	7	2	4	1	5	4	+1	8	
4	Al-Quwa Al-Jawiya	7	1	5	1	6	5	+1	7	
5	Shortat Al-Najda	7	2	3	2	6	10	−4	7	
6	Maslahat Naqil Al-Rukab	7	1	4	2	6	7	−1	6	
7	Quwat Salahaddin	7	1	3	3	5	8	−3	5	
8	Al-Mushat	7	0	5	2	4	8	−4	5	

Source: Ali Al-Sabti Archive

=== Results ===
Home \ Away	ASH	KAH	MUS	QWJ	SIK	MAS	QSD	SHN
Aliyat Al-Shorta			1–1		2–0		1–1	
Kahrabaa Al-Wusta	1–0			0–0		1–1		2–0
Al-Mushat		1–1			1–3		0–0	
Al-Quwa Al-Jawiya	0–0		2–0			0–0		1–1
Al-Sikak Al-Hadeed		2–0		1–1			2–0	
Maslahat Naqil Al-Rukab	1–2		1–1		1–1			1–2
Quwat Salahaddin		0–0		3–2		0–1		
Shortat Al-Najda	1–1		0–0		0–4		2–1	

Source: Ali Al-Sabti Archive
Legend: Blue = home team win; Yellow = draw; Red = away team win.

== Final ==
14 June 1973
18:30 UTC+03:00

Al-Sikak Al-Hadeed	3–1	Aliyat Al-Shorta
Yousif 75'; Abdul-Hameed 77'		Hussein 20'

Al-Shaab Stadium, Baghdad
Attendance: 12,000
Referee: Salih Faraj

Al-Sikak Al-Hadeed	Aliyat Al-Shorta

GK	(Iraq) Kadhim Khalaf
DF	(Iraq) Samir Mohammed Ali
DF	(Iraq) Ali Hussein Batoush
DF	(Iraq) Ibrahim Ali
DF	(Iraq) Resan Bonyan
MF	(Iraq) Jabbar Khazal
MF	(Iraq) Fatah Mohammed	Substituted off
FW	(Iraq) Saad Abdul-Hameed
FW	(Iraq) Adel Kateh
FW	(Iraq) Thamer Yousif
FW	(Iraq) Kadhim Luaibi
Substitutes:
MF	(Iraq) Hassani Alwan	Substituted in
Manager:
(Iraq) Georges Elias

GK	(Iraq) Latif Shandal
DF	(Iraq) Saad Hammoud
DF	(Iraq) Gilbert Sami
DF	(Iraq) Majeed Ali
DF	(Iraq) Hadi Al-Janabi
MF	(Iraq) Saad Dawood
MF	(Iraq) Razzaq Hatem
FW	(Iraq) Munaim Hussein
FW	(Iraq) Jabbar Hameed
FW	(Iraq) Tariq Aziz
FW	(Iraq) Mudhafar Nouri
Substitutes:
FW	(Iraq) Shaker Ismail	Substituted in
Manager:
(Iraq) Mohammed Najeeb Kaban

Assistant referees:
Nouri Abbas
Saadi Al-Bakri
