= 1970–71 Iraq Central FA Premier League =

Iraq Central FA Premier League
- Season: 1970–71
- Champions: Maslahat Naqil Al-Rukab (4th title)
- Relegated: Al-Quwa Al-Siyara

The 1970–71 Iraq Central FA Premier League was the 23rd season of the Iraq Central FA Premier League (the top division of football in Baghdad and its neighbouring cities from 1948 to 1973). Eight teams competed in the tournament, which was played in a double round-robin format.

After returning from the 1971 Asian Champion Club Tournament, Aliyat Al-Shorta had two games in hand against Al-Sikak Al-Hadeed and Al-Mushat, and they had to win both games to win the league. Al-Sikak Al-Hadeed managed to go 2–0 up in the first half through two goals from Ali Kadhim. Aliyat Al-Shorta then scored twice in the last ten minutes through Douglas Aziz and Tariq Aziz but the game ended 2–2, giving Maslahat Naqil Al-Rukab their fourth league title.

Aliyat Al-Shorta's 5–0 win over Al-Quwa Al-Siyara during the second half of the season was annulled by the Iraqi Olympic Committee due to suspicions of match fixing, as both teams belonged to the same institution (the Iraqi Police). Al-Quwa Al-Siyara were relegated to the third-tier as punishment, while Aliyat Al-Shorta, who denied any wrongdoing, missed out on two points that would have won them the title.

== League table ==
Pos	Team	Pts
1	Maslahat Naqil Al-Rukab	20
2	Aliyat Al-Shorta	19
3	Al-Quwa Al-Jawiya	16
4	Al-Sikak Al-Hadeed	14
5	Al-Firqa Al-Thalitha	13
6	Kahrabaa Al-Wusta	
7	Al-Mushat	
8	Al-Quwa Al-Siyara	

League Champions
Relegated to Iraq Central FA Second Division

== Known results ==
Home \ Away	FTH	ASH	MUS	QWJ	QWS	SIK	KAH	MAS
Al-Firqa Al-Thalitha		– (Note: The match ended in a win for Aliyat Al-Shorta.)	4–1		1–1	0–0	1–1	
Aliyat Al-Shorta	2–1		2–0	0–1	– (Note: The Aliyat Al-Shorta–Al-Quwa Al-Siyara match ended in a 5–0 win for Aliyat Al-Shorta but the result was later annulled due to suspicions of match fixing, as both teams belonged to the same institution (the Iraqi Police).)	2–1	0–1	1–0
Al-Mushat		1–4						
Al-Quwa Al-Jawiya		2–2			2–0	1–1		
Al-Quwa Al-Siyara		1–2	2–1					1–1
Al-Sikak Al-Hadeed		2–2	6–3				2–0	1–1
Kahrabaa Al-Wusta	1–0 (Note: The Kahrabaa Al-Wusta–Al-Firqa Al-Thalitha match originally ended in a 0–0 draw but was changed to a 1–0 win for Kahrabaa Al-Wusta due to the referee incorrectly disallowing a goal for Kahrabaa Al-Wusta.)	–			0–0	1–3		
Maslahat Naqil Al-Rukab	1–0	1–1	2–0	2–1		4–1		

Source: Ali Al-Sabti Archive
Legend: Blue = home team win; Yellow = draw; Red = away team win.
