= 1965 Iraq Central FA Perseverance Cup =

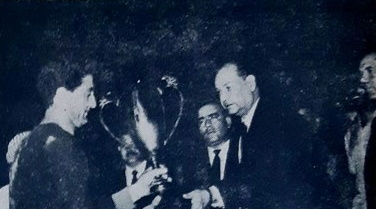
Maslahat Naqil Al-Rukab	Aliyat Al-Shorta
1	0
- After extra time
- Date: 4 June 1965
- Venue: Al-Kashafa Stadium, Baghdad
- Referee: Salih Faraj

The 1965 Iraq Central FA Perseverance Cup was the 4th edition of the Iraq Central FA Perseverance Cup, and the first since the competition's name was changed from Altruism Cup to Perseverance Cup. The match was contested between the winners and runners-up of the 1964–65 edition of the Iraq Central FA Premier League, Maslahat Naqil Al-Rukab and Aliyat Al-Shorta respectively. Maslahat Naqil Al-Rukab won the game 1–0 with an extra-time goal by Qais Hameed to win the cup for the first time in their history.

== Match ==
=== Details ===
4 June 1965

Maslahat Naqil Al-Rukab	1–0 (a.e.t.)	Aliyat Al-Shorta
Hameed 92'

Al-Kashafa Stadium, Baghdad
Referee: Salih Faraj
Assistant referees: Subhi Adeeb, Saadi Abdul-Karim

Iraq Central FA Perseverance Cup
1965 winner
Maslahat Naqil Al-Rukab
1st title
