= 1961–62 Iraq Central FA First Division Cup =

Iraq Central FA Premier League
- Season: 1961–62
- Champions: Al-Quwa Al-Jawiya (2nd title)
- Relegated: Isalat Al-Mai
- Top goalscorer: Ammo Baba; Fakhri Mohammed Salman; Munib Mohammed; Georges Elias (4 goals each)

The 1961–62 Iraq Central FA First Division Cup was the 14th season of the Iraq Central FA Premier League (the top division of football in Baghdad and its neighbouring cities from 1948 to 1973). It kicked off on 24 October 1961 and ended on 27 April 1962.

The tournament started with the participation of eight teams, but Al-Shorta Select XI withdrew after playing two matches when the Iraq Central Football Association (IFA) enforced a rule preventing players from playing for institute-representative teams when they did not also work for the same institution. Furthermore, Amanat Al-Asima were disqualified for a breach of the rules, leaving just six teams remaining.

Unlike the previous five seasons, the IFA decided to hold the tournament in a round-robin format, meaning each team played each other team in the league once. The winners of the league were Al-Quwa Al-Jawiya, who won their second title. They then went on to win the 1962 Iraq Central FA Altruism Cup by beating Al-Kuliya Al-Askariya 4–2. Four players shared the top scorer award, each scoring four goals.

== League table ==
Pos	Team	Pld	W	D	L	GF	GA	GAv	Pts	Qualification or relegation
1	Al-Quwa Al-Jawiya	5	4	0	1	13	6	2.167	8	League Champions
2	Al-Kuliya Al-Askariya	5	3	1	1	11	8	1.375	7	
3	Al-Sikak Al-Hadeed	5	3	0	2	12	10	1.200	6	
4	Maslahat Naqil Al-Rukab	5	2	2	1	7	6	1.167	6	
5	Al-Firqa Al-Rabaa	5	1	1	3	5	13	0.385	3	
6	Isalat Al-Mai	5	0	0	5	1	6	0.167	0	Relegated to Iraq Central FA Second Division
7	Al-Shorta Select XI (Note: Al-Shorta Select XI withdrew from the tournament after playing two matches, and their results were annulled.)	0	0	0	0	0	0	—	0	
8	Amanat Al-Asima (Note: Amanat Al-Asima were disqualified for violating IFA instructions, and their results were annulled.)	0	0	0	0	0	0	—	0	

Source: Ali Al-Sabti Archive

== Results ==
Home \ Away	FRB	KUL	QWJ	SHR	SIK	AMN	ISA	MAS
Al-Firqa Al-Rabaa		0–3		– (Note: The result of the Al-Firqa Al-Rabaa–Al-Shorta Select XI match was annulled after Al-Shorta Select XI withdrew from the league.)	2–4			1–1
Al-Kuliya Al-Askariya			2–4				1–0 (Note: The Al-Kuliya Al-Askariya–Isalat Al-Mai match originally ended in a 6–2 win for Isalat Al-Mai but was changed to a 1–0 win for Al-Kuliya Al-Askariya due to Isalat Al-Mai fielding students in their lineup which was not allowed for institute-representative teams.)	
Al-Quwa Al-Jawiya	5–1				3–1			0–2
Al-Shorta Select XI (Note: Al-Shorta Select XI withdrew from the tournament after playing two matches, and their results were annulled.)					– (Note: The result of the Al-Shorta Select XI–Al-Sikak Al-Hadeed match was annulled after Al-Shorta Select XI withdrew from the league.)			
Al-Sikak Al-Hadeed		2–3				– (Note: The Al-Sikak Al-Hadeed–Amanat Al-Asima match ended in a 1–0 win for Amanat Al-Asima but the result was annulled after Amanat Al-Asima were disqualified from the league.)	2–1	
Amanat Al-Asima (Note: Amanat Al-Asima were disqualified for violating IFA instructions, and their results were annulled.)								
Isalat Al-Mai	0–1 (Note: The Isalat Al-Mai–Al-Firqa Al-Rabaa match was awarded as a 1–0 win to Al-Firqa Al-Rabaa, as Isalat Al-Mai refused to play the game.)		0–1 (Note: The Isalat Al-Mai–Al-Quwa Al-Jawiya match was awarded as a 1–0 win to Al-Quwa Al-Jawiya, as Isalat Al-Mai refused to play the game.)					0–1 (Note: The Isalat Al-Mai–Maslahat Naqil Al-Rukab match originally ended 1–1 but was changed to a 1–0 win for Maslahat Naqil Al-Rukab due to Isalat Al-Mai fielding students in their lineup which was not allowed for institute-representative teams.)
Maslahat Naqil Al-Rukab		2–2			1–3			

Source: Ali Al-Sabti Archive
Legend: Blue = home team win; Yellow = draw; Red = away team win.

== Top goalscorers ==
Pos	Scorer	Goals	Team
1	Ammo Baba	4	Al-Quwa Al-Jawiya
1	Fakhri Mohammed Salman	4	Al-Quwa Al-Jawiya
1	Munib Mohammed	4	Al-Kuliya Al-Askariya
1	Georges Elias	4	Al-Sikak Al-Hadeed
