= 1956–57 Iraq Central FA First Division Cup =

Iraq Central FA Premier League
- Season: 1956–57
- Champions: Maslahat Naqil Al-Rukab (1st title)
- Relegated: Al-Ghazl wal-Naseej; Al-Hawat

The 1956–57 Iraq Central FA First Division Cup was the ninth season of the Iraq Central FA Premier League (the top division of football in Baghdad and its neighbouring cities from 1948 to 1973) and the first season under the name of Iraq Central FA First Division Cup. Six teams competed in the tournament, which started on 18 December 1956.

It was played as a double-elimination tournament, with Maslahat Naqil Al-Rukab winning their first title by beating Al-Quwa Al-Jawiya Al-Malakiya 1–0 in the final.

== Final positions ==
Pos	Team	Qualification or relegation
1	Maslahat Naqil Al-Rukab	League Champions
2	Al-Quwa Al-Jawiya Al-Malakiya	
3	Al-Shorta Select XI	
4	Al-Athori	
5	Al-Numan	
6	Al-Ghazl wal-Naseej	Relegated to Iraq Central FA Second Division Cup

Note: Al-Adhamiya and Al-Hawat dropped out of the tournament. Al-Adhamiya returned for the following season.

== Upper bracket ==
=== Summary ===
Home team	Score	Away team
Upper round 1
Al-Quwa Al-Jawiya Al-Malakiya	1–1 (a.e.t.); 3–1 (replay)	Al-Numan
Al-Athori	2–1 (Note: Original match was abandoned after 45 minutes at 1–1 due to an unsuitable pitch.)	Al-Ghazl wal-Naseej
Upper round 2
Al-Quwa Al-Jawiya Al-Malakiya	2–1	Al-Shorta Select XI
Maslahat Naqil Al-Rukab	W–L	Al-Athori
Upper final
Maslahat Naqil Al-Rukab	W–L	Al-Quwa Al-Jawiya Al-Malakiya

=== Upper round 1 ===
18 December 1956

Al-Quwa Al-Jawiya Al-Malakiya	1–1 (a.e.t.)	Al-Numan

19 January 1957
15:00 UTC+03:00

Al-Quwa Al-Jawiya Al-Malakiya	3–1	Al-Numan
Taha 13'; Simsim 60'; Hammadi 75'		Yousif 79'

Al-Shorta Stadium, Baghdad
Referee: Fahmi Al-Qaimaqchi

Al-Numan move to the lower bracket

December 1956

Al-Athori	1–1 at 45'	Al-Ghazl wal-Naseej
Baba		Karim

The match was ended at half-time due to an unsuitable pitch
23 January 1957
15:00 UTC+03:00

Al-Athori	2–1	Al-Ghazl wal-Naseej
Baba 5'; Odisho 47'		Majid

Al-Kashafa Stadium, Baghdad

Al-Ghazl wal-Naseej move to the lower bracket

=== Upper round 2 ===
27 January 1957

Al-Quwa Al-Jawiya Al-Malakiya	2–1	Al-Shorta Select XI
Chico 20'		Al-Husseini

Muaskar Al-Rasheed Stadium, Baghdad

Al-Shorta Select XI move to the lower bracket

1957

Maslahat Naqil Al-Rukab	W–L	Al-Athori

Al-Athori move to the lower bracket

=== Upper final ===
1957

Maslahat Naqil Al-Rukab	W–L	Al-Quwa Al-Jawiya Al-Malakiya

Maslahat Naqil Al-Rukab advance to the final
Al-Quwa Al-Jawiya Al-Malakiya move to the lower bracket

== Lower bracket ==
=== Summary ===
Home team	Score	Away team
Lower round 1 (results not available); Lower round 2
Al-Shorta Select XI	1–1 (a.e.t.); 2–1 (replay)	Al-Athori
Lower final
Al-Quwa Al-Jawiya Al-Malakiya	2–0	Al-Shorta Select XI

=== Lower round 1 ===
Al-Ghazl wal-Naseej eliminated (results not available)

Al-Numan eliminated (results not available)

=== Lower round 2 ===
7 May 1957

Al-Shorta Select XI	1–1 (a.e.t.)	Al-Athori
Sahakian 57'		Ismail 88'

Attendance: 10,000
1957

Al-Shorta Select XI	2–1	Al-Athori

Al-Athori eliminated

=== Lower final ===
1957

Al-Quwa Al-Jawiya Al-Malakiya	2–0	Al-Shorta Select XI
Eshaya

Al-Quwa Al-Jawiya Al-Malakiya advance to the final
Al-Shorta Select XI eliminated

== Final ==
1957

Maslahat Naqil Al-Rukab	1–0	Al-Quwa Al-Jawiya Al-Malakiya
Karim

Iraq Central FA First Division Cup
1956–57 winner
Maslahat Naqil Al-Rukab
1st title
