= 1950–51 Iraq FA Baghdad First Division =

Iraq Central FA Premier League
- Season: 1950–51
- Champions: Al-Haras Al-Malaki (2nd title)

The 1950–51 Iraq FA Baghdad First Division League was the third season of the Iraq Central FA Premier League (the top division of football in Baghdad and its neighbouring cities from 1948 to 1973). Teams in the region were split into three divisions rather than two for the first time. The First Division started on 8 December 1950, and consisted of five teams.

After the completion of the regular season, a final stage was supposed to be held to determine the champion. However, the final stage was abandoned due to scheduling issues. Having topped the table in the regular season, Al-Haras Al-Malaki were considered to be the winners, although no trophy ceremony was held. After the failure to complete the finals, a new committee was formed by the Iraq Central Football Association to manage future competitions.

== Regular season ==
=== League table as at 30 January 1951 ===
The following is the most recent league table published by The Iraq Times newspaper as at 30 January 1951, not the final league table.

Pos	Team	Pld	W	D	L	GF	GA	GAv	Pts	Qualification or relegation
1	Al-Haras Al-Malaki	2	2	0	0	10	0	—	4	League Champions
2	Al-Malaki	2	2	0	0	4	1	4.000	4	
3	Al-Kuliya Al-Askariya Al-Malakiya	3	1	0	2	3	6	0.500	2	
4	Al-Quwa Al-Jawiya Al-Malakiya	1	0	1	0	1	1	1.000	1	
5	Al-Amir	4	0	1	3	2	12	0.167	1	

Source: The Iraq Times

=== Results up to 30 January 1951 ===
Home \ Away	AMR	HAR	KUL	MLK	QWJ
Al-Amir				0–2	1–1
Al-Haras Al-Malaki	7–0		3–0		
Al-Kuliya Al-Askariya Al-Malakiya	2–1				
Al-Malaki			2–1		
Al-Quwa Al-Jawiya Al-Malakiya					

Source: The Iraq Times
Legend: Blue = home team win; Yellow = draw; Red = away team win.
