= 1972–73 Iraq Central FA First Division =

Iraq Central FA Premier League
- Season: 1972–73
- Champions: Al-Quwa Al-Jawiya (4th title)
- Top goalscorer: Bashar Rashid (5 goals)

The 1972–73 Iraq Central FA First Division League was the 25th and last season of the Iraq Central FA Premier League (the top division of football in Baghdad and its neighbouring cities from 1948 to 1973); it began on 16 October 1972. The first half of the season concluded on 31 December 1972 at which point the season was ended; this was due to scheduling difficulties with the Iraq national and military teams' matches that caused the cancellation of the second half of the season. Al-Quwa Al-Jawiya, who led the table at the halfway point having won all of their seven games, were thus crowned champions for their fourth league title.

After the premature end to the season, the Iraq Central Football Association organised the Independent Baghdad Tournament between the same eight teams to allow them to continue playing matches in the absence of their national team and military team players.

The Central FA Premier League along with the leagues in other provinces such as Basra, Kirkuk and Mosul were replaced by a nationwide league, the Iraqi National First Division League, from the following season.

== Name changes ==
- Al-Firqa Al-Thalitha renamed to Quwat Salahaddin.

== League table ==
Pos	Team	Pld	W	D	L	GF	GA	GD	Pts	Qualification
1	Al-Quwa Al-Jawiya	7	7	0	0	11	2	+9	14	League Champions
2	Aliyat Al-Shorta	7	3	3	1	8	2	+6	9	
3	Al-Mushat	7	4	0	3	6	5	+1	8	
4	Quwat Salahaddin	7	2	2	3	3	4	−1	6	
5	Shortat Al-Najda	7	2	2	3	4	9	−5	6	
6	Maslahat Naqil Al-Rukab	7	1	3	3	4	6	−2	5	
7	Al-Sikak Al-Hadeed	7	1	3	3	3	6	−3	5	
8	Kahrabaa Al-Wusta	7	0	3	4	3	8	−5	3	

Source: Ali Al-Sabti Archive

== Results ==
Home \ Away	ASH	KAH	MUS	QWJ	SIK	MAS	QSD	SHN
Aliyat Al-Shorta		0–0		0–1		0–0		4–0
Kahrabaa Al-Wusta			0–1		1–1		0–0	
Al-Mushat	0–2			0–1		2–0		1–0
Al-Quwa Al-Jawiya		1–0			2–0		1–0	
Al-Sikak Al-Hadeed	1–2		0–1			0–0		0–0
Maslahat Naqil Al-Rukab		3–1		1–2			0–1	
Quwat Salahaddin	0–0		2–1		0–1			0–1
Shortat Al-Najda		2–1		1–3		0–0		

Source: Ali Al-Sabti Archive
Legend: Blue = home team win; Yellow = draw; Red = away team win.

== Top goalscorers ==
Pos	Scorer	Goals	Team
1	Bashar Rashid	5	Aliyat Al-Shorta
2	Ammo Yousif	4	Al-Quwa Al-Jawiya
3	Malik Yaseen	3	Maslahat Naqil Al-Rukab
