= 1951–52 Iraq FA Baghdad First Division =

Iraq Central FA Premier League
- Season: 1951–52
- Champions: Al-Haras Al-Malaki (3rd title)

The 1951–52 Iraq FA Baghdad First Division League was the fourth season of the Iraq Central FA Premier League (the top division of football in Baghdad and its neighbouring cities from 1948 to 1973). Al-Haras Al-Malaki won their third consecutive league title.

Al-Amir withdrew from the competition before the start of the season. For the first time, the Civil Cantonment (CC) select team from Habbaniya participated in the competition. In January 1952, they defeated Al-Haras Al-Malaki 5–2 at Al-Kashafa Stadium with a hat-trick from Aram Karam. They later played Al-Quwa Al-Jawiya Al-Malakiya with the match ending in a draw after extra time. Al-Quwa Al-Jawiya Al-Malakiya won the replay 5–2.
