= Baghdad Cup (disambiguation) =

The Baghdad Cup was a friendly football match played between Al-Shorta and Al-Zawraa on 16 June 2013 at Al-Shaab Stadium to conclude the Festival of Brotherhood, Love and Peace.

Baghdad Cup may also refer to:

- Iraq FA Baghdad Cup, a tournament organised by the Iraq Football Association in 1974
- Baghdad Championship, an annual tournament organised by the Iraq Football Association from 1991 until 2004
- Independent Baghdad Tournament, a tournament organised by the Iraq Football Association in 1973
