= 1949–50 Iraq FA Baghdad First Division =

Iraq Central FA Premier League
- Season: 1949–50
- Champions: Al-Haras Al-Malaki (1st title)

The 1949–50 Iraq FA Baghdad First Division League was the second season of the Iraq Central FA Premier League (the top division of football in Baghdad and its neighbouring cities from 1948 to 1973). The competition started on 25 November 1949. Ittihad Muntada Al-Karkh decided not to field a team for the season, and Jihad Al-Karkh (winners of the Second Division in the previous season) also did not enter a team. Al-Haras Al-Malaki won the title for the first time.

== League table as at 10 February 1950 ==
The following is the most recent league table published by The Iraq Times newspaper as at 10 February 1950, not the final league table.

Pos	Team	Pld	W	D	L	GF	GA	GAv	Pts	Qualification or relegation
1	Al-Haras Al-Malaki	5	4	1	0	23	2	11.500	9	League Champions
2	Al-Kuliya Al-Askariya Al-Malakiya	3	3	0	0	6	2	3.000	6	
3	Al-Amir	3	2	1	0	5	2	2.500	5	
4	Al-Hawat	4	2	0	2	3	4	0.750	4	
5	Al-Quwa Al-Jawiya Al-Malakiya	2	1	0	1	7	3	2.333	2	
6	Wizarat Al-Maarif	3	1	0	2	4	8	0.500	2	
7	Al-Ahli	6	1	0	5	3	10	0.300	2	
8	Casuals	4	0	0	4	3	23	0.130	0	

Source: The Iraq Times

== Results up to 10 February 1950 ==
Home \ Away	AHL	AMR	HAR	HAW	KUL	QWJ	CAS	WIZ
Al-Ahli			– (Note: The match ended in a win for Al-Haras Al-Malaki.)	0–1	– (Note: The match ended in a win for Al-Kuliya Al-Askariya Al-Malakiya.)			
Al-Amir	2–0							2–1
Al-Haras Al-Malaki		1–1		–			13–0	6–1
Al-Hawat					–			
Al-Kuliya Al-Askariya Al-Malakiya						2–1		
Al-Quwa Al-Jawiya Al-Malakiya							6–1	
Casuals	– (Note: The match ended in a win for Al-Ahli.)			– (Note: The match ended in a win for Al-Hawat.)				
Wizarat Al-Maarif	2–0							

Source: The Iraq Times
Legend: Blue = home team win; Yellow = draw; Red = away team win.
