= 1952–53 Iraq FA Baghdad First Division =

Iraq Central FA Premier League
- Season: 1952–53
- Champions: Al-Haras Al-Malaki (4th title)

The 1952–53 Iraq FA Baghdad First Division League was the fifth season of the Iraq Central FA Premier League (the top division of football in Baghdad and its neighbouring cities from 1948 to 1973). Al-Haras Al-Malaki won their fourth consecutive league title.
