= Kadhim Shabib =

Iraqi footballer

Personal information
- Date of birth: 1 July 1952 (age 74)
- Position: Goalkeeper

Senior career*
Years	Team	Apps	(Gls)
1968-1970	Al-Muwassalat		
1970-1972	َBaghdad forces		
1972-1975	Al Bareed		
1975-1987	Al-Quwa Al-Jawiya		

International career
1976–1984	Iraq		
- * Club domestic league appearances and goals

Kadhim Shabib (Arabic: كَاظِم شَبِيب; born 1 July 1952) is an Iraqi former footballer. He competed in the men's tournament at the 1980 Summer Olympics. Shabib played for Iraq between 1976 and 1984.
