= Nassir Chico =

Iraqi footballer (1917–1991)

Nassir Yousef
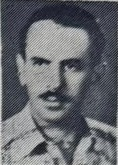
- Yousef in 1966 or earlier

Personal information
- Date of birth: 1917
- Place of birth: Baghdad, Iraq
- Position: Forward

Senior career*
Years	Team	Apps	(Gls)
1936–1959	Al-Quwa Al-Jawiya		

International career
1951	Iraq		
- * Club domestic league appearances and goals

Nassir "Chico" Yousef (1917 – 26 September 1991) was an Iraqi footballer, who played as a forward for Al-Quwa Al-Jawiya and the Iraq national team, playing for the first Iraqi team in 1951 during the 1950s.

== Early life ==
Yousef was born in Baghdad in 1917 in the local Al-Ammar district in the Al-Abkhana area, near Al-Senak area in the Iraqi capital. He scored goals from various angles and situations.

Yousef studied at Tahra Primary School and has been practicing football from an early age. He was given the name Chico because of his size by a group of British soldiers during the start of his career during the late 1930s.

== Career ==
Yousef joined the Baghdad school team Maaraf Baghdad representing the Ministry of Education before he joined Al-Quwa Al-Jawiya in 1936, and continued to play for the team until he retired and turned to coaching. He stayed with the club until his retirement in 1959.

In 1938, the Ministry of Education established an unofficial Iraqi national team and Yousef, was selected to represent the team in a friendly match in Baghdad against Syrian Barada Club. He appeared for the Baghdad Select side in high-profiled international matches against the army teams of England and Poland in 1943.

Two years later (1945), Yousef played for the Baghdad Maaraf team against Lebanon, which ended with Iraq's victory in the two meetings (1–0) and (4–1). In 1950, he guested for the Royal Guards team for one match against the Pakistan national team in Baghdad.

Yousef was one of the eleven players who lined-up against Turkey B team in Ankara in 1951, to make up Iraq's first ever national team.

He was one of the Iraqi Army team which participated in the Arab Army Games in 1954 and played in the Six Team Army Tournament the next year in Tehran. Yousef helped Al-Quwa Al-Jawiya in Iraq since its 1931 founding, guiding them to a number of cups and championships during his long career with the club, which ended in 1959.

The Iraqi football writer Shaker Ismail nicknamed him 'the Eternal Footballing Legend'.

Nassir coached Amana Al-Asama to the Iraqi Central Cup Championship in 1959.
