= 1954–55 Iraq FA Baghdad First Division =

Iraq Central FA Premier League
- Season: 1954–55
- Champions: Al-Haras Al-Malaki (6th title)

The 1954–55 Iraq FA Baghdad First Division League was the seventh season of the Iraq Central FA Premier League (the top division of football in Baghdad and its neighbouring cities from 1948 to 1973). Al-Haras Al-Malaki won their sixth consecutive league title, beating the Civil Cantonment (C.C.) select team from Habbaniya in the final on 24 April 1955 at Al-Kashafa Stadium.

== Matches ==
=== Final ===
The C.C. team walked off the pitch late in the second half in protest at the referee's decision to award Al-Haras Al-Malaki a second penalty kick won by Ammo Baba. Al-Haras Al-Malaki were therefore awarded the trophy.

24 April 1955

Al-Haras Al-Malaki	w/o from	Civil Cantonment (C.C.)
Baba 63', 73' (pen.)	Report	David 35'

Al-Kashafa Stadium, Baghdad
Referee: Gordon T. Barnes

Iraq FA Baghdad First Division League
1954–55 winner
Al-Haras Al-Malaki
6th title
