= Shihab Jahid Ali =

Lieutenant General Shihab Jahid Ali
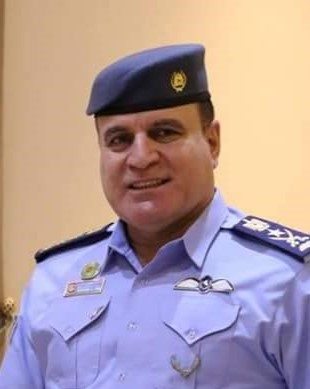

30th Commander of the Iraqi Air Force
- In office January 2020 – June 2025
- Preceded by: Gen. Anwar Hama Amin
- Succeeded by: Lt. Gen. Muhannad Ghalib al-Asadi

Personal details
- Born: Erbil, Iraq

Military service
- Allegiance: Iraq
- Branch/service: Air Force
- Years of service: 1980s–2025
- Rank: Lieutenant General
- Commands: Commander of the Air Force
- Battles/wars: Iran–Iraq War; Iraq War; War in Iraq (2013–2017)

Shihab Jahid Ali Hama Khan is a retired Iraqi Air Force general who served as the commander of the Air Force from January 2020 until his retirement in June 2025. He was also both the chairman of the board and the president of Air Force Football Club.
