= 1964 Iraq Central FA Altruism Cup =

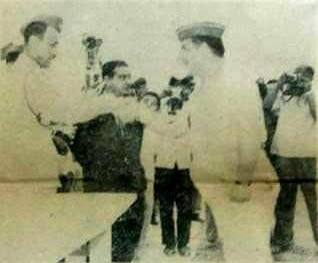
Al-Quwa Al-Jawiya	Al-Firqa Al-Thalitha
3	0
- Date: 25 May 1964
- Venue: Al-Kashafa Stadium, Baghdad

The 1964 Iraq Central FA Altruism Cup was the 3rd edition of the Iraq Central FA Perseverance Cup. The match was contested between the winners and runners-up of the 1963–64 edition of the Iraq Central FA Premier League, Al-Quwa Al-Jawiya and Al-Firqa Al-Thalitha respectively. Al-Quwa Al-Jawiya won the game 3–0.

== Match ==
=== Details ===
25 May 1964

Al-Quwa Al-Jawiya	3–0	Al-Firqa Al-Thalitha
Eshaya; Jeha; Atta

Al-Kashafa Stadium, Baghdad

Iraq Central FA Perseverance Cup
1964 winner
Al-Quwa Al-Jawiya
2nd title
