= Bashar Rashid =

Iraqi association football player

Personal information
- Full name: Bashar Rashid
- Date of birth: 1 January 1949
- Place of birth: Maysan, Kingdom of Iraq
- Date of death: 18 May 1978 (aged 29)
- Place of death: Baghdad, Iraqi Republic
- Position: Forward

Senior career*
Years	Team	Apps	(Gls)
1966–1968	Sikak Al-Hadeed		
1968–1970	Al-Quwa Al-Siyara		
1970–1975	Aliyat Al-Shorta		

International career
1973	Iraq		
- * Club domestic league appearances and goals

Bashar Rashid (Arabic: بَشَّار رَشِيد; 1 January 1949 – 18 May 1978) was an Iraqi football striker who played for Iraq in the 1974 FIFA World Cup qualification. He played for the national team in 1973.

On 15 September 1975, Bashar was imprisoned by the Ba'athist regime, sentenced to death in December 1976 and executed on 18 May, 1978 on charges of being a member of the Iraqi Communist Party.

== Career statistics ==
=== International goals ===
Scores and results list Iraq's goal tally first.

No	Date	Venue	Opponent	Score	Result	Competition
1.	13 March 1973	Sydney Sports Ground, Sydney	New Zealand	1–0	2–0	1974 FIFA World Cup qualification
