= 1962 Iraq Central FA Altruism Cup =

Al-Quwa Al-Jawiya	Al-Kuliya Al-Askariya
4	2
- Date: 21 May 1962
- Venue: Al-Kashafa Stadium, Baghdad

The 1962 Iraq Central FA Altruism Cup was the 1st edition of the Iraq Central FA Perseverance Cup. The match was contested between the winners and runners-up of the 1961–62 edition of the Iraq Central FA Premier League, Al-Quwa Al-Jawiya and Al-Kuliya Al-Askariya respectively. Al-Quwa Al-Jawiya won the game 4–2.

== Match ==
=== Details ===
21 May 1962

Al-Quwa Al-Jawiya	4–2	Al-Kuliya Al-Askariya
Eshaya 60'; Hammadi 63'; T. Mohammed 75'; Naji 85'		Jassam 17'; M. Mohammed 37'

Al-Kashafa Stadium, Baghdad

Iraq Central FA Perseverance Cup
1962 winner
Al-Quwa Al-Jawiya
1st title
