= 1955–56 Iraq FA Baghdad First Division =

Iraq Central FA Premier League
- Season: 1955–56
- Champions: Al-Haras Al-Malaki (7th title)

The 1955–56 Iraq FA Baghdad First Division League was the eighth season of the Iraq Central FA Premier League (the top division of football in Baghdad and its neighbouring cities from 1948 to 1973). Al-Haras Al-Malaki won their seventh consecutive league title. The team was disbanded at the end of the season.
