= Iraq Central FA Premier League =

Iraq Central FA Premier League Iraq Central FA First Division League
- Founded: 1948
- Folded: 1973
- Country: Iraq
- Number of clubs: 8
- Level on pyramid: 1
- Relegation to: Iraq Central FA Second Division League
- Domestic cup(s): Iraq FA Cup; Iraq Central FA Perseverance Cup
- International cup(s): Asian Champion Club Tournament
- Last champions: Al-Quwa Al-Jawiya (4th title)
- Most championships: Al-Haras Al-Malaki (7 titles)

The Iraq Central FA Premier League, also known as the Iraq Central FA First Division League and previously named the Iraq FA Baghdad First Division League (Arabic: دوري الاتحاد العراقي لمنطقة بغداد), was the top-level division of football in Baghdad and its neighbouring cities between 1948 and 1973.

It was controlled by the Iraq Central Football Association and was played under a variety of different formats including a double-elimination format, a round-robin format and a double round-robin format. It was one of several regional league championships played in Iraq at the time, with others including the Basra, Kirkuk and Mosul leagues. The last champions of the competition were Al-Quwa Al-Jawiya, who won the title in the 1972–73 season.

The regional leagues folded in 1973 and were replaced by the Iraqi National First Division League, before the Iraqi National Clubs First Division League was established in 1974. The competition has since often been referred to as the League of the Institutes (Arabic: دوري المؤسسات, romanized: Dawri Al-Muassasat) due to containing a number of teams representing different Iraqi institutions.

== List of champions ==
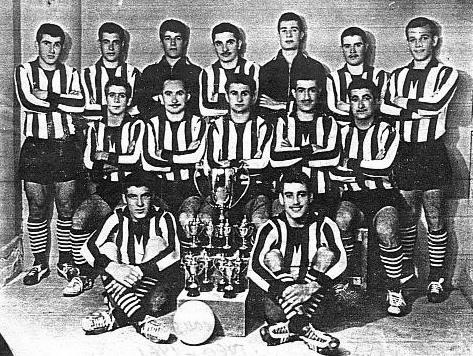
Al-Athori players with the trophy in the 1959–60 season.

Season	Champion
1948–49	Al-Kuliya Al-Askariya Al-Malakiya
1949–50	Al-Haras Al-Malaki
1950–51	Al-Haras Al-Malaki
1951–52	Al-Haras Al-Malaki
1952–53	Al-Haras Al-Malaki
1953–54	Al-Haras Al-Malaki
1954–55	Al-Haras Al-Malaki
1955–56	Al-Haras Al-Malaki
1956–57	Maslahat Naqil Al-Rukab
1957–58	Al-Quwa Al-Jawiya Al-Malakiya (Note: Renamed to Al-Quwa Al-Jawiya in 1958.)
1958–59	Amanat Al-Asima
1959–60	Al-Athori
1960–61	Maslahat Naqil Al-Rukab

Season	Champion
1961–62	Al-Quwa Al-Jawiya
1962–63	Al-Shorta Select XI
1963–64	Al-Quwa Al-Jawiya
1964–65	Maslahat Naqil Al-Rukab
1965–66	Al-Firqa Al-Thalitha
1966–67	N/A (season cancelled due to war)
1967–68	Aliyat Al-Shorta
1968–69	Aliyat Al-Shorta
1969–70	Aliyat Al-Shorta
1970–71	Maslahat Naqil Al-Rukab
1971–72	Aliyat Al-Shorta
1972–73	Al-Quwa Al-Jawiya

=== Most successful teams ===
#	Club	Titles	Winning seasons
1	Al-Haras Al-Malaki	7	1949–50, 1950–51, 1951–52, 1952–53, 1953–54, 1954–55, 1955–56
2	Maslahat Naqil Al-Rukab	4	1956–57, 1960–61, 1964–65, 1970–71
2	Aliyat Al-Shorta	4	1967–68, 1968–69, 1969–70, 1971–72
2	Al-Quwa Al-Jawiya	4	1957–58, 1961–62, 1963–64, 1972–73
5	Al-Kuliya Al-Askariya Al-Malakiya	1	1948–49
5	Amanat Al-Asima	1	1958–59
5	Al-Athori	1	1959–60
5	Al-Shorta Select XI	1	1962–63
5	Al-Firqa Al-Thalitha	1	1965–66

== Winning managers ==
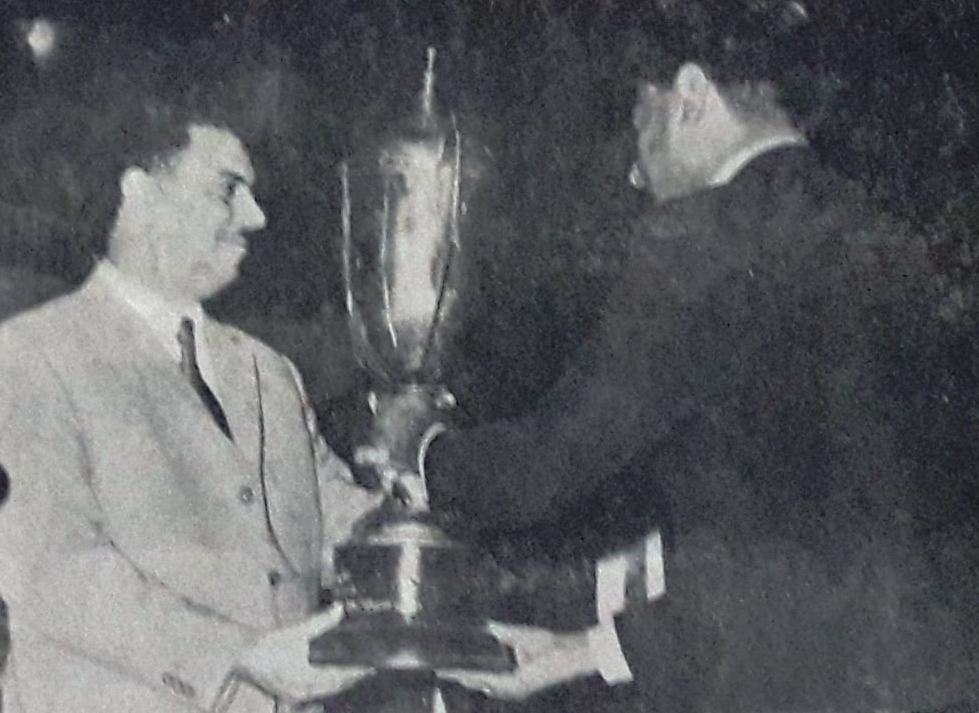
Mohammed Najeeb Kaban receives the trophy in the 1969–70 season.

Season	Nationality	Winning manager	Team
1948–49	Iraq	Hamid Qadir Al-Samarrai	Al-Kuliya Al-Askariya Al-Malakiya
1949–50	Iraq	Nadhim Al-Tabaqchali	Al-Haras Al-Malaki
1950–51	Iraq	Nadhim Al-Tabaqchali	Al-Haras Al-Malaki
1951–52	Iraq	Nadhim Al-Tabaqchali	Al-Haras Al-Malaki
1952–53	Iraq	Nadhim Al-Tabaqchali	Al-Haras Al-Malaki
1953–54	Iraq	Ahmed Abdul-Razzaq	Al-Haras Al-Malaki
1954–55	Palestine	Dennis Nasrawi	Al-Haras Al-Malaki
1955–56	Palestine	Dennis Nasrawi	Al-Haras Al-Malaki
1956–57	Iraq	Ismail Mohammed	Maslahat Naqil Al-Rukab
1957–58	Iraq	Aziz Jassim Al-Hajia	Al-Quwa Al-Jawiya Al-Malakiya
1958–59	Iraq	Nassir Yousef	Amanat Al-Asima
1959–60	Iraq	Ammo Baba	Al-Athori
1960–61	Iraq	Salman Jassim	Maslahat Naqil Al-Rukab
1961–62	Iraq	Salih Faraj	Al-Quwa Al-Jawiya
1962–63	Iraq	Fahmi Al-Qaimaqchi	Al-Shorta Select XI
1963–64	Iraq	Shawqi Aboud	Al-Quwa Al-Jawiya
1964–65	Iraq	Ismail Mohammed	Maslahat Naqil Al-Rukab
1965–66	Iraq	Abdelilah Mohammed Hassan	Al-Firqa Al-Thalitha
1967–68	Iraq	Mohammed Najeeb Kaban	Aliyat Al-Shorta
1968–69	Iraq	Mohammed Najeeb Kaban	Aliyat Al-Shorta
1969–70	Iraq	Mohammed Najeeb Kaban	Aliyat Al-Shorta
1970–71	Iraq	Mohammed Thamir	Maslahat Naqil Al-Rukab
1971–72	Iraq	Mohammed Najeeb Kaban	Aliyat Al-Shorta
1972–73	Iraq	Abdelilah Mohammed Hassan	Al-Quwa Al-Jawiya

== See also ==
- Iraq FA Basra Premier League
- Iraq FA Kirkuk Premier League
- Iraqi National First Division
- Iraq Stars League
- Iraqi Women's Football League
