= Salih Faraj =

Iraqi basketball player (born 1926)

Personal information
- Nationality: Iraqi
- Born: 1926

Sport
- Sport: Basketball, football

Salih Faraj, alternatively spelled as Saleh Faraj (born 1926), was an Iraqi basketball player. He competed in the men's tournament at the 1948 Summer Olympics. Faraj played six matches at the 1948 Olympic Games in London and managed six points.

== Career ==
Faraj was a multi-sport athlete, particularly regularly participating in football and basketball.

=== Basketball ===
Faraj was an exceptional player, being a part of the Iraq national basketball team for their participation at the 1948 Summer Olympics.

=== Football ===
Faraj was also an excellent football player, playing for the Al-Haras Al-Malaki football club. He also represented the Iraq national football team on several occasions during the early 1950s.

In 1950, during the Pakistan national football team's tour to Iran and Iraq, the team would face Al-Haras Al-Malaki on 6 November, Faraj would find the net in the match, during the first half of the match.

== Post-retirement ==
After his retirement, Faraj would go on to serve as a referee for the Iraq Football Association.
