= Qais Hameed =

Iraqi association football player

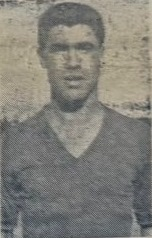

Personal information
- Full name: Qais Hameed
- Place of birth: Iraq
- Position: Forward

International career
Years	Team	Apps	(Gls)
1962–1966	Iraq	13	(2)

Qais Hameed (Arabic: قَيْس حَمِيد) is a former Iraqi football forward who played for Iraq between 1962 and 1966. He played 13 matches and scored 2 goals.

== Career statistics ==
=== International goals ===
Scores and results list Iraq's goal tally first.

No	Date	Venue	Opponent	Score	Result	Competition
1.	3 June 1962	National Stadium, Tehran	Iran	2–1	2–1	Friendly
2.	5 April 1966	Al-Kashafa Stadium, Baghdad	Bahrain	9–1	10–1	1966 Arab Nations Cup
