= Aliyat Al-Shorta SC =

Iraqi First Division League football club

- Full name: Aliyat Al-Shorta Sport Club
- Founded: 1961; 65 years ago (as a team); 2017; 9 years ago (as a club)
- Ground: Al-Walaa Stadium
- Chairman: Majid Falih Al-Moussawi
- Manager: Mustafa Mahmoud
- League: Iraqi First Division League
- 2025–26: Iraqi First Division League, 5th of 20
Home colours	Away colours

Aliyat Al-Shorta Sport Club (Arabic: نادي آليات الشرطة الرياضي, lit. 'Police Machinery Sport Club') is an Iraqi sports club based in Baghdad. Its football team plays in the Iraqi First Division League, the third tier of Iraqi football.

== History ==
The Aliyat Al-Shorta (Police Machinery) football team was founded in 1961 by the Police Games Committee. They were promoted to the Iraq Central FA First Division, the top division for teams in Baghdad and its neighbouring cities, in 1963 after winning the third and second divisions in succession. They clinched promotion with a 3–1 win over Al-Omma after extra time on 29 June 1963. Aliyat Al-Shorta went on to become one of the strongest teams in the region under the management of Mohammed Najeeb Kaban, winning three top-flight league titles in a row (1967–68, 1968–69 and 1969–70) and leading the league in the 1966–67 season before it was cancelled.

In 1971, Aliyat Al-Shorta became the first Iraqi team to take part in Asia's main club competition, the Asian Champion Club Tournament, and made history by becoming the first Arab side to reach the final. They won all the games they took to the field for en route to the final of the tournament, including two wins against the competition's defending champions Taj Tehran, but refused to face Israeli club Maccabi Tel Aviv for political reasons, waving the Palestinian flag around the field during the award ceremony and taking the runner-up spot. They were regarded as champions by the Iraqi media and were greeted with a heroes' welcome upon their return to the country, holding an open top bus parade. Aliyat Al-Shorta won the league title again in 1971–72, followed by two consecutive league runner-up finishes.

In 1974, the Iraq Football Association (IFA) decided to implement a clubs-only policy for domestic competitions, forming the Iraqi National Clubs League which was only open to clubs and not institute-representative teams such as Aliyat Al-Shorta. With the IFA dictating that only a single club would be allowed to represent the Police in the new top-flight, Al-Shorta Sports Club was provisionally established on 18 August 1974 by the Iraqi Olympic Committee, replacing Aliyat Al-Shorta, Shortat Al-Najda, Kuliyat Al-Shorta and Shortat Erbil in the top-flight. As a result, Aliyat Al-Shorta were consigned to competing in non-IFA tournaments, and the team finished in third place in the Armed Forces League in the 1974–75 season.

After that season, a proposal was made by former international referee Ghani Hussein Al-Jabouri for Aliyat Al-Shorta to enter the National Clubs League under the name Al-Dakhiliya SC but it was not approved. Ten players from Aliyat Al-Shorta subsequently joined Al-Shorta Sports Club to compete in the National Clubs League in the 1975–76 season, and from 1975, Aliyat Al-Shorta participated in the Iraqi Police Football League, which the team won on twelve occasions.

In 1989, Aliyat Al-Shorta registered to enter the Ministry of Interior tournaments for the first time. In 1992, Aliyat Al-Shorta were eliminated from the semi-finals of the National Security Championship with a 2–1 loss to Shorta Baghdad. In 2009, Aliyat Al-Shorta participated in the Minister of Interior Cup but were beaten 5–0 by Al-Jinsiya. In 2011, the Baghdad Police Command decided to dissolve the Aliyat Al-Shorta team but the Ministry of Interior prevented it from doing so after appeals from team members.

On 12 June 2017, Aliyat Al-Shorta were granted a preliminary establishment licence by the Ministry of Youth and Sports for a period of six months, allowing them to be established as a sports club once the foundation requirements were met. In November 2017, Aliyat Al-Shorta were granted the full licence and were registered as a sports club, entering the lower divisions of Iraqi club football organised by the IFA. In 2022, the club was promoted to the Iraqi Second Division League for the first time after a 2–1 win over Al-Atheer in Baghdad Group 2 of the 2021–22 Iraqi Third Division League. The club won the Iraqi Second Division League title in the 2024–25 season by beating Masafi Al-Shamal 3–1 in the final and were promoted to the Iraqi First Division League.

== Managers ==
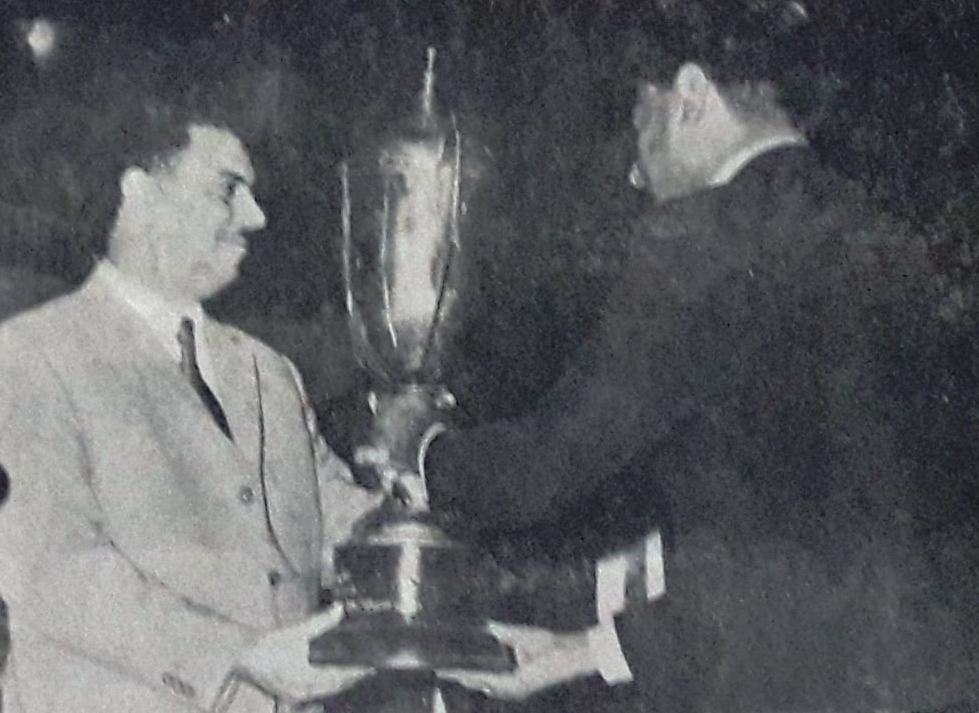
Mohammed Najeeb Kaban receiving the Iraq Central FA Premier League trophy in 1970.

Dates	Name
1961–1973	(Iraq) Mohammed Najeeb Kaban
1973–1974	(Iraq) Shaker Ismail
1983–1985	(Iraq) Sabah Hatim
1985–1986	(Iraq) Riyadh Nouri
1987–1988	(Iraq) Sabah Luaibi
1988–1991	(Iraq) Hassan Allawi
1991–2003	(Iraq) Nasser Noumi
2017–2018	(Iraq) Atta Hassan
2018–2019	(Iraq) Kadhim Yousef
2019–2020	(Iraq) Mustafa Mahmoud
2021–2023	(Iraq) Kadhim Yousef
2023–2024	(Iraq) Mustafa Mahmoud
2024	(Iraq) Azhar Tahir
2024–present	(Iraq) Mustafa Mahmoud

== Honours ==
=== Major ===
Type	Competition	Titles	Winning years	Runners-up
Domestic (national)	Iraqi National First Division (top tier)	0	–	1973–74
Domestic (national)	Iraqi Second Division League (fourth tier)	1	2024–25	–
Domestic (regional)	Iraq Central FA First Division (top tier)	4	1967–68, 1968–69, 1969–70, 1971–72	1964–65, 1970–71, 1972–73
Domestic (regional)	Iraq Central FA Second Division (second tier)	1	1962–63	–
Domestic (regional)	Iraq Central FA Third Division (third tier)	1	1961–62	–
Domestic (regional)	Iraq Central FA Perseverance Cup	0	–	1965
Domestic (regional)	Independent Baghdad Tournament	0	–	1973
Continental	Asian Champion Club Tournament	0	–	1971

=== Minor ===
- Iraqi Police Football League
  - Winners (12): including 1993, 1994, 1995, 1996, 1997, 1998, 1999, 2000
- Police Perseverance Cup
  - Winners (1): 2000
- Police Director General Cup
  - Winners (2): 1965, 1972
- Commander in Chief of the Armed Forces Cup
  - Winners (1): 1970
- Alexandria International Summer Tournament
  - Winners (1): 1967
- Police Cup Championship
  - Winners (1): 1965

== Statistics ==
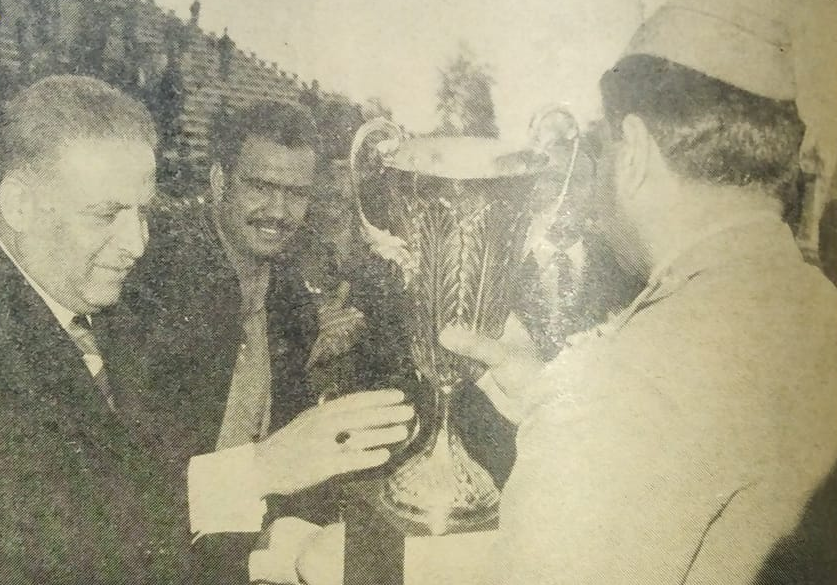
Mohammed Najeeb Kaban receiving the Iraq Central FA Premier League trophy in 1972.

=== In domestic competitions ===
==== Regional ====
Year	Central League	Baghdad Cup	Perseverance Cup
1961–62	Promoted (Div. 3)	Started in 1974	did not qualify
1962–63	Promoted (Div. 2)	Started in 1974	did not qualify
1963–64	Seventh place	Started in 1974	did not qualify
1964–65	Runner-up	Started in 1974	Runner-up
1965–66	Fourth place	Started in 1974	did not qualify
1966–67	not finished	Started in 1974	Abolished in 1966
1967–68	Winner	Started in 1974	Abolished in 1966
1968–69	Winner	Started in 1974	Abolished in 1966
1969–70	Winner	Started in 1974	Abolished in 1966
1970–71	Runner-up	Started in 1974	Abolished in 1966
1971–72	Winner	Started in 1974	Abolished in 1966
1972–73	Runner-up	Started in 1974	Abolished in 1966
1973–74	Folded in 1973	Quarter-final	Abolished in 1966

==== National ====
Year	National First Division
1973–74	Runner-up
