= Al-Haras Al-Malaki =

Iraqi football club

- Full name: Al-Haras Al-Malaki
- Founded: 1947
- Dissolved: 1956
- President: Obaid Abdullah Al-Mudhayfi
- League: Iraq Central FA Premier League

Al-Haras Al-Malaki (Arabic: فريق الحرس الملكي, lit. 'Royal Guard') was an Iraqi football team based in Baghdad. They participated in the first ever national cup tournament held in Iraq: the 1948–49 Iraq FA Cup. They also won seven Iraq Central FA Premier League titles in a row (the top-tier league for teams from Baghdad and its neighbouring cities between 1948 and 1973), making them the most successful team in the tournament's history.

== History ==
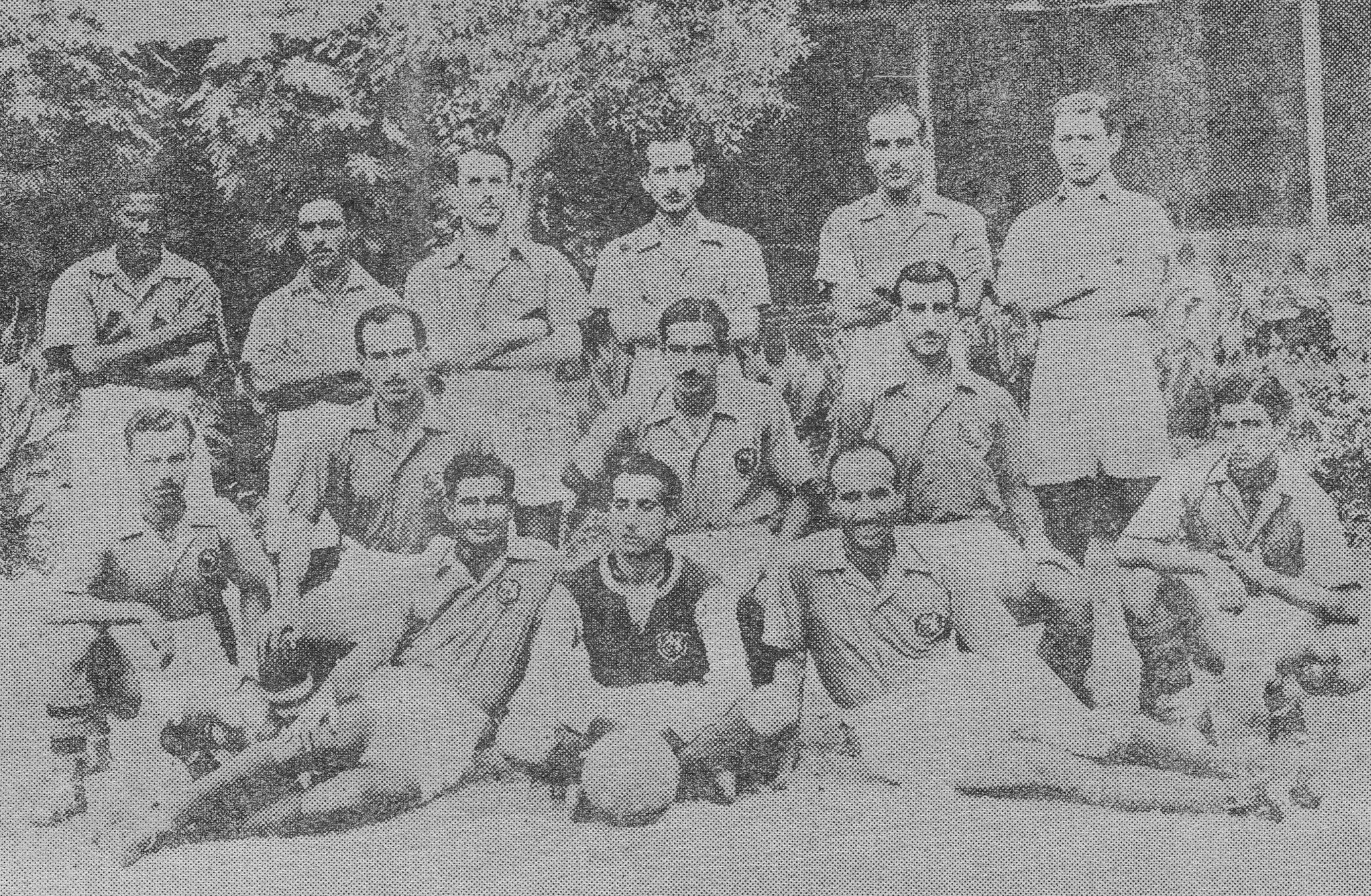
Al-Haras Al-Malaki players in 1948

The club participated in the first ever national cup tournament held in Iraq: the 1948–49 Iraq FA Cup. They also won seven Iraq Central FA Premier League titles in a row (the top-tier league for teams from Baghdad and its neighbouring cities between 1948 and 1973).

In 1950, the club played an unofficial friendly against the Pakistan national team on their tour to Iran and Iraq in the national team's international debut. In Iraq, due to the Iraqi FA's inability to gather a full national team, Pakistan played an unofficial friendly against the club resulting in a 1–1 draw.

== Honours ==
- Iraq Central FA Premier League
  - Winners (7): 1949–50, 1950–51, 1951–52, 1952–53, 1953–54, 1954–55, 1955–56 (record)
- Army Cup
  - Winners (4): 1948, 1950, 1955, 1956 (shared record)
- Jamal Baban Cup
  - Winners (2): 1948, 1951
