= Quwat Salahaddin =

Iraqi football club

- Full name: Quwat Salahaddin Al-Ayoubi
- Founded: 1957
- Dissolved: 1975; 50 years ago
- League: Iraqi National First Division
Home colours	Away colours

Quwat Salahaddin (Arabic: فريق قوات صلاح الدين, lit. 'Salahaddin Forces'), formerly known as Al-Firqa Al-Thalitha (Arabic: فريق الفرقة الثالثة, lit. 'Third Division'), was an Iraqi football team based in Habbaniyah which represented the 3rd Division of the Iraqi Army. The team competed in the Iraq Central FA Premier League from the 1962–63 season until the 1972–73 season, and also competed in Iraq's first national football league in the 1973–74 season.

== History ==
Quwat Salahaddin were founded in 1957 and were originally based in Baqubah before moving to Habbaniyah. The team was named Al-Firqa Al-Thalitha in 1962. They won the Iraq Central FA Premier League on one occasion in 1965–66 and also won the Iraq Central FA Perseverance Cup on two occasions in 1963 and 1966. In 1972, the team was renamed to Quwat Salahaddin.

In 1974, the Iraq Football Association decided to implement a clubs-only policy for domestic competitions, forming the Iraqi National Clubs League which was only open to clubs and not institute-representative teams such as Quwat Salahaddin. With the IFA dictating that only a single club would be allowed to represent the Army in the new top-flight, Al-Jaish Sports Club was established on 18 August 1974 by the Iraqi Olympic Committee, replacing Quwat Salahaddin, Quwat Al-Nasr and Al-Quwa Al-Bahriya in the top-flight.

Quwat Salahaddin participated in the 1974–75 Armed Forces League, after which most of the team's players joined Al-Jaish SC and the newly-formed Salahaddin SC.

== Honours ==
=== Major ===
- Iraq Central FA Premier League/First Division
  - Winners (1): 1965–66
  - Runners-up (3): 1962–63, 1963–64, 1969–70
- Iraq Central FA Second Division
  - Winners (1): 1961–62
- Iraq Central FA Perseverance Cup
  - Winners (2): 1963, 1966
  - Runners-up (1): 1964

=== Minor ===
- Army Cup
  - Winners (2): 1961, 1963
- Quartet Cup
  - Winners (1): 1963
