= Al-Naqil SC =

Iraqi football club

Al-Naqil
- Full name: Al-Naqil Sports Club
- Founded: 1937
- Dissolved: 1975; 50 years ago
- Final season; 1974–75: Iraqi National League, 2nd
Home colours	Away colours

Al-Naqil Sports Club (Arabic: نادي النقل الرياضي, meaning Transport Sports Club), was an Iraqi sports club based in Baghdad that was founded in 1937 under the name Al-Sikak Al-Hadeed (Arabic: السكك الحديد, meaning Railways). They were renamed Al-Naqil in 1974, competing in the first season of the Iraqi Premier League (the top tier of Iraqi club football) and finishing as runners-up.

The club was dissolved in 1975 as they had no administration or financial backing. Their football players left to join newly promoted club Al-Zawraa, who went on to become one of Iraqi football's most successful clubs.

Al-Naqil won the Independent Baghdad Tournament in 1973, which was a tournament held to allow teams to continue playing matches after the premature end to the 1972–73 Iraq Central FA First Division. They won the tournament by defeating Aliyat Al-Shorta 3–1 in the final match. They also reached the final of the 1974 Iraq FA Baghdad Cup, but they lost 2–1 against Al-Quwa Al-Jawiya.

== Honours ==
=== Domestic ===
==== National ====
- Iraq Stars League
  - Runners-up (1): 1974–75

==== Regional ====
- Iraq Central FA Second Division
  - Winners (1): 1965–66
- Iraq FA Baghdad Cup
  - Runners-up (1): 1974
- Independent Baghdad Tournament
  - Winners (1): 1973
- Iraq Central FA Second Division Perseverance Cup
  - Runners-up (1): 1966
