= Amanat Baghdad SC =

Iraqi football club

Amanat Baghdad
- Full name: Amanat Baghdad Sports Club
- Nicknames: Lions of the Capital, Qaher Al-Amaliqa
- Founded: 1 July 1957; 69 years ago (as Amanat Al-Asima)
- Ground: Amanat Baghdad Stadium
- Capacity: 5,000
- Chairman: Falah Mendeb Al-Masudi
- Manager: Wissam Talib
- League: Iraqi Premier Division League
- 2025–26: Iraq Stars League, 18th of 20 (relegated via play-offs)
- Website: www.baghdad-club.net
Home colours	Away colours

Amanat Baghdad Sports Club (Arabic: نادي أمانة بغداد الرياضي, lit. 'Mayoralty of Baghdad Sports Club') is an Iraqi professional football team based in Karkh District, Baghdad, that competes in the Iraqi Premier Division League, the second tier of Iraqi football. Formed in 1957 as Amanat Al-Asima (Arabic: أمانة العاصمة, lit. 'Capital Mayoralty'), the team merged with Al-Baladiyat SC in 1977, who had finished as runners-up of the 1975–76 Iraq FA Cup.

== History ==
On 1 July 1957, Amanat Al-Asima (Arabic: أمانة العاصمة, lit. 'Capital Mayoralty') were formed to represent the Mayoralty of Baghdad. Amanat Al-Asima won the Iraq Central FA Premier League title in the 1958–59 season and won the Police Director General Cup twice in 1959 and 1960.

In 1977, Amanat Al-Asima merged with Al-Baladiyat SC to form Al-Amana SC (Arabic: الأمانة). On 5 August 2009, Al-Amana SC was renamed to Baghdad SC (Arabic: بغداد). In 2014, Baghdad SC renamed to Amanat Baghdad SC (Arabic: أمانة بغداد).

=== Merged teams ===
==== Al-Baladiyat ====
Al-Baladiyat SC (Arabic: البلديات, lit. 'Municipalities') was a club formed in 1974 by the merger of Isalat Al-Mai and Maslahat Naqil Al-Rukab. Al-Baladiyat finished as runners-up of the Iraq FA Cup in the 1975–76 season.

===== Isalat Al-Mai =====
Isalat Al-Mai (Arabic: إسالة الماء, lit. 'Water Board') was a team formed in 1954. Isalat Al-Mai won the Iraq Central FA Second Division in the 1959–60 season.

===== Maslahat Naqil Al-Rukab =====
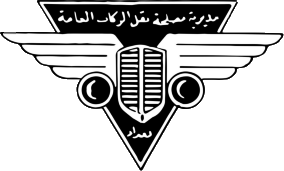
Maslahat Naqil Al-Rukab logo

Maslahat Naqil Al-Rukab (Arabic: مصلحة نقل الركاب, lit. 'Passenger Transport Service') was a team formed in 1956. Maslahat Naqil Al-Rukab won the Iraq Central FA Premier League four times in 1956–57, 1960–61, 1964–65 and 1970–71, and finished as runners-up in 1967–68. They also won the Iraq Central FA Perseverance Cup in 1965. The team wore red shirts.

== Stadium ==
Since 2011, Amanat Baghdad have got their own stadium. The Amanat Baghdad Stadium holds 5,000 people.

== Current squad ==
=== First-team squad ===
As of 30 May 2024

Note: Flags indicate national team as defined under FIFA eligibility rules; some limited exceptions apply. Players may hold more than one non-FIFA nationality.

No.	Pos.	Nation	Player
1	GK	IRQ	Hassan Abbas
4	DF	IRQ	Milad Falah
5	DF	IRQ	Safaa Jabbar
6	MF	IRQ	Jasim Mohammed
8	FW	CMR	Ernest Thierry Anang
9	MF	IRQ	Karrar Ali
11	MF	IRQ	Mohammed Ibrahim
13	DF	IRQ	Ayman Arzaij
14	DF	IRQ	Uday Shehab
16	GK	IRQ	Abdulsalem Hammad
18	MF	IRQ	Mohammed Sabah
21	MF	IRQ	Mohammed Khalid
26	DF	IRQ	Raad Fanar

No.	Pos.	Nation	Player
30	MF	IRQ	Hussein Ghazwan
35	MF	BFA	Lem Ismael Souleymane
53	DF	IRQ	Taqi Falah
55	MF	IRQ	Omar Adnan
66	MF	IRQ	Mohammed Ahmed
70	MF	CIV	Florent Didier Koré
77	MF	IRQ	Hussein Zeyad
80	FW	IRQ	Ridha Fadhil
88	FW	IRQ	Ali Khalil
90	DF	NIG	Karim Doudou
98	FW	IRQ	Ashar Ali
—	DF	IRQ	Ahmed Abdul-Hussein
—	MF	ALG	Sofiane Feghouli

== Technical staff ==
Position	Name	Nationality
Manager:	Wissam Talib	(Iraq)
Assistant manager:	Vacant	(Iraq)
Fitness coach:	Raad Salman	(Iraq)
Goalkeeping coach:	Haitham Khalil	(Iraq)
Team supervisor:	Ahmed Ezzat	(Iraq)

Updated to match played 3 August 2020

== Managerial history ==
- (Iraq) Ahmed Khalef (2015–2018)
- (Iraq) Thair Ahmed (2018)
- (Iraq) Essam Hamad (2018–2021)
- (Iraq) Jamal Ali (2021)
- (Iraq) Wissam Talib (2021–present)

== Honours ==
=== Major ===
National

- Iraqi Premier Division League (second tier)
  - Winners (1): 1990–91

Regional

- Iraq Central FA Premier League (top tier)
  - Winners (1): 1958–59

=== Minor ===
- Police Director General Cup
  - Winners (2): 1959, 1960

== Individual honours ==
2009 FIFA Confederations Cup

The following players have played in the FIFA Confederations Cup whilst playing for Al-Amana:
- (Iraq) 2009 – Essam Yassin
