= Al-Kuliya Al-Askariya =

Iraqi football club

- Full name: Al-Kuliya Al-Askariya
- Founded: 1937
- Dissolved: 1991; 35 years ago
- League: Iraq Central FA Premier League

Al-Kuliya Al-Askariya (Arabic: فريق الكلية العسكرية, lit. 'Military College'), known up until 1958 as Al-Kuliya Al-Askariya Al-Malakiya, was an Iraqi football team founded in 1937 in Baghdad which represented the Iraqi Military Academy. They were the runners-up of Iraq's first ever national cup when they lost the final of the 1948–49 Iraq FA Cup to Sharikat Naft Al-Basra. They were also the first ever winners of the Iraq Central FA Premier League, a regional league for teams from Baghdad and its neighbouring cities, when they earned the title in 1948–49. Their final season in the top-flight was 1969–70 when they were relegated to the region's second-tier.

Al-Kuliya Al-Askariya were consigned to competing in non-IFA competitions after 1974 following the introduction of a clubs-only league system in Iraq, and competed in Army competitions until 1991 when the team was disbanded along with several other Army teams due to the Gulf War.

== Honours ==
=== National ===
- Iraq FA Cup
  - Runners-up (1): 1948–49

=== Regional ===
- Iraq Central FA Premier League
  - Winners (1): 1948–49
  - Runners-up (1): 1961–62
- Iraq Central FA Perseverance Cup
  - Runners-up (1): 1962
