= Al-Quwa Al-Jawiya =

Association football club

- Full name: Al-Quwa Al-Jawiya (Air Force Sports Club)
- Nicknames: Al-Soqoor (The Falcons); Al-Areeq (The Deep-Rooted)
- Founded: 4 July 1931; 95 years ago as Gipsy Moth
- Ground: Al-Madina Stadium
- Capacity: 32,000
- President: Shihab Jahid
- Head coach: Rashid Jaber
- League: Iraq Stars League
- 2025–26: Iraq Stars League, 1st of 20 (champions)
| Home colours | Away colours |

Al-Quwa Al-Jawiya (Arabic: نادي القوة الجوية الرياضي, lit. 'Air Force Sports Club') is an Iraqi professional sports club based in Al-Rusafa, Baghdad that competes in the Iraq Stars League, the top flight of Iraqi football. Al-Quwa Al-Jawiya is the oldest existing football club in Iraq, having been founded in 1931 under the name Gipsy Moth by a group of Iraqi Air Force officers at RAF Hinaidi.

Its football team is one of the most successful in Iraq, having won eight Iraq Stars League titles, most recently in the 2025–26 season, while the club won its sixth Iraq FA Cup title in the 2022–23 season. The club has also won two Iraqi Super Cup titles and a joint-record three Baghdad Championship titles. In the 1996–97 season, Al-Quwa Al-Jawiya became the first club in Iraq to win all four major national trophies in the same season—a feat later matched by Al-Zawraa, with whom Al-Quwa Al-Jawiya share a fierce rivalry.

In international football, Al-Quwa Al-Jawiya has won a joint-record three AFC Cup titles (now known as AFC Champions League Two, Asia's second-tier club competition) in 2016, 2017 and 2018, becoming the first Iraqi club to win the tournament and the first club to win the trophy three times in a row. The team is nicknamed Al-Soqoor (lit. 'The Falcons').

== History ==
=== Foundation and early development (1931–1948) ===
On 4 July 1931, 73 days after the foundation of the Iraqi Air Force, the club was founded by a group of Iraqi flight policemen at the British Royal Air Force station of RAF Hinaidi, making it the oldest existing football club in Iraq. The club was named Gipsy Moth after the model of the first fleet of the Iraqi Air Force, but soon the club was renamed to Al-Quwa Al-Jawiya Al-Malakiya, simply meaning Royal Air Force. Dressed in army fatigues and short khakis, they played their very first game a day later against a team from RAF Habbaniya and won the match. The win over the British forces helped the club grow in popularity as many Iraqis began supporting the club as its reputation spread across the nation.

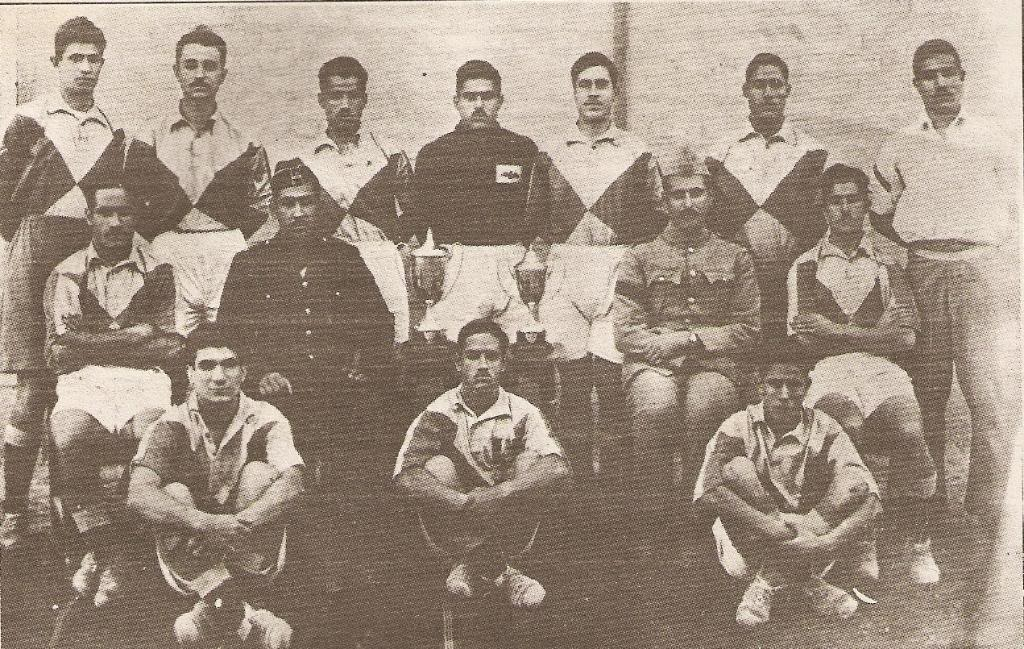
Al-Quwa Al-Jawiya Al-Malakiya's squad in 1933.

As the British forces and its leaders saw that the club's activities had broadened and its members and followers had multiplied which was clearly seen in the matches they played in, the British wanted to get rid of some of its leaders, but King Ghazi, who took over as ruler of Iraq in 1933, had a strong relationship with the Iraqi flight policemen and he invited the members to have talks to solve the problem. It was not long before a solution for the development of the club had been decided on and they came under the control of another branch of the Iraqi Air Force, which opened a number of doors for the club around areas in Iraq. They won their first trophy on 19 May 1933, defeating Al-Lasilki 1–0 after extra time in the final of the Prince Ghazi Cup, thanks to a goal by Nasser Hussein, wearing the colours of green and purple. Jawiya and Al-Haras Al-Malaki (meaning Royal Guard) became close rivals with the two teams regularly competing for the Iraq Central FA Premier League title (a league for teams in Baghdad and its neighbouring cities). This league competition started in 1948 and continued all the way until 1973 when the Central FA Premier League and other regional leagues were replaced by the Iraqi National First Division.

=== Central FA League success (1948–1974) ===
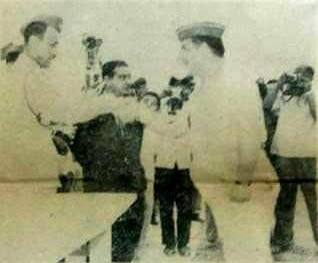
Al-Quwa Al-Jawiya being awarded the Iraq Central FA Altruism Cup trophy in 1964.

Jawiya were one of the six teams to compete in the 1956–57 season which saw a double-elimination format introduced for the first time. In 1957, Jawiya completed the signing of Ammo Baba, one of the best players in Iraqi football history, and won their first league title in Ammo's first season at the club in 1957–58, after Al-Shorta Select XI withdrew from the replay of the final. Al-Quwa Al-Jawiya Al-Malakiya were renamed to Al-Quwa Al-Jawiya (Air Force) when Iraq became a republic in 1958. The 1959–60 season saw Jawiya reach the final of the league again, but they lost 3–0 to Al-Athori. Jawiya secured their second league title in the 1961–62 season as the league changed to a round-robin format. This qualified them for the 1962 Iraq Central FA Altruism Cup (later known as Iraq Central FA Perseverance Cup) which they won by defeating Al-Kuliya Al-Askariya 4–2. Jawiya won the league title again in 1963–64 and also won the Iraq Central FA Altruism Cup again that year. They were once managed by Scotsman Frank Hill in the fifties, a player at Arsenal and manager at Notts County and Charlton Athletic – attempting on two separate occasions to sign Jawiya's star inside forward Ammo Baba. They had another British link as the team featured former Bristol Rovers reserve Youra Eshaya who went on to become one of the longest-serving players at the club from 1955 to 1971. Jawiya claimed their fourth title in 1972–73, winning the league with a 100% win record (seven wins from seven games).

=== Transition to club era (1974–1991) ===
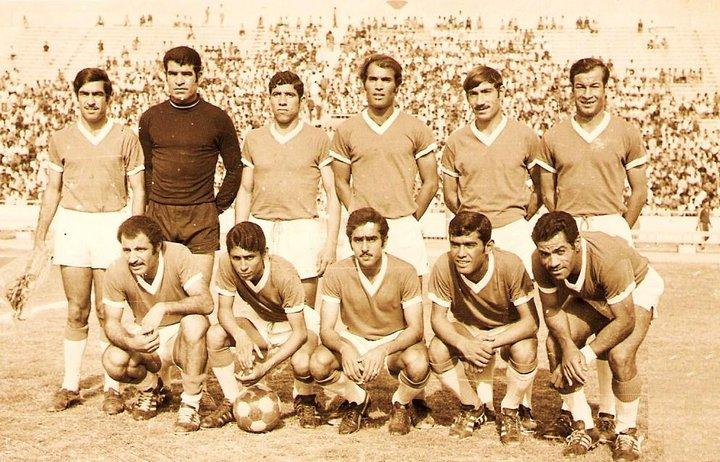
The club won three consecutive league titles (one regional, two national) in the 1970s.

The club continued their strong form and won the country's new nationwide league in the 1973–74 season. That season, Jawiya also won the first and only edition of the Iraq FA Baghdad Cup, a knockout tournament played between 20 teams from Baghdad and its neighbouring cities, by beating Al-Sikak Al-Hadeed 2–1 in the final. In 1974, the Iraq Football Association decided to form the Iraqi Premier League (then known as the Iraqi National Clubs League) which was only open to clubs rather than institute-representative teams, resulting in the club changing their name from Al-Quwa Al-Jawiya to Al-Tayaran (Airlines). The first ever edition of the Iraqi Premier League in the 1974–75 season saw Al-Tayaran claim the title, finishing just a single point above runners-up Al-Naqil, meaning they had won three league titles in a row (one Central FA First Division, one National First Division and one National Clubs League). All three titles were won under the management of Abdelilah Mohammed Hassan. Al-Tayaran won their first Iraq FA Cup title by beating Al-Shorta 5–3 on penalties in the 1978 final after a 1–1 draw, with Nadhum Shaker scoring the winning penalty.

=== Resurgence and domestic quadruple (1989–2003) ===
In the 1989–90 season, Al-Tayaran managed to win their second Premier League title, known as the National Clubs League at the time. They finished four points ahead of defending champions Al-Rasheed. 12 goals from Natiq Hashim were crucial in winning Amer Jamil's Al-Tayaran the title. Midway through the 1990–91 season, on 20 April 1991, the Ministry of Interior decided to dissolve all the clubs that were under its control including Al-Bahri (Navy Club), Al-Jaish (Army Club) and Al-Tayaran. However, after immense pressure from supporters of the club, Al-Tayaran returned to action on 12 May 1991, but returned to their old name of Al-Quwa Al-Jawiya.

The 1991–92 season saw Jawiya win their first ever national Double and goes down as one of the most successful seasons in the club's history. Managed by Adil Yousef, Jawiya claimed the title on the very last day of the season, defeating Al-Zawraa 1–0 in their last game thanks to an early goal by their top scorer Akram Emmanuel to overtake their opponents and claim the trophy. The game was controversial as Al-Zawraa scored a goal through Laith Hussein that was ruled out for offside; had the goal counted, Al-Zawraa would have retained their title. Jawiya coupled their league success with their second FA Cup win, defeating Al-Khutoot 2–1 in the cup final. Jawiya managed to win their first Umm al-Ma'arik Championship (later known as the Baghdad Championship) title in the 1994–95 season with a penalty shootout win over Al-Talaba after the game ended goalless.

Jawiya, under the leadership of Ayoub Odisho, started the 1996–97 season by winning the Umm al-Ma'arik Championship. Jawiya also managed to win the Iraqi Premier League with 22 wins from 30 games with their top scorer being Sabah Jeayer. Four days before clinching the league title, Jawiya won their third Iraq FA Cup with a penalty shootout victory against Al-Shorta in front of 50,000 spectators at Al-Shaab Stadium. Jawiya became history-makers by winning the Iraqi Super Cup 3–1 against Al-Zawraa at the end of the season to become the first team in Iraqi football history to win all four major domestic trophies in a single season. The joy of the 1996–97 campaign was followed by a heartbreaking 1997–98 season. Jawiya conceded a 97th-minute equalising penalty to Al-Zawraa in the 1998 Iraq FA Cup final and lost the ensuing penalty shootout. Jawiya then drew 1–1 against Al-Zawraa in their last league match of the season, and missed out on the title to Al-Shorta after Al-Shorta scored a 91st-minute winning penalty in their match against Al-Sulaikh. Jawiya players mistakenly thought that Al-Shorta had drawn their match which would have made them champions and they began celebrating on the field, with Ayoub Odisho giving an interview on live television. Midway through Odisho's interview, the stadium announcer declared that the final score of Al-Shorta's game was 3–2 and that Al-Shorta were officially the champions of Iraq. Jawiya clinched their third Umm al-Ma'arik Championship title in the 1998–99 season by beating Al-Naft in the final. Jawiya also managed to win the 2001 Iraqi Super Cup against Al-Zawraa with a 1–0 win.

=== Post-war rebuilding period (2003–2015) ===
In 2003 the club briefly changed their name back to Al-Tayaran before returning to the name Al-Quwa Al-Jawiya again. Jawiya entered the 2004–05 season in search of a fifth Premier League title, and they managed to achieve it by beating Al-Minaa 2–0 in the final coached by Sabah Abdul-Jalil.

2016 AFC Cup final starting line-up.

In the 2006–07 season, Jawiya reached the final of the league again but lost it to hosts Erbil by a score of 1–0. Their position as league runners-up qualified them for the 2008 AFC Champions League but they exited at the group stage for the third time in a row.

In the 2014–15 campaign, Jawiya qualified for the league final where they played newly promoted Naft Al-Wasat, and lost on penalties after a goalless draw. Jawiya won the 2015–16 Iraq FA Cup by defeating rivals Al-Zawraa 2–0, thus denying their opponents the Double.

=== AFC Cup dominance and modern era (2016–present) ===
By finishing as runners-up of the 2014–15 league, Jawiya qualified for the 2016 AFC Cup, Asia's second-tier club tournament. They reached the 2016 AFC Cup Final, where Hammadi Ahmed scored the only goal of the game against Indian side Bengaluru to become the first Iraqi club to win the AFC Cup and claim their first ever major continental trophy. Jawiya then went on to win the 2016–17 Iraqi Premier League, their sixth Premier League title, under the helm of Basim Qasim. They rounded off the season by winning their second consecutive AFC Cup, this time beating FC Istiklol 1–0 in the final. They then became the first team in history to win the AFC Cup three times in a row with a 2–0 win over Altyn Asyr in the 2018 final, and clinched their seventh Premier League title in the 2020–21 season under Ayoub Odisho, coupling it with the 2020–21 Iraq FA Cup title to earn their third national double.

== Stadiums ==
=== Al-Quwa Al-Jawiya Stadium ===
Al-Quwa Al-Jawiya's old stadium was located in Baghdad, near Falastin Street, opposite the former stadium site of their rivals Al-Shorta. It had a capacity of 6,000. The seats were light blue in colour. The stadium was demolished in July 2025 to make way for the construction of a new 15,000-seater stadium for the club which is expected to be completed in 2028.

=== Al-Madina Stadium ===
Al-Quwa Al-Jawiya currently play their home matches at Al-Madina Stadium in Baghdad.

== Kits ==
Al-Quwa Al-Jawiya's home kit is blue, while their away kit is red. The team has also worn white or yellow away kits in previous years.

== Rivalries ==
Al-Quwa Al-Jawiya's main rivals are Al-Zawraa, with whom they contest the Iraqi Classico. Jawiya also share a rivalry with Al-Shorta and Al-Talaba. There also exists a rivalry between Al-Quwa Al-Jawiya and Al-Minaa, which is sometimes called the Al-Araqa derby, because the two clubs are the oldest clubs in Iraq.

== Supporters ==
Al-Quwa Al-Jawiya are one of the traditional "Big Four" of Baghdad and thus have a large fanbase, concentrated mainly in Iraq's capital.

== Players ==
As of 2 September 2026

Note: Flags indicate national team as defined under FIFA eligibility rules; some limited exceptions apply. Players may hold more than one non-FIFA nationality.

| No. | Pos. | Nation | Player |
|---|---|---|---|
| 2 | DF | IRQ | Ruslan Hanoon (vice captain) |
| 3 | DF | IRQ | Muslim Mousa |
| 5 | DF | JOR | Saed Al-Rosan |
| 6 | DF | IRQ | Mohanad Jeahze |
| 7 | FW | NGR | Anthony Okpotu |
| 8 | FW | IRQ | Al-Hareth Hatam |
| 9 | FW | TUN | Haythem Jouini |
| 10 | FW | IRQ | Mohammad Jawad |
| 11 | FW | IRQ | Murad Mohammed |
| 13 | MF | IRQ | Mujtaba Mohsen Aeel |
| 16 | MF | NGR | Moses Orkuma |
| 17 | DF | IRQ | Abbas Adel |
| 18 | FW | IRQ | Ali Akbar Taher |

| No. | Pos. | Nation | Player |
|---|---|---|---|
| 19 | DF | ALG | Achraf Boudrama |
| 21 | DF | IRQ | Sipan Sediq |
| 22 | GK | IRQ | Zainulabdeen Nassif |
| 23 | MF | ARG | Tomás Andrade |
| 24 | MF | IRQ | Abbas Fawzi |
| 25 | MF | IRQ | Saad Abdul-Amir (captain) |
| 29 | FW | COD | Tuisila Kisinda |
| 31 | GK | IRQ | Mohammed Raheem |
| 73 | FW | IRQ | Ali Saad (on loan from Al-Talaba) |
| 77 | MF | IRQ | Mohammed Sami |
| 90 | DF | IRQ | Karar Ali Hassan |
| 95 | GK | IRQ | Mohammed Salih |

=== Reserve and Academy teams ===
Note: Flags indicate national team as defined under FIFA eligibility rules; some limited exceptions apply. Players may hold more than one non-FIFA nationality.

| No. | Pos. | Nation | Player |
|---|---|---|---|
| 12 | GK | IRQ | Mohammed Talib |
| 26 | MF | IRQ | Ahmed Ghassan |
| 33 | MF | IRQ | Mohammed Sadeq |
| 40 | MF | IRQ | Yasser Mohammed |

| No. | Pos. | Nation | Player |
|---|---|---|---|
| 41 | DF | IRQ | Mohammed Al-Munshid awi |
| 43 | MF | IRQ | Mustapha Ali |

== Managers ==
=== Current technical staff ===
| Position | Name | Nationality |
|---|---|---|
| Head coach | Rashid Jaber | (Oman) |
| Assistant coach | Ammar Zriqi | (Jordan) |
| Fitness coach | Ahmed Bahloul | (Tunisia) |
| Match analyst | Hamed Nizar Mahrous | (Syria) |
| Goalkeeping coach | Ahmad Jassim | (Iraq) |
| Technical advisor | Mahdi Jassim | (Iraq) |
| Administrative director | Jassim Ghulam | (Iraq) |
| Team supervisor | Ahmed Khudhair | (Iraq) |

== Honours ==
=== Major ===
| Type | Competition | Titles | Seasons |
|---|---|---|---|
| Domestic (national) | Iraq Stars League | 8 | 1974–75, 1989–90, 1991–92, 1996–97, 2004–05, 2016–17, 2020–21, 2025–26 |
| Domestic (national) | Iraqi National First Division | 1 | 1973–74 |
| Domestic (national) | Iraq FA Cup | 6 | 1977–78, 1991–92, 1996–97, 2015–16, 2020–21, 2022–23 |
| Domestic (national) | Iraqi Super Cup | 2 | 1997, 2001 |
| Domestic (national) | Baghdad Championship | 3^{s} | 1994–95, 1996–97, 1998–99 |
| Domestic (regional) | Iraq Central FA Premier League | 4 | 1957–58, 1961–62, 1963–64, 1972–73 |
| Domestic (regional) | Iraq FA Baghdad Cup | 1 | 1974 |
| Domestic (regional) | Iraq Central FA Perseverance Cup | 2^{s} | 1962, 1964 |
| Continental | AFC Cup / AFC Champions League Two | 3^{s} | 2016, 2017, 2018 |

- record
- ^{S} shared record

=== Minor ===
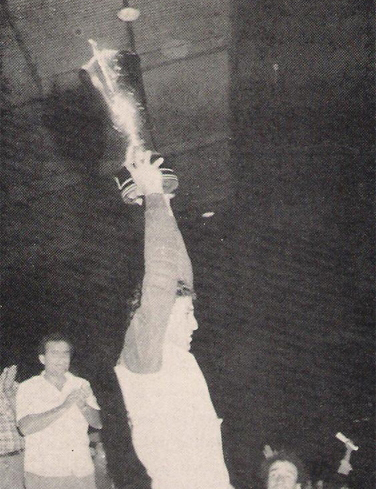
Kadhim Shabib lifts the 1984 Al-Wehdat Championship trophy, won by Al-Tayaran.

| Competition | Titles | Seasons |
|---|---|---|
| New Iraq Championship | 1 | 2003 |
| Al-Quds International Championship | 1 | 2001 |
| Victory Championship | 1 | 1988 |
| Farewell League Trophy | 1 | 1986 |
| Al-Milad Cup | 1 | 1985 |
| Al-Wehdat Championship | 1 | 1984 |
| Stafford Challenge Cup | 1 | 1982 |
| Army League | 1 | 1973–74 |
| Army Cup | 4^{s} | 1958, 1959, 1964, 1973 |
| Authority Director Cup | 1 | 1964 |
| Al-Firqa Al-Thaniya Cup | 1 | 1961 |
| Inter-Forces Tournament | 1 | 1957 |
| Wajih Younis Cup | 1 | 1956 |
| Jamal Baban Cup | 1 | 1950 |
| Al-Quwa Al-Jawiya Cup | 2 | 1941, 1942 |
| Palestine Cup | 1 | 1942 |
| Capital Secretariat Cup | 1 | 1941 |
| Guardian Cup | 1 | 1940 |
| Taha Al-Hashimi Cup | 1 | 1939 |
| Casuals Cup | 4 | 1932–33, 1933–34, 1934–35, 1935–36 |
| Prince Ghazi Cup | 3 | 1932–33, 1933–34, 1934–35 |

- record
- ^{S} shared record

== Statistics ==
=== In domestic competitions ===
==== Regional ====
| Year | Central League | Baghdad Cup | Perseverance Cup |
|---|---|---|---|
| 1956–57 | Runner-up | Started in 1974 | Started in 1962 |
| 1957–58 | Winner | Started in 1974 | Started in 1962 |
| 1958–59 | Ninth place | Started in 1974 | Started in 1962 |
| 1959–60 | Runner-up | Started in 1974 | Started in 1962 |
| 1960–61 | Third place | Started in 1974 | Started in 1962 |
| 1961–62 | Winner | Started in 1974 | Winner |
| 1962–63 | Fourth place | Started in 1974 | did not qualify |
| 1963–64 | Winner | Started in 1974 | Winner |
| 1964–65 | Fifth place | Started in 1974 | did not qualify |
| 1965–66 | Runner-up | Started in 1974 | Runner-up |
| 1966–67 | not finished | Started in 1974 | Abolished in 1966 |
| 1967–68 | Third place | Started in 1974 | Abolished in 1966 |
| 1968–69 | Runner-up | Started in 1974 | Abolished in 1966 |
| 1969–70 | Fourth place | Started in 1974 | Abolished in 1966 |
| 1970–71 | Third place | Started in 1974 | Abolished in 1966 |
| 1971–72 | Fourth place | Started in 1974 | Abolished in 1966 |
| 1972–73 | Winner | Started in 1974 | Abolished in 1966 |
| 1973–74 | Folded in 1973 | Winner | Abolished in 1966 |

==== National ====
| Year | National First Division |
|---|---|
| 1973–74 | Winner |

| Year | Stars League | FA Cup | Super Cup | Baghdad Ch'ship |
|---|---|---|---|---|
| 1948–49 | Started in 1974 | did not enter | Started in 1986 | Started in 1991 |
| 1974–75 | Winner | not held | Started in 1986 | Started in 1991 |
| 1975–76 | Runner-up | Round of 32 | Started in 1986 | Started in 1991 |
| 1976–77 | Ninth place | not held | Started in 1986 | Started in 1991 |
| 1977–78 | Seventh place | Winner | Started in 1986 | Started in 1991 |
| 1978–79 | Fifth place | Semi-final | Started in 1986 | Started in 1991 |
| 1979–80 | Ninth place | Round of 16 | Started in 1986 | Started in 1991 |
| 1980–81 | Third place | Quarter-final | Started in 1986 | Started in 1991 |
| 1981–82 | Runner-up | Semi-final | Started in 1986 | Started in 1991 |
| 1982–83 | Third place | Semi-final | Started in 1986 | Started in 1991 |
| 1983–84 | Third place | Quarter-final | Started in 1986 | Started in 1991 |
| 1984–85 | not finished | not finished | Started in 1986 | Started in 1991 |
| 1985–86 | Third place | not held | did not qualify | Started in 1991 |
| 1986–87 | Fourth place | Semi-final | not held | Started in 1991 |
| 1987–88 | Third place | Round of 16 | not held | Started in 1991 |
| 1988–89 | Third place | Runner-up | not held | Started in 1991 |
| 1989–90 | Winner | Semi-final | not held | Started in 1991 |
| 1990–91 | Sixth place | Semi-final | not held | Started in 1991 |
| 1991–92 | Winner | Winner | not held | Runner-up |
| 1992–93 | Third place | Second round | not held | Runner-up |
| 1993–94 | Runner-up | Semi-final | not held | Runner-up |
| 1994–95 | Runner-up | Semi-final | not held | Winner |
| 1995–96 | Eighth place | Semi-final | not held | Runner-up |
| 1996–97 | Winner | Winner | Winner | Winner |
| 1997–98 | Runner-up | Runner-up | did not qualify | Group stage |
| 1998–99 | Third place | Semi-final | not held | Winner |
| 1999–2000 | Runner-up | Runner-up | did not qualify | Runner-up |
| 2000–01 | Runner-up | not held | Runner-up | Group stage |
| 2001–02 | Runner-up | Round of 16 | Winner | Fourth place |
| 2002–03 | not finished | Round of 32 | Runner-up | Fourth place |
| 2003–04 | not finished | not held | not held | Semi-final |
| 2004–05 | Winner | not held | not held | Abolished in 2004 |
| 2005–06 | Fourth place | not held | not held | Abolished in 2004 |
| 2006–07 | Runner-up | not held | not held | Abolished in 2004 |
| 2007–08 | Third place | not held | not held | Abolished in 2004 |
| 2008–09 | Sixth place | not held | not held | Abolished in 2004 |
| 2009–10 | Fifth place | not held | not held | Abolished in 2004 |
| 2010–11 | Fourth place | not held | not held | Abolished in 2004 |
| 2011–12 | Third place | not held | not held | Abolished in 2004 |
| 2012–13 | Third place | not finished | not held | Abolished in 2004 |
| 2013–14 | Fourth place | not held | not held | Abolished in 2004 |
| 2014–15 | Runner-up | not held | not held | Abolished in 2004 |
| 2015–16 | Fourth place | Winner | not held | Abolished in 2004 |
| 2016–17 | Winner | Quarter-final | not held | Abolished in 2004 |
| 2017–18 | Runner-up | not held | Runner-up | Abolished in 2004 |
| 2018–19 | Runner-up | Semi-final | not held | Abolished in 2004 |
| 2019–20 | not finished | not finished | did not qualify | Abolished in 2004 |
| 2020–21 | Winner | Winner | not held | Abolished in 2004 |
| 2021–22 | Runner-up | Quarter-final | Runner-up | Abolished in 2004 |
| 2022–23 | Runner-up | Winner | did not qualify | Abolished in 2004 |
| 2023–24 | Runner-up | Runner-up | not held | Abolished in 2004 |
| 2024–25 | Fifth place | Semi-final | not held | Abolished in 2004 |
| 2025–26 | Winner | not finished | not held | Abolished in 2004 |

== Women's football ==
- Iraqi Women's Football League:
  - Champions (1): 2023–24

== Basketball ==
- Iraqi Basketball Premier League:
  - Champions (1): 1993–94

== See also ==
- Iraqi football clubs in Asian competitions
