= 1958–59 Iraq Central FA First Division Cup =

Iraq Central FA Premier League
- Season: 1958–59
- Champions: Amanat Al-Asima (1st title)

The 1958–59 Iraq Central FA First Division Cup was the 11th season of the Iraq Central FA Premier League (the top division of football in Baghdad and its neighbouring cities from 1948 to 1973). It was played as a double-elimination tournament.

Amanat Al-Asima won their first title by beating Al-Athori 1–0 in the final which was ended at half-time due to the withdrawal of Al-Athori's players.

== Name changes ==
- Al-Kuliya Al-Askariya Al-Malakiya renamed to Al-Kuliya Al-Askariya.
- Al-Quwa Al-Jawiya Al-Malakiya renamed to Al-Quwa Al-Jawiya.

== Final positions ==
Pos	Team	Qualification
1	Amanat Al-Asima	League Champions
2	Al-Athori	
3	Al-Sikak Al-Hadeed	
4	Al-Shorta Select XI	
5	Al-Liwa Al-Thamin	
5	Maslahat Naqil Al-Rukab	
7	Al-Adhamiya	
7	Al-Failiya	
9	Al-Quwa Al-Jawiya	
9	Al-Kuliya Al-Askariya	
9	Al-Numan	

== Upper bracket ==
=== Summary ===
Home team	Score	Away team
Upper round 1
Al-Adhamiya	4–1	Al-Failiya
Al-Sikak Al-Hadeed	0–0 (a.e.t.); 2–2 (a.e.t.) (replay); 2–0 (replay)	Al-Liwa Al-Thamin
Amanat Al-Asima	5–0	Al-Numan
Al-Athori	0–0 (a.e.t.); 2–1 (replay)	Al-Quwa Al-Jawiya
Al-Shorta Select XI	7–1	Al-Kuliya Al-Askariya
Upper intermediate round
Amanat Al-Asima	6–1	Maslahat Naqil Al-Rukab
Upper round 2 (Al-Adhamiya results not available)
Al-Sikak Al-Hadeed	3–2	Al-Shorta Select XI
Amanat Al-Asima	3–3 (a.e.t.); 2–1 (replay)	Al-Athori
Upper final
Amanat Al-Asima	4–0	Al-Sikak Al-Hadeed

=== Upper round 1 ===
26 January 1959

Al-Adhamiya	4–1	Al-Failiya

Al-Mansour Stadium, Baghdad

Al-Failiya move to the lower bracket

27 January 1959
15:15 UTC+03:00

Al-Sikak Al-Hadeed	0–0 (a.e.t.)	Al-Liwa Al-Thamin

Al-Mansour Stadium, Baghdad
2 March 1959
15:00 UTC+03:00

Al-Sikak Al-Hadeed	2–2 (a.e.t.)	Al-Liwa Al-Thamin
Thabid 25', 65'		Rahman 15'; Mohammed 30'

Al-Mansour Stadium, Baghdad
Attendance: 1,000

Al-Sikak Al-Hadeed	2–0	Al-Liwa Al-Thamin

Al-Liwa Al-Thamin move to the lower bracket

28 January 1959
15:15 UTC+03:00

Amanat Al-Asima	5–0	Al-Numan
Meslawi 15', 80'; Najim 55', 65'; Mohammed 75' (pen.)

Al-Mansour Stadium, Baghdad

Al-Numan move to the lower bracket

29 January 1959
15:15 UTC+03:00

Al-Athori	0–0 (a.e.t.)	Al-Quwa Al-Jawiya

Al-Mansour Stadium, Baghdad
8 March 1959
15:00 UTC+03:00

Al-Athori	2–1	Al-Quwa Al-Jawiya
A. Baba 50', 79'		F. Mohammed 35'

Al-Mansour Stadium, Baghdad
Attendance: 8,000

Al-Quwa Al-Jawiya move to the lower bracket

4 March 1959

Al-Shorta Select XI	7–1	Al-Kuliya Al-Askariya
Fima; Sahakian; Tabra; T. Ismail		Goal

Al-Quwa Al-Jawiya Stadium, Baghdad

Al-Kuliya Al-Askariya move to the lower bracket

=== Upper intermediate round ===
7 March 1959
15:00 UTC+03:00

Amanat Al-Asima	6–1	Maslahat Naqil Al-Rukab
Meslawi; Najim; T. Mohammed; Jeha		Salih; Hussein (red card)

Al-Mansour Stadium, Baghdad

Maslahat Naqil Al-Rukab move to the lower bracket

=== Upper round 2 ===
20 April 1959
16:00 UTC+03:00

Al-Sikak Al-Hadeed	3–2	Al-Shorta Select XI
S. Ismail 10', 70'; Thabid 65'		T. Ismail 60'; Khalaf 75' (o.g.); J. Mohammed (penalty missed)

Al-Mansour Stadium, Baghdad
Attendance: 2,000

Al-Shorta Select XI move to the lower bracket

25 April 1959
16:00 UTC+03:00

Amanat Al-Asima	3–3 (a.e.t.)	Al-Athori
Najim 25'; Salim 54'; Jeha 62'		Odisho 15'; Sarkis 30'; A. Baba 60' (pen.)

Al-Kashafa Stadium, Baghdad
Attendance: 2,000
6 May 1959
16:30 UTC+03:00

Amanat Al-Asima	2–1	Al-Athori
Meslawi 20', 60'		A. Baba 75'

Al-Kashafa Stadium, Baghdad
Attendance: 4,000

Al-Athori move to the lower bracket

Al-Adhamiya move to the lower bracket (results not available)

=== Upper final ===
1 June 1959
17:00 UTC+03:00

Amanat Al-Asima	4–0	Al-Sikak Al-Hadeed
Jeha 1'; Najim 30'; Meslawi 55'; Salim 65'		Salman (red card) 68'

Al-Mansour Stadium, Baghdad
Attendance: 2,000

Amanat Al-Asima advance to the final
Al-Sikak Al-Hadeed move to the lower bracket

== Lower bracket ==
=== Summary ===
Home team	Score	Away team
Lower round 1 (Al-Numan results not available)
Al-Kuliya Al-Askariya	0–1 (Note: Match was ended 30 minutes early by the referee following an argument with an Al-Kuliya Al-Askariya player.)	Al-Liwa Al-Thamin
Maslahat Naqil Al-Rukab	4–1	Al-Quwa Al-Jawiya
Lower round 2 (Al-Adhamiya results not available)
Al-Shorta Select XI	8–1	Al-Failiya
Lower intermediate round
Al-Shorta Select XI	3–2 (a.e.t.)	Maslahat Naqil Al-Rukab
Al-Shorta Select XI	1–1 (a.e.t.); 4–0 (replay)	Al-Liwa Al-Thamin
Lower round 3
Al-Athori	4–0	Al-Shorta Select XI
Lower final
Al-Athori	2–1 (a.e.t.)	Al-Sikak Al-Hadeed

=== Lower round 1 ===
18 April 1959
16:00 UTC+03:00

Al-Kuliya Al-Askariya	0–1	Al-Liwa Al-Thamin
		Masoud

Muaskar Al-Rasheed Stadium, Baghdad

The match was ended 30 minutes early after the referee refused to continue officiating the game following an argument with Al-Kuliya Al-Askariya player Abed Razzoki
Al-Kuliya Al-Askariya eliminated

19 April 1959
16:00 UTC+03:00

Maslahat Naqil Al-Rukab	4–1	Al-Quwa Al-Jawiya
K. Gorgis; Abdul-Majid		Eshaya

Al-Mansour Stadium, Baghdad
Attendance: 2,000

Al-Quwa Al-Jawiya eliminated

Al-Numan eliminated (results not available)

=== Lower round 2 ===
30 April 1959

Al-Shorta Select XI	8–1	Al-Failiya
T. Ismail 25', 40'; Lateef 48'; Tabra 53', 61'; Abu Al-Awra 75', 79', 85'		Hussein 43' (o.g.)

Al-Shorta Stadium, Baghdad

Al-Failiya eliminated

Al-Adhamiya eliminated (results not available)

=== Lower intermediate round ===
8 May 1959
16:30 UTC+03:00

Al-Shorta Select XI	3–2 (a.e.t.)	Maslahat Naqil Al-Rukab
Sahakian 55'; T. Ismail 80', 97'; Hussein (red card)		E. Gorgis 25'; K. Gorgis 85'; H. Gorgis (penalty missed); Y. Gorgis (red card)

Al-Kashafa Stadium, Baghdad
Attendance: 4,000
Referee: Hamid Khadir

Maslahat Naqil Al-Rukab eliminated

25 May 1959

Al-Shorta Select XI	1–1 (a.e.t.)	Al-Liwa Al-Thamin

27 May 1959
16:30 UTC+03:00

Al-Shorta Select XI	4–0	Al-Liwa Al-Thamin
T. Ismail 30', 90'; J. Mohammed 40'; Tabra 55'

Al-Mansour Stadium, Baghdad
Attendance: 1,000

Al-Liwa Al-Thamin eliminated

=== Lower round 3 ===
31 May 1959

Al-Athori	4–0	Al-Shorta Select XI
Enwiyah 9'; Sarkis 60'; Odisho 65', 85' (pen.)

Al-Mansour Stadium, Baghdad
Attendance: 3,000

Al-Shorta Select XI eliminated

=== Lower final ===
11 June 1959
17:00 UTC+03:00

Al-Athori	2–1 (a.e.t.)	Al-Sikak Al-Hadeed
Odisho 19'; G. Ismail		Thabid 30'

Al-Mansour Stadium, Baghdad

Al-Athori advance to the final
Al-Sikak Al-Hadeed eliminated

== Final ==
The match was ended at half-time after Al-Athori players left the field in the 40th minute following the referee's decision to award Amanat Al-Asima a penalty, which they subsequently kicked into an empty net. Al-Athori players claimed that they had left the field due to the referee's refusal to deal with the behaviour of Amanat Al-Asima's fans rather than due to his awarding of a penalty kick. Al-Athori's captain Sarkis Shamson was suspended for six months following the incident, while forward Ammo Baba and goalkeeper Yacoub Yousef were given warnings and the club's sports secretary Youil George Baba was suspended for one year.

21 June 1959

Amanat Al-Asima	1–0	Al-Athori
T. Mohammed 40' (pen.)

Al-Mansour Stadium, Baghdad
Attendance: 5,000

Iraq Central FA First Division Cup
1958–59 winner
Amanat Al-Asima
1st title
