= 1959–60 Iraq Central FA First Division Cup =

Iraq Central FA Premier League
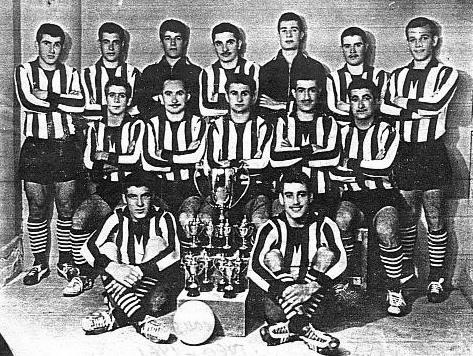
- Season: 1959–60
- Champions: Al-Athori (1st title)
- Relegated: Al-Adhamiya

The 1959–60 Iraq Central FA First Division Cup was the 12th season of the Iraq Central FA Premier League (the top division of football in Baghdad and its neighbouring cities from 1948 to 1973). It was played as a double-elimination tournament. Al-Athori beat Al-Quwa Al-Jawiya 3–0 in the final on 6 May 1960 to win their first title.

== Final positions ==
Pos	Team	Qualification or relegation
1	Al-Athori	League Champions
2	Al-Quwa Al-Jawiya	
3	Al-Shorta Select XI	
4	Amanat Al-Asima	
5	Al-Ghazl wal-Naseej	Relocated to Mosul
6	Al-Sikak Al-Hadeed	
7	Al-Liwa Al-Thamin	Relocated to Baquba
8	Maslahat Naqil Al-Rukab	
8	Al-Numan	
10	Al-Kuliya Al-Askariya	
11	Al-Failiya	
12	Al-Adhamiya	Relegated to Iraq Central FA Second Division Cup

== Upper bracket ==
=== Summary ===
Home team	Score	Away team
Upper round 1
Al-Sikak Al-Hadeed	4–1	Al-Liwa Al-Thamin
Al-Athori	2–1	Al-Ghazl wal-Naseej
Al-Quwa Al-Jawiya	3–1	Al-Failiya
Maslahat Naqil Al-Rukab	3–0	Al-Kuliya Al-Askariya
Amanat Al-Asima	2–0	Al-Shorta Select XI
Al-Adhamiya	L–W	Al-Numan
Upper round 2
Al-Quwa Al-Jawiya	2–1	Maslahat Naqil Al-Rukab
Al-Athori	7–0	Al-Numan
Upper intermediate round
Al-Quwa Al-Jawiya	3–1 (Note: Match was ended five minutes early due to the withdrawal of two Amanat Al-Asima players.)	Amanat Al-Asima
Al-Athori	2–0	Al-Sikak Al-Hadeed
Upper final
Al-Quwa Al-Jawiya	0–0 (a.e.t.); 4–3 (replay)	Al-Athori

=== Upper round 1 ===
22 December 1959
15:00 UTC+03:00

Al-Sikak Al-Hadeed	4–1	Al-Liwa Al-Thamin

25th Liwa Stadium, Baghdad

Al-Liwa Al-Thamin move to the lower bracket

23 December 1959
15:00 UTC+03:00

Al-Athori	2–1	Al-Ghazl wal-Naseej

25th Liwa Stadium, Baghdad

Al-Ghazl wal-Naseej move to the lower bracket

24 December 1959
15:00 UTC+03:00

Al-Quwa Al-Jawiya	3–1	Al-Failiya

25th Liwa Stadium, Baghdad

Al-Failiya move to the lower bracket

December 1959

Maslahat Naqil Al-Rukab	3–0	Al-Kuliya Al-Askariya

Al-Kuliya Al-Askariya move to the lower bracket

December 1959

Amanat Al-Asima	2–0	Al-Shorta Select XI

Al-Shorta Select XI move to the lower bracket

December 1959

Al-Adhamiya	L–W	Al-Numan

Al-Adhamiya move to the lower bracket

=== Upper round 2 ===
8 January 1960

Al-Quwa Al-Jawiya	2–1	Maslahat Naqil Al-Rukab
David; F. Mohammed		Majeed

Al-Kashafa Stadium, Baghdad
Attendance: 5,000

Maslahat Naqil Al-Rukab move to the lower bracket

11 January 1960

Al-Athori	7–0	Al-Numan
Gorgis; Odisho; Baba; Khoshaba

25th Liwa Stadium, Baghdad
Referee: Fahmi Al-Qaimaqchi

Al-Numan move to the lower bracket

=== Upper intermediate round ===
15 January 1960
15:00 UTC+03:00

Al-Quwa Al-Jawiya	3–1	Amanat Al-Asima
F. Mohammed 15', 65'; T. Mohammed 85'		Jeha 25'

Al-Kashafa Stadium, Baghdad
Referee: Salih Faraj

The match was ended five minutes early after two Amanat Al-Asima players walked off the field in protest at a refereeing decision
Amanat Al-Asima move to the lower bracket

22 January 1960
15:00 UTC+03:00

Al-Athori	2–0	Al-Sikak Al-Hadeed
Baba (penalty missed) 48', 51'; Gorgis 56'

Al-Kashafa Stadium, Baghdad
Referee: Salih Faraj

Al-Sikak Al-Hadeed move to the lower bracket

=== Upper final ===
22 March 1960
15:30 UTC+03:00

Al-Quwa Al-Jawiya	0–0 (a.e.t.)	Al-Athori

Al-Kashafa Stadium, Baghdad
10 April 1960
16:00 UTC+03:00

Al-Quwa Al-Jawiya	4–3	Al-Athori
Shamshon 7' (o.g.); F. Mohammed 14', 86'; Ibrahim 56'		G. Ismail 30', 70'; Putros 83'

Al-Kashafa Stadium, Baghdad
Referee: Fahmi Al-Qaimaqchi

Al-Quwa Al-Jawiya advance to the final
Al-Athori move to the lower bracket

== Lower bracket ==
=== Summary ===
Home team	Score	Away team
Lower round 1
Al-Failiya	L–W	Al-Kuliya Al-Askariya
Al-Ghazl wal-Naseej	11–0	Al-Adhamiya
Al-Liwa Al-Thamin	4–2	Al-Numan
Al-Shorta Select XI	1–1 (a.e.t.); 1–0 (replay)	Maslahat Naqil Al-Rukab
Lower round 2
Al-Ghazl wal-Naseej	4–0	Al-Kuliya Al-Askariya
Al-Shorta Select XI	3–2	Al-Liwa Al-Thamin
Amanat Al-Asima	4–1	Al-Sikak Al-Hadeed
Lower intermediate round
Al-Shorta Select XI	2–1	Al-Ghazl wal-Naseej
Lower round 3
Al-Shorta Select XI	3–0	Amanat Al-Asima
Lower final
Al-Athori	2–1	Al-Shorta Select XI

=== Lower round 1 ===
6 January 1960
15:00 UTC+03:00

Al-Failiya	L–W	Al-Kuliya Al-Askariya

25th Liwa Stadium, Baghdad
Referee: Sayid Farouq

Al-Failiya eliminated

11 January 1960

Al-Ghazl wal-Naseej	11–0	Al-Adhamiya
Mahdi 25', 27', 34', 65', 70'; Q. Jawad 50', 55', 75', 80'; A. Jawad 65', 70'

25th Liwa Stadium, Baghdad

Al-Adhamiya eliminated

17 January 1960

Al-Liwa Al-Thamin	4–2	Al-Numan

Al-Numan eliminated

18 January 1960
15:00 UTC+03:00

Al-Shorta Select XI	1–1 (a.e.t.)	Maslahat Naqil Al-Rukab
Abdul-Qadir 25' (o.g.)		H. Ali 70'

Al-Mansour Stadium, Baghdad
Referee: Ismail Hammoudi
24 January 1960
15:15 UTC+03:00

Al-Shorta Select XI	1–0	Maslahat Naqil Al-Rukab
Janja 30'

25th Liwa Stadium, Baghdad

Maslahat Naqil Al-Rukab eliminated

=== Lower round 2 ===
21 January 1960

Al-Ghazl wal-Naseej	4–0	Al-Kuliya Al-Askariya

Al-Kuliya Al-Askariya eliminated

27 January 1960

Al-Shorta Select XI	3–2	Al-Liwa Al-Thamin
Tabra; Sahakian; Janja		Basher; Wilson

25th Liwa Stadium, Baghdad

Al-Liwa Al-Thamin eliminated

5 February 1960
14:30 UTC+03:00

Amanat Al-Asima	4–1	Al-Sikak Al-Hadeed
Jeha 20', 83'; Najim 30'; Meslawi 70'		K. Ali 15'

Al-Kashafa Stadium, Baghdad

Al-Sikak Al-Hadeed eliminated

=== Lower intermediate round ===
5 February 1960
10:00 UTC+03:00

Al-Shorta Select XI	2–1	Al-Ghazl wal-Naseej
T. Ismail 35'; Sahakian 55'		A. Mohammed 25'

25th Liwa Stadium, Baghdad

Al-Ghazl wal-Naseej eliminated

=== Lower round 3 ===
26 February 1960
15:00 UTC+03:00

Al-Shorta Select XI	3–0	Amanat Al-Asima
Sahakian 15', 56'; Darwish 60'

Al-Kashafa Stadium, Baghdad

Amanat Al-Asima eliminated

=== Lower final ===
17 April 1960
16:00 UTC+03:00

Al-Athori	2–1	Al-Shorta Select XI
G. Ismail 8'; Putros 55'		T. Ismail 70'; Hussein (red card)

Al-Kashafa Stadium, Baghdad
Referee: Ismail Hammoudi

Al-Athori advance to the final
Al-Shorta Select XI eliminated

== Final ==
6 May 1960
16:00 UTC+03:00

Al-Quwa Al-Jawiya	0–3	Al-Athori
		Gorgis 12', 88'; G. Ismail 76'; Shawil (red card) 83'

Al-Kashafa Stadium, Baghdad
Attendance: 3,000

Iraq Central FA First Division Cup
1959–60 winner
Al-Athori
1st title

== Bracket ==
Upper round 1	Upper round 2	Upper round 3	Upper final	Final
Amanat Al-Asima	2
Al-Shorta Select XI	0
Al-Quwa Al-Jawiya	3	Amanat Al-Asima	1
Al-Failiya	1	Al-Quwa Al-Jawiya	3
Al-Quwa Al-Jawiya	2
Maslahat Naqil Al-Rukab	1
Maslahat Naqil Al-Rukab	3	Al-Quwa Al-Jawiya (replay)	0(4)
Al-Kuliya Al-Askariya	0	Al-Athori	0(3)
Al-Sikak Al-Hadeed	4
Al-Liwa Al-Thamin	1
Al-Athori	2	Al-Sikak Al-Hadeed	0
Al-Ghazl wal-Naseej	1	Al-Athori	2
Al-Athori	7
Al-Numan	0
Al-Adhamiya	L	Al-Quwa Al-Jawiya	0
Al-Numan	W	Al-Athori	3
Lower round 1	Lower round 2	Lower round 3	Lower round 4	Lower final
Al-Shorta Select XI (replay)	1(1)	Amanat Al-Asima	4
Maslahat Naqil Al-Rukab	1(0)	Al-Sikak Al-Hadeed	1
Al-Shorta Select XI	3	Al-Athori	2
Al-Liwa Al-Thamin	2	Amanat Al-Asima	0	Al-Shorta Select XI	1
Al-Liwa Al-Thamin	4
Al-Shorta Select XI	3
Al-Numan	2
Al-Shorta Select XI	2
Al-Ghazl wal-Naseej	1
Al-Ghazl wal-Naseej	11
Al-Adhamiya	0
Al-Ghazl wal-Naseej	4
Al-Kuliya Al-Askariya	0
Al-Failiya	L
Al-Kuliya Al-Askariya	W
