= List of Iraqi Assyrians =

This is a list of notable Iraqi Assyrians (i.e., Assyrians still residing in the country of Iraq, and those in the Assyrian diaspora who are of Iraqi-Assyrian heritage).

== List ==
=== Arts ===
- Hanna Petros
- Alfred Rasho

=== Business ===
- Nadhmi Auchi

=== Literature ===
- Sargon Boulus
- Dunya Mikhail
- Samuel Shimon

=== Politics ===
- Yusuf Salman Yusuf
- Yonadam Kanna
- Tariq Aziz
- Gurgis Shlaymun
- Pascal Esho Warda

=== Religion ===
- Eliya Abuna
- Gewargis III
- Raphael I Bidawid
- Eliya Abulyonan
- Ignatius Aphrem I Barsoum
- Ragheed Ganni
- George Garmo
- Timothaus Shallita
- Yohannan VIII Hormizd
- Louis Raphael I Sako

=== Sports ===
- Ammo Baba
- Douglas Aziz
- Youra Eshaya
- Ayoub Odisho
- Basil Gorgis
- Saad Benyamin
- Justin Meram
- Rebin Sulaka
- Mario Shabow
- Saadi Toma
- Thamer Yousif
- Aram Karam
- Saeed Easho
- Edison David

=== Others ===
- Hormuzd Rassam
- Donny George Youkhanna
- Alphonse Mingana
- Toma Tomas
- Margaret George Shello
- Kamel Hana Gegeo
