= 1957–58 Iraq Central FA First Division Cup =

Iraq Central FA Premier League
- Season: 1957–58
- Champions: Al-Quwa Al-Jawiya Al-Malakiya (1st title)
- Top goalscorer: Ammo Baba; Qasim Mahmoud (5 goals each)

The 1957–58 Iraq Central FA First Division Cup was the 10th season of the Iraq Central FA Premier League (the top division of football in Baghdad and its neighbouring cities from 1948 to 1973). It was played as a double-elimination tournament and started on 26 November 1957.

Al-Quwa Al-Jawiya Al-Malakiya (now known as Al-Quwa Al-Jawiya) won their first title, after Al-Shorta Select XI withdrew from the replay of the final due to missing several players from their squad through injury with the Iraq Central Football Association refusing to move the game to another date. Al-Quwa Al-Jawiya Al-Malakiya's Edison David was the player of the tournament.

== Final positions ==
Pos	Team	Qualification
1	Al-Quwa Al-Jawiya Al-Malakiya	League Champions
2	Al-Shorta Select XI	
3	Maslahat Naqil Al-Rukab	
4	Al-Numan	
5	Al-Adhamiya	
6	Al-Athori	
7	Al-Liwa Al-Thamin	
8	Al-Kuliya Al-Askariya Al-Malakiya	

== Upper bracket ==
=== Summary ===
Home team	Score	Away team
Upper round 1
Al-Kuliya Al-Askariya Al-Malakiya	0–3	Al-Quwa Al-Jawiya Al-Malakiya
Al-Adhamiya	3–2	Al-Athori
Al-Numan	2–1	Al-Liwa Al-Thamin
Maslahat Naqil Al-Rukab	2–0	Al-Shorta Select XI
Upper round 2
Maslahat Naqil Al-Rukab	3–0	Al-Numan
Al-Quwa Al-Jawiya Al-Malakiya	3–1	Al-Adhamiya
Upper final
Al-Quwa Al-Jawiya Al-Malakiya	5–2	Maslahat Naqil Al-Rukab

=== Upper round 1 ===
26 November 1957

Al-Kuliya Al-Askariya Al-Malakiya	0–3	Al-Quwa Al-Jawiya Al-Malakiya
		Eshaya 5'; Baba 50', 75'

Al-Kuliya Al-Askariya Al-Malakiya Stadium, Baghdad
Attendance: 7,000
Referee: Fahmi Al-Qaimaqchi

Al-Kuliya Al-Askariya Al-Malakiya move to the lower bracket

29 November 1957

Al-Adhamiya	3–2	Al-Athori
Jaber; Abdul-Razzaq; Naji		Wilson; William

Al-Shorta Stadium, Baghdad

Al-Athori move to the lower bracket

2 January 1958

Al-Numan	2–1	Al-Liwa Al-Thamin
Natiq 65'; Qais 87'		Ava 43'

Al-Shorta Stadium, Baghdad

Al-Liwa Al-Thamin move to the lower bracket

10 January 1958

Maslahat Naqil Al-Rukab	2–0	Al-Shorta Select XI
Gorgis 27'; Mahmoud 73'

Al-Kashafa Stadium, Baghdad

Al-Shorta Select XI move to the lower bracket

=== Upper round 2 ===
9 February 1958

Maslahat Naqil Al-Rukab	3–0	Al-Numan
Dowaff 66'; Gorgis 80'; Mahmoud 83'

Al-Kashafa Stadium, Baghdad

Al-Numan move to the lower bracket

6 March 1958
15:30 UTC+03:00

Al-Quwa Al-Jawiya Al-Malakiya	3–1	Al-Adhamiya
Hammadi; Eshaya 70', 80'		Naji 35' (pen.)

Al-Mansour Stadium, Baghdad
Attendance: 6,000
Referee: Fahmi Al-Qaimaqchi

Al-Adhamiya move to the lower bracket

=== Upper final ===
30 March 1958

Al-Quwa Al-Jawiya Al-Malakiya	5–2	Maslahat Naqil Al-Rukab
Simsim; Baba; Mohammed		Mahmoud

Attendance: 12,000
Referee: Fahmi Al-Qaimaqchi

Al-Quwa Al-Jawiya Al-Malakiya advance to the final
Maslahat Naqil Al-Rukab move to the lower bracket

== Lower bracket ==
=== Summary ===
Home team	Score	Away team
Lower round 1
Al-Athori	3–0	Al-Kuliya Al-Askariya Al-Malakiya
Al-Shorta Select XI	3–1	Al-Liwa Al-Thamin
Lower round 2
Al-Shorta Select XI	2–0	Al-Athori
Al-Numan	3–0	Al-Adhamiya
Lower round 3
Al-Shorta Select XI	1–0 (Note: Match was ended at the beginning of the second half due to the withdrawal of Al-Numan's players.)	Al-Numan
Lower final
Al-Shorta Select XI	3–2	Maslahat Naqil Al-Rukab

=== Lower round 1 ===
15 January 1958

Al-Athori	3–0	Al-Kuliya Al-Askariya Al-Malakiya
Awisha 10', 40'; Sarkis 20'

Al-Shorta Stadium, Baghdad
Attendance: 4,000

Al-Kuliya Al-Askariya Al-Malakiya eliminated

7 February 1958

Al-Shorta Select XI	3–1	Al-Liwa Al-Thamin
Sahakian 55' Janja 85'		25'

Al-Liwa Al-Thamin eliminated

=== Lower round 2 ===
14 February 1958

Al-Shorta Select XI	2–0	Al-Athori
Waleed 70'; Sahakian 75'

Al-Kashafa Stadium, Baghdad
Attendance: 10,000

Al-Athori eliminated

14 March 1958

Al-Numan	3–0	Al-Adhamiya
Qais; Anad

Referee: Moayad Al-Badri

Al-Adhamiya eliminated

=== Lower round 3 ===
27 March 1958

Al-Shorta Select XI	1–0	Al-Numan
Janja

Referee: Hama Peshka

The match was ended at the beginning of the second half after Al-Numan withdrew in protest at the goal being awarded
Al-Numan eliminated

=== Lower final ===
10 April 1958

Al-Shorta Select XI	3–2	Maslahat Naqil Al-Rukab
Lateef 20', 60'; Fima 53'		Mahmoud 70'; Gorgis 72'

Al-Kashafa Stadium, Baghdad
Attendance: 7,000
Referee: Ismail Hammoudi

Al-Shorta Select XI advance to the final
Maslahat Naqil Al-Rukab eliminated

== Final ==
1 May 1958

Al-Quwa Al-Jawiya Al-Malakiya	1–1 (a.e.t.)	Al-Shorta Select XI
Mohammed		Sahakian

Al-Kashafa Stadium, Baghdad
Referee: Ismail Hammoudi

Al-Shorta Select XI withdrew from the replay of the final due to several key players from their squad being unavailable through injury. The Iraq Central Football Association, refusing to move the game to another date, therefore awarded Al-Quwa Al-Jawiya Al-Malakiya a walkover victory and the title.

12 May 1958
16:30 UTC+03:00

Al-Quwa Al-Jawiya Al-Malakiya	w/o from	Al-Shorta Select XI

Al-Kashafa Stadium, Baghdad

Iraq Central FA First Division Cup
1957–58 winner
Al-Quwa Al-Jawiya Al-Malakiya
1st title

== Bracket ==
Upper round 1	Upper round 2	Upper final	Final
Al-Kuliya Al-Askariya Al-Malakiya	0
Al-Quwa Al-Jawiya Al-Malakiya	3
Al-Quwa Al-Jawiya Al-Malakiya	3
Al-Adhamiya	1
Al-Adhamiya	3
Al-Athori	2
Al-Quwa Al-Jawiya Al-Malakiya	5
Maslahat Naqil Al-Rukab	2
Al-Numan	2
Al-Liwa Al-Thamin	1
Al-Numan	0
Maslahat Naqil Al-Rukab	3
Maslahat Naqil Al-Rukab	2
Al-Shorta Select XI	0	Al-Quwa Al-Jawiya Al-Malakiya	1	awd
Al-Shorta Select XI	1
Lower round 1	Lower round 2	Lower round 3	Lower final
Al-Adhamiya	0
Al-Numan	3	Maslahat Naqil Al-Rukab	2
Al-Numan	0	Al-Shorta Select XI	3
Al-Kuliya Al-Askariya Al-Malakiya	0
Al-Shorta Select XI	1
Al-Athori	3
Al-Athori	0
Al-Shorta Select XI	2
Al-Liwa Al-Thamin	1
Al-Shorta Select XI	3
