= 1960–61 Iraq Central FA First Division Cup =

Iraq Central FA Premier League
- Season: 1960–61
- Champions: Maslahat Naqil Al-Rukab (2nd title)
- Relegated: Al-Failiya; Al-Numan; Al-Athori

The 1960–61 Iraq Central FA First Division Cup was the 13th season of the Iraq Central FA Premier League (the top division of football in Baghdad and its neighbouring cities from 1948 to 1973). It was played as a double-elimination tournament. Maslahat Naqil Al-Rukab won their second title by beating Al-Shorta Select XI 1–0 in the final.

== Final positions ==
Pos	Team	Qualification or relegation
1	Maslahat Naqil Al-Rukab	League Champions
2	Al-Shorta Select XI	
3	Al-Quwa Al-Jawiya	
4	Al-Sikak Al-Hadeed	
5	Al-Kuliya Al-Askariya	
5	Amanat Al-Asima	
7	Isalat Al-Mai	
8	Al-Failiya	Relegated to Iraq Central FA Second Division Cup
8	Al-Numan	Relegated to Iraq Central FA Second Division Cup
8	Al-Athori	Relegated to Iraq Central FA Second Division Cup

== Upper bracket ==
=== Summary ===
Home team	Score	Away team
Upper round 1
Al-Sikak Al-Hadeed	5–0	Al-Athori
Al-Shorta Select XI	1–0	Al-Numan
Al-Kuliya Al-Askariya	5–1	Amanat Al-Asima
Maslahat Naqil Al-Rukab	4–4 (a.e.t.); 3–2 (a.e.t.) (replay)	Al-Quwa Al-Jawiya
Upper intermediate round
Al-Sikak Al-Hadeed	2–2 (a.e.t.); 2–0 (replay)	Al-Failiya
Al-Kuliya Al-Askariya	2–1	Isalat Al-Mai
Upper round 2
Maslahat Naqil Al-Rukab	1–0	Al-Sikak Al-Hadeed
Al-Shorta Select XI	4–1	Al-Kuliya Al-Askariya
Upper final
Al-Shorta Select XI	3–1	Maslahat Naqil Al-Rukab

=== Upper round 1 ===
24 February 1961
15:00 UTC+03:00

Al-Sikak Al-Hadeed	5–0	Al-Athori
Ismail 10', 70'; Elias 41'; Pawlis 66'; Dawood 88'

Al-Kashafa Stadium, Baghdad
Referee: Salih Faraj

Al-Athori move to the lower bracket

27 February 1961
15:00 UTC+03:00

Al-Shorta Select XI	1–0	Al-Numan
Sahakian 50'

Al-Kashafa Stadium, Baghdad
Referee: Ghani Askar

Al-Numan move to the lower bracket

5 March 1961
15:00 UTC+03:00

Al-Kuliya Al-Askariya	5–1	Amanat Al-Asima

Al-Kashafa Stadium, Baghdad
Referee: Fahmi Al-Qaimaqchi

Amanat Al-Asima move to the lower bracket

16 March 1961

Maslahat Naqil Al-Rukab	4–4 (a.e.t.)	Al-Quwa Al-Jawiya
Abdul-Majid 10', 20' (ET); Alwan 65'		Baba 7', 15' (ET); Hashim 55'

Al-Kashafa Stadium, Baghdad
21 April 1961

Maslahat Naqil Al-Rukab	3–2 (a.e.t.)	Al-Quwa Al-Jawiya
Najim 65'; Abdul-Majid 73', 115'		Hashim 50', 70'

Al-Mansour Stadium, Baghdad
Attendance: 3,000
Referee: Ismail Hammoudi

Al-Quwa Al-Jawiya move to the lower bracket

=== Upper intermediate round ===
3 March 1961
15:00 UTC+03:00

Al-Sikak Al-Hadeed	2–2 (a.e.t.)	Al-Failiya
Dawood 14'; Ismail 28'		S. Mahmoud 30', 70'

Al-Kashafa Stadium, Baghdad
Referee: Ismail Hammoudi
27 March 1961

Al-Sikak Al-Hadeed	2–0	Al-Failiya
Ismail 15', 25'

Al-Kashafa Stadium, Baghdad

Al-Failiya move to the lower bracket

30 April 1961
16:00 UTC+03:00

Al-Kuliya Al-Askariya	2–1	Isalat Al-Mai
Hassan 35'; 70'		40' (pen.)

Al-Kashafa Stadium, Baghdad
Attendance: 2,000
Referee: Salih Faraj

Isalat Al-Mai move to the lower bracket

=== Upper round 2 ===
7 May 1961
16:00 UTC+03:00

Maslahat Naqil Al-Rukab	1–0	Al-Sikak Al-Hadeed

Al-Kashafa Stadium, Baghdad
Referee: Salih Faraj

Al-Sikak Al-Hadeed move to the lower bracket

10 May 1961
16:00 UTC+03:00

Al-Shorta Select XI	4–1	Al-Kuliya Al-Askariya
Sahakian 2'; J. Ohanisian 35'; S. Ohanisian 65'; Tabra		Salim 87'

Al-Kashafa Stadium, Baghdad
Attendance: 2,000
Referee: Ismail Hammoudi

Al-Kuliya Al-Askariya move to the lower bracket

=== Upper final ===
23 May 1961
16:45 UTC+03:00

Al-Shorta Select XI	3–1	Maslahat Naqil Al-Rukab
Sahakian		Abdul-Majid

Al-Mansour Stadium, Baghdad
Attendance: 2,500
Referee: Salih Faraj

Al-Shorta Select XI advance to the final
Maslahat Naqil Al-Rukab move to the lower bracket

== Lower bracket ==
=== Summary ===
Home team	Score	Away team
Lower round 1
Amanat Al-Asima	W–L	Al-Athori
Al-Quwa Al-Jawiya	4–2	Al-Failiya
Isalat Al-Mai	6–2	Al-Numan
Lower intermediate round
Al-Quwa Al-Jawiya	w/o (Note: The original result was a 3–2 win for Isalat Al-Mai, but Al-Quwa Al-Jawiya were later awarded a walkover victory due to Isalat Al-Mai using an ineligible player.)	Isalat Al-Mai
Lower round 2
Al-Quwa Al-Jawiya	5–0	Amanat Al-Asima
Al-Sikak Al-Hadeed	6–1	Al-Kuliya Al-Askariya
Lower round 3
Al-Quwa Al-Jawiya	3–2	Al-Sikak Al-Hadeed
Lower final
Maslahat Naqil Al-Rukab	1–1 (a.e.t.); 1–0 (replay)	Al-Quwa Al-Jawiya

=== Lower round 1 ===
26 April 1961
16:00 UTC+03:00

Amanat Al-Asima	W–L	Al-Athori

Al-Kashafa Stadium, Baghdad
Referee: Ghani Askar

Al-Athori eliminated

1 May 1961

Al-Quwa Al-Jawiya	4–2	Al-Failiya

Al-Kashafa Stadium, Baghdad
Referee: Salih Faraj

Al-Failiya eliminated

6 May 1961

Isalat Al-Mai	6–2	Al-Numan

Al-Kashafa Stadium, Baghdad

Al-Numan eliminated

=== Lower intermediate round ===
9 May 1961

Al-Quwa Al-Jawiya	w/o from	Isalat Al-Mai
Baba 75'; 80'		M. Mahmoud 15', 65'; Karim 35'

Al-Kashafa Stadium, Baghdad
Referee: Fahmi Al-Qaimaqchi

The match originally ended as a 3–2 win for Isalat Al-Mai but was later awarded as a win for Al-Quwa Al-Jawiya due to Isalat Al-Mai fielding the ineligible player Salim Hassan
Isalat Al-Mai eliminated

=== Lower round 2 ===
18 May 1961

Al-Quwa Al-Jawiya	5–0	Amanat Al-Asima

Al-Kashafa Stadium, Baghdad
Attendance: 1,500
Referee: Ghani Askar

Amanat Al-Asima eliminated

20 May 1961

Al-Sikak Al-Hadeed	6–1	Al-Kuliya Al-Askariya

Al-Kashafa Stadium, Baghdad

Al-Kuliya Al-Askariya eliminated

=== Lower round 3 ===
31 May 1961

Al-Quwa Al-Jawiya	3–2	Al-Sikak Al-Hadeed

Attendance: 4,000

Al-Sikak Al-Hadeed eliminated

=== Lower final ===
5 June 1961
17:00 UTC+03:00

Maslahat Naqil Al-Rukab	1–1 (a.e.t.)	Al-Quwa Al-Jawiya

Al-Kashafa Stadium, Baghdad
Attendance: 4,500
Referee: Ismail Hammoudi
9 June 1961

Maslahat Naqil Al-Rukab	1–0	Al-Quwa Al-Jawiya
Abdul-Majid 85' (pen.)

Al-Kashafa Stadium, Baghdad
Attendance: 5,000

Maslahat Naqil Al-Rukab advance to the final
Al-Quwa Al-Jawiya eliminated

== Final ==
13 June 1961

Al-Shorta Select XI	0–1	Maslahat Naqil Al-Rukab
		Najim 53'

Al-Kashafa Stadium, Baghdad
Attendance: 5,000

Iraq Central FA First Division Cup
1960–61 winner
Maslahat Naqil Al-Rukab
2nd title

== Bracket ==
Upper Round 1	Upper Round 2	Upper Round 3	Upper Final	Final
Al-Kuliya Al-Askariya	2
Al-Kuliya Al-Askariya	5	Isalat Al-Mai	1
Al-Kuliya Al-Askariya	1
Amanat Al-Asima	1
Al-Shorta Select XI	4
Al-Shorta Select XI	1
Al-Numan	0
Al-Shorta Select XI	3
Maslahat Naqil Al-Rukab	1
Al-Sikak Al-Hadeed (replay)	2(2)
Al-Sikak Al-Hadeed	5	Al-Failiya	2(0)
Al-Sikak Al-Hadeed	0
Al-Athori	0
Maslahat Naqil Al-Rukab	1
Maslahat Naqil Al-Rukab (replay)	4(3)
Al-Quwa Al-Jawiya	4(2)	Al-Shorta Select XI	0
Maslahat Naqil Al-Rukab	1
Lower Round 1	Lower Round 2	Lower Round 3	Lower Round 4	Lower Final
Al-Quwa Al-Jawiya	5
Al-Quwa Al-Jawiya	awd	Amanat Al-Asima	0	Maslahat Naqil Al-Rukab (replay)	1(1)
Al-Quwa Al-Jawiya	4	Isalat Al-Mai	Al-Quwa Al-Jawiya	3	Al-Quwa Al-Jawiya	1(0)
Al-Failiya	2	Al-Sikak Al-Hadeed	2
Al-Sikak Al-Hadeed	6
Amanat Al-Asima	W	Al-Kuliya Al-Askariya	1
Isalat Al-Mai	6	Al-Athori	L
Al-Numan	2
