= Al-Athori SC =

Iraqi football club

Nadi Athori
- Full name: Nadi Al-Athori Al-Riyadhi
- Founded: 11 March 1955; 70 years ago
- League: Iraqi Third Division League
Home colours

Al-Athori Sports Club or Nadi Athori (Arabic: النادي الأثوري الرياضي, lit. 'Assyrian Sports Club'), is an Iraqi football club based in Baghdad that was founded in 1955. They were the champions of the Iraq Central FA Premier League in the 1959–60 season. They were led by player-manager Ammo Baba in that season. They were relegated from the top division in 1961 and now compete in the lower divisions of Iraqi football. The club wears blue and white striped shirts. In 1974, the club was renamed to 'Al-Tamouz' but they returned to the name of Nadi Athori in 1987.

== History ==
The famous Assyrian Sports Club of Baghdad was formed in 1955 to represent the growing Assyrian population in the capital, many Assyrians had come to Baghdad from Habbaniya in the same year after control of the RAF base was handed over to Iraq from the British. The idea of a club representing the Assyrian community in Baghdad came about from three men Yonan Constantine, Elisha Baba Gorgis and Aprim Benyamin, who together on behalf of the growing Assyrian community applied for a license for the new club from the Interior Ministry under the new societies law. On 11 March 1955, Nadi Athori was founded with the first six members Ashur Nicola Kalaita, Shimson Qatcho, Youel Baba Gorgis, Yonan Constantine, Yonan Orahim, and Binyamin Yousef Gandalo, and by middle of the year the club had over a hundred members. The club's first board consisted of president Ashur Nicola Kalaita, vice-president Wilson Pera Binyamin, club secretary Binyamin Yousef Gandalo, Wasil Elisha Nimrod treasurer and Youel Baba Gorgis, a dentist as the sports secretary. The club was not only a sports club, but also a social and cultural club and had branches in other cities with large Assyrian communities in Iraq such as Kirkuk and Mosul.

During the 1950s, the club began to earn a reputation for producing young footballing talent such as Khoshaba Lawo, who was spotted by national coach Ismail Mohammed and later transferred him to one of the best teams in Iraq at the time Al-Maslaha and in 1957. Khoshaba made his international debut at the 1957 Pan Arab Games in Beirut at the age of 17, the youngest player at the Games. Other players quickly followed such as Gorgis Ismail, Albert Khoshaba and Gilbert Sami.

== Central FA Premier League Champions ==
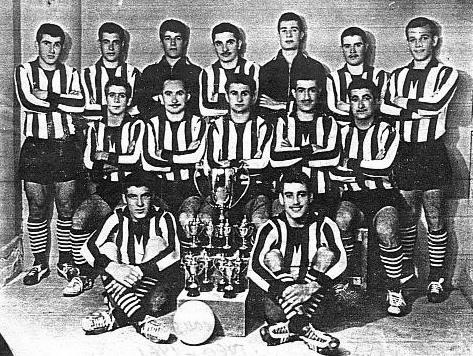
Al-Athori players with the 1959–60 Iraq Central FA First Division Cup trophy.

The first coach of the football team was Zia Shaoul, who took over in a player-coach role after the team was formed in 1955, but it was the appointment of Iraq's most famous Assyrian son Ammo Baba in 1960 that brought the club in a different direction. At the age of 24, Ammo was already an international and a regular in the Iraqi national team and had years of playing experience having represented the RAF Employees' (Assyrian) Club and C.C. Team in Habbaniya and Al-Haras Al-Malaki and Al-Quwa Al-Jawiya in Baghdad. Ammo built a strong team around national players, strikers Gorgis Ismail and Kaku Gorgis and the defender Sargis Shimshon, who Ammo had played alongside in Habbaniya and the national team. The all-Assyrian club policy meant the club's first team and reserves only fielded Assyrians in their teams and this meant that the club's coaches had to depend on a small pool of players, mainly young players, a tradition followed by Basque clubs Athletic Bilbao and Real Sociedad. The Assyrian football team's greatest achievement was to win the 1960 Iraq Central FA Premier League (then called the Iraq Central FA First Division Cup) by beating Al-Quwa Al-Jawiya a team which included the likes of Hamid Fawzi, Jalil Shihab and fellow Assyrians Youra Eshaya and Edison Eshay by an emphatic 3–0 scoreline. The 1960 Iraq Central FA Premier League squad included Wilson Shimshon, Nelson Issa, Eshaya Shalimon, William Shimshon, Wilson Daniel, Shalimon Odisho, Gorgis Ismail, Kaku Gorgis, Oshalim Yousef, William Shaoul, Daniel "Danno" Gorgis, Lawrence Butras, Ammo Baba (player-coach) and club captain Sargis Shimshon. The win brought the club's first trophy but it also its end as the club's football team was dismantled when the top players from the team moved onto rival teams in Baghdad such as Al-Quwa Al-Jawiya, Farqa Al-Thalatha and Al-Maslaha.

The club's football team in the late 70s played under the name of Al-Tamouz, and it was where the likes of Adnan Dirjal, Ayoub Odisho, Maad Ibrahim, Mudhafar Jabar, Shahin Abbas, Radhi Shenaishel and the late Adnan Al-Sheikli first began their playing careers.

== Nadi Athori vs Taj Club ==
In the 50s and 1960s, the Assyrian Sports Club played against a number of foreign teams from Syria, Lebanon and Iran. The most memorable was against the Iranian Taj Club of Tehran, who had previously played in Baghdad in 1955 against Al-Haras Al-Malaki and lost 2–0 to goals from Ammo Baba. The club would feature players from other Iraqi teams such as Ammo Baba, Aram Karam and Youra Eshaya in these friendly matches against visiting foreign teams. Non-Assyrian players such as goalkeepers Hamid Fawzi, Mohammed Thamir, Hamza Qasim, Ahsan Bahaya and Latif Shanadel, defender Jalil Shihab and right winger Abbas Hamadi guested for the Assyrian club in these international matches. On 20 May 1956, Nadi Athori went up against Taj Club of Iran at the Kashafa Stadium in front of 20,000 spectators. The team included the top Assyrian players of the era such as Ammo Baba of Al-Haras Al-Malaki, the trio goalkeeper Isaac Yacoub Isaac, Youwaresh Isaac and captain Aram Karam of Kirkuk-based Sharakat Naft Al-Iraq, the Al-Maslaha players Youel Gorgis, Hormis Goriel and the Shimshon Shallou brothers Sargis and William and Al-Quwa Al-Jawiya teammates Edison Eshay, Youra Eshaya and Ammo Simsim. The team won 5–4 with a hat-trick from team captain Aram Karam. The eventful game ended after the Iranians walked off the pitch at the protest at the awarding of a penalty only a few minutes before the end of the game. The Assyrian side which played that day was goalkeeper Ishkhaq Yacoub Ishkhaq, William Shimshon and Shimshon Gorgis, Sargis Shimshon, Hormis "Gabriel" Goriel, Youarish Ishkhaq, Youl Gorgis, Ammo Baba, Aram Karam [captain], Youra Eshaya and Emmanuel "Ammo Simsim" Samson. The commentary of the match relayed on Baghdad Radio with the words of Ismail Mohammed still remains

Later in 1956, the Assyrian Club played two friendly matches in Tehran in matches supervised by Ismail Mohammed. The Assyrian side took an early lead in the first half through Ammo Baba against Shahin FC but the match was abandoned due to several refereeing decisions that players objected to. The second and final match was a rematch with the Taj Club which the Assyrians lost 4–1. The following year, the Assyrian Club beat Racing Club de Beyrouth 5–0 with goals from Ammo Baba, Edison Eshay and a hat-trick from Kaku Gorgis. In 1960, the Assyrian side took on Tunisia and were beaten 3–1 in Aram Karam's final match.

== Name Change ==
With the changes in Iraqi league football in 1974, the Assyrian Sports Club was nationalised in 1974 and renamed Nadi Al-Tamouz Al-Riyadhi (July Sports Club), after the month in 1968 that the Ba'ath Party came to power. However the name change was unpopular with the club officials and their loyal fans, with the feeling that the club had lost its Assyrian identity and roots, the main reason for the club's foundation in the mid-Fifties. The officials at the club would spend the following decade working to change the name back to its old name. The Ministry of Youth wrote in their files dated 11 February 1984 that the club officials stated that they wanted to change to its original name of Assyrian Sports Club, three months later on 8 April 1984, the club officially requested to revert to its previous name, with the letter signed in the name of the vice-prescient of the club Youel Yacoub Sargis. On 21 December 1987, after years of trying, the request for the club to revert to its old name of Nadi Athori Al-Riyadhi or the Assyrian Sports Club was granted, and confirmed by the Olympic Committee. The request for the name change had been signed by the son of the Iraqi president Qusay Saddam Hussein, then the head of the Office for Clubs.

== Honours ==
- Iraq Central FA Premier League
  - Winners (1): 1959–60
  - Runners-up (1): 1958–59

== Notable players ==
- Ammo Baba
- Ayoub Odisho
- Basil Gorgis
- Adnan Dirjal
