= History of the Iraq national football team =

History of the Iraq national football team began with the team's first international match in 1957.

== History ==
=== Early years ===
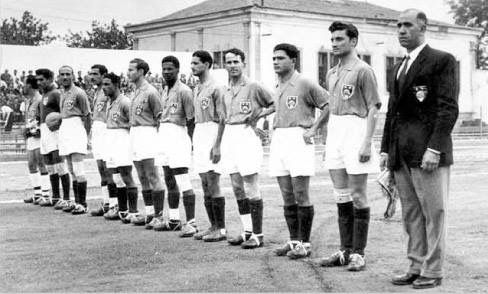
The Iraqi national football team in 1951; they played two games in the Turkish cities of İzmir and Ankara.

As early as 1923, an Iraqi team known as Baghdad XI, controlled by the Baghdad Football Association, started to play matches against British Army teams. The Baghdad FA soon disbanded and it was not until 8 October 1948 that the Iraq Football Association was founded. The Iraq FA joined FIFA in 1950 and on 13 April 1951, Iraq played their first match: a 5–0 win over the Civil Cantonment (CC) team of Habbaniyah.

Iraq's first ever official international game came in the opening game of the 1957 Pan Arab Games in Beirut where Iraq drew 3–3 to Morocco with goals from Ammo Baba, Youra Eshaya (both from Iraq's Assyrian minority) and Fakhri Mohammed Salman. One of the members of Iraq's first national team was Youra Eshaya, who in 1954 became the first Iraqi footballer to play abroad and in Europe for English Football League side Bristol Rovers.

In 1962, Iraq appointed their first foreign manager, Romanian coach Cornel Drăgușin. Iraq won their first trophy in 1964 when they won the Arab Cup, winning three and drawing one of their four games. In the following edition, they retained their Arab Cup title, beating Syria 2–1 in the final in Baghdad.

=== 1970s ===
In 1972, Iraq played at their first ever AFC Asian Cup but failed to win a game in the tournament.

In March 1973, Iraq played their first ever FIFA World Cup qualifying campaign. They finished second in their group, a point behind Australia, therefore failing to qualify for the next round.

Pos	Team	Pld	W	D	L	GF	GA	GD	Pts	Qualification	Australia	Iraq	Indonesia	New Zealand
1	Australia	6	3	3	0	15	6	+9	9	Advance to Zone B Final	—	3–1	2–1	3–3
2	Iraq	6	3	2	1	11	6	+5	8		0–0	—	1–1	2–0
3	Indonesia	6	1	2	3	6	13	−7	4		0–6	2–3	—	1–0
4	New Zealand	6	0	3	3	5	12	−7	3		1–1	0–4	1–1	—

Rules for classification: Tiebreakers

In the remaining years of the 1970s, Iraq reached the second round of the Asian Games (1974), lost the Arabian Gulf Cup final (1976), finished fourth at the AFC Asian Cup (1976), finished fourth in the Asian Games (1978) and finally hosted and won the Arabian Gulf Cup (1979). The 1976 Asian Cup would be the last Asian Cup that Iraq appeared in for the next 20 years, as they withdrew from the next four editions.

Team	Pld	W	D	L	GF	GA	GD	Pts
Iraq	6	6	0	0	23	1	+22	12
Kuwait	6	4	1	1	15	4	+11	9
Saudi Arabia	6	3	2	1	14	4	+10	8
Bahrain	6	2	2	2	8	9	−1	6
Qatar	6	2	1	3	4	13	−9	5
United Arab Emirates	6	1	0	5	5	18	−13	2
Oman	6	0	0	6	1	21	−20	1

=== 1980s – First Golden Generation ===
The 1980s was arguably Iraq's most successful period in their history. They started the decade off disappointingly, being knocked out in the first round of qualifiers for the 1982 FIFA World Cup.

Rank	Team	Pts	Pld	W	D	L	GF	GA	GD
1	Saudi Arabia	8	4	4	0	0	5	0	+5
2	Iraq	6	4	3	0	1	5	2	+3
3	Qatar	4	4	2	0	2	5	3	+2
4	Bahrain	2	4	1	0	3	1	6	−5
5	Syria	0	4	0	0	4	2	7	−5

In 1982, they won the gold medal at the 1982 Asian Games. In 1984, Iraq won the Arabian Gulf Cup. The following year, they won the 1985 Arab Cup and also won the gold medal at the 1985 Pan Arab Games.

==== 1986 FIFA World Cup ====
Iraq were seeded into the first round of qualifiers where they faced Qatar and Jordan. Iraq topped Group 1B with 6 points, and advanced to the second round. Iraq faced United Arab Emirates in two legs. Iraq defeated UAE 3–2 in Dubai. Iraq lost with 2–1 to UAE in the second leg. Iraq won 4–4 aggregate on away goals and advanced to the final round. In the final round, Iraq tied Syria 0–0 in Damascus. Iraq defeated Syria 3–1 in the second leg in Taif. Iraq won 3–1 on aggregate and qualified to the 1986 FIFA World Cup

At their first game of the Group B at the 1986 FIFA World Cup, Iraq played well against Paraguay, losing narrowly 1–0 despite scoring a goal that was controversially disallowed by referee Edwin Picon-Ackong who had blown the whistle for half-time. Iraq recorded their first World Cup goal in the second game, scoring against Belgium in a 1–2 defeat despite having ten men, with Ahmed Radhi scoring a goal for Iraq. Iraq played against hosts Mexico in the third game, losing 1–0 and being eliminated from the World Cup.

Pos	Team	Pld	W	D	L	GF	GA	GD	Pts	Qualification
1	Mexico (H)	3	2	1	0	4	2	+2	5	Advance to knockout stage
2	Paraguay	3	1	2	0	4	3	+1	4	Advance to knockout stage
3	Belgium	3	1	1	1	5	5	0	3	Advance to knockout stage
4	Iraq	3	0	0	3	1	4	−3	0	

Source: FIFA
(H) Hosts

In the following years, Iraq won the 1988 Arabian Gulf Cup and won the 1988 Arab Cup. Overall, Iraq won nine competitions in the 1980s and played in their only World Cup, leading many to believe that this was the golden era of Iraqi football. In 1989, Iraq competed in qualifying for a berth in the 1990 World Cup finals, but they lost a crucial game against Qatar.

Team	Pld	W	D	L	GF	GA	GD	Pts	QAT	IRQ	JOR	OMA
Qatar	6	3	3	0	8	3	+5	9	—	1 – 0	1 – 0	3 – 0
Iraq	6	3	2	1	11	5	+6	8	2 – 2	—	4 – 0	3 – 1
Jordan	6	2	1	3	5	7	−2	5	1 – 1	0 – 1	—	2 – 0
Oman	6	0	2	4	2	11	−9	2	0 – 0	1 – 1	0 – 2	—

Legend: Blue = home team win; Yellow = draw; Red = away team win.

=== 1990s – The Dark Era ===
Following the Gulf War in 1990, Iraq was banned from participating in the Asian Games and in most Arab competitions, leading them to participate in friendly competitions instead.

In 1993, Iraq participated in qualifiers for the 1994 FIFA World Cup and reached the final round but finished fourth in the group, missing out on a World Cup spot by two points. By drawing their last game with Japan 2–2, they denied the Japanese a place in the finals in a match referred to by the Japanese media as the Agony of Doha.

Rank	Team	Pld	W	D	L	GF	GA	GD	Pts
1	Saudi Arabia	5	2	3	0	8	6	+2	7
2	South Korea	5	2	2	1	9	4	+5	6
3	Japan	5	2	2	1	7	4	+3	6
4	Iraq	5	1	3	1	9	9	0	5
5	Iran	5	2	0	3	8	11	−3	4
6	North Korea	5	1	0	4	5	12	−7	2

Iraq participated in the 1996 AFC Asian Cup, their first Asian Cup campaign for 20 years after being banned from the previous one and withdrawing from the three before that. They reached the quarter-finals but lost to the United Arab Emirates due to a golden goal scored by Abdulrahman Ibrahim. In 1996, Iraq was ranked 139th in the world, which is their worst FIFA ranking in their history due to inactivity after withdrawing from several tournaments.

In 1997, Iraq participated in qualifiers for the 1998 FIFA World Cup but were knocked out at the first round following two defeats to Kazakhstan.

Team	Pld	W	D	L	GF	GA	GD	Pts
Kazakhstan	4	4	0	0	15	2	+13	12
Iraq	4	2	0	2	14	8	+6	6
Pakistan	4	0	0	4	3	22	−19	0

Source: RSSSF

This period is known as 'The Dark Era' as Uday Hussein, the son of Saddam Hussein, abused his control of Iraqi football and tortured players who played poorly, punishing them by sending them to prison, making them bathe in raw sewage and kick concrete balls, and shaving their heads among many other punishments.

=== 2000s – Second Golden Generation ===
The 2000s was widely considered to be the rebirth and rise of one of Iraq's greatest football generation second only to the 1980s generation.

However, Iraq had a rocky beginning. It played in the 2000 AFC Asian Cup but were knocked out at the quarter-final stage again, this time by Japan in a 4–1 loss. Iraq reached the second round of 2002 FIFA World Cup qualification but lost five of their eight second-round games and therefore failed to make the finals. Iraq won their first ever WAFF Championship in 2002, beating Jordan 3–2 in the final after extra time despite being two goals down.

In 2004, Iraq once again reached the quarter-finals of the AFC Asian Cup before getting knocked out by China. In the same year they were knocked out at the second round of 2006 FIFA World Cup qualifiers by Uzbekistan.

Iraq were ranked as high as 39th in the World Rankings in October 2004 which is their highest ranking position in their history. The following year, Iraq won the gold medal in the West Asian Games by beating Syria in the final via a penalty shootout. In 2007, Iraq were knocked out at the group stage of the Arabian Gulf Cup. The exit from the Gulf Cup happened in very controversial circumstances as Iraq attempted to make an agreement with Saudi Arabia to draw the final game which would put both teams through to the next round; the Iraq manager Akram Salman told the Iraqi players not to win the game but the Saudi Arabian players were unaware of any agreement and went on to win the game and knock Iraq out of the cup. Akram Salman was sacked and Jorvan Vieira appointed as head coach. Under him, Iraq reached the final of the WAFF Championship but lost 2–1 to Iran.

==== 2007 AFC Asian Cup triumph ====
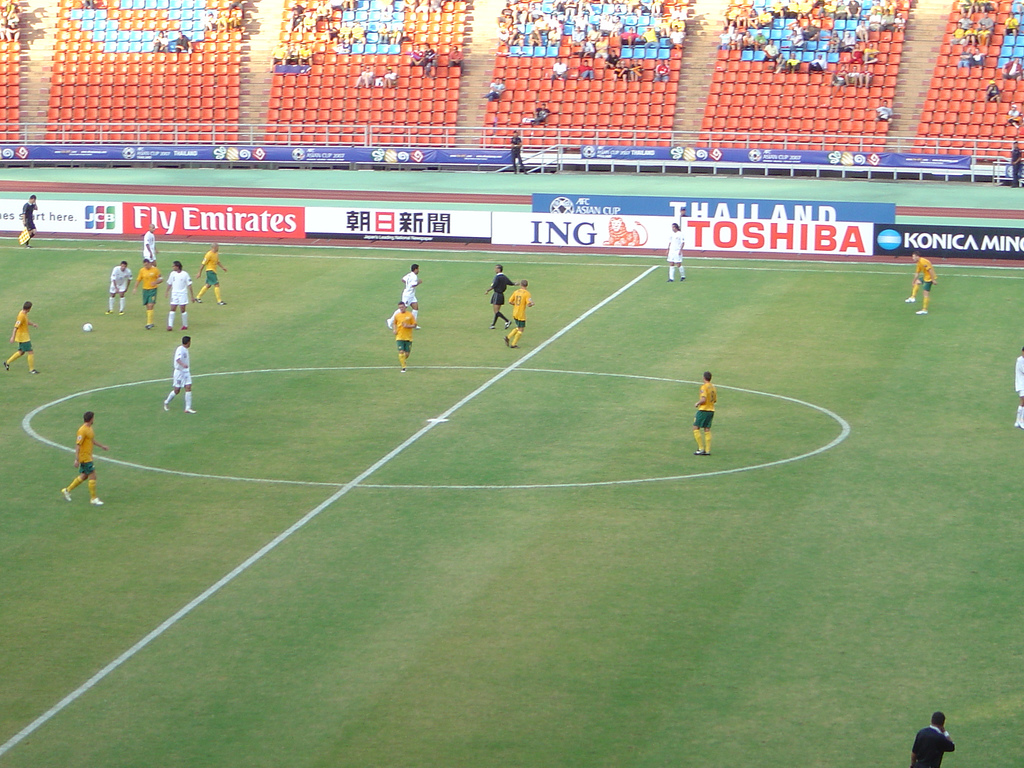
Iraq playing against Australia in Group A of the 2007 AFC Asian Cup; Iraq won the game 3–1 on their way to winning the cup.

In July 2007, Iraq kicked off their 2007 AFC Asian Cup campaign. The squad was made mainly of players that had finished fourth at the 2004 Olympic Games and finished second at the 2006 Asian Games. Vieira only had two months to prepare his team for the tournament, and the team suffered from very poor facilities. The Iraq FA struggled to provide the team with enough kits for the tournament and Iraq had not been able to play any previous games in their own country for security reasons and most of the players had had family members killed in the war.

The team started the tournament with a 1–1 draw against joint-hosts Thailand before producing a 3–1 win over favourites Australia. A draw with Oman followed to put Iraq into the quarter-finals where two goals from Younis Mahmoud against Vietnam put Iraq into the semi-finals for the second time in their history. They manages to knock out one of the best Asian teams, South Korea in the semis via a penalty shootout in which Noor Sabri made a crucial save. After the game, a suicide bomber killed 30 football fans who were celebrating the semi-final win over South Korea and this almost led to the Iraqi team withdrawing from the final, but they decided to go on in honour of the dead and succeeded in doing that after defeating Saudi Arabia 1–0 in the final, a game that they dominated from start to finish and that was won by a Younis Mahmoud header. This tournament win is seen as one of the greatest upsets in international history as a war-torn country became international champions in what is described as one of sport's greatest 'fairytales'.

==== Asian Cup aftermath ====
Vieira stated during the final that he would resign after the Asian Cup. He was replaced by Egil Olsen in September 2007. Under Olsen, Iraq advanced to the third round of World Cup qualifiers, but after a 1–1 draw with China, the FA sacked Olsen and replaced him with Adnan Hamad. Iraq failed to advance to the final round of 2010 FIFA World Cup qualifiers as a 1–0 defeat to Qatar saw them finish in third in the group. Following this, the Iraq FA decided to disband the team and sacked Hamad.

Jorvan Vieira was reappointed in September 2008. After a disappointing 2009 Arabian Gulf Cup, Vieira was sacked and replaced by Bora Milutinovic.

==== 2009 FIFA Confederations Cup ====
In 2009, Iraq participated in only their second FIFA tournament ever: the 2009 FIFA Confederations Cup, which they qualified for by winning the 2007 AFC Asian Cup. They started the tournament with a 0–0 draw with hosts South Africa, before losing 1–0 to UEFA Euro 2008 winners Spain. Iraq drew the last game 0–0 with New Zealand and were knocked out.

On 20 November 2009, the FIFA Emergency Committee suspended the Iraq FA due to government interference; the suspension was lifted on 19 March 2010.

=== 2010s – Ups and downs ===
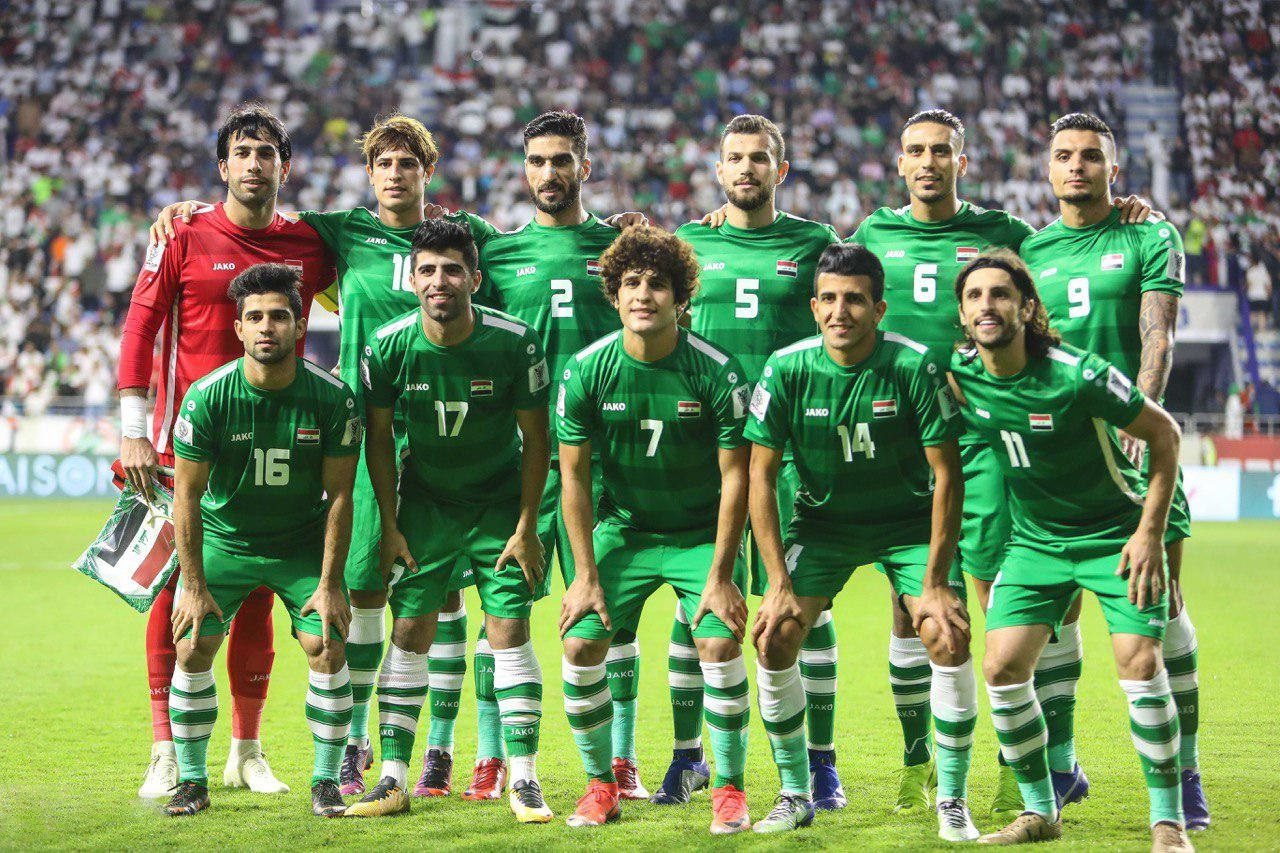
The Iraqi national team pose ahead of their 2019 AFC Asian Cup match against Iran in Dubai.

In the 2011 AFC Asian Cup, Iraq reached the quarter finals, as they lost 1–0 to Australia. The match went into extra time with Harry Kewell heading in a goal in the 117th minute just inside the 18-yard box. In the 2014 FIFA World Cup qualification, Iraq topped the group in the third round but finished bottom of their group in the final round.

On the last matchday, Iraq qualified for the 2015 AFC Asian Cup by beating China 3–1. In the 2015 AFC Asian Cup, Iraq defeated Iran in the quarter-finals in penalties, 7–6, after the game ended 3–3 after 120 minutes of play. They faced South Korea in the semi-finals but lost 0–2 and failed to progress to the final. Iraq finished the AFC Asian Cup in fourth place, after losing 2–3 to United Arab Emirates in third place match.

Four years later, Iraq finished fifth in the final round of the 2018 FIFA World Cup qualification.

On 3 September 2018, Srečko Katanec was appointed as head coach on a three-year contract. Under Katanec, Iraq reached the round of 16 of the 2019 AFC Asian Cup as they lost 1–0 to eventual champions Qatar.

=== 2020s ===
Under Katanec, Iraq reached the final round of 2022 FIFA World Cup qualification with five wins from eight matches including a 2–1 victory against Iran. Iraq went 19 consecutive matches without losing between 2019 and 2021 and moved up from 89th to 68th in the FIFA rankings during Katanec's tenure. Katanec departed in July 2021 after six months of unpaid wages and filed a complaint with FIFA.

On 31 July 2021, Dutchman Dick Advocaat was appointed head coach of Iraq. Under Advocaat, Iraq made to a slow start to the third round of World Cup Qualifiers, drawing four games and losing two, and on 21 November 2021, Advocaat resigned. Željko Petrović took charge of the team for the 2021 FIFA Arab Cup, where Iraq were eliminated from the group stage. Petrović was sacked after two further winless qualifying games and Abdul-Ghani Shahad was appointed as an interim manager, but Iraq were eliminated after finishing fourth in the group.

On 7 November 2022, Jesús Casas was appointed head coach of Iraq to lead the national team in the 2023 AFC Asian Cup and 2026 FIFA World Cup qualification.
