= Tamar Fattah Ramadhan Kuchar =

Kurdish politician

Governor Tamar Fattah Ramadhan Kuchar

Governor of Dahuk
- In office 2005–2014
- Appointed by: Dahuk Provincial Council
- Deputy: Gurgis Shlaymun
- Preceded by: Nechirvan Ahmad
- Succeeded by: Farhad Atrushi

Personal details
- Party: Kurdistan Democratic Party (KDP)
- Profession: Politician
- Known for: Improved education and infrastructure in Dahuk, convicted of corruption in 2017
- Website: Duhok Governorate

Tamar Ramadhan Fattah Kuchar was the governor of Iraq's Dahuk province in Iraqi Kurdistan between 2005 and 2013. He has been actively involved in further developing Dahuk's educational and infrastructure capabilities.
