= Zia Shaoul =

Iraqi former footballer

Personal information
- Full name: Zia Shaoul Gorgis
- Place of birth: Habbaniyah, Iraq
- Position: Midfielder

Senior career*
Years	Team	Apps	(Gls)
1948–1950	Levy Civilian		
1950–1952	Civil Cantonment		
1952–1954	Sharikat Naft Al-Basra		
1955–1957	Al-Athori		
1957–1959	Maslahat Naqil Al-Rukab		
1959–1960	Al-Minaa		
1960–1962	Eintracht Frankfurt II		

International career
1957–1959	Iraq		

Managerial career
- 1955–1957: Al-Athori
- 1962–1967: Viktoria Kelsterbach
- * Club domestic league appearances and goals

Zia Shaoul (Arabic: زيا شاؤول) is an Iraqi former football, who played as a midfielder for Iraq in the 1957 Arab Games.

== Club career ==
Zia Shaoul started his footballing career with Levy Civilian and Civil Cantonment in his birthplace of Habbaniyah. he was versatile player, who was able to play in defence, midfield or even as a forward. In 1952, he joined Sharikat Naft Al-Basra team, where he played until 1953. In 1955, he moved to Baghdad and was appointed as captain and coach of Al-Athori, he was the first coach of Al-Athori team, who took over in a player-coach role after the team was formed in 1955. In 1957, he joined Maslahat Naqil Al-Rukab. In 1959, he moved to play for the Al-Minaa team, and participated in the match that was held in Basra against Algeria national football team in 1959. In 1961, he left Iraq and joined the amateur team of 1960 European Cup finalists Eintracht Frankfurt of then West Germany. Zia retired from playing in 1962 after the club decided against renewing his contract for another season.

== International career ==
Zia Shaoul was first picked to represent Iraq in 1957, when the Iraq coach Ismail Mohammed selected Zia to be a part of his squad to play in 1957 Arab Games. In 1959, Iraq coach Shawqi Abboud chose Zia as part of the national team squad that played several friendly matches with clubs from Eastern European countries.

== Coaching career ==
After retiring Zia coached a local side called Viktoria Kelsterbach for 5 years until he left Germany and immigrated to Canada in 1967. In 1971, he left Canada and immigrated again this time to Australia, where he formed a football team.
