= Saad Abdul-Hameed =

Iraqi footballer (born 1968)

Personal information
- Full name: Saad Abdul-Hameed Benyamin
- Date of birth: 21 October 1968 (age 58)
- Place of birth: Iraq
- Position: Defender

Team information
- Current team: Iraq U16 (Assist. Manager)

Senior career*
Years	Team	Apps	(Gls)
1986–1988	Al-Shabab SC		
1988–1993	Al-Quwa Al-Jawiya		
1993–1994	Al-Zawraa		
1994–1996	Club Africain		
1996–1997	Al-Zawraa		
1997–1999	Al-Quwa Al-Jawiya		
1999–2002	Al-Shorta		
2002–2003	Salahaddin FC		

International career
1988–1994	Iraq		

Managerial career
- 2002: Al-Zawraa
- 2021–: Iraq U16 (Assist. Manager)
- * Club domestic league appearances and goals

Saad Abdul-Hameed Benyamin (Arabic: سَعْد عَبْد الْحَمِيد بِنْيَامِين; born 21 October 1968) is an Iraqi former international football player. An ethnic Assyrian, Benyamin played for Al-Zawraa, Al-Quwa Al-Jawiya, Al-Shorta, and Club Africain. In 1988, Saad was called up to play for the Iraqi U-19 in the Asian Youth Championship in Doha, Qatar, where the team won the tournament and qualified to play in the 1989 World Youth Championship in Saudi Arabia. In 1988, he was given his international debut and become a permanent fixture of the Iraqi national team until 1994.

Saad was an attacking left back or left side of midfield. He started his career at Al-Shabab alongside captain Basil Gorgis, Hameed Rasheed and Ismail Mohammed.

After the large flow of top players turning professional and moving abroad, Saad decided to move, playing for Tunisian team Club Africain during the mid-90s.

International Caps
Caps	Goals	Score	Opponent	Competition	Location	Report	Date
1		2-3	North Korea	1994 World Cup qualification	Khalifa Stadium, Doha	Report	October 15, 1993
2		2-1	Iran	1994 World Cup qualification	Khalifa Stadium, Doha	Report	October 22, 1993
3		1-1	Saudi Arabia	1994 World Cup qualification	Al-Ahly Stadium, Doha	Report	October 24, 1993
4		2-2	Japan	1994 World Cup qualification	Al-Ahly Stadium, Doha	Report	October 28, 1993
