= Al-Adhamiya SC =

Iraqi football club

- Full name: Al-Adhamiya Sport Club
- Founded: 1951; 74 years ago
- Ground: Al-Adhamiya Stadium
- Chairman: Mohammed Abdul-Sattar
- Manager: Nazar Nayef
- League: Iraqi Third Division League
Home colours	Away colours

Al-Adhamiya Sport Club (Arabic: نادي الأعظمية الرياضي) is an Iraqi sports club based in Al-Adhamiyah, Baghdad.

== History ==
=== Early years ===
Al-Adhamiya was founded in 1951 and competed in the Iraq Central FA Premier League from 1957–58 until 1959–60 when they were relegated.

=== Al-Jumhouriya Al-Olympi ===
In 1967, Al-Adhamiya merged with Al-Jumhouriya Al-Olympi to form Markaz Al-Shabab Al-Adhamiya. Al-Jumhouriya Al-Olympi were a club founded in 1934 as Al-Olympi Al-Malaki, later renaming to Al-Malaki in 1943, Al-Jumhouriya in 1958 and Al-Jumhouriya Al-Olympi in 1959. Under the name Al-Malaki, the club had competed in the first edition of the Iraq Central FA Premier League and the first edition of the Iraq FA Cup. Al-Malaki (nicknamed the "Blue Boys") housed the first headquarters of the Iraq Football Association (IFA) in the late 1940s and early 1950s and helped organise the IFA competitions in Baghdad.

=== In Premier League ===
In 1974, the club returned to the name Al-Adhamiya. Al-Adhamiya team played in the Iraqi Premier League for the first time in the 1980–81 season, and the team was not good enough, and finished the season at the bottom of the standings, and eventually relegated to the Iraqi First Division League.

== Managerial history ==
- (Iraq) Sattar Jawad
- (Iraq) Nazar Nayef

== Famous players ==
- (Iraq) Jamil Abbas (1946–1949)
- (Iraq) Nazar Ashraf (1970–1974)

== Honours ==
- Iraqi Premier Division League (second tier)
  - Winners (1): 1979–80
