= Jalil Shihab =

Iraqi footballer (born 1927)

Jalil Shihab (Arabic: جليل شهاب; born 1927) is an Iraqi former football player and coach.

He became the first Iraqi to have played and coached the full national side when he was appointed to be the head coach of the national side in 1967. He took charge of the Iraq national team at the 1967 Fairs' Cup in Tripoli, lifting the cup ahead of hosts Libya and Sudan.

Shihab played most of his career at left back or left centre back at Al-Quwa Al-Jawiya in the 1950s and early 1960s, and went on to coach Al-Quwa Al-Jawiya, Al-Bareed, the Baghdad Youth XI, Iraq Army Youth XI and Al-Farqa Al-Thalatha during his career.
