= Albert Khoshaba =

Iraqi association football player

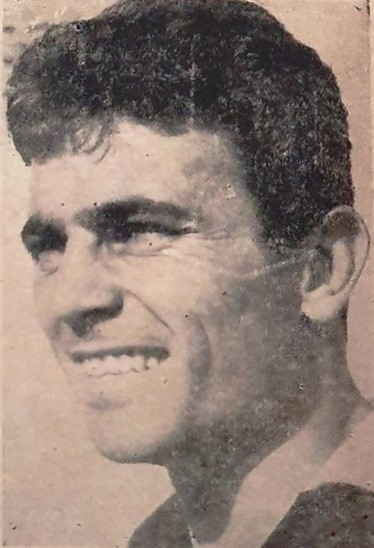

Personal information
- Full name: Albert Khoshaba
- Date of birth: 1 January 1936 (age 90)
- Place of birth: Iraq
- Position: Forward

International career
Years	Team	Apps	(Gls)
1967–1968	Iraq	2	(1)

Albert Khoshaba David (born 1 January 1936) is a former Iraqi football forward who played for Iraq between 1967 and 1968. He played two matches and scored one goal.

== Career statistics ==
=== International goals ===
Scores and results list Iraq's goal tally first.

No	Date	Venue	Opponent	Score	Result	Competition
1.	10 March 1967	June 11 Stadium, Tripoli	Sudan	1–0	2–2	Friendly
