= Assyrians in Iraq =

Ethnic group

Iraqi Assyrians
- (Assyrian homeland) (Iraq)
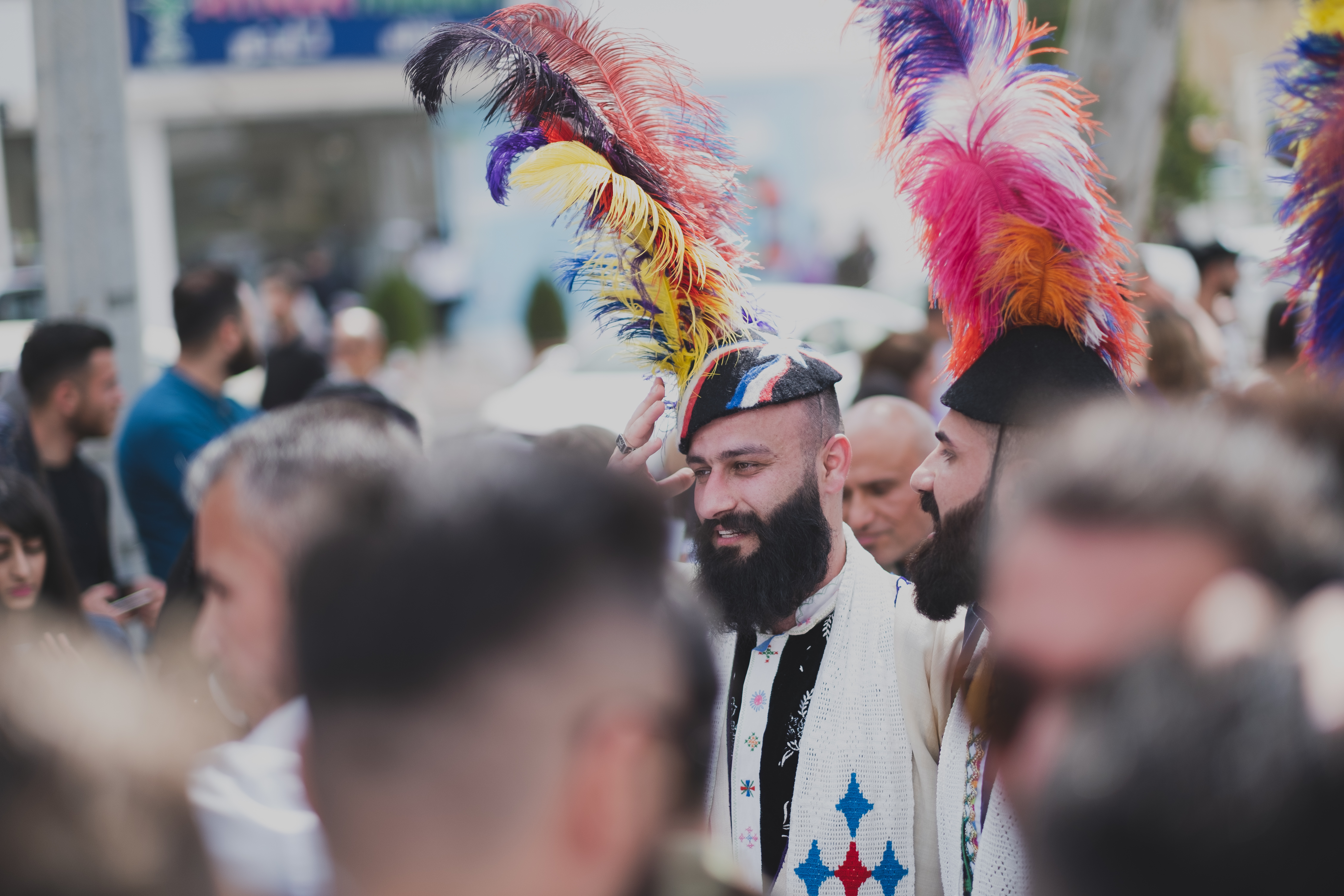
- The Assyrian New Year, Akitu festival (2019) in Duhok (Nohaadra)

Total population
- c.500,000-600,000 (2022 est.); 300,000 - 400,000 (pre 2014 ISIS invasion); 800,000 - 1.8 million (pre-Assyrian exodus)

Regions with significant populations
- Nineveh Plains, Dohuk Governorate, Erbil Governorate, Baghdad, Mosul, Kirkuk, Habbaniya (pre-1990s), Assyrian diaspora

Languages
- Neo-Aramaic (Suret, specifically Iraqi Koine); Mesopotamian Arabic Kurdish language

Religion
- Mainly Christianity (majority: Syriac Christianity; minority: Protestantism)

Related ethnic groups
- Iraqi Jews; Mandaeans; Armenians

Iraqi Assyrians (Syriac: ܣܘܪ̈ܝܐ ܕܥܝܪܐܩ, Arabic: آشوريو العراق, Kurdish: ئاشوورییەکانی عێراق) are an ethnic and linguistic minority group, indigenous to Upper Mesopotamia. They are defined as Assyrians residing in the country of Iraq, or members of the Assyrian diaspora who are of Iraqi-Assyrian heritage. They share a common history and ethnic identity, rooted in shared linguistic, cultural and religious traditions, with Assyrians in Iran, Turkey and Syria, as well as with the Assyrian diaspora elsewhere. A significant number have emigrated to the United States, notably to the Detroit and Chicago; sizeable communities are also found in Sydney, Australia and Södertälje, Sweden.

== Background ==
=== Ancient history ===
The Assyrians are typically Syriac-speaking Christians who claim descent from Ancient Assyria, one of the oldest civilizations in the world, dating back to 2500 BC in ancient Mesopotamia.

Scholars have said that Kurds also fought against the Assyrian Christians because they feared that Armenians or their European allies could take control of the area. Both Arabs and Kurds thought of the Assyrians as foreigners and as allies of colonial Britain.

Persecution of Assyrians has a long and bitter history. In 1895, in Diyarbakır, Kurdish and Turkish militia began attacking Christians, plundering Assyrian villages. In 1915, Kurds and Turks plundered villages, about 7000 Assyrians were killed. In 1915, Turkish troops "with Kurdish detachments" committed mass slaughters of Assyrians in Persia. In the Assyrian village of Haftvan almost 1000 people were beheaded.

In 1894, the French diplomat Paul Cambon described the creation of Kurdish Hamidies regiments as "the official organization for pillage at the expense of Armenian Christians". In these places "the system of persecutions and extorsions became intolerable to populations who had become accustomed to their slavery". According to Cambon, the Porte refused reforms and persisted in "maintaining a veritable regime of terror, arrests, assassinations and rape.". In 1924, the Muslim Kurds around Sheik Said "rose in revolt against the "atheist government of Ankara" and demanded autonomy, the restoration of religious laws and of the sultanate". In 1932, Iraqi forces commanded by Kurdish general Bakr Sidki killed 600 Assyrians at Simel, near Mosul. Kurds committed the slaughter "in which 65 Nestorian villages in northern Iraq were plundered and burned down, priests were tortured and Christians were forced to renounce their religion while others in Dohuk were deported and about a 100 were shot". In 1843, Nestorians in the Tauris region refused to pay Kurds the jizya, and "by way of reprisal 4350 Nestroians were slaughtered, about 400 women and children were reduced to slavery and all their houses and churches destroyed". Historians have noted that in "Kurdistan Jews, Nestorians and Armenians were subject to tallage and corvees at whim of authorities".

Historians have noted that Bedir Khan Beg (also known as Bedirhan) called the Kurdish Muslims to fight a sacred war against the Assyrians and Armenians, and ordered to massacre and annihilate them. Kurdish writers have recounted that "the Kurdish troops attacked the Assyrians and started slaughters. Consequently, a few Assyrians were killed, their villages were destroyed and set into fire... For the second time, in 1846, the Assyrians residing at the Thuma region have been massacred...." British writer William Eagleton said that "in 1843 and 1846, Bedirhan started a massacre and booting campaign against the Christian Assyrians (Nestorians) he was anxious about whose getting stronger and independent through becoming able to rule themselves. It was intolerable for Bedirhan to see the Assyrians living on his own territories getting stronger. Thus he killed ten thousand Assyrians. Even though Bedirhan was a feudal tribal leader, he was expressing the aspirations of Kurdish nationalism." Kurdish and Arab attacks on Assyrians continued, culminating in the August 1933 Simele massacres. About 3000 Assyrians were killed in that single month alone.

Beginning in August 1933, Iraqi soldiers and Kurdish militia killed thousands of Assyrians in Simele (Iraq). The massacre had a big influence on Raphael Lemkin, the jurist who coined the word "genocide. The Simmele Massacre is also commemorated yearly with the official Assyrian Martyrs Day on 7 August. The massacre was carried out by the Iraqi Army, led by Kurdish General Bakir Sidqi, and Kurdish and Arab irregulars. There were about 3,000 victims of the massacre.

== History ==
=== Independent Kingdom of Iraq ===
During July 1933, about 800 armed Assyrians headed for the Syrian border, where they were turned back by the French. While King Faisal had briefly left the country for medical reasons, the Minister of Interior, Hikmat Sulayman, adopted a policy aimed at a final solution of the "Assyrian problem". This policy was implemented by an Iraqi-Kurd, General Bakr Sidqi. After engaging in several unsuccessful clashes with armed Assyrian tribesmen, on 11 August 1933, Sidqi permitted his men to attack and kill about 3,000 unarmed Assyrian civilian villagers, including women, children and the elderly, at the Assyrian villages of Sumail (Simele) district, and later at Suryia. Having scapegoated the Assyrians as dangerous national traitors, this massacre of unarmed civilians became a symbol of national pride, and enhanced Sidqi's prestige. The British, though represented by a powerful military presence as provided by the Anglo-Iraqi Treaty of 1930, failed to intervene or allow the well-disciplined Assyrian Levies under their command to do so, and indeed helped whitewash the event at the League of Nations.

The Assyrian repression marked the entrance of the military into Iraqi politics, a pattern that has periodically re-emerged since 1958, and offered an excuse for enlarging conscription.

=== Republic of Iraq ===
In the early 1970s, the secularist Ba'ath regime initially tried to change the suppression of Assyrians in Iraq through different laws that were passed. On 20 February 1972, the government passed the law to recognize the cultural rights of Assyrians by allowing Aramaic be taught schools in which the majority of pupils spoke that language in addition to Arabic. Aramaic was also to be taught at intermediate and secondary schools in which the majority of students spoke that language in addition to Arabic, but it never happened. Special Assyrian programs were to be broadcast on public radio and television and three Syriac-language magazines were planned to be published in the capital. An Association of Syriac-Speaking Authors and Writers had also been established.

The bill turned out to be a failure. The radio stations created as the result of this decree were closed after a few months. While the two magazines were allowed to be published, only 10 percent of their material was in Aramaic. No school was allowed to teach in Aramaic either.

==== Pre-invasion Iraq ====
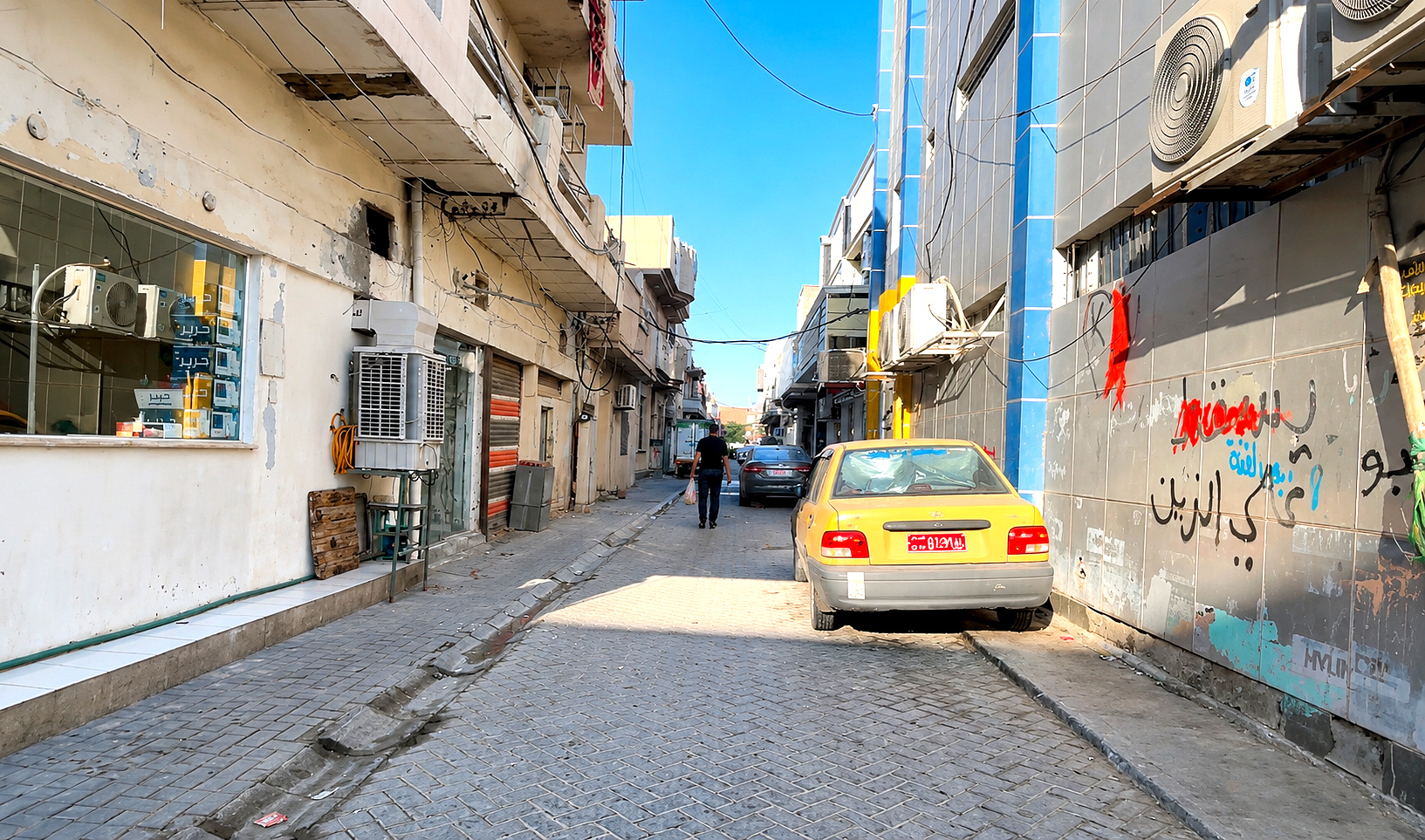
Garage al-Amana, an Assyrian neighbourhood in Baghdad with a large Assyrian population during the 20th century

Reports from various sources "indicate a better human rights situation overall in the Kurdish-controlled areas of Northern Iraq than exists elsewhere in the country" (AI 2000, 135; U.K. Immigration & Nationality Directorate Sept. 1999; USDOS 25 Feb. 2000) Also, according to the reports, "while freedom of speech, religion, movement, and press are strongly restricted throughout Iraq, these freedoms do exist to a certain extent in parts of the Kurd-controlled area "(USDOS 25 Feb. 2000). However, reports regarding isolated human rights abuses continued in 1999. The US State government reported that in 1999 Assyrian Christian Helena Aloun Sawa was murdered, and according to AINA, "the murder resembles a well-established pattern of complicity by Kurdish authorities in attacks against Assyrian Christians in the north". The murder was investigated by a commission appointed by the KDP but no results of the investigation were reported by year's end. There were also incidents of mob violence by Muslims against Christians in northern Iraq. Christian Assyrians were also targeted in a series of bombings in Erbil in 1998 to 1999, and Assyrian groups have criticized the KRG for the lack of investigation. According to the AINA, the KDP blockaded Assyrian villages in 1999 and "later entered the villages and beat villagers". However, after invervention by the International Committee of the Red Cross the KDP left the villages again.

According to the UK Immigration & Nationality Directorate "despite Tariq Aziz's lofty position in the Baghdad regime, Christians have little political influence in the Ba'ath government" (Sept. 1999).

Education in any language other than Arabic and Kurdish was prohibited by the government in Baghdad. Therefore, Assyrians were not permitted to attend classes in Syriac. In the Kurdish-controlled northern areas, classes in Syriac have been permitted since 1991. However, according to some Assyrian sources "regional Kurdish authorities refused to allow the classes to begin." However, details of this practice were not available, and Kurdish authorities denied the accusations. In 1999, the Kurdistan Observer claimed that "the Central Government had warned the administration in the Kurdish region against allowing Turkoman, Assyrian, or Yazidi minority schools."

According to the UK Immigration & Nationality Directorate, "the Central Government has engaged various abuses against the Assyrian Christians, and has often suspected them of 'collaborating' with Kurds" (Sept. 1999). According to a report by The World Directory of Minorities "Assyrians were unable to avoid the Kurdish conflict. As with the Kurds, some supported the government, others allied themselves with the Kurdish nationalist movement" (Minority Rights Group International 1997, 346).

==== Post-invasion Iraq ====
After the 2003 Invasion of Iraq by US and its allies, the Coalition Provisional Authority disbanded the Iraqi military, security, and intelligence infrastructure of former President Saddam Hussein and began a process of "de-Baathification". This process became an object of controversy, cited by some critics as the biggest American mistake made in the immediate aftermath of the Invasion of Iraq, and as one of the main causes in the deteriorating security situation throughout Iraq. Social unrest and chaos resulted in the unprovoked persecution of Assyrians in Iraq mostly by Islamic extremists (both Shia and Sunni) and Kurdish nationalists (ex. Dohuk Riots of 2011 aimed at Assyrians & Yazidis).

Iraqi Christians have been victims of executions, forced displacement campaigns, torture, violence and the target of Islamist groups like al-Qaeda and ISIS. Since the 2003 Iraq War, Iraqi Christians have fled from the country and their population has collapsed under the Government of Iraq.

On 1 August 2004 a series of car bomb attacks took place during the Sunday evening Mass in churches in Baghdad and Mosul, killing and wounding a large number of Christians. The Jordanian jihadist and 1st emir of Al-Qaeda in Iraq Abu Musab al-Zarqawi was blamed for the attacks.

In 2006, an Orthodox priest, Boulos Iskander, was snatched off the streets of Mosul by a Sunni Arab group that demanded a ransom. His body was later found, with his arms and legs having been cut off.

In 2007, there were reports of a push to drive Christians out of the historically Christian suburb of Dora in southern Baghdad, with some Sunni extremists accusing the Christians of being allies of the Americans. A total number of 239 similar cases were registered by police between 2007 and 2009.

In 2008, a priest called Ragheed Ganni, was shot dead in his church along with three of his companions. In the same year, there were reports that Christian students were being harassed.

In 2008, the charity Barnabas conducted research into 250 Iraqi Christian IDPs who had fled to the north of the country (Iraqi Kurdistan) to seek refugee status and found nearly half had witnessed attacks on churches or Christians, or been personally targeted by violence.

In 2009, the Kurdistan Regional Government reported that more than 40,000 Christians had moved from Baghdad, Basra and Mosul to the Iraqi Kurdistan cities. The reports also stated that the number of Christian families moving to Iraqi Kurdistan is growing and they were providing support and financial assistance for 11,000 of those families, and some are employed by the KRG.

In 2010, Sunni Islamist groups attacked a Syrian Catholic church in Baghdad during Sunday evening Mass on 31 October, killing more than 60 and wounding 78 Iraqi Christians.

In 2011, Islamist extremists assassinated Christians randomly using sniper rifles. Two months before the incident, two Christians had been shot for unknown reasons in Baghdad and two other Christians had been shot by Jihadis in Mosul. Human rights organizations have recorded 66 assault cases on churches and monasteries until 2012, as well as about 200 kidnappings. On 30 May 2011, a Christian man was beheaded by a Salafi extremist in Mosul.

On 2 August 2011 a Catholic church was bombed by Sunni extremists in the Turkmen area of Kirkuk, wounding more than 23 Christians.

On 15 August 2011 a church was bombed by al-Qaeda in the center of Kirkuk.

In 2014, during the 2014 Northern Iraq offensive, the Islamic State of Iraq (ISIS) ordered all Christians in the area of its control, where the Iraqi Army had collapsed, to pay a special tax of approximately $470 per family, convert to Islam, or be killed. Many of them took refuge in nearby Kurdish-controlled regions of Iraq.

After Saddam Hussein's fall in 2003, the Assyrian Democratic Movement was one of the smaller political parties that emerged in the social chaos of the occupation. Its officials say that while armed members of the Assyrian Democratic Movement also took part in the liberation of the key oil cities of Kirkuk and Mosul in the north, the Assyrians were not invited to join the steering committee that was charged with defining Iraq's future. The ethnic make-up of the Iraq Interim Governing Council briefly (September 2003 – June 2004) guiding Iraq after the invasion included a single Assyrian Christian, Younadem Kana, a leader of the Assyrian Democratic Movement and an opponent of Saddam Hussein since 1979.

Assyrians in post-Saddam Iraq have faced a high rate of persecution by fundamentalist Islamists since the beginning of the Iraq War. By early August 2004 this persecution included church bombings, and fundamentalist groups' enforcement of Muslim codes of behavior upon Christians, e.g., banning alcohol, forcing women to wear hijab. The violence against the community has led to the exodus of perhaps as much as half of the community. While Assyrians made up only just over 5% of the total Iraqi population before the war, according to the United Nations, Assyrians are over-represented among the Iraqi refugees (as much as 13%) who are stranded in Syria, Jordan, Lebanon, and Turkey.

A large number of Assyrians have found refuge in ancient Assyrian Christian villages in Nineveh Plains and Kurdistan Region. This led some Assyrians and Iraqi and foreign politicians to call for an Assyrian Christian autonomous region in those areas.

In 2008 the Assyrians formed their own militia, the Qaraqosh Protection Committee to protect Assyrian towns, villages and regions in the north. In 2008 the Assyrian Archbishop Paulos Faraj Rahho of the Chaldean Catholic Church in Mosul was assassinated by some Kurds while some have claimed assassins were hired by local Arab tribes. Rahho was a defender of Assyrian self-administration. Some observers have claimed that Kurdish KDP forces often used to practice their shooting on important Assyrian cultural heritage sites.

Kurdish KDP security forces have been criticized for human rights abuses, abuses "ranged from threats and intimidation to detention in undisclosed locations without due process." In 2015, the local KDP security forces arrested and detained political activist Kamal Said Kadir, for having written articles on the Internet critical of the KDP. He was sentenced to 30 years in prison. Some activists have claimed that membership in Kurdish parties is necessary to obtain "employment and educational opportunities" in Iraqi Kurdistan. The US State department report said that "Kurdish authorities abused and discriminated against minorities in the North, including Turcomen, Arabs, Christians, and Shabak", and that Kurdish authorities "denied services to some villages, arrested minorities without due process and took them to undisclosed locations for detention, and pressured minority schools to teach in the Kurdish language". Christian minorities in Kirkuk also "charged that Kurdish security forces targeted Arabs and Turcomen".

Assyrians have criticized the kurdification of the school curricula, and have complained about the confiscation and occupation of Assyrian lands, and "that the Kurds invent new and impossible laws when the legitimate owners ask for their lands". Assyrians have criticized that while Kurds are very well funded, the Assyrian Christians receive almost no funding for their schools. Assyrians have also said that Kurds have modified and falsified school textbooks (kurdification) and changed traditional Christian names to Kurdish names. In textbooks it was even claimed that some biblical figures were Kurdish. It was reported that the man accused of killing the Christian politician Francis Yousif Shabo in 1993 is "allowed to walk around freely" in Kurdistan. The impunity for those who attacked or killed Assyrians in the Kurdistan region was criticized. Assyrian Christian David Jindo was one of many murdered Christian politicians. Other prominent Assyrian leaders who were killed by Kurdish nationalists include Patriarch Mar Shimun, Franso Hariri, Margaret George (one of the first female Peshmerga) and Francis Shabo. Many of these figures were killed "in spite of their attempts to engage with, or work under, Kurds".

The US State government also reported that in Kurdish controlled areas Assyrian schools and classes in Syriac were not permitted or even prevented in some cases. There were also incidents of mob violence by Kurdistan Workers party (KWP) against Christians in northern Iraq. Christian Assyrians were also targeted in a series of bombings in Erbil in 1998 to 1999, and Assyrian groups have criticized the KRG for the lack of investigation. According to the US Department of State the KDP blockaded Assyrian villages in 1999 and "later entered the villages and beat villagers". However, after invervention by the International Committee of the Red Cross the KDP left the villages again.

An example of Kurdification is the attack on the Assyrian town Rabatki in 2013 by General Aref al-Zebari and his brother Habib al-Hares Zabari, reportedly by Kurdish peshmerga soldiers. It has been reported that many Assyrian girls are forced into prostitution by Kurdish criminal organizations, and the families of these girls have also been threatened.

In an interview with Aid to the Church in Need, bishop Jules Boutros, of the Syriac Catholic Church, said most young Syriacs were trying to get out of Iraq. "Most of our young people are trying to get out of Iraq and Syria. They find it difficult to stay in Iraq, because they have lost confidence in their government, they have faced so much persecution. More than 60,000 Syriacs were forced to leave the Nineveh Plain in one night. In total, more than 120,000 Christians were obliged to flee to Kurdistan, and from there they have been going to the west. A good number returned home, and that is a good sign, because we have a mission in this part of the Middle East. But many families are still trying to get out."

==== Jyllands-Posten Muhammad cartoons ====
The publication of satirical cartoons of the Islamic prophet Muhammad in the Danish newspaper Jyllands-Posten on 30 September 2005 led to an increase in violence against the Assyrian community. At first, the cartoons did not get much attention, but when the Egyptian media picked up on the publication in late December 2005, violence and protests erupted around the world.

On 29 January, six churches in the Iraqi cities of Baghdad and Kirkuk were targeted by car bombs, killing 13-year-old worshipper Fadi Raad Elias. No militants claimed to be retaliating for the pictures, nor was this the first time Iraqi churches have been bombed; but the bishop of the church stated "The church blasts were a reaction to the cartoons published in European papers. But Christians are not responsible for what is published in Europe." Many Assyrians in Iraq now feel like "Westerners should not give wild statements [as] everyone can attack us [in response]" and "Today I'm afraid to walk the streets, because I'm Christian."

Also on 29 January, a Muslim Cleric in the Iraqi city of Mosul issued a fatwa stating, "Expel the (Assyrian) Crusaders and infidels from the streets, schools, and institutions because they have offended the person of the prophet." It has been reported that Muslim students beat up a Christian student at Mosul University in response to the fatwa on the same day.

On 6 February, leaflets were distributed in Ramadi, Iraq, by the militant group "The Military Wing for the Army of Justice" demanding that Christians "halt their religious rituals in churches and other worship places because they insulted Islam and Muslims."

==== Pope Benedict XVI Islam controversy ====
The Pope Benedict XVI Islam controversy arose from a lecture delivered on 12 September 2006 by Pope Benedict XVI at the University of Regensburg in Germany. Many Islamic politicians and religious leaders registered protest against what they said was an insulting mischaracterization of Islam, contained in the quotation by the Pope of the following passage:

Show me just what Muhammad brought that was new and there you will find things only evil and inhuman, such as his command to spread by the sword the faith he preached.

After the Pope's comments were known throughout the Arab world, several churches were bombed by insurgent groups. A previously unknown Baghdad-based group, Kataab Ashbal Al-Islam Al-Salafi (Islamic Salafist Boy Scout Battalions) (Note: Ashbāl has been mistranslated in the media as Boy Scout. The Dictionary of Modern Written Arabic defines shibl (plural ashbāl اشبال) as meaning "lion cub; a capable young man, brave youth, young athlete." Compare with Ashbal Saddam (Saddam's Lion Cubs).) threatened to kill all Christians in Iraq if the Pope does not apologize to Muhammad within three days. Christian leaders in Iraq asked their parishioners not to leave their homes, after two Assyrians were stabbed and killed in Baghdad.

There have been reports of writing on Assyrian church doors stating "If the Pope does not apologise, we will bomb all churches, kill more Christians and steal their property and money."

The Iraqi militia Jaish al-Mujahedin (Holy Warriors' Army) announced its intention to "destroy their cross in the heart of Rome… and to hit the Vatican."

Despite the Pope's comments dying down in the media, attacks on Assyrian Christians continued and on 9 October Islamic extremist group kidnapped priest Paulos Iskander in Mosul. Iskander's church as well as several other churches placed 30 large posters around the city to distance themselves from the Pope's words. The relatives of the Christian priest who was beheaded three days later in Mosul, have said that his Muslim captors had demanded his church condemn the pope's recent comments about Islam and pay a $350,000 ransom.

==== Massacres and harassment since 2003 ====
Massacres, ethnic cleansing, and harassment has increased since 2003, according to a 73-page report by the Assyrian International News Agency, released in summer 2007. On 6 January 2008 (the Feast of Epiphany) five Assyrian churches, one Armenian church, and a monastery in Mosul and Baghdad were coordinately attacked with multiple car bombs. Iraqi vice-president Tariq al-Hashimi expressed his "closeness to Christians", whom he called "brothers" in the face of this "attack that changed their joy to sadness and anxiety". Two days later, on 8 January, two more churches were bombed in the city of Kirkuk; the Chaldean Cathedral of Kirkuk and the ACOE Maar Afram Church, wounding three bystanders. Since the start of the Iraq War, there have been at least 46 churches and monasteries bombed.

==== Threats on population ====
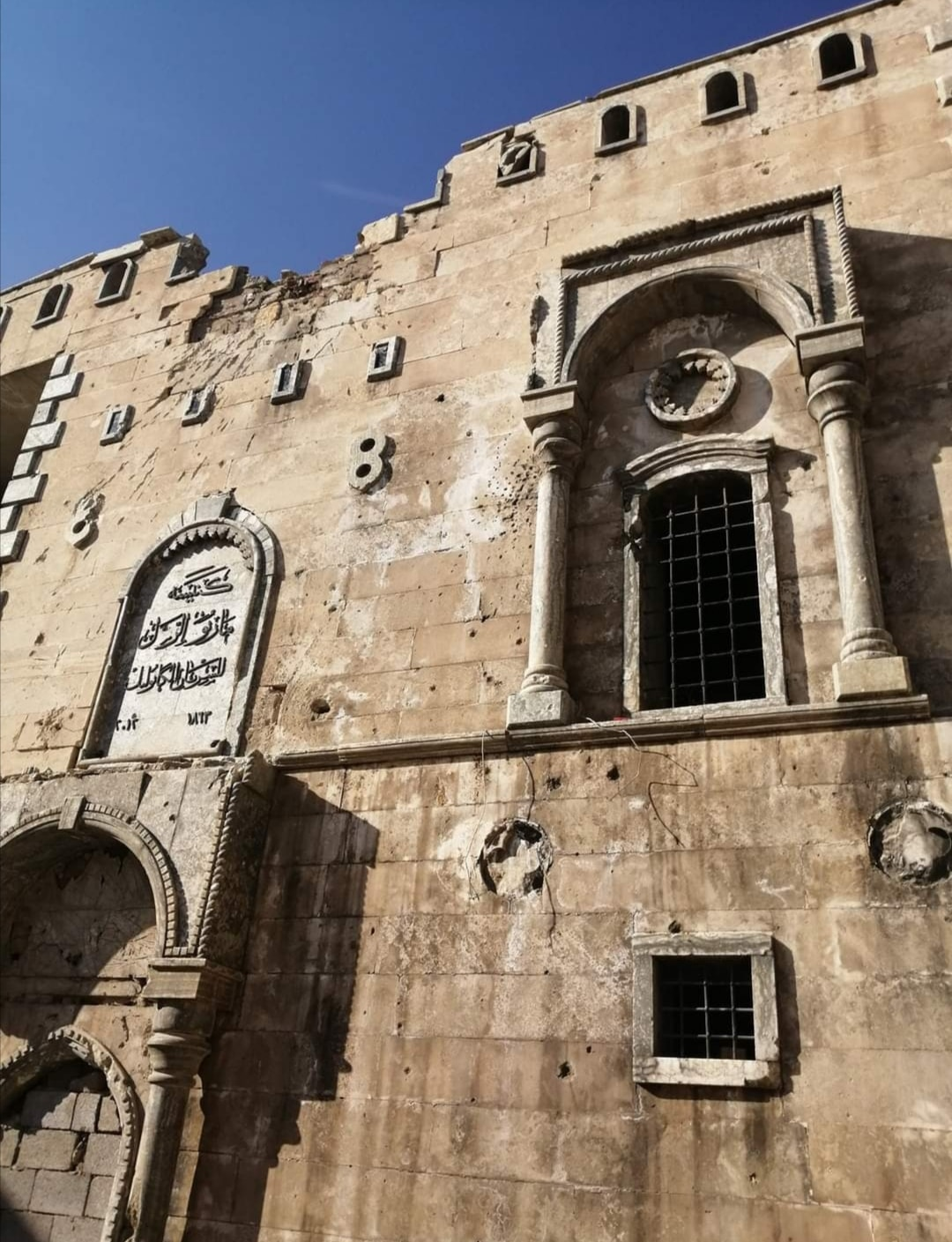
Church of Saint Thomas, Mosul: The church was used as a prison by Islamic State insurgents until the city's liberation in 2017.

Leaders of Iraq's Christian community estimate that over two-thirds of the country's Christian population may have fled the country or been internally displaced since the US-led invasion in 2003. While exact numbers are unknown, reports suggest that whole neighborhoods of Christians have left the cities of Baghdad and Al-Basrah, and that both Sunni and Shiite insurgent groups and militias have threatened Christians.

==== Religious official targets ====
Youssef Adel, a Syriac Orthodox priest with Saint Peter's Church in Baghdad's Karada neighbourhood, was killed by gunmen while travelling in a car on 5 April 2008. On 11 April, President Bush was interviewed by Cliff Kincaid of the EWTN Global Catholic Network; after being informed about the deteriorating situation of the Assyrians; President Bush was quoted as saying "This is a Muslim government that has failed to protect the Christians. In fact, it discriminates against them....It's time to order U.S. troops to protect Christian churches and believers."

== Statistics ==
A 1950 CIA numbers report on Iraq estimated 165,000 Assyrians, most of which were Chaldean Catholic with smaller numbers of the Church of the East and Syriac Catholic and Orthodox churches.

According to a report by the Assyrian Policy Institute Before the war in Iraq, the number of Christians in Iraq was estimated at over 1.5 million.

According to statistics gathered by the Roman Catholic Church when doing censuses of Chaldean Catholic diocese in Iraq in 2012 and 2013, Chaldo-Assyrians in Iraq numbered 230,071 people.

According to varied reports from the years 2015 to 2022, the Assyrian population is estimated to be anywhere between 500,000-600,000 in Iraq.

== See also ==
- Assyrian elections in Iraq
- Assyrian genocide
- Assyrian independence movement
- Christianity in Iraq
- Proposals for Assyrian autonomy in Iraq
- List of Assyrian settlements
- List of Iraqi Assyrians
- Minorities in Iraq
- Simele massacre
- Persecution of Assyrians by the Islamic State

== Sources ==
- Aboona, Hirmis (2008). Assyrians, Kurds, and Ottomans: Intercommunal Relations on the Periphery of the Ottoman Empire. Amherst: Cambria Press. ISBN 978-1-60497-583-3.
- Baarda, Tijmen C. (2020). "Arabic and the Syriac Christians in Iraq: Three Levels of Loyalty to the Arabist Project (1920-1950)". Arabic and its Alternatives: Religious Minorities and their Languages in the Emerging Nation States of the Middle East (1920-1950). Leiden-Boston: Brill. pp. 143–170. doi:10.1163/9789004423220_007. ISBN 978-90-04-38269-5. S2CID 216310663.
- BarAbraham, Abdulmesih (2018). "Safeguarding the Cross: Emergence of Christian Militias in Iraq and Syria". Middle Eastern Christians and Europe: Historical Legacies and Present Challenges. Wien: LIT Verlag. pp. 217–238. ISBN 978-3-643-91023-3.
- Barber, Matthew (2016). "They that Remain: Syrian and Iraqi Christian Communities amid the Syria Conflict and the Rise of the Islamic State". Christianity and Freedom. Vol. 2. New York: Cambridge University Press. pp. 453–488. ISBN 978-1-107-56188-5.
- Dougherty, Beth K. (2019) [2004]. Historical Dictionary of Iraq (3rd ed.). Lanham: Rowman & Littlefield. ISBN 978-1-5381-2005-7.
- Donabed, Sargon G. (2015). Reforging a Forgotten History: Iraq and the Assyrians in the Twentieth Century. Edinburgh: Edinburgh University Press. ISBN 978-0-7486-8605-6.
- Habbi, Joseph (1998). "Christians in Iraq". Christian Communities in the Arab Middle East: The Challenge of the Future. Oxford: Clarendon Press. pp. 294–304. ISBN 978-0-19-829388-0.
- Hunter, Erica C. D. (2019). "Changing Demography: Christians in Iraq since 1991". The Syriac World. London: Routledge. pp. 783–796. ISBN 978-1-138-89901-8.
- Lalik, Krzysztof (2018). "Ethnic and Religious Factors of Chaldo-Assyrian Identity in an Interface with the Kurds in Iraqi Kurdistan". Rediscovering Kurdistan's Cultures and Identities: The Call of the Cricket. Cham: Springer. pp. 213–257. ISBN 978-3-319-93088-6.
- Morony, Michael G. (1974). "Religious Communities in Late Sasanian and Early Muslim Iraq". Journal of the Economic and Social History of the Orient. 17 (2): 113–135. doi:10.2307/3596328. JSTOR 3596328.
- Morony, Michael G. (1984). Iraq After the Muslim Conquest. Princeton, NJ: Princeton University Press. ISBN 978-0-691-05395-0.
- Müller, Hannelore (2018). "Assyrian Christians in Iraq, the League of Nations and Transnational Christian Advocacy (1920s–1940s)". Sayfo 1915: An Anthology of Essays on the Genocide of Assyrians/Arameans during the First World War. Piscataway, NJ: Gorgias Press. pp. 253–304. ISBN 978-1-4632-0730-4.
- Murre van den Berg, Heleen (2009). "Chaldeans and Assyrians: The Church of the East in the Ottoman Period". The Christian Heritage of Iraq. Piscataway: Gorgias Press. pp. 146–164. ISBN 978-1-60724-111-9.
- O'Mahony, Anthony (2009). "Christianity in Iraq: Modern History, Theology, Dialogue and Politics (until 2003)". The Christian Heritage of Iraq. Piscataway, NJ: Gorgias Press. pp. 237–284. ISBN 978-1-60724-111-9.
- Rassam, Suha (2005). Christianity in Iraq: Its Origins and Development to the Present Day. Leominster: Gracewing Publishing. ISBN 978-0-85244-633-1.
- Salloum, Saad (2019). "Minorities in Iraq: National Legal Framework, Political Participation, and the Future of Citizenship Given the Current Changes". Beyond ISIS: History and Future of Religious Minorities in Iraq. London: Transnational Press. pp. 11–32. ISBN 978-1-912997-15-2.
- Schmidinger, Thomas (2019). "Christians in Iraq". Beyond ISIS: History and Future of Religious Minorities in Iraq. London: Transnational Press. pp. 113–124. ISBN 978-1-912997-15-2.
- Teule, Herman G. B. (2009). "The Christian Minorities in Iraq: The Question of Religious and Ethnic Identity". In-Between Spaces: Christian and Muslim Minorities in Transition in Europe and the Middle East. Brussel: Peter Lang. pp. 45–57. ISBN 978-90-5201-565-1.
- Teule, Herman G. B. (2012). "Christians in Iraq: An Analysis of Some Recent Political Developments" (PDF). Der Islam. 88 (1): 179–198. doi:10.1515/islam-2011-0010. hdl:2066/101464. S2CID 156389791.
- Teule, Herman G. B. (2018). "Christians in Iraq: The Transition from Religious to Secular Identity". International Journal of Asian Christianity. 1: 11–24. doi:10.1163/25424246-00101002. S2CID 158309301.
- Youkhana, Emanuel (2019). "Fleeing ISIS: Aramaic-speaking Christians in the Niniveh Plains after ISIS". Beyond ISIS: History and Future of Religious Minorities in Iraq. London: Transnational Press. pp. 125–150. ISBN 978-1-912997-15-2.
- Hooglund, Eric (2008). "The Society and Its Environment" (PDF). In Curtis, Glenn E.; Hooglund, Eric (eds.). Iran: A Country Study. Area Handbook Series. United States Library of Congress, Federal Research Division (5th ed.). Washington, D.C.: United States Government Printing Office. pp. 81–142. ISBN 978-0-8444-1187-3.
