= Gurgis Shlaymun =

Iraqi politician

Deputy Governor of Dahuk
- Appointed by: Dahuk Provincial Council (PC)
- Governor: Tamar Fattah Ramadhan Kuchar

Personal details
- Party: Kurdistan Democratic Party (KDP)

Gurgis Shlaymun is the former Deputy Governor of Iraq's Dahuk province in Iraqi Kurdistan. In April 2014, KRI held provincial elections and a new provincial council was elected and his term has finished. According to a news report in August 2006, Dahuk authorities, to include Deputy Governor Shlaymun's office, failed to investigate reports of Kurdish sabotage of Assyrian farms. He is ethnically Assyrian.
