= Ismail Mohammed (football coach) =

Iraqi football manager (1922–2008)

Personal information
- Date of birth: 1922
- Place of birth: Baghdad, Iraq
- Date of death: 2 January 2008 (aged 85–86)
- Place of death: Baghdad, Iraq
- Position: Midfielder

Senior career*
| Years | Team | Apps | (Gls) |
| 1939–1943 | Al-Ittihad Al-Karkh | | |
| 1943–1946 | Mahad Al-Tarbiya Al-Badniya | | |
| 1946–1948 | Loughborough College | | |

Managerial career
- 1950–1954: Iraq Schoolboys
- 1954–1956: Haris Al-Maliki
- 1956: Nadi Athori
- 1956–1960: Al-Maslaha Naqil Al-Rakab
- 1957: Iraq
- 1963–1965: Al-Maslaha Naqil Al-Rakab
- * Club domestic league appearances and goals

Ismail Mohammed (born 1922 in Baghdad – January 2, 2008) was Iraq’s first national team coach who led the team at the 2nd Pan Arab Games in Beirut in 1957.

== Childhood ==
The young Ismail began playing football using tennis balls which he got from a neighbour in Al-Karkh who was working with the British before he started school. It was at Dar Al-Mualamin Primary in Al-Karkh where he was taught by Egyptian PE teacher Safwat Al-Ameiri. One of his fellow students was Abdul-Ghani Askar, who Ismail still says possesses the strongest shot that he has seen to this day. Ismail played in several school tournaments involving other schools from Baghdad; one game was against the Al-Tahera Primary, where one of Baghdad’s best players Nassir “Chico” Yousef was studying.

Unlike his brother who favoured track and field events, Ismail liked to play football and helped to put together a team of local players which they called Al-Ittihad Al-Karkh (“Karkh United”) his first game was against a British Army team. Ismail scored his first goal in Hilla and his last while he was studying in England, his favourite goal came while he was playing for the Al-Karkh Select team.

== Career ==
After finishing his primary school education, Ismail joined the Physical Training Institute (Mahad Al-Tarbiya Al-Badaniya) which he graduated from in 1944 other notable graduates from the Institute were Muayad Al-Badry and Sami Al-Safar, before he went to England in 1948 to further his sports education until 1949, where he later worked as a cultural commentator in London. It was at the Physical Training Institute that he learnt the art and discipline of sports under English director Mr. Sidebottom. After his return from his studies in England, he coached the Iraq Schoolboys from 1951 to 1954, and Haris Al-Maliki and Al-Maslaha Naqil Al-Rakab from 1956-1965 as well Montakhab Al-Baghdad (Baghdad Select XI) during the 60s.

It was Ismail who discovered a young 16-year-old by the name of Emmanuel Baba playing for school province side Liwa Al-Dulaim in the Iraq school championship in 1950, after seeing him play at the Kashafa stadium, he met the player and asked him his name, he said “Emmanuel”, and having known that the English were always giving people nicknames, Ismail gave the youngster his nickname, telling him “Ammo Baba”. Apart from bringing him to Baghdad to play for the Royal Guards Ammo also played under the coach for the Schoolboys at the Pan-Arab School Championship in 1951 in Cairo and in 1954 in Beirut, as well as in the national side in 1957 at the Pan Arab Games, managing to score 2 goals in 3 games and become the first Iraqi player to be sent-off in an international game. Ismail was also a football commentator with his first match being the 1955 CISM World Championship Qualifier between Egypt and Iraq in Baghdad. He began his first broadcast by saying “Excuse me listeners as I get a pen and paper ready to write the names of the players”, as he knew the listeners were waiting to know which ends the two teams were attacking, he quickly added “The Iraqi team will occupying the goal near to Al-Zahawi Street…”. Ismail became interested in sports commentary while studying in England, where he was an avid listener to English commentator called Rimmer. In early 1955, he got a phone call from Akram Fahmi who said he had spoken to head of broadcasting director Akram Ibrahim, and he had asked him to find a commentator for the game between Egypt and Iraq, Ismail said he would do it. He commentated on his last game in 1963 between Damanhor and Iraq, passing the microphone to Muayad Al-Badry in the last five minutes of the game. Al-Badry was later quoted as saying that those 5 minutes were like five years. He managed Al-Maslaha from 1956 and won a league championship in 1957.

Ismail spent more than 17 years working for the Iraqi National Olympic Committee with four of them as secretary and another four years as treasurer until 1973.
