= Tariq Mohammed Salih =

Iraqi footballer

Personal information
- Full name: Tariq Mohammed Salih Ali
- Date of birth: 1 January 1938
- Place of birth: Baghdad, Iraq
- Date of death: 8 February 1963 (aged 25)
- Place of death: Baghdad, Iraq
- Position: Forward

International career
Years	Team	Apps	(Gls)
1959	Iraq	4	(2)

Tariq Mohammed Salih (Arabic: عادل عبد الله; 1 January 1938 – 8 February 1963) was an Iraqi footballer who played as a forward.

He played four matches and scored two goals for Iraq in the 1960 Olympics qualification against Lebanon.

== Career statistics ==
=== International goals ===
Scores and results list Iraq's goal tally first.

No	Date	Venue	Opponent	Score	Result	Competition
1.	25 November 1959	Baghdad	Lebanon	6–0	8–0	1960 Olympics qualifiers
2.	25 November 1959	Baghdad	Lebanon	8–0	8–0	1960 Olympics qualifiers
