= Fadhil Abdul-Majid =

Iraqi footballer (born 1935)

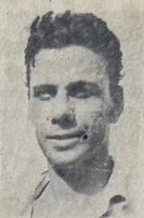

Personal information
- Full name: Fadhil Abdul-Majid Ridha
- Date of birth: 1 July 1935 (age 91)
- Position: Forward

International career
Years	Team	Apps	(Gls)
1957	Iraq		(1)

Fadhil Abdul-Majid Ridha (Arabic: فَاضِل عَبْد الْمَجِيد رِضَا; born 1 July 1935) is an Iraqi former football forward who played for Iraq in the 1957 Pan Arab Games. He scored a goal against Libya.

== Career statistics ==
=== International goals ===
Scores and results list Iraq's goal tally first.

No	Date	Venue	Opponent	Score	Result	Competition
1.	23 October 1957	National Stadium, Tehran	Libya	3–1	3–1	1957 Pan Arab Games
