= Edison David =

Iraqi-Assyrian footballer (05/12/1933–07/24/2020)

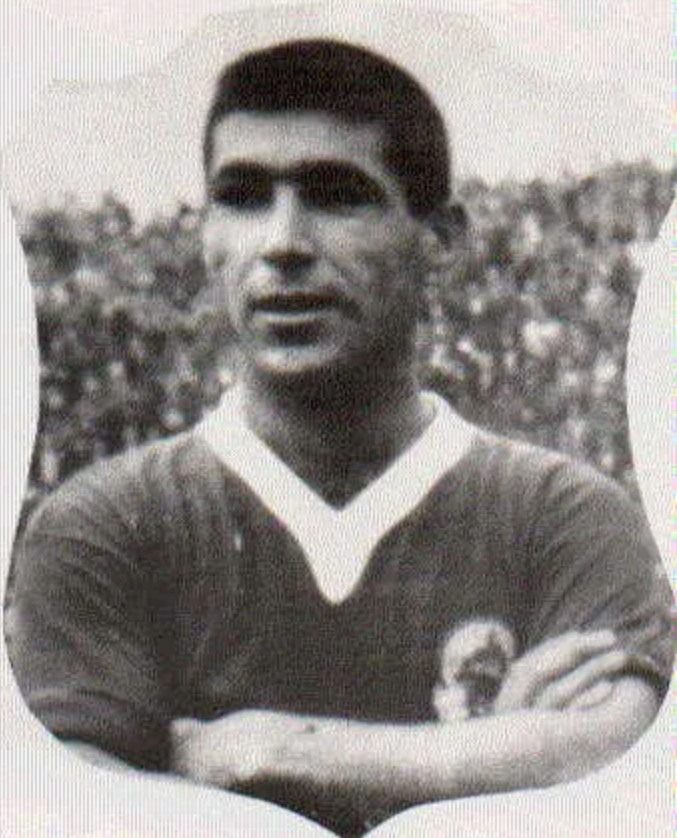

Personal information
- Full name: Edison Eshay David
- Date of birth: 5 December 1933
- Place of birth: Iraq
- Date of death: 24 July 2020 (aged 86)
- Place of death: Modesto, California, United States
- Height: 1.70 m (5 ft 7 in)

Senior career*
Years	Team	Apps	(Gls)
1955–1965	Al-Quwa Al-Jawiya		(7)

International career
1955–1965	Iraq	97	(10)

Managerial career
- 1974–1976: Al-Quwa Al-Jawiya
- * Club domestic league appearances and goals

Edison Eshay David (Syriac: ܖܕܥܣܧܢ ܖܣܗܐܝ ܕܐܘܥܕ; 5 December 1933 – 24 July 2020) was an Iraqi football player who played for the Iraq national team and Al-Quwa Al-Jawiya in the 1950s and 1960s. Born in Iraq, David was of Assyrian descent.

== Career ==
After starting his soccer career at his early teens with local teams, he joined the Iraqi Air Force Club in 1955. He was selected for the Iraq national football team in 1955 where he played until 1965.

During his years with the Iraqi National teams and the Air Force team, he stood out as one of the best players of his time as he was honoured by the central Iraqi League as the best player in 1958.

He was appointed the Head Coach of the Assyrian which is based in North America. From 1986 to 2011 David ran "Eddie David Soccer Camps" in which he trained and inspired children from ages 4–15 to play soccer and become better people.

== Personality and Degrees ==
He was characterized as a patient, swift, strategic planner as he rose to the peak alongside players like Youra Eshaya and Ammo Samson. After moving to the United States, he took on many coaching positions for his great experience and honourable coaching certificate from East Germany.

== Sports medicine Germany ==
=== 1973 student of the year, sports medicine, Germany ===
- Iraqi League Player of the year 1958.
