= Aram Karam =

Iraqi footballer (1929–2023)

Personal information
- Date of birth: 1 July 1929
- Place of birth: Baghdad, Iraq
- Date of death: 2 April 2023 (aged 93)
- Place of death: Turlock, California, U.S.
- Position: Forward

Senior career*
Years	Team	Apps	(Gls)
1943–1945	Arsenal SC Habbaniya		
1945–1947	C.C. Team		
1947–1951	RAF Levy Civilian		
1951–1952	RAF Employees’ (Assyrian) Club		
1952–1960	Sharakat Nafat Al-Iraq (IPC)		

International career
1951	Iraq		
- * Club domestic league appearances and goals

Aram Karam (Arabic: آرَام كَرَم; 1 July 1929 – 2 April 2023) was an Iraqi footballer, who earned a reputation for scoring goals from apparently impossible long-range situations. He was an ethnic Assyrian and Christian.

Karam was a son of a Levy soldier from Habbaniya. Aram was a striker capable of having the ball in the back of the net within a blink of an eye. After playing for various teams on RAF Hinaidi in Baghdad from 1936 in his youth, he joined Arsenal Sports Club Habbaniya in 1943 and later played for the C.C. Team and founded RAF Levy Civilian of Habbaniya.

In 1951, Aram was one of 16 players to be selected to play for Iraq’s first ever national team. He missed Iraq’s first international game against Turkey in Izmir on 6 May, which ended 7–0 to the hosts, but competed in the second game six days later against Ankara Select. Aram proved to be a valuable player on the day as he scored Iraq’s first goal and ended the game with a hat-trick but was unable to prevent a 7–5 defeat.

The next year, he joined Sharakat Nafat Al-Iraq in Kirkuk. Aram was not only the captain of the team but also the head coach. In 1954, the team won the Northern Iraqi Championship and also won 6 consecutive Middle East Oil Companies Championships under his leadership. In 1960 Aram retired and became head of sports at the club while also helping the Iraqi national team.

Aside from football, the forward also won six consecutive tennis titles in the Persian Gulf Tennis Championships.

Karam emigrated to the United States in 1992, and resided in Turlock, California. He died there on 2 April 2023, at the age of 93.
