= Mohammed Najim =

Iraqi association football player

Personal information
- Full name: Mohammed Najim Shaita
- Position: Forward

International career
Years	Team	Apps	(Gls)
1965–1966	Iraq	3	(1)

Mohammed Najim is a former Iraqi football forward who played for Iraq between 1965 and 1966. He played in the 1966 Arab Nations Cup and scored in the famous 10–1 win against Bahrain.
