= Shamil Tabra =

Iraqi association football player

Personal information
- Full name: Shamil Tabra
- Position: Forward

International career
Years	Team	Apps	(Gls)
1962–1964	Iraq	3	(1)

Shamil Tabra is a former Iraqi football forward who played for Iraq between 1962 and 1964. He played 3 matches and scored 1 goal against Lebanon in the 1964 Arab Nations Cup.

== Career statistics ==
=== International goals ===
Scores and results list Iraq's goal tally first.

No	Date	Venue	Opponent	Score	Result	Competition
1.	16 November 1964	National Stadium, Kuwait City	Lebanon	1–0	1–0	1964 Arab Nations Cup
