= Fakhri Mohammed Salman =

Iraqi association football player

Personal information
- Full name: Fakhri Mohammed Salman
- Position: Forward

International career
Years	Team	Apps	(Gls)
1957–1959	Iraq		(1)

Fakhri Mohammed Salman is an Iraqi former football forward who played for Iraq between 1957 and 1959. He scored a goal in the first international match of Iraq, against Morocco in the 1957 Pan Arab Games.

== Career statistics ==
=== International goals ===
Scores and results list Iraq's goal tally first.

No	Date	Venue	Opponent	Score	Result	Competition
1.	19 October 1957	National Stadium, Beirut	Morocco	3–3	3–3	1957 Pan Arab Games
