= Youra Eshaya =

Iraqi footballer (1933–1992)

Personal information
- Full name: Youra Eshaya Pera
- Date of birth: 1 January 1933
- Date of death: 21 July 1992 (aged 59)
- Position: Forward

International career
Years	Team	Apps	(Gls)
1957–1964	Iraq		(2)

Youra Eshaya Pera (Syriac: ܝܘܪܐ ܐܫܥܝܐ, Arabic: يورا أيشايا; 1 January 1933 – 21 July 1992) was an Assyrian and Iraqi football player who was the first Iraqi player ever to play in England.

== Early life ==
He was born in 1933 in Iraq to Eshaya Pera and Batishwa Benyamin. His family moved to Baghdad to live at the Royal Air Force Station Hinaidi in 1935, where Youra's father worked for the Royal Air Force (RAF). In 1937, the family was transferred to Habbaniya along with the rest of the Hinaidi Assyrian and Armenian civilians and the Assyrian levies employed by the Royal Air Force.

== Football career ==
At the age of 15, Youra started to play Levy Civilian in the RAF Football League in Habbaniya. He was soon promoted to the senior team for the 1949/50 season.

In April 1953, Flight Lieutenant R. K. Weston, a talent-scout for Bristol Rovers spotted him and recommended him to Bert Tann the Bristol Rovers manager at that time. Youra arrived in England on in August 1954. Since he only got a one-month work permit in England, he had to appeal twice to extend his work permit. He finally worked as a miner in order to stay in England while playing as an amateur for Bristol Rovers 3rd team in the Western League. He was granted employment by the National Coal Board and he started working as a miner at Pensford Colliery, Somerset, on November 7, 1954.

Youra played only four games in his second season before the president of the Royal Iraqi Air Force FC, Brigadier Kadhim Abbadi, invited him back to Iraq. He was offered an Iraqi citizenship and a place for him on the Force as a warrant officer provided he play for his club and returned to Baghdad in December 1955.

== Career statistics ==
=== International goals ===
Scores and results list Iraq's goal tally first.

No	Date	Venue	Opponent	Score	Result	Competition
1.	19 October 1957	Beirut	Morocco	2–3	3–3	1957 Pan Arab Games
2.	23 October 1957	Beirut	Libya	2–1	3–1	1957 Pan Arab Games

== Retirement ==
He was forced to retire in 1971 after he married a Swedish woman because the Baathist Government prohibited military personnel from marrying women from non-Arab countries. He was later transferred to Habbaniya air base where he coached and trained military sportsmen. He moved to Sweden where he worked as a youth soccer coach. He died on July 21, 1992, at the age of 59.
