= FIFA Arab Cup records and statistics =

This is a list of records and statistics of the FIFA Arab Cup.

== Debut of national teams ==
| Year | Debuting teams | | | Successor teams |
| Year | Teams | No. | Cum. | Successor teams |
|---|---|---|---|---|
| 1963 | Jordan, Kuwait, Lebanon, Syria, Tunisia | 5 | 5 | |
| 1964 | Iraq, Libya | 2 | 7 | |
| 1966 | Bahrain, North Yemen, Oman, Palestine | 4 | 11 | |
| 1985 | Mauritania, Qatar, Saudi Arabia | 3 | 14 | |
| 1988 | Algeria | 1 | 15 | |
| 1992 | Egypt | 1 | 16 | |
| 1998 | Morocco, Sudan, United Arab Emirates | 3 | 19 | |
| 2002 | None | 0 | 19 | |
| 2012 | None | 0 | 19 | |
| 2021 | None | 0 | 19 | |
| 2025 | Comoros | 1 | 20 | |

=== Teams yet to qualify for finals ===
Three teams have participated in qualifying and are yet to qualify for the final tournament:

- Djibouti
- Somalia

=== Teams invited for Arab Cup ===
- South Sudan - only qualifications in 2025

== Overall team records ==
In this ranking 3 points are awarded for a win, 1 for a draw and 0 for a loss. As per statistical convention in football, matches decided in extra time are counted as wins and losses, while matches decided by penalty shoot-outs are counted as draws. Teams are ranked by total points, then by goal difference, then by goals scored.

As of 2025 FIFA Arab Cup

| Rank | Team | Part | Pld | W | D | L | GF | GA | GD | Pts |
|---|---|---|---|---|---|---|---|---|---|---|
| 1 | Iraq | 7 | 32 | 18 | 10 | 4 | 51 | 24 | +27 | 64 |
| 2 | Saudi Arabia | 8 | 34 | 16 | 8 | 10 | 51 | 31 | +20 | 56 |
| 3 | Jordan | 10 | 42 | 14 | 7 | 21 | 49 | 78 | –29 | 55 |
| 4 | Morocco | 5 | 22 | 14 | 5 | 3 | 40 | 15 | +25 | 47 |
| 5 | Syria | 8 | 32 | 12 | 9 | 11 | 46 | 32 | +14 | 45 |
| 6 | Kuwait | 9 | 33 | 11 | 6 | 16 | 52 | 58 | –6 | 39 |
| 7 | Egypt | 6 | 24 | 8 | 11 | 5 | 29 | 20 | +9 | 35 |
| 8 | Lebanon | 8 | 30 | 9 | 7 | 14 | 38 | 42 | –4 | 34 |
| 9 | Tunisia | 4 | 17 | 9 | 4 | 4 | 28 | 14 | +14 | 31 |
| 10 | Algeria | 4 | 16 | 7 | 7 | 2 | 24 | 12 | +12 | 28 |
| 11 | Qatar | 4 | 17 | 8 | 4 | 5 | 23 | 15 | +8 | 28 |
| 12 | Libya | 4 | 16 | 7 | 6 | 3 | 39 | 16 | +23 | 27 |
| 13 | Bahrain | 7 | 27 | 5 | 8 | 14 | 27 | 56 | –29 | 23 |
| 14 | Palestine | 7 | 18 | 2 | 9 | 7 | 24 | 32 | –8 | 15 |
| 15 | United Arab Emirates | 3 | 13 | 4 | 2 | 7 | 15 | 23 | –8 | 14 |
| 16 | Sudan | 6 | 15 | 3 | 4 | 8 | 12 | 27 | –15 | 13 |
| 17 | Oman | 3 | 10 | 2 | 2 | 6 | 10 | 32 | –22 | 8 |
| 18 | Yemen (Note: Includes participations as North Yemen between 1967 and 1990) | 3 | 10 | 1 | 1 | 8 | 8 | 47 | –39 | 4 |
| 19 | Mauritania | 2 | 5 | 1 | 0 | 4 | 3 | 11 | –8 | 3 |
| 20 | Comoros | 1 | 3 | 0 | 0 | 3 | 3 | 8 | –5 | 0 |

== Medal table ==
- Jordan and Morocco shared bronze in 2002.
- Saudi Arabia and the United Arab Emirates shared bronze in 2025.

| Rank | Nation | Gold | Silver | Bronze | Total |
|---|---|---|---|---|---|
| 1 | Iraq | 4 | 0 | 1 | 5 |
| 2 | Saudi Arabia | 2 | 1 | 2 | 5 |
| 3 | Morocco | 2 | 0 | 1 | 3 |
| 4 | Tunisia | 1 | 1 | 0 | 2 |
| 5 | Egypt | 1 | 0 | 1 | 2 |
| 6 | Algeria | 1 | 0 | 0 | 1 |
| 7 | Syria | 0 | 3 | 0 | 3 |
| 8 | Libya | 0 | 2 | 1 | 3 |
| 9 | Bahrain | 0 | 2 | 0 | 2 |
| 10 | Jordan | 0 | 1 | 1 | 2 |
| 10 | Qatar | 0 | 1 | 1 | 2 |
| 12 | Kuwait | 0 | 0 | 2 | 2 |
| 12 | Lebanon | 0 | 0 | 2 | 2 |
| 14 | United Arab Emirates | 0 | 0 | 1 | 1 |
| Totals (14 entries) | | 11 | 11 | 13 | 35 |

== Comprehensive team results by tournament ==
Legend

- 1st – Champions
- 2nd – Runners-up
- 3rd – Third place
- 4th – Fourth place
- QF – Quarter-finals
- GS – Group stage
- Q — Qualified for upcoming tournament
- • — Did not qualify
- × — Did not participate
- — Hosts

For each tournament, the number of teams in each finals tournament are shown (in parentheses).

| Team | 1963 (Lebanon) (5) | 1964 (Kuwait) (5) | 1966 (Iraq) (10) | 1985 (Saudi Arabia) (6) | 1988 (Jordan) (10) | 1992 (Syria) (6) | 1998 (Qatar) (12) | 2002 (Kuwait) (10) | 2012 (Saudi Arabia) (11) | 2021 (Qatar) (16) | 2025 (Qatar) (16) | 2029 (Qatar) (16) | Total |
|---|---|---|---|---|---|---|---|---|---|---|---|---|---|
| Algeria | × | × | × | × | GS | × | GS | × | × | 1st | QF | | 4 |
| Bahrain | × | × | GS | 2nd | GS | × | × | 2nd | GS | GS | GS | | 7 |
| Comoros | | | | × | × | × | × | × | × | • | GS | | 1 |
| Egypt | × | × | × | × | 3rd | 1st | GS | × | GS | 4th | GS | | 6 |
| Iraq | × | 1st | 1st | 1st | 1st | × | × | × | 3rd | GS | QF | | 7 |
| Jordan | GS | GS | GS | GS | 4th | GS | GS | 3rd | × | QF | 2nd | | 10 |
| Kuwait | 4th | 4th | GS | × | GS | 3rd | 3rd | GS | GS | • | GS | | 9 |
| Lebanon | 3rd | 3rd | 4th | × | GS | × | GS | GS | GS | GS | • | | 8 |
| Libya | × | 2nd | 3rd | × | × | × | GS | × | 2nd | • | • | | 4 |
| Mauritania | × | × | × | GS | • | × | × | × | × | GS | • | | 2 |
| Morocco | × | × | × | × | × | × | GS | 3rd | 1st | QF | 1st | | 5 |
| Oman | × | × | GS | × | × | × | × | × | × | QF | GS | | 3 |
| Palestine | × | × | GS | × | × | GS | • | GS | GS | GS | QF | | 6 |
| Qatar | × | × | × | 4th | × | × | 2nd | × | × | 3rd | GS | Q | 5 |
| Saudi Arabia | × | × | × | 3rd | GS | 2nd | 1st | 1st | 4th | GS | 3rd | | 8 |
| Sudan | × | × | × | • | × | × | GS | GS | GS | GS | GS | | 5 |
| Syria | 2nd | × | 2nd | × | 2nd | 4th | GS | GS | × | GS | QF | | 8 |
| Tunisia | 1st | × | × | × | GS | × | × | × | × | 2nd | GS | | 4 |
| United Arab Emirates | × | × | × | × | × | × | 4th | × | × | QF | 3rd | | 3 |
| Yemen | × | × | GS | × | × | × | × | GS | GS | • | • | | 3 |

== Results of host nations ==
| Year | Host nation | Finish |
|---|---|---|
| 1963 | Lebanon | Third place |
| 1964 | Kuwait | Fourth place |
| 1966 | Iraq | Champions |
| 1985 | Saudi Arabia | Third place |
| 1988 | Jordan | Fourth place |
| 1992 | Syria | Fourth place |
| 1998 | Qatar | Runners-up |
| 2002 | Kuwait | Group stage |
| 2012 | Saudi Arabia | Fourth place |
| 2021 | Qatar | Third place |
| 2025 | Qatar | Group stage |

== Results of defending champions ==
| Year | Defending champions | Finish |
|---|---|---|
| 1964 | Tunisia | Did not participate |
| 1966 | Iraq | Champions |
| 1985 | Iraq | Champions |
| 1988 | Iraq | Champions |
| 1992 | Iraq | Banned due to Gulf War |
| 1998 | Egypt | Group stage |
| 2002 | Saudi Arabia | Champions |
| 2012 | Saudi Arabia | Fourth place |
| 2021 | Morocco | Quarter final |
| 2025 | Algeria | Quarter final |

== Results by confederation ==
Total times teams qualified by confederation
| Confederation | AFC | CAF | Total |
|---|---|---|---|
| Teams | 76 | 31 | 107 |
| Top 4 | 32 | 12 | 44 |
| Top 2 | 14 | 8 | 22 |
| 1st | 6 | 5 | 11 |
| 2nd | 8 | 3 | 11 |
| 3rd | 9 | 2 | 11 |
| 4th | 8 | 1 | 9 |
| Semi-finals | 1 | 1 | 2 |

Champions by confederation
| Confederation (continent) | Champion(s) | Titles |
|---|---|---|
| AFC (Asia) | Iraq (4), Saudi Arabia (2) | 6 |
| CAF (Africa) | Morocco (2), Algeria (1), Egypt (1), Tunisia (1) | 5 |

== General statistics by tournament ==
| Year | Hosts | Champions | Winning coach | Top scorer(s) (goals) | Best player(s) | Best goalkeeper |
|---|---|---|---|---|---|---|
| 1963 | Lebanon | Tunisia | (France) André Gérard | (Lebanon) Levon Altounian (6) | | |
| 1964 | Kuwait | Iraq | (Iraq) Adil Basher | (Libya) Ahmed Ben Soueid (4) | | |
| 1966 | Iraq | Iraq | (Iraq) Adil Basher | (Libya) Ali Al-Biski (10) | (Iraq) Shidrak Yousif | |
| 1985 | Saudi Arabia | Iraq | (Iraq) Anwar Jassam | (Iraq) Anad Abid (5) | (Saudi Arabia) Mohamed Abd Al-Jawad | (Bahrain) Mohammed Saleh |
| 1988 | Jordan | Iraq | (Iraq) Ammo Baba | (Iraq) Ahmed Radhi (4) | (Jordan) Tawfiq Al-Saheb | |
| 1992 | Syria | Egypt | (Egypt) Mahmoud El-Gohary | (Egypt) Ayman Mansour (2) (Saudi Arabia) Saeed Al-Owairan (2) (Kuwait) Waleed Al-Felaij (2) | | |
| 1998 | Qatar | Saudi Arabia | (Germany) Otto Pfister | (Saudi Arabia) Obeid Al-Dosari (8) | (Kuwait) Bader Haji (Qatar) Mubarak Mustafa | (Saudi Arabia) Mohamed Al-Deayea |
| 2002 | Kuwait | Saudi Arabia | (Netherlands) Gerard van der Lem | (Bahrain) Ahmed Hassan (4) (Syria) Mohammad Rafe (4) | (Saudi Arabia) Mohammed Noor | (Saudi Arabia) Mabrouk Zaid |
| 2012 | Saudi Arabia | Morocco | (Belgium) Eric Gerets | (Morocco) Yassine Salhi (6) | (Morocco) Yassine Salhi | |
| 2021 | Qatar | Algeria | (Algeria) Madjid Bougherra | (Tunisia) Seifeddine Jaziri (4) | (Algeria) Yacine Brahimi | (Algeria) Raïs M'Bolhi |
| 2025 | Qatar | Morocco | (Morocco) Tarik Sektioui | (Jordan) Ali Olwan (6) | (Morocco) Mohamed Rabie Hrimat | (Morocco) Mehdi Benabid |

== Team tournament position ==
Most finishes in the top three
5, Iraq & Saudi Arabia
Most finishes in the top four
6, Saudi Arabia (1985, 1992, 1998, 2002, 2012, 2025)
Most Cup appearances
10, Jordan (1963, 1964, 1966, 1985, 1988, 1992, 1998, 2002, 2021, 2025)

=== Consecutive ===
Most consecutive championships
4, Iraq (1964–1988)
Most consecutive finishes in the top two
4, Iraq (1964–1988)
Most consecutive finishes in the top four
4, Iraq (1964–1988); Saudi Arabia (1992–2012)
Most consecutive finals tournaments
8, Jordan (1963–2002); Saudi Arabia (1985–2025)
Most consecutive championships by a confederation
4, AFC (1964–1988)

=== Gaps ===
Longest gap between successive titles
13 years, Morocco (2012–2025)
Longest gap between successive appearances in the top two
22 years, Syria (1966–1988)

=== Host team ===
Best finish by host team
Champion, Iraq (1966)

=== Defending champion ===
Best finish by defending champion
Champion, Iraq (1966, 1985, 1988)

=== Debuting teams ===
Best finish by a debuting team
Champion, Tunisia (1963), Iraq (1964)

=== Other ===
Most finishes in the top two without ever being champion
3, Syria (1963, 1966, 1988)
Most finishes in the top four without ever being champion
4, Syria (1963, 1966, 1988, 1992); Kuwait (1963, 1964, 1992, 1998)
Most appearances in Finals without ever being champion
10, Jordan (1963, 1964, 1966, 1985, 1988, 1992, 1998, 2002, 2021, 2025)
Most finishes in the top four without ever finishing in the top two
4, Kuwait (1963, 1964, 1992, 1998)
Most appearances in Finals without ever finishing in the top two
9, Kuwait (1963, 1964, 1966, 1988, 1992, 1998, 2002, 2012, 2025)

== Most tournaments hosted ==
All tournaments were played in Asia.

| No. of times hosted | Nation | Year(s) |
|---|---|---|
| 4 | Qatar | 1998, 2021, 2025, 2029 |
| 2 | Kuwait | 1964, 2002 |
| 2 | Saudi Arabia | 1985, 2012 |
| 1 | Lebanon | 1963 |
| 1 | Iraq | 1966 |
| 1 | Jordan | 1988 |
| 1 | Syria | 1992 |
