= National team appearances in the FIFA World Cup =

International football delegations

A map showing all nations to have competed in FIFA World Cup tournaments.

A map showing the best performance of each team to have competed in FIFA World Cup tournaments.

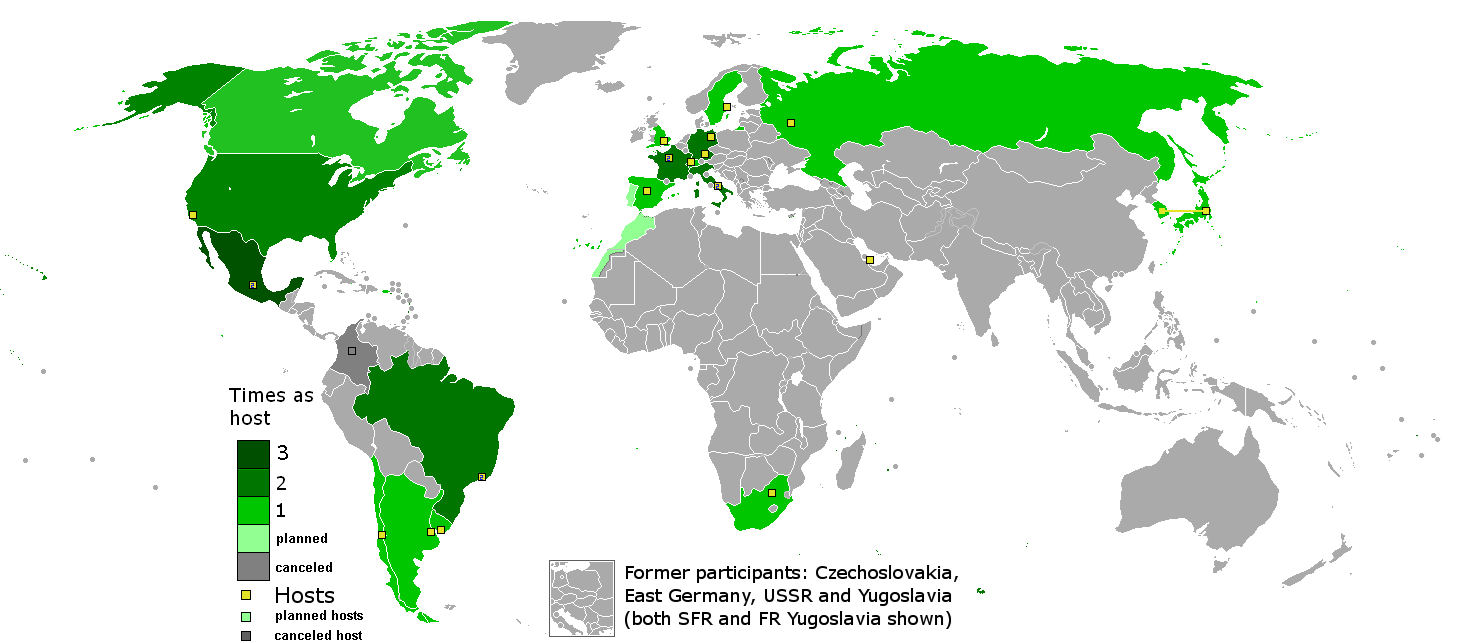
A map showing all nations that have hosted a FIFA World Cup tournament and how many times they have done so.

This article lists the performances of each of the national teams which have made at least one appearance in the FIFA World Cup.

As of the 2026 FIFA World Cup, 84 national teams have competed at the final tournaments. Brazil is the only team to have appeared in all 23 tournaments up to the 2026 edition, with Germany having participated in 21, Argentina in 19, and Italy and Mexico in 18. To date, eight nations have won the tournament. The inaugural winners in 1930 were Uruguay; the current champions are Spain. The most successful nation in the competition are currently Brazil, who have won the cup on five occasions. Five teams have appeared in FIFA World Cup finals without winning, while twelve more have appeared in semi-finals.

== Ranking of teams by number of appearances ==
As of 2026 FIFA World Cup

Team	Appearances	Record streak	Active streak	Debut	Most recent qualification	Best result
Brazil	23	23	23	1930	2026	Champions (1958, 1962, 1970, 1994, 2002)
Germany (Note: Germany, officially the Federal Republic of Germany since 1949, has been represented by the same governing body, the Deutscher Fußball-Bund (DFB), since 1904. Following World War II and the division of Germany, the DFB was re-admitted to FIFA after the 1950 World Cup as West Germany. Saar competed in the 1954 World Cup qualifying before joining West Germany in 1956. East Germany fielded teams of their own from 1958 to 1990 before joining with West Germany and the DFB during the German reunification. FIFA officially attributes all international results of the DFB team since 1908 to Germany, including the results of West Germany from 1954–1990.)	21	19	19	1934	2026	Champions (1954, 1974, (Note: Host of the tournament.) 1990, 2014)
Argentina	19	14	14	1930	2026	Champions (1978, 1986, 2022)
Italy	18	14	0	1934	2014	Champions (1934, 1938, 1982, 2006)
Mexico	18	9	9	1930	2026	Quarter-finals (1970, 1986)
Spain	17	13	13	1934	2026	Champions (2010, 2026)
England	17	8	8	1950	2026	Champions (1966)
France	17	8	8	1930	2026	Champions (1998, 2018)
Belgium	15	6	4	1930	2026	Third place (2018)
Uruguay	15	5	5	1930	2026	Champions (1930, 1950)
Switzerland	13	6	6	1934	2026	Quarter-finals (1934, 1938, 1954, 2026)
Sweden	13	3	1	1934	2026	Runners-up (1958)
Serbia (Note: The Yugoslavia national football team qualified eight times during eras of the Kingdom of Yugoslavia (1930) and the Socialist Federal Republic of Yugoslavia (1950–1990). They qualified from 1930–1990 under the name Yugoslavia prior to its breakup in 1992 by the secession of many of its constituent republics. They qualified once in 1998 as the Federal Republic of Yugoslavia, then changed its name to Serbia and Montenegro in 2003, only qualifying under that name in 2006. All of these teams are considered the predecessors of the current Serbia team by FIFA, which first qualified under that name in 2010. The other national teams which resulted from the breakup of the SFR Yugoslavia in 1992 — Croatia, Slovenia, Bosnia and Herzegovina and North Macedonia — are considered distinct entities from the Yugoslavia team of 1930–1990. Montenegro now also competes separately after independence in 2006 and Kosovo was recognized by FIFA in 2016.)	13	4	0	1930	2022	Fourth place (1930, 1962)
South Korea	12	11	11	1954	2026	Fourth place (2002 (Note: Co-host of the tournament.))
United States	12	7	2	1930	2026	Third place (1930)
Netherlands	12	3	2	1934	2026	Runners-up (1974, 1978, 2010)
Russia (Note: The Soviet Union qualified seven times prior to its dissolution in 1991. The 15 nations that were former Soviet republics now compete separately. FIFA considers Russia as the successor team of the Soviet Union.)	11	4	0	1958	2018	Fourth place (1966)
Czech Republic (Note: Czechoslovakia qualified eight times prior to being divided into Slovakia and the Czech Republic in 1993. FIFA considers both the Czech Republic and Slovakia as the joint successor teams of Czechoslovakia. The Czech Republic national team qualified for the World Cup for the first time as a separate nation in 2006, with Slovakia doing the same in 2010.)	10	3	1	1934	2026	Runners-up (1934, 1962)
Portugal	9	7	7	1966	2026	Third place (1966)
Scotland	9	5	1	1954	2026	Group stage
Paraguay	9	4	1	1930	2026	Quarter-finals (2010)
Hungary	9	4	0	1934	1986	Runners-up (1938, 1954)
Poland	9	4	0	1938	2022	Third place (1974, 1982)
Slovakia	9	3	0	1934	2010	Runners-up (1934, 1962)
Chile	9	2	0	1930	2014	Third place (1962)
Japan	8	8	8	1998	2026	Round of 16 (2002, 2010, 2018, 2022)
Cameroon	8	4	0	1982	2022	Quarter-finals (1990)
Austria	8	2	1	1934	2026	Third place (1954)
Australia	7	6	6	1974	2026	Round of 16 (2006, 2022)
Croatia	7	4	4	1998	2026	Runners-up (2018)
Iran	7	4	4	1978	2026	Group stage
Saudi Arabia	7	4	3	1994	2026	Round of 16 (1994)
Bulgaria	7	4	0	1962	1998	Fourth place (1994)
Morocco	7	3	3	1970	2026	Fourth place (2022)
Tunisia	7	3	3	1978	2026	Group stage
Colombia	7	3	1	1962	2026	Quarter-finals (2014)
Romania	7	3	0	1930	1998	Quarter-finals (1994)
Costa Rica	6	3	0	1990	2022	Quarter-finals (2014)
Nigeria	6	3	0	1994	2018	Round of 16 (1994, 1998, 2014)
Denmark	6	2	0	1986	2022	Quarter-finals (1998)
Ghana	5	3	2	2006	2026	Quarter-finals (2010)
Ecuador	5	2	2	2002	2026	Round of 16 (2006)
Algeria	5	2	1	1982	2026	Round of 16 (2014)
Peru	5	2	0	1930	2018	Quarter-finals (1970, 1978)
Senegal	4	3	3	2002	2026	Quarter-finals (2002)
Ivory Coast	4	3	1	2006	2026	Round of 32 (2026)
Norway	4	2	1	1938	2026	Quarter-finals (2026)
South Africa	4	2	1	1998	2026	Round of 32 (2026)
Egypt	4	1	1	1934	2026	Round of 16 (2026)
Canada	3	2	2	1986	2026	Round of 16 (2026)
Northern Ireland	3	2	0	1958	1986	Quarter-finals (1958)
Honduras	3	2	0	1982	2014	Group stage
Republic of Ireland	3	2	0	1990	2002	Quarter-finals (1990)
Greece	3	2	0	1994	2014	Round of 16 (2014)
Turkey	3	1	1	1954	2026	Third place (2002)
New Zealand	3	1	1	1982	2026	Group stage
Bolivia	3	1	0	1930	1994	Group stage
Qatar	2	2	2	2022	2026	Group stage
DR Congo (Note: The Democratic Republic of the Congo competed as Zaire in 1974.)	2	1	1	1974	2026	Round of 32 (2026)
Bosnia and Herzegovina	2	1	1	2014	2026	Round of 32 (2026)
Haiti	2	1	1	1974	2026	Group stage
Iraq	2	1	1	1986	2026	Group stage
Panama	2	1	1	2018	2026	Group stage
Wales	2	1	0	1958	2022	Quarter-finals (1958)
North Korea	2	1	0	1966	2010	Quarter-finals (1966)
El Salvador	2	1	0	1970	1982	Group stage
Slovenia	2	1	0	2002	2010	Group stage
Cape Verde	1	1	1	2026	2026	Round of 32 (2026)
Curaçao	1	1	1	2026	2026	Group stage
Jordan	1	1	1	2026	2026	Group stage
Uzbekistan	1	1	1	2026	2026	Group stage
Cuba	1	1	0	1938	1938	Quarter-finals (1938)
Indonesia (Note: Indonesia competed as the Dutch East Indies in 1938.)	1	1	0	1938	1938	Round of 16 (1938)
Israel	1	1	0	1970	1970	Group stage
East Germany	1	1	—N/a	1974	1974	Quarter-finals (Note: Last 8 held as second group stage.) (1974)
Kuwait	1	1	0	1982	1982	Group stage
United Arab Emirates	1	1	0	1990	1990	Group stage
Jamaica	1	1	0	1998	1998	Group stage
China	1	1	0	2002	2002	Group stage
Angola	1	1	0	2006	2006	Group stage
Togo	1	1	0	2006	2006	Group stage
Trinidad and Tobago	1	1	0	2006	2006	Group stage
Ukraine	1	1	0	2006	2006	Quarter-finals (2006)
Iceland	1	1	0	2018	2018	Group stage

== Debut of national teams ==
Each successive World Cup has had at least one team appearing for the first time. Using FIFA's view on successor teams, the total number of teams that have participated in the World Cup up to and including the 2026 edition is 84.

Year	Debuting teams			Successor and renamed teams
Year	Teams	No.	Cum.	Successor and renamed teams
1930	Argentina, Belgium, Bolivia, Brazil, Chile, France, Mexico, Paraguay, Peru, Romania, United States, Uruguay, Yugoslavia	13	13	
1934	Austria, Czechoslovakia, Egypt, Germany, Hungary, Italy, Netherlands, Spain, Sweden, Switzerland	10	23	
1938	Cuba, Dutch East Indies, Norway, Poland	4	27	
1950	England	1	28	
1954	South Korea, Scotland, Turkey	3	31	West Germany
1958	Northern Ireland, Soviet Union, Wales	3	34	
1962	Bulgaria, Colombia	2	36	
1966	North Korea, Portugal	2	38	
1970	El Salvador, Israel, Morocco	3	41	
1974	Australia, East Germany, Haiti, Zaire	4	45	
1978	Iran, Tunisia	2	47	
1982	Algeria, Cameroon, Honduras, Kuwait, New Zealand	5	52	
1986	Canada, Denmark, Iraq	3	55	
1990	Costa Rica, Republic of Ireland, United Arab Emirates	3	58	
1994	Greece, Nigeria, Saudi Arabia	3	61	Germany, Russia
1998	Croatia, Jamaica, Japan, South Africa	4	65	FR Yugoslavia
2002	China, Ecuador, Senegal, Slovenia	4	69	
2006	Angola, Ivory Coast, Ghana, Togo, Trinidad and Tobago, Ukraine	6	75	Czech Republic, Serbia and Montenegro
2010	None	0	76	Slovakia, Serbia
2014	Bosnia and Herzegovina	1	77	
2018	Iceland, Panama	2	79	
2022	Qatar	1	80	
2026	Cape Verde, Curaçao, Jordan, Uzbekistan	4	84	DR Congo

== Overall team records ==
The system used in the World Cup up to 1990 was 2 points for a win. In this ranking 3 points are awarded for a win, 1 for a draw, and 0 for a loss. Per statistical convention in football, matches decided in extra time are counted as wins and losses, while matches decided by penalty shoot-outs are counted as draws. Teams are ranked by total points, then by goal difference, then by goals scored, then by number of participations.

As of 2026 FIFA World Cup

Rank	Team	Part.	Pld	W	D	L	GF	GA	GD	Pts	PPG
1	Brazil	23	119	79	20	20	247	112	+135	257	2.16
2	Germany (Note: Germany, officially the Federal Republic of Germany since 1949, has been represented by the same governing body, the Deutscher Fußball-Bund (DFB), since 1904. Following World War II and the division of Germany, the DFB was re-admitted to FIFA after the 1950 World Cup as West Germany. Saar competed in the 1954 World Cup qualifying before joining West Germany in 1956. East Germany fielded teams of their own from 1958 to 1990 before joining with West Germany and the DFB during the German reunification. FIFA officially attributes all international results of the DFB team since 1908 to Germany, including the results of West Germany from 1954–1990.)	21	116	70	22	24	243	135	+108	232	2.00
3	Argentina	19	96	54	17	25	171	109	+62	179	1.86
4	Italy	18	83	45	21	17	128	77	+51	156	1.88
5	France	17	81	45	14	22	156	95	+61	149	1.84
6	England	17	82	38	23	21	124	80	+44	137	1.67
7	Spain	17	75	38	18	19	122	76	+46	132	1.76
8	Netherlands	12	59	32	16	11	107	57	+50	112	1.90
9	Uruguay	15	62	25	15	22	92	80	+12	90	1.45
10	Belgium	15	57	24	12	21	83	81	+2	84	1.47
11	Mexico	18	65	21	15	29	72	104	−32	78	1.20
12	Sweden	13	55	20	14	21	87	83	+4	74	1.35
13	Russia (Note: The Soviet Union qualified seven times prior to its dissolution in 1991. The 15 former nations Soviet republics now compete separately. FIFA considers Russia as the successor team of the Soviet Union. Russia and Ukraine qualified for the World Cup for the first time as separate nations in 1994 and 2006 respectively, with Uzbekistan doing the same in 2026.)	11	45	19	10	16	77	54	+23	67	1.49
14	Portugal	9	40	19	8	13	69	44	+25	65	1.63
15	Serbia (Note: The Yugoslavia national football team qualified eight times during eras of Kingdom of Yugoslavia (1930) and the Socialist Federal Republic of Yugoslavia (1950–1990). They qualified from 1930–1990 under the name Yugoslavia before its breakup in 1992 by the secession of many of its constituent republics. They qualified once in 1998 as the Federal Republic of Yugoslavia, then changed its name to Serbia and Montenegro in 2003, only qualifying under that name in 2006. All of these teams are considered the predecessors of the current Serbia team by FIFA, which first qualified under that name in 2010. The other national teams that resulted from the breakup of the SFR Yugoslavia in 1992 — Croatia, Slovenia, Bosnia and Herzegovina, and North Macedonia — are considered distinct entities from the Yugoslavia team of 1930–1990. Montenegro now also competes separately after independence in 2006 and Kosovo was recognized by FIFA in 2016.)	13	49	18	9	22	71	71	0	63	1.29
16	Switzerland	13	47	17	10	20	65	79	−14	61	1.30
17	Poland	9	38	17	6	15	49	50	−1	57	1.50
18	Croatia	7	34	15	8	11	49	40	+9	53	1.56
19	Hungary	9	32	15	3	14	87	57	+30	48	1.50
20	Austria	8	33	13	5	15	49	56	−7	44	1.45
21	United States	12	42	12	8	22	51	74	−23	44	1.05
22	Slovakia (Note: Czechoslovakia qualified eight times prior to being divided into Slovakia and the Czech Republic in 1993. FIFA considers both the Czech Republic and Slovakia the successor team of Czechoslovakia. The Czech Republic national team qualified for the World Cup for the first time as a separate nation in 2006, with Slovakia doing the same in 2010.)	9	34	12	6	16	49	52	−3	42	1.24
23	Czech Republic	10	36	12	6	18	49	55	−6	42	1.17
24	Colombia	7	27	12	5	10	37	31	+6	41	1.52
25	Chile	9	33	11	7	15	40	49	−9	40	1.21
26	Paraguay	9	32	8	12	12	33	44	−11	36	1.13
27	South Korea	12	41	8	10	23	41	81	−40	34	0.83
28	Denmark	6	23	9	6	8	31	29	+2	33	1.43
29	Morocco	7	29	8	9	12	30	33	−3	33	1.14
30	Japan	8	29	8	8	13	33	38	−5	32	1.10
31	Romania	7	21	8	5	8	30	32	−2	29	1.38
32	Costa Rica	6	21	6	5	10	22	39	−17	23	1.10
33	Cameroon	8	26	5	8	13	22	47	−25	23	0.88
34	Ghana	5	19	6	4	9	20	26	−6	22	1.16
35	Scotland	9	26	5	7	14	26	45	−19	22	0.85
36	Norway	4	14	6	3	5	20	19	+1	21	1.50
37	Senegal	4	16	6	3	7	26	26	0	21	1.31
38	Ecuador	5	17	6	3	8	16	18	−2	21	1.24
39	Nigeria	6	21	6	3	12	23	30	−7	21	1.00
40	Australia	7	24	5	6	13	20	40	−20	21	0.88
41	Turkey	3	13	6	1	6	23	22	+1	19	1.46
42	Peru	5	18	5	3	10	21	33	−12	18	1.00
43	Bulgaria	7	26	3	8	15	22	53	−31	17	0.65
44	Ivory Coast	4	13	5	1	7	18	18	0	16	1.23
45	Algeria	5	17	4	4	9	18	28	−10	16	0.94
46	Iran	7	21	3	7	11	16	34	−18	16	0.76
47	Saudi Arabia	7	22	4	4	14	15	49	−34	16	0.73
48	Republic of Ireland	3	13	2	8	3	10	10	0	14	1.08
49	South Africa	4	13	3	5	5	13	20	−7	14	1.08
50	Northern Ireland	3	13	3	5	5	13	23	−10	14	1.08
51	Tunisia	7	21	3	5	13	16	38	−22	14	0.67
52	East Germany	1	6	2	2	2	5	5	0	8	1.33
53	Egypt	4	12	1	5	6	13	19	−6	8	0.67
54	Greece	3	10	2	2	6	5	20	−15	8	0.80
55	Ukraine	1	5	2	1	2	5	7	−2	7	1.40
56	Bosnia and Herzegovina	2	7	2	1	4	9	12	−3	7	1.00
57	Wales	2	8	1	4	3	5	10	−5	7	0.88
58	Canada	3	11	2	1	8	11	18	−7	7	0.64
59	Slovenia	2	6	1	1	4	5	10	−5	4	0.67
60	Cuba	1	3	1	1	1	5	12	−7	4	1.33
61	DR Congo (Note: The Democratic Republic of the Congo competed as Zaire in 1974.)	2	7	1	1	5	5	19	−14	4	0.57
62	North Korea	2	7	1	1	5	6	21	−15	4	0.57
63	New Zealand	3	9	0	4	5	8	24	−16	4	0.44
64	Cape Verde	1	4	0	3	1	4	5	−1	3	0.75
65	Jamaica	1	3	1	0	2	3	9	−6	3	1.00
66	Honduras	3	9	0	3	6	3	14	−11	3	0.33
67	Angola	1	3	0	2	1	1	2	−1	2	0.67
68	Israel	1	3	0	2	1	1	3	−2	2	0.67
69	Iceland	1	3	0	1	2	2	5	−3	1	0.33
70	Kuwait	1	3	0	1	2	2	6	−4	1	0.33
71	Trinidad and Tobago	1	3	0	1	2	0	4	−4	1	0.33
72	Curaçao	1	3	0	1	2	1	9	−8	1	0.33
73	Qatar	2	6	0	1	5	3	17	−14	1	0.17
74	Bolivia	3	6	0	1	5	1	20	−19	1	0.17
75	Jordan	1	3	0	0	3	3	8	−5	0	0.00
76	Togo	1	3	0	0	3	1	6	−5	0	0.00
77	Indonesia (Note: Indonesia competed as the Dutch East Indies in 1938.)	1	1	0	0	1	0	6	−6	0	0.00
78	United Arab Emirates	1	3	0	0	3	2	11	−9	0	0.00
78	Uzbekistan	1	3	0	0	3	2	11	−9	0	0.00
80	China	1	3	0	0	3	0	9	−9	0	0.00
81	Panama	2	6	0	0	6	2	15	−13	0	0.00
82	Iraq	2	6	0	0	6	2	16	−14	0	0.00
83	Haiti	2	6	0	0	6	4	22	−18	0	0.00
84	El Salvador	2	6	0	0	6	1	22	−21	0	0.00

Breakdown of successor team records

Team	Part	Pld	W	D	L	GF	GA	GD	Pts
Czechoslovakia (1934–1990)	8	30	11	5	14	44	45	−1	38
Czech Republic (2006–present)	2	6	1	1	4	5	10	−5	4
Slovakia (2010–present)	1	4	1	1	2	5	7	−2	4

Team	Part	Pld	W	D	L	GF	GA	GD	Pts
Germany (1934–1938)	2	6	3	1	2	14	13	+1	10
West Germany (1950–1990)	10	62	36	14	12	131	77	+54	122
Germany (1994–present)	9	48	31	7	10	98	45	+53	100

Team	Part	Pld	W	D	L	GF	GA	GD	Pts
Soviet Union (1958–1990)	7	31	15	6	10	53	34	+19	51
Russia (1994–present)	4	14	4	4	6	24	20	+4	16

Team	Part	Pld	W	D	L	GF	GA	GD	Pts
(Kingdom of Yugoslavia) Yugoslavia (1930–1990)	8	33	14	7	12	55	42	+13	49
FR Yugoslavia (1998)	1	4	2	1	1	5	4	+1	7
Serbia and Montenegro (2006)	1	3	0	0	3	2	10	−8	0
Serbia (2010–present)	3	9	2	1	6	9	15	−6	7

Team	Part	Pld	W	D	L	GF	GA	GD	Pts
Zaire (1974)	1	3	0	0	3	0	14	−14	0
DR Congo (2026–present)	1	4	1	1	2	5	5	0	4

== Medal table ==
Rank	Nation	Gold	Silver	Bronze	Total
1	Brazil	5	2	2	9
2	Germany	4	4	4	12
3	Italy	4	2	1	7
4	Argentina	3	4	0	7
5	France	2	2	2	6
6	Spain	2	0	0	2
6	Uruguay	2	0	0	2
8	England	1	0	1	2
9	Netherlands	0	3	1	4
10	Czechoslovakia	0	2	0	2
10	Hungary	0	2	0	2
12	Croatia	0	1	2	3
12	Sweden	0	1	2	3
14	Poland	0	0	2	2
15	Austria	0	0	1	1
15	Belgium	0	0	1	1
15	Chile	0	0	1	1
15	Portugal	0	0	1	1
15	Turkey	0	0	1	1
15	United States	0	0	1	1
Totals (20 entries)		23	23	23	69

Note: The Czech Republic and Slovakia won medals as Czechoslovakia.

== Comprehensive team results by tournament ==
The team ranking in each tournament is according to FIFA. The rankings, apart from the top four positions (top two in 1930), are not a result of direct competition between the teams; instead, teams eliminated in the same round are ranked by their full results in the tournament.

For each tournament, the number of teams in each finals tournament are shown (in parentheses).

Qualification Edition Host(s) (No of teams) Team	1930 (Uruguay) (13)	QF 1934 (Kingdom of Italy) (16)	QF 1938 (France) (15)	QF 1950 (Brazil) (13)	QF 1954 (Switzerland) (16)	QF 1958 (Sweden) (16)	QF 1962 (Chile) (16)	QF 1966 (England) (16)	QF 1970 (Mexico) (16)	QF 1974 (West Germany) (16)	QF 1978 (Argentina) (16)	QF 1982 (Spain) (24)	QF 1986 (Mexico) (24)	QF 1990 (Italy) (24)	QF 1994 (United States) (24)	QF 1998 (France) (32)	QF 2002 (South Korea) (Japan) (32)	QF 2006 (Germany) (32)	QF 2010 (South Africa) (32)	QF 2014 (Brazil) (32)	QF 2018 (Russia) (32)	QF 2022 (Qatar) (32)	QF 2026 (Canada) (Mexico) (United States) (48)	QF 2030 (Morocco) (Portugal) (Spain) (48)	QF 2034 (Saudi Arabia) (48)	Total appearances (as of 2026)
Algeria	Part of France							×	•	•	•	GS1; 13th	GS; 22nd	•	•	•	•	•	GS; 28th	R16; 14th	•	•	R32; 30th	TBD	TBD	5
Angola	—N/a												•	•	•	•	•	GS; 23rd	•	•	•	•	•	TBD	TBD	1
Argentina	2nd	R16; T-9th	×	×		GS; 13th	GS; 10th	QF; 5th	•	GS2; 8th	1st	GS2; 11th	1st	2nd	R16; 10th	QF; 6th	GS; 18th	QF; 6th	QF; 5th	2nd	R16; 16th	1st	2nd	Q	TBD	19
Australia	—N/a							•	•	GS1; 14th	•	•	•	•	•	•	•	R16; 16th	GS; 21st	GS; 30th	GS; 30th	R16; 11th	R32; 22nd	TBD	TBD	7
Austria		4th	•• (Note: Austria qualified in 1938, but withdrew to play as part of Germany after being annexed.)	×	3rd	GS; 15th		•	•	•	GS2; 7th	GS2; 8th	•	GS; T-18th	•	GS; 23rd	•	•	•	•	•	•	R32; 28th	TBD	TBD	8
Belgium	GS; 11th	R16; 15th	R16; 13th	×	GS; 12th	•	•	•	GS; T-10th	•	•	GS2; 10th	4th	R16; 11th	R16; 11th	GS; 19th	R16; 14th	•	•	QF; 6th	3rd	GS; 23rd	QF; 6th	TBD	TBD	15
Bolivia	GS; 12th			GS; 13th	×	•	•	•	•	•	•	•	•	•	GS; 21st	•	•	•	•	•	•	•	•	TBD	TBD	3
Bosnia and Herzegovina	Part of Yugoslavia														—N/a	•	•	•	•	GS; 20th	•	•	R32; 29th	TBD	TBD	2
Brazil	GS; 6th	R16; 14th	3rd	2nd	QF; 5th	1st	1st	GS; 11th	1st	4th	3rd	GS2; 5th	QF; 5th	R16; 9th	1st	2nd	1st	QF; 5th	QF; 6th	4th	QF; 6th	QF; 7th	R16; 11th	TBD	TBD	23
Bulgaria		•×	•		•	•	GS; 15th	GS; 15th	GS; 13th	GS1; 12th	•	•	R16; 15th	•	4th	GS; 29th	•	•	•	•	•	•	•	TBD	TBD	7
Cameroon	—N/a							×	•	•	•	GS1; 17th	•	QF; 7th	GS; 22nd	GS; 25th	GS; 20th	•	GS; 31st	GS; 32nd	•	GS; 19th	•	TBD	TBD	8
Canada						•	×		•	•	•	•	GS; 24th	•	•	•	•	•	•	•	•	GS; 31st	R16; 14th	TBD	TBD	3
Cape Verde	—N/a																•	•	•	•	•	•	R32; 32nd	TBD	TBD	1
Chile	GS; 5th	×		GS; 9th	•	•	3rd	GS; T-13th	•	GS1; 11th	•	GS1; 22nd	•	•	×	R16; 16th	•	•	R16; 10th	R16; 9th	•	•	•	TBD	TBD	9
China (Note: On 14 June 1952, FIFA acknowledged that the CFA on Mainland China, not the Republic of China Football Association (ROCFA) located on Taiwan, was the recognized authority over Chinese football with their membership dating to 1931.)	—N/a					•						•	•	•	•	•	GS; 31st	•	•	•	•	•	•	TBD	TBD	1
Colombia	—N/a		×			•	GS; 14th	•	•	•	•	•	•	R16; 14th	GS; 19th	GS; 21st	•	•	•	QF; 5th	R16; 9th	•	R16; 10th	TBD	TBD	7
Costa Rica			×		×	•	•	•	•	•	•	•	•	R16; 13th	•	•	GS; 19th	GS; 31st	•	QF; 8th	GS; 29th	GS; 27th	•	TBD	TBD	6
Croatia	Part of Yugoslavia														—N/a	3rd	GS; 23rd	GS; 22nd	•	GS; 19th	2nd	3rd	R32; 20th	TBD	TBD	7
Cuba	—N/a	•	QF; 8th	•	×			•	×		•	•		•	×	•	•	•	•	•	•	•	•	TBD	TBD	1
Curaçao (Note: Competed as Curaçao until 1958 and as Netherlands Antilles from 1958 to 2010.)	—N/a					•	•	•	•	•	•	•	•	•	•	•	•	•	•	•	•	•	GS; 42nd	TBD	TBD	1
Czech Republic		2nd	QF; 5th		GS; 14th	GS; 9th	2nd	•	GS; 15th	•	•	GS1; 19th	•	QF; 6th	•	•	•	GS; 20th	•	•	•	•	GS; 39th	TBD	TBD	10
Denmark						•		•	•	•	•	•	R16; 9th	•	•	QF; 8th	R16; 10th	•	GS; 24th	•	R16; 11th	GS; 28th	•	TBD	TBD	6
DR Congo	—N/a								×	GS1; 16th	×	•	•	•	•	•	•	•	•	•	•	•	R32; 23rd	TBD	TBD	2
East Germany	Part of Germany			—N/a		•	•	•	•	GS2; 6th	•	•	•	•	Part of Germany											1
Ecuador				×			•	•	•	•	•	•	•	•	•	•	GS; 24th	R16; 12th	•	GS; 17th	•	GS; 18th	R32; T-25th	TBD	TBD	5
Egypt (Note: Egypt entered qualifying in 1962 and 1966 as the United Arab Republic, but withdrew before playing matches.)	••	R16; 13th	×		•	×	×	×		•	•	•	•	GS; 20th	•	•	•	•	•	•	GS; 31st	•	R16; 15th	TBD	TBD	4
El Salvador	—N/a		×						GS; 16th	•	•	GS1; 24th	•	•	•	•	•	•	•	•	•	•	•	TBD	TBD	2
England	—N/a			GS; 8th	QF; 6th	GS; 11th	QF; 8th	1st	QF; 8th	•	•	GS2; 6th	QF; 8th	4th	•	R16; 9th	QF; 6th	QF; 7th	R16; 13th	GS; 26th	4th	QF; 6th	3rd	TBD	TBD	17
France	GS; 7th	R16; T-9th	QF; 6th	•	GS; 11th	3rd	•	GS; T-13th	•	•	GS1; 12th	4th	3rd	•	•	1st	GS; 28th	2nd	GS; 29th	QF; 7th	1st	2nd	4th	TBD	TBD	17
Germany		3rd	R16; 10th		1st	4th	QF; 7th	2nd	3rd	1st	GS2; 6th	2nd	2nd	1st	QF; 5th	QF; 7th	2nd	3rd	3rd	1st	GS; 22nd	GS; 17th	R32; 18th	TBD	TBD	21
Ghana	—N/a						•	×	•	•	•	×	•	•	•	•	•	R16; 13th	QF; 7th	GS; 25th	•	GS; 24th	R32; 24th	TBD	TBD	5
Greece		•×	•		•	•	•	•	•	•	•	•	•	•	GS; 24th	•	•	•	GS; 25th	R16; 13th	•	•	•	TBD	TBD	3
Haiti	—N/a	•			•				•	GS1; 15th	•	•	•		•	•	•	•	•	•	•	•	GS; 45th	TBD	TBD	2
Honduras	—N/a						•	•	•	•	×	GS1; 18th	•	•	•	•	•	•	GS; 30th	GS; 31st	•	•	•	TBD	TBD	3
Hungary		QF; 6th	2nd		2nd	GS; 10th	QF; 5th	QF; 6th	•	•	GS1; 15th	GS1; 14th	GS; 18th	•	•	•	•	•	•	•	•	•	•	TBD	TBD	9
Iceland	—N/a				×	•				•	•	•	•	•	•	•	•	•	•	•	GS; 28th	•	•	TBD	TBD	1
Indonesia			R16; 15th	×		•×	×			•	•	•	•	•	•	•	•	•	•	•	×	•	•	TBD	TBD	1
Iran	—N/a									•	GS1; 14th	×	×	•	•	GS; 20th	•	GS; T-25th	•	GS; 28th	GS; 18th	GS; 26th	GS; 33rd	TBD	TBD	7
Iraq	—N/a									•	×	•	GS; 23rd	•	•	•	•	•	•	•	•	•	GS; 48th	TBD	TBD	2
Israel (Note: Israel competed as Eretz Yisrael (Land of Israel) in 1934 and in 1938, with a team consisting exclusively of Jewish and British footballers from the Palestine Mandate.)		•	•	•	•	•	•	•	GS; 12th	•	•	•	•	•	•	•	•	•	•	•	•	•	•	TBD	TBD	1
Italy		1st	1st	GS; 7th	GS; 10th	•	GS; 9th	GS; 9th	2nd	GS1; 10th	4th	1st	R16; 12th	3rd	2nd	QF; 5th	R16; 15th	1st	GS; 26th	GS; 22nd	•	•	•	TBD	TBD	18
Ivory Coast	—N/a									•	•		•	•	•	•	•	GS; 19th	GS; 17th	GS; 21st	•	•	R32; 19th	TBD	TBD	4
Jamaica	—N/a							•	•	×	•	•	×	•	•	GS; 22nd	•	•	•	•	•	•	•	TBD	TBD	1
Japan	••		×		•		•		•	•	•	•	•	•	•	GS; 31st	R16; 9th	GS; T-28th	R16; 9th	GS; 29th	R16; 15th	R16; 9th	R32; 21st	TBD	TBD	8
Jordan	—N/a												•	•	•	•	•	•	•	•	•	•	GS; 44th	TBD	TBD	1
Kuwait	—N/a									•	•	GS1; 21st	•	•	•	•	•	•	•	•	•×	•	•	TBD	TBD	1
Mexico	GS; 13th	•	×	GS; 12th	GS; 13th	GS; 16th	GS; 11th	GS; 12th	QF; 6th	•	GS1; 16th	•	QF; 6th	×	R16; 13th	R16; 13th	R16; 11th	R16; 15th	R16; 14th	R16; 10th	R16; 12th	GS; 22nd	R16; 9th	TBD	TBD	18
Morocco	—N/a						•	×	GS; 14th	•	•	•	R16; 11th	•	GS; 23rd	GS; 18th	•	•	•	•	GS; 27th	4th	QF; T-7th	Q	TBD	7
Netherlands		R16; T-9th	R16; 14th			•	•	•	•	2nd	2nd	•	•	R16; 15th	QF; 7th	4th	•	R16; 11th	2nd	3rd	•	QF; 5th	R32; 17th	TBD	TBD	12
New Zealand	—N/a								•	•	•	GS1; 23rd	•	•	•	•	•	•	GS; 22nd	•	•	•	GS; 40th	TBD	TBD	3
Nigeria	—N/a						•	×	•	•	•	•	•	•	R16; 9th	R16; 12th	GS; 27th	•	GS; 27th	R16; 16th	GS; 21st	•	•	TBD	TBD	6
North Korea	—N/a							QF; 8th	×	•	×	•	•	•	•			•	GS; 32nd	•	•	•×	•	TBD	TBD	2
Northern Ireland (Note: Northern Ireland competed as Ireland in 1950.)	—N/a			•	•	QF; 8th	•	•	•	•	•	GS2; 9th	GS; 21st	•	•	•	•	•	•	•	•	•	•	TBD	TBD	3
Norway			R16; 12th		•	•	•	•	•	•	•	•	•	•	GS; 17th	R16; 15th	•	•	•	•	•	•	QF; 5th	TBD	TBD	4
Panama	—N/a										•	•	•	•	•	•	•	•	•	•	GS; 32nd	•	GS; 43rd	TBD	TBD	2
Paraguay	GS; 9th			GS; 11th	•	GS; 12th	•	•	•	•	•	•	R16; 13th	•	•	R16; 14th	R16; 16th	GS; 18th	QF; 8th	•	•	•	R16; 16th	Q	TBD	9
Peru	GS; 10th	×		×	×	•	•	•	QF; 7th	•	GS2; 8th	GS1; 20th	•	•	•	•	•	•	•	•	GS; 20th	•	•	TBD	TBD	5
Poland		•×	R16; 11th		×	•	•	•	•	3rd	GS2; 5th	3rd	R16; 14th	•	•	•	GS; 25th	GS; 21st	•	•	GS; 25th	R16; 15th	•	TBD	TBD	9
Portugal		•	•	•	•	•	•	3rd	•	•	•	•	GS; 17th	•	•	•	GS; 21st	4th	R16; 11th	GS; 18th	R16; 13th	QF; 8th	R16; 13th	Q	TBD	9
Qatar	—N/a									×	•	•	•	•	•	•	•	•	•	•	•	GS; 32nd	GS; 41st	TBD	TBD	2
Republic of Ireland (Note: Republic of Ireland competed as the Irish Free State in 1934 and 1938 and then as Ireland in 1950.)		•	•	•	•	•	•	•	•	•	•	•	•	QF; 8th	R16; 16th	•	R16; 12th	•	•	•	•	•	•	TBD	TBD	3
Romania	GS; 8th	R16; 12th	R16; 9th		•	•	•	•	GS; T-10th	•	•	•	•	R16; 12th	QF; 6th	R16; 11th	•	•	•	•	•	•	•	TBD	TBD	7
Russia						QF; 7th	QF; 6th	4th	QF; 5th	•×	•	GS2; 7th	R16; 10th	GS; 17th	GS; 18th	•	GS; 22nd	•	•	GS; 24th	QF; 8th	•×	×	TBD	TBD	11
Saudi Arabia	—N/a										•	•	•	•	R16; 12th	GS; 28th	GS; 32nd	GS; T-28th	•	•	GS; 26th	GS; 25th	GS; 38th	TBD	Q	7
Scotland	—N/a			••	GS; 15th	GS; 14th	•	•	•	GS1; 9th	GS1; 11th	GS1; 15th	GS; 19th	GS; T-18th	•	GS; 27th	•	•	•	•	•	•	GS; 36th	TBD	TBD	9
Senegal	—N/a							×	•	•	•	•	•		•	•	QF; 7th	•	•	•	GS; 17th	R16; 10th	R32; 31st	TBD	TBD	4
Serbia	4th (Note: There was no match for third place in 1930. The United States and Yugoslavia lost in the semi-finals. Both captains received bronze medals. Currently, FIFA recognizes USA as the third-placed team and Yugoslavia as the fourth-placed team, using the overall records of the teams in the 1930 World Cup.)	•	•	GS; 5th	QF; 7th	QF; 5th	4th	•	•	GS2; 7th	•	GS1; 16th	•	QF; 5th	×	R16; 10th	•	GS; 32nd	GS; 23rd	•	GS; 23rd	GS; 29th	•	TBD	TBD	13
Slovakia		2nd	QF; 5th		GS; 14th	GS; 9th	2nd	•	GS; 15th	•	•	GS1; 19th	•	QF; 6th	•	•	•	•	R16; 16th	•	•	•	•	TBD	TBD	9
Slovenia	Part of Yugoslavia														—N/a	•	GS; 30th	•	GS; 18th	•	•	•	•	TBD	TBD	2
South Africa	—N/a							×	—N/a						•	GS; 24th	GS; 17th	•	GS; 20th	•	•	•	R32; T-25th	TBD	TBD	4
South Korea	—N/a				GS; 16th	×	•	×	•	•	•	•	GS; 20th	GS; 22nd	GS; 20th	GS; 30th	4th	GS; 17th	R16; 15th	GS; 27th	GS; 19th	R16; 16th	GS; 34th	TBD	TBD	12
Spain		QF; 5th	×	4th	•	•	GS; 12th	GS; 10th	•	•	GS1; 10th	GS2; 12th	QF; 7th	R16; 10th	QF; 8th	GS; 17th	QF; 5th	R16; 9th	1st	GS; 23rd	R16; 10th	R16; 13th	1st	Q	TBD	17
Sweden		QF; 8th	4th	3rd	•	2nd	•	•	GS; 9th	GS2; 5th	GS1; 13th	•	•	GS; 21st	3rd	•	R16; 13th	R16; 14th	•	•	QF; 7th	•	R32; 27th	TBD	TBD	13
Switzerland		QF; 7th	QF; 7th	GS; 6th	QF; 8th	•	GS; 16th	GS; 16th	•	•	•	•	•	•	R16; 15th	•	•	R16; 10th	GS; 19th	R16; 11th	R16; 14th	R16; 12th	QF; T-7th	TBD	TBD	13
Togo	—N/a									•	•	•	×	×	•	•	•	GS; 30th	•	•	•	•	•	TBD	TBD	1
Trinidad and Tobago	—N/a							•	•	•	•	•	•	•	•	•	•	GS; 27th	•	•	•	•	•	TBD	TBD	1
Tunisia	—N/a						•	×	•	•	GS1; 9th	•	•	•	•	GS; 26th	GS; 29th	GS; 24th	•	•	GS; 24th	GS; 21st	GS; 47th	TBD	TBD	7
Turkey		×		••	GS; 9th	×	•	•	•	•	•	•	•	•	•	•	3rd	•	•	•	•	•	GS; 35th	TBD	TBD	3
Ukraine	Part of Soviet Union														—N/a	•	•	QF; 8th	•	•	•	•	•	TBD	TBD	1
United Arab Emirates	—N/a										×		•	GS; 24th	•	•	•	•	•	•	•	•	•	TBD	TBD	1
United States	3rd	R16; 16th	×	GS; 10th	•	•	•	•	•	•	•	•	•	GS; 23rd	R16; 14th	GS; 32nd	QF; 8th	GS; T-25th	R16; 12th	R16; 15th	•	R16; 14th	R16; 12th	TBD	TBD	12
Uruguay	1st			1st	4th	•	GS; 13th	QF; 7th	4th	GS1; 13th	•	•	R16; 16th	R16; 16th	•	•	GS; 26th	•	4th	R16; 12th	QF; 5th	GS; 20th	GS; 37th	Q	TBD	15
Uzbekistan	Part of Soviet Union														—N/a	•	•	•	•	•	•	•	GS; 46th	TBD	TBD	1
Wales	—N/a			•	•	QF; 6th	•	•	•	•	•	•	•	•	•	•	•	•	•	•	•	GS; 30th	•	TBD	TBD	2

Legend

1st	Champions
2nd	Runners-up
3rd	Third place
4th	Fourth place
QF	Quarter-finals (1934–1938, 1954–1970, 1986–present)
R16	Knockout round of 16 (1934–1938, 1986–present)
R32	Knockout round of 32 (2026–present)
GS	Group stage (1930, 1950–1970, 1986–present)
GS1	First group stage (1974–1982)
GS2	Second group stage (1974–1982)

Q	Qualified for upcoming tournament
TBD	To be determined (may still qualify for upcoming tournament)
••	Qualified but withdrew
•	Did not qualify
•×	Withdrew or disqualified during qualification (after playing matches)
×	Withdrew before qualification / Banned / Entry not accepted by FIFA
	Hosts
	Did not enter
—N/a	Not a FIFA member

== Hosts ==
Results of host nations
Year	Host nation	Finish
1930	Uruguay	Champions
1934	Italy	Champions
1938	France	Quarter-finals
1950	Brazil	Runners-up
1954	Switzerland	Quarter-finals
1958	Sweden	Runners-up
1962	Chile	Third place
1966	England	Champions
1970	Mexico	Quarter-finals
1974	West Germany	Champions
1978	Argentina	Champions
1982	Spain	Second round
1986	Mexico	Quarter-finals
1990	Italy	Third place
1994	United States	Round of 16
1998	France	Champions
2002	South Korea	Fourth place
2002	Japan	Round of 16
2006	Germany	Third place
2010	South Africa	Group stage
2014	Brazil	Fourth place
2018	Russia	Quarter-finals
2022	Qatar	Group stage
2026	Canada	Round of 16
2026	Mexico	Round of 16
2026	United States	Round of 16
2030	Morocco	Future event
2030	Portugal	Future event
2030	Spain	Future event
2034	Saudi Arabia	Future event

== Results of defending finalists ==
The defending World Cup champions were formerly granted an automatic spot in the Cup finals field. This berth is no longer guaranteed since the 2006 tournament. However, no defending World Cup champion has yet failed to qualify. Automatic berths have never been given for defending World Cup runners-up. Defending runners-up have qualified 17 times in 21 attempts for the following World Cup.

Year	Defending champions	Finish	Defending runners-up	Finish
1934	Uruguay	Did not enter	Argentina	Round of 16
1938	Italy	Champions	Czechoslovakia	Quarter-finals
1950	Italy	Group stage	Hungary	Did not enter
1954	Uruguay	Fourth place	Brazil	Quarter-finals
1958	West Germany	Fourth place	Hungary	Group stage
1962	Brazil	Champions	Sweden	Did not qualify
1966	Brazil	Group stage	Czechoslovakia	Did not qualify
1970	England	Quarter-finals	West Germany	Third place
1974	Brazil	Fourth place	Italy	Group stage
1978	West Germany	Second round	Netherlands	Runners-up
1982	Argentina	Second round	Netherlands	Did not qualify
1986	Italy	Round of 16	West Germany	Runners-up
1990	Argentina	Runners-up	West Germany	Champions
1994	Germany	Quarter-finals	Argentina	Round of 16
1998	Brazil	Runners-up	Italy	Quarter-finals
2002	France	Group stage	Brazil	Champions
2006	Brazil	Quarter-finals	Germany	Third place
2010	Italy	Group stage	France	Group stage
2014	Spain	Group stage	Netherlands	Third place
2018	Germany	Group stage	Argentina	Round of 16
2022	France	Runners-up	Croatia	Third place
2026	Argentina	Runners-up	France	Fourth place
2030	Spain	TBD	Argentina	TBD

== Results by confederation ==
— Hosts are from this confederation

=== Overview ===
Confederation	1st	2nd	3rd	4th	Top 8	Top 16	Top 32
UEFA	13	17	19	16	111	106	13
CONMEBOL	10	6	3	5	37	41	5
CONCACAF	0	0	1	0	5	18	3
CAF	0	0	0	1	5	13	9
AFC	0	0	0	1	2	9	2
OFC	0	0	0	0	0	1	0

=== AFC ===
	1930 (Uruguay) (13)	1934 (Italy) (16)	1938 (France) (15)	1950 (Brazil) (13)	1954 (Switzerland) (16)	1958 (Sweden) (16)	1962 (Chile) (16)	1966 (England) (16)	1970 (Mexico) (16)	1974 (West Germany) (16)	1978 (Argentina) (16)	1982 (Spain) (24)	1986 (Mexico) (24)	1990 (Italy) (24)	1994 (United States) (24)	1998 (France) (32)	2002 (South Korea) (Japan) (32)	2006 (Germany) (32)	2010 (South Africa) (32)	2014 (Brazil) (32)	2018 (Russia) (32)	2022 (Qatar) (32)	2026 (Canada) (Mexico) (United States) (48)	2030 (Morocco) (Portugal) (Spain) (48)	2034 (Saudi Arabia) (48)	Total
Teams	0	0	1	0	1	0	0	1	1	0	1	1	2	2	2	4	4	4	4	4	5	6	9		1	53
Top 32	—	—	—	—	—	—	—	—	—	—	—	—	—	—	—	—	—	—	—	—	—	—	2			2
Top 16	—	—	—	—	—	—	—	—	—	—	—	0 (Note: In 1982, the second round had 12 teams of which 4 progressed to the semi-finals.)	0	0	1	0	2	0	2	0	1	3	0			9
Top 8	—	0	0	—	0	0	0	1	0	0	0	0	0	0	0	0	1	0	0	0	0	0	0			2
Top 4	0	0	0	0	0	0	0	0	0	0	0	0	0	0	0	0	1	0	0	0	0	0	0			1
Top 2	0	0	0	0	0	0	0	0	0	0	0	0	0	0	0	0	0	0	0	0	0	0	0			0
1st																										0
2nd																										0
3rd																										0
4th																	(South Korea)									1

=== CAF ===
	1930 (Uruguay) (13)	1934 (Italy) (16)	1938 (France) (15)	1950 (Brazil) (13)	1954 (Switzerland) (16)	1958 (Sweden) (16)	1962 (Chile) (16)	1966 (England) (16)	1970 (Mexico) (16)	1974 (West Germany) (16)	1978 (Argentina) (16)	1982 (Spain) (24)	1986 (Mexico) (24)	1990 (Italy) (24)	1994 (United States) (24)	1998 (France) (32)	2002 (South Korea) (Japan) (32)	2006 (Germany) (32)	2010 (South Africa) (32)	2014 (Brazil) (32)	2018 (Russia) (32)	2022 (Qatar) (32)	2026 (Canada) (Mexico) (United States) (48)	2030 (Morocco) (Portugal) (Spain) (48)	2034 (Saudi Arabia) (48)	Total
Teams	0	1	0	0	0	0	0	0	1	1	1	2	2	2	3	5	5	5	6	5	5	5	10	1		60
Top 32	—	—	—	—	—	—	—	—	—	—	—	—	—	—	—	—	—	—	—	—	—	—	9			9
Top 16	—	—	—	—	—	—	—	—	—	—	—	0	1	1	1	1	1	1	1	2	0	2	2			13
Top 8	—	0	0	—	0	0	0	0	0	0	0	0	0	1	0	0	1	0	1	0	0	1	1			5
Top 4	0	0	0	0	0	0	0	0	0	0	0	0	0	0	0	0	0	0	0	0	0	1	0			1
Top 2	0	0	0	0	0	0	0	0	0	0	0	0	0	0	0	0	0	0	0	0	0	0	0			0
1st																										0
2nd																										0
3rd																										0
4th																						(Morocco)				1

=== CONCACAF ===
	1930 (Uruguay) (13)	1934 (Italy) (16)	1938 (France) (15)	1950 (Brazil) (13)	1954 (Switzerland) (16)	1958 (Sweden) (16)	1962 (Chile) (16)	1966 (England) (16)	1970 (Mexico) (16)	1974 (West Germany) (16)	1978 (Argentina) (16)	1982 (Spain) (24)	1986 (Mexico) (24)	1990 (Italy) (24)	1994 (United States) (24)	1998 (France) (32)	2002 (South Korea) (Japan) (32)	2006 (Germany) (32)	2010 (South Africa) (32)	2014 (Brazil) (32)	2018 (Russia) (32)	2022 (Qatar) (32)	2026 (Canada) (Mexico) (United States) (48)	2030 (Morocco) (Portugal) (Spain) (48)	2034 (Saudi Arabia) (48)	Total
Teams	2	1	1	2	1	1	1	1	2	1	1	2	2	2	2	3	3	4	3	4	3	4	6			52
Top 32	—	—	—	—	—	—	—	—	—	—	—	—	—	—	—	—	—	—	—	—	—	—	3			3
Top 16	—	—	—	—	—	—	—	—	—	—	—	0	1	1	2	1	2	1	2	3	1	1	3			18
Top 8	—	0	1	—	0	0	0	0	1	0	0	0	1	0	0	0	1	0	0	1	0	0	0			5
Top 4	1	0	0	0	0	0	0	0	0	0	0	0	0	0	0	0	0	0	0	0	0	0	0			1
Top 2	0	0	0	0	0	0	0	0	0	0	0	0	0	0	0	0	0	0	0	0	0	0	0			0
1st																										0
2nd																										0
3rd	(United States)																									1
4th																										0

=== CONMEBOL ===
	1930 (Uruguay) (13)	1934 (Italy) (16)	1938 (France) (15)	1950 (Brazil) (13)	1954 (Switzerland) (16)	1958 (Sweden) (16)	1962 (Chile) (16)	1966 (England) (16)	1970 (Mexico) (16)	1974 (West Germany) (16)	1978 (Argentina) (16)	1982 (Spain) (24)	1986 (Mexico) (24)	1990 (Italy) (24)	1994 (United States) (24)	1998 (France) (32)	2002 (South Korea) (Japan) (32)	2006 (Germany) (32)	2010 (South Africa) (32)	2014 (Brazil) (32)	2018 (Russia) (32)	2022 (Qatar) (32)	2026 (Canada) (Mexico) (United States) (48)	2030 (Morocco) (Portugal) (Spain) (48)	2034 (Saudi Arabia) (48)	Total
Teams	7	2	1	5	2	3	5	4	3	4	3	4	4	4	4	5	5	4	5	6	5	4	6	3		98
Top 32	—	—	—	—	—	—	—	—	—	—	—	—	—	—	—	—	—	—	—	—	—	—	5			5
Top 16	—	—	—	—	—	—	—	—	—	—	—	2	4	4	2	4	2	3	5	5	4	2	4			41
Top 8	—	0	1	—	2	1	2	2	3	2	3	2	2	1	1	2	1	2	4	3	2	2	1			37
Top 4	2	0	1	2	1	1	2	0	2	1	2	0	1	1	1	1	1	0	1	2	0	1	1			24
Top 2	2	0	0	2	0	1	1	0	1	0	1	0	1	1	1	1	1	0	0	1	0	1	1			16
1st	(Uruguay)			(Uruguay)		(Brazil)	(Brazil)		(Brazil)		(Argentina)		(Argentina)		(Brazil)		(Brazil)					(Argentina)				10
2nd	(Argentina)			(Brazil)										(Argentina)		(Brazil)				(Argentina)			(Argentina)			6
3rd			(Brazil)				(Chile)				(Brazil)															3
4th					(Uruguay)				(Uruguay)	(Brazil)									(Uruguay)	(Brazil)						5

=== OFC ===
	1930 (Uruguay) (13)	1934 (Italy) (16)	1938 (France) (15)	1950 (Brazil) (13)	1954 (Switzerland) (16)	1958 (Sweden) (16)	1962 (Chile) (16)	1966 (England) (16)	1970 (Mexico) (16)	1974 (West Germany) (16)	1978 (Argentina) (16)	1982 (Spain) (24)	1986 (Mexico) (24)	1990 (Italy) (24)	1994 (United States) (24)	1998 (France) (32)	2002 (South Korea) (Japan) (32)	2006 (Germany) (32)	2010 (South Africa) (32)	2014 (Brazil) (32)	2018 (Russia) (32)	2022 (Qatar) (32)	2026 (Canada) (Mexico) (United States) (48)	2030 (Morocco) (Portugal) (Spain) (48)	2034 (Saudi Arabia) (48)	Total
Teams	0	0	0	0	0	0	0	0	0	1	0	1	0	0	0	0	0	1	1	0	0	0	1			5
Top 32	—	—	—	—	—	—	—	—	—	—	—	—	—	—	—	—	—	—	—	—	—	—	0			0
Top 16	—	—	—	—	—	—	—	—	—	—	—	0	0	0	0	0	0	1	0	0	0	0	0			1
Top 8	—	0	0	—	0	0	0	0	0	0	0	0	0	0	0	0	0	0	0	0	0	0	0			0
Top 4	0	0	0	0	0	0	0	0	0	0	0	0	0	0	0	0	0	0	0	0	0	0	0			0
Top 2	0	0	0	0	0	0	0	0	0	0	0	0	0	0	0	0	0	0	0	0	0	0	0			0
1st																										0
2nd																										0
3rd																										0
4th																										0

=== UEFA ===
	1930 (Uruguay) (13)	1934 (Italy) (16)	1938 (France) (15)	1950 (Brazil) (13)	1954 (Switzerland) (16)	1958 (Sweden) (16)	1962 (Chile) (16)	1966 (England) (16)	1970 (Mexico) (16)	1974 (West Germany) (16)	1978 (Argentina) (16)	1982 (Spain) (24)	1986 (Mexico) (24)	1990 (Italy) (24)	1994 (United States) (24)	1998 (France) (32)	2002 (South Korea) (Japan) (32)	2006 (Germany) (32)	2010 (South Africa) (32)	2014 (Brazil) (32)	2018 (Russia) (32)	2022 (Qatar) (32)	2026 (Canada) (Mexico) (United States) (48)	2030 (Morocco) (Portugal) (Spain) (48)	2034 (Saudi Arabia) (48)	Total
Teams	4	12	12	6	12	12	10	10	9	9	10	14	14	14	13	15	15	14	13	13	14	13	16	2		276
Top 32	—	—	—	—	—	—	—	—	—	—	—	—	—	—	—	—	—	—	—	—	—	—	13			13
Top 16	—	—	—	—	—	—	—	—	—	—	—	10	10	10	10	10	9	10	6	6	10	8	7			106
Top 8	—	8	6	—	6	7	6	5	4	6	5	10	5	6	7	6	4	6	3	4	6	5	6			111
Top 4	1	4	3	2	3	3	2	4	2	3	2	4	3	3	3	3	2	4	3	2	4	2	3			65
Top 2	0	2	2	0	2	1	1	2	1	2	1	2	1	1	1	1	1	2	2	1	2	1	1			30
1st		(Italy)	(Italy)		(West Germany)			(England)		(West Germany)		(Italy)		(West Germany)		(France)		(Italy)	(Spain)	(Germany)	(France)		(Spain)			13
2nd		(Czechoslovakia)	(Hungary)		(Hungary)	(Sweden)	(Czechoslovakia)	(West Germany)	(Italy)	(Netherlands)	(Netherlands)	(West Germany)	(West Germany)		(Italy)		(Germany)	(France)	(Netherlands)		(Croatia)	(France)				17
3rd		(Germany)		(Sweden)	(Austria)	(France)		(Portugal)	(West Germany)	(Poland)		(Poland)	(France)	(Italy)	(Sweden)	(Croatia)	(Turkey)	(Germany)	(Germany)	(Netherlands)	(Belgium)	(Croatia)	(England)			19
4th	(Kingdom of Yugoslavia)	(Austria)	(Sweden)	(Spain)		(West Germany)	(Socialist Federal Republic of Yugoslavia)	(Soviet Union)			(Italy)	(France)	(Belgium)	(England)	(Bulgaria)	(Netherlands)		(Portugal)			(England)		(France)			16

=== Overall ===
	1930 (Uruguay) (13)	1934 (Italy) (16)	1938 (France) (15)	1950 (Brazil) (13)	1954 (Switzerland) (16)	1958 (Sweden) (16)	1962 (Chile) (16)	1966 (England) (16)	1970 (Mexico) (16)	1974 (West Germany) (16)	1978 (Argentina) (16)	1982 (Spain) (24)	1986 (Mexico) (24)	1990 (Italy) (24)	1994 (United States) (24)	1998 (France) (32)	2002 (South Korea) (Japan) (32)	2006 (Germany) (32)	2010 (South Africa) (32)	2014 (Brazil) (32)	2018 (Russia) (32)	2022 (Qatar) (32)	2026 (Canada) (Mexico) (United States) (48)	2030 (Morocco) (Portugal) (Spain) (48)	2034 (Saudi Arabia) (48)	Total
1st	(Uruguay)	(Italy)	(Italy)	(Uruguay)	(West Germany)	(Brazil)	(Brazil)	(England)	(Brazil)	(West Germany)	(Argentina)	(Italy)	(Argentina)	(West Germany)	(Brazil)	(France)	(Brazil)	(Italy)	(Spain)	(Germany)	(France)	(Argentina)	(Spain)			23
2nd	(Argentina)	(Czechoslovakia)	(Hungary)	(Brazil)	(Hungary)	(Sweden)	(Czechoslovakia)	(West Germany)	(Italy)	(Netherlands)	(Netherlands)	(West Germany)	(West Germany)	(Argentina)	(Italy)	(Brazil)	(Germany)	(France)	(Netherlands)	(Argentina)	(Croatia)	(France)	(Argentina)			23
3rd	(United States)	(Germany)	(Brazil)	(Sweden)	(Austria)	(France)	(Chile)	(Portugal)	(West Germany)	(Poland)	(Brazil)	(Poland)	(France)	(Italy)	(Sweden)	(Croatia)	(Turkey)	(Germany)	(Germany)	(Netherlands)	(Belgium)	(Croatia)	(England)			23
4th	(Kingdom of Yugoslavia)	(Austria)	(Sweden)	(Spain)	(Uruguay)	(West Germany)	(Socialist Federal Republic of Yugoslavia)	(Soviet Union)	(Uruguay)	(Brazil)	(Italy)	(France)	(Belgium)	(England)	(Bulgaria)	(Netherlands)	(South Korea)	(Portugal)	(Uruguay)	(Brazil)	(England)	(Morocco)	(France)			23

== Droughts ==
This section is a list of droughts associated with the participation of national football teams in the FIFA World Cups. 1942 and 1946, when the tournament was not held due to World War II, are not included in the calculation of a drought.

=== Active World Cup appearance droughts ===
Does not include teams that have not yet made their first appearance or teams that no longer exist.

As of 2026 FIFA World Cup

Team	Last appearance	WC missed
Cuba	1938	20
Indonesia	1938	20
Israel	1970	14
El Salvador	1982	11
Kuwait	1982	11
Hungary	1986	10
Northern Ireland	1986	10
United Arab Emirates	1990	9
Bolivia	1994	8
Bulgaria	1998	7
Romania	1998	7
Jamaica	1998	7
China	2002	6
Republic of Ireland	2002	6
Angola	2006	5
Togo	2006	5
Trinidad and Tobago	2006	5
Ukraine	2006	5
North Korea	2010	4
Slovakia	2010	4
Slovenia	2010	4
Chile	2014	3
Greece	2014	3
Honduras	2014	3
Italy	2014	3
Iceland	2018	2
Nigeria	2018	2
Peru	2018	2
Russia	2018	2
Cameroon	2022	1
Costa Rica	2022	1
Denmark	2022	1
Poland	2022	1
Serbia	2022	1
Wales	2022	1

=== Longest World Cup appearance droughts overall ===
This is a list of the longest droughts between World Cup appearances. Only includes droughts begun after a team's first appearance until the team ceased to exist.

As of 2026 FIFA World Cup

Team	Prev. appearance	Next appearance	WC missed
Cuba	1938	active	20
Indonesia	1938	active	20
Wales	1958	2022	15
Israel	1970	active	14
DR Congo	1974	2026	12
Haiti	1974	2026	12
Egypt	1934	1990	11
El Salvador	1982	active	11
Kuwait	1982	active	11
Norway	1938	1994	11
Turkey	1954	2002	11
Bolivia	1950	1994	10
North Korea	1966	2010	10
Hungary	1986	active	10
Northern Ireland	1986	active	10
United States	1950	1990	9
Iraq	1986	2026	9
United Arab Emirates	1990	active	9
Peru	1982	2018	8
Canada	1986	2022	8
Bolivia	1994	active	8
Peru	1930	1970	7
South Korea	1954	1986	7
Australia	1974	2006	7
Bulgaria	1998	active	7
Jamaica	1998	active	7
Romania	1998	active	7
Netherlands	1938	1974	6
Poland	1938	1974	6
Paraguay	1958	1986	6
Colombia	1962	1990	6
Switzerland	1966	1994	6
Honduras	1982	2010	6
New Zealand	1982	2010	6
Egypt	1990	2018	6
Austria	1998	2026	6
Norway	1998	2026	6
Scotland	1998	2026	6
China	2002	active	6
Republic of Ireland	2002	active	6
Romania	1938	1970	5
Northern Ireland	1958	1982	5
Algeria	1986	2010	5
Turkey	2002	2026	5
Angola	2006	active	5
Togo	2006	active	5
Trinidad and Tobago	2006	active	5
Ukraine	2006	active	5

== See also ==
- AFC Asian Cup records and statistics
- Africa Cup of Nations records and statistics
- CONCACAF Gold Cup records and statistics
- Copa América records and statistics
- FIFA Arab Cup records and statistics
- FIFA Beach Soccer World Cup records and statistics
- FIFA U-17 World Cup records and statistics
- FIFA U-20 World Cup records and statistics
- FIFA Confederations Cup records and statistics
- FIFA Futsal World Cup
- FIFA Women's World Cup records and statistics
- Men's Olympic football tournament records and statistics
- OFC Men's Nations Cup records and statistics
- UEFA European Championship records and statistics
- Women's Olympic football tournament records and statistics
