= 1966 Arab Cup =

3rd Arab Cup, held in Iraq

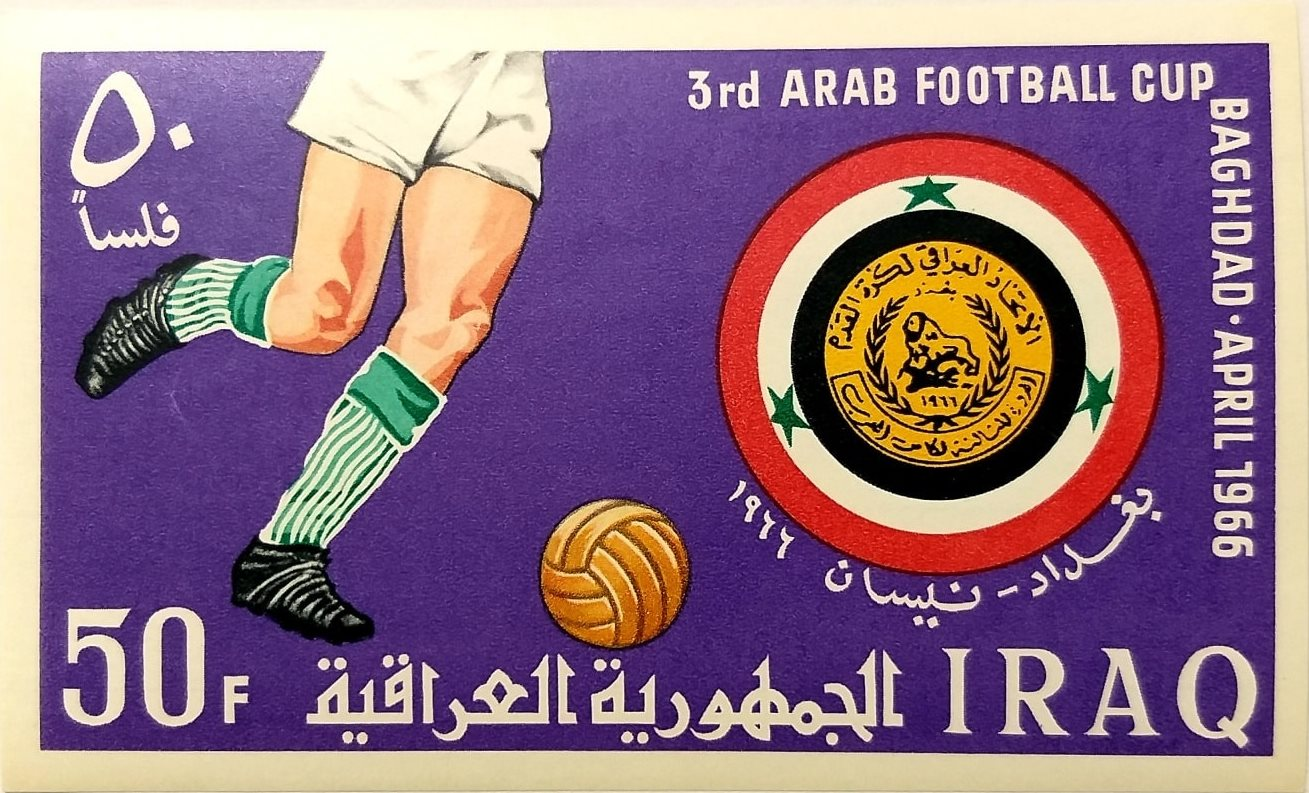
- Postcard promoting the 3rd Arab Football Cup

Tournament details
- Host country: Iraq
- Dates: 1–10 April
- Teams: 10 (from 2 confederations)
- Venues: 3 (in 3 host cities)

Final positions
- Champions: Iraq (2nd title)
- Runners-up: Syria
- Third place: Libya
- Fourth place: Lebanon

Tournament statistics
- Matches played: 20
- Goals scored: 98 (4.9 per match)
- Top scorer(s): (Libya) Ali Al-Biski (10 goals)
- Best player: (Iraq) Shidrak Yousif

The 1966 Arab Cup was the third edition of the Arab Cup hosted in Baghdad, Iraq. The host nation and defending champions Iraq won the title for the 2nd time.

At the tournament's closing ceremony, the chairman of the Arab Cup Organising Committee announced that the next edition of the Arab Cup would be held in 1967 in Damascus, Syria, however, this did not end up taking place.

== Participating teams ==
A total of 10 teams participated in the competition. United Arab Republic initially agreed to take part, but later withdrew. Sudan were invited to participate but declined.

The 10 participating teams were:

Team	Qualified as	Previous appearances in tournament (Note: Bold indicates champion for that year, Italic indicates host.)
Iraq	Hosts & holders	1 (**1964**)
Bahrain	Invitee	0 (debut)
Jordan	Invitee	2 (1963, 1964)
Kuwait	Invitee	2 (1963, 1964)
Lebanon	Invitee	2 (1963, 1964)
Libya	Invitee	1 (1964)
North Yemen	Invitee	0 (debut)
Muscat and Oman	Invitee	0 (debut)
Palestine	Invitee	0 (debut)
Syria	Invitee	1 (1963)

== Venues ==
1966 Arab Cup is located in Iraq	Baghdad	Habbaniyah	Kut
1966 Arab Cup is located in Iraq	Al-Kashafa Stadium	Al-Habbaniyah Stadium	Al-Kut Stadium
1966 Arab Cup is located in Iraq	Capacity: **14,000**	Capacity: **5,000**	Capacity: **5,000**

== Group stage ==
=== Group A ===
Team	Pld	W	D	L	GF	GA	GD	Pts
Iraq	4	3	1	0	15	3	+12	**7**
Lebanon	4	3	1	0	10	3	+7	**7**
Kuwait	4	1	1	2	10	9	+1	**3**
Jordan	4	1	0	3	7	9	–2	**2**
Bahrain	4	0	1	3	7	25	–28	**1**

1 April 1966

Iraq	3–1	Kuwait
Yousif 19'; Dhiab 28'; Atta 78'		Al-Dawla 66'

Al-Kashafa Stadium, Baghdad
Referee: Mamdouh Khourma (Jordan)
2 April 1966

Lebanon	6–1	Bahrain
El-Sharki; Chatila; Berjaoui; Abou Murad; Altounian		Ayub

Al-Kashafa Stadium, Baghdad
Referee: Mamdouh Khourma (Jordan)

2 April 1966

Iraq	2–1	Jordan
Assad; Atta		Al-Shaqran 22'

Al-Kashafa Stadium, Baghdad
Referee: Rashad Hawasly (Syria)
3 April 1966

Lebanon	2–1	Kuwait
El-Sharki 2'; Apo 62'		Al-Dawla 26'

Al-Kashafa Stadium, Baghdad
Referee: Salih Faraj (Iraq)

5 April 1966
10:00 UTC+3

Iraq	10–1	Bahrain
Ismail 6'; Dhiab 18', 42', 49', 66'; Jameel 25', 55'; Dawood 35'; Hameed 39'; Najim		Salmeen 60'

Al-Kashafa Stadium, Baghdad
Referee: Rashad Hawasly (Syria)
5 April 1966

Lebanon	2–1	Jordan
El-Sharki 56'; Abou Murad 59'		Issa 14'

Al-Kashafa Stadium, Baghdad
Referee: Salih Faraj (Iraq)

6 April 1966

Kuwait	4–4	Bahrain
Al-Dawla 20', 35', 59'; Al-Masoud 24'		Saleem 14', 32'; Waleed 33'; Ayub 35'

Al-Habbaniyah Stadium, Habbaniyah
Referee: Rashad Hawasly (Syria)
7 April 1966

Jordan	5–1	Bahrain
Issa 22' (?); Al-Adwan 60'; ?; ?		Zuleikh

Al-Kashafa Stadium, Baghdad
Referee: Fahmi Al-Qaimaqchi (Iraq)

7 April 1966

Iraq	0–0	Lebanon

Al-Kashafa Stadium, Baghdad
Referee: Mamdouh Khourma (Jordan)
8 April 1966

Kuwait	4–0	Jordan
Al-Dawla 2', 63', 71'; Al-Khatib 42'

Al-Kashafa Stadium, Baghdad
Referee: Fahmi Al-Qaimaqchi (Iraq)

=== Group B ===
Muscat and Oman abandoned their first match against Libya with 10 minutes left due to a disputed decision while they were losing 21–0, and subsequently withdrew from the tournament.

Team	Pld	W	D	L	GF	GA	GD	Pts
Syria	3	2	1	0	11	1	+10	**5**
Libya	3	1	2	0	14	1	+13	**4**
Palestine	3	1	1	1	9	5	+4	**3**
North Yemen	3	0	0	3	0	27	–27	**0**
Muscat and Oman	Withdrew							

1 April 1966

Libya	1–1	Palestine
Al-Biski 35'		Al-Samari 75'

Al-Kashafa Stadium, Baghdad
Referee: Salih Faraj (Iraq)
2 April 1966

Syria	7–0	North Yemen
Alian 16'; Markarian 42', 44'; Haddad 52'; Kezberi 64', 66'; Idlibi 88'

Al-Kashafa Stadium, Baghdad
Referee: Fahmi Al-Qaimaqchi (Iraq)

3 April 1966

Libya	21–0 (Note: Muscat and Oman withdrew the tournament after its first match against Libya, protesting a penalty free-kick decision of the referee at 80'. The match and results were not counted.)	Muscat and Oman
Ben Soueid (?); Al-Biski (?); Al-Jahani (?); Ben Zayed (?)	Abandoned in 80'

Al-Kashafa Stadium, Baghdad
Referee: Rashad Hawasly (Syria)

4 April 1966

Syria	0–0	Libya

Al-Kashafa Stadium, Baghdad
Referee: Fahmi Al-Qaimaqchi (Iraq)
4 April 1966

Palestine	7–0	North Yemen
Al-Samari 28', 65', 86', 88'; Al-Arabi 75'; Al-Maghrebi 76'; Taha 82'

Al-Kashafa Stadium, Baghdad
Referee: Mamdouh Khourma (Jordan)

6 April 1966

Syria	4–1	Palestine
Kaoulekian 29', 51', 53'; Haddad 69'		Al-Maghrebi 47'

Al-Kashafa Stadium, Baghdad
Referee: Salih Faraj (Iraq)
6 April 1966

Libya	13–0	North Yemen
Ben Soueid 1', 24', 50', 54', 70'; Al-Biski 34', 40', 53', 63', 78'; Al-Ahwal 3', 19'; Al-Khatiti 61'

Al-Kut Stadium, Kut
Referee: Mamdouh Khourma (Jordan)

== Knockout stage ==
=== Bracket ===
Semi-finals
9 April – Baghdad
**Iraq**	**3**
Libya	1
9 April – Baghdad
**Syria**	**1**
Lebanon	0

Final
10 April – Baghdad
**Iraq**	**2**
Syria	1
Third place
10 April – Baghdad
**Libya**	**6**
Lebanon	1

=== Semi-finals ===
9 April 1966

Iraq	3–1	Libya
Mahmoud 12'; Balla 22' (pen.); Atta 74'		Al-Biski 65'

Al-Kashafa Stadium, Baghdad
Referee: Mamdouh Khourma (Jordan)

9 April 1966

Syria	1–0	Lebanon
Kaoulekian 48'

Al-Kashafa Stadium, Baghdad
Referee: Salih Faraj (Iraq)

=== Third place play-off ===
10 April 1966

Libya	6–1	Lebanon
Al-Biski 31', 33', 71'; Al-Jahani 42', 55'; Al-Ahwal 69'		El-Sharki 6'

Al-Kashafa Stadium, Baghdad
Referee: Rashad Hawasly (Syria)

=== Final ===
10 April 1966
18:00 UTC+3

Iraq	2–1	Syria
Ismail 65', 81'		Idlibi 33'

Al-Kashafa Stadium, Baghdad
Attendance: 20,000
Referee: Mamdouh Khourma (Jordan)

== Goalscorers ==
Libya's match against Muscat and Oman is not counted. There were 98 goals scored in 20 matches, for an average of 4.9 goals per match.

10 goals

- (Libya) Ali Al-Biski

8 goals

- (Kuwait) Abdulrahman Al-Dawla

5 goals

- (Iraq) Nouri Dhiab
- (Libya) Ahmed Ben Soueid
- (Palestine) Hosam Al-Samari

4 goals

- (Lebanon) Adnan "El-Sharki" Mekdash
- (Syria) Avadis Kaoulekian

3 goals

- (Iraq) Hisham Atta
- (Iraq) Gorgis Ismail
- (Jordan) Adel Issa
- (Libya) Ahmed Al-Ahwal

2 goals

- (Bahrain) Adnan Ayub
- (Bahrain) Salem "Saleem" Mubarak
- (Iraq) Amer Jameel
- (Lebanon) Joseph Abou Murad
- (Lebanon) Levon Altounian
- (Libya) Mahmoud Al-Jahani
- (Palestine) Ibrahim Al-Maghrebi
- (Syria) Azmi Haddad
- (Syria) Nureddin Idlibi
- (Syria) Ghasan Kezberi
- (Syria) Hagop Markarian

1 goal

- (Bahrain) Ahmed Salmeen
- (Bahrain) Naser Waleed
- (Bahrain) Hasan Zalekh
- (Iraq) Mahmoud Assad
- (Iraq) Hassan Balla
- (Iraq) Salman Dawood
- (Iraq) Qais Hameed
- (Iraq) Qasim Mahmoud
- (Iraq) Mohammed Najim
- (Iraq) Shidrak Yousif
- (Jordan) Mustafa Al-Adwan
- (Jordan) Ali Al-Shaqran
- (Kuwait) Mohammed Al-Khatib
- (Kuwait) Mohammed Al-Masoud
- (Lebanon) Mahmoud Berjaoui
- (Lebanon) Mohammed Chatila
- (Lebanon) Abraham Kasabian
- (Libya) Abdul-Kadir Al-Khatiti
- (Palestine) Mohammed Al-Arabi
- (Palestine) Omar Al-Sheikh Taha
- (Syria) Ahmed Alian
