= Mahmoud Assad =

Iraqi association football player

Personal information
- Full name: Mahmoud Assad
- Place of birth: Iraq
- Position: Forward

International career
| Years | Team | Apps | (Gls) |
| 1966–1967 | Iraq | | |

Mahmoud Assad (Arabic: مَحْمُود أَسَد) is a former Iraqi football forward who played for Iraq between 1966 and 1967. He played in the 1966 Arab Nations Cup and scored 1 goal.

== Career statistics ==
=== International goals ===
Scores and results list Iraq's goal tally first.

| No | Date | Venue | Opponent | Score | Result | Competition |
|---|---|---|---|---|---|---|
| 1. | 3 April 1966 | Al-Kashafa Stadium, Baghdad | Jordan | 1–0 | 2–1 | 1966 Arab Nations Cup |
