= Ali Al-Biski =

Libyan footballer (1941–2019)

Personal information
- Full name: Mohammed Ali Al-Dibiski
- Date of birth: 1941
- Place of birth: Tripoli, Libya
- Date of death: 24 April 2019 (aged 77–78)
- Place of death: Tunisia
- Position: Striker

Senior career*
Years	Team	Apps	(Gls)
1955–1964	Al-Tarsana		
- Al-Mashaal
1964–1966	Al-Madina		
1966–1968	Al-Ahli Tripoli		
1968–1970	Al-Ittihad Tripoli		

International career
1961–1970	Libya	44	(35)
- * Club domestic league appearances and goals

Mohammed Ali Al-Dibiski (Arabic: محمد علي الدبسكي; 1941 – 24 April 2019), commonly known as Ali Al-Biski (Arabic: علي البسكي), was a Libyan footballer who played as a striker. Although he did not score in FIFA-approved competitions due to Libya's lack of participation at the time, he is the Libya national team's all-time top scorer.

Al-Biski was the top scorer of the 1965 Pan Arab Games and the 1966 Arab Nations Cup, and praised for his teamwork, dribbling and positioning by the Egyptian media. Al-Biski was also twice the top scorer of the Libyan Premier League: in 1965 with Al-Madina and in 1968 with Al-Ahli Tripoli.

== Career statistics ==
=== International ===
Scores and results list Libya's goal tally first, score column indicates score after each Libya goal.

No.	Date	Venue	Opponent	Score	Result	Competition	Ref.
1	8 September 1961	Stade Mohammed V, Casablanca, Morocco	Saudi Arabia		5–1	1961 Pan Arab Games	
2	8 September 1961	Stade Mohammed V, Casablanca, Morocco	Saudi Arabia		5–1	1961 Pan Arab Games	
3	8 September 1961	Stade Mohammed V, Casablanca, Morocco	Saudi Arabia		5–1	1961 Pan Arab Games	
4	8 September 1961	Stade Mohammed V, Casablanca, Morocco	Saudi Arabia		5–1	1961 Pan Arab Games	
5	29 February 1964	7 October Stadium, Tripoli, Libya	Malta		2–2	1964 Tripoli Tournament	
6	14 November 1964	Kuwait University Stadium, Kuwait City, Kuwait	Lebanon		2–1	1964 Arab Nations Cup	
7	18 November 1964	Kuwait University Stadium, Kuwait City, Kuwait	Jordan		5–2	1964 Arab Nations Cup	
8	14 March 1965	7 October Stadium, Tripoli, Libya	Kuwait		4–1	1965 Tripoli Tournament	
9	2 September 1965	Zamalek Stadium, Cairo, Egypt	Muscat and Oman		15–1	1965 Pan Arab Games	
10	2 September 1965	Zamalek Stadium, Cairo, Egypt	Muscat and Oman		15–1	1965 Pan Arab Games	
11	2 September 1965	Zamalek Stadium, Cairo, Egypt	Muscat and Oman		15–1	1965 Pan Arab Games	
12	2 September 1965	Zamalek Stadium, Cairo, Egypt	Muscat and Oman		15–1	1965 Pan Arab Games	
13	6 September 1965	Zamalek Stadium, Cairo, Egypt	(Sultanate of Lahej) Lahej		16–0	1965 Pan Arab Games	
14	6 September 1965	Zamalek Stadium, Cairo, Egypt	(Sultanate of Lahej) Lahej		16–0	1965 Pan Arab Games	
15	6 September 1965	Zamalek Stadium, Cairo, Egypt	(Sultanate of Lahej) Lahej		16–0	1965 Pan Arab Games	
16	6 September 1965	Zamalek Stadium, Cairo, Egypt	(Sultanate of Lahej) Lahej		16–0	1965 Pan Arab Games	
17	9 September 1965	Zamalek Stadium, Cairo, Egypt	United Arab Republic		1–8	1965 Pan Arab Games	
18	10 September 1965	Zamalek Stadium, Cairo, Egypt	Palestine	1–0	4–2	1965 Pan Arab Games	
19	10 September 1965	Zamalek Stadium, Cairo, Egypt	Palestine	4–2	4–2	1965 Pan Arab Games	
20	12 March 1966	7 October Stadium, Tripoli, Libya	Morocco B		4–0	1966 Tripoli Tournament	
21	12 March 1966	7 October Stadium, Tripoli, Libya	Morocco B		4–0	1966 Tripoli Tournament	
22	12 March 1966	7 October Stadium, Tripoli, Libya	Morocco B		4–0	1966 Tripoli Tournament	
23	1 April 1966	Al-Kashafa Stadium, Baghdad, Iraq	Oman		21–0	1966 Arab Nations Cup	
24	1 April 1966	Al-Kashafa Stadium, Baghdad, Iraq	Oman		21–0	1966 Arab Nations Cup	
25	1 April 1966	Al-Kashafa Stadium, Baghdad, Iraq	Oman		21–0	1966 Arab Nations Cup	
26	1 April 1966	Al-Kashafa Stadium, Baghdad, Iraq	Oman		21–0	1966 Arab Nations Cup	
27	1 April 1966	Al-Kashafa Stadium, Baghdad, Iraq	Oman		21–0	1966 Arab Nations Cup	
28	1 April 1966	Al-Kashafa Stadium, Baghdad, Iraq	Oman		21–0	1966 Arab Nations Cup	
29	1 April 1966	Al-Kashafa Stadium, Baghdad, Iraq	Oman		21–0	1966 Arab Nations Cup	
30	6 April 1966	Al-Kashafa Stadium, Baghdad, Iraq	North Yemen		13–1	1966 Arab Nations Cup	
31	6 April 1966	Al-Kashafa Stadium, Baghdad, Iraq	North Yemen		13–1	1966 Arab Nations Cup	
32	6 April 1966	Al-Kashafa Stadium, Baghdad, Iraq	North Yemen		13–1	1966 Arab Nations Cup	
33	6 April 1966	Al-Kashafa Stadium, Baghdad, Iraq	North Yemen		13–1	1966 Arab Nations Cup	
34	6 April 1966	Al-Kashafa Stadium, Baghdad, Iraq	North Yemen		13–1	1966 Arab Nations Cup	
35	8 April 1966	Al-Kashafa Stadium, Baghdad, Iraq	Iraq		1–3	1966 Arab Nations Cup	
36	10 April 1966	Al-Kashafa Stadium, Baghdad, Iraq	Lebanon		6–1	1966 Arab Nations Cup	
37	10 April 1966	Al-Kashafa Stadium, Baghdad, Iraq	Lebanon		6–1	1966 Arab Nations Cup	
38	10 April 1966	Al-Kashafa Stadium, Baghdad, Iraq	Lebanon		6–1	1966 Arab Nations Cup	
39	March 1967	7 October Stadium, Tripoli, Libya	Libya B		5–1	1967 Tripoli Tournament	
40	March 1967	7 October Stadium, Tripoli, Libya	Libya B		5–1	1967 Tripoli Tournament	
41	March 1967	7 October Stadium, Tripoli, Libya	Libya B		5–1	1967 Tripoli Tournament	

== See also ==
- List of footballers who achieved hat-trick records
