= Shidrak Yousif =

Iraqi footballer (1942–2025)

Shidrak Yousif شدراك يوسف
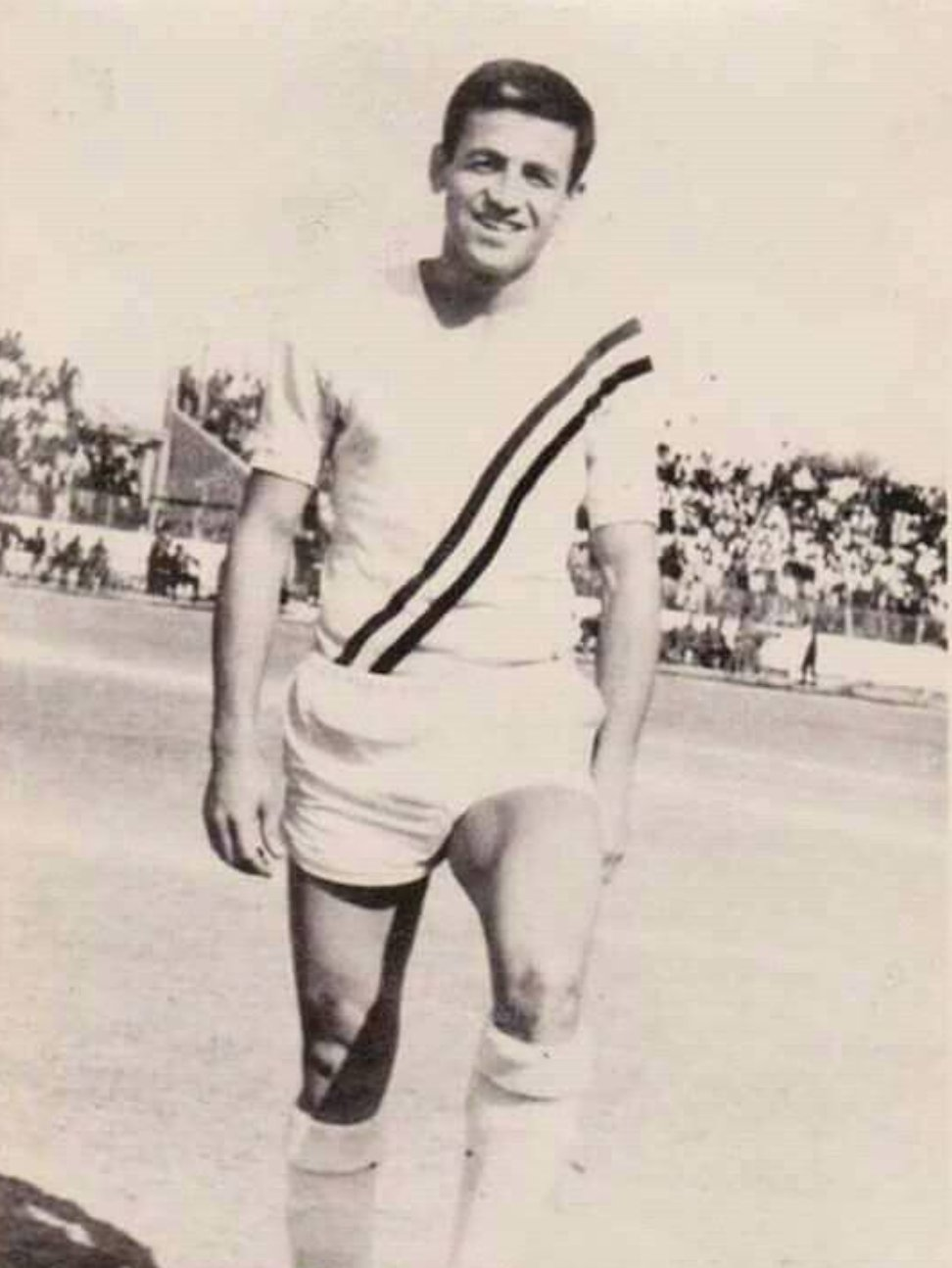

Personal information
- Date of birth: July 1942
- Place of birth: Habbaniyah, Iraq
- Date of death: 5 August 2025 (aged 83)
- Position: Midfielder

International career
Years	Team	Apps	(Gls)
1965–1973	Iraq	31	(2)

Shidrak Yousif (Arabic: شدراك يوسف; July 1942 – 5 August 2025) was an Iraqi footballer and sports commentator. A midfielder, he played for the Iraq national football team from 1965 to 1973, being a member of two Arab Cup championship teams as well as their team at the 1972 AFC Asian Cup. After his playing career, he served as coach of the Iraq women's national football team and was a well-known sports commentator in the country.

== Biography ==
Yousif was born in July 1942 in Habbaniyah, Iraq. He was a member of the Assyrian ethnic group and was considered one of the most famous Assyrian sportspeople. He played as a midfielder and started his football career with a local team in Habbaniyah. He played for several clubs, including Al Ahly in Baghdad and Ramadi Education, before finishing his career with a club in the Iraqi Third Division. He was regarded as one of Iraq's star football players during the 1960s and was known for his "technical skills and consistent performance".

Yousif debuted for the Iraq national football team in 1965. He was a member of the team as they won the 1964 and 1966 Arab Cups. He played a major role for the 1966 Arab Cup-winning team and was named the best player of the tournament. He remained with the national team through 1973 and participated in the 1972 AFC Asian Cup. Yousif retired from the national team after 1974 FIFA World Cup qualification and retired from playing entirely in 1974 or 1975. In his national team career, he appeared in 31 matches and scored two goals. He was also a member of the Iraq military national football team, helping them win the 1972 World Military Cup. After his retirement from playing, Yousif entered coaching and led several teams including the Iraq women's national football team before retiring from coaching in 1979.

Yousif then worked as a sports commentator, becoming one of the most well-known Iraqi sports media figures. According to Al Jazeera, he "was distinguished by his unique style and endearing voice, which has remained in the minds of generations. His voice was an integral part of the football enjoyment for the Iraqi public". He was known for having a "remarkable memory" and his "exceptional precision" in remembering statistics and moments from Iraqi football history, according to the Syriac Press. In the 1990s, he served as director of the Iraqi Sports Channel, led the sports department at Ishtar TV, and also hosted a television show called Sports Bag. He later moved to Ankawa where he founded a youth football academy. Yousif died on 5 August 2025, following a long illness, aged 83. (Note: Some sources mislabel his age as "81".)
