= Al Ahly SC (Benghazi) =

Association football club in Libya

Al Ahly Benghazi الأهلي بنغازي
- Full name: Al Ahly Sports Cultural & Social Club النادي الأهلي الرياضي الثقافي الاجتماعي
- Nicknames: The Long Journey; The Butchers
- Founded: 19 April 1947; 79 years ago
- Ground: Martyrs of February Stadium
- Capacity: 10,550
- Chairman: Khaled Mohamed
- Manager: Zoran Manojlovic
- League: Libyan Premier League
Home colours	Away colours

Al Ahly Sports Cultural and Social Club (Arabic: النادي الأهلي الرياضي الثقافي الاجتماعي), also known as Al Ahly Benghazi, is a Libyan sports club based in Benghazi. Al Ahly has its roots in a political party, the Omar al Mukhtar society.

== History ==
Al Ahly Benghazi was made a professional football club in 1947, although they had existed years before then.

In 2000, Al Ahly Benghazi's headquarters and training complex was demolished by the Libyan government, supposedly destroying records, trophies and medals of the club. The demolition was allegedly carried out in response to Al Ahly Benghazi fans insulting Saadi Gaddafi by dressing a donkey in a shirt baring his squad number, but other sources pointed to the burning a few days before of the Libyan Football Federation offices in Benghazi by angry Al Ahly Benghazi fans as the matter. The club was then given an indefinite ban which lasted until 2005. Saadi Gaddafi had denied all the allegations.

The club has been given 77 acres (310,000 m^{2}) of land for a new ground by the Libyan Jamahiriya government, although it cannot afford to develop it.

== Crest ==
Former logo

Note: Al Ahly SC (Benghazi) is the only club in Libya which has a star in its logo before reaching 10 league titles.

== Squad ==
=== Current squad ===
As of 20 September 2026

Note: Flags indicate national team as defined under FIFA eligibility rules; some limited exceptions apply. Players may hold more than one non-FIFA nationality.

No.	Pos.	Nation	Player
1	GK	LBA	Murad Al-Wuheeshi (captain)
—	FW	TUN	Firas Chaouat
—	MF	BFA	Trova Boni
—	MF	ALG	Islam Merili
6	MF	LBA	Osama Al-Sarit
—	MF	MAR	Amine Aboulfath
8	MF	LBA	Abdallah Dagou
—	FW	COD	Makabi Lilepo
10	MF	MOZ	Luís Miquissone
—	MF	LBA	Fahad Al-Mesmari
12	GK	LBA	Redwan Tawfiq
—	FW	LBA	Ahmed Mekari
14	FW	LBA	Waleed Al-Murghani
15	DF	LBA	Mohamed Othman Karoui

No.	Pos.	Nation	Player
16	DF	LBA	Mohammed Al-Tarhouni
17	MF	LBA	Ashraf Al-Maghasi
18	MF	LBA	Hussain Taktak
19	MF	LBA	Hamam Hamza
20	MF	LBA	Salem Boushaala
21	DF	LBA	Malek Ben Ismael
22	FW	COL	Santiago Muñoz
24	DF	LBA	Salah Fakroun
25	MF	LBA	Islam Nasr
28	GK	LBA	Zekeriya Girada
29	GK	LBA	Farag Fakroun
31	FW	LBA	Mousa Al-Agouri
32	FW	LBA	Hamza Wanis
33	MF	LBA	Mohammed Wanis
35	MF	LBA	Nouredinne Al-Madani

=== Staff ===
- (Egypt) Moamen Soliman Head coach

== History ==
=== Head coaches ===
- (England) Thomson (Late 60's)
- (Algeria) Said Brahimi (1965–??)
- (Egypt) Saleh El Wahsh (1969–72)
- (Romania) Nicolae Oaidă (1972–74)
- (Bulgaria) Ivan Deyanov (1977–78)
- (Hungary) Flórián Albert (1978–85)
- (Libya) Abdeljelil Al Hashani (1985–??)
- (Libya) Ahmed Ben Soueid (1987–88)
- (Socialist Federal Republic of Yugoslavia) ?? (19??–91)
- (Libya) Abdeljelil Al Hashani (1991–??)

- (Libya) Ahmed Ben Soueid (1994–95)
- (Algeria) Saïd Amara (1996–99)
- (Egypt) Hassan Shehata (1999)
- Club not recognised by LFF (1999–04)
- (Libya) Ahmed Ben Soueid (2004–05)
- (Algeria) Tayeb Bouhafs (2005–07)
- (Algeria) Abderrahmane Mehdaoui (2007–08)
- (Serbia) Dragan Gugleta (2008–09)
- (Brazil) Dutra Santos (Aug–Nov 2009)
- (Serbia) Dragan Gugleta (Dec 2009–2010)

- (Tunisia) Tariq Thabit (2010–2011)
- (Libya) Faisal Bushala (2012)
- (Tunisia) Nasreddine Nabi (2013)
- (Egypt) Tarek El Ashry (2013–14)
- (Tunisia) Tariq Thabit (2015–16)
- (Croatia) Rodion Gačanin (Sep 2021–Jun 2022)
- (Tunisia) Faouzi Benzarti (Jun–Jul 2022)
- (Tunisia) Chiheb Ellili (Aug–Dec 2022)
- (Tunisia) Lassaad Dridi (Dec 2022–present)

=== Team captains since founding ===
- (Libya) Salem Al-Bargathy (1950–56)
- (Libya) Mahmod Al-Zaroq Boseta (1956–??)
- (Libya) Abdelsalam Musa Goada
- (Libya) Mohammed Al-Haddad (Qa'am)
- (Libya) Mostafa Al-Makki (19??-67)
- (Libya) Ahmed Al-Tharat (Beonedo)
- (Libya) Emhamed Al-Shrif
- (Libya) Taher Khawaja
- (Libya) Ali Boaod
- (Libya) Abdelkader Al-Khateti
- (Libya) (Libya) (Libya) Ahmed Ben Soueid
- (Libya) Naji Al-Ma'adani
- (Libya) Ibrahim Kelfa
- (Libya) Mohamed Al-Affas
- (Libya) Abdeljaliel Al-Hashani
- (Libya) Faraj Sati

- (Libya) Saad Al Fazani
- (Libya) Al-Faitori Ragab
- (Libya) Ali Mersal
- (Libya) Abdelfatah Al-Farjani
- (Libya) Ramzi Al Kowafi
- (Libya) (Libya) Ali Al-Beshari
- (Libya) Khaled Al Zawi
- (Libya) Mohamed Al-Beshari
- (Libya) Wanes Khaer
- (Libya) Fathi Jouma
- (Libya) Naji Al-Moghrabi
- (Libya) Khaled Al-Abdili
- (Libya) Housien Omran
- (Libya) Kahled Al-Mesalati
- (Libya) Faisal Bushala
- (Libya) Jalal Al-Mesalati

- (Libya) Rezgala Abdu
- (Libya) (Libya) Moataz Ben Amer (2006–)
- (Libya) (Libya) Ahmed Zuway
- (Libya) Ahmed Al-Abidi
- (Libya) Fathi Rahel
- (Libya) Abdelrahman Al-Omami
- (Libya) Ahmed Al-Amari
- (Libya) Ibrahim Al-Abidi
- (Libya) Waled Al-Derisi
- (Libya) Hashem Dala
- (Libya) Ahmed Ahwaidi
- (Libya) Abdeljawad Rezeq
- (Libya) Mutasembellah El-Taib (??-2019)
- (Libya) Morad El-Wheshy (2022-Present Time)

=== Former players ===
- (Libya) Ali Al-Beshari

== Honours ==
=== National titles ===
- Libyan Premier League:
  - Winners (4):1969–70, 1971–72, 1974–75, 1991–92
  - Runners-up (11): 1963–64, 1968–69, 1970–71, 1972–73, 1975–76, 1984–85, 1987–88, 1998–99, 2008–09, 2009–10
- Libyan Cup
  - Winners (3): 1987, 1991, 1996
- Libyan Eastern Championship - League of Cyrenaica
  - Winners (6): 1957, 1960, 1963, 1964, 1968, 1970
- Benghazi Championship
  - Winners (4): 1950, 1951, 1954, 1956

=== International titles ===
- North African Cup Winners Cup
  - Runners-up: 2009

== Performance in CAF competitions ==
- African Cup of Champions Clubs / CAF Champions League: 7 appearances

1971 – First Round
1973 – Second Round
1976 – First Round
2010 – Preliminary Round

2014 – Group stage – Quarter-finals
2018–19 – First Round
2020–21 – First Round

- CAF Confederation Cup: 1 appearance

2009 – First Round

- CAF Cup: 1 appearance

1999 – First Round
