= Othman Al-Ossimi =

Kuwaiti footballer

Personal information
- Full name: Othman Saud Abdullah Al-Ossimi
- Date of birth: 1941
- Place of birth: Kuwait City, Kuwait
- Date of death: 31 October 2019 (aged 77–78)
- Place of death: Cairo, Egypt
- Position: Attacking midfielder

Senior career*
Years	Team	Apps	(Gls)
1960–1971	Qadsia SC		

International career
1960–1970	Kuwait		
- Kuwait military national football team
- * Club domestic league appearances and goals

Othman Saud Abdullah Al-Ossimi (Arabic: عثمان سعود عبد الله العصيمي; 1941 – 31 October 2019) was a former Kuwaiti footballer. He played from 1960 until 1971 for Qadsia SC. He was the top scorer in the Kuwait Premier League in 1963–64 season.

Othman also played for the Kuwait national football team.
