= 7 October Stadium =

Football stadium in Tripoli, Libya

Coordinates: 32.8883°N 13.1652°E

7 October Stadium is a grass football stadium based in center of Tripoli, Libya. The stadium holds 5,000 people and was built in 1939. It was named Municipal Stadium and was the only football stadium in Tripoli, Libya before the June 11 Stadium was built in the 1970s. It is being used now as training ground for Al-Ittihad Club.
