= 1964 Arab Cup =

2nd Arab Cup, held in Kuwait

Tournament details
- Host country: Kuwait
- Dates: 13–20 November
- Teams: 5 (from 2 confederations)
- Venue: 1 (in 1 host city)

Final positions
- Champions: Iraq (1st title)
- Runners-up: Libya
- Third place: Lebanon
- Fourth place: Kuwait

Tournament statistics
- Matches played: 10
- Goals scored: 27 (2.7 per match)
- Top scorer(s): (Libya) Ahmed Ben Soueid (5 goals)

The 1964 Arab Cup was the second edition of the Arab Cup hosted by Kuwait. Iraq won the tournament for the first time. Libya finished second while Lebanon finished third.

== Teams ==
Five teams took part in the tournament: the hosts Kuwait along with Iraq, Libya, Jordan and Lebanon. Five other teams were invited but did not participate in the tournament: the defending champions Tunisia because of national elections, Morocco and Sudan due to other engagements, United Arab Republic because it had just finished its participation at the Olympic Games, and Syria who withdrew for financial reasons.

The five participating teams were:

| Team | Qualified as | Previous appearances in tournament (Note: Bold indicates champion for that year, Italic indicates host.) |
|---|---|---|
| Kuwait | Hosts | 1 (1963) |
| Iraq | Invitee | 0 (debut) |
| Jordan | Invitee | 1 (1963) |
| Lebanon | Invitee | 1 (1963) |
| Libya | Invitee | 0 (debut) |

== Venues ==
| Kuwait City | 1964 Arab Cup is located in Kuwait |
| Shuwaikh High School Stadium | 1964 Arab Cup is located in Kuwait |
| Capacity: **16,000** | 1964 Arab Cup is located in Kuwait |

== Final tournament ==
| Team | Pld | W | D | L | GF | GA | GD | Pts |
|---|---|---|---|---|---|---|---|---|
| Iraq | 4 | 3 | 1 | 0 | 6 | 2 | +4 | **7** |
| Libya | 4 | 2 | 2 | 0 | 9 | 5 | +4 | **6** |
| Lebanon | 4 | 1 | 1 | 2 | 4 | 5 | –1 | **3** |
| Kuwait | 4 | 1 | 1 | 2 | 5 | 5 | 0 | **3** |
| Jordan | 4 | 0 | 1 | 3 | 3 | 10 | –7 | **1** |

13 November 1964

| Kuwait | 0–1 | Iraq |
|---|---|---|
| | | Ismail 60' |

Shuwaikh High School Stadium, Kuwait City
Referee: Sobhi Naseer (Egypt)
13 November 1964

| Jordan | 0–0 | Lebanon |

Shuwaikh High School Stadium, Kuwait City
Referee: Fahmi Al-Qaimaqchi (Iraq)

15 November 1964

| Iraq | 1–0 | Lebanon |
|---|---|---|
| Tabra 25' |

Shuwaikh High School Stadium, Kuwait City
Referee: Hédi Attig (Tunisia)
15 November 1964

| Kuwait | 1–1 | Libya |
|---|---|---|
| Al-Ossimi 78' | | Ben Soueid 47' |

Shuwaikh High School Stadium, Kuwait City
Referee: Sarkis Demirdjian (Lebanon)

16 November 1964

| Iraq | 1–1 | Libya |
|---|---|---|
| Atta 70' | | Ben Soueid 17' |

Shuwaikh High School Stadium, Kuwait City
Referee: Sobhi Naseer (Egypt)
16 November 1964

| Kuwait | 2–0 | Jordan |
|---|---|---|
| Al-Dawla 13', 61' |

Shuwaikh High School Stadium, Kuwait City
Referee: Hédi Attig (Tunisia)

18 November 1964

| Libya | 2–1 | Lebanon |
|---|---|---|
| Ben Soueid 24', 66' | | Chatila 89' |

Shuwaikh High School Stadium, Kuwait City
Referee: Mohammed Youssef (Sudan)
18 November 1964

| Iraq | 3–1 | Jordan |
|---|---|---|
| Atta 15', 37'; Mahmoud 31' | | Al-Odwan 80' |

Shuwaikh High School Stadium, Kuwait City
Referee: Sobhi Naseer (Egypt)

20 November 1964

| Libya | 5–2 | Jordan |
|---|---|---|
| Al-Sanoussi 7', 53'; Al-Biski 22'; Ben Soueid 42'; Al-Ahwal 83' | | Zaghloul 25'; Al-Odwan 69' |

Shuwaikh High School Stadium, Kuwait City
Referee: Mohammed Youssef (Sudan)
20 November 1964

| Kuwait | 2–3 | Lebanon |
|---|---|---|
| Al-Khashram 60'; Al-Masoud 69' | | Chatila 3'; Shaker 64'; Nassar 72' |

Shuwaikh High School Stadium, Kuwait City
Referee: Fahmi Al-Qaimaqchi (Iraq)

== Goalscorers ==
There were 27 goals scored in 10 matches, for an average of 2.7 goals per match.

5 goals

- (Libya) Ahmed Ben Soueid

3 goals

- (Iraq) Hisham Atta

2 goals

- (Jordan) Mustafa Al-Adwan
- (Kuwait) Abdulrahman Al-Dawla
- (Lebanon) Mohammed Chatila
- (Libya) Hassan Al-Sanoussi

1 goal

- (Iraq) Shakir Ismail
- (Iraq) Qasim Mahmoud
- (Iraq) Shamil Tabra
- (Jordan) Tony Zaghloul
- (Kuwait) Ibrahim Al-Khashram
- (Kuwait) Mohammed Al-Masoud
- (Kuwait) Othman Al-Ossimi
- (Lebanon) Ragheb Shaker
- (Lebanon) Samir Elias Nassar
- (Libya) Ahmad Al-Ahwal
- (Libya) Ali Al-Biski
