= Ahmed Ben Soueid =

Libyan footballer and manager (born 1946)

Personal information
- Full name: Ahmed Ben Soueid
- Date of birth: 1946 (age 79–80)
- Place of birth: Benghazi, Libya
- Position: Forward

Youth career
- 1958–1961: Al-Ahly Benghazi

Senior career*
Years	Team	Apps	(Gls)
1961–1978	Al-Ahly Benghazi		(128)

International career
1964–1977	Libya		(50)

Managerial career
- 1989: Libya
- * Club domestic league appearances and goals

Ahmed Ben Soueid (born 1946) is a Libyan professional football player and manager.

== Club career ==
A native of Benghazi, Ben Soueid is one of the best players in the history of Libyan football. Having played his entire career with the team Al-Ahly SC (Benghazi), it is famous for the club in the 1960s, with whom he became the top scorer in its history. During the 1963–64 and 1964–65 seasons, he was elected best scorer of the national championship with 19 and 18 goals.

== International career ==
Ben Soueid represented Libya between 1964 and 1977, and he scored 50 goals for the national team. He also holds the Libyan record for the most goals in a single match when he scored nine goals against Oman in the 1966 Arab Cup. (Note: Oman withdrew the tournament after its first match against Libya, protesting a penalty free-kick decision of the referee at 80'. The match and results were not counted.)

== Managerial career ==
In 1989, he coached the Libya national football team.
