= 2005 African Youth Championship squads =

This article will display the squads for the 2005 African Youth Championship. Only players born on or after 1 January 1985 were eligible to play.

== Egypt ==
No.	Pos.	Player	Date of birth (age)	Caps	Club
		Hamada Shaaban	1 October 1985 (aged 19)		(Egypt) El-Mansoura
		Nano	24 March 1985 (aged 19)		(Egypt) Al-Ahly
		Abdelaziz Tawfik	24 May 1986 (aged 18)		(Egypt) El-Mansoura
		Hossam Ashour	9 March 1986 (aged 18)		(Egypt) Al-Ahly
		Alaa El-Masry	3 March 1985 (aged 19)		(Egypt) Al-Mokawloon Al-Arab
		Abdelilah Galal	20 January 1986 (aged 18)		(Egypt) Al-Ahly
		Ahmed Farag	20 May 1986 (aged 18)		(France) FC Sochaux-Montbéliard
		Ahmed Darwish	15 January 1985 (aged 20)		(Egypt) Baladia Mah.
		Hossam Nasr	30 August 1985 (aged 19)		(Egypt) El-Zamalek
		Shikabala	5 March 1986 (aged 18)		(Egypt) El-Zamalek
		Abdallah El Said	13 July 1985 (aged 19)		(Egypt) Ismaily SC
		Abdallah Abdou	10 May 1985 (aged 19)		(Egypt) Ismaily SC
		Karim Zekry	10 May 1985 (aged 19)		(Egypt) El-Masry
		Ahmed Magdy	24 May 1986 (aged 18)		(Egypt) Al-Ahly
		Islam Siam	13 February 1985 (aged 19)		(Egypt) Al-Mokawloon Al-Arab
		Mohamed Ibrahim	9 February 1985 (aged 19)		(Egypt) El-Shams
		Amr El Halwani	15 March 1985 (aged 19)		(Egypt) Al-Ahly
		Ali Bekhit	12 August 1985 (aged 19)		(Egypt) Ismaily SC

== Lesotho ==
No.	Pos.	Player	Date of birth (age)	Caps	Club
		Mpiti Thamae	24 June 1985 (aged 19)		(Lesotho) Likhopo
		Ralekoti Mokhahlane	3 June 1986 (aged 18)		(Lesotho) Likhopo
		Lebohang Nkakole	27 December 1988 (aged 16)		(Lesotho) Lioli
		Lereko Matsipa	6 August 1987 (aged 17)		(Lesotho) Likhopo
		Thabiso Maile	27 January 1987 (aged 17)		(Lesotho) Likhopo
		Motlalepula Mofolo	7 September 1986 (aged 18)		(Lesotho) Lioli
		Sefuli Ntoi	9 January 1985 (aged 20)		(Lesotho) Lifefo
		Tefo Maipato	9 March 1986 (aged 18)		(South Africa) Orlando Pirates
		Nathnael Ncheba	12 December 1989 (aged 15)		(South Africa) Orlando Pirates
		Katleho Moleko	24 August 1986 (aged 18)		(South Africa) Orlando Pirates
		Paul Lehloka	21 October 1986 (aged 18)		(Lesotho) Likhopo
		Thabo Mokhele	18 April 1986 (aged 18)		(Lesotho) Matlama
		Phillimon Mokhesi	17 May 1985 (aged 19)		(Ivory Coast) Stella
		Bokang Mothoana	9 December 1987 (aged 17)		(Lesotho) Likhopo
		Lintho Korie	7 September 1986 (aged 18)		(Lesotho) Lioli
		Dlomo Monaphathi	9 September 1987 (aged 17)		(Lesotho) Matlama
		Lawrence Molengoane	30 December 1986 (aged 18)		(Lesotho) Matlama
		Justice Teele	28 December 1986 (aged 18)		(Lesotho) Likhopo

== Ivory Coast ==
No.	Pos.	Player	Date of birth (age)	Caps	Club
1	GK	Vincent Angban	4 February 1987 (aged 17)		(Ivory Coast) Rio Anyama
2	FW	Abdramane Diaby	19 December 1986 (aged 18)		(Ivory Coast) Sabé de Bouna
3	DF	Sol Bamba	13 January 1985 (aged 20)		(France) Paris Saint-Germain
4	DF	Benjamin Angoua	28 November 1986 (aged 18)		(Ivory Coast) Africa Sports
5	DF	Bakary Soro	5 December 1985 (aged 19)		(Ivory Coast) ASEC Mimosas
6	MF	Bamba Moussa	6 January 1985 (aged 20)		(Ivory Coast) Jeunesse Club d'Abidjan
7	DF	Souleymane Barry	22 March 1986 (aged 18)		(Ivory Coast) Issia Wazy
8	MF	Alex Somian	9 June 1986 (aged 18)		(Ivory Coast) Jeunesse Club d'Abidjan
9	FW	Ibrahima Aka	5 March 1987 (aged 17)		(Ivory Coast) Issia Wazy
10	MF	Anthony Moura-Komenan	20 January 1986 (aged 18)		(France) Bordeaux
11	DF	Ollo Kambou	27 November 1986 (aged 18)		(Ivory Coast) Stade d'Abidjan
12	FW	Kévin Kouakou	24 April 1985 (aged 19)		(Ivory Coast) Bingerville
13	MF	Emmanuel Koné	31 December 1986 (aged 18)		(Ivory Coast) ASEC Mimosas
14	FW	Yedi Zahiri	2 September 1985 (aged 19)		(France) Rouen
15	MF	Herman Kouamé	31 December 1985 (aged 19)		(France) Lens
16	GK	Bebe Ollekam	25 November 1985 (aged 19)		(Ivory Coast) US Koumassi
17	DF	Charles Touah	30 December 1986 (aged 18)		(Ivory Coast) Stella Club d'Adjamé
18	FW	Sekou Cissé	23 May 1985 (aged 19)		(Netherlands) Roda JC

== Benin ==
No.	Pos.	Player	Date of birth (age)	Caps	Club
1	GK	Samiou Yessoufou (†)	11 July 1986 (aged 18)		(Benin) Buffles
2	DF	Charaf Chitou	21 September 1987 (aged 17)		(Benin) Université Nationale du Bénin FC
3	MF	Oscar Olou	16 November 1987 (aged 17)		(Benin) Mogas 90
4	DF	Pascal Hountonto	20 November 1985 (aged 19)		(Benin) Soleil FC
5	DF	Safradine Traoré	31 May 1986 (aged 18)		(Benin) Buffles
6	MF	Florent Raimy	7 February 1986 (aged 18)		(France) Sedan
7	MF	Romuald Boco	8 July 1985 (aged 19)		(France) Niort
8	MF	Mathieu Adeniyi	26 April 1987 (aged 17)		(France) Rennes
9	MF	Ademola Olaofe	30 October 1985 (aged 19)		(Benin) Soleil FC
10	FW	Abdoulaye Ouzérou	24 October 1985 (aged 19)		(Benin) Buffles
11	FW	Abou Maiga	20 September 1985 (aged 19)		(France) Créteil
12	MF	Coffi Agbessi	5 December 1985 (aged 19)		(Libya) Al Olympique
13	FW	Youssouf Nassirou	14 November 1986 (aged 18)		(Benin) Soleil FC
14	FW	Bachirou Osseni	15 September 1985 (aged 19)		(Benin) Soleil FC
15	FW	Razak Omotoyossi	8 October 1985 (aged 19)		(Benin) JS Pobè
16	GK	Yoann Djidonou	17 May 1986 (aged 18)		(France) Racing Club de Paris
17	MF	Soule Abiola	25 July 1987 (aged 17)		(Benin) Soleil FC
18	MF	Séïdath Tchomogo	13 August 1985 (aged 19)		(Benin) Lions de l'Atakory

== Morocco ==
No.	Pos.	Player	Date of birth (age)	Caps	Club
1	GK	Mohammed Bourkadi	22 February 1985 (aged 19)		(Morocco) MAS Fez
2	DF	Hamza Hajji	5 February 1986 (aged 18)		(Morocco) Wydad Casablanca
3	DF	Chakib Benzoukane	7 August 1986 (aged 18)		(Morocco) Kawkab Marrakech
4	DF	Karim Azizou	20 January 1985 (aged 19)		(France) Bordeaux
5	DF	Youssef Rabeh	13 April 1985 (aged 19)		(Morocco) FUS Rabat
6	DF	Abderrahmane Mssassi	24 March 1985 (aged 19)		(Morocco) MAS Fez
7	FW	Abdessalam Benjelloun	28 January 1985 (aged 19)		(Morocco) MAS Fez
8	MF	Karim Miftal	29 October 1985 (aged 19)		(France) Niort
9	FW	Mouhcine Iajour	14 May 1985 (aged 19)		(Morocco) Raja Casablanca
10	MF	Rachid Tiberkanine	28 March 1985 (aged 19)		(Netherlands) Ajax Amsterdam
11	FW	Tarik Bendamou	14 January 1985 (aged 20)		(Morocco) Raja Casablanca
12	GK	Youssef El Abdallaoui	1 February 1985 (aged 19)		(Morocco) Widad Fez
13	DF	Zakariae El Ghadi	27 June 1985 (aged 19)		(Morocco) MAS Fez
14	FW	Nabil El Zhar	27 August 1986 (aged 18)		(France) Saint-Étienne
15	MF	Rida Lah Douliazale	3 September 1985 (aged 19)		(Morocco) Wydad Casablanca
16	FW	Abdessamad Benhalib	19 October 1986 (aged 18)		(Morocco) Wydad Casablanca
17	MF	Yassine Zouchou	26 July 1985 (aged 19)		(Morocco) Wydad Casablanca
18	MF	Brahim El Bahri	26 March 1986 (aged 18)		(Morocco) FAR Rabat

== Angola ==
No.	Pos.	Player	Date of birth (age)	Caps	Club
1	GK	Guilherme Zinga	26 December 1985 (aged 19)		(Angola) Atlético de Luanda
2		Simão Bunga	14 July 1985 (aged 19)		(Angola) 1° de Agosto
3		Osvaldo Domingos	10 March 1986 (aged 18)		(Angola) 1° de Agosto
4		Michel Vuta	25 January 1985 (aged 19)		(Germany) 1. SC Feucht
5		Francisco Vicente	15 October 1985 (aged 19)		(Angola) Atlético de Luanda
6		Emílio Sebastião	8 April 1986 (aged 18)		Joca Sport
7	FW	Job	27 September 1987 (aged 17)		(Angola) Atlético Sport
8		Patrick Teca	19 September 1985 (aged 19)		(Portugal) Seixal
9		Paulino Miguel	17 October 1986 (aged 18)		(Angola) 1° de Agosto
10		Lucas Huango	13 March 1985 (aged 19)		(Angola) Académica do Lobito
11		Odymir Bregasha	15 December 1985 (aged 19)		(Angola) Interclube
12	GK	Mário Hipólito	1 June 1985 (aged 19)		(Angola) Interclube
13		Hamlet Campos	16 June 1985 (aged 19)		(Angola) Atlético de Luanda
14		Simão Soares	14 October 1986 (aged 18)		(Angola) Santos
15		Joaquim Nzamba	27 March 1986 (aged 18)		(Angola) Flaminguinhos
16		Edvaldo Pina	4 September 1985 (aged 19)		(Angola) Académica do Lobito
17		Manuel Zundo	7 September 1987 (aged 17)		(Angola) Santos
18	MF	Manucho Diniz	4 June 1986 (aged 18)		(Angola) 1° de Agosto

== Nigeria ==
No.	Pos.	Player	Date of birth (age)	Caps	Club
1	GK	Ambruse Vanzekin	14 July 1986 (aged 18)		(Nigeria) Bendel Insurance
2	DF	Kennedy Chinwo	29 December 1985 (aged 19)		(Nigeria) Dolphins
3	DF	Taye Taiwo	16 April 1985 (aged 19)		(Nigeria) Lobi Stars
4	DF	Onyekachi Apam	30 December 1986 (aged 18)		(Nigeria) Enugu Rangers
5	DF	Monday James	19 October 1986 (aged 18)		(Nigeria) Bendel Insurance
6	DF	Yinka Adedeji	24 March 1985 (aged 19)		(Nigeria) Pepsi Academy
7	MF	Bernard Okorowanta	11 December 1986 (aged 18)		(Israel) Maccabi Tel Aviv
8	MF	Daddy Bazuaye	11 December 1988 (aged 16)		(Nigeria) Bendel Insurance
9	FW	Victor Obinna	25 March 1987 (aged 17)		(Nigeria) Enyimba
10	FW	Isaac Promise	2 December 1987 (aged 17)		(Nigeria) Gray's International
11	FW	Solomon Okoronkwo	2 March 1987 (aged 17)		(Germany) Hertha BSC
12	GK	Daniel Akpeyi	3 August 1986 (aged 18)		(Nigeria) Gabros International
13	DF	Olubayo Adefemi	10 August 1985 (aged 19)		(Israel) Hapoel Jerusalem
14	MF	David Abwo	10 May 1986 (aged 18)		(Nigeria) Enyimba
15	MF	Johnbull Edeki	28 March 1985 (aged 19)		(Nigeria) Bendel Insurance
16	DF	Dele Adeleye	25 December 1988 (aged 16)		(Nigeria) Shooting Stars
17	FW	Ifeanyi Obediah	27 July 1985 (aged 19)		(Nigeria) Enyimba
18	MF	Kola Anubi	24 March 1987 (aged 17)		(Nigeria) Bendel Insurance

== Mali ==
No.	Pos.	Player	Date of birth (age)	Caps	Club
1	GK	Noumouke Traoré	1 September 1985 (aged 19)		(Mali) Onze Créateurs
2	DF	Adama Tamboura	18 May 1985 (aged 19)		(Mali) Real Bamako
3	DF	Yacouba Sanogo	25 July 1986 (aged 18)		(Mali) Onze Créateurs
4		Issa Traoré	2 January 1987 (aged 18)		(Mali) Djoliba AC
5	MF	Sekou Bagayoko	31 December 1987 (aged 17)		(Mali) Djoliba AC
6	MF	Lassana Fané	11 November 1987 (aged 17)		(Mali) Djoliba AC
7	FW	Kalifa Dembelé	13 September 1987 (aged 17)		(Mali) CO Bamako
8	MF	Alphousseyni Keita	13 November 1985 (aged 19)		(Mali) CO Bamako
9	MF	Moriba Diop	21 May 1985 (aged 19)		(Mali) Stade Malien
10	MF	Oumar Kanté	9 October 1987 (aged 17)		(Mali) Centre Salif Keita
11	FW	Boubacar Kébé	10 May 1987 (aged 17)		(France) Bordeaux
12	DF	Amadou Sidibé	19 February 1986 (aged 18)		(Mali) CO Bamako
13	FW	Modibo Maïga	3 September 1987 (aged 17)		(Mali) Stade Malien
14	DF	Demba Barry	11 April 1987 (aged 17)		(Mali) Real Bamako
15		Alassane Keita	13 November 1985 (aged 19)		(Mali) CO Bamako
16	GK	Abdoulaye Samake	29 April 1987 (aged 17)		(Mali) AS Bamako
17	MF	Lamine Diawara	18 May 1986 (aged 18)		(Mali) Débo Club
18		Dramane Traoré	20 January 1987 (aged 17)		(Mali) Onze Créateurs
