= Football at the 2008 Summer Olympics – Men's African Qualifiers =

2008 Summer Olympics – Men's Football African Qualifiers
- Dates: 1 September 2006 – 26 March 2008

The African Men's Olympic Qualifiers were held to determine the African national teams for under 23 which participated at the 2008 Summer Olympics football tournament held in Beijing.

Preliminary competition was divided in three rounds. The first two rounds were knockout rounds, and the final round was a group stage.

== First round ==
First legs played from 1 to 3 September 2006. Second legs played from 6 to 8 October 2006.

Team 1	Agg.	Team 2	1st leg	2nd leg
Gambia	0–4	Egypt	0–0	0–4
Sierra Leone	2–4	Rwanda	2–1	0–3
Guinea-Bissau	0–2	Guinea	0–2	0–0
Mozambique	5–3	Libya	1–0	4–3
South Africa	2–1	Namibia	1–0	1–1
Sudan	2–5	Equatorial Guinea	2–0	0–5
Malawi	2–0^{1}	Somalia	2–0	
Zambia	10–0^{2}	Djibouti	10–0	
Chad	w/o	Uganda	—	—
Zimbabwe	w/o	Tanzania	—	—
Mauritius	w/o	Burkina Faso	—	—
Senegal	w/o	Comoros	—	—
Ivory Coast	w/o	Lesotho	—	—
Mauritania	w/o	Botswana	—	—
Ethiopia	w/o	Liberia	—	—
Benin	w/o	DR Congo	—	—
Central African Republic	w/o	Algeria	—	—

^1 Only one leg because of security concerns in Somalia.
^2 Only one leg because of security concerns in Djibouti.

1 September 2006

Gambia	0–0	Egypt

Bakau
8 October 2006
21:00 (UTC+2)

Egypt	4–0	Gambia
Said 33'; Magdy 39'; Osama 56', 78'

Alexandria Stadium, Alexandria
Attendance: 7,000
Referee: Mohamed Lamine Benaïssa (Algeria)

1 September 2006

Sierra Leone	2–1	Rwanda

Freetown
7 October 2006

Rwanda	3–0	Sierra Leone
Yirirwahandi 19'; Hategikimana 38'; Nyumbayire 65'

Kigali

2 September 2006

Guinea-Bissau	0–2	Guinea

Bissau
8 October 2006

Guinea	0–0	Guinea-Bissau

Conakry

3 September 2006

Mozambique	1–0	Libya
(pen.)

Maputo
6 October 2006

Libya	3–4	Mozambique

GMR Stadium, Tripoli
Referee: Slimane Brahimi (Morocco)

3 September 2006

South Africa	1–0	Namibia
Modubi 30'

Olën Park, Potchefstroom
8 October 2006

Namibia	1–1	South Africa
Tshilo 51' (o.g.)		Chabangu 54'

Sam Nujoma Stadium, Katutura

4 September 2006

Sudan	2–0	Equatorial Guinea

Omdurman
7 October 2006

Equatorial Guinea	5–0	Sudan

Malabo

30 September 2006

Malawi	0–2^{1}	Somalia

Blantyre

7 October 2006

Zambia	10–0^{2}	Djibouti

Lusaka

== Second round ==
First legs played on 7 and 8 February 2007. Second legs played from 23 to 25 March 2007.

Team 1	Agg.	Team 2	1st leg	2nd leg
Algeria	2–4	Ethiopia	1–3	1–1
Angola	0–2	Guinea	0–0	0–2
Burkina Faso	0–5^{3}	Ghana	0–3	0–2
Egypt	2–4	Ivory Coast	1–1	1–3
Mali	4–2	Mozambique	1–0	3–2
Morocco	4–0	Rwanda	3–0	1–0
Nigeria	7–0	Equatorial Guinea	5–0	2–0
Senegal	w/o^{4}	DR Congo	—	—
South Africa	2–0	Uganda	2–0	0–0
Tunisia	0–1	Botswana	0–0	0–1
Zambia	4–3	Malawi	3–2	1–1
Zimbabwe	2–4	Cameroon	1–1	1–3

^3 Burkina Faso penalized by FIFA for allegedly using two overage players during first leg match against Ghana. The original score was Burkina Faso won by 2–0.
^4 DR Congo failed to appear, and blamed poor flight connections. FIFA handed walkover to Senegal.

7 February 2007
14:30 (UTC+1)

Algeria	1–3	Ethiopia
Benmoussa 85' (pen.)		Tafese 33'; Said 39'; Worku 90+3'

20 August Stadium, Algiers
Referee: Ahmed Auda (Egypt)
25 March 2007

Ethiopia	1–1	Algeria

Addis Ababa Stadium, Addis Ababa

7 February 2007

Angola	0–0	Guinea

Luanda
25 March 2007

Guinea	2–0	Angola
Feindouno 33'; 78'

Stade du 28 Septembre, Conakry

7 February 2007

Burkina Faso	2–0 (original score) 0–3 (awarded score)^{3}	Ghana

Ouguadougou
25 March 2007

Ghana	2–0	Burkina Faso

Coronation Park, Sunyani

7 February 2007

Egypt	1–1	Ivory Coast
El Mohamady 90'		Cissé 22'

Cairo International Stadium, Cairo
Referee: Mohamed Guezzaz (Morocco)
24 March 2007

Ivory Coast	3–1	Egypt
Goal		Said

Abidjan

7 February 2007
16:30 (UTC+0)

Mali	1–0	Mozambique
Traoré 52'

Stade Modibo Kéïta, Bamako
Referee: Raphaël Evehe Divine (Cameroon)
25 March 2007

Mozambique	2–3	Mali

Maputo

7 February 2007

Morocco	3–0	Rwanda
Rabeh 26'; Benjelloun 55'; Iajour 57'

Stade El Abdi, El Jadida
Attendance: 3,500
Referee: Mourad Daâmi (Tunisia)
24 March 2007
15:30 (UTC+2)

Rwanda	0–1	Morocco
		Rabeh 38'

Amahoro Stadium, Kigali
Attendance: 5,000
Referee: ... (Tanzania)

7 February 2007

Nigeria	5–0	Equatorial Guinea
Bazuaye 30'; Obinna 39' (pen.); Promise 45'; Okoronkwo 58', 87'

National Stadium, Abuja
23 March 2007

Equatorial Guinea	0–2	Nigeria

Malabo

7 February 2007

Senegal	Cancelled^{4}	DR Congo

7 February 2007

South Africa	2–0	Uganda
Davids 67'; Chabangu 73'

Olën Park, Potchefstroom
24 March 2007

Uganda	0–0	South Africa

Kampala

7 February 2007
17:30 (UTC+1)

Tunisia	0–0	Botswana

Stade El Menzah, Tunis
Referee: Khalid Abdel Rahman (Sudan)
22 March 2007
14:30 (UTC+2)

Botswana	1–0	Tunisia
Jomo

Botswana National Stadium, Gaborone

7 February 2007

Zambia	3–2	Malawi
Gondwe 47'; Singuluma 67'; Sunzu 80'		Msowoya 47'; Gonani 64'

Independence Stadium, Lusaka
24 March 2007

Malawi	1–1	Zambia
Msowoya 36'		Mulenga 28'

Kamuzu Stadium, Blantyre

7 February 2007

Zimbabwe	1–1	Cameroon
75'		30'

Rufaro Stadium, Harare
25 March 2007

Cameroon	3–1	Zimbabwe
Bekamenga 5'; Lombé 35'; Tchetgna 56'		Gomba 30'

Ahmadou Ahidjo Stadium, Yaoundé
Attendance: 200
Referee: Mario Bougoura (Guinea)

== Final round ==
Matches played from 1 June 2007 to 26 March 2008. The winner of each group represented Africa at the 2008 Olympic Games.

=== Group A ===
Ethiopia withdrew from the Olympic qualification after the first match due to millennium festivities in their country.

Pos	Team	Pld	W	D	L	GF	GA	GD	Pts	Qualification
1	Nigeria	4	2	2	0	7	3	+4	8	2008 Summer Olympics
2	Ghana	4	2	1	1	8	5	+3	7	
3	South Africa	4	0	1	3	3	10	−7	1	
4	Ethiopia	0	0	0	0	0	0	0	0	Withdrew

3 June 2007

Ethiopia	2–2 Annulled	South Africa
Said 9'; Tafese 68' (pen.)		Mdledle; Mokoena 66' (pen.)

Addis Ababa Stadium, Addis Ababa
3 June 2007

Nigeria	3–2	Ghana
Obinna 2', 35' (pen.); Okoronkwo 51'		Tagoe 4'; Gyan 15'

National Stadium, Abuja

22 August 2007

South Africa	1–1	Nigeria
Chabangu 45'		Obinna 11' (pen.)

Olympia Park, Rustenburg
Referee: Ahmed Auda (Egypt)

8 September 2007

South Africa	1–3	Ghana
Davids 88'		Tagoe 26', 33'; Ahsah 85'

Olën Park, Potchefstroom

14 October 2007

Ghana	3–1	South Africa
Gyan 13', 85'; Kumordzi 35'		Rodgers 55'

Accra Sports Stadium, Accra

16 November 2007

Ghana	0–0	Nigeria

Accra Sports Stadium, Accra

26 March 2008

Nigeria	3–0	South Africa
Taiwo 25'; Promise 74'; Anichebe 90'

National Stadium, Abuja

=== Group B ===
Pos	Team	Pld	W	D	L	GF	GA	GD	Pts	Qualification
1	Ivory Coast	6	5	0	1	13	6	+7	15	2008 Summer Olympics
2	Zambia	6	3	1	2	11	9	+2	10	
3	Senegal	6	1	2	3	4	7	−3	5	
4	Mali	6	1	1	4	5	11	−6	4	

1 June 2007

Senegal	0–0	Mali

Dakar
3 June 2007

Zambia	2–0	Ivory Coast
Mbewe 29'; Singuluma 31'

Nchanga Stadium, Chingola
Referee: Thapelo Disang (Botswana)

22 August 2007

Mali	1–2	Zambia
Diarra 24'		Chibambo 40'; Kasonde 85'

Bamako
22 August 2007

Ivory Coast	2–0	Senegal
Angoua 71'; Gervinho 75'

Abidjan

8 September 2007

Zambia	1–1	Senegal
Sunzu 69'		M'Bow 44'

Lusaka
9 September 2007

Ivory Coast	3–1	Mali
Guié 22'; N'Gossan; Gervinho 81' (pen.)		Dembélé 36'

Abidjan

13 October 2007

Mali	1–2	Ivory Coast
Sidibé 36'		Djakpa 55'; Gervinho 90'

Bamako
13 October 2007

Senegal	2–1	Zambia
Ndiaye 23'; Diompy 33'		Sunzu 30'

Dakar

17 November 2007

Mali	1–0	Senegal
Diarra

Bamako
18 November 2007

Ivory Coast	4–1	Zambia
Gervinho 32', 38'; Cissé 59'; Kalou 80'		Singuluma 70'

Abidjan

26 March 2008

Zambia	4–1	Mali
Mayuka 4'; Tembo 28'; Mudenda 33'; Mwansa 78'		Fawbaolou 77'

Lusaka
26 March 2008

Senegal	1–2	Ivory Coast
Sarr 65'		Cissé 36', 50'

Dakar

=== Group C ===
Pos	Team	Pld	W	D	L	GF	GA	GD	Pts	Qualification
1	Cameroon	6	4	2	0	14	5	+9	14	2008 Summer Olympics
2	Morocco	6	3	1	2	7	7	0	10	
3	Botswana	6	2	1	3	4	5	−1	7	
4	Guinea	6	1	0	5	6	14	−8	3	

2 June 2007

Morocco	1–0	Botswana
El Bahri 39'

Moulay Abdellah Stadium, Rabat
Referee: Jamal Ambaya (Libya)
3 June 2007

Cameroon	6–1	Guinea
Mboua 4', 32', 80'; Mbengono 18'; N'Gal 45', 55'		Coreah 27'

Roumdé Adjia Stadium, Garoua
Attendance: 20,000
Referee: Mohamed Lamine Benaïssa (Algeria)

22 August 2007

Botswana	0–0	Cameroon

Botswana National Stadium, Gaborone
22 August 2007

Guinea	1–2	Morocco
Bangoura 65'		Benjelloun 86'; Sbai 90+3'

Stade du 28 Septembre, Conakry

7 September 2007

Guinea	2–0 (Abandoned at 80')	Botswana
Goal

Stade du 28 Septembre, Conakry

Match abandoned at 80, when six Botswanan players were sent off forcing the referee to call off the game.

9 September 2007

Cameroon	2–1	Morocco
Ndoum 25'; Mboua 33'		Chihi 17'

Roumdé Adjia Stadium, Garoua
Attendance: 20,000
Referee: Khalid Abdel Rahman (Sudan)

13 October 2007

Botswana	2–1	Guinea
Selefa 68', 90'		Sylla 52'

Botswana National Stadium, Gaborone
14 October 2007

Morocco	2–2	Cameroon
Hermach 63'; Benzouien 90+2'		Ollé Ollé 31'; Bekamenga 47'

Moulay Abdellah Stadium, Rabat
Attendance: 45,000
Referee: Badara Diatta (Senegal)

17 November 2007

Botswana	2–0	Morocco
Ramoshibidu; Sembowa

Botswana National Stadium, Gaborone
18 November 2007

Guinea	1–3	Cameroon
Sylla 24'		Chedjou 13'; Enam 38'; Bekamenga 85'

Stade du 28 Septembre, Conakry

26 March 2008

Cameroon	1–0	Botswana
N'Gal 13'

Ahmadou Ahidjo Stadium, Yaoundé
Referee: Muhmed Ssegonga (Uganda)
26 March 2008

Morocco	1–0	Guinea
El Bassel 65'

Stade El Bachir, Mohammedia
