= 2005 African Youth Championship =

CAN Junior Coupe d'Afrique des nations juniors 2005

Tournament details
- Host country: Benin
- Dates: 15–29 January
- Teams: 8 (from 1 confederation)

Final positions
- Champions: Nigeria (5th title)
- Runners-up: Egypt
- Third place: Benin
- Fourth place: Morocco

Tournament statistics
- Top scorer: (Morocco) Mouhssine Iajour

The 2005 African Youth Championship was an international football competition that took place between 15 and 29 January 2005. The tournament was hosted by Benin and also served as qualification for the 2005 FIFA World Youth Championship.

== Qualification ==
=== Preliminary round ===
Burundi and Mauritius withdrew. As a result, the Republic of Congo and Lesotho advanced to the next round.

Team 1	Agg.	Team 2	1st leg	2nd leg
Libya	2–2(a)	Niger	2–2	0–0
Sierra Leone	(a)1–1	Gambia	0–0	1–1
Sudan	3–1	Somalia	1–0	2–1
Eritrea	0–1	Rwanda	0–1	0–0
Namibia	0–5	Botswana	0–0	0–5

=== First round ===
Republic of Congo, Congo Kinshasa, Ethiopia, Gabon and Tanzania withdrew. As a result, Cameroon, Nigeria, Zambia, Ghana and Zimbabwe advanced to the next round.

Team 1	Agg.	Team 2	1st leg	2nd leg
Algeria	1–3	Niger	1–2	0–1
Morocco	3–1	Sierra Leone	3–0	0–1
Egypt	4–0	Sudan	4–0	0–0
South Africa	2–2(a)	Lesotho	2–1	0–1
Mozambique	1–4	Rwanda	1–0	0–4
Angola	5–2	Botswana	3–0	2–2
Ivory Coast	2–2 (p: 5–4)	Guinea	2–0	0–2
Tunisia	1–1 (p: 3–5)	Burkina Faso	1–0	0–1
Mali	3–1	Senegal	3–1	0–0

=== Second round ===
Niger were disqualified by the FIFA. Accusations were made to each other from Lesotho and Zimbabwe of using over-aged players, but no actions were taken.

Team 1	Agg.	Team 2	1st leg	2nd leg
Morocco	DSQ	Niger	4–0	not played
Zambia	2–3	Egypt	2–0	0–3
Zimbabwe	0–3	Lesotho	0–0	0–3
Angola	1–0	Rwanda	1–0	0–0
Ghana	1–2	Ivory Coast	0–1	1–1
Nigeria	5–2	Burkina Faso	2–0	3–2
Mali	(a)2–2	Cameroon	1–0	1–2

== Squads ==
The following teams qualified for the tournament:

- Angola
- Benin (host)
- Ivory Coast
- Egypt
- Lesotho
- Mali
- Morocco
- Nigeria

== Group stage ==
=== Group A ===
Pos	Team	Pld	W	D	L	GF	GA	GD	Pts	Qualification
1	Nigeria	3	3	0	0	7	1	+6	9	Advance to knockout stage
2	Benin (H)	3	1	1	1	7	7	0	4	Advance to knockout stage
3	Ivory Coast	3	1	0	2	2	5	−3	3	
4	Mali	3	0	1	2	4	7	−3	1	

Rules for classification: Group tiebreakers
(H) Hosts
15 January 2005

Ivory Coast	1-0	Mali
Abdramane Diaby 61'

15 January 2005

Benin	0-3	Nigeria
		Taye Taiwo 25' (pen.); David Adwo 34'; Victor Obinna 46'

18 January 2005

Nigeria	3-1	Mali
Kalifa Dembele 55'		David Abwo 45'; Solomon Okoronkwo 81'; Olubayo Adefemi 84'

18 January 2005

Ivory Coast	1-4	Benin
Yedi Zahiri 90'		Coffi Agbessi 37'; Gariga Maiga 49'; 80' (pen.); Mathieu Adeniyi 52'

22 January 2005

Nigeria	1-0	Ivory Coast
Taye Taiwo 78'

22 January 2005

Benin	3-3	Mali
Romuald Boco 31'; Bachirou Osseni 40'; Razak Omotoyossi 44'		Kalifa Dembele 27'; Boubacar Kebe 35'; Koniba Ladji 65'

=== Group B ===
Pos	Team	Pld	W	D	L	GF	GA	GD	Pts	Qualification
1	Egypt	3	2	1	0	7	3	+4	7	Advance to knockout stage
2	Morocco	3	2	1	0	5	2	+3	7	Advance to knockout stage
3	Lesotho	3	1	0	2	3	7	−4	3	
4	Angola	3	0	0	3	1	4	−3	0	

Rules for classification: Group tiebreakers
16 January 2005

Egypt	1-0	Angola
Islam Adel 20' (pen.)

16 January 2005

Morocco	2-0	Lesotho
Rachid Tiberkanine 63'; Tarik Bendamou 80'

19 January 2005

Angola	1-2	Lesotho
Manuel Zando 27'		Dlomo Monaphathi 40'; Bokang Mothoana 45'

19 January 2005

Morocco	2-2	Egypt
Mouhssine Iajour 49'; Tarik Bendamou 76'		Mahmoud Alla 46'; Islam Siam 84'

23 January 2005

Angola	0-1	Morocco
		Mouhssine Iajour 39'

23 January 2005

Egypt	4-1	Lesotho
Abdou Abdallah 7'; Farag Ahmed 12'; Mohamed Abdallah 75'; Mahmoud Alla 82'		Lintho Korie 88' (pen.)

== Knock-out Stage ==
Semi-finals
26 January -
Nigeria	2(5)
Morocco	2(3)
26 January -
Egypt	1(3)
Benin	1(1)

Final
29 January -
Nigeria	2
Egypt	0
Third place
29 January -
Morocco	1(3)
Benin	1(5)

=== Semifinals ===
26 January 2005

Nigeria	2-2	Morocco
Solomon Okoronkwo 53'; Victor Obinna 114'		Mouhssine Iajour 11' 101'
Penalties
	5-3

26 January 2005

Egypt	1-1	Benin
Islam Adel 83'		Abou Maiga 3'
Penalties
	3-1

=== Third place match ===
January 29, 2005

Morocco	1-1	Benin
Mouhssine Iajour 11'		Abdoulaye Ouzerou 45'
Penalties
	3-5

=== Final ===
January 29, 2005

Nigeria	2-0	Egypt
Isaac Promise 45' 55'

2005 African Youth Championship

Nigeria
Fifth title

== Qualification to World Youth Championship ==
The four best performing teams qualified for the 2005 FIFA World Youth Championship.

- Benin
- Egypt
- Morocco
- Nigeria

== Goalscorers ==
Nationality	Player name	Goals scored
(Morocco)	Mouhssine Iajour	5
(Nigeria)	David Adwo	2
(Egypt)	Farag Ahmed	2
(Mali)	Kalifa Dembele	2
(Egypt)	Islam Adel	2
(Nigeria)	Solomon Okoronkwo	2
(Morocco)	Tarik Bendamou	2
(Nigeria)	Victor Obinna	2
(Nigeria)	Taye Taiwo	2
(Benin)	Abou Maiga	2
(Egypt)	Abdou Abdallah	1
(Benin)	Abdoulaye Ouzerou	1
(Ivory Coast)	Abdramane Diaby	1
(Mali)	Bachirou Osseni	1
(Lesotho)	Bokang Mothoana	1
(Mali)	Boubacar Kebe	1
(Benin)	Coffi Agbessi	1
(Lesotho)	Dlomo Monaphathi	1
(Egypt)	Hossam Nasr	1
(Nigeria)	Isaac Promise	1
(Egypt)	Islam Siam	1
(Mali)	Koniba Ladji	1
(Lesotho)	Lintho Korie	1
(Angola)	Manuel Zando	1
(Benin)	Mathieu Adeniyi	1
(Egypt)	Mohamed Abdallah	1
(Nigeria)	Olubayo Adefemi	1
(Morocco)	Rachid Tiberkanine	1
(Benin)	Razak Omotoyossi	1
(Benin)	Romuald Boco	1
(Ivory Coast)	Zahiri Yedi	1

== Murder of Samiou Yessoufou ==
After Benin lost 3–0 to Nigeria on the opening day, Benin fans became outraged with goalkeeper Samiou Yessofou believing he was blamed for their loss. So they broke into a hotel bar just as Yessofou was beginning to drink alcohol for the first time. They grabbed glass bottles and smashed them on him and stabbed with a knife and tortured him with beating sticks. Then they left the bar causing Yessofou to fall the floor and he died. However, this did not stop the tournament which continued as normal and Benin went on to win a bronze medal later on.
