= 2019 Austin Bold FC season =

Austin Bold FC
2019 season
- Stadium: Bold Stadium; Austin, Texas
- USL: Conference: 8th
- USL Cup Playoffs: Conference Quarterfinals
- 2019 U.S. Open Cup: 4th Round
- Copa Tejas: Champion
- Highest home attendance: League/All: 5,803 (March 30 vs. San Antonio)
- Lowest home attendance: League/All: 1,201 (September 11 vs. Sacramento)
- Average home league attendance: 2,395
- Biggest win: 5–0 (June 29 vs. Colorado Springs)
- Biggest defeat: 0–6 (July 19 at Phoenix)

The 2019 Austin Bold FC season was the inaugural season for Austin Bold FC in the USL Championship, the second-tier professional soccer league in the United States and Canada.

== Club ==
As of April 19, 2019

No.	Position	Player	Nation
1	GK	COL	Juan David Ramírez (on loan from Atlético Nacional)
2	DF	CHI	Jorge Troncoso
3	DF	NED	Edson Braafheid
4	DF	JAM	Jermaine Taylor
6	MF	SCO	Calum Mallace
7	MF	USA	Julian Gaines
8	MF	MEX	Xavier Báez
9	FW	BRA	Kléber
11	FW	NGR	Isaac Promise
12	DF	JAM	Demar Phillips
14	MF	KSA	Faris Abdi
15	DF	USA	Amobi Okugo
17	DF	JAM	Sean McFarlane
18	DF	FRA	Fabien Garcia
19	FW	USA	Kris Tyrpak
20	DF	USA	Josué Soto (on loan from Querétaro)
21	MF	FRA	Thomas de Villardi
22	FW	USA	Clayton Adams
23	GK	JAM	Ryan Thompson
24	GK	USA	Diego Restrepo
27	MF	RUS	Valeri Saramutin
28	DF	USA	London Woodberry
33	MF	USA	Sonny Guadarrama
99	FW	BRA	André Lima

== Competitions ==
=== Preseason ===
February 13	Austin Bold FC	1–1	Saint Louis FC	Texas
	8'	Report	Greig 15'	Attendance: Closed-door
Note: Match played with three periods of 30 minutes each

February 16	Austin Bold FC	2–0	UTRGV Vaqueros	Texas
		Report		Attendance: Closed-door

February 17	Austin Bold FC	2–0	Round Rock SC	Texas
		Report		Attendance: Closed-door

February 23	Rio Grande Valley FC Toros	3–1	Austin Bold FC	Edinburg, Texas
7:00 PM CST	Small 3'; Trialist 51'; Garza 109' (pen.)	Report	19'; (yellow card) 49'	Stadium: H-E-B Park
Note: Match played with two periods of 45 minutes and one period of 35 minutes

February 27	Austin Bold FC	2–1	North Texas SC	Round Rock, Texas
CST	Woodberry 71'; Promise 75'	ATX Report; NTSC Report	Pepi 15'; Radilla (yellow card) 80'	Stadium: Round Rock Multipurpose Complex

=== USL Championship ===
==== Standings ====
Pos	Team	Pld	W	D	L	GF	GA	GD	Pts	Qualification
6	El Paso Locomotive FC	34	13	11	10	42	36	+6	50	Conference Quarterfinals
7	Sacramento Republic	34	14	6	14	50	43	+7	48	Play-In Round
8	Austin Bold FC	34	13	9	12	53	52	+1	48	Play-In Round
9	LA Galaxy II	34	12	12	10	59	62	−3	48	Play-In Round
10	New Mexico United	34	11	13	10	59	57	+2	46	Play-In Round

Source: USL Championship Standings
Rules for classification: 1) total wins; 2) total goal differential; 3) total goals scored; 4) points earned against top four Conference finishers; 5) disciplinary points; 6) coin toss or drawing of lots

==== Match results ====
The 2019 USL Championship season schedule for the club was announced on December 19, 2018.

Win Draw Loss Upcoming fixtureJuly 3

Unless otherwise noted, all times in CDT

March 9 1	Las Vegas Lights FC	0–0	Austin Bold FC	Las Vegas, Nevada
9:30 pm PDT	Parra (yellow card) 45+1'; Thomas (yellow card) 87'	Report	Guadarrama (yellow card) 25'; Lima (yellow card) 90+2'	Stadium: Cashman Field; Attendance: 8,017; Referee: Timothy Ford

March 16 2	Reno 1868 FC	2–1	Austin Bold FC	Reno, Nevada
4:00 PM	Brown 46', 78'	Report	Kléber 14', (yellow card) 35'; Taylor (yellow card) 45+4'; Saramutin (yellow card) 47'	Stadium: Greater Nevada Field; Attendance: 2,919; Referee: Farhad Dadkho

March 30 3	Austin Bold FC	1–0	San Antonio FC	Austin, Texas
7:30 PM	McFarlane (yellow card) 59'; Kléber 77'	Report	Maguraushe (yellow card) 25'; Hernandez (yellow card) 54'	Stadium: Bold Stadium; Attendance: 5,803; Referee: Yusri Rudolf

April 6 4	Sacramento Republic FC	1–0	Austin Bold FC	Sacramento, California
9:30 PM	Keinan (yellow card) 44'; Saari (yellow card) 64'; Taylor 85' (o.g.)	Report	Kléber (yellow card) 12'; Troncoso (yellow card) 30'	Stadium: Papa Murphy's Park; Attendance: 11,569; Referee: Calin Radosav

April 17 5	Austin Bold FC	1–0	Phoenix Rising FC	Austin, Texas
7:30 PM	Mallace (yellow card) 40'; Guadarrama 52'	Report	Pérez (yellow card) 11'; Flemmings (yellow card) 65'; Spencer (yellow card) 71'; Asante (yellow card) 74'	Stadium: Bold Stadium; Attendance: 1,615; Referee: Jon Freemon

April 21 6	Austin Bold FC	0–0	El Paso Locomotive FC	Austin, Texas
4:00 PM	Okugo (yellow card) 62'	Report	N'Toko (yellow card) 44'; Kiffe (yellow card) 79'	Stadium: Bold Stadium; Attendance: 1.839; Referee: Michael Radchuk

April 26 7	Austin Bold FC	3–2	Real Monarchs	Austin, Texas
7:30 PM	McFarlane 4'; Lima 11', 42', (yellow card) 45+5'; Promise (yellow card) 16'; Saramutin (red card) 45'	Report	Blake (yellow card) 3'; Schmitt 19'; Moberg (yellow card) 45+6'; Martínez 54'	Stadium: Bold Stadium; Attendance: 2,003; Referee: Elijio Arreguin

May 4 8	LA Galaxy II	1–0	Austin Bold FC	Carson, California
9:00 PM	Harvey (yellow card) 30'; DePuy (yellow card) 38'; Taylor 56' (o.g.); Vom Steeg (yellow card) 90+2'	Report	Guadarrama (yellow card) 36'; Báez (yellow card) 65'; McFarlane (yellow card) 82'	Stadium: Dignity Health Sports Park; Attendance: 589; Referee: Joseph Salinas

May 10 9	Austin Bold FC	2–1	OKC Energy FC	Austin, Texas
7:30 PM	Guadarrama (yellow card) 11'; Saramutin (yellow card) 56', (goal) 61'; Kléber (yellow card) 76', (goal) 80' (pen.)	Report	Brown 28'; Williams (yellow card) 30'	Stadium: Bold Stadium; Attendance: 1,804; Referee: Elton Garcia

May 18 10	Orange County SC	2–2	Austin Bold FC	Irvine, California
7:00 PM	Leonardo (yellow card) 37'; Jones 43'; Quinn 52'; Seaton (yellow card) 90+3'	Report	Lima (yellow card) 38', (goal) 43'; Troncoso 39'	Stadium: Championship Soccer Stadium; Attendance: 4,240; Referee: Kevin Stott

May 22 11	Fresno FC	1–0	Austin Bold FC	Fresno, California
9:30 PM	Chaney (yellow card) 25'; Cochran (yellow card) 55'; Lawal 84', (yellow card) 85'	Report	Lima (yellow card) 54'; McFarlane (yellow card) 54'	Stadium: Chukchansi Park; Attendance: 3,115; Referee: Malik Badawi

May 25 12	Austin Bold FC	1–3	New Mexico United	Austin, Texas
7:30 PM	Promise 55'; Garcia (red card) 72'; Okugo (yellow card) 84'	Report	Okugo 29' (o.g.); Tetteh (yellow card) 35'; Moar (yellow card) 40', (goal) 62', 88'; Williams (yellow card) 90+3'	Stadium: Bold Stadium; Attendance: 2,907; Referee: Matthew Franz

June 1 13	Tulsa Roughnecks FC	2–3	Austin Bold FC	Tulsa, Oklahoma
7:00 P.M.	Hedrick (yellow card) 5'; Altamirano 17'; Silva 48'	Report	Guadarrama (yellow card) 60'; Tyrpak 61', 69', 90+2'; Okugo (yellow card) 66'	Stadium: ONEOK Field; Attendance: 2,187; Referee: Luis Guardia

June 8 14	Austin Bold FC	2–2	Portland Timbers 2	Austin, Texas
7:30 PM	Lima 19', (yellow card) 68'; Báez (yellow card) 19'; Tyrpak 33'; Saramutin (yellow card) 43'	Report	Ornstil (yellow card) 8'; Williamson 43'; Langsdorf (yellow card) 51'; Wharton 81'; Jadama (yellow card) 90+1'; Anguiano (yellow card) 90+4'	Stadium: Bold Stadium; Attendance: 2,815; Referee: Mark Allatin

June 15 15	Austin Bold FC	1–1	Tacoma Defiance	Austin, Texas
7:30 PM	Kléber 61'; Báez (yellow card) 90'	Report	Dhillon 37'; Daley (yellow card) 82'; Gonzalez (red card) 88'	Stadium: Bold Stadium; Attendance: 2,755; Referee: Matthew Thompson

June 22 16	Rio Grande Valley FC Toros	0–1	Austin Bold FC	Edinburg, Texas
7:30 PM	Castellanos (yellow card) 22'; Adams (yellow card) 83'	Report	Saramutin (yellow card) 32'; McFarlane (yellow card) 41'; Lima 50'; Kléber (yellow card) 55'; Tyrpak (yellow card) 88'; Okugo (yellow card) 90+4'; Restrepo (yellow card) 90+6'	Stadium: H-E-B Park; Attendance: 3,286; Referee: Gustavo Solorio

June 29 17	Austin Bold FC	5–0	Colorado Springs Switchbacks FC	Austin, Texas
7:30 PM	Lima 13', 20'; Kléber (yellow card) 21'; Atuahene 28'; Báez 50'; Burt 56' (o.g.)	Report	Rwatubyaye (yellow card) 54'; Robinson (yellow card) 75'	Stadium: Bold Stadium; Attendance: 2,413; Referee: Adam Kilpatrick

July 3 18	San Antonio FC	3–0	Austin Bold FC	San Antonio, Texas
7:30 PM	Okugo 8' (o.g.); Bryant (yellow card) 41'; Forbes 50'; Gallegos (yellow card) 64'; Ackon (yellow card) 67'; Parano 70'; Greene (yellow card) 90+2'	Report	Báez (yellow card) 45'; Guadarrama (yellow card) 76'	Stadium: Toyota Field; Attendance: 7,514; Referee: Daniel Gutierrez

July 13 19	Austin Bold FC	3–2	Orange County SC	Austin, Texas
7:30 PM	Lima 10'; McFarlane 21', (yellow card) 22'; Soto (yellow card) 55'; Báez (yellow card) 73'; Tyrpak 90+2'	Report	Alvarado 27'; Seaton 67'; Forrester (yellow card) 76'; Cervantes (yellow card) 89'	Stadium: Bold Stadium; Attendance: 2,023; Referee: Malik Badawi

July 19 20	Phoenix Rising FC	6–0	Austin Bold FC	Scottsdale, Arizona
7:30 PM	Asante 17', 58'; Musa 54'; Jahn 66'; Bakero 76'; Farrell (yellow card) 80'; Calistri 84'	Report	Okugo (yellow card) 28'; Saramutin (yellow card) 41'; Woodberry (yellow card) 51'; Braafheid (red card) 73'	Stadium: Phoenix Rising FC Soccer Complex; Attendance: 7,387; Referee: Dejan Susak

July 27 21	Austin Bold FC	1–0	Fresno FC	Austin, Texas
7:30 PM	Promise 43'; Soto (yellow card) 48'	Report	Basuljevic (yellow card) 37'; Chaney (yellow card) 85'	Stadium: Austin Bold Stadium; Attendance: 2,430; Referee: Greg Dopka

August 3 22	New Mexico United	2–2	Austin Bold FC	Albuquerque, New Mexico
8:30 PM	Bruce 5'; Williams (yellow card) 38'; Frater 48'	Report	Okugo (yellow card) 11', (goal) 31', 67'; McFarlane (yellow card) 70'; Promise (yellow card) 72'; Faris (yellow card) 85'; Phillips (yellow card) 90+3'	Stadium: Isotopes Park; Attendance: 14,327; Referee: Michael Radchuk

August 10 23	Austin Bold FC	1–3	LA Galaxy II	Austin, Texas
7:30 PM	Tyrpak 25'; Phillips (yellow card) 45+1' (yellow-red card) 76'; Taylor (red card) 81'	Report	Acheampong (yellow card) 11'; Hilliard-Arce (yellow card) 34'; Harvey 46'; Williams 59' (pen.); Ontiveros (yellow card) 70'; Koreniuk 90+6'	Stadium: Austin Bold Stadium; Attendance: 2,518; Referee: Rosendo Mendoza

August 17 24	Austin Bold FC	5–1	Tulsa Roughnecks FC	Austin, Texas
8:00 PM	Twumasi 2'; Lima 10'; Kléber 25' (pen.), (yellow card) 30', (goal) 41' (pen.); Guadarrama 83' (pen.)	Report	Ajeakwa (yellow card) 9'; Hedrick (yellow card) 24'; Altamirano 43' (pen.); Stajduhar (yellow card) 83'; Reyes (yellow card) 90+1'	Stadium: Austin Bold Stadium; Attendance: 1,971; Referee: Farhad Dadkho

August 24 25	OKC Energy FC	4–2	Austin Bold FC	Oklahoma City, Oklahoma
8:00 PM	Ross (yellow card) 11'; Watson (yellow card) 19'; Lima 24' (o.g.); R. García 27'; Eissele 31'; D. Brown 42'	Report	Guadarrama (yellow card) 22'; Okugo (yellow card) 26'; Tyrpak 77'; Faris 88'	Stadium: Taft Stadium; Attendance: 4,016; Referee: Gustavo Solorio

September 1 26	Austin Bold FC	3–0	Rio Grande Valley FC Toros	Austin, Texas
7:30 PM	Twumasi 33'; Taylor (yellow card) 55'; Lima 60'; Promise (yellow card) 72', (goal) 87'	Report	Corti (red card) 44'; Enríquez (yellow card) 57'; Fuenmayor (yellow card) 77'; Coronado (yellow card) 85'	Stadium: Austin Bold Stadium; Attendance: 1,968; Referee: Kevin Broadley

September 7 27	Colorado Springs Switchbacks FC	1–1	Austin Bold FC	Colorado Springs, Colorado
7:00 PM	Romero 41'	Report	Rissi (yellow card) 26', (goal) 70'; Restrepo (yellow card) 45+2'; Tyrpak (yellow card) 59'; Twumasi (yellow card) 65'; Phillips (yellow card) 90'	Stadium: Weidner Field; Attendance: 4,850; Referee: Calin Radosav

September 11 28	Austin Bold FC	1–2	Sacramento Republic FC	Austin, Texas
7:30 PM	Guadarrama (yellow card) 21'; Kléber 33'; Okugo (yellow card) 65'	Report	Enevoldsen 23', (yellow card) 90+6'; Skundrich (yellow card) 26'; Formella 31'; Shuttleworth (yellow card) 75'; Bijev (yellow card) 87'	Stadium: Austin Bold Stadium; Attendance: 1,201; Referee: Jon Freemon

September 15 29	Austin Bold FC	1–2	Reno 1868 FC	Austin, Texas
6:00 PM	de Villardi (yellow card) 38'; Kléber 41'; Phillips (yellow card) 79'	Report	Hertzog 20' (pen.); Musovski 43'; Galindo (yellow card) 52'; Mfeka (yellow card) 89'	Stadium: Austin Bold Stadium; Attendance: 1,645; Referee: Guido Gonzales, Jr.

September 22 30	Austin Bold FC	4–1	Las Vegas Lights FC	Austin, Texas
6:00 PM	Kléber 21', 31', 90+1'; Lima 51'; Báez (yellow card) 61'	Report	Sousa 23', (yellow card) 28'; Sandoval (yellow card) 45+1'	Stadium: Austin Bold Stadium; Attendance: 3,004; Referee: Luis Guardia

September 29 31	Portland Timbers 2	1–2	Austin Bold FC	Portland, Oregon
3:00 PM	Hanson 25'; Diz (yellow card) 27'; Smith (yellow card) 65'	Report	Tyrpak 64'; Lima (yellow card) 82', (goal) 84'; Báez (yellow card) 90+2'	Stadium: Providence Park; Attendance: 1,357; Referee: Eric Tattersall

October 5 32	Real Monarchs	P–P	Austin Bold FC	Herriman, Utah
2:00 PM				Stadium: Zions Bank Stadium
Note: Match rescheduled due to the death of Isaac Promise.

October 10 33	El Paso Locomotive FC	1–1	Austin Bold FC	El Paso, Texas
8:00 PM	Monsalvez (yellow card) 42'; Velásquez 76' (pen.)	Report	Mallace (yellow card) 35'; Okugo (yellow card) 45+3'; Kléber (yellow card) 53'; Lima (yellow card) 77', (goal) 81'; Taylor (yellow card) 82'; Soto (yellow card) 90+3'	Stadium: Southwest University Park; Referee: Pierre-Luc Lauziere

October 16 32	Real Monarchs	2–2	Austin Bold FC	Herriman, Utah
8:00 PM	Vazquez 5'; Coffee 55'; Ryden (yellow card) 90+3'	Report	Twumasi 18'; McFarlane (yellow card) 23'; Rissi (yellow card) 44'; Soto (yellow card) 52'; Lima 57'; Kléber (red card) 86'	Stadium: Zions Bank Stadium; Attendance: 1,503; Referee: Greg Dopka
Note: Match rescheduled from October 5.

October 19 34	Tacoma Defiance	3–1	Austin Bold FC	Tacoma, Washington
9:00 PM	Gonzalez 21'; Vargas 77'; Daley 79'; Hegardt (yellow card) 88'; Rogers (yellow card) 89'	Report	de Villardi (yellow card) 61'; Tyrpak 82'	Stadium: Cheney Stadium; Attendance: 5,185; Referee: Malik Badawi

==== USL Cup Playoffs ====
October 23 Play-In Round	Austin Bold FC	2–0	LA Galaxy II	Austin, Texas
7:30 PM	Twumasi 9', (yellow card) 76'; Lima (yellow card) 32'; Soto (yellow card) 49'; McFarlane 54'; Braafheid (yellow card) 60'	Report	Harvey (yellow card) 35'; Hernández (yellow card) 76'; Kamara (yellow card) 77'	Stadium: Austin Bold Stadium; Attendance: 2,656; Referee: Guido Gonzales Jr

October 26 Conference Quarterfinals	Phoenix Rising FC	0–0 (a.e.t.) (8–7 p)	Austin Bold FC	Scottsdale, Arizona
7:30 PM	Lambert (yellow card) 70'; Jahn (yellow card) 86'	Report	Soto (yellow card) 14'; McFarlane (yellow card) 35'; Guadarrama (yellow card) 68' de Villardi (yellow card) 95'	Stadium: Phoenix Rising FC Soccer Complex; Attendance: 6,642; Referee: Elvis Osmanovic
	Penalties
	Flemmings (penalty scored); Bakero (penalty scored); Calistri (penalty scored); Lambert (penalty missed); Spencer (penalty scored); Farrell (penalty scored); Johnson (penalty scored); Dia (penalty scored); Cochran (penalty scored)		(penalty scored) Tyrpak; (penalty missed) de Villardi; (penalty scored) McFarlane; (penalty scored) Soto; (penalty scored) Braafheid; (penalty scored) Okugo; (penalty scored) Atuahene; (penalty scored) Twumasi; (penalty missed) Taylor

=== U.S. Open Cup ===
As a member of the USL Championship, Austin Bold FC will enter the tournament in the Second Round, to be played May 14–15, 2019

May 14 Second round	Austin Bold FC (Texas)	2–0	(Oklahoma) Tulsa Roughnecks	Austin, Texas
7:30 PM	Báez (yellow card) 29'; Guadarrama 34'; Lima 74'	Report	Blackwell (yellow card) 33'; Makinde (yellow card) 69'	Stadium: Austin Bold Stadium; Attendance: 1,266; Referee: Luis Guardia

May 29 Third round	Austin Bold FC (Texas)	4–2	(Texas) San Antonio FC	Austin, Texas
7:30 p.m. CDT	Kléber 10', (yellow card) 84'; Guadarrama 39'; Lima 43', 62'; Taylor (yellow card) 57'; Saramutin (yellow card) 71'	Report	Castillo (yellow card) 37'; Laing (yellow card) 41'; Restrepo 44'; Gallegos (yellow card) 60'; Barmby (yellow card) 90+3', (goal) 90+4'	Stadium: Bold Stadium; Attendance: 2,555; Referee: Marco Vega

June 11 Fourth round	Houston Dynamo (Texas)	3–2	(Texas) Austin Bold FC	Houston, Texas
7:00 PM CDT	Martínez 14'; Peña 31'; Vera 40'; Cabezas (yellow card) 65'; Duvall (yellow card) 70'; O. García (yellow card) 88'	Report	Guadarrama (yellow card) 42'; Báez 48', (yellow card) 51'; Saramutin (yellow card) 49'; Promise 58'; Taylor (yellow card) 86'	Stadium: BBVA Compass Stadium; Attendance: 4,765; Referee: Elton Garcia
