= Ollo =

Ollo may refer to:

== People ==
- Desiré Ollo (born 1965), Gabonese boxer
- Gustavo Ollo (born 1963), Argentinian boxer
- Imanol Erviti Ollo (born 1983), Spanish road bicycle racer
- Karl Ollo, Russian figure skater
- Manuel de Irujo y Ollo (1891–1981), Spanish politician
- Ollo Kambou (born 1986), Ivory Coast football player
- Patrice Ollo N'Doumba (born 1986), Cameroonian football player, who has last playing for KuPS

== Places ==
- Ollo, Navarre, Spain

== Other ==
- Ollo, character in the Ollo in the Sunny Valley Fair game
