= Sofian Benzouien =

Moroccan footballer

Personal information
- Full name: Sofian Benzouien
- Date of birth: 11 August 1986 (age 40)
- Place of birth: Sint-Agatha-Berchem, Belgium
- Height: 1.78 m (5 ft 10 in)
- Position: Right winger

Youth career
- Anderlecht

Senior career*
Years	Team	Apps	(Gls)
2004–2006	Heusden-Zolder	43	(3)
2006–2007	Brussels	5	(0)
2007	Racing Santander B		
2007–2009	Perugia	4	(0)
2009–2010	Eupen	27	(1)
2010–2019	F91 Dudelange	114	(39)
2019–2020	Swift Hesperange	0	(0)

International career
2008	Morocco	1	(0)

Managerial career
- 2019–2022: Swift Hesperange (sporting director)
- * Club domestic league appearances and goals

Sofian Benzouien (born 11 August 1986) is a retired footballer. Born in Belgium, he has represented Morocco at international level.

== Biography ==
A Morocco youth international at the 2005 FIFA World Youth Championship, Benzouien had played in youth and reserve teams of Anderlecht, Beringen-Heusden-Zolder and Brussels. In January 2007, he left for Spanish side Racing de Santander B (reserve team of Racing de Santander)

In August 2007, he joined Perugia of Serie C1. After just played 4 matches in 2007–08 season, and nil in 2008–09 season, he canceled his contract with club in mutual consent.

In January 2009, he joined Eupen at Belgian Second Division. In July 2010, he signed for F91 Dudelange in the Luxembourg National Division. He played for Dudelange until the end of the 2018–19 season.

=== International career ===
A U20 internationals of Morocco, Benzouien was call-up to Morocco U23 for a friendly match, to prepare for 2008 CAF Men's Pre-Olympic Tournament.

== Later career ==
In the summer of 2019, Benzouien moved to Luxembourger second-division club Swift Hesperange, where he took over as sporting director and was also available to the team for one more season as a stand-by player. The club parted ways with Benzouien in September 2022.
