= Noumonvi =

Noumonvi is a surname. Notable people with the surname include:

- Dieu Donné Noumonvi (born 2001), Beninese footballer
- Mélonin Noumonvi (born 1982), French wrestler
