= Agbessi =

Agbessi is a surname. Notable people with the surname include:

- Coffi Agbessi (born 1985), Beninese footballer
- Sonya Agbéssi, Beninese long jumper
