= Judicaël Agbéci =

Beninese professional footballer

Personal information
- Date of birth: 20 January 2002 (age 24)
- Place of birth: Parakou, Benin
- Position: Midfielder

Team information
- Current team: Bechem United
- Number: 27

Senior career*
Years	Team	Apps	(Gls)
2017–2020	Salitas	0	(0)
2020–	Bechem United	7	(0)

International career
2018–	Benin U20		
2020–	Benin U23		
- * Club domestic league appearances and goals as of 20 June 2021

Judicaël Agbéci (born 20 January 2002) is a Beninese professional footballer who plays as midfielder for Ghanaian Premier League side Bechem United F.C.

== Club career ==
=== Early career ===
Agbéci started his career in his native country playing for Association Sportive Trésor Académie (ASTA). In 2017, he joined Burkinabe side Salitas FC, later extending his contract until 2021.

=== Bechem United ===
Agbéci joined Ghanaian club Bechem United in October 2020, as the league was set to restart after it was cancelled due to restrictions from the COVID-19 pandemic in Ghana. He made his debut during the 2020–21 season on 17 January 2021, after playing the full 90 minutes in a 1–1 draw against Cape Coast Ebusua Dwarfs. During the 4–0 thrashing of rivals Aduana Stars on 18 April 2021, he came on in the 74th minute for Francis Twene to play the remainder of the match.

== International career ==
Between 2018 and 2021, Agbéci was a member of the Benin national under-20 football team. In October 2020, he was part of their squad that featured during the 2020 WAFU Zone B U-20 tournament. In January 2020, he also received a call up into the Benin U-23 team ahead of the UFOA B tournament alongside teammate Dieu Donné Noumonvi.
