= Bachirou =

Bachirou is both a given name and a surname. Notable people with the name include:

- Bachirou Osséni (1985–2019), Beninese footballer
- Bachirou Salou (born 1970), Togolese footballer
- Fouad Bachirou (born 1990), French footballer
