= Coffi Agbessi =

Beninese footballer (born 1985)

Personal information
- Full name: Coffi Franck Edem Agbessi
- Date of birth: 5 December 1985 (age 40)
- Place of birth: Cotonou, Benin
- Height: 1.65 m (5 ft 5 in)
- Position: Midfielder

Senior career*
Years	Team	Apps	(Gls)
2004	Soleil Cotonou		
2004–2005	Olympic Zawiya		
2005–2006	Mohun Bagan		
2007–2011	Soleil Cotonou		

International career
2005	Benin U20	6	(2)
2005	Benin	4	(1)
- * Club domestic league appearances and goals

Coffi Edem Agbessi (born 5 December 1985) is a retired Beninese professional footballer who predominantly played as a midfielder and represented Benin national team on four occasions.

== Club career ==
=== Earlier career ===
Agbessi began his senior club career with Beninese outfit Soleil Cotonou in 2004 and later moved to Libyan Premier League side Olympic Azzaweya SC, where he played until 2005. With Olympic Azzaweya, he has also appeared in the 2005 CAF Champions League but not qualified for the knockout stages.

=== Mohun Bagan ===
In 2005, Agbessi signed with National Football League powerhouse Mohun Bagan AC. Club president Swapan Sadhan Bose said, Stephen Abarowei has been instrumental in bringing Agbessi ahead of their NFL season. He showed his class in the 2nd leg of the Kolkata Derby against East Bengal FC in 2006. In that 2005–06 National Football League, Mohun Bagan ended the season with third place Finnish as Agbessi appeared in all games.

With Mohun Bagan from 2005 to 2006, Agbessi won the Calcutta Football League in 2005 and the Federation Cup in 2006.

=== Back to Soleil Cotonou ===
In 2007, he returned to his previous club Soleil Cotonou and appeared in numerous games of Benin Premier League until his retirement due to injury in 2011.

== International career ==
=== Benin U20 ===
Agbessi has represented Benin U20 national team at the 2005 African Youth Championship, where they achieved third place. He also scored a goal against Ivory Coast in the tournament. He has also represented Benin U20 team at the 2005 FIFA World Youth Championship under the coaching of Serge Devèze and appeared in all three group matches. Benin finished third in the Group A and bowed out of the tournament.

=== Senior team ===
He made his senior international debut for Benin on 27 March 2005 against Ivory Coast in a 2006 FIFA World Cup Qualifiers, which ended as a 3–0 loss for Benin.

He scored his first ever goal for "Les Écureuils" on 4 June against Cameroon in the Group-3 final qualification match of World Cup. He has appeared in 4 matches for his country.

== Career statistics ==
=== International goals ===
Scores and results list Benin's goal tally first.

No.	Date	Venue	Opponent	Score	Result	Competition	Ref.
1.	4 June 2005	Stade de l'Amitié, Cotonou, Benin	Cameroon	1–4	1–4	2006 FIFA World Cup qualification	

== Honours ==
Benin U20

- African Youth Championship third place: 2005

Mohun Bagan AC

- Calcutta Football League: 2005
- Federation Cup: 2006
