= Mohammed Amine El Bourkadi =

Moroccan footballer (born 1985)

Amine Bourkadi
Personal information
- Full name: Mohammed Amine El Bourkadi
- Date of birth: 22 February 1985 (age 41)
- Place of birth: Fez, Morocco
- Height: 1.85 m (6 ft 1 in)
- Position: Goalkeeper

Team information
- Current team: Tháder
- Number: 1

Senior career*
Years	Team	Apps	(Gls)
–2007	Maghreb de Fès		
2007–2010	Raja Casablanca		
2009–2010	→ Wydad de Fès (loan)		
2010–2014	Wydad de Fès	50	(0)
2014–2016	Olympique Khouribga	46	(0)
2016–2019	FAR Rabat	57	(0)
2019–2021	Maghreb de Fès	13	(0)
2021–	Tháder		

International career
2005	Morocco U20	7	(0)
2005–2008	Morocco U23	1	(0)
- * Club domestic league appearances and goals as of 13 April 2021

Mohammed Amine El Bourkadi (Arabic: محمد أمين بورقادي; born 22 February 1985) is a Moroccan professional footballer who plays as a goalkeeper for Spanish Regional Preferente club Tháder.

== Club career ==
In 2019, El Bourkadi returned to his first club, Maghreb de Fès, after a 12-year absence where he played for various other clubs in Morocco.

On 29 October 2021, he joined Spanish Regional Preferente club Tháder.

== International career ==
He has represented Morocco at under-23 level. He played for his country at the 2005 FIFA World Youth Championship, in which Morocco placed fourth.

== Honours ==
Raja Casablanca

- Botola Pro: 2008–09

Olympique Khouribga

- Moroccan Throne Cup: 2014–15

Morocco U20

- FIFA U-20 World Cup fourth place: 2005
