= Miquel Robusté =

Spanish footballer (born 1985)

Personal information
- Full name: Miquel Robusté Colomer
- Date of birth: 20 May 1985 (age 41)
- Place of birth: Vilassar de Mar, Spain
- Height: 1.85 m (6 ft 1 in)
- Position: Centre-back

Youth career
- Espanyol

Senior career*
Years	Team	Apps	(Gls)
2004–2006	Espanyol B	24	(1)
2006–2007	Espanyol	0	(0)
2006–2007	→ Poli Ejido (loan)	29	(0)
2007–2011	Levante	44	(3)
2011–2012	Xerez	35	(1)
2012–2014	Ponferradina	21	(0)
2014–2015	Cartagena	28	(0)
2015–2016	Rapid București	24	(2)
2016–2022	Badalona	149	(4)
2022–2023	Vilassar Mar	20	(1)
Total		374	(12)

International career
2001–2003	Spain U17	16	(1)
2004	Spain U19	8	(1)
2005	Spain U20	4	(2)
- * Club domestic league appearances and goals

Miquel Robusté Colomer (born 20 May 1985) is a Spanish former professional footballer who played as a central defender.

== Club career ==
Born in Vilassar de Mar, Barcelona, Catalonia, Robusté a started his career at the second biggest club in Barcelona, RCD Espanyol. He played for both Juvenil teams during 2003–04 and was a regular of the reserves in his three-season spell, with 21 Segunda División B appearances in his second year, suffering relegation.

Robusté was loaned to Polideportivo Ejido of Segunda División for the 2006–07 campaign, and played 30 official games for the Andalusia side. In the summer of 2007 he was released by Espanyol with only one competitive appearance to his credit – one minute in the 2–0 away win against Cádiz CF in the quarter-finals of the Copa del Rey– and joined Levante UD of La Liga.

Due to the club's severe financial crisis, Robusté was propelled into the first team, making his top-flight debut on 30 March 2008 in a 2–1 away defeat to UD Almería. On 22 May 2010, with the team again in division two, he scored twice in a 5–3 victory over FC Cartagena, as the Valencians eventually finished third and promoted.

On 10 August 2011, after only seven league matches with Levante, Robusté left and returned to the second tier, signing for Xerez CD late in the month. He continued competing at that level the following seasons, with SD Ponferradina.

Robusté retired in September 2023 aged 38, following spells in the Catalan lower and amateur leagues, mostly with CF Badalona.

== International career ==
Robusté was captain of the Spain under-19 team that won the 2004 UEFA European Championship. He also represented the nation at the 2005 FIFA World Youth Championship.

== Career statistics ==
As of match played 28 March 2021

Club	Season	League			Cup		Continental		Total	
Club	Season	Division	Apps	Goals	Apps	Goals	Apps	Goals	Apps	Goals
Espanyol B	2003–04	Segunda División B	3	0	—		—		3	0
Espanyol B	2004–05	Segunda División B	21	1	—		—		21	1
Espanyol B	Total		24	1	—		—		24	1
Espanyol	2005–06	La Liga	0	0	1	0	—		1	0
Poli Ejido (loan)	2006–07	Segunda División	29	0	1	0	—		30	0
Levante	2007–08	La Liga	4	0	0	0	—		4	0
Levante	2008–09	Segunda División	16	1	1	0	—		17	1
Levante	2009–10	Segunda División	17	2	0	0	—		17	2
Levante	2010–11	La Liga	7	0	3	1	—		10	1
Levante	Total		44	3	4	1	—		48	4
Xerez	2010–11	Segunda División	35	1	1	0	—		36	1
Ponferradina	2012–13	Segunda División	8	0	4	0	—		12	0
Ponferradina	2013–14	Segunda División	13	0	1	1	—		14	1
Ponferradina	Total		21	0	5	1	—		25	1
Cartagena	2014–15	Segunda División B	26	0	0	0	2 (Note: Appearances in Segunda División B relegation play-offs)	0	28	0
Rapid București	2015–16	Liga II	24	2	0	0	—		24	2
Badalona	2016–17	Segunda División B	24	1	0	0	—		24	1
Badalona	2017–18	Segunda División B	19	2	0	0	—		19	2
Badalona	2018–19	Segunda División B	35	0	1	0	—		36	0
Badalona	2019–20	Segunda División B	23	0	3	1	—		26	1
Badalona	2020–21	Segunda División B	18	0	0	0	—		18	0
Badalona	Total		119	3	4	1	—		123	4
Career total			322	10	16	3	2	0	340	13

== Honours ==
Espanyol

- Copa del Rey: 2005–06

Spain U19

- UEFA European Under-19 Championship: 2004
