= Gustavo Oberman =

Argentine footballer

Personal information
- Full name: Gustavo Andrés Oberman
- Date of birth: 25 March 1985 (age 41)
- Place of birth: Quilmes, Argentina
- Height: 1.75 m (5 ft 9 in)
- Position: Midfielder

Youth career
- Argentinos Juniors

Senior career*
Years	Team	Apps	(Gls)
2004–2005	Argentinos Juniors	32	(4)
2005–2006	River Plate	7	(1)
2006–2007	Argentinos Juniors	11	(0)
2007–2008	Castellón	36	(4)
2007	→ CFR Cluj (loan)	5	(0)
2008–2009	Córdoba	14	(0)
2009–2012	Argentinos Juniors	97	(5)
2013	Quilmes	18	(1)
2013–2014	Olimpo	8	(0)
2015	San Marcos	13	(2)
2016	Pune City	5	(0)
2017–2018	Argentino de Quilmes	21	(3)
2018–2021	Dock Sud	75	(8)

International career
2005	Argentina U20	7	(1)
- * Club domestic league appearances and goals as of 08:32, 20 August 2022 (UTC)

Gustavo Andrés Oberman (born 25 March 1985 in Quilmes, Buenos Aires) is an Argentine football player.

== Career ==
Nicknamed Cachete, Oberman began his career at Argentinos Juniors in 2003, after the 2005 Clausura tournament he was transferred to River Plate, but he only spent one season there before returning to Argentinos Juniors in summer 2006. In June 2008 he was transferred from CD Castellón to the CFR Cluj of Romania for $500.000 .

Since joining CFR Cluj Oberman has been loaned out to Córdoba CF of Spain in 2009 and then back to his first club Argentinos Juniors between 2009 and 2010 where he was an important member of the team that won the Clausura 2010 championship. He played in 16 of the club's 19 games during the championship winning campaign.

== International ==
He has also played with the Argentina Under-20 team, winning the 2005 FIFA World Youth Championship.

== Family ==
His father is Enrique Pablo Oberman, a retired football player.

== Titles ==
Argentina U-20

- FIFA U-20 World Cup (1): 2005

Argentinos Juniors

- Argentine Primera División (1): Clausura 2010
