= Abdelilah Galal =

Egyptian footballer (born 1986)

Personal information
- Full name: Abdelilah Galal Abdelhamid
- Date of birth: 20 January 1986 (age 40)
- Place of birth: Cairo, Egypt
- Height: 1.82 m (5 ft 11 1/2 in)
- Position: Defender

Team information
- Current team: Arab Contractors

Youth career
- 2001–2004: El-Ahly

Senior career*
Years	Team	Apps	(Gls)
2004–2007	El-Ahly	?	(?)
2007–2008	Al Ittihad Alexandria Club		
2008–	Arab Contractors		
- * Club domestic league appearances and goals as of 28 November 2006 ‡ National team caps and goals as of 28 November 2006

Abdelilah Galal (Arabic: عبدالإله جلال) (born 20 January 1986) is an Egyptian footballer.

== Career ==
Galal currently plays at the club level for the Arab Contractors.

He also played for the Egypt national football team at the 2005 FIFA World Youth Championship in the Netherlands.
