= Yedi Zahiri =

French-born Ivorian footballer

Personal information
- Date of birth: 2 September 1985 (age 41)
- Place of birth: Paris, France
- Height: 1.73 m (5 ft 8 in)
- Position: Winger

Senior career*
Years	Team	Apps	(Gls)
2003–2004	Nîmes	2	(0)
2004–2005	Rouen	10	(0)
2005–2006	Lyon Duchère	4	(0)
2007–2008	WS Woluwé	27	(6)
2008–2009	OH Leuven	20	(1)
2011–2012	FC Pepingen	?	(?)
2012	Union SG	0	(0)
2012–2013	Gloria Bistrița	10	(1)
2013–2014	Lancy		
2015–2016	Lancy		
2016–2017	Terre Sainte		

International career
2005	Ivory Coast U20		
- * Club domestic league appearances and goals as of 11 January 2013

Yedi Zahiri (born 2 September 1985) is a French retired footballer, who last played as a midfielder for Terre Sainte.

== Career ==
=== Early career ===
Born in Paris, Zahiri received his football education in France, going through the youth ranks of Nîmes, Rouen and Lyon Duchère. A talented youngster, he was selected to play for the Ivory Coast national under-20 football team during the 2005 African Youth Championship, where he also scored a goal against the home nation Benin.

=== Belgium ===
To improve his chances of breaking through, he opted to move out of France in 2007, signing with White Star Woluwé in the Belgian Third Division, before being noticed and signed in 2008 by OH Leuven in the Belgian Second Division. At OH Leuven, he never got to show his full potential due to injuries and was told to look for a new club near the end of the 2008–09 season.

Apart from a short spell at White Star Woluwé, Zahiri did not play football between 2009 and 2011 due to some severe injuries. In 2011, he started playing again with FC Pepingen, an amateur team at the fifth level of Belgian football. At Pepingen he stood out often and as a result he was noticed by scouts from third division team Union Saint-Gilloise, signing a contract in 2012.

=== Gloria Bistrița ===
In the summer of 2012, he left Saint-Gilloise to sign a contract with Gloria Bistrița where he was given the 16 number shirt.
