= Dieu Donné Noumonvi =

Beninese footballer (born 2001)

Personal information
- Date of birth: 28 December 2001 (age 24)
- Place of birth: Parakou, Benin
- Position: Midfielder

Team information
- Current team: Bechem United
- Number: 23

Senior career*
Years	Team	Apps	(Gls)
2017–2019	Salitas	0	(0)
2019–	Bechem United	4	(0)

International career
2017–2018	Benin U17		
2018–	Benin U20		
2020–	Benin U23		
- * Club domestic league appearances and goals as of 20 June 2021

Dieu Donné Noumonvi (born 28 December 2001) is a Beninese professional footballer who plays as midfielder for Ghanaian Premier League side Bechem United F.C. At the international level, he has featured for the Benin U17, U20 and U23 national teams.

== Club career ==
=== Early career ===
Noumonvii started his career in his native land Benin playing for Association Sportive Trésor Académie (ASTA). In November 2016, he joined Burkinabe side Salitas FC on a two-year contract set to expire in 2019. In December 2019. Upon the expiration of his contract, he signed a new two-year deal with the Ouagadougou-based side extending his stay with the club until 2021. He however joined Ghanaian side Bechem United in same month and didn't feature for Salitas.

=== Bechem United ===
Noumonvi joined Ghanaian club Bechem United in December 2019, He made his debut during the 2019–20 season on 20 January 2020, after coming on in the 57th minute for Prince Kwabena Adu in a 1–0 victory over Eleven Wonders FC. He went on and made 3 league appearances before the league was halted due to the outbreak of the COVID-19 in Ghana.

== International career ==
In 2017, Noumonvi played for the Benin national under-17 football team. In 2018, he was promoted to the Benin national under-20 football team and given a call up alongside teammate Judicael Agbeci. In October 2020, he was part of their squad that featured during the 2020 WAFU Zone B U-20 tournament. In January 2020, he was also called up into the Benin U-23 team as part of the preparations for the 2020 UFOA B tournament.
