= Marc Mboua =

Cameroonian footballer (born 1987)

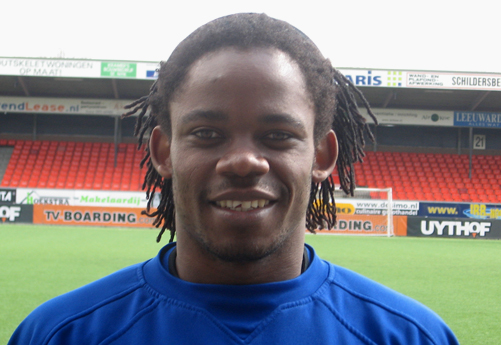
- Mboua in 2008

Personal information
- Date of birth: 26 February 1987 (age 39)
- Place of birth: Yaoundé, Cameroon
- Height: 1.65 m (5 ft 5 in)
- Position: Striker

Youth career
- 1999–2001: Elpida de Yaoundé
- 2001–2002: Racing FC Bafoussam

Senior career*
Years	Team	Apps	(Gls)
2002–2004	Real Bamako	26	(13)
2004–2006	Zamalek	21	(5)
2006–2007	SC Feignies	15	(4)
2007–2009	SC Cambuur	38	(12)
2009–2010	Fortuna Sittard	13	(1)
2010–2011	Al-Ittihad	22	(3)
2011–2012	Smouha	14	(3)
2012–2013	Beni Sweif	14	(2)
2013–2014	Al-Hilal SC (Benghazi)		
2014	El Entag El Harby	14	(2)
2014–2015	Toulouse Rodéo FC	18	(6)
2015–2016	Aurillac	11	(0)
2016–2018	Muret	35	(14)

International career
2008	Cameroon Olympic	2	(0)
- * Club domestic league appearances and goals

Marc Mboua (born 26 February 1987) is a Cameroonian former professional footballer who played as a striker.

== Career ==
Mboua, like so many other children, started to learn football on the streets of his home city, Cameroonian capital Yaoundé. In 1999, along with another 300 boys Mboua took part in trials at local club Elpida de Yaoundé. He stayed there, as part of their academy, for two years, before moving to Racing FC Bafoussam, where he spent only one season.

In 2002 Mboua signed for Mali-based AS Real Bamako and began his senior career. In the 2003–04 season Mboua scored 13 times in 26 games, earning him a close-season move to Zamalek in 2004.

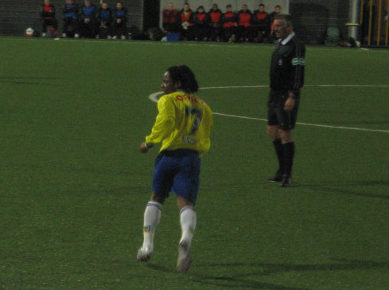
Mboua at Cambuur

In 2006, he followed the path of many African footballers to France, where he joined SC Feignies in the CFA2 division. Here he stayed for only one season before moving to the Netherlands, to join Eerste Divisie side SC Cambuur.

His form for Cambuur, where he scored 11 times in 31 games, earned him a place in the Cameroon squad for the 2008 Olympics in Beijing, where he made two appearances.

== Personal life ==
During his time in Egypt, Mboua met a French woman, Sophie, whom he married. They now have a daughter together, Mélissa. On 18 April 2007, a DJ by the name of "DJ Sergio" released a track entitled "Buldo" – Mboua's nickname, a song that is a tribute to Mboua, his family and concerns the obstacles in his career.
