= Thomas de Villardi =

French footballer (born 1994)

Personal information
- Full name: Thomas de Villardi de Montlaur
- Date of birth: 27 March 1994 (age 32)
- Place of birth: Vincennes, France
- Height: 1.85 m (6 ft 1 in)
- Positions: Defender; midfielder

Youth career
- 2000–2008: Club Olympique Vincennois
- 2008–2012: Guingamp

College career
Years	Team	Apps	(Gls)
2013–2014	Duquesne Dukes	27	(2)
2015–2016	Delaware Fightin' Blue Hens	39	(4)

Senior career*
Years	Team	Apps	(Gls)
2014	Seattle Sounders FC U-23	1	(0)
2016	New York Red Bulls U-23	8	(1)
2017	Minnesota United	0	(0)
2019–2020	Austin Bold	22	(0)
2021	Charlotte Independence	10	(0)
- * Club domestic league appearances and goals as of 16:03, 5 November 2021 (UTC) ‡ National team caps and goals as of 16:33, 15 January 2017 (UTC)

Thomas de Villardi de Montlaur (born 27 March 1994) is a retired French footballer.

== Career ==
=== Youth ===
De Villardi played for Club Olympique Vincennois between the ages of 6 and 14. He then competed with the Val-de-Marne district team in the Paris interdistrict tournament and was spotted by Ligue 1 club Guingamp. After a three or four day trial, he was signed by the club and stayed for four years before leaving in 2013 to play college soccer in the United States. He made one appearance for the club's reserve side in the CFA 2 during the 2012/13 season.

=== College ===
De Villardi played two seasons of college soccer with the Dukes of Duquesne University. Over that time, he made a total of 27 appearances for the team, scoring two goals. During his freshman year, he appeared in every match and was named to the Atlantic 10 All-Rookie Team. For his junior and senior seasons, he transferred to the University of Delaware. For the 2015 season he earned NSCAA All-Midwest Region Third Team and All-CAA First Team honors while tallying nine assists. His nine assists led the conference and was 21st nationally. It also tied a single-season school record in that category. For the 2015 season he made 19 appearances tallying two goals and nine assists. In 2016, he made 20 appearances while scoring two goals and tallying four assists.

=== Semi-professional ===
In 2014, de Villardi signed for the Seattle Sounders FC U-23 team of the Premier Development League. He made one appearance for the club during the season.

De Villardi was signed by New York Red Bulls U-23, also of the PDL, for the 2016 season. Over the season, he made eight appearances, scoring one goal. He was also part of the club's squad for their opening round defeat to the New York Pancyprian-Freedoms during the 2016 Lamar Hunt U.S. Open Cup. However, he did not appear in the match.

=== Professional ===
De Villardi was selected 42nd overall by Minnesota United FC in the 2017 MLS SuperDraft. About drafting de Villardi, Minnesota head coach Adrian Heath said, "...we've taken somebody that we were worried was going to get taken before because it's someone Amos has seen and likes a lot so it's we're really pleased with what we've done today.”

On 29 November 2018, de Villardi signed for USL Championship side Austin Bold FC ahead of their inaugural season.

In March 2021, de Villardi joined Charlotte Independence for the 2021 season.
