= Islam Adel =

Egyptian footballer (born 1988)

Personal information
- Full name: Islam Adel Ibrahim Mahmoud
- Date of birth: July 1, 1988 (age 38)
- Place of birth: Mansoura, Egypt
- Height: 1.74 m (5 ft 9 in)
- Position: Defensive midfielder

Youth career
- Al Ahly

Senior career*
Years	Team	Apps	(Gls)
2009–2010	El-Entag El-Harby		
2010–2014	Misr Lel-Makkasa		
2014	Telephonat Beni Suef	14	(0)
2014–2016	Wadi Degla	27	(0)
2016–2017	Misr Lel-Makkasa	3	(0)
2017–2018	El Raja SC	0	(0)
2018–2019	Al-Jandal		
- * Club domestic league appearances and goals as of 22 August 2017

Islam Adel Ibrahim Mahmoud (Arabic: إِسْلَام عَادِل إِبْرَاهِيم مَحْمُود; born July 1, 1988) is an Egyptian professional footballer who plays as a defensive midfielder . In 2016, Adel signed a 3-year contract for Misr Lel-Makkasa in a free transfer as his contract with Wadi Degla expired. He participated in 3 matches with Makkasa in 2016–17 Egyptian Premier League in which they finished 2nd. He previously played for El-Entag El-Harby, Telephonat Beni Suef and Wadi Degla. In July 2017, he signed a 2-year contract for El Raja SC in a free transfer.

He moved to Saudi club Al-Jandal in 2018.
