= Bandari F.C. =

Bandari F.C. may refer to one of two African football clubs:

- Bandari F.C. (Kenya), a team in the Kenyan Premier League
- Bandari F.C. (Tanzania), a team in the Tanzanian Premier League
