= Georges Ndoum =

Cameroonian footballer

Georges N'Doum
Personal information
- Date of birth: 31 July 1985 (age 41)
- Place of birth: Cameroon
- Height: 1.83 m (6 ft 0 in)
- Position: Left back

Senior career*
Years	Team	Apps	(Gls)
–2004	Borussia Mönchengladbach II		
2004–2005	U.S. Vibonese Calcio	4	(0)
2005–2006	KFC Uerdingen 05	9	(0)
2006–2008	MSV Duisburg II	32	(1)
2007–2008	MSV Duisburg	2	(0)
2008	AC Horsens	0	(0)
Total		47	(1)
- * Club domestic league appearances and goals

Georges N'Doum (born 31 July 1985) is a Cameroonian former professional footballer who played as a defender for TuS 64 Bösinghoven. His preferred position is left back.
