= Ollo Kambou =

Ivorian footballer

Ollo Kambou (born 1986 in Bingerville, Côte d'Ivoire) is a footballer who started his career when he joined Stade d'Abidjan, a team in the Division 1 Championship in Cote d'Ivoire, in 2004. He played left back for Stade until 2005, when his contract ended.

He was then taken on by another Division 1 team, Séwé Sport de San Pedro, when they asked him to sign at the beginning of 2006. He continued playing left back for San Pedro until his contract ended the following year, 2007.

By the end of 2007 Stade d'Abidjan invited him back as left back. He continued with Stade from early 2008 to the beginning of 2009, when he received an invitation to play for Yadanarbon FC, a team representing Mandalay, Myanmar. He went to Myanmar in April 2009 to play in the first official season of the Myanmar National League.

Though he was originally on the roster to play in the 2008 Ivorian Olympic team, he did not end up participating.

He played left back with Yadanarbon FC, wearing jersey number 3 from 2009 to 2011.

At the end of 2011, Kambou was asked to sign with Manaw Myay FC, a team representing the Kachin State in Northern Myanmar. He remained with this team, wearing jersey number 5, as left wing and midfielder until November 2015.

== Accomplishments ==
- Champion of the Asian Federation Cup (AFC) Stage Group, 2010
- Three time Champion of the Myanmar National League, 2009, 2009, 2010
- Eliminated in the 2nd Round of the CAF Champions League, 2007
- Participated in the UEMOA (Union Économique et Monétaire Ouest-African (Economic and Monetary Union of West Africa)) Cup in Mali on Ivory Coast's National Hope Team U23, 2007
- Eliminated in the 2nd Round of the CAF Cup, 2006
- Vice Champion of the Ivory Coast, 2006
- Winner of the Coupe Houphouët-Boigny, 2005
- Ivory Coast Junior National Team in Benin (CAN – Coupe d'Afrique Nation Juniors (African National Cup Junior)), 2005 (See 2005 African Youth Championship squads)
- Finalist in the Felix Houphouet Boigny Cup, 2004

== See also ==
- 2005 African Youth Championship squads
- fr:Coupe de la confederation 2006
- fr:Championnat de Côte d'Ivoire de football 2006
- fr:Super Coupe Félix Houphouët-Boigny
