= Safradine Traoré =

Beninese footballer

Personal information
- Date of birth: 31 May 1986 (age 40)
- Place of birth: Porto-Novo, Benin
- Height: 1.68 m (5 ft 6 in)
- Position: Striker

Team information
- Current team: Buffles FC
- Number: 17

Youth career
- 2000–2003: Buffles FC

Senior career*
Years	Team	Apps	(Gls)
2004–	Buffles FC		

International career^{‡}
2005	Benin	3	(0)
- * Club domestic league appearances and goals ‡ National team caps and goals as of 17 May 2008

Safradine Traoré (born 31 May 1986) is a Beninese international football player who currently plays for Buffles FC.

== Career ==
Traoré began his career with Buffles FC and was promoted to the first team in 2005.

== International ==
He played his first three caps for Benin in 2005 and was member of the CAN Coupe du Monde 2006.
