= Rida Lah Douliazale =

Moroccan international footballer

Reda Doulyazal
Personal information
- Full name: Rida Lah Douliazale
- Date of birth: September 3, 1985 (age 41)
- Place of birth: Casablanca, Morocco
- Height: 1.70 m (5 ft 7 in)
- Position: Midfielder

Youth career
- 1998–2004: Wydad Casablanca

Senior career*
| Years | Team | Apps | (Gls) |
| 2004–2009 | Wydad Casablanca | 73 | (23) |
| 2006–2007 | → Kawkab Marrakech (loan) | 15 | (1) |

International career
| 2004–2005 | Morocco U-20 | 9 | (1) |
| 2007–2008 | Morocco U-23 | 3 | (0) |
| 2009 | Morocco | 0 | (0) |
- * Club domestic league appearances and goals

Rida Lah Douliazale (born 3 September 1985) is a former Moroccan international footballer who played as a central midfielder.

== Club career ==
=== Wydad Casablanca ===
When he was signed at Wydad his comments showed how important this was to him, " I always dreamed to have a place in the starting 11 of Wydad. Playing in a big club like Wydad is a honour for me". He played a game in the Botola 2006–07 with Wydad Casablanca that ended in a draw. In the Arab Champions League 2008-09 he scored two goals against Al-Taliya and Al Oruba Sur. In 73 appearances for Wydad, Rida Lah scored 23 goals, 0.3 goals per game. He is no longer with the club.

=== Kawkab Marrakech ===
Douliazale wore the number 5 during the Botola 2006-07 season on loan at Kawkab Marrakech.

In 15 appearances for Kawkab, Rida Lah scored 1 goal, 0.06 goals per game.

=== Seattle Sounders FC ===
He was on trial with the Seattle Sounders FC of the Major League Soccer. If Douliazale had joined the Sounders, he would have been the second player from Wydad Casablanca to join Major League Soccer since Khalil Azmi joined the Colorado Rapids in 1996.

== Statistics ==
| Season | Club | Competition | Apps. | Goals |
|---|---|---|---|---|
| 2004/05 | Wydad Casablanca | GNF 1 | 37 | 15 |
| 2006/07 | Wydad Casablanca | GNF 1 | 1 | 0 |
| 2006/07 | Kawkab Marrakech | GNF 1 | 15 | 1 |
| 2007/08 | Wydad Casablanca | GNF 1 | 20 | 13 |
| 2008/09 | Wydad Casablanca | GNF 1 | 0 | 0 |
| Total | Last updated | 8–07–2009 | 83 | 29 |

== International career ==
Douliazale played for the Moroccan U-20 football team from 2004 to 2005 scoring 1 goal in 9 games.

He was selected for the 2005 FIFA World Youth Championship in the Netherlands and scored the goal against Spain in a 3–1 loss. He also gave an assist to Nabil El Zhar against Italy, the game ended as a 2–2 draw. In penalties, Douliazale missed the second penalty for Morocco. In 2006, he then played for the Moroccan U-23 football team he has yet to score a goal in 3 appearances. In four games Douliazale played a total of 230 minutes, 57.5 minutes per game. In the semi-final game against Nigeria, Douliazale was given a red card, he had already gotten a yellow card earlier in the game.

=== U-20 International Goals ===
| # | Date | Venue | Opponent | Score | Result | Competition |
|---|---|---|---|---|---|---|
| 1 | 11 June 2005 | Stadion Galgenwaard, Utrecht, Netherlands | Spain | 3–1 | 3–1 | 2005 FIFA World Youth Championship |

== Honours ==
Wydad Casablanca

- Moroccan League (1)
  - Champion : 2006
- Coupe du Trône (0)
  - Runner-up : 2004
- Arab Champions League (0)
  - Runner-up : 2008, 2009

Moroccan U-20 National Team

- FIFA World Youth Championship
  - Fourth Place : 2005

== Personal ==
Douliazale started playing soccer at age four. He can also speak French and Arabic.
