= Abdoulaye Samaké =

Malian footballer

Personal information
- Full name: Abdoulaye Samaké
- Date of birth: 29 April 1987 (age 39)
- Place of birth: Mali
- Position: Goalkeeper

International career^{‡}
Years	Team	Apps	(Gls)
2013–2015	Mali	2	(0)
- ‡ National team caps and goals as of 22:11, 8 January 2015 (UTC)

Abdoulaye Samaké (born 29 April 1987) is a Malian professional footballer who currently plays as a goalkeeper.
