= Bachirou Osséni =

Beninese footballer and manager (1985–2019)

Personal information
- Full name: Bachirou Kassimou Osséni
- Date of birth: 15 December 1985
- Place of birth: Porto-Novo, Benin
- Date of death: 22 October 2019 (aged 33)
- Place of death: Benin
- Height: 1.75 m (5 ft 9 in)
- Position: Midfielder

Senior career*
Years	Team	Apps	(Gls)
2003–2005	Olympic Azzaweya		
2005–2006	Soleil FC		
2006	Vitória B	4	(0)
2007	Soleil FC		
2008–2009	Diegem Sport	7	(0)
2009–2010	Bodva Moldava nad Bodvou		
2010–2011	Portonovo SD		
2011–2017	ASOS		
Total		11+	(0+)

International career
- Benin U20
2003–2005	Benin	10	(1)

Managerial career
- Etente Kandi
- * Club domestic league appearances and goals

Bachirou Kassimou Osséni (15 December 1985 – 22 October 2019) was a Beninese football player and manager.

== Career ==
Born in Porto-Novo, Osséni played as a midfielder for Olympic Azzaweya, Soleil FC, Vitória B, Diegem Sport, Bodva Moldava nad Bodvou, Portonovo SD and ASOS.

He earned 10 caps for the Benin national team between 2003 and 2005, scoring 1 goal. He was captain of the under-20 team at the 2005 African Youth Championship.

After retiring as a player he became a manager at Etente Kandi.

== Death ==
He died on 22 October 2019, aged 33.
