= Tefo Maipato =

Mosotho footballer (born 1986)

Personal information
- Date of birth: 9 March 1986 (age 40)
- Place of birth: Lesotho
- Position: Midfielder

Youth career
- Orlando Pirates

Senior career*
Years	Team	Apps	(Gls)
2009-2013	Bantu		
2013-2014	Matlama		
2014-2016	Likhopo		

International career
2006-2008	Lesotho	7	(2)
- * Club domestic league appearances and goals

Tefo Maipato (born 9 March 1986) is a Mosotho retired footballer who is last known to have played as a midfielder for Bantu.

== Career ==
At the age of 16, Maipato joined the youth academy of South African top flight side Orlando Pirates, where he said, ¨When I came home it was because I was tired of waiting for something that wasn’t there... (The) coaches there had said that by 2006 I would be promoted to the first team but I don’t know what happened. It was painful to see players that I played with get promoted while I was stuck in the reserves.¨ In 2009, he signed for Bantu in Lesotho.
