= Thapelo Tshilo =

South African soccer player

Personal information
- Full name: Thapelo Sylvester Tshilo
- Date of birth: 18 February 1985 (age 41)
- Place of birth: Boksburg, South Africa
- Height: 1.90 m (6 ft 3 in)
- Position: Defender

Youth career
- Manchester United (South Africa)
- Watford Brothers
- Jomo Cosmos

Senior career*
Years	Team	Apps	(Gls)
2004–2010	Jomo Cosmos	116	(6)
2010–2013	Mamelodi Sundowns	11	(0)
2011–2012	→ Jomo Cosmos (loan)	4	(0)
2013	Bidvest Wits	0	(0)
2013–2018	Polokwane City	81	(6)
2018–2019	Maccabi	22	(0)
2019–2020	Moroka Swallows	1	(1)

International career
2007	South Africa	1	(0)
- * Club domestic league appearances and goals as of 1 October 2013

Thapelo Sylvester Tshilo (born 18 February 1985) is a South African international footballer who played as a defender.

== Career ==
Born in Boksburg, Gauteng, Tshilo began his career with Jomo Cosmos in 2001, turning professional in 2004. He signed for Mamelodi Sundowns in June 2010 and rejoined Cosmos on loan in 2011. He joined Bidvest Wits in January 2013 but failed to make a single appearance and he was released at the end of the season.

Tshilo joined newly promoted Premier Soccer League team Polokwane City in September 2013.

He also made one international appearance for South Africa in 2007.
