= Mathieu Adeniyi =

Beninese footballer (born 1987)

Personal information
- Full name: Mathieu Adeniyi
- Date of birth: 26 April 1987 (age 39)
- Place of birth: Porto-Novo, Benin
- Height: 1.76 m (5 ft 9 in)
- Position: Defensive midfielder

Team information
- Current team: CPBB Rennes

Youth career
- 2001–2005: Association Sportive Oussou Saka
- 2005–2006: Stade Rennais

Senior career*
Years	Team	Apps	(Gls)
2006–2007	Stade Rennes B	12	(0)
2007–2010	La Vitréenne FC	37	(0)
2010–2011	Stade Rennes B	5	(0)
2011–2013	OC Cesson	6	(0)
2013–	CPBB Rennes		

International career
2005–2007	Benin U-20	12	(0)
2006–2008	Benin	8	(0)
- * Club domestic league appearances and goals

Mathieu Adeniyi (born 26 April 1987 Porto-Novo) is a Beninense football player who plays for CPBB Rennes in France. His name "Adeniyi" means "The Crown is Precious" in the Yoruba language

== Career ==
Adeniyi began his career by Association Sportive Oussou Saka, moved in July 2005 to Stade Rennais F.C., before in November 2007 joined to La Vitréenne FC. On 10 August 2010 left La Vitréenne FC and returned to Stade Rennais F.C., who played his debut after his return on 14 August 2010 for the Reserve team against AS Moulins.

== International career ==
He played with U-20 from Benin U-20 at 2005 FIFA World Youth Championship in the Netherlands.

== Honours ==
- 2007: Champion de France Under 18
