= Islam Siam =

Egyptian footballer (born 1985)

Personal information
- Full name: Islam Essam Siam
- Date of birth: February 13, 1985 (age 41)
- Place of birth: Cairo, Egypt
- Height: 1.88 m (6 ft 2 in)
- Position: Centre back

Team information
- Current team: El Dakhleya

Youth career
- Arab Contractors

Senior career*
Years	Team	Apps	(Gls)
–2006	Arab Contractors		
2006–2007	El-Ittihad		
2007–2008	Al Ahed		
2008–2011	El Shams		
2011–2016	Ghazl El-Mehalla	32	(0)
2016–2017	Al Nasr Lel Taa'den	29	(0)
2017–2019	Pyramids	29	(1)
2019	Petrojet	2	(0)
2019–	El Dakhleya	3	(0)

International career
2002–2005	Egypt U-18	13	(0)
2005–2007	Egypt U-20	24	(1)
2007	Egypt U-23		
- * Club domestic league appearances and goals as of 22:05, 29 April 2019 (UTC)

Islam Siam (born February 13, 1985) is an Egyptian football player who plays as a defender for Egyptian club El Dakhleya SC. He was a member of Egyptian U-21 youth team, participating in 2005 FIFA World Youth Championship held in the Netherlands.

== Honours ==
=== National team ===
- Gold Medalist at Qatar U23 International Tournament 2007.
- Silver Medalist at CAF Youth African Cup 2005.

=== Arab Contractors ===
- Egypt Cup: 2004
