= Daddy Bazuaye =

Nigerian football player

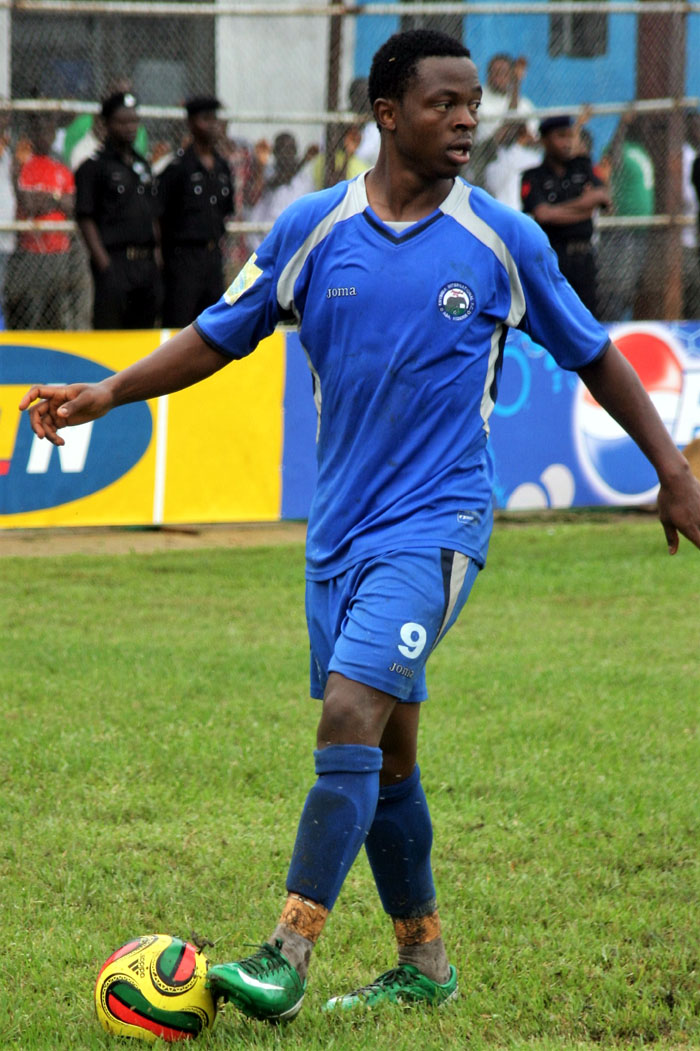
- Daddy Bazuaye, 2010

Personal information
- Date of birth: 11 December 1985 (age 40)
- Place of birth: Lagos, Nigeria
- Height: 1.84 m (6 ft 0 in)
- Position: Midfielder

Team information
- Current team: Warri Wolves
- Number: 8

Senior career*
Years	Team	Apps	(Gls)
2005–2007	Bendel Insurance		
2006–2007	→ Monaco B (loan)	6	(0)
2007–2010	Enyimba		
2010–2012	Niger Tornadoes		
2012–2013	F.C. Cape Town	10	(0)
2014–	Warri Wolves		

International career
2005	Nigeria U-20	2	(0)
- * Club domestic league appearances and goals as of 31 December 2013

Daddy Bazuaye (born 11 December 1990 in Lagos) is a Nigerian football player currently with Warri Wolves.

== Career ==
Bazuaye began his career with Bendel Insurance F.C. and moved in 2006 on loan to AS Monaco where he played 6 games for reserve. He returned to Nigeria and was in 2007 transferred to Enyimba International. He now resides in the United States.

== International ==
Bazuaye was member of the Nigerian team at the 2005 FIFA World Youth Championship in the Netherlands he played 5 games.

== Titles ==
- Vice World Cup winner by 2005 FIFA World Youth Championship with Nigeria.
