= Michael Modubi =

South African soccer player

Personal information
- Full name: Masilo Michael Modubi
- Date of birth: 22 April 1985 (age 41)
- Place of birth: Polokwane, South Africa
- Height: 1.76 m (5 ft 9 in)
- Position

Team information
- Current team: Turkse F.C.

Youth career
- 1992–1994: Real Gunners
- 1995–1996: Ria Stars
- 1996–2003: Transnet Sport School of Excellence
- 2006: Chelsea

Senior career*
Years	Team	Apps	(Gls)
2003–2011	Westerlo	100	(0)
2012–2015	Dessel Sport	4	(0)

International career^{‡}
2006–2008	South Africa U-23		
2007–2015	South Africa	4	(0)

Managerial career
- 2015–2017: Various youth teams
- 2017–: KESK Leopoldsburg
- * Club domestic league appearances and goals as of 13 October 2020 ‡ National team caps and goals as of 13 October 2020

Masilo Michael Modubi (born 22 April 1985) is a South African former soccer player. He currently serves as manager for Belgian club KESK Leopoldsburg. He spent an eight-year spell at Belgian club Westerlo and then three years at Dessel Sport.

== Trivia ==
He began his career 1992 by Real Gunners later in January 1995 moved to Ria Stars, from the Pietersburg based team was 1996 scouted from Transnet Sport School of Excellence in 2003 was sold to Chelsea F.C. in England. The London-based club sold him in July 2003 to K.V.C. Westerlo.
