= Tarik Bendamou =

Moroccan footballer

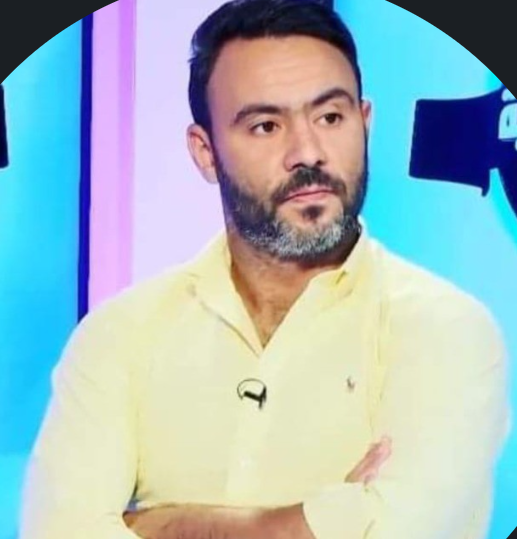

Personal information
- Date of birth: January 14, 1985 (age 41)
- Place of birth: Casablanca, Morocco
- Position: Forward

Youth career
- 1997–2004: Raja CA

Senior career*
Years	Team	Apps	(Gls)
2004–2006	Raja CA	48	(19)
2006–2008	Kawkab Marrakech	22	(17)
2008–2010	R. Charleroi S.C.	27	(14)
2010–2011	Moghreb Tétouan	14	(4)
2011 - 2012	SCC Mohammédia	19	(5)
Total		130	(59)

International career
2000–2006	Morocco U-20	39	(21)

Managerial career
- 2013–2014: Ittihad Bouskoura Academy
- 2014–2015: Anfa Soccer Academy
- 2015–2016: Raja CA U16
- 2016–2017: Raja CA U17
- 2017–2018: Raja CA U18
- 2018–2019: Raja CA U19
- 2020–2021: Difaa Ain Sbaa
- 2021–2022: Chebab Hay Hassani
- 2022–2024: United FC
- 2024: Bandari F.C
- * Club domestic league appearances and goals

Tarik Bendamou (born 14 January 1985) is a Moroccan former professional footballer who played as a forward. He is best known for his time with Raja Casablanca, Kawkab Marrakech, and Belgian side R. Charleroi S.C. Following his retirement as a player, Bendamou pursued a coaching career, working with several youth and senior teams in Morocco and the United Arab Emirates, as well as a short spell with Bandari F.C. in 2024.

Bendamou played for Morocco at the 2005 FIFA World Youth Championship in the Netherlands.

After ending his playing career, Tarik Bendamou transitioned into coaching. He worked extensively in youth development at Raja Casablanca and later coached various clubs in Morocco and abroad.
