= Katleho Moleko =

Mosotho footballer (born 1986)

Personal information
- Full name: Katleho Moleko
- Date of birth: 24 August 1986 (age 40)
- Place of birth: Maseru, Lesotho
- Position: Striker

Team information
- Current team: Likhopo Maseru
- Number: 20

Youth career
- 2001–2003: Ekurhuleni Sports
- 2004–2005: Orlando Pirates

Senior career*
Years	Team	Apps	(Gls)
2006–2008	Orlando Pirates	28	(3)
2009–	Likhopo Maseru	12	(8)

International career^{‡}
2007–	Lesotho	4	(0)
- * Club domestic league appearances and goals ‡ National team caps and goals as of 10:43, 22 December 2009 (UTC)

Katleho Moleko (born 24 August 1986) is a Mosotho footballer who played as a striker.

== Club career ==
Moleko most recently played at the club level for Likhopo Maseru.

== International career ==
Since 2007, he has won four caps for the Lesotho national football team.
