= Nano (Egyptian footballer) =

Egyptian footballer (born 1985)

Personal information
- Full name: Mohamed Mahmoud
- Date of birth: March 24, 1985 (age 41)
- Place of birth: Cairo, Egypt
- Height: 1.73 m (5 ft 8 in)
- Positions: Centre back; defensive midfielder

Team information
- Current team: Wadi Degla

Youth career
- Al Ahly

Senior career*
Years	Team	Apps	(Gls)
2006–2008	Al Ahly	26	(3)
2008–	Wadi Degla		
- * Club domestic league appearances and goals

Mohamed Mahmoud (Arabic: محمد محمود, born March 24, 1985), a.k.a. Nano, is an Egyptian footballer who currently plays for Wadi Degla Sporting Club. Left-footed, he plays as a central defender or defensive midfielder.
