= Amadou Sidibé =

Malian footballer

Personal information
- Date of birth: 19 February 1986 (age 40)
- Place of birth: Bamako, Mali
- Height: 1.73 m (5 ft 8 in)
- Position: Left-back

Senior career*
Years	Team	Apps	(Gls)
2006–2008	Djoliba Athletic Club		
2008–2013	Auxerre B	50	(3)
2008–2013	Auxerre	38	(0)

International career
2008–2011	Mali	13	(0)
- * Club domestic league appearances and goals

Amadou Sidibé (born 19 February 1986) is a Malian former professional footballer who played as a left-back.

== Club career ==
Born in Bamako, Mali, Sidibé began his career at his local club, Cercle Olympique de Bamako.

In 2008, he transferred to AJ Auxerre from Djoliba Athletic Club. In 2015 he joined lower-league side Club Olympique Avallon, before returning to Auxerre in summer 2017.

== International career ==
Sidibé represented his homeland Mali at 2008 Africa Cup of Nations in Ghana.
