= Abdoulaye Ouzérou =

Beninese footballer (born 1985)

Personal information
- Date of birth: 24 October 1985 (age 40)
- Place of birth: Parakou, Benin
- Height: 1.69 m (5 ft 7 in)
- Position: Striker

Youth career
- 2006: Energie FC

Senior career*
Years	Team	Apps	(Gls)
2007–2011	Buffles FC		
2008	→ Al Madina Tripoli (loan)		

International career
2008	Benin	2	(0)
- * Club domestic league appearances and goals

Abdoulaye Ouzérou (born 24 October 1985) is a Beninese former professional footballer who played as a striker.

== Club career ==
Ouzérou was born in Parakou. He began his career with Energie FC and signed with Buffles FC in 2007. He left the club in summer 2008 to join Al Madina Tripoli of the Libyan Premier League on loan.

== International career ==
Ouzérou was called up to the Benin national team as back-up for the 2008 African Cup of Nations in Ghana. His second call up for Benin was on 29 March 2009 against Ghana.
