= Isaac Promise =

Nigerian footballer (1987–2019)

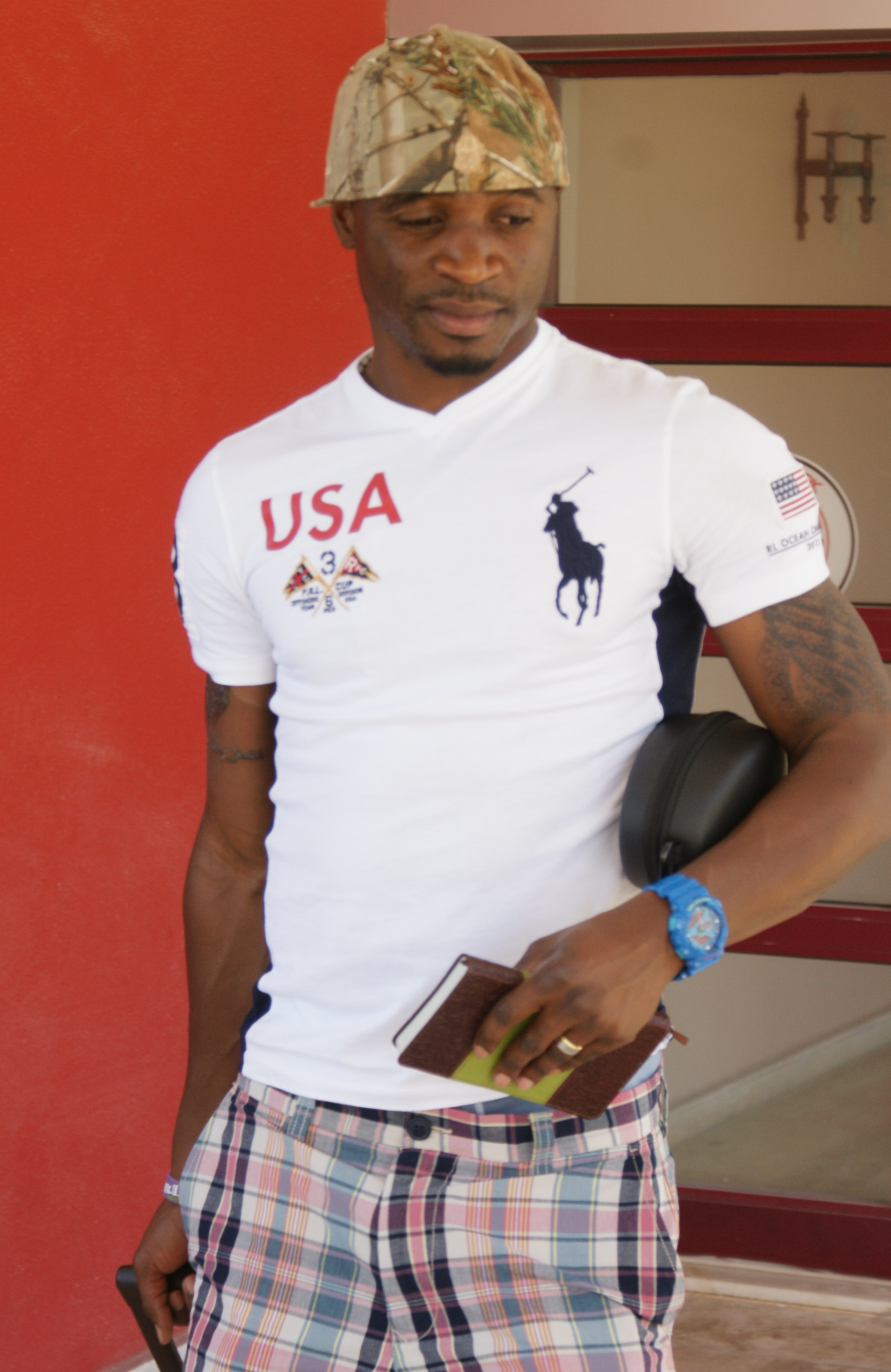
- Promise in 2012

Personal information
- Date of birth: 2 December 1987
- Place of birth: Zaria, Nigeria
- Date of death: 2 October 2019 (aged 31)
- Place of death: Austin, Texas, U.S.
- Position: Striker

Youth career
- 2003–2005: Grays International

Senior career*
Years	Team	Apps	(Gls)
2005–2008	Gençlerbirliği	93	(29)
2008–2010	Trabzonspor	26	(2)
2009–2010	→ Manisaspor (loan)	27	(6)
2010–2012	Manisaspor	69	(16)
2012–2014	Antalyaspor	48	(11)
2014–2015	Al Ahli	4	(1)
2014–2015	Balıkesirspor	13	(3)
2015–2017	Karabükspor	12	(0)
2016–2017	→ Giresunspor (loan)	18	(2)
2018	Georgia Revolution	13	(7)
2019	Austin Bold	20	(3)
Total		343	(80)

International career
2009	Nigeria	3	(1)
- * Club domestic league appearances and goals

Isaac Promise (2 December 1987 – 2 October 2019) was a Nigerian footballer. He was the captain of the football team representing Nigeria which won the silver medal at the 2008 Summer Olympics in Beijing. He played professionally for 14 seasons, much of which was spent in Turkey. He scored a total of 77 club goals during his career.

== Career ==
=== Club career ===
As a promising youngster, Promise went on trials with Nigerian second division side Grays International. Attracting attention from several big name football clubs in Europe, he went on trials with Real Madrid alongside Mikel John Obi, but found the trials unsuccessful. After being linked with Dutch outfit Feyenoord Rotterdam he eventually signed for Süper Lig club Gençlerbirliği in a three-year deal in August 2005.

In the Turkcell Super League 2006-07 season, Promise scored 12 goals. He more than doubled the number of his total goals for Gençlerbirliği. On 15 July 2008, Promise agreed a 4-year deal with Trabzonspor.

With Trabzonspor, he scored two goals in 26 matches. Because of his average performance he was loaned out to Manisaspor for a year. Promise played 27 matches and scored six goals. In the summer of 2010, Manisaspor signed a contract with him. After scoring 11 goals in 30 matches with his now relegated club Manisaspor, he signed a 3-year contract with Antalyaspor.

In February 2015, he signed a six months deal with Balıkesirspor.

In August 2018, it was announced that Promise would join United Soccer League expansion side Austin Bold for the 2019 season.

=== International career ===
Promise was named as the captain of the Nigeria under-23 squad for the 2008 Summer Olympics, being held in China. On 13 August 2008 at Tianjin Olympic Center in Tianjin, Promise scored Nigeria's first goal against the United States in the group stage. Nigeria went ahead to win the match 2–1.

Nigeria ended up winning the silver medal after losing 1–0 to Argentina in the final.

Promise first appeared in the senior team in 2009. He earned 3 caps and scored one goal.

=== Death ===
Promise died of a heart attack on 2 October 2019, at age 31.
