= 2005 FIFA World Youth Championship =

Wereldkampioenschap voetbal onder 20 - 2005

Tournament details
- Host country: Netherlands
- Dates: 10 June – 2 July
- Teams: 24 (from 6 confederations)
- Venue: 6 (in 6 host cities)

Final positions
- Champions: Argentina (5th title)
- Runners-up: Nigeria
- Third place: Brazil
- Fourth place: Morocco

Tournament statistics
- Matches played: 52
- Goals scored: 143 (2.75 per match)
- Attendance: 502,698 (9,667 per match)
- Top scorer: (Argentina) Lionel Messi (6 goals)
- Best player: (Argentina) Lionel Messi
- Fair play award: Colombia

The 2005 FIFA World Youth Championship was the 15th edition of the FIFA World Youth Championship. It took place in the Netherlands between 10 June and 2 July 2005.

== Venues ==
Doetinchem	Emmen	Enschede
De Vijverberg	Univé Stadion	Arke Stadion
Capacity: 12,600	Capacity: 8,600	Capacity: 13,250
51°57′21″N 06°18′35″E	52°46′29″N 06°56′45″E	52°14′12″N 06°50′16″E
2005 FIFA World Youth Championship is located in Netherlands
Kerkrade	Tilburg	Utrecht
Parkstad Limburg Stadion	Willem II Stadion	Stadion Galgenwaard
Capacity: 19,979	Capacity: 14,637	Capacity: 24,500
50°51′25″N 06°00′21″E	51°32′34″N 05°04′01″E	52°04′42″N 05°08′45″E

== Qualification ==
The following 24 teams qualified for the 2005 FIFA World Youth Championship. Host country the Netherlands did not have to qualify for the tournament.

Confederation	Qualifying Tournament	Qualifier(s)
AFC (Asia)	2004 AFC Youth Championship	China; Japan; South Korea; Syria
CAF (Africa)	2005 African Youth Championship	Benin^{1} Egypt; Morocco; Nigeria
CONCACAF (North, Central America and Caribbean)	2005 CONCACAF U-20 Tournament	Canada; Honduras; Panama; United States
CONMEBOL (South America)	2005 South American Youth Championship	Argentina; Brazil; Chile; Colombia
OFC (Oceania)	2005 OFC U-20 Championship	Australia
UEFA (Europe)	Host nation	Netherlands
UEFA (Europe)	2004 UEFA Under-19 Championship	Germany; Italy; Spain; Switzerland^{1} Turkey; Ukraine

1.Teams that made their debut.

== Sponsorship ==
FIFA partners

- Adidas
- Coca-Cola
- Toshiba
- Fujifilm
- MasterCard
- McDonald's
- T-Mobile
- Yahoo
- Hyundai
- Philips
- Avaya

National supporters

- Hubo
- Unive
- FIFA.com
- FIFA Fair Play

== Match officials ==
Confederation	Referee	Assistants
AFC	Khalil Al Ghamdi (Saudi Arabia)	Fatih Arabati (Jordan); Eisa Ghuloum (United Arab Emirates)
AFC	Kwon Jong-chul (South Korea)	Kim Dae-Young (South Korea); Liu Tiejun (China)
CAF	Coffi Codjia (Benin)	Aboudou Aderodjou (Benin); Célestin Ntagungira (Rwanda)
CAF	Essam Abd El Fatah (Egypt)	Beshr Rashwan (Egypt); Luleseged Begashaw (Ethiopia)
CONCACAF	Rodolfo Sibrian (El Salvador)	Carlos Pastrana (Honduras); Reynaldo Salinas (Honduras)
CONCACAF	Benito Archundia (Mexico)	José Ramírez (Mexico); Pedro Rebollar (Mexico)
CONMEBOL	Horacio Elizondo (Argentina)	Darío García (Argentina); Rodolfo Otero (Argentina)
CONMEBOL	Óscar Ruiz (Colombia)	Eduardo Botero (Colombia); Fernando Tamayo (Ecuador)
CONMEBOL	Jorge Larrionda (Uruguay)	Walter Rial (Uruguay); Pablo Fandiño (Uruguay)
OFC	Mark Shield (Australia)	Nathan Gibson (Australia); Ben Wilson (Australia)
UEFA	Claus Bo Larsen (Denmark)	Bill Hansen (Denmark); Anders Norrestrand (Denmark)
UEFA	Terje Hauge (Norway)	Steinar Holvik (Norway); Ole Hermann Borgan (Norway)
UEFA	Luis Medina Cantalejo (Spain)	Victoriano Giráldez Carrasco (Spain); Pedro Medina Hernández (Spain)
UEFA	Massimo Busacca (Switzerland)	Matthias Arnet (Switzerland); Franceso Buragina (Switzerland)
Reserve	Eric Braamhaar (Netherlands)	

== Squads ==
For a list of all squads that played in the final tournament, see 2005 FIFA World Youth Championship squads.

== Group stage ==
The 24 teams were split into six groups of four teams. Six group winners, six second-place finishers and the four best third-place finishers qualify for the knockout round.

=== Group A ===
Pos	Team	Pld	W	D	L	GF	GA	GD	Pts	Group stage result
1	Netherlands (H)	3	3	0	0	6	1	+5	9	Advance to knockout stage
2	Japan	3	0	2	1	3	4	−1	2	Advance to knockout stage
3	Benin	3	0	2	1	2	3	−1	2	
4	Australia	3	0	2	1	2	5	−3	2	

(H) Hosts
10 June 2005
16:00

Benin	1–1	Australia
Omotoyossi 32'	(Report)	Ward 59'

Parkstad Limburg Stadion, Kerkrade
Attendance: 4,500
Referee: Luis Medina Cantalejo (Spain)

10 June 2005
20:00

Netherlands	2–1	Japan
Afellay 7'; Babel 18'	(Report)	Hirayama 68'

Parkstad Limburg Stadion, Kerkrade
Attendance: 19,500
Referee: Óscar Ruiz (Colombia)

15 June 2005
17:30

Japan	1–1	Benin
Mizuno 65'	(Report)	Maïga 37'

Parkstad Limburg Stadion, Kerkrade
Attendance: 12,500
Referee: Claus Bo Larsen (Denmark)

15 June 2005
20:30

Australia	0–3	Netherlands
	(Report)	Maduro 20'; Emanuelson 46'; Kruys 74'

Parkstad Limburg Stadion, Kerkrade
Attendance: 19,500
Referee: Kwon Jong-chul (South Korea)

18 June 2005
16:00

Japan	1–1	Australia
Maeda 87'	(Report)	Townsend 75'

Parkstad Limburg Stadion, Kerkrade
Attendance: 2,000
Referee: Terje Hauge (Norway)

18 June 2005
16:00

Netherlands	1–0	Benin
Maduro 45+2'	(Report)

Willem II Stadion, Tilburg
Attendance: 13,700
Referee: Khalil Al Ghamdi (Saudi Arabia)

=== Group B ===
Pos	Team	Pld	W	D	L	GF	GA	GD	Pts	Group stage result
1	China	3	3	0	0	9	4	+5	9	Advance to knockout stage
2	Ukraine	3	1	1	1	7	6	+1	4	Advance to knockout stage
3	Turkey	3	1	1	1	4	4	0	4	Advance to knockout stage
4	Panama	3	0	0	3	2	8	−6	0	

11 June 2005
17:30

Turkey	1–2	China
Güleç 84'	(Report)	Tan Wangsong 22'; Zhao Xuri 90+5'

Galgenwaard Stadion, Utrecht
Attendance: 10,000
Referee: Eric Braamhaar (Netherlands)

11 June 2005
20:30

Ukraine	3–1	Panama
Aliev 20' (pen.), 22'; Feschuk 32'	(Report)	Arzhanov 26' (o.g.)

Galgenwaard Stadion, Utrecht
Attendance: 2,500
Referee: Khalil Al Ghamdi (Saudi Arabia)

14 June 2005
17:30

China	3–2	Ukraine
Zhu Ting 31'; Chen Tao 66' (pen.); Cui Peng 75'	(Report)	Vorobey 19'; Aliev 70' (pen.)

Galgenwaard Stadion, Utrecht
Attendance: 2,300
Referee: Rodolfo Sibrian (El Salvador)

15 June 2005
20:30

Panama	0–1	Turkey
	(Report)	Güleç 24'

Galgenwaard Stadion, Utrecht
Attendance: 6,100
Referee: Jorge Larrionda (Uruguay)

17 June 2005
20:30

Turkey	2–2	Ukraine
Öztürk 8' (pen.), 53'	(Report)	Aliev 5', 19'

De Vijverberg, Doetinchem
Attendance: 9,500
Referee: Luis Medina Cantalejo (Spain)

17 June 2005
20:30

China	4–1	Panama
Zhou Haibin 6'; Gao Lin 40'; Hao Junmin 51'; Lu Lin 78'	(Report)	Venegas 37'

Galgenwaard Stadion, Utrecht
Attendance: 4,000
Referee: Essam Abd El Fatah (Egypt)

=== Group C ===
Pos	Team	Pld	W	D	L	GF	GA	GD	Pts	Group stage result
1	Spain	3	3	0	0	13	1	+12	9	Advance to knockout stage
2	Morocco	3	2	0	1	7	3	+4	6	Advance to knockout stage
3	Chile	3	1	0	2	7	8	−1	3	Advance to knockout stage
4	Honduras	3	0	0	3	0	15	−15	0	

11 June 2005
17:30

Spain	3–1	Morocco
Llorente 28'; Molinero 51'; Silva 71'	(Report)	Doulyazal 84' (pen.)

De Vijverberg, Doetinchem
Attendance: 9,863
Referee: Jorge Larrionda (Uruguay)

11 June 2005
20:30

Honduras	0–7	Chile
	(Report)	Parada 11', 71'; Fuenzalida 30', 53'; Fernández 67'; Jara 69'; Morales 77'

De Vijverberg, Doetinchem
Attendance: 6,800
Referee: Massimo Busacca (Switzerland)

14 June 2005
17:30

Morocco	5–0	Honduras
Iajour 31', 43'; Bendamou 55'; Benjelloun 81'; Chihi 90'	(Report)

De Vijverberg, Doetinchem
Attendance: 5,985
Referee: Khalil Al Ghamdi (Saudi Arabia)

15 June 2005
20:30

Chile	0–7	Spain
	(Report)	Llorente 8', 62', 78', 81'; Robusté 51'; Silva 71', 85'

De Vijverberg, Doetinchem
Attendance: 6,600
Referee: Benito Archundia (Mexico)

17 June 2005
17:30

Spain	3–0	Honduras
Soriano 5'; Silva 38'; Casadesús 67'	(Report)

De Vijverberg, Doetinchem
Attendance: 3,000
Referee: Coffi Codjia (Benin)

17 June 2005
17:30

Morocco	1–0	Chile
Bendamou 45+2'	(Report)

Galgenwaard Stadion, Utrecht
Attendance: 11,000
Referee: Mark Shield (Australia)

=== Group D ===
Pos	Team	Pld	W	D	L	GF	GA	GD	Pts	Group stage result
1	United States	3	2	1	0	2	0	+2	7	Advance to knockout stage
2	Argentina	3	2	0	1	3	1	+2	6	Advance to knockout stage
3	Germany	3	1	1	1	2	1	+1	4	Advance to knockout stage
4	Egypt	3	0	0	3	0	5	−5	0	

11 June 2005
17:30

Argentina	0–1	United States
	(Report)	Barrett 39'

Arke Stadion, Enschede
Attendance: 10,500
Referee: Terje Hauge (Norway)

11 June 2005
20:30

Germany	2–0	Egypt
Adler 75'; Matip 90+3'	(Report)

Arke Stadion, Enschede
Attendance: 10,500
Referee: Rodolfo Sibrian (El Salvador)

14 June 2005
17:30

Egypt	0–2	Argentina
	(Report)	Messi 47'; Zabaleta 90+1'

Arke Stadion, Enschede
Attendance: 8,500
Referee: Massimo Busacca (Switzerland)

14 June 2005
20:30

United States	0–0	Germany
	(Report)

Arke Stadion, Enschede
Attendance: 10,350
Referee: Óscar Ruiz (Colombia)

18 June 2005
13:30

Argentina	1–0	Germany
Cardozo 43'	(Report)

Univé Stadion, Emmen
Attendance: 8,600
Referee: Benito Archundia (Mexico)

18 June 2005
13:30

United States	1–0	Egypt
Peterson 56'	(Report)

Arke Stadion, Enschede
Attendance: 7,600
Referee: Kwon Jong-chul (South Korea)

=== Group E ===
Pos	Team	Pld	W	D	L	GF	GA	GD	Pts	Group stage result
1	Colombia	3	3	0	0	6	0	+6	9	Advance to knockout stage
2	Syria	3	1	1	1	3	4	−1	4	Advance to knockout stage
3	Italy	3	1	0	2	5	5	0	3	Advance to knockout stage
4	Canada	3	0	1	2	2	7	−5	1	

12 June 2005
17:30

Colombia	2–0	Italy
Rentería 76'; Guarín 93'	(Report)

Willem II Stadion, Tilburg
Attendance: 7,000
Referee: Mark Shield (Australia)

12 June 2005
20:30

Syria	1–1	Canada
Al Haj 2'	(Report)	Peters 31'

Willem II Stadion, Tilburg
Attendance: 3,500
Referee: Claus Bo Larsen (Denmark)

15 June 2005
17:30

Canada	0–2	Colombia
	(Report)	Falcao 81'; Guarín 88'

Willem II Stadion, Tilburg
Attendance: 6,500
Referee: Essam Abd El Fatah (Egypt)

15 June 2005
20:30

Italy	1–2	Syria
Coda 69'	(Report)	Al Hussain 37'; Al Hamawi 73'

Willem II Stadion, Tilburg
Attendance: 2,500
Referee: Horacio Elizondo (Argentina)

18 June 2005
13:30

Italy	4–1	Canada
Pellè 23', 68'; Galloppa 47'; De Martino 90'	(Report)	De Jong 49'

Parkstad Limburg Stadion, Kerkrade
Attendance: 2,000
Referee: Jorge Larrionda (Uruguay)

18 June 2005
16:00

Colombia	2–0	Syria
Rodallega 62'; Falcao 90'	(Report)

Willem II Stadion, Tilburg
Attendance: 11,000
Referee: Massimo Busacca (Switzerland)

=== Group F ===
Pos	Team	Pld	W	D	L	GF	GA	GD	Pts	Group stage result
1	Brazil	3	2	1	0	3	0	+3	7	Advance to knockout stage
2	Nigeria	3	1	1	1	4	2	+2	4	Advance to knockout stage
3	South Korea	3	1	0	2	3	5	−2	3	
4	Switzerland	3	1	0	2	2	5	−3	3	

12 June 2005
17:30

Brazil	0–0	Nigeria
	(Report)

Univé Stadion, Emmen
Attendance: 8,500
Referee: Luis Medina Cantalejo (Spain)

12 June 2005
20:30

South Korea	1–2	Switzerland
Shin Young-rok 25'	(Report)	Antić 28'; Vonlanthen 33'

Univé Stadion, Emmen
Attendance: 8,000
Referee: Coffi Codjia (Benin)

15 June 2005
17:30

Switzerland	0–1	Brazil
	(Report)	Gladstone 14'

Univé Stadion, Emmen
Attendance: 8,200
Referee: Mark Shield (Australia)

15 June 2005
20:30

Nigeria	1–2	South Korea
Abwo 18'	(Report)	Park Chu-young 89'; Baek Ji-hoon 90+2'

Univé Stadion, Emmen
Attendance: 8,500
Referee: Terje Hauge (Norway)

18 June 2005
16:00

Brazil	2–0	South Korea
Renato Ribeiro 9'; Rafael Sóbis 57'	(Report)

Univé Stadion, Emmen
Attendance: 8,600
Referee: Claus Bo Larsen (Denmark)

18 June 2005
16:00

Nigeria	3–0	Switzerland
Obasi 49'; Mikel 59' (pen.); Promise 85'	(Report)

Arke Stadion, Enschede
Attendance: 8,000
Referee: Óscar Ruiz (Colombia)

=== Ranking of third-placed teams ===
Pos	Grp	Team	Pld	W	D	L	GF	GA	GD	Pts	Result
1	D	Germany	3	1	1	1	2	1	+1	4	Advance to knockout stage
2	B	Turkey	3	1	1	1	4	4	0	4	Advance to knockout stage
3	E	Italy	3	1	0	2	5	5	0	3	Advance to knockout stage
4	C	Chile	3	1	0	2	7	8	−1	3	Advance to knockout stage
5	F	South Korea	3	1	0	2	3	5	−2	3	
6	A	Benin	3	0	2	1	2	3	−1	2	

== Knockout stage ==
=== Bracket ===
Round of 16
21 June – Tilburg
China	2
Germany	3
21 June – Tilburg
Brazil	1
Syria	0
22 June – Emmen
Colombia	1
Argentina	2
22 June – Emmen
Spain	3
Turkey	0
21 June – Enschede
Morocco	1
Japan	0
21 June – Enschede
United States	1
Italy	3
22 June – Doetinchem
Nigeria	1
Ukraine	0
22 June – Doetinchem
Netherlands	3
Chile	0

Quarter-finals
24 June – Tilburg
Germany	1
Brazil (a.e.t.)	2
25 June – Enschede
Argentina	3
Spain	1
24 June – Utrecht
Morocco (p)	2 (4)
Italy	2 (2)
25 June – Kerkrade
Nigeria (p)	1 (10)
Netherlands	1 (9)

Semi-finals
28 June – Utrecht
Brazil	1
Argentina	2
28 June – Kerkrade
Morocco	0
Nigeria	3

Final
2 July – Utrecht
Argentina	2
Nigeria	1
Third place play-off
2 July – Utrecht
Brazil	2
Morocco	1

=== Round of 16 ===
21 June 2005
17:30

United States	1–3	Italy
Freeman 44' (pen.)	(Report)	Galloppa 54'; Pellè 62'; Kljestan 75' (o.g.)

Arke Stadion, Enschede
Attendance: 7,000
Referee: Essam Abd El Fatah (Egypt)

21 June 2005
17:30

China	2–3	Germany
Chen Tao 4', 20' (pen.)	(Report)	Gentner 5'; Adler 30'; Matip 89'

Willem II Stadion, Tilburg
Attendance: 9,000
Referee: Horacio Elizondo (Argentina)

21 June 2005
20:30

Morocco	1–0	Japan
Iajour 90+2'	(Report)

Arke Stadion, Enschede
Attendance: 11,800
Referee: Massimo Busacca (Switzerland)

21 June 2005
20:30

Brazil	1–0	Syria
Rafinha 43' (pen.)	(Report)

Willem II Stadion, Tilburg
Attendance: 11,000
Referee: Benito Archundia (Mexico)

22 June 2005
17:30

Nigeria	1–0	Ukraine
Taiwo 80'	(Report)

De Vijverberg, Doetinchem
Attendance: 9,600
Referee: Kwon Jong-chul (South Korea)

22 June 2005
17:30

Colombia	1–2	Argentina
Otálvaro 52'	(Report)	Messi 58'; Barroso 90+3'

Univé Stadion, Emmen
Attendance: 8,400
Referee: Claus Bo Larsen (Denmark)

22 June 2005
20:30

Netherlands	3–0	Chile
Babel 3'; Quincy 73'; John 80'	(Report)

De Vijverberg, Doetinchem
Attendance: 9,600
Referee: Rodolfo Sibrian (El Salvador)

22 June 2005
20:30

Spain	3–0	Turkey
Juanfran 28', 36'; Robusté 69'	(Report)

Univé Stadion, Emmen
Attendance: 8,400
Referee: Terje Hauge (Norway)

=== Quarter-finals ===
24 June 2005
17:30

Morocco	2–2 (a.e.t.)	Italy
El-Zhar 26'; Battagia 93' (o.g.)	(Report)	Canini 74'; Pellè 112'
Penalties
Rabeh (penalty scored); Doulyazal (penalty missed); Iajour (penalty scored); El-Amrani (penalty scored); El-Zhar (penalty scored)	4–2	(penalty missed) Galloppa; (penalty missed) Agnelli; (penalty scored) Pellè; (penalty scored) Carotti

Galgenwaard Stadion, Utrecht
Attendance: 20,000
Referee: Kwon Jong-chul (South Korea)

24 June 2005
20:30

Germany	1–2 (a.e.t.)	Brazil
Huber 68'	(Report)	Diego Tardelli 82'; Rafinha 99'

Willem II Stadion, Tilburg
Attendance: 10,000
Referee: Mark Shield (Australia)

25 June 2005
15:30

Nigeria	1–1 (a.e.t.)	Netherlands
Owoeri 1'	(Report)	Vlaar 46'
Penalties
Taiwo (penalty scored); Sambo (penalty scored); Adefemi (penalty scored); Atulewa (penalty missed); Promise (penalty scored); Adedeji (penalty missed); Mikel (penalty scored); Apam (penalty scored); Kaita (penalty scored); Adeleye (penalty scored); Vanzekin (penalty scored); Taiwo (penalty scored)	10–9	(penalty scored) John; (penalty scored) Babel; (penalty scored) Vlaar; (penalty missed) Kruys; (penalty scored) Maduro; (penalty missed) Zuiverloon; (penalty scored) Drost; (penalty scored) Vincken; (penalty scored) Otten; (penalty scored) Tiendalli; (penalty scored) Vermeer; (penalty missed) John

Parkstad Limburg Stadion, Kerkrade
Attendance: 19,500
Referee: Horacio Elizondo (Argentina)

25 June 2005
20:30

Argentina	3–1	Spain
Zabaleta 19'; Oberman 71'; Messi 73'	(Report)	Zapater 32'

Arke Stadion, Enschede
Attendance: 11,200
Referee: Benito Archundia (Mexico)

=== Semi-finals ===
28 June 2005
17:30

Brazil	1–2	Argentina
Renato Ribeiro 75'	(Report)	Messi 7'; Zabaleta 90+3'

Galgenwaard Stadion, Utrecht
Attendance: 16,500
Referee: Massimo Busacca (Switzerland)

28 June 2005
20:30

Morocco	0–3	Nigeria
	(Report)	Taiwo 34'; Adefemi 70'; Obasi 75'

Parkstad Limburg Stadion, Kerkrade
Attendance: 17,000
Referee: Jorge Larrionda (Uruguay)

=== Third place play-off ===
2 July 2005
17:00

Brazil	2–1	Morocco
Fábio Santos 88'; Edcarlos 90+1'	(Report)	Edcarlos 45+2' (o.g.)

Galgenwaard Stadion, Utrecht
Attendance: 20,000
Referee: Luis Medina Cantalejo (Spain)

=== Final ===
2 July 2005
20:00

Argentina	2–1	Nigeria
Messi 40' (pen.), 75' (pen.)	Report	Obasi 53'

Galgenwaard Stadion, Utrecht
Attendance: 24,500
Referee: Terje Hauge (Norway)

== Winners ==
2005 FIFA World Youth champions

Argentina
Fifth title

== Goalscorers ==
6 goals

- (Argentina) Lionel Messi

5 goals

- (Spain) Fernando Llorente
- (Ukraine) Oleksandr Aliev

4 goals

- (Italy) Graziano Pellè
- (Spain) David Silva

3 goals

- (Argentina) Pablo Zabaleta
- (China) Chen Tao
- (Morocco) Mouhcine Iajour
- (Nigeria) Chinedu Obasi

2 goals

- (Brazil) Rafinha
- (Brazil) Renato Ribeiro
- (Chile) José Pedro Fuenzalida
- (Chile) Ricardo Parada
- (Colombia) Radamel Falcao
- (Colombia) Fredy Guarín
- (Germany) Nicky Adler
- (Germany) Marvin Matip
- (Italy) Daniele Galloppa
- (Morocco) Tarik Bendamou
- (Netherlands) Ryan Babel
- (Netherlands) Hedwiges Maduro
- (Nigeria) Taye Taiwo
- (Spain) Juanfran
- (Spain) Miquel Robusté
- (Turkey) Gökhan Güleç
- (Turkey) Sezer Öztürk

1 goal

- (Argentina) Julio Barroso
- (Argentina) Neri Cardozo
- (Argentina) Gustavo Oberman
- (Australia) Ryan Townsend
- (Australia) Nick Ward
- (Benin) Abou Maiga
- (Benin) Razak Omotoyossi
- (Brazil) Diego Tardelli
- (Brazil) Edcarlos
- (Brazil) Gladstone
- (Brazil) Fábio Santos
- (Brazil) Rafael Sobis
- (Canada) Marcel de Jong
- (Canada) Jaime Peters
- (Chile) Matías Fernández
- (Chile) Gonzalo Jara
- (Chile) Pedro Morales
- (China) Cui Peng
- (China) Hao Junmin
- (China) Gao Lin
- (China) Lu Lin
- (China) Tan Wangsong
- (China) Zhao Xuri
- (China) Zhou Haibin
- (China) Zhu Ting
- (Colombia) Harrison Otálvaro
- (Colombia) Wason Rentería
- (Colombia) Hugo Rodallega
- (Germany) Christian Gentner
- (Germany) Alexander Huber
- (Italy) Michele Canini
- (Italy) Andrea Coda
- (Italy) Raffaele De Martino
- (Japan) Sota Hirayama
- (Japan) Shunsuke Maeda
- (Japan) Koki Mizuno
- (Morocco) Abdessalam Benjelloun
- (Morocco) Adil Chihi
- (Morocco) Reda Doulyazal
- (Morocco) Nabil El Zhar
- (Netherlands) Quincy Owusu-Abeyie
- (Netherlands) Ibrahim Afellay
- (Netherlands) Urby Emanuelson
- (Netherlands) Collins John
- (Netherlands) Rick Kruys
- (Netherlands) Ron Vlaar
- (Nigeria) David Abwo
- (Nigeria) Olubayo Adefemi
- (Nigeria) Isaac Promise
- (Nigeria) Mikel John Obi
- (Nigeria) John Owoeri
- (Panama) José Venegas
- (South Korea) Baek Ji-hoon
- (South Korea) Park Chu-young
- (South Korea) Shin Young-rok
- (Spain) Jonathan Soriano
- (Spain) Francisco Molinero
- (Spain) Víctor Casadesús
- (Spain) Alberto Zapater
- (Switzerland) Goran Antić
- (Switzerland) Johan Vonlanthen
- (Syria) Majed Al Haj
- (Syria) Mohamad Al Hamawi
- (Syria) Abdelrazaq Al Hussain
- (Ukraine) Maxym Feschuk
- (Ukraine) Dmytro Vorobey
- (United States) Chad Barrett
- (United States) Hunter Freeman
- (United States) Jacob Peterson

== Awards ==
Golden Shoe	Golden Ball	FIFA Fair Play Award
(Argentina) Lionel Messi	(Argentina) Lionel Messi	Colombia

== Final ranking ==
Pos	Team	Pld	W	D	L	GF	GA	GD	Pts	Final result
1	Argentina	7	6	0	1	12	5	+7	18	Champions
2	Nigeria	7	3	2	2	10	5	+5	11	Runners-up
3	Brazil	7	5	1	1	9	4	+5	16	Third place
4	Morocco	7	3	1	3	11	10	+1	10	Fourth place
5	Netherlands (H)	5	4	1	0	10	2	+8	13	Eliminated in Quarter-finals
6	Spain	5	4	0	1	17	4	+13	12	Eliminated in Quarter-finals
7	Italy	5	2	1	2	10	8	+2	7	Eliminated in Quarter-finals
8	Germany	5	2	1	2	6	5	+1	7	Eliminated in Quarter-finals
9	Colombia	4	3	0	1	7	2	+5	9	Eliminated in Round of 16
10	China	4	3	0	1	11	7	+4	9	Eliminated in Round of 16
11	United States	4	2	1	1	3	3	0	7	Eliminated in Round of 16
12	Ukraine	4	1	1	2	7	7	0	4	Eliminated in Round of 16
13	Syria	4	1	1	2	3	5	−2	4	Eliminated in Round of 16
14	Turkey	4	1	1	2	4	7	−3	4	Eliminated in Round of 16
15	Chile	4	1	0	3	7	11	−4	3	Eliminated in Round of 16
16	Japan	4	0	2	2	3	5	−2	2	Eliminated in Round of 16
17	South Korea	3	1	0	2	3	5	−2	3	Eliminated in Group stage
18	Switzerland	3	1	0	2	2	5	−3	3	Eliminated in Group stage
19	Benin	3	0	2	1	2	3	−1	2	Eliminated in Group stage
20	Australia	3	0	2	1	2	5	−3	2	Eliminated in Group stage
21	Canada	3	0	1	2	2	7	−5	1	Eliminated in Group stage
22	Egypt	3	0	0	3	0	5	−5	0	Eliminated in Group stage
23	Panama	3	0	0	3	2	8	−6	0	Eliminated in Group stage
24	Honduras	3	0	0	3	0	15	−15	0	Eliminated in Group stage

Source: rsssf.com
(H) Hosts
