= Benin national under-20 football team =

National under-20 association football team representing Benin

Benin U-20
- Nickname(s): Les Guépards (The Cheetahs); Formerly: Les Ecureuils (The Squirrels)
- Association: Benin Football Federation
- Confederation: CAF (Africa)
- Sub-confederation: WAFU (West Africa)
- Home stadium: Stade de l'Amitié
First colours	Second colours

U-20 Africa Cup of Nations
- Appearances: 3 (first in 2005)
- Best result: Third place (2005)

FIFA U-20 World Cup
- Appearances: 1 (first in 2005)
- Best result: Group stage (2005)

The Benin national under-20 football team, nicknamed the Cheetahs, represents Benin in international youth football competitions. Its primary role is the development of players in preparation for the senior national team. The team competes in a variety of competitions, including the biennial FIFA U-20 World Cup and the U-20 Africa Cup of Nations, which is the top competitions for this age group.

The team has participated in the 2005 FIFA U-20 World Cup in the Netherlands. They also participated in the 2005 African Youth Championship in Benin where they got the third place.

== Competition records ==
Champions Runners-up Third place Fourth place

=== FIFA U-20 World Cup record ===
FIFA U-20 World Cup
Year	Result	GP	W	D	L	GS	GA	GD
(Tunisia) 1977	did not qualify							
(Japan) 1979	did not qualify							
(Australia) 1981	did not qualify							
(Mexico) 1983	did not qualify							
(Soviet Union) 1985	did not qualify							
(Chile) 1987	did not qualify							
(Saudi Arabia) 1989	did not qualify							
(Portugal) 1991	did not qualify							
(Australia) 1993	did not qualify							
(Qatar) 1995	did not qualify							
(Malaysia) 1997	did not qualify							
(Nigeria) 1999	did not qualify							
(Argentina) 2001	did not qualify							
(United Arab Emirates) 2003	did not qualify							
(Netherlands) 2005	Group Stage	3	0	2	1	2	3	−1
(Canada) 2007	did not qualify							
(Egypt) 2009	did not qualify							
(Colombia) 2011	did not qualify							
(Turkey) 2013	did not qualify							
(New Zealand) 2015	did not qualify							
(South Korea) 2017	did not qualify							
(Poland) 2019	did not qualify							
(Argentina) 2023	did not qualify							
(Chile) 2025	did not qualify							
(Azerbaijan) (Uzbekistan) 2027	did not qualify							
(Armenia) (Georgia (country)) 2029	To be determined							
Total	1/26	3	0	2	1	2	3	−1

=== Africa U-20 Cup of Nations record ===
Africa U-20 Cup of Nations
Year	Result	GP	W	D	L	GS	GA	GD
1979	did not qualify							
1981	did not qualify							
1983	did not qualify							
1985	did not qualify							
1987	did not qualify							
1989	did not qualify							
(Egypt) 1991	did not qualify							
(Mauritius) 1993	did not qualify							
(Nigeria) 1995	did not qualify							
(Morocco) 1997	did not qualify							
(Ghana) 1999	did not qualify							
(Ethiopia) 2001	did not qualify							
(Burkina Faso) 2003	did not qualify							
(Benin) 2005	Third place	5	1	3	1	9	9	0
(Republic of the Congo) 2007	did not qualify							
(Democratic Republic of the Congo) 2009	did not qualify							
(South Africa) 2011	did not qualify							
(Algeria) 2013	Group stage	3	0	1	2	0	2	-2
(Senegal) 2015	did not qualify							
(Zambia) 2017	did not qualify							
(Niger) 2019	did not qualify							
(Mauritania) 2021	did not qualify							
(Egypt) 2023	Quarter finals	4	0	2	2	1	2	-1
(Egypt) 2025	did not qualify							
(Ghana) 2027	did not qualify							
Total	Third place	12	1	6	5	10	13	-3

== Head-to-head record ==
The following table shows Benin's head-to-head record in the FIFA U-20 World Cup.

Opponent	Pld	W	D	L	GF	GA	GD	Win %
Australia	1	0	1	0	1	1	+0	0.00
Japan	1	0	1	0	1	1	+0	0.00
Netherlands	1	0	0	1	0	1	−1	0.00
Total	3	0	2	1	2	3	−1	0.00

== See also ==
- Benin national football team
- Benin national under-17 football team
