= 2005 South American U-20 Championship squads =

Below are the rosters for the 2005 South American U-20 Championship tournament held in Colombia. The ten national teams involved in the tournament were required to register a squad of 20 players; only players in these squads are eligible to take part in the tournament.

Players name marked in bold have been capped at full international level.

== Argentina ==
Head coach: Hugo Tocalli (Argentina)

No.	Pos.	Player	Date of birth (age)	Caps	Goals	Club
1	GK	**Óscar Ustari**	3 July 1986 (aged 18)	0	0	(Argentine Football Association) Independiente
2	DF	**Ezequiel Garay**	10 October 1986 (aged 18)	0	0	(Argentine Football Association) Newell's Old Boys
3	DF	Mauro Zanotti	14 January 1985 (aged 19)			(Italian Football Federation) Ternana
4	DF	David Abraham	15 July 1986 (aged 18)			(Argentine Football Association) Independiente
5	MF	Juan Manuel Torres	20 June 1985 (aged 19)			(Argentine Football Association) Racing Club
6	DF	Julio Barroso	16 January 1985 (aged 19)			(Argentine Football Association) Boca Juniors
7	FW	**Ezequiel Lavezzi**	3 May 1985 (aged 19)			(Argentine Football Association) San Lorenzo
8	MF	**Pablo Zabaleta**	16 January 1985 (aged 19)			(Argentine Football Association) San Lorenzo
9	FW	**Mauro Boselli**	22 May 1985 (aged 19)			(Argentine Football Association) Boca Juniors
10	MF	**Pablo Barrientos**	17 January 1985 (aged 19)			(Argentine Football Association) San Lorenzo
11	MF	Marcelo Bravo	10 January 1985 (aged 20)			(Argentine Football Association) Vélez Sársfield
12	GK	Nereo Champagne	20 January 1985 (aged 19)			(Argentine Football Association) San Lorenzo
13	DF	**Jonathan Maidana**	29 July 1985 (aged 19)			(Argentine Football Association) Los Andes
14	DF	Lautaro Formica	27 January 1986 (aged 18)			(Argentine Football Association) Newell's Old Boys
15	MF	**Lucas Biglia**	30 January 1986 (aged 18)			(Argentine Football Association) Argentinos Juniors
16	MF	**Neri Cardozo**	8 August 1986 (aged 18)			(Argentine Football Association) Boca Juniors
17	MF	**José Ernesto Sosa**	19 June 1985 (aged 19)	0	0	(Argentine Football Association) Estudiantes
18	FW	**Lionel Messi**	24 June 1987 (aged 17)	0	0	(Royal Spanish Football Federation) Barcelona
19	FW	Federico Almerares	2 May 1985 (aged 19)			(Argentine Football Association) River Plate
20	FW	Hernán Peirone	28 May 1986 (aged 18)			(Argentine Football Association) San Lorenzo

(Source for player names:)

== Bolivia ==
Head coach: Walter Roque (Uruguay)

No.	Pos.	Player	Date of birth (age)	Caps	Goals	Club
-	GK	Richard Ríos Ayala	11 June 1986 (aged 18)			(Bolivian Football Federation) Universitario de Sucre
-	GK	Alex Arias Jaramillo	4 July 1985 (aged 19)			(Bolivian Football Federation) Unión Central
-	DF	Luis Torrico	14 September 1986 (aged 18)			(Bolivian Football Federation) Club Bolívar
-	DF	Juan Carlos Sánchez	1 March 1985 (aged 19)			(Bolivian Football Federation) Club Aurora
-	DF	**Carlos Tordoya**	31 July 1987 (aged 17)			(Bolivian Football Federation) Academia Tahuichi
-	DF	Gerson García	24 April 1985 (aged 19)			(Bolivian Football Federation) San José
-	DF	Eduardo Melgar	15 December 1985 (aged 19)			(Bolivian Football Federation) Oriente Petrolero
-	DF	Jorge Beltrán Téllez	3 September 1985 (aged 19)			(Bolivian Football Federation) Unión Central
-	DF	Félix Candia	7 February 1987 (aged 17)			(Bolivian Football Federation) Club Blooming
-	DF	Ulises Morón	9 August 1988 (aged 16)			(Bolivian Football Federation) Academia Tahuichi
-	MF	**Damir Miranda**	6 October 1985 (aged 19)			(Bolivian Football Federation) Club Destroyers
-	MF	Javier Guzmán Panozo	23 January 1987 (aged 17)			(Bolivian Football Federation) Jorge Wilstermann
-	MF	Daniel Tórrez Egüez	20 July 1986 (aged 18)			(Bolivian Football Federation) Primero de Mayo
-	MF	Mauricio Alejandro Ramirez	28 May 1985 (aged 19)			(Bolivian Football Federation) Club Aurora
-	MF	**Mauricio Saucedo**	14 August 1985 (aged 19)			(Bolivian Football Federation) La Paz Fútbol Club
-	MF	Erick Melgar	20 November 1985 (aged 19)			(Bolivian Football Federation) Cooper
-	FW	Víctor Hugo Angola	14 August 1986 (aged 18)			(Bolivian Football Federation) The Strongest
-	FW	**Eduardo Fierro**	23 June 1988 (aged 16)			(Bolivian Football Federation) Club Blooming
-	FW	Ramiro Berrios	16 March 1985 (aged 19)			(Bolivian Football Federation) Club Iberoamericana
-	FW	**Nelson Sossa**	14 March 1986 (aged 18)			(Bolivian Football Federation) Jorge Wilstermann

(Source for player names:)

== Brazil ==
Coach: Renê Weber (Brazil)

No.	Pos.	Player	Date of birth (age)	Caps	Club
1	GK	Renan	24 January 1985 (aged 19)		(Brazil) Internacional
2	DF	**Rafinha**	6 May 1983 (aged 21)		(Brazil) Coritiba
3	DF	Leonardo	9 March 1985 (aged 19)		(Brazil) Santos
4	DF	Edcarlos	10 May 1985 (aged 19)		(Brazil) Sao Paulo
5	MF	Roberto Sousa	18 January 1985 (aged 19)		(Brazil) Guarani
6	DF	**Filipe Luís**	9 August 1985 (aged 19)		(Netherlands) Ajax
7	MF	Alê	21 January 1986 (aged 18)		(Brazil) Sao Paulo
8	MF	**Fernandinho**	4 May 1985 (aged 19)		(Brazil) Atlético-PR
9	FW	Diego Barcelos	5 March 1986 (aged 18)		(Brazil) Internacional
10	MF	Renato Ribeiro	28 April 1985 (aged 19)		(Brazil) Atlético Mineiro
11	FW	**Rafael Sóbis**	17 June 1985 (aged 19)		(Brazil) Internacional
12	GK	Bruno Landgraf	1 May 1983 (aged 21)		(Brazil) Sao Paulo
13	DF	Rodrigo Dias	18 July 1985 (aged 19)		(Brazil) Atlético Mineiro
14	DF	João Leonardo	25 June 1985 (aged 19)		(Brazil) Guarani
15	DF	Gladstone	29 January 1985 (aged 19)		(Brazil) Cruzeiro
16	MF	**Diego Souza**	17 May 1984 (aged 20)		(Brazil) Fluminense
17	MF	Amparo	1 August 1985 (aged 19)		(Brazil) Palmeiras
18	MF	Evandro	23 August 1986 (aged 18)		(Brazil) Atlético-PR
19	FW	Paulinho Betanin	10 January 1986 (aged 19)		(Brazil) Juventude
20	FW	Thiago Quirino	4 January 1985 (aged 20)		(Brazil) Atlético Mineiro

(Source for player names:)

== Chile ==
Coach: José Sulantay (Chile)

No.	Pos.	Player	Date of birth (age)	Caps	Goals	Club
1	GK	Carlos Espinoza	20 September 1986 (aged 18)			(Football Federation of Chile) O'Higgins
2	DF	Edson Riquelme	29 August 1985 (aged 19)			(Football Federation of Chile) Concepción
3	MF	Cristóbal Aliste	11 January 1985 (aged 20)			(Football Federation of Chile) Cobresal
4	DF	Sebastián Montesinos	12 March 1986 (aged 18)			(Football Federation of Chile) Colo-Colo
5	DF	Eduardo Salazar	3 January 1986 (aged 19)			(Football Federation of Chile) Cobresal
6	MF	Ángel Rojas	10 April 1985 (aged 19)			(Football Federation of Chile) Universidad de Chile
7	MF	**Fernando Meneses**	27 September 1985 (aged 19)			(Football Federation of Chile) Colo-Colo
8	MF	Iván Vásquez	13 August 1985 (aged 19)			(Football Federation of Chile) Universidad Católica
9	FW	**Nicolás Canales**	27 June 1985 (aged 19)			(Football Federation of Chile) Universidad de Chile
10	MF	**Pedro Morales**	25 May 1985 (aged 19)			(Football Federation of Chile) Huachipato
11	FW	**Juan Lorca**	15 January 1985 (aged 19)			(Football Federation of Chile) Colo-Colo
12	GK	Carlos Arias	4 September 1986 (aged 18)			(Football Federation of Chile) Universidad Católica
13	DF	Felipe Muñoz	4 April 1985 (aged 19)			(Football Federation of Chile) Colo-Colo
14	MF	**Matías Fernández**	15 May 1986 (aged 18)			(Football Federation of Chile) Colo-Colo
15	MF	**Carlos Carmona**	21 February 1987 (aged 17)			(Football Federation of Chile) Coquimbo Unido
16	FW	José Soto	28 January 1986 (aged 18)			(Football Federation of Chile) Santiago Wanderers
17	MF	**Carlos Villanueva**	5 February 1986 (aged 18)			(Football Federation of Chile) Audax Italiano
18	DF	**Gonzalo Jara**	29 August 1985 (aged 19)			(Football Federation of Chile) Huachipato
19	MF	**José Pedro Fuenzalida**	22 February 1985 (aged 19)			(Football Federation of Chile) Universidad Católica
20	FW	Ricardo Parada	2 January 1985 (aged 20)			(Football Federation of Chile) Ñublense

(Source for player names:)

== Colombia ==
Coach: Eduardo Lara (Colombia)

No.	Pos.	Player	Date of birth (age)	Caps	Goals	Club
1	GK	**Libis Arenas**	12 May 1987 (aged 18)			(Colombian Football Federation) Envigado
2	DF	**Carlos Valdés**	22 May 1985 (aged 20)			(Colombian Football Federation) Real Cartagena
3	DF	**Cristián Zapata**	30 September 1986 (aged 18)			(Colombian Football Federation) Deportivo Cali
4	DF	Luis Gabriel Castro	28 July 1986 (aged 18)			(Colombian Football Federation) Deportivo Independiente Medellín
5	DF	**Juan Camilo Zúñiga**	14 December 1985 (aged 19)			(Colombian Football Federation) Atlético Nacional
6	MF	Harrison Morales	20 June 1986 (aged 18)			(Colombian Football Federation) Deportes Quindío
7	FW	**Hugo Rodallega**	25 July 1985 (aged 19)			(Colombian Football Federation) Deportes Quindío
8	FW	**Juan Toja**	24 May 1985 (aged 20)			(Colombian Football Federation) Independiente Santa Fé
9	FW	**Radamel Falcao**	10 February 1986 (aged 19)			(Argentine Football Association) River Plate
10	MF	Sebastián Hernández	2 October 1986 (aged 18)			(Colombian Football Federation) Deportes Quindío
11	MF	Harrison Otálvaro	28 June 1986 (aged 18)			(Colombian Football Federation) América de Cali
12	GK	Carlos Abella	25 January 1986 (aged 19)			(Colombian Football Federation) Atlético Nacional
13	MF	**Fredy Guarín**	30 June 1986 (aged 18)			(Colombian Football Federation) Envigado
14	MF	**Abel Aguilar**	6 January 1985 (aged 20)			(Colombian Football Federation) Deportivo Cali
15	FW	**Oscar Briceño**	6 September 1985 (aged 19)			(Colombian Football Federation) Deportes Tolima
16	MF	**Edwin Valencia**	29 March 1985 (aged 20)			(Colombian Football Federation) América de Cali
17	MF	**Christian Marrugo**	18 July 1985 (aged 19)			(Colombian Football Federation) Atlético Nacional
18	FW	**Wason Rentería**	4 July 1985 (aged 19)			(Colombian Football Federation) Boyacá Chicó
19	DF	**Mauricio Casierra**	8 December 1985 (aged 19)			(Colombian Football Federation) Once Caldas
20	FW	**Dayro Moreno**	16 September 1985 (aged 19)			(Colombian Football Federation) Once Caldas

(Source for player names:)

== Ecuador ==
Coach: José Jacinto Vega (Ecuador)

No.	Pos.	Player	Date of birth (age)	Caps	Goals	Club
1	GK	Danny Cabezas	March 4, 1985 (aged 19)			(Ecuadorian Football Federation) El Nacional
2	DF	Marcos Rodriguez	January 1, 1985 (aged 20)			(Ecuadorian Football Federation) Deportivo Quito
3	DF	Colón Grijalva	January 1, 1985 (aged 20)			(Ecuadorian Football Federation) LDU Quito
4	DF	**Gabriel Achilier**	March 24, 1989 (aged 15)			(Ecuadorian Football Federation) L.D.U. Loja
5	MF	**Antonio Valencia**	August 4, 1985 (aged 19)			(Ecuadorian Football Federation) El Nacional
6	MF	Héctor Cortez	January 1, 1985 (aged 20)			(Ecuadorian Football Federation) C.D. ESPOLI
7	MF	**Christian Noboa**	April 9, 1985 (aged 19)			(Ecuadorian Football Federation) Emelec
8	MF	Danny Alvarez Palma	January 14, 1985 (aged 19)			(Ecuadorian Football Federation) Manta F.C.
9	FW	**Joffre Guerrón**	April 28, 1985 (aged 19)			(Ecuadorian Football Federation) Aucas
10	FW	**Luis Bolaños**	March 27, 1985 (aged 19)			(Ecuadorian Football Federation) LDU Quito
11	FW	Mauricio Hurtado	October 22, 1985 (aged 19)			(Ecuadorian Football Federation) Barcelona
12	GK	Luis Domínguez	January 1, 1985 (aged 20)			(Ecuadorian Football Federation) Barcelona
13	DF	Franklin Klinger	January 1, 1985 (aged 20)			(Ecuadorian Football Federation) Deportivo Quito
14	DF	Wilson Mariño	January 1, 1985 (aged 20)			(Ecuadorian Football Federation) Manta F.C.
15	MF	**Pedro Quiñónez**	March 4, 1986 (aged 18)			(Ecuadorian Football Federation) Deportivo Quito
16	DF	Adrian García	January 1, 1985 (aged 20)			(Ecuadorian Football Federation) Delfín S.C.
17	MF	**Edder Vaca**	October 25, 1985 (aged 19)			(Ecuadorian Football Federation) Rocafuerte
18	FW	Efren Mera	June 23, 1985 (aged 19)			(Ecuadorian Football Federation) Manta F.C.
19	FW	Jimmy Arroyo	January 1, 1985 (aged 20)			(Ecuadorian Football Federation) Deportivo Quito
20	MF	**Roberto Ordóñez**	May 4, 1985 (aged 19)			(Ecuadorian Football Federation) C.D. ESPOLI

(Source for player names:)

== Paraguay ==
Head coach: Cristobal Maldonado (Paraguay)

No.	Pos.	Player	Date of birth (age)	Caps	Goals	Club
1	GK	Julio López	18 April 1986 (aged 18)			(Paraguayan Football Association) Trinidense
2	DF	Gregor Aguayo	6 February 1986 (aged 18)			(Paraguayan Football Association) Club Tacuary
3	DF	Angel Alonso	30 November 1985 (aged 19)			(Paraguayan Football Association) Club Libertad
4	DF	**Enrique Gabriel Meza**	28 November 1985 (aged 19)			(Paraguayan Football Association) Club Sol de América
5	DF	César Martínez	26 February 1986 (aged 18)			(Paraguayan Football Association) Luqueño
6	DF	Fernando Ismael Rodríguez	17 January 1986 (aged 18)			(Paraguayan Football Association) Cerro Porteño
7	MF	Rodrigo Cantero	19 July 1985 (aged 19)			(Paraguayan Football Association) Nacional
8	MF	José Guimaraes	1 January 1985 (aged 20)			(Paraguayan Football Association) Club Sol de América
9	FW	Juan Sebastián Ramos	1 January 1985 (aged 20)			(Paraguayan Football Association) Cerro Porteño
10	MF	**Osvaldo Martínez**	8 April 1986 (aged 18)			(Paraguayan Football Association) Club Libertad
11	FW	**Cristian Bogado**	7 January 1987 (aged 18)			(Paraguayan Football Association) Club Sol de América
12	GK	Carlos Servín	24 May 1987 (aged 17)			(Paraguayan Football Association) Club Tacuary
13	DF	Rodrigo Roman	20 June 1986 (aged 18)			(Paraguayan Football Association) Cerro Porteño
14	MF	**José Montiel**	19 March 1988 (aged 16)			(Paraguayan Football Association) Club Olimpia
15	MF	Jorge Gaona	26 January 1985 (aged 19)			(Paraguayan Football Association) Cerro Porteño
16	MF	Germán Segovia	9 June 1988 (aged 16)			(Paraguayan Football Association) Club Olimpia
17	FW	**Javier Acuña**	23 June 1988 (aged 16)			(Royal Spanish Football Federation) Cadiz
18	MF	**Julián Benítez**	6 June 1987 (aged 17)			(Paraguayan Football Association) Guarani
19	FW	Iván González	29 January 1987 (aged 17)			(Paraguayan Football Association) Guarani
20	FW	**Diego Figueredo**	28 April 1985 (aged 19)			(Paraguayan Football Association) Nacional

(Source for player names:)

== Perú ==
Coach: Julio García Ruiz (Peru)

No.	Pos.	Player	Date of birth (age)	Caps	Goals	Club
1	GK	**José Carvallo**	1 March 1986 (aged 18)			(Peruvian Football Federation) Club Universitario de Deportes
2	DF	Renzo Reaños	17 May 1986 (aged 18)			(Peruvian Football Federation) Club Alianza Lima
3	DF	Juan Pablo Farfán	2 February 1985 (aged 19)			(Peruvian Football Federation) Deportivo Municipal
4	DF	**Miguel Cevasco**	27 April 1986 (aged 18)			(Peruvian Football Federation) Club Universitario de Deportes
5	DF	Óscar Ruiz Corrales	7 December 1985 (aged 19)			(Peruvian Football Federation) Sporting Cristal
6	MF	**Junior Viza**	3 April 1985 (aged 19)			(Peruvian Football Federation) Club Alianza Lima
7	DF	Edson Mejía	22 October 1985 (aged 19)			(Peruvian Football Federation) Sporting Cristal
8	MF	**Ronald Quinteros**	28 June 1985 (aged 19)			(Peruvian Football Federation) Club Alianza Lima
9	FW	**Junior Ross**	19 February 1986 (aged 18)			(Peruvian Football Federation) Coronel Bolognesi
10	MF	Jesús Chávez	5 March 1986 (aged 18)			(Peruvian Football Federation) Club Alianza Lima
11	FW	**Juan González-Vigil**	18 February 1985 (aged 19)			(Peruvian Football Federation) Club Alianza Lima
12	GK	**Raúl Fernández**	6 October 1985 (aged 19)			(Peruvian Football Federation) Club Universitario de Deportes
13	DF	**Renzo Revoredo**	11 May 1986 (aged 18)			(Peruvian Football Federation) Sporting Cristal
14	MF	Jorge Erausquin	6 April 1986 (aged 18)			(Peruvian Football Federation) Club Alianza Lima
15	DF	Nelinho Quina	11 May 1987 (aged 17)			(Peruvian Football Federation) Sporting Cristal
16	MF	Eder Villavicencio	22 May 1985 (aged 19)			(Peruvian Football Federation) Club Universitario de Deportes
17	MF	**Jean Tragodara**	16 December 1985 (aged 19)			(Peruvian Football Federation) Club Universitario de Deportes
18	DF	Máximo Osis	8 February 1985 (aged 19)			(Peruvian Football Federation) Club Alianza Lima
19	FW	Juan Portilla	7 November 1986 (aged 18)			(Peruvian Football Federation) Club Alianza Lima
20	DF	Eduardo Uribe	2 September 1985 (aged 19)			(Peruvian Football Federation) Club Alianza Lima

(Source for player names:)

== Uruguay ==
Coach: Gustavo Ferrín (Uruguay)

No.	Pos.	Player	Date of birth (age)	Caps	Goals	Club
1	GK	**Fernando Muslera**	June 16, 1986 (aged 18)			(Uruguayan Football Association) Montevideo Wanderers
12	GK	Lucero Álvarez	February 24, 1985 (aged 19)			(Uruguayan Football Association) Nacional
2	DF	Sergio Rodríguez	January 5, 1985 (aged 20)			(Uruguayan Football Association) Danubio
4	DF	**Diego Godín**	February 16, 1986 (aged 18)			(Uruguayan Football Association) Cerro
15	DF	Miguel Lavié	April 15, 1986 (aged 18)			(Uruguayan Football Association) Peñarol
6	DF	Sebastián Silvera	March 11, 1986 (aged 18)			(Uruguayan Football Association) Deportivo Maldonado
3	DF	Ignacio La Luz	April 19, 1985 (aged 19)			(Uruguayan Football Association) Nacional
20	DF	Martín Rodríguez	February 10, 1985 (aged 19)			(Uruguayan Football Association) River Plate
5	MF	Luis Aguiar	November 17, 1985 (aged 19)			(Uruguayan Football Association) Liverpool
14	MF	**Álvaro Pereira**	November 28, 1985 (aged 19)			(Uruguayan Football Association) Miramar Misiones
8	MF	**Jorge García**	August 19, 1986 (aged 18)			(Uruguayan Football Association) Danubio
18	MF	**Cristian Rodríguez**	September 30, 1985 (aged 19)			(Uruguayan Football Association) Peñarol
13	MF	**Leandro Ezquerra**	June 5, 1986 (aged 18)			(Uruguayan Football Association) River Plate
10	MF	Juan Ángel Albín	July 17, 1986 (aged 18)			(Uruguayan Football Association) Nacional
16	MF	**Jorge Rodríguez**	January 13, 1985 (aged 19)			(Uruguayan Football Association) Racing Club
17	MF	Ribair Rodríguez	October 4, 1987 (aged 17)			(Uruguayan Football Association) Danubio
19	FW	Danilo Peinado	February 15, 1985 (aged 19)			(Uruguayan Football Association) Defensor Sporting
11	FW	Álvaro Navarro	January 28, 1985 (aged 19)			(Uruguayan Football Association) Defensor Sporting
7	FW	**Christian Stuani**	October 12, 1986 (aged 18)			(Uruguayan Football Association) Danubio
9	FW	Matías Alonso	April 16, 1985 (aged 19)			(Uruguayan Football Association) River Plate

(Source for player names:)

== Venezuela ==
Coach: Nelson Carrero (Venezuela)

No.	Pos.	Player	Date of birth (age)	Caps	Goals	Club
1	GK	**Daniel Valdes**	9 May 1985 (aged 19)			(Venezuelan Football Federation) Trujillanos
2	DF	**Raúl González**	28 June 1985 (aged 19)			(Venezuelan Football Federation) Deportivo Italchacao
3	DF	**José Luis Granados**	22 October 1986 (aged 18)			(Venezuelan Football Federation) Trujillanos
4	DF	**Grenddy Perozo**	28 February 1986 (aged 18)			(Venezuelan Football Federation) Italmaracaibo
5	DF	**Jhon Jairo Ospina**	6 June 1986 (aged 18)			(Venezuelan Football Federation) Deportivo Táchira
6	MF	**Luis Manuel Seijas**	23 June 1986 (aged 18)			(Venezuelan Football Federation) Caracas
7	MF	**Alejandro Guerra**	9 July 1985 (aged 19)			(Venezuelan Football Federation) Caracas
8	MF	**Nicolás Fedor**	19 August 1985 (aged 19)			(Royal Spanish Football Federation) Valencia Mestalla
9	FW	**Paul Ramírez**	30 July 1986 (aged 18)			(Italian Football Federation) AC Bellinzona
10	MF	**Ronald Vargas**	2 December 1986 (aged 18)			(Venezuelan Football Federation) Caracas
11	FW	Evert Espinoza	16 February 1986 (aged 18)			(Venezuelan Football Federation) Caracas
12	GK	Miguel Angel Aponte	1 February 1985 (aged 19)			(Venezuelan Football Federation) Carabobo F.C.
13	MF	Giancarlos Di Julio	7 July 1986 (aged 18)			(Italian Football Federation) Gela
14	MF	**Engelbert Pérez**	27 October 1986 (aged 18)			(Venezuelan Football Federation) Trujillanos
15	DF	Marvin Mina	23 June 1986 (aged 18)			(Venezuelan Football Federation) Monagas
16	MF	Mario Bosseti	1 November 1986 (aged 18)			(Venezuelan Football Federation) Estudiantes
17	MF	Elías Leal	11 November 1986 (aged 18)			(Venezuelan Football Federation) Mineros de Guayana
18	DF	Layneker Zafra	23 May 1986 (aged 18)			(Venezuelan Football Federation) Italmaracaibo
19	FW	Alfredo Contreras	16 August 1986 (aged 18)			(Venezuelan Football Federation) El Vigía
20	FW	Diego Cristaldo	1 January 1985 (aged 20)			(Venezuelan Football Federation) Caracas

(Source for player names:)
