= 2003 FIFA U-17 World Championship squads =

International football championship teams

Those marked in bold have now been capped at full International level.

== Group A ==
=== Finland ===
Head coach: (Finland) Jyrki Heliskoski

No.	Pos.	Player	Date of birth (age)	Caps	Club
1	GK	Aapo Kiljunen	24 January 1986 (aged 17)		(Finland) MYPA
2	MF	Marko Tyyskä	28 December 1986 (aged 16)		(Finland) KooTeePee
3	MF	Tommi Vesala	12 January 1986 (aged 17)		(Finland) FC Espoo
4	DF	**Kristian Kojola**	12 September 1986 (aged 16)		(Finland) FC Espoo
5	DF	Erik Westerholm	4 March 1986 (aged 17)		(Finland) TPV
6	DF	Jermu Gustafsson	22 June 1986 (aged 17)		(Finland) VG-62
7	MF	**Kasper Hämäläinen**	8 August 1986 (aged 17)		(Finland) TPS
8	MF	Eetu Muinonen	5 April 1986 (aged 17)		(Finland) MYPA
9	FW	Tomi Petrescu	24 July 1986 (aged 17)		(England) Leicester City
10	MF	Jussi-Pekka Savolainen	25 June 1986 (aged 17)		(Finland) Pallo-Iirot
11	FW	**Jarno Parikka**	21 July 1986 (aged 17)		(Finland) HJK
12	GK	Turo Simolin	18 January 1986 (aged 17)		(Finland) FC Espoo
13	MF	Ümit Menekse	13 February 1986 (aged 17)		(Finland) Klubi-04
14	MF	**Tim Sparv**	20 February 1987 (aged 16)		(England) Southampton
15	DF	Sami Sanevuori	20 February 1986 (aged 17)		(Finland) VG-62
16	MF	**Tuomo Turunen**	30 August 1987 (aged 15)		(Finland) KooTeePee
17	FW	Jami Puustinen	9 January 1987 (aged 16)		(England) Manchester United
18	DF	**Jarkko Hurme**	4 June 1986 (aged 17)		(Finland) OLS
19	FW	Ville-Veikko Savolainen	25 January 1986 (aged 17)		(Finland) FC Lahti
20	GK	Jon Masalin	29 January 1986 (aged 17)		(England) Aston Villa

=== China ===
Head coach: (China) Liu Chunming

No.	Pos.	Player	Date of birth (age)	Caps	Club
1	GK	Tian Xu	15 February 1986 (aged 17)		(China) Tianjin Teda
2	DF	Hao Qiang	17 January 1986 (aged 17)		(China) Beijing Gouan
3	DF	Cai Xi	18 January 1986 (aged 17)		(China) Wuhan Zall FC
4	DF	Lang Zheng	22 July 1986 (aged 17)		(China) Hebei Chine Fortune FC
5	DF	Li Chenghua	27 June 1986 (aged 17)		(China) Tianjin Teda
6	MF	Li Chunyu	9 October 1986 (aged 16)		(China) Shenyang Jinde
7	MF	Li Benjian	5 March 1986 (aged 17)		(China) Guandong
8	MF	**Hao Junmin**	24 March 1987 (aged 16)		(China) Tianjin Teda
9	MF	Wang Yongpo	19 January 1987 (aged 16)		(China) Shandong Luneng
10	FW	Mao Jianqing	8 August 1986 (aged 17)		(China) Shanghai Shenhua
11	FW	Jiang Chen	24 June 1986 (aged 17)		(China) Sichuan
12	FW	Mao Biao	24 July 1987 (aged 16)		(China) Tianjin Teda
13	DF	Guo Mingyue	7 March 1986 (aged 17)		(China) Shandong Luneng
14	MF	Xu Wen	13 April 1986 (aged 17)		(China) Shanghai Shenhua
15	DF	Liu Qing	5 April 1986 (aged 17)		(China) Shandong Luneng
16	DF	Xu Qun	22 January 1986 (aged 17)		(China) Shandong Luneng
17	MF	Bai Long	13 June 1986 (aged 17)		(China) Jiansu Shuntian
18	FW	Jiang Ning	1 September 1986 (aged 16)		(China) Qingdao Yizhong
19	GK	Lai Li	8 September 1986 (aged 16)		(China) Sichuan
20	GK	Ou Ya	14 February 1986 (aged 17)		(China) Hebei Chine Fortune FC

=== Mexico ===
Head coach: (Argentina) Humberto Grondona

No.	Pos.	Player	Date of birth (age)	Caps	Club
1	GK	José Alamo	16 August 1986 (aged 16)		(Mexico) Necaxa
2	DF	David Cavazos	7 January 1986 (aged 17)		(Mexico) TIGRES UANL
3	DF	Óscar Herrera	16 January 1986 (aged 17)		(Mexico) Necaxa
4	DF	Luis Robles	22 September 1986 (aged 16)		(Mexico) Atlas
5	MF	Alberto Ramírez	2 February 1986 (aged 17)		(Mexico) Tecos UAG
6	DF	David Sánchez	7 July 1986 (aged 17)		(Mexico) Veracruz
7	MF	Samuel Herrera	24 April 1986 (aged 17)		(Mexico) Atlas
8	MF	Diego Estanislao	12 March 1986 (aged 17)		(Mexico) America
9	FW	Rafael Murguía	16 February 1986 (aged 17)		(Mexico) Atlas
10	MF	Julio Ceja	2 June 1986 (aged 17)		(Mexico) Cruz Azul
11	MF	Emilio López	10 May 1986 (aged 17)		(Mexico) Guadalajara
12	GK	**Jonathan Orozco**	12 May 1986 (aged 17)		(Mexico) Monterrey Club de Futbol
13	DF	Manuel Mariaca	4 January 1986 (aged 17)		(Mexico) Club Azul
14	DF	Diego Jiménez	7 April 1986 (aged 17)		(Mexico) Tecos UAG
15	MF	Vicente González	3 March 1986 (aged 17)		(Mexico) Atlas
16	FW	Pedro Osorio	3 April 1986 (aged 17)		(Mexico) Monarcas Morelia
17	MF	**Gerardo Flores**	5 February 1986 (aged 17)		(Mexico) Atlas
18	FW	José De Santiago	28 November 1986 (aged 16)		(Mexico) Tigres UANL
19	DF	Willy Guerrero	31 May 1986 (aged 17)		(Mexico) Pachuca Club de Futbol
20	GK	Óscar González	9 August 1986 (aged 17)		(Mexico) Tigres UANL

=== Colombia ===
Head coach: (Colombia) Eduardo Lara

No.	Pos.	Player	Date of birth (age)	Caps	Club
1	GK	Libis Arenas	12 May 1987 (aged 16)		(Colombia) Envigado FC
2	DF	Jimmy Estacio	8 January 1986 (aged 17)		(Colombia) Deportivo Cali
3	DF	**Cristián Zapata**	30 September 1986 (aged 16)		(Colombia) Deporivo Cali
4	DF	Victor Vargas	3 April 1986 (aged 17)		(Colombia) Atletico Junior Barranquilla
5	DF	Juan Carlos Morales	17 February 1986 (aged 17)		(Colombia) Deportivo Independiente Medellin
6	DF	Harrison Morales	20 June 1986 (aged 17)		(Colombia) Boca Juniors de Cali
7	DF	**Pablo Armero**	2 November 1986 (aged 16)		(Colombia) America de Cali
8	MF	Anthony David Tapia	16 January 1987 (aged 16)		(Colombia) Deportivo Cali
9	FW	Juan Gilberto Núñez	25 March 1986 (aged 17)		(Colombia) Boca Juniors de Cali
10	MF	Sebastián Hernández	2 October 1986 (aged 16)		(Mexico) Atlas
11	MF	Harrison Otálvaro	28 February 1986 (aged 17)		(Colombia) America de Cali
12	GK	Carlos Andres Abella	25 January 1986 (aged 17)		(Colombia) Atletico Nacional
13	MF	**Fredy Guarín**	30 June 1986 (aged 17)		(Colombia) Atletico Huila
14	MF	Alberto Bolívar	22 October 1986 (aged 16)		(Colombia) Envigado FC
15	FW	Carlos Daniel Hidalgo	25 April 1986 (aged 17)		(Colombia) Deportivo Pasto
16	FW	**Adrián Ramos**	22 January 1986 (aged 17)		(Colombia) America de Cali
17	DF	Victor Palacio	28 February 1986 (aged 17)		(Colombia) Atletico Junior de Barranquilla
18	MF	Edwin Móvil	7 May 1986 (aged 17)		(Colombia) Once Caldas
19	DF	Mario Vasquez	14 July 1986 (aged 17)		(Colombia) Independiente Medellin
20	MF	Mario Gómez	6 March 1986 (aged 17)		(Colombia) Independiente Santa Fe

== Group B ==
=== Argentina ===
Head coach: (Argentina) Hugo Tocalli

No.	Pos.	Player	Date of birth (age)	Caps	Club
1	GK	**Óscar Ustari**	3 July 1986 (aged 17)		(Argentina) Independiente
2	DF	**Ezequiel Garay**	10 October 1986 (aged 16)		(Argentina) Newell's Old Boys
3	DF	Lucas Sánchez	30 July 1986 (aged 17)		(Argentina) Talleres de Córdoba
4	DF	Pablo Alvarado	27 February 1986 (aged 17)		(Argentina) San Lorenzo
5	MF	**Lucas Biglia**	30 January 1986 (aged 17)		(Argentina) Argentinos Juniors
6	DF	Lautaro Formica	27 January 1986 (aged 17)		(Argentina) Newell's Old Boys
7	MF	**Neri Cardozo**	8 August 1986 (aged 17)		(Argentina) Boca Juniors
8	MF	Leandro Díaz	26 June 1986 (aged 17)		(Argentina) Boca Juniors
9	FW	Ariel Cólzera	15 April 1986 (aged 17)		(Argentina) Boca Juniors
10	MF	Mariano Hassell	14 February 1986 (aged 17)		(Argentina) San Lorenzo
11	FW	Diego Lagos	5 March 1986 (aged 17)		(Argentina) Lanús
12	GK	Mariano Arnulfo	2 March 1986 (aged 17)		(Argentina) Boca Juniors
13	MF	**Walter Acevedo**	16 February 1986 (aged 17)		(Argentina) San Lorenzo
14	DF	Lucas D'Alegre	27 March 1986 (aged 17)		(Argentina) Boca Juniors
15	DF	Matías Cahais	24 December 1987 (aged 15)		(Argentina) Boca Juniors
16	MF	Alejandro Faurlín	9 August 1986 (aged 17)		(Argentina) Rosario Central
17	FW	Hernán Peirone	28 May 1986 (aged 17)		(Argentina) San Lorenzo
18	FW	Gonzalo Ludueña	12 March 1986 (aged 17)		(Argentina) River Plate
19	MF	**Fernando Gago**	10 April 1986 (aged 17)		(Argentina) Boca Juniors
20	GK	**Nahuel Guzmán**	10 February 1986 (aged 17)		(Argentina) Newell's Old Boys

=== Australia ===
Head coach: (Australia) Ange Postecoglou

No.	Pos.	Player	Date of birth (age)	Caps	Club
1	GK	Nick Crossley	12 September 1987 (aged 15)		(Australia) South Australian Sports Institute
2	DF	Ben Griffin	7 March 1986 (aged 17)		(Australia) Queensland Academy Of Sport
3	MF	Lachlan Cahill	1 March 1986 (aged 17)		(Australia) Olympic Sharks
4	DF	Nigel Boogaard	14 August 1986 (aged 16)		(Australia) Newcastle United
5	DF	Keegan Wolfenden	4 April 1986 (aged 17)		(Australia) Australian Institute Of Sport
6	DF	Jacob Timpano	3 January 1986 (aged 17)		(Australia) Wollongong Wolves
7	MF	**Kristian Sarkies**	25 October 1986 (aged 16)		(Australia) Victorian Institute Of Sport
8	MF	**Erik Paartalu**	3 May 1986 (aged 17)		(Australia) Parramatta Power SC
9	FW	Dezmon Giraldi	24 March 1986 (aged 17)		(Australia) Australian Institute of Sport
10	FW	Serkan Öksüz	16 June 1986 (aged 17)		(Australia) Melbourne Knights
11	FW	Adam Casey	1 May 1986 (aged 17)		(Australia) Australian Institute of Sport
12	GK	Mario Aparicio	13 February 1986 (aged 17)		(Australia) Queensland Academy Of Sport
13	MF	Matt Christensen	8 June 1986 (aged 17)		(England) Southampton
14	FW	Richard Cardozo	28 March 1986 (aged 17)		(Australia) Parramatta Power SC
15	DF	**Adrian Leijer**	25 March 1986 (aged 17)		(Australia) Victorian Institute Of Sport
16	MF	Dane Richardson	24 July 1986 (aged 17)		(Australia) Queensland Academy Of Sport
17	FW	Matt Hilton	27 February 1986 (aged 17)		(Australia) Olympic Sharks
18	FW	Matthew Deegan	4 February 1986 (aged 17)		(Australia) Australian Institute Of Sport
19	MF	Angelo Martino	12 January 1986 (aged 17)		(Australia) Parramatta Power SC
20	GK	Nathan Hughes	10 September 1986 (aged 16)		(Australia) Northern Spirit SC

=== Costa Rica ===
Head coach: (Costa Rica) Gerardo Manuel Ureña

No.	Pos.	Player	Date of birth (age)	Caps	Club
1	GK	**Daniel Cambronero**	8 January 1986 (aged 17)		(Costa Rica) Deportivo Saprissa
2	DF	Elder Díaz	26 July 1986 (aged 17)		(Costa Rica) Deportivo Saprissa
3	DF	Daniel Arce	17 February 1986 (aged 17)		(Costa Rica) Deportivo Saprissa
4	DF	Eric Mauricio Sánchez	23 April 1986 (aged 17)		(Costa Rica) Club Deportivo Saprissa
5	DF	**Ariel Rodríguez**	22 April 1986 (aged 17)		(Costa Rica) Liga Deportiva Alajuelense
6	MF	Crisanto Esquivel	1 January 1986 (aged 17)		(Costa Rica) AD Cariari de Pococi
7	MF	**Yosimar Arias**	24 September 1986 (aged 16)		(Costa Rica) Liga Deportivo Alajuelense
8	MF	Wálter Chévez	6 May 1986 (aged 17)		(Costa Rica) Sport Heridiano
9	FW	Gherland McDonald	6 September 1986 (aged 16)		(Costa Rica) Proyecto Morera Soto
10	MF	Jorge Chávez	15 June 1986 (aged 17)		(Costa Rica) Proyecto Morera Soto
11	DF	Pablo Rodríguez	1 March 1986 (aged 17)		(Costa Rica) Deportivo Saprissa
12	DF	Kenny Mitchel	6 September 1986 (aged 16)		(Costa Rica) Deportivo Saprissa
13	GK	José Jiménez	12 January 1987 (aged 16)		(Costa Rica) Municipal Liberia
14	DF	Roberto Flores	15 January 1987 (aged 16)		(Spain) Valencia CF
15	FW	Delio Alonso Salazar	21 May 1986 (aged 17)		(Costa Rica) No club Affiliation
16	DF	Jorge Quiros	7 May 1986 (aged 17)		(Costa Rica) Deportivo Saprissa
17	FW	José Delgado	13 February 1986 (aged 17)		(Costa Rica) Deportivo Saprissa
18	GK	**Keylor Navas**	15 December 1986 (aged 16)		(Costa Rica) Deportivo Saprissa
19	MF	Óscar Madriz	17 January 1986 (aged 17)		(Costa Rica) Liga Deportiva Alajuelense
20	MF	José Garro	7 June 1986 (aged 17)		(Costa Rica) Sport Herediano

=== Nigeria ===
Head coach: (Nigeria) Augustine Eguavoen

No.	Pos.	Player	Date of birth (age)	Caps	Club
1	GK	Ambruse Vanzekin	14 July 1986 (aged 17)		(Nigeria) Grays International FC
2	DF	Efe Unukpo	12 May 1987 (aged 16)		(Nigeria) Bendel Utd
3	DF	Awwalu Aminu	2 January 1986 (aged 17)		(Nigeria) Young Africans
4	DF	Omoh Attah	17 February 1986 (aged 17)		(Nigeria) Plateau Utd
5	DF	Nkem Ovunwo	7 July 1986 (aged 17)		(Nigeria) Diamond Utd
6	DF	Echezona Anyichie	14 May 1990 (aged 13)		(France) Racine Du Nord
7	FW	**Emmanuel Sarki**	26 December 1987 (aged 15)		(Nigeria) Grays International FC
8	FW	Ezekiel Bala	8 April 1987 (aged 16)		(Nigeria) Raiders
9	FW	**Isaac Promise**	2 December 1987 (aged 15)		(Nigeria) Grays International FC
10	MF	**Mikel John Obi**	22 April 1987 (aged 16)		(Nigeria) Plateau Utd
11	FW	**Chinedu Obasi**	1 June 1986 (aged 17)		(Nigeria) Shell
12	GK	Mustapha Salihu	1 December 1987 (aged 15)		(Nigeria) Sunshine Stars FC
13	FW	**Solomon Okoronkwo**	2 March 1987 (aged 16)		(Nigeria) Shell
14	MF	Kola Anubi	24 March 1987 (aged 16)		(Nigeria) Ysfon Academy
15	DF	Chamberlain Ekrebe	31 December 1987 (aged 15)		(Nigeria) Haosa
16	FW	Chijioke Ebigbo	22 June 1987 (aged 16)		(France) Racine Du Nord
17	DF	Charles Amaihwe	1 March 1987 (aged 16)		(Nigeria) St. Thomas
18	DF	Morufu Adetoro	13 November 1986 (aged 16)		(Nigeria) Brights Stars
19	MF	John Egharevba	23 October 1988 (aged 14)		(Nigeria) Haosa
20	GK	Tope Okeowo	20 December 1988 (aged 14)		(Nigeria) Trinity

== Group C ==
=== Yemen ===
Head coach: (Yemen) Amen Al-Sunaini

No.	Pos.	Player	Date of birth (age)	Caps	Club
1	GK	**Mohammed Ayash**	6 March 1986 (aged 17)		(Yemen) Al Hilal Hudaya
2	MF	Mohammed Alwah	15 March 1986 (aged 17)		(Yemen) Al Shaab Ibb
3	DF	Abdullah Al-Safi	26 February 1986 (aged 17)		(Yemen) Al Hilal Hudaya
4	DF	Yaser Al-Badani	2 February 1986 (aged 17)		(Yemen) Al Shaab Ibb
5	DF	Ali Al-Baiti	17 March 1986 (aged 17)		(Yemen) Hassan Abyan
6	FW	**Sami Juaim**	3 May 1986 (aged 17)		(Yemen) Al Ahli Sanaa
7	MF	Fuad Al-Ammari	13 February 1986 (aged 17)		(Yemen) Al Ahli Sanaa
8	MF	**Khaled Baleid**	2 November 1986 (aged 16)		(Yemen) Al Tilal Aden
9	MF	Galal Al-Qatta	16 June 1986 (aged 17)		(Yemen) May 22 Sanaa
10	MF	**Akram Al-Selwi**	8 September 1986 (aged 16)		(Yemen) Al Yarmouk Sanaa
11	FW	Ebrahim Saleh	26 June 1986 (aged 17)		(Yemen) Al Ahli Sanaa
12	DF	Hemyar Al-Mesri	7 January 1986 (aged 17)		(Yemen) May 22 Sanaa
13	GK	Halim Al-Jabali	13 February 1986 (aged 17)		(Yemen) Hassan Abyan
14	DF	Wasim Al-Qor	22 February 1986 (aged 17)		(Yemen) Hassan Abyan
15	MF	**Akram Al-Worafi**	12 November 1986 (aged 16)		(Yemen) Al Shaab Ibb
16	FW	**Abdulelah Sharyan**	11 January 1986 (aged 17)		(Yemen) May 22 Sanaa
17	DF	Esmat Al-Khtshi	9 April 1986 (aged 17)		(Yemen) Al Tilal Aden
18	GK	**Anwar Al-Aug**	5 February 1986 (aged 17)		(Saudi Arabia) Al Ittihad
19	DF	Mohanad Munassar	15 March 1986 (aged 17)		(Yemen) Al Hilal Hudaya
20	MF	**Abdo Al-Edresi**	16 February 1986 (aged 17)		(Yemen) Al Shaab Sanaa

=== Portugal ===
Head coach: (Portugal) Antonio Violante

No.	Pos.	Player	Date of birth (age)	Caps	Club
1	GK	Pedro Freitas	31 August 1986 (aged 16)		(Portugal) Vitória de Guimarães
2	DF	João Dias	23 December 1986 (aged 16)		(Portugal) Porto
3	DF	**Tiago Gomes**	29 July 1986 (aged 17)		(Portugal) Benfica
4	DF	**Miguel Veloso**	11 May 1986 (aged 17)		(Portugal) Sporting CP
5	DF	Tiago Costa	27 October 1986 (aged 16)		(Portugal) Porto
6	MF	**Paulo Machado**	31 March 1986 (aged 17)		(Portugal) Porto
7	FW	**Vieirinha**	24 January 1986 (aged 17)		(Portugal) Porto
8	MF	**João Moutinho**	8 September 1986 (aged 16)		(Portugal) Sporting CP
9	FW	Carlos Saleiro	25 February 1986 (aged 17)		(Portugal) Sporting CP
10	MF	Márcio Sousa	23 March 1986 (aged 17)		(Portugal) Porto
11	FW	**Hélder Barbosa**	26 May 1987 (aged 16)		(Portugal) Porto
12	GK	Mário Felgueiras	12 December 1986 (aged 16)		(Portugal) Sporting CP
13	MF	Vítor Vinha	11 November 1986 (aged 16)		(Portugal) Académica de Coimbra
14	DF	Paulo Ricardo	3 March 1986 (aged 17)		(Portugal) Vitória de Guimarães
15	FW	João Pedro	4 May 1986 (aged 17)		(Portugal) Braga
16	MF	Bruno Gama	15 November 1987 (aged 15)		(Portugal) Braga
17	MF	João Coimbra	24 May 1986 (aged 17)		(Portugal) Benfica
18	MF	Manuel Curto	9 July 1986 (aged 17)		(Portugal) Benfica
19	MF	**Manuel Fernandes**	5 February 1986 (aged 17)		(Portugal) Benfica
20	GK	**Hugo Marques**	15 January 1986 (aged 17)		(Portugal) Porto

=== Cameroon ===
Head coach: (Cameroon) Anatole Abee

No.	Pos.	Player	Date of birth (age)	Caps	Club
1	GK	Oumarou Idrissou	18 March 1986 (aged 17)		(Cameroon) Sahel Maroua FC
2	DF	Jackson Eyinga	4 February 1987 (aged 16)		(Cameroon) Cintra Yaounde
3	DF	Henri Namalui	27 October 1986 (aged 16)		(Cameroon) Pyramide Mfou
4	DF	Guy Bondoa	2 January 1987 (aged 16)		(Cameroon) College Vogt
5	DF	**Dany Nounkeu**	11 April 1986 (aged 17)		(Cameroon) College Vogt
6	DF	Armand Ebanda	30 April 1987 (aged 16)		(Cameroon) Sahel Maroua FC
7	MF	**Alex Song**	9 September 1987 (aged 15)		(France) SC Bastia
8	MF	**Landry N'Guémo**	28 November 1986 (aged 16)		(Cameroon) Semences Yaounde
9	FW	Serge N'Gal	13 January 1986 (aged 17)		(France) Pau FC
10	MF	Gilbert Momo	14 February 1986 (aged 17)		(Cameroon) Canon Yaounde
11	MF	**Stéphane Mbia**	20 May 1986 (aged 17)		(Cameroon) KSA Douala
12	DF	Eugene Mbome	29 August 1986 (aged 16)		(Cameroon) Fenerbashe Yaounde
13	MF	**Patrick Mevoungou**	15 February 1986 (aged 17)		(Cameroon) Semences Yaounde
14	FW	Jean Mbouemboue	11 November 1986 (aged 16)		(Cameroon) Cotton Sport Garoua
15	FW	Joseph Mawaye	14 May 1986 (aged 17)		(Cameroon) Dreams Douala
16	GK	Luc Kalapach	11 March 1986 (aged 17)		(Cameroon) Racing Bafoussam FC
17	DF	Antonio Ghomsi	22 April 1986 (aged 17)		(Italy) Genoa
18	MF	Cedrick Deumaga	30 January 1986 (aged 17)		(Cameroon) Social Yaounde
19	FW	Atancho Giles	13 September 1986 (aged 16)		(Cameroon) Cintra Yaounde
20	FW	Barnabé Atangana	4 June 1987 (aged 16)		(Cameroon) Diamant Yaounde
21	DF	Didier Kouakam	5 July 1986 (aged 17)		(Cameroon) Espoir Yaounde

=== Brazil ===
Head coach: (Brazil) Marcos Paquetá

No.	Pos.	Player	Date of birth (age)	Caps	Club
1	GK	Bruno Landgraf	1 May 1986 (aged 17)		(Brazil) São Paulo
2	DF	Léo Matos	2 April 1986 (aged 17)		(Brazil) Flamengo
3	DF	João Guilherme	21 April 1986 (aged 17)		(Brazil) Internacional
4	DF	Leonardo Moura	19 March 1986 (aged 17)		(Brazil) Santos
5	MF	Júnior	28 February 1986 (aged 17)		(Brazil) Vasco da Gama
6	DF	Sandro	19 March 1986 (aged 17)		(Brazil) Vitoria
7	MF	Jonathan	27 February 1986 (aged 17)		(Brazil) Cruzeiro
8	MF	**Arouca**	11 August 1986 (aged 17)		(Brazil) Fluminense
9	FW	Thyago	5 January 1986 (aged 17)		(Brazil) Corinthians
10	MF	**Ederson**	13 January 1986 (aged 17)		(Brazil) RS Futebol Clube
11	FW	Evandro Roncatto	24 May 1986 (aged 17)		(Brazil) Guarani
12	GK	Marcelo Lomba	18 December 1986 (aged 16)		(Brazil) Flamengo
13	DF	Marlon	21 November 1986 (aged 16)		(Brazil) Flamengo
14	MF	Arthur	25 May 1986 (aged 17)		(Brazil) São Paulo
15	MF	Felipe	11 January 1986 (aged 17)		(Brazil) Flamengo
16	MF	Juliano Mineiro	14 February 1986 (aged 17)		(Brazil) Fluminense
17	DF	Ronny	11 May 1986 (aged 17)		(Brazil) Corinthians
18	FW	Abuda	28 March 1986 (aged 17)		(Brazil) Corinthians
19	FW	Hugo	6 January 1986 (aged 17)		(Brazil) Botafogo
20	GK	Walisson	13 February 1986 (aged 17)		(Brazil) Guarani

== Group D ==
=== South Korea ===
Head coach: (South Korea) Yoon Deok-yeo

No.	Pos.	Player	Date of birth (age)	Caps	Club
1	GK	Cha Gi-suk	26 December 1986 (aged 16)		(South Korea) Seoul Physical Education High School
2	MF	Kim Jung-hoon	15 May 1986 (aged 17)		(Japan) Gamba Osaka
3	DF	Hwang Kyu-hwan	18 June 1986 (aged 17)		(South Korea) Dongbuk High School
4	DF	Kang Jin-wook	13 February 1986 (aged 17)		(France) FC Metz
5	DF	**Jung In-whan**	15 December 1986 (aged 16)		(South Korea) Yongin Football Center
6	MF	Lee Sang-hup	3 August 1986 (aged 17)		(South Korea) Dongbuk High School
7	DF	Baek Seung-min	12 March 1986 (aged 17)		(South Korea) Yongin Football Center
8	DF	Shin Young-chol	14 March 1986 (aged 17)		(South Korea) Pungsaeng High School
9	FW	**Yang Dong-hyen**	28 March 1986 (aged 17)		(Spain) Real Valladolid
10	FW	Han Dong-won	6 April 1986 (aged 17)		(South Korea) Anyang LG Cheetahs
11	MF	**Lee Yong-rae**	17 April 1986 (aged 17)		(South Korea) Yuseong Bio Science Technology High School
12	DF	Lee Sang-yong	9 January 1986 (aged 17)		(South Korea) Pungsaeng High School
13	GK	Han Il-koo	18 February 1987 (aged 16)		(South Korea) Pohang Jecheol Technical High School
14	MF	Kim Jun	9 December 1986 (aged 16)		(South Korea) Suwon Samsung Bluewings
15	FW	Lee Hun	29 April 1986 (aged 17)		(South Korea) Sudo Electric Technical High School
16	MF	Ahn Sang-hyun	5 March 1986 (aged 17)		(South Korea) Anyang LG Cheetahs
17	FW	Ou Kyoung-jun	10 December 1987 (aged 15)		(France) FC Metz
18	GK	Kim Dae-ho	15 April 1986 (aged 17)		(South Korea) Kyunghee High School
19	FW	**Shin Young-rok**	27 March 1987 (aged 16)		(South Korea) Suwon Samsung Bluewings
20	DF	**Lee Gang-jin**	25 April 1986 (aged 17)		(South Korea) Suwon Samsung Bluewings

=== United States ===
Head coach: (United States) John Ellinger

No.	Pos.	Player	Date of birth (age)	Caps	Club
1	GK	Phil Marfuggi	15 January 1986 (aged 17)		(United States) PDA United
2	DF	Kyle Helton	20 May 1986 (aged 17)		(United States) Atlanta Fire
3	DF	**Jonathan Spector**	1 March 1986 (aged 17)		(England) Manchester United
4	MF	**Eddie Gaven**	25 October 1986 (aged 16)		(United States) MetroStars
5	DF	Dwight Owens	23 January 1986 (aged 17)		(United States) La Jolla Nomads
6	DF	Chris Germani	10 July 1987 (aged 15)		(United States) Delco
7	MF	Brian Grazier	17 March 1986 (aged 17)		(United States) Metro
8	MF	John DiRaimondo	23 April 1986 (aged 17)		(United States) Busch
9	FW	Michael Harrington	24 January 1986 (aged 17)		(United States) CASL Elite
10	MF	Guillermo González	4 January 1986 (aged 17)		(United States) Los Angeles Galaxy
11	MF	**Freddy Adu**	2 June 1989 (aged 14)		(United States) Bethesda International
12	DF	Steven Curfman	8 October 1986 (aged 16)		(United States) CASL Elite
13	FW	Jamie Watson	10 April 1986 (aged 17)		(United States) Dallas Comets
14	DF	Julian Valentin	23 February 1987 (aged 16)		(United States) Delco
15	MF	Corey Ashe	14 March 1986 (aged 17)		(United States) Beach Impact
16	DF	Adrian Chevannes	17 June 1986 (aged 17)		(United States) Club Dallas
17	MF	**Danny Szetela**	17 June 1987 (aged 16)		(United States) World Class Olympic
18	GK	Quentin Westberg	25 April 1986 (aged 17)		(France) Espérance Sportive Troyes
19	FW	Jacob Peterson	27 January 1986 (aged 17)		(United States) Michigan Wolves
20	GK	Stephen Sandbo	23 February 1987 (aged 16)		(United States) Ohio Thunder

=== Spain ===
Head coach: (Spain) Juan Santisteban

No.	Pos.	Player	Date of birth (age)	Caps	Club
1	GK	Antonio Adán	13 May 1987 (aged 16)		(Spain) Real Madrid
2	DF	Manuel Ruz	5 April 1986 (aged 17)		(Spain) Valencia
3	DF	Raúl Llorente	2 April 1986 (aged 17)		(Spain) Atlético Madrid
4	DF	Paco Borrego	6 June 1986 (aged 17)		(Spain) Barcelona
5	DF	Sergio Sánchez	3 April 1986 (aged 17)		(Spain) Espanyol
6	MF	Marcos Tébar	7 February 1986 (aged 17)		(Spain) Real Madrid
7	MF	Sisi	22 April 1986 (aged 17)		(Spain) Valencia
8	MF	Markel Bergara	5 May 1986 (aged 17)		(Spain) Real Sociedad
9	FW	David Rodríguez	14 February 1986 (aged 17)		(Spain) Atlético Madrid
10	MF	**David Silva**	8 January 1986 (aged 17)		(Spain) Valencia
11	MF	José Manuel Jurado	29 June 1986 (aged 17)		(Spain) Real Madrid
12	MF	Miguel Pallardó	5 September 1986 (aged 16)		(Spain) Valencia
13	GK	Iván García	14 January 1986 (aged 17)		(Spain) Avilés
14	DF	César Arzo	21 January 1986 (aged 17)		(Spain) Villarreal
15	MF	**Javi García**	8 February 1987 (aged 16)		(Spain) Real Madrid
16	FW	Xisco Nadal	27 June 1986 (aged 17)		(Spain) Villarreal
17	MF	**Cesc Fàbregas**	4 May 1987 (aged 16)		(Spain) Barcelona
18	FW	Oskitz Estefanía	12 October 1986 (aged 16)		(Spain) Real Sociedad
19	FW	José María Cases	23 November 1986 (aged 16)		(Spain) Villarreal
20	GK	Javier Mandaluniz	15 January 1987 (aged 16)		(Spain) Athletic

=== Sierra Leone ===
Head coach: (Sierra Leone) Musa Kallon

No.	Pos.	Player	Date of birth (age)	Caps	Club
1	GK	**Patrick Bantamoi**	24 May 1986 (aged 17)		(The Gambia) Gamtel
2	DF	Daniel Taylor	4 December 1987 (aged 15)		(Sierra Leone) Mighty Blackpool
3	DF	**Umaru Bangura**	7 October 1987 (aged 15)		(Sierra Leone) Mighty Blackpool
4	DF	Mohamed Koroma	11 June 1988 (aged 15)		(Sierra Leone) St.Edwards
5	DF	**Hassan Sesay**	22 October 1987 (aged 15)		(Sierra Leone) East End Lions
6	DF	**Medo Kamara**	16 November 1987 (aged 15)		(Sierra Leone) Brookfields United
7	DF	**Mohamed Fornah**	20 November 1987 (aged 15)		(Sierra Leone) East End Lions
8	MF	**Alimamy Sesay**	24 April 1987 (aged 16)		(Sierra Leone) Kallon FC
9	MF	Sampha Kamara	20 October 1988 (aged 14)		(Sierra Leone) Municipal
10	MF	**Samuel Barlay**	15 September 1986 (aged 16)		(Sierra Leone) East End Lions
11	FW	**Obi Metzger**	19 September 1987 (aged 15)		(Sierra Leone) Ports Authority
12	GK	Ibrahim Bangura	10 October 1987 (aged 15)		(Sierra Leone) Mighty Blackpool
13	FW	Emerson Samba	5 May 1987 (aged 16)		(Sierra Leone) Mighty Blackpool
14	MF	Lansana Bayoh	9 February 1987 (aged 16)		(Sierra Leone) Kamboi Eagles
15	FW	**John Keister**	1 January 1988 (aged 15)		(Sierra Leone) Giants FC
16	FW	Ibrahim Tahini	25 July 1987 (aged 16)		(Sierra Leone) Kallon FC
17	DF	Abu Bakarr Sankoh	23 June 1987 (aged 16)		(Sierra Leone) Real Republicans
18	MF	Kalie Jalloh	28 September 1987 (aged 15)		(Sierra Leone) St.Edwards
19	FW	**Sheriff Suma**	12 October 1986 (aged 16)		(Sierra Leone) Kallon FC
20	GK	Unisa Bangura	23 July 1987 (aged 16)		(Sierra Leone) Real Republicans
