= 2005 South American U-20 Championship =

2005 Sudamericano Sub-20

Tournament details
- Host country: Colombia
- Dates: 13 January – 6 February
- Teams: 10 (from 1 confederation)
- Venue: 3 (in 3 host cities)

Final positions
- Champions: Colombia (2nd title)
- Runners-up: Brazil
- Third place: Argentina
- Fourth place: Chile

Tournament statistics
- Matches played: 35
- Goals scored: 114 (3.26 per match)
- Top scorer: (Colombia) Hugo Rodallega (11 goals)

The 2005 South American Youth Championship (Sudamericana sub-20) was a football competition contested by all ten U-20 national football teams of CONMEBOL. The tournament was held in Colombia between 13 January and 6 February 2005, it was the 22nd time the competition has been held and the third to take place in Colombia. Colombia finished undefeated, winning their second trophy.

== Format ==
The teams are separated in two groups of five, and each team plays four matches in a pure round-robin stage. The three top competitors advance to a single final group of six, wherein each team plays five matches. The top four teams in the final group qualify to the 2005 FIFA World Youth Championship

== Squads ==
For a list of all the squads in the final tournament, see 2005 South American U-20 Championship squads.

The following teams entered the tournament:

- Argentina
- Bolivia
- Brazil
- Chile
- Colombia (host)
- Ecuador
- Peru
- Paraguay
- Uruguay
- Venezuela

== First group stage ==
=== Group A ===
Team	Pts	Pld	W	D	L	GF	GA
Argentina	10	4	3	1	0	14	1
Colombia	10	4	3	1	0	9	1
Venezuela	4	4	1	1	2	6	8
Bolivia	2	4	0	2	2	4	13
Peru	1	4	0	1	3	1	11

==== Results ====
13 January 2005
17:50

Argentina	3–0	Venezuela
González 32' (o.g.); Messi 71'; Barrientos 82'

Estadio Centenario, Armenia
Referee: Héber Lopes (Brazil)
13 January 2005
20:30

Colombia	5–0	Bolivia
Toja 8'; Rodallega 47', 83' (pen.), 86', 88'

Estadio Centenario, Armenia
Referee: Pablo Pozo (Chile)

15 January 2005
17:50

Argentina	4–0	Bolivia
Barrientos 3'; Messi 50', 59'; Boselli 80'

Estadio Palogrande, Manizales
Referee: Mauricio Reinoso (Ecuador)
15 January 2005
20:00

Colombia	1–0	Peru
Rodallega 38'

Estadio Palogrande, Manizales
Referee: Ricardo Grance (Paraguay)

17 January 2005
18:00

Bolivia	3–3	Venezuela
Fierro 30'; Sossa 45', 69'		Ramírez 42' (pen.), 59', 84' (pen.)

Estadio Palogrande, Manizales
Referee: Ricardo Grance (Paraguay)
17 January 2005
20:10

Argentina	6–0	Peru
Torres 5', 13'; Barrientos 31'; Abraham 35'; Messi 43'; Sosa 79'

Estadio Palogrande, Manizales
Referee: Martín Vázquez (Uruguay)

19 January 2005
17:50

Peru	1–1	Bolivia
González 13'		Saucedo 27'

Estadio Hernán Ramírez Villegas, Pereira, Colombia
Referee: Héber Lopes (Brazil)
19 January 2005
20:00

Colombia	2–0	Venezuela
Rodallega 7'; Briceño 79'

Estadio Hernán Ramírez Villegas, Pereira, Colombia
Referee: Martín Vázquez (Uruguay)

21 January 2005
18:20

Argentina	1–1	Colombia
Peirone 52'		Falcao 28'

Estadio Palogrande, Manizales
Referee: Mauricio Reinoso (Ecuador)
21 January 2005
20:30

Peru	0–3	Venezuela
		Miku 7', 82'; Pérez 74'

Estadio Palogrande, Manizales
Referee: Pablo Pozo (Chile)

=== Group B ===
Team	Pts	Pld	W	D	L	GF	GA
Brazil	8	4	2	2	0	10	3
Chile	7	4	2	1	1	10	7
Uruguay	6	4	1	3	0	6	0
Paraguay	5	4	1	2	1	7	6
Ecuador	0	4	0	0	4	3	20

==== Results ====
14 January 2005
17:20

Uruguay	0–0	Paraguay

Estadio Hernán Ramírez Villegas, Pereira, Colombia
Referee: Gabriel Brazenas (Argentina)
14 January 2005
19:30

Brazil	5–0	Ecuador
Evandro 2', 6'; Filipe Luís 29'; Quirino 46', 56'

Estadio Hernán Ramírez Villegas, Pereira, Colombia
Referee: Manuel Garay (Peru)

16 January 2005
19:40

Uruguay	0–0	Chile

Estadio Hernán Ramírez Villegas, Pereira, Colombia
Referee: Juan Paniagua (Bolivia)
16 January 2005
17:30

Brazil	1–1	Paraguay
Barcelos 57'		Bogado 63'

Estadio Hernán Ramírez Villegas, Pereira, Colombia
Referee: Carlos López (Colombia)

18 January 2005
18:00

Chile	3–2	Paraguay
Fernández 37'; Fuenzalida 52'; Lorca 69'		Acuña 15'; Bogado 59'

Estadio Centenario, Armenia
Referee: Manuel Garay (Peru)
18 January 2005
20:10

Uruguay	6–0	Ecuador
Albín 2', 6'; C. Rodríguez 29', 57'; Peinado 71'; J. Rodríguez 84'

Estadio Centenario, Armenia
Referee: Gustavo Brand (Venezuela)

20 January 2005
19:30

Brazil	4–2	Chile
Sóbis 15', 78'; Filipe Luís 46'; Quirino 66'		Montesinos 11'; Canales 47'

Estadio Centenario, Armenia
Referee: Gustavo Brand (Venezuela)
20 January 2005
17:20

Paraguay	4–2	Ecuador
Bogado 25'; Achilier 38' (o.g.); Segovia 51'; Acuña 57'		Valencia 2'; Arroyo 21'

Estadio Centenario, Armenia
Referee: Juan Paniagua (Bolivia)

22 January 2005
17:50

Chile	5–1	Ecuador
Canales 30', 51', 71'; Fernández 37'; Morales 75'		Valencia 80'

Estadio Hernán Ramírez Villegas, Pereira, Colombia
Referee: Carlos López (Colombia)
22 January 2005
20:00

Uruguay	0–0	Brazil

Estadio Hernán Ramírez Villegas, Pereira, Colombia
Referee: Gabriel Brazenas (Argentina)

== Final group ==
Team	Pts	Pld	W	D	L	GF	GA	Dif
Colombia	13	5	4	1	0	11	5	+6
Brazil	9	5	3	0	2	8	6	+2
Argentina	9	5	2	3	0	5	3	+2
Chile	5	5	1	2	2	10	11	-1
Uruguay	5	5	1	2	2	7	10	-3
Venezuela	0	5	0	0	5	3	9	-6

=== Results ===
25 January
19:00

Venezuela	0–1	Argentina
	Report	Granados 52' (o.g.)

Estadio Centenario, Armenia
Referee: Carlos López (Colombia)
25 January
19:30

Uruguay	2–4	Brazil
C. Rodríguez 39' (pen.); Ezquerra 45'	Report	Fernandinho 25' (pen.), 43'; Renato 50', 90'

Estadio Hernán Ramírez Villegas, Pereira, Colombia
Referee: Pablo Pozo (Chile)
25 January
21:10

Chile	3–4	Colombia
Meneses 1' (pen.); Montesinos 6'; Fuenzalida 64'	Report	Rodallega 20' (pen.), 67'; Aguilar 47'; Toja 75'

Estadio Centenario, Armenia
Referee: Juan Paniagua (Bolivia)

27 January
19:00

Chile	1–1	Argentina
Lorca 72'	Report	Lavezzi 38'

Estadio Palogrande, Manizales
Referee: Ricardo Grance (Paraguay)
27 January
19:00

Brazil	1–0	Venezuela
Paulinho 63'	Report

Estadio Hernán Ramírez Villegas, Pereira, Colombia
Referee: Gabriel Brazenas (Argentina)
27 January
21:10

Uruguay	1–3	Colombia
Albín 85'	Report	Rentería 31', 68'; Aguilar 43'

Estadio Palogrande, Manizales
Referee: Mauricio Reinoso (Ecuador)

29 January
20:00

Venezuela	2–3	Chile
Vargas 42', 67'	Report	Fuenzalida 59'; Montesinos 76'; Canales 78'

Estadio Centenario, Armenia
Referee: Manuel Garay (Peru)
30 January
15:10

Argentina	0–0	Uruguay
	Report

Estadio Hernán Ramírez Villegas, Pereira, Colombia
Referee: Héber Lopes (Brazil)
30 January
17:20

Colombia	1–0	Brazil
Rodallega 47'	Report

Estadio Hernán Ramírez Villegas, Pereira, Colombia
Referee: Martín Vázquez (Uruguay)

2 February
19:00

Brazil	2–1	Chile
Evandro 52' (pen.); Sóbis 90+2'	Report	Lorca 83'

Estadio Palogrande, Manizales
Referee: Carlos López (Colombia)
2 February
19:00

Venezuela	1–2	Uruguay
Ramírez 59'	Report	Albín 46'; Navarro 77'

Estadio Centenario, Armenia
Referee: Gabriel Brazenas (Argentina)
2 February
21:10

Argentina	1–1	Colombia
Garay 27'	Report	Rodallega 12' (pen.)

Estadio Centenario, Armenia
Referee: Ricardo Grance (Paraguay)

5 February
20:00

Chile	2–2	Uruguay
Fernández 24', 62'	Report	Ezquerra 37'; C. Rodríguez 78'

Estadio Centenario, Armenia
Referee: Héber Lopes (Brazil)
6 February
15:30

Colombia	2–0	Venezuela
Marrugo 23'; Rodallega 58'	Report

Estadio Palogrande, Manizales
Referee: Mauricio Reinoso (Ecuador)
6 February
17:40

Argentina	2–1	Brazil
Zabaleta 66'; Messi 75'	Report	Evandro 52'

Estadio Palogrande, Manizales
Referee: Martín Vázquez (Uruguay)

== Winners ==
2005 South American Youth Championship winners

Colombia
Second title

== Qualifiers for 2005 FIFA World Youth Championship ==
- Colombia
- Brazil
- Argentina
- Chile

== Top scorers ==
11 goals

- (Colombia) Hugo Rodallega

5 goals

- (Argentina) Lionel Messi
- (Chile) Nicolás Canales

4 goals

- (Brazil) Evandro
- (Chile) Matías Fernández
- (Uruguay) Cristian Rodríguez
- (Uruguay) Juan Albín
- (Venezuela) Paul Ramírez

3 goals

- (Argentina) Pablo Barrientos
- (Brazil) Rafael Sóbis
- (Brazil) Thiago Quirino
- (Chile) Juan Lorca
- (Chile) Sebastián Montecinos
- (Chile) José Pedro Fuenzalida
- (Paraguay) Cristian Bogado

2 goals

- (Argentina) Juan Manuel Torres
- (Bolivia) Nelson Sossa
- (Brazil) Fernandinho
- (Brazil) Filipe Luís
- (Brazil) Renato Ribeiro
- (Colombia) Abel Aguilar
- (Colombia) Cristian Marrugo
- (Colombia) Juan Carlos Toja
- (Colombia) Wason Rentería
- (Ecuador) Antonio Valencia
- (Paraguay) Carlos Javier Acuña
- (Uruguay) Leandro Ezquerra
- (Venezuela) Miku
- (Venezuela) Ronald Vargas
