= Mario Gómez (disambiguation) =

Mario Gómez (born 1985) is a German football striker.

Mario Gómez may also refer to:

== Academics ==
- Mario Ojeda Gómez (1927–2013), Mexican scholar and internationalist

== Sportspeople ==
=== Association football ===
- Mario Gómez (footballer, born 1957), Argentine football manager and former defender
- Mario Gómez (footballer, born February 1981), Spanish football right-back
- Mario Gómez (footballer, born May 1981), Peruvian football midfielder
- Mario Gómez (footballer, born August 1981), Honduran football midfielder
- Mário Gómez (footballer, born 1986), Colombian football midfielder
- Mario Gómez (footballer, born 1992), Spanish football centre-back

=== Other sports ===
- Mario Gómez (athlete) (1907–1971), Mexican sprinter

== Other ==
- Mario Gómez, oldest of the Chilean miners trapped in the 2010 Copiapó mining accident
- Mario "El Pájaro" Gómez, vocalist of Argentine rock band Vilma Palma e Vampiros
