= Bessala =

Bessala is a Cameroonian surname. Notable people with the surname include:

- Joseph Bessala (1941–2010), Cameroonian boxer
- Luc Bessala (born 1985), Cameroonian footballer
