= 2001 in Ecuadorian football =

Football in Ecuador
- Season: 2001

The 2001 season was the 79th season of competitive football in Ecuador.

== National leagues ==
=== Serie A ===
- Champion: Emelec (9th title)
- International cup qualifiers:
  - 2002 Copa Libertadores: Emelec, El Nacional, Olmedo
- Relegated: Delfín, LDU Portoviejo

=== Serie B ===
- Winner: LDU Quito (2nd title)
- Promoted: LDU Quito, Deportivo Cuenca
- Relegated: Deportivo Quevedo

=== Segunda ===
- Winner: Manta
- Promoted: Manta

== Clubs in international competitions ==
Team	2001 Copa Libertadores	2001 Copa Merconorte
Aucas	N/A	Eliminated in the Group Stage
Barcelona	N/A	Eliminated in the Group Stage
El Nacional	Eliminated in the Round of 16	N/A
Emelec	Eliminated in the Round of 16	Runner-up
Olmedo	Eliminated in the first round	N/A

== National teams ==
=== Senior team ===
The Ecuador national team played in fourteen matches in 2001: eight FIFA World Cup qualifiers, three Copa América matches, and three friendlies. At the end of the year, the team qualified for their first FIFA World Cup.

==== 2002 FIFA World Cup qualifiers ====
Ecuador finished their qualifying campaign to the 2002 FIFA World Cup. They finished 2nd in the region, behind Argentina and ahead of Brazil, to qualify to their first FIFA World Cup.

28 March 2001
15:00

Ecuador	1 – 0	Brazil
Delgado 49'	(Report)

Estadio Olímpico Atahualpa, Quito
Attendance: 40,800
Referee: Felipe Ramos Rizo (Mexico)

24 April 2001
16:00

Ecuador	2 – 1	Paraguay
Delgado 44', 52'	(Report)	Cardozo 26'

Estadio Olímpico Atahualpa, Quito
Attendance: 30,145
Referee: Ángel Sánchez (Argentina)

2 June 2001
16:00

Peru	1 – 2	Ecuador
Pizarro 2'	(Report)	Méndez 11'; Delgado 90'

Estadio Monumental "U", Lima
Attendance: 54,236
Referee: Antonio Marrufo (Mexico)

15 August 2001
16:00

Ecuador	0 – 2	Argentina
	(Report)	Verón 19'; Crespo 34' (pen.)

Estadio Olímpico Atahualpa, Quito
Attendance: 38,156
Referee: Stefano Braschi (Italy)

5 September 2001
20:30

Colombia	0 – 0	Ecuador
	(Report)

Estadio El Campín, Bogotá
Attendance: 28,487
Referee: Youssuf Al Aqily (Saudi Arabia Football Federation)

6 October 2001
16:00

Bolivia	1 – 5	Ecuador
Galindo 59'	(Report)	de la Cruz 13'; Delgado 23'; Kaviedes 56'; Fernández 89'; Gómez 90'

Estadio Hernando Siles, La Paz
Attendance: 8,000
Referee: Ángel Sánchez (Argentina)

7 November 2001
16:00

Ecuador	1 – 1	Uruguay
Kaviedes 72'	(Report)	Olivera 43' (pen.)

Estadio Olímpico Atahualpa, Quito
Attendance: 40,000
Referee: Felipe Ramos Rizo (Mexico)

14 November 2001
20:40

Chile	0 – 0	Ecuador
	(Report)

Estadio Nacional de Chile, Santiago
Attendance: 19,237
Referee: Juan Paniagua (Bolivia)

==== Copa América ====
Ecuador was drawn into Group A with hosts Colombia, Chile, and Venezuela. After finishing third in the group, as well has the third best third-place team, they were eliminated in the Group Stage.

Team	Pld	W	D	L	GF	GA	GD	Pts
Colombia	3	3	0	0	5	0	+5	9
Chile	3	2	0	1	5	3	+2	6
Ecuador	3	1	0	2	5	5	0	3
Venezuela	3	0	0	3	0	7	−7	0

11 July 2001
18:00 (UTC-5)

Ecuador	1 – 4	Chile
Chalá 53'	Report	Navia 29'; Montecinos 73', 90'; Corrales 85'

Estadio Metropolitano Roberto Meléndez, Barranquilla
Referee: Gilberto Hidalgo (Peru)

14 July 2001
18:30 (UTC-5)

Colombia	1 – 0	Ecuador
Aristizábal 29'	Report

Estadio Metropolitano Roberto Meléndez, Barranquilla
Referee: Ubaldo Aquino (Paraguay)

17 July 2001
18:30 (UTC-5)

Ecuador	4 – 0	Venezuela
Delgado 19', 63'; Fernández 29'; Méndez 60'	Report

Estadio Metropolitano Roberto Meléndez, Barranquilla
Referee: Gilberto Hidalgo (Peru)

==== Friendlies ====
7 June 2001

United States	0 – 0	Ecuador

Columbus Crew Stadium, Columbus
Attendance: 12,572
Referee: José Martínez (Canada)

2 July 2001

Ecuador	1 – 0	El Salvador
Chalá 87'

Giants Stadium, East Rutherford, New Jersey
Attendance: 12,572

7 July 2001

Ecuador	1 – 1	Honduras
Chalá 90'		Martínez 47'

Orange Bowl, Miami
Attendance: 10,000
Referee: Richard Green (United States)
