= Rodrigo Dias =

Rodrigo Dias may refer to:

- Rodrigo Dias (Brazilian footballer) (born 1994)
- Rodrigo Dias (Portuguese footballer) (born 2005)
