= Arthur (footballer, born 1986) =

Brazilian footballer

Personal information
- Full name: Arthur Santa Rita da Lima
- Date of birth: 25 May 1986 (age 40)
- Place of birth: São Paulo, Brazil
- Height: 1.73 m (5 ft 8 in)
- Position: Midfielder

Youth career
- –2005: São Paulo

Senior career*
Years	Team	Apps	(Gls)
2005–2007	São Paulo	1	(0)
2007	Iraty		
2008	Rio Branco		
2008–2009	Sheikh Russel		
2009	Bragantino	3	(0)
2010	Flamengo-SP	0	(0)
2011	Concórdia	0	(0)
2011	Vilavelhense		
2013	Concórdia		

International career^{‡}
2003	Brazil U17	2	(0)
- * Club domestic league appearances and goals as of 20:25, 29 May 2017 (UTC) ‡ National team caps and goals as of 20:25, 29 May 2017 (UTC)

Arthur Santa Rita da Lima (born 25 May 1986), commonly known as Arthur, is a Brazilian footballer who last played for Concórdia.

== Club career ==
Arthur started his career with São Paulo, making one Campeonato Brasileiro Série A appearance in 2005. He traveled with the squad for friendly games in New Delhi in 2007.

His next professional game would come in 2009 for Bragantino, when he came on as a 61st-minute substitute for Sandro Costa da Silva in a 4–1 away win against América Futebol Clube in the 2009 Série B.

== International career ==
Arthur represented Brazil at the 2003 FIFA U-17 World Championship, playing in two games - both as a substitute - as his side were crowned champions.

== Career statistics ==
=== Club ===
As of 5 June 2017

Club	Season	League			State League		Cup		Continental		Other		Total	
Club	Season	Division	Apps	Goals	Apps	Goals	Apps	Goals	Apps	Goals	Apps	Goals	Apps	Goals
São Paulo	2005	Série A	1	0	0	0	0	0	–		0	0	1	0
Bragantino	2009	Série B	3	0	0	0	0	0	–		0	0	3	0
Flamengo-SP	2010	–			11 (Note: Appearances in the Campeonato Paulista A2)	0	0	0	–		0	0	11	0
Concórdia	2011	–			2 (Note: Appearances in the Campeonato Catarinense)	0	0	0	–		0	0	2	0
Career total			4	0	13	0	0	0	0	0	0	0	17	0
