= Carlos Villanueva (Chilean footballer) =

Chilean footballer (born 1986)

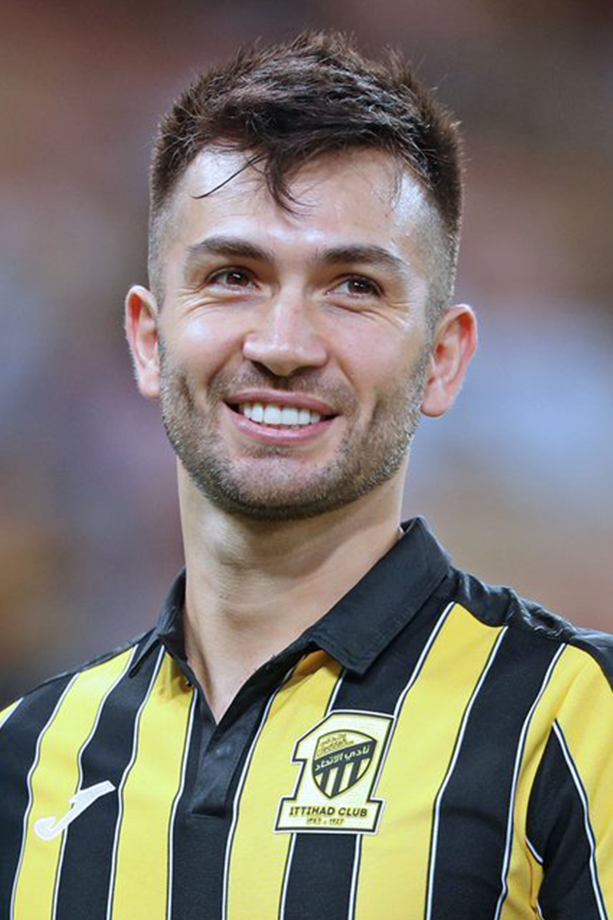
- Villanueva with Al-Ittihad in 2019

Personal information
- Full name: Carlos Andrés Villanueva Rolland
- Date of birth: 5 February 1986 (age 40)
- Place of birth: Viña del Mar, Chile
- Height: 1.73 m (5 ft 8 in)
- Position: Attacking midfielder

Youth career
- 1993–2000: El Romeral
- 2000–2003: Deportes La Serena

Senior career*
Years	Team	Apps	(Gls)
2003	Deportes La Serena	15	(5)
2004–2009	Audax Italiano	110	(50)
2008–2009	→ Blackburn Rovers (loan)	13	(0)
2009–2016	Al Shabab Dubai	117	(31)
2013	→ Universidad Católica (loan)	12	(1)
2016–2020	Al-Ittihad	106	(15)
2020	Al-Fayha	16	(4)
2020–2022	Palestino	52	(10)
2022–2023	Magallanes	39	(2)
2024	Audax Italiano	13	(0)
Total		493	(118)

International career
2003	Chile U17		
2005	Chile U20	3	(0)
2007–2010	Chile	13	(1)
- * Club domestic league appearances and goals

Carlos Andrés Villanueva Rolland (born 5 February 1986) is a Chilean former professional footballer who played as a midfielder.

== Club career ==
=== Audax Italiano ===
In the Copa Libertadores 2007, the left-footed playmaker was the hub of Audax Italiano. The team was not able to qualify for the knockout phase due to goal differential. Villanueva was rewarded with a call-up to Chile's Copa América 2007 squad.

=== Blackburn Rovers ===
On 17 July 2008, it was confirmed by Villanueva's agents and also former club that Villanueva would play for the Blackburn Rovers of the Premier League in England. He also confirmed this on 29 July, pending a work permit being issued.

On 2 August, Villanueva completed his season-long loan move to Blackburn. The club had the option to make the deal permanent, at a pre-agreed fee. Villanueva also agreed terms to extend his contract for a further three years, if the option is exercised.

On 27 August, Villanueva made his debut for Blackburn in a League Cup game against Grimsby Town, a match in which he scored his first goal for the club. He also set up a goal for striker Matt Derbyshire in the 4–1 win. His debut was delayed by a few weeks due to the virus, chicken pox which forced him to stay away from club training facilities, so that he did not pass on the virus to other staff.

On 20 September, Villanueva made his (home) debut in the Premier League as a late second-half substitute against Fulham, his impact was immediate and substantial. Linking up well to provide a looping cross for Roque Santa Cruz to head down for the winning goal, which was converted by Derbyshire.

He made his full starting Premier League debut on 27 September, against Newcastle United at St. James' Park, getting an assist providing a cross for a headed goal for Christopher Samba.

On 5 January 2009, he scored a free kick against Blyth Spartans in the FA Cup giving his team the lead, and on 4 February he assisted two goals against Sunderland in the FA Cup. On 11 April, he played in the Premier League for the first time since Sam Allardyce took charge of Blackburn.

=== Al-Shabab ===
On 15 May 2009, Audax Italiano Villanueva signed for Al Shabab, the Emirati club paid Audax about $5 million. Although he publicly stated he wished to have stayed at Blackburn and tried to established himself in one of the world's top leagues.

=== Universidad Católica ===
On 4 February 2013, Al Shabab confirms that Villanueva will play on loan at Universidad Católica until 31 May.

=== Al-Ittihad ===
On 15 July 2016, Villanueva joined Al Ittihad, in the Saudi Professional League.

=== Magallanes ===
In June 2022, Villanueva rescinded his contract with Palestino and moved to Primera B club Magallanes. He ended his contract in December 2023.

=== Return to Audax Italiano ===
In 2024, Villanueva rejoined Audax Italiano after fifteen years. At the end of the season, he announced his retirement.

== International career ==
Villanueva represented Chile U17 at the 2003 South American U-17 Championship and Chile U20 at the 2005 South American U-20 Championship.

He was also capped for the senior squad and played for Chile in the Copa América 2007, where he scored a superb free kick goal against Ecuador on his first official game with the senior squad. He is also credited with an assist during Chile's qualifier game at Uruguay. However, he was not called up to the 30-man preliminary squad for Chile for the South Africa World Cup.

== Post-retirement ==
In March 2025, Villanueva signed with TNT Sports Chile as a football commentator.

== Personal life ==
The Villanueva family has a close friendship with the footballer Luis Jiménez's family. In addition to the fact that Villanueva coincided with Jiménez in Al-Ittihad, Jiménez and his wife, María José, are the godparents of the Villanueva's son as well as Villanueva and his wife are the godparents of the Jiménez's children.

== Career statistics ==
Date	Venue	Opponent	Score	Result	Competition
27 June 2007	Polideportivo Cachamay, Puerto Ordaz, Venezuela	Ecuador	3–2	3–2	2007 Copa América

== Honours ==
Al-Ittihad

- Crown Prince Cup: 2016–17
- King Cup: 2018

Individual

- Saudi Professional League Player of the Season: 2017–18
- King Cup top goalscorer: 2018
