= Unisa Bangura =

Sierra Leonean footballer

Personal information
- Full name: Unisa Bangura
- Date of birth: July 23, 1987 (age 39)
- Place of birth: Freetown, Sierra Leone
- Height: 6 ft 0 in (1.83 m)
- Position: Goalkeeper

Senior career*
Years	Team	Apps	(Gls)
2005	Klubi-04	11	(0)
2006	HJK	21	(0)
2007–2010	Atlantis FC	11	(0)
2008–2009	→ East End Lions (loan)	34	(0)
2011–2012	PK-35	2	(0)

International career
2002–2003	Sierra Leone U-17	7	(0)
- * Club domestic league appearances and goals

Unisa Bangura (born 23 July 1987 in Freetown, Sierra Leone) is a Sierra Leonean footballer.

== Career ==
Unisa began his European career with Klubi-04 and played 11 games in the 2005 Ykkönen season before joining HJK. In January 2007, he moved to Atlantis FC.

Bangura left Europe and signed a loan contract by East End Lions in January 2008, but in April 2010 returned to Atlantis FC.

== International career ==
Unisa was Sierra Leone's second-choice goalkeeper behind Patrick Bantamoi at the 2003 FIFA U-17 World Championship in Finland.
