= S.D. Centro Italo Venezolano =

Venezuelan football club

Centro Ítalo Venezolano
- Full name: SD Centro Ítalo FC
- Nickname(s): Los del ítalo, Italianos, Azules, Itálicos
- Founded: 26 March 1964
- Ground: Estadio Brígido Iriarte; Caracas, Venezuela
- Capacity: 15,000
- Chairman: Antonio Mattiolli
- Manager: Alessandro Corridore
- League: Segunda División
- 2009–10: 17th (relegated)
Home colours	Away colours

The club Centro Ítalo Venezolano (usually called CIV) was a professional football club promoted to Segunda División in 2009, based in Caracas.

== Achievements ==
- Segunda División Venezolana: 1

Clausura 2009

== Current first team squad ==
Note: Flags indicate national team as defined under FIFA eligibility rules; some limited exceptions apply. Players may hold more than one non-FIFA nationality.

No.	Pos.	Nation	Player
1	GK	(Venezuela) VEN	José Mazzone
11	MF	(Venezuela) VEN	José Oviedo
11	DF	(Argentina) ARG	Pablo Piyuka
12	GK	(Venezuela) VEN	Edgar Pérez
15	DF	(Argentina) ARG	Guillermo Cejas
17	DF	(Venezuela) VEN	Edson Rodriguez
18	DF	(Venezuela) VEN	Emilio Garcés
—	DF	(Venezuela) VEN	Alveiro Aislant
—	DF	(Venezuela) VEN	Marcos Gutíerrez

No.	Pos.	Nation	Player
—	DF	(Venezuela) VEN	Elias Leal
—	MF	(Venezuela) VEN	Angelo Rodríguez
—	MF	(Venezuela) VEN	Enrique Cegarra
—	MF	(Cameroon) CMR	Luc Bessala
—	MF	(Venezuela) VEN	Jeancarlos Brito
—	FW	(Venezuela) VEN	Philippe Estevez
—	FW	(Venezuela) VEN	Paul Ramirez
—	FW	(Uruguay) URU	Diego Silva
