= Philippe Estevez =

Venezuelan footballer (born 1983)

Personal information
- Date of birth: December 12, 1983 (age 42)
- Place of birth: Caracas, Venezuela
- Height: 1.73 m (5 ft 8 in)
- Position: Midfielder

Senior career*
Years	Team	Apps	(Gls)
1999–2002	Caracas F.C.		
2003–2004	Trujillanos F.C.		
2004–2005	Unión Atlético Maracaibo		
2005	Vigía F.C.	2	(0)
2005–2007	Carabobo	10	(0)
2007	Deportes Concepción	2	(0)
2007–2010	Zulia F.C.	32	(20)
2010	Unión Atlético Maracaibo	14	(4)
2010–2011	Atlético Venezuela		
2011–2012	Centro Italo		
- * Club domestic league appearances and goals

Philippe Esteves (born December 12, 1983, in Caracas, Venezuela) is a former Venezuelan footballer currently playing for clubs of Venezuela and Chile.

== Teams ==
- (Venezuela) Caracas Futbol Club 1999–2002
- (Venezuela) Trujillanos Club Futbol 2003–2004
- (Venezuela) Union Atletico Maracaibo 2004–2005
- (Venezuela) Vigia Futbol Club 2005
- (Venezuela) Carabobo FC 2005–2007
- (Chile) Deportes Concepción 2007
- (Venezuela) Zulia FC 2007–2010
- (Venezuela) Unión Atlético Maracaibo 2010
- Atletico Venezuela 2010–2011
- (Venezuela) Centro Italo 2011–12
