= Carlos Servin =

Paraguayan footballer (born 1987)

Personal information
- Full name: Carlos María Servín Caballero
- Date of birth: 24 May 1987 (age 39)
- Place of birth: Asunción, Paraguay
- Height: 1.86 m (6 ft 1 in)
- Position: Goalkeeper

Team information
- Current team: 2 de Mayo
- Number: 12

Senior career*
Years	Team	Apps	(Gls)
2005–2014	Tacuary	122	
2013	→ Rubio Ñu (loan)	15	(0)
2013–2014	→ Vitória (loan)	3	(0)
2014–2015	Olimpia	0	(0)
2015	Deportivo Santaní	10	(0)
2016	Deportivo Capiatá	37	(0)
2017–2022	Libertad	35	(0)
2022–2023	Tacuary Asunción	59	(0)
2023	Guaireña	10	(0)
2024–	2 de Mayo	63	(0)
- * Club domestic league appearances and goals as of 13 August 2025

Carlos María Servín Caballero (born 24 May 1987) is a Paraguayan international footballer who plays for as a goalkeeper for 2 de Mayo in the Primera División Paraguaya.

== Career ==
=== Youth career ===
In 2002, Servin was crowned champion of Paraguay's Primera B with Sportivo Trinidense's youth team. In this, he was teammates with Juan Paniagua and coached by Ruben Pereira.

=== Tacuary ===
In 2005, Servin debuted for Tacuary.

On 28 December 2021, it was announced that Servin joined Tacuary for the 2022 season. He was the club's first new signing for the 2022 season.

== International career ==
He made his international debut for Paraguay in 2011.
