= Xu Qun =

Chinese footballer

Xu Qun 徐群
Personal information
- Full name: Xu Qun
- Date of birth: January 22, 1986 (age 40)
- Place of birth: Qingdao, China
- Height: 1.78 m (5 ft 10 in)
- Position: Defender

Youth career
- 1999–2004: Shandong Luneng

Senior career*
Years	Team	Apps	(Gls)
2004–2006	Shandong Luneng	0	(0)
2007–2009	Qingdao Jonoon	18	(0)
Medal record
Representing China
Men's football
AFC U-17 Championship
Bronze medal – third place	2002 UAE	Team
- * Club domestic league appearances and goals

Xu Qun (Chinese: 徐群) (born 22 January 1986 in Qingdao) is a Chinese former football player.

== Club career ==
=== Shandong Luneng ===
Xu Qun started his professional football career with Shandong Luneng in 2004 after he graduated from their various youth teams. He could not make any senior level appearances for them during this time.

=== Qingdao Jonoon ===
By 2007 Xu Qun was allowed to transfer to Qingdao Jonoon along with fellow player Liu Qing. Xu Qun would make his debut against Shenzhen Shangqingyin on June 17, 2007, in a 2–0 win.

== National team ==
=== U-17 National Team ===
Xu was a key member of China U-17 National Team compete in 2003 FIFA U-17 World Championship.
