= Luc Bessala =

Cameroonian footballer (born 1985)

Personal information
- Full name: Luc Bessala
- Date of birth: 21 September 1985 (age 41)
- Place of birth: Yaoundé, Cameroon
- Height: 1.80 m (5 ft 11 in)
- Position: Defender

Senior career*
Years	Team	Apps	(Gls)
2002–2003	Canon Yaoundé	0	(0)
2004–2005	Tiro Federal	24	(4)
2006	Provincial Osorno	–	(–)
2007	Deportes Temuco	24	(1)
2008	Fernández Vial	6	(0)
2008–2011	Centro Ítalo	31	(4)
2011–2012	Miranda	–	(–)
2012	Metropolitanos	–	(–)
- * Club domestic league appearances and goals as of 20:21, 8 March 2021 (UTC)

Luc Bessala (born 21 September 1985) is a Cameroonian former professional footballer who played as a defender.
