= Rodrigo Dias (Portuguese footballer) =

Portuguese footballer (born 2005)

Personal information
- Full name: Rodrigo Miguel Amores Dias
- Date of birth: 12 July 2005 (age 21)
- Place of birth: Lisbon, Portugal
- Height: 1.79 m (5 ft 10 in)
- Position: Left back

Team information
- Current team: Sporting CP B
- Number: 50

Youth career
- 2011–2025: Sporting CP

Senior career*
| Years | Team | Apps | (Gls) |
| 2025– | Sporting CP B | 52 | (1) |
| 2026– | Sporting CP | 1 | (0) |

International career^{‡}
| 2024–2025 | Portugal U20 | 4 | (0) |
- * Club domestic league appearances and goals ‡ National team caps and goals as of 17:39, 2 November 2026 (UTC)

Rodrigo Miguel Amores Dias (born 12 July 2005) is a Portuguese professional footballer who plays as a left back for Sporting CP B.

== Club career ==
Born in Lisbon, Dias joined the youth team of local Sporting CP in 2011. He was part of the under-17 team who were national champions in 2021–22. In October 2023, as an 18-year-old in the club's under-19 and under-23 teams, he signed a new contract. He was part of the reserve team that won promotion from Liga 3 in 2025, and in July that year he signed a new deal to 2028 and was promoted indefinitely to the B team. In his first full season with them, he played 31 games and scored in a 3–0 win away to Paços de Ferreira on 10 February 2026.

Dias made his first-team debut in a friendly match on 25 July 2026, a 2–0 win over Monaco for the Troféu Cinco Violinos. His Primeira Liga debut came on 11 August, playing the full 90 minutes as the team drew 2–2 at Estrela da Amadora; he was covering the suspension of Maximiliano Araújo, who was sent off in the 2026 Taça de Portugal final.

== International career ==
Dias played four games for Portugal under-20, starting with a 1–1 draw with Italy on 14 October 2024.
