= Kola Anubi =

Nigerian footballer

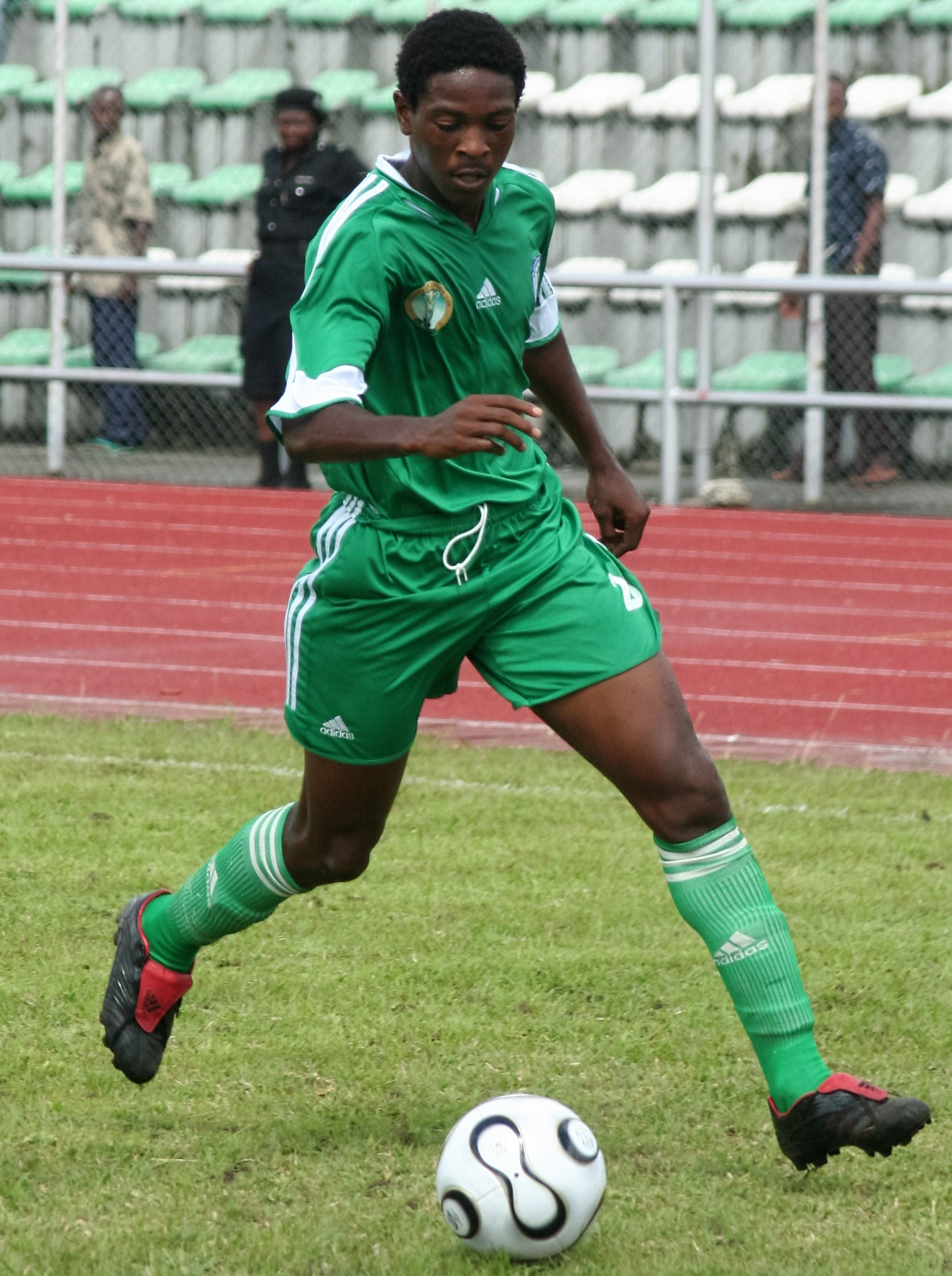

Personal information
- Full name: Oluwaseun Kolawole Anubi
- Date of birth: 24 March 1987 (age 39)
- Place of birth: Zaria, Nigeria
- Height: 1.76 m (5 ft 9 in)
- Position: Midfielder

Youth career
- 2002-2003: Kaduna United F.C.

Senior career*
Years	Team	Apps	(Gls)
2004–2005	Internacional		
2005	Bendel Insurance		
2005–2008	Dolphins		
2008	→ Akwa United (loan)		
2008–2010	Enyimba		
2010–2013	Sharks		
2013–2015	Warri Wolves	32	(1)
2015–2016	Enugu Rangers		
2016–2017	Rivers United		
2017–2018	Sunshine Stars		

International career
2003	Nigeria U-17	3	(0)
2005	Nigeria U-20	2	(0)
- * Club domestic league appearances and goals as of 31 December 2009

Oluwaseun Kolawole Anubi (born 24 March 1987) is a Nigerian former professional footballer who played as a midfielder. He played for Sport Club Internacional in the Campeonato Brasileiro Série A and represented Nigeria at various youth international levels. Anubi played a key role for both the Golden Eaglets under-17 team and the Flying Eagles under-20 team.

== Early life ==
Anubi was born and raised in Zaria, Kaduna State, Nigeria, but hails from Remo Local Government Area in Ogun State. He began playing football during his school years and attended Comprehensive College Zaria, where he was active in school football competitions. His passion for the sport grew through his involvement with youth clubs including Express FC and Kada United (Kaduna United F.C.), where he developed the foundational skills that prepared him for a professional football career.

== Career ==
Anubi began playing football at a young age, featuring for youth teams such as Comprehensive College Zaria, Express FC, and Kada United (now known as Kaduna United). He later joined Bendel Insurance, where he progressed through the youth ranks and began his senior career.

In 2003, Anubi represented Nigeria at the FIFA U-17 World Championship held in Finland, making appearances in all three of the team's group-stage matches. He was later selected for the Nigeria U-20 squad that participated in the 2005 FIFA World Youth Championship in the Netherlands.

Anubi moved from Bendel Insurance a team competing in Nigeria Premier Football League to Sport Club Internacional, which competes in Brazil's top-flight Campeonato Brasileiro Série A. He returned to Bendel Insurance in July 2005 and later joined Dolphins F.C. in 2006, he was loaned to Akwa United F.C. in 2008 and returned to Enyimba in September of the same year. In 2010, he played for Sharks of Port Harcourt, now known as Rivers United F.C.

In 2015, Anubi joined Enugu Rangers International F.C. Following his arrival, he participated in a friendly match against Purple Krown College, where he scored the fourth goal in the 85th minute, contributing to a 4–2 victory for the team. He further extended his domestic experience, In 2017, Anubi continued his career by signing with Sunshine Stars, a club competing in the Nigeria Professional Football League. Having previously played for Rivers United in year 2016.

== International ==
He was a member of the Nigerian team (Flying Eagles) at 2005 FIFA World Youth Championship in the Netherlands where he played two games. He used to be a member of the Nigerian team (Golden Eaglets) at 2003 FIFA U-17 World Championship in Finland and played all three games.
