= Ou Ya =

Chinese footballer

Ou Ya 欧亚
Personal information
- Full name: Ou Ya
- Date of birth: 14 February 1986 (age 40)
- Place of birth: Baoding, Hebei, China
- Height: 1.93 m (6 ft 4 in)
- Position: Goalkeeper

Senior career*
Years	Team	Apps	(Gls)
2006–2007	Tianjin Teda	2	(0)
2008–2010	Anhui Jiufang	54	(0)
2011–2013	Shenyang Zhongze	47	(0)
2014–2018	Hebei China Fortune	26	(0)
- * Club domestic league appearances and goals as of 11 November 2018

Ou Ya (Chinese: 欧亚; born 14 February 1986 in Baoding) is a Chinese footballer.

== Club career ==
Ou Ya started his professional football career in 2006 when he joined Tianjin Teda for the 2006 Chinese Super League campaign. On 15 October 2006, he made his debut for Tianjin Teda in the 2006 Chinese Super League against Qingdao Jonoon. In March 2008, Ou moved to another China League One club Anhui Jiufang.

On 29 January 2014, Ou transferred to another China League One side Hebei Zhongji.

== Career statistics ==
Statistics accurate as of match played 11 November 2018.

Club performance			League		Cup		League Cup		Continental		Total	
Season	Club	League	Apps	Goals	Apps	Goals	Apps	Goals	Apps	Goals	Apps	Goals
China PR			League		FA Cup		CSL Cup		Asia		Total	
2006	Tianjin Teda	Chinese Super League	2	0	0	0	-		-		2	0
2007	Tianjin Teda	Chinese Super League	0	0	-		-		-		0	0
2008	Anhui Jiufang	China League One	15	0	-		-		-		15	0
2009	Anhui Jiufang	China League One	20	0	-		-		-		20	0
2010	Anhui Jiufang	China League One	19	0	-		-		-		19	0
2011	Shenyang Zhongze	China League One	22	0	0	0	-		-		22	0
2012	Shenyang Zhongze	China League One	13	0	2	0	-		-		15	0
2013	Shenyang Zhongze	China League One	12	0	0	0	-		-		12	0
2014	Hebei China Fortune	China League One	23	0	0	0	-		-		23	0
2015	Hebei China Fortune	China League One	2	0	3	0	-		-		5	0
2016	Hebei China Fortune	Chinese Super League	0	0	4	0	-		-		4	0
2017	Hebei China Fortune	Chinese Super League	0	0	2	0	-		-		2	0
2018	Hebei China Fortune	Chinese Super League	1	0	2	0	-		-		3	0
Total	China PR		129	0	13	0	0	0	0	0	142	0
