= Ibrahim Tahini =

Sierra Leonean footballer (born 1987)

Personal information
- Full name: Ibrahim Khalil Tahini
- Date of birth: 25 July 1987 (age 39)
- Place of birth: Freetown, Sierra Leone
- Height: 1.73 m (5 ft 8 in)
- Position: Forward

Youth career
- –2001: FC Kallon
- 2002–2003: Old Edwardians
- 2003–2006: Falkenbergs FF

Senior career*
Years	Team	Apps	(Gls)
2007–2010	Melleruds IF		
2010–2012	IK Oddevold	40	(21)
2012	→ Svarteborg Dingle IF (loan)	5	(9)
2012	→ Vänersborgs IF (loan)	10	(14)
2013	Vänersborgs IF	28	(22)
2014	Vänersborgs FK	8	(3)
2014	IFK Åmål	8	(3)
2015	Stenungsunds IF	9	(3)
2016	IFK Uddevalla	14	(3)
2017	Trollhättans FK	18	(27)
2018	Trollhättan Syrianska FK	6	(9)
2018	IK Svane	2	(0)
2018–2019	Herrestads AIF	21	(36)
2019	IK Svane	4	(0)
2020	Åsebro IF	8	(20)
2021	IFK Uddevalla	13	(13)
2022	Fengersfors IK	12	(6)

International career
2003	Sierra Leone U17	6	(0)
- * Club domestic league appearances and goals as of 12:57, 27 June 2024 (UTC)

Ibrahim Tahini (born 25 July 1987) is a Sierra Leonean former professional footballer who played as a forward.

== Club career ==
Tahini came to Sweden as a 15-year-old and first played for Falkenbergs FF. In 2009, while playing for Melleruds IF, he was scouted by Gefle IF. He was Melleruds's top scorer in the 2009 season with 12 goals and trained with Gefle of the Allsvenskan, Superettan's Assyriska, Nybergsund of the Norwegian First Division and Swedish Division 1's Dalkurd.

In 2010 Tahini signed for IK Oddevold from Melleruds IF. In early May 2012, due to lack of playing time, Tahini and IK Oddevold agreed to terminate his contract. Having trained with IFK Uddevalla, he moved to lower league team Svarteborg Dingle IF later that month. On 4 July 2012, Tahini joined Vänersborgs IF on a loan deal.

In November 2012 he was on a trial with Swedish Division 1 South side FC Trollhättan.

Tahini joined Stenungsunds IF in January 2015.

== International career ==
Tahini was a member of the Sierra Leone U17 national team that lost in the final to Cameroon at the 2003 African U-17 Championship, thereby qualifying for 2003 FIFA U-17 World Championship in Finland.

He made his senior international debut for Sierra Leone in a 2005 friendly against Liberia in Freetown.
