= Layneker Zafra =

Venezuelan footballer (born 1986)

Personal information
- Full name: Layneker Evelio Zafra Martínez
- Date of birth: 23 May 1986 (age 40)
- Place of birth: San Cristóbal, Venezuela
- Height: 1.78 m (5 ft 10 in)
- Position: Defender

Senior career*
Years	Team	Apps	(Gls)
2005	Italmaracaibo		
2006–2007	Monagas		
2007	UA Maracaibo		
2008	Monagas		
2008–2009	UA Maracaibo		
2009	Monagas		
2010	Cortuluá		
2010–2011	Deportivo Táchira		
2011–2014	Zamora		
2015	Carabobo		
2015	Atlético Huila		
2015	América de Cali		
2015–2016	Atlético Venezuela		
2017–	Deportivo Táchira		
- * Club domestic league appearances and goals as of 21 March 2017

Layneker Evelio Zafra Martínez (born May 23, 1986), known as Layneker Zafra or simply Zafra, is a Venezuelan footballer who plays as defender at Deportivo Táchira.
