= César Martínez (footballer, born 1986) =

Paraguayan footballer (born 1986)

Personal information
- Full name: César David Martínez
- Date of birth: 26 February 1986 (age 40)
- Place of birth: Luque, Paraguay
- Height: 1.81 m (5 ft 11 in)
- Position: Defender

Senior career*
| Years | Team | Apps | (Gls) |
| 2004–2006 | Sportivo Luqueño | 42 | (3) |
| 2007 | The Strongest | 31 | (1) |
| 2007–2008 | Silvio Pettirossi | 12 | (1) |
| 2009–2011 | Lota Schwager | 16 | (1) |
| 2011 | San Lorenzo | – | (–) |
| Total | | 101 | (6) |
- * Club domestic league appearances and goals

César David Martínez (born 26 February 1986) is a former Paraguayan footballer who played as a defender.

He played for clubs like San Lorenzo and Chilean team Lota Schwager.
