= Libis Arenas =

Colombian footballer (born 1987)

Personal information
- Full name: Libis Andrés Arenas Murillo
- Date of birth: May 12, 1987 (age 39)
- Place of birth: Istmina, Colombia
- Position: Goalkeeper

Team information
- Current team: Fortaleza

Youth career
- –2005: Envigado

Senior career*
Years	Team	Apps	(Gls)
2004–2006	Envigado	12	(0)
2006–2007	Lazio	0	(0)
2007	→ Envigado (loan)		
2007–2008	Mérida	0	(0)
2007–2008	→ Central Español (loan)		
2008	Sportivo Luqueño		
2008	Deportivo Pereira	7	(0)
2009–2010	Peñarol		
2011	Patriotas		
2011–2012	Villa Teresa		
2011–2012	→ Peñarol (loan)		
2012	América de Cali	10	(0)
2014	Santa Fe		
2015–	Fortaleza		

International career
2006	Colombia	3	(0)
- * Club domestic league appearances and goals as of 4 June 2015

Libis Andrés Arenas Murillo (born 12 May 1987) is a retired Colombian football (soccer) goalkeeper.

He started his career with Envigado Fútbol Club. S.S. Lazio then made a deal to buy him, but did not include him in the first team in order not to fill a non-EU spot in the squad. He was on loan to Envigado in January 2007. He had also been on trial to Sporting Clube de Portugal in early 2007.

He was sold to Mérida UD and loaned to Central Español.

He is the third Colombian 2005 U-20 World Cup player following Abel Aguilar and Cristián Zapata to be signed by an Italian club.

== Titles ==
Season	Club	Title
2009-10	CA Peñarol	Liga Profesional de Primera División
