= Rodrigo Roman =

Paraguayan footballer (born 1986)

Personal information
- Full name: Rodrigo Nicolo Román Valdez
- Date of birth: 20 June 1986 (age 40)
- Place of birth: Asunción, Paraguay
- Height: 1.77 m (5 ft 10 in)
- Position: Left back

Team information
- Current team: Cerro Porteño

Senior career*
Years	Team	Apps	(Gls)
2007–	Cerro Porteño	5	(0)
- * Club domestic league appearances and goals as of 23:35, 3 February 2010 (UTC)

Rodrigo Nicolo Román Valdez (born 20 June 1986) is a Paraguayan footballer who plays as a defender for Cerro Porteño.
