= Juan Pablo Farfán =

Peruvian footballer (born 1985)

Personal information
- Full name: Juan Pablo Farfán Bravo
- Date of birth: 2 February 1985 (age 41)
- Place of birth: Lima, Peru
- Height: 1.75 m (5 ft 9 in)
- Position: Defender

Senior career*
Years	Team	Apps	(Gls)
2003–2007	Alianza Lima		
2008–2009	Antofagasta		
2010	León de Huánuco		
- * Club domestic league appearances and goals

Juan Pablo Farfán Bravo (born 2 February 1985) is a Peruvian former professional footballer who played as a defender.
