= Sandro (footballer, born February 1987) =

Brazilian footballer

Personal information
- Full name: Sandro Costa da Silva
- Date of birth: February 13, 1987 (age 39)
- Place of birth: São Paulo, Brazil
- Height: 1.79 m (5 ft 10 in)
- Position: Attacking midfielder

Team information
- Current team: Figueirense

Youth career
- 2000–2005: Corinthians

Senior career*
Years	Team	Apps	(Gls)
2006–2007	Grêmio		
2007	Figueirense		
- * Club domestic league appearances and goals

Sandro Costa da Silva (born February 13, 1987, in São Paulo), or simply Sandro, is a Brazilian attacking midfielder. He currently plays for Figueirense.

== Contract ==
- 14 May 2007 to 31 December 2009
