= Leandro Ezquerra =

Uruguayan footballer (born 1986)

Personal information
- Full name: Leandro Ezquerra De León
- Date of birth: June 5, 1986 (age 40)
- Place of birth: Montevideo, Uruguay
- Height: 1.73 m (5 ft 8 in)
- Position: Midfielder

Youth career
- River Plate Montevideo

Senior career*
| Years | Team | Apps | (Gls) |
| 2004–2011 | River Plate Montevideo | 95 | (11) |
| 2009–2010 | → Defensor Sporting (loan) | 12 | (0) |
| 2011 | El Tanque Sisley | 10 | (1) |
| 2012 | Pelotas | – | (–) |
| 2012–2013 | Atlético Venezuela | 29 | (5) |
| 2013–2014 | Racing Montevideo | 16 | (4) |
| 2014–2015 | Huachipato | 29 | (1) |
| 2015–2016 | Racing Montevideo | 22 | (5) |
| 2017 | Juventud Las Piedras | 19 | (1) |
| 2017 | Fénix | 8 | (0) |
| 2018–2019 | Torque | 23 | (1) |
| 2020–2021 | Montevideo City Torque | 17 | (0) |

International career
| 2005 | Uruguay U20 | | |
| 2007 | Uruguay | 1 | (0) |

Managerial career
- 2022–2023: Montevideo Wanderers (assistant)
- 2025–: Montevideo City Torque (youth)
- * Club domestic league appearances and goals

Leandro Ezquerra De León (born June 5, 1986, in Montevideo, Uruguay), is a Uruguayan former footballer.

== Club career ==
He has been playing in River Plate since 2004. In 2004, he obtained the title for Uruguayan Second Division as his team got the promotion needed to play in First Division.

Ezquerra retired in 2021 after playing for Montevideo City Torque.

== International career ==
During 2005, he took part in Uruguay national team U20 and played in the South American U20 Championship held in Colombia on the same year.

In 2007, Ezquerra made an appearance of the Uruguay senior team against South Africa on 12 September.
