= Juan Paniagua =

Paraguayan footballer (born 1985)

Juan Angel Paniagua (born 18 May 1985) is a Paraguayan former footballer who played as a defender.

== Career ==
=== Sportivo Trinidense ===
Paniagua was born in Asunción, Paraguay. In 2002, he was crowned champion of Paraguay's Primera B with Sportivo Trinidense's youth team. In this, he was teammates with goalkeeper Carlos Servin and coached by Ruben Pereira. In July 2009, Paniagua played in an important victory for Sportivo Trinidense against General Caballero ZC which placed the team in first position of the División Intermedia. In 2009, his coach at Sportivo Trinidense was Gabino Roman.

=== Capitan Figari ===
In September 2011, Paniagua played for Capitan Figari in a 2–1 home victory against Humaitá in the Primera C. In August 2012, he played for Capitan Figari in a 1–0 victory over Club Martin Ledesma in the Primera B. In June 2015, Paniagua scored in the 84th minute to equalize 2–2 in a draw against Fulgencio Yegros in the Primera B. In June 2018, Paniagua played in a 1–0 home victory for Capitan Figari against 29 de Septiembre in the Primera B.
