= Oskitz Estefanía =

Spanish footballer

Oskitz
Personal information
- Full name: Oskitz Estefanía Gil
- Date of birth: 12 October 1986 (age 40)
- Place of birth: Pasaia, Spain
- Height: 1.68 m (5 ft 6 in)
- Position: Forward

Youth career
- Pasaia
- 1995–2003: Real Sociedad

Senior career*
Years	Team	Apps	(Gls)
2003–2009	Real Sociedad B	88	(12)
2004–2009	Real Sociedad	4	(0)
2004–2005	→ Eibar (loan)	9	(0)
2006	→ Eibar (loan)	7	(1)
2007	→ Eldense (loan)	12	(1)
2009–2010	Écija	17	(2)
2010–2013	Arandina	44	(8)
2013–2015	Berio	7	(3)
Total		188	(27)

International career
2001–2002	Spain U16	4	(7)
2002–2003	Spain U17	8	(0)
- * Club domestic league appearances and goals

Oskitz Estefanía Gil (born 12 October 1986 in Pasaia, Gipuzkoa), known simply as Oskitz, is a Spanish former footballer who played as a forward.
