= Julio César López =

Paraguayan footballer (born 1986)

Personal information
- Date of birth: 18 April 1986 (age 40)
- Place of birth: Mariano Roque Alonso, Paraguay
- Height: 1.86 m (6 ft 1 in)
- Position: Goalkeeper

Senior career*
Years	Team	Apps	(Gls)
2006–2007	Sportivo Trinidense	8	(0)
2008–2009	2 de Mayo	40	(0)
2009–2011	San Martín de Tucumán	36	(0)
Total		84	(0)
- * Club domestic league appearances and goals

Julio César López (born 18 April 1986 in Mariano Roque Alonso) is a Paraguayan former association football goalkeeper.
