= Gerson García =

Bolivian footballer (born 1985)

Personal information
- Full name: Gerson Luis García Gálvez
- Date of birth: 24 April 1985 (age 41)
- Place of birth: Sucre, Bolivia
- Height: 1.68 m (5 ft 6 in)
- Position: Defender

Team information
- Current team: Universitario de Sucre
- Number: 14

Senior career*
Years	Team	Apps	(Gls)
2004	San José		
2005–2007	Real Potosí		
2008	San José		
2009	Real Potosí		
2010–2012	The Strongest	47	(3)
2012–2013	Jorge Wilstermann	36	(4)
2013–2014	Nacional Potosí	20	(0)
2014–2016	Petrolero	74	(1)
2017–	Universitario de Sucre	25	(0)
- * Club domestic league appearances and goals as of 25 June 2016

Gerson Luis García Gálvez (born 24 April 1985 in Sucre, Bolivia) is a Bolivian football defender who currently plays for first division team Universitario de Sucre.
