= Bondoa Adiaba =

Cameroonian football defender

Adiaba Bondoa
Personal information
- Full name: Clovis Guy Adiaba Bondoa
- Date of birth: 2 January 1987 (age 39)
- Place of birth: Douala, Cameroon Children: Achille Adiaba Bondoa, Berill Adiaba Bondoa
- Height: 1.85 m (6 ft 1 in)
- Position: Defender

Team information
- Current team: Dunajska streda

Youth career
- Vogt AC

Senior career*
Years	Team	Apps	(Gls)
2006–2007	Dreams de Douala		
2007	Cetef de Bonabéri		
2007–2008	Steel Azin	17	
2008–2010	Dunajská Streda	10	
2010–2011	→ Sparta Prague (loan)	14	

International career^{‡}
2006–2007	Cameroon U-20	7	(0)
- * Club domestic league appearances and goals as of 8 January 2014 ‡ National team caps and goals as of 11:31, 14 July 2008 (UTC)

Clovis Guy Adiaba Bondoa (born 2 January 1987) is a Cameroonian football defender who played in several teams .

== International ==
Adiaba was captain of Cameroon at the 2007 African Youth Championship.
