= Oscar Briceño =

Colombian footballer (born 1985)

Personal information
- Full name: Oscar Alberto Briceño Bueno
- Date of birth: September 6, 1985 (age 41)
- Place of birth: Cúcuta, Colombia
- Height: 1.82 m (6 ft 0 in)
- Position: Forward

Senior career*
| Years | Team | Apps | (Gls) |
| 2003–2006 | Deportes Tolima | 95 | (18) |
| 2007–2009 | Millonarios | 37 | (3) |
| 2008–2009 | → Herediano (loan) | 26 | (7) |
| 2010 | Alianza Atlético | 9 | (0) |
| 2010 | Herediano | 12 | (2) |
| 2011–2012 | Monagas SC | 31 | (5) |
| 2012–2013 | Mineros de Guayana | 18 | (3) |
| 2013–2015 | Deportivo Anzoátegui | 40 | (5) |
| 2015–2016 | Deportivo Pasto | 29 | (4) |

International career^{‡}
| 2003–2005 | Colombia Under-20 | 3 | (1) |
| 2005 | Colombia | 1 | (0) |
- * Club domestic league appearances and goals as of February 26, 2013 ‡ National team caps and goals as of February 26, 2013

Oscar Briceño (born September 6, 1985) is a Colombian retired footballer who played as a forward.

== Club career ==
Briceno started his career at Deportes Tolima in 2003, and played a few games in the 2003 Finalizacion, where Tolima won its first ever title against Deportivo Cali on penalties. He was also part of Tolima's runner-up campaign in 2006 where they lost the finals to Cúcuta Deportivo, club where his Colombia youth national team teammate Macnelly Torres played at.

In 2007, he joined Millonarios. He played the entire 2007 season with the club, including the 2007 Copa Sudamericana, and played the 2008 Apertura.

In summer 2008, he joined Herediano of Costa Rica on a one-year loan deal. He returned for the 2009 Finalizacion where he was rarely used by head coach Óscar Quintabani.

In January 2010 he moved to Peru, joining Alianza Atlético. His spell at the club was short, and in July 2010 he rejoined Herediano for the 2010–11 season. This was also a six-month spell, and in January 2011 he was on the move again, joining Monagas of Venezuela.

In August 2012 he joined Mineros de Guayana. In summer 2013 he joined Deportivo Anzoátegui, before making a return to Colombia by signing with Deportivo Pasto in 2015. He left the club after the 2016 Apertura and retired.

== International career ==
He played with the Colombia U-20 at the 2003 FIFA World Youth Championship in UAE, helping Colombia finish third by beating Argentina 2–1. He also played with the U20's at the 2005 South American U-20 Championship hosted in Colombia, and which Colombia won. He scored a goal in the group stage victory over Venezuela.

He was capped once at senior level, playing in a loss to Panama at the 2005 CONCACAF Gold Cup.

== Career statistics ==
Appearances and goals by club, season and competition
| Club | Season | League | | | Cup | | Continental | | Other | | Total | |
| Club | Season | Division | Apps | Goals | Apps | Goals | Apps | Goals | Apps | Goals | Apps | Goals |
|---|---|---|---|---|---|---|---|---|---|---|---|---|
| Millonarios | 2009 | Categoria Primera A | 5 | 0 | — | | — | | — | | 5 | 0 |
| Alianza Atletico | 2010 | Peruvian Primera Division | 8 | 0 | — | | — | | — | | 8 | 0 |
| Herediano | 2010–11 | Costa Rican Primera Division | 13 | 1 | — | | — | | — | | 13 | 1 |
| Monagas | 2010-11 | Venezuelan Primera Division | 15 | 1 | — | | — | | 2 | 0 | 17 | 1 |
| Monagas | 2011-12 | Venezuelan Primera Division | 27 | 4 | — | | — | | 3 | 1 | 30 | 5 |
| Monagas | Total | | 42 | 5 | — | | — | | 5 | 1 | 47 | 6 |
| Mineros de Guayana | 2012-13 | Venezuelan Primera Division | 18 | 3 | — | | 3 | 0 | — | | 21 | 3 |
| Deportivo Anzoategui | 2013-14 | Venezuelan Primera Division | 20 | 4 | — | | 2 | 0 | — | | 22 | 4 |
| Career total | | | 150 | 19 | 0 | 0 | 5 | 0 | 5 | 1 | 163 | 20 |

== Titles ==
=== Club ===
==== Deportes Tolima ====
- Categoria Primera A: 2003 Finalizacion

=== International ===
==== Colombia U-20 ====
- South American U-20 Championship: 2005
