= Mohamed Fornah =

Sierra Leonean international footballer

Personal information
- Full name: Mohamed Fornah
- Date of birth: November 20, 1987 (age 38)
- Place of birth: Freetown, Sierra Leone
- Position: Defender

Team information
- Current team: Perseta Tulungagung
- Number: 25

Senior career*
Years	Team	Apps	(Gls)
2005–2007	Ports Authority F.C.		
2007–2011	Cenegal FC		
2011–2014	Freetown City		
2014–	Perseta Tulungagung	3	(1)

International career^{‡}
2007–	Sierra Leone	2	(0)
- * Club domestic league appearances and goals ‡ National team caps and goals as of 4 June 2012

Mohamed Fornah (born November 20, 1987, in Freetown, Sierra Leone) is a Sierra Leonean international footballer who is a defender and is currently playing for Perseta Tulungagung in the Liga Indonesia Premier Division. He is also a member of the Sierra Leone National team. He was a member of the Sierra Under-17 squad that participated at the 2005 Mediterranean Cup in Turkey.
