= Jimmy Estacio =

Colombian footballer (born 1986)

Personal information
- Full name: Jimmy Estacio
- Date of birth: January 8, 1986 (age 40)
- Place of birth: Cali, Colombia
- Height: 6 ft 0 in (1.83 m)
- Position: Defender

Team information
- Current team: Expreso Rojo

Senior career*
Years	Team	Apps	(Gls)
2005	Deportivo Cali		
2006	Deportivo Pereira		
2007	Once Caldas		
2008	Deportivo Pasto		
2008–	Expreso Rojo		
- * Club domestic league appearances and goals as of 21:42, 20 February 2010 (UTC)

Jimmy Estacio is a Colombian footballer that plays for Expreso Rojo.

He can play as a central defender and is a starter.

He played with the Colombia national under-20 football team at the 2005 South American Youth Championship, which Colombia hosted and won. He then competed at the 2005 FIFA World Youth Championship in the Netherlands, helping Colombia to the Round of 16 before losing to eventual champion Argentina.
