= Paul Ramírez =

Venezuelan footballer (1986-2011)

Personal information
- Date of birth: 30 July 1986
- Place of birth: Caracas, Venezuela
- Date of death: 6 December 2011 (aged 25)
- Place of death: Puerto Ordaz, Venezuela
- Position: Striker

Senior career*
Years	Team	Apps	(Gls)
2003–2004	Caracas	14	(4)
2004	Juventud Antoniana	12	(7)
2004–2005	Bellinzona	10	(2)
2005–2006	Udinese	0	(0)
2006	Ascoli	0	(0)
2006–2008	Maracaibo	9	(0)
2008–2009	Minervén	3	(0)
2009–2011	CIV	7	(0)
Total		55	(13)

International career
2005	Venezuela	1	(0)
- * Club domestic league appearances and goals

Paul Ramírez (30 July 1986 – 6 December 2011) was a Venezuelan footballer who played at both professional and international levels, as a striker.

== Club career ==
Ramírez played professional club football in Venezuela, Argentina, Switzerland and Italy for Caracas, Juventud Antoniana, Bellinzona, Udinese, Ascoli, Maracaibo, Minervén and CIV.

== International career ==
He made one international appearance for Venezuela. He played for the Venezuela national under-20 football team, participating at the 2005 South American Youth Championship in Colombia.

== Death ==
Ramírez died of a renal illness on 6 December 2011, aged 25.
