= Mario Gómez (footballer, born February 1981) =

Spanish footballer

Personal information
- Full name: Mario Gómez Atanet
- Date of birth: 7 February 1981 (age 45)
- Place of birth: Madrid, Spain
- Height: 1.76 m (5 ft 9 1/2 in)
- Position: Right-back

Youth career
- Rayo Vallecano

Senior career*
Years	Team	Apps	(Gls)
2000–2001	Rayo Vallecano B		
2001–2005	Rayo Vallecano	84	(0)
2001–2002	→ Alcalá (loan)	25	(0)
2005–2007	Elche	33	(0)
2007–2009	Córdoba	24	(0)
2009–2010	Alcorcón	11	(0)
2011	Zamora	6	(0)
2012–2013	Juventud URJC		
2013–2015	Alcobendas Sport	55	(1)
Total		238	(1)

International career
1997	Spain U16	2	(1)
- * Club domestic league appearances and goals

Mario Gómez Atanet (born 7 February 1981) is a Spanish former professional footballer who played as a right-back.

== Club career ==
In his first professional seasons, Madrid-born Gómez was first choice for hometown club Rayo Vallecano, which dropped from La Liga to Segunda División B in just two years. He resumed his career in the Segunda División, but could only play second-fiddle at both Elche CF and Córdoba CF.

In the summer of 2009, Gómez returned to the third division by signing with another side from the Spanish capital, AD Alcorcón, and appeared sparingly as they promoted to the second tier for the first time ever, being subsequently released. Until the end of his career, he competed exclusively in lower league or amateur football.
