= Harrison Morales =

Colombian footballer (born 1986)

Harrison Morales Ruiz (born June 20, 1986) is a Colombian former professional footballer who played as a centre-back.

He was one of the players who took part in Colombia national under-20 football team that won the Sudamericana and went to the 2005 FIFA World Youth Championship. He also played for Colombia at the 2003 FIFA U-17 World Championship.
