= Mário Gómez (footballer, born 1986) =

Colombian footballer

Personal information
- Full name: Mário Efraín Gómez Espejero
- Date of birth: 6 March 1986 (age 40)
- Place of birth: Bogotá, Colombia
- Height: 1.68 m (5 ft 6 in)
- Position: Midfielder

Team information
- Current team: Charlotte Eagles
- Number: 11

Senior career*
| Years | Team | Apps | (Gls) |
| 2009–2012 | Santa Fe | 58 | (7) |
| 2013 | Deportivo Pasto | 8 | (0) |
| 2014– | Charlotte Eagles | 1 | (0) |
- * Club domestic league appearances and goals as of September 12, 2014

Mário Efraín Gómez Espejero (born March 6, 1986) is a Colombian footballer who plays for Charlotte Eagles in USL Pro.
