= Ruben Pereira =

Uruguayan footballer (born 1968)

Personal information
- Full name: Ruben Fabián Pereira Márquez
- Date of birth: 28 January 1968 (age 58)
- Place of birth: Montevideo, Uruguay
- Height: 1.79 m (5 ft 10 in)
- Position: Midfielder

Senior career*
| Years | Team | Apps | (Gls) |
| 1986–1991 | Danubio | 82 | (11) |
| 1992 | Cremonese | 13 | (0) |
| 1992–1993 | Boca Juniors | 16 | (0) |
| 1993–1994 | Nacional | | |
| 1994–1998 | Peñarol | | |

International career
| 1988–1996 | Uruguay | 27 | (1) |
- * Club domestic league appearances and goals

Ruben Fabián Pereira Márquez (born 28 January 1968 in Montevideo) is a Uruguayan former footballer.

== International career ==
Pereira made 27 appearances for the senior Uruguay national football team from 1988 to 1996, including two appearances at the 1990 FIFA World Cup finals. He also played in the 1989 Copa América.
