= Sebastián Montesinos =

Chilean footballer (born 1986)

Personal information
- Full name: Sebastián Francisco Javier Montesinos Pezoa
- Date of birth: 12 March 1986 (age 40)
- Place of birth: Santiago, Chile
- Height: 1.84 m (6 ft 1/2 in)
- Position: Defender

Youth career
- 1999–2004: Colo-Colo

Senior career*
Years	Team	Apps	(Gls)
2005–2006	Colo-Colo	0	(0)
2006	→ Curicó Unido (loan)	14	(0)
2007	Deportes Puerto Montt	8	(0)
2007	Deportes Concepción	11	(0)
2008	San Marcos	32	(0)
2009	Cobreloa	16	(2)
2010	Everton	28	(3)
2011–2014	Ñublense	71	(5)
2015–2016	Barnechea	28	(3)

International career
2005	Chile U20	3	(0)

Managerial career
- 2016: Colo-Colo (youth)
- * Club domestic league appearances and goals

Sebastián Francisco Javier Montesinos Pezoa (born 12 March 1986) is a Chilean former footballer who played as a centre-back.

== Career ==
Montesinos joined the Colo-Colo youth ranks at the age of 13. At senior level, he was loaned out to Curicó Unido in 2006, with whom he made his professional debut.

His last team was then Primera B side A.C. Barnechea.

== Post-retirement ==
Montesinos graduated as a football instructor while playing for Cobreloa and worked for a Colo-Colo academy based in Curacaví after his retirement for about six months.

Disenchanted with football, Montesinos switched to administrative work.
