= Patrick Bantamoi =

Sierra Leonean footballer

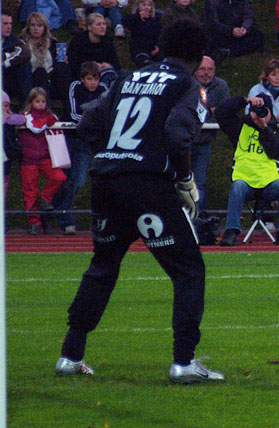
- Patrick Bantamoi KuPS vs MIFK in Åland Finland in 2005

Personal information
- Date of birth: 24 May 1986 (age 40)
- Place of birth: Serabu, Sierra Leone
- Height: 1.88 m (6 ft 2 in)
- Position: Goalkeeper

Senior career*
Years	Team	Apps	(Gls)
2004–2006	KuPS	31	(0)
2007–2011	Inter Turku	75	(0)
2011	Telstar	0	(0)
2014	FC Espoo	0	(0)
2014	→ FC Viikingit (loan)	7	(0)
2014	RoPS	3	(0)
2015	FC Viikingit	2	(0)

International career
2002-2003	Sierra Leone U17	12	(0)
- * Club domestic league appearances and goals

Patrick Bantamoi (born 24 May 1986) is a Sierra Leonean-Finnish former professional footballer who played as a goalkeeper.

== Club career ==
Bantamoi was born and raised in Bo, in the southern region of Sierra Leone. Discovered while playing in a local street football tournament in Bo in 2002, he was soon aggregated to the national under-17 squad. The following year, he took part in the FIFA U-17 World Championship in Finland: however, shortly before the representative flew back to Sierra Leone, Bantamoi and several other players, including future senior international Medo Kamara, escaped from their accommodation and defected.

Both Bantamoi and Kamara were between the players who successfully applied for political asylum (and, later on, were granted Finnish citizenship), although they had to wait until their 18th birthday to become eligible to play professional football. Once he turned 18, Bantamoi signed his first professional contract with Finnish club KuPS, playing in the second tier of the local football system: the Ykkönen.

Although he was mainly a reserve during his first stances in Kuopio, in 2004 the team immediately won promotion to Finnish top tier Veikkausliiga, while in the following season they finished 10th out of 14 teams, being 12 points over the relegation zone. On 31 July 2005, the Sierra Leonean made his debut in the top-flight league, playing in a goalless away draw against Tampere United.

Between 2005 and 2006 (also the year he and Kamara played together once more), Bantamoi established himself as the starting goalkeeper and was soon considered to be one of the league's best players in his position. However, 2006 was also a contrasting year for KuPS: they won the Finnish League Cup title, with the Sierra Leonean himself being deemed as the tournament's best player, but also finished last in the league, thus getting relegated to the Ykkönen again.

Following the relegation with KuPS and the club's financial and managerial turbulence, in December 2006 Bantamoi transferred to fellow Veikkausliiga club FC Inter Turku, penning a two-year deal with an optional clause for a third year.

At his new club, Bantamoi quickly became the first-choice goalkeeper, thus taking part in Inter Turku's successful period during 2007 and 2009: after losing the Liigacup to FC Lahti after the penalties in 2007, the following year the club didn't only succeed in the competition (beating TPS in the final), but also won the Veikkausliga title. In this last occasion, Bantamoi was also awarded as the league's Best Goalkeeper of the Year.

In 2009, the Sierra Leonean could add some bits of continental experience to his career when he and Inter Turku were granted access to the second qualification round of the UEFA Champions League, although they were immediately eliminated by Moldovan side Sheriff Tiraspol, following a double 1-0 loss. However, during the 2010 season, Bantamoi featured for the Finnish side less and less, eventually losing his place in the starting XI to Janne Korhonen. At the start of 2011, he left the club, having collected a total amount of 106 league appearances in the Veikkausliiga (31 with KuPS, 75 with Inter Turku).

On 28 January of the same year, Bantamoi was signed by Dutch team Telstar, playing in the local second tier, for the remainder of the season. However, he never featured for the Witte Leeuwen, with the starting spot between the sticks being held by Cor Varkevisser. At the end of the season, Bantamoi left Telstar and became a free agent.

In 2014, after two years and a half of inactivity, the Sierra Leonean returned to Finland to sign with FC Espoo, who had recently won promotion to the Kakkonen, third level of the local football system. However, as he didn't make a single appearance for the club, in June he was sent on loan to second-tier side FC Viikingit. Although this spell proved to be extremely short, as it lasted just two months, Bantamoi managed to feature seven times between the sticks for the Viikkarit. However, his side suffered relegation as they finished at the bottom of the league table, with just 6 points, one single win, 19 goals scored and a whopping 81 conceded (17 of which by the Sierra Leonean himself).

His "home team" Espoo eventually relegated, too, so Bantamoi decided to make his third move of 2014, joining Veikkausliiga side RoPs on a free transfer for the rest of the season. Mainly used as a reserve for Saku-Pekka Sahlgren, he still made three appearances for the Rovaniemi-based team, but then parted ways with the club at the end of the season. He remained a free agent until August 2015, before returning once more to Viikingit, this time in the Kakkonen, but after just a couple of appearances for the team he announced his retire.

== International career ==
In 2003, Bantamoi was chosen as the first-choice goalkeeper for Sierra Leone's under-17 squad both at the African U-17 Championship in Swaziland, where the Leone Stars achieved their best result ever by reaching the final (eventually lost to Cameroon), and the FIFA U-17 World Championship in Finland, where they finished last in their group, having collected just one point from a 3-3 draw against Spain, and were consequently eliminated from the tournament.

Despite being eligible both for Sierra Leone and Finland (having obtained its citizenship), Bantamoi never won a senior international cap, neither with the former country, nor with the latter. However, he received a call-up for the Leone Stars in 2014, when he featured on the bench in both the matches against Cameroon (on 10 and 15 October, respectively), regarding the qualification round to the 2015 African Cup of Nations in Equatorial Guinea.

== Personal life ==
In 2009, according to the local nationality laws, Bantamoi was granted Finnish citizenship, and later became part of the national association for footballers.

Throughout the years, he supported the poor and the underprivileged kids and adolescents in Sierra Leone by sending essential football equipment (including balls, goalkeeping gloves, jerseys and shoes) to some local academies and centers.

For these efforts, in 2020 he was nominated for the FIFPro Merit Awards, three special prizes assigned to the footballers who distinguished themselves the most for their impact out of the playing field and their activism.

== Honours ==
KuPS

- Finnish League Cup: 2006

Inter Turku

- Veikkausliiga: 2008
- Finnish League Cup: 2008
- Finnish League Cup runners-up: 2007

Individual

- Finnish League Cup Best Player: 2006
- Finnish All Star Game Best Player (unofficial): 2007
- Veikkausliiga Goalkeeper of the Year: 2008
