= Nelson Sossa =

Bolivian footballer (born 1986)

Personal information
- Full name: Nelson Sossa Chávez
- Date of birth: March 14, 1986 (age 40)
- Place of birth: La Paz, Bolivia
- Height: 1.72 m (5 ft 7 1/2 in)
- Position: Striker

Team information
- Current team: San José

Senior career*
Years	Team	Apps	(Gls)
2004–2008	Wilstermann	121	(34)
2009–2010	Aurora	27	(12)
2010–2011	Wilstermann	12	(5)
2011– 2012	Real Potosí	12	(5)
2012– 2013	Nacional Potosí	11	(3)
2014–	San José	25	(6)

International career^{‡}
2006–	Bolivia	5	(1)
- * Club domestic league appearances and goals as of September 14, 2009 ‡ National team caps and goals as of 2 December 2009

Nelson Sossa Chávez (born March 14, 1986, in La Paz) is a Bolivian football striker who currently plays in the Liga de Fútbol Profesional Boliviano for Real Potosí.

Sossa began playing professional football in 2004 when club Jorge Wilstermann promoted him from its youth sector. After five successful years playing for the aviadores he was transferred to fierce rival Aurora, which was in need of talented players to face the 2009 edition of Copa Libertadores.

== Bolivia national team ==
Sossa has capped for the Bolivia national team in three games with one goal scored. He was also a member of the Bolivian squad during Copa America 2007.
