= Abel Aguilar =

Colombian footballer (born 1985)

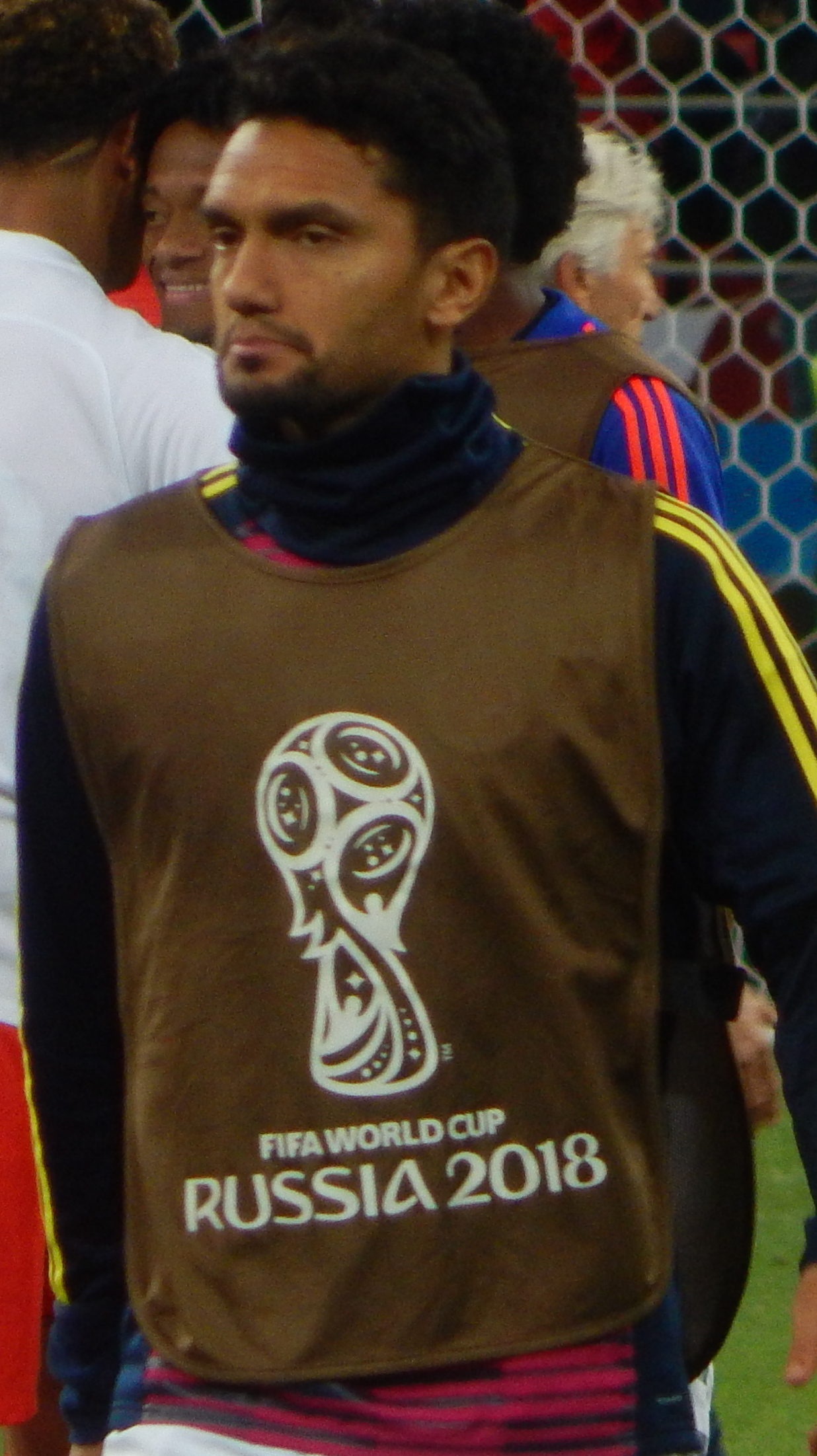
- Aguilar with Colombia at the 2018 World Cup

Personal information
- Full name: Abel Enrique Aguilar Tapias
- Date of birth: 6 January 1985 (age 41)
- Place of birth: Bogotá, Colombia
- Height: 1.85 m (6 ft 1 in)
- Position: Midfielder

Senior career*
Years	Team	Apps	(Gls)
2002–2005	Deportivo Cali	102	(3)
2005–2010	Udinese	2	(0)
2005	→ Ascoli (loan)	0	(0)
2007–2008	→ Xerez (loan)	48	(3)
2008–2009	→ Hércules (loan)	34	(9)
2009–2010	→ Zaragoza (loan)	27	(4)
2010–2013	Hércules	73	(4)
2012–2013	→ Deportivo La Coruña (loan)	28	(3)
2013–2016	Toulouse	49	(1)
2015–2016	Toulouse B	3	(0)
2016	Belenenses	9	(1)
2016–2018	Deportivo Cali	55	(1)
2018	FC Dallas	4	(0)
2019	Unión Magdalena	41	(4)
Total		475	(33)

International career
2003–2005	Colombia U20	9	(2)
2004–2018	Colombia	71	(7)
Medal record
Men's football
Representing Colombia
South American Youth Football Championship
Winner	2005 Colombia
- * Club domestic league appearances and goals

Abel Enrique Aguilar Tapias (born 6 January 1985) is a Colombian former professional footballer who played as a central or defensive midfielder.

Having started his career at Deportivo Cali, Aguilar signed with Italian club Udinese at the age of 20 then spent seven seasons in Spanish football with four teams, appearing in La Liga for Zaragoza, Hércules and Deportivo. He also competed in France, Portugal and the United States.

A Colombian international since 2004, Aguilar represented the nation in two World Cups and as many Copa América tournaments while playing 71 matches.

== Club career ==
=== Italy ===
Aguilar was born in Bogotá. Serie A club Udinese Calcio bought his rights in the summer of 2005, from local Deportivo Cali, and loaned him immediately to fellow league team Ascoli Calcio 1898 FC due to the excess of foreign players in the roster; however, after some problems in the arrival of the transfer, the player missed pre-season training, only joining it a month into the season.

Aguilar returned to Udinese in January 2006, after having never played for Ascoli, but received few playing opportunities in the following months (two league matches and the UEFA Cup 1–0 loss at RC Lens, all incomplete).

=== Spain ===
For the following three years, Aguilar was also loaned, always in the Spanish second division. He started out in January 2007 at Xerez CD, where he remained until the end of the 2007–08 campaign, always as first choice.

In 2008–09, Aguilar represented Hércules CF, being a permanent fixture as the Alicante side fell three points short of a return to La Liga. On 24 July 2009 he was again loaned, now to Real Zaragoza, which in turn promoted to the top flight; he made his debut in the competition on 29 August, starting and playing 71 minutes in a 1–0 home win against CD Tenerife, and scored all his four league goals during the first two months of competition.

Aguilar was released by Udinese in July 2010, immediately signing a four-year contract with former club Hércules, returned to the top division after an absence of 13 years. He appeared in 34 scoreless games during the season, which ended in relegation.

Aguilar returned to the Spanish top tier in the 2012–13 campaign, being loaned to Deportivo de La Coruña. He netted twice in just his second league appearance to help to a 3–3 draw at Valencia CF, but his team was again eventually relegated.

=== Toulouse ===
On 22 August 2013, Aguilar agreed to a three-year deal with Toulouse FC. His maiden appearance in Ligue 1 occurred nine days later, putting on an average performance and being booked in a 2–1 away loss to SC Bastia.

Aguilar spent his third year in France on the sidelines, nursing a serious ankle injury. In the very last moments of the 2016 January transfer window, he joined C.F. Os Belenenses from Portugal.

=== Return home ===
On 12 June 2016, after 11 years playing in Europe, Aguilar returned to his country and Deportivo Cali, signing a three-year contract. He scored his first goal for the team on 29 July, in the 2–1 victory over América de Cali in the Copa Colombia.

=== FC Dallas ===
On 27 August 2018, Aguilar joined Major League Soccer side FC Dallas. At the end of the season, he was released.

=== Unión Magdalena ===
Aged 33, Aguilar returned to his country in December 2018, agreeing to a deal at Unión Magdalena for the upcoming season. On 18 February 2020, he announced his retirement.

== International career ==
Aguilar was captain of the Colombia national team at under-17 and under-20 levels. He rose to stardom as leader of the latter side that finished third at the 2003 FIFA World Youth Championship.

Aguilar was then promoted to the senior squad for the 2004 Copa América held in Peru. There, he scored two goals, helping his country to the semi-finals.

Subsequently, Aguilar returned to the under-20 (again as captain), helping them to a first-place finish at the 2005 South American Youth Cup with the consequent qualification for the World Championship of the category in the Netherlands. After helping the national team to three group-stage wins, he could not prevent a round-of-16 2–1 ousting at the ends of Argentina.

Aguilar was selected by José Pekerman for his 2014 FIFA World Cup squad. He played his first-ever game in the tournament on 14 June, starting in a 3–0 group stage win against Greece which was also his 50th cap.

Aguilar was also picked for the 2018 World Cup in Russia.

== Career statistics ==
=== International ===
Colombia
Year	Apps	Goals
2004	7	2
2005	5	2
2006	0	0
2007	0	0
2008	1	0
2009	7	0
2010	2	0
2011	9	0
2012	2	0
2013	11	1
2014	9	0
2015	2	1
2016	3	1
2017	10	0
2018	3	0
Total	71	7

Scores and results list Colombia's goal tally first, score column indicates score after each Aguilar goal.

#	Date	Venue	Opponent	Score	Result	Competition
1.	12 July 2004	Estadio Mansiche, Trujillo, Peru	Peru	2–1	2–2	2004 Copa América
2.	17 July 2004	Estadio Mansiche, Trujillo, Peru	Costa Rica	1–0	2–0	2004 Copa América
3.	12 July 2005	Orange Bowl, Miami, United States	Trinidad and Tobago	2–1	2–1	2005 CONCACAF Gold Cup
4.	17 July 2005	Reliant Stadium, Houston, United States	Mexico	2–1	2–1	2005 CONCACAF Gold Cup
5.	6 February 2013	Sun Life, Miami Gardens, United States	Guatemala	3–0	4–1	Friendly
6.	30 March 2015	Mohammed Bin Zayed, Abu Dhabi, United Arab Emirates	Kuwait	1–0	3–1	Friendly
7.	11 October 2016	Metropolitano Roberto Meléndez, Barranquilla, Colombia	Uruguay	1–0	2–2	2018 World Cup qualification
