= 2002 UEFA European Under-17 Championship squads =

Football tournament squads

Those marked in bold have later been capped at full International level.

== Group A ==
=== Denmark ===
Head coach: Hans Brun Larsen

No.	Pos.	Player	Date of birth (age)	Caps	Club
1	GK	Kasper Ambrosen	9 January 1985 (aged 17)		(Denmark) Brøndby
2	DF	Henrik Kildentoft	18 March 1985 (aged 17)		(Denmark) Brøndby
3	DF	Jonas Troest	4 March 1985 (aged 17)		(Denmark) B.93
4	DF	Anders Kure	12 September 1985 (aged 16)		(Denmark) AGF
5	DF	**Dennis Cagara**	19 February 1985 (aged 17)		(Denmark) Brøndby
6	MF	**Niki Zimling**	19 April 1985 (aged 17)		(Denmark) Brøndby
7	MF	**William Kvist**	24 February 1985 (aged 17)		(Denmark) KB
8	MF	Jeppe Brandrup	3 June 1985 (aged 16)		(Denmark) KB
9	FW	**Morten Rasmussen**	31 January 1985 (aged 17)		(Denmark) AGF
10	MF	**Kasper Lorentzen**	19 November 1985 (aged 16)		(Denmark) Brøndby
11	FW	**Johan Absalonsen**	16 September 1985 (aged 16)		(Denmark) B 1913
12	MF	Morten Duelund Hansen	26 January 1985 (aged 17)		(Denmark) AGF
13	DF	**Michael Jakobsen**	2 January 1986 (aged 16)		(Denmark) B.93
14	MF	Rune Hansen	6 April 1985 (aged 17)		(Denmark) AGF
15	MF	Lasse Mønster Hansen	2 February 1985 (aged 17)		(Denmark) B 1913
16	GK	Jesper Hansen	31 March 1985 (aged 17)		(Denmark) Nordsjælland
17	MF	Rune Rasmussen Lind	3 April 1985 (aged 17)		(Denmark) Esbjerg
18	FW	Morten Friis Jensen	6 April 1985 (aged 17)		(Denmark) Esbjerg

=== England ===
Head coach: Dick Bate

No.	Pos.	Player	Date of birth (age)	Caps	Club
1	GK	Steven Drench	11 September 1985 (aged 16)		(England) Blackburn Rovers
2	DF	James Biggins	6 June 1985 (aged 16)		(England) Nottingham Forest
3	DF	Gary Borrowdale	16 July 1985 (aged 16)		(England) Crystal Palace
4	MF	Ross Gardner	15 December 1985 (aged 16)		(England) Newcastle United
5	DF	David Raven	10 March 1985 (aged 17)		(England) Liverpool
6	DF	Chris Hogg	13 March 1985 (aged 17)		(England) Ipswich Town
7	FW	Wayne Routledge	7 January 1985 (aged 17)		(England) Crystal Palace
8	MF	Lee Croft	21 June 1985 (aged 16)		(England) Manchester City
9	FW	**Wayne Rooney**	24 October 1985 (aged 16)		(England) Everton
10	FW	Stacy Long	11 January 1985 (aged 17)		(England) Charlton Athletic
11	FW	Mark Smyth	9 January 1985 (aged 17)		(England) Liverpool
12	DF	Mat Sadler	26 February 1985 (aged 17)		(England) Birmingham City
13	GK	Nicky Eyre	7 September 1985 (aged 16)		(England) Tottenham Hotspur
14	MF	David Mannix	24 September 1985 (aged 16)		(England) Liverpool
15	MF	Tom Groves	18 July 1985 (aged 16)		(England) Nottingham Forest
16	MF	Scott Brown	8 May 1985 (aged 16)		(England) Everton
17	FW	Dorryl Proffitt	2 May 1985 (aged 16)		(England) Manchester City
18	FW	Sean Doherty	10 February 1985 (aged 17)		(England) Fulham

=== Finland ===
Head coach: Timo Liekoski

No.	Pos.	Player	Date of birth (age)	Caps	Club
1	GK	Ville Iiskola	26 April 1985 (aged 17)		(Finland) FC Kuusankoski
2	FW	Jani Koivisto	25 February 1985 (aged 17)		(Finland) HJK
3	MF	Eero Salminen	16 January 1985 (aged 17)		(Finland) MuSa
4	DF	Ville Lehtonen	6 February 1985 (aged 17)		(France) Metz
5	FW	**Hermanni Vuorinen**	27 January 1985 (aged 17)		(Finland) Jazz
6	FW	**Mika Ääritalo**	25 July 1985 (aged 16)		(Finland) TPS
7	MF	Vili Savolainen	25 October 1985 (aged 16)		(Finland) HJK
8	MF	Jarkko Vähäsarja	13 March 1985 (aged 17)		(Finland) HJK
9	MF	Marko Kolsi	20 January 1985 (aged 17)		(Finland) Jokerit
10	DF	**Niklas Moisander**	29 September 1985 (aged 16)		(Finland) TPS
11	MF	Otto-Pekka Jurvainen	1 February 1985 (aged 17)		(Finland) HJK
12	GK	**Henrik Moisander**	29 September 1985 (aged 16)		(Finland) TPS
13	DF	Jyri Kallio	12 October 1985 (aged 16)		(Finland) TPS
14	FW	Marko Huttu	9 March 1985 (aged 17)		(Finland) Sepsi-78
15	DF	Jukka-Pekka Tuomanen	4 December 1985 (aged 16)		(Finland) LoPa
16	MF	Matti Lähitie	13 February 1985 (aged 17)		(Finland) Jazz
17	DF	Tomi Visuri	5 February 1985 (aged 17)		(Finland) YPA
18	MF	Mika Mäkitalo	12 June 1985 (aged 16)		(Finland) Inter Turku

=== Netherlands ===
Head coach: Ruud Kaiser

No.	Pos.	Player	Date of birth (age)	Caps	Club
1	GK	Theo Brack	10 February 1985 (aged 17)		(Netherlands) Vitesse
2	DF	Timothy Cathalina	24 January 1985 (aged 17)		(Netherlands) Twente
3	MF	Mark van den Boogaart	3 September 1985 (aged 16)		(Netherlands) Feyenoord
4	DF	Ferne Snoyl	8 March 1985 (aged 17)		(Netherlands) Feyenoord
5	DF	Wouter Artz	14 March 1985 (aged 17)		(Netherlands) Feyenoord
6	MF	**Hedwiges Maduro**	13 February 1985 (aged 17)		(Netherlands) Ajax
7	MF	Resham Sardar	3 June 1985 (aged 16)		(Netherlands) Feyenoord
8	MF	Richard Blonk	22 December 1985 (aged 16)		(Netherlands) Feyenoord
9	FW	**Collins John**	17 October 1985 (aged 16)		(Netherlands) Twente
10	MF	**Otman Bakkal**	27 February 1985 (aged 17)		(Netherlands) PSV
11	FW	Admir Haznadar	25 July 1985 (aged 16)		(Netherlands) PSV
12	DF	**Dwight Tiendalli**	21 October 1985 (aged 16)		(Netherlands) Ajax
13	DF	Mark Otten	2 September 1985 (aged 16)		(Netherlands) NEC
14	MF	Tom Daemen	17 June 1985 (aged 16)		(Netherlands) Fortuna Sittard
15	MF	Ferdi Elmas	13 February 1985 (aged 17)		(Netherlands) Ajax
16	GK	Sten Dreezen	22 February 1985 (aged 17)		(Netherlands) Fortuna Sittard
17	FW	Rick Kruys	5 July 1985 (aged 16)		(Netherlands) Utrecht
18	FW	Joris van Rooijen	11 March 1985 (aged 17)		(Netherlands) Utrecht

== Group B ==
=== France ===
Head coach: Luc Rabat

No.	Pos.	Player	Date of birth (age)	Caps	Club
1	GK	Benoît Benvegnu	18 January 1985 (aged 17)		(France) Toulouse
2	DF	Karim Azizou	20 January 1985 (aged 17)		(France) Bordeaux
3	DF	Guillaume Rippert	30 April 1985 (aged 16)		(France) Nantes
4	DF	**Carl Medjani**	15 May 1985 (aged 16)		(France) Saint-Étienne
5	MF	**Yoann Folly**	6 June 1985 (aged 16)		(France) Saint-Étienne
6	MF	Guillaume Plessis	16 January 1985 (aged 17)		(France) Lens
7	FW	**Jimmy Briand**	2 August 1985 (aged 16)		(France) Rennes
8	MF	Cédric Kisamba	25 January 1985 (aged 17)		(France) Auxerre
9	FW	Seïd Khiter	19 January 1985 (aged 17)		(France) Lens
10	MF	Samy Houri	9 August 1985 (aged 16)		(France) Saint-Étienne
11	FW	Kevin Lejeune	22 January 1985 (aged 17)		(France) Auxerre
12	DF	Thomas Alexandre	14 April 1985 (aged 17)		(France) Lens
13	DF	**Gaël Clichy**	16 July 1985 (aged 16)		(France) Cannes
14	MF	**Jonathan Bru**	2 May 1985 (aged 16)		(France) Rennes
15	DF	**Ronald Zubar**	20 September 1985 (aged 16)		(France) Caen
16	GK	Aléxis Thébaux	17 March 1985 (aged 17)		(France) Nantes
17	FW	Christophe Mandanne	28 July 1985 (aged 16)		(France) Le Havre
18	DF	Rodolphe Kbidi	28 May 1985 (aged 16)		(France) Paris Saint-Germain

=== Portugal ===
Head coach: Francisco Alberto Barceló Silveira Ramos

No.	Pos.	Player	Date of birth (age)	Caps	Club
1	GK	Christopher	29 March 1985 (aged 17)		(Portugal) Sporting CP
2	DF	Gualter Bilro	22 November 1985 (aged 16)		(Portugal) Porto
3	DF	Pedro Araújo	10 January 1985 (aged 17)		(Portugal) Sporting CP
4	DF	André Carvalho	12 March 1985 (aged 17)		(Portugal) Porto
5	DF	José Semedo	11 January 1985 (aged 17)		(Portugal) Sporting CP
6	MF	Fernando Alexandre	2 August 1985 (aged 16)		(Portugal) Benfica
7	FW	**Cristiano Ronaldo**	5 February 1985 (aged 17)		(Portugal) Sporting CP
8	MF	João Vilela	9 September 1985 (aged 16)		(Portugal) Benfica
9	FW	**Tiquinho**	14 July 1985 (aged 16)		(Portugal) Benfica
10	MF	Nélson Santos	7 March 1985 (aged 17)		(Portugal) Boavista
11	FW	Ricardo Costa	16 January 1985 (aged 17)		(Portugal) Porto
12	GK	Rui Sacramento	31 January 1985 (aged 17)		(Portugal) Porto
13	MF	Wilson Sanches Leal	15 April 1985 (aged 17)		(France) Cannes
14	DF	Steven Silva	12 February 1985 (aged 17)		(Portugal) Boavista
15	MF	João Coimbra	24 May 1986 (aged 15)		(Portugal) Benfica
16	DF	Bruno Simão	5 May 1985 (aged 16)		(Portugal) Belenenses
17	FW	**Ivanildo Cassamá**	9 January 1986 (aged 16)		(Portugal) Porto
18	MF	Diogo Andrade	23 July 1985 (aged 16)		(Portugal) Belenenses

=== Switzerland ===
Head coach: Markus Frei

No.	Pos.	Player	Date of birth (age)	Caps	Club
1	GK	Swen König	3 September 1985 (aged 16)		(Switzerland) Aarau
2	DF	**Tranquillo Barnetta**	22 May 1985 (aged 16)		(Switzerland) St. Gallen
3	DF	Arnaud Bühler	17 January 1985 (aged 17)		(Switzerland) Lausanne-Sports
4	DF	Henri Siqueira	15 January 1985 (aged 17)		(Switzerland) Grasshopper
5	DF	**Philippe Senderos**	14 February 1985 (aged 17)		(Switzerland) Servette
6	MF	Yann Verdon	11 February 1985 (aged 17)		(Switzerland) Lausanne-Sports
7	DF	Marko Milosavac	19 October 1985 (aged 16)		(Switzerland) Zürich
8	FW	Goran Antić	4 July 1985 (aged 16)		(Switzerland) Basel
9	DF	**Reto Ziegler**	16 January 1986 (aged 16)		(Switzerland) Grasshopper
10	MF	Jesús Torres Mimbrera	16 July 1986 (aged 15)		(Switzerland) Sion
11	MF	Boban Maksimović	10 October 1985 (aged 16)		(Switzerland) Young Boys
12	GK	Diego Würmli	13 September 1985 (aged 16)		(Switzerland) Zürich
13	MF	Giona Preisig	9 March 1985 (aged 17)		(Switzerland) Lausanne-Sports
14	MF	**Sandro Burki**	16 September 1985 (aged 16)		(Switzerland) Zürich
15	FW	Marco Schneuwly	27 March 1985 (aged 17)		(Switzerland) Fribourg
16	DF	Michael Diethelm	24 January 1985 (aged 17)		(Switzerland) Luzern
17	DF	Stefan Iten	5 February 1985 (aged 17)		(Switzerland) Grasshopper
18	FW	Christian Schlauri	30 March 1985 (aged 17)		(Switzerland) Winterthur

=== Ukraine ===
Head coach: Pavlo Yakovenko

No.	Pos.	Player	Date of birth (age)	Caps	Club
1	GK	Oleksiy Prokhorov	4 March 1985 (aged 17)		(Ukraine) Dynamo Kyiv
2	DF	Ihor Chuchman	15 February 1985 (aged 17)		(Ukraine) Borysfen Boryspil
3	DF	Olexandr Polunitskyy	16 January 1985 (aged 17)		(Ukraine) Dynamo Kyiv
4	DF	Denys Khomenko	10 January 1985 (aged 17)		(Ukraine) Dynamo Kyiv
5	DF	**Hryhoriy Yarmash**	4 January 1985 (aged 17)		(Ukraine) Dynamo Kyiv
6	MF	Oleksandr Sytnyk	2 January 1985 (aged 17)		(Ukraine) Dynamo Kyiv
7	DF	Andriy Proshyn	19 February 1985 (aged 17)		(Ukraine) Borysfen Boryspil
8	MF	**Oleksandr Aliyev**	3 February 1985 (aged 17)		(Ukraine) Borysfen Boryspil
9	MF	**Oleksandr Maksymov**	13 February 1985 (aged 17)		(Ukraine) Borysfen Boryspil
10	FW	Denys Adleyba	20 September 1985 (aged 16)		(Ukraine) Dynamo Kyiv
11	FW	Ivan Kotenko	28 April 1985 (aged 16)		(Ukraine) Borysfen Boryspil
12	GK	Leonid Musin	19 April 1985 (aged 17)		(Ukraine) Dynamo Kyiv
13	MF	Yuriy Kholopkin	23 February 1985 (aged 17)		(Ukraine) Dynamo Kyiv
14	DF	Andriy Kozhedub	2 February 1985 (aged 17)		(Ukraine) Dynamo Kyiv
15	MF	Viacheslav Lytvynenko	20 January 1985 (aged 17)		(Ukraine) Dynamo Kyiv
16	FW	Dmytro Vorobey	10 May 1985 (aged 16)		(Ukraine) Borysfen Boryspil
17	FW	Volodymyr Samborskiy	29 August 1985 (aged 16)		(Ukraine) Borysfen Boryspil
18	DF	Anatoliy Kitsuta	22 December 1985 (aged 16)		(Ukraine) Borysfen Boryspil

== Group C ==
=== Czech Republic ===
Head coach: Roman Pucelik

No.	Pos.	Player	Date of birth (age)	Caps	Club
1	GK	Tomáš Černý	10 April 1985 (aged 17)		(Czech Republic) Sigma Olomouc
2	DF	Radim Kopecký	7 June 1985 (aged 16)		(Czech Republic) Sigma Olomouc
3	DF	Aleš Neuwirth	4 January 1985 (aged 17)		(Czech Republic) Baník Ostrava
4	DF	Roman Švrček	23 April 1985 (aged 17)		(Czech Republic) Baník Ostrava
5	DF	Tomás Bursa	23 March 1985 (aged 17)		(Czech Republic) Zlín
6	MF	Michal Kropik	20 February 1985 (aged 17)		(Czech Republic) Sparta Prague
7	MF	Zdeněk Látal	5 October 1985 (aged 16)		(Czech Republic) Brno
8	FW	Adam Varadi	30 April 1985 (aged 16)		(Czech Republic) Baník Ostrava
9	FW	**Michal Papadopulos**	14 April 1985 (aged 17)		(Czech Republic) Baník Ostrava
10	MF	Petr Kobylík	8 May 1985 (aged 16)		(Czech Republic) Sigma Olomouc
11	FW	Richard Husovský	16 March 1985 (aged 17)		(Czech Republic) Baník Ostrava
12	DF	Vit Paszto	2 February 1985 (aged 17)		(Czech Republic) Sigma Olomouc
13	MF	Zdeněk Staněk	6 July 1985 (aged 16)		(Czech Republic) Baník Ostrava
14	FW	Pavel Malchárek	16 February 1986 (aged 16)		(Czech Republic) Vítkovice
15	MF	Marek Penkava	24 January 1985 (aged 17)		(Czech Republic) Teplice
16	GK	Aleš Hruška	23 November 1985 (aged 16)		(Czech Republic) Sparta Prague
17	MF	Vojtěch Štěpán	8 June 1985 (aged 16)		(Czech Republic) Sigma Olomouc
18	FW	Jan Mokrejs	2 January 1985 (aged 17)		(Czech Republic) Zlín

=== Moldova ===
Head coach: Petru Efros

No.	Pos.	Player	Date of birth (age)	Caps	Club
1	GK	**Andrian Negai**	28 January 1985 (aged 17)		(Moldova) Liceul Sportiv Chișinău
2	DF	Nicolae Orlovschi	1 April 1985 (aged 17)		(Moldova) Olimpia Bălți
3	DF	Alexandru Vlasov	1 January 1985 (aged 17)		(Moldova) Sheriff Tiraspol
4	MF	**Simeon Bulgaru**	26 May 1985 (aged 16)		(Moldova) Zimbru Chișinău
5	DF	Vladimir Ursu	8 January 1985 (aged 17)		(Moldova) Vite-Auto Chișinău
6	MF	Dmitri Melceacov	14 September 1985 (aged 16)		(Moldova) Sheriff Tiraspol
7	DF	**Alexandru Epureanu**	27 September 1986 (aged 15)		(Moldova) Zimbru Chișinău
8	FW	**Victor Bulat**	5 January 1985 (aged 17)		(Moldova) Sheriff Tiraspol
9	FW	**Denis Calincov**	15 September 1985 (aged 16)		(Moldova) Zimbru Chișinău
10	FW	**Maxim Franțuz**	4 May 1986 (aged 15)		(Moldova) Zimbru Chișinău
11	FW	Alexandru Zislis	14 March 1986 (aged 16)		(Moldova) Ciocana Chișinău
12	GK	Ghenadie Moșneaga	25 April 1985 (aged 17)		(Moldova) Buiucani Chișinău
13	DF	Anatolie Boeștean	26 March 1985 (aged 17)		(Moldova) Zimbru Chișinău
14	FW	Tudor Vlaicu	3 March 1985 (aged 17)		(Moldova) Zimbru Chișinău
15	DF	Vitalie Chișca	19 June 1985 (aged 16)		(Moldova) ȘS 11 Chișinău
16	FW	Alexandru Lujanschi	4 September 1985 (aged 16)		(Moldova) Sheriff Tiraspol
17	FW	Andrei Cara	25 March 1985 (aged 17)		(Moldova) Vite-Auto Chișinău
18	MF	Marian Berezovschi	14 August 1986 (aged 15)		(Moldova) Ciocana Chișinău

=== Spain ===
Head coach: Juan Santisteban

No.	Pos.	Player	Date of birth (age)	Caps	Club
1	GK	Nauzet Pérez	1 March 1985 (aged 17)		(Spain) Las Palmas
2	DF	José Antonio Llamas	28 February 1985 (aged 17)		(Spain) Barcelona
3	DF	Javier Garrido	15 March 1985 (aged 17)		(Spain) Real Sociedad
4	DF	Miquel Robusté	20 May 1985 (aged 16)		(Spain) Espanyol
5	DF	Alexis	4 August 1985 (aged 16)		(Spain) Málaga
6	MF	José Luis Merino	5 March 1985 (aged 17)		(Spain) Real Oviedo
7	MF	David Corominas	29 September 1985 (aged 16)		(Spain) Barcelona
8	FW	Aitor Martínez	10 January 1985 (aged 17)		(Spain) Barcelona
9	FW	Jonathan Soriano	24 September 1985 (aged 16)		(Spain) Espanyol
10	MF	Jaime Gavilán	12 May 1985 (aged 16)		(Spain) Valencia
11	FW	**Roberto Soldado**	27 May 1985 (aged 16)		(Spain) Real Madrid
12	DF	David Sestelo	24 November 1985 (aged 16)		(Spain) Celta Vigo
13	GK	Roberto Santamaría	27 February 1985 (aged 17)		(Spain) Osasuna
14	MF	**David Silva**	8 January 1986 (aged 16)		(Spain) Valencia
15	DF	Francisco Molinero	26 July 1985 (aged 16)		(Spain) Atlético Madrid
16	MF	**Borja Valero**	12 January 1985 (aged 17)		(Spain) Real Madrid
17	MF	Enric Maureta	28 February 1985 (aged 17)		(Spain) Espanyol
18	FW	David Rodríguez	14 February 1986 (aged 16)		(Spain) Atlético Madrid

=== FR Yugoslavia ===
Head coach: Momčilo Vujačić

No.	Pos.	Player	Date of birth (age)	Caps	Club
1	GK	Igor Baletić	1 March 1985 (aged 17)		(Federal Republic of Yugoslavia) Radnički Jugopetrol
2	FW	Miloš Živković	5 February 1985 (aged 17)		(Federal Republic of Yugoslavia) Crvena Zvezda
3	DF	**Duško Tošić**	19 January 1985 (aged 17)		(Federal Republic of Yugoslavia) OFK Beograd
4	DF	Darko Vukašinović	5 March 1985 (aged 17)		(Federal Republic of Yugoslavia) Budućnost Podgorica
5	DF	Srđa Knežević	15 April 1985 (aged 17)		(Federal Republic of Yugoslavia) Partizan
6	MF	**Perica Stančeski**	29 January 1985 (aged 17)		(Federal Republic of Yugoslavia) Partizan
7	MF	Miroslav Lečić	20 April 1985 (aged 17)		(Federal Republic of Yugoslavia) Crvena Zvezda
8	MF	Dragan Nišić	18 February 1985 (aged 17)		(Federal Republic of Yugoslavia) Vojvodina
9	FW	**Milan Purović**	7 May 1985 (aged 16)		(Federal Republic of Yugoslavia) Budućnost Podgorica
10	MF	**Simon Vukčević**	29 January 1986 (aged 16)		(Federal Republic of Yugoslavia) Partizan
11	DF	Dušan Mihajlović	30 June 1985 (aged 16)		(Federal Republic of Yugoslavia) OFK Beograd
12	GK	Miroslav Jagodić	19 March 1985 (aged 17)		(Federal Republic of Yugoslavia) Zemun
13	FW	**Janko Tumbasević**	14 January 1985 (aged 17)		(Federal Republic of Yugoslavia) Zeta
14	DF	Tomislav Pajović	15 March 1986 (aged 16)		(Federal Republic of Yugoslavia) Partizan
15	FW	**Igor Burzanović**	25 August 1985 (aged 16)		(Federal Republic of Yugoslavia) Budućnost Podgorica
16	FW	Aleksandar Petrović	1 February 1985 (aged 17)		(Federal Republic of Yugoslavia) Crvena Zvezda
17	DF	Goran Dimitrijević	22 September 1985 (aged 16)		(Federal Republic of Yugoslavia) Partizan
18	MF	Borko Veselinović	6 January 1986 (aged 16)		(Federal Republic of Yugoslavia) Partizan

== Group D ==
=== Georgia ===
Head coach: Koba Zhorzhikashvili

No.	Pos.	Player	Date of birth (age)	Caps	Club
1	GK	Zviad Chaladze	19 March 1985 (aged 17)		(Georgia (country)) Dinamo Tbilisi
2	DF	**Akaki Khubutia**	17 March 1986 (aged 16)		(Georgia (country)) Norchi Dinamo Tbilisi
3	DF	Anzor Kaladze	9 August 1985 (aged 16)		(Georgia (country)) FC Tbilisi
4	DF	Giorgi Kutivadze	20 January 1985 (aged 17)		(Georgia (country)) Imereti Kutaisi
5	DF	Beso Mikiashvili	8 April 1985 (aged 17)		(Georgia (country)) Kazbegi Tbilisi
6	MF	**Zaal Eliava**	2 January 1985 (aged 17)		(Georgia (country)) Kazbegi Tbilisi
7	MF	Shota Tchelidze	14 December 1985 (aged 16)		(Georgia (country)) Norchi Dinamo Tbilisi
8	MF	**Gocha Khojava**	16 March 1985 (aged 17)		(Georgia (country)) Kazbegi Tbilisi
9	FW	Amiran Gvelashvili	10 February 1985 (aged 17)		(Georgia (country)) Orbi Gori
10	FW	**Sandro Iashvili**	3 January 1985 (aged 17)		(Georgia (country)) WIT Georgia
11	MF	Givi Kapanadze	22 March 1985 (aged 17)		(Georgia (country)) FC Tbilisi
12	GK	Kakhaber Jincharadze	25 March 1985 (aged 17)		(Georgia (country)) WIT Georgia
13	DF	Zurab Barabadze	30 June 1985 (aged 16)		(Georgia (country)) FC Tbilisi
14	FW	**Giorgi Chelidze**	24 October 1986 (aged 15)		(Georgia (country)) Akademia Tbilisi
15	MF	Zurab Kvakhadze	15 February 1985 (aged 17)		(Georgia (country)) FC Tbilisi
16	FW	Vasili Guchashvili	25 January 1985 (aged 17)		(Georgia (country)) FC Tbilisi
17	FW	**Aleksandre Guruli**	9 November 1985 (aged 16)		(France) Boulogne
18	FW	Gogi Pipia	4 February 1985 (aged 17)		(Georgia (country)) Kazbegi Tbilisi

=== Germany ===
Head coach: Jörg Daniel

No.	Pos.	Player	Date of birth (age)	Caps	Club
1	GK	**René Adler**	15 January 1985 (aged 17)		(Germany) Bayer Leverkusen
2	DF	Kevin Schöneberg	24 August 1985 (aged 16)		(Germany) 1. FC Köln
3	DF	Michael Stegmayer	12 January 1985 (aged 17)		(Germany) Bayern Munich
4	MF	Marcel Schuon	28 April 1985 (aged 16)		(Germany) VfB Stuttgart
5	MF	Daniyel Cimen	19 January 1985 (aged 17)		(Germany) Eintracht Frankfurt
6	MF	Sascha Rammel	11 March 1985 (aged 17)		(Germany) Borussia Dortmund
7	MF	Alexander Huber	25 February 1985 (aged 17)		(Germany) Eintracht Frankfurt
8	MF	Steve Müller	16 May 1985 (aged 16)		(Germany) FC Magdeburg
9	FW	**Lukas Podolski**	4 June 1985 (aged 16)		(Germany) 1. FC Köln
10	MF	Stephan Bork	29 January 1985 (aged 17)		(Germany) Fortuna Düsseldorf
11	MF	Ersan Tekkan	6 January 1985 (aged 17)		(Germany) VfL Bochum
12	GK	Malte Bonertz	14 August 1985 (aged 16)		(Germany) VfB Stuttgart
13	MF	Tim Bauer	16 January 1985 (aged 17)		(Germany) Werder Bremen
14	MF	Paweł Thomik	25 January 1985 (aged 17)		(Germany) Bayern Munich
15	FW	Sahr Senesie	20 June 1985 (aged 16)		(Germany) Borussia Dortmund
16	FW	**Mario Gómez**	10 July 1985 (aged 16)		(Germany) VfB Stuttgart
17	FW	Sascha Traut	21 May 1985 (aged 16)		(Germany) Karlsruher SC
18	FW	Sebastian Westerhoff	14 November 1985 (aged 16)		(Germany) Schalke 04

=== Hungary ===
Head coach: András Sarlos

No.	Pos.	Player	Date of birth (age)	Caps	Club
1	GK	Gábor Máthé	10 August 1985 (aged 16)		(Hungary) Debreceni VSC
2	DF	Zoltan Torok	7 March 1985 (aged 17)		(Hungary) Győri ETO FC
3	DF	Laszlo Imrik	15 April 1985 (aged 17)		(Hungary) Győri ETO FC
4	MF	**Gábor Horváth**	4 July 1985 (aged 16)		(Hungary) Videoton FC
5	DF	Csaba Ködöböcz	19 July 1985 (aged 16)		(Hungary) Vasas SC
6	MF	**Krisztián Vadócz**	30 May 1985 (aged 16)		(Hungary) Honvéd FC
7	DF	Roland Dancs	19 April 1985 (aged 17)		(Switzerland) Grasshopper
8	FW	Dávid Mohl	22 April 1985 (aged 17)		(Hungary) Győri ETO FC
9	FW	Dávid Disztl	5 January 1985 (aged 17)		(Hungary) MTK Budapest FC
10	DF	**Dániel Tőzsér**	12 May 1985 (aged 16)		(Hungary) Debreceni VSC
11	DF	András Selei	5 May 1985 (aged 16)		(Hungary) Ferencvárosi TC
12	GK	Maté Molnár	21 January 1985 (aged 17)		(Hungary) Marcali VFC
13	MF	Dániel Varga	9 January 1985 (aged 17)		(Hungary) Ferencvárosi TC
14	MF	István Domosi	29 November 1985 (aged 16)		(Hungary) Vasas SC
15	FW	István Ribi	12 July 1985 (aged 16)		(Hungary) Vasas SC
16	DF	Dávid Horvath	1 February 1985 (aged 17)		(Hungary) Ferencvárosi TC
17	FW	Gergő Jeremiás	26 February 1985 (aged 17)		(Hungary) Debreceni VSC
18	MF	András Pal	19 August 1985 (aged 16)		(Hungary) Vasas SC

=== Poland ===
Head coach: Andrzej Zamilski

No.	Pos.	Player	Date of birth (age)	Caps	Club
1	GK	**Łukasz Fabiański**	18 April 1985 (aged 17)		(Poland) MSP Szamotuły
2	MF	Mateusz Spaczyński	16 August 1985 (aged 16)		(Poland) UKS SMS Łódź
3	DF	Klaudiusz Łatkowski	12 March 1985 (aged 17)		(Poland) KSZO Ostrowiec
4	DF	Krystian Kalinowski	19 July 1985 (aged 16)		(Poland) Zagłębie Lubin
5	DF	Piotr Stawowy	31 January 1985 (aged 17)		(Poland) Ślęza Wrocław
6	FW	Mariusz Solecki	1 January 1985 (aged 17)		(Poland) UKS SMS Łódź
7	MF	Patryk Buława	16 February 1985 (aged 17)		(Poland) Chojniczanka Chojnice
8	MF	Tomasz Szczepan	16 March 1985 (aged 17)		(Poland) Zawisza Bydgoszcz
9	DF	**Marcin Kowalczyk**	9 April 1985 (aged 17)		(Poland) UKS SMS Łódź
10	FW	Marcin Tarnowski	6 February 1985 (aged 17)		(Poland) Amica Wronki
11	MF	Michał Pędzich	17 June 1985 (aged 16)		(Poland) Śląsk Wrocław
12	GK	Marcin Juszczyk	23 January 1985 (aged 17)		(Poland) Wisła Kraków
13	MF	Radoslaw Feliński	24 May 1985 (aged 16)		(Poland) Amica Wronki
14	FW	Krzysztof Kruczek	28 January 1985 (aged 17)		(Poland) Igloopol Dębica
15	MF	Marcin Borowczyk	11 June 1985 (aged 16)		(Poland) Górnik Brzeszcze
16	DF	**Grzegorz Bartczak**	21 June 1985 (aged 16)		(Poland) Zagłębie Lubin
17	MF	Michał Lemanowicz	5 June 1985 (aged 16)		(Poland) Orlen Płock
18	DF	Paweł Jurgielewicz	15 July 1985 (aged 16)		(Poland) Hetman Białystok
