= 2004 UEFA European Under-19 Championship squads =

Player listings in youth football competition

Players born on or after 1 January 1985 were eligible to participate in the tournament. Players' age as of 13 July 2004 – the tournament's opening day. Players in bold have later been capped at full international level.

== Group A ==
=== Belgium ===
Head coach: (Belgium) Marc Van Geersom

| No. | Pos. | Player | Date of birth (age) | Caps | Club |
|---|---|---|---|---|---|
| 1 | GK | Glenn Verbauwhede | 19 May 1985 (aged 19) | | (Belgium) Club Brugge |
| 2 | DF | Antony Spinosa | 16 August 1985 (aged 18) | | (Netherlands) Willem II |
| 3 | MF | Nico Van Der Linden | 12 March 1985 (aged 19) | | (Belgium) Verbroedering Geel |
| 4 | DF | **Thomas Vermaelen** | 14 November 1985 (aged 18) | | (Netherlands) Ajax |
| 5 | DF | **Nicolas Lombaerts** | 20 March 1985 (aged 19) | | (Belgium) Gent |
| 6 | MF | Dickson Agyeman | 14 September 1985 (aged 18) | | (Belgium) Germinal Beerschot |
| 7 | MF | **Jonathan Legear** | 13 April 1987 (aged 17) | | (Belgium) Anderlecht |
| 8 | FW | Jurgen Raeymaeckers | 3 May 1985 (aged 19) | | (Belgium) Lierse |
| 9 | FW | **Björn Vleminckx** | 1 December 1985 (aged 18) | | (Belgium) Beveren |
| 10 | MF | **Faris Haroun** | 21 May 1985 (aged 19) | | (Belgium) Racing Genk |
| 11 | MF | Luwamo Garcia | 1 May 1985 (aged 19) | | (Netherlands) VVV-Venlo |
| 12 | GK | Olivier Werner | 16 April 1985 (aged 19) | | (Belgium) Mons |
| 13 | MF | Michaël Lacroix | 14 October 1985 (aged 18) | | (Belgium) Eendracht Aalst |
| 14 | DF | Jan Wuytens | 9 June 1985 (aged 19) | | (Netherlands) PSV |
| 15 | MF | Grégory Rondeux | 8 May 1985 (aged 19) | | (Belgium) Eupen |
| 16 | MF | **Killian Overmeire** | 6 December 1985 (aged 18) | | (Belgium) Lokeren |
| 17 | MF | Prince Asubonteng | 6 March 1986 (aged 18) | | (Belgium) Germinal Beerschot |
| 18 | FW | **Stijn De Smet** | 27 March 1985 (aged 19) | | (Belgium) Cercle Brugge |

=== Italy ===
Head coach: (Italy) Paolo Berrettini

| No. | Pos. | Player | Date of birth (age) | Caps | Club |
|---|---|---|---|---|---|
| 1 | GK | **Emiliano Viviano** | 1 December 1985 (aged 18) | | (Italy) Cesena |
| 2 | DF | Devis Nossa | 7 February 1985 (aged 19) | | (Italy) Internazionale |
| 3 | DF | Francesco Battaglia | 26 April 1985 (aged 19) | | (Italy) Torino |
| 4 | MF | **Antonio Nocerino** | 9 April 1985 (aged 19) | | (Italy) Genoa |
| 5 | DF | Michele Canini | 5 June 1985 (aged 19) | | (Italy) Atalanta |
| 6 | DF | Andrea Coda | 25 April 1985 (aged 19) | | (Italy) Empoli |
| 7 | MF | Cristian Antonio Agnelli | 23 September 1985 (aged 18) | | (Italy) Verona |
| 8 | MF | **Daniele Galloppa** | 15 May 1985 (aged 19) | | (Italy) Triestina |
| 9 | FW | Andrea Alberti | 15 January 1985 (aged 19) | | (Italy) Sambenedettese |
| 10 | MF | **Riccardo Montolivo** | 18 January 1985 (aged 19) | | (Italy) Atalanta |
| 11 | FW | Tonino Sorrentino | 12 March 1985 (aged 19) | | (Italy) Parma |
| 12 | GK | Gianluca Curci | 7 December 1985 (aged 18) | | (Italy) Roma |
| 13 | DF | Andrea Masiello | 5 February 1986 (aged 18) | | (Italy) Juventus |
| 14 | DF | Matteo Teoldi | 12 May 1985 (aged 19) | | (Italy) Arezzo |
| 15 | MF | Lorenzo Carotti | 31 January 1985 (aged 19) | | (Italy) Como |
| 16 | MF | Simone Bentivoglio | 29 May 1985 (aged 19) | | (Italy) Juventus |
| 17 | FW | Marco Motta | 14 May 1986 (aged 18) | | (Italy) Atalanta |
| 18 | FW | Riccardo Meggiorini | 4 September 1985 (aged 18) | | (Italy) Internazionale |

=== Switzerland ===
Head coach: (Switzerland) Pierre-André Schürmann

| No. | Pos. | Player | Date of birth (age) | Caps | Club |
|---|---|---|---|---|---|
| 1 | GK | Swen König | 3 September 1985 (aged 18) | | (Switzerland) Aarau |
| 2 | DF | Stefan Iten | 5 February 1985 (aged 19) | | (Switzerland) Grasshopper |
| 3 | DF | Arnaud Bühler | 17 January 1985 (aged 19) | | (Switzerland) Aarau |
| 4 | MF | **Johan Djourou** | 18 January 1987 (aged 17) | | (England) Arsenal |
| 5 | DF | Veroljub Salatić | 14 November 1985 (aged 18) | | (Switzerland) Grasshopper |
| 6 | MF | **Blerim Džemaili** | 12 April 1986 (aged 18) | | (Switzerland) Zürich |
| 7 | MF | **Valon Behrami** | 19 April 1985 (aged 19) | | (Italy) Verona |
| 8 | DF | **Reto Ziegler** | 16 January 1986 (aged 18) | | (Switzerland) Grasshopper |
| 9 | FW | Goran Antić | 4 July 1985 (aged 19) | | (Switzerland) Neuchâtel Xamax |
| 10 | FW | Fabrizio Zambrella | 1 March 1986 (aged 18) | | (Italy) Brescia |
| 11 | FW | Slaviša Dugić | 17 January 1985 (aged 19) | | (Switzerland) Aarau |
| 12 | GK | Diego Würmli | 13 September 1985 (aged 18) | | (Switzerland) Basel II |
| 13 | DF | Henri Siqueira | 15 January 1985 (aged 19) | | (Switzerland) Neuchâtel Xamax |
| 14 | MF | **Sandro Burki** | 16 September 1985 (aged 18) | | (Switzerland) Young Boys |
| 15 | DF | Michael Diethelm | 24 January 1985 (aged 19) | | (Switzerland) Lucerne |
| 16 | FW | Miloš Malenović | 14 January 1985 (aged 19) | | (Switzerland) Wohlen |
| 17 | FW | Guilherme Afonso | 15 November 1985 (aged 18) | | (Netherlands) Twente |
| 18 | DF | Christian Schlauri | 30 March 1985 (aged 19) | | (Switzerland) Basel II |

=== Ukraine ===
Head coach: (Ukraine) Pavlo Yakovenko

| No. | Pos. | Player | Date of birth (age) | Caps | Club |
|---|---|---|---|---|---|
| 1 | GK | Oleksiy Prokhorov | 3 April 1985 (aged 19) | | (Ukraine) Dynamo-2 Kyiv |
| 2 | MF | Maksym Trusevich | 1 August 1985 (aged 18) | | (Ukraine) Borysfen |
| 3 | DF | **Dmytro Chyhrynskyi** | 7 November 1986 (aged 17) | | (Ukraine) Shakhtar Donetsk |
| 4 | DF | Anatoliy Kitsuta | 22 December 1985 (aged 18) | | (Ukraine) Dynamo-2 Kyiv |
| 5 | DF | **Oleksandr Yatsenko** | 24 February 1985 (aged 19) | | (Ukraine) Dynamo-2 Kyiv |
| 6 | DF | Serhiy Rozhok | 25 April 1985 (aged 19) | | (Ukraine) Dynamo-2 Kyiv |
| 7 | DF | Andriy Proshyn | 19 February 1985 (aged 19) | | (Ukraine) Dynamo-2 Kyiv |
| 8 | FW | **Oleksandr Aliyev** | 3 February 1985 (aged 19) | | (Ukraine) Dynamo-2 Kyiv |
| 9 | MF | Oleksandr Sytnyk | 2 January 1985 (aged 19) | | (Ukraine) Dynamo-2 Kyiv |
| 10 | FW | **Artem Milevskyi** | 12 January 1985 (aged 19) | | (Ukraine) Dynamo Kyiv |
| 11 | FW | **Oleksandr Gladkiy** | 24 August 1987 (aged 16) | | (Ukraine) Metalist Kharkiv |
| 12 | GK | **Bohdan Shust** | 4 March 1986 (aged 18) | | (Ukraine) Karpaty |
| 13 | MF | Ivan Kotenko | 28 April 1985 (aged 19) | | (Ukraine) Dnipro |
| 14 | MF | **Kostyantyn Kravchenko** | 24 September 1986 (aged 17) | | (Ukraine) Dnipro |
| 15 | DF | **Hryhoriy Yarmash** | 4 January 1985 (aged 19) | | (Ukraine) Dynamo-2 Kyiv |
| 16 | FW | Dmytro Vorobey | 10 May 1985 (aged 19) | | (Ukraine) Dynamo-2 Kyiv |
| 17 | MF | Volodymyr Samborskyi | 29 August 1985 (aged 18) | | (Ukraine) Metalist Kharkiv |
| 18 | MF | **Oleksandr Maksymov** | 13 February 1985 (aged 19) | | (Ukraine) Metalist Kharkiv |

== Group B ==
=== Germany ===
Head coach: (Germany) Dieter Eilts

| No. | Pos. | Player | Date of birth (age) | Caps | Club |
|---|---|---|---|---|---|
| 1 | GK | **René Adler** | 15 January 1985 (aged 19) | | (Germany) Bayer Leverkusen |
| 2 | DF | **Marcell Jansen** | 4 November 1985 (aged 18) | | (Germany) Borussia Mönchengladbach |
| 3 | DF | Michael Stegmayer | 12 January 1985 (aged 19) | | (Germany) Bayern Munich II |
| 4 | DF | **Marvin Matip** | 25 September 1985 (aged 18) | | (Germany) VfL Bochum |
| 5 | FW | Nicky Adler | 23 May 1985 (aged 19) | | (Germany) 1860 Munich |
| 6 | MF | Stephan Bork | 29 January 1985 (aged 19) | | (Germany) Schalke 04 II |
| 7 | MF | Paul Thomik | 25 January 1985 (aged 19) | | (Germany) Bayern Munich II |
| 8 | MF | Andreas Ottl | 1 March 1985 (aged 19) | | (Germany) Bayern Munich II |
| 9 | FW | **Mario Gómez** | 10 July 1985 (aged 19) | | (Germany) VfB Stuttgart |
| 10 | FW | Michael Delura | 1 July 1985 (aged 19) | | (Germany) Schalke 04 |
| 11 | MF | **Christian Gentner** | 14 August 1985 (aged 18) | | (Germany) VfB Stuttgart |
| 12 | GK | Florian Fromlowitz | 2 July 1986 (aged 18) | | (Germany) 1. FC Kaiserslautern II |
| 13 | DF | Raphael Schaschko | 7 June 1985 (aged 19) | | (Germany) VfB Stuttgart II |
| 14 | MF | Oliver Hampel | 2 March 1985 (aged 19) | | (Germany) Hamburger SV II |
| 15 | MF | **Enis Alushi** | 22 December 1985 (aged 18) | | (Germany) 1. FC Köln II |
| 16 | DF | **Lukas Sinkiewicz** | 9 October 1985 (aged 18) | | (Germany) 1. FC Köln |
| 17 | MF | Alexander Huber | 25 February 1985 (aged 19) | | (Germany) Eintracht Frankfurt |
| 18 | MF | **Ashkan Dejagah** | 5 July 1986 (aged 18) | | (Germany) Hertha BSC |

=== Poland ===
Head coach: (Poland) Andrzej Zamilski

| No. | Pos. | Player | Date of birth (age) | Caps | Club |
|---|---|---|---|---|---|
| 1 | GK | **Łukasz Fabiański** | 18 April 1985 (aged 19) | | (Poland) Lech Poznań |
| 2 | DF | **Piotr Celeban** | 25 June 1985 (aged 19) | | (Poland) Pogoń Szczecin |
| 3 | DF | **Grzegorz Bartczak** | 21 June 1985 (aged 19) | | (Poland) Zagłębie Lubin |
| 4 | DF | Klaudiusz Łatkowski | 12 March 1985 (aged 19) | | (Poland) Ostrowiec Świętokrzyski |
| 5 | DF | Sebastian Madera | 30 May 1985 (aged 19) | | (Poland) Widzew Łódź |
| 6 | FW | Marcin Tarnowski | 6 February 1985 (aged 19) | | (Poland) Amica Wronki |
| 7 | MF | Tomasz Szczepan | 16 March 1985 (aged 19) | | (Poland) Amica Wronki |
| 8 | MF | Marcin Smoliński | 5 April 1985 (aged 19) | | (Poland) Legia Warszawa |
| 9 | MF | **Marcin Kowalczyk** | 9 April 1985 (aged 19) | | (Poland) FK Stal Głowno |
| 10 | MF | **Sławomir Peszko** | 19 February 1985 (aged 19) | | (Poland) Wisła Płock |
| 11 | DF | **Łukasz Piszczek** | 3 June 1985 (aged 19) | | (Poland) Zagłębie Lubin |
| 12 | GK | Marcin Juszczyk | 23 January 1985 (aged 19) | | (Poland) Górnik Wieliczka |
| 13 | DF | Piotr Stawowy | 31 January 1985 (aged 19) | | (Poland) Górnik Zabrze |
| 14 | MF | Łukasz Żyrkowski | 1 April 1985 (aged 19) | | (Poland) Piast Gliwice |
| 15 | FW | Grzegorz Szymanek | 8 December 1985 (aged 18) | | (Poland) Górnik Łęczna |
| 16 | FW | **Jakub Błaszczykowski** | 14 December 1985 (aged 18) | | (Poland) KS Częstochowa |
| 17 | MF | Łukasz Jasiński | 13 October 1985 (aged 18) | | (Poland) Aluminium Konin |
| 18 | DF | Michał Ilków-Gołąb | 11 April 1985 (aged 19) | | (Poland) Polar Wrocław |

=== Spain ===
Head coach: (Spain) José Armando Ufarte

| No. | Pos. | Player | Date of birth (age) | Caps | Club |
|---|---|---|---|---|---|
| 1 | GK | Biel Ribas | 2 December 1985 (aged 18) | | (Spain) Espanyol B |
| 2 | DF | **Sergio Ramos** | 30 March 1986 (aged 18) | | (Spain) Sevilla |
| 3 | DF | Javier Garrido | 15 March 1985 (aged 19) | | (Spain) Real Sociedad |
| 4 | DF | Alexis | 4 August 1985 (aged 18) | | (Spain) Málaga |
| 5 | DF | **Fernando Amorebieta** | 29 March 1985 (aged 19) | | (Spain) Athletic Bilbao |
| 6 | MF | Markel Bergara | 5 June 1986 (aged 18) | | (Spain) Real Sociedad B |
| 7 | DF | **Juanfran** | 9 January 1985 (aged 19) | | (Spain) Real Madrid |
| 8 | MF | **Borja Valero** | 12 January 1985 (aged 19) | | (Spain) Real Madrid |
| 9 | FW | **Roberto Soldado** | 27 May 1985 (aged 19) | | (Spain) Real Madrid B |
| 10 | FW | Víctor | 28 February 1985 (aged 19) | | (Spain) Mallorca |
| 11 | FW | **David Silva** | 8 January 1986 (aged 18) | | (Spain) Eibar |
| 12 | DF | Javier Chica | 17 May 1985 (aged 19) | | (Spain) Espanyol B |
| 13 | GK | Manu Fernández | 9 May 1986 (aged 18) | | (Spain) Sporting Gijón B |
| 14 | DF | Miquel Robusté (c) | 20 May 1985 (aged 19) | | (Spain) Espanyol B |
| 15 | MF | **Raúl Albiol** | 4 September 1985 (aged 18) | | (Spain) Getafe |
| 16 | MF | **Rubén de la Red** | 5 June 1985 (aged 19) | | (Spain) Real Madrid B |
| 17 | FW | Joan Tomàs | 17 May 1985 (aged 19) | | (Spain) Espanyol B |
| 18 | MF | Jaime Gavilán | 12 May 1985 (aged 19) | | (Spain) Tenerife |

=== Turkey ===
Head coach: (Turkey) Gündüz Tekin Onay

| No. | Pos. | Player | Date of birth (age) | Caps | Club |
|---|---|---|---|---|---|
| 1 | GK | Serkan Kırıntılı | 15 February 1985 (aged 19) | | (Turkey) Adanaspor |
| 2 | DF | Hakan Aslantaş | 26 August 1985 (aged 18) | | (Turkey) Gençlerbirliği |
| 3 | DF | Orhan Şam | 1 June 1986 (aged 18) | | (Turkey) Gençlerbirliği |
| 4 | DF | Ozan Tahtaişleyen | 18 January 1985 (aged 19) | | (Turkey) Beşiktaş |
| 5 | DF | Ergün Teber | 1 September 1985 (aged 18) | | (Turkey) Kayserispor |
| 6 | MF | Zafer Şakar | 25 September 1985 (aged 18) | | (Turkey) Galatasaray |
| 7 | MF | **Olcan Adın** | 30 September 1985 (aged 18) | | (Turkey) Antalyaspor |
| 8 | MF | Sezer Öztürk | 3 November 1985 (aged 18) | | (Germany) Bayer Leverkusen |
| 9 | MF | Kerim Zengin | 13 April 1985 (aged 19) | | (Turkey) Mersin İdmanyurdu |
| 10 | MF | **Selçuk İnan** | 10 February 1985 (aged 19) | | (Turkey) Dardanel |
| 11 | FW | Ali Öztürk | 28 July 1986 (aged 17) | | (Turkey) Gençlerbirliği |
| 12 | GK | Şener Özcan | 3 March 1985 (aged 19) | | (Turkey) Gençlerbirliği |
| 13 | FW | **Burak Yılmaz** | 15 July 1985 (aged 18) | | (Turkey) Antalyaspor |
| 14 | FW | Emre Aygün | 1 June 1985 (aged 19) | | (Turkey) Yimpaş Yozgatspor |
| 15 | MF | Sinan Turan | 1 July 1985 (aged 19) | | (Turkey) Elazığspor |
| 16 | FW | Cafercan Aksu | 15 January 1987 (aged 17) | | (Turkey) Galatasaray |
| 17 | FW | Onur Çubukçu | 1 June 1985 (aged 19) | | (Turkey) Beylerbeyi |
| 18 | DF | Tuğçin Kadıoğlu | 20 August 1986 (aged 17) | | (Turkey) Aromaspor |
