= Van der Linde =

Van der Linde is a surname of Dutch origin. Notable people with the surname include:

- Angelika van der Linde, German statistician
- Christoffel van der Linde (born 1980), South African rugby union player
- Etienne van der Linde (born 1978), South African racing driver, uncle of Kelvin
- Kelvin van der Linde (born 1996), South African racing driver, nephew of Etienne
- Mary Vanderlinde (1929–2005), American politician
- Roald van der Linde (born 1968), Dutch politician
- Sheldon van der Linde (born 1999), South African racing driver, younger brother of Kelvin
- Wensten van der Linde (born 1990), South African footballer
- Dutch van der Linde (born 1850s–1911), character within Red Dead Redemption and Red Dead Redemption 2
- Herald Van der Linde, Dutch historian and businessman

== See also ==
- Van der Linden
