= André Carvalho =

André Carvalho may refer to:

- André Carvalho (Brazilian footballer) (born 1984), Brazilian football defender
- André Carvalho (Portuguese footballer) (born 1985), Portuguese football midfielder
- André Carvalho (cyclist) (born 1997), Portuguese cyclist
