= Nicky Best =

English statistician

Nicola G. "Nicky" Best is a statistician known for her work on the deviance information criterion in Bayesian inference^{[B]}^{[E]} and as a developer of Bayesian inference using Gibbs sampling.^{[A]}^{[D]} She is a former professor of biostatistics and epidemiology at Imperial College London and is currently a biostatistician for GlaxoSmithKline.

== Education and career ==
Best earned a master's degree in medical statistics from the University of Leicester in 1990 and then a PhD in biostatistics from the University of Cambridge, supervised by David Spiegelhalter. She joined the Imperial College faculty in 1996. She moved from Imperial to GlaxoSmithKline in 2014.

She was editor-in-chief of the Journal of the Royal Statistical Society, Series A (Statistics in Society), from 2001 to 2004.

== Recognition ==
Best won the Guy Medal in Bronze of the Royal Statistical Society in 2004. In 2018, she won the Bradford Hill Medal of the Royal Statistical Society "for her exquisite expositions of Bayesian methods through BUGS software, workshops, lectures, prior elicitations, textbooks and peer-review publications; and for substantive applications ranging from clinical trials and cost-effectiveness to epidemiology and, most recently, the optimization of pharmaceutical research programmes". She was the 2025 recipient of the Greenfield Industrial Medal of the Royal Statistical Society for her work "co-developing the WinBUGS software and leading methodological innovation and data science solutions to improve the efficiency of clinical trials".

== Selected publications ==
A.	David J. Lunn; Andrew Thomas; Nicky Best; David J. Spiegalhalter (2000), "WinBUGS - A Bayesian modelling framework: Concepts, structure, and extensibility", Statistics and Computing, 10 (4): 325–337, doi:10.1023/A:1008929526011, ISSN 0960-3174, Wikidata Q108929102

B.	David J. Spiegelhalter; Nicola G. Best; Bradley P. Carlin; Angelika van der Linde (October 2002), "Bayesian measures of model complexity and fit", Journal of the Royal Statistical Society Series B: Statistical Methodology, 64 (4): 583–639, doi:10.1111/1467-9868.00353, ISSN 1369-7412, Zbl 1067.62010, Wikidata Q56532420

C.	Martyn Plummer; Nicky Best; Kate Cowles; Karen Vines (2006), "CODA: convergence diagnosis and output analysis for MCMC", Rnews, 6 (1): 7, Wikidata Q108929147

D.	David Lunn; David Spiegelhalter; Andrew Thomas; Nicky Best (10 November 2009), "The BUGS project: Evolution, critique and future directions", Statistics in Medicine, 28 (25): 3049–67, doi:10.1002/SIM.3680, ISSN 0277-6715, PMID 19630097, Wikidata Q28252857

E.	David J. Spiegelhalter; Nicola G. Best; Bradley P. Carlin; Angelika van der Linde (8 April 2014), "The deviance information criterion: 12 years on", Journal of the Royal Statistical Society Series B: Statistical Methodology, 76 (3): 485–493, doi:10.1111/RSSB.12062, ISSN 1369-7412, Zbl 1411.62027, Wikidata Q108929214
