= Kopecký =

Kopecký (feminine Kopecká) is a Czech and Slovak surname which may refer to:

- Arno Kopecky, Canadian journalist and travel writer
- Ivan Kopecký (born 1946), Czech football manager
- Jan Kopecký (born 1982), Czech rally driver
- Jaromír Kopecký (1921–unknown), Czech diplomat
- Julia Kopecký (born 2004), Czech racing cyclist
- Lotte Kopecky (born 1995), Belgian racing cyclist
- Marek Kopecký (born 1977), Czech futsal player
- Matěj Kopecký (1775–1847), Czech puppeteer
- Matyáš Kopecký (born 2003), Czech racing cyclist
- Milan Kopecký (born 1981), Czech ice hockey player
- Miloš Kopecký (1922–1996), Czech actor
- Radim Kopecký (born 1985), Czech footballer
- Štěpán Kopecký (1901–1956), Czech art director
- Tomáš Kopecký (born 1982), Slovak ice hockey player
- Tomáš Kopecký (cyclist) (born 2000), Czech racing cyclist
- Václav Kopecký (1897–1961), Czech politician
- Vlastimil Kopecký (1912–1967), Czech footballer
- William Kopecky (born 1969), American musician
