= François Moubandje =

Swiss footballer (born 1990)

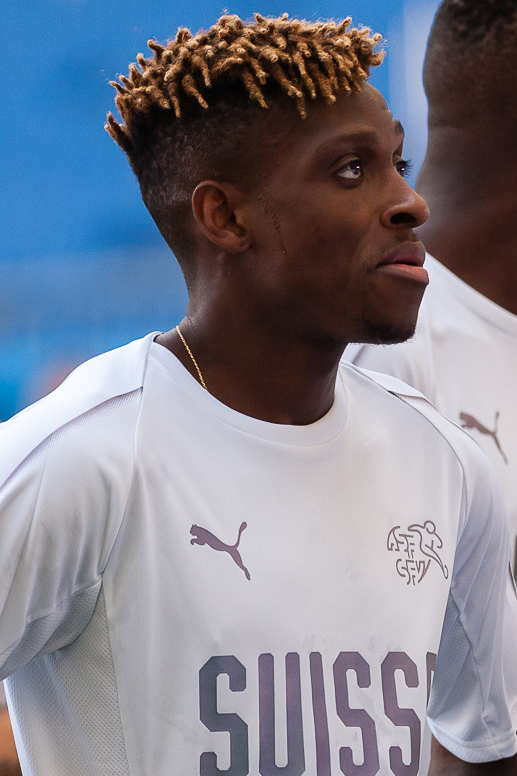
- Moubandje training with Switzerland at the 2018 FIFA World Cup

Personal information
- Full name: Jacques François Moubandje
- Date of birth: 21 June 1990 (age 36)
- Place of birth: Douala, Cameroon
- Height: 1.80 m (5 ft 11 in)
- Position: Left-back

Senior career*
Years	Team	Apps	(Gls)
2007–2009	Meyrin	26	(1)
2009–2013	Servette	72	(2)
2013–2019	Toulouse	132	(0)
2019–2022	Dinamo Zagreb	14	(0)
2020–2021	→ Alanyaspor (loan)	35	(3)
2022	→ Göztepe (loan)	8	(0)
2022	Göztepe	0	(0)
2022–2024	Sion	6	(1)
Total		293	(7)

International career
2011	Switzerland U21	5	(0)
2014–2019	Switzerland	21	(0)
- * Club domestic league appearances and goals

Jacques François Moubandje (born 21 June 1990) is a former professional footballer who played as a left back. Born in Cameroon, he represented the Switzerland national team.

== Club career ==
After spending his youth career at FC Perly-Certoux, FC Saint-Jean GE and Servette, Moubandje settled his career at Meyrin, where he started his career at sixteen years old.

=== Servette ===
In January 2010, Moubandje re-joined Servette, the club he spent when he was thirteen before he left for Meryin, signing his first professional contract.

Moubandje remained in the reserve team until he made his first team debut for Servette debut in the second leg of the relegation play-offs, in a 3–1 win over Bellinzona on 31 May 2011. He then made his league debut for the club on 23 July 2011, where he came on as a substitute for Christian Schlauri in the 37th minute, in a 3–2 win over Zürich. However, in a match against Neuchâtel Xamax on 14 August 2011, he received a red card after a second bookable offence, in a 0–0 draw. Moubandje scored his first Servette goal on 26 October 2011, in a 4–1 win over Grasshopper. In a 3–0 loss against Thun on 19 October 2011, he received a red card for the second time this season after another second bookable offence. He finished the 2011–12 season having made 26 appearances scoring once.

In the 2012–13 season, Moubandje established himself in the starting eleven in the left-back position and appeared in the first nine matches until he suffered a knee injury. He also made his Europa League debut in the first leg of a Europa League Qualifier, in a 2–0 win over Gandzasar Kapan and went on to make three more appearances. After months on the sidelines, Moubandje made his return, coming on as a substitute for Vincent Rüfli, in a 2–1 loss against Basel. After being sent-off in a 4–1 loss against St. Gallen for a second bookable offence, Moubandje was unable to help Servette, who were relegated from the Swiss Super League at the end of the 2012–13 season.

In the 2013–14 season, Moubandje made six appearances for Servette in the Challenge League and scored once, in a 2–0 win over Chiasso on 25 August 2013.

=== Toulouse ===
On 1 September 2013, Moubandje signed a four-year deal with Toulouse. He is expected to fill the gap left by the departure of Cheikh M'Bengue to Rennes.

Moubandje made his Toulouse debut coming on as a substitute for Issiaga Sylla in the 85th minute of a 1–1 draw against Marseille. However, throughout the 2013–14 season, he suffered injuries, which restricted him to three appearances. He reflected his first season at Toulouse, expressing his disappointment, due to injuries, but hoped he could make a breakthrough in the first team next season.

In the 2014–15 season, Moubandje made his return to the first team, being substituted on in the 60th minute of a 2–1 win over Lyon on 16 August 2014. After returning from an injury, he established himself in the starting eleven. He then provided an assist for Martin Braithwaite, who scored a winning goal in a 2–1 win over Nantes on 14 December 2013. He provided another assist, for Jean-Armel Kana-Biyik's winning goal in a 2–1 win over Bordeaux. Despite suffering setbacks through injuries and suspension, Moubandje made 33 appearances in all competitions.

In the 2015–16 season, Moubandje competed with William Matheus for a place in the starting lineup. In a match against Marseille on 23 September 2015, he received a red card after a second bookable offence. He had few first-team opportunities and was linked with a move away from Toulouse, but stayed at the club nevertheless. He was recalled to the first team on 16 January 2016, where he played for four minutes after coming on as a substitute, in a 2–1 loss against Paris Saint-Germain. Three days later, on 19 January 2016, Toulouse played against Paris Saint-Germain for the second time in three days in the fourth round of Coupe De France and Moubandje scored in a 2–1 loss. He ended the 2015–16 season with 28 appearances and one goal in all competitions.

Ahead of the 2016–17 season, Moubandje signed a three-year contract extension with the club, keeping him until 2019. Following William Matheus' departure, he regained his first team place in the left-back position and helped the club to a winning start, including a 2–0 win over defending champions Paris Saint-Germain. He also provided an assist for Jimmy Durmaz's winning goal in a 2–1 win over Guingamp on 17 September 2016.

=== Dinamo Zagreb ===
On 15 July 2019, Moubandje signed a three-year deal with Dinamo Zagreb on a free transfer, with his contract with Toulouse having expired that same month.

=== Alanyaspor ===
In September 2020, Moubandje joined Alanyaspor on a nine months long loan. He returned to Dinamo Zagreb in July 2021.

== International career ==
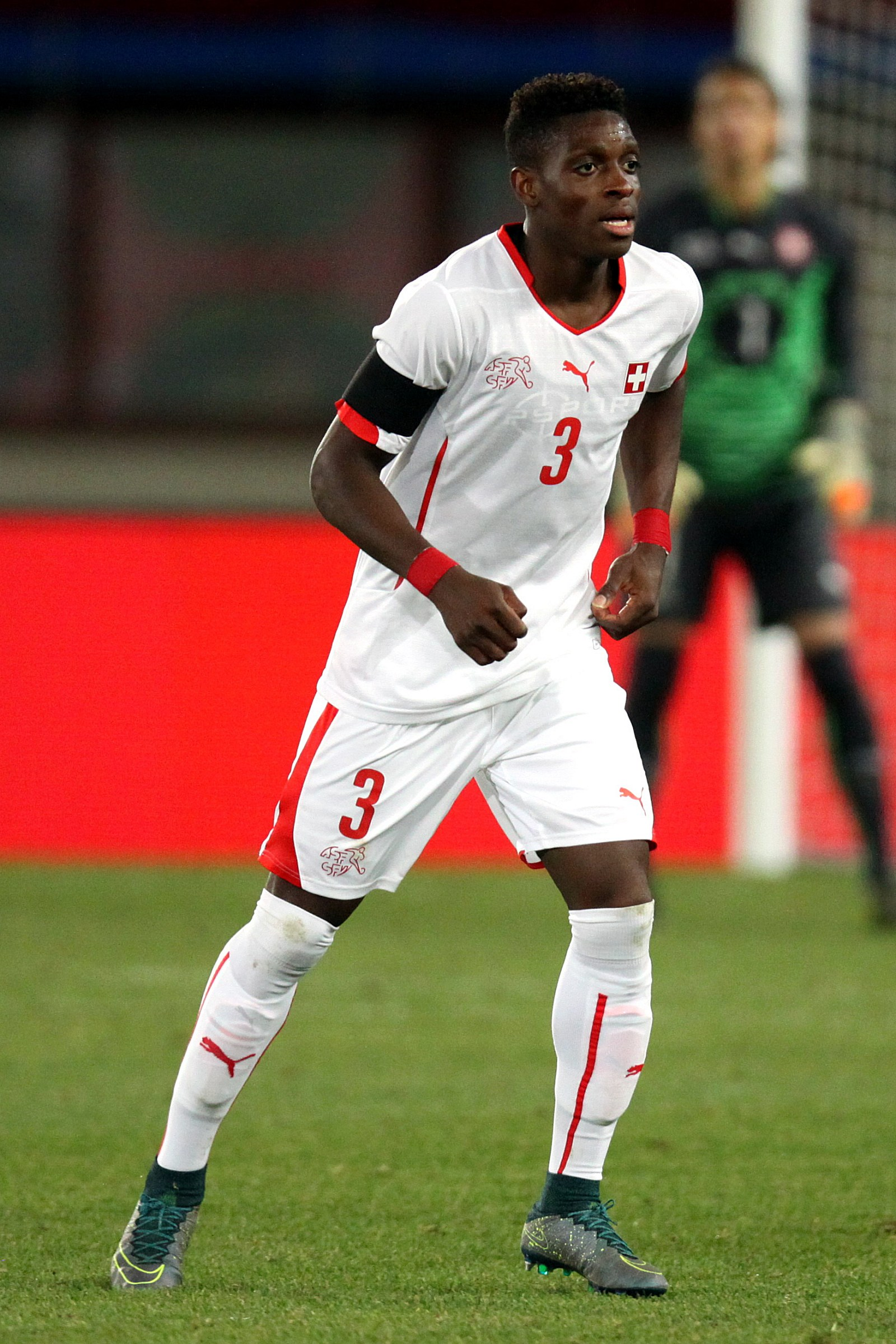
Moubandje playing against Austria in November 2015.

Moubandje was eligible to play for Switzerland and Cameroon, his country of birth.

In November 2011, Moubandje was called by the Switzerland U21 for the first time and made his Switzerland U21 debut against Georgia U21 in the qualification of the UEFA European Under-21 Championship.

Three years later, on 15 November 2014, Moubandje was called up by the Switzerland national team for the first time and made his debut, where he played 75 minutes before being substituted, in a 4–0 win over Lithuania. His performance at Toulouse earned him a squad place for the UEFA Euro 2016 championship, but spent most of the campaign on the substitution bench and made no appearances for the national side. He was included in the Switzerland national football team 23 man squad for the 2018 FIFA World Cup.

In 2019, he represented Switzerland at the inaugural UEFA Nations League Finals, where his team finished in fourth.

== Personal life ==
Born in Douala, Cameroon, Moubandje lived in Cameroon until his family moved to Geneva, Switzerland when he was eight, along with his brothers. Moubandje revealed that his older brother introduced him to football when he gave him his first football shoes and revealed that he used to play in barefoot in his home country. In addition to having Cameroonian citizenship, he also holds Swiss citizenship.

Moubandje revealed that before the game, he makes a sign of a cross and kisses his tattoo.

== Career statistics ==
=== International ===
As of 22 June 2018

Switzerland
Year	Apps	Goals
2014	2	0
2015	6	0
2016	3	0
2017	4	0
2018	3	0
Total	18	0
