= Kobylík =

Kobylík is a Czech surname. Notable people with the surname include:

- David Kobylík (b. 1981), Czech footballer, brother of Petr
- Petr Kobylík (b. 1985), Czech footballer, brother of David
