= Van Linden =

Van Linden is a surname. Notable people with the surname include:

- Alex Van Linden (born 1952), Belgian cyclist
- Rik Van Linden (born 1949), Belgian cyclist, brother of Alex

== See also ==
- Van der Linden, another surname
