= Jéssica S. Scheumann =

Brazilian children's writer (born 1992)

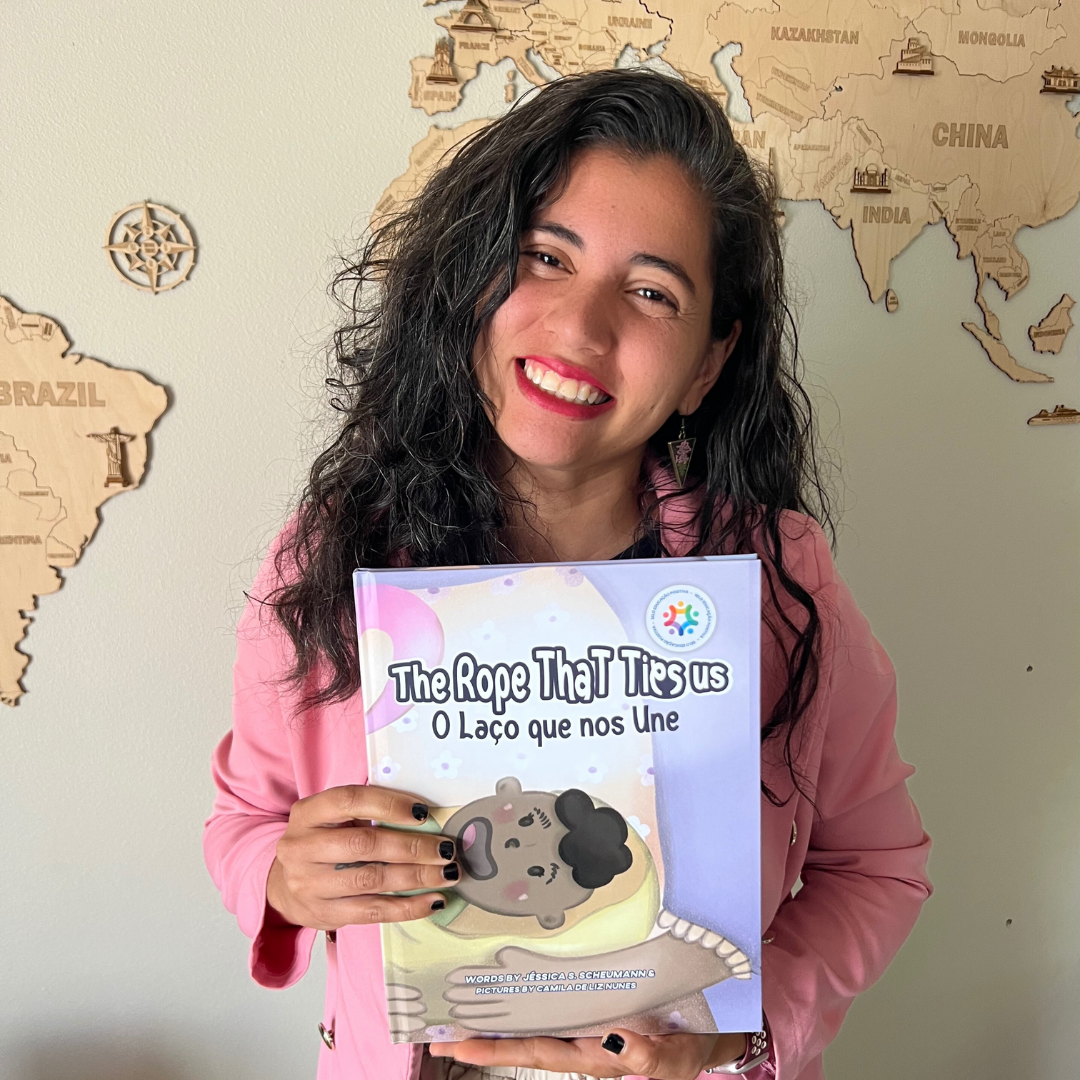
- Jéssica S. Scheumann holding her second book The Rope That Ties Us in 2025
- Born: June 7, 1992 (age 34); Itabuna, Bahia, Brazil
- Education: BA in Journalism, União Metropolitana de Educação e Cultura (Unime); Master’s in Positive Parenting, Faculdade Brasília
- Occupations: Author, publisher, child development specialist, journalist
- Writing career
- Language: Portuguese, English
- Years active: 2023–present
- Notable works: Sometimes It’s Time; The Rope That Ties Us; Good Night, Amazon; Where Summer Melts Christmas;
- Notable awards: Positive Parenting Seal (2025)
- Website: jessicasscheumann.com arteirinha.com arteirinhalivros.com.br

Jéssica S. Scheumann (ˈdʒɛsɪkə ˈɛs ˈʃaɪmən (born 7 June 1992) is a Brazilian-born children's writer, publisher, and child development specialist based in the United States. She is the founder of Arteirinha, a bilingual Portuguese–English publishing house, through which she has authored several picture books including Sometimes It’s Time (Tem Horas que é a Hora), The Rope That Ties Us (O Laço que Nos Une), Good Night, Amazon (Boa Noite, Amazônia), and Where Summer Melts Christmas (Quando o Verão Derrete o Natal).

Her work draws on child development science, informed by her master's degree in Positive Parenting. Her books have been recognized with distinctions such as the Positive Parenting Seal from Escola da Educação Positiva and reviewed by outlets including Readers’ Favorite and the Feathered Quill.

== Early life and education ==
Scheumann was born in Itabuna and grew up in Porto Seguro, both in the state of Bahia, Brazil. Although reading was not a common practice in her household, she discovered a love of literature in childhood after borrowing ''The Wonderful Wizard of Oz'' from her school library as part of a class assignment. Although the class was instructed to read only one chapter, she finished the entire book in a single night — an experience she has since described as the beginning of her storytelling journey. She earned a BA in Social Communication with a focus on Journalism from União Metropolitana de Educação e Cultura (Unime) in Itabuna in 2014, and went on to work in marketing, copywriting, and journalism in Bahia before moving abroad.

In 2019, she moved to the United States as part of an au pair exchange program, a live-in childcare arrangement that connects young adults with host families abroad. She lived first in Maryland and later in Austin, Texas, before relocating to Washington State. While in Texas, she studied children's literature at Austin Community College, during which she developed the manuscript that became her first book, Sometimes It’s Time (Tem Horas que é a Hora). In 2024, she completed a master's degree in positive parenting at Faculdade Brasília.

== Career ==
Scheumann began her professional career in journalism, marketing, and copywriting in Brazil before turning to children's literature. In 2020, while living in the United States, she took part in a children's literature program that led to the manuscript for her first book, Sometimes It’s Time.

In 2022, she launched Arteirinha, initially as a subscription box providing arts and crafts materials for Brazilian children abroad. The project later developed into a bilingual publishing company specializing in Portuguese–English picture books. Under Arteirinha, she has authored four titles: Sometimes It’s Time (2023), The Rope That Ties Us (2023), Good Night, Amazon (2024), and Where Summer Melts Christmas (2024).

In 2025, Arteirinha expanded its catalog with the publication of I Feel, I Learn, I Grow (Eu Sinto, Eu Aprendo, Eu Cresço) by Ana Stone, the company’s first book by another author. The title, like Scheumann’s The Rope That Ties Us, received the Positive Parenting Seal from Escola da Educação Positiva.

Scheumann’s works are published in bilingual format and include notes to caregivers addressing aspects of child development. Her books have been reviewed in outlets including Readers’ Favorite and Feathered Quill.

She is a member of the International Academy of Brazilian Literature (Academia Internacional de Literatura Brasileira), and her publishing house is a member of the Brazilian Book Chamber (Câmara Brasileira do Livro).

== Works ==
=== Children's Author ===
- Sometimes It’s Time (2023) — a picture book about change and loss, written during her studies in children’s literature, illustrated by Saramello.
- The Rope That Ties Us (2023) — a story exploring the bond between a mother and child, awarded the Positive Parenting Seal by Escola da Educação Positiva, illustrated by Camila de Liz Nunes.
- Good Night, Amazon (2024) — a bedtime story introducing young readers to animals of the Amazon rainforest, illustrated by Camila de Liz Nunes.
- Where Summer Melts Christmas (2024) — a story about cultural contrasts, following a child who experiences Christmas in Brazil for the first time, illustrated by Gustavo Neres.

=== Publisher/editor/translator ===
- I Feel, I Learn, I Grow (2025) — a picture book that helps children identify and name their emotions while guiding caregivers to support them with empathy; written by Ana Stone and illustrated by Amália Lira.

=== Other publications ===
- Textos Não Escritos: Devaneios de um mente inquieta em fases de ebulição emocional (2020) — collection of poems and thoughts.

== Recognition ==
Scheumann's books have been reviewed by publications including Readers’ Favorite and Feathered Quill. Her book The Rope That Ties Us was awarded the Positive Parenting Seal by Escola da Educação Positiva. In 2025, Arteirinha’s publication I Feel, I Learn, I Grow by Ana Stone also received the Positive Parenting Seal and was reviewed by Readers’ Favorite. She is a member of the International Academy of Brazilian Literature (Academia Internacional de Literatura Brasileira). Her publishing house, Arteirinha, is a member of the Brazilian Book Chamber (Câmara Brasileira do Livro).

== Personal life ==
Scheumann lives in a small town in Washington State, United States, with her husband.
