= Steven Rodrigues =

American-born Portuguese footballer

Personal information
- Full name: Steven Silva Rodrigues
- Date of birth: 12 February 1985 (age 41)
- Place of birth: Boston, Massachusetts, United States
- Height: 1.72 m (5 ft 7 1/2 in)
- Position: Right-back

Team information
- Current team: reformado

Youth career
- 2002–2004: Boavista

Senior career*
Years	Team	Apps	(Gls)
2004–2005	Paredes		
2005–2006	Gondomar	3	(0)
2006–2007	Nelas		
2007–2011	Arouca	31	(0)
2011–2012	Boavista	10	(0)
2012–2013	Leixões	23	(0)
2013–2014	UD Oliveirense	23	(0)
2014–2017	Salgueiros	69	(0)
2017–	Lourosa	0	(0)

International career^{‡}
2001	Portugal U15	8	(0)
2002	Portugal U17	7	(0)
2003	Portugal U18	7	(0)
2003	Portugal U19	9	(0)
2005	Portugal U20	6	(0)
- * Club domestic league appearances and goals as of 19 August 2017 ‡ National team caps and goals as of 31 July 2018

Steven Silva Rodrigues (born 12 February 1985), is an American-born Portuguese footballer who currently plays for Lourosa.

== Career ==
Steven was born in Boston, Massachusetts and subsequently moved to Portugal at the age of four.

A right-back, he has spent his career in the Portuguese second and third divisions. He originally came up with Boavista F.C. before the Porto-based club fell on hard times; he then played on loan at União Paredes and Gondomar. Steven spent a year with Nelas before moving on to Arouca. After a lengthy stint, he returned to Boavista for a year and then moved back to the second division with Leixões in July 2012.

== International career ==
Steven represented Portugal at the 2002 UEFA European Under-17 Championship.
