= Van der Linden =

Van der Linden is a Dutch toponymic surname meaning "from the linden tree". It can also be spelled Vander Linden or Vanderlinden. Notable people with the surname include:

== van der Linden ==
- Antoine van der Linden (born 1976), Dutch footballer
- Charles Huguenot van der Linden (1909–1987), Dutch film director
- Dolf van der Linden (1915–1999), Dutch conductor
- Emmanuel van der Linden d’Hooghvorst (1781–1866), Belgian politician
- Eric van der Linden (born 1974), Dutch triathlete
- Floris van der Linden (born 1996), Dutch footballer
- Gerard van der Linden (born 1981), Dutch rower
- Gerry van der Linden (born 1952), Dutch novelist and poet
- Henk van der Linden (footballer) (1918–1985), Dutch footballer
- Henk van der Linden (1925–2021), Dutch filmmaker
- James Van der Linden (born 1930), Belgian postal historian
- Jef Van Der Linden (1927–2008), Belgian footballer
- Joannes Antonides van der Linden (1609–1664), Dutch physician, botanist, author and librarian
- Jop van der Linden (born 1990), Dutch footballer
- Lennart van der Linden (born 1983), Dutch politician
- Ludo Van Der Linden (1951–1983), Belgian cyclist
- Maarten van der Linden (born 1969), Dutch rower
- Marc Van Der Linden (born 1964), Belgian footballer
- Marcel van der Linden (born 1952), Dutch social scientist
- Maritzka van der Linden (born 1962), Dutch swimmer
- Martijn van der Linden (born 1979), Dutch illustrator
- Nico Van Der Linden (born 1985), Belgian footballer
- Peter van der Linden (born 1963), Dutch technology writer
- Pierre van der Linden (born 1946), Dutch jazz drummer
- Pieter Cort van der Linden (1846–1935), Dutch politician
- René van der Linden (born 1943), Dutch politician
- Rick van der Linden (1946–2006), Dutch composer and keyboardist
- Sabina van der Linden-Wolanski (1927–2011), Polish-Australian Holocaust survivor and author
- Sander van der Linden (born 1986), Social psychologist
- Teunis van der Linden (1884–1965), Dutch chemist after whom the insecticide Lindane is named
- Tonny van der Linden (1932–2017), Dutch footballer
- Vita van der Linden (born 1997), Dutch association football player
- Wesley Van der Linden (born 1982), Belgian cyclist
- Wim van der Linden (1941–2001), Dutch photographer and film and television director

== Vander Linden, Vanderlinden ==
- Aubert Vanderlinden (born 1985), Belgian ballet dancer
- Barbara Vanderlinden (born 1965), Belgian art critic, editor and curator
- Guy Vander Linden (born 1948), American politician
- Joseph Vanderlinden (1798–1877), Belgian revolutionary and politician
- Pierre Léonard Vander Linden (1797–1831), Belgian entomologist
- Ron Vanderlinden (born 1956), American football coach

Van Linden

- Alex Van Linden (born 1952), Belgian cyclist, brother of Rik
- Rik Van Linden (born 1949), Belgian cyclist, brother of Alex

== See also ==
- 2538 Vanderlinden, a main-belt asteroid
- Van der Linde
