= Dušan Mihajlović (footballer) =

Serbian footballer

Personal information
- Date of birth: 30 June 1985 (age 41)
- Place of birth: Zrenjanin, SFR Yugoslavia
- Height: 1.75 m (5 ft 9 in)
- Position: Midfielder

Senior career*
Years	Team	Apps	(Gls)
2001	Proleter Zrenjanin	5	(0)
2002–2005	OFK Beograd	12	(2)
2003	→ Veternik (loan)	12	(3)
2004	→ Mladi Radnik (loan)	4	(1)
2005	→ Srem (loan)	1	(0)
2005–2008	Bežanija	81	(6)
2009	Čukarički	12	(0)
2010	Sevojno	10	(1)
2010–2011	Sloboda Užice	10	(0)
2012–2013	Banat Zrenjanin	35	(2)
2013–2015	Olympic Azzaweya		
2015–2016	Bačka 1901	5	(0)
2016–2017	Bežanija	4	(0)
2018	OFK Vršac		

International career^{‡}
2002	FR Yugoslavia U17		
- * Club domestic league appearances and goals as of 11 March 2017 ‡ National team caps and goals as of 11 March 2017

Dušan Mihajlović (Serbian Cyrillic: Душан Михајловић; born 30 June 1985) is a Serbian retired football player who played as a midfielder.

He played for Proleter Zrenjanin in 2001, then moved to OFK Belgrade in 2003 before moving to FK Bežanija in 2006. He joined FK Čukarički in January 2009.

Mihajlović moved to several more clubs throughout his career, including GFK Sloboda Uzice (2010), Banat Zrenjanin (2011), FK Backa (2012), FK Bezanija (2016), Vrsac (2017), Partizan Uljma (2018) and Radnicki (2020). He finished his career at Bilecanin in 2022.

He was part of the FR Yugoslavia U-17 team at the 2002 UEFA European Under-17 Football Championship.

Mihajlović retired from professional football in July 2022.
