= Wilson Sanches Leal =

Portuguese footballer (born 1985)

Personal information
- Full name: Wilson José Sanches Leal
- Date of birth: April 15, 1985 (age 41)
- Place of birth: Setúbal, Portugal
- Height: 1.78 m (5 ft 10 in)
- Position: Midfielder

Team information
- Current team: Viry-Châtillon

Youth career
- –: Viry-Châtillon
- –: Cannes

Senior career*
Years	Team	Apps	(Gls)
2002–2004	Cannes	1	(0)
2004–2009	Créteil	38	(0)
2006–2007	→ Cherbourg (loan)	25	(2)
2009–2010	Drancy		
2010–2011	Villemomble	11	(0)
2012–	Viry-Châtillon	22	(0)

International career
2001–2002	Portugal U17	6	(0)
- * Club domestic league appearances and goals as of July 1, 2013

Wilson José Sanches Leal (born April 15, 1985) is a Portuguese footballer who plays as a midfielder for Viry-Châtillon. He previously played club football for Cannes, Créteil, for whom he made 17 appearances in Ligue 2, Cherbourg, Drancy and Villemomble. In international football, he represented Portugal at under-17 level.

== Personal life ==
Sanches Leal was born in Setúbal, Portugal, but raised in the Grigny suburb of Paris. After his professional football career ended, he started a building firm in Paris.

== Football career ==
Sanches Leal began his football career as a youngster with his local club, Viry-Châtillon, before joining the youth system of Cannes. While with Cannes, he won six caps for Portugal at under-17 level, which included all three of Portugal's group matches at the 2002 UEFA Under-17 Championships. He played once for the club's first team in the Championnat National (the third tier of French football) before returning to the Paris area in summer 2004 where he joined Créteil, primarily as a backup player.

He made his Ligue 2 debut on July 29, 2005, as a second-half substitute in a 3–2 victory over Caen. Over the 2005–06 season, he appeared in seventeen Ligue 2 matches, and was rewarded with his first professional contract. Sanches Leal spent the following season on loan at Cherbourg, where he scored twice from 25 appearances in the Championnat National. A groin injury sustained shortly before the end of the season kept him out until December 2007, when he returned to action with Créteil's reserves. He made two assists on his return to the first team – who had been relegated in his absence – in January, and finished the season with 13 league appearances. He played only infrequently in 2008–09, and left the club at the end of the season.

After a trial, he signed for Drancy, bottom of the Championnat de France amateur (CFA). The new blood helped Drancy retain their fourth-tier status, and Sanches Leal moved sideways, to Villemomble. In January 2011, he walked out of the stadium before the start of a match against Noisy to express his unhappiness at being omitted from the starting eleven. He did not play for the club again, only returning to football in June 2012 after more than a year out, when he signed for CFA club Viry-Châtillon, for whom he had played as a youngster.
