= Slaviša Dugić =

Swiss footballer (born 1985)

Personal information
- Full name: Slaviša Dugić
- Date of birth: 17 January 1985 (age 41)
- Place of birth: Gradačac, SFR Yugoslavia
- Height: 1.88 m (6 ft 2 in)
- Position: Forward

Senior career*
Years	Team	Apps	(Gls)
2001–2002	SC Kriens	?	(?)
2002–2004	FC Servette	10	(1)
2005	FC Aarau	19	(3)
2005	Catania		
2006	Yverdon-Sport	9	(1)
2006–2007	FC Wohlen	11	(4)
2007	SC Buochs	6	(8)
2008	FK Modriča	12	(5)
2008–2010	Aris Limassol	45	(19)
2010–2011	Ethnikos Achna	17	(0)
2011–2012	Othellos	16	(5)
2012	Borac Banja Luka	9	(0)
2013	SC Buochs	18	(9)
2013–2015	FC Altdorf		

International career^{‡}
- Switzerland U-17
	Switzerland U-18	29	(25)
- Switzerland U-19
	Switzerland U-20	1	(0)
- * Club domestic league appearances and goals as of 5 May 2011 ‡ National team caps and goals as of 5 May 2011

Slaviša Dugić (Serbian Cyrillic: Славиша Дугић; born 17 January 1985) is a Swiss professional football player of Bosnian Serb descent.

== Background ==
He had played for Swiss teams SC Kriens, FC Servette, FC Aarau, Italian Catania Calcio, Yverdon-Sport FC, FC Wohlen, SC Buochs, Bosnian FK Modriča and Aris Limassol F.C., Ethnikos Achna FC and Othellos Athienou F.C. from Cyprus. He is a former youth international and was in the Swiss U-17 squad that won the 2002 U-17 European Championships.

== Honours ==
Switzerland

- UEFA U-17 European Champion (1): 2002

FK Modriča Maxima

- Premier League of Bosnia and Herzegovina (1): 2007–08

Aris Limassol

- Cypriot Second Division Topscorer: 2008–09

== External sources ==
- Slaviša Dugić at fussballdaten.de (in German)
- Modriča players profiles at Modriča official site.
