= Darko Vukašinović =

Montenegrin footballer

Personal information
- Date of birth: 5 March 1985 (age 41)
- Place of birth: Titograd, SFR Yugoslavia
- Height: 1.87 m (6 ft 2 in)
- Position: Defender

Youth career
- 1995–2003: Budućnost Podgorica

Senior career*
Years	Team	Apps	(Gls)
2003	Budućnost Podgorica	1	
2004–2006	Zeta	48	(0)
2006–2007	Petrovac	14	(0)
2007	Slavia Sofia	0	(0)
2007–2008	Lovćen	25	(0)
2008–2009	Jedinstvo Bijelo Polje	3	(0)

International career
2002	FR Yugoslavia U17		
- * Club domestic league appearances and goals

Darko Vukašinović (Serbian: Дарко Вукашиновић; born 5 March 1985) is a Montenegrin former professional footballer who played as a defender.

== Club career ==
Prior to his transfer to Slavia Sofia, he played for FK Budućnost Podgorica and FK Zeta. He moved to Slavia on a free transfer, as he had a contract with the FK Zeta, helping them to win the league.

== International career ==
He was part of the FR Yugoslavia team that played at the 2002 UEFA European Under-17 Championship.
