= Karim Azizou =

Moroccan football right back (born 1985)

Personal information
- Full name: Karim Azizou
- Date of birth: January 20, 1985 (age 41)
- Place of birth: Périgueux, France
- Height: 1.77 m (5 ft 9 1/2 in)
- Position: Right back

Team information
- Current team: Maghreb Fez

Youth career
- ? – 2005: Bordeaux

Senior career*
Years	Team	Apps	(Gls)
2005–2006	Triestina	20	(0)
2007	Cremonese	15	(1)
2007–08	Lucchese	13	(0)
2008–	Maghreb Fez		

International career
- France U-17
- Morocco Olympics
Medal record
Men's football
Representing France
UEFA European Under-17 Championship
Runner-up	2002 Denmark
- * Club domestic league appearances and goals as of 08:50, 2 November 2009 (UTC)

Karim Azizou (Arabic: كريم عزيزو) (born 20 January 1985) is a Moroccan football (soccer) right back. He currently plays for Maghreb Fez.

Azizou signed a three-year contract with Triestina in summer 2005.

He joined Cremonese of Serie C1 in January 2007. He then left for Lucchese in summer 2007.
