= Gualter Bilro =

Portuguese footballer

Personal information
- Full name: Gualter Aurélio Oliveira Bilro
- Date of birth: 22 November 1985 (age 40)
- Place of birth: Amadora, Portugal
- Height: 1.82 m (6 ft 0 in)
- Position: Defensive midfielder

Youth career
- 1996–2001: Farense
- 2001–2004: Porto

Senior career*
Years	Team	Apps	(Gls)
2004–2005	Quarteirense		
2005–2006	Madalena	12	(0)
2006–2008	Lagoa	28	(0)
2008–2009	Louletano	12	(0)
2009	→ Pinhalnovense (loan)	17	(1)
2009–2010	Beira-Mar Monte Gordo	29	(0)
2010–2016	Farense	135	(4)
2016–2017	Almancilense	25	(1)
2017	Njarðvík		
2018–2022	11 Esperanças	26	(2)
Total		284	(8)

International career
2001	Portugal U15	1	(0)
2001–2002	Portugal U17	3	(0)
2004	Portugal U19	2	(0)
- * Club domestic league appearances and goals

Gualter Aurélio Oliveira Bilro (born 22 November 1985) is a Portuguese former footballer who played as a defensive midfielder.

He amassed Segunda Liga totals of 81 matches and two goals over three seasons, with Farense which he also represented at two other levels of Portuguese football. Abroad, he played in Iceland.

== Club career ==
Bilro was born in Amadora, Lisbon District, and raised in the Algarve. He began his career as a youth with S.C. Farense, and completed his development at FC Porto.

Bilro spent his first nine seasons as a senior competing in the third and fourth divisions, in representation of C.D.R. Quarteirense, F.C. da Madalena, G.D. Lagoa, Louletano DC, C.D. Pinhalnovense, GD Beira-Mar and Farense. At the end of the 2012–13 season, he achieved promotion to the Segunda Liga with the latter club.

On 27 July 2013, Bilro made his debut as a professional, featuring the full 90 minutes in a 1–0 home win against C.D. Santa Clara in the first stage of the Taça da Liga. His maiden appearance in the second tier took place on 21 August, when he was booked and played the entire 0–0 draw away to Leixões SC. He scored his first goal in the competition on 7 December of the same year, helping the hosts to defeat S.L. Benfica B 3–1.

Bilro left the Estádio de São Luís in June 2016, later remarking "It was great to play for Farense. I represented the club I love". During his stint, he was nicknamed Spartacus by his teammates and also acted as team captain.

Aged 31, Bilro joined Icelandic club Njarðvík FC in 2017 after a spell with S.R. Almancilense. During his short tenure, he won the 2. deild karla championship.

== International career ==
Bilro was part of the Portuguese under-17 squad at the 2002 UEFA European Championship alongside Cristiano Ronaldo, in a group-stage exit in Denmark.
