= Henry Siqueira-Barras =

Brazilian-Swiss footballer (born 1985)

Henri Siqueira
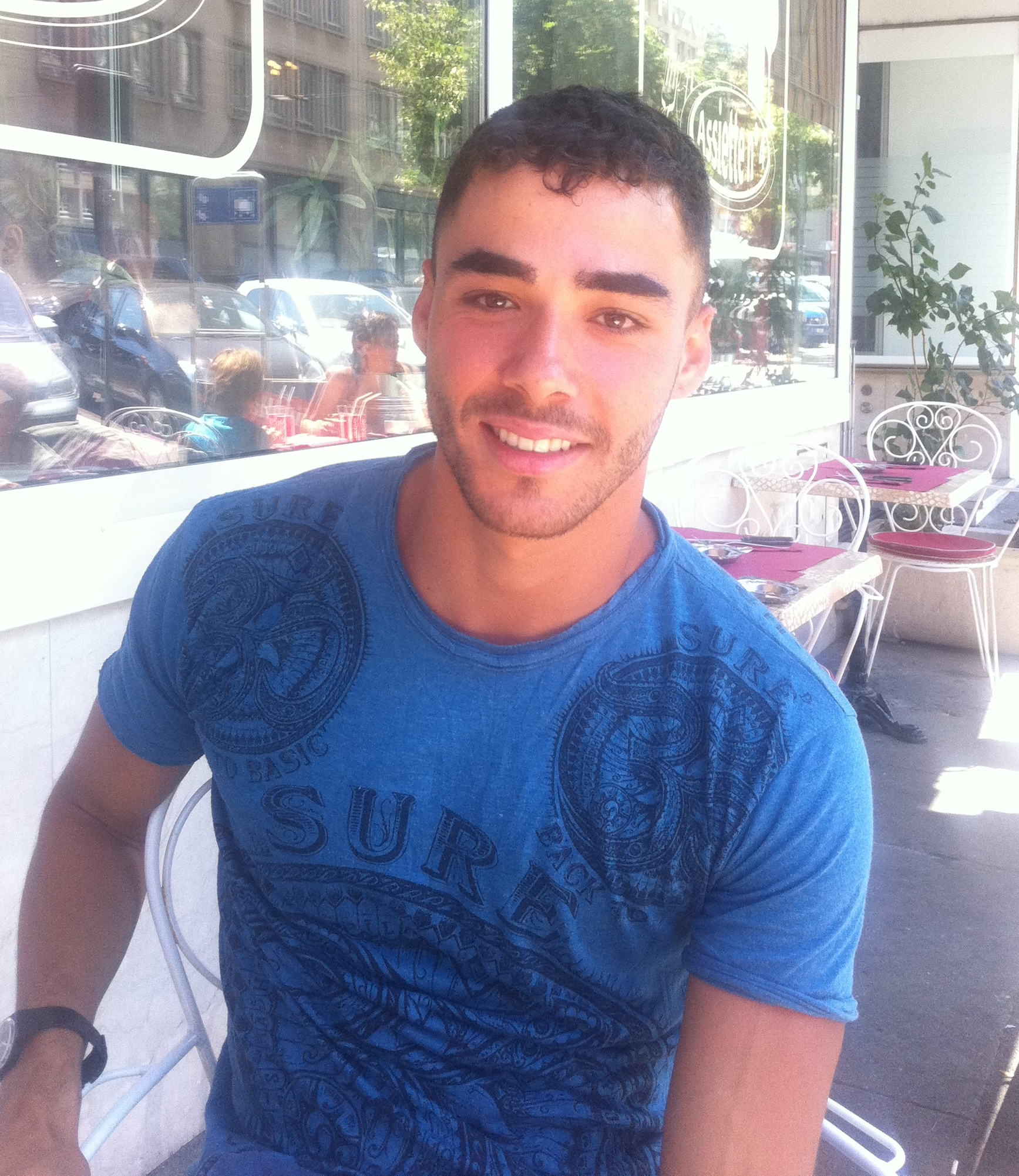

Personal information
- Full name: Henri-Georges Siqueira-Barras
- Date of birth: 15 January 1985 (age 41)
- Place of birth: Brazil
- Height: 1.80 m (5 ft 11 in)
- Position: Central defender

Youth career
- 1994–1999: Rapid Lugano
- 1999–2002: Lugano

Senior career*
Years	Team	Apps	(Gls)
2002–2003	Grasshopper B	10	(0)
2003	Grasshopper	2	(0)
2004	FC Winterthur	6	(0)
2005	Neuchâtel Xamax	4	(0)
2005–2006	FC Locarno	17	(0)
2006	Argeş Piteşti	5	(0)
2007	Gloria Bistriţa	10	(0)
2007–2008	Enosis Neon Paralimni	12	(0)
2008–2012	AC Bellinzona	71	(0)
2012	FC Chiasso	14	(1)
Total		151	(1)

International career
2002	Switzerland U-17	3	(0)
2004	Switzerland U-19	4	(0)
2004–2006	Switzerland U-20	13	(0)
Medal record
Men's football
Representing Switzerland
UEFA European Under-17 Championship
Winner	2002 Denmark
- * Club domestic league appearances and goals as of March 2013

Henri-Georges Siqueira-Barras is a retired Brazilian-Swiss football player. Siqueira is a former youth international and was in the Swiss U-17 squad that won the 2002 U-17 European Championships.

== Honours ==
Switzerland U-17

- UEFA U-17 European Championship: 2002
