= Boban Maksimović =

Swiss footballer (born 1985)

Personal information
- Full name: Boban Maksimović
- Date of birth: 10 October 1985 (age 41)
- Place of birth: Loznica, SFR Yugoslavia
- Height: 1.74 m (5 ft 9 in)
- Position: Midfielder

Youth career
- Young Boys

Senior career*
| Years | Team | Apps | (Gls) |
| 2003–2005 | Young Boys | 14 | (1) |
| 2005 | Baden | 13 | (2) |
| 2006–2008 | Winterthur | 48 | (11) |
| 2008 | Red Star Belgrade | 0 | (0) |
| 2009 | Vojvodina | 5 | (0) |
| 2010 | Biel-Bienn | 7 | (1) |
| 2011–2012 | Breitenrain Bern | 23 | (2) |

International career
| 2002 | Switzerland U17 | | |
| | Switzerland U20 | 3 | (1) |
Medal record
Men's football
Representing Switzerland
UEFA European Under-17 Championship
| Winner | 2002 Denmark |
- * Club domestic league appearances and goals

Boban Maksimović (Serbian Cyrillic: Бобан Максимовић; born 10 October 1985) is a Swiss football midfielder.

== Career ==
He signed by FC Winterthur on 31 January 2006 having previously played for BSC Young Boys and FC Baden.

He played a game in UEFA Champions League 2004–05 second qualifying round.

In summer 2008, he moved to Serbia, where he signed with former European champions Red Star Belgrade. After not getting much chances there, he moved to another Serbian SuperLiga club FK Vojvodina where he played until January 2010 when he returned to Switzerland, this time to play with FC Biel-Bienne.

In summer 2011 he moved to FC Breitenrain Bern.

== International career ==
Maksimović is a former youth international and was in the Swiss U-17 squad that won the 2002 UEFA European Under-17 Championship.

== Honours ==
- UEFA European Under-17 Championship: 2002
