= Vili Savolainen =

Finnish footballer (born 1985)

Personal information
- Date of birth: 25 October 1985 (age 40)
- Place of birth: Helsinki, Finland
- Height: 1.87 m (6 ft 2 in)
- Positions: Defensive midfielder; defender

Team information
- Current team: Tampere United

Senior career*
Years	Team	Apps	(Gls)
2003–2007	Helsingin Jalkapalloklubi	107	(15)
2008–	Tampere United	62	(2)
- * Club domestic league appearances and goals as of 4 March 2011

Vili Savolainen (born 25 October 1985) is a Finnish football player, who plays as defensive midfielder or a defender.

Savolainen currently represents Tampere United of Veikkausliiga. He started playing football for Helsingin Jalkapalloklubi when he was five years old and made his debut for the senior team, when he was 17 years old. He has also played for the Finland national team at different junior levels.
