= Mary Vanderlinde =

American politician

Member of the South Dakota House of Representatives
- In office 1985–1994

Personal details
- Born: February 17, 1929 Sioux City, Iowa, U.S.
- Died: March 17, 2005 (aged 76)
- Party: Democratic
- Education: Augustana College

Mary Vanderlinde (February 17, 1929 – March 17, 2005) was an American politician. She served as a Democratic member of the South Dakota House of Representatives.

== Life and career ==
Vanderlinde was born in Sioux City, Iowa. She attended Presentation School of Nursing and Augustana College.

Vanderlinde served in the South Dakota House of Representatives from 1985 to 1994.

Vanderlinde died on March 17, 2005, at the age of 76.
