= Christian Schlauri =

Swiss footballer (born 1985)

Personal information
- Full name: Christian Schlauri
- Date of birth: 30 March 1985 (age 41)
- Place of birth: Basel, Switzerland
- Height: 1.81 m (5 ft 11 1/2 in)
- Position: Defender

Team information
- Current team: Frauenfeld
- Number: 5

Senior career*
Years	Team	Apps	(Gls)
2002–2004	Winterthur	29	(1)
2003–2005	Basel-U21	42	(4)
2005–2007	Concordia Basel	51	(0)
2007–2010	Schaffhausen	68	(4)
2010–2013	Servette	23	(1)
2013–2014	Lugano	4	(0)
2014–2016	Tuggen	40	(0)
2016–2017	FC United Zürich	10	(1)
2017–	Frauenfeld	30	(0)

International career
- Switzerland U-17
Medal record
Men's football
Representing Switzerland
UEFA European Under-17 Championship
Winner	2002 Denmark
- * Club domestic league appearances and goals as of 12 June 2019

Christian Schlauri (born 30 March 1985) is a Swiss footballer who plays for FC Frauenfeld. He is a former youth international and was in the Swiss U-17 squad that won the 2002 U-17 European Championships.

== Honours ==
- UEFA U-17 European Champion: 2002
