= Luwamo Garcia =

Angolan footballer

Personal information
- Full name: Luwamo Garcia
- Date of birth: 1 May 1985 (age 41)
- Place of birth: Luanda, Angola
- Height: 1.67 m (5 ft 6 in)
- Position: Forward

Youth career
- Standard Liège
- Genk

Senior career*
Years	Team	Apps	(Gls)
2003–2004	Genk	3	(0)
2004–2006	VVV-Venlo	67	(13)
2006–2009	RKC Waalwijk	80	(18)
2009–2011	Ethnikos Asteras	39	(30)
2011	Alki Larnaca	13	(2)
2012–2013	Caála		
2013–2014	Progresso Sambizanga		
2014–2016	Tilleur		
2016–2017	Bressoux		
2017	Star Fléron		

International career
2000–2001	Belgium U16	11	(2)
2001–2002	Belgium U17	9	(3)
2002–2003	Belgium U18	15	(1)
2003–2005	Belgium U19	19	(2)
2005	Belgium U20	2	(0)
2004–2005	Belgium U21	4	(0)
- * Club domestic league appearances and goals as of 14 June 2010 (UTC)

Luwamo Garcia (born 1 May 1985) is a former professional footballer. Born in Angola, he is a Belgian youth international and has appeared at all levels from under-16 to under-21. At club level, he played in Belgium, the Netherlands, Greece, Cyprus and his native Angola.

== Career ==
Born in Luanda, Angola, Garcia made his debut in professional football, being part of the Genk squad in the 2003–04 season. He also played for VVV-Venlo before joining RKC Waalwijk. Afterwards he played in Angola for Caála and Progresso Sambizanga. From January 2015, Garcia played for Tilleur in Belgium. In 2016, he moved to Bressoux. During a practice session, he suffered a transient ischemic attack which left him impaired in speech and movement for some time after. This forced him to retire from football.

== Post-retirement ==
After his retirement from professional football, Garcia owned a transport company and worked for FedEx and TNT Express.
