= Jani Koivisto =

Finnish footballer (born 1985)

Personal information
- Full name: Jani Koivisto
- Date of birth: 25 February 1985 (age 41)
- Place of birth: Finland
- Height: 1.78 m (5 ft 10 in)
- Position: Forward

Senior career*
Years	Team	Apps	(Gls)
- FF Jaro
- FC Viikingit
- * Club domestic league appearances and goals

Jani Koivisto (born 25 February 1985) is a Finnish professional footballer who currently plays for FC Viikingit in Helsinki, Finland.
