= Wensten van der Linde =

South African footballer

Personal information
- Full name: Wensten van der Linde
- Date of birth: 29 April 1990 (age 36)
- Place of birth: South Africa
- Height: 1.88 m (6 ft 2 in)
- Position: Goalkeeper

Team information
- Current team: TS Galaxy
- Number: 1

Youth career
- Stars of Africa Football Academy

Senior career*
Years	Team	Apps	(Gls)
2013–2016	Milano United	24	(0)
2016–2018	University of Pretoria	32	(0)
2018–2020	Mbombela United	45	(0)
2020–	TS Galaxy	18	(0)
- * Club domestic league appearances and goals as of 1 August 2023

Wensten van der Linde (born 29 April 1990) is a South African soccer player who plays as a goalkeeper for Premier Soccer League club TS Galaxy.

== Club career ==
Van der Linde started his career at NFD club Milano United in 2013, joining from Stars of Africa football academy.

Van der Linde joined University of Pretoria nicknamed AmaTuks in 2016.

He was signed by Mbombela United in 2018.

He joined TS Galaxy in October 2020 from Mbombela United.
