= Guillaume Plessis =

French footballer (born 1985)

Personal information
- Date of birth: 16 January 1985 (age 41)
- Place of birth: Saint-Denis, Réunion
- Height: 6 ft 2 in (1.88 m)
- Position: Defensive midfielder

Youth career
- –2004: Lens

Senior career*
Years	Team	Apps	(Gls)
2004–2005	Lens	0	(0)
2005	Everton	0	(0)
2005–2007	Clermont	9	(0)
2007–2008	Boulogne	2	(0)
2008–2010	Martigues	0	(0)
2010–2011	Béziers	17	(0)

International career
2002	France U17	3	(1)
- * Club domestic league appearances and goals

Guillaume Plessis (born 16 January 1985) is a former professional footballer who played as a midfielder.

== Club career ==
Plessis started his career with Lens. In January 2005, he joined Premier League club Everton on a six-month deal but failed to make a first team appearance. He has also played for Clermont Foot and Martigues.

== International career ==
Plessis was part of the France U17 squad for the 2002 UEFA European Under-17 Championship.

== Personal life ==
Plessis's younger brother Damien was also a professional footballer.
