= Michal Kropík =

Czech footballer (born 1985)

Personal information
- Date of birth: 20 February 1985 (age 41)
- Place of birth: Czechoslovakia
- Height: 1.86 m (6 ft 1 in)
- Position: Defender

Senior career*
Years	Team	Apps	(Gls)
2003–2004	Sparta Prague B		
2004–2011	Viktoria Žižkov		
2007	→ Příbram (loan)	7	(0)
2008–2009	→ Bohemians (Střížkov) (loan)	12	(0)
2009–2010	→ Vlašim (loan)	29	(2)
2012	Viktoria Žižkov	14	(1)
2012	Chomutov		
2013	Vlašim	6	(0)
2013–2014	UVB Vöcklamarkt	29	(1)

International career
2000	Czech Republic U16	10	(1)
2001	Czech Republic U15	5	(0)
2001–2002	Czech Republic U17	18	(2)
2002–2003	Czech Republic U18	7	(0)
- * Club domestic league appearances and goals

Michal Kropík (born 20 February 1985) is a Czech former professional football player who made 49 appearances in the Czech First League. He represented his country at youth international level.

== Career ==
Ahead of the 2008–09 season, Kropík joined Czech First League side Bohemians (Střížkov) on loan for the season. He returned to Žižkov at the end of the season after helping Bohemians to an 11th-place finish in the league. Kropik was one of seven players to leave Viktoria Žižkov before the start of the 2011–12 season.

After playing in Ukraine and Indonesia, Kropík returned to Žižkov, signing a new contract in January 2012. In April 2012, he scored an equaliser in an away match against Baník Ostrava, which ultimately finished 3–1 to the home team. After the end of the season, in which Žižkov were relegated to the second tier, Kropik joined FC Chomutov of the third-tier Bohemian Football League. In the winter break of the 2012–13 season, Kropík signed for Vlašim, who were attempting to avoid relegation from the second tier. In the summer of 2013, Kropík signed for Austrian side UVB Vöcklamarkt of the Austrian Regionalliga Central.
