= Raphael Schaschko =

German footballer

Personal information
- Date of birth: 7 June 1985 (age 41)
- Place of birth: Herrenberg, West Germany
- Position: Defender

Youth career
- 1990–2000: Phönix Pfalzgrafenweiler
- 2000–2004: VfB Stuttgart

Senior career*
Years	Team	Apps	(Gls)
2004–2007	VfB Stuttgart II	56	(1)
2007–2010	SpVgg Unterhaching	82	(2)
2010–2012	Chemnitzer FC	44	(0)
2012–2013	SGS Großaspach	24	(2)
2013–2015	SSV Reutlingen		

International career
- Germany Youth
- * Club domestic league appearances and goals

Raphael Schaschko (born 7 June 1985) is a German former professional footballer who played as a defender.
