= Steve Müller =

German footballer

Personal information
- Date of birth: 16 May 1985 (age 41)
- Place of birth: Halle, East Germany
- Height: 1.85 m (6 ft 1 in)
- Position: Defender

Youth career
- –1999: VfL Gräfenhainichen
- 1999–2003: 1. FC Magdeburg

Senior career*
Years	Team	Apps	(Gls)
2003–2005	1. FC Magdeburg	62	(1)
2005–2007	VfL Wolfsburg	65	(12)
2007–2008	VfB Lübeck	30	(3)
2008–2009	Erzgebirge Aue	8	(0)
2009–2010	Wuppertaler SV	43	(1)
2010–2014	Holstein Kiel	84	(5)
2014	Hertha BSC II	12	(0)
2014–2016	TSG Neustrelitz	58	(4)
2016–2020	FSV 63 Luckenwalde	75	(5)
Total		437	(31)

Managerial career
- 2020–: FSV 63 Luckenwalde (assistant)
- * Club domestic league appearances and goals

Steve Müller (born 16 May 1985) is a German former professional footballer who played as a defender.
