= Itabuna =

Municipality of Bahia, Brazil

- Municipality
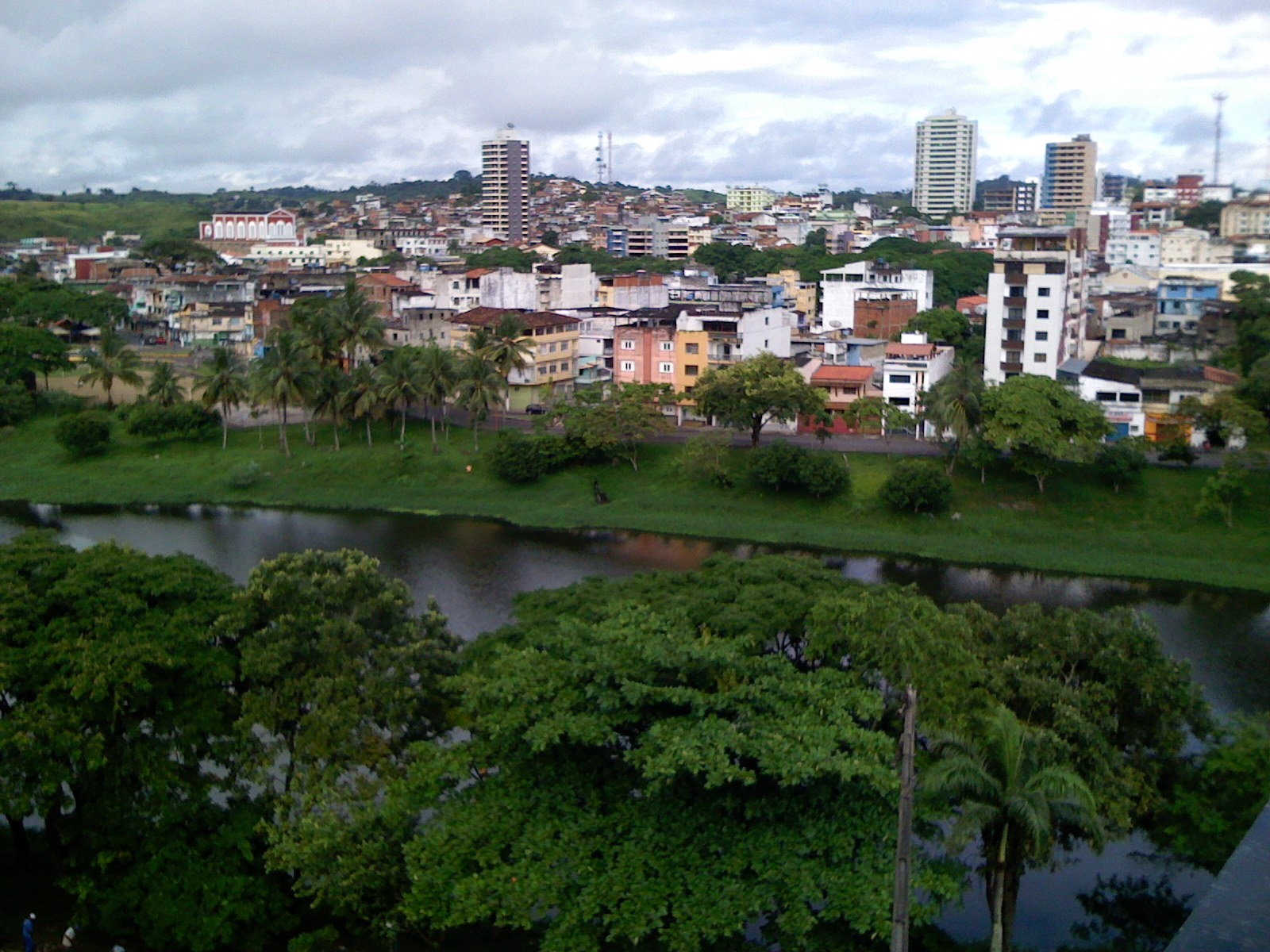
- Aerial view of Itabuna

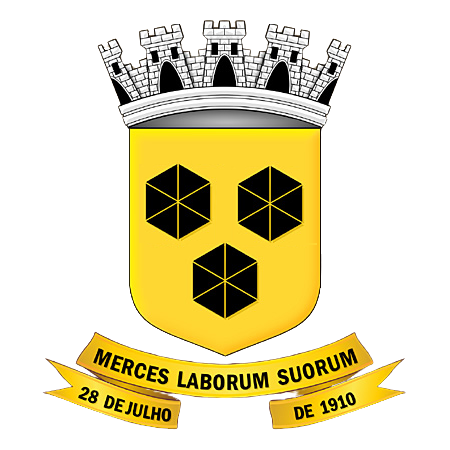
- Flag Coat of arms

- Location of Itabuna in Bahia

- Location within Brazil
- Coordinates: 14°47′09″S 39°16′48″W
- Country: Brazil
- State: Bahia
- Meso-region: Sul Baiano
- Micro-Region: Ilhéus-Itabuna
- Established: July 28, 1910

Government
  - Mayor: Augusto Castro

Area
  - Total: 401 km^{2} (155 sq mi)

Population (2022 Brazilian Census)
  - Total: 186,708
  - Estimate (2025): 196,344
  - Density: 466/km^{2} (1,210/sq mi)
- Demonym: itabunense
- Time zone: UTC−3 (BRT)
- Postal code: 44300-xxx
- Area code(s): +55 73
- Website: itabuna.ba.gov.br

Itabuna is a municipality in Bahia, Brazil. It is the 6th largest city in Bahia by population after Salvador, Feira de Santana, Camaçari, Vitória da Conquista, and Juazeiro. It had an estimated 186,708 residents in the 2022 Census. Itabuna covers a total area of 401 square kilometres (155 mi^{2}) and has a population density of 550 residents per square kilometer.

== Etymology ==
The name "Itabuna" derives from Tupiniquim itáabuna, meaning father of stone (itá, stone + abuna, father). This name refers to a rock the Tupiniquim thought reminded them of a father and was bigger than the other stones around.

== History ==
The Portuguese arrived in the 16th century. The region was inhabited by the Tupiniquim, an indigenous group of the larger Tupi people. The Portuguese established the Captaincy of Ilhéus in the region, but it failed due to attacks by the nomadic Aimoré people, who emerged from the interior of Brazil in the 1550s. Settlement began when the region served as the main crossing point for drovers heading to Vitória da Conquista. In the region crossed by the Cachoeira River, Arraial de Tabocas emerged in 1857, in the middle of a forest that had not yet been explored at the time. The name Tabocas, according to tradition, is due to a huge jequitibá, whose felling had been disputed, being the 'pau da taboca', that is, the swidden that opened. The region was populated by non-native Brazilians from 1867, mainly by migrants from Sergipe. Félix Severino de Oliveira, later known as Félix Severino do Amor Divino, and José Firmino Alves, his cousin, founded Fazenda Marimbeta, a farm, in the municipality. A street remains with the name in the Conceição of Itabuna. Itabuna was emancipated from Ilhéus in 1910. In 1978, the city became the seat of the Roman Catholic Diocese of Itabuna.

Itabuna used to be very wealthy due to the number of cacao farms around it. It was once the second-largest exporter of cacao in Brazil. The cacao boom, however, was short-lived due to a disease called witch's broom. The economy of Itabuna is now weak compared to cities of similar size and location.

In December 2021, the town was flooded after two dams burst.

== Economy ==
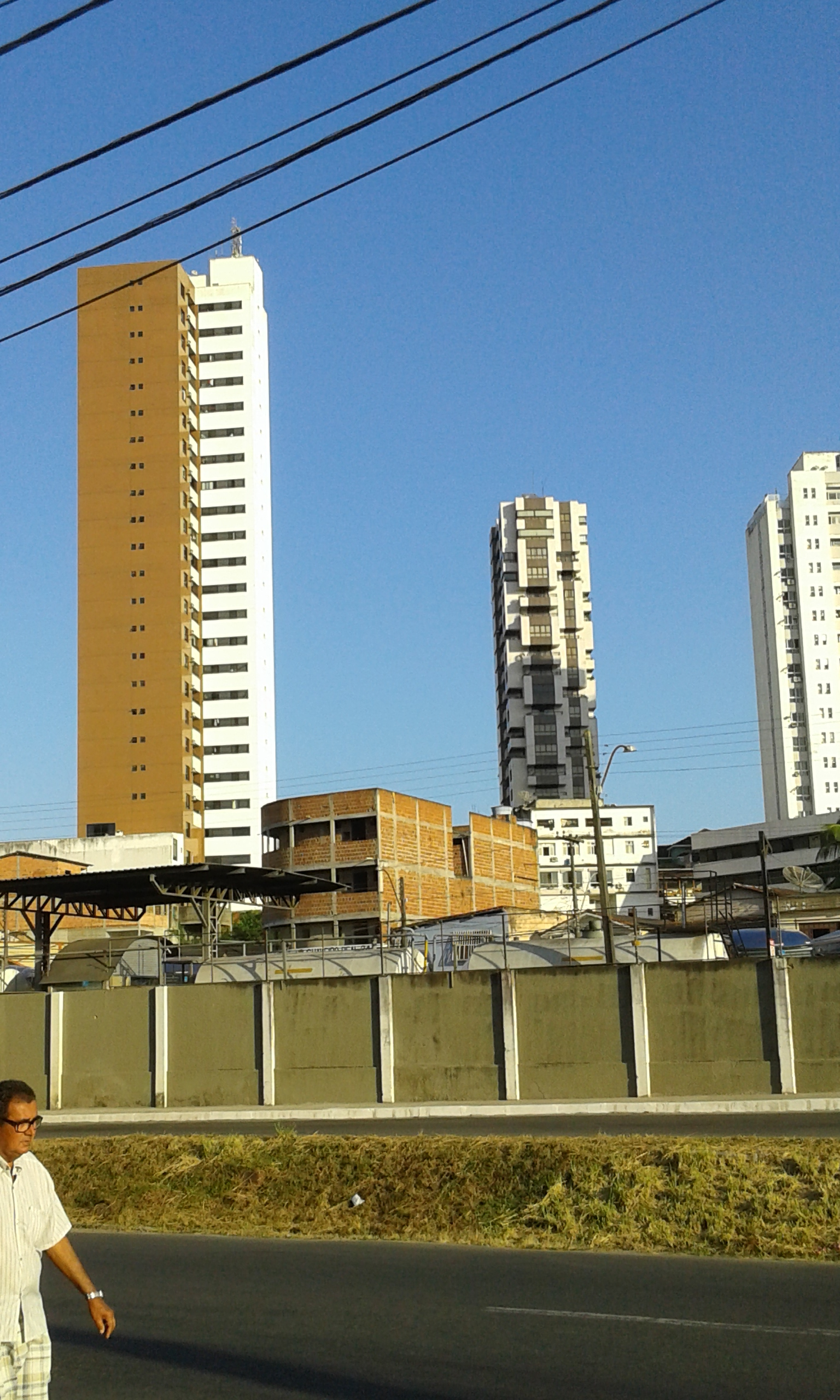
Avenue Amélia Amado, downtown. Buildings in the background

Itabuna is a regional center of commerce, industry and services, along with its neighbour Ilhéus. Its economic importance grew during the golden era of cocoa cultivation. Thanks to its fertile soil, the city became the second-biggest producer of cocoa in Brazil, exporting to the United States and Europe. After the devastation of crops caused by the fungus Crinipellis perniciosa (which causes a disease known as witch's broom), which led to a profound crisis in its economy, the city began to seek diversification of its economic activities. Nowadays, Itabuna is one of the most important trade points located along the BR-101 Highway in Bahia.

== Sport ==
Itabuna EC is the local association football team.

== Climate ==
Climate data for Itabuna
Month	Jan	Feb	Mar	Apr	May	Jun	Jul	Aug	Sep	Oct	Nov	Dec	Year
Mean daily maximum °C (°F)	30.1 (86.2)	30.3 (86.5)	30.1 (86.2)	28.8 (83.8)	27.2 (81.0)	26.1 (79.0)	25.3 (77.5)	25.7 (78.3)	26.7 (80.1)	28.0 (82.4)	28.6 (83.5)	29.3 (84.7)	28.0 (82.4)
Daily mean °C (°F)	25.6 (78.1)	26.0 (78.8)	26.0 (78.8)	24.9 (76.8)	23.4 (74.1)	22.4 (72.3)	21.7 (71.1)	21.8 (71.2)	22.8 (73.0)	24.0 (75.2)	24.5 (76.1)	25.1 (77.2)	24.0 (75.2)
Mean daily minimum °C (°F)	21.4 (70.5)	21.6 (70.9)	21.7 (71.1)	21.1 (70.0)	19.7 (67.5)	18.6 (65.5)	17.8 (64.0)	17.7 (63.9)	18.7 (65.7)	20.0 (68.0)	20.8 (69.4)	21.3 (70.3)	20.0 (68.0)
Average precipitation mm (inches)	111.6 (4.39)	135.0 (5.31)	113.7 (4.48)	123.4 (4.86)	87.9 (3.46)	102.1 (4.02)	111.3 (4.38)	76.9 (3.03)	99.7 (3.93)	111.4 (4.39)	96.4 (3.80)	155.1 (6.11)	1,356.7 (53.41)
Source: Universidade Federal de Campina Grande

== Notable people ==
- Jorge Amado, writer
- André Silva Carvalho, footballer
