= André Carvalho (Brazilian footballer) =

Brazilian footballer (born 1984)

Personal information
- Full name: André Silva Carvalho
- Date of birth: September 18, 1984 (age 42)
- Place of birth: Itabuna, Brazil
- Position: Defender

Team information
- Current team: NK Imotski
- Number: 2

Senior career*
Years	Team	Apps	(Gls)
2006	Itabuna		
2006	Široki Brijeg		
2007–	NK Imotski	4	(0)
- * Club domestic league appearances and goals

André Silva Carvalho (born 18 September 1984 in Itabuna) is a Brazilian football player. He currently plays for NK Imotski in Druga HNL.
