= Herald Van der Linde =

Dutch historian and businessman

Herald van der Linde
- Born: Netherlands
- Education: University of Groningen
- Occupations: Historian, equity strategist
- Employer: HSBC
- Known for: Expertise in Asian equity markets and authoring books on Indonesian history
- Notable work: Jakarta: A History of a Misunderstood City (2020)

Herald Van der Linde is a Dutch historian and financial analyst based in Hong Kong. He currently works at HSBC as head of equity strategy for Asia-Pacific.

== Career ==
Van der Linde authored two books focused on Indonesia, including on Jakarta, and another on the Majapahit Empire. In 2022, Van der Linde published Jakarta: History of a Misunderstood City, focusing on the city's history, particularly through the lens of its kampungs. In 2024, Van der Linde published Majapahit: Intrigue, Betrayal and War in Indonesia’s Greatest Empire, which received positive critical reception by The Jakarta Post and the Asian Review of Books. He co-hosts HSBC's podcast Under the Banyan Tree.

== Publications ==
- A Very Good Year: To Learn About Wine (2012)
- Another Very Good Year To Learn About Wine (2013)
- Jakarta: History of a Misunderstood City (2022)
- Asia’s Stock Markets from the Ground Up (2022)
- Majapahit: Intrigue, Betrayal and War in Indonesia’s Greatest Empire (2024)
- Srivijaya: Power, Trade, and Faith in Indonesia's First Maritime Empire (2026)
