= Mark van den Boogaart =

Dutch footballer (born 1985)

Personal information
- Full name: Mark van den Boogaart
- Date of birth: 3 September 1985 (age 41)
- Place of birth: Rotterdam, Netherlands
- Height: 1.75 m (5 ft 9 in)
- Position: Midfielder

Team information
- Current team: AFC
- Number: 6

Youth career
- Feyenoord

Senior career*
Years	Team	Apps	(Gls)
2004–2005	Feyenoord	0	(0)
2005–2007	Sevilla B	25	(0)
2006	→ Dordrecht (loan)	3	(0)
2007–2009	NEC	2	(0)
2009–2010	Murcia	0	(0)
2010–2012	Barendrecht	49	(1)
2012–2015	Rijnsburgse Boys	75	(3)
2015–2018	AFC	51	(0)
Total		205	(4)
- * Club domestic league appearances and goals as of 14 April 2018

Mark van den Boogaart (born 3 September 1985) is a Dutch footballer who plays for Amsterdamsche FC as a midfielder.

== Club career ==
A native of Rotterdam, van den Boogaart started playing at local giants Feyenoord, spending the following two years with Sevilla FC's reserves in the third division, with the Spaniards in turn loaning him back to his country with FC Dordrecht in the summer of 2006.

In the 2007–08 season, van den Boogaart finally made his Eredivisie debuts, with NEC Nijmegen, but he only played two league games in two years as he was seriously injured. Released in May 2009, he returned to Spain and signed for Real Murcia, failing to appear in any competitive matches.

Afterwards, van den Boogaart returned to his homeland and played in the newly created Topklasse, first spending two seasons with BVV Barendrecht then joining Rijnsburgse Boys in 2012. In the 2015 January transfer window, he moved to Amsterdamsche FC.

== Personal life ==
In January 2023, van den Boogaart went missing for a month with his former girlfriend citing he had been dealing with mental health issues for a longer period of time.
