= Admir Haznadar =

Bosnian-Dutch footballer

Personal information
- Date of birth: July 25, 1985 (age 41)
- Place of birth: Sarajevo, SFR Yugoslavia
- Height: 1.79 m (5 ft 10 in)
- Position: Left winger

Youth career
- RBC
- 2000–2005: PSV

Senior career*
Years	Team	Apps	(Gls)
2005–2007	KVSK United		
2007–2008	AA Gent	7	(1)
2008–2010	Tienen	13	(3)
2010	Tongeren		
2010–2011	Gemert	22	(2)
2011	KV Turnhout	4	(0)
2012	FC De Kempen		
2012–2013	KFC Lille		
2014–2015	Witgoor Sport Dessel		

International career
2001–2002	Netherlands U17	9	(1)
2003–2004	Netherlands U19	2	(0)
- * Club domestic league appearances and goals

Admir Haznadar (born 25 July 1985) is a Bosnian-Dutch retired footballer who played as a striker, mainly in Belgium.

He joined KV Turnhout in 2011, FC De Kempen in 2012 and in January 2014 Haznadar joined Witgoor Sport Dessel.

== International career ==
Haznadar played twice for the Netherlands national under-19 football team.
