= Nico Van Der Linden =

Belgian footballer

Personal information
- Date of birth: 12 March 1985 (age 41)
- Place of birth: Ekeren, Belgium
- Height: 1.95 m (6 ft 5 in)
- Position: Centre-back

Youth career
- Germinal Beerschot

Senior career*
| Years | Team | Apps | (Gls) |
| 2003–2004 | Beerschot AC | 3 | (0) |
| 2004–2005 | KFCV Geel | 10 | (0) |
| 2005–2008 | Cappellen | 53 | (2) |
| 2008–2011 | Rupel Boom | 86 | (13) |
| 2011–2012 | Hoogstraten | | |
| 2012–2013 | Berchem Sport | | |
| 2013–2015 | Beerschot Wilrijk | | |
| 2016–2017 | KVV Vosselaar | | |
| 2018–2019 | KFC Sint-Lenaarts | | |
| 2019–2021 | VC Herentals | | |
| 2021–2022 | Zandvliet Sport | | |
| Total | | 152 | (15) |
- * Club domestic league appearances and goals

Nico Van Der Linden (born 12 March 1985) is a Belgian former professional footballer who plays as a centre back.

== Career ==
Nico made his debut in Belgian Football with a substitution for K.F.C. Germinal Beerschot in a Belgian First Division game in 2003.

He moved to Belgian Second Division side Verbroedering Geel in 2004. One season later he moved on to Belgian Third Division side Cappellen.

In 2008, he move to K Rupel Boom FC, where in 2009 he extended his contract for an extra season.

Amazingly, for a central defender, he scored 13 goals in the 2009–2010 season, including 4 in the promotion playoffs.
