= Sandro Iashvili =

Georgian footballer

Personal information
- Date of birth: 3 January 1985 (age 41)
- Place of birth: Soviet Union
- Height: 1.85 m (6 ft 1 in)
- Position: Striker

Senior career*
Years	Team	Apps	(Gls)
2001–2003	WIT Georgia Tbilisi	2	(0)
2003–2004	Dinamo Tbilisi	24	(7)
2004–2005	FC Tbilisi	24	(9)
2005–2007	Dinamo Tbilisi	41	(28)
2007–2008	Thun	21	(1)
2008	Sioni Bolnisi	0	(0)
2009	Anzhi Makhachkala	21	(4)
2010–2011	→ Olimpi Rustavi (loan)	18	(5)
2012	Chikhura Sachkhere	1	(0)

International career
2001–2002	Georgia U17	12	(11)
2004–2006	Georgia U21	7	(1)
2004	Georgia	3	(0)
- * Club domestic league appearances and goals

Sandro Iashvili (Georgian: სანდრო იაშვილი; born 3 January 1985) is a retired Georgian football striker.
