= André Carvalho (Portuguese footballer) =

Portuguese footballer

Personal information
- Full name: André Filipe Neves Pereira Pinto Carvalho
- Date of birth: 12 March 1985 (age 41)
- Place of birth: Vila do Conde, Portugal
- Height: 1.78 m (5 ft 10 in)
- Position: Midfielder

Youth career
- 2001–2004: Porto

Senior career*
Years	Team	Apps	(Gls)
2003	Porto B	1	(0)
2004–2005	Esmoriz	11	(0)
2005–2008	Valdevez		
2008–2010	Aves	47	(2)
2010–2011	Varzim	25	(3)
2011–2012	Leixões	12	(0)
2012–2013	Famalicão	22	(3)
2013–2014	Joane	28	(2)
2014–2015	Tirsense	19	(2)
2015–2017	Esposende		

International career
2001–2002	Portugal U17	12	(0)
2002–2003	Portugal U18	7	(0)
2004	Portugal U19	2	(0)
- * Club domestic league appearances and goals

André Filipe Neves Pereira Pinto Carvalho (born 12 March 1985) is a Portuguese footballer who played as a midfielder.
