= Wouter Artz =

Dutch footballer (born 1985)

Personal information
- Date of birth: 14 March 1985 (age 41)
- Place of birth: Woerden, Netherlands
- Height: 1.83 m (6 ft 0 in)
- Position: Defender

Team information
- Current team: Deinze (academy)

Youth career
- VEP
- 1995–2004: Feyenoord

Senior career*
Years	Team	Apps	(Gls)
2004–2006	Feyenoord	0	(0)
2004–2006	→ Excelsior	27	(0)
2006–2009	Cercle Brugge	2	(0)
2009–2010	FC Volendam	11	(0)
2010–2012	Dender	51	(0)
2012–2013	KVK Ieper	2	(0)

Managerial career
- 2013–2015: KVK Westhoek (chief scout)
- 2015–2016: Cercle Brugge (youth)
- 2016–2022: Cercle Brugge (U21)
- 2021: Cercle Brugge (caretaker)
- 2022–: Deinze (academy)
- * Club domestic league appearances and goals

Wouter Artz (born 14 March 1985) is a Dutch football coach and a former player. He is the academy director with the Belgian club Deinze.

== Club career ==
Artz started playing football at local amateur side VEP. When he reached the age of 10, he started playing at the youth academy of Feyenoord. Artz was capped several times as youth international. In the 2004–05 and 2005–06 season, Wouter Artz played for Excelsior in Eerste Divisie, where he in his last season became champions with his team.

=== Cercle Brugge ===
In 2006, he moved to Cercle Brugge, a team playing in the Belgian First division. In his first season with the Bruges side, Artz was tormented by injuries and as a consequence, he did not play a single match that season. In the beginning of his second season, Artz was again not given many match minutes, much to the surprise of the supporters. Artz had to wait until the last match day to make his first appearance. Artz started the match against Charleroi SC.

His contract with Cercle ended in 2009 and was not renewed, he only made 2 more first team appearances in the 2008-09 season. On 11 July 2009 FC Volendam signed the former Cercle Brugge defender on a free transfer for a year with an option for another year, only for him to return to Belgium to play for Dender.

He retired in 2013 due to persistent injuries.
