= Angelika van der Linde =

German statistician

Angelika van der Linde-Ploumbidis (Angelika van der Linde) is a statistician. She earned a Ph.D. in 1982 or 1983 at the Freie Universität Berlin with the dissertation Zur numerischen Behandlung von Versuchsplanungsproblemen für lineare Regressionsmodelle mit korrelierten Beobachtungen .

In addition to her influential work in Bayesian statistical theory, she works in numerical analysis, probability theory and stochastic processes, geophysics and systems theory.
