= Radim Kopecký =

Czech footballer (born 1985)

Personal information
- Date of birth: 7 June 1985 (age 41)
- Place of birth: Czechoslovakia
- Position: Defender

Team information
- Current team: 1. HFK Olomouc
- Number: 21

Senior career*
Years	Team	Apps	(Gls)
2005–2009	Sigma Olomouc	3	(0)
2007–2008	→ Hlučín (loan)		
2008	→ Třinec (loan)	2	(0)
2010–	HFK Olomouc	23	(0)

International career^{‡}
2001–2002	Czech Republic U17	10	(1)
2002–2003	Czech Republic U18	9	(1)
2003	Czech Republic U19	1	(0)
- * Club domestic league appearances and goals as of 30 April 2013 ‡ National team caps and goals as of 30 April 2013

Radim Kopecký (born 7 June 1985) is a Czech footballer, who plays as a midfielder. He currently plays for 1. HFK Olomouc. Kopecký has played in the Gambrinus liga. He has played for his country at youth level.
