= Cédric Kisamba =

French footballer (born 1985)

Personal information
- Full name: Cédric Moya Kisamba
- Date of birth: 25 January 1985 (age 41)
- Place of birth: Kinshasa, Zaire
- Height: 1.80 m (5 ft 11 in)
- Position: Midfielder

Youth career
- –2001: AJ Auxerre

Senior career*
Years	Team	Apps	(Gls)
2001–2006	Auxerre		
2006–2009	Châteauroux	10	(0)
2007–2008	→Stade Lavallois (loan)	35	(1)
2008–2009	→ Beauvais (loan)	-	(-)
2009–2010	Najran		
2010–2012	Cultural Leonesa		
2012–2018	Les Herbiers VF		

International career
2004	France U19		
- * Club domestic league appearances and goals as of July 23, 2008

Cédric Moya Kisamba (born 25 January 1985) is a footballer who plays for French side Les Herbiers VF. Born in Zaire, he represented France at youth level.

== Early life ==
Kisamba acquired French nationality on 6 September 2000, through the collective effect of his parents' naturalization.
