= Petr Kobylík =

Czech footballer

Personal information
- Full name: Petr Kobylík
- Date of birth: 8 May 1985 (age 41)
- Place of birth: Olomouc, Czechoslovakia
- Height: 1.80 m (5 ft 11 in)
- Position: Defender

Team information
- Current team: 1. FC Tatran Prešov

Senior career*
Years	Team	Apps	(Gls)
2003–2007	Sigma Olomouc	4	(0)
2005–2006	→ Kroměříž (loan)	24	(4)
2007–2010	Tatran Prešov	35	(9)
2010	Třinec	5	(0)
2010–	HFK Olomouc		

International career
2000–2001	Czech Republic U15	7	(3)
2001–2002	Czech Republic U17	18	(5)
2002–2003	Czech Republic U18	5	(0)
2002–2004	Czech Republic U19	14	(1)
- * Club domestic league appearances and goals as of 30 June 2010

Petr Kobylík (born 8 May 1985) is a Czech footballer currently under contract for 1. HFK Olomouc.

His brother, David, is also a professional footballer.
