= 2002 UEFA European Under-17 Championship =

2002 UEFA Under-17 Championship
2002 U17-EM i fodbold for mænd

Tournament details
- Host country: Denmark
- Dates: 27 April – 10 May
- Teams: 16

Final positions
- Champions: Switzerland (1st title)
- Runners-up: France
- Third place: England
- Fourth place: Spain

Tournament statistics
- Matches played: 32
- Goals scored: 116 (3.63 per match)
- Top scorer(s): (Spain) Jonathan Soriano (7 goals)
- Best player: (England) Wayne Rooney

The 2002 UEFA European Under-17 Championship was the first edition of UEFA's UEFA European Under-17 Championship after changing the name of the competition. Denmark hosted the championship, during 27 April – 10 May. Players born on or after 1 January 1985 were eligible to participate in this competition. 16 teams entered the competition, and Switzerland defeated France in the final to win the competition for the first time.

== Match Officials ==
A total of 10 referees, 12 assistant referees and 3 fourth officials were appointed for the final tournament.

Referees

- (Slovenia) Robert Krajnc
- (Denmark) Emil Laursen
- (Sweden) Jonas Eriksson
- (France) Damien Ledentu
- (Republic of Ireland) Alan Kelly
- (Romania) Augustus Viorel Constantin
- (Italy) Roberto Rosetti
- (Luxembourg) Luc Wilmes
- (Austria) Gerald Lehner
- (Hungary) Zsolt Szabo

Assistant referees

- (Denmark) Bill René Hansen
- (Belgium) Mark Simons
- (Greece) Dimitrios Papadopoulos
- (Moldova) Anatolie Bodean
- (Spain) Oscar David Martinez Samaniego
- (Denmark) Bo Abildgaard
- (Israel) Danny Krasikov
- (Turkey) Koray Gençerler
- (Denmark) Palle Udsen
- (Estonia) Heigo Niilop
- (Iceland) Gunnar Gylfason
- (England) Darren Drysdale

Fourth officials

- (Denmark) Johnny Rųn
- (Denmark) René Christensen
- (Denmark) Thomas Vejlgaard

== Group stage ==
=== Group A ===
Teams	GP	W	D	L	GF	GA	GD	Pts
England	3	2	1	0	5	2	+3	7
Denmark	3	1	2	0	10	4	+6	5
Netherlands	3	1	1	1	10	7	+3	4
Finland	3	0	0	3	3	15	−12	0

27 April 2002
14:00 CET

Denmark	4–4	Netherlands
Rasmussen 38'; Zimling 47'; Kvist 49'; Lorentzen 83'	Report	John 35', 69'; Blonk 64'; Elmas 76'

Farum Park, Farum
Referee: Damien Ledentu (France)
27 April 2002
15:00 CET

Finland	2–3	England
Ääritalo 1', 51'	Report	Hogg 12'; Smyth 41'; Doherty 68'

Gladsaxe
Referee: Robert Krajnc (Slovenia)

29 April 2002
17:00 CET

Netherlands	0–2	England
	Report	Rooney 32'; Long 53'

Gladsaxe
Referee: Gerald Lehner (Austria)
29 April 2002
17:00 CET

Denmark	6–0	Finland
Kvist 7'; Rasmussen 60', 62', 73', 79', 80'	Report

Farum Park, Farum
Referee: Luc Wilmes (Luxembourg)

1 May 2002
17:00 CET

England	0–0	Denmark
	Report

Hvidovre
Referee: Roberto Rosetti (Italy)
1 May 2002
17:00 CET

Netherlands	6–1	Finland
John 30', 65', 81'; Otten 53'; Elmas 56'; Artz 68' (pen.)	Report	Ääritalo 31'

Køge
Referee: Zsolt Szabó (Hungary)

=== Group B ===
Teams	GP	W	D	L	GF	GA	GD	Pts
Switzerland	3	3	0	0	6	2	+4	9
France	3	1	1	1	3	2	+1	4
Portugal	3	1	0	2	2	4	−2	3
Ukraine	3	0	1	2	2	5	−3	1

28 April 2002
11:00 CET

Portugal	0–2	France
	Report	Khiter 36'; Mandanne 53'

Kongens Lyngby
Referee: Jonas Eriksson (Sweden)
28 April 2002
17:00 CET

Switzerland	3–1	Ukraine
Senderos 4'; Milosavac 5'; Dugić 74'	Report	Kotenko 35'

Køge
Referee: Zsolt Szabó (Hungary)

30 April 2002
11:00 CET

Switzerland	1–0	Portugal
Milosavac 13'	Report

Herfølge
Referee: Alan Kelly (Republic of Ireland)
30 April 2002
11:00 CET

Ukraine	0–0	France
	Report

Valby Idrætspark, Copenhagen
Referee: Augustus Constantin (Romania)

2 May 2002
11:00 CET

France	1–2	Switzerland
Bru 67'	Report	Burki 23' (pen.); Dugić 26'

Herfølge
Referee: Emil Laursen (Denmark)
2 May 2002
11:00 CET

Ukraine	1–2	Portugal
Aliyev 63' (pen.)	Report	Pedro Araújo 56'; Ivanildo 83'

Valby Idrætspark, Copenhagen
Referee: Robert Krajnc (Slovenia)

=== Group C ===
Teams	GP	W	D	L	GF	GA	GD	Pts
Spain	3	3	0	0	13	4	+9	9
FR Yugoslavia	3	2	0	1	10	9	+1	6
Czech Republic	3	1	0	2	5	9	−4	3
Moldova	3	0	0	3	7	13	−6	0

27 April 2002
15:00 CET

Spain	4–1	Czech Republic
Soriano 14', 78'; Soldado 42'; Gavilán 79'	Report	Papadopulos 36'

Nykøbing Falster Idrætspark, Nykøbing Falster
Referee: Emil Laursen (Denmark)
27 April 2002
15:00 CET

Moldova	3–6	FR Yugoslavia
Pajović 43' (o.g.); Calincov 48', 71'	Report	Purović 29', 57'; Vukčević 44', 46', 76'; Stančeski 69'

Nakskov Idraetspark, Nakskov
Referee: Alan Kelly (Republic of Ireland)

29 April 2002
11:00 CET

Spain	4–2	Moldova
Soriano 15', 48', 52'; Soldado 42'	Report	Bulgaru 38'; Calincov 44'

Nykøbing Falster Idrætspark, Nykøbing Falster
Referee: Robert Krajnc (Slovenia)
29 April 2002
11:00 CET

Czech Republic	1–3	FR Yugoslavia
Varadi 52'	Report	Vukčević 15'; Purović 61', 63'

Nakskov Idraetspark, Nakskov
Referee: Damien Ledentu (France)

1 May 2002
11:00 CET

Czech Republic	3–2	Moldova
Malchárek 5', 50'; Kobylík 82'	Report	Calincov 26', 82'

Nykøbing Falster Idrætspark, Nykøbing Falster
Referee: Luc Wilmes (Luxembourg)
1 May 2002
11:00 CET

FR Yugoslavia	1–5	Spain
Lečić 82'	Report	Soriano 25', 31'; Gavilán 30'; David Corominas 44'; David Rodriguez 54'

Nakskov Idraetspark, Nakskov
Referee: Gerald Lehner (Austria)

=== Group D ===
Teams	GP	W	D	L	GF	GA	GD	Pts
Germany	3	2	1	0	8	3	5	7
Georgia	3	1	2	0	4	3	1	5
Poland	3	1	1	1	4	3	1	4
Hungary	3	0	0	3	4	11	−7	0

28 April 2002
11:00 CET

Germany	1–1	Georgia
Thomik 65'	Report	Iashvili 46'

Slagelse
Referee: Augustus Constantin (Romania)
28 April 2002
11:00 CET

Hungary	1–3	Poland
Selei 28'	Report	Tarnowski 28'; Szczepan 60' (pen.); Solecki 78'

Roskilde Idrætspark, Roskilde
Referee: Roberto Rosetti (Italy)

30 April 2002
11:00 CET

Georgia	1–1	Poland
Iashvili 52'	Report	Kowalczyk 77'

Roskilde Idrætspark, Roskilde
Referee: Emil Laursen (Denmark)
30 April 2002
17:00 CET

Germany	6–2	Hungary
Westerhoff 38', 41', 54'; Gómez 45', 77'; Schuon 74' (pen.)	Report	Dancs 62' (pen.); Horvath 79'

Slagelse
Referee: Jonas Eriksson (Sweden)

2 May 2002
11:00 CET

Georgia	2–1	Hungary
Iashvili 37', 43' (pen.)	Report	Disztl 19'

Roskilde Idrætspark, Roskilde
Referee: Alan Kelly (Republic of Ireland)
2 May 2002
11:00 CET

Poland	0–1	Germany
	Report	Podolski 76'

Næstved
Referee: Damien Ledentu (France)

== Knockout stage ==
=== Quarterfinals ===
4 May 2002
14:00 CET

England	1–0	FR Yugoslavia
Rooney 7'	Report

Hvidovre
Referee: Gerald Lehner (Austria)

4 May 2002
14:00 CET

Spain	2–2	Denmark
Soldado 19'; Gavilán 29'	Report	Kvist 56'; Brandrup 77'
Penalties
Gavilán (penalty scored); Martínez (penalty missed); Soriano (penalty scored); Silva (penalty scored); Molinero (penalty scored)	4–3	(penalty scored) Rasmussen; (penalty scored) Jakobsen; (penalty missed) Cagara; (penalty scored) Brandrup; (penalty missed) Zimling

Lyngby
Referee: Zsolt Szabó (Hungary)

5 May 2002
17:00 CET

Switzerland	3–0	Georgia
Burki 39', 56'; Ziegler 72'	Report

Slagelse
Referee: Luc Wilmes (Luxembourg)

5 May 2002
17:00 CET

Germany	1–1	France
Cimen 52'	Report	Lejeune 81'
Penalties
Ersan Tekkan (penalty missed); Westerhoff (penalty missed); Rammel (penalty scored); Bork (penalty scored)	2–4	(penalty scored) Plessis; (penalty scored) Houri; (penalty missed) Lejeune; (penalty scored) Zubar; (penalty scored) Mandanne

Næstved
Referee: Augustus Constantin (Romania)

=== Semifinals ===
7 May 2002
17:00 CET

England	0–3	Switzerland
	Report	Maksimović 7', 57'; Milosavac 67'

Herfølge
Referee: Jonas Eriksson (Sweden)

7 May 2002
17:00 CET

Spain	1–1	France
Plessis 78' (o.g.)	Report	Plessis 41' (pen.)
Penalties
Soldado (penalty missed); Silva (penalty scored); Robusté (penalty scored); Merino (penalty missed); Valero (penalty scored)	3–4	(penalty missed) Plessis; (penalty scored) Houri; (penalty scored) Kisamba; (penalty scored) Zubar; (penalty scored) Rippert

Valby Idrætspark, Copenhagen
Referee: Alan Kelly (Republic of Ireland)

=== Third place playoff ===
10 May 2002
11:00 CET

Spain	1–4	England
Gavilán 41'	Report	Routledge 37'; Rooney 40', 52', 72'

Gladsaxe
Referee: Damien Ledentu (France)

=== Final ===
10 May 2002
16:00 CET

France	0–0	Switzerland
	Report
Penalties
Plessis (penalty missed); Houri (penalty missed); Zubar (penalty scored); Kisamba (penalty scored)	2–4	(penalty scored) Barnetta; (penalty scored) Burki; (penalty scored) Preisig; (penalty scored) Ziegler

Farum Park, Farum
Referee: Roberto Rosetti (Italy)
