= 2005 FIFA World Youth Championship squads =

FIFA championship roster

Below are the squads for the 2005 FIFA World Youth Championship tournament in the Netherlands. Players name marked in bold went on to earn full international caps.

== Group A ==
=== Australia ===
Head coach: (Australia) Ange Postecoglou

No.	Pos.	Player	Date of birth (age)	Caps	Goals	Club
1	GK	**Danny Vukovic**	27 March 1985 (aged 20)			(Football Australia) Central Coast Mariners
2	DF	**Mark Milligan**	4 August 1985 (aged 19)			(Football Australia) Sydney FC
3	DF	Trent McClenahan	4 February 1985 (aged 20)			(The Football Association) West Ham United
4	DF	**Adrian Leijer**	25 March 1986 (aged 19)			(Football Australia) Melbourne Victory
5	DF	Jacob Timpano	3 January 1986 (aged 19)			(Football Australia) Sydney FC
6	MF	Stuart Musialik	29 March 1985 (aged 20)			(Football Australia) Newcastle United Jets
7	MF	Vince Lia	18 March 1985 (aged 20)			(Football Australia) Melbourne Victory
8	MF	**Billy Celeski**	14 July 1985 (aged 19)			(Football Australia) Perth Glory
9	FW	Jay Lucas	14 January 1985 (aged 20)			(Football Australia) Marconi Stallions
10	MF	**Kristian Sarkies**	25 October 1986 (aged 18)			(Football Australia) Melbourne Victory
11	MF	Chris Tadrosse	10 September 1985 (aged 19)			(Football Australia) Melbourne Victory
12	GK	Justin Pasfield	30 May 1985 (aged 20)			(Football Australia) Sydney FC
13	DF	Aaron Downes	15 May 1985 (aged 20)			(The Football Association) Chesterfield
14	MF	Spase Dilevski	13 May 1985 (aged 20)			(The Football Association) Tottenham Hotspur
15	DF	Ryan Townsend	2 September 1985 (aged 19)			(The Football Association) Burnley
16	MF	**Ruben Zadkovich**	23 May 1986 (aged 19)			(The Football Association) Notts County
17	FW	Nick Ward	24 March 1985 (aged 20)			(Football Australia) Perth Glory
18	GK	**Adam Federici**	31 January 1985 (aged 20)			(The Football Association) Reading
19	FW	**David Williams**	26 February 1988 (aged 17)			(Football Australia) Queensland Academy
20	MF	James Wesolowski	25 August 1987 (aged 17)			(The Football Association) Leicester City
21	DF	**Nikolai Topor-Stanley**	11 March 1985 (aged 20)			(Football Australia) Belconnen United

=== Benin ===
Head coach: (France) Serge Devèze

No.	Pos.	Player	Date of birth (age)	Caps	Goals	Club
1	GK	Djibril Awalou	23 December 1987 (aged 17)			(Benin Football Federation) Cheminots de l'Ocbn
2	DF	Charaf Chitou	21 September 1987 (aged 17)			(Benin Football Federation) Université Nationale du Bénin FC
3	MF	**Oscar Olou**	16 November 1987 (aged 17)			(Benin Football Federation) Mogas 90
4	DF	Gaulle de Hountonto	20 November 1985 (aged 19)			(Benin Football Federation) Soleil
5	DF	**Traore Moussa**	31 May 1986 (aged 19)			(Benin Football Federation) Buffles du Borgou
6	DF	**Florent Raimy**	7 January 1986 (aged 19)			(French Football Federation) Sedan
7	MF	**Romuald Boco**	8 July 1985 (aged 19)			(French Football Federation) Niort
8	MF	**Mathieu Adeniyi**	26 April 1987 (aged 18)			(French Football Federation) Rennes
9	MF	Thierry Honvo	3 January 1987 (aged 18)			(French Football Federation) Clermont
10	MF	Marvin Aissi	26 March 1985 (aged 20)			(French Football Federation) Troyes
11	FW	**Abou Maïga**	20 September 1985 (aged 19)			(French Football Federation) Créteil
12	FW	Coffi Agbessi	5 December 1985 (aged 19)			(Libyan Football Federation) Olympic Zawiya
13	FW	Youssouf Nassirou	14 November 1986 (aged 18)			(Benin Football Federation) Soleil
14	FW	Bachirou Osséni	15 September 1985 (aged 19)			(Benin Football Federation) Soleil
15	FW	**Razak Omotoyossi**	8 October 1985 (aged 19)			(Benin Football Federation) JS Pobé
16	GK	**Yoann Djidonou**	17 May 1986 (aged 19)			(French Football Federation) Paris FC
17	MF	Medard Zanou	6 June 1987 (aged 18)			(Benin Football Federation) JS Pobé
18	DF	**Séïdath Tchomogo**	13 August 1985 (aged 19)			(Benin Football Federation) Lions de l'Akatora
19	MF	**Jocelyn Ahouéya**	19 December 1985 (aged 19)			(Swiss Football Association) Sion
20	GK	**Benoît Tardieu**	21 January 1986 (aged 19)			(French Football Federation) Auxerre
21	DF	Michael Ainon	9 March 1985 (aged 20)			(The Football Association) Watford

=== Japan ===
Head coach: (Japan) Kiyoshi Okuma

No.	Pos.	Player	Date of birth (age)	Caps	Goals	Club
1	GK	Kenya Matsui	10 September 1985 (aged 19)			(Japan Football Association) Júbilo Iwata
2	DF	**Hiroki Mizumoto**	12 September 1985 (aged 19)			(Japan Football Association) JEF United
3	DF	Mitsuyuki Yoshihiro	4 May 1985 (aged 20)			(Japan Football Association) Sanfrecce Hiroshima
4	DF	Yuzo Kobayashi	15 November 1985 (aged 19)			(Japan Football Association) Kashiwa Reysol
5	DF	Tatsuya Masushima	22 April 1985 (aged 20)			(Japan Football Association) FC Tokyo
6	DF	**Masahiko Inoha**	28 August 1985 (aged 19)			(Japan Football Association) Hannan University
7	MF	Yōhei Kajiyama	24 September 1985 (aged 19)			(Japan Football Association) FC Tokyo
8	MF	Hokuto Nakamura	10 July 1985 (aged 19)			(Japan Football Association) Avispa Fukuoka
9	FW	**Sōta Hirayama**	6 June 1985 (aged 20)			(Japan Football Association) Tsukuba University
10	MF	Shingo Hyodo	29 July 1985 (aged 19)			(Japan Football Association) Waseda University
11	FW	Robert Cullen	7 June 1985 (aged 20)			(Japan Football Association) Júbilo Iwata
12	MF	**Koki Mizuno**	6 September 1985 (aged 19)			(Japan Football Association) JEF United
13	MF	Takuya Kokeguchi	13 July 1985 (aged 19)			(Japan Football Association) Cerezo Osaka
14	MF	**Keisuke Honda**	13 June 1986 (aged 18)			(Japan Football Association) Nagoya Grampus Eight
15	MF	Keisuke Funatani	1 July 1986 (aged 18)			(Japan Football Association) Júbilo Iwata
16	DF	Tomokazu Nagira	17 October 1985 (aged 19)			(Japan Football Association) Avispa Fukuoka
17	DF	**Akihiro Ienaga**	13 June 1986 (aged 18)			(Japan Football Association) Gamba Osaka
18	GK	Kaito Yamamoto	10 July 1985 (aged 19)			(Japan Football Association) Shimizu S-Pulse
19	FW	Shunsuke Maeda	9 June 1986 (aged 19)			(Japan Football Association) Sanfrecce Hiroshima
20	FW	**Takayuki Morimoto**	7 May 1988 (aged 17)			(Japan Football Association) Tokyo Verdy
21	GK	**Shusaku Nishikawa**	18 June 1986 (aged 18)			(Japan Football Association) Oita Trinita

=== Netherlands ===
Head coach: (Netherlands) Foppe de Haan

No.	Pos.	Player	Date of birth (age)	Caps	Goals	Club
1	GK	**Kenneth Vermeer**	10 January 1986 (aged 19)			(Royal Dutch Football Association) Ajax
2	DF	**Dwight Tiendalli**	21 October 1985 (aged 19)			(Royal Dutch Football Association) Utrecht
3	DF	**Ron Vlaar**	16 February 1985 (aged 20)			(Royal Dutch Football Association) Feyenoord
4	DF	Frank van der Struijk	29 March 1985 (aged 20)			(Royal Dutch Football Association) Willem II
5	DF	Jeroen Drost	21 January 1987 (aged 18)			(Royal Dutch Football Association) Heerenveen
6	DF	**Hedwiges Maduro**	13 February 1985 (aged 20)			(Royal Dutch Football Association) Ajax
7	FW	**Quincy Owusu-Abeyie** (Note: Capped for Ghana)	15 April 1986 (aged 19)			(The Football Association) Arsenal
8	MF	Rick Kruys	9 May 1985 (aged 20)			(Royal Dutch Football Association) Utrecht
9	FW	**Collins John**	17 October 1985 (aged 19)			(The Football Association) Fulham
10	MF	**Ibrahim Afellay**	2 April 1986 (aged 19)			(Royal Dutch Football Association) PSV
11	FW	**Ryan Babel**	19 December 1986 (aged 18)			(Royal Dutch Football Association) Ajax
12	DF	Gianni Zuiverloon	30 December 1986 (aged 18)			(Royal Dutch Football Association) RKC Waalwijk
13	DF	Mark Otten	2 September 1985 (aged 19)			(Royal Dutch Football Association) Excelsior
14	MF	**Haris Medunjanin** (Note: Capped for Bosnia and Herzegovina)	8 March 1985 (aged 20)			(Royal Dutch Football Association) AZ
15	MF	**Urby Emanuelson**	16 June 1986 (aged 18)			(Royal Dutch Football Association) Ajax
16	GK	Theo Brack	10 February 1985 (aged 20)			(Royal Dutch Football Association) Zwolle
17	MF	**Kemy Agustien** (Note: Capped for Curaçao)	20 August 1986 (aged 18)			(Royal Dutch Football Association) Willem II
18	FW	Tim Vincken	12 September 1986 (aged 18)			(Royal Dutch Football Association) Feyenoord
19	FW	**Prince Rajcomar** (Note: Capped for Curaçao)	25 April 1985 (aged 20)			(Royal Dutch Football Association) Den Bosch
20	FW	Arjan Wisse	10 June 1985 (aged 19)			(Royal Dutch Football Association) Telstar
21	GK	Job Bulters	20 March 1986 (aged 19)			(Royal Dutch Football Association) AZ

== Group B ==
=== China ===
Head coach: (Germany) Eckhard Krautzun

No.	Pos.	Player	Date of birth (age)	Caps	Goals	Club
1	GK	Zhang Lei	6 April 1985 (aged 20)			(Chinese Football Association) Dongguan Nancheng
2	DF	Zhao Ming	3 October 1987 (aged 17)			(Chinese Football Association) Jilin Yanbian
3	DF	**Liu Yu**	12 May 1985 (aged 20)			(Chinese Football Association) Sichuan Guancheng
4	DF	Zheng Tao	20 October 1985 (aged 19)			(Chinese Football Association) Shaanxi Guoli
5	DF	**Feng Xiaoting**	22 October 1985 (aged 19)			(Chinese Football Association) Dalian Shide
6	MF	Wang Hongliang	14 January 1985 (aged 20)			(Chinese Football Association) Shanghai Shenhua
7	MF	**Zhao Xuri**	3 December 1985 (aged 19)			(Chinese Football Association) Dalian Shide
8	MF	**Zhou Haibin**	19 July 1985 (aged 19)			(Chinese Football Association) Shandong Luneng
9	FW	**Dong Fangzhuo**	23 January 1985 (aged 20)			(The Football Association) Manchester United
10	MF	**Chen Tao**	11 March 1985 (aged 20)			(Chinese Football Association) Shenyang Ginde
11	FW	**Zhu Ting**	15 July 1985 (aged 19)			(Chinese Football Association) Dalian Shide
12	GK	Yu Ziqian	3 June 1985 (aged 20)			(Chinese Football Association) Dalian Shide
13	MF	Lu Lin	3 February 1985 (aged 20)			(Chinese Football Association) Guangzhou Rizhiquan
14	FW	**Mao Biao**	24 July 1987 (aged 17)			(Chinese Football Association) Tianjin Teda
15	DF	**Yuan Weiwei**	25 November 1985 (aged 19)			(Chinese Football Association) Shandong Luneng
16	GK	Yang Cheng	11 October 1985 (aged 19)			(Chinese Football Association) Shandong Luneng
17	DF	Tan Wangsong	19 December 1985 (aged 19)			(Chinese Football Association) Sichuan Guancheng
18	FW	**Gao Lin**	14 February 1986 (aged 19)			(Chinese Football Association) Shanghai Shenhua
19	FW	Zou You	22 November 1985 (aged 19)			(Chinese Football Association) Dalian Shide
20	MF	**Cui Peng**	31 May 1987 (aged 18)			(Chinese Football Association) Shandong Luneng
21	MF	**Hao Junmin**	24 March 1987 (aged 18)			(Chinese Football Association) Tianjin Teda

=== Panama ===
Head coach: (Panama) Victor Mendieta

No.	Pos.	Player	Date of birth (age)	Caps	Goals	Club
1	GK	**José Calderón**	14 August 1985 (aged 19)			(Panamanian Football Federation) San Francisco
2	DF	Tomás Dunn	14 August 1985 (aged 19)			(Panamanian Football Federation) Chepo
3	DF	**Armando Gun**	17 January 1986 (aged 19)			(Panamanian Football Federation) Chorrillo
4	DF	**Román Torres**	20 March 1986 (aged 19)			(Panamanian Football Federation) Chepo
5	DF	José Venegas	20 February 1985 (aged 20)			(Uruguayan Football Association) Atenas
6	MF	**Celso Polo**	19 March 1987 (aged 18)			(Panamanian Football Federation) Chepo
7	FW	**Reggie Arosemena**	9 September 1986 (aged 18)			(Panamanian Football Federation) Tauro
8	FW	**Cristian Vega**	2 April 1985 (aged 20)			(Colombian Football Federation) Deportes Tolima
9	FW	**Edwin Aguilar**	7 August 1985 (aged 19)			(Panamanian Football Federation) Tauro
10	MF	**Miguel Castillo**	8 November 1986 (aged 18)			(Uruguayan Football Association) Atenas
11	FW	David Arrué	11 April 1985 (aged 20)			(Panamanian Football Federation) Deportivo Italia
12	GK	Erick Hughes	11 September 1986 (aged 18)			(Panamanian Football Federation) Tauro
13	MF	**Raul Loo**	25 June 1986 (aged 18)			(Panamanian Football Federation) Árabe Unido
14	MF	Eduardo Ponce	29 November 1985 (aged 19)			(Panamanian Football Federation) Chepo
15	MF	Hanamell Hill	12 March 1986 (aged 19)			(Panamanian Football Federation) San Francisco
16	MF	**Luis Gallardo**	27 June 1986 (aged 18)			(United States Soccer Federation) Columbus Crew
17	FW	Álvaro Salazar	22 November 1985 (aged 19)			(Panamanian Football Federation) Árabe Unido
18	MF	**Ricardo Buitrago**	10 March 1985 (aged 20)			(Panamanian Football Federation) Plaza Amador
19	FW	**Eduardo Jiménez**	2 April 1986 (aged 19)			(Panamanian Football Federation) San Francisco
20	FW	Mario Duarte	24 August 1985 (aged 19)			(Panamanian Football Federation) Atlético Chiriquí
21	GK	Iván Rodríguez	18 June 1988 (aged 16)			Unattached

=== Turkey ===
Head coach: (Turkey) Şenol Ustaömer

No.	Pos.	Player	Date of birth (age)	Caps	Goals	Club
1	GK	Serkan Kırıntılı	15 February 1985 (aged 20)			(Turkish Football Federation) Ankaragücü
2	DF	Uğur Uçar	5 April 1987 (aged 18)			(Turkish Football Federation) Galatasaray
3	DF	Ergün Teber	1 September 1985 (aged 19)			(Turkish Football Federation) Kayserispor
4	DF	**Yasin Çakmak**	6 January 1985 (aged 20)			(Turkish Football Federation) Çaykur Rizespor
5	DF	Aytaç Ak	22 April 1985 (aged 20)			(Turkish Football Federation) Sakaryaspor
6	MF	Zafer Şakar	25 September 1985 (aged 19)			(Turkish Football Federation) Antalyaspor
7	FW	**Burak Yılmaz**	15 July 1985 (aged 19)			(Turkish Football Federation) Antalyaspor
8	MF	Sezer Öztürk	3 November 1985 (aged 19)			(German Football Association) Bayer Leverkusen
9	MF	Kerim Zengin	13 April 1985 (aged 20)			(Turkish Football Federation) Mersin İdmanyurdu
10	MF	**Selçuk İnan**	10 February 1985 (aged 20)			(Turkish Football Federation) Dardanelspor
11	MF	**Olcan Adın**	30 September 1985 (aged 19)			(Turkish Football Federation) Antalyaspor
12	GK	Şener Özcan	3 March 1985 (aged 20)			(Turkish Football Federation) Gençlerbirliği
13	DF	Sezer Sezgin	3 March 1986 (aged 19)			(Turkish Football Federation) Beşiktaş
14	FW	Emre Aygün	1 June 1985 (aged 20)			(Turkish Football Federation) Yimpaş Yozgatspor
15	DF	Ozan Tahtaişleyen	18 January 1985 (aged 20)			(Turkish Football Federation) Gaziantepspor
16	FW	Gökhan Güleç	25 September 1985 (aged 19)			(Turkish Football Federation) Gaziantepspor
17	FW	Ergin Keleş	1 January 1987 (aged 18)			(Turkish Football Federation) Trabzonspor
18	MF	Gürhan Gürsoy	24 September 1987 (aged 17)			(Turkish Football Federation) Fenerbahçe
19	DF	Hakan Aslantaş	26 August 1985 (aged 19)			(Turkish Football Federation) Gençlerbirliği
20	FW	Ali Öztürk	28 July 1986 (aged 18)			(Turkish Football Federation) Gençlerbirliği
21	GK	Bekir Küçükertaş	25 February 1986 (aged 19)			(Turkish Football Federation) Bakırköyspor

=== Ukraine ===
Head coach: (Ukraine) Oleksiy Mykhaylychenko

No.	Pos.	Player	Date of birth (age)	Caps	Goals	Club
1	GK	Leonid Musin	19 April 1985 (aged 20)			(Ukrainian Association of Football) Dynamo Kyiv
2	DF	Dmytro Hololobov	1 January 1985 (aged 20)			(Ukrainian Association of Football) Obolon Kyiv
3	DF	**Oleh Dopilka**	12 March 1986 (aged 19)			(Ukrainian Association of Football) Dynamo Kyiv
4	DF	Anatoliy Kitsuta	22 December 1985 (aged 19)			(Ukrainian Association of Football) Dynamo Kyiv
5	DF	**Oleksandr Yatsenko**	24 February 1985 (aged 20)			(Ukrainian Association of Football) Dynamo Kyiv
6	MF	Serhiy Rozhok	25 April 1985 (aged 20)			(Ukrainian Association of Football) Tavriya Simferopol
7	DF	Andriy Proshyn	19 February 1985 (aged 20)			(Russian Football Union) Khimki
8	MF	**Oleksandr Aliyev**	3 February 1985 (aged 20)			(Ukrainian Association of Football) Dynamo Kyiv
9	MF	Oleksandr Sytnyk	2 January 1985 (aged 20)			(Ukrainian Association of Football) Dynamo Kyiv
10	FW	**Artem Milevskyi**	12 January 1985 (aged 20)			(Ukrainian Association of Football) Dynamo Kyiv
11	FW	**Oleksandr Hladkyy**	24 August 1987 (aged 17)			(Ukrainian Association of Football) Kharkiv
12	GK	**Bohdan Shust**	4 March 1986 (aged 19)			(Ukrainian Association of Football) Karpaty Lviv
13	FW	Maksym Feshchuk	25 November 1985 (aged 19)			(Ukrainian Association of Football) Karpaty Lviv
14	MF	Volodymyr Arzhanov	6 April 1985 (aged 20)			(Ukrainian Association of Football) Metalurh Zaporizhya
15	DF	**Hryhoriy Yarmash**	4 January 1985 (aged 20)			(Ukrainian Association of Football) Dynamo Kyiv
16	FW	Dmytro Vorobey	10 May 1985 (aged 20)			(Ukrainian Association of Football) Dynamo Kyiv
17	MF	Volodymyr Samborskyi	29 August 1985 (aged 19)			(Ukrainian Association of Football) Kharkiv
18	FW	Serhiy Silyuk	5 June 1985 (aged 20)			(Ukrainian Association of Football) Metalurh Zaporizhya
19	MF	Oleh Herasymyuk	22 September 1986 (aged 18)			(Ukrainian Association of Football) Dynamo Kyiv
20	MF	Andriy Derkach	28 May 1985 (aged 20)			(Ukrainian Association of Football) Borysfen Boryspil
21	GK	Yuriy Martyshchuk	22 April 1986 (aged 19)			(Ukrainian Association of Football) Spartak Ivano-Frankivsk

== Group C ==
=== Chile ===
Head coach: (Chile) José Sulantay

No.	Pos.	Player	Date of birth (age)	Caps	Goals	Club
1	GK	Carlos Espinoza	23 February 1985 (aged 20)			(Football Federation of Chile) Puerto Montt
2	DF	Edson Riquelme	29 August 1985 (aged 19)			(Football Federation of Chile) Concepción
3	MF	Sebastián Páez	13 August 1986 (aged 18)			(Football Federation of Chile) La Serena
4	DF	Sebastián Montesinos	12 March 1986 (aged 19)			(Football Federation of Chile) Colo-Colo
5	DF	Hugo Bascuñán	11 January 1985 (aged 20)			(Venezuelan Football Federation) UA Maracaibo
6	MF	**Marcelo Díaz**	30 December 1986 (aged 18)			(Football Federation of Chile) Universidad de Chile
7	MF	**Fernando Meneses**	27 September 1985 (aged 19)			(Football Federation of Chile) Colo-Colo
8	MF	Iván Vásquez	13 August 1985 (aged 19)			(Football Federation of Chile) Universidad Católica
9	FW	**Nicolás Canales**	27 June 1985 (aged 19)			(Football Federation of Chile) Universidad de Chile
10	MF	**Pedro Morales**	25 May 1985 (aged 20)			(Football Federation of Chile) Huachipato
11	FW	Eduardo Tudela	3 March 1986 (aged 19)			(Football Federation of Chile) Cobreloa
12	GK	Carlos Arias	4 September 1986 (aged 18)			(Football Federation of Chile) Universidad Católica
13	DF	Felipe Muñoz	4 April 1985 (aged 20)			(Football Federation of Chile) Colo-Colo
14	MF	**Matías Fernández**	15 May 1986 (aged 19)			(Football Federation of Chile) Colo-Colo
15	MF	**Carlos Carmona**	21 February 1987 (aged 18)			(Football Federation of Chile) Coquimbo Unido
16	DF	Francisco Sánchez	6 February 1985 (aged 20)			(Football Federation of Chile) Everton
17	FW	**Carlos Villanueva**	5 February 1986 (aged 19)			(Football Federation of Chile) Audax Italiano
18	DF	**Gonzalo Jara**	29 August 1985 (aged 19)			(Football Federation of Chile) Huachipato
19	MF	**José Pedro Fuenzalida**	22 February 1985 (aged 20)			(Football Federation of Chile) Universidad Católica
20	FW	Ricardo Parada	2 January 1985 (aged 20)			(Football Federation of Chile) Universidad de Concepción
21	GK	José Rosales	20 September 1986 (aged 18)			(Football Federation of Chile) O'Higgins

=== Honduras ===
Head coach: (Honduras) Rubén Guifarro

No.	Pos.	Player	Date of birth (age)	Caps	Goals	Club
1	GK	Ángel Guerra	1 April 1986 (aged 19)			(National Autonomous Federation of Football of Honduras) Olimpia
2	DF	Roy Bodden	3 February 1986 (aged 19)			(National Autonomous Federation of Football of Honduras) Estrella
3	DF	Nery Turcios	30 May 1985 (aged 20)			(Royal Dutch Football Association) Groningen
4	DF	Aarón Bardales	3 December 1985 (aged 19)			(National Autonomous Federation of Football of Honduras) Olimpia
5	DF	**Erick Norales**	11 February 1985 (aged 20)			(National Autonomous Federation of Football of Honduras) Vida
6	DF	René Moncada	1 June 1985 (aged 20)			(National Autonomous Federation of Football of Honduras) Olimpia
7	DF	Luis Ramos	11 April 1985 (aged 20)			(National Autonomous Federation of Football of Honduras) Marathón
8	MF	**Jorge Claros**	8 January 1986 (aged 19)			(National Autonomous Federation of Football of Honduras) Vida
9	FW	Walter Rice	22 December 1987 (aged 17)			(National Autonomous Federation of Football of Honduras) Real España
10	FW	**Ramón Núñez**	14 November 1985 (aged 19)			(United States Soccer Federation) FC Dallas
11	FW	José Güity	19 May 1985 (aged 20)			(National Autonomous Federation of Football of Honduras) Marathón
12	GK	Orlando Rivera	10 March 1985 (aged 20)			(National Autonomous Federation of Football of Honduras) Marathón
13	DF	Fernando Cruz	8 August 1988 (aged 16)			(National Autonomous Federation of Football of Honduras) Platense
14	FW	José Cruz	3 January 1985 (aged 20)			(National Autonomous Federation of Football of Honduras) Real España
15	DF	Maynor Martínez	8 April 1985 (aged 20)			(National Autonomous Federation of Football of Honduras) Real España
16	MF	Nataury Lara	19 August 1985 (aged 19)			(National Autonomous Federation of Football of Honduras) La Mesa
17	MF	**Emilio Izaguirre**	10 May 1986 (aged 19)			(National Autonomous Federation of Football of Honduras) Motagua
18	FW	Ángel Nolasco	2 November 1986 (aged 18)			(National Autonomous Federation of Football of Honduras) Platense
19	MF	**Marvin Sánchez**	2 November 1986 (aged 18)			(National Autonomous Federation of Football of Honduras) Platense
20	MF	Julián Rápalo	9 August 1986 (aged 18)			(National Autonomous Federation of Football of Honduras) Villanueva
21	GK	Fernando Pineda	15 February 1985 (aged 20)			(National Autonomous Federation of Football of Honduras) Villanueva

=== Morocco ===
Head coach: (Morocco) Fathi Jamal

No.	Pos.	Player	Date of birth (age)	Caps	Goals	Club
1	GK	Mohammed El Bourkadi	22 April 1985 (aged 20)			(Royal Moroccan Football Federation) Maghreb Fez
2	DF	Hicham El Amrani	25 November 1985 (aged 19)			(Royal Moroccan Football Federation) Rachad Bernoussi
3	DF	**Chakib Benzoukane**	7 August 1986 (aged 18)			(Royal Moroccan Football Federation) Kawkab de Marrakech
4	DF	**Ahmed Kantari**	28 June 1985 (aged 19)			(French Football Federation) Paris Saint-Germain
5	DF	**Youssef Rabeh**	13 April 1985 (aged 20)			(Royal Moroccan Football Federation) FAR Rabat
6	DF	Abderrahmane Mssassi	24 April 1985 (aged 20)			(Royal Moroccan Football Federation) Maghreb Fez
7	MF	**Adil Hermach**	27 June 1986 (aged 18)			(French Football Federation) Lens
8	MF	Sofian Benzouien	11 August 1986 (aged 18)			(Royal Belgian Football Association) Beringen-Heusden-Zolder
9	FW	**Mouhcine Iajour**	14 June 1985 (aged 19)			(Royal Moroccan Football Federation) Raja Casablanca
10	FW	**Nabil El Zhar**	27 August 1986 (aged 18)			(French Football Federation) Saint-Étienne
11	FW	Tarik Bendamou	14 January 1985 (aged 20)			(Royal Moroccan Football Federation) Raja Casablanca
12	GK	Yahya Iraqui	29 February 1988 (aged 17)			(Royal Moroccan Football Federation) Wydad Casablanca
13	DF	**Salaheddine Sbaï**	21 August 1985 (aged 19)			(Royal Belgian Football Association) Ronse
14	MF	Rachid Tiberkanine	28 March 1985 (aged 20)			(Royal Dutch Football Association) Ajax
15	MF	Rida Lah Douliazale	3 September 1985 (aged 19)			(Royal Moroccan Football Federation) Wydad Casablanca
16	MF	**Karim El Ahmadi**	27 January 1985 (aged 20)			(Royal Dutch Football Association) Twente
17	MF	Yassine Zouchou	26 July 1985 (aged 19)			(Royal Moroccan Football Federation) Wydad Casablanca
18	DF	**Said Fettah**	15 January 1986 (aged 19)			(Royal Moroccan Football Federation) Raja Casablanca
19	FW	**Abdessalam Benjelloun**	28 January 1985 (aged 20)			(Royal Moroccan Football Federation) Maghreb Fez
20	FW	**Adil Chihi**	21 February 1988 (aged 17)			(German Football Association) 1. FC Köln
21	GK	Mourad Atta	1 January 1985 (aged 20)			(Royal Moroccan Football Federation) Wydad Casablanca

=== Spain ===
Head coach: (Spain) Iñaki Sáez

No.	Pos.	Player	Date of birth (age)	Caps	Goals	Club
1	GK	Biel Ribas	2 December 1985 (aged 19)			(Royal Spanish Football Federation) Espanyol
2	DF	Francisco Molinero	26 July 1985 (aged 19)			(Royal Spanish Football Federation) Atlético Madrid
3	DF	Javier Garrido	15 March 1985 (aged 20)			(Royal Spanish Football Federation) Real Sociedad
4	DF	Alexis	4 August 1985 (aged 19)			(Royal Spanish Football Federation) Málaga
5	DF	Miquel Robusté (c)	20 May 1985 (aged 20)			(Royal Spanish Football Federation) Espanyol
6	DF	**Raúl Albiol**	4 September 1985 (aged 19)			(Royal Spanish Football Federation) Getafe
7	DF	**Juanfran**	9 January 1985 (aged 20)			(Royal Spanish Football Federation) Real Madrid
8	MF	Alberto Zapater	13 June 1985 (aged 19)			(Royal Spanish Football Federation) Real Zaragoza
9	FW	**Fernando Llorente**	26 February 1985 (aged 20)			(Royal Spanish Football Federation) Athletic Bilbao
10	FW	Jonathan Soriano	24 September 1985 (aged 19)			(Royal Spanish Football Federation) Espanyol
11	MF	Jaime Gavilán	12 May 1985 (aged 20)			(Royal Spanish Football Federation) Tenerife
12	DF	José Enrique	23 January 1986 (aged 19)			(Royal Spanish Football Federation) Levante
13	GK	Manu	9 May 1986 (aged 19)			(Royal Spanish Football Federation) Sporting Gijón
14	DF	Agus	3 May 1985 (aged 20)			(Royal Spanish Football Federation) Albacete
15	DF	Javi Chica	17 May 1985 (aged 20)			(Royal Spanish Football Federation) Espanyol
16	MF	**David Silva**	8 January 1986 (aged 19)			(Royal Spanish Football Federation) Eibar
17	MF	**Cesc Fàbregas**	4 May 1987 (aged 18)			(The Football Association) Arsenal
18	FW	Víctor Casadesús	28 February 1985 (aged 20)			(Royal Spanish Football Federation) Mallorca
19	FW	Braulio Nóbrega	18 September 1985 (aged 19)			(Royal Spanish Football Federation) Atlético Madrid
20	MF	Markel Bergara	5 May 1986 (aged 19)			(Royal Spanish Football Federation) Real Sociedad
21	GK	Roberto Jiménez	10 February 1986 (aged 19)			(Royal Spanish Football Federation) Atlético Madrid

== Group D ==
=== Argentina ===
Head coach: (Argentina) Francisco Ferarro

No.	Pos.	Player	Date of birth (age)	Caps	Goals	Club
1	GK	**Oscar Ustari**	3 July 1986 (aged 18)			(Argentine Football Association) Independiente
2	DF	Gustavo Cabral	14 October 1985 (aged 19)			(Argentine Football Association) Racing Club
3	DF	Lautaro Formica	27 January 1986 (aged 19)			(Argentine Football Association) Newell's Old Boys
4	DF	Julio Barroso	16 January 1985 (aged 20)			(Argentine Football Association) Boca Juniors
5	MF	Juan Manuel Torres	20 June 1985 (aged 19)			(Argentine Football Association) Racing Club
6	DF	**Gabriel Paletta** (Note: Capped for Italy)	15 February 1986 (aged 19)			(Argentine Football Association) Banfield
7	MF	**Lucas Biglia**	30 January 1986 (aged 19)			(Argentine Football Association) Independiente
8	DF	**Pablo Zabaleta**	16 January 1985 (aged 20)			(Argentine Football Association) San Lorenzo
9	FW	Pablo Vitti	9 July 1985 (aged 19)			(Argentine Football Association) Rosario Central
10	MF	Patricio Pérez	27 June 1985 (aged 19)			(Argentine Football Association) Vélez Sársfield
11	MF	Emiliano Armenteros	18 January 1986 (aged 19)			(Argentine Football Association) Banfield
12	GK	Nereo Champagne	20 January 1985 (aged 20)			(Argentine Football Association) San Lorenzo
13	DF	**Ezequiel Garay**	10 October 1986 (aged 18)			(Argentine Football Association) Newell's Old Boys
14	DF	David Abraham	15 July 1986 (aged 18)			(Argentine Football Association) Independiente
15	MF	Rodrigo Archubi	6 June 1985 (aged 20)			(Argentine Football Association) Lanús
16	FW	**Neri Cardozo**	8 August 1986 (aged 18)			(Argentine Football Association) Boca Juniors
17	MF	**Fernando Gago**	10 April 1986 (aged 19)			(Argentine Football Association) Boca Juniors
18	FW	**Lionel Messi**	24 June 1987 (aged 17)			(Royal Spanish Football Federation) Barcelona
19	FW	**Sergio Agüero**	2 June 1988 (aged 17)			(Argentine Football Association) Independiente
20	FW	Gustavo Oberman	25 March 1985 (aged 20)			(Argentine Football Association) Argentinos Juniors
21	GK	Nicolás Navarro	25 March 1985 (aged 20)			(Argentine Football Association) Argentinos Juniors

=== Egypt ===
Head coach: (Egypt) Mohamed Radwan

No.	Pos.	Player	Date of birth (age)	Caps	Goals	Club
1	GK	Hamada Shaaban	1 October 1985 (aged 19)			(Egyptian Football Association) Mansoura
2	DF	Nano	24 March 1985 (aged 20)			(Egyptian Football Association) El-Ahly
3	MF	**Abdelaziz Tawfik**	24 May 1986 (aged 19)			(Egyptian Football Association) Mansoura
4	MF	**Hossam Ashour**	9 March 1986 (aged 19)			(Egyptian Football Association) El-Ahly
5	DF	Walid Kandel	24 March 1985 (aged 20)			(Egyptian Football Association) Zamalek
6	DF	Abdelilah Galal	20 January 1986 (aged 19)			(Egyptian Football Association) El-Ahly
7	DF	**Ahmed Samir Farag**	20 May 1986 (aged 19)			(French Football Federation) Sochaux
8	FW	**Ahmed Abd El-Zaher**	15 January 1985 (aged 20)			(Egyptian Football Association) ENPPI
9	FW	Hossam Osama	30 August 1985 (aged 19)			(Egyptian Football Association) Zamalek
10	FW	**Shikabala**	5 March 1986 (aged 19)			(Hellenic Football Federation) PAOK
11	FW	**Abdallah El Said**	13 July 1985 (aged 19)			(Egyptian Football Association) Ismaily
12	MF	**Abdallah Shahat**	10 May 1985 (aged 20)			(Egyptian Football Association) Ismaily
13	DF	Ahmed Abd El-Hakam	18 March 1985 (aged 20)			(Egyptian Football Association) Mansoura
14	DF	Ahmed Magdy	24 May 1986 (aged 19)			(Egyptian Football Association) El-Ahly
15	DF	Islam Siam	13 February 1985 (aged 20)			(Egyptian Football Association) El Mokawloon SC
16	GK	Amir Tawfik	2 October 1985 (aged 19)			(Egyptian Football Association) El-Ahly
17	MF	Amr El Halwani	15 March 1985 (aged 20)			(Egyptian Football Association) El-Ahly
18	MF	Ahmed Ghanem Soltan	8 April 1986 (aged 19)			(Egyptian Football Association) Zamalek
19	MF	Ahmed Khalifa	23 March 1985 (aged 20)			(Egyptian Football Association) Ismaily
20	DF	Ahmed Gamil	12 April 1986 (aged 19)			(Egyptian Football Association) Zamalek
21	GK	Ahmed Adel Abdel Moneam	10 April 1987 (aged 18)			(Egyptian Football Association) El-Ahly

=== Germany ===
Head coach: (Germany) Michael Skibbe

No.	Pos.	Player	Date of birth (age)	Caps	Goals	Club
1	GK	**René Adler**	15 January 1985 (aged 20)			(German Football Association) Bayer Leverkusen
2	DF	Christoph Janker	14 February 1985 (aged 20)			(German Football Association) 1860 Munich
3	DF	**Marvin Compper**	14 June 1985 (aged 19)			(German Football Association) Borussia Mönchengladbach
4	DF	**Marvin Matip** (Note: Capped for Cameroon)	25 September 1985 (aged 19)			(German Football Association) 1. FC Köln
5	DF	Marcel Schuon	28 April 1985 (aged 20)			(German Football Association) VfB Stuttgart
6	MF	Andreas Ottl	1 March 1985 (aged 20)			(German Football Association) Bayern Munich
7	FW	Michael Delura	1 July 1985 (aged 19)			(German Football Association) Schalke 04
8	MF	**Christian Gentner**	14 August 1985 (aged 19)			(German Football Association) VfB Stuttgart
9	FW	Nicky Adler	23 May 1985 (aged 20)			(German Football Association) 1860 München
10	FW	Sahr Senesie	20 June 1985 (aged 19)			(Swiss Football Association) Grasshoppers
11	DF	**Marcell Jansen**	4 November 1985 (aged 19)			(German Football Association) Borussia Mönchengladbach
12	GK	Philipp Tschauner	3 November 1985 (aged 19)			(German Football Association) 1. FC Nürnberg
13	MF	**Alexander Huber** (Note: Capped for Tajikistan)	25 February 1985 (aged 20)			(German Football Association) Eintracht Frankfurt
14	DF	Christopher Reinhard	19 May 1985 (aged 20)			(German Football Association) Eintracht Frankfurt
15	FW	Sebastian Freis	23 April 1985 (aged 20)			(German Football Association) Karlsruher SC
16	MF	Oliver Hampel	2 March 1985 (aged 20)			(German Football Association) Hamburger SV
17	MF	Daniyel Cimen	19 January 1985 (aged 20)			(German Football Association) Eintracht Frankfurt
18	DF	Paul Thomik	25 January 1985 (aged 20)			(German Football Association) Bayern Munich
19	FW	Thomas Bröker	22 January 1985 (aged 20)			(German Football Association) 1. FC Köln
20	DF	Francis Banecki	17 July 1985 (aged 19)			(German Football Association) Werder Bremen
21	GK	Erik Domaschke	11 November 1985 (aged 19)			(German Football Association) Sachsen Leipzig

=== United States ===
Head coach: (United States) Sigi Schmid

No.	Pos.	Player	Date of birth (age)	Caps	Goals	Club
1	GK	Quentin Westberg	25 April 1986 (aged 19)			(French Football Federation) Troyes
2	DF	**Marvell Wynne**	8 May 1986 (aged 19)			(United States Soccer Federation) University of California, Los Angeles
3	DF	**Jonathan Spector**	1 March 1986 (aged 19)			(The Football Association) Manchester United
4	DF	Nathan Sturgis	6 July 1987 (aged 17)			(United States Soccer Federation) Clemson University
5	DF	Patrick Ianni	5 June 1985 (aged 20)			(United States Soccer Federation) University of California, Los Angeles
6	DF	Greg Dalby	3 November 1985 (aged 19)			(United States Soccer Federation) University of Notre Dame
7	MF	**Sacha Kljestan**	9 September 1985 (aged 19)			(United States Soccer Federation) Seton Hall University
8	MF	**Benny Feilhaber**	9 January 1985 (aged 20)			(United States Soccer Federation) University of California, Los Angeles
9	FW	**Chad Barrett**	20 April 1985 (aged 20)			(United States Soccer Federation) Chicago Fire
10	MF	**Eddie Gaven**	25 October 1986 (aged 18)			(United States Soccer Federation) MetroStars
11	FW	**Freddy Adu**	2 June 1989 (aged 16)			(United States Soccer Federation) D.C. United
12	MF	Will John	13 June 1985 (aged 19)			(United States Soccer Federation) Chicago Fire
13	FW	Jacob Peterson	27 January 1986 (aged 19)			(United States Soccer Federation) Indiana University
14	MF	**Lee Nguyen**	7 October 1986 (aged 18)			(United States Soccer Federation) Dallas Texans
15	DF	Hunter Freeman	8 January 1985 (aged 20)			(United States Soccer Federation) Colorado Rapids
16	MF	Michael Harrington	24 January 1986 (aged 19)			(United States Soccer Federation) University of North Carolina
17	FW	Sammy Ochoa	4 September 1986 (aged 18)			(Mexican Football Federation) Tecos
18	GK	Andrew Kartunen	7 February 1985 (aged 20)			(United States Soccer Federation) Stanford University
19	MF	**Danny Szetela**	17 June 1987 (aged 17)			(United States Soccer Federation) Columbus Crew
20	MF	**Brad Evans**	20 April 1985 (aged 20)			(United States Soccer Federation) University of California, Irvine
21	GK	Justin Hughes	23 April 1985 (aged 20)			(United States Soccer Federation) University of North Carolina

== Group E ==
=== Canada ===
Head coach: (Canada) Dale Mitchell

No.	Pos.	Player	Date of birth (age)	Caps	Goals	Club
1	GK	**Josh Wagenaar**	26 February 1985 (aged 20)			(United States Soccer Federation) Hartwick College
2	DF	Graham Ramalho	12 January 1986 (aged 19)			(Royal Dutch Football Association) Groningen
3	MF	**Nikolas Ledgerwood**	16 January 1985 (aged 20)			(German Football Association) 1860 München
4	DF	**André Hainault**	17 June 1986 (aged 18)			(Canadian Soccer Association) Montreal Impact
5	DF	Brad Peetom	2 March 1986 (aged 19)			(United States Soccer Federation) Syracuse University
6	MF	Carlo Schiavoni	19 August 1985 (aged 19)			(United States Soccer Federation) University of Alabama
7	MF	**Jaime Peters**	4 May 1987 (aged 18)			(The Football Association) Ipswich Town
8	MF	**Tyler Rosenlund**	13 September 1986 (aged 18)			(United States Soccer Federation) UC Santa Barbara
9	MF	Ryan Gyaki	6 December 1985 (aged 19)			(The Football Association) Sheffield United
10	MF	**Will Johnson**	21 January 1987 (aged 18)			(United States Soccer Federation) Chicago Fire
11	DF	**Marcel de Jong**	15 October 1986 (aged 18)			(Royal Dutch Football Association) Helmond Sport
12	FW	Riley O'Neill	9 September 1985 (aged 19)			(United States Soccer Federation) University of Kentucky
13	MF	**Beaulieu Bourgault**	27 September 1988 (aged 16)			(Canadian Soccer Association) Quebec National Training Center
14	DF	**David Edgar**	19 May 1987 (aged 18)			(The Football Association) Newcastle United
15	DF	Vince Stewart	21 January 1986 (aged 19)			(Canadian Soccer Association) Simon Fraser University
16	FW	Franco Lalli	11 March 1985 (aged 20)			(Italian Football Federation) Lucera
17	FW	Andrea Lombardo	23 May 1987 (aged 18)			(Italian Football Federation) Atalanta
18	MF	Tomasz Charowski	15 October 1985 (aged 19)			(United States Soccer Federation) Duke University
19	GK	**Asmir Begović** (Note: Capped for Bosnia and Herzegovina)	10 June 1987 (aged 17)			(The Football Association) Portsmouth
20	GK	Roberto Giacomi	1 August 1986 (aged 18)			(Scottish Football Association) Rangers
21	DF	Simon Kassaye	19 May 1985 (aged 20)			Unattached

=== Colombia ===
Head coach: (Colombia) Eduardo Lara

No.	Pos.	Player	Date of birth (age)	Caps	Goals	Club
1	GK	**Libis Arenas**	12 May 1987 (aged 18)			(Colombian Football Federation) Envigado
2	DF	**Carlos Valdés**	22 May 1985 (aged 20)			(Colombian Football Federation) Real Cartagena
3	DF	**Cristián Zapata**	30 September 1986 (aged 18)			(Colombian Football Federation) Deportivo Cali
4	DF	Jimmy Estacio	8 January 1986 (aged 19)			(Colombian Football Federation) Deportivo Cali
5	DF	**Juan Camilo Zúñiga**	14 December 1985 (aged 19)			(Colombian Football Federation) Atlético Nacional
6	MF	Harrison Morales	20 June 1986 (aged 18)			(Colombian Football Federation) Deportes Quindío
7	FW	**Hugo Rodallega**	25 July 1985 (aged 19)			(Colombian Football Federation) Deportes Quindío
8	FW	**Juan Toja**	24 May 1985 (aged 20)			(Argentine Football Association) River Plate
9	FW	**Radamel Falcao**	10 February 1986 (aged 19)			(Argentine Football Association) River Plate
10	MF	Sebastián Hernández	2 October 1986 (aged 18)			(Colombian Football Federation) Deportes Quindío
11	MF	Harrison Otálvaro	28 June 1986 (aged 18)			(Colombian Football Federation) América de Cali
12	GK	Carlos Abella	25 January 1986 (aged 19)			(Colombian Football Federation) Atlético Nacional
13	MF	**Fredy Guarín**	30 June 1986 (aged 18)			(Colombian Football Federation) Envigado
14	MF	**Abel Aguilar**	6 January 1985 (aged 20)			(Colombian Football Federation) Deportivo Cali
15	FW	**Dayro Moreno**	16 September 1985 (aged 19)			(Colombian Football Federation) Once Caldas
16	MF	**Edwin Valencia**	29 March 1985 (aged 20)			(Colombian Football Federation) América de Cali
17	MF	**Christian Marrugo**	18 July 1985 (aged 19)			(Colombian Football Federation) Atlético Nacional
18	FW	**Wason Rentería**	4 July 1985 (aged 19)			(Colombian Football Federation) Boyacá Chicó
19	DF	**Mauricio Casierra**	8 December 1985 (aged 19)			(Colombian Football Federation) Once Caldas
20	MF	Daniel Machacón	5 January 1985 (aged 20)			(Colombian Football Federation) Junior de Barranquilla
21	GK	**David Ospina**	31 August 1988 (aged 16)			(Colombian Football Federation) Atlético Nacional

=== Italy ===
Head coach: (Italy) Paolo Berrettini

No.	Pos.	Player	Date of birth (age)	Caps	Goals	Club
1	GK	**Emiliano Viviano**	1 December 1985 (aged 19)			(Italian Football Federation) Cesena
2	DF	Lino Marzorati	12 October 1986 (aged 18)			(Italian Football Federation) Milan
3	DF	Andrea D'Agostino	4 July 1985 (aged 19)			(Italian Football Federation) Foggia
4	MF	**Antonio Nocerino**	9 April 1985 (aged 20)			(Italian Football Federation) Catanzaro
5	DF	Andrea Coda	25 April 1985 (aged 20)			(Italian Football Federation) Empoli
6	DF	Michele Canini	5 June 1985 (aged 20)			(Italian Football Federation) Sambenedettese
7	MF	Marino Defendi	19 August 1985 (aged 19)			(Italian Football Federation) Atalanta
8	MF	Lorenzo Carotti	31 January 1985 (aged 20)			(Italian Football Federation) Como
9	FW	**Graziano Pellè**	15 July 1985 (aged 19)			(Italian Football Federation) Catania
10	MF	Michele Troiano	7 January 1985 (aged 20)			(Italian Football Federation) Modena
11	MF	**Daniele Galloppa**	15 May 1985 (aged 20)			(Italian Football Federation) Triestina
12	GK	Fabio Virgili	26 April 1986 (aged 19)			(Italian Football Federation) Parma
13	DF	Francesco Battaglia	26 April 1985 (aged 20)			(Italian Football Federation) Torino
14	DF	Palmiro Di Dio	6 July 1985 (aged 19)			(Italian Football Federation) Ternana
15	DF	Antonio Aquilanti	8 November 1985 (aged 19)			(Italian Football Federation) Fiorentina
16	MF	Simone Bentivoglio	29 May 1985 (aged 20)			(Italian Football Federation) Juventus
17	MF	Raffaele De Martino	8 April 1986 (aged 19)			(Swiss Football Association) Bellinzona
18	MF	Cristian Agnelli	23 September 1985 (aged 19)			(Italian Football Federation) Catanzaro
19	FW	Francesco Nieto	17 June 1985 (aged 19)			(Italian Football Federation) Piacenza
20	FW	Giuseppe Cozzolino	12 August 1985 (aged 19)			(Italian Football Federation) Lecce
21	GK	Daniele Padelli	25 October 1985 (aged 19)			(Italian Football Federation) Sampdoria

=== Syria ===
Head coach: (Serbia and Montenegro) Milosav Radenović

No.	Pos.	Player	Date of birth (age)	Caps	Goals	Club
1	GK	**Adnan Al-Hafez**	23 April 1986 (aged 19)			(Syrian Football Association) Al-Karamah
2	MF	Mohammad Al-Damen	25 January 1986 (aged 19)			(Syrian Football Association) Al-Ittihad Aleppo
3	MF	Safir Alatasi	11 April 1985 (aged 20)			(Syrian Football Association) Al-Karamah
4	DF	Abdulhadi Khalaf	1 January 1986 (aged 19)			(Syrian Football Association) Al-Karamah
5	DF	**Hamzeh Al Aitoni**	16 January 1986 (aged 19)			(Syrian Football Association) Al-Majd
6	DF	Hassan Al-Mostafa	1 January 1986 (aged 19)			(Syrian Football Association) Hurriya
7	MF	**Mutaz Kailouni**	10 March 1985 (aged 20)			(Syrian Football Association) Tishreen
8	MF	**Abdelrazaq Al-Hussain**	15 September 1986 (aged 18)			(Syrian Football Association) Hurriya
9	MF	Mahmoud Ossi	25 March 1987 (aged 18)			(Syrian Football Association) Hurriya
10	FW	**Mohammad Al-Hamwi**	9 June 1984 (aged 21)			(Syrian Football Association) Al-Karamah
11	FW	Jalal Al-Abdi	1 January 1986 (aged 19)			(Syrian Football Association) Al-Taliya
12	DF	Zakariya Al-Kaddour	1 January 1986 (aged 19)			(Syrian Football Association) Al-Ittihad Aleppo
13	MF	**Aatef Jenyat**	8 May 1986 (aged 19)			(Syrian Football Association) Al-Karamah
14	FW	**Majed al-Haj**	6 April 1985 (aged 20)			(Syrian Football Association) Al-Jaish
15	MF	Samer Nahlous	5 April 1985 (aged 20)			(Syrian Football Association) Tishreen
16	GK	Ali Al-Holami	5 January 1986 (aged 19)			(Syrian Football Association) Al-Futowa
17	DF	**Abdulkader Dakka**	10 January 1985 (aged 20)			(Syrian Football Association) Tishreen
18	MF	**Burhan Sahyouni**	7 April 1986 (aged 19)			(Syrian Football Association) Omayya
19	FW	Ahmad Dily Hassan	20 July 1985 (aged 19)			(Syrian Football Association) Al-Barada
20	DF	**Salah Shahrour**	2 January 1988 (aged 17)			(Syrian Football Association) Al-Ittihad Aleppo
21	GK	**Moustafa Shakosh**	1 January 1986 (aged 19)			(Syrian Football Association) Tishreen

== Group F ==
=== Brazil ===
Head coach: (Brazil) Renê Weber

No.	Pos.	Player	Date of birth (age)	Caps	Goals	Club
1	GK	Renan	24 January 1985 (aged 20)			(Brazilian Football Confederation) Internacional
2	DF	**Rafinha**	7 September 1985 (aged 19)			(Brazilian Football Confederation) Coritiba
3	DF	Leonardo Moura	9 March 1986 (aged 19)			(Brazilian Football Confederation) Santos
4	DF	Gladstone	29 January 1985 (aged 20)			(Brazilian Football Confederation) Cruzeiro
5	MF	Roberto Sousa	18 January 1985 (aged 20)			(Brazilian Football Confederation) Guarani
6	DF	**Fábio Santos**	16 September 1985 (aged 19)			(Brazilian Football Confederation) São Paulo
7	MF	**Diego Souza**	17 June 1985 (aged 19)			(Brazilian Football Confederation) Fluminense
8	MF	Renato Ribeiro	28 April 1985 (aged 20)			(Brazilian Football Confederation) Atlético Mineiro
9	FW	Bobô	9 January 1985 (aged 20)			(Brazilian Football Confederation) Corinthians
10	MF	Evandro	28 March 1986 (aged 19)			(Brazilian Football Confederation) Atlético Paranaense
11	FW	**Rafael Sóbis**	17 June 1985 (aged 19)			(Brazilian Football Confederation) Internacional
12	GK	Bruno	1 May 1986 (aged 19)			(Brazilian Football Confederation) São Paulo
13	DF	João Leonardo	25 June 1985 (aged 19)			(Brazilian Football Confederation) Guarani
14	DF	Edcarlos	10 May 1985 (aged 20)			(Brazilian Football Confederation) São Paulo
15	DF	**Filipe Luís**	9 August 1985 (aged 19)			(Royal Dutch Football Association) Ajax
16	MF	**Arouca**	11 August 1986 (aged 18)			(Brazilian Football Confederation) Fluminense
17	MF	Fellype Gabriel	6 December 1985 (aged 19)			(Brazilian Football Confederation) Flamengo
18	MF	Ernane	2 May 1985 (aged 20)			(Brazilian Football Confederation) Bahia
19	FW	Thiago Quirino	4 January 1985 (aged 20)			(Brazilian Football Confederation) Atlético Mineiro
20	FW	**Diego Tardelli**	10 May 1985 (aged 20)			(Brazilian Football Confederation) São Paulo
21	GK	**Diego Alves**	24 June 1985 (aged 19)			(Brazilian Football Confederation) Atlético Mineiro

=== Nigeria ===
Head coach: (Nigeria) Samson Siasia

No.	Pos.	Player	Date of birth (age)	Caps	Goals	Club
1	GK	Ambruse Vanzekin	14 July 1986 (aged 18)			(Nigeria Football Federation) Bendel Insurance
2	DF	Kennedy Chinwo	29 December 1985 (aged 19)			(Nigeria Football Federation) Dolphins
3	DF	**Taye Taiwo**	16 April 1985 (aged 20)			(French Football Federation) Marseille
4	DF	**Onyekachi Apam**	30 December 1986 (aged 18)			(Nigeria Football Federation) Enugu Rangers
5	DF	**Monday James**	19 October 1986 (aged 18)			(Nigeria Football Federation) Bendel Insurance
6	DF	Yinka Adedeji	24 March 1985 (aged 20)			(Swedish Football Association) GIF Sundsvall
7	FW	**Chinedu Obasi**	1 June 1986 (aged 19)			(Norwegian Football Federation) Lyn
8	MF	Daddy Bazuaye	11 December 1988 (aged 16)			(Nigeria Football Federation) Bendel Insurance
9	MF	**Mikel John Obi**	22 April 1987 (aged 18)			(Norwegian Football Federation) Lyn
10	FW	**Isaac Promise**	2 December 1987 (aged 17)			(Nigeria Football Federation) Grays International
11	FW	**Solomon Okoronkwo**	2 March 1987 (aged 18)			(German Football Association) Hertha BSC
12	GK	**Daniel Akpeyi**	3 August 1986 (aged 18)			(Nigeria Football Federation) Gabros International
13	MF	**Olubayo Adefemi**	13 August 1985 (aged 19)			(Israel Football Association) Hapoel Jerusalem
14	MF	David Abwo	10 May 1986 (aged 19)			(Nigeria Football Federation) Enyimba
15	FW	Soga Sambo	5 October 1985 (aged 19)			(Nigeria Football Federation) Shooting Stars
16	FW	Gift Atulewa	1 April 1986 (aged 19)			(Nigeria Football Federation) Bayelsa United
17	DF	**Dele Adeleye**	25 December 1988 (aged 16)			(Nigeria Football Federation) Shooting Stars
18	MF	Kola Anubi	24 March 1987 (aged 18)			(Nigeria Football Federation) Bendel Insurance
19	MF	**Sani Kaita**	2 May 1986 (aged 19)			(Nigeria Football Federation) Kano Pillars
20	FW	**John Owoeri**	13 January 1987 (aged 18)			(Nigeria Football Federation) Bendel Insurance
21	GK	Kola Ige	28 December 1985 (aged 19)			(Nigeria Football Federation) Shooting Stars

=== South Korea ===
Head coach: (South Korea) Park Sung-hwa

No.	Pos.	Player	Date of birth (age)	Caps	Goals	Club
1	GK	Cha Gi-suk	26 December 1986 (aged 18)			(Korea Football Association) Chunnam Dragons
2	DF	Park Hee-chul	7 January 1986 (aged 19)			(Korea Football Association) Hongik University
3	DF	Ahn Tae-eun	17 September 1985 (aged 19)			(Korea Football Association) Chosun University
4	DF	Lee Yo-han	18 December 1985 (aged 19)			(Korea Football Association) Incheon United
5	DF	**Jung In-whan**	15 December 1986 (aged 18)			(Korea Football Association) Yonsei University
6	DF	**Kim Jin-kyu**	16 February 1985 (aged 20)			(Japan Football Association) Júbilo Iwata
7	MF	Baek Seung-min	12 March 1986 (aged 19)			(Korea Football Association) Yonsei University
8	MF	**Baek Ji-hoon**	28 February 1985 (aged 20)			(Korea Football Association) FC Seoul
9	MF	**Oh Jang-eun**	24 July 1985 (aged 19)			(Korea Football Association) Daegu FC
10	FW	**Park Chu-young**	10 July 1985 (aged 19)			(Korea Football Association) FC Seoul
11	MF	**Lee Keun-ho**	11 April 1985 (aged 20)			(Korea Football Association) Incheon United
12	GK	**Jung Sung-ryong**	4 January 1985 (aged 20)			(Korea Football Association) Pohang Steelers
13	FW	**Shin Hyung-min**	18 July 1986 (aged 18)			(Korea Football Association) Hongik University
14	MF	Park Jong-jin	24 June 1987 (aged 17)			(Korea Football Association) Soongsil University
15	MF	Hwang Kyu-hwan	18 June 1986 (aged 18)			(Korea Football Association) Suwon Samsung Bluewings
16	FW	**Sim Woo-yeon**	3 April 1985 (aged 20)			(Korea Football Association) Konkuk University
17	FW	**Lee Seung-hyun**	25 July 1985 (aged 19)			(Korea Football Association) Hanyang University
18	FW	Kim Seung-yong	14 March 1985 (aged 20)			(Korea Football Association) FC Seoul
19	FW	**Shin Young-rok**	27 March 1987 (aged 18)			(Korea Football Association) Suwon Samsung Bluewings
20	DF	**Lee Woo-jin**	24 April 1986 (aged 19)			(Japan Football Association) Tokyo Verdy
21	GK	Kim Dae-ho	15 April 1986 (aged 19)			(Korea Football Association) Soongsil University

=== Switzerland ===
Head coach: (Switzerland) Pierre-André Schürmann

No.	Pos.	Player	Date of birth (age)	Caps	Goals	Club
1	GK	Swen König	3 September 1985 (aged 19)			(Swiss Football Association) Aarau
2	DF	Ferhat Çökmüş	14 February 1985 (aged 20)			(Swiss Football Association) Young Boys
3	DF	Arnaud Bühler	17 January 1985 (aged 20)			(Swiss Football Association) Aarau
4	DF	**Johan Djourou**	18 January 1987 (aged 18)			(The Football Association) Arsenal
5	DF	**Philippe Senderos**	14 February 1985 (aged 20)			(The Football Association) Arsenal
6	DF	Vero Salatić	14 November 1985 (aged 19)			(Swiss Football Association) Grasshoppers
7	MF	**Tranquillo Barnetta**	22 May 1985 (aged 20)			(German Football Association) Hannover 96
8	FW	Goran Antić	4 July 1985 (aged 19)			(Swiss Football Association) Wil
9	FW	**Johan Vonlanthen**	1 February 1986 (aged 19)			(Italian Football Federation) Brescia
10	MF	Fabrizio Zambrella	7 July 1985 (aged 19)			(Italian Football Federation) Brescia
11	DF	**Reto Ziegler**	16 January 1986 (aged 19)			(The Football Association) Tottenham Hotspur
12	GK	Daniel Lopar	13 September 1985 (aged 19)			(Swiss Football Association) Aarau
13	DF	Henry Siqueira-Barras	15 January 1985 (aged 20)			(Swiss Football Association) Neuchâtel Xamax
14	MF	**Sandro Burki**	16 September 1985 (aged 19)			(Swiss Football Association) Wil
15	FW	Marco Schneuwly	27 March 1985 (aged 20)			(Swiss Football Association) Young Boys
16	MF	**Pirmin Schwegler**	9 March 1987 (aged 18)			(Swiss Football Association) Luzern
17	DF	Florian Stahel	10 March 1985 (aged 20)			(Swiss Football Association) Zürich
18	MF	Christian Schlauri	30 March 1985 (aged 20)			(Swiss Football Association) Basel
19	FW	**Guilherme Afonso** (Note: Capped for Angola)	15 November 1985 (aged 19)			(Royal Dutch Football Association) Twente
20	MF	**Blerim Džemaili**	12 April 1986 (aged 19)			(Swiss Football Association) Zürich
21	GK	David González	9 November 1986 (aged 18)			(Swiss Football Association) Servette
