= Ige =

IGE is Internet Gaming Entertainment, an MMORPG services company.

Ige, IGE or Igé may also refer to:

== Sciences ==
- Immunoglobulin E (IgE), an antibody
- Induced gamma emission, the process of fluorescent emission of gamma rays
- Idiopathic generalized epilepsy, a group of epileptic disorders
- Intergenerational elasticity of income, used in the Great Gatsby Curve in the social sciences

== Organizations ==
- IGE Group of Companies, a Myanmar conglomerate
- IGE Resources, former name of Bluelake Mineral AB, a Swedish mining company
- Swiss Federal Institute of Intellectual Property (Eidgenössisches Institut für Geistiges Eigentum)

== Places ==
- Igé, Orne, a commune in Basse-Normandie, France
- Igé, Saône-et-Loire a commune in Bourgogne, France

== People ==
- Bola Ige (1930–2001), Nigerian lawyer
- Dan Ige (born 1991), American mixed martial artist
- David Ige (born 1957), American politician
- Kola Ige (born 1985), Nigerian footballer
- Olawale Adeniji Ige (born 1938), Nigerian engineer and politician
- Ruth Ige (born 1992), Nigerian painter based in New Zealand

== Other uses ==
- Infinite garble extension, a block cipher mode of operation
