= Ernane =

Ernane is a given name. It may refer to:

- Ernane (footballer, born May 1985), Brazilian football attacking midfielder Ernane Ferreira Cavalheira Campos
- Ernane Galvêas (1922–2022), Brazilian economist and politician, former president of the Central Bank of Brazil and former Minister of the Economy

== See also ==
- Ernani
