= Rönnbäcken mine =

Mine planned in Storuman, Sweden

Rönnbäcken mining project
- Location: Västerbotten County, Sweden
- Products: Nickel

Rönnbäcken is a planned mining project in the north of Sweden in Storuman Municipality, Västerbotten County. It is regarded as one of the largest nickel reserves in Sweden having estimated reserves of 340 million tonnes of ore grading 0.18% nickel. The 340 million tonnes of ore contains 0.61 million tonnes of nickel metal.

The project has been developed by the Bluelake Mineral Group (formerly Nickel Mountain Group). By 2015-12-31 the exploitation permits were sold to the Swedish company Archelon AB, since Nickel Mountain switched to debt collection business.
