= Echiabhi Okodugha =

Nigerian footballer

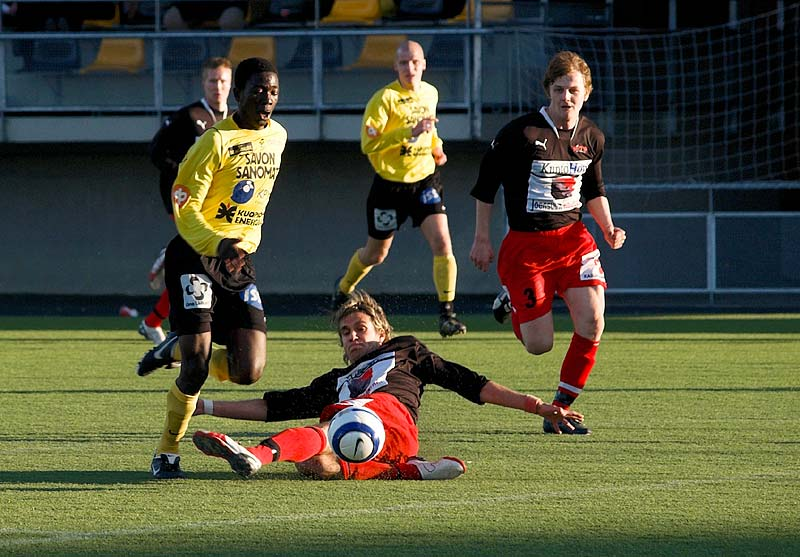
- Okodugha playing for KuPS (first from left)

Personal information
- Date of birth: December 10, 1988 (age 37)
- Place of birth: Lagos, Nigeria
- Height: 1.80 m (5 ft 11 in)
- Positions: Defender; midfielder

Youth career
- Pepsi Football Academy
- –2005: F.C. Ebedei

Senior career*
Years	Team	Apps	(Gls)
2006	F.C. Ebedei		
2007–2008	KuPS	42	(4)
2009	RoPS	26	(6)
2010–2013	IFK Mariehamn	33	(7)
2014	KPV	1	(0)
2015	Pallo-Iirot	9	(0)
2016–2017	SalPa	40	(4)
2018	BK-46	19	(1)
- * Club domestic league appearances and goals

Echiabhi Okodugha (born 10 December 1988) is a Nigerian footballer.

== Career ==
Okodugha was playing earlier active for Nigeria Pepsi Football Academy and later with F.C. Ebedei in Nigeria. In 2006, he signed a professional contract with Finnish Veikkausliiga team KuPS, here played in two years forty-two games and scores four goals. He left KuPS for league rival RoPS on 20 February 2009.
