= Pepsi Football Academy =

Nigerian association football academy

The Pepsi Football Academy is a Nigerian association football academy and was established in November 1992.

== History ==
The Pepsi Football Academy was established in November 1992 by Kashimawo Laloko. Originally based in Lagos, the initiative secured the total backing of Pepsi in 1994 and has been titled the Pepsi Football Academy since then. Over the years, it has developed and grown into one of the most prestigious football academies in Nigeria.

Today, the academy comprises over 3,000 registered students aged between 6–18 years and operates throughout the year from 14 separate training centres and 54 coaches across Nigeria. Footballers who started their careers at the academy include Mikel John Obi, Sunday Mba, Dominic Chatto, Echiabhi Okodugha, Joseph Akpala, Elderson Echiéjilé, Soga Sambo, and Yinka Adedeji.

In 2006, the academy set up a scholarship scheme. As of now, 13 players were awarded scholarships to England.

== Notable players ==
- Mikel John Obi
- Joseph Akpala
- Sunday Mba
- Elderson Echiéjilé
