= Dmytro Hololobov =

Ukrainian footballer (born 1985)

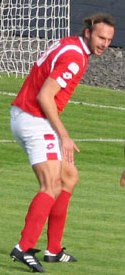

Personal information
- Full name: Dmytro Viktorovych Hololobov
- Date of birth: 1 January 1985 (age 41)
- Place of birth: Kirovohrad, Ukrainian SSR
- Height: 2.01 m (6 ft 7 in)
- Position: Defender

Youth career
- 1998–2000: Zirka Kirovohrad
- 2000–2002: Shakhtar Donetsk

Senior career*
Years	Team	Apps	(Gls)
2002	Metalurh-2 Donetsk	1	(0)
2003–2005	Obolon Kyiv	8	(1)
2003–2005	→ Obolon-2 Kyiv	34	(1)
2004	→ Podillya Khmelnytskyi (loan)	0	(0)
2005–2006	Kharkiv	5	(0)
2006	→ Stal Dniprodzerzhynsk (loan)	2	(0)
2007	Dnipro Cherkasy	6	(0)
2007	Kajaanin Haka	10	(0)
2007–2011	PFC Sevastopol	72	(4)
2011–2012	Zirka Kirovohrad	12	(1)
2012	Zhemchuzhyna Yalta	7	(1)
2013	Karlivka	4	(0)

International career
2005	Ukraine U20	1	(0)
- * Club domestic league appearances and goals

Dmytro Hololobov (Ukrainian: Дмитро Вікторович Гололобов, born 1 January 1985), is a Ukrainian former football defender.

== See also ==
- 2005 FIFA World Youth Championship squads § Ukraine
