= Yuriy Martyshchuk =

Ukrainian footballer

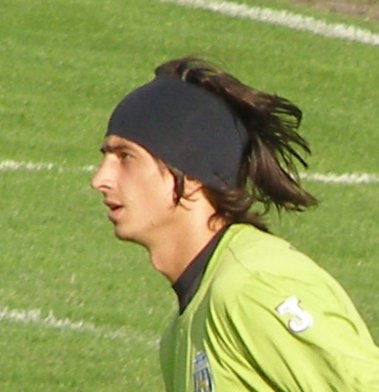

Personal information
- Full name: Yuriy Vasylyovych Martyshchuk
- Date of birth: 22 April 1986 (age 40)
- Place of birth: Kolomyia, Ukrainian SSR
- Height: 1.88 m (6 ft 2 in)
- Position: Goalkeeper

Youth career
- 1999–2003: VPU-21 Ivano-Frankivsk

Senior career*
Years	Team	Apps	(Gls)
2003	FC Prykarpattya Kalush	1	(0)
2003–2005	FC Spartak Ivano-Frankivsk	44	(0)
2005–2010	FC Karpaty Lviv	32	(0)
2008	FC Karpaty-2 Lviv	15	(0)
2010–2012	FC Zorya Luhansk	7	(0)
2012–2015	FC Chornomorets Odesa	9	(0)

International career^{‡}
2004	Ukraine-18	4	(0)
2004–2005	Ukraine-19	8	(0)
2005	Ukraine-20	1	(0)
2006–2007	Ukraine-21	5	(0)
- * Club domestic league appearances and goals as of 2 July 2015 ‡ National team caps and goals as of 2 July 2015

Yuriy Martyshchuk (Ukrainian: Юрій Васильович Мартищук; born 22 April 1986) is a professional Ukrainian football goalkeeper who played for Chornomorets Odesa in the Ukrainian Premier League. He joined Zorya from Karpaty prior to the 2010–11 season after 5 seasons having only minimal playing time.

== See also ==
- 2005 FIFA World Youth Championship squads#Ukraine
