= Dagoberto Currimilla =

Chilean footballer (born 1987)

Personal information
- Full name: Dagoberto Alexis Currimilla Gómez
- Date of birth: December 26, 1987 (age 38)
- Place of birth: Paillaco, Chile
- Height: 1.72 m (5 ft 8 in)
- Positions: Right-back; right midfielder

Youth career
- Masisa
- Escuela N° 1
- Universidad Austral
- Huachipato

Senior career*
Years	Team	Apps	(Gls)
2004–2011	Huachipato	157	(8)
2011	→ Santiago Morning (loan)	15	(1)
2012–2017	Unión Española	153	(6)
2012	Unión Española B	5	(0)
2017–2021	Deportes Valdivia	88	(13)
2022–2023	Unión Wanderers	–	(–)
Total		418	(28)

International career
2007	Chile U20	13	(0)
2006	Chile	1	(0)
- * Club domestic league appearances and goals

Dagoberto Alexis Currimilla Gómez (born December 26, 1987) is a Chilean former professional footballer who played as a right-back. He's a former Chilean international.

== Club career ==
As a child, Currimilla represented the teams of Masisa and the Escuela N° 1 from Valdivia, Chile. As a youth player, he joined the football academy of Austral University of Chile (UACH) and took part in the Mundialito Valdivia, a traditional international youth championship organized by the same university.

A Huachipato youth graduate, Currimilla made his professional debut in 2004, aged 17, and became a starter for Huachipato, playing 157 matches for the club. In 2011, he was loaned to Santiago Morning in the Primera B. After achieving promotion from the second tier, Currimilla was transferred to Unión Española, returning to the Chilean Primera División, where in his debut season, he'd finish runner up in 2012 of the 2012 Clausura scoring his first goal for the club in the second leg of the final, which they lost in penalties against Huachipato. The following season, Currimilla would win the first silverware of his career, as Unión Española would be crowned champions of the 2013 Primera División, following it up with a victory in the 2013 Supercopa de Chile.

Currimilla would remain a starter for Unión Española until 2017, when he was deemed surplus to requirements and his contract was not renewed. He returned to the Chilean second tier by signing with Deportes Valdivia in 2017, where he'd suffer the first relegation of his career after Valdivia was relegated to the Segunda División, the third tier of Chilean football in 2020. Citing mental exhaustion, injuries, and unpaid wages, Currimilla retired from professional football after the 2021 season.

Following his retirement, he played for Unión Wanderers General Lagos in the regional championship of Los Ríos Region.

== International career ==
Currimilla would make his international debut for Chile in 2006, starting in a 1-0 friendly win against New Zealand in La Calera, this being his only senior international appearance in his career. Currimilla was part of the Chilean U-20 team that played in the 2007 South American Youth Championship, finishing fourth, and qualifying for the 2007 FIFA U-20 World Cup in Canada in which Chile finished third.

== Post-retirement ==
Currimilla settled nearby his hometown, Paillaco, to work in animal husbandry and subsistence fishing.

== Honours ==
Unión Española

- Primera División (1): 2013
- Supercopa de Chile (1): 2013

Chile U20

- FIFA U-20 World Cup: third place: 2007
