= Camilo Pino (footballer) =

Chilean footballer

Personal information
- Full name: Camilo Enrique Pino Pedreros
- Date of birth: 4 March 1968 (age 58)
- Place of birth: Santiago, Chile
- Height: 1.68 m (5 ft 6 in)
- Position: Midfielder

Youth career
- Aviación
- 1982–1983: Cobreloa

Senior career*
Years	Team	Apps	(Gls)
1983–1998	Cobreloa	198	(18)
1989	→ Deportes Arica (loan)		
1993	→ Coquimbo Unido (loan)	21	(2)
1999–2002	Deportes Antofagasta		

International career
1985	Chile U17		
1987	Chile U20		
- * Club domestic league appearances and goals

Camilo Enrique Pino Pedreros (born 4 March 1968) is a Chilean former football player who played as a midfielder.

== Career ==
Born in Santiago, Chile, Pino was with Aviación until its dissolving before switching to Cobreloa. He was promoted to the first team in 1983, moved to Calama the same year and made his professional debut in 1984, aged 16. A historical player for Cobreloa, he played for them until 1998, winning three Chilean Primera División league titles in 1985, 1988 and 1992 and taking part in the 1989 Copa Libertadores.

As a player of Cobreloa, Pino had stints on loan with Deportes Arica in 1989 and Coquimbo Unido in 1993.

Following Cobreloa, Pino played for Deportes Antofagasta between 1999 and 2002 in the Primera B de Chile.

== International career ==
Pino was with Chile U17 under Vicente Cantatore in 1985.

Two years later, Pino represented Chile U20 in both the 1987 South American Championship and the 1987 FIFA World Championship, where Chile reached the fourth place and he became the tournament's third top goalscorer with 5 goals in six matches.
