= Volodymyr Samborskyi =

Ukrainian footballer

Personal information
- Full name: Volodymyr Samborskyi
- Date of birth: 29 August 1985 (age 41)
- Place of birth: Ukrainian SSR, Soviet Union
- Height: 1.71 m (5 ft 7 1/2 in)
- Position: Defender

Senior career*
Years	Team	Apps	(Gls)
2001–2002	FC Borysfen-2 Boryspil	23	(0)
2002–2004	FC Dynamo-2 Kyiv	23	(0)
2002–2004	FC Dynamo-3 Kyiv	14	(3)
2004–2005	FC Metalist Kharkiv	23	(0)
2004	→ FC Metalist-2 Kharkiv	2	(0)
2005	FC Arsenal Kharkiv	12	(0)
2005–2009	FC Kharkiv	28	(3)
2011	FC Kryvbas Kryvyi Rih	0	(0)
Medal record
Men's football
Representing Ukraine
UEFA European Under-19 Championship
Bronze medal – third place	2004 Switzerland
- * Club domestic league appearances and goals

Volodymyr Samborskyi (born 29 August 1985) is a Ukrainian former professional football defender.

== See also ==
- 2005 FIFA World Youth Championship squads#Ukraine
