= Joseph Akpala =

Nigerian footballer (born 1986)

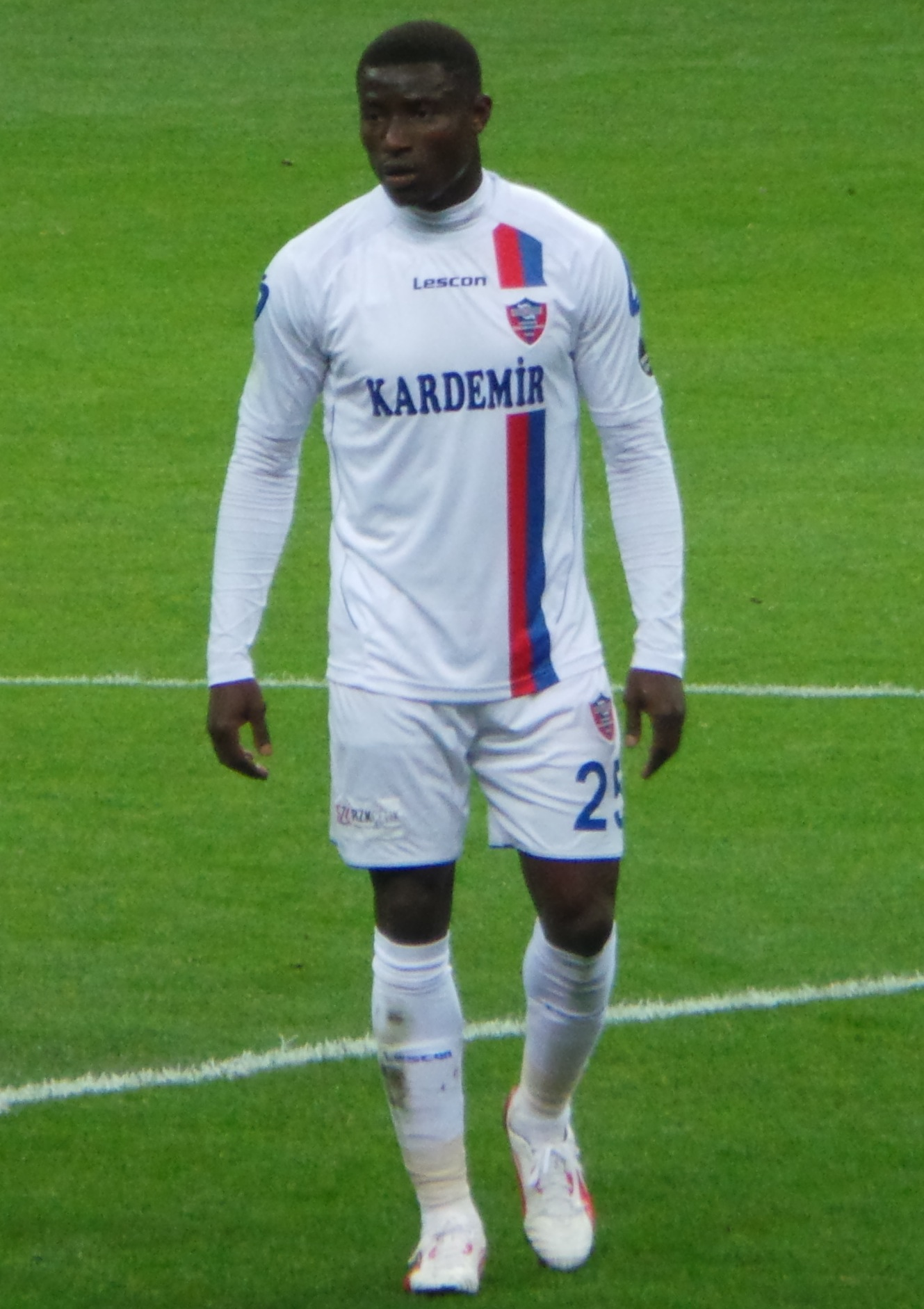
- Akpala with Karabükspor in 2013

Personal information
- Full name: Joseph Eneojo Akpala
- Date of birth: 24 August 1986 (age 40)
- Place of birth: Jos, Nigeria
- Height: 1.85 m (6 ft 1 in)
- Position: Forward

Youth career
- 1997–2002: Pepsi Football Academy
- 2003–2004: Bendel United

Senior career*
Years	Team	Apps	(Gls)
2005	Bendel Insurance	19	(13)
2006–2008	Charleroi	61	(24)
2008–2012	Club Brugge	105	(39)
2012–2014	Werder Bremen	21	(1)
2013–2014	→ Karabükspor (loan)	11	(4)
2014–2015	Karabükspor	25	(4)
2015–2018	KV Oostende	62	(12)
2018–2019	Al-Faisaly	14	(2)
2019–2020	KV Oostende	6	(1)
2021	Dinamo București	1	(0)
Total		325	(90)

International career
2005–2006	Nigeria U20	23	(10)
2008–2013	Nigeria	9	(1)

Managerial career
- 2023: Kortrijk (caretaker, two spells)
- * Club domestic league appearances and goals

Joseph Eneojo Akpala (born 24 August 1986) is a Nigerian football manager and former professional footballer who played as a forward. Since 2022, he is the current assistant coach of Club Brugge. Akpala has been assistant coach at Kortrijk, taking over as caretaker coach for one match in September 2023, in between the dismissal of Edward Still and the appointment of Glen De Boeck, and taking the reins again following De Boeck's sacking in November 2023.

== Club career ==
Akpala is a product of the Pepsi Football Academy in Lagos. His first professional contract came in April 2003 with Bendel United Football Club, a Division One club in Benin City. He later joined Bendel Insurance FC, Benin City in the Premier Division of the Nigerian Professional League, in February 2005. He was to finish as joint top scorer with 13 goals in 19 games.

Subsequently, Akpala was signed by the Royal Charleroi S.C. of Belgian Jupiler Pro League in January 2006. He wore the number 27 jersey. He had a very successful campaign in 2007–08 as he topped the scorers chart with 18 goals. On 18 July 2008, Akpala joined Club Brugge signing a contract until 2013.

On 22 August 2012, Bundesliga club Werder Bremen signed Akpala after facing competition from West Ham United and Celtic. On 19 August 2013, Akpala began a week-long trial with English Championship side Reading.

On 3 September 2013, Akpala signed for Turkish Karabükspor on a season loan. In 2014 the deal was made permanent and he left Bremen for good.

However, only after another year, in July 2015, he returned to Belgium, signing for K.V. Oostende on a three-year contract.

In April 2021, he joined Romanian club Dinamo București, signing a contract until the end of the 2020–21 season.

== International career ==
Akpala made his debut for Nigeria against South Africa on 6 September 2008. In June 2009, he scored his first goal for Nigeria in a 1–0 away win against France in Saint-Étienne.

He was selected for Nigeria's squad at the 2013 FIFA Confederations Cup.

== Career statistics ==
=== Club ===
Appearances and goals by club, season and competition
Club	Season	League			Cup		Continental		Other		Total	
Club	Season	Division	Apps	Goals	Apps	Goals	Apps	Goals	Apps	Goals	Apps	Goals
Bendel Insurance	2005	Nigeria Professional Football League	19	13							19	13
Charleroi	2005–06	Belgian First Division	8	2							8	2
Charleroi	2006–07	Belgian First Division	22	4							22	4
Charleroi	2007–08	Belgian First Division	31	18							31	18
Charleroi	Total		61	24							61	24
Club Brugge	2008–09	Belgian First Division	32	15	0	0	6 (Note: Appearances in UEFA Europa League)	1	–		38	16
Club Brugge	2009–10	Belgian Pro League	25	7	3	1	11	3	6 (Note: Appearances in Belgian Pro League playoffs)	1	45	12
Club Brugge	2010–11	Belgian Pro League	18	4	0	0	3	0	10	3	31	7
Club Brugge	2011–12	Belgian Pro League	27	13	1	0	11	7	9	2	48	22
Club Brugge	2012–13	Belgian Pro League	3	0	0	0	2 (Note: Appearances in UEFA Champions League)	0	–		5	0
Club Brugge	Total		105	39	4	1	33	11	25	6	167	57
Werder Bremen	2012–13	Bundesliga	21	1	0	0	0	0	–		21	1
Kardemir Karabükspor (loan)	2013–14	Süper Lig	11	4	3	2	0	0	–		14	6
Kardemir Karabükspor	2014–15	Süper Lig	25	4	6	1	2	0	–		33	5
KV Oostende	2015–16	Belgian Pro League	26	5	1	0	–		9	2	36	7
KV Oostende	2016–17	Belgian First Division A	9	1	3	0	–		9	3	21	4
KV Oostende	2017–18	Belgian First Division A	27	6	2	0	2	0	9	3	38	9
KV Oostende	Total		62	12	6	0	2	0	27	8	97	20
Al Faisaly	2018–19	Saudi Pro League	14	2							14	2
KV Oostende	2019–20	Belgian First Division A	6	1	1	0	–		0	0	7	1
Dinamo București	2020–21	Liga I	1	0	0	0	–		–		1	0
Career total			325	100	20	4	37	11	52	14	434	129

=== International ===
Appearances and goals by national team and year
National team	Year	Apps	Goals
Nigeria	2008	3	0
Nigeria	2009	2	1
Nigeria	2010	1	0
Nigeria	2011	0	0
Nigeria	2012	0	0
Nigeria	2013	3	0
Total		9	1

Score and result list Nigeria's goal tally first, score column indicates score after Akpala goal.

International goal scored by Joseph Akpala
No.	Date	Venue	Opponent	Score	Result	Competition
1	2 June 2009	Stade Geoffroy-Guichard, Saint-Étienne, France	France	1–0	1–0	Friendly

== Honours ==
KV Oostende

- Belgian Cup: runner-up 2016–17

Individual

- Belgian First Division top scorer: 2007–08 (16 goals)
