= Daniel Machacón =

Colombian footballer (born 1985)

Daniel Machacón (born 5 January 1985) is a Colombian footballer. He can play as central midfielder and is a starter.

He played with the Colombia U-20 at the 2005 South American Youth Championship, which Colombia hosted and won. He then competed at the 2005 FIFA World Youth Championship in the Netherlands, helping Colombia to the Round of 16 before losing to eventual champion Argentina.
