= Edson Riquelme =

Chilean footballer (born 1985)

Personal information
- Full name: Edson Riquelme
- Date of birth: 29 August 1985 (age 41)
- Place of birth: Concepción, Chile
- Height: 1.76 m (5 ft 9 in)

Senior career*
Years	Team	Apps	(Gls)
2005–2008	Concepción		
2009–2010	Naval		
2011	Lota Schwager		

International career^{‡}
2005	Chile U20	–	(–)
- * Club domestic league appearances and goals as of 28 July 2021 ‡ National team caps and goals as of 28 July 2021

Edson Riquelme (born 29 August 1985) is a Chilean former footballer. His last club was Lota Schwager.

He played for Chile Under-20 in the 2005 South American Youth Championship in Colombia and the 2005 FIFA World Youth Championship in the Netherlands.
