= Francisco Sánchez (footballer, born 1985) =

Chilean footballer

Personal information
- Full name: Francisco Javier Sánchez Silva
- Date of birth: 6 February 1985 (age 41)
- Place of birth: Viña del Mar, Chile
- Height: 1.73 m (5 ft 8 in)
- Position: Midfielder

Youth career
- 1998–2004: Everton

Senior career*
Years	Team	Apps	(Gls)
2004–2010	Everton	145	(8)
2010	San Luis	9	(0)
2011–2014	Audax Italiano	56	(4)
2013	Audax Italiano B	3	(0)
2014–2017	Cobresal	46	(3)
2015–2016	→ Deportes Antofagasta (loan)	17	(1)
2017–2019	Unión La Calera	19	(1)
Total		295	(17)

International career
2005	Chile U20	1	(0)
- * Club domestic league appearances and goals

Francisco Javier Sánchez Silva (born 6 February 1985 in Vina del Mar) is a Chilean former footballer who played as a midfielder, sometimes as a defender.

== Career ==
Sánchez started his football career in the youth ranks of Everton in 1998, being promoted to the professional adult team in June 2004. A year later, he was part of the Chilean U20 team that took part of the 2005 FIFA World Youth Championship. Paco became in a key player of Everton during the seasons that faced the club of Viña del Mar. In 2007, he lived his worst season in the team, but in the next season, under the coach Nelson Acosta, the club reached his fourth title in the Chilean Primera División, after 32 years without a league title.

In the second semester of 2008, Sánchez was an undisputed titular, but in the next campaigns, Sánchez was relegated to the bench, and in winter break of 2010, was signed by San Luis Quillota. After of live his first relegation in his career, Paco was released of the club.

In January 2011, Sánchez was signed by Audax Italiano. His first goal for the club came against Universidad Católica, scoring his side's goal in a 3–1 away loss.

== Personal life ==
He is nicknamed Paco, common term of endearment of Francisco in Chile and all countries that speak in Spanish language.

Sánchez graduated as a business administrator in 2010 and has worked for a shipping company in his city of birth. In addition, he started a project in footvolley.

== Honours ==
Everton

- Primera B (1): 2003
- Primera División de Chile (1): 2008 Apertura

Cobresal

- Primera División de Chile (1): 2015 Clausura

Unión La Calera

- Primera B (1): 2017
