= Carlos Arias (Chilean footballer) =

Chilean footballer (born 1986)

Personal information
- Full name: Carlos Andrés Arias Pérez
- Date of birth: 4 September 1986 (age 40)
- Place of birth: Santiago, Chile
- Height: 1.80 m (5 ft 11 in)
- Position: Goalkeeper

Youth career
- Universidad Católica

Senior career*
Years	Team	Apps	(Gls)
2006–2010	Universidad Católica	0	(0)
2006	→ Curicó Unido (loan)	0	(0)
2009–2010	→ Provincial Osorno (loan)	50	(0)
2012	Deportes La Serena	0	(0)
2013–2015	Deportes Melipilla	33	(0)
2014	→ San Antonio Unido (loan)	22	(0)
Total		105	(0)

International career
2005–2007	Chile U20	2	(0)
- * Club domestic league appearances and goals

Carlos Andrés Arias Pérez (born 4 September 1986) is a Chilean former football goalkeeper.

== Club career ==
A product of Universidad Católica youth system, he was sent on loan to Curicó Unido in 2006 and professionally debuted in the Primera B Championship.

== International career ==
He was the starting goalkeeper on the Chilean U-20 team during the 2007 South American Youth Championship in Colombia, in which Chile placed fourth and subsequently qualified for the 2005 FIFA World Youth Championship.

Arias was the starting goalkeeper for Chile at the 2005 FIFA World Youth Championship in the Netherlands.

== Honours ==
=== Player ===
Universidad Católica

- Primera División de Chile (1): Runner-up 2007 Apertura
