= Abdallah Shahat =

Egyptian footballer (born 1985)

Personal information
- Full name: Abdallah Shahat
- Date of birth: 10 May 1985 (age 41)
- Place of birth: Egypt
- Height: 1.77 m (5 ft 9 1/2 in)
- Position: Midfielder

Senior career*
Years	Team	Apps	(Gls)
2005–2012	Ismaily	111	(11)
2012–2014	ENPPI	10	(2)
2014	Smouha SC	13	(0)
2014–2015	Al Masry	9	(0)
2016–2017	Al Nasr Lel Taa'den	18	(4)
2017–2018	Alassiouty Sport		

International career^{‡}
2011	Egypt	2	(0)
- * Club domestic league appearances and goals as of 1 April 2018 ‡ National team caps and goals as of 6 January 2012

Abdallah Shahat (born May 10, 1985) is an Egyptian footballer who plays as a midfielder for ENPPI Club in the Egyptian Premier League.

== Club career ==
In 2005, he signed with Egyptian Premier League side Ismaily.

== International career ==
On 17 January 2011 he made his debut for the Egypt national football team in 2011 Nile Basin Tournament match against Uganda national football team.
