= David González (footballer, born 1986) =

Swiss footballer

Personal information
- Date of birth: 9 November 1986 (age 40)
- Place of birth: Geneva, Switzerland
- Height: 1.81 m (5 ft 11 in)
- Position: Goalkeeper

Youth career
- 1995–1998: FC Saint-Jean Genève
- 1999–2005: Servette
- 2005–2006: Sion

Senior career*
Years	Team	Apps	(Gls)
2006–2007	FC Sion B	28	(0)
2007–2009	Sion	10	(0)
2008–2009	→ Servette (loan)	21	(0)
2009–2014	Servette	94	(0)
2013–2014	→ Étoile Carouge (loan)	20	(0)
2014–2016	Étoile Carouge	47	(0)
2016–2018	Servette	33	(0)

International career
2006–2008	Switzerland U-21	8	(0)
- * Club domestic league appearances and goals

David González (born 9 November 1986) is a former Swiss football goalkeeper.

== Football career ==
On 5 July 2005 he was signed by FC Sion and moved on 30 September 2008 to Servette. Due to his leadership and impressive displays, González has become the vice-captain of Servette.

In 2013, he joined Etoile Carouge, returning to Servette in January 2016.

=== International career ===
He was with the Swiss U-19 squad which finished bottom in the qualifying group in 2005 UEFA European Under-19 Football Championship.

He also with the Swiss U-20 sides which finished bottom of the final group at 2005 FIFA World Youth Championship, as 3rd goalkeeper.
