= Soga Sambo =

Nigerian footballer

Personal information
- Full name: Soga Sambo
- Date of birth: 5 October 1985 (age 41)
- Place of birth: Kaduna, Nigeria
- Height: 1.81 m (5 ft 11 in)
- Position: Midfielder

Youth career
- –2001: Pepsi Football Academy

Senior career*
Years	Team	Apps	(Gls)
2002–2003	ASEC Mimosas		
2003–2005	Shooting Stars F.C.		
2005–2007	Mamelodi Sundowns F.C.	7	(0)
2007–2008	Kwara United F.C.		
2008–2009	FC Inter Turku	3	(0)
2009–2010	Kwara United F.C.		(4)
2010–2011	Niger Tornadoes		(1)
2011–2014	Sunshine Stars		(0)
2014–2016	Sharks	1	(0)

International career
2001	Nigeria U-17	3	(0)
2005	Nigeria U-20	3	(0)
- * Club domestic league appearances and goals as of 11 April 2016

Soga Sambo (born 5 October 1985 in Kaduna) is a Nigerian football striker who presumably last played for the Sharks of Nigeria until their dissolution in 2016.

== Career ==
Sambo began his career by Pepsi Football Academy and moved in January 2002 to Côte d'Ivoire Premier Division club ASEC Mimosas, played for 1 year by the team before turning to Nigeria he signs a contract by Shooting Stars F.C. He played for 2 years by the team from Ibadan and moved in January 2006 for one year to Mamelodi Sundowns F.C. in the Premier Soccer League, the club from Pretoria elongated his contract not and he released the club and moved back to Nigeria, he signs a contract by Kwara United F.C. On 26 September 2008 he moved to Finland based Club FC Inter Turku.

== International ==
He was member of the Nigeria U-20 at 2005 FIFA World Youth Championship in Netherlands and won the Silver medal (Vice-Worldcup Winner). He won with Nigeria U-17 at 2001 FIFA U-17 World Championship in Trinidad and Tobago the Silver medal (Vice-Worldcup Winner).

== Titles ==
- 2001 FIFA U-17 World Championship - Silver medal (Vice-Worldcup Winner)
- 2005 FIFA World Youth Championship - Silver medal (Vice-Worldcup Winner)
- 2008 Veikkausliiga Winner with FC Inter Turku
