= Hugo Bascuñán =

Chilean footballer (born 1985)

Personal information
- Full name: Hugo Gabriel Bascuñán Vera
- Date of birth: 10 January 1985 (age 41)
- Place of birth: Casablanca, Chile
- Height: 1.85 m (6 ft 1 in)
- Position: Defender

Youth career
- Molino de Casablanca
- Colo-Colo
- Everton

Senior career*
Years	Team	Apps	(Gls)
2002	Everton		
2003	Miramar Misiones		
2003	Everton		
2004–2005	Italmaracaibo		
2006	Everton		
2007–2009	Universidad de Concepción		
2008	→ Santiago Wanderers (loan)		
2010–2016	Unión La Calera	115	(4)
2011	→ Unión Temuco (loan)	25	(3)
2016–2017	San Marcos	24	(0)
2017–2018	Ñublense	24	(2)
2019–2020	Santiago Morning	38	(3)
2021	San Antonio Unido	5	(0)

International career
2005	Chile U20		
- * Club domestic league appearances and goals

Hugo Gabriel Bascuñán Vera (born 10 January 1985) is a Chilean former professional footballer who played as a defender. He retired at the end of the 2021 season. His last club was Chilean Segunda División side San Antonio Unido.
