= Chile national under-20 football team =

National association football team

Chile
- Nickname: La Rojita (The Little Red One)
- Association: Federación de Fútbol de Chile
- Confederation: CONMEBOL (South America)
- Head coach: Nicolás Córdova
- FIFA code: CHI
First colours	Second colours

First international
- Chile 4–1 Bolivia (Santiago, Chile; 14 March 1951)

Biggest win
- Chile 7–0 Honduras (Doetinchem, Netherlands; 11 June 2005)

Biggest defeat
- Chile 0–7 Spain (Doetinchem, Netherlands; 15 June 2005)

FIFA U-20 World Cup
- Appearances: 7 (first in 1987)
- Best result: Third place (2007)

CONMEBOL Sub 20
- Appearances: 30 (first in 1954)
- Best result: Runners-up (1975)

Chile national under-20 football team
Medal record

FIFA U-20 World Cup
Bronze medal – third place	2007 Canada	Team

Chile national under-20 football team
Medal record

CONMEBOL Sub 20
Silver medal – second place	1975 Peru	NA
Bronze medal – third place	1995 Bolivia	NA

Chile national under-20 football team
Medal record

Premier Under-20 SuperCupNI
Gold medal – first place	2000 Elite	NA
Bronze medal – third place	2007 Elite	NA
Silver medal – second place	2008 Elite	NA

Chile national under-20 football team
Medal record

Maurice Revello Tournament
Silver medal – second place	2008 Toulon Tournament	Team
Gold medal – first place	2009 Toulon Tournament	Team

Chile national under-20 football team, also known as Chile Sub-20 or La Rojita, is part of the Federación de Fútbol de Chile. The U-20 team is considered to be the breeding ground for future Chile national football team players. The Chile U-20 national team has participated in seven U-20 World Cups Chile 1987, Qatar 1995, Argentina 2001, Netherlands 2005, Canada 2007, Turkey 2013, and Chile 2025.

One of the best and earliest U-20 World Cup campaigns was when Chile hosted the tournament in 1987, finishing in fourth place. In the most recent 2007 U-20 World Cup the team earned a third-place position, making it Chile's most successful U-20 campaign to date.

The Chile national U-20 football team also participates in the South American Youth Championship which act as qualifier for the U-20 World Cup.

== Chile National U-20 Football Team: World Cups ==
=== U-20 World Cup: Chile 1987 ===
The first World Cup the U-20 national team gained entry came in 1987 when Chile was granted the right to host. Chile headed Group A which included Australia, Togo, and Yugoslavia. October 10, 1987 Chile faced eventual tournament winners Yugoslavia in Santiago in the presence of a crowd totaling 67,000 spectators. All of Chile's early group matches were held in Santiago at the Estadio Nacional. Chile lost the opening game by a score of 2–4, with Lukas Tudor and Camilo Pino scoring for the squad.

Chile won their second match against Togo by a score of 3–0, with Pino scoring through a penalty kick in the '8 minute of the match. Tudor scored the remaining two goals in the 32nd and 75th minute of the match.

The next game against Australia was staged in front of 75,000 people. Chile using the advantage of having support from its crowd, defeated Australia 2–0 with both goals coming from Pino in the 22nd and 52nd minutes of the match.

Chile advanced to the Quarter-Finals in second place, and later played Italy in the city of Concepción, Chile. Chile's margin of victory came with the minimum difference of a 1–0 score. The result in effect would lead ti a face-off against West Germany in the Semi-Finals. The match featured West Germany ultimately winning 4–0. The third place spot was to be played against East Germany where Chile fell on penalty kicks 3–1 after a game that had both sides drawn 1–1.

Date	Venue	Opponents	Result	Score
October 10, 1987	Santiago, Chile	Yugoslavia	L	2 - 4
October 13, 1987	Santiago, Chile	Togo	W	3 - 0
October 17, 1987	Santiago, Chile	Australia	W	2 - 0
October 21, 1987	Concepción, Chile	Italy	W	1 - 0
October 23, 1987	Concepción, Chile	West Germany	L	0 - 4
October 25, 1987	Santiago, Chile	East Germany	D	1(1) - 1(3)

=== U-20 World Cup: Netherlands 2005 ===
June 11, 2005, Chile faced CONCACAF opponents Honduras at the De Vijverberg stadium in Doetinchem, Netherlands, in what was to be the first match pertaining to group C. Massimo Busacca from Switzerland was the referee of the match. Chile, in front of 6,800 spectators, opened the scoring in the first-half with goals from forward Parada in the 11th minute and midfielder José Pedro Fuenzalida in the 30th minute. The scoring momentum continued onto the second-half, where Fuenzalida added another goal onto his personal tally in the 53rd minute, while Matías Fernández followed with a goal of his own in the 67th. Two minutes later, in the 69th, Gonzalo Jara would also score which was followed by another strike from Parada in the 71st. Pedro Morales concluded with the last goal of the day in the 77th minute, making the final score 7–0, an impressive start for "La Rojita".

Four days later, on June 15, 2005, Chile experienced a crushing blow against Spain. The match was again held at De Vijverberg, and the referee in charge was Benito Archundia from Mexico. An estimate of 6,600 spectators were in attendance with Spaniard Fernando Llorente scoring four goals. Chile, playing with ten men witnessed, fell 0–7, bringing their goal differential to zero.

On June 17, 2005, at Galgenwaard Stadion in Utrecht (city), Chile competed against Morocco amid a crowd of 11,000. The referee was Australian Mark Shield. The only goal was scored by Moroccan forward Tarik Bendamou in the 47th minute.

A total of three points was enough for Chile to qualify in a best third place spot for the second round and on June 22, 2005, Chile played hosts Netherlands at De Vijverberg stadium. Dutch forwards Ryan Babel, Quincy Owusu-Abeyie and Collins John would each score for the Dutch in a game finishing 3–0, thus eliminating Chile from the World Cup.

Date	Venue	Opponents	Result	Score
June 11, 2005	Doetinchem, Netherlands	Honduras	W	7 - 0
June 15, 2005	Doetinchem, Netherlands	Spain	L	0 - 7
June 17, 2005	Utrecht, Netherlands	Morocco	L	0 - 1
June 22, 2005	Doetinchem, Netherlands	Netherlands	L	0 - 3

=== U-20 World Cup: Canada 2007 ===
Canada 2007 was Chile's fifth overall participation in the U-20 world youth championship. Chile opened Group A against the host nation of Canada in Toronto, with Chile winning 3–0. The game featured a Chilean side with adequate possession of the ball and attentive striking from forwards Medina, team captain Carlos Carmona, and late game substitute Jaime Grondona.

The second match was against the African youth champions the Republic of Congo in Edmonton. Chile soundly defeated a ten-man squad with a score of 3–0, goals coming from striker Alexis Sánchez, Nicolás Medina and Arturo Vidal.

The third game was against Austria where after 90 minutes the game ended in scoreless 0–0, the result was enough for Chile to clinch the first spot of the group. In the second round, Chile went up against Portugal, who had qualified as third of their group. Chile with a goal from Vidal in the 45th minute of first half secured a pass onto the quarter-final.

The quarter-final included Nigeria, where after a scoreless 90 minutes the game was to be decided in extra time. Within the next final 30 minutes of the match, Chile would win 4–0 with finishes coming off a header from Jaime Grondona, a penalty kick by Mauricio Isla after Chilean player Mathías Vidangossy was brought down in the box, a deadly counter strike finish from Isla in the 117th minute and a late finish from Vidangossy after rounding the goalkeeper in injury time.

The semi-final against Argentina proved controversial where referee Wolfgang Stark would send off two Chilean players, Dagoberto Currimilla and Gary Medel. Playing with nine men proved drastic, as Chile would go on to lose 3–0.

Hans Martínez

Goalkeeper Christopher Toselli set a record after going 492 minutes without conceding a goal, breaking the old record of 484 minutes held by under-20 Brazilian goalkeeper Cláudio Taffarel since the 1985 World Cup.

Alexis Sánchez, Mathías Vidangossy, Arturo Vidal, Cristián Suárez and Christopher Toselli all listed as candidates for top player of the tournament.

Date	Venue	Opponents	Result	Score
July 1, 2007	Toronto, Canada	Canada	W	3 - 0
July 5, 2007	Edmonton, Canada	Congo	W	3 - 0
July 8, 2007	Toronto, Canada	Austria	D	0 - 0
July 12, 2007	Edmonton, Canada	Portugal	W	1 - 0
July 15, 2007	Montreal, Canada	Nigeria	W	4 - 0
July 19, 2007	Toronto, Canada	Argentina	L	0 - 3
July 22, 2007	Toronto, Canada	Austria	W	1 - 0

=== U-20 World Cup: Turkey 2013 ===
Turkey 2013 marks the sixth time the Chilean U-20 team has participated in the U-20 world youth championship. The Chilean team ended the first stage of the championship in second position with 4 points, with a victory against Egypt (2-1), a draw against England (1-1), and a final defeat against Iraq (1-2). Despite the mixed results, the team advanced to the knockout stages, defeating Croatia (2-1).

Date	Venue	Opponents	Result	Score
June 23, 2013	Antalya, Turkey	Egypt	W	2 - 1
June 26, 2013	Antalya, Turkey	England	D	1 - 1
June 29, 2013	Antalya, Turkey	Iraq	L	1 - 2
July 3, 2013	Bursa, Turkey	Croatia	W	2 - 0
July 7, 2013	Istanbul, Turkey	Ghana	L	3- - 4

=== U-20 World Cup: Chile 2025 ===
Chile 2025 will mark the seventh time the Chilean U-20 team has participated in the U-20 world youth championship. It will also mark second time Chile has hosted it having do it in 1987.

== Competitive record ==
Year	Round	GP	W	D	L	GS	GA
(Tunisia) 1977	Did not qualify						
(Japan) 1979	Did not qualify						
(Australia) 1981	Did not qualify						
(Mexico) 1983	Did not qualify						
(Soviet Union) 1985	Did not qualify						
(Chile) 1987	Fourth place	6	3	1	2	9	9
(Saudi Arabia) 1989	Did not qualify						
(Portugal) 1991	Did not qualify						
(Australia) 1993	Did not qualify						
(Qatar) 1995	Round 1	3	0	2	1	6	9
(Malaysia) 1997	Did not qualify						
(Nigeria) 1999	Did not qualify						
(Argentina) 2001	Round 1	3	1	0	2	4	8
(United Arab Emirates) 2003	Did not qualify						
(Netherlands) 2005	Second round	4	1	0	3	7	11
(Canada) 2007	Third place	7	5	1	1	12	3
(Egypt) 2009	Did not qualify						
(Colombia) 2011	Did not qualify						
(Turkey) 2013	Quarterfinals	5	2	1	2	9	8
(New Zealand) 2015	Did not qualify						
(South Korea) 2017	Did not qualify						
(Poland) 2019	Did not qualify						
(Argentina) 2023	Did not qualify						
(Chile) 2025	Round of 16	4	1	0	3	4	9
(Azerbaijan) (Uzbekistan) 2027	To be determined						
(Armenia) (Georgia (country)) 2029	To be determined						
Total	7/26	32	13	5	14	51	57

== Honours ==
- FIFA U-20 World Cup

- Third place (1): 2007
- Fourth place (1): 1987

== List of FIFA U-20 World Cup matches ==
FIFA World Youth Championship U20 History
Year	Round	Score	Result
1987
1987	Round 1	Chile 2 – 4 Yugoslavia	Lose
1987	Round 1	Chile 3 – 0 Togo	Win
1987	Round 1	Chile 2 – 0 Australia	Win
1987	Quarterfinals	Chile 1 – 0 Italy	Win
1987	Semifinals	Chile 0 – 4 West Germany	Lose
1987	3rd Place	Chile 1 – 1 (a.e.t.)(pen 1-3) East Germany	Draw
1995
1995	Round 1	Chile 2 – 2 Japan	Draw
1995	Round 1	Chile 1 – 1 Burundi	Draw
1995	Round 1	Chile 3 – 6 Spain	Lose
2001
2001	Round 1	Chile 2 – 4 Ukraine	Lose
2001	Round 1	Chile 1 – 4 United States	Lose
2001	Round 1	Chile 1 – 0 China	Win
2005
2005	Round 1	Chile 7 – 0 Honduras	Win
2005	Round 1	Chile 0 – 7 Spain	Lose
2005	Round 1	Chile 0 – 1 Morocco	Lose
2005	Round of 16	Chile 0 – 3 Netherlands	Lose
2007
2007	Round 1	Chile 3 – 0 Canada	Win
2007	Round 1	Chile 3 – 0 Congo	Win
2007	Round 1	Chile 0 – 0 Austria	Draw
2007	Round of 16	Chile 1 – 0 Portugal	Win
2007	Quarterfinals	Chile 4 – 0 (a.e.t.) Nigeria	Win
2007	Semifinals	Chile 0 – 3 Argentina	Lose
2007	3rd Place	Chile 1 – 0 Austria	Win
2013
2013	Round 1	Chile 2 – 1 Egypt	Win
2013	Round 1	Chile 1 – 1 England	Draw
2013	Round 1	Chile 1 – 2 Iraq	Lose
2013	Round of 16	Chile 2 – 0 Croatia	Win
2013	Quarterfinals	Chile 3 – 4 (a.e.t.) Ghana	Lose
2025
2025	Round 1	Chile 2 – 1 New Zealand	Win
2025	Round 1	Chile 0 – 2 Japan	Lose
2025	Round 1	Chile 1 – 2 Egypt	Lose
2025	Round of 16	Chile 1 – 4 Mexico	Lose

== Players ==
=== Current squad ===
The following players were called up to the squad for the friendly matches against Mexico on 13 and 16 November 2026.

No.	Pos.	Player	Date of birth (age)	Club
	GK	José Alburquenque	19 July 2007 (aged 19)	(Football Federation of Chile) Universidad de Chile
	GK	Maximiliano Mateluna	9 December 2007 (aged 18)	(Football Federation of Chile) Palestino
	GK	Gabriel Maureira	6 February 2007 (aged 19)	(Football Federation of Chile) Colo-Colo
	DF	Paolo Castro	2007 (age 18–19)	(Football Federation of Chile) Colo-Colo
	DF	Thomas Coulombe	5 July 2007 (aged 19)	(Royal Spanish Football Federation) Espanyol B
	DF	Martín Jiménez	6 February 2008 (aged 18)	(Football Federation of Chile) Audax Italiano
	DF	José Movillo	8 November 2006 (aged 20)	(Football Federation of Chile) O'Higgins
	DF	Alonso Olguín	8 February 2008 (aged 18)	(Football Federation of Chile) Colo-Colo
	DF	Juan Poblete	1 March 2007 (aged 19)	(Football Federation of Chile) O'Higgins
	DF	Gabriel Rodríguez	2009 (age 16–17)	(Football Federation of Chile) Universidad Católica
	DF	Cristopher Valenzuela	20 October 2007 (aged 19)	(Football Federation of Chile) Santiago Wanderers
	MF	Jetzen Lopez	14 January 2007 (aged 19)	(Portuguese Football Federation) Braga
	MF	Benjamín Pérez	22 July 2007 (aged 19)	(Football Federation of Chile) O'Higgins
	MF	Antonio Riquelme	8 August 2008 (aged 18)	(United States Soccer Federation) Real Salt Lake
	MF	Mario Sandoval	7 August 2007 (aged 19)	(Football Federation of Chile) Audax Italiano
	MF	Joaquín Soto	3 April 2007 (aged 19)	(Football Federation of Chile) Unión La Calera
	MF	Milovan Velásquez	26 July 2007 (aged 19)	(Football Federation of Chile) Deportes La Serena
	MF	Cristóbal Villarroel	6 February 2007 (aged 19)	(Football Federation of Chile) Santiago Wanderers
	MF	Vicente Zenteno	25 September 2007 (aged 19)	(Football Federation of Chile) Audax Italiano
	FW	Ian Alegría	3 May 2008 (aged 18)	(Football Federation of Chile) Palestino
	MF	Diego Cofré	6 January 2008 (aged 18)	(Football Federation of Chile) Universidad de Chile
	FW	Maximiliano Fernández	21 November 2007 (aged 18)	(Football Federation of Chile) Unión La Calera
	FW	Ignacio Flores	2 February 2007 (aged 19)	(Football Federation of Chile) Santiago Wanderers
	FW	Vicente Ramírez	25 April 2007 (aged 19)	(Football Federation of Chile) Universidad de Chile
	FW	Roberto Risnaes	29 January 2007 (aged 19)	(Danish Football Association) Hvidovre
	FW	Cristian Rocha	11 May 2007 (aged 19)	(Football Federation of Chile) Deportes Temuco
	FW	Vicente Vargas	6 January 2007 (aged 19)	(Football Federation of Chile) Santiago Wanderers
	FW	Zidane Yáñez	26 January 2008 (aged 18)	(United States Soccer Federation) Huntsville City

== Former squads ==
=== 1987 FIFA World Youth Championship ===
Coach: Luis Ibarra (Chile)

#	Name	Pos	DOB	Club
1	Guillermo Velasco	GK	02.06.1968	Santiago Wanderers (Chile)
2	Mauricio Soto	DF	21.02.1969	Deportes Puerto Montt (Chile)
3	Carlos Ramírez	DF	26.02.1968	Huachipato (Chile)
4	Hugo Cortez	DF	03.06.1968	Cobreandino (Chile)
5	Javier Margas	DF	10.05.1969	Colo-Colo (Chile)
6	Luis Musrri	MF	24.12.1969	Universidad de Chile
7	Raimundo Tupper	FW	07.01.1969	Universidad Católica (Chile)
8	Sandro Navarrete	MF	16.11.1968	Huachipato (Chile)
9	Lukas Tudor	FW	21.02.1969	Universidad Católica (Chile)
10	Fabián Estay	MF	05.10.1968	Universidad Católica (Chile)
11	Pedro González	FW	17.10.1967	Deportes Valdivia (Chile)
12	Gerhard Reiher	GK	21.04.1968	Provincial Osorno (Chile)
13	Miguel Latín	DF	27.07.1968	Santiago Wanderers (Chile)
14	Juan Carreño	FW	16.11.1968	Colo-Colo (Chile)
15	Reinaldo Hoffmann	DF	18.03.1968	Colo-Colo (Chile)
16	Héctor Cabello	MF	14.01.1968	Deportes La Serena (Chile)
17	Camilo Pino	MF	04.03.1968	Cobreloa (Chile)
18	Juan Reyes	FW	31.08.1967	O'Higgins (Chile)

=== 1995 FIFA World Youth Championship ===
Coach: Leonardo Véliz (Chile)

#	Name	Pos	DOB	Club
1	Carlos Toro	GK	02.04.1976	Santiago Wanderers (Chile)
2	Francisco Fernández	DF	19.08.1975	Colo-Colo (Chile)
3	Mauricio Donoso	MF	30.04.1976	Cobreloa (Chile)
4	Nelson Garrido	DF	02.12.1977	Universidad Católica (Chile)
5	Jorge Vargas	DF	08.02.1976	Universidad Católica (Chile)
6	Dion Valle	DF	22.07.1977	Colo-Colo (Chile)
7	Rodrigo Valenzuela	FW	27.11.1975	Unión Española (Chile)
8	Carlos Barraza	MF	12.03.1976	Universidad Católica (Chile)
9	Alejandro Osorio	MF	24.09.1976	Universidad Católica (Chile)
10	Frank Lobos	MF	25.09.1976	Colo-Colo (Chile)
11	Sebastián Rozental	FW	01.09.1976	Universidad Católica (Chile)
12	Ariel Salas	GK	19.10.1976	Colo-Colo (Chile)
13	Héctor Tapia	FW	30.09.1977	Colo-Colo (Chile)
14	Cristián Uribe	MF	01.08.1976	Huachipato (Chile)
15	Fernando Martel	MF	02.10.1975	Unión San Felipe (Chile)
16	Mauricio Aros	DF	09.03.1976	Deportes Concepción (Chile)
17	Juan Carlos Madrid	FW	20.10.1975	Universidad Católica (Chile)
18	Dante Poli	DF	15.08.1976	Universidad Católica (Chile)

=== 2001 FIFA World Youth Championship ===
Coach: Hector Pinto (Chile)

#	Name	Pos	DOB	Club
1	Johnny Herrera	GK	09.05.1981	Universidad de Chile
2	Sergio Fernández	DF	14.06.1981	Colo-Colo (Chile)
3	Daniel Campos	MF	17.07.1981	Deportes Concepción (Chile)
4	Hugo Droguett	DF	02.09.1982	Universidad Católica (Chile)
5	Luis Oyarzún	DF	24.05.1982	Palestino (Chile)
6	Nelson Pinto	MF	01.02.1981	Universidad de Chile
7	Gonzalo Villagra	MF	17.09.1981	Universidad Católica (Chile)
8	Sebastián Pardo	MF	01.01.1982	Universidad de Chile
9	Mario Cáceres	FW	17.03.1981	Sporting CP (Portugal)
10	Jaime Valdés	MF	11.01.1981	Bari (Italy)
11	Mario Salgado	FW	03.07.1981	Huachipato (Chile)
12	Gino Reyes	DF	23.02.1981	Colo-Colo (Chile)
13	Joel Soto	FW	09.04.1982	Santiago Wanderers (Chile)
14	Adán Vergara	DF	09.05.1981	Cobreloa (Chile)
15	Mario Berríos	MF	20.08.1981	Palestino (Chile)
16	Roberto Órdenes	MF	05.01.1981	Unión Española (Chile)
17	Rodrigo Millar	MF	03.11.1981	Huachipato (Chile)
18	Eduardo Lobos	GK	30.07.1981	Colo-Colo (Chile)

=== 2005 FIFA World Youth Championship ===
Coach: José Sulantay (Chile)

#	Name	Pos	DOB	Club
1	Carlos Espinoza	GK	23.02.1985	Deportes Puerto Montt (Chile)
2	Edzon Riquelme	DF	29.08.1985	Deportes Concepción (Chile)
3	Sebastián Páez	MF	13.08.1986	Deportes La Serena (Chile)
4	Sebastián Montecinos	DF	12.03.1986	Colo-Colo (Chile)
5	Hugo Bascuñán	DF	11.01.1985	Deportivo Italmaracaibo (Venezuela)
6	Marcelo Díaz	MF	30.12.1986	Universidad de Chile
7	Fernando Meneses	MF	27.09.1985	Colo-Colo (Chile)
8	Iván Vásquez	MF	13.08.1985	Universidad Católica (Chile)
9	Nicolás Canales	FW	27.06.1985	Universidad de Chile
10	Pedro Morales	MF	25.05.1985	Huachipato (Chile)
11	Eduardo Tudela	FW	03.03.1986	Cobreloa (Chile)
12	Carlos Arias	GK	04.09.1986	Universidad Católica (Chile)
13	Felipe Muñoz	DF	04.04.1985	Colo-Colo (Chile)
14	Matías Fernández	MF	15.05.1986	Colo-Colo (Chile)
15	Carlos Carmona	MF	21.02.1987	Coquimbo Unido (Chile)
16	Francisco Sánchez	DF	06.02.1985	Everton (Chile)
17	Carlos Villanueva	FW	05.02.1986	Audax Italiano (Chile)
18	Gonzalo Jara	DF	29.08.1985	Huachipato (Chile)
19	José Pedro Fuenzalida	MF	22.02.1985	Universidad Católica (Chile)
20	Ricardo Parada	FW	02.01.1985	Universidad de Concepción (Chile)
21	José Rosales	GK	20.09.1985	O'Higgins (Chile)
22	Juan Gonzalo Lorca	FW	15.01.1985	Colo-Colo (Chile)

=== 2007 FIFA U-20 World Cup ===
Coach: José Sulantay (Chile)

#	Name	Pos	DOB	Club
1	Cristopher Toselli	GK	15.06.1988	Universidad Católica (Chile)
2	Cristián Suárez	DF	06.02.1987	Unión San Felipe (Chile)
3	Mauricio Isla	MF	12.06.1988	Universidad Católica (Chile)
4	Eric Godoy	DF	26.03.1987	Santiago Wanderers (Chile)
5	Nicolás Larrondo	DF	04.10.1987	Universidad de Chile
6	Gary Medel	MF	03.08.1987	Universidad Católica (Chile)
7	Alexis Sánchez	FW	19.12.1988	Udinese (Italy)
8	Dagoberto Currimilla	MF	26.12.1987	Huachipato (Chile)
9	Nicolás Medina	FW	28.03.1987	Universidad de Chile
10	Juan Pablo Arenas	MF	22.04.1987	Colo-Colo (Chile)
11	Jaime Grondona	FW	15.04.1987	Santiago Wanderers (Chile)
12	Nery Veloso	GK	02.03.1987	Huachipato (Chile)
13	Christian Sepúlveda	DF	23.05.1987	Unión Española (Chile)
14	Arturo Vidal	DF	22.05.1987	Colo-Colo (Chile)
15	Carlos Carmona	MF	21.02.1987	Coquimbo Unido (Chile)
16	Gerardo Cortés	MF	17.05.1988	Colo-Colo (Chile)
17	Hans Martínez	DF	04.01.1987	Universidad Católica (Chile)
18	Mathías Vidangossy	FW	25.05.1987	Villarreal (Spain)
19	Michael Silva	FW	12.03.1988	Atlante (Mexico)
20	Isaías Peralta	MF	21.08.1987	Unión Española (Chile)

=== 2013 FIFA U-20 World Cup ===
Coach: Mario Salas (Chile)

#	Name	Pos	DOB	Club
1	Dario Melo	GK	24.03.1993	Palestino (Chile)
2	Felipe Campos	DF	08.11.1993	Palestino (Chile)
3	Alejandro Contreras	DF	03.03.1993	Palestino (Chile)
4	Valber Huerta	DF	26.8.1993	Universidad de Chile
5	Igor Lichnovsky	DF	07.03.1994	Universidad de Chile
6	Sebastian Martínez	MF	06.06.1993	Universidad de Chile
7	Christian Bravo	FW	01.10.1993	Inter Zaprešić (Croatia)
8	Andrés Robles	DF	07.05.1994	Santiago Wanderers (Chile)
9	Felipe Mora	FW	02.08.1993	Audax Italiano (Chile)
10	Nicolás Maturana	MF	08.06.1993	Universidad de Chile
11	Angelo Henriquez	FW	13.04.1994	Manchester United (England)
12	Brayan Cortés	GK	29.05.1995	Deportes Iquique (Chile)
13	Óscar Hernández	MF	03.07.1994	Unión Española (Chile)
14	Bryan Rabello	MF	16.05.1994	Sevilla (Spain)
15	Cristián Cuevas	FW	02.04.1995	O'Higgins (Chile)
16	César Fuentes	MF	12.04.1993	O'Higgins (Chile)
18	Nicolás Castillo	FW	14.02.1993	Universidad Católica (Chile)
19	Mario Larenas	DF	27.06.1994	Union Española (Chile)
20	Claudio Baeza	DF	23.12.1993	Colo-Colo (Chile)
21	Álvaro Salazar	GK	24.03.1993	Colo-Colo (Chile)

== See also ==
- South American Youth Championship
- Chile national under-17 football team
- Chile (Senior) team

== Head-to-head record ==
The following table shows Chile's head-to-head record in FIFA U-20 World Cup.

Opponent	Pld	W	D	L	GF	GA	GD	Win %
Argentina	1	0	0	1	0	3	−3	0.00
Australia	1	1	0	0	2	0	+2	100.00
Austria	2	1	1	0	1	0	+1	50.00
Burundi	1	0	1	0	1	1	+0	0.00
Canada	1	1	0	0	3	0	+3	100.00
China	1	1	0	0	1	0	+1	100.00
Congo	1	1	0	0	3	0	+3	100.00
Croatia	1	1	0	0	2	0	+2	100.00
East Germany	1	0	1	0	1	1	+0	0.00
Egypt	2	1	0	1	3	3	+0	50.00
England	1	0	1	0	1	1	+0	0.00
Germany	1	0	0	1	0	4	−4	0.00
Ghana	1	0	0	1	3	4	−1	0.00
Honduras	1	1	0	0	7	0	+7	100.00
Iraq	1	0	0	1	1	2	−1	0.00
Italy	1	1	0	0	1	0	+1	100.00
Japan	2	0	1	1	2	4	−2	0.00
Mexico	1	0	0	1	1	4	−3	0.00
Morocco	1	0	0	1	0	1	−1	0.00
Netherlands	1	0	0	1	0	3	−3	0.00
New Zealand	1	1	0	0	2	1	+1	100.00
Nigeria	1	1	0	0	4	0	+4	100.00
Portugal	1	1	0	0	1	0	+1	100.00
Spain	2	0	0	2	3	13	−10	0.00
Togo	1	1	0	0	3	0	+3	100.00
Ukraine	1	0	0	1	2	4	−2	0.00
United States	1	0	0	1	1	4	−3	0.00
Yugoslavia	1	0	0	1	2	4	−2	0.00
Total	32	13	5	14	51	57	−6	40.63
