= Yinka Adedeji =

Nigerian international footballer

Personal information
- Full name: Michael Adeyinka Adedeji
- Date of birth: 24 March 1985 (age 41)
- Place of birth: Lagos, Nigeria
- Height: 1.79 m (5 ft 10 in)
- Position: Left back

Team information
- Current team: Shooting Stars F.C.
- Number: 23

Youth career
- Pepsi Football Academy

Senior career*
Years	Team	Apps	(Gls)
2005	GIF Sundsvall	1	(0)
2006–2008	Shooting Stars F.C.	37	
2008–	Sunshine Stars F.C.	32	
2010	→ Pyunik Yerevan (loan)	13	(0)
2013	Sharks F.C. (loan)	14	(0)
2016	Shooting Stars F.C. (loan)		

International career
2005	Nigeria U-20	7	(1)
2008	Nigeria U-23	5	(0)
- * Club domestic league appearances and goals

Michael Adeyinka Adedeji (born 24 March 1985 in Lagos) is a Nigerian international footballer. He currently plays for Shooting Stars F.C. In 2010, he went on loan to Pyunik F.C. in Yerevan and played in the 2010 Champions League qualifiers against the Serbian champions FK Partizan Belgrade. Presently, Adedeji is an important player in the Shooting Stars F.C. having a great season but only as a loan player.

== International career ==
Adedeji was on the 2005 FIFA World Youth Championship runners-up. He also played for the Nigerian B team in the 2011 WAFU Nations Cup.
