= Felipe Muñoz (footballer) =

Chilean footballer (born 1985)

Personal information
- Full name: Felipe Andrés Muñoz Flores
- Date of birth: 4 April 1985 (age 41)
- Place of birth: Santiago, Chile
- Height: 1.76 m (5 ft 9 in)
- Positions: Centre back; right back

Youth career
- ?–2004: Colo-Colo

Senior career*
Years	Team	Apps	(Gls)
2004–2005	Colo-Colo	16	(0)
2006	Coquimbo Unido	27	(0)
2007	Palestino	18	(1)
2007–2017	U. de Concepción	240	(6)
2012	→ Cobreloa (loan)	30	(0)
2018	Coquimbo Unido	1	(0)

International career^{‡}
2005	Chile U20	4	(0)
- * Club domestic league appearances and goals as of 29 June 2018 ‡ National team caps and goals as of 23 March 2020

Felipe Andrés Muñoz Flores (born 4 April 1985) is a Chilean football player as a defender.

Felipe Muñoz represented to the Chilean team in the 2005 FIFA U-20 World Cup celebrated in the Netherlands, Muñoz played all matches of the national team in the World Cup.

He achieved his first professional title in the Copa Chile 2009, after of defeat 2–1 to Deportes Ovalle.
