= Sebastián Páez =

Chilean footballer (born 1986)

Personal information
- Full name: Sebastián Eduardo Páez Aravena
- Date of birth: 13 August 1986 (age 40)
- Place of birth: La Serena, Chile
- Height: 1.78 m (5 ft 10 in)
- Position: Midfielder

Youth career
- Deportes La Serena

Senior career*
Years	Team	Apps	(Gls)
2004–2006	Deportes La Serena	51	(2)
2007	Unión San Felipe	30	(8)
2008	Provincial Osorno	19	(2)
2009	Curicó Unido	23	(1)
2010–2013	Unión San Felipe	82	(2)
2011	→ FC Brașov (loan)	6	(0)
2013–2014	San Marcos de Arica	31	(3)
2014–2015	Deportes Temuco	28	(5)
2015–2016	Barnechea	15	(1)
2016–2017	Ñublense	34	(5)
Total		319	(29)

International career
2005	Chile U20		
- * Club domestic league appearances and goals

Sebastián Eduardo Páez Aravena (born 13 August 1986) is a Chilean former footballer who played as a midfielder.

== Club career ==
Romanian club FC Brașov has announced on 11 June 2011 that they have loaned Páez for the following season.

== International career ==
He represented Chile at under-20 level in the 2005 FIFA World Youth Championship.

== Honours ==
- Primera B de Chile: 2013–14
