= Andriy Derkach (footballer) =

Ukrainian footballer

Personal information
- Full name: Andriy Volodymyrovych Derkach
- Date of birth: 28 May 1985 (age 41)
- Place of birth: Boryspil, Ukrainian SSR
- Height: 1.84 m (6 ft 0 in)
- Position: Midfielder

Youth career
- 1998–2002: Borysfen Shchaslyve

Senior career*
Years	Team	Apps	(Gls)
2001–2005	Borysfen Boryspil	27	(2)
2002–2004	→ Borysfen-2 Boryspil	42	(3)
2004	→ Boreks-Borysfen Borodianka	14	(1)
2005–2007	Shakhtar Donetsk	0	(0)
2005–2006	→ Shakhtar-2 Donetsk	19	(0)
2006–2007	→ Shakhtar-3 Donetsk	9	(0)
2008	Dnipro Cherkasy	18	(2)
2008	Volyn Lutsk	4	(0)
2009	Zakarpattia Uzhhorod	8	(0)
2009–2010	Prykarpattya Ivano-Frankivsk	35	(1)
2011	Helios Kharkiv	26	(2)
2012	Zimbru Chișinău	31	(0)
2013	Poltava	23	(5)
2014	Mash'al Mubarek	22	(2)
2015–2016	Qizilqum Zarafshon	40	(4)
2016	Mash'al Mubarek	10	(0)
2017	Qizilqum Zarafshon	1	(0)
2017–2018	Arsenal Kyiv	31	(1)
2018	Dnepr Mogilev	10	(0)
2019	Sumy	4	(0)
2019	Hirnyk-Sport Horishni Plavni	4	(0)

International career
2005	Ukraine U21	5	(0)
- * Club domestic league appearances and goals as of 31 December 2019

Andriy Derkach (Ukrainian: Андрій Володимирович Деркач; born 28 May 1985) is a Ukrainian former footballer.
