= Job Bulters =

Dutch footballer (born 1986)

Personal information
- Date of birth: 22 March 1986 (age 40)
- Place of birth: Haarlem, Netherlands
- Height: 1.85 m (6 ft 1 in)
- Position: Goalkeeper

Youth career
- SV Hoofddorp
- AZ

Senior career*
Years	Team	Apps	(Gls)
2006–2007	AZ	3	(0)
2007–2008	Telstar	1	(0)
2008–2012	MVV	61	(0)
2012–2013	Helmond Sport	0	(0)
2013–2014	Turnhout	2	(0)
2014–2018	EHC		
Total		67	(0)

International career
2006–2007	Netherlands U21	1	(0)
- * Club domestic league appearances and goals

Job Bulters (born 22 March 1986) is a Dutch former professional footballer who played as a goalkeeper.

== Club career ==
Bulters made his breakthrough for AZ's first squad in 2006, when first and second keeper, Joey Didulica and Khalid Sinouh, were injured. After some luckless games, AZ brought Ronald Waterreus to the club as a replacement. Bulters' contract was not extended at the end of the season. Therefore, he continued his career at Stormvogels Telstar, making his debut on 11 April 2008 in a 0–3 loss to FC Den Bosch, which would prove to be his only appearance for the club. The following season he was signed as the backup goalkeeper behind Ruud Boffin at MVV Maastricht.

On 19 August 2012 he signed a one-year deal with Helmond Sport. He moved abroad to play for Belgian side Turnhout, only to return to the Netherlands a year later to join amateurs EHC Hoensbroek. He announced his retirement a year later.

== International career ==
In 2005, he was part of the Dutch squad at the FIFA World Youth Championship.
