= Carlos Espinoza (footballer, born 1985) =

Chilean football goalkeeper

Personal information
- Full name: Carlos Alberto Espinoza Loayza
- Date of birth: 23 February 1985 (age 41)
- Place of birth: Osorno, Chile
- Height: 1.88 m (6 ft 2 in)
- Position: Goalkeeper

Youth career
- Deportes Puerto Montt

Senior career*
Years	Team	Apps	(Gls)
2004–2008	Deportes Puerto Montt	107	(0)
2009	Huachipato	4	(0)
2010–2012	Deportes Puerto Montt	80	(0)
2013–2014	Coquimbo Unido	5	(0)
2015	Western Suburbs	4	(0)
2015	Oakleigh Cannons	1	(0)
2016	Geelong SC	–	(–)
2017	North Geelong Warriors	–	(–)
Total		201	(0)

International career
2005	Chile U20	1	(0)

Managerial career
- 2018–2021: Deportes Puerto Montt (gk coach)
- * Club domestic league appearances and goals

Carlos Alberto Espinoza Loayza (born 23 February 1985) is a Chilean former football goalkeeper. He played for Geelong SC in the Victorian State League Division 2 North-West in Victoria, Australia and previously played for Deportes Puerto Montt and Huachipato in the Chilean Primera División, and for Deportes Puerto Montt and Coquimbo Unido in the Primera B.

== Club career ==
Espinoza began his senior career with Deportes Puerto Montt, with whom he spent several seasons playing in the Chilean Primera División. He moved on to Huachipato for the 2009 season, before returning to Puerto Montt for three seasons Primera B seasons, followed by one with Coquimbo Unido.

Espinoza signed for Oakleigh Cannons FC on a short-term basis in September 2015, after impressing for Victorian State League Division 1 side Western Suburbs SC.

Espinoza then moved to Geelong SC in April 2016.

Espinoza retired in 2017.

== International career ==
Espinoza was a member of the Chile under-20 team at the 2005 FIFA U-20 World Cup: he made one appearance, in the round of 16 as Chile lost 3–0 to the Netherlands.

== Coaching career ==
Following his retirement, Espinoza served as a goalkeeping coach for Deportes Puerto Montt and next he started a goalkeeping academy.

== Personal life ==
Espinoza is nicknamed Chila on his inner circle and Shrek at sports level.

Back to Chile from Australia, Espinoza started a ceviche business.
