= Bluelake Mineral =

Swedish mining company

Bluelake Mineral, formerly IGE Resources and Nickel Mountain Group AB, is a mining company based in Stockholm, Sweden. The company changed its name in early 2014 and then again in 2020.

The company is developing the production of nickel from the Rönnbäcken nickel sulphide deposit in Sweden.

As IGE Resources the company operated diamond mines in the Democratic Republic of Congo and in South Africa.

The Company was a strategic investment of Waterton Global Value LP before selling its stake to Amarant Mining.
