= Roberto Giacomi =

Canadian soccer player

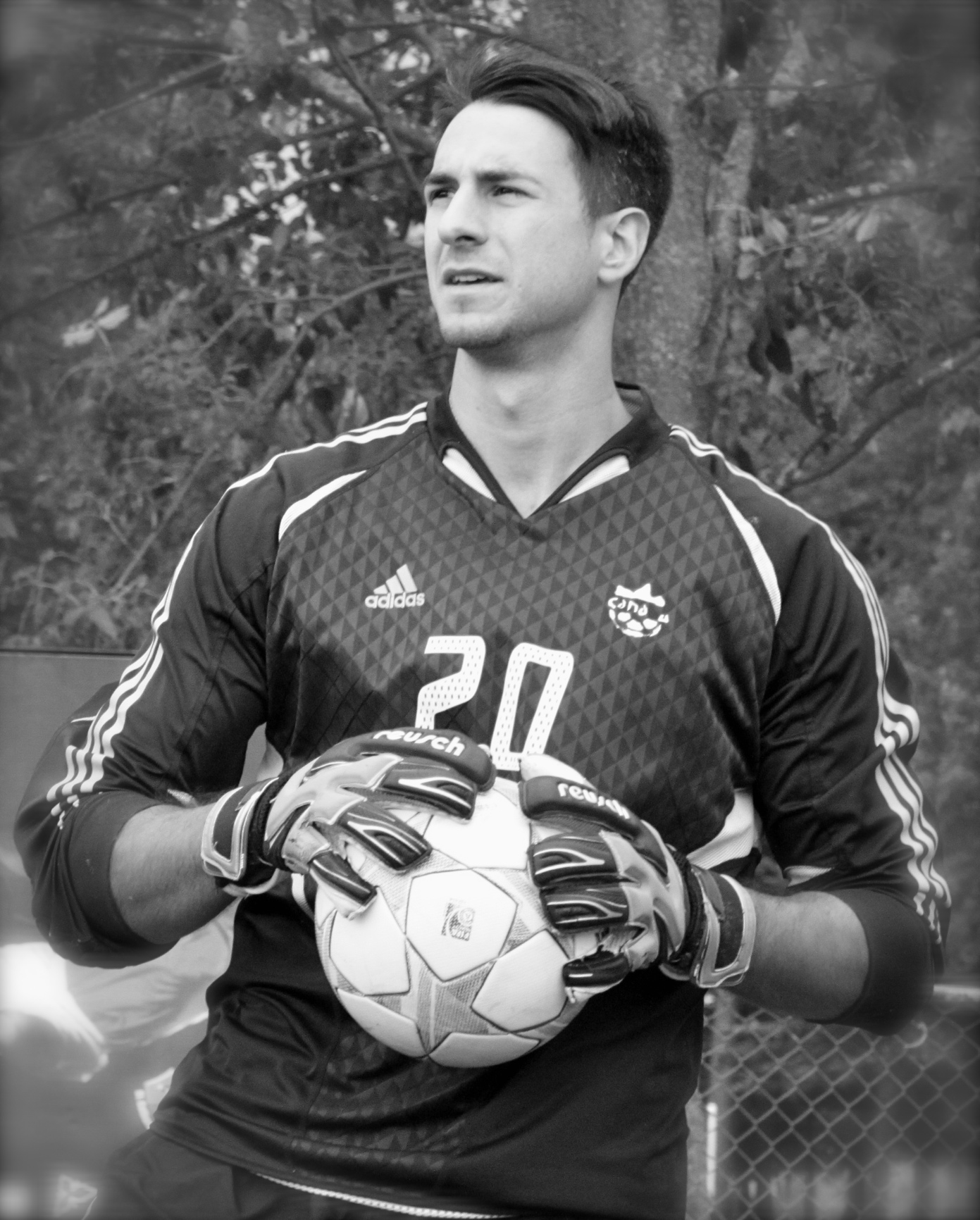

Personal information
- Full name: Roberto Giacomi
- Date of birth: August 1, 1986 (age 40)
- Place of birth: Toronto, Ontario, Canada
- Height: 1.98 m (6 ft 6 in)
- Position: Goalkeeper

Youth career
- 1999–2004: Markham Lightning

Senior career*
Years	Team	Apps	(Gls)
2004–2006	Rangers (Reserve)	52	(0)
2005	→ Stirling Albion (loan)	4	(0)
2007	KSK Beveren	12	(0)
2008–2009	Kristiansund BK	21	(0)
2011	Averøykameratene	26	(0)

International career
2001–2005	Canada U17	17	(0)
- * Club domestic league appearances and goals

Roberto Giacomi (born August 1, 1986) is a Canadian former professional soccer player who played as a goalkeeper.

== Career ==
While with Markham Lightning he went on to win numerous tournaments and maintain the best goals against average in the league each year at the club. At this time Giacomi also established himself as the number one goalkeeper for the Ontario Soccer Association and the Canadian Soccer Association

In November 2006 Giacomi left Rangers and joined KSK Beveren in the Jupiler League in Belgium. Giacomi immediately impressed at the club becoming a fan favorite and battled for the number one position with 1st choice goalkeeper Boubacar Barry. Giacomi played 4 matches against the likes of R.S.C. Anderlecht for the club.

== International career ==
Giacomi represented Canada at the FIFA U-20 World Cup in the Netherlands in 2005 in a group with Syria, Colombia and Italy. Giacomi was called up to the 2007 CONCACAF Gold Cup where the Canadian Men's Team made it to the semi-final round against USA.
