= Palmiro Di Dio =

Italian football defender

Personal information
- Full name: Palmiro Di Dio
- Date of birth: 6 July 1985 (age 41)
- Place of birth: Benevento, Italy
- Height: 1.86 m (6 ft 1 in)
- Position: Defender

Youth career
- ? – 2003: Sora

Senior career*
Years	Team	Apps	(Gls)
2003–2004	Ternana	1	(0)
2004–2005	→ Fermana (loan)	1	(0)
2005–2006	→ Acireale (loan)	26	(1)
2006–2007	→ Reggina (loan)	6	(0)
2007–2008	→ Bari (loan)	9	(1)
2008–2010	Ternana	21	(1)
2010	Foggia	12	(0)
2010-2011	FC Lugano	14	(1)
2011-2016	FC Rapperswil-Jona	119	(27)
2016-2018	FC Freienbach	52	(9)

International career^{‡}
2004	Italy U-19	3	(1)
2005	Italy U-20	2	(0)
- * Club domestic league appearances and goals ‡ National team caps and goals as of June 2007

Palmiro Di Dio (born 6 July 1985) is an Italian former football (soccer) defender.

== Football career ==
Ternana Calcio, which was relegated to Serie C1 in summer 2006, sold half of the player rights to Reggina Calcio, but he was bought back in summer 2007, and loaned to Bari on 30 August.

He was the unused member of the Italian U-20 team on 2005 FIFA World Youth Championship.
