= Ahmed Khalifa =

Egyptian footballer (born 1985)

Personal information
- Full name: Ahmed Khalifa
- Date of birth: March 23, 1985 (age 41)
- Place of birth: Ismailia, Egypt
- Height: 1.74 m (5 ft 9 in)
- Position: Midfielder

Team information
- Current team: El-Olympi
- Number: 16

Youth career
- Ismaily SC

Senior career*
Years	Team	Apps	(Gls)
2005–2009	Ismaily SC		
2009–2010	Tersana SC		
2010–2011	Omayya SC		
2011	Terbune Buke		
2012–Present	El-Olympi	21	(2)

International career^{‡}
2005–2007	Egypt U-20	24	(4)
2007	Egypt U-23		
- * Club domestic league appearances and goals as of 15 July 2013 ‡ National team caps and goals as of 15 July 2008

Ahmed Khalifa (born March 23, 1985) is an Egyptian football player who plays as a midfielder for the Egyptian team El-Olympi. He was a member of Egyptian U-21 youth team, participating in 2005 FIFA World Youth Championship held in Netherlands.

== Honours ==
=== National team ===
- Gold Medalist at Qatar U23 International Tournament 2007.
- Silver Medalist at CAF Youth African Cup 2005.
- U20 World Cup 2005 - Netherlands

=== Ismaily SC ===
- Egyptian Premier League: Runner-up 2007–2008, 2008–2009
- Arab Champions League: Q-Final 2008-2009
