= Ricardo Parada =

Chilean footballer (born 1985)

Personal information
- Full name: Ricardo Alex Parada Saéz
- Date of birth: January 2, 1985 (age 41)
- Place of birth: San Pedro de la Paz, Chile
- Height: 1.74 m (5 ft 8 1/2 in)
- Position: Striker

Youth career
- 1997–2003: Universidad de Concepción

Senior career*
Years	Team	Apps	(Gls)
2003–2007	Universidad de Concepción	78	(19)
2003	→ Ñublense (loan)	–	(–)
2004	→ Ñublense (loan)	–	(–)
2008	Lobos BUAP	11	(4)
2008	Provincial Osorno	14	(3)
2009	Deportes Antofagasta	7	(0)
2009	Curicó Unido	5	(0)
2010–2011	Deportes Puerto Montt	21	(1)
2012–2013	Deportes Copiapó	30	(14)
2014	Deportes Valdivia	0	(0)
2015–2016	Naval	11	(0)
Total		177	(41)

International career
2005	Chile U20	8	(2)
- * Club domestic league appearances and goals

Ricardo Alex Parada Sáez (born January 2, 1985), is a Chilean former footballer who last played as a striker.

== Career ==
Ricardo Parada, also known by his nickname Pescadito (Little Fish), is a former footballer from the lower divisions of the Club Deportivo Universidad de Concepción, where he was always the top-scorer.

In 2003, he was sent to Ñublense, until the second half of 2004, having won the third division championship, when he returned to the Club Deportivo Universidad de Concepción. He scored 5 goals in the Clausura championship in 2007. In 2008, he was signed by the Lobos de la BUAP, a Mexican football club. In the second half of that year, he was signed by Provincial Osorno. Since then, he has played with Antofagasta, Curicó Unido, Deportes Puerto Montt, Deportes Copiapó and Naval.

== National team ==
Parada played for Chile at the 2005 FIFA U-20 World Cup, where they were eliminated in the first knockout round.

== Honours ==
Ñublense

- Tercera División: 2004
