= Kola Ige =

Nigerian footballer

Personal information
- Date of birth: 28 December 1985 (age 40)
- Place of birth: Nigeria
- Height: 1.86 m (6 ft 1 in)
- Position: Goalkeeper

Team information
- Current team: Bayelsa United F.C.
- Number: 21

Senior career*
| Years | Team | Apps | (Gls) |
| 2005–2007 | Shooting Stars F.C. | | |
| 2007–present | Bayelsa United F.C. | | |
- * Club domestic league appearances and goals as of 25 March 2008

Kola Ige(born 28 December 1985 in Nigeria) is a Nigerian footballer. He currently plays for Bayelsa United F.C. in Nigeria.

== International career ==
He was member of the Nigeria U-20 team by 2005 FIFA World Youth Championship in the Netherlands, but didn't appear in the tournament.
