= Ernane (footballer, born May 1985) =

Brazilian footballer

Personal information
- Full name: Ernane Ferreira Cavalheira Campos
- Date of birth: May 2, 1985 (age 41)
- Place of birth: Nilópolis, Brazil
- Height: 1.76 m (5 ft 9 in)
- Position: Attacking midfielder

Youth career
- 2001–2005: Bahia

Senior career*
| Years | Team | Apps | (Gls) |
| 2006–2007 | Vasco | 41 | (4) |
| 2008 | Ipatinga (Loan) | | |
| 2008 | Vasco | | |
| 2009 | Cabofriense | | |
| 2010 | Figueirense | | |
| 2011 | Tombense | | |
| 2012 | Aparecidense | | |
| 2012-2014 | Al-Shahaniya | | |
| 2015 | Itumbiara | | |
- * Club domestic league appearances and goals

Ernane Ferreira Cavalheira Campos or simply Ernane (born May 2, 1985, in Nilópolis), is a Brazilian attacking midfielder. He currently is retired.

== Honours ==
- Bahia state Cup: 2002
- World Cup (U 20): 2005
- Marseille Tournament: 2002
- Chile Octagonal Tournament: 2005

== Contract ==
- 2 January 2007 to 2 January 2011
