= United Arab Emirates national football team all-time record =

This article lists the United Arab Emirates national football team all-time head-to-head record with other official FIFA members and records in competitive tournaments.

== Head-to-head record ==
=== AFC ===
Last updated at 17 November 2026

Positive Record Neutral Record Negative Record

Opponent	Pld	W	D	L	GF	GA	GD	Last Match
Australia	7	1	2	4	2	7	−5	7 June 2022
Bahrain	34	16	7	12	57	46	+11	27 September 2026
Bangladesh	5	5	0	0	21	1	+20	18 March 2016
Brunei	2	2	0	0	16	0	+16	4 May 2001
China	11	2	5	4	7	17	−10	6 October 2011
Hong Kong	4	3	1	0	12	2	+10	14 January 2024
India	14	10	2	2	32	7	+25	29 March 2021
Indonesia	6	4	1	1	18	8	+10	11 June 2021
Iran	21	1	3	17	5	31	−26	20 March 2025
Iraq	32	7	13	12	31	46	−15	18 November 2025
Japan	20	6	8	6	18	22	−4	23 March 2017
Jordan	19	11	4	4	31	17	+14	3 December 2025
Kuwait	45	18	8	19	54	78	−24	9 December 2025
Kyrgyzstan	5	4	1	0	11	3	+8	10 June 2025
Laos	3	3	0	0	9	0	+9	11 September 2018
Lebanon	15	10	4	1	27	14	+13	17 October 2023
Malaysia	12	10	0	2	32	7	+25	3 June 2021
Myanmar	2	2	0	0	3	0	+3	28 August 2015
Nepal	3	3	0	0	19	0	+19	6 June 2024
North Korea	13	4	5	4	11	13	−2	25 March 2025
Oman	35	16	13	6	48	26	+22	3 October 2026
Pakistan	5	5	0	0	17	4	+13	15 November 2006
Palestine	6	2	3	1	7	3	+4	18 January 2024
Philippines	1	1	0	0	4	0	+4	9 November 2013
Qatar	38	12	11	15	52	51	+1	30 September 2026
Saudi Arabia	37	8	8	21	27	53	−26	6 October 2026
Singapore	6	5	1	0	16	5	+11	12 September 2007
South Korea	23	3	6	14	17	42	−25	29 March 2022
Sri Lanka	8	8	0	0	35	3	+32	31 August 2019
Syria	26	15	8	3	44	21	+23	17 November 2026
Tajikistan	3	1	2	0	4	3	+1	28 January 2024
Thailand	13	8	3	2	21	12	+9	28 March 2023
Timor-Leste	2	2	0	0	9	0	+9	12 November 2015
Turkmenistan	4	2	1	1	9	4	+5	5 November 2015
Uzbekistan	19	9	5	5	25	20	+5	5 June 2025
Vietnam	7	5	0	2	16	6	+10	15 June 2021
Yemen (Note: Includes matches against North Yemen.)	16	13	0	3	38	14	+24	24 September 2026
Total	495	216	123	156	791	584	+207	17 November 2026

=== CAF ===
Last updated at 12 December 2025

Positive Record Neutral Record Negative Record

Opponent	Pld	W	D	L	GF	GA	GD	Last Match
Algeria	8	2	3	3	6	6	0	12 December 2025
Angola	1	0	0	1	0	2	−2	12 October 2010
Benin	2	0	1	1	0	1	−1	17 November 2007
Egypt	10	1	4	5	7	11	−4	6 December 2025
Gabon	1	0	0	1	0	1	−1	25 March 2018
Gambia	1	0	1	0	1	1	0	29 May 2022
Kenya	1	0	1	0	2	2	0	21 December 2003
Libya	4	1	2	1	8	5	+3	2 December 2005
Mauritania	1	1	0	0	1	0	+1	3 December 2021
Mali	1	0	1	0	0	0	0	27 August 1997
Morocco	5	1	3	1	4	6	–2	15 December 2025
Niger	1	1	0	0	4	0	+4	29 November 2016
Senegal	4	1	2	1	7	8	−1	28 October 1994
South Africa	1	1	0	0	1	0	+1	15 December 1997
Sudan	2	2	0	0	6	2	+4	17 October 1998
Togo	2	1	0	1	3	5	−2	21 November 2007
Tunisia	5	0	0	5	2	10	−8	6 December 2021
Total	50	12	19	19	52	60	–8	15 December 2025

=== CONCACAF ===
Last updated at 13 November 2026

Positive Record Neutral Record Negative Record

Opponent	Pld	W	D	L	GF	GA	GD	Last Match
Costa Rica	1	1	0	0	4	1	+3	12 September 2023
Dominican Republic	1	1	0	0	4	0	+4	30 August 2019
Haiti	1	0	0	1	0	1	−1	10 November 2017
Honduras	4	1	2	1	4	3	+1	13 November 2026
Mexico	1	0	1	0	2	2	0	12 September 1985
Trinidad and Tobago	2	0	1	1	3	5	−2	6 September 2018
Total	10	3	4	3	17	12	+5	13 November 2026

=== CONMEBOL ===
Last updated at 16 November 2022

Positive Record Neutral Record Negative Record

Opponent	Pld	W	D	L	GF	GA	GD	Last Match
Argentina	1	0	0	1	0	5	−5	16 November 2022
Bolivia	1	0	1	0	0	0	0	16 November 2018
Brazil	1	0	0	1	0	8	−8	12 November 2005
Chile	1	0	0	1	0	2	−2	9 October 2010
Colombia	1	0	0	1	0	2	−2	9 June 1990
Paraguay	2	0	1	1	0	1	−1	23 September 2022
Peru	1	0	1	0	0	0	0	24 May 2005
Uruguay	1	0	0	1	0	2	−2	13 December 1997
Venezuela	2	0	0	2	0	6	−6	27 September 2022
Total	11	0	3	8	0	26	–26	16 November 2022

=== OFC ===
Last updated at 9 September 2013

Positive Record Neutral Record Negative Record

Opponent	Pld	W	D	L	GF	GA	GD	Last Match
New Zealand	2	2	0	0	3	0	+3	9 September 2013
Total	2	2	0	0	3	0	+3	9 September 2013

=== UEFA ===
Last updated at 19 November 2022

Positive Record Neutral Record Negative Record

Opponent	Pld	W	D	L	GF	GA	GD	Last Match
Andorra	1	0	1	0	0	0	0	18 August 2018
Armenia	1	0	0	1	3	4	−1	27 May 2014
Azerbaijan	1	0	1	0	3	3	0	14 December 2003
Belarus	2	1	0	1	3	3	0	22 November 2004
Bulgaria	6	1	0	5	4	14	−10	2 June 1996
Czech Republic	2	0	1	1	1	6	−5	15 November 2009
Denmark	1	0	1	0	1	1	0	5 February 1990
Estonia	2	1	1	0	4	3	+1	14 November 2012
Finland	1	0	1	0	1	1	0	12 February 1990
Georgia	1	1	0	0	1	0	+1	3 June 2014
Germany (Note: Includes matches against West Germany.)	3	0	0	3	3	14	−11	2 June 2009
Hungary	2	0	0	2	1	6	−5	14 August 1996
Iceland	3	1	0	2	2	3	−1	16 January 2016
Kazakhstan	4	3	0	1	11	6	+5	19 November 2022
Lithuania	1	0	1	0	1	1	0	3 September 2014
Malta	2	0	2	0	1	1	0	15 November 1996
Moldova	1	1	0	0	3	2	+1	29 May 2010
Norway	3	0	2	1	2	5	−3	27 August 2014
Poland	3	0	0	3	2	10	−8	6 December 2006
Romania	1	1	0	0	2	1	+1	18 September 1996
Russia	1	0	0	1	0	1	−1	29 May 1996
Serbia (Note: Includes matches against Yugoslavia.)	1	0	0	1	1	4	−3	19 June 1990
Slovakia	3	0	0	3	2	5	−3	22 March 2018
Slovenia	2	0	2	0	3	3	0	19 February 2000
Sweden	2	1	0	1	2	3	−1	17 February 1990
Switzerland	4	2	0	2	3	4	−1	9 February 2005
Ukraine	1	0	1	0	1	1	0	26 August 1994
Total	55	13	14	28	60	106	–46	19 November 2022

== Home matches ==
As of 17 November 2026

Stadium	City	Played	W	D	L	GF	GA	GD	Win %
Zayed Sports City	Abu Dhabi	37	19	9	9	62	37	+25	51.35%
MBZ Stadium	Abu Dhabi	32	19	7	6	72	32	+40	59.38%
Al Maktoum Stadium	Dubai	19	13	2	4	34	20	+14	68.42%
MBR Stadium	Dubai	17	7	7	3	26	20	+4	41.18%
Zabeel Stadium	Dubai	16	10	5	1	35	11	+24	62.5%
KBZ Stadium	Al Ain	15	12	1	2	38	11	+27	80%
Al Nahyan Stadium	Abu Dhabi	13	10	1	2	23	11	+11	76.92%
Sharjah Stadium	Sharjah	11	5	2	4	17	10	+7	45.45%
HBZ Stadium	Al Ain	8	4	2	2	11	8	+3	50%
Tahnoun Stadium	Al Ain	7	3	1	3	14	6	+8	42.86%
Rashid Stadium	Dubai	7	3	1	3	13	9	+4	42.86%
Al Awir Stadium	Al Awir	1	0	0	1	0	4	–4	0%
Total	5 Cities	181	103	38	40	339	177	+162	56.91%

== UAE in Competitive Tournaments ==
=== FIFA World Cup record ===
FIFA World Cup record
Year	Round	Position	Pld	W	D	L	GF	GA
(Uruguay) 1930	Part of the United Kingdom							
(Italy) 1934	Part of the United Kingdom							
(France) 1938	Part of the United Kingdom							
(Brazil) 1950	Part of the United Kingdom							
(Switzerland) 1954	Part of the United Kingdom							
(Sweden) 1958	Part of the United Kingdom							
(Chile) 1962	Part of the United Kingdom							
(England) 1966	Part of the United Kingdom							
(Mexico) 1970	Part of the United Kingdom							
(West Germany) 1974	Not eligible to enter							
(Argentina) 1978	Did not participate							
(Spain) 1982	Did not participate							
(Mexico) 1986	Did not qualify							
(Italy) 1990	Group stage	24th	3	0	0	3	2	11
(United States) 1994	Did not qualify							
(France) 1998	Did not qualify							
(South Korea) (Japan) 2002	Did not qualify							
(Germany) 2006	Did not qualify							
(South Africa) 2010	Did not qualify							
(Brazil) 2014	Did not qualify							
(Russia) 2018	Did not qualify							
(Qatar) 2022	Did not qualify							
(Canada) (Mexico) (United States) 2026	Did not qualify							
Total	Group stage	1/23	3	0	0	3	2	11

=== Matches ===
List of FIFA World Cup matches
1990	Group Stage	Colombia	0–2	Loss	0–0–1
1990	Group Stage	West Germany	1–5	Loss	0–0–2
1990	Group Stage	Yugoslavia	1–4	Loss	0–0–3

=== AFC Asian Cup record ===
AFC Asian Cup record
Year	Result	Position	GP	W	D	L	GF	GA
(Hong Kong) 1956	Did not enter							
(South Korea) 1960	Did not enter							
(Israel) 1964	Did not enter							
(Iran) 1968	Did not enter							
(Thailand) 1972	Did not enter							
(Iran) 1976	Did not enter							
(Kuwait) 1980	Group stage	9th	4	0	1	3	3	9
(Singapore) 1984	Group stage	6th	4	2	0	2	3	8
(Qatar) 1988	Group stage	8th	4	1	0	3	2	4
(Japan) 1992	Fourth place	4th	5	1	3	1	3	4
(United Arab Emirates) 1996	Runners-up	2nd	6	4	2	0	8	3
(Lebanon) 2000	Did not qualify							
(China) 2004	Group stage	15th	3	0	1	2	1	5
(Indonesia) (Malaysia) (Thailand) (Vietnam) 2007	Group stage	12th	3	1	0	2	3	6
(Qatar) 2011	Group stage	13th	3	0	1	2	0	4
(Australia) 2015	Third place	3rd	6	3	1	2	10	8
(United Arab Emirates) 2019	Semifinals	4th	6	3	2	1	8	8
(Qatar) 2023	Round of 16	10th	4	1	2	1	6	5
Total	Runners-up	11/18	48	16	13	19	46	61

=== Matches ===
List of AFC Asian Cup matches
1980	Group Stage	Kuwait	1–1	Draw	0–1–0
1980	Group Stage	Qatar	1–2	Loss	0–1–1
1980	Group Stage	Malaysia	0–2	Loss	0–1–2
1980	Group Stage	South Korea	1–4	Loss	0–1–3
1984
1984	Group Stage	Iran	0–3	Loss	0–1–4
1984	Group Stage	India	2–0	Win	1–1–4
1984	Group Stage	Singapore	1–0	Win	2–1–4
1984	Group Stage	China	0–5	Loss	2–1–5
1988
1988	Group Stage	South Korea	0–1	Loss	2–1–6
1988	Group Stage	Qatar	1–2	Loss	2–1–7
1988	Group Stage	Iran	0–1	Loss	2–1–8
1988	Group Stage	Japan	1–0	Win	3–1–8
1992
1992	Group Stage	Japan	0–0	Draw	3–2–8
1992	Group Stage	Iran	0–0	Draw	3–3–8
1992	Group Stage	North Korea	2–1	Win	4–3–8
1992	Semi-Final	Saudi Arabia	0–2	Loss	4–3–9
1992	Third Place play-off	China	1–1; 3–4 (pen.)	Draw	4–4–9
1996
1996	Group Stage	South Korea	1–1	Draw	4–5–9
1996	Group Stage	Kuwait	3–2	Win	5–5–9
1996	Group Stage	Indonesia	2–0	Win	6–5–9
1996	Quarter-Final	Iraq	1–0 (a.e.t.)	Win	7–5–9
1996	Semi-Final	Kuwait	1–0	Win	8–5–9
1996	Final	Saudi Arabia	0–0; 2–4 (pen.)	Draw	8–6–9
2004
2004	Group Stage	Kuwait	1–3	Loss	8–6–10
2004	Group Stage	South Korea	0–2	Loss	8–6–11
2004	Group Stage	Jordan	0–0	Draw	8–7–11
2007
2007	Group Stage	Vietnam	0–2	Loss	8–7–12
2007	Group Stage	Japan	1–3	Loss	8–7–13
2007	Group Stage	Qatar	2–1	Win	9–7–13
2011
2011	Group Stage	North Korea	0–0	Draw	9–8–13
2011	Group Stage	Iraq	0–1	Loss	9–8–14
2011	Group Stage	Iran	0–3	Loss	9–8–15
2015
2015	Group Stage	Qatar	4–1	Win	10–8–15
2015	Group Stage	Bahrain	2–1	Win	11–8–15
2015	Group Stage	Iran	0–1	Loss	11–8–16
2015	Quarter-Final	Japan	1–1; 5–4 (pen.)	Draw	11–9–16
2015	Semi-Final	Australia	0–2	Loss	11–9–17
2015	Third Place play-off	Iraq	3–2	Win	12–9–17
2019
2019	Group Stage	Bahrain	1–1	Draw	12–10–17
2019	Group Stage	India	2–0	Win	13–10–17
2019	Group Stage	Thailand	1–1	Draw	13–11–17
2019	Round of 16	Kyrgyzstan	3–2 (a.e.t.)	Win	14–11–17
2019	Quarter-Final	Australia	1–0	Win	15–11–17
2019	Semi-Final	Qatar	0–4	Loss	15–11–18
2023
2023	Group Stage	Hong Kong	3–1	Win	16–11–18
2023	Group Stage	Palestine	1–1	Draw	16–12–18
2023	Group Stage	Iran	1–2	Loss	16–12–19
2023	Round of 16	Tajikistan	1–1; 3–5 (pen.)	Draw	16–13–19

=== FIFA Confederations Cup record ===
FIFA Confederations Cup record
Year	Round	Position	Pld	W	D	L	GF	GA
(Saudi Arabia) 1992	Did not qualify							
(Saudi Arabia) 1995	Did not qualify							
(Saudi Arabia) 1997	Group stage	6th	3	1	0	2	2	8
(Mexico) 1999	Did not qualify							
(South Korea) (Japan) 2001	Did not qualify							
(France) 2003	Did not qualify							
(Germany) 2005	Did not qualify							
(South Africa) 2009	Did not qualify							
(Brazil) 2013	Did not qualify							
(Russia) 2017	Did not qualify							
Total	Group stage	1/10	3	1	0	2	2	8

=== Arabian Gulf Cup record ===
Arabian Gulf Cup record
Year	Place	Pld	W	D	L	GF	GA
(Bahrain) 1970	Did not enter						
(Saudi Arabia) 1972	Third place	3	1	0	2	1	11
(Kuwait) 1974	Fourth place	4	1	1	2	5	9
(Qatar) 1976	Fifth Place	6	0	2	4	4	13
(Iraq) 1979	Sixth place	6	1	0	5	5	18
(United Arab Emirates) 1982	Third place	5	3	0	2	7	6
(Oman) 1984	Fourth place	6	2	3	1	5	4
(Bahrain) 1986	Runners-up	6	3	2	1	10	7
(Saudi Arabia) 1988	Runners-up	6	3	2	1	7	4
(Kuwait) 1990	Fifth place	4	0	2	2	2	8
(Qatar) 1992	Fourth place	5	3	0	2	4	3
(United Arab Emirates) 1994	Runners-up	5	3	2	0	7	1
(Oman) 1996	Fourth place	5	1	3	1	5	5
(Bahrain) 1998	Third place	5	2	1	2	5	7
(Saudi Arabia) 2002	Sixth place	5	1	0	4	3	7
(Kuwait) 2003	Fifth place	6	2	1	3	6	7
(Qatar) 2004	Group Stage	3	0	2	1	4	5
(United Arab Emirates) 2007	Champions	5	4	0	1	8	1
(Oman) 2009	Group Stage	3	1	1	1	3	4
(Yemen) 2010	Semi-finals	5	1	2	1	3	2
(Bahrain) 2013	Champions	5	5	0	0	10	3
(Saudi Arabia) 2014	Third place	5	2	2	1	7	5
(Kuwait) 2017	Runners-up	5	1	4	0	1	0
(Qatar) 2019	Group Stage	3	1	0	2	5	6
(Iraq) 2023	Group Stage	3	0	1	2	2	4
(Kuwait) 2024–25	Group Stage	3	0	2	1	3	4
(Saudi Arabia) 2026	Runners-up	5	3	1	1	9	3
Total	Champions	122	44	32	43	131	146
