= Football in Qatar =

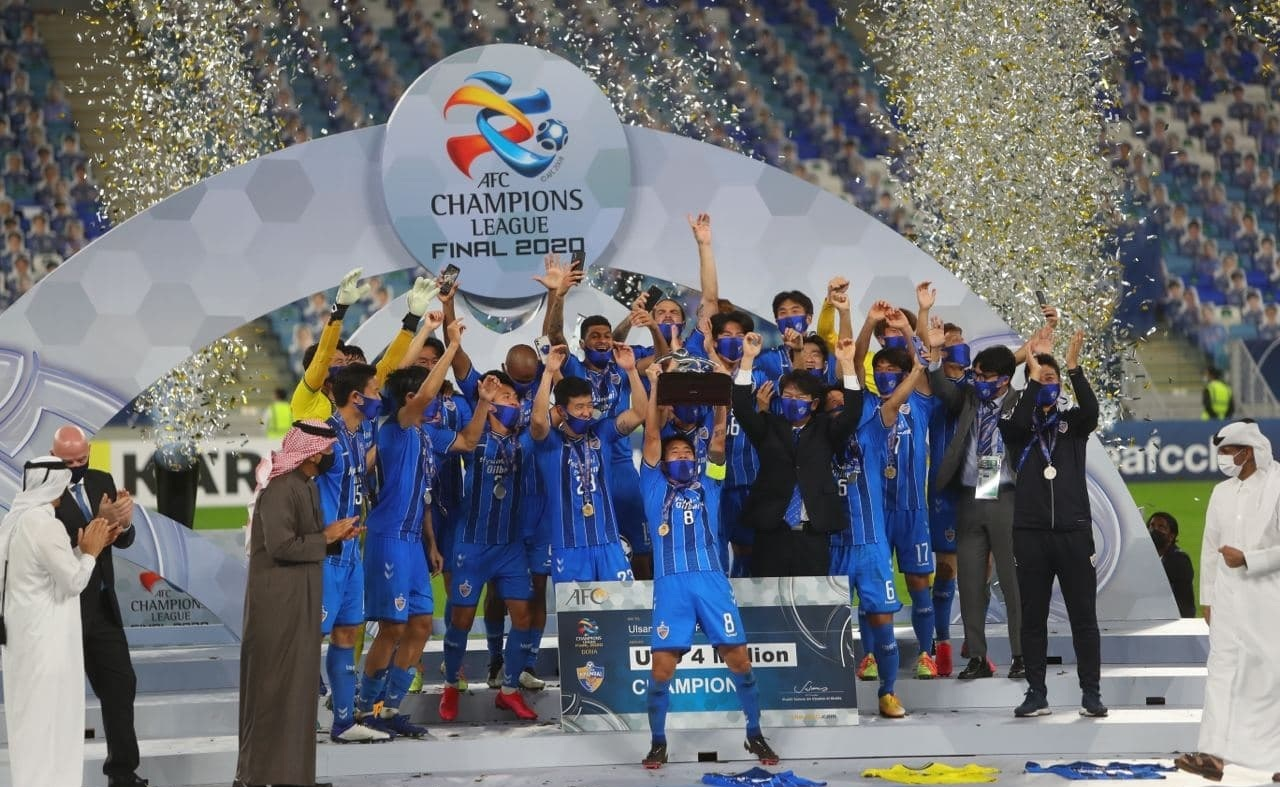
- Al Janoub Stadium hosted the 2020 AFC Champions League final. Part of Qatar's plan to demonstrate its ability to host international football matches.
- Country: Qatar
- Governing body: Qatar Football Association (QFA)
- National team: Qatar
- First played: 1940s
- Clubs: 20

National competitions
- FIFA World Cup; AFC Asian Cup; AFC Champions League Elite; AFC Champions League Two; AGCFF Gulf Club Champions League; Arab Club Champions Cup

Club competitions
- List: League: Qatar Stars League Qatari Second Division; Cups: Qatar Cup Qatar FA Cup QSL Cup Amir of Qatar Cup Sheikh Jassim Cup

International competitions
- FIFA Club World Cup; FIFA Intercontinental Cup

Football is the most popular sport in Qatar. Almost half of the people in Qatar are interested in football Football in Qatar is organized by the Qatar Football Association (QFA).

Qatar has hosted the 2011 AFC Asian Cup, 2021 FIFA Arab Cup, 2022 FIFA World Cup, 2023 AFC Asian Cup, and the 2024 AFC U-23 Asian Cup.

== History ==
=== Origins (1940s–1950s) ===
Football was introduced to the country in the 1940s when oil workers from India and northern Arab states organized a match among themselves. The first documented teams in Qatar was a team formed for the Northern Arab Region, and also a team formed the near the Al-Khatia area of Dukhan.

The "Hazel Dayne Cup" was the inaugural competition in the area, teams including Al-Najah, Al-Shorta, Al-Tahrir, and Al-Maaref took part in the tournament. A subsequent competition was the "Izz al-Din Championship" organised by 1951 which was founded by the Qatar Oil Company. Eventually, the name was changed to the "Pukett Cup" in the late 1950s.

The first football club formed in the Qatari region was Al-Shorta in 1938. While Al-Najah (now known as Al-Ahli) followed, becoming the first professional club in the region, being established in 1950. It was established by the founders of another club, which was called "Sawt al-Arab", clubs were eventually formed afterwards which would go on to participate in the Qatari League.

In 1957, the Qatari youth squad won the Al-Qusaibi Cup for the first time, defeating the Saudi Al-Ettifaq club, the league winners at the time, by 3–2. This was the first trophy won outside of Qatar's boundaries. The Qatari Al-Nasr team also played a friendly match against the Al-Ittihad, winning 2–0 and received a massive silver-plated trophy which was built in Pakistan specifically for the occasion. Football went from Dukhan to the neighbourhoods of Qatar's capital, Doha, near the conclusion of this century and the beginning of the 1960s, when the official foundation of clubs began.

=== Early years (1960s–1970s) ===
The "QFA" also known as the "Qatar Football Association" was formed in 1960. And in 1963 The federation joined FIFA. Eventually also joining the AFC in 1967. With growing interest among youth and communities in the region, eventually a league was formed. The league came to be known as the "Qatari League" was formed in 1960 and the first league season was launched in 1963–64. League matches were held at the Doha Stadium, it was not until the 1972–73 season where the league officially started.

League titles in the 1960s were dominated by clubs like Al-Maaref, Al-Oruba, Al Sadd, etc. The Doha Stadium held and accommodated the first grass football pitch in the gulf region. Alongside several youth events which Qatari footballers like Badr Bilal, Ibrahim Khalfan, Khalid Salman, Mansour Muftah, participated in.

It also saw the formation of the first Qatari school team, which participated in the 1963 Arab School Games held in Kuwait.

The 1960s also saw numerous teams come to play in Qatar, such as Ismaily SC, Taj FC, Al-Riffa, Al-Muharraq, etc.

In 1960, the first committee responsible for organizing sports activities in Qatar was established under the name Qatar Sports Federation for Sports Games. It was chaired by Sheikh Suhaim bin Hamad Al Thani, with Hitmi Al Hitmi, Majid bin Saad Al Saad, and Abdullah bin Khalifa Al Mutawa serving as members. The committee's work was short-lived and came to an end following the resignation of its members.

In 1962, the committee was reconstituted under the chairmanship of Sheikh Jassim bin Hamad Al Thani. Hitmi Hamad Al Hitmi was appointed Vice Chairman, Mohammed bin Ali Al Ansari served as Secretary, and Majid bin Saad Al Saad and Mohammed Salah Morsi, the latter representing the Ministry of Education served as members. The committee also appointed Professor Fawzi Al-Dali, a Syrian educator, as a consultant to assist in drafting regulations for local competitions.

A permanent headquarters was established for the committee in two ministry-owned villas located near Doha Stadium. The headquarters was furnished and supplied with official documentation, while regulations and administrative programs were developed to organize football activities. During this period, the committee laid down the fundamental rules of football in Qatar and defined its organizational objectives. It regularly consulted with sports and cultural clubs, offered technical guidance, organized local tournaments, and drafted regulations governing clubs and competitions. The committee also organized the first national football league for clubs, utilizing the facilities of Al-Maaref Club.

In 1963, the committee was formed for the third time following an increase in the number of sports clubs in Doha and other regions, which made it necessary to reorganize sports activities in the country.

=== Emergence (1970s–1990s) ===
The Qatar national football team was formed and debuted in the 1970 Gulf Cup. In the tournament, the team faced disappointing results, they drew with Saudi Arabia 1–1 and lost against Kuwait and Bahrain. The first player to score the national team's first goal was Mubarak Faraj against Bahrain in their opening match in the tournament.

In 1973, a Pelé-led Santos would come to Qatar playing a match against Al-Ahli with the visitors winning by 3–0, the Santos side included the legendary Pelé alongside players such as Carlos Alberto, Edu, Clodoaldo.

The national team would go on to participate in several editions of the Arabian Gulf Cup. Notable in the 1976 edition hosted in Qatar, the national team would win four of the six matches that they played, winning against Saudi in their opening match thanks to a goal by Sulaiman Almas, they then lost to Kuwait by four goals and also drew with Iraq, they won their matches against United Arab Emirates, Oman, Bahrain by three or more goals.

In 1978, the Qatar national football team made its debut at the Asian Games, held in Bangkok, Thailand.

In 1979, the Supreme Council for Youth Welfare was established under the chairmanship of His Highness Sheikh Hamad bin Khalifa Al Thani, the then-Crown Prince. Shortly thereafter, the Qatar National Olympic Committee was formed, chaired by His Highness Sheikh Abdullah bin Khalifa Al Thani.

In the same year, the Qatar Football Association was reconstituted under the leadership of Mr. Sultan bin Khalid Al-Suwaidi, marking the beginning of a new era of growth and development for Qatari football, with enhanced focus on national teams, competitions and youth-age development.

In the 1970s, the Qatari League was won by Al Sadd, Al-Esteghlal and Al Rayyan, with the addition of the Emir Cup in 1972. Alongside the Sheikh Jassim Cup which was formed in 1977. The level of competition in Qatar increased with more priority on developing youth and improving health and fitness of professional footballers.

Qatar's Youth Investment paid off in the 1981 FIFA World Youth Cup, where the youth team would finish as runners-up behind West Germany. In the group stage, they beat Poland by a goal, tied with the United States 1–1, and lost to Uruguay by a goal.

Advancing out their group, In the quarter-finals they beat Brazil 3–2 with a hat-trick from Khalid Salman and also England in the semi-finals by 2–1 with Badr Bilal and Ali Alsada scoring, reaching the final but falling to West Germany by four goals.

The Qatar football team competed in the AFC Asian Cup for the first time in 1980 AFC Asian Cup, which was hosted in Kuwait. The first team also advanced to the final of the 1984 Gulf Cup in Muscat, Oman. Where they lost to Iraq finishing in a runners-up position. The team also qualified for the 1984 AFC Asian Cup but failed to make it out of the group stage. The 1988 AFC Asian Cup was hosted by Qatar yet the national team still could not make it out the group stage but had gotten a remarkable 3–0 over Japan in their last group stage match.

In 1984, Qatar qualified for the 1984 Summer Olympics held in Los Angeles. In the qualifiers, Qatar had to win against Syria to qualify for the competition, while Syria only needed a draw or a win to advance to the final tournament. Qatar's striker Mansour Muftah scored the winning goal at the 58th minute to enable Qatar to participate in the tournament.

The team also played the 1986, 1988, 1990 editions of the Gulf Cup, reaching second-place at the 1990 Gulf Cup, before winning the competition for the first time in 1992.

In the 1980s, the Qatari League would develop rapidly with Al-Arabi, Al Sadd, and Al-Rayyan dominating the league throughout the 1980s. This era witnessed players such as Hassan Mattar, Adel Khamis, Mahmoud Soufi, etc. There had been a second division for a while, but no system of promotion or relegation existed. But the first time such a system was implemented was in 1981. That year, five clubs competed in the second tier.

In 1986, since the Qatar national team was training for the 1986 FIFA World Cup qualification stages, there was neither relegation nor promotion in 1984–85 due to a shortage of players.

The 1990s saw a fast-paced era of Qatari football, the league was dominated by Al-Arabi winning the league five times out of ten league seasons, with Mubarak Mustafa being an influential player in the team's success throughout the decade winning the top goal-scorer award three times. For a single season in 1994, the QFA instituted a new system in which games that ended in draws were decided by a penalty shootout. This was implemented in an attempt to increase attendance at league games.

Meanwhile, the Qatar national team would win their first ever Gulf Cup title in 1992. Qatar would win five of the six games they played in the tournament only losing to Saudi Arabia in their final match. The side also participated in the 1992 Summer Olympics, where they were coached by Evaristo de Macedo. Qatar were placed in Group B along with Spain, Egypt, and Colombia, miraculously advancing with a second-place finish in the group stage. Although this would be an impressive achievement for the team they would eventually lose to Poland by two goals at the Camp Nou.

The following year, Qatar was ranked 53rd place in the FIFA rankings.

In 1998, Qatar would reach the second round of the 1998 World Cup qualifiers finishing 4th place with three wins, 1 draw, and 4 loses. The same year they would also host the 1998 Arab Cup and would finish as runners-up losing to Saudi Arabia in the final.

== Spectatorship ==
In a 2014 survey conducted by Qatari government ministries and departments, 65% of the 1,079 respondents indicated that they did not attend a football match in the previous league season. Lack of time, unsuitable atmospheres for females and the presence of paid fans were all major factors for not attending. The highest deterrent was climate, which was cited by seventy-three percent respondents as impacting their decision to attend a football match.

As an initiative to gauge public opinion and increase local participation in sports with an emphasis on football, the Supreme Committee for Delivery & Legacy (SC) launched the Jeeran program in April 2015. The program involves seeking the opinion and advice of people in majlises, as well as encouraging large-scale community involvement, particularly by women.

== Most successful teams ==
Team	Total number of trophies	Qatar Stars League winners	Emir Cup winners	Qatar Cup winners	Sheikh Jassem Cup winners	Qatari Stars Cup winners	Qatar FA Cup winners
Al-Sadd	59	16 (1972, 1974, 1979, 1980, 1981, 1987, 1988, 1989, 2000, 2004, 2006, 2007, 2013, 2019, 2021, 2022)	18 (1975, 1977, 1982, 1985, 1986, 1988, 1991, 1994, 2000, 2001, 2003, 2005, 2007, 2014, 2015, 2017, 2020, 2021)	8 (1998, 2003, 2006, 2007, 2008, 2017, 2020, 2021)	15 (1977, 1978, 1979, 1981, 1985, 1986, 1988, 1990, 1997, 1999, 2001, 2006, 2014, 2017, 2019)	2 (2010, 2020)	
Qatar SC	24	8 (1967, 1968, 1969, 1970, 1971, 1973, 1977, 2003)	8 (1967, 1968, 1969, 1970, 1971, 1972, 1974, 1976)	3 (2002, 2004, 2009)	4 (1983, 1984, 1987, 1995)	1 (2014)	
Al-Rayyan	23	8 (1976, 1978, 1982, 1984, 1986, 1990, 1995, 2016)	6 (1999, 2004, 2006, 2010, 2011, 2013)	4 (1995, 1996, 2001, 2012)	5 (1992, 2000, 2012, 2013, 2018)		
Al-Arabi	24	7 (1983, 1985, 1991, 1993, 1994, 1996, 1997)	9 (1978, 1979, 1980, 1983, 1984, 1989, 1990, 1993, 2023)	1 (1997)	6 (1980, 1982, 1994, 2008, 2010, 2011)		1 (2022)
Al-Gharafa	23	7 (1992, 1998, 2002, 2005, 2008, 2009, 2010)	8 (1995, 1996, 1997, 1998, 2002, 2009, 2012, 2025)	3 (2000, 2010, 2011)	2 (2005, 2007)	3 (2009, 2018, 2019)	
Al-Duhail	19	8 (2011, 2012, 2014, 2015, 2017, 2018, 2020, 2023)	4 (2016, 2018, 2019, 2022)	4 (2013, 2015, 2018, 2023)	2 (2015, 2016)	1 (2023)	
Al-Wakrah	8	2 (1999, 2001)		1 (1999)	4 (1989, 1991, 1998, 2004)	1 (2012)	
Al-Ahli (Doha)	4		4 (1973, 1981, 1987, 1992)				
Al-Maref	3	3 (1964, 1965, 1966)					
El-Jaish	3			2 (2014, 2016)		1 (2013)	
Al-Khor	2			1 (2005)	1 (2002)		
Umm-Salal	2		1 (2008)		1 (2009)		
Al-Sailiya	2					1 (2021)	1 (2021)
Al-Muaither	1				1 (2003)		
Al-Shamal	1				1 (1996)		

== Stadiums ==
=== Capacity ===
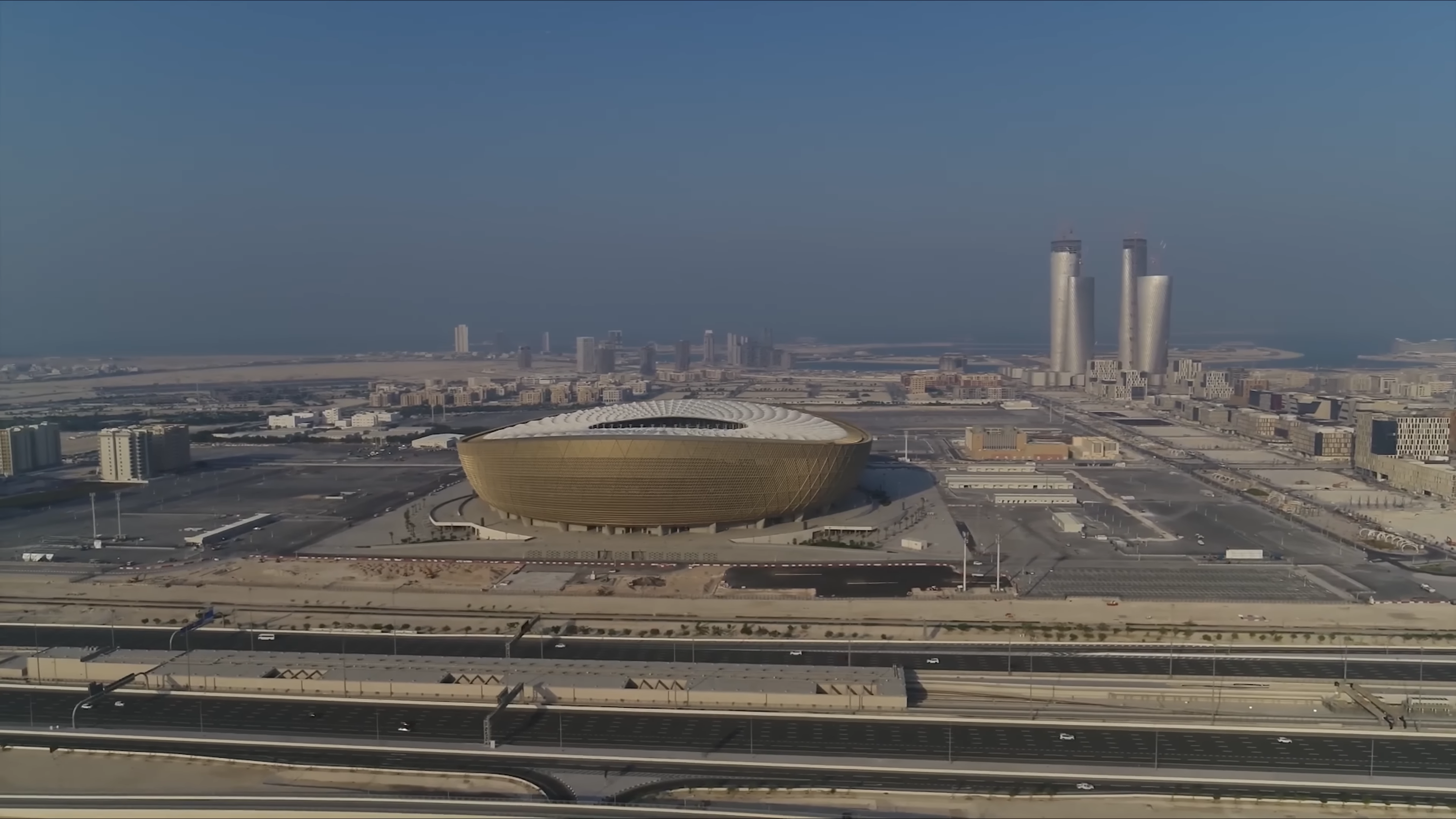
Aerial view of the Lusail Stadium during daytime

Lusail Stadium is the largest stadium in Qatar, with a capacity of 88,966. The stadium was used to host matches for the 2022 FIFA World Cup and also was used for the 2022 FIFA World Cup final between Argentina and France. It has also hosted several other tournaments such as 2023 AFC Asian Cup, 2024 FIFA Intercontinental Cup final. The second largest stadium in Qatar is the Al Bayt Stadium located in Al Khor with a capacity seating of 68,895. The stadium was used for the 2022 FIFA World Cup and the 2023 AFC Asian Cup. In Al Rayyan, Khalifa International Stadium holds about 45,857 seats and is mostly used as a venue for the Qatar national team for matches, alongside other stadiums in the same area such as Ahmad bin Ali Stadium and Education City Stadium with both having around 45,000 seats.

=== Other stadiums in Qatar ===
Other stadiums such as the Al Thumama Stadium, Al Janoub Stadium located in Al Wakrah region, Stadium 974, etc.

Have all been used for either the 2022 FIFA World Cup or the 2023 AFC Asian Cup, stadiums in Qatar are still being used to host events and Qatar Stars League matches are also played at these stadiums.

=== Largest Qatari football stadiums by capacity ===
Stadium	City	Capacity	Team	Year built	Notes	Image
Lusail Stadium	Lusail	88,966		2021	Used for the 2022 FIFA World Cup, 2023 AFC Asian Cup	
Al Bayt Stadium	Al Khor	68,895		2021	Used for the 2022 FIFA World Cup, 2023 AFC Asian Cup	
Khalifa International Stadium	Al Rayyan	45,857	Qatar national football team	2017 (Note: Originally built in 1976; reconstructed in 2017)	Used for the 2022 FIFA World Cup, 2011 AFC Asian Cup and 2023 AFC Asian Cup	
Ahmad bin Ali Stadium	Al Rayyan	45,032	Al-Rayyan SC	2020	Used for the 2022 FIFA World Cup and 2023 AFC Asian Cup	
Education City Stadium	Al Rayyan	44,667		2020	Used for the 2022 FIFA World Cup, 2023 AFC Asian Cup	
Al Thumama Stadium	Doha	44,400		2021	Used for the 2022 FIFA World Cup, 2023 AFC Asian Cup	
Al Janoub Stadium	Al Wakrah	44,325		2019	Used for the 2022 FIFA World Cup, 2023 AFC Asian Cup	
Stadium 974	Doha	44,089		2021	Used for the 2022 FIFA World Cup	
Thani bin Jassim Stadium	Al Rayyan	21,872	Al-Gharafa; Umm Salal	2003	Use for the 2011 AFC Asian Cup	
Jassim bin Hamad Stadium	Al Rayyan	13,030	Al-Sadd	2004 (Note: Originally built in 1975; reconstructed in 2004)	Use for the 2011 AFC Asian Cup and 2023 AFC Asian Cup	
Hamad bin Khalifa Stadium	Doha	12,000	Al Ahli	1986		
Grand Hamad Stadium	Doha	12,000	Al-Arabi	1986		
Suheim bin Hamad Stadium	Doha	12,000	Qatar SC	1986; 2003	Use for the 2011 AFC Asian Cup	
Al-Khor SC Stadium	Al Khor	12,000	Al-Kharaitiyat; Al Khor	2011		
Saoud bin Abdulrahman Stadium	Al Wakrah	12,000	Al-Wakrah SC	2003		
Qatar University Stadium	Doha	10,000				
Abdullah bin Khalifa Stadium	Doha	10,000	Al-Duhail SC	2013	Used for the 2023 AFC Asian Cup	
Al-Shamal SC Stadium	Madinat ash Shamal	5,000	Al-Shamal	2011		
Doha Sports Stadium	Doha	2,000		1962		
Al-Sailiya Stadium	Doha	1,074	Al-Sailiya	2012		

== National team ==
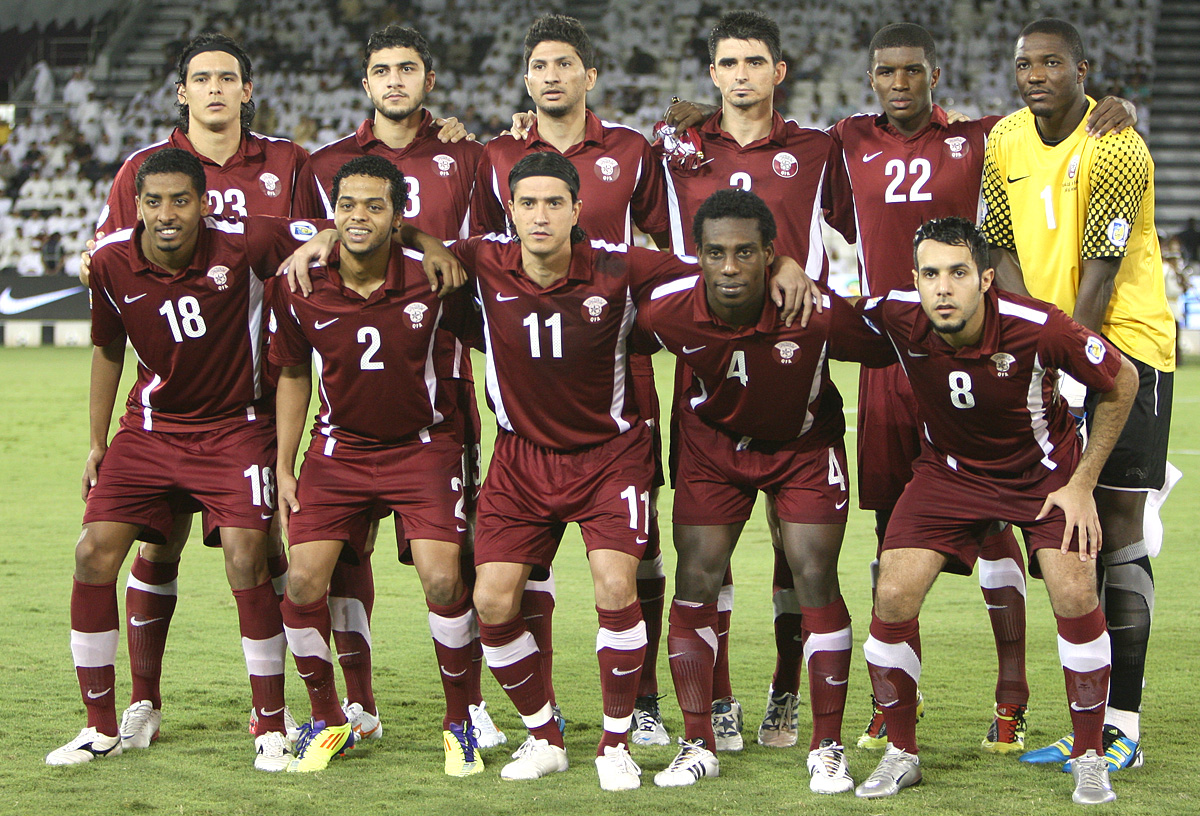
Qatar national football team in 2011.

The Qatar national team has had limited international success and has often been accused of abusing naturalisation laws to acquire players. However, they did win the Arabian Gulf Cup three times and won back-to-back AFC Asian Cup titles in 2019 and 2023. The side also participated in the 2022 FIFA World Cup as hosts.

== FIFA World Cup ==
In 2010, Qatar won the bid to host the 2022 FIFA World Cup, becoming the first Arab country to host the tournament. Following a controversy over bidding, a report by FIFA cleared Qatar's name from all allegations.

In June 2019, the FIFA Council announced Qatar as the host of 2019 FIFA Club World Cup and 2020 FIFA Club World Cup.

On 11 August 2022, FIFA officially moved up the opening match of the World Cup by one day to 20 November, in an unusual change for hosts Qatar to appear in the gala game.

At the 2022 tournament, Qatar became to date the only host to lose their opening game, the first to be eliminated after two matches, and the first to lose all three games.

== Attendances ==
The average attendance per top-flight football league season and the club with the highest average attendance:

Season	League average	Best club	Best club average
2022-23	667	Al-Gharafa SC	1,147

Source: League page on Wikipedia

== See also ==
- Qatar Football Association
- Qatar football league system
- Qatari clubs in the AFC Champions League
- List of football stadiums in Qatar
