= 23rd Arabian Gulf Cup =

International football tournament in 2017–18

Tournament details
- Host country: Kuwait
- Dates: 22 December 2017 – 5 January 2018
- Teams: 8 (from 1 confederation)
- Venues: 2 (in 1 host city)

Final positions
- Champions: Oman (2nd title)
- Runners-up: United Arab Emirates

Tournament statistics
- Matches played: 15
- Goals scored: 23 (1.53 per match)
- Top scorer(s): (Bahrain) Jamal Rashid (Qatar) Almoez Ali (Iraq) Ali Husni (Iraq) Ali Faez (Oman) Said Al-Ruzaiqi (2 goals each)
- Best player: (Oman) Ahmed Kano
- Best goalkeeper: (United Arab Emirates) Khalid Eisa
- Fair play award: Kuwait

The 23rd Arabian Gulf Cup (Arabic: كأس الخليج العربي) was the 23rd edition of the biennial football competition for the eight members of the Arab Gulf Cup Football Federation. It took place in Kuwait from 22 December 2017 until 5 January 2018. Oman won their second title, defeating the United Arab Emirates in the final on penalties following a goalless draw.

This tournament saw the fewest goals-per-game average (1.53) in the history of Arabian Gulf Cup tournaments.

== Hosting ==
The Gulf Cup tournament was originally scheduled to be in 2016. It was delayed to 2017 after Kuwait was suspended by FIFA, and the tournament was moved to Qatar.

The tournament was originally scheduled to be held in Basra, Iraq, with an official decision set to be made in February 2015. On 2 February 2015, the Iraqi Ministry of Youth announced that Iraq would not host the competition due to a financial crisis in Iraq, but hoped to host the next edition in 2018. It would have been the second time that Iraq had hosted this competition after 1979 which was held in the capital Baghdad. Iraq was set to organize the two previous editions in 2013 and 2014, but the tournament shifted each time, after concerns over preparations and security. Instead, it was moved to Kuwait to be the hosts for the fourth time, after the editions of 1974, 1990 and 2003.

On 3 July 2015, it was announced that the awarding of hosting rights to Kuwait was postponed after reviewing the technical reports, and that a further announcement would be made later that month. The dates of the competition were also slightly changed to take place from 22 December 2015 to 4 January 2016. Again, on 3 August 2015, the dates of the championship were pushed back to December 2016 or January 2017 due to infrastructure problems in Kuwait, but Kuwait would remain the hosts of the competition. This again was changed in late August, when Kuwait announced that they would host as initially agreed in December 2015, that was after most domestic leagues in the region had re-arranged their calendars due to the earlier postponement.

On 19 October 2015, Kuwait withdrew from hosting following Kuwait Football Association's suspension from FIFA. Kuwait were to be once again re-instated as hosts on 27 April 2016, if their suspension by FIFA was lifted by May 2016, failing this, the tournament would be hosted by Qatar in December 2017. The suspension was not lifted at the 66th FIFA Congress and therefore, as decided from the earlier announcement on 27 April, the tournament would be moved to Qatar to be played in December 2017.

Concerns were later raised on Qatar's hosting of the event due to the Qatar diplomatic crisis, although no official announcement has been made by 11 September 2017. In November 2017, Saudi Arabia, the United Arab Emirates, and Bahrain pulled out of the Gulf Cup. On 6 December 2017, after Kuwait's adoption of a new sports law, Kuwait FA's FIFA suspension was lifted. On 7 December 2017, it was announced that Kuwait will again host the tournament after Saudi Arabia, the UAE, and Bahrain threatened to withdraw because of the said diplomatic crisis.

== Teams ==
| Team | Finals appearance | Previous best performance | FIFA Rankings |
| Team | Finals appearance | Previous best performance | December 2017 |
|---|---|---|---|
| Qatar | 23rd | Winners (1992, 2004, 2014) | 102 |
| Saudi Arabia | 22nd | Winners (1994, 2002, 2003–04) | 63 |
| Bahrain | 23rd | Runners-up (1970, 1982, 1992, 2003–04) | 115 |
| Oman | 21st | Winners (2009) | 101 |
| Iraq | 14th | Winners (1979, 1984, 1988) | 79 |
| United Arab Emirates | 22nd | Winners (2007, 2013) | 73 |
| Yemen | 8th | Group stage (2003–04, 2004, 2007, 2009, 2010, 2013) | 121 |
| Kuwait | 23rd | Winners (1970, 1972, 1974*, 1976, 1982, 1986, 1990*, 1996, 1998, 2010) | 189 |

== Venues ==
Kuwait City
| Ardhiya | Kaifan |
|---|---|
| Jaber Al-Ahmad International Stadium | Kuwait SC Stadium |
| Capacity: 60,000 | Capacity: 18,500 |

== Group stage ==
All times are local (UTC+03:00).

=== Group A ===
| Team | Pld | W | D | L | GF | GA | GD | Pts |
|---|---|---|---|---|---|---|---|---|
| Oman | 3 | 2 | 0 | 1 | 3 | 1 | +2 | 6 |
| United Arab Emirates | 3 | 1 | 2 | 0 | 1 | 0 | +1 | 5 |
| Saudi Arabia | 3 | 1 | 1 | 1 | 2 | 3 | −1 | 4 |
| Kuwait | 3 | 0 | 1 | 2 | 1 | 3 | −2 | 1 |

22 December 2017
18:30

| Kuwait | 1–2 | Saudi Arabia |
|---|---|---|
| Al Buraiki 60' | Report | Al-Moasher 13'; Fallatah 52' |

Jaber International Stadium, Kuwait City
Attendance: 60,000
Referee: Ali Abdulnabi (Bahrain)
22 December 2017
21:00

| United Arab Emirates | 1–0 | Oman |
|---|---|---|
| Mabkhout 28' (pen.) | Report |

Jaber International Stadium, Kuwait City
Referee: Ali Sabah (Iraq)

25 December 2017
17:30

| United Arab Emirates | 0–0 | Saudi Arabia |
|---|---|---|
| | Report |

Jaber International Stadium, Kuwait City
Attendance: 47,556
Referee: Aziz Asimov (Uzbekistan)
25 December 2017
20:00

| Kuwait | 0–1 | Oman |
|---|---|---|
| | Report | Kano 58' (pen.) |

Jaber International Stadium, Kuwait City
Referee: Saoud Al-Athbah (Qatar)

28 December 2017
18:30

| Oman | 2–0 | Saudi Arabia |
|---|---|---|
| Al-Ruzaiqi 58', 77' | Report |

Al Kuwait Sports Club Stadium, Kuwait City
Referee: Hettikamkanamge Perera (Sri Lanka)
28 December 2017
18:30

| Kuwait | 0–0 | United Arab Emirates |
|---|---|---|
| | Report |

Jaber International Stadium, Kuwait City
Referee: Ali Sabah (Iraq)

=== Group B ===
| Team | Pld | W | D | L | GF | GA | GD | Pts |
|---|---|---|---|---|---|---|---|---|
| Iraq | 3 | 2 | 1 | 0 | 6 | 2 | +4 | 7 |
| Bahrain | 3 | 1 | 2 | 0 | 3 | 2 | +1 | 5 |
| Qatar | 3 | 1 | 1 | 1 | 6 | 3 | +3 | 4 |
| Yemen | 3 | 0 | 0 | 3 | 0 | 8 | −8 | 0 |

23 December 2017
17:30

| Qatar | 4–0 | Yemen |
|---|---|---|
| Afif 2'; Al-Mahdi 5'; Ali 18'; Miguel 84' | Report |

Al Kuwait Sports Club Stadium, Kuwait City
Referee: Omar Al-Yaqoubi (Oman)
23 December 2017
20:00

| Bahrain | 1–1 | Iraq |
|---|---|---|
| Rashid 79' | Report | Abdul-Raheem 89' |

Al Kuwait Sports Club Stadium, Kuwait City
Referee: Ammar Al-Jeneibi (United Arab Emirates)

26 December 2017
17:30

| Yemen | 0–1 | Bahrain |
|---|---|---|
| | Report | Rashid 39' (pen.) |

Al Kuwait Sports Club Stadium, Kuwait City
Referee: Sultan Al-Harbi (Saudi Arabia)
26 December 2017
20:00

| Iraq | 2–1 | Qatar |
|---|---|---|
| Faez 45+1'; Husni 65' | Report | Ali 17' |

Al Kuwait Sports Club Stadium, Kuwait City
Referee: Ali Shaban (Kuwait)

29 December 2017
18:30

| Qatar | 1–1 | Bahrain |
|---|---|---|
| Al-Haydos 45+5' (pen.) | Report | Madan 57' |

Jaber International Stadium, Kuwait City
Referee: Aziz Asimov (Uzbekistan)
29 December 2017
18:30

| Iraq | 3–0 | Yemen |
|---|---|---|
| Husni 54'; Faez 64' (pen.); Kamil 80' | Report |

Al Kuwait Sports Club Stadium, Kuwait City
Referee: Ammar Al-Jeneibi (United Arab Emirates)

== Knockout stage ==
All times are local (UTC+03:00).

Semi-finals
2 January – Kuwait City
Iraq | 0 (2)
United Arab Emirates (p) | 0 (4)
2 January – Kuwait City
Oman | 1
Bahrain | 0

Final
5 January – Kuwait City
United Arab Emirates | 0 (4)
Oman (p) | 0 (5)

=== Semi-finals ===
2 January 2018
17:15

| Oman | 1–0 | Bahrain |
|---|---|---|
| Abduljabbar 29' (o.g.) | Report |

Jaber International Stadium, Kuwait City
Referee: Hettikamkanamge Perera (Sri Lanka)

2 January 2018
20:30

| Iraq | 0–0 (a.e.t.) | United Arab Emirates |
|---|---|---|
| | Report |
Penalties
| Abdul-Zahra (penalty missed); Abdul-Amir (penalty scored); Tariq (penalty missed); Attwan (penalty scored) | 2–4 | (penalty scored) Mabkhout; (penalty scored) Abdulrahman; (penalty scored) Esmaeel; (penalty scored) Barqesh |

Jaber International Stadium, Kuwait City
Referee: Aziz Asimov (Uzbekistan)

=== Final ===
5 January 2018
17:30

| United Arab Emirates | 0–0 (a.e.t.) | Oman |
|---|---|---|
| | Report |
Penalties
| Mabkhout (penalty scored); Barman (penalty scored); Ismail (penalty scored); Barqesh (penalty scored); Abdulrahman (penalty missed) | 4–5 | (penalty scored) Al-Muqbali; (penalty scored) Al-Mukhaini; (penalty scored) Kano; (penalty scored) Al-Ruzaiqi; (penalty scored) Al-Khaldi |

Jaber International Stadium, Kuwait City
Referee: Ali Shaban (Kuwait)

== Winner ==
23rd Arabian Gulf Cup Winner

Oman
Second title

== Goalscorers ==
2 goals

- (Bahrain) Jamal Rashid
- (Iraq) Ali Faez
- (Iraq) Ali Husni
- (Oman) Said Al-Ruzaiqi
- (Qatar) Almoez Ali

1 goal

- (Bahrain) Ali Madan
- (Iraq) Mahdi Kamil
- (Iraq) Mohannad Abdul-Raheem
- (Saudi Arabia) Mukhtar Fallatah
- (Saudi Arabia) Salman Al-Moasher
- (Kuwait) Abdullah Al Buraiki
- (Oman) Ahmed Kano
- (Qatar) Akram Afif
- (Qatar) Hassan Al-Haydos
- (Qatar) Al-Mahdi Ali Mukhtar
- (Qatar) Pedro Miguel
- (United Arab Emirates) Ali Mabkhout

1 own goal

- (Bahrain) Mahdi Abduljabbar (against Oman)

== Awards ==
The following awards were given:

| Award | Player |
|---|---|
| Fair Play Award | Kuwait |
| Most Valuable Player | (Oman) Ahmed Kano |
| Best Goalkeeper | (United Arab Emirates) Khalid Eisa |

== Team statistics ==
This table shows all team performance.

Final phase
| Pos | Team | Pld | W | D | L | GF | GA | GD | Pts |
|---|---|---|---|---|---|---|---|---|---|
| 1 | Oman | 5 | 3 | 1 | 1 | 4 | 1 | +3 | 10 |
| 2 | United Arab Emirates | 5 | 1 | 4 | 0 | 1 | 0 | +1 | 7 |
| 3 | Iraq | 4 | 2 | 2 | 0 | 6 | 2 | +4 | 8 |
| 4 | Bahrain | 4 | 1 | 2 | 1 | 3 | 3 | 0 | 5 |

Eliminated in the group stage
| Pos | Team | Pld | W | D | L | GF | GA | GD | Pts |
|---|---|---|---|---|---|---|---|---|---|
| 5 | Qatar | 3 | 1 | 1 | 1 | 6 | 3 | +3 | 4 |
| 6 | Saudi Arabia | 3 | 1 | 1 | 1 | 2 | 3 | −1 | 4 |
| 7 | Kuwait | 3 | 0 | 1 | 2 | 1 | 3 | −2 | 1 |
| 8 | Yemen | 3 | 0 | 0 | 3 | 0 | 8 | −8 | 0 |

== Media ==
=== Broadcasting ===
| Territory | Channel |
|---|---|
| Bahrain | Bahrain Sport |
| Iraq | Al-Iraqiya Sport |
| Kuwait | KTV Sport |
| Oman | Oman TV Sport |
| Qatar | Al Kass Sports Channels |
| Saudi Arabia | Al Riyadiah |
| Saudi Arabia | MBC Pro Sports |
| United Arab Emirates | ADTV Sport |
| United Arab Emirates | Dubai Sports |
