= 1998 Arab Cup final =

- Khalifa Int. Stadium hosted the final
- Event: 1998 Arab Cup
| Saudi Arabia | Qatar |
| (Saudi Arabia) | (Qatar) |
| 3 | 1 |
- Date: 1 October 1998
- Venue: Khalifa International Stadium, Doha
- Referee: Hicham Kirat (Tunisia)

The 1998 Arab Cup final was a football match that took place on 1 October 1998, at the Khalifa International Stadium in Doha, Qatar, to determine the winner of the 1998 Arab Cup. Saudi Arabia defeated Qatar 3–1 to win their first Arab Cup.

== Road to the final ==
| Saudi Arabia | | Qatar | |
| Opponents | Results | Opponents | Results |
Group stage
| Algeria U23 | 3–0 | Libya | 2–1 |
| Lebanon | 4–1 | Jordan | 2–0 |
Semi-finals
| Kuwait | 2–1 | United Arab Emirates | 2–1 |

== Match ==
=== Details ===
1 October 1998
23:00

| Saudi Arabia | 3–1 | Qatar |
|---|---|---|
| O. Al-Dosari 28', 49', 64' | Report | Mustafa 82' |

Khalifa International Stadium, Doha
Attendance: 25,000
Referee: Hicham Kirat (Tunisia)

| Saudi Arabia | Qatar |

Saudi Arabia:
| GK | 1 | Mohamed Al-Deayea |
| DF | 2 | Mohammed Sheliah |
| DF | 3 | Mohammed Al-Khilaiwi |
| DF | 4 | Abdullah Sulaiman | (yellow card) 29' |
| DF | 13 | Hussein Abdulghani |
| MF | 6 | Ibrahim Mater |
| MF | 8 | Khalid Al Temawi |
| MF | 15 | Yousuf Al-Thunayan (c) | | (substituted off) 78' |
| MF | 16 | Khamis Al-Owairan | (yellow card) 57' |
| FW | 11 | Obeid Al-Dosari |
| FW | 14 | Saad Al-Dosari | | (substituted off) 55' |
Substitutes:
| MF | – | Faysal Abou Thnein | | (substituted on) 55' |
| MF | – | Ibrahim Al-Shahrani | | (substituted on) 78' |
Manager:
(Germany) Otto Pfister

Qatar:
| GK | – | Ahmed Khalil |
| DF | – | Saoud Fath |
| DF | – | Yousef Adam |
| DF | – | Dahi Al Naemi |
| DF | – | Abdulla Koni | (substituted off) 58' |
| MF | – | Abdulrahman Al-Kuwari |
| MF | – | Abdulnasser Al-Obaidly |
| MF | – | Adel Khamis |
| MF | – | Yasser Nazmi | (substituted off) 60' |
| FW | – | Mahmoud Soufi | (substituted off) 72' |
| FW | – | Mubarak Mustafa |
Substitutes:
| MF | – | Abdulaziz Hassan | (substituted on) 58' |
| MF | – | Fahad Al-Kuwari | (substituted on) 60' |
| FW | – | ? | (substituted on) 72' |
Manager:
(Brazil) Luiz Gonzaga Milioli

Assistant referees:
Yousef Al-Qahtan (Bahrain)
Aouni Hassouna (Jordan)
Fourth official:
... ... (...)

Man of the Match:
Obeid Al-Dosari (Saudi Arabia)
