= 22nd Arabian Gulf Cup =

International football tournament in 2014

- The official logo

Tournament details
- Host country: Saudi Arabia
- Dates: 13–26 November
- Teams: 8 (from 1 confederation)
- Venues: 2 (in 1 host city)

Final positions
- Champions: Qatar (3rd title)
- Runners-up: Saudi Arabia
- Third place: United Arab Emirates
- Fourth place: Oman

Tournament statistics
- Matches played: 16
- Goals scored: 33 (2.06 per match)
- Top scorer: (United Arab Emirates) Ali Mabkhout (5 goals)
- Best player: (Saudi Arabia) Nawaf Al-Abed
- Best goalkeeper: (Qatar) Qasem Burhan
- Fair play award: Oman

The 22nd Gulf Cup (Arabic: كأس الخليج العربي) was the 22nd edition of the biennial football competition, and took place between 13 and 26 November 2014 in Riyadh, Saudi Arabia.

It was scheduled to take place in Basra, Iraq but was shifted after concerns over preparations and security. Iraq was also due to host the 2013 tournament, but this was moved to Bahrain instead. After being moved to Saudi Arabia, Jeddah was initially announced as the host city but was later moved to Riyadh.

Qatar won the cup by defeating Saudi Arabia 2–1 in the final.

== Teams and draw ==
The draw took place on 12 August 2014.

Eight teams were divided into two groups, Saudi Arabia (the host nation) were in group A, the United Arab Emirates (the holders) in group B, while the rest of the teams were placed in a pot based on FIFA ranking.

Draw position	Team	Finals appearance	Previous best performance	FIFA Rankings
Draw position	Team	Finals appearance	Previous best performance	July 2014 (Note: The rankings of July 2014 were used for seeding for the draw)
A1 (seed)	Saudi Arabia	21st	Winners (1994, 2002, 2003)	78
B1 (seed)	United Arab Emirates	21st	Winners (2007, 2013)	65
B2	Oman	20th	Winners (2009)	69
A2	Qatar	22nd	Winners (1992, 2004)	86
A3	Bahrain	22nd	Runners-up (1970, 1982, 1992, 2003)	105
B3	Iraq	13th	Winners (1979, 1984, 1988)	89
A4	Yemen	7th	Group stage (2003, 2004, 2007, 2009, 2010, 2013)	180
B4	Kuwait	22nd	Winners (1970, 1972, 1974, 1976, 1982, 1986, 1990, 1996, 1998, 2010)	107

== Venues ==
Riyadh	Riyadh
King Fahd Stadium	Prince Faisal bin Fahd Stadium
Capacity: 68,000	Capacity: 22,500

== Group stage ==
- All times are local (UTC+03:00).

=== Group A ===
Team	Pld	W	D	L	GF	GA	GD	Pts
Saudi Arabia	3	2	1	0	5	1	+4	7
Qatar	3	0	3	0	1	1	0	3
Yemen	3	0	2	1	0	1	−1	2
Bahrain	3	0	2	1	0	3	−3	2

13 November 2014
19:00

Saudi Arabia	1–1	Qatar
Al-Muwallad 37'	Report	Majid 54'

King Fahd International Stadium, Riyadh
Referee: Ben Williams (Australia)
13 November 2014
21:30

Yemen	0–0	Bahrain
	Report

King Fahd International Stadium, Riyadh
Referee: Fahad Al-Kassar (United Arab Emirates)

16 November 2014
17:45

Yemen	0–0	Qatar
	Report

King Fahd International Stadium, Riyadh
Referee: Yaqoob Abdul Baki (Oman)
16 November 2014
20:15

Saudi Arabia	3–0	Bahrain
Al-Shamrani 26'; Al-Haza'a 54' (o.g.); Husain 70' (o.g.)	Report

King Fahd International Stadium, Riyadh
Referee: Mohanad Qasim Eesee Sarray (Iraq)

19 November 2014
19:45

Saudi Arabia	1–0	Yemen
Al Abed 28'	Report

King Fahd International Stadium, Riyadh
Referee: Damir Skomina (Slovenia)
19 November 2014
19:45

Bahrain	0–0	Qatar
	Report

Prince Faisal bin Fahd Stadium, Riyadh
Referee: Ali Shaban (Kuwait)

=== Group B ===
Team	Pld	W	D	L	GF	GA	GD	Pts
Oman	3	1	2	0	6	1	+5	5
United Arab Emirates	3	1	2	0	4	2	+2	5
Kuwait	3	1	1	1	3	7	−4	4
Iraq	3	0	1	2	1	4	−3	1

14 November 2014
17:45

United Arab Emirates	0–0	Oman
	Report

Prince Faisal bin Fahd Stadium, Riyadh
Referee: Marai Al-Awaji (Saudi Arabia)
14 November 2014
20:15

Iraq	0–1	Kuwait
	Report	Al Enezi 90+2'

Prince Faisal bin Fahd Stadium, Riyadh
Referee: Damir Skomina (Slovenia)

17 November 2014
17:45

United Arab Emirates	2–2	Kuwait
Mabkhout 18', 35'	Report	Nasser 37'; Al-Mutawa 39'

Prince Faisal bin Fahd Stadium, Riyadh
Referee: Jameel Abdulhusin (Bahrain)
17 November 2014
20:15

Iraq	1–1	Oman
Kasim 14'	Report	Mubarak 51' (pen.)

Prince Faisal bin Fahd Stadium, Riyadh
Referee: Abdullah Balideh (Qatar)

20 November 2014
19:45

United Arab Emirates	2–0	Iraq
Mabkhout 50', 62'	Report

King Fahd International Stadium, Riyadh
Referee: Fahad Al-Mirdasi (Saudi Arabia)
20 November 2014
19:45

Kuwait	0–5	Oman
	Report	Al-Muqbali 44', 90'; Al-Ruzaiqi 45+3', 48', 59'

Prince Faisal bin Fahd Stadium, Riyadh
Referee: Ben Williams (Australia)

== Knockout stage ==
Semi-finals
23 November – Riyadh
Saudi Arabia	3
United Arab Emirates	2
23 November – Riyadh
Oman	1
Qatar	3

Final
26 November – Riyadh
Saudi Arabia	1
Qatar	2
Third place
25 November – Riyadh
United Arab Emirates	1
Oman	0

=== Semi-finals ===
23 November 2014
17:45

Oman	1–3	Qatar
Saleh 24'	Report	Al-Haydos 36' (pen.); Assadalla 59', 67'

King Fahd International Stadium, Riyadh
Referee: Marcin Borski (Poland)

23 November 2014
21:00

Saudi Arabia	3–2	United Arab Emirates
Al-Shamrani 19'; Al Abed 22'; Al-Dawsari 86'	Report	Khalil 53', 79'

King Fahd International Stadium, Riyadh
Referee: Valentin Kovalenko (Uzbekistan)

=== Third place play-off ===
25 November 2014
17:45

United Arab Emirates	1–0	Oman
Mabkhout 59'	Report

Prince Faisal bin Fahd Stadium, Riyadh
Referee: Abdullah Balideh (Qatar)

=== Final ===
26 November 2014
19:45

Saudi Arabia	1–2	Qatar
Kariri 16'	Report	Mukhtar 18'; Khoukhi 58'

King Fahd International Stadium, Riyadh
Referee: Mohanad Qasim Sarray (Iraq)

== Winners ==
22nd Arabian Gulf Cup winners

Qatar
Third title

== Goalscorers ==
5 goals

- (United Arab Emirates) Ali Mabkhout

3 goals

- (Oman) Said Al-Ruzaiqi

2 goals

- (Oman) Abdulaziz Al-Muqbali
- (Qatar) Ali Assadalla
- (Saudi Arabia) Nasser Al-Shamrani
- (Saudi Arabia) Nawaf Al Abed
- (United Arab Emirates) Ahmed Khalil

1 goal

- (Iraq) Yaser Kasim
- (Kuwait) Bader Al-Mutawa
- (Kuwait) Fahad Al Enezi
- (Kuwait) Yousef Nasser
- (Oman) Ahmed Mubarak Al-Mahaijri
- (Oman) Raed Ibrahim Saleh
- (Qatar) Almahdi Ali Mukhtar
- (Qatar) Boualem Khoukhi
- (Qatar) Hassan Al-Haydos
- (Qatar) Ibrahim Majid
- (Saudi Arabia) Fahad Al-Muwallad
- (Saudi Arabia) Salem Al-Dawsari
- (Saudi Arabia) Saud Kariri

1 own goal

- (Bahrain) Abdulla Al-Haza'a (playing against Saudi Arabia)
- (Bahrain) Mohamed Husain (playing against Saudi Arabia)

== Team statistics ==
This table shows all team performance.

Pos	Team	Pld	W	D	L	GF	GA	GD
Final phase
1	Qatar	5	2	3	0	6	3	+3
2	Saudi Arabia	5	3	1	1	9	5	+4
3	United Arab Emirates	5	2	2	1	7	5	+2
4	Oman	5	1	2	2	7	5	+2
Eliminated in the group stage
5	Kuwait	3	1	1	1	3	7	−4
6	Yemen	3	0	2	1	0	1	−1
7	Bahrain	3	0	2	1	0	3	−3
8	Iraq	3	0	1	2	1	4	−3

== Awards ==
The following awards were given:

Award	Player
Fair Play Award	Oman
Top Scorer	(United Arab Emirates) Ali Mabkhout
Most Valuable player	(Saudi Arabia) Nawaf Al-Abid
Best Goalkeeper	(Qatar) Qasem Burhan
