= Habib Jafar =

Iraqi footballer

Personal information
- Full name: Habib Jafar Akal
- Date of birth: 1 July 1966 (age 60)
- Place of birth: Baghdad, Iraq
- Position: Right winger

Team information
- Current team: Al-Zafaraniyah (Manager)

Senior career*
Years	Team	Apps	(Gls)
1982–1985	Al-Talaba		
1985–1990	Al-Rasheed		
1990–1991	Al-Quwa Al-Jawiya		
1991–1993	Al-Talaba		
1993–1995	Qatar SC		
1995–1996	Al-Ittihad		
1996–1998	Al-Wakrah		
1998–2000	Al-Ansar		
2000–2004	Al-Talaba		

International career
1986–2001	Iraq	76	(15)

Managerial career
- 2007: Al-Talaba
- 2017: Al-Talaba
- 2020: Al-Zafaraniyah
- * Club domestic league appearances and goals

Habib Jafar Akal (Arabic: حَبِيب جَعْفَر عَقَل; born 1 July 1966) is a former Iraqi footballer. He was featured on the national team many times and is remembered for competing in various Gulf Cup competitions. In the 1988 Gulf Cup, he was voted as the best player of the competition. He became a regular of the national team at a young age and was almost even called up for the 1986 World Cup in Mexico, but he was thought to be to inexperienced by then-coach, Evaristo de Macedo.

== Career ==
He was a key player in the Iraqi national team during the late 1980s and through the 1990s. Habib first appeared in the national team in 1988, playing in the Arab Championship, Olympics in Seoul and the Gulf Cup, where he was voted as player of the tournament. Was an important part of a talented Iraqi side that nearly qualified for the World Cup in 1994. However, in their penultimate match against Iran, he was sent off receiving a red card, and did not participate in their next and last game against Japan.

He spent his time with clubs in Iraq, and spent a 4-year spell in Qatar with Al-Rayyan, Al-Ittihad (now known as "Al-Gharaffa"), and Al-Wakra, and in the latest part of his career, with Dhofar of Oman.

Retired from the international scene after being omitted from the Asian Cup squad in Lebanon in 2000, by Milan Zivadinovic, but was surprisingly brought back by Adnan Hamad after the sacking of Milan in February 2001. Habib was placed by the German-based Federation of Football History & Statistics as Iraq's 3rd best player of the century.

== Career statistics ==
=== International goals ===
Scores and results list Iraq's goal tally first.

No.	Date	Venue	Opponent	Score	Result	Competition
1.	27 March 1986	Bahrain National Stadium, Riffa	Qatar	1–0	1–1	8th Arabian Gulf Cup
2.	8 March 1988	King Fahd International Stadium, Riyadh	Qatar	1–0	3–0	9th Arabian Gulf Cup
3.	13 January 1989	Amman International Stadium, Amman	Jordan	1–0	1–0	1990 FIFA World Cup qualification
4.	26 February 1990	Jaber Al-Ahmad International Stadium, Kuwait City	Bahrain	1–0	1–0	10th Arabian Gulf Cup
5.	18 August 1992	Al-Hassan Stadium, Irbid	Ethiopia	4–0	13–0	1992 Jordan Tournament
6.	18 August 1992	Al-Hassan Stadium, Irbid	Ethiopia	8–0	13–0	1992 Jordan Tournament
7.	26 August 1992	Al-Hassan Stadium, Irbid	Moldova	1–0	1–0	1992 Jordan Tournament
8.	19 October 1993	Khalifa International Stadium, Doha	South Korea	2–2	2–2	1994 FIFA World Cup qualification
9.	16 February 1997	Al-Shaab Stadium, Baghdad	Jordan	1–0	1–0	Friendly
10.	17 November 1998	National Stadium, Beirut	Lebanon	2–0	2–0	Friendly
11.	3 August 1999	Central Stadium, Dushanbe	Tajikistan	2–1	2–1	2000 AFC Asian Cup qualification
12.	29 August 1999	Amman International Stadium, Amman	Libya	1–0	3–1	1999 Pan Arab Games
13.	14 April 2001	Al-Shaab Stadium, Baghdad	Nepal	4–0	9–1	2002 FIFA World Cup qualification

== See also ==
- 9th Arabian Gulf Cup
