= Mubarak Mustafa =

Qatari footballer (born 1973)

Personal information
- Full name: Mubarak Mustafa Fazli
- Date of birth: 30 March 1973 (age 53)
- Place of birth: Doha, Qatar
- Height: 1.75 m (5 ft 9 in)
- Position: Forward

Youth career
- 1985–1990: Al-Arabi

Senior career*
Years	Team	Apps	(Gls)
1990–2003	Al-Arabi		
2003–2006	Al-Khor		
2006–2007	Al-Gharafa		

International career
1992–2004	Qatar	106	(41)
- * Club domestic league appearances and goals

Mubarak Mustafa Fazli (Arabic: مبارك مصطفى; born 30 March 1973) is a Qatari former footballer who formerly worked as a sports analyst for Al Kass and now works for BeIN Sports as a sports analyst. He is known for his numerous achievements with Qatari club Al-Arabi, as well as being the former captain of the Qatar national team.

A former forward, he is one of the most prominent figures in the history of Qatari football and was an integral component of one of Qatar's best-ever national sides in the early 1990s alongside Khalid Salman, Mahmoud Soufi and Adel Khamis. According to RSSSF, he was previously the top scorer for Qatar with 41 goals.

== Early life ==
Mustafa was born in Umm Ghuwailina, a suburb of Doha located near Al Arabi's club headquarters.

== Club career ==
=== Al-Arabi ===
Mustafa was spotted by a talent scout while playing in a domestic school league at an early age. He accepted an offer to play in Al-Arabi's junior teams where he instantly stood out among his peers.

Capitalizing on this shortly after, Al-Arabi placed Mubarak Mustafa in the successful senior squad, although it was initially difficult to get a starting position in the squad. He eventually earned a permanent place in the squad after showcasing his goal-scoring ability, securing Al-Arabi's place as Qatar's best club side at the time. He reached the peak of his career in 1994, when he led the dream team into the finals of the 1994 AFC Champions League, eventually losing to Thai Farmers Bank with a score of 1–0. In the process of Al-Arabi's Champions League campaign, they became the second Qatari team to make it to the finals of the AFC Champions League, the other club being Al Sadd.

Mustafa is also the only player in history to win the Arab Golden Boot and Arab Player of the Year award in a single season. He was also the top scorer in the Qatar Stars League three times: the first being in the 1991–1992 season, the second in the 1992–1993 season, and the final time being in the 1996–1997 season.

His exploits earning him recognition internationally; he represented the Asian XI in a match in 1999 against the Thailand national team. Asian XI lost 4–1, with Mustafa netting the team's only goal from a spot kick in the 75th minute.

=== Al-Khor ===
In a move which shocked many fans, Mustafa left Al-Arabi in 2003 to join Al Khor after a string of disappointing seasons for Al-Arabi, due to personal disputes with certain officials and players in the club. Mustafa led Al-Khor to their first major trophy in 46 years in just two seasons after Al-Khor beat Al Gharafa in 2005 to claim the Qatar Crown Prince Cup for the first time in the club's history.

=== Al-Gharafa ===
In 2006, Mustafa moved to Al-Gharafa, one of the most successful teams in the Qatar Stars League. He helped them finish second in the league, as well as making it to the finals of the Qatar Crown Prince Cup. He retired from professional football in 2007, at the age of 34.

== International career ==
Mustafa started his senior international career at the age of 19. He helped establish the Qatar football team on the international stage, claiming many achievements in his time playing for the Qatar national team, most notably the 11th Arabian Gulf Cup in 1992, where he won the top scorer and man of the tournament award. He also led Qatar to the quarter-finals of the 1992 Olympic Games in Barcelona, and won the 1998 Arab Nations Cup. He played for Qatar in the 1998 World Cup Qualifiers, scoring two goals in the group stage and securing the top position in their group before getting eliminated in the final round.

In a match at the 1992 Olympic Games in Barcelona, Mustafa scored the only goal in a 1–0 win against Egypt, registering the first competitive win in Qatar's history against an African nation.

Mustafa had a reputation of being a fair player, having been shown no red cards in his international career. He later received the World Fair Play Trophy in 2005. Mustafa officially retired from international football in 2004.

== Post-retirement ==
After retiring from professional football, Mustafa was appointed the Director of football of Al-Arabi. He still occasionally manages the first team.

In 2009, Mubarak Mustafa became the first Qatari to receive the International Olympic Committee's annual ideal player award. Mustafa stated that the award represented an honor for Qatar sport and Qatar Olympic committee (QOC).

On 17 October 2011, Mustafa played a tribute game in honour of deceased Emirati player Theyab Awana. The game was between Al-Salmiya Stars and Arab Stars, with Mustafa playing for the former. Adel Khamis also took part in the match. The match took place in Thamir Stadium. Mustafa scored 2 early goals to give him a brace, however the visitors equalized in the second half and eventually narrowly won 7–6.

On 28 April 2012, after a very unsuccessful season for Al Arabi which saw them finish on par with their joint lowest standing in the league, he announced that he would be leaving the club as director of football at the end of the 2011/12 season. Shortly after, he joined Al Kass as a sports analyst.

== Career statistics ==
=== International ===
Appearances and goals by national team and year
National team	Year	Apps	Goals
Qatar	1992	13	7
Qatar	1993	7	3
Qatar	1994	4	0
Qatar	1995	–	
Qatar	1996	18	5
Qatar	1997	1	0
Qatar	1998	16	6
Qatar	1999	–	
Qatar	2000	8	6
Qatar	2001	21	8
Qatar	2002	–	
Qatar	2003	5	1
Qatar	2004	13	5
Total		106	41

Scores and results list Qatar's goal tally first, score column indicates score after each Qatar goal.

List of international goals scored by Mubarak Mustafa
No.	Date	Venue	Opponent	Score	Result	Competition
1	31 May 1992	Jassim bin Hamad Stadium, Doha, Qatar	Oman	3–0	4–0	1992 AFC Asian Cup qualification
2	31 May 1992	Jassim bin Hamad Stadium, Doha, Qatar	Oman	4–0	4–0	1992 AFC Asian Cup qualification
3	13 October 1992	Khalifa International Stadium, Doha, Qatar	Hungary	1–1	1–1	Friendly
4	31 October 1992	Hiroshima Stadium, Hiroshima, Japan	Saudi Arabia	1–0	1–1	1992 AFC Asian Cup
5	27 November 1992	Khalifa International Stadium, Doha, Qatar	Oman	1–0	2–0	11th Arabian Gulf Cup
6	27 November 1992	Khalifa International Stadium, Doha, Qatar	Oman	2–0	2–0	11th Arabian Gulf Cup
7	3 December 1992	Khalifa International Stadium, Doha, Qatar	Kuwait	4–0	4–0	11th Arabian Gulf Cup
8	11 April 1993	Khalifa International Stadium, Doha, Qatar	Vietnam	1–0	4–0	1994 FIFA World Cup qualification
9	16 April 1993	Khalifa International Stadium, Doha, Qatar	Singapore	1–1	4–1	1994 FIFA World Cup qualification
10	16 April 1993	Khalifa International Stadium, Doha, Qatar	Singapore	4–1	4–1	1994 FIFA World Cup qualification
11	21 April 1996	Grand Hamad Stadium, Doha, Qatar	Kuwait	2–0	3–1	Friendly
12	21 April 1996	Grand Hamad Stadium, Doha, Qatar	Kuwait	3–1	3–1	Friendly
13	25 May 1996	Khalifa International Stadium, Doha, Qatar	Russia	1–3	2–5	Friendly
14	20 September 1996	Khalifa International Stadium, Doha, Qatar	Sri Lanka	3–0	3–0	1998 FIFA World Cup qualification
15	27 September 1996	Khalifa International Stadium, Doha, Qatar	India	6–0	6–0	1998 FIFA World Cup qualification
16	22 September 1998	Jassim bin Hamad Stadium, Doha, Qatar	Libya	2–1	2–1	1998 Arab Cup
17	26 September 1998	Jassim bin Hamad Stadium, Doha, Qatar	Jordan	1–0	2–0	1998 Arab Cup
18	1 October 1998	Khalifa International Stadium, Doha, Qatar	Saudi Arabia	1–3	1–3	1998 Arab Cup
19	2 November 1998	Bahrain National Stadium, Riffa, Bahrain	Kuwait	2–5	2–6	14th Arabian Gulf Cup
20	3 December 1998	Suphan Buri Provincial Stadium, Suphan Buri, Thailand	Tajikistan	2–0	2–1	1998 Asian Games
21	12 December 1998	Rajamangala Stadium, Bangkok, Thailand	Thailand	1–1	2–1	1998 Asian Games
22	20 January 2000	Grand Hamad Stadium, Doha, Qatar	Bosnia and Herzegovina	1–0	2–0	Friendly
23	20 January 2000	Grand Hamad Stadium, Doha, Qatar	Bosnia and Herzegovina	2–0	2–0	Friendly
24	10 March 2000	Jassim bin Hamad Stadium, Doha, Qatar	Sudan	?–0	3–0	Friendly
25	10 March 2000	Jassim bin Hamad Stadium, Doha, Qatar	Sudan	?–0	3–0	Friendly
26	31 March 2000	Jassim bin Hamad Stadium, Doha, Qatar	Palestine	1–0	1–0	2000 AFC Asian Cup qualification
27	2 April 2000	Jassim bin Hamad Stadium, Doha, Qatar	Kazakhstan	2–0	3–1	2000 AFC Asian Cup qualification
28	5 January 2001	Hamad bin Khalifa Stadium, Doha, Qatar	Jordan	2–1	3–1	Friendly
29	12 January 2001	Grand Hamad Stadium, Doha, Qatar	Kuwait	1–0	1–0	Friendly
30	12 February 2001	Suphachalasai Stadium, Bangkok, Thailand	Thailand	1–0	3–1	2001 King's Cup
31	4 March 2001	Hong Kong Stadium, Causeway Bay, Hong Kong	Malaysia	3–1	5–1	2002 FIFA World Cup qualification
32	8 March 2001	Hong Kong Stadium, Causeway Bay, Hong Kong	Palestine	2–1	2–1	2002 FIFA World Cup qualification
33	5 August 2001	Prince Faisal bin Fahd Sports City Stadium, Riyadh, Saudi Arabia	Saudi Arabia	1–0	2–1	Friendly
34	5 August 2001	Prince Faisal bin Fahd Sports City Stadium, Riyadh, Saudi Arabia	Saudi Arabia	2–0	2–1	Friendly
35	21 September 2001	Sultan Qaboos Sports Complex, Muscat, Oman	Oman	2–0	3–0	2002 FIFA World Cup qualification
36	19 November 2003	Thani bin Jassim Stadium, Doha, Qatar	Singapore	2–0	2–0	2004 AFC Asian Cup qualification
37	5 January 2004	Al-Sadaqua Walsalam Stadium, Kuwait City, Kuwait	Yemen	1–0	3–0	17th Arabian Gulf Cup
38	8 January 2004	Al-Sadaqua Walsalam Stadium, Kuwait City, Kuwait	Kuwait	2–1	2–1	17th Arabian Gulf Cup
39	13 February 2004	Khalifa International Stadium, Doha, Qatar	Bahrain	1–0	2–0	Friendly
40	9 June 2004	Thani bin Jassim Stadium, Doha, Qatar	Laos	1–0	5–0	2006 FIFA World Cup qualification
41	9 June 2004	Thani bin Jassim Stadium, Doha, Qatar	Laos	2–0	5–0	2006 FIFA World Cup qualification

== Honours ==
Al Arabi

- Qatar Stars League: 1991, 1993, 1994, 1996, 1997
- AFC Champions League Runner up: 1994
- Sheikh Jassem Cup: 1995
- Qatar Crown Prince Cup: 1997
- Emir of Qatar Cup: 1993

Al Khor

- Qatar Crown Prince Cup: 2005

Individual

- Qatar Stars League Top Scorer: 1992
- Arabian Gulf Cup Top Scorer: 1992
- Arabian Gulf Cup Best Player: 1992
- Arab Golden Ball: 1992
- Qatar Stars League Top Scorer: 1993
- Arab Golden Boot: 1993
- Arab Player of the Year: 1993
- Qatar Stars League Most Assists: 1996
- Qatar Stars League Top Scorer: 1997
- Qatar Stars League Most Assists: 1998
- Arab Cup Most Valuable Player: 1998
- World Fair Play Trophy by the International Fair Play Committee: 2005
- International Olympic Committee Ideal Player Award: 2009

== See also ==
- List of top international men's football goal scorers by country
