= Al-Mahdi Ali Mukhtar =

Qatari footballer (born 1992)

Almahdi Ali Mukhtar
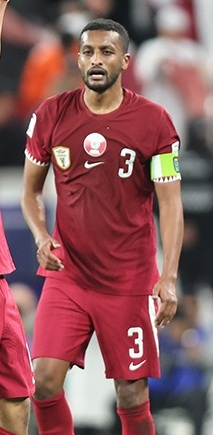
- Almahdi with Qatar at the 2023 AFC Asian Cup

Personal information
- Full name: Almahdi Ali Mukhtar
- Date of birth: 2 March 1992 (age 34)
- Place of birth: Doha, Qatar
- Height: 1.85 m (6 ft 1 in)
- Position: Center-back

Team information
- Current team: Al-Wakrah
- Number: 15

Youth career
- ASPIRE

Senior career*
Years	Team	Apps	(Gls)
2009–2015	Al Sadd	127	(24)
2015–2023	Al-Gharafa	90	(4)
2023–	Al-Wakrah	37	(0)

International career^{‡}
2012–	Qatar	86	(8)
Medal record
Representing Qatar
Men's Football
AFC Asian Cup
Winner	2023 Qatar
- * Club domestic league appearances and goals as of 17 January 2026 ‡ National team caps and goals as of 4 January 2018

Almahdi Ali Mukhtar (Arabic: المهدي علي مختار) is a Qatari professional footballer who plays as a center-back for Al-Wakrah and Qatar national football team. He became the sixth Aspire Academy graduate to play for Qatar's senior national team after he made his debut in a friendly match against Egypt on 28 December 2010.

Prior to joining Al-Gharafa SC, Almahdi played as a defender for Al Sadd SC. In 2015, Almahdi was officially signed by Al-Gharafa SC and continues to play as a defender.

== International career ==
On 3 January 2024, he was named in Qatar's squad for the 2023 AFC Asian Cup.

=== International goals ===
Scores and results list Qatar's goal tally first.

No	Date	Venue	Opponent	Score	Result	Competition
1.	21 December 2013	Jassim bin Hamad Stadium, Doha, Qatar	Bahrain	1–1	1–1	Friendly
2.	26 November 2014	King Fahd International Stadium, Riyadh, Saudi Arabia	Saudi Arabia	1–1	2–1	22nd Arabian Gulf Cup
3.	22 December 2017	Al Kuwait Sports Club Stadium, Kuwait City, Kuwait	Yemen	2–0	4–0	23rd Arabian Gulf Cup

== Honours ==
Al Sadd

- Qatar Stars League: 2012–13
- Emir of Qatar Cup: 2014, 2015
- Qatari Stars Cup: 2014
- Qatari Stars Cup: 2010
- AFC Champions League: 2011

Al-Gharafa

- Qatari Stars Cup: 2018–19

Qatar

- AFC Asian Cup: 2023
- Arabian Gulf Cup: 2014
