= Mohamed Saeed Afifa =

Qatari footballer (born 1962)

Personal information
- Full name: Mohammed Saeed Jaher Afifa
- Date of birth: 6 December 1962 (age 63)
- Place of birth: Doha, Qatar
- Position: Midfielder

Senior career*
Years	Team	Apps	(Gls)
–1986	Al Rayyan		

International career
1981	Qatar U–20	6	(0)
1981–1986	Qatar		
- * Club domestic league appearances and goals

Mohamed Saeed Afifa is a Qatari former football Midfielder who played for Qatar in the 1980s, and also at the 1984 Asian Cup.

== Club career ==
Afifa played for Al-Rayyan throughout his entire career winning several Qatari League titles.

== International career ==
Afifa was selected for the 1981 FIFA World Youth Championship helping the team reach the final. The following year, he was called up to the senior squad for the 1982 Gulf Cup. He also played at the 1984 Asian Cup.
