= Arabian Gulf Cup =

Regional association football tournament

- Organiser(s): Gulf Football Federation (GFF)
- Founded: 1970; 56 years ago
- Teams: 8
- Current champions: Saudi Arabia (4th title)
- Most championships: Kuwait (10 titles)
- Website: the-gff.com
- 27th Arabian Gulf Cup

The Arabian Gulf Cup (Arabic: كأس الخليج العربي, Kaʾs al-Khalīj al-ʿArabī), also referred to simply as the Gulf Cup, is a biennial association football competition governed by the Gulf Football Federation for its eight member nations. The history of the competition has also seen it held every three to four years due to political or organisational problems. The reigning champions are Saudi Arabia, who won their fourth title at the 27th edition.

== History ==
The idea for the tournament was established at the 1968 Summer Olympics, and the first Arabian Gulf Cup took place in 1970 which was won by Kuwait. Kuwait has been the most successful team in the tournament's history, winning 10 tournaments out of 27 in total, followed by Iraq and Saudi Arabia with four titles each, and Qatar with three titles.

== Developments ==
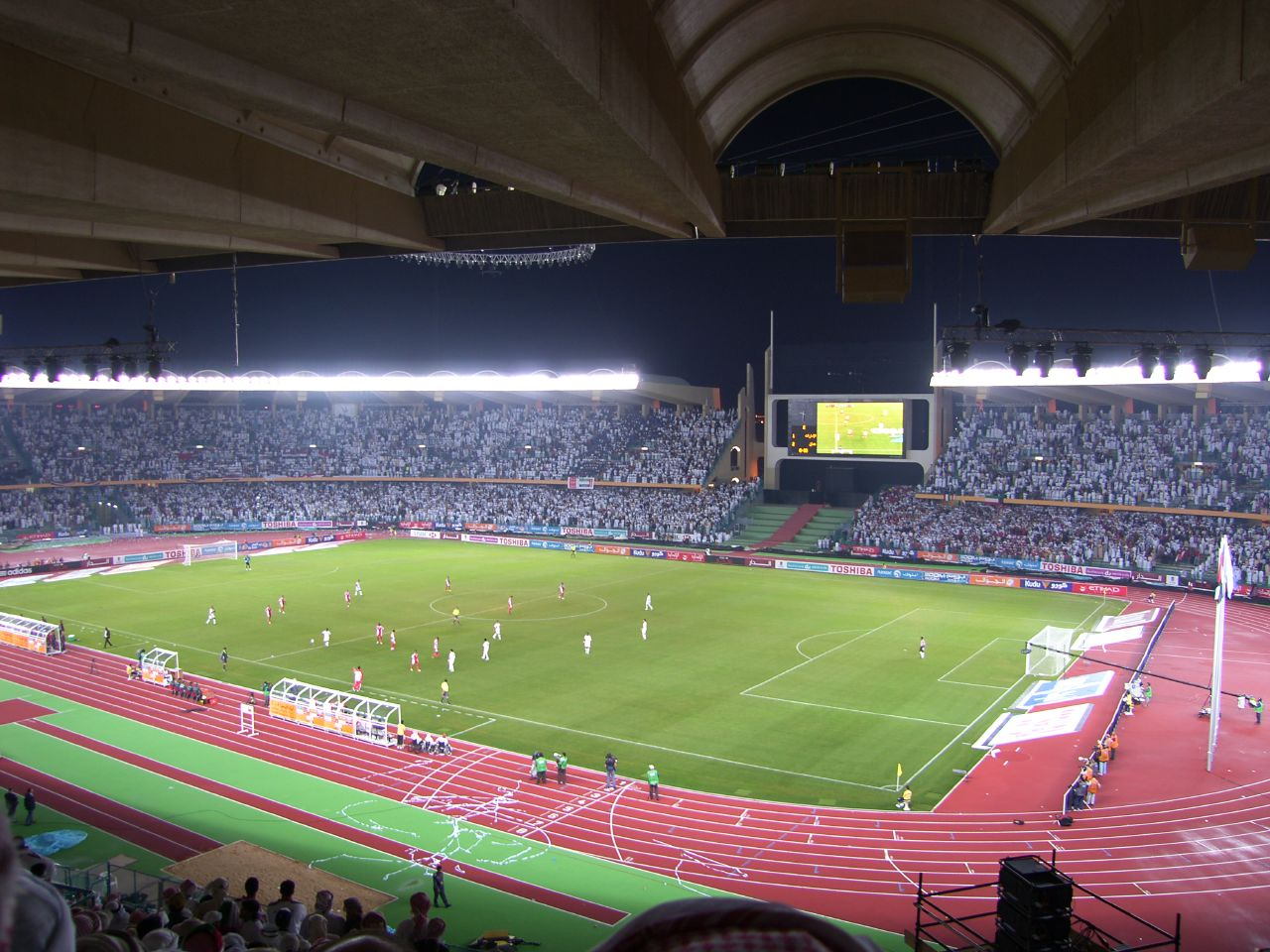
View of the jam-packed stadium during the 18th Arabian Gulf Cup in Abu Dhabi in 2007

A major point that helped Qatar improve the competition was that Al Jazeera Sports, the leading sports channel in Western Asia and North Africa, which is based in Doha, became involved. Al Jazeera Sports won broadcasting rights to the 2004 and exclusively to the 2009 event (19th Arabian Gulf Cup). The channel dramatically reformed the Arabian Gulf Cup by hosting numerous talk shows and documentaries, on top of filming in HD and perfecting camerawork of matches.

The tournament marked the presence of some of the most influential personalities of the football world, including FIFA President Sepp Blatter and UEFA president Michel Platini. Furthermore, for their October 4, 2013 meeting, the FIFA Executive Committee agreed to hear the proposal for the Arabian Gulf Cup to be included in the international match calendar.

== Political and security issues ==
From 1990 to 2003, Iraq was banned due to the Gulf War.

The 21st Arabian Gulf Cup in 2013 was originally scheduled to be hosted in the city of Basra, Iraq, but was moved to Bahrain in October 2011 to ensure that Iraq could suitably host the competition in the 22nd edition.

The 22nd Arabian Gulf Cup was also shifted after concerns of preparation and security.

Likewise, the 23rd Arabian Gulf Cup was also originally scheduled to be held in Basra, Iraq, with an official decision set to be made in February 2015. On 2 February 2015, the Iraqi Ministry of Youth announced that Iraq would not host the competition due to a financial crisis in Iraq.

In 2017, Saudi Arabia, the United Arab Emirates and Bahrain cut diplomatic ties with Qatar. In July 2019, the AGCFF announced that the 24th edition of the Arabian Gulf Cup would be held in the Qatari capital of Doha. In October 2019, the three countries announced they would not participate in the competition. However, later in November 2019, the three countries agreed to take part and the draw for the tournament was re-made.

== Results ==
Ed.	Year	Host	Final			Third place match or losing semi-finalists			Teams
Ed.	Year	Host	(gold) Champions	Score	(silver) Runners-up	(bronze) Third place	Score	Fourth place	Teams
1	1970	Bahrain	Kuwait	round-robin	Bahrain	Saudi Arabia	round-robin	Qatar	4
2	1972	Saudi Arabia	Kuwait	round-robin	Saudi Arabia	United Arab Emirates	round-robin	Qatar	4
3	1974	Kuwait	Kuwait	4–0	Saudi Arabia	Qatar	1–1 (a.e.t.) (3–0 p)	United Arab Emirates	6
4	1976	Qatar	Kuwait	4–2	Iraq	Qatar	round-robin	Bahrain	7
5	1979	Iraq	Iraq	round-robin	Kuwait	Saudi Arabia	round-robin	Bahrain	7
6	1982	United Arab Emirates	Kuwait	round-robin	Bahrain	United Arab Emirates	round-robin	Saudi Arabia	6
7	1984	Oman	Iraq	1–1 (a.e.t.) (3–2 p)	Qatar	Saudi Arabia	round-robin	United Arab Emirates	7
8	1986	Bahrain	Kuwait	round-robin	United Arab Emirates	Saudi Arabia	round-robin	Qatar	7
9	1988	Saudi Arabia	Iraq	round-robin	United Arab Emirates	Saudi Arabia	round-robin	Bahrain	7
10	1990	Kuwait	Kuwait	round-robin	Qatar	Bahrain	round-robin	Oman	5
11	1992	Qatar	Qatar	round-robin	Bahrain	Saudi Arabia	round-robin	United Arab Emirates	6
12	1994	United Arab Emirates	Saudi Arabia	round-robin	United Arab Emirates	Bahrain	round-robin	Qatar	6
13	1996	Oman	Kuwait	round-robin	Qatar	Saudi Arabia	round-robin	United Arab Emirates	6
14	1998	Bahrain	Kuwait	round-robin	Saudi Arabia	United Arab Emirates	round-robin	Oman	6
15	2002	Saudi Arabia	Saudi Arabia	round-robin	Qatar	Kuwait	round-robin	Bahrain	6
16	2003–04	Kuwait	Saudi Arabia	round-robin	Bahrain	Qatar	round-robin	Oman	7
17	2004	Qatar	Qatar	1–1 (a.e.t.) (6–5 p)	Oman	Bahrain	3–1	Kuwait	8
18	2007	United Arab Emirates	United Arab Emirates	1–0	Oman	Bahrain and Saudi Arabia			8
19	2009	Oman	Oman	0–0 (a.e.t.) (6–5 p)	Saudi Arabia	Kuwait and Qatar			8
20	2010	Yemen	Kuwait	1–0	Saudi Arabia	Iraq and United Arab Emirates			8
21	2013	Bahrain	United Arab Emirates	2–1 (a.e.t.)	Iraq	Kuwait	6–1	Bahrain	8
22	2014	Saudi Arabia	Qatar	2–1	Saudi Arabia	United Arab Emirates	1–0	Oman	8
23	2017–18	Kuwait	Oman	0–0 (a.e.t.) (5–4 p)	United Arab Emirates	Bahrain and Iraq			8
24	2019	Qatar	Bahrain	1–0	Saudi Arabia	Iraq and Qatar			8
25	2023	Iraq	Iraq	3–2 (a.e.t.)	Oman	Bahrain and Qatar			8
26	2024–25	Kuwait	Bahrain	2–1	Oman	Kuwait and Saudi Arabia			8
27	2026	Saudi Arabia	Saudi Arabia	2–0	United Arab Emirates	Oman and Qatar			8
28	2028	Iraq	TBD			TBD			8

== Winners summary ==
Team	Winners	Runners-up	Third place	Fourth place	Semi-finalists (no third place match)
Kuwait	10 (1970, 1972, 1974*, 1976, 1982, 1986, 1990*, 1996, 1998, 2010)	1 (1979)	2 (2002, 2013)	1 (2004)	2 (2009, 2024–25*)
Saudi Arabia	4 (1994, 2002*, 2003–04, 2026)	7 (1972*, 1974, 1998, 2009, 2010, 2014*, 2019)	7 (1970, 1979, 1984, 1986, 1988*, 1992, 1996)	1 (1982)	2 (2007, 2024–25)
Iraq	4 (1979*, 1984, 1988, 2023*)	2 (1976, 2013)	–	–	3 (2010, 2017–18, 2019)
Qatar	3 (1992*, 2004*, 2014)	4 (1984, 1990, 1996, 2002)	2 (1976*, 2003–04)	5 (1970, 1972, 1974, 1986, 1994)	4 (2009, 2019*, 2023, 2026)
United Arab Emirates	2 (2007*, 2013)	5 (1986, 1988, 1994*, 2017–18, 2026)	5 (1972, 1974, 1982*, 1998, 2014)	3 (1984, 1992, 1996)	1 (2010)
Bahrain	2 (2019, 2024–25)	4 (1970*, 1982, 1992, 2003–04)	3 (1990, 1994, 2004)	5 (1976, 1979, 1988, 2002, 2013*)	3 (2007, 2017–18, 2023)
Oman	2 (2009*, 2017–18)	4 (2004, 2007, 2023, 2024–25)	–	4 (1990, 1998, 2003–04, 2014)	1 (2026)

Note:

- An asterisk (*) beside the year in the above table means that country hosted the tournament.

== Participating nations ==
Team	(Bahrain) 1970	(Saudi Arabia) 1972	(Kuwait) 1974	(Qatar) 1976	(Iraq) 1979	(United Arab Emirates) 1982	(Oman) 1984	(Bahrain) 1986	(Saudi Arabia) 1988	(Kuwait) 1990	(Qatar) 1992	(United Arab Emirates) 1994	(Oman) 1996	(Bahrain) 1998	(Saudi Arabia) 2002	(Kuwait) 2003–04	(Qatar) 2004	(United Arab Emirates) 2007	(Oman) 2009	(Yemen) 2010	(Bahrain) 2013	(Saudi Arabia) 2014	(Kuwait) 2017–18	(Qatar) 2019	(Iraq) 2023	(Kuwait) 2024–25	(Saudi Arabia) 2026	Total
Bahrain	2nd	×	GS	4th	4th	2nd	GS	GS	4th	3rd	2nd	3rd	GS	GS	GS	2nd	3rd	SF	GS	GS	4th	GS	SF	1st	SF	1st	GS	27
United Arab Emirates		3rd	4th	GS	GS	3rd	4th	2nd	2nd	GS	4th	2nd	4th	3rd	GS	GS	GS	1st	GS	SF	1st	3rd	2nd	GS	GS	GS	2nd	26
Iraq				2nd	1st	×	1st	GS	1st	×							GS	GS	GS	SF	2nd	GS	SF	SF	1st	GS	GS	18
Kuwait	1st	1st	1st	1st	2nd	1st	GS	1st	GS	1st	GS	GS	1st	1st	3rd	GS	4th	GS	SF	1st	3rd	GS	GS	GS	GS	SF	GS	27
Oman			GS	GS	GS	GS	GS	GS	GS	4th	GS	GS	GS	4th	GS	4th	2nd	2nd	1st	GS	GS	4th	1st	GS	2nd	2nd	SF	25
Qatar	4th	4th	3rd	3rd	GS	GS	2nd	4th	GS	2nd	1st	4th	2nd	GS	2nd	3rd	1st	GS	SF	GS	GS	1st	GS	SF	SF	GS	SF	27
Saudi Arabia	3rd	2nd	2nd	GS	3rd	4th	3rd	3rd	3rd		3rd	1st	3rd	2nd	1st	1st	GS	SF	2nd	2nd	GS	2nd	GS	2nd	GS	SF	1st	26
Yemen																GS	GS	GS	GS	GS	GS	GS	GS	GS	GS	GS	GS	12
Total	4	5	6	7	7	7	7	7	7	6	6	6	6	6	6	7	8	8	8	8	8	8	8	8	8	8	8	

Legend:

- 1st – Champions
- 2nd – Runners-up
- 3rd – Third place
- 4th – Fourth place
- SF – Semi finalist
- GS – Group stage
- Q — Qualified for upcoming tournament
- × — Withdrew / Disqualified
- — Hosts
- — Did not participate

Note:

- Iraq was banned from the competition from 1992 to 2003.
- There were no third place play-offs for the Arabian Gulf Cup from 2007 to 2010 and from 2017–18 onwards.

== Summary ==
As of 6 October 2026

Rank	Team	Part	Pld	W	D	L	GF	GA	GD	Pts
1	Saudi Arabia	26	121	63	26	32	183	114	+69	215
2	Kuwait	27	122	58	25	39	207	126	+81	200
3	Qatar	27	121	45	33	43	147	141	+6	168
4	United Arab Emirates	26	119	44	32	43	131	146	−15	164
5	Iraq	16	79	39	26	14	138	74	+64	143
6	Bahrain	26	115	36	34	45	124	149	–25	142
7	Oman	24	120	26	32	62	102	192	–90	110
8	Yemen	12	39	2	6	31	21	96	−75	12

Notes:

1. Bahrain were ejected from the competition in 1972
2. Iraq withdrew from the competition in 1982
3. Iraq withdrew from the competition in 1990

== Goal records ==
=== Goals scored by tournament ===
Tournament	Matches	Goals scored	Goals per match
1970	6	19	3.17
1972	6	25	4.17
1974	10	40	4.00
1976	22	84	3.82
1979	21	70	3.33
1982	15	38	2.53
1984	22	51	2.32
1986	21	53	2.52
1988	21	34	1.62
1990	10	21	2.10
1992	15	30	2.00
1994	15	34	2.27
1996	15	35	2.33
1998	15	40	2.67
2002	15	33	2.20
2003–04	21	46	2.19
2004	16	59	3.69
2007	15	34	2.27
2009	15	31	2.07
2010	15	30	2.00
2013	16	36	2.25
2014	16	33	2.06
2017–18	15	23	1.53
2019	15	45	3.00
2023	15	39	2.60
2024–25	15	41	2.73
2026	15	39	2.60

- Kuwait reached 100 goals on 3 March 1988 vs Qatar
- Kuwait reached 200 goals on 13 January 2023 vs Bahrain
- Saudi Arabia reached 100 goals on 19 October 1996 vs Qatar
- Qatar reached 100 goals on 16 December 2004 vs Oman
- Iraq reached 100 goals on 2 December 2010 vs Kuwait
- Bahrain reached 100 goals on 11 January 2013 vs Qatar
- United Arab Emirates reached 100 goals on 11 January 2013 vs Oman
- Oman reached 100 goals on 29 September 2026 vs Kuwait

Does not include goals from annulled or abandoned games (1972 – Bahrain games, 1982 & 1990 Iraq games)

Includes 1974 preliminary round games

Does not include penalty shoot-out goals

=== All-time top scorers ===
Updated on 4 December 2019.

Rank	Player	Country	Goals
1	Jasem Yaqoub	Kuwait	18
2	Majed Abdullah	Saudi Arabia	17
2	Hussein Saeed	Iraq	17
4	Jasem Al Huwaidi	Kuwait	14
4	Faisal Al-Dakhil	Kuwait	14
6	Ali Mabkhout	United Arab Emirates	13
6	Mansour Muftah	Qatar	13
8	Bader Al-Mutawa	Kuwait	12
8	Yussef Al-Suwayed	Kuwait	12
10	Fahad Khamees	United Arab Emirates	10
10	Mahmoud Soufi	Qatar	10
10	Yasser Al-Qahtani	Saudi Arabia	10

Players in bold are still active.

=== Top scorers by tournament ===
Tournament	Player(s)	Goals scored
1970	(Kuwait) Mohammed Al-Masoud	3
1970	(Kuwait) Jawad Khalaf	3
1972	(Saudi Arabia) Saeed Ghorab	5
1974	(Kuwait) Jasem Yaqoub	6
1976	(Kuwait) Jasem Yaqoub	9
1979	(Iraq) Hussein Saeed	10
1982	(Bahrain) Ibrahim Zowayed	3
1982	(United Arab Emirates) Salem Khalifa	3
1982	(Kuwait) Yussef Al-Suwayed	3
1982	(Saudi Arabia) Majed Abdullah	3
1984	(Iraq) Hussain Saeed	7
1986	(United Arab Emirates) Fahad Khamees	6
1988	(United Arab Emirates) Zuhair Bakheet	4
1988	(Iraq) Ahmed Radhi	4
1990	(Kuwait) Mohammed Hajeyah	5
1992	(Qatar) Mubarak Mustafa	3
1994	(Saudi Arabia) Fuad Anwar	4
1994	(Qatar) Mahmoud Soufi	4
1996	(Qatar) Mohammed Salem Al-Enazi	4
1998	(Kuwait) Jasem Al-Huwaidi	9
2002	(Oman) Hani Al-Dhabit	5
2003–04	(Bahrain) Talal Yousef	5
2004	(Oman) Amad Al-Hosni	4
2007	(United Arab Emirates) Ismail Matar	5
2009	(Oman) Hassan Rabia	4
2010	(Kuwait) Bader Al-Mutawa	3
2010	(Iraq) Alaa Abdul-Zahra	3
2013	(United Arab Emirates) Ahmed Khalil	3
2013	(Kuwait) Abdulhadi Khamis	3
2014	(United Arab Emirates) Ali Mabkhout	5
2017–18	(Iraq) Ali Husni	2
2017–18	(Iraq) Ali Faez	2
2017–18	(Bahrain) Jamal Rashid	2
2017–18	(Qatar) Almoez Ali	2
2017–18	(Oman) Said Al-Ruzaiqi	2
2019	(United Arab Emirates) Ali Mabkhout	5
2023	(Iraq) Aymen Hussein	3
2023	(Iraq) Ibrahim Bayesh	3
2024–25	(Bahrain) Mohamed Marhoon	3
2024–25	(Oman) Issam Al-Sabhi	3
2024–25	(Saudi Arabia) Abdullah Al-Hamdan	3
2026	(Oman) Nasser Al-Rawahi	3
2026	(Saudi Arabia) Firas Al-Buraikan	3

== Other records ==
- Biggest win – 8 goals

Kuwait 8–0 Oman (29 March 1976)

- Most goals in a game – 8 goals

Kuwait 8–0 Oman (29 March 1976)

- Most individual goals in a single game – 5 goals

Majed Abdullah, Saudi Arabia (3 April 1979 vs Qatar)
Jassem Al Houwaidi, Kuwait (1998 vs Qatar)

- Most individual goals in a single tournament – 10 goals

Hussein Saeed, Iraq (1979)

== See also ==
- Gulf Cup for Veteran Players
- GFF U-23 Gulf Cup
- GFF U-20 Gulf Cup
- GFF U-17 Gulf Cup
- GCC Futsal Cup
- WAFF Championship
- FIFA Arab Cup
