= 12th Arabian Gulf Cup =

International football tournament in 1994

Tournament details
- Host country: UAE
- Dates: 3–16 November
- Venue: 1 (in 1 host city)

Final positions
- Champions: Saudi Arabia (1st title)

Tournament statistics
- Matches played: 15
- Goals scored: 34 (2.27 per match)
- Top scorer(s): Fuad Anwar (Saudi Arabia); Mahmoud Soufi (Qatar) (4 goals each)
- Best player: Mohammed Ali Ghuloum (United Arab Emirates)
- Best goalkeeper: Mohsen Musbah (United Arab Emirates)

The 12th Arabian Gulf Cup (Arabic: كأس الخليج العربي) was the 12th international association football championship for the national teams of the Arabian Peninsula and bordering the Persian Gulf. Hosted by the United Arab Emirates, the competition ran from 3 to 16 November 1994 and was contested by the national teams of Bahrain, Kuwait, Oman, Qatar, Saudi Arabia and the United Arab Emirates.

Played as a round-robin tournament, Saudi Arabia were crowned champions of the competition after defeating Kuwait 2–0 in their final match.

== Background ==
The first edition of the biennial Arabian Gulf Cup was held in Isa Town, Bahrain in 1970. Qatar were the defending champions after winning the previous edition as hosts in 1992. Kuwait were the most successful team in the history of the competition having won the trophy on seven previous occasions.

== Format ==
The six teams contested a single round robin group. After every team had played each other, the team with the most points would be the winner.

=== Participants ===
- Bahrain
- Kuwait
- Oman
- Qatar
- Saudi Arabia
- United Arab Emirates

== Venue ==
All matches were played at the Zayed Sports City Stadium in Abu Dhabi, United Arab Emirates.

== Summary ==
The competition began on 3 November 1994 when hosts the United Arab Emirates defeated Qatar 2–0. The following day, Bahrain and Saudi Arabia recorded wins against Kuwait and Oman respectively.

Saudi Arabia went into the final round of matches with a one-point lead over the United Arab Emirates. Kuwait – Saudi Arabia's final opponents – had suspended nine players ahead of the match on 16 November for ignoring instructions from officials. The players would subsequently be banned for three months. Saudi Arabia won the match 2–0 to win the competition.

== Table ==
| Team | Pld | W | D | L | GF | GA | GD | Pts |
|---|---|---|---|---|---|---|---|---|
| Saudi Arabia | 5 | 4 | 1 | 0 | 10 | 4 | +6 | 9 |
| United Arab Emirates | 5 | 3 | 2 | 0 | 7 | 1 | +6 | 8 |
| Bahrain | 5 | 1 | 3 | 1 | 5 | 6 | –1 | 5 |
| Qatar | 5 | 1 | 1 | 3 | 6 | 8 | –2 | 3 |
| Kuwait | 5 | 1 | 1 | 3 | 2 | 6 | –4 | 3 |
| Oman | 5 | 0 | 2 | 3 | 4 | 9 | –5 | 2 |
