= Said Al-Ruzaiqi =

Omani footballer (born 1986)

Personal information
- Full name: Said Salim Al-Ruzaiqi
- Date of birth: 12 December 1986 (age 39)
- Place of birth: Sur, Oman
- Height: 1.80 m (5 ft 11 in)
- Position: Striker

Youth career
- 2002–2006: Al-Tali'aa

Senior career*
Years	Team	Apps	(Gls)
2006–2009	Al-Tali'aa	29	(17)
2009–2010	Muscat	7	(3)
2010–2011	Al-Tali'aa	16	(5)
2011–2013	Sur	17	(8)
2013–2014	Al-Oruba	22	(8)
2014–2018	Al-Nahda	8	(2)
2018	Al Arabi SC	14	(9)
2018–2019	Al-Ta'ee	10	(2)
2019–2020	Fanja		
2020–2021	Sohar		
2021–	Al-Nasr		

International career
2014–2019	Oman	24	(8)
- * Club domestic league appearances and goals

Said Salim Al-Ruzaiqi (Arabic: سعيد سالم الرزيقي; born 12 December 1986), commonly known as Said Al-Ruzaiqi or Al-Shalhoub, is an Oman international footballer who plays as a striker.

== Club career ==
On 1 September 2014, he signed a one-year contract with 2013–14 Oman Professional League winners Al-Nahda Club.

== International career ==
Said is part of the first team squad of the Oman national football team. He was selected for the national team for the first time in 2014. He made his first appearance for Oman on 17 November 2014 in the 22nd Arabian Gulf Cup in the match against Iraq, and scored his first goal on 20 November 2014 in a 5−0 win against Kuwait in the same tournament. It was just his second international match for Oman, and he impressed many with his scoring abilities by netting two more goals in the match, thus becoming the first and the only player in the 22nd Arabian Gulf Cup to score a hat-trick. He played his first full match for Oman on 25 November 2014 in the Third place play-off of the 22nd Arabian Gulf Cup in a 1−0 loss against the United Arab Emirates.

== Career statistics ==
=== Club ===
Club	Season	Division	League		Cup		Continental		Other		Total	
Club	Season	Division	Apps	Goals	Apps	Goals	Apps	Goals	Apps	Goals	Apps	Goals
Al-Tali'aa	2006–07	Omani League	-	2	-	0	0	0	0	0	-	2
Al-Tali'aa	2007–08	Omani League	-	2	-	0	0	0	0	0	-	2
Al-Tali'aa	2008–09	Omani League	-	13	-	0	0	0	0	0	-	13
Al-Tali'aa	Total		-	17	-	0	0	0	0	0	-	17
Muscat	2009–10	Omani League	-	3	-	0	0	0	0	0	-	3
Muscat	Total		-	3	-	0	0	0	0	0	-	3
Al-Tali'aa	2010–11	Omani League	-	5	-	0	0	0	0	0	-	5
Al-Tali'aa	Total		-	5	-	0	0	0	0	0	-	5
Sur	2011–12	Oman Elite League	-	4	-	2	0	0	0	0	-	6
Sur	2012–13	Oman Elite League	-	4	-	2	0	0	0	0	-	6
Sur	Total		-	8	-	4	0	0	0	0	-	12
Al-Oruba	2013–14	Oman Professional League	-	8	-	0	0	0	0	0	-	8
Al-Oruba	Total		-	8	-	0	0	0	0	0	-	8
Al-Nahda	2014–15	Oman Professional League	-	2	-	0	0	0	0	0	-	2
Al-Nahda	Total		-	2	-	0	0	0		0	-	2
Al Arabi SC	2017–18	Kuwaiti Premier League	12	6	3	0	0	0	2	1	17	7
Career total			-	48	-	4	0	0	3	1	-	53

=== International ===
Scores and results list Oman's goal tally first.

#	Date	Venue	Opponent	Score	Result	Competition
1.	20 November 2014	Prince Faisal bin Fahd Stadium, Riyadh, Saudi Arabia	Kuwait	2–0	5–0	22nd Arabian Gulf Cup
2.	20 November 2014	Prince Faisal bin Fahd Stadium, Riyadh, Saudi Arabia	Kuwait	3–0	5–0	22nd Arabian Gulf Cup
3.	20 November 2014	Prince Faisal bin Fahd Stadium, Riyadh, Saudi Arabia	Kuwait	4–0	5–0	22nd Arabian Gulf Cup
4.	11 October 2016	Sultan Qaboos Sports Complex, Muscat, Oman	Bahrain	2–2	2–2	Friendly
5.	30 August 2017	Sultan Qaboos Sports Complex, Muscat, Oman	Afghanistan	2–0	2–0	Friendly
6.	14 November 2017	Changlimithang Stadium, Thimphu, Bhutan	Bhutan	4–1	4–2	2019 AFC Asian Cup qualification
7.	28 December 2017	Al Kuwait Sports Club Stadium, Kuwait City, Kuwait	Saudi Arabia	1–0	2–0	23rd Arabian Gulf Cup
8.	28 December 2017	Al Kuwait Sports Club Stadium, Kuwait City, Kuwait	Saudi Arabia	2–0	2–0	23rd Arabian Gulf Cup
