= Doha Sports Stadium =

Doha Stadium استاد الدوحة الرياضي
- Interactive map of Doha Stadium استاد الدوحة الرياضي
- Location: Doha, Qatar
- Coordinates: 25°17′03″N 51°32′26″E
- Capacity: 2,000
- Surface: Grass

Construction
- Built: 1962; 64 years ago

Doha Sports Stadium (Arabic: استاد الدوحة الرياضي) is the first football stadium in the Arabian Gulf region with a grass pitch, established in 1962. It is located in Doha near the Doha Corniche. It officially opened in 1962, though there were non-professional matches being played in it since the 1950s.

The most notable match in this stadium was a friendly match in 1973 between Pelé's Santos FC and the Qatari team Al Ahli. Minor football matches are still held at the stadium, such as youth games and amateur competitions, among which are the Asian Communities Football Tournament and the Qatar Amateur League (QAL).
