= Saoud Fath =

Qatari footballer (born 1980)

Saoud Fath Al Katheiri
Personal information
- Date of birth: 16 August 1980 (age 46)
- Place of birth: Qatar
- Position: Defender

Senior career*
Years	Team	Apps	(Gls)
2000–2002	Al Ittihad	-	(-)
2002–2003	Rapid Wien	5	(0)
2003–2007	Al-Gharrafa		
2006	→ Al Sadd SC (loan)	-	(-)

International career
1997–2004	Qatar	40	(0)
- * Club domestic league appearances and goals

Saoud Fath Al Katheiri is a Qatar football defender who played for Qatar in the 2000 Asian Cup. He also played for Al Gharrafa, Al Ittihad and Rapid Wien.
