= Fayad Mahmoud =

Bahraini footballer

Personal information
- Full name: Fayad Mahmoud Hissain
- Place of birth: Bahrain
- Position: Defender

International career
Years	Team	Apps	(Gls)
1988–1990	Bahrain		(2)

Fayad Mahmoud Hissain is a Bahraini football defender who played for Bahrain in the Asian Cup.
