= Saad Al-Dosari =

Saudi Arabian footballer

Saad Al-Dosari سعد الدوسري
Personal information
- Full name: Saad Abdullah Al-Dosari
- Date of birth: 17 June 1977
- Place of birth: Wadi ad-Dawasir, Saudi Arabia
- Date of death: 30 December 2004 (aged 27)
- Place of death: Al-Hasa, Saudi Arabia
- Height: 1.69 m (5 ft 6 1/2 in)

Senior career*
Years	Team	Apps	(Gls)
1997–2001	Al-Riyadh SC		
2001–2003	Al-Ahli SC (Jeddah)		
2003–2004	Al-Hilal		

International career
1998–2004	Saudi Arabia	26	(0)
- * Club domestic league appearances and goals

Saad Al-Dosari (17 June 1977 – 30 December 2004) was a Saudi Arabian football midfielder who played for Saudi Arabia in the 2004 AFC Asian Cup.

== Death ==
On 30 December 2004 Al-Dosari died as a result of a car accident in Al-Hasa in the Eastern Province, Saudi Arabia.
