= 1998 Arab Cup =

7th Arab Cup, held in Qatar

1998 Arab Cup كأس العرب 1998
Tournament details
- Host country: Qatar
- Dates: 22 September – 1 October
- Teams: 12 (from 2 confederations)
- Venues: 2 (in 1 host city)

Final positions
- Champions: Saudi Arabia (1st title)
- Runners-up: Qatar
- Third place: Kuwait
- Fourth place: United Arab Emirates

Tournament statistics
- Matches played: 16
- Goals scored: 52 (3.25 per match)
- Top scorer(s): (Saudi Arabia) Obeid Al-Dosari (8 goals)
- Best player(s): (Kuwait) Bader Haji (Qatar) Mubarak Mustafa
- Best goalkeeper: (Saudi Arabia) Mohamed Al-Deayea

The 1998 Arab Cup was the seventh edition of the Arab Cup hosted by Qatar, in the city of Doha. Saudi Arabia won their first title.

== Qualifying ==
The 12 qualified teams are:

Participants
Zone	Team
Hosts	Qatar
Holders	Egypt (Note: Under-23 Olympic Team was representing Country)
Zone 1 (Gulf Area)	Kuwait
Zone 1 (Gulf Area)	United Arab Emirates
Zone 2 (Red Sea)	Sudan
Zone 3 (North Africa)	Algeria
Zone 3 (North Africa)	Libya
Zone 4 (East Region)	Lebanon
Zone 4 (East Region)	Jordan
Zone 4 (East Region)	Syria
World Cup qualifiers	Morocco
World Cup qualifiers	Saudi Arabia

== Venues ==
Al Rayyan (Doha Area)		1998 Arab Cup is located in Qatar
Khalifa International Stadium	Jassim bin Hamad Stadium	1998 Arab Cup is located in Qatar
Capacity: 40,000	Capacity: 13,000	1998 Arab Cup is located in Qatar

== Overview ==
Algeria, Egypt and Morocco did not send their senior national teams but instead sent their Under-23 teams to the competition.

== Group stage ==
=== Group A ===
Team	Pld	W	D	L	GF	GA	GD	Pts
Qatar	2	2	0	0	4	1	+3	6
Jordan	2	1	0	1	2	3	−1	3
Libya	2	0	0	2	2	4	−2	0

22 September 1998

Qatar	2–1	Libya
Khamis 44'; Mustafa 49'		Ramadan 43'

Jassim bin Hamad Stadium, Doha
Attendance: 20,000
Referee: Mohamed Koussa (Syria)

24 September 1998

Libya	1–2	Jordan
El-Masli 61'		Al-Sheikh 36'; Ali 64'

Jassim bin Hamad Stadium, Doha
Attendance: 4,000
Referee: Salah Ahmed (Sudan)

26 September 1998

Qatar	2–0	Jordan
Mustafa 17'; Khamis 69'

Jassim bin Hamad Stadium, Doha
Attendance: 20,000
Referee: Qassem Hamza (Kuwait)

=== Group B ===
Team	Pld	W	D	L	GF	GA	GD	Pts
Kuwait	2	2	0	0	8	1	+7	6
Egypt	2	1	0	1	3	5	−2	3
Syria	2	0	0	2	1	6	−5	0

22 September 1998

Egypt	2–1	Syria
Rajab 37'; Al-Doumani 44'		Mahmalji 67'

Jassim bin Hamad Stadium, Doha
Attendance: 15,000
Referee: Omar Al-Mehanna (Saudi Arabia)

24 September 1998

Egypt	1–4	Kuwait
Al-Doumani 25'		Al Houwaidi 4'; Mubarak 19'; Haji 85' (pen.); Abdullah 90'

Jassim bin Hamad Stadium, Doha
Attendance: 15,000
Referee: Hicham Guirat (Tunisia)

26 September 1998

Kuwait	4–0	Syria
Al Houwaidi 10'; Abdullah 23'; Al-Saleh 35'; Bakhit 57'

Jassim bin Hamad Stadium, Doha
Attendance: 7,000
Referee: Salah Ahmed (Sudan)

=== Group C ===
Team	Pld	W	D	L	GF	GA	GD	Pts
United Arab Emirates	2	1	0	1	4	2	+2	3
Morocco	2	1	0	1	2	2	0	3
Sudan	2	1	0	1	3	5	−2	3

23 September 1998

Morocco	1–0	United Arab Emirates
Termina 86'

Jassim bin Hamad Stadium, Doha
Attendance: 5,000
Referee: Qassem Hamza (Kuwait)

25 September 1998

Morocco	1–2	Sudan
Sektioui 25'		Anas 42', 45'

Jassim bin Hamad Stadium, Doha
Attendance: 13,000
Referee: Qassem Hamza (Kuwait)

27 September 1998

United Arab Emirates	4–1	Sudan
Saeed 13'; Obaid 83' (pen.), 88' (pen.); Hassan 90'		Jafar 68'

Jassim bin Hamad Stadium, Doha
Attendance: 15,000
Referee: Omar Al-Mehanna (Saudi Arabia)

=== Group D ===
Team	Pld	W	D	L	GF	GA	GD	Pts
Saudi Arabia	2	2	0	0	7	1	+6	6
Lebanon	2	0	1	1	1	4	−3	1
Algeria	2	0	1	1	0	3	−3	1

23 September 1998

Algeria	0–0	Lebanon

Jassim bin Hamad Stadium, Doha
Attendance: 5,000
Referee: Juma'a Al-Ali (Qatar)

25 September 1998

Saudi Arabia	3–0	Algeria
Al-Dosari 8', 90'; Suwayed 54'

Jassim bin Hamad Stadium, Doha
Attendance: 10,000
Referee: Abdulaziz Al-Mulla (United Arab Emirates)

27 September 1998

Saudi Arabia	4–1	Lebanon
Al-Dosari 28', 38', 77'; Al-Temyat 82'		Al-Indari 88'

Jassim bin Hamad Stadium, Doha
Attendance: 13,000
Referee: Juma'a Al-Ali (Qatar)

== Knockout stage ==
Semi-finals
29 September 1998 – Doha (JBHS)
Saudi Arabia	2
Kuwait	1
29 September 1998 – Doha (JBHS)
Qatar	2
United Arab Emirates	1

Final
1 October 1998 – Doha (KIS)
Saudi Arabia	3
Qatar	1
Third place
1 October 1998 – Doha (KIS)
Kuwait	4
United Arab Emirates	1

=== Semi-finals ===
29 September 1998

Saudi Arabia	2–1	Kuwait
Al-Thunayan 65'; Al-Temawi 79'		Youssouf 3'

Jassim bin Hamad Stadium, Doha
Attendance: 20,000
Referee: Hicham Guirat (Tunisia)

29 September 1998

Qatar	2–1	United Arab Emirates
Nazmi 65'; Al-Kowari 75'		Hassan 60'

Jassim bin Hamad Stadium, Doha
Attendance: 20,000
Referee: Mohamed Koussa (Syria)

=== Third place play-off ===
1 October 1998

Kuwait	4–1	United Arab Emirates
Haji 41' (pen.); Abdullah 67', 87', 90'		Ali 26'

Khalifa International Stadium, Doha
Attendance: 25,000
Referee: Mourad Bendada (Algeria)

=== Final ===
1 October 1998

Saudi Arabia	3–1	Qatar
Al-Dosari 28', 49', 64'		Mustafa 82'

Khalifa International Stadium, Doha
Attendance: 25,000
Referee: Hicham Guirat (Tunisia)

== Result ==
1998 Arab Cup winners

Saudi Arabia
1st title

== Awards ==
Top Scorer:

- (Saudi Arabia) Obeid Al-Dosari (8 goals)

Most Valuable Player:

- (Kuwait) Badr Haji
- (Qatar) Mubarak Mustafa

Best Goalkeeper:

- (Saudi Arabia) Mohammed Al-Deayea
