= Ahmed Khalil Al-Khaldi =

Qatari footballer (born 1972)

Personal information
- Full name: Ahmed Khalil Saleh Al-Khaldi
- Date of birth: 17 October 1972 (age 54)
- Place of birth: Doha, Qatar
- Position: Goalkeeper

International career
Years	Team	Apps	(Gls)
1992–2003	Qatar	45	(0)

Ahmed Khalil Al-Khaldi (born 17 October 1972) is a Qatari footballer. He competed in the men's tournament at the 1992 Summer Olympics.
