= 6th Arabian Gulf Cup =

International football tournament in 1982

1982 Arabian Gulf Cup
دورة كأس الخليج العربي السادسة (in Arabic)

Tournament details
- Host country: United Arab Emirates
- Dates: 19 March – 4 April
- Teams: 6 (1 withdrew)
- Venue: 1 (in 1 host city)

Final positions
- Champions: Kuwait (5th title)
- Runners-up: Bahrain
- Third place: United Arab Emirates
- Fourth place: Saudi Arabia

Tournament statistics
- Matches played: 15
- Goals scored: 38 (2.53 per match)
- Top scorer(s): (Bahrain) Ibrahim Zowayed (United Arab Emirates) Salem Khalifa (Saudi Arabia) Majed Abdullah (Kuwait) Yussef Al-Suwayed (3 goals each)
- Best goalkeeper: (United Arab Emirates) Saeed Salbukh

The 6th Arabian Gulf Cup (Arabic: دورة كأس الخليج العربي السادسة) was the sixth international association football championship for the national teams of the Arabian Peninsula and bordering the Persian Gulf. Hosted by the United Arab Emirates, the competition ran from 19 March to 4 April 1982 and was contested by the national teams of Bahrain, Kuwait, Oman, Qatar, Saudi Arabia and the United Arab Emirates.

Iraq withdrew partway through the competition and their record was annulled. Played as a round-robin tournament, Kuwait were crowned champions of the competition after Bahrain and Saudi Arabia drew 2–2 in the penultimate match.

== Background ==
The first edition of the biennial Arabian Gulf Cup was held in Isa Town, Bahrain in 1970. Iraq were the defending champions after winning the previous edition as hosts in 1979. Kuwait were the most successful team in the history of the competition having won the trophy on four previous occasions.

== Format ==
The six teams contested a single round robin group. After every team had played each other, the team with the most points would be the winner.

=== Participants ===
- Bahrain
- Kuwait
- Oman
- Qatar
- Saudi Arabia
- United Arab Emirates

== Venue ==
Matches were played at the Zayed Sports City Stadium in Abu Dhabi, United Arab Emirates.

== Summary ==
The competition began on 19 March 1982 when hosts the United Arab Emirates defeated Qatar 1–0. The following day, Kuwait and Iraq recorded wins against Bahrain and Oman respectively.

On the orders of the president of Iraq, Saddam Hussein, Iraq withdrew from the competition ahead of their potentially decisive final match against Kuwait on 1 April. Iraq were top of the standings at the time and the reason for the withdrawal has never been disclosed. Had Iraq defeated Kuwait, they would have won the competition. Instead, their results were annulled and Kuwait were crowned champions after a 2–2 draw between Saudi Arabia and Bahrain in the penultimate match of the competition gave them an unassailable lead.

== Table ==
Team	Pld	W	D	L	GF	GA	GD	Pts
Kuwait	5	4	0	1	8	2	+6	8
Bahrain	5	3	1	1	10	7	+3	7
United Arab Emirates	5	3	0	2	7	6	+1	6
Saudi Arabia	5	2	1	2	6	4	+2	5
Qatar	5	2	0	3	5	11	-6	4
Oman	5	0	0	5	2	15	−13	0

== Matches ==
19 March 1982

United Arab Emirates	1–0	Qatar
Khamees 30'

Zayed Sports City Stadium, Abu Dhabi
20 March 1982

Kuwait	2–0	Bahrain
Al-Suwayed 60', 72'

Zayed Sports City Stadium, Abu Dhabi
20 March 1982

Iraq	4–0 (annulled)	Oman
Saeed 24'; Dirjal 32', 90'; Farhan 75'

Zayed Sports City Stadium, Abu Dhabi

21 March 1982

United Arab Emirates	1–0	Saudi Arabia
Khalifa 49'

Zayed Sports City Stadium, Abu Dhabi
22 March 1982

Qatar	3–0	Oman
Bilal 31'; Afifa 43'; Muftah 56'

Zayed Sports City Stadium, Abu Dhabi
22 March 1982

Iraq	3–0 (annulled)	Bahrain
Aziz 41'; Saeed 84', 88'

Zayed Sports City Stadium, Abu Dhabi

24 March 1982

Kuwait	2–0	United Arab Emirates
Al-Suwayed 52'; Al-Anbari 63'

Zayed Sports City Stadium, Abu Dhabi
24 March 1982

Iraq	1–1 (annulled)	Saudi Arabia
Saeed 84'		Al-Saghir 14'

Zayed Sports City Stadium, Abu Dhabi
25 March 1982

Bahrain	4–1	Oman
Sharida 18'; Zwayed 40'; Abduljalil 67'; Boushkar 72'		Hamdan 21'

Zayed Sports City Stadium, Abu Dhabi

26 March 1982

Kuwait	1–0	Saudi Arabia
Al-Haddad 88'

Zayed Sports City Stadium, Abu Dhabi
26 March 1982

Iraq	2–1 (annulled)	Qatar
Mohammed 20', 29'		Muftah 60' (pen.)

Zayed Sports City Stadium, Abu Dhabi
27 March 1982

Bahrain	3–2	United Arab Emirates
Shuwair 42'; Zwayed 46'; Mohammad 77'		Khalifa 9'; Hadid 83'

Zayed Sports City Stadium, Abu Dhabi

29 March 1982

Kuwait	2–0	Oman
Al-Mawash 47'; Al-Hashash 54'

Zayed Sports City Stadium, Abu Dhabi
29 March 1982

Saudi Arabia	1–0	Qatar
Abdullah 68' (pen.)

Zayed Sports City Stadium, Abu Dhabi
29 March 1982

Iraq	1–0 (annulled)	United Arab Emirates
Saeed 49'

Zayed Sports City Stadium, Abu Dhabi

31 March 1982

Saudi Arabia	3–0	Oman
Hamdan 6'; Farhan 28'; Marzouq 84'

Zayed Sports City Stadium, Abu Dhabi
31 March 1982

Bahrain	1–0	Qatar
Zwayed 74'

Zayed Sports City Stadium, Abu Dhabi
1 April 1982

Iraq	Not played	Kuwait

Zayed Sports City Stadium, Abu Dhabi

2 April 1982

United Arab Emirates	3–1	Oman
Hamdoun 11'; Khamees 46'; Khalifa 60'		Juman 83'

Zayed Sports City Stadium, Abu Dhabi
2 April 1982

Saudi Arabia	2–2	Bahrain
Abdullah 42', 75'		Sharida 1'; Mohammed 50'

Zayed Sports City Stadium, Abu Dhabi
4 April 1982

Qatar	2–1	Kuwait
Salman 39'; Al-Qadi 79'		Al-Ghanem 63'

Zayed Sports City Stadium, Abu Dhabi
