= Mahmoud Soufi =

Qatari footballer (1971–2019)

Personal information
- Full name: Mahmoud Yassen Soufi
- Date of birth: 20 October 1971
- Place of birth: Mogadishu, Somalia
- Date of death: 2 June 2019 (aged 47)
- Place of death: Qatar
- Height: 1.80 m (5 ft 11 in)
- Position: Striker

Senior career*
Years	Team	Apps	(Gls)
1984–1997	Al-Gharafa		
1997–1998	Al Sadd SC	15	(5)
1998–2001	Al-Arabi		
2001–2002	Muaither SC	6	(0)

International career
1988–1999	Qatar	83	(31)
- * Club domestic league appearances and goals

Mahmoud Soufi (Arabic: محمود صوفي ياسين دعالة), was a naturalized Qatari football footballer who played for Al-Gharafa in the 1980s, and also represented the Qatar national team in the 1980s and 1990s.

== Early life ==
Born in Somalia's capital Mogadishu, Soufi moved to Qatar as a young adult. He was eventually naturalized and chosen to represent the Qatar national team.

== Club career ==
Soufi was originally playing with Al-Ittihad's Basketball team but was recommended to play football by Sheikh Hamad bin Jassim bin Faisal Al Thani. Soufi started playing for Al-Gharafa in the 1984–1985 season, the following season Al-Gharafa SC faced Al Ahli SC in the Sheikh Jassim Cup semi-finals, Soufi arrived late in the second-half, due to this the head coach left the stadium in frustration. When Soufi was substituted on he scored a brace and his teammate also scored to win the match by 3–2. He was tied with his teammate Adel Khamis for the top goal-scorer award in the 1990/1991 season with 8 goals. And again in the 1993/1994 season alongside Ahmed Daham with 9 goals. He moved to Al-Arabi in 1998 and had also played for Al-Sadd and Muaither SC.

== International career ==
Soufi represented the Qatar national team from 1988 to 1999 scoring 31 goals in 83 appearances for the national side. He was selected to play in the 1988 Gulf Cup, He also helped Qatar win their first Arabian Gulf Cup title in 1992 scoring against Kuwait and United Arab Emirates in the tournament. However, after retirement, Soufi had his citizenship rescinded and had to return to Somalia. Soufi was instrumental in World Cup Qualifiers, one of his most memorable moments was the game against China where he scored in the 87' minute, with his teammate Mansour Muftah following a few seconds later to win the game by 2–1. He holds the record for the most goals by a Qatari in the World Cup Qualifiers with 12 goals in 20 matches.

== Legacy ==
Soufi was remembered as an intelligent, tall, and highly skillful player in his playing days. To celebrate him, for the FIFA U-17 World Cup, Aspire Zone Pitch 8 was selected to be named after him.

== Death ==
Soufi died on 2 June 2019.

== Honours ==
=== Club ===
- Al-Gharafa
  - Qatar Stars League: 1991–92, 1997–98
  - Qatari Second Division: 1986–87
  - Emir of Qatar Cup: 1994–95, 1995–96, 1996–97, 1997–98
- Al-Sadd
  - Sheikh Jassim Cup: 1997
  - Qatar Cup: 1998

=== Individual ===
- Top goal-scorer: 1990–91, 1993–94
