= 11th Arabian Gulf Cup =

International football tournament in 1992

Tournament details
- Host country: Qatar
- Dates: 27 November – 10 December
- Venue: 1 (in 1 host city)

Final positions
- Champions: Qatar (1st title)

Tournament statistics
- Matches played: 15
- Goals scored: 30 (2 per match)
- Top scorer: (Qatar) Mubarak Mustafa (3 goals)
- Best player: (Qatar) Mubarak Mustafa
- Best goalkeeper: (Qatar) Ahmed Khalil

The 11th Arabian Gulf Cup (Arabic: كأس الخليج العربي) was the 11th international association football championship for the national teams of the Arabian Peninsula and bordering the Persian Gulf. Hosted by Qatar, the competition ran from 27 November to 10 December 1992 and was contested by the national teams of Bahrain, Kuwait, Oman, Qatar, Saudi Arabia and the United Arab Emirates.

Played as a round-robin tournament, Qatar were crowned champions of the competition after defeating the United Arab Emirates 1–0 in their penultimate match.

== Background ==
The first edition of the biennial Arabian Gulf Cup was held in Isa Town, Bahrain in 1970. Kuwait were the defending champions after winning the previous edition as hosts in 1990. Kuwait were also the most successful team in the history of the competition having won the trophy on seven previous occasions.

Following the Iraqi invasion of Kuwait in August 1990 at the start of the Gulf War, Iraq were excluded from the tournament.

== Format ==
The six teams contested a single round robin group. After every team had played each other, the team with the most points would be the winner.

=== Participants ===
- Bahrain
- Kuwait
- Oman
- Qatar
- Saudi Arabia
- United Arab Emirates

== Venue ==
Matches were played at the Khalifa International Stadium in Al Rayyan and the Hamad bin Khalifa Stadium in Doha.

== Summary ==
The competition began on 27 November 1992 when hosts Qatar defeated Oman 2–0. The following day, Kuwait and Bahrain recorded wins against the United Arab Emirates and Saudi Arabia respectively.

Qatar were crowned champions on 6 December after they defeated the United Arab Emirates 1–0 in their penultimate match to move four points clear at the top of the standings with just one round of matches remaining.

== Table ==
Team	Pld	W	D	L	GF	GA	GD	Pts
Qatar	5	4	0	1	8	1	+7	8
Bahrain	5	3	0	2	6	4	+2	6
Saudi Arabia	5	3	0	2	6	4	+2	6
United Arab Emirates	5	3	0	2	4	3	+1	6
Kuwait	5	2	0	3	5	8	–3	4
Oman	5	0	0	5	1	10	–9	0
