= 10th Arabian Gulf Cup =

International football tournament in 1990

Tournament details
- Host country: Kuwait
- Dates: 21 February – 9 March
- Teams: 5
- Venue: 1 (in 1 host city)

Final positions
- Champions: Kuwait (7th title)
- Runners-up: Qatar
- Third place: Bahrain
- Fourth place: Oman

Tournament statistics
- Matches played: 10
- Goals scored: 21 (2.1 per match)
- Top scorer: (Kuwait) Mohammed Hajeyah (5 goals)
- Best player: (United Arab Emirates) Nasir Khamees

The 10th Arabian Gulf Cup (Arabic: كأس الخليج العربي) was held in Kuwait, between 21 February to 9 March 1990. All matches were played at Peace & Friendship Stadium.

Saudi Arabia withdrew before the tournament, as they considered that the horses in the competition logo were a reference to two animals used by the Kuwaitis in the Battle of Jahra in 1920. Iraq also withdrew while the tournament was still running, complaining about the referee in their tie with the UAE.

== Matches ==
Team	Pts	Pld	W	D	L	GF	GA	GD
Kuwait	7	4	3	1	0	10	2	+8
Qatar	4	4	1	2	1	4	4	0
Bahrain	4	4	1	2	1	1	1	0
Oman	3	4	0	3	1	4	6	−2
United Arab Emirates	2	4	0	2	2	2	8	−6

21 February 1990

Kuwait	1–0	Bahrain
Sulaiman 10'

Peace & Friendship Stadium, Kuwait City
Attendance: 10,000

22 February 1990

United Arab Emirates	1–1	Oman
Khamis 58'		Hamoud 29'

Peace & Friendship Stadium, Kuwait City
Attendance: 8,000

23 February 1990

Qatar	0–0	Bahrain

Peace & Friendship Stadium, Kuwait City
Attendance: 6,500

25 February 1990

Kuwait	1–1	Oman
Al-Haddad 60'		Khalifa 52'

Peace & Friendship Stadium, Kuwait City
Attendance: 15,000

27 February 1990

Qatar	0–0	United Arab Emirates

Peace & Friendship Stadium, Kuwait City
Attendance: 10,000

1 March 1990

Bahrain	0–0	Oman

Peace & Friendship Stadium, Kuwait City
Attendance: 6,000

4 March 1990

Qatar	4–2	Oman
Khamis 47'; Muftah 49', 66'; Soufi 83'		Humaid 4' (pen.); Abduannour 59'

Peace & Friendship Stadium, Kuwait City

5 March 1990

Bahrain	1–0	United Arab Emirates
Mahmoud 47' (pen.)

Peace & Friendship Stadium, Kuwait City

7 March 1990

Kuwait	2–0	Qatar
Badiyh 24'; Hajeyah 61'

Peace & Friendship Stadium, Kuwait City

9 March 1990

Kuwait	6–1	United Arab Emirates
Hajeyah 13', 42', 50', 55'; Al-Haddad 40'; Nassar 86'		Bakheet 73'

Peace & Friendship Stadium, Kuwait City

Annulled games

26 February 1990

Iraq	1–0	Bahrain
Jafar 39'

Peace & Friendship Stadium, Kuwait City
Attendance: 7,000

28 February 1990

Iraq	1–1	Kuwait
Hussein 67'		Sulaiman 48'

Peace & Friendship Stadium, Kuwait City

3 March 1990

Iraq	2–2	United Arab Emirates
Radhi 25'; Qais 88' (pen.)		Khamees 6'; Al-Talyani 43' (pen.)

Peace & Friendship Stadium, Kuwait City

== Result ==
10th Arabian Gulf Cup winners

Kuwait
Seventh title
