= 9th Arabian Gulf Cup =

International football tournament in 1988

1988 9th Arabian Gulf Cup
كأس الخليج العربي التاسعة

Tournament details
- Host country: Saudi Arabia
- Dates: 2–18 March
- Teams: 6 (from 1 confederation)
- Venue: 1 (in 1 host city)

Final positions
- Champions: Iraq (3rd title)
- Runners-up: United Arab Emirates
- Third place: Saudi Arabia
- Fourth place: Bahrain

Tournament statistics
- Matches played: 21
- Goals scored: 34 (1.62 per match)
- Top scorer(s): (Iraq) Ahmed Radhi (United Arab Emirates) Zuhair Bakheet (4 goals each)
- Best player: (Iraq) Habib Jafar
- Best goalkeeper: (Oman) Yousif Obaid

The 9th Arabian Gulf Cup (Arabic: كأس الخليج العربي) was the 9th edition of this tournament. It was held from 2 to 18 March 1988, in Saudi Arabia. It was the second time after 1972 that Saudi Arabia hosted this regional football tournament. The tournament was won by Iraq. It was the third title for Iraq after having won the tournament 1979 in Baghdad and 1984 in Muscat.

All games were played at the newly built King Fahd International Stadium in Riyadh. The stadium was built to host the 1988 Gulf Cup and the FIFA World Youth Championship one year later.

Having scored four goals each, Ahmed Radhi from Iraq and Zuhair Bakheet from the UAE shared the top-scorer award. Habib Jaafar (Iraq) was voted as best player, Oman's goalkeeper Yousif Obaid won the best-goalkeeper-award.

Oman achieved their first victory in the Gulf Cup tournament after beating Qatar 2–1. Before so, the Oman had failed to win a single match in the 14 years prior.

== Matches ==
Team	Pts	Pld	W	D	L	GF	GA	GD
Iraq	10	6	4	2	0	8	1	+7
United Arab Emirates	8	6	3	2	1	7	4	+3
Saudi Arabia	7	6	2	3	1	5	4	+1
Bahrain	6	6	3	0	3	4	4	0
Kuwait	4	6	1	2	3	3	4	−1
Qatar	4	6	1	2	3	4	8	−4
Oman	3	6	1	1	4	3	9	−6

March 2, 1988

Saudi Arabia	2–0	Oman
Al-Bishi 58'; Jazaa 84'

King Fahd International Stadium, Riyadh

March 3, 1988

Kuwait	1 – 1	Qatar

King Fahd International Stadium, Riyadh

March 3, 1988

United Arab Emirates	2 – 0	Bahrain

King Fahd International Stadium, Riyadh

March 4, 1988

Iraq	1 – 1	Oman
Shihab 50'		Nasser Hamdan 36'

King Fahd International Stadium, Riyadh

March 5, 1988

Saudi Arabia	0 – 0	Qatar

King Fahd International Stadium, Riyadh

March 5, 1988

United Arab Emirates	1 – 0	Kuwait

King Fahd International Stadium, Riyadh

March 7, 1988

Bahrain	2 – 0	Oman

King Fahd International Stadium, Riyadh

March 8, 1988

Qatar	2 – 1	United Arab Emirates
Salman 35' Soufi 58'		Mohamed

King Fahd International Stadium, Riyadh

March 8, 1988

Iraq	1 – 0	Kuwait
Radhi 39'

King Fahd International Stadium, Riyadh

March 9, 1988

Saudi Arabia	1 – 0	Bahrain
Majed Abdullah 80'

King Fahd International Stadium, Riyadh

March 10, 1988

United Arab Emirates	0 – 0	Iraq

King Fahd International Stadium, Riyadh

March 10, 1988

Oman	2 – 1	Qatar
Younis 51' (pen.) Khamis 69'		Muftah 73'

King Fahd International Stadium, Riyadh

March 12, 1988

Bahrain	1 – 0	Kuwait

King Fahd International Stadium, Riyadh

March 13, 1988

Iraq	3 – 0	Qatar
Jafar 58'; Radhi 80' 81'

King Fahd International Stadium, Riyadh

March 13, 1988

Saudi Arabia	2 – 2	United Arab Emirates

King Fahd International Stadium, Riyadh

March 14, 1988

Kuwait	2 – 0	Oman

King Fahd International Stadium, Riyadh

March 16, 1988

Iraq	2 – 0	Saudi Arabia
Radhi 59'; Gorgis 72'

King Fahd International Stadium, Riyadh

March 16, 1988

Bahrain	1 – 0	Qatar

King Fahd International Stadium, Riyadh

March 17, 1988

United Arab Emirates	1 – 0	Oman

King Fahd International Stadium, Riyadh

March 18, 1988

Saudi Arabia	0 – 0	Kuwait

King Fahd International Stadium, Riyadh

March 18, 1988

Iraq	1 – 0	Bahrain
Hussein 49'

King Fahd International Stadium, Riyadh

== Result ==
9th Arabian Gulf Cup winners

Iraq
Third title
