= Qatar national football team results (1970–1999) =

This article provides details of international football games played by the Qatar national football team from 1970 to 1999.

== Results ==
Key
Win
Draw
Defeat

=== 1970 ===
27 March 1st Arabian Gulf Cup	Bahrain	2–1	Qatar	Isa Town, Bahrain
16:00 UTC+3	Zuleikh 43'; Salmeen 14'	Report	Faraj 55' (pen.)	Stadium: Isa Town Stadium; Referee: Sobhi Naseer (Egypt)

31 March 1st Arabian Gulf Cup	Kuwait	4–2	Qatar	Isa Town, Bahrain
16:00 UTC+3	Khalaf 25'; Al-Masoud 39'; Sattam 65'; Ibrahim 82'	Report	Ballan 40'; Almas 66' (pen.)	Stadium: Isa Town Stadium; Referee: Abdulrahman Al-Daham (Saudi Arabia)

2 April 1st Arabian Gulf Cup	Saudi Arabia	0–0	Qatar	Isa Town, Bahrain
16:00 UTC+3		Report		Stadium: Isa Town Stadium; Referee: Sobhi Naseer (Egypt)

=== 1972 ===
4 January 1972 Palestine Cup of Nations	Algeria	3–0	Qatar	Baghdad, Iraq
	Tahar 5'; Salhi 33'; Betrouni 53'	Report		Stadium: Al-Shaab Stadium

6 January 1972 Palestine Cup of Nations	Syria	3–2	Qatar	Baghdad, Iraq
		Report		Stadium: Al-Shaab Stadium

8 January 1972 Palestine Cup of Nations	Qatar	1–2	South Yemen	Baghdad, Iraq
		Report		Stadium: Al-Shaab Stadium

10 January 1972 Palestine Cup of Nations	Palestine	7–1	Qatar	Baghdad, Iraq
		Report		Stadium: Al-Shaab Stadium

17 March 2nd Arabian Gulf Cup	United Arab Emirates	1–0	Qatar	Riyadh, Saudi Arabia
16:00 UTC+3	Al-Sawad 22'	Report		Stadium: Youth Welfare Stadium in Al-Malaz; Referee: Jaber Al-Jalahemah (Kuwait)

21 March 2nd Arabian Gulf Cup	Bahrain	6–2	Qatar	Riyadh, Saudi Arabia
16:00 UTC+3	Zuleikh,, Jaknam; Ali; Hamad	Report	Waleed; Awad	Stadium: Youth Welfare Stadium in Al-Malaz; Referee: Jaber Al-Jalahemah (Kuwait)

23 March 2nd Arabian Gulf Cup	Saudi Arabia	4–0	Qatar	Riyadh, Saudi Arabia
16:00 UTC+3	Ghorab 2', 60'; Mousa 39', 73' (pen.)	Report		Stadium: Youth Welfare Stadium in Al-Malaz; Referee: Mohamed Diab Al-Attar (Egypt)

28 March 2nd Arabian Gulf Cup	Qatar	0–5	Kuwait	Riyadh, Saudi Arabia
16:00 UTC+3		Report	Al-Kaabi 8' (o.g.); Al-Mulla 15'; Bouhamad 33', 68'; Shoaib 82'	Stadium: Youth Welfare Stadium in Al-Malaz; Referee: Ibrahim Al-Doy (Bahrain)

=== 1973 ===
5 January Friendly	Kuwait	4–1	Qatar	Kuwait City, Kuwait
--:-- UTC+3

8 January Friendly	Kuwait	9–0	Qatar	Kuwait City, Kuwait
--:-- UTC+3

=== 1974 ===
27 February Friendly	Qatar	0–1	Morocco	Doha, Qatar
--:-- UTC+3				Stadium: Doha Sports Stadium

16 March 3rd Arabian Gulf Cup	Saudi Arabia	2–0	Qatar	Kuwait City, Kuwait
20:00 UTC+3	Al-Mughnem 30'; Bakhit 57'	Report		Stadium: Al Kuwait Sports Club Stadium; Referee: Jaber Al-Jalahemah (Kuwait)

22 March 3rd Arabian Gulf Cup	Qatar	4–0	Oman	Kuwait City, Kuwait
16:00 UTC+3	Saad 7'; Daf'allah 20'; Bashir 55' (pen.); Zain 72'	Report		Stadium: Al Kuwait Sports Club Stadium; Referee: Riccardo Lattanzi (Italy)

24 March 3rd Arabian Gulf Cup	Kuwait	1–0	Qatar	Kuwait City, Kuwait
16:00 UTC+3	Yaqoub 13'	Report		Stadium: Al Kuwait Sports Club Stadium; Referee: Ghazi Kayal (Saudi Arabia)

27 March 3rd Arabian Gulf Cup	Saudi Arabia	3–1	Qatar	Kuwait City, Kuwait
16:00 UTC+3	Abdulmatloub 4'; Ghorab 32'; Al-Mughnem 60'	Report	Ghanim 51'	Stadium: Al Kuwait Sports Club Stadium; Referee: Sami Naji (Iraq)

29 March 3rd Arabian Gulf Cup	United Arab Emirates	1–1 (a.e.t.) (0–3 p)	Qatar	Kuwait City, Kuwait
16:00 UTC+3	Ali 64'	Report	Boshanain 24'	Stadium: Al Kuwait Sports Club Stadium; Referee: Jaber Al-Jalahemah (Kuwait)

=== 1975 ===
21 November 1976 AFC Asian Cup qualification	Iraq	1–0	Qatar	Baghdad, Iraq
	Hassan 55'	Report		Stadium: Al-Shaab Stadium

23 November 1976 AFC Asian Cup qualification	Saudi Arabia	0–1	Qatar	Baghdad, Iraq
		Report	? 8'	Stadium: Al-Shaab Stadium

25 November 1976 AFC Asian Cup qualification	Qatar	2–1	Afghanistan	Baghdad, Iraq
		Report		Stadium: Al-Shaab Stadium

28 November 1976 AFC Asian Cup qualification	Qatar	0–3	Iraq	Baghdad, Iraq
		Report	Alwan 9'; Hassan 60'; Waal 74'	Stadium: Al-Shaab Stadium

30 November 1976 AFC Asian Cup qualification	Qatar	1–2	Saudi Arabia	Baghdad, Iraq
	Alsaieq 7'	Report	Al Mugnim 52'; Bakhit 59'	Stadium: Al-Shaab Stadium

2 December 1976 AFC Asian Cup qualification	Afghanistan	1–1	Qatar	Baghdad, Iraq
		Report		Stadium: Al-Shaab Stadium

=== 1976 ===
26 March 4th Arabian Gulf Cup	Qatar	1–0	Saudi Arabia	Al Rayyan, Qatar
15:25 UTC+3	Almas 20'	Report		Stadium: Khalifa International Stadium; Referee: Sobhi Adeeb (Iraq)

28 March 4th Arabian Gulf Cup	Qatar	0–4	Kuwait	Al Rayyan, Qatar
15:25 UTC+3		Report	Yaqoub 25'; Al-Dakhil 37', 74'; Al-Anberi 46'	Stadium: Khalifa International Stadium; Referee: Sobhi Adeeb (Iraq)

1 April 4th Arabian Gulf Cup	Qatar	3–1	United Arab Emirates	Al Rayyan, Qatar
17:30 UTC+3	Muftah 1'; Al-Hajri 2'; Almas 29'	Report	Abdulrahman 59'	Stadium: Khalifa International Stadium; Referee: Abdulrahman Al-Bakr (Kuwait)

3 April 4th Arabian Gulf Cup	Qatar	0–0	Iraq	Al Rayyan, Qatar
15:25 UTC+3		Report		Stadium: Khalifa International Stadium; Referee: Hédi Saoudi (Tunisia)

7 April 4th Arabian Gulf Cup	Qatar	4–1	Oman	Al Rayyan, Qatar
15:25 UTC+3	Muftah 1', 2'; Almas 3'; Omar 49'	Report	Harib 43'	Stadium: Khalifa International Stadium; Referee: Sobhi Adeeb (Iraq)

10 April 4th Arabian Gulf Cup	Qatar	3–0	Bahrain	Al Rayyan, Qatar
17:30 UTC+3	Muftah 56', 57'; Omar 90'	Report		Stadium: Khalifa International Stadium; Referee: Sobhi Adeeb (Iraq)

=== 1977 ===
8 March Friendly	Qatar	1–0	Tunisia	Al Rayyan, Qatar
--:-- UTC+3				Stadium: Khalifa International Stadium

13 March 1978 FIFA World Cup qualification	Qatar	2–0	Bahrain	Al Rayyan, Qatar
--:-- UTC+3	Muftah 40'; Matter 62'	Report		Stadium: Khalifa International Stadium; Referee: Hungerbühler (Switzerland)

15 March 1978 FIFA World Cup qualification	Qatar	0–2	Kuwait	Al Rayyan, Qatar
--:-- UTC+3		Report	Yaqoub 28'; Al-Anberi 68'	Stadium: Khalifa International Stadium; Referee: Ohmsen (West Germany)

19 March 1978 FIFA World Cup qualification	Qatar	0–3	Bahrain	Al Rayyan, Qatar
--:-- UTC+3		Report	Shaqr 32'; Zowayed 57'; Al Farhan 73' (pen.)	Stadium: Khalifa International Stadium; Referee: Pat Partridge (England)

21 March 1978 FIFA World Cup qualification	Qatar	1–4	Kuwait	Al Rayyan, Qatar
--:-- UTC+3	Abubakr 82' (pen.)	Report	Yaqoub 10'; Ma'yoof 16'; Al Saleh 24'; Bo Hamad 60'	Stadium: Khalifa International Stadium; Referee: Riccardo Lattanzi (Italy)

=== 1978 ===
9 December 1978 Asian Games	Iraq	2–1	Qatar	Bangkok, Thailand
	Subhi 35'; Farhan 90'	Report

11 December 1978 Asian Games	Qatar	2–2	Saudi Arabia	Bangkok, Thailand
	Muftah 67', 68'	Report	Mohammed 14' (o.g.); Al-Saqeer 60'

13 December 1978 Asian Games	China	3–0	Qatar	Bangkok, Thailand
		Report

=== 1979 ===
2 March 1980 AFC Asian Cup qualification	Qatar	3–0	Afghanistan	Dhaka, Bangladesh
	Mattar 20'; Bashir (?); Muftah 90'	Report		Stadium: Dhaka Stadium; Referee: Munir Hossein (Bangladesh)

3 March 1980 AFC Asian Cup qualification	Bangladesh	1–1	Qatar	Dhaka, Bangladesh
	Mohsin 23'	Report	Muftah 58'	Stadium: Dhaka Stadium; Referee: Sultan Najand (Afghanistan)

6 March 1980 AFC Asian Cup qualification	Afghanistan	0–3	Qatar	Dhaka, Bangladesh
		Report	Mattar 49', 61'; Muftah (?)	Stadium: Dhaka Stadium; Referee: Dalil Khan (Bangladesh)

7 March 1980 AFC Asian Cup qualification	Bangladesh	1–3	Qatar	Dhaka, Bangladesh
	Salahuddin 44'	Report	Muftah 11', 51'; Mattar 21'	Stadium: Dhaka Stadium; Referee: Sultan Najand (Afghanistan)

18 March Friendly	Qatar	1–6	Brazil	Al Rayyan, Qatar
--:-- UTC+3		Report		Stadium: Khalifa International Stadium

24 March 5th Arabian Gulf Cup	Kuwait	3–1	Qatar	Baghdad, Iraq
17:00 UTC+3	Al-Suwayed 19'; Al-Buloushi 34', 79'	Report	Mattar 56'	Stadium: Al-Shaab Stadium; Referee: Sivapalan Kathiravale (Malaysia)

27 March 5th Arabian Gulf Cup	Iraq	2–0	Qatar	Baghdad, Iraq
17:00 UTC+3	Saeed 1', 60' (pen.)	Report		Stadium: Al-Shaab Stadium; Referee: Sivapalan Kathiravale (Malaysia)

28 March 5th Arabian Gulf Cup	United Arab Emirates	0–1	Qatar	Baghdad, Iraq
14:30 UTC+3		Report	Muftah 40'	Stadium: Al-Shaab Stadium; Referee: Vijit Getkaew (Thailand)

1 April 5th Arabian Gulf Cup	Qatar	1–0	Oman	Baghdad, Iraq
14:30 UTC+3	Daham 33'	Report		Stadium: Al-Shaab Stadium; Referee: Ahmed Al-Misfer (Kuwait)

4 April 5th Arabian Gulf Cup	Saudi Arabia	7–0	Qatar	Baghdad, Iraq
14:30 UTC+3	Abdullah 14', 15', 45', 48', 55'; Hamdan 32'; Abdoraboh 89'	Report		Stadium: Al-Shaab Stadium; Referee: Alex Vaz (India)

7 April 5th Arabian Gulf Cup	Qatar	1–1	Bahrain	Baghdad, Iraq
14:30 UTC+3	Bashir 27' (pen.)	Report	Shuwaier 77'	Stadium: Al-Shaab Stadium; Referee: Fahad Al-Dahmash (Saudi Arabia)

10 November Friendly	Qatar	1–3	Brazil	Doha, Qatar
--:-- UTC+3	Muftah			Stadium: Hamad bin Khalifa Stadium

12 November Friendly	Qatar	1–3	Brazil	Doha, Qatar
--:-- UTC+3				Stadium: Hamad bin Khalifa Stadium

=== 1980 ===
6 September Friendly	Qatar	0–1	Jordan	Doha, Qatar
--:-- UTC+3		Report		Stadium: Hamad bin Khalifa Stadium

8 September Friendly	Qatar	3–0	Jordan	Doha, Qatar
--:-- UTC+3		Report		Stadium: Hamad bin Khalifa Stadium

17 September 1980 AFC Asian Cup	Qatar	2–1	United Arab Emirates	Kuwait City, Kuwait
--:-- UTC+3	Muftah 4', 15'	Report	Al-Hajri 13'	Attendance: 3,000

19 September 1980 AFC Asian Cup	Qatar	0–2	South Korea	Kuwait City, Kuwait
18:30 UTC+3		Report	Lee Jung-il 5'; Choi Soon-ho 22'	Stadium: Sabah Al-Salem Stadium; Attendance: 9,000; Referee: Vichai Charupunt (Thailand)

23 September 1980 AFC Asian Cup	Malaysia	1–1	Qatar	Kuwait City, Kuwait
--:-- UTC+3	Bahari 20'	Report	Muftah 52'	Stadium: Sabah Al-Salem Stadium; Attendance: 1,000

25 September 1980 AFC Asian Cup	Kuwait	4–0	Qatar	Kuwait City, Kuwait
--:-- UTC+3	Al-Dakhil 23', 57'; Yaqoub 49' (pen.); Al-Anberi 66'	Report		Stadium: Sabah Al-Salem Stadium; Attendance: 20,000

=== 1981 ===
18 March 1982 FIFA World Cup qualification	Iraq	1–0	Qatar	Riyadh, Saudi Arabia
--:-- UTC+3	Saeed 84'	Report		Stadium: Al Malaz Stadium; Attendance: 10,751; Referee: Boskovic (Australia)

22 March 1982 FIFA World Cup qualification	Qatar	3–0	Bahrain	Riyadh, Saudi Arabia
--:-- UTC+3	Muftah 21', 64'; Salman 35'	Report		Stadium: Al Malaz Stadium; Attendance: 1,662; Referee: Lee Kok Leong (Singapore)

27 March 1982 FIFA World Cup qualification	Qatar	2–1	Syria	Riyadh, Saudi Arabia
--:-- UTC+3	Khalfan 8'; Muftah 53'	Report	Jehad 15'	Stadium: Al Malaz Stadium; Attendance: 3,967; Referee: Rampley (Australia)

31 March 1982 FIFA World Cup qualification	Saudi Arabia	1–0	Qatar	Riyadh, Saudi Arabia
--:-- UTC+3	Aboloya 85'	Report		Stadium: Al Malaz Stadium; Attendance: 40,000; Referee: Boskovic (Australia)

=== 1982 ===
19 February Friendly	Libya	2–1	Qatar	Tripoli, Libya
--:-- UTC+3				Stadium: 11 June Stadium

19 March 6th Arabian Gulf Cup	United Arab Emirates	1–0	Qatar	Abu Dhabi, United Arab Emirates
--:-- UTC+3	Khamees 30'	Report

22 March 6th Arabian Gulf Cup	Qatar	3–0	Oman	Abu Dhabi, United Arab Emirates
--:-- UTC+3	Bilal 31'; Afifa 43'; Muftah 56'	Report

26 March 6th Arabian Gulf Cup	Iraq	2–1	Qatar	Abu Dhabi, United Arab Emirates
--:-- UTC+3	Mohammed 20', 29'	Report	Muftah 60' (pen.)

29 March 6th Arabian Gulf Cup	Saudi Arabia	1–0	Qatar	Abu Dhabi, United Arab Emirates
--:-- UTC+3	Abdullah 68' (pen.)	Report

31 March 6th Arabian Gulf Cup	Bahrain	1–0	Qatar	Abu Dhabi, United Arab Emirates
--:-- UTC+3	Zwayed 74'	Report

4 April 6th Arabian Gulf Cup	Qatar	2–1	Kuwait	Abu Dhabi, United Arab Emirates
--:-- UTC+3	Salman 39'; Al-Qadi 79'	Report	Al-Ghanem 63'

=== 1983 ===
25 February Friendly	Qatar	1–0	Japan	Doha, Qatar
--:-- UTC+3				Stadium: Hamad bin Khalifa Stadium

8 July Friendly	Qatar	3–1	Sudan	Doha, Qatar
--:-- UTC+3	Zaid; Bilal; Muftah	Report	Abuobeida Adam	Stadium: Hamad bin Khalifa Stadium

10 July Friendly	Qatar	2–0	Sudan	Doha, Qatar
--:-- UTC+3				Stadium: Hamad bin Khalifa Stadium

8 September 1984 Summer Olympics qualification	Qatar	2–1	Jordan	Doha, Qatar
--:-- UTC+3	Muftah 45', 83'	Report	Salama 4'	Stadium: Hamad bin Khalifa Stadium

29 September 1984 Summer Olympics qualification	Kuwait	2–2	Qatar	Kuwait City, Kuwait
--:-- UTC+3	Yussef Al-Suwayed 7'; Khalid Al-Shabib 87'	Report	Ibrahim Khalfan 44'; Khalid Salman 52'

14 October 1984 Summer Olympics qualification	Jordan	0–0	Qatar	Amman, Jordan
--:-- UTC+3		Report

21 October 1984 Summer Olympics qualification	Syria	1–1	Qatar	Damascus, Syria
--:-- UTC+3	Hassan	Report	Muftah 70' (pen.)

28 October 1984 Summer Olympics qualification	Qatar	0–0	Kuwait	Doha, Qatar
--:-- UTC+3		Report		Stadium: Hamad bin Khalifa Stadium

11 November 1984 Summer Olympics qualification	Qatar	1–0	Syria	Doha, Qatar
--:-- UTC+3	Muftah 58'	Report		Stadium: Hamad bin Khalifa Stadium

=== 1984 ===
29 February Friendly	Qatar	1–2	Denmark	Doha, Qatar
--:-- UTC+3				Stadium: Hamad bin Khalifa Stadium

3 March Friendly	Qatar	3–2	Denmark	Doha, Qatar
--:-- UTC+3				Stadium: Hamad bin Khalifa Stadium

10 March 7th Arabian Gulf Cup	Qatar	2–1	Saudi Arabia	Muscat, Oman
--:-- UTC+3	Khalfan 21'; Zaid 29'	Report	Abdullah 33'	Stadium: Royal Oman Police Stadium

12 March 7th Arabian Gulf Cup	United Arab Emirates	1–0	Qatar	Muscat, Oman
--:-- UTC+3	Al-Talyani 4'	Report		Stadium: Royal Oman Police Stadium

16 March 7th Arabian Gulf Cup	Qatar	2–1	Kuwait	Muscat, Oman
--:-- UTC+3	Muftah 15'; Eid 49'	Report	Shabib 45'	Stadium: Royal Oman Police Stadium

18 March 7th Arabian Gulf Cup	Oman	0–2	Qatar	Muscat, Oman
--:-- UTC+3		Report	Zaid 62'; Muftah 68'	Stadium: Royal Oman Police Stadium

22 March 7th Arabian Gulf Cup	Qatar	1–1	Bahrain	Muscat, Oman
--:-- UTC+3	Zaid 60'	Report	Farhan 10'	Stadium: Royal Oman Police Stadium

25 March 7th Arabian Gulf Cup	Qatar	2–1	Iraq	Muscat, Oman
--:-- UTC+3	Muftah 26'; Gorgis 41' (o.g.)	Report	Radhi 55'	Stadium: Royal Oman Police Stadium

28 March 7th Arabian Gulf Cup final	Iraq	1–1 (a.e.t.) (3–2 p)	Qatar	Muscat, Oman
--:-- UTC+3	Dirjal 102'	Report	Muftah 109'	Stadium: Royal Oman Police Stadium

16 April 1984 Summer Olympics qualification	Qatar	2–0	Malaysia	Kallang, Singapore
19:30 UTC+8	Khalfan 52' (pen.); Salman 55'	Report		Stadium: National Stadium; Attendance: 20,000; Referee: Thomson Chan (Hong Kong)

21 April 1984 Summer Olympics qualification	Thailand	0–1	Qatar	Kallang, Singapore
--:-- UTC+8		Report	Khalfan 19'	Stadium: National Stadium; Referee: Lee Kok Leong (Singapore)

23 April 1984 Summer Olympics qualification	Qatar	2–0	Iraq	Kallang, Singapore
--:-- UTC+8	Khalfan 14' (pen.); Muftah 77'	Report		Stadium: National Stadium; Attendance: 30,000; Referee: Zhang Daqiao (China)

26 April 1984 Summer Olympics qualification	Japan	1–2	Qatar	Kallang, Singapore
--:-- UTC+8	Hara 50'	Report	Ibrahim Khalfan 21'; Khalid Salman 64'	Stadium: National Stadium; Referee: Tulu Gurkan (Philippines)

29 July 1984 Summer Olympics	France	2–2	Qatar	Annapolis, United States
19:30 UTC−4	Garande 43'; Xuereb 61'	Report	Al-Muhannadi 55', 60'	Stadium: Navy–Marine Corps Memorial Stadium; Attendance: 29,240; Referee: Filho (Brazil)

31 July 1984 Summer Olympics	Chile	1–0	Qatar	Annapolis, United States
19:00 UTC−4	Baeza 52'	Report		Stadium: Navy–Marine Corps Memorial Stadium; Attendance: 14,568; Referee: Siles (Costa Rica)

2 August 1984 Summer Olympics	Qatar	0–2	Norway	Boston, United States
19:00 UTC−4		Report	Vaadal 21', 52'	Stadium: Harvard Stadium; Attendance: 17,529; Referee: Kalombo (Malawi)

4 September Friendly	Singapore	0–1	Qatar	Kallang, Singapore
--:-- UTC+8		Report	Khalfan 49'	Stadium: Jalan Besar Stadium

10 September 1984 AFC Asian Cup qualification	Qatar	8–0	Afghanistan	Guangzhou, China
19:00 UTC+8	Al-Khater 11', 38'; Salman 16'; Khalfan 32', 33', 58'; Al-Sowaidi 56'; Al-Mehaizaa 85'	Report		Stadium: Yuexiushan Stadium; Attendance: 1,500; Referee: Yoshisato Okaya (Japan)

12 September 1984 AFC Asian Cup qualification	Hong Kong	0–1	Qatar	Guangzhou, China
18:45 UTC+8			Al-Sowaidi 65'	Stadium: Guangdong Provincial People’s Stadium; Attendance: 10,000; Referee: Reynaldo Reyes (Philippines)

17 September 1984 AFC Asian Cup qualification	Qatar	2–0	Jordan	Guangzhou, China
20:45 UTC+8	Al-Barshi 31'; Al-Mohanadi 54'	Report		Stadium: Guangdong Provincial People’s Stadium; Attendance: 20,000; Referee: Yoshisato Okaya (Japan)

20 September 1984 AFC Asian Cup qualification	China	1–0	Qatar	Guangzhou, China
20:45 UTC+8	Zhao Dayu 88'			Stadium: Yuexiushan Stadium; Attendance: 20,000; Referee: Reynaldo Reyes (Philippines)

5 November Friendly	Qatar	0–0	Singapore	Doha, Qatar
--:-- UTC+3				Stadium: Hamad bin Khalifa Stadium

7 November Friendly	Qatar	3–1	Singapore	Doha, Qatar
--:-- UTC+3				Stadium: Hamad bin Khalifa Stadium

22 November Friendly	Qatar	2–2	Finland	Doha, Qatar
--:-- UTC+3		Report	Pekonen 37'; Remes 56'	Stadium: Hamad bin Khalifa Stadium

24 November Friendly	Qatar	1–1	Finland	Doha, Qatar
--:-- UTC+3		Report	Hjelm 65'	Stadium: Hamad bin Khalifa Stadium

1 December 1984 AFC Asian Cup	Qatar	1–1	Syria	Kallang, Singapore
19:00 UTC+8	Khalfan 7'	Report	Anber 47' (o.g.)	Stadium: National Stadium; Attendance: 8,000; Referee: Antonio Márquez (Mexico)

3 December 1984 AFC Asian Cup	Kuwait	1–0	Qatar	Kallang, Singapore
21:00 UTC+8	Al-Rumaihi 52' (o.g.)	Report		Stadium: National Stadium; Attendance: 18,525; Referee: Augusto Lamo (Spain)

8 December 1984 AFC Asian Cup	Qatar	1–1	Saudi Arabia	Kallang, Singapore
19:00 UTC+8	Zaid 47'	Report	Al-Jawad 65'	Stadium: National Stadium; Attendance: 15,000; Referee: Antonio Márquez (Mexico)

10 December 1984 AFC Asian Cup	South Korea	0–1	Qatar	Kallang, Singapore
21:00 UTC+8		Report	Salman 69'	Stadium: National Stadium; Attendance: 3,659; Referee: Augusto Lamo (Spain)

=== 1985 ===
15 March 1986 FIFA World Cup qualification	Jordan	1–0	Qatar	Amman, Jordan
--:-- UTC+3	Saleh 83'			Stadium: Amman International Stadium; Referee: Abuwahid Shambe Al-Baluchi (Oman)

22 March 1986 FIFA World Cup qualification	Qatar	7–0	Lebanon	Doha, Qatar
--:-- UTC+3	Muftah; Khamis; Khalfan; Daham			Stadium: Hamad bin Khalifa Stadium; Referee: Hamed Assaid (Oman)

27 March 1986 FIFA World Cup qualification	Lebanon	0–8	Qatar	Doha, Qatar
--:-- UTC+3			Muftah 27', 73', 85', 88'; Zaid 61', 65', 69'; Al-Mehaizaa 13'	Stadium: Hamad bin Khalifa Stadium; Referee: Jassim Mandi (Bahrain)

5 April 1986 FIFA World Cup qualification	Qatar	3–0	Iraq	Doha, Qatar
--:-- UTC+3	Muftah 40'; Issa Al-Mohammadi 52' (pen.); Al-Ammari 71'			Stadium: Hamad bin Khalifa Stadium; Referee: Na Yoon-shik (South Korea)

12 April 1986 FIFA World Cup qualification	Qatar	2–0	Jordan	Doha, Qatar
--:-- UTC+3	Zaid 53'; Malalla 78'			Stadium: Hamad bin Khalifa Stadium; Referee: Mohamed Sanhoub (Yemen)

5 May 1986 FIFA World Cup qualification	Iraq	2–1	Qatar	Calcutta, India
--:-- UTC+3	Radhi 21'; Allawi 76'		Muftah 44'	Stadium: Yuva Bharati Krirangan; Attendance: 30,000; Referee: George Courtney (England)

5 July 1985 Arab Cup	Qatar	2–0	Jordan	Taif, Saudi Arabia
--:-- UTC+3	Khalfan 32'; Muftah 66'			Stadium: King Fahd Stadium; Referee: Belaïd Lacarne (Algeria)

7 July 1985 Arab Cup	Saudi Arabia	1–0	Qatar	Taif, Saudi Arabia
--:-- UTC+3	Mohammad 61'			Stadium: King Fahd Stadium

10 July 1985 Arab Cup	Bahrain	1–1 (a.e.t.) (3–1 p)	Qatar	Taif, Saudi Arabia
--:-- UTC+3	Al-Harban 55'		Muftah 40'	Stadium: King Fahd Stadium; Referee: Abdul Aziz Al-Salmi (Kuwait)
	Penalties
	Hassan (penalty missed); Shwetar (penalty scored); Saif (penalty scored); Al-Harban (penalty scored)		(penalty scored) Al-Adsani; (penalty missed) Al Ammari; (penalty missed) Sabela; (penalty missed) Muftah

12 July 1985 Arab Cup	Saudi Arabia	0–0 (a.e.t.) (3–1 p)	Qatar	Taif, Saudi Arabia
--:-- UTC+3				Stadium: King Fahd Stadium; Referee: Nizar Watti (Syria)
	Penalties
	Abd Al-Jawad (penalty scored); Al-Bishi (penalty scored); Al-Dosari (penalty scored); Khamees (penalty missed)		(penalty scored) Al-Adsani; (penalty missed) Anber; (penalty missed) Khalfan; (penalty missed) Zaid

22 November Friendly	Qatar	0–0	Syria	Doha, Qatar
--:-- UTC+3				Stadium: Hamad bin Khalifa Stadium

29 November Friendly	Qatar	3–0	Oman	Doha, Qatar
--:-- UTC+3				Stadium: Hamad bin Khalifa Stadium

=== 1986 ===
3 January Friendly	Qatar	1–1	China	Doha, Qatar
--:-- UTC+3		Report	Li Huayun 55'	Stadium: Hamad bin Khalifa Stadium

17 January Friendly	Qatar	0–1	Greece	Al Rayyan, Qatar
--:-- UTC+3		Report	Saravakos 12'	Stadium: Khalifa International Stadium

24 January Friendly	Qatar	2–1	Tunisia	Al Rayyan, Qatar
--:-- UTC+3		Report	Maâloul	Stadium: Khalifa International Stadium

2 February Friendly	Qatar	0–3	Hungary	Al Rayyan, Qatar
--:-- UTC+3		Report	Hannich 12'; Kiprich 37'; Détári 50'	Stadium: Khalifa International Stadium

6 February Friendly	Qatar	0–0	Denmark	Al Rayyan, Qatar
--:-- UTC+3		Report		Stadium: Khalifa International Stadium

9 February Friendly	Qatar	1–1	Denmark	Al Rayyan, Qatar
--:-- UTC+3	Bilal 38'	Report	Povlsen 2'	Stadium: Khalifa International Stadium

26 February Friendly	Qatar	1–1	Paraguay	Al Rayyan, Qatar
--:-- UTC+3	Bilal 39'	Report	Delgado 86'	Stadium: Khalifa International Stadium

1 March Friendly	Qatar	0–3	Paraguay	Al Rayyan, Qatar
--:-- UTC+3		Report	Ferreira; Zabala; Samaniego	Stadium: Khalifa International Stadium

23 March 8th Arabian Gulf Cup	Qatar	2–1	Oman	Manama, Bahrain
--:-- UTC+3	Al-Mohammadi 24'; Khamis 53'		Humeid 54'	Stadium: Bahrain National Stadium

27 March 8th Arabian Gulf Cup	Iraq	1–1	Qatar	Manama, Bahrain
--:-- UTC+3	Jafar 61'		Khamis 83'	Stadium: Bahrain National Stadium

29 March 8th Arabian Gulf Cup	Qatar	0–0	Bahrain	Manama, Bahrain
--:-- UTC+3				Stadium: Bahrain National Stadium

1 April 8th Arabian Gulf Cup	Kuwait	2–1	Qatar	Manama, Bahrain
--:-- UTC+3	Al-Dakhil 27', 63'		Khamis 83'	Stadium: Bahrain National Stadium

5 April 8th Arabian Gulf Cup	Saudi Arabia	2–0	Qatar	Manama, Bahrain
--:-- UTC+3	Al-Jam'an 35'; Al-Nafisah 53'			Stadium: Bahrain National Stadium

7 April 8th Arabian Gulf Cup	Qatar	3–2	United Arab Emirates	Manama, Bahrain
--:-- UTC+3	Khamis 64'; Salman 81', 87'		F. Khamees 19'; Al Talyani 55'	Stadium: Bahrain National Stadium

21 September 1986 Asian Games	Qatar	1–1	Indonesia	Gwangju, South Korea
--:-- UTC+9	Salman 29'		Kabo 68'	Stadium: Gwangju Stadium

23 September 1986 Asian Games	Malaysia	1–1	Qatar	Gwangju, South Korea
--:-- UTC+9	Ahmad 33'		Al-Sowaidi 90'	Stadium: Gwangju Stadium

29 September 1986 Asian Games	Qatar	0–1	Saudi Arabia	Gwangju, South Korea
--:-- UTC+9			Al-Jam'an 21'	Stadium: Gwangju Stadium

=== 1987 ===
17 April 1988 Summer Olympics qualification	Qatar	2–0	Syria	Al Rayyan, Qatar
--:-- UTC+3	Muftah; Khamis			Stadium: Khalifa International Stadium

24 April 1988 Summer Olympics qualification	Syria	0–3	Qatar	Doha, Qatar
--:-- UTC+3		Report	Issa Ahmed; Mansour Muftah	Stadium: Khalifa International Stadium

16 November Friendly	Qatar	2–2	Malaysia	Al Rayyan, Qatar
--:-- UTC+3		Report		Stadium: Khalifa International Stadium

18 November Friendly	Qatar	1–0	Malaysia	Al Rayyan, Qatar
--:-- UTC+3				Stadium: Khalifa International Stadium

4 December 1988 Summer Olympics qualification	Qatar	0–0	Kuwait	Al Rayyan, Qatar
--:-- UTC+3				Stadium: Khalifa International Stadium

11 December 1988 Summer Olympics qualification	Qatar	1–3	Iraq	Al Rayyan, Qatar
--:-- UTC+3	Salman 17' (pen.)		Saeed 41'; Hussein 59'; Hashem 89'	Stadium: Khalifa International Stadium

18 December 1988 Summer Olympics qualification	Saudi Arabia	1–1	Qatar	Riyadh, Saudi Arabia
--:-- UTC+3	Jamel 48'	Report	Al-Mohammadi 61'

=== 1988 ===
1 January 1988 Summer Olympics qualification	Kuwait	0–0	Qatar	Kuwait City, Kuwait
--:-- UTC+3		Report

8 January 1988 Summer Olympics qualification	Iraq	4–1	Qatar	Muscat, Oman
--:-- UTC+3	Khalil Mohammed Allawi 9'; Habib Jaafar 76'; Ahmed Radhi 16'; Ali Hussein 17'	Report	Khalid Salman 79'	Stadium: Sultan Qaboos Sports Complex

15 January 1988 Summer Olympics qualification	Qatar	1–0	Saudi Arabia	Al Rayyan, Qatar
--:-- UTC+3	Johar 85' (pen.)			Stadium: Khalifa International Stadium

21 January Friendly	Qatar	2–3	Bulgaria	Al Rayyan, Qatar
--:-- UTC+3				Stadium: Jassim bin Hamad Stadium

3 March 9th Arabian Gulf Cup	Qatar	1–1	Kuwait	Riyadh, Saudi Arabia
--:-- UTC+3				Stadium: King Fahd International Stadium

3 March 9th Arabian Gulf Cup	Saudi Arabia	0–0	Qatar	Riyadh, Saudi Arabia
--:-- UTC+3				Stadium: King Fahd International Stadium

8 March 9th Arabian Gulf Cup	Qatar	2–1	United Arab Emirates	Riyadh, Saudi Arabia
--:-- UTC+3	Salman 35' Soufi 58'		Mohamed	Stadium: King Fahd International Stadium

10 March 9th Arabian Gulf Cup	Oman	2–1	Qatar	Riyadh, Saudi Arabia
--:-- UTC+3	Younis 51' (pen.) Khamis 69'		Muftah 73'	Stadium: King Fahd International Stadium

13 March 9th Arabian Gulf Cup	Qatar	0–3	Iraq	Riyadh, Saudi Arabia
--:-- UTC+3			Jafar 58'; Radhi 80' 81'	Stadium: King Fahd International Stadium

16 March 9th Arabian Gulf Cup	Bahrain	1–0	Qatar	Riyadh, Saudi Arabia
--:-- UTC+3				Stadium: King Fahd International Stadium

2 October Friendly	Indonesia	0–1	Qatar	Jakarta, Indonesia
--:-- UTC+7				Stadium: Gelora Bung Karno Stadium

4 October Friendly	Indonesia	1–4	Qatar	Jakarta, Indonesia
--:-- UTC+7				Stadium: Gelora Bung Karno Stadium

9 October Friendly	Singapore	0–1	Qatar	Kallang, Singapore
--:-- UTC+8				Stadium: National Stadium

9 November Friendly	Indonesia	0–1	Qatar	Jakarta, Indonesia
--:-- UTC+7				Stadium: Gelora Bung Karno Stadium

13 November Friendly	Singapore	0–1	Qatar	Kallang, Singapore
--:-- UTC+8				Stadium: Jalan Besar Stadium

2 December 1988 AFC Asian Cup	Iran	2–0	Qatar	Doha, Qatar
16:00 UTC+3	Bavi 6'; Pious 89'	Report		Stadium: Al-Ahly Stadium; Attendance: 15,000; Referee: Michel Vautrot (France)

5 December 1988 AFC Asian Cup	Qatar	2–1	United Arab Emirates	Doha, Qatar
17:00 UTC+3	Muftah 17'; Musabah 26' (o.g.)	Report	H. Mohamed 35'	Stadium: Qatar SC Stadium; Attendance: 2,000; Referee: Erik Fredriksson (Sweden)

9 December 1988 AFC Asian Cup	Qatar	2–3	South Korea	Doha, Qatar
17:00 UTC+3	Salman 47' (pen.), 80' (pen.)	Report	Chung Hae-won 10', 72'; Kim Joo-sung 34'	Stadium: Qatar SC Stadium; Attendance: 15,000; Referee: George Courtney (England)

12 December 1988 AFC Asian Cup	Japan	0–3	Qatar	Doha, Qatar
17:00 UTC+3		Report	Khamis 58', 82'; Muftah 90'	Stadium: Al-Ahly Stadium; Attendance: 10,000; Referee: Yusuf Namoğlu (Turkey)

=== 1989 ===
6 January 1990 FIFA World Cup qualification	Qatar	1–0	Jordan	Doha, Qatar
--:-- UTC+3	Al-Soufi 21'	Report		Stadium: Hamad bin Khalifa Stadium; Attendance: 2,859; Referee: Lee Peng Ann (Singapore)

13 January 1990 FIFA World Cup qualification	Oman	0–0	Qatar	Muscat, Oman
--:-- UTC+3		Report		Stadium: Sultan Qaboos Sports Complex; Referee: Al-Nasir (Saudi Arabia)

20 January 1990 FIFA World Cup qualification	Qatar	1–0	Iraq	Doha, Qatar
--:-- UTC+3	Al-Soufi 21'	Report		Stadium: Grand Hamad Stadium; Attendance: 3,243; Referee: Zhong Bohong (China)

27 January 1990 FIFA World Cup qualification	Jordan	1–1	Qatar	Amman, Jordan
--:-- UTC+3	Awad 90'	Report	Al-Soufi 90'	Stadium: Amman International Stadium; Referee: Syed Iqbal (India)

3 February 1990 FIFA World Cup qualification	Qatar	3–0	Oman	Doha, Qatar
--:-- UTC+3	Al-Majid 32'; Al-Soufi 67', 81'	Report		Stadium: Grand Hamad Stadium; Referee: Al-Jassas (Kuwait)

10 February 1990 FIFA World Cup qualification	Iraq	2–2	Qatar	Baghdad, Iraq
--:-- UTC+3	Radhi 31'; Saeed 75'	Report	Al-Mehaizaa 18'; Khamis 85'	Stadium: Al-Shaab Stadium; Referee: Sano (Japan)

27 March Friendly	Qatar	1–0	Malaysia	Al Rayyan, Qatar
--:-- UTC+3				Stadium: Jassim bin Hamad Stadium

21 July Friendly	Egypt	3–3	Qatar	Cairo, Egypt
--:-- UTC+2

30 July Friendly	Algeria	1–1	Qatar	Tlemcen, Algeria
--:-- UTC+1				Stadium: Colonel Lotfi Stadium; Attendance: 12,000

17 August Friendly	Singapore	4–1	Qatar	Kallang, Singapore
--:-- UTC+8				Stadium: National Stadium

22 September Friendly	Kuwait	1–0	Qatar	Kuwait City, Kuwait
--:-- UTC+2

13 October 1990 FIFA World Cup qualification	South Korea	0–0	Qatar	Kallang, Singapore
--:-- UTC+8		Report		Stadium: National Stadium; Referee: Joël Quiniou (France)

16 October 1990 FIFA World Cup qualification	Qatar	1–1	Saudi Arabia	Kallang, Singapore
--:-- UTC+3	Muftah 87'	Report	Al-Suwaiti 4'	Stadium: National Stadium; Attendance: 15,000; Referee: Zoran Petrović (Yugoslavia)

20 October 1990 FIFA World Cup qualification	North Korea	2–0	Qatar	Kallang, Singapore
--:-- UTC+8	Kim Pung-Il 23'; Ghu Gyong-sik 32'	Report		Stadium: National Stadium; Referee: José Antonio García (Mexico)

24 October 1990 FIFA World Cup qualification	United Arab Emirates	1–1	Qatar	Kallang, Singapore
--:-- UTC+8	K. Mubarak 20'	Report	Sulaiti 37'	Stadium: National Stadium; Referee: Zoran Petrović (Yugoslavia)

28 October 1990 FIFA World Cup qualification	Qatar	2–1	China	Kallang, Singapore
--:-- UTC+3	Al-Soufi 87'; Muftah 87'	Report	Ma Lin 76'	Stadium: National Stadium; Referee: Vincent Mauro (United States)

3 November Friendly	Qatar	0–2	Egypt	Al Rayyan, Qatar
--:-- UTC+3				Stadium: Jassim bin Hamad Stadium

=== 1990 ===
23 February 10th Arabian Gulf Cup	Qatar	0–0	Bahrain	Kuwait City, Kuwait
--:-- UTC+3		Report		Stadium: Peace & Friendship Stadium; Attendance: 6,500

27 February 10th Arabian Gulf Cup	Qatar	0–0	United Arab Emirates	Kuwait City, Kuwait
--:-- UTC+3		Report		Stadium: Peace & Friendship Stadium; Attendance: 10,000

4 March 10th Arabian Gulf Cup	Oman	2–4	Qatar	Kuwait City, Kuwait
--:-- UTC+3	Humaid 4'; Abduannour 59'	Report	Khamis 47'; Muftah 49', 66'; Soufi 83'	Stadium: Peace & Friendship Stadium

7 March 10th Arabian Gulf Cup	Kuwait	2–0	Qatar	Kuwait City, Kuwait
--:-- UTC+3	Badiyh 24'; Hajeyah 61'	Report		Stadium: Peace & Friendship Stadium

=== 1992 ===
9 January Friendly	Qatar	1–1	Thailand	Al Rayyan, Qatar
--:-- UTC+3				Stadium: Jassim bin Hamad Stadium

12 January Friendly	Qatar	4–0	Thailand	Al Rayyan, Qatar
--:-- UTC+3				Stadium: Jassim bin Hamad Stadium

14 May Friendly	United Arab Emirates	1–0	Qatar	Dubai, United Arab Emirates
--:-- UTC+3				Stadium: Al-Maktoum Stadium

19 May Friendly	Qatar	0–0	Kuwait	Al Rayyan, Qatar
--:-- UTC+3				Stadium: Jassim bin Hamad Stadium

29 May 1992 AFC Asian Cup qualification	Qatar	4–2	Syria	Al Rayyan, Qatar
--:-- UTC+3	Soufi 33'; Khamis 55', 65'; Al Mulla 72'	Report	Ramadan 56', 80'	Stadium: Khalifa International Stadium; Attendance: 15,000; Referee: Ali Bujsaim (United Arab Emirates)

31 May 1992 AFC Asian Cup qualification	Qatar	4–0	Syria	Al Rayyan, Qatar
--:-- UTC+3	Soufi 46'; Khamis 60'; Mustafa 65', 90'	Report		Stadium: Jassim bin Hamad Stadium; Attendance: 11,500; Referee: Talal Saleh (Lebanon)

11 October Friendly	Qatar	1–4	Hungary	Al Rayyan, Qatar
--:-- UTC+3				Stadium: Khalifa International Stadium

13 October Friendly	Qatar	1–1	Hungary	Al Rayyan, Qatar
--:-- UTC+3				Stadium: Khalifa International Stadium

29 October 1992 AFC Asian Cup	Thailand	1–1	Qatar	Hiroshima, Japan
19:00 UTC+9	Thanis 42'	Report	Soufi 81'	Stadium: Hiroshima Big Arch; Attendance: 21,000; Referee: Hossein Khoshkhan (Iran)

31 October 1992 AFC Asian Cup	Saudi Arabia	1–1	Qatar	Hiroshima, Japan
13:00 UTC+9	Al-Muwallid 86'	Report	Mustafa 74'	Stadium: Hiroshima Stadium; Attendance: 4,000; Referee: Neji Jouini (Tunisia)

2 November 1992 AFC Asian Cup	Qatar	1–2	China	Onomichi, Japan
19:00 UTC+9	Al-Sulaiti 20'	Report	Peng Weiguo 44', 58'	Stadium: Bingo Sports Park; Attendance: 4,200

27 November 11th Arabian Gulf Cup	Qatar	2–0	Oman	Al Rayyan, Qatar
--:-- UTC+3	Mustafa 22' (pen.), 53'	Report		Stadium: Khalifa International Stadium

30 November 11th Arabian Gulf Cup	Qatar	1–0	Bahrain	Al Rayyan, Qatar
--:-- UTC+3	Al-Kuwari 84'	Report		Stadium: Khalifa International Stadium

3 December 11th Arabian Gulf Cup	Qatar	4–0	Kuwait	Al Rayyan, Qatar
--:-- UTC+3	Al-Mulla 7'; Khamis 49'; Soufi 66'; Mustafa 66'	Report		Stadium: Khalifa International Stadium

6 December 11th Arabian Gulf Cup	Qatar	1–0	United Arab Emirates	Al Rayyan, Qatar
--:-- UTC+3	Soufi 38'	Report		Stadium: Khalifa International Stadium

10 December 11th Arabian Gulf Cup	Qatar	0–1	Saudi Arabia	Al Rayyan, Qatar
--:-- UTC+3		Report	Al-Owairan 60'	Stadium: Khalifa International Stadium

=== 1993 ===
12 March Friendly	Qatar	1–2	Jordan	Doha, Qatar
--:-- UTC+3				Stadium: Grand Hamad Stadium

14 March Friendly	Qatar	1–1	Jordan	Doha, Qatar
--:-- UTC+3				Stadium: Grand Hamad Stadium

17 March Friendly	Qatar	3–0	Lebanon	Al Rayyan, Qatar
--:-- UTC+3				Stadium: Khalifa International Stadium

19 March Friendly	Qatar	2–0	Lebanon	Al Rayyan, Qatar
--:-- UTC+3				Stadium: Khalifa International Stadium

30 March Friendly	Qatar	1–6	Norway	Al Rayyan, Qatar
--:-- UTC+3				Stadium: Khalifa International Stadium

9 April 1994 FIFA World Cup qualification	Qatar	3–1	Indonesia	Al Rayyan, Qatar
--:-- UTC+3	Soufi 51', 79'; Al-Kuwari 55'	Report	Singgih Pitono 85'	Stadium: Khalifa International Stadium

11 April 1994 FIFA World Cup qualification	Qatar	4–0	Vietnam	Al Rayyan, Qatar
18:15 UTC+3	Mustafa 34'; Soufi 37'; Khalaf 50'; Al-Kuwari 60'	Report		Stadium: Khalifa International Stadium; Attendance: 7,500; Referee: Wang Xuezhi (China)

16 April 1994 FIFA World Cup qualification	Qatar	4–1	Singapore	Al Rayyan, Qatar
--:-- UTC+3	Mustafa 70', 90' (pen.); Soufi 84'; Al-Malki 89'	Report	Ahmad 58'	Stadium: Khalifa International Stadium

18 April 1994 FIFA World Cup qualification	Qatar	1–2	North Korea	Al Rayyan, Qatar
--:-- UTC+3	Al-Malki 89'	Report	Ryu Song-Gun 49', 57'	Stadium: Khalifa International Stadium

24 April 1994 FIFA World Cup qualification	Indonesia	1–4	Qatar	Kallang, Singapore
--:-- UTC+3	Sudirman 28' (pen.)	Report	Al-Malki 35', 61'; F. Al-Kuwari 75'; Z. Al-Kuwari 83'	Stadium: National Stadium

26 April 1994 FIFA World Cup qualification	Vietnam	0–4	Qatar	Kallang, Singapore
20:30 UTC+3		Report	Al-Malki 7'; Z. Al-Kuwari 13'; F. Al-Kuwari 52' (pen.); Al-Boloushi 65'	Stadium: National Stadium; Attendance: 10,000; Referee: Chang Shan Yi (Chinese Taipei)

30 April 1994 FIFA World Cup qualification	Singapore	1–0	Qatar	Kallang, Singapore
--:-- UTC+3	Ahmad 80'	Report		Stadium: National Stadium

2 May 1994 FIFA World Cup qualification	North Korea	2–2	Qatar	Kallang, Singapore
--:-- UTC+3	Cho In-Chol 40'; Kim Kyong-Il 55'	Report	Al-Malki 1', 86'	Stadium: National Stadium

=== 1994 ===
25 January Friendly	Qatar	1–0	Finland	Doha, Qatar
--:-- UTC+3				Stadium: Hamad bin Khalifa Stadium

25 January Friendly	Qatar	0–0	Finland	Doha, Qatar
--:-- UTC+3				Stadium: Hamad bin Khalifa Stadium

15 September 1994 Qatar Independence Cup	Qatar	0–2	Oman	Al Rayyan, Qatar
--:-- UTC+3		Report		Stadium: Khalifa International Stadium

17 September 1994 Qatar Independence Cup	Qatar	2–0	Sudan	Al Rayyan, Qatar
--:-- UTC+3		Report		Stadium: Khalifa International Stadium

21 September 1994 Qatar Independence Cup	Yemen	0–2	Qatar	Al Rayyan, Qatar
--:-- UTC+3		Report		Stadium: Khalifa International Stadium

23 September 1994 Qatar Independence Cup final	Qatar	1–2	Oman	Al Rayyan, Qatar
--:-- UTC+3	Hassan 28'	Report	Hamdan 13'; Shaban 75'	Stadium: Khalifa International Stadium

3 October 1994 Asian Games	Qatar	2–2	Myanmar	Miyoshi, Japan
16:00 UTC+9	Salem 44' (pen.); Soufi 57'	Report	Win Aung 81'; Tin Myint Aung 83'	Stadium: Athletic Stadium

5 October 1994 Asian Games	Japan	1–1	Qatar	Hiroshima, Japan
19:00 UTC+9	Takagi 56'	Report	Khamis 21'	Stadium: Hiroshima Stadium

9 October 1994 Asian Games	United Arab Emirates	2–2	Qatar	Onomichi, Japan
16:00 UTC+9	Khamees 26'; Al-Talyani 78'	Report	Salem 40' (pen.); Soufi 70'	Stadium: Bingo Stadium

3 November 12th Arabian Gulf Cup	United Arab Emirates	2–0	Qatar	Abu Dhabi, United Arab Emirates
--:-- UTC+3	Talyani 11'; Ali 18' (pen.)	Report		Stadium: Zayed Sports City; Attendance: 60,090

7 November 12th Arabian Gulf Cup	Kuwait	1–0	Qatar	Abu Dhabi, United Arab Emirates
--:-- UTC+3	Marwi 70'	Report		Stadium: Zayed Sports City; Attendance: 4,000

9 November 12th Arabian Gulf Cup	Qatar	4–2	Oman	Abu Dhabi, United Arab Emirates
--:-- UTC+3	Soufi 38', 45'; Salem 76'; Khamis 86'	Report	Ali 33'; Noor 50' (pen.)	Stadium: Zayed Sports City; Attendance: 2,500

12 November 12th Arabian Gulf Cup	Qatar	1–2	Saudi Arabia	Abu Dhabi, United Arab Emirates
--:-- UTC+3	Soufi 2'	Report	Jamil 33'; Anwar 61'	Stadium: Zayed Sports City; Attendance: 8,000

15 November 12th Arabian Gulf Cup	Bahrain	1–1	Qatar	Abu Dhabi, United Arab Emirates
--:-- UTC+3	Darwish 28'	Report	Soufi 68'	Stadium: Zayed Sports City; Attendance: 4,000

=== 1996 ===
17 January Friendly	Qatar	1–0	Yemen	Al Rayyan, Qatar
--:-- UTC+3				Stadium: Khalifa International Stadium

4 February Friendly	Qatar	2–3	Romania	Al Rayyan, Qatar
--:-- UTC+3				Stadium: Jassim bin Hamad Stadium

18 February Friendly	Qatar	1–1	Ecuador	Al Rayyan, Qatar
--:-- UTC+3				Stadium: Jassim bin Hamad Stadium

25 February Friendly	Qatar	1–2	Ecuador	Al Rayyan, Qatar
--:-- UTC+3				Stadium: Jassim bin Hamad Stadium

21 April Friendly	Qatar	3–1	Kuwait	Doha, Qatar
--:-- UTC+3				Stadium: Grand Hamad Stadium

17 May Friendly	Iran	2–0	Qatar	Tabriz, Iran
--:-- UTC+3				Stadium: Takhti Stadium

25 May Friendly	Qatar	2–5	Russia	Al Rayyan, Qatar
--:-- UTC+3				Stadium: Khalifa International Stadium

1 June Friendly	Qatar	0–1	Iran	Al Rayyan, Qatar
--:-- UTC+3				Stadium: Khalifa International Stadium

14 June 1996 AFC Asian Cup qualification	Kazakhstan	1–0	Qatar	Almaty, Kazakhstan
--:-- UTC+3	Nizovtsev 7'			Stadium: Central Stadium; Attendance: 6,000; Referee: Pirom Un-Prasert (Thailand)

28 June 1996 AFC Asian Cup qualification	Qatar	1–0	Syria	Al Rayyan, Qatar
--:-- UTC+3	Al-Enazi 35'			Stadium: Khalifa International Stadium; Referee: Ali Bujsaim (UAE)

5 July 1996 AFC Asian Cup qualification	Qatar	3–0	Kazakhstan	Al Rayyan, Qatar
--:-- UTC+3	Al-Obaidly 5'; Soufi 21'; Al-Enazi 43'			Stadium: Khalifa International Stadium; Referee: Omer Al-Mehannah (Saudi Arabia)

19 July 1996 AFC Asian Cup qualification	Syria	1–0	Qatar	Damascus, Syria
--:-- UTC+3	Helou 17'; M. Sheikh-Dib 48'; Khalifa 76' (pen.)		Al-Enazi 58'	Stadium: Abbasiyyin Stadium; Attendance: 20,000; Referee: Hossein Askari (Iran)

20 September 1998 FIFA World Cup qualification	Qatar	3–0	Sri Lanka	Al Rayyan, Qatar
--:-- UTC+3	Soufi 35'; Al-Enazi 51'; Mustafa 81'			Stadium: Khalifa International Stadium; Attendance: 1,000; Referee: Kurmanbek Ordabayev (Kazakhstan)

23 September 1998 FIFA World Cup qualification	Qatar	5–0	Philippines	Al Rayyan, Qatar
--:-- UTC+3	Al-Enazi 19', 41'; Soufi 29'; Khamis 30'; Jaloof 38'			Stadium: Khalifa International Stadium; Attendance: 800; Referee: Muhammad Sahib (Iraq)

27 September 1998 FIFA World Cup qualification	Qatar	6–0	India	Al Rayyan, Qatar
18:15 UTC+3	Al-Enazi 27', 40'; Al Kuwari 42'; Maayof 47'; Soufi 52'; Mustafa 61'			Stadium: Khalifa International Stadium; Attendance: 3,000; Referee: Omar Ali Al Shughair (Saudi Arabia)

5 October Friendly	Qatar	3–2	New Zealand	Al Rayyan, Qatar
--:-- UTC+3				Stadium: Khalifa International Stadium

16 October 13th Arabian Gulf Cup	United Arab Emirates	0–1	Qatar	Muscat, Oman
--:-- UTC+3		Report	Al-Shafi 13'	Stadium: Sultan Qaboos Sports Complex

19 October 13th Arabian Gulf Cup	Qatar	2–2	Saudi Arabia	Muscat, Oman
--:-- UTC+3	Al-Shafi 21'; Bujaloof 86'	Report	Madani 46'; Al-Jaber 66'	Stadium: Sultan Qaboos Sports Complex

21 October 13th Arabian Gulf Cup	Oman	0–3	Qatar	Muscat, Oman
--:-- UTC+3		Report	Soufi 5'; Al-Ezani 21', 88'	Stadium: Sultan Qaboos Sports Complex

26 October 13th Arabian Gulf Cup	Bahrain	1–2	Qatar	Muscat, Oman
--:-- UTC+3	Eid 86'	Report	Soufi 32'; Al-Ezani 43'	Stadium: Sultan Qaboos Sports Complex

28 October 13th Arabian Gulf Cup	Qatar	1–2	Kuwait	Muscat, Oman
--:-- UTC+3	Al-Ezani 85'	Report	Abdullah 69'; Al-Saleh 76'	Stadium: Sultan Qaboos Sports Complex

=== 1997 ===
19 September 1998 FIFA World Cup qualification	Qatar	0–2	Kuwait	Al Rayyan, Qatar
18:30 UTC+3		Report	Al-Huwaidi 16'; Abdulaziz 88'	Stadium: Jassim bin Hamad Stadium; Attendance: 10,000; Referee: Jamal Al-Sharif (Syria)

26 September 1998 FIFA World Cup qualification	Qatar	1–1	China	Al Rayyan, Qatar
18:15 UTC+3	Nasir Khamees 10'	Report	Hao Haidong 67'	Stadium: Jassim bin Hamad Stadium; Attendance: 9,000; Referee: Mahmoud Nurilddin (Iraq)

3 October 1998 FIFA World Cup qualification	Iran	3–0	Qatar	Tehran, Iran
17:00 UTC+4	Daei 31'; Bagheri 42', 56'	Report		Stadium: Azadi Stadium; Attendance: 70,000; Referee: Sidi Magassa (Mali)

11 October 1998 FIFA World Cup qualification	Saudi Arabia	1–0	Qatar	Riyadh, Saudi Arabia
--:-- UTC+3	Mehalel 66'	Report		Stadium: King Fahd International Stadium; Attendance: 15,000; Referee: Gamal Al-Ghandour (Egypt)

24 October 1998 FIFA World Cup qualification	Kuwait	0–1	Qatar	Kuwait City, Kuwait
--:-- UTC+3		Report	Al-Noobi 10'	Stadium: Kazma SC Stadium; Attendance: 18,000; Referee: Nazri Abdullah Mohamed (Malaysia)

31 October 1998 FIFA World Cup qualification	China	2–3	Qatar	Dalian, China
--:-- UTC+8	Gao Feng 19'; Fan Zhiyi 80'	Report	Al-Naemi 44'; Al-Enazi 54'; Al-Kuwari 60'	Stadium: Jinzhou Stadium; Attendance: 35,000; Referee: Santhan Nagalingam (Singapore)

7 November 1998 FIFA World Cup qualification	Qatar	2–0	Iran	Al Rayyan, Qatar
--:-- UTC+3	Al-Enazi 38', 81'	Report		Stadium: Jassim bin Hamad Stadium; Attendance: 20,000; Referee: Horacio Elizondo (Argentina)

12 November 1998 FIFA World Cup qualification	Qatar	0–1	Saudi Arabia	Al Rayyan, Qatar
--:-- UTC+3		Report	Al-Shahrani 61'	Stadium: Jassim bin Hamad Stadium; Attendance: 20,000; Referee: Kim Milton Nielsen (Denmark)

=== 1998 ===
31 July Friendly	Qatar	0–0	Bangladesh	Al Rayyan, Qatar
--:-- UTC+3				Stadium: Khalifa International Stadium

16 September Friendly	Qatar	1–1	Sudan	Al Rayyan, Qatar
--:-- UTC+3				Stadium: Jassim bin Hamad Stadium

22 September 1998 Arab Cup	Qatar	2–1	Libya	Al Rayyan, Qatar
--:-- UTC+3	Khamis 44'; Mustafa 49'		Ramadan 43'	Stadium: Jassim bin Hamad Stadium; Attendance: 20,000; Referee: Mohamed Koussa (Syria)

26 September 1998 Arab Cup	Qatar	2–0	Jordan	Al Rayyan, Qatar
--:-- UTC+3	Mustafa 17'; Khamis 69'			Stadium: Jassim bin Hamad Stadium; Attendance: 20,000; Referee: Qassem Hamza (Kuwait)

29 September 1998 Arab Cup	Qatar	2–1	United Arab Emirates	Al Rayyan, Qatar
--:-- UTC+3	Nazmi 65'; Al-Kowari 75'		Hassan 60'	Stadium: Jassim bin Hamad Stadium; Attendance: 20,000; Referee: Mohamed Koussa (Syria)

1 October 1998 Arab Cup final	Qatar	1–3	Saudi Arabia	Al Rayyan, Qatar
--:-- UTC+3	Mustafa 82'		Al-Dosari 28', 49', 64'	Stadium: Khalifa International Stadium; Attendance: 25,000; Referee: Hicham Guirat (Tunisia)

17 October Friendly	Qatar	2–2	Burkina Faso	Al Rayyan, Qatar
--:-- UTC+3				Stadium: Khalifa International Stadium

31 October 14th Arabian Gulf Cup	Oman	2–1	Qatar	Riffa, Bahrain
--:-- UTC+7	Al-Masori 25'; Al-Siyabi 59'	Report	Khamis 29'	Stadium: Bahrain National Stadium

2 November 14th Arabian Gulf Cup	Kuwait	6–2	Qatar	Riffa, Bahrain
--:-- UTC+7	Al-Huwaidi 8', 28', 57', 73', 90'; Abdullah 51'	Report	Bujaloof 20'; Mustafa 80'	Stadium: Bahrain National Stadium

5 November 14th Arabian Gulf Cup	Qatar	0–0	United Arab Emirates	Riffa, Bahrain
--:-- UTC+3		Report		Stadium: Bahrain National Stadium

8 November 14th Arabian Gulf Cup	Qatar	0–0	Bahrain	Riffa, Bahrain
--:-- UTC+3		Report		Stadium: Bahrain National Stadium

11 November 14th Arabian Gulf Cup	Qatar	0–0	Saudi Arabia	Riffa, Bahrain
--:-- UTC+3		Report		Stadium: Bahrain National Stadium

24 November Friendly	Thailand	0–0	Qatar	Bangkok, Thailand
--:-- UTC+7

26 November Friendly	Turkmenistan	4–1	Qatar	Bangkok, Thailand
--:-- UTC+7

3 December 1998 Asian Games	Qatar	2–1	Tajikistan	Suphanburi, Thailand
15:30 UTC+7	Al-Obaidly 31'; Mustafa 51'	Report	Jabborov 90' (pen.)	Stadium: Suphanburi Stadium

5 December 1998 Asian Games	Maldives	0–4	Qatar	Suphanburi, Thailand
15:30 UTC+7			Al-Kuwari 21', 41', 61', 68'	Stadium: Suphanburi Stadium

8 December 1998 Asian Games	Lebanon	0–1	Qatar	Bangkok, Thailand
15:00 UTC+7			Karim 56'	Stadium: Rajamangala Stadium

10 December 1998 Asian Games	Qatar	0–2	Kazakhstan	Bangkok, Thailand
15:00 UTC+7		Report	Zubarev 13'; Mirzabayev 88'	Stadium: Rajamangala Stadium

12 December 1998 Asian Games	Qatar	2–1	Thailand	Bangkok, Thailand
17:00 UTC+7	Mustafa 36'; Al-Shemmari 69'	Report	Surachai 34'	Stadium: Rajamangala Stadium

14 December 1998 Asian Games	Qatar	0–0 (a.e.t.) (1–3 p)	Kuwait	Bangkok, Thailand
17:00 UTC+7		Report		Stadium: Rajamangala Stadium
	Penalties
	Mustafa (penalty scored); Anwar (penalty missed); Al-Tamimi (penalty missed); Nahnak (penalty missed)		(penalty scored) Jasem; (penalty scored) S. Al-Buraiki; (penalty scored) Al-Shammari
