= 1985 Arab Cup =

4th Arab Cup, held in Saudi Arabia

Tournament details
- Host country: Saudi Arabia
- Dates: 3–12 July
- Teams: 6 (from 2 confederations)
- Venue: 1 (in 1 host city)

Final positions
- Champions: Iraq (3rd title)
- Runners-up: Bahrain
- Third place: Saudi Arabia
- Fourth place: Qatar

Tournament statistics
- Matches played: 10
- Goals scored: 21 (2.1 per match)
- Top scorer(s): (Iraq) Anad Abid (5 goals)
- Best player: (Saudi Arabia) Mohamed Abd Al-Jawad
- Best goalkeeper: (Bahrain) Mohammed Saleh
- Fair play award: Jordan

The 1985 Arab Cup was the fourth edition of the Arab Cup hosted by Ta'if, Saudi Arabia. The competition returned after nineteen years of absence and was the first one under the auspices of the Union of Arab Football Associations (UAFA). The defending champion Iraq won the title for the third consecutive time.

== Qualification ==
=== Zone 1 (Gulf Area) ===
Bahrain and Qatar qualified.

=== Zone 2 (Red Sea) ===
The tournament was held in Riyadh, Saudi Arabia.

Team	Pld	W	D	L	GF	GA	GD	Pts
Saudi Arabia	3	3	0	0	5	0	+5	6
Sudan	3	2	0	1	2	3	–1	4
Somalia	3	0	1	2	1	3	–2	1
South Yemen	3	0	1	2	1	3	–2	1

2 December 1983

Saudi Arabia	1–0	Somalia
Abdullah 72' (pen.)

Al-Malaz Stadium, Riyadh
2 December 1983

Sudan	1–0	South Yemen
Al-Nager

Al-Malaz Stadium, Riyadh

5 December 1983

Saudi Arabia	1–0	South Yemen
Al-Nafisah 36'

Al-Malaz Stadium, Riyadh
Referee: Saleh Adam (Sudan)
5 December 1983

Sudan	1–0	Somalia

Al-Malaz Stadium, Riyadh

9 December 1983

Saudi Arabia	3–0	Sudan
Al-Nafisah 24'; Abdullah 43', 69'

Al-Malaz Stadium, Riyadh
Referee: Abdel Kareem Abu Ayyash (Jordan)
9 December 1983

South Yemen	1–1	Somalia
Hashim		Abdi 17'

Al-Malaz Stadium, Riyadh

Saudi Arabia and Sudan qualified.

=== Zone 3 (North Africa) ===
Mauritania qualified automatically as the other North African teams (Algeria, Libya, Morocco and Tunisia) withdrew due to their participation in the 1986 FIFA World Cup qualifiers.

Mauritania qualified.

=== Zone 4 (East Region) ===
The tournament was held in Amman, Jordan.

Team	Pld	W	D	L	GF	GA	GD	Pts
Jordan	1	1	0	0	3	2	+1	2
Iraq	1	0	0	1	2	3	–1	0

18 May 1984

Jordan	3–2 (a.e.t.)	Iraq
Abu-Ahed 51'; Ibrahim 68'; Awad 93'		Saeed 43', 75'

Amman International Stadium, Amman

Jordan and Iraq qualified due to the withdrawal of the other teams in the group.

== Qualified teams ==
Sudan withdrew from the final tournament, while Iraq participated with its B team. The 6 qualified teams were:

Participants
Zone	Team
Zone 1 (Gulf Area)	Bahrain
Zone 1 (Gulf Area)	Qatar
Zone 2 (Red Sea)	Saudi Arabia (hosts)
Zone 3 (North Africa)	Mauritania
Zone 4 (East Region)	Iraq B
Zone 4 (East Region)	Jordan

== Venues ==
Ta’if	1985 Arab Cup is located in Saudi Arabia
King Fahd Stadium	1985 Arab Cup is located in Saudi Arabia
Capacity: 17,000	1985 Arab Cup is located in Saudi Arabia

== Group stage ==
=== Group A ===
Team	Pld	W	D	L	GF	GA	GD	Pts
Saudi Arabia	2	2	0	0	5	0	+5	4
Qatar	2	1	0	1	2	1	+1	2
Jordan	2	0	0	2	0	6	−6	0

3 July 1985

Saudi Arabia	4–0	Jordan
Nu'eimeh 45'; Azmi 49' (o.g.); Al-Musaibeah 58'; Al-Bishi 89'	Report

King Fahd Stadium, Taif
Referee: Nizar Watti (Syria)

5 July 1985

Qatar	2–0	Jordan
Khalfan 32'; Muftah 66'

King Fahd Stadium, Taif
Referee: Belaïd Lacarne (Algeria)

7 July 1985

Saudi Arabia	1–0	Qatar
Mohammad 61'	Report

King Fahd Stadium, Taif
Referee: Belaïd Lacarne (Algeria)

=== Group B ===
Team	Pld	W	D	L	GF	GA	GD	Pts
Bahrain	2	1	1	0	3	1	+2	3
Iraq B	2	1	1	0	3	1	+2	3
Mauritania	2	0	0	2	0	4	−4	0

4 July 1985

Iraq B	1–1	Bahrain
Abid 42'	Report	Eid 78'

King Fahd Stadium, Taif
Referee: Mohamed Larache (Morocco)

6 July 1985

Bahrain	2–0	Mauritania
Shwetar 15', 74'

King Fahd Stadium, Taif
Referee: Tahar Zaghlout (Libya)

8 July 1985

Iraq B	2–0	Mauritania
Mahmoud 42'; Abid 60'

King Fahd Stadium, Taif
Referee: Mohammed Senhoub (Yemen)

== Knock-out stage ==
Semi-finals
10 July 1985 – Taif
Iraq B	3
Saudi Arabia	2
10 July 1985 – Taif
Bahrain (p)	1 (3)
Qatar	1 (1)

Final
12 July 1985 – Taif
Iraq B	1
Bahrain	0
Third place
12 July 1985 – Taif
Saudi Arabia (p)	0 (3)
Qatar	0 (1)

=== Semi-finals ===
10 July 1985

Iraq B	3–2	Saudi Arabia
Abid 13', 18'; Rashid 28'	Report	Nu'eimeh 47' (pen.); Abd Al-Jawad 88'

King Fahd Stadium, Taif
Referee: Belaïd Lacarne (Algeria)

10 July 1985

Bahrain	1–1 (a.e.t.)	Qatar
Al-Harban 55'		Muftah 40'
Penalties
Hassan (penalty missed); Shwetar (penalty scored); Saif (penalty scored); Al-Harban (penalty scored)	3–1	(penalty scored) Al-Adsani; (penalty missed) Al Ammari; (penalty missed) Sabela; (penalty missed) Muftah

King Fahd Stadium, Taif
Referee: Abdul Aziz Al-Salmi (Kuwait)

=== Third place play-off ===
12 July 1985

Saudi Arabia	0–0 (a.e.t.)	Qatar
Penalties
Abd Al-Jawad (penalty scored); Al-Bishi (penalty scored); Al-Dosari (penalty scored); Khamees (penalty missed)	3–1	(penalty scored) Al-Adsani; (penalty missed) Anber; (penalty missed) Khalfan; (penalty missed) Zaid

King Fahd Stadium, Taif
Referee: Nizar Watti (Syria)

=== Final ===
12 July 1985

Iraq B	1–0	Bahrain
Abid 21'	Report

King Fahd Stadium, Taif
Referee: Abdul Aziz Al-Salmi (Kuwait)

== Goalscorers ==
There were 21 goals scored in 10 matches, for an average of 2.1 goals per match.

5 goals

- (Iraq) Anad Abid

2 goals

- (Bahrain) Waleed Shwetar
- (Qatar) Mansour Muftah
- (Saudi Arabia) Saleh Nu'eimeh

1 goal

- (Bahrain) Ebrahim Al-Harban
- (Bahrain) Khamis Eid
- (Iraq) Shaker Mahmoud
- (Iraq) Hameed Rashid
- (Qatar) Ibrahim Khalfan
- (Saudi Arabia) Ahmad Al-Bishi
- (Saudi Arabia) Fahad Al-Musaibeah
- (Saudi Arabia) Jamal Mohammad
- (Saudi Arabia) Mohamed Abd Al-Jawad

1 own goal

- (Bahrain) Hussam Azmi (vs Saudi Arabia)
