= Football at the 1988 Summer Olympics – Men's Asian Qualifiers =

Football at the Olympics qualification

The Pre-Olympic tournaments of the Asian Qualifiers for the 1988 Summer Olympic were held from 27 February 1987 to 15 January 1988. Iraq and China qualified, while South Korea qualified as host nation.

== West Asia ==
=== First Round ===
==== Group 1 ====
Team	Pld	W	D	L	GF	GA	GD	Pts
Saudi Arabia	4	4	0	0	8	1	+7	8
Bahrain	4	1	0	3	4	6	-2	2
Oman	4	1	0	3	2	7	-5	2

All Matches were played in Riyadh, Saudi Arabia.

16 April 1987

Bahrain	2–0	Oman

18 April 1987

Saudi Arabia	1–0	Oman
Majed Abdullah

20 April 1987

Saudi Arabia	2–0	Bahrain
Majed Abdullah 41', 61'

22 April 1987

Oman	2–1	Bahrain

24 April 1987

Oman	0–3	Saudi Arabia

26 April 1987

Bahrain	1–2	Saudi Arabia

==== Group 2 ====
Team	Pld	W	D	L	GF	GA	GD	Pts
Iraq	4	3	1	0	8	2	+6	7
United Arab Emirates	4	1	2	1	5	5	0	4
Jordan	4	0	1	3	2	8	-6	1

27 March 1987

Iraq	1–1	United Arab Emirates
Ahmed Radhi 20'		Fahad Khamees 93'

Kuwait City
3 April 1987

Jordan	1–1	United Arab Emirates
Abdul Karim Shadafan 83'		Ali Thani 48'

Amman
10 April 1987

United Arab Emirates	3–0	Jordan
Fahad Khamis; Abdullah Ali Sultan

Abu Dhabi
17 April 1987

Jordan	1–2	Iraq
Jamal Abu Abed 40'		Hussein Saeed 3'; Adnan Dirjal 86'

Amman
24 April 1987

Iraq	2–0	Jordan
Hussein Saeed 25'; Saad Qais 38'

Kuwait City
1 May 1987

United Arab Emirates	0–3	Iraq
		Natiq Hashim 40'; Ahmed Radhi 76'; Saad Qais 89'

Abu Dhabi

==== Group 3 ====
Team	Pld	W	D	L	GF	GA	GD	Pts
Qatar	2	1	0	1	2	1	+1	2
Syria	2	1	0	1	1	2	-1	2
South Yemen	Withdrew, apparently due to injuries to players.							

All Matches were played in Doha, Qatar.

17 April 1987

Qatar	2–0	Syria
Mansour Muftah; Adel Khamis

24 April 1987

Syria	0–3	Qatar
		Issa Ahmed; Mansour Muftah

Khalifa International Stadium, Doha, Qatar

==== Group 4 ====
Team	Pld	W	D	L	GF	GA	GD	Pts
Kuwait	2	1	0	1	2	2	0	2
Iran	2	1	0	1	2	2	0	2
North Yemen	Withdrew							

All Matches were played in Doha, Qatar.

27 February 1987

Iran	2–1	Kuwait
Bijan Taheri 64'; Karim Bavi 89'		Khalid Al-Shabib 76'

7 March 1987

Kuwait	1–0	Iran
Faisal Al-Dakheel 89' (pen.)

Kuwait qualified on away goals rule.

=== Second Round ===
Team	Pld	W	D	L	GF	GA	GD	Pts
Iraq	6	3	2	1	10	5	+5	8
Kuwait	6	2	3	1	3	2	+1	7
Qatar	6	1	3	2	4	8	-4	5
Saudi Arabia	6	0	4	2	2	4	-2	4

4 December 1987

Saudi Arabia	0–0	Iraq

Riyadh
4 December 1987

Qatar	0–0	Kuwait

Doha
11 December 1987

Qatar	1–3	Iraq
Khalid Salman 17' (pen.)		Hussein Saeed 41'; Ali Hussein 59'; Natiq Hashem 89'

Doha
11 December 1987

Kuwait	1–0	Saudi Arabia
Nasser Al-Ghanem 49'

Kuwait City
18 December 1987

Kuwait	2–1	Iraq
Wail Suleiman 6'; Abdulaziz Al-Hajiri 22'		Karim Mohammed Alawi 65'

Kuwait City
18 December 1987

Saudi Arabia	1–1	Qatar
Ahmad Jamel 48'		Issa Ahmed 61'

Riyadh
1 January 1988

Iraq	1–1	Saudi Arabia
Samir Shaker 51' (pen.)		Majed Abdullah 55'

Muscat
1 January 1988

Kuwait	0–0	Qatar

Kuwait City
8 January 1988

Iraq	4–1	Qatar
Khalil Mohammed Allawi 9'; Habib Jaafar 76'; Ahmed Radhi 16'; Ali Hussein 17'		Khalid Salman 79'

Muscat
8 January 1988

Saudi Arabia	0–0	Kuwait

Riyadh
15 January 1988

Iraq	1–0	Kuwait
Karim Mohammed Alawi 22'

Muscat
15 January 1988

Qatar	1–0	Saudi Arabia
Johar 85' (pen.)

Doha

== East Asia ==
=== First Round ===
==== Group 1 ====
Team	Pld	W	D	L	GF	GA	GD	Pts
Nepal	2	1	1	0	3	2	+1	3
Pakistan	2	0	1	1	2	3	-1	1
India	Withdrew (Note: India withdrew on 30th March 1987, as the government did not allow the team to compete, following a poor performance at the 1986 Asian Games)							

All Matches were played in Kathmandu, Nepal.

25 April 1987

Pakistan	2–2	Nepal
Sharafat 44', 89'		Ghale 2'; Thapa (?)

28 April 1987

Nepal	1–0	Pakistan
Pradhan 55'

==== Group 2 ====
Team	Pld	W	D	L	GF	GA	GD	Pts
Thailand	2	1	1	0	3	2	+1	3
Malaysia	2	0	1	1	2	3	-1	1
North Korea	Disqualified (Note: North Korea was originally drawn in this group, but it refused to play the qualifying matches in Malaysia, claiming that it had a right to automatic qualification to the finals, as it would supposedly be sharing the hosting duties with South Korea. FIFA ruled that North Korea was disqualified in June 1987, and they imposed a fine of several thousand Swiss Francs.)							

All Matches were played in Kuala Lumpur, Malaysia.

14 March 1987

Malaysia	0–1	Thailand
		Pichai Kongsri 7'

18 March 1987

Thailand	2–2	Malaysia
Ronachai Sayomchai 3'; Pichai Kongsri 26'		Ahmad Yusof 35'; Lim Teong Kim 55'

==== Group 3 ====
Team	Pld	W	D	L	GF	GA	GD	Pts
Japan	4	4	0	0	7	1	+6	8
Singapore	4	1	0	3	3	4	-1	2
Indonesia	4	1	0	3	3	8	-5	2
Brunei	Withdrew							

4 April 1987

Singapore	2–0	Indonesia
Fandi Ahmad 63'; V. Sundramoorthy 89'

Singapore
8 April 1987

Japan	3–0	Indonesia
Hiromi Hara 42'; Satoshi Tetsuka 62'; Nobuhiro Takeda 89'

Tokyo
12 April 1987

Japan	1–0	Singapore
Yoshiyuki Matsuyama 65'

Tokyo
26 April 1987

Indonesia	2–1	Singapore
Ribut Waidi 23'; Ricky Yacob 90'		Fandi Ahmad 55'

Jakarta
14 June 1987

Singapore	0–1	Japan
		Takashi Mizunuma 40'

Singapore
26 June 1987

Indonesia	1–2	Japan
Ricky Yacob 49'		Hiromi Hara 79'; Yoshiyuki Matsuyama 86'

Jakarta

==== Group 4 ====
Team	Pld	W	D	L	GF	GA	GD	Pts
China	4	3	1	0	20	0	+20	7
Hong Kong	4	2	1	1	12	1	+11	5
Philippines	4	0	0	4	0	31	-31	0

3 April 1987

Philippines	0–5	Hong Kong
		Tim Bredbury 10'; Lai Law-kau 40'; Chan Fat-chi 49'; Ku Kam-fai 75'; Lai Wing-cheung 89'

Hong Kong
6 April 1987

Philippines	postponed due to thunderstorms	Hong Kong

Hong Kong
10 April 1987
19:30(UTC+8)

Philippines	0–9	China
		Ma Lin 1', 21', 59'; Li Hui 8', 66', 77' (pen.); Liu Haiguang 42'; Qin Guorong 82'; Jia Xiuquan 85'

Guangdong Provincial People's Stadium, Guangzhou
13 April 1987
20:15(UTC+8)

China	10–0	Philippines
Ma Lin 21', 31', 38'; Antonio Castañeda 23' (o.g.); Jia Xiuquan 28', 48', 80'; Mai Chao 43', 74'; Liu Haiguang 85'

Guangdong Provincial People's Stadium, Guangzhou
Attendance: 1000
19 April 1987
16:00(UTC+8)

Hong Kong	0–0	China

Government Stadium, Hong Kong
Attendance: 24287
14 May 1987

Hong Kong	7–0	Philippines
Chan Fat-chi; Lai Wing-cheung; Wan; Lai Law-kau

20 May 1987
20:15(UTC+8)

China	1–0	Hong Kong
Tang Yaodong 47'

Guangzhou

=== Second Round ===
Team	Pld	W	D	L	GF	GA	GD	Pts
China	6	5	0	1	25	1	+24	10
Japan	6	4	1	1	16	2	+14	9
Thailand	6	2	1	3	5	5	0	5
Nepal	6	0	0	6	1	39	-38	0

2 September 1987

Thailand	0–0	Japan

Bangkok
15 September 1987

Nepal	0–5	Japan
		Yasuhiko Okudera 16'; Satoshi Tetsuka 18'; Hisashi Kato 20'; Toshio Matsuura 74'; Yoshiyuki Matsuyama 82'

Tokyo
18 September 1987

Japan	9–0	Nepal
Toshio Matsuura 2', 21', 70'; Hisashi Kaneko 9'; Hiromi Hara 26', 28', 32'; Hisashi Kato 43'; Kazuo Echigo 83'

Tokyo
23 September 1987
19:00(UTC+8)

Nepal	0–8	China
		Wang Baoshan 14', 41', 78'; Li Hui 44', 47', 88' (pen.); Zhu Ping 56'; Duan Ju 76'

Shenyang People`s Stadium,Shenyang
26 September 1987

Japan	1–0	Thailand
Takashi Mizunuma 34'

Tokyo
26 September 1987

China	12–0	Nepal
Duan Ju 2', 52'; Ma Lin 18', 82'; Jia Xiuquan 22', 46'; Tang Yaodong 40'; Wang Baoshan 47', 49', 76'; Li Hui 55'; Mai Chao 85'

Shenyang People`s Stadium,Shenyang
Attendance: 17000
1 October 1987

Thailand	3–0	Nepal
Pichitpol Uthaikul 53', 80'; Vitoon Kijmongkolsak 78'

Bangkok
4 October 1987

Nepal	1–2	Thailand
Unknown 28'		Boonphob Praphut

Bangkok
4 October 1987
19:40(UTC+8)

China	0–1	Japan
		Hiromi Hara 21'

Tianhe Stadium, Guangzhou
Attendance: 60000
11 October 1987
18:00(UTC+7)

Thailand	0–1	China
		Ma Lin 19'

Suphachalasai Stadium, Bangkok
18 October 1987
19:40(UTC+8)

China	2–0	Thailand
Liu Haiguang 1'; Tang Yaodong 5'

Tianhe Stadium, Guangzhou
26 October 1987
19:00(UTC+9)

Japan	0–2	China
		Liu Haiguang 38'; Tang Yaodong 83'

National Stadium, Tokyo
Attendance: 50000

== Qualified teams ==
The following two teams from AFC qualified for the final tournament.

Team	Qualified as	Qualified on	Previous appearances in Summer Olympics
China	East Asia winners	26 October 1987	2 (1936, 1948)
Iraq	West Asia winners	15 January 1988	2 (1980, 1984)
