= Mohammed Al-Sowaidi =

Qatari footballer (born 1962)

Mohammed Daham
Personal information
- Full name: Mohammed Daham Faraj Al-Suwaidi
- Date of birth: 25 June 1962 (age 64)
- Place of birth: Doha, Qatar
- Height: 1.68 m (5 ft 6 in)
- Position: Defender

Youth career
- Al-Arabi

Senior career*
Years	Team	Apps	(Gls)
1979–1998	Al-Arabi		

International career
1983–1996	Qatar	57	(3)
- * Club domestic league appearances and goals

Mohammed Daham Faraj Al-Suwaidi (born 25 June 1962) is a Qatari football defender who played for Qatar in the 1984 Asian Cup.

== Club career ==
Daham played for Al-Arabi throughout his entire career, winning numerous Qatari League, Emir Cup, Sheikh Jassim Cup, titles.

== International career ==
Daham was selected for Qatar in 1983, He started playing regularly in the 1984 Summer Olympics, 1984 Gulf Cup and in the 1984 AFC Asian Cup. He then participated in the 1986 FIFA World Cup qualification as well as the 1986 Gulf Cup, and 1986 Asian Games. He was praised for his performances at these tournaments reaching the peak of his international career.

Daham last played for Qatar in the 1988 AFC Asian Cup, and the 1990 FIFA World Cup qualification.
