= Mohamed Al Ammari =

Qatari footballer and coach (born 1965)

Personal information
- Date of birth: 10 December 1965 (age 60)
- Place of birth: Doha, Qatar
- Height: 1.72 m (5 ft 8 in)
- Position: Midfielder

Youth career
- 1977–1983: Al Sadd

Senior career*
Years	Team	Apps	(Gls)
1983–1991	Al Sadd		

International career
1983–1990	Qatar		

Managerial career
- 2005–2006: Al Sadd
- 2007–2011: El Jaish
- * Club domestic league appearances and goals

Mohamed Al Ammari (Arabic: محمد خليفة العماري; born 10 December 1965) is a Qatari football coach and a former midfielder who played for the Qatar and Al Sadd, He also played in the 1984 Asian Cup. And also competed in the men's tournament at the 1984 Summer Olympics.

== Club career ==
Al-Ammari joined Al Sadd's youth teams in 1977, before moving to their senior team in 1983. He was an integral part in winning Qatari League for Al Sadd on multiple occasions. Due to injuries he had to retire at the age of 26.

== International career ==
Al-Ammari made his debut at the 1984 Olympics Qualifiers, The following year he played at the 1984 Olympics, 1984 Asian Cup, and the 1984 Gulf Cup. In 1988, He played at the 1988 Asian Cup and the 1988 Gulf Cup. He made his final appearances for the national team at the 1990 Gulf Cup.

== Coaching career ==
In 1999, He trained Al Sadd's youth teams and served as the assistant coach on multiple occasions, to head coaches Rabah Madjer, Džemaludin Mušović, René Meulensteen and Bora Milutinović. After the departure of Milutinović, he was appointed as the head coach in October 2005. He served until May of 2006. He would later become the first ever coach of El Jaish, coaching the team from 2007 until 2011, eventually getting sacked after winning the team promotion to the Qatar Stars League.
