= Saleh Al-Mehaizaa =

Qatari footballer (born 1965)

Saleh Eid
Personal information
- Full name: Saleh Eid Al-Mehaizaa
- Date of birth: 8 October 1965 (age 61)
- Place of birth: Doha, Qatar
- Height: 1.70 m (5 ft 7 in)
- Position: Midfielder

Senior career*
Years	Team	Apps	(Gls)
1983–1993	Al Shamal		

International career
1984–1989	Qatar	17	(4)
- * Club domestic league appearances and goals

Saleh Eid Al-Mehaizaa (Arabic: صالح عيد المهيزع born 8 October 1965) is a former Qatari footballer, who played for Al Shamal and the Qatar national team. He competed in the men's tournament at the 1984 Summer Olympics.

== Club career ==
Saleh played for Al-Shamal, helping them earn promotion in to the first division of the Qatar football league in the 1985–86 season.

== International career ==
Saleh was first selected to play for the Qatar national team in 1984. The same year he played in the 1984 Gulf Cup, 1984 Asian Cup, and in the 1984 Olympics. In 1986, He participated in the 1986 World Cup qualifiers as well as the 1986 Gulf Cup. He was also present at the 1990 World Cup qualifiers.
