= Adnan Al Talyani =

Emirati footballer (born 1964)

Adnan Khamees Al-Talyani
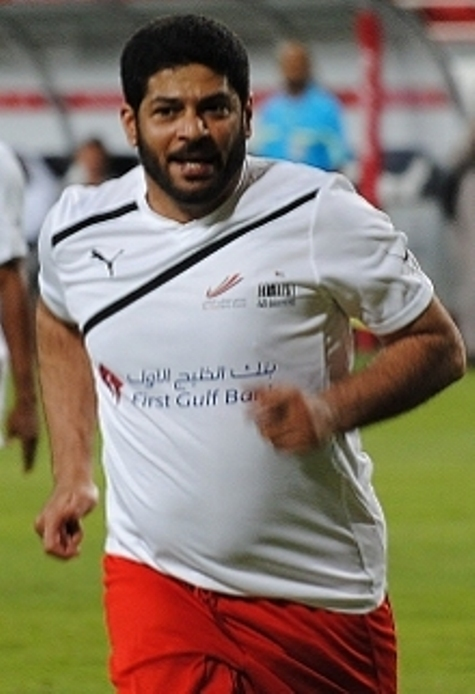

Personal information
- Full name: Adnan Khamis Mohammed Obaid Al-Talyani Al-Suwaidi
- Date of birth: 30 October 1964 (age 61)
- Place of birth: Sharjah, Trucial States
- Height: 1.76 m (5 ft 9 1/2 in)
- Position: Forward

Senior career*
Years	Team	Apps	(Gls)
1979–1999	Al-Shaab	563	(133)

International career
1982–1997	United Arab Emirates	161	(52)
Medal record
Men's football
Representing United Arab Emirates
AFC Asian Cup
Runner-up	1996 AFC Asian Cup
WAFF U-18 Championship
Winner	1982 WAFF U-18 Championship
Arabian Gulf Cup
Runner-up	1986 Arabian Gulf Cup
Runner-up	1988 Arabian Gulf Cup
Runner-up	1994 Arabian Gulf Cup
- * Club domestic league appearances and goals

Adnan Khamis Mohammed Obaid Al-Talyani Al-Suwaidi (Arabic: عَدْنَان خَمِيس مُحَمَّد عُبَيْد الطَّلْيَانِيّ السُّوَيْدِيّ; born 30 October 1964) is a retired footballer from the United Arab Emirates who played as a forward for the country's Pro Football League, Al-Shaab CSC, and the national team. He is considered one of the best football players and goal scorers in the history of the UAE League and the national team.

== Early and personal life ==
Adnan was born in Sharjah, United Arab Emirates, on 30 October 1964. He started playing football in the streets of Sharjah in the 1970s. His older brother, Nasser Al Talyani, was a midfielder for the Al-Shaab CSC team. In 1980, he joined the team after impressing the owner at an annual football tournament where he scored several goals.

He has three sons, all of whom attended his retirement party in 2003.

== Career ==
Talyani spent 19 years at Al-Shaab CSC. Despite having received multiple offers from other clubs, restrictions in his contract prohibited him from transferring at the time. He was chosen for the UAE national team soon after Heshmat Mohajerani was hired as the trainer. He retired from international football in 1997, with the record for the most international appearances, with 161 caps and 56 goals.

=== 1990 FIFA World Cup Qualification ===
The United Arab Emirates' qualification for the 1990 FIFA World Cup remains one of the most significant achievements in the history of Emirati football, and Adnan Al Talyani played a pivotal role in the same. The UAE faced a challenging qualification process, beginning with a crucial first-round encounter against Kuwait. After a 3–2 defeat in the opening match, the team entered the third game of the stage needing a victory to stay in contention. Al Talyani scored the decisive goal in a 1–0 win, moving the team to the top of the group. He then contributed to a 4–1 victory over Pakistan, securing progression to the final qualification round.

The final stage featured six teams competing in a single-round tournament, with the top two earning places at the World Cup. The UAE managed only one victory in this stage, a 2–1 win over China, with an 88th-minute goal from Al Talyani. His second goal of the round came in a 1–1 draw with South Korea in the final match, earning the UAE the sixth point needed to qualify alongside them for the nation’s first World Cup appearance.

Al Talyani went on to represent the UAE in matches against Colombia, West Germany, and Yugoslavia.

=== 1996 AFC Asian Cup ===
Six years after their historic qualification for the 1990 FIFA World Cup, the United Arab Emirates prepared to host the 1996 AFC Asian Cup in their country for the first time. The team featured members from the “Generation of 1990,” including Adnan Al Talyani and the goalkeeper Muhsin Musabah, with emerging talents such as Munther Ali Abdullah. At 32 years of age, Al Talyani played a key role in their performance, scoring two goals: one in a 3–2 victory over Kuwait, regarded as one of the most memorable goals in the nation's football history, and another in a 2–0 win against Indonesia.

The UAE advanced to the final, where they faced Saudi Arabia before a crowd of 60,000 at Zayed Sports City Stadium in Abu Dhabi. Saudi Arabia, two-time Asian champions and runners-up in 1992, held the hosts to a goalless draw through regular and extra time. Having played the full 90 minutes in the semi-final against Kuwait, Al Talyani was substituted during extra time due to fatigue. The match was ultimately decided by a penalty shoot-out, in which Saudi Arabia claimed their third Asian Cup title.

== Honours ==
Al Shaab

- UAE President's Cup (1992–93)
- UAE Super Cup (1993)
- 2x UAE First Division League (1992–93, 1997–98)
- Asian Cup Winners' Cup Runners-up (1994–95)

=== United Arab Emirates ===
- AFC Asian Cup Runners-up (1996)

Individual

- 2x UAE Football League Top Scorer (1984–85, 1986–87)
- Asian Cup Winners' Cup Best Player (1994–95)
- Best Arabic Player (1989)
- UAE First Division League Top Scorer (1992–93)
- UAE Football League Best Player (1992–93)
- UAE Player of the Century

== Career statistics ==
=== International goals ===
#	Date	Venue	Opponent	Score	Result	Competition
1	14 August 1982	Kuala Lumpur	Indonesia	1–1	2–1	Merdeka Tournament
2	14 August 1982	Kuala Lumpur	Indonesia	2–1	2–1	Merdeka Tournament
3	10 October 1983	Riyadh	Iraq	1–1	2–2	1984 Summer Olympics AFC qualification
4	10 October 1983	Riyadh	Iraq	2–2	2–2	1984 Summer Olympics AFC qualification
5	14 November 1983	Riyadh	Bahrain	1–1	1–2	Friendly match
6	10 March 1984	Royal Oman Police Stadium, Muscat	Kuwait	1–0	2–0	1984 Gulf Cup
7	12 March 1984	Royal Oman Police Stadium, Muscat	Qatar	1–0	1–0	1984 Gulf Cup
8	24 October 1984	Jeddah	Oman	4–0	8–0	1984 AFC Asian Cup qualification
9	24 October 1984	Jeddah	Oman	6–0	8–0	1984 AFC Asian Cup qualification
10	26 October 1984	Jeddah	Nepal	3–0	11–0	1984 AFC Asian Cup qualification
11	26 October 1984	Jeddah	Nepal	7–0	11–0	1984 AFC Asian Cup qualification
12	26 October 1984	Jeddah	Nepal	9–0	11–0	1984 AFC Asian Cup qualification
13	28 October 1984	Jeddah	Sri Lanka	1–0	5–1	1984 AFC Asian Cup qualification
14	28 October 1984	Jeddah	Sri Lanka	3–0	5–1	1984 AFC Asian Cup qualification
15	28 October 1984	Jeddah	Sri Lanka	4–1	5–1	1984 AFC Asian Cup qualification
16	4 December 1984	Jalan Besar Stadium, Singapore	India	1–0	2–0	1984 Asian Cup
17	7 April 1985	Bahrain	Syria	1–0	4–0	Friendly match
18	7 April 1985	Bahrain	Syria	2–0	4–0	Friendly match
19	5 August 1985	Bahrain	Algeria	1–0	1–0	Friendly tournament
20	20 September 1985	Al-Rashid Stadium, Dubai	Iraq	1–0	2–3	1986 World Cup qualification
21	27 September 1985	King Fahd Stadium, Taif Iraq	Iraq	2–0	2–1	1986 World Cup qualification
22	24 March 1986	Bahrain National Stadium, Manama	Iraq	2–2	2–2	1986 Gulf Cup
23	2 April 1986	Bahrain National Stadium, Manama	Saudi Arabia	2–0	2–0	1986 Gulf Cup
24	7 April 1986	Bahrain National Stadium, Manama	Qatar	2–0	2–3	1986 Gulf Cup
25	21 September 1986	Daegu Stadium, Daegu	Pakistan	1–0	1–0	1986 Asian Games
26	23 September 1986	Daegu Stadium, Daegu	Thailand	2–1	2–1	1986 Asian Games
27	25 September 1986	Daegu Stadium, Daegu	Iraq	1–0	1–0	1986 Asian Games
28	30 January 1988	Abu Dhabi	Japan	1–0	2–0	Friendly match
29	7 February 1988	Abu Dhabi	North Yemen	2–0	2–1	1988 AFC Asian Cup qualification
30	13 February 1988	Abu Dhabi	India	2–0	3–0	1988 AFC Asian Cup qualification
31	17 March 1988	King Fahd Stadium, Riyadh	Oman	1–0	1–0	1988 Gulf Cup
32	17 November 1988	Sharjah Stadium, Sharjah	Jordan	2–0	2–1	Friendly match
33	3 February 1989	Sharjah Stadium, Sharjah	Kuwait	1–0	1-0	1990 World Cup qualification
34	10 February 1989	Islamabad	Pakistan	3–0	4–1	1990 World Cup qualification
35	17 October 1989	National Stadium, Singapore	China	2–1	2–1	1990 World Cup qualification
36	28 October 1989	Darul Makmur Stadium, Kuantan	South Korea	1–1	1–1	1990 World Cup qualification
37	14 Feb 1990	Al Maktoum Stadium, Dubai	Sweden	2–1	2–1	Friendly match
38	30 May 1992	Al Ain	Bahrain	3–0	3–1	1992 Asian Cup qualification
39	20 February 1993	Dubai	Bulgaria	1–3	1–3	Friendly match
40	8 April 1993	Kyoto, Japan	Sri Lanka	2–0	4-0	1994 World Cup qualification
41	28 April 1993	Dubai	Sri Lanka	2–0	3-0	1994 World Cup qualification
42	30 April 1993	Dubai	Thailand	2–0	2-1	1994 World Cup qualification
43	3 May 1993	Dubai	Bangladesh	1–0	7-0	1994 World Cup qualification
44	3 May 1993	Dubai	Bangladesh	6–0	7-0	1994 World Cup qualification
45	3 October 1994	Athletic Stadium, Miyoshi	Japan	1–0	1-1	1994 Asian Games
46	5 October 1994	Hiroshima Stadium, Hiroshima	Myanmar	1–0	2-0	1994 Asian Games
47	5 October 1994	Hiroshima Stadium, Hiroshima	Myanmar	2–0	2-0	1994 Asian Games
48	9 October 1994	Bingo Athletic Stadium, Onomichi	Qatar	2–2	2-2	1994 Asian Games
49	11 October 1994	Regional Park Stadium, Hiroshima	Kuwait	1–1	1-2	1994 Asian Games
50	3 November 1994	Zayed Sports City Stadium, Abu Dhabi	Qatar	1–0	2–0	1994 Gulf Cup
51	9 November 1994	Zayed Sports City Stadium, Abu Dhabi	Kuwait	2–0	2–0	1994 Gulf Cup
52	19 March 1996	Dubai	South Korea	2–2	3–2	Friendly match
53	22 October 1996	Sultan Qaboos Sports Complex, Muscat	Kuwait	2–1	2–1	1996 Gulf Cup
54	19 November 1996	Abu Dhabi	Uzbekistan	2–1	4–2	Friendly match
55	19 November 1996	Abu Dhabi	Uzbekistan	3–1	4–2	Friendly match
56	19 November 1996	Abu Dhabi	Uzbekistan	4–1	4–2	Friendly match
57	26 November 1996	Abu Dhabi	Syria	1–1	1–1	Friendly match
58	7 December 1996	Zayed Sports City Stadium, Abu Dhabi	Kuwait	2–2	3–2	1996 Asian Cup
59	10 December 1996	Zayed Sports City Stadium, Abu Dhabi	Indonesia	2–0	2–0	1996 Asian Cup
X	1 April 1997	Abu Dhabi	Nepal	2–0	4–0	Unofficial friendly
X	1 April 1997	Abu Dhabi	Nepal	4–0	4–0	Unofficial friendly
60	26 April 1997	Sharjah Stadium, Sharjah	Jordan	1–0	2–0	1998 World Cup qualification
61	27 September 1997	Zayed Sports City Stadium, Abu Dhabi	Uzbekistan	3–1	3–2	1998 World Cup qualification
62	17 December 1997	King Fahd International Stadium, Riyadh	Czech Republic	1–6	1–6	1997 Confederations Cup

== Legacy ==
Al Talyani’s contribution to the 1990 FIFA World Cup and the 1996 AFC Asian Cup Final victories has made him one of the continent’s greatest icons in the sport.

== Retirement ==
Talyani officially retired from football in January 2003. A testimonial match was played in his honour between Italian champions Juventus and an All-Star team of players from various countries. He has since been named the UAE's Player of the Century.

== See also ==
- List of men's footballers with 100 or more international caps
- List of men's footballers with 50 or more international goals
- Asian Footballer of the Year
- List of one-club men
