= Hiromi Hara =

Japanese footballer and manager

Hiromi Hara 原 博実
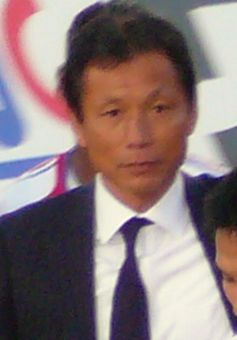

Personal information
- Full name: Hiromi Hara
- Date of birth: October 19, 1958 (age 68)
- Place of birth: Nasushiobara, Tochigi, Japan
- Height: 1.83 m (6 ft 0 in)
- Position: Forward

Youth career
- 1974–1976: Yaita Higashi High School

College career
Years	Team	Apps	(Gls)
1977–1980	Waseda University		

Senior career*
Years	Team	Apps	(Gls)
1981–1992	Mitsubishi Motors	192	(65)
Total		192	(65)

International career
1978–1988	Japan	75	(37)

Managerial career
- 1998–1999: Urawa Reds
- 2002–2005: FC Tokyo
- 2007: FC Tokyo
- 2010: Japan (caretaker)
Medal record
Mitsubishi Motors
Winner	Japan Soccer League	1982
Winner	JSL Cup	1981
- * Club domestic league appearances and goals

Hiromi Hara (原 博実, Hara Hiromi; born October 19, 1958) is a former Japanese football player and manager. He played for Japan national team. He also managed Japan national team as caretaker.

== Club career ==
Hara was born in Nasushiobara on October 19, 1958. After graduating from Waseda University, he joined Mitsubishi Motors (later Urawa Reds) in 1981 as a forward. The club won 1981 JSL Cup and 1982 Japan Soccer League. He played as a regular player from first season and played in all matches in the league until 1988. After that, club performance was not good, he also played in Division 2. He retired in 1992. He played 192 games and scored 65 goals in the league.

== National team career ==
On November 19, 1978, when Hara was a Waseda University student, he debuted for Japan national team against Soviet Union. He also played at 1978 Asian Games and 1982 World Cup qualification in 1980. From 1981, he played most matches of Japan national team until 1988. He played 75 games and scored 37 goals for Japan until 1987. He was known for his headers and was aptly nicknamed the "Asian Nuclear Warhead".

== Coaching career ==
=== Urawa Reds ===
Hara retired from playing career in 1992 and began his new career as the coach of the youth team of his old club, which had been renamed by this point as Urawa Reds. In 1998 Hara became the manager of Urawa's top squad. Initially he saw success, with the team achieving a 3rd place finish for J.League's second stage in 1998. However, during J.League's first stage of 1999, the team finished 13th in the standings and Hara was released.

Following his release from Urawa, Hara travelled to Spain to study the coaching methods applied by several La Liga clubs. Upon returning to Japan, he spent two years working as a commentator for Sky PerfecTV!.

=== FC Tokyo ===
In 2002 Hara decided to return to coaching as the manager of FC Tokyo. He brought youngsters such as Naohiro Ishikawa, Teruyuki Moniwa and Akira Kaji, introduced Spanish-style tactics into the young and fresh team, and won J.League Cup in 2004. Hara was released from his position as manager of the club in 2005. However in 2007 he was re-appointed as the club's manager, but was again released only after one season.

=== Japan national team ===
On 12 February 2009, Hara was appointed by Japan Football Association as its new technical director for the Japan national team, responsible for strengthening the national team. After fellow Waseda alumnus Takeshi Okada stepped down after leading Japan to a lauded performance at the 2010 World Cup, Hara was given the responsibility for finding his replacement, which was revealed in late August after protracted negotiations in Europe to be the Italian manager Alberto Zaccheroni. He also took charge in a caretaker capacity for the friendlies against Paraguay, leading Japan to a 1-0 win, and Guatemala, both of which were held at his former hunting ground in Saitama Stadium 2002.

== Club statistics ==
Club performance			League		Cup		League Cup		Total	
Season	Club	League	Apps	Goals	Apps	Goals	Apps	Goals	Apps	Goals
Japan			League		Emperor's Cup		JSL Cup		Total	
1981	Mitsubishi Motors	JSL Division 1	18	4					18	4
1982	Mitsubishi Motors	JSL Division 1	18	7					18	7
1983	Mitsubishi Motors	JSL Division 1	18	3					18	3
1984	Mitsubishi Motors	JSL Division 1	18	8					18	8
1985/86	Mitsubishi Motors	JSL Division 1	22	10					22	10
1986/87	Mitsubishi Motors	JSL Division 1	22	8					22	8
1987/88	Mitsubishi Motors	JSL Division 1	22	10					22	10
1988/89	Mitsubishi Motors	JSL Division 1	18	3					18	3
1989/90	Mitsubishi Motors	JSL Division 2	16	9			1	0	17	9
1990/91	Mitsubishi Motors	JSL Division 1	18	3	0	0	1	0	19	3
1991/92	Mitsubishi Motors	JSL Division 1	2	0			1	0	3	0
Total			192	65	0	0	3	0	195	65

== National team statistics ==
Japan national team
Year	Apps	Goals
1978	6	1
1979	2	0
1980	5	2
1981	10	1
1982	6	3
1983	10	6
1984	7	5
1985	10	5
1986	6	7
1987	11	7
1988	2	0
Total	75	37

== International goals ==
No.	Date	Venue	Opponent	Score	Result	Competition
1.	13 December 1978	Bangkok, Thailand	Bahrain	3–0	4–0	1978 Asian Games
2.	9 June 1980	Guangzhou, China	Hong Kong	2–?	3–1	Friendly
3.	18 June 1980	Guangzhou, China	Hong Kong	1–0	2–0	Friendly
4.	8 September 1981	Kuala Lumpur, Malaysia	United Arab Emirates	2–?	3–2	1981 Merdeka Tournament
5.	23 November 1982	New Delhi, India	South Yemen	1–1	3–1	1982 Asian Games
6.	23 November 1982	New Delhi, India	South Yemen	2–1	3–1	1982 Asian Games
7.	25 November 1982	New Delhi, India	South Korea	1–1	2–1	1982 Asian Games
8.	12 February 1983	Damascus, Syria	Syria	1–?	2–2	Friendly
9.	12 February 1983	Damascus, Syria	Syria	2–?	2–2	Friendly
10.	4 September 1983	Tokyo, Japan	Philippines	1–0	7–0	1984 Summer Olympics qualifiers
11.	7 September 1983	Tokyo, Japan	Philippines	4–0	10–1	1984 Summer Olympics qualifiers
12.	15 September 1983	Tokyo, Japan	Chinese Taipei	1–0	2–0	1984 Summer Olympics qualifiers
13.	25 September 1983	Auckland, New Zealand	New Zealand	1–0	1–3	1984 Summer Olympics qualifiers
14.	6 March 1984	Bandar Seri Begawan, Brunei	Brunei	?–?	7–1	Friendly
15.	6 March 1984	Bandar Seri Begawan, Brunei	Brunei	?–?	7–1	Friendly
16.	18 April 1984	Kallang, Singapore	Malaysia	1–2	1–2	1984 Summer Olympics qualifiers
17.	21 April 1984	Kallang, Singapore	Iraq	1–1	1–2	1984 Summer Olympics qualifiers
18.	26 April 1984	Kallang, Singapore	Qatar	1–1	1–2	1984 Summer Olympics qualifiers
19.	23 February 1985	Kallang, Singapore	Singapore	3–1	3–1	1986 FIFA World Cup qualification
20.	21 March 1985	Tokyo, Japan	North Korea	1–0	1–0	1986 FIFA World Cup qualification
21.	18 May 1985	Tokyo, Japan	Singapore	4–0	5–0	1986 FIFA World Cup qualification
22.	11 August 1985	Kobe, Japan	Hong Kong	2–0	3–0	1986 FIFA World Cup qualification
23.	22 September 1985	Causeway Bay, Hong Kong	Hong Kong	2–1	2–1	1986 FIFA World Cup qualification
24.	25 July 1986	Kuala Lumpur, Malaysia	Syria	2–?	2–1	1986 Merdeka Tournament
25.	1 August 1986	Kuala Lumpur, Malaysia	Malaysia	1–0	1–2 (a.e.t.)	1986 Merdeka Tournament
26.	20 September 1986	Daejeon, South Korea	Nepal	2–0	5–0	1986 Asian Games
27.	20 September 1986	Daejeon, South Korea	Nepal	5–0	5–0	1986 Asian Games
28.	28 September 1986	Daejeon, South Korea	Bangladesh	1–0	4–0	1986 Asian Games
29.	28 September 1986	Daejeon, South Korea	Bangladesh	2–0	4–0	1986 Asian Games
30.	28 September 1986	Daejeon, South Korea	Bangladesh	3–0	4–0	1986 Asian Games
31.	8 April 1987	Tokyo, Japan	Indonesia	1–0	3–0	1988 Summer Olympics qualifiers
32.	27 May 1987	Hiroshima, Japan	Senegal	1–?	2–2	Friendly
33.	26 June 1987	Jakarta, Indonesia	Indonesia	1–1	2–1	1988 Summer Olympics qualifiers
34.	18 September 1987	Tokyo, Japan	Nepal	4–0	9–0	1988 Summer Olympics qualifiers
35.	18 September 1987	Tokyo, Japan	Nepal	5–0	9–0	1988 Summer Olympics qualifiers
36.	18 September 1987	Tokyo, Japan	Nepal	6–0	9–0	1988 Summer Olympics qualifiers
37.	4 October 1987	Guangzhou, China	China	1–0	1–0	1988 Summer Olympics qualifiers

== Managerial statistics ==
As of match played 7 September 2010

Managerial record by team and tenure
Team	Nat	From	To	Record				
Team	Nat	From	To	G	W	D	L	Win %
Urawa Red Diamonds	(Japan)	1 February 1998	30 June 1999	55	28	6	21	50.91
FC Tokyo	(Japan)	1 February 2002	19 December 2005	162	66	44	52	40.74
FC Tokyo	(Japan)	7 December 2006	31 January 2008	45	20	4	21	44.44
Japan (caretaker)	(Japan)	2 July 2010	9 September 2010	2	2	0	0	100.00
Career Total				264	116	54	94	43.94
