= Ibrahim Khalfan =

Qatari footballer (born 1961)

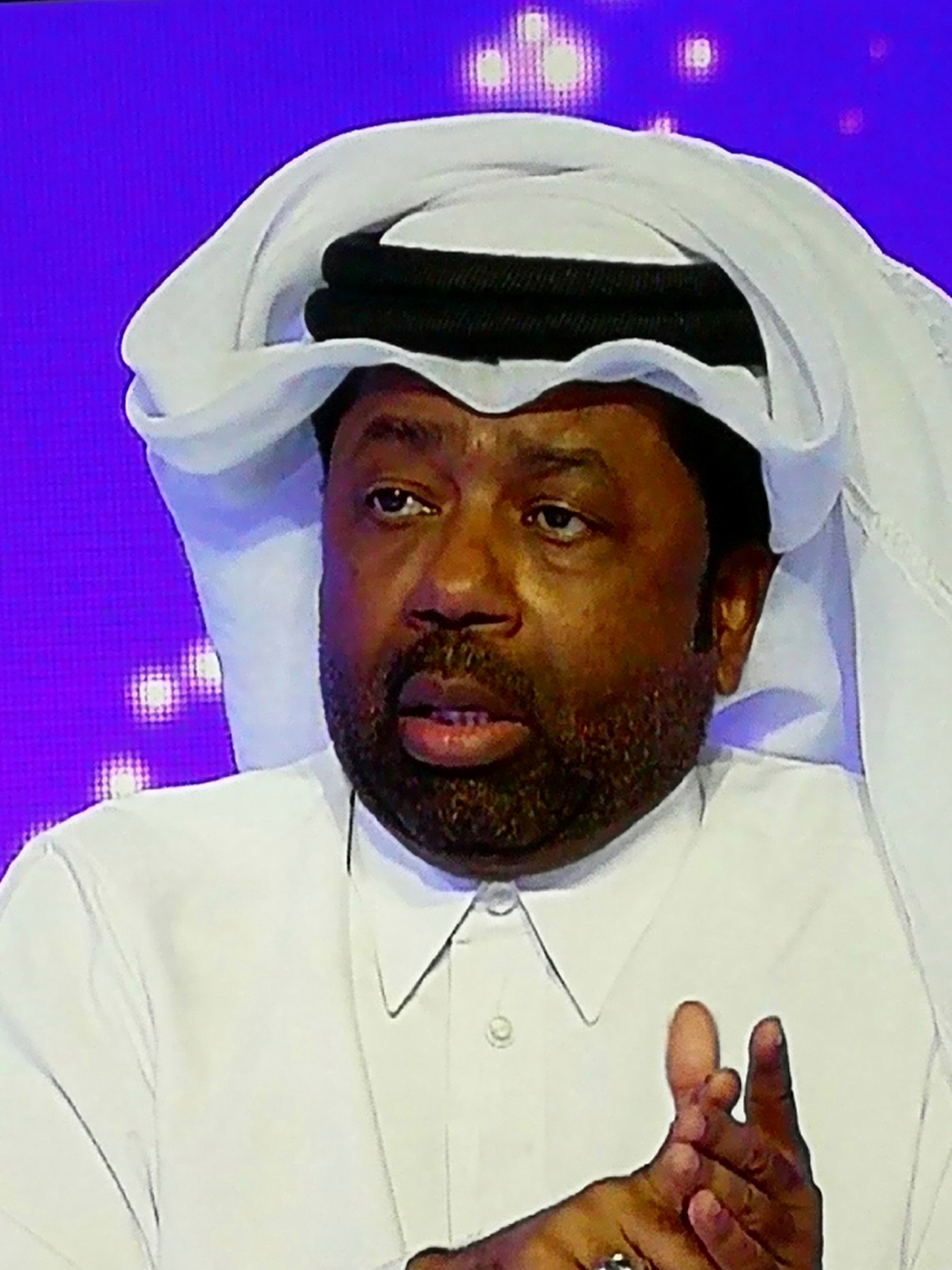
- Khalfan in 2017

Personal information
- Full name: Ibrahim Khalfan Ahmed Al-Khalfan
- Date of birth: 25 November 1961 (age 64)
- Place of birth: Doha, Qatar
- Height: 1.75 m (5 ft 9 in)
- Positions: Striker; midfielder

Youth career
- 1972–1979: Al Arabi

Senior career*
Years	Team	Apps	(Gls)
1980–1998	Al Arabi	100+	(10+)

International career
1981	Qatar U20	3	(0)
1981–1998	Qatar	20+	(9)
1984	Qatar Olympic	3	(0)
- * Club domestic league appearances and goals

Ibrahim Khalfan Al Khalfan (Arabic: إبراهيم خلفان; born 25 November 1961) is a retired Qatari international footballer who played as a winger for Al Arabi. He competed in the men's tournament at the 1984 Summer Olympics. After retirement from football, he worked as pundit at beIN SPORTS and ambassador to the 2022 FIFA World Cup hosted in Qatar.

== Club career ==
In 1972, Khalfan joined Al-Arabi's youth academy, eventually being promoted to the senior team in 1980. He represented Al-Arabi from 1980 to 1998, playing a key role in the club’s success during that period. He helped Al-Arabi win the Emir Cup three times in a row between 1977 and 1979. Notably, he scored a brace in the 1977/78 Emir Cup final and found the net again in the 1988 final.

== International career ==
Khalfan also represented the Qatar national team in the 1980s, as well as representing the Youth National Team in the 1981 FIFA World Youth Championship and also helping them achieve runners-up in the 1980 AFC Youth Tournament. On the senior level he played in the 1984 Summer Olympics and the 1982 Gulf Cup where he was admired for his performance, in the next Tournament held scored a goal against rivals Saudi in the 21' minute eventually winning the game. Khalfan also scored against Syria in the 7' minute at the 1984 AFC Asian Cup. He played some of his last games for the national team in the 1985 Arab Cup, 1986 Gulf Cup, and the 1986 Asian Games, He also appeared in a match against Bangladesh in 1998, which was his last game for Qatar.

== Personal life ==
He is the father of Khalfan Ibrahim Al Khalfan, a former footballer who played for Al Sadd and the Qatar national team. He is also an artist who loves music, and is skilled at playing the organ and accordion, and is skilled at drawing and Arabic calligraphy, and he combined them in his calligraphic paintings. He has also worked as a pundit at beIN SPORTS and ambassador to the 2022 FIFA World Cup hosted in Qatar.

== Legacy ==
Khalfan is remembered to be a fast, strong, and agile winger, Khalfan was an important pillar of Arabi's success at the Emir Cup, helping them win the title numerous times throughout his entire career. To remember him, Aspire Zone Pitch 2, was named after him for the FIFA U-17 World Cup.

== Honours ==
=== Club ===
- Al-Arabi
  - Qatari League: 1982–83, 1984–85
  - Emir Cup: 1977–78, 1978–79, 1979–80, 1982–83, 1983–84, 1988–89, 1989–90
    - Runners-up: 1982–83, 1986–87, 1992–93
  - Sheikh Jassim Cup: 1980, 1982

=== International ===
- Youth World Cup
  - Runner-up: 1981

== Career statistics ==
No.	Date	Venue	Opponent	Score	Result	Competition
1.	10 September 1984	Yuexiushan Stadium, Guangzhou, China	Afghanistan	3–0	8–0	1984 AFC Asian Cup qualification
2.	10 September 1984	Yuexiushan Stadium, Guangzhou, China	Afghanistan	4–0	8–0	1984 AFC Asian Cup qualification
3.	10 September 1984	Yuexiushan Stadium, Guangzhou, China	Afghanistan	7–0	8–0	1984 AFC Asian Cup qualification
4.	1 December 1984	National Stadium, Kallang, Singapore	Syria	1–0	1–1	1984 AFC Asian Cup
