= Ali Zaid =

Qatari footballer (born 1961)

Personal information
- Date of birth: January 20, 1961 (age 65)
- Place of birth: Qatar
- Height: 1.73 m (5 ft 8 in)
- Positions: Forward; midfielder

Senior career*
Years	Team	Apps	(Gls)
- Al-Arabi

International career
1981	Qatar U20	3	(0)
1982–1986	Qatar		(1+)
- * Club domestic league appearances and goals

Ali Mohamed Zaid Al-Sadah (Arabic: علي محمد زيد السادة) is a Qatari football midfielder who played for Qatar at the 1984 Summer Olympics and the 1984 AFC Asian Cup finals.

== Club career ==
Ali played for Al-Arabi in the 1970s–1980s, Winning several Qatari League and Emir Cup titles.

== International career ==
Ali first played for the Qatar U23 team for the 1981 FIFA World Youth Championship, where Ali helped the team reach runner-up in the tournament.

Due to his performance in the youth tournament, He was selected for the senior team for the 1982 Gulf Cup, He then played an integral part in the 1984 Summer Olympics Qualifiers and also participated in the main event. Ali also played in the 1986 Gulf Cup, He appeared in Qatar's four 1984 AFC Asian Cup group stage matches, and notably scored a goal to salavge a draw with Saudi Arabia.

== Career statistics ==
No.	Date	Venue	Opponent	Score	Result	Competition
1.	8 December 1984	National Stadium, Kallang, Singapore	Saudi Arabia	1–0	1–1	1984 AFC Asian Cup
