= Football at the 1984 Summer Olympics – Men's Asian Qualifiers =

Football at the Olympics qualification

The Pre-Olympic tournaments of the Asian Qualifiers for the 1984 Summer Olympic were held from 12 August 1983 to 29 April 1984. Iraq, Saudi Arabia and Qatar qualified.

== First round ==
North Korea was banned from international competitions for two years by the AFC and FIFA for attacking a referee after the 1982 Asian Games football semi-final match against Kuwait in New Delhi, India.

=== Group 1 ===
Team	Pld	W	D	L	GF	GA	GD	Pts
Kuwait	6	3	2	1	11	6	+5	8
Qatar	6	2	4	0	6	4	+2	8
Syria	6	3	1	2	9	8	+1	7
Jordan	6	0	1	5	3	11	−8	1

12 August 1983

Syria	3–2	Jordan

Damascus
26 August 1983

Jordan	0–1	Syria

Amman
8 September 1983

Qatar	2–1	Jordan
Muftah 45', 83'		Salama 4'

Doha
15 September 1983

Kuwait	3–0	Jordan

Kuwait City
29 September 1983

Kuwait	2–2	Qatar
Yussef Al-Suwayed 7'; Khalid Al-Shabib 87'		Ibrahim Khalfan 44'; Khalid Salman 52'

Kuwait City
14 October 1983

Syria	1–3	Kuwait

Damascus
14 October 1983

Jordan	0–0	Qatar

Amman
21 October 1983

Jordan	0–2	Kuwait

Amman
21 October 1983

Syria	1–1	Qatar
Hassan		Muftah 70' (pen.)

Damascus
28 October 1983

Qatar	0–0	Kuwait

Doha
4 November 1983

Kuwait	1–3	Syria

Kuwait City
11 November 1983

Qatar	1–0	Syria
Muftah 58'

Doha

=== Group 2 ===
Team	Pld	W	D	L	GF	GA	GD	Pts
Iraq	4	1	3	0	4	3	+1	5
Bahrain	4	1	2	1	3	3	0	4
United Arab Emirates	4	0	3	1	3	4	−1	3

9 September 1983

Iraq	0–0	Bahrain

Al-Shaab Stadium, Baghdad
16 September 1983

Iraq	0–0	United Arab Emirates

Al-Shaab Stadium, Baghdad
30 September 1983

Bahrain	0–0	United Arab Emirates

Manama
7 October 1983

Bahrain	1–2	Iraq
Goal		Radhi; Saddam

Manama
10 October 1983

United Arab Emirates	2–2	Iraq
Goal		Shihab; Saeed

Sharjah
14 October 1983

United Arab Emirates	1–2	Bahrain

Abu Dhabi

=== Group 3 ===
Team	Pld	W	D	L	GF	GA	GD	Pts
Saudi Arabia	8	6	1	1	22	5	+17	13
Malaysia	8	5	2	1	14	7	+7	12
India	8	3	1	4	11	14	−3	7
Singapore	8	2	1	5	4	14	−10	5
Indonesia	8	0	3	5	3	14	−11	3

Note: Saudi Arabia played home and away matches; the other four countries played tournaments in Singapore and Kuala Lumpur.

1 October 1983

India	1–2	Saudi Arabia

New Delhi
6 October 1983

Indonesia	1–1	Saudi Arabia

Jakarta
10 October 1983

Malaysia	3–0	Saudi Arabia

Kuala Lumpur
14 October 1983

Singapore	0–3	Saudi Arabia

Singapore
16 October 1983

Malaysia	1–1	Indonesia

Singapore
17 October 1983

India	1–2	Singapore

Singapore
19 October 1983

India	4–0	Indonesia

Singapore
20 October 1983

Malaysia	2–0	Singapore

Singapore
22 October 1983

Malaysia	3–3	India

Singapore
23 October 1983

Singapore	1–0	Indonesia

Singapore
25 October 1983

India	0–2	Malaysia

Kuala Lumpur
26 October 1983

Indonesia	1–1	Singapore

Kuala Lumpur
28 October 1983

Indonesia	0–2	Malaysia

Kuala Lumpur
29 October 1983

Singapore	0–1	India

Kuala Lumpur
31 October 1983

Indonesia	0–1	India

Kuala Lumpur
1 November 1983

Singapore	0–1	Malaysia

Kuala Lumpur
6 November 1983

Saudi Arabia	5–0	India

Riyadh
11 November 1983

Saudi Arabia	2–0	Malaysia

Riyadh
17 November 1983

Saudi Arabia	5–0	Singapore

Riyadh
23 November 1983

Saudi Arabia	3–0	Indonesia

Riyadh

=== Group 4 ===
Team	Pld	W	D	L	GF	GA	GD	Pts
Thailand	6	4	1	1	7	3	+4	9
South Korea	6	3	2	1	12	5	+7	8
China	6	2	3	1	10	5	+5	7
Hong Kong	6	0	0	6	1	17	−16	0

1 November 1983

Thailand	2–1	South Korea
Vorawan Chitavanich 51'; Piyapong Piew-On 71'		Shin Yeon-Ho 41'

Bangkok
1 November 1983

China	4–0	Hong Kong
Zuo Shusheng 25', 48'; Gu Guangming 26'; Liu Haiguang 87'

Bangkok
3 November 1983

Hong Kong	0–3	Thailand
		Hongkajohn Chalor 78'; Sangnapol Chalermvud 82'; Boonnum Sukswat 84'

Bangkok
3 November 1983

South Korea	3–3	China
Kim Jong-Keon 33', 49'; Kim Jong-Boo 35'		Jia Xiuquan 51'; Liu Haiguang 78', 83'

Bangkok
5 November 1983

Thailand	0–0	China

Bangkok
5 November 1983

South Korea	4–0	Hong Kong
Kim Jong-Boo 58', 72', 85'; Shin Yeon-Ho 68'

Bangkok
8 November 1983

Thailand	1–0	Hong Kong

Bangkok
8 November 1983

China	0–0	South Korea

Bangkok
10 November 1983

China	0–1	Thailand
		Piyapong Piew-On 65'

Bangkok
10 November 1983

Hong Kong	0–2	South Korea
		Shin Yeon-Ho 36'; Kim Jong-Boo 60'

Bangkok
12 November 1983

South Korea	2–0	Thailand
Shin Yeon-Ho 44', 83'

Bangkok
12 November 1983

Hong Kong	1–3	China
Goal		Jia Xiuquan 35'; Li Huayun 61'; Li Haiguang 63'

Bangkok

=== Group 5 ===
Team 1	Agg.	Team 2	1st leg	2nd leg
Japan	17–1	Philippines	7–0	10–1
Chinese Taipei	3–3 (4–2 p)	Papua New Guinea	3–3	0–0 (a.e.t.)

==== Round 1 ====
4 September 1983

Japan	7–0	Philippines
Hara 23'; Kimura 27', 76'; Kato 37'; Yokoyama 41'; Tanaka 48', 78'

Tokyo
7 September 1983

Philippines	1–10	Japan
Alaneta 32'		3' (o.g.); Maeda 10'; Kimura 28', 35', 77', 82', 89'; Hara 29'; Yokoyama 46'; Kaneda 73'

Tokyo

Japan advanced to Round 2

21 August 1983

Chinese Taipei	3–3	Papua New Guinea
Wu Shui-chi 30'; Tu Teng-chuan 50'; Wang Tun-cheng 71'		Sani 5', 43', 60'

Taipei
23 September 1983

Papua New Guinea	0–0	Chinese Taipei
Penalties
	2–4

Taipei

Chinese Taipei advanced to Round 2

==== Round 2 ====
Team	Pld	W	D	L	GF	GA	GD	Pts
New Zealand	4	3	1	0	7	2	+5	7
Japan	4	1	1	2	4	5	−1	3
Chinese Taipei	4	0	2	2	2	6	−4	2

15 September 1983

Japan	2–0	Chinese Taipei
Hiromi Hara 43'; Kazushi Kimura 80'

Tokyo
20 September 1983

Chinese Taipei	1–1	Japan
Du Denggen 35'		Hideki Maeda 38'

Taipei
25 September 1983

New Zealand	3–1	Japan
Steve Sumner 53', 90'; Alan Boath 75'		Hiromi Hara 20'

Auckland
1 October 1983

New Zealand	2–0	Chinese Taipei
Alan Boath 8'; Grant Turner 19'

Auckland
7 October 1983

Japan	0–1	New Zealand
		Steve Sumner 47'

Tokyo
11 October 1983

Chinese Taipei	1–1	New Zealand
Lee Tsung-Chih 37'		Allan Boath 2'

Taipei

== Second round ==
All games in this round were played in National Stadium, Singapore. All times in Singapore Standard Time (SST).

=== Group 1 ===
Team	Pld	W	D	L	GF	GA	GD	Pts
Saudi Arabia	4	3	1	0	13	7	+6	7
South Korea	4	2	1	1	7	5	+2	5
Kuwait	4	2	1	1	5	4	+1	5
Bahrain	4	1	1	2	2	4	−2	3
New Zealand	4	0	0	4	1	8	−7	0

14 April 1984
18:30

Kuwait	2-0	Bahrain
Fathi 53'; Yussef 80'

National Stadium, Singapore
Attendance: 10,000
Referee: C. Bambridge (AUS)
15 April 1984
20:30

Saudi Arabia	3-1	New Zealand
Majed 11' 60'; Mohaisen 25'		Herbert 59'

National Stadium, Singapore
17 April 1984
18:30

South Korea	0-0	Kuwait

National Stadium, Singapore
Referee: Zhang Daqiao (CHN)
17 April 1984
20:30

Saudi Arabia	1–1	Bahrain
Mohaisen 66'		Khalil 77'

National Stadium, Singapore
Referee: Lee Kok Leong (SIN)
19 April 1984
18:30

Kuwait	2–0	New Zealand
Abdulla 30'; Nassir 36'

National Stadium, Singapore
Referee: Thomson Chan (HKG)
19 April 1984
20:30

South Korea	1-0	Bahrain
Choi 43'

National Stadium, Singapore
Attendance: 15,000
Referee: Ahmad Bash (JOR)
22 April 1984
18:30

Saudi Arabia	4-1	Kuwait
Mohaisen 34' 52'; Majed 86' 89'		Abdulla 60'

National Stadium, Singapore
Referee: C. Bambridge (AUS)
22 April 1984
20:30

South Korea	2–0	New Zealand
Chung Y.H. 66'; Choi 71'

National Stadium, Singapore
24 April 1984
18:30

Bahrain	1–0	New Zealand
Khalil 42'

National Stadium, Singapore
Attendance: 6,000
Referee: Ahmad Bash (JOR)
24 April 1984
20:30

Saudi Arabia	5-4	South Korea
Shaye 40'; Mohaisen 47'; Majed 58' (pen.) 66'; Saleh 82'		Chung J.S. 15'; Chung H.W. 18'; Hussein 49' (o.g.); Lee 75'

National Stadium, Singapore
Attendance: 20,000
Referee: H. Sudarso (INA)

Saudi Arabia won the group and qualified for the 1984 Summer Olympics football tournament.

=== Group 2 ===
Team	Pld	W	D	L	GF	GA	GD	Pts
Qatar	4	4	0	0	7	1	+6	8
Iraq	4	3	0	1	6	4	+2	6
Thailand	4	1	1	2	6	5	+1	3
Malaysia	4	1	1	2	2	5	−3	3
Japan	4	0	0	4	5	11	−6	0

15 April 1984
18:30

Thailand	5–2	Japan
Piyapong 16' 50' 71' (pen.); Chalor 25'; Chalermvud 49'		Hashiratani 70'; Kimura 79'

National Stadium, Singapore
Attendance: 15,000
16 April 1984
19:30

Qatar	2–0	Malaysia
Ibrahim Khalfan 52' (pen.); Khalid Salman 55'

National Stadium, Singapore
Attendance: 20,000
Referee: Thomson Chan (HKG)
18 April 1984

Iraq	2–1	Thailand
Munir 7'; Jassim 78'		Vorawan 36'

National Stadium, Singapore
Attendance: 25,000
Referee: H. Sudarso (INA)
18 April 1984

Malaysia	2–1	Japan
Yunus 31'; Zainal 54'		Hara 85'

National Stadium, Singapore
Referee: M. Nazari (IRN)
21 April 1984

Qatar	1–0	Thailand
Ibrahim Khalfan 19'

National Stadium, Singapore
Referee: Lee Kok Leong (SIN)
21 April 1984

Iraq	2–1	Japan
Munir 2'; Dirjal 45'		Hara 34'

National Stadium, Singapore
Attendance: 15,000
Referee: N. Chandra (SIN)
23 April 1984

Qatar	2–0	Iraq
Ibrahim Khalfan 14' (pen.); Mansour Muftah 77'

National Stadium, Singapore
Attendance: 30,000
Referee: Zhang Daqiao (CHN)
23 April 1984

Thailand	0–0	Malaysia

National Stadium, Singapore
Referee: M. Nazari (IRN)
26 April 1984

Qatar	2–1	Japan
Ibrahim Khalfan 21'; Khalid Salman 64'		Hara 50'

National Stadium, Singapore
Referee: Tulu Gurkan (PHI)
26 April 1984

Iraq	2–0	Malaysia
Allawi 37'; Saeed 62'

National Stadium, Singapore
Attendance: 18,000
Referee: C. Bambridge (AUS)

Qatar won the group and qualified for the 1984 Summer Olympics football tournament.

=== Playoff match ===
29 April 1984

Iraq	1–0	South Korea
Dirjal 43'

National Stadium, Singapore
Attendance: 45,000
Referee: C. Bambridge (AUS)

Iraq won the play-off and qualified for the 1984 Summer Olympics football tournament.
