= Adel Khamis =

Qatari footballer (born 1965)

Personal information
- Full name: Adel Khamis Jumaa Mubarak Al-Noubi
- Date of birth: November 11, 1965 (age 60)
- Place of birth: Doha, Qatar
- Positions: Defensive midfielder; defender

Youth career
- 1979–1983: Al Ittihad

Senior career*
Years	Team	Apps	(Gls)
1983–1997	Al Ittihad		
1997–1998	Qadsia		
1998–2002	Al Ittihad		

International career
1984–2000	Qatar	80+	
- * Club domestic league appearances and goals

Adel Khamis (Arabic: عادل خميس, born 1965) is a Qatari former footballer who played as a Defensive midfielder for Al-Gharafa and the Qatar national team, He was the first Qatari footballer to play abroad for Qadsia SC.

== Club career ==
Khamis started his career with the youth team of Al Gharafa in 1979. He eventually progressed to the senior squad in 1983, when the team was in the Qatari Second Division.

Adel helped the team win the Qatari League several times alongside trophies such as the Emir Cup. In the 1990–91 Qatari League season, He was tied with his teammate Mahmoud Soufi for the top-goalscorer award with both players scoring 8 goals.

Adel became the first Qatari footballer to play abroad, appearing for Kuwait's Qadsia from 1997 to 1998. He retired from international football in 2000 following a farewell match against Sudan.

== International career ==
Adel made his debut for the Qatar national team in 1984 under coach Evaristo de Macedo at the age of 18. He established himself as a regular starter during the 1986 Gulf Cup, where he scored three goals, and also featured in the 1986 Asian Games. His international career reached its peak in 1992, when he played a key role in helping Qatar win the 1992 Gulf Cup on home soil.

He played in various competitions for Qatar such as the World Cup qualifiers, Asian Games, FIFA Arab Cup, retiring in the 1998 Gulf Cup.

== Honours ==
Qatari League

- Winners (3): 1991–92, 1997–98, 2001–02
- Qatari Second Division
  - Winners (2): 1983–84, 1986–87
- Emir of Qatar Cup
  - Winners (8): 1994–95, 1995–96, 1996–97, 1997–98, 2001–02
