= 7th Arabian Gulf Cup =

International football tournament in 1984

1984 Arabian Gulf Cup
دورة كأس الخليج العربي السادسة (in Arabic)

Tournament details
- Host country: Oman
- Dates: 9 March – 28 April
- Teams: 7
- Venue: 1 (in 1 host city)

Final positions
- Champions: Iraq (2nd title)
- Runners-up: Qatar

Tournament statistics
- Matches played: 15
- Goals scored: 46 (3.07 per match)
- Top scorer: (Iraq) Hussein Saeed (7 goals)
- Best player(s): (Iraq) Hussein Saeed (Oman) Ghulam Khamis

The 7th Arabian Gulf Cup (Arabic: كأس الخليج العربي) took place in Muscat, the capital of Oman, from 9 to 28 March 1984. Iraq won the tournament against Qatar in a match that was decided on penalties. Both Iraq and Qatar had finished with exactly the same points in the round-robin tournament earlier. Iraq's Hussein Saeed was the top scorer, with seven goals, and was also selected, along with Oman's Ghulam Khamis, as the best player of the tournament.

== Matches ==
Team	Pts	Pld	W	D	L	GF	GA	GD
Iraq	9	6	4	1	1	11	4	+7
Qatar	9	6	4	1	1	9	5	+4
Saudi Arabia	7	6	3	1	2	9	8	+1
United Arab Emirates	7	6	2	3	1	5	4	+1
Bahrain	4	6	1	2	3	3	6	−3
Kuwait	4	6	1	2	3	4	8	−4
Oman	2	6	0	2	4	3	9	−6

March 9, 1984

Oman	0−1	Bahrain
		Shuwair 74'

Royal Oman Police Stadium, Mascat

March 10, 1984

United Arab Emirates	2−0	Kuwait
Al-Talyani 8'; S. Abdullah 49'

Royal Oman Police Stadium, Mascat

March 10, 1984

Qatar	2−1	Saudi Arabia
Khalfan 21'; Zaid 29'		Abdullah 33'

Royal Oman Police Stadium, Mascat

March 11, 1984

Iraq	2−1	Oman
Saeed 25' 29'		Hamdan 45'

Royal Oman Police Stadium, Mascat

March 12, 1984

Kuwait	1−0	Bahrain
Sultan 35'

Royal Oman Police Stadium, Mascat

March 12, 1984

United Arab Emirates	1−0	Qatar
Al-Talyani 4'

Royal Oman Police Stadium, Mascat

March 15, 1984

Iraq	0 − 0	United Arab Emirates

Royal Oman Police Stadium, Mascat

March 15, 1984

Saudi Arabia	3 − 1	Oman
Al-Musaibeah 7'; Bakhshwain 17'; Khalifah 79'		Amaan 65'

Royal Oman Police Stadium, Mascat

March 16, 1984

Qatar	2 − 1	Kuwait
Muftah 15'; Eid 49'		Shabib 45'

Royal Oman Police Stadium, Mascat

March 17, 1984

Iraq	4 − 0	Saudi Arabia
Shakir 25'; Saeed 57' 70' 84'

Royal Oman Police Stadium, Mascat

March 18, 1984

Qatar	2 − 0	Oman
Zaid 62'; Muftah 68'

Royal Oman Police Stadium, Mascat

March 18, 1984

United Arab Emirates	1 − 1	Bahrain
Obaid 50'		Shuwair 35'

Royal Oman Police Stadium, Mascat

March 20, 1984

Saudi Arabia	1 − 1	Kuwait
Al-Nafeasah 4'		Abdunnabi 42'

Royal Oman Police Stadium, Mascat

March 20, 1984

Iraq	1 − 0	Bahrain
Hashim 66'

Royal Oman Police Stadium, Mascat

March 21, 1984

United Arab Emirates	1 − 1	Oman
F. Khamees 55'		Khamis 7'

Royal Oman Police Stadium, Mascat

March 22, 1984

Qatar	1 − 1	Bahrain
Zaid 60'		Farhan 10'

Royal Oman Police Stadium, Mascat

March 22, 1984

Iraq	3 − 1	Kuwait
Saeed 47' 75'; Allawi 80'		Fulaiteh 59'

Royal Oman Police Stadium, Mascat

March 23, 1984

Saudi Arabia	2 − 0	United Arab Emirates
Khalifah 26'; Jassem 86'

Royal Oman Police Stadium, Mascat

March 25, 1984

Qatar	2 − 1	Iraq
Muftah 26'; Gorgis 41' (o.g.)		Radhi 55'

Royal Oman Police Stadium, Mascat

March 25, 1984

Kuwait	0 − 0	Oman

Royal Oman Police Stadium, Mascat

March 26, 1984

Saudi Arabia	2 − 0	Bahrain
Al-Meagil 66' 69'

Royal Oman Police Stadium, Mascat

Play-Off

March 28, 1984

Iraq	1–1 (a.e.t.)	Qatar
Dirjal 102'		Muftah 109'
Penalties
	3–2

Royal Oman Police Stadium, Mascat

== Result ==
7th Arabian Gulf Cup winners

Iraq
Second title
