= Juma Salem Johar =

Qatari footballer (born 1970)

Personal information
- Date of birth: 20 August 1970 (age 56)

Senior career*
Years	Team	Apps	(Gls)
- Al-Wakrah
- Qatar SC

International career
- Qatar
- * Club domestic league appearances and goals

Juma Salem Johar (born 20 August 1970) is a Qatari footballer. He competed in the men's tournament at the 1992 Summer Olympics.
