= Khamis Eid =

Bahraini footballer

Personal information
- Full name: Khamis Eid Rafee Thani
- Date of birth: 20 October 1966 (age 60)
- Place of birth: Bahrain
- Position: Defender

Senior career*
Years	Team	Apps	(Gls)
1983–1995	Riffa SC		
1995–1999	Al-Qadsiah		
1999–2000	Al-Shamal		
2000–2002	Al-Khaleej		
2001	→ Qatar SC		

International career
1985–2000	Bahrain	+100	
- * Club domestic league appearances and goals

Khamis Eid Rafee Thani (born 20 October 1966) is a Bahraini football defender who played for Bahrain in the Asian Cup.
