= Ghulam Khamis =

Omani footballer

Personal information
- Date of birth: 1959
- Place of birth: Oman
- Date of death: 17 November 2008 (aged 49)
- Position: Midfielder

Youth career
- Al Ahli

Senior career*
Years	Team	Apps	(Gls)
1976–1988	Al Ahli		

International career
1978–1988	Oman		
- * Club domestic league appearances and goals

Ghulam Khamis (Arabic: غلام خميس) was an Omani footballer who played as a midfielder. Dubbed as Maradona of Oman, he is regarded as one of Oman's finest footballers.

== Early life ==
Khamis was born in 1959.

== Club career ==
Khamis started playing football in Hassan bin Thabit School in Oman. He started his youth career with Oman club Al Ahli (later renamed Ahli Sidab Club), and became part of the senior team in 1976. He went on to win the Sultan Qaboos Cup four times, and the Omani League in 1982. After his performance with the Oman national team, Khamis reportedly received an offer from Al-Arabi SC of Qatar in 1988, but his club refused to release him.

In the late 1980s, he suffered an injury that sidelined him for an extended period, ultimately leading to his decision to retire.

== International career ==
Khamis was first called by the Oman national team in 1978, and subsequently participated in five editions of the Arabian Gulf Cup. He was declared best player of the tournament in the 7th Arabian Gulf Cup in 1984. He last played with the national team at the 9th Arabian Gulf Cup in 1988, where Oman recorded its first ever win in the tournament.

== Death ==
Khamis died away on board of the plane taking him to Bangkok in Thailand on 17 November 2008, for his treatment for diabetes which he sustained since 2004, which had led to the amputation of two of his toes of his left foot, and a kidney failure. His death occurred two months before Oman went to win their first Gulf Cup title ever in 2009. He left behind four daughters and a son.

== Honours ==
=== Al Ahli ===
- Omani League: 1981–82
- Sultan Qaboos Cup: 1972, 1982, 1983, 1984, 1988
