= 8th Arabian Gulf Cup =

International football tournament in 1986

Tournament details
- Host country: Bahrain
- Dates: 19 March – 7 April
- Venue: 1 (in 1 host city)

Final positions
- Champions: Kuwait (6th title)

Tournament statistics
- Matches played: 21
- Goals scored: 53 (2.52 per match)
- Top scorer: (United Arab Emirates) Fahad Khamees (6 goals)
- Best player: (Kuwait) Muayad Al-Haddad
- Best goalkeeper: (Bahrain) Mohamed Saleh Al-Bushait

The 8th Arabian Gulf Cup (Arabic: كأس الخليج العربي) was held in Manama, Bahrain in March 1986.

The tournament was won by Kuwait, claiming their 6th title.

Iraq participated with the B team.

== Tournament ==
The teams played a single round-robin style competition. The team achieving first place in the overall standings was the tournament winner.

Team	Pld	W	D	L	GF	GA	GD	Pts
Kuwait	6	5	1	0	11	4	+7	11
United Arab Emirates	6	3	1	2	10	7	+3	7
Saudi Arabia	6	3	0	3	9	9	0	6
Qatar	6	2	2	2	7	8	–1	6
Bahrain	6	1	4	1	4	5	–1	6
Iraq	6	1	3	2	8	9	–1	5
Oman	6	0	1	5	4	11	–7	1

22 March 1986

Bahrain	0–0	Iraq

Bahrain National Stadium, Manama

23 March 1986

Kuwait	3–1	Saudi Arabia
Al-Dakhil 50' Hussein 70' Al-Suwayed 74'		Abdullah 90'

Bahrain National Stadium, Manama

23 March 1986

Qatar	2–1	Oman
Issa Ahmed 24' Adel Khamis 53'		Hilal Humeid 54'

Bahrain National Stadium, Manama

24 March 1986

United Arab Emirates	2–2	Iraq
F. Khamees 12'; Al Talyani 75'		Saddam 26'; Hussein 62'

Bahrain National Stadium, Manama

25 March 1986

Bahrain	2–1	Saudi Arabia
Mohammed 5' Eid 89'		Abdullah 88'

Bahrain National Stadium, Manama

25 March 1986

Kuwait	2–0	Oman
Al-Hasawi 85'; Al-Dakhil 90+1'

Bahrain National Stadium, Manama

27 March 1986

Iraq	1–1	Qatar
Jafar 61'		Khamis 83'

Bahrain National Stadium, Manama

28 March 1986

Saudi Arabia	3–1	Oman
Abdullah 42' (pen.), 88'; Al-Juman 59'		Khamis 83'

Bahrain National Stadium, Manama

28 March 1986

Kuwait	1–0	United Arab Emirates
Al-Haddad 73'

Bahrain National Stadium, Manama

29 March 1986

Qatar	0–0	Bahrain

Bahrain National Stadium, Manama

30 March 1986

United Arab Emirates	1–0	Oman
F. Khamees 29'

Bahrain National Stadium, Manama

30 March 1986

Saudi Arabia	2–1	Iraq
Al-Jawad 26'; Al-Bishi 63'		Saddam 75'

Bahrain National Stadium, Manama

1 April 1986

Kuwait	2–1	Qatar
Al-Dakhil 27', 63'		Khamis 83'

Bahrain National Stadium, Manama

2 April 1986

United Arab Emirates	2–0	Saudi Arabia
F. Khamees 9'; Al-Talyani 25'

Bahrain National Stadium, Manama

2 April 1986

Bahrain	0–0	Oman

Bahrain National Stadium, Manama

3 April 1986

Kuwait	2–1	Iraq
Saad 3'; Al-Suwayes 48'		Jassim 84'

Bahrain National Stadium, Manama

5 April 1986

United Arab Emirates	3–1	Bahrain
F. Khamees 43', 53'; N. Khamees 56'		Faraj 55'

Bahrain National Stadium, Manama

5 April 1986

Saudi Arabia	2–0	Qatar
Al-Jam'an 35' Al-Nafisah 53'

Bahrain National Stadium, Manama

6 April 1986

Iraq	3–2	Oman
Hameed 27', 58', 89'		Hilal Humeid Said Faraj

Bahrain National Stadium, Manama

7 April 1986

Kuwait	1–1	Bahrain
Al-Dakhil 13'		Al-Amiri 62'

Bahrain National Stadium, Manama

7 April 1986

Qatar	3–2	United Arab Emirates
Khamis 64'; Salman 81', 87'		F. Khamees 19'; Al Talyani 55'

Bahrain National Stadium, Manama

== Result ==
8th Arabian Gulf Cup winners

Kuwait
Sixth title
