= Issa Al-Mohammadi =

Qatari footballer (born 1963)

Issa Ahmed
Personal information
- Full name: Issa Ahmed Mohammed Yousef Al Mohammadi
- Date of birth: 19 December 1963 (age 62)
- Place of birth: Doha, Qatar
- Height: 5 ft 9 in (1.75 m)
- Position: Midfielder

Senior career*
Years	Team	Apps	(Gls)
1980–1990	Al Ahli		(50)

International career
1981	Qatar U20	3	(0)
1983–1992	Qatar	81	(15)
- * Club domestic league appearances and goals

Issa Ahmed Al-Mohammadi is a Qatari former footballer who played as a Midfielder who played for Qatar.

== Club career ==
Issa started playing for Al Ahli in his junior years being promoted step by step, Eventually making his debut for the senior squad. He scored his first goal against Al-Wakrah in a league match in the 1980/1981 season.

== Honours ==
=== Club ===
- Al-Ahli
- Emir of Qatar Cup
  - Winners : 1981, 1987,
  - Runners-up : 1984, 1985,

=== International ===
- Youth World Cup runner-up: 1981
