= Yussef Al-Suwayed =

Kuwaiti footballer

Personal information
- Full name: Yousef Faraj Al-Suwayed
- Date of birth: 20 September 1958 (age 68)
- Place of birth: Kuwait
- Height: 1.70 m (5 ft 7 in)
- Position: Midfielder

Senior career*
Years	Team	Apps	(Gls)
1975–1992	Kazma SC	198	(137)

International career
1979–1990	Kuwait	61	(21)
- * Club domestic league appearances and goals

Yussef Faraj Al-Suwayed (born 20 September 1958) is a Kuwaiti former football who played as a midfielder. He represented Kuwait in the 1982 FIFA World Cup and earned 61 caps for his country.

He also played for Kazma Sporting Club.
