= Saudi Arabia national football team results (1957–1979) =

This is a list of the Saudi Arabia national football team results from 1957 to 1979.

== Results ==
Win Draw Loss

=== 1957 ===
| 18 October 1957 Pan Arab Games GS | Saudi Arabia | 1–1 | Lebanon | Beirut, Lebanon |
| --:-- UTC+3 | Kayyal 30' | | Altounian 22' | Stadium: Camille Chamoun Stadium |

| 20 October 1957 Pan Arab Games GS | Jordan | 1–0 | Saudi Arabia | Beirut, Lebanon |
| --:-- UTC+3 | Adas 65' | | | Stadium: Camille Chamoun Stadium |

| 22 October 1957 Pan Arab Games GS | Saudi Arabia | 3–1 | Syria | Beirut, Lebanon |
| --:-- UTC+3 | Al-Yafei 14', 55'; Janja 75' | | Mahmoud 34' | Stadium: Camille Chamoun Stadium |

=== 1961 ===
| 3 September 1961 Pan Arab Games | United Arab Republic | 13–0 | Saudi Arabia | Casablanca, Morocco |
| --:-- UTC+3 | Abdel Fattah 4', 22', 49', 69'; El-Shazly 9', 27', 61'; Ismail 17', 32', 56'; Shehta 45'; Karam 75'; El-Fanagily 88' | | | Stadium: Stade Mohammed V |

| 4 September 1961 Pan Arab Games | Lebanon | 7–1 | Saudi Arabia | Casablanca, Morocco |
| --:-- UTC+3 | George; Abou Murad; Al Sharqi | Report | Al-Wasla 82' | Stadium: Stade Mohammed V |

| 6 September 1961 Pan Arab Games | Morocco | 13–1 | Saudi Arabia | Casablanca, Morocco |
| --:-- UTC+3 | Zidane 16', 23', 50', 64', 69', 85'; Lamari 27', 33', 37'; Bahij 41', 67'; Rhiad 44'; Khattabi 62' | | Bakr 78' | Stadium: Stade Mohammed V |

| 8 September 1961 Pan Arab Games | Libya | 5–1 | Saudi Arabia | Casablanca, Morocco |
| --:-- UTC+3 | Al-Biski ? | | | Stadium: Stade Mohammed V |

| 10 September 1961 Pan Arab Games | Saudi Arabia | 1–0 | Kuwait | Casablanca, Morocco |
| --:-- UTC+3 | | | | Stadium: Stade Mohammed V |

=== 1963 ===
| 18 November 1st GANEFO | United Arab Republic | 7–0 | Saudi Arabia | Indonesia |
| --:-- |

=== 1967 ===
| 18 March 1967 Friendly | Pakistan | 3–1 | Saudi Arabia | Lyallpur, Pakistan |
| | Moosa 10', 35' (?) | Report | Mubark 65' | Stadium: Lyallpur Stadium; Referee: Sheikh Shaheb Ali (Pakistan) |

| 21 March 1967 Friendly | Pakistan | 2–4 | Saudi Arabia | Sukkur, Pakistan |
| | Bakhsh; Abdullah | Report | Ghorab; Mubark; Kadour | Stadium: Sukkur Municipal Stadium; Referee: Rifat Ullah Khan (Pakistan) |

| 25 March 1967 Friendly | Pakistan | 2–2 | Saudi Arabia | Hyderabad, Pakistan |
| | Pratap (?); Ghafoor 8' | Report | Ghorab 37' (?) | Stadium: Niaz Stadium; Referee: Fazal Akbar (Pakistan) |

| 29 March 1967 Friendly | Pakistan | 1–1 | Saudi Arabia | Karachi, Pakistan |
| | Qadir 23' | Report | Ghorab 13' | Stadium: KMC Stadium; Referee: Jan Mohammad (Pakistan) |

| 10 December Friendly | Saudi Arabia | 4–0 | Tunisia | Saudi Arabia |
| --:-- UTC+3 | Ghorab 26'; Marshad Al Otaibi 34'; Othman Bakhit 37' (pen.); Mubark Al Naseer 76' | Report |

=== 1969 ===
| 17 January Friendly | Saudi Arabia | 1–2 | Turkey | Saudi Arabia |
| --:-- UTC+3 | Mubarak Al Nasser 70' | | Karadoğan 21'; 42' M. Şen | Stadium: Al Sayegh Stadium, Riyadh; Referee: Abdullah Kaki |

=== 1970 ===
| 28 March 1st Gulf Cup | Kuwait | 3–1 | Saudi Arabia | Isa Town, Bahrain |
| 16:00 UTC+3 | Diksin 43'; Khalaf 67'; Al-Masoud 83' | Report | Al-Abdali 2' | Stadium: Isa Town Stadium; Referee: Abdeen Ibrahim (Sudan) |

| 30 March 1st Gulf Cup | Bahrain | 0–0 | Saudi Arabia | Isa Town, Bahrain |
| 16:00 UTC+3 | | Report | | Stadium: Isa Town Stadium; Referee: Sobhi Naseer (Egypt) |

| 2 April 1st Gulf Cup | Saudi Arabia | 1–1 | Qatar | Isa Town, Bahrain |
| 16:00 UTC+3 | Mousa 20' | Report | Ballan 45+1' | Stadium: Isa Town Stadium; Referee: Yousef Al-Suwaidan (Kuwait) |

=== 1972 ===
| 16 March 2nd Gulf Cup | Kuwait | 2–2 | Saudi Arabia | Riyadh, Saudi Arabia |
| --:-- UTC+3 | Yaqoub 15'; Al-Mula 30' | | Al-Mughnem 33'; Mousa 70' | Stadium: Youth Welfare Stadium in Al-Malaz, Riyadh; Referee: Mohamed Diab Al-Attar (Egypt) |

| 23 March 2nd Gulf Cup | Saudi Arabia | 4–0 | Qatar | Riyadh, Saudi Arabia |
| --:-- UTC+3 | Ghorab 2', 60'; Mousa 39', 73' (pen.) |

=== 1975 ===
| 21 November 1976 AFC Asian Cup qualification | Saudi Arabia | 2–0 | Afghanistan | Baghdad, Iraq |
| --:-- UTC+3 | Al-Mughnem 40'; Subhi 50' | | | Stadium: Al-Shaab Stadium |

| 23 November 1976 AFC Asian Cup qualification | Qatar | 1–0 | Saudi Arabia | Baghdad, Iraq |
| --:-- UTC+3 | ? 8' | | | Stadium: Al-Shaab Stadium |

| 25 November | Iraq | 1–1 | Saudi Arabia | Baghdad, Iraq |
| --:-- UTC+3 | Al-Mughnem 4' | | H. Ahmed 86' |

| 28 November | Afghanistan | 0–6 | Saudi Arabia | Baghdad, Iraq |
| --:-- UTC+3 | | | Al Mugnim 7', 41'; Bakhit 12', 33'; Sultan Naseab 25'; Abdeli 65' | Stadium: Al-Shaab Stadium, Baghdad |

| 30 November | Saudi Arabia | 2–1 | Qatar | Baghdad, Iraq |
| --:-- UTC+3 | Al-Mughnim 52'; Bakhit 59' | Report | Al-Sayegh 7' | Stadium: Al-Shaab Stadium |

| 2 December 1976 AFC Asian Cup qualification | Saudi Arabia | 1–2 | Iraq | Baghdad, Iraq |
| --:-- UTC+3 | Bakhit 54' | | Sobhi 13'; Hassan 42' | Stadium: Al-Shaab Stadium; Referee: Mohsen Zamani (Iran) |

| 21 December 1975 Palestine Cup | Saudi Arabia | 0–1 | South Yemen | Tunis, Tunisia |
| --:-- UTC+3 | | | Al-Mass 35' | Stadium: Stade El Menzah, Tunis |

| 23 December 1975 Palestine Cup | Egypt | 2–1 | Saudi Arabia | Tunis, Tunisia |
| --:-- UTC+3 | Abdeldayem 35'; Shehata 78' | | Jassim 40' | Stadium: Stade El Menzah, Tunis |

=== 1976 ===
| 9 January 1975 Friendship Cup | Saudi Arabia | 1–3 | Algeria | Riyadh, Saudi Arabia |
| --:-- UTC+3 | Sarukh 60' | | Safsafi 13'; Draoui 67', 83' | Stadium: Prince Faisal bin Fahd Stadium |

| 20 February Friendly | Saudi Arabia | 0–2 | Morocco | Riyadh, Saudi Arabia |
| --:-- UTC+3 |

| 5 September Friendly | Saudi Arabia | 0–0 | Iraq | Riyadh, Saudi Arabia |
| --:-- UTC+3 |

| 12 September Friendly | Saudi Arabia | 0–2 | Morocco | Riyadh, Saudi Arabia |
| --:-- UTC+3 |

| 30 September Friendly | Saudi Arabia | 0–1 | Tunisia | Dammam, Saudi Arabia |
| --:-- UTC+3 |

| 8 October 1976 Pan Arab Games | Saudi Arabia | 4–1 | Mauritania | Damascus, Syria |
| --:-- UTC+3 | Al-Turki 12'; Hamdan 34'; Bakheet 56'; Foudah 83' | | 62' | Stadium: Abbasiyyin Stadium |

| 10 October 1976 Pan Arab Games | Morocco | 0–0 | Saudi Arabia | Damascus, Syria |
| --:-- UTC+3 | | | | Stadium: Abbasiyyin Stadium |

| 12 October 1976 Pan Arab Games | Saudi Arabia | 3–1 | Palestine | Damascus, Syria |
| --:-- UTC+3 | | | | Stadium: Abbasiyyin Stadium |

| 16 October 1976 Pan Arab Games | South Yemen | 1–0 | Saudi Arabia | Damascus, Syria |
| --:-- UTC+3 | Saif 60' | | | Stadium: Abbasiyyin Stadium |

| 18 October 1976 Pan Arab Games | Jordan | 1–0 | Saudi Arabia | Damascus, Syria |
| --:-- UTC+3 | Saji 75' | | | Stadium: Abbasiyyin Stadium |

| 21 October 1976 Pan Arab Games | Syria | 0–2 | Saudi Arabia | Damascus, Syria |
| --:-- UTC+3 | | | Hamdan 5'; Khalifa 45' | Stadium: Abbasiyyin Stadium |

| 12 November 1978 WCQ | Saudi Arabia | 2–0 | Syria | Jeddah, Saudi Arabia |
| --:-- UTC+3 | Al Fahad 22'; Bo Saeed 54' | | | Referee: Dörflinger (Switzerland) |

| 26 November 1978 WCQ | Syria | 2–1 | Saudi Arabia | Damascus, Syria |
| --:-- UTC+3 | Al Katbi 36'; Khouri 82' | | Ghani 44' | Referee: Doğan Babacan (Turkey) |

=== 1977 ===
| 7 January 1978 WCQ | Saudi Arabia | 0–3 | Iran | Jeddah, Saudi Arabia |
| --:-- UTC+3 | | | Mazloumi 16', 78'; Roshan 62' | Referee: Erich Linemayr (Austria) |

| 22 April 1978 WCQ | Iran | 2–0 | Saudi Arabia | Shiraz, Iran |
| --:-- UTC+3 | Yousifi 10'; Shareefi 84' | | | Referee: Dörflinger (Switzerland) |

=== 1978 ===
| 3 May 1978 1978 Saudi Arabia Football Federation International Tournament | Saudi Arabia | 6–0 | Pakistan | Riyadh, Saudi Arabia |
| | Abdullah | Report |

| 6 May 1978 1978 Saudi Arabia Football Federation International Tournament | Saudi Arabia | 2–1 | Kenya | Riyadh, Saudi Arabia |
| | Abdullah | Report |

| 15 November Friendly | Cyprus | 2–2 | Saudi Arabia | Nicosia, Cyprus |
| --:-- UTC+3 |

| 10 December 1978 Asian Games | China | 1–0 | Saudi Arabia | Bangkok, Thailand |
| --:-- UTC+3 |

| 12 December 1978 Asian Games | Saudi Arabia | 2–2 | Qatar | Bangkok, Thailand |
| --:-- UTC+3 | Hussein (?); Al-Saghir 60' | Report | Muftah 67', 68' |

| 14 December 1978 Asian Games | Iraq | 1–1 | Saudi Arabia | Bangkok, Thailand |
| --:-- UTC+3 |

=== 1979 ===
| 24 March 1979 Gulf Cup | Saudi Arabia | 2–1 | United Arab Emirates | Baghdad, Iraq |
| --:-- UTC+3 | Naseeb 22'; Abdullah 71' | | Easa |

| 28 March 1979 Gulf Cup | Saudi Arabia | 4–0 | Oman | Baghdad, Iraq |
| --:-- UTC+3 | Jassem 34', 54'; Khalifa 69'; Abdullah 75' |

| 2 April 1979 Gulf Cup | Saudi Arabia | 1–1 | Bahrain | Baghdad, Iraq |
| --:-- UTC+3 | Jassem 53' | | Ghaith 41' |

| 4 April 1979 Gulf Cup | Saudi Arabia | 7–0 | Qatar | Baghdad, Iraq |
| --:-- UTC+3 | Abdullah 14', 15', 45', 48', 55'; Hamdan 32'; Abdoraboh 89' |

| 6 April 1979 Gulf Cup | Saudi Arabia | 0–0 | Kuwait | Baghdad, Iraq |
| --:-- UTC+3 |

| 8 April 1979 Gulf Cup | Iraq | 2–0 | Saudi Arabia | Baghdad, Iraq |
| --:-- UTC+3 |
