= Fouad Bushager =

Bahraini former footballer

Personal information
- Full name: Fouad Bushager
- Date of birth: Unknown
- Place of birth: Bahrain
- Date of death: 2005
- Position: Striker

Senior career*
Years	Team	Apps	(Gls)
- Al-Arabi
- Al-Riffa

International career
1970–1982	Bahrain	17+	(5+)
- * Club domestic league appearances and goals

Fouad Bushager, alternatively spelled as Fuad Bushager (Arabic: فؤاد بوشقر;) was a former association footballer, who played as a striker for the Bahrain national football team in the 1970s till the early 1980s. Bushager was known for his clinical shooting technique and is regarded as one of the best Bahraini players of his era.

== Club career ==
Bushager was a prominent striker in the Bahrain League, being the top goal-scorer of the league on several occasions. He played for Al-Arabi and Al-Riffa at domestic level.

== International career ==
In 1970, Bushager represented the Bahrain national football team at the 1970 Gulf Cup.

Later on in 1974, Bushager represented the national team at the 1974 Gulf Cup and the 1974 Asian Games, Bushager would score a hat-trick in Bahrain's opening match against Oman at the Gulf Cup. At the Asian Games, due to the absence of Hassan Zuleikh, Bahrain's attacking power cheapened, Bushager would score Bahrain's only goal throughout the tournament against Pakistan in a 1–5 loss. Bushager would later go on to feature in the 1978 World Cup Qualifiers, 1979 Gulf Cup, 1982 World Cup Qualifiers, and the 1982 Gulf Cup.

== Post-retirement ==
After retiring from professional football, Bushager would transition into the field of being a sports analyst.

== Death ==
Bushager passed away in 2005.
