= Mohammad S. Abdeli =

Saudi Arabian footballer (1946–2020)

Mohammed bin Saad al-Abdali
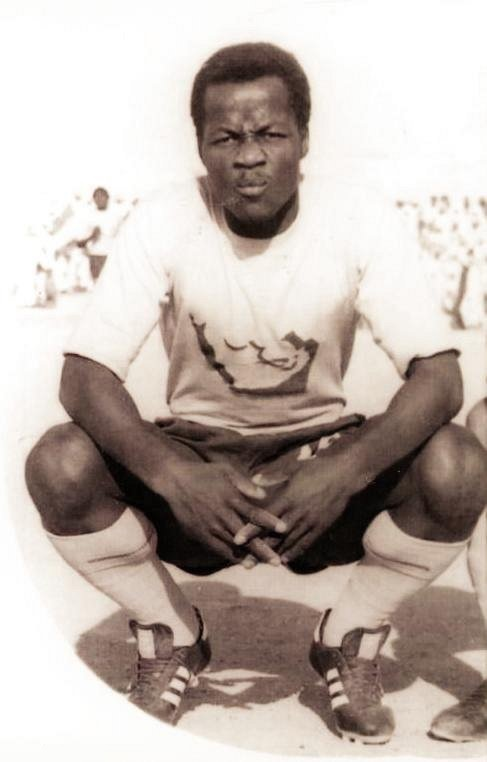
- Mohammed Al-Abdali in 1974

Personal information
- Full name: Mohammed Bin Saad Al-Abdali
- Date of birth: 1946
- Place of birth: Ta'if, Saudi Arabia
- Date of death: 7 February 2020 (aged 73–74)
- Place of death: Riyadh, Saudi Arabia

Senior career*
Years	Team	Apps	(Gls)
1967–1980	Al-Nassr		(73)

International career
1970–1977	Saudi Arabia	12	(2)
- * Club domestic league appearances and goals

Mohammed bin Saad al-Abdali (1946 – 7 February 2020) was a Saudi footballer who played striker. His career spanned around 15 years, during which he scored 57 goals across 53 friendly's matches, and 130 goals across 132 official matches with Al-Nassr. He is known as one of the best players to play for Al-Nassr, he was the top goal-scorer for the first Saudi League. He was born in Taif, Saudi Arabia.

== Early life ==
Al-Abdali was born in Taif, Saudi Arabia, He was fond of football from a young age,

Once an incident occurred where Al-Abdali was playing a match in the Central area of the Taif region with his friends, Abdali needed a player to fill in for the goalkeeper for the opposing team, so he brought his friend who played as their goalie. During the game he shot a powerful shot which hit his friend, which caused him to faint and then pass away the same day. Al-Abdali was then arrested but released.

This incident got the attention of Saudi newspapers who wrote about him, and this caught the eye of Al-Nassr, who signed him.

== Club career ==
Al-Abdali started playing for Al-Nassr in 1967. He became the first top goal-scorer of the Saudi League with 13 goals in the 1974–75 Saudi League, and also scored in the final game of the league.

== International career ==
Al-Abdali played for the Saudi national team in the 1970s. He made his debut at the 1970 Gulf Cup, where he scored a goal against Kuwait in a 1–3 loss. He couldn't participate in the 1972 Gulf Cup due to injury, however he played in the 1974 and 1976 editions.

== Death ==
Al-Abdali died on 7 February, 2020.

== Honours ==
=== Al-Nassr ===
- Crown Prince's Cup: 1972–73, 1973–74
- King's Cup: 1974, 1976
- Saudi Premier League: 1980–91
- Categorization League: 1974–75

=== Individual ===
- Categorization League: 1974–75 Top scorer
