= Mohammed Ghanim (footballer) =

Qatari footballer (born 1951)

Personal information
- Full name: Mohammed Ghanim Al-Rumaihi
- Date of birth: 1 January 1951 (age 75)
- Place of birth: Doha, Qatar
- Positions: Forward; midfielder

Youth career
- 1959–: Al-Ahli

Senior career*
Years	Team	Apps	(Gls)
–1980	Al-Ahli		

International career
1968–1979	Qatar		(1)
- * Club domestic league appearances and goals

Mohammed Ghanim (Arabic: محمد غانم), is a Qatari former footballer who played for Al-Ahli and represented the Qatar national team from 1970 to 1979.

== Early life ==
Al-Rumaihi was born on January 1, 1951. His football journey began in 1956, when, at just five years old, he started playing at Salah Al-Din Al-Ayyubi School. In 1959, he joined the youth team of Al-Ahrar Club before moving on to the youth team of Al-Ahli.

== Club career ==
Ghanim played for Al-Ahli throughout his entire career till his retirement in 1980, winning the Qatari League several times, alongside leading his team to the 1972–73 Emir Cup, scoring in the final beating Al-Rayyan with an impressive scoreline of six to one. He also contributed to the team's runners-up position in the 1974–75 Emir Cup, with teammate Qasim Falah scoring a hat-trick in the final.

Although Ghanim retired from football in 1980 during a match between Al-Ahli of Qatar and Al-Ahly of Egypt at Khalifa International Stadium, his skill and accomplishments continue to be remembered with every Gulf Cup tournament. In Qatar, he is fondly known as “The Maestro.”

== International career ==
Ghanim made his international debut in 1968 in Doha, facing the Palestine national football team. His first official appearance came in the Gulf Cup came in 1970, where he played against Bahrain. He captained the national team in the fourth Gulf Cup in 1976, held in Doha, and again in the fifth edition in Baghdad in 1979. Ghanim scored in a 3–1 loss against rivals Saudi Arabia in the 1974 Gulf Cup. And was also selected as the Player of the Tournament in the competition. He played his final match for the national team against Bahrain, during the fifth Gulf Cup held in Iraq in 1979 before retiring from international football.

== Honours ==
=== Club ===
- Emir Cup:
  - Winners (1): 1972–73

== Outside football ==
Ghanim served as the president of Al-Ahli from 1973 until 1979. To honour his career, for the FIFA U-17 World Cup, the Aspire Zone Pitch 1 was named after him.
