= Taleb Ballan =

Qatari referee (Unknown birthdate)

- Full name: Taleb Ballan Saber
- Born: Doha, Qatar

Domestic
Years	League	Role
1976–1981	Emir Cup	Referee

International
Years	League	Role
1976–19??	FIFA listed	Referee

Taleb Ballan (Arabic: طالب بلان), is a former Qatari FIFA football referee, he holds the record with the most Emir Cup finals participated in by a referee.

== Playing career ==
Ballan played for Al-Esteqlal, and also guided them to the 1973/74 Emir Cup title. Ballan alongside his brother, Khaled Ballan, were both selected for the 1970 Gulf Cup.

== Refereeing career ==
Ballan would go on to officiate matches as a referee after retiring from professional football.

In 1976, Ballan was selected to be one of the match officials alongside fellow referee Mubarak Waleed, for the 1976 Gulf Cup held in Doha, Qatar. In the tournament, he supervised only one match, which was Kuwait against Oman which resulted in a 8–0 win for Kuwait.

Ballan would also supervise several matches in the Qatari League during the 1980s, he also holds the record for being the referee who has supervised the most Emir Cup finals. With him participating in four Emir Cup finals.

== Post-retirement ==
Ballan would go on to serve as the head of the referee committee.

== Personal life ==
Ballan's brother Khaled Ballan represented the Qatar national team during the early 1970s. His son Hani Ballan was also became a referee from 1998–2004. He also became the chief executive officer of the highest tier of professional football league in Qatar.

== Honours ==
=== Player ===
- Emir Cup
  - Champions (1): 1973–74
