= Hani Ballan =

Qatari businessman

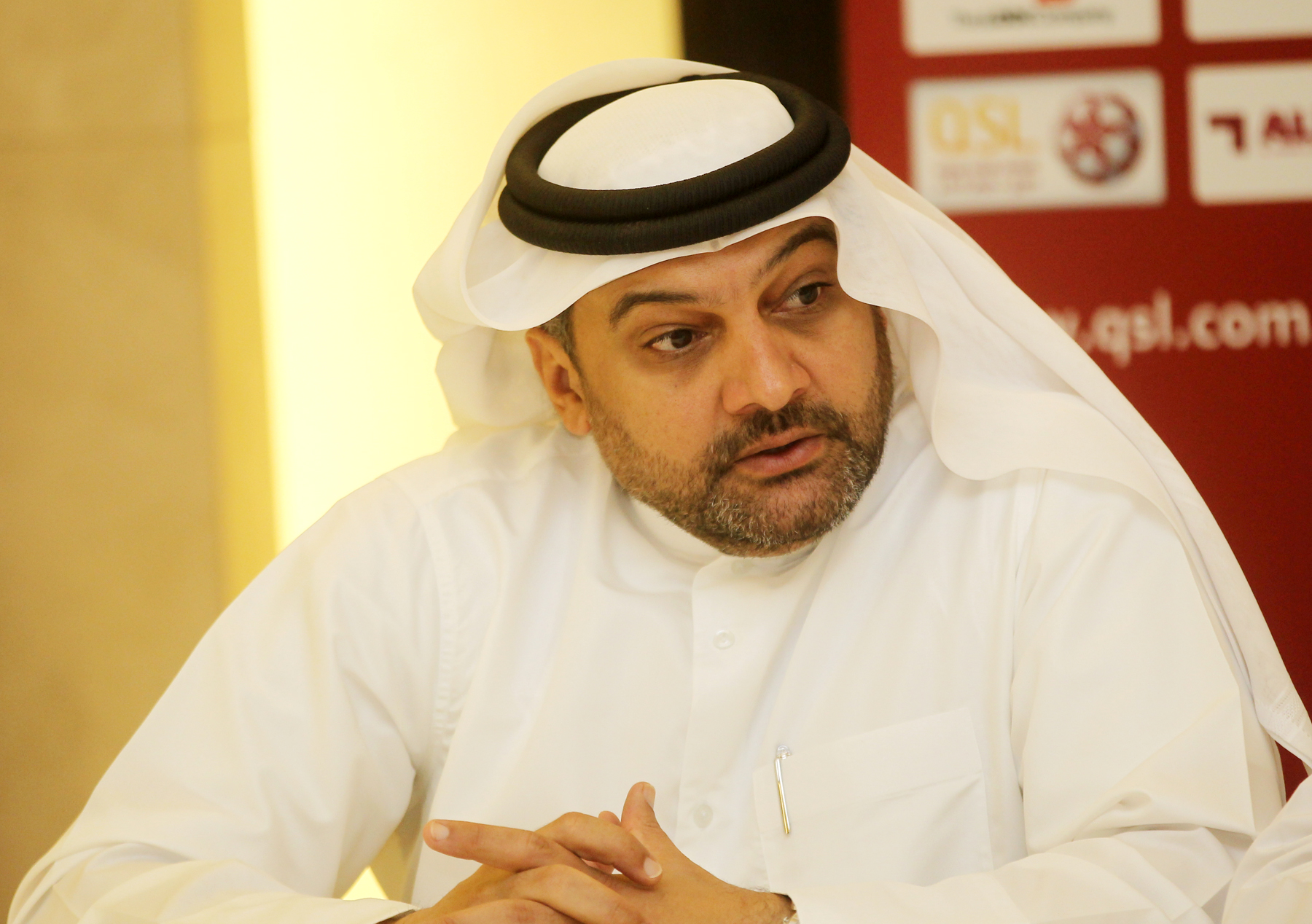
- Hani Ballan at a press conference in Doha (2012)
- Born: 13 July 1967 (age 58)
- Education: Degree in Mechanical Engineering from Oxford Brookes University
- Alma mater: Oxford Brookes University, Lille University of Science and Technology
- Years active: 2014 - present
- Known for: Chief Executive Officer of Qatar Stars League

Hani Taleb Ballan (born 13 July 1967) is the chief executive officer of the highest tier of professional football league in Qatar, the Qatar Stars League (QSL), a position he has held since 2014.

== Education ==
Ballan studied mechanical engineering at Oxford Brookes University in England, UK. He also holds a Pre-Masters Diploma in Project Management from a course he took in Paris, France at the Lille University of Science and Technology.

== Refereeing career ==
Ballan began his career as a professional referee in 1992 and spent a total of 12 years officiating the game. He refereed at top-level football in Qatar, known at the time as the Qatar Professional League. He also enjoyed a long spell as an official FIFA Referee (1998–2004). Ballan's career as a referee saw him officiating in a number of high-profile tournaments, such as the 1998 Asian Games in Bangkok, in the 2002 World Cup qualifiers for Japan/Korea, the Arab League Competitions (1998–2004), and the prestigious GCC Gulf Cup (1998–2004).

== Life after refereeing ==
Over the years Ballan has worked with a number of footballing bodies in various capacities, specifically as a referee instructor, conducting many courses around the world. He has worked for FIFA and the AFC as a referee recruiter, instructor and assessor.

Ballan also held a number of official posts in Qatari football such as the Vice Chairman of the Referees committee since 2007. He then became the Chairman of the Referees Development Programme in the same year. In 2009, he became the Deputy League Director for Sport and in the same year he also became the Chairman of the AFC Follow-up ACL Criteria Committee.

Ballan has also been a member of the QFA Competition Committee since 2010. He worked as the Manager of Club Licensing from 2010. In 2012, Ballan became the Senior Advisor to the Qatar Professional League Management Chairman.

In 2012, he became the Deputy CEO of the Qatar Stars League. In 2014, following a successful two-year run Ballan was promoted to the position of CEO. Following this role Ballan was appointed Deputy Chairman for AFC Referees Committee in 2015, along with being appointed a member of FIFA Referees Committee in 2017.

Aside his professional career Ballan is a celebrated author penning two books titled My Vision on Refereeing along with My Vision on Professionalism. Whilst Ballan also supervised the Arabic translation and production of “IFAB ‘Laws of the game” and its considerations.

Ballan is responsible for all matters that concern the QSL. Ballan, along with other senior officials at the QSL oversaw the expansion of the Qatar Stars League from 10 clubs to its current level of 14 member clubs. QSL continues to be a place where big names in the football world have come to play their trade. The league also acts as a place to develop young Qatari talent with the aim of improving the Qatar National Team.

== Personal life ==
Ballan's father, Taleb Ballan, was also a FIFA referee. His uncle Khaled Ballan, who passed away in the 1980s, also represented the Qatar national team in the 1970s.
