= 3rd Arabian Gulf Cup =

International football tournament in 1974

1974 Arabian Gulf Cup
دورة كأس الخليج العربي الثالثة (in Arabic)

Tournament details
- Host country: Kuwait
- Dates: 15–29 March
- Teams: 6
- Venue: 1 (in 1 host city)

Final positions
- Champions: Kuwait (3rd title)
- Runners-up: Saudi Arabia
- Third place: Qatar
- Fourth place: United Arab Emirates

Tournament statistics
- Matches played: 13
- Goals scored: 45 (3.46 per match)
- Top scorer: (Kuwait) Jasem Yaqoub (6 goals)
- Best player: (Qatar) Mohammed Ghanim
- Best goalkeeper: (Kuwait) Ahmed Al-Tarabulsi

The 3rd Arabian Gulf Cup (Arabic: دورة كأس الخليج العربي الثالثة) was the third edition of the Arabian Gulf Cup. The tournament was held in Kuwait City, Kuwait, and was won by two-time defending champions and hosts Kuwait. The tournament took place between 15 and 29 March 1974. All matches were played at the Al Kuwait Sports Club Stadium.

Oman took part in the competition for the first time. Kuwait defeated Saudi Arabia 4–0 in the final to win their third title in a row. The victory meant that Kuwait had earned the privilege of keeping the trophy permanently.

The number of teams in this edition increased from five to six and the format of the competition changed. Instead of one round-robin group, the six nations were split into two groups of three. The top two from each group qualified for the semi-finals with each group winner facing the other group's runner-up. The winners of the semi-finals faced each other in the final while the defeated semi-finalists played the third-place play-off.

== Teams ==
Team	Previous appearances in tournament (Note: Bold indicates champion for that year. Italic indicates host for that year.)
Bahrain	2 (1970, 1972)
Kuwait (host)	2 (**1970**, **1972**)
Oman	0 (debut)
Qatar	2 (1970, 1972)
Saudi Arabia	2 (1970, 1972)
United Arab Emirates	1 (1972)

== Venues ==
3rd Arabian Gulf Cup is located in Kuwait	Kuwait City
3rd Arabian Gulf Cup is located in Kuwait	Al Kuwait Sports Club Stadium
3rd Arabian Gulf Cup is located in Kuwait	Capacity: **15,000**

== Match officials ==
Country	Referee
Bahrain	Ali Kamenjah
England	Matthews
Iraq	Sami Naji
Italy	Riccardo Lattanzi
Kuwait	Abdulrahman Al-Bakr
Kuwait	Jaber Al-Jalahemah
Kuwait	Abdulsalam Al-Yaqout
Saudi Arabia	Ghazi Kayal

== Preliminary round ==
15 March 1974
20:00

Kuwait	2–0	United Arab Emirates
Yaqoub 15'; Al-Mula 57'	Report

Al Kuwait Sports Club Stadium, Kuwait City
Referee: Riccardo Lattanzi (Italy)

16 March 1974
16:00

Bahrain	4–0	Oman
Bushager 1', 35', 89'; Zuleikh 83'	Report

Al Kuwait Sports Club Stadium, Kuwait City
Referee: Ghazi Kayal (Saudi Arabia)

16 March 1974
20:00

Saudi Arabia	2–0	Qatar
Al-Mughnem 30'; Bakhit 57'	Report

Al Kuwait Sports Club Stadium, Kuwait City
Referee: Jaber Al-Jalahemah (Kuwait)

== First round ==
All times are local, AST (UTC+3).

=== Group A ===
Pos	Team	Pld	W	D	L	GF	GA	GD	Pts	Qualification
1	Kuwait (H)	2	2	0	0	6	0	+6	**4**	Advance to knockout stage
2	Qatar	2	1	0	1	4	1	+3	**2**	Advance to knockout stage
3	Oman	2	0	0	2	0	9	−9	**0**	

Source: GulfCup.com
(H) Hosts
19 March 1974
20:00

Kuwait	5–0	Oman
Yaqoub 8' (pen.); Al-Mula 50', 60', 67'; Kameel 85'	Report

Al Kuwait Sports Club Stadium, Kuwait City
Referee: Ali Kamenjah (Bahrain)

22 March 1974
20:00

Qatar	4–0	Oman
Saad 7'; Daf'allah 20'; Bashir 55' (pen.); Zain 72'	Report

Al Kuwait Sports Club Stadium, Kuwait City
Referee: Riccardo Lattanzi (Italy)

24 March 1974
16:00

Kuwait	1–0	Qatar
Yaqoub 13'	Report

Al Kuwait Sports Club Stadium, Kuwait City
Referee: Ghazi Kayal (Saudi Arabia)

=== Group B ===
Pos	Team	Pld	W	D	L	GF	GA	GD	Pts	Qualification
1	Saudi Arabia	2	2	0	0	6	1	+5	**4**	Advance to knockout stage
2	United Arab Emirates	2	1	0	1	4	2	+2	**2**	Advance to knockout stage
3	Bahrain	2	0	0	2	1	8	−7	**0**	

Source: GulfCup.com
18 March 1974
20:00

United Arab Emirates	4–0	Bahrain
Salem 41'; Sultan 57', 90'; Rabee 78'	Report

Al Kuwait Sports Club Stadium, Kuwait City
Referee: Abdulsalam Al-Yaqout (Kuwait)

21 March 1974
20:00

Saudi Arabia	4–1	Bahrain
Ghorab 2'; Asiri 46'; Al-Turki 47'; Al-Mughnem 81'	Report	Ali 33'

Al Kuwait Sports Club Stadium, Kuwait City
Referee: Matthews (England)

23 March 1974
16:00

Saudi Arabia	2–0	United Arab Emirates
Ghorab 15'; Al-Mughnem 30'	Report

Al Kuwait Sports Club Stadium, Kuwait City
Referee: Abdulrahman Al-Bakr (Kuwait)

== Knockout stage ==
All times are local, AST (UTC+3).

Semi-finals
26 March – Kuwait City
**Kuwait**	**6**
United Arab Emirates	0
27 March – Kuwait City
**Saudi Arabia**	**3**
Qatar	1

Final
29 March – Kuwait City
**Kuwait**	**4**
Saudi Arabia	0
Third place
29 March – Kuwait City
**Qatar (pen.)**	**1 (3)**
United Arab Emirates	1 (0)

=== Semi-finals ===
26 March 1974
20:00

Kuwait	6–0	United Arab Emirates
Yaqoub 10', 30', 47'; Shoaib 12'; Mohammed 46'; Kameel 67'	Report

Al Kuwait Sports Club Stadium, Kuwait City
Referee: Matthews (England)

27 March 1974
16:00

Saudi Arabia	3–1	Qatar
Abdulmatloub 4'; Ghorab 32'; Al-Mughnem 60'	Report	Ghanim 51'

Al Kuwait Sports Club Stadium, Kuwait City
Referee: Sami Naji (Iraq)

=== Third place play-off ===
29 March 1974
16:00

Qatar	1–1 (a.e.t.)	United Arab Emirates
Ali 64'	Report	Boshanain 24'
Penalties
	3–0

Al Kuwait Sports Club Stadium, Kuwait City
Referee: Jaber Al-Jalahemah (Kuwait)

=== Final ===
30 March 1974
20:00

Kuwait	4–0	Saudi Arabia
Kameel 1', 55'; Bouhamad 9', 16'	Report

Al Kuwait Sports Club Stadium, Kuwait City
Referee: Sami Naji (Iraq)

=== Winners ===
3rd Arabian Gulf Cup winners

**Kuwait**
**Third title**

== Statistics ==
=== Goalscorers ===
There were 45 goals scored in 13 matches, for an average of 3.46 goals per match.

6 goals

- (Kuwait) Jasem Yaqoub

4 goals

- (Kuwait) Ali Al-Mula
- (Kuwait) Fathi Kameel
- (Saudi Arabia) Mohammed Al-Mughnem

3 goals

- (Bahrain) Fuad Bushaqer
- (Saudi Arabia) Saeed Ghorab

2 goals

- (Kuwait) Hamad Bouhamad
- (United Arab Emirates) Salem Sultan

1 goal

- (Bahrain) Hassan Ali
- (Bahrain) Hassan Zulaikh
- (Kuwait) Hussain Mohammed
- (Kuwait) Mohammed Shoaib
- (Qatar) Saif Ali
- (Qatar) Anbar Bashir
- (Qatar) Salah Daf'allah
- (Qatar) Mohammad Ghanim
- (Qatar) Abdulkhaliq Saad
- (Qatar) Abdulamir Zain
- (Saudi Arabia) Naji Abdulmatloub
- (Saudi Arabia) Khaled Al-Turki
- (Saudi Arabia) Ali Asiri
- (Saudi Arabia) Mohsen Bakhit
- (United Arab Emirates) Salem Boshanain
- (United Arab Emirates) Zaid Rabee
- (United Arab Emirates) Suhail Salem

=== Awards ===
Player of the Tournament

- (Qatar) Mohammed Ghanim

Top Scorer

- (Kuwait) Jasem Yaqoub (6 goals)

Goalkeeper of the Tournament

- (Kuwait) Ahmed Al-Tarabulsi
