= Antonio Vieira (disambiguation) =

António Vieira (1608–1697) was a Portuguese Jesuit philosopher and writer.

Antonio Vieira may also refer to:

- Antonio de Vieira or Anton de Vieira (1682?–1745), Russian administrator of Portuguese origin
- António Vieira (Portuguese footballer) (1912–?), Portuguese footballer
- Antonio Carlos Vieira (born 1956), former Brazilian football player and manager
- Antônio Vieira (football manager), Brazilian football coach
