= Mubarak Faraj (footballer) =

Qatari footballer (born 1948)

Personal information
- Full name: Mubarak Faraj Al-Ali
- Date of birth: 1948 (age 77–78)
- Place of birth: Doha, Qatar
- Position: Forward

Senior career*
Years	Team	Apps	(Gls)
- Al-Ahrar
- Al-Oruba
- Al-Najah
- Al-Rayyan

International career
1970	Qatar	3	(1)
- * Club domestic league appearances and goals

Mubarak Faraj Al-Ali, simply known as Mubarak Faraj, (Arabic: مبارك فرج العلي; born 1954) is a former Qatari footballer who played for the Qatar national team in the 1970s. He is well-known for scoring the Qatar national team's first ever goal in an international game, at the 1970 Gulf Cup.

== Early life ==
Faraj was born in 1948, at Doha, Qatar. Early in his school years, he joined various scouting movements at Khalid bin Al-Walid Primary School. He would then participate in numerous local and international scouting camps and activities, along with a scouting delegation to Morocco in 1962, which included several members of the first generation of Qatari scouts.

== Club career ==
Faraj emerged as a prominent footballer during the 1960s and early 1970s. Being associated with several Qatari League clubs, such as, Al-Ahrar, Al-Orouba, Al-Najah, and Al-Rayyan.

== International career ==
In 1970, Faraj represented and captained the Qatar national team at the 1970 Gulf Cup, held in Bahrain. Where he scored the national team's first ever goal in the opening match on 27 March 1970, against Bahrain through a penalty in the 55th minute.

== Later life ==
After retiring from football, Faraj transitioned into refereeing. He became an international football referee and officiated in both domestic and international matches. He also worked in the Ministry of Education and Youth Welfare between 1970 and 1977, and then transferred to the Ministry of Foreign Affairs, where he performed his duties until 1980, from 1980 onwards, he assisted the Supreme Council for Youth Welfare from 1980, along with the Olympic Committee until his retirement from work in 2006.
