= Hassan Zuleikh =

Bahraini former footballer

Hassan Zulikh
Personal information
- Full name: Hassan Abdullah Zulikh
- Date of birth: 1954 (age 71–72)
- Place of birth: Manama, Bahrain
- Position: Striker

Senior career*
Years	Team	Apps	(Gls)
1965–1977	Al-Nusoor		

International career
1966–1974	Bahrain	65	(??)
- * Club domestic league appearances and goals

Hassan Zuleikh, alternatively spelled as Hassan Zalikh (Arabic: حسن زليخ; born 1954) is a former association footballer, who played as a striker for the Bahrain national football team in the late 1960s to early 1970s. Nicknamed The Rocket, Zulikh was known for his incredible powerful shooting and dribbling abilities.

== Early life ==
Zulikh was born in the neighbourhood of Al-Mukharqa, Manama, Bahrain.

== Club career ==
In 1963, Zulikh participated in the 1963 Arab School Games held in Kuwait.

Zulikh began his career with Ras Rumman Club, before joining Al-Nusoor in 1965, being promoted from their academy. He was also crowned the top goal-scorer of the Bahraini league eight times, including a remarkable achievement of obtaining the award six consecutive times in a row.

== International career ==
In 1966, Zulikh would be called up to the Bahrain football team for the 1966 Arab Cup, held in Baghdad, Iraq. He would score in a 1–5 loss against Jordan.

Four years later, Zulikh would participate with the national team at the 1970 Gulf Cup, where he scored in the opening match of the tournament against Qatar. In the next tournament, Zulikh scored a hat-trick in an annulled match against Qatar which ended 6–2 for Bahrain. Many sources state this as the first ever hat-trick in the Arabian Gulf Cup, however, two days previous, Saeed Ghorab managed to find the net three times in their match against UAE.

Zulikh last played for the national team at the 1974 Gulf Cup, finding the net in a match against Oman in the 83rd minute. The same tournament, he faced severe health issues, which ended up forcing him to retire from the national team.

== Honours ==
=== Al Ahli ===
- Bahraini Premier League:
  - Winners (3): 1969, 1972, 1977
- Bahraini King's Cup:
  - Winners (2): 1968, 1977
