= 1974–75 Saudi Categorization League =

Saudi Categorization League
- Season: 1974–75
- Champions: Al-Nassr (1st title)
- Promoted: Al-Nassr; Al-Qadsiah; Al-Shabab; Al-Ittihad; Al-Ahli; Al-Hilal; Al-Wehda; Al-Yamamah
- Relegated: Al-Nahda; Ohod; Okaz; Al-Kefah; Al-Ettifaq; Al-Ansar; Al-Rabe’e; Al-Khaleej
- Matches: 93
- Goals: 186 (2 per match)
- Top goalscorer: (Saudi Arabia) Mohammad S. Abdeli (13 goals)
- Biggest home win: Al-Ahli 9–0 Al-Khaleej (13 February 1975)
- Biggest away win: Al-Khaleej 0–7 Al-Ahli (3 December 1974)
- Longest winning run: 5 matches Al-Nassr
- Longest unbeaten run: 14 matches Al-Hilal
- Longest winless run: 14 matches Al-Khaleej; Al-Kefah
- Longest losing run: 14 matches Al-Kefah

Categorization League was a League that included all top-performing clubs from their respective regional leagues of the East, West, and Central regions. The League was titled The Categorization League (Arabic: الدوري التصنيفي), because it categorized which clubs play in the Premier League and which clubs play in the First Division League and was a transitional League, making an end to Saudi Regional Leagues.

== Overview ==
Sixteen teams took part on a home and away basis. The top four from each group qualified for the next official Premier League, whereas the bottom four of each group were removed from the league until the inclusion of the First Division League.

The League was won by Al-Nassr.

== Clubs ==
The 1974–75 Saudi Categorization League was contested by the top 16 teams in Saudi football at the time. Al-Ahli, Al-Ansar, Al-Ittihad, Al-Kefah, Al-Rabe'e, Al-Wehda, Ohod, and Okaz played in the top tier of the Western League at the time. Al-Hilal, Al-Nassr, Al-Shabab, and Al-Yamamah played in the top tier of the Central League at the time. Al-Ettifaq, Al-Khaleej, Al-Nahda, and Al-Qadsiah played in the top tier of the Eastern League at the time.

Group A

Locations of teams in the 1974–75 Saudi Categorization League Group A

Club	Location	Stadium	Head coach
Al-Ahli	Jeddah	Youth Welfare Stadium in Jeddah	(Egypt) Taha Ismail
Al-Ansar	Medina	Education Stadium	
Al-Ettifaq	Dammam	Youth Welfare Stadium in Dammam	(England) Ted Copeland
Al-Hilal	Riyadh	Youth Welfare Stadium in Al-Malaz	
Al-Khaleej	Saihat	Youth Welfare Stadium in Dammam	
Al-Rabe'e	Jeddah	Youth Welfare Stadium in Jeddah	
Al-Wehda	Mecca	Islam Square Stadium	(Egypt) Raafat Attia
Al-Yamamah	Riyadh	Youth Welfare Stadium in Al-Malaz	

Group B

Locations of teams in the 1974–75 Saudi Categorization League Group B

Club	Location	Stadium	Head coach
Al-Ittihad	Jeddah	Youth Welfare Stadium in Jeddah	
Al-Kefah	Mecca	Islam Square Stadium	
Al-Nahda	Dammam	Youth Welfare Stadium in Dammam	
Al-Nassr	Riyadh	Youth Welfare Stadium in Al-Malaz	(Egypt) Mahmoud Abou-Regaila
Al-Qadsiah	Khobar	Youth Welfare Stadium in Dammam	
Al-Shabab	Riyadh	Youth Welfare Stadium in Al-Malaz	
Ohod	Medina	Education Stadium	
Okaz	Taif	Okaz Club Stadium	

=== Foreign players ===
Club	Player 1
Al-Ahli	
Al-Ansar	
Al-Ettifaq	(England) Ted Copeland
Al-Hilal	(Tunisia) Ali Kaabi
Al-Ittihad	(Tunisia) Taoufik Belghith
Al-Kefah	
Al-Khaleej	
Al-Nahda	
Al-Nassr	
Al-Qadsiah	
Al-Rabe'e	
Al-Shabab	
Al-Wehda	
Al-Yamamah	
Ohod	
Okaz	

== League tables ==
=== Group A ===
Table

Pos	Team	Pld	W	D	L	GF	GA	GD	Pts	Promotion, qualification or relegation
1	Al-Hilal	14	11	3	0	34	8	+26	25	Qualification to the Final
2	Al-Ahli	14	9	3	2	41	10	+31	21	
3	Al-Wehda	14	9	3	2	28	10	+18	21	
4	Al-Yamamah	14	6	4	4	17	20	−3	16	
5	Al-Ettifaq (R)	14	5	5	4	26	13	+13	15	Relegation to the First Division
6	Al-Ansar (R)	14	2	3	9	10	27	−17	7	Relegation to the First Division
7	Al-Rabe'e (R)	14	2	0	12	15	35	−20	4	Relegation to the First Division
8	Al-Khaleej (R)	14	1	1	12	15	63	−48	3	Relegation to the First Division

Source: rsssf
(R) Relegated

=== Group B ===
Table

Pos	Team	Pld	W	D	L	GF	GA	GD	Pts	Promotion, qualification or relegation
1	Al-Nassr	14	8	5	1	24	8	+16	21	Qualification to the Final
2	Al-Ittihad	14	6	7	1	26	10	+16	19	
3	Al-Shabab	14	8	3	3	25	16	+9	19	
4	Al-Qadsiah	14	7	3	4	28	25	+3	17	
5	Al-Nahda (R)	14	5	6	3	28	19	+9	16	Relegation to the First Division
6	Ohod (R)	14	5	3	6	22	17	+5	13	Relegation to the First Division
7	Okaz (R)	14	2	3	9	10	35	−25	7	Relegation to the First Division
8	Al-Kefah (R)	14	0	0	14	11	44	−33	0	Relegation to the First Division

Source: rsssf
(R) Relegated

== Final match ==
14 March 1975

Al-Nassr	3–1	Al-Hilal
Hassan Abu Eid 56'; Fayez Al-Bishi 59'; Mohammad S. Abdeli 72'		Naji Abdul Matloob 90'

Prince Faisal bin Fahd Stadium, Riyadh
Referee: Mohammed Al-Marzouq

Saudi Categorization League
1974–75 winners

1st title
