= 5th Arabian Gulf Cup =

International football tournament in 1979

1979 Arabian Gulf Cup
دورة كأس الخليج العربي الخامسة (in Arabic)

Tournament details
- Host country: Iraq
- Dates: 23 March – 9 April
- Teams: 7
- Venue: 1 (in 1 host city)

Final positions
- Champions: Iraq (1st title)
- Runners-up: Kuwait
- Third place: Saudi Arabia
- Fourth place: Bahrain

Tournament statistics
- Matches played: 21
- Goals scored: 70 (3.33 per match)
- Top scorer: (Iraq) Hussein Saeed (10 goals)
- Best player: (Iraq) Hadi Ahmed
- Best goalkeeper: (Iraq) Raad Hammoudi

The 5th Arabian Gulf Cup (Arabic: دورة كأس الخليج العربي الخامسة) was the fifth edition of the Arabian Gulf Cup. The tournament was held at the Al-Shaab Stadium in Baghdad, Iraq and took place from 23 March to 9 April 1979. Hosts Iraq won their first ever title after defeating Saudi Arabia 2–0, becoming the second team to win the competition after Kuwait.

Originally, the tournament was scheduled to take place in 1978 and hosted in Abu Dhabi, the United Arab Emirates, but it was delayed after the UAE gave up their hosting rights.

== Teams ==
Team	Previous appearances in tournament (Note: Bold indicates champion for that year. Italic indicates host for that year.)
Bahrain	4 (1970, 1972, 1974, 1976)
Iraq (hosts)	1 (1976)
Kuwait	4 (**1970**, **1972**, **1974**, **1976**)
Oman	2 (1974, 1976)
Qatar	4 (1970, 1972, 1974, 1976)
Saudi Arabia	4 (1970, 1972, 1974, 1976)
United Arab Emirates	3 (1972, 1974, 1976)

== Venues ==
5th Arabian Gulf Cup is located in Iraq	Baghdad
5th Arabian Gulf Cup is located in Iraq	Al-Shaab Stadium
5th Arabian Gulf Cup is located in Iraq	Capacity: **40,000**

== Match officials ==
Country	Referee
Bahrain	Ibrahim Al-Doy
India	Kim
India	Alex Vaz
Iraq	Sami Naji
Kuwait	Ahmed Al-Misfer
Malaysia	Sivapalan Kathiravale
Qatar	Rostam Baqer
Saudi Arabia	Fahad Al-Dahmash
Singapore	Nadasen Chandra
Thailand	Vijit Getkaew
United Arab Emirates	Khalfan Ali

== Tournament ==
The seven teams in the tournament played a single round-robin style competition. The team achieving first place in the overall standings was the tournament winner.

All times are local, AST (UTC+3).

Team	Pld	W	D	L	GF	GA	GD	Pts
Iraq	6	6	0	0	23	1	+22	12
Kuwait	6	4	1	1	15	4	+11	9
Saudi Arabia	6	3	2	1	14	4	+10	8
Bahrain	6	2	2	2	8	9	−1	6
Qatar	6	2	1	3	4	13	−9	5
United Arab Emirates	6	1	0	5	5	18	−13	2
Oman	6	0	0	6	1	21	−20	1

=== Matches ===
23 March 1979
17:00

Iraq	4–0	Bahrain
Saeed 48', 88', 90'; Shaker 64'	Report

Al-Shaab Stadium, Baghdad
Referee: Vijit Getkaew (Thailand)
24 March 1979
14:30

Saudi Arabia	2–1	United Arab Emirates
Naseeb 22'; Abdullah 71'	Report	Easa 51'

Al-Shaab Stadium, Baghdad
Referee: Ibrahim Al-Doy (Bahrain)
24 March 1979
17:00

Kuwait	3–1	Qatar
Al-Suwayed 19'; Al-Buloushi 34', 79'	Report	Mattar 56'

Al-Shaab Stadium, Baghdad
Referee: Sivapalan Kathiravale (Malaysia)

27 March 1979
14:30

Bahrain	3–0	United Arab Emirates
Shuwaier 5'; Zowayed 12' (pen.); Al-Hayiki 18'	Report

Al-Shaab Stadium, Baghdad
Referee: Sami Naji (Iraq)
27 March 1979
17:00

Iraq	2–0	Qatar
Saeed 1', 60' (pen.)	Report

Al-Shaab Stadium, Baghdad
Referee: Sivapalan Kathiravale (Malaysia)
28 March 1979
14:30

Saudi Arabia	4–0	Oman
Jassem 34', 54'; Khalifa 69'; Abdullah 75'	Report

Al-Shaab Stadium, Baghdad
Referee: Nadasen Chandra (Singapore)

29 March 1979
14:30

United Arab Emirates	0–1	Qatar
	Report	Muftah 40'

Al-Shaab Stadium, Baghdad
Referee: Vijit Getkaew (Thailand)
30 March 1979
14:30

Bahrain	3–1	Oman
Zowayed 13'; Al-Zayani 35'; Shuwaier 88'	Report	Sumar 53'

Al-Shaab Stadium, Baghdad
Referee: Fahad Al-Dahmash (Saudi Arabia)
30 March 1979
17:00

Kuwait	1–3	Iraq
Juma'a 75'	Report	Hassan 9'; Ahmed 47'; Abdul-Sahib 90'

Al-Shaab Stadium, Baghdad
Referee: Kim (India)

1 April 1979
14:30

Qatar	1–0	Oman
Daham 33'	Report

Al-Shaab Stadium, Baghdad
Referee: Ahmed Al-Misfer (Kuwait)
1 April 1979
17:00

United Arab Emirates	0–7	Kuwait
	Report	Saad 14'; Al-Suwayed 43', 80'; Kameel 45'; Al-Buloushi 47', 88'; Al-Dakhil 84'

Al-Shaab Stadium, Baghdad
Referee: Rostam Baqer (Qatar)
2 April 1979
14:30

Saudi Arabia	1–1	Bahrain
Jassem 53'	Report	Ghaith 41'

Al-Shaab Stadium, Baghdad
Referee: Khalfan Ali (United Arab Emirates)

3 April 1979
14:30

Oman	0–2	Kuwait
	Report	Al-Suwayed 40', 47'

Al-Shaab Stadium, Baghdad
Referee: Nadasen Chandra (Singapore)
4 April 1979
14:30

Saudi Arabia	7–0	Qatar
Abdullah 14', 15', 45', 48', 55'; Hamdan 32'; Abdoraboh 89'	Report

Al-Shaab Stadium, Baghdad
Referee: Alex Vaz (India)
4 April 1979
17:00

United Arab Emirates	0–5	Iraq
	Report	Ahmed 25'; Abdul-Sahib 40'; Hassan 49'; Saeed 66'; Khudhair 85'

Al-Shaab Stadium, Baghdad

6 April 1979
14:30

Saudi Arabia	0–0	Kuwait
	Report

Al-Shaab Stadium, Baghdad
Referee: Vijit Getkaew (Thailand)
6 April 1979
17:00

Oman	0–7	Iraq
	Report	Saeed 30', 32', 40', 86'; Hassan 43', 50'; Khudhair 52'

Al-Shaab Stadium, Baghdad
Referee: Khalfan Ali (United Arab Emirates)
7 April 1979
14:30

Qatar	1–1	Bahrain
Bashir 27' (pen.)	Report	Shuwaier 77'

Al-Shaab Stadium, Baghdad
Referee: Fahad Al-Dahmash (Saudi Arabia)

8 April 1979
14:30

Iraq	2–0	Saudi Arabia
Hassan 24'; Farhan 36'	Report

Al-Shaab Stadium, Baghdad
Referee: Ibrahim Al-Doy (Bahrain)
9 April 1979
14:30

Kuwait	2–0	Bahrain
Al-Suwayed 19', 84'	Report

Al-Shaab Stadium, Baghdad
9 April 1979
17:00

Oman	0–4	United Arab Emirates
	Report	Abdulrahman 29'; Tshombe 43'; Boshanain 73'; Abdullah 77'

Al-Shaab Stadium, Baghdad
Referee: Ahmed Al-Misfer (Kuwait)

=== Winners ===
5th Arabian Gulf Cup winners

**Iraq**
**First title**

== Statistics ==
=== Goalscorers ===
There were 70 goals scored in 21 matches, for an average of 3.33 goals per match.

10 goals

- (Iraq) Hussein Saeed

7 goals

- (Kuwait) Yussef Al-Suwayed
- (Saudi Arabia) Majed Abdullah

5 goals

- (Iraq) Falah Hassan

4 goals

- (Kuwait) Abdullah Al-Buloushi

3 goals

- (Bahrain) Khalil Shuwaier
- (Saudi Arabia) Saud Jassem

2 goals

- (Bahrain) Ibrahim Zowayed
- (Iraq) Mahdi Abdul-Sahib
- (Iraq) Hadi Ahmed
- (Iraq) Adel Khudhair

1 goal

- (Bahrain) Abdulhadi Al-Hayiki
- (Bahrain) Mohammed Al-Zayani
- (Bahrain) Kamel Ghaith
- (Iraq) Hassan Farhan
- (Iraq) Nadhim Shaker
- (Kuwait) Faisal Al-Dakhil
- (Kuwait) Mahboub Juma'a
- (Kuwait) Fathi Kameel
- (Kuwait) Naeem Saad
- (Oman) Ahmad Sumar
- (Qatar) Anbar Bashir
- (Qatar) Khamis Daham
- (Qatar) Hassan Mattar
- (Qatar) Mansour Muftah
- (Saudi Arabia) Abdullah Abdoraboh
- (Saudi Arabia) Eisa Hamdan
- (Saudi Arabia) Eissa Khalifa
- (Saudi Arabia) Sultan bin Naseeb
- (United Arab Emirates) Saeed Abdullah
- (United Arab Emirates) Rajab Abdulrahman
- (United Arab Emirates) Salem Boshanain
- (United Arab Emirates) Ahmad Easa
- (United Arab Emirates) Ahmed Tshombe

=== Awards ===
Player of the Tournament

- (Iraq) Hadi Ahmed

Top Scorer

- (Iraq) Hussein Saeed (10 goals)

Goalkeeper of the Tournament

- (Iraq) Raad Hammoudi
