= List of international goals scored by Bashar Abdullah =

Bashar Abdullah is a retired Kuwaiti footballer who represented the Kuwait national football team as a forward from his debut in 1996 until 2007. He is the top goalscorer in the Kuwaiti national team's history, with 75 goals in 134 appearances, including eight in a single game against Bhutan on 14 February 2000, which Kuwait won 20–0.

== Goals ==
Scores and results list Kuwait's goal tally first.

#	Date	Venue	Opponent	Score	Result	Competition
1.	23 May 1996	Kuwait City	Syria	?	3–1	Friendly
2.	28 October 1996	Sultan Qaboos Sports Complex, Muscat	Qatar	1–0	2–1	13th Arabian Gulf Cup
3.	22 November 1996	Kuwait City	Mali	1–0	4–2	Friendly
4.	22 November 1996	Kuwait City	Mali	4–0	4–2	Friendly
5.	10 December 1996	Sheikh Zayed Stadium, Abu Dhabi	South Korea	2–0	2–0	1996 AFC Asian Cup
6.	18 February 1997	Kuwait City	Egypt	1–0	2–0	Friendly
7.	18 March 1997	Kuwait City	Bahrain	?	3–1	Friendly
8.	18 March 1997	Kuwait City	Bahrain	?	3–1	Friendly
9.	27 May 1997	Kuwait City	Zambia	1–0	2–1	Friendly
10.	5 June 1997	Kuwait City	Singapore	4–0	4–0	1998 FIFA World Cup qualification
11.	5 September 1997	Kuwait City	Mali	3–0	8–1	Friendly
12.	5 September 1997	Kuwait City	Mali	?	8–1	Friendly
13.	14 September 1997	King Fahd Stadium, Riyadh	Saudi Arabia	1–0	1–2	1998 FIFA World Cup qualification
14.	19 September 1997	Jassim Bin Hamad Stadium, Doha	Qatar	2–0	2–0	1998 FIFA World Cup qualification
15.	17 October 1997	Kuwait City	Saudi Arabia	1–1	2–1	1998 FIFA World Cup qualification
16.	26 September 1998	Jassim Bin Hamad Stadium, Doha	Syria	2–0	4–0	1998 Arab Nations Cup
17.	1 October 1998	Jassim Bin Hamad Stadium, Doha	United Arab Emirates	2–1	4–1	1998 Arab Nations Cup
18.	1 October 1998	Jassim Bin Hamad Stadium, Doha	United Arab Emirates	3–1	4–1	1998 Arab Nations Cup
19.	1 October 1998	Jassim Bin Hamad Stadium, Doha	United Arab Emirates	4–1	4–1	1998 Arab Nations Cup
20.	13 October 1998	Kuwait City	Iran	2–0	3–0	Friendly
21.	2 November 1998	Bahrain National Stadium, Riffa	Qatar	4–2	6–2	14th Arabian Gulf Cup
22.	9 November 1998	Bahrain National Stadium, Riffa	Oman	3–0	5–0	14th Arabian Gulf Cup
23.	31 January 2000	Kuwait City	Syria	1–0	4–0	Friendly
24.	31 January 2000	Kuwait City	Syria	2–0	4–0	Friendly
25.	31 January 2000	Kuwait City	Syria	3–0	4–0	Friendly
26.	10 February 2000	Kuwait City	Turkmenistan	2–0	6–1	2000 AFC Asian Cup qualification
27.	10 February 2000	Kuwait City	Turkmenistan	4–0	6–1	2000 AFC Asian Cup qualification
28.	14 February 2000	Kuwait City	Bhutan	2–0	20–0	2000 AFC Asian Cup qualification
29.	14 February 2000	Kuwait City	Bhutan	5–0	20–0	2000 AFC Asian Cup qualification
30.	14 February 2000	Kuwait City	Bhutan	8–0	20–0	2000 AFC Asian Cup qualification
31.	14 February 2000	Kuwait City	Bhutan	10–0	20–0	2000 AFC Asian Cup qualification
32.	14 February 2000	Kuwait City	Bhutan	11–0	20–0	2000 AFC Asian Cup qualification
33.	14 February 2000	Kuwait City	Bhutan	12–0	20–0	2000 AFC Asian Cup qualification
34.	14 February 2000	Kuwait City	Bhutan	16–0	20–0	2000 AFC Asian Cup qualification
35.	14 February 2000	Kuwait City	Bhutan	20–0	20–0	2000 AFC Asian Cup qualification
36.	18 February 2000	Kuwait City	Nepal	1–0	5–0	2000 AFC Asian Cup qualification
37.	18 February 2000	Kuwait City	Nepal	2–0	5–0	2000 AFC Asian Cup qualification
38.	18 February 2000	Kuwait City	Nepal	3–0	5–0	2000 AFC Asian Cup qualification
39.	18 February 2000	Kuwait City	Nepal	4–0	5–0	2000 AFC Asian Cup qualification
40.	18 February 2000	Kuwait City	Nepal	5–0	5–0	2000 AFC Asian Cup qualification
41.	25 June 2000	Tripoli Municipal Stadium, Tripoli	Lebanon	?	1–3	Friendly
42.	30 September 2000	Kuwait City	Thailand	?	3–2	Friendly
43.	24 October 2000	Camille Chamoun Sports City Stadium, Beirut	Saudi Arabia	1–1	2–3	2000 AFC Asian Cup
44.	23 January 2001	Rajamangala Stadium, Bangkok	Thailand	4–1	4–5	Friendly
45.	6 February 2001	National Stadium, Singapore	Singapore	1–0	1–1	2002 FIFA World Cup qualification
46.	31 December 2001	Kuwait City	Syria	1–1	2–2	Friendly
47.	5 January 2002	Kuwait City	Zimbabwe	1–0	3–0	Friendly
48.	30 May 2002	Kuwait City	Iran	?	1–3	Friendly
49.	23 December 2002	Kuwait City	Jordan	1–2	1–2	2002 Arab Nations Cup
50.	25 December 2002	Kuwait City	Palestine	2–3	3–3	2002 Arab Nations Cup
51.	25 December 2002	Kuwait City	Palestine	3–3	3–3	2002 Arab Nations Cup
52.	14 September 2003	Mohammed Al-Hamad Stadium, Hawally	Qatar	1–1	2–1	2004 AFC Asian Cup qualification
53.	27 September 2003	Mohammed Al-Hamad Stadium, Hawally	Singapore	1–0	4–0	2004 AFC Asian Cup qualification
54.	27 September 2003	Mohammed Al-Hamad Stadium, Hawally	Singapore	4–0	4–0	2004 AFC Asian Cup qualification
55.	8 October 2003	Mohammed Al-Hamad Stadium, Hawally	Palestine	1–0	4–0	2004 AFC Asian Cup qualification
56.	8 October 2003	Mohammed Al-Hamad Stadium, Hawally	Palestine	4–0	4–0	2004 AFC Asian Cup qualification
57.	2 December 2003	Kuwait City	Iran	1–0	3–1	Friendly
58.	2 December 2003	Kuwait City	Iran	2–0	3–1	Friendly
59.	20 December 2003	Stelios Kyriakides Stadium, Paphos	Latvia	2–0	2–0	Friendly
60.	1 January 2004	Al-Sadaqua Walsalam Stadium, Kuwait City	Yemen	2–0	4–0	16th Arabian Gulf Cup
61.	8 January 2004	Al-Sadaqua Walsalam Stadium, Kuwait City	Qatar	1–0	1–2	16th Arabian Gulf Cup
62.	19 July 2004	Shandong Sports Center, Jinan	United Arab Emirates	1–0	3–1	2004 AFC Asian Cup
63.	3 October 2004	Tripoli Municipal Stadium, Tripoli	Lebanon	1–0	3–1	Friendly
64.	5 November 2004	Kuwait City	India	2–1	2–3	Friendly
65.	10 November 2004	Kuwait City	Kyrgyzstan	?	3–0	Friendly
66.	17 November 2004	Al-Sadaqua Walsalam Stadium, Kuwait City	Malaysia	2–1	6–1	2006 FIFA World Cup qualification
67.	17 November 2004	Al-Sadaqua Walsalam Stadium, Kuwait City	Malaysia	3–1	6–1	2006 FIFA World Cup qualification
68.	6 December 2004	Kuwait City	Tajikistan	1–0	3–0	Friendly
69.	17 December 2004	Jassim Bin Hamad Stadium, Doha	Yemen	1–0	3–0	17th Arabian Gulf Cup
70.	17 December 2004	Jassim Bin Hamad Stadium, Doha	Yemen	3–0	3–0	17th Arabian Gulf Cup
71.	22 January 2005	Kuwait City	Norway	1–0	1–1	Friendly
72.	25 March 2005	Al-Sadaqua Walsalam Stadium, Kuwait City	Uzbekistan	1–0	2–1	2006 FIFA World Cup qualification
73.	25 March 2005	Al-Sadaqua Walsalam Stadium, Kuwait City	Uzbekistan	2–0	2–1	2006 FIFA World Cup qualification
74.	17 August 2005	Pakhtakor Markaziy Stadium, Tashkent	Uzbekistan	2–0	2–3	2006 FIFA World Cup qualification
75.	12 June 2007	Kuwait City	Egypt	1–0	1–1	Friendly
