= Antônio Vieira (football manager) =

Brazilian football coach

Managerial career
- Years: Team
- 1987–1988: Kuwait

Antônio Vieira was a Brazilian professional football coach who managed the Kuwaiti national team between 1987 and 1988.
