= Khaled Ballan =

Qatari footballer (1946–1983)

Personal information
- Full name: Khaled Ballan Saber Youssef
- Date of birth: 1946
- Place of birth: Doha, Qatar
- Date of death: 3 March 1983 (aged 36)
- Positions: Forward; attacking midfielder

Senior career*
Years	Team	Apps	(Gls)
- Al-Esteqlal

International career
1970–19??	Qatar		(2)
- * Club domestic league appearances and goals

Khaled Ballan (Arabic: خالد بلان; 1946 – 3 March 1983) was a Qatari football footballer who played for Al-Esteqlal and represented the Qatar national team in the 1970s.

== Club career ==
Ballan started playing for Al-Oruba in the early 1960s. And also played throughout the 1970s, where he spent his entire career at Al-Esteqlal, winning the Qatari League several times.

== International career ==
Ballan made his debut with the Qatar national team in the 1970 Gulf Cup which took place in Bahrain, where he was selected as the Player of the Tournament. Ballan also scored a goal against Kuwait and Saudi Arabia, Due to his performances in the tournament he was praised by the president of FIFA, Stanley Rous.

== Personal life ==
Ballan’s brother, Taleb Ballan, was a referee who officiated in four Emir Cup finals.

== Legacy ==
Ballan was known for being a strong and agile player, spending his entire career at Al-Esteqlal. To honour his career, for the FIFA U-17 World Cup, Aspire Zone Pitch 5 was named after him.

== Death ==
On 3 March 1983, Ballan was involved in a fatal car accident that took his life at thirty-six years old. Some sources also state he passed away in his sleep from a heart attack.
