= Hamad Khaled Mohamed =

Kuwaiti footballer

International career
Years	Team	Apps	(Gls)
- Kuwait

Hamad Khaled Mohamed is a Kuwaiti footballer. He competed in the men's tournament at the 1980 Summer Olympics.
