= Saeed Ghorab =

Saudi Arabian footballer (born 1942)

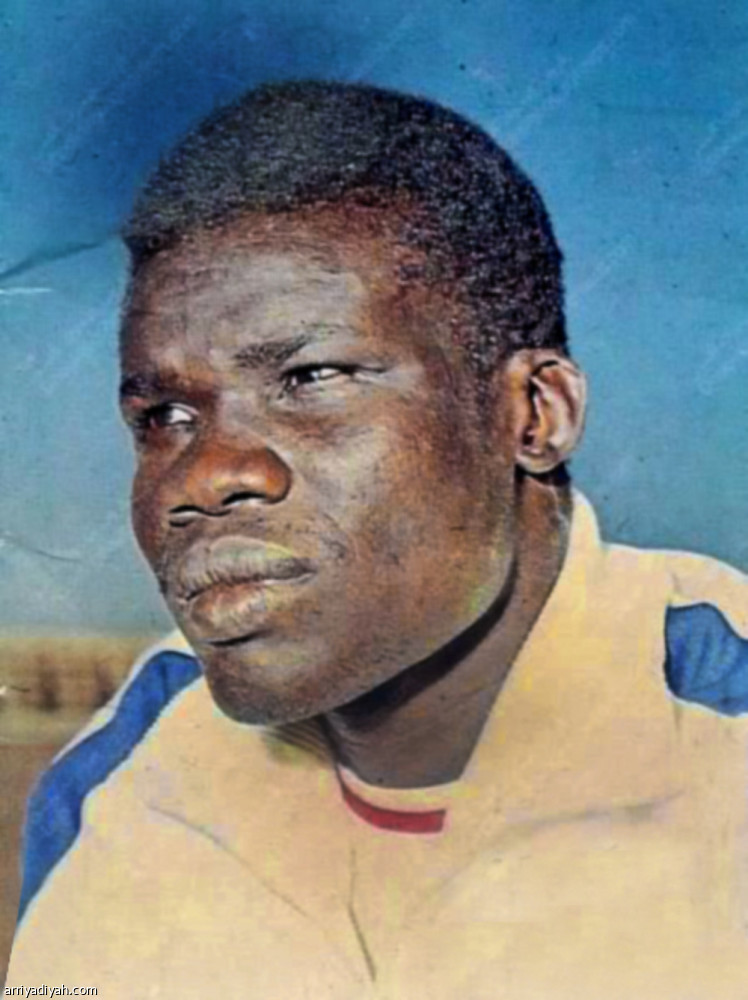
- Ghorab with Al-Nassr, c. 1970

Personal information
- Full name: Saeed Madhkour Al-Ghamdi
- Date of birth: 18 January 1942 (age 84)
- Place of birth: Al-Dhafir, Al Bahah, Saudi Arabia
- Position: Striker

Youth career
- Al-Ahli
- Al-Ittihad

Senior career*
Years	Team	Apps	(Gls)
- Al-Ittihad
- Al-Nassr
- Al-Ahli

International career
1967–1974	Saudi Arabia	14	(12)
- * Club domestic league appearances and goals

Saeed Madhkour Al-Ghamdi (Arabic: سعيد مذكور الغامدي; born 18 January 1942) commonly known as Saeed Ghorab, is a Saudi Arabian former professional footballer who played as a striker for Al-Ittihad, Al-Ahli, Al-Nassr, and the Saudi Arabia national team.

== Early life ==
Ghorab was born on 18 January 1942, in the village of Al-Dhafir in the Al-Bahah region, around the slopes of the Hijaz Mountains in western Saudi Arabia. He then moved to Jeddah at an early age.

== Club career ==
Ghorab began his football career with the youth team of Al-Ahli. He later joined Al-Ittihad, before moving briefly to Al-Nassr due to his job with the Ministry of Defense and Aviation. During his time at Al-Nassr, Ghorab made a remarkable achievement by scoring eight goals in a single match achieved against Al-Najma during a cup competition in 1969. He eventually returned to Al-Ahli, but later had his last stint with Al-Ittihad, Where he remained until his retirement from football.

== International career ==
Ghorab played for the Saudi Arabia national football team from 1967 till 1974. In March 1967, he played in a test series against Pakistan where he scored several times. In December 1967, he scored the opening goal in Saudi Arabia’s 4–0 win over Tunisia in Riyadh. Ghorab played in three editions of the Gulf Cup including the 1970, 1972, and 1974. In the 1972 edition held in Saudi Arabia he became the tournament’s top scorer with five goals, including a hat-trick against the UAE, the first hat-trick ever recorded in the Gulf Cup. He scored three goals in the 1974 edition, scoring against Bahrain, UAE, and Qatar.

== Post-retirement ==
After retiring from football, Ghorab pursued a coaching career by enrolling in a Brazilian Football Academy in Rio de Janeiro, where he earned an advanced diploma in coaching. Upon returning to Saudi Arabia, he became actively involved in developing local talent. He began working as a coach and supervisor, including overseeing at the Al-Ittihad. He also served as assistant coach for Al-Ittihad’s youth team and took charge of the junior team in 1984.

In 1985, Ghorab was appointed assistant coach of Al-Ittihad, while also managing the youth squad that same year. His coaching career extended beyond club football, He led the King Abdulaziz University team in Jeddah in 1987, and in 1989, he became head coach of Al-Rabee Club’s first team. Three years later, he took on the responsibility of coaching both the youth and junior teams Al-Hazem, continuing his dedication to nurturing young footballers.
