= 2nd Arabian Gulf Cup =

International football tournament in 1972

1972 Arabian Gulf Cup
دورة كأس الخليج العربي الثانية (in Arabic)

Tournament details
- Host country: Saudi Arabia
- Dates: 16–28 March
- Teams: 4
- Venue: 1 (in 1 host city)

Final positions
- Champions: Kuwait (2nd title)
- Runners-up: Saudi Arabia
- Third place: United Arab Emirates
- Fourth place: Qatar

Tournament statistics
- Matches played: 6
- Goals scored: 25 (4.17 per match)
- Top scorer: (Saudi Arabia) Saeed Ghorab (5 goals)
- Best player: (Kuwait) Farouq Ibrahim
- Best goalkeeper: (Saudi Arabia) Ahmed Eid Al-Harbi

The 2nd Arabian Gulf Cup (Arabic: دورة كأس الخليج العربي الثانية) was the second edition of the Arabian Gulf Cup. The tournament was held in Riyadh, Saudi Arabia and was won by defending champions Kuwait for the second time. The tournament took place between 16 and 28 March 1972. Kuwait won their second consecutive title, edging out Saudi Arabia on goal difference after both nations finished with equal points. This was the first instance of the title being decided by goal difference.

United Arab Emirates made their debut in the competition and finished third. Bahrain withdrew after walking off the field, during the final match of the tournament, against Saudi Arabia to protest the officiating. They were subsequently ejected from the competition and their results were expunged.

== Teams ==
| Team | Previous appearances in tournament (Note: Bold indicates champion for that year.) |
|---|---|
| Bahrain | 1 (1970) |
| Kuwait | 1 (**1970**) |
| Qatar | 1 (1970) |
| Saudi Arabia (host) | 1 (1970) |
| United Arab Emirates | 0 (debut) |

== Venues ==
| 2nd Arabian Gulf Cup is located in Saudi Arabia | Riyadh |
|---|---|
| 2nd Arabian Gulf Cup is located in Saudi Arabia | Youth Welfare Stadium in Al-Malaz |
| 2nd Arabian Gulf Cup is located in Saudi Arabia | Capacity: **27,000** |

== Match officials ==
| Country | Referee |
|---|---|
| Bahrain | Ibrahim Al-Doy |
| Egypt | Mohamed Diab Al-Attar |
| Kuwait | Jaber Al-Jalahemah |
| Saudi Arabia | Abdulrahman Al-Daham |
| Sudan | Abdeen Ibrahim |

== Tournament ==
The four teams in the tournament played a single round-robin style competition. The team achieving first place in the overall standings was the tournament winner.

All times are local, AST (UTC+3).

| Team | Pld | W | D | L | GF | GA | GD | Pts |
|---|---|---|---|---|---|---|---|---|
| Kuwait | 3 | 2 | 1 | 0 | 14 | 2 | +12 | **5** |
| Saudi Arabia | 3 | 2 | 1 | 0 | 10 | 2 | +8 | **5** |
| United Arab Emirates | 3 | 1 | 0 | 2 | 1 | 11 | –10 | **2** |
| Qatar | 3 | 0 | 0 | 3 | 0 | 10 | –10 | **0** |
| Bahrain (Note: Bahrain were ejected from the competition and their record was expunged after abandoning their match against Saudi Arabia to protest the officiating.) | 0 | 0 | 0 | 0 | 0 | 0 | 0 | **0** |

=== Matches ===
16 March 1972
16:00

| Kuwait | 2–2 | Saudi Arabia |
|---|---|---|
| Yaqoub 15'; Al-Mula 30' | Report | Al-Mughnem 33'; Mousa 70' |

Youth Welfare Stadium in Al-Malaz, Riyadh
Referee: Mohamed Diab Al-Attar (Egypt)
17 March 1972
16:00

| United Arab Emirates | 1–0 | Qatar |
|---|---|---|
| Al-Sawad 22' | Report |

Youth Welfare Stadium in Al-Malaz, Riyadh
Referee: Jaber Al-Jalahemah (Kuwait)

18 March 1972
16:00

| Kuwait | Annulled 2–0 | Bahrain |
|---|---|---|
| Ibrahim, | Report |

Youth Welfare Stadium in Al-Malaz, Riyadh
Referee: Abdulrahman Al-Daham (Saudi Arabia)
19 March 1972
16:00

| United Arab Emirates | 0–4 | Saudi Arabia |
|---|---|---|
| | Report | Al-Mughnem 1'; Ghorab 9', 23', 42' |

Youth Welfare Stadium in Al-Malaz, Riyadh
Referee: Jaber Al-Jalahemah (Kuwait)

21 March 1972
16:00

| Bahrain | Annulled 6–2 | Qatar |
|---|---|---|
| Zuleikh,, Jaknam; Ali; Hamad | Report | Waleed; Awad |

Youth Welfare Stadium in Al-Malaz, Riyadh
Referee: Jaber Al-Jalahemah (Kuwait)
22 March 1972
16:00

| Kuwait | 7–0 | United Arab Emirates |
|---|---|---|
| Al-Mula 12', 56'; Yaqoub 39', 78'; Bouhamad 18', 26'; Al-Abdullah 67' | Report |

Youth Welfare Stadium in Al-Malaz, Riyadh
Referee: Ibrahim Al-Doy (Bahrain)

23 March 1972
16:00

| Saudi Arabia | 4–0 | Qatar |
|---|---|---|
| Ghorab 2', 60'; Mousa 39', 73' (pen.) | Report |

Youth Welfare Stadium in Al-Malaz, Riyadh
Referee: Mohamed Diab Al-Attar (Egypt)
24 March 1972
16:00

| Bahrain | Annulled 2–0 | United Arab Emirates |
|---|---|---|
| Jaknam 63'; Hamad 75' | Report |

Youth Welfare Stadium in Al-Malaz, Riyadh
Referee: Abdulrahman Al-Daham (Saudi Arabia)

26 March 1972
16:00

| Qatar | 0–5 | Kuwait |
|---|---|---|
| | Report | Al-Kaabi 8' (o.g.); Al-Mulla 15'; Bouhamad 33', 68'; Shoaib 82' |

Youth Welfare Stadium in Al-Malaz, Riyadh
Referee: Ibrahim Al-Doy (Bahrain)
28 March 1972
16:00

| Saudi Arabia | Annulled 2–1 | Bahrain |
|---|---|---|
| Ghorab 50', 54' (pen.) | Report | Ali 39' |

Youth Welfare Stadium in Al-Malaz, Riyadh
Referee: Abdeen Ibrahim (Sudan)

Note: The match was abandoned after 60 minutes after Bahrain walked off the field to protest the officiating. Bahrain were subsequently ejected from the competition and their record was expunged.

=== Result ===
2nd Arabian Gulf Cup winners

**Kuwait**
**Second title**

== Statistics ==
=== Goalscorers ===
There were 25 goals scored in 6 matches, for an average of 4.17 goals per match.

5 goals

- (Saudi Arabia) Saeed Ghorab

3 goals

- (Kuwait) Ali Al-Mula
- (Kuwait) Hamad Bouhamad
- (Kuwait) Jasem Yaqoub
- (Saudi Arabia) Alnoor Mousa

2 goals

- (Kuwait) Mohammed Shoaib
- (Saudi Arabia) Mohammed Al-Mughnem

1 goal

- (Kuwait) Saleh Al-Arifi
- (Kuwait) Kareem Nassar
- (United Arab Emirates) Suhail Salem

1 own goal

- (Qatar) Eissa Al-Kaabi (against Kuwait)

=== Awards ===
Player of the Tournament

- (Kuwait) Farouq Ibrahim

Top Scorer

- (Saudi Arabia) Saeed Ghorab (5 goals)

Goalkeeper of the Tournament

- (Saudi Arabia) Ahmed Eid Al-Harbi
