= Kuwait national football team =

National association football team

Kuwait
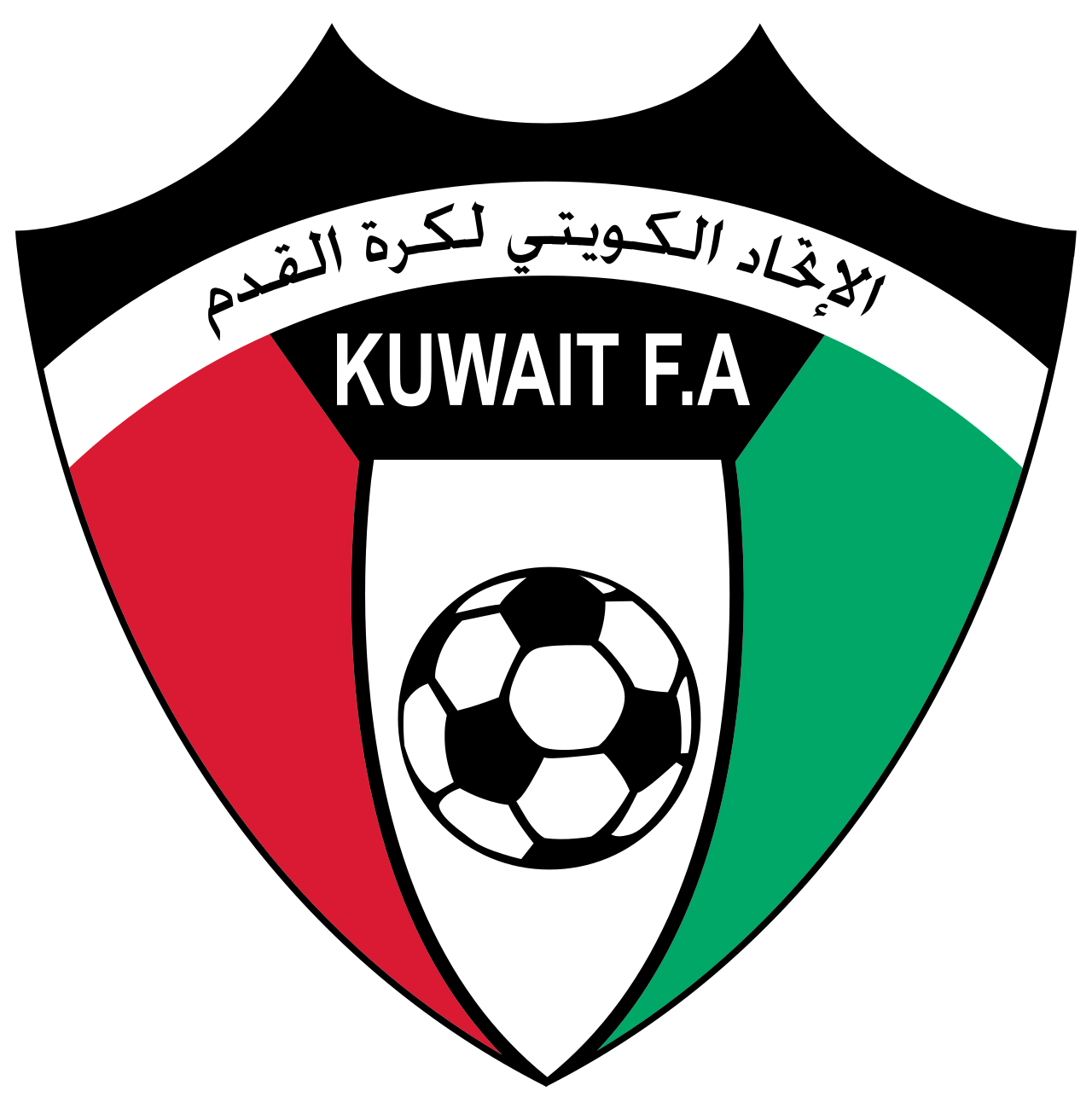
- Nickname(s): الأزرق, al-Azraq (The Blues)
- Association: Kuwait Football Association (KFA)
- Confederation: AFC (Asia)
- Sub-confederation: WAFF (West Asia)
- Head coach: Hélio Sousa
- Captain: Khaled Al-Rashidi
- Most caps: Bader Al-Mutawa (202)
- Top scorer: Bashar Abdullah (75)
- Home stadium: Jaber Al-Ahmad International Stadium
- FIFA code: KUW
First colours	Second colours

FIFA ranking
- Current: 134 ▼1 (7 October 2026)
- Highest: 24 (December 1998)
- Lowest: 189 (December 2017)

First international
- Kuwait 2–2 Libya (Morocco; 3 September 1961)

Biggest win
- Kuwait 20–0 Bhutan (Kuwait City, Kuwait; 14 February 2000)

Biggest defeat
- United Arab Republic 8–0 Kuwait (Morocco; 4 September 1961); Portugal 8–0 Kuwait (Leiria, Portugal; 19 November 2003)

World Cup
- Appearances: 1 (first in 1982)
- Best result: Group stage (1982)

Asian Cup
- Appearances: 11 (first in 1972)
- Best result: Champions (1980)

Arab Cup
- Appearances: 9 (first in 1963)
- Best result: Third place (1992, 1998)

Arabian Gulf Cup
- Appearances: 27 (first in 1970)
- Best result: Champions (1970, 1972, 1974, 1976, 1982, 1986, 1990, 1996, 1998, 2010)

WAFF Championship
- Appearances: 5 (first in 2010)
- Best result: Champions (2010)
- Website: kuwait-fa.org/en/

The Kuwait national football team (Arabic: منتخب الكويت لكرة القدم, romanized: muntakhab alkuayt likurat alqadam) represents Kuwait in international football and it is controlled by the Kuwait Football Association. Kuwait made its only FIFA World Cup appearance in 1982 and managed to get one draw in the group stage against Czechoslovakia. In the AFC Asian Cup, Kuwait reached the final in 1976 and won the tournament four years later in 1980.

The Kuwait national football team has faced multiple suspensions by FIFA due to governmental interference and failure to comply with regulations, notably in 2007, 2008, and 2015. These suspensions, which were later lifted after legal reforms, caused the team to miss major tournaments, including the 2018 FIFA World Cup and 2019 AFC Asian Cup qualifiers, and led to a significant drop in the country's FIFA World Rankings. In 2017, following the lifting of its suspension, Kuwait hosted the Gulf Cup.

== History ==
=== Early successes ===
Kuwait's first international match at the 1961 Arab Games against Libya ended in a 2–2 draw. Their main losses were 8–0 defeats to both the United Arab Republic and Portugal. Kuwait hosted the 1974 Arabian Gulf Cup at the Al Kuwait Sports Club Stadium, collecting their third consecutive title in the cup. They won the AFC Asian Cup in 1980. Kuwait's national football team joined the World Cup in 1982, which was held in Spain. Kuwait was placed in Group 4 where it lost against England and France and managed a draw against Czechoslovakia. Kuwait's highest-ever FIFA ranking was 24th place, achieved in December 1998.

Bader Al-Mutawa is Kuwait's most capped player ever, and Bashar Abdullah is the all-time top scorer. Kuwait has won the Arabian Gulf Cup ten times and is the most successful team in winning the competition. Kuwait's most successful manager was Luiz Felipe Scolari, who had previously won the FIFA World Cup with Brazil. Scolari led Kuwait to win the 1990 Arabian Gulf Cup, beating Qatar in the final. He was then forced to leave the country after the 1990 invasion by Iraq.

Kuwait's largest victory was a 20–0 win against Bhutan on 14 February 2000. At the time, it was the highest margin of victory in international football until Australia defeated American Samoa 31–0 on 11 April 2001.

=== Impact of the Iraqi Invasion ===
The Iraqi invasion of Kuwait in August 1990 significantly affected the Kuwaiti national football team. During the occupation, sports activities were severely disrupted as many athletes, including football players, were displaced or went into exile. The Kuwait Football Association's headquarters and facilities were damaged, leading to the suspension of all football competitions in the country. Consequently, the national team had to miss the 1992 AFC Asian Cup qualifiers.

One of the most tragic incidents during the Iraqi invasion of Kuwait was the death of Sheikh Fahad Al-Ahmed Al-Jaber Al-Sabah, who was killed defending the palace. on 2 August 1990. He was a prominent figure in Kuwaiti sports, serving as President of the Kuwait Football Association (1978–1990) and a member of the International Olympic Committee (1981–1990). Under his leadership, Kuwait won the 1980 AFC Asian Cup and qualified for the 1982 FIFA World Cup, becoming the first Asian Arab nation to do so. His death was a severe loss to Kuwaiti sports, and his legacy is honored through various tournaments and stadiums named after him.

Despite these challenges, the Kuwaiti national football team participated in the 1990 Asian Games held in Beijing, China, from 23 September to 6 October 1990. The participation was organized by the exiled Kuwaiti Olympic Committee, operating from Saudi Arabia, and involved athletes who were already abroad during the invasion. According to a report by the Los Angeles Times dated 17 September 1990, 42 Kuwaiti athletes, including 23 football players, arrived in Beijing to represent Kuwait in the tournament.

Kuwait was placed in Group C alongside Thailand, Yemen, and Hong Kong. The team finished seventh overall, with one win, one draw, and two losses, scoring three goals and conceding four.

==== Group C ====
Pos	Team	Pld	W	D	L	GF	GA	GD	Pts
1	Thailand	3	2	1	0	4	1	+3	5
2	Kuwait	3	1	1	1	3	3	0	3
3	Hong Kong	3	1	0	2	3	4	−1	2
4	Yemen	3	0	2	1	0	2	−2	2

Source: RSSSF

Kuwait's participation in the 1990 Asian Games came just weeks after the Iraqi invasion, with athletes competing under exceptional circumstances and limited resources, marking one of the most challenging moments in the nation's sporting history.

Kuwait's football league, the Kuwaiti Premier League, was also suspended, leading to a significant loss of competitive match experience for players. Many training facilities and stadiums were either damaged or repurposed for military use during the invasion, further hampering the team's preparations and development. Additionally, financial constraints post-invasion led to reduced funding for sports, affecting the quality of training and support available to athletes.

In the years that followed these challenges, the team achieved steady and measurable progress. In 1996, Kuwait won the Arabian Gulf Cup, showcasing its resilience and ability to recover from the invasion's setbacks. The national team also qualified for the 1996 AFC Asian Cup, advancing to the semi-final, which was a significant achievement given the circumstances. The invasion's long-term effects were felt across the sporting community, highlighting the resilience and determination of Kuwaiti athletes and officials in rebuilding their footballing legacy post-occupation.

=== Suspensions ===
On 30 October 2007, Kuwait was suspended by FIFA from all participation in international football on the grounds of governmental interference in the national football association. However, the ban was short-lived, lasting less than 2 weeks. On 24 October 2008, Kuwait was again suspended by FIFA from all participation in international football for failing to hold the General Assembly elections by mid-October. FIFA provisionally lifted its suspension on the Kuwait Football Association (KFA) on 22 December 2008.

Once again on 16 October 2015, Kuwait was suspended for the third time as FIFA did not recognize the new sports law in the country. Kuwait tried to get the suspension lifted at the 66th FIFA Congress, but the proposal was rejected. Therefore, to the earlier announcement on 27 April 2016, the hosting of the Gulf Cup tournament would also be moved to Qatar. The suspension was lifted on 6 December 2017, after Kuwait adopted a new sports law. By this time, the team had fallen from 139th place to 189th place in the FIFA World Rankings due to its inactivity, which also caused the team to miss the qualifiers for the 2018 FIFA World Cup and the 2019 AFC Asian Cup.

On 7 December 2017, it was announced that Kuwait would host the 2017 Gulf Cup tournament after Saudi Arabia, the United Arab Emirates, and Bahrain had all withdrawn. The tournament was previously set to be hosted by Qatar, but, because of the Qatari diplomatic crisis, it was moved to Kuwait, and the withdrawn nations joined again.

=== Revival ===
During the 2022 FIFA World Cup qualification, Kuwait, which only started to rebuild its team following years of suspensions, was drawn into Group B alongside Australia, Jordan, Nepal, and Chinese Taipei. Kuwait's performance in the qualifiers reflected the impact of previous suspensions and instabilities, as the team lost 0–3 twice. Still, the qualifiers stood out as the best qualification for Kuwait since 2006, as Kuwait finished second and was unable to progress to the third round.

In June 2022, Kuwait hosted the third round of the 2023 AFC Asian Cup qualifiers. Kuwait failed to qualify, as they lost to Indonesia and Jordan.

In June 2023, Kuwait was invited as a guest team in the 2023 SAFF Championship, where it finished as runner-up, losing to India during a penalty shootout in the final.

In June 2024, Kuwait qualified for the 2027 AFC Asian Cup after nine years of absence and advanced into the third round of the 2026 FIFA World Cup qualification.

After the controversial match against Iraq, which ended in a goalless draw, the Kuwait Football Association board resigned on 17 September 2024 due to chaotic scenes where fans suffered in extreme temperatures and some ticket holders were denied entry. The Kuwaiti FA launched an inquiry and subsequently approved the resignations of several key officials. Following the backlash, the KFA suspended its Secretary-General, Salah Al-Qanai, and Public Relations Director, Mohamed Bou Abbas. Dr. Saleh Al-Majroub was later appointed as acting Secretary-General to lead the federation during the interim period.

Following that match, Kuwait entered a period of fluctuating results. On 10 October 2024, they suffered a heavy 0–4 defeat to Oman in Muscat, followed by a 2–2 draw against Palestine in Doha on 15 October. The team then hosted South Korea on 14 November and lost 1–3, before securing a 1–1 draw with Jordan on 19 November in Kuwait City. In December, Kuwait played three friendlies in Doha: a 1–1 draw with Yemen on the 9th, and two consecutive defeats to Lebanon on the 12th and 15th (1–2 and 0–2 respectively).

During the 26th Arabian Gulf Cup hosted in Kuwait from 21 to 31 December 2024, the national team aimed to revive its historical status as the tournament's most successful side with ten titles. The competition began with a 1–1 draw against Oman, followed by an impressive 2–1 victory over the United Arab Emirates. In their final group stage match, Kuwait drew 1–1 with Qatar, securing qualification to the semi-finals as group runners-up. The semi-final match against Bahrain was a closely contested encounter. Despite creating several chances, Kuwait lost 0–1, ending their hopes of winning an eleventh title on home soil.

The tournament marked Kuwait's return as a competitive force in the region, with solid performances that drew positive attention from local media. Sports analysts and newspapers such as Al Rai and Al Qabas praised the team's fighting spirit and improved organization under interim leadership, despite not reaching the final. There was also renewed public enthusiasm, with several matches drawing near-capacity crowds at Jaber Al-Ahmad International Stadium. However, some criticism remained regarding the team's lack of clinical finishing, and calls were made for continued reforms in youth development and coaching infrastructure.

In 2025, the Kuwait national football team continued to experience inconsistent performances. On 20 March, Kuwait played against Iraq in Basra, where the match ended in a 2–2 draw. Yousef Nasser scored both goals for Kuwait, while Iraq managed to equalize with two late goals in stoppage time through Akam Hashim and Ibrahim Bayesh.

Five days later, on 25 March, Kuwait hosted Oman at Jaber Al-Ahmad International Stadium but suffered a narrow 0–1 defeat, with Issam Al-Subhi scoring the decisive goal for Oman. After that match, Kuwait's qualifiers ended with a 2-0 and 4–0 defeat to Palestine at home and South Korea away respectively.

In November 2025, Kuwait defeated Mauritania in the 2025 FIFA Arab Cup Qualifiers and Qualified to the Finals of the 2025 FIFA Arab Cup, the first time since the 2012 Arab Cup.

== Team image ==
=== Kit and emblem ===
The Kuwait national football team is recognized for its blue kits while playing at home, symbolizing the nation's maritime heritage and the blue of the Arabian Gulf. The team's emblem features a falcon, a national symbol of Kuwait. Adidas is acting as Kuwait's official kit provider since 2023.

Period	Kit Provider
1981–1983	(Germany) Puma
1984–1986	(France) Le Coq Sportif
1986–1989	(Germany) Adidas
1990–1991	(Italy) Lotto
1992–1993	(Thailand) Grand Sport
1994–1995	(Germany) Adidas
1996	(Italy) Erreà
1997	(Italy) Kappa
1998–1999	(Thailand) Grand Sport
2000	(Bahrain) Baraka
2001–2002	(United Kingdom) Umbro
2003–2005	(Germany) Saller
2006–2007	(Thailand) Grand Sport
2008	(Germany) Adidas
2009–2011	(Switzerland) Burrda
2012	(Italy) Zeus
2013–2014	(Italy) Kappa
2015–2016	(Germany) Uhlsport
2017–2022	(Italy) Erreà
2023–present	(Germany) Adidas

=== Stadium ===
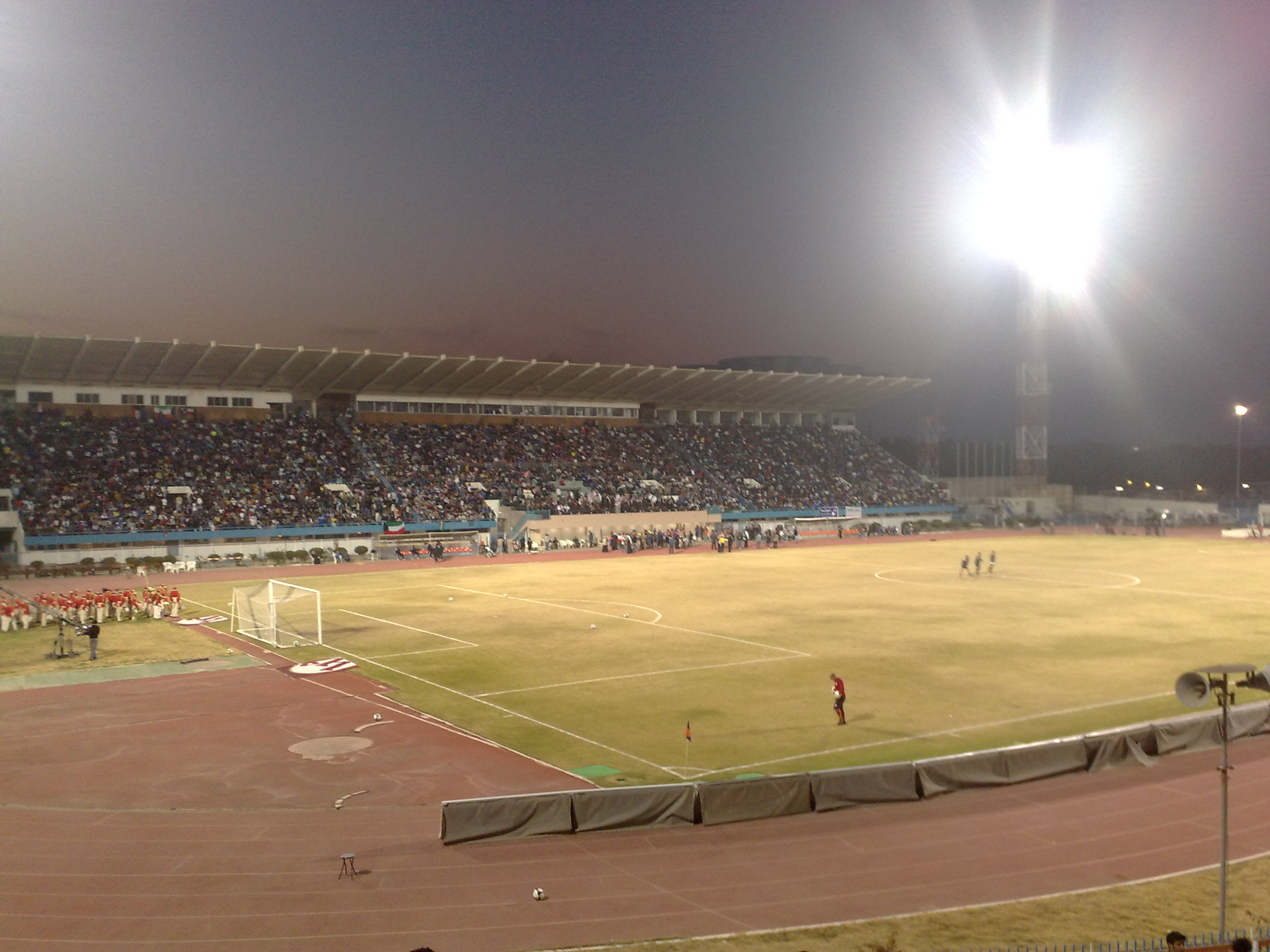
Al-Sadaqua Walsalam Stadium

The Kuwait national football team primarily plays its home matches at the Jaber Al-Ahmad International Stadium, a modern multi-purpose venue inaugurated in 2009 with a capacity of over 60,000 spectators. This stadium has hosted major international fixtures, including Gulf Cup matches and Asian qualifiers.

Before its completion, the national team played most of its home matches at Mohammed Al-Hamad Stadium in Hawalli, a smaller venue traditionally associated with Al-Qadsia SC. Kuwait has also used other stadiums on occasion, such as Al-Sadaqua Walsalam Stadium, home of Kazma SC, and Ali Al-Salem Al-Sabah Stadium, home of Al-Nasr SC in Farwaniya. These alternative venues are typically selected based on logistical needs or specific tournament requirements.

In recent years, the newly inaugurated Sulaibikhat Stadium in Sulaibikhat, has been added to Kuwait's list of modern football venues. Opened in December 2024, it features a European-style football-specific design without an athletics track and has a capacity of 15,000 spectators. It serves as the home ground for Sulaibikhat SC and has also hosted select matches for Al-Arabi SC.

=== Broadcasting ===
Kuwait national football team matches are primarily broadcast on Kuwait TV Sport, which provides full match commentary. During major tournaments such as the Arabian Gulf Cup and the AFC Asian Cup, matches are additionally broadcast on beIN Sports and Dubai Sports.

== Rivalries ==
Kuwait vs. Iraq

- Iraq

Statistics vs. Iraq
Played^{1}	Wins^{2}	Draws	Losses	GF	GA
37	8	11	17	36	50

1. Only matches recognized by FIFA.
2. Wins for Kuwait.

Iraq's rivalry with Kuwait has been one of the most notable football rivalries in the Arab world. The rivalry began in the mid-1970s, and it was the decade from 1976 until 1986 that saw the golden age of football for arguably the finest teams the region has produced. Both nations imposed their domination on the Gulf region, and from the Gulf Cup's inception in 1970 until 1990, the tournament was won by only two teams; Kuwait seven times (1970, 1972, 1974, 1976, 1982, 1986, 1990), and despite Iraq's absence in the first three editions and withdrawal in two others, Iraq won it three times (1979, 1984, 1988).

On 11 June 1976, the two met in the semi-final of the Asian Cup in Tehran; Kuwait took the lead twice, and Iraq equalized twice thereafter. Finally, in the 10th minute of extra time, Kamel scored the winner for Kuwait. In 1979, the year Iraq clinched their first Gulf Cup and won over Kuwait 3–1, the two met in a qualifier for the Moscow 1980 Olympic Games, both managed to qualify for the Olympic Games, and both made it to the quarterfinals in Moscow. Iraq also qualified for the 1984 Games in Los Angeles and the 1988 Games in Seoul. The 1982 Asian Games was won as well. Kuwait won the 1980 AFC Asian Cup, which they hosted. The nations also left their mark on the world stage. Kuwait qualified for the 1982 World Cup finals in Spain. Iraq matched that in Mexico 1986.

As Iraq and Kuwait traded Gulf titles in 1988 and 1990, few could have imagined their rivalry on the football field being replaced by an altogether more catastrophic one on the battlefield. Because of the Gulf War, Iraq and Kuwait were in complete avoidance and never met for more than a decade. Kuwait's Blues had a relative recovery, winning the Gulf Cup in 1996 and 1998, before securing their record 10th title in 2010. Iraq won the 2007 Asian Cup.

Kuwait vs. Saudi Arabia

- Saudi Arabia

Statistics vs. Saudi Arabia
Played^{1}	Wins^{2}	Draws	Losses	GF	GA
42	15	13	15	44	44

1. Only matches recognized by FIFA.
2. Wins for Kuwait.

The football rivalry between Kuwait and Saudi Arabia is one of the most anticipated in the Gulf region, steeped in decades of competition and regional pride. This rivalry is frequently highlighted in the Arabian Gulf Cup and other regional tournaments, attracting attention from fans and media. Kuwait achieved notable success in the 1970s and 1980s, winning the 1980 AFC Asian Cup and becoming the first Arab nation to qualify for the FIFA World Cup in 1982. Key players from this golden era, such as Jassem Yaqoub, Faisal Al-Dakhil, and Saad Al-Houti, were instrumental in Kuwait's regional and continental triumphs.

Saudi Arabia saw increased success in football beginning in the late 1980s and continuing into the 1990s, with consecutive FIFA World Cup qualifications starting in 1994 and three AFC Asian Cup victories in 1984, 1988, and 1996. Legendary players like Majed Abdullah, who is often regarded as one of the greatest Asian footballers of all time, and Sami Al-Jaber, a prolific striker with four FIFA World Cup appearances, played crucial roles in Saudi Arabia's footballing achievements.

Notable matches in this rivalry include the 1980 Arabian Gulf Cup final, where Kuwait defeated Saudi Arabia 3–1, showcasing their dominance at the time. Another significant encounter was the 1998 Arabian Gulf Cup, where Saudi Arabia emerged victorious, asserting their growing influence in regional football. The 2002 FIFA World Cup qualifiers also featured a dramatic showdown between the two teams, with Saudi Arabia securing a crucial 1–0 victory, thanks to a goal by Nawaf Al-Temyat, which helped them qualify for the World Cup.

== Results and fixtures ==
The following is a list of match results in the last 12 months as well as future matches that have been scheduled.

Win Draw Loss Fixture

=== 2025 ===
25 November 2025 FIFA Arab Cup qualification	Mauritania	0–2	Kuwait	Al-Rayyan, Qatar
16:00 UTC+3		Report	Daham 8'; Daham 24'	Stadium: Jassim Bin Hamad Stadium; Referee: Ma Ning (China)

2 December 2025 FIFA Arab Cup	Egypt	1–1	Kuwait	Lusail, Qatar
17:30 UTC+3	Afsha 88' (pen.)	Report	Al Hajeri 64'	Stadium: Lusail Stadium; Attendance: 24,632; Referee: Espen Eskås (Norway)

6 December 2025 FIFA Arab Cup	Kuwait	1–3	Jordan	Al Rayyan, Qatar
14:00 UTC+3	Nasser 84'	Report	Abu Taha 17'; Al-Rosan 49'; Olwan 90+7' (pen.)	Stadium: Ahmad bin Ali Stadium; Attendance: 35,933; Referee: Cristián Garay (Chile)

9 December 2025 FIFA Arab Cup	United Arab Emirates	3–1	Kuwait	Doha, Qatar
17:30 UTC+3	Al Ghassani 16' (pen.), 18'; Giménez 66'	Report	Al Hajeri 59'	Stadium: Stadium 974; Attendance: 15,357; Referee: Ma Ning (China)

=== 2026 ===
5 June Friendly	Thailand	2–2	Kuwait	Pathum Thani, Thailand
19:30 UTC+7			Yousef Majed 48'; Eid Al-Rashidi 68'	Stadium: True BG Stadium; Attendance: 5,437

18 September Friendly	Kuwait	1–2	Yemen	Jeddah, Saudi Arabia
19:30 UTC+3	Al-Enezi	Report	Al-Dahi; Ahmed Maher	Stadium: TBD

23 September 27th Arabian Gulf Cup	Saudi Arabia	1–0	Kuwait	Jeddah, Saudi Arabia
--:-- UTC+3	Al Haqan 73' (o.g.)	Report		Stadium: King Abdullah Sports City Stadium; Referee: João Pinheiro (Portugal)

26 September 27th Arabian Gulf Cup	Kuwait	2–3	Iraq	Jeddah, Saudi Arabia
--:-- UTC+3				Stadium: Prince Abdullah Al-Faisal Sports City Stadium

29 September 27th Arabian Gulf Cup	Oman	3–1	Kuwait	Jeddah, Saudi Arabia
--:-- UTC+3	Al-Rawahi 65', 81'; Al-Shaqsy 84'	Report	Al-Khaldi 6'	Stadium: Prince Abdullah Al-Faisal Sports City Stadium; Attendance: 1,184; Referee: Mohammed Ahmed Al-Shammari (Qatar)

13 November Friendly	Kuwait	3–0	Syria	Kuwait City, Kuwait
19:30 UTC+3				Stadium: Al-Sadaqua Walsalam Stadium

17 November Friendly	Kuwait	0–2	Honduras	Kuwait City, Kuwait
19:30 UTC+3				Stadium: Al-Sadaqua Walsalam Stadium

=== 2027 ===
March Friendly	Kuwait	v	TBD
--:--			Stadium: TBD

March Friendly	Kuwait	v	TBD
--:--			Stadium: TBD

=== 2028 ===
January 2027 Asian Cup Group A	Saudi Arabia	v	Kuwait	Jeddah, Saudi Arabia
--:--				Stadium: King Abdullah Sports City Stadium

== Coaching staff ==
Name	Role
Head coach	(Portugal) Hélio Sousa
Assistant coach	(Portugal) José Carneiro (Bahrain) Ahmed Isa Al-Ameri
Goalkeeper coach	(Portugal) Pedro Roma
Fitness coach	(Portugal) José Herculano
Match analyst	(Kuwait) Hussain Al-Dosary
Team Doctor	(Kuwait) Khaled Saad
Physiotherapist	(Kuwait) Fawaz Al-Rashdi
Masseur	(Kuwait) Mohammed Saleh Askar
Team manager	(Kuwait) Ahmed Saad
Technical director	(Portugal) Diogo Rebelo

=== Coaching history ===
- (Egypt) Ali Othman and Majid Mohammed (1955)
- (Egypt) Ahmed Abu Taha (1957)
- (Poland) Edmund Majowski (1957–1958)
- (Socialist Federal Republic of Yugoslavia) Ljubiša Broćić (1962, 1971–1973, 1973–1975)
- (United Arab Republic) Saleh El Wahsh (1964)
- (Hungary) Gyula Grosics (1966)
- (Socialist Federal Republic of Yugoslavia) Dimitri Tadić (1966–1969)
- (United Arab Republic) Taha El-Doukhi (1970)
- (Kuwait) Hassan Nasser (1973)
- (Brazil) Mário Zagallo (1976–1978)
- (Kuwait) Saleh Zakaria (1978, 1986, 2006–2007)
- (Brazil) Carlos Alberto Parreira (1978–1982)
- (Brazil) Antônio Lopes (1983–1985)
- (England) Malcolm Allison (1985–1986)
- (Hungary) György Mezey (1986–1987)
- (Brazil) Antônio Vieira (1987–1988)
- (England) George Armstrong (1988)
- (Brazil) Otacílio Gonçalves (1989–1990)
- (Brazil) Luiz Felipe Scolari (1990)
- (Kuwait) Mohammed Karam (1990)
- (Brazil) Valmir Louruz (1990–1992)
- (Brazil) Paulo Campos (1992–1993)
- (Brazil) Gildo Rodrigues (1993)
- (Ukraine) Valeriy Lobanovskyi (1993–1996)
- (Czech Republic) Milan Máčala (1996–1999)
- (Czech Republic) Dušan Uhrin (1999–2001)
- (Germany) Berti Vogts (2001–2002)
- (Serbia and Montenegro) Radojko Avramović (2002, 2018)
- (Brazil) Paulo César Carpegiani (2003–2004)
- (Kuwait) Mohammed Ebrahim Hajeyah (2004, 2005, 2008–2009)
- (Serbia and Montenegro) Slobodan Pavković (2005)
- (Romania) Mihai Stoichiță (2005–2006)
- (Croatia) Rodion Gačanin (2007–2008)
- (Serbia) Goran Tufegdžić (2009–2013)
- (Brazil) Jorvan Vieira (2013–2014)
- (Tunisia) Nabil Maâloul (2014–2015)
- (Serbia) Boris Bunjak (2017)
- (Croatia) Romeo Jozak (2018–2019)
- (Kuwait) Thamer Enad (2019–2020, 2021)
- (Spain) Andres Carrasco (2020–2021)
- (Czech Republic) Vítězslav Lavička (2022)
- (Portugal) Rui Bento (2022–2024)
- (Argentina) Juan Antonio Pizzi (2024–2025)
- (Portugal) Hélio Sousa (2025–)

== Players ==
=== Current squad ===
The following 26 players have been called up for the friendly match against Thailand on 6 June 2026.
Caps and goals as of 6 June 2026, after the game against Thailand.

No.	Pos.	Player	Date of birth (age)	Caps	Goals	Club
	GK	Khaled Al-Rashidi	20 April 1987 (age 39)	49	0	(Kuwait Football Association) Al-Kuwait
	GK	Saud Al-Hoshan	18 March 2000 (age 26)	3	0	(Kuwait Football Association) Al-Kuwait
	GK	Abdulrahman Al-Fadhli	23 January 2001 (age 25)	1	0	(Kuwait Football Association) Al-Salmiya
	DF	Fahad Al-Hajeri	10 November 1991 (age 35)	106	8	(Kuwait Football Association) Al-Kuwait
	DF	Hassan Al-Enezi	1 September 2000 (age 26)	32	2	(Jordan Football Association) Al-Ahli
	DF	Rashed Al-Dousari	18 July 2000 (age 26)	28	0	(Kuwait Football Association) Al-Qadsia
	DF	Muath Al-Dhefiri	20 May 1997 (age 29)	15	0	(Kuwait Football Association) Al-Qadsia
	DF	Khaled Al-Fadhli	23 February 2002 (age 24)	13	0	(Kuwait Football Association) Al-Qadsia
	DF	Abdulwahab Al-Awadi	2 June 2002 (age 24)	7	0	(Kuwait Football Association) Al-Arabi
	DF	Mohammad Al-Sharifi	28 June 2004 (age 22)	4	1	(Kuwait Football Association) Al-Qadsia
	DF	Yousef Al-Haqan	5 February 2002 (age 24)	1	0	(Kuwait Football Association) Al-Qadsia
	MF	Redha Hani	22 April 1996 (age 30)	52	1	(Kuwait Football Association) Al-Kuwait
	MF	Fawaz Ayedh	21 February 1997 (age 29)	40	1	(Kuwait Football Association) Al-Salmiya
	MF	Athbi Shehab	14 October 1993 (age 33)	25	1	(Kuwait Football Association) Al-Qadsia
	MF	Muath Al-Enezi	16 July 2003 (age 23)	19	1	(Kuwait Football Association) Al-Salmiya
	MF	Nasser Faleh	12 April 1999 (age 27)	12	0	(Kuwait Football Association) Kazma
	MF	Khaled Al-Mershed	6 April 1999 (age 27)	5	0	(Kuwait Football Association) Al-Arabi
	MF	Jasem Al-Mutar	17 April 2006 (age 20)	5	0	(Kuwait Football Association) Al-Qadsia
	MF	Abdullah Al-Garzaie	18 September 2008 (age 18)	1	0	(Kuwait Football Association) Al-Arabi
	FW	Yousef Nasser	9 October 1990 (age 36)	131	58	(Kuwait Football Association) Al-Kuwait
	FW	Eid Al-Rashidi	25 May 1999 (age 27)	60	5	(Kuwait Football Association) Al-Qadsia
	FW	Shabaib Al-Khaldi	11 August 1998 (age 28)	45	18	(Kuwait Football Association) Kazma
	FW	Mohammad Daham	17 February 2000 (age 26)	38	11	(Kuwait Football Association) Al-Kuwait
	FW	Yousef Majed	14 January 2005 (age 21)	15	1	(Kuwait Football Association) Al-Arabi

=== Recent call-ups ===
The following players have also been called up to the Kuwait squad within the last twelve months.

Pos.	Player	Date of birth (age)	Caps	Goals	Club	Latest call-up
GK	Sulaiman Abdulghafour	26 February 1991 (age 35)	61	0	(Kuwait) Al-Arabi	2025 FIFA Arab Cup
DF	Nasser Khader	14 October 2003 (age 23)	3	0	(Kuwait) Al-Nasr	2025 FIFA Arab Cup
MF	Ahmed Al-Dhefiri	9 January 1992 (age 34)	82	5	Al-Kuwait	2025 FIFA Arab Cup
MF	Sultan Al-Enezi	29 September 1992 (age 34)	70	0	(Kuwait) Kazma	v. Egypt; 2 December 2025
MF	Athbi Shehab	14 October 1993 (age 33)	18	1	(Kuwait) Al-Qadsia	v. Mauritania; 25 November 2025
^{INJ} Withdrew due to injury.^{PRE} Preliminary squad.^{RET} Player has retired from international football.^{SUS} Suspended from the national team.

=== Previous squads ===
World Cup squads

- 1982 FIFA World Cup squad

Asian Cup squads

- 1972 AFC Asian Cup squad
- 1976 AFC Asian Cup squad
- 1980 AFC Asian Cup squad
- 1984 AFC Asian Cup squad
- 1988 AFC Asian Cup squad
- 1996 AFC Asian Cup squad
- 2000 AFC Asian Cup squad
- 2004 AFC Asian Cup squad
- 2011 AFC Asian Cup squad
- 2015 AFC Asian Cup squad

== Records ==
As of 5 June 2026
Players in bold are still active with Kuwait.

=== Most appearances ===
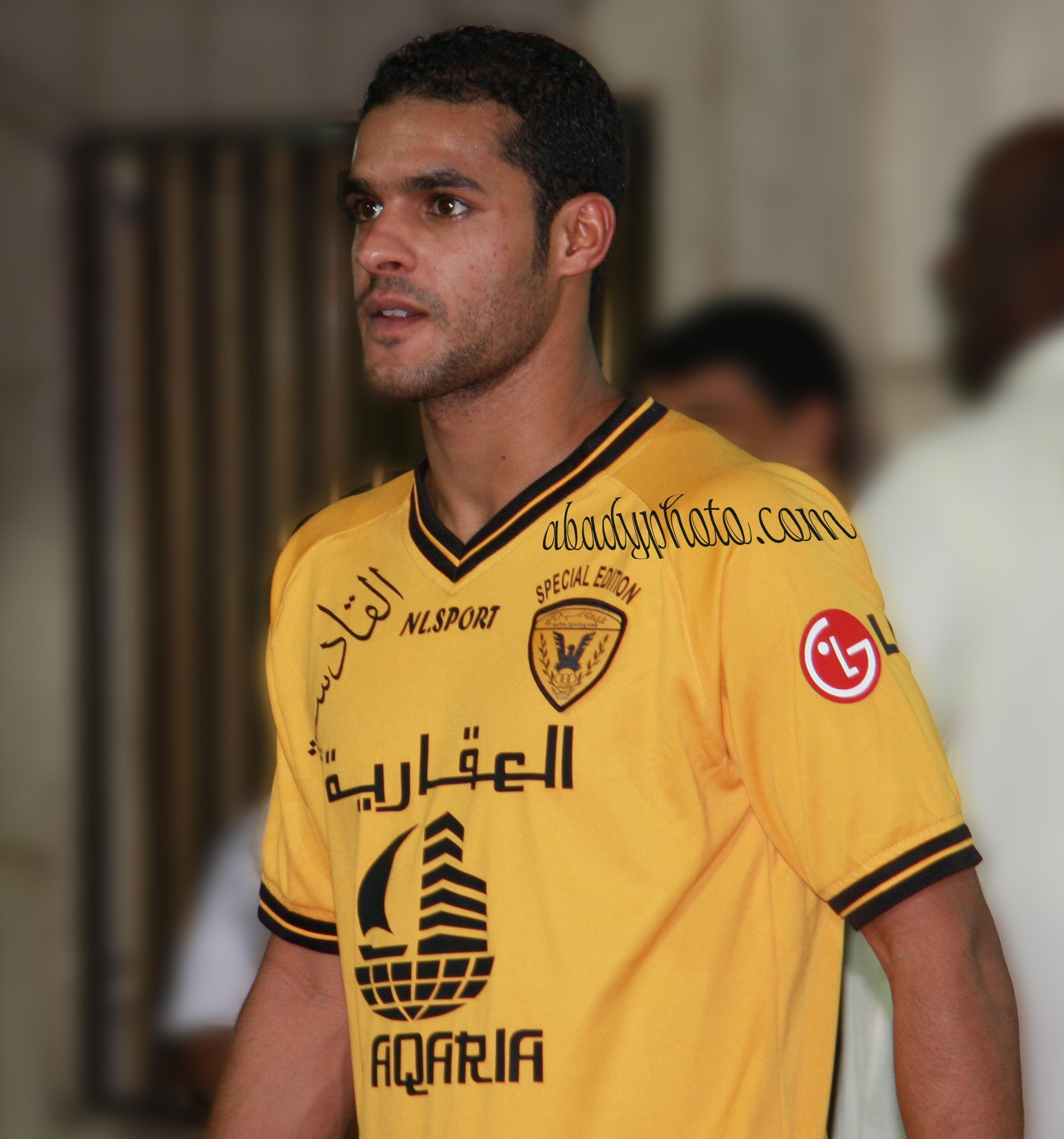
Bader Al-Mutawa is Kuwait's most capped player with 202 appearances.

Rank	Name	Caps	Goals	Career
1	Bader Al-Mutawa	202	56	2003–2022
2	Waleed Ali	136	8	2002–2014
3	Bashar Abdullah	134	75	1996–2007
4	**Yousef Nasser**	133	60	2009–present
5	Musaed Neda	125	20	2002–2015
6	Nawaf Al-Khaldi	115	0	2000–2014
7	Jarah Al Ateeqi	112	4	2001–2013
8	Nohair Al-Shammari	109	2	1996–2009
8	Wael Sulaiman	109	16	1986–1996
10	Jamal Mubarak	107	9	1994–2004

=== Top goalscorers ===
Rank	Name	Goals	Caps	Ratio	Career
1	Bashar Abdullah	75	134	0.56	1996–2007
2	Jassem Al Houwaidi	63	83	0.76	1992–2003
3	**Yousef Nasser**	60	133	0.45	2009–present
4	Bader Al-Mutawa	56	202	0.28	2003–2022
5	Faisal Al-Dakhil	46	97	0.47	1974–1988
6	Jasem Yaqoub	36	49	0.73	1972–1982
7	Faraj Laheeb	23	45	0.51	1998–2008
8	Yussef Al-Suwayed	21	61	0.34	1979–1990
9	Musaed Neda	20	125	0.16	2002–2015
10	**Shabaib Al-Khaldi**	18	45	0.4	2019–present

== Competitive record ==
=== FIFA World Cup ===
FIFA World Cup record									Qualification record					
Year	Round	Position	Pld	W	D	L	GF	GA	Pld	W	D	L	GF	GA
1930 to 1962	Not a FIFA member								Not a FIFA member					
1966 to 1970	Did not enter								Did not enter					
(West Germany) 1974	Did not qualify								6	1	1	4	4	8
(Argentina) 1978	Did not qualify								12	8	1	3	23	10
(Spain) 1982	First group stage	21st	3	0	1	2	2	6	9	7	1	1	20	6
(Mexico) 1986	Did not qualify								4	2	1	1	8	2
(Italy) 1990	Did not qualify								4	3	0	1	6	3
(United States) 1994	Did not qualify								6	3	2	1	21	4
(France) 1998	Did not qualify								12	6	2	4	17	9
(South Korea) (Japan) 2002	Did not qualify								6	4	1	1	9	3
(Germany) 2006	Did not qualify								12	6	1	5	19	15
(South Africa) 2010	Did not qualify								6	1	1	4	8	12
(Brazil) 2014	Did not qualify								8	4	2	2	13	10
(Russia) 2018	Disqualified due to FIFA suspension								8	3	1	4	12	10
(Qatar) 2022	Did not qualify								8	4	2	2	19	7
(Canada) (Mexico) (United States) 2026	Did not qualify								16	2	6	8	13	26
(Morocco) (Portugal) (Spain) 2030	TBD								TBD					
(Saudi Arabia) 2034	TBD								TBD					
Total	First group stage	1/16	3	0	1	2	2	6	117	54	22	41	192	125

=== AFC Asian Cup ===
AFC Asian Cup record									Qualification record					
Year	Result	Position	Pld	W	D*	L	GF	GA	Pld	W	D	L	GF	GA
(Hong Kong) 1956	Not an AFC member								Not an AFC member					
(South Korea) 1960	Not an AFC member								Not an AFC member					
(Israel) 1964	Not an AFC member								Not an AFC member					
(Iran) 1968	Withdrew								Withdrew					
(Thailand) 1972	Group stage	5th	3	2	0	1	4	5	5	2	2	1	6	4
(Iran) 1976	Runners-up	2nd	4	3	0	1	6	3	Qualified by default					
(Kuwait) 1980	Champions	1st	6	4	1	1	13	6	Qualified as hosts					
(Singapore) 1984	Third place	3rd	6	2	2	2	5	4	Qualified as defending champions					
(Qatar) 1988	Group stage	7th	4	0	3	1	2	3	4	3	1	0	9	0
(Japan) 1992	Did not qualify								2	1	0	1	4	3
(United Arab Emirates) 1996	Fourth place	4th	6	2	2	2	9	7	4	2	2	0	9	5
(Lebanon) 2000	Quarter-finals	6th	4	1	2	1	3	3	4	4	0	0	33	1
(China) 2004	Group stage	10th	3	1	0	2	3	7	6	5	1	0	17	5
(Indonesia) (Malaysia) (Thailand) (Vietnam) 2007	Did not qualify								4	1	1	2	3	4
(Qatar) 2011	Group stage	14th	3	0	0	3	1	7	6	2	3	1	6	5
(Australia) 2015	Group stage	15th	3	0	0	3	1	6	6	2	3	1	10	7
(United Arab Emirates) 2019	Disqualified due to FIFA suspension								8	3	1	4	12	10
(Qatar) 2023	Did not qualify								11	5	2	4	24	13
(Saudi Arabia) 2027	Qualified								6	2	1	3	6	6
Total	Best: Champions	11/19	42	15	10	17	47	51	66	32	17	17	139	63

*Denotes draws include knockout matches decided via penalty shoot-out.
**Gold background colour indicates that the tournament was won. Red border colour indicates tournament was held on home soil.

=== Olympic Games ===
Olympic Games record
Year	Round	Pld	W	D	L	GF	GA
(France) 1900 to (Australia) 1956	Did not enter						
(Italy) 1960 to (Canada) 1976	Did not qualify						
(Soviet Union) 1980	Quarter-finals	4	1	2	1	5	4
(United States) 1984 to (South Korea) 1988	Did not qualify						
(Spain) 1992 to present	See Kuwait national under-23 football team						
Total	Best: Quarter-finals	4	1	2	1	5	4

=== Asian Games ===
Asian Games record
Year	Result	Pld	W	D	L	GF	GA
(India) 1951 to (Thailand) 1970	Did not enter						
(Iran) 1974	Sixth place	5	3	0	2	12	8
(Thailand) 1978	Fifth place	6	3	1	2	13	8
(India) 1982	Runners-up	6	5	0	1	13	5
(South Korea) 1986	Third place	7	5	2	0	20	3
(China) 1990	Seventh place	4	1	1	2	3	4
(Japan) 1994	Third place	6	4	1	1	15	6
(Thailand) 1998	Runners-up	8	3	2	3	23	8
(South Korea) 2002 to present	See Kuwait national under-23 football team						
Total	7/13	42	24	7	11	99	42

=== WAFF Championship ===
WAFF Championship record
Year	Result	Pld	W	D	L	GF	GA
(Jordan) 2000	Did not participate						
(Syria) 2002	Did not participate						
(Iran) 2004	Did not participate						
(Jordan) 2007	Did not participate						
(Iran) 2008	Did not participate						
(Jordan) 2010	Champions	4	2	2	0	7	5
(Kuwait) 2012	Group stage	3	2	0	1	4	4
(Qatar) 2014	Fourth place	4	1	1	2	3	5
(Iraq) 2019	Group stage	3	1	1	1	3	3
(Oman) 2026	Qualified						
Total	5/10	14	6	4	4	17	17

=== Arabian Gulf Cup ===
Arabian Gulf Cup record
Year	Result	Pld	W	D	L	GF	GA
(Bahrain) 1970	Champions	3	3	0	0	10	4
(Saudi Arabia) 1972	Champions	3	2	1	0	14	2
(Kuwait) 1974	Champions	4	4	0	0	16	0
(Qatar) 1976	Champions	7	5	2	0	26	7
(Iraq) 1979	Runners-up	6	4	1	1	15	4
(United Arab Emirates) 1982	Champions	5	4	0	1	8	2
(Oman) 1984	Sixth place	6	1	2	3	4	8
(Bahrain) 1986	Champions	6	5	1	0	11	4
(Saudi Arabia) 1988	Fifth place	6	1	2	3	3	4
(Kuwait) 1990	Champions	4	3	1	0	10	2
(Qatar) 1992	Fifth place	5	2	0	3	5	8
(United Arab Emirates) 1994	Fifth place	5	1	1	3	2	6
(Oman) 1996	Champions	5	4	0	1	7	4
(Bahrain) 1998	Champions	5	4	0	1	18	5
(Saudi Arabia) 2002	Fourth place	5	1	2	2	4	6
(Kuwait) 2003–04	Sixth place	6	1	2	3	6	9
(Qatar) 2004	Fourth place	5	2	1	2	7	7
(United Arab Emirates) 2007	Group stage	3	0	1	2	4	6
(Oman) 2009	Semi-finals	4	1	2	1	2	2
(Yemen) 2010	Champions	5	3	2	0	7	2
(Bahrain) 2013	Third place	5	3	0	2	9	3
(Saudi Arabia) 2014	Group stage	3	1	1	1	3	7
(Kuwait) 2017–18	Group stage	3	0	1	2	1	3
(Qatar) 2019	Group stage	3	1	0	2	6	7
(Iraq) 2023	Group stage	3	1	1	1	2	3
(Kuwait) 2024–25	Semi-finals	4	1	2	1	4	4
(Saudi Arabia) 2026	Group stage	3	0	0	3	3	7
27/27	Best: Champions	122	58	25	39	207	126

=== Arab Games ===
Arab Games record
Year	Round	Pld	W	D	L	GF	GA
1953 to 1957	Did not enter						
(Morocco) 1961	Sixth place	5	0	1	4	3	18
1965 to 1985	Did not enter						
(Lebanon) 1997	Fourth place	5	2	0	3	8	9
1999 to 2007	Did not enter						
(Qatar) 2011	Third place	4	3	0	1	7	2
2023 to present	See Kuwait national under-23 football team						
Total	3/10	14	5	1	8	18	29

=== Arab Cup ===
FIFA Arab Cup record
Year	Result	Pld	W	D	L	GF	GA
(Lebanon) 1963	Fourth place	4	1	0	3	5	15
(Kuwait) 1964	Fourth place	4	1	1	2	5	5
(Iraq) 1966	Group stage	4	1	1	2	10	9
(Saudi Arabia) 1985	Did not enter						
(Jordan) 1988	Group stage	4	1	1	2	2	3
(Syria) 1992	Third place	4	2	0	2	6	5
(Qatar) 1998	Third place	4	3	0	1	13	4
(Kuwait) 2002	Group stage	4	1	2	1	6	6
(Saudi Arabia) 2012	Group stage	2	1	0	1	2	4
(Qatar) 2021	Did not qualify						
(Qatar) 2025	Group stage	3	0	1	2	3	7
Total	Best: Third place	33	11	6	16	52	58

== Head-to-head record ==
The following table shows Kuwait's all-time international record,

As of 29 September 2026 after match against Oman

Positive Record Neutral Record Negative Record

All friendly and international matches have been approved, except for Olympic matches. A-level matches

Kuwait national football team head-to-head records
Opponent	Pld	W	D	L	GF	GA	GD
Afghanistan	3	3	0	0	8	2	+6
Algeria	2	1	0	1	2	1	+1
Armenia	1	1	0	0	3	1	+2
Australia	14	5	2	7	12	22	-10
Azerbaijan	2	0	2	0	2	2	0
Bahrain	51	22	14	15	72	50	+22
Bangladesh	3	3	0	0	7	1	+6
Bhutan	1	1	0	0	20	0	+20
Bosnia and Herzegovina	1	0	0	1	0	1	-1
Bulgaria	5	0	3	2	6	9	-3
Cambodia	1	0	0	1	0	4	-4
Cameroon	1	0	0	1	1	3	-2
China	20	5	5	10	17	29	-12
Colombia	1	0	0	1	1	3	-2
Cyprus	1	0	1	0	1	1	0
Czech Republic	2	0	0	2	1	9	-8
Czechoslovakia	1	0	1	0	1	1	0
Ecuador	1	0	0	1	0	3	-3
Egypt	15	2	8	5	15	25	-10
England	1	0	0	1	0	1	-1
Finland	7	2	2	3	5	6	-1
France	2	0	0	2	1	5	-4
Gambia	1	0	1	0	2	2	0
Germany	1	0	0	1	0	7	-7
East Germany	2	0	0	2	2	4	-2
Hong Kong	7	6	1	0	18	4	+14
Hungary	2	0	0	2	0	2	-2
Iceland	7	1	4	2	3	4	-1
India	7	2	3	2	19	8	+11
Indonesia	7	2	3	2	12	8	+4
Iran	29	7	8	13	27	35	-8
Iraq	39	10	12	17	42	53	-11
Ivory Coast	1	0	0	1	0	2	-2
Japan	5	4	0	1	8	2	+6
Jordan	31	10	13	8	41	36	+5
Kazakhstan	1	0	1	0	0	0	0
Kenya	1	1	0	0	5	0	+5
North Korea	14	6	7	1	20	12	+8
South Korea	25	8	3	14	21	37	-16
Kyrgyzstan	5	3	1	1	11	5	+6
Laos	1	1	0	0	2	0	+2
Latvia	2	1	1	0	3	1	+2
Lebanon	32	16	9	7	54	30	+24
Libya	7	2	2	3	9	13	-4
Lithuania	2	1	1	0	2	1	+1
Macau	2	2	0	0	18	1	+17
Malaysia	13	9	2	2	33	8	+25
Malta	1	0	0	1	0	2	-2
Mali	3	3	0	0	14	4	+10
Mauritania	2	2	0	0	5	1	+4
Mexico	1	0	1	0	0	0	0
Mongolia	1	1	0	0	11	0	+11
Morocco	7	1	2	4	9	13	-4
Myanmar	6	4	0	2	21	8	+13
Nepal	10	9	1	0	37	3	+34
Niger	1	1	0	0	3	1	+2
New Zealand	3	1	1	1	5	8	-3
Norway	3	1	2	0	4	3	+1
Oman	35	12	11	12	49	36	+13
Pakistan	4	4	0	0	10	0	+10
Palestine	11	7	2	2	22	11	+11
Philippines	4	4	0	0	9	2	+7
Poland	2	0	1	1	1	3	-2
Portugal	2	0	1	1	1	9	-8
Qatar	42	18	6	17	57	48	+9
Romania	2	0	1	1	1	2	-1
Russia	2	0	0	2	0	3	-3
Saudi Arabia	43	15	12	16	44	45	–1
Singapore	10	7	2	1	20	6	+14
Sudan	2	3	0	0	3	1	+2
Soviet Union	1	0	0	1	0	1	-1
Syria	35	14	10	11	54	40	+14
Chinese Taipei	3	3	0	0	21	1	+20
Tajikistan	2	2	0	0	5	1	+4
Tanzania	1	1	0	0	4	3	+1
Thailand	13	7	2	4	32	20	+12
Trinidad and Tobago	1	0	1	0	1	1	0
Tunisia	3	0	0	3	2	8	-6
Turkmenistan	5	3	2	0	13	4	+9
Uganda	2	0	1	1	1	3	-3
United Arab Emirates	48	19	8	18	73	53	+20
United States	1	0	0	1	0	2	-2
Uzbekistan	7	2	1	4	9	14	-5
Vietnam	2	1	0	1	3	2	+1
South Vietnam	1	1	0	0	2	1	+1
Wales	2	0	2	0	0	0	0
Yemen	11	5	5	1	19	6	+13
South Yemen	1	1	0	0	5	1	+4
Zambia	3	3	0	0	9	1	+8
Zimbabwe	1	1	0	0	3	0	+3
Total	723	293	184	247	937	819	+118

== Honours ==
=== Continental ===
- AFC Asian Cup
  - Champions (1): 1980
  - (silver) Runners-up (1): 1976
  - (bronze) Third place (1): 1984
- Asian Games (Note: Competition organized by OCA, officially not recognized by FIFA.)
  - (silver) Silver medal (2): 1982, 1998
  - (bronze) Bronze medal (2): 1986, 1994

=== Regional ===
- Arab Cup
  - (bronze) Third place (2): 1992, (Note: The 1992 Arab Cup also counted as an edition of the Arab Games.) 1998
- Arab Games
  - (bronze) Bronze medal (2): 1992, 2011
- Arabian Gulf Cup
  - (gold) Champions (10): 1970, 1972, 1974, 1976, 1982, 1986, 1990, 1996, 1998, 2010
  - (silver) Runners-up (1): 1979
  - (bronze) Third place (1): 2013, 2002
- West Asian Games
  - (gold) Gold medal (1): 2002
  - (bronze) Bronze medal (1): 1997
- WAFF Championship
  - (gold) Champions (1): 2010
- SAFF Championship
  - (silver) Runners-up (1): 2023

=== Friendly ===
- Focus International Cup (1): 2011

=== Awards ===
- Arabian Gulf Cup Fair Play Award (1): 2017–18

=== Summary ===
Only official honours are included, according to FIFA statutes (competitions organized/recognized by FIFA or an affiliated confederation).

Competition	1st place, gold medalist(s)	2nd place, silver medalist(s)	3rd place, bronze medalist(s)	Total
AFC Asian Cup	1	1	1	3
Total	1	1	1	3

== See also ==
- Kuwait national football team
- Kuwait national under-23 football team
- Kuwait national under-20 football team
- Kuwait national under-17 football team
- Kuwait women's national football team

== Notes ==
Preceded by 1976 Iran	Asian Champions; 1980 (First title)	Succeeded by 1984 Saudi Arabia
