= 1st Arabian Gulf Cup =

International football tournament in 1970

1970 Arabian Gulf Cup
دورة كأس الخليج العربي الأولى (in Arabic)

Tournament details
- Host country: Bahrain
- Dates: 27 March – 3 April
- Teams: 4
- Venue: 1 (in 1 host city)

Final positions
- Champions: Kuwait (1st title)
- Runners-up: Bahrain
- Third place: Saudi Arabia
- Fourth place: Qatar

Tournament statistics
- Matches played: 6
- Goals scored: 19 (3.17 per match)
- Top scorer(s): (Kuwait) Jawad Khalaf (Kuwait) Mohammed Al-Masoud (3 goals each)
- Best player: (Qatar) Khaled Ballan
- Best goalkeeper: (Saudi Arabia) Ahmed Eid Al-Harbi

The 1st Arabian Gulf Cup (Arabic: دورة كأس الخليج العربي الأولى) was the inaugural international association football championship for the national teams of the Arabian Peninsula and bordering the Persian Gulf. Hosted by Bahrain, the competition ran from 27 March to 3 April 1970 and was contested by the national teams of Bahrain, Kuwait, Qatar and Saudi Arabia.

Played as a round-robin tournament, Kuwait were crowned champions of the inaugural competition after defeating Bahrain 3–1 in the final and ultimately decisive match.

== Background ==
The first edition of the biennial Arabian Gulf Cup was held in Isa Town, Bahrain.

== Format ==
The four teams contested a single round robin group. After every team had played each other, the team with the most points would be the winner.

=== Participants ===
- Bahrain
- Kuwait
- Qatar
- Saudi Arabia

== Venue ==
All matches were played at the Isa Town Stadium in Isa Town.

| 1st Arabian Gulf Cup is located in Bahrain | Isa Town |
|---|---|
| 1st Arabian Gulf Cup is located in Bahrain | Isa Town Stadium |
| 1st Arabian Gulf Cup is located in Bahrain | Capacity: 15,000 |

== Summary ==
The competition began on 27 March 1970 when goals from Ahmed Salmeen and Hassan Zuleikh helped hosts Bahrain to a 2–1 win against Qatar. The following day, Kuwait came from behind to defeat Saudi Arabia 3–1. On 30 March, Bahrain and Saudi Arabia played out a goalless draw. Kuwait then seized the initiative as they recorded a 4–2 win against Qatar the following day. With one round of matches left, Kuwait were top of the standings with four points from a possible four, one ahead of Bahrain.

On 2 April, Saudi Arabia and Qatar played out a 1–1 draw in what was ultimately a dead rubber. As a result, Saudi Arabia finished third and Qatar fourth. The following day, Kuwait faced Bahrain in what was effectively the decisive match of the tournament. Bahrain needed to win but a draw would be enough for Kuwait. Jawad Khalaf scored early for Kuwait to give them a 1–0 lead but they were pegged back easly in the second half by a goal from Yousef Ameen. A goal from Mohammed Al-Masoud restored Kuwait's advantage and Mahmoud Diksin scored a third to seal the match and the inaugural title.

== Table ==
| Pos | Team | Pld | W | D | L | GF | GA | GD | Pts | Qualification |
|---|---|---|---|---|---|---|---|---|---|---|
| 1 | Kuwait | 3 | 3 | 0 | 0 | 10 | 4 | +6 | 6 | Champions |
| 2 | Bahrain | 3 | 1 | 1 | 1 | 3 | 4 | −1 | 3 | |
| 3 | Saudi Arabia | 3 | 0 | 2 | 1 | 2 | 4 | −2 | 2 | |
| 4 | Qatar | 3 | 0 | 1 | 2 | 4 | 7 | −3 | 1 | |

=== Matches ===
27 March 1970
16:00

| Bahrain | 2–1 | Qatar |
|---|---|---|
| Salmeen 14'; Zuleikh 43' | | Faraj 55' (pen.) |

Isa Town Stadium, Isa Town
Referee: Sobhi Naseer (Egypt)
28 March 1970
16:00

| Kuwait | 3–1 | Saudi Arabia |
|---|---|---|
| Diksin 43'; Khalaf 67'; Al-Masoud 83' | | Al-Abdali 2' |

Isa Town Stadium, Isa Town
Referee: Abdeen Ibrahim (Sudan)

30 March 1970
16:00

| Bahrain | 0–0 | Saudi Arabia |

Isa Town Stadium, Isa Town
Referee: Sobhi Naseer (Egypt)
31 March 1970
16:00

| Kuwait | 4–2 | Qatar |
|---|---|---|
| Khalaf 25'; Al-Masoud 39'; Sattam 65'; Ibrahim 82' | | Ballan 40'; Almas 66' (pen.) |

Isa Town Stadium, Isa Town
Referee: Abdulrahman Al-Daham (Saudi Arabia)

2 April 1970
16:00

| Saudi Arabia | 1–1 | Qatar |
|---|---|---|
| Mousa 20' | | Ballan 45+1' |

Isa Town Stadium, Isa Town
Referee: Yousef Al-Suwaidan (Kuwait)
3 April 1970
16:00

| Kuwait | 3–1 | Bahrain |
|---|---|---|
| Khalaf 3'; Al-Masoud 56'; Diksin 75' | | Ameen 50' |

Isa Town Stadium, Isa Town
Referee: Abdeen Ibrahim (Sudan)

== Statistics ==
=== Goalscorers ===
There were 19 goals scored in 6 matches, for an average of 3.17 goals per match.

3 goals

- (Kuwait) Mohammed Al-Masoud
- (Kuwait) Jawad Khalaf

2 goals

- (Kuwait) Mahmoud Diksin
- (Qatar) Khaled Ballan

1 goal

- (Bahrain) Yousef Ameen
- (Bahrain) Ahmed Salmeen
- (Bahrain) Hassan Zulaikh
- (Kuwait) Farouq Ibrahim
- (Kuwait) Khalaf Sattam
- (Qatar) Sulaiman Almas
- (Qatar) Mubarak Faraj
- (Saudi Arabia) Mohammed Saad Al-Abdali
- (Saudi Arabia) Alnoor Mousa

=== Awards ===
Player of the Tournament

- (Qatar) Khaled Ballan

Top Scorer

- (Kuwait) Mohammed Al-Masoud (3 goals)
- (Kuwait) Jawad Khalaf (3 goals)

Goalkeeper of the Tournament

- (Saudi Arabia) Ahmed Eid Al-Harbi
