= Syria national football team results (1940–1999) =

This is a list of the competitive matches played by the Syrian football team since its inception.

== International matches ==
=== 1940s ===
26 April 1942 Friendly	Lebanon	1–2	Syria	Beirut, Lebanon
--:--	Abou Nader 30'			Stadium: AUB Stadium; Attendance: 3,000; Referee: Tringle (England)

10 March 1944 Friendly	Syria	1–2	Iraq	Damascus, Syria

4 May 1947 Friendly	Lebanon	1–4	Syria	Beirut, Lebanon
16:00 UTC+2	Vartivar (pen.)			Stadium: Beirut Municipal Stadium; Attendance: 6,000; Referee: Şazi Tezcan (Turkey)

18 May 1947 Friendly	Syria	1–0	Lebanon	Aleppo, Syria
--:--				Referee: Mohammad Badereddine (Syria)

20 November 1949 1950 FIFA World Cup qualification	Turkey	7–0	Syria	Ankara, Turkey
	Cansever 12', 16', 87'; Eken 44'; Küçükandonyadis 66'; Keskin 67'; Kılıç 72'	(Report)		Stadium: 19 Mayıs Stadium; Attendance: 35,000; Referee: Antonio Gamba (Italy)

25 November 1949 Friendly	Greece	8–0	Syria	Athens, Greece
	Papantoniou 15', 17', 60'; Vasileiadis 25', 73'; Maropoulos 27'; Nembidis 79', 89'	(Report)		Stadium: Leoforos Alexandras Stadium; Attendance: 15,000; Referee: Yiannis Tsitsis (Greece)

=== 1950s ===
14 October 1951 Football at the 1951 Mediterranean Games	Greece	4–0	Syria	Alexandria, Egypt
	Lekatsas 18', 23', 71'; Mouratis 75' (pen.)	(Report)		Stadium: Alexandria Stadium; Attendance: 10,000; Referee: Mohammed Al-Sayed (Egypt)

16 October 1951 Football at the 1951 Mediterranean Games	Egypt	8–0	Syria	Alexandria, Egypt
	El-Mekkawi; El-Dhizui; El Guendi; Rached; Abdel-Moula (pen.)			Stadium: Alexandria Stadium

1 August 1953 Football at the 1953 Pan Arab Games	Syria	3–1	Jordan	Alexandria, Egypt
	Al-Aqqad 28', 75'; Yaqoub 35'			Stadium: Alexandria Stadium

6 August 1953 Football at the 1953 Pan Arab Games	Lebanon	0–0	Syria	Alexandria, Egypt

9 August 1953 Football at the 1953 Pan Arab Games	Egypt	4–0	Syria	Alexandria, Egypt
	Ad-Diba 25', 66'; El-Dhizui 75'; Rous 88'			Stadium: Alexandria Stadium, Alexandria; Referee: Joseph Nalbadian (Lebanon)

23 July 1955 Football at the 1955 Mediterranean Games	Egypt	3–0	Syria	Barcelona, Spain
	El-Dhizui 17', 25'; Abdel Fattah 84'			Stadium: Camp de Les Corts

1957 Friendly	Syria	6–1	Jordan	Syria

8 March 1957 1958 FIFA World Cup qualification	Sudan	1–0	Syria	Khartoum, Sudan
	Manzul 78' (pen.)			Stadium: Khartoum Stadium; Attendance: 12,500; Referee: Riccardo Pieri (Italy)

24 May 1957 1958 FIFA World Cup qualification	Syria	1–1	Sudan	Damascus, Syria
	Al-Zarqa 70'		Faris 38'	Stadium: Abbasiyyin Stadium; Attendance: 12,500; Referee: Konstantinos Ioannidis (Greece)

18 October 1957 Football at the 1957 Pan Arab Games	Syria	4–0	Jordan	Beirut, Lebanon

20 October 1957 Football at the 1957 Pan Arab Games	Lebanon	1–1	Syria	Beirut, Lebanon

22 October 1957 Football at the 1957 Pan Arab Games	Saudi Arabia	3–1	Syria	Beirut, Lebanon
	Al-Yafei 14', 55'; Janja 75'		Mahmoud 34'	Stadium: Camille Chamoun Stadium

26 October 1957 Football at the 1957 Pan Arab Games	Morocco	1–1	Syria	Beirut, Lebanon

27 October 1957 Football at the 1957 Pan Arab Games	Syria	3–1	Tunisia	Beirut, Lebanon
	Shamas; Kaoulakian

1959 Friendly	Morocco	1–0	Syria	Morocco

=== 1960s ===
31 March 1963	Syria	4–0	Jordan

2 April 1963	Tunisia	1–0	Syria

4 April 1963	Lebanon	2–3	Syria

7 April 1963	Syria	4–0	Kuwait

21 September 1963	Morocco	1–0	Syria

27 September 1963	Tunisia	3–1	Syria

4 September 1965	Libya	6–3	Syria

6 September 1965	Syria	13–0	Muscat and Oman

7 September 1965	Sudan	2–0	Syria

2 April 1966	Syria	4–1	North Yemen

4 April 1966	Libya	0–0	Syria

6 April 1966	Syria	3–1	Palestine

8 April 1966	Syria	1–0	Lebanon

10 April 1966	Iraq	2–1	Syria

23 July 1966	China	6–0	Syria	Beijing, China

=== 1970s ===
28 May 1971 1972 Olympic Qualifiers	Syria	0–0	North Korea	Damascus, Syria

1 June 1971 1972 Olympic Qualifiers	North Korea	1–0	Syria	Pyongyang, North Korea
	Kim 30'

9 July 1971 Friendly	Libya	2–1	Syria	Tripoli, Libya
				Stadium: 11 June Stadium

11 July 1971	Egypt	1–0	Syria

12 October 1971 1971 Mediterranean Games	Tunisia	1–0	Syria	İzmir, Turkey
	Khouini 79'

11 December 1971 1972 AFC Asian Cup qualification	Jordan	0–0 (3–4 p)	Syria	Kuwait

17 December 1971 1972 AFC Asian Cup qualification	Kuwait	2–2	Syria	Kuwait
	Khalaf; Ibrahim		? ?

19 December 1971 1972 AFC Asian Cup qualification	Lebanon	3–2	Syria	Kuwait
	Mantoufi 23'; Al Ghoul 35', 55'		Said 3'; Nano 25'	Referee: Fernando (Ceylon)

1 January 1972 1972 Palestine Cup of Nations	Syria	1–0	South Yemen	Baghdad, Iraq
				Stadium: Al-Shaab Stadium

4 January 1972 1972 Palestine Cup of Nations	Syria	3–1	Palestine	Baghdad, Iraq
				Stadium: Al-Shaab Stadium

6 January 1972 1972 Palestine Cup of Nations	Syria	3–2	Qatar	Baghdad, Iraq
				Stadium: Al-Shaab Stadium

8 January 1972 1972 Palestine Cup of Nations	Syria	1–0	Algeria	Baghdad, Iraq
				Stadium: Al-Shaab Stadium

12 January 1972 1972 Palestine Cup of Nations	Egypt	4–2 (a.e.t.)	Syria	Baghdad, Iraq
	Reyadh 8'; Shehta 83'; El-Shazly 110', 117' (pen.)		? ?	Stadium: Al-Shaab Stadium

13 January 1972 1972 Palestine Cup of Nations	Algeria	3–1	Syria	Baghdad, Iraq
	Dahleb 15'; Salhi 68', 75'		?	Stadium: Al-Shaab Stadium

4 May 1973 1974 FIFA World Cup qualification	Syria	2–1	Kuwait	Tehran, Iran
	Chahrestan 62'; Nano 65'	(Report)	Al Duraihem 57'	Stadium: Aryamehr Stadium; Attendance: 63,366; Referee: Hamza Ali Mirza (Bahrain)

6 May 1973 1974 FIFA World Cup qualification	North Korea	1–1	Syria	Tehran, Iran
	Kim Jong-Min 53'		Chahrestan 71'	Stadium: Amjadieh Stadium; Attendance: 11,940; Referee: Vijit Getkaew (Thailand)

8 May 1973 1974 FIFA World Cup qualification	Iran	1–0	Syria	Tehran, Iran
	Kargarjam 85'	(Report)		Stadium: Amjadieh Stadium; Attendance: 6,028; Referee: Manit Sridaranop (Thailand)

11 May 1973 1974 FIFA World Cup qualification	Syria	2–0	Kuwait	Tehran, Iran
	Said 18'; Chahrestan 90'	(Report)		Stadium: Aryamehr Stadium; Attendance: 53,829; Referee: Hamza Ali Mirza (Bahrain)

13 May 1973 1974 FIFA World Cup qualification	North Korea	3–0	Syria	Tehran, Iran
	An Se-Uk 30'; Ma Jung-U 39', 77'	(Report)		Stadium: Aryamehr Stadium; Attendance: 11,940; Referee: Alex Vaz (India)

15 May 1973 1974 FIFA World Cup qualification	Iran	0–1	Syria	Tehran, Iran
		(Report)	Tatiche 12'	Stadium: Amjadieh Stadium; Attendance: 22,362; Referee: Sarkis Demirdjian (Lebanon)

21 July 1973 1973 Palestine Cup of Nations	Syria	1–1	Palestine	Tripoli, Libya
	Nanu (?)		?	Stadium: 11 June Stadium

13 August 1973 1973 Palestine Cup of Nations	Tunisia	4–1	Syria	Tripoli, Libya
	Habita 44', 58', 73'; Akid 86'		Sman (?)	Stadium: 11 June Stadium; Attendance: 5,000

16 August 1973 1973 Palestine Cup of Nations	Syria	7–1	North Yemen	Tripoli, Libya
	Saeed (?); Sman (?); Chahrestan (?); Tatesh (?); Serur (?)		?	Stadium: 11 June Stadium

20 August 1973 1973 Palestine Cup of Nations	Syria	2–0	Egypt	Tripoli, Libya
	Chahrestan 20', 45'			Stadium: 11 June Stadium

23 August 1973 1973 Palestine Cup of Nations	Algeria	0–0 (2–3 p)	Syria	Benghazi, Libya
				Stadium: March 28 Stadium

26 August 1973 1973 Palestine Cup of Nations	Tunisia	4–0	Syria	Tripoli, Libya
	Chakroun 42'; Akid 73'; Khouini 88'; Mahlami (?)			Stadium: 11 June Stadium; Attendance: 30,000

1974	Syria	2–0	Jordan

26 September 1974 1974 Kuneitra Cup	Syria	2–0	Palestine	Damascus, Syria
	Tughli; Esfahani			Stadium: Abbasiyyin Stadium

28 September 1974 1974 Kuneitra Cup	Syria	2–1	Libya	Damascus, Syria
	Nano; Sorour		Al-Ghazali	Stadium: Abbasiyyin Stadium

2 October 1974 1974 Kuneitra Cup	Syria	2–0	Sudan	Damascus, Syria
	Sorour; Goutouk			Stadium: Abbasiyyin Stadium

4 October 1974 1974 Kuneitra Cup	Syria	6–0	North Yemen	Damascus, Syria
	Goutouq; Hatmah; Sorour; Berjakli; Mahlami			Stadium: Abbasiyyin Stadium

7 October 1974 1974 Kuneitra Cup	Syria	3–1	Tunisia	Damascus, Syria
	Lotfi; Tughli; Said		Boughanieh	Stadium: Abbasiyyin Stadium

9 October 1974 1974 Kuneitra Cup	Syria	1–1 (3–4 p)	Morocco	Damascus, Syria
	Goutouq		Faras	Stadium: Abbasiyyin Stadium

21 December 1975 1975 Palestine Cup of Nations	Syria	3–2	Libya	Tunis, Tunisia

23 December 1975 1975 Palestine Cup of Nations	Libya	1–0	Syria	Tunis, Tunisia

25 December 1975 1975 Palestine Cup of Nations	Iraq	4–0	Syria	Tunis, Tunisia
	Kadhim 2' (pen.), 20'; Hassan 23'; Subhi 73'

28 December 1975 1975 Palestine Cup of Nations	Sudan	1–0	Syria	Tunis, Tunisia

7 October 1976 1976 Arab Games	Syria	1–0	Jordan	Damascus, Syria
				Stadium: Abbasiyyin Stadium

10 October 1976 1976 Arab Games	Syria	1–2	South Yemen	Damascus, Syria
				Stadium: Abbasiyyin Stadium

14 October 1976 1976 Arab Games	Syria	2–0	Mauritania	Damascus, Syria
				Stadium: Abbasiyyin Stadium

16 October 1976 1976 Arab Games	Syria	2–0	Palestine	Damascus, Syria
				Stadium: Abbasiyyin Stadium

18 October 1976 1976 Arab Games	Syria	0–0	Morocco	Damascus, Syria

21 October 1976 1976 Arab Games	Syria	0–2	Saudi Arabia	Damascus, Syria
			Hamdan 5'; Khalifa 45'	Stadium: Abbasiyyin Stadium

12 November 1976 1978 FIFA World Cup qualification	Saudi Arabia	2–0	Syria	Jeddah, Saudi Arabia
	Al Fahad 22'; Bo Saeed 54'			Stadium: Prince Abdullah al-Faisal Stadium; Attendance: Dörflinger (Switzerland)

26 November 1976 1978 FIFA World Cup qualification	Syria	2–1	Saudi Arabia	Damascus, Syria
	Al Katbi 36'; Khouri 82'		Ghani 44'	Stadium: Abbasiyyin Stadium; Referee: Doğan Babacan (Turkey)

1977 Friendly	Syria	0–1	Jordan

28 January 1977 1978 FIFA World Cup qualification	Syria	0–1	Iran	Damascus, Syria
			Parvin 36'	Stadium: Abbasiyyin Stadium; Attendance: 22,000; Referee: Robert Fratz (France)

26 February 1978 Friendly	Syria	0–1	Algeria	Damascus, Syria
			Belkedrouci 50'

13 July 1978 Merdeka Tournament	Indonesia	1–0	Syria	Kuala Lumpur, Malaysia
	Timo Kapisa 51'			Stadium: Stadium Merdeka

15 July 1978 Merdeka Tournament	Iraq	2–1	Syria	Kuala Lumpur, Malaysia
	Hassan 11'; Subhi 84'		?	Stadium: Stadium Merdeka

17 July 1978 Merdeka Tournament	Japan	3–2	Syria	Kuala Lumpur, Malaysia
	Usui 3', 8'; Ochiai 44'		? 16' ? 54'	Stadium: Stadium Merdeka

20 July 1978 Merdeka Tournament	Thailand	3–1	Syria	Kuala Lumpur, Malaysia
				Stadium: Stadium Merdeka

23 July 1978 Merdeka Tournament	Malaysia	5–2	Syria	Kuala Lumpur, Malaysia
				Stadium: Stadium Merdeka

25 July 1978 Merdeka Tournament	Singapore	4–1	Syria	Kuala Lumpur, Malaysia
				Stadium: Stadium Merdeka

27 July 1978 Merdeka Tournament	South Korea	2–0	Syria	Kuala Lumpur, Malaysia
	Park Sung-hwa 65', 84'			Stadium: Stadium Merdeka

19 December 1978 Friendly	Syria	2–1	Tunisia

18 November 1979 1980 AFC Asian Cup qualification	Bahrain	1–1; Cancelled	Syria	Abu Dhabi, UAE
				Stadium: Mohammed bin Zayed Stadium

20 November 1979 1980 AFC Asian Cup qualification	United Arab Emirates	0–0	Syria	Abu Dhabi, UAE
				Stadium: Mohammed bin Zayed Stadium

22 November 1979 1980 AFC Asian Cup qualification	Syria	1–0	Lebanon	Abu Dhabi, UAE
	Qaddour 21'			Stadium: Mohammed bin Zayed Stadium; Referee: Abdulwahab Binai (Kuwait)

=== 1980s ===
February 1980	Syria	1–2	Jordan

17 March 1980 1980 Olympics Qualifiers	Kuwait	1–0	Syria	Baghdad
				Stadium: Al-Shaab Stadium

19 March 1980 1980 Olympics Qualifiers	Syria	2–1	South Yemen	Baghdad
				Stadium: Al-Shaab Stadium

22 March 1980 1980 Olympics Qualifiers	Syria	2–0	Jordan	Baghdad
				Stadium: Al-Shaab Stadium

29 March 1980 1980 Olympics Qualifiers	Iraq	1–0	Syria	Baghdad
	Ashraf 70'			Stadium: Al-Shaab Stadium

20 July 1980 1980 Olympic Games	Algeria	3–0	Syria	Minsk, Soviet Union
	Belloumi 36'; Madjer 48'; Merzekane 73' (pen.)	Report		Stadium: Dinamo Stadium; Referee: Vojtech Christov (Czechoslovakia)

22 July 1980 1980 Olympic Games	Spain	0–0	Syria	Minsk, Soviet Union
		Report		Stadium: Dinamo Stadium; Referee: José Castro Lozada (Venezuela)

24 July 1980 1980 Olympic Games	East Germany	5–0	Syria	Republican Stadium, Kyiv
	Hause 6'; Netz 25', 45'; Peter 75'; Terletzki 82'	Report		Attendance: 80,000; Referee: Ulf Eriksson (Sweden)

17 September 1980 1980 AFC Asian Cup	Iran	0–0	Syria	Kuwait City, Kuwait
				Stadium: Sabah Al Salem Stadium; Attendance: 15,000

19 September 1980 1980 AFC Asian Cup	Syria	1–0	Bangladesh	Kuwait City, Kuwait
	Keshek 7'			Stadium: Sabah Al Salem Stadium

23 September 1980 1980 AFC Asian Cup	Syria	1–0	China	Kuwait City, Kuwait
	Keshek 86'			Stadium: Sabah Al Salem Stadium

26 September 1980 1980 AFC Asian Cup	North Korea	2–1	Syria	Kuwait City, Kuwait
	Kim Gwan-Mo; Kim Gwang-Un		Suleiman	Stadium: Sabah Al Salem Stadium

15 February 1981	Morocco	3–0	Syria

19 March 1981 1982 FIFA World Cup qualification	Bahrain	1–0	Syria	Riyadh, Saudi Arabia
	Bushegir 89' (pen.)			Stadium: Al Malaz Stadium; Attendance: 4,154; Referee: Sano (Japan)

24 March 1981 1982 FIFA World Cup qualification	Saudi Arabia	2–0	Syria	Riyadh, Saudi Arabia
	Jassem 47', 62'			Stadium: Al Malaz Stadium; Attendance: 30,000; Referee: Nishi (Japan)

27 March 1981 1982 FIFA World Cup qualification	Qatar	2–1	Syria	Riyadh, Saudi Arabia
	Khalfan 8'; Muftah 53'		Jehad 15'	Stadium: Al Malaz Stadium; Attendance: 3,967; Referee: Rampley (Australia)

30 March 1981 1982 FIFA World Cup qualification	Iraq	2–1	Syria	Riyadh, Saudi Arabia
	Ashraf 34'; Khudhair 63'		Jehad 47'	Stadium: Al Malaz Stadium; Attendance: 3,285; Referee: Rampley (Australia)

15 April 1982	Syria	0–1	Cyprus

20 November 1982	North Korea	1–1	Syria

22 November 1982	Saudi Arabia	1–1	Syria

24 November 1982	Thailand	3–1	Syria

12 February 1983	Syria	2–2	Japan

7 June 1983	Japan	1–0	Syria

12 August 1983	Syria	3–2	Jordan

16 August 1983	Jordan	0–1	Syria

11 September 1983	Egypt	1–0	Syria

14 October 1983	Syria	1–3	Kuwait

21 October 1983	Syria	1–1	Qatar

4 November 1983	Kuwait	1–3	Syria

11 November 1983	Qatar	1–0	Syria

7 August 1984 1984 AFC Asian Cup qualification	Syria	2–0	Philippines	Jakarta, Indonesia
	Nabil El-Sibai 42'; Marwan Madarati 60'			Stadium: Senayan Stadium

9 August 1984 1984 AFC Asian Cup qualification	Iran	3–1	Syria	Solo, Indonesia
	Alidousti 3', 76'; Mohammadkhani 67'		Hasan 4'	Stadium: Sriwedari Stadium; Attendance: 20,000; Referee: Yu Jong-Lin (Korea DPR)

11 August 1984 1984 AFC Asian Cup qualification	Syria	2–1	Bangladesh	Jakarta, Indonesia
	Waleed Abou El-Sil 6'; Marwan Madarati 89'		Kazi Jasimuddin 44'	Stadium: Senayan Stadium

13 August 1984 1984 AFC Asian Cup qualification	Thailand	3–2	Syria	Jakarta, Indonesia
	Chalee Pirom 61'; Thanis Areesngarkul 72'; Chalor Hongkajohn 78'		Nabil El-Sibai 9'; Abdul Kader Kardaghli 84'	Stadium: Senayan Stadium

15 August 1984 1984 AFC Asian Cup qualification	Indonesia	1–2	Syria	Jakarta, Indonesia
	Sain Irmis 27'		Abdul Kader Kardaghli 78'; Fouad Aziz 85'	Stadium: Senayan Stadium; Attendance: 65,000

18 August 1984 1984 AFC Asian Cup qualification	Iran	1–0	Syria	Jakarta, Indonesia
	Alidosti 13'			Stadium: Senayan Stadium; Attendance: 40,000; Referee: Kim Soo-Duck (Korea Republic)

25 November 1984	United Arab Emirates	2–1	Syria

1 December 1984 1984 AFC Asian Cup	Qatar	1–1	Syria	Singapore
	Khalfan 7'		Anber 47' (o.g.)	Stadium: National Stadium; Attendance: 8,000; Referee: Antonio Márquez (Mexico)

4 December 1984 1984 AFC Asian Cup	Saudi Arabia	1–0	Syria	Singapore
	Khalifa 66'			Stadium: National Stadium; Attendance: 2,000; Referee: Shizuo Takada (Japan)

7 December 1984 1984 AFC Asian Cup	Syria	1–0	South Korea	Singapore
	Hassan 12'			Stadium: National Stadium; Attendance: 10,000; Referee: George Courtney (England)

9 December 1984 1984 AFC Asian Cup	Kuwait	3–1	Syria	Singapore
	Mahrous 66' (o.g.); Al-Dakhil 77'; A. Al-Buloushi 79'		Abu Al-Sel 5'	Stadium: National Stadium; Attendance: 8,000; Referee: Cheung Kwok Kui (Hong Kong)

1985	Saudi Arabia	1–1	Syria

1985	Saudi Arabia	3–1	Syria

22 March 1985	Syria	1–0	Kuwait

29 March 1985	North Yemen	0–1	Syria

2 April 1985	Syria	2–1	United Arab Emirates

7 April 1985	United Arab Emirates	4–0	Syria

12 April 1985	Kuwait	0–0	Syria

19 April 1985	Syria	3–0	North Yemen

12 July 1985	Syria	2–2	North Korea

7 August 1985	Libya	2–0	Syria

12 August 1985	Iraq	2–0	Syria

6 September 1985	Bahrain	1–1	Syria

20 September 1985	Syria	1–0	Bahrain

15 November 1985	Syria	0–0	Iraq

29 November 1985	Iraq	3–1	Syria

25 July 1986	Japan	2–1	Syria

1987	Bahrain	0–0	Syria

1987	Bahrain	0–2	Syria

26 January 1987	Nigeria	1–0	Syria	India

19 March 1987	United Arab Emirates	1–1	Syria

23 March 1987	United Arab Emirates	2–1	Syria

17 April 1987	Qatar	2–0	Syria

24 April 1987	Qatar	0–1	Syria

18 September 1987	Syria	3–0	San Marino

20 September 1987	Syria	6–1	Lebanon

1988	Jordan	0–0	Syria

26 May 1988 1988 AFC Asian Cup qualification	Syria	2–1	North Korea	Kathmandu, Nepal
	Al Nasser 28'; Kareghli 90'		Kang Myong-sam 45'	Stadium: Dasarath Rangasala Stadium

29 May 1988 1988 AFC Asian Cup qualification	Iran	1–1	Syria	Kathmandu, Nepal
	Siflan 13'		Bavi 73'	Stadium: Dasarath Rangasala Stadium; Referee: Abdulaziz Mohamed (UAE)

1 June 1988 1988 AFC Asian Cup qualification	Nepal	0–3	Syria	Kathmandu, Nepal
			? Ahmed 23'; Al Nasser 65'	Stadium: Dasarath Rangasala Stadium

3 June 1988 1988 AFC Asian Cup qualification	Syria	2–0	Hong Kong	Kathmandu, Nepal
	Kardeghli 48'; Mahrous 73'			Stadium: Dasarath Rangasala Stadium

24 June 1988	Syria	1–0	Jordan

2 July 1988	Syria	2–0	Tunisia

4 July 1988	Syria	0–0	Tunisia

12 July 1988	Syria	2–1	Bahrain

14 July 1988	Syria	1–0	Kuwait

16 July 1988	Jordan	2–0	Syria

19 July 1988	Egypt	0–0	Syria

21 July 1988	Iraq	1–1	Syria

21 November 1988	Syria	0–2	Soviet Union	Syria

2 December 1988 1988 AFC Asian Cup	Saudi Arabia	2–0	Syria	Doha, Qatar
	Al-Mutlaq 20'; Al-Suwaiyed 82'	(Report)		Stadium: Qatar SC Stadium; Referee: Erik Fredriksson (Sweden)

4 December 1988 1988 AFC Asian Cup	China	3–0	Syria	Doha, Qatar
	Gao Sheng 13'; Xie Yuxin 14', 19'	(Report)		Stadium: Qatar SC Stadium; Referee: Mohamed Hansal (Algeria)

8 December 1988 1988 AFC Asian Cup	Syria	1–0	Kuwait	Doha, Qatar
	Al-Nasser 63'	(Report)		Stadium: Al-Ahly Stadium; Referee: Yusuf Namoğlu (Turkey)

11 December 1988 1988 AFC Asian Cup	Syria	1–0	Bahrain	Doha, Qatar
	Abu Al-Sel 72' (pen.)	(Report)		Stadium: Qatar SC Stadium; Referee: Michel Vautrot (France)

1989	Syria	3–2	Jordan	Syria

10 March 1989	North Yemen	0–1	Syria

15 March 1989	Saudi Arabia	5–4	Syria

25 March 1989	Syria	2–0	North Yemen

30 March 1989	Syria	0–0	Saudi Arabia

=== 1990s ===
1992	Syria	1–0	Jordan

14 May 1992	Kuwait	0–0	Syria

17 May 1992	United Arab Emirates	2–0	Syria

20 May 1992	United Arab Emirates	0–0	Syria

29 May 1992 1992 AFC Asian Cup qualification	Qatar	4–2	Syria	Doha, Qatar

2 June 1992 1992 AFC Asian Cup qualification	Syria	1–0	Oman	Doha, Qatar

9 September 1992 1992 Arab Nations Cup	Syria	1–1	Saudi Arabia

11 September 1992 1992 Arab Nations Cup	Syria	0–0	Palestine

17 September 1992 1992 Arab Nations Cup	Syria	1–2	Kuwait

1993	Syria	1–1	Jordan

1993	Syria	2–3	Jordan

2 March 1993	Jordan	1–1	Syria

16 March 1993	Kuwait	2–1	Syria

23 June 1993 1994 FIFA World Cup qualification	Syria	2–0	Chinese Taipei

25 June 1993 1994 FIFA World Cup qualification	Oman	0–0	Syria

27 June 1993 1994 FIFA World Cup qualification	Iran	1–1	Syria

2 July 1993 1994 FIFA World Cup qualification	Syria	8–1	Chinese Taipei

4 July 1993 1994 FIFA World Cup qualification	Syria	2–1	Oman

7 July 1993 1994 FIFA World Cup qualification	Syria	1–1	Iran

1995	Jordan	1–3	Syria

1995	Syria	2–0	Jordan

31 March 1995	Syria	1–2	Egypt

9 July 1995	Syria	0–0	Egypt

1996	Syria	2–1	Bahrain

5 March 1996	Syria	0–2	Kuwait

23 March 1996	Kuwait	3–1	Syria

21 June 1996 1996 AFC Asian Cup qualification	Syria	2–0	Kazakhstan	Damascus, Syria
	Taleb 21'; M. Sheikh-Dib 34'			Stadium: Abbasiyyin Stadium; Attendance: 20,000; Referee: Fahed Al-Damisi (Jordan)

28 June 1996 1996 AFC Asian Cup qualification	Qatar	1–0	Syria	Doha, Qatar
	Al-Enazi 35'			Stadium: Khalifa Stadium; Referee: Ali Bujsaim (UAE)

12 July 1996 1996 AFC Asian Cup qualification	Kazakhstan	0–1	Syria	Almaty, Kazakhstan
			Al Boushi 9'	Stadium: Central Stadium; Attendance: 5,000; Referee: Nik Ahmad Yaakub (Malaysia)

19 July 1996 1996 AFC Asian Cup qualification	Syria	3–1	Qatar	Damascus, Syria
	Helou 17'; M. Sheikh-Dib 48'; Khalifa 76' (pen.)		Al-Enazi 58'	Stadium: Abbasiyyin Stadium; Attendance: 20,000; Referee: Hossein Askari (Iran)

25 September 1996	Syria	1–2	Sudan

29 September 1996	Syria	1–0	Sudan

16 November 1996	Saudi Arabia	3–1	Syria

19 November 1996	Kuwait	2–2	Syria

26 November 1996	United Arab Emirates	1–1	Syria

28 November 1996	United Arab Emirates	1–0	Syria

6 December 1996 1996 AFC Asian Cup	Japan	2–1	Syria	United Arab Emirates

9 December 1996 1996 AFC Asian Cup	China	3–0	Syria	United Arab Emirates

12 December 1996 1996 AFC Asian Cup	Syria	2–1	Uzbekistan	United Arab Emirates

1997	Jordan	0–0	Syria	Jordan

1997	Syria	0–0	Jordan	Syria

2 March 1997	Saudi Arabia	3–0	Syria

4 March 1997	Saudi Arabia	1–1	Syria

30 April 1997	Syria	1–1	Libya

4 June 1997 1998 FIFA World Cup qualification	Syria	12–0	Maldives	Damascus, Syria
	Bayazid 7', 14'; Jokhadar 10', 37', 89'; Rifai 11'; Jabban 13'; Srour 32'; Al Zaher 50'; Boushi 71', 78'; Kurdughli 77'	Report		Stadium: Abbasiyyin Stadium; Attendance: 8,000; Referee: Gajendra Man Singh

6 June 1997 1998 FIFA World Cup qualification	Syria	0–1	Iran	Damascus, Syria
		Report	Daei 65'	Stadium: Abbasiyyin Stadium; Attendance: 33,000; Referee: Masayoshi Okada

11 June 1997 1998 FIFA World Cup qualification	Kyrgyzstan	2–1	Syria	Tehran, Iran
	Sardarov 77'; Kutsov 90'	Report	Boushi 85'	Stadium: Azadi Stadium; Attendance: 50,000

13 June 1997 1998 FIFA World Cup qualification	Iran	2–2	Syria	Tehran, Iran
	Shahroudi 10'; Mansourian 29'	Report	Boushi 12'; Bayazid 40'	Stadium: Azadi Stadium; Attendance: 1000,000; Referee: Mohamed Nazri Abdullah

14 July 1997 1997 Pan Arab Games group stage	Syria	3–1	UAE Emirates U21	Tripoli, Lebanon
	Bayazid 18', 52'; Taleb 44'	Report	El Ballouchi 49'	Stadium: Tripoli Municipal Stadium

16 July 1997 1997 Pan Arab Games group stage	Syria	2–1	Kuwait B	Tripoli, Lebanon
	Jokhadar 67', 80'	Report	Azis 85'	Stadium: Tripoli Municipal Stadium

20 July 1997 1997 Pan Arab Games group stage	Syria	1–0	Mauritania	Damascus, Syria
				Stadium: Abbasiyyin Stadium

24 July 1997 1997 Pan Arab Games semi-finals	Lebanon	2–3 (a.e.t.)	Syria	Beirut, Lebanon
	Chehab 22' (pen.), 79' (pen.)	Report	Bayazid 77'; Karapetyan 85' (o.g.); Jabban 100'	Stadium: Camille Chamoun Stadium; Attendance: 40,000; Referee: Mohammed Abdallah

27 July 1997 1997 Pan Arab Games final	Jordan	1–0	Syria	Beirut, Lebanon
	Tadrus 84'	Report		Stadium: Camille Chamoun Stadium; Attendance: 25,000

2 July 1998 Friendly	Oman	1–2	Syria	Oman

20 July 1998 1998 Arab Nations Cup qualification	Syria	3–0	Jordan	Lebanon

23 July 1998 1998 Arab Nations Cup qualification	Syria	2–1	Palestine	Lebanon

26 July 1998 1998 Arab Nations Cup qualification	Lebanon	0–1	Syria	Lebanon

12 September 1998 Friendly	Syria	3–0	Oman	Damascus, Syria
	Rihawi 1'; Bayazid 21'; Mahmalji 72'	Report		Stadium: Abbasiyyin Stadium; Attendance: 5,000

15 September 1998 Friendly	Oman	0–0	Syria	Damascus, Syria
		Report		Stadium: Abbasiyyin Stadium

18 September 1998 Friendly	Bahrain	2–0	Syria	Manama, Bahrain
	Youssouf Al Sa'adi 17'; Abdulrazzaq Mohamed 55'	Report		Stadium: Al Ahli Stadium; Attendance: 2,500

22 September 1998 1998 Arab Cup	Egypt U21	2–1	Syria	Doha, Qatar
	Rajab 37'; Al-Doumani 44'	Report	Mahmalji 67'	Stadium: Jassim Bin Hamad Stadium; Attendance: 15,000; Referee: Omar Al-Mehanna (Saudi Arabia)

26 September 1998 1998 Arab Cup	Kuwait	4–0	Syria	Doha, Qatar
	Al Houwaidi 10'; Abdullah 23'; Al-Saleh 35'; Bakhit 57'	Report		Stadium: Jassim Bin Hamad Stadium; Attendance: 7,000; Referee: Salah Ahmed (Sudan)

17 October 1998 1998 Friendship Tournament	Lebanon	3–3	Syria	Abu Dhabi, United Arab Emirates
	Ghazarian 28'; Shouweikh 48' (pen.); Al Indari 67'	Report	Jabban 30'; Al Homsi 39'; Bayazid (?)	Stadium: Al Nahyan Stadium; Referee: Ali Bujsaim (United Arab Emirates)

19 October 1998 1998 Friendship Tournament	United Arab Emirates	1–0	Syria	Abu Dhabi, United Arab Emirates
	Saeed 23'	Report		Stadium: Al Nahyan Stadium; Referee: Gamal Al-Ghandour (Egypt)

21 October 1998 1998 Friendship Tournament	Syria	3–2	Sudan	United Arab Emirates
		Report

16 July 1999 Friendly	Jordan	1–0	Syria	Jordan

18 July 1999 Friendly	Jordan	4–0	Syria	Jordan

19 August 1999 1999 Pan Arab Games group stage	Oman	1–1	Syria	Jordan
	Al-Dhabit 61'		Afash 11'; Haj Moustafa (red card) 61'

23 August 1999 1999 Pan Arab Games group stage	Libya	1–1	Syria	Amman, Jordan
	Muntasser 50'		Afash 40'	Stadium: Amman International Stadium; Attendance: 6,000

25 August 1999 1999 Pan Arab Games group stage	Syria	2–2	United Arab Emirates	Amman, Jordan
	Al-Sayed 35'; Afash 54'		Ali 33'; Harib 80'	Stadium: Amman International Stadium

27 August 1999 1999 Pan Arab Games group stage	Palestine	1–1	Syria	Amman, Jordan
	Al-Kord 82'		Al-Sayed 19'	Stadium: Amman International Stadium; Attendance: 8,000; Referee: (Yemen) Abdulwaheed Al-Khamisi

== See also ==
- Syria national football team results (2000–2009)
- Syria national football team results (2010–2019)
- Syria national football team results (2020–present)
