= 1984 AFC Asian Cup qualification =

Tournament details
- Dates: 6 August 1984 – 28 October 1984
- Teams: 21 (from 1 confederation)

Tournament statistics
- Matches played: 36
- Goals scored: 185 (5.14 per match)

The qualification for the 1984 AFC Asian Cup consisted of 21 teams in four groups. Eight teams from the top two of each group advance to the final tournament, joining hosts Singapore and defending champions Kuwait.

== Groups ==
North Korea was banned from international competitions for two years by the AFC and FIFA for attacking a referee after the 1982 Asian Games football semi-final match against Kuwait in New Delhi, India.

Group 1	Group 2	Group 3	Group 4
Bangladesh; ~~Burma~~ * Indonesia; Iran; Philippines; Thailand; Syria	India**; Malaysia**; Nepal; Oman; Saudi Arabia; Sri Lanka; United Arab Emirates	~~Bahrain~~ * ~~Japan~~ * ~~Lebanon~~ * ~~Macau~~ * Pakistan; North Yemen; South Korea	Afghanistan; China; ~~Brunei~~ * Hong Kong; ~~Iraq~~ * Jordan; Qatar; ~~South Yemen~~ *

- * Withdrew
- ** Moved to Group 3
- Kuwait qualified as defending champions
- Singapore qualified as host

== Qualification ==
=== Group 1 ===
All matches played in Indonesia.

Pos	Team	Pld	W	D	L	GF	GA	GD	Pts	Qualification
1	Iran	5	5	0	0	21	2	+19	10	1984 AFC Asian Cup
2	Syria	5	3	0	2	9	8	+1	6	1984 AFC Asian Cup
3	Indonesia	5	3	0	2	6	5	+1	6	
4	Thailand	5	3	0	2	9	10	−1	6	
5	Bangladesh	5	1	0	4	6	13	−7	2	
6	Philippines	5	0	0	5	3	16	−13	0	

6 August 1984
19:15 (UTC+7)

Indonesia	2–1	Thailand
Irmis 74'; Bolung 90'	Report	Suttabun 26'

Senayan Stadium, Jakarta
Referee: Cheung Kwok Kui (Hong Kong)

7 August 1984
18:00 (UTC+7)

Syria	2–0	Philippines
El-Sibai 42'; Madarati 60'	Report

Senayan Stadium, Jakarta
7 August 1984
20:00 (UTC+7)

Iran	5–0	Bangladesh
Mohammadkhani 65', 78', 81', 89'; Alidoosti 90'	Report

Senayan Stadium, Jakarta
Attendance: 5,000
Referee: Nadasen Chandra (Singapore)

9 August 1984
18:00 (UTC+7)

Indonesia	2–1	Bangladesh
Irmis 31', 58'	Report	Aslam 89'

Senayan Stadium, Jakarta
Referee: Maidin Bin Singah (Singapore)
9 August 1984
18:30 (UTC+7)

Iran	3–1	Syria
Alidoosti 3', 76'; Mohammadkhani 67'	Report	Radwan 4'

Sriwedari Stadium, Solo
Attendance: 10,000
Referee: Yu Jong-lin (North Korea)
9 August 1984
20:00 (UTC+7)

Thailand	3–0	Philippines
Pue-on 7', 34'; Suttabun 48'	Report

Senayan Stadium, Jakarta

11 August 1984
18:00 (UTC+7)

Syria	2–1	Bangladesh
El-Sil 6'; Madarati 89'	Report	Jasimuddin 44'

Senayan Stadium, Jakarta
Referee: Au Chi Shing (Hong Kong)
11 August 1984
18:30 (UTC+7)

Indonesia	1–0	Philippines
Meriem 18'	Report

Sriwedari Stadium, Solo
Attendance: 11,000
11 August 1984
20:00 (UTC+7)

Iran	5–0	Thailand
Me'mar 25'; Alidoosti 31', 81'; Mohammadkhani 55'; Darakhshan 63'	Report

Senayan Stadium, Jakarta
Referee: Kim Soo-duk (South Korea)

13 August 1984
18:00 (UTC+7)

Indonesia	0–1	Iran
	Report	Mohammadkhani 78'

Senayan Stadium, Jakarta
Referee: Yoo Jong-rin (South Korea)
13 August 1984
18:30 (UTC+7)

Bangladesh	3–2	Philippines
Iqbal 8', 49'; Aslam 42'	Report	Bedia 25', 58'

Sriwedari Stadium, Solo
Attendance: 7,000
13 August 1984
20:00 (UTC+7)

Thailand	3–2	Syria
Pirom 61'; Areesngarkul 72'; Hongkajohn 78'	Report	El-Sibai 9'; Kardaghli 84'

Senayan Stadium, Jakarta

15 August 1984
18:00 (UTC+7)

Iran	7–1	Philippines
Arabshahi 16'; Mohammadkhani 20', 52'; Alidoosti 48'; Ahadi 50', 89'; Mokhtarifar 77'	Report	Araneta 69'

Senayan Stadium, Jakarta
Attendance: 4,000
15 August 1984
18:30 (UTC+7)

Thailand	2–1	Bangladesh
Suttabun 24'; Areesngarkul 61'	Report	Aslam 23'

Sriwedari Stadium, Solo
Attendance: 7,500
Referee: Stephen Ovinis (Malaysia)
15 August 1984
20:00 (UTC+7)

Indonesia	1–2	Syria
Irmis 26'	Report	Kardaghli 77'; Radwan 80'

Senayan Stadium, Jakarta
Attendance: 65,000
Referee: Maidin Bin Singah (Singapore)

Additional playoff (purpose unclear)

18 August 1984
18:00 (UTC+7)

Iran	1–0	Syria
Alidoosti 13'	Report

Senayan Stadium, Jakarta
Attendance: 40,000
Referee: Kim Soo-duk (Korea Republic)

=== Group 2 ===
All matches played in Saudi Arabia.

Pos	Team	Pld	W	D	L	GF	GA	GD	Pts	Qualification
1	Saudi Arabia	4	4	0	0	19	0	+19	8	1984 AFC Asian Cup
2	United Arab Emirates	4	3	0	1	24	2	+22	6	1984 AFC Asian Cup
3	Sri Lanka	4	1	1	2	6	11	−5	3	
4	Oman	4	1	1	2	9	15	−6	3	
5	Nepal	4	0	0	4	0	30	−30	0	

19 October 1984
19:40 (UTC+3)

Saudi Arabia	7–0	Nepal
Abdeljawad 22', 89'; Abdullah 37'; Al-Dosari 63'; Al-Jam'an 73', 86'; Al-Nafisah 83'	Report

Prince Abdullah Al-Faisal Stadium, Jeddah
Attendance: 13,538
Referee: Maidin Bin Singah (Singapore)

20 October 1984
20:10 (UTC+3)

Oman	1–1	Sri Lanka
Darwish 46'	Report	Mahinda 56'

Prince Abdullah Al-Faisal Stadium, Jeddah
Attendance: 1,632
Referee: Melyvn D'Souza (India)

22 October 1984
21:21 (UTC+3)

Sri Lanka	4–0	Nepal
Premlal 15', 40'; Breman 25'; Mullaje 84'	Report

Prince Abdullah Al-Faisal Stadium, Jeddah
Attendance: 4,864
Referee: Jassim Mandi (Bahrain)
22 October 1984
22:10 (UTC+3)

Saudi Arabia	1–0	United Arab Emirates
Abdullah 42' (pen.)	Report

Prince Abdullah Al-Faisal Stadium, Jeddah
Attendance: 9,728
Referee: Syed Shahid Hakim (India)

24 October 1984
19:40 (UTC+3)

Saudi Arabia	5–0	Sri Lanka
Abdullah 3', 8', 55'; Al-Jam'an 65'; Shakor 70'	Report

Prince Abdullah Al-Faisal Stadium, Jeddah
Attendance: 7,097
Referee: Soetoyo Hartasardjono (Indonesia)
24 October 1984
21:30 (UTC+3)

United Arab Emirates	8–0	Oman
Al Talyani; Khamees	Report

Prince Abdullah Al-Faisal Stadium, Jeddah
Attendance: 3,548
Referee: Othman Omar (Malaysia)

26 October 1984
19:40 (UTC+3)

Saudi Arabia	6–0	Oman
Abdullah 14', 24', 44' (pen.); Al-Nafisah 30', 71'; Khamees 81'	Report

Prince Abdullah Al-Faisal Stadium, Jeddah
Attendance: 5,929
Referee: Jassim Mandi (Bahrain)
26 October 1984
21:30 (UTC+3)

United Arab Emirates	11–0	Nepal
Al Talyani; Khamees	Report

Prince Abdullah Al-Faisal Stadium, Jeddah
Attendance: 2,965
Referee: Maidin Bin Singah (Singapore)

28 October 1984
19:40 (UTC+3)

Oman	8–0	Nepal
Khamis; Amaan; Darwish	Report

Prince Abdullah Al-Faisal Stadium, Jeddah
Attendance: 592
Referee: Syed Shahid Hakim (India)
28 October 1984
21:30 (UTC+3)

United Arab Emirates	5–1	Sri Lanka
Khamees; Al Talyani	Report	Balendran 70'

Prince Abdullah Al-Faisal Stadium, Jeddah
Attendance: 592
Referee: Soetoyo Hartasardjono (Indonesia)

=== Group 3 ===
All matches played in India.

Pos	Team	Pld	W	D	L	GF	GA	GD	Pts	Qualification
1	South Korea	4	3	1	0	13	0	+13	7	1984 AFC Asian Cup
2	India	4	3	0	1	8	2	+6	6	1984 AFC Asian Cup
3	Malaysia	4	2	1	1	10	3	+7	5	
4	Pakistan	4	1	0	3	4	14	−10	2	
5	North Yemen	4	0	0	4	2	18	−16	0	

10 October 1984
14:30 (UTC+5:30)

South Korea	6–0	North Yemen
Park Sung-hwa 29', 34' (pen.) (?); Chung Hae-won 45', 70'	Report

Salt Lake Stadium, Calcutta
Referee: Mohammad Salehye (Iran)

11 October 1984
14:30 (UTC+5:30)

Malaysia	5–0	Pakistan
Abidin 45', 59'; Yusof 57' (?); Lim Teong Kim (?)	Report

Salt Lake Stadium, Calcutta
Referee: Hamed Hamdan Abdullah As Said (Oman)

12 October 1984
14:30 (UTC+5:30)

India	4–0	North Yemen
Dey (?); Shabbir (?); Banerjee (?); Mani (?)	Report

Salt Lake Stadium, Calcutta
Referee: Cui Baoyin (China)

13 October 1984
14:30 (UTC+5:30)

South Korea	6–0	Pakistan
Lee Tae-ho 10'; Choi Sang-kook 15'; Park Sung-hwa (?); Wang Seon-jae (?)	Report

Salt Lake Stadium, Calcutta
Referee: Marwan Arafat (Syria)

14 October 1984
14:30 (UTC+5:30)

India	2–1	Malaysia
Thapa (?); Mani (?)	Report	Abidin (?)

Salt Lake Stadium, Calcutta
Referee: Abdul A. Karim (Bahrain)

15 October 1984
14:30 (UTC+5:30)

Pakistan	4–1	North Yemen
Sharafat 3', 18', 74'; Shahzada 10'	Report	Nasser 7' (pen.)

Salt Lake Stadium, Calcutta
Referee: Zhong Bohong (China)

16 October 1984
14:30 (UTC+5:30)

South Korea	0–0	Malaysia
	Report

Salt Lake Stadium, Calcutta
Referee: Abdul Salam Al Yaqoot (Kuwait)

17 October 1984
14:30 (UTC+5:30)

India	2–0	Pakistan
Shabbir 24', 82'	Report

Salt Lake Stadium, Calcutta
Referee: Marwan Arafat (Syria)

18 October 1984
14:30 (UTC+5:30)

Malaysia	4–1	North Yemen
Abidin (?); Gunasegaran (?); Mahmud (?)	Report

Salt Lake Stadium, Calcutta
Referee: Cui Baoyin (China)

19 October 1984
14:30 (UTC+5:30)

India	0–1	South Korea
	Report	Park Chang-sun 48'

Salt Lake Stadium, Calcutta
Referee: Hamed Hamdan Abdullah As Said (Oman)

=== Group 4 ===
All matches played in China.

Pos	Team	Pld	W	D	L	GF	GA	GD	Pts	Qualification
1	China	4	4	0	0	15	0	+15	8	1984 AFC Asian Cup
2	Qatar	4	3	0	1	11	1	+10	6	1984 AFC Asian Cup
3	Jordan	4	1	1	2	7	10	−3	3	
4	Hong Kong	4	0	2	2	1	4	−3	2	
5	Afghanistan	4	0	1	3	1	20	−19	1	

10 September 1984
18:45 (UTC+8)

Qatar	8–0	Afghanistan
Al-Khater 11', 38'; Salman 16'; Khalfan 32', 33', 58'; Al-Sowaidi 56'; Al-Mehaizaa 85'	Report

Yuexiushan Stadium, Guangzhou
Attendance: 1,500
Referee: Yoshisato Okaya (Japan)
10 September 1984
20:45 (UTC+8)

Jordan	1–1	Hong Kong
Awad 35'	Report	Lai Wing Cheong 45'

Yuexiushan Stadium, Guangzhou
Attendance: 5,000
Referee: Subramaniam Kunalingam (Singapore)

12 September 1984
18:45 (UTC+8)

Qatar	1–0	Hong Kong
Al-Sowaidi 65'	Report

Guangdong Provincial People’s Stadium, Guangzhou
Attendance: 10,000
Referee: Reynaldo Reyes (Philippines)
12 September 1984
20:45 (UTC+8)

China	6–0	Afghanistan
Li Hui (?); Zhao Dayu; Li Huayun 64'; Zuo Shusheng 66'; Yang Zhaohui (?)	Report

Yuexiushan Stadium, Guangzhou
Attendance: 10,000

15 September 1984
18:45 (UTC+8)

China	6–0	Jordan
Li Huayun 12'; Gu Guangming 13'; Zhao Dayu (?); Li Hui (?); Yang Zhaohui 88'	Report

Yuexiushan Stadium, Guangzhou
Attendance: 15,000
Referee: Shizuo Takada (Japan)
15 September 1984
20:45 (UTC+8)

Hong Kong	0–0	Afghanistan
	Report

Yuexiushan Stadium, Guangzhou
Attendance: 20,000
Referee: Reinaldo Antonio Lourenco (Macau)

17 September 1984
18:45 (UTC+8)

China	2–0	Hong Kong
Zhao Dayu 59', 72' (pen.)	Report

Guangdong Provincial People’s Stadium, Guangzhou
Attendance: 18,000
Referee: Farid Abdulrahman Zainal (United Arab Emirates)
17 September 1984
20:45 (UTC+8)

Qatar	2–0	Jordan
Al-Barshi 31'; Al-Mohanadi 54'	Report

Guangdong Provincial People's Stadium, Guangzhou
Attendance: 20,000
Referee: Yoshisato Okaya (Japan)

20 September 1984
18:45 (UTC+8)

Jordan	6–1	Afghanistan
Ibrahim 35', 82'; Saddieh 46'; Awad 66', 89'; Dhyabat 68'	Report	Farooq 18'

Yuexiushan Stadium, Guangzhou
Attendance: 25,000
Referee: Reinaldo Antonio Lourenco (Macau)
20 September 1984
20:45 (UTC+8)

China	1–0	Qatar
Zhao Dayu 88'	Report

Yuexiushan Stadium, Guangzhou
Attendance: 20,000
Referee: Reynaldo Reyes (Philippines)

== Qualified teams ==
Team	Qualified as	Qualified on	Previous appearance
Singapore	Hosts	N/A	0 (debut)
Kuwait	1980 AFC Asian Cup champions	30 September 1980	3 (1972, 1976, 1980)
Iran	Group 1 winners	13 August 1984	4 (1968, 1972, 1976, 1980)
Syria	Group 1 runners-up	15 August 1984	1 (1980)
Saudi Arabia	Group 2 winners	26 October 1984	0 (debut)
United Arab Emirates	Group 2 runners-up	28 October 1984	1 (1980)
South Korea	Group 3 winners	19 October 1984	5 (1956, 1960, 1964, 1972, 1980)
India	Group 3 runners-up	17 October 1984	1 (1964)
China	Group 4 winners	17 September 1984	2 (1976, 1980)
Qatar	Group 4 runners-up	17 September 1984	1 (1980)

== Goal scorers ==
There were 185 goals scored in 36 matches, for an average of 5.14 goals per match.

9 goals

- (Iran) Nasser Mohammadkhani

8 goals

- (Saudi Arabia) Majed Abdullah
- (United Arab Emirates) Adnan Al Talyani

7 goals

- (Iran) Hamid Alidoosti
- (United Arab Emirates) Fahad Khamees

6 goals

- (China) Zhao Dayu
- (South Korea) Park Sung-hwa

5 goals

- (Malaysia) Zainal Abidin Hassan

4 goals

- (Indonesia) Sain Irmis

3 goals

- (Bangladesh) Sheikh Mohammad Aslam
- (China) Li Hui
- (India) Shabbir Ali
- (Pakistan) Sharafat Ali
- (Qatar) Ibrahim Khalfan
- (Saudi Arabia) Mohaisen Al-Jam'an
- (Saudi Arabia) Shaye Al-Nafisah
- (Thailand) Chalit Suttabun
- (Jordan) Khaled Khalil Awad
- (Oman) Darwish Ahmed
- (Oman) Ghulam Khamis
- (Oman) Younis Amaan

2 goals

- (Bangladesh) Khandoker Wasim Iqbal
- (China) Li Huayun
- (China) Yang Zhaohui
- (India) Babu Mani
- (Iran) Reza Ahadi
- (Malaysia) Abdul Nasir Yusof
- (Philippines) Elmer Bedia
- (Qatar) Mohammed Al-Sowaidi
- (Qatar) Mubarak Al-Khater
- (Saudi Arabia) Mohamed Abdeljawad
- (South Korea) Chung Hae-won
- (South Korea) Wang Seon-jae
- (Syria) Abdul Kader Kardaghli
- (Syria) Nabil El-Sibai
- (Syria) Radwan Al-Sheikh Hassan
- (Thailand) Piyapong Pue-on
- (Thailand) Thanis Areesngarkul
- (Jordan) Jamal Ibrahim

1 goal

- (Bangladesh) Kazi Jasimuddin Ahmed Joshi
- (China) Gu Guangming
- (China) Zuo Shusheng
- (Hong Kong) Lai Wing Cheong
- (Indonesia) Danny Bolung
- (Indonesia) Noah Meriem
- (India) Krishanu Dey
- (India) Narender Thapa
- (India) Prasanta Banerjee
- (Iran) Jaafar Mokhtarifar
- (Iran) Hamid Derakhshan
- (Iran) Mahmoud Me'mar
- (Iran) Zia Arabshahi
- (Malaysia) Kuppan Gunasegaran
- (Malaysia) Lim Teong Kim
- (Malaysia) Salim Mahmud
- (Yemen Arab Republic) Ahmed Nasser
- (Pakistan) Arbab Hayat Shahzada
- (Philippines) Mariano Araneta
- (Qatar) Khalid Salman
- (Qatar) Man'a Al-Barshi
- (Qatar) Mohammed Al-Mohanadi
- (Qatar) Saleh Al-Mehaizaa
- (Saudi Arabia) Saleh Khalifa Al-Dosari
- (Saudi Arabia) Sameer Abdul Shakor
- (Saudi Arabia) Yousef Khamees
- (South Korea) Choi Sang-kook
- (South Korea) Lee Tae-ho
- (South Korea) Park Chang-sun
- (Syria) Marwan Madarati
- (Syria) Waleed Abou El-Sil
- (Thailand) Chalee Pirom
- (Thailand) Chalor Hongkajohn
- (Jordan) Ibrahim Saddieh
- (Jordan) Najah Dhyabat
- (Afghanistan) Siddiq Farooq
