= Philippines national football team results (1980–1999) =

This is a list of the Philippines national football team results from 1980 to 1999.

== 1980 ==
22 March 1980 Summer Olympics qualification	Indonesia	4–0	Philippines	Kuala Lumpur, Malaysia
		Report		Attendance: 10,000

24 March 1980 Summer Olympics qualification	Japan	10–0	Philippines	Kuala Lumpur, Malaysia
	Yokoyama 8'; Kaneda 21'; Maeda 25'; Kishioku 43', 51'; Usui 44'; Hasegawa 59', 66'; Kimura 82'; Takahara 87'	Report

25 March 1980 Summer Olympics qualification	Brunei	2–0	Philippines	Kuala Lumpur, Malaysia
		Report

27 March 1980 Summer Olympics qualification	South Korea	8–0	Philippines	Kuala Lumpur, Malaysia
		Report

3 April 1980 Summer Olympics qualification	Malaysia	8–0	Philippines	Kuala Lumpur, Malaysia
		Report

== 1981 ==
14 August 1981 Jakarta Anniversary Tournament	Indonesia	3–0	Philippines	Jakarta, Indonesia

9 December 1981 Southeast Asian Games GS	Singapore	4–0	Philippines	Manila, Philippines
	Ahmad 32', 61'; R. Suriamurthi 42'

11 December 1981 Southeast Asian Games GS	Indonesia	2–0	Philippines	Manila, Philippines

== 1983 ==
30 May 1983 Southeast Asian Games GS	Philippines	0–0	Malaysia	Singapore
				Attendance: National Stadium

1 June 1983 Southeast Asian Games GS	Singapore	5–0	Philippines	Singapore
	Fandi Ahmad 2'; Salim Moin 32', 52', 64', 76'			Attendance: National Stadium

4 September 1984 Summer Olympics qualification	Japan	7–0	Philippines	Tokyo, Japan
14:00 (UTC+9)	Hiromi Hara 23'; Kimura 27', 76' (pen.); Kato 37'; Yokoyama 41'; Tanaka 48', 78'	Report		Stadium: National Stadium; Attendance: 9,000

7 September 1984 Summer Olympics qualification	Japan	10–1	Philippines	Tokyo, Japan
19:00 (UTC+9)	Unknown 3' (o.g.); Maeda 10'; Kimura 28', 35', 77', 82', 89'; Hiromi Hara 29'; Yokoyama 46'; Kaneda 73'	Report	Araneta 32'	Stadium: National Stadium; Attendance: 8,000

== 1984 ==
7 August 1984 AFC Asian Cup qualification	Syria	2–0	Philippines	Jakarta, Indonesia
	El-Sibai 42'; Madarati 60'			Stadium: Senayan Stadium

9 August 1984 AFC Asian Cup qualification	Thailand	3–0	Philippines	Jakarta, Indonesia
	Pue-On 7', 34'; Chalit 48'			Stadium: Senayan Stadium

11 August 1984 AFC Asian Cup qualification	Indonesia	1–0	Philippines	Solo, Indonesia
	Meriem 18'			Stadium: Sriwedari Stadium

13 August 1984 AFC Asian Cup qualification	Bangladesh	3–2	Philippines	Solo, Indonesia
	Iqbal 8', 49'; Aslam 42'		Bedia 25', 58'	Stadium: Sriwedari Stadium

15 August 1984 AFC Asian Cup qualification	Iran	7–1	Philippines	Jakarta, Indonesia
	Arabshai 16'; Mohammadkhani 20', 52'; Alidousti 48'; Ahadi 50', 89'; Mokhtarifar 77'		Araneta 69'	Stadium: Senayan Stadium; Attendance: 4,000

== 1985 ==
24 March 1985 Brunei Merdeka Games	Brunei	4–1	Philippines	Bandar Seri Begawan, Brunei
				Stadium: Hassanal Bolkiah National Stadium

10 December 1985 Southeast Asian Games GS	Malaysia	6–0	Philippines	Bangkok, Thailand
				Stadium: Suphachalasai Stadium

12 December 1985 Southeast Asian Games GS	Thailand	7–0	Philippines	Bangkok, Thailand
				Stadium: Suphachalasai Stadium

== 1987 ==
3 April 1988 Summer Olympics qualification	Philippines	0–5	Hong Kong	Hong Kong
		Report	Bredbury 10'; Lai Lan Kau; Chan Fat Chi; Ku Kam Fai; Lai Wing Cheong 89'

10 April 1988 Summer Olympics qualification	Philippines	0–9	China	Guangzhou, China
		Report	Ma Lin 1', 21', 59'; Li Hui 8', 66', 77' (pen.); Liu Haiguang 42'; Jia Xiuquan 82' (?)

13 April 1988 Summer Olympics qualification	China	10–0	Philippines	Guangzhou, China
	Ma Lin 21' (?); Unknown 22' (o.g.); Jia Xiuquan 24', 48', 84'; Mai Chao 40' (pen.), 75'; Liu Haiguang 86'	Report

14 May 1988 Summer Olympics qualification	Hong Kong	7–0	Philippines	Guangzhou, China
		Report

== 1989 ==
21 August 1989 Southeast Asian Games GS	Malaysia	3–0	Philippines	Kuala Lumpur, Malaysia
	A. Anbalagan 4', 41'; Muhamad Radhi Mat Din 28'

23 August 1989 Southeast Asian Games GS	Indonesia	5–1	Philippines	Kuala Lumpur, Malaysia
	I Made Pasek Wijaya 21'; Hanafing 59', 82'; Yacob 62'; Mustaqim 73'		Alicante 8'

25 August 1989 Southeast Asian Games GS	Brunei	2–0	Philippines	Kuala Lumpur, Malaysia

== 1991 ==
6 May 1991 Philippines International Cup	Philippines	2–1	Brunei	Iloilo City, Philippines
	Saluria 29'; N. Fegidero 48'	Report	Ahmad Ak. Momin 68' (pen.)	Stadium: Iloilo Sports Complex; Attendance: 5,000

12 May Friendly	Philippines	0–0	Brunei	Iloilo City, Philippines
		Report		Stadium: Iloilo Sports Complex

26 November 1991 Southeast Asian Games GS	Philippines	2–2	Vietnam	Manila, Philippines
	N. Fegidero (?); Rosell (?)		Nguyễn Văn Dũng (?)	Stadium: Rizal Memorial Stadium

28 November 1991 Southeast Asian Games GS	Philippines	1–0	Malaysia	Manila, Philippines
	N. Fegidero 84'			Stadium: Rizal Memorial Stadium

30 November 1991 Southeast Asian Games GS	Philippines	1–2	Indonesia	Manila, Philippines
	R. Piñero 17'		Hattu 67' (pen.); Putiray 87'	Stadium: Rizal Memorial Stadium

2 December 1991 Southeast Asian Games SF	Thailand	6–2	Philippines	Manila, Philippines
	Ronnachai 8', 18', 26', 36'; Vitoon 61'; Attaphol 77'		Bedia 45'; Rosell 89'	Stadium: Rizal Memorial Stadium

4 December 1991 Southeast Asian Games 3rd place	Philippines	0–2	Singapore	Manila, Philippines
				Stadium: Rizal Memorial Stadium

== 1993 ==
15 May 1993 Philippines International Cup	Philippines	1–0	Brunei	Bacolod, Philippines
	Piñero 33'	Report		Stadium: Paglaum Sports Complex

17 May 1993 Philippines International Cup 3rd place	Philippines	0–1	Brunei	Bacolod, Philippines
		Report	Said Abdullah 74'	Stadium: Paglaum Sports Complex; Attendance: 2,000

9 June 1993 Southeast Asian Games GS	Singapore	7–0	Philippines	Singapore
	Tan 21' (pen.); Fandi Ahmad 33', 58', 73', 76'; Malek Awab 41'; Rafi Ali 52'

11 June 1993 Southeast Asian Games GS	Vietnam	1–0	Philippines	Singapore
	Nguyen Van Long 66'

15 June 1993 Southeast Asian Games GS	Indonesia	3–1	Philippines	Singapore
	Maro 21' (o.g.); Hanafing 41' (pen.); Hamus 90+7'		Del Rosario 85'

== 1995 ==
4 December 1995 Southeast Asian Games GS	Myanmar	4–1	Philippines	Lamphun, Thailand
	Go Ku 3', 23'; Myo Hlaing Win 29'; Kyaw Noo Ra 70'		Rosell 78'

6 December 1995 Southeast Asian Games GS	Laos	1–0	Philippines	Lamphun, Thailand
	Maicompiuto (-)

8 December 1995 Southeast Asian Games GS	Singapore	4–0	Philippines	Chiang Mai, Thailand
	Lyaw Kee Noe 14', 21'; Gilmas 78'; Andy Ahmad 88'

12 December 1995 Southeast Asian Games GS	Philippines	1–0	Brunei	Lamphun, Thailand
	Rosell (?)

== 1996 ==
30 January 1996 AFC Asian Cup qualification	Hong Kong	8–0	Philippines	Hong Kong
	Chan Tsi-Kong 3', 80'; Bredbury 39', 42'; Lee Kin-Wo 59'; Wai Kwai-Lung 82', 83'; Santos 90'			Stadium: Mong Kok Stadium; Referee: Anh Bong-ki (South Korea)

1 February 1996 AFC Asian Cup qualification	Philippines	0–7	China	Hong Kong
			Hao Haidong 17', 58', 63'; Ma Mingyu 60'; Su Maozhen 77', 87'; Gao Feng 83'	Stadium: Mong Kok Stadium; Referee: Sophon Mhaboon (Thailand)

4 February 1996 AFC Asian Cup qualification	Macau	5–1	Philippines	Hong Kong
	Paulo 2'; José Martins 63', 52'; Cho Chi-Man 64'; Pinto 82'		Kalalang 63'	Stadium: Mong Kok Stadium; Referee: Anh Bong-ki (South Korea)

2 September 1996 AFF Championship GS	Philippines	0–5	Thailand	Singapore
			Phithaya 10', 38'; Kiatisuk 14'; Netipong 40'; Yutthana 60'	Stadium: Jurong Stadium; Attendance: 2,800

4 September 1996 AFF Championship GS	Malaysia	7–0	Philippines	Singapore
	Sanbagamaran 36', 61', 89'; Adnan 43'; Shamsurin 53', 81'; Chandran 78'			Stadium: National Stadium; Attendance: 1,000

6 September 1996 AFF Championship GS	Singapore	3–0	Philippines	Singapore
	Fandi 20', 42'; Lim Tong Hai 73'			Stadium: National Stadium; Attendance: 12,000

8 September 1996 AFF Championship GS	Brunei	1–0	Philippines	Singapore
	Irwan 28'			Stadium: National Stadium; Attendance: 3,000

21 September 1998 FIFA World Cup qualification	India	2–0	Philippines	Doha, Qatar
	Vijayan 81'; Coutinho 85'	Report		Stadium: Khalifa International Stadium; Attendance: 700; Referee: Omar Ali Al Shughair (Saudi Arabia)

23 September 1998 FIFA World Cup qualification	Qatar	5–0	Philippines	Doha, Qatar
	Al-Enazi 19', 41'; Soufi 29'; Al Noobi 30'; Jaloof 38'	Report		Stadium: Khalifa International Stadium; Attendance: 800; Referee: Muhammad Sahib (Iraq)

26 September 1998 FIFA World Cup qualification	Philippines	0–3	Sri Lanka	Doha, Qatar
		Report	Steinwall 28'; Perera 55', 80'	Stadium: Khalifa International Stadium; Attendance: 200; Referee: Kurmanbek Ordabayev (Kazakhstan)

== 1997 ==
23 February 1997 President's Cup 3rd place	Philippines	1–1 (3–4 p)	Cambodia	Iloilo City, Philippines
	Del Rosario 36'	Report	Kiri 6'	Stadium: Iloilo Sports Complex

7 October 1997 Southeast Asian Games GS	Malaysia	4–0	Philippines	Jakarta, Indonesia
	Sukiman; Mohammed; Adnan; Mohd Noor			Stadium: Senayan Stadium

9 October 1997 Southeast Asian Games GS	Laos	4–1	Philippines	Jakarta, Indonesia
	Thammavongsa; Channiphone; Maunggca (o.g.) unknown		N. Fegidero	Stadium: Senayan Stadium

12 October 1997 Southeast Asian Games GS	Indonesia	2–0	Philippines	Jakarta, Indonesia
	Uston; Kurniawan			Stadium: Senayan Stadium

14 October 1997 Southeast Asian Games GS	Vietnam	3–0	Philippines	Jakarta, Indonesia
	Trieu Quang Ha; Lê Huỳnh Đức; Nguyen Cong Vinh			Stadium: Senayan Stadium

27 November Friendly	Philippines	0–1	Estonia	Manila, Philippines
		Report	Kristal 46'	Stadium: Rizal Memorial Stadium; Attendance: 3,000; Referee: Jerry Andres (Philippines)

== 1998 ==
24 March 1998 AFF Championship qualification	Singapore	1–0	Philippines	Singapore
	Daimon	Report		Stadium: Jurong Stadium

26 March 1998 AFF Championship qualification	Cambodia	1–1	Philippines	Singapore
		Report	N. Fegidero '86'	Stadium: Jurong Stadium

27 August 1998 AFF Championship GS	Indonesia	3–0	Philippines	Ho Chi Minh City, Vietnam
	Altivo 12' (o.g.); Bima 41'; Uston 64'	Report		Stadium: Thống Nhất Stadium; Attendance: 15,000

29 August 1998 AFF Championship GS	Thailand	3–1	Philippines	Ho Chi Minh City, Vietnam
	Worrawoot 19'; Piandit 57'; Pansan 87'	Report	Gonzalez 32'	Stadium: Thống Nhất Stadium; Attendance: 15,000

31 August 1998 AFF Championship GS	Myanmar	5–2	Philippines	Ho Chi Minh City, Vietnam
	Win Htaik 22'; Myo Hlaing Win 42', 85'; Aung Khine 75', 79'	Report	Gonzalez 25', 33'	Stadium: Thống Nhất Stadium; Attendance: 12,000

== 1999 ==
30 July 1999 Southeast Asian Games GS	Thailand	9–0	Philippines	Bandar Seri Begawan, Brunei
	Anuruck Srikerd 6'; Kiatisuk Senamuang 35' (pen.), 38', 65', 93'; Surachai Jaturapattarapong 46'; Sakesan Pituratana 47'; Choketawee Promrut 84'; Worrawoot Srimaka 89'	Report		Stadium: Berakas Track and Field Complex; Referee: Zulkifle Haji Duraman (Brunei)

1 August 1999 Southeast Asian Games GS	Myanmar	4–1	Philippines	Bandar Seri Begawan, Brunei
	Myo Hlaing Win 26', 41', 68'; Win Htaik 53'	Report	Piñero 18'	Stadium: Berakas Sports Complex; Attendance: 2,000; Referee: Mohd Abdullah (Brunei)

3 August 1999 Southeast Asian Games GS	Philippines	2–3	Laos	Bandar Seri Begawan, Brunei
	N. Fegidero 42'; Piñero 68'	Report	Thamavongsa 56'; Soubinh 57'; Louang-Amath 71'	Stadium: Berakas Sports Complex; Attendance: 500; Referee: Serang Muchilis (Indonesia)

8 August 1999 Southeast Asian Games GS	Philippines	0–2	Vietnam	Bandar Seri Begawan, Brunei
		Report	Dang Phuong Nam 44', 49'	Stadium: Berakas Track and Field Complex; Attendance: 500; Referee: Mohd Abdullah (Brunei)
