= Jordan national football team results (1980–1989) =

- Win Draw Loss

This article provides details of international football games played by the Jordan national football team from 1980 to 1989.

== Results by year ==
Year	GP	W	D	L	Win %
1980	9	2	1	6	22.22
1981	8	2	0	6	25.00
1982	2	0	0	2	0.00
1983	9	0	1	8	0.00
1984	5	2	1	2	40.00
1985	10	1	1	8	10.00
1987	8	2	3	3	25.00
1988	20	8	6	6	40.00
1989	4	1	1	2	25.00
Total	75	18	14	43	24.00

== Matches ==
=== 1980 ===
6 February Friendly	United Arab Emirates	3–1	Jordan	United Arab Emirates
		Report

8 February Friendly	United Arab Emirates	1–1	Jordan	United Arab Emirates
		Report

15 February Friendly	Syria	1–2	Jordan	Syria
		Report

16 March 1980 Summer Olympics qualification	Iraq	4–0	Jordan	Baghdad, Iraq
	Ahmed 18', 52'; Jassim 62'; Saeed 75'	Report		Stadium: Al-Shaab Stadium

22 March 1980 Summer Olympics qualification	Syria	2–0	Jordan	Baghdad, Iraq
		Report		Stadium: Al-Shaab Stadium

26 March 1980 Summer Olympics qualification	South Yemen	2–1	Jordan	Baghdad, Iraq
		Report		Stadium: Al-Shaab Stadium

29 March 1980 Summer Olympics qualification	Kuwait	1–0	Jordan	Baghdad, Iraq
		Report		Stadium: Al-Shaab Stadium

6 September Friendly	Qatar	0–1	Jordan	Qatar
		Report

8 September Friendly	Qatar	3–0	Jordan	Qatar
		Report

=== 1981 ===
6 February Friendly	Jordan	0–2	Iraq	Jordan
		Report

8 February Friendly	Jordan	0–2	Iraq	Jordan
		Report

14 February Friendly	Oman	0–1	Jordan	Oman
		Report

16 February Friendly	Oman	0–2	Jordan	Oman
		Report

27 February Friendly	Bahrain	1–0	Jordan	Bahrain
		Report

1 March Friendly	Bahrain	1–0	Jordan	Bahrain
		Report

11 March Friendly	Saudi Arabia	2–1	Jordan	Saudi Arabia
		Report

14 March Friendly	Saudi Arabia	2–0	Jordan	Saudi Arabia
		Report

=== 1982 ===
19 February Friendly	Iraq	3–1	Jordan	Iraq
		Report

21 February Friendly	Iraq	7–1	Jordan	Iraq
		Report

=== 1983 ===
17 April Friendly	Sierra Leone	2–1	Jordan	Freetown, Sierra Leone
		Report

12 August 1984 Summer Olympics qualification	Syria	3–2	Jordan	Damascus, Syria
		Report

26 August 1984 Summer Olympics qualification	Jordan	0–1	Syria	Amman, Jordan
		Report

8 September 1984 Summer Olympics qualification	Qatar	2–1	Jordan	Doha, Qatar
	Muftah 45', 83'	Report	Salama 4'

15 September 1984 Summer Olympics qualification	Kuwait	3–0	Jordan	Kuwait City, Kuwait
		Report

14 October 1984 Summer Olympics qualification	Jordan	0–0	Qatar	Amman, Jordan
		Report

21 October 1984 Summer Olympics qualification	Jordan	0–2	Kuwait	Amman, Jordan
		Report

23 December Friendly	Jordan	1–3	Egypt	Amman, Jordan
		Report

25 December Friendly	Jordan	1–3	Egypt	Amman, Jordan
		Report

=== 1984 ===
18 May 1985 Arab Cup qualification	Jordan	3–2 (a.e.t.)	Iraq	Amman, Jordan
	Abu-Ahed 51'; Ibrahim 68'; Awad 93'	Report	Saeed 43', 75'	Stadium: Amman International Stadium
Note: Jordan and Iraq qualified due to the withdrawal of the other teams in the group.

10 September 1984 Asian Cup qualification	Jordan	1–1	Hong Kong	Guangzhou, China
	Awad 35'	Report	Lai Wing-Cheong 45'

15 September 1984 Asian Cup qualification	China	6–0	Jordan	Guangzhou, China
	Li Huayun 12'; Gu Guangming 13'; Zhao Dayu; Li Hui; Yang Zhaohui 88'	Report

17 September 1984 Asian Cup qualification	Qatar	2–0	Jordan	Guangzhou, China
	Al-Barshi 31'; Al-Mohanadi 54'	Report

20 September 1984 Asian Cup qualification	Jordan	6–1	Afghanistan	Guangzhou, China
		Report

=== 1985 ===
15 March 1986 World Cup qualification first round	Jordan	1–0	Qatar	Amman, Jordan
	Saleh 83'	Report		Stadium: Amman International Stadium; Referee: Abuwahid Shambe Al-Baluchi (Oman)

29 March 1986 World Cup qualification first round	Jordan	2–3	Iraq	Amman, Jordan
	Al-Dawud (?); Abu Abed (?)	Report	Munir (?); Radhi (?); Saeed (?)	Stadium: Amman International Stadium; Referee: Abdulaziz Saleh Al-Salmi (Kuwait)

3 April Friendly	Malta	3–1	Jordan	Ta'Qali, Malta
	Xuereb 57', 67' (pen.), 80'	Report		Stadium: Ta' Qali National Stadium; Attendance: 399; Referee: Charles Scerri (Malta)

12 April 1986 World Cup qualification first round	Qatar	2–0	Jordan	Doha, Qatar
	Zaid 53'; Malalla 78'	Report		Referee: Mohamed Sanhoub (Yemen)

19 April 1986 World Cup qualification first round	Iraq	2–0	Jordan	Kuwait City, Kuwait
	Radhi 46'; * Allawi 50'	Report		Referee: Jamal Al-Sharif (Syria)

26 June Friendly	Bahrain	5–2	Jordan	Bahrain
		Report

3 July 1985 Arab Cup Group B	Saudi Arabia	4–0	Jordan	Taif, Saudi Arabia
	Nu'eimeh 45'; Azmi 49' (o.g.); Al-Musaibeah 58'; Al-Bishi	Report		Stadium: King Fahd Stadium; Referee: Nizar Watti (Syria)

5 July 1985 Arab Cup Group B	Qatar	2–0	Jordan	Taif, Saudi Arabia
	Khalfan 32'; Muftah 66'	Report		Stadium: King Fahd Stadium; Referee: Belaïd Lacarne (Algeria)

10 October Friendly	Syria	2–0	Jordan	Syria
		Report

18 October Friendly	Jordan	0–0	Mexico	Amman, Jordan
		Report

=== 1987 ===
27 February Friendly	Syria	1–1	Jordan	Syria
		Report

17 March Friendly	Bahrain	0–1	Jordan	Bahrain
		Report

20 March Friendly	Bahrain	0–0	Jordan	Bahrain
		Report

25 March Friendly	Jordan	2–1	Cyprus	Jordan
		Report

3 April 1988 Summer Olympics qualification	Jordan	1–1	United Arab Emirates	Amman, Jordan
	Abdul Karim Shadafan 83'	Report	Ali Thani 48'	Stadium: Amman International Stadium

10 April 1988 Summer Olympics qualification	United Arab Emirates	3–0	Jordan	Abu Dhabi, United Arab Emirates
	Fahad Khamis; Abdullah Ali Sultan	Report

17 April 1988 Summer Olympics qualification	Jordan	1–2	Iraq	Amman, Jordan
		Report

24 April 1988 Summer Olympics qualification	Iraq	2–0	Jordan	Kuwait City, Kuwait
		Report

=== 1988 ===
15 January Friendly	United Arab Emirates	1–0	Jordan	Bahrain
		Report

18 January Friendly	Jordan	2–0	United Arab Emirates	Bahrain
		Report

28 January Friendly	Oman	1–1	Jordan	Oman
		Report

29 January Friendly	Oman	0–0	Jordan	Oman
		Report

25 March Friendly	Jordan	0–0	Syria	Amman, Jordan
		Report

10 April 1988 Asian Cup qualification	Jordan	1–0	Pakistan	Kuala Lumpur, Malaysia
	Al-Turk 44'	Report

12 April 1988 Asian Cup qualification	Kuwait	0–0	Jordan	Kuala Lumpur, Malaysia
		Report

16 April 1988 Asian Cup qualification	Japan	1–1	Jordan	Kuala Lumpur, Malaysia
		Report

19 June Friendly	Syria	1–0	Jordan	Syria
		Report

20 June Friendly	North Yemen	0–2	Jordan	North Yemen
		Report

3 July Friendly	Jordan	1–0	Lebanon	Amman, Jordan
		Report

8 July 1988 Arab Cup Group B	Jordan	0–0	Bahrain	Amman, Jordan
		Report		Stadium: Amman International Stadium; Attendance: 15,000

10 July 1988 Arab Cup Group B	Jordan	0–1	Kuwait U23	Amman, Jordan
		Report	Al Breiki	Stadium: Amman International Stadium; Attendance: 21,000

14 July 1988 Arab Cup Group B	Jordan	2–1	Algeria UT	Amman, Jordan
	Yadaje 61'; Abdel Muneim 75'	Report	El-Groud 74'	Stadium: Amman International Stadium; Attendance: 27,000

16 July 1988 Arab Cup Group B	Jordan	2–0	Syria	Amman, Jordan
	Yadaje 12'; Al Sahob 35'	Report		Stadium: Amman International Stadium; Attendance: 27,000

19 July 1988 Arab Cup semi-finals	Iraq	3–0	Jordan	Amman, Jordan
	Radhi 22'; Ali 45'; Sharif 80'	Report		Stadium: Amman International Stadium; Attendance: 33,000

21 July 1988 Arab Cup third place	Egypt	2–0	Jordan	Amman, Jordan
	Mayhoub 49'; H. Hassan 90'	Report		Stadium: Amman International Stadium

17 November Friendly	United Arab Emirates	2–1	Jordan	United Arab Emirates
		Report

20 November Friendly	United Arab Emirates	3–2	Jordan	United Arab Emirates
		Report

25 November Friendly	Syria	1–0	Jordan	Syria
		Report

=== 1989 ===
8 April 1989 World Cup qualification first round	Jordan	0–0	United Arab Emirates	Riffa, Bahrain
		Report		Stadium: Bahrain National Stadium; Attendance: 3,000; Referee: Omer Al Mehannah (Saudi Arabia)

14 April 1989 World Cup qualification first round	Bahrain	1–0	Jordan	Riffa, Bahrain
	Al-Doseri 27'	Report		Stadium: Bahrain National Stadium; Attendance: 4,000; Referee: Eskandar Hammal (Syria)

19 April 1989 World Cup qualification first round	Jordan	4–1	Bahrain	Sharjah, United Arab Emirates
	Tadrus 14', 89'; Al-Sheikh 33'; Al-Khatib 88'	Report	Rashed 43'	Stadium: Sports Stadium; Attendance: 4,000; Referee: Menfi Redha Falah (Iraq)

26 April 1989 World Cup qualification first round	United Arab Emirates	2–0	Jordan	Sharjah, United Arab Emirates
	Al Talyani 27'; Mubarak 88'	Report		Stadium: Sports Stadium; Attendance: 12,000; Referee: Hossein Asgari (Iran)

== Head-to-head records ==
As of match played 26 April 1989 against the United Arab Emirates

Key

Positive balance (more wins than losses)
Neutral balance (as many wins as losses)
Negative balance (more losses than wins)

Head to head records
Opponent	P	W	D	L	GF	GA	W%	D%	L%
Afghanistan	1	1	0	0	6	1	100	0	0
Algeria UT	1	1	0	0	2	1	100	0	0
Bahrain	8	2	2	4	7	9	25	25	50
China	1	0	0	1	0	6	0	0	100
Cyprus	1	1	0	0	2	1	100	0	0
Egypt	3	0	0	3	2	8	0	0	100
Hong Kong	1	0	1	0	1	1	0	100	0
Iraq	11	1	0	10	8	32	9.09	0	90.91
Japan	1	0	1	0	1	1	0	100	0
Kuwait (Note: Includes Kuwait national under-23 football team.)	5	0	1	4	0	7	0	20	80
Lebanon	1	1	0	0	1	0	100	0	0
Malta	1	0	0	1	1	3	0	0	100
Mexico	1	0	1	0	0	0	0	100	0
North Yemen	1	1	0	0	2	0	100	0	0
Oman	4	2	2	0	4	1	50	50	0
Pakistan	1	1	0	0	1	0	100	0	0
Qatar	8	2	1	5	3	11	25	12.5	62.5
Saudi Arabia	3	0	0	3	1	8	0	0	100
Sierra Leone	1	0	0	1	1	2	0	0	100
South Yemen	1	0	0	1	1	2	0	0	100
Syria	9	2	1	6	6	11	22.22	11.11	66.67
United Arab Emirates	10	1	3	6	6	16	10	30	60
