= Lebanon national football team results (1990–1999) =

This is a list of the Lebanon national football team results from 1990 to 1999.

Following the Lebanese Civil War, Lebanon's first qualifying tournament was the 1994 World Cup qualification, where they failed to qualify finishing third in their group. They also failed to qualify to the 1996 Asian Cup and the 1998 World Cup. Lebanon participated in the 1997 Pan Arab Games, where they finished third, the 1998 Arab Cup, the 1998 Asian Games and the 1999 Pan Arab Games.

== Results ==
Legend for encounters
| PR | Preliminary round |
| R2 | Second round |
| GS | Group stage |
| SF | Semi-final |

=== 1993 ===
| 20 January 1993 Friendly | Kuwait | 2–0 | Lebanon | Kuwait City, Kuwait |
| | al-Briki 79'; Jedid 88' | | | Attendance: 7,000 |

| 26 March 1993 Friendly | Lebanon | 1–0 | Jordan | Beirut, Lebanon |
| | Nazha 25' | | | Attendance: 15,000 |

| 7 May 1993 1994 World Cup qualification | Lebanon | 2–2 | India | Beirut, Lebanon |
| | Malikian 37'; Taha 53' | | Kumar 65'; Vatta Barambath 83' | Attendance: 17,000 |

| 9 May 1993 1994 World Cup qualification | Lebanon | 2–2 | Hong Kong | Beirut, Lebanon |
| | Joulfagi 44'; Alloush 79' (pen.) | | Tam Siu Wai 13'; Chong Kam Wa 19' | Attendance: 18,500 |

| 11 May 1993 1994 World Cup qualification | Lebanon | 0–1 | South Korea | Beirut, Lebanon |
| | | | Ha Seok-Ju 18' | Attendance: 20,000 |

| 13 May 1993 1994 World Cup qualification | Lebanon | 0–0 | Bahrain | Beirut, Lebanon |
| | | | | Attendance: 17,000 |

| 5 June 1993 1994 World Cup qualification | Bahrain | 0–0 | Lebanon | Seoul, South Korea |
| | | | | Attendance: 15,000 |

| 7 June 1993 1994 World Cup qualification | South Korea | 2–0 | Lebanon | Seoul, South Korea |
| | Ha Seok-Ju 32'; Hwang Bo-Kwan 56' | | | Attendance: 70,000 |

| 9 June 1993 1994 World Cup qualification | Hong Kong | 1–2 | Lebanon | Seoul, South Korea |
| | Lee Kin-Wo 15' | | Farhat 38'; Nazha 76' | Attendance: 20,000 |

| 11 June 1993 1994 World Cup qualification | India | 1–2 | Lebanon | Seoul, South Korea |
| | Takur 44' | | Ayyoub 41' (pen.); Joulfagi 79' | Attendance: 8,000 |

=== 1995 ===
| 6 December 1995 Friendly | Lebanon | 2–1 | Slovakia | Beirut, Lebanon |
| | Taha 50'; Ayyoub 85' (pen.) | | Semenik 36' | Attendance: 11,000 |

=== 1996 ===
| 3 January 1996 Friendly | Lebanon | 2–1 | Kazakhstan | Beirut, Lebanon |
| | Ayyoub 31' (pen.); Alloush 32' | | Imanqulov 8' | Stadium: Beirut Municipal Stadium; Attendance: 14,000 |

| 16 January 1996 Friendly | Lebanon | 1–0 | Cyprus | Beirut, Lebanon |
| | Ghazarian 90' | | | Attendance: 15,000 |

| 11 February 1996 Friendly | Lebanon | 1–0 | Ecuador | Beirut, Lebanon |
| | Ghazarian 14' | | | Stadium: Bourj Hammoud Stadium; Attendance: 17,000 |

| 12 May 1996 1996 Asian Cup qualification | Lebanon | 3–1 | Turkmenistan | Beirut, Lebanon |
| | Nazha 28'; Taha 68'; Karnib 90' | | Bondoev 20' | Attendance: 20,000 |

| 26 May 1996 1996 Asian Cup qualification | Turkmenistan | 0–1 | Lebanon | Ashkhabad, Turkmenistan |
| | | | Ghazarian 33' | Attendance: 10,000 |

| 9 June 1996 1996 Asian Cup qualification | Lebanon | 3–5 | Kuwait | Beirut, Lebanon |
| | Nazha 6'; Ghazarian 10', 46' | | Al-Otaybi 16'; Al-Shlimi 27'; Al-Hindi 30'; Haji 66'; Wabran 84' | Attendance: 22,000 |

| 20 June 1996 1996 Asian Cup qualification | Kuwait | 0–0 | Lebanon | Kuwait City, Kuwait |
| | | | | Attendance: 25,000 |

| 5 September 1996 Friendly | Lebanon | 1–2 | Oman | Beirut, Lebanon |
| | Ghazarian 44' | | Sha'aban 55'; Mubarak 90' | Attendance: 7,000 |

| 8 September 1996 Friendly | Lebanon | 2–1 | Oman | Beirut, Lebanon |
| | Ghazarian 71', 83' | | Salem 42' | Attendance: 10,000 |

| 3 October 1996 Friendly | Lebanon | 2–3 | Bahrain | Tripoli, Lebanon |
| | Guarbetian 27'; Hamzé 90' | | Jassem 69'; Eissa 73'; Juma'a 86' | Attendance: 12,000 |

| 9 October 1996 Friendly | Lebanon | 1–1 | New Zealand | Beirut, Lebanon |
| | Ghazarian 25' | | McClenan 78' | Attendance: 10,000 |

| 13 November 1996 Friendly | Lebanon | 0–0 | Iran | Beirut, Lebanon |
| | | | | Attendance: 20,000 |

| 5 December 1996 Friendly | Lebanon | 4–2 | Georgia | Beirut, Lebanon |
| | Ghazarian 70'; Aslanadze 74' (o.g.); Taha 78'; Hamadé 89' | | Kashvili 58'; Kinkladze 65' | Attendance: 10,000 |

| 8 December 1996 Friendly | Lebanon | 3–2 | Georgia | Beirut, Lebanon |
| | Ayyoub 14' (pen.); Taha 21'; Ghazarian 65' | | Gakhokidze 13'; Tskitishvili 23' | Attendance: 12,000 |

=== 1997 ===
| 12 January 1997 Friendly | Lebanon | 2–2 | Algeria | Beirut, Lebanon |
| | Ghazarian 72'; Nazha 81' | | Lounici 75' (pen.); Tasfaout 88' | Attendance: 15,000 |

| 26 January 1997 Friendly | Lebanon | 2–0 | Estonia | Beirut, Lebanon |
| | Malikian 75'; Wael Nazha 82' | | | Attendance: 10,000 |

| 2 February 1997 Friendly | Lebanon | 1–0 | Jordan | Beirut, Lebanon |
| | Taha 11' | | | Attendance: 7,000 |

| 7 February 1997 Friendly | Jordan | 0–0 | Lebanon | Amman, Jordan |
| | | | | Attendance: 8,000 |

| 19 March 1997 Friendly | United Arab Emirates | 2–1 | Lebanon | Abu Dhabi, United Arab Emirates |
| | Saad 39'; Omar 56' | | Ghazarian 59' | Attendance: 10,000 |

| 13 April 1997 1998 World Cup qualification | Lebanon | 1–1 | Singapore | Beirut, Lebanon |
| | Nazha 48' (pen.) | Report | Zainal 88' | Stadium: Bourj Hammoud Stadium; Attendance: 12,000; Referee: Abdul Rahman Al-Zaid (Saudi Arabia) |

| 27 April 1997 Friendly | Lebanon | 2–0 | Libya | Beirut, Lebanon |
| | Ayyoub 7' (pen.); Ghazarian 63' | | | Attendance: 5,000 |

| 8 May 1997 1998 World Cup qualification | Kuwait | 2–0 | Lebanon | Kuwait City, Kuwait |
| | Al Huwaidi 38'; Al Ahmad 79' | Report | | Stadium: Al-Sadaqua Walsalam Stadium; Attendance: 12,000; Referee: Ali Bujsaim (United Arab Emirates) |

| 24 May 1997 1998 World Cup qualification | Singapore | 1–2 | Lebanon | Kallang, Singapore |
| | Chuan Tan Teng 58' (pen.) | Report | Shehab 35'; Melikian 80' | Stadium: National Stadium; Attendance: 14,455; Referee: Pirom Un-Prasert (Thailand) |

| 22 June 1997 1998 World Cup qualification | Lebanon | 1–3 | Kuwait | Beirut, Lebanon |
| | Shehab 29' | Report | Otaibi 7'; Al Saleh 32'; Hussain 74' | Stadium: Bourj Hammoud Stadium; Attendance: 2,500; Referee: Masayoshi Okada (Japan) |

| 13 July 1997 1997 Pan Arab Games GS | Lebanon | 1–1 | Jordan | Beirut, Lebanon |
| | Shéhab 38' (pen.) | | Abou Hantash 48' | Stadium: Camille Chamoun Sports City Stadium; Attendance: 67,000 |

| 16 July 1997 1997 Pan Arab Games GS | Lebanon | 1–1 | Oman | Beirut, Lebanon |
| | Shéhab 26' | | al-Zabet 21' | Stadium: Beirut Municipal Stadium; Attendance: 25,000 |

| 19 July 1997 1997 Pan Arab Games GS | Lebanon | 2–1 | Libya | Beirut, Lebanon |
| | Shéhab 81' (pen.); Guarbetian 88' | | Muftah 34' | Stadium: Beirut Municipal Stadium; Attendance: 25,000 |

| 24 July 1997 1997 Pan Arab Games SF | Lebanon | 2–3 (a.e.t.) | Syria | Beirut, Lebanon |
| | Shéhab 22' (pen.), 79' (pen.) | | Bayazid 16'; Guarbetian 84' (o.g.); Jabban 100' | Stadium: Camille Chamoun Sports City Stadium; Attendance: 65,000 |

| 21 August 1997 Friendly | Lebanon | 0–2 | Iraq | Beirut, Lebanon |
| | | | Hussein 44', 69' | Stadium: Beirut Municipal Stadium; Attendance: 7,000 |

=== 1998 ===
| 20 July 1998 1998 Arab Nations Cup qualification | Lebanon | 3–1 | Palestine | Beirut, Lebanon |

| 23 July 1998 1998 Arab Nations Cup qualification | Lebanon | 0–2 | Jordan | Beirut, Lebanon |

| 26 July 1998 1998 Arab Nations Cup qualification | Lebanon | 0–1 | Syria | Beirut, Lebanon |

| 18 August 1998 Friendly | Armenia | 1–0 | Lebanon | Yerevan, Armenia |
| | Anamian 75' | | | Stadium: Hrazdan Stadium; Attendance: 2,000 |

| 9 September 1998 Friendly | Kuwait | 0–0 | Lebanon | Kuwait City, Kuwait |
| | | | | Stadium: Al-Sadaqua Walsalam Stadium; Attendance: 8,000; Referee: Abdullatif Al-Dawas (Kuwait) |

| 27 September 1998 1998 Arab Nations Cup GS | Lebanon | 1–4 | Saudi Arabia | Doha, Qatar |
| | al-Indari 88' | | al-Dossari 28', 38', 77' al-Temiat 88' | Attendance: 13,000 |

| 17 October 1998 1998 Friendship Tournament | Lebanon | 3–3 | Syria | Abu Dhabi, United Arab Emirates |

| 19 October 1998 1998 Friendship Tournament | Lebanon | 1–1 | Sudan | Abu Dhabi, United Arab Emirates |
| | Taha 57' | | Abdullah 84' | Attendance: 7,000 |

| 21 October 1998 1998 Friendship Tournament | United Arab Emirates | 1–0 | Lebanon | Abu Dhabi, United Arab Emirates |
| | al-Noways 56' | | | Attendance: 5,000 |

| 18 November 1998 Friendly | Lebanon | 0–2 | Iraq | Beirut, Lebanon |
| | | | Farhan 54'; Ja'afar 67' | Stadium: Beirut Municipal Stadium; Attendance: 4,000 |

| 30 November 1998 1998 Asian Games PR | China | 4–1 | Lebanon | Surat Thani, Thailand |
| | Zhiyi 21'; Mingyu 45'; Peng 79'; Jinyu 85' | | Taha 61' | Attendance: 8,000 |

| 4 December 1998 1998 Asian Games PR | Cambodia | 1–5 | Lebanon | Surat Thani, Thailand |
| | Hok 70' | | Taha 34', 80'; Shahrour 36' al-Indari 45'; Hojeij 85' | Attendance: 2,000 |

| 8 December 1998 1998 Asian Games 2R | Qatar | 1–0 | Lebanon | Bangkok, Thailand |
| | Hassan 56' | | | Attendance: 7,000 |

| 10 December 1998 1998 Asian Games 2R | Thailand | 1–0 | Lebanon | Bangkok, Thailand |
| | Worrawoot 37' | | | Attendance: 50,000 |

| 12 December 1998 1998 Asian Games 2R | Kazakhstan | 0–3 | Lebanon | Bangkok, Thailand |
| | | | al-Indari 13', 50' al-Jurdi 77' | Attendance: 7,000 |

=== 1999 ===
| 10 February 1999 Friendly | Lebanon | 0–3 | Czech Republic U21 | Beirut, Lebanon |
| 11:00 |

| 20 August 1999 1999 Pan Arab Games GS1 | Lebanon | 0–2 | United Arab Emirates | Amman, Jordan |
| | | | Omar 63'; Sa'ad 75' | Referee: Abdul-Wahid Khamees (Yemen) |

| 23 August 1999 1999 Pan Arab Games GS2 | Jordan | 1–3 | Lebanon | Amman, Jordan |
| | Al-Shagran 90' | | Zein 42' 61' 88' | Stadium: Amman International Stadium; Attendance: 30,000; Referee: Jamal Al-Ghandour (Egypt) |

| 25 August 1999 1999 Pan Arab Games GS2 | Lebanon | 1–1 | Oman | Irbid, Jordan |
| | Zein 21' | | Sha'baan 50' | Stadium: Al Hassan Stadium; Attendance: 7,000 |

| 27 August 1999 1999 Pan Arab Games GS2 | Iraq | 4–0 | Lebanon | Irbid, Jordan |
| | Mohammed 7' 54'; Raheem 59'; Al-Heil 88' | | | Stadium: Al Hassan Stadium; Attendance: 7,000; Referee: Jamal Al-Ghandour (Egypt) |

| 24 November 1999 Friendly | Lebanon | 0–0 | Malta | Beirut, Lebanon |
| | | Report | | Stadium: Beirut Municipal Stadium; Attendance: 2,000; Referee: Taleb Ramadan (Lebanon) |

| 15 December 1999 Friendly | Malta | 1–0 | Lebanon | Ta' Qali, Malta |
| | Carabott 78' (pen.) | Report | | Stadium: National Stadium; Attendance: 443; Referee: Marco Tura (San Marino) |
Note: The match was abandoned at the 83rd minute following fighting between players.
