= Jordan national football team results (1990–1999) =

- Win Draw Loss

This article provides details of international football games played by the Jordan national football team from 1990 to 1999.

== Results by year ==
Year	GP	W	D	L	Win %
1990	1	0	0	1	0.00
1991	0	0	0	0	—
1992	8	5	1	2	62.50
1993	4	2	1	1	50.00
1994	4	0	1	3	0.00
1995	2	0	0	2	0.00
1996	2	1	0	1	50.00
1997	20	5	8	7	25.00
1998	5	2	2	1	40.00
1999	13	7	2	4	53.85
Total	60	22	15	23	36.67

== Matches ==
=== 1990 ===
1 June Friendly	Jordan	0–2	Iraq	Amman, Jordan
				Stadium: Amman International Stadium

=== 1992 ===
June Friendly	Syria	1–0	Jordan	Syria
		Report

16 August Jordan International Tournament Group A	Jordan	2–0	Pakistan	Amman, Jordan
	Tadrus 15', 54'	Report		Stadium: Amman International Stadium

18 August Jordan International Tournament Group A	Jordan	3–0	Sudan	Amman, Jordan
		Report		Stadium: Amman International Stadium

22 August Jordan International Tournament Group A	Jordan	1–0	Moldova	Amman, Jordan
	Tadrus 85'	Report		Stadium: Amman International Stadium

26 August Jordan International Tournament semi-finals	Jordan	2–1 (a.e.t.)	Congo	Amman, Jordan
		Report		Stadium: Amman International Stadium

28 August Jordan International Tournament final	Jordan	2–0	Iraq	Amman, Jordan
	Hussein 60'; Abdul-Munim 90+2'	Report		Stadium: Amman International Stadium

8 September 1992 Arab Cup Group A	Egypt U21	1–1	Jordan	Aleppo, Syria
	Mansour 68'; Tadrus 6'	Report		Stadium: Al-Hamadaniah Stadium

10 September 1992 Arab Cup Group A	Kuwait	4–1	Jordan	Aleppo, Syria
	Soliman; Al Saleh 54' (?); ?	Report	Muhammad Al-Ashhab	Stadium: Al-Hamadaniah Stadium

=== 1993 ===
2 March Friendly	Jordan	1–1	Syria	Amman, Jordan
				Stadium: Amman International Stadium

12 March Friendly	Qatar	1–2	Jordan	Doha, Qatar
				Stadium: Khalifa International Stadium

26 October Friendly	United Arab Emirates	2–1	Jordan	Abu Dhabi, United Arab Emirates
				Stadium: Zayed Sports City Stadium

28 October Friendly	United Arab Emirates	0–2	Jordan	Abu Dhabi, United Arab Emirates
				Stadium: Zayed Sports City Stadium

=== 1994 ===
26 September Friendly	Jordan	1–2	Morocco	Amman, Jordan
		Report		Stadium: Amman International Stadium

30 September Friendly	Jordan	0–0	Lebanon	Amman, Jordan
		Report		Stadium: Amman International Stadium

2 October Friendly	Egypt	5–0	Jordan	Egypt
		Report

5 October Friendly	Jordan	0–5	Tunisia	Amman, Jordan
		Report

=== 1995 ===
Friendly	Jordan	1–3	Syria	Jordan
		Report

Friendly	Syria	1–3	Jordan	Syria
		Report

=== 1996 ===
9 August 1996 Asian Cup qualification	Jordan	4–0	Pakistan	Amman, Jordan
	Tadrus 35', 83'; Al-Sheyab 54'; Abdul-Munam 87'	Report

13 August 1996 Asian Cup qualification	Jordan	0–1	Iraq	Amman, Jordan
		Report	Abbas 42'; Fawzi 65'; Shenaishil 67'

=== 1997 ===
Friendly	Jordan	1–0	Syria	Jordan
		Report

Friendly	Syria	1–0	Jordan	Syria
		Report

2 February Friendly	Lebanon	1–0	Jordan	Beirut, Lebanon
		Report		Stadium: Bourj Hammoud Stadium; Attendance: 6,000

7 February Friendly	Jordan	0–0	Lebanon	Amman, Jordan
		Report		Stadium: Amman International Stadium; Attendance: 12,000

9 February Friendly	Lebanon	0–0	Jordan	Beirut, Lebanon
		Report		Stadium: Camille Chamoun Stadium

16 February Friendly	Iraq	1–0	Jordan	Baghdad, Iraq
		Report		Stadium: Al Shaab Stadium

23 February Friendly	Iraq	1–0	Jordan	Baghdad, Iraq
		Report		Stadium: Al Shaab Stadium

8 April 1998 World Cup qualification first round	Jordan	0–0	United Arab Emirates	Riffa, Bahrain
		Report		Stadium: Bahrain National Stadium; Attendance: 3,000; Referee: Omer Al Mehannah (Saudi Arabia)

14 April 1998 World Cup qualification first round	Bahrain	1–0	Jordan	Riffa, Bahrain
	Al-Doseri 27'	Report	Rashed 43'	Stadium: Bahrain National Stadium; Attendance: 4,000; Referee: Eskandar Hammal (Syria)

19 April 1998 World Cup qualification first round	Jordan	4–1	Bahrain	Sharjah, United Arab Emirates
	Tadrus 14', 89'; Al-Sheikh 33'; Al-Khatib 88'	Report	Rashed 43'	Stadium: Sports Stadium; Attendance: 3,000; Referee: Omer Al Mehannah (Saudi Arabia)

26 April 1998 World Cup qualification first round	United Arab Emirates	2–0	Jordan	Sharjah, United Arab Emirates
	Al Talyani 27'; Mubarak 88'	Report	Rashed 43'	Stadium: Sports Stadium; Attendance: 12,000; Referee: Hossein Asgari (Iran)

6 June Friendly	Palestine	0–0	Jordan	Palestine
		Report

13 July 1997 Arab Games Group A	Lebanon	1–1	Jordan	Beirut, Lebanon
	Chehab 38'	Report	Abu Hantash 48'	Stadium: Camille Chamoun Stadium

17 July 1997 Arab Games Group A	Jordan	1–1	Libya	Beirut, Lebanon
	Al-Sheyab (?)	Report	(?)	Stadium: Camille Chamoun Stadium

20 July 1997 Arab Games Group A	Jordan	3–1	Oman	Beirut, Lebanon
	Al-Sheyab; Abu-Abed; Tadrus	Report	(?)	Stadium: Camille Chamoun Stadium

23 July 1997 Arab Games semi-finals	Jordan	3–1	Kuwait	Beirut, Lebanon
	Al-Sheyab 43', 55'; Tadrus 90'	Report	Moueidi 2'; Oneizi 90+2'	Stadium: Camille Chamoun Stadium; Attendance: 1,000

27 July 1997 Arab Games final	Jordan	1–0	Syria	Beirut, Lebanon
	Tadrus 84'	Report		Stadium: Camille Chamoun Stadium

21 September Great Artificial River Tournament	Chad	0–1	Jordan	Libya
		Report

23 September Great Artificial River Tournament	Bahrain	0–0	Jordan	Libya
		Report

25 September Great Artificial River Tournament	Libya	1–1	Jordan	Libya
		Report

=== 1998 ===
20 July 1998 Arab Cup qualification	Syria	3–0	Jordan	Lebanon
		Report

23 July 1998 Arab Cup qualification	Lebanon	0–2	Jordan	Lebanon
		Report

26 July 1998 Arab Cup qualification	Jordan	1–1	Palestine	Lebanon
		Report

24 September 1998 Arab Cup Group A	Libya	1–2	Jordan	Doha, Qatar
	El-Masli 61'	Report	Al-Sheikh 36'; Ali 64'	Stadium: Jassim bin Hamad Stadium; Attendance: 4,000; Referee: Salah Ahmed (Sudan)

26 September 1998 Arab Cup Group A	Qatar	2–0	Jordan	Doha, Qatar
	Mustafa 17'; Khamis 69'	Report		Stadium: Jassim bin Hamad Stadium; Attendance: 20,000; Referee: Qassem Hamza (Kuwait)

=== 1999 ===
18 June Friendly	Saudi Arabia	2–0	Jordan	Abha, Saudi Arabia
17:00 UTC+3		Report		Stadium: Prince Sultan Sport City Stadium; Referee: Mohammed Al-Bishri (Saudi Arabia)

22 June Friendly	Saudi Arabia	2–1	Jordan	Abha, Saudi Arabia
17:00 UTC+3		Report		Stadium: Prince Sultan Sport City Stadium; Referee: Abdul Rahman Al Zaid (Saudi Arabia)

28 June Friendly	Jordan	0–1	Iraq	Amman, Jordan
		Report	Abdul-Latif 70'	Stadium: King Abdullah II Stadium

30 June Friendly	Jordan	1–1	Iraq	Amman, Jordan
		Report	Farhan	Stadium: King Abdullah II Stadium

16 July Friendly	Jordan	1–0	Syria	Amman, Jordan
		Report		Stadium: Amman International Stadium

18 July Friendly	Jordan	4–0	Syria	Amman, Jordan
		Report		Stadium: Amman International Stadium

16 August 1999 Arab Games Group A first stage	Jordan	3–0	Qatar U23	Amman, Jordan
	Al-Sheikh 76'; Al-Shaqran 79'; Hamarsheh 90'	Report		Stadium: Amman International Stadium; Attendance: 23,000; Referee: Jamal Al-Ghandour (Egypt)

20 August 1999 Arab Games Group A first stage	Palestine	0–2	Jordan	Amman, Jordan
		Report	Abu Zema 35', 58'	Stadium: Amman International Stadium

23 August 1999 Arab Games Group A second stage	Jordan	0–2	Lebanon	Amman, Jordan
	Al-Shaqran 90'	Report	Zein 42', 61', 88'	Stadium: Amman International Stadium; Attendance: 30,000; Referee: Jamal Al-Ghandour (Egypt)

25 August 1999 Arab Games Group A second stage	Iraq	1–2	Jordan	Amman, Jordan
	Al-Shaqran 90'	Report	Zein 42', 61', 88'	Stadium: Amman International Stadium; Attendance: 30,000; Referee: Jamal Al-Ghandour (Egypt)

27 August 1999 Arab Games Group A second stage	Jordan	2–0	Oman	Amman, Jordan
	Ali 59'Al-Shboul 78'	Report		Stadium: Amman International Stadium; Attendance: 18,000; Referee: Yousef Al-'Aqaily (Saudi Arabia)

29 August 1999 Arab Games semi-finals	Palestine	1–4	Jordan	Amman, Jordan
	Al-Kord 90'	Report	Al-Shaqran 14', 67', 75'; Jummah 41'	Stadium: Amman International Stadium; Attendance: 25,000; Referee: Mourad Al-Da'ami (Tunisia)

31 August 1999 Arab Games final	Jordan	4–4 (a.e.t.) (3–1 p)	Iraq	Amman, Jordan
	Abu Zema 30' (pen.); Al-Shaqran 51', 70'; Shneishel 67' (o.g.)	Report	Fawzi 73', 75' (pen.); Mahmoud 78'; Farhan 87'	Stadium: Amman International Stadium; Attendance: 25,000; Referee: Gamal Al-Ghandour (Egypt)
	Penalties
	Abu Zema (penalty scored); Al-Shaqran (penalty scored); Al-Sheikh (penalty missed); Sufian (penalty scored)		(penalty scored) Shneishel; (penalty missed) Fawzi; (penalty missed) Mezher; (penalty missed) Raheem

== Head-to-head records ==
As of match played 31 August 1999 against Iraq

Key

Positive balance (more wins than losses)
Neutral balance (as many wins as losses)
Negative balance (more losses than wins)

Head to head records
Opponent	P	W	D	L	GF	GA	W%	D%	L%
Bahrain	3	1	1	1	4	2	33.33	33.33	33.33
Chad	1	1	0	0	1	0	100	0	0
Congo	1	1	0	0	2	1	100	0	0
Egypt	1	0	0	1	0	5	0	0	100
Egypt U21	1	0	1	0	1	1	0	100	0
Iraq	9	3	2	4	10	11	33.33	22.22	44.44
Kuwait	2	1	0	1	4	5	50	0	50
Lebanon	7	1	4	2	3	4	14.29	57.14	28.57
Libya	3	1	2	0	4	3	33.33	66.67	0
Moldova	1	1	0	0	1	0	100	0	0
Morocco	1	0	0	1	1	2	0	0	100
Pakistan	2	2	0	0	6	0	100	0	0
Palestine	4	2	2	0	7	2	50	50	0
Qatar	2	1	0	1	2	3	50	0	50
Qatar U23	1	1	0	0	3	0	100	0	0
Saudi Arabia	2	0	0	2	1	4	0	0	100
Sudan	1	1	0	0	3	0	100	0	0
Syria	10	3	1	6	9	13	30	10	60
Tunisia	1	0	0	1	0	5	0	0	100
United Arab Emirates	4	1	1	2	3	4	25	25	50
