= Yang Zhaohui =

Yang Zhaohui may refer to:

- Yang Zhaohui (footballer, born 1962)
- Yang Zhaohui (footballer, born 1998)
