= Khaled Kourdoghli =

Syrian footballer (born 1997)

Personal information
- Birth name: Khaled Abdel Qader Kourdoghli
- Date of birth: January 31, 1997 (age 29)
- Place of birth: Latakia, Syria
- Height: 1.78 m (5 ft 10 in)
- Position: Left-back

Team information
- Current team: Al-Minaa
- Number: 70

Youth career
- Tishreen

Senior career*
Years	Team	Apps	(Gls)
2016–2021	Tishreen		
2021–2023	Naft Al-Wasat		
2023–2024	Al-Wehdat		
2024–2025	Erbil		
2025–2026	Homs Al-Fedaa		
2026	Duhok		
2026–	Al-Minaa		

International career^{‡}
2012	Syria U16	4	(1)
2018–2020	Syria U23	9	(0)
2019–	Syria	44	(0)
- * Club domestic league appearances and goals as of 06:15, 10 January 2024 (UTC) ‡ National team caps and goals as of 17 November 2026

Khaled Abdel Qader Kourdoghli (Arabic: خالد كردغلي; born 31 January 1997) is a Syrian professional footballer who plays as a left-back for Al-Minaa and the Syria national team.

== Club career ==
Kourdoghli began his senior career with the Syrian Premier League club Tishreen in 2016, and helped them win successive leagues in 2020 and 2021 after extending his contract on 31 January 2021. On 8 July 2021, he again extended his contract with Tishreen. On 8 August 2021, he transferred to the Iraqi club Naft Al-Wasat. On 18 July 2023, he moved to the Jordanian club Al-Wehdat.

On 31 July 2026, he moved to the Iraq Stars League club Al-Minaa, and the club officially announced his signing.

== International career ==
Kourdoghli played for the Syria U23s at the 2018 Asian Games. He debuted for the senior Syria national team in a 5–2 friendly win over North Korea on 8 July 2019. He was called up to the national team for the 2023 AFC Asian Cup.

== Personal life ==
Kourdoghli comes from a footballing family, as his grandfather Khaled, father Muhammad, uncles Abdul Kader, Ahmed, and Hisham Kourdoghli all played professional football in Syria. On 22 August 2023 he was married in Syria.

== Honours ==
Tishreen

- Syrian Premier League: 2019–20, 2020–21
