= Siddiq Farooq =

Afghan footballer

Personal information
- Full name: Mohammad Siddiq Farooq
- Date of birth: 16 January 1961
- Place of birth: Kabul, Afghanistan
- Date of death: 21 July 2025 (aged 64)
- Place of death: California, United States
- Position: Midfielder

Senior career*
Years	Team	Apps	(Gls)
- Kabul University

International career
1984	Afghanistan	4	(1)
- * Club domestic league appearances and goals

Mohammad Siddiq Farooq (Persian: محمد صدیق فاروق; 16 January 1961 – 21 July 2025) was an Afghan footballer who played as a midfielder. He represented the Afghanistan national team in the 1980s.

== Club career ==
Farooq started his sports career with the Naderiya High School football team in Kabul, and was later a member of the Kabul University football team.

== International career ==
Farooq represented Afghanistan at the 1984 AFC Asian Cup qualification. He scored the lone goal of the national team in the tournament in a 1–6 defeat against Jordan. This would be the last goal scored of the Afghanistan national team until their long inactivity till 2003.

== Personal life and death ==
Farooq died on 21 July 2025 in California, United States.

== Career statistics ==
=== International goals ===
Scores and results list Afghanistan's goal tally first, score column indicates score after each Farooq goal.

List of international goals scored by Siddiq Farooq
No.	Date	Venue	Opponent	Score	Result	Competition
1	20 September 1984	Yuexiushan Stadium, Guangzhou, China	Jordan	1–0	1–6	1984 AFC Asian Cup qualification
