= Ghassan Choueikh =

Lebanese footballer (born 1975)

Personal information
- Full name: Ghassan Habib Choueikh
- Date of birth: 4 June 1975 (age 51)
- Position: Forward

Senior career*
Years	Team	Apps	(Gls)
1997–1999	Bourj		(6)
1999–2000	Majd		(10)
2000–2001	Shabab Sahel		(9)
2001–2002	Tadamon Sour		(8)
2002–2005	Safa		(21)
2005–2006	Rayyan Sarafand		(1)
2006–2007	Shabab Sahel		(8)
2007–2009	Tadamon Sour		(21)
2009–2011	Mabarra		(7)
2011–2012	Tadamon Sour		(5)
Total			(97)

International career
1998–2000	Lebanon	6	(1)
- * Club domestic league appearances and goals

Ghassan Habib Choueikh (Arabic: غسان حبيب شويخ; born 4 June 1975) is a Lebanese former footballer who played as a forward.

Choueikh spent his career playing for several clubs in the Lebanese Premier League, scoring 97 goals between 1997 and 2012. He also played for the Lebanon national team, scoring one goal in six appearances between 1998 and 2000.

== Club career ==
Choueikh played for Majd during the 1999–2000 Lebanese Premier League. In September 2000, he joined Shabab Sahel after being acquired by Tadamon Sour and exchanged for Imad Al Miri. He returned to Tadamon in 2001, representing the club during the 2001–02 season.

In November 2005, Choueikh transferred from Safa to Rayyan Sarafand. After one season at Shabab Sahel, he returned to Tadamon ahead of the 2007–08 season. In June 2008, he scored in a 3–2 victory over Safa to help his side avoid relegation. During the 2008–09 season, Choueikh was among the league's leading scorers, having scored four goals for Tadamon by November 2008.

Choueikh joined Mabarra ahead of the 2009–10 season. He later returned to Tadamon Sour, where he ended his playing career in 2012. Over the course of his career, he scored 97 goals in the Lebanese Premier League across 15 seasons.

== International career ==
Shweikh was called up to the Lebanon national team for the 1998 Asian Games in Thailand. He made six appearances and scored one goal for Lebanon between 1998 and 2000.

== Career statistics ==
=== International ===
Appearances and goals by national team and year
National team	Year	Apps	Goals
Lebanon	1998	4	1
Lebanon	1999	1	0
Lebanon	2000	1	0
Total		6	1

Scores and results list Lebanon's goal tally first, score column indicates score after each Choueikh goal.

List of international goals scored by Ghassan Choueikh
No.	Date	Venue	Opponent	Score	Result	Competition
1	19 October 1998	Sheikh Zayed Stadium, Abu Dhabi, United Arab Emirates	Syria	2–?	3–3	1998 Friendship Tournament

== Honours ==
Shabab Sahel

- Lebanese Super Cup runner-up: 2000

Tadamon Sour

- Lebanese Elite Cup: 2001

Mabarra

- Lebanese FA Cup runner-up: 2009–10
