= Judy Saluria =

Filipino footballer

Personal information
- Position: Defender

Senior career*
Years	Team	Apps	(Gls)
- Philippine Army

International career
	Philippines		(~1)
- * Club domestic league appearances and goals

Judy Saluria is a retired Filipino footballer who played for the Philippines national football team.

== Career ==
Saluria plated for Philippine Army F.C. and was a frequent member of the Philippines national football team as a defender. He was part of the squad that played in the 1991 Southeast Asian Games.

He would also feature in the 1996 AFF Championship in Singapore. Saluria was offered money to match fix a game against Singapore. He was told to let his side concede seven goals. He rejected the offer and in coordination with coach Hans Smit and Singaporean authorities, got involved in the arrest of three match-fixers.

Saluria would become an assistant coach of Arellano University's football team under his brother Ravelo.

=== International goals ===
Scores and results list the Philippines' goal tally first.

Date	Venue	Opponent	Score	Result	Competition
May 6, 1991	Iloilo Sports Complex, Iloilo City	Brunei	1–0	2–1	1991 Philippines International Cup

== Personal life ==
Saluria hails from Barotac Nuevo and was an enlisted personnel of the Philippine Army. He has four brothers with his father Segundo Saluria Sr., a policeman, responsible for setting up the first football team in Cotabato.
