= Ahmed Kurdughli =

Syrian footballer (born 1975)

Personal information
- Date of birth: 25 September 1975 (age 51)
- Place of birth: Syria
- Position: Midfielder

Senior career*
Years	Team	Apps	(Gls)
1996–1999	Tishreen		
1999–2000	Proodeftiki	1	(0)
2000–2005	Tishreen		

International career
1996–1997	Syria	4	(1)
- * Club domestic league appearances and goals

Ahmed Kurdughli (Arabic: أحمد كردغلي, born 25 September 1975) is a Syrian former footballer who played as a midfielder. He was capped 4 times by the Syria national team and scored one goal, and he played in the 1996 Asian Cup with Syria.

== Personal life ==
Kurdughli's father Kader, brothers Abdul Kader, Muhammed and Hisham, and nephew Khaled Kourdoghli, all played professional football in Syria.
