= Elmer Bedia =

Australian-Filipino association football player

Personal information
- Date of birth: 1962 (age 63–64)
- Place of birth: Barotac Nuevo, Iloilo, Philippines
- Positions: Striker; winger

Senior career*
Years	Team	Apps	(Gls)
?–c. 1979	Barotac Nuevo		
c. 1979–?	Philippine Air Force F.C.		
c. 1986–1995	Brisbane Olympic United F.C.		

International career
c. 1991–?	Philippines		

Managerial career
- 2011: Philippines (Homeless World Cup; assistant)
- * Club domestic league appearances and goals

Elmer "Lacknet" Bedia is a retired Australian-Filipino footballer who played for the Philippine Air Force FC, Brisbane Olympic United F.C. and the Philippines national team. Bedia was notable for being the first Filipino to play in Division I of Germany's professional league as well as in Australia. Bedia was named the Philippines' "Mr. Football" and was hailed as one of the top ten players in Australia in 1986. Bedia received the Achievement Award in 2011

== Early life ==
Elmer Bedia was born in 1962 in Barotac Nuevo, Iloilo.

== Career ==
Bedia played for the Philippine national youth team in tournaments by age 11.

Bedia played for Barotac Nuevo in the defunct National Football League. He was scouted during the Don Andres Soriano Memorial Cup in 1979 where he was instrumental to his team's title win against San Miguel Corporation which was mentored by Juan Cutillas. He was immediately signed to the Philippine Air Force F.C. under coach Lope Q. Pascual at age 17. He was part of the Air Force squad that won several national league and other tournament titles in the 1980s playing along with Mariano Araneta, Ronnel Cajelo, Rodolfo Alicante, and Edgar Berja.

He was included in the Philippine national team's squad to the 1991 Southeast Asian Games. Bedia was instrumental to the Philippine team's upset win over Malaysia where he assisted the Philippines' sole and winning goal by Norman Fegidero.

He played for Brisbane Olympic United F.C. for nine years.

== Post-retirement ==
Elmer Bedia is still involved in the Philippine's grassroot football program as a consultant to the Philippines' representatives to the Homeless World Cup, assisting Rudy del Rosario, his former teammate. In 2013, he was reportedly working as a junior coach and also works full-time for Com Group company. He also launched the Elmer Lacknet Bedia Football Academy in his hometown Barotac Nuevo on March 30–31, 2013.

By January 2017, he is working as the coach of the junior team of Brisbane Olympic United F.C.

== Personal life ==
Elmer Bedia has been living in Australia since 1986. Elmer is married to Maria Theresa Salazar Bedia with whom he has six children. Elmer moved to Australia at age 24 after he was signed by Brisbane Olympic United F.C. His children, Clar, Elgin, Elmer Jr. and LA, were also players of the club. Elmer's son Loverney Pele played for the U-16 Brisbane City F.C. as a central defender and for his school team St. Peter Claver College as a striker.

== Honors ==
Individual

- Philippine Sportswriters Association Footballer of the Year (Mr. Football Award): 1981, 1983, 1984
