= Hassan Ayoub =

Lebanese footballer and coach (born 1967)

Personal information
- Date of birth: 4 April 1967 (age 59)
- Height: 1.83 m (6 ft 0 in)
- Position: Centre-back

Youth career
- 1976–1985: Nejmeh

Senior career*
Years	Team	Apps	(Gls)
1985–1986	Nejmeh		
1986–1996	Safa		
1996–2002	Sagesse		
2002	Olympic Beirut		
2002–2003	Akhaa Ahli Aley		

International career
1980s	Lebanon U20		
1991	Lebanon U23		
1993–1999	Lebanon	23	(5)
- * Club domestic league appearances and goals

Hassan Ayoub (Arabic: حسن أيوب; born 4 April 1967) is a Lebanese football coach and former player who played as a centre-back.

Ayoub played in the Lebanese Premier League for Nejmeh, Safa and Sagesse, and helped Akhaa Ahli Aley win the Lebanese Second Division. He also played for the Lebanon national team.

== Club career ==
=== Nejmeh ===
Ayoub began playing football for Nejmeh in 1976 aged nine. He made his senior debut in the early-1980s against Tadamon Beirut, scoring the lone goal of the game. Due to limited playing time, he moved to Safa in 1986.

=== Safa ===
After helping Safa win the Lebanese FA Cup in 1986–87, the club's first major trophy, he participated with the team in the 1986 Arab Club Champions Cup. While initially a midfielder for Safa, he was moved to centre-back.

=== Late career ===
In 1996, Ayoub moved to Sagesse in a deal worth $100,000. He moved to Olympic Beirut in May 2002; his contract was terminated by mutual consent four months later due to a severe injury. Ayoub finished his playing career at Akhaa Ahli Aley, helping them win the Lebanese Second Division in 2002–03.

== International career ==
Having represented Lebanon internationally at under-20 and under-23 levels, Ayoub played for the senior team in the 1994 and 1998 FIFA World Cup qualifiers.

== Coaching career ==
Following his retirement as a player, Ayoub became a coach. He worked in the technical staffs of Nejmeh, Safa and Ahed, and was also part of the Lebanon national team technical staff in 2010. Ayoub also worked as a sports analyst for Qatari TV channel Al Kass, and as a banker for Bank of Beirut.

== Personal life ==
Ayoub and his wife have two sons: Salim and Karim. His brother, Mohamad Ayoub, also played football as a goalkeeper.

== Honours ==
Safa

- Lebanese FA Cup: 1986–87; runner-up: 1989–90, 1990–91, 1994–95

Sagesse

- Lebanese Second Division: 1998–99
- Lebanese Premier League runner-up: 2001–02

Olympic Beirut

- Lebanese Premier League: 2002–03
- Lebanese FA Cup: 2002–03

Akhaa Ahli Aley

- Lebanese Second Division: 2002–03
