= Marwan Arafat =

Syrian football referee (1945–2012)

Mohammad Marwan Arafat (Arabic: محمد مروان عرفات; 5 January 1945 – 12 June 2012) was a Syrian football referee, sports analyst, academic lecturer and journalist, well known for being the first Arabic and Asian football referee to be a linesman in a third place Olympic game match (Moscow 1980). He was the head of the Syrian football association three times. During his presidency of the Syrian FA, the Syrian U-21 team won the Asian cup in 1994 in Indonesia.

== Early life ==
Marwan Arafat was born in the district of Rukn ad-Deen in Damascus, where he finished his primary and secondary school studies. He continued his studies in Geography department of the Damascus University. He received his diploma and Master's degree in Education from the Damascus University. Later on, he received his PhD in Physical education from the United States.

== Later life ==
Arafat was married to Afaf Al-Hibri and had four children: Waheed (a lawyer), Hanadi (a Sport teacher and special Olympics trainer), Waseem (a Urologist in Germany) and Waddah (Internal Medicine physician at Indiana University in the United States). Arafat was a journalist, lecturer in Asian football and a sports figure in Syrian football and media. He was a lecturer in Damascus University from 1978 until his death in 2012.

== Death ==
According to the Syrian government sources, on 12 June 2012, Arafat was assassinated by unknown armed militants on the Daraa-Damascus road, while his wife was severely injured.
