= Bassam Al-Khatib =

Jordanian footballer

Personal information
- Date of birth: 5 October 1975 (age 51)
- Place of birth: Amman, Jordan
- Position: Forward

Team information
- Current team: Shabab Al-Ordon

Senior career*
Years	Team	Apps	(Gls)
1995–2004	Al-Ahli		
1999–2000	→ Mahindra United (loan)		
2004–2008	Shabab Al-Ordon		

International career
1997–2000	Jordan	?	(5)

Managerial career
- 2011: Shabab Al-Ordon (assistant manager)
- * Club domestic league appearances and goals

Bassam Al-Khatib (born October 5, 1975) is a retired Jordanian professional footballer who played most of his career for Jordanian club Al-Ahli Amman alongside Jordan national football team. He is currently assistant coach for Jordanian football club Shabab Al-Ordon Club.

Al-Khatib also appeared with Indian NFL side Mahindra United in 1999–2000.

== International goals ==
#	Date	Venue	Opponent	Score	Result	Competition
1	19 April 1997	Sharjah	Bahrain	4–1	Win	1998 FIFA World Cup qualification
2	23 July 1998	Beirut	Lebanon	2–0	Win	1998 Arab Nations Cup qualification
3	4 April 2000	Doha	Palestine	5–1	Win	2000 AFC Asian Cup qualification (2 goals)
4	6 April 2000	Doha	Pakistan	5–0	Win	2000 AFC Asian Cup qualification
