= Zayed Stadium =

Zayed Stadium can refer to several stadiums named after members of the Al Nahyan family in the United Arab Emirates.

- Zayed Sports City Stadium in Abu Dhabi
- Sheikh Zayed Cricket Stadium in Abu Dhabi
- Hazza bin Zayed Stadium in Al Ain, named after Hazza bin Zayed bin Sultan Al Nahyan
- Mohammed bin Zayed Stadium in Abu Dhabi, named after Mohammed bin Zayed Al Nahyan
- Khalifa bin Zayed Stadium in Al Ain, named after Khalifa bin Zayed Al Nahyan

== See also ==
- List of football stadiums in the United Arab Emirates
- Al Nahyan Stadium
