= Mubarak Al-Khater =

Qatari footballer (born 1966)

Mubarak Salem
Personal information
- Full name: Mubarak Salem Al-Khater
- Date of birth: 8 January 1966 (age 60)
- Place of birth: Doha, Qatar
- Height: 1.70 m (5 ft 7 in)
- Position: Midfielder

Senior career*
Years	Team	Apps	(Gls)
1983–1993	Al-Rayyan		

International career
1983–1993	Qatar		
- * Club domestic league appearances and goals

Mubarak Salem Al-Khater is a Qatari football forward who played for Qatar in the 1984 Asian Cup and in 1984 Summer Olympics.

== Record at International Tournaments ==
Year	Competition	Apps	Goal
1984	1984 Summer Olympics	3	0
Total		3	0
