= 1998 Friendship Tournament =

Tournament details
- Host country: United Arab Emirates
- City: Abu Dhabi
- Dates: 17–21 October 1998
- Teams: 4 (from 2 confederations)
- Venue: 1 (in 1 host city)

Final positions
- Champions: United Arab Emirates (1st title)
- Runners-up: Syria
- Third place: Lebanon
- Fourth place: Sudan

Tournament statistics
- Matches played: 6
- Goals scored: 18 (3 per match)

The 1998 Friendship Tournament was the fourth edition of the Friendship Tournament, and was held from 17 to 21 October 1998 in Abu Dhabi, United Arab Emirates. Four teams participated: the United Arab Emirates, Sudan, Lebanon, and Syria. The United Arab Emirates won the tournament.

== Participants ==
- United Arab Emirates (hosts)
- Lebanon
- Sudan
- Syria

== Standings ==
Pos	Team	Pld	W	D	L	GF	GA	GD	Pts	
1	United Arab Emirates	3	3	0	0	4	1	+3	9	Winners
2	Syria	3	1	1	1	6	6	0	4	
3	Lebanon	3	0	2	1	4	5	−1	2	
4	Sudan	3	0	1	2	4	6	−2	1	

Source: RSSSF

== Matches ==
17 October 1998

United Arab Emirates	2–1	Sudan
Saad 71'; Jumaa 86'		Zaki 38'

Abu Dhabi
Attendance: 17,000
Referee: Said Belqola (Morocco)
17 October 1998

Lebanon	3–3	Syria
Ghazarian 28'; Shouweikh 48' (pen.); Al Indari 67'		Jabban 30'; Al Homsi 39'; Bayazid (?)

Al Nahyan Stadium, Abu Dhabi
Referee: Ali Bujsaim (United Arab Emirates)

19 October 1998

Sudan	1–1	Lebanon
Abdullah 84'		Taha 57'

Abu Dhabi
Attendance: 7,000
Referee: Mohamed Al Mulla (United Arab Emirates)
19 October 1998

United Arab Emirates	1–0	Syria
Saeed 23'

Al Nahyan Stadium, Abu Dhabi
Referee: Gamal Al-Ghandour (Egypt)

21 October 1998

United Arab Emirates	1–0	Lebanon
Al Nuwais 56'

Al Nahyan Stadium, Abu Dhabi
Attendance: 5,000
21 October 1998

Syria	3–2	Sudan

Abu Dhabi
Referee: Ali Ahmed Abdulla Saleh (United Arab Emirates)

== Winner ==
1998 Friendship Tournament

United Arab Emirates
First title

== Statistics ==
=== Goalscorers ===
There were 18 goals scored in 6 matches, for an average of 3 goals per match.

1 goal

- (Lebanon) Jamal Taha
- (Lebanon) Ghassan Showeikh
- (Lebanon) Vartan Ghazarian
- (Lebanon) Zaher Al Indari
- (Sudan) Salah Abdullah
- (Sudan) Othman Zaki
- (Syria) Tarek Jabban
- (Syria) Mustafa Al Homsi
- (Syria) Said Bayazid
- (United Arab Emirates) Fahad Al Nuwais
- (United Arab Emirates) Khamis Saad
- (United Arab Emirates) Hassen Saeed
- (United Arab Emirates) Ali Thani Jumaa

== See also ==
1997 Pan Arab Games
