= Walid Abu Al-Sel =

Syrian footballer (born 1963)

Waleed Abu Al-Sel
Personal information
- Full name: Waleed Abu Al-Sel
- Date of birth: 1963 (age 62–63)
- Place of birth: Nawa, Syria
- Height: 1.84 m (6 ft 1/2 in)
- Position: Forward

Senior career*
Years	Team	Apps	(Gls)
1979–1986	Nawa SC		
1986–1987	Al-Jaish		
1987–1989	Tishreen		
1989–1994	Al-Shouleh		
1994–1997	Saham Club		
1997–1998	Al-Ittihad Salalah		

International career
1981–1992	Syria	65	(30)
- * Club domestic league appearances and goals

Walid Abu Al-Sel (Arabic: وليد أبو السل; born 1963) is a Syrian former football forward who played for Syria in the 1984 and 1988 editions of the AFC Asian Cup. Al-Sel played as a forward.
