= Thanis Areesngarkul =

Thai retired professional footballer

Personal information
- Full name: Thanis Areesngarkul
- Date of birth: 12 August 1962 (age 64)
- Place of birth: Thailand
- Height: 1.87 m (6 ft 2 in)
- Position: Forward

International career
| Years | Team | Apps | (Gls) |
| 1984–1992 | Thailand | 13 | (8) |

Managerial career
- 2008: Provincial Electricity Authority FC
- 2010: Thailand U16 (assistance)
- 2017: Army United

Thanis Areesngarkul is a Thai retired professional footballer who played as a forward. He represented Thailand in the 1992 Asian Cup.
