= Abdul Kader Kardaghli =

Syrian footballer (born 1961)

Personal information
- Full name: Abdul Kader Kardaghli
- Date of birth: 1 January 1961 (age 65)
- Place of birth: Lattakia, Syria
- Position: Midfielder

Youth career
- Tishreen SC

Senior career*
Years	Team	Apps	(Gls)
1979–1985	Tishreen SC		
1985–1988	Al-Jaish SC		
1988	Jableh SC		
1988–1996	Tishreen SC		

International career
1982–1993	Syria		
- * Club domestic league appearances and goals

Abdul Kader Kardaghli (Arabic: عبد القادر كردغلي; born 1 January 1961) is a Syrian former football midfielder who played for Syria in the 1984 Asian Cup in Singapore and 1988 Asian Cup in Qatar. He was popularly dubbed, "Malik" (translated to King).

== Personal life ==
Kurdughli's father Kader, brothers Ahmed, Muhammed and Hisham, and nephew Khaled Kourdoghli, all played professional football in Syria.

== Honours ==
Tishreen

- Syrian League: 1982; runner-up: 1988, 1994
- Syrian Cup runner-up: 1988

Al-Jaish SC

- Syrian League: 1985, 1986
- Syrian Cup: 1986

Syria

- Mediterranean Games Gold medal: 1987
- Arab Nations Cup runner-up: 1988

Individual

- Syrian League top scorer: 1984
- Best player of the Arab Nations Cup: 1988
- Best Syrian player of the century
