= Rudy del Rosario =

Filipino footballer and coach (1969–2020)

Personal information
- Date of birth: September 15, 1969
- Date of death: November 20, 2020 (aged 51)
- Position: Forward

College career
Years	Team	Apps	(Gls)
–	Polytechnic University of the Philippines		

Senior career*
Years	Team	Apps	(Gls)
–	Kaya F.C.		

International career
1991–1997	Philippines		
2001	Philippines (futsal)		

Managerial career
- ?–2015: Kaya
- 2010–?: Philippines (Homeless World Cup)
- * Club domestic league appearances and goals

Rudy del Rosario (15 September 1969 – 20 November 2020) was a Filipino football coach and footballer who played for the Philippines national football team and Kaya F.C.

== College career ==
Del Rosario played for the football team of the University of the Philippines.

== Club career ==
Kaya F.C., which now plays in the Philippines Football League, was established in 1996 by del Rosario along with Bob Kovacs and John Rey Bela-Ong. He was also served as a player with the club.

== International career ==
Del Rosario played for the Philippines national football team and was captain from 1994 to 1997. He was part of the Philippine squad for the 1991 Southeast Asian Games. which won 1–0 against Malaysia, which was considered as an upset at the time. In the 1994 Philippine Cup, a tournament held at the Rizal Memorial Club which the national team won, del Rosario was part of the squad that defeated South China A.A., Taipei Tigers and a Xiamen provincial selection. He also came out of retirement to play for the national futsal team at the 2001 AFF Futsal Championship.

== Coaching career ==
After his retirement, del Rosario served as head coach of Kaya F.C. In 2010, he became the long-time coach of the Philippine squad which participated in the Homeless World Cup.

== Death ==
Del Rosario died on November 20, 2020, after slipping and had a bad fall the day before.
