= Mohammed Al-Mohanadi =

Qatari footballer (born 1972)

Mohamed Al-Mohannadi
Personal information
- Date of birth: 10 October 1972 (age 54)
- Position: Forward

International career
Years	Team	Apps	(Gls)
- Qatar

Mohammed Al-Mohanadi (born 10 October 1972) is a Qatari football forward who played for Qatar in the 1984 Asian Cup. He competed in the men's tournament at the 1992 Summer Olympics.
