= Man'a Al-Barshi =

Qatari footballer

Personal information
- Place of birth: Qatar
- Position: Forward

International career
Years	Team	Apps	(Gls)
1984–1986	Qatar		(1)

Man'a Soud Al-Barshi is a Qatari football forward who played for Qatar in the 1984 AFC Asian Cup.

Al-Barshi appeared once for Qatar in the 1984 AFC Asian Cup group stage matches.
