= Radwan Al-Sheikh Hassan =

Syrian footballer

Personal information
- Place of birth: Syria
- Height: 1.88 m (6 ft 2 in)
- Position: Defender

International career
Years	Team	Apps	(Gls)
- Syria

Radwan Al-Sheikh Hassan (Arabic: رضوان الشيخ حسن) is a Syrian football defender who played for Syria in the 1984 Asian Cup.
