= Yang Zhaohui (footballer, born 1962) =

Chinese footballer

Yang Zhaohui 杨朝晖
Personal information
- Date of birth: 14 September 1962 (age 64)
- Place of birth: Beijing, China
- Height: 1.80 m (5 ft 11 in)
- Position: Midfielder

Senior career*
Years	Team	Apps	(Gls)
- Beijing team
1993	Fujitsu		
2000	Beijing Bodao		

International career
1984–1985	China	11	(5)
Medal record
Men's football
Representing China
AFC Asian Cup
Silver medal – second place	1984 Singapore	Team
- * Club domestic league appearances and goals

Yang Zhaohui is a Chinese football midfielder who played for China in the 1984 Asian Cup. He also played for Beijing team

== Career statistics ==
=== International statistics ===
Year	Competition	Apps	Goal
1984	Asian Cup Qualification	2	2
1984	Asian Cup	4	1
1985	FIFA World Cup qualification	5	2
Total		11	5
