= Nabil El-Sibai =

Syrian footballer

Personal information
- Place of birth: Syria
- Position: Midfielder

International career
Years	Team	Apps	(Gls)
- Syria

Nabil El-Sibai is a Syrian football midfielder who played for Syria in the 1984 Asian Cup.
