= Marwan Madarati =

Syrian footballer (born 1959)

Personal information
- Full name: Pelusa
- Date of birth: 18 March 1959 (age 67)
- Place of birth: Syria
- Position: Forward

Senior career*
Years	Team	Apps	(Gls)
- Al-Jaish

International career
- Syria
- * Club domestic league appearances and goals

Marwan Madarati is a Syrian former footballer who played as a forward for Al-Jaish and the Syria national team.
