= 1998 Arab Cup qualification =

The 1998 Arab Cup was the seventh edition of the Arab Cup that hosted by Qatar. Saudi Arabia won their first title.

== Qualifying format ==
- Qatar qualified as hosts.
- Egypt qualified as holders.
- Saudi Arabia and Morocco qualified as World Cup qualifiers.
- The Qualifying Stage is divided into 4 Groups based on the Geography regions, the groups are: The Levant, The Gulf, The Red sea and The North Africa group, Top teams qualify to the 1998 Arab Cup.

== Qualification ==
=== Group A (Gulf Region) ===
Team	Pld	W	D	L	GF	GA	GD	Pts
Kuwait	Qualified							
United Arab Emirates	Qualified							
Bahrain	Withdrew							
Oman	Withdrew							

- Bahrain and Oman withdrew.
- Kuwait and United Arab Emirates qualified for finals.

=== Group B (Red Sea Region) ===
Team	Pld	W	D	L	GF	GA	GD	Pts
Sudan	Qualified							
Yemen	Withdrew							
Somalia	Withdrew							
Comoros	Withdrew							

- Yemen, Somalia and Comoros withdrew.
- Sudan qualified for finals.

=== Group C (North Africa Region) ===
Team	Pld	W	D	L	GF	GA	GD	Pts
Algeria	Qualified							
Libya	Qualified							
Tunisia	Withdrew							
Mauritania	Withdrew							

- Tunisia and Mauritania withdrew.
- Algeria and Libya qualified for finals.

=== Group D (East Region) ===
- Iraq banned

Team	Pld	W	D	L	GF	GA	GD	Pts
Syria	3	3	0	0	6	1	+5	9
Jordan	3	1	1	1	3	4	-1	4
Lebanon	3	1	0	2	3	4	-1	3
Palestine	3	0	1	2	3	6	-3	1

20 July 1998

Syria	3 - 0	Jordan

Lebanon

20 July 1998

Lebanon	3 - 1	Palestine

Lebanon

23 July 1998

Palestine	1 - 2	Syria

Lebanon

23 July 1998

Lebanon	0 - 2	Jordan

Lebanon

26 July 1998

Jordan	1 - 1	Palestine

Lebanon

26 July 1998

Lebanon	0 - 1	Syria

Lebanon
