= 2014–15 Yemeni League =

Yemeni League
- Season: 2014–15

The 2014–15 Yemeni League was the 23rd edition of top-level football in Yemen.

The season started on August 15, 2014, advanced by four months and was scheduled to finish in May 2015. The league was postponed after the 17th round with the last action of the season being on 17 January, a 1:0 victory for Al-Ittihad Ibb over Fahman Abyan. It was later cancelled due to the unsafe conditions in the country with the 2014–15 Yemeni coup d'état and subsequent Civil War.

== Teams ==
May 22 San'a, Al-Ahli Taizz, Al Sha'ab Sana'a and Al Rasheed Ta'izz were relegated to the second tier after finishing in the bottom four places of the 2013–14 season. They were replaced by Fahman Abyan, Al-Wahda Aden, Al-Wahda Sana'a and Al-Shula

=== Stadia and locations ===
Locations of teams in the 2014-15 Yemeni League

Club	Location	Stadium
Al-Tilal Aden	Aden	May 22 Stadium
Al-Sha'ab Hadramaut	Mukalla	Baradem Mukalla Stadium
Al-Ahli San'a	San'a	Ali Muhesen Stadium
Al-Oruba Zabid	San'a	Ali Muhesen Stadium
Al-Sha'ab Ibb	Ibb	
Al-Hilal Al-Sahili	Al Hudaydah	Al Ulufi Stadium
Al-Ittihad Ibb	Ibb	
Al Yarmuk Al Rawda	San'a	
Al-Wahda Aden	Aden	
Al Wahda San'a'	San'a	
Al-Shula	Aden	
Al Saqr Ta'izz	Ta'izz	
Shabab al-Jeel	Al Hudaydah	
Fahman Abyan	Zinjibar	

- Al Oruba appear to represent the small town of Zabid, but play all games in San'a'.

== League table ==
Table before season interrupted in January 2015 and subsequently abandoned.

Pos	Team	Pld	W	D	L	GF	GA	GD	Pts
1	Al-Ahli San'a'	16	10	3	3	29	15	+14	33
2	Al-Saqr	17	9	5	3	28	16	+12	32
3	Al Sha'ab Ibb	16	7	6	3	22	11	+11	27
4	Al-Tilal	15	6	4	5	21	18	+3	22
5	Al Wahda San'a'	16	5	6	5	16	15	+1	21
6	Al-Oruba Zabid	17	5	6	6	18	18	0	21
7	Al-Ittihad Ibb	15	7	0	8	18	24	−6	21
8	Al Yarmuk Al Rawda	15	5	5	5	20	14	+6	20
9	Al-Hilal Al-Sahili	16	5	5	6	26	21	+5	20
10	Al-Shula	16	4	8	4	18	21	−3	20
11	Fahman Abyan	16	5	4	7	13	17	−4	19
12	Al-Sha'ab Hadramaut	14	4	5	5	15	18	−3	17
13	Shabab al-Jeel	17	4	4	9	14	26	−12	16
14	Al-Wahda Aden	14	2	3	9	11	35	−24	9

Source: RSSSF
Rules for classification: 1) points; 2) goal difference; 3) number of goals scored.
