= 2013–14 Yemeni League =

22nd season of the Yemeni League

Yemeni League
- Season: 2013–14
- Champions: Al-Saqr
- Matches: 182
- Goals: 421 (2.31 per match)

The 2013–14 Yemeni League is the 22nd edition of top-level football in Yemen.

The season started on December 20, 2013, and finished in May 2014. The schedule has been brought forward again in time to finish prior to the 2014 FIFA World Cup.

== Teams ==
Al-Tali'aa Taizz, Al-Wahda Aden, Al Wahda San'a' and Al-Shula were relegated to the second tier after finishing in the bottom four places of the 2013 Yemeni League season. They were replaced by May 22 Sana'a, Al-Ahli Taizz, Al Sha'ab Sana'a and Shabab al-Jeel.

=== Stadia and locations ===
Locations of teams in the 2013-14 Yemeni League

| Club | Location | Stadium |
|---|---|---|
| Al-Tilal Aden | Aden | May 22 Stadium |
| Al-Sha'ab Hadramaut | Mukalla | Baradem Mukalla Stadium |
| Al-Ahli San'a | San'a | Ali Muhesen Stadium |
| Al-Ahli Ta'izz | Ta'izz | |
| Al-Oruba Zabid | San'a | Ali Muhesen Stadium |
| Al-Sha'ab Ibb | Ibb | |
| Al-Sha'ab Sana'a | San'a' | |
| Al-Hilal Al-Sahili | Al Hudaydah | Al Ulufi Stadium |
| Al-Ittihad Ibb | Ibb | |
| Al Yarmuk Al Rawda | San'a | |
| Al Saqr Ta'izz | Ta'izz | |
| Al Rasheed Ta'izz | Ta'izz | |
| May 22 San'a | San'a | |
| Shabab al-Jeel | Al Hudaydah | |

- Al Oruba appear to represent the small town of Zabid, but play all games in San'a'.

== League standings ==
| Pos | Team | Pld | W | D | L | GF | GA | GD | Pts |
|---|---|---|---|---|---|---|---|---|---|
| 1 | Al-Saqr | 26 | 20 | 5 | 1 | 50 | 14 | +36 | 65 |
| 2 | Al-Ahli San'a' | 26 | 17 | 4 | 5 | 45 | 25 | +20 | 55 |
| 3 | Al-Tilal | 26 | 12 | 7 | 7 | 41 | 24 | +17 | 43 |
| 4 | Al-Ittihad Ibb | 26 | 11 | 9 | 6 | 32 | 30 | +2 | 42 |
| 5 | Al-Oruba Zabid | 26 | 9 | 11 | 6 | 21 | 15 | +6 | 38 |
| 6 | Al Yarmuk Al Rawda | 26 | 10 | 7 | 9 | 38 | 29 | +9 | 37 |
| 7 | Shabab al-Jeel | 26 | 9 | 10 | 7 | 31 | 27 | +4 | 37 |
| 8 | Al-Sha'ab Hadramaut | 26 | 9 | 7 | 10 | 36 | 33 | +3 | 34 |
| 9 | Al-Hilal Al-Sahili | 26 | 8 | 10 | 8 | 28 | 35 | −7 | 34 |
| 10 | Al Sha'ab Ibb | 26 | 8 | 7 | 11 | 28 | 30 | −2 | 31 |
| 11 | Al Sha'ab Sana'a | 26 | 5 | 8 | 13 | 15 | 35 | −20 | 23 |
| 12 | Al Rasheed Ta'izz | 26 | 4 | 8 | 14 | 16 | 36 | −20 | 20 |
| 13 | Al-Ahli Taizz | 26 | 3 | 8 | 15 | 18 | 36 | −18 | 17 |
| 14 | May 22 Sana'a | 26 | 3 | 7 | 16 | 22 | 52 | −30 | 16 |

Source: Futbol24
Rules for classification: 1) points; 2) goal difference; 3) number of goals scored.
