= 2011–12 Yemeni League =

Yemeni League
- Season: 2011–12
- Champions: Al-Shaab Ibb
- Relegated: Najm Sba; Al-Ahli Ta'izz; Al Sha'ab Sana'a; Shabab Al Baydaa
- AFC Cup: Al-Shaab Ibb; Al-Ahli Ta'izz
- Matches: 182
- Goals: 392 (2.15 per match)
- Top goalscorer: Shaaban Naggar (14)
- Highest scoring: Al Sha'ab Ibb 6-0 Shabab Al Baydaa (18 May 2012)

The 2011–12 Yemeni League is the 20th edition of top-level football in Yemen.

The season started on 28 December between last season's top two teams; Al-Tilal Aden and Al-Oruba Zabid and finished on 16 July. The season was due to finish on 15 July but the final two games of the season were postponed until the next day due to heavy rainfall. The deciding games featured the top three sides of the league and decided who would be champions. The league winners and runners up qualify for the AFC Cup. The bottom four teams will be relegated.

== Teams ==
Al-Wahda San'a', Hassan Abyan, Al-Saqr and Al Rasheed Ta'izz were relegated to the second tier after finishing in the bottom four places of the 2010–11 Yemeni League season. They were replaced by Al-Wahda Aden, Al-Shula, Al-Tali'aa Taizz and Najm Sba. Three teams would each represent the capital San'a and the city of Aden bringing some big rivalries to the domestic game.

=== Stadia and locations ===
Locations of teams in the 2011-12 Yemeni League

Club	Location	Stadium
Al-Tilal Aden	Aden	May 22 Stadium
Al-Sha'ab Hadramaut	Mukalla	Baradem Mukalla Stadium
Al-Ahli San'a	San'a	Ali Muhesen Stadium
Shabab Al Baydaa	Al Bayda'	
Al-Oruba Zabid	San'a	Ali Muhesen Stadium|
Al-Ahli Ta'izz	Ta'izz	
Al-Wahda Aden	Aden	
Al-Sha'ab Ibb	Ibb	
Al-Hilal Al-Sahili	Al Hudaydah	Al Ulufi Stadium
Al-Sha'ab Sana'a	San'a'	
Al-Ittihad Ibb	Ibb	
Al-Shula	Aden	
Al-Tali'aa Taizz	Ta'izz	
Najm Sba	Dhamar	

- Al Oruba appear to represent the small town of Zabid, but play all games in San'a'.

== League standings ==
Pos	Team	Pld	W	D	L	GF	GA	GD	Pts	Qualification or relegation
1	Al Sha'ab Ibb	26	13	9	4	39	20	+19	48	Championship playoff
2	Al-Ittihad Ibb	26	14	6	6	28	20	+8	48	Championship playoff
3	Al-Oruba Zabid	26	13	7	6	38	20	+18	46	
4	Al-Ahli San'a'	26	12	7	7	34	29	+5	43	
5	Al-Hilal Al-Sahili	26	11	7	8	31	30	+1	40	
6	Al-Sha'ab Hadramaut	26	11	5	10	31	30	+1	38	
7	Al-Tali'aa Taizz	26	11	4	11	27	22	+5	37	
8	Al-Shula	26	9	9	8	29	19	+10	36	
9	Al-Wahda Aden	26	10	4	12	31	34	−3	34	
10	Al-Tilal	26	8	9	9	20	26	−6	33	
11	Shabab Al Baydaa	26	9	4	13	27	38	−11	31	Relegation to the Yemeni Second Division
12	Al Sha'ab Sana'a	26	7	5	14	16	28	−12	26	Relegation to the Yemeni Second Division
13	Al-Ahli Taizz	26	5	8	13	25	35	−10	23	AFC Cup qualifying and relegation to Second Division (Note: Al-Ahli Ta'izz qualified for the 2013 AFC Cup as the 2012 Yemeni President Cup winners.)
14	Najm Sba	26	4	6	16	16	41	−25	18	Relegation to the Yemeni Second Division

Updated to match(es) played on 16 July 2011. Source: goalzz.com
Rules for classification: 1) points; 2) goal difference; 3) number of goals scored.

== Championship playoff ==
Because the top two teams finish with the same number of points, a championship playoff was played to determine the champions of Yemen for 2011–2012 season.

25 July 2012
20:00 UTC+03:00

Al-Shaab Ibb	3 - 2	Al-Ittihad Ibb
Gaems 15' 53'; Radwan 50'		Jelani 6'; Al-Gerani 29'

Ali Muhesen Stadium, Sana‘a

As league champions, Al-Shaab Ibb qualified for the 2013 AFC Cup Group stage.

== Awards and season statistics ==
=== Top goalscorers ===
Rank	Scorer	Club	Goals
1	(Egypt) Shaaban Naggar	Al Oruba	14
2	(Yemen) Ali Al-Nono	Al-Ahli (San'a')	12
3	(Yemen) Emad Mansoor	Al-Tali'aa Taizz	12
4	(Yemen) Kameel Tareq	Al-Shula	10
5	(Yemen) Tedy Gaems	Al-Shaab Ibb	10
6	(Yemen) Gamal Al Hebh	Al-Shula	9
7	(Yemen) Shadi Jamal	Al-Ahli Ta'izz	9

Source: goalzz
