= 2013 Yemeni League =

Yemeni League
- Season: 2013
- Champions: Al-Yarmuk
- Matches: 182
- Goals: 445 (2.45 per match)

The 2013 Yemeni League was the 21st edition of top-level football in Yemen.

The season started on February 28 and finished on 8 July, played in one calendar year rather than the previous editions which have been played over two calendar years.

== Teams ==
Shabab Al Baydaa, Al Sha'ab Sana'a, Al-Ahli Taizz and Najm Sba were relegated to the second tier after finishing in the bottom four places of the 2011–12 Yemeni League season. They were replaced by Al-Wahda San'a', Al Yarmuk Al Rawda, Al-Saqr and Al Rasheed Ta'izz.

Al Rasheed and Al Saqr are back after withdrawing from the 2010–11 League campaign. Al-Wahda San'a' are back after one season out of the top flight and Al Yarmuk return, last being in the top flight back in the 2009–10 league season.

=== Stadia and locations ===
Locations of teams in the 2011-12 Yemeni League

Club	Location	Stadium
Al-Tilal Aden	Aden	May 22 Stadium
Al-Sha'ab Hadramaut	Mukalla	Baradem Mukalla Stadium
Al-Ahli San'a	San'a	Ali Muhesen Stadium
Al-Oruba Zabid	San'a	Ali Muhesen Stadium
Al-Wahda Aden	Aden	
Al-Sha'ab Ibb	Ibb	
Al-Hilal Al-Sahili	Al Hudaydah	Al Ulufi Stadium
Al-Ittihad Ibb	Ibb	
Al-Shula	Aden	
Al-Tali'aa Taizz	Ta'izz	
Al Yarmuk Al Rawda	San'a	
Al Wahda San'a'	San'a	
Al Saqr Ta'izz	Ta'izz	
Al Rasheed Ta'izz	Ta'izz	

- Al Oruba appear to represent the small town of Zabid, but play all games in San'a'.

== League standings ==
Pos	Team	Pld	W	D	L	GF	GA	GD	Pts	
1	Al Yarmuk Al Rawda (C)	26	14	7	5	35	17	+18	49	Qualification for the AFC Cup qualifying play-off
2	Al-Sha'ab Hadramaut	26	14	4	8	42	29	+13	46	
3	Al-Saqr	26	12	10	4	35	24	+11	46	
4	Al-Ahli San'a'	26	12	5	9	40	31	+9	41	
5	Al-Oruba Zabid	26	10	8	8	31	24	+7	38	
6	Al Sha'ab Ibb	26	10	7	9	31	33	−2	37	
7	Al Rasheed Ta'izz	26	9	9	8	25	22	+3	36	
8	Al-Ittihad Ibb	26	10	6	10	35	38	−3	36	
9	Al-Tilal	26	9	8	9	35	32	+3	35	
10	Al-Hilal Al-Sahili	26	10	5	11	27	35	−8	35	
11	Al-Wahda San'a' (R)	26	8	6	12	34	32	+2	30	Relegation to Yemeni Second Divisions
12	Al-Shula (R)	26	7	7	12	29	39	−10	28	Relegation to Yemeni Second Divisions
13	Al-Wahda Aden (R)	26	5	11	10	27	38	−11	26	Relegation to Yemeni Second Divisions
14	Al-Tali'aa Taizz (R)	26	2	7	17	19	51	−32	13	Relegation to Yemeni Second Divisions

Source: RSSSF
Rules for classification: 1) points; 2) goal difference; 3) number of goals scored.
(C) Champions; (R) Relegated
