= 2010–11 Yemeni League =

Yemeni League
- Season: 2010–11
- Champions: Al Oruba
- Top goalscorer: (Ethiopia) Tesfaye Tafese (15 goals)
- Highest scoring: Shabab Al Baydaa 4-0 Al-Hilal (27 July 2011)

The 2010–11 Yemeni League was the 19th edition of top-level football in Yemen.

The season started in November 2010 and lasted until June 2011. The league winners qualified for the AFC Cup. The bottom four teams were relegated.

== Teams ==
Al-Shula, Al-Wahda Aden, Salam Al-Garfa and Al Yarmuk Al Rawda were relegated to the second tier after finishing in the bottom four places of the 2009–10 Yemeni League season. They were replaced by Al-Sha'ab Hadramaut, Hassan Abyan, Al Rasheed Ta'izz and Al Sha'ab Sana'a.

Three teams represented the capital San'a and the city of Ta'izz, bringing big rivalries to the game.

=== Stadia and locations ===
Locations of teams in the 2010-11 Yemeni League

Club	Location	Stadium
Al-Saqr Ta'izz	Ta'izz	
Al-Tilal Aden	Aden	May 22 Stadium
Al-Sha'ab Hadramaut	Mukalla	Baradem Mukalla Stadium
Al-Ahli San'a	San'a	Ali Muhesen Stadium
Shabab Al Baydaa	Al Bayda'	
Al-Oruba Zabid	Zabid	
Al-Ahli Ta'izz	Ta'izz	
Al-Wahda San'a	San'a	
Al Sha'ab Ibb	Ibb	
Al-Hilal Al-Sahili	Al Hudaydah	
Hassan Abyan	Zinjibar	
Al Sha'ab Sana'a	San'a'	
Al-Ittihad Ibb	Ibb	
Al Rasheed Ta'izz	Ta'izz	

== League standings ==
Pos	Team	Pld	W	D	L	GF	GA	GD	Pts	Qualification or relegation
1	Al-Oruba Zabid	20	13	5	2	36	18	+18	44	2012 AFC Cup group stage
2	Al-Tilal	20	10	5	5	28	19	+9	35	2012 AFC Cup qualifying play-off (Note: Runners-up qualified for the 2012 AFC Cup as the Yemeni President Cup was not played in 2011.)
3	Al-Ahli San'a'	20	9	4	7	26	17	+9	31	
4	Al Sha'ab Sana'a	20	8	5	7	19	23	−4	29	
5	Al-Hilal Al-Sahili	20	7	7	6	18	17	+1	28	
6	Al-Sha'ab Hadramaut	20	7	6	7	17	22	−5	27	
7	Al-Ittihad Ibb	20	7	5	8	22	22	0	26	
8	Al Sha'ab Ibb	20	6	6	8	15	22	−7	24	
9	Al-Ahli Ta'izz	20	5	8	7	13	14	−1	23	
10	Shabab Al Baydaa	20	5	7	8	21	24	−3	22	
11	Al-Wahda San'a'	20	3	2	15	10	27	−17	11	Relegation
12	Hassan Abyan	0	0	0	0	0	0	0	0	Withdrew
13	Al-Saqr	0	0	0	0	0	0	0	0	Withdrew
14	Al Rasheed Ta'izz	0	0	0	0	0	0	0	0	Withdrew

Updated to match(es) played on 26 July 2011. Source: Soccerway.com and rsssf.com
Rules for classification: 1) points; 2) goal difference; 3) number of goals scored.

== Season statistics ==
=== Top scorers ===
Rank	Scorer	Club	Goals
1	(Ethiopia) Tesfaye Tafese	Al-Tilal	15
2	(Ethiopia) Yordanos Abay	Al-Saqr	9
3	(Yemen) Ali Al-Nono	Al-Ahli San'a'	9
