= Muaadh Abdulkhalek =

Yemeni footballer (born 1972)

Mu'aadh Abdulkhalek
Personal information
- Full name: Mu'aadh Abdulkhalek
- Date of birth: 2 January 1972 (age 54)
- Place of birth: Abyan, Yemen
- Height: 1.88 m (6 ft 2 in)
- Position: Goalkeeper

Youth career
- 1988–1990: Al-Ahli San'a'

Senior career*
Years	Team	Apps	(Gls)
1990–2009	Al-Ahli San'a'		
2010–2013	Al-Oruba		

International career^{‡}
1990	Yemen U23		
1996–2006	Yemen	18	(0)
- * Club domestic league appearances and goals as of 00:00, 10 October 2011 (UTC) ‡ National team caps and goals as of 00:00, 20 September 2008(UTC)

Mu'aadh Abdulkhalek (Arabic: معاذ عبدالخالق; born 2 January 1972) is a Yemeni former football goalkeeper who last played for Al-Oruba in the Yemeni League.

== Honours ==
=== Club ===
Al-Ahli San'a

- Yemeni League: 6

1991–92 ، 1993–94 ، 1998–99 ، 1999–00 ، 2000–01، 2006–07

- Yemeni President Cup: 3

2001, 2004, 2009

- Yemeni Super Cup: 3

2007, 2008, 2009

- Yemeni Unity Cup: 1

2004
Runner-up: 1999

- Esteghlal Cup: 1

2006

Al-Oruba

- Yemeni League: 1

2010–11

- Yemeni Super Cup: 1

2011
