= 2008–09 Yemeni League =

Yemeni League
- Season: 2008–09
- Dates: 7 November 2008 – 27 June 2009
- Champions: Al-Hilal Al-Sahili
- Relegated: Al Sha'ab Sana'a; Al Rasheed Ta'izz; Hassan Abyan; Al-Sha'ab Hadramaut
- AFC Cup: Al-Hilal Al-Sahili; Al-Ahli Club San'a'
- Matches: 182
- Goals: 375 (2.06 per match)
- Top goalscorer: (Ethiopia) Lomi Antita (13 goals)

The 2008–09 Yemeni League was the 17th edition of the Yemeni League, the top-level football league in Yemen.

Al-Hilal Al-Sahili won the championship on the final day of the season. Along with runners-up Al-Ahli Club San'a', they qualified for the 2010 AFC Cup.

== Final table ==
Pos	Team	Pld	W	D	L	GF	GA	GD	Pts	Qualification or relegation
1	Al-Hilal Al-Sahili (C)	26	17	5	4	37	12	+25	56	2010 AFC Cup
2	Al-Ahli San'a'	26	17	4	5	48	24	+24	55	2010 AFC Cup
3	Al-Saqr	26	11	10	5	31	20	+11	43	
4	Al-Shula	26	9	9	8	32	31	+1	36	
5	Al-Wahda Aden	26	10	6	10	27	34	−7	36	
6	Shabab Al Baydaa	26	8	10	8	27	18	+9	34	
7	Al Yarmuk Al Rawda	26	8	10	8	21	20	+1	34	
8	Al Sha'ab Ibb	26	7	12	7	28	25	+3	33	
9	Al-Tilal	26	8	9	9	21	27	−6	33	
10	Al-Ittihad Ibb	26	7	11	8	20	21	−1	32	
11	Al-Sha'ab Hadramaut (R)	26	8	6	12	32	33	−1	30	Relegation
12	Hassan Abyan (R)	26	7	9	10	22	28	−6	30	Relegation
13	Al Rasheed Ta'izz (R)	26	3	11	12	9	34	−25	20	Relegation
14	Al Sha'ab Sana'a (R)	26	3	6	17	20	48	−28	15	Relegation

Source: RSSSF
Rules for classification: 1) points; 2) goal difference; 3) number of goals scored.
(C) Champions; (R) Relegated
