= Ali Al-Nono =

Yemeni footballer

Personal information
- Full name: Ali Mohammed Mohammed Al-Nono
- Date of birth: 7 June 1980 (age 46)
- Place of birth: Yemen
- Height: 1.69 m (5 ft 7 in)
- Position: Striker

Youth career
- 1995–1998: Al-Ahli San'a'

Senior career*
Years	Team	Apps	(Gls)
1998	Al-Masry		
1998–2005	Al-Ahli San'a'		
2004	Al-Sha'ab Ibb (loan)		
2005	Al-Merreikh		
2006	Busaiteen		
2006–2007	Tishreen		
2007–2010	Al-Ahli San'a'		
2010–2011	Al-Tilal		
2011–2014	Al-Ahli San'a'		

International career^{‡}
2000–2010	Yemen	66	(30)
- * Club domestic league appearances and goals ‡ National team caps and goals as of 30/1/2024

Ali Al-Nono (Arabic: علي النونو, born 7 June 1980) is a Yemeni former professional footballer who played as a striker. He was the captain of the Yemen national football team, and is the all-time highest goalscorer in the history of the Yemeni League.

== Club career stats ==
Club	Season	League			Cup		Continental		Total	
Club	Season	Division	Apps	Goals	Apps	Goals	Apps	Goals	Apps	Goals
Al-Ahli Sana'a	1999-00	Yemeni League								
Al-Ahli Sana'a	2000-01	Yemeni League		24						24
Al-Ahli Sana'a	2001-02	Yemeni League		14						14
Al-Ahli Sana'a	2002-03	Yemeni League								
Al-Ahli Sana'a	2003-04	Yemeni League		14						14
Al-Ahli Sana'a	2006-07	Yemeni League		9						9
Al-Ahli Sana'a	2007-08	Yemeni League		15			6	2		17
Al-Ahli Sana'a	2008-09	Yemeni League		11						11
Al-Ahli Sana'a	2009-10	Yemeni League		12			4	1		13
Al-Ahli Sana'a	2010-11	Yemeni League		8						8
Al-Ahli Sana'a	2011-12	Yemeni League	26	12					26	12
Al-Ahli Sana'a	Total			119			10	3		122
Al-Shaab Ibb	2003–04	Yemeni League					1	1	1	1
Al-Merreikh	2004–05	Sudan Premier League		6				1		7
Busaiteen	2005–06	Bahraini Premier League		1						1
Tishreen	2006–07	Syrian Premier League		2						2
Al-Tilal	2010–11	Yemeni League		1						1
Career total				129				5		134

== International goals ==
Al-Nono scored 30 international goals and is currently the all-time top scorer of the Yemen national team.

List of international goals scored by Ali Al-Nono
No.	Date	Venue	Opponent	Score	Result	Competition
1	10 February 2000	Kuwait City	Nepal	2–0	3–0	2000 AFC Asian Nations Cup qualification
2	18 February 2000	Kuwait City	Bhutan	2–0	11–2	2000 AFC Asian Nations Cup qualification
3	18 February 2000	Kuwait City	Bhutan	8–2	11–2	2000 AFC Asian Nations Cup qualification
4	18 February 2000	Kuwait City	Bhutan	10–2	11–2	2000 AFC Asian Nations Cup qualification
5	7 April 2001	Bandar Seri Begawan	Brunei	4–0	5–0	2002 FIFA World Cup qualification
6	7 April 2001	Bandar Seri Begawan	Brunei	5–0	5–0	2002 FIFA World Cup qualification
7	11 May 2001	Sana'a	United Arab Emirates	2–1	2–1	2002 FIFA World Cup qualification
8	18 May 2001	Al Ain City	United Arab Emirates	1–1	2–3	2002 FIFA World Cup qualification
9	26 August 2004	Sana'a	Syria	1–1	1–2	Friendly
10	8 September 2004	Sana'a	United Arab Emirates	1–0	3–1	2006 FIFA World Cup qualification
11	8 September 2004	Sana'a	United Arab Emirates	3–1	3–1	2006 FIFA World Cup qualification
12	1 November 2004	Abu Dhabi	Zambia	1–2 (P)	2–2	Friendly
13	1 March 2006	New Delhi	India	3–0	3–0	2007 AFC Asian Nations Cup qualification
14	15 November 2006	Sana'a	India	2–1	2–1	2007 AFC Asian Nations Cup qualification
15	9 November 2007	Sana'a	Thailand	1–1	1–1	2010 FIFA World Cup qualification
16	28 December 2008	Sana'a	Zimbabwe	1–0	1–0	Friendly
17	5 January 2009	Muscat, Oman	United Arab Emirates	1–3	1–3	2009 Gulf Cup
18	11 January 2009	Muscat, Oman	Qatar	1–1 (P)	1–2	2009 Gulf Cup
19	30 December 2009	Sana'a	Tajikistan	2–1	2–1	Friendly
20	15 January 2010	Sana'a	Kenya	1–1	3–1	Friendly
21	20 January 2010	Sana'a	Bahrain	1–0	3–0	2011 AFC Asian Nations Cup qualification
22	20 January 2010	Sana'a	Bahrain	2–0	3–0	2011 AFC Asian Nations Cup qualification
23	7 September 2010	Sana'a	Syria	1–0 (P)	2–1	Friendly
24	7 September 2010	Sana'a	Syria	2–1	2–1	Friendly
25	25 September 2010	Amman	Iraq	1–0	1–2	2010 WAFF Championship
26	27 September 2010	Amman	Palestine	1–0	3–1	2010 WAFF Championship
27	27 September 2010	Amman	Palestine	3–1	3–1	2010 WAFF Championship
28	1 October 2010	Amman	Kuwait	1–0	1–1	2010 WAFF Championship
29	7 November 2010	Sana'a	Uganda	1–0	2–2	Friendly
30	7 November 2010	Sana'a	Uganda	2–0	2–2	Friendly

== Honours ==
Al-Ahli San'a'

- Yemeni League: 1998–99, 1999–00, 2000–01
- Yemeni President Cup: 2001, 2009
- Yemeni Unity Cup: 2004

Individual

- Yemen League Top Scorer: 2007–08 (11 goals)
