= 1997–98 Yemeni League =

Yemeni League
- Season: 1997–98
- Champions: Al-Wehda
- Matches: 132
- Goals: 415 (3.14 per match)

The statistics of the Yemeni League in the 1997–98 season.

== Results ==
Pos	Team	Pld	W	D	L	GF	GA	GD	Pts	Relegation
1	Al-Wahda Sana'a	22	15	3	4	56	21	+35	48	
2	Al-Ahli Sana	22	14	5	3	46	13	+33	47	
3	Al-Shoala Aden	22	13	5	4	46	28	+18	44	
4	Al-Sha'ab Ibb	22	13	4	5	42	26	+16	43	
5	Hassan	22	12	4	6	37	26	+11	40	
6	Al-Sha'ab Hadramaut	22	7	7	8	35	38	−3	28	
7	Al-Tilal	22	8	3	11	38	42	−4	27	
8	Al-Ittihad Ibb	22	7	5	10	28	33	−5	26	
9	Al-Zohra	22	7	3	12	27	33	−6	24	
10	Al-Tali'aa Taizz	22	5	3	14	23	56	−33	18	
11	Al-Ahli Hudayda	22	3	7	12	15	31	−16	16	Relegated
12	Shamsan	22	3	1	18	22	64	−42	10	Relegated

Source: rsssf.com
