= 1993–94 Yemeni League =

Yemeni League
- Season: 1993–94
- Dates: 26 August 1993 – 12 November 1994
- Champions: Al-Ahli
- Relegated: Al-Shaab Ibb; Al-Ahli Taizz; Al-Sha'ab Sana'a; Al-Yarmuk Sana'a
- Matches: 182
- Biggest win: Shamsan Aden 7–0 Al Sha'ab Sana'a

Statistics of the Yemeni League in the 1993–94 season. It was the season when the league first allowed foreign professional players to play in the competition.

== Results ==
Pos	Team	Pld	W	D	L	GF	GA	GD	Pts	Relegation
1	Al-Ahli Sana'a (C)	26	18	7	1	42	8	+34	43	
2	Hassan Abyan	26	12	11	3	35	18	+17	35	
3	Al-Wehda Aden	26	13	8	5	52	31	+21	34	
4	Al-Wehda Sana'a	26	13	7	6	43	24	+19	33	
5	Al-Tilal	26	11	11	4	42	30	+12	33	
6	Al-Zohra	26	8	9	9	34	29	+5	25	
7	Shamsan	26	9	7	10	30	29	+1	25	
8	Al-Tali'aa Taizz	26	9	7	10	33	45	−12	25	
9	Al-Shurta Aden	26	8	8	10	28	31	−3	24	
10	Al-Shula	26	8	8	10	28	32	−4	24	
11	Al-Shaab Ibb (R)	26	7	9	10	28	30	−2	23	Relegated
12	Al-Yarmuk Sana'a (R)	26	5	8	13	17	37	−20	18	Relegated
13	Al-Sha'ab Sana'a (R)	26	3	6	17	17	56	−39	12	Relegated
14	Al-Ahli Taizz (R)	26	2	6	18	8	37	−29	10	Relegated

Source: RSSSF
(C) Champions; (R) Relegated

== Top scorers ==
Rank	Player	Club	Goals
1	Muhammad Al-Azazy	Al-Zohra	19
2	Baligh Abdullah Numan	Al-Tilal	18
3	(Yemen) Jiab Bashafaay	Hassan Abyan	16

Source: RSSSF
