= 1996–97 Yemeni League =

Yemeni League
- Season: 1996–97
- Champions: Al Wahda Sana'a'
- Relegated: Al Sha'ab Sana'a; Al-Wahda (Aden)
- AFC Cup: Al Wahda Sana'a'
- Goals: 367

The 1996–97 Yemeni League is the fifth edition of top-level football in Yemen. The season started in November 1996 and ended in June 1997. Al Wahda Sana'a' won the title.

== Teams ==
A total of twelve teams contested the league, including teen sides from the 1994–95 season and two promoted teams from the 1994–95 ??? league. Al-Taliya Taizz and Al-Shurta Aden were relegated from 1994 to 1995 Yemeni League after finishing the season in the bottom two places of the league table. 1994–95 ??? League champions Al-Ittihad (Ibb) and runners-up Al Sha'ab Sana'a secured direct promotion to the Yemeni League.

== Stadia and locations ==
Locations of teams in the 1996-97 Yemeni League

Club	Location	Stadium
Al-Ahli	Sana'a	Ali Muhesen Stadium
Al-Ahly Hudaida	Al Hudaydah	
Al-Ittihad	Ibb	
Al-Shaab Hadramout	Mukalla	
Al Sha'ab Sana'a	Sana'a	
Al-Shula	Aden	
Al-Tilal SC	Aden	
Al-Wahda (Aden)	Aden	
Al-Wahda Club (San'a')	Sana'a	
Al-Zohra	Sana'a	
Hassan Abyan	Abyan	
Shamsan	Aden	

== League table ==
Pos.	Team	Pld.	Pts.
1	Al-Wahda Club (San'a') (C)	22	42
2	Al-Tilal SC	22	39
3	Al-Ahly Hudaida	22	37
???	Al-Zohra Sana'a	22	???
???	Shamsan Aden	22	???
???	Al-Shaab Hadramout (Mukalla)	22	???
???	Al-Shula	22	???
???	Al-Ittihad (Ibb)	22	???
???	Al-Ahli Club San'a'	22	???
???	Hassan Abyan	22	???
???	Al Sha'ab Sana'a (R)	22	???
???	Al-Wahda (Aden) (R)	22	???

== Season statistics ==
=== Top scorers ===
Rank	Player	Club	Goals
1	Jameel Al-Maktry	Shamsan Aden	21
2	Omar Abdul Hafeez	Al-Zohra Sana'a	15
3	Khalid Al-Akbari	Al-Shaab Hadramout	11
