= Adel Al-Salimi =

Yemeni footballer

Personal information
- Full name: Adel Ali Al-Salimi
- Date of birth: 6 July 1979 (age 47)
- Place of birth: Saada, Yemen
- Height: 1.85 m (6 ft 1 in)
- Position: Forward

Youth career
- 1992–1996: Al-Ahli San'a'

Senior career*
Years	Team	Apps	(Gls)
1997–2008	Al-Ahli San'a'		
2004–2005	→ Dhofar (loan)		
2008–2009	Al-Rasheed Ta'izz		
2009–2010	Al-Wahda San'a'		
2009–2011	Al-Tilal		

International career
2002	Yemen U23	3	(2)
2000–2004	Yemen	25	(15)
- * Club domestic league appearances and goals

Adel Ali Al-Salimi (Arabic: عادل السالمي, born 6 July 1979) is a Yemeni former footballer who played as a forward. His goal tally for the Yemeni national team is the second-best ever, behind Ali Al-Nono.

== Career statistics ==
=== International ===
Appearances and goals by national team and year
National team	Year	Apps	Goals
Yemen	2000	4	3
Yemen	2001	6	5
Yemen	2002	4	2
Yemen	2003	9	5
Yemen	2004	2	0
Total		25	15

Scores and results list Yemen's goal tally first, score column indicates score after each Al-Salimi goal.

List of international goals scored by Adel Al-Salimi
No.	Date	Venue	Opponent	Score	Result	Competition
1	10 February 2000	Mohammed al-Hamad Stadium, Hawally, Kuwait	Nepal	3–0	3–0	2000 AFC Asian Cup qualification
2	18 February 2000	Mohammed al-Hamad Stadium, Hawally, Kuwait	Bhutan	3–0	11–2	2000 AFC Asian Cup qualification
3	18 February 2000	Mohammed al-Hamad Stadium, Hawally, Kuwait	Bhutan	7–2	11–2	2000 AFC Asian Cup qualification
4	7 April 2001	Hassanal Bolkiah National Stadium, Bandar Seri Begawan, Brunei	Brunei	2–0	5–0	2002 FIFA World Cup qualification
5	4 May 2001	Althawra Sports City Stadium, Sanaa, Yemen	India	1–0	2–2	2002 FIFA World Cup qualification
6	4 May 2001	Althawra Sports City Stadium, Sanaa, Yemen	India	2–1	2–2	2002 FIFA World Cup qualification
7	4 May 2001	Althawra Sports City Stadium, Sanaa, Yemen	India	3–3	2–2	2002 FIFA World Cup qualification
8	18 May 2001	Sheikh Khalifa International Stadium, Al Ain, United Arab Emirates	United Arab Emirates	2–3	2–3	2002 FIFA World Cup qualification
9	21 December 2002	Al Kuwait Sports Club Stadium, Kuwait City, Kuwait	Bahrain	1–2	1–3	2002 Arab Cup
10	26 December 2002	Al Kuwait Sports Club Stadium, Kuwait City, Kuwait	Saudi Arabia	1–0	2–2	2002 Arab Cup
11	10 October 2003	Prince Abdullah Al-Faisal Sports City Stadium, Jeddah, Saudi Arabia	Bhutan	5–0	8–0	2004 AFC Asian Cup qualification
12	10 October 2003	Prince Abdullah Al-Faisal Sports City Stadium, Jeddah, Saudi Arabia	Bhutan	8–0	8–0	2004 AFC Asian Cup qualification
13	15 October 2003	Prince Abdullah Al-Faisal Sports City Stadium, Jeddah, Saudi Arabia	Indonesia	1–0	2–2	2004 AFC Asian Cup qualification
14	17 October 2003	Prince Abdullah Al-Faisal Sports City Stadium, Jeddah, Saudi Arabia	Bhutan	4–0	4–0	2004 AFC Asian Cup qualification
15	30 December 2003	Al Kuwait Sports Club Stadium, Kuwait City, Kuwait	Bahrain	1–1	1–5	16th Arabian Gulf Cup

== Honours ==
=== Club ===
Al-Ahli San'a'

- Yemeni League: 3

1998–99, 1999–00, 2000–01

- Yemeni President Cup: 2

2001, 2004

- Yemeni Unity Cup: 1

2004

- Esteghlal Cup: 1

2006
