= 2025–26 Yemeni League =

Yemeni League
- Season: 2025–26
- Dates: 30 April 2026 –
- Country: Yemen
- Teams: 14
- Matches: 75
- Goals: 157 (2.09 per match)
- Top goalscorer: Omar Al-Golan; Haider Aslam (7 goals)
- All statistics correct as of 13 August 2026.

The 2025–26 Yemeni League, officially known as the Yemeni First Division League, began on 30 April 2026. The season features 14 participating clubs. The tournament is contested in a home-and-away round-robin format, for the first time since 2014.

The draw for the tournament was held on 17 January, with the competition initially scheduled to begin on 22 January. However, the clubs requested additional preparation time, which led to the postponement of the start until after Ramadan. On 3 April, the tournament was postponed once again, after it had been planned to start on 9 April.

On 26 April 2026, the Yemen Football Association approved the official match schedule. The league season was halted on 22 May after round four, with resumption originally scheduled for 11 June due to Eid al-Adha observances and an international fixture involving the Yemeni national team in AFC Asian Cup qualifying. The suspension period was later extended through 25 June.

== Teams ==
Promoted from the second division	Relegated to the second division
Al Mukalla	Al-Saqr
Al Sadd	Al-Tali'aa Taizz
Ittihad Hadramout	Samaoon
Shabab Al Bayda	Shaab Ibb

=== Locations and Stadiums ===
-

Team	Stadium	City	Capacity
Al Sadd	Marib Stadium	Marib	5,000
Shabab Al Bayda	Al-Tharafi Stadium	Sanaa	
Al-Oruba	Al-Tharafi Stadium	Sanaa	
Ittihad Hadramout	Seiyun Stadium	Seiyun	20,000
Al Ittihad Ibb	Ittihad Ibb Stadium	Ibb	30,000
Al-Shaab Hadramaut	Baradem Stadium	Mukalla	15,000
Fahman	Fahman Stadium	Mudiyah	2,000
Salam Al-Garfa	Seiyun Stadium	Seiyun, Al-Ghurfah	20,000
Al-Tadamun Hadramaut	Baradem Stadium	Mukalla	15,000
Al Mukalla	Baradem Stadium	Mukalla	15,000
Al-Wehda Sanaa	Al-Tharafi Stadium	Sanaa	
Ahli Sanaa	Al-Tharafi Stadium	Sanaa	
Al-Yarmuk	Al-Tharafi Stadium	Sanaa	
Hilal Hodeidah	Al Olofi Stadium	Hodeidah	

=== Managerial changes ===
Team	Outgoing Manager	Manner of Departure	Date of Vacancy	Position in the table	Incoming Manager	Date of Appointment
Ahli Sanaa	–	–	–	Pre-season	(Egypt) Ekrami Matbouli	14 March 2026
Al-Tadamun Hadramaut	(Yemen) Al-Khader Fadl Al-Salehi	End of interim spell	3 May 2026	4th	(Egypt) Alaa Fathallah	3 May 2026
Al-Wehda Sanaa	(Yemen) Ibrahim Al-Kahali	End of interim spell	17 May 2026	4th	(Yemen) Haitham Al-Asbahi	17 May 2026
Al Ittihad Ibb	(Yemen) Wael Ghazi	Mutual consent	25 May 2026	13th	(Yemen) Ahmed Ali Qasim	29 May 2026
Salam Al-Gharfa	(Yemen) Fouad Al-Awdi	Resigned	28 May 2026	14th	(Yemen) Adel Ahmed Qassem	2 June 2026
Al-Yarmuk	(Yemen) Shafiq Salam	Resigned	13 June 2026	8th	(Yemen) Himyar Al-Masri	13 June 2026
Ahli Sanaa	(Egypt) Ekrami Matbouli	Sacked	4 July 2026	7th	(Yemen) Jamal Al-Qudaimi	4 July 2026
Al Ittihad Ibb	(Yemen) Ahmed Ali Qasim	Resigned	18 July 2026	14th	(Yemen) Ahmed Alawi	

== League table ==
Pos	Team	Pld	W	D	L	GF	GA	GD	Pts	Qualification
1	Al-Shaab Hadramaut	12	9	2	1	18	3	+15	29	AFC Challenge League or Gulf Champions League
2	Al-Tadamun Hadramaut	12	8	2	2	15	5	+10	26	
3	Al Sadd	12	6	4	2	19	9	+10	22	
4	Ahli Sanaa	12	6	4	2	14	5	+9	22	
5	Al-Wehda Sanaa	11	6	3	2	14	8	+6	21	
6	Fahman	12	6	2	4	16	9	+7	20	
7	Al-Yarmuk	12	5	5	2	15	10	+5	20	
8	Al Mukalla	12	6	1	5	14	11	+3	19	
9	Al-Oruba	12	6	1	5	15	16	−1	19	
10	Salam Al-Gharfa	12	3	0	9	9	21	−12	9	
11	Al Ittihad Ibb	12	2	3	7	7	18	−11	9	Relegation to the Second Division
12	Ittihad Hadramout	12	2	1	9	13	22	−9	7	Relegation to the Second Division
13	Hilal Hodeidah	11	2	1	8	8	22	−14	7	Relegation to the Second Division
14	Shabab Al Bayda	12	1	1	10	6	24	−18	4	Relegation to the Second Division

Updated to match(es) played on 28 August 2026. Source: YSscores
Rules for classification: 1) Points; 2) Goal difference; 3) Goals scored.

== Results ==
Home \ Away	AHS	HIH	ITB	MUK	ORU	SAD	SHH	WEH	YAR	FAH	ITH	SAG	SHB	TAH
Ahli Sanaa	—		4–0	1–0			0–0	1–0		2–1				
Hilal Hodeidah		—		1–0	0–1				0–3		2–4	2–0		0–2
Al Ittihad Ibb		0–0	—		1–2		2–1		2–2	1–1				0–2
Al Mukalla			1–0	—	3–0			2–3	2–1	0–1			3–0	
Al-Oruba	2–1				—	0–3		1–2	0–1	2–2	1–0	3–1		
Al Sadd	0–0	5–2	1–0	1–2		—			1–1		3–0	1–0		
Al-Shaab Hadramaut		3–0		3–0	1–0		—			1–0			3–1	1–0
Al-Wehda Sanaa			2–0			0–0	0–0	—	0–0					
Al-Yarmuk							0–1		—	1–0		2–1		1–1
Fahman		3–1				2–0				—	2–0	2–0	2–0	0–1
Ittihad Hadramout	0–0			0–1			0–2	2–4	1–2		—	2–3	3–0	
Salam Al-Gharfa	0–2		2–0				0–2	0–1				—		0–3
Shabab Al Bayda	0–2	1–0	0–1		1–3	2–2		0–2					—	
Al-Tadamun Hadramaut	1–0			0–0		0–2		2–0			2–1		1–0	—

Updated to match(es) played on 28 August 2026. Source: yemen-team.com
Legend: Blue = home team win; Yellow = draw; Red = away team win.
For upcoming matches, an "a" indicates there is an article about the rivalry between the two participants.

== Statistics ==
As of 13 August 2026

=== Top scorers ===
Rank	Player	Club	Goals
1	(Yemen) Haider Aslam	Al-Shaab Hadramaut	7
1	(Yemen) Omar Al-Golan	Al-Tadamun Hadramaut	7
3	(Yemen) Hassan Ba Safar	Al-Mukalla	6
