= 1983–84 Yemeni League =

Statistics of the Yemeni League for the 1983–84 season.

== Results ==
=== North Yemen ===
Pos	Team	Pld	W	D	L	GF	GA	GD	Pts
1	Al-Ahli Sana'a	18	11	4	3	36	15	+21	26
2	Al Sha'ab Sana'a	18	8	8	2	30	15	+15	24
3	Al-Zuhra	18	8	6	4	28	18	+10	22
4	Al-Wahda Sana'a	18	8	5	5	27	17	+10	21
5	Al-Ahli Taizz	18	8	5	5	18	13	+5	21
6	Al-Ahli Hudaida	18	5	5	8	8	19	−11	15
7	Al-Saqr	18	5	4	9	18	36	−18	14
8	Al-Majd	18	4	5	9	13	21	−8	13
9	Al-Sha'ab Ibb	18	5	3	10	15	26	−11	13
10	Al-Taliya	18	3	5	10	10	23	−13	11

=== South Yemen ===
Pos.	Team
1	Al-Shurta Aden
2	Al-Jaish Aden
3	Al-Hassan Aden
