= Khaled Baleid =

Yemeni footballer

Personal information
- Full name: Khaled Hasan Baleid
- Date of birth: 2 November 1986 (age 39)
- Place of birth: Aden, Yemen
- Height: 1.80 m (5 ft 11 in)
- Positions: Left winger; left back

Youth career
- 1998–2001: Al Tilal Aden

Senior career*
Years	Team	Apps	(Gls)
2001–2015	Al Tilal Aden		
2014–2015	Salgaocar	10	(0)

International career^{‡}
2003	Yemen U17	3	(0)
2004	Yemen U20		
2005	Yemen U23		
2003–2013	Yemen	21	(2)
- * Club domestic league appearances and goals as of 19:34, 24 May 2015 (UTC) ‡ National team caps and goals as of 12:19, 15 March 2015(UTC)

Khaled Baleid (Arabic: خالد بلعيد; born 2 November 1986) is a Yemeni retired professional footballer who played primarily as a left winger and last played for Salgaocar SC in the I-League. He represented Yemen national football team in 21 senior international matches between 2003 and 2013.

== Club career ==
=== Al-Tilal SC ===
Baleid began his professional career in the Yemeni Pro League side Al-Tilal SC in 2001. He won the 2005 Yemeni League with the club alongside the Yemeni President Cup in 2007 and 2010. In 2003, he was also in the club's Naseem Cup winning squad.

Baleid appeared in the 2011 AFC Cup and debuted against Dempo SC.

=== Salgaocar FC ===
In 2015, Baleid signed with Indian I-league side Salgaocar FC. According to Derrick Pereira, Baleid was found most suited player in his team.

He debuted for the club on 21 March against Bengaluru FC in a 1–0 defeat. He played 10 matches for the Goa-based side.

== International career ==
Baleid was a regular youth international who represented Yemen in U-17, U-20 and U-23 teams from 2003 to 2005. He was a member of the Yemen national under-17 football team at the 2003 FIFA U-17 World Championship in Finland.

In senior career, Baleid debuted for the Yemeni national team against Oman on 28 December 2003 at the 16th Arabian Gulf Cup. He appeared in 31 international matches for his country and scored 2 goals.

== International statistics ==
Scores and results list Yemen's goal tally first.

No	Date	Venue	Opponent	Score	Result	Competition
1.	30 December 2009	Althawra Sports City Stadium, Sanaa, Yemen	Tajikistan	2–0	2–1	Friendly
2.	13 October 2010	Althawra Sports City Stadium, Sanaa, Yemen	India	1–0	6–3	Friendly

== Honours ==
=== Club ===
Al-Tilal

- Yemeni League

(gold) Champions (1): 2004–05

- Yemeni Presidents Cup

(gold) Champions (2): 2007, 2010
(silver) Runners-up (1): 2009

- Yemeni Naseem Cup (1)

(gold) Champions (1): 2003

- al-Murisi Cup (1)

(gold) Champions (1): 2003

=== Country ===
- Yemen U17 FIFA U-17 World Cup
    - Group Stage: 2003
  - AFC U-17 Championship
    - Runner-up: 2002 AFC U-17 Championship

== See also ==
- List of Yemeni expatriate footballers
