= Akram Al-Worafi =

Yemeni footballer

Personal information
- Full name: Akram Hamood Abdo Al Worafi
- Date of birth: November 12, 1986 (age 39)
- Place of birth: Yemen
- Height: 1.63 m (5 ft 4 in)
- Position: Midfielder

Senior career*
Years	Team	Apps	(Gls)
2003–2009	Al Sha'ab Ibb		
2009–2010	Al-Oruba		
2010–2011	Al-Hilal Al-Sahili		
2011–2017	Al-Saqr		
2017–2018	Al-Bahri		

International career
2004–2017	Yemen	56	(6)
- * Club domestic league appearances and goals

Akram Al-Worafi (born November 12, 1986) is a Yemeni footballer who played as a midfielder.

== Honours ==
=== Club ===
Al-Sha'ab Ibb'

- Yemeni League: 2

2002–03, 2003–04

- Yemeni President Cup: 2

2002, 2003

- Yemeni September 26 Cup: 1

2002

=== Country ===
- Yemen U17
  - FIFA U-17 World Cup
    - Group Stage: 2003
  - AFC U-17 Championship
    - Runner-up: 2002 AFC U-17 Championship
