= 2005 Yemeni League =

Yemeni League
- Season: 2005
- Champions: Al-Tilal
- Matches: 182
- Goals: 480 (2.64 per match)

The 2005 Yemeni League is the 13th edition of top-level football in Yemen.

== Final table ==
Pos	Team	Pld	W	D	L	GF	GA	GD	Pts	Qualification or relegation
1	Al-Tilal	26	16	6	4	47	25	+22	54	
2	Al-Saqr	26	13	8	5	41	23	+18	47	
3	Al-Ahli San'a'	26	12	9	5	42	25	+17	45	
4	Al Sha'ab Ibb	26	12	8	6	40	25	+15	44	
5	Al-Hilal Al-Sahili	26	10	9	7	44	33	+11	39	
6	Al-Sha'ab Hadramaut	26	10	6	10	40	33	+7	36	
7	Shabab al-Jeel Hudayda	26	9	6	11	34	41	−7	33	
8	Al-Shula	26	7	11	8	32	33	−1	32	
9	May 22 Sanaa	26	9	5	12	35	44	−9	32	
10	Al-Wahda San'a'	26	8	7	11	37	44	−7	31	
11	Al Yarmuk Al Rawda	26	9	4	13	31	40	−9	31	
12	Al-Ittihad Ibb	26	7	7	12	24	44	−20	28	Relegated
13	Shabab Al Baydaa	26	7	5	14	26	41	−15	26	Relegated
14	Al Sha'ab Sana'a	26	3	9	14	17	39	−22	18	Relegated

Source: rsssf.com
Rules for classification: 1) points; 2) goal difference; 3) number of goals scored.
