= 1998–99 Yemeni League =

Yemeni League
- Season: 1998–99

The 1998–99 Yemeni League was the 8th instance of the Yemeni League, played between November 1998 to July 1999.

== Results ==
Pos	Team	Pld	W	D	L	GF	GA	GD	Pts
1	Al-Ahli Sana	21	18	2	1	45	7	+38	56
2	Al-Sha'ab Ibb	19	12	1	6	31	22	+9	37
3	Al-Wahda Sana	18	11	3	4	28	16	+12	36
4	Al-Wahda Aden	19	10	5	4	26	18	+8	35
5	Al-Shoala Aden	20	10	3	7	36	23	+13	33
6	Al-Sha'ab Hadramaut	22	9	4	9	18	28	−10	31
7	Hassan Abyan	20	9	3	8	21	16	+5	30
8	Al-Tilal Aden	19	8	5	6	36	25	+11	29
9	Al-Ittihad Ibb	21	7	3	11	28	33	−5	24
10	Al-Zohra Sana'a	19	6	5	8	16	24	−8	23
11	Al-Saqr Taizz	20	4	8	8	23	25	−2	20
12	Al-Tali'aa Taizz	20	5	3	12	22	34	−12	18
13	Al-Hilal Hudayda	19	3	3	13	18	36	−18	12
14	Al-Majd Sana	19	1	2	16	13	54	−41	5

Source: rsssf.com
