= Amin Al-Sanini =

Yemeni footballer

Amine Al-Sanini
Personal information
- Full name: Amine Al-Sanini
- Date of birth: 1 January 1965 (age 61)
- Place of birth: Yemen ، San'a
- Height: 1.85 m (6 ft 1 in)
- Position: Goalkeeper

Senior career*
Years	Team	Apps	(Gls)
1980–1998	Al-Ahli San'a'		

International career
1985–1992	Yemen		

Managerial career
- 2002–2003: Yemen U17
- 2003–2004: Yemen U20
- 2004: Yemen U23
- Al-Wahda San'a'
- Al-Tilal
- Al-Ahli San'a'
- Assistant coach Yemen
- 2010–2012: Yemen
- 2012: Yemen U17
- 2022: Yemen
- * Club domestic league appearances and goals

Amine Al-Sanini (Arabic: امين السنيني, born 1 January 1965 ) is a Yemeni former football goalkeeper who played for Al-Ahli San'a' and the Yemen national team.

== Honours ==
=== Player ===
Al-Ahli San'a

- Yemeni League: 1981, 1983, 1984, 1988, 1992, 1994,

=== Manager ===
Yemen U17

- FIFA U-17 World Cup Group Stage: 2003
- AFC U-17 Championship runner-up: 2002
