= Sharaf Mahfood =

Yemeni footballer

Personal information
- Full name: Sharaf Mahfood
- Date of birth: 20 July 1966 (age 60)
- Place of birth: Yemen
- Height: 1.71 m (5 ft 7 1/2 in)
- Position: Striker

Senior career*
Years	Team	Apps	(Gls)
1986–1997	Al-Tilal		(133)
1997–1998	Tadamon Sour		
1998–2005	Al-Tilal		

International career
1988	South Yemen		
1989–2000	Yemen	40	(6)
- * Club domestic league appearances and goals

Sharaf Mahfood (Arabic: شرف محفوظ) (born 20 July 1966) is a Yemeni football striker for Club Al-Tilal، Yemen's top scorer of the season: 1990–91، He played for Yemen national football team in the qualification series for the 1994 FIFA World Cup.

== Honours ==
=== Club ===
Al-Tilal'

- Yemeni League: 2
  - 1990–91, 2004/05
- Yemeni Presidents Cup: 1
  - 2007
- Yemeni Naseem Cup: 2
  - 2000, 2003
- Yemeni Unity Cup: 1
  - 1999
- Yemeni Ali Muhsin al-Murisi Cup: 1
  - 2003
