= Fathi Jabir =

Yemeni footballer

Personal information
- Full name: Fathi Ahmed Jabir
- Date of birth: 29 December 1980 (age 45)
- Place of birth: Yemen
- Height: 1.74 m (5 ft 8 1/2 in)
- Position: Striker

Senior career*
Years	Team	Apps	(Gls)
1998–2010	Al-Tilal		

International career
2004–2005	Yemen	2	(1)
- * Club domestic league appearances and goals

Fathi Jabir (Arabic: فتحي جابر ) (born 29 December 1980) is a Yemeni football striker and Club Al-Tilal، Yemen's top scorer the season: 1998/99

== Honours ==
=== Club ===
Al-Tilal'

- Yemeni League: 1
  - 2005
- Yemeni Presidents Cup: 1
  - 2007
- Yemeni Naseem Cup: 2
  - 2000, 2003
- Yemeni Unity Cup: 1
  - 1999
- Yemeni Ali Muhsin al-Murisi Cup: 1
  - 2003
