= 2003–04 Yemeni League =

Yemeni League
- Season: 2003–04
- Champions: Shaab Ibb
- Matches: 132
- Goals: 335 (2.54 per match)

Statistics of the Yemeni League for the 2003–04 season.

== Final table ==
Pos	Team	Pld	W	D	L	GF	GA	GD	Pts	Relegation
1	Al-Sha'ab (Ibb)	22	13	7	2	29	13	+16	46	
2	Al-Ahli (Sanaa)	22	14	2	6	47	25	+22	44	
3	Al-Tilal (Aden)	22	12	3	7	32	24	+8	39	
4	Al-Wahda (Sanaa)	22	11	4	7	32	25	+7	37	
5	Al-Hilal (Al Hudaydah)	22	10	6	6	29	23	+6	36	
6	May 22 (Sanaa)	22	9	3	10	36	32	+4	30	
7	Shabab (al-Baydaa)	22	7	7	8	29	31	−2	28	
8	Al-Saqr (Taiz)	22	5	9	8	28	26	+2	24	
9	Al-Sha'ab Hadramaut (Mukalla)	22	6	6	10	18	26	−8	24	
10	Yarmuk al-Rawda (Sanaa)	22	6	4	12	23	32	−9	22	
11	Hassan (Abyan)	22	5	4	13	22	32	−10	19	Relegated
12	Al-Ahli (Hudayda)	22	4	5	13	10	46	−36	17	Relegated

Source: rsssf.com
