= Fekri Al-Hubaishi =

Yemeni footballer

Personal information
- Full name: Fekri Yahia Al-Hubaishi
- Date of birth: April 18, 1978 (age 48)
- Place of birth: Yemen
- Height: 1.73 m (5 ft 8 in)
- Position: Striker

Senior career*
Years	Team	Apps	(Gls)
2001–2008	Al Sha'ab Ibb		(26)
2009	Al-Saqr		
2009–2012	Al Sha'ab Ibb		
2014–2015	Ittihad Ibb		

International career^{‡}
2003–2007	Yemen	16	(7)
- * Club domestic league appearances and goals ‡ National team caps and goals as of 29 August 2025

Fekri Al-Hubaishi (born April 18, 1978, in Yemen) is a Yemeni football striker. He is a member of the Yemen national football team.

== Career ==
Fekri Al-Hubaishi started his career in Al Sha'ab Ibb, where he played 7 for seasons. After a short spell in Al-Saqr, he returned to his parent club Al Sha'ab Ibb. He achieved the title of league top scorer in 2009.

== Career statistics ==
=== International ===
Appearances and goals by national team and year
National team	Year	Apps	Goals
Yemen	2000	1	0
Yemen	2003	2	1
Yemen	2006	6	3
Yemen	2007	8	2
Total		17	6

Scores and results list Iraq's goal tally first, score column indicates score after each Kasim goal.

List of international goals scored by Yaser Kasim
No.	Date	Venue	Opponent	Score	Result	Competition	Ref.
1	10 October 2003	Prince Abdullah Al-Faisal Sports City, Jeddah, Saudi Arabia	Bhutan	3–0	8–0	2004 AFC Asian Cup qualification	
2	1 March 2006	Ambedkar Stadium, New Delhi, India	India	2–0	3–0	2007 AFC Asian Cup qualification	
3	29 August 2006	Althawra Sports City Stadium, Sanaa, Yemen	Libya	–	1–1	Friendly	
4	20 December 2006	Althawra Sports City Stadium, Sanaa, Yemen	Djibouti	2–1	4–1	Friendly	
5	7 January 2007	Althawra Sports City Stadium, Sanaa, Yemen	Eritrea	2–1	4–1	Friendly	
6	8 October 2007	Althawra Sports City Stadium, Sanaa, Yemen	Maldives	2–0	3–0	2010 FIFA World Cup qualification	

== Honours ==
=== Club ===
Al-Sha'ab Ibb'

- Yemeni League: 2

2002–03, 2003–04

- Yemeni President Cup: 2

2002, 2003

- Yemeni September 26 Cup: 1

2002

Al-Saqr'

- Yemeni Unity Cup: 1

2008
