= Basim Qasim =

Iraqi footballer & manager (born 1963)

Personal information
- Full name: Basim Qasim Hamdan Al-Suwaid
- Date of birth: 22 March 1963 (age 63)
- Place of birth: Baghdad, Iraq
- Height: 1.73 m (5 ft 8 in)
- Positions: Defender; midfielder

Team information
- Current team: Al-Zawraa (manager)

Senior career*
Years	Team	Apps	(Gls)
1979–1982	Al-Amana		
1982–1984	Al-Quwa Al-Jawiya		
1984–1990	Al-Shorta		
1990–1991	Al-Amana		

International career
1985–1988	Iraq	18	(0)

Managerial career
- 1991–1992: Al-Shorta Reserves
- 1992–1994: Al-Shorta (Assist.)
- 1994: Al-Shorta
- 1994–1996: Al-Shorta (Assist.)
- 1996: Al-Shorta
- 1996: Iraq U20 (Assist.)
- 1996–1997: Al-Kut
- 1997: Al-Karkh
- 1997: Al-Shorta (Assist.)
- 1997–1998: Salahaddin
- 1998–1999: Diyala
- 1999–2001: Duhok
- 1999–2000: Iraq (Assist.)
- 2000: Iraq U17
- 2001: Iraq (Assist.)
- 2001–2002: Al-Karkh
- 2002: Al-Shorta
- 2003: Al-Jaish
- 2003: Al-Shorta
- 2003–2004: Al-Wahda
- 2004–2005: Al-Zawraa
- 2006: Al Urooba
- 2007: Al-Ahli
- 2007–2011: Duhok
- 2011: Zakho
- 2011–2012: Al-Shorta
- 2012–2013: Sulaymaniya
- 2013–2014: Al-Naft
- 2014: Duhok
- 2015–2016: Al-Zawraa
- 2016–2017: Al-Quwa Al-Jawiya
- 2017: → Iraq (loan)
- 2017–2018: Iraq
- 2018–2019: Al-Quwa Al-Jawiya
- 2019: Al-Naft
- 2019–2020: Al-Zawraa
- 2021–2022: Al-Naft
- 2022–2023: Al-Minaa
- 2023–2024: Al-Naft
- 2024–2025: Al-Talaba
- 2025–2026: Erbil
- 2026–: Al-Zawraa
- * Club domestic league appearances and goals

Basim Qasim Hamdan Al-Suwaid (Arabic: باسم قاسم حمدان السويد; born 22 March 1963) is an Iraqi football manager and former player who is currently the manager of Al-Zawraa.

He was a defender in his playing days, also capable of playing in midfield, and he played for Iraq in the 1986 FIFA World Cup. He spent most of his playing career at Iraqi club Al-Shorta.

He has won multiple major honours as a coach, including three Iraqi Premier League titles, one Baghdad Championship title, one Yemeni League title and two AFC Cup titles.

== Managerial statistics ==
As of 1 November 2022

Team	Nat	From	To	Record				
Team	Nat	From	To	G	W	D	L	Win %
Diyala FC	(Iraq)	1998	1999	30	10	12	8	33.33
Al-Wehda	(Yemen)	31 October 2003	15 May 2004	22	11	4	7	50.00
Al-Zawraa	(Iraq)	21 October 2004	17 May 2005	26	17	6	3	65.38
Al Urooba	(United Arab Emirates)	22 July 2006	14 October 2006	5	0	0	5	0.00
Al-Ahli	(Yemen)	January 2007	12 August 2007	34	16	14	4	47.06
Duhok SC	(Iraq)	5 September 2007	6 February 2011	106	64	25	17	60.38
Zakho FC	(Iraq)	20 March 2011	2 August 2011	12	8	2	2	66.67
Al-Shorta	(Iraq)	25 October 2011	26 August 2012	34	15	11	8	44.12
Sulaymaniyah	(Iraq)	2 December 2012	24 September 2013	30	11	6	13	36.67
Al-Naft	(Iraq)	6 September 2013	5 June 2014	22	7	6	9	31.82
Duhok SC	(Iraq)	20 August 2014	5 December 2014	5	4	0	1	80.00
Al-Zawraa	(Iraq)	21 July 2015	9 June 2016	31	20	9	2	64.52
Al-Jawiya	(Iraq)	5 July 2016	15 August 2017	51	32	18	1	62.75
Iraq	(Iraq)	22 May 2017	4 August 2018	17	8	8	1	47.06
Al-Jawiya	(Iraq)	10 August 2018	3 March 2019	33	19	8	6	57.58
Al-Naft	(Iraq)	13 March 2019	24 July 2019	20	10	6	4	50.0
Al-Zawraa	(Iraq)	20 September 2019	30 December 2020	47	23	17	7	48.94
Al-Naft	(Iraq)	26 March 2021	4 July 2022	58	22	25	11	37.9
Al-Minaa SC	(Iraq)	13 August 2022	Present	1	1	0	0	100.00
Total				584	298	177	109	51.03

== Honours ==
=== Player ===
Al-Amana

- Iraqi First Division League: 1990–91

Iraq

- Arab Cup: 1985
- Arab Games: 1985

=== Manager ===
Al-Shorta

- Baghdad Championship: 2002–03

Al-Ahli Sana'a

- Yemeni League: 2007

Duhok

- Iraqi Premier League: 2009–10

Al-Zawraa

- Iraqi Premier League: 2015–16

Al-Quwa Al-Jawiya

- Iraqi Premier League: 2016–17
- AFC Cup: 2016, 2018
