= Akram Al-Selwi =

Yemeni footballer

Personal information
- Full name: Akram Al-Selwi
- Date of birth: 8 September 1986 (age 40)
- Place of birth: Yemen
- Height: 1.72 m (5 ft 7 1/2 in)
- Positions: Forward; left wing; centre midfielder

Team information
- Current team: Al-Hilal Al-Sahili
- Number: 10

Youth career
- 1998–2001: Al Yarmuk Yemeni

Senior career*
Years	Team	Apps	(Gls)
2001–2004	Al Yarmuk Yemeni		
2004–2005	Al-Hilal Sudanese		
2005–2008	Al Yarmuk Yemeni		
2008–	Al-Hilal Al-Sahili		

International career
2003	Yemen U17	3	
2004	Yemen U20		
2004–2013	Yemen		
- * Club domestic league appearances and goals as of 00:00, 10 October 2011 (UTC)

Akram Al-Selwi (Arabic: اكرم الصلوي; born 8 September 1986) is a Yemeni football forward who plays for Al-Hilal Al-Sahili. He is also a member of the Yemen national football team. Al-Selwi played for Yemen at the 2003 FIFA U-17 World Championship in Finland.

== Career ==
Akram plays for Al-Hilal Al-Sahili from Al Hudaydah, Yemen. He is left footed and he can play on left midfield and central midfield position, as well as an attacker.

== Honours ==
Al-Hilal Al-Sahili

- Yemeni League: 2008–09
