= 2010 Yemeni Unity Cup =

2010 saw the seventh edition of the Yemeni Unity Cup. The competition started in February and concluded in May.

== Round 3 ==
Team 1	Score	Team 2
13 March 2010
Shaab Ibb	3 - 0	22 May
14 March 2010
Al Yarmok	4 - 1	Salam Al Qarfa
20 March 2010
Shabab Al Baydaa	3 - 0	Al Wehda Sanaa
Al-Saqr	3 - 1	Tdamn Hadramawt
22 March 2010
Al Wehda Aden	1 - 3	Tadamon Shapwah
28 March 2010
Shabab alzaydiah	1 - 2	Al-Shula
Shab Hadramawt	0 - 2	ALRshed
17 April 2010
Naser AL-Talla	0 - 2	Al Hilal Al Sahel

== Quarter-finals ==
Team 1	Score	Team 2
27 April 2010
Al Shula	1 - 2	Al Saqr
Tadamon Shapwah	3 - 0	Al Yarmouk
Al Hilal Al Sahel	4 - 3	Shabab Ibb
9 May 2010
Shabab Al Baydaa	1 - 0	Al Rashd
