= Yemen national football team records and statistics =

This is a list of Yemen national football team's all kinds of competitive records.

== Individual records ==
As of match played 30 September 2026

=== Player records ===
Players in bold are still active with Yemen.

Most appearances
Rank	Player	Caps	Goals	Career
1	Alaa Al-Sasi	84	9	2006–2019
2	Salem Saeed	82	0	2002–2019
3	**Abdulwasea Al-Matari**	79	15	2013–present
4	Akram Al-Worafi	71	6	2004–2017
5	Mudir Al-Radaei	67	1	2012–2023
6	Ali Al-Nono	66	30	2000–2010
7	Mohammed Boqshan	55	1	2012–2021
7	Mohammed Fuad Omar	55	1	2012–2019
9	**Ahmed Al-Sarori**	51	2	2015–present
10	Mohammed Ayash	44	0	2007–2021

Top goalscorers
Rank	Player	Goals	Caps	Ratio	Career
1	Ali Al-Nono	30	66	0.45	2000–2010
2	**Nasser Al-Gahwashi**	16	37	0.43	2019–present
3	Adel Al-Salimi	15	25	0.6	2000–2004
3	**Abdulwasea Al-Matari**	15	79	0.19	2013–present
5	Alaa Al-Sasi	9	85	0.11	2006–2019
6	Nashwan Al-Haggam	7	16	0.44	2002–2007
6	Yaser Ba Suhai	7	42	0.17	2003–2015
8	Fekri Al-Hubaishi	6	17	0.35	2000–2007
8	**Omar Al-Dahi**	6	40	0.15	2019–present
8	Ali Awad Al-Omqi	6	42	0.14	2001–2009
8	Akram Al-Worafi	6	71	0.08	2004–2017

== Competition records ==
=== FIFA World Cup ===
FIFA World Cup record									Qualification record					
Year	Result	Position	Pld	W	D*	L	GF	GA	Pld	W	D	L	GF	GA
as North Yemen
(Mexico) 1986	Did not qualify								4	0	0	4	1	12
(Italy) 1990	Did not qualify								4	0	0	4	0	5
as Yemen
(United States) 1994	Did not qualify								8	3	2	3	12	13
(France) 1998	Did not qualify								6	2	2	2	10	7
(South Korea) (Japan) 2002	Did not qualify								6	3	2	1	14	8
(Germany) 2006	Did not qualify								6	1	2	3	6	11
(South Africa) 2010	Did not qualify								4	1	1	2	4	4
(Brazil) 2014	Did not qualify								2	0	1	1	0	2
(Russia) 2018	Did not qualify								10	2	1	7	5	18
(Qatar) 2022	Did not qualify								8	1	2	5	6	18
(Canada) (Mexico) (United States) 2026	Did not qualify								8	2	3	3	9	10
(Morocco) (Portugal) (Spain) 2030	To be determined								To be determined					
(Saudi Arabia) 2034	To be determined								To be determined					
Total	–	0/11	–	–	–	–	–	–	66	15	16	35	67	108

=== AFC Asian Cup ===
AFC Asian Cup record									Qualification record					
Year	Result	Position	Pld	W	D	L	GF	GA	Pld	W	D*	L	GF	GA
as North Yemen
(Singapore) 1984	Did not qualify								4	0	0	4	2	18
(Qatar) 1988	Did not qualify								5	1	3	1	5	5
as Yemen
(Japan) 1992	Did not enter								Did not enter					
(United Arab Emirates) 1996	Did not qualify								4	1	0	3	2	8
(Lebanon) 2000	Did not qualify								4	2	0	2	14	5
(China) 2004	Did not qualify								6	2	1	3	15	15
(Indonesia) (Malaysia) (Thailand) (Vietnam) 2007	Did not qualify								6	2	0	4	5	13
(Qatar) 2011	Did not qualify								6	2	1	3	7	9
(Australia) 2015	Did not qualify								6	0	0	6	3	18
(United Arab Emirates) 2019	Group stage	23rd	3	0	0	3	0	10	18	6	5	7	16	23
(Qatar) 2023	Did not qualify								11	1	3	7	6	25
(Saudi Arabia) 2027	Qualified								14	6	5	3	29	11
Total	Best: Group stage	2/12	3	0	0	3	0	10	84	23	18	43	104	150

=== Asian Games ===
Football at the Asian Games has been an under-23 tournament since 2002.

Asian Games record
Year	Result	Pld	W	D	L	GF	GA
as North Yemen
(India) 1951	Did not participate						
(Philippines) 1954	Did not participate						
(Japan) 1958	Did not participate						
(Indonesia) 1962	Did not participate						
(Thailand) 1966	Did not participate						
(Thailand) 1970	Did not participate						
(Iran) 1974	Did not participate						
(Thailand) 1978	Did not participate						
(India) 1982	Withdrew						
(South Korea) 1986	Did not participate						
as Yemen
(China) 1990	Group stage	3	0	2	1	0	2
(Japan) 1994	Group stage	4	0	0	4	0	14
(Thailand) 1998	Did not participate						
2002–present	See Yemen national under-23 football team						
Total	2/13	7	0	2	5	0	16

=== Arabian Gulf Cup ===
Arabian Gulf Cup record
Year	Result	Pld	W	D*	L	GF	GA
(Kuwait) 2003–04	Seventh place	6	0	1	5	2	18
(Qatar) 2004	Group stage	3	0	1	2	1	6
(United Arab Emirates) 2007	Group stage	3	0	1	2	3	5
(Oman) 2009	Group stage	3	0	0	3	2	11
(Yemen) 2010	Group stage	3	0	0	3	1	9
(Bahrain) 2013	Group stage	3	0	0	3	0	6
(Saudi Arabia) 2014	Group stage	3	0	2	1	0	1
(Kuwait) 2017–18	Group stage	3	0	0	3	0	8
(Qatar) 2019	Group stage	3	0	1	2	0	9
(Iraq) 2023	Group stage	3	0	0	3	2	10
(Kuwait) 2024–25	Group stage	3	1	0	2	4	5
(Saudi Arabia) 2026	Group stage	3	1	0	2	5	7
Total	Best: Group stage	39	2	6	31	20	95

=== Arab Cup ===
FIFA Arab Cup record
Year	Result	Pld	W	D*	L	GF	GA
as North Yemen
(Lebanon) 1963	Did not enter						
(Kuwait) 1964	Did not enter						
(Iraq) 1966	Group stage	3	0	0	3	0	27
(Saudi Arabia) 1985	Did not enter						
(Jordan) 1988	Did not enter						
as Yemen
(Syria) 1992	Did not enter						
(Qatar) 1998	Withdrew						
(Kuwait) 2002	Group stage	4	0	1	3	5	13
(Saudi Arabia) 2012	Group stage	3	1	0	2	3	7
(Qatar) 2021	Did not qualify						
(Qatar) 2025	Did not qualify						
Total	Best: Group stage	10	1	1	8	8	47

=== Pan Arab Games ===
Pan Arab Games record
Year	Round	Pld	W	D	L	GF	GA
as North Yemen
(Egypt) 1953	Did not enter						
(Lebanon) 1957	Did not enter						
(Morocco) 1961	Did not enter						
(United Arab Republic) 1965	Did not enter						
(Syria) 1976	Did not enter						
(Morocco) 1985	Group stage	3	1	0	2	3	6
as Yemen
(Lebanon) 1997	Did not enter						
(Jordan) 1999	Did not enter						
(Egypt) 2007	Did not enter						
(Qatar) 2011	Did not enter						
(Algeria) 2023	Did not enter						
Total	1/11	3	1	0	2	3	6

=== WAFF Championship ===
WAFF Championship record
Year	Result	Pld	W	D*	L	GF	GA
(Jordan) 2000	Did not enter						
(Syria) 2002	Did not enter						
(Iran) 2004	Did not enter						
(Jordan) 2007	Did not enter						
(Iran) 2008	Did not enter						
(Jordan) 2010	Semi-finals	3	1	1	1	5	4
(Kuwait) 2012	Group stage	3	0	0	3	1	4
(Qatar) 2014	Withdrew						
(Iraq) 2019	Group stage	4	1	1	2	4	5
(Oman) 2026	Qualified						
Total	4/10	10	2	2	6	10	13

== Head-to-head record ==
The list shown below shows the Yemen national football team all-time international record against opposing nations.

As of 30 September 2026

Team	Pld	W	D	L	GF	GA	GD	Best win	Worst loss
Bahrain	19	4	3	12	16	37	−21	5–2	1–5, 0–4
Bangladesh	2	0	1	1	0	1	−1	X	0–1
Bhutan	5	4	1	0	30	3	+27	11–2	X
Brunei	4	4	0	0	17	0	+17	9–0	X
Cambodia	2	2	0	0	8	0	+8	7–0	X
Chad	1	0	1	0	0	0	0	X	X
China	4	1	1	2	1	5	−4	1–0	0–4
Comoros	2	1	1	0	6	4	+2	2–0	X
Djibouti	1	1	0	0	4	1	+3	4–1	X
Egypt	1	0	0	1	0	1	–1	X	0–1
Eritrea	1	1	0	0	4	1	+3	4–1	X
Ethiopia	2	0	1	1	1	2	−1	X	0–1
Finland	1	0	1	0	0	0	0	X	X
Hong Kong	3	1	1	1	1	2	−1	1–0	0–2
India	9	6	2	1	20	12	+8	6–3	0–4
Indonesia	6	0	4	2	3	7	−4	X	0–3
Iran	3	0	0	3	1	11	−10	X	0–5
Iraq	16	0	3	13	7	39	−32	X	0–5,1–6
Japan	4	0	0	4	3	8	−5	X	0–2
Kenya	1	1	0	0	3	1	+2	3–1	X
Kuwait	13	1	5	7	7	27	−20	2–1	0–5
Kyrgyzstan	2	1	0	1	2	3	−1	1–0	1–3
Lebanon	5	2	1	2	7	7	0	2–0	2–4
Malawi	1	1	0	0	1	0	+1	1–0	X
Malaysia	5	1	0	4	4	9	−5	1–0	1–4
Maldives	4	3	0	1	7	2	+5	3–0	0–2
Mauritania	1	0	0	1	0	2	−2	X	0–2
Mexico	1	0	0	1	0	2	−2	X	0–2
Mongolia	1	0	0	1	0	2	−2	X	0–2
Morocco	1	0	0	1	0	4	−4	X	0–4
Nepal	6	4	2	0	11	3	+8	3–0	X
Nigeria	1	0	0	1	0	2	−2	X	0–2
North Korea	5	0	2	3	3	8	−5	X	0–3
Oman	11	0	2	9	5	21	−16	X	0–4
Qatar	10	0	1	9	2	31	−29	X	0–6
Pakistan	6	3	2	1	12	6	+6	5–1	1–4
Palestine	7	2	0	5	5	13	−8	3–1	0–5
Philippines	5	1	3	1	4	5	−1	1–0	0–2
Saudi Arabia	21	0	2	19	7	58	−51	X	0–7
Senegal	1	1	0	1	4	2	+2	4–1	0–1
Singapore	2	0	1	1	3	4	-1	X	1-2
South Korea	1	0	0	1	0	6	−6	X	0–6
Sri Lanka	2	1	1	0	4	1	+3	3–0	X
Syria	10	2	1	7	8	24	−16	2–1	2–8
Tajikistan	4	2	1	1	4	3	+1	2–1	0–1
Tanzania	3	2	1	0	5	3	+2	2–1	X
Thailand	6	0	4	2	5	9	−4	X	0–3
Turkmenistan	1	0	0	1	0	4	−4	X	0–4
Uganda	1	0	1	0	2	2	0	X	X
United Arab Emirates	14	3	0	11	13	33	−20	3–1	0–4
Uzbekistan	6	0	0	6	2	16	−14	X	0–5
Vietnam	2	0	0	2	0	11	−11	X	0–9
Zambia	2	0	1	1	2	3	−1	X	0–1

^{^} Include North Vietnam
