= Alex Junior Nweze =

Nigerian footballer

Personal information
- Full name: Alex Junior Nweze
- Date of birth: 27 August 1991 (age 35)
- Place of birth: Abuja, Nigeria
- Height: 1.71 m (5 ft 7 in)
- Position: Defender

Team information
- Current team: Al-Bahri
- Number: 4

Youth career
- Kwara Football Academy

Senior career*
Years	Team	Apps	(Gls)
2010–2012	Enyimba		
2012–2015	Al Yarmuk Al Rawda		
2015–2017	Al-Mudhaibi		
2018–	Al-Bahri		
- * Club domestic league appearances and goals as of September 11, 2018

Alex Junior Nweze (born August 27, 1991) is a Nigerian footballer who plays as a defender for Al-Bahri in the Iraqi Premier League.

== Honours ==
=== Al-Yarmuk ===
- Yemeni League: 2013.

=== Al-Mudhaibi ===
- Oman First Division League: 2016–17
