= 2026–27 GFF Gulf Club Champions League =

دوري أبطال الخليج للأندية 2026–27

Tournament details
- Dates: 13 October 2026 – 30 April 2027
- Teams: 12 (from 1 confederation) (from 8 associations)

Tournament statistics
- Matches played: 18
- Goals scored: 67 (3.72 per match)
- Top scorer: (Brazil) Miullen (6 goals)
- All statistics correct as of 4 November 2026.

The 2026–27 GFF Gulf Club Champions League is the 33rd edition of the GFF Gulf Club Champions League, a football competition for clubs from the eight member nations of the Gulf Football Federation (GFF), and the first under a new 12-team format.

Al-Rayyan were the reigning champions, but they will be unable to defend their title as they have instead qualified for the AFC Champions League Two.

== Association team allocation ==
The team entries allocation was based on the AFC club competitions ranking for the 2026–27 season.

Participation for 2026–27 GFF Gulf Club Champions League
Participating
Not participating

Ranking		Association	Group stage slots
GFF	AFC	Association	Group stage slots
1	1	Saudi Arabia	2
2	4	United Arab Emirates	2
3	5	Qatar	2
4	12	Iraq	2
5	16	Bahrain	1
6	17	Oman	1
7	21	Kuwait	1
8	43	Yemen	1

== Teams ==
Team	Qualification method	App. (last)
(Saudi Arabia) Al-Ettifaq	2025–26 Saudi Pro League seventh place	8th (2024–25)
(Saudi Arabia) Neom	2025–26 Saudi Pro League eighth place	1st
(United Arab Emirates) Al-Nasr	2025–26 UAE Pro League sixth place	6th (2024–25)
(United Arab Emirates) Ajman	2025–26 UAE Pro League seventh place	1st
(Qatar) Al-Duhail	2025–26 Qatar Stars League fifth place	1st
Qatar SC	2025–26 Qatar Stars League sixth place	5th (2009)
(Iraq) Erbil	2025–26 Iraq Stars League third place	1st
(Iraq) Al-Zawraa	2025–26 Iraq Stars League fourth place	1st
(Bahrain) Al-Riffa	2025–26 Bahraini Premier League third place	13th (2024–25)
(Oman) Al-Shabab	2025–26 Oman Professional League runners-up	2nd (2013)
(Kuwait) Kazma	2025–26 Kuwaiti Premier League fourth place	8th (2015)
(Yemen) Al-Shaab Hadramaut	2025–26 Yemeni League leaders	1st

Notes

1. Yemen (YEM): The 2025–26 Yemeni League was still ongoing at the time of the draw. The league leaders at the time, Al-Shaab Hadramaut, were selected to participate.

=== Draw ===
The draw was held on 24 August 2026. The 12 teams were drawn into three groups of four, by selecting one team from each of the four ranked pots.

Pot 1	Pot 2	Pot 3	Pot 4
(Saudi Arabia) Al-Ettifaq (Saudi Arabia) Neom (United Arab Emirates) Al-Nasr	(United Arab Emirates) Ajman; Al-Duhail; Qatar SC	(Iraq) Erbil (Iraq) Al-Zawraa (Oman) Al-Shabab	(Bahrain) Al-Riffa (Kuwait) Kazma (Yemen) Al-Shaab Hadramaut

== Group stage ==
Tiebreakers
Teams are ranked according to points (3 points for a win, 1 point for a draw, 0 points for a loss), and if tied on points, the following tiebreaking criteria will be applied, in the order given, to determine the rankings:
1. Points in head-to-head matches among tied teams;
2. Goal difference in head-to-head matches among tied teams;
3. Goals scored in head-to-head matches among tied teams;
4. If more than two teams are tied, and after applying all head-to-head criteria above, a subset of teams are still tied, all head-to-head criteria above will be reapplied exclusively to this subset of teams;
5. Goal difference in all group matches;
6. Goals scored in all group matches;
7. Disciplinary points (yellow card = 1 point, red card as a result of two yellow cards = 3 points, direct red card = 3 points, yellow card followed by direct red card = 4 points);
8. Drawing of lots.

=== Group A ===
Pos	Team	Pld	W	D	L	GF	GA	GD	Pts	Qualification	NEO	SHB	DUH	SHD
1	(Saudi Arabia) Neom	3	2	0	1	8	3	+5	6	Advance to knockout stage	—	16 Feb.	3–0	4–0
2	(Oman) Al-Shabab	3	2	0	1	7	4	+3	6	Advance to knockout stage	3–1	—	8 Dec.	4–0
3	(Qatar) Al-Duhail	3	2	0	1	5	4	+1	6	Possible knockout stage based on ranking	24 Nov.	3–0	—	16 Feb.
4	(Yemen) Al-Shaab Hadramaut	3	0	0	3	1	10	−9	0		9 Dec.	25 Nov.	1–2	—

Updated to match(es) played on 3 November 2026. Source: GSA
Rules for classification: Group stage tiebreakers
13 October 2026
21:00 UTC+3

Neom (Saudi Arabia)	4–0	(Yemen) Al-Shaab Hadramaut
Lacazette 12', 45+1'; Benrahma 16'; Al-Dossari 23'	Report

King Khalid Sports City Stadium, Tabuk
Referee: Ahmed Khalil (Bahrain)
14 October 2026
17:45 UTC+3

Al-Duhail (Qatar)	3–0	(Oman) Al-Shabab
Ali 7', 51'; Yansané 77'	Report

Abdullah bin Khalifa Stadium, Doha
Referee: Khalid Al-Turais (Saudi Arabia)

27 October 2026
18:45 UTC+4

Al-Shabab (Oman)	3–1	(Saudi Arabia) Neom
Doesburg 42', 60'; Al-Muqbali 55'	Report	Masouras 15'

Al-Rustaq Sports Complex, Rustaq
Referee: Saud Al-Samhan (Kuwait)
28 October 2026
19:15 UTC+4

Al-Shaab Hadramaut (Yemen)	1–2	(Qatar) Al-Duhail
Bin Dahman 83'	Report	Mohamed 73'; Al-Rawi 90+5'

Thani bin Jassim Stadium, Doha (Qatar)
Referee: Mohanad Qasim Sarray (Iraq)

3 November 2026
18:45 UTC+4

Al-Shabab (Oman)	4–0	(Yemen) Al-Shaab Hadramaut
Musulin 27'; Al-Habsi 39'; Al-Shahri 46'; Al-Mamari 49'	Report

Al-Seeb Stadium, Seeb
Referee: Ahmed Kadhim Gatea (Iraq)
3 November 2026
21:00 UTC+3

Neom (Saudi Arabia)	3–0	(Qatar) Al-Duhail
Benrahma 4', 86'; Al-Oyayari 39'	Report

King Khalid Sports City Stadium, Tabuk
Referee: Mohamed Saad (Bahrain)

24 November 2026
20:00 UTC+3

Al-Duhail (Qatar)	v	(Saudi Arabia) Neom
	Report

Abdullah bin Khalifa Stadium, Doha
25 November 2026
19:30 UTC+4

Al-Shaab Hadramaut (Yemen)	v	(Oman) Al-Shabab
	Report

8 December 2026
19:30 UTC+4

Al-Shabab (Oman)	v	(Qatar) Al-Duhail
	Report

9 December 2026
19:30 UTC+4

Al-Shaab Hadramaut (Yemen)	v	(Saudi Arabia) Neom
	Report

16 February 2027
22:30 UTC+3

Neom (Saudi Arabia)	v	(Oman) Al-Shabab
	Report

King Khalid Sports City Stadium, Tabuk
16 February 2027
22:30 UTC+3

Al-Duhail (Qatar)	v	(Yemen) Al-Shaab Hadramaut
	Report

Abdullah bin Khalifa Stadium, Doha

=== Group B ===
Pos	Team	Pld	W	D	L	GF	GA	GD	Pts	Qualification	NSR	RIF	ZAW	QAT
1	(United Arab Emirates) Al-Nasr	3	3	0	0	7	1	+6	9	Advance to knockout stage	—	3–0	16 Feb.	3–1
2	(Bahrain) Al-Riffa	3	1	1	1	5	5	0	4	Advance to knockout stage	9 Dec.	—	24 Nov.	4–1
3	(Iraq) Al-Zawraa	3	0	2	1	2	3	−1	2	Possible knockout stage based on ranking	0–1	1–1	—	9 Dec.
4	Qatar SC	3	0	1	2	3	8	−5	1		25 Nov.	16 Feb.	1–1	—

Updated to match(es) played on 4 November 2026. Source: GSA
Rules for classification: Group stage tiebreakers
13 October 2026
17:45 UTC+3

Qatar SC	1–1	(Iraq) Al-Zawraa
Boli 45+5'	Report	Sherif 21'

Suheim bin Hamad Stadium, Doha
Referee: Ali Abbas (Kuwait)
13 October 2026
20:00 UTC+4

Al-Nasr (United Arab Emirates)	3–0	(Bahrain) Al-Riffa
Miérez 30'; Agudelo 46'; Hrustic 63'	Report

Al Maktoum Stadium, Dubai
Referee: Abdullah Al-Shehri (Saudi Arabia)

27 October 2026
20:00 UTC+3

Al-Riffa (Bahrain)	4–1	Qatar SC
Madan 1'; Saeed 40'; Meziani 47'; Machado 56'	Report	Soria 12'

Bahrain National Stadium, Riffa
Referee: Said Al-Mezeini (Oman)
28 October 2026
21:30 UTC+4

Al-Zawraa (Iraq)	0–1	(United Arab Emirates) Al-Nasr
	Report	Miérez 64'

Al-Zawraa Stadium, Baghdad
Referee: Mahmood Al-Majarafi (Oman)

3 November 2026
18:30 UTC+4

Al-Zawraa (Iraq)	1–1	(Bahrain) Al-Riffa
Qasim 71'	Report	Abduljabbar 73'

Al-Zawraa Stadium, Baghdad
Referee: Ammar Ashkanani (Kuwait)
4 November 2026
19:00 UTC+4

Al-Nasr (United Arab Emirates)	4–1	Qatar SC
Miérez 21'; Ghayedi 44', 76'; Delgado 90+6'	Report	Selemani 45+1'

Al Maktoum Stadium, Dubai
Referee: Yahya Al-Balushi (Oman)

24 November 2026
17:30 UTC+3

Al-Riffa (Bahrain)	v	(Iraq) Al-Zawraa
	Report

Bahrain National Stadium, Riffa
25 November 2026
20:00 UTC+3

Qatar SC	v	(United Arab Emirates) Al-Nasr
	Report

Suheim bin Hamad Stadium, Doha

9 December 2026
17:15 UTC+3

Al-Riffa (Bahrain)	v	(United Arab Emirates) Al-Nasr
	Report

Bahrain National Stadium, Riffa
9 December 2026
21:30 UTC+4

Al-Zawraa (Iraq)	v	Qatar SC
	Report

Al-Zawraa Stadium, Baghdad

16 February 2027
22:00 UTC+4

Al-Nasr (United Arab Emirates)	v	(Iraq) Al-Zawraa
	Report

Al Maktoum Stadium, Dubai
16 February 2027
21:00 UTC+3

Qatar SC	v	(Bahrain) Al-Riffa
	Report

Suheim bin Hamad Stadium, Doha

=== Group C ===
Pos	Team	Pld	W	D	L	GF	GA	GD	Pts	Qualification	ERB	ETT	AJM	KAZ
1	(Iraq) Erbil	3	2	0	1	13	5	+8	6	Advance to knockout stage	—	3–0	8 Dec.	6–0
2	(Saudi Arabia) Al-Ettifaq	3	2	0	1	4	3	+1	6	Advance to knockout stage	17 Feb.	—	2–0	2–0
3	(United Arab Emirates) Ajman	3	2	0	1	7	7	0	6	Possible knockout stage based on ranking	5–4	24 Nov.	—	17 Feb.
4	(Kuwait) Kazma	3	0	0	3	1	10	−9	0		25 Nov.	8 Dec.	1–2	—

Updated to match(es) played on 4 November 2026. Source: GSA
Rules for classification: Group stage tiebreakers
14 October 2026
19:00 UTC+3

Al-Ettifaq (Saudi Arabia)	2–0	(Kuwait) Kazma
Duda 27'; Larsson 90+2'	Report

Al-Ettifaq Club Stadium, Dammam
Referee: Mohamed Al-Harmoodi (United Arab Emirates)
14 October 2026
20:00 UTC+4

Ajman (United Arab Emirates)	5–4	(Iraq) Erbil
Henrique 19', 38', 74' (pen.); Azaro 60'; Al-Taay 70' (o.g.)	Report	Miullen 14', 25'; Jamous 20'; Eze 68'

Ajman Stadium, Ajman
Referee: Mohammed Al-Manai (Oman)

27 October 2026
17:00 UTC+3

Kazma (Kuwait)	1–2	(United Arab Emirates) Ajman
Knöll 56'	Report	Lourency 4'; Azaro 36'

Al-Sadaqua Walsalam Stadium, Kuwait City
Referee: Ismaeel Habib Ali (Bahrain)
28 October 2026
18:30 UTC+4

Erbil (Iraq)	3–0 (Note: The match was awarded as a 3–0 win to Erbil after Al-Ettifaq failed to turn up for the game.)	(Saudi Arabia) Al-Ettifaq
	Report

Franso Hariri Stadium, Erbil
Referee: Ahmed Khalil (Bahrain)

4 November 2026
21:00 UTC+4

Erbil (Iraq)	6–0	(Kuwait) Kazma
Eze 28'; Miullen 45', 48', 58', 76'; Bayesh 82'	Report

Franso Hariri Stadium, Erbil
Referee: Said Al-Mezeini (Oman)
4 November 2026
21:00 UTC+3

Al-Ettifaq (Saudi Arabia)	2–0	(United Arab Emirates) Ajman
Kanté 52'; Gluščević 90+7'	Report

Al-Ettifaq Club Stadium, Dammam
Referee: Hussain Al-Showaikh (Bahrain)

24 November 2026
19:30 UTC+4

Ajman (United Arab Emirates)	v	(Saudi Arabia) Al-Ettifaq
	Report

Ajman Stadium, Ajman
25 November 2026
17:00 UTC+3

Kazma (Kuwait)	v	(Iraq) Erbil
	Report

Al-Sadaqua Walsalam Stadium, Kuwait City

8 December 2026
17:00 UTC+3

Kazma (Kuwait)	v	(Saudi Arabia) Al-Ettifaq
	Report

Al-Sadaqua Walsalam Stadium, Kuwait City
8 December 2026
19:30 UTC+4

Erbil (Iraq)	v	(United Arab Emirates) Ajman
	Report

Franso Hariri Stadium, Erbil

17 February 2027
21:30 UTC+3

Al-Ettifaq (Saudi Arabia)	v	(Iraq) Erbil
	Report

Al-Ettifaq Club Stadium, Dammam
17 February 2027
22:30 UTC+4

Ajman (United Arab Emirates)	v	(Kuwait) Kazma
	Report

Ajman Stadium, Ajman

=== Ranking of third-placed teams ===
The two best third-placed teams from the three groups advance to the knockout stage along with the three group winners and three runners-up.

Pos	Grp	Team	Pld	W	D	L	GF	GA	GD	Pts	Qualification
1	A	(Qatar) Al-Duhail	3	2	0	1	5	4	+1	6	Advance to knockout stage
2	C	(United Arab Emirates) Ajman	3	2	0	1	7	7	0	6	Advance to knockout stage
3	B	(Iraq) Al-Zawraa	3	0	2	1	2	3	−1	2	

Updated to match(es) played on 4 November 2026. Source: GSA

== Knockout stage ==
The knockout stage will be held on a home-and-away basis, with the quarter-final matches taking place from 2–17 March 2027, and the semi-finals and final taking place from 23–30 April 2027.

=== Bracket ===
Quarter-finals

Semi-finals

Final

== Prize money and awards ==
=== Prize money ===
Position	Amount (USD)
Champions	3,000,000
Runners-up	1,000,000

== See also ==
- 2026–27 ASEAN Club Championship
