= Yordanos Abay =

Ethiopian football player

Personal information
- Full name: Yordanos Getahun Abay
- Date of birth: 28 March 1984 (age 42)
- Place of birth: Dire Dawa, Ethiopia
- Position: Striker

Senior career*
Years	Team	Apps	(Gls)
1999–2000	Dire Dawa Textile Factory or formerly Cotton Company of Ethiopia		
2000–2002	EEPCO		(44)
2002	Vitesse Arnhem	0	(0)
2002–2003	Ethiopian Coffee		(14)
2003–2012	Al-Saqr		(100)
2012–2017	EEPCO		

International career^{‡}
2002–2003	Ethiopia	4	(0)
- * Club domestic league appearances and goals as of 10:13, 28 January 2015 (UTC) ‡ National team caps and goals as of 10:13, 28 January 2015 (UTC)

Yordanos Abay (Amharic: ዮርዳኖስ ዓባይ, Arabic: يوردانوس أباي, born 28 March 1984) is a retired Ethiopian international footballer.

== Career ==
=== Club career ===
Abay has played club football in Ethiopia, the Netherlands, and Yemen for Dire Dawa Railway, EEPCO, Vitesse Arnhem, Ethiopian Coffee and Al-Saqr.

=== International career ===
Abay played at the 2001 FIFA World Youth Championship, and made his senior debut that same year. He has appeared in FIFA World Cup qualifying matches.

== Honours ==
Individual

- Yemen League top goalscorer: 2003–04, 2004–05
