= Esteghlal Cup =

Yemen Football Competition

The Esteghlal Cup was an association football competition run by the Yemen Football Association (YFA). It was played between 2006 until 2008

== Finals ==
Season	Winner	Score	Runner-up
2006	Al Ahli San'a'	0 - 0; 4 - 2 penalties	Hassan Abyan
2007	Mueen	1 - 1; 4 - 2 penalties	Al-Shula
2008	Al Sha'ab Ibb	3 - 1	Al Ain
