= 2006 Yemeni League =

Yemeni League
- Season: 2005–06
- Champions: Al-Saqr
- Matches: 182
- Goals: 503 (2.76 per match)

Statistics of the Yemeni League in the 2005–06 season.

== Final table ==
Pos	Team	Pld	W	D	L	GF	GA	GD	Pts	Relegation
1	Al-Saqr (Taizz)	26	16	7	3	49	20	+29	55	
2	Al-Sha'ab (Ibb)	26	14	6	6	51	32	+19	48	
3	Al-Tilal (Aden)	26	13	4	9	42	35	+7	43	
4	Al-Ahli (Sanaa)	26	12	6	8	44	35	+9	42	
5	Al-Hilal (Hudayda)	26	11	7	8	45	37	+8	40	
6	Hassan (Abyan)	26	11	7	8	29	25	+4	40	
7	Al-Rasheed (Taizz)	26	11	4	11	27	30	−3	37	
8	Al-Sha'ab Hadramaut (Mukalla)	26	10	5	11	31	45	−14	35	
9	Shula (Aden)	26	8	10	8	31	29	+2	34	
10	Yarmuk al-Rawda (Sanaa)	26	9	7	10	28	32	−4	34	
11	Al-Tadamun (Shabwa)	26	10	2	14	35	45	−10	32	Relegated
12	Shabab al-Jeel (Hudayda)	26	7	6	13	29	37	−8	27	Relegated
13	May 22 (Sanaa)	26	5	5	16	29	49	−20	20	Relegated
14	Al-Taawun (Badan)	26	4	6	16	33	52	−19	18	Relegated

Source: rsssf.com
