= 2002–03 Yemeni League =

Yemeni League
- Season: 2002–03
- Champions: Shaab Ibb
- Matches: 132
- Goals: 314 (2.38 per match)

In the 2002–03 Yemeni League, Al-Sha'ab Ibb won the championship.

== Final table ==
Pos	Team	Pld	W	D	L	GF	GA	GD	Pts	Relegation
1	Al-Sha'ab Ibb	22	14	4	4	37	15	+22	46	
2	Al-Tilal Aden	22	13	4	5	36	20	+16	43	
3	Al-Hilal Hudayda	22	9	9	4	22	19	+3	36	
4	Al-Sha'ab Hadramaut	22	8	8	6	25	23	+2	32	
5	Al-Ahli Sana	22	7	8	7	22	20	+2	29	
6	Al-Wahda Sana	22	7	6	9	34	29	+5	27	
7	Al-Saqr Taizz	22	7	5	10	22	25	−3	26	
8	Hassan Abyan	22	6	7	9	25	29	−4	25	
9	May 22 Sana	22	5	10	7	24	28	−4	25	
10	Al-Ahli Hudayda	22	5	9	8	22	29	−7	24	
11	Al-Sha'ab Sana	22	5	8	9	23	28	−5	23	Relegated
12	Shabab Al-Jeel Hudayda	22	5	4	13	22	49	−27	19	Relegated
