= 1990–91 Yemeni League =

Yemeni League
- Season: 1990–91
- Champions: Al-Tilal
- Asian Club Championship: Al-Tilal
- Asian Cup Winners Cup: Al-Ahli (San'a')

The 1990–91 Yemeni League was the first season after the unification of North and South Yemen.

It was decided to set up a 4-level league system: Premier, First, Second and Third divisions.

Sixteen northern and sixteen southern clubs entered the top level championship in the 1990–91 season. Previously, two separate championships were used for North Yemen and South Yemen.

Al-Tilal won the first ever unified championship, although it is unclear whom they beat in the final of the competition. On claiming the championship, Al-Tilal would also qualify for the 1991-92 Asian Club Championship, Asia's premier club event

== Structure ==
The season was played in three stages. The first stage featured four groups of 8 teams. The group winners would advance to stage two which was in effect a semi-final stage. The winners would go through to the final

=== First stage ===
Played in 4 groups of 8 clubs each, all groups having 4 northern and 4 southern clubs; groups played as double round robin.

==== Participants (by province) ====
- Group 1: Sana, Taizz, Ibb, Dhamar, Aden(2), Hadramaut, Abyan
- Group 2: Sana(2), Taizz(2), Aden(2), Hadramaut, Lahaj
- Group 3: Sana(2), Hudaydah, Ibb, Aden, Hadramaut(2), Lahaj
- Group 4: Sana, Hudaydah(3), Aden, Hadramaut, Abyan(2)

Top-4 of each group played first level 1991/92; bottom-4 of each group played 2nd level 1991/92

=== Second Phase (in Sana) ===
- 3 southern and 1 northern club qualified; 2 southern clubs reached the final

=== Semifinals ===
Unclear which teams took part winners 1 - winners 3 winners 2 - winners 4

=== Final ===
Al-Tilal (Aden) bt [?]

== Champions ==
1990–91 Yemeni League

Al-Tilal
1st title
