= Jiab Bashafaay =

Yemeni footballer (born 1974)

Personal information
- Full name: Jiab Abd Rabbuh Bashafaay
- Date of birth: 1974 (age 51–52)
- Place of birth: Al Kawd, Yemen
- Position: Forward

Senior career*
Years	Team	Apps	(Gls)
1989–1998	Hassan		
1998–2003	Al-Hilal		

International career
- Yemen

Managerial career
- Hassan Abyan
- * Club domestic league appearances and goals

Jiab Abd Rabbuh Bashafaay (Arabic: جياب باشافعي) is a Yemeni former footballer and manager who played as a forward.

== Life and career ==
Bashafaay was born in 1974 in Al Kawd, Yemen. He has four siblings. He is the younger brother of Yemeni footballer Ali Bashafaay. He has been nicknamed "Ghost". He has been married. He started his career with Hassan. He wore the number seven jersey while playing for the club. He was the top scorer of the 1994–95 Yemeni League with twenty-five goals. After that, he signed for Al-Hilal. He wore the number seven and number fifteen jerseys while playing for the club.

He is a Yemen international. He played for the Yemen national football team at the 1994 Qatar Independence Cup. He also played for the Yemen national football team at 1996 AFC Asian Cup qualification and 1998 FIFA World Cup qualification. He was described as "considered one of the brightest and most prominent stars that the young governorate produced in the early nineties". He obtained the AFC B License. He managed Al-Hilal. He helped the club win the 2005 Yemeni President Cup.
