= 2007–08 Yemeni League =

Yemeni League
- Season: 2007–08
- Champions: Al-Hilal
- Matches: 182
- Goals: 401 (2.2 per match)

Statistics of the Yemeni League in the 2007–08 season.

== Final table ==
Pos	Team	Pld	W	D	L	GF	GA	GD	Pts	Relegation
1	Al-Hilal (Hudayda)	26	16	3	7	36	17	+19	51	
2	Al-Ahli (Sanaa)	26	11	10	5	38	23	+15	43	
3	Shula (Aden)	26	13	4	9	39	32	+7	43	
4	Al-Saqr (Taizz)	26	11	8	7	33	26	+7	41	
5	Al-Sha'ab Hadramaut (Mukalla)	26	11	7	8	23	22	+1	40	
6	Yarmuk al-Rawda (Sanaa)	26	11	6	9	20	19	+1	39	
7	Hassan (Abyan)	26	10	7	9	31	34	−3	37	
8	Al-Sha'ab (Ibb)	26	10	5	11	30	29	+1	35	
9	Al-Rasheed (Taizz)	26	10	4	12	34	33	+1	34	
10	Al-Wahda (Aden)	26	10	4	12	23	29	−6	34	
11	Al-Wahda (Sanaa)	26	8	8	10	29	29	0	32	Relegated
12	Shabab al-Jeel (Hudayda)	26	7	8	11	28	37	−9	29	Relegated
13	Al-Ahli (Taizz)	26	5	11	10	20	34	−14	26	Relegated
14	May 22 (Sanaa)	26	4	5	17	17	37	−20	17	Relegated

Source: rsssf.com
