= 2002 Yemeni League =

Yemeni League
- Season: 2001–02

Statistics of the Yemeni League in the 2001–02 season.

== Final table ==
Pos	Team	Pld	W	D	L	GF	GA	GD	Pts	Relegation
1	Al-Wahda Sanaa	25	20	3	2	42	15	+27	63	
2	Al-Ahli Sanaa	24	15	5	4	45	19	+26	50	
3	Al-Hilal Hudayda	25	11	6	8	36	29	+7	39	
4	Shabab Al-Jeel Hudayda	23	9	7	7	26	24	+2	34	
5	Hassan Abyan	25	9	7	9	32	36	−4	34	
6	Al-Sha'ab Ibb	25	8	9	8	31	27	+4	33	
7	Al-Tilal Aden	23	9	6	8	28	31	−3	33	
8	Al-Ittihad Ibb	23	9	4	10	31	28	+3	31	Relegated
9	Al-Sha'ab Sanaa	24	8	7	9	25	27	−2	31	
10	Shabab Baydha	25	8	7	10	25	33	−8	31	Relegated
11	Al-Sha'ab Hadramaut	22	8	4	10	26	26	0	28	
12	Al-Saqr Taizz	24	5	7	12	20	24	−4	22	
13	Al-Taawun Baadan	23	5	3	15	16	33	−17	18	Relegated
14	Al-Tali'aa Taizz	23	4	3	16	14	45	−31	15	Relegated

Source: rsssf.com
