= Al Tilal Aden =

Al-Tilal Aden is a Yemeni professional basketball club based in Aden. The club has competed in the Yemen's D1 League.

== See also ==
- Al-Tilal SC
