= 1991–92 Yemeni League =

Yemeni League
- Season: 1991–92
- Champions: Al-Ahli (San'a')

The 1991–92 Yemeni League was the second season of top-flight football in the Yemen.

The season was played from November 1991 till September 1992 and featured 16 clubs, but unlike the previous season, the league winners Al-Ahli (San'a') would not take part in any continental competition.

== Champions ==
Top of Table
Pos.	Team	Pts.
1.	Al-Ahly Sanaa	44
2.	Al-Tilal Aden	41
3.	Al-Shula Aden	35

1991–92 Yemeni League

Al-Ahli (San'a')

== Continental Competition ==
=== Asian Club Championship ===
Defending champions Al-Tilal came 2nd and also featured in the 1991-92 Asian Club Championship. They defeated Bahraini league champions West Riffa in the first round before coming up against Iranian Qods League winners Esteghlal whom went on to reach the final.

=== Asian Cup Winners Cup ===
Al-Ahli (San'a') entered the 1992 Asian Cup Winners Cup where they were given a bye in the first round before coming up against Al-Nassr of Saudi Arabia in the 2nd round and beaten 2-0 over two games.
