= Naseem Cup =

The Naseem Cup was an association football competition run by the Yemen Football Association (YFA). It lasted for two seasons before being dissolved.

Al-Tilal won both editions that were played.

== Finals ==
Season	Winner	Score	Runner-up
2000	Al-Tilal	2 - 2; 3 - 2 penalties	Al-Wahda (San'a')
2003	Al-Tilal	2 - 0	Al Ahli San'a'
