= 2007 Yemeni League =

Yemeni League
- Season: 2006–07
- Champions: Al-Ahli
- Matches: 182
- Goals: 410 (2.25 per match)

Statistics of the Yemeni League in the 2006–07 season.

== Final table ==
Pos	Team	Pld	W	D	L	GF	GA	GD	Pts	Relegation
1	Al-Ahli (Sanaa)	26	12	12	2	39	9	+30	48	
2	Hassan (Abyan)	26	14	3	9	31	36	−5	45	
3	Al-Saqr (Taizz)	26	12	7	7	41	25	+16	43	
4	Al-Sha'ab (Ibb)	26	11	6	9	32	27	+5	39	
5	Al-Sha'ab Hadramaut (Mukalla)	26	11	4	11	27	28	−1	37	
6	Yarmuk al-Rawda (Sanaa)	26	8	12	6	26	18	+8	36	
7	Al-Hilal (Hudayda)	26	10	6	10	35	32	+3	36	
8	Al-Rasheed (Taizz)	26	9	8	9	21	19	+2	35	
9	Shula (Aden)	26	8	11	7	27	30	−3	35	
10	Al-Tilal (Aden)	26	8	10	8	29	23	+6	34	
11	Al-Wahda (Sanaa)	26	10	4	12	31	34	−3	34	
12	Al-Ittihad (Ibb)	26	8	9	9	27	27	0	33	Relegated
13	Al-Shabab (al-Baydaa)	26	5	7	14	28	45	−17	22	Relegated
14	Al-Nasir (al-Dalaa)	26	4	5	17	16	57	−41	17	Relegated

Source: rsssf.com
