= Ali Muhsin al-Murisi Cup =

The Ali Muhsin al-Murisi Cup was an association football competition run by the Yemen Football Association (YFA). One edition was played in 2003.

== Finals ==
Season	Winner	Score	Runner-up
2003	Al-Tilal	1 - 0	Al-Saqr
