= May 22 San'a =

Association football club in Yemen

May 22 San'a is a football club playing in the Yemeni Second Division League, founded in 2001.

== Stadium ==
22 May Stadium is their home field; it has a capacity of 27,000.

== Achievements ==
=== Yemeni Unity Cup ===
- Winner (1): 2007

== See also ==
- List of football clubs in Yemen
