= Yemeni League =

Association football league in Yemen

- Founded: 1990
- Country: Yemen
- Confederation: AFC
- Number of clubs: 14
- Level on pyramid: 1
- Relegation to: Yemeni Second Division
- Domestic cup: President Cup
- International cup(s): AFC Challenge League; AGCFF Gulf Club Champions League
- Most championships: Al-Ahli San'a (11 titles)
- Top scorer: Ali Al-Nono (163 goals)
- Broadcaster(s): Yemen Shabab TV
- Website: Website
- Current: 2025–26 Yemeni League

The Yemeni League (also known as the Yemen Division 1 or the Yemen First Division) is the top football division of the Yemen Football Association. It was created in 1990 after the unification of North and South Yemen. It was set up as a four-level system with the Premier, First, Second and Third divisions. 16 northern and southern clubs entered the top level championship in the 1990–91 season.

Currently, 14 clubs play at the top level, with four clubs being relegated to the second tier. The season is generally run from early November to late June with the league winners entering the AFC Challenge League and the Arab Champions League. The league was cancelled from 2014 to 2021 due to the Yemeni Civil War, which also stopped all other footballing activities in Yemen.

== Clubs ==
Locations of teams in the 2023–24 Yemeni League

Club	Location	Stadium	Capacity
Al-Saqr Ta'izz	Ta'izz	Al Shohada Stadium	32,000
Salam Al-Garfa	Al Garfa	Al Garfa Stadium	
Al-Sha'ab Hadramaut	Mukalla	Baradem Mukalla Stadium	15,000
Al-Ahli San'a	San'a	Ali Muhesen Stadium	25,000
Al-Tali'aa Taizz	Ta'izz	Al Shohada Stadium	32,000
Al-Oruba Zabid	Zabid	Ali Muhesen Stadium	25,000
Al-Yarmuk Al-Rawda	San'a	Ali Muhesen Stadium	25,000
Al-Wahda San'a	San'a	Ali Muhesen Stadium	25,000
Al Sha'ab Ibb	Ibb	22 May Stadium	40,000
Al-Hilal Hudayda	Al Hudaydah	Al Ulufi Stadium	2,000
Fahman SCC	Mudiyah	Mudiyah Stadium	
Al-Tadamun Hadramaut	Mukalla	Baradem Mukalla Stadium	15,000
Al-Ittihad Ibb	Ibb	May 22 Stadium	40,000
Samaon	San'a	Ali Muhesen Stadium	25,000

== Champions (pre-unification) ==
No.	Season	North Yemen	South Yemen
1	1970–71	Not held	Al-Tilal Aden
2	1971–72	Not held	
3	1972–73	Not held	
4	1973–74	Not held	
5	1974–75	Not held	
6	1975–76	Not held	Al-Wahda Aden
7	1976–77	Not held	Al-Tilal Aden
8	1977–78	Not held	
9	1978–79	Al-Wahda San'a	
10	1979–80	Al-Zuhra	Al-Tilal Aden
11	1980–81	Al-Ahli San'a	
12	1981–82	Al-Sha'ab San'a	Al-Tilal Aden
13	1982–83	Al-Ahli San'a	Al-Tilal Aden
14	1983–84	Al-Ahli San'a	Al-Shorta Aden
15	1984–85	Not held	
16	1985–86	Al-Shorta Sana'a'	
17	1986–87	Not held	Al Tilal Aden
18	1987–88	Al-Ahli San'a	Al-Wahda Aden
19	1988–89	Al-Yarmuk Al-Rawda	Al-Wahda Aden
20	1989–90	Al-Yarmuk Al-Rawda	Al-Shula Aden

== Yemeni League champions ==
No.	Season	Champion	Runner-up	Third place	Top scorers	Top scorer club(s)	Goals
1	1990–91	Al-Tilal Aden	Al-Mena	Al-Ahli San'a	(Yemen) Munif Shaif	Al-Mena	16
2	1991–92	Al-Ahli San'a	Al-Tilal Aden	Al-Shula Aden	(Yemen) Sharaf Mahfood	Al-Tilal Aden	30
	1992–93	Not held					
3	1993–94	Al-Ahli San'a	Hassan Abyan	Al-Wahda Aden	(Yemen) Mohammad Al-Azazy	Al Zuhra	19
4	1994–95	Al-Wahda San'a	Al-Ahli San'a	Hassan Abyan	(Yemen) Jiab Bashafaay	Hassan Abyan	25
	1995–96	Not held					
5	1996–97	Al-Wahda San'a	Al-Tilal Aden	Al-Ahly Al Hudaydah	(Yemen) Jameel Al-Maktry	Shamsan Aden	21
6	1997–98	Al-Wahda San'a	Al-Ahli San'a	Al-Shula Aden	(Yemen) Adel Al-Salimi	Al-Ahli San'a	20
7	1998–99	Al-Ahli San'a	Al-Wahda San'a	Al-Sha'ab Ibb	(Yemen) Fathi Jabir	Al-Tilal Aden	22
8	1999–2000	Al-Ahli San'a	Al-Tali'aa Taizz	Al-Wahda San'a	(Yemen) Adel Al-Salimi	Al-Ahli San'a	17
9	2000–01	Al-Ahli San'a	Al-Sha'ab Ibb	Al-Tilal Aden	(Yemen) Ali Al-Nono	Al-Ahli San'a	24
10	2001–02	Al-Wahda San'a	Al-Ahli San'a	Al-Hilal Al-Sahili	(Yemen) Adel Al-Salimi	Al-Ahli San'a	18
11	2002–03	Al-Sha'ab Ibb	Al-Tilal Aden	Al-Hilal Al-Sahili	(Yemen) Fekri Al-Hubaishi	Al-Sha'ab Ibb	13
12	2003–04	Al-Sha'ab Ibb	Al-Ahli San'a	Al-Tilal Aden	(Ethiopia) Yordanos Abay	Al-Saqr Ta'izz	15
13	2004–05	Al-Tilal Aden	Al-Saqr Ta'izz	Al-Ahli San'a	(Ethiopia) Yordanos Abay	Al-Saqr Ta'izz	16
14	2005–06	Al-Saqr Ta'izz	Al-Sha'ab Ibb	Al-Tilal Aden	(Yemen) Fekri Al-Hubaishi	Al-Sha'ab Ibb	26
15	2006–07	Al-Ahli San'a	Hassan Abyan	Al-Saqr Ta'izz	(Ethiopia) Berhanu Kaseem	Al-Hilal Al-Sahili	15
16	2007–08	Al-Hilal Al-Sahili	Al-Ahli San'a	Al-Shula Aden	(Yemen) Ali Al-Nono	Al-Ahli San'a	11
17	2008–09	Al-Hilal Al-Sahili	Al-Ahli San'a	Al-Saqr Ta'izz	(Ethiopia) Lomi Antita	Al-Ahli San'a	13
18	2009–10	Al-Saqr Ta'izz	Al-Tilal Aden	Shabab Al Baydaa	(Republic of the Congo) Amboio (Mboyo Iyomi)	Al-Saqr Ta'izz	15
19	2010–11	Al-Oruba Zabid	Al-Tilal Aden	Al-Ahli San'a	(Ethiopia) Tesfaye Tafese	Al-Tilal Aden	14
20	2011–12	Al-Sha'ab Ibb	Al-Ittihad Ibb	Al-Oruba Zabid	(Egypt) Shaaban Naggar	Al-Oruba Zabid	14
21	2013	Al Yarmuk Al Rawda	Al-Sha'ab Hadramaut	Al-Saqr Ta'izz			
22	2013–14	Al-Saqr Ta'izz	Al-Ahli San'a	Al-Tilal Aden			
~~23~~	2014–15	Cancelled					
	2015–16	Not held					
	2016–17	Not held					
	2017–18	Not held					
	2018–19	Not held					
23	2020	Al-Shaab Hadramaut	Al-Wehda Aden				
	2020–21	Not held					
24	2021–22	Fahman SCC	Al-Wehda Sanaa	Ahli Sanaa			
	2022–23	Not held					
25	2023–24	Ahli Sanaa	Al-Tadamun Hadramaut	Al-Shaab Hadramaut			
	2024–25	Not held					
26	2025–26						

== Total titles won ==
Club	Winners	Runners-up	Third places
Al-Ahli Sana'a	11	7	4
Al-Tilal Aden	8	5	4
Al-Wahda Sana'a	5	2	1
Al-Sha'ab Ibb	3	2	1
Al-Saqr Ta'izz	3	1	3
Al-Wahda Aden	3	1	1
Al Yarmuk Al Rawda	3	—	—
Al-Hilal Al-Sahili	2	—	2
Al-Sha'ab Hadramaut	1	1	1
Al-Shula Aden	1	—	3
Al-Oruba Zabid	1	—	1
Al-Zuhra	1	—	—
Al-Sha'ab San'a	1	—	—
Al-Shorta Sana'a'	1	—	—
Al-Shorta Aden	1	—	—
Fahman SCC	1	—	—
Al-Ittihad Ibb	—	1	—
Al-Tadamun Hadramaut	—	1	—

- Al Yarmuk Al Rawda won championships in 1989 and 1990 as Al Yarmouk San'a'

== Total titles won by town or city ==
Sixteen clubs from a total of seven towns and cities have been champions.

Town or city	Number of titles	Clubs
San'a'	23	Al-Ahli (11), Al-Wahda (5), Al Yarmouk (3), Al-Oruba (1), Al-Zuhra (1), Al-Sha'ab (1), Al-Shorta Sana'a (1)
Aden	13	Al-Tilal (8), Al-Wahda (3), Al-Shula (1), Al-Shorta Aden (1)
Ta'izz	3	Al-Saqr (3)
Ibb	2	Al-Sha'ab (2)
Al Hudaydah	2	Al-Hilal (2)
Mukalla	1	Al-Sha'ab Hadramaut (1)
Mudiyah	1	Fahman SCC (1)

== Top goalscorers ==
=== All-time top scorers ===
As of 6 July 2013

Rank	Player	Goals	Years
1	(Yemen) Ali Al-Nono	163	1999–2014
2	(Yemen) Adel Al-Salimi	136	1997–2011
3	(Yemen) Sharaf Mahfood	121	1985–2005
4	(Yemen) Fathi Jabir	108	1997–2008
5	(Ethiopia) Yordanos Abay	100	2003–2012

=== Top scorers by season ===
Season	Player	Club	Goals
1996–97	(Yemen) Jameel Al-Maktry	Shamsan Aden	21
2002–03	(Yemen) Fikri Al-Habishi		13
2003–04	(Ethiopia) Yordanos Abay	Al-Saqr	15
2004–05	(Ethiopia) Yordanos Abay	Al-Saqr	15
2005–06	(Yemen) Fekri Al-Hubaishi	Shaab Ibb	26
2006–07	(Ethiopia) Berhanu Kaseem		15
2007–08	(Yemen) Ali Al-Nono	Al-Ahli	11
2008–09	(Ethiopia) Lomi Antita		13
2009–10	(Republic of the Congo) Amboio		15
2010–11	(Ethiopia) Tesfaye Tafese	Al-Tilal	15
2011–12	(Yemen) Shaaban Naggar	Al Oruba	14
