= Al Bayda, Yemen =

Al-Bayda ٱلْبَيْضَاء
- Town
- Location in Yemen
- Coordinates: 13°58′35″N 45°34′15″E
- Country: Yemen
- Governorate: Al Bayda Governorate
- District: Al Bayda

Government
  - Governor: Nasser al Khader Abderbo al-Sawadi

Population (2011)
  - Total: 29,853
- Time zone: UTC+3 (Yemen Standard Time)

Al Bayda (Arabic: ٱلْبَيْضَاء, romanized: Al-Bayḍāʾ, lit. 'The white one', not to be confused with Al-Bayda' in Al Jawf, the ancient Nashaq), also known as Baida, Al-Baidhah or Beida, is a town in the Governorate of Al Bayda in Yemen.

It is located 130 miles (210 kilometres) SE of Sanaa. Rada' (Arabic: رَدَاع, romanized: Radāʿ) is the present capital of the Governorate of Al Bayda.

== History ==
It is the historical capital of the Beda Sultanate from 1636 until 1930.

On 8 October 2014, at least nine people were killed in an attack by Al-Qaeda militants on security and government buildings in the town, officials say. The official Saba News Agency said car bombs were used in the dawn assault, which was repelled.

In July 2021, al-Bayda was the site of intense fighting between Yemeni government-backed forces (aided by their ally Saudi Arabia) on the one hand and Houthi fighters on the other.

== Climate ==
Al Bayda' has a cool semi-arid climate (Köppen BSk). The summer season has very warm afternoons and cool mornings, whilst in the winter afternoons are warm but with the clear skies and high altitude mornings are chilly and frosts are not uncommon. More than half of the approximately 400 millimetres or 16 inches of rain each year falls between July and September, although around one quarter occurs in April and May.

Climate data for Al Bayda'
Month	Jan	Feb	Mar	Apr	May	Jun	Jul	Aug	Sep	Oct	Nov	Dec	Year
Mean daily maximum °C (°F)	19.1 (66.4)	20.6 (69.1)	23 (73)	23.1 (73.6)	24.6 (76.3)	26.7 (80.1)	24.4 (75.9)	23.7 (74.7)	23.8 (74.8)	22.1 (71.8)	19.5 (67.1)	19 (66)	22.5 (72.4)
Daily mean °C (°F)	10.1 (50.2)	10.9 (51.6)	14.1 (57.4)	14.8 (58.6)	16.7 (62.1)	17.9 (64.2)	18.2 (64.8)	17.7 (63.9)	16.6 (61.9)	14.7 (58.5)	12.2 (54.0)	11.2 (52.2)	14.6 (58.3)
Mean daily minimum °C (°F)	1.2 (34.2)	1.3 (34.3)	5.2 (41.4)	6.6 (43.9)	8.8 (47.8)	9.1 (48.4)	12.1 (53.8)	11.7 (53.1)	9.5 (49.1)	7.4 (45.3)	5 (41)	3.4 (38.1)	6.8 (44.2)
Average rainfall mm (inches)	7 (0.3)	10 (0.4)	19 (0.7)	51 (2.0)	45 (1.8)	15 (0.6)	81 (3.2)	120 (4.7)	35 (1.4)	6 (0.2)	7 (0.3)	3 (0.1)	399 (15.7)
Source: Climate-Data.org

== Population ==
According to the 2011 Yemeni census, its population is 29,853.
