= Al-Oruba (Zabid) =

Association football club in Yemen

- Full name: Sporting Cultural Club Al-Oruba Zabid
- Nicknames: Al-Ghadhab Al-Ahmar (Arabic: الغضب الأحمر) (The Red Fury); Al-Shayateen Al-Homr (Arabic: الشياطين الحمر) (The Red Devils); Al-Qalaat Al-Hamra'a (Arabic: القلعة الحمراء) (The Red Castle); Al-Ghalebiyyat Al-Arabiyyah (Arabic: الغالبية العربية) (The Country's Arab majority)
- Founded: 2008; 18 years ago
- Ground: Ali Muhesen Stadium; Sanaa, Yemen
- Capacity: 25,000
- Owner: Yahya Mohammed
- President: Yahya Mohammed
- Head coach: Mohammed Al-Nufiay
- League: Yemeni League
Home colours	Away colours

Sporting Cultural Club Al-Oruba Zabid (Arabic: نادي العروبة الرياضي الثقافي) is a Yemeni professional football club based in Sanaa. The club was founded in 2008.

== Club history ==
Al-Oruba Club is the team advanced in the Yemeni League in the football. A new club with a long history is the result of integrating the Al-Amn Al-Markazi Club, a Al-Sbaeen Club sport, and Kaalaty sports history:

- Al-Qadisiyya Club in the year 1977.
- PHYSICAL ACTIVITY Central Yemeni security forces in 1980.
- Al-Mithaq Club in 1997.
- Al-Sbaeen Club in 2004.
- Al-Amn Al-Markazi Club in 2006.
- Al-Oruba Club in 2008.

=== Seasons ===
Al-Oruba Sport Club
Season	Pos.	President Cup	Super Cup	Unity Cup	AFC
2008–09	2	Quarter-finals	–	D N P	–
2009–10	6	Semi-finals	–	Round of 32	–
2010–11	1	Not held	–	Not held	–
2011–12		Not held	Champion	Not held	Group stage

== Achievements ==
- Yemeni League: 1

2010–11

- Yemeni Super Cup: 1

2011

== Performance in AFC competitions ==
- AFC Cup: 1 appearance
  - 2012 Group stage

== See also ==
- 2010–11 season
- 2011–12 season
- List of football clubs in Yemen
