= Ahli Taiz Club =

Association football club in Yemen

Ahli Taiz Club (Arabic: نادي أهلي تعز) is a Yemeni football club based in Ta'izz, Yemen.

== Achievements ==
- Yemeni Presidents Cup
  - Winners (1): 2012
- Yemeni Super Cup
  - Runners-up (1): 2013

== Performance in AFC competitions ==
- AFC Cup: 1 appearance

2013: Group Stage
