= 22 May Stadium =

Sports venue in Aden, Yemen

- ملعب ٢٢ مايو
- Interactive map of 22 May Stadium
- Coordinates: 12°51′55″N 45°0′45″E

The 22 May Stadium is a multi-purpose stadium in Aden, Yemen, with a capacity of 30,000. It has been primarily used for football matches, and served as the home stadium of Al-Tilal SC and Al-Wehda SC. The stadium was mostly destroyed in 2015 during the Yemeni Civil War.
