= Al-Wehda SC (Aden) =

Association football club in Yemen

- Full name: Al-Wehda Sports Cultural and Social Club
- Founded: 1924; 102 years ago
- Ground: May 22 Stadium; Aden, Yemen
- Capacity: 30,000
Home colours	Away colours

Al-Wehda Sports Club (Aden) (Arabic: نادي الوحدة الرياضي الثقافي) is a Yemeni professional football club based in Sheikh Othman, Aden. The club was founded in 1924 and last competed in the Yemeni League.

== Founding ==
Al-Wahda Sports Club is the second club to be established in Yemen after Al-Tilal. It was established on July 17, 1924, after a series of integration of the club's in the town of Sheikh Othman.

== Achievements ==
- South Yemeni League: 3

1975–76, 1987–88, 1988–89

- Yemeni President Cup: 1

2017

== See also ==
- List of football clubs in Yemen
