= Yemeni President Cup =

Association football tournament in Yemen

- Founded: 1995
- Abolished: 2017
- Region: Yemen
- Last champions: Al-Wehda (2017)
- Most championships: Al-Ahli (San'a') (3 titles)
- Website: Official website

The Yemen President Cup is the top knockout tournament of Yemeni football.

== List of finals ==
=== By year ===
Year	Champions	Goals	Score	Goals	Runners-up
1995–96	Al-Ahli (Hudaida)		1–0		Al-Sha'ab Hadramaut
1998	Al-Ittihad Ibb		1–0		Al-Shula
2000	Al-Sha'ab Hadramaut		0–0 (5–4 pen.)		Al-Shula
2001	Al-Ahli (San'a')		2–1		Al-Tilal
2001–02	Al-Sha'ab Ibb		4–0		Al Tadamun Shabwa
2002–03	Al-Sha'ab Ibb		2–1		Al-Sha'ab Hadramaut
2003–04	Al-Ahli (San'a')		2–0		Al-Sha'ab Ibb
2005	Al-Hilal (Al Hudaydah)	Mohannd 70'; Issam 85'; Basuhai 93'	3–1	Jerisa 3'	Al Rasheed Ta'izz
2006	Al-Sha'ab Hadramaut	Shaaban 81'; AL-Jamhi 90'	2–1	Al-Safi 3'	Al-Hilal (Al Hudaydah)
2007	Al-Tilal	Imboyu 75'	1–0		Al-Hilal (Al Hudaydah)
2008	Al-Hilal (Al Hudaydah)		2–0		Al-Sha'ab Hadramaut
2009	Al-Ahli (San'a')		0–0 (5–4 pen.)		Al-Sha'ab Hadramaut
2010	Al-Tilal	Lomi 10'; Gardi 90'	2–1	AL-Abidi 71'	Shabab Al Baydaa
2011	Not played				
2012	Al-Ahli Taizz		1–0		Al-Tali'aa Taizz
2013	Not played				
2014	Al Saqr		5–1		Shabab Mansoura
2015–2016	Not played				
2017	Al-Wehda		1–0		Shamsan

== Championships by club ==
Club	Champions	Runners-up	Years won	Years Lost
Al-Ahli (San'a')	3	—	2001, 2004, 2009	—
Al-Sha'ab Hadramaut	2	4	2000, 2006	1996, 2003, 2008, 2009
Al-Hilal (Al Hudaydah)	2	2	2005, 2008	2006, 2007
Al-Tilal	2	1	2007, 2010	2001
Al-Sha'ab Ibb	2	1	2002, 2003	2004
Al-Ahli (Hudaida)	1	—	1996	—
Al-Ittihad Ibb	1	—	1998	—
Al-Ahli Taizz	1	—	2012	—
Al Saqr	1	—	2014	—
Al-Wehda	1	—	2017	—
Al-Shula	—	2	—	1998, 2000
Al Tadamun Shabwa	—	1	—	2002
Al Rasheed Ta'izz	—	1	—	2005
Shabab Al Baydaa	—	1	—	2010
Al-Tali'aa Taizz	—	1	—	2012
Shabab Mansoura	—	1	—	2014
Shamsan	—	1	—	2017

== Total titles won by town or city ==
Town or city	Number of titles	Clubs
Aden	3	Al-Tilal (2), Al-Wehda (1)
Al Hudaydah	3	Al-Hilal (2), Al-Ahli (1)
Ibb	3	Al Sha'ab (2), Al-Ittihad (1)
San'a'	3	Al-Ahli (3)
Hadhramaut	2	Al-Sha'ab Hadramaut (2)
Ta'izz	2	Al-Ahli Taizz (1), Al Saqr (1)

== See also ==
- Yemeni League
- Yemeni Second Division
- Yemeni Third Division
- Yemeni Super Cup
