= Al-Yarmuk Al-Rawda =

Association football club in Yemen

Al-Yarmuk al-Rawda
- Full name: Al-Yarmuk Al-Rawda
- Founded: 1978; 48 years ago
- Ground: Ali Mohsen Al-Muraisi Stadium; Sanaa, Yemen
- Capacity: 25,000
- League: Yemeni League

Al-Yarmuk Al-Rawda (Arabic: اليرموك) is a Yemeni professional football club based in Sanaa. Founded in 1978, the club competes in the Yemeni League.

== Achievements ==
- Yemeni League: 3

1989, 1990, 2013

- Yemeni Super Cup: 0

Runners-up: 2014

== Performance in AFC competitions ==
- AFC Cup: 1 appearance

2014: Qualifying play-off

== Managerial history ==
Last update: 21 February 2014.

- (Syria) Mohammed Nfaiei (ca. 2014–)

== See also ==
- List of football clubs in Yemen
