= Hassan Abyan =

Association football club in Yemen

Hassan
- Full name: Hassan Abyan
- Ground: Al-Shohada'a Stadium; Abyan, Yemen
- Capacity: 20,000
- League: Yemeni League
- 2009/10: 1st (Group 1), (promoted)
Home colours	Away colours

Hassan Abyan (Arabic: حسان أبين) is a Yemeni football team currently playing in the Yemeni League, where they finished in 2nd place in the 2007 competition. It is based in Abyan. Their home stadium is Al-Shohada'a Stadium.

== History ==
The Hassan Sports Club's origins draw back to the establishment of the "Youth Sports Club" on 1 February 1949 by Salim Rubaya Ali, the future President of South Yemen. Asides from football, the club also participated in volleyball, handball, tennis, chess, cycling, bodybuilding, and karate. The Fadhli Sultanate, which ruled over Abyan at the time, banned the club on 1 April 1963 on the pretext that it was engaging in political activities. The ban was lifted on 2 October 1963, and the club was allowed to operate again under a new name, al-Ahli Sports Club. In 1976, under the People's Democratic Republic of Yemen, the al-Ahli Sports Club merged with other local clubs in al-Kawd, Musaymir, and Shuqrah, to form the Hassan Sports Club.

== See also ==
- List of football clubs in Yemen
