= Al Ittihad SCC (Ibb) =

Association football club in Yemen

Al-Ittihad Club
- Full name: Al-Ittihad Sports & Cultural Club
- Founded: 1967; 59 years ago
- Ground: 22 May Stadium; Ibb, Yemen
- Capacity: 40,000
- League: Yemeni League

Al-Ittihad Sports & Cultural Club (Arabic: نادي الإتحاد الرياضي ثقافي) is a Yemeni professional football club based in the city of Ibb.

== Achievements ==
- Yemeni League:

- Yemeni President Cup: 1

1998

== Performance in AFC competitions ==
- Asian Cup Winners Cup: 1 appearance

1999–2000: First round

== See also ==
- List of football clubs in Yemen
