= Al-Shaab Sanaa =

Association football club in Yemen

- Ground: Al-Shaab Sanaa Stadium
- Capacity: 5,000

Al-Shaab Sanaa is a football club playing in Yemen. Al-Shaab Sanaa Stadium is their home, it has a capacity of 5,000.

== Managerial history ==
Last update: 21 February 2014.

- (Yemen) Mohammed Banaja (20??–2014)
- (Egypt) Mustafa Hassan (2014–??)

== See also ==
- List of football clubs in Yemen
