= Al-Shaab Hadramaut =

Football Club in Yemen

Al-Sha'ab Hadhramaut
- Full name: Al-Sha'ab Hadhramaut Club
- Founded: 1972; 54 years ago
- Ground: Baradem Mukalla Stadium; Mukalla, Yemen
- Capacity: 15,000
- League: Yemeni League

Al-Sha'ab Hadhramaut Club (Arabic: نادي شعب حضرموت) is a Yemeni professional football club playing at the top national level. It is based in Mukalla. Their home stadium is Baradem Mukalla Stadium. It is one of the highest ranking teams in Yemen, winning 2 President Cups and a Yemeni Super Cup. In 2020, Al-Sha'ab Hadhramaut were crowned football champions of Yemen for the first time in their history.

== The Hadhramaut Cup ==
In 2017, the Hadhramaut Cup final between Al-Sha'ab Hadhramaut and Salam Al-Ghurfah took place in front of thousands of spectators. It was one of the main football games in Yemen that year.

In 2023, the Seiyun Olympic Stadium in Seiyun hosted a Hadramaut Cup final between Al-Sha'ab Hadhramaut and Itifaq Al-Houta. The final took place in front of a crowd of 50,000.

== Achievements ==
- Yemeni League: 1

2020

- Yemeni President Cup: 2

2000, 2006

- Yemeni Super Cup: 1

2013

== Performance in AFC competitions ==
- AFC Cup: 1 appearance

2008: Group stage

- AFC Cup Winners Cup: 1 appearance

2001–02: First round

== See also ==
- List of football clubs in Yemen
