= Al-Shula =

Association football club in Yemen

- Full name: Al-Shula
- Founded: February 13, 1968; 57 years ago
- Ground: Aden, Yemen
- League: Yemeni League

Al-Shula (Arabic: الشعلة) is a football club playing in Aden, Yemen.

== Achievements ==
- South Yemeni League

1989/90

== See also ==
- List of football clubs in Yemen
