= Althawra Sports City Stadium =

Sports venue in Sanaa, Yemen

Al-Thawra Sports City Stadium
- Interactive map of Al-Thawra Sports City Stadium
- Full name: Al-Thawra Sports City Stadium
- Location: Al-Thawra Street, Sanaa, Yemen
- Coordinates: 15°24′43.13″N 44°12′5.65″E
- Capacity: 30,000 (before bombings)
- Surface: Grass

Construction
- Opened: 1986

Tenant
- Yemen national football team

Al-Thawra Sports City Stadium (Arabic: مدينة الثورة الرياضية), also known as the Ali Mohsen al-Muraisi Stadium (Arabic: ملعب علي محسن المريسي), is a multi-purpose stadium in Sanaa, Yemen. It is currently used mostly for football matches. The stadium had a capacity of 30,000 people before bombings and it opened in 1986. It is currently the home ground of the Yemen national football team.

During the Saudi Arabian-led intervention in Yemen at the Yemen War, the stadium was destroyed by a Saudi Arabian air strike. In 2016, the stadium suffered bomb damage again.
