= Al-Wehda SCC (Sanaa) =

Association football club in Yemen

Al-Wehda Club
- Full name: Al-Wehda Sports & Cultural Club نادي الوحدة الرياضي و الثقافي
- Nicknames: The Falcons الصقور الزعيم
- Ground: Ali Muhesen Stadium; Sana'a, Yemen
- Capacity: 25,000
- League: Yemeni League

Al-Wehda Sports & Cultural Club (Arabic: نادي الوحدة الرياضي و الثقافي صنعاء) is a Yemeni professional football club based in Sana'a. Founded in 1954 as Al-Wahda, it has won the Yemeni League four times since 1990. Al-Wehda has a fierce rivalry with Al-Ahli Club Sana'a.

== Honours ==
- Yemeni League: 1 (before 1990)

1978/79

- Yemeni League: 4 (since 1990)

1994/95, 1996/97, 1997/98, 2001/02

- Prince Nassem's Cup: 2

== Performance in AFC competitions ==
- AFC Champions League: 4 appearances

1998, 1999, 2000, 2004

== See also ==
- List of football clubs in Yemen
