= Al Hilal Al Sahili =

Association football club in Yemen

Al Hilal
- Full name: Al-Hilal Al-Sahili
- Founded: 1971; 55 years ago
- Ground: Al Ulufi Stadium; Al Hudaydah, Yemen
- Capacity: 10,000
- League: Yemeni League

Al-Hilal Al-Sahili (Arabic: الهلال الساحلي) is a Yemeni professional football club based in Al Hudaydah. The club was founded in 1971.

== Achievements ==
- Yemeni League
  - Champions (2): 2008, 2009
- Yemeni President Cup
  - Champions (2): 2005, 2008
- Yemeni September 26 Cup
  - Champions (1): 2003

== Performance in AFC competitions ==
- AFC Cup: 3 appearances

2007: Group stage
2009: Group stage
2010: Group stage

== Managerial history ==
Last update: 21 February 2014

- (Yemen) Sami Al Nash (2010)
- (Sudan) Mehdi Mahdawi (2010–14)
- (Yemen) Sami Al Nash (2014)

== See also ==
- List of football clubs in Yemen
