= Al-Saqr SC =

Association football club in Yemen

Al Saqr SC
- Full name: Al Saqr Sport Club
- Founded: 1969; 56 years ago
- Ground: Abu Walad Stadium
- Capacity: 5,000
- League: Yemeni League

Al Saqr Sport & Cultural Club (Arabic: نادي الصقر الرياضي الثقافي) is a Yemeni professional football club based in Taiz. Saqr means "Falcons" in English. The club was founded in 1969.

== Achievements ==
- Yemeni League
  - Champions (3): 2006, 2010, 2014
- Yemeni Unity Cup
  - Winners (2): 2008, 2010

== Seasons ==
Season	Yemeni League	Yemeni Cup	Yemeni Unity Cup	Yemeni Super Cup	Yemeni League - Div 2
91-1990	7th – Group 2	Not held	Not held	Not held	Not held
92-1991	Played in Div 2	Not held	Not held	Not held	Not Known ?
94-1993	Played in Div 2	Not held	Not held	Not held	Not Known ?
95-1994	Played in Div 2	Not held	Not held	Not held	Not Known ?
96-1995	Not held	Not Known ?	Not held	Not held	Not held
97-1996	Played in Div 2	Not held	Not held	Not held	Not Known ?
98-1997	Played in Div 2	Not Known ?	Not held	Not held	CHAMPION
99-1998	9th	Not held	Not held	Not held	Played in Div 1
00-1999	3rd – Group 2	Quarter-finals	Not held	Not held	Played in Div 1
01-2000	7th	Not Known ?	Not held	Not held	Played in Div 1
02-2001	9th	Not Known ?	Not held	Not held	Played in Div 1
03-2002	7th	First round	Not held	Not held	Played in Div 1
04-2003	8th	Round of 16	Not held	Not held	Played in Div 1
05-2004	Runner-up	Quarter-finals	Not held	Not held	Played in Div 1
06-2005	CHAMPION	Round of 16	Not held	Not held	Played in Div 1
07-2006	3rd	Quarter-finals	Runner-up	Did not participate	Played in Div 1
08-2007	4th	Round of 16	CHAMPION	Did not participate	Played in Div 1
09-2008	3rd	Semi-finals	Round of 32	Did not participate	Played in Div 1
10-2009	CHAMPION	Round of 16	CHAMPION	CHAMPION	Played in Div 1
11-2010	Withdrew from League, Relegated to Div 2	Not held	Cancelled	Did not participate	Played in Div 1
12-2011	Played in Div 2	Round of 32	Not held	Did not participate	CHAMPION
13-2012	3rd	Not held	Not held	Did not participate	Played in Div 1
14-2013	CHAMPION		Not held		Played in Div 1

== Performance in AFC competitions ==
- AFC Cup: 2 appearances

2007: Group stage
2011: Group stage

== See also ==
- List of football clubs in Yemen
