= Shaab Ibb SCC =

Association football club in Yemen

Shaab Ibb
- Full name: Al-Sha'ab Ibb Sports and Cultural Club
- Founded: 1964; 62 years ago
- Ground: 22 May Stadium; Ibb, Yemen
- Capacity: 40,000
- Manager: Ahmed Ali Kassem
- League: Yemeni League
Home colours	Away colours

Al-Sha'ab Ibb Sports and Cultural Club (Arabic: نادي شعب إب الرياضي الثقافي) is a Yemeni professional football club based in Ibb. The club was established in 1964.

== Achievements ==
- Yemeni League: 3

2003, 2004, 2012.

- Yemeni President Cup: 2

2002, 2003.

- Yemeni September 26 Cup: 1

2002.

- Yemeni Super Cup: 1
  - 2013

== Performance in AFC competitions ==
- AFC Cup: 2 appearances

2004: Group stage
2013: Group stage

== See also ==
- List of football clubs in Yemen
