= Al-Tilal SC =

Sports club in Yemen

- Full name: Al-Tilal Sports Club
- Founded: 1905; 121 years ago (as the Yousef Muhammad Khan Stadium in 1903, later renamed to Al-Ittihad Al-Muhammadi Club in 1905)
- Ground: 22 May Stadium, Aden, Yemen
- Capacity: 8,000
- Manager: Fadel Al Raee
- League: Yemeni League
- 2013–14: 3rd
- Website: www.altilalclub.com
Home colours

Al-Tilal Sports Club (Arabic: نادي التلال) is a Yemeni multi-sports club based in Aden, Yemen. The club was founded in 1905, making it the oldest football club in the Arabian Peninsula and one of the oldest in the Middle East. Al-Tilal Sports Club is a Yemeni football team that plays in the Yemeni League, the country's top football league.

== History ==
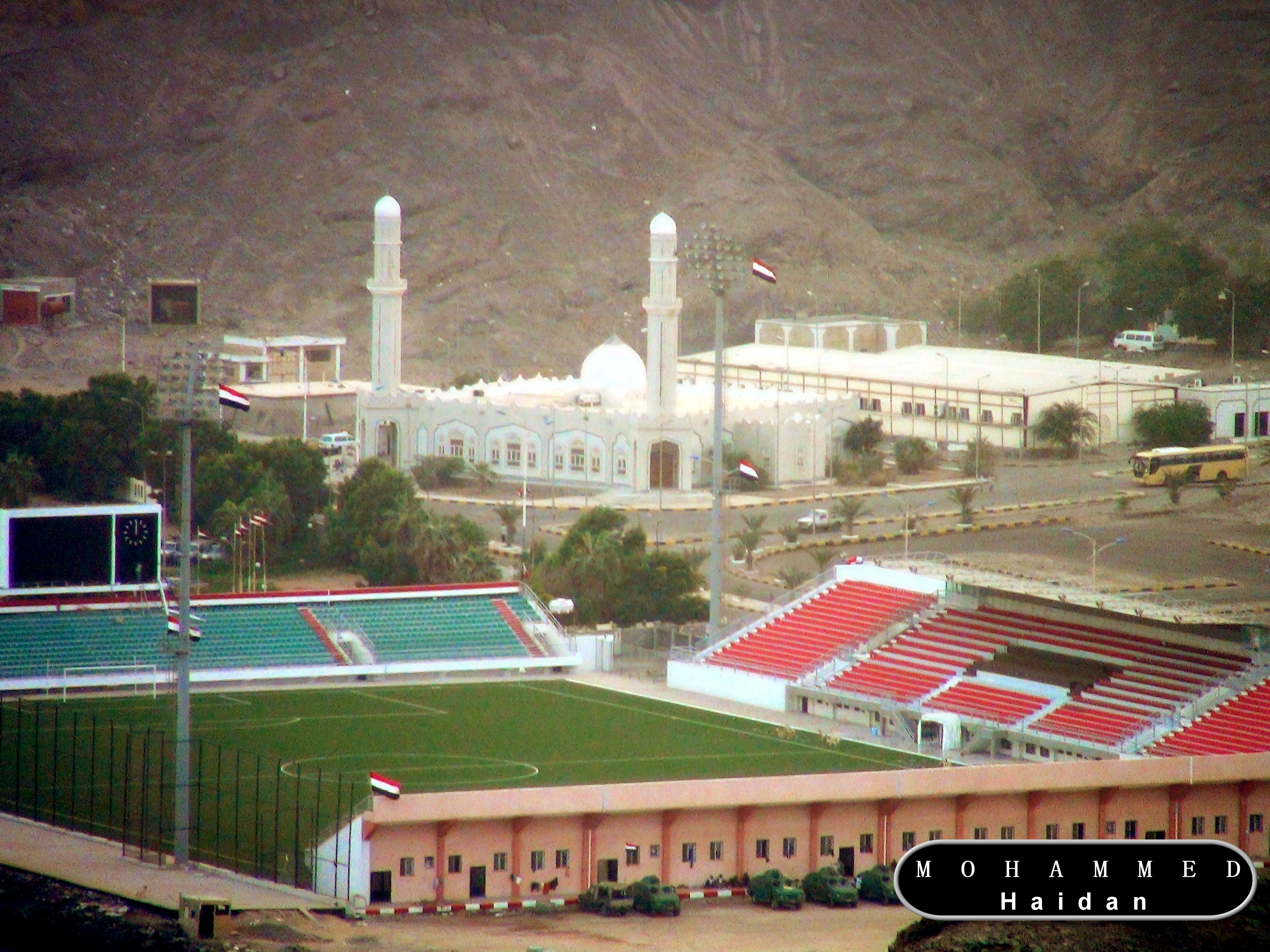
Al-Tilal Stadium, club's secondary venue

Al-Tilal SC was founded in 1905 under the name "Al-Ittihad al-Mohammadi". Al-Tilal SC is the oldest football team in the Arabian peninsula. The team has won the league title on two occasions and six national cups tournaments.

== Achievements ==
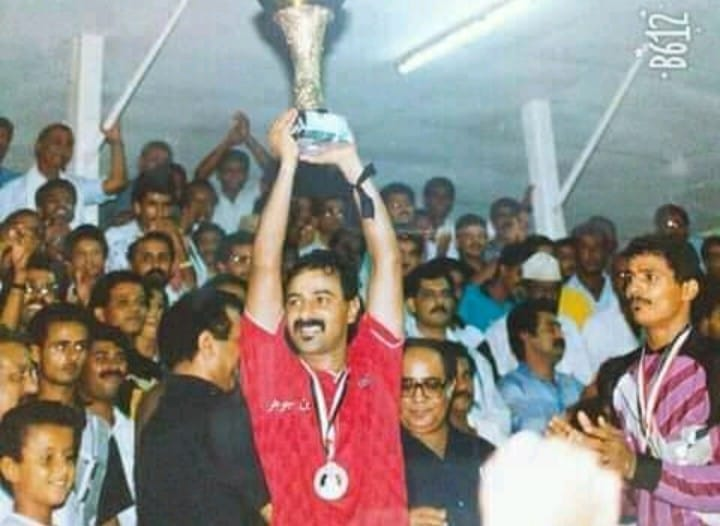
Al-Tilal winning the 98-90 South Yemeni League

- South Yemeni League: 5
  - 1970–71, 1979–80, 1981–82, 1982–83, 1986–87
- Yemeni League: 2
  - 1991, 2005
- Yemeni Presidents Cup: 2
  - 2007, 2010
- Yemeni Naseem Cup: 2
  - 2000, 2003
- Yemeni Unity Cup: 1
  - 1999
- Ali Muhsin al-Murisi Cup: 1
  - 2003

== Performance in AFC competitions ==
- AFC Cup: 3 appearances

2009: Group stage
2011: Group stage
2012: Group stage

- Asian Club Championship: 1 appearance

1992: Qualifying – second round

- Asian Cup Winners Cup: 1 appearance

1994–95: Withdrew

== See also ==
- List of football clubs in Yemen
