= Ahli Sanaa Club =

Sports club in Yemen

Ahli Sana'a
- Full name: Ahli Sana'a Club
- Founded: 1952; 74 years ago
- Ground: Ali Muhesen Stadium; Sanaa, Yemen
- Capacity: 25,000
- League: Yemeni League

Ahli Sana'a Club (Arabic: نادي أهلي صنعاء) is a Yemeni football club based in Sanaa, Yemen. The club was founded in 1952. Ahli Sana'a Club usually played league games in front of hundreds of spectators before the Yemeni civil war broke out in late 2014.

== Overview ==
Ahli Sana'a Club has a rivalry with Al-Wehda, which manifests itself in the Al-Wahda versus Ahli Sana'a Club matches, known as "the Summit".

== Achievements ==
- Yemeni League: 11
  - 1981, 1983, 1984, 1988, 1992, 1994, 1999, 2000, 2001, 2007, 2023–24
- Yemeni President Cup: 3
  - 2001, 2004, 2009
- Yemeni Unity Cup: 1
  - 2004
- Yemeni Esteghlal Cup: 1
  - 2006

== Performance in AFC competitions ==
- AFC Champions League: 1 appearance

2002–03: Qualifying West – Third round

- Asian Club Championship: 3 appearances

1990: Qualifying stage
1994: Qualifying – First round
2001: First round

- AFC Cup: 2 appearances

2008: Group stage
2010: Group stage

- Asian Cup Winners Cup: 2 appearances

1991–92: Second round
1998–99: First round

== See also ==
- List of football clubs in Yemen
