= 24th Arabian Gulf Cup squads =

Below were the squads for the 24th Arabian Gulf Cup in Qatar in 2019.

== Group A ==
=== Qatar ===
Coach: (Spain) Félix Sánchez

| No. | Pos. | Player | Date of birth (age) | Caps | Goals | Club |
|---|---|---|---|---|---|---|
| 1 | GK | Saad Al-Sheeb | 19 February 1990 (aged 29) | 65 | 0 | (Qatar Football Association) Al-Sadd |
| 2 | DF | Ró-Ró | 6 August 1990 (aged 29) | 56 | 1 | (Qatar Football Association) Al-Sadd |
| 3 | DF | Abdelkarim Hassan | 28 August 1993 (aged 26) | 96 | 14 | (Qatar Football Association) Al-Sadd |
| 4 | DF | Al-Mahdi Ali Mukhtar | 2 March 1992 (aged 27) | 36 | 3 | (Qatar Football Association) Al-Gharafa |
| 5 | DF | Tarek Salman | 5 December 1997 (aged 21) | 31 | 0 | (Qatar Football Association) Al-Sadd |
| 6 | MF | Abdulaziz Hatem | 28 October 1990 (aged 29) | 69 | 4 | (Qatar Football Association) Al-Rayyan |
| 7 | FW | Mohammed Muntari | 20 December 1993 (aged 25) | 27 | 8 | (Qatar Football Association) Al-Duhail SC |
| 8 | MF | Ahmed Fatehi | 25 January 1993 (aged 26) | 11 | 0 | (Qatar Football Association) Al-Arabi |
| 9 | FW | Mohammed Salah Al-Neel | 20 April 1991 (aged 28) | 2 | 0 | (Qatar Football Association) Al-Arabi SC |
| 10 | FW | Hassan Al-Haydos (captain) | 11 December 1990 (aged 28) | 131 | 27 | (Qatar Football Association) Al-Sadd |
| 11 | FW | Akram Afif | 18 November 1996 (aged 23) | 58 | 17 | (Qatar Football Association) Al-Sadd |
| 12 | MF | Karim Boudiaf | 16 September 1990 (aged 29) | 85 | 5 | (Qatar Football Association) Al-Duhail |
| 13 | DF | Musab Kheder | 1 January 1993 (aged 26) | 14 | 0 | (Qatar Football Association) Al-Arabi |
| 14 | MF | Salem Al-Hajri | 10 April 1996 (aged 23) | 19 | 0 | (Qatar Football Association) Al-Sadd |
| 15 | DF | Bassam Al-Rawi | 16 December 1997 (aged 21) | 27 | 2 | (Qatar Football Association) Al-Duhail |
| 16 | DF | Boualem Khoukhi | 9 July 1990 (aged 29) | 76 | 19 | (Qatar Football Association) Al-Sadd |
| 17 | FW | Ismaeel Mohammad | 5 April 1990 (aged 29) | 53 | 4 | (Qatar Football Association) Al-Duhail |
| 18 | FW | Yusuf Abdurisag | 6 August 1999 (aged 20) | 7 | 1 | (Qatar Football Association) Al-Arabi |
| 19 | FW | Almoez Ali | 19 August 1996 (aged 23) | 57 | 25 | (Qatar Football Association) Al-Duhail |
| 20 | MF | Abdullah Al-Ahrak | 10 May 1997 (aged 22) | 7 | 1 | (Qatar Football Association) Al-Ahli |
| 21 | GK | Fahad Younes | 30 July 1994 (aged 25) | 0 | 0 | (Qatar Football Association) Al Rayyan SC |
| 22 | GK | Mohammed Al-Bakri | 28 March 1997 (aged 22) | 3 | 0 | (Qatar Football Association) Al-Duhail |
| 23 | DF | Fahad Al-Abdulrahman | 6 April 1995 (aged 24) | 3 | 0 | (Qatar Football Association) Al-Arabi SC |

=== United Arab Emirates ===
Coach: (Netherlands) Bert van Marwijk

| No. | Pos. | Player | Date of birth (age) | Caps | Goals | Club |
|---|---|---|---|---|---|---|
| 1 | GK | Ali Khasif | 9 June 1987 (aged 32) | 45 | 0 | (United Arab Emirates Football Association) Al-Jazira |
| 2 | MF | Khalil Ibrahim | 4 May 1993 (aged 26) | 2 | 3 | (United Arab Emirates Football Association) Al-Wahda |
| 3 | DF | Mohammed Marzooq | 23 January 1989 (aged 30) | 0 | 0 | (United Arab Emirates Football Association) Shabab Al-Ahli |
| 4 | MF | Waleed Hussain | 27 May 1992 (aged 27) | 0 | 0 | (United Arab Emirates Football Association) Shabab Al-Ahli |
| 5 | DF | Mohammed Omar Al-Attas | 5 August 1997 (aged 22) | 1 | 1 | (United Arab Emirates Football Association) Al-Jazira |
| 6 | DF | Yousif Jaber | 25 February 1985 (aged 34) | 38 | 2 | (United Arab Emirates Football Association) Shabab Al-Ahli |
| 7 | MF | Abdullah Ramadan | 7 March 1998 (aged 21) | 0 | 0 | (United Arab Emirates Football Association) Al-Jazira |
| 8 | DF | Hamdan Al-Kamali | 2 May 1989 (aged 30) | 52 | 5 | (United Arab Emirates Football Association) Al-Wahda |
| 9 | MF | Bandar Al-Ahbabi | 9 July 1990 (aged 29) | 15 | 2 | (United Arab Emirates Football Association) Al-Ain |
| 10 | MF | Omar Abdulrahman (captain) | 20 September 1991 (aged 28) | 74 | 11 | (United Arab Emirates Football Association) Al-Jazira |
| 11 | FW | Ahmed Khalil | 8 June 1991 (aged 28) | 103 | 48 | (United Arab Emirates Football Association) Shabab Al-Ahli |
| 12 | DF | Khalifa Al Hammadi | 6 November 1998 (aged 21) | 0 | 0 | (United Arab Emirates Football Association) Al-Jazira |
| 13 | FW | Jassem Yaqoub | 16 March 1997 (aged 22) | 0 | 0 | (United Arab Emirates Football Association) Al-Nasr |
| 14 | FW | Zaid Al-Ameri | 14 January 1997 (aged 22) | 0 | 0 | (United Arab Emirates Football Association) Al-Jazira |
| 15 | MF | Ismail Al Hammadi | 1 July 1988 (aged 31) | 107 | 14 | (United Arab Emirates Football Association) Shabab Al-Ahli |
| 16 | DF | Al Hassan Saleh | 25 June 1991 (aged 28) | 5 | 0 | (United Arab Emirates Football Association) Sharjah |
| 17 | GK | Khalid Eisa | 15 September 1989 (aged 30) | 45 | 0 | (United Arab Emirates Football Association) Al-Ain |
| 18 | MF | Tareq Ahmed | 12 March 1988 (aged 31) | 6 | 1 | (United Arab Emirates Football Association) Al-Nasr |
| 19 | MF | Ahmed Barman | 5 February 1994 (aged 25) | 4 | 0 | (United Arab Emirates Football Association) Al-Ain |
| 20 | FW | Ali Saleh | 22 January 2000 (aged 19) | 0 | 0 | (United Arab Emirates Football Association) Al Wasl |
| 21 | FW | Khalfan Mubarak | 9 May 1995 (aged 24) | 12 | 1 | (United Arab Emirates Football Association) Al-Jazira |
| 22 | GK | Adel Al-Hosani | 23 August 1989 (aged 30) | 0 | 0 | (United Arab Emirates Football Association) Sharjah |
| 23 | MF | Salem Rashid | 21 December 1993 (aged 25) | 0 | 0 | (United Arab Emirates Football Association) Al-Jazira |
| 24 | GK | Mohammed Al-Shamsi | 4 January 1997 (aged 22) | 0 | 0 | (United Arab Emirates Football Association) Al-Wahda |
| 25 | FW | Ali Mabkhout | 5 October 1990 (aged 29) | 80 | 55 | (United Arab Emirates Football Association) Al-Jazira |
| 26 | DF | Majed Suroor | 14 October 1997 (aged 22) | 0 | 0 | (United Arab Emirates Football Association) Sharjah |
| 27 | DF | Shahin Abdulrahman | 16 November 1992 (aged 27) | 0 | 0 | (United Arab Emirates Football Association) Sharjah |

=== Yemen ===
Coach: (Yemen) Sami Hasan Al Nash

| No. | Pos. | Player | Date of birth (age) | Caps | Goals | Club |
|---|---|---|---|---|---|---|
| 1 | GK | Mohammed Ayash | 6 March 1986 (aged 33) | 33 | 0 | (Iraq Football Association) Peshmerga |
| 2 | DF | Rami Al-Wasmani | 1 February 1997 (aged 22) | 0 | 0 | (Yemen Football Association) Ahli Sana'a |
| 3 | DF | Mohammed Fuad Omar | 13 March 1989 (aged 30) | 44 | 4 | (Qatar Football Association) Muaither |
| 4 | DF | Mudir Abdurabu | 1 January 1993 (aged 26) | 30 | 1 | (Qatar Football Association) Al-Wakra |
| 5 | DF | Abdulaziz Al-Gumaei | 8 January 1990 (aged 29) | 20 | 0 | (Qatar Football Association) Mesaimeer |
| 6 | MF | Ahmed Abdulrab | 27 April 1994 (aged 25) | 10 | 0 | (Jordan Football Association) That Ras |
| 7 | MF | Ahmed Al-Sarori | 9 August 1998 (aged 21) | 18 | 2 | (Qatar Football Association) Al-Markhiya |
| 8 | MF | Wahid Al Khyat | 1 January 1986 (aged 33) | 29 | 0 | (Yemen Football Association) Ahli Sana'a |
| 9 | MF | Alaa Al-Sasi (captain) | 2 July 1987 (aged 32) | 63 | 8 | (Qatar Football Association) Al-Sailiya |
| 10 | MF | Ahmed Dhabaan | 9 July 1994 (aged 25) | 4 | 0 | (Qatar Football Association) Al-Shamal |
| 11 | MF | Abdulwasea Al-Matari | 4 July 1994 (aged 25) | 29 | 5 | (Oman Football Association) Al-Nahda |
| 12 | MF | Ahmed Al-Haifi | 1 January 1994 (aged 25) | 36 | 0 | (Qatar Football Association) Al Kharaitiyat |
| 13 | DF | Ala Addin Mahdi | 1 January 1996 (aged 23) | 13 | 0 | (Oman Football Association) Majees |
| 14 | FW | Ali Hafeedh | 21 February 1997 (aged 22) | 1 | 0 | (Yemen Football Association) Wehda Adan |
| 15 | DF | Ammar Hamsan | 5 November 1994 (aged 25) | 9 | 0 | (Qatar Football Association) Qatar |
| 16 | FW | Salem Al-Omzae | 1 January 1992 (aged 27) | 4 | 0 | (Yemen Football Association) Al-Tilal |
| 17 | MF | Hussein Al-Ghazi | 7 May 1990 (aged 29) | 35 | 0 | (Qatar Football Association) Al-Wakra |
| 18 | FW | Ahmed Alos | 3 April 1994 (aged 25) | 14 | 0 | (Yemen Football Association) Wehda Adan |
| 19 | DF | Mohammed Boqshan | 10 March 1994 (aged 25) | 38 | 1 | (Qatar Football Association) Al-Khor |
| 20 | FW | Emad Mansoor | 15 April 1992 (aged 27) | 13 | 1 | (Oman Football Association) Bidiyah |
| 21 | DF | Mohammed Ba Rowis | 4 December 1988 (aged 30) | 17 | 2 | (Yemen Football Association) Wehda Adan |
| 22 | GK | Salem Al-Harsh | 7 October 1998 (aged 21) | 1 | 0 | (Yemen Football Association) Wehda Adan |
| 23 | GK | Saoud Al-Sowadi | 10 April 1988 (aged 31) | 43 | 0 | (Yemen Football Association) Al-Saqr |

=== Iraq ===
Coach: (Slovenia) Srečko Katanec

| No. | Pos. | Player | Date of birth (age) | Caps | Goals | Club |
|---|---|---|---|---|---|---|
| 1 | GK | Fahad Talib | 21 October 1994 (aged 25) | 3 | 0 | (Iraq Football Association) Al-Zawraa |
| 2 | DF | Ahmad Ibrahim | 25 February 1992 (aged 27) | 96 | 4 | (Iraq Football Association) Al-Quwa Al-Jawiya |
| 3 | DF | Mustafa Mohammed | 14 January 1998 (aged 21) | 7 | 0 | (Iraq Football Association) Al-Zawraa |
| 4 | DF | Saad Natiq | 19 March 1994 (aged 25) | 25 | 0 | (Iraq Football Association) Al-Shorta |
| 5 | DF | Ali Faez | 9 September 1994 (aged 25) | 25 | 3 | (Iraq Football Association) Al-Shorta |
| 6 | DF | Ali Adnan | 19 September 1993 (aged 26) | 70 | 5 | (Canadian Soccer Association) Vancouver Whitecaps |
| 7 | MF | Safaa Hadi | 14 October 1998 (aged 21) | 23 | 0 | (Iraq Football Association) Al-Shorta |
| 8 | MF | Ibrahim Bayesh | 1 May 2000 (aged 19) | 9 | 2 | (Iraq Football Association) Al-Quwa Al-Jawiya |
| 9 | FW | Alaa Abbas | 27 July 1997 (aged 22) | 16 | 2 | (Iraq Football Association) Al-Zawraa |
| 10 | FW | Alaa Abdul-Zahra (captain) | 22 December 1987 (aged 31) | 116 | 15 | (Iraq Football Association) Al-Shorta |
| 12 | GK | Jalal Hassan | 18 May 1991 (aged 28) | 50 | 0 | (Iraq Football Association) Al-Zawraa |
| 14 | MF | Amjad Attwan | 12 March 1997 (aged 22) | 44 | 1 | (Iraq Football Association) Al-Shorta |
| 15 | DF | Dhurgham Ismail | 24 May 1994 (aged 25) | 51 | 3 | (Iraq Football Association) Al-Shorta |
| 16 | MF | Mohammed Ridha Jalil | 17 February 2000 (aged 19) | 0 | 0 | (Iraq Football Association) Al-Zawraa |
| 17 | DF | Alaa Mhawi | 3 June 1996 (aged 23) | 36 | 0 | (Iraq Football Association) Al-Shorta |
| 18 | FW | Mohanad Ali | 20 June 2000 (aged 19) | 24 | 13 | (Qatar Football Association) Al-Duhail |
| 19 | MF | Mohammed Qasim | 6 December 1996 (aged 22) | 4 | 0 | (Iraq Football Association) Al-Quwa Al-Jawiya |
| 20 | GK | Mohammed Hameed | 24 January 1993 (aged 26) | 33 | 0 | (Iraq Football Association) Al-Shorta |
| 21 | MF | Hassan Hamoud | | 0 | 0 | (Iraq Football Association) Naft Maysan |
| 22 | MF | Sharif Abdul-Kadhim | 7 June 1996 (aged 23) | 0 | 0 | (Iraq Football Association) Al-Quwa Al-Jawiya |
| 23 | DF | Maitham Jabbar | 10 November 2000 (aged 19) | 4 | 0 | (Iraq Football Association) Al-Quwa Al-Jawiya |

== Group B ==
=== Oman ===
Coach: (Netherlands) Erwin Koeman

| No. | Pos. | Player | Date of birth (age) | Caps | Goals | Club |
|---|---|---|---|---|---|---|
| 1 | GK | Ammar Al-Rushaidi | 14 February 1998 (aged 21) | 1 | 0 | (Oman Football Association) Al-Suwaiq |
| 2 | DF | Mohammed Al-Musalami | 27 April 1990 (aged 29) | 83 | 2 | (Oman Football Association) Dhofar |
| 3 | DF | Mohammed Al-Rawahi | 26 April 1993 (aged 26) | 13 | 0 | (Qatar Football Association) Al-Wakra |
| 4 | MF | Ali Al-Jabri | 29 January 1990 (aged 29) | 51 | 0 | (Oman Football Association) Al-Nahda |
| 5 | DF | Mohammed Al-Balushi | 27 August 1989 (aged 30) | 63 | 1 | (Oman Football Association) Al-Nahda |
| 6 | MF | Raed Ibrahim Saleh | 9 June 1992 (aged 27) | 87 | 5 | (Malta Football Association) Valletta |
| 7 | FW | Khalid Al-Hajri | 10 March 1994 (aged 25) | 23 | 11 | (Oman Football Association) Al-Nasr |
| 8 | MF | Yaseen Al-Sheyadi | 5 February 1994 (aged 25) | 21 | 0 | (Oman Football Association) Al-Suwaiq |
| 9 | FW | Mohammed Al-Ghassani | 1 April 1985 (aged 34) | 23 | 3 | (Oman Football Association) Saham |
| 10 | MF | Mohsin Al-Khaldi (captain) | 1 January 1992 (aged 27) | 46 | 6 | (Oman Football Association) Sohar |
| 11 | DF | Saad Al-Mukhaini | 6 September 1987 (aged 32) | 107 | 1 | (Saudi Arabian Football Federation) Al-Nassr |
| 12 | MF | Ahmed Mubarak Al-Mahaijri | 23 February 1985 (aged 34) | 176 | 23 | (Qatar Football Association) Al-Mesaimeer |
| 13 | DF | Khalid Al-Buraiki | 3 July 1993 (aged 26) | 10 | 0 | (Oman Football Association) Al-Nasr |
| 15 | MF | Jameel Al-Yahmadi | 9 October 1994 (aged 25) | 28 | 2 | (Qatar Football Association) Al-Wakra |
| 16 | FW | Muhsen Al-Ghassani | 27 March 1997 (aged 22) | 14 | 2 | (Oman Football Association) Al-Suwaiq |
| 17 | DF | Ali Al-Busaidi | 21 January 1991 (aged 28) | 56 | 1 | (Oman Football Association) Dhofar |
| 18 | GK | Faiz Al-Rushaidi | 19 July 1988 (aged 31) | 39 | 0 | (Saudi Arabian Football Federation) Al-Ain |
| 21 | MF | Moataz Saleh | 28 May 1996 (aged 23) | 6 | 1 | (Oman Football Association) Dhofar |
| 22 | GK | Ahmed Al-Rawahi | 5 May 1994 (aged 25) | 3 | 0 | (Oman Football Association) Al-Nasr |
| 23 | MF | Harib Al-Saadi | 1 February 1990 (aged 29) | 29 | 0 | (Oman Football Association) Dhofar |
| 25 | MF | Salah Al-Yahyai | 4 January 1994 (aged 25) | 12 | 3 | (Oman Football Association) Dhofar |
| 31 | MF | Mahmood Al-Mushaifri | 14 January 1993 (aged 26) | 21 | 0 | (Oman Football Association) Al-Nasr |
| 34 | FW | Mohamed Khasib | 24 March 1994 (aged 25) | 12 | 0 | (Oman Football Association) Al-Nahda |

=== Saudi Arabia ===
Coach: (France) Herve Renard

| No. | Pos. | Player | Date of birth (age) | Caps | Goals | Club |
|---|---|---|---|---|---|---|
| 1 | GK | Amin Bukhari | 2 May 1997 (aged 22) | 0 | 0 | (Saudi Arabian Football Federation) Al-Ittihad |
| 2 | DF | Saud Abdulhamid | 18 July 1999 (aged 20) | 2 | 0 | (Saudi Arabian Football Federation) Al-Ittihad |
| 3 | DF | Hassan Tambakti | 9 February 1999 (aged 20) | 2 | 0 | (Saudi Arabian Football Federation) Al-Wehda |
| 4 | DF | Ziyad Al-Sahafi | 17 October 1994 (aged 25) | 5 | 0 | (Saudi Arabian Football Federation) Al-Ittihad |
| 5 | DF | Mohammed Al-Khabrani | 14 October 1993 (aged 26) | 9 | 1 | (Saudi Arabian Football Federation) Al-Ahli |
| 6 | DF | Talal Al-Absi | 22 February 1993 (aged 26) | 1 | 0 | (Saudi Arabian Football Federation) Al-Taawoun |
| 7 | MF | Salman Al-Faraj (captain) | 1 August 1989 (aged 30) | 53 | 6 | (Saudi Arabian Football Federation) Al-Hilal |
| 8 | MF | Yahya Al-Shehri | 26 June 1990 (aged 29) | 74 | 8 | (Saudi Arabian Football Federation) Al-Nassr |
| 9 | FW | Abdullah Al-Hamdan | 12 September 1999 (aged 20) | 6 | 1 | (Saudi Arabian Football Federation) Al-Shabab |
| 10 | MF | Nawaf Al Abed | 26 January 1990 (aged 29) | 45 | 8 | (Saudi Arabian Football Federation) Al-Hilal |
| 11 | MF | Hattan Bahebri | 16 July 1992 (aged 27) | 24 | 2 | (Saudi Arabian Football Federation) Al-Hilal |
| 12 | MF | Abdulellah Al-Malki | 11 October 1994 (aged 25) | 3 | 0 | (Saudi Arabian Football Federation) Al-Ittihad |
| 13 | DF | Yasser Al-Shahrani | 25 May 1992 (aged 27) | 53 | 0 | (Saudi Arabian Football Federation) Al-Hilal |
| 14 | MF | Abdullah Otayf | 3 August 1992 (aged 27) | 33 | 1 | (Saudi Arabian Football Federation) Al-Hilal |
| 15 | MF | Abdulfattah Asiri | 26 February 1994 (aged 25) | 16 | 2 | (Saudi Arabian Football Federation) Al-Ahli |
| 16 | DF | Sultan Al-Ghanam | 6 May 1994 (aged 25) | 2 | 0 | (Saudi Arabian Football Federation) Al-Nassr |
| 17 | FW | Firas Al-Buraikan | 14 May 2000 (aged 19) | 4 | 0 | (Saudi Arabian Football Federation) Al-Nassr |
| 18 | MF | Salem Al-Dawsari | 19 August 1991 (aged 28) | 48 | 11 | (Saudi Arabian Football Federation) Al-Hilal |
| 19 | MF | Turki Al-Ammar | 24 September 1999 (aged 20) | 1 | 0 | (Saudi Arabian Football Federation) Al-Shabab |
| 20 | MF | Abdulaziz Al-Bishi | 11 March 1994 (aged 25) | 13 | 1 | (Saudi Arabian Football Federation) Al-Ittihad |
| 21 | GK | Mohammed Al-Rubeai | 14 August 1997 (aged 22) | 0 | 0 | (Saudi Arabian Football Federation) Al-Ahli |
| 22 | GK | Fawaz Al-Qarni | 2 April 1992 (aged 27) | 4 | 0 | (Saudi Arabian Football Federation) Al-Ittihad |
| 23 | MF | Mohamed Kanno | 22 September 1994 (aged 25) | 10 | 1 | (Saudi Arabian Football Federation) Al-Hilal |

=== Kuwait ===
Coach: (Kuwait) Thamer Enad

| No. | Pos. | Player | Date of birth (age) | Caps | Goals | Club |
|---|---|---|---|---|---|---|
| 1 | GK | Hameed Al-Qallaf | 10 August 1987 (aged 32) | 35 | 0 | (Kuwait Football Association) Kuwait SC |
| 2 | DF | Sami Al-Sanea | 9 January 1993 (aged 26) | 3 | 1 | (Kuwait Football Association) Kuwait SC |
| 3 | MF | Ahmed Al-Dhefiri | 8 February 1992 (aged 27) | 9 | 0 | (Kuwait Football Association) Qadsia SC |
| 4 | DF | Meshari Ghanam | 28 August 1997 (aged 22) | 1 | 0 | (Kuwait Football Association) Kuwait SC |
| 5 | DF | Fahed Al Hajri | 10 November 1991 (aged 28) | 32 | 3 | (Kuwait Football Association) Kuwait SC |
| 6 | MF | Sultan Al Enezi | 13 September 1992 (aged 27) | 26 | 0 | (Qatar Football Association) Al-Wakrah |
| 7 | MF | Faisal Zaid | 9 October 1991 (aged 28) | 25 | 2 | (Kuwait Football Association) Jahra |
| 8 | MF | Abdullah Al Buraiki | 12 August 1987 (aged 32) | 32 | 3 | (Kuwait Football Association) Kuwait SC |
| 9 | FW | Faisal Ajab | 23 January 1993 (aged 26) | 10 | 0 | (Kuwait Football Association) Al-Tadhamon |
| 10 | MF | Talal Al Fadhel | 11 August 1990 (aged 29) | 6 | 0 | (Kuwait Football Association) Kuwait SC |
| 11 | MF | Fahad Al Ansari | 25 February 1987 (aged 32) | 53 | 2 | (Saudi Arabian Football Federation) Al-Faisaly FC |
| 12 | MF | Hamad Harbi | 25 July 1992 (aged 27) | 0 | 0 | (Kuwait Football Association) Kazma |
| 13 | DF | Fahad Humood Al-Rashidi | 3 October 1990 (aged 29) | 5 | 0 | (Kuwait Football Association) Kuwait SC |
| 14 | MF | Redha Hani | 27 October 1996 (aged 23) | 7 | 0 | (Kuwait Football Association) Al-Qadsia |
| 15 | MF | Ahmad Zanki | 17 December 1995 (aged 23) | 3 | 0 | (Kuwait Football Association) Al-Shabab |
| 16 | MF | Mubarak Al-Faneni | 21 January 2000 (aged 19) | 0 | 0 | (Kuwait Football Association) Al-Salmiya |
| 17 | FW | Bader Al Mutawa | 10 January 1985 (aged 34) | 175 | 56 | (Kuwait Football Association) Qadsia SC |
| 18 | DF | Amer Al-Fadhel | 21 April 1988 (aged 31) | 66 | 0 | (Kuwait Football Association) Qadsia SC |
| 19 | MF | Shabaib Al-Khaldi | 11 August 1998 (aged 21) | 1 | 1 | (Kuwait Football Association) Kazma |
| 20 | FW | Yousef Nasser | 9 October 1990 (aged 29) | 90 | 41 | (Kuwait Football Association) Al-Qadsia |
| 21 | DF | Dhari Said | 2 May 1987 (aged 32) | 9 | 0 | (Kuwait Football Association) Qadsia SC |
| 22 | GK | Sulaiman Abdulghafour | 26 February 1991 (aged 28) | 19 | 0 | (Kuwait Football Association) Al-Arabi |
| 23 | GK | Hussain Kankone | 16 April 1989 (aged 30) | 1 | 0 | (Kuwait Football Association) Kazma |

=== Bahrain ===
Coach: (Portugal) Hélio Sousa

| No. | Pos. | Player | Date of birth (age) | Caps | Goals | Club |
|---|---|---|---|---|---|---|
| 1 | GK | Sayed Shubbar Alawi | 11 August 1985 (aged 34) | 19 | 0 | (Bahrain Football Association) Al-Riffa |
| 2 | DF | Sayed Baqer | 14 April 1994 (aged 25) | 10 | 0 | (Bahrain Football Association) Al-Riffa |
| 3 | DF | Waleed Al Hayam | 3 February 1991 (aged 28) | 60 | 0 | (Bahrain Football Association) Al-Muharraq |
| 4 | MF | Sayed Dhiya Saeed | 17 July 1992 (aged 27) | 78 | 3 | (Kuwait Football Association) Al-Nasr |
| 5 | DF | Ahmed Bughammar | 30 December 1997 (aged 21) | 1 | 0 | (Bahrain Football Association) Al-Hidd |
| 6 | MF | Mohammed Al-Hardan | 6 October 1997 (aged 22) | 1 | 0 | (Danish Football Association) Vejle Boldklub |
| 7 | MF | Mohamed Abdulwahab | 13 November 1989 (aged 30) | 0 | 0 | (Bahrain Football Association) Al-Hidd |
| 8 | MF | Ali Madan | 30 November 1995 (aged 23) | 27 | 4 | (Bahrain Football Association) Al-Najma |
| 9 | FW | Thiago Augusto | 20 May 1990 (aged 29) | 0 | 0 | (Bahrain Football Association) Al-Muharraq |
| 10 | MF | Abdulwahab Al-Malood | 7 June 1990 (aged 29) | 43 | 4 | (Bahrain Football Association) Al-Hidd |
| 11 | DF | Mohamed Adel | 20 September 1996 (aged 23) | 7 | 0 | (Bahrain Football Association) Manama |
| 12 | MF | Mohamed Marhoon | 12 February 1998 (aged 21) | 7 | 2 | (Bahrain Football Association) Al-Riffa |
| 13 | FW | Mohamed Al-Romaihi | 9 September 1990 (aged 29) | 16 | 6 | (Bahrain Football Association) Manama |
| 14 | MF | Ali Haram | 11 December 1988 (aged 30) | 4 | 0 | (Bahrain Football Association) Al-Riffa |
| 15 | MF | Jasim Al-Shaikh | 1 February 1996 (aged 23) | 9 | 0 | (Bahrain Football Association) Al-Ahli |
| 16 | DF | Sayed Redha Isa | 7 August 1994 (aged 25) | 13 | 0 | (Bahrain Football Association) Al-Riffa |
| 17 | DF | Abdulla Al-Haza'a | 19 July 1990 (aged 29) | 41 | 0 | (Bahrain Football Association) East Riffa |
| 18 | DF | Ahmed Nabeel | 25 August 1995 (aged 24) | 0 | 0 | (Bahrain Football Association) Manama |
| 19 | MF | Kamil Al Aswad | 8 April 1994 (aged 25) | 39 | 3 | (Bahrain Football Association) Al-Riffa |
| 20 | FW | Mahdi Al-Humaidan | 19 May 1993 (aged 26) | 6 | 0 | (Bahrain Football Association) Al-Ahli |
| 21 | GK | Sayed Mohammed Jaffer (captain) | 25 August 1985 (aged 34) | 115 | 0 | (Bahrain Football Association) Al-Muharraq |
| 22 | GK | Hamed Al-Doseri | 24 July 1989 (aged 30) | 7 | 0 | (Bahrain Football Association) Al-Hala |
| 23 | DF | Rashed Al-Hooti | 24 December 1989 (aged 29) | 30 | 0 | (Bahrain Football Association) Al-Riffa |
