= 2019 WAFF Championship squads =

The 2019 WAFF Championship was an international football tournament held in Iraq from 30 July to 14 August 2019. The nine national teams involved in the tournament were required to register a squad of 23 players, including three goalkeepers. Only players in these squads were eligible to take part in the tournament.

The age listed for each player is on 30 July 2019, the first day of the tournament. The numbers of caps and goals listed for each player do not include any matches played after the start of tournament. The club listed is the club for which the player last played a competitive match prior to the tournament. (Note: This is the club a player was last able to play for during the previous season in the event a player did not play a competitive match.) The nationality for each club reflects the national association (not the league) to which the club is affiliated. A flag is included for coaches who are of a different nationality than their own national team.

== Group A ==
=== Iraq ===
Coach: (Slovenia) Srečko Katanec

Iraq's 44-man preliminary squad was announced on 24 June 2019. The squad was reduced to 36 players on 12 July, then to 33 players on 20 July. The final squad was announced on 22 July.

No.	Pos.	Player	Date of birth (age)	Caps	Goals	Club
1	GK	Jalal Hassan (captain)	18 May 1991 (aged 28)	46	0	(Iraq Football Association) Al-Zawraa
2	DF	Ahmad Ibrahim	25 February 1992 (aged 27)	85	3	(Qatar Football Association) Al-Arabi
3	DF	Mustafa Mohammed	14 January 1998 (aged 21)	4	0	(Iraq Football Association) Al-Zawraa
4	DF	Saad Natiq	19 March 1994 (aged 25)	15	0	(Iraq Football Association) Al-Quwa Al-Jawiya
5	MF	Safaa Hadi	14 October 1998 (aged 20)	12	0	(Iraq Football Association) Al-Zawraa
6	DF	Sameh Saeed	26 May 1992 (aged 27)	14	0	(Iraq Football Association) Al-Quwa Al-Jawiya
7	MF	Ibrahim Bayesh	1 May 2000 (aged 19)	1	0	(Iraq Football Association) Al-Quwa Al-Jawiya
8	MF	Hussein Ali	29 November 1996 (aged 22)	26	1	(Iraq Football Association) Al-Zawraa
9	FW	Alaa Abbas	27 July 1997 (aged 22)	6	1	(Iraq Football Association) Al-Zawraa
10	FW	Mohannad Abdul-Raheem	22 September 1993 (aged 25)	44	10	(Iraq Football Association) Al-Zawraa
11	MF	Humam Tariq	10 February 1996 (aged 23)	56	3	(Football Federation Islamic Republic of Iran) Esteghlal
12	GK	Mohammed Saleh	12 June 1995 (aged 24)	0	0	(Iraq Football Association) Al-Karkh
13	MF	Mazin Fayyadh	2 April 1997 (aged 22)	10	1	(Iraq Football Association) Al-Naft
14	MF	Amjad Attwan	12 March 1997 (aged 22)	35	0	(Iraq Football Association) Al-Shorta
15	DF	Dhurgham Ismail	24 May 1994 (aged 25)	45	3	(Iraq Football Association) Al-Shorta
16	MF	Karrar Nabeel	16 January 1998 (aged 21)	2	0	(Iraq Football Association) Al-Quwa Al-Jawiya
17	DF	Alaa Mhawi	3 June 1996 (aged 23)	26	0	(Iraq Football Association) Al-Shorta
18	FW	Ayman Hussein	22 March 1996 (aged 23)	25	2	(Tunisian Football Federation) CS Sfaxien
19	MF	Mahdi Kamel	6 January 1995 (aged 24)	47	3	(Iraq Football Association) Al-Shorta
20	GK	Mohammed Hameed	24 January 1993 (aged 26)	25	0	(Iraq Football Association) Al-Shorta
21	MF	Mohammed Qasim	6 December 1996 (aged 22)	1	0	(Iraq Football Association) Al-Quwa Al-Jawiya
22	DF	Najm Shwan	9 July 1997 (aged 22)	0	0	(Iraq Football Association) Al-Zawraa
23	DF	Maitham Jabbar	10 November 2000 (aged 18)	2	0	(Iraq Football Association) Al-Karkh

=== Syria ===
Coach: Fajr Ibrahim

Syria's 26-man preliminary squad was announced on 23 July 2019. The final squad was announced on 29 July. Mohammed Al Wakid withdrew injured and was replaced by Ahmad Al Douni on 1 August.

No.	Pos.	Player	Date of birth (age)	Caps	Goals	Club
1	GK	Ibrahim Alma	18 October 1991 (aged 27)	52	0	(Syrian Football Association) Al-Wahda
2	DF	Ahmad Al Saleh	20 May 1990 (aged 29)	46	2	(Lebanese Football Association) Al-Ahed
3	DF	Hussein Jwayed	1 January 1993 (aged 26)	21	0	(Iraq Football Association) Al-Zawraa
4	DF	Abdullah Al Shami	2 March 1994 (aged 25)	3	0	(Syrian Football Association) Al-Taliya
5	DF	Fares Arnaout	31 January 1997 (aged 22)	3	0	(Syrian Football Association) Al-Jaish
6	DF	Amro Jenyat	15 January 1993 (aged 26)	23	1	(Oman Football Association) Al-Shabab
7	FW	Ahmad Al Douni	29 January 1989 (aged 30)	22	7	(Qatar Football Association) Al-Mesaimeer
8	MF	Ward Al Salama	15 July 1994 (aged 25)	3	0	(Syrian Football Association) Tishreen
9	FW	Bassel Moustafa	13 September 1990 (aged 28)	0	0	(Syrian Football Association) Al-Jaish
10	FW	Firas Al-Khatib (captain)	9 June 1983 (aged 36)	69	33	(Kuwait Football Association) Al-Salmiya
11	MF	Anas Balhous	3 August 1986 (aged 32)	1	0	(Oman Football Association) Al-Shabab
12	MF	Kamel Koaeh	6 June 1998 (aged 21)	0	0	(Syrian Football Association) Al-Shorta
13	MF	Mohammad Al Ahmad	8 January 1994 (aged 25)	3	0	(Syrian Football Association) Al-Ittihad
14	MF	Tamer Haj Mohamad	3 April 1990 (aged 29)	34	1	(Saudi Arabian Football Federation) Ohod
15	MF	Mohammad Anz	14 May 1995 (aged 24)	3	0	(Kuwait Football Association) Al-Sulaibikhat
16	MF	Ahmed Ashkar	1 January 1996 (aged 23)	13	0	(Syrian Football Association) Al-Ittihad
17	DF	Abdal Razak Al Mohamad	16 January 1995 (aged 24)	3	0	(Syrian Football Association) Al-Taliya
18	FW	Mardik Mardikian	14 March 1992 (aged 27)	28	3	(Syrian Football Association) Hutteen
19	DF	Khaled Kurdaghli	31 January 1997 (aged 22)	3	0	(Syrian Football Association) Tishreen
20	MF	Khaled Mobayed	6 March 1993 (aged 26)	34	2	(Syrian Football Association) Tishreen
21	MF	Mohammad Marmour	17 September 1995 (aged 23)	10	3	(Syrian Football Association) Tishreen
22	GK	Khaled Ibrahim	10 January 1996 (aged 23)	0	0	(Syrian Football Association) Al-Ittihad
23	GK	Ahmad Madania	1 January 1990 (aged 29)	10	0	(Syrian Football Association) Tishreen

=== Yemen ===
Coach: Sami Al Nash

Yemen's 30-man preliminary squad was announced on 11 July 2019. The final squad was announced on 27 July.

No.	Pos.	Player	Date of birth (age)	Caps	Goals	Club
1	GK	Mohammed Ayash	6 March 1986 (aged 33)	60	0	(Iraq Football Association) Erbil
2	DF	Ahmed Al Khamri	28 December 1992 (aged 26)	20	1	(Qatar Football Association) Al-Ahli
3	DF	Mohammed Fuad Omar	13 March 1989 (aged 30)	31	4	(Qatar Football Association) Muaither
4	DF	Mudir Al-Radaei	1 January 1993 (aged 26)	30	1	(Qatar Football Association) Al-Arabi
5	DF	Ala Addin Mahdi	1 January 1996 (aged 23)	19	0	(Oman Football Association) Al-Rustaq
6	DF	Abdulaziz Al-Gumaei	8 January 1990 (aged 29)	21	0	(Qatar Football Association) Al-Mesaimeer
7	FW	Ahmed Al-Sarori	9 August 1998 (aged 20)	12	3	(Qatar Football Association) Al-Markhiya
8	MF	Ahmed Abdulrab	27 April 1994 (aged 25)	12	0	(Yemen Football Association) Al-Wehda Aden
9	MF	Omar Al-Dahi	15 December 1999 (aged 19)	0	0	(Yemen Football Association)
10	FW	Mohsen Qarawi	2 March 1989 (aged 30)	3	0	(Oman Football Association) Al-Mudhaibi
11	MF	Abdulwasea Al-Matari	4 July 1994 (aged 25)	29	7	(United Arab Emirates Football Association) Dibba Al-Hisn
12	FW	Ahmed Maher	24 January 2002 (aged 17)	0	0	(Yemen Football Association)
13	DF	Mohammed Mahyoub	5 November 1997 (aged 21)	0	0	(Yemen Football Association)
14	MF	Manaf Saeed	23 November 1998 (aged 20)	1	0	(Yemen Football Association)
15	MF	Mohammed Salem	13 January 1997 (aged 22)	0	0	(Yemen Football Association)
16	DF	Nasser Al-Gahwashi	24 May 1999 (aged 20)	0	0	(Yemen Football Association)
17	FW	Mufeed Gamal	1 October 2000 (aged 18)	0	0	(Yemen Football Association)
18	MF	Ali Hafeedh	21 February 1997 (aged 22)	2	0	(Yemen Football Association) Al-Wehda Aden
19	DF	Mohammed Boqshan	10 March 1994 (aged 25)	26	3	(Qatar Football Association) Al-Khor
20	FW	Emad Mansoor	15 April 1992 (aged 27)	13	1	(Oman Football Association) Bidiyah Club
21	FW	Mohammed Ba Rowis	4 December 1988 (aged 30)	24	1	(Yemen Football Association) Al-Wehda Aden
22	GK	Salem Saeed (captain)	1 January 1984 (aged 35)	48	0	(Yemen Football Association) Al-Ahli Sana'a
23	GK	Salem Al-Harsh	7 October 1998 (aged 20)	3	0	(Yemen Football Association) Al-Wehda Aden

=== Palestine ===
Coach: (Algeria) Noureddine Ould Ali

Palestine's final squad was announced on 26 July 2019.

No.	Pos.	Player	Date of birth (age)	Caps	Goals	Club
1	GK	Tawfiq Ali	8 November 1990 (aged 28)	32	0	(Palestinian Football Association) Taraji Wadi Al-Nes
2	DF	Ahmed Qatmish	10 March 1998 (aged 21)	0	0	(Palestinian Football Association) Thaqafi Tulkarem
3	MF	Mohammed Bassim	3 July 1995 (aged 24)	11	0	(Palestinian Football Association) Shabab Al-Bireh
4	DF	Mohammed Abumayyala	19 February 1995 (aged 24)	14	0	(Palestinian Football Association) Hilal Al-Quds
5	DF	Ahmed Bahdari	1 July 1986 (aged 33)	0	0	(Palestinian Football Association) Khadamat Rafah
6	MF	Shadi Shaban	4 March 1992 (aged 27)	19	0	(Palestinian Football Association) Ahli Al-Khaleel
7	MF	Mahmoud Abu Warda	31 May 1995 (aged 24)	1	1	(Palestinian Football Association) Markaz Balata
8	MF	Mohammed Yamin	19 September 1994 (aged 24)	15	0	(Palestinian Football Association) Hilal Al-Quds
9	FW	Oday Dabbagh	3 December 1998 (aged 20)	15	1	(Kuwait Football Association) Al-Salmiya
10	FW	Mohammed Balah	4 September 1993 (aged 25)	6	1	(Oman Football Association) Al-Orouba
11	FW	Rami Al-Masalma	12 November 1991 (aged 27)	5	0	(Palestinian Football Association) Shabab Al-Khalil
12	MF	Amir Qatawi	1 May 1999 (aged 20)	0	0	(Palestinian Football Association) Markaz Balata
13	MF	Mohammed Jabari	19 May 1998 (aged 21)	0	0	(Palestinian Football Association) Ahli Al-Khaleel
14	DF	Abdallah Jaber	17 February 1993 (aged 26)	47	2	(Palestinian Football Association) Ahli Al-Khaleel
15	DF	Abdelatif Bahdari (captain)	20 February 1984 (aged 35)	64	9	(Palestinian Football Association) Markaz Balata
16	GK	Anas Abusaif	20 April 1995 (aged 24)	0	0	(Palestinian Football Association) Shabab Al-Khalil
17	DF	Mousa Farawi	22 March 1998 (aged 21)	0	0	(Palestinian Football Association) Hilal Al-Quds
18	DF	Haytham Khairallah	7 July 1992 (aged 27)	0	0	(Palestinian Football Association) Palestinian Forces
19	FW	Raed Dahla	1 February 1998 (aged 21)	0	0	(Palestinian Football Association) Shabab Al-Bireh
20	DF	Yaser Hamed	9 December 1997 (aged 21)	0	0	(Royal Spanish Football Federation) Portugalete
21	MF	Islam Batran	1 October 1994 (aged 24)	10	0	(Jordan Football Association) Al-Jazeera
22	GK	Rami Hamadeh	24 March 1994 (aged 25)	9	0	(Palestinian Football Association) Hilal Al-Quds
23	MF	Mohammed Darweesh	2 June 1991 (aged 28)	30	0	(Palestinian Football Association) Hilal Al-Quds

=== Lebanon ===
Coach: (Romania) Liviu Ciobotariu

Lebanon's 42-man preliminary squad was announced on 28 June 2019. The final squad was announced on 24 July. Ali Sabeh withdrew injured and was replaced by Ali Daher on 31 July.

No.	Pos.	Player	Date of birth (age)	Caps	Goals	Club
1	GK	Mehdi Khalil	19 September 1991 (aged 27)	33	0	(Lebanese Football Association) Al-Ahed
2	DF	Kassem El Zein	2 December 1990 (aged 28)	12	0	(Lebanese Football Association) Nejmeh
3	DF	Mootaz El Jounaidi	20 January 1986 (aged 33)	45	0	(Lebanese Football Association) Al-Ansar
4	DF	Nour Mansour	22 October 1989 (aged 29)	44	2	(Lebanese Football Association) Al-Ahed
5	DF	Khalil Khamis	12 January 1995 (aged 24)	1	0	(Lebanese Football Association) Al-Ahed
6	DF	Hussein Zein	27 January 1995 (aged 24)	1	0	(Lebanese Football Association) Al-Ahed
7	FW	Hassan Maatouk (captain)	10 August 1987 (aged 31)	75	20	(Lebanese Football Association) Al-Ansar
8	FW	Hassan Chaito	20 March 1989 (aged 30)	50	5	(Lebanese Football Association) Al-Ansar
9	FW	Soony Saad	17 August 1992 (aged 26)	11	3	(Lebanese Football Association) Al-Ansar
10	MF	Mohamad Haidar	8 November 1989 (aged 29)	57	4	(Lebanese Football Association) Al-Ahed
11	FW	Mohamad Kdouh	10 July 1997 (aged 22)	0	0	(Lebanese Football Association) Al-Ahed
12	DF	Hassan Bitar	18 May 1992 (aged 27)	0	0	(Lebanese Football Association) Al-Ansar
13	FW	Ahmad Hijazi	22 August 1994 (aged 24)	0	0	(Lebanese Football Association) Al-Ahed
14	MF	Nader Matar	12 May 1992 (aged 27)	28	0	(Lebanese Football Association) Nejmeh
15	MF	Yahya El Hindi	24 September 1998 (aged 20)	0	0	(Lebanese Football Association) Nejmeh
16	DF	Hassan Chaitou	16 June 1991 (aged 28)	1	0	(Lebanese Football Association) Al-Ansar
17	DF	Mohamed Zein Tahan	20 April 1988 (aged 31)	30	1	(Lebanese Football Association) Safa
18	MF	Hussein Monzer	20 March 1997 (aged 22)	0	0	(Lebanese Football Association) Al-Ahed
19	FW	Ali Alaaeddine	8 September 1993 (aged 25)	0	0	(Lebanese Football Association) Nejmeh
20	FW	Rabih Ataya	16 July 1989 (aged 30)	26	4	(Lebanese Football Association) Al-Ahed
21	GK	Mostafa Matar	10 September 1995 (aged 23)	0	0	(Lebanese Football Association) Salam Zgharta
22	MF	Ahmad Jalloul	23 January 1992 (aged 27)	12	0	(Lebanese Football Association) Nejmeh
23	GK	Ali Daher	26 November 1996 (aged 22)	0	0	(Lebanese Football Association) Shabab Al Sahel

== Group B ==
=== Saudi Arabia ===
Coach: Yousef Anbar

Saudi Arabia's 24-man preliminary squad was announced on 30 July 2019. The final squad was announced on 2 August.

No.	Pos.	Player	Date of birth (age)	Caps	Goals	Club
1	GK	Abdullah Al-Saleh	15 October 1989 (aged 29)	0	0	(Saudi Arabian Football Federation) Al-Ettifaq
2	DF	Mohammed Al-Amri	26 November 1991 (aged 27)	0	0	(Saudi Arabian Football Federation) Al-Raed
3	DF	Hatem Belal	30 January 1994 (aged 25)	0	0	(Saudi Arabian Football Federation) Al-Wehda
4	DF	Muteb Al-Mufarrij	18 August 1996 (aged 22)	1	0	(Saudi Arabian Football Federation) Al-Hilal
5	DF	Hussain Al-Showaish	7 November 1988 (aged 30)	0	0	(Saudi Arabian Football Federation) Al-Raed
6	MF	Abdulkareem Al-Qahtani	9 February 1993 (aged 26)	1	0	(Saudi Arabian Football Federation) Al-Fayha
7	DF	Wesam Al-Sowayed	29 November 1987 (aged 31)	0	0	(Saudi Arabian Football Federation) Al-Hazem
8	MF	Naif Hazazi	30 September 1992 (aged 26)	2	0	(Saudi Arabian Football Federation) Al-Qadsiah
9	FW	Abdulfattah Adam	1 January 1995 (aged 24)	3	2	(Saudi Arabian Football Federation) Al-Nassr
10	FW	Rabee Sufyani	25 January 1987 (aged 32)	4	1	(Saudi Arabian Football Federation) Al-Taawoun
11	FW	Haroune Camara	1 January 1998 (aged 21)	4	0	(Saudi Arabian Football Federation) Al-Ittihad
12	FW	Hassan Sharahili	24 February 1993 (aged 26)	1	0	(Saudi Arabian Football Federation) Al-Batin
13	DF	Fawaz Al-Sqoor	23 April 1996 (aged 23)	0	0	(Saudi Arabian Football Federation) Al-Wehda
14	MF	Mohammed Al-Fuhaid	8 January 1990 (aged 29)	0	0	(Saudi Arabian Football Federation) Al-Fateh
15	FW	Mansor Hamzi	17 January 1992 (aged 27)	0	0	(Saudi Arabian Football Federation) Al-Hazem
16	MF	Abdulmohsen Al-Qahtani	5 June 1999 (aged 20)	0	0	(Saudi Arabian Football Federation) Al-Qadsiah
17	DF	Hassan Tambakti	9 February 1999 (aged 20)	0	0	(Saudi Arabian Football Federation) Al-Shabab
18	FW	Khalid Kaabi	24 May 1992 (aged 27)	1	0	(Saudi Arabian Football Federation) Al-Faisaly
19	MF	Ali Al-Nemer	25 August 1991 (aged 27)	2	0	(Saudi Arabian Football Federation) Al-Wehda
20	MF	Mohammad Al-Majhad	16 July 1998 (aged 21)	0	0	(Saudi Arabian Football Federation) Al-Fateh
21	GK	Abdullah Al-Jadaani	6 October 1991 (aged 27)	0	0	(Saudi Arabian Football Federation) Al-Wehda
22	GK	Mustafa Malayekah	21 May 1986 (aged 33)	4	0	(Saudi Arabian Football Federation) Al-Faisaly
23	DF	Sami Al-Khaibari	18 September 1989 (aged 29)	0	0	(Saudi Arabian Football Federation) Al-Fayha

=== Kuwait ===
Coach: (Croatia) Romeo Jozak

Kuwait's final squad was announced on 28 July 2019.

No.	Pos.	Player	Date of birth (age)	Caps	Goals	Club
1	GK	Hussain Kankone	16 April 1989 (aged 30)	0	0	(Kuwait Football Association) Kazma
2	DF	Sami Al-Sanea	9 January 1993 (aged 26)	7	0	(Kuwait Football Association) Al-Kuwait
3	MF	Ahmed Al-Dhefiri	8 February 1992 (aged 27)	14	0	(Kuwait Football Association) Al-Qadsia
4	DF	Khalid El Ebrahim	28 August 1992 (aged 26)	19	1	(Kuwait Football Association) Al-Qadsia
5	DF	Fahed Al Hajri	10 November 1991 (aged 27)	42	4	(Kuwait Football Association) Al-Kuwait
6	DF	Sultan Al Enezi	29 March 1992 (aged 27)	26	0	(Kuwait Football Association) Al-Qadsia
7	FW	Omar Al-Hebaiter	26 October 1992 (aged 26)	3	0	(Kuwait Football Association) Kazma
8	MF	Abdullah Mawei	28 November 1995 (aged 23)	6	0	(Kuwait Football Association) Al-Qadsia
9	FW	Faisal Ajab	23 January 1993 (aged 26)	10	0	(Kuwait Football Association) Al-Tadhamon
10	MF	Faisal Zayid	9 October 1991 (aged 27)	33	3	(Kuwait Football Association) Al-Kuwait
11	FW	Hussain Al-Musawi	11 July 1988 (aged 31)	20	3	(Kuwait Football Association) Al-Arabi
12	MF	Hamad Al-Harbi	25 July 1992 (aged 27)	2	0	(Kuwait Football Association) Kazma
13	DF	Fahad Hammoud	3 October 1990 (aged 28)	7	0	(Kuwait Football Association) Al-Kuwait
14	MF	Redha Hani	27 October 1996 (aged 22)	7	0	(Kuwait Football Association) Al-Qadsia
15	MF	Shereedah Al-Shereedah	22 June 1992 (aged 27)	10	0	(Kuwait Football Association) Al-Kuwait
16	MF	Mobarak Al-Faneeni	21 January 2000 (aged 19)	0	0	(Kuwait Football Association) Al-Salmiya
17	FW	Bader Al-Mutawa (captain)	10 January 1985 (aged 34)	168	55	(Kuwait Football Association) Al-Qadsia
18	DF	Amer Al-Fadhel	21 April 1988 (aged 31)	50	0	(Kuwait Football Association) Al-Qadsia
19	MF	Mohammed Khaled	24 May 1996 (aged 23)	2	0	(Kuwait Football Association) Al-Nasr
20	FW	Yousef Nasser	9 October 1990 (aged 28)	80	36	(Kuwait Football Association) Al-Qadsia
21	MF	Eid Al-Rashidi	25 May 1999 (aged 20)	1	0	(Kuwait Football Association) Al-Qadsia
22	GK	Sulaiman Abdulghafour	26 February 1991 (aged 28)	16	0	(Kuwait Football Association) Al-Arabi
23	GK	Mohamad Hadi	12 August 1990 (aged 28)	0	0	(Kuwait Football Association) Al-Nasr

=== Bahrain ===
Coach: (Portugal) Hélio Sousa

Bahrain's 28-man preliminary squad was announced on 11 July 2019. The final squad was announced on 2 August.

No.	Pos.	Player	Date of birth (age)	Caps	Goals	Club
1	GK	Sayed Shubbar Alawi	11 August 1985 (aged 33)	19	0	(Bahrain Football Association) Al-Riffa
2	DF	Sayed Baqer	14 April 1994 (aged 25)	10	0	(Kuwait Football Association) Al-Nasr
3	DF	Waleed Al Hayam	3 February 1991 (aged 28)	60	0	(Bahrain Football Association) Al-Muharraq
4	MF	Sayed Dhiya Saeed	17 July 1992 (aged 27)	78	3	(Kuwait Football Association) Al-Nasr
5	DF	Ahmed Bughammar	30 December 1997 (aged 21)	1	0	(Bahrain Football Association) Al-Hidd
6	MF	Mohammed Al-Hardan	6 October 1997 (aged 21)	1	0	(Danish Football Association) Vejle Boldklub
7	FW	Isa Moosa	11 May 1989 (aged 30)	16	0	(Bahrain Football Association) Al-Muharraq
8	MF	Ali Madan	30 November 1995 (aged 23)	27	4	(Bahrain Football Association) Al-Najma
9	MF	Mohamed Abdulwahab	13 November 1989 (aged 29)	0	0	(Bahrain Football Association) Al-Hidd
10	MF	Abdulwahab Al-Malood	7 June 1990 (aged 29)	43	4	(Bahrain Football Association) Al-Hidd
11	FW	Ismail Abdullatif	11 September 1986 (aged 32)	111	40	(Bahrain Football Association) Al-Muharraq
12	GK	Hamed Al-Doseri	24 July 1989 (aged 30)	7	0	(Bahrain Football Association) Al-Riffa
13	FW	Mohamed Al Romaihi	9 September 1990 (aged 28)	20	9	(Bahrain Football Association) Manama
14	MF	Ali Haram	11 December 1988 (aged 30)	4	0	(Bahrain Football Association) Al-Riffa
15	MF	Jasim Al-Shaikh	1 February 1996 (aged 23)	9	0	(Bahrain Football Association) Al-Ahli
16	DF	Ahmed Nabeel	25 August 1995 (aged 23)	0	0	(Bahrain Football Association) Manama
17	DF	Abdulla Al-Haza'a	19 July 1990 (aged 29)	41	0	(Bahrain Football Association) East Riffa
18	DF	Ahmed Abdulla	1 April 1987 (aged 32)	20	3	(Bahrain Football Association) Al-Najma
19	MF	Kamil Al Aswad	8 April 1994 (aged 25)	39	3	(Bahrain Football Association) Al-Riffa
20	FW	Sami Al-Husaini	29 September 1989 (aged 29)	68	8	(Bahrain Football Association) East Riffa
21	GK	Sayed Mohammed Jaffer (captain)	25 August 1985 (aged 33)	115	0	(Bahrain Football Association) Al-Muharraq
22	DF	Mohamed Adel	20 September 1996 (aged 22)	7	0	(Bahrain Football Association) Manama
23	FW	Isa Al-Anezi	14 March 1993 (aged 26)	0	0	(Bahrain Football Association) Al-Riffa

=== Jordan ===
Coach: (Belgium) Vital Borkelmans

Jordan's 26-man preliminary squad was announced on 17 July 2019. The final squad was announced on 30 July.

No.	Pos.	Player	Date of birth (age)	Caps	Goals	Club
1	GK	Yazid Abu Layla	8 January 1993 (aged 26)	7	0	(Jordan Football Association) Al-Faisaly
2	DF	Feras Shelbaieh	27 November 1993 (aged 25)	24	0	(Jordan Football Association) Al-Jazeera
3	DF	Tareq Khattab	6 May 1992 (aged 27)	60	3	(Kuwait Football Association) Al-Salmiya
4	DF	Yousef Abu Jazar	25 October 1999 (aged 19)	0	0	(Jordan Football Association) Al-Ramtha
5	MF	Yazan Abu Arab	31 January 1996 (aged 23)	16	0	(Jordan Football Association) Al-Jazeera
6	MF	Saeed Murjan	10 February 1990 (aged 29)	70	12	(Jordan Football Association) Al-Wehdat
7	MF	Yousef Al-Rawashdeh	14 March 1990 (aged 29)	44	4	(United Arab Emirates Football Association) Dibba Al-Fujairah
8	MF	Noor Al-Rawabdeh	24 February 1997 (aged 22)	0	0	(Jordan Football Association) Al-Jazeera
9	FW	Abdullah Al-Attar	4 October 1992 (aged 26)	2	0	(Jordan Football Association) Al-Jazeera
10	MF	Ahmed Samir	27 March 1991 (aged 28)	32	4	(Jordan Football Association) Al-Jazeera
11	FW	Mohammad Abu Zraiq	30 December 1997 (aged 21)	2	0	(Jordan Football Association) Al-Ramtha
12	GK	Ahmed Abdel-Sattar (captain)	6 July 1984 (aged 35)	9	0	(Jordan Football Association) Al-Jazeera
13	MF	Khalil Bani Attiah	8 June 1991 (aged 28)	77	8	(Jordan Football Association) Al-Faisaly
14	FW	Ahmad Ersan	28 September 1995 (aged 23)	11	1	(Jordan Football Association) Al-Faisaly
15	DF	Bara' Marei	13 April 1994 (aged 25)	7	0	(Jordan Football Association) Al-Faisaly
16	FW	Saleh Rateb	18 December 1994 (aged 24)	13	0	(Jordan Football Association) Al-Wehdat
17	DF	Salem Al-Ajalin	18 February 1988 (aged 31)	14	0	(Jordan Football Association) Al-Faisaly
18	MF	Hassan Zahrawi	13 May 1996 (aged 23)	0	0	(Jordan Football Association) Al-Ramtha
19	DF	Anas Bani Yaseen	29 November 1988 (aged 30)	116	9	(Jordan Football Association) Al-Faisaly
20	FW	Hamza Al-Dardour	12 May 1991 (aged 28)	74	26	(Jordan Football Association) Al-Wehdat
21	DF	Mohammad Bani Atieh	13 February 1999 (aged 20)	0	0	(Jordan Football Association) Al-Faisaly
22	GK	Waleed Ibrahim	16 February 1999 (aged 20)	0	0	(Jordan Football Association) Al-Jazeera
23	DF	Ihsan Haddad	5 February 1994 (aged 25)	51	3	(Jordan Football Association) Al-Faisaly

== Statistics ==
=== Age ===
Of the seven teenagers in the competition, Yemen's Ahmed Maher was the youngest at 17 years, 187 days as of the first day of the tournament, and Yemen's Salem Al-Harsh was the youngest goalkeeper. At 36 years, 51 days, Syria's Firas Al-Khatib was the oldest player and oldest captain, and Jordan's Moataz Yaseen was the oldest goalkeeper.

=== Player representation by league system ===
League systems with the country's national team present are listed. In all, WAFF Championship squad members played for clubs in 14 countries.

Country	Players	Percentage	Outside national squad
Kuwait	29	14.01%	6
Lebanon	24	11.59%	1
Saudi Arabia	24	11.59%	1
Iraq	22	10.63%	2
Jordan	22	10.63%	1
Bahrain	20	9.66%	0
Palestine	19	9.18%	0
Syria	15	7.25%	0
Yemen	13	6.28%	0
Others	13	6.28%	13
Total	207	100%	24

- Three squads (Kuwait, Lebanon and Saudi Arabia) were made up entirely of players from the country's domestic league.
- The Yemen squad had the most players from a single foreign federation, with six players employed in Qatar.
- Of the countries not represented by a national team at the World Cup, Qatar's league provided the most squad members.

=== Player representation by club ===
Clubs with six or more players represented are listed.

Club	Players
(Lebanon) Al-Ahed	10
(Jordan) Al-Faisaly	9
(Kuwait) Al-Qadsia	9
(Iraq) Al-Zawraa	8
(Jordan) Al-Jazeera	8
Al-Kuwait	6
(Bahrain) Al-Riffa	6
(Lebanon) Al-Ansar	6
