= 2019 AFC Asian Cup Group D =

Football tournament group stage

Group D of the 2019 AFC Asian Cup took place from 7 to 16 January 2019. The group consisted of Iran, Iraq, Vietnam and Yemen. The top two teams, Iran and Iraq, along with third-placed Vietnam (as one of the four best third-placed teams), advanced to the round of 16.

The group contained two former champions, Iran (3 titles) and Iraq (1 title). Yemen made their debut at the tournament.

== Teams ==
Draw position	Team	Zone	Method of qualification	Date of qualification	Finals appearance	Last appearance	Previous best performance	FIFA Rankings	
Draw position	Team	Zone	Method of qualification	Date of qualification	Finals appearance	Last appearance	Previous best performance	April 2018 (Note: The rankings of April 2018 were used for seeding for the final draw.)	December 2018
D1	Iran	CAFA	Second round group D winners	29 March 2016	14th	2015 (quarter-finals)	Winners (1968, 1972, 1976)	36	29
D2	Iraq	WAFF	Second round 1st best runners-up	29 March 2016	10th	2015 (fourth place)	Winners (2007)	88	88
D3	Vietnam (Note: From 1956 to 1960, Vietnam competed as South Vietnam until 1975.)	AFF	Third Round Group C runners-up	14 November 2017	4th	2007 (quarter-finals)	Fourth place (1956, 1960)	103	100
D4	Yemen (Note: South Yemen qualified in 1976, but this is not counted due to FIFA and AFC categorising the participation as a distinct record from Yemen, who succeeded North Yemen after 1990.)	WAFF	Third Round Group F runners-up	27 March 2018	1st	—	Debut	125	135

== Standings ==
Pos	Team	Pld	W	D	L	GF	GA	GD	Pts	Qualification
1	Iran	3	2	1	0	7	0	+7	7	Advance to knockout stage
2	Iraq	3	2	1	0	6	2	+4	7	Advance to knockout stage
3	Vietnam	3	1	0	2	4	5	−1	3	Advance to knockout stage
4	Yemen	3	0	0	3	0	10	−10	0	

Source: AFC
Rules for classification: Group stage tiebreakers

In the round of 16:

- The winners of Group D, Iran, advanced to play the third-placed team of Group F, Oman.
- The runners-up of Group D, Iraq, advanced to play the winners of Group E, Qatar.
- The third-placed team of Group D, Vietnam, advanced to play the winners of Group B, Jordan (as one of the four best third-placed teams).

== Matches ==
All times listed are GST (UTC+4).

=== Iran vs Yemen ===
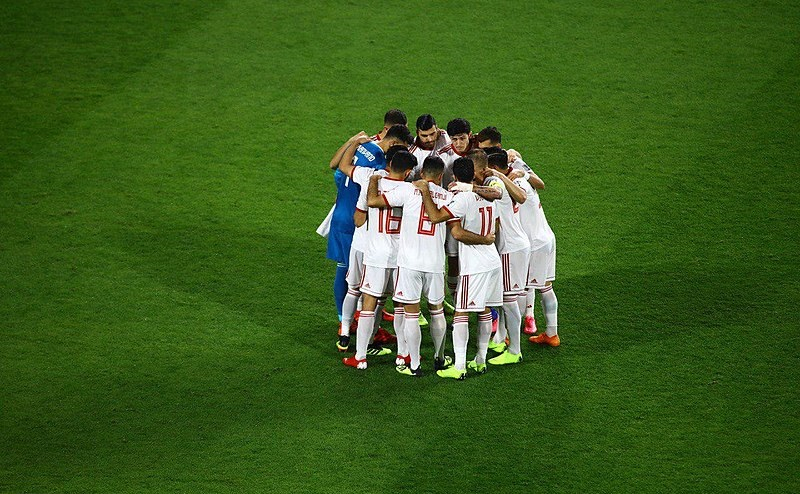
Iranian players before the match.

Yemen had the first chance of the match in the seventh minute when Ahmed Al-Sarori ran into the penalty area and flashed a shot narrowly over the bar. Mehdi Taremi opened the scoring in the 12th minute when he converted the rebound after Yemeni goalkeeper Saoud Al-Sowadi pushed Sardar Azmoun's long-range effort back into his path. At 23 minutes, Ashkan Dejagah's free kick found the back of the net via a combination of both the woodwork and Al-Sowadi, before Taremi bagged his second of the night by heading home Ramin Rezaeian's cross moments later. In the second half, after Al-Sowadi had repelled two Azmoun headers, the forward finished from close-range on 53 minutes to further extend Iran's lead. Azmoun was later denied by Mudir Al-Radaei's challenge when through on goal and his shot struck the bar with 14 minutes remaining. Substitute Saman Ghoddos added a fifth from the edge of the area shortly after, while Mehdi Torabi's drive struck the post in added time.

7 January 2019
20:00

Iran	5–0	Yemen
Taremi 12', 25'; Dejagah 23'; Azmoun 53'; Ghoddos 78'	Report

Mohammed bin Zayed Stadium, Abu Dhabi
Attendance: 5,301
Referee: Ryuji Sato (Japan)

Iran	Yemen

GK	1	Alireza Beiranvand
RB	23	Ramin Rezaeian	(yellow card) 39'
CB	19	Majid Hosseini		(substituted off) 46'
CB	8	Morteza Pouraliganji
LB	3	Ehsan Hajsafi
DM	9	Omid Ebrahimi
RM	21	Ashkan Dejagah (c)
LM	11	Vahid Amiri		(substituted off) 60'
AM	16	Mehdi Torabi
CF	17	Mehdi Taremi		(substituted off) 71'
CF	20	Sardar Azmoun
Substitutions:
DF	15	Pejman Montazeri		(substituted on) 46'
MF	14	Saman Ghoddos		(substituted on) 60'
FW	10	Karim Ansarifard		(substituted on) 71'
Manager:
(Portugal) Carlos Queiroz

GK	23	Saoud Al-Sowadi
RB	21	Mohammed Ba Rowis
CB	3	Mohammed Fuad Omar		(substituted off) 57'
CB	4	Mudir Al-Radaei	(yellow card) 83'
LB	13	Ala Addin Mahdi	(yellow card) 90'
DM	12	Ahmed Al-Haifi	(yellow card) 80'
RM	11	Abdulwasea Al-Matari	(yellow card) 77'	(substituted off) 87'
CM	8	Wahid Al Khyat		(substituted off) 64'
CM	9	Ala Al-Sasi (c)
LM	7	Ahmed Al-Sarori
CF	20	Emad Mansoor
Substitutions:
DF	15	Ammar Hamsan		(substituted on) 57'
MF	6	Ahmed Abdulrab		(substituted on) 64'
FW	10	Ahmed Dhabaan		(substituted on) 87'
Manager:
(Slovakia) Ján Kocian

Man of the Match:
Ashkan Dejagah (Iran)

Assistant referees:
Hiroshi Yamauchi (Japan)
Jun Mihara (Japan)
Fourth official:
Palitha Hemathunga (Sri Lanka)
Additional assistant referees:
Jumpei Iida (Japan)
Hiroyuki Kimura (Japan)

=== Iraq vs Vietnam ===
Iraq and Vietnam have only met once at the Asian Cup back in 2007, when Iraq defeated Vietnam 2–0 on the road to their first Asian title.

After a slow start to the proceedings, Iraq came closest to breaking the deadlock through Hussein Ali's shot from distance which Đặng Văn Lâm tipped around his left-hand post on 14 minutes. Vietnam took the lead 10 minutes later, Nguyễn Quang Hải’s attempted pass saw defender Ali Faez turn the ball past the onrushing Jalal Hassan and into his own net. Iraq scored the equaliser shortly after the half-hour mark when Đỗ Duy Mạnh's defensive lapse saw Mohanad Ali surge into the area and fire home past a diving Văn Lâm. With three minutes of the first period remaining, Vietnam regained the lead as Nguyễn Công Phượng bundled home the rebound after Nguyễn Trọng Hoàng's shot had been parried into his path by Hassan. After the break, Safaa Hadi was denied by Văn Lâm and on the other end, Hassan dived to smother a Công Phượng effort. In the 60th minute, substitute Humam Tariq smashed the ball into the roof of the net after Vietnam had failed to clear Mohanad Ali's close-range effort. Ali Adnan curled home a 90th minute free kick from 20 yards to seal the victory for Iraq.

8 January 2019
17:30

Iraq	3–2	Vietnam
M. Ali 35'; Tariq 60'; Adnan 90'	Report	Faez 24' (o.g.); Nguyễn Công Phượng 42'

Zayed Sports City Stadium, Abu Dhabi
Attendance: 4,779
Referee: Abdulrahman Al-Jassim (Qatar)

Iraq	Vietnam

GK	1	Jalal Hassan (c)
RB	2	Ahmad Ibrahim
CB	3	Frans Dhia Putros		(substituted off) 37'
CB	7	Safaa Hadi
LB	5	Ali Faez
CM	23	Waleed Salim		(substituted off) 78'
CM	8	Osama Rashid	(yellow card) 18'	(substituted off) 58'
CM	6	Ali Adnan
AM	16	Hussein Ali
SS	9	Ahmed Yasin
CF	10	Mohanad Ali
Substitutions:
MF	13	Bashar Resan		(substituted on) 37'
FW	11	Humam Tariq		(substituted on) 58'
DF	17	Alaa Ali Mhawi		(substituted on) 78'
Manager:
(Slovenia) Srečko Katanec

GK	23	Đặng Văn Lâm
CB	3	Quế Ngọc Hải (c)
CB	2	Đỗ Duy Mạnh	(yellow card) 48'
CB	4	Bùi Tiến Dũng
RM	8	Nguyễn Trọng Hoàng	(yellow card) 1'
CM	6	Lương Xuân Trường		(substituted off) 65'
CM	16	Đỗ Hùng Dũng
LM	12	Nguyễn Phong Hồng Duy
RF	19	Nguyễn Quang Hải
CF	10	Nguyễn Công Phượng		(substituted off) 63'
LF	20	Phan Văn Đức		(substituted off) 82'
Substitutions:
FW	18	Hà Đức Chinh		(substituted on) 63'
MF	7	Nguyễn Huy Hùng		(substituted on) 65'
DF	5	Đoàn Văn Hậu		(substituted on) 82'
Manager:
(South Korea) Park Hang-seo

Man of the Match:
Ali Adnan (Iraq)

Assistant referees:
Taleb Al-Marri (Qatar)
Saud Al-Maqaleh (Qatar)
Fourth official:
Abu Bakar Al-Amri (Oman)
Additional assistant referees:
Khamis Al-Marri (Qatar)
Khamis Al-Kuwari (Qatar)

=== Vietnam vs Iran ===
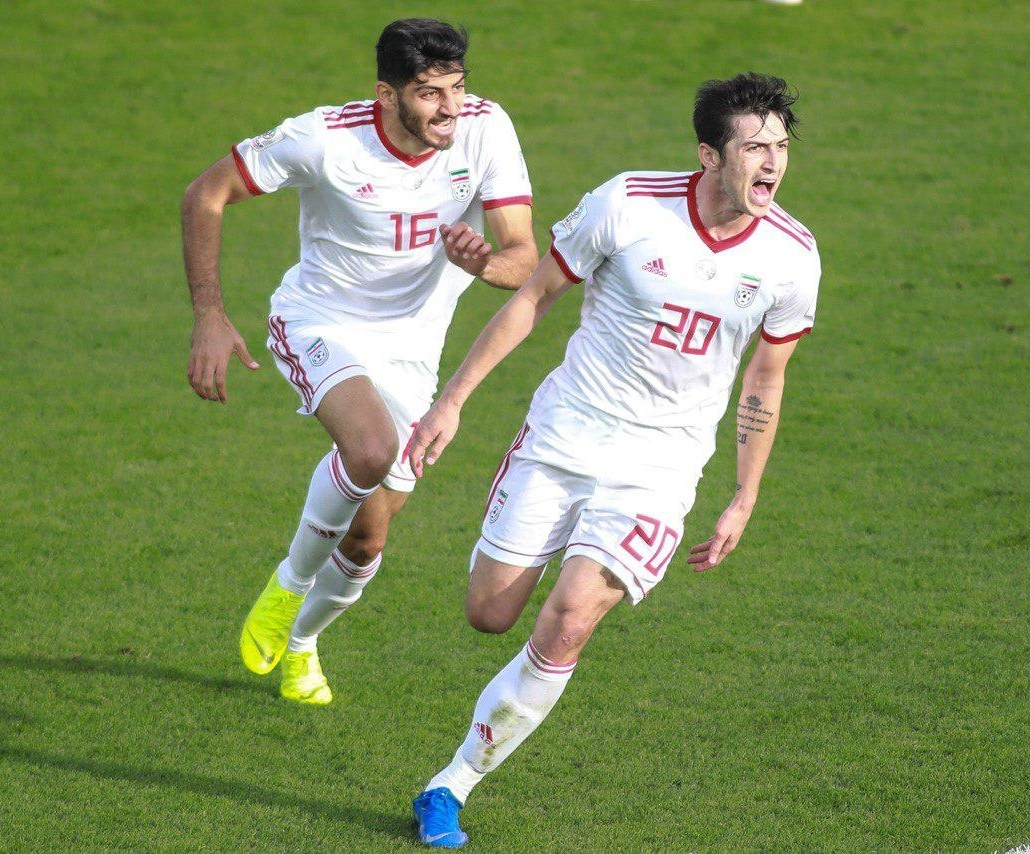
Sardar Azmoun and Mehdi Torabi

Iran had the first chance of the game, Vahid Amiri failed to apply a finishing touch at the far post following Ashkan Dejagah’s 11th minute corner. Vietnamese goalkeeper Đặng Văn Lâm then denied Saman Ghoddos before producing another stop to repel a Sardar Azmoun drive shortly before the half-hour mark. The breakthrough came on at 38 minutes when Azmoun headed home a Ghoddos cross, sending his side into the half-time break holding a slender lead. In the 52nd minute, substitute Nguyễn Văn Toàn's pass found Nguyễn Công Phượng, whose shot from 12 yards was parried to safety by the advancing Alireza Beiranvand. Moments later, Azmoun forced Văn Lâm into another save, only to see Mehdi Taremi lash the subsequent rebound wide off the target. At 68 minutes, Azmoun gathered a Mehdi Torabi pass and fired past Văn Lâm to extend his side’s advantage and register his third goal of the tournament. Nguyễn Quang Hải then curled a late effort narrowly off target and Iran held on to register a record ninth successive AFC Asian Cup group stage victory.

12 January 2019
15:00

Vietnam	0–2	Iran
	Report	Azmoun 38', 69'

Al Nahyan Stadium, Abu Dhabi
Attendance: 10,841
Referee: Muhammad Taqi (Singapore)

Vietnam	Iran

GK	23	Đặng Văn Lâm
CB	3	Quế Ngọc Hải (c)
CB	2	Đỗ Duy Mạnh	(yellow card) 90+1'
CB	4	Bùi Tiến Dũng
RM	8	Nguyễn Trọng Hoàng		(substituted off) 84'
CM	15	Phạm Đức Huy		(substituted off) 59'
CM	16	Đỗ Hùng Dũng
LM	5	Đoàn Văn Hậu	(yellow card) 46'
RF	19	Nguyễn Quang Hải
CF	10	Nguyễn Công Phượng
LF	20	Phan Văn Đức		(substituted off) 46'
Substitutions:
FW	9	Nguyễn Văn Toàn		(substituted on) 46'
MF	11	Ngân Văn Đại		(substituted on) 59'
FW	22	Nguyễn Tiến Linh		(substituted on) 84'
Manager:
(South Korea) Park Hang-seo

GK	1	Alireza Beiranvand
RB	2	Voria Ghafouri
CB	8	Morteza Pouraliganji
CB	13	Hossein Kanaanizadegan
LB	3	Ehsan Hajsafi	(yellow card) 75'
DM	9	Omid Ebrahimi
RM	21	Ashkan Dejagah (c)
LM	11	Vahid Amiri		(substituted off) 64'
AM	14	Saman Ghoddos
CF	17	Mehdi Taremi	(yellow card) 19'	(substituted off) 64'
CF	20	Sardar Azmoun		(substituted off) 79'
Substitutions:
MF	6	Ahmad Nourollahi		(substituted on) 64'
MF	16	Mehdi Torabi		(substituted on) 64'
FW	10	Karim Ansarifard		(substituted on) 79'
Manager:
(Portugal) Carlos Queiroz

Man of the Match:
Sardar Azmoun (Iran)

Assistant referees:
Ronnie Koh Min Kiat (Singapore)
Sergei Grishchenko (Kyrgyzstan)
Fourth official:
Palitha Hemathunga (Sri Lanka)
Additional assistant referees:
César Ramos (Mexico)
Hettikamkanamge Perera (Sri Lanka)

=== Yemen vs Iraq ===
Iraq took the lead in the 11th minute when Mohanad Ali beat the Yemen defence before unleashing a shot from outside the box into the bottom right corner. Yemen had their first look at goal from a set-piece five minutes later, but Abdulwasea Al-Matari sent his header just above the bar. Yemen goalkeeper Saoud Al-Sowadi soon conceded the second goal in the 19th minute when Bashar Resan's strike from the top of the box bounced off the right post before settling in the net. In the second half, both teams came close to finding the net with Ahmed Abdulrab's right-footed shot from outside the box just being kept out by Iraq goalkeeper Jalal Hassan in the 59th minute. Iraq responded five minutes later, with Mohanad coming close to getting his second but his lob was denied by the post and Ahmed Yasin missed the chance to tuck the rebound home. Iraq ended proceedings on a high note as Alaa Abbas scored with a left-footed shot from the centre of the box and into the net.

12 January 2019
17:30

Yemen	0–3	Iraq
	Report	M. Ali 11'; Resan 19'; Abbas 90+1'

Sharjah Stadium, Sharjah
Attendance: 9,757
Referee: Fu Ming (China PR)

Yemen	Iraq

GK	23	Saoud Al-Sowadi
RB	21	Mohammed Ba Rowis
CB	15	Ammar Hamsan
CB	4	Mudir Al-Radaei
LB	13	Ala Addin Mahdi
DM	12	Ahmed Al-Haifi		(substituted off) 46'
RM	11	Abdulwasea Al-Matari
CM	17	Hussein Al-Ghazi		(substituted off) 30'
CM	9	Ala Al-Sasi (c)		(substituted off) 83'
LM	7	Ahmed Al-Sarori
CF	20	Emad Mansoor
Substitutions:
MF	8	Wahid Al Khyat	(yellow card) 52'	(substituted on) 30'
MF	6	Ahmed Abdulrab		(substituted on) 46'
FW	10	Ahmed Dhabaan		(substituted on) 83'
Manager:
(Slovakia) Ján Kocian

GK	1	Jalal Hassan (c)
RB	17	Alaa Ali Mhawi
CB	2	Ahmad Ibrahim
CB	22	Rebin Sulaka
LB	6	Ali Adnan
DM	7	Safaa Hadi
RM	9	Ahmed Yasin
CM	13	Bashar Resan
CM	16	Hussein Ali	(substituted off) 88'
LM	11	Humam Tariq	(substituted off) 55'
CF	10	Mohanad Ali	(substituted off) 71'
Substitutions:
MF	14	Amjad Attwan	(substituted on) 55'
FW	21	Alaa Abbas	(substituted on) 71'
FW	19	Mohammed Dawood	(substituted on) 88'
Manager:
(Slovenia) Srečko Katanec

Man of the Match:
Mohanad Ali (Iraq)

Assistant referees:
Huo Weiming (China PR)
Cao Yi (China PR)
Fourth official:
Mohamad Zainal Abidin (Malaysia)
Additional assistant referees:
Ma Ning (China PR)
Liu Kwok Man (Hong Kong)

=== Vietnam vs Yemen ===
Mudir Al-Radaei involved himself in an altercation with Nguyễn Công Phượng to concede a free kick, picking up a yellow card from referee Ahmed Al-Kaf and from the resulting free kick, Vietnam took the lead. Nguyễn Quang Hải sent a left-foot strike from 25 yards curling away from Salem Al-Harsh and into the top corner of the goal. Ten minutes into the second half, a move started by Đỗ Hùng Dũng's angled ball down the right allowed Nguyễn Trọng Hoàng to pull his cross back to Công Phượng, only for his shot to be blocked by the Yemeni defence. Seconds later, Hùng Dũng's shot was collected by Al-Harsh. Ahmed Al-Sarori outpaced Đoàn Văn Hậu before firing a right foot shot that flew across the face of goal. Four minutes after the hour mark, though, Vietnam added the second from the penalty spot. Phan Văn Đức burst past Abdulaziz Al-Gumaei, surging into the box before the Yemeni defender wrestled him to the ground. Quế Ngọc Hải calmly slid the spot kick home to give Vietnam the win. However, as Vietnam was unable to score more than two goals, Vietnam had been forced to wait until the final group stage matches, in which they managed to become the last team to qualify for the knockout stage.

16 January 2019
20:00

Vietnam	2–0	Yemen
Nguyễn Quang Hải 38'; Quế Ngọc Hải 64' (pen.)	Report

Hazza bin Zayed Stadium, Al Ain
Attendance: 8,237
Referee: Ahmed Al-Kaf (Oman)

Vietnam	Yemen

GK	23	Đặng Văn Lâm
RB	8	Nguyễn Trọng Hoàng
CB	4	Bùi Tiến Dũng
CB	3	Quế Ngọc Hải (c)
LB	5	Đoàn Văn Hậu
DM	12	Nguyễn Phong Hồng Duy
CM	6	Lương Xuân Trường		(substituted off) 53'
CM	16	Đỗ Hùng Dũng
RW	19	Nguyễn Quang Hải
LW	20	Phan Văn Đức		(substituted off) 72'
CF	10	Nguyễn Công Phượng	(yellow card) 78'	(substituted off) 82'
Substitutions:
FW	22	Nguyễn Tiến Linh		(substituted on) 53'
FW	9	Nguyễn Văn Toàn		(substituted on) 72'
MF	14	Trần Minh Vương		(substituted on) 82'
Manager:
(South Korea) Park Hang-seo

GK	22	Salem Al-Harsh
RB	21	Mohammed Ba Rowis
CB	15	Ammar Hamsan		(substituted off) 57'
CB	4	Mudir Al-Radaei
LB	13	Ala Addin Mahdi	(yellow card) 27'
DM	19	Mohammed Boqshan
RM	11	Abdulwasea Al-Matari
CM	8	Wahid Al Khyat	(yellow card) 37'	(substituted off) 76'
CM	9	Ala Al-Sasi (c)
LM	7	Ahmed Al-Sarori
CF	20	Emad Mansoor		(substituted off) 25'
Substitutions:
FW	10	Ahmed Dhabaan		(substituted on) 25'
DF	5	Abdulaziz Al-Gumaei	(yellow card) 63'	(substituted on) 57'
FW	18	Ahmed Alos		(substituted on) 76'
Manager:
(Slovakia) Ján Kocian

Man of the Match:
Nguyễn Quang Hải (Vietnam)

Assistant referees:
Abu Bakar Al-Amri (Oman)
Rashid Al-Ghaithi (Oman)
Fourth official:
Hiroshi Yamauchi (Japan)
Additional assistant referees:
Jumpei Iida (Japan)
Hiroyuki Kimura (Japan)

=== Iran vs Iraq ===
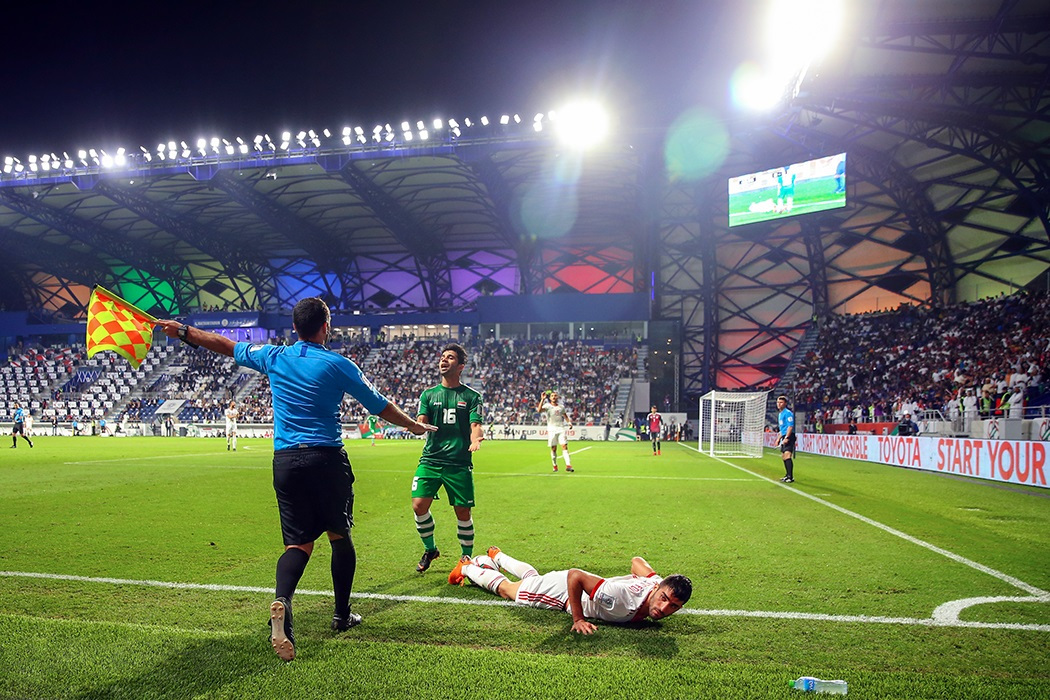
Iran vs. Iraq

Iran had the first chance at goal in the 12th minute when Vahid Amiri sent a cross into the box but Sardar Azmoun’s header was just off the mark. Three minutes from the half-time whistle, Alireza Jahanbakhsh latched on to Azmoun’s deflected attempt but couldn’t get his left-footed strike on target. Iran, in a bid to break down the Iraq defence, boosted their attacking prowess by bringing on Mehdi Taremi and Mehdi Torabi in the 63rd and 75th minutes respectively. However, it was Iraq who nearly took the lead in the 77th minute when substitute Alaa Abbas’s header was tipped over the bar by Alireza Beiranvand. As the minutes ticked away, neither team was able to make headway as they settled for a share of the spoils.

16 January 2019
20:00

Iran	0–0	Iraq
	Report

Al Maktoum Stadium, Dubai
Attendance: 15,038
Referee: Ravshan Irmatov (Uzbekistan)

Iran	Iraq

GK	1	Alireza Beiranvand
CB	4	Rouzbeh Cheshmi		(substituted off) 80'
CB	13	Hossein Kanaanizadegan
CB	19	Majid Hosseini
RWB	2	Voria Ghafouri
LWB	5	Milad Mohammadi
DM	9	Omid Ebrahimi (c)
RM	18	Alireza Jahanbakhsh		(substituted off) 63'
LM	11	Vahid Amiri	(yellow card) 68'
AM	14	Saman Ghoddos	(yellow card) 39'	(substituted off) 75'
CF	20	Sardar Azmoun
Substitutions:
MF	17	Mehdi Taremi		(substituted on) 63'
MF	16	Mehdi Torabi		(substituted on) 75'
MF	21	Ashkan Dejagah		(substituted on) 80'
Manager:
(Portugal) Carlos Queiroz

GK	1	Jalal Hassan (c)
RB	17	Alaa Ali Mhawi
CB	2	Ahmad Ibrahim	(yellow card) 78'
CB	5	Ali Faez
LB	6	Ali Adnan	(yellow card) 82'
CM	7	Safaa Hadi
CM	14	Amjad Attwan	(yellow card) 34'
RW	9	Ahmed Yasin		(substituted off) 46'
AM	16	Hussein Ali		(substituted off) 77'
LW	11	Humam Tariq
CF	10	Mohanad Ali		(substituted off) 71'
Substitutions:
MF	13	Bashar Resan		(substituted on) 46'
FW	21	Alaa Abbas		(substituted on) 71'
FW	19	Mohammed Dawood		(substituted on) 77'
Manager:
(Slovenia) Srečko Katanec

Man of the Match:
Alireza Beiranvand (Iran)

Assistant referees:
Abdukhamidullo Rasulov (Uzbekistan)
Jakhongir Saidov (Uzbekistan)
Fourth official:
Sergei Grishchenko (Kyrgyzstan)
Additional assistant referees:
Valentin Kovalenko (Uzbekistan)
Ilgiz Tantashev (Uzbekistan)

== Discipline ==
Fair play points were used as tiebreakers if the head-to-head and overall records of teams were tied (and if a penalty shoot-out was not applicable as a tiebreaker). These were calculated based on yellow and red cards received in all group matches as follows:

- yellow card = 1 point
- red card as a result of two yellow cards = 3 points
- direct red card = 3 points
- yellow card followed by direct red card = 4 points

Only one of the above deductions was applied to a player in a single match.

Team	Match 1				Match 2				Match 3				Points
Team	Booked	(yellow card) (yellow-red card)	Sent off (straight red)	(yellow card) (red card)	Booked	(yellow card) (yellow-red card)	Sent off (straight red)	(yellow card) (red card)	Booked	(yellow card) (yellow-red card)	Sent off (straight red)	(yellow card) (red card)	Points
Iraq	1								3				−4
Iran	1				2				2				−5
Vietnam	2				2				1				−5
Yemen	4				1				3				−8
