= 21st Arabian Gulf Cup squads =

Below are the squads for the 21st Arabian Gulf Cup in Bahrain played in 2013. Caps and goals are correct prior to the tournament.

== Group A ==
=== Bahrain ===
Coach: (Argentina) Gabriel Calderón

No.	Pos.	Player	Date of birth (age)	Club
1	GK	Sayed Mohammed Jaffer	25 August 1985 (aged 27)	(Bahrain Football Association) Al-Muharraq
2	DF	Mohamed Husain	31 July 1980 (aged 32)	(Qatar Football Association) Umm-Salal
3	DF	Abdulla Al-Marzooqi	12 December 1980 (aged 32)	(Bahrain Football Association) Riffa
4	MF	Sayed Dhiya	17 July 1992 (aged 20)	(Bahrain Football Association) Al-Muharraq
5	MF	Hassan Jameel	7 October 1991 (aged 21)	(Bahrain Football Association) Riffa
6	DF	Dawood Saad	6 December 1982 (aged 30)	(Bahrain Football Association) Riffa
7	MF	Isa Moosa	19 December 1987 (aged 25)	(Bahrain Football Association) Manama Club
8	FW	Jaycee John Okwunwanne	8 October 1985 (aged 27)	(Qatar Football Association) Al Kharaitiyat
9	MF	Abdulwahab Al-Malood	21 July 1989 (aged 23)	(Bahrain Football Association) Al-Hidd
10	MF	Mohamed Salmeen	4 November 1980 (aged 32)	(Qatar Football Association) Al-Arabi
11	FW	Ismail Abdullatif	5 September 1986 (aged 26)	(Bahrain Football Association) Al-Muharraq
12	MF	Faouzi Aaish	27 February 1985 (aged 27)	(Qatar Football Association) Al-Sailiya
13	DF	Faisal Bodahoom	12 August 1983 (aged 29)	(Bahrain Football Association) Riffa
14	DF	Abdulwahab Al-Safi	12 August 1983 (aged 29)	(Saudi Arabian Football Federation) Al-Qadisiyah
15	MF	Abdullah Omar	1 January 1987 (aged 26)	(Saudi Arabian Football Federation) Al-Ittihad Jeddah
16	MF	Abdullah Yousef Helal	12 June 1993 (aged 19)	(Bahrain Football Association) East Riffa
17	DF	Hussain Ali Baba	11 February 1982 (aged 30)	(Kuwait Football Association) Kuwait SC
18	MF	Hussain Salman	20 December 1982 (aged 30)	(Bahrain Football Association) Al-Riffa
19	DF	Mohamed Duaij	24 July 1981 (aged 31)	(Bahrain Football Association) Riffa
20	FW	Sami Al-Husaini	29 September 1989 (aged 23)	(Bahrain Football Association) Al-Busaiteen
21	GK	Mohammed Al-Ogaimi	14 October 1983 (aged 29)	(Bahrain Football Association) Al-Shabab
22	GK	Abbas Ahmed Khamis	13 April 1987 (aged 25)	(Bahrain Football Association) Al-Ahli
23	DF	Rashed Al-Hooti	24 December 1989 (aged 23)	(Bahrain Football Association) East Riffa

=== Oman ===
Coach: (France) Paul Le Guen

No.	Pos.	Player	Date of birth (age)	Club
1	GK	Mazin Al-Kasbi	27 April 1993 (aged 19)	(Oman Football Association) Al-Seeb
2	DF	Mohammed Al-Maslami	20 April 1990 (aged 22)	(Oman Football Association) Al-Shabab
3	DF	Jaber Al-Owaisi	4 November 1989 (aged 23)	(Oman Football Association) Al-Shabab
4	MF	Ali Al-Jabri	29 January 1990 (aged 22)	(Oman Football Association) Al-Nahda
5	DF	Mohammed Al-Balushi	27 August 1989 (aged 23)	(Oman Football Association) Al-Nahda
6	MF	Raed Ibrahim Saleh	9 June 1992 (aged 20)	(Oman Football Association) Al-Oruba
7	FW	Hussain Al-Hadhri	May 21, 1990 (aged 22)	(Oman Football Association) Dhofar Club
8	MF	Eid Al-Farsi	31 January 1987 (aged 25)	(Oman Football Association) Al-Oruba
9	FW	Abdulaziz Al-Muqbali	23 April 1989 (aged 23)	(Oman Football Association) Sohar
10	MF	Fawzi Bashir	6 May 1984 (aged 28)	(United Arab Emirates Football Association) Al-Dhafra
11	DF	Saad Al-Mukhaini	6 September 1987 (aged 25)	(Oman Football Association) Dhofar Club
12	MF	Ahmed Mubarak Al-Mahaijri	23 February 1985 (aged 27)	(Saudi Arabian Football Federation) Al-Ittifaq
13	DF	Abdul Salam Al-Mukhaini	April 7, 1988 (aged 24)	(Saudi Arabian Football Federation) Al-Raed
14	FW	Abdullah Abdul-Hadi	April 25, 1992 (aged 20)	(Oman Football Association) Al-Oruba
15	FW	Ismail Sulaiman Al-Ajmi	9 June 1984 (aged 28)	(Saudi Arabian Football Federation) Al-Faisaly
16	FW	Yaqoob Abdul-Karim	September 4, 1985 (aged 27)	(Oman Football Association) Saham
17	DF	Hassan Mudhafar Al-Gheilani	26 June 1980 (aged 32)	(Oman Football Association) Dhofar Club
18	GK	Faiz Al-Rushaidi	19 July 1988 (aged 24)	(Oman Football Association) Al-Suwaiq
19	DF	Ali Salim Al-Nahar	August 21, 1992 (aged 20)	(Oman Football Association) Dhofar Club
20	FW	Imad Al-Hosni	18 July 1984 (aged 28)	(Saudi Arabian Football Federation) Al-Ahli
21	MF	Ahmed Hadid Al-Mukhaini	July 18, 1984 (aged 28)	(Qatar Football Association) El Jaish
22	GK	Hani Al-Sabti	February 27, 1984 (aged 28)	(Oman Football Association) Dhofar Club
23	FW	Juma Darwish Al-Mashari	29 September 1984 (aged 28)	(Oman Football Association) Dhofar Club

=== Qatar ===
Coach: (Brazil) Paulo Autuori

No.	Pos.	Player	Date of birth (age)	Club
1	GK	Qasem Burhan	15 December 1985 (aged 27)	(Qatar Football Association) Al-Gharrafa
2	DF	Abdelkarim Hassan	28 August 1993 (aged 19)	(Qatar Football Association) Al-Sadd
3	DF	Mohammed Kasola	13 August 1986 (aged 26)	(Qatar Football Association) Al-Sadd
4	MF	Lawrence Quaye	22 August 1984 (aged 28)	(Qatar Football Association) Al-Gharrafa
5	DF	Marcone	5 April 1978 (aged 34)	(Qatar Football Association) Al-Rayyan
6	DF	Bilal Mohammed	2 June 1986 (aged 26)	(Qatar Football Association) Al-Gharrafa
7	MF	Wesam Rizik	25 February 1981 (aged 31)	(Qatar Football Association) Al-Sadd
8	DF	Mesaad Al-Hamad	11 February 1986 (aged 26)	(Qatar Football Association) Al-Sadd
9	FW	Jaralla Al-Marri	3 April 1988 (aged 24)	(Qatar Football Association) Al-Rayyan
10	MF	Khalfan Ibrahim	18 February 1988 (aged 24)	(Qatar Football Association) Al-Sadd
11	FW	Hassan Al-Haydos	11 December 1989 (aged 23)	(Qatar Football Association) Al-Sadd
12	DF	Al-Mahdi Ali Mukhtar	2 March 1992 (aged 20)	(Qatar Football Association) Al-Sadd
13	DF	Ibrahim Majid	12 May 1990 (aged 22)	(Qatar Football Association) Al-Sadd
14	MF	Abdulaziz Hatem	28 October 1990 (aged 22)	(Qatar Football Association) Al-Arabi
15	MF	Talal Al-Bloushi	22 May 1986 (aged 26)	(Qatar Football Association) Al-Sadd
16	FW	Mohammed Razak	4 April 1986 (aged 26)	(Qatar Football Association) Qatar SC
17	MF	Younes Ali	3 January 1983 (aged 30)	(Qatar Football Association) Al-Rayyan
18	FW	Jeddo	27 January 1987 (age 39)	(Qatar Football Association) El Jaish
19	MF	Ali Afif	20 January 1988 (aged 24)	(Qatar Football Association) Al-Sadd
20	FW	Yusef Ahmed	24 October 1988 (aged 24)	(Qatar Football Association) Al-Sadd
21	GK	Rajab Hamza	16 October 1986 (aged 26)	(Qatar Football Association) Al-Arabi
22	GK	Baba Malick	3 September 1983 (age 43)	(Qatar Football Association) Lekhwiya
23	FW	Sebastián Soria	8 November 1983 (aged 29)	(Qatar Football Association) Lekhwiya

=== United Arab Emirates ===
Coach: Mahdi Ali

No.	Pos.	Player	Date of birth (age)	Club
1	GK	Ali Khasif	9 June 1987 (aged 25)	(United Arab Emirates Football Association) Al-Jazira
2	MF	Mohamed Fawzi	22 February 1990 (aged 22)	(United Arab Emirates Football Association) Baniyas
3	DF	Walid Abbas	11 June 1985 (aged 27)	(United Arab Emirates Football Association) Al-Shabab Al-Arabi
4	MF	Habib Fardan	11 November 1990 (aged 22)	(United Arab Emirates Football Association) Al-Nasr
5	MF	Amer Abdulrahman	3 July 1989 (aged 21)	(United Arab Emirates Football Association) Baniyas
6	DF	Mohanad Salem	1 March 1985 (aged 27)	(United Arab Emirates Football Association) Al-Ain
7	FW	Ali Mabkhout	5 October 1990 (aged 22)	(United Arab Emirates Football Association) Al-Jazira
8	DF	Hamdan Al-Kamali	2 May 1989 (aged 23)	(United Arab Emirates Football Association) Al-Wahda
9	MF	Abdulaziz Hussain	10 September 1990 (aged 22)	(United Arab Emirates Football Association) Al-Ahli
10	FW	Ismail Matar	7 April 1983 (aged 29)	(United Arab Emirates Football Association) Al-Wahda
11	FW	Ahmed Khalil	8 June 1991 (aged 21)	(United Arab Emirates Football Association) Al-Ahli
12	GK	Khalid Eisa	15 September 1989 (aged 23)	(United Arab Emirates Football Association) Al-Jazira
13	MF	Khamis Esmaeel	16 August 1989 (aged 23)	(United Arab Emirates Football Association) Al-Jazira
14	DF	Abdelaziz Sanqour	7 May 1989 (aged 23)	(United Arab Emirates Football Association) Al-Ahli
15	FW	Ismail Al Hammadi	1 July 1988 (aged 24)	(United Arab Emirates Football Association) Al-Ahli
16	MF	Haboush Saleh	1 January 1989 (aged 24)	(United Arab Emirates Football Association) Baniyas
17	MF	Majed Hassan	1 August 1992 (aged 20)	(United Arab Emirates Football Association) Al-Ahli
18	DF	Abdullah Mousa	23 February 1987 (aged 25)	(United Arab Emirates Football Association) Al-Jazira
19	MF	Ali Al-Amri	7 January 1989 (aged 23)	(United Arab Emirates Football Association) Al-Jazira
20	FW	Saeed Al-Kathiri	28 March 1988 (aged 24)	(United Arab Emirates Football Association) Al-Wahda
21	FW	Omar Abdulrahman	20 September 1991 (aged 21)	(United Arab Emirates Football Association) Al-Ain
22	GK	Dawoud Sulaiman	21 February 1990 (aged 22)	(United Arab Emirates Football Association) Al-Ain
23	DF	Mohamed Ahmed	16 April 1989 (aged 23)	(United Arab Emirates Football Association) Al-Ain

== Group B ==
=== Iraq ===
Coach: Hakeem Shaker

No.	Pos.	Player	Date of birth (age)	Club
1	GK	Jalal Hassan	18 May 1991 (aged 21)	(Iraq Football Association) Erbil
2	DF	Ahmad Ibrahim	25 February 1992 (aged 20)	(Iraq Football Association) Erbil
3	DF	Ali Bahjat	3 March 1992 (aged 20)	(Iraq Football Association) Duhok
4	MF	Khaldoun Ibrahim	16 June 1987 (aged 25)	(Iraq Football Association) Baghdad
5	DF	Mohammed Jabbar Rabat	23 November 1993 (aged 19)	(Iraq Football Association) Al-Minaa
6	DF	Ali Adnan	19 December 1993 (aged 19)	(Iraq Football Association) Baghdad
7	FW	Hammadi Ahmad	18 October 1989 (aged 23)	(Iraq Football Association) Al-Quwa Al-Jawiya
8	MF	Saif Salman	1 July 1993 (aged 19)	(Iraq Football Association) Duhok
9	MF	Ahmed Yasin	22 April 1991 (aged 21)	(Swedish Football Association) Örebro SK
10	FW	Younis Mahmoud (c)	3 February 1983 (aged 29)	(Qatar Football Association) Al-Wakrah
11	MF	Humam Tariq	10 February 1996 (aged 16)	(Iraq Football Association) Al-Quwa Al-Jawiya
12	GK	Mohammed Hameed	24 January 1993 (aged 19)	(Iraq Football Association) Al-Shorta
13	MF	Nabeel Sabah	1 July 1990 (aged 22)	(Iraq Football Association) Erbil
14	DF	Salam Shakir	31 July 1986 (aged 26)	(Qatar Football Association) Al-Khor
15	DF	Ali Rehema	8 August 1985 (aged 27)	(Qatar Football Association) Al-Wakrah
16	FW	Mohannad Abdul-Raheem	22 September 1993 (aged 19)	(Iraq Football Association) Duhok
17	MF	Alaa Abdul-Zahra	22 December 1987 (aged 25)	(Iraq Football Association) Duhok
18	FW	Hussam Ibrahim	10 May 1987 (aged 25)	(Iraq Football Association) Baghdad
19	DF	Mustafa Nadhim	30 November 1993 (aged 19)	(Iraq Football Association) Najaf
20	DF	Dhurgham Ismail	23 May 1994 (aged 18)	(Iraq Football Association) Al-Shorta
21	MF	Ahmad Abbas	9 May 1994 (aged 18)	(Iraq Football Association) Naft Al-Janoob
22	GK	Noor Sabri (Vice-captain)	18 June 1984 (aged 28)	(Iraq Football Association) Al-Naft
23	DF	Waleed Salem	5 January 1992 (aged 21)	(Iraq Football Association) Al-Shorta

=== Kuwait ===
Coach: (Serbia) Goran Tufegdžić

No.	Pos.	Player	Date of birth (age)	Club
1	GK	Abdulaziz Kamil		(Kuwait Football Association)
2	MF	Amer Al Fadhel	21 April 1988 (aged 24)	(Kuwait Football Association) Al-Qadsia
3	DF	Fahad Awadh	26 February 1985 (aged 27)	(Kuwait Football Association) Al-Kuwait
4	DF	Hussain Fadel	9 October 1984 (aged 28)	(Kuwait Football Association) Al-Qadsia
5	DF	Mohammad Rashed	1 July 1987 (aged 25)	(Kuwait Football Association) Al-Qadsia
6	DF	Mohammad Al-Rashedi	November 24, 1988 (aged 24)	(Kuwait Football Association) Sahel
7	MF	Fahad Al-Enezi	1 September 1988 (aged 24)	(Kuwait Football Association) Al-Kuwait
8	FW	Talal Nayef	30 November 1985 (aged 27)	(Kuwait Football Association) Al-Arabi
9	FW	Fahad Al-Rashidi	31 December 1984 (aged 28)	(Kuwait Football Association) Al-Arabi
10	MF	Abdulrahman Al-Shammari	13 February 1993 (aged 19)	(Kuwait Football Association) Al Naser
11	MF	Fahad Al-Ansari	25 February 1987 (age 39)	(Kuwait Football Association) Al-Qadsia
12	FW	Nasser Al Shaqqath		(Kuwait Football Association)
13	DF	Mesaed Al-Enezi	8 July 1983 (aged 29)	(Kuwait Football Association) Al-Qadsia
14	MF	Waleed Ali	3 November 1980 (aged 32)	(Kuwait Football Association) Al-Kuwait
15	MF	Hamad Aman	6 December 1989 (aged 23)	(Kuwait Football Association) Al-Qadsia
16	MF	Abdulaziz Al Salimi	19 September 1991 (aged 21)	(Kuwait Football Association) Al-Arabi
17	FW	Bader Al-Mutwa	10 January 1985 (aged 27)	(Kuwait Football Association) Al-Qadsia
18	MF	Abdulhadi Khamis	19 December 1990 (aged 22)	(Kuwait Football Association) Kuwait SC
19	MF	Ali Maqseed	11 December 1986 (aged 26)	(Kuwait Football Association) Al-Arabi
20	FW	Yousef Nasser	9 October 1990 (aged 22)	(Kuwait Football Association) Kazma
21	GK	Nawaf Al Khaldi	25 May 1981 (aged 31)	(Kuwait Football Association) Al-Qadsia
22	GK	Hameed Youssef	10 August 1987 (age 39)	(Kuwait Football Association) Al-Yarmouk
23	DF	Hussain Hakem	26 June 1984 (aged 28)	(Kuwait Football Association) Al-Kuwait

=== Saudi Arabia ===
Head coach: (Netherlands) Frank Rijkaard

No.	Pos.	Player	Date of birth (age)	Club
1	GK	Waleed Abdullah	19 April 1986 (aged 26)	(Saudi Arabian Football Federation) Al-Shabab
2	DF	Mansoor Al-Harbi	19 October 1987 (aged 25)	(Saudi Arabian Football Federation) Al-Ahli
3	DF	Osama Hawsawi	31 March 1984 (aged 28)	(Saudi Arabian Football Federation) Al-Ahli
4	DF	Bader Al-Nakhli	20 May 1988 (aged 24)	(Saudi Arabian Football Federation) Al-Fateh
5	DF	Osama Al-Muwallad	15 May 1984 (aged 28)	(Saudi Arabian Football Federation) Al-Ittihad
6	MF	Ahmed Otaif	14 April 1983 (aged 29)	(Saudi Arabian Football Federation) Al-Shabab
7	DF	Kamel Al-Mousa	29 August 1982 (aged 30)	(Saudi Arabian Football Federation) Al-Ahli
8	MF	Yahya Al-Shehri	26 June 1990 (aged 22)	(Saudi Arabian Football Federation) Al-Ettifaq
9	FW	Essa Al-Mehyani	22 June 1983 (aged 29)	(Saudi Arabian Football Federation) Al-Ahli
10	FW	Mohammad Al-Sahlawi	10 January 1987 (aged 25)	(Saudi Arabian Football Federation) Al-Nassr
11	FW	Nasser Al-Shamrani	23 November 1983 (aged 29)	(Saudi Arabian Football Federation) Al-Shabab
12	DF	Sultan Al-Bishi	28 January 1990 (aged 22)	(Saudi Arabian Football Federation) Al-Hilal
13	MF	Moataz Al-Musa	7 April 1987 (aged 25)	(Saudi Arabian Football Federation) Al-Ahli
14	MF	Saud Kariri	8 July 1980 (aged 32)	(Saudi Arabian Football Federation) Al-Ittihad
15	MF	Salman Al-Faraj	1 August 1989 (aged 23)	(Saudi Arabian Football Federation) Al-Hilal
16	MF	Ibrahim Ghaleb	28 September 1990 (aged 22)	(Saudi Arabian Football Federation) Al-Nassr
17	MF	Taisir Al-Jassim	25 July 1984 (aged 28)	(Saudi Arabian Football Federation) Al-Ahli
18	MF	Salem Al-Dawsari	19 August 1991 (aged 21)	(Saudi Arabian Football Federation) Al-Hilal
19	MF	Fahad Al-Muwallad	14 September 1994 (aged 18)	(Saudi Arabian Football Federation) Al-Ittihad
20	FW	Yasser Al-Qahtani	10 October 1982 (aged 30)	(Saudi Arabian Football Federation) Al-Hilal
21	GK	Abdullah Al-Owaishir	13 May 1991 (aged 21)	(Saudi Arabian Football Federation) Al-Fateh
22	GK	Khalid Sharahili	3 February 1987 (aged 25)	(Saudi Arabian Football Federation) Al-Hilal
23	MF	Housain Al-Mogahwi	24 March 1988 (aged 24)	(Saudi Arabian Football Federation) Al-Fateh

=== Yemen ===
Coach: (Belgium) Tom Saintfiet

No.	Pos.	Player	Date of birth (age)	Club
1	GK	Mohammed Ibrahim Ayyash	6 March 1986 (aged 26)	(Yemen Football Association) Al-Hilal
2	DF	Mudir Abdurabu	30 November 1989 (aged 23)	(Yemen Football Association) Al-Ahli
3	DF	Mohammed Fuad Omar	13 March 1989 (aged 23)	(Yemen Football Association) Shaab Ibb SCC
4	DF	Ahmed Sadeq El-Khamri	28 December 1992 (aged 20)	(Iraq Football Association) Al-Minaa
5	DF	Nateeq Hizam	1990	(Yemen Football Association) Al-Tilal
6	DF	Abdulaziz Al-Gumaei	8 January 1990 (aged 22)	(Yemen Football Association) Al-Ahli
7	MF	Najib Al Haddad	2 March 1990 (aged 22)	(Yemen Football Association) Shaab Ibb SCC
8	FW	Wahid Al Khyat	1 January 1986 (aged 27)	(Yemen Football Association) Al-Ahli
9	MF	Ala Al-Sasi	2 July 1987 (aged 25)	(Iraq Football Association) Almina'a
10	FW	Ayman Al Hagri	3 February 1993 (aged 19)	(Bahrain Football Association) Al-Najma
11	MF	Munassar Ba Haj	1 January 1990 (aged 23)	(Yemen Football Association) Al-Hilal
12	DF	Ahmed Al-Dhaheri	25 November 1993 (aged 19)	(Yemen Football Association) Al-Oruba
13	MF	Akram Al Selwi	8 September 1986 (aged 26)	(Yemen Football Association) Al-Hilal
14	FW	Ahmed Al Zahira	8 September 1986 (age 40)	(Yemen Football Association)
16	DF	Khaled Baleid	2 November 1986 (age 39)	(Yemen Football Association) Al-Tilal
17	FW	Kameel Tareq	1 January 1986 (age 40)	(Yemen Football Association) Al-Shula
19	DF	Mohammed Boqshan	10 March 1994 (aged 18)	(Yemen Football Association) Al-Tilal
22	GK	Salem Saeed	1 January 1984 (age 42)	(Oman Football Association) Al-Musna'a
23	GK	Saoud Al-Sowadi	10 April 1988 (aged 24)	(Yemen Football Association) Al-Wahda
24	DF	Ahmed Al Sadek	1 January 1983 (age 43)	(Yemen Football Association) Al-Shula
