= Yemen at the AFC Asian Cup =

National football delegation

Although being part of the Middle East, which is often known for its success in Asian football, Yemen is not considered as a very successful team compared to their neighbors. Despite having youth teams participate in big tournaments, notably their under-17 team who played in one FIFA U-17 World Cup, Yemen has remained under the shadow of other Arab teams, often failing to qualify for major tournaments. Since the Yemeni Civil War erupted in 2015, Yemen has been unable to play at their home ground. Against all odds, Yemen managed history and become the last Arab team in the Middle East to qualify for the AFC Asian Cup. They made their tournament debut in 2019.

== Asian Cup performance ==
AFC Asian Cup record									Qualification record					
Year	Result	Position	Pld	W	D	L	GF	GA	Pld	W	D*	L	GF	GA
as North Yemen
(Singapore) 1984	Did not qualify								4	0	0	4	2	18
(Qatar) 1988	Did not qualify								5	1	3	1	5	5
as Yemen
(Japan) 1992	Did not enter								Did not enter					
(United Arab Emirates) 1996	Did not qualify								4	1	0	3	2	8
(Lebanon) 2000	Did not qualify								4	2	0	2	14	5
(China) 2004	Did not qualify								6	2	1	3	15	15
(Indonesia) (Malaysia) (Thailand) (Vietnam) 2007	Did not qualify								6	2	0	4	5	13
(Qatar) 2011	Did not qualify								6	2	1	3	7	9
(Australia) 2015	Did not qualify								6	0	0	6	3	18
(United Arab Emirates) 2019	Group stage	23rd	3	0	0	3	0	10	18	6	5	7	16	23
(Qatar) 2023	Did not qualify								11	1	3	7	6	25
(Saudi Arabia) 2027	Qualified								14	6	5	3	29	11
Total	Group stage	2/12	3	0	0	3	0	10	84	23	18	43	104	150

== 2019 Asian Cup ==
=== Group D ===
Pos	Team	Pld	W	D	L	GF	GA	GD	Pts	Qualification
1	Iran	3	2	1	0	7	0	+7	7	Advance to knockout stage
2	Iraq	3	2	1	0	6	2	+4	7	Advance to knockout stage
3	Vietnam	3	1	0	2	4	5	−1	3	Advance to knockout stage
4	Yemen	3	0	0	3	0	10	−10	0	

Source: AFC
7 January 2019
20:00

Iran	5–0	Yemen
Taremi 12', 25'; Dejagah 23'; Azmoun 53'; Ghoddos 78'	Report

Mohammed bin Zayed Stadium, Abu Dhabi
Attendance: 5,301
Referee: Ryuji Sato (Japan)

12 January 2019
17:30

Yemen	0–3	Iraq
	Report	M. Ali 11'; Resan 19'; Abbas 90+1'

Sharjah Stadium, Sharjah
Attendance: 9,757
Referee: Fu Ming (China PR)

16 January 2019
20:00

Vietnam	2–0	Yemen
Nguyễn Quang Hải 38'; Quế Ngọc Hải 64' (pen.)	Report

Hazza bin Zayed Stadium, Al Ain
Attendance: 8,237
Referee: Ahmed Al-Kaf (Oman)

== 2027 Asian Cup ==
=== Group E ===
Pos	Team	Pld	W	D	L	GF	GA	GD	Pts	Qualification
1	South Korea	0	0	0	0	0	0	0	0	Advance to knockout stage
2	United Arab Emirates	0	0	0	0	0	0	0	0	Advance to knockout stage
3	Vietnam	0	0	0	0	0	0	0	0	Possible knockout stage based on ranking
4	Yemen	0	0	0	0	0	0	0	0	

First match(es) will be played: January 2027. Source: AFC
