= Abdullah bin Khalifa Stadium =

Association football stadium in Doha, Qatar

- Duhail Stadium
- Interactive map of Abdullah bin Khalifa Stadium
- Full name: Abdullah bin Nasser bin Khalifa Stadium
- Location: Doha, Qatar
- Coordinates: 25°22′21.76″N 51°28′9.36″E
- Owner: Al Duhail SC
- Capacity: 10,221
- Record attendance: 9,105 (South Korea U23 vs Indonesia U23, 25 April 2024)

Construction
- Built: 2011–2013
- Opened: 15 February 2013

Tenant
- Al Duhail SC (2013–present)

The Abdullah bin Khalifa Stadium, formerly known as Duhail Stadium, is a football stadium in Doha, Qatar.

== History ==
The construction of the stadium started in 2011 and was completed by February 2013. The first phase was completed in May 2012. The stadium was officially inaugurated on 15 February 2013, with the first match being a Qatar Stars League fixture between the home team Lekhwiya and Al Khor.

The official capacity is 10,000 people and 25 gates facilitate spectators' access to the stadium. The stadium is located within the complex of the Internal Security Forces in the Duhail district of the capital Doha.

The stadium hosted nine matches for the 24th Arabian Gulf Cup and seven matches during the 2023 AFC Asian Cup.

== Recent tournament results ==
=== 24th Arabian Gulf Cup (2019) ===
Date	Time(QST)	Team #1	Result	Team #2	Round
26 November 2019		United Arab Emirates	3–0	Yemen	Group A
27 November 2019		Oman	0–0	Bahrain	Group B
27 November 2019		Saudi Arabia	1–3	Kuwait	Group B
30 November 2019		Kuwait	1–2	Oman	Group B
30 November 2019		Bahrain	0–2	Saudi Arabia	Group B
2 December 2019		Yemen	0–0	Iraq	Group A
2 December 2019		Oman	1–3	Saudi Arabia	Group B
5 December 2019		Iraq	2–2	Bahrain	Semifinals
8 December 2019		Bahrain	1–0	Saudi Arabia	Final

=== 2023 AFC Asian Cup ===
On 5 April 2023, the Abdullah bin Khalifa Stadium was chosen as one of the eight (then nine) venues for the 2023 AFC Asian Cup. It hosted seven matches.

Date	Time	Team No. 1	Result	Team No. 2	Round	Attendance
13 January 2024	17:30	China	0–0	Tajikistan	Group A	4,001
16 January 2024	17:30	Thailand	2–0	Kyrgyzstan	Group F	4,530
19 January 2024	17:30	Vietnam	0–1	Indonesia	Group D	7,253
21 January 2024	17:30	Oman	0–0	Thailand	Group F	6,340
23 January 2024	18:00	Hong Kong	0–3	Palestine	Group C	6,568
25 January 2024	18:00	Kyrgyzstan	1–1	Oman	Group F	6,231
31 January 2024	19:00	Iran	1–1 (a.e.t.) (5–3 p)	Syria	Round of 16	8,720

=== 2024 AFC U-23 Asian Cup ===
The Abdullah bin Khalifa Stadium was chosen as one of the four venues for the 2024 AFC U-23 Asian Cup.

Date	Time	Team No. 1	Result	Team No. 2	Round	Attendance
15 April 2024	16:00	Australia	0–0	Jordan	Group A	1,356
16 April 2024	18:30	South Korea	1–0	United Arab Emirates	Group B	378
18 April 2024	16:00	Indonesia	1–0	Australia	Group A	2,925
19 April 2024	16:00	China	0–2	South Korea	Group B	1,398
21 April 2024	18:30	Jordan	1–4	Indonesia	Group A	5,632
22 April 2024	16:00	United Arab Emirates	1–2	China	Group B	2,411
25 April 2024	20:30	South Korea	2–2 (a.e.t.) (10–11 p)	Indonesia	Quarter-Final	9,105
29 April 2024	17:00	Indonesia	0–2	Uzbekistan	Semi-Final	8,972
2 May 2024	18:30	Iraq	2–1 (a.e.t.)	Indonesia	Third Place Play-off	8,090

== See also ==
- Lists of stadiums
- List of football stadiums in Qatar
