= Qatar football league system =

Interrelations of club association football leagues in Qatar

Qatar's football league system is a series of interconnected leagues for association football clubs in Qatar and consists of two divisions which are overseen by the Qatar Football Association (QFA). The Qatar Stars League, is the top division and currently features 12 teams, whereas the Qatari Second Division, also known as Qatargas League for sponsorship reasons, features a total of 8 teams.

Amateur leagues and tournaments are supervised and organized by the Subordinate Leagues Committee at QFA. These include the Qatar Amateur League, School League, University League and Asian Community Football Tournament.

Level	League
1	Qatar Stars League; 12 clubs
	↓↑ 1-2 clubs
2	Qatari Second Division; 8 clubs

According to the league's development strategy, starting with the 2022–23 season, the first-placed club of this league will play a relegation match against the tenth-placed club of the first league to decide which club will participate in the first league next season.
