= Thamer Enad =

Kuwaiti footballer and manager

Thamed Enad
Personal information
- Full name: Thamer Enad Al-Enazi
- Date of birth: 23 May 1970 (age 56)
- Place of birth: Kuwait
- Height: 1.70 m (5 ft 7 in)
- Position: Forward

Senior career*
| Years | Team | Apps | (Gls) |
| 1986–2000 | Al-Sulaibikhat | | |

International career
| 1992 | Kuwait U23 | | |

Managerial career
- 2003–2010: Al-Sulaibikhat
- 2013–2014: Al-Sulaibikhat
- 2016–2017: Al-Jahra
- 2019–2020: Kuwait
- 2021: Al-Salmiya
- 2021: Kuwait
- * Club domestic league appearances and goals

Thamer Enad Al-Enazi (Arabic: ثامر عناد العنزي; born 23 May 1970) is a Kuwait football manager.

== Playing career ==
During his player career, Enad played for Kuwaiti club Al-Sulaibikhat. He also competed in the men's tournament at the 1992 Summer Olympics.

== Managerial career ==
In 2003, after retiring from football, Enad re-joined Al-Sulaibikhat as manager. After leaving the club in 2010, Enad once again assumed managerial duties of the club for the 2013–14 Kuwaiti Premier League. In September 2019, Enad was appointed manager of Kuwait.
