= Hamed Al-Doseri =

Bahraini footballer

Personal information
- Full name: Hamad Mohamed Ebrahim Khalaf Al Doseri
- Date of birth: 24 July 1989 (age 37)
- Place of birth: Bahrain
- Position: Goalkeeper

Team information
- Current team: Al-Riffa
- Number: 21

Youth career
- –2006: Budaiya

Senior career*
Years	Team	Apps	(Gls)
2006–2007	Budaiya	20	(0)
2007–	Al-Riffa	60	(0)

International career^{‡}
2012–	Bahrain	2	(0)
- * Club domestic league appearances and goals as of January 2, 2015 ‡ National team caps and goals as of January 19, 2015

Hamed Al-Doseri (born 24 July 1989) is a Bahraini professional footballer who plays as a goalkeeper for Al-Riffa.
