= Ali Al-Jabri =

Omani footballer (born 1990)

Personal information
- Full name: Ali Hilal Saud Al-Jabri
- Date of birth: 29 January 1990 (age 36)
- Place of birth: Al-Buraimi, Oman
- Height: 1.75 m (5 ft 9 in)
- Position: Defensive midfielder

Team information
- Current team: Fanja
- Number: 4

Youth career
- 2005–2006: Al-Nahda

Senior career*
Years	Team	Apps	(Gls)
2006–2014	Al-Nahda	125	(1)
2014–	Fanja	8	(0)

International career
2011	Oman U-23	1	(0)
2011–	Oman	35	(0)
- * Club domestic league appearances and goals

Ali Hilal Saud Al-Jabri (Arabic: عَلِيّ هِلَال سُعُود الْجَابِرِيّ; born 29 January 1990), commonly known as Ali Al-Jabri, is an Omani footballer who plays for Fanja SC in Oman Professional League.

== Club career ==
On 6 July 2014, he signed a one-season contract with Fanja SC.

=== Club career statistics ===
Club	Season	Division	League		Cup		Continental (Note: Includes appearances in the AFC Cup)		Other		Total	
Club	Season	Division	Apps	Goals	Apps	Goals	Apps	Goals	Apps	Goals	Apps	Goals
Al-Nahda	2009–10	Oman Elite League	-	1	-	0	5	0	-	0	-	1
Al-Nahda	2012–13	Oman Elite League	-	0	-	1	0	0	-	0	-	1
Al-Nahda	Total		-	1	-	1	0	0	-	0	-	2
Career total			-	1	-	1	5	0	-	0	-	2

== International career ==
Ali is part of the first team squad of the Oman national football team. He was selected for the national team for the first time in 2011. He made his first appearance for Oman on 8 December 2012 against Lebanon in the 2012 WAFF Championship. He has made appearances in the 2012 WAFF Championship, the 2014 FIFA World Cup qualification, the 2015 AFC Asian Cup qualification and has represented the national team in the 20th Arabian Gulf Cup and the 21st Arabian Gulf Cup.

== Honours ==
=== Club ===
- With Al-Nahda
  - Oman Professional League (2): 2008–09, 2013–14
  - Sultan Qaboos Cup Runners-up: 2008, 2012, 2013
  - Oman Super Cup (1): 2009
- With Fanja

- Oman Professional League Cup (1): 2014-15

  - Oman Super Cup Runner-up: 2014
