= Ahmed Alos =

Yemeni footballer

Personal information
- Full name: Ahmed Abdullah Alos
- Date of birth: 3 April 1994 (age 32)
- Place of birth: Yemen
- Height: 1.69 m (5 ft 6 1/2 in)
- Position: Striker

Team information
- Current team: Al-Wehda Aden

Senior career*
Years	Team	Apps	(Gls)
2013–	Al-Wehda Aden		

International career
2016–	Yemen	17	(0)
- * Club domestic league appearances and goals

Ahmed Alos (born April 3, 1994) is a Yemeni football striker who currently plays for Al-Wehda Aden.

== International career ==
His international debut came in 2016, at an AFC Asian Cup qualification match against Maldives. He was selected as part of the Yemeni squad at the 2019 AFC Asian Cup.
