= Ahmed Al-Haifi =

Yemeni footballer

Ahmed al-Haifi
Personal information
- Full name: Ahmed al-Haifi
- Date of birth: January 1, 1994 (age 32)
- Place of birth: Yemen
- Height: 1.82 m (5 ft 11 1/2 in)
- Position: Midfielder

Team information
- Current team: Al-Nahda

Senior career*
Years	Team	Apps	(Gls)
2010–2015	Al Yarmuk		
2015–2016	Dhofar		
2016–2018	Al-Ahli Sana'a		
2018–2019	Al-Kharaitiyat		
2019–	Al-Nahda		

International career
2013–2019	Yemen	42	(0)
- * Club domestic league appearances and goals

Ahmed Ali Al-Haifi (Arabic: أحمد علي الحيفي;born 1 January 1994), is a Yemeni footballer who plays for Al-Nahda in Oman Professional League.

== International career ==
Al-Haifi was selected to the Yemeni squad that played at the 2019 AFC Asian Cup in the United Arab Emirates.
