= Ahmed Dhabaan =

Yemeni footballer

Personal information
- Full name: Ahmed Nabil Hazaea Dhabaan
- Date of birth: 9 July 1994 (age 32)
- Place of birth: Sana'a, Yemen
- Height: 1.74 m (5 ft 8 1/2 in)
- Position: Attacking midfielder

Senior career*
Years	Team	Apps	(Gls)
2017–2018	Al-Yarmuk Al-Rawda		
2018–2019	Dibba Club		
2019	Al-Shamal		

International career
	Yemen	8	(0)
- * Club domestic league appearances and goals

Ahmed Dhabaan (born July 9, 1994) is a Yemeni footballer who plays as an attacking midfielder.

Dhabaan was selected as part of the Yemeni squad at the 2019 AFC Asian Cup.
