= Ammar Hamsan =

Yemeni footballer

Personal information
- Full name: Ammar Hussein Mousa Hamsan
- Date of birth: 5 November 1994 (age 31)
- Place of birth: Yemen
- Height: 1.81 m (5 ft 11 1/2 in)
- Position: Defender

Senior career*
Years	Team	Apps	(Gls)
2014–2018	Al-Shula		
2018	Al-Markhiya	7	(0)
2018–2019	Qatar	12	(0)

International career
2015–2016	Yemen U-23	3	
2015–	Yemen	20	(0)
- * Club domestic league appearances and goals

Ammar Hamsan (born 5 November 1994) is a Yemeni footballer who plays as a defender.

== International career ==
Hamsan made his international debut on October 13, 2015, during a FIFA World Cup qualification match against North Korea. He was part of the Yemeni squad that played at the 2019 AFC Asian Cup in the United Arab Emirates.
