= Mohamed Abdulwahab =

Bahraini footballer

Personal information
- Full name: Mohamed Abdulwahab Ahmed Shaban
- Date of birth: 13 November 1989 (age 36)
- Place of birth: Bahrain
- Position: Midfielder

International career^{‡}
Years	Team	Apps	(Gls)
2012–	Bahrain	18	(1)
- ‡ National team caps and goals as of 26 January 2024

Mohamed Abdulwahab Ahmed Shaban (born 13 November 1989) is a Bahraini professional football player who plays for the Bahraini national football team.

== Career ==
He debuted internationally on 4 August 2019 at the WAFF Championship in Iraq in a match against Jordan in a 0–1 victory.

He had recently last appeared at the 2022 FIFA World Cup qualifying match against Hong Kong in a 4–0 victory on 15 June 2021.

On 21 November 2021, Abdulwahab was included final-23 squad for the 2021 FIFA Arab Cup.

=== International goals ===
Scores and results list Bahrain's goal tally first.

No.	Date	Venue	Opponent	Score	Result	Competition
1.	12 October 2023	Al Muharraq Stadium, Arad, Bahrain	Kyrgyzstan	1–0	2–0	Friendly
