= Ali Hafeedh =

Yemeni footballer

Ali Abdullah Hafeedh
Personal information
- Full name: Ali Abdullah Hafeedh
- Date of birth: 21 February 1997 (age 29)
- Place of birth: Yemen
- Height: 1.70 m (5 ft 7 in)
- Position: Striker

Team information
- Current team: Al-Wehda Aden

Senior career*
Years	Team	Apps	(Gls)
2016–	Al-Wehda Aden		

International career
	Yemen	2	(0)
- * Club domestic league appearances and goals

Ali Abdullah Hafeedh (Arabic: علي عبدالله حفيظ; born 21 February 1997) is a Yemeni footballer who plays as a forward. His club is Al-Wehda Aden.

== International career ==
Hafeedh was part of the Yemeni squad at the 2019 AFC Asian Cup in the United Arab Emirates.
