= Redha Abujabarah =

Kuwaiti footballer (born 1996)

Personal information
- Full name: Redha Hani Wael Abu Jabarah
- Date of birth: 27 October 1996 (age 30)
- Place of birth: Kuwait
- Position: Midfielder

Team information
- Current team: Kuwait SC
- Number: 4

Senior career*
Years	Team	Apps	(Gls)
2014–2021	Qadsia		
2021–2022	Kazma SC		
2022–	Kuwait SC		

International career^{‡}
2017–	Kuwait	48	(1)
- * Club domestic league appearances and goals ‡ National team caps and goals as of 23 March 2020

Redha Hani Wael Abu Jabarah (born 27 October 1996) is a Kuwaiti football player who plays for Kuwait SC and the Kuwait national team.

On 5 September 2019, Abujabarrah scored his first goal for Kuwait at the 2022 FIFA World Cup qualification against Nepal in a 7–0 victory.

== International career ==
=== Goals ===
No.	Date	Venue	Opponent	Score	Result	Competition
1.	5 September 2019	Al Kuwait Sports Club Stadium, Kuwait City	Nepal	6–0	7–0	2022 World Cup qualifiers

== Honours ==
Al-Kuwait

- AFC Challenge League: 2025-2026
