= Ahmed Nabeel =

Bahraini footballer

Personal information
- Full name: Ahmed Nabeel Ahmed Ali Naser Ghailan
- Date of birth: 25 August 1995 (age 31)
- Place of birth: Manama, Bahrain
- Height: 1.83 m (6 ft 0 in)
- Position: Defender

International career
Years	Team	Apps	(Gls)
2019–2024	Bahrain	11	(0)

Ahmed Nabeel Ahmed Ali Naser Ghailan (Arabic: أَحْمَد نَبِيل أَحْمَد عَلِيّ نَاصِر غَيْلَان; born 25 August 1995), is a Bahraini professional footballer who plays as a defender for the Bahraini national team.

== International career ==
Nabeel debuted internationally on 4 August 2019 at the WAFF Championship in Iraq in a match against Jordan in a 1–0 victory.

He appeared at the 2022 FIFA World Cup qualifying match against Iran in a 3–0 defeat on 7 June 2021.

On 21 November 2021, Nabeel was included final-23 squad for the 2021 FIFA Arab Cup.
