= Mohammed Ayash =

Yemeni football player

Personal information
- Full name: Mohammed Ebrahim Ali Ayash
- Date of birth: 6 March 1986 (age 40)
- Place of birth: Yemen
- Height: 1.78 m (5 ft 10 in)
- Position: Goalkeeper

Team information
- Current team: Peshmerga

Senior career*
Years	Team	Apps	(Gls)
2008–2014	Al-Hilal Al-Sahili		
2014–2015	Al-Suwaiq		
2015–2018	Al-Hilal Al-Sahili		
2018–	Peshmerga		

International career
2003	Yemen U17	21	(0)
2007–2021	Yemen	44	(0)
- * Club domestic league appearances and goals

Mohammed Ebrahim Ali Ayash (born 6 March 1986) is a Yemeni footballer who plays as a goalkeeper for Peshmerga.

== International career ==
He debuted for the Yemeni under-17 national team, appearing in the 2003 FIFA U-17 World Championship in Finland.

In 2019 he participated at the AFC Asian Cup Finals.
