= Hussein Al-Ghazi =

Yemeni footballer

Personal information
- Full name: Hussein Ahmed Al-Ghazi
- Date of birth: 7 May 1990 (age 36)
- Place of birth: Yemen
- Height: 1.75 m (5 ft 9 in)
- Position: Midfielder

Youth career
- 2009–2011: Ahli Taizz

Senior career*
Years	Team	Apps	(Gls)
2006	Ahli Taizz		
2006–2007	Al-Shula		
2007–2008	Al-Saqr		
2008–2011	Al-Tilal		
2011–2013	Al-Oruba		
2013–2017	Al-Saqr		
2017–2018	Al-Bahri		
2018–2019	Al-Wakrah		

International career
2010–	Yemen	35	(0)
- * Club domestic league appearances and goals

Hussein Al-Ghazi (born 7 May 1990) is a Yemeni footballer who plays as a midfielder.

== International career ==
He made his international debut on January 20, 2010, a 3–0 victory against Bahrain during the 2011 AFC Asian Cup qualification. He was selected to the Yemeni squad that played at the 2019 AFC Asian Cup.
