= Ala Addin Mahdi =

Yemeni footballer

Personal information
- Full name: Ala Addin Noman Abdullah Mahdi
- Date of birth: 1 January 1996 (age 30)
- Place of birth: Taiz, Yemen
- Height: 1.75 m (5 ft 9 in)
- Position: Left back

Team information
- Current team: Majees

Senior career*
Years	Team	Apps	(Gls)
2013–2014	Al-Ahli Taizz		
2014–2015	Shaab Ibb		
2015–2017	Al-Ahli Taizz		
2017–2019	Al-Rustaq		
2019–	Majees		

International career
2013–	Yemen	18	(0)
- * Club domestic league appearances and goals

Ala Addin Mahdi (born January 1, 1996) is a Yemeni footballer who plays as a left back for Omani club Majees.

== International career ==
Mahdi earned his first cap on the Yemen national football team during a 2013 AFC Asian Cup qualification match against Qatar, but did not play. He made his debut in 2015, at a World Cup qualification match against Philippines. He was selected for the Yemeni squad at the 2019 AFC Asian Cup.
