= Ahmed Al-Sarori =

Yemeni footballer (born 1998)

Personal information
- Full name: Ahmed Abdulhakim Ahmed Al-Hemyari
- Date of birth: 9 August 1998 (age 28)
- Place of birth: Sanaa, Yemen
- Height: 1.68 m (5 ft 6 in)
- Position: Forward

Team information
- Current team: Al-Naft
- Number: 77

Senior career*
Years	Team	Apps	(Gls)
2014–2016	Al-Ahli Sanaa		
2018	Central-PE	2	(0)
2019	Al-Markhiya		
2019–2020	Táborsko	6	(1)
2020–2022	Mohammédia	7	(0)
2022–24	Al-Quwa Al-Jawiya	2	(0)
2024-	Al-Naft SC	5	(0)

International career^{‡}
2014–2017	Yemen U19	2	(1)
2016–2022	Yemen U23	0	(0)
2015–	Yemen	51	(2)
- * Club domestic league appearances and goals as of 18 December 2024 ‡ National team caps and goals as of 23:41, 21 March 2024 (UTC)

Ahmed Abdulhakim Ahmed Al-Sarori (Arabic: أحمد عبدالحكيم أحمد السروري; born 9 August 1998) is a Yemeni footballer who plays as a forward for Iraq Stars League club Al-Naft and the Yemen national team.

He made history as the first Yemeni to play in Brazil, when he represented Central-PE in the lower division of Brazil.

== Career statistics ==
=== International ===
Scores and results list Yemen's goal tally first.

List of international goals scored by Ahmed Al-Sarori
No.	Date	Venue	Opponent	Score	Result	Competition
1.	12 November 2015	Rizal Memorial Stadium, Manila, Philippines	Philippines	1–0	1–0	2018 FIFA World Cup qualification
2.	17 November 2015	Grand Hamad Stadium, Doha, Qatar	Uzbekistan	1–3	1–3	2018 FIFA World Cup qualification
