= Salem Al-Harsh =

Yemeni footballer

Personal information
- Full name: Salem Gamal Mohammed Ali Al-Harsh
- Date of birth: October 7, 1998 (age 28)
- Place of birth: Aden, Yemen
- Height: 1.82 m (5 ft 11 1/2 in)
- Position: Goalkeeper

Team information
- Current team: Al-Wehda Aden

Senior career*
Years	Team	Apps	(Gls)
2018–	Al-Wehda Aden		

International career
2016	Yemen U-23		
2019–	Yemen	1	(0)
- * Club domestic league appearances and goals

Salem Gamal Mohammed Ali Al-Harsh (Arabic: سالم جمال محمد علي الهارش; born October 7, 1998) is a Yemeni professional footballer who plays as a goalkeeper for Yemeni club Al-Wehda Aden and the Yemen national team.

== International career ==
Al-Harsh was part of the Yemeni squad that played at the 2019 AFC Asian Cup.
