= Mohammed Ba Rowis =

Yemeni international footballer

Personal information
- Full name: Mohammed Abdullah Ali Ba Rowis
- Date of birth: 30 November 1985 (age 40)
- Height: 1.79 m (5 ft 10 in)
- Positions: Right midfielder; right back

Team information
- Current team: Al-Wehda Adan

Senior career*
Years	Team	Apps	(Gls)
2009–	Al-Wehda Adan		
2018	→ Umm Salal (loan)	1	(0)

International career^{‡}
2012–	Yemen	23	(2)
- * Club domestic league appearances and goals as of 11:57, 19 February 2019 (UTC) ‡ National team caps and goals as of 11:57, 19 February 2019 (UTC)

Mohammed Abdullah Ali Ba Rowis (born 30 November 1985) is a Yemeni international footballer who plays for Al-Wehda Adan as a right midfielder and right back.

== Career ==
Ba Rowis has played club football for Al-Wehda and Umm Salal.

He made his international debut for Yemen in 2012, and was a squad member at the 2019 AFC Asian Cup.
