= Amer Al-Fadhel =

Kuwaiti footballer

Amer Al Fadhel
Personal information
- Full name: Amer Maatouq Al Fadhel
- Date of birth: 21 April 1988 (age 38)
- Place of birth: Kuwait City, Kuwait
- Height: 1.75 m (5 ft 9 in)
- Position: Midfielder

Youth career
- 1997–2008: Al Qadsia

Senior career*
| Years | Team | Apps | (Gls) |
| 2007–2024 | Al Qadsia | | |
| 2022 | → Al Tadhmon SC (loan) | | |
| 2022–2024 | → Al-Fahaheel (loan) | | |

International career
| 2010–2019 | Kuwait | 50 | (0) |
- * Club domestic league appearances and goals

Amer Maatouq Al Fadhel (Arabic: عامر معتوق الفضل, born 21 April 1988) is a Kuwaiti former professional footballer who played as a midfielder for Kuwaiti Premier League club Al Qadsia.
