= Wahid Al Khyat =

Yemeni footballer

Personal information
- Full name: Wahid Mohammed Mohammed Al-Khyat
- Date of birth: 1 January 1986 (age 40)
- Height: 1.72 m (5 ft 8 in)
- Position: Midfielder

Team information
- Current team: Al-Ahli Club Sana'a

Senior career*
Years	Team	Apps	(Gls)
2006–2013	Al-Ahli Club Sana'a		
2013–2014	Yanqul		
2014–2015	Al-Ahli Club Sana'a		
2015	Al-Riyadh		
2015–2016	Al-Watani		
2016–	Al-Ahli Club Sana'a		

International career^{‡}
2011–	Yemen	33	(0)
- * Club domestic league appearances and goals as of 11:43, 19 February 2019 (UTC) ‡ National team caps and goals as of 11:43, 19 February 2019 (UTC)

Wahid Mohammed Mohammed Al-Khyat (born 1 January 1986) is a Yemeni international footballer who plays for Al-Ahli Club Sana'a as a midfielder.

== Career ==
Al-Khyat has played club football for Al-Ahli Club Sana'a and Al-Watani. He won the Yemeni League in 2007, and was a runner-up in 2013–14. He also won the Yemeni President Cup in 2008–09, and the Yemeni Super Cup in 2014–15.

He made his international debut for Yemen in 2011, and was a squad member at the 2019 AFC Asian Cup.

On 26 January 2015, Al-Riyadh has signed Alhassan for one seasons from Al-Ahli Club Sana'a.
