= Emad Mansoor =

Yemeni footballer

Personal information
- Full name: Emad Mansoor Ali Tawfiq
- Date of birth: 15 April 1992 (age 34)
- Place of birth: Hadhramaut, Yemen
- Height: 1.74 m (5 ft 9 in)
- Position: Striker

Team information
- Current team: Bidiyah

Senior career*
Years	Team	Apps	(Gls)
2009–2012	Salam Al Qarfa		
2012–2013	Taliat Taizz		
2013–2017	Al-Saqr		
2017–	Bidiyah		

International career
2014–	Yemen	15	(1)
- * Club domestic league appearances and goals

Emad Mansoor (born April 15, 1992) is a Yemeni football striker who currently plays for Bidiyah in Oman.

== International career ==
He made his international debut for Yemen national football team in 2014, during an AFC Asian Cup qualifying match against Malaysia. He was selected to the Yemeni squad at the 2019 AFC Asian Cup.

=== International goals ===
Scores and results list Yemen's goal tally first.

No.	Date	Venue	Opponent	Score	Result	Competition
1.	10 October 2017	Saoud bin Abdulrahman Stadium, Al Wakrah, Qatar	Philippines	1–0	1–1	2019 AFC Asian Cup qualification
2.	8 August 2019	Karbala Sports City, Karbala, Iraq	Lebanon	1–1	2–1	2019 WAFF Championship
