= Ahmed Abdulrab =

Yemeni footballer

Personal information
- Full name: Ahmed Saeed Salem Abdulrab
- Date of birth: 27 April 1994 (age 32)
- Place of birth: Yemen
- Height: 1.73 m (5 ft 8 in)
- Position: Midfielder

Team information
- Current team: That Ras

Senior career*
Years	Team	Apps	(Gls)
2011–2018	Al-Tilal		
2018–2019	Al-Wehda Aden		
2019–	That Ras		

International career
2017–	Yemen	10	(0)
- * Club domestic league appearances and goals

Ahmed Abdulrab (Arabic: أحمد سعيد عبد الرب)(born April 27, 1994) is a Yemeni football midfielder who currently plays for That Ras.

== International career ==
Abdulrab made his international debut in 2017, at an AFC Asian Cup qualification match against the Philippines.
