= Saoud Al-Sowadi =

Yemeni footballer

Saoud al-Sowadi
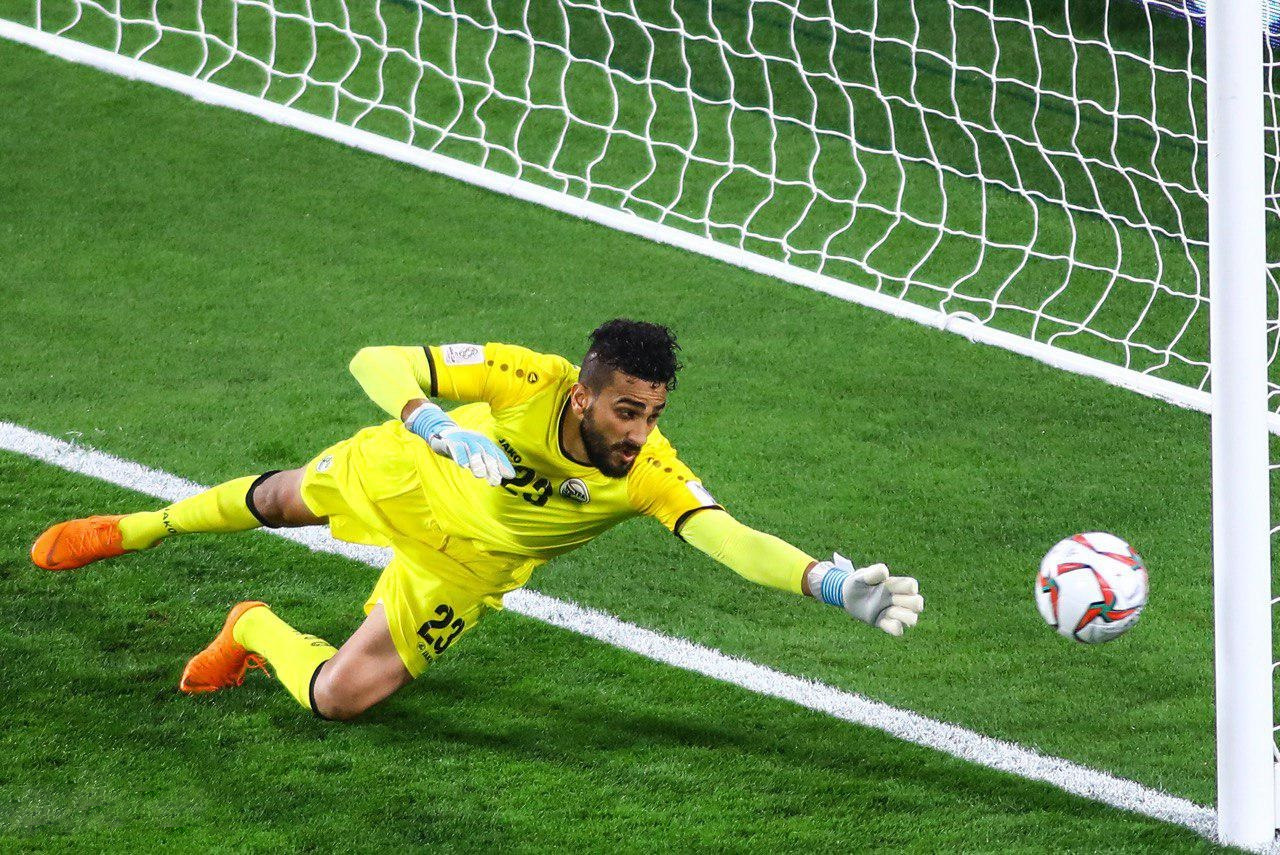
- Al-Sowadi making a save in the 2019 AFC Asian Cup.

Personal information
- Full name: Saoud Abdullah Abdullah al-Sowadi
- Date of birth: 10 April 1988 (age 38)
- Place of birth: Yemen
- Height: 1.85 m (6 ft 1 in)
- Position: Goalkeeper

Team information
- Current team: Al-Saqr
- Number: 22

Senior career*
Years	Team	Apps	(Gls)
2007–2011	Wehda Aden		
2011–2012	Al-Tilal		
2012–2013	Al Yarmuk		
2013–	Al-Saqr		

International career
2007–	Yemen	43	(0)
- * Club domestic league appearances and goals

Saoud al-Sowadi (born April 10, 1988) is a Yemeni football goalkeeper who currently plays for Al-Saqr.

== International career ==
Al-Sowadi was selected to the Yemeni squad for the 2019 AFC Asian Cup.
