= Abdulaziz Al-Gumaei =

Yemeni footballer

Personal information
- Full name: Abdulaziz Mohammed Ali Al-Gumaei
- Date of birth: 8 January 1990 (age 36)
- Place of birth: Yemen
- Height: 1.78 m (5 ft 10 in)
- Position: Defender

Senior career*
| Years | Team | Apps | (Gls) |
| 2008–2016 | Ahli Sana'a | | |
| 2016–2018 | Salalah | | |
| 2018 | Shabab Al-Ordon | | |
| 2018–2019 | Mesaimeer | | |

International career
| 2012– | Yemen | 20 | (0) |
- * Club domestic league appearances and goals

Abdulaziz Al-Gumaei (Arabic: عبد العزيز الجماعي)(born 8 January 1990) is a Yemeni footballer who plays as a defender.

== International career ==
He made his international debut for Yemen on December 12, 2012, in a match against Bahrain during the 2012 WAFF Championship and played 33 minutes in the 2019 AFC Asian Cup.
