= Mohammed Fuad Omar =

Yemeni football player

Personal information
- Full name: Mohammed Fuad Mohammed Omar
- Date of birth: 13 March 1989 (age 37)
- Place of birth: Yemen
- Height: 1.84 m (6 ft 0 in)
- Position: Defender

Senior career*
Years	Team	Apps	(Gls)
2008–2014	Shaab Ibb		
2014–2015	Al-Saqr		
2015–2018	Al Hala		
2018	Al-Ahli		
2018–2019	Muaither		

International career
2012–2019	Yemen	30	(4)
- * Club domestic league appearances and goals

Mohammed Fuad Omar (born 13 March 1989) is a Yemeni football player who plays as a defender.

He made his debut for the Yemeni national football team on December 9, 2012, in a match against Bahrain during the 2012 WAFF Championship.
