= Mudir Al-Radaei =

Yemeni footballer

Personal information
- Full name: Mudir Abdurrab Ali Al-Radaei
- Date of birth: 1 January 1993 (age 33)
- Place of birth: Sana'a, Yemen
- Height: 1.90 m (6 ft 3 in)
- Position: Defender

Team information
- Current team: Al-Ahli Club Sanaa
- Number: 4

Senior career*
Years	Team	Apps	(Gls)
2012–2015	Al-Ahli Sana'a		
2015–2017	East Riffa		
2017–2019	Al-Arabi	15	(2)
2019	→ Al-Wakra (loan)		
2020–	Al-Ahli Club Sanaa		

International career^{‡}
2012–	Yemen	63	(1)
- * Club domestic league appearances and goals as of 14:16, 11 July 2019 (UTC) ‡ National team caps and goals as of 14:16, 13 October 2023 (UTC)

Mudir Abdurrab Ali Al-Radaei (born 1 January 1993) is a Yemeni international footballer who plays as a defender for Al-Ahli Club Sanaa and the Yemen national team.

== International goals ==
Scores and results list Yemen's goal tally first.

No	Date	Venue	Opponent	Score	Result	Competition
1.	5 September 2017	Panaad Park and Stadium, Bacolod, Philippines	Philippines	1–0	2–2	2019 AFC Asian Cup qualification
