= Mohammed Boqshan =

Yemeni footballer

Personal information
- Full name: Mohammed Ahmed Ali Boqshan
- Date of birth: 10 March 1994 (age 32)
- Place of birth: Hadramout, Yemen
- Height: 1.73 m (5 ft 8 in)
- Position: Defender

Senior career*
Years	Team	Apps	(Gls)
2010–2011	Hassan Abyan		
2011–2014	Al-Tilal SC		
2014–2016	Al-Hilal Al-Sahili		
2016–2017	Al-Nahda		
2018	Al-Shamal		
2018–2019	Al-Khor		

International career
2012–2021	Yemen	37	(1)
- * Club domestic league appearances and goals

Mohammed Ahmed Ali Boqshan or Mohammed Boqshan (born 10 March 1994) is a Yemeni footballer who currently plays as a defender for the Yemen national football team.

== Career ==
Boqshan made his international debut for Yemen in 2012 against Saudi Arabia during the 2012 WAFF Championships group stage in a 1–0 loss. He scored his first international goal against Pakistan during the 2018 World Cup qualifiers in which Yemen ran out 3–1 winners.

=== International goals ===
Scores and results list Yemen's goal tally first.

#	Date	Venue	Opponent	Score	Result	Competition
1.	13 March 2015	Grand Hamad Stadium, Doha, Qatar	Pakistan	2–0	3–1	2018 FIFA World Cup qualification

== Honours ==
=== Club ===
Al-Tilal SC

- Yemeni Super Cup

(silver) Runners-up (1): 2011
