= 19th Arabian Gulf Cup squads =

This article lists the confirmed national football squads for the 19th Arabian Gulf Cup tournament held in Oman between January 4 and January 17, 2009.

Caps, goals and ages as of 4 January 2009.

== Group A ==
=== Bahrain ===
Head coach: (Czech Republic) Milan Máčala

| No. | Pos. | Player | Date of birth (age) | Caps | Goals | Club |
Goalkeepers
| | GK | Sayed Mohammed Jaffer | 25 August 1985 (aged 23) | 24 | 0 | (Bahrain Football Association) Al-Muharraq |
Defenders
| | DF | Salman Isa | 12 July 1977 (aged 31) | 94 | 16 | (Qatar Football Association) Al-Arabi |
| | DF | Sayed Mohamed Adnan | 5 February 1983 (aged 25) | 62 | 8 | (Qatar Football Association) Al-Khor |
| | DF | Hussain Ali Baba | 11 February 1982 (aged 26) | 49 | 2 | (Qatar Football Association) Umm Salal |
| | DF | Mohamed Husain | 18 July 1980 (aged 28) | 87 | 7 | (Kuwait Football Association) Al-Salmiya |
| | DF | Abdullah Omar | 1 January 1987 (aged 22) | 24 | 1 | (Bahrain Football Association) Al-Muharraq |
Midfielders
| | MF | Mohamed Salmeen | 4 November 1980 (aged 28) | 94 | 8 | (Bahrain Football Association) Al-Muharraq |
| | MF | Mohamed Hubail | 23 June 1981 (aged 27) | 53 | 5 | (Kuwait Football Association) Al-Arabi |
| | MF | Sayed Mahmood Jalal | 5 November 1980 (aged 28) | 91 | 6 | (Kuwait Football Association) Al-Salmiya |
| | MF | Faouzi Aaish | 27 February 1985 (aged 23) | 36 | 2 | (Bahrain Football Association) Al-Muharraq |
| | MF | Mahmood Abdulrahman | 22 November 1984 (aged 24) | 28 | 3 | (Bahrain Football Association) Al-Muharraq |
| | MF | Talal Yousef | 24 February 1975 (aged 33) | 93 | 27 | (Bahrain Football Association) Al-Riffa |
Strikers
| | FW | A'ala Hubail | 25 June 1982 (aged 26) | 71 | 26 | (Qatar Football Association) Umm Salal |
| | FW | Abdulla Baba Fatadi | 2 November 1985 (aged 23) | 19 | 4 | (Qatar Football Association) Al-Kharitiyath |
| | FW | Abdulla Yaser | 27 March 1988 (aged 20) | 3 | 0 | (Bahrain Football Association) Al-Riffa |
| | FW | Abdulla Al-Dakeel | 3 June 1985 (aged 23) | 17 | 4 | (United Arab Emirates Football Association) Al Wahda |
| | FW | Jaycee John Okwunwanne | 8 October 1985 (aged 23) | 17 | 6 | (Royal Belgian Football Association) Excelsior Mouscron |
| | FW | Ismail Abdullatif | 11 September 1986 (aged 22) | 26 | 2 | (Bahrain Football Association) Al-Hala |

=== Iraq ===
Coach: (Brazil) Jorvan Vieira

| No. | Pos. | Player | Date of birth (age) | Caps | Goals | Club |
Goalkeepers
| 1 | GK | Ali Mutashar | 11 June 1989 (aged 19) | 0 | 0 | (Iraq Football Association) Al-Naft |
| 21 | GK | Mohammed Gassid | 10 December 1986 (aged 22) | 4 | 0 | (Iraq Football Association) Al-Zawraa |
| 22 | GK | Noor Sabri | 18 June 1984 (aged 24) | 60 | 0 | (Iraq Football Association) Al-Talaba |
Defenders
| 2 | DF | Jassim Ghulam Al-Hamd | 11 March 1981 (aged 27) | 22 | 1 | (Jordan Football Association) Al-Baqa'a SC |
| 3 | DF | Bassim Abbas | 1 July 1982 (aged 26) | 57 | 2 | (Iraq Football Association) Al-Talaba |
| 4 | DF | Salam Shaker | 31 July 1986 (aged 22) | 6 | 0 | (Qatar Football Association) Al-Khor |
| 12 | DF | Saad Attiya | 26 February 1987 (aged 21) | 12 | 1 | (Sudan Football Association) Al-Merrikh |
| 14 | DF | Haidar Abdul-Amir | 2 November 1982 (aged 26) | 45 | 3 | (Jordan Football Association) Shabab Al-Ordon |
| 15 | DF | Ali Rehema | 8 August 1985 (aged 23) | 42 | 1 | (Qatar Football Association) Al-Wakra |
| 16 | DF | Khaldoun Ibrahim | 16 July 1987 (aged 21) | 12 | 0 | (Iraq Football Association) Erbil |
| 27 | DF | Ous Ibrahim | 1 January 1986 (aged 23) | 0 | 0 | (Iraq Football Association) Al-Zawraa |
Midfielders
| 5 | MF | Nashat Akram | 12 September 1984 (aged 24) | 73 | 10 | (Qatar Football Association) Al-Gharafa |
| 6 | MF | Salih Sadir | 21 August 1981 (aged 27) | 45 | 11 | (Lebanese Football Association) Al-Ahed |
| 11 | MF | Hawar Mulla Mohammed | 1 July 1981 (aged 27) | 67 | 15 | (Cyprus Football Association) Anorthosis FC |
| 13 | MF | Karrar Jassim | 11 June 1987 (aged 21) | 19 | 1 | (Qatar Football Association) Al-Wakra |
| 18 | MF | Mahdi Karim | 10 December 1983 (aged 25) | 61 | 9 | (Qatar Football Association) Al-Khor |
| 19 | MF | Haitham Kadhim | 21 July 1983 (aged 25) | 37 | 0 | (Football Federation Islamic Republic of Iran) Sepahan |
| 20 | MF | Samer Saeed | 1 July 1987 (aged 21) | 4 | 0 | (Libyan Football Federation) Al Ahly Tripoli |
| 23 | MF | Halgurd Mulla Mohammed | 1 July 1988 (aged 20) | 2 | 0 | (Iraq Football Association) Sulaymaniyah |
| 24 | MF | Qusay Munir | 12 April 1981 (aged 27) | 49 | 5 | (Qatar Football Association) Qatar SC |
| 25 | MF | Ahmad Abd Ali | 1 January 1986 (aged 23) | 15 | 0 | (Iraq Football Association) Erbil |
Strikers
| 7 | FW | Emad Mohammed | 24 July 1982 (aged 26) | 72 | 23 | (Football Federation Islamic Republic of Iran) Sepahan |
| 8 | FW | Mohammed Nasser | 12 March 1984 (aged 24) | 19 | 6 | (Football Federation Islamic Republic of Iran) Esteghlal Ahvaz |
| 9 | FW | Mustafa Karim | 21 July 1987 (aged 21) | 7 | 0 | (Egyptian Football Association) Ismaily SC |
| 10 | FW | Younis Mahmoud | 3 February 1983 (aged 25) | 66 | 27 | (Qatar Football Association) Al-Arabi |
| 17 | FW | Alaa Abdul-Zahra | 22 December 1987 (aged 21) | 7 | 0 | (Qatar Football Association) Al-Khor |

=== Kuwait ===
Head coach: (Kuwait) Mohammed Ebrahim Hajeyah

| No. | Pos. | Player | Date of birth (age) | Caps | Goals | Club |
Goalkeepers
| | GK | Nawaf Al-Khaldi | 25 May 1981 (aged 27) | 35 | 0 | (Kuwait Football Association) Qadsia |
Defenders
| | DF | Nohair Al-Shammari | 12 July 1976 (aged 32) | 96 | 3 | (Kuwait Football Association) Qadsia |
| | DF | Musaed Neda | 8 July 1983 (aged 25) | 46 | 6 | (Kuwait Football Association) Qadsia |
| | DF | Yaqoub Al Taher | 27 October 1983 (aged 25) | 49 | 0 | (Kuwait Football Association) Kuwait SC |
| | DF | Hussain Fadhel | 9 October 1984 (aged 24) | 7 | 0 | (Kuwait Football Association) Qadsia |
| | DF | Mohammad Rashed | 1 July 1987 (aged 21) | 11 | 0 | (Kuwait Football Association) Qadsia |
| | DF | Ali Maqseed | 11 December 1986 (aged 22) | 11 | 0 | (Kuwait Football Association) Al-Arabi |
Midfielders
| | MF | Mohamed Jarragh | 10 November 1981 (aged 27) | 53 | 2 | (Kuwait Football Association) Al-Arabi |
| | MF | Jarah Al Ateeqi | 15 October 1981 (aged 27) | 47 | 1 | (Kuwait Football Association) Kuwait SC |
| | MF | Saleh Al Sheikh | 29 May 1982 (aged 26) | 13 | 1 | (Kuwait Football Association) Qadsia |
| | MF | Talal Nayef | 10 November 1985 (aged 23) | 1 | 0 | (Kuwait Football Association) Al Nasr |
| | MF | Waleed Ali | 3 November 1980 (aged 28) | 57 | 4 | (Kuwait Football Association) Kuwait SC |
| | MF | Khaled Khalaf | 15 August 1983 (aged 25) | 11 | 0 | (Kuwait Football Association) Al-Arabi |
| | MF | Adel Humoud | 20 June 1986 (aged 22) | 7 | 0 | (Kuwait Football Association) Qadsia |
Strikers
| | FW | Bader Al-Mutawa | 10 January 1985 (aged 23) | 68 | 21 | (Kuwait Football Association) Qadsia |
| | FW | Ahmad Ajab | 13 May 1984 (aged 24) | 16 | 11 | (Saudi Arabian Football Federation) Al Shabab |
| | FW | Fahad Al-Rashidi | 31 December 1984 (aged 24) | 13 | 4 | (Kuwait Football Association) Al-Salmiya |

=== Oman ===
Head coach: (France) Claude Le Roy

| No. | Pos. | Player | Date of birth (age) | Caps | Goals | Club |
Goalkeepers
| 1 | GK | Sulaiman Al-Mazroui | 13 September 1972 (aged 36) | 46 | 0 | (Oman Football Association) Muscat Club |
| 22 | GK | Mohammed Huwaidi Al-Hooti | 27 January 1984 (aged 24) | 7 | 0 | (Oman Football Association) Muscat Club |
| 26 | GK | Ali Al-Habsi | 30 December 1981 (aged 27) | 67 | 0 | (The Football Association) Bolton Wanderers |
Defenders
| 2 | DF | Mohammed Rabia Al-Noobi | 10 May 1981 (aged 27) | 74 | 0 | (Qatar Football Association) Al-Sadd |
| 4 | DF | Said Al-Shoon | 28 August 1983 (aged 25) | 51 | 0 | (Kuwait Football Association) Kazma |
| 5 | DF | Mohammed Al-Balushi | 27 August 1989 (aged 19) | 15 | 0 | (Qatar Football Association) Al-Arabi |
| 11 | DF | Saad Al-Mukhaini | 6 September 1987 (aged 21) | 13 | 0 | (Oman Football Association) Al-Oruba Sur |
| 17 | DF | Hassan Mudhafar Al-Gheilani | 26 June 1980 (aged 28) | 66 | 5 | (Qatar Football Association) Al-Rayyan |
| 25 | DF | Khalifa Ayil Al-Noufali | 1 March 1984 (aged 24) | 63 | 8 | (Qatar Football Association) Al-Sadd |
| | DF | Abdulrahman Saleh Al-Alawi | 9 August 1986 (aged 22) | 0 | 0 | (Oman Football Association) Al-Taliya |
Midfielders
| 10 | MF | Fawzi Bashir | 6 May 1984 (aged 24) | 102 | 27 | (Kuwait Football Association) Kazma |
| 12 | MF | Ahmed Mubarak Al-Mahaijri | 23 February 1985 (aged 23) | 61 | 6 | (Qatar Football Association) Al-Sailiya |
| 16 | MF | Mohammed Mubarak Al-Hinai | 19 July 1984 (aged 24) | 44 | 6 | (Oman Football Association) Al Nasr |
| 19 | MF | Ahmed Manaa Al-Noobi | 9 April 1988 (aged 20) | 8 | 0 | (Oman Football Association) Dhofar |
| 21 | MF | Ahmed Hadid Al-Mukhaini | 18 July 1984 (aged 24) | 67 | 7 | (Saudi Arabian Football Federation) Al-Ittihad |
| | MF | Eid Al-Farsi | 31 January 1987 (aged 21) | 0 | 0 | (Oman Football Association) Al-Oruba Sur |
| | MF | Mansoor Al-Nuaimi | 13 February 1989 (aged 19) | 3 | 0 | (Oman Football Association) Al-Nahda |
| | MF | Juma Darwish Al-Mashari | 29 September 1984 (aged 24) | 10 | 0 | (Oman Football Association) Al-Oruba Sur |
Strikers
| 7 | FW | Hussain Al-Hadhri | 21 May 1990 (aged 18) | 11 | 0 | (Oman Football Association) Dhofar |
| 8 | FW | Badr Al-Maimani | 16 July 1984 (aged 24) | 66 | 15 | (Qatar Football Association) Al-Sailiya |
| 9 | FW | Hashim Saleh | 15 October 1981 (aged 27) | 68 | 18 | (Oman Football Association) Al-Suwaiq |
| 14 | FW | Hassan Rabia | 1 February 1984 (aged 24) | 12 | 4 | (Oman Football Association) Al-Suwaiq |
| 20 | FW | Amad Al-Hosni | 18 July 1984 (aged 24) | 65 | 27 | (Qatar Football Association) Al-Rayyan |
| | FW | Ismail Al-Ajmi | 9 June 1984 (aged 24) | 44 | 10 | (Kuwait Football Association) Kuwait SC |

== Group B ==
=== Qatar ===
Head coach: (France) Bruno Metsu

| No. | Pos. | Player | Date of birth (age) | Caps | Goals | Club |
Goalkeepers
| 1 | GK | Mohamed Saqr | 17 May 1981 (aged 27) | 55 | 0 | (Qatar Football Association) Al-Sadd |
| 22 | GK | Qasem Burhan | 15 December 1985 (aged 23) | 6 | 0 | (Qatar Football Association) Al-Gharafa |
| 23 | GK | Rajab Hamza | 16 October 1986 (aged 22) | 6 | 0 | (Qatar Football Association) Al-Arabi |
Defenders
| 3 | DF | Bilal Mohammed | 2 June 1986 (aged 22) | 51 | 6 | (Qatar Football Association) Al-Gharafa |
| 6 | DF | Saad Al-Shammari | 6 August 1980 (aged 28) | 85 | 7 | (Qatar Football Association) Al-Gharafa |
| 13 | DF | Mustafa Abdullah | 2 January 1984 (aged 25) | 23 | 1 | (Qatar Football Association) Al-Rayyan |
| 19 | DF | Abdulrahman Mesbeh | 7 January 1984 (aged 24) | 14 | 0 | (Qatar Football Association) Al-Rayyan |
| 21 | DF | Abdullah Koni | 19 July 1979 (aged 29) | 60 | 4 | (Qatar Football Association) Al-Sadd |
| 24 | DF | Ibrahim Majid | 12 May 1990 (aged 18) | 19 | 1 | (Qatar Football Association) Al-Sadd |
| 25 | DF | Marcone | 5 April 1978 (aged 30) | 16 | 0 | (Qatar Football Association) Al-Gharafa |
| 28 | DF | Musa Haroon | 13 September 1986 (aged 22) | 1 | 0 | (Qatar Football Association) Al-Arabi |
| 30 | DF | Mesaad Al-Hamad | 11 February 1986 (aged 22) | 22 | 1 | (Qatar Football Association) Al-Sadd |
Midfielders
| 5 | MF | Majdi Siddiq | 3 September 1985 (aged 23) | 37 | 2 | (Qatar Football Association) Al-Rayyan |
| 9 | MF | Younes Ali Rahmati | 3 January 1983 (aged 26) | 21 | 1 | (Qatar Football Association) Al-Rayyan |
| 10 | MF | Abdurabb Al Yazeedi | 30 October 1988 (aged 20) | 2 | 0 | (Qatar Football Association) Al-Sadd |
| 11 | MF | Hassan Al Haidos | 12 December 1990 (aged 18) | 5 | 0 | (Qatar Football Association) Al-Sadd |
| 14 | MF | Khalfan Ibrahim | 18 February 1988 (aged 20) | 22 | 4 | (Qatar Football Association) Al-Sadd |
| 15 | MF | Talal Al-Bloushi | 22 May 1986 (aged 22) | 29 | 1 | (Qatar Football Association) Al-Sadd |
| 20 | MF | Adel Lamy | 13 November 1985 (aged 23) | 16 | 5 | (Qatar Football Association) Al-Rayyan |
| | MF | Hussein Yasser | 9 October 1984 (aged 24) | 46 | 7 | (Egyptian Football Association) Al Ahly |
Strikers
| 7 | FW | Yusef Ahmed | 14 October 1988 (aged 20) | 10 | 0 | (Qatar Football Association) Al-Sadd |
| 8 | FW | Ali Afif | 20 January 1988 (aged 20) | 16 | 1 | (Qatar Football Association) Al-Sadd |
| 12 | FW | Waleed Jassem | 2 August 1986 (aged 22) | 27 | 8 | (Qatar Football Association) Qatar SC |
| 17 | FW | Sayed Ali Bechir | 6 September 1982 (aged 26) | 62 | 20 | (Qatar Football Association) Al-Arabi |
| 18 | FW | Sebastián Soria | 8 November 1983 (aged 25) | 31 | 13 | (Qatar Football Association) Qatar SC |

=== Saudi Arabia ===
Head coach: (Saudi Arabia) Nasser Al-Johar

| No. | Pos. | Player | Date of birth (age) | Caps | Goals | Club |
Goalkeepers
| | GK | Waleed Abdullah | 19 April 1986 (aged 22) | 11 | 0 | (Saudi Arabian Football Federation) Al Shabab |
Defenders
| | DF | Osama Hawsawi | 31 March 1984 (aged 24) | 38 | 2 | (Saudi Arabian Football Federation) Al Hilal |
| | DF | Abdullah Shuhail | 22 January 1985 (aged 23) | 11 | 0 | (Saudi Arabian Football Federation) Al Shabab |
| | DF | Majed Al-Marshedi | 1 November 1984 (aged 24) | 3 | 0 | (Saudi Arabian Football Federation) Al Hilal |
| | DF | Abdullah Al-Zori | 13 August 1987 (aged 21) | 10 | 0 | (Saudi Arabian Football Federation) Al Hilal |
| | DF | Majed Al-Amri | 15 September 1985 (aged 23) | 2 | 0 | (Saudi Arabian Football Federation) Al Shabab |
| | DF | Redha Tukar | 29 November 1975 (aged 33) | 80 | 9 | (Saudi Arabian Football Federation) Al-Ittihad |
| | DF | Abdulatif Al-Ghanam | 16 July 1985 (aged 23) | 12 | 0 | (Saudi Arabian Football Federation) Al Hilal |
Midfielders
| | MF | Saud Kariri | 8 July 1980 (aged 28) | 87 | 5 | (Saudi Arabian Football Federation) Al-Ittihad |
| | MF | Abdoh Otaif | 2 April 1984 (aged 24) | 45 | 5 | (Saudi Arabian Football Federation) Al Shabab |
| | MF | Khaled Aziz | 14 July 1981 (aged 27) | 57 | 1 | (Saudi Arabian Football Federation) Al Hilal |
| | MF | Ahmed Al-Fraidi | 29 January 1988 (aged 20) | 9 | 2 | (Saudi Arabian Football Federation) Al Hilal |
| | MF | Ahmed Al-Mousa | 27 January 1981 (aged 27) | 19 | 2 | (Saudi Arabian Football Federation) Al Wehda |
| | MF | Taisir Al-Jassim | 1 January 1980 (aged 29) | 36 | 5 | (Saudi Arabian Football Federation) Al-Ahli |
| | MF | Ahmed Otaif | 14 April 1983 (aged 25) | 13 | 0 | (Saudi Arabian Football Federation) Al Shabab |
| | MF | Sultan Al-Nemri | 27 January 1986 (aged 22) | 4 | 0 | (Saudi Arabian Football Federation) Al-Ittihad |
Strikers
| | FW | Yasser Al-Qahtani | 10 October 1982 (aged 26) | 83 | 37 | (Saudi Arabian Football Federation) Al Hilal |
| | FW | Malek Mouath Al-Hawasawi | 10 August 1981 (aged 27) | 36 | 11 | (Saudi Arabian Football Federation) Al-Ahli |
| | FW | Nasser Al-Shamrani | 23 November 1983 (aged 25) | 17 | 1 | (Saudi Arabian Football Federation) Al Shabab |
| | FW | Hassan Al-Raheb | 7 April 1983 (aged 25) | 5 | 0 | (Saudi Arabian Football Federation) Al-Ahli |
| | FW | Naif Hazazi | 27 July 1988 (aged 20) | 5 | 3 | (Saudi Arabian Football Federation) Al-Ittihad |

=== United Arab Emirates ===
Head coach: (France) Dominique Bathenay

| No. | Pos. | Player | Date of birth (age) | Caps | Goals | Club. |
Goalkeepers
| | GK | Majed Naser | 1 April 1984 (aged 24) | 31 | 0 | (United Arab Emirates Football Association) Al Wasl |
Defenders
| | DF | Mohamed Qasim Al-Balooshi | 9 November 1981 (aged 27) | 58 | 0 | (United Arab Emirates Football Association) Al-Ahli |
| | DF | Haider Alo Ali | 25 December 1979 (aged 29) | 62 | 3 | (United Arab Emirates Football Association) Al Wahda |
| | DF | Mohammed Fayez | 6 October 1989 (aged 19) | 2 | 0 | (United Arab Emirates Football Association) Al Ain |
| | DF | Fares Juma Al Saadi | 30 December 1988 (aged 20) | 9 | 0 | (United Arab Emirates Football Association) Al Ain |
| | DF | Hamdan Al-Kamali | 2 May 1989 (aged 19) | 2 | 0 | (United Arab Emirates Football Association) Al Wahda |
Midfielders
| | MF | Abdulsalam Jumaa | 23 May 1977 (aged 31) | 84 | 7 | (United Arab Emirates Football Association) Al Jazira |
| | MF | Abdulrahim Jumaa | 23 May 1979 (aged 29) | 94 | 9 | (United Arab Emirates Football Association) Al Wahda |
| | MF | Mohammed Ibrahim Al-Bloushi | 22 June 1977 (aged 31) | 25 | 6 | (United Arab Emirates Football Association) Al-Nasr |
| | MF | Ahmed Mohammed Al Mahri | 10 June 1988 (aged 20) | 26 | 1 | (United Arab Emirates Football Association) Al Jazira |
| | MF | Ali Al-Wehaibi | 27 October 1983 (aged 25) | 15 | 0 | (United Arab Emirates Football Association) Al Ain |
Strikers
| | FW | Mohammad Omar | 11 November 1976 (aged 32) | 83 | 26 | (United Arab Emirates Football Association) Al-Nasr |
| | FW | Mohamed Al-Shehhi | 28 March 1988 (aged 20) | 25 | 4 | (United Arab Emirates Football Association) Al Wahda |
| | FW | Ismail Al Hammadi | 1 July 1988 (aged 20) | 14 | 2 | (United Arab Emirates Football Association) Al-Ahli |
| | FW | Ismail Matar | 7 April 1983 (aged 25) | 72 | 22 | (United Arab Emirates Football Association) Al Wahda |
| | FW | Mohammed Salem Al-Enazi | 22 November 1976 (aged 32) | 70 | 34 | (United Arab Emirates Football Association) Al-Nasr |

=== Yemen ===
Head coach: (Egypt) Mohsen Saleh

| No. | Pos. | Player | Date of birth (age) | Caps | Goals | Club |
Goalkeepers
| | GK | Salem Saeed | 1 January 1984 (aged 25) | 33 | 0 | (Oman Football Association) Al Nasr. |
| | GK | Saoud Al-Sowadi | 10 April 1988 (aged 20) | 5 | 0 | (Yemen Football Association) Al-Wehda |
Defenders
| | DF | Hamada Al-Wadi | 6 June 1985 (aged 23) | 30 | 0 | (Yemen Football Association) Al-Tilal |
| | DF | Awsam Al Sayed | 5 April 1987 (aged 21) | 14 | 1 | (Yemen Football Association) Hassan Abyan |
| | DF | Basem Al-Aqel | 1 December 1990 (aged 18) | 1 | 0 | (Yemen Football Association) Al-Saqr |
| | DF | Mohammed Saleh Salem Al-Zuraqi | 4 May 1983 (aged 25) | 19 | 2 | (Yemen Football Association) Al Hilal Al Sahili |
| | DF | Khaled Al-Tahesh | 1 January 1984 (aged 25) | 9 | 0 | (Yemen Football Association) Al-Saqr |
| | DF | Zaher Farid Al-Fadhli | 6 July 1986 (aged 22) | 15 | 0 | (Yemen Football Association) Hassan Abyan |
Midfielders
| | MF | Saleh Al-Shehri | 23 October 1983 (aged 25) | 29 | 3 | (Yemen Football Association) Al Hilal Al Sahili |
| | MF | Akram Al-Worafi | 12 November 1986 (aged 22) | 24 | 1 | (Yemen Football Association) Al-Shaab Ibb |
| | MF | Mohammed Ali Al-Ammari | 13 February 1986 (aged 22) | 5 | 0 | (Yemen Football Association) Al-Shaab Ibb |
| | MF | Alaa Al-Sasi | 2 July 1987 (aged 21) | 11 | 1 | (Yemen Football Association) Al-Ahli |
| | MF | Khaled Al-Arumi | 1 January 1984 (aged 25) | 4 | 0 | (Yemen Football Association) Al-Saqr |
| | MF | Abdo Al-Edresi | 16 February 1986 (aged 22) | 4 | 0 | (Yemen Football Association) Al-Ahli |
| | MF | Ali Awad Al-Omqi | 2 July 1982 (aged 26) | 42 | 6 | (Yemen Football Association) Al-Shaab Hadramaut |
| | MF | Haitham Thabit Al-Asbahi | 6 February 1986 (aged 22) | 5 | 1 | (Yemen Football Association) Al-Saqr |
Strikers
| | FW | Akram Al-Selwi | 8 September 1986 (aged 22) | 3 | 1 | (Yemen Football Association) Al Hilal Al Sahili |
| | FW | Ali Al-Nono | 7 June 1980 (aged 28) | 41 | 15 | (Yemen Football Association) Al-Ahli |
| | FW | Muath Assag Al-Ammari | 11 November 1990 (aged 18) | 3 | 1 | (Yemen Football Association) Al-Saqr |
| | FW | Yasser Basuhai | 27 March 1979 (aged 29) | 29 | 6 | (Yemen Football Association) Al Hilal Al Sahili |
| | FW | Tamer Mohammed Hanash | 3 January 1986 (aged 23) | 3 | 0 | (Yemen Football Association) Al Hilal Al Sahili |
