= 20th Arabian Gulf Cup squads =

Below are the squads for the 20th Arabian Gulf Cup in Yemen played in 2010. Caps and goals are correct prior to the tournament.

== Group A ==
=== Yemen ===
Coach: (Croatia) Srećko Juričić

No.	Pos.	Player	Date of birth (age)	Caps	Goals	Club
	GK	Salem Saeed	1 January 1984 (aged 26)	49	0	(Yemen Football Association) Al Hilal Al Sahili
	DF	Zaher Farid Al-Fadhli	6 July 1986 (aged 24)	32	0	(Yemen Football Association) Al-Tilal
	DF	Basem Al-Aqel	1 December 1990 (aged 19)	14	1	(Yemen Football Association) Al-Saqr
	DF	Aref Thabit Al-Dali	2 October 1987 (aged 23)	15	0	(Yemen Football Association) May 22 San'a
	DF	Awsam Al-Sayed	5 April 1987 (aged 23)	26	1	(Yemen Football Association) Hassan Abyan
	DF	Ahmed Sadeq Al Khamri	28 December 1992 (aged 17)	8	0	(Yemen Football Association) Al-Tilal
	MF	Khaled Baleid	2 November 1986 (aged 24)	20	2	(Yemen Football Association) Al-Tilal
	MF	Akram Al-Worafi	12 November 1986 (aged 24)	45	4	(Yemen Football Association) Al Hilal Al Sahili
	MF	Haitham Al-Asbahi	6 February 1986 (aged 24)	13	3	(Yemen Football Association) Al-Wehda
	MF	Alaa Al-Sasi	2 July 1987 (aged 23)	29	5	(Yemen Football Association) Al Hilal Al Sahili
	MF	Mohammed Ali Al-Ammari	13 February 1986 (aged 24)	22	0	(Yemen Football Association) Al-Sha'ab
	MF	Munassar Ba Haj	1 January 1990 (aged 20)	15	1	(Yemen Football Association) Al Hilal Al Sahili
	MF	Hesham Al-Asbahi	12 May 1991 (aged 19)	7	0	(Yemen Football Association) Al-Wehda
	MF	Abdul Ghani Al-Ghurabi	1 July 1978 (aged 32)	3	0	(Yemen Football Association) Shabab Al-Jeel
	FW	Ali Al-Nono	7 June 1980 (aged 30)	62	30	(Yemen Football Association) Ahli Sana'a
	FW	Akram Al-Selwi	8 September 1986 (aged 24)	8	2	(Yemen Football Association) Al Hilal Al Sahili
	FW	Mohammed Al Abidi	15 January 1987 (aged 23)	10	1	(Yemen Football Association) Al-Shabab al-Bayda

=== Kuwait ===
Coach: (Serbia) Goran Tufegdžić

No.	Pos.	Player	Date of birth (age)	Caps	Goals	Club
	GK	Nawaf Al-Khaldi	25 May 1981 (aged 29)	51	0	(Kuwait Football Association) Qadsia
	DF	Musaed Neda	8 July 1983 (aged 27)	70	11	(Kuwait Football Association) Qadsia
	DF	Mohammad Rashed	1 July 1987 (aged 23)	29	0	(Kuwait Football Association) Qadsia
	DF	Hussain Fadhel	9 October 1984 (aged 26)	23	0	(Kuwait Football Association) Qadsia
	DF	Amer Al-Fadhel	21 April 1988 (aged 22)	5	0	(Kuwait Football Association) Qadsia
	DF	Fahad Awadh	26 February 1985 (aged 25)	25	0	(Kuwait Football Association) Kuwait SC
	MF	Jarah Al Ateeqi	15 October 1981 (aged 29)	70	2	(Kuwait Football Association) Kuwait SC
	MF	Waleed Ali	3 November 1980 (aged 30)	74	4	(Kuwait Football Association) Kuwait SC
	MF	Talal Al-Amer	22 February 1987 (aged 23)	15	1	(Kuwait Football Association) Qadsia
	MF	Fahad Al Enezi	1 September 1988 (aged 22)	20	2	(Kuwait Football Association) Kazma
	MF	Aziz Mashaan	19 October 1988 (aged 22)	7	1	(Kuwait Football Association) Qadsia
	MF	Fahad Al Ansari	25 February 1987 (aged 23)	23	0	(Kuwait Football Association) Qadsia
	MF	Khaled Khalaf	15 August 1983 (aged 27)	32	4	(Kuwait Football Association) Al-Arabi
	MF	Saleh Al Sheikh	29 May 1982 (aged 28)	39	2	(Kuwait Football Association) Qadsia
	FW	Bader Al-Mutawa	10 January 1985 (aged 25)	91	32	(Kuwait Football Association) Qadsia
	FW	Yousef Nasser	9 October 1990 (aged 20)	16	9	(Kuwait Football Association) Kazma
	FW	Hamad Al-Enezi	5 October 1986 (aged 24)	23	3	(Kuwait Football Association) Qadsia

=== Qatar ===
Coach: (France) Bruno Metsu The squad was announced on 16 November 2010.

No.	Pos.	Player	Date of birth (age)	Caps	Goals	Club
1	GK	Qasem Burhan	15 December 1985 (aged 24)	18	0	(Qatar Football Association) Al-Gharrafa
3	DF	Mohammed Kasola	13 August 1986 (aged 24)	6	0	(Qatar Football Association) Al-Sadd
6	DF	Bilal Mohammed	2 June 1986 (aged 24)	67	6	(Qatar Football Association) Al-Gharrafa
7	MF	Wesam Rizik	25 February 1981 (aged 29)	65	7	(Qatar Football Association) Al-Sadd
8	DF	Mesaad Al-Hamad	11 February 1986 (aged 24)	38	1	(Qatar Football Association) Al-Sadd
15	MF	Talal Al-Bloushi	22 May 1986 (aged 24)	46	1	(Qatar Football Association) Al-Sadd
16	FW	Mohammed Razak	4 April 1986 (aged 24)	0	0	(Qatar Football Association) Lekhwiya
19	MF	Ali Afif	20 January 1988 (aged 22)	24	4	(Qatar Football Association) Al-Sadd
23	FW	Sebastián Soria	8 November 1983 (aged 27)	46	16	(Qatar Football Association) Qatar SC
22	GK	Saad Al-Sheeb	19 February 1990 (aged 20)	4	0	(Qatar Football Association) Al-Sadd
18	DF	Ibrahim Al-Ghanim	27 June 1983 (aged 27)	44	1	(Qatar Football Association) Al-Gharrafa
11	FW	Fábio César	24 February 1979 (aged 31)	26	8	(Qatar Football Association) Al-Rayyan
17	MF	Abdulaziz Al Sulaiti	11 June 1988 (aged 22)	2	0	(Qatar Football Association) Al-Arabi
10	FW	Hussein Yasser	19 January 1984 (aged 26)	56	7	(Egyptian Football Association) Zamalek
	MF	Mohammed Al Yazeedi	30 October 1988 (aged 22)	21	0	(Qatar Football Association) Al-Sadd
	MF	Majdi Siddiq	3 September 1985 (aged 25)	34	4	(Qatar Football Association) Al-Sadd
	DF	Hamed Shami	13 November 1984 (aged 26)	12	0	(Qatar Football Association) Al-Gharrafa
	DF	George Kwasi Semakor	6 January 1988 (aged 22)	4	0	(Qatar Football Association) Al-Gharrafa
	MF	Mirghani Al Zain	18 August 1978 (aged 32)	7	0	(Qatar Football Association) Al-Gharrafa
	GK	Omar Bari	18 July 1986 (aged 24)	1	0	(Qatar Football Association) Al-Rayyan
	DF	Musa Haroon	13 September 1986 (aged 24)	9	2	(Qatar Football Association) Al-Arabi
	MF	Mohammed Yasser	10 October 1982 (aged 28)	21	1	(Qatar Football Association) Al-Rayyan
	MF	Lawrence Quaye	22 August 1984 (aged 26)	1	0	(Qatar Football Association) Al-Gharrafa
	FW	Jaralla Al-Marri	3 April 1988 (aged 22)	3	0	(Qatar Football Association) Al-Rayyan
	DF	Hamid Ismail Khalifa	12 September 1987 (aged 23)	8	0	(Qatar Football Association) Al-Rayyan
	FW	Hassan Al-Haydos	11 December 1990 (aged 19)	20	0	(Qatar Football Association) Al-Sadd
	MF	Magid Mohamed	1 October 1985 (aged 25)	49	10	(Qatar Football Association) Al-Sailiya

=== Saudi Arabia ===
Coach: (Portugal) José Peseiro

No.	Pos.	Player	Date of birth (age)	Caps	Goals	Club
	GK	Assaf Al-Qarni	2 April 1984 (aged 26)	3	0	(Saudi Arabian Football Federation) Al Wehda
	DF	Osama Al-Muwallad	16 May 1984 (aged 26)	19	3	(Saudi Arabian Football Federation) Al-Ittihad
	DF	Abdulatif Al-Ghanam	16 July 1985 (aged 25)	21	1	(Saudi Arabian Football Federation) Al Hilal
	DF	Meshal Ahmed Al-Said	18 July 1983 (aged 27)	8	0	(Saudi Arabian Football Federation) Al-Ittihad
	DF	Rashed Al-Raheeb	3 February 1984 (aged 26)	6	0	(Saudi Arabian Football Federation) Al-Ettifaq
	DF	Mohamed Eid	3 May 1987 (aged 23)	3	0	(Saudi Arabian Football Federation) Al-Nassr
	DF	Kamel Al-Mousa	29 August 1982 (aged 28)	27	0	(Saudi Arabian Football Federation) Al-Ahli
	MF	Taisir Al-Jassim	25 July 1984 (aged 26)	52	6	(Saudi Arabian Football Federation) Al-Ahli
	MF	Sultan Al-Nemri	27 January 1986 (aged 24)	15	2	(Saudi Arabian Football Federation) Al-Ittihad
	MF	Ibrahim Ghaleb	16 May 1991 (aged 19)	4	0	(Saudi Arabian Football Federation) Al-Nassr
	MF	Ahmad Abbas	26 August 1984 (aged 26)	5	0	(Saudi Arabian Football Federation) Al-Nassr
	MF	Abdullaziz Al-Dawsari	11 October 1988 (aged 22)	3	0	(Saudi Arabian Football Federation) Al Hilal
	MF	Moataz Al-Musa	6 August 1987 (aged 23)	4	0	(Saudi Arabian Football Federation) Al-Ahli
	FW	Mohammad Al-Shalhoub	8 December 1980 (aged 29)	101	18	(Saudi Arabian Football Federation) Al Hilal
	FW	Muhannad Assiri	14 October 1986 (aged 24)	4	2	(Saudi Arabian Football Federation) Al Wehda
	FW	Ryan Belal	4 October 1988 (aged 22)	3	1	(Saudi Arabian Football Federation) Al-Nassr
	FW	Saleh Bashir	4 September 1982 (aged 28)	12	7	(Saudi Arabian Football Federation) Al-Ettifaq

== Group B ==
=== Oman ===
Coach: (France) Claude Le Roy

No.	Pos.	Player	Date of birth (age)	Caps	Goals	Club
	GK	Mohammed Huwaidi Al-Hooti	19 January 1986 (aged 24)	20	0	(Oman Football Association) Al-Orouba
	DF	Hassan Mudhafar Al-Gheilani	26 June 1980 (aged 30)	85	5	(Saudi Arabian Football Federation) Al-Ettifaq
	DF	Mohammed Rabia Al-Noobi	10 May 1981 (aged 29)	88	0	(Qatar Football Association) Al Ahli
	DF	Mohammed Al-Balushi	27 August 1989 (aged 21)	36	0	(United Arab Emirates Football Association) Al Wasl
	DF	Abdulrahman Saleh	8 September 1986 (aged 24)	9	0	(Oman Football Association) Al-Tali'aa
	DF	Saad Al-Mukhaini	6 September 1987 (aged 23)	18	0	(Oman Football Association) Al-Suwaiq
	MF	Fawzi Bashir	6 May 1984 (aged 26)	116	30	(United Arab Emirates Football Association) Baniyas Club
	MF	Ahmed Mubarak Al-Mahaijri	26 February 1985 (aged 25)	72	6	(Saudi Arabian Football Federation) Al Fateh
	MF	Ahmed Hadid Al-Mukhaini	18 July 1984 (aged 26)	76	8	(Saudi Arabian Football Federation) Al-Ittihad
	MF	Hussain Al-Hadhri	21 May 1990 (aged 20)	15	1	(Oman Football Association) Dhofar
	MF	Juma Darwish Al-Mashari	29 September 1984 (aged 26)	16	0	(Oman Football Association) Al-Orouba
	MF	Yaqoob Al-Qasmi	16 February 1990 (aged 20)	18	2	(Oman Football Association) Saham
	FW	Ismail Sulaiman Al Ajmi	9 June 1984 (aged 26)	60	11	(Kuwait Football Association) Kuwait SC
	FW	Amad Al-Hosni	18 July 1984 (aged 26)	78	32	(Saudi Arabian Football Federation) Al-Ahli
	FW	Hassan Rabia Al-Hosni	1 February 1984 (aged 26)	32	14	(Oman Football Association) Al-Suwaiq
	FW	Osama Hadid Al-Mukhaini	30 January 1987 (aged 23)	11	3	(Oman Football Association) Al-Tali'aa
	FW	Qasim Said	20 April 1989 (aged 21)	16	0	(Oman Football Association) Al Nasr

=== Iraq ===
Coach: (Germany) Wolfgang Sidka

No.	Pos.	Player	Date of birth (age)	Caps	Goals	Club
1	GK	Ali Mutashar	11 June 1989 (aged 21)	2	0	(Iraq Football Association) Al-Talaba
2	DF	Mohammed Ali Karim	25 June 1986 (aged 24)	19	0	(Iraq Football Association) Al-Shorta
3	DF	Bassim Abbas	1 July 1982 (aged 28)	65	1	(Turkish Football Federation) Konyaspor
4	DF	Fareed Majeed	10 April 1986 (aged 24)	10	0	(Football Federation Islamic Republic of Iran) Naft Tehran F.C.
5	MF	Nashat Akram	12 September 1984 (aged 26)	73	12	(Qatar Football Association) Al-Wakrah
6	MF	Salih Sadir	21 August 1981 (aged 29)	30	7	(Lebanese Football Association) Safa SC
7	FW	Emad Mohammed	24 July 1982 (aged 28)	59	23	(Egyptian Football Association) Zamalek SC
8	MF	Samer Saeed	1 July 1987 (aged 23)	12	0	(Libyan Football Federation) Al-Ahly Tripoli
9	FW	Mustafa Karim	21 July 1987 (aged 23)	21	4	(United Arab Emirates Football Association) Baniyas Club
10	FW	Younis Mahmoud (c)	3 February 1983 (aged 27)	57	30	(Qatar Football Association) Al-Gharafa
11	FW	Hawar Mulla Mohammed	1 June 1981 (aged 29)	77	16	(Iraq Football Association) Erbil
12	GK	Mohammed Gassid	10 December 1986 (aged 23)	20	0	(Iraq Football Association) Erbil
14	DF	Salam Shakir	31 July 1986 (aged 24)	19	0	(Qatar Football Association) Al-Khor
15	DF	Ali Rehema	8 August 1985 (aged 25)	57	1	(Qatar Football Association) Al-Wakrah
16	DF	Samal Saeed	7 January 1986 (aged 24)	25	2	(Iraq Football Association) Najaf
17	MF	Alaa Abdul-Zahra	22 December 1987 (aged 22)	19	2	(Qatar Football Association) Al-Kharaitiyat
18	FW	Mahdi Karim	10 December 1983 (aged 26)	70	11	(Iraq Football Association) Erbil
19	MF	Ahmed Ayad	1 January 1989 (aged 21)	7	0	(Iraq Football Association) Al-Quwa Al-Jawiya
20	MF	Muthana Khalid	14 June 1989 (aged 21)	7	0	(Iraq Football Association) Al-Quwa Al-Jawiya
24	MF	Qusay Munir	12 April 1981 (aged 29)	51	5	(Qatar Football Association) Qatar SC
25	MF	Saad Abdul-Amir	19 January 1992 (aged 18)	4	0	(Iraq Football Association) Al-Karkh
26	DF	Ahmed Ibrahim	25 February 1992 (aged 18)	1	0	(Iraq Football Association) Erbil
29	DF	Ous Ibrahim	1 January 1986 (aged 24)	9	0	(Iraq Football Association) Erbil

=== United Arab Emirates ===
Head coach: (Slovenia) Srečko Katanec

The squad was announced on 7 November 2010.

No.	Pos.	Player	Date of birth (age)	Caps	Goals	Club
	GK	Majed Nasser	1 April 1984 (aged 26)	47	0	(United Arab Emirates Football Association) Al Wasl
	DF	Khalid Sebil Lashkari	22 June 1987 (aged 23)	6	0	(United Arab Emirates Football Association) Al-Jazira
	MF	Subait Khater	27 February 1980 (aged 30)	69	10	(United Arab Emirates Football Association) Al-Jazira
	DF	Fares Juma	30 December 1988 (aged 21)	21	1	(United Arab Emirates Football Association) Al Ain
	FW	Ali Al-Wehaibi	27 October 1983 (aged 27)	28	2	(United Arab Emirates Football Association) Al Ain
	GK	Obaid Al-Taweela	26 August 1979 (aged 31)	6	0	(United Arab Emirates Football Association) Al-Ahli
	DF	Walid Abbas	11 June 1985 (aged 25)	13	0	(United Arab Emirates Football Association) Al-Shabab Al-Arabi
	FW	Ismail Al Hammadi	1 July 1988 (aged 22)	24	4	(United Arab Emirates Football Association) Al-Ahli
	MF	Amer Mubarak	27 December 1987 (aged 22)	24	2	(United Arab Emirates Football Association) Al-Nasr
	DF	Yousif Jaber	25 February 1985 (aged 25)	23	2	(United Arab Emirates Football Association) Baniyas
	FW	Saeed Al Kass (c)	20 February 1976 (aged 34)	28	14	(United Arab Emirates Football Association) Al Wasl
	FW	Mahir Jasem	22 January 1989 (aged 21)	1	1	(United Arab Emirates Football Association) Al Wasl
		Rashed Issa				(United Arab Emirates Football Association) Al Wasl
	FW	Ahmed Khamis	16 November 1985 (aged 25)	4	1	(United Arab Emirates Football Association) Al-Ahli
	GK	Mahmoud Almas	8 September 1983 (aged 27)			(United Arab Emirates Football Association) Al-Sharjah
	MF	Sultan Bargash	18 January 1989 (aged 21)	9	1	(United Arab Emirates Football Association) Al-Jazira
	FW	Ahmed Jumaa	2 January 1986 (aged 24)	1	1	(United Arab Emirates Football Association) Al-Jazira
	DF	Fawzi Fayez	14 July 1987 (aged 23)	4	0	(United Arab Emirates Football Association) Al Ain
	FW	Saif Mohammed	15 September 1983 (aged 27)	13	1	(United Arab Emirates Football Association) Al Ain
	MF	Mohammed Abdulrahman	4 February 1989 (aged 21)	3	0	(United Arab Emirates Football Association) Al Ain
	FW	Abdulaziz Fayez Al Alawi	17 June 1990 (aged 20)	0	0	(United Arab Emirates Football Association) Al Ain
	MF	Sultan Al Ghaferi	18 September 1986 (aged 24)	2	0	(United Arab Emirates Football Association) Baniyas SC
	DF	Musallem Fayez	26 March 1987 (aged 23)	1	0	(United Arab Emirates Football Association) Al Ain
	DF	Fahad Feraish	27 July 1985 (aged 25)	1	0	(United Arab Emirates Football Association) Baniyas
	FW	Ali Mabkhout	5 October 1990 (aged 20)	1	0	(United Arab Emirates Football Association) Al-Jazira

=== Bahrain ===
Coach: (Bahrain) Salman Sharida

No.	Pos.	Player	Date of birth (age)	Caps	Goals	Club
	GK	Abbas Ahmed Khamis	13 June 1983 (aged 27)	16	0	(Bahrain Football Association) Al Ahli
	DF	Abdulla Al-Marzooqi	12 December 1980 (aged 29)	76	9	(Qatar Football Association) Al-Sailiya
	DF	Salman Isa	12 July 1977 (aged 33)	101	20	(Qatar Football Association) Al-Arabi
	DF	Hussain Ali Baba	11 February 1982 (aged 28)	63	3	(Saudi Arabian Football Federation) Al Wehda
	DF	Abbas Ayyad	11 May 1987 (aged 23)	12	0	(Bahrain Football Association) Al Ahli
	DF	Rashed Al-Hooti	24 December 1989 (aged 20)	6	0	(Bahrain Football Association) East Riffa
	DF	Fahad Tariq Showaiter	9 October 1990 (aged 20)	0	0	(Bahrain Football Association) Al-Muharraq
	MF	Ebrahim Al-Mishkhas	7 July 1980 (aged 30)	21	1	(Bahrain Football Association) Al-Muharraq
	MF	Faouzi Aaish	27 February 1985 (aged 25)	47	7	(Qatar Football Association) Al-Sailiya
	MF	Abdulla Baba Fatadi	2 November 1985 (aged 25)	29	9	(United Arab Emirates Football Association) Al-Ittihad Kalba
	MF	Abdulwahab Al-Safi	6 April 1984 (aged 26)	13	0	(Bahrain Football Association) Al Ahli
	MF	Ahmed Hassan Taleb	29 March 1980 (aged 30)	22	5	(Bahrain Football Association) Manama Club
	MF	Hamad Rakea Al-Anezi	22 April 1984 (aged 26)	26	1	(Bahrain Football Association) Al-Riffa
	MF	Mahmood Al-Ajmi	8 May 1987 (aged 23)	4	0	(Bahrain Football Association) Al-Riffa
	FW	Ismail Abdullatif	11 September 1986 (aged 24)	35	17	(Bahrain Football Association) Al-Hala
	FW	Abdulla Al-Dakeel	3 June 1985 (aged 25)	33	6	(Bahrain Football Association) Al-Muharraq
