= Kuwait national football team results (2010–2019) =

This article provides details of international football games played by the Kuwait national football team from 2010 to 2019.

== Results ==
=== 2010 ===
6 January 2010 2011 AFC Asian Cup qualification	Kuwait	2–2	Australia	Kuwait City, Kuwait
17:30 UTC+3	Bandar 40'; Naser 44'	(Report)	Wilkshire 2'; Heffernan 4'	Stadium: Al Kuwait Sports Club Stadium; Attendance: 20,000; Referee: (Uzbekistan) Ravshan Irmatov

19 February 2010 Friendly	Kuwait	1–1	Syria	Abu Dhabi, UAE
--:-- UTC+3	Ajab 88'	Report	A. Al Hussain 81'	Stadium: Al-Nahyan Stadium

25 February 2010 Friendly	Kuwait	4–1	Bahrain
--:-- UTC+3

3 March 2010 2011 AFC Asian Cup qualification	Oman	0–0	Kuwait	Muscat, Oman
19:30 UTC+4		Report		Stadium: Sultan Qaboos Sports Complex, Muscat; Attendance: 27,000; Referee: (Iran) Masoud Moradi

11 August 2010 Friendly	Azerbaijan	1–1	Kuwait	Baku, Azerbaijan
--:-- UTC+4	Mammadow 42'		Al Mutwa 53'	Stadium: Tofik Bakhramov Stadium

3 September 2010 Friendly	Kuwait	3–0	Syria	Kuwait City, Kuwait
--:-- UTC+3	Kalaf 8'; Al-Mutwa 84'; Al Sulaiman 90'			Stadium: Al-Sadaqua Walsalam Stadium

7 September 2010 Friendly	United Arab Emirates	3–0	Kuwait	Abu Dhabi, United Arab Emirates
22:00 UTC+4	Khalil 22'; Sabeel 50'; Kuthairi 90+1'			Stadium: Al-Nahyan Stadium

26 September 2010 2010 WAFF	Syria	1–2	Kuwait	Amman, Jordan
22:00 UTC+3

28 September 2010 2010 WAFF	Kuwait	2–2	Jordan	Amman, Jordan
22:00 UTC+3

1 October 2010 2010 WAFF	Kuwait	1–1	Yemen	Amman, Jordan
21:00 UTC+3

3 October 2010 2010 WAFF	Iran	1–2	Kuwait	Amman, Jordan
21:00 UTC+3

8 October 2010 Friendly	Kuwait	1–3	Bahrain	Kuwait City, Kuwait
20:00 UTC+3	Ahmad Ajab 66'		Ismaeel Latif 9'; Fouzi Ayesh 47'; Salma Isa 51'	Stadium: Jaber Al-Ahmad International Stadium

12 October 2010 Friendly	Kuwait	3–1	Vietnam	Kuwait City, Kuwait
18:00 UTC+3	Khaled Ajab 68'; Yousef Nasser 79' 89'		Nguyễn Minh Phương 56'	Stadium: Jaber Al-Ahmad International Stadium

14 November 2010 Friendly	India	1–9	Kuwait	Abu Dhabi, United Arab Emirates
--:-- UTC+4	Rafi 69'			Stadium: Al-Nahyan Stadium

17 November 2010 Friendly	Iraq	1–1	Kuwait	Abu Dhabi, United Arab Emirates
--:-- UTC+3				Stadium: Al-Rashid Stadium

22 November 2010 2010 Gulf Cup	Kuwait	1–0	Qatar	Aden, Yemen
--:-- UTC+3				Stadium: May 22 Stadium

25 November 2010 2010 Gulf Cup	Saudi Arabia	0–0	Kuwait	Aden, Yemen
--:-- UTC+3				Stadium: Al-Wihda Stadium

28 November 2010 2010 Gulf Cup	Yemen	0–3	Kuwait	Aden, Yemen
--:-- UTC+3				Stadium: Al-Wihda Stadium

2 December 2010 2010 Gulf Cup	Kuwait	2–2 (a.e.t.)	Iraq	Aden, Yemen
--:-- UTC+3				Stadium: May 22 Stadium

5 December 2010 2010 Gulf Cup	Kuwait	1–0	Saudi Arabia	Aden, Yemen
--:-- UTC+3				Stadium: May 22 Stadium

24 December 2010 Friendly	Kuwait	2–1	North Korea
--:-- UTC+3

27 December 2010 Friendly	Kuwait	2–2	North Korea
--:-- UTC+3

31 December 2010 Friendly	Kuwait	4–0	Zambia
--:-- UTC+3	Naser 19'; Al Enezi 21' 33'; Al Motawaa 25'

=== 2011 ===
8 January 2011	Kuwait	0–2	China
--:-- UTC+3

12 January 2011	Uzbekistan	2–1	Kuwait
--:-- UTC+3

16 January 2011	Qatar	3–0	Kuwait
--:-- UTC+3

26 March 2011 Friendly	Jordan	1–1	Kuwait
--:-- UTC+3

29 March 2011 Friendly	Kuwait	1–0	Iraq
--:-- UTC+3

2 July 2011 Friendly	Lebanon	0–6	Kuwait
--:-- UTC+3

6 July 2011 Friendly	Kuwait	1–1	Oman
--:-- UTC+3

13 July 2011 Friendly	Iraq	0–2	Kuwait
--:-- UTC+3

16 July 2011 Friendly	Kuwait	1–0	Saudi Arabia
--:-- UTC+3

23 July 2011 2014 World Cup qualification	Kuwait	3–0	Philippines	Hawalli, Kuwait
19:30 UTC+3	Nasser 17'; Neda 68'; Al Ansari 85'			Stadium: Mohammed Al-Hamad Stadium; Attendance: 20,000; Referee: Mohammad Abu Loum (Jordan)

28 July 2011 2014 World Cup qualification	Philippines	1–2	Kuwait	Manila, Philippines
19:00 UTC+8	Schröck 45+2'		Nasser 63'; W. Ali 85'	Stadium: Rizal Memorial Stadium; Attendance: 13,000; Referee: Liu Kwok Man (Hong Kong)

10 August 2011 Friendly	Kuwait	0–0	North Korea
--:-- UTC+3

27 August 2011 Friendly	Oman	1–0	Kuwait
--:-- UTC+3

2 September 2011 2014 World Cup qualification	United Arab Emirates	2–3	Kuwait	Al Ain, United Arab Emirates
19:30 UTC+4	Al Hammadi 84'; Khalil 89'		Nasser 7', 65'; Al-Mutawa 51'	Stadium: Al Qatara Stadium; Attendance: 8,715; Referee: Muhsen Basma (Syria)

6 September 2011 2014 World Cup qualification	Kuwait	1–1	South Korea	Kuwait City, Kuwait
20:00 UTC+3	Fadhel 54'		Park Chu-Young 9'	Stadium: Peace and Friendship Stadium; Attendance: 20,000; Referee: Mohsen Torky (Iran)

11 October 2011 2014 World Cup qualification	Lebanon	2–2	Kuwait
--:-- UTC+3

4 November 2011 Friendly	Kuwait	0–1	Bahrain
--:-- UTC+3

11 November 2011 2014 World Cup qualification	Kuwait	0–1	Lebanon
--:-- UTC+3

15 November 2011 2014 World Cup qualification	Kuwait	2–1	United Arab Emirates
--:-- UTC+3

14 December 2011	Oman	0–2	Kuwait
--:-- UTC+3

22 December 2011	Palestine	0–3 (a.e.t.)	Kuwait
--:-- UTC+3

=== 2012 ===
17 January 2012 Friendly	Kuwait	1–0	Uzbekistan
--:-- UTC+3

17 February 2012 Friendly	North Korea	1–1	Kuwait
--:-- UTC+9

22 February 2012 Friendly	China	2–0	Kuwait
--:-- UTC+8

29 February 2012 2014 World Cup qualification	South Korea	2–0	Kuwait
--:-- UTC+9

16 May 2012 Friendly	Kuwait	0–2	(Spain) Real Madrid	Kaifan, Kuwait
20:15 UTC+3			Di María 27'; Ronaldo 31'	Stadium: Al Kuwait Sports Club Stadium; Attendance: 18,500; Referee: Muhanad Al-Thuwani (Kuwait)

22 June 2012	Saudi Arabia	4–0	Kuwait
--:-- UTC+3

25 June 2012	Kuwait	2–0	Palestine
--:-- UTC+3

7 September 2012 Friendly	Uzbekistan	3–0	Kuwait
--:-- UTC+5

11 September 2012 Friendly	United Arab Emirates	3–0	Kuwait
--:-- UTC+4

16 October 2012 Friendly	Kuwait	2–1	Philippines
--:-- UTC+3

14 November 2012 Friendly	Kuwait	1–1	Bahrain
--:-- UTC+3

8 December 2012 2012 WAFF	Kuwait	2–1	Palestine	Kuwait
--:-- UTC+3

11 December 2012 2012 WAFF	Kuwait	0–2	Oman	Kuwait
--:-- UTC+3

14 December 2012 2012 WAFF	Kuwait	2–1	Lebanon	Kuwait
--:-- UTC+3

=== 2013 ===
6 January 2013 2013 Gulf Cup	Kuwait	2–0	Yemen	Bahrain
--:-- UTC+3

9 January 2013 2013 Gulf Cup	Iraq	1–0	Kuwait	Bahrain
--:-- UTC+3

12 January 2013 2013 Gulf Cup	Kuwait	1–0	Saudi Arabia	Bahrain
--:-- UTC+3

15 January 2013 2013 Gulf Cup	United Arab Emirates	1–0	Kuwait	Bahrain
--:-- UTC+3

18 January 2013 2013 Gulf Cup	Kuwait	6–1	Bahrain	Bahrain
--:-- UTC+3

6 February 2013	Thailand	1–3	Kuwait
--:-- UTC+7

21 March 2013 Friendly	Kuwait	2–1	Palestine
--:-- UTC+3

26 March 2013	Kuwait	1–1	Iran
--:-- UTC+3

6 June 2013 Friendly	Hungary	1–0	Kuwait
--:-- UTC+2

6 September 2013 Friendly	Kuwait	2–1	North Korea
--:-- UTC+3

9 September 2013 Friendly	Kuwait	2–1	Bahrain
--:-- UTC+3

9 October 2013 Friendly	Jordan	1–1	Kuwait
--:-- UTC+3

15 October 2013	Lebanon	1–1	Kuwait
--:-- UTC+3

8 November 2013 Friendly	Kuwait	3–0	Malaysia
--:-- UTC+3

15 November 2013	Kuwait	0–0	Lebanon
--:-- UTC+3

19 November 2013	Kuwait	3–1	Thailand
--:-- UTC+3

29 December 2013 2014 WAFF	Lebanon	0–2	Kuwait	Qatar
--:-- UTC+3

=== 2014 ===
1 January 2014 2014 WAFF	Kuwait	1–2	Jordan	Qatar
--:-- UTC+3

4 January 2014 2014 WAFF	Qatar	3–0	Kuwait	Qatar
--:-- UTC+3

7 January 2014 2014 WAFF	Kuwait	0–0	Bahrain	Qatar
--:-- UTC+3

3 March 2014	Iran	3–2	Kuwait
--:-- UTC+3:30

14 May 2014 Friendly	Kuwait	3–2	Afghanistan
--:-- UTC+3

16 May 2014 Friendly	Kuwait	2–2	Kyrgyzstan
--:-- UTC+3

25 May 2014 Friendly	Thailand	1–1	Kuwait
--:-- UTC+3

4 September 2014 Friendly	China	3–1	Kuwait
--:-- UTC+8

9 September 2014 Friendly	Kuwait	0–1	Bahrain
--:-- UTC+3

10 October 2014 Friendly	Jordan	0–1	Kuwait
--:-- UTC+3

13 October 2014 Friendly	Jordan	1–1	Kuwait
--:-- UTC+3

31 October 2014 Friendly	North Korea	0–1	Kuwait
--:-- UTC+4

4 November 2014 Friendly	Kuwait	1–1	Yemen
--:-- UTC+3

14 November 2014 2014 Gulf Cup	Iraq	0–1	Kuwait	Saudi Arabia
--:-- UTC+3

17 November 2014 2014 Gulf Cup	United Arab Emirates	2–2	Kuwait	Saudi Arabia
--:-- UTC+3

20 November 2014 2014 Gulf Cup	Kuwait	0–5	Oman	Saudi Arabia
--:-- UTC+3

22 December 2014 Friendly	Iraq	1–1	Kuwait
--:-- UTC+3

=== 2015 ===
9 January 2015	Australia	4–1	Kuwait
--:-- UTC+11

13 January 2015	Kuwait	0–1	South Korea
--:-- UTC+11

17 January 2015	Oman	1–0	Kuwait
--:-- UTC+11

30 March 2015 Friendly	Colombia	3–1	Kuwait
--:-- UTC+0

5 June 2015 Friendly	Jordan	2–2	Kuwait
--:-- UTC+3

11 June 2015 2018 World Cup qualification	Lebanon	0–1	Kuwait	Lebanon
--:-- UTC+3

3 September 2015 2018 World Cup qualification	Kuwait	9–0	Myanmar	Qatar
--:-- UTC+3

8 September 2015 2018 World Cup qualification	Laos	0–2	Kuwait	Laos
--:-- UTC+7

8 October 2015 2018 World Cup qualification	Kuwait	0–1	South Korea	Kuwait
--:-- UTC+3

13 October 2015 2018 World Cup qualification	Kuwait	0–0	Lebanon	Kuwait
--:-- UTC+3

17 November 2015 2018 World Cup qualification	Myanmar	3–0	Kuwait
--:-- UTC+7

=== 2016 ===
24 March 2016 2018 World Cup qualification	Kuwait	0–3	Laos
--:-- UTC+3

29 March 2016 2018 World Cup qualification	South Korea	3–0	Kuwait
--:-- UTC+9

=== 2017 ===
18 December 2017 Friendly	Bahrain	0–0	Kuwait	Bahrain
--:-- UTC+3

22 December 2017 2017 Gulf Cup	Kuwait	1–2	Saudi Arabia	Kuwait
--:-- UTC+3

25 December 2017 2017 Gulf Cup	Kuwait	0–1	Oman	Kuwait
--:-- UTC+3

28 December 2017 2017 Gulf Cup	Kuwait	0–0	United Arab Emirates	Kuwait
--:-- UTC+3

=== 2018 ===
21 March 2018 Friendly	Jordan	1–0	Kuwait	Jordan
--:-- UTC+3

25 March 2018 Friendly	Kuwait	1–3	Cameroon	Kuwait
--:-- UTC+3

11 May 2018 Friendly	Kuwait	2–0	Palestine	Kuwait
--:-- UTC+3

25 May 2018 Friendly	Kuwait	1–1	Egypt	Kuwait
--:-- UTC+3

10 September 2018 Friendly	Kuwait	2–2	Iraq	Kuwait
--:-- UTC+3

11 October 2018 Friendly	Kuwait	1–0	Lebanon	Kuwait
--:-- UTC+3

15 October 2018 Friendly	Kuwait	0–4	Australia	Kuwait
--:-- UTC+3

20 November 2018 Friendly	Kuwait	1–2	Syria	Kuwait
--:-- UTC+3

=== 2019 ===
21 March 2019 Friendly	Kuwait	0–0	Nepal	Kuwait
--:-- UTC+3

25 March 2019 Friendly	Kuwait	1–0	Nepal	Kuwait
--:-- UTC+3

4 August 2019 2019 WAFF	Saudi Arabia	1–2	Kuwait	Erbil, Iraq
22:30 UTC+3				Stadium: Franso Hariri Stadium

7 August 2019 2019 WAFF	Kuwait	1–1	Jordan	Erbil, Iraq
22:30 UTC+3				Stadium: Franso Hariri Stadium

10 August 2019 2019 WAFF	Kuwait	0–1	Bahrain	Erbil, Iraq
22:30 UTC+3				Stadium: Franso Hariri Stadium

5 September 2019 2022 World Cup qualification	Kuwait	7–0	Nepal	Kuwait City, Kuwait
20:00 UTC+3	Nasser 6', 50'; Al Hajeri 13'; Mawei 59'; Al-Mutawa 67'; Abujabarah 90+4'; Al-Musawi 90+7'	Report (FIFA); Report (AFC)		Stadium: Al Kuwait Sports Club Stadium; Attendance: 7,500; Referee: Kim Dae-yong (South Korea)

10 September 2019 2022 World Cup qualification	Kuwait	0–3	Australia	Kuwait City, Kuwait
18:30 UTC+3		Report (FIFA); Report (AFC)	Leckie 7', 30'; Mooy 38'	Stadium: Al Kuwait Sports Club Stadium; Attendance: 11,852; Referee: Muhammad Taqi (Singapore)

10 October 2019 2022 World Cup qualification	Jordan	0–0	Kuwait	Amman, Jordan
19:00 UTC+3		Report (FIFA); Report (AFC)		Stadium: Amman International Stadium; Attendance: 10,720; Referee: Ryuji Sato (Japan)

14 November 2019 2022 World Cup qualification	Kuwait	9–0	Chinese Taipei	Kuwait City, Kuwait
19:00 UTC+3	Nasser 22', 59'; Al Ansari 42'; Al-Faneeni 49'; Al-Mutawa 55'; Zayid 62'; Al-Khaldi 73'; Chen Wei-chuan 77' (o.g.); Ajab 81'	Report (FIFA); Report (AFC)		Stadium: Al Kuwait Sports Club Stadium; Attendance: 8,400; Referee: Mohd Amirul Izwan Yaacob (Malaysia)

19 November 2019 2022 World Cup qualification	Nepal	0–1	Kuwait	Thimphu, Bhutan
15:00 UTC+6		Report (FIFA); Report (AFC)	Al-Mutawa 28'	Stadium: Changlimithang Stadium; Attendance: 2,000; Referee: Omar Al-Yaqoubi (Oman)

27 November 2019 2019 Gulf Cup	Saudi Arabia	1–3	Kuwait	Doha, Qatar
20:00 UTC+3	Al-Buraikan 90+6'	Report	Al-Dhefiri 43'; Al-Sanea 45+1'; Al-Faneni 90'	Stadium: Abdullah bin Khalifa Stadium; Referee: Mohammed Abdulla Hassan Mohamed (United Arab Emirates)

30 November 2019 2019 Gulf Cup	Kuwait	1–2	Oman	Doha, Qatar
17:30 UTC+3	Nasser 79'	Report	Al-Muqbali 16' (pen.), 32' (pen.)	Stadium: Abdullah bin Khalifa Stadium; Referee: Khamis Al Marri (Qatar)

2 December 2019 2019 Gulf Cup	Kuwait	2–4	Bahrain	Doha, Qatar
20:00 UTC+3	Nasser 59' (pen.); Zanki 85'	Report	Madan 45+1'; Al-Shaikh 69'; Thiago Augusto 83', 90+3'	Stadium: Khalifa International Stadium; Referee: Ammar Al-Jeneibi (United Arab Emirates)

== Head-to-head records ==
Kuwait national football team head-to-head records (2010–2019)
Opponent	Pld	W	D	L	GF	GA	GD	Pts	Confederation
Afghanistan	1	1	0	0	3	2	+1	3	AFC
Australia	4	0	1	3	3	13	–10	1	AFC
Azerbaijan	1	0	1	0	1	1	0	1	UEFA
Bahrain	11	3	3	5	16	14	+2	12	AFC
Cameroon	1	0	0	1	1	3	–2	0	CAF
China	3	0	0	3	1	7	–6	0	AFC
Chinese Taipei	1	1	0	0	9	0	+9	3	AFC
Colombia	1	0	0	1	1	3	–2	0	CONMEBOL
Egypt	1	0	1	0	1	1	0	1	CAF
Hungary	1	0	0	1	0	1	–1	0	UEFA
India	1	1	0	0	9	1	+8	3	AFC
Iran	3	1	1	1	5	5	0	4	AFC
Iraq	8	3	4	1	10	7	+3	13	AFC
Jordan	10	1	7	2	10	11	–1	10	AFC
Kyrgyzstan	1	0	1	0	2	2	0	1	AFC
Laos	2	1	0	1	2	3	–1	3	AFC
Lebanon	10	5	4	1	15	5	+10	19	AFC
Malaysia	1	1	0	0	3	0	+3	3	AFC
Myanmar	2	1	0	1	9	3	+6	3	AFC
Nepal	4	3	1	0	9	0	+9	10	AFC
North Korea	6	3	3	0	8	5	+3	12	AFC
Oman	9	1	2	6	4	13	–9	5	AFC
Palestine	5	5	0	0	11	2	+9	15	AFC
Philippines	3	3	0	0	7	2	+5	9	AFC
Qatar	3	1	0	2	1	6	–5	3	AFC
Saudi Arabia	8	5	1	2	9	8	+1	16	AFC
South Korea	5	0	1	4	1	8	–7	1	AFC
Syria	4	2	1	1	7	4	+3	7	AFC
Thailand	3	2	1	0	7	3	+4	7	AFC
United Arab Emirates	7	2	2	3	7	12	–5	8	AFC
Uzbekistan	3	1	0	2	2	5	–3	3	AFC
Vietnam	1	1	0	0	3	1	+2	3	AFC
Yemen	4	2	2	0	7	2	+5	8	AFC
Zambia	1	1	0	0	4	0	+4	3	CAF
Total	127	49	38	40	199	144	+55	185	
