= 2010 in Japanese football =

2010 season

Japanese football in 2010

== J.League Division 1 ==
Pos	Team	Pld	W	D	L	GF	GA	GD	Pts	Qualification or relegation
1	Nagoya Grampus (C)	34	23	3	8	54	37	+17	72	Qualification for 2011 AFC Champions League group stage (Note: Kashima Antlers qualified as 2010 Emperor's Cup winners.)
2	Gamba Osaka	34	18	8	8	65	44	+21	62	Qualification for 2011 AFC Champions League group stage
3	Cerezo Osaka	34	17	10	7	58	32	+26	61	Qualification for 2011 AFC Champions League group stage
4	Kashima Antlers	34	16	12	6	51	31	+20	60	Qualification for 2011 AFC Champions League group stage
5	Kawasaki Frontale	34	15	9	10	61	47	+14	54	
6	Shimizu S-Pulse	34	15	9	10	60	49	+11	54	
7	Sanfrecce Hiroshima	34	14	9	11	45	38	+7	51	
8	Yokohama F. Marinos	34	15	6	13	43	39	+4	51	
9	Albirex Niigata	34	12	13	9	48	45	+3	49	
10	Urawa Red Diamonds	34	14	6	14	48	41	+7	48	
11	Júbilo Iwata	34	11	11	12	38	49	−11	44	
12	Omiya Ardija	34	11	9	14	39	45	−6	42	
13	Montedio Yamagata	34	11	9	14	29	42	−13	42	
14	Vegalta Sendai	34	10	9	15	40	46	−6	39	
15	Vissel Kobe	34	9	11	14	37	45	−8	38	
16	FC Tokyo (R)	34	8	12	14	36	41	−5	36	Relegation to 2011 J.League Division 2
17	Kyoto Sanga (R)	34	4	7	23	30	60	−30	19	Relegation to 2011 J.League Division 2
18	Shonan Bellmare (R)	34	3	7	24	31	82	−51	16	Relegation to 2011 J.League Division 2

Updated to match(es) played on December 4, 2010. Source: J.League Division 1
Rules for classification: 1) points; 2) goal difference; 3) number of goals scored.
(C) Champions; (R) Relegated

== J.League Division 2 ==
Pos	Team	Pld	W	D	L	GF	GA	GD	Pts	Promotion or relegation
1	Kashiwa Reysol (C, P)	36	23	11	2	71	24	+47	80	Promotion to 2011 J. League Division 1
2	Ventforet Kofu (P)	36	19	13	4	71	40	+31	70	Promotion to 2011 J. League Division 1
3	Avispa Fukuoka (P)	36	21	6	9	63	34	+29	69	Promotion to 2011 J. League Division 1
4	JEF United Chiba	36	18	7	11	58	37	+21	61	
5	Tokyo Verdy	36	17	7	12	47	34	+13	58	
6	Yokohama FC	36	16	6	14	54	47	+7	54	
7	Roasso Kumamoto	36	14	12	10	39	43	−4	54	
8	Tokushima Vortis	36	15	6	15	51	47	+4	51	
9	Sagan Tosu	36	13	12	11	42	41	+1	51	
10	Tochigi SC	36	14	8	14	46	42	+4	50	
11	Ehime FC	36	12	12	12	34	34	0	48	
12	Thespa Kusatsu	36	14	6	16	36	48	−12	48	
13	Consadole Sapporo	36	11	13	12	37	38	−1	46	
14	FC Gifu	36	13	6	17	32	45	−13	45	
15	Oita Trinita	36	10	11	15	39	49	−10	41	
16	Mito HollyHock	36	8	14	14	29	45	−16	38	
17	Fagiano Okayama	36	8	8	20	27	51	−24	32	
18	Kataller Toyama	36	8	4	24	39	71	−32	28	
19	Giravanz Kitakyushu	36	1	12	23	20	65	−45	15	

Updated to match(es) played on December 4, 2010. Source: J.League Division 2
Rules for classification: 1) points; 2) goal difference; 3) number of goals scored.
(C) Champions; (P) Promoted

== Japan Football League ==
Pos	Team	Pld	W	D	L	GF	GA	GD	Pts	Promotion or relegation
1	Gainare Tottori (Note: J. League Associate Membership and passed a final inspection by J. League.) (C, P)	34	24	5	5	64	31	+33	77 (Note: Occupied one of the top 3 places at the end of the first half of the season (17th week) and were seeded for 2010 Emperor's Cup. These clubs were automatically qualified for the tournament, while each of other JFL clubs had to go through the prefectural qualifier.)	Promotion to 2011 J.League Division 2 (Note: Must hold J. League Associate Membership, pass a final inspection by J. League and finish no less than in fourth place to be promoted. Machida Zelvia have announced that their stadium is not meeting the J. League standards so they are not eligible for the promotion till 2012 season. Later the announcement of the same kind was made by V-Varen Nagasaki, although their eligibility date is as far as 2013 season.)
2	Sagawa Shiga	34	17	11	6	69	35	+34	62	
3	Machida Zelvia	34	19	4	11	71	44	+27	61	
4	Honda FC	34	18	5	11	52	43	+9	59	
5	V-Varen Nagasaki	34	15	8	11	50	38	+12	53	
6	SP Kyoto	34	15	8	11	54	46	+8	53	
7	Matsumoto Yamaga	34	15	7	12	48	41	+7	52	
8	Blaublitz Akita	34	14	9	11	54	41	+13	51	
9	Zweigen Kanazawa	34	13	9	12	46	41	+5	48	
10	FC Ryukyu	34	14	6	14	51	51	0	48	
11	MIO Biwako Kusatsu	34	13	7	14	51	56	−5	46	
12	Yokogawa Musashino	34	12	9	13	34	38	−4	45	
13	Honda Lock	34	10	12	12	36	39	−3	42	
14	Sony Sendai	34	11	9	14	34	42	−8	42	
15	Tochigi Uva	34	7	10	17	41	75	−34	31	
16	JEF Reserves	34	7	9	18	31	55	−24	30	
17	Arte Takasaki	34	7	8	19	28	51	−23	29	Promotion/relegation Series (Note: Play-off series' and direct relegation occurrence is dependent on the number of places available after promotions to J2.)
18	Ryutsu Keizai University (R)	34	5	4	25	33	80	−47	19	Relegation to Regional Leagues

Updated to match(es) played on November 28, 2010. Source: Japan Football League
Rules for classification: 1) points; 2) goal difference; 3) number of goals scored.
(C) Champions; (P) Promoted; (R) Relegated

== Emperor's Cup ==
1 January 2011
14:00

Kashima Antlers	2–1	Shimizu S-Pulse
Fellype Gabriel 26'; Nozawa 77'	Report	Johnsen 59'

National Olympic Stadium, Shinjuku, Tokyo
Attendance: 41,348
Referee: Masaaki Iemoto

== J.League Cup ==
3 November 2010
14:09

Júbilo Iwata	5–3 (a.e.t.)	Sanfrecce Hiroshima
Funatani 36'; Maeda 89', 109'; Suganuma 102'; Yamazaki 104'		Lee 43'; Yamagishi 48'; Makino 105+3'

Todoroki Athletics Stadium, Kawasaki; Tokyo National Stadium, Tokyo
Attendance: 39,767
Referee: Hiroyoshi Takayama

== Japanese Super Cup ==
2010

Kashima Antlers	1–1	Gamba Osaka
Marquinhos 20' (pen.)	Summary	Kaji 45'
Penalties
	5–3

Kashima Soccer Stadium, Kashima
Attendance: 34,634
Referee: Yuichi Nishimura

== National team (Men) ==
=== Results ===
2010.01.06 2011 Asian Cup qualification	Yemen	2–3	Japan	Sana'a, Yemen
	Al-Fadhli 13'; Abbod 39'	JFA	Hirayama 42', 55', 79'	Attendance: 10,000

2010.02.02 International Friendly	Japan	0–0	Venezuela	Ōita, Japan
		JFA		Stadium: Ōita Stadium; Attendance: 27,009

2010.02.06 2010 East Asian Football Championship	Japan	0–0	China	Tokyo, Japan
		JFA		Stadium: Tokyo Stadium; Attendance: 25,964

2010.02.11 2010 East Asian Football Championship	Japan	3–0	Hong Kong	Tokyo, Japan
	Keiji Tamada 41', 82'; Marcus Tulio Tanaka 65'	JFA		Stadium: Tokyo National Stadium; Attendance: 16,368

2010.02.14 2010 East Asian Football Championship	Japan	1–3	South Korea	Tokyo, Japan
	Yasuhito Endo 23' (pen.)	JFA	Lee Dong-Gook 33' (pen.); Lee Seung-Ryul 39'; Kim Jae-Sung 70'	Stadium: Tokyo National Stadium; Attendance: 42,951

2010.03.03 2011 Asian Cup qualification	Japan	2–0	Bahrain	Aichi, Japan
	Okazaki 36'; Honda 89'	JFA		Stadium: Toyota Stadium; Attendance: 38,042

2010.04.07 International Friendly	Japan	0–3	Serbia	Osaka, Japan
		JFA	Mrđa 15', 23'; Tomić 60'	Stadium: Osaka Nagai Stadium; Attendance: 46,270

2010.05.24 International Friendly	Japan	0–2	South Korea	Saitama, Japan
		JFA	Park Ji-Sung 6'; Park Chu-Young 90' (pen.)	Stadium: Saitama Stadium 2002; Attendance: 57,873

2010.05.30 International Friendly	Japan	1–2	England	Graz, Austria
	Tulio 7'	JFA	Tanaka 73' (o.g.); Nakazawa 83' (o.g.)	Stadium: UPC-Arena; Attendance: 15,326

2010.06.04 International Friendly	Japan	0–2	Ivory Coast	Sion, Switzerland
		JFA	Tanaka 13' (o.g.); K Touré 80'	Stadium: Stade Tourbillon; Attendance: 4,919

2010.06.14 2010 FIFA World Cup	Japan	1–0	Cameroon	Bloemfontein, South Africa
	Honda 39'	JFA		Stadium: Free State Stadium; Attendance: 30,620

2010.06.19 2010 FIFA World Cup	Netherlands	1–0	Japan	Durban, South Africa
	Sneijder 53'	JFA		Stadium: Moses Mabhida Stadium; Attendance: 62,010

2010.06.24 2010 FIFA World Cup	Denmark	1–3	Japan	Rustenburg, South Africa
	Tomasson 81'	JFA	Honda 17'; Endō 30'; Okazaki 87'	Stadium: Royal Bafokeng Stadium; Attendance: 27,967

2010.06.29 2010 FIFA World Cup	Paraguay	0–0 (a.e.t.) (5–3 p)	Japan	Pretoria, South Africa
		JFA		Stadium: Loftus Versfeld Stadium; Attendance: 36,742
	Penalties
	Barreto (penalty scored); Barrios (penalty scored); Riveros (penalty scored); Valdez (penalty scored); Cardozo (penalty scored)		(penalty scored) Endō; (penalty scored) Hasebe; (penalty missed) Komano; (penalty scored) Honda

2010.09.04 International Friendly	Japan	1–0	Paraguay	Kanagawa, Japan
	Kagawa 64'	JFA		Stadium: International Stadium Yokohama; Attendance: 65,157

2010.09.07 International Friendly	Japan	2–1	Guatemala	Osaka, Japan
	Morimoto 12', 20'	JFA	Rodríguez 22'	Stadium: Osaka Nagai Stadium; Attendance: 44,541

2010.10.08 International Friendly	Japan	1–0	Argentina	Saitama, Japan
	Okazaki 19'	JFA		Stadium: Saitama Stadium 2002; Attendance: 57,735

2010.10.12 International Friendly	South Korea	0–0	Japan	Seoul, South Korea
		JFA		Attendance: 62,503

=== Players statistics ===
Player	-2009	01.06	02.02	02.06	02.11	02.14	03.03	04.07	05.24	05.30	06.04	06.14	06.19	06.24	06.29	09.04	09.07	10.08	10.12	2010	Total
Yuji Nakazawa	96(17)	-	O	O	O	O	O	O	O	O	O	O	O	O	O	O	-	-	-	14(0)	110(17)
Shunsuke Nakamura	93(24)	-	-	-	-	-	O	O	O	-	O	-	O	-	-	-	-	-	-	5(0)	98(24)
Yasuhito Endō	85(7)	-	O	O	O	O(1)	O	O	O	O	O	O	O	O(1)	O	-	-	O	O	15(2)	100(9)
Junichi Inamoto	74(5)	-	O	O	O	O	-	O	-	-	O	O	-	O	-	-	-	-	-	8(0)	82(5)
Seigo Narazaki	69(0)	-	O	O	O	O	O	O	O	-	-	-	-	-	-	-	O	-	-	8(0)	77(0)
Keiji Tamada	63(14)	-	-	O	O(2)	O	O	O	-	O	O	-	O	-	O	-	-	-	-	9(2)	72(16)
Mitsuo Ogasawara	53(7)	-	O	-	O	-	-	-	-	-	-	-	-	-	-	-	-	-	-	2(0)	55(7)
Yūichi Komano	49(0)	-	O	-	O	-	-	-	O	-	O	O	O	O	O	O	O	-	O	11(0)	60(0)
Yoshito Ōkubo	42(5)	-	O	O	O	O	-	-	O	O	O	O	O	O	O	-	-	-	-	11(0)	53(5)
Kengo Nakamura	41(5)	-	O	O	O	O	-	-	O	-	O	-	-	-	O	O	O	O	O	11(0)	52(5)
Yuki Abe	41(3)	-	-	-	-	-	-	O	O	O	O	O	O	O	O	-	-	O	-	9(0)	50(3)
Yasuyuki Konno	33(0)	-	-	-	O	-	-	-	O	O	O	-	-	O	-	-	-	O	O	7(0)	40(0)
Marcus Tulio Tanaka	32(6)	-	O	O	O(1)	O	O	-	-	O(1)	O	O	O	O	O	-	-	-	-	11(2)	43(8)
Hisato Satō	28(4)	-	O	O	-	O	-	-	-	-	-	-	-	-	-	-	-	-	-	3(0)	31(4)
Makoto Hasebe	27(1)	-	-	-	-	-	O	-	O	O	O	O	O	O	O	-	-	O	O	10(0)	37(1)
Atsuto Uchida	27(1)	-	-	O	O	O	O	-	-	-	-	-	-	-	-	O	-	O	O	7(0)	34(1)
Daisuke Matsui	21(1)	-	-	-	-	-	O	-	-	O	-	O	O	O	O	O	-	-	O	8(0)	29(1)
Shinji Okazaki	20(15)	-	O	O	-	O	O(1)	O	O	O	O	O	O	O(1)	O	O	O	O(1)	-	15(3)	35(18)
Yuto Nagatomo	18(3)	-	O	O	-	O	O	O	O	O	O	O	O	O	O	O	O	O	O	16(0)	34(3)
Kisho Yano	16(2)	-	-	-	-	-	-	O	O	-	-	O	-	-	-	-	-	-	-	3(0)	19(2)
Hideo Hashimoto	13(0)	-	-	-	-	-	-	-	-	-	-	-	-	-	-	O	O	-	-	2(0)	15(0)
Koji Yamase	12(5)	-	-	-	-	-	-	O	-	-	-	-	-	-	-	-	-	-	-	1(0)	13(5)
Keisuke Honda	11(3)	-	-	-	-	-	O(1)	-	O	O	O	O(1)	O	O(1)	O	O	O	O	O	12(3)	23(6)
Shinji Kagawa	10(2)	-	O	-	O	O	-	-	-	-	-	-	-	-	-	O(1)	O	O	O	7(1)	17(3)
Shinzo Koroki	10(0)	-	-	-	-	-	-	O	-	-	-	-	-	-	-	-	-	-	-	1(0)	11(0)
Eiji Kawashima	8(0)	-	-	-	-	-	-	-	-	O	O	O	O	O	O	O	-	O	-	8(0)	16(0)
Ryoichi Maeda	5(2)	-	-	-	-	-	-	-	-	-	-	-	-	-	-	-	-	O	O	2(0)	7(2)
Yuhei Tokunaga	5(0)	-	O	-	-	-	-	O	-	-	-	-	-	-	-	-	-	-	-	2(0)	7(0)
Jungo Fujimoto	4(0)	-	-	-	-	-	-	-	-	-	-	-	-	-	-	O	O	-	-	2(0)	6(0)
Naohiro Ishikawa	4(0)	-	-	-	-	-	-	O	-	-	-	-	-	-	-	-	-	-	-	1(0)	5(0)
Takayuki Morimoto	2(1)	-	-	-	-	-	O	-	O	O	O	-	-	-	-	O	O(2)	O	-	7(2)	9(3)
Mu Kanazaki	1(0)	O	O	O	-	-	-	-	-	-	-	-	-	-	-	-	-	-	O	4(0)	5(0)
Yuzo Kurihara	1(0)	-	-	-	-	-	-	O	-	-	-	-	-	-	-	O	-	O	O	4(0)	5(0)
Daiki Iwamasa	1(0)	-	-	-	-	O	-	-	-	-	-	-	-	-	-	O	O	-	-	3(0)	4(0)
Takashi Inui	1(0)	O	-	-	-	-	-	-	-	-	-	-	-	-	-	-	O	-	-	2(0)	3(0)
Shusaku Nishikawa	1(0)	-	-	-	-	-	-	-	-	-	-	-	-	-	-	-	-	O	O	2(0)	3(0)
Naoki Yamada	1(0)	O	-	-	-	-	-	-	-	-	-	-	-	-	-	-	-	-	-	1(0)	2(0)
Sota Hirayama	0(0)	O(3)	O	O	O	-	-	-	-	-	-	-	-	-	-	-	-	-	-	4(3)	4(3)
Tomoaki Makino	0(0)	O	-	-	-	-	-	O	-	-	-	-	-	-	-	O	O	-	-	4(0)	4(0)
Hajime Hosogai	0(0)	-	-	-	-	-	-	-	-	-	-	-	-	-	-	O	O	-	O	3(0)	3(0)
Shuichi Gonda	0(0)	O	-	-	-	-	-	-	-	-	-	-	-	-	-	-	-	-	-	1(0)	1(0)
Naoya Kikuchi	0(0)	O	-	-	-	-	-	-	-	-	-	-	-	-	-	-	-	-	-	1(0)	1(0)
Maya Yoshida	0(0)	O	-	-	-	-	-	-	-	-	-	-	-	-	-	-	-	-	-	1(0)	1(0)
Kosuke Ota	0(0)	O	-	-	-	-	-	-	-	-	-	-	-	-	-	-	-	-	-	1(0)	1(0)
Kazuya Yamamura	0(0)	O	-	-	-	-	-	-	-	-	-	-	-	-	-	-	-	-	-	1(0)	1(0)
Takuji Yonemoto	0(0)	O	-	-	-	-	-	-	-	-	-	-	-	-	-	-	-	-	-	1(0)	1(0)
Yōsuke Kashiwagi	0(0)	O	-	-	-	-	-	-	-	-	-	-	-	-	-	-	-	-	-	1(0)	1(0)
Kazuma Watanabe	0(0)	O	-	-	-	-	-	-	-	-	-	-	-	-	-	-	-	-	-	1(0)	1(0)
Kensuke Nagai	0(0)	O	-	-	-	-	-	-	-	-	-	-	-	-	-	-	-	-	-	1(0)	1(0)
Mitsuru Nagata	0(0)	-	-	-	-	-	-	-	-	-	-	-	-	-	-	-	O	-	-	1(0)	1(0)
Kunimitsu Sekiguchi	0(0)	-	-	-	-	-	-	-	-	-	-	-	-	-	-	-	-	O	-	1(0)	1(0)

== National team (Women) ==
=== Results ===
2010.01.13	Japan	1–0	Denmark	Chile
	Yamaguchi (?)

2010.01.15	Japan	1–1	Chile	Chile
	Iwashimizu (?)		? (?)

2010.01.21	Japan	4–2	Colombia	Chile
	Ando (?); Takase (?); Sudo (?)		? (?) ? (?)

2010.01.23	Japan	3–0	Argentina	Chile
	Nakano (?); Ando (?); Yamaguchi (?)

2010.02.06	Japan	2–0	China	Tokyo, Japan
	Miyama (?); Kinga (?)			Stadium: Tokyo Stadium

2010.02.11	Japan	3–0	Chinese Taipei	Tokyo, Japan
	Iwabuchi (?); Takase (?)			Stadium: National Stadium

2010.02.13	Japan	2–1	South Korea	Tokyo, Japan
	Ono (?); Yamaguchi (?)		? (?)	Stadium: Tokyo Stadium

2010.05.08	Japan	4–0	Mexico	Nagano, Japan
	Kinga (?); Takase (?); Ono (?)			Stadium: Matsumotodaira Football Stadium

2010.05.11	Japan	3–0	Mexico	Niigata, Japan
	Ono (?); Minamiyama (?)			Stadium: Niigata Stadium

2010.05.20	Japan	8–0	Myanmar	China
	Iwashimizu (?); Sawa (?); Yamaguchi (?); Sameshima (?); Miyama (?); Kamionobe (?)

2010.05.22	Japan	4–0	Thailand	China
	Takase (?); Nakano (?); Utsugi (?); Ando (?)

2010.05.24	Japan	2–1	North Korea	China
	Ando (?); Nagasato (?)		? (?)

2010.05.27	Japan	0–1	Australia	China
			? (?)

2010.05.30	Japan	2–0	China	China
	Ando (?); Sawa (?)

2010.11.14	Japan	4–0	Thailand	China
	Kitamoto (?); Ono (?); Sakaguchi (?) (?)

2010.11.18	Japan	0–0	North Korea	China

2010.11.20	Japan	1–0	China	China
	Ono (?)

2010.11.22	Japan	1–0	North Korea	China
	Iwashimizu (?)

=== Players statistics ===
Player	-2009	01.13	01.15	01.21	01.23	02.06	02.11	02.13	05.08	05.11	05.20	05.22	05.24	05.27	05.30	11.14	11.18	11.20	11.22	2010	Total
Homare Sawa	146(72)	-	O	-	O	O	O	O	O	O	O(2)	O	-	O	O(1)	O	O	O	O	15(3)	161(75)
Nozomi Yamago	88(0)	-	-	-	O	-	-	O	O	-	-	O	-	-	-	-	O	O	O	7(0)	95(0)
Kozue Ando	71(11)	-	O	O(2)	O(1)	-	-	-	-	-	O	O(1)	O(1)	O	O(1)	-	-	-	-	8(6)	79(17)
Aya Miyama	69(20)	O	O	O	O	O(1)	O	O	-	O	O(1)	O	O	O	O	O	O	O	O	17(2)	86(22)
Shinobu Ono	68(27)	-	O	O	O	O	-	O(1)	O(2)	O(1)	O	-	-	-	-	O(1)	O	O(1)	O	12(6)	80(33)
Yuki Nagasato	55(28)	-	-	-	-	-	-	-	-	-	-	-	O(1)	O	O	-	-	-	-	3(1)	58(29)
Kyoko Yano	52(1)	-	O	-	O	O	-	O	O	O	O	-	O	O	-	O	O	O	O	13(0)	65(1)
Miho Fukumoto	47(0)	O	-	-	-	-	O	-	-	O	-	-	O	-	-	-	-	-	-	4(0)	51(0)
Azusa Iwashimizu	44(5)	-	O(1)	-	O	O	O	O	O	-	O(1)	O	-	O	O	-	O	O	O(1)	13(3)	57(8)
Yukari Kinga	40(2)	O	O	-	O	O(1)	-	O	O(1)	O	O	-	O	O	O	O	O	O	O	15(2)	55(4)
Mizuho Sakaguchi	29(14)	-	-	-	-	-	-	-	-	-	-	-	-	-	-	O(1)	O	O	O	4(1)	33(15)
Rumi Utsugi	29(4)	O	-	O	-	O	-	O	O	-	-	O(1)	O	O	O	-	-	-	-	9(1)	38(5)
Nayuha Toyoda	19(0)	-	-	-	-	-	-	-	O	O	-	O	-	-	-	-	-	-	-	3(0)	22(0)
Ayako Kitamoto	12(3)	-	O	-	-	-	-	-	-	-	-	-	-	-	-	O(1)	O	O	O	5(1)	17(4)
Akiko Sudo	8(2)	O	-	O(1)	-	-	O	-	O	O	O	-	-	O	-	-	-	-	-	7(1)	15(3)
Ayumi Kaihori	6(0)	-	-	O	-	O	-	-	O	-	O	-	-	O	O	O	-	-	-	7(0)	13(0)
Aya Sameshima	5(1)	O	O	O	O	O	O	O	O	-	O(1)	-	O	O	O	O	-	O	O	15(1)	20(2)
Nahomi Kawasumi	3(0)	-	-	-	-	-	-	-	-	O	-	O	O	-	O	O	O	-	O	7(0)	10(0)
Mami Yamaguchi	2(1)	O(1)	O	-	O(1)	O	O	O(1)	-	-	O(2)	O	O	O	O	O	O	O	-	14(5)	16(6)
Saki Kumagai	2(0)	-	O	-	O	O	O	O	O	O	O	-	O	O	O	O	O	O	O	15(0)	17(0)
Megumi Kamionobe	1(0)	O	-	O	-	-	-	-	-	O	O(1)	O	O	O	-	-	O	O	O	10(1)	11(1)
Megumi Takase	0(0)	-	O	O(1)	O	-	O(1)	O	O(1)	-	O	O(1)	-	-	-	O	O	O	O	12(4)	12(4)
Manami Nakano	0(0)	O	-	O	O(1)	-	O	O	O	O	-	O(1)	O	-	-	O	-	-	-	10(2)	10(2)
Yuika Sugasawa	0(0)	O	-	O	-	-	O	-	O	O	-	O	-	-	-	-	-	-	-	6(0)	6(0)
Chiaki Minamiyama	0(0)	-	-	-	-	-	-	-	O	O(2)	-	O	O	-	-	-	-	-	-	4(2)	4(2)
Mana Iwabuchi	0(0)	-	-	-	-	O	O(2)	O	-	-	-	-	-	-	-	-	-	-	-	3(2)	3(2)
Kana Osafune	0(0)	O	-	O	-	-	O	-	-	-	-	-	-	-	-	-	-	-	-	3(0)	3(0)
Nanase Kiryu	0(0)	O	-	O	-	-	O	-	-	-	-	-	-	-	-	-	-	-	-	3(0)	3(0)
Natsuko Hara	0(0)	O	O	-	-	-	-	-	-	-	-	-	-	-	-	-	-	-	-	2(0)	2(0)
Yuri Kawamura	0(0)	O	-	O	-	-	-	-	-	-	-	-	-	-	-	-	-	-	-	2(0)	2(0)
Sawako Yasumoto	0(0)	-	-	-	-	-	-	-	O	O	-	-	-	-	-	-	-	-	-	2(0)	2(0)
Erina Yamane	0(0)	-	O	-	-	-	-	-	-	-	-	-	-	-	-	-	-	-	-	1(0)	1(0)
Asako Ideue	0(0)	-	-	-	-	-	-	-	-	O	-	-	-	-	-	-	-	-	-	1(0)	1(0)
Yuiko Konno	0(0)	-	-	-	-	-	-	-	-	O	-	-	-	-	-	-	-	-	-	1(0)	1(0)
