= UAE Rookie of the Year =

The UAE Pro League Rookie of the Year is awarded by the Sheikh Majid Bin Mohammed Football Season Award to the most outstanding rookie of the season. To be considered a rookie the following are criteria for the award: his behaviors, his participation with the national team and Club, the impact of the player on the results of his team, and the extent of his contribution to the achievement of team championship

== Best Rookie of the Year ==
Year	Footballer	Club	Nationality
2008	Ismail Al Hammadi	Al-Ahli	United Arab Emirates
2009	Sultan Bargash	Al-Jazira	United Arab Emirates

== Wins By Club ==
#	Club	Winners
1	Al-Ahli	1
2	Al-Jazira	1
