= Hussain Salman =

Bahraini footballer

Personal information
- Full name: Hussain Salman Mohamed Makki Habib
- Date of birth: 10 December 1982 (age 43)
- Place of birth: Bahrain
- Height: 1.77 m (5 ft 10 in)
- Position: Midfielder

Senior career*
Years	Team	Apps	(Gls)
2002–2004	Al-Shabab		
2005	Al-Arabi		
2005	Al-Wasl		
2006	Al-Riffa		
2007	Muharraq Club		
2007	Al-Shabab		
2008–2015	Al-Riffa		

International career^{‡}
2002–2013	Bahrain	45	(5)
- * Club domestic league appearances and goals as of 20 November 2008 ‡ National team caps and goals as of 18 January 2013

Hussain Salman Mohamed Makki Habib (Arabic: حسين سلمان محمد مكي حبيب; born 10 December 1982) is a Bahraini footballer.

He scored the only goal in a friendly against Inter Milan in January 2007 which ended 5–1.

== National team career statistics ==
=== Goals for senior national team ===
#	Date	Venue	Opponent	Score	Result	Competition
	12 January 2007	Dubai, UAE	Yemen	4–0	Win	Friendly
	23 December 2008	Manama, Bahrain	Saudi Arabia	1–0	Win	Friendly
	18 November 2009	Manama, Bahrain	Yemen	4–0	Win	2011 AFC Asian Cup qualification
	12 October 2010	Manama, Bahrain	Uzbekistan	2–4	Loss	Friendly
