= Ali Yaakoub =

Lebanese footballer (born 1985)

Personal information
- Full name: Ali Hassan Yaakoub
- Date of birth: 26 January 1985 (age 41)
- Place of birth: Maqne, Lebanon
- Height: 1.77 m (5 ft 10 in)
- Position: Midfielder

Senior career*
Years	Team	Apps	(Gls)
2005–2008	Ahed		
2008–2010	Nejmeh		
2010–2020	Mabarra		
2015–2016	→ Nabi Chit (loan)	4	(0)

International career
2007	Lebanon U23		
2006–2010	Lebanon	26	(1)
- * Club domestic league appearances and goals

Ali Hassan Yaakoub (Arabic: علي حسن يعقوب; born 26 January 1985) is a Lebanese former footballer who played as a midfielder.

== Career statistics ==
=== International ===
Scores and results list Lebanon's goal tally first, score column indicates score after each Yaakoub goal.

List of international goals scored by Ali Yaakoub
No.	Date	Venue	Opponent	Score	Result	Competition	Ref.
1	9 April 2008	Camille Chamoun Sports City Stadium, Beirut, Lebanon	Maldives	2–0	4–0	2011 AFC Asian Cup qualification	
