= Faisal Ajab Al-Azemi =

Kuwaiti footballer (born 1993)

Faisal Al-Azemi
Personal information
- Full name: Faisal Saad Ajab Al-Azemi
- Date of birth: 23 January 1993 (age 33)
- Place of birth: Kuwait
- Height: 1.79 m (5 ft 10 in)
- Position: Forward

Team information
- Current team: Al Sahel SC
- Number: 99

Senior career*
Years	Team	Apps	(Gls)
2014–2017	Qadsia	35	(15)
2017–2018	Al Tadamon	19	(15)
2018	Al-Markhiya	0	(0)
2019	Al Tadamon	4	(1)
2019–2020	Al Arabi	16	(2)
2020–2021	Al Tadamon	10	(4)
2021–	Al Sahel SC	16	(6)

International career^{‡}
2014–2015	Kuwait U23	3	(1)
2014–	Kuwait	15	(2)
- * Club domestic league appearances and goals as of 14:14, 14 March 2018 (UTC) ‡ National team caps and goals as of 14:14, 25 May 2018 (UTC)

Faisal Saad Ajab Al-Azemi (Arabic: فَيْصَل سَعْد عَجَب الْعَازِمِيّ; born 23 January 1993) is a Kuwaiti footballer. His elder brothers are Ahmad Ajab and Khalid Ajab.

== International career ==
=== International goals ===
Scores and results list Kuwait's goal tally first.

No.	Date	Venue	Opponent	Score	Result	Competition
1.	4 August 2019	Franso Hariri Stadium, Erbil, Iraq	Saudi Arabia	2–1	2–1	2019 WAFF Championship
2.	14 November 2019	Al Kuwait Sports Club Stadium, Kuwait City, Kuwait	Chinese Taipei	9–0	9–0	2022 FIFA World Cup qualification

== Personal life ==
Faisal brothers, Ahmad and Khalid, was also footballers.

== Honours ==
Qadsia

Winner

- AFC Cup: 2014
- Kuwait Emir Cup: 2014–15
- Kuwait Super Cup: 2014

Runner-up

- Kuwait Super Cup: 2015

Individual

- Kuwaiti Premier League Top Scorer: 2017–18
