= Mohammed Al Abidi =

Yemeni footballer

Personal information
- Date of birth: January 15, 1987 (age 39)
- Place of birth: Al-Bayda, North Yemen
- Height: 6 ft 1 in (1.85 m)
- Position: Forward

Senior career*
Years	Team	Apps	(Gls)
2008–2012	Al-Shabab Al-bayda	30	
2013	Al-Ahli Club Sanaa	11	
2014	Shaab Ibb SCC	3	

International career
2010–2014	Yemen	16	(2)
- * Club domestic league appearances and goals

Mohammed Al Abidi (born January 15, 1987) is a Yemeni footballer who played at 2011 AFC Asian Cup qualification as a forward.
