= Khalid Ajab =

Kuwaiti footballer (born 1986)

Personal information
- Full name: Khalid Saad Ajab Al Azemi
- Date of birth: July 28, 1986 (age 40)
- Place of birth: Kuwait City, Kuwait
- Height: 1.80 m (5 ft 11 in)
- Position: Forward

Youth career
- 2000–2004: Al Sahel

Senior career*
Years	Team	Apps	(Gls)
2005–2007	Al Sahel		
2007–2018	Al Kuwait		
2013	→ Al-Salmiyah (loan)		
2018	Qadsia		
2018–2019	Al-Jahra		

International career^{‡}
2006–2010	Kuwait U23		
2010–2015	Kuwait	6	(1)
- * Club domestic league appearances and goals as of November 5, 2016 ‡ National team caps and goals as of November 5, 2015

Khalid Ajab (Arabic: خالد عجب; born 28 July 1986) is a Kuwaiti former professional footballer who played as a forward.

== Personal life ==
Khalid brothers, Ahmad and Faisal, was also footballers.

== International goals ==
#	Date	Venue	Opponent	Score	Result	Competition
1	October 12, 2010	Kuwait City	Vietnam	3–1	Win	Friendly
