= Sami Abbod =

Yemeni footballer

Personal information
- Full name: Sami Karama Salem Abbod
- Position: Midfielder

Senior career*
Years	Team	Apps	(Gls)
2007–2015	Al-Tilal SC	46	

International career
2010	Yemen	6	(1)
Medal record
Winner	Yemeni President Cup	2010
- * Club domestic league appearances and goals

Sami Karama Salem Abbod is a Yemeni international footballer who played at 2011 AFC Asian Cup qualification. He played in all three games Yemen competed in, scoring a goal against Japan on 6 January 2010. Abbod was also a member of the Al-Tilal SC, who won the Yemeni President Cup in 2010.
