= Terry Holdbrooks =

American activist

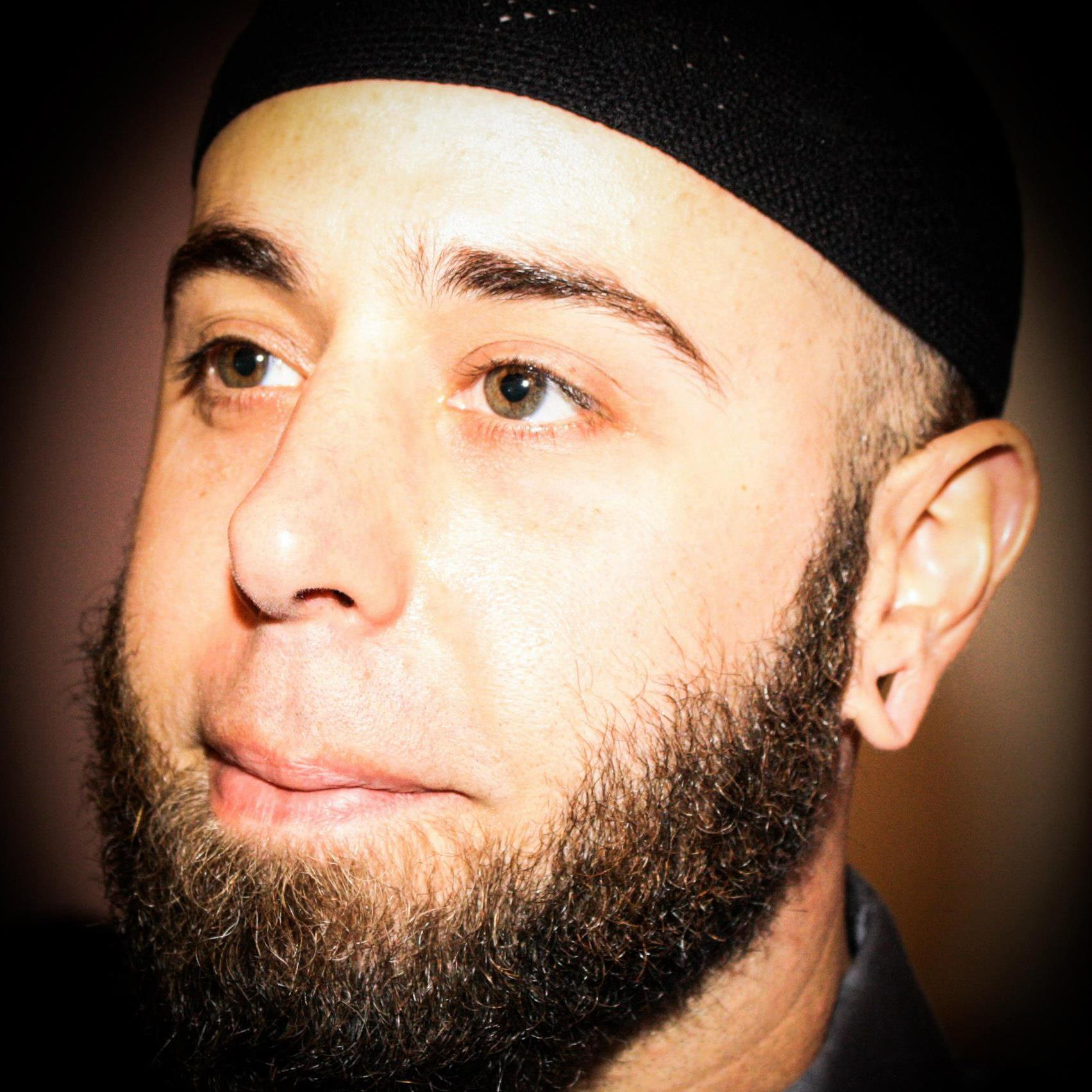
- Born: Terry Colin Holdbrooks Jr. July 7, 1983 (age 43); Phoenix, Arizona
- Other name: Mustafa Abdullah
- Occupations: Speaker, writer, student, volunteer

Terry Colin Holdbrooks Jr. (July 7, 1983) is an American soldier who worked as a guard at Guantanamo Bay detention camp (GTMO) from 2003 to 2004, where he converted to Islam six months into the job. After converting to Islam, he changed his name to Mustafa Abdullah. He left GTMO in 2004 and afterwards became an advocate for Guantanamo detainees, having called for the closing of GTMO.

== Biography ==
Terry Colin Holdbrooks Jr. was born on July 7, 1983, to Kelly and Terry Holdbrooks. He was raised in Phoenix, Arizona with his biological parents until the age of seven, when they separated. He then went on to live with his grandparents in Scottsdale, Arizona. He went to Saguaro High School, and graduated in 2001, after which he went to the Conservatory of Recording Arts. In August 2002, Terry enlisted in the US Army.

Holdbrooks was deployed to Guantánamo Bay detention camp (GTMO) in June 2003 where his work with the detainees led to him accepting Islam just six months into the job. He has written a book entitled Traitor? which discusses his time in GTMO and what he saw and did. He is an advocate of closing GTMO and relinquishing the land back to Cuba.

He left GTMO in 2004. Upon returning home, Holdbrooks began his further education and gained a degree from Arizona State University in sociology.
