= Mohammed Huwaidi Al-Hooti =

Omani footballer (born 1986)

Mohammed Huwaidi
Personal information
- Full name: Mohammed Huwaidi Al-Hooti
- Date of birth: 19 January 1986 (age 40)
- Place of birth: Oman
- Height: 1.80 m (5 ft 11 in)
- Position: Goalkeeper

Team information
- Current team: Al-Nahda
- Number: 1

Senior career*
Years	Team	Apps	(Gls)
2006–2010	Muscat	?	(0)
2011–2012	Al-Oruba	?	(0)
2012–2013	Ahli Sidab	?	(0)
2013	Al-Nahda	?	(0)

International career
2007–2012	Oman	16	(0)
- * Club domestic league appearances and goals

Mohammed Huwaidi Al-Hooti (Arabic: محمد هويدى الهوتي; born 19 January 1986), commonly known as Mohammed Huwaidi, is an Omani footballer who plays as a goalkeeper for Al-Nahda Club.

== Club career statistics ==
Club	Season	Division	League		Cup		Continental (Note: Includes appearances in the AFC Cup)		Other		Total	
Club	Season	Division	Apps	Goals	Apps	Goals	Apps	Goals	Apps	Goals	Apps	Goals
Al-Oruba	2010–11	Oman Professional League	-	0	-	0	6	0	-	0	-	0
Al-Oruba	2011–12	Oman Professional League	-	0	-	0	1	0	-	0	-	0
Al-Oruba	Total		-	0	-	0	7	0	-	0	-	0
Career total			-	0	-	0	7	0	-	0	-	0

== International career ==
Mohammed was selected for the national team for the first time in 2007. He has made appearances in the 2011 AFC Asian Cup qualification and the 20th Arabian Gulf Cup and has represented the national team in the 2010 FIFA World Cup qualification and the 2014 FIFA World Cup qualification.

== Honours ==
=== Club ===
- Omani Super Cup (1): 2011
