= Aref Thabit Al-Dali =

Yemeni footballer

Personal information
- Date of birth: October 2, 1987 (age 39)
- Position: Defender

Team information
- Current team: Al-Oruba
- Number: 5

Senior career*
Years	Team	Apps	(Gls)
2007–	Al-Oruba		

International career
2009–2010	Yemen	11	(0)
- * Club domestic league appearances and goals

Aref Thabit Al-Dali (born October 2, 1987) is a Yemeni professional footballer who plays for Yemeni League outfit Al-Oruba represented Yemen in the 2011 AFC Asian Cup qualification matches.
