= Majed Al-Amri =

Saudi Arabian footballer

Personal information
- Full name: Majed Rafe'e Abdulrahman Al-Amri
- Date of birth: 15 September 1985 (age 41)
- Place of birth: Saudi Arabia
- Height: 1.80 m (5 ft 11 in)
- Position: Defender

Senior career*
Years	Team	Apps	(Gls)
2005–2010	Al-Ettifaq		
2010–2012	Al-Shabab	12	(0)
2012–2014	Al-Ettifaq	21	(1)
2014–2015	Al-Shoulla FC	13	(1)
2015–2017	Al-Nahda		
2017–2018	Al-Kawkab		
2018–2020	Al-Thoqbah		
2020–2021	Al Jeel		
2021–2023	Al-Thoqbah		

International career
2007–2009	Saudi Arabia	2	(0)
- * Club domestic league appearances and goals

Majed Al Amri is a Saudi Arabian footballer who plays as a defender. He played for the Saudi Arabia national team in the 2007 Asian Cup.

He also played for Al Shabab and Al Ittifaq.
