= Rajab Hamza =

Qatari footballer (born 1986)

Personal information
- Full name: Rajab Hamza Qassim
- Date of birth: 16 October 1986 (age 40)
- Place of birth: Zanzibar, Tanzania
- Height: 1.86 m (6 ft 1 in)
- Position: Goalkeeper

Senior career*
Years	Team	Apps	(Gls)
2005–2006	Al Markhiya	?	(?)
2006–2007	Al Ahli	2	(0)
2007–2017	Al Arabi	162	(0)
2017–2019	Qatar SC	7	(0)
2019–2021	Al-Khor	6	(0)
2021–2022	Al-Shahania		

International career
2007–2011	Qatar	3	(0)
- * Club domestic league appearances and goals

Rajab Hamza Qassim (born 16 October 1986) is a former footballer who plays as a goalkeeper. Born in Tanzania, he represented the Qatar national team.

== Honours ==
Al-Arabi

- Sheikh Jassem Cup: 2008, 2010, 2011
