= 2011 AFC Asian Cup qualification =

Tournament details
- Dates: 9 April 2008 – 3 March 2010
- Teams: 24 (from 1 confederation)

Tournament statistics
- Matches played: 56
- Goals scored: 158 (2.82 per match)
- Top scorer: (Japan) Shinji Okazaki (6 goals)

The 2011 AFC Asian Cup qualification saw various countries take part to determine 10 spots to the final tournament in Qatar under the new qualification system set by the Asian Football Confederation (AFC).

Six other teams also qualified for the finals, even though they did not take part in the qualifiers:

- The host nation: Qatar;
- The top three finishers in the 2007 tournament: Iraq, Saudi Arabia and Korea Republic;
- The winner of the 2008 AFC Challenge Cup: India;
- The winner of the 2010 AFC Challenge Cup: Korea DPR.

== Qualified teams ==
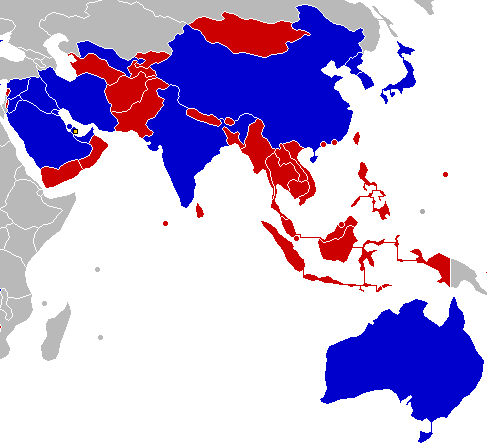
Final qualification status Team qualified for Asian Cup Team failed to qualify

Country	Qualified as	Date qualification was secured	Previous appearances in tournament^{1, 2}
Qatar	Hosts	29 July 2007	7 (1980, 1984, 1988, 1992, 2000, 2004, 2007)
Iraq	2007 AFC Asian Cup winner	25 July 2007	6 (1972, 1976, 1996, 2000, 2004, **2007**)
Saudi Arabia	2007 AFC Asian Cup runner-up	25 July 2007	7 (**1984**, **1988**, 1992, **1996**, 2000, 2004, 2007)
South Korea	2007 AFC Asian Cup third place	28 July 2007	11 (**1956**, **1960**, 1964, 1972, 1980, 1984, 1988, 1996, 2000, 2004, 2007)
India	2008 AFC Challenge Cup winner	13 August 2008	2 (1964, 1984)
Uzbekistan	Group C runner-up	18 November 2009	4 (1996, 2000, 2004, 2007)
Syria	Group D winner	18 November 2009	4 (1980, 1984, 1988, 1996)
Iran	Group E winner	6 January 2010	11 (**1968**, **1972**, **1976**, 1980, 1984, 1988, 1992, 1996, 2000, 2004, 2007)
China	Group D runner-up	6 January 2010	9 (1976, 1980, 1984, 1988, 1992, 1996, 2000, 2004, 2007)
Japan	Group A winner	6 January 2010	6 (1988, **1992**, 1996, **2000**, **2004**, 2007)
Bahrain	Group A runner-up	6 January 2010	3 (1988, 2004, 2007)
United Arab Emirates	Group C winner	6 January 2010	7 (1980, 1984, 1988, 1992, 1996, 2004, 2007)
North Korea	2010 AFC Challenge Cup winner	27 February 2010	2 (1980, 1992)
Australia	Group B winner	3 March 2010	1 (2007)
Kuwait	Group B runner-up	3 March 2010	8 (1972, 1976, **1980**, 1984, 1988, 1996, 2000, 2004)
Jordan	Group E runner-up	3 March 2010	1 (2004)

Notes:

^{1} Bold indicates champion for that year
^{2} Italic indicates host

== Seedings ==
On 6 December 2007, the Asian Football Confederation announced the seeding for the preliminary round of the 2011 tournament:

Automatic Qualifiers	Other Teams
1. Iraq; 2. Saudi Arabia; 3. South Korea	4. Japan; 5. Australia; 6. Iran; 7. Uzbekistan; 8. Vietnam; 9. China; 10. Thailand; 11. Indonesia; 12. United Arab Emirates; 13. Bahrain; 14. Oman; 15. Malaysia; 16. Jordan; 17. Syria; 18. Hong Kong; 19. Yemen; 20. Kuwait; 21. Singapore; 22. India**; 23. Lebanon; 24. North Korea*; 25. Myanmar*; 26. Maldives***; 27. Turkmenistan*

- Teams marked '*' withdrew prior to the draw. All of them participated in the 2008 and 2010 AFC Challenge Cup, and therefore had a chance to qualify via those two tournaments.
- India (marked '**') were drawn into Group C of the qualifiers, but withdrew from the qualifiers following their victory in the 2008 AFC Challenge Cup which automatically qualified them for the final tournament.
- Maldives (marked '***') were the only other team that entered the Asian Cup qualifiers who could also qualify via the 2010 AFC Challenge Cup, but they were eliminated from the Asian Cup qualifiers before the group stage.
- The following teams did not enter main qualification, but could qualify via the AFC Challenge Cups if they chose to enter:
- Afghanistan
- Bangladesh
- Bhutan
- Brunei
- Cambodia
- Chinese Taipei
- Guam
- Kyrgyzstan
- Laos
- Macau
- Mongolia
- Nepal
- Pakistan
- Palestine
- Philippines
- Sri Lanka
- Tajikistan
- Timor-Leste

== Preliminary round ==
The preliminary round reduced the number of non-automatic qualifiers to 20. Following the withdrawals of Korea DPR, Myanmar and Turkmenistan, only two teams were involved. The two lowest ranked AFC teams, Lebanon and Maldives, played home-and-away matches in April 2008. The away goals rule would be applied, and extra time and penalty shootout would be used to decide the winner if necessary. The winner of the preliminary round advanced to the qualifying round, where it was joined by the 19 teams seeded 4th to 22nd.

Team 1	Agg.	Team 2	1st leg	2nd leg
Lebanon	6–1	Maldives	4–0	2–1

9 April 2008
18:00 UTC+3

Lebanon	4–0	Maldives
El Ali 5'; Yaacoub 11'; Atwi 13' (pen.); Ghaddar 39'	Report

Camille Chamoun Sports City Stadium, Beirut
Attendance: 200
Referee: Naser Al-Ghafary (Jordan)

23 April 2008
16:00 UTC+5

Maldives	1–2	Lebanon
Shamweel Qasim 22'	Report	Korhani 9'; Al Jamal 75'

Rasmee Dhandu Stadium, Malé
Attendance: 6,000
Referee: Rosdi Shahrul (Malaysia)

Lebanon won 6–1 on aggregate and advanced to the group stage.

== Qualifying round ==
The 20 teams were divided into five groups of four. Teams played each other home and way in a round-robin format. The top two in each group advanced to the 2011 tournament where they were joined by the other qualifiers — Qatar, Iraq, Saudi Arabia, South Korea, India and North Korea.

=== Seedings ===
The following teams were drawn at this round:

Pot 1	Pot 2	Pot 3	Pot 4
Japan; Australia; Iran; Uzbekistan; Vietnam	China; Thailand; Indonesia; United Arab Emirates; Bahrain	Oman; Jordan; Syria; Malaysia; Hong Kong	Yemen; Kuwait; Singapore; India; Lebanon

=== Tiebreakers ===
The teams are ranked according to points (3 points for a win, 1 point for a tie, 0 points for a loss) and tie breakers are in following order:

1. Greater number of points obtained in the group matches between the teams concerned;
2. Goal difference resulting from the group matches between the teams concerned;
3. Greater number of goals scored in the group matches between the teams concerned;
4. Goal difference in all the group matches;
5. Greater number of goals scored in all the group matches;
6. Kicks from the penalty mark if only two teams are involved and they are both on the field of play;
7. Drawing of lots.

== Group A ==
Team	Pld	W	D	L	GF	GA	GD	Pts	(Japan)	(Bahrain)	(Yemen)	(Hong Kong)
Japan	6	5	0	1	17	4	+13	15	—	2–0	2–1	6–0
Bahrain	6	4	0	2	12	6	+6	12	1–0	—	4–0	4–0
Yemen	6	2	1	3	7	9	−2	7	2–3	3–0	—	1–0
Hong Kong	6	0	1	5	1	18	−17	1	0–4	1–3	0–0	—

Legend: Blue = home team win; Yellow = draw; Red = away team win.
20 January 2009
19:20 UTC+9

Japan	2–1	Yemen
Okazaki 7'; Tanaka 66'	Report	Al-Fadhli 47'

KKWing Stadium, Kumamoto
Attendance: 30,654
Referee: Tan Hai (China PR)
21 January 2009
19:30 UTC+8

Hong Kong	1–3	Bahrain
Cheng Siu Wai 90'	Report	Abdullatif 10'; Fatadi 37'; Salman Isa 87'

Hong Kong Stadium, Hong Kong
Attendance: 6,013
Referee: Vo Minh Tri (Vietnam)

28 January 2009
16:15 UTC+3

Yemen	1–0	Hong Kong
Al Selwi 52'	Report

Ali Muhesen Stadium, Sana'a
Attendance: 10,000
Referee: Abdullah Al Hilali (Oman)
28 January 2009
18:15 UTC+3

Bahrain	1–0	Japan
Salman Isa 24'	Report

National Stadium, Madinat 'Isa
Attendance: 11,200
Referee: Ravshan Irmatov (Uzbekistan)

8 October 2009
19:20 UTC+9

Japan	6–0	Hong Kong
Okazaki 17', 74', 76'; Nagatomo 28'; Nakazawa 50'; Túlio 67'	Report

Outsourcing Stadium, Shizuoka
Attendance: 16,028
Referee: Mohsen Torky (Iran)

18 November 2009
18:30 UTC+8

Hong Kong	0–4	Japan
	Report	Hasebe 32'; Satō 74'; S. Nakamura 84'; Okazaki 90+1' (pen.)

Hong Kong Stadium, Hong Kong
Attendance: 13,254
Referee: Peter Green (Australia)
18 November 2009
17:45 UTC+3

Bahrain	4–0	Yemen
Abdullatif 20'; Fatadi 28'; Salman 64'; Al-Dali 75' (o.g.)	Report

National Stadium, Madinat 'Isa
Attendance: 1,000
Referee: Mohsen Basma (Syria)

6 January 2010
16:15 UTC+3

Yemen	2–3	Japan
Al-Aqel 13'; Abbod 39'	Report	Hirayama 42', 55', 79'

Ali Muhesen Stadium, Sana'a
Attendance: 10,000
Referee: Ali Hamad Al-Badwawi (UAE)
6 January 2010
18:00 UTC+3

Bahrain	4–0	Hong Kong
Abdullatif 35', 40', 44'; Adnan 79'	Report

National Stadium, Madinat 'Isa
Attendance: 1,550
Referee: Abdullah Balideh (Qatar)

20 January 2010
16:15 UTC+3

Yemen	3–0	Bahrain
Al-Nono 5', 25'; Al Abidi 86'	Report

Ali Muhesen Stadium, Sana'a
Attendance: 7,000
Referee: Mohsen Torky (Iran)

3 March 2010
19:00 UTC+9

Japan	2–0	Bahrain
Okazaki 36'; Honda 90+2'	Report

Toyota Stadium, Toyota
Attendance: 38,042
Referee: Malik Abdul Bashir (Singapore)
3 March 2010
19:30 UTC+8

Hong Kong	0–0	Yemen
	Report

Hong Kong Stadium, Hong Kong
Attendance: 1,212
Referee: Vo Minh Tri (Vietnam)

== Group B ==
Team	Pld	W	D	L	GF	GA	GD	Pts	(Australia)	(Kuwait)	(Oman)	(Indonesia)
Australia	6	3	2	1	6	4	+2	11	—	0–1	1–0	1–0
Kuwait	6	2	3	1	6	5	+1	9	2–2	—	0–1	2–1
Oman	6	2	2	2	4	4	0	8	1–2	0–0	—	0–0
Indonesia	6	0	3	3	3	6	−3	3	0–0	1–1	1–2	—

Legend: Blue = home team win; Yellow = draw; Red = away team win.
19 January 2009
19:30 UTC+4

Oman	0–0	Indonesia
	Report

Sultan Qaboos Sports Complex, Muscat
Attendance: 13,000
Referee: Tayeb Hasan Shamsuzzaman (Bangladesh)

28 January 2009
19:30 UTC+7

Indonesia	0–0	Australia
	Report

Gelora Bung Karno Stadium, Jakarta
Attendance: 50,000
Referee: Malik Abdul Bashir (Singapore)
28 January 2009
18:00 UTC+3

Kuwait	0–1	Oman
	Report	Rabia 64'

Al-Sadaqua Walsalam Stadium, Kuwait City
Attendance: 22,000
Referee: Mohamed Omar Al Saeedi (United Arab Emirates)

5 March 2009
20:00 UTC+11

Australia	0–1	Kuwait
	Report	Neda 38'

Canberra Stadium, Canberra
Attendance: 20,032
Referee: Masoud Moradi (Iran)

14 October 2009
19:30 UTC+11

Australia	1–0	Oman
Cahill 74'	Report

Docklands Stadium, Melbourne
Attendance: 20,595
Referee: Maasaki Toma (Japan)

14 November 2009
18:00 UTC+4

Oman	1–2	Australia
Ayil 15' (pen.)	Report	Wilkshire 43'; Emerton 82'

Sultan Qaboos Sports Complex, Muscat
Attendance: 12,000
Referee: Sun Baojie (China)
14 November 2009
18:30 UTC+3

Kuwait	2–1	Indonesia
Al-Mutawa 61' (pen.), 87'	Report	Bambang 33'

Al Kuwait Sports Club Stadium, Kuwait City
Attendance: 16,000
Referee: Valentin Kovalenko (Uzbekistan)

18 November 2009
18:30 UTC+7

Indonesia	1–1	Kuwait
Budi 45+4'	Report	Ajab 72'

Gelora Bung Karno Stadium, Jakarta
Attendance: 36,000
Referee: Minoru Toju (Japan)

6 January 2010
18:30 UTC+7

Indonesia	1–2	Oman
Boaz 45'	Report	Bashir 32'; Sulaiman 52'

Gelora Bung Karno Stadium, Jakarta
Attendance: 45,000
Referee: Subkhiddin Mohd Salleh (Malaysia)
6 January 2010
17:30 UTC+3

Kuwait	2–2	Australia
Bandar 40'; Naser 44'	Report	Wilkshire 3'; Heffernan 5'

Al Kuwait Sports Club Stadium, Kuwait City
Attendance: 20,000
Referee: Ravshan Irmatov (Uzbekistan)

3 March 2010
19:00 UTC+10

Australia	1–0	Indonesia
Milligan 42'	Report

Suncorp Stadium, Brisbane
Attendance: 20,422
Referee: Kenji Ogiya (Japan)
3 March 2010
19:30 UTC+4

Oman	0–0	Kuwait
	Report

Sultan Qaboos Sports Complex, Muscat
Attendance: 27,000
Referee: Masoud Moradi (Iran)

== Group C ==
Team	Pld	W	D	L	GF	GA	GD	Pts	(United Arab Emirates)	(Uzbekistan)	(Malaysia)
United Arab Emirates	4	3	0	1	7	1	+6	9	—	0–1	1–0
Uzbekistan	4	3	0	1	7	3	+4	9	0–1	—	3–1
Malaysia	4	0	0	4	2	12	−10	0	0–5	1–3	—

Legend: Blue = home team win; Yellow = draw; Red = away team win.

Following their victory in the 2008 AFC Challenge Cup, India was given a bye to the final tournament and removed from this group prior to the first match. They were not replaced.

21 January 2009
20:45 UTC+8

Malaysia	0–5	United Arab Emirates
	Report	Omar 29', 45+1' (pen.); Matar 62', 76'; A. Khalil 85'

KLFA Stadium, Kuala Lumpur
Attendance: 10,000
Referee: Ben Williams (Australia)

28 January 2009
19:00 UTC+4

United Arab Emirates	0–1	Uzbekistan
	Report	F. Tadjiyev 30'

Al Sharjah Stadium
Attendance: 15,000
Referee: Yuichi Nishimura (Japan)

14 November 2009
16:00 UTC+5

Uzbekistan	3–1	Malaysia
Djeparov 46'; Geynrikh 57', 65'	Report	Zaquan Adha 68'

JAR Stadium, Tashkent
Attendance: 5,000
Referee: Masoud Moradi (Iran)

18 November 2009
17:30 UTC+8

Malaysia	1–3	Uzbekistan
Baddrol 73'	Report	Gafurov 33'; Nasimov 59'; Kapadze 74'

National Stadium, Kuala Lumpur
Attendance: 2,000
Referee: Tan Hai (China PR)

6 January 2010
19:00 UTC+4

United Arab Emirates	1–0	Malaysia
A. Khalil 90+3'	Report

Al Shabab Stadium, Dubai
Attendance: 3,500
Referee: Mohsen Basma (Syria)

3 March 2010
18:00 UTC+5

Uzbekistan	0–1	United Arab Emirates
	Report	Al Manhali 90+2'

Pakhtakor Markaziy Stadium, Tashkent
Attendance: 20,000
Referee: Tayeb Hasan Shamsuzzaman (Bangladesh)

== Group D ==
Team	Pld	W	D	L	GF	GA	GD	Pts	(Syria)	(China)	(Vietnam)	(Lebanon)
Syria	6	4	2	0	10	2	+8	14	—	3–2	0–0	4–0
China	6	4	1	1	13	5	+8	13	0–0	—	6–1	1–0
Vietnam	6	1	2	3	6	11	−5	5	0–1	1–2	—	3–1
Lebanon	6	0	1	5	2	13	−11	1	0–2	0–2	1–1	—

Legend: Blue = home team win; Yellow = draw; Red = away team win.
14 January 2009
19:00 UTC+7

Vietnam	3–1	Lebanon
Nguyễn Minh Phương 12'; Lê Công Vinh 30'; Nguyễn Vũ Phong 70'	Report	Moghrabi 75'

Mỹ Đình National Stadium, Hanoi
Attendance: 13,000
Referee: Masaaki Iemoto (Japan)
14 January 2009
14:00 UTC+2

Syria	3–2	China
Al Sayed 8' (pen.), 24'; Al Khatib 39' (pen.)	Report	Qu Bo 51'; Liu Jian 90+4'

Aleppo International Stadium, Aleppo
Attendance: 7,000
Referee: Mohsen Torky (Iran)

21 January 2009
19:35 UTC+8

China	6–1	Vietnam
Gao Lin 2', 20', 84'; Du Wei 27'; Jiang Ning 37'; Hao Junmin 47'	Report	Nguyễn Vũ Phong 11'

Yellow Dragon Sports Center, Hangzhou
Attendance: 15,300
Referee: Kim Dong-Jin (Korea Republic)
28 January 2009
17:00 UTC+2

Lebanon	0–2	Syria
	Report	J. Al Hussain 37'; Al Khatib 78'

Saida Municipal Stadium, Saida
Attendance: 300
Referee: Abdullah Balideh (Qatar)

14 November 2009
19:00 UTC+7

Vietnam	0–1	Syria
	Report	Rafe 90+4'

Mỹ Đình National Stadium, Hanoi
Attendance: 30,000
Referee: Ben Williams (Australia)
14 November 2009
17:00 UTC+2

Lebanon	0–2	China
	Report	Yu Hai 44'; Qu Bo 73'

Beirut Municipal Stadium, Beirut
Attendance: 2,000
Referee: Ali Hamad Al-Badwawi (UAE)

18 November 2009
14:00 UTC+2

Syria	0–0	Vietnam
	Report

Aleppo International Stadium, Aleppo
Attendance: 19,000
Referee: Abdullah Al Hilali (Oman)
22 November 2009
20:05 UTC+8

China	1–0	Lebanon
Du Wei 21'	Report

Yellow Dragon Sports Center, Hangzhou
Attendance: 21,520
Referee: Matthew Breeze (Australia)

6 January 2010
19:30 UTC+8

China	0–0	Syria
	Report

Yellow Dragon Sports Center, Hangzhou
Attendance: 29,570
Referee: Toma Maasaki (Japan)
6 January 2010
14:15 UTC+2

Lebanon	1–1	Vietnam
El Ali 20'	Report	Pham Thanh Luong 40'

Saida Municipal Stadium, Saida
Attendance: 50
Referee: Kovalenko Valentin (Uzbekistan)

17 January 2010
19:00 UTC+7

Vietnam	1–2	China
Lê Công Vinh 76' (pen.)	Report	Yang Xu 35'; Zhang Linpeng 43'

Mỹ Đình National Stadium, Hanoi
Attendance: 3,000
Referee: Malik Abdul Bashir (Singapore)
3 March 2010
15:00 UTC+2

Syria	4–0	Lebanon
Al Zeno 4'; Al Ahga 10'; J. Al Hussain 47'; A. Al Hussain 60'	Report

Abbasiyyin Stadium, Damascus
Attendance: 16,000
Referee: Kim Dong-Jin (Korea Republic)

== Group E ==
Team	Pld	W	D	L	GF	GA	GD	Pts	(Iran)	(Jordan)	(Thailand)	(Singapore)
Iran	6	4	1	1	11	2	+9	13	—	1–0	1–0	6–0
Jordan	6	2	2	2	4	4	0	8	1–0	—	0–0	2–1
Thailand	6	1	3	2	3	3	0	6	0–0	0–0	—	0–1
Singapore	6	2	0	4	6	15	−9	6	1–3	2–1	1–3	—

Legend: Blue = home team win; Yellow = draw; Red = away team win.
14 January 2009
15:00 UTC+3:30

Iran	6–0	Singapore
Gholamnejad 43'; Bagheri 52'; Rezaei 55'; Zare 80'; Nouri 82', 83'	Report

Azadi Stadium, Tehran
Attendance: 3,000
Referee: Mohamad Mansour (Lebanon)
14 January 2009
17:00 UTC+2

Jordan	0–0	Thailand
	Report

Amman International Stadium, Amman
Attendance: 5,000
Referee: Abdul-Rahman Rashu (Syria)

28 January 2009
19:30 UTC+8

Singapore	2–1	Jordan
Casmir 21'; Alam Shah 63'	Report	Aqel 41' (pen.)

National Stadium, Singapore
Attendance: 6,188
Referee: Peter Green (Australia)
28 January 2009
18:30 UTC+7

Thailand	0–0	Iran
	Report

Rajamangala Stadium, Bangkok
Attendance: 10,000
Referee: Valentin Kovalenko (Uzbekistan)

14 November 2009
19:30 UTC+8

Singapore	1–3	Thailand
Fahrudin 84' (pen.)	Report	Suksomkit 12' (pen.), 81'; Chaiman 75'

National Stadium, Singapore
Attendance: 22,183
Referee: Hiroyoshi Takayama (Japan)
14 November 2009
18:00 UTC+3:30

Iran	1–0	Jordan
Nekounam 72'	Report

Azadi Stadium, Tehran
Attendance: 15,000
Referee: Yuichi Nishimura (Japan)

18 November 2009
18:30 UTC+7

Thailand	0–1	Singapore
	Report	Đurić 38'

Rajamangala Stadium, Bangkok
Attendance: 30,000
Referee: Abdullah Balideh (Qatar)
22 November 2009
18:00 UTC+2

Jordan	1–0	Iran
Amer Deeb 78'	Report

King Abdullah Stadium, Amman
Attendance: 11,000
Referee: Ali Hamad Al-Badwawi (UAE)

6 January 2010
19:30 UTC+8

Singapore	1–3	Iran
Alam Shah 32'	Report	Aghili 11' (pen.); Madanchi 12'; Rezaei 63'

National Stadium, Singapore
Attendance: 7,356
Referee: Sun Baojie (China)
6 January 2010
19:00 UTC+7

Thailand	0–0	Jordan
	Report

Rajamangala Stadium, Bangkok
Attendance: 15,000
Referee: Ben Williams (Australia)

3 March 2010
19:30 UTC+3:30

Iran	1–0	Thailand
Nekounam 90'	Report

Azadi Stadium, Tehran
Attendance: 17,000
Referee: Abdullah Balideh (Qatar)
3 March 2010
18:00 UTC+2

Jordan	2–1	Singapore
Al-Saify 9'; Anas 60'	Report	Alam Shah 48'

King Abdullah Stadium, Amman
Attendance: 17,000
Referee: Abdul-Rahman Mohammad (Qatar)

== Goalscorers ==
6 goals

- (Japan) Shinji Okazaki

5 goals

- (Bahrain) Ismael Abdullatif

3 goals

- (China) Gao Lin
- (Japan) Sōta Hirayama
- (Singapore) Noh Alam Shah

2 goals

- (Australia) Luke Wilkshire
- (Bahrain) Salman Isa
- (Bahrain) Abdulla Baba Fatadi
- (China) Qu Bo
- (China) Du Wei
- (Iran) Mohammad Nouri
- (Iran) Gholamreza Rezaei
- (Iran) Javad Nekounam
- (Kuwait) Bader Al-Mutawa
- (Lebanon) Mahmoud El Ali
- (Syria) Maher Al Sayed
- (Syria) Firas Al Khatib
- (Syria) Jehad Al Hussein
- (Thailand) Sutee Suksomkit
- (United Arab Emirates) Mohamed Omer
- (United Arab Emirates) Ismail Matar
- (United Arab Emirates) Ahmad Khalil
- (Uzbekistan) Alexander Geynrikh
- (Vietnam) Nguyễn Vũ Phong
- (Vietnam) Lê Công Vinh
- (Yemen) Ali Al-Nono

1 goal

- (Australia) Tim Cahill
- (Australia) Dean Heffernan
- (Australia) Brett Emerton
- (Australia) Mark Milligan
- (Bahrain) Hussain Salman
- (Bahrain) Sayed Mohamed Adnan
- (China) Hao Junmin
- (China) Jiang Ning
- (China) Liu Jian
- (China) Yu Hai
- (China) Yang Xu
- (China) Zhang Linpeng
- (Hong Kong) Cheng Siu Wai
- (Indonesia) Bambang Pamungkas
- (Indonesia) Boaz Solossa
- (Indonesia) Budi Sudarsono
- (Iran) Majid Gholamnejad
- (Iran) Karim Bagheri
- (Iran) Maziar Zare
- (Iran) Hadi Aghili
- (Iran) Mehrzad Madanchi
- (Japan) Yuji Nakazawa
- (Japan) Marcus Túlio Tanaka
- (Japan) Yuto Nagatomo
- (Japan) Tatsuya Tanaka
- (Japan) Makoto Hasebe
- (Japan) Shunsuke Nakamura
- (Japan) Hisato Satō
- (Japan) Keisuke Honda
- (Jordan) Hatem Aqel
- (Jordan) Amer Deeb
- (Jordan) Odai Al-Saify
- (Jordan) Anas Bani Yaseen
- (Kuwait) Musaed Neda
- (Kuwait) Ahmad Ajab
- (Kuwait) Fayez Bandar
- (Kuwait) Yousef Nasser
- (Lebanon) Nasrat Al Jamal
- (Lebanon) Akram Moghrabi
- (Lebanon) Ali Yaacoub
- (Lebanon) Abbas Ahmed Atwi
- (Lebanon) Mohammed Ghaddar
- (Lebanon) Mohamad Korhani
- (Malaysia) Mohd Zaquan Adha
- (Malaysia) Baddrol Bakhtiar
- (Maldives) Shamweel Qasim
- (Oman) Khalifa Ayil
- (Oman) Hassan Rabia
- (Oman) Fawzi Bashir
- (Oman) Ismail Sulaiman
- (Singapore) Agu Casmir
- (Singapore) Mustafic Fahrudin
- (Singapore) Aleksandar Đurić
- (Syria) Abdelrazaq Al Hussain
- (Syria) Raja Rafe
- (Syria) Mohamed Al Zeno
- (Syria) Abdul Fattah Al Agha
- (Thailand) Therdsak Chaiman
- (United Arab Emirates) Sultan Bargash
- (Uzbekistan) Farhod Tadjiyev
- (Uzbekistan) Server Djeparov
- (Uzbekistan) Anvar Gafurov
- (Uzbekistan) Bahodir Nasimov
- (Uzbekistan) Timur Kapadze
- (Vietnam) Nguyễn Minh Phương
- (Vietnam) Phạm Thành Lương
- (Yemen) Sami Abbod
- (Yemen) Mohammed Al Abidi
- (Yemen) Basem Al-Aqel
- (Yemen) Zaher Farid Al-Fadhli
- (Yemen) Akram Al Selwi

1 own goal

- (Yemen) Aref Thabit Al-Dali (against Bahrain)
