= Sultan Bargash =

Emirati footballer (born 1989)

Personal information
- Full name: Sultan Saleh Bargash Jaralla Al Menhali
- Date of birth: 18 January 1989 (age 37)
- Place of birth: Abu Dhabi, UAE
- Height: 1.67 m (5 ft 6 in)
- Position: Midfielder

Youth career
- Al-Jazira

Senior career*
Years	Team	Apps	(Gls)
2009–2018	Al-Jazira		
2019	Hatta		
2020–2021	Baynounah		

International career
2008–2009	UAE Under-20	25	(1)
- * Club domestic league appearances and goals

Sultan Saleh Bargash Jaralla Al Menhali (born 18 January 1989) is an Emirati footballer who plays as a midfielder for the UAE Under-20.

== Career statistics ==
=== Club ===
Club	Season	League			Cup^{2}			Asia^{1}			Total		
Club	Season	Apps	Goals	Assists	Apps	Goals	Assists	Apps	Goals	Assists	Apps	Goals	Assists
Al-Jazira	2009–10	1	1	0	0	0	0	0	0	0	1	1	0
Al-Jazira	Total	1	1	0	0	0	0	0	0	0	1	1	0
Career totals		1	1	0	0	0	0	0	0	0	1	1	0

^{1}Continental competitions include the AFC Champions League
^{2}Other tournaments include the UAE President Cup and Etisalat Emirates Cup

=== National team ===
As of 27 September 2009

Team	Season	Cup^{2}			Asia^{1}			Total		
Team	Season	Apps	Goals	Assists	Apps	Goals	Assists	Apps	Goals	Assists
UAE U20	2009	4	0	0	0	0	0	0	0	0
UAE U20	Total	0	0	0	0	0	0	0	0	0
Career totals		0	0	0	0	0	0	0	0	0

^{1}Continental competitions include the AFC U-19 Championship
^{2}Other tournaments include the FIFA U-20 World Cup

== International goals ==
No.	Date	Venue	Opponent	Score	Result	Competition
1.	3 March 2010	Pakhtakor Central Stadium, Tashkent, Uzbekistan	Uzbekistan	1–0	1–0	2011 AFC Asian Cup qualification
