= Zaher Farid Al-Fadhli =

Yemeni footballer

Personal information
- Date of birth: 6 July 1986 (age 40)
- Position: Defender

Team information
- Current team: Al-Wehda SC (Aden)

Senior career*
Years	Team	Apps	(Gls)
2002–2010	Hassan Abyan		
2010–2011	Al-Tilal Aden		
2011–2012	Al-Wehda SC (Aden)		
2013–2014	Shaab Ibb		
2014–	Al-Wehda SC (Aden)		

International career
2007–2012	Yemen	27	(0)
- * Club domestic league appearances and goals

Zaher Farid Al-Fadhli (Arabic: زاهر فريد الفضلي, born 6 July 1986) is a Yemeni footballer who played for the Yemen national football team. He was part of the Yemeni squad at the 2011 AFC Asian Cup qualification.
