= Abdulla Baba Fatadi =

Bahraini footballer (born 1985)

Personal information
- Full name: Abdulla Baba Fatadi
- Birth name: Babatunde Fatai
- Date of birth: 2 November 1985 (age 41)
- Place of birth: Lagos, Nigeria
- Height: 1.76 m (5 ft 9 in)
- Position: Midfielder

Youth career
- 2000–2002: Osaka FC Lagos

Senior career*
Years	Team	Apps	(Gls)
2002–2004	Al Najma Club	31	(13)
2004–2006	Al Ahli Club	28	(12)
2006–2008	Muharraq Club	30	(14)
2008–2009	Al-Kharitiyath S.C.	23	(2)
2009–2010	Neuchâtel Xamax	17	(1)
2010–2011	Ittihad Kalba	10	(0)
2011	Al-Qadisiyah FC	10	(1)
2011–2012	Al Jahra	19	(3)
2012–2013	Al-Shoalah	11	(0)
2014–2015	Al-Mesaimeer	16	(13)
Total		179	(46)

International career^{‡}
2007–2012	Bahrain	46	(8)
- * Club domestic league appearances and goals as of 1 August 2011 ‡ National team caps and goals as of 17 October 2011

Abdulla Baba Fatadi (born 2 November 1985) is a former footballer who played as a midfielder. Born as Babatunde Fatai in Lagos, Nigeria, he represented Bahrain at international level.

== International goals ==
#	Date	Venue	Opponent	Score	Result	Competition
	21 October 2007	Manama, Bahrain	Malaysia	4–1	Won	2010 FIFA World Cup qualification
	16 January 2007	Manama, Bahrain	Kuwait	1–0	Won	Friendly
	26 January 2008	Manama, Bahrain	Yemen	2–1	Won	Friendly
	10 September 2008	Doha, Qatar	Qatar	1–1	Drew	2010 FIFA World Cup qualification
	21 January 2009	Hong Kong	Hong Kong	3–1	Won	2011 AFC Asian Cup qualification
	23 March 2009	Manama, Bahrain	Zimbabwe	5–2	Won	Friendly
	18 November 2009	Manama, Bahrain	Yemen	4–0	Won	2011 AFC Asian Cup qualification
	29 November 2011	Aden, Yemen	United Arab Emirates	1–3	Lost	20th Arabian Gulf Cup
