= Fayez Bandar =

Kuwaiti footballer

Personal information
- Full name: Fayez Bandar Al-Enezi
- Date of birth: December 7, 1983 (age 42)
- Place of birth: Kuwait
- Height: 1.79 m (5 ft 10 in)
- Position: Centre back

Senior career*
| Years | Team | Apps | (Gls) |
| 2000–2004 | Al-Sulaibikhat | | |
| 2004–2011 | Al Qadsia | | |
| 2012–2014 | Al-Salmiya | | |

International career
| 2007–2008 | Kuwait | 2 | (0) |
- * Club domestic league appearances and goals

Fayez Bandar (born December 7, 1983) is a Kuwaiti footballer (defender) playing currently for Al Qadisiya Kuwait and Kuwait national football team.
