= Ahmad Ajab =

Kuwaiti footballer

Personal information
- Full name: Ahmad Saad Ajab Al-Azmi
- Date of birth: May 13, 1984 (age 42)
- Place of birth: Kuwait City, Kuwait
- Height: 1.81 m (5 ft 11 in)
- Position: Striker

Youth career
- Al Sahel

Senior career*
Years	Team	Apps	(Gls)
2003–2007	Al-Sahel	54	(34)
2007–2015	Al-Qadisia	140	(56)
2009	→ Al-Shabab (loan)	6	(1)
2012–2013	→ Al-Salmiya (loan)	7	(1)
2014	→ Al-Nasr (loan)	6	(1)
Total		213	(93)

International career^{‡}
2005–2013	Kuwait	36	(17)
- * Club domestic league appearances and goals as of 4 November 2014 ‡ National team caps and goals as of 8 November 2013

Ahmad Saad Ajab Al-Azmi (Arabic: أَحْمَد سَعْد عَجَب الْعَازِمِيّ; born 13 May 1984) is a Kuwaiti footballer. After starting playing for Al-Sahel he moved to Al-Qadisia in July 2007.

== Career ==
After moving to his new club, he became the top scorer in 2007 in the Kuwaiti Premier League. He was called up for the national team, and he scored a hat-trick on his debut against Lebanon. Coming off the bench after 50 minutes gone, the score was 2–0 Lebanon. His hat-trick won the game 3-2. He is currently in competition to be the World's top scorer and Asia's Best Player of the Year. He helped his team to reach the second round of the AFC champions league.

== International goals ==
Scores and results list Kuwait's goal tally first.

#	Date	Venue	Opponent	Score	Result	Competition
1.	2 January 2008	Thamir Stadium, Al Salmiya	Lebanon	1–2	3–2	Friendly
2.	2 January 2008	Thamir Stadium, Al Salmiya	Lebanon	2–2	3–2	Friendly
3.	2 January 2008	Thamir Stadium, Al Salmiya	Lebanon	3–2	3–2	Friendly
4.	30 January 2008	Sultan Qaboos Sports Complex, Muscat	Oman	1–1	1–1	Friendly
5.	26 March 2008	Al Kuwait Sports Club Stadium, Kuwait City	Iran	1–2	2–2	2010 FIFA World Cup qualifier
6.	23 May 2008	Jassim Bin Hamad Stadium, Doha	Qatar	1–0	1–1	Friendly
7.	27 May 2008	Prince Mohamed bin Fahd Stadium, Dammam	Saudi Arabia	1–1	1–2	Friendly
8.	8 June 2008	Thamir Stadium, Al Salmiya	Syria	1–0	4–2	2010 FIFA World Cup qualifier
9.	8 June 2008	Thamir Stadium, Al Salmiya	Syria	2–1	4–2	2010 FIFA World Cup qualifier
10.	8 June 2008	Thamir Stadium, Al Salmiya	Syria	4–2	4–2	2010 FIFA World Cup qualifier
11.	14 June 2008	Thamir Stadium, Al Salmiya	United Arab Emirates	1–2	2–3	2010 FIFA World Cup qualifier
12.	14 June 2008	Thamir Stadium, Al Salmiya	United Arab Emirates	2–2	2–3	2010 FIFA World Cup qualifier
13.	18 November 2009	Gelora Bung Karno Stadium, Jakarta	Indonesia	1–1	1–1	2011 AFC Asian Cup qualifier
14.	19 February 2010	Al Nahyan Stadium, Abu Dhabi	Syria	1–1	1–1	Friendly
15.	8 October 2010	Jaber Al-Ahmad International Stadium, Kuwait City	Bahrain	1–3	1–3	Friendly
16.	12 October 2010	Jaber Al-Ahmad International Stadium, Kuwait City	Vietnam	1–1	3–1	Friendly
17.	8 November 2013	Jaber Al-Ahmad International Stadium, Kuwait City	Malaysia	3–0	3–0	Friendly

== Personal life ==
Ahmad brothers, Khalid and Faisal, was also footballers.
