= 2011–12 Al-Oruba F.C. season =

Al-Oruba
2011–12 season
- Chairman: (Yemen) Yahya Mohammed
- Manager: (Yemen)
- League: 3rd
- Super Cup: Winner
- AFC Cup: Group stage
- Top goalscorer: League: Shaaban Naggar (14); All: Shaaban Naggar (16)
Home colours	Away colours

The 2011–12 Al-Oruba F.C. season is the Al-Oruba Football Club of Yemen season from 2011–2012 season.

== Current first team squad ==
Note: Flags indicate national team as defined under FIFA eligibility rules; some limited exceptions apply. Players may hold more than one non-FIFA nationality.

No.	Pos.	Nation	Player
1	GK	YEM	Muaadh Abdulkhalek (captain)
2	DF	YEM	Abdulkareem Al-Weshah
3	DF	YEM	Ammar Zaidan
4	DF	YEM	Ammar Ba-Abood
5	DF	YEM	Aref AL-Dali
6	DF	YEM	Mohammed AL-Dughish
7	MF	YEM	Haithm Thabit
8	MF	YEM	Hisham Al-Asbahi
9	MF	YEM	Kamal AL-Hamdani
10	FW	YEM	Yaser Al-Gabr
11	DF	YEM	Ahmed AL-Dhaheri
13	DF	YEM	Aiman AL-Matari
14	MF	NGR	Effiong Duke
15	DF	YEM	Adnan AL-Kubati

No.	Pos.	Nation	Player
16	FW	YEM	Abdulelah Sharyan
17	FW	YEM	Yousef AL-Sayadi
18	MF	YEM	Basheer AL-Manifi
19	FW	EGY	Shaaban Naggar
20	MF	YEM	Hussein Al-Ghazi
21	DF	NGR	Adisa Alao
22	GK	YEM	Marwan AL-Areqi
23	DF	YEM	Wasim Al-Qaar
24	MF	YEM	Helal AL-Bukhaiti
25	GK	YEM	Talal AL-Hubaishi
26	DF	YEM	Ameen AL-Sabahi
27	MF	YEM	Gamal AL-Dhaibani
28	FW	ETH	Mamado Sultan
29	MF	JOR	Musa Hammad

== Yemeni League ==
Pos	Team	Pld	W	D	L	GF	GA	GD	Pts	Qualification or relegation
1	Al Sha'ab Ibb	26	13	9	4	39	20	+19	48	Championship playoff
2	Al-Ittihad Ibb	26	14	6	6	28	20	+8	48	Championship playoff
3	Al-Oruba Zabid	26	13	7	6	38	20	+18	46	
4	Al-Ahli San'a'	26	12	7	7	34	29	+5	43	
5	Al-Hilal Al-Sahili	26	11	7	8	31	30	+1	40	

Updated to match(es) played on 16 July 2011. Source: goalzz.com
Rules for classification: 1) points; 2) goal difference; 3) number of goals scored.

=== Matches ===
Win Draw Loss

=== Results ===
Kickoff times are in GMT.

28 December 2011	Al-Tilal	0 - 0	Al-Oruba	May 22, Aden
TBC UTC+08:30

6 January 2012	Al-Sha'ab Ibb	1 - 1	Al-Oruba	22 May Stadium, Ibb
TBC UTC+08:30	Al Hagri 43'	Summary	Naggar 93'

12 January 2012	Al-Oruba	2 - 1	Al-Shabab	Al Sha'ab San'a, San'a
TBC UTC+08:30	Sharyan 30' 50'	Summary	Amowas 40'

20 January 2012	Al-Shula	1 - 0	Al-Oruba	Al Shula Stadium, Aden
TBC UTC+08:30	Al-Hebh 49'	Summary

27 January 2012	Al-Oruba	1 - 2	Al-Ahli San'a'	Al Sha'ab San'a, San'a
TBC UTC+08:45	Mamado 88'	Summary	Al-Khaiat 36'; Al Nono 83'

3 February 2012	Al-Oruba	2 - 0	Al-Tali'aa	Al Sha'ab San'a, San'a
TBC UTC+08:45	Naggar 48'; Mamado 85'	Summary

10 February 2012	Al-Hilal	0 - 3	Al-Oruba	Al Ulufi, Al Hudaydah
TBC UTC+08:45		Summary	Sharyan 41'; Naggar 58' 81'

24 February 2012	Al-Oruba	2 - 1	Najm Sba	Al Sha'ab San'a, San'a
TBC UTC+08:45	Naggar 40'; Al-Gabr 75'	Summary	Atiah 60'

11 March 2012	Al-Oruba	2 - 3	Al-Sha'ab Hadramaut	Al Sha'ab San'a, San'a
TBC UTC+08:45	Naggar 19'; Al-Gabr 76'	Summary	Al-Kalady 16'; BaHaaj 27' 32'

16 March 2012	Al-Oruba	1 - 2	Al-Wahda Aden	Al Sha'ab San'a, San'a
TBC UTC+08:45	Naggar 19'	Summary	Karama 63'; Nader 89'

25 March 2012	Al Sha'ab Sana'a	1 - 2	Al-Oruba	Al Sha'ab San'a, San'a
TBC UTC+08:45	Al-Baadani 43' (pen.)	Summary	Al-Gabr 3' 51'

29 March 2012	Al-Oruba	0 - 1	Al-Ittihad Ibb	Al Sha'ab San'a, San'a
TBC UTC+08:45		Summary	Al-Sabahi 83'

16 April 2012	Al-Ahli Taizz	0 - 2	Al-Oruba	Ta'izz
TBC UTC+08:45		Summary	Adisa 75'; Naggar 80'

30 April 2011	Al-Oruba	1 - 0	Al-Tilal	Al Sha'ab San'a, San'a
TBC UTC+09:00	Al-Gabr 72'	Summary

4 May 2012	Al-Oruba	2 - 1	Al-Sha'ab Ibb	Al Sha'ab San'a, San'a
TBC UTC+08:45	AL-Dali 60'; Al-Gabr 94'	Summary	Jzelan 43'

14 May 2012	Al-Shabab	1 - 3	Al-Oruba	Al Hadika Stadium, Al Bayda
TBC UTC+08:45	Abood 40'	Summary	Moses 36'; Naggar 58'; Duke 91'

18 May 2012	Al-Oruba	1 - 1	Al-Shula	Al Sha'ab San'a, San'a
TBC UTC+08:45	Al-Ghazi	Summary	Al-Shawsh

25 May 2012	Al-Ahli San'a'	0 - 0	Al-Oruba	Al Ahly Stadium, San'a
TBC UTC+08:45		Summary

1 June 2012	Al-Tali'aa	0 - 0	Al-Oruba	Al Shohada Stadium Taizz
TBC UTC+08:45		Summary

8 June 2012	Al-Oruba	4 – 1	Al-Hilal	Al Sha'ab San'a, San'a
TBC UTC+08:45	Duke 19'; AL-Dhaibani 59'; Naggar 82'; Sharyan 90'	Summary	Basuhai 41'

15 June 2012	Najm Sba	0 – 3	Al-Oruba	Dhamar Stadium, Dhamar
TBC UTC+08:45		Summary	Naggar 8'; Sharyan 71'; Duke 87'

22 June 2012	Al-Oruba	3 – 0	Al-Ahli Taizz	Al Sha'ab San'a, San'a
TBC UTC+08:45	Sharyan 75'; Naggar 82'; AL-Dhaibani 88'	Summary

1 July 2012	Al-Sha'ab Hadramaut	1 - 1	Al-Oruba	Al Shahet Stadium, Hadramaut
TBC UTC+09:00	Obaidy 44'	Summary	Bassem 48'

6 July 2012	Al-Wahda Aden	1 - 1	Al-Oruba	Al Wahdat Stadium, Aden
TBC UTC+08:45	Al-Haithmi 70'	Summary	Naggar 78'

10 July 2012	Al-Oruba	1 - 0	Al Sha'ab Sana'a	Al Sha'ab San'a, San'a
TBC UTC+08:45	Naggar	Summary

15 July 2012	Al-Ittihad Ibb	v	Al-Oruba	Ibb
TBC UTC+08:45

== Yemeni Super Cup ==
22 December 2011	Al-Tilal	0 - 1	Al-Oruba	Ali Muhesen, San'a
TBC UTC+09:00		Summary	Adisa 14'

== AFC Cup ==
=== Group stage ===
Team	Pld	W	D	L	GF	GA	GD	Pts	ERB	KAZ	ORU	KEB
(Iraq) Erbil	6	4	2	0	11	5	+6	14		1–1	2–1	2–0
(Kuwait) Kazma	6	3	2	1	10	6	+4	11	1–2		1–1	3–0
(Yemen) Al-Oruba	6	2	2	2	10	8	+2	8	2–2	1–2		4–1
(India) East Bengal	6	0	0	6	2	14	−12	0	0–2	1–2	0–1	

Source: RSSSF
Legend: Blue = home team win; Yellow = draw; Red = away team win.

6 March 2012	(India) East Bengal	0 - 1	Al-Oruba	Salt Lake Stadium, Kolkata
15:00 UTC+05:30		Report	Adisa 45+1' (pen.)	Attendance: 10,000; Referee: Shamsuzzaman Tayeb Hasan (Bangladesh)

20 March 2012	Al-Oruba	2 – 2	(Iraq) Arbil	Franso Hariri Stadium, Arbil (Iraq)
16:00 UTC+03:00	Naggar 66', 87'	Report	Sabagh 42'; Radhi 54'	Attendance: 10,000; Referee: Yaqoob Abdul Baki (Oman)

4 April 2012	Al-Oruba	1 - 2	(Kuwait) Kazma	Al-Sadaqua Walsalam Stadium, Kuwait City (Kuwait)
17:25 UTC+03:00	Abdulkareem 34'	Report	Nasser 74' (pen.); Faraj 85'	Attendance: 324; Referee: Vladislav Tseytlin (Uzbekistan)

10 April 2012	Kazma (Kuwait)	1 - 1	Al-Oruba	Al-Sadaqua Walsalam Stadium, Kuwait City (Kuwait)
18:45 UTC+03:00	Nasser 86'	Report	Adisa 57' (pen.)	Attendance: 500; Referee: Sukhbir Singh (Singapore)

25 April 2012	Al-Oruba	4 – 1	(India) East Bengal	Prince Mohammed Stadium, Zarqa (Jordan)^{2}
16:00 UTC+03:00	Duke 6', 34'; Sharyan 59'; Al-Gabr 71'	Report	Edmilson 78'	Attendance: 600; Referee: Khurram Shahzad (Pakistan)

9 May 2012	Arbil (Iraq)	2 – 1	Al-Oruba	Franso Hariri Stadium, Arbil
18:30 UTC+03:00	Karim 32'; Radhi 62'	Report	Al-Ghazi 12'	Attendance: 6,000; Referee: Naser Al Ghafari (Jordan)

Notes

Due to the political crisis in Yemen, the AFC requested Yemeni clubs to play their home matches at neutral venues.

== Statistics ==
=== Goals ===
R	Player	Position	League	AFC	Super	Total
1	(Egypt) Shaaban Naggar	CF	14	2	0	16
2	(Yemen) Yaser Al-Gabr	CF	6	1	0	7
3	(Yemen) Abdulelah Sharyan	CF	6	1	0	7
4	(Nigeria) Effiong Duke	AM	3	2	0	5
5	(Nigeria) Alao Fatai Adisa	CB	1	2	1	4
6	(Yemen) Hussein Al-Ghazi	MF	1	1	0	2
7	(Yemen) Gamal AL-Dhaibani	MF	2	0	0	2
8	(Ethiopia) Mamado Sultan	CF	2	0	0	2
9	(Yemen) Al-Weshah	CB	0	1	0	1
10	(Yemen) Aref AL-Dali	CB	1	0	0	1
11	(Jordan) Musa Hammad	MF	1	0	0	1

== See also ==
- 2010–11 season
