= 2003 FIFA U-17 World Championship =

2003 FIFA U-17 World Cup
Jalkapallon alle 17-vuotiaiden maailmanmestaruuskilpailut 2003 U17-världsmästerskapet i fotboll 2003

Tournament details
- Host country: Finland
- Dates: 13–30 August
- Teams: 16 (from 6 confederations)
- Venues: 4 (in 4 host cities)

Final positions
- Champions: Brazil (3rd title)
- Runners-up: Spain
- Third place: Argentina
- Fourth place: Colombia

Tournament statistics
- Matches played: 32
- Goals scored: 117 (3.66 per match)
- Attendance: 183,616 (5,738 per match)
- Top scorer(s): (Colombia) Carlos Hidalgo (Portugal) Manuel Curto (Spain) Cesc Fàbregas (5 goals each)
- Best player: (Spain) Cesc Fàbregas
- Fair play award: Costa Rica

The 2003 FIFA U-17 World Championship, was the tenth edition of FIFA U-17 World Championship. It was held in the cities of Helsinki, Tampere, Lahti and Turku in Finland from 13 to 30 August 2003. Players born after 1 January 1986 could participate in this tournament. Some controversy followed the tournament after a number of players from the Sierra Leone squad defected to Finland.

== Teams ==
Confederation	Qualifying Tournament	Qualifier(s)
AFC (Asia)	2002 AFC U-17 Championship	South Korea; Yemen^{1} China
CAF (Africa)	2003 African U-17 Championship	Cameroon^{1} Sierra Leone^{1} Nigeria
CONCACAF (North, Central America & Caribbean)	2003 CONCACAF U-17 Tournament	United States; Costa Rica; Mexico
CONMEBOL (South America)	2003 South American U-17 Championship	Argentina; Brazil; Colombia
OFC (Oceania)	2003 OFC U-17 Championship	Australia
UEFA (Europe)	Host nation	Finland^{1}
UEFA (Europe)	2003 UEFA European Under-17 Championship	Portugal; Spain

1.Teams that made their debut.

== Venues ==
The tournament was played in four cities in Finland: Helsinki, Turku, Tampere and Lahti.

2003 FIFA U-17 World Championship (Finland)
2003 FIFA U-17 World Championship (Finland)	Helsinki	Turku	Tampere	Lahti
2003 FIFA U-17 World Championship (Finland)	Finnair Stadium	Veritas Stadion	Tampere Stadium	Lahti Stadium
2003 FIFA U-17 World Championship (Finland)	Töölö Stadium	Turku Stadium	Ratina Stadium (Tampere Stadium)	Lahti Stadium

== Squads ==
For a list of the squads see 2003 FIFA U-17 World Championship squads

== Group stage ==
All times are local (EEST/UTC+3)

=== Group A ===
Team	Pld	W	D	L	GF	GA	GD	Pts
Colombia	3	2	1	0	11	2	+9	7
Mexico	3	1	2	0	5	3	+2	5
Finland	3	1	0	2	3	12	–9	3
China	3	0	1	2	5	7	–2	1

13 August 2003
17:30

Finland	2–1	China
Parikka 6'; Petrescu 64'	Report	Jiang Chen 4'

Töölö Stadium, Helsinki
Attendance: 8,344
Referee: Heber Lopes (Brazil)

13 August 2003
20:00

Mexico	0–0	Colombia
	Report

Töölö Stadium, Helsinki
Attendance: 3,500
Referee: Martin Hansson (Sweden)

16 August 2003
15:00

China	1–2	Colombia
Wang Yongpo 67'	Report	Guarín 73' (pen.); Hernández 80'

Töölö Stadium, Helsinki
Attendance: 4,100
Referee: Richard Piper (Trinidad and Tobago)

16 August 2003
17:30

Finland	0–2	Mexico
	Report	Ceja 39'; Herrera 51'

Töölö Stadium, Helsinki
Attendance: 10,176
Referee: Eric Braamhaar (Netherlands)

19 August 2003
17:30

China	3–3	Mexico
Wang Yongpo 35'; Jiang Chen 61', 81'	Report	Flores 51'; Mariaca 73'; Murguía 78'

Töölö Stadium, Helsinki
Attendance: 4,500
Referee: Jerome Damon (South Africa)

19 August 2003
20:00

Colombia	9–1	Finland
Hidalgo 16', 32' (pen.), 50', 61'; Ramos 36', 68', 71'; Guarín 63'; Núñez 74'	Report	Petrescu 41'

Töölö Stadium, Helsinki
Attendance: 10,200
Referee: Gabriel Brazenas (Argentina)

=== Group B ===
Team	Pld	W	D	L	GF	GA	GD	Pts
Argentina	3	3	0	0	5	0	+5	9
Costa Rica	3	1	1	1	3	3	0	4
Nigeria	3	1	1	1	3	3	0	4
Australia	3	0	0	3	1	6	–5	0

Note: Second place was determined by drawing of lots

13 August 2003
17:30

Argentina	2–0	Australia
Garay 6'; Cólzera 69'	Report

Turku Stadium, Turku
Attendance: 4,124
Referee: Eric Braamhaar (Netherlands)

13 August 2003
20:00

Costa Rica	1–1	Nigeria
Arias 83'	Report	Bala 9'

Turku Stadium, Turku
Attendance: 4,292
Referee: Leone Rakaroi (Fiji)

16 August 2003
15:00

Australia	1–2	Nigeria
Giraldi 2'	Report	Mikel 73'; Bala 84'

Turku Stadium, Turku
Attendance: 5,502
Referee: Heber Lopes (Brazil)

16 August 2003
17:30

Argentina	2–0	Costa Rica
Peirone 84', 90'	Report

Turku Stadium, Turku
Attendance: 5,462
Referee: Jerome Damon (South Africa)

19 August 2003
17:30

Nigeria	0–1	Argentina
	Report	Faurlín 59'

Turku Stadium, Turku
Attendance: 6,104
Referee: Martin Hansson (Sweden)

19 August 2003
20:00

Australia	0–2	Costa Rica
	Report	Rodríguez 62' (pen.); Salazar 75'

Turku Stadium, Turku
Attendance: 5,424
Referee: Khalil Al-Ghamdi (Saudi Arabia)

=== Group C ===
Team	Pld	W	D	L	GF	GA	GD	Pts
Brazil	3	2	1	0	9	1	+8	7
Portugal	3	1	1	1	9	13	–4	4
Cameroon	3	0	3	0	7	7	0	3
Yemen	3	0	1	2	4	8	–4	1

14 August 2003
17:30

Yemen	3–4	Portugal
Al-Badani 31'; Sharyan 45+2'; Sousa 77' (o.g.)	Report	Sousa 56'; Curto 68'; M. Fernandes 80'; Al-Safi 82' (o.g.)

Ratina Stadium, Tampere
Attendance: 6,400
Referee: Ravshan Irmatov (Uzbekistan)

14 August 2003
20:00

Cameroon	1–1	Brazil
Joseph Mawaye 5'	Report	Abuda 38'

Ratina Stadium, Tampere
Attendance: 8,250
Referee: Marco Rodríguez (Mexico)

17 August 2003
15:00

Portugal	0–5	Brazil
	Report	Léo 20'; Abuda 52'; Ederson 68' (pen.); Evandro 77'; Thyago 86'

Ratina Stadium, Tampere
Attendance: 10,190
Referee: Gabriel Brazenas (Argentina)

17 August 2003
17:30

Yemen	1–1	Cameroon
Juaim 90+2'	Report	Mawaye 74'

Ratina Stadium, Tampere
Attendance: 6,855
Referee: Eddy Maillet (Seychelles)

20 August 2003
17:30

Brazil	3–0	Yemen
Evandro 28', 32'; Arouca 86'	Report

Ratina Stadium, Tampere
Attendance: 5,896
Referee: Marco Rodríguez (Mexico)

20 August 2003
20:00

Portugal	5–5	Cameroon
Vieirinha 21'; Curto 36', 43', 44'; Gama 52'	Report	T. Costa 70' (o.g.); N'Gal 74', 76'; N'Guémo 88'; Mbia 90+4'

Ratina Stadium, Tampere
Attendance: 4,723
Referee: Eric Braamhaar (Netherlands)

=== Group D ===
Team	Pld	W	D	L	GF	GA	GD	Pts
Spain	3	2	1	0	8	5	+3	7
United States	3	2	0	1	8	4	+4	6
South Korea	3	1	0	2	6	11	–5	3
Sierra Leone	3	0	1	2	6	8	–2	1

14 August 2003
17:30

South Korea	1–6	United States
Owens 11' (o.g.)	Report	Adu 16', 89', 90+2' (pen.); Owens 26'; Watson 54'; Curfman 75'

Lahti Stadium, Lahti
Attendance: 3,240
Referee: Eddy Maillet (Seychelles)

14 August 2003
20:00

Spain	3–3	Sierra Leone
Rodríguez 8'; Sisi 15'; Nadal 90+6'	Report	Barlay 34', 73'; Ruz 36' (o.g.)

Lahti Stadium, Lahti
Attendance: 3,150
Referee: Khalil Al-Ghamdi (Saudi Arabia)

17 August 2003
15:00

United States	2–1	Sierra Leone
González 45' (pen.); Adu 89'	Report	Sesay 32'

Lahti Stadium, Lahti
Attendance: 4,950
Referee: Ravshan Irmatov (Uzbekistan)

17 August 2003
17:30

South Korea	2–3	Spain
Yang Dong-hyun 45'; Sánchez 59' (o.g.)	Report	Silva 65', 73', 76'

Lahti Stadium, Lahti
Attendance: 3,470
Referee: Marco Rodríguez (Mexico)

20 August 2003
17:30

Sierra Leone	2–3	South Korea
Metzger 36', 51'	Report	Han Dong-won 28'; Yang Dong-hyun 74'; Lee Yong-rae 78'

Lahti Stadium, Lahti
Attendance: 2,475
Referee: Leone Rakaroi (Fiji)

20 August 2003
20:00

United States	0–2	Spain
	Report	Jurado 11'; Fàbregas 70'

Lahti Stadium, Lahti
Attendance: 3,825
Referee: Heber Lopes (Brazil)

== Knockout stage ==
=== Bracket ===
Quarter-finals
23 August – Helsinki
Colombia	2
Costa Rica	0
24 August – Turku
Brazil	3
United States	0
23 August – Lahti
Argentina	2
Mexico	0
24 August – Tampere
Spain	5
Portugal	2

Semi-finals
27 August – Tampere
Colombia	0
Brazil	2
27 August – Helsinki
Argentina	2
Spain (a.e.t.)	3

Final
30 August – Helsinki
Brazil	1
Spain	0
Third place
30 August – Helsinki
Colombia	1 (4)
Argentina (p)	1 (5)

=== Quarter-finals ===
23 August 2003
14:00

Colombia	2–0	Costa Rica
Otalvaro 25', 43'	Report

Töölö Stadium, Helsinki
Attendance: 2,340
Referee: Eddy Maillet (Seychelles)

23 August 2003
18:00

Argentina	2–0	Mexico
Cardozo 34'; Peirone 45'	Report

Lahti Stadium, Lahti
Attendance: 5,030
Referee: Eric Braamhaar (Netherlands)

24 August 2003
14:00

Brazil	3–0	United States
Leonardo 18'; Ederson 61'; Evandro 64'	Report

Turku Stadium, Turku
Attendance: 6,150
Referee: Martin Hansson (Sweden)

24 August 2003
18:00

Spain	5–2	Portugal
Sánchez 28'; Fàbregas 42', 78'; Nadal 50'; Jurado 90+4' (pen.)	Report	Curto 3'; Vieirinha 87'

Ratina Stadium, Tampere
Attendance: 5,387
Referee: Gabriel Brazenas (Argentina)

=== Semi-finals ===
27 August 2003
17:00

Colombia	0–2	Brazil
	Report	Abuda 16', 72'

Ratina Stadium, Tampere
Attendance: 7,675
Referee: Marco Rodríguez (Mexico)

27 August 2003
20:00

Argentina	2–3 (a.e.t.)	Spain
Biglia 11'; Garay 31'	Report	Fàbregas 48', 119'; Jurado 53'

Töölö Stadium, Helsinki
Attendance: 5,030
Referee: Martin Hansson (Sweden)

=== Playoff for third place ===
30 August 2003
13:00

Colombia	1–1 (a.e.t.)	Argentina
Hidalgo 53' (pen.)	Report	Lagos 4'
Penalties
Hidalgo (penalty scored); Otalvaro (penalty scored); Guarín (penalty scored); Núñez (penalty missed); Movil (penalty scored); Vargas (penalty missed)	4–5	(penalty scored) Garay; (penalty scored) Formica; (penalty missed) Faurlín; (penalty scored) Cólzera; (penalty scored) Díaz; (penalty scored) Hassell

Töölö Stadium, Helsinki
Attendance: 6,400
Referee: Eddy Maillet (Seychelles)

=== Final ===
30 August 2003
16:00

Brazil	1–0	Spain
Leonardo 7'	Report

Töölö Stadium, Helsinki
Attendance: 10,452
Referee: Eric Braamhaar (Netherlands)

2003 FIFA Under-17 World champions

Brazil
Third title

== Goalscorers ==
There were 117 goals scored in 32 matches, for an average of 3.66 goals per match.

5 goals

- (Spain) Cesc Fàbregas
- (Colombia) Carlos Hidalgo
- (Portugal) Manuel Curto

4 goals

- (Brazil) Abuda
- (Brazil) Evandro
- (United States) Freddy Adu

3 goals

- (Argentina) Hernán Peirone
- (China) Jiang Chen
- (Colombia) Adrián Ramos
- (Spain) José Manuel Jurado
- (Spain) David Silva

2 goals

- (Argentina) Ezequiel Garay
- (Brazil) Ederson
- (Brazil) Leonardo
- (Cameroon) Joseph Mawaye
- (Cameroon) Serge N'Gal
- (China) Wang Yongpo
- (Colombia) Fredy Guarín
- (Colombia) Harrison Otalvaro
- (Finland) Tomi Petrescu
- (Nigeria) Ezekiel Bala
- (Portugal) Vieirinha
- (Sierra Leone) Samuel Barlay
- (Sierra Leone) Obi Metzger
- (South Korea) Yang Dong-Hyun
- (Spain) Xisco Nadal

1 goal

- (Argentina) Lucas Biglia
- (Argentina) Neri Cardozo
- (Argentina) Ariel Cólzera
- (Argentina) Alejandro Faurlín
- (Argentina) Diego Lagos
- (Australia) Dez Giraldi
- (Brazil) Arouca
- (Brazil) Léo Matos
- (Brazil) Thyago
- (Cameroon) Stéphane Mbia
- (Cameroon) Landry N'Guémo
- (Colombia) Sebastián Hernández
- (Colombia) Juan Gilberto Núñez
- (Costa Rica) Yosimar Arias
- (Costa Rica) Pablo Rodríguez
- (Costa Rica) Alonso Salazar
- (Finland) Jarno Parikka
- (Mexico) Julio Ceja
- (Mexico) Gerardo Flores Zúñiga
- (Mexico) Oscar Herrera
- (Mexico) Manuel Mariaca
- (Mexico) Rafael Murguía
- (Nigeria) Mikel John Obi
- (Portugal) Bruno Gama
- (Portugal) Manuel Fernandes
- (Portugal) Márcio Sousa
- (Sierra Leone) Alimamy Sesay
- (South Korea) Han Dong-won
- (South Korea) Lee Yong-rae
- (Spain) David Rodríguez
- (Spain) Sergio Sánchez
- (Spain) Sisi
- (United States) Steven Curfman
- (United States) Guillermo González
- (United States) Dwight Owens
- (United States) Jamie Watson
- (Yemen) Yasser Al-Badani
- (Yemen) Sami Juaim
- (Yemen) Abdulelah Sharyan

1 own goal

- (Portugal) Márcio Sousa (against Yemen)
- (Portugal) Tiago Costa (against Cameroon)
- (Spain) Ruz (against Sierra Leone)
- (Spain) Sergio Sánchez (against South Korea)
- (United States) Dwight Owens (against South Korea)
- (Yemen) Abdullah Al-Safi (against Portugal)

== Final ranking ==
Rank	Team	Pld	W	D	L	GF	GA	GD	Pts
1	Brazil	6	5	1	0	15	1	+14	16
2	Spain	6	4	1	1	16	10	+6	13
3	Argentina	6	4	1	1	10	4	+6	13
4	Colombia	6	3	2	1	14	5	+9	11
Eliminated in the quarter-finals
5	United States	4	2	0	2	8	7	+1	6
6	Mexico	4	1	2	1	5	5	0	5
7	Costa Rica	4	1	1	2	3	5	–2	4
8	Portugal	4	1	1	2	11	18	–7	4
Eliminated at the group stage
9	Nigeria	3	1	1	1	3	3	0	4
10	Cameroon	3	0	3	0	7	7	0	3
11	South Korea	3	1	0	2	6	11	–5	3
12	Finland	3	1	0	2	3	12	–9	3
13	Sierra Leone	3	0	1	2	6	8	–2	1
14	China	3	0	1	2	5	7	–2	1
15	Yemen	3	0	1	2	4	8	–4	1
16	Australia	3	0	0	3	1	6	–5	0
