= 2010–11 Al-Oruba F.C. season =

Al-Oruba
2010–11 season
- Chairman: (Yemen) Yahya Mohammed
- Manager: (Yemen)
- Yemeni League: 1st
Home colours	Away colours

The 2010–11 Al-Oruba F.C. season is the Al-Oruba Football Club of Yemen season from 2010–2011 season.

== Current first team squad ==
Note: Flags indicate national team as defined under FIFA eligibility rules; some limited exceptions apply. Players may hold more than one non-FIFA nationality.

No.	Pos.	Nation	Player
1	GK	YEM	Muaadh Abdulkhalek
2	DF	YEM	Hashem Al-Aedaroos
3	DF	YEM	Nashwan Aziz
4	MF	YEM	Abdulkareem Alweshah
5	MF	YEM	Ammar Baabood
6	MF	YEM	Ebraheem Ala''arasi
7	MF	YEM	Mohammed Almontasr
8	MF	YEM	Yaser Algabr
9	MF	YEM	Yaser Ali Hasan
10	MF	YEM	Yossef Alsayyady

No.	Pos.	Nation	Player
11	FW	YEM	Abdulelah Sharyan
12	FW	YEM	Ahmed Alzahry
13	FW	YEM	Ameen Al-Sabahi
14	FW	YEM	Gamal Althybani
15	FW	YEM	Shaban Mustafa
16	FW	ETH	Boul Afiunj
17	FW	ETH	Fabiano
18	FW	NGR	Ftai Adisa Alaw
19	FW	NGR	Tofani Adriso
20	MF	YEM	Abdo Al-Edresi (captain)

== Yemeni League ==
=== Matches ===
Win Draw Loss Postponed

=== Results ===
Kickoff times are in GMT.

28 October 2010	Al-Oruba	1 - 1	Al-Ahli San'a'
TBC UTC+08:45	AL-Dhaibani 87'		Al-Menj 72'

5 November 2010	Al-Sha'ab Hadramaut	3 - 3	Al-Oruba
TBC UTC+08:45

12 November 2010	Al-Oruba	3 - 0	Al-Saqr
TBC UTC+08:45		Summary

10 December 2010	Hassan Abyan	0 - 3	Al-Oruba
TBC UTC+08:45		Summary

16 December 2010	Al-Oruba	1 - 0	Al-Ittihad Ibb
TBC UTC+08:45		Summary

24 December 2010	Al Sha'ab Sana'a	0 - 2	Al-Oruba	Al Sha'ab San'a, San'a
TBC UTC+08:45		Summary	Duke 36' 86'

30 December 2010	Al-Oruba	3 - 0	Al Rasheed Ta'izz
TBC UTC+08:45		Summary

7 January 2011	Al-Shabab	0 - 0	Al-Oruba
TBC UTC+08:30		Summary

14 January 2011	Al-Oruba	2 - 2	Al-Tilal
TBC UTC+08:30		Summary

20 January 2011	Al-Wahda San'a'	2 - 3	Al-Oruba
TBC UTC+08:45		Summary

28 January 2011	Al-Oruba	1 - 0	Al-Hilal
TBC UTC+08:45		Summary

6 February 2011	Al-Sha'ab Ibb	2 - 1	Al-Oruba	22 May Stadium, Ibb
TBC UTC+08:30		Summary

11 February 2011	Al-Oruba	1 - 0	Al-Ahli Taizz
TBC UTC+08:45		Summary

6 March 2011	Al-Ahli San'a'	3 - 0	Al-Oruba
TBC UTC+09:00		Summary

12 March 2011	Al-Oruba	3 - 0	Al-Sha'ab Hadramaut
TBC UTC+09:00		Summary

20 March 2011	Al-Saqr	0 - 3	Al-Oruba
TBC UTC+09:00		Summary

3 April 2011	Al-Oruba	3 - 0	Hassan Abyan
TBC UTC+09:00		Summary

11 April 2011	Al-Ittihad Ibb	1 - 1	Al-Oruba
TBC UTC+09:00		Summary

15 May 2011	Al-Oruba	2 - 0	Al Sha'ab Sana'a
TBC UTC+09:00		Summary

29 May 2011	Al Rasheed Ta'izz	0 - 3	Al-Oruba
TBC UTC+09:00		Summary

7 July 2011	Al-Oruba	4 - 0	Al-Shabab
TBC UTC+09:00		Summary

10 July 2011	Al-Oruba	2 - 1	Al-Sha'ab Ibb
TBC UTC+09:00		Summary

13 July 2011	Al-Ahli Taizz	0 - 1	Al-Oruba	Ta'izz
TBC UTC+09:00		Summary

16 July 2011	Al-Hilal	1 - 2	Al-Oruba
TBC UTC+09:00		Summary

19 July 2011	Al-Oruba	2 - 1	Al-Wahda San'a'
TBC UTC+09:00		Summary

26 July 2011	Al-Tilal	1 - 4	Al-Oruba
TBC UTC+09:00		Summary

== See also ==
- 2011–12 season
