= Abdo Al-Edresi =

Yemeni footballer

Personal information
- Full name: Abdo Ali Al-Edresi
- Date of birth: 16 February 1986 (age 40)
- Place of birth: Yemen
- Height: 1.60 m (5 ft 3 in)
- Position: Midfielder

Youth career
- 1998–2001: Al Sha'ab Sana'a

Senior career*
Years	Team	Apps	(Gls)
2001–2005	Al Sha'ab Sana'a		
2005–2006	Al-Tilal		
2006–2007	Hassan Abyan		
2007–2010	Al-Ahli San'a'		
2010–2015	Al-Oruba		
2015–2016	Al-Watani		

International career^{‡}
2003	Yemen U17	13	(1)
2004	Yemen U20	7	(1)
2005	Yemen U23		
2004–	Yemen		
- * Club domestic league appearances and goals as of 00:00, 10 October 2011 (UTC) ‡ National team caps and goals as of 00:00, 20 September 2004(UTC)

Abdo Ali Al-Edresi (Arabic: عبده علي الادريسي; born 16 February 1986) is a Yemeni retired footballer. Al-Edresi played for Yemen at the 2003 FIFA U-17 World Championship in Finland.

== Honours ==
=== Club ===
Al-Oruba'

- Yemeni League: 1

2010–11

- Yemeni Super Cup: 1

2011

=== Country ===
- Yemen U17
  - FIFA U-17 World Cup
    - Group Stage: 2003
  - AFC U-17 Championship
    - Runner-up: 2002 AFC U-17 Championship
