= Manuel Curto =

Portuguese footballer (born 1986)

Personal information
- Full name: Manuel José da Luz Correia Curto
- Date of birth: 9 July 1986 (age 40)
- Place of birth: Torres Vedras, Portugal
- Height: 1.86 m (6 ft 1 in)
- Position: Midfielder

Youth career
- 1994–1998: Torreense
- 1998–2005: Benfica

Senior career*
Years	Team	Apps	(Gls)
2005–2006	Benfica B	20	(3)
2006	Cerro Reyes	8	(0)
2007	Torreense	10	(1)
2007	Pinhalnovense	6	(0)
2007–2008	Rio Maior	22	(6)
2008–2010	Estoril	36	(2)
2010–2011	Naval	18	(2)
2011–2012	União Leiria	20	(1)
2013	Taraz	13	(4)
2014	Zagłębie Lubin	12	(1)
2014–2015	Lierse	6	(0)
2016	Atlético	13	(2)
2017	Torreense	6	(0)
Total		190	(22)

International career
2002−2003	Portugal U17	15	(10)
2005	Portugal U19	4	(3)
2006	Portugal U20	1	(0)
Medal record
Men's football
Representing Portugal
UEFA European U17 Championship
Winner	2003 Portugal
- * Club domestic league appearances and goals

Manuel José da Luz Correia Curto (born 9 July 1986) is a Portuguese former professional footballer who played as a midfielder.

== Club career ==
Born in Torres Vedras, Lisbon District, Curto spent seven years in S.L. Benfica's youth system, where he operated as a forward. In the following years, however, he played in a more defensive position.

After several seasons in the lower leagues, Curto joined G.D. Estoril Praia in the Segunda Liga. In the 2010–11 campaign he made his Primeira Liga debut with Associação Naval 1º de Maio, his first match in the competition occurring on 24 September 2010 as he played nine minutes in a 3–1 away loss against S.C. Braga.

On 20 March 2011, Curto scored twice from the penalty kick spot to help hosts Naval come from behind 2–0 to earn a 2–2 draw with S.C. Beira-Mar, but the Figueira da Foz club eventually suffered relegation, returning to the second division after a six-year stay. He met the same fate in 2011–12 with his following team, U.D. Leiria.

== International career ==
Curto was part of the Portugal squad that won the 2003 UEFA European Under-17 Championship. He scored in group-stage wins over Denmark (3–2) and Austria (1–0), then featured 21 minutes for the hosts in the 2–1 final defeat of Spain.

In the FIFA U-17 World Cup held that same year in Finland, Curto scored a hat-trick in a 5–5 draw against Cameroon in the group phase. The tournament's top scorer alongside Cesc Fàbregas and Carlos Hidalgo at five, he also found the net in the quarter-finals, but Portugal lost 5–2 to Spain.

== Honours ==
Portugal U17

- UEFA European Under-17 Championship: 2003
