= Yemen national under-17 football team =

Yemen national under 17 football team

Yemen Under-17
- Nickname: Al-Yemen A'sa'eed
- Association: Yemen Football Association
- Confederation: AFC (Asia)
- Head coach: Samer Mohammed Fadhl Saleh
- Most caps: Abdo Al-Edresi (13)
- Home stadium: Althawra Sports City Stadium
- FIFA code: YEM
First colours	Second colours

First international
- North Yemen 16–0 Macau (Bangkok, Thailand; 21 August 1984)

AFC U-17 Asian Cup
- Appearances: 6 (first in 2002)
- Best result: Runners-up (2002)

Arab Cup U-17
- Appearances: 1 (first in 2012)
- Best result: Fourth place (2012)

FIFA U-17 World Cup
- Appearances: 1 (first in 2003)
- Best result: Group Stage (2003)

The Yemen national under-17 football team represents Yemen in international under-17 football competitions and is controlled by the Yemen Football Association.

== Tournament Records ==
=== FIFA U-17 World Cup ===
Year	Result	Pld	W	D	L	GF	GA
1985~1989	Part of the South Yemen						
(Italy) 1991	Did not enter						
1993~1997	Did not qualify						
(New Zealand) 1999	Withdrew						
(Trinidad and Tobago) 2001	Did not enter						
(Finland) 2003	Group Stage	3	0	1	2	4	8
(Peru) 2005	Did not qualify						
(South Korea) 2007	Did not qualify						
(Nigeria) 2009	Did not qualify						
(Mexico) 2011	Did not qualify						
(United Arab Emirates) 2013	Did not qualify						
(Chile) 2015	Did not qualify						
(India) 2017	Did not qualify						
(Brazil) 2019	Did not qualify						
(Peru) 2021	Did not qualify						
(Indonesia) 2023	Did not qualify						
(Qatar) 2025	Did not qualify						
(Qatar) 2026	Did not qualify						
Total:1/23	Group Stage	3	0	1	2	4	8

=== AFC U-17 Asian Cup ===
Year	Result	Pld	W	D	L	GF	GA
1985~1988	Country part of South Yemen						
(United Arab Emirates) 1990	Did not enter						
1992~1996	Did not qualify						
(Qatar) 1998	Withdrew						
(Vietnam) 2000	Did not enter						
(United Arab Emirates) 2002	Runners-up	6	4	2	0	10	5
(Japan) 2004	Did not qualify						
(Singapore) 2006	Group stage	3	0	1	2	4	6
(Uzbekistan) 2008^{1}	Group stage	2	0	0	2	0	6
(Uzbekistan) 2010	Did not qualify						
(Iran) 2012	Group stage	3	0	1	2	3	7
(Thailand) 2014	Did not qualify						
(India) 2016	Group stage	3	0	1	2	1	4
(Malaysia) 2018	Group stage	3	1	0	2	5	4
(Thailand) 2023	Quarter-finals	4	2	1	1	6	2
(Saudi Arabia) 2025	Group stage	3	1	0	2	3	5
(Saudi Arabia) 2026	Group stage	3	1	1	1	3	3
Total:9/17	Runners-up	30	9	7	14	35	42

^{1}Yemen were ejected from the 2008 AFC U-16 Championship competition for fielding an overage player, Wesam Saleh Al-Worafi.

=== Arab Cup U-17 ===
Year	Result	Pld	W	D	L	GF	GA
(Saudi Arabia) 2011	DNQ	–	–	–	–	–	–
(Tunisia) 2012	Fourth place	4	2	0	2	4	4
(Qatar) 2014	DNQ	–	–	–	–	–	–
(Algeria) 2022	Semi Finals	–	–	–	–	–	–
Total	Best: Fourth place	4	2	0	2	4	4

== Players ==
=== Current squad ===
The following 23 players were called up for the 2026 AFC U-17 Asian Cup qualification.

No.	Pos.	Player	Date of birth (age)	Club
1	GK	Wessam Al-Asbahi	3 June 2009 (aged 16)	(Yemen Football Association) Al-Ahli Sana'a
22	GK	Anas Al-Douh	15 March 2010 (aged 16)	(Yemen Football Association) Shula Aden
23	GK	Amr Wassim Al-Gariri		
3	DF	Sailan Sailan	9 February 2010 (aged 16)	(Yemen Football Association) Al-Shaab Sanaa
5	DF	Akram Abdulkareem Khaled	15 October 2009 (aged 16)	(Yemen Football Association) Al-Shaab Sanaa
10	DF	Ali Al-Wesabi		
12	DF	Ahmed Aljedy (captain)	30 October 2009 (aged 16)	(Yemen Football Association) Al-Wehda San'a
16	DF	Riyadh Mohammed Abdulwahab Abduljabbar		(Yemen Football Association) Al-Wehda Aden
19	DF	Mohsen Salem Taleb		(Yemen Football Association) Al-Wehda Aden
20	DF	Yousef Mohammed Fadhel	1 February 2010 (aged 16)	(Yemen Football Association) Al-Ahli Ta'izz
6	MF	Saber Al-Nuaimi		
9	MF	Mohammed Aziz		
14	MF	Al-Baraa Al-Madhloomi		
15	MF	Abdo Basheer		
2	FW	Adel Al-Hamomi		
4	FW	Ali Al-Maghdi		
7	FW	Fahd Al-Fakih		
8	FW	Al-Zubair Abdullah		
11	FW	Haitham Tawfik Al-Fakih		
13	FW	Ayman Mohammed Al-Obadi		(Yemen Football Association) Al-Ahli Sana'a
17	FW	Ahmed Hussein		
18	FW	Abdulrahman Al-Qufaili		
21	FW	Laith Esmail		

== Coaching staff ==
Position	Name	Notes
Manager	(Yemen)	
Assistant manager	(Yemen)	
Coach	(Yemen) Mohammed Al Badani	
Goalkeeping coach	(Yemen)	

== Golden generation ==
Year	Round	Score	Result
2003	Round 1	Yemen 3 – 4 Portugal	Lost
2003	Round 1	Yemen 1 – 1 Cameroon	Draw
2003	Round 1	Yemen 0– 3 Brazil	Lost

Golden generation (Elected hope) who participated in 2003 FIFA U-17 World Championship In Finland

No.	Pos.	Player	Date of birth (age)	Caps	Club
1	MF	Mohammed Alwah		0	(Yemen)
3	DF	Abdullah Al-Safi		0	(Yemen)
4	DF	Yasser Al-Baadani		0	(Yemen) Al Sha'ab Ibb
5	DF	Ali Al-Baiti		0	(Yemen)
6	FW	Sami Juaim		0	(Yemen)
7	MF	Fuad Al-Ammari		0	(Yemen)
8	MF	Khaled Baleid		0	(Yemen)
9	MF	Galal Al-Qatta		0	(Yemen)
10	MF	Akram Al-Selwi		0	(Yemen) Al-Hilal Al-Sahili
11	FW	Ebrahim Saleh		0	(Yemen)
12	DF	Hemyar Al-Mesri		0	(Yemen)
13	GK	Halim Al-Jabali		0	(Yemen)
14	DF	Wasim Al-Qor		0	(Yemen)
15	MF	Akram Al-Worafi		0	(Yemen)
16	FW	Abdulelah Sharyan		0	(Yemen)
17	DF	Esmat Al-Khtshi		0	(Yemen)
18	GK	Anwar Al-Aug		0	(Yemen) Al-Ittihad Ibb
19	DF	Mohanad Munassar		0	(Yemen)
20	MF	Abdo Al-Edresi (c)		3	(Yemen) Al Sha'ab San'a'

== Former squads ==
- 2003 FIFA U-17 World Championship squads

== Head-to-head record ==
The following table shows Yemen's head-to-head record in the FIFA U-17 World Cup and AFC U-17 Asian Cup.

=== In FIFA U-17 World Cup ===
Opponent	Pld	W	D	L	GF	GA	GD	Win %
Brazil	1	0	0	1	0	3	−3	0.00
Cameroon	1	0	1	0	1	1	+0	0.00
Portugal	1	0	0	1	3	4	−1	0.00
Total	3	0	1	2	4	8	−4	0.00

=== In AFC U-17 Asian Cup ===
Opponent	Pld	W	D	L	GF	GA	GD	Win %
Afghanistan	1	1	0	0	2	0	+2	100.00
China	1	1	0	0	1	0	+1	100.00
Indonesia	1	0	0	1	1	4	−3	0.00
Iran	3	0	1	2	1	5	−4	0.00
Iraq	1	0	1	0	1	1	+0	0.00
Japan	1	0	0	1	0	3	−3	0.00
Jordan	1	1	0	0	5	1	+4	100.00
Kuwait	1	0	1	0	1	1	+0	0.00
Laos	2	1	0	1	3	3	+0	50.00
Malaysia	2	1	0	1	4	3	+1	50.00
North Korea	2	0	0	2	0	3	−3	0.00
Oman	1	0	0	1	0	2	−2	0.00
Pakistan	1	1	0	0	2	1	+1	100.00
South Korea	3	0	2	1	3	4	−1	0.00
Syria	1	1	0	0	2	1	+1	100.00
Tajikistan	1	0	0	1	3	4	−1	0.00
Thailand	2	0	1	1	1	2	−1	0.00
Uzbekistan	1	0	0	1	0	1	−1	0.00
Vietnam	1	1	0	0	2	0	+2	100.00
Total	27	8	6	13	32	39	−7	29.63

== See also ==
- Yemen national football team
- Yemen national under-20 football team
- Yemen national under-23 football team
