= Time in China =

The time in China follows a single standard time offset of UTC+08:00, where Beijing is located, even though the country spans five geographical time zones. It is the largest sovereign nation in the world that officially observes only one time zone.

The nationwide standardized time is named Beijing Time (BJT; Chinese: 北京时间) domestically and China Standard Time (CST) internationally. Daylight saving time has not been observed since 1991.

China Standard Time (UTC+8) is consistent across Mainland China, Hong Kong, and Macau. It is also equivalent with Taiwan, central Indonesia, Philippines, Singapore, Brunei, most of Mongolia, Malaysia, Irkutsk Time of Russia, and Western Australia.

== History ==
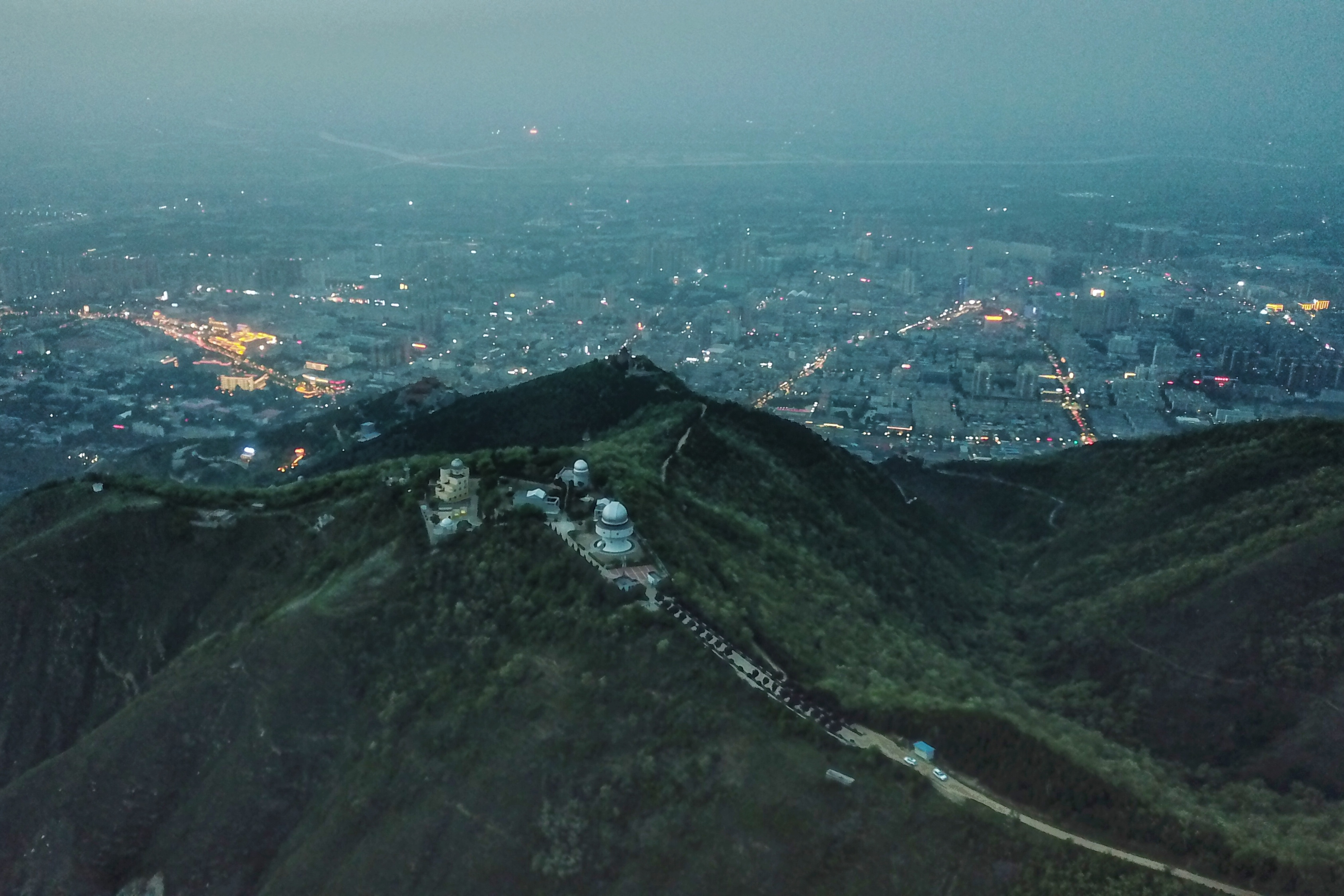
The National Time Service Center in Mount Li, Lintong, Xi'an, Shaanxi

In the 1870s, the Shanghai Xujiahui Observatory was constructed by a French Catholic missionary. In 1880s, officials in Shanghai French Concession started to provide a time announcement service using the Shanghai Mean Solar Time provided by the aforementioned observatory for ships into and out of Shanghai. By the end of 19th century, the time standard provided by the observatory had been switched to GMT+08:00. The practice has spread to other coastal ports, and in 1902, the "Coastal Time" was proposed to be the universal time zone for all the coastal ports in China. However, the time zone for the rest of China remained undetermined.

Until 1913, the official time standard for the whole of China was still the apparent solar time of Beijing, the capital of the country at the time. Starting in 1914, the Republic of China government began adopting the Beijing Local Mean Solar Time as the official time standard. By 1918, five standard time zones had been proposed by the Central Observatory of Beiyang government of Republic of China, including the Kunlun (UTC+05:30), Sinkiang-Tibet (UTC+06:00), Kansu-Szechwan (UTC+07:00), Chungyuan (UTC+08:00), and Changpai (UTC+08:30).

The 1947 version time zone assignment that was discontinued in 1949 after the People's Republic of China was founded: UTC+05:30 Kunlun Time UTC+06:00 Sinkiang-Tibet Time UTC+07:00 Kansu-Szechuan Time UTC+08:00 Chungyuan Time UTC+08:30 Changpai Time

After the defeat of Beiyang government in 1928, the mission of the Central Observatory was moved to Nanjing, and the reference time standard used for the construction of traditional Chinese calendar was shifted from Beijing Mean Solar Time to UTC+08:00.

In the 1930s, the proposed five time zones had not been fully observed, causing regions in inner China area to adopt their own time standards, resulting in chaos. On 9 March 1939, when the Ministry of the Interior organized a Standard Time Conference in Chongqing, it was decided to adopt the five time zone proposal with slight modification of their borders starting from 1 June, however it was also decided that the entire country would use the Kansu-Szechwan Time (UTC+07:00) during the Second Sino-Japanese War which had already begun at the time.

Following the end of World War II, the five time zone system was resumed, although there is little information about the historical usage of time in the Kunlun and Changpai zones. A further refined system with adjustment to zone assignment in the Northwest part of Gansu was announced in 1947 for adoption in 1948. However, as the Chinese Civil War came to its end in 1949–1950, regional governments under the influence of the Chinese Communist Party (CCP), other than those in Xinjiang and Tibet, switched to use the same time as Beijing, which is UTC+08:00, and is later known as Beijing Time or China Standard Time.

There are two independent sources that claim the CCP, and/or the People's Republic of China, were using apparent solar time for Beijing Time before the period between 27 September 1949 and 6 October 1949, and they adopted the time of UTC+08:00 within that period, but the claim is dubious.

Time zone changes in Tibet are undocumented, but Beijing Time was in use until at least the mid-1950s. Between 1969 and 1986, the time zone was switched repeatedly between Xinjiang Time (UTC+06:00) and Beijing Time.

Daylight saving time was observed from 1945 to 1948, and from 1986 to 1991.

In 1997 and 1999, Hong Kong and Macau were transferred to China from the United Kingdom and Portugal respectively, being established as special administrative regions. Although the sovereignty of the SARs belongs to China, they retain their own policies regarding time zones for historical reasons. Because of their geographical locations, both are within the UTC+08:00 time zone, which is the same as the national standard, Beijing time.

== Geography ==
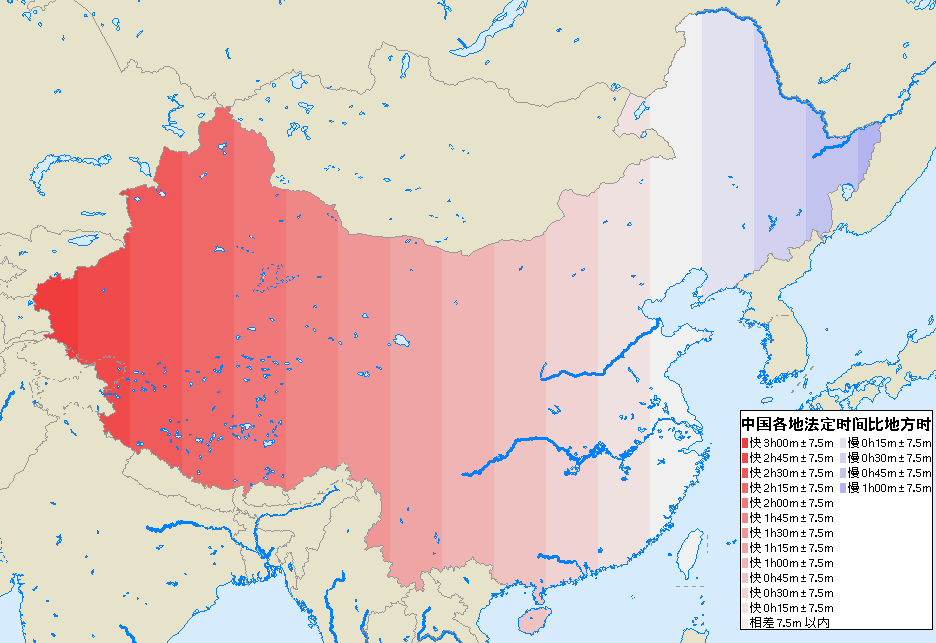
This map shows the difference between legal time and local mean time in China. Northeast China is significantly behind and western parts of China are significantly ahead of local solar time as a single standard time offset of UTC+08:00 is observed across the whole of China, even though the country spans almost five geographical time zones (73°26'E - 134°46'E).

As an illustration of the wide range, the daylight hours (Beijing Time) for the seats of the westernmost (both including and not including Xinjiang due to local customs, see below) and easternmost counties, calculated for the year 2010, are shown here:

Division			Daylight time	
Location	County	Province	1 January	1 July
Westernmost	Akto	Xinjiang	10:16 – 19:44	07:34 – 22:26
Westernmost (not including Xinjiang)	Zanda	Tibet	09:40 – 19:48	07:39 – 21:50
Easternmost	Fuyuan	Heilongjiang	06:54 – 15:18	03:05 – 19:08

The border with Afghanistan at the Wakhjir Pass has the most significant official change of clocks for any international land frontier: UTC+08:00 in China to UTC+04:30 in Afghanistan.

== Regions with special time regulations ==
=== Xinjiang ===
Map of Xinjiang, together with rest of China

In Xinjiang, two time standards are used in parallel, namely Beijing Time and Xinjiang Time.

Xinjiang Time, also known as Ürümqi Time (Chinese: 乌鲁木齐时间; pinyin: Wūlǔmùqí Shíjiān), is set due to its geographical location in the westernmost part of the country. The time offset is UTC+06:00, which is two hours behind Beijing, and is shared with neighbouring Kyrgyzstan.

Some local Xinjiang authorities now use both time standards side by side. Television stations schedule programmes in different time standards according to their nature.

The coexistence of two time zones within the same region causes some confusion among the local population, especially when inter-ethnic communication occurs. When a time is mentioned in conversation between Han and Uyghur, it is necessary to either explicitly make clear whether the time is in Xinjiang Time or Beijing Time, or convert the time according to the ethnicity of the other party. The double time standard is particularly observable in Xinjiang Television, which schedules its Chinese channel according to Beijing time and its Uyghur and Kazakh channels according to Xinjiang time.

Regardless, Beijing Time users in Xinjiang usually schedule their daily activities two hours later than those who live in eastern China. As such, stores and offices in Xinjiang are commonly open from 10:00 to 19:00 Beijing Time, which equals 08:00 to 17:00 in Ürümqi Time. This is known as the work/rest time in Xinjiang.

In most areas of Xinjiang, the opening time of local authorities is additionally modified by shifting the morning session 30–60 minutes earlier and the afternoon session 30 minutes later to extend the lunch break for 60–90 minutes, so as to avoid the intense heat during noon time in the area during summer.

=== Hong Kong and Macau ===
Hong Kong and Macau maintain their own time authorities after transfer of sovereignty in 1997 and 1999 respectively. The Hong Kong Time (Chinese: 香港時間; Jyutping: hoeng1 gong2 si4 gaan3) and Macau Standard Time (Chinese: 澳門標準時間; Jyutping: ou3 mun2 biu1 zeon2 si4 gaan3; Portuguese: Hora Oficial de Macau) are both UTC+08:00 all year round, thus in line with Beijing time, and daylight saving time has not been used since 1979 in Hong Kong and Macau. In Hong Kong, Greenwich Mean Time was adopted as the basis in 1904, and UTC was adopted as a standard in 1972. Before that, local time was determined by astronomical observations at Hong Kong Observatory using a 6-inch Lee Equatorial telescope and a transit circle.

== IANA time zone database ==
The territory of the People's Republic of China is covered in the IANA time zone database by the following zones. "Asia/Shanghai" is used instead of "Asia/Beijing" because Shanghai is the most populous city in the zone.

Columns marked with * are from the file zone.tab of the database.

c.c.*	coordinates*	TZ*	comments*	Standard time	Summer time	Notes
CN	+3114+12128	Asia/Shanghai	Beijing Time	+08:00	—N/a	
CN	+4348+08735	Asia/Urumqi	Xinjiang Time	+06:00	—N/a	Unofficial
HK	+2217+11409	Asia/Hong_Kong		+08:00	—N/a	
MO	+221150+1133230	Asia/Macau		+08:00	—N/a	

=== Backward compatibility zone ===
The following zones, including Asia/Kashgar, Asia/Chongqing, and Asia/Harbin, are kept in the "backzone" file of the IANA time zone database for backward compatibility.

c.c.*	coordinates*	TZ*	comments*	Standard time	Summer time	Notes
CN		Asia/Harbin		+08:00	—N/a	linked back to Asia/Shanghai
CN		Asia/Chongqing		+08:00	—N/a	linked back to Asia/Shanghai
CN		Asia/Kashgar		+06:00	—N/a	linked back to Asia/Urumqi

== See also ==
- Historical time zones of China
- Hong Kong Time
