= Anwar Al-Aug =

Yemeni footballer

Personal information
- Full name: Anwar Al-Aug
- Date of birth: 5 February 1986 (age 40)
- Place of birth: Yemen
- Height: 1.85 m (6 ft 1 in)
- Position: Goalkeeper

Team information
- Current team: Al-Ittihad Ibb
- Number: 1

Youth career
- 2000–2004: Al-Ittihad Ibb

Senior career*
| Years | Team | Apps | (Gls) |
| 2004– | Al-Ittihad Ibb | | |

International career
| 2002–2003 | Yemen U17 | | |
| 2004 | Yemen U20 | | |
| 2010– | Yemen | | |
- * Club domestic league appearances and goals

Anwar Al-Aug (Arabic: انور العوج; born 5 February 1986) is a Yemeni football goalkeeper who is currently playing for Al-Ittihad Ibb.

== Honours ==
=== Country ===
- Yemen U17
  - FIFA U-17 World Cup
    - Group Stage: 2003
  - AFC U-17 Championship
    - Runner-up: 2002 AFC U-17 Championship
