= Yasser Al-Baadani =

Yemeni footballer

Personal information
- Full name: Yasser Al-Baadani
- Date of birth: February 2, 1986 (age 40)
- Place of birth: Yemen
- Height: 1.72 m (5 ft 7 1/2 in)
- Position: Defender

Team information
- Current team: Al Sha'ab Ibb

Senior career*
Years	Team	Apps	(Gls)
2003–	Al Sha'ab Ibb	?	(?)
2009–2011	Al-Hilal Al-Sahili		
2011–	Al Sha'ab Ibb		

International career^{‡}
2003	Yemen U17	3	(1)
2004	Yemen U20	؟؟	(؟؟)
2004–	Yemen	؟؟	(؟؟)
- * Club domestic league appearances and goals as of 00:00, 10 October 2011 (UTC) ‡ National team caps and goals as of 00:00, 20 September 2004(UTC)

Yasser Al-Baadani (Arabic: ياسر البعداني; born February 2, 1986, in Yemen) is a Yemeni football defender currently playing for Al Sha'ab Ibb. He is a member of the Yemen national football team.

== Honours ==
=== Club ===
Al-Sha'ab Ibb'

- Yemeni League: 2

2002–03, 2003–04

- Yemeni President Cup: 2

2002, 2003

- Yemeni September 26 Cup: 1

2002

=== Country ===
- Yemen U17
  - FIFA U-17 World Cup
    - Group Stage: 2003
  - AFC U-17 Championship
    - Runner-up: 2002 AFC U-17 Championship

== International goals ==
Yasser Al-Baadani – goals for Yemen U-17
Goal	Date	Venue	Opponent	Score	Result	Competition
1	14 August 2003	Ratina Stadion, Finland	Portugal	1–0	3–4	2003 FIFA U-17 World Championship
