= Maluku =

Maluku may refer to:

== Places ==
- Maluku Islands, an archipelago that is part of Indonesia
  - List of the Maluku Islands
- Maluku (province), a province of Indonesia comprising the central and southern parts of the archipelago
- North Maluku, a province of Indonesia comprising the northern parts of the archipelago
- Republic of South Maluku, 1950s insurgency in central Maluku Province and its government in exile
- Maluku, Kinshasa, a commune in Kinshasa, Democratic Republic of the Congo

== Other uses ==
- Central Maluku languages, a group of fifty Austronesian languages
