= Historical time zones of China =

1918–49 time zones used in Republic of China

The time zones of China refer to the time zone divisions used in China between 1918 and 1949. The first time zone plan was proposed by the Central Observatory (now Beijing Ancient Observatory) of the Beiyang government in Peking (Beijing) in 1918. The proposal divided the country into five time zones: Kunlun (UTC+05:30), Sinkiang-Tibet (UTC+06:00), Kansu-Szechwan (UTC+07:00), Chungyuan (UTC+08:00) and Chinghai (UTC+08:30). These time zones were ratified in 1939 by the Nationalist government in the Standard Time Conference, hosted by the Ministry of Interior of Executive Yuan. Because of the Second Sino-Japanese War, it was also stated that Kansu-Szechwan time shall be the sole national time during the war time. After the war in 1945, these five times zones were implemented nationwide. In 1949, after the Chinese Civil War, the Central People's Government abolished the five time zones and announced it would use a single time zone UTC+08:00 named Beijing Time (北京时间). The term Chungyuan Standard Time (中原標準時間) was still used by the Government of the Republic of China on Taiwan until the early 2000s.

== Overview of the time zones ==
Times zones of China from 1918 to 1949 (incl. claimed territories)
Color					
Time offset	UTC+05:30	UTC+06:00	UTC+07:00	UTC+08:00	UTC+08:30
Name	Kunlun	Sinkiang-Tibet	Kansu-Szechwan	Chungyuan	Changpai
Chinese	崑崙時區	新藏時區	隴蜀時區	中原時區	長白時區
Pinyin	Kūnlún Shíqū	Xīn-Zàng Shíqū	Lǒng-Shǔ Shíqū	Zhōngyuán Shíqū	Chángbái Shíqū
Name origin	Kunlun Mountains	Sinkiang (Xinjiang) and Tibet	Kansu (Gansu) and Szechwan (Sichuan)	Central Plain	Changpai (Changbai) Mountains
Ref. longitude	82°30′E	90°E	105°E	120°E	127°30′E
Approx. present day tz database	CN Asia/Kashgar	CN Asia/Urumqi; MN Asia/Hovd	CN Asia/Chongqing; MN Asia/Ulaanbaatar	CN Asia/Shanghai; HK Asia/Hong_Kong; MN Asia/Choibalsan; MO Asia/Macau; TW Asia/Taipei	CN Asia/Harbin

== Time zones and administrative divisions ==
Time zone	Historical administrative divisions (as of 1945–49)	Present administrative divisions
Kunlun 崑崙時區 (UTC+05:30)	Western part of Sinkiang; Western part of Tibet Area	Western part of Tibet Autonomous Region; Western part of Xinjiang Uyghur Autonomous Region
Sinkiang-Tibet 新藏時區 (UTC+06:00)	Eastern part of Sinkiang; Eastern part of Tibet Area; Western part of Sikang; Western part of Tsinghai; Western part of Mongolia Area (until 1946)	Eastern part of Tibet Autonomous Region; Eastern part of Xinjiang Uyghur Autonomous Region; Western part of Qinghai; Western part of Mongolia; Tuva Republic of Russia
Kansu-Szechwan 隴蜀時區 (UTC+07:00)	Kansu; Kwangsi; Kweichow; Ningsia; Shensi; Suiyuan; Szechwan; Yunnan; Eastern part of Sikang; Eastern part of Tsinghai; Central part of Mongolia Area (until 1946)	Municipality of Chongqing; Gansu; Guizhou; Shaanxi; Sichuan; Yunnan; Guangxi Zhuang Autonomous Region; Ningxia Hui Autonomous Region; Western part of Inner Mongolia Autonomous Region; Eastern part of Qinghai; Central part of Mongolia
Chungyuan 中原時區 (UTC+08:00)	Anhwei; Chahar; Chekiang; Fukien; Honan; Hopeh; Hsingan; Hunan; Hupeh; Jehol; Kiangsi; Kiangsu; Kwangtung; Liaoning; Liaopeh; Shansi; Shantung; Taiwan (after 1945); Eastern part of the Mongolia Area (until 1946); Hainan Special Administrative Region (split from Kwangtung in 1949)	Municipality of Beijing; (Taiwan) Municipality of Kaohsiung; (Taiwan) Municipality of New Taipei; Municipality of Shanghai; (Taiwan) Municipality of Taichung; (Taiwan) Municipality of Tainan; (Taiwan) Municipality of Taipei; (Taiwan) Municipality of Taoyuan; Municipality of Tianjin; Anhui; PRC part of Fujian; (Taiwan) ROC part of Fujian (Kinmen and Matsu Islands); Guangdong; Hong Kong and Macau; Hainan; Hebei; Henan; Hubei; Hunan; Jiangsu; Jiangxi; Shandong; Shanxi; Taiwan (including Penghu); Zhejiang; Eastern part of Inner Mongolia Autonomous Region; Western part of Liaoning; Eastern part of Mongolia
Changpai 長白時區 (UTC+08:30)	Antung; Heilungkiang; Hokiang; Kirin; Nunkiang; Sungkiang	Heilongjiang; Jilin; Eastern part of Liaoning

== See also ==
- Time in China
- Time zones
