= Sami Juaim =

Yemeni footballer

Personal information
- Full name: Sami Juaim
- Date of birth: 3 May 1986 (age 40)
- Place of birth: Yemen
- Height: 1.70 m (5 ft 7 in)
- Position: Forward

Youth career
- 1998–2001: Al-Ahli Sana'a

Senior career*
Years	Team	Apps	(Gls)
2001–2009	Al-Ahli Sana'a		
2009–2011	Al Sha'ab Sana'a		

International career^{‡}
2003	Yemen U17	3	(1)
2004	Yemen U20		
2004	Yemen	3	
- * Club domestic league appearances and goals as of 00:00, 10 October 2011 (UTC) ‡ National team caps and goals as of 00:00, 20 September 2004(UTC)

Sami Juaim (Arabic: سامي جعيم) (born 3 May 1986) is a Yemeni football forward. He was a member of the Yemen national under-17 football team at the 2003 FIFA U-17 World Championship in Finland.

== Honours ==
=== Club ===
Al-Ahli San'a

- Yemeni League: 1

2006–07

=== Country ===
- Yemen U17
  - FIFA U-17 World Cup
    - Group Stage: 2003
  - AFC U-17 Championship
    - Runner-up: 2002 AFC U-17 Championship

== International goals ==
Sami Juaim – goals for Yemen U-17
Goal	Date	Venue	Opponent	Score	Result	Competition
1	17 August 2003	Ratina Stadion, Finland	Cameroon	1–1	1–1	2003 FIFA U-17 World Championship
