= Yaser Ali Al-Gabr =

Yemeni footballer

Yaser Ali Hasan Ali Al-Gabr
Personal information
- Full name: Yaser Al-Gabr
- Date of birth: 1 January 1993 (age 33)
- Place of birth: Yemen
- Position: Forward

Team information
- Current team: Al-Oruba
- Number: 10

Senior career*
Years	Team	Apps	(Gls)
2011–	Al-Oruba		

International career^{‡}
2015–	Yemen	4	(0)
- * Club domestic league appearances and goals as of 13:47, 1 October 2015 (UTC) ‡ National team caps and goals as of 13:47, 1 October 2015 (UTC)

Yaser Al-Gabr (born 1 January 1993) is a Yemeni footballer who plays for Al-Oruba.

== Honours ==
Al-Oruba

Winner

- Yemeni Super Cup: 2011
