= Macau Standard Time =

Zone time in Macau, UTC plus eight hours

Chinese name
- Traditional Chinese: 澳門標準時間
- Simplified Chinese: 澳门标准时间
Transcriptions
Standard Mandarin
- Hanyu Pinyin: Àomén Biāozhǔn Shíjiān
- Bopomofo: ㄠˋ ㄇㄣˊ ㄅㄧㄠ ㄓㄨㄣˇ ㄕˊ ㄐㄧㄢ
Yue: Cantonese
- Yale Romanization: Oumún Bīujéun Sìhgaan
- Jyutping: ou3 mun2 biu1 zeon2 si4 gaan1

Portuguese name
- Portuguese: Hora Oficial de Macau

Macau Standard Time (abbreviation: MST; Portuguese: Hora Oficial de Macau; Chinese: 澳門標準時間; Jyutping: ou3 mun2 biu1 zeon2 si4 gaan1) is the time zone in Macau. It is 8 hours ahead of UTC (UTC+8) all year, and daylight saving time has not been applied since 1980. The Meteorological and Geophysical Bureau is the official timekeeper of the Macau Standard Time. It is indicated as Asia/Macau in the IANA time zone database.

Macau Standard Time is currently in the same time zone as China Standard Time, also known as Beijing Standard Time or simply Beijing Time used in mainland China, and Hong Kong Time in Hong Kong.

== See also ==
- Time in Australia - Australian Western Standard Time is also UTC+08:00
- Time in China
- Time in Indonesia
- Time in Malaysia
- Time in Mongolia
- Time in Russia
- Time in Singapore
- Time in Taiwan
- Time in Vietnam § Saigon Standard Time
