= Cha Gi-suk =

South Korean footballer (1986–2021)

Personal information
- Date of birth: 26 December 1986
- Place of birth: Pohang, South Korea
- Date of death: 13 July 2021 (aged 34)
- Height: 1.91 m (6 ft 3 in)
- Position: Goalkeeper

Senior career*
Years	Team	Apps	(Gls)
2005–2008	Jeonnam Dragons	0	(0)
2009	Gyeongju Citizen		
2009–2010	Bucheon FC 1995		

International career
2002–2003	South Korea U17	17 (Note: Includes six appearances against clubs.)	(0)
2003–2005	South Korea U20	24 (Note: Includes one appearance against regional team.)	(0)
Medal record
Men's football
Representing South Korea
AFC Youth Championship
Winner	2004 Malaysia
AFC U-17 Championship
Winner	2002 United Arab Emirates
- * Club domestic league appearances and goals

Cha Gi-suk (26 December 1986 – 13 July 2021) was a South Korean footballer who played as a goalkeeper.

== Playing career ==
Cha was a member of South Korea national under-17 and under-20 teams. He was a champion and the Most Valuable Player at the 2002 AFC U-17 Championship, and participated in a summer training camp of PSV Eindhoven after the 2005 FIFA World Youth Championship.

However, Cha had chronic kidney disease since 2006, and so he could not play for his club Jeonnam Dragons. He received kidney transplants from his father in 2006 and his uncle after two years. After leaving Jeonnam, he played for Gyeongju Citizen in 2009 and Bucheon FC 1995 from 2009 to 2010 at the third division despite strong opposition from his parents.

== After retirement ==
Cha retired from playing in 2010, and worked as a goalkeeper coach at Yonsei University and youth team of Bucheon FC 1995. He had a kidney transplant from his another uncle due to the side effects of his second transplant in 2013. He suffered from Polymyositis since 2019 and thromboangiitis obliterans in 2020 due to a relapse of the side effects. He had both his legs amputated below his knees and put two stents in his heart. He died on 13 July 2021 at the age of 34.

== Honours ==
South Korea U17

- AFC U-17 Championship: 2002

South Korea U20

- AFC Youth Championship: 2004

Individual

- AFC U-17 Championship Most Valuable Player: 2002
