= Abdulelah Sharyan =

Yemeni footballer

Personal information
- Full name: Abdulelah Sharyan
- Date of birth: 11 January 1986 (age 40)
- Place of birth: Yemen
- Height: 1.80 m (5 ft 11 in)
- Position: Forward

Youth career
- Al-Saqr

Senior career*
| Years | Team | Apps | (Gls) |
| 2003–2005 | Al-Saqr | | |
| 2005–2006 | Al-Shula | | |
| 2006–2010 | May 22 San'a | | |
| 2010–2012 | Al-Oruba | | |
| 2013–2015 | Wehda Sana'a | | |

International career^{‡}
| 2003 | Yemen U17 | 3 | (1) |
| 2004 | Yemen U20 | ؟؟ | (؟؟) |
| 2004– | Yemen | 2 | (؟؟) |
- * Club domestic league appearances and goals as of 00:00, 10 October 2011 (UTC) ‡ National team caps and goals as of 00:00, 20 September 2004(UTC)

Abdulelah Sharyan (Arabic: عبدالاله شريان; born 11 January 1986) is a Yemeni football forward. He was a member of the Yemen national under-17 football team and played for Yemen at the 2003 FIFA U-17 World Championship in Finland.

== Honours ==
Al-Oruba'

- Yemeni League: 2010–11
- Yemeni Super Cup: 2011

Yemen U17

- AFC U-17 Championship runner-up: 2002 AFC U-17 Championship

== International goals ==
Abdulelah Sharyan – goals for Yemen U-17
| Goal | Date | Venue | Opponent | Score | Result | Competition |
|---|---|---|---|---|---|---|
| 1 | 14 August 2003 | Ratina Stadion, Finland | Portugal | 2–0 | 3–4 | 2003 FIFA U-17 World Championship |
