= Alimamy Sesay =

Sierra Leonean footballer (born 1987)

Personal information
- Full name: Alimamy Orkomie Sesay
- Date of birth: April 24, 1987 (age 39)
- Place of birth: Bo, Sierra Leone
- Height: 5 ft 6 in (1.68 m)
- Position: Attacking midfielder

Team information
- Current team: Kallon F.C.
- Number: 8

Senior career*
Years	Team	Apps	(Gls)
2001–2008	Kallon F.C.		
2009–2018	East End Lions		

International career
2003–	Sierra Leone	5	(0)
- * Club domestic league appearances and goals

Alimamy Sesay (born April 24, 1987), nicknamed Orkomie, is a Sierra Leonean footballer currently playing as a midfielder for East End Lions in the Sierra Leone National Premier League, the top football league in Sierra Leone.

== Biography ==
Sesay, commonly known by his nickname Orkomie was born and raised in Bo, the second largest city in Sierra Leone, to Temne parents. Between 2001 and 2003, Sesay was rated as one of the best teenage footballers in Sierra Leone. He joined top Sierra Leonean football club Kallon in 2001 at the age of 16. During his first season in the Sierra Leone National Premier League, he was named the best young player in the league under the age of 23 and among the best players overall. Sesay helped Kallon win their first Premier League championship in the 2006 season and also played for them in the 2006-2007 CAF Champions League.

== Playing career ==
- 2003–2008: Kallon F.C.
- 2009–2018: East End Lions

== International career ==
Sesay was a key player for the Sierra Leone under-17 team that took second place behind Cameroon at the 2003 African Under-17 Championship tournament held in Swaziland. He also played in all three games for Sierra Leone at the 2003 FIFA U-17 World Championship in Finland. He made his senior international debut for Sierra Leone on October 7, 2006, when the Leone Stars were defeated 2-0 in Benin in a 2008 African Nations Cup qualifier.
