= Julio Ceja (footballer) =

Mexican footballer (born 1986)

Personal information
- Full name: Julio César Ceja Ochoa
- Date of birth: 2 June 1986 (age 40)
- Place of birth: Zamora de Hidalgo, Michoacán, Mexico
- Height: 1.73 m (5 ft 8 in)
- Position: Midfielder

Youth career
- 2001–2007: Cruz Azul

Senior career*
Years	Team	Apps	(Gls)
2007–2013	Club León	68	(4)
2013	→ Estudiantes Tecos (loan)	16	(0)
2013–2014	→ Lobos de la BUAP (loan)	0	(0)

International career
2003	Mexico U17	4	(1)
2005	Mexico U20		
- * Club domestic league appearances and goals as of 22 June 2013

Julio César Ceja Ochoa (born 2 June 1986) is a Mexican former footballer, who last played as a right wing for Lobos de la BUAP on loan from Club León. He also played for Mexico U-17 in the 2003 FIFA U-17 World Championship and the 2005 CONCACAF U-20 Tournament.

== Club career ==
=== Cruz Azul ===
Julio Ceja began his career in the youth academies of Cruz Azul, where he stood out as a promising player. He was selected for the national team to be part the 2003 FIFA U-17 World Championship, to be played in Finland. He also initiated the process for the 2005 FIFA World Youth Championship that would be played in the Netherlands, but this time were eliminated in the 2005 CONCACAF U-20 Tournament.

During his time at Cruz Azul, he never was able to debut with the first team in the Liga MX. His departure from Cruz Azul came from what he describes as a decline in his career, in which he was unable to qualify with the Mexico national under-20 football team, in addition to a knee injury.

=== Club León ===
After his release from Cruz Azul he arrived at Club León in 2007. Recently operated on his knee injury, he would go without having any activity with the First Team for the first year, and only limited training.

Club León finally debuted Ceja on 25 February 2009 against Club Deportivo Tapatío. During that tournament, Clausura 2009, he would only play in 4 matches. In subsequent tournaments Julio Ceja would become a regular starter, until the end of the Torneo Apertura 2011, where his right knee injury returns, and he must have surgery, which marginalizes the whole activity next season, playing only 24 minutes in the final against Correcaminos UAT, reaching promotion with Club León to Liga MX.

== International career ==
Ceja participated with the Mexico U-17 team and Mexico U-17 team, playing the qualifying processes for the World Cups in both categories, qualifying only for the 2003 FIFA U-17 World Championship. In that tournament he played the 3 games of the group stage, the first against Colombia, the second against China and the third against hosts Finland in addition to scoring a goal in that game, and the quarter-final against Argentina being eliminated by a score of 2–0.

== Honours ==
=== Club ===
Club León

- Ascenso MX (1): Clausura 2012
- Campeon de Ascenso Ascenso MX: (1): Clausura 2012
