= Obi Metzger =

Sierra Leonean footballer

Personal information
- Full name: Sam Obi Metzger Jr.
- Date of birth: 19 September 1987 (age 39)
- Place of birth: Freetown, Sierra Leone
- Height: 1.73 m (5 ft 8 in)
- Positions: Attacking midfielder; second striker

Senior career*
Years	Team	Apps	(Gls)
2003	Ports Authority	6	(4)
2004	Mighty Blackpool	0	(0)
2004	Racing Beirut	21	(14)
2005–2008	Atlantis	45	(12)
2009	PP-70	22	(8)
2009–2010	MFK Topvar Topoľčany	11	(5)
2010	Viikingit	8	(6)
2011–2012	FC Haka	46	(8)
2013	Viikingit	21	(5)
2014	FC Haka	18	(2)
2015–2021	Atlantis		

International career
2003	Sierra Leone U17	3	(2)
2008–2012	Sierra Leone	4	(0)
- * Club domestic league appearances and goals

Sam Obi Metzger, Jr. (born 19 September 1987 ) is a Sierra Leonean former professional footballer who played as an attacking midfielder or second striker.

== Career ==
Metzger played at the 2003 FIFA U-17 World Championship in Finland. Sierra Leone lost two of the three games at the tournament, including a 2–1 loss to the United States team. Metzger played in all three games and was again the top scorer for Sierra Leone with two goals. Metzger made his senior international debut for Sierra Leone on 6 September 2008, as a substitute replacing Mustapha Bangura in a 2010 FIFA World Cup and 2008 African Nations Cup qualifier as Sierra Leone defeated Guinea Bissau 2–0 in Freetown.

He also played second division in Slovakia for MFK Topvar Topoľčany which he joined for the second half of the 2009 season.

On 1 February 2011, he joined Veikkausliiga side FC Haka on a two-year deal.

== Personal life ==
Metzger was born in Freetown to Krio parents. He is the son of Obi Metzger, Sr., who is a former Sierra Leonean international footballer and former coach of the Sierra Leone national football team.
