= UTC+08:30 =

Former time zone

- Time zone

UTC offset
- UTC: UTC+08:30

Current time
- :: UTC+08:30 [refresh]

Central meridian
- 127.5 degrees E

Date-time group
- H*

UTC+08:30 is an identifier for a time offset from UTC of +08:30. It was formerly used in China (as Changpai Time Zone), Indonesia, and both Koreas.

== History ==
This time zone became the Local Mean Time in Davao Oriental and in easternmost areas of the Philippines from Wednesday, January 1, 1845, until May 10, 1899 (Gregorian calendar), mandated by the virtue of Claveria's decree to reform the country calendar by skipping Tuesday, December 31, 1844, that redrew the International Date Line from being west of the country to go east and made the Philippines have same dates with the rest of Asia, as trade interests with Imperial China, the Dutch East Indies, and neighboring countries increased after the Spanish American Wars of Independence. The Philippines was an entire day behind its neighboring Asian territories for 323 years, 9 months, and 4 days since Magellan's sighting in Samar on Saturday, March 16, 1521 (Julian Calendar), which was caused by the tricky and unmentioned international date line during the 16th century.

UTC+08:30 was once used in the Maluku region of Indonesia (currently divided into the provinces of North Maluku and Maluku) first from 1932 to 1942 and then from 1950 to 1963; the region has ever since utilised UTC+09:00.

UTC+08:30 was also the standard time of South Korea from 1954 to 1961 and North Korea from 2015 to 2018.

Between 1918 and 1949, UTC+08:30 was also used for Changpai Time Zone in northeast China

== See also ==
- Time in China
- Time in Indonesia
- Time in North Korea
- Time in South Korea
