= Carlos Hidalgo (footballer, born 1986) =

Colombian footballer

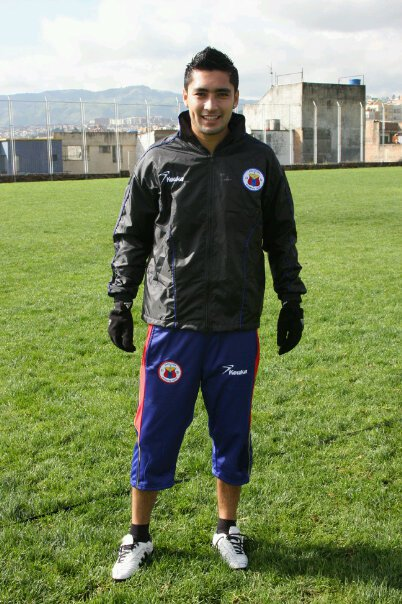

Personal information
- Full name: Carlos Daniel Hidalgo Cadena
- Date of birth: January 22, 1986 (age 40)
- Place of birth: Pasto, Colombia
- Height: 1.81 m (5 ft 11 in)
- Position: Striker

Youth career
- Deportivo Pasto

Senior career*
Years	Team	Apps	(Gls)
2002–2009	Deportivo Pasto	92	(31)
2005	→ Deportes Quindío (loan)	29	(6)
2006	→ Independiente Santa Fe (loan)	14	(0)
2007–2008	→ Sporting de Gijón (loan)	7	(1)
2008–2009	→ Independiente Medellín (loan)	20	(4)
2010	Independiente Santa Fe	8	(0)
2010–2012	Deportivo Pasto	34	(13)
2012	Club Guaraní	23	(4)
2013	Atlético Bucaramanga	22	(6)
2013–2014	Lobos BUAP	4	(0)
2014–2016	Real Potosí	27	(4)
2016–2017	Sonsonate	9	(2)
2019–2023	Deportivo Pasto	33	(4)

International career
2003	Colombia U-17	6	(5)
- * Club domestic league appearances and goals

Carlos Daniel Hidalgo Cadena (born January 25, 1986) is a retired Colombian professional footballer who played as a striker.

He played on the Colombian U-17 team in the 2003 FIFA U-17 World Championship and ended up being one of the golden boot award winners by scoring 5 goals.
