= Guillermo Gonzalez (soccer) =

American soccer player (born 1986)

Personal information
- Full name: Guillermo Gonzalez
- Date of birth: January 4, 1986 (age 40)
- Place of birth: Paramount, California, United States
- Height: 5 ft 11 in (1.80 m)
- Position: Midfielder

Youth career
- 2000–2002: Irvine Strikers
- 2002–2003: IMG Academy

Senior career*
Years	Team	Apps	(Gls)
2003–2006	Los Angeles Galaxy	12	(0)

International career^{‡}
2003	United States U-17	3	(0)
- * Club domestic league appearances and goals as of 9 April 2009 ‡ National team caps and goals as of 2 April 2010

Guillermo "Memo" Gonzalez (born January 4, 1986, in Paramount, California) is an American soccer player, currently without a team.

== Career ==
=== Professional ===
Gonzalez was member of the IMG Academy in Bradenton, Florida in 2003 (the same class as Eddie Gaven and Freddy Adu), and became one of the youngest players in MLS history when Los Angeles Galaxy drafted him as a Project-40 player with the eighth overall pick of the 2003 MLS SuperDraft at the age of 16.

Guillermo spent most of his first year in the professional ranks playing with the United States U-17 national team, and played at the Under-17 World Championship in Finland.

In his four years in Major League Soccer, Gonzalez did not see much playing time due to his youth team commitments, a cluttered Galaxy midfield, and his own lackluster performances in his limited appearances. During his first two seasons in MLS he played 12 games, but played none at all during his third and fourth seasons. He was waived by the Galaxy during the 2007 pre-season.

=== Coaching ===
Since his release from the Galaxy, Gonzalez has been unable to catch on with another team, and has begun working as a youth coach. He worked for a period at Immaculate Heart High School in Los Feliz, California. He is also a head varsity coach at Bishop Amat Memorial High School in La Puente, California.
