= Yemeni football clubs in Asian competitions =

The Yemen club's history of playing in the AFC Champions League Two.

== Participations ==
Table shows teams from Yemen that have qualified to participate in the Cup. Table ends in the year 2015, the last time a team from Yemen participated in the AFC Champions League Two. In 2016, they earned a qualifier spot, but no team was submitted. Subsequently, Yemen has not joined the licensing system of the AFC and has not been eligible for participation.

Participations													
Team	Qualified	2004	2005	2006	2007	2008	2009	2010	2011	2012	2013	2014	2015
(Yemen) Al-Ahli Sana'a|	2 Times	—	—	—	—	Group Stage	—	Group Stage	—	—	—	—	—
(Yemen) Al-Hilal	3 Times	—	—	—	Group Stage	—	Group Stage	Group Stage	—	—	—	—	—
(Yemen) Al-Saqr	2 Times	—	—	—	Group Stage	—	—	—	Group Stage	—	—	—	Qualifiers
(Yemen) Shaab Ibb	2 Times	Group Stage	—	—	—	—	—	—	—	—	Group Stage	—	—
(Yemen) Al Yarmuk	0 Times	—	—	—	—	—	—	—	—	—	—	Qualifiers	—
(Yemen) Al-Ahli Taizz	1 Time	—	—	—	—	—	—	—	—	—	Group Stage	—	—
(Yemen) Al-Wehda	0 Times	Withdrew	—	—	—	—	—	—	—	—	—	—	—
(Yemen) Al-Sha'ab Hadramaut	1 Time	—	—	—	—	Group Stage	—	—	—	—	—	—	—
(Yemen) Al-Tilal	3 Times	—	—	—	—	—	Group Stage	—	Group Stage	Group Stage	—	—	—
(Yemen) Al-Oruba	1 Time	—	—	—	—	—	—	—	—	Group Stage	—	—	—

== See also ==
- AFC Cup
