= Abuda (footballer, born 1986) =

Brazilian footballer

Personal information
- Full name: Adaílson Pereira Coelho
- Date of birth: 28 March 1986 (age 40)
- Place of birth: São Luís, Brazil
- Height: 1.75 m (5 ft 9 in)
- Position: Forward

Youth career
- 2000–2003: Corinthians

Senior career*
| Years | Team | Apps | (Gls) |
| 2003–2005 | Corinthians | 14 | (5) |
| 2004 | → Náutico (loan) | | |
| 2005–2006 | VfL Wolfsburg | 1 | (0) |
| 2006–2007 | Germinal Beerschot | 2 | (0) |
| 2007–2008 | Vasco da Gama | 19 | (2) |
| 2008–2010 | Avaí | 5 | (2) |
| 2009 | → Paraná (loan) | 3 | (0) |
| 2009 | → Marília (loan) | 11 | (7) |
| 2009 | → Brasiliense (loan) | 14 | (4) |
| 2010 | Tours | 0 | (0) |
| 2010–2011 | Dibba Al-Hisn | 1 | (0) |
| 2011 | Sampaio Corrêa | 1 | (0) |
| 2011 | Moto Club | 6 | (0) |
| 2012 | Oeste | 3 | (0) |
| 2012 | FC Gifu | 12 | (1) |
| 2013 | Icasa | 5 | (1) |
| 2013 | Roma | 0 | (0) |
| 2014 | Operário | 10 | (0) |
| 2014 | Tokyo Verdy | 2 | (0) |

International career
| 2003 | Brazil U-17 | | |
- * Club domestic league appearances and goals

Adaílson Pereira Coelho, more commonly known as Abuda (born 28 March 1986 in São Luís), is a Brazilian striker.

In January 2009, he was loaned to Paraná, in February 2009 to Marília and in May of the same year to Brasiliense.

== Honours ==
- World Cup (U 17): 2003
- São Paulo's Cup (U 20): 2004
