= Harrison Otálvaro =

Colombian footballer (born 1986)

Personal information
- Full name: José Hárrison Otálvaro Arce
- Date of birth: 28 February 1986 (age 40)
- Place of birth: Cali, Colombia
- Height: 1.78 m (5 ft 10 in)
- Position: Attacking midfielder

Senior career*
Years	Team	Apps	(Gls)
2004–2009	América de Cali	14	(2)
2006	→ Dynamo Kyiv (loan)	0	(0)
2009–2010	Cúcuta Deportivo	16	(1)
2010–2011	Huracán	4	(0)
2011	León de Huánuco	24	(0)
2011–2014	Millonarios	117	(9)
2014–2015	Atlético Nacional	18	(0)
2014–2015	Millonarios	4	(1)
2016	Deportes Tolima	11	(2)
2016–2017	Al Shamal	3	(1)
2019	Real Cartagena	16	(0)
2020–	Atlético Huila	17	(2)

International career
2003	Colombia U-17	3	(1)
2003–2005	Colombia U-20	5	(1)
- * Club domestic league appearances and goals as of 26 December 2020

José Hárrison Otálvaro Arce (born 28 February 1986) is a Colombian football player who plays as an attacking midfielder.

== Club career ==
Otálvaro joined the Argentine side Huracán for the 2010–11 Argentine Primera División season.

As a member of Colombia's Youth Team, he won the South American Youth Championship in 2005 and played the 2005 FIFA World Youth Championship. His team reached the round of 16, with Harrison scoring 1 goal.

== Honours ==
América de Cali

- Categoría Primera A (1): 2008-II

Millonarios Fútbol Club

- Categoría Primera A (1): 2012-II
