= Juan Gilberto Núñez =

Colombian footballer (born 1986)

Personal information
- Full name: Juan Gilberto Núñez Castillo
- Date of birth: March 25, 1986 (age 40)
- Place of birth: Cali, Colombia
- Height: 1.85 m (6 ft 1 in)
- Position: Forward

Team information
- Current team: Deportivo Pereira

Senior career*
Years	Team	Apps	(Gls)
2001–2007	Deportes Quindío	0	(0)
2008	Atletico Huila	29	(4)
2009–10	Boyacá Chicó	62	(8)
2011	La Equidad	34	(5)
2012	Atlético Junior	13	(2)
2013	América de Cali	20	(5)
2014	Fortaleza	21	(4)
2015	Altamira	12	(1)
2015	Harbin Yiteng	10	(4)
2016	Sport Huancayo	11	(0)
2016–2017	Deportivo Pasto	31	(1)
2018–	Deportivo Pereira	5	(0)

International career
2003	Colombia U17	0	(0)
- * Club domestic league appearances and goals as of 17 May 2018

Juan Gilberto Núñez Castillo (Latin American Spanish: [xwaŋxilˈβeɾto ˈnuɲes]; (Note: In isolation, Juan and Gilberto are pronounced [xwan] and [xilˈβeɾto] respectively.) born 26 March 1986) is a Colombian footballer who plays for Deportivo Pereira in the Categoría Primera B. He can play as a midfielder or striker.

== Club career ==
On 14 July 2015, he completed a move to China with Harbin Yiteng F.C.

== International career ==
Núñez played with the Colombia national under-17 football team at the 2003 South American Youth Championship, which Colombia hosted made it to the semi-final.
