= Ezekiel Bala =

Nigerian football striker

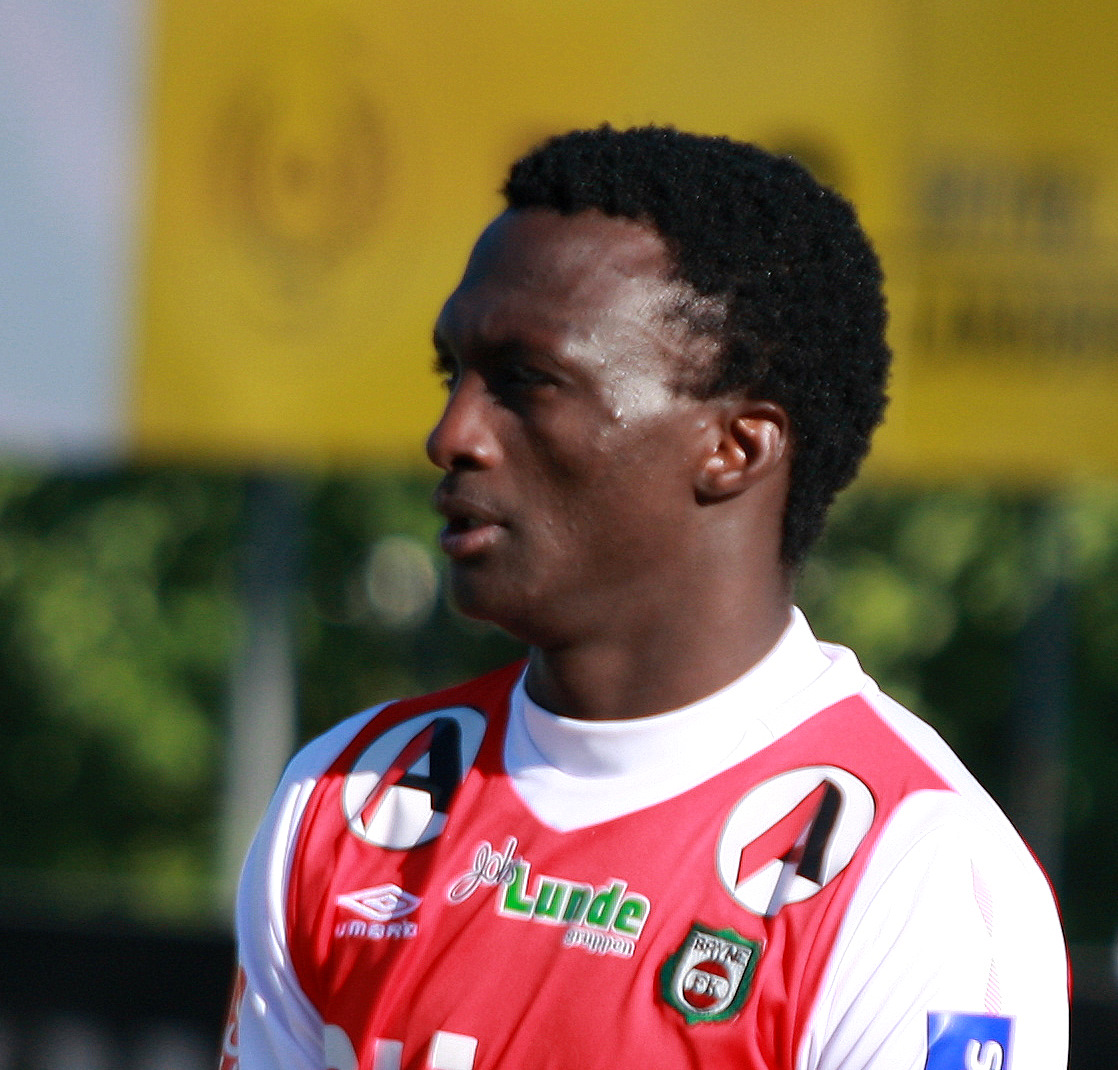

Personal information
- Full name: Ezekiel Bala
- Date of birth: 8 April 1987 (age 39)
- Place of birth: Jos, Nigeria
- Height: 1.70 m (5 ft 7 in)
- Position: Striker

Youth career
- J.C. Raiders
- 2004–2005: Lyn

Senior career*
Years	Team	Apps	(Gls)
2005–2007	Lyn	18	(2)
2008–2010	Bryne	74	(13)
2011	Randaberg	23	(6)
2012–2013	Nybergsund	10	(1)
2014	Funnefoss/Vormsund		
2015–2018	Ålgård		
2018–2021	Rosseland		

International career
2007	Nigeria U20		
- * Club domestic league appearances and goals as of 19:43, 16 January 2023 (UTC)

Ezekiel Bala (born 8 April 1987) is a Nigerian former professional footballer who played as a striker.

== Career ==
He made his debut for Lyn in a cup match against Klemetsrud IL, on 11 May 2005, and scored 2 goals in a total of 23 league games for the club. His previous club was J.C Raiders in Jos, Nigeria.

He joined Bryne in 2008 from Lyn, later Randaberg, Nybergsund, Funnefoss/Vormsund and Ålgård.

== International career ==
Bala was the captain of Nigeria's team in the 2007 FIFA U-20 World Cup in Canada, where he scored both goals in the win over Scotland.
