= Joseph Desire Mawaye =

Cameroonian footballer

Joseph Mawaye
Personal information
- Full name: Joseph Desire Mawaye
- Date of birth: 14 May 1986 (age 40)
- Place of birth: Douala, Cameroon
- Height: 1.84 m (6 ft 0 in)
- Position: Forward

Senior career*
Years	Team	Apps	(Gls)
2003	Dreams FC		
2004–2006	Kadji Sports Academy		
2006	→ Anderlecht (loan)		
2008–2009	Kasımpaşa	30	(6)
2010–2011	Arka Gdynia	26	(0)
2012–2013	Roye-Noyon	19	(8)
2013–2014	Trélissac	13	(2)
2014	Kallithea	6	(1)
2015	Louhans-Cuiseaux	11	(1)

International career
2003	Cameroon U17	3	(2)
- * Club domestic league appearances and goals

Joseph Desire Mawaye (born 14 May 1986) is a Cameroonian former professional footballer who played as a forward.

== Career ==
His previous club was Kasımpaşa in the Süper Lig, where he played as Desire Yosuef.

He was released from Arka Gdynia on 30 June 2011.
