= Diego Lagos =

Argentine footballer

Personal information
- Full name: Diego Eduardo Lagos
- Date of birth: March 5, 1986 (age 40)
- Place of birth: Mar del Plata, Argentina
- Height: 1.76 m (5 ft 9 in)
- Position: Midfielder

Team information
- Current team: Colón
- Number: 7

Youth career
- Lanús

Senior career*
Years	Team	Apps	(Gls)
2003–2011	Lanús	81	(13)
2011–2012	Instituto	36	(9)
2012–2014	Rosario Central	55	(7)
2014–	UNAM	20	(1)
2015–2016	→ Aldosivi (loan)	21	(1)
2016–	Colón	7	(0)

International career
2003	Argentina U-17	11	(4)
- * Club domestic league appearances and goals as of 30 December 2015

Diego Lagos (born 5 March 1986 in Mar del Plata) is an Argentine football midfielder. He currently plays for Colón in the Argentine Primera División.

== Titles ==
Season	Team	Title
Apertura 2007	Lanús	Primera División Argentina
