= List of the Maluku Islands =

The Maluku Islands (formerly the Moluccas) are a group of islands within Indonesia. The region is administered under two provinces: Maluku and North Maluku.

== Major islands in the province of North Maluku ==
- Halmahera
- Ternate
- Tidore
- Morotai
- Makian
- Moti Island
- Bacan
- Mandioli
- Kasiruta
- Gebe

== In the Banda Sea ==
=== Major islands, or island groups, in Maluku Province ===
- Ambon
- Buru
- Seram
- Haruku
- Saparua
- Gorong Islands
- Watubela Islands
- Kai Islands
- Aru Islands
- Tanimbar
- Babar
- Leti
- Wetar
- Banda Islands
