= Yemen Football Association =

Football association in Yemen

Yemen Football Association الاتحاد اليمني لكرة القدم
AFC
- Short name: YFA
- Founded: 1962/1976
- Headquarters: Sanaa
- FIFA affiliation: 1980
- AFC affiliation: 1980
- UAFA affiliation: 1978
- WAFF affiliation: 2009
- GFF affiliation: 2016
- President: Ahmed Saleh Al-Eissi
- Vice-President: Hasan Bashanfar
- General Secretary: Hamid Al-Shaibani
- Website: http://www.yemenfa.co

The Yemen Football Association (Arabic: الاتحاد اليمني لكرة القدم) is the governing body of football in Yemen. The organisation joined FIFA in 1980 as the Yemen Arab Republic, and was later united with People's Republic of South Yemen in 1990.

In 2005 the YFA was suspended by FIFA due to serious interference by political authorities in the internal affairs of the association, violating Article 17 of the FIFA Statutes.

== Former Presidents ==
- Ali Al Ashwal 1987–2000
- Mohammed Abdel-ilah Al Qadhi 2000–2006
- Ahmed Saleh Al-Eissi 2006–present

=== Association staff ===
Name	Position	Source
(Yemen) Ahmed Saleh Al-Eissi	President	
(Yemen) Hasan Bashanfar	Vice President	
(Yemen) Abdulmoniam Sharhan	2nd Vice President	
(Yemen) Hamid Al Shaibani	General Secretary	
(Yemen) Mohamed Al-Tawel	Treasurer	
n/a	Technical Director	
(Yemen) Ahmed Al Dhrab	Team Coach (Men's)	
n/a	Team Coach (Women's)	
(Yemen) Moad Al-Khamese	Media/Communications Manager	
(Yemen) Labeb Al Mehde	Futsal Coordinator	
(Yemen) Gamal Al-Khwarabi	Referee Coordinator	

== See also ==
- Yemen football clubs in the AFC Cup
