= Alao Fatai Adisa =

Nigerian footballer (born 1986)

Alao Fatai
Personal information
- Full name: Alao Fatai Adisa
- Date of birth: 30 November 1986 (age 39)
- Place of birth: Kwara, Nigeria
- Position: Defender

Youth career
- Kwara United F.C.

Senior career*
Years	Team	Apps	(Gls)
2008	Al-Ittihad		
2009–2014	Al-Oruba		
2014	Mohun Bagan		
- * Club domestic league appearances and goals

Alao Fatai Adisa(born 30 November 1986 in Kwara) is a Nigerian professional footballer.

== Career ==
=== Al-Oruba ===
Adisa joined Oruba in 2009 from Al-Ittihad (Ibb). He played in 2012 for the club Al-Oruba in the 2012 AFC Cup.

=== Mohun Bagan ===
On 26 June 2014 it was announced that Fatai had signed for Indian club, Mohun Bagan, of the I-League. However, on 5 November 2014, he was released by mutual agreement for failing to "adjust to the Indian conditions and style of play".

However, on 5 November, before the season began Adisa was released from Mohun Bagan.

== Career statistics ==
=== Club ===
Statistics accurate as of 14 May 2012

Club	Season	League			Cup			AFC			Total		
Club	Season	Apps	Goals	Assists	Apps	Goals	Assists	Apps	Goals	Assists	Apps	Goals	Assists
Al-Oruba	2011–12	16	1	0	1	1	0	6	2	0	23	4	0
Career total		16	1	0	1	1	0	6	2	0	23	4	0
