= Time in Mongolia =

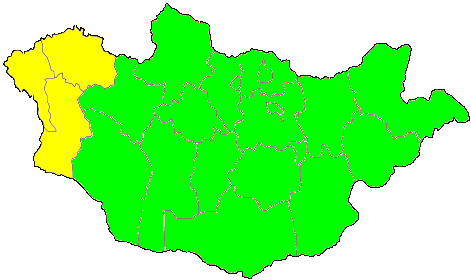
Time in Mongolia Western Mongolia Time (UTC+7) Eastern Mongolia Time (UTC+8)

Time in Mongolia is officially represented by the Mongolian Standard Time (UTC+08:00). However, the far western provinces of Khovd, Uvs and Bayan-Ölgii use UTC+07:00. (Note: While international references or world factbooks have occasionally simplified Mongolia's status by listing a single dominant time zone, domestic laws and regional clocks have consistently maintained at least a two-zone split between the East/Central territories and the West.)

== Daylight saving time ==
Mongolia used daylight saving time in 1983–1998, 2001–2006 and 2015–2016. However, Mongolia observes time almost exactly an hour ahead of its geographical time zone, with its border between UTC+7 and UTC+8 being almost exactly the longitudinal line of 97.5° E (which is really the designated border for between UTC+7 and UTC+6), so all of Mongolia could be said to be on permanent daylight/summer time.

== IANA time zone database ==
The IANA time zone database contains two zones for Mongolia in the file zone.tab.

c.c.	coordinates	TZ	comments	Standard time	Summer time	Notes
MN	+4755+10653	Asia/Ulaanbaatar	most of Mongolia	+08:00	+08:00	Link from Asia/Choibalsan, Asia/Ulan_Bator
MN	+4801+09139	Asia/Hovd	Bayan-Ölgii, Hovd, Uvs	+07:00	+07:00	Bayan-Ölgii, Hovd, Uvs

== See also ==
- Historical time zones of China
