= Yemeni Super Cup =

- Founded: 2007
- Abolished: 2014
- Region: Yemen
- Teams: 2
- Last champions: Al-Ahli San'a' (4th title)
- Most championships: Al-Ahli San'a' (4 titles)

The Yemeni Super Cup is a Yemeni association football trophy contested in an annual match between the champions of the Yemeni League and the Yemeni Cup.

== List of finals ==
=== By year ===
Year	Champions	Goals	Score	Goals	Runners-up
2007	Al-Ahli San'a'	Yehia Hobn 54'	1–1 (5–3 pen.)	Ramzi Mohammad 86'	Al-Tilal
2008	Al-Ahli San'a'		2–2 (4–2 pen.)		Al-Hilal
2009	Al-Ahli San'a'	AL-Khaiat 34'; Al-Ghemasa 89'; El Naqeeb 90'	3–0		Al-Hilal
2010	Al-Saqr	Yordanos 45'; Mohammed Faisal 62'	2–1	Almi Antana 70'	Al-Tilal
2011	Al-Oruba	Alao Fatai Adisa 14'	1–0		Al-Tilal
2012	Al-Shaab Ibb		1–1 (4–3 pen.)		Al-Ahli Taizz
2013	Al-Sha'ab Hadramaut		0–0 (4–1 pen.)		Al Yarmuk Al Rawda
2014	Al-Ahli San'a'		2–1		Al-Saqr

== Championships by team ==
Team	Champion	Runner-up	Years won	Years lost
Al-Ahli San'a'	4	—	2007, 2008, 2009, 2014	
Al-Saqr	1	1	2010	2014
Al-Oruba	1	—	2011	
Al-Sha'ab Hadramaut	1	—	2013	
Al-Shabab Ibb	1	—	2012	
Al-Tilal	—	3		2007, 2010, 2011
Al-Hilal	—	2		2008, 2009
Al-Ahli Taizz	—	1		2013
Al Yarmuk Al Rawda	—	1		2014

== See also ==
- Yemeni League
- Yemeni Cup
