= 2002 AFC U-17 Championship =

Tournament details
- Host country: United Arab Emirates
- Dates: 6–22 September
- Teams: 12 (from 1 confederation)

Final positions
- Champions: South Korea (2nd title)
- Runners-up: Yemen
- Third place: China
- Fourth place: Uzbekistan

Tournament statistics
- Matches played: 26
- Goals scored: 77 (2.96 per match)
- Best player: (South Korea) Cha Gi-suk

The 2002 AFC U-17 Championship was the 10th AFC U-17 Championship, which was held in the United Arab Emirates. South Korea defeated Yemen in the final round.

== Teams banned ==
Following the 2000 AFC U-17 Championship, in May 2001, 16 players were banned from international football for two years following X-ray tests that suggested they were at least 19 years old. Of the teams involved, Thailand had two. Nepal did not allow its players to be tested. These teams were banned from the 2002 AFC U-17 Championship.

== Qualification ==
- Group 1 : Yemen
- Group 2 : Syria
- Group 3 : Qatar
- Group 4 : India
- Group 5 : Uzbekistan
- Group 6 : Pakistan
- Group 7 : Myanmar
- Group 8 : South Korea
- Group 9 : China
- Group 10 : Vietnam
- Group 11 : Japan
- Host : United Arab Emirates

== Group stage ==
The first and second placed teams from each group qualified in addition to the two best third-placed teams qualified for the knockout stage.

=== Group A ===
Pos	Team	Pld	W	D	L	GF	GA	GD	Pts	Qualification
1	China	3	3	0	0	9	2	+7	9	Advance to knockout stage
2	United Arab Emirates	3	1	1	1	5	4	+1	4	Advance to knockout stage
3	India	3	1	1	1	6	6	0	4	Advance to knockout stage
4	Myanmar	3	0	0	3	4	12	−8	0	

6 September 2002

China	4–1	India

Abu Dhabi
6 September 2002

United Arab Emirates	4–2	Myanmar

Abu Dhabi

9 September 2002

China	1–0	United Arab Emirates

Abu Dhabi
9 September 2002

India	4–1	Myanmar

Abu Dhabi

12 September 2002

China	4–1	Myanmar

Abu Dhabi
12 September 2002

India	1–1	United Arab Emirates

Abu Dhabi

=== Group B ===
Pos	Team	Pld	W	D	L	GF	GA	GD	Pts	Qualification
1	South Korea	3	2	1	0	9	3	+6	7	Advance to knockout stage
2	Yemen	3	2	1	0	6	3	+3	7	Advance to knockout stage
3	Pakistan	3	0	1	2	2	6	−4	1	
4	Vietnam	3	0	1	2	2	7	−5	1	

7 September 2002

Vietnam	0–2	Yemen

Dubai
7 September 2002

Pakistan	0–3	South Korea

Dubai

10 September 2002

Vietnam	1–1	Pakistan

Dubai
10 September 2002

Yemen	2–2	South Korea

Dubai

13 September 2002

Vietnam	1–4	South Korea

Dubai
13 September 2002

Yemen	2–1	Pakistan

Dubai

=== Group C ===
Pos	Team	Pld	W	D	L	GF	GA	GD	Pts	Qualification
1	Uzbekistan	3	2	1	0	4	2	+2	7	Advance to knockout stage
2	Syria	3	1	1	1	2	2	0	4	Advance to knockout stage
3	Qatar	3	1	0	2	3	3	0	3	Advance to knockout stage
4	Japan	3	1	0	2	3	5	−2	3	

8 September 2002

Uzbekistan	2–1	Japan

Abu Dhabi
8 September 2002

Syria	1–0	Qatar

Abu Dhabi

11 September 2002

Uzbekistan	1–1	Syria

Abu Dhabi
11 September 2002

Japan	1–3	Qatar

Abu Dhabi

14 September 2002

Uzbekistan	1–0	Qatar

Abu Dhabi
14 September 2002

Japan	1–0	Syria

Abu Dhabi

=== Ranking of third-placed teams ===
Pos	Team	Pld	W	D	L	GF	GA	GD	Pts	Qualification
1	India	3	1	1	1	6	6	0	4	Advance to knockout stage
2	Qatar	3	1	0	2	3	3	0	3	Advance to knockout stage
3	Pakistan	3	0	1	2	2	6	–4	1	

== Knockout stage ==
=== Bracket ===
Quarter-finals
16 September
China	3
Qatar	1
17 September
Yemen	2
Syria	1
16 September
South Korea	3
India	1
17 September
Uzbekistan	3
United Arab Emirates	0

Semi-finals
20 September
China	0
Yemen	1
20 September
South Korea	4
Uzbekistan	0

Final
22 September
Yemen	1 (3)
South Korea (p)	1 (5)
Third place
22 September
China	1
Uzbekistan	0

=== Quarter-finals ===
16 September 2002

China	3–1	Qatar

Abu Dhabi
16 September 2002

South Korea	3–1	India

Abu Dhabi

17 September 2002

Uzbekistan	3–0	United Arab Emirates

Abu Dhabi
17 September 2002

Yemen	2–1	Syria

Abu Dhabi

=== Semi-finals ===
20 September 2002

China	0–1	Yemen

Abu Dhabi
20 September 2002

South Korea	4–0	Uzbekistan

Abu Dhabi

=== Third place match ===
22 September 2002

China	1–0	Uzbekistan

Abu Dhabi

=== Final ===
22 September 2002

Yemen	1–1	South Korea
Penalties
	3–5

Abu Dhabi

== Winners ==
AFC U-17 Championship 2002 winners

South Korea
Second title

== Teams qualified for 2003 FIFA U-17 World Championship ==
- South Korea
- Yemen
- China

== Sources ==
- rsssf.com
