= 2016–17 Al-Mina'a SC season =

Al-Mina'a SC
2016–17 season
- Chairman: Jalil Hanoon (until 5 February); Abdul Razzaq Ahmed (from 5 February)
- Manager: Marin Ion (until 18 April); Ghazi Fahad (from 24 April)
- Ground: Basra Sports City (temporary use)
- Premier League: 6th
- FA Cup: Semifinals
- Top goalscorer: League: Mohammed Shokan (13); All: Mohammed Shokan (14)
Home colours	Away colours

The 2016–17 season will be Al-Minaa's 41st season in the Iraqi Premier League, having featured in all 43 editions of the competition except two. Al-Minaa are participating in the Iraqi Premier League and the Iraq FA Cup.

They enter this season having finished in a disappointing sixth place in the league in the 2015–16 season, and will be looking to wrestle back the title they won in the 1977–78 season.

== Squad ==
Note: Flags indicate national team as defined under FIFA eligibility rules; some limited exceptions apply. Players may hold more than one non-FIFA nationality.

No.	Pos.	Nation	Player
1	GK	(Iraq) IRQ	Hameed Battal
2	DF	(Iraq) IRQ	Abbas Badie
3	DF	(Iraq) IRQ	Hamza Adnan
4	MF	(Iraq) IRQ	Yasser Ammar
5	MF	(Iraq) IRQ	Ahmed Mohsin Ashour
6	MF	(Iraq) IRQ	Hussam Malik
7	MF	(Iraq) IRQ	Hussein Abdul Wahed
9	MF	(Iraq) IRQ	Ammar Abdul Hussein (captain)
10	MF	(Iraq) IRQ	Mohammed Jabbar Shokan (vice-captain)
11	MF	(Iraq) IRQ	Hussein Hosni
14	MF	(Iraq) IRQ	Ali Qasim
15	DF	(Iraq) IRQ	Hussein Falah
16	DF	(Iraq) IRQ	Nadeem Karim

No.	Pos.	Nation	Player
17	DF	(Iraq) IRQ	Haidar Sari
18	FW	(Iraq) IRQ	Hussam Ibrahim
19	MF	(Ghana) GHA	Akwetey Mensah
20	GK	(Iraq) IRQ	Karrar Ibrahim
21	DF	(Iraq) IRQ	Herdi Siamand
22	GK	(Iraq) IRQ	Yassin Karim
23	DF	(Iraq) IRQ	Mohammed Jabbar Rubat
24	MF	(Iraq) IRQ	Ahmed Mohsin Jaber
27	MF	(Iraq) IRQ	Hamza Taleb
28	MF	(Iraq) IRQ	Ibrahim Kamil
30	MF	(Iraq) IRQ	Ahmed Jalil Hanoon
35	DF	(Iraq) IRQ	Abdullah Mohsin
40	DF	(Iraq) IRQ	Mustafa Nadhim

== Transfers ==
=== In ===
Date	Pos.	Name	From	Fee
June 2016	MF	(Iraq) Hussam Malik	(Iraq) Naft Al-Janoob	–
June 2016	MF	(Iraq) Hussein Abdul Wahed	(Iraq) Zakho	–
June 2016	MF	(Iraq) Safaa Hadi	(Iraq) Amanat Baghdad	–
June 2016	MF	(Iraq) Mustafa Hussein	(Iraq) Al-Sinaa	–
June 2016	DF	(Iraq) Herdi Siamand	(Iraq) Erbil	–
July 2016	MF	(Iraq) Yasser Ammar	(Iraq) Al-Sinaa	–
July 2016	DF	(Iraq) Mohammed Jabbar Rubat	(Iraq) Naft Al-Janoob	–
July 2016	DF	(Iraq) Abbas Badie	Youth system	–
July 2016	MF	(Iraq) Ahmed Jalil Hanoon	(Iraq) Naft Al-Janoob	–
August 2016	GK	(Iraq) Yassin Karim	(Iraq) Sulaymaniyah	–
August 2016	MF	(Iraq) Ahmed Mohsin Jaber	(Iraq) Amanat Baghdad	–
August 2016	MF	(Ghana) Akwetey Mensah	(Iraq) Al-Quwa Al-Jawiya	–
August 2016	FW	(El Salvador) David Rugamas	(El Salvador) Metapán	Loan
August 2016	MF	(Iraq) Ali Hosni	Free agent	–
August 2016	DF	(Iraq) Ali Mohammed Alialah	(Iraq) Amanat Baghdad	–
August 2016	MF	(Iraq) Ibrahim Kamil	(Oman) Salalah	–
August 2016	FW	(Brazil) Ricardinho	(El Salvador) Santa Tecla	Loan
January 2017	MF	(Iraq) Hussein Hosni	(Iraq) Naft Al-Janoob	–
January 2017	MF	(Iraq) Hamza Taleb	(Iraq) Al-Samawa	–
January 2017	GK	(Iraq) Noor Sabri	(Iraq) Al-Shorta	–
January 2017	FW	(Iraq) Hussam Ibrahim	(Iraq) Al-Kahraba	–
January 2017	DF	(Iraq) Nadeem Karim	(Iraq) Erbil	–
January 2017	DF	(Iraq) Mustafa Nadhim	(Iraq) Naft Al-Wasat	–
January 2017	FW	(Egypt) Ahmed Yasser	(Egypt) Al-Masry	Loan

=== Out ===
Date	Pos.	Name	To	Fee
June 2016	MF	(Libya) Abdul Hadi Zaqlam	End of contract	–
June 2016	FW	(Libya) Ali Al-Shareef	End of contract	–
June 2016	FW	(Brazil) Gleisson	End of contract	–
June 2016	MF	(Iraq) Ali Hosni	(Turkey) Çaykur Rizespor	–
June 2016	FW	(Iraq) Ziyad Ahmed	(Iraq) Naft Al-Wasat	–
June 2016	MF	(Iraq) Ahmed Jabbar	(Iraq) Naft Al-Wasat	–
June 2016	GK	(Iraq) Saqr Ajail	(Iraq) Amanat Baghdad	–
June 2016	GK	(Iraq) Medhat Abdul Hussein	(Iraq) Al-Bahri	–
June 2016	MF	(Iraq) Ahmad Abbas Hattab	(Iraq) Naft Al-Janoob	–
June 2016	MF	(Iraq) Jawad Kadhim	(Iraq) Al-Shorta	–
July 2016	DF	(Iraq) Ali Bahjat	(Iraq) Al-Quwa Al-Jawiya	–
July 2016	MF	(Iraq) Faisal Jassim	(Iraq) Al-Shorta	–
July 2016	DF	(Syria) Omar Midani	(Syria) Al-Wahda	–
September 2016	DF	(Iraq) Saad Attiya	(Iraq) Zakho	–
November 2016	FW	(El Salvador) David Rugamas	Released	–
November 2016	FW	(Brazil) Ricardinho	Released	–
December 2016	DF	(Iraq) Ali Mohammed Alialah	Released	–
December 2016	MF	(Iraq) Mustafa Hussein	Released	–
December 2016	MF	(Iraq) Safaa Hadi	Released	–
January 2017	MF	(Iraq) Ali Hosni	(Kuwait) Al-Arabi	Loan
June 2017	GK	(Iraq) Noor Sabri	Released	–
August 2017	FW	(Egypt) Ahmed Yasser	(Egypt) Al-Masry	End of loan

Updated to match played August 2017
Source: Al-Minaa SC: Transfers and News

== Technical staff ==
Position	Name
Coach	(Iraq) Ghazi Fahad
Assistant coach	(Iraq) Munir Jaber
Goalkeeping coach	(Iraq) Amer Abdul Wahab
Administrative director	(Iraq) Mohammed Nasser Shakroun
Club doctor	(Iraq) Faris Abdullah
Doctor's assistant	(Iraq) Fouad Mahdi

Updated to match played 24 April 2017
Source: Al-Minaa SC: Transfers and News

== Board members ==
President	(Iraq) Abdul Razzaq Ahmed
Secretary	(Iraq) Haider Oufi Ahmed
Treasurer	(Iraq) Hassan Mawla
Board of Directors Member	(Iraq) Abdul Mahdi Hadi
Board of Directors Member	(Iraq) Wasfi Ghazi Hussein
Board of Directors Member	(Iraq) Adnan Mohsin Bader
Board of Directors Member	(Iraq) Salem Hameed Mhawis

Updated to match played 5 February 2017
Source: Al-Minaa Club: Sailors of south

== Kit ==
Period	Home colours	Away colours	Supplier	Sponsor
September 2016 – October 2016			Uhlsport	—
October 2016 – May 2017			Adidas	Fuchs Petrolub
May 2017 –			Nike	Fuchs Petrolub

== Stadium ==
During the previous season, the stadium of Al-Mina'a demolished. A company will build a new stadium that will be completed in 2018. Since they can't play their games at Al Mina'a Stadium, they will be playing at Basra Sports City during this season.

== Pre-season ==
Win Draw Loss

16 August 2016 Friendly	Al-Mina'a (Iraq)	1–0	(Iraq) Ghaz Al-Janoob	Basra
14:00 GMT	Malik; Abu Kraisha (penalty missed)			Stadium: Basra Sports City

18 August 2016 Friendly	Al-Mina'a (Iraq)	5–1	(Iraq) Shortat Al-Basra	Basra
14:00 GMT	Malek; Adnan; Siamand; Abdul Hussein		Goal	Stadium: Basra Sports City

24 August 2016 Friendly	Al-Mina'a (Iraq)	3–1	(Iraq) Ghaz Al-Janoob	Basra
15:00 GMT	Hadi (penalty missed); Hanoon		Goal	Stadium: Basra Sports City

29 August 2016 Friendly	Al-Mina'a (Iraq)	2–1	(Iraq) Al-Zawraa	Antalya
14:00 GMT	Malik 20'; Abdul Wahed 42'		Salah 53'	Stadium: Akdeniz University Stadium

1 September 2016 Friendly	Al-Mina'a (Iraq)	4–1	(Iraq) Naft Al-Janoob	Antalya
14:00 GMT	Abdul Hussein 5', 53'; Malik 49'; Hadi 64'		Salah 56'	Stadium: Akdeniz University Stadium

3 September 2016 Friendly	Alanyaspor (Turkey)	4 –1	(Iraq) Al-Mina'a	Antalya
14:00 GMT			Abdul Hussein	Stadium: Alanya Oba Stadium

5 September 2016 Friendly	Eğirdirspor (Turkey)	1–2	(Iraq) Al-Mina'a	Antalya
14:00 GMT	87' (pen.)		Ricardinho 15'; Hussein 67'	Stadium: Cumhuriyet Stadium

6 September 2016 Friendly	Kepezspor (Turkey)	2–2	(Iraq) Al-Mina'a	Antalya
14:00 GMT	41'; 76'		Rugamas 18'; Malik 87'	Stadium: Kepez Sahası Stadium

24 March 2017 Friendly	Al-Mina'a (Iraq)	1– 0	Turkmenistan	Antalya, Turkey
08:30 GMT	Yasser 30'			Attendance: Akdeniz University Stadium

== Iraqi Premier League ==
=== Summary table ===
Overall								Home						Away					
Pld	W	D	L	GF	GA	GD	Pts	W	D	L	GF	GA	GD	W	D	L	GF	GA	GD
36	18	12	6	40	24	+16	66	13	4	1	28	10	+18	5	8	5	12	14	−2

Last updated: 10 August 2017.
Source: Goalzz.com

=== Results by matchday ===
Matchday	1	2	3	4	5	6	7	8	9	10	11	12	13	14	15	16	17	18	19	20	21	22	23	24	25	26	27	28	29	30	31	32	33	34	35	36
Ground	H	A	H	A	H	A	A	H	A	H	A	H	H	A	A	H	H	A	A	H	A	H	A	H	H	A	H	A	H	H	A	A	H	A	A	H
Result	W	L	W	D	W	W	D	W	D	D	L	W	L	W	D	W	W	L	W	D	D	W	D	W	W	D	W	L	D	W	L	D	D	W	W	W
Position	1	6	4	5	2	2	3	3	4	3	6	5	6	6	6	6	5	7	6	6	6	5	5	4	4	4	4	5	6	6	6	6	6	6	6	6

Updated to match(es) played on 10 August 2017. Source: Goalzz.com
A = Away; H = Home; W = Win; D = Draw; L = Loss

=== Matches ===
Win Draw Loss

15 September 2016 1	Al-Mina'a	3 – 1	Al-Hussein	Basra
12:45 GMT	Shokan 13' (penalty missed) 18'; Abdul Wahed 60'; Hosni 68'	Sportgram report	Karim 75'	Stadium: Basra Sports City; Referee: Sabah Abed

21 September 2016 2	Al-Bahri	2 – 1	Al-Mina'a	Basra
12:45 GMT	Saad 70', 85'; Abdul Hassein (yellow card) 68'		Hosni 44'; Abdul Hussein (yellow card) 46'; Alialah (yellow card) 59'; Abdul Wahed (yellow card) 90+2'	Stadium: Az-Zubayr Stadium; Referee: Mohammed Tareq

26 September 2016 3	Al-Mina'a	1 – 0	Al-Naft	Basra
12:30 GMT	Shokan 41'			Stadium: Basra Sports City; Referee: Mohanad Qasim

16 October 2016 4	Al-Samawa	0 – 0	Al-Mina'a	Samawa
12:30 GMT				Stadium: As Samawah Stadium; Referee: Zaid Thamer

21 October 2016 5	Al-Mina'a	1 – 0	Naft Maysan	Basra
12:30 GMT	Shokan 21'			Stadium: Basra Sports City; Referee: Salem Amer

26 October 2016 6	Al-Karkh	0 – 1	Al-Mina'a	Baghdad
12:30 GMT			Abdul Hussein 68'	Stadium: Al Karkh Stadium

31 October 2016 7	Al-Hedood	1 – 1	Al-Mina'a	Baghdad
12:00 GMT	Embo 80'		Malik 72'	Stadium: Baghdad Stadium

26 November 2016 8	Al-Mina'a	3 – 1	Zakho	Basra
11:00 GMT	Hosni 5'; Shokan 27' (pen.); Abdul Wahed 31'		Haji 13'	Stadium: Basra Sports City

1 December 2016 9	Al-Kahraba	0 – 0	Al-Mina'a	Baghdad
14:00 GMT				Stadium: Al Kahraba Stadium

6 December 2016 10	Al-Mina'a	1 – 1	Al-Zawra'a	Basra
14:00 GMT	Akwetey 47'		Abdul-Zahra 37'	Stadium: Basra Sports City; Referee: Mohammed Tareq

11 December 2016 11	Al-Quwa Al-Jawiya	2 – 1	Al-Mina'a	Baghdad
12:30 GMT	Ahmad 52'; Mohsin 70'		Hosni 61'	Stadium: Al-Quwa Al-Jawiya Stadium; Referee: Haitham Mohammed Ali

16 December 2016 12	Al-Mina'a	1 – 0	Karbalaa	Basra
15:00 GMT	Malek 66'			Stadium: Basra Sports City

26 December 2016 13	Al-Mina'a	0 – 1	Naft Al-Janoob	Basra
19:00 GMT			Adamu 29'	Stadium: Basra Sports City; Referee: Mohanad Qasim

31 December 2016 14	Amanat Baghdad	0 – 1	Al-Mina'a	Baghdad
11:30 GMT			Shokan 37'	Stadium: Baghdad Stadium; Referee: Haitham Mohammed Ali

7 January 2017 15	Naft Al-Wasat	0 – 0	Al-Mina'a	Najaf
15:30 GMT	Nadhim (yellow card) 27'; Al-Shbli (yellow card) 48'; Al-Alousi (yellow card) 60'			Stadium: An-Najaf Stadium; Referee: Mohammed Ghani

12 January 2017 16	Al-Mina'a	2 – 1	Al-Najaf	Basra
15:30 GMT	Shokan 17', 66' (yellow card) 90+2'; Malik (yellow card) 86'		Qabel 39'; Karim (yellow card) 75'; Hameed (yellow card) 82'	Stadium: Basra Sports City; Referee: Mohammed Sadek

17 January 2017 17	Al-Mina'a	1 – 0	Al-Talaba	Basra
15:30 GMT	Hosni (penalty missed) 17' 75'; Falah (yellow card) 85'		Abdul Mohsin (yellow card) 77'; Arzeej (yellow card) 78'; Dally (yellow card) 90+4'	Stadium: Basra Sports City; Referee: Haitham Mohammed Ali

23 January 2017 18	Al Shorta	1 – 0	Al-Mina'a	Baghdad
11:30 GMT	Mohammed 59'			Stadium: Al-Shaab Stadium; Referee: Ali Sabah

24 February 2017 19	Al-Hussein	0 – 1	Al-Mina'a	Baghdad
11:00 GMT			Malik 77' (pen.)	Stadium: Al-Sader City Stadium; Referee: Mohanad Qasim

1 March 2017 20	Al-Mina'a	2 – 2	Al-Bahri	Basra
13:30 GMT	Ibrahim 54'; Shokan 83'		Hadi 24' (yellow card) 65'; Athab (yellow card) 34' (goal) 64'; Abdul-Hussein (yellow card) 86'	Stadium: Basra Sports City; Referee: Salem Amer

6 March 2017 21	Al-Naft	0 – 0	Al-Mina'a	Baghdad
12:00 GMT				Stadium: Al-Naft Stadium

10 March 2017 22	Al-Mina'a	2 – 0	Al-Samawa	Basra
13:00 GMT	Shokan 29'; Malik 42'; Abdul Wahed (yellow card) 53'			Stadium: Basra Sports City; Referee: Haitham Mohammed Ali

14 March 2017 23	Naft Maysan	1 – 1	Al-Mina'a	Amarah
12:00 GMT	Saeed 65'; Fernando (yellow card) 21'; Hanoon (yellow card) 66'		Shokan 6'; Omega (yellow card) 26'; Siamand (yellow card) 57'	Stadium: Al-Maimuna Stadium; Referee: Dhiaa Jandeel

3 April 2017 24	Al-Mina'a	4 – 0	Al-Karkh	Basra
12:00 GMT	Shokan 20', 58' (pen.); Yasser 23', 66'			Stadium: Basra Sports City; Referee: Sabah Abed

7 April 2017 25	Al-Mina'a	1 – 0	Al-Hedood	Basra
13:00 GMT	Falah (yellow card) 45+2'; Omega 58'; Akwetey (yellow card) 88'; Abdul Wahed (yellow card) 90+7'		Obaid (yellow card) 34'; Mahmood (yellow card) 88'	Stadium: Basra Sports City; Referee: Mohanad Qasim

12 April 2017 26	Zakho	0 – 0	Al-Mina'a	Zakho
13:00 GMT			Yasser (yellow card) 81'	Stadium: Zakho International Stadium; Referee: Ayad Zahef

18 April 2017 27	Al-Mina'a	2 – 1	Al-Kahraba	Basra
13:00 GMT	Ibrahim 45+3'; Malik 90+4' (yellow card) 90+4'		Aoda 90+2'	Stadium: Basra Sports City; Referee: Sabah Abed

6 May 2017 28	Al-Zawra'a	4 – 1	Al-Mina'a	Baghdad
15:00 GMT	Abdul-Zahra 27', 49'; Kalaf 74'; Gassid (yellow card) 76'; Al Saedi 88'		Yasser (yellow card) 30'; Adnan 43' (yellow card) 44'; Siamand (yellow card) 60'; Shokan (yellow card) 76'	Stadium: Al-Shaab Stadium; Referee: Zaid Thamer

10 May 2017 29	Al-Mina'a	1 – 1	Al-Quwa Al-Jawiya	Basra
17:00 GMT	Yasser 72'; Akwetey (yellow card) 80'		Mohsin 64'	Stadium: Basra Sports City; Referee: Salem Amer

20 June 2017 30	Al-Mina'a	1 – 0	Naft Al-Wasat	Basra
19:00 GMT	Yasser 32'; Abdul Hussein (yellow card) 90+1'		Bayesh (yellow card) 45'; Al-Shbli (yellow card) 55'	Stadium: Basra Sports City; Referee: Wathek Mohammed

1 July 2017 31	Karbalaa	1 – 0	Al-Mina'a	Karbalaa
16:00 GMT	Jassim 13'			Stadium: Karbala Sports City; Referee: Salem Amer

6 July 2017 32	Naft Al-Janoob	0 – 0	Al-Mina'a	Basra
17:00 GMT	Faisal (yellow card) 42'; Hussein (yellow card) 62'		Kamil (yellow card) 68'; Falah (yellow card) 75'	Stadium: Basra Sports City; Referee: Mohanad Qasim

10 July 2017 33	Al-Mina'a	1 – 1	Amanat Baghdad	Basra
17:00 GMT	Yasser 78'		Yousif 15'	Stadium: Basra Sports City; Referee: Zaid Thamer

1 August 2017 34	Al-Najaf	2 – 3	Al-Mina'a	Najaf
13:45 GMT	Sabah 35', 57'		Shokan 17'; Malik 23'; Abu Kraisha 90+2'	Stadium: An-Najaf Stadium

5 August 2017 35	Al-Talaba	0 – 1	Al-Mina'a	Baghdad
13:45 GMT	Nadhim (yellow card) 67'; Jabbar (yellow card) 70'; Saleem (yellow card) 75'; Sattar (yellow card) 90+1'		Omega (yellow card) 8'; Malik 26'; Akwetey (yellow card) 64'; Siamand (yellow card) 70'; Abdul Hussein (yellow card) 89'	Stadium: Al-Shaab Stadium; Referee: Yousuf Saeed

10 August 2017 36	Al-Mina'a	1 – 0	Al-Shorta	Basra
13:45 GMT	Abdul Hussein 45'; Akwetey (yellow card) 45+2'; Siamand (yellow card) 58'; Abu Kraisha (yellow card) 67'		Tariq (yellow card) 71'; Mohammed (yellow card) 87'	Stadium: Basra Sports City; Referee: Mohanad Qasim

== Iraq FA Cup ==
Win Draw Loss

30 March 2017 Round of 32	Al-Mina'a	4 – 1	Al-Sinaat Al-Kahrabaiya	Basra
12:00 GMT	Yasser 23' (pen.) (yellow card) 25' (penalty missed) 72'; Akwetey (yellow card) 48'; Shokan 50'; Abdul Hussein 70'; Malik 72'		Faisal (yellow card) 20'; Flaih 45+1'; Fazzaa (yellow card) 71'	Stadium: Basra Sports City; Referee: Ahmed Majid

14 August 2017 Round of 16	Al-Hurr	0 – 0 (3–4 p)	Al-Mina'a	Karbalaa
13:30 GMT				Stadium: Karbalaa Stadium; Referee: Sabah Abed

17 August 2017 Quarter-finals	Al-Mina'a	3 – 0 (w/o)	Al-Hedood	Basra
13:30 GMT				Stadium: Basra Sports City

20 August 2017 Semifinals	Naft Al-Wasat	1 – 1 (4–3 p)	Al-Mina'a	Najaf
13:30 GMT	Nomi (yellow card) 23'; Bayesh (yellow card) 48'; Attwan 50'; Abbas (yellow card) 84'		Adnan (yellow card) 45+3'; Kamil (yellow card) 48'; Hosni 68'	Stadium: Naft Al-Wasat Stadium; Referee: Zaid Thamer
	Penalties
	Hassoun (penalty scored); Nomi (penalty scored); Bayesh (penalty missed); Shakor (penalty scored); Attwan (penalty scored)		(penalty scored) Ammar; (penalty scored) Nadhim; (penalty scored) Hosni; (penalty missed) Malik; (penalty missed) Adnan

== Statistics ==
=== Squad information ===
As of 20 August 2017

No.	Pos	Nat	Player	Total		Iraqi Premier League		Iraq FA Cup	
No.	Pos	Nat	Player	Apps	Goals	Apps	Goals	Apps	Goals
3	DF	(Iraq) IRQ	Hamza Adnan	27	1	24	1	3	0
4	MF	(Iraq) IRQ	Yasser Ammar	5	0	3	0	2	0
5	MF	(Iraq) IRQ	Ahmed Mohsin Ashour	32	1	30	1	2	0
6	MF	(Iraq) IRQ	Hussam Malik	35	8	32	7	3	1
7	MF	(Iraq) IRQ	Hussein Abdul Wahed	35	2	32	2	3	0
9	MF	(Iraq) IRQ	Ammar Abdul Hussein	37	3	34	2	3	1
10	MF	(Iraq) IRQ	Mohammed Jabbar Shokan	33	14	31	13	2	1
12	FW	(Egypt) EGY	Ahmed Yasser	15	6	14	5	1	1
14	MF	(Iraq) IRQ	Ali Qasim	0	0	0	0	0	0
15	DF	(Iraq) IRQ	Hussein Falah	34	0	31	0	3	0
16	DF	(Iraq) IRQ	Nadeem Karim	1	0	1	0	0	0
17	DF	(Iraq) IRQ	Haidar Sari	18	0	17	0	1	0
18	FW	(Iraq) IRQ	Hussam Ibrahim	10	2	9	2	1	0
19	MF	(Ghana) GHA	Akwetey Mensah	26	1	24	1	2	0
20	GK	(Iraq) IRQ	Karrar Ibrahim	7	0	5	0	2	0
21	DF	(Iraq) IRQ	Herdi Siamand	36	0	34	0	2	0
22	GK	(Iraq) IRQ	Yassin Karim	27	0	25	0	2	0
23	DF	(Iraq) IRQ	Mohammed Jabbar Rubat	10	0	10	0	0	0
24	MF	(Iraq) IRQ	Ahmed Mohsin Jaber	25	1	23	1	2	0
25	GK	(Iraq) IRQ	~~Noor Sabri~~	7	0	7	0	0	0
28	MF	(Iraq) IRQ	Ibrahim Kamil	27	0	24	0	3	0
30	MF	(Iraq) IRQ	Ahmed Jalil Hanoon	4	0	4	0	0	0
35	DF	(Iraq) IRQ	Abdullah Mohsin	27	0	26	0	1	0
40	DF	(Iraq) IRQ	Mustafa Nadhim	17	0	14	0	3	0
Players out on loan for rest of the season
8	MF	(Iraq) IRQ	Ali Hosni	18	6	17	5	1	1

=== Top scorers ===
Rank	Pos.	Nationality	No.	Name	Iraqi Premier League	Iraq FA Cup	Total
1	MF	(Iraq)	10	Mohammed Jabbar Shokan	13	1	14
2	MF	(Iraq)	6	Hussam Malik	7	1	8
3	FW	(Egypt)	12	Ahmed Yasser	5	1	6
3	MF	(Iraq)	8	Ali Hosni	5	1	6
4	MF	(Iraq)	9	Ammar Abdul Hussein	2	1	3
5	MF	(Iraq)	7	Hussein Abdul Wahed	2	0	2
5	FW	(Iraq)	18	Hussam Ibrahim	2	0	2
6	MF	(Ghana)	19	Akwetey Mensah	1	0	1
6	MF	(Iraq)	24	Ahmed Mohsin Jaber	1	0	1
6	MF	(Iraq)	5	Ahmed Mohsin Ashour	1	0	1
6	DF	(Iraq)	3	Hamza Adnan	1	0	1
Own goals					0	0	0
TOTALS					40	5	45

Last updated: 20 August 2017

=== Clean sheets ===
Rank	Nationality	Number	Name	Iraqi Premier League	Iraq FA Cup	Total
1	(Iraq)	22	Yassin Karim	15	0	15
2	(Iraq)	25	~~Noor Sabri~~	3	0	3
3	(Iraq)	20	Karrar Ibrahim	1	1	2
TOTALS				19	1	20

Last updated: 14 August 2017

=== Penalties ===
Date	Name	Opponent	Result
15 September 2016	(Iraq) Mohammed Jabbar Shokan	Al-Hussein	No
25 November 2016	(Iraq) Mohammed Jabbar Shokan	Zakho	Yes
17 January 2017	(Iraq) Ali Hosni	Al-Talaba	No
24 February 2017	(Iraq) Hussam Malik	Al-Hussein	Yes
30 March 2017	(Egypt) Ahmed Yasser	Al-Sinaat Al-Kahrabaiya	Yes
30 March 2017	(Egypt) Ahmed Yasser	Al-Sinaat Al-Kahrabaiya	No
3 April 2017	(Iraq) Mohammed Jabbar Shokan	Al-Karkh	Yes

=== Overall statistics ===
	League	Cup	Total Stats
Games played	36	3	39
Games won	18	1	19
Games drawn	12	2	14
Games lost	6	0	6
Goals scored	40	5	45
Goals conceded	24	2	26
Goal difference	+16	+3	+19
Clean sheets	19	1	20
Goal by Substitute	4	1	5
Yellow cards	36	4	40
Red cards	0	0	0

Last updated: 20 August 2017

== Sources ==
- FIFA.COM
- Iraqi League 2015/2016
- Al-Minaa SC: Transfers and News
