= 2015–16 Al-Mina'a SC season =

Al-Mina'a SC
2015–16 season
- Chairman: Omran Radhi Thani (until 13 March); Jalil Hanoon (from 13 March)
- Manager: Hussam Al Sayed
- Ground: Basra Sports City (temporary use)
- Iraqi Premier League: 6th
- Iraq FA Cup: Second round
- Top goalscorer: League: Omar Khribin (10); All: Omar Khribin (10)
Home colours	Away colours

The 2015–16 season was Al-Minaa's 40th season in the Iraqi Premier League, having featured in all 42 editions of the competition except two.

== Squad ==
Note: Flags indicate national team as defined under FIFA eligibility rules; some limited exceptions apply. Players may hold more than one non-FIFA nationality.

No.	Pos.	Nation	Player
1	GK	IRQ	Hameed Battal
2	DF	IRQ	Saad Attiya
3	DF	IRQ	Hamza Adnan
4	DF	SYR	Omar Midani
5	MF	IRQ	Ahmed Mohsin Ashour
6	DF	IRQ	Ali Bahjat
7	FW	BRA	Gleisson
8	MF	IRQ	Ali Hosni
9	MF	IRQ	Ammar Abdul Hussein
10	MF	IRQ	Mohammed Jabbar Shokan (vice-captain)
11	MF	IRQ	Jawad Kadhim
12	GK	IRQ	Medhat Abdul Hussein
14	MF	IRQ	Ali Qasim
15	DF	IRQ	Hussein Falah

No.	Pos.	Nation	Player
17	DF	IRQ	Haidar Sari
18	FW	IRQ	Ziyad Ahmed
19	FW	LBY	Ali Al-Shareef
20	GK	IRQ	Karrar Ibrahim (captain)
21	MF	IRQ	Ahmad Abbas Hattab
22	GK	IRQ	Saqr Ajail
24	DF	IRQ	Faisal Jassim
25	MF	IRQ	Ahmed Jabbar
28	MF	LBY	Abdul Hadi Zaqlam
30	MF	IRQ	Ali Majed
31	DF	IRQ	Mustafa Ali Abbas
32	MF	IRQ	Ali Tahseen
33	MF	IRQ	Hussein Muslim
35	DF	IRQ	Abdullah Mohsin

== Players Data ==
As of November 2015

No.	Name	Nationality	Position(s)	Date of birth (age)	Signed from	Since	Games	Goals
Goalkeepers
12	Medhat Abdul Hussein	(Iraq)	GK	21 October 1985 (age 40)	Naft Al-Janoob	August 2015	0	0
20	Karrar Ibrahim	(Iraq)	GK	19 September 1994 (age 31)	Youth system	September 2009	90	1
22	Saqr Ajail	(Iraq)	GK	3 January 1993 (age 33)	Amanat Baghdad	July 2015	2	0
Defenders
2	Saad Attiya	(Iraq)	CB	26 February 1987 (age 38)	Al-Quwa Al-Jawiya	December 2014	24	0
3	Hamza Adnan	(Iraq)	LB	8 February 1996 (age 29)	Youth system	September 2012	42	1
4	Omar Midani	(Syria)	CB/LB	26 January 1994 (age 32)	Al-Wahda	August 2014	23	1
6	Ali Bahjat	(Iraq)	CB	3 March 1992 (age 33)	Al-Shorta	December 2015	0	0
15	Hussein Falah	(Iraq)	RB	1 July 1994 (age 31)	Duhok	February 2014	23	0
17	Haidar Sari	(Iraq)	LB/AM	17 August 1997 (age 28)	Youth system	September 2012	21	1
24	Faisal Jassim	(Iraq)	RB	1 July 1986 (age 39)	Al-Quwa Al-Jawiya	August 2015	7	0
35	Abdullah Mohsin	(Iraq)	CB	27 May 1994 (age 31)	Youth system	September 2012	26	0
Midfielders
5	Ahmed Mohsin Ashour	(Iraq)	CM	4 January 1996 (age 30)	Youth system	September 2012	29	3
8	Ali Hosni	(Iraq)	LW/RW	1 October 1994 (age 31)	Youth system	September 2012	67	12
9	Ammar Abdul Hussein	(Iraq)	LW	13 February 1992 (age 33)	Al-Shorta	July 2015	87	9
10	Mohammed Jabbar Shokan	(Iraq)	CAM/LW/RW	21 March 1993 (age 32)	Al-Quwa Al-Jawiya	September 2013	96	12
11	Jawad Kadhim	(Iraq)	RW	14 October 1993 (age 32)	Al-Naft	August 2015	4	0
14	Ali Qasim	(Iraq)	CM/DM	15 March 1996 (age 29)	Youth system	November 2013	36	0
21	Ahmad Abbas Hattab	(Iraq)	CM/DM	9 May 1994 (age 31)	Al-Shorta	December 2015	0	0
25	Ahmed Jabbar	(Iraq)	DM	10 September 1992 (age 33)	Al-Talaba	July 2015	6	0
28	Abdul Hadi Zaqlam	(Libya)	CM/DM	18 June 1994 (age 31)	Al-Hilal	August 2015	7	1
Forwards
7	Gleisson	(Brazil)	ST	3 May 1982 (age 43)	Duque de Caxias	September 2014	16	5
18	Ziyad Ahmed	(Iraq)	ST	13 May 1992 (age 33)	Duhok	July 2015	6	1
19	Ali Al-Shareef	(Libya)	ST	3 February 1989 (age 36)	Al-Hilal	September 2015	5	0

== Transfers ==
=== In ===
Date	Pos.	Name	From	Fee
July 2015	MF	(Iraq) Ammar Abdul Hussein	(Iraq) Al-Shorta	Undisclosed
July 2015	GK	(Iraq) Saqr Ajail	(Iraq) Amanat Baghdad	Undisclosed
July 2015	MF	(Iraq) Ahmed Jabbar	(Iraq) Al-Talaba	Undisclosed
July 2015	DF	(Iraq) Ali Hussein	(Iraq) Najaf	Undisclosed
July 2015	FW	(Iraq) Ziyad Ahmed	(Iraq) Duhok	Undisclosed
August 2015	FW	(Syria) Omar Khribin	(Iraq) Al-Quwa Al-Jawiya	Undisclosed
August 2015	MF	(Iraq) Jawad Kadhim	(Iraq) Al-Naft	Undisclosed
August 2015	GK	(Iraq) Medhat Abdul Hussein	(Iraq) Naft Al-Janoob	Undisclosed
August 2015	DF	(Iraq) Faisal Jassim	(Iraq) Al-Quwa Al-Jawiya	Undisclosed
August 2015	MF	(Iraq) Ghiyath Shokor	(Iraq) Peshmerga Hawler	Undisclosed
September 2015	MF	(Libya) Abdul Hadi Zaqlam	(Libya) Al-Hilal	Undisclosed
September 2015	FW	(Libya) Ali Al-Shareef	(Libya) Al-Hilal	Undisclosed
September 2015	GK	(Iraq) Hameed Battal	Youth system	Undisclosed
September 2015	DF	(Iraq) Mustafa Ali Abbas	Youth system	Undisclosed
September 2015	MF	(Iraq) Ali Tahseen	Youth system	Undisclosed
September 2015	MF	(Iraq) Ali Majed	Youth system	Undisclosed
November 2015	MF	(Iraq) Ahmed Abbas	(Iraq) Al-Shorta	Undisclosed
December 2015	DF	(Iraq) Ali Bahjat	(Iraq) Al-Shorta	Undisclosed
March 2016	FW	(Brazil) Gleisson	Free agent	Undisclosed

=== Out ===
Date	Pos.	Name	To	Fee
July 2015	MF	(Brazil) Júnior	End of contract	–
July 2015	FW	(Brazil) Gleisson	End of contract	–
July 2015	MF	(Iraq) Omar Alaa Ahmed	End of contract	–
July 2015	DF	(Iraq) Ali Jassim	End of contract	–
July 2015	FW	(Iraq) Hussein Ali Wahed	(Iraq) Al-Shorta	Undisclosed
July 2015	MF	(Iraq) Hussein Abdul Wahed	(Iraq) Al-Shorta	Undisclosed
July 2015	DF	(Iraq) Mohammed Abdul Karim	(Iraq) Naft Al-Janoob	Undisclosed
August 2015	GK	(Iraq) Amjad Rahim	(Iraq) Al-Shorta	Undisclosed
September 2015	MF	(Syria) Hamid Mido	(Iraq) Al-Quwa Al-Jawiya	Undisclosed
December 2015	DF	(Iraq) Ali Hussein		Released
December 2015	MF	(Iraq) Ghiyath Shokor		Released
December 2015	FW	(Syria) Omar Khribin	(United Arab Emirates) Al-Dhafra	Undisclosed

Updated to match played December 2015
Source: Al-Minaa SC: Transfers and News

== Technical staff ==
Position	Name
Coach	(Syria) Hussam Al Sayed
Assistant coach	(Iraq) Ahmad Rahim
Fitness coach	(Iraq) Waleed Juma
Goalkeeping coach	(Iraq) Aqeel Abdul Mohsin
Club doctor	(Iraq) Faris Abdullah
Doctor's assistant	(Iraq) Fouad Mahdi

Updated to match played July 2015
Source: Al-Minaa SC: Transfers and News

== Board members ==
President	(Iraq) Jalil Hanoon
Amanuensis	(Iraq) Mohammad Jaber Hassan
Board of Directors Member	(Iraq) Naji Abdulla Hassan Al Mosawi
Board of Directors Member	(Iraq) Nazar Taha Humood
Board of Directors Member	(Iraq) Nabeel Abdul Ameer Jamil
Board of Directors Member	(Iraq) Ali Fadhel Hassan
Board of Directors Member	(Iraq) Karim Jasim Hassan
Female Board Member	(Iraq) Ikhlas Naji Jasim

Updated to match played 13 March 2016
Source: Al-Minaa SC: Transfers and News

== Kit ==
Period	Home colours	Away colours	Supplier	Sponsor
September 2015 – November 2015			Uhlsport	—
November 2015 – February 2016			Lescon	Elaph Islamic Bank
February 2016 – May 2016			Select	Elaph Islamic Bank

== Stadium ==
During the previous season, the stadium of Al-Mina'a demolished. A company will build a new stadium that will be completed in 2016. Since they can't play their games at Al Mina'a Stadium, they will be playing at Basra Sports City during this season.

== Friendlies ==
Win Draw Loss

21 August 2015 Friendly	Al-Mina'a (Iraq)	0–0	Bahrain	İzmit, Turkey
08:30 GMT				Stadium: The Green Park Kartepe Resort

23 August 2015 Friendly	Al-Mina'a (Iraq)	1–0	Libya	İzmit, Turkey
08:30 GMT	Ziyad Ahmed 15'			Stadium: İzmit stadium

27 August 2015 Friendly	Al-Mina'a (Iraq)	2–0	Jordan U-22	İzmit, Turkey
12:30 GMT	Ziyad Ahmed 22'; Hamid Mido 36'			Stadium: The Green Park Kartepe Resort

5 September 2015 Friendly	Al-Karkh (Iraq)	1–0	(Iraq) Al-Mina'a	Baghdad, Iraq
12:30 GMT	Saad Fawzi 77'			Stadium: Al Karkh Stadium

7 September 2015 Friendly	Al-Naft (Iraq)	0–0	(Iraq) Al-Mina'a	Baghdad, Iraq
12:30 GMT				Stadium: Al Naft Stadium

9 October 2015 Friendly	Al-Mina'a (Iraq)	3–1	(Iraq) Al-Bahri	Basra, Iraq
12:30 GMT	Mohammed Jabbar Shokan; Ammar Abdul Hussein		.	Stadium: Basra Sports City

== Iraqi Premier League ==
=== Group stage : Group – 2 ===
==== Summary table ====
Overall								Home						Away					
Pld	W	D	L	GF	GA	GD	Pts	W	D	L	GF	GA	GD	W	D	L	GF	GA	GD
18	9	5	4	27	16	+11	32	5	3	1	17	7	+10	4	2	3	10	9	+1

Last updated: 4 March 2016.
Source: Goalzz.com

==== Results by matchday ====
Matchday	1	2	3	4	5	6	7	8	9	10	11	12	13	14	15	16	17	18
Ground	A	H	H	A	H	A	A	H	A	H	A	A	H	A	H	H	A	H
Result	D	W	L	W	W	W	W	W	L	D	L	L	D	D	D	W	W	W
Position	4	3	4	3	2	1	1	1	1	1	2	3	3	3	2	2	2	2

Updated to match(es) played on 4 March 2016. Source: Goalzz.com
A = Away; H = Home; W = Win; D = Draw; L = Loss

==== Matches ====
Win Draw Loss

Away matches

15 September 2015 1	Zakho	1–1	Al-Mina'a	Zakho
12:30 GMT	Sattar Yasin (yellow card) 8'; Raiber Mohammed (yellow card) 55'; Mihai Leca 76'; Safaa Jabbar (yellow card) 85'	Al-Minaa report	Abdul Hadi Ibrahim (yellow card) 12'; Omar Khribin 73'	Stadium: Dalal Stadium; Attendance: (nil) Punishment from IFA; Referee: Mohammed Tareq Ahmed

20 September 2015 2	Al-Mina'a	3–1	Erbil	Basra
12:30 GMT	Omar Khribin 4', 90+1'; Ziyad Ahmed 81'		Miram Karim 90+5'	Stadium: Basra Sports City; Referee: Mohanad Qasim

25 September 2015 3	Al-Mina'a	0–2	Amanat Baghdad	Basra
15:00 GMT	Karrar Ibrahim (yellow card) 90+4'		Ahmed Mohsin (yellow card) 24'; Marwan Abbas (yellow card) 69'; Sattar Jabbar (yellow card) 77'; Mustafa Ahmed 81'; Muthana Khalid (yellow card) 90+1'; Redha Nasrallah 90+5' (pen.)	Stadium: Basra Sports City; Referee: Mohammed Ghani

30 September 2015 4	Al-Quwa Al-Jawiya	1–2	Al-Mina'a	Baghdad
12:30 GMT	Hammadi Ahmad (yellow card) 45+2'; Saad Natik (yellow card) 52'; Hammadi Ahmad 89'		Abdul Hadi Ibrahim 14'; Ammar Abdul Hussein (yellow card) 16'; Faisal Jassim (yellow card) 25'; Abdul Hadi Ibrahim (yellow card) 45'; Ali Hosni (red card) 90+4'; Hamza Adnan 90+6'	Stadium: Al-Quwa Al-Jawiya Stadium; Referee: Salim Amer

15 October 2015 5	Al-Mina'a	2–0	Karbalaa	Basra
15:00 GMT	Ahmed Jabbar (yellow card) 34'; Karrar Ibrahim (red card) 38'; Omar Khribin 60'; Ammar Abdul Hussein 87'; Mohammed Jabbar Shokan (yellow card) 90'		Hussein Jamal (red card) 38'; Noor Al Mustafa (yellow card) 45+3'	Stadium: Basra Sports City; Referee: Tahseen Ali

20 October 2015 6	Al-Hedood	0–2	Al-Mina'a	Baghdad
12:00 GMT	Hussein Hakim (red card) 81'		Omar Khribin 14', 82'; Saad Attiya (yellow card) 25'; Hamza Adnan (yellow card) 53'; Abdul Hadi Ibrahim (yellow card) 72'	Stadium: Baghdad Stadium; Referee: Ali Al-Hadi Ibrahim

27 October 2015 7	Al Shorta	0–1	Al-Mina'a	Baghdad
11:30 GMT	Ahmad Fadhel (yellow card) 64'; Nabeel Sabah (yellow card) 74'; Ahmad Al Salih (yellow card) 75'	Alamalsport report	Omar Khribin 31'; Ahmed Jabbar (yellow card) 52'; Mohammed Jabbar Shokan (yellow card) 74'; Omar Khribin (yellow card) 78'	Stadium: Al Karkh Stadium; Referee: Watheq Mohammed

6 November 2015 8	Al-Mina'a	4–1	Al-Sinaa	Basra
11:30 GMT	Faisal Jassim (yellow card) 10'; Ammar Abdul Hussein (yellow card) 44'; Omar Khribin 50', 90'; Abdullah Mohsin (yellow card) 63'; Ali Hosni 72'; Abu Kraisha 79'; Hamza Adnan (yellow card) 81'; Saad Attiya (red card) 86'		Hassan Atwan (yellow card) 40'; Abbas Juma (red card) 60'; Mahmoud Khalil 75'	Stadium: Basra Sports City; Referee: Falah Abed

8 December 2015 9	Najaf	1–0	Al-Mina'a	Najaf
11:00 GMT	Saeed Mohsen 82'; Ali Qassim (yellow card) 86'		Ali Hosni (yellow card) 86'	Stadium: An Najaf Stadium; Referee: Salim Amer

Home matches

13 December 2015 10	Al-Mina'a	1–1	Zakho	Basra
11:00 GMT	Ammar Abdul Hussein 26'		Abdelsalam Al Faitori 58'	Stadium: Basra Sports City; Referee: Falah Abed

17 December 2015 11	Erbil	3–1	Al-Mina'a	Erbil
11:00 GMT	Mohammed Jaffal 56' (pen.); Ahmed Abdul Ameer 58'; Kosrat Baez 90'		Ali Bahjat (red card) 55'; Faisal Jassim (yellow card) 67'; Omar Khribin 70'	Stadium: Franso Hariri Stadium; Referee: Yousif Saeed

2 January 2016 12	Karbalaa	3–1	Al-Mina'a	Karbalaa
11:00 GMT	Jabbar Karim 23', 63'; Alaa Abbas 90'		Ammar Abdul Hussein 72'	Stadium: Karbala Stadium

7 February 2016 13	Amanat Baghdad	0–0	Al-Mina'a	Baghdad
11:00 GMT				Stadium: Baghdad Stadium

11 February 2016 14	Al-Mina'a	1–1	Al-Quwa Al-Jawiya	Basra
11:00 GMT	Abdullah Mohsin 62'		Emad Mohsin 90'	Stadium: Basra Sports City

16 February 2016 15	Al-Mina'a	1–1	Al-Hedood	Basra
11:00 GMT	Mohammed Jabbar Shokan 49' (pen.)		Manar Taha 6'	Stadium: Basra Sports City

24 February 2016 16	Al-Mina'a	2–0	Al Shorta	Basra
11:00 GMT	Ali Bahjat 58' (pen.); Ammar Abdul Hussein 88'			Stadium: Basra Sports City

29 February 2016 17	Al-Sinaa	1–2	Al-Mina'a	Baghdad
11:00 GMT	Aqeel Khairi 67'		Ali Bahjat 47'; Ali Hosni 75'	Stadium: Baghdad Stadium

4 March 2016 18	Al-Mina'a	3–0	Najaf	Basra
11:00 GMT				Stadium: Basra Sports City

=== Final stage ===
==== Results by matchday ====
Matchday	1	2	3	4	5	6	7
Ground	H	A	H	H	A	A	A
Result	W	L	W	D	L	L	D
Position	3	4	2	3	4	5	6

Updated to match(es) played on 20 May 2016. Source: Goalzz
A = Away; H = Home; W = Win; D = Draw; L = Loss

==== Matches ====
2 April 2016 1	Al-Mina'a	1–0	Al-Quwa Al-Jawiya	Basra
15:30 GMT	Mohammed Jabbar Shokan 82'			Stadium: Basra Sports City; Referee: Mohanad Qasim

9 April 2016 2	Al-Naft	3–2	Al-Mina'a	Baghdad
15:30 GMT	Mostfa Jowda 49'; Hussam Kadhem 71'; Dhul Fuqar Aed 84'		Ali Bahjat 17'; Ziyad Ahmed 86'	Stadium: Al-Shaab Stadium; Referee: Wathiq Mohammed

15 April 2016 3	Al-Mina'a	1–0	Amanat Baghdad	Basra
15:30 GMT	Mohammed Jabbar Shokan 3'			Stadium: Basra Sports City

24 April 2016 4	Al-Mina'a	2–2	Al Shorta	Basra
15:30 GMT				Stadium: Basra Sports City

8 May 2016 5	Al-Talaba	1–0	Al-Mina'a	Baghdad
15:30 GMT				Stadium: Al-Shaab Stadium

15 May 2016 6	Al-Zawraa	5–1	Al-Mina'a	Baghdad
15:30 GMT				Stadium: Al-Shaab Stadium

20 May 2016 7	Naft Al-Wasat	2–2	Al-Mina'a	Baghdad
15:30 GMT				Stadium: Al-Shaab Stadium

== Iraq FA Cup ==
11 November 2015 Second round	Al-Hussein	2 – 1 (w/o)	Al-Mina'a	Baghdad
10:30 GMT	Taha 32'; Ali Sabri 106'		Ali Al-Shareef 21'	Stadium: Sadr City Stadium

== Squad statistics ==
No.	Pos.	Nat.	Name	Apps	Goals	Yellow card	Red card
1	GK	IRQ	Hameed Bakkal	0	0	0	0
2	DF	IRQ	Saad Attiya	11	0	2	1
3	DF	IRQ	Hamza Adnan	10 (1)	1	2	0
4	DF	SYR	Omar Midani	4	0	0	0
5	MF	IRQ	Ahmed Mohsin Ashour	1 (3)	1	0	0
6	DF	IRQ	Ali Bahjat	1	0	0	1
7	FW	SYR	Omar Khribin	10	10	1	0
8	MF	IRQ	Ali Hosni	7 (1)	1	1	1
9	MF	IRQ	Ammar Abdul Hussein	8 (3)	2	2	0
10	MF	IRQ	Mohammed Jabbar Shokan	8 (2)	0	3	0
11	MF	IRQ	Jawad Kadhim	1 (4)	0	0	0
12	GK	IRQ	Medhat Abdul Hussein	0	0	0	0
14	MF	IRQ	Ali Qasim	9	0	0	0
15	DF	IRQ	Hussein Falah	1 (1)	0	0	0
17	DF	IRQ	Haidar Sari	0 (2)	0	0	0
18	FW	IRQ	Ziyad Ahmed	6 (1)	1	0	0
19	FW	LBY	Ali Al-Shareef	3 (4)	0	0	0
20	GK	IRQ	Karrar Ibrahim	10	0	1	1
21	MF	IRQ	Ahmad Abbas Hattab	0	0	0	0
22	GK	IRQ	Saqr Ajail	1 (1)	0	0	0
24	DF	IRQ	Faisal Jassim	10	0	3	0
25	MF	IRQ	Ahmed Jabbar	4 (3)	0	2	0
28	MF	LBY	Abdul Hadi Zaqlam	9 (1)	1	4	0
30	MF	IRQ	Ali Majed	0	0	0	0
31	DF	IRQ	Mustafa Ali Abbas	0	0	0	0
32	MF	IRQ	Ali Tahseen	0	0	0	0
33	MF	IRQ	Hussein Muslim	0	0	0	0
35	DF	IRQ	Abdullah Mohsin	7 (1)	0	1	0

Last updated: 17 December 2015.
Source: Goalzz.com

== Top scorers ==
As of 20 May 2016

#	Name	Goals	Caps	Goal ratio
1	Omar Khribin	10	10	1
2	Mohammed Jabbar Shokan	6	22	0.11
3	Ammar Abdul Hussein	4	19	0.21
4	Ali Bahjat	3	10	0.3
5	Ali Hosni	3	17	0.13
6	Ziyad Ahmed	2	11	0.2
7	Ahmed Mohsin Ashour	1	9	0.12
8	Abdul Hadi Zaqlam	1	17	0.06
9	Hamza Adnan	1	20	0.05
10	Abdullah Mohsin	1	13	0.07

== Sources ==
- FIFA.COM
- Iraqi League 2015/2016
- Al-Minaa SC: Transfers and News
