= List of Iraqi football transfers summer 2024 =

This is a list of Iraqi football transfers for the 2024 summer transfer window. Besides the Iraqi transfers abroad section, only clubs contesting the 2024–25 Iraq Stars League and 2024–25 Iraqi Premier Division League are listed.

The transfer window in Iraq started on 2 August and will end on 2 October 2024. By 2 October, all clubs in the Iraq Stars League and the Iraqi Premier Division League must submit a 25-man squad for the season, with no more than 6 foreign players. Players from Syria and Yemen count as local players.

== Iraq Stars League ==
=== Al-Hudood ===
In:

No.	Pos.	Nation	Player
—	FW	MTN	Mouhamed Soueid (from Al-Talaba)
—	MF	COL	Harlin Suárez (from (Colombia) Cúcuta Deportivo)
—	DF	IRQ	Ahmed Abdul-Ridha (from Al-Naft)
—	FW	BRA	Paulo Victor (from (Indonesia) Persebaya)
—	MF	IRQ	Abbas Majid (from Al-Talaba)
—	DF	IRQ	Hayder Ahmed (from Al-Kahrabaa)
—	MF	IRQ	Ali Mohsin (from Erbil)
—	FW	IRQ	Shirwan Kurdistan (from Newroz)
—	DF	COL	Stiwar Mena (from (Guatemala) Comunicaciones)
—	FW	IRQ	Mohammed Jameel (from Al-Naft)
—	MF	IRQ	Atheer Salih (from Al-Shorta on loan)
—	DF	JOR	Salem Al-Ajalin (from (Jordan) Al-Faisaly)

Out:

No.	Pos.	Nation	Player
2	DF	IRQ	Hamza Abdul-Hussein (to Amanat Baghdad)
5	DF	CIV	Alexandre Yeoulé (to Naft Maysan)
6	MF	IRQ	Yassir Naeem (to Diyala)
7	FW	IRQ	Ibrahim Ghazi (to Al-Zawraa)
11	FW	IRQ	Muntadher Adel (to Al-Kahrabaa)
12	DF	IRQ	Karrar Salim (to Al-Naft)
20	FW	IRQ	Abbas Adel (to Al-Quwa Al-Jawiya)
22	FW	IRQ	Mahmoud Ahmed (to Naft Al-Basra)
30	GK	IRQ	Wissam Mohammed (to Diyala)
33	MF	CMR	Nathaniel Nangolo (to Diyala)
35	DF	BRA	Breno Calixto (to (Kuwait) Al-Fahaheel)
36	FW	GHA	Sampson Eduku (to Al-)
40	MF	CMR	Junior Awono (to Al-)
66	DF	IRQ	Mahmoud Khudhair (to Al-Karma)
88	MF	IRQ	Mohammed Jumaa (to Masafi Al-Wasat)
99	FW	IRQ	Ali Kareem (to Diyala)
—	DF	JOR	Salem Al-Ajalin (to (Jordan) Al-Faisaly)

=== Al-Kahrabaa ===
In:

No.	Pos.	Nation	Player
—	DF	IRQ	Khudhur Ali (from Al-Zawraa)
—	GK	IRQ	Amjad Rahim (from Naft Maysan)
—	FW	IRQ	Karrar Alaa (from Al-Naft)
—	MF	IRQ	Mohammed Haitham (from Al-Jolan)
—	MF	IRQ	Murtadha Hedaib (from Newroz)
—	MF	IRQ	Mohammed Zamel (from Al-Najaf)
—	DF	IRQ	Sattar Jabbar (from Al-Najaf)
—	FW	IRQ	Muntadher Adel (from Al-Hudood)
—	GK	IRQ	Mohammed Ahmed (from Al-Naft)
—	GK	IRQ	Mohammed Abbas (from Al-Karkh)
—	DF	IRQ	Hussam Kadhim (from Al-Zawraa)
—	MF	IRQ	Amir Hassan (from Al-Najaf)
—		IRQ	Ali Al-Karrar Ahmed (from Al-Kahrabaa youth)
—		IRQ	Hassan Jaafer (from Al-Kahrabaa youth)
—	DF	IRQ	Ali Kareem (from Al-Zawraa youth)
—	FW	NGR	David Ikegoba (from Al-)
—	MF	GHA	Farouk Mohammed (from (Nigeria) Rivers United)
—	DF	NGR	Aniyikaye Adeleye (from (Nigeria) Shooting Stars)
—	DF	NGR	Gbolagade Adelowo (from (Nigeria) Shooting Stars)
—	FW	BRA	Ruan Teles (from (Brazil) Jacuipense)

Out:

No.	Pos.	Nation	Player
—	MF	IRQ	Ali Jassim (to (Italy) Como)
1	GK	IRQ	Ali Ebadi (to Al-Quwa Al-Jawiya)
5	DF	IRQ	Saif Hatem (to Al-Karma)
6	DF	IRQ	Najm Shwan (to Duhok)
7	MF	IRQ	Al-Muntasser Bellah Fouad (to Diyala)
9	FW	IRQ	Mustafa Al-Ameen (to Masafi Al-Wasat)
10	FW	SEN	Daouda Diémé (to Naft Maysan)
11	FW	CMR	Anael Ngoba (to Al-)
13	MF	IRQ	Hayder Ahmed (to Al-Hudood)
16	MF	SYR	Zaher Midani (to Al-)
17	FW	GHA	Dennis Tetteh (to Al-Jolan)
19	DF	IRQ	Mohammed Salam (to Naft Maysan)
21	MF	IRQ	Ivan Khalid (to Erbil)
23	GK	IRQ	Ammar Ali (to Erbil)
24	DF	GHA	Nartey Polo (to Al-)
29	MF	IRQ	Ali Al-Sajjad (to Naft Al-Basra)
30	FW	SEN	Ibrahima Diop (to Al-)
33	FW	GHA	Shafiu Mumuni (to Al-Jolan)
55	MF	IRQ	Murtadha Ali (to Al-Najaf)
77	GK	IRQ	Abdullah Faisal (to Al-Jolan)
80	FW	IRQ	Nabeel Sabah (to Al-)
90	FW	IRQ	Mahmoud Khalil (to Al-Karma)
97	FW	GHA	Rafiq Aminu (to Al-)
—	FW	IRQ	Mohammed Emad (to Al-Karkh)

=== Al-Karkh ===
In:

No.	Pos.	Nation	Player
12	GK	IRQ	Mohammed Shakir (from Al-Quwa Al-Jawiya)
11	MF	IRQ	Mosab Jamal (from Al-Talaba)
—	DF	IRQ	Alaa Mhawi (from Al-Najaf)
—	FW	IRQ	Wakaa Rammdan (from Al-Talaba)
3	DF	IRQ	Hamza Adnan (from Al-Najaf)
—	DF	CIV	Ali Qasim (from Al-)
99	FW	JOR	Mohannad Abu Taha (from (Jordan) Al-Wehdat)
66	MF	CGO	Christ Kouvouama (from (Jordan) Al-Wehdat)
25	DF	IRQ	Mohammed Mustafa (from Naft Al-Basra)
—	FW	IRQ	Mohammed Emad (from Al-Kahrabaa)
—	DF	IRQ	Hussein Fahim (from Al-Talaba)
—	DF	IRQ	Sajjad Hussein (from Al-Diwaniya)
—	FW	IRQ	Haider Ali Hussein (from Al-Shorta youth)
7	FW	NGR	Ifeanyi Eze (from (Libya) Al-Hilal)
—	DF	MAR	Anass Nouader (from (Morocco) Oujda)
—	MF	IRQ	Ali Qasim (from Naft Al-Wasat)
—	MF	IRQ	Jassim Mohammed (from Amanat Baghdad)
—	MF	IRQ	Hussein Zeyad (from Amanat Baghdad)
—	MF	IRQ	Ahmed Zeyad (to Al-)

Out:

No.	Pos.	Nation	Player
1	GK	IRQ	Hayder Mohammed (to Al-Quwa Al-Jawiya)
6	MF	CMR	Didier Talla (to Al-Fahad)
12	DF	IRQ	Rafed Talib (to Al-)
14	FW	GHA	Cosmos Dauda (to Al-)
18	DF	IRQ	Mustafa Irmayyidh (to Al-Fahad)
21	GK	IRQ	Mohammed Abbas (to Al-Kahrabaa)
25	FW	IRQ	Anas Malik (to Diyala)
29	MF	IRQ	Hayder Ahmed (to Al-)
30	MF	IRQ	Hassan Mohammed (to Al-)
39	FW	IRQ	Aba-Thar Abdulsada (to Masafi Al-Wasat)
45	MF	NIG	Boubacar Djibrill Goumey (to Al-)
50	FW	IRQ	Ahmed Abdulrazaq (to Al-Jolan)

=== Al-Karma ===
In:

No.	Pos.	Nation	Player
2	DF	IRQ	Mahmoud Khudhair (from Al-Hudood)
3	DF	BRA	Jeferson Bahia (from (Iran) Foolad)
5	DF	IRQ	Saif Hatem (from Al-Kahrabaa)
6	MF	BRA	Wenderson (from (Brazil) América-RN)
7	FW	IRQ	Ali Husni (from Al-Shorta)
8	MF	IRQ	Sajjad Raad (from Karbala)
9	FW	CMR	Frank Cédric Abogo (from Zakho)
11	FW	NGR	John Okoli (from (Libya) Asswehly)
13	FW	YEM	Omar Al-Dahi (from (Bahrain) Al-Najma)
16	MF	IRQ	Shihab Razzaq (from Al-Quwa Al-Jawiya)
17	DF	IRQ	Abdullah Khalaf (from Naft Al-Wasat)
18	MF	ANG	Herenilson (from (Libya) Al-Ahli Tripoli)
20	GK	IRQ	Mohammed Hameed (from Al-Quwa Al-Jawiya)
21	DF	TUN	Najeh Ferjani (from (Tunisia) Béja)
23	MF	IRQ	Mohammed Mezher (from Al-Shorta)
24	DF	IRQ	Mohammed Al-Baqer (from Al-Quwa Al-Jawiya on loan)
29	DF	IRQ	Abbas Qasim (from Al-Zawraa)
90	FW	IRQ	Mahmoud Khalil (from Al-Kahrabaa)

Out:

No.	Pos.	Nation	Player
23	DF	IRQ	Kosrat Baiz (to Diyala)
—	MF	BRA	Bruno Dybal (to (Indonesia) Padang)
—	FW	IRQ	Assad Abdullah (to Karbala)
—	MF	BRA	Dioguinho (to Al-Nasiriya)
—	DF	BRA	Bruno Oliveira (to Al-Jolan)
—	DF	BRA	Enck (to Al-Jolan)
—	MF	IRQ	Abbas Manea (to Al-Sinaat Al-Kahrabaiya)
—	FW	YEM	Gehad Abdulrab (to Al-Mosul)
—	MF	IRQ	Mohammed Al-Dahi (to Al-)

=== Al-Minaa ===
In:

No.	Pos.	Nation	Player
1	GK	IRQ	Abdulsaleem Hammad (from Amanat Baghdad)
2	DF	ESP	Raúl Parra (from (Portugal) Praia)
5	DF	IRQ	Hussein Amer (from Naft Maysan)
7	FW	ESP	Lolo Coronado (from (Spain) Talavera)
8	MF	IRQ	Sumar Almadjed (from Duhok)
10	FW	IRQ	Alaa Abdul-Zahra (from Al-Shorta)
11	FW	IRQ	André Alsanati (from (Sweden) Sirius)
13	MF	TUN	Abdallah Amri (from (Tunisia) Sfax)
14	FW	IRQ	Muntadher Qahtan (from Al-Minaa youth)
16	FW	IRQ	Zainulabdeen Jassim (from Al-Minaa youth)
19	MF	SWE	Hamid Abdulla (from (Sweden) Rosengård)
21	GK	IRQ	Abbas Kareem (from Al-Shorta on loan)
25	MF	IRQ	Ameer Ahmed (from Al-Naft)
31	DF	ZAM	Gerald Takwara (from (Saudi Arabia) Ohod)
39	MF	IRQ	Naji Nasser (from Al-Minaa youth)
79	FW	COD	Tuisila Kisinda (from (Morocco) Berkane)
88	FW	IRQ	Mohannad Abdul-Raheem (from Al-Quwa Al-Jawiya)
—	MF	GAB	Clech Loufilou (from (Oman) Sur)
—	FW	IRQ	Ali Mohammed Hatem (from (Spain) Las Rozas on trial)
—	MF	IRQ	Hassan Hameed Khalaf (from Al-Minaa youth)

Out:

No.	Pos.	Nation	Player
1	GK	IRQ	Mohammed Saadoun (to Masafi Al-Junoob)
2	DF	IRQ	Abdullah Mohsin (to Al-)
3	DF	IRQ	Zain Al-Abidin Hussein (to Al-)
4	DF	IRQ	Emad Yousif (to Al-)
5	MF	IRQ	Ahmed Mohsin Ashour (to Al-)
7	MF	IRQ	Ayad Abed Farhan (to Newroz)
9	FW	LBR	William Jebor (to Karbala)
10	MF	IRQ	Mohammed Shokan (to Al-)
11	MF	IRQ	Hatim Aysar (to Al-Bahri)
14	DF	CIV	Habib Omar Fofana (to Diyala)
16	MF	CIV	Yusuf Touré (to (Tunisia) Tunisien)
17	DF	IRQ	Muntadher Hassan (to Al-Sinaat Al-Kahrabaiya)
19	DF	IRQ	Hassan Odah (to Al-Bahri)
27	MF	NGR	Dare Olatunji (to Naft Maysan)
28	MF	IRQ	Hamza Hadi Ahmed (to Al-)
29	DF	IRQ	Karrar Al-Amir Ali (to Al-Bahri)
50	GK	IRQ	Mohammed Sabah (to Al-)

=== Al-Naft ===
In:

No.	Pos.	Nation	Player
5	DF	CMR	Joel Tchofo (from Karbala)
8	MF	IRQ	Ammar Ghalib (from Al-Shorta)
12	MF	IRQ	Karrar Salim (from Al-Hudood)
14	FW	AUS	Ali Auglah (from (Australia) Macarthur)
16	MF	IRQ	Ali Majid (from Naft Al-Wasat)
17	FW	IRQ	Saif Eldin Dhaher (from Al-Qasim)
18	FW	NGR	Valentine Odoh (from (Egypt) Haras El Hodoud)
20	GK	IRQ	Hayder Jamal (from Naft Al-Basra)
25	MF	IRQ	Sattar Yassin (from Newroz)
32	FW	CMR	Ramses Donfack (from (Armenia) Ararat)
35	DF	IRQ	Ahmed Khalid (from Newroz)
42	FW	IRQ	Mohammed Ali Waheed (from Al-Shorta youth)
43	MF	IRQ	Aws Firas (from Al-Ramadi)
55	MF	GHA	Mohammed Sadat (from (Ghana) Al-)
70	FW	YEM	Ahmed Al-Sarori (from Al-Quwa Al-Jawiya)
77	MF	BFA	Sami Hien (from Karbala)
80	MF	IRQ	Mustafa Qassim (from Al-Talaba)
99	FW	IRQ	Hussam Jadallah (from Naft Al-Basra)
—	GK	IRQ	Hussein Mohammed (from Al-Naft youth)
—	MF	IRQ	Ahmed Jasim (from Al-Naft youth)
—	MF	IRQ	Ahmed Ali Abdullah (from Al-Naft youth)

Out:

No.	Pos.	Nation	Player
6	MF	IRQ	Ammar Dakhel (to Al-Qasim)
7	MF	IRQ	Ali Raheem (to Al-)
15	DF	IRQ	Ahmed Naeem (to Al-Najaf)
16	MF	IRQ	Ali Jumaa (to Al-)
24	MF	IRQ	Hassan Dakhel (to Al-Najaf)
25	MF	IRQ	Ameer Ahmed (to Al-Minaa)
30	FW	IRQ	Karrar Alaa (to Al-Kahrabaa)
32	FW	NGR	Ndifreke Effiong (to Al-)
44	DF	TOG	Klousseh Agbozo (to (Tunisia) Tunisien)
55	DF	IRQ	Ahmed Abdul-Ridha (to Al-Hudood)
77	MF	NGR	Ezekiel Tamara (to Al-)
80	FW	GHA	Joseph Akomadi (to Al-)
99	FW	NGR	Okiki Afolabi (to Naft Maysan)
—	GK	IRQ	Mohammed Ahmed (to Al-Kahrabaa)

=== Al-Najaf ===
In:

No.	Pos.	Nation	Player
—	DF	IRQ	Ahmed Naeem (from Al-Naft)
—	MF	IRQ	Hassan Dakhel (from Al-Naft)
—	FW	IRQ	Ridha Mohammed Hachem (from Al-Zawraa)
—	MF	IRQ	Ahmed Abdul-Hussein (from Naft Al-Wasat)
—	DF	SEN	Moustapha Fall (from (France) Châteauroux)
—	FW	GHA	Denny Antwi (from Al-Talaba)
—	DF	IRQ	Ali Faez (from Al-Talaba)
—	FW	IRQ	Mohammed Jawad (from Al-Talaba)
—	DF	IRQ	Ahmed Maknzi (from Erbil)
—	GK	IRQ	Ali Kadhem (from Naft Al-Wasat)
—	DF	IRQ	Mustafa Maan (from Al-Zawraa)
—	MF	JOR	Rajaei Ayed (from (Jordan) Al-Hussein)
—	FW	IRQ	Zidane Abdul-Jabbar (from Al-Shorta)
—	FW	NGR	Iyayi Atiemwen (from (North Macedonia) Gostivar)
—	MF	IRQ	Murtadha Ali (from Al-Kahrabaa)

Out:

No.	Pos.	Nation	Player
3	DF	IRQ	Hamza Adnan (to Al-Karkh)
4	DF	IRQ	Muntadher Sattar (to Diyala)
6	MF	MLI	Makan Samabaly (to Karbala)
8	MF	IRQ	Taher Hameed (to Naft Al-Wasat)
15	DF	IRQ	Hussein Falah (to Naft Maysan)
17	FW	IRQ	Mueen Ahmed (to Newroz)
20	MF	IRQ	Amir Hassan (to Al-Kahrabaa)
27	MF	IRQ	Omar Abdul-Rahman (to Diyala)
30	FW	TUN	Hazim Mestouri (to (Tunisia) Monastir)
55	DF	IRQ	Ahmed Noor (to Al-Qasim)
66	DF	IRQ	Mohammed Al-Baqer (to Al-Qasim)
70	DF	IRQ	Alaa Mhawi (to Al-Karkh)
77	MF	IRQ	Mohammed Zamel (to Al-Kahrabaa)

=== Al-Qasim ===
In:

No.	Pos.	Nation	Player
1	GK	IRQ	Laith Maan (from Erbil)
8	MF	IRQ	Al-Hareth Hatam (from Karbala)
10	FW	IRQ	Ahmed Sartip (from Zakho)
17	FW	IRQ	Hussein Abdul-Wahid (from Naft Al-Wasat)
18	FW	GHA	Karim Abubakar (from (Spain) Águilas)
20	MF	CIV	Elie Sou (from (Ivory Coast) SOL)
31	MF	IRQ	Aysar Qasim (from (Sweden) Dalkurd)
66	DF	IRQ	Mohammed Al-Baqer (from Al-Najaf)
—	MF	IRQ	Ammar Dakhel (from Al-Naft)
—	MF	IRQ	Muamel Rashed (from Al-)
—	DF	IRQ	Ahmed Noor (from Al-Najaf)
—	GK	IRQ	Ali Khalid (from Al-Quwa Al-Jawiya)
—	DF	GHA	Edward Sarpong (from (Malta) Birkirkara)
—	DF	CMR	Serge Andoulo (from (Guinea) Hafia)
—	DF	JOR	Mo Abualnadi (from (Jordan) Al-Hussein)
—	FW	IRQ	Hayder Abdulraheem (from Naft Maysan)
—	DF	CIV	Abdoul Aziz Siahoune (from (Ethiopia) Bahirdar)

Out:

No.	Pos.	Nation	Player
1	GK	IRQ	Ahmed Shakir (to Naft Al-Basra)
4	DF	IRQ	Karrar Noor (to Naft Al-Wasat)
7	MF	IRQ	Murtadha Kassad (to Naft Maysan)
8	MF	IRQ	Al-Hareth Hatam (to Karbala)
10	FW	IRQ	Alaa Mohaisen (to Naft Al-Basra)
11	MF	IRQ	Yousif Ayad (to Masafi Al-Wasat)
17	FW	IRQ	Saif Eldin Dhaher (to Al-Naft)
18	DF	IRQ	Haider Majed (to Maysan)
34	MF	IRQ	Ameer Mohammed (to Al-Sinaat Al-Kahrabaiya)
40	GK	IRQ	Ali Jassim (to Diyala)
—	FW	IRQ	Abboud Rabah (to Al-Sinaat Al-Kahrabaiya)
—	DF	MLI	Siaka Bagayoko (to (Democratic Republic of the Congo) Vita)
—	FW	NGR	Emmanuel Ogude (to (Finland) VPS)
—	DF	CIV	Abdoul Aziz Siahoune (to Al-Mosul)

=== Al-Quwa Al-Jawiya ===
In:

No.	Pos.	Nation	Player
10	MF	IRQ	Hiran Ahmed (from Duhok)
77	MF	IRQ	Mohammed Sami (from Newroz)
26	FW	IRQ	Mohammed Qasim (from Erbil)
6	MF	IRQ	Ali Shakhwan (from Erbil)
15	MF	NGR	Ahmed Isaiah (from (Azerbaijan) Qabala)
19	MF	ARG	Jonathan Bustos (from (Indonesia) Sleman)
20	MF	COL	Carlos Enrique (from (Portugal) Torreense)
3	DF	FRA	Arnold Temanfo (from (France) Dijon)
29	DF	FRA	Gerald Kilota (from (Belgium) Seraing)
—	DF	IRQ	Hayder Altai (from (Norway) Grorud)
7	MF	IRQ	Safaa Hadi (from (Iran) Tractor)
13	MF	IRQ	Bashar Resan (from (Qatar) Al-Markhiya)
24	FW	IRQ	Ridha Fadhil (from Amanat Baghdad)
1	GK	IRQ	Ali Ebadi (from Al-Kahrabaa)
31	GK	IRQ	Mohammed Raheem (from Newroz)
12	GK	IRQ	Hayder Mohammed (from Al-Karkh)
—	MF	IRQ	Abdullah Hassoon (from Karbala)
27	FW	IRQ	Abbas Adel (from Al-Hudood)
—	FW	IRQ	Mushtaq Talib (from Karbala)
9	FW	IRQ	Alaa Abbas (from Al-Zawraa)
23	DF	IRQ	Zaid Tahseen (from Al-Talaba)
11	FW	COL	Carlos Salazar (from (El Salvador) Águila)

Out:

No.	Pos.	Nation	Player
2	DF	TUN	Ghaith Maaroufi (to Al-Talaba)
4	DF	IRQ	Saad Natiq (to Al-Talaba)
6	DF	IRQ	Sameh Saeed (to Al-)
7	MF	IRQ	Shareef Abdul-Kadhim (to Al-Talaba)
8	MF	IRQ	Ibrahim Bayesh (to (Saudi Arabia) Al-Riyadh)
9	FW	IRQ	Aymen Hussein (to (Qatar) Al-Khor)
11	MF	IRQ	Humam Tariq (to Zakho)
12	GK	IRQ	Mohammed Shakir (to Al-Karkh)
13	MF	TOG	Franco Atchou (to Al-)
15	MF	RWA	Djabel Manishimwe (to Naft Al-Wasat)
16	MF	IRQ	Shihab Razzaq (to Al-Karma)
20	GK	IRQ	Mohammed Hameed (to Al-Karma)
24	DF	IRQ	Hassan Raed (to Al-Shorta)
29	DF	BOL	Pablo Pedraza (from Al-)
34	GK	IRQ	Ali Khalid (to Al-Qasim)
38	DF	ARG	Hugo Silva (from Al-)
66	DF	IRQ	Mohammed Al-Baqer (to Al-Karma on loan)
77	FW	YEM	Ahmed Al-Sarori (to Al-Naft)
88	FW	IRQ	Mohannad Abdul-Raheem (to Al-Minaa)
—	MF	COL	Ronny Rodríguez (to (India) Rajasthan)
—	FW	IRQ	Ali Akbar Taher (to (Saudi Arabia) Al-Fatah on loan)
—	GK	IRQ	Sajjad Nihad (from Al-)
—	DF	IRQ	Hayder Altai (to (Norway) Skeid)

=== Al-Shorta ===
In:

No.	Pos.	Nation	Player
3	DF	ALG	Djamel Benlamri (from (Algeria) Alger)
5	MF	IRQ	Rewan Amin (from Duhok)
8	DF	IRQ	Akam Hashim (from Erbil)
12	DF	IRQ	Hassan Raed (from Al-Quwa Al-Jawiya)
19	FW	JOR	Mohammed Sharara (from (Jordan) Al-Wehdat)
21	GK	IRQ	Hassan Ahmed (from Zakho)
23	FW	ESP	Omar Waleed (from (Spain) Unión on trial)

Out:

No.	Pos.	Nation	Player
3	DF	IRQ	Karrar Amer (to (Kuwait) Al-Nasr)
8	FW	IRQ	Zidane Abdul-Jabbar (to Al-Najaf)
10	FW	IRQ	Alaa Abdul-Zahra (to Al-Minaa)
12	GK	IRQ	Yassin Karim (to Al-Talaba)
13	FW	IRQ	Ali Husni (to Al-Karma)
16	MF	IRQ	Mohammed Mezher (to Al-Karma)
26	FW	IRQ	Dhulfiqar Younis (to Duhok on loan)
32	GK	IRQ	Abbas Kareem (to Al-Minaa on loan)
99	FW	IRQ	Aso Rostam (to Newroz)
—	MF	IRQ	Ammar Ghalib (to Al-Naft on loan)
—	MF	IRQ	Atheer Salih (to Al-Hudood on loan)

=== Al-Talaba ===
In:

No.	Pos.	Nation	Player
—	DF	IRQ	Saad Natiq (from Al-Quwa Al-Jawiya)
—	MF	IRQ	Shareef Abdul-Kadhim (from Al-Quwa Al-Jawiya)
—	GK	IRQ	Fahad Talib (from Unattached)
—	GK	IRQ	Yassin Karim (from Al-Shorta)
10	MF	IRQ	Louai Al-Ani (from Al-Zawraa)
—	DF	YEM	Hamza Al-Rimi (from (Bahrain) Isa Town)
—	DF	TUN	Ghaith Maaroufi (from Al-Quwa Al-Jawiya)
—	FW	TAN	Simon Msuva (from (Saudi Arabia) Al-Najma)
—	DF	CMR	Ngweni Ndassi (from (Saudi Arabia) Jeddah)
—	FW	CMR	Ronald Ngah (from (Jordan) Al-Faisaly)
—	FW	NGR	Austin Amutu (from (Saudi Arabia) Al-Jandal)
—	MF	TUN	Habib Oueslati (from (Cyprus) Karmiotissa)
—	DF	IRQ	Karrar Amer (from (Kuwait) Al-Nasr)
—	MF	IRQ	Humam Tariq (from Zakho)

Out:

No.	Pos.	Nation	Player
3	DF	TUN	Wael Ben Othmane (to)
5	DF	IRQ	Ali Faez (to Al-Najaf)
6	DF	IRQ	Niaz Mohammed (to Erbil)
10	FW	IRQ	Wakaa Rammdan (to Al-Karkh)
11	FW	TUN	Ouday Belhaj (to)
13	DF	MAR	Mohammad Bentarcha (to (Morocco) Fès)
16	MF	IRQ	Karrar Nabeel (to Al-Zawraa)
20	MF	IRQ	Moammel Abdulridha (to (Iran) Esteghlal)
22	GK	IRQ	Hassan Ahmed (to Zakho)
23	DF	IRQ	Zaid Tahseen (to Al-Quwa Al-Jawiya)
25	MF	IRQ	Abbas Majid (to Al-Hudood)
26	FW	IRQ	Mosab Jamal (to Al-Karkh)
33	FW	GHA	Denny Antwi (to Al-Najaf)
75	GK	IRQ	Dolvan Mahdi (to Karbala)
77	MF	NIG	Yussif Moussa (to)
80	MF	IRQ	Mustafa Qassim (to Al-Naft)
88	DF	IRQ	Mustafa Moayed (to Naft Al-Basra)
91	FW	MTN	Mouhamed Soueid (to Al-Hudood)

=== Al-Zawraa ===
In:

No.	Pos.	Nation	Player
9	FW	IRQ	Ibrahim Ghazi (from Al-Hudood)
3	DF	IRQ	Sajjad Mahdi (from Naft Maysan)
16	MF	IRQ	Karrar Nabeel (from Al-Talaba)
7	FW	IRQ	Ali Yousif (from (Iran) Sanat)
22	MF	LBN	Hasan Srour (from (Lebanon) Al-Ahed)
19	DF	MAR	Anouar Tarkhatt (from (Morocco) FAR Rabat)
1	GK	IRQ	Saif Kareem (from Al-Bahri)
15	DF	NED	Lassana Faye (from (Latvia) Liepāja)
—	MF	CMR	Clarence Bitang (from (Saudi Arabia) Hajer)

Out:

No.	Pos.	Nation	Player
4	MF	IRQ	Louai Al-Ani (to Al-Talaba)
6	DF	IRQ	Hussam Kadhim (to Al-Kahrabaa)
9	FW	IRQ	Alaa Abbas (to Al-Quwa Al-Jawiya)
10	MF	IRQ	Hasan Abdulkareem (to Al-Shorta)
13	FW	NGR	Christopher John (to (Qatar) Al-Mesaimeer)
15	DF	IRQ	El Hassan Houbeib (to (Morocco) FAR Rabat)
25	MF	IRQ	Mohammed Ali Abbood (to Zakho)
31	GK	IRQ	Mohsin Sami (to Al-)
34	DF	IRQ	Mustafa Maan (to Al-Najaf)
37	FW	GHA	Collins Opare (to (Lebanon) Al-Nejmeh)
—	DF	IRQ	Khudhur Ali (to Al-Kahrabaa)
—	MF	IRQ	Ahmed Jalal (to Naft Al-Basra)
—	DF	IRQ	Abbas Qasim (to Al-Karma)
—	DF	IRQ	Ali Kareem (to Al-Kahrabaa)
—	MF	NGR	Amos Dadet (to (North Macedonia) Voska)

=== Diyala ===
In:

No.	Pos.	Nation	Player
14	DF	CIV	Habib Omar Fofana (from Al-Minaa)
7	MF	IRQ	Al-Muntasser Bellah Fouad (from Al-Kahrabaa)
28	FW	IRQ	Ali Kareem (from Al-Hudood)
17	MF	IRQ	Hussein Ibrahim (from Karbala)
88	FW	NGR	Benjamin Okorokwo (from Naft Maysan)
99	FW	BRA	Mateus Toto (from (Bahrain) Al-Shabab)
—	FW	IRQ	Anas Malik (from Al-Karkh)
15	DF	MTN	Bakary N'Diaye (from Naft Al-Wasat)
10	MF	IRQ	Omar Abdul-Rahman (from Al-Najaf)
30	GK	IRQ	Wissam Mohammed (from Al-Hudood)
41	GK	IRQ	Ali Jassim (from Al-Qasim)
33	MF	CMR	Nathaniel Nangolo (from Al-Hudood)
—	DF	IRQ	Ahmed Khaled (from Duhok)
21	MF	IRQ	Abdulabbas Ayad (from Karbala)
5	MF	IRQ	Hussein Menthour (from Zakho)
23	DF	IRQ	Kosrat Baiz (from Al-Karma)
12	FW	COD	Ducapel Moloko (from (Libya) Al-Sadaqa)
4	DF	IRQ	Muntadher Sattar (from Al-Najaf)
16	DF	IRQ	Mashkor Kareem (from Naft Al-Wasat)
1	GK	IRQ	Hassan Abbas (from Karbala)
9	FW	IRQ	Zainulabdeen Salam (from Karbala)
25	MF	IRQ	Yassir Naeem (from Al-Hudood)
8	FW	IRQ	Ahmed Turky (from Naft Al-Wasat)

Out:

No.	Pos.	Nation	Player
21	MF	IRQ	Abdulabbas Ayad (to Karbala)
30	GK	IRQ	Noor Mohammed (to Masafi Al-Wasat)
—	FW	IRQ	Alaa Adnan (to Al-)
—	MF	TOG	Akaté Gnama (to Al-Fahad)
—	FW	SYR	Abdulhadi Shalha (to (Syria) Al-Wahda)
—	FW	SLE	Sheka Fofanah (to Al-)
—	FW	SYR	Hareth Al-Naif (to Al-)
—	MF	CIV	Sadia Bleu (to Al-)
—	DF	TOG	Waddadi Kerdid (to Al-Ramadi)
—	MF	IRQ	Yahya Ali (to Amanat Baghdad)

=== Duhok ===
In:

No.	Pos.	Nation	Player
2	DF	IRQ	Najm Shwan (from Al-Kahrabaa)
3	DF	IRQ	Masies Artien (from (Netherlands) Spakenburg)
7	FW	SWE	Peter Gwargis (from (Sweden) Malmo)
9	FW	GHA	Gilbert Koomson (from (Israel) Petah Tikva)
10	MF	IRQ	Haron Ahmed Zubair (from Dalkurd)
11	FW	IRQ	Pashang Abdulla (from (Sweden) Degerfors)
18	FW	IRQ	Dhulfiqar Younis (from Al-Shorta on loan)
19	FW	IRQ	Ameer Kinani (from (Canada) Vancouver)
25	MF	FRA	Zana Allée (from (France) Rouen)
40	DF	IRQ	Hedayat Lateef (from Peshmerga H)
77	FW	MAR	Charki El Bahri (from (Morocco) Wydad)
—	FW	IRQ	Arkan Mansour (from Akre)
—	MF	IRQ	Hassan Emad (from Al-Quwa Al-Jawiya youth)
—	DF	CIV	Wonlo Coulibaly (from (Ivory Coast) Mimosas)
—	MF	IRQ	Sumar Almadjed (from (Sweden) Helsingborg)

Out:

No.	Pos.	Nation	Player
4	MF	IRQ	Rewan Amin (to Al-Shorta)
6	DF	IRQ	Harem Tahseen (to Al-Nasiriya)
7	FW	IRQ	Ziar Govand Lateef (to Al-)
9	FW	IRQ	Ziad Ahmed (to Al-)
10	MF	IRQ	Waleed Salman (to Naft Al-Wasat)
11	MF	IRQ	Hiran Ahmed (to Al-Quwa Al-Jawiya)
19	FW	IRQ	Jabbar Kareem (to Amanat Baghdad)
22	GK	IRQ	Moussa Shukir (to Peshmerga S)
25	FW	NGR	Usman Sale (to Naft Maysan)
41	DF	IRQ	Mohammed Maan (to Al-)
42	DF	IRQ	Ahmed Khaled (to Diyala)
77	FW	TUN	Imed Louati (to (Kuwait) Al-Salmiya)
—	MF	IRQ	Abbas Majed (to Al-Bahri)
—	MF	IRQ	Sumar Almadjed (to Al-Minaa)

=== Erbil ===
In:

No.	Pos.	Nation	Player
—	DF	SYR	Khaled Kourdoghli (from (Syria) Al-Wehdat)
—	DF	IRQ	Niaz Mohammed (from Al-Talaba)
—	MF	IRQ	Ali Raheem (from (Jordan) Al-Ahli)
—	DF	IRQ	Yadger Ibrahim (from Said Sadeq)
—	FW	IRQ	Dana Kamiran (from Peshmerga H)
—	FW	IRQ	Halgurd Qais (from Peshmerga H)
—	GK	IRQ	Mahdi Hashim (from Naft Maysan)
—	GK	IRQ	Ammar Ali (from Al-Kahrabaa)
—	GK	IRQ	Dolvan Mahdi (from Karbala)
—	MF	IRQ	Osama Rashid (from (Portugal) Vizela)
—	DF	IRQ	Mahmoud Shakir (from Al-)
—	MF	IRQ	Safin Mansour (from Zakho)
—	FW	IRQ	Mohammed Salam (from Erbil youth)
—	MF	IRQ	Moayed Safaa (from Shirwana)
—	DF	TUN	Bilel Ifa (from (Kuwait) Al-Shabab)
—	FW	TUN	Youssef Ben Souda (from (Kuwait) Al-Shabab)
—	FW	JAM	Collin Anderson (from (North Macedonia) Bregalnica)
—	MF	BRA	Higor Vidal (from (South Africa) TS Galaxy)

Out:

No.	Pos.	Nation	Player
6	MF	IRQ	Ali Shakhwan (to Al-Quwa Al-Jawiya)
8	DF	IRQ	Akam Hashim (to Al-Shorta)
9	FW	SYR	Yassin Samia (to Al-)
10	FW	IRQ	Amjad Radhi (to Al-)
12	GK	IRQ	Alaa Khalil (to Naft Maysan)
18	FW	IRQ	Abdulqader Ayoub (to Al-Nasiriya)
24	FW	COL	Luis Hinestroza (to Al-)
25	MF	SEN	Khalifa Ababacar Sow (to Al-)
26	FW	IRQ	Mohammed Qasim (to Al-Quwa Al-Jawiya)
29	FW	IRQ	Barzan Sherhad Rashid (to Al-Nasiriya)
30	GK	IRQ	Laith Maan (to Al-Qasim)
31	DF	IRQ	Herdi Siamand (to Al-Nasiriya)
34	DF	IRQ	Ahmed Maknzi (to Al-Najaf)
55	MF	IRQ	Ali Mohsin (to Al-Hudood)
66	DF	IRQ	Yasser Salam (from Naft Al-Wasat)
88	MF	MLI	Adama Ballo (from Naft Al-Wasat)

=== Karbala ===
In:

No.	Pos.	Nation	Player
10	FW	IRQ	Mushtaq Talib (from Al-Quwa Al-Jawiya)
66	MF	IRQ	Abdullah Hassoon (from Al-Quwa Al-Jawiya)
71	MF	IRQ	Abdulabbas Ayad (from Diyala)
—	FW	LBR	William Jebor (from Al-Minaa)
—	MF	MLI	Makan Samabaly (from Al-Najaf)
—	MF	CIV	Ali Diakité (from (Malta) Birkirkara)
—	DF	BFA	Soumaïla Ouattara (from (Denmark) Hobro)
—	DF	IRQ	Mustafa Mohammed (from (Iran) Mes Rafsanjan)
—	MF	IRQ	Hassan Abbas (from Amanat Baghdad)
—	MF	IRQ	Dolvan Mahdi (from Al-Talaba)
—	MF	IRQ	Al-Hareth Hatam (from Al-Qasim)
—	MF	IRQ	Zainulabdeen Salam (from Zakho)
—	MF	IRQ	Assad Abdullah (from Al-Karma)
—	FW	IRQ	Dhulfiqar Younis (from Al-Shorta)

Out:

No.	Pos.	Nation	Player
5	DF	CMR	Joel Tchofo (to Al-Naft)
8	MF	IRQ	Sajjad Raad (to Al-Karma)
10	FW	IRQ	Mushtaq Talib (to Al-Quwa Al-Jawiya)
17	DF	IRQ	Sajjad Ahmed (to Maysan)
24	MF	IRQ	Mohammed Kareem (to Al-Jolan)
66	MF	IRQ	Abdullah Hassoon (to Al-Quwa Al-Jawiya)
71	MF	IRQ	Abdulabbas Ayad (to Diyala)
77	MF	BFA	Sami Hien (to Al-Naft)
88	FW	CAF	Karl Nanmganda (to (Bulgaria) Pirin)
90	DF	IRI	Aghil Kaabi (to (Iran) Palayesh Naft)
—	DF	IRQ	Mustafa Mohammed (to Naft Maysan)
—	MF	IRQ	Hassan Abbas (from Diyala)
—	MF	IRQ	Dolvan Mahdi (to Erbil)
—	MF	IRQ	Al-Hareth Hatam (to Al-Qasim)
—	MF	IRQ	Zainulabdeen Salam (to Diyala)
—	MF	IRQ	Assad Abdullah (to Al-Fahad)
—	FW	IRQ	Dhulfiqar Younis (to Duhok)

=== Naft Al-Basra ===
In:

No.	Pos.	Nation	Player
—	FW	IRQ	Mahmoud Ahmed (from Al-Hudood)
—	MF	IRQ	Ahmed Jalal (from Al-Zawraa)
—	MF	IRQ	Ali Al-Sajjad (from Al-Kahrabaa)
—	GK	IRQ	Ahmed Shakir (from Al-Qasim)
—	FW	IRQ	Alaa Mohaisen (from Al-Qasim)
—	GK	IRQ	Mujtaba Mohammed (from Newroz)
—	DF	IRQ	Mustafa Moayed (from Al-Talaba)
2	DF	TOG	Kangnivi Ama Tchoutchoui (from (Togo) Gbohloé)
15	DF	IRQ	Hussein Falah (from Naft Maysan)
18	MF	TOG	Toure Junior (from (Morocco) FAR Rabat)
24	MF	NGR	Joseph Onoja (from (Vietnam) Binh Duong)
28	FW	TOG	Ismaïl Ouro-Agoro (from (Morocco) FAR Rabat)
88	FW	IRQ	Ali Khalil (from Amanat Baghdad)

Out:

No.	Pos.	Nation	Player
7	FW	IRQ	Hussam Jadallah (to Al-Naft)
12	GK	IRQ	Hayder Jamal (to Al-Naft)
25	DF	IRQ	Mohammed Mustafa (to Al-Karkh)
31	DF	IRQ	Jaílson (to Al-Nasiriya)
32	DF	IRQ	Alaa Raed (to Zakho)
50	GK	IRQ	Kumel Al-Rekabe (to (Spain) Leganés)
70	FW	CMR	Ngombe Mbengue (to Al-Gharraf)
73	FW	GHA	Benjamin Agyare (to Al-Bahri)
82	MF	GHA	Kwame Bonsu (to (Saudi Arabia) Al-Ain)
90	FW	IRQ	Ahmed Zamel (to Zakho)
—	DF	GHA	Lamine Moro (to (Oman) Dhofar)
—	MF	IRQ	Hussaini Abdulrazzaq (to Al-)
—	MF	IRQ	Muayed Abdul Baset (to Ghaz Al-Shamal)
—	DF	YEM	Mohammed Al-Ghaili (to Maysan)
—	MF	IRQ	Ali Shawqi (to Al-Bahri)

=== Naft Maysan ===
In:

No.	Pos.	Nation	Player
—	DF	IRQ	Mohammed Salam (from Al-Kahrabaa)
—	DF	IRQ	Hussein Falah (from Al-Najaf)
—	MF	IRQ	Murtadha Kassad (from Al-Qasim)
—	DF	IRQ	Mohannad Habib (from Al-Bahri)
—	GK	IRQ	Alaa Khalil (from Erbil)
—	FW	YEM	Ahmed Maher (from (Oman) Al-Wahda)
—	DF	IRQ	Mustafa Hadi (from Al-Sinaat Al-Kahrabaiya)
—	FW	NGR	Okiki Afolabi (from Al-Naft)
—	MF	NGR	Dare Olatunji (from Al-Minaa)
—	FW	SEN	Daouda Diémé (from Al-Kahrabaa)
—	DF	CIV	Alexandre Yeoulé (from Al-Hudood)
—	FW	NGR	Usman Sale (from Duhok)
—	MF	SYR	Ali Kute (from (Syria) Tishreen)
—	DF	IRQ	Mustafa Mohammed (from Karbala)

Out:

No.	Pos.	Nation	Player
3	DF	IRQ	Sajjad Mahdi (to Al-Zawraa)
6	DF	IRQ	Jaafer Gatea (to Maysan)
9	FW	SYR	Alaa Al Dali (to (Iran) Chadormalu)
12	GK	IRQ	Mahdi Hashim (to Erbil)
13	FW	IRQ	Hayder Abdulraheem (to Al-Qasim)
16	MF	IRQ	Hussein Kadhim (to Naft Al-Wasat)
20	DF	IRQ	Hussein Amer (to Al-Minaa)
28	MF	BFA	Maarouf Youssef (to Al-Nasiriya)
29	MF	CMR	Regis Baha (to Al-)
35	FW	NGR	Kingsley Fidelis Kuku (to Al-Gharraf)
41	GK	IRQ	Amjad Rahim (to Al-Kahrabaa)
44	DF	YEM	Rami Al-Wasmani (released)
88	FW	NGR	Benjamin Okoronkwo (to Diyala)
—	DF	IRQ	Hussein Falah (to Naft Al-Basra)

=== Newroz ===
In:

No.	Pos.	Nation	Player
28	GK	IRQ	Emad Eissa (from Zakho)
66	DF	IRQ	Hangaw Mohammed (from Zakho)
6	MF	IRQ	Ibrahim Mohammed (from Peshmerga S)
7	MF	IRQ	Hawkar Jamal (from Peshmerga S)
70	FW	IRQ	Mohammed Taqi (from Peshmerga S)
25	GK	IRQ	Hani Shaker (from Naft Al-Wasat)
81	FW	CIV	Inters Gui (from (Oman) Al-Nahda)
—	MF	BRA	Gilmar (from (United Arab Emirates) Dibba Al-Hisn)
77	DF	CMR	Daniel Kamy (from (Bulgaria) Lokomotiv)
17	FW	IRQ	Mueen Ahmed (from Al-Najaf)
53	DF	IRQ	Taqi Falah (from Amanat Baghdad)
4	DF	IRQ	Alai Ghasem (from (Sweden) Eskilstuna)
33	DF	IRQ	Abbas Mohamad (from (Thailand) Ratchasima)
9	FW	IRQ	Aso Rostam (from Al-Shorta)
18	FW	IRQ	Ayad Abed Farhan (from Al-Minaa)
5	DF	IRQ	Shwana Mahmoud (from Peshmerga S)

Out:

No.	Pos.	Nation	Player
4	DF	GAM	Lamin Samateh (to (Bahrain) Al-Najma)
7	FW	IRQ	Shirwan Kurdistan (to Al-Hudood)
10	MF	IRQ	Mohammed Sami (to Al-Quwa Al-Jawiya)
13	MF	IRQ	Ahmed Salam (to Masafi Al-Wasat)
15	DF	IRQ	Ammar Abdul-Hussein (from Al-)
18	MF	IRQ	Murtadha Hedaib (to Al-Kahrabaa)
21	GK	IRQ	Ahmed Hameed (to Maysan)
22	GK	IRQ	Mujtaba Mohammed (to Naft Al-Basra)
24	FW	IRQ	Moussa Adnan (to Naft Al-Wasat)
25	MF	IRQ	Sattar Yassin (to Al-Naft)
28	FW	GHA	Stephen Baffour (to Al-Fahad)
31	GK	IRQ	Mohammed Raheem (to Al-Quwa Al-Jawiya)
35	DF	IRQ	Ahmed Khalid (to Al-Naft)
49	FW	NGR	Ibrahim Tomiwa (to (Saudi Arabia) Al-Batin)

=== Zakho ===
In:

No.	Pos.	Nation	Player
11	MF	IRQ	Humam Tariq (from Al-Quwa Al-Jawiya)
25	MF	IRQ	Mohammed Ali Abbood (from Al-Zawraa)
—	GK	IRQ	Hassan Ahmed (from Al-Talaba)
—	DF	IRQ	Alaa Raed (from Naft Al-Basra)
—	FW	IRQ	Ahmed Zamel (from Naft Al-Basra)
—	GK	IRQ	Ali Abdul-Kareem (from Ghaz Al-Shamal)
—	DF	JOR	Mohammad Abu Hashish (from Naft Al-Wasat)
—	FW	SYR	Mahmoud Al-Aswad (from (Syria) Al-Karamah)
—	FW	BRA	Gustavo Henrique (from (Brazil) América-RN)
—	FW	MAR	Ayoub Nanah (from (Morocco) Rabat)
—	FW	SYR	Ibrahim Hesar (from (Iran) Foolad)

Out:

No.	Pos.	Nation	Player
10	MF	BRA	Dion Ribas (to (Brazil) Redonda)
11	FW	IRQ	Ahmed Sartip (from Al-Qasim)
11	MF	IRQ	Humam Tariq (to Al-Talaba)
13	DF	ZAM	Rodrick Kabwe (to Al-)
15	MF	IRQ	Hussein Menthour (to Diyala)
26	FW	COL	Darwin López (to (Ecuador) Macará)
27	FW	IRQ	Zainulabdeen Salam (to Karbala)
28	GK	IRQ	Emad Eissa (to Newroz)
44	MF	IRQ	Safin Mansour (to Erbil)
66	DF	IRQ	Hangaw Mohammed (to Newroz)
99	FW	CMR	Frank Cédric Abogo (to Al-Karma)

== Iraqi Premier Division League ==
=== Afak ===
In:

No.	Pos.	Nation	Player

Out:

No.	Pos.	Nation	Player

=== Al-Bahri ===
In:

No.	Pos.	Nation	Player
—	MF	GHA	Abdul Latif Anabila (from Al-Ramadi)
—	MF	GHA	Kofi Yeboah (from Al-Jolan)
—	MF	IRQ	Abbas Majed (from Duhok)
—	MF	IRQ	Ali Shawqi (from Naft Al-Basra)
—	DF	IRQ	Hassan Odah (from Al-Minaa)
—	DF	IRQ	Karrar Al-Amir Ali (from Al-Minaa)
—	FW	IRQ	Hatim Aysar (from Al-Minaa)

Out:

No.	Pos.	Nation	Player
—	DF	IRQ	Mohannad Habib (to Naft Maysan)
—	GK	IRQ	Saif Kareem (from Al-Zawraa)

=== Al-Etisalat ===
In:

No.	Pos.	Nation	Player
—	MF	NGR	George Ejeh (from (Lebanon) Ahly Nabatieh)
—	MF	CIV	Yao David (from Al-Nasiriya)

Out:

No.	Pos.	Nation	Player
9	FW	IRQ	Karrar Hameed (to Maysan)

=== Al-Fahad ===
In:

No.	Pos.	Nation	Player
—	MF	CIV	Florent Didier Koré (from Amanat Baghdad)
—	MF	TOG	Akaté Gnama (from Diyala)
—	DF	TOG	Wilson Akakpo (from Al-Karkh)
—	FW	GHA	Stephen Baffour (from Newroz)
—	MF	CMR	Didier Talla (from Al-Karkh)
—	MF	GHA	Baba Mahama (from Al-Sinaat Al-Kahrabaiya)
—	DF	IRQ	Mustafa Irmayyidh (from Al-Karkh)
—	FW	IRQ	Assad Abdullah (from Karbala)

Out:

No.	Pos.	Nation	Player

=== Al-Gharraf ===
In:

No.	Pos.	Nation	Player
—	DF	IRQ	Muntadher Abdulsada (from (Saudi Arabia) Arar)
—	FW	NGR	Kingsley Fidelis Kuku (from Naft Maysan)
—	MF	BFA	Lem Ismael Souleymane (from Amanat Baghdad)
—	FW	CMR	Ngombe Mbengue (from Naft Al-Basra)
—	DF	IRQ	Murtadha Raees (from Al-Nasiriya)

Out:

No.	Pos.	Nation	Player

=== Al-Hussein ===
In:

No.	Pos.	Nation	Player

Out:

No.	Pos.	Nation	Player

=== Al-Kadhimiya ===
In:

No.	Pos.	Nation	Player
—	MF	LBN	Youssef Atriss (from (Lebanon) Shabab Al-Ghazieh)

Out:

No.	Pos.	Nation	Player

=== Al-Jolan ===
In:

No.	Pos.	Nation	Player
41	DF	BRA	Bruno Oliveira (from Al-Karma)
4	DF	BRA	Enck (from Al-Karma)
—	MF	IRQ	Majed Lafta (from Al-Sinaa)
—	FW	IRQ	Ahmed Abdul-Razzak (from Al-Karkh)
—	MF	IRQ	Ibrahim Naeem (from Al-Karma)
—	FW	GHA	Dennis Tetteh (from Al-Kahrabaa)
—	FW	GHA	Shafiu Mumuni (from Al-Kahrabaa)
—	GK	IRQ	Abdullah Faisal (from Al-Kahrabaa)
—	MF	IRQ	Mohammed Kareem (from Karbala)

Out:

No.	Pos.	Nation	Player
15	MF	GHA	Kofi Yeboah (to Al-Bahri)
18	MF	IRQ	Mohammed Haitham (to Al-Kahrabaa)

=== Al-Mosul ===
In:

No.	Pos.	Nation	Player
—	FW	YEM	Gehad Abdulrab (from Al-Karma)
—	DF	CIV	Abdoul Aziz Siahoune (from Al-Qasim)

Out:

No.	Pos.	Nation	Player

=== Al-Nasiriya ===
In:

No.	Pos.	Nation	Player
—	DF	RWA	Prince Buregeya (from (Rwanda) APR)
—	MF	BRA	Dioguinho (from Al-Karma)
—	DF	BRA	Jaílson (from Naft Al-Basra)
—	MF	BFA	Maarouf Youssef (from Naft Maysan)
—	FW	IRQ	Abdulqader Ayoub (from Erbil)
—	FW	IRQ	Barzan Sherhad Rashid (from Erbil)
—	DF	IRQ	Herdi Siamand (from Erbil)
—	DF	IRQ	Harem Tahseen (from Duhok)

Out:

No.	Pos.	Nation	Player
66	DF	IRQ	Murtadha Raees (to Al-Gharraf)
—	MF	IRQ	Abbas Fawzi (to Amanat Baghdad)

=== Al-Ramadi ===
In:

No.	Pos.	Nation	Player
—	DF	BRA	Lucao (from Al-Sinaa)
—	FW	GHA	Stephen Sarfo (from Peshmerga S)
—	MF	IRQ	Saif Khalid (from Al-Sinaa)
—	FW	IRQ	Manar Taha (from Masafi Al-Junoob)

Out:

No.	Pos.	Nation	Player
43	MF	GHA	Abdul Latif Anabila (to Al-Bahri)
55	MF	IRQ	Manuel Nana (to (Moldova) Petrocub)
66	MF	IRQ	Aws Firas (to Al-Naft)

=== Al-Sinaa ===
In:

No.	Pos.	Nation	Player
—	DF	IRQ	Mohammed Abdul-Zahra (from Al-Najaf)

Out:

No.	Pos.	Nation	Player
4	DF	BRA	Lucao (to Al-Ramadi)
5	MF	IRQ	Saif Khalid (to Al-Ramadi)
30	MF	IRQ	Majed Lafta (to Al-Jolan)

=== Al-Sinaat Al-Kahrabaiya ===
In:

No.	Pos.	Nation	Player
—	DF	IRQ	Abbas Manea (from Al-Karma)
—	MF	IRQ	Ameer Mohammed (from Al-Qasim)
—	FW	IRQ	Abboud Rabah (from Al-Qasim)
—	DF	IRQ	Muntadher Hassan (from Al-Minaa)

Out:

No.	Pos.	Nation	Player
8	MF	GHA	Baba Mahama (to Al-Fahad)

=== Amanat Baghdad ===
In:

No.	Pos.	Nation	Player
—	FW	LBN	Mohamad Kdouh (from (Lebanon) Al-Safa)
—	MF	IRQ	Shaaban Mahmoud (from Peshmerga S)
—	MF	IRQ	Abbas Fawzi (from Al-Nasiriya)
—	DF	IRQ	Hamza Abdul-Hussein (from Al-Hudood)
—	FW	IRQ	Jabbar Kareem (from Duhok)
—	MF	IRQ	Yahya Ali (from Diyala)

Out:

No.	Pos.	Nation	Player
1	GK	IRQ	Hassan Abbas (to Karbala)
6	MF	IRQ	Jassim Mohammed (to Al-Karkh)
16	GK	IRQ	Abdulsalem Hammad (to Al-Minaa)
35	MF	BFA	Lem Ismael Souleymane (to Al-Gharraf)
70	MF	CIV	Florent Didier Koré (to Al-Fahad)
77	MF	IRQ	Hussein Zeyad (to Al-Karkh)
80	FW	IRQ	Ridha Fadhil (to Al-Quwa Al-Jawiya)
88	FW	IRQ	Ali Khalil (to Naft Al-Basra)
—	FW	NGR	Oladayo Alabi (to Al-)

=== Ghaz Al-Shamal ===
In:

No.	Pos.	Nation	Player
—	MF	IRQ	Muayed Abdul Baset (from Naft Al-Basra)

Out:

No.	Pos.	Nation	Player
—	GK	IRQ	Ali Abdul-Kareem (to Zakho)

=== Masafi Al-Junoob ===
In:

No.	Pos.	Nation	Player
—	FW	NGR	Shadrach Chidubem (from (Syria) Al-Ahli)
—	GK	IRQ	Mohammed Saadoun (from Al-Minaa)

Out:

No.	Pos.	Nation	Player
24	MF	IRQ	Abdullah Wasfi (to Maysan)
—	DF	CIV	Ibrahim Koné (to Masafi Al-Wasat)

=== Masafi Al-Wasat ===
In:

No.	Pos.	Nation	Player
—	DF	RWA	Faustin Usengimana (Free agent)
—	MF	SYR	Kamel Hmeisheh (from (Syria) Tishreen)
—	DF	CIV	Ibrahim Koné (from Masafi Al-Junoob)
—	MF	IRQ	Yousif Ayad (from Al-Qasim)
—	MF	IRQ	Ahmed Salam (from Newroz)
—	MF	IRQ	Ali Karim (from Al-)
—	DF	IRQ	Maytham Ismail (from Al-)
—	GK	IRQ	Noor Mohammed (from Diyala)
—	FW	IRQ	Aba-Thar Abdulsada (from Al-Karkh)
—	DF	IRQ	Bilal Khudhair (from Naft Al-Wasat)
—	MF	IRQ	Mohammed Jumaa (from Al-Hudood)
—	FW	IRQ	Mustafa Al-Ameen (from Al-Kahrabaa)

Out:

No.	Pos.	Nation	Player
19	DF	NGR	Malomo Sunday (to Al-Shirqat)
25	MF	IRQ	Ahmed Adel (to Maysan)

=== Maysan ===
In:

No.	Pos.	Nation	Player
—	FW	GHA	Kalo Ouattara (from (Ghana) Asante Kotoko)
—	FW	GUI	Sékou Camara (from (France) Al-)
—	DF	GUI	Lancibet Sidibe (from (Albania) Flamurtari)
—	DF	BFA	Souleymane Sakande (from (Saudi Arabia) Al-Qaisumah)
—	GK	IRQ	Ahmed Hameed (from Newroz)
—	DF	IRQ	Sajjad Ahmed (from Karbala)
—	MF	IRQ	Ahmed Adel (from Masafi Al-Wasat)
—	FW	IRQ	Karrar Hameed (from Al-Etisalat)
—	MF	IRQ	Abdullah Wasfi (from Masafi Al-Junoob)
—	DF	IRQ	Jaafer Gatea (from Naft Maysan)
—	DF	IRQ	Haider Majed (from Al-Qasim)

Out:

No.	Pos.	Nation	Player
—	MF	IRQ	Mohammed Hasan (from Al-)
—	MF	IRQ	Abdul-Muhaimen Jabbar (from Al-)

=== Naft Al-Wasat ===
In:

No.	Pos.	Nation	Player
—	MF	MLI	Adama Ballo (from Erbil)
—	MF	RWA	Djabel Manishimwe (from Al-Quwa Al-Jawiya)
—	DF	IRQ	Karrar Noor (from Al-Qasim)
—	FW	IRQ	Moussa Adnan (from Newroz)
—	DF	IRQ	Yasser Salam (from Erbil)
—	MF	IRQ	Ahmed Mohammed (Free agent)
—	MF	IRQ	Waleed Salman (from Duhok)
—	MF	IRQ	Taher Hameed (from Al-Najaf)

Out:

No.	Pos.	Nation	Player
1	GK	IRQ	Ali Kadhem (to Al-Najaf)
4	DF	IRQ	Bilal Khudhair (to Masafi Al-Wasat)
6	MF	IRQ	Ali Qasim (to Al-Karkh)
10	MF	IRQ	Ali Majid (to Al-Naft)
16	DF	IRQ	Mashkor Kareem (to Diyala)
21	DF	IRQ	Abdullah Khalaf (to Al-Karma)
25	GK	IRQ	Hani Shaker (to Newroz)
26	MF	IRQ	Ahmed Abdul-Hussein (to Al-Najaf)
44	DF	MTN	Bakary N'Diaye (to Diyala)
71	FW	IRQ	Hussein Abdul-Wahid (to Al-Qasim)
91	FW	IRQ	Ahmed Turky (to Diyala)
—	DF	JOR	Mohammad Abu Hashish (to Zakho)

=== Peshmerga Sulaymaniya ===
In:

No.	Pos.	Nation	Player
—	GK	IRQ	Moussa Shukir (from Duhok)

Out:

No.	Pos.	Nation	Player
—	MF	IRQ	Ibrahim Mohammed (to Newroz)
—	MF	IRQ	Hawkar Jamal (to Newroz)
—	FW	IRQ	Mohammed Taqi (to Newroz)
—	FW	GHA	Stephen Sarfo (to Al-Ramadi)
—	MF	IRQ	Shaaban Mahmoud (to Amanat Baghdad)

== Iraqi transfers abroad ==
The following list contains transfers of Iraqi players abroad, in alphabetical order.

No.	Pos.	Nation	Player
—	DF	IRQ	Ali Adnan (from (Iran) Mes Rafsanjan to (Saudi Arabia) Al-Najma)
—	MF	IRQ	Amir Al-Ammari (from (Sweden) Halmstad to (Poland) Cracovia)
—	DF	IRQ	Ameen Al-Dakhil (from (England) Burnley to (Germany) Stuttgart)
—	FW	IRQ	Ali Almosawe (from (Portugal) Amadora to (Denmark) Hillerød)
—	FW	IRQ	Danilo Al-Saed (from (Norway) Sandefjord to (Netherlands) Heerenveen)
—	FW	IRQ	André Alsanati (from (Sweden) Sirius to (Finland) Oulu on loan)
—	FW	IRQ	Arian Amyn (from (Germany) Viktoria Köln to (Germany) Alemannia Aachen)
—	FW	IRQ	Youssef Amyn (from (Germany) Braunschweig to (Saudi Arabia) Al-Wehda)
—	MF	IRQ	Rayan Demirci (from (Sweden) Västerås to (Portugal) Porto)
—	DF	IRQ	Roman Doulashi (from (Germany) Schalke to (Netherlands) Roda)

No.	Pos.	Nation	Player
—	DF	IRQ	Martin Haddad (Unattached to (Sweden) Huddinge)
—	DF	IRQ	Mohanad Jeahze (from (United States) D.C. United to (Norway) Lillestrom)
—	MF	IRQ	Muntadher Mohammed (from (Iran) Esteghlal to (Iran) Nassaji)
—	FW	IRQ	Amar Muhsin (from (Sweden) Helsingborg to (Sweden) Brage on loan)
—	DF	IRQ	Adam Rasheed (from (Italy) Torino to (Slovenia) Maribor)
—	DF	IRQ	Mustafa Saleh (from (Sweden) Ljungskile to (Sweden) Örebro Syrianska)
—	DF	IRQ	Cardo Siddik (from (England) Darlington to (England) Oxford City)
—	DF	IRQ	Rebin Sulaka (from (South Korea) Seoul to (Switzerland) Schaffhausen)
—	MF	IRQ	Ahmed Yasin (from (Saudi Arabia) Al-Kholood to (Sweden) Örebro)

== See also ==
- 2024–25 Iraq Stars League
- 2024–25 Iraqi Premier Division League
