= Ahmed Yasser =

Ahmed Yasser may refer to:

- Ahmed Yasser (footballer, born 1994), Qatari footballer
- Ahmed Yasser (footballer, born 1991), Egyptian footballer
