= Fernando Cardozo =

Fernando Cardozo or Cardoso may refer to:

- Fernando Henrique Cardoso (born 1931), Brazilian sociologist and politician
- Fernando Cardozo (footballer, born 1979), Brazilian football defender
- Fernando Cardoso (footballer) (born 1990), Brazilian football defensive midfielder
- Fernando Cardozo (footballer, born 2001), Paraguayan football forward
- Fernando Daniel Cardozo Brandon, Uruguayan footballer in 2007–08 Honduran Liga Nacional
- Fernando Cardoso (sport shooter), participated in Shooting at the 2007 Pan American Games
- Isaac Cardoso (born 1603 or 1604; died 1683), Jewish physician, philosopher, and polemic writer
