= Handren SC =

Iraqi football club

- Full name: Handren Sport Club
- Founded: 2003; 23 years ago
- Ground: Handren Stadium
- Chairman: Hakem Jamal Jalal
- Manager: Delshad Maarouf
- League: Iraqi Third Division League
| Home colours | Away colours |

Handren Sport Club (Arabic: نادي هندرين الرياضي) is an Iraqi football team based in Erbil, that plays in Iraqi Third Division League and Kurdistan Premier League.

== Managerial history ==
- (Iraq) Delshad Maarouf

== Honours ==
=== Domestic ===
- Kurdistan Premier League
  - Winners (1): 2010–11
