= Kurdistan Premier League =

- Founded: 2006
- Confederation: ConIFA
- Number of clubs: 15
- Level on pyramid: 1
- Relegation to: Kurdistan First League
- Current champions: Sherwana SC (1st title) (2024–25)
- Most championships: Zeravani SC (4 titles)
- Website: https://www.kfa.krd/ckb

The Kurdistan Premier League (Kurdish: خولی نایابی کوردستان, romanized: Xûlî Nayabî Kurdistan) is the foremost association football league in the Kurdistan Region of Iraq. It is overseen by the Kurdistan Football Association. The league is not officially recognized by FIFA or any of its confederations, therefore cannot compete in their continental or intercontinental competitions.

== Organisation ==
The Kurdistan Premier League sits above the Kurdistan First Division (Kurdish: خولی پلە یەکی کوردستان, romanized: Xûlî pile yekî Kurdistan) and Kurdish Second Division (Kurdish خولی پلە دووی کوردستان, romanized: Xûlî pîle dûy Kurdistan). The season mainly runs from August and finishes in May, with clubs playing 28 matches each. Regional cup and supercup are also part of the overall season.

== Current members ==
- Akre SC
- Brayati SC
- Chwarqurna SC
- Darbandikhan SC
- Duhok SC
- Erbil SC
- Handren SC
- New Sirwan SC
- Pishasazi SC
- Ranya SC
- Rzgari SC
- Said Sadeq SC
- Shaqlawa SC
- Sherwana SC
- Zakho SC

== Champions ==
Season	Club
2006–07	Duhok SC
2007–08	Brusk SC
2008–09	Brusk SC
2009–10	Erbil SC
2010–11	Handren SC
2011–12	Erbil SC
2012–13	Zeravani SC
2013–14	Zeravani SC
2014–15	Zeravani SC
2015–16	Erbil SC
2016–17	Peshmerga Hawler SC
2017–18	Zeravani SC
2018–19	Peshmerga Hawler SC
2019–20	Abandoned
2020–21	Brayati SC
2021–22	New Sirwan SC
2022–23	Peshmerga Hawler SC
2023–24	Akre SC
2024–25	Sherwana SC

Club	Titles
Zeravani SC	4
Peshmerga Hawler SC	3
Erbil SC	3
Brusk SC	2
Sherwana SC	1
Akre SC	1
New Sirwan SC	1
Brayati SC	1
Handren SC	1
Duhok SC	1
