= Abdul Latif Anabila =

Ghanaian footballer (born 1997)

Personal information
- Date of birth: 15 April 1997 (age 29)
- Place of birth: Tema, Ghana
- Height: 1.82 m (6 ft 0 in)
- Position: Midfielder

Senior career*
Years	Team	Apps	(Gls)
2015–2016	New Edubiase United		
2017–2018	Club Africain	4	(0)
2018–2019	Ashanti Gold	29	(1)
2020–2021	Asante Kotoko	18	(0)
2021–2023	Bechem United	41	(0)

International career^{‡}
2015	Ghana U23	1	(0)
2019	Ghana A'	1	(0)
- * Club domestic league appearances and goals as of 4 June 2023 ‡ National team caps and goals as of 20 October 2019

Abdul Latif Anabila (born 15 April 1997) is a Ghanaian footballer who plays as a midfielder.

== Personal life ==
Anabila is Muslim.
