= Rewan Amin =

Iraqi footballer (born 1996)

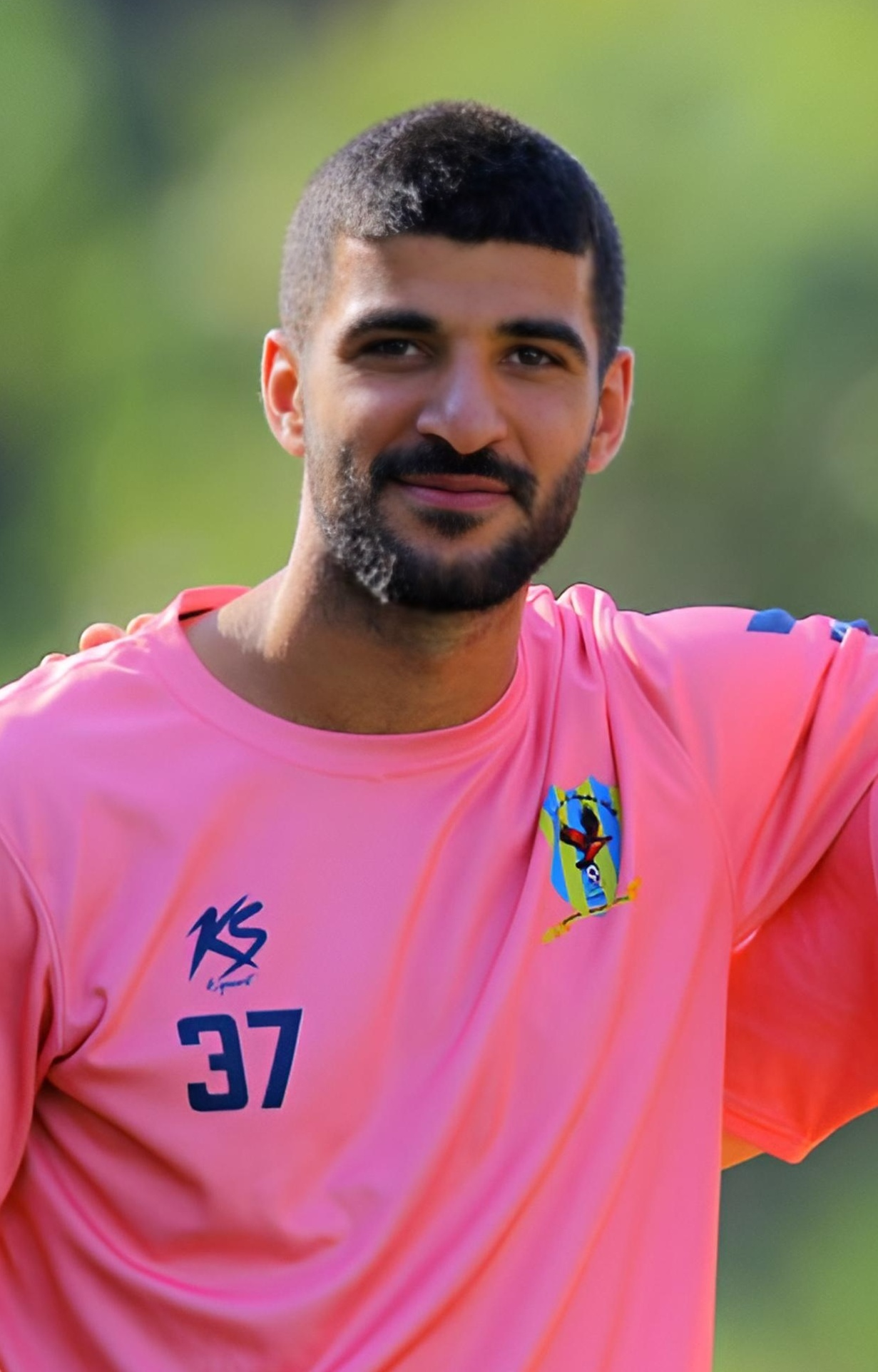
- Amin in 2023

Personal information
- Full name: Rewan Amin
- Date of birth: 8 January 1996 (age 30)
- Place of birth: Sumel, Duhok, Iraq
- Height: 1.79 m (5 ft 10 in)
- Position: Defensive midfielder

Team information
- Current team: Duhok

Youth career
- 2002–2008: LAC Frisia 1883
- 2008–2015: Heerenveen

Senior career*
Years	Team	Apps	(Gls)
2015–2017	Heerenveen	0	(0)
2017–2018	Dalkurd	44	(0)
2018–2021	Östersund	50	(1)
2022	Dalkurd	10	(1)
2023–2024	Duhok		
2024–2026	Al-Shorta	39	(2)
2026–	Duhok		

International career
2012–2013	Netherlands U17	10	(1)
2022–	Iraq	4	(0)
2022	Iraq XI	1	(0)
- * Club domestic league appearances and goals as of 30 June 2026

Rewan Amin (Arabic: ريوان أمين, Kurdish: ڕێوان ئەمین, Rêwan Emîn; born 8 January 1996) is an Iraqi Kurdish professional footballer who plays as a defensive midfielder for Duhok and the Iraq national team.

== Club career ==
Born in Dohuk, Iraq, Amin and his family migrated to the Dutch city of Leeuwarden when he was three. Three years later, he joined the youth setup of LAC Frisia 1883, before switching to the academy of Heerenveen six years later. In 2013, he signed a three-year contract extension with the club. In March 2013, reports emerged of English club Arsenal expressing their desire to sign him.

In the pre-season of 2014–15, Amin injured his right knee. In the first match after his recovery, Amin was again injured against FC Groningen. Even though he recovered after the winter break, Amin was again injured, this time in a workout which ruled him out of play for eight weeks. On 12 May 2016, his contract was extended for another season.

Although Amin played 32 times for the reserves, he failed to make a first team debut at Heerenveen. On 2 February 2017, he moved to Swedish second-tier club Dalkurd FF, after agreeing to a three-year contract. The same season, Dalkurd won a promotion to Allsvenskan, Sweden's top tier.

On 11 August 2018, Rewan Amin transferred to fellow Allsvenskan side Östersunds FK for an undisclosed fee, on a contract running until 2021. In total, Amin played 49 competitive games for Dalkurd, providing eight assists.

In January 2022, Amin terminated his contract with Ostersunds after a spell dictated by injuries and moved back to Dalkurd FF, only returning to playing in September 2022. He left Dalkurd at the end of the 2022 Superettan season, and a move to SC Cambuur in the Eredivise was arranged, but Amin preferred to play for his country against his new club's will so the move broke down. After winning the 25th Arabian Gulf Cup, Amin signed for Duhok SC, based in the city where he was born. He now captains the Duhok-based club.

== International career ==
Amin scored a goal in his debut for the Netherlands under-15 team. In 2012, he was called to the Netherlands under-17 by Albert Stuivenberg. He was appointed as the captain and went on to play 10 matches for the team.

On 12 September 2022, Amin was called up by Radhi Shenaishil to represent Iraq in the 2022 Jordan International Tournament, representing his country of birth. He was named on the bench in the semi-final against Oman. He came on in the last minute against Syria. Jesús Casas named Amin in the final squad for the 25th Arabian Gulf Cup, being a part of the squad that won the tournament for the fourth time in Iraq's history.

== Career statistics ==
As of match played on 2 November 2019

Club	Season	League			Cup		Other		Total	
Club	Season	Division	Apps	Goals	Apps	Goals	Apps	Goals	Apps	Goals
Heerenveen	2015–16	Eredivisie	0	0	0	0	—		0	0
Heerenveen	2016–17	Eredivisie	0	0	0	0	—		0	0
Heerenveen	Total		0	0	0	0	—		0	0
Dalkurd	2017	Superettan	29	0	2	0	—		31	0
Dalkurd	2018	Allsvenskan	15	0	3	0	—		18	0
Dalkurd	Total		44	0	5	0	—		49	0
Östersund	2018	Allsvenskan	12	0	0	0	—		12	0
Östersund	2019	Allsvenskan	23	0	4	0	—		27	0
Östersund	2020	Allsvenskan	15	1	3	0	—		18	1
Östersund	Total		50	1	7	0	—		57	1
Career total			94	1	12	0	0	0	106	1

== Honours ==
Al-Shorta

- Iraq Stars League: 2024–25

Iraq

- Arabian Gulf Cup: 2023
