= Yahaya Adamu =

Nigerian footballer (born 1993)

Personal information
- Full name: Yahaya Adamu
- Date of birth: 17 July 1993 (age 33)
- Place of birth: Damboa, Nigeria
- Height: 1.76 m (5 ft 9 in)
- Position: Striker

Senior career*
Years	Team	Apps	(Gls)
2012	Rising Stars F.C.		(7)
2013	Kwara United F.C.		
2014	QNK Quảng Nam F.C.	11	(5)
2015–2016	Baghdad FC		(4)
2016–	Naft Al-Janoob SC		
- * Club domestic league appearances and goals

Yahaya Adamu (born 17 July 1993) is a Nigerian footballer. He was born in Kaduna, and currently plays for Naft Al-Janoob SC, which competes in the Iraqi Premier League, the top division in Iraq. He plays as a striker for Naft Al-Janoob SC.

== Honours ==
COMPETITIONS PLAYED AND HONOURS 1. National under 15 Ramat cup 2007: gold medalist. 2. All Nigeria command games 2008(football) gold medal. (Most valuable player) 3. National under 16 football tournament (Kontagora 2008) highest goal scorer {6 goals}. 4. All Nigeria colleges of health games (Makarfi 2009) highest goal scorer (8 goals). 5. Youth sports federation of Nigeria (Ysfon) Adegbile cup 2009. (Silver medalist/highest goal scorer with 7goals). 6. Kaduna league 2010: highest goal scorer with 16 goals. 7. Senate president competition (Otukpo 2011): highest goal scorer 7 goals National under 20 team invitee 2010 under coach John Obuh. Currently with the National under 20 football team Matches played 1. Tanzania vs Nigeria in Dar salaam 2. Nigeria vs Tanzania in Ilorin – Nigeria 3. Rwanda vs Nigeria in Kigali 4. Benin vs Nigeria in Cotonou 5. South Africa vs Nigeria in Nilsprin 6. Nigeria vs South Africa in Ilorin 7. Nigeria vs Benin in Abuja. 8. Egypt vs Nigeria in Cairo
