= Ammar Ghalib =

Iraqi footballer (born 2001)

Personal information
- Full name: Ammar Ghalib
- Date of birth: 13 March 2001 (age 25)
- Place of birth: Amarah, Iraq
- Position: Winger

Team information
- Current team: Al-Naft (on loan from Al-Shorta)
- Number: 8

Youth career
- –2018: Al-Zawraa
- 2018–2020: Al-Shorta

Senior career*
Years	Team	Apps	(Gls)
2020–	Al-Shorta	29	(3)
2023–	→ Al-Naft (loan)	34	(1)

International career^{‡}
2021–2023	Iraq U-23		
- * Club domestic league appearances and goals as of 18/12/24 @ 08:35(AEST) ‡ National team caps and goals as of 1 August 2024

Ammar Ghalib (Arabic: عَمَّار غَالِب) is an Iraqi professional footballer who plays as a winger for Iraq Stars League club Al-Naft, on loan from Al-Shorta.

== Club career ==
Ghalib was promoted to Al-Shorta's first team in the summer of 2020 having come through the youth ranks at the club. He made his debut for the club in November 2020 against Al-Khalis in the Iraq FA Cup, coming off the bench in a 5–0 win. In January 2021, Ammar made his league debut for the club, coming on against Al-Hudood in the Iraqi Premier League. He would play in his first Baghdad Derby in June 2021 in a loss against Al-Zawraa. In June 2023 Ammar scored in Al-Shorta's 5–0 win away at Al-Najaf which helped them keep their spot at the top of the table. The defending champions would win the league for a second season in a row in July, giving the young forward the second Iraqi Premier League medal of his career. The following week he was part of the Al-Shorta squad that travelled to Saudi Arabia for the 2023 Arab Club Champions Cup where they would reach the semi-final, being the only club in the final four from outside the Saudi Pro League.

In September 2023, Al-Naft signed the young forward on loan for the upcoming season. In March 2024, Ghalib scored for Al-Naft in an important 3–2 victory over Al-Qasim in the Iraq Stars League.

== International career ==
Ammar received his first call up to the Iraq U-23 national team in August 2021 in a friendly defeat against Libya during the team's training camp in Turkey. He kept his place in the squad in September 2021 for two friendlies against UAE U-23 in Fujairah. In October, Ghalib was called up to the U-23 national team again for the 2021 WAFF U-23 Championship in Saudi Arabia, which Iraq would reach the semi-finals of. He would remain in the squad for the 2022 AFC U-23 Asian Cup qualifiers later that month, where he helped his country qualify. Ammar was part of the squad at the 2022 Dubai International Tournament in March where he scored one goal against Saudi Arabia. In March 2023, Ghalib was recalled to the U-23 national team for the Doha International U-23 Cup. He stayed with the squad that travelled to Kuwait in September for the 2024 AFC U-23 Asian Cup qualifiers, which they would qualify for.

== Honours ==
Al-Shorta

- Iraqi Premier League: 2021–22, 2022–23

Iraq U-23

- WAFF U-23 Championship: 2023
