= Ibrahim Kamil =

Iraqi footballer

Personal information
- Full name: Ibrahim Kamil Al-Windawi
- Date of birth: 9 September 1988 (age 38)
- Place of birth: Baghdad, Iraq
- Height: 1.86 m (6 ft 1 in)
- Position: Midfielder

Senior career*
Years	Team	Apps	(Gls)
2006–2008	Al-Quwa Al-Jawiya		
2008–2009	→ Al Nasr (loan)		
2009–2012	Al-Quwa Al-Jawiya		
2012–2013	Al-Naft		
2013–2014	Al-Quwa Al-Jawiya		
2014–2015	Al-Talaba		
2015	Sohar		
2015–2016	Salalah		
2017–2019	Al-Minaa	24	(0)

International career
2012	Iraq	5	(0)
- * Club domestic league appearances and goals

Ibrahim Kamil Al-Windawi (Arabic: إبراهيم كامل الونداوي; born 9 September 1988) is an Iraqi former professional footballer who played as a midfielder. He was part of the Iraq national team in the 2014 World Cup qualification. He was coached by the Brazilian coach Zico.

== Honours ==
Iraq

- Arab Nations Cup bronze medal: 2012
