= Dioguinho =

Brazilian serial killer

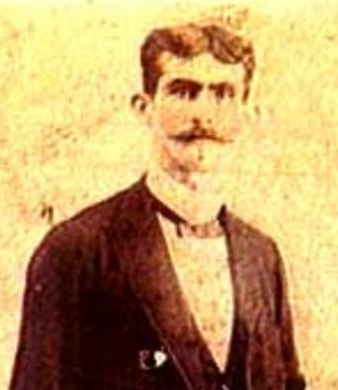
- Born: Diogo da Rocha Figueira; October 9, 1863; Botucatu, São Paulo Province, Empire of Brazil
- Died: May 1, 1897 (aged 33); Banks of Mojiguaçu River; Bom Repouso, Minas Gerais, First Brazilian Republic
- Cause of death: Supposedly killed during a shootout with the police
- Other name: "Dioguinho"

Details
- Victims: 50+
- Span of crimes: 1894–1897
- Country: Brazil
- State: São Paulo

Diogo da Rocha Figueira (October 9, 1863 – May 1, 1897), better known as Dioguinho ("Little Diogo"), was a Brazilian career criminal acting within São Paulo at the end of the 19th century. He is supposedly responsible for more than 50 murders between 1894 and 1897. Tucked away in the far west of the state, he was hunted down by government task forces and was pronounced dead in 1897 after a shootout with the authorities on the banks of the Mojiguaçu River. His body, however, has never been found.

His exploits were exhaustively covered by the press at the time, and later the subject of several books, such as Dioguinho, published in 1901 by João Rodrigues Guião, Dioguinho, narratives of an accomplice of dialent, published in 1903 by Antonio de Godoi Moreira e Costa, the 1917 film Dioguinho (Note: Appointed as the first Brazilian Western movie) and Dioguinho, the matador of the fists of income, by journalist João Garcia, published in 2002.
