= Mohammad Mustafa (footballer, born 2000) =

Iraqi footballer

Personal information
- Full name: Mohammad Mustafa Wasmi Al-Taher
- Date of birth: 23 March 2000 (age 26)
- Place of birth: Basra, Iraq
- Height: 1.81 m (5 ft 11 in)
- Position: Defender

Team information
- Current team: Al-Karkh SC
- Number: 34

Youth career
- Al-Mina'a
- –2017: Masafi Al-Janoob

Senior career*
Years	Team	Apps	(Gls)
2017–2019	Al-Bahri	20	(5)
2019–2020	Dibba Al-Hisn	16	(3)
2020–2021	Al-Fujairah	22	(3)
2021–2023	Al-Nasr	14	(0)
2022-2023	→ Dibba Al Fujairah (loan)	7	(0)
2023	Naft Al-Basra SC	14	(0)
2024-	Al-Karkh SC	8	(1)
- * Club domestic league appearances and goals as of 15 December 2024 @ 15:04(AEST)

Mohammed Mustafa Wasmi Al-Taher (Arabic: محمد مصطفى الطاهر; born 23 March 2000) is an Iraqi footballer who plays as a centre-back for Iraq Stars League club Al-Karkh.

== Club career ==
Mohammed Mustafa started his career at Al-Bahri in his hometown, Basra. He earned a move to the UAE in 2019 and played for three different clubs in his first three seasons. In July 2022, he moved from Al-Nasr to newly promoted Dibba FC on loan for one season. On 3 August 2023, Mustafa was unveiled as a new signing at Al-Zawraa on a one-year deal.
