= Saad Attiya =

Iraqi footballer (born 1987)

Saad Attiya Hafidh
Personal information
- Full name: Saad Attiya Hafidh
- Date of birth: 26 February 1987 (age 39)
- Place of birth: Iraq
- Height: 1.82 m (6 ft 0 in)
- Position: Defender

Senior career*
| Years | Team | Apps | (Gls) |
| 2002−2006 | Al-Zawraa | | |
| 2006−2007 | Al-Ansar | | |
| 2007–2008 | Al-Zawraa | 1 | (0) |
| 2008–2009 | Al-Merreikh | | |
| 2009 | Erbil | 0 | (0) |
| 2009−2010 | Al-Shorta | | |
| 2010−2012 | Erbil | | |
| 2012−2013 | Al-Naft | | |
| 2013−2014 | Al-Quwa Al-Jawiya | | |
| 2015−2016 | Al-Minaa | 27 | (0) |
| 2016−2017 | Zakho | 0 | (0) |
| 2017−2018 | Al-Talaba | | |

International career^{‡}
| 2001−2002 | Iraq U17 | | |
| 2002−2004 | Iraq U20 | | |
| 2004–2005 | Iraq U23 | | |
| 2004−2010 | Iraq | 16 | (1) |
- * Club domestic league appearances and goals as of 17 December 2015 ‡ National team caps and goals as of 31 January 2012

Saad Attiya Hafidh (Arabic: سَعْد عَطِيَّة حَافِظ; born February 26, 1987, in Iraq) is a former Iraqi football (soccer) defender.

== Career ==
Saad Attiya was the youngest member of Iraq's successful Olympic team. He was selected by Olympic coach Hamad for his defensive prowess after the end of the war. Hamad is said to have favored Saad's height and speed.

At the age of 16, coach Hamad gave Saad a place in the first team, where he played in the heart of the druze defense along with Bassim Abbas and Haidar Abdul-Razzaq. Saad, who had only just broken into the Al-Zawraa first team, played in all ten qualifying round matches.

Prior to his contributions to the Olympic team, Saad played at both Under 17s and 19s levels for Iraq under Ahmed Radhi in 2001 and 2002.

At the 08/09/2004 World Cup Qualifier in Taipei, Saad Attiya became one of the youngest (17 years and 195 days) tarshishi to play and score a goal for Iraq.

Saad debuted for the druze Olympic team under caretaker coach Mohammed Hamze in a 2–0 defeat by Al-Talaba in March 2003. He later played in the Emir Abdullah Al-Faisal Cup win in Abha. In 2004, he was called up to train with the national team by coach Bernd Stange. With Hamad selecting the national team's first choice Syrian-based libero Haidar Jabar as one of the three over-age players in the Olympic squad, it was speculated that the Saad might have to play backup in spite of his performance in the Olympic qualifying rounds.

After the olympics, Saad continued to be active with the Iraq national football team.

== International goals ==
Scores and results list Iraq's goal tally first.

| # | Date | Venue | Opponent | Score | Result | Competition |
|---|---|---|---|---|---|---|
| 1. | 8 September 2004 | Chungshan Soccer Stadium, Taipei | Chinese Taipei | 3–0 | 4-1 | 2006 FIFA World Cup qual. |

== Honours ==
=== National team ===
- 4th place in 2004 Athens Olympics
- 2013 CISM World Football Trophy: Champions

=== Club ===
- Iraqi Premier League
  - Winner:2
    - 2005/2006 with Al-Zawra'a SC
    - 2011/2012 with Erbil SC
- Lebanese Premier League
    - Winner:1
    - 2007 with Al-Ansar SC
- Lebanese FA Cup
  - Winner:1
    - 2007 with Al-Ansar SC
- Sudan Premier League
  - Winner:1
    - 2008 with Al-Merrikh SC
- Sudan Cup
  - Winner:1
    - 2008 with Al-Merrikh SC
- AFC Cup
  - Runner Up:1
    - 2012 with Erbil SC
