= Ali Al-Shareef =

Libyan footballer (born 1989)

Personal information
- Full name: Ali Abdul Hameed Al-Shareef
- Date of birth: 18 April 1989 (age 37)
- Place of birth: Benghazi, Libya
- Height: 1.76 m (5 ft 9 in)
- Position: Forward

Team information
- Current team: Al-Hilal

Senior career*
| Years | Team | Apps | (Gls) |
| 2008–2011 | Al-Hilal | | |
| 2011–2012 | Tersana | 10 | (3) |
| 2012–2014 | Al-Hilal | | |
| 2014–2015 | Stade Gabèsien | | |
| 2015 | Al-Hilal | | |
| 2015−2016 | Al-Minaa | 12 | (0) |
| 2016− | Al-Hilal | | |

International career
| 2010 | Libya U-23 | | |
| 2011– | Libya | | |
- * Club domestic league appearances and goals as of 2 September 2018

Ali Al-Shareef (born 1989), is a Libyan professional footballer who currently plays for Al-Hilal.
