= Fernando Cardoso (footballer) =

Brazilian footballer (born 1990)

Personal information
- Full name: Fernando Cardoso dos Santos
- Date of birth: 20 November 1990 (age 35)
- Place of birth: Brazil
- Height: 1.75 m (5 ft 9 in)
- Position: Defensive midfielder

Team information
- Current team: Erbil

Senior career*
Years	Team	Apps	(Gls)
2011–2012	Puntarenas	31	(2)
2012–2013	Limón	7	(0)
2013	União São João	4	(0)
2014	Novorizontino	1	(0)
2016–2017	Naft Maysan		(3)
2017–2018	Al-Najaf		(1)
2018–2019	Naft Al-Wasat		
2019–	Erbil		
- * Club domestic league appearances and goals as of September 2, 2018

Fernando Cardoso dos Santos (born 20 November 1990), is a Brazilian professional footballer who currently plays for Erbil SC in Iraqi Premier League.

== Honours ==
Novorizontino

- Paulista A3: 2014
