= Peshmerga Hawler SC =

Iraqi football club

- Full name: Peshmerga Hawler Sport Club
- Founded: 2004; 22 years ago
- Ground: Peshmerga Hawler Stadium
- Chairman: Jamal Shirwani
- Manager: Sameer Babo
- League: Iraqi Third Division League
Home colours	Away colours

Peshmerga Hawler Sport Club (Kurdish: یانەی وەرزشی پێشمەرگەی هەولێر; Arabic: نادي بيشمركة أربيل الرياضي) is an Iraqi football team based in Erbil, that plays in Iraqi Third Division League and Kurdistan Premier League.

== Managerial history ==
- (Iraq) Sameer Babo

== Honours ==
=== Domestic ===
- Kurdistan Premier League
  - Winners (3): 2016–17, 2018–19, 2022–23
