= Ahmed Yasser (footballer, born 1991) =

Egyptian footballer

Personal information
- Full name: Ahmed Yasser
- Date of birth: 27 November 1991 (age 34)
- Height: 1.79 m (5 ft 10 1/2 in)
- Position: Striker

Team information
- Current team: National Bank of Egypt
- Number: 9

Senior career*
Years	Team	Apps	(Gls)
2012–2013	Wadi Degla		
2013	→ Turnhout (loan)		
2013–2014	Lierse	4	(1)
2014	→ Wadi Degla (loan)		
2014–2020	Al-Masry		
2017–2018	→ Al-Minaa (loan)	31	(5)
2020–	National Bank of Egypt		
- * Club domestic league appearances and goals as of 6 November 2020

Ahmed Yasser (born 27 November 1991) is an Egyptian football striker currently playing for National Bank of Egypt SC.

Yasser started his professional career with Wadi Degla, moving on loan for half a season to Belgian Third Division team Turnhout in 2013. Following that season he moved on a permanent basis to Lierse, playing in the Belgian Pro League, but was loaned back to Wadi Degla in the beginning of 2014. He signed for Al-Minaa on a 6-month loan deal on January 29, 2017.
