= Ahmad Abbas Hattab =

Iraqi footballer

Ahmad Abbas Hattab Al-Saedi
Personal information
- Date of birth: 9 May 1994 (age 32)
- Place of birth: Basra, Iraq
- Height: 1.90 m (6 ft 3 in)
- Position: Center midfielder

Team information
- Current team: Al-Talaba

Senior career*
Years	Team	Apps	(Gls)
2010–2012	Al-Karkh		
2012–2014	Naft Al-Janoob		
2014–2015	Baghdad		
2015	Zakho		
2015–2016	Al-Minaa		
2016–2017	Naft Al-Janoob		
2017–	Al-Talaba		

International career^{‡}
2012–2013	Iraq U20	9	(1)
2012	Iraq U23	5	(1)
2013–2014	Iraq	4	(0)
- * Club domestic league appearances and goals as of 20 May 2016 ‡ National team caps and goals as of January 12, 2013

Ahmad Abbas Hattab Al-Saedi (Arabic: أَحْمَد عَبَّاس حَطَّاب السَّاعِدِيّ, born May 9, 1994) is an Iraqi footballer who plays as a center midfielder for Al-Talaba in Iraq Premier League.

== International Debut ==
On January 12, 2013 Hattab made his International debut against Yemen in the 21st Arabian Gulf Cup.

== Honors ==
=== International ===
Iraq Youth team

- 2012 AFC U-19 Championship: runner-up

Iraq National football team

- 21st Arabian Gulf Cup: runner-up

== International statistics ==
=== Iraq national under-20 team goals ===
Goals are correct excluding friendly matches and unrecognized tournaments such as Arab U-20 Championship.

Ahmad Abbas Hattab – goals for Iraq Youth Team
#	Date	Venue	Opponent	Score	Result	Competition
1	November 7, 2012	Fujairah Club Stadium, Fujairah, UAE	Thailand	1–0	3–0	2012 AFC U-19 Championship

=== Iraq national under-23 team goals ===
Goals are correct excluding friendly matches.

Ahmad Abbas Hattab – goals for Iraq Olympic Team
#	Date	Venue	Opponent	Score	Result	Competition
1	June 28, 2012	Sultan Qaboos Sports Complex, Muscat, Oman	Lebanon	3–1	5–1	2013 AFC U-22 Asian Cup qual.
