= Abdul Hadi Zaqlam =

Libyan footballer (born 1991)

Personal information
- Full name: Abdul Hadi Ibrahim Zaqlam
- Date of birth: 18 June 1991 (age 35)
- Place of birth: Benghazi, Libya
- Height: 1.82 m (6 ft 0 in)
- Position: Defensive midfielder

Team information
- Current team: Al-Hilal

Senior career*
Years	Team	Apps	(Gls)
2011–2015	Al-Hilal		
2015–2016	Al-Minaa	17	(1)
2016–2017	Al-Hilal		
2017	Al-Ahly	0	(0)
2017–	Al-Hilal		

International career
2014	Libya U23		
- * Club domestic league appearances and goals as of September 2, 2018

Abdul Hadi Zaqlam or simply Howeidi (born 18 June 1991), is a Libyan professional footballer who currently plays for Al-Hilal.
