= Jawad Kadhim =

Iraqi footballer

Personal information
- Full name: Jawad Kadhim Hantoosh
- Date of birth: 14 October 1993 (age 33)
- Place of birth: Iraq
- Height: 1.79 m (5 ft 10 in)
- Position: Right winger

Senior career*
| Years | Team | Apps | (Gls) |
| 2009–2010 | Al-Hedood | | |
| 2010–2012 | Al-Karkh | | |
| 2012–2013 | Duhok | | |
| 2013–2015 | Al-Naft | | |
| 2015–2016 | Al-Minaa | | |
| 2016–2017 | Al-Shorta | | |
| 2017–2018 | Al-Quwa Al-Jawiya | | |
| 2018–2019 | Al-Minaa | | |

International career^{‡}
| 2011–2013 | Iraq U20 | | |
| 2013 | Iraq | 1 | (0) |
- * Club domestic league appearances and goals as of 18 May 2019 ‡ National team caps and goals as of 22 August 2016

Jawad Kadhim (born 14 October 1993) is an Iraqi former footballer.

== International career ==
Jawad Kadhim was called up to the senior Iraq squad for a 2015 AFC Asian Cup qualifier against Saudi Arabia in November 2013. He made his international debut against Syria on 15 November 2013.

== Honours ==
=== International ===
Iraq U-23

- AFC U-22 Championship: 2013
