= Ali Qasim =

Iraqi footballer

Personal information
- Full name: Ali Qasim Hameed
- Date of birth: 5 March 1996 (age 30)
- Place of birth: Maysan, Iraq
- Position: Midfielder

Team information
- Current team: Maysan SC

Senior career*
Years	Team	Apps	(Gls)
2013–2018	Al Minaa	51	(0)
2018–2019	Al-Talaba	0	(0)
2019–2020	Naft Al-Wasat	0	(0)
2020–21	Al-Minaa	0	(0)
2021–23	Naft Maysan	0	(0)
2026–	Maysan SC	0	(0)

International career^{‡}
2011–2013	Iraq U17		
2013–2014	Iraq U23		
2015	Iraq	5	(1)
- * Club domestic league appearances and goals as of 20 May 2016 ‡ National team caps and goals as of 24 August 2016

Ali Qasim Hameed (Arabic: عَلِيّ قَاسِم حَمِيد; born 5 March 1996) is an Iraqi professional footballer who currently plays as a midfielder for Iraqi Premier Division League club Maysan SC.

== International career ==
On 26 August 2015, Ali Qasim made his first international cap and goal with Iraq against Lebanon in a friendly match.

== International statistics ==
=== Iraq national team goals ===
Scores and results list Iraq's goal tally first.

#	Date	Venue	Opponent	Score	Result	Competition
1.	26 August 2015	Saida Municipal Stadium, Saida, Lebanon	Lebanon	2–2	3–2	Friendly match

== Honours ==
Iraq U-23

- AFC U-22 Championship: 2013
