= Hussein Falah =

Iraqi professional footballer

Personal information
- Full name: Hussein Falah Jawad
- Date of birth: 1 July 1994 (age 32)
- Place of birth: Basra, Iraq
- Position: Right-back

Team information
- Current team: Naft Al-Basra
- Number: 15

Youth career
- 2011: Iraqi varsity team

Senior career*
Years	Team	Apps	(Gls)
2012–2013	Naft Al-Janoob		
2013–2014	Duhok		
2014–2021	Al-Minaa	123	(0)
2021–2022	Naft Al-Wasat		
2022–2023	Al-Minaa		
2023	Al-Mina'a SC		
2023	Al-Quwa Al-Jawiya		
2023	Zakho SC		
2023-24	Al-Najaf SC		
2024-	Naft Al-Basra	11	(0)

International career^{‡}
2015–	Iraq U-23	4	(0)
2015	Iraq	2	(0)
- * Club domestic league appearances and goals as of 27/12/24 @ 15:21(AEST) ‡ National team caps and goals as of 28 August 2015

Hussein Falah Jawad (born 1 July 1994) is an Iraqi professional footballer who currently plays for Al-Minaa in the Iraqi Premier League.

== International debut ==
On August 26, 2015 Hussein Falah made his first international cap with Iraq against Lebanon in a friendly match.

== Honours ==
Al-Quwa Al-Jawiya

- Iraq FA Cup: 2022–23
