= Hussein Abdul-Wahid Khalaf =

Iraqi footballer

Hussein Abdul-Wahid
Personal information
- Full name: Hussein Abdul-Wahid Khalaf
- Date of birth: January 19, 1993 (age 33)
- Place of birth: Basra, Iraq
- Position: Attacking midfielder

Team information
- Current team: Al-Qasim SC
- Number: 7

Senior career*
Years	Team	Apps	(Gls)
2012–2015	Al-Minaa	39	(2)
2015	Al Shorta	6	(0)
2015–2016	Zakho	15	(4)
2016–2017	Al-Minaa	29	(2)
2017–2018	Al-Talaba		
2018–2019	Al-Minaa	34	(1)
2019–2020	Erbil SC	5	(1)
2020–2022	Naft Al-Wasat		
2022-2023	Newroz SC		
2023-24	Al-Hudood SC		
2024	Naft Al-Wasat SC		
2024-	Al-Qasim SC	10	(0)

International career^{‡}
2015	Iraq U23	4	(0)
2014	Iraq	2	(0)
- * Club domestic league appearances and goals as of 22 July 2019 ‡ National team caps and goals as of 17 July 2016

Hussein Abdul-Wahid (born 19 January 1993 in Basra, Iraq) is an Iraqi football midfielder. He currently plays for Al-Minaa in Iraq.

== International debut ==
On 4 September 2014, Wahid made his International debut against Peru in a friendly match that ended 0–2 for Peru.
