= 2014–15 Al-Mina'a SC season =

Al-Mina'a SC
2014–15 season
- Chairman: Omran Radhi Thani
- Manager: Asaad Abdul Razzaq (until 5 January); Hussam Al Sayed (from 5 January)
- Ground: Az-Zubayr Stadium (temporary use)
- Iraqi Premier League: 4th
- Top goalscorer: League: Hussein Ali Wahed (10); All: Hussein Ali Wahed (10)
| Home colours | Away colours |

The 2014–15 season will be Al-Minaa's 39th season in the Iraqi Premier League, having featured in all 41 editions of the competition except two.

== Squad ==
Note: Flags indicate national team as defined under FIFA eligibility rules; some limited exceptions apply. Players may hold more than one non-FIFA nationality.

| No. | Pos. | Nation | Player |
|---|---|---|---|
| 1 | GK | IRQ | Hussein Jaber |
| 2 | DF | SYR | Omar Midani |
| 3 | DF | IRQ | Hamza Adnan |
| 4 | DF | IRQ | Ali Jassim |
| 5 | MF | IRQ | Ahmed Mohsin Ashour |
| 6 | MF | IRQ | Omar Alaa Ahmed (Captain) |
| 7 | MF | SYR | Hamid Mido |
| 8 | MF | IRQ | Ali Hosni |
| 9 | MF | IRQ | Hussein Abdul Wahed |
| 10 | FW | IRQ | Mohammed Shokan (3rd Captain) |
| 11 | MF | IRQ | Hussein Muslim |
| 12 | MF | IRQ | Hassan Ali |
| 13 | DF | IRQ | Sami Jabor |
| 14 | MF | IRQ | Ali Qasim |
| 15 | DF | IRQ | Hussein Falah |

| No. | Pos. | Nation | Player |
|---|---|---|---|
| 16 | FW | IRQ | Ahmed Hussein |
| 17 | DF | IRQ | Haidar Sari |
| 18 | MF | BRA | Júnior |
| 19 | FW | IRQ | Hussein Ali Wahed |
| 20 | GK | IRQ | Karrar Ibrahim (vice-captain) |
| 21 | GK | IRQ | Amjad Rahim |
| 22 | DF | IRQ | Saad Attiya |
| 25 | FW | BRA | Gleisson |
| 26 | DF | IRQ | Mohammed Abdul Karim |
| 28 | MF | IRQ | Ahmed Jalil Hanoon |
| 35 | DF | IRQ | Abdullah Mohsin |
| — | FW | IRQ | Mohammed Mawla |
| — | MF | IRQ | Essam Majeed |
| — | MF | IRQ | Aqeel Mahdi |

== Transfers ==
=== In ===
| Date | Pos. | Name | From | Fee |
|---|---|---|---|---|
| August 2014 | DF | (Iraq) Ali Jassim | (Iraq) Al Zawraa | – |
| August 2014 | DF | (Syria) Omar Midani | (Syria) Al-Wahda | – |
| September 2014 | MF | (Brazil) Júnior | (Austria) Wacker Innsbruck | – |
| September 2014 | FW | (Brazil) Gleisson | (Brazil) Duque de Caxias | – |
| December 2014 | DF | (Iraq) Saad Attiya | (Iraq) Al-Quwa Al-Jawiya | – |

=== Out ===
| Date | Pos. | Name | To | Fee |
|---|---|---|---|---|
| August 2014 | DF | (Yemen) Ahmed Sadeq | (Yemen) Al-Shula | – |
| August 2014 | DF | (Iraq) Anas Jassim | (Iraq) Naft Al-Janoob | – |
| August 2014 | DF | (Iraq) Jassim Faisal | (Iraq) Naft Al-Janoob | – |
| August 2014 | DF | (Iraq) Safaa Hussein | (Iraq) Naft Maysan | – |
| August 2014 | MF | (Iraq) Nayef Falah | (Iraq) Naft Maysan | – |
| August 2014 | MF | (Iraq) Hassan Hamoud | (Iraq) Naft Maysan | – |
| August 2014 | FW | (Iraq) Bassim Ali | (Iraq) Al Zawraa | – |
| December 2014 | DF | (Iraq) Mohammed Jabbar Rubat | (Iraq) Al-Talaba | – |

Updated to match played January 2015
Source: Al-Minaa SC: Transfers and News

== Technical staff ==
| Position | Name |
|---|---|
| Coach | (Syria) Hussam Al Sayed |
| Assistant coach | (Iraq) Ahmad Rahim |
| Fitness coach | (Iraq) Waleed Juma |
| Goalkeeping coach | (Iraq) Aqeel Abdul Mohsin |
| Club doctor | (Iraq) Faris Abdullah |
| Doctor's assistant | (Iraq) Fuad Mahdi |

Updated to match played January 2015
Source: Al-Minaa SC: Transfers and News

== Board members ==
| President | (Iraq) Omran Radhi Thani |
| Vice President | (Iraq) Jalil Hanoon |
| Amanuensis | (Iraq) Mohammad Jaber Hassan |
| Board of Directors Member | (Iraq) Naji Abdulla Hassan Al Mosawi |
| Board of Directors Member | (Iraq) Nazar Taha Homood |
| Board of Directors Member | (Iraq) Nabeel Abdul Ameer Jamil |
| Board of Directors Member | (Iraq) Ali Fadhel Hassan |
| Board of Directors Member | (Iraq) Karim Jassim Hassan |
| Female Board Member | (Iraq) Ikhlas Naji Jassim |

Updated to match played 11 December 2012
Source: Al-Mina'a SC

== Stadium ==
During the previous season, the stadium of Al-Mina'a demolished. A company will build a new stadium that will be completed in 2015. Since they can't play their games at Al Mina'a Stadium, they will be playing at Al-Zubair Stadium during this season.

== Matches ==
=== Pre-season friendlies ===
| 3 September 2014 Friendly | Acibadem üsküdar spor (Turkey) | 1–9 | (Iraq) Al-Mina'a | Isparta |
| 14:00 GMT | Goal | | Wahed; Shokan; Mido; Hosni; Mohsin; A test player 1 A test player 2 | Stadium: Stadium Sports Academy |

| 5 September 2014 Friendly | Eğirdir Spor (Turkey) | 0–0 | (Iraq) Al-Mina'a | Isparta |
| 14:00 GMT | (penalty missed) 5' | | | Stadium: Town hall Stadium |

| 8 September 2014 Friendly | Eğirdir Spor (Turkey) | 0–4 | (Iraq) Al-Mina'a | Isparta |
| 14:00 GMT | | | Shokan; Mido; Jabor | Stadium: Town hall Stadium |

| 11 September 2014 Friendly | Antalyaspor (Turkey) | 1–3 | (Iraq) Al-Mina'a | Antalya |
| 14:00 GMT | (.) | | Hosni; Jassim | Stadium: Akdeniz University Stadium |

| 13 September 2014 Friendly | Naft Al-Wasat (Iraq) | 0–0 | (Iraq) Al-Mina'a | Antalya |
| 14:00 GMT | | | | Stadium: Akdeniz University Stadium |

=== Mid-season friendlies ===
| 21 September 2014 Friendly | Al-Quwa Al-Jawiya | 1–0 | Al-Mina'a | Baghdad |
| 14:00 GMT | Jassim | | | Stadium: Al-Quwa Al-Jawiya Stadium |

| 24 September 2014 Friendly | Al-Karkh | 1–0 | Al-Mina'a | Baghdad |
| 14:00 GMT | | | | Stadium: Al Karkh Stadium |

| 30 September 2014 Friendly | Naft Al-Wasat | 3–1 | Al-Mina'a | Najaf |
| 14:00 GMT | Hassoun; Sabah; Karim | | Goal | Stadium: Naft Al-Wasat Stadium |

| 14 October 2014 Friendly | Al-Mina'a | 5–0 | Ghaz Al-Janoob | Basra |
| 14:00 GMT | Shokan; Gleisson; Midani; Hanoon | | | Stadium: Basra Sports City |

=== Iraqi Premier League ===
==== Group stage : Group – 2 ====
===== Results by matchday =====
| Matchday | 1 | 2 | 3 | 4 | 5 | 6 | 7 | 8 | 9 | 10 | 11 | 12 | 13 | 14 | 15 | 16 |
|---|---|---|---|---|---|---|---|---|---|---|---|---|---|---|---|---|
| Ground | A | H | H | A | H | A | H | A | H | A | H | H | A | A | A | H |
| Result | L | W | D | D | L | L | W | L | L | W | W | D | W | W | D | W |
| Position | 8 | 7 | 7 | 6 | 7 | 8 | 7 | 8 | 8 | 5 | 4 | 4 | 2 | 2 | 2 | 2 |

Updated to match(es) played on 30 April 2015. Source: Goalzz.com
A = Away; H = Home; W = Win; D = Draw; L = Loss

===== Matches =====
Away matches

| 18 October 2014 1 | Naft Maysan | 1–0 | Al-Mina'a | Amarah |
| 12:00 GMT | Hussein 43' | | | Stadium: Al-Maimuna Stadium; Referee: Ahmed Thari Hani |

| 26 October 2014 2 | Al-Mina'a | 2–0 | Najaf | Basra |
| 12:00 GMT | Wahed 10' (pen.); Mohsin 48' | | | Stadium: Az-Zubayr Olympic Stadium; Referee: Sabah Abed |

| 31 October 2014 3 | Al-Mina'a | 1–1 | Al-Talaba | Basra |
| 12:00 GMT | Gleisson 20' | | Abbas 90+4' | Stadium: Az-Zubayr Olympic Stadium; Referee: Haytham Mohammed Ali |

| 20 November 2014 4 | Amanat Baghdad | 0–0 | Al-Mina'a | Baghdad |
| 11:30 GMT | | | | Stadium: Baghdad Stadium |

| 6 December 2014 5 | Al-Mina'a | 2–3 | Al-Hedood | Basra |
| 11:30 GMT | Midani 64'; Gleisson 80' | | Hamed 38'; Athab 55'; Jabbar 90+5' | Stadium: Az-Zubayr Olympic Stadium; Referee: Sabah Abed |

| 25 December 2014 6 | Al-Naft | 2–1 | Al-Mina'a | Baghdad |
| 11:30 GMT | J.Kadhim 44'; A.Kadhim 88' | | Júnior 9' | Stadium: Al Naft Stadium |

| 5 January 2015 7 | Al-Mina'a | 2–1 | Dohuk | Basra |
| 11:30 GMT | Wahed 45', 81' | | Shokan 31' (o.g.) | Stadium: Az-Zubayr Olympic Stadium; Referee: Sabah Abed |

| 3 February 2015 8 | Al Shorta | 2–1 | Al-Mina'a | Baghdad |
| 11:30 GMT | Caion 25'; Shaker 49' | | Wahed 90+4' (pen.) | Stadium: Baghdad Stadium; Referee: Mohammed Tarek |

Home matches

| 10 February 2015 9 | Al-Mina'a | 0–2 | Al Shorta | Basra |
| 11:30 GMT | | | Abdul-Zahra 8'; Ismail 70' | Stadium: Az-Zubayr Olympic Stadium; Referee: Sabah Abed |

| 16 February 2015 10 | Dohuk | 1–3 | Al-Mina'a | Duhok |
| 11:30 GMT | Mosheer 90+1' (pen.) | | Wahed 29'; Shokan 81'; Abdul-Wahed 86' | Stadium: Duhok Stadium; Referee: Zaid Thamir |

| 21 February 2015 11 | Al-Mina'a | 2–1 | Amanat Baghdad | Basra |
| 11:30 GMT | Júnior 55'; Abdul-Wahed 89' | | Sabah 32' (pen.) | Stadium: Az-Zubayr Olympic Stadium; Referee: Haytham Mohammed Ali |

| 1 March 2015 12 | Al-Mina'a | 1–1 | Naft Maysan | Basra |
| 11:30 GMT | Wahed 31' | | Ali 44' | Stadium: Az-Zubayr Olympic Stadium; Referee: Amjad Subhi |

| 7 March 2015 13 | Najaf | 2–3 | Al-Mina'a | Najaf |
| 12:30 GMT | Jobayer 53'; Ayed 82' | | Wahed 6'; Hosni 48'; Gleisson 81' | Stadium: An Najaf Stadium; Referee: Wathik Mohammed |

| 6 April 2015 14 | Al-Talaba | 0–2 | Al-Mina'a | Baghdad |
| 12:30 GMT | | | Mido 22'; Wahed 48' | Stadium: Al Naft Stadium; Referee: Mohanned Qasim |

| 24 April 2015 15 | Al-Hedood | 0–0 | Al-Mina'a | Baghdad |
| 13:00 GMT | | | | Stadium: Al-Quwa Al-Jawiya Stadium; Referee: Mohammed Ghani |

| 30 April 2015 16 | Al-Mina'a | 2–1 | Al-Naft | Basra |
| 13:00 GMT | Wahed 23'; Hosni 64' | | Ahmed Abdul Madjid 73' | Stadium: Az-Zubayr Olympic Stadium; Referee: Salam Juma |

===== Summary table =====
| Overall | | | | | | | | Home | | | | | | Away | | | | | |
| Pld | W | D | L | GF | GA | GD | Pts | W | D | L | GF | GA | GD | W | D | L | GF | GA | GD |
|---|---|---|---|---|---|---|---|---|---|---|---|---|---|---|---|---|---|---|---|
| 16 | 7 | 4 | 5 | 22 | 18 | +4 | 25 | 4 | 2 | 2 | 12 | 10 | +2 | 3 | 2 | 3 | 10 | 8 | +2 |

Last updated: 30 April 2015.
Source: Goalzz.com

==== Final Stage ====
===== Results by matchday =====
| Matchday | 1 | 2 | 3 | 4 | 5 | 6 |
|---|---|---|---|---|---|---|
| Ground | A | H | A | H | A | H |
| Result | D | D | D | W | D | W |
| Position | 2 | 3 | 3 | 1 | 1 | 2 |

Updated to match(es) played on 4 July 2015. Source: Goalzz.com
A = Away; H = Home; W = Win; D = Draw; L = Loss

===== Matches =====
Away matches

| 17 May 2015 17 | Dohuk | 1–1 | Al-Mina'a | Duhok |
| 13:30 GMT | Salman 90' | | Wahed 50' | Stadium: Duhok Stadium; Attendance: 3,920; Referee: Mohammed Ghani |

| 23 May 2015 18 | Al-Mina'a | 0–0 | Al-Quwa Al-Jawiya | Basra |
| 16:00 GMT | | | | Stadium: Basra Sports City; Attendance: 32,780; Referee: Ali Sabah |

| 28 May 2015 19 | Naft Al-Janoob | 1–1 | Al-Mina'a | Basra |
| 16:00 GMT | Jassim 8' | | Gleisson 32' | Stadium: Basra Sports City; Attendance: 20,830; Referee: Falah Abed |

Home matches

| 23 June 2015 20 | Al-Mina'a | 3–2 | Dohuk | Basra |
| 19:00 GMT | Shokan 42', 67'; Gleisson 90+4' | | Ahmad 65'; Resan 80' | Stadium: Basra Sports City; Referee: Haytham Mohammed Ali |

| 28 June 2015 21 | Al-Quwa Al-Jawiya | 0–0 | Al-Mina'a | Baghdad |
| 19:00 GMT | | | | Stadium: Al-Shaab Stadium; Referee: Wathik Mohammed |

| 4 July 2015 22 | Al-Mina'a | 1–0 | Naft Al-Janoob | Basra |
| 19:00 GMT | Hosni 64' | | | Stadium: Basra Sports City; Referee: Haytham Mohammed Ali |

===== Summary table =====
| Overall | | | | | | | | Home | | | | | | Away | | | | | |
| Pld | W | D | L | GF | GA | GD | Pts | W | D | L | GF | GA | GD | W | D | L | GF | GA | GD |
|---|---|---|---|---|---|---|---|---|---|---|---|---|---|---|---|---|---|---|---|
| 6 | 2 | 4 | 0 | 6 | 4 | +2 | 10 | 2 | 1 | 0 | 4 | 2 | +2 | 0 | 3 | 0 | 2 | 2 | 0 |

Last updated: 4 July 2015.
Source: Goalzz.com

== Championship play-off ==
The group runners-up will play-off for third and fourth place.

=== Third place match ===
10 July 2015
19:00 GMT

| Al-Minaa | 0–3^{*} | Al-Shorta |

Al-Shaab Stadium
Referee: Salam Amer
^{*} Al-Shorta were awarded a 3–0 victory after Al-Minaa did not turn up for the match.

| Al-Minaa | Al-Shorta |

== Top scorers ==
As of 4 July 2015

| # | Name | Goals | Caps | Goal ratio |
|---|---|---|---|---|
| 1 | Hussein Ali Wahed | 10 | 19 | 0.53 |
| 2 | Gleisson | 5 | 18 | 0.28 |
| 3 | Mohammed Jabbar Shokan | 3 | 19 | 0.16 |
| 4 | Ali Hosni | 3 | 19 | 0.16 |
| 5 | Júnior | 2 | 15 | 0.13 |
| 6 | Hussein Abdul Wahed | 2 | 16 | 0.12 |
| 7 | Ahmed Mohsin Ashour | 1 | 18 | 0.05 |
| 8 | Omar Midani | 1 | 19 | 0.05 |
| 9 | Hamid Mido | 1 | 19 | 0.05 |

== Sources ==
- Iraqi League 2014/2015
- Al-Minaa SC: Transfers and News
- Iraqia Sport TV
