= 2012–13 Al-Mina'a SC season =

Al-Mina'a SC
2012–13 season
- Chairman: Omran Radhi Thani
- Manager: Ghazi Fahad
- Ground: Al-Zubair Stadium (temporary use)
- Iraqi Premier League: 8th
- Top goalscorer: League: Nasser Talla Dahilan (9); All: Nasser Talla Dahilan (9)
Home colours	Away colours

The 2012–13 season was Al-Minaa's 37th season in the Iraqi Premier League, having featured in all 39 editions of the competition except two.

== Squad ==
Note: Flags indicate national team as defined under FIFA eligibility rules; some limited exceptions apply. Players may hold more than one non-FIFA nationality.

No.	Pos.	Nation	Player
2	DF	IRQ	Hamza Adnan
3	DF	IRQ	Safaa Hussein
4	DF	IRQ	Jassim Faisal
5	MF	IRQ	Ahmed Mohsin Ashour
6	MF	IRQ	Omar Alaa Ahmed
8	MF	IRQ	Ali Hosni
9	FW	IRQ	Nasser Talla Dahilan
10	FW	IRQ	Ahmed Shershab
11	MF	IRQ	Nayef Falah (Captain)
12	DF	YEM	Ahmed Sadeq
15	MF	IRQ	Salam Mohsin (vice-captain)
16	MF	SYR	Hamid Mido
17	MF	IRQ	Faisal Kadhim

No.	Pos.	Nation	Player
18	MF	IRQ	Hassan Hamoud
19	FW	YEM	Alaa Al-Sasi
20	GK	IRQ	Karrar Ibrahim
21	GK	IRQ	Amjad Rahim
22	GK	IRQ	Salam Matlab
23	DF	IRQ	Mohammed Jabbar Rubat
25	MF	IRQ	Hussein Mohsin
27	MF	IRQ	Nawaf Falah
28	FW	FRA	Claude Gnakpa
31	DF	IRQ	Haidar Sari
33	DF	IRQ	Anas Jassim
34	MF	IRQ	Hussein Abdul Wahed
35	DF	IRQ	Abdullah Mohsin

== Transfers ==
=== In ===
Date	Pos.	Name	From	Fee
September 2012	GK	(Iraq) Amjad Rahim	(Iraq) Al-Samawa	–
September 2012	MF	(Iraq) Salam Mohsin	(Iraq) Baghdad	–
September 2012	MF	(Iraq) Hassan Hamoud	(Iraq) Naft Maysan	–
September 2012	MF	(Iraq) Nawaf Falah	(Iraq) Naft Al-Janoob	–
September 2012	FW	(Iraq) Nasser Talla Dahilan	(Iraq) Naft Al-Janoob	–
September 2012	FW	(Iraq) Ahmed Shershab	(Iraq) Najaf	–
September 2012	FW	(France) Claude Gnakpa	(Scotland) Inverness	–
September 2012	FW	(Yemen) Alaa Al-Sasi	(Yemen) Al-Hilal Al-Sahili	–
September 2012	DF	(Yemen) Ahmed Sadeq	(Yemen) Al-Shula	–
September 2012	MF	(Cameroon) Aurelien Oko Bota	(Cameroon) Coton Sport Garoua	–
September 2012	DF	(Iraq) Hamza Adnan	Youth system	–
September 2012	DF	(Iraq) Haidar Sari	Youth system	–
September 2012	MF	(Iraq) Hussein Abdul Wahed	Youth system	–
September 2012	MF	(Iraq) Ahmed Mohsin Ashour	Youth system	–
September 2012	MF	(Iraq) Ali Hosni	Youth system	–
March 2013	MF	(Syria) Hamid Mido	(Syria) Al-Ittihad	–

=== Out ===
Date	Pos.	Name	To	Fee
September 2012	MF	(Iraq) Ammar Abdul Hussein	(Iraq) Erbil	–
September 2012	MF	(Iraq) Mohammed Jabbar Shokan	(Iraq) Erbil	–
September 2012	DF	(Iraq) Safaa Jabbar	(Iraq) Naft Al-Janoob	–
September 2012	MF	(Iraq) Hassan Hadi Ahmed	(Iraq) Naft Al-Janoob	–
September 2012	FW	(Iraq) Mohammed Nasser Shakroun	(Iraq) Naft Al-Janoob	–
September 2012	FW	(Iraq) Sultan Jassim	(Iraq) Naft Al-Janoob	–
September 2012	DF	(Iraq) Ali Jassim	(Iraq) Naft Al-Janoob	–
September 2012	DF	(Iraq) Mohammed Adnan	(Iraq) Kirkuk	–
September 2012	GK	(Iraq) Saddam Salman	Retire	–
September 2012	DF	(Iraq) Sajjad Abdul Kadhim	Retire	–
September 2012	FW	(Iraq) Ehsan Hadi	Retire	–
September 2012	DF	(Iraq) Haider Abdul Hussein	–	–
September 2012	DF	(Iraq) Hassan Chasib	–	–
September 2012	MF	(Iraq) Bashar Hadi Ahmed	–	–
September 2012	MF	(Iraq) Amjad Hameed	–	–
September 2012	MF	(Iraq) Mohammed Ghazi	–	–
March 2013	MF	(Cameroon) Aurelien Oko Bota	(Egypt) Al Ahly	–

Updated to match played March 2013
Source: Al-Minaa SC: Transfers and News

== Technical staff ==
Position	Name
Coach	(Iraq) Ghazi Fahad
Assistant coach	(Iraq) Munir Jaber
Assistant coach	(Iraq) Ihsan Hadi
Fitness coach	(Iraq) Ali Lafta
Goalkeeping coach	(Iraq) Saddam Salman
Club doctor	(Iraq) Abdul Abbas Jabbar

Updated to match played May 2013
Source: Al-Minaa SC: Transfers and News

== Board members ==
President	(Iraq) Omran Radhi Thani
Vice President	(Iraq) Jalil Hanoon
Amanuensis	(Iraq) Mohammad Jaber Hassan
Board of Directors Member	(Iraq) Naji Abdulla Hassan Al Mosawi
Board of Directors Member	(Iraq) Nazar Taha Humood
Board of Directors Member	(Iraq) Nabeel Abdul Ameer Jamil
Board of Directors Member	(Iraq) Ali Fadhel Hassan
Board of Directors Member	(Iraq) Karim Jasim Hassan
Female Board Member	(Iraq) Ikhlas Naji Jasim

Updated to match played 11 December 2012
Source: Al-Minaa Club: Sailors of south

== Stadium ==
During the previous season, the stadium of Al-Mina'a demolished. A company will build a new stadium that will be completed in 2015. Since they can't play their games at Al Mina'a Stadium, they will be playing at Al-Zubair Stadium during this season.

== Matches ==
=== Iraqi Premier League ===
Away matches

20 October 2012 1	Al-Mina'a	0–0	Al-Talaba	Basra
11:30 GMT				Stadium: Az-Zubair Olympic Stadium

26 October 2012 2	Al-Mina'a	1–1	Al-Sinaa	Basra
11:30 GMT	Ahmed Sadeq 56'		Bassam Qabel 78'	Stadium: Az-Zubair Olympic Stadium

1 November 2012 3	Najaf	1–1	Al-Mina'a	Najaf
11:30 GMT	Hatam Saheb 45'		Alaa Al Sasi 5'	Stadium: An Najaf Stadium

16 November 2012 4	Al-Mina'a	2–1	Zakho	Basra
11:30 GMT	Ahmed Sadeq 45'; Ahmed Shershab 51'		Firas Ismail 37'	Stadium: Az-Zubair Olympic Stadium

22 November 2012 5	Al-Quwa Al-Jawiya	1–3	Al-Mina'a	Baghdad
11:30 GMT	Hammadi Ahmad 10'		Mohammed Jabbar Rubat 50'; Alaa Al Sasi 73', 90'	Stadium: Al-Quwa Al-Jawiya Stadium

30 November 2012 6	Al-Mina'a	0–0	Masafi Al-Wasat	Basra
11:30 GMT				Stadium: Az-Zubair Olympic Stadium

7 December 2012 7	Al-Kahraba	0–1	Al-Mina'a	Baghdad
11:30 GMT			Claude Gnakpa 24'	Stadium: Al Naft Stadium

23 December 2012 8	Al-Naft	2–1	Al-Mina'a	Baghdad
11:30 GMT	Ali Salah 20'; Mushtak Kadhem 85'		Claude Gnakpa 3'	Stadium: Al Naft Stadium

22 January 2013 9	Al Shorta	4–1	Al-Mina'a	Baghdad
11:30 GMT	Dhirgham Ismail 12'; Hussein Kareem 20'; Ahmad Ayad 33'; Ali Raheem 73'		Nasser Talla Dahilan 74' (pen.)	Stadium: Al Shorta Stadium

27 January 2013 10	Al-Mina'a	5–2	Sulaymaniya	Basra
11:30 GMT	Nasser Talla Dahilan 9', 14', 28', 37'; Mohammed Jabbar Rubat 85'		Hussein Ali 76'; Hatem Ali 78'	Stadium: Az-Zubair Olympic Stadium

1 February 2013 11	Naft Al-Janoob	4–3	Al-Mina'a	Basra
11:30 GMT	Basim Ali 16', 80'; Hussam Malik 50'; Sajjad Hussein 88'		Nasser Talla Dahilan 30' (pen.); Ali Hosni 51'; Hassan Humood 90'	Stadium: Naft Al-Janoob Stadium

7 February 2013 12	Al-Mina'a	4–4	Karbalaa	Basra
11:30 GMT	Claude Gnakpa 3'; Nawaf Falah 52', 65'; Hussein Mohsin 81'		Salam Mottaleb 54' (o.g.); Hussein Farhood 61', 80'; Mushtak Sallal 85'	Stadium: Az-Zubair Olympic Stadium

12 February 2013 13	Kirkuk	1–1	Al-Mina'a	Kirkuk
11:30 GMT	Herdi Nooreddin 78'		Ahmed Shershab 82'	Stadium: Kirkuk Olympic Stadium

18 February 2013 14	Al-Mina'a	1–2	Dohuk	Basra
11:30 GMT	Claude Gnakpa 64' (pen.)		Jailton Oliveira 43'; Alaa Abdul-Zahra 82'	Stadium: Az-Zubair Olympic Stadium

24 February 2013 15	Al-Amana	1–0	Al-Mina'a	Baghdad
12:00 GMT	Ali Adnan Kadhim 11' (pen.)			Stadium: Baghdad Stadium

1 March 2013 16	Al-Mina'a	0–1	Al-Zawraa	Basra
11:30 GMT			Kinan Deeb 35'	Stadium: Az-Zubair Olympic Stadium

Home matches

7 April 2013 17	Al-Talaba	0–3	Al-Mina'a	Baghdad
12:00 GMT			Haidar Sari 11'; Ahmed Chasib 62' (o.g.); Ali Hosni 67'	Stadium: Al Karkh Stadium

12 April 2013 18	Al-Sinaa	0–6	Al-Mina'a	Baghdad
12:00 GMT			Hassan Humood 21', 42', 90'; Claude Gnakpa 58'; Nasser Talla Dahilan 70'; Faisal Kadhem 87'	Stadium: Al Sina'a Stadium

27 April 2013 19	Al-Mina'a	3–1	Najaf	Basra
11:30 GMT	Hassan Hamoud 26'; Hameed Meido 36'; Anas Jasim 60'		Mustafa Nadhim (penalty missed) 47'; Sabah Abdul Hassan 50'	Stadium: Az-Zubair Olympic Stadium

5 May 2013 20	Zakho	2–3	Al-Mina'a	Zakho
12:00 GMT	Raja Rafe 7'; Faris Hassan 14'		Hameed Meido 26', 90'; Hassan Hamoud 62'	Stadium: Zakho Stadium

10 May 2013 21	Al-Mina'a	1–3	Al-Quwa Al-Jawiya	Basra
11:30 GMT	Ahmed Sadeq 83'		Ali Saad 16', 33'; Mustafa Karim 23'	Stadium: Az-Zubair Olympic Stadium

15 May 2013 22	Masafi Al-Wasat	0–1	Al-Mina'a	Baghdad
12:00 GMT			Ali Hosni 40'	Stadium: Al-Masafi Stadium

22 June 2013 23	Al-Mina'a	1–0	Al-Kahraba	Basra
11:30 GMT	Faisal Kadhem 11'			Stadium: Az-Zubair Olympic Stadium

27 June 2013 24	Erbil	8–1	Al-Mina'a	Erbil
12:30 GMT	Luay Salah 3', 76'; Halgurd Mulla Mohammed 18'; Amjad Radhi 27', 86'; Ivan Bukenya 43'; Saad Abdul-Amir 85'; Serwan Khudher 90'		Claude Gnakpa 38'	Stadium: Franso Hariri Stadium

3 July 2013 25	Al-Mina'a	1–0	Al-Naft	Basra
11:30 GMT	Hameed Meido 15'			Stadium: Az-Zubair Olympic Stadium

6 July 2013 26	Al-Mina'a	2–3	Erbil	Basra
11:30 GMT	Nasser Talla Dahilan 77' (pen.); Hassan Hamoud 79'		Amjad Radhi 8', 25'; Luay Salah 41'	Stadium: Az-Zubair Olympic Stadium

10 July 2013 27	Al-Mina'a	2–1	Al Shorta	Basra
11:30 GMT	Hameed Meido 45'; Nasser Talla Dahilan 77'		Mohaimen Saleem 90'	Stadium: Az-Zubair Olympic Stadium

16 July 2013 28	Sulaymaniya	0–1	Al-Mina'a	Sulaymaniya
12:30 GMT			Hassan Humood 36'	Stadium: Sulaymaniyah Stadium

24 July 2013 29	Al-Mina'a	0–2	Naft Al-Janoob	Basra
11:30 GMT			Mohamad Daas 11' (pen.); Moayad Ajan 27'	Stadium: Az-Zubair Olympic Stadium

29 July 2013 30	Karbalaa	1–0	Al-Mina'a	Karbalaa
12:30 GMT	Karrar Saleh 52'			Stadium: Karbala Stadium

5 August 2013 31	Al-Mina'a	3–0	Kirkuk	Basra
11:30 GMT			(Penalty for no show)	Stadium: Az-Zubair Olympic Stadium

18 August 2013 32	Dohuk	1–0	Al-Mina'a	Dohuk
12:30 GMT	Alaa Abdul-Zahra 5'			Stadium: Duhok Stadium

31 August 2013 33	Al-Mina'a	2–1	Al-Amana	Basra
11:30 GMT	Nawaf Falah 16', 28'		Mustafa Ahmed 77'	Stadium: Az-Zubair Olympic Stadium

4 September 2013 34	Al-Zawraa	0–0	Al-Mina'a	Baghdad
12:00 GMT				Stadium: Al Zawraa Stadium

=== Summary table ===
Overall								Home						Away					
Pld	W	D	L	GF	GA	GD	Pts	W	D	L	GF	GA	GD	W	D	L	GF	GA	GD
34	15	7	12	54	48	+6	52	8	4	5	28	21	+7	7	3	7	26	27	−1

Last updated: 4 September 2013.
Source: Goalzz.com

== Top scorers ==
#	Name	Goals
1	Nasser Talla Dahilan	9
2	Hassan Hamoud	8
3	Claude Gnakpa	6
4	Hamid Mido	5
5	Nawaf Falah	4
6	Ahmed Sadeq	3
7	Alaa Al-Sasi	3
8	Ali Hosni	3
9	Ahmed Shershab	2
10	Mohammed Jabbar Rubat	2
11	Faisal Kadhim	2
12	Anas Jassim	1
13	Haider Sari	1
14	Hussein Mohsin	1

== Sources ==
- Iraqi League 2012/2013
- Al-Minaa SC: Transfers and News
- Iraqia Sport TV
