= 2013–14 Al-Mina'a SC season =

Al-Mina'a SC
2013–14 season
- Chairman: Omran Radhi Thani
- Manager: Jamal Ali (until 1 January); Ammar Hussein (1 Jan–11 May); Hassan Mawla (from 11 May)
- Ground: Al-Zubair Stadium (temporary use)
- Iraqi Premier League: 11th
- Top goalscorer: Ali Hosni; Bassim Ali (5 goals)
Home colours	Away colours

The 2013–14 season will be Al-Minaa's 38th season in the Iraqi Premier League, having featured in all 40 editions of the competition except two.

== Squad ==
Note: Flags indicate national team as defined under FIFA eligibility rules; some limited exceptions apply. Players may hold more than one non-FIFA nationality.

No.	Pos.	Nation	Player
2	DF	IRQ	Hamza Adnan
3	DF	IRQ	Safaa Hussein
4	DF	IRQ	Jassim Faisal
5	MF	IRQ	Ahmed Mohsin Ashour
6	MF	IRQ	Omar Alaa Ahmed (Captain)
7	FW	IRQ	Mohammed Jabbar Shokan
8	MF	IRQ	Ali Hosni
10	FW	IRQ	Bassim Ali
11	MF	IRQ	Nayef Falah
14	MF	IRQ	Ali Qasim
15	DF	YEM	Ahmed Sadeq
18	MF	IRQ	Hassan Hamoud

No.	Pos.	Nation	Player
19	FW	IRQ	Hussein Ali Wahed
20	GK	IRQ	Karrar Ibrahim (vice-captain)
21	GK	IRQ	Amjad Rahim
23	DF	IRQ	Mohammed Jabbar Rubat
26	DF	IRQ	Mohammed Abdul Karim
27	MF	IRQ	Hussein Abdul Wahed
29	FW	BFA	Saidou Sandaogo
30	MF	SYR	Hamid Mido
31	DF	IRQ	Hussein Falah
32	DF	IRQ	Haidar Sari
33	MF	IRQ	Anas Jassim
35	DF	IRQ	Abdullah Mohsin

== Transfers ==
=== In ===
Date	Pos.	Name	From	Fee
September 2013	FW	(Iraq) Bassim Ali	(Iraq) Naft Al-Janoob	–
September 2013	FW	(Iraq) Mohammed Jabbar Shokan	(Iraq) Al-Quwa Al-Jawiya	–
September 2013	FW	(Iraq) Hussein Ali Wahed	(Iraq) Al-Naft	–
October 2013	DF	(Iraq) Mohammed Abdul Karim	(Iraq) Naft Al-Janoob	–
October 2013	FW	(Egypt) Reda El-Weshi	(Iraq) Al-Quwa Al-Jawiya	–
November 2013	MF	(Iraq) Ali Qasim	Youth system	–
November 2013	DF	(Armenia) Rafael Safaryan	(Poland) Calisia Kalisz	–
December 2013	FW	(Burkina Faso) Saidou Sandaogo	(Algeria) MC Oran	–
February 2014	DF	(Iraq) Hussein Falah	(Iraq) Dohuk	–

=== Out ===
Date	Pos.	Name	To	Fee
September 2013	FW	(France) Claude Gnakpa	(India) Salgaocar	–
September 2013	FW	(Yemen) Alaa Al-Sasi	(Yemen) Al-Hilal Al-Sahili	–
September 2013	MF	(Iraq) Nawaf Falah	(Iraq) Naft Al-Janoob	–
September 2013	FW	(Iraq) Ahmed Shershab	(Iraq) Najaf	–
September 2013	GK	(Iraq) Salam Matleb	(Iraq) Al-Diwaniya	–
October 2013	MF	(Iraq) Faisal Kadhim	(Iraq) Naft Al-Janoob	–
October 2013	FW	(Iraq) Nasser Talla Dahilan	(Iraq) Naft Maysan	–
October 2013	MF	(Iraq) Salam Mohsin	(Iraq) Naft Al-Janoob	–
October 2013	MF	(Iraq) Hussein Mohsin	Retired	
November 2013	FW	(Egypt) Reda El-Weshi	Released	–
November 2013	DF	(Armenia) Rafael Safaryan	Released	–
March 2014	FW	(Burkina Faso) Saidou Sandaogo	Released	–

Updated to match played March 2014
Source: Al-Minaa SC: Transfers and News

== Technical staff ==
Position	Name
Coach	(Iraq) Jamal Ali
Assistant coach	(Iraq) Abbas Obeid
Assistant coach	(Iraq) Ammar Hussein
Fitness coach	(Iraq) Ali Lafta
Goalkeeping coach	(Iraq) Aqeel Abdul Muhsin
Club doctor	(Iraq) Abdul Abbas Jabbar

Updated to match played January 2014
Source: Al-Minaa SC: Transfers and News

== Board members ==
President	(Iraq) Omran Radhi Thani
Vice President	(Iraq) Jalil Hanoon
Amanuensis	(Iraq) Mohammad Jaber Hassan
Board of Directors Member	(Iraq) Naji Abdulla Hassan Al Mosawi
Board of Directors Member	(Iraq) Nazar Taha Humood
Board of Directors Member	(Iraq) Nabeel Abdul Ameer Jamil
Board of Directors Member	(Iraq) Ali Fadhel Hassan
Board of Directors Member	(Iraq) Karim Jassim Hassan
Female Board Member	(Iraq) Ikhlas Naji Jasim

Updated to match played 11 December 2012
Source: Al-Mina'a SC

== Club ==
=== Kits ===
Supplier: Uhlsport

Home	Home alt.	Away	Away alt.

== Stadium ==
During the previous season, the stadium of Al-Mina'a demolished. A company will build a new stadium that will be completed in 2015. Since they can't play their games at Al Mina'a Stadium, they will be playing at Al-Zubair Stadium during this season.

== Friendlies ==
=== Opening of Basra Sports City ===
12 October 2013 Friendly	Al-Mina'a (Iraq)	1–3	(Lebanon) Al Ahed	Basra, Iraq
13:00 GMT	Nayef Falah 11'		Hassan Jalal 28'; Hussein Ali 35'; Mahdi Hassan 83'	Stadium: Basra Sports City; Attendance: 50,000; Referee: Salem Amer

== Premier League ==
=== League table ===
Pos	Team	Pld	W	D	L	GF	GA	GD	Pts
9	Al-Naft	23	8	6	9	26	27	−1	30
10	Zakho	21	8	5	8	21	26	−5	29
11	Al-Minaa	23	6	10	7	26	27	−1	28
12	Al-Karkh	22	7	4	11	20	25	−5	25
13	Naft Maysan	21	6	6	9	25	29	−4	24

Source: Goalzz
Rules for classification: 1) points; 2) goal difference; 3) number of goals scored.

=== Summary table ===
Overall								Home						Away					
Pld	W	D	L	GF	GA	GD	Pts	W	D	L	GF	GA	GD	W	D	L	GF	GA	GD
23	6	10	7	26	27	−1	28	4	6	2	15	12	+3	2	4	5	11	15	−4

Last updated: 10 June 2014.
Source: Goalzz.com

=== Matches ===
29 October 2013 1	Al-Mina'a	0–0	Naft Al-Janoob	Basra
12:00 GMT				Stadium: Az-Zubair Olympic Stadium

3 November 2013 2	Al-Amana	1–0	Al-Mina'a	Baghdad
12:00 GMT	Ameer Sabah 21'			Stadium: Baghdad Stadium

8 November 2013 3	Masafi Al-Wasat	1–2	Al-Mina'a	Baghdad
12:00 GMT	Azher Taher 6'		Ali Hosni 69'; Ahmed Sadeq 90'	Stadium: Al-Masafi Stadium

23 November 2013 4	Al-Mina'a	1–0	Al-Zawraa	Basra
11:30 GMT	Anas Jasim 30'			Stadium: Az-Zubair Olympic Stadium

28 November 2013 5	Naft Maysan	2–2	Al-Mina'a	Amarah
11:30 GMT	Sahel Naeem 11' (pen.); Sabah Abdul Hassan 28'		Hamid Mido 31'; Hassan Hamoud 72'	Stadium: Al-Maimuna Stadium

4 December 2013 6	Al-Mina'a	2–4	Al-Talaba	Basra
11:30 GMT	Mohammed Jabbar Showkan 44'; Bassim Ali 79'		Ali Salah 24', 53'; Karrar Jasim 39'; Adnan Atiya 51'	Stadium: Az-Zubair Olympic Stadium

9 December 2013 7	Al Shorta	1–1	Al-Mina'a	Baghdad
11:30 GMT	Mustafa Kareem 44' (pen.)		Bassim Ali 88'	Stadium: Al Shorta Stadium

16 December 2013 8	Al-Mina'a	2–2	Dohuk	Basra
11:30 GMT	Bassim Ali 15', 63'		Mathio Imbuta 65', 75'	Stadium: Az-Zubair Olympic Stadium

28 December 2013 9	Al-Karkh	2–1	Al-Mina'a	Baghdad
11:30 GMT	Ali Abed Thiab 75', 89'		Anas Jasim 23'	Stadium: Al Karkh Stadium

2 February 2014 10	Al-Mina'a	3–1	Najaf	Basra
12:00 GMT	Hamid Mido 20'; Bassim Ali 55'; Ali Hosni 81'		Taher Hameed 88'	Stadium: Az-Zubair Olympic Stadium

7 February 2014 11	Al-Mina'a	0–0	Zakho	Basra
12:00 GMT				Stadium: Az-Zubair Olympic Stadium

13 February 2014 12	Al-Quwa Al-Jawiya	1–0	Al-Mina'a	Baghdad
14:00 GMT	Hammadi Ahmad 28'			Stadium: Al-Quwa Al-Jawiya Stadium

24 February 2014 13	Al-Mina'a	3–1	Karbalaa	Basra
12:00 GMT	Ahmed Sadeq 30'; Hussein Ali Wahed 43'; Ali Hosni 48'		Claiton 56'	Stadium: Az-Zubair Olympic Stadium

8 March 2014 14	Erbil	1–1	Al-Mina'a	Erbil
12:30 GMT	Luay Salah 79'		Ali Hosni 90'	Stadium: Franso Hariri Stadium

15 March 2014 15	Al-Mina'a	0–1	Al-Naft	Basra
11:30 GMT			Faris Hassoon 25' (pen.)	Stadium: Az-Zubair Olympic Stadium

4 April 2014 16	Naft Al-Janoob	0–0	Al-Mina'a	Basra
11:30 GMT				Stadium: Naft Al-Janoob Stadium

11 April 2014 17	Al-Mina'a	1–1	Al-Amana	Basra
11:30 GMT	Hussein Ali Wahed 61'		Qusay Habib 74'	Stadium: Az-Zubair Olympic Stadium

5 May 2014 18	Al-Mina'a	2–1	Masafi Al-Wasat	Basra
11:30 GMT	Hamid Mido 15'; Hussein Ali Wahed 53'		Haider Salim Henry 35'	Stadium: Az-Zubair Olympic Stadium

11 May 2014 19	Al-Zawraa	3–0	Al-Mina'a	Baghdad
12:30 GMT	Rahim Olabi 2'; Hussein Jwayed 55'; Mohammad Khalid 79'			Stadium: Al Zawraa Stadium

18 May 2014 20	Al-Mina'a	1–1	Naft Maysan	Basra
11:30 GMT	Naif Falah 15'		Thamir Barghash 58'	Stadium: Az-Zubair Olympic Stadium

28 May 2014 21	Al-Talaba	0–2	Al-Mina'a	Baghdad
12:30 GMT			Hussein Ali Wahed 67'; Ahmed Mohsin 87'	Stadium: Al-Shaab Stadium

6 June 2014 22	Al-Mina'a	0–0	Al Shorta	Basra
11:30 GMT				Stadium: Az-Zubair Olympic Stadium

10 June 2014 23	Dohuk	3–2	Al-Mina'a	Duhok
11:30 GMT	Mohannad Abdul-Raheem 67', 80'; Ahmed Abdul Ameer 85'		Ali Hosni 26'; Hamid Mido 66'	Stadium: Duhok Stadium

18 June 2014 24	Al-Mina'a	v	Al-Karkh	Basra

24 June 2014 25	Najaf	v	Al-Mina'a	Najaf

29 June 2014 26	Zakho	v	Al-Mina'a	Zakho

3 July 2014 27	Al-Mina'a	v	Al-Quwa Al-Jawiya	Basra

10 July 2014 28	Karbalaa	v	Al-Mina'a	Karbala

16 July 2014 29	Al-Mina'a	v	Erbil	Basra

22 July 2014 30	Al-Naft	v	Al-Mina'a	Baghdad

Note: Iraq Football Association has decided to end the league (not canceled) with the adoption of the last position of the standings for the day 18/06/2014 as the final order of the Iraqi League teams.

=== Goalscorers ===
Rank	Pos.	Nationality	No.	Name	Premier League
1	MF	(Iraq)	8	Ali Hosni	5
1	FW	(Iraq)	10	Bassim Ali	5
2	FW	(Iraq)	19	Hussein Ali Wahed	4
2	MF	(Syria)	30	Hamid Mido	4
3	MF	(Iraq)	33	Anas Jassim	2
3	DF	(Yemen)	15	Ahmed Sadeq	2
4	FW	(Iraq)	7	Mohammed Jabbar Shokan	1
4	MF	(Iraq)	5	Ahmed Mohsin Ashour	1
4	MF	(Iraq)	11	Nayef Falah	1
4	MF	(Iraq)	18	Hassan Hamoud	1
Own goals					0
TOTALS					26

Last updated: 10 June 2014

== Sources ==
- Iraqi League 2013/2014
- Al-Minaa SC: Transfers and News
- Iraqia Sport TV
