= 2016 Iraqi Super Cup =

Al-Zawraa	Al-Quwa Al-Jawiya
- Match cancelled
- Venue: Al-Shaab Stadium, Baghdad

The 2016 Iraqi Super Cup was set to be the 8th Iraqi Super Cup and the first edition after it was discontinued in 2002. The Super Cup is an annual Iraqi football match played between the winners of the previous season's Iraqi Premier League and Iraq FA Cup. The match was set to be contested by 2015–16 Iraq FA Cup winners Al-Quwa Al-Jawiya, and Al-Zawraa, champions of the 2015–16 Iraqi Premier League.

It was originally set to be held at Al-Shaab Stadium on 22 August 2016, almost a month before the start of the league season kicked off. However, Al-Quwa Al-Jawiya's matches in the 2016 AFC Cup and Iraq's matches in FIFA World Cup qualifying clashed with this date so the game was postponed to 10 September 2016. Finally, on 9 December 2016, Iraq Football Association member Yahya Karim announced that the match was cancelled altogether.

== Background ==
Al-Zawraa qualified as champions of the 2015–16 Iraqi Premier League. They secured their record 13th title with a 1–1 draw against Al-Naft at Al-Shaab Stadium on 22 May 2016. It would have been their 6th Iraqi Super Cup appearance, having won a record of three titles.

Al-Quwa Al-Jawiya qualified as winners of the 2015–16 Iraq FA Cup. They defeated Al-Zawraa, the league champions, in their last match together 2–0 on 29 May 2016 to win their fourth title. Bashar Resan scored the first goal in the 58th minute and the second was scored by Humam Tariq in stoppage time. It would have been their 5th Iraqi Super Cup appearance, having won two titles. Al-Quwa Al-Jawiya's coach, Basim Qasim would have faced the club he led to achieve last season's league.
