= 2015–16 Iraq FA Cup =

Tournament details
- Country: Iraq
- Dates: 5 October 2015 – 29 May 2016
- Teams: 31

Final positions
- Champions: Al-Quwa Al-Jawiya (4th title)
- Runners-up: Al-Zawraa

Tournament statistics
- Matches played: 37
- Goals scored: 97 (2.62 per match)
- Top goal scorer(s): Luay Salah (6 goals)

The 2015–16 Iraq FA Cup was the 27th edition of the Iraqi knockout football cup as a club competition, the main domestic cup in Iraqi football. It was the second edition held after the 2002–03 edition, although the 2012–13 one was abandoned.

At first, thirty-nine teams were set to participate in the competition, but after the withdrawals of many of the Iraqi Premier League teams, only days before the Round of 32, clubs including Al-Shorta, Al-Talaba, Al-Hudood, Al-Sinaa, Naft Maysan, Al-Najaf, Zakho, and Al-Kahrabaa, a total of twelve teams from the Iraqi Premier League and nineteen from Iraqi First Division League ended up participating. It began on 5 October 2015 and ended on 29 May 2016 with the final at the Al-Shaab Stadium in Baghdad.

The winner of the competition was Al-Quwa Al-Jawiya who won their fourth cup by defeating record winners Al-Zawraa 2–0 in the final. Therefore, they qualified for the 2017 AFC Cup.

== Format ==
=== Participation ===
The cup starts with a qualifying round of the 19 teams from the Iraqi First Division League, 14 of which play against each other and 5 of which automatically proceed to the next round. The 20 (later becoming 12) teams from the Iraqi Premier League join the other teams in the Round of 32.

=== Draw ===
For the first round, the participating teams will be split into two pots of 9 teams in one and 10 in the other. For the remaining rounds other than the final, the draw will be conducted from just one pot. The final is held in the Al-Shaab Stadium, a nominally neutral venue.

=== Match rules ===
Teams meet in one game in the first round, round of 32 and round of 16. In the quarterfinals and semifinals, the teams will have two-legged ties. The final will have only one-leg. A match will take place for 90 minutes, with two halves of 45 minutes. If still tied after regulation or tied on aggregate, the match will be decided by a penalty shootout. A coin toss will decide who takes the first penalty.

=== Cards ===
If a player receives a second yellow card, they will be banned from the next cup match. If a player receives a red card, they will be banned a minimum of one match, but more can be added by the Iraq Football Association.

== Participating clubs ==
The following 31 teams participated in the competition:

**Iraqi Premier League**; 12 clubs from the 2015–16 season	**Iraqi First Division League**; 19 clubs from the 2015–16 season
**Al-Quwa Al-Jawiya**; Al-Zawraa; Duhok; Naft Al-Junoob; Al-Karkh; Amanat Baghdad; Karbala; Al-Samawa; Al-Minaa; Al-Naft; Naft Al-Wasat; Erbil	Al-Oloom wal-Technologia; Al-Jaish; Al-Kufa; Diyala; Ghaz Al-Shamal; Al-Etisalat; Al-Khutoot; Al-Hussein; Al-Difaa Al-Madani; Al-Mahmoudiya; Al-Najda; Al-Qasim; Al-Sadda; Al-Saha; Al-Sulaikh; Balad; Kara; Qazaniya; Shahraban

- **Bold** indicates the team is still in the competition.
- Al-Shorta, Al-Talaba, Al-Hudood, Al-Sinaa, Naft Maysan, Al-Najaf, Zakho, and Al-Kahrabaa withdrew from the competition on 10 November 2015.

=== Map ===
Locations of the 2015–16 Iraq FA Cup clubs

Baghdad teams	Duhok teams	Basra teams
Al-Zawraa; Amanat Baghdad; Al-Naft; Al-Oloom wal-Technologia; Al-Etisalat; Al-Jaish; Al-Karkh; Al-Quwa Al-Jawiya; Al-Difaa Al-Madani; Al-Hussein; Al-Khutoot; Al-Mahmoudiya; Al-Najda; Al-Saha; Al-Sulaikh	Duhok; Kara	Al-Minaa; Naft Al-Junoob

== Schedule ==
The rounds of the 2015–16 competition are scheduled as follows:

Round	Draw date and time	Matches dates
First round	1 September 2015	5–6 October 2015
Round of 32	4 November 2015	10–12 November 2015
Round of 16	4 November 2015	16–17 November 2015
Quarter-finals	15 December 2015	19 December 2015 – 2 January 2016
Semi-finals	21 December 2015	9–16 January 2016
Final	4 April 2016	29 May 2016

== First round ==
The first round was drawn on 1 September 2015 at 12:00 in the Iraq Football Association building in Baghdad by the director of the competitions committee Shihab Ahmed. The matches took place from 5–6 October 2015.

Diyala, Al-Sulaikh, Al-Saha, Balad, and Al-Kufa gained automatic qualification to the Round of 32.

5 October 2015	Al-Khutoot	3–1	Ghaz Al-Shamal	Baghdad
15:00	Radhi; Qasim; Saad		Goal	Stadium: Amanat Baghdad Stadium

5 October 2015	Al-Jaish	0–0 (a.e.t.) (W–L p)	Al-Najda	Baghdad
				Stadium: Al-Jaish Stadium

5 October 2015	Al-Difaa Al-Madani	1–1 (a.e.t.) (5–4 p)	Al-Mahmoudiya	Baghdad
14:30	Goal		Goal	Stadium: Haifa Stadium; Referee: Alaa Jawad

5 October 2015	Al-Oloom wal-Technologia	0–1	Shahraban	Miqdadiya
14:00			Fuad	Stadium: Shahraban Stadium

6 October 2015	Al-Etisalat	1–2	Al-Hussein	Baghdad
	93'		Arzij; Abu Shaiba

6 October 2015	Qazaniya	1–2	Kara	Mandali
	Goal		Ismail; Khalaf

6 October 2015	Al-Sadda	1–1 (a.e.t.) (L–W p)	Al-Qasim	Hilla
15:00	Goal		Goal	Stadium: Babil Stadium

== Final phase ==
=== Bracket ===
Round of 32; 10–12 November 2015
Al-Samawa (w/o)	3
Al-Qasim	0
Al-Kufa	1
Amanat Baghdad (a.e.t.)	2
Al-Hussein	2
Al-Minaa	1
Al-Zawraa	2
Al-Difaa Al-Madani	0
Diyala (p)	2 (5)
Kara	2 (4)
Al-Sulaikh	0
Karbala	1
Al-Naft	4
Shahraban	0
Al-Karkh	2
Erbil	1

Round of 16; 16–17 November 2015
Naft Al-Junoob	1
Al-Samawa	0
Al-Saha	0
Amanat Baghdad	1
Al-Hussein	3
Balad	0
Al-Zawraa	4
Diyala	0
Al-Khutoot	1
Karbala	0
Duhok	2
Al-Naft	1
Naft Al-Wasat	0
Al-Karkh	2
Al-Jaish	1
Al-Quwa Al-Jawiya	3

Quarter-finals; 19 December 2015 – 2 January 2016
Naft Al-Junoob	3	3	6
Amanat Baghdad	2	1	3
Al-Hussein	2	1	3
Al-Zawraa	1	3	4
Al-Khutoot	0	2	2
Duhok	1	2	3
Al-Karkh	1	0	1
Al-Quwa Al-Jawiya	1	1	2

Semi-finals; 9–16 January 2016
Naft Al-Junoob	0	1	1
Al-Zawraa	2	2	4
Duhok	4	0	4
Al-Quwa Al-Jawiya (a)	1	3	4

Final; 29 May 2016
Al-Zawraa	0
Al-Quwa Al-Jawiya	2

== Round of 32 ==
The Round of 32 and the Round of 16 were drawn on 4 November 2015 at 12:00 in the Iraq Football Association building in Baghdad by the director of the competitions committee Shihab Ahmed. The matches took place from 10–12 November 2015.

Al-Khutoot, Naft Al-Junoob, Naft Al-Wasat, Al-Saha, Al-Quwa Al-Jawiya, Al-Jaish, Balad, and Duhok gained automatic qualification to the Round of 16 after the withdrawals of their respective opponents: Al-Shorta, Al-Talaba, Al-Hudood, Al-Sinaa, Naft Maysan, Al-Najaf, Zakho, and Al-Kahrabaa in the Round of 32.

10 November 2015	Al-Zawraa	2–0	Al-Difaa Al-Madani	Baghdad
13:30	Salah 10'; Jaffal 31'			Stadium: Al-Sinaa Stadium

11 November 2015	Al-Hussein	2–1	Al-Minaa	Baghdad
13:30	Taha; Sabri		Sharif 21'	Stadium: Al-Thawra Stadium

11 November 2015	Diyala	2–2 (a.e.t.) (5–4 p)	Kara	Baquba
13:30	Goal		Goal	Stadium: Hibhib Stadium

11 November 2015	Al-Samawa	3–0 (w/o)	Al-Qasim	Samawa
13:30	Slal; Hussein; Mutha'		Goal	Stadium: Al-Samawa Stadium
Note: Al-Qasim withdrew at half-time with the score at 3–1, therefore the match was awarded as a 3–0 win for Al-Samawa.

11 November 2015	Al-Kufa	1–2 (a.e.t.)	Amanat Baghdad	Najaf
13:30	27'		Ahmad 85'; Falah 108'	Stadium: Al-Kufa Stadium

12 November 2015	Al-Karkh	2–1	Erbil	Baghdad
13:30	Majid 36'; Saad 47'		Mustafa 88'	Stadium: Al-Karkh Stadium

12 November 2015	Al-Naft	4–0	Shahraban	Baghdad
13:30	Raad; Ubaid; Ayid; Qasim			Stadium: Al-Naft Stadium

12 November 2015	Al-Sulaikh	0–1	Karbala	Baghdad
13:30			Abu Shama 89'	Stadium: Al-Tahaddi Stadium

== Round of 16 ==
Round of 16 matches took place from 16–17 November 2015.

16 November 2015	Al-Zawraa	4–0	Diyala	Baghdad
13:30	Salah; Hatem Zaidan			Stadium: Al-Sinaa Stadium

16 November 2015	Naft Al-Junoob	1–0	Al-Samawa	Basra
13:30	Ali			Stadium: Al Fayhaa Stadium

16 November 2015	Al-Hussein	3–0	Balad	Baghdad
13:30	Abd Ali; Taha; Ziyad			Stadium: Five Thousand Stadium

16 November 2015	Al-Saha	0–1	Amanat Baghdad	Baghdad
13:30			Abbas	Stadium: Al-Saha Stadium

17 November 2015	Al-Jaish	1–3	Al-Quwa Al-Jawiya	Baghdad
13:30	Ghafil		Mohsin; Mido	Stadium: Al-Jaish Stadium

17 November 2015	Naft Al-Wasat	0–2	Al-Karkh	Najaf
13:30			Saad; Majid	Stadium: Al-Najaf Stadium

17 November 2015	Duhok	2–1	Al-Naft	Duhok
13:30	Mushir 28' (pen.); Ismail 74'		Mshari 64'	Stadium: Duhok Stadium

17 November 2015	Al-Khutoot	1–0	Karbala	Baghdad
13:30	Goal			Stadium: Al-Karkh Stadium

== Quarter-finals ==
The draw for the quarterfinals was held on 15 December 2015 at 12:00 in the Iraq Football Association building in Baghdad by the director of the competitions committee Shihab Ahmed. The matches took place from 19–27 December 2015.

19 December 2015
14:00

Al-Khutoot	0–1	Duhok
		Mushir 45'

University of Baghdad Stadium, Baghdad
27 December 2015
14:00

Duhok	2–2	Al-Khutoot
Khalid 52'; Mushir 89' (pen.)		Karim 34'; Saad 40' (pen.)

Duhok Stadium, Duhok

Duhok won 3–2 on aggregate.

22 December 2015
14:00

Naft Al-Junoob	3–2	Amanat Baghdad
Mubarak 3'; Abdel-Salam 45'; Kadhim 74'	Report	Mohammed 20' (pen.); Amado 65'

Naft Al-Junoob Stadium, Basra
27 December 2015
14:00

Amanat Baghdad	1–3	Naft Al-Junoob
Nasr-Allah 49'		Salam 24'; Awdah 76'; Jawad 88'

Amanat Baghdad Stadium, Baghdad

Naft Al-Junoob won 6–3 on aggregate.

22 December 2015
14:00

Al-Hussein	2–1	Al-Zawraa
Kareem 65'; Raad 89'	Report	Abdul-Zahra 74'

Five Thousand Stadium, Baghdad
28 December 2015
13:30

Al-Zawraa	3–1	Al-Hussein
Jafal (pen.); Salah; Zaidan		Taha

Al-Sinaa Stadium, Baghdad

Al-Zawraa won 4–3 on aggregate.

27 December 2015
14:00

Al-Quwa Al-Jawiya	1–1	Al-Karkh
Abdulwahid 65'		Backer 43'

Al-Quwa Al-Jawiya Stadium, Baghdad
2 January 2016
13:30

Al-Karkh	0–1	Al-Quwa Al-Jawiya
		Mohsin 48'

Al-Karkh Stadium, Baghdad

Al-Quwa Al-Jawiya won 2–1 on aggregate.

== Semi-finals ==
9 January 2016
14:00

Naft Al-Junoob	0–2	Al-Zawraa
	Report	Salah 42'; Ali 76'

Naft Al-Junoob Stadium, Basra
15 January 2016
14:30

Al-Zawraa	2–1	Naft Al-Junoob
Abdul-Zahra 31', 63'	Report	Awda 87'

Al-Sinaa Stadium, Baghdad

Al-Zawraa won 4–1 on aggregate.

9 January 2016
14:00

Duhok	4–1	Al-Quwa Al-Jawiya
Ibrahim 10'; Al Douni 30'; Mushir 62' (pen.); Mamoun 79'	Report	Hassan 25'

Duhok Stadium, Duhok
Referee: Nozad Salih
16 January 2016
13:30

Al-Quwa Al-Jawiya	3–0	Duhok
Mohsin 17'; Ahmed 34'; Wahid 58'	Report

Al-Quwa Al-Jawiya Stadium, Baghdad

4–4 on aggregate. Al-Quwa Al-Jawiya won on away goals.

== Final ==
29 May 2016
18:15

Al-Zawraa	0–2	Al-Quwa Al-Jawiya
		Resan 58'; Tariq 90+4'; Saeed (yellow card) 89' (yellow-red card) 90+6'

Al-Shaab Stadium, Baghdad

Iraq FA Cup
2015–16 winner
Al-Quwa Al-Jawiya
4th title

== Broadcasting rights ==
The broadcasting rights were bought by Ishtar Cinema Production Co. Ltd from the Iraq Football Association for five seasons in the start of the 2015–16 season. Al-Iraqiya Sport signed a protocol with the company to televise the FA Cup and the Iraqi Premier League matches. From the first round until the second legs of the semifinals, no channel was interested in buying the FA Cup matches' rights. On 10 January 2016, Al-Iraqiya Sport bought the rights of the last three games of the competition. However, the administrative board of Al-Quwa Al-Jawiya refused to televise their match against Duhok on live TV. On 4 April, the director of the production company, Mohammed Haijal, announced that the broadcasting rights of the final were given to Al-Kass Sports Channel.

Round	Live TV games
Al-Iraqiya Sport Channel
Semifinals	Al-Zawraa vs Naft Al-Junoob
beIN Sports Al-Kass Sports Channel Al-Iraqiya Sport Channel
Final	Al-Quwa Al-Jawiya vs Al-Zawraa
