= 2016 Iraq FA Cup final =

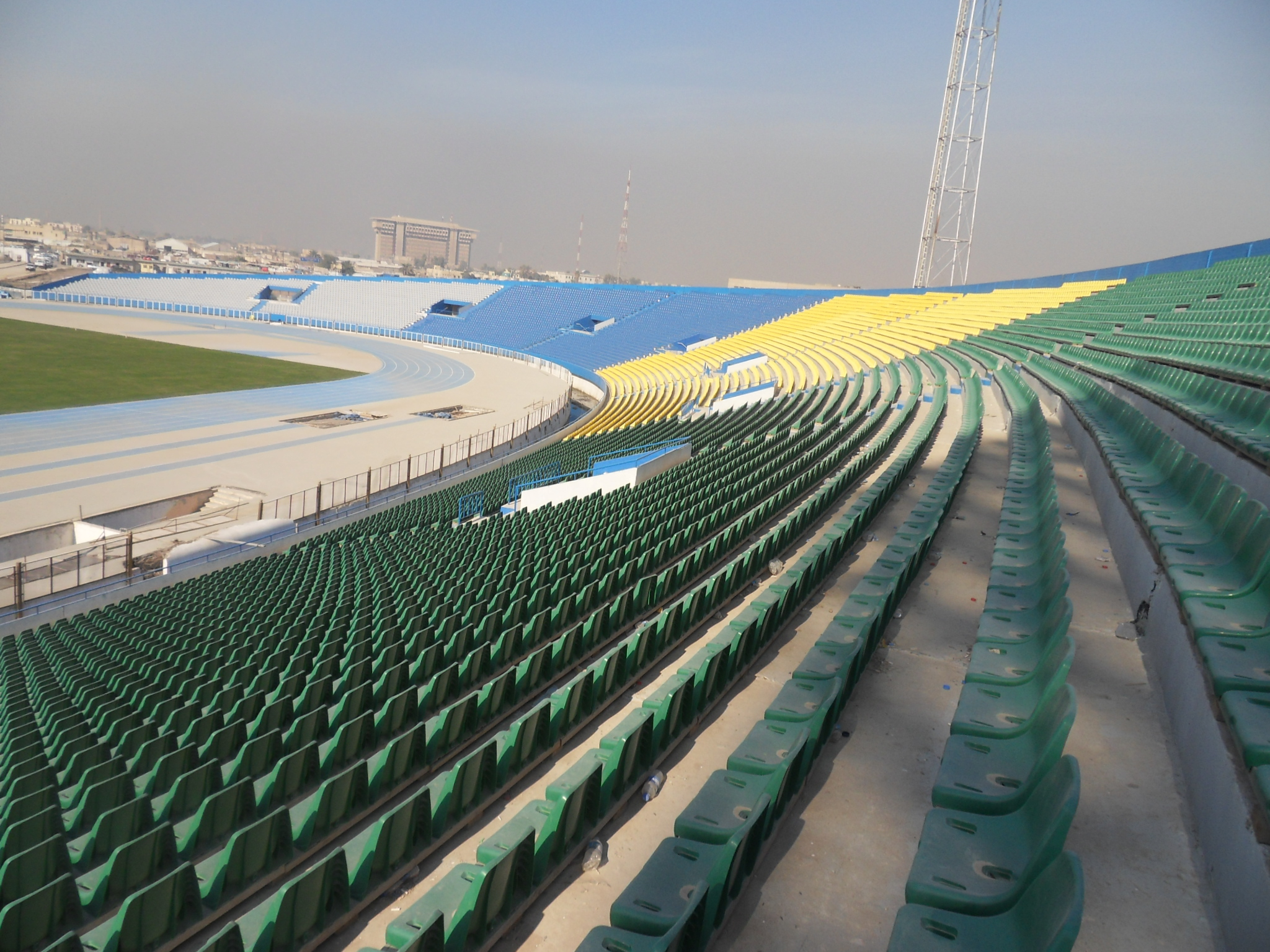
- The match took place at Al-Shaab Stadium
- Event: 2015–16 Iraq FA Cup
Al-Zawraa	Al-Quwa Al-Jawiya
0	2
- Date: 29 May 2016
- Venue: Al-Shaab Stadium, Baghdad
- Referee: Haitham Mohammed

The 2016 Iraq FA Cup final was the 25th final of the Iraq FA Cup as a club competition. The match was contested between the Baghdad rivals, Al-Zawraa and Al-Quwa Al-Jawiya, at Al-Shaab Stadium in Baghdad. It was played on 29 May 2016 to be the final match of the competition. Al-Quwa Al-Jawiya made their 7th appearance in the Iraq FA Cup final while Al-Zawraa extended their record to 16 final appearances. Al-Quwa Al-Jawiya won the match 2–0 with goals from Bashar Resan and Humam Tariq, for the club's 4th title.

The winners of the cup, Al-Quwa Al-Jawiya, qualified for the 2017 AFC Cup. Al-Quwa Al-Jawiya were also set to face the winners of the league, Al-Zawraa, in the 2016 Iraqi Super Cup, but it was eventually cancelled.

== Background ==
Al-Zawraa played in a record 16th Iraq FA Cup final. They had previously won a record 14 finals, most recently in the 2000 Iraq FA Cup final against the same team that they will be facing this final, Al-Quwa Al-Jawiya, with a 4–3 penalty shoot-out win after a 0–0 draw. Their only prior loss in the final was in 1988, losing 4–3 by a penalty shoot-out, after a 1–1 draw, against Al-Rasheed.

Al-Quwa Al-Jawiya made their 7th appearance in the Iraq FA Cup final, of which they had won three, most recently in 1997 with an 8–7 penalty shoot-out win, after a 1–1 draw, against Al Shorta. Their most recent loss in the final was against Al-Zawraa in 2000.

The two teams faced each other in the fourth round of the final stage of the 2015–16 Iraqi Premier League at Al-Shaab Stadium and in front of more than 30,000 spectators, where Al-Zawraa achieved an important 1–0 win with Alaa Ali Mhawi's 60th-minute goal, leaving Al-Quwa Al-Jawiya with little hopes of winning the league title and moving Al-Zawraa to 2nd place.

Before the game, the Iraq Football Association decided that if the final was to finish as a draw after 90 minutes, the match would go straight to a penalty shootout, with no extra-time played.

== Route to the Final ==
Note: In all results below, the score of the finalist is given first (H: home; A: away).

Al-Zawraa				Round	Al-Quwa Al-Jawiya			
Opponent	Result			2015–16 Iraq FA Cup	Opponent	Result		
Al-Difaa Al-Madani	2–0 (H)			Round of 32	Naft Maysan	Walkover		
Diyala	4–0 (H)			Round of 16	Al-Jaish	3–1 (A)		
Opponent	Agg.	1st leg	2nd leg	Two-legged ties	Opponent	Agg.	1st leg	2nd leg
Al-Hussein	4–3	1–2 (A)	3–1 (H)	Quarter-finals	Al-Karkh	2–1	1–1 (H)	1–0 (A)
Naft Al-Junoob	4–1	2–0 (A)	2–1 (H)	Semi-finals	Duhok	4–4 (a)	1–4 (A)	3–0 (H)

=== Al-Zawraa ===
Al-Zawraa entered the competition in the Round of 32 as an Iraqi Premier League team. In their first match, they were drawn against an Iraqi First Division League team, Al-Difaa Al-Madani home. At their temporary home stadium, Al-Sinaa Stadium, Al-Zawraa won 2–0 with goals from Luay Salah and Oday Jafal. In the Round of 16, they drew another First Division League team, Diyala at Al-Sina'a Stadium, winning 4–0 with a hat-trick from Salah and a goal by Hatem Zaidan. In the quarterfinals they were drawn against another First Division League team, Al-Hussein, where they lost 2–1 away, at the Five Thousand Stadium, in the first leg, with a goal from Alaa Abdul-Zahra. They pulled it back by winning 3–1 home, at Al-Sinaa Stadium, in the second leg, winning 4–3 on aggregate. The goals were from Jafal, Salah and Zaidan. In the semifinals, Al-Zawraa drew Naft Al-Janoob, where they won 2–0 away, at the Naft Al-Junoob Stadium, in the first leg, with goals from Salah and Hussein Ali. They also won, in the second leg, 2–1 at Al-Sinaa Stadium, with two goals from Abdul-Zahra to reach the Iraq FA Cup final.

=== Al-Quwa Al-Jawiya ===
Al-Quwa Al-Jawiya entered the competition in the Round of 32 as an Iraqi Premier League team but due to the withdrawal of Naft Maysan, Al-Quwa Al-Jawiya gained automatic qualification to the Round of 16. They were drawn against an Iraqi First Division League team, Al-Jaish away. At Al-Jaish Stadium, Al-Quwa Al-Jawiya won 3–1 with two goals from Emad Muhsin and a goal by Hamid Mido. In the quarterfinals, they drew against Al-Karkh, where they drew in the first leg 1–1 at Al-Quwa Al-Jawiya Stadium with a goal from Mohammed Abdulwahid. In the second leg, they won 1–0 with a goal from Muhsin at Al-Karkh Stadium. In the semifinals, they drew Duhok, where they lost 4–1 in the first leg, at the Duhok Stadium, with a goal from Abdulwahid. In the second leg, at Al-Quwa Al-Jawiya Stadium, they pulled it back, winning 3–0 with goals from Muhsin, Hammadi Ahmed and Hussein Ali Wahid to reach to the Iraq FA Cup final on the away goals rule.

== Pre-match ==
Before the match, a retirement ceremony was held for former Al-Zawraa forward Husham Mohammed.

== Match ==
=== Details ===
29 May 2016
18:15 UTC+03:00

Al-Zawraa	0–2	Al-Quwa Al-Jawiya
		Resan 58'; Tariq 90+4'

Al-Shaab Stadium, Baghdad
Referee: Haitham Mohammed

Al-Zawraa	Al-Quwa Al-Jawiya

GK	20	(Iraq) Alaa Gatea
RB	15	(Iraq) Alaa Mhawi
CB	5	(Iraq) Ali Lateef
CB	3	(Syria) Hussein Jwayed
LB	14	(Iraq) Haidar Abdul-Amir (c)
CM	7	(Iraq) Hussein Abdul-Wahed	(yellow card) 67'
CM	16	(Syria) Zaher Midani		(substituted off) 77'
CM	13	(Iraq) Hussein Ali	(yellow card) 79'
RF	8	(Iraq) Mohannad Abdul-Raheem		(substituted off) 61'
LF	10	(Iraq) Alaa Abdul-Zahra
CF	11	(Iraq) Luay Salah		(substituted off) 60'
Substitutions:
FW	30	(Syria) Oday Jafal		(substituted on) 60'
MF	17	(Iraq) Haidar Sabah		(substituted on) 61'
FW	18	(Iraq) Hatem Zaidan		(substituted on) 77'
Manager:
(Iraq) Basim Qasim

GK	1	(Iraq) Fahad Talib
RB	6	(Iraq) Sameh Saeed	(yellow card) 89' (yellow-red card) 90+6'
CB	3	(Iraq) Ali Abdul-Jabbar (c)
CB	2	(Iraq) Samal Saeed	(yellow card) 85'
LB	33	(Syria) Moayad Ajan	(yellow card) 91'
DM	4	(Iraq) Saad Natiq	(yellow card) 56'
RM	11	(Iraq) Humam Tariq	(yellow card) 90+5'
CM	30	(Syria) Hamid Mido		(substituted off) 86'
CM	18	(Ghana) Akwetey Mensah		(substituted off) 21'
LM	13	(Iraq) Bashar Resan		(substituted off) 90+2'
CF	10	(Iraq) Hammadi Ahmed
Substitutions:
MF	20	(Iraq) Mohammed Hassan		(substituted on) 21'
MF	15	(Iraq) Osama Ali		(substituted on) 86'
DF	30	(Iraq) Majid Juwad		(substituted on) 90+2'
Manager:
(Iraq) Ahmed Daham

Assistant referees:
Wathiq Modalil
Jaleel Saifi
Fourth official:
Sabah Abid

Match rules

- 90 minutes.
- Penalty shoot-out if scores still level.
- Seven named substitutes, of which up to three may be used.
