= 2011–12 Al-Mina'a SC season =

Al-Mina'a SC
2011–12 season
- Chairman: Salah Khudhair
- Manager: Younis Al Qattan (until 3 December); Taher Balas (from 11 Dec. until 12 Jan.); Rahim Hameed (from 12 January)
- Ground: Al-Zubair Stadium (temporary use)
- Iraqi Premier League: 11th
- Top goalscorer: League: Mohammed Jabbar Shokan (7); All: Mohammed Jabbar Shokan (7)
Home colours	Away colours

The 2011–12 season will be Al-Minaa's 36th season in the Iraqi Premier League, having featured in all 38 editions of the competition except two.

== Squad ==
Note: Flags indicate national team as defined under FIFA eligibility rules; some limited exceptions apply. Players may hold more than one non-FIFA nationality.

No.	Pos.	Nation	Player
1	GK	IRQ	Saddam Salman
2	DF	IRQ	Safaa Jabbar
3	DF	IRQ	Safaa Hussein
4	DF	IRQ	Jassim Faisal
5	MF	IRQ	Bashar Hadi Ahmed
6	MF	IRQ	Omar Alaa Ahmed
7	FW	IRQ	Mohammed Jabbar Shokan
8	FW	IRQ	Sultan Jassim
9	MF	IRQ	Ammar Abdul Hussein
10	FW	IRQ	Ehsan Hadi
11	MF	IRQ	Nayef Falah
14	DF	IRQ	Hassan Chasib
17	MF	IRQ	Faisal Kadhim

No.	Pos.	Nation	Player
19	MF	IRQ	Mohammed Ghazi
20	GK	IRQ	Karrar Ibrahim
21	DF	IRQ	Sajjad Abdul Kadhim
22	GK	IRQ	Salam Matlab
23	MF	IRQ	Mohammed Jabbar Rubat
25	DF	IRQ	Hussein Mohsen
26	MF	IRQ	Hassan Hadi Ahmed
27	MF	IRQ	Amjad Hameed
30	DF	IRQ	Anas Jassim
31	DF	IRQ	Ali Jassim
44	DF	IRQ	Haider Abdul Hussein
99	FW	IRQ	Mohammed Nasser (Captain)

=== Out on loan ===
Note: Flags indicate national team as defined under FIFA eligibility rules; some limited exceptions apply. Players may hold more than one non-FIFA nationality.

No.	Pos.	Nation	Player
15	DF	IRQ	Mohammed Adnan (on loan at Al-Quwa Al-Jawiya until the end of the 2011–12 season)

== Transfers ==
=== In ===
Date	Pos.	Name	From	Fee
September 2011	DF	(Iraq) Safaa Jabbar	(Iraq) Al-Diwaniyah	–
October 2011	DF	(Iraq) Ali Jassim	(Iraq) Naft Al-Janoob	–
October 2011	MF	(Iraq) Amjad Hameed	(Iraq) Naft Al-Janoob	–

=== Out ===
Date	Pos.	Name	To	Fee
September 2011	FW	(Iraq) Hussam Ibrahim	(Iraq) Al-Shorta	–

Updated to match played January 2012
Source: Al-Minaa SC: Transfers and News

== Technical staff ==
Position	Name
Coach	(Iraq) Rahim Hameed
Fitness coach	(Iraq) Ali Lafta
Goalkeeping coach	(Iraq) Saddam Salman
Club doctor	(Iraq) Faris Abdullah

Updated to match played January 2012
Source: Al-Minaa SC: Transfers and News

== Board members ==
President	(Iraq) Salah Khudhair Abbood
Vice President	(Iraq) Hadi Ahmed
Second Vice President	(Iraq) Rahim Karim
Amanuensis	(Iraq) Karim Salem Juma
Board of Directors Member	(Iraq) Mohammed Abdul Hussein
Board of Directors Member	(Iraq) Nazar Taha Humood
Board of Directors Member	(Iraq) Nabeel Abdul Ameer Jamil
Board of Directors Member	(Iraq) Ali Fadhel Hassan
Board of Directors Member	(Iraq) Hani Abed Waleed
Board of Directors Member	(Iraq) Najem Abdulla Al Azzawey

Updated to match played 11 December 2008
Source: Al-Minaa SC: Transfers and News

== Stadium ==
During the previous season, the stadium of Al-Mina'a demolished. A company will build a new stadium that will be completed in 2015. Since they can't play their games at Al Mina'a Stadium, they will be playing at Al-Zubair Stadium during this season.

== Matches ==
=== Iraqi Premier League ===
Away matches

5 September 2011 1	Al Karkh	1–1	Al-Mina'a	Baghdad
11:30 GMT	Abdul-Raheem 2'		Adnan 45'	Stadium: Al Karkh Stadium

10 September 2011 2	Al Taji	0–0	Al-Mina'a	Baghdad
11:30 GMT				Stadium: Al Taji Stadium

17 September 2011 3	Al-Mina'a	3–0	Al-Hedood	Basra
11:30 GMT	Ghazi 28'; Shokan 55'; Abdul-Hussein 66'			Stadium: Az-Zubair Olympic Stadium

23 September 2011 4	Kirkuk	1–0	Al-Mina'a	Kirkuk
11:30 GMT	Wattan 65'			Stadium: Kirkuk Stadium

30 September 2011 5	Al-Mina'a	0–3	Dohuk	Basra
11:30 GMT			Burhan Sahyouni 47'; Murad Kurdi 49'; Khalid Musheer 71'	Stadium: Az-Zubair Olympic Stadium

4 December 2011 6	Al-Talaba	1–2	Al-Mina'a	Baghdad
11:30 GMT	Hekmat Rezaij 37'		Anas Jassim 44'; Ammar Abdul Hussein 52'	Stadium: Al Karkh Stadium

14 December 2011 7	Al-Mina'a	0–0	Zakho	Basra
11:30 GMT				Stadium: Az-Zubair Olympic Stadium

20 December 2011 8	Al-Mina'a	1–1	Najaf	Basra
11:30 GMT	Mohammed Jabbar Rubat 11'		Ahmed Shershab 5'	Stadium: Az-Zubair Olympic Stadium

25 December 2011 9	Al-Sinaa	0–0	Al-Mina'a	Baghdad
11:30 GMT				Stadium: Al Sina'a Stadium

30 December 2011 10	Al-Mina'a	0–0	Al-Naft	Basra
11:30 GMT				Stadium: Az-Zubair Olympic Stadium

4 January 2012 11	Al-Masafi	2–0	Al-Mina'a	Baghdad
11:30 GMT	Aqeel Saddam 77'; Mustafa Karim 90+2'			Stadium: Al-Masafi Stadium

18 January 2012 12	Al-Mina'a	1–2	Al-Shorta	Basra
11:30 GMT	Mohammed Jabbar Shokan 80'		Ali Audah 41', 60'	Stadium: Az-Zubair Olympic Stadium

26 January 2012 13	Al Amana	0–1	Al-Mina'a	Baghdad
11:30 GMT			Mohammed Jabbar Shokan 87'	Stadium: Al-Masafi Stadium

2 February 2012 14	Al-Mina'a	2–0	Al Shirqat	Basra
11:30 GMT	Mohammed Jabbar Shokan 36', 66' (pen.)			Stadium: Az-Zubair Olympic Stadium

7 February 2012 15	Al-Kahraba	1–2	Al-Mina'a	Baghdad
11:30 GMT	Jassim Swadi 37' (pen.)		Nayef Falah 66'; Faisal Kadhim 76'	Stadium: Al Naft Stadium

12 February 2012 16	Al-Mina'a	1–4	Erbil	Basra
11:30 GMT	Soltan Jassim 5'		Amjad Radhi 16', 27', 76'; Nadim Sabagh 90+2'	Stadium: Az-Zubair Olympic Stadium

24 February 2012 17	Al-Quwa Al-Jawiya	2–1	Al-Mina'a	Baghdad
11:30 GMT	Hammadi Ahmad 30'; Ahmed Abdul Ameer 36'		Nayef Falah 53'	Stadium: Al-Quwa Al-Jawiya Stadium

28 February 2012 19	Al-Zawraa	2–1	Al-Mina'a	Baghdad
11:30 GMT	Faris Hassan 67'; Mohammed Ahmed 76'		Ammar Abdul Hussein 34'	Stadium: Al Zawraa Stadium

8 March 2012 19	Al-Mina'a	1–0	Karbalaa	Basra
	Mohammed Jabbar Shokan 40'			Stadium: Az-Zubair Olympic Stadium

Home matches

9 April 2012 20	Al-Mina'a	3–0	Al Taji	Basra
11:30 GMT	Soltan Jassim 4'; Anas Jassim 20'; Haider Abdul Hussein 90+3' (pen.)			Stadium: Az-Zubair Olympic Stadium

14 April 2012 21	Al-Mina'a	2–0	Al Karkh	Basra
11:30 GMT	Jassim Faisal 90'; Hussein Mohsin 90+3'			Stadium: Az-Zubair Olympic Stadium

20 April 2012 22	Al-Hedood	0–2	Al-Mina'a	Baghdad
11:30 GMT			Mohammed Jabbar Rubat 11'; Safaa Jabbar 60'	Stadium: Al-Hedood Stadium

26 April 2012 23	Al-Mina'a	3–3	Kirkuk	Basra
11:30 GMT	Ammar Abdul Hussein 7'; Anas Jassim 40', 83'		Ali Aziz 9'; Miran Kareem 30', 51'	Stadium: Az-Zubair Olympic Stadium

2 May 2012 24	Dohuk	3–1	Al-Mina'a	Dohuk
11:30 GMT	Salih Sadir 13', 38'; Hussein Karim 22'		Mohammed Jabbar Rubat 78'	Stadium: Duhok Stadium

12 May 2012 25	Al-Mina'a	2–1	Al-Talaba	Basra
11:30 GMT	Anas Jassim 33' (pen.); Haider Abdul Hussein 90+3'		Thamer Fouad 6'	Stadium: Az-Zubair Olympic Stadium

17 May 2012 26	Zakho	1–0	Al-Mina'a	Zakho
11:30 GMT	Hussein Jawad 50'			Stadium: Zakho Stadium

24 May 2012 27	Najaf	1–1	Al-Mina'a	Najaf
11:30 GMT	Haider Abbodi 63'		Soltan Jassim 41'	Stadium: An Najaf Stadium

1 June 2012 28	Al-Mina'a	0–0	Al-Sinaa	Basra
11:30 GMT				Stadium: Az-Zubair Olympic Stadium

6 June 2012 29	Al-Naft	1–1	Al-Mina'a	Baghdad
11:30 GMT	Ali Mansour 4'		Ammar Abdul Hussein 27'	Stadium: Al Naft Stadium

19 June 2012 30	Al-Mina'a	0–1	Al-Masafi	Basra
11:30 GMT			Murtadha Qasim 28'	Stadium: Az-Zubair Olympic Stadium

24 June 2012 31	Al-Shorta	3–0	Al-Mina'a	Baghdad
11:30 GMT	Amjad Kalaf 72', 90' (pen.); Sherko Karim 74'			Stadium: Al Shorta Stadium

1 July 2012 32	Al-Mina'a	1–0	Al Amana	Basra
11:30 GMT	Anas Jassim 72'			Stadium: Az-Zubair Olympic Stadium

6 July 2012 33	Al Shirqat	1–1	Al-Mina'a	Kirkuk
11:30 GMT	Mohammed Jaffal 65'		Nayef Falah 54'	Stadium: Al Shirqat Stadium

14 July 2012 34	Al-Mina'a	2–3	Al-Kahraba	Basra
11:30 GMT	Hassan Hadi Ahmed 24'; Soltan Jassim 54'		Ahmed Hussein 13', 21'; Fadhel Meqdad 80'	Stadium: Az-Zubair Olympic Stadium

19 July 2012 35	Erbil	3–0	Al-Mina'a	Erbil
11:30 GMT	Abdul Razzak Al Hussein 45'; Saad Abdul-Amir 56'; Mustafa Ahmed 74'			Stadium: Franso Hariri Stadium

1 August 2012 36	Al-Mina'a	2–0	Al-Quwa Al-Jawiya	Basra
11:30 GMT	Haider Abdul Hussein 21'; Mohammed Jabbar Shokan 29'			Stadium: Az-Zubair Olympic Stadium

10 August 2012 37	Al-Mina'a	2–1	Al-Zawraa	Basra
11:30 GMT	Mohammed Nasser .'; Ammar Abdul Hussein .'		Ali Saad .'	Stadium: Az-Zubair Olympic Stadium

16 August 2012 38	Karbalaa	2–0	Al-Mina'a	Karbalaa
11:30 GMT	Hussein Farhood .'; Maytham Hamza .'			Stadium: Karbalaa Stadium

=== Summary table ===
Overall								Home						Away					
Pld	W	D	L	GF	GA	GD	Pts	W	D	L	GF	GA	GD	W	D	L	GF	GA	GD
38	13	11	14	40	44	−4	50	9	5	5	26	19	+7	4	6	9	14	25	−11

Last updated: 16 August 2012.
Source: Goalzz.com

== Top scorers ==
#	Name	Goals
1	Mohammed Jabbar Shokan	7
2	Ammar Abdul Hussein	6
3	Anas Jassim	6
4	Sultan Jassim	4
5	Mohammed Jabbar Rubat	3
6	Nayef Falah	3
7	Haider Abdul Hussein	3
8	Mohammed Adnan	1
9	Mohammed Ghazi	1
10	Faisal Kadhim	1
11	Jassim Faisal	1
12	Hussein Mohsen	1
13	Safaa Jabbar	1
14	Hassan Hadi Ahmed	1
15	Mohammed Nasser	1

== Sources ==
- Iraqi League 2011/2012
- Al-Minaa SC: Transfers and News
- Iraqia Sport TV
