= Samal Saeed =

Iraqi footballer (born 1987)

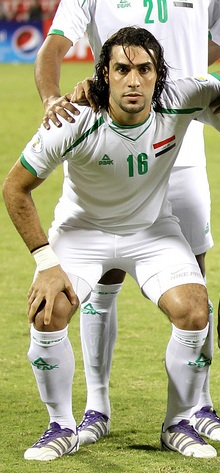

Personal information
- Full name: Samal Saeed Mujbel
- Date of birth: 1 December 1987 (age 38)
- Place of birth: Al-Hilla, Iraq
- Height: 1.82 m (6 ft 0 in)
- Positions: Right back; center back

Team information
- Current team: Al-Diwaniya SC

Senior career*
Years	Team	Apps	(Gls)
2004–2007	Al Shorta	?	(?)
2007–2009	Arbil FC		
2009–2010	Al Shorta		
2010–2011	Najaf FC		
2011–2012	Foolad	24	(1)
2012–2013	Al-Naft		
2013–2014	Al-Talaba		
2014–2018	Al-Quwa Al-Jawiya		
2018–2019	Al-Zawraa		
2019–2021	Al-Talaba		
2021–2022	Naft Al-Wasat		
2022-	Al-Diwaniya SC		

International career^{‡}
2005–2016	Iraq	69	(2)
- * Club domestic league appearances and goals as of 03 May 2016 ‡ National team caps and goals as of 24 August 2016

Samal Saeed Mujbel Al Mamoori (Arabic: سامال سعيد مجبل; born 1 December 1987) is an Iraqi football defender who plays for Al-Diwaniya SC and the Iraq national football team.

== Personal ==
Samal is the twin brother of the Iraqi midfielder Samer Saeed and the older brother of Iraqi defender Sameh Saeed.

== International goals ==
Scores and results list Iraq's goal tally first.

#	Date	Venue	Opponent	Score	Result	Competition
1.	21 September 2010	Amman International Stadium, Amman	Oman	1–1	3–2	International Friendly
2.	25 September 2010	King Abdullah Stadium, Amman	Yemen	1–1	2–1	2010 WAFF Championship

== Honours ==
=== Club ===
Erbil SC

- Iraqi Premier League: 2007–08, 2008–09

Al-Quwa Al-Jawiya

- AFC Cup: 2016, 2017
- Iraq FA Cup: 2015–16
- Iraqi Premier League: 2016–17

=== Country ===
- 2005 West Asian Games Gold medallist.
- 2012 Arab Nations Cup Bronze medallist
- 2012 WAFF Championship: runner-up

=== Individual ===
- 15/16 IPL Center Back of the season
