= Sameh Saeed =

Iraqi footballer

Sameh Saeed Mujbel
Personal information
- Full name: Sameh Saeed Mujbel Al-Mamoori
- Date of birth: 26 May 1992 (age 34)
- Place of birth: Baghdad, Iraq
- Position: Right back

Youth career
- 2010–2013: Baghdad FC

Senior career*
Years	Team	Apps	(Gls)
2012–2015	Baghdad FC	24	(3)
2015–2022	Al-Quwa Al-Jawiya		
2022–2023	Zakho		
2023–2024	Al-Quwa Al-Jawiya		

International career
2014	Iraq U23	1	(0)
2014–2022	Iraq	17	(0)
- * Club domestic league appearances and goals

Sameh Saeed Mujbel Al-Mamoori (Arabic: سامح سعيد مجبل المعموري; born 26 May 1992) is an Iraqi footballer who last played as a right back for Al-Quwa Al-Jawiya in the Iraqi Premier League. He is the younger brother of Samal Saeed and Samer Saeed.

== International career ==
On 4 September 2014 Sameh made his International debut against Peru in a friendly match that ended 2–0 loss.

== Honours ==
=== Club ===
Al-Quwa Al-Jawiya

- Iraqi Premier League: 2016–17, 2020–21
- Iraq FA Cup: 2015–16, 2020–21
- AFC Cup: 2016, 2017, 2018
