= Emad Mohsin =

Iraqi footballer

Personal information
- Full name: Emad Mohsin Majeed
- Date of birth: 3 November 1998 (age 28)
- Place of birth: Baghdad, Iraq
- Height: 1.81 m (5 ft 11 in)
- Position: Forward

Team information
- Current team: Zakho
- Number: 9

Youth career
- 2010–2012: Al-Shorta

Senior career*
| Years | Team | Apps | (Gls) |
| 2012 | Al-Shorta | 1 | (0) |
| 2012–2015 | Al-Karkh | | (7) |
| 2015–2019 | Al-Quwa Al-Jawiya | | (39) |
| 2019 | Al-Zawraa | | |
| 2020 | Al-Hilal Omdurman | 10 | (1) |
| 2020 | Al-Minaa | 9 | (5) |
| 2021–2022 | Al-Karkh SC | | |
| 2022– | Zakho | | |

International career
| 2018– | Iraq | 2 | (1) |
- * Club domestic league appearances and goals as of 28 March 2018

Emad Mohsin Majeed (Arabic: عِمَاد مُحْسِن مَجِيد; born 3 November 1998 in Baghdad, Iraq) is an Iraqi footballer who plays as a centre forward for Al-Minaa.

== Club career ==
Emad started his senior career at Al-Shorta before signing for Al-Karkh where he spent two seasons with club, scoring seven goals. He signed for Al-Quwa Al-Jawiya for the 2015–2016 season, and continued until the 2018–2019 season, he left the team at the end of the season after winning five championships with them and scored 51 goals in all competitions.

Emad signed in 2019 for Al-Zawraa club, but he only played some matches, then he moved to professional with the Sudanese club Al-Hilal. He started his professional career in 2020, where he signed with the Sudanese club Al-Hilal, but he played only ten matches and scored one goal, and he ended his contract with the club and returned to Iraq due to problems with the team coach. On 27 July 2020, he signed for Basra Club Al-Minaa.

== International career ==
On 28 February 2018 Emad played his debut with Iraq against Saudi Arabia in friendly match, scoring his first goal in this match which ended 4-1 for Iraq.

=== Iraq national team goals ===
Scores and results list Iraq's goal tally first.

| # | Date | Venue | Opponent | Score | Result | Competition |
|---|---|---|---|---|---|---|
| 1. | 28 February 2018 | Basra Sports City, Basra | Saudi Arabia | 2–0 | 4–1 | Friendly |

== Honors ==
=== Club ===
Al-Quwa Al-Jawiya

- Iraqi Premier League: 2016–17
- Iraq FA Cup: 2015–16
- AFC Cup: 2016, 2017, 2018
