= Gleisson =

Brazilian footballer (born 1982)

Gleisson Freire
Personal information
- Full name: Gleisson Jorge de Souza Freire
- Date of birth: March 5, 1982 (age 44)
- Place of birth: Rio de Janeiro, Brazil
- Height: 1.86 m (6 ft 1 in)
- Position: Forward

Senior career*
Years	Team	Apps	(Gls)
2003–2004	Danubio		
2004–2005	Salamanca		
2005–2006	DYTO		
2006	Sfaxien		
2006–2007	Asante Kotoko		
2007	Duque de Caxias		
2008	Terengganu		(10)
2009	Mesquita	5	(0)
2009–2010	Kawkab	19	(6)
2011	Madureira		
2013	Atlético Barra		
2014	Duque de Caxias	17	(4)
2014–2016	Al-Mina'a	19	(6)
2017	America	11	(2)
2018	Rio Negro	10	(4)
2019	Nacional de Muriaé	9	(3)
2019	Democrata-SL	5	(0)
2020	São Gonçalo EC	3	(0)
2020	Amazonas	3	(0)
2020	Porto Velho	6	(1)
2021	Humaitá	12	(6)
- * Club domestic league appearances and goals

Gleisson Jorge de Souza Freire (born May 3, 1982), or simply Gleisson, is a Brazilian former professional footballer who played as a forward.
