= Ali Audah =

Indonesian literature author

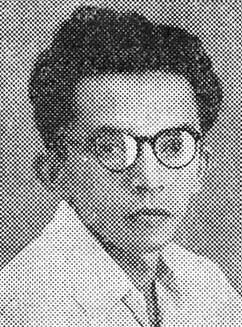
- Audah, c. 1954
- Born: 14 July 1924; Bondowoso, Dutch East Indies
- Died: 20 June 2017 (aged 92); Bogor, West Java, Indonesia

Ali Audah (14 July 1924 – 20 June 2017) was an Indonesian literature writer and translator. He is best known for his translations of Arabic literature works into Indonesian.

== Early life ==
Audah was born in Bondowoso, today in East Java, on 14 July 1924. His father, Salim Audah, died when he was seven, and Audah moved to the suburbs of Surabaya where his mother and older brother worked to sustain the family. Due to this financial situation, Audah only studied until second grade at an Islamic school before dropping out. He was mostly self-taught, studying politics, languages and literature. He worked for some time as a manual laborer in Surabaya and in Bogor during the Japanese occupation and the Indonesian National Revolution before permanently moving to Bogor in 1949.

== Career ==
His writing career began during the Japanese occupation period, when he submitted short stories to a number of magazines without success. In 1946, he won a drama-writing competition in East Java. He began to contribute poetry to literary magazines, and also worked as a freelance journalist for a number of newspapers. In 1953, he suffered from an illness, which forced him to focus on his writing for a living. He gradually became well-known, with his works being submitted to a large number of newspapers based in Jakarta.

Audah began to develop an interest in Arabic literature after one of his siblings lived for a time in the Arabian peninsula. He received a number of Arabic works from his sibling, learned the language, and became a renowned translator. His best-received translation was Abdullah Yusuf Ali's The Holy Qur'an: Text, Translation and Commentary (1934), which became a best-seller in Indonesia. Audah also later learned English, French and German, despite his lack of formal education. Audah took a cautious approach to his translations, often spending hours translating individual words or sentences.

Outside his literature career, he served as head of department for the shari'a faculty at Ibnu Khaldun University, Bogor, lectured humanities at Bogor Agricultural Institute, and chaired the Indonesian Translators' Association between 1974 and 1984. He was also engaged in literature education at Indonesian high schools.

He died in his home in Bogor on 20 June 2017.
