= Bashar Resan =

Iraqi footballer

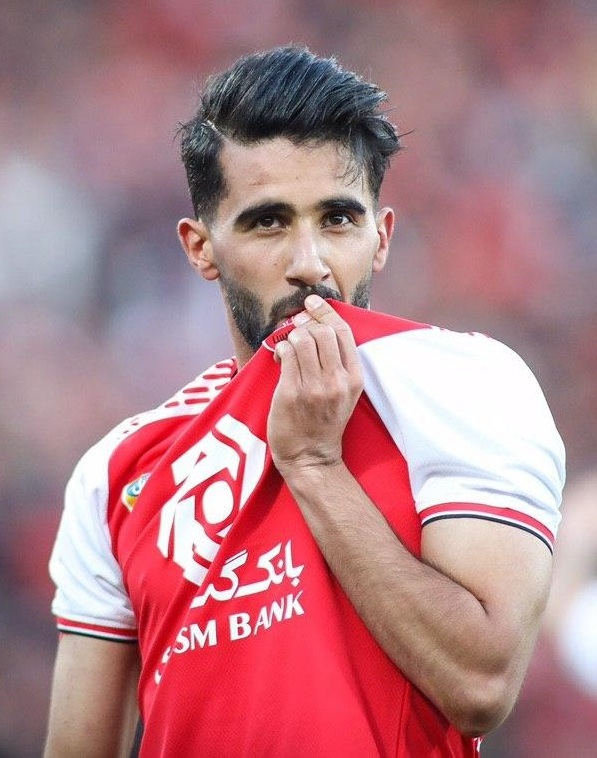
- Resan with Persepolis in 2020

Personal information
- Full name: Bashar Resan Bonyan Albu-Mohammed
- Date of birth: 22 December 1996 (age 29)
- Place of birth: Baghdad, Iraq
- Height: 1.77 m (5 ft 10 in)
- Position: Attacking midfielder

Team information
- Current team: Pakhtakor
- Number: 21

Youth career
- 2007–2009: Ammo Baba School
- 2009–2011: Al-Quwa Al-Jawiya

Senior career*
Years	Team	Apps	(Gls)
2011–2017	Al-Quwa Al-Jawiya		(15)
2017–2021	Persepolis	66	(3)
2021–2024	Qatar SC	60	(7)
2024	→ Al-Markhiya (loan)	5	(0)
2025–	Pakhtakor	38	(8)

International career^{‡}
2011–2013	Iraq U17	8	(3)
2013–2014	Iraq U20	7	(2)
2014–2018	Iraq U23	16	(5)
2014–	Iraq	66	(3)
- * Club domestic league appearances and goals as of 28 July 2026 ‡ National team caps and goals as of 11 October 2025

Bashar Resan Bonyan Albu-Mohammed (Arabic: بشار رسن بنيان; born 22 December 1996) is an Iraqi professional footballer who plays as a midfielder for Pakhtakor, and the Iraq national team.

== Club career ==
=== Early years ===
Bashar is the son of former Iraq and Sikak Al-Hadeed player of the 70s, Resan Bonyan. He started playing on Palestine Street in the Iraqi capital for local team 14 Tammuz and had the privilege of being a student at the Ammo Baba Football School from the age of 12 and spent two years at the school before joining Al-Quwa Al-Jawiya at 13. He first played for the Al-Quwa Al-Jawiya Junior team and in the space of just nine months he found himself in the first team.

=== Al-Quwa Al-Jawiya ===
Rasan started his career at Al-Quwa Al-Jawiya, where he made his league debut in 2011. In the 2010–2011 season he was plucked from the Al-Quwa Al-Jawiya junior side where at 14 was playing with boys much older than himself to train with the first team after he was seen in a game by team coach Thair Ahmed, and he has been a first team member since. The winger has become the youngest player in the history in their 83-year existence and went on to sign a senior contract with the club. He scored the opening goal of the 2016 Iraq FA Cup Final which his team went on to win.

=== Persepolis ===
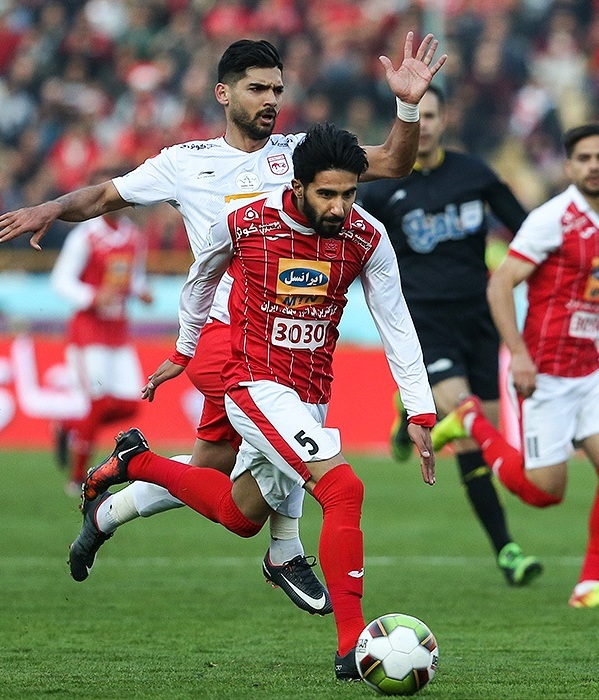
Resan playing for Persepolis against Tractor in 2018

On 3 July 2017, Resan signed a two-year contract with Persian Gulf Pro League Champions Persepolis. He joined the team after the end of the Iraqi regular season, which he won alongside Al-Quwa Al-Jawiya. He made his league debut in 1–0 loss to Paykan on 17 September. He Played a few minutes in his first season. Resan was influential in his second season at the club and played more there. He scored his first goal against Saipa. His contract was extended until the end of the 2020–21 season. On 20 December 2020, he left the club by mutual consent, to move to Qatar SC.

=== Qatar SC ===
On 31 December 2020, Qatar SC announced the signing of Resan after successful seasons with Persepolis.

=== Pakhtakor ===
On 13 December 2024, Uzbekistan Super League club Pakhtakor announced the signing of Resan to a one-year contract, with the option of a second year.

== Career statistics ==
=== Club ===
As of 30 December 2021

Club	Division	Season	League		Cup		Asia		Total	
Club	Division	Season	Apps	Goals	Apps	Goals	Apps	Goals	Apps	Goals
Persepolis	Persian Gulf League	2017–18	16	0	3	0	4	0	23	0
Persepolis	Persian Gulf League	2018–19	25	1	1	0	12	0	38	1
Persepolis	Persian Gulf League	2019–20	22	2	3	1	4	0	29	3
Persepolis	Persian Gulf League	2020–21	3	0	0	0	10	1	13	1
Persepolis	Total		66	3	7	1	30	1	103	5
Qatar SC	Qatar Stars League	2020–21	10	2	1	0	—		11	2
Qatar SC	Qatar Stars League	2021–22	15	3	2	1	—		17	4
Qatar SC	Total		91	8	10	2	30	1	131	11

== International career ==
On 4 September 2014, Resan made his International debut against Peru in a friendly match that ended 0–2 for Peru. He went onto will make his full international debut for Iraq at the age of just 17 years, 8 months and 13 days after first coming to prominence in the Iraqi league in 2010 at the age of 14. He was part of the team which achieved the 2016 AFC U-23 bronze medal.

=== International ===
As of match played 21 March 2024.

Appearances and goals by national team and year
National team	Year	Apps	Goals
Iraq	2014	1	0
Iraq	2015	2	0
Iraq	2016	4	0
Iraq	2017	4	0
Iraq	2018	4	0
Iraq	2019	4	2
Iraq	2020	7	0
Iraq	2021	9	1
Iraq	2022	9	0
Iraq	2023	7	1
Iraq	2024	4	0
Total		55	4

Scores and results list Iraq's goal tally first.

No.	Date	Venue	Opponent	Score	Result	Competition
1.	12 January 2019	Sharjah Stadium, Sharjah, United Arab Emirates	Yemen	2–0	3–0	2019 AFC Asian Cup
2.	26 March 2019	Basra Sports City, Basra, Iraq	Jordan	2–1	3–2	2019 International Friendship Championship
3.	7 June 2021	Al Muharraq Stadium, Arad, Bahrain	Cambodia	2–0	4–1	2022 FIFA World Cup qualification
4.	16 November 2023	Basra International Stadium, Basra, Iraq	Indonesia	1–0	5–1	2026 FIFA World Cup qualification

== Honours ==
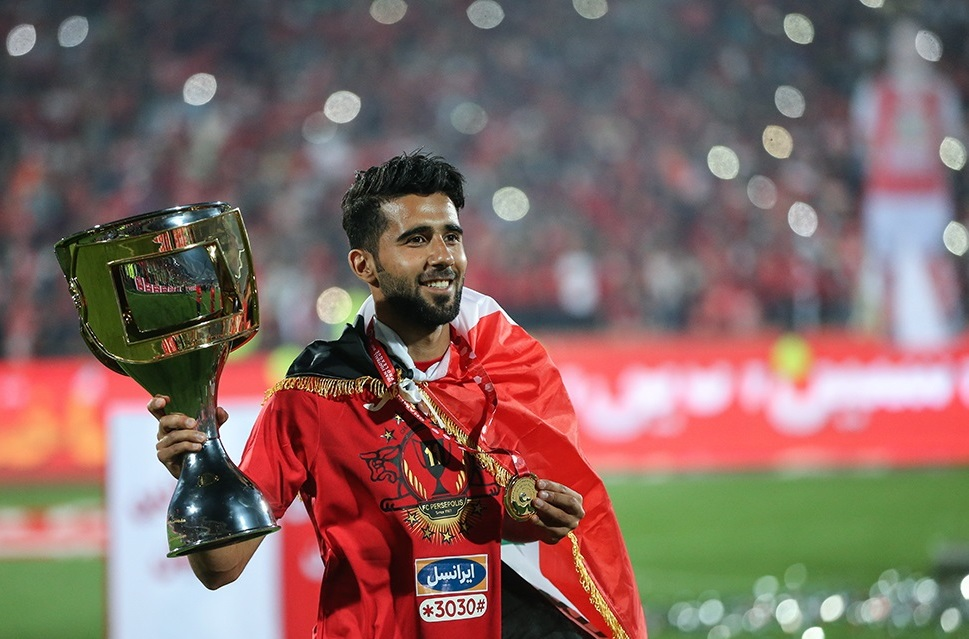
Bashar Resan in Persepolis championship celebration (2017-18 Persian Gulf Pro League)

Al-Quwa Al-Jawiya

- Iraqi Premier League: 2016–17
- Iraq FA Cup: 2015–16
- AFC Cup: 2016

Persepolis

- Persian Gulf Pro League: 2017–18, 2018–19, 2019–20
- Hazfi Cup: 2018–19
- Iranian Super Cup: 2017, 2018, 2019
- AFC Champions League runner-up: 2018, 2020

Pakhtakor

- Uzbekistan Cup: 2025

Iraq U-23

- AFC U-22 Championship: 2013

Iraq Military

- CISM World Football Trophy: 2013
