= Humam Tariq =

Iraqi footballer

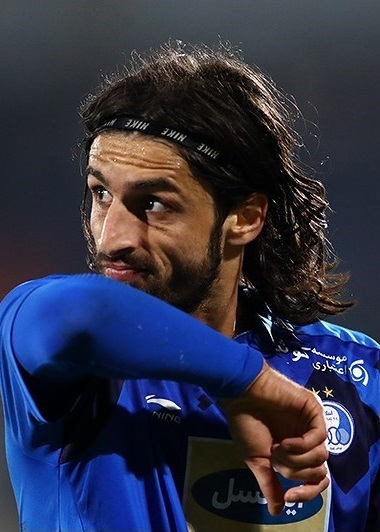
- Humam Tariq at Iranian club Esteghlal at 2019 AFC Champions League

Personal information
- Full name: Humam Tariq Faraj Naoush
- Date of birth: 10 February 1994 (age 32)
- Place of birth: Baghdad, Iraq
- Height: 1.71 m (5 ft 7 in)
- Positions: Winger; attacking midfielder

Team information
- Current team: Erbil SC

Youth career
- 2006–2007: Al-Zawraa
- 2007–2010: Al-Quwa Al-Jawiya

Senior career*
Years	Team	Apps	(Gls)
2010–2014	Al-Quwa Al-Jawiya	46	(4)
2014–2016	Al-Ahli	0	(0)
2014–2015	→ Al Dhafra (loan)	20	(2)
2015–2016	→ Al-Quwa Al-Jawiya (loan)	14	(2)
2016–2018	Al-Quwa Al-Jawiya	53	(6)
2018–2019	Esteghlal	14	(1)
2019–2020	Ismaily	8	(2)
2020–2021	Al-Quwa Al-Jawiya	12	(3)
2021–2022	Al-Ahly Benghazi		
2022–2023	Muaither	11	(2)
2023–2024	Al-Quwa Al-Jawiya		
2024–2025	Al-Talaba		
2025–	Erbil		

International career^{‡}
2012–2013	Iraq U20	13	(0)
2012–2016	Iraq U23	15	(5)
2012–	Iraq	77	(3)
Medal record
Representing Iraq
Men's football
Asian Games
Bronze medal – third place	2014 Incheon	Team
AFC U-19 Championship
Runner-up	2012 AFC U-19 Championship	Team
AFC U-22 Championship
First place	2013 AFC U-22 Championship	Team
Arabian Gulf Cup
Runner-up	21st Arabian Gulf Cup	Team
- * Club domestic league appearances and goals as of 27 April 2020 ‡ National team caps and goals as of 6 October 2026

Humam Tariq Faraj Naoush (Arabic: همام طارق فرج نعوش; born 10 February 1994) is an Iraqi professional footballer who plays for Erbil and the Iraq national team as winger. He also played for Esteghlal F.C. between 2018 and 2019. Tariq has long been considered one of Iraq's most talented footballers. He has represented Iraq at Under-19, Under-20, Under-22, Under-23 and full international level, making his debut for the national team at the age of 16, making him the youngest Iraqi in history to represent the senior team. Humam represented Iraq at the Rio Olympics in 2016, playing in all 3 of Iraq's matches against Denmark, Brazil and South Africa. Tariq has also played at the 2013 FIFA Under-20 World Cup, where he was one of Iraq's star players as the underdogs went on a run to the semi-final. At senior level, he has played at the 2015 AFC Asian Cup, where they beat the odds and reached the semi-final.

== Club career ==
=== Early career ===
Tariq started playing football at a very young age and often participated in local matches and could regularly be seen playing as a child in public. This eventually caught the attention of Baghdad's biggest clubs. He decided he wanted to pursue a career in football, and from an early age he used to play with older kids at the local shaabiya football pitches near where he grew up before he joined the youth teams in the academy of Iraqi giants Al-Zawraa. He stayed with Al Zawraa for a few months but later decided that he wanted to play for his boyhood club Al-Quwa Al-Jawiya, who he joined in 2007 at the age of 11.

=== Al-Quwa Al-Jawiya ===
==== 2009–10 ====
At a young age, Tariq started his football career, by joining Al-Quwa Al-Jawiya's academy, where he kept getting promoted until, in 2010, he joined the senior team at the age of just 14. He started playing for the senior team, in the 2009–10 Iraqi Premier League. He made his debut with Al-Quwa Al-Jawiya, on 26 May 2010, in a match against Salahaddin FC, where the match ended in a 2–0 win for Al-Jawiya.

==== 2010–11 ====
He appeared every two or three matches as substitute. Al-Quwa Al-Jawiya finished in 2nd place in the groups stage, being qualified to the third place match, where they lost against Al-Sinaa SC 0–1.

==== 2011–12 ====
Tariq scored his first goal in his third season with Al-Quwa Al-Jawiya, on 27 April 2012, in a match against Zakho FC, three minutes after the beginning of the match, which ended in a 1–1 draw. Tariq scored his second goal in a match against Al-Sinaa, which ended in a 2–1 loss for Al-Quwa Al-Jawiya. Tariq scored his third goal in a match against Arbil FC, which ended in a 1–1 draw. Tariq scored only three goals in this season. Al-Quwa Al-Jawiya finished in 3rd place in the league table, at 74 points, while Arbil FC became the champions, at 83 points.

==== 2012–13 ====
In the 2012–13 Iraqi Premier League, Tariq scored only a single goal against Kirkuk FC. Al-Quwa Al-Jawiya finished in 3rd place, at 69 points, while Al Shorta SC became the champions, at 72 points, with Tariq not finishing the league season. In the 2012–13 UAFA Club Cup, Tariq scored a goal, in the first leg of the match, against Shabab Al-Dhahiriya SC from Palestine, which ended in a 3–0 victory for Al-Quwa Al-Jawiya. Tariq did not stay with Al-Quwa Al-Jawiya until the end of the tournament. Eventually, Al-Quwa Al-Jawiya was eliminated, in the quarterfinals, by Raja Casablanca from Morocco. In Tariq's last days in the club, on 24 May 2014, he was fined with $10,000 by the club's management because Tariq missed his team's training camp in Sulaymaniyah.

=== Al Ahli ===
On 29 January 2013, at the age of 16, Tariq signed a contract worth $9,582 per week with Al-Ahli, who bought him for €600,000, to play for them for 5 years, with bonuses and good efforts income added. Al Ahli also provided an apartment for Tariq in Dubai, a personal car and free transportation between Baghdad and Dubai for Tariq and his family. Although Tariq signed the contract in January 2013, he had to wait over a year to join the squad, because he wasn't going to be 18 years old until 10 February 2014, at which point he wasn't allowed to join up with his new club. He was loaned to Al Dhafra after playing only two friendly matches with Al Ahli.

==== Failed Transfers to Turkey ====
On 14 June 2015, Al-Ahli received an official offer from an unnamed Turkish team to either buy or loan Tariq. After five days, Tariq's agent, Najm Mohammed, stated that the negotiations between the unnamed Turkish side and Al-Ahli broke down after Al-Ahli demanded $400,000 for Humam but the team wasn't willing to pay more than $200,000. Al-Ahli received an offer from another team in the Süper Lig and it was Bursaspor. Al-Ahli initially accepted the offer. But, again, on 30 June, Tariq's agent announced that the deal failed, in the last moments, because Bursaspor offered a low amount of money and the offer was rejected by Al-Ahli. In July 2015, two teams from the Iraqi Premier League showed interest in signing Tariq, his last team, Al-Quwa Al-Jawiya, and Al Shorta.

==== Al Dhafra (loan) ====
On 1 October 2014, Tariq was loaned to Al Dhafra, without playing a single official game for Al-Ahli. His loan contract stated that Tariq will play for Al Dhafra for the 2014–15 season, which can be extended.

Tariq played his debut match, in the 2014–15 season, on 5 October, against Emirates Club. He played for 77 minutes and got subbed off for Ali Al-Hammadi. Tariq scored his first goal with Al Dhafra on 29 November, against Al-Ittihad Kalba, in the 19th minute, rocketing the ball from outside the penalty box into the right corner of the goal, from a pass by Makhete Diop. His second goal with Al Dhafra was one of the fastest goals in the UAE Arabian Gulf League, on 10 May 2015, in the 4th minute, against Al-Shabab. Tariq finished the league season with Al Dhafra in 12th place at 26 points, only one place away from relegation.

In the UAE President's Cup, Tariq played Al Dhafra's match in the Round of 16, on 15 May 2015. He had an assist in a goal for Bilal Najjarine from a free kick, crossed by Tariq to Bilal's head. Tariq was injured, in that match, with a muscle strain. Al Dhafra won 7–6 on penalties after a 1–1 draw. In the quarterfinals, Tariq started the match against Ajman, where he had another assist in the first goal, by crossing the ball to Makhete Diop's head and into the goal, in the 62nd minute. The match ended in a 2–0 win for Al Dhafra. In the semi-finals, against Al-Ahli, Tariq wasn't allowed to play because of the friendly agreement between Al Dhafra and Al Ahli that doesn't allow him to play in a match against Al Ahli. Al Dhafra lost the match 0–2. Tariq finished his season with his team that he was loaned to with a total of 22 appearances, that included 2 goals and 2 assists. After the end of the season, Al Dhafra didn't show interest in extending Tariq's contract. Therefore, he returned to Al-Ahli.

==== Al-Quwa Al-Jawiya ====
In 2015, Tariq returned to Jawiya in a loan deal for the season and played in the league and FA Cup, where he scored in the FA Cup final which Jawiya won by two goals to win the cup. After a successful loan spell at Jawiya, Humam returned permanently in 2016 where he has consistently impressed for the Iraqi outfit, regaining him a call up to the national team and new rumours of a move abroad.

=== Esteghlal ===
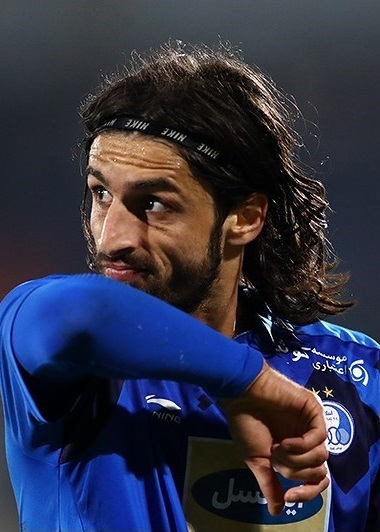
Tariq playing for Esteghlal in 2019

After failing to join Elazığspor in the TFF First League, Tariq officially joined Esteghlal on a three-year contract on 1 August 2018. He was assigned the number 17 shirt in Esteghlal.

On 16 August 2018, Tariq made his competitive debut for Esteghlal as a second-half substitute in a 1–0 away defeat against Pars Jonoubi Jam. On 29 November 2018, he scored his first goal for the club in a 3–0 victory over Sanat Naft Abadan.

=== Ismaily SC ===
On 2 August 2019, Ismaily officially signed Iraqi winger Humam Tariq as a free agent. He played his first match with Ismaily on 13 September 2019 in a match in the first leg of round of 32 of Arab Club Champions Cup against Al-Ahly SC (Benghazi) after being subbed on in the second half of the game. The game ended 4–2 win for Ismaily

On 26 November 2019, Humam scored his first goal with Ismaily against Al Jazira Club in the Arab Club Champions Cup in the 87th minute of the game, which led to a 2–0 win for Ismaily and advance to the quarter finals

== International career ==
On 30 December 2012, Tariq made his international debut for the Iraqi senior team, against Tunisia, in a friendly match that ended in a 2–1 loss for Iraq. Tariq, on that day, became the youngest player in the history of the Iraq national football team to wear the Iraqi shirt at the age of 16.

=== 2013 Gulf Cup ===
The 2013 Gulf Cup was the tournament that led Tariq to success and made him shine. He started the first match of Iraq, as a left winger, against Saudi Arabia, that ended in a 2–0 win for Iraq. Tariq went on to start the second match of Iraq, against Kuwait, that ended in a 1–0 win for Iraq. In Iraq's third match, against Yemen, Tariq stayed on the bench, being replaced with Nabeel Sabah as the left winger. The match ended in a 2–0 win for Iraq. Tariq started the semi-final match against Bahrain. The match went to extra time and then penalties, after a 1–1 draw. Iraq won 4–2 on penalties. In the final, Tariq started as a left midfielder, against UAE, in the match that ended in a 2–1 loss for Iraq. Therefore, Iraq became the runners-up of the 2013 edition.

=== 2015 AFC Asian Cup qualification ===
Tariq contributed in 4 matches out of the total 6 for Iraq in the 2015 AFC Asian Cup qualification. The matches' results were a 1–0 win against Indonesia on 6 February 2013, 0–1 loss against China on 22 March, 1–2 loss against Saudi Arabia on 15 November, and a 2–0 win against Indonesia on 19 November. Eventually, Iraq qualified to the 2015 AFC Asian Cup by winning 3–1 against China, where Tariq wasn't included.

=== 2014 FIFA World Cup qualification ===
Tariq played only two matches of the 2014 FIFA World Cup qualification (AFC), in the fourth round. The first, against Oman, on 4 June 2013, where he got subbed off in the 55th minute after failing to clear the ball. The match ended in a 1–0 win for Oman. On the other match, against Australia, on 18 June, Tariq got subbed off again in the 75th minute. The match was also lost by Iraq and won 1–0 by Australia. After this match, Iraq was at the bottom of Group B, having 5 points from 8 matches played, resulting in not qualifying to the World Cup.

=== 2013 FIFA U20 World Cup ===
Tariq was included in the 2013 FIFA U-20 World Cup squad. He started in all of Iraq's matches. In the first match of Iraq under-20 team, they came up against England, where it ended in a hard 2–2 draw for Iraq. In the second match, they were against Egypt, where Tariq had his first yellow card with an international team in the 57th minute and it ended in a 2–1 win for Iraq. In the third match, against Chile, it ended also in a 2–1 win for Iraq. In the Round of 16, Iraq won over Paraguay, after the match went to extra time, 1–0. In the quarterfinal, Iraq won over Korea Republic. After the match ended in a 3–3 draw, it went to penalties, where Iraq won 5–4. In the semi-final, Iraq lost against Uruguay. After the match ended in a 1–1 draw, it went to penalties again, but this time, Iraq lost 6–7, with Tariq scoring his penalty.

=== 2014 Asian Games ===
Tariq was one of the best players that played in the 2014 Asian Games, scoring four goals, being the top scorer for Iraq, along with Younis Mahmoud. Tariq started in all of Iraq's matches. He scored in Iraq's second match, on 17 September 2014, against Japan, in the 12th minute. Tariq was the man of the match in Iraq's third game, against Kuwait, scoring two goals in the 16th and 62nd minutes and playing quite well. Tariq scored his fourth goal in Iraq's round of 16 match, against Tajikistan, in the early 7th minute. Iraq won in the quarterfinal, 3–0 against Saudi Arabia, but lost in the semi-final, against North Korea, 0–1, where Tariq didn't perform that well. In the third place match, Iraq won, gaining the bronze medal.

=== 2014 Gulf Cup ===
Tariq was a part of the squad that had the worst ever performance for Iraq in the Gulf Cup, since the 2009 edition, in the 2014 Gulf Cup. He started in all of the three matches of Iraq, lost 0–1 against Kuwait, drew 1–1 with Oman, where Tariq got a yellow card, and lost 2–0 against the UAE.

=== 2015 AFC Asian Cup ===
Tariq was included in Iraq's squad for the 2015 AFC Asian Cup, but he only played 57 minutes of the first match of Iraq, against Jordan. Iraq eventually reached the semi-final and lost, ending in 4th place.

=== 2019 AFC Asian cup ===
Tariq participated in the 2019 AFC Asian Cup, hosted by UAE. Tariq was one of Iraq's key players in the tournament, helping them reach the round of 16 where they were knocked out by Qatar in a 1–0 loss.

=== International goals ===
Scores and results list Iraq's goal tally first.

#	Date	Venue	Opponent	Score	Result	Competition
1.	28 March 2015	The Sevens Stadium, Dubai	DR Congo	2–1	2–1	Friendly
2.	28 December 2018	Suheim Bin Hamad Stadium, Doha	Palestine	1–0	1–0	Friendly
3.	8 January 2019	Zayed Sports City Stadium, Abu Dhabi	Vietnam	2–2	3–2	2019 AFC Asian Cup

== Style of play ==
The secret for the success of Younis at the Gulf Cup was Humam, and the secret to the future success of Younis will be Humam Tariq, because of the quick link-up play from Humam, as he's the fastest player on the flanks to Younis, assisting him and one of the important keys to opening the door of the opposition is that he's the quickest player in Iraq (on the ball).

— Hakim Shaker commenting on Tariq

Tariq uses speed and size to create space from defenders around the wings and center positions. As a player who plays predominantly as an attacking midfielder, he depends on his crossing skills, finishing and distributing abilities. With his pace and technical skills, the media and analysts alike have compared his style to that of Raheem Sterling and Lionel Messi, which has made Tariq earn the nickname of “Iraqi Messi".

Tariq has been deployed as a winger and in more central attacking roles. He is known for his crossing, passing and pace.

== Personal life ==
Humam Tariq was born to the Naoush family from the Adhamiyah district in Baghdad. He is the grandson of Faraj Naoush, the creator of Confectionery of Faraj Naoush and His Sons, which was created in 1954. It was one of the best confectionery shops in Iraq, especially, during the Sanctions against Iraq in the 1990s. Humam helped out in the family business in his spare time making the sweets. Humam is married. His son Tariq was born in July 2017.

== Honours ==
=== Club ===
Al-Quwa Al-Jawiya

- AFC Cup: 2016, 2017
- Iraq FA Cup: 2015–16 ، 2020–21
- Iraqi Premier League: 2016–17 ، 2020–21

Shabab Al Ahli

- UAE Pro-League: 2013–14
- UAE Super Cup: 2014
- UAE League Cup: 2014

Muaither SC

- Qatari Second Division: 2022–23

=== International ===
Iraq U-19

- AFC U-19 Championship runner-up: 2012

Iraq U-20

- FIFA U-20 World Cup fourth place: 2013

Iraq U-22

- AFC U-22 Championship winner: 2013

Iraq U-23

- Asian Games bronze medallist: 2014

Iraq

- Arabian Gulf Cup runner-up: 2013
- AFC Asian Cup fourth-place: 2015
- WAFF Championship runner-up: 2019

=== Individual ===
- World Military Cup Asian Qualification Zone Best Player: 2013.
- Outside of the Boot's 100 Best Young Players to Watch: 2015.
- Soccer Iraq Team of the Decade: 2010–2019
