= Alaa Al-Sasi =

Yemeni footballer

Ala Al-Sasi
Personal information
- Full name: Ala Mohammed Abdullah Al-Sasi
- Date of birth: 2 July 1987 (age 39)
- Place of birth: Abyan Governorate, Yemen
- Height: 1.75 m (5 ft 9 in)
- Position: Attacking midfielder

Youth career
- 2002–2005: Al-Ahli San'a'

Senior career*
Years	Team	Apps	(Gls)
2005–2009	Al-Ahli San'a'		
2009–2012	Al-Hilal		
2012–2013	Al-Minaa	28	(3)
2013–2014	Al-Hilal		
2014–2018	Al-Ahli San'a'		
2018–2019	Al-Sailiya		
2020	Lao Toyota	16	(0)

International career
2006	Yemen U-23		
2006–2019	Yemen	84	(11)
- * Club domestic league appearances and goals

Ala Al-Sasi (Arabic: علاء الصاصي; born 2 July 1987) is a Yemeni international footballer who plays as an attacking midfielder.

== International goals ==
Scores and results list Yemen's goal tally first.

Ala Al-Sasi – goals for Yemen
#	Date	Venue	Opponent	Score	Result	Competition
1	20 December 2006	Ali Mohsen Al-Muraisi Stadium, Sana'a, Yemen	Djibouti	1–1	3–1	2009 Arab Nations Cup qualification
2	20 January 2007	Mohammed Bin Zayed Stadium, Abu Dhabi, United Arab Emirates	United Arab Emirates	1–2	1–2	18th Arabian Gulf Cup
3	15 January 2010	Ali Mohsen Al-Muraisi Stadium, Sana'a, Yemen	Kenya	2–1	3–1	Friendly
4	15 January 2010	Ali Mohsen Al-Muraisi Stadium, Sana'a, Yemen	Kenya	3–1	3–1	Friendly
5	13 October 2010	Shree Shiv Chhatrapati Sports Complex, Pune, India	India	4–2	6–3	Friendly
6	13 October 2010	Shree Shiv Chhatrapati Sports Complex, Pune, India	India	5–2	6–3	Friendly
7	28 October 2010	Aden, Yemen	Senegal	4–1	4–1	Friendly
8	23 June 2012	Prince Abdullah Al Faisal Stadium, Jeddah, Saudi Arabia	Libya	1–3	1–3	2012 Arab Nations Cup
9	15 November 2013	Khalifa International Stadium, Doha, Qatar	Qatar	1–1	1–4	2015 AFC Asian Cup qualification
10	12 March 2015	Grand Hamad Stadium, Doha, Qatar	Pakistan	3–1	3–1	2018 FIFA World Cup qualification
11	28 March 2017	Suheim Bin Hamad Stadium, Doha, Qatar	Tajikistan	2–1	2–1	2019 AFC Asian Cup qualification

== Honours ==
Al-Ahli San'a'

- Yemeni League: 2006–07
- Yemeni President Cup: 2009
