= Safaa Jabbar =

Iraqi footballer

Safa Jabbar
Personal information
- Full name: Safaa Jabbar
- Date of birth: July 20, 1993 (age 33)
- Place of birth: Al-Qādisiyyah, Iraq
- Height: 1.79 m (5 ft 10 in)
- Position: Centre-back

Team information
- Current team: Zakho

Senior career*
Years	Team	Apps	(Gls)
2008–2011	Diwaniya FC		
2010	Al-Najaf (loan)		
2011–2012	Al-Minaa		(1)
2012–2015	Naft Al-Janoob		
2015–2016	Zakho		
2016–2017	Naft Al-Janoob		
2017–2018	Naft Al-Wasat		
2018–	Al-Najaf		

International career^{‡}
2015–2016	Iraq U23	3	(0)
2015	Iraq	1	(0)
- * Club domestic league appearances and goals as of 3 October 2015 ‡ National team caps and goals as of 3 October 2015

Safaa Jabbar (Arabic: صَفَاء جَبَّار; born July 20, 1993) is an Iraqi professional footballer who currently plays for Naft Al-Janoob in the Iraqi Premier League. He plays as a defender.

== International debut ==
On October 3, 2015, Safaa Jabbar made his first international cap with Iraq against Jordan in a friendly match.
