= Ahmed Sadeq Al Khamri =

Yemeni footballer

Personal information
- Full name: Ahmed Sadeq Al Khamri
- Date of birth: December 28, 1992 (age 33)
- Place of birth: Yemen
- Position: Centre-back

Team information
- Current team: Peshmerga

Senior career*
Years	Team	Apps	(Gls)
2010–2011	Al-Tilal		
2011–2012	Al-Shula		
2012–2014	Al-Minaa	49	(5)
2014–2017	Al-Shula		
2017–2018	Al-Bahri		
2018	Al Ahli	1	(0)
2019–	Peshmerga		

International career
2013–	Yemen		
- * Club domestic league appearances and goals as of April 20, 2017

Ahmed Sadeq Al Khamri (Arabic: أحمد صادق الخمري; born 28 December 1992) is a Yemeni footballer who plays as a Defense currently plays for Peshmerga.

== 21st Arabian Gulf Cup ==
Ahmed Sadeq played in the 21st Arabian Gulf Cup with Yemen. He played three matches against Kuwait, Saudi Arabia and Iraq. But Yemen lost all their matches to come out the tournament.
