= Ali Husni =

Iraqi footballer

Ali Husni عَلِيّ حُصْنِيّ
Personal information
- Full name: Ali Husni Faisal
- Date of birth: 23 May 1994 (age 32)
- Place of birth: Basra, Iraq
- Height: 1.67 m (5 ft 6 in)
- Positions: Winger; second striker

Team information
- Current team: Naft Al-Basra

Youth career
- –2012: Al-Minaa

Senior career*
Years	Team	Apps	(Gls)
2012–2018	Al-Minaa	100	(19)
2016	→ Caykur Rizespor (loan)	0	(0)
2016–2017	→ Al-Arabi (loan)	15	(4)
2018–2021	Al-Quwa Al-Jawiya		
2021–2024	Al-Shorta	82	(8)
2024–2025	Al-Karma SC	8	(0)
2025	Al-Zawraa		
2026–	Naft Al-Basra		

International career^{‡}
2015–2016	Iraq U23	11	(3)
2014–2022	Iraq	28	(3)
- * Club domestic league appearances and goals as of 16/12/24 @ 15:54(AEST) ‡ National team caps and goals as of 18 July 2026

Ali Husni Faisal (Arabic: عَلِيّ حُصْنِيّ فَيْصَل; born 23 May 1994), is an Iraqi footballer and Olympian who plays as a winger for Iraqi Premier Division League club Naft Al-Basra and the Iraqi national team.

He played at the 2016 Rio Olympics for Iraq. In 2016 he signed for Turkish club Caykur Rizespor before personal issues caused the contract to be terminated and he returned to his boyhood club Al-Minaa.

== Club career ==
=== Al Minaa ===
Ali Husni Faisal was born in 1994 and progressed through the youth ranks of Al-Minaa. Ali started his career at his hometown club Al-Minaa, the biggest club in the city of Basra under the supervision of Mohammed Abdul-Hussein. In 2012, he was named the player of the tournament at the Iraq School Championship and lifted the cup for the Basra Tarbiya XI, with a 5-1 victory over Baghdad Al-Karkh XI. He was part of the club's academy and broke into the first team in 2012.

He quickly established himself at Al-Minaa becoming a fan favourite and an important part of the club. He was the club's star player and scored and assisted in most matches. He played most of his games on the right midfield where he scored 18 goals in 85 league appearances over a span of 5 years. He has also played on the left wing and down the middle as an attacking midfielder.

At the start of the 2012-2013 season, the attacking midfield star had spent most of the early season on the sidelines with severe stomach pains and suffering from anaemia, a decrease of red blood cells in his blood, which threatened his future in the game. Many at the club believed his football career was over.

While gaining a call-up to the youth team, the star of Ghazi Fahad’s youthful side has already caught the eye of the national coach Vladimir Petrović in 2013, according to the player, however he did not feel the time was right for him to make that step-up to the seniors.

″“The national team masseur Abu Abdullah once told me that Petrović admired me, and it was very likely that I would be one of his selections, but in the future, I don’t currently feel that I’m ready to play for the national side. The reason is that I have not played for the nasheen (Under 17s), or the Shabab (Under 20s) and it is difficult to go directly and play for the national team.″”

=== Failed transfer to Çaykur Rizespor ===
Ali was announced by Turkish top flight club Caykur Rizespor ahead of the 2016/17 Super Lig Season. A few weeks after signing the contract, however, his deal was terminated for personal reasons and disagreements over promises which were broken by the club. After his contract was terminated, he returned to Al-Minaa.

=== Al Arabi ===
Ali signed for Kuwaiti side Al Arabi on a 6-month deal on January 26, 2017. This made him the first Iraqi to play in Kuwait since 1991. He made his debut on February 2, 2017 in an Emir cup match Vs Al-Salmiya as a first-half substitute, coming on the field in the 41st minute. He assisted the only goal scored by his team as the match ended 1-1. He made 15 league appearances, scoring 4 goals as the team finished in 4th place.

=== Return to Al Minaa ===
Ali returned on August 20, 2017, having received his clearance to play hours before the match. Ali came on as a second half substitute in the second half of the Iraq FA Cup semifinals against Naft Al-Wasat, and he scored on the 68th minute.

== International career ==
=== Iraq National Team ===
The lively winger had long been touted as the future star of Iraq’s midfield but was continuingly ignored by former national coach Hakim Shaker, in what seemed to have been a personal grudge against him for his public outburst after he was dropped from the 2013 FIFA U-20 World Cup squad. He would eventually make his senior international debut in the last minutes of a friendly game against North Korea national team on 21 February 2014 but was overlooked by the same coach for the Asian Games in Busan and the Gulf Cup in Saudi Arabia. Radhi Shenaishil, the Iraqi manager at the time, called Ali up as part of the squad for the 2015 AFC Asian Cup. Iraq eventually finished fourth in the tournament. Ali scored his first ever international goal against Chinese Taipei in the 2018 FIFA World Cup qualification. Ali scored in back to back games, both off the bench, in the Arabian Gulf Cup.

=== Iraq U-23 ===
Ali was instrumental in Iraq winning the Bronze medal in the 2016 AFC U-23 Championship and their subsequent qualification to the 2016 Rio Olympics. Ali scored 2 goals in the U-23 Championship, including the equalizer against the UAE in the quarterfinal which took Iraq to extra time and gave them a 3-1 win. He also got an assist, and positive attacking play made him one of the stars of the tournament.

=== Iraq national team goals ===
Scores and results list Iraq's goal tally first.

#	Date	Venue	Opponent	Score	Result	Competition
1.	3 September 2015	PAS Stadium, Tehran, Iran	Chinese Taipei	2–0	5–1	2018 FIFA World Cup qualification
2.	26 December 2017	Al Kuwait Sports Club Stadium, Kuwait City, Kuwait	Qatar	2–1	2–1	23rd Arabian Gulf Cup
3.	29 December 2017	Al Kuwait Sports Club Stadium, Kuwait City, Kuwait	Yemen	1–0	3–0	23rd Arabian Gulf Cup

== Honours ==
=== Club ===
Al-Quwa Al-Jawiya

- AFC Cup: 2018

Al-Shorta

- Iraq Stars League: 2021–22, 2022–23, 2023–24
- Iraq FA Cup: 2023–24
- Iraqi Super Cup: 2022

=== International ===
- 4th Place in the 2015 AFC Asian Cup
- 3rd Place in the 2016 AFC U-23 Championship
