= Hasan Hammood =

Iraqi footballer

Personal information
- Full name: Hasan Hammood Ghlaim Al-Jammali
- Date of birth: 5 October 1986 (age 40)
- Place of birth: Iraq
- Position: Midfielder

Team information
- Current team: Naft Maysan
- Number: 8

Senior career*
Years	Team	Apps	(Gls)
2009–2012	Naft Maysan		(3)
2012–2014	Al-Mina'a		(9)
2014–	Naft Maysan		(8)

International career^{‡}
2019–	Iraq	2	(0)
- * Club domestic league appearances and goals as of 16 July 2019 ‡ National team caps and goals as of 14 January 2020

Hasan Hammood Ghlaim Al-Jammali (Arabic: حسن حمود غليم الجمالي; born 5 October 1986) is an Iraqi professional footballer who plays as a midfielder for Iraqi Premier League club Naft Maysan and the Iraq national team.

== International career ==
On 26 November 2019, Hammood made his first international cap with Iraq against Qatar in the 24th Arabian Gulf Cup.
