= 2015–16 Iraqi Premier League =

Iraqi Premier League
- Season: 2015–16
- Dates: 15 September 2015 – 22 May 2016
- Champions: Al-Zawraa (13th title)
- Relegated: Duhok; Al-Sinaa
- AFC Cup: Al-Zawraa; Al-Quwa Al-Jawiya
- Arab Club Championship: Naft Al-Wasat
- Matches: 198
- Goals: 410 (2.07 per match)
- Top goalscorer: Hammadi Ahmed; Mohannad Abdul-Raheem (12 goals each)
- Highest scoring: Al-Karkh 4–4 Al-Talaba (21 March 2015)
- Longest winning run: 5 games Al-Minaa
- Longest unbeaten run: 24 games Al-Zawraa
- Longest winless run: 13 games Al-Sinaa
- Longest losing run: 5 games Al-Kahrabaa

The 2015–16 Iraqi Premier League (known as the Fuchs Premier League for sponsorship reasons) was the 42nd season of the Iraqi Premier League since its establishment in 1974. The season started on 15 September 2015 and concluded on 22 May 2016.

Al-Zawraa won a record 13th Iraqi Premier League title, finishing one point ahead of defending champions Naft Al-Wasat. Al-Zawraa went through all 24 matches without a single defeat: the seventh time that a team has won the league undefeated since the league's inception in 1974.

== Group stage ==
=== Group 1 ===
Pos	Team	Pld	W	D	L	GF	GA	GD	Pts	Qualification or relegation
1	Al-Zawraa	17	11	6	0	24	10	+14	39	Qualified to Elite Stage
2	Naft Al-Wasat	17	10	5	2	24	14	+10	35	Qualified to Elite Stage
3	Al-Naft	17	9	5	3	21	10	+11	32	Qualified to Elite Stage
4	Al-Talaba	17	7	6	4	20	14	+6	27	Qualified to Elite Stage
5	Naft Maysan	17	6	6	5	16	16	0	24	
6	Al-Kahrabaa	17	3	7	7	9	17	−8	16	
7	Naft Al-Junoob	17	3	6	8	15	20	−5	15	
8	Al-Karkh	17	2	6	9	11	20	−9	12	
9	Al-Samawa	17	2	4	11	14	26	−12	10	
10	Duhok (Note: Duhok withdrew from the league after 11 matches, with their results from the second round-robin being annulled.)	9	2	1	6	8	15	−7	7	Relegated to Iraqi First Division League

Source: Goalzz
Rules for classification: 1) points; 2) goal difference; 3) number of goals scored.

==== Results ====
Home \ Away	KAH	KAR	NFT	SMA	TLB	ZWR	DUH	NFJ	NFW	NFM
Al-Kahrabaa		0–0	1–1	1–1	0–2	1–2	1–0	1–0	0–0	0–1
Al-Karkh	1–0		0–0	1–1	4–4	0–2		2–1	0–1	1–1
Al-Naft	0–0	3–2		4–1	2–0	0–1	3–0	2–1	0–0	1–0
Al-Samawa	1–1	1–0	0–1		0–1	0–1	– (Note: Duhok's results away to Naft Al-Junoob (3–1 loss) and Al-Samawa (1–0 loss) were annulled after their withdrawal from the league.)	0–1	3–1	2–2
Al-Talaba	3–1	1–0	0–1	2–0		0–1		1–0	1–1	2–0
Al-Zawraa	2–1	2–0	2–2	2–1	0–0		1–0	0–0	2–1	0–0
Duhok (Note: Duhok withdrew from the league after 11 matches, with their results from the second round-robin being annulled.)		1–0		3–2	1–1			1–2	1–3	
Naft Al-Junoob	0–0	0–0	0–1	2–1	2–2	2–2	–		2–3	1–1
Naft Al-Wasat	3–0	1–0	1–0	1–0	1–0	1–1		2–1		2–1
Naft Maysan	0–1	1–0	1–0	2–0	0–0	1–3	2–1	1–0	2–2	

Source: Goalzz
Legend: Blue = home team win; Yellow = draw; Red = away team win.

=== Group 2 ===
Pos	Team	Pld	W	D	L	GF	GA	GD	Pts	Qualification or relegation
1	Al-Quwa Al-Jawiya	17	10	3	4	22	11	+11	33	Qualified to Elite Stage
2	Al-Minaa	18	9	5	4	27	17	+10	32	Qualified to Elite Stage
3	Amanat Baghdad	18	9	3	6	22	17	+5	30	Qualified to Elite Stage
4	Al-Shorta	18	9	2	7	20	19	+1	29	Qualified to Elite Stage
5	Zakho	18	7	7	4	17	10	+7	28	
6	Erbil	17	5	8	4	19	17	+2	23	
7	Al-Najaf	18	7	2	9	13	22	−9	23	
8	Karbala	18	5	7	6	17	16	+1	22	
9	Al-Hudood	18	2	6	10	11	23	−12	12	
10	Al-Sinaa	18	1	7	10	8	24	−16	10	Relegated to Iraqi First Division League

Source: Goalzz
Rules for classification: 1) points; 2) goal difference; 3) number of goals scored.

==== Results ====
Home \ Away	HUD	MIN	NJF	QWJ	SHR	SIN	AMN	ERB	KRB	ZAK
Al-Hudood		0–2	0–1	1–2	1–2	1–1	0–1	0–0	0–0	1–0
Al-Minaa	1–1		3–0 (Note: The Al-Minaa–Al-Najaf match was awarded as a 3–0 win to Al-Minaa, as Al-Najaf did not turn up for the game.)	1–1	2–0	4–1	0–2	3–1	2–0	1–1
Al-Najaf	2–0	1–0		0–1	3–2	1–0	0–2	1–3	1–0	0–0
Al-Quwa Al-Jawiya	2–0	1–2	3–0		2–0	0–2	3–1	2–0	1–0	0–0
Al-Shorta	1–0	0–1	2–1	1–1		1–0	1–0	2–3	1–0	1–0
Al-Sinaa	0–0	1–2	1–1	0–2	0–2		0–1	0–0	1–1	0–1
Amanat Baghdad	1–3	0–0	1–0	0–1	2–0	3–0		2–2	2–1	2–1
Erbil	1–1	3–1	2–0	– (Note: The Erbil–Al-Quwa Al-Jawiya match was postponed due to Al-Quwa Al-Jawiya's involvement in the AFC Cup, and was later cancelled due to the result having no effect on qualification or relegation.)	0–2	1–1	2–0		0–0	0–0
Karbala	3–2	3–1	0–1	1–0	1–1	3–0	1–1	1–1		1–0
Zakho	3–0	1–1	2–0	2–0	2–1	0–0	2–1	1–0	1–1	

Source: Goalzz
Legend: Blue = home team win; Yellow = draw; Red = away team win.

== Elite stage ==
The Elite Stage started on 2 April and finished on 22 May. Each team played each other just once.

Pos	Team	Pld	W	D	L	GF	GA	GD	Pts	Qualification
1	Al-Zawraa (C)	7	4	3	0	13	5	+8	15	Qualification for the AFC Cup group stage
2	Naft Al-Wasat	7	4	2	1	10	6	+4	14	Qualification for the Arab Club Championship play-off round
3	Al-Talaba	7	3	3	1	8	6	+2	12	
4	Al-Quwa Al-Jawiya	7	3	0	4	11	7	+4	9	Qualification for the AFC Cup group stage (Note: Al-Quwa Al-Jawiya qualified for the AFC Cup as Iraq FA Cup winners.)
5	Al-Naft	7	2	3	2	9	9	0	9	
6	Al-Minaa	7	2	2	3	9	13	−4	8	
7	Al-Shorta	7	1	2	4	6	12	−6	5	
8	Amanat Baghdad	7	1	1	5	6	14	−8	4	

Source: Goalzz
Rules for classification: 1) points; 2) goal difference; 3) number of goals scored.
(C) Champions

=== Results ===
Home \ Away	MIN	NFT	QWJ	SHR	TLB	ZWR	AMN	NFW
Al-Minaa			1–0	2–2			1–0	
Al-Naft	3–2			2–0	1–1		2–2	
Al-Quwa Al-Jawiya		2–0		3–0 (Note: The Al-Quwa Al-Jawiya–Al-Shorta match was awarded as a 3–0 win to Al-Quwa Al-Jawiya, as Al-Shorta did not turn up for the game.)	1–2			1–3
Al-Shorta					1–0	2–2	1–2	0–1
Al-Talaba	1–0					1–1	2–1	
Al-Zawraa	5–1	1–1	1–0					
Amanat Baghdad			0–4			0–2		1–2
Naft Al-Wasat	2–2	1–0			1–1	0–1		

Source: Goalzz
Legend: Blue = home team win; Yellow = draw; Red = away team win.

== Top scorers ==
Rank	Player	Club	Goals
1	(Iraq) Hammadi Ahmed	Al-Quwa Al-Jawiya	12
1	(Iraq) Mohannad Abdul-Raheem	Al-Zawraa	12
3	(Syria) Omar Khribin	Al-Minaa	10
3	(Iraq) Abdul-Qadir Tariq	Al-Talaba	10
5	(Iraq) Alaa Abdul-Zahra	Al-Zawraa	9

== See also ==
- 2015–16 Iraq FA Cup
