= Hussein Ali Wahid =

Iraqi footballer

Personal information
- Full name: Hussein Ali Wahid
- Date of birth: 8 October 1992 (age 34)
- Place of birth: Iraq
- Position: Attacking midfielder

Team information
- Current team: Al-Najaf FC

Youth career
- 2010–2013: Al-Najaf

Senior career*
| Years | Team | Apps | (Gls) |
| 2012–2013 | Al-Naft | | |
| 2013–2015 | Al-Mina'a | 34 | (14) |
| 2015 | Al-Shorta | 6 | (0) |
| 2015–2016 | Al-Quwa Al-Jawiya | | |
| 2016– | Al-Najaf FC | | |

International career^{‡}
| 2014-2016 | Iraq | 5 | (1) |
- * Club domestic league appearances and goals as of 28 May 2015 ‡ National team caps and goals as of 30 March 2026

Hussein Ali Wahid (Arabic: حسين علي واحد) (born 8 October 1992) is an Iraqi footballer who plays as an attacking midfielder for Al-Najaf FC.

== International debut ==
On 10 October 2014 Hussein Ali Wahid made his International debut against Yemen in a friendly match and scored the equalising 1-1 goal in the 69th minute, on his international debut.

== International statistics ==
=== Iraq national team goals ===
Scores and results list Iraq's goal tally first.

| # | Date | Venue | Opponent | Score | Result | Competition |
|---|---|---|---|---|---|---|
| 1. | 10 October 2014 | Al Ahli Stadium, Manama | Yemen | 1–1 | 1–1 | International friendly |

== Honours ==
=== Club ===
Al-Quwa Al-Jawiya

- Iraq FA Cup: 2015–16
