= Hamid Mido =

Syrian footballer (born 1993)

Hamid Mido حميد ميدو
Personal information
- Full name: Hamid Darwich Mido
- Date of birth: 3 June 1993 (age 33)
- Place of birth: Aleppo, Syria
- Height: 1.78 m (5 ft 10 in)
- Position: Midfielder

Senior career*
Years	Team	Apps	(Gls)
2010–2013	Al-Ittihad		
2013–2015	Al-Minaa	41	(8)
2015–2016	Al-Quwa Al-Jawiya	1	(0)
2017	Al-Tadamun		
2017–2018	Al-Kuwait		
2018	Al-Salmiya		
2018–2019	Al-Kuwait		
2019	Al-Ittihad		
2019–2020	Al-Shamal		
2020–2021	Al-Wahda SC		
2021–2022	Budaiya		
2022–	Al-Seeb		

International career^{‡}
2007–2008	Syria U-17		
2010–2012	Syria U-20		
2011–2012	Syria U-23		
2012–	Syria U-22		
2012–	Syria	25	(0)
- * Club domestic league appearances and goals as of 6 April 2015 ‡ National team caps and goals as of 11 June 2019

Hamid Darwich Mido (Arabic: حميد درويش ميدو; born 3 June 1993 in Syria) is a Syrian footballer. His older brother is Mohamad Mido Hamid is the first Syrian to win AFC Cup for clubs 2 times with 2 different teams, Al ittihad of Aleppo and Aire Force Iraqi club.

== Honours ==
=== Club ===
Al-Quwa Al-Jawiya

- AFC Cup: 2016
- Iraq FA Cup: 2015–16
