= Mohammed Rubat =

Iraqi footballer

Personal information
- Full name: Mohammed Jabbar Rubat
- Date of birth: 29 June 1993 (age 33)
- Place of birth: Basra, Iraq
- Height: 1.64 m (5 ft 5 in)
- Position: Right back

Senior career*
| Years | Team | Apps | (Gls) |
| 2009–2014 | Al-Minaa | 100 | (11) |
| 2014–2015 | Al-Talaba | | |
| 2015–2016 | Naft Al-Janoob | | |
| 2016–2021 | Al-Minaa | 44 | (0) |
| 2021–2024 | Naft Al-Basra | | |

International career
| 2011–2013 | Iraq U20 | 15 | (0) |
| 2013 | Iraq U23 | 4 | (0) |
| 2011–2013 | Iraq | 4 | (0) |
- * Club domestic league appearances and goals

Mohammed Jabbar Rubat Zerjawi (Arabic: محمد جبار رباط زرجاوي, born June 29, 1993, in Basra, Iraq) is an Iraqi former footballer who played as a right back for Naft Al-Basra in the Iraqi Premier League.

== International debut ==
On 26 March 2011 Rabat made his international debut for Iraq against North Korea in a friendly match.

== Honours ==
=== International ===
Iraq Youth team

- 2012 AFC U-19 Championship: runner-up
- 2013 FIFA U-20 World Cup: 4th Place

Iraq U-23

- AFC U-22 Championship: 2013

Iraq National football team

- 21st Arabian Gulf Cup: runner-up
