= North Yemen national football team results =

This page details the match results and statistics of the North Yemen national football team.

== Key ==
Key to matches

- Att.=Match attendance
- (H)=Home ground
- (A)=Away ground
- (N)=Neutral ground

Key to record by opponent

- Pld=Games played
- W=Games won
- D=Games drawn
- L=Games lost
- GF=Goals for
- GA=Goals against

== Results ==
North Yemen's score is shown first in each case.

No.	Date	Venue	Opponents	Score	Competition	North Yemen scorers	Att.	Ref.
1	2 April 1966	Al-Kashafa Stadium, Baghdad (N)	Syria	1–4	1966 Arab Cup		—	
2	4 April 1966	Al-Kashafa Stadium, Baghdad (N)	Palestine	0–7	1966 Arab Cup		—	
3	6 April 1966	Al-Kashafa Stadium, Baghdad (N)	Libya	0–14	1966 Arab Cup		—	
4	25 November 1966	Phnom Penh (N)	Palestine	3–5	1966 GANEFO	Unknown	—	
5	26 November 1966	Phnom Penh (N)	North Vietnam	0–9	1966 GANEFO		—	
6	29 November 1966	Phnom Penh (N)	Cambodia	0–8	1966 GANEFO		—	
7	30 November 1966	Phnom Penh (N)	North Korea	0–14	1966 GANEFO		—	
8	5 December 1966	Phnom Penh (N)	China	0–6	1966 GANEFO		—	
9	12 August 1973	June 11 Stadium, Tripoli (N)	Egypt	1–6	1973 Palestine Cup of Nations	Unknown	—	
10	14 August 1973	June 11 Stadium, Tripoli (N)	Palestine	0–1	1973 Palestine Cup of Nations		—	
11	16 August 1973	June 11 Stadium, Tripoli (N)	Syria	1–7	1973 Palestine Cup of Nations	Unknown	—	
12	19 August 1973	June 11 Stadium, Tripoli (N)	Tunisia	0–2	1973 Palestine Cup of Nations		—	
13	28 September 1974	Abbasiyyin Stadium, Damascus (N)	Sudan	0–6	1974 Kuneitra Cup		—	
14	30 September 1974	Abbasiyyin Stadium, Damascus (N)	Libya	1–9	1974 Kuneitra Cup	Al-Jaradi	—	
15	4 October 1974	Abbasiyyin Stadium, Damascus (N)	Syria	0–6	1974 Kuneitra Cup		—	
16	6 October 1974	Abbasiyyin Stadium, Damascus (N)	Palestine	1–7	1974 Kuneitra Cup	Nashta	—	
17	10 October 1984	Calcutta (N)	South Korea	0–6	1984 AFC Asian Cup qualification		—	
18	12 October 1984	Calcutta (N)	India	0–4	1984 AFC Asian Cup qualification		—	
19	15 October 1984	Calcutta (N)	Pakistan	1–4	1984 AFC Asian Cup qualification	Nasser	—	
20	18 October 1984	Calcutta (N)	Malaysia	1–4	1984 AFC Asian Cup qualification	Unknown	—	
21	29 March 1985	Revolution 1962 Stadium, Sanaa (H)	Syria	0–1	1986 FIFA World Cup qualification		—	
22	5 April 1985	Kuwait City (A)	Kuwait	0–5	1986 FIFA World Cup qualification		—	
23	19 April 1985	Abbasiyyin Stadium, Damascus (A)	Syria	0–3	1986 FIFA World Cup qualification		28,000	
24	26 April 1985	Revolution 1962 Stadium, Sanaa (H)	Kuwait	1–3	1986 FIFA World Cup qualification	Abbas	10,000	
25	5 August 1985	Prince Moulay Abdellah Stadium, Rabat (N)	Saudi Arabia	0–2	1985 Pan Arab Games		—	
26	8 August 1985	Prince Moulay Abdellah Stadium, Rabat (N)	Algeria	1–3	1985 Pan Arab Games	Unknown	—	
27	11 August 1985	Stade Mohammed V, Casablanca (N)	United Arab Emirates	2–1	1985 Pan Arab Games	Al-Yaremi, Ghaleb	—	
28	15 October 1985	Revolution 1962 Stadium, Sanaa (H)	Mexico	0–2	Friendly		—	
29	5 February 1988	Abu Dhabi (N)	China	0–0	1988 AFC Asian Cup qualification		—	
30	7 February 1988	Abu Dhabi (N)	United Arab Emirates	1–2	1988 AFC Asian Cup qualification	Awad Aboud	—	
31	11 February 1988	Abu Dhabi (N)	India	1–0	1988 AFC Asian Cup qualification	Al Sharani	—	
32	14 February 1988	Abu Dhabi (N)	Bangladesh	0–0	1988 AFC Asian Cup qualification		—	
33	16 February 1988	Abu Dhabi (N)	Thailand	3–3	1988 AFC Asian Cup qualification	Al-Saad, Al-Arashi, Al Sharani	—	
34	20 June 1988	Revolution 1962 Stadium, Sanaa (H)	Jordan	0–2	Friendly		—	
35	10 March 1989	Revolution 1962 Stadium, Sanaa (H)	Syria	0–1	1990 FIFA World Cup qualification		45,000	
36	20 March 1989	Revolution 1962 Stadium, Sanaa (H)	Saudi Arabia	0–1	1990 FIFA World Cup qualification		45,000	
37	25 March 1989	Latakia (A)	Syria	0–2	1990 FIFA World Cup qualification		35,000	
38	5 April 1989	Riyadh (A)	Saudi Arabia	0–1	1990 FIFA World Cup qualification		35,000	

Notes

1. Note 1: In 1990, North Yemen united with South Yemen to form Yemen. For results after 1990, see Yemen national football team results.
2. A: Palestine defeated North Yemen at the 1973 Palestine Cup of Nations, however the exact date of the match and the score is unknown.
3. B: Algeria sent their B team to the 1985 Pan Arab Games, however, their matches are considered full internationals by FIFA.

== Record by opponent ==
Team	Pld	W	D	L	GF	GA	GD	WPCT
Algeria	1	0	0	1	1	3	−2	0.00
Bangladesh	1	0	1	0	0	0	0	0.00
Cambodia	1	0	0	1	0	8	−8	0.00
China	2	0	1	1	0	6	−6	0.00
Egypt	1	0	0	1	1	6	−5	0.00
India	2	1	0	1	1	4	−3	50.00
Libya	2	0	0	2	1	23	−22	0.00
Kuwait	2	0	0	2	1	8	−7	0.00
Malaysia	1	0	0	1	1	4	−3	0.00
Mexico	1	0	0	1	0	2	−2	0.00
North Korea	1	0	0	1	0	14	−14	0.00
North Vietnam	1	0	0	1	0	9	−9	0.00
Pakistan	1	0	0	1	1	4	−3	0.00
Palestine	4	0	0	4	4	20	−16	0.00
Saudi Arabia	3	0	0	3	0	4	−4	0.00
South Korea	1	0	0	1	0	6	−6	0.00
Sudan	1	0	0	1	0	6	−6	0.00
Syria	7	0	0	7	1	27	−26	0.00
Thailand	1	0	1	0	3	3	0	0.00
Tunisia	1	0	0	1	0	2	−2	0.00
United Arab Emirates	2	1	0	1	3	3	0	50.00
Total	37	2	3	32	18	162	−144	5.41

Source: Results
