= Yemen national football team results =

This page details the match results and statistics of the Yemen national football team.

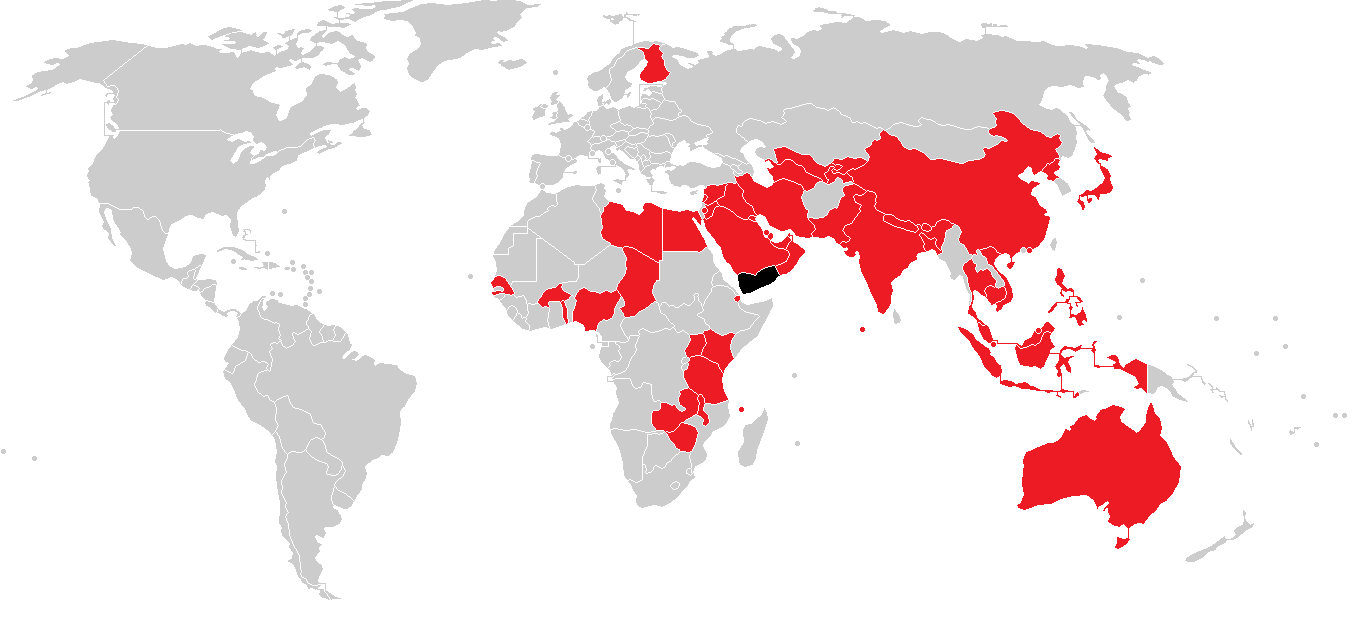
Opponents of Yemen men's national football team

== Key ==
Key to matches

- Att.=Match attendance
- (H)=Home ground
- (A)=Away ground
- (N)=Neutral ground

Key to record by opponent

- Pld=Games played
- W=Games won
- D=Games drawn
- L=Games lost
- GF=Goals for
- GA=Goals against

== Results ==
Yemen's score is shown first in each case.

No.	Date	Venue	Opponents	Score	Competition	Yemen scorers	Att.	Ref.
1	8 September 1990	Kuala Lumpur Stadium, Kuala Lumpur (A)	Malaysia	1–0	Friendly	Mahfood	—	
2	23 September 1990	Beijing Fengtai Stadium, Beijing (N)	Thailand	0–0	1990 Asian Games		—	
3	25 September 1990	Xiannongtan Stadium, Beijing (N)	Kuwait	0–0	1990 Asian Games		—	
4	27 September 1990	Xiannongtan Stadium, Beijing (N)	Hong Kong	0–2	1990 Asian Games		—	
5	22 May 1993	Al-Hassan Stadium, Irbid (N)	Jordan	1–1	1994 FIFA World Cup qualification	Shadli	—	
6	24 May 1993	Al-Hassan Stadium, Irbid (N)	Pakistan	5–1	1994 FIFA World Cup qualification	Mubarak (2), Bareed, Shadli, Abdullah	—	
7	26 May 1993	Al-Hassan Stadium, Irbid (N)	Iraq	1–6	1994 FIFA World Cup qualification	Duraiban	—	
8	28 May 1993	Al-Hassan Stadium, Irbid (N)	China	1–0	1994 FIFA World Cup qualification	Ben Rabiah	—	
9	12 June 1993	Chengdu Sports Centre, Chengdu (N)	Jordan	1–1	1994 FIFA World Cup qualification	Mahfood	—	
10	14 June 1993	Chengdu Sports Centre, Chengdu (N)	Pakistan	3–0	1994 FIFA World Cup qualification	Al-Barid (2), Abdullah	—	
11	16 June 1993	Chengdu Sports Centre, Chengdu (N)	Iraq	0–3	1994 FIFA World Cup qualification		—	
12	18 June 1993	Chengdu Sports Centre, Chengdu (N)	China	0–1	1994 FIFA World Cup qualification		—	
13	10 September 1994	Khalifa International Stadium, Doha (N)	Bangladesh	0–1	Qatar Independence Cup		—	
14	14 September 1994	Khalifa International Stadium, Doha (N)	India	1–0	Qatar Independence Cup	Unknown	—	
15	16 September 1994	Khalifa International Stadium, Doha (N)	Qatar	0–2	Qatar Independence Cup		—	
16	18 September 1994	Khalifa International Stadium, Doha (N)	India	2–0	Qatar Independence Cup	Unknown	—	
17	1 October 1994	Regional Park Stadium, Hiroshima (N)	Bahrain	0–2	1994 Asian Games		—	
18	3 October 1994	Hiroshima Stadium, Hiroshima (N)	China	0–4	1994 Asian Games		—	
19	7 October 1994	Athletic Stadium, Miyoshi (N)	Turkmenistan	0–4	1994 Asian Games		—	
20	9 October 1994	Athletic Stadium, Miyoshi (N)	Iran	0–4	1994 Asian Games		—	
21	26 January 1996	King Fahd International Stadium, Riyadh (N)	Kyrgyzstan	1–0	1996 AFC Asian Cup qualification	Noman	1,000	
22	28 January 1996	King Fahd International Stadium, Riyadh (N)	Saudi Arabia	0–4	1996 AFC Asian Cup qualification		—	
23	2 February 1996	King Fahd International Stadium, Riyadh (N)	Kyrgyzstan	1–3	1996 AFC Asian Cup qualification	Ben Rabiah	1,000	
24	4 February 1996	King Fahd International Stadium, Riyadh (N)	Saudi Arabia	0–1	1996 AFC Asian Cup qualification		—	
25	13 April 1997	Gelora Bung Karno Stadium, Jakarta (A)	Indonesia	0–0	1998 FIFA World Cup qualification		25,000	
26	20 April 1997	Phnom Penh Olympic Stadium, Phnom Penh (A)	Cambodia	1–0	1998 FIFA World Cup qualification	Dariban	20,000	
27	9 May 1997	Althawra Sports City Stadium, Sanaa (H)	Uzbekistan	0–1	1998 FIFA World Cup qualification		28,000	
28	16 May 1997	Althawra Sports City Stadium, Sanaa (H)	Cambodia	7–0	1998 FIFA World Cup qualification	Al Ariki (4), Noman, Bashafal, Abdulla	40,000	
29	13 June 1997	Althawra Sports City Stadium, Sanaa (H)	Indonesia	1–1	1998 FIFA World Cup qualification	Al Ariki	35,000	
30	24 August 1997	Pakhtakor Central Stadium, Tashkent (A)	Uzbekistan	1–5	1998 FIFA World Cup qualification	Zughair	20,000	
31	10 February 2000	Mohammed Al-Hamad Stadium, Kuwait City (N)	Nepal	3–0	2000 AFC Asian Cup qualification	Tahous, Al-Nono, Al-Salimi	—	
32	12 February 2000	Mohammed Al-Hamad Stadium, Kuwait City (N)	Turkmenistan	0–1	2000 AFC Asian Cup qualification		—	
33	16 February 2000	Mohammed Al-Hamad Stadium, Kuwait City (N)	Kuwait	0–2	2000 AFC Asian Cup qualification		—	
34	18 February 2000	Mohammed Al-Hamad Stadium, Kuwait City (N)	Bhutan	11–2	2000 AFC Asian Cup qualification	Briek, Al-Salimi (2), Al-Nono (3), Tahous (2), Al Gharbani (2), Al-Kahta	—	
35	29 October 2000	Muscat (A)	Oman	0–4	Friendly		—	
36	31 October 2000	Muscat (A)	Oman	0–4	Friendly		—	
37	7 April 2001	Hassanal Bolkiah National Stadium, Bandar Seri Begawan (A)	Brunei	5–0	2002 FIFA World Cup qualification	Ahmed, Al-Salimi, Awad, Al-Nono (2)	6,000	
38	15 April 2001	Bangalore Football Stadium, Bangalore (A)	India	1–1	2002 FIFA World Cup qualification	Al Ghurbani	21,000	
39	27 April 2001	Althawra Sports City Stadium, Sanaa (H)	Brunei	1–0	2002 FIFA World Cup qualification	Al Ghurbani	30,000	
40	4 May 2001	Althawra Sports City Stadium, Sanaa (H)	India	3–3	2002 FIFA World Cup qualification	Al-Salimi (3)	25,000	
41	11 May 2001	Althawra Sports City Stadium, Sanaa (H)	United Arab Emirates	2–1	2002 FIFA World Cup qualification	Al Ghurbani, Al-Nono	17,000	
42	18 May 2001	Sheikh Khalifa International Stadium, Al Ain (A)	United Arab Emirates	2–3	2002 FIFA World Cup qualification	Al-Nono, Al-Salimi	20,000	
43	10 April 2002	Althawra Sports City Stadium, Sanaa (H)	Ethiopia	1–1	Friendly	Unknown	—	
44	17 December 2002	Al Kuwait Sports Club Stadium, Kuwait City (N)	Syria	0–4	2002 Arab Cup		300	
45	21 December 2002	Al Kuwait Sports Club Stadium, Kuwait City (N)	Bahrain	1–3	2002 Arab Cup	Al-Salimi	1,000	
46	24 December 2002	Al Kuwait Sports Club Stadium, Kuwait City (N)	Lebanon	2–4	2002 Arab Cup	Al-Qadimi, Abboud	1,000	
47	26 December 2002	Al Kuwait Sports Club Stadium, Kuwait City (N)	Saudi Arabia	2–2	2002 Arab Cup	Al-Salimi, Saeed	—	
48	17 September 2003	Althawra Sports City Stadium, Sanaa (H)	Sudan	3–2	Friendly	Al-Sherhi, Al-Mang, Yousef	—	
49	19 September 2003	Althawra Sports City Stadium, Sanaa (H)	Sudan	1–2	Friendly	Unknown	—	
50	27 September 2003	Jeddah (N)	Syria	2–8	Friendly	Unknown	—	
51	6 October 2003	Prince Abdullah Al Faisal Stadium, Jeddah (N)	Saudi Arabia	0–7	2004 AFC Asian Cup qualification		—	
52	8 October 2003	Prince Abdullah Al Faisal Stadium, Jeddah (N)	Indonesia	0–3	2004 AFC Asian Cup qualification		—	
53	10 October 2003	Prince Abdullah Al Faisal Stadium, Jeddah (N)	Bhutan	8–0	2004 AFC Asian Cup qualification	Basuhai (3), Al-Hubaishi, Al-Sherhi, Al-Salimi (2), Aziz	—	
54	13 October 2003	Prince Abdullah Al Faisal Stadium, Jeddah (N)	Saudi Arabia	1–3	2004 AFC Asian Cup qualification	Basuhai	—	
55	15 October 2003	Prince Abdullah Al Faisal Stadium, Jeddah (N)	Indonesia	2–2	2004 AFC Asian Cup qualification	Al-Salimi, Al-Amki	—	
56	17 October 2003	Prince Abdullah Al Faisal Stadium, Jeddah (N)	Bhutan	4–0	2004 AFC Asian Cup qualification	Al-Jajjam (2), Al-Amki, Al-Salimi	—	
57	28 December 2003	Al-Sadaqua Walsalam Stadium, Kuwait City (N)	Oman	1–1	16th Arabian Gulf Cup	Jamal	—	
58	30 December 2003	Al-Sadaqua Walsalam Stadium, Kuwait City (N)	Bahrain	1–5	16th Arabian Gulf Cup	Al-Salimi	—	
59	1 January 2004	Al-Sadaqua Walsalam Stadium, Kuwait City (N)	Kuwait	0–4	16th Arabian Gulf Cup		—	
60	5 January 2004	Al-Sadaqua Walsalam Stadium, Kuwait City (N)	Qatar	0–3	16th Arabian Gulf Cup		—	
61	8 January 2004	Al-Sadaqua Walsalam Stadium, Kuwait City (N)	Saudi Arabia	0–2	16th Arabian Gulf Cup		—	
62	11 January 2004	Al-Sadaqua Walsalam Stadium, Kuwait City (N)	United Arab Emirates	0–3	16th Arabian Gulf Cup		—	
63	18 February 2004	Althawra Sports City Stadium, Sanaa (H)	North Korea	1–1	2006 FIFA World Cup qualification	Al-Selwi	15,000	
64	17 March 2004	Althawra Sports City Stadium, Sanaa (H)	Turkmenistan	1–2	Friendly	Unknown	—	
65	31 March 2004	Althawra Sports City Stadium, Sanaa (H)	Thailand	0–3	2006 FIFA World Cup qualification		25,000	
66	9 June 2004	Sheikh Khalifa International Stadium, Al Ain (A)	United Arab Emirates	0–3	2006 FIFA World Cup qualification		5,000	
67	26 August 2004	Althawra Sports City Stadium, Sanaa (H)	Syria	1–2	Friendly	Unknown	—	
68	28 August 2004	Althawra Sports City Stadium, Sanaa (H)	Syria	2–1	Friendly	Unknown	—	
69	8 September 2004	Althawra Sports City Stadium, Sanaa (H)	United Arab Emirates	3–1	2006 FIFA World Cup qualification	Al-Nono (2), Abduljabbar	17,000	
70	13 October 2004	Yanggakdo Stadium, Pyongyang (A)	North Korea	1–2	2006 FIFA World Cup qualification	Jaber	15,000	
71	1 November 2004	Police Officers' Club Stadium, Dubai (N)	Zambia	2–2	Friendly	Al-Nono, Al-Qor	—	
72	17 November 2004	Rajamangala Stadium, Bangkok (A)	Thailand	1–1	2006 FIFA World Cup qualification	Al-Sherhi	15,000	
73	3 December 2004	Maktoum bin Rashid Al Maktoum Stadium, Dubai (N)	Iraq	1–3	Friendly	Aziz	—	
74	5 December 2004	Al-Sadaqua Walsalam Stadium, Doha (A)	Qatar	0–3	Friendly		—	
75	11 December 2004	Ahmed bin Ali Stadium, Al Rayyan (N)	Bahrain	1–1	17th Arabian Gulf Cup	Ghazi	—	
76	14 December 2004	Ahmed bin Ali Stadium, Al Rayyan (N)	Saudi Arabia	0–2	17th Arabian Gulf Cup		—	
77	17 December 2004	Jassim bin Hamad Stadium, Doha (N)	Kuwait	0–3	17th Arabian Gulf Cup		—	
78	9 April 2005	Prince Abdullah al-Faisal Stadium, Jeddah (N)	Saudi Arabia	0–4	2005 Islamic Solidarity Games		—	
79	13 April 2005	Prince Abdullah al-Faisal Stadium, Jeddah (N)	Palestine	3–1	2005 Islamic Solidarity Games	Unknown	—	
80	22 February 2006	Althawra Sports City Stadium, Sanaa (H)	Saudi Arabia	0–4	2007 AFC Asian Cup qualification		55,000	
81	1 March 2006	Ambedkar Stadium, New Delhi (A)	India	3–0	2007 AFC Asian Cup qualification	Abdullah, Al-Hubaishi, Al-Nono	8,000	
82	17 July 2006	Addis Ababa Stadium, Addis Ababa (A)	Ethiopia	0–1	Friendly		—	
83	16 August 2006	Niigata Stadium, Niigata (A)	Japan	0–2	2007 AFC Asian Cup qualification		40,913	
84	26 August 2006	Althawra Sports City Stadium, Sanaa (H)	Libya	0–1	Friendly		—	
85	29 August 2006	Althawra Sports City Stadium, Sanaa (H)	Libya	1–1	Friendly	Unknown	—	
86	6 September 2006	Althawra Sports City Stadium, Sanaa (H)	Japan	0–1	2007 AFC Asian Cup qualification		7,000	
87	11 October 2006	Prince Abdullah al-Faisal Stadium, Jeddah (A)	Saudi Arabia	0–5	2007 AFC Asian Cup qualification		1,500	
88	15 November 2006	Althawra Sports City Stadium, Sanaa (H)	India	2–1	2007 AFC Asian Cup qualification	Al-Haggam, Al-Nono	5,500	
89	14 December 2006	Althawra Sports City Stadium, Sanaa (N)	Comoros	2–0	2009 Arab Cup qualification	Al-Haggam (2)	—	
90	20 December 2006	Althawra Sports City Stadium, Sanaa (N)	Djibouti	4–1	2009 Arab Cup qualification	Al-Sasi, Nasser, Al-Hubaishi, Al Tahoos	—	
91	7 January 2007	Althawra Sports City Stadium, Sanaa (H)	Eritrea	4–1	Friendly	A. Al-Worafi, Al-Haggam, Al-Hubaishi, Ba Suhai	—	
92	12 January 2007	Maktoum bin Rashid Al Maktoum Stadium, Dubai (N)	Bahrain	0–4	Friendly		—	
93	17 January 2007	Zayed Sports City Stadium, Abu Dhabi (N)	Kuwait	1–1	18th Arabian Gulf Cup	Al-Omqi	—	
94	20 January 2007	Mohammed bin Zayed Stadium, Abu Dhabi (N)	United Arab Emirates	1–2	18th Arabian Gulf Cup	Ghazi	—	
95	23 January 2007	Al Nahyan Stadium, Abu Dhabi (N)	Oman	1–2	18th Arabian Gulf Cup	Al-Zuraqi	—	
96	8 October 2007	Althawra Sports City Stadium, Sanaa (H)	Maldives	3–0	2010 FIFA World Cup qualification	Salem, Al-Hubaishi, Thabit	3,000	
97	28 October 2007	Galolhu Football Stadium, Malé (A)	Maldives	0–2	2010 FIFA World Cup qualification		8,900	
98	9 November 2007	Althawra Sports City Stadium, Sanaa (H)	Thailand	1–1	2010 FIFA World Cup qualification	Al-Nono	12,000	
99	18 November 2007	Supachalasai Stadium, Bangkok (A)	Thailand	0–1	2010 FIFA World Cup qualification		29,000	
100	26 January 2008	Bahrain National Stadium, Riffa (A)	Bahrain	1–2	Friendly	Basuhai	—	
101	4 April 2008	Althawra Sports City Stadium, Sanaa (H)	Tanzania	2–1	Friendly	Yaslam (2)	—	
102	25 April 2008	Siliwangi Stadium, Badung (A)	Indonesia	0–1	Friendly		—	
103	3 May 2008	Nizwa Sports Complex, Nizwa (A)	Oman	0–0	Friendly		—	
104	22 May 2008	Althawra Sports City Stadium, Sanaa (H)	Sudan	1–1	Friendly	Unknown	—	
105	28 December 2008	Althawra Sports City Stadium, Sanaa (H)	Zimbabwe	1–0	Friendly	Al-Nono	—	
106	30 December 2008	Althawra Sports City Stadium, Sanaa (H)	Zimbabwe	0–1	Friendly		—	
107	5 January 2009	Royal Oman Police Stadium, Muscat (N)	United Arab Emirates	1–3	19th Arabian Gulf Cup	Al-Nono	—	
108	8 January 2009	Royal Oman Police Stadium, Muscat (N)	Saudi Arabia	0–6	19th Arabian Gulf Cup		—	
109	11 January 2009	Royal Oman Police Stadium, Muscat (N)	Qatar	1–2	19th Arabian Gulf Cup	Al-Nono	—	
110	20 January 2009	Kumamoto Athletics Stadium, Kumamoto (A)	Japan	1–2	2011 AFC Asian Cup qualification	Al-Fadhli	30,654	
111	28 January 2009	Althawra Sports City Stadium, Sanaa (H)	Hong Kong	1–0	2011 AFC Asian Cup qualification	Al-Selwi	10,000	
112	8 November 2009	Althawra Sports City Stadium, Sanaa (H)	Tanzania	1–1	Friendly	Yousef	—	
113	11 November 2009	Althawra Sports City Stadium, Sanaa (H)	Tanzania	2–1	Friendly	A. Al-Worafi, Hansah	—	
114	18 November 2009	Bahrain National Stadium, Riffa (A)	Bahrain	0–4	2011 AFC Asian Cup qualification		1,000	
115	30 December 2009	Althawra Sports City Stadium, Sanaa (H)	Tajikistan	2–1	Friendly	Baleid, Al-Nono	—	
116	2 January 2010	Althawra Sports City Stadium, Sanaa (H)	Tajikistan	0–1	Friendly		—	
117	6 January 2010	Althawra Sports City Stadium, Sanaa (H)	Japan	2–3	2011 AFC Asian Cup qualification	Al-Aqel, Abbod	10,000	
118	15 January 2010	Althawra Sports City Stadium, Sanaa (H)	Kenya	3–1	Friendly	Al-Nono, Al-Sasi (2)	—	
119	20 January 2010	Althawra Sports City Stadium, Sanaa (H)	Bahrain	3–0	2011 AFC Asian Cup qualification	Al-Nono (2), Al Abidi	7,000	
120	27 February 2010	Bukit Jalil National Stadium, Kuala Lumpur (H)	Malaysia	0–1	Friendly		—	
121	3 March 2010	Hong Kong Stadium, Hong Kong (A)	Hong Kong	0–0	2011 AFC Asian Cup qualification		1,212	
122	12 May 2010	Althawra Sports City Stadium, Sanaa (H)	Malawi	1–0	Friendly	Ba Haj	—	
123	18 May 2010	Althawra Sports City Stadium, Sanaa (H)	Oman	0–1	Unity Cup		—	
124	7 September 2010	Althawra Sports City Stadium, Sanaa (H)	Syria	2–1	Friendly	Al-Nono (2)	—	
125	18 September 2010	Althawra Sports City Stadium, Sanaa (H)	Zambia	0–1	Friendly		—	
126	25 September 2010	King Abdullah II Stadium, Amman (N)	Iraq	1–2	2010 WAFF Championship	Al-Nono	8,000	
127	27 September 2010	King Abdullah II Stadium, Amman (N)	Palestine	3–1	2010 WAFF Championship	Al-Nono (2), Al-Asbahi	10,000	
128	1 October 2010	King Abdullah II Stadium, Amman (N)	Kuwait	1–1 (3–4p)	2010 WAFF Championship	Al-Nono	3,000	
129	13 October 2010	Shree Shiv Chhatrapati Sports Complex, Pune (A)	India	6–3	Friendly	Al-Asbahi, Baleid, A. Al-Worafi, Al-Sasi (2), Basuhai	—	
130	7 November 2010	Althawra Sports City Stadium, Sanaa (H)	Uganda	2–2	Friendly	Al-Nono (2)	—	
131	10 November 2010	Althawra Sports City Stadium, Sanaa (H)	North Korea	1–1	Friendly	A. Al-Worafi	—	
132	22 November 2010	22 May Stadium, Aden (N)	Saudi Arabia	0–4	20th Arabian Gulf Cup		—	
133	25 November 2010	Al-Wahda Stadium, Zinjibar (N)	Qatar	1–2	20th Arabian Gulf Cup	A. Al-Worafi	—	
134	28 November 2010	Al-Wahda Stadium, Zinjibar (N)	Kuwait	0–3	20th Arabian Gulf Cup		—	
135	8 July 2011	Atatürk Olympic Stadium, Istanbul (N)	Jordan	0–4	Friendly		—	
136	23 July 2011	Franso Hariri Stadium, Arbil (A)	Iraq	0–2	2014 FIFA World Cup qualification		20,000	
137	28 July 2011	Khalifa bin Zayed Stadium, Al Ain (H)	Iraq	0–0	2014 FIFA World Cup qualification		1,500	
138	18 June 2012	Althawra Sports City Stadium, Sanaa (H)	Palestine	1–2	Friendly	Al Khamri	—	
139	23 June 2012	Prince Abdullah Al-Faisal Stadium, Jeddah (N)	Libya	1–3	2012 Arab Nations Cup	Al-Sasi	—	
140	26 June 2012	Prince Abdullah Al-Faisal Stadium, Jeddah (N)	Bahrain	2–0	2012 Arab Nations Cup	Al-Selwi, Ba Rowis	—	
141	28 September 2012	Sultan Qaboos Sports Complex, Muscat (A)	Oman	1–2	Friendly	E. Al-Worafi	—	
142	16 October 2012	Saida Municipal Stadium, Sidon (A)	Lebanon	1–2	Friendly	Omar	—	
143	9 December 2012	Ali Sabah Al-Salem Stadium, Ardiya (N)	Bahrain	0–1	2012 WAFF Championship		150	
144	12 December 2012	Ali Sabah Al-Salem Stadium, Ardiya (N)	Saudi Arabia	0–1	2012 WAFF Championship		1,000	
145	15 December 2012	Al-Sadaqua Walsalam Stadium, Kuwait City (N)	Iran	1–2	2012 WAFF Championship	E. Al-Worafi	500	
146	25 December 2012	Khalifa International Stadium, Doha (N)	United Arab Emirates	0–2	Friendly		—	
147	29 December 2012	Khalifa International Stadium, Doha (N)	United Arab Emirates	1–3	Friendly	Al Abidi	—	
148	6 January 2013	Khalifa Sports City Stadium, Isa Town (N)	Kuwait	0–2	21st Arabian Gulf Cup		10,000	
149	9 January 2013	Khalifa Sports City Stadium, Isa Town (N)	Saudi Arabia	0–2	21st Arabian Gulf Cup		15,000	
150	12 January 2013	Khalifa Sports City Stadium, Isa Town (N)	Iraq	0–2	21st Arabian Gulf Cup		10,000	
151	6 February 2013	Sharjah Stadium, Sharjah (H)	Bahrain	0–2	2015 AFC Asian Cup qualification		450	
152	22 March 2013	Shah Alam Stadium, Shah Alam (A)	Malaysia	1–2	2015 AFC Asian Cup qualification	Al-Hagri	80,000	
153	6 October 2013	Camille Chamoun Sports City Stadium, Beirut (N)	Iraq	2–3	Friendly	Hanash, E. Al-Worafi	—	
154	13 October 2013	Thani bin Jassim Stadium, Al Rayyan (A)	Qatar	0–6	2015 AFC Asian Cup qualification		11,920	
155	15 November 2013	Khalifa bin Zayed Stadium, Al Ain (H)	Qatar	1–4	2015 AFC Asian Cup qualification	Al-Sasi	350	
156	19 November 2013	Bahrain National Stadium, Riffa (A)	Bahrain	0–2	2015 AFC Asian Cup qualification		600	
157	5 March 2014	Tahnoun bin Mohammed Stadium, Al Ain (H)	Malaysia	1–2	2015 AFC Asian Cup qualification	Al-Sarori	311	
158	25 March 2014	Grand Hamad Stadium, Doha (N)	Nepal	2–0	Friendly	Mohammed, Ba Rowis	—	
159	15 April 2014	Grand Hamad Stadium, Doha (N)	Chad	0–0	Friendly		—	
160	9 September 2014	Maguwoharjo Stadium, Sleman Regency (A)	Indonesia	0–0	Friendly		—	
161	10 October 2014	Al Ahli Stadium, Manama (N)	Iraq	1–1	Friendly	Al-Hagari	—	
162	4 November 2014	Al Nahyan Stadium, Abu Dhabi (N)	Kuwait	1–1	Friendly	Al-Jarshi	—	
163	7 November 2014	Sultan Qaboos Sports Complex, Muscat (A)	Oman	0–2	Friendly		—	
164	13 November 2014	King Fahd International Stadium, Riyadh (N)	Bahrain	0–0	22nd Arabian Gulf Cup		—	
165	16 November 2014	King Fahd International Stadium, Riyadh (N)	Qatar	0–0	22nd Arabian Gulf Cup		—	
166	19 November 2014	King Fahd International Stadium, Riyadh (N)	Saudi Arabia	0–1	22nd Arabian Gulf Cup		—	
167	22 January 2015	Police Officers' Club Stadium, Dubai (N)	Finland	0–0	Friendly		—	
168	12 March 2015	Grand Hamad Stadium, Doha (H)	Pakistan	3–1	2018 FIFA World Cup qualification	Al-Matari, Boqshan, Al-Sasi	300	
169	23 March 2015	Khalifa Sports City Stadium, Isa Town (A)	Pakistan	0–0	2018 FIFA World Cup qualification		2,200	
170	11 June 2015	Suheim bin Hamad Stadium, Doha (H)	North Korea	0–3	2018 FIFA World Cup qualification		3,200	
171	16 June 2015	Suheim bin Hamad Stadium, Doha (H)	Philippines	0–2	2018 FIFA World Cup qualification		5,200	
172	28 August 2015	Al-Seeb Stadium, Seeb (A)	Oman	0–1	Friendly		—	
173	3 September 2015	Pakhtakor Central Stadium, Tashkent (A)	Uzbekistan	0–1	2018 FIFA World Cup qualification		15,000	
174	8 September 2015	Grand Hamad Stadium, Doha (H)	Bahrain	0–4	2018 FIFA World Cup qualification		421	
175	13 October 2015	Kim Il Sung Stadium, Pyongyang (A)	North Korea	0–1	2018 FIFA World Cup qualification		41,000	
176	12 November 2015	Rizal Memorial Stadium, Manila (A)	Philippines	1–0	2018 FIFA World Cup qualification	Al-Sarori	6,478	
177	17 November 2015	Grand Hamad Stadium, Doha (H)	Uzbekistan	1–3	2018 FIFA World Cup qualification	Al-Sarori	350	
178	24 March 2016	Bahrain National Stadium, Riffa (A)	Bahrain	0–3	2018 FIFA World Cup qualification		1,000	
179	2 June 2016	National Football Stadium, Malé (A)	Maldives	2–0	2019 AFC Asian Cup qualification	Al-Hagri, Al-Worafi	2,600	
180	7 June 2016	Grand Hamad Stadium, Doha (H)	Maldives	2–0	2019 AFC Asian Cup qualification	Al-Matari, Samooh (o.g.)	200	
181	22 March 2017	Saoud bin Abdulrahman Stadium, Al Wakrah (N)	Palestine	0–1	Friendly		—	
182	28 March 2017	Suheim Bin Hamad Stadium, Doha (H)	Tajikistan	2–1	2019 AFC Asian Cup qualification	Ergashev (o.g.), Al-Sasi	380	
183	13 June 2017	Halchowk Stadium, Kathmandu (A)	Nepal	0–0	2019 AFC Asian Cup qualification		700	
184	5 September 2017	Panaad Park and Stadium, Bacolod (A)	Philippines	2–2	2019 AFC Asian Cup qualification	Al-Radaei, Al-Matari	2,911	
185	10 October 2017	Saoud bin Abdulrahman Stadium, Al Wakrah (H)	Philippines	1–1	2019 AFC Asian Cup qualification	Mansour	2,169	
186	14 November 2017	Hisor Central Stadium, Hisor (A)	Tajikistan	0–0	2019 AFC Asian Cup qualification		12,000	
187	15 December 2017	Sultan Qaboos Sports Complex, Muscat (A)	Oman	0–1	Friendly		—	
188	23 December 2017	Al Kuwait Sports Club Stadium, Kuwait City (N)	Qatar	0–4	23rd Arabian Gulf Cup		—	
189	26 December 2017	Al Kuwait Sports Club Stadium, Kuwait City (N)	Bahrain	0–1	23rd Arabian Gulf Cup		—	
190	29 December 2017	Al Kuwait Sports Club Stadium, Kuwait City (N)	Iraq	0–3	23rd Arabian Gulf Cup		—	
191	27 March 2018	Suheim Bin Hamad Stadium, Doha (H)	Nepal	2–1	2019 AFC Asian Cup qualification	Al-Matari (2)	7,535	
192	16 November 2018	Prince Mohamed bin Fahd Stadium, Dammam (A)	Saudi Arabia	0–1	Friendly		7,000	
193	20 November 2018	Zabeel Stadium, Dubai (A)	United Arab Emirates	0–2	Friendly		—	
194	30 December 2018	Zayed Sports City Stadium, Abu Dhabi (N)	Syria	0–1	Friendly		—	
195	7 January 2019	Mohammed bin Zayed Stadium, Abu Dhabi (N)	Iran	0–5	2019 AFC Asian Cup		5,301	
196	12 January 2019	Sharjah Stadium, Sharjah (N)	Iraq	0–3	2019 AFC Asian Cup		9,757	
197	16 January 2019	Al Maktoum Stadium, Dubai (N)	Vietnam	0–2	2019 AFC Asian Cup		8,237	
198	30 July 2019	Karbala Sports City, Karbala (N)	Palestine	0–1	2019 WAFF Championship		200	
199	5 August 2019	Karbala Sports City, Karbala (N)	Syria	1–1	2019 WAFF Championship	Qarawi	155	
200	8 August 2019	Karbala Sports City, Karbala (N)	Lebanon	2–1	2019 WAFF Championship	Mansoor, Al-Matari	10,000	
201	11 August 2019	Karbala Sports City, Karbala (N)	Iraq	1–2	2019 WAFF Championship	Al-Matari	11,213	
202	28 August 2019	Al-Seeb Stadium, Seeb (A)	Oman	0–1	Friendly		—	
203	5 September 2019	National Stadium, Kallang (A)	Singapore	2–2	2022 FIFA World Cup qualification	Al-Matari, Qarawi	7,018	
204	10 September 2019	Bahrain National Stadium, Riffa (H)	Saudi Arabia	2–2	2022 FIFA World Cup qualification	Qarawi, O. Al-Dahi	3,100	
205	10 October 2019	Pakhtakor Central Stadium, Tashkent (A)	Uzbekistan	0–5	2022 FIFA World Cup qualification		28,571	
206	14 November 2019	Sheikh Ali bin Mohammed Stadium, Muharraq (H)	Palestine	1–0	2022 FIFA World Cup qualification	O. Al-Dahi	530	
207	19 November 2019	Sheikh Ali bin Mohammed Stadium, Muharraq (H)	Singapore	1–2	2022 FIFA World Cup qualification	Al-Gahwashi	650	
208	26 November 2019	Abdullah bin Khalifa Stadium, Doha (N)	United Arab Emirates	0–3	24th Arabian Gulf Cup		1,437	
209	29 November 2019	Khalifa International Stadium, Doha (N)	Qatar	0–6	24th Arabian Gulf Cup		26,392	
210	2 December 2019	Abdullah bin Khalifa Stadium, Doha (N)	Iraq	0–0	24th Arabian Gulf Cup		—	
211	5 June 2021	King Saud University Stadium, Riyadh (A)	Saudi Arabia	0–3	2022 FIFA World Cup qualification		4,382	
212	11 June 2021	King Fahd International Stadium, Riyadh (H)	Uzbekistan	0–1	2022 FIFA World Cup qualification		230	
213	15 June 2021	King Fahd International Stadium, Riyadh (A)	Palestine	0–3	2022 FIFA World Cup qualification		430	
214	22 June 2021	Jassim bin Hamad Stadium, Doha (N)	Mauritania	0–2	2021 FIFA Arab Cup		187	
215	8 June 2022	MFF Football Centre, Ulaanbaatar (N)	Philippines	0–0	2023 AFC Asian Cup qualification		25	
216	11 June 2022	MFF Football Centre, Ulaanbaatar (N)	Palestine	0–5	2023 AFC Asian Cup qualification		21	
217	14 June 2022	MFF Football Centre, Ulaanbaatar (N)	Mongolia	0–2	2023 AFC Asian Cup qualification		1,567	
218	6 January 2023	Basra International Stadium, Basra (N)	Saudi Arabia	0–2	25th Arabian Gulf Cup		—	
219	9 January 2023	Basra International Stadium, Basra (N)	Oman	2–3	25th Arabian Gulf Cup	Al-Matari, O. Al-Dahi	—	
220	12 January 2023	Basra International Stadium, Basra (N)	Iraq	0–5	25th Arabian Gulf Cup		—	
221	12 October 2023	Damac Club Stadium, Khamis Mushait (H)	Sri Lanka	3–0	2026 FIFA World Cup qualification	Maher, Al-Gahwashi, Al-Matari	1,526	
222	17 October 2023	Colombo Racecourse, Colombo (A)	Sri Lanka	1–1	2026 FIFA World Cup qualification	Al-Matari	3,000	
223	16 November 2023	Prince Sultan bin Abdulaziz Sports City Stadium, Abha (H)	Bahrain	0–2	2026 FIFA World Cup qualification		1,291	
224	21 November 2023	Dasharath Rangasala, Kathmandu (A)	Nepal	2–0	2026 FIFA World Cup qualification	O. Al-Dahi, M. Al-Dahi	13,735	
225	21 March 2024	Al Nahyan Stadium, Abu Dhabi (A)	United Arab Emirates	1–2	2026 FIFA World Cup qualification	Idrees (o.g.)	2,948	
226	26 March 2024	Prince Saud bin Jalawi Sports City Stadium, Khobar (H)	United Arab Emirates	0–3	2026 FIFA World Cup qualification		1,135	
227	6 June 2024	Bahrain National Stadium, Riffa (A)	Bahrain	0–0	2026 FIFA World Cup qualification		2,632	
228	11 June 2024	Prince Mohamed bin Fahd Stadium, Dammam (H)	Nepal	2–2	2026 FIFA World Cup qualification	Al-Gahwashi, M. Al-Dahi	905	
229	16 November 2024	Al-Khor SC Stadium, Al Khor (N)	Sri Lanka	0–1	Friendly		—	
230	19 November 2024	Al-Khor SC Stadium, Al Khor (N)	Sri Lanka	2–0	Friendly	Mahross, Hasan	—	
231	9 December 2024	Abdullah bin Khalifa Stadium, Doha (N)	Kuwait	1–1	Friendly	Sabarah	—	
232	16 December 2024	Sultan Qaboos Sports Complex, Muscat (A)	Oman	0–1	Friendly		—	
233	22 December 2024	Sulaibikhat Stadium, Sulaibikhat (N)	Iraq	0–1	26th Arabian Gulf Cup		7,203	
234	25 December 2024	Sulaibikhat Stadium, Sulaibikhat (N)	Saudi Arabia	2–3	26th Arabian Gulf Cup	Al-Zubaidi, Sabarah	9,200	
235	28 December 2024	Sulaibikhat Stadium, Sulaibikhat (N)	Bahrain	2–1	26th Arabian Gulf Cup	Al-Khatal, Al-Zubaidi	4,293	
236	25 March 2025	Changlimithang Stadium, Thimphu (A)	Bhutan	0–0	2027 AFC Asian Cup qualification		4,700	
237	10 June 2025	Jaber Al-Mubarak Al-Hamad Stadium, Sulaibikhat (H)	Lebanon	0–0	2027 AFC Asian Cup qualification		1,512	
238	9 October 2025	Hassanal Bolkiah National Stadium, Bandar Seri Begawan (A)	Brunei	2–0	2027 AFC Asian Cup qualification	Al-Matari, Al-Gahwashi	1,529	
239	14 October 2025	Jaber Al-Ahmad International Stadium, Kuwait City (H)	Brunei	9–0	2027 AFC Asian Cup qualification	Al-Gahwashi (5), Al-Dahi (2), Masnom, Sabara	755	
240	18 November 2025	Ali Sabah Al-Salem Stadium, Farwaniya (H)	Bhutan	7–1	2027 AFC Asian Cup qualification	Al-Zubaidi, Al-Gahwashi (4), Qasem, Al-Golan	350	
241	26 November 2025	Grand Hamad Stadium, Doha (N)	Comoros	4–4 (2–4p)	2025 FIFA Arab Cup qualification	Al-Zubaidi, Al-Gahwashi, Al-Matari (2)	1,342	
242	4 June 2026	Grand Hamad Stadium, Doha (N)	Lebanon	2–0	2027 AFC Asian Cup qualification			

Notes

1. A: Due to security concerns, Yemen played their home match during qualifying for the 2014 FIFA World Cup in Al Ain, United Arab Emirates.
2. B: Due to security concerns, Yemen played their home matches during qualifying for the 2015 AFC Asian Cup in Sharjah and Al Ain, United Arab Emirates.
3. C: Due to security concerns, Yemen played their home matches during qualifying for the 2018 FIFA World Cup in Doha, Qatar.
4. D: Due to security concerns, Pakistan played their home match during qualifying for the 2018 FIFA World Cup in Isa Town, Bahrain.
5. E: North Korea were awarded a technical 3–0 win after Yemen had fielded an ineligible player, Mudir Al-Radaei, who had failed to serve a suspension correctly. The match had originally finished 1–0 to North Korea.
6. F: Due to security concerns, Yemen played their home matches during qualifying for the 2019 AFC Asian Cup in Doha and Al Wakrah, Qatar.
7. G: Due to security concerns, Yemen initially played their home matches during qualifying for the 2022 FIFA World Cup in Riffa and Muharraq, Bahrain.
8. H: Due to the COVID-19 pandemic in Asia, matches due to be played in March and June 2020 were held at a central venue in June 2021. As a result, Yemen played their home match against Uzbekistan and Palestine played their home match against Yemen in Riyadh, Saudi Arabia.
9. I: Due to security concerns, Yemen played their home matches during qualifying for the 2026 FIFA World Cup in Khamis Mushait, Abha, Khobar and Dammam, Saudi Arabia.
10. J: Due to security concerns, Yemen played their home matches during qualifying for the 2027 AFC Asian Cup in Sulaibikhat, Kuwait City and Farwaniya, Kuwait.

== Record by opponent ==
Team	Pld	W	D	L	GF	GA	GD	WPCT
Bahrain	19	3	3	13	11	37	−26	15.79
Bangladesh	1	0	0	1	0	1	−1	0.00
Bhutan	6	5	1	0	31	3	+28	83.33
Brunei	3	3	0	0	16	0	+16	100.00
Cambodia	2	2	0	0	8	0	+8	100.00
Chad	1	0	1	0	0	0	0	0.00
China	3	1	0	2	1	5	−4	33.33
Comoros	2	1	1	0	6	4	+2	50.00
Djibouti	1	1	0	0	4	1	+3	100.00
Eritrea	1	1	0	0	4	1	+3	100.00
Ethiopia	2	0	1	1	1	2	−1	0.00
Finland	1	0	1	0	0	0	0	0.00
Hong Kong	3	1	1	1	1	2	−1	33.33
India	7	5	2	0	17	8	+9	71.43
Indonesia	6	0	4	2	3	7	−4	0.00
Iran	3	0	0	3	1	11	−10	0.00
Iraq	15	0	3	12	7	36	−29	0.00
Japan	4	0	0	4	3	8	−5	0.00
Jordan	3	0	2	1	2	6	−4	0.00
Kenya	1	1	0	0	3	1	+2	100.00
Kuwait	10	0	5	5	4	18	−14	0.00
Kyrgyzstan	2	1	0	1	2	3	−1	50.00
Lebanon	4	1	1	2	5	7	−2	25.00
Libya	3	0	1	2	2	5	−3	0.00
Malawi	1	1	0	0	1	0	+1	100.00
Malaysia	4	1	0	3	3	5	−2	25.00
Maldives	4	3	0	1	7	2	+5	75.00
Mauritania	1	0	0	1	0	2	−2	0.00
Mongolia	1	0	0	1	0	2	−2	0.00
Nepal	6	4	2	0	11	3	+8	66.67
North Korea	5	0	2	3	3	8	−5	0.00
Oman	13	0	2	11	5	23	−18	0.00
Pakistan	4	3	1	0	11	2	+9	75.00
Palestine	8	3	0	5	8	14	−6	37.50
Philippines	5	1	3	1	4	5	−1	20.00
Qatar	10	0	1	9	3	32	−29	0.00
Saudi Arabia	20	0	2	18	7	59	−52	0.00
Singapore	2	0	1	1	3	4	−1	0.00
Sri Lanka	4	2	1	1	6	2	+4	50.00
Sudan	3	1	1	1	5	5	0	33.33
Syria	7	2	1	4	8	18	−10	28.57
Tajikistan	4	2	1	1	4	3	+1	50.00
Tanzania	3	2	1	0	5	3	+2	66.67
Thailand	5	0	3	2	2	6	−4	0.00
Turkmenistan	3	0	0	3	1	7	−6	0.00
Uganda	1	0	1	0	2	2	0	0.00
United Arab Emirates	13	2	0	11	11	31	−20	15.38
Uzbekistan	6	0	0	6	2	16	−14	0.00
Vietnam	1	0	0	1	0	2	−2	0.00
Zambia	2	0	1	1	2	3	−1	0.00
Zimbabwe	2	1	0	1	1	1	0	50.00
Total	241	54	51	136	247	426	−179	22.41

Source: Results
