= 27th Arabian Gulf Cup =

International football tournament in 2026

كأس الخليج العربي 27

Tournament details
- Host country: Saudi Arabia
- City: Jeddah
- Dates: 23 September – 6 October
- Teams: 8 (from 1 confederation)
- Venues: 2 (in 1 host city)

Final positions
- Champions: Saudi Arabia (4th title)
- Runners-up: United Arab Emirates

Tournament statistics
- Matches played: 15
- Goals scored: 39 (2.6 per match)
- Attendance: 253,370 (16,891 per match)
- Top scorer(s): (Saudi Arabia) Firas Al-Buraikan (3 goals)
- Best player: (Saudi Arabia) Hammam Al-Hammami
- Best goalkeeper: (Saudi Arabia) Mohammed Al-Owais

The 27th Arabian Gulf Cup, known as Khaleeji Arabian Dyar 27 for sponsorship reasons, was the 27th edition of the biennial football competition for the eight members of the Gulf Football Federation. The tournament was held in Saudi Arabia from 23 September to 6 October 2026.

Hosts Saudi Arabia won their fourth title, and their first since 2003–04, after beating the United Arab Emirates 2–0 in the final.

== Teams ==
Team	Appearance	Previous best performance	FIFA Rankings
Team	Appearance	Previous best performance	April 2026
Qatar	27th	Winners (1992, 2004, 2014)	55
Iraq	18th	Winners (1979, 1984, 1988, 2023)	57
Saudi Arabia (hosts)	26th	Winners (1994, 2002, 2003–04)	61
United Arab Emirates	26th	Winners (2007, 2013)	68
Oman	25th	Winners (2009, 2017–18)	79
Bahrain (holders)	27th	Winners (2019, 2024–25)	91
Kuwait	27th	Winners (1970, 1972, 1974, 1976, 1982, 1986, 1990, 1996, 1998, 2010)	134
Yemen	12th	Group stage (2003–04, 2004, 2007, 2009, 2010, 2013, 2014, 2017–18, 2019, 2023, 2024–25)	149

=== Draw ===
The draw was held on 19 May 2026 at 16:00 UTC+3 in Jeddah. The eight teams were drawn into two groups of four, by selecting one team from each of the four ranked pots. Their pot positions were based on the FIFA rankings from 1 April 2026 (shown in parentheses). As hosts, Saudi Arabia were automatically seeded at the top of Group A, with corresponding Pot 2 team the United Arab Emirates thus placed in Group B.

Pot 1	Pot 2	Pot 3	Pot 4
Qatar (55); Iraq (57)	Saudi Arabia (61) (hosts); United Arab Emirates (68)	Oman (79); Bahrain (91)	Kuwait (134); Yemen (149)

=== Squads ===
Each team had to register a squad of 26 players, three of whom had to be goalkeepers.

== Venues ==
Location of areas hosting the 27th Arabian Gulf Cup
1 Jeddah

(Saudi Arabia) Jeddah
King Abdullah Sports City Stadium	Prince Abdullah Al-Faisal Sports City Stadium
Capacity: 62,345	Capacity: 27,000

== Officials ==
Source:

== Group stage ==
Tiebreakers
Teams were ranked according to points (3 points for a win, 1 point for a draw, 0 points for a loss), and if tied on points, the following tiebreaking criteria were applied, in the order given, to determine the rankings:
1. Points in head-to-head matches among tied teams;
2. Goal difference in head-to-head matches among tied teams;
3. Goals scored in head-to-head matches among tied teams;
4. If more than two teams were tied, and after applying all head-to-head criteria above, a subset of teams were still tied, all head-to-head criteria above were reapplied exclusively to this subset of teams;
5. Goal difference in all group matches;
6. Goals scored in all group matches;
7. Disciplinary points (yellow card = 1 point, red card (be it from direct or two yellows) = 3 points, yellow card followed by direct red card = 4 points);
8. Drawing of lots.

=== Group A ===
Pos	Team	Pld	W	D	L	GF	GA	GD	Pts	Qualification
1	Saudi Arabia (H)	3	3	0	0	6	0	+6	9	Advance to knockout stage
2	Oman	3	1	1	1	4	5	−1	4 (Note: Oman and Iraq were tied on head-to-head record, overall goal difference, overall goals scored, and disciplinary points. A drawing of lots took place on 29 September 2026, in which Oman won the lot for second place and advanced to the semi-finals as the group runner-up.)	Advance to knockout stage
3	Iraq	3	1	1	1	4	5	−1	4	
4	Kuwait	3	0	0	3	3	7	−4	0	

Source: GFF
Rules for classification: Group stage tiebreakers
(H) Hosts
Notes:
23 September 2026
17:30 UTC+3

Iraq	1–1	Oman
Qasim 6'	Report	Al-Rawahi 67'

Prince Abdullah Al-Faisal Sports City Stadium, Jeddah
Referee: Omar Al Ali (United Arab Emirates)
23 September 2026
21:00 UTC+3

Saudi Arabia	1–0	Kuwait
Al Haqan 73' (o.g.)	Report

King Abdullah Sports City Stadium, Jeddah
Attendance: 31,245
Referee: João Pinheiro (Portugal)

26 September 2026
18:55 UTC+3

Kuwait	2–3	Iraq
Nasser 75' (pen.), 90'	Report	Iqbal 52'; Rasheed 83'; Nabeel 90+9'

Prince Abdullah Al-Faisal Sports City Stadium, Jeddah
Attendance: 6,196
Referee: Jalal Jayed (Morocco)
26 September 2026
21:00 UTC+3

Oman	0–3	Saudi Arabia
	Report	Al-Buraikan 11', 34'; Kadesh 18'

King Abdullah Sports City Stadium, Jeddah
Attendance: 23,186
Referee: Ammar Mahfoodh (Bahrain)

29 September 2026
20:30 UTC+3

Saudi Arabia	2–0	Iraq
Al-Salem 55'; Al-Hamdan 69'	Report

King Abdullah Sports City Stadium, Jeddah
Attendance: 41,594
Referee: Danny Makkelie (Netherlands)
29 September 2026
20:30 UTC+3

Oman	3–1	Kuwait
Al-Rawahi 65', 81'; Al-Shaqsy 84'	Report	Al-Khaldi 6'

Prince Abdullah Al-Faisal Sports City Stadium, Jeddah
Attendance: 1,184
Referee: Mohammed Ahmed Al-Shammari (Qatar)

=== Group B ===
Pos	Team	Pld	W	D	L	GF	GA	GD	Pts	Qualification
1	United Arab Emirates	3	2	1	0	8	1	+7	7	Advance to knockout stage
2	Qatar	3	2	1	0	4	1	+3	7	Advance to knockout stage
3	Yemen	3	1	0	2	5	7	−2	3	
4	Bahrain	3	0	0	3	2	10	−8	0	

Source: GFF
Rules for classification: Group stage tiebreakers
24 September 2026
18:55 UTC+3

United Arab Emirates	4–0	Yemen
Giménez 26', 51'; Sahal 36' (o.g.); Luanzinho 45+4'	Report

King Abdullah Sports City Stadium, Jeddah
Attendance: 10,138
Referee: Qasim Al-Hatmi (Oman)
24 September 2026
21:00 UTC+3

Qatar	2–0	Bahrain
Khoukhi 61'; Al-Haydos 90+9' (pen.)	Report

Prince Abdullah Al-Faisal Sports City Stadium, Jeddah
Attendance: 1,918
Referee: Khalid Al-Turais (Saudi Arabia)

27 September 2026
18:55 UTC+3

Yemen	0–1	Qatar
	Report	Abdurisag 64'

King Abdullah Sports City Stadium, Jeddah
Attendance: 8,398
Referee: Adham Makhadmeh (Jordan)
27 September 2026
21:00 UTC+3

Bahrain	0–3	United Arab Emirates
	Report	Ousmane 30'; Bala 66'; Saleh 88'

Prince Abdullah Al-Faisal Sports City Stadium, Jeddah
Attendance: 1,747
Referee: Abdullah Jamali (Kuwait)

30 September 2026
20:30 UTC+3

United Arab Emirates	1–1	Qatar
Saleh 45+4'	Report	A. Ali 33'

King Abdullah Sports City Stadium, Jeddah
Referee: Jalal Jayed (Morocco)
30 September 2026
20:30 UTC+3

Bahrain	2–5	Yemen
Al-Doseri 7'; Madan 67'	Report	Al-Gahwashi 18'; Al-Matari 31'; Al-Wasmani 40', 90+5'; Qasem 44'

Prince Abdullah Al-Faisal Sports City Stadium, Jeddah
Attendance: 6,403
Referee: Zaid Thamer Mohammed (Iraq)

== Knockout stage ==
In the knockout stage, extra time and a penalty shoot-out were used to decide the winner if necessary.

=== Bracket ===
Semi-finals
3 October – Jeddah
Saudi Arabia (p)	0 (3)
Qatar	0 (2)
3 October – Jeddah
United Arab Emirates	1
Oman	0

Final
6 October – Jeddah
Saudi Arabia	2
United Arab Emirates	0

=== Semi-finals ===
3 October 2026
18:55 UTC+3

Saudi Arabia	0–0 (a.e.t.)	Qatar
	Report
Penalties
Al-Hamdan (penalty scored); Kanno (penalty scored); Al-Tambakti (penalty missed); Al-Buraikan (penalty missed); Ali (penalty scored)	3–2	(penalty missed) A. Ali; (penalty scored) Edmilson; (penalty missed) Gaber; (penalty missed) Khoukhi; (penalty scored) Al-Ganehi

King Abdullah Sports City Stadium, Jeddah
Attendance: 51,342
Referee: João Pinheiro (Portugal)

3 October 2026
21:30 UTC+3

United Arab Emirates	1–0	Oman
Camara 22'	Report

Prince Abdullah Al-Faisal Sports City Stadium, Jeddah
Attendance: 2,088
Referee: Danny Makkelie (Netherlands)

=== Final ===
6 October 2026
21:00 UTC+3

Saudi Arabia	2–0	United Arab Emirates
Al-Hammami 11'; Al-Buraikan 13'	Report

King Abdullah Sports City Stadium, Jeddah
Attendance: 62,827
Referee: Jalal Jayed (Morocco)

== Winner ==
27th Arabian Gulf Cup Winner

Saudi Arabia
Fourth title

== Statistics ==
=== Goalscorers ===
There were 39 goals scored in 15 matches, for an average of 2.6 goals per match.

3 goals

- (Saudi Arabia) Firas Al-Buraikan
- (Oman) Nasser Al-Rawahi

2 goals

- (Kuwait) Yousef Nasser
- (United Arab Emirates) Ousmane Camara
- (United Arab Emirates) Nicolás Giménez
- (United Arab Emirates) Ali Saleh
- (Yemen) Rami Al-Wasmani

1 goal

- (Bahrain) Ali Al-Doseri
- (Bahrain) Ali Madan
- (Iraq) Zidane Iqbal
- (Iraq) Karrar Nabeel
- (Iraq) Mohammed Qasim
- (Iraq) Saif Rasheed
- (Qatar) Yusuf Abdurisag
- (Qatar) Hassan Al-Haydos
- (Qatar) Almoez Ali
- (Qatar) Boualem Khoukhi
- (Saudi Arabia) Abdullah Al-Hamdan
- (Saudi Arabia) Hammam Al-Hammami
- (Saudi Arabia) Abdullah Al-Salem
- (Saudi Arabia) Hassan Kadesh
- (United Arab Emirates) Guilherme Bala
- (United Arab Emirates) Luanzinho
- (Yemen) Nasser Al-Gahwashi
- (Yemen) Abdulwasea Al-Matari
- (Yemen) Adel Abbas Qasem
- (Oman) Musab Al-Shaqsy
- (Kuwait) Shabaib Al-Khaldi

1 own goal

- (Kuwait) Yousef Al-Haqan (against Saudi Arabia)
- (Yemen) Nader Sahal (against United Arab Emirates)

=== Discipline ===
A player or team official was automatically suspended for the next match of the tournament for the following offenses:

- Receiving a red card (red card suspensions could be extended for serious offenses).
- Receiving two yellow cards in the tournament; (Note: As yellow cards were not carried forward to penalty shoot-outs, players could be shown two yellow cards in the same match without being sent off. However, this would result in a suspension for accumulating two yellow cards during the tournament.)

The following suspensions occurred during the tournament:

Tournament suspensions for players and team officials
Player	Offense(s)	Suspension(s)
(Iraq national football team) Rebin Sulaka (Note: Announced retirement after the World Cup ended.)	(red card) in 2026 FIFA World Cup vs Senegal (26 June 2026)	Group A vs Oman (matchday 1; 23 September)
(Qatar national football team) Ahmed Fathy	(yellow card) (yellow-red card) in Group B vs Bahrain (24 September)	Group B vs Yemen (matchday 2; 27 September)
(Bahrain national football team) Abbas Al Asfoor	(red card) in Group B vs Qatar (24 September)	Group B vs United Arab Emirates (matchday 2; 27 September)
(Kuwait national football team) Abdulwahab Al-Awadi	(yellow card) (yellow-red card) in Group A vs Iraq (26 September)	Group A vs Oman (matchday 3; 29 September)
(United Arab Emirates national football team) Khaled Ibrahim	(red card) in final vs Saudi Arabia (6 October)	Suspension served outside tournament

=== Awards ===
The following awards were given following the conclusion of the tournament:

Award	Player
Top Scorer	(Saudi Arabia) Firas Al-Buraikan
Most Valuable Player	(Saudi Arabia) Hammam Al-Hammami
Best Goalkeeper	(Saudi Arabia) Mohammed Al-Owais

== Broadcasters ==
Territory	Broadcaster	Ref.
Saudi Arabia (host)	SBA	
Saudi Arabia (host)	MBC	
Australia	SBS	
Austria	Sportdigital	
Germany	Sportdigital	
Switzerland	Sportdigital	
Bahrain	BRTC	
Iraq	IMN	
Iraq	Al-Rabia'a	
Kuwait	KTV	
Kuwait	Shasha	
Oman	PART	
Qatar	Al-Kass	
United Arab Emirates	ADMN	
United Arab Emirates	DMI	
United Arab Emirates	SBA	
United States	ESPN	
