= Luciano de Abreu =

Brazilian professional football manager

Personal information
- Full name: Ahmed Luciano de Abreu
- Place of birth: Brazil

Managerial career
- Years: Team
- 1993–1994: Yemen
- 2000–2002: Yemen

Luciano de Abreu is a Brazilian professional football manager. Since 1993 until 1994 he coached the Yemen national football team. Since 2000 until 2002 he again worked as a head coach of Yemen team.
