= Rami Al-Wasmani =

Yemeni footballer (born 1997)

Personal information
- Full name: Rami Ali Yahya Al-Wasmani
- Date of birth: 1 February 1997 (age 29)
- Place of birth: Yemen
- Position: Defender

Team information
- Current team: SDZ

Youth career
- Al-Ahli (Sanaa)

Senior career*
Years	Team	Apps	(Gls)
–2019	Al Ahli (Sanaa)		
2020–2021	Táborsko	12	(0)
2021–	SDZ		

International career
2018–	Yemen	16	(2)
- * Club domestic league appearances and goals

Rami Ali Yahya Al-Wasmani (Arabic: رامي الوسماني; born 1 February 1997) is a Yemeni footballer who plays as a defender for SDZ.

== Career ==
Al-Wasmani started his career with Yemeni top flight side Al-Ahli (Sanaa). In 2021, he signed for SDZ in the Dutch sixth tier after trialing for Táborsko in the Czech third tier.

== International goals ==
List of international goals scored by Rami Al-Wasmani
No.	Date	Venue	Opponent	Score	Result	Competition
1.	30 September 2026	Prince Abdullah Al-Faisal Sports City Stadium, Jeddah, Saudi Arabia	Bahrain	4–1	5–2	27th Arabian Gulf Cup
2.	30 September 2026	Prince Abdullah Al-Faisal Sports City Stadium, Jeddah, Saudi Arabia	Bahrain	5–2	5–2	27th Arabian Gulf Cup
