= Yasser Basuhai =

Yemeni footballer

Personal information
- Full name: Yasser Basuhai
- Date of birth: 27 March 1979 (age 47)
- Place of birth: Al Hudaydah, Yemen
- Height: 1.80 m (5 ft 11 in)
- Position: Forward

Youth career
- 1995–1998: Al-Hilal Al-Sahili

Senior career*
Years	Team	Apps	(Gls)
1998–2016	Al-Hilal Al-Sahili		

International career^{‡}
2003	Yemen U23	؟؟	(؟؟)
2003–2015	Yemen	47	(8)
- * Club domestic league appearances and goals as of 00:00, 10 October 2011 (UTC) ‡ National team caps and goals as of 00:00, 20 September 2008(UTC)

Yasser Basuhai (Arabic: ياسر باصهي) (born 27 March 1979) is a Yemeni football forward.

Basuhai scored four goals for Yemen in the 2004 AFC Asian Cup qualifying round.

== Honours ==
=== Club ===
Al-Hilal

- Yemeni League: 2

2007–08, 2008–09

- Yemeni President Cup: 2

2005, 2008

- Yemeni September 26 Cup: 1

2003
