= Ousmane Camara (footballer, born January 2001) =

Emirati footballer (born 2001)

Personal information
- Full name: Ousmane Camara
- Date of birth: 23 January 2001 (age 25)
- Place of birth: Conakry, Guinea
- Height: 1.82 m (6 ft 0 in)
- Position: Forward

Team information
- Current team: Sharjah
- Number: 30

Youth career
- –2019: Jeunesse Sportive de Guinée

Senior career*
Years	Team	Apps	(Gls)
2019–2021	CS Sfaxien	14	(3)
2021–	Sharjah	112	(28)
2021	→ Al-Ittihad Kalba (loan)	6	(4)

International career^{‡}
2018	Guinea U17	1	(0)
2026–	United Arab Emirates	6	(3)
- * Club domestic league appearances and goals as of 21 September 2026 ‡ National team caps and goals as of 17 November 2026

Ousmane Camara (Arabic: عثمان كامارا; born 23 January 2001) is a professional footballer who plays as a forward for UAE Pro League club Sharjah. Born in Guinea, he plays for the United Arab Emirates national team.

== Club career ==
Born in Conakry, Camara was formed at the local Jeunesse Sportive de Guinée. He joined Tunisian Ligue 1 club CS Sfaxien in 2019 before moving to UAE Pro League side Sharjah in 2021. Shortly after signing for Sharjah, Camara was loaned to Al-Ittihad Kalba for three months.

On 27 December 2025, Camara netted a late winner goal for Sharjah in a 3–2 victory over Shabab Al-Ahli in the 2025 UAE Super Cup.

== International career ==
Camara played for Guinea U17 in 2018.

Camara received Emirati citizenship in 2024. In September 2026, he received his first call-up to the United Arab Emirates, being named in the final squad for the 27th Arabian Gulf Cup. He scored his first international goal in the second group stage game against Bahrain and was named man of the match after a 3–0 win.

== Career statistics ==
=== International ===
As of match played 17 November 2026

Appearances and goals by national team and year
National team	Year	Apps	Goals
United Arab Emirates	2026	6	3
Total		6	3

United Arab Emirates score listed first, score column indicates score after each Ousmane Camara goal

List of international goals scored by Ousmane Camara
No.	Date	Venue	Opponent	Score	Result	Competition
1.	27 September 2026	Prince Abdullah Al-Faisal Sports City Stadium, Jeddah, Saudi Arabia	Bahrain	1–0	3–0	27th Arabian Gulf Cup
2.	3 October 2026	Prince Abdullah Al-Faisal Sports City Stadium, Jeddah, Saudi Arabia	Oman	1–0	1–0	27th Arabian Gulf Cup
3.	17 November 2026	Hazza bin Zayed Stadium, Al Ain, United Arab Emirates	Syria	4–1	4–2	Friendly

== Honours ==
Sharjah

- UAE President's Cup: 2021–22, 2022–23
- UAE League Cup: 2022–23
- UAE Super Cup: 2022, 2025
- AFC Champions League Two: 2024–25
