= Ahmed Ali Qasem =

Yemeni footballer and manager

Personal information
- Full name: Ahmed Ali Qasem Al-Dhrab
- Date of birth: 1 October 1961 (age 65)
- Place of birth: Ibb, Yemen
- Position: Goalkeeper

Senior career*
Years	Team	Apps	(Gls)
- Shaab Ibb

Managerial career
- 2003: Yemen
- 2013–2015: Shaab Ibb
- 2014–2015: Yemen U19
- 2016: Yemen
- Al-Ittihad SCC
- Najm Saba
- Al Rasheed Ta'izz
- Al-Shaab Hadramaut
- Al-Oruba
- 2021: Yemen
- * Club domestic league appearances and goals

Ahmed Ali Qasem Al-Dhrab (Arabic: أحمد علي قاسم; born 1 October 1961) is a Yemeni former footballer and manager.

== Playing career ==
During his playing career, Qasem played for hometown club Shaab Ibb.

== Managerial career ==
In 2003, Qasem managed Yemen for a total of nine games. From 2014 to 2015, Qasem managed the Yemen under-19 team. Between January and April 2016, Qasem managed Yemen.

Domestically, Qasem managed Shaab Ibb, Al-Ittihad SCC, Najm Saba, Al Rasheed Ta'izz, Al-Shaab Hadramaut and Al-Oruba.

In May 2021, Qasem was re-appointed as manager of Yemen for a third time.
