= Sami Hasan Al Nash =

Yemeni football manager (1957–2021)

Personal information
- Full name: Sami Hasan Saleh Al Hadi Al Nash
- Date of birth: 16 January 1957
- Place of birth: Yemen
- Date of death: 10 May 2021 (aged 64)
- Place of death: Aden, Yemen

Managerial career
- Years: Team
- 2009: Yemen
- 2012: Yemen
- 2013–2014: Al-Ahli Ta'izz
- 2013: Yemen
- 2019–2021: Yemen

Sami Hasan Saleh Al Hadi Al Nash (Arabic: سامي حسن صالح الهادي النعاش; 2 May 1957 – 10 May 2021) was a Yemeni professional football manager.

== Career ==
From January to May 2009 he coached the Yemen national team. Later, since January until October 2012 he again served as manager of the Yemen team. In March 2013 he became a head coach of the Al-Ahli Ta'izz. Also from April to December 2013 he led the Yemen team.

In 2019, he was once again appointed coach of Yemen in preparation for the 2019 WAFF Championship replacing Ján Kocian.

== Death ==
On 16 May 2021, the Yemen Football Association announced Al Nash had died from COVID-19 on 10 May 2021, in the Yemeni port city of Aden after contracting the virus in April during a training camp in Shabwah.

== Managerial statistics ==
As of match played 2 December 2019

Managerial record by team and tenure
| Team | From | To | Record | | | | | Ref. |
| Team | From | To | P | W | D | L | Win % | Ref. |
|---|---|---|---|---|---|---|---|---|
| Yemen | 1 January 2009 | 1 October 2009 | 5 | 1 | 0 | 4 | 20.0 | |
| Yemen | 1 January 2009 | 1 October 2009 | 4 | 1 | 0 | 3 | 25.0 | |
| Al-Ahli Taizz SC | 1 March 2013 | 30 June 2014 | 51 | 15 | 12 | 24 | 29.4 | |
| Yemen | 1 April 2013 | 31 December 2013 | 4 | 0 | 0 | 4 | 0.0 | |
| Yemen | 1 July 2019 | 10 May 2021 | 13 | 2 | 4 | 7 | 15.4 | |
| Total | | | 77 | 19 | 16 | 42 | 24.7 | — |
