= Omar Al-Dahi =

Yemeni footballer

Personal information
- Full name: Omar Abdullah Al-Dahi
- Date of birth: 15 December 1999 (age 26)
- Place of birth: Yemen
- Position: Midfielder

Team information
- Current team: Al-Karma SC

Senior career*
Years	Team	Apps	(Gls)
2018–2019	Al-Sha'ab Sana'a		
2019–2020	Al-Qasim		
2020–2022	Aswan	11	(0)
2023	Al-Zawraa SC		
2023-24	Al-Najma SC (Bahrain)		
2024-	Al-Karma SC	4	(0)

International career^{‡}
2019–	Yemen	34	(6)
- * Club domestic league appearances and goals as of 16 December 2024 @ 17:04(AEST) ‡ National team caps and goals as of 14 October 2025

Omar Abdullah Al-Dahi (Arabic: عمر عبد الله الداحي; born 15 December 1999), is a Yemeni professional footballer who plays as a midfielder for Iraq Stars League club Al-Karma and the Yemeni national team.

== Personal life ==
He is the younger brother to Mohammed Al-Dahi, who is also a member of the Yemeni national team.

== Club career ==
Al-Dahi started his career playing for Al-Sha'ab Sana'a, he later joined Iraqi club Al-Qasim. In November 2020, he transferred to Egyptian club Aswan.

== International career ==
He debuted internationally on 8 August 2019, in the 2019 WAFF Championship held in Iraq with a match against Lebanon in a 2–1 victory.

On 5 September 2019, Al-Dahi appeared in the 2022 FIFA World Cup qualification to be held in Qatar and scored his first goal for Yemen against Saudi Arabia in a 2–2 draw.

== International goals ==
Scores and results list Yemen's goal tally first.

No.	Date	Venue	Opponent	Score	Result	Competition
1.	10 September 2019	Bahrain National Stadium, Riffa, Bahrain	Saudi Arabia	2–1	2–2	2022 FIFA World Cup qualification
2.	14 November 2019	Al Muharraq Stadium, Muharraq, Bahrain	Palestine	1–0	1–0	2022 FIFA World Cup qualification
3.	9 January 2023	Basra International Stadium, Basra, Iraq	Oman	2–1	2–3	2023 Arabian Gulf Cup
4.	21 November 2023	Dasharath Rangasala, Kathmandu, Nepal	Nepal	1–0	2–0	2026 FIFA World Cup qualification
5.	14 October 2025	Jaber Al-Ahmad International Stadium, Kuwait City, Kuwait	Brunei	3–0	9–0	2027 AFC Asian Cup qualification
6.	14 October 2025	Jaber Al-Ahmad International Stadium, Kuwait City, Kuwait	Brunei	7–0	9–0	2027 AFC Asian Cup qualification
