= Sharjah TV =

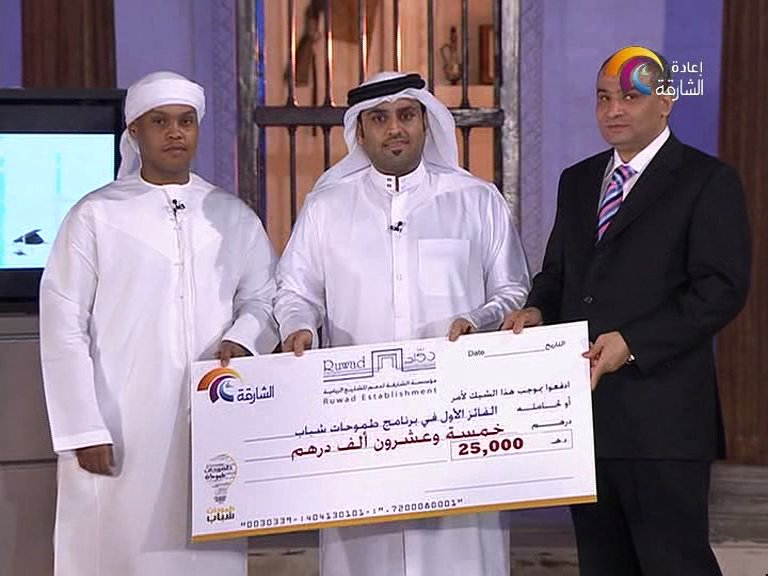
- Broadcast area: Worldwide

Programming
- Picture format: 16:9; SD (576i); HD (1080i)

Ownership
- Owner: Sharjah Media Corporation

History
- Launched: 11 February 1989; 37 years ago

Links
- Website: sba.net.ae

Sharjah TV (Arabic: قناة الشارقة, literally Sharjah Channel) is an Emirati state-owned television channel of the emirate of Sharjah, operating under the Sharjah Broadcasting Authority. The station started its terrestrial broadcasts in 1989 and on satellite in 1996. The programming concentrates mainly on religious and cultural programming.

== History ==
Sharjah Television Station was established on 18 November 1985 and did not commence its transmission until 11 February 1989, when it was opened by Sheikh Sultan bin Muhammad Al-Qasimi, one year after the completion of the station's building.

In 1990, the station won its first award at the Cairo Radio and TV Festival.

The channel started satellite broadcasts in 1996, being converted to an "Arab Cultural Channel" in 1997. In July 2007, SMC launched Sharjah TV 2, positioned as a sports, youth, cultural and social channel, followed by the Sharjah Sports Channel. The current Sharjah Media Corporation was created in 2009 per an Emiri decree issued by Dr. Shaikh Sultan, and also incorporated the radio station and training facilities.

For the 25th anniversary of the channel, Sharjah TV unveiled a new logo, changing its colour from gold to silver.

In February 2019, Sharjah TV introduced a new logo to coincide with its 30th anniversary.

== Ownership ==
Sharjah TV is state-owned, operating under the Sharjah Broadcasting Authority.

== Programming ==
Sharjah TV broadcasts a variety of religious and cultural programmes in several languages, in order to reach out to all ethnic groups of the country. In languages other than Arabic, Sharjah TV produces programmes in Persian and Urdu languages.

One of its most popular programmes is Direct Line, created in 2006, which is simulcast with Sharjah Radio.

In October 2023, SMC signed an agreement with Radiotelevisión Española for the exclusive rights to the Arab World of Abu Abdillah, the Prince of Granada, a historic miniseries.
