= Yemen national football team =

National association football team representing Yemen

Yemen
- Nickname(s): Al-Yaman as-Sa'eed (اليمن السعيد, The Happy Yemen); Asl Al-Arab (اصل العرب, The origin of the Arabs)
- Association: Yemen Football Association (YFA)
- Confederation: AFC (Asia)
- Sub-confederation: WAFF (West Asia)
- Head coach: Noureddine Ould Ali
- Captain: Abdulwasea Al-Matari
- Most caps: Alaa Al-Sasi (84)
- Top scorer: Ali Al-Nono (30)
- Home stadium: Althawra Sports City Stadium
- FIFA code: YEM
First colours	Second colours

FIFA ranking
- Current: 148 ▼4 (18 November 2026)
- Highest: 90 (August – September 1993, November 1993)
- Lowest: 186 (February 2014)

First international
- Syria 4–1 North Yemen (Baghdad, Iraq; 2 April 1966) as Yemen; Malaysia 0–1 Yemen (Kuala Lumpur, Malaysia; 8 September 1990)

Biggest win
- North Yemen 2–1 United Arab Emirates (Casablanca, Morocco; 11 August 1985); North Yemen 1–0 India (Abu Dhabi, United Arab Emirates; 11 February 1988) as Yemen; Yemen 11–2 Bhutan (Kuwait City, Kuwait; 18 February 2000); Yemen 9–0 Brunei (Kuwait City, Kuwait; 14 October 2025)

Biggest defeat
- North Korea 14–0 North Yemen (Phnom Penh, Cambodia; 30 November 1966) as Yemen; Saudi Arabia 7–0 Yemen (Jeddah, Saudi Arabia; 6 October 2003)

Asian Cup
- Appearances: 2 (first in 2019)
- Best result: Group stage (2019)

Arab Cup
- Appearances: 3 (first in 1966)
- Best result: Group stage (1966, 2002, 2012)

WAFF Championship
- Appearances: 4 (first in 2010)
- Best result: Semi-finals (2010)

The Yemen national football team (Arabic: منتخب الْيَمَن لِكُرَّةُ الْقَدَم) represents Yemen in men's international football and is administered by the Yemen Football Association.

When Yemen was split into North and South, two national teams existed. The current Yemeni national team inherits the records of North Yemen.

Despite being the fifth-most populated country in the Middle East, Yemen has never achieved the same success as those with much smaller populations, only qualifying for the AFC Asian Cup twice after unification in 1990.

== History ==
=== 1965–1966 ===
Two teams representing the State of Aden and the Sultanate of Lahej debuted at the 1965 Arab Games in Cairo, Egypt. Aden played against Palestine (0–1), (Note: Played over two halves of 40 minutes each.) the United Arab Republic (0–14), Iraq (0–6), and Lebanon (3–4), while Lahej played against Sudan (0–9), Syria (0–4), Libya (0–16), and Muscat and Oman (2–1). Both teams were eliminated in their respective group stages, finishing respectively fifth and fourth in their groups. Aden was the precursor to the South Yemen national team after the establishment of the People's Republic of Yemen in 1967.

In April 1966, North Yemen debuted at the 1966 Arab Cup in Baghdad, Iraq, placed in Group 2. They lost their first match 4–1 to Syria and were then crushed 7–0 by Palestine three days later. On 5 April, they suffered an even heavier loss, 13–0 to Libya, thus finishing bottom of the group. Also in 1966, North Yemen entered the Games of the New Emerging Forces in Cambodia and lost their opener 5–3 to Palestine.

=== 1984–1989 ===
Following the tournament in Cambodia, North Yemen did not play a match for eighteen years, returning in 1984 in an attempt to qualify to the 1984 Asian Cup. This was their first entrance of the competition. They were placed at the qualifiers in Group 3 with all matches held in Calcutta, India in October 1984. North Yemen lost the first match on 10 October, 6–0 to South Korea, for whom Park Sung-Hwa scored four goals and Chung Hae-Won two. Two days later, they lost 2–0 to hosts India. On 15 October North Yemen lost 4–1 to Pakistan and three days later by the same score to Malaysia. North Yemen finished at the bottom of the group.

North Yemen entered its first World Cup qualification campaign with the aim of securing a place in the 1986 World Cup in Mexico. They were placed in Group 3 of the West Asia zone in the first round of the qualification campaign. North Yemen played their first match at home to Syria in Sanaa on 29 March 1985 and lost 1–0 to a 70th-minute goal. On 5 April, they lost 5–0 to Kuwait in Kuwait City. On 19 April, North Yemen lost 3–0 away to Syria at the Abbasiyyin Stadium in Damascus. On 26 April, while hosting Kuwait, North Yemen scored their only goal in the group as they lost 3–1 in front of 10,000 people.

In August 1985, North Yemen competed at the 1985 Arab Games in Rabat, Morocco and was placed in a group with Saudi Arabia, Algeria and the United Arab Emirates. They lost 2–0 to the Saudis on 5 August, 3–1 to Algeria on 7 August, and on 9 August beat the UAE 2–1 for their first ever victory.

On 15 October 1985, North Yemen played opposition from outside Asia and Africa for the first time, losing a friendly 2–0 to Mexico at home.

=== Reunification of the North and South (1990s) ===
In the 1990, the North and South of Yemen re-united which prompted what is now the national team of Yemen to be merged from North Yemen.

Upon being a new country, their captains alternated between matches to promote a "unified" Yemen.

Starting in 1993, their first big task would be the qualification to the 1994 FIFA World Cup, because they did not enter the AFC Asian Cup in 1992, nor the Arab Cup. Yemen lost three games, against China once, and Iraq twice. They drew with Jordan twice, and won against China and Pakistan. This placed them third, five points from Iraq who were first, and ultimately ended their first ever World Cup qualification campaign.

The qualification campaign for the 1996 Asian Cup saw them get thrashed by Saudi Arabia as they lost 4–0 in the first leg, but put a fight in the second leg as they lost 1–0. Despite finishing last, on points with Kyrgyzstan, Yemen's only redeeming event was a narrow 1–0 win against Kyrgyzstan, despite getting beat 3–1 in the return leg.

More years went by as Yemen continued to struggle, not only in Asia, but in the Middle East. The qualification campaign for the 1998 World Cup raised some spirits as they came in second above Indonesia and Cambodia. For the Yemenis, this was an ample progress as Uzbekistan, with 16 points, had stomped the first stage with having twice as many points as second-place Yemen at 8 points. While adding on to the fact that Yemen lost 1–0 to Uzbekistan, and despite losing 5–1 in the return leg, this gave the Yemenis a hopeful future for the upcoming tournaments.

=== 2000s ===
Yemen started the millennium by attempting to qualify for the 2000 AFC Asian Cup. The Al-Yemen A'Sa'eed started off the year with a 3–0 win against Nepal following with a 0–1 loss to Turkmenistan. After this, it came to light that Kuwait had thrashed Bhutan 20–0 in the qualifiers which prompted doubt in the national team. Yemen lost 2–0 to Kuwait (with an own-goal added) and ended the qualification campaign with their highest win as they stomped Bhutan 11–2. These matches put Yemen at 6 points finishing above Nepal and Bhutan at third place of fifth.

2002 FIFA World Cup (AFC) qualifying (Group 8)
Team	Pld	W	D	L	GF	GA	GD	Pts
(United Arab Emirates) UAE	6	4	0	2	21	5	+16	12
Yemen	6	3	2	1	14	8	+6	11
India	6	3	2	1	11	5	+6	11
Brunei	6	0	0	6	0	28	−28	0

The following year, in 2001, would be a high-point for the Yemeni fans as they watched their national team barely lose out on the advancement of the second round of the qualification campaign of the 2002 FIFA World Cup. They lost to United Arab Emirates who finished at top with 12 points while Yemen, along with India, sat at 11 points with Yemen scoring three more goals than India, despite the same goal-difference of six. They lost in both legs to United Arab Emirates.

However, for the Yemenis, disappointment would strike as they bombed their next big competition, the 2002 Arab Cup. This would be their first appearance since 1966 when they played as North Yemen, in which they also failed losing all three games and having a goal difference of −23. In 2012, they drew 2–2 with Saudi Arabia but lost to Lebanon 4–2, Bahrain 3–1 and Syria 0–4.

The qualification for the 2004 AFC Asian Cup would arrive as the next test for Yemen. The Yemenis were left stranded on the cusp of qualification as they were beat to the last spot by Indonesia by 3 points.

Days later, they would face yet another big tournament in quick succession which was the 16th Arabian Gulf Cup hosted by Kuwait. They came in dead last out of seven. They finished with 1 point, drawing with Oman and a goal difference of −16. But within a few months, the 17th Arabian Gulf Cup arrived, after their poor showing in the previous tournament. However, the Yemenis once again, to everyone's expectations, failed to register a win with the only point coming from a 1–1 draw to Bahrain while losing 0–3 to Saudi Arabia and 3–1 to Kuwait.

Yemen would next look towards the qualification campaign of the 2006 FIFA World Cup. But the Yemenis would soon end it on a short note, as they finished bottom of the group with 5 points under Thailand, United Arab Emirates and North Korea (who won the group with 11 points) and one win, two draws and three losses.

A short time later would find the Yemenis preparing for the 18th Arabian Gulf Cup. Despite, as expected, finishing the group last, they finished with two losses against United Arab Emirates and Oman and the lone draw to Kuwait.

Months later would see Yemen enter the qualification campaign of the 2007 AFC Asian Cup and were knocked out, once again. While Japan and Saudi Arabia qualified comfortably, Yemen achieved their only two wins against India.

=== 2010s ===
The next task for the Yemenis was the qualification campaign for the 2010 FIFA World Cup which was cut shorter than usual. In the first round, Yemen scored three goals without reply against Maldives, in the first leg. In the return leg, Maldives replied with two goals but in the end, it was not enough, and Yemen passed to the next stage. The second stage saw Yemen draw 1–1 with Thailand with the second leg finishing 1–0 in favor to Thailand thus knocking them out 3–2 on aggregate. This was the first time Yemen did not reach the group stages of a World Cup qualification stage.

Yemen started off the new year by hosting the 20th Arabian Gulf Cup for the first time. As hosts, they played in the May 22 Stadium in Aden against Saudi Arabia and lost 0–4. Yemen would go on and lose 2–1 and 0–3 to Qatar and Kuwait respectively thus crashing out of the group stages only scoring one goal while conceding nine.

The qualification campaign for the 2011 AFC Asian Cup was acceptable for Yemeni' standards. Grouped with Japan and Bahrain, and Hong Kong, they achieved two wins, one draw and three losses. They opened with a defeat of 2–1 to Japan and finished with holding Japan to the last minute for a 3–2 defeat.

Ten years later of their last participation, they entered the 2012 Arab Cup where they were grouped with Morocco, Bahrain and Libya. To the bewilderment of many football experts, Bahrain finished last with Yemen finishing third with three points.

However, in 2013, Yemen would participate in the 21st Arabian Gulf Cup, and they would record their worst run in the tournament where they were grouped with Kuwait, Saudi Arabia, and Iraq. They didn't record any goal and conceded six goals losing all three games.

As recent record showed, the Yemenis finished with their worst World Cup qualification campaign for the 2014 World Cup. They faced Iraq which they lost 2–0. The return leg was played in the United Arab Emirates due to the civil unrest in Yemen. This match saw Yemen and Iraq play out to a draw which ended Iraq going through 2–0 on aggregate and thus knocking Yemen out in the knock-out stages.

In December 2013, they sunk to their lowest rank ever on the FIFA rankings at 179th. From the start of January 2013 to December 2013, they lost half of what they had previously, going down nearly 50 points. This calling came for the Yemen Football Association to make a serious signing, when they signed Vladimir Petrović as the coach who had experience in Europe as a player and of Red Star Belgrade fame. Vladmir Petrović quit as Yemen's manager in May 2014.

Because of this, Yemen dropped to their lowest and worst in Yemen's football: 186th. In preparation for the 22nd Arabian Gulf Cup, they hired Czech youth teams' manager Miroslav Soukup to attempt to revive the national team. Once again, Yemen was eliminated without winning a match, but for the first time in their Gulf Cup history, they didn't finish last.

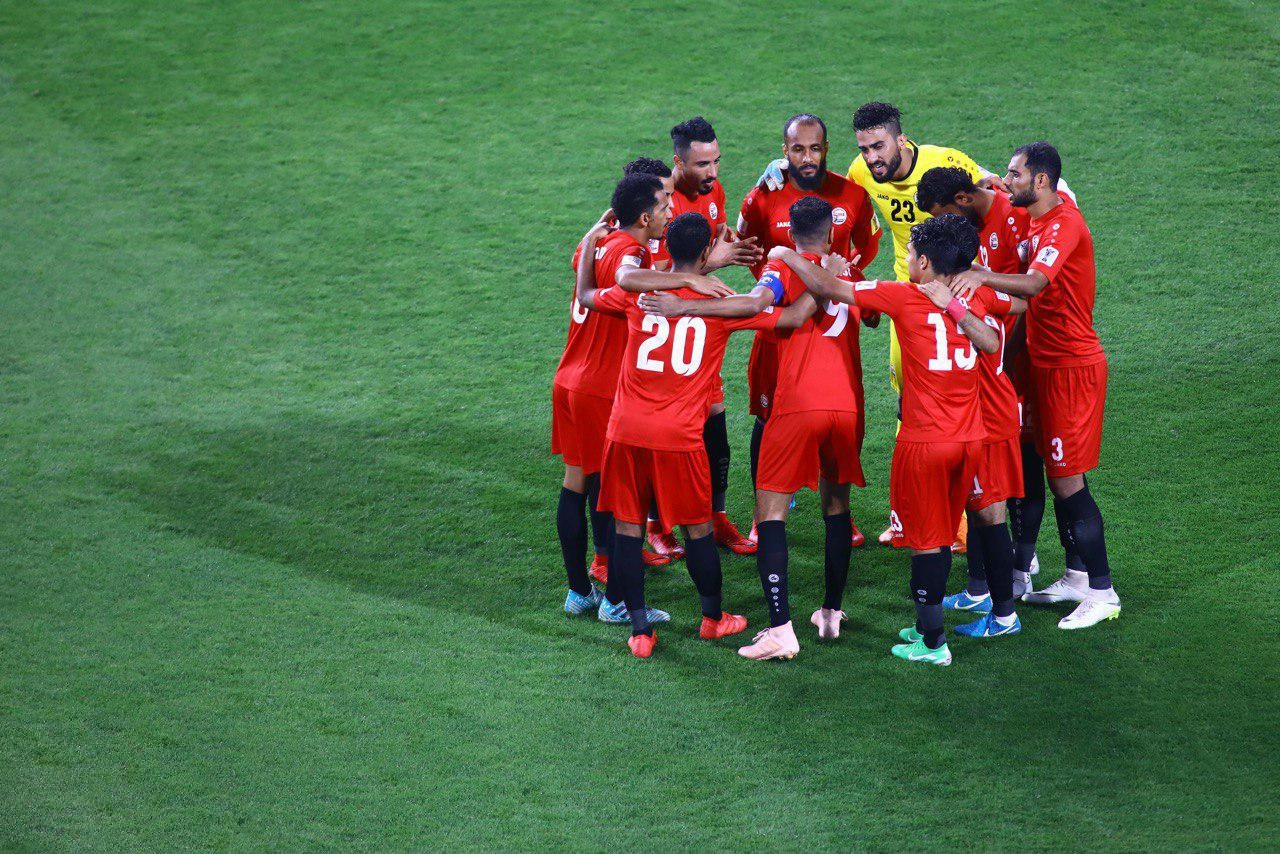
Yemeni players before a 2019 AFC Asian Cup match against Iran

==== Debut at the 2019 AFC Asian Cup ====
The 2018 FIFA World Cup qualification happened with the outbreak of the civil war, leaving majority of the national team's players and staff to escape to Djibouti by boat, which made headline by the media. Yemen only managed to defeat two opponents, Pakistan and the Philippines, while they lost to other opponents, thus Yemen ended their qualification with bottom record. During the 2019 AFC Asian Cup qualification, which was the first attempt of Yemen to qualify to the tournament as an unified nation, Yemen has defeated Tajikistan 2–1 on 23 March 2017, while maintaining four consecutive draws against Nepal and Philippines. Yemen had a big chance to qualify to its first international tournament in its history as a unified country. Finally, with the help from the Philippines when they defeated Tajikistan 2–1 in Manila, Yemen had finally qualified to the 2019 AFC Asian Cup for the first time in its history beating Nepal 2–1 in the last fixtures.

Group F

Pos	Team	Pld	W	D	L	GF	GA	GD	Pts	Qualification	Philippines	Yemen	Tajikistan	Nepal
1	Philippines	6	3	3	0	13	8	+5	12	2019 AFC Asian Cup	—	2–2	2–1	4–1
2	Yemen	6	2	4	0	7	5	+2	10	2019 AFC Asian Cup	1–1	—	2–1	2–1
3	Tajikistan	6	2	1	3	10	9	+1	7		3–4	0–0	—	3–0
4	Nepal	6	0	2	4	3	11	−8	2		0–0	0–0	1–2	—

Source: AFC

In the team's maiden AFC Asian Cup, Yemen was grouped in Group D with Iraq, Iran and Vietnam. Their opening campaign was against Iran, which participated in the previous 2018 FIFA World Cup and had almost eliminated Spain in the progress. Yemen played well in the first ten minutes and almost scored a goal, but aftermath saw Iran completely dominate Yemen and the latter suffered a heavy 0–5 defeat to Iran. Yemen later fell to Iraq 0–3 after being unable to repel Iraqi pressure, and later lost to Southeast Asian opponent Vietnam 0–2 which saw Yemen finished last with no goal and no point. All three opponents of Yemen would soon progress from the group stage.

Yemen later participated in the 2019 WAFF Championship where they were grouped with host Iraq, Palestine, Syria and Lebanon. The Yemeni side was eliminated from the group stage this time, but they managed to finish in third place, even above Lebanon and Syria, thanked for a 2–1 over the former and a 1–1 draw to the latter. Despite this, Yemen once again failed in the 24th Arabian Gulf Cup, scoring no goal and conceded nine, but the Yemenis successfully gained a goalless draw to Iraq to win its first major point since 2014 edition.

=== 2020s ===
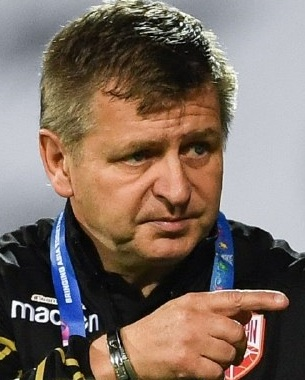
Miroslav Soukup returned as the manager of Yemen in 2022

Between these competitions, Yemen participated in the 2022 FIFA World Cup qualification – AFC second round where they were grouped with Uzbekistan, minnows Singapore and fellow Arab rivals Saudi Arabia and Palestine. During their first games, Yemen got two points after two 2–2 draws over minnows Singapore away and more importantly, the encouraging draw to powerhouse Saudi Arabia in Bahrain, with the Yemenis taking the lead twice, to end their losing streak to Saudi Arabia since 2002. Yet, Yemen slumped later after receiving a 0–5 demolition from Uzbekistan, before beating Palestine 1–0 to gain its first major win in this qualification round. However, disappointment would soon return when Yemen suffered a heartbreaking loss to Singapore 1–2 and put its qualification at risk. Ultimately, Yemen failed to gain any further momentum, losing to both Saudi Arabia, Uzbekistan and Palestine in the end.

Yemen played in the 2026 FIFA World Cup qualification first round against Sri Lanka in where they would play their home ground in Saudi Arabia due to the ongoing civil war in Yemen. On 12 October 2023, Yemen secured a 3–0 win over Sri Lanka at the Damac Club Stadium in Khamis Mushait.

Yemen was drawn in the final round of the 2027 AFC Asian Cup qualification on Group B with Lebanon, Bhutan and Brunei. On 28 December 2024, Yemen secured their first ever win in the Arabian Gulf Cup, by achieving a 2–1 victory over Bahrain during the 26th edition.

== Results and fixtures ==
The following is a list of match results in the last 12 months, as well as any future matches that have been scheduled. Yemen currently play their home matches at a neutral venue due to the ongoing Yemeni civil war.

Win Draw Loss Fixture

=== 2025 ===
26 November 2025 FIFA Arab Cup qualification	Yemen	4–4 (2–4 p)	Comoros	Doha, Qatar
19:00 UTC+3	Al-Zubaidi 14'; Al-Gahwashi 40'; Al-Matari 45+2', 65'	Report	Zakouani 30' (pen.); Anbar 61' (o.g.); Amir 90+1' (pen.), 90+3'	Stadium: Grand Hamad Stadium; Referee: Cristián Garay (Chile)
	Penalties
	Al-Zubaidi (penalty scored); Al-Golan (penalty scored); Al-Wasmani (penalty missed); Al-Gahwashi (penalty missed)		Kari (penalty scored); Zakouani (penalty scored); Djae (penalty scored); Amir (penalty scored)

=== 2026 ===
4 June 2027 Asian Cup qualification third round	Lebanon	0–2	Yemen	Doha, Qatar
19:00 UTC+3		Report	Al-Gahwashi 63', 90'	Stadium: Grand Hamad Stadium; Attendance: 2,038; Referee: Clifford Daypuyat (Philippines)

18 September Friendly	Kuwait	1–2	Yemen	Jeddah, Saudi Arabia
19:30 UTC+3	Al-Enezi	Report	Al-Dahi; Ahmed Maher	Stadium: TBD

24 September 27th Arabian Gulf Cup Group B	United Arab Emirates	4–0	Yemen	Jeddah, Saudi Arabia
18:55 UTC+3	Giménez 26', 51'; Sahal 36' (o.g.); Pereira 45+1'	Report		Stadium: King_Abdullah Sports City Stadium; Attendance: 10,138; Referee: Qasim Al-Hatmi (Oman)

27 September 27th Arabian Gulf Cup Group B	Yemen	0–1	Qatar	Jeddah, Saudi Arabia
18:55 UTC+3		Report	Abdurisag 64'	Stadium: King_Abdullah Sports City Stadium; Attendance: 8,398; Referee: Adham Makhadmeh (Jordan)

30 September 27th Arabian Gulf Cup Group B	Bahrain	2–5	Yemen	Jeddah, Saudi Arabia
20:30 UTC+3	Al-Doseri 7'; Madan 67'	Report	Al-Gahwashi 18'; Al-Matari 31'; Al-Wasmani 40', 90+5'	Stadium: Prince Abdullah Al-Faisal Sports City Stadium; Attendance: 6,403; Referee: Zaid Thamer Mohammed (Iraq)

14 November Friendly	Bahrain	3–1	Yemen	Zhaoqing, China
14:00 UTC+8	Helal 36' (pen.); Al-Aswad 45'; Al-Surabi 72' (o.g.)	Report	Sabarah 22'	Stadium: Zhaoqing New District Sports Center Stadium; Attendance: 221; Referee: Shen Yinhao (China)

17 November Friendly	Malaysia	2–1	Yemen	Zhaoqing, China
14:00 UTC+8	Chin 7', 57'	Report	Al-Sheraji 77'	Stadium: Zhaoqing New District Sports Center Stadium; Attendance: 208; Referee: Zhang Lei (China)

=== 2027 ===
10 January 2027 Asian Cup Group E	South Korea	v	Yemen	Jeddah, Saudi Arabia
--:--				Stadium: King Abdullah Sports City Stadium

15 January 2027 Asian Cup Group E	Yemen	v	United Arab Emirates	Riyadh, Saudi Arabia
--:--				Stadium: King Fahd Sports City Stadium

20 January 2027 Asian Cup Group E	Vietnam	v	Yemen	Jeddah, Saudi Arabia
--:--				Stadium: Prince Abdullah Al Faisal Sports City Stadium

== Coaching history ==
Caretaker managers are listed in italics

- (United Arab Republic) Zaki Osman (1970)
- (England) Alan Gillett (1977)
- (Soviet Union) Timur Segizbayev (1979–1982)
- (Yemen Arab Republic) Dr. Azzam Khalifa (Note: Dr. Azzam Khalifa served as the first coach of the unified Yemen football team.) (1989–1990)
- (Brazil) Luciano de Abreu (1993–1994)
- (Yemen) Ali Saleh Abad (1996)
- (Yemen) Omar Bashami (1996)
- (Yemen) Mojahed Al Saraha (1997)
- (Iraq) Hazem Jassam (1997)
- (Yemen) Salem Abdel Rahman (1997)
- (Iraq) Hazem Jassam (1997–1999)
- (Brazil) Roberto Fernandes (1999)
- (Serbia and Montenegro) Zoran Đorđević (1999–2000)
- (Brazil) Luciano de Abreu (2000–2002)
- (Egypt) Mahmoud Abou-Regaila (2002)
- (Germany) Torsten Spittler (Note: Torsten Spittler, the youth national team coach, was selected by the YFA to take charge of the team at the 2002 Arab Cup with a squad composed of youth team and senior players. However, after one friendly match, the FA overturned this decision and appointed Hazem Jassam instead.) (2002)
- (Yemen) Abdullah Saqr Baamer (Note: Abdullah Saqr Baamer served as caretaker coach during the 2002 Arab Cup due to coach Hazem Jassam being unable to obtain a visa as he was blacklisted by the host nation of Kuwait.) (2002)
- (Iraq) Hazem Jassam (2002–2003)
- (Yemen) Ahmed Ali Qasem (2003)
- (Serbia and Montenegro) Milan Živadinović (2003–2004)
- (Yemen) Amine Al-Sunaini (2004)
- (Algeria) Rabah Saâdane (2004–2005)
- (Yemen) Ahmed Alraay (2006)
- (Egypt) Mohsen Saleh (2006–2009)
- (Yemen) Hamza Al Jamal (2009)
- (Yemen) Sami Hasan Al Nash (2009)
- (Croatia) Srećko Juričić (2009–2010)
- (Yemen) Amine Al-Sunaini (2010–2012)
- (Yemen) Sami Hasan Al Nash (2012)
- (Belgium) Tom Saintfiet (2012–2013)
- (Yemen) Sami Hasan Al Nash (2013)
- (Serbia) Vladimir Petrović (2013–2014)
- (Czech Republic) Miroslav Soukup (2014–2015)
- (Yemen) Amine Al-Sunaini (2015–2016)
- (Yemen) Ahmed Ali Qasem (2016)
- (Ethiopia) Abraham Mebratu (2016–2018)
- (Slovakia) Ján Kocian (2018–2019)
- (Yemen) Sami Hasan Al Nash (2019–2021)
- (Yemen) Ahmed Ali Qasem (2021)
- (Croatia) Nenad Nikolić (2021)
- (Syria) Fajr Ibrahim (2021)
- (Yemen) Amin Al-Sanini (2022)
- (Algeria) Adel Amrouche (2022)
- (Czech Republic) Miroslav Soukup (2022–2024)
- (Algeria) Noureddine Ould Ali (2024–present)

== Players ==
=== Current squad ===
The following 24 players were called up for the friendly matches against Bahrain and Malaysia in November 2026.

Information correct as of 17 November 2026, after the match against Malaysia.

No.	Pos.	Player	Date of birth (age)	Caps	Goals	Club
	GK	Abdullah Al-Saadi	23 April 2002 (age 24)	11	0	(Yemen Football Association) Al-Sha'ab Hadramaut
	GK	Osamah Mokref	1 March 2005 (age 21)	1	0	(Yemen Football Association) Al-Wahda Sanaa
	GK	Osama Haidar	22 May 1999 (age 27)	0	0	(Yemen Football Association) Al-Ahli Sanaa
	DF	Rami Al-Wasmani	1 February 1997 (age 29)	20	2	Free agent
	DF	Nader Sahal	1 January 1990 (age 36)	9	0	(Saudi Arabian Football Federation) Bisha
	DF	Hamzah Al-Surabi	6 December 2006 (age 19)	7	0	(Yemen Football Association) Al-Yarmuk Al-Rawda
	DF	Emad Al-Godaimah	11 March 2003 (age 23)	6	0	(Yemen Football Association) Al-Wahda Sanaa
	DF	Ali Al-Dugin	2 May 2003 (age 23)	3	0	(Yemen Football Association) Al-Sha'ab Hadramaut
	DF	Faisal Maroof	1 March 2003 (age 23)	1	0	(Yemen Football Association) Al-Tilal
	MF	Abdulwasea Al-Matari (captain)	4 July 1994 (age 32)	81	15	(Iraq Football Association) Diyala
	MF	Osama Anbar	20 January 1995 (age 31)	27	0	(Yemen Football Association) Al-Sha'ab Hadramaut
	MF	Omar Al-Golan	1 January 2000 (age 26)	17	1	(Yemen Football Association) Al-Tadamun Hadramaut
	MF	Mohammed Al-Najjar	8 April 1997 (age 29)	11	0	(Yemen Football Association) Al-Wahda Sanaa
	MF	Nawaf Abdullah	31 December 1994 (age 31)	9	0	(Bahrain Football Association) Malkiya
	MF	Haider Aslam	11 July 1994 (age 32)	5	0	(Yemen Football Association) Al-Ahli Sanaa
	MF	Rauf Al-Sheraji	30 June 2002 (age 24)	2	1	(Hungarian Football Federation) Debreceni EAC
	MF	Mohammed Al-Mansouri	Unknown	2	0	(Yemen Football Association) Al-Tadamun Hadramaut
	FW	Omar Al-Dahi	15 December 1999 (age 26)	41	6	Free agent
	FW	Abdul Majeed Sabarah	22 August 2000 (age 26)	24	4	(Yemen Football Association) Al-Sha'ab Hadramaut'
	FW	Mamdooh Bin Ajaj	26 August 2003 (age 23)	11	0	(Yemen Football Association) Al-Tadamun Hadramaut
	FW	D'Mani Mellor	20 September 2000 (age 26)	5	0	(The Football Association) Forest Green Rovers

=== Recent call-ups ===
The following players have been called up to the national team in the past 12 months but are not part of the current squad.

Pos.	Player	Date of birth (age)	Caps	Goals	Club	Latest call-up
GK	Mohammed Aman	14 April 1997 (age 29)	21	0	(Yemen) Al-Sha'ab Hadramaut	27th Arabian Gulf Cup
DF	Harwan Al-Zubaidi	15 October 1999 (age 27)	24	4	(United States) Miami FC	v. Bahrain, 14 November 2026 ^{WD}
DF	Hamza Al-Rimi	12 February 2002 (age 24)	25	0	(Iraq) Al-Gharraf	27th Arabian Gulf Cup
DF	Radhawan Al-Hubaishi	3 July 1993 (age 33)	18	0	(Yemen) Al-Tadamun Hadramaut	27th Arabian Gulf Cup
DF	Saqr Al-Darbi	2 April 2001 (age 25)	0	0	(Yemen) Al-Ahli Sanaa	27th Arabian Gulf Cup
DF	Mohammed Al-Batool	26 December 2004 (age 21)	11	0	(Yemen) Al-Wahda Sanaa	27th Arabian Gulf Cup ^{PRE}
DF	Amr Talal	1 January 1995 (age 31)	2	0	Free agent	v. Lebanon, 4 June 2026
DF	Ahmed Al-Wajeeh	17 July 2002 (age 24)	17	0	Free agent	v. Comoros, 26 November 2025
MF	Adel Abbas Qasem	1 March 2008 (age 18)	8	2	(Saudi Arabia) Al-Shabab U21	v. Bahrain, 14 November 2026 ^{INJ}
MF	Nasser Al-Gahwashi	24 May 1999 (age 27)	40	17	(Kuwait) Kazma	27th Arabian Gulf Cup
MF	Anes Al-Maari	9 January 2000 (age 26)	20	0	(Iraq) Al-Gharraf	27th Arabian Gulf Cup
MF	Tareq Shihab	7 March 2001 (age 25)	5	0	(Iceland) ÍR	27th Arabian Gulf Cup
MF	Amin Farouk	22 July 2003 (age 23)	0	0	(Germany) SC Verl	27th Arabian Gulf Cup ^{PRE}
MF	Yousef Al-Haimi	24 December 2002 (age 23)	0	0	(Yemen) Al-Ahli Sanaa	v. Lebanon, 4 June 2026
FW	Ahmed Maher	24 January 2002 (age 24)	20	1	(Yemen) Al-Wehda Sanaa	27th Arabian Gulf Cup
FW	Gassem Al-Sharafi	15 October 2004 (age 22)	5	0	(Yemen) Al-Wehda Sanaa	27th Arabian Gulf Cup ^{PRE}
FW	Abdulaziz Masnoum	6 February 2006 (age 20)	5	1	(Yemen) Al-Tadamun Hadramaut	v. Lebanon, 4 June 2026
Notes: ^{INJ} Withdrew due to injury; ^{PRE} Preliminary squad; ^{SUS} Serving suspension; ^{WD} Withdrew due to non-injury issue

=== Former squads ===
- 2002 Arab Cup squad
- 2012 Arab Cup squad
- 2019 AFC Asian Cup squad

== Records ==
As of 30 September 2026
Players in bold are still active with Yemen.

=== Most appearances ===
Rank	Player	Caps	Goals	Career
1	Alaa Al-Sasi	84	9	2006–2019
2	Salem Saeed	82	0	2002–2019
3	**Abdulwasea Al-Matari**	79	15	2013–present
4	Akram Al-Worafi	71	6	2004–2017
5	Mudir Al-Radaei	67	1	2012–2023
6	Ali Al-Nono	66	30	2000–2010
7	Mohammed Boqshan	55	1	2012–2021
7	Mohammed Fuad Omar	55	1	2012–2019
9	**Ahmed Al-Sarori**	51	2	2015–present
10	Mohammed Ayash	44	0	2007–2021

=== Top goalscorers ===
Rank	Player	Goals	Caps	Ratio	Career
1	Ali Al-Nono	30	66	0.45	2000–2010
2	**Nasser Al-Gahwashi**	17	37	0.43	2019–present
3	Adel Al-Salimi	15	25	0.6	2000–2004
3	**Abdulwasea Al-Matari**	15	79	0.19	2013–present
5	Alaa Al-Sasi	9	85	0.11	2006–2019
6	Nashwan Al-Haggam	7	16	0.44	2002–2007
6	Yaser Ba Suhai	7	42	0.17	2003–2015
8	Fekri Al-Hubaishi	6	17	0.35	2000–2007
8	**Omar Al-Dahi**	6	40	0.15	2019–present
8	Ali Awad Al-Omqi	6	42	0.14	2001–2009
8	Akram Al-Worafi	6	71	0.08	2004–2017

== Competitive record ==
=== FIFA World Cup ===
FIFA World Cup record									Qualification record					
Year	Result	Position	Pld	W	D*	L	GF	GA	Pld	W	D	L	GF	GA
as Kingdom of Yemen
(Uruguay) 1930	Not a FIFA member								Not a FIFA member					
(Italy) 1934	Not a FIFA member								Not a FIFA member					
(France) 1938	Not a FIFA member								Not a FIFA member					
(Brazil) 1950	Not a FIFA member								Not a FIFA member					
(Switzerland) 1954	Not a FIFA member								Not a FIFA member					
(Sweden) 1958	Not a FIFA member								Not a FIFA member					
(Chile) 1962	Not a FIFA member								Not a FIFA member					
as North Yemen
(England) 1966	Not a FIFA member								Not a FIFA member					
(Mexico) 1970	Not a FIFA member								Not a FIFA member					
(West Germany) 1974	Not a FIFA member								Not a FIFA member					
(Argentina) 1978	Not a FIFA member								Not a FIFA member					
(Spain) 1982	Did not enter								Did not enter					
(Mexico) 1986	Did not qualify								4	0	0	4	1	12
(Italy) 1990	Did not qualify								4	0	0	4	0	5
as Yemen
(United States) 1994	Did not qualify								8	3	2	3	12	13
(France) 1998	Did not qualify								6	2	2	2	10	7
(South Korea) (Japan) 2002	Did not qualify								6	3	2	1	14	8
(Germany) 2006	Did not qualify								6	1	2	3	6	11
(South Africa) 2010	Did not qualify								4	1	1	2	4	4
(Brazil) 2014	Did not qualify								2	0	1	1	0	2
(Russia) 2018	Did not qualify								10	2	1	7	5	18
(Qatar) 2022	Did not qualify								8	1	2	5	6	18
(Canada) (Mexico) (United States) 2026	Did not qualify								8	2	3	3	9	10
(Morocco) (Portugal) (Spain) 2030	To be determined								To be determined					
(Saudi Arabia) 2034	To be determined								To be determined					
Total	–	0/12	–	–	–	–	–	–	66	15	16	35	67	108

=== AFC Asian Cup ===
AFC Asian Cup record										Qualification record					
Year	Result	Position	Pld	W	D*	L	GF	GA	Squad	Pld	W	D	L	GF	GA
as Kingdom of Yemen
(Hong Kong) 1956	Not an AFC member									Not an AFC member					
(South Korea) 1960	Not an AFC member									Not an AFC member					
as North Yemen
(Israel) 1964	Not an AFC member									Not an AFC member					
(Iran) 1968	Not an AFC member									Not an AFC member					
(Thailand) 1972	Not an AFC member									Not an AFC member					
(Iran) 1976	Not an AFC member									Not an AFC member					
(Kuwait) 1980	Not an AFC member									Not an AFC member					
(Singapore) 1984	Did not qualify									4	0	0	4	2	18
(Qatar) 1988	Did not qualify									5	1	3	1	5	5
as Yemen
(Japan) 1992	Did not enter									Did not enter					
(United Arab Emirates) 1996	Did not qualify									4	1	0	3	2	8
(Lebanon) 2000	Did not qualify									4	2	0	2	14	5
(China) 2004	Did not qualify									6	2	1	3	15	15
(Indonesia) (Malaysia) (Thailand) (Vietnam) 2007	Did not qualify									6	2	0	4	5	13
(Qatar) 2011	Did not qualify									6	2	1	3	7	9
(Australia) 2015	Did not qualify									6	0	0	6	3	18
(United Arab Emirates) 2019	Group stage	23rd	3	0	0	3	0	10	Squad	18	6	5	7	16	23
(Qatar) 2023	Did not qualify									11	1	3	7	6	25
(Saudi Arabia) 2027	Qualified									14	6	5	3	29	11
Total	Group stage	2/19	3	0	0	3	0	10	—	84	23	18	43	104	150

=== Asian Games ===
Asian Games record
Year	Position	Pld	W	D	L	GF	GA
as North Yemen
1951 to 1978	Did not participate						
(India) 1982	Withdrew						
(South Korea) 1986	Did not participate						
as Yemen
(China) 1990	Group stage	3	0	2	1	0	2
(Japan) 1994	Group stage	4	0	0	4	0	14
(Thailand) 1998	Did not participate						
2002 to present	See Yemen national under-23 football team						
Total	2/13	7	0	2	5	0	16

=== Gulf Cup ===
Gulf Cup record
Year	Position	Pld	W	D	L	GF	GA
(Kuwait) 2003–04	Seventh place	6	0	1	5	2	18
(Qatar) 2004	Group stage	3	0	1	2	1	6
(United Arab Emirates) 2007	Group stage	3	0	1	2	3	5
(Oman) 2009	Group stage	3	0	0	3	2	11
(Yemen) 2010	Group stage	3	0	0	3	1	9
(Bahrain) 2013	Group stage	3	0	0	3	0	6
(Saudi Arabia) 2014	Group stage	3	0	2	1	0	1
(Kuwait) 2017–18	Group stage	3	0	0	3	0	8
(Qatar) 2019	Group stage	3	0	1	2	0	9
(Iraq) 2023	Group stage	3	0	0	3	2	10
(Kuwait) 2024–25	Group stage	3	1	0	2	4	5
(Saudi Arabia) 2026	Group stage	3	1	0	2	5	7
Total	12/27	39	2	6	31	20	95

=== Arab Cup ===
FIFA Arab Cup record
Year	Position	Pld	W	D	L	GF	GA
as North Yemen
(Lebanon) 1963	Did not enter						
(Kuwait) 1964	Did not enter						
(Iraq) 1966	Group stage	3	0	0	3	0	27
(Saudi Arabia) 1985	Did not enter						
(Jordan) 1988	Did not enter						
as Yemen
(Syria) 1992	Did not enter						
(Qatar) 1998	Withdrew						
(Kuwait) 2002	Group stage	4	0	1	3	5	13
(Saudi Arabia) 2012	Group stage	3	1	0	2	3	7
(Qatar) 2021	Did not qualify						
(Qatar) 2025	Did not qualify						
Total	3/11	10	1	1	8	8	47

=== Arab Games ===
Arab Games record
Year	Position	Pld	W	D	L	GF	GA
as North Yemen
(Egypt) 1953	Did not enter						
(Lebanon) 1957	Did not enter						
(Morocco) 1961	Did not enter						
(United Arab Republic) 1965	Did not enter						
(Syria) 1976	Did not enter						
(Morocco) 1985	Group stage	3	1	0	2	3	6
as Yemen
(Lebanon) 1997	Did not enter						
(Jordan) 1999	Did not enter						
(Egypt) 2007	Did not enter						
(Qatar) 2011	Did not enter						
(Algeria) 2023	Did not enter						
Total	1/11	3	1	0	2	3	6

=== WAFF Championship ===
WAFF Championship record
Year	Position	Pld	W	D	L	GF	GA
(Jordan) 2000	Did not enter						
(Syria) 2002	Did not enter						
(Iran) 2004	Did not enter						
(Jordan) 2007	Did not enter						
(Iran) 2008	Did not enter						
(Jordan) 2010	Semi-finals	3	1	1	1	5	4
(Kuwait) 2012	Group stage	3	0	0	3	1	4
(Qatar) 2014	Withdrew						
(Iraq) 2019	Group stage	4	1	1	2	4	5
(Oman) 2026	Qualified						
Total	4/10	10	2	2	6	10	13

== Head-to-head record ==
The list shown below shows the Yemen national football team all-time international record against opposing nations from 1990–present

Positive Record Neutral Record Negative Record

As of 30 Sep 2026 after match against Bahrain

All friendly and international matches have been approved, except for Olympic matches. A-level matches

Yemen national football team head-to-head records
Team	Pld	W	D	L	GF	GA	GD	Best win	Worst loss
Bahrain	20	4	3	13	16	39	−23	5–2	1–5, 0–4
Bangladesh	1	0	0	1	0	1	−1	X	0–1
Bhutan	5	4	1	0	30	3	+27	11–2	X
Brunei	4	4	0	0	17	0	+17	9–0	X
Cambodia	2	2	0	0	8	0	+8	7–0	X
Chad	1	0	1	0	0	0	0	X	X
China	3	1	0	2	1	5	−4	1–0	0–4
Comoros	2	1	1	0	6	4	+2	2–0	X
Djibouti	1	1	0	0	4	1	+3	4–1	X
Egypt	1	0	0	1	0	1	–1	X	0–1
Eritrea	1	1	0	0	4	1	+3	4–1	X
Ethiopia	2	0	1	1	1	2	−1	X	0–1
Finland	1	0	1	0	0	0	0	X	X
Hong Kong	3	1	1	1	1	2	−1	1–0	0–2
India	7	5	2	0	19	8	+11	6–3	X
Indonesia	6	0	4	2	3	7	−4	X	0–3
Iran	3	0	0	3	1	11	−10	X	0–5
Iraq	15	0	3	12	7	36	−29	X	0–5,1–6
Japan	4	0	0	4	3	8	−5	X	0–2
Jordan	3	0	2	1	2	6	−4	X	0–4
Kenya	1	1	0	0	3	1	+2	3–1	X
Kuwait	10	0	5	5	4	18	−14	X	0–4
Kyrgyzstan	2	1	0	1	2	3	−1	1–0	1–3
Lebanon	5	2	1	2	7	7	0	2–0	2–4
Libya	3	0	1	2	2	5	-3	2–0	1–3
Malawi	1	1	0	0	1	0	+1	1–0	X
Malaysia	4	1	0	3	3	5	−2	1–0	1–4
Maldives	4	3	0	1	7	2	+5	3–0	0–2
Mauritania	1	0	0	1	0	2	−2	X	0–2
Mexico	1	0	0	1	0	2	−2	X	0–2
Mongolia	1	0	0	1	0	2	−2	X	0–2
Morocco	1	0	0	1	0	4	−4	X	0–4
Nepal	6	4	2	0	11	3	+8	3–0	X
Nigeria	1	0	0	1	0	2	−2	X	0–2
North Korea	5	0	2	3	3	8	−5	X	0–3
Oman	13	0	2	11	5	23	−18	X	0–4
Pakistan	4	3	1	0	11	2	+9	5–1	X
Palestine	7	2	0	5	5	13	−8	3–1	0–5
Philippines	5	1	3	1	4	5	−1	1–0	0–2
Qatar	11	0	1	10	3	33	−30	X	0–6
Saudi Arabia	19	0	2	17	7	54	−47	X	0–7
Senegal	1	1	0	1	4	2	+2	4–1	0–1
Singapore	2	0	1	1	3	4	-1	X	1-2
South Korea	1	0	0	1	0	6	−6	X	0–6
Sri Lanka	4	2	1	1	6	2	+4	3–0	0–1
Sudan	3	1	1	1	5	5	0	3-2	1-2
Syria	7	2	1	4	8	18	−10	2–1	2–8
Tajikistan	4	2	1	1	4	3	+1	2–1	0–1
Tanzania	3	2	1	0	5	3	+2	2–1	X
Thailand	5	0	3	2	2	6	−4	X	0–3
Turkmenistan	3	0	0	3	1	7	−6	X	0–4
Uganda	1	0	1	0	2	2	0	X	X
United Arab Emirates	14	2	0	12	11	35	−24	3–1	0–4
Uzbekistan	6	0	0	6	2	16	−14	X	0–5
Vietnam	1	0	0	1	0	2	−2	X	0–2
Zambia	2	0	1	1	2	3	−1	X	0–1
Zimbabwe	2	1	0	1	1	1	0	1-0	0–1
Total	425	293	184	247	937	819	+118		

^{^} Include North Vietnam

== See also ==
- Yemen national football team results
- Yemen national under-23 football team
- Yemen national under-20 football team
- Yemen national under-17 football team
- North Yemen national football team
- South Yemen national football team
