= 2018–19 Al-Mina'a SC season =

Al-Mina'a SC
2018–19 season
- Chairman: Asaad Abdul Razzaq (interim) (until 8 December); Hadi Ahmed (from 8 December)
- Manager: Aqeel Hato (until 7 February); Hicham Ghazia (7–25 February); Emad Aoda (25 February–22 May); Ahmad Sabri (22 May–22 July); Valeriu Tița (from 2 July)
- Ground: Basra Sports City (temporary use)
- Premier League: 17th
- FA Cup: Round of 32
- Top goalscorer: League: Mohammed Jabbar Shokan (14 goals); All: Mohammed Jabbar Shokan (14 goals)
| Home colours | Away colours |

The 2018–19 season will be Al-Minaa's 43nd season in the Iraqi Premier League, having featured in all 45 editions of the competition except two. Al-Minaa are participating in the Iraqi Premier League and the Iraq FA Cup.

They enter this season having finished in a disappointing 15th place in the league in the 2017–18 season, and will be looking to wrestle back the title they won in the 1977–78 season.

== Squad ==
Note: Flags indicate national team as defined under FIFA eligibility rules; some limited exceptions apply. Players may hold more than one non-FIFA nationality.

| No. | Pos. | Nation | Player |
|---|---|---|---|
| 1 | GK | IRQ | Hussam Mahdi |
| 2 | DF | IRQ | Abbas Badie |
| 3 | DF | IRQ | Ali Qasim |
| 4 | MF | IRQ | Alaa Jawad |
| 5 | MF | IRQ | Sadeq Sami |
| 6 | MF | CMR | Didier Talla |
| 7 | MF | IRQ | Hussein Abdul Wahed |
| 8 | MF | IRQ | Ahmed Farhan |
| 9 | FW | IRQ | Sultan Jassim (captain) |
| 10 | MF | IRQ | Hussam Malik |
| 11 | DF | IRQ | Aqeel Mahdi |
| 12 | FW | IRQ | Mohammed Hatem |
| 15 | DF | IRQ | Hussein Falah |

| No. | Pos. | Nation | Player |
|---|---|---|---|
| 17 | DF | IRQ | Haidar Sari |
| 19 | FW | IRQ | Ahmed Zamel |
| 20 | GK | IRQ | Karrar Ibrahim |
| 22 | GK | IRQ | Yassin Karim |
| 23 | DF | IRQ | Mohammed Jabbar Rubat |
| 25 | MF | IRQ | Omar Jabbar |
| 30 | MF | IRQ | Hamza Talib |
| 33 | DF | GHA | Nuru Sulley |
| 35 | DF | IRQ | Abdullah Mohsin |
| 40 | GK | IRQ | Hameed Battal |
| 53 | DF | IRQ | Hamza Adnan |
| 77 | MF | IRQ | Mustafa Hadi Ahmed |
| 99 | FW | IRQ | Mohammed Jabbar Shokan |

== Transfers ==
=== In ===
| # | Position | Player | Transferred from | Fee | Date | Source |
|---|---|---|---|---|---|---|
| 20 | GK | (Iraq) Karrar Ibrahim | (Iraq) Naft Al-Janoob | Free transfer | 20 September 2018 | |
| 32 | DF | (Iraq) Jassim Mohammed | (Iraq) Al-Bahri | Free transfer | 20 September 2018 | |
| 7 | MF | (Iraq) Hussein Abdul Wahed | (Iraq) Al-Talaba | Free transfer | 20 September 2018 | |
| 11 | MF | (Iraq) Aqeel Mahdi | (Iraq) Karbalaa | Free transfer | 20 September 2018 | |
| 14 | MF | (Iraq) Ali Majed | (Iraq) Al-Diwaniya | Free transfer | 20 September 2018 | |
| 4 | MF | (Iraq) Alaa Jawad | (Iraq) Masafi Al-Janoob | Free transfer | 20 September 2018 | |
| 19 | FW | (Iraq) Ahmed Zamel | (Iraq) Masafi Al-Janoob | Free transfer | 20 September 2018 | |
| 9 | FW | (Iraq) Sultan Jassim | (Iraq) Naft Maysan | Free transfer | 20 September 2018 | |
| 5 | MF | (Iraq) Sadeq Sami | Youth system | n/a | 20 September 2018 | |
| 13 | DF | (Iraq) Ali Mohammed Kanoosh | Youth system | n/a | 20 September 2018 | |
| 29 | DF | (Serbia) Goran Obradović | (Armenia) Ararat Yerevan | Free transfer | 15 October 2018 | |
| 24 | MF | (Iraq) Jawad Kadhim | (Iraq) Al-Quwa Al-Jawiya | Free transfer | 4 January 2019 | |
| 77 | MF | (Iraq) Mustafa Hadi Ahmed | (Iraq) Al-Bahri | Free transfer | 10 January 2019 | |
| 99 | FW | (Iraq) Mohammed Jabbar Shokan | (Iraq) Al-Shorta | Free transfer | 20 January 2019 | |
| 12 | FW | (Iraq) Mohammed Hatem | (Iraq) Amanat Baghdad | Free transfer | 21 January 2019 | |
| 53 | DF | (Iraq) Hamza Adnan | (Iraq) Al-Zawraa | Free transfer | 24 January 2019 | |
| 25 | MF | (Iraq) Omar Jabbar | (Iraq) Al-Zawraa | Free transfer | 24 January 2019 | |
| 33 | DF | (Ghana) Nuru Sulley | (Turkey) Alanyaspor | Free transfer | 31 January 2019 | |

=== Out ===
| # | Position | Player | Transferred to | Fee | Date | Source |
|---|---|---|---|---|---|---|
| 5 | MF | (Iraq) Ahmed Mohsin Ashour | (Iraq) Al-Zawraa | Free transfer | 25 July 2018 | |
| 8 | MF | (Iraq) Ali Husni | (Iraq) Al-Quwa Al-Jawiya | Free transfer | 27 July 2018 | |
| 3 | DF | (Iraq) Hamza Adnan | (Iraq) Al-Zawraa | Free transfer | 28 July 2018 | |
| 25 | MF | (Iraq) Omar Jabbar | (Iraq) Al-Zawraa | Free transfer | 28 July 2018 | |
| 11 | MF | (Iraq) Ahmed Jalil Hanoon | (Iraq) Al-Talaba | Free transfer | 3 August 2018 | |
| 20 | GK | (Iraq) Saqr Ajail | (Iraq) Naft Al-Janoob | Free transfer | 9 August 2018 | |
| 21 | DF | (Iraq) Herdi Siamand | (Iraq) Al-Naft | Free transfer | 11 August 2018 | |
| 9 | MF | (Iraq) Mohammed Jaffal | (Iraq) Erbil | Free transfer | 23 August 2018 | |
| 12 | FW | (Egypt) Ahmed Yasser | (Egypt) Al-Masry | End of loan | 20 September 2018 | |
| 26 | DF | (Iraq) Ammar Kadhim | (Iraq) Amanat Baghdad | Free transfer | 20 September 2018 | |
| 4 | MF | (Iraq) Osama Ali | Released | n/a | 20 September 2018 | |
| 42 | FW | (Iraq) Mustafa Karim | (Iraq) Naft Al-Wasat | Free transfer | 23 September 2018 | |
| 26 | DF | (Iraq) Ali Mohammed Kanoosh | (Iraq) Al-Bahri | Free transfer | 24 January 2019 | |
| 18 | MF | (Iraq) Hussein Mohammed | Released | n/a | 24 January 2019 | |
| 32 | DF | (Iraq) Jassim Mohammed | Released | n/a | 24 January 2019 | |
| 33 | MF | (Iraq) Haider Ali | (Iraq) Al-Sinaat Al-Kahrabaiya | Free transfer | 30 January 2019 | |
| 28 | FW | (Croatia) Edin Junuzović | Released | n/a | 22 March 2019 | |
| 29 | DF | (Serbia) Goran Obradović | Released | n/a | 31 March 2019 | |
| 24 | MF | (Iraq) Jawad Kadhim | Released | n/a | 18 May 2019 | |

== Personnel ==
=== Technical staff ===
| Position | Name | Nationality |
|---|---|---|
| Manager: | Ahmad Sabri ^{(caretaker)} | (Iraq) |
| Goalkeeping coach: | Saddam Salman | (Iraq) |
| Fitness coach: | Hicham Ghazia | (Tunisia) |
| Administrative director: | Jihad Madlool | (Iraq) |
| Club doctor: | Faris Abdullah | (Iraq) |

Updated to match played 22 May 2019
Source: alghadpress.com

=== Board members ===
| Position | Name | Nationality |
|---|---|---|
| President: | Hadi Ahmed | (Iraq) |
| Vice-president: | Ali Talib Sharhan | (Iraq) |
| Secretary: | ~~Karim Salem Juma~~ | (Iraq) |
| Treasurer: | Ali Kadhim Mubarak | (Iraq) |
| Member of the Board: | Nazar Taha Humoud | (Iraq) |
| Member of the Board: | Jihad Madlool Obaid | (Iraq) |
| Member of the Board: | Taher Balas | (Iraq) |
| Member of the Board: | Nabeel Abdul Ameer Jamil | (Iraq) |
| Member of the Board: | Ahmed Hamed Al-Jaberi | (Iraq) |
| Member of the Board: | Mohammad Jaber Al-Jaberi | (Iraq) |

Updated to match played 8 December 2018
Source: Alsumaria.tv

== Club ==
=== Kits ===
Supplier: Adidas / Sponsor: GCPI

| Home | Home alt. | Home alt. 2 | Away | Away alt. | Away alt. 2 |

== Stadium ==
During the previous season, the stadium of Al-Mina'a was demolished. A company will build a new stadium that will be completed in 2020. Since they can't play their games at Al Mina'a Stadium, they will be playing at Basra Sports City during this season.

== Friendlies ==
Win Draw Loss

| 15 March 2019 Friendly | Al-Sinaa | 3 – 2 | Al-Minaa | Baghdad, Iraq |
| 12:00 GMT | Hamed 4'; Jalal 39'; 72' | | Hatem 9'; Hadi 20'; Farhan (red card) 50' | Stadium: Al-Sinaa Stadium |

| 17 March 2019 Friendly | Al-Sinaat Al-Kahrabaiya | 1 – 0 | Al-Minaa | Baghdad, Iraq |
| 12:00 GMT | Taha 21' | | | Stadium: Al-Zawraa Stadium |

| 19 March 2019 Friendly | Amanat Baghdad | 0 – 1 | Al-Minaa | Baghdad, Iraq |
| 12:00 GMT | | | Shokan 75' | Stadium: Amanat Baghdad Stadium |

== Iraqi Premier League ==
=== League table ===
| Pos | Team | Pld | W | D | L | GF | GA | GD | Pts | Qualification or relegation |
|---|---|---|---|---|---|---|---|---|---|---|
| 15 | Naft Al-Junoob | 38 | 11 | 9 | 18 | 37 | 53 | −16 | 42 | |
| 16 | Al-Sinaat Al-Kahrabaiya | 38 | 9 | 14 | 15 | 30 | 38 | −8 | 41 | |
| 17 | Al-Minaa | 38 | 8 | 16 | 14 | 34 | 42 | −8 | 40 | |
| 18 | Al-Samawa | 38 | 8 | 9 | 21 | 26 | 59 | −33 | 33 | |
| 19 | Al-Bahri (R) | 38 | 6 | 11 | 21 | 39 | 66 | −27 | 29 | Relegation to the Iraqi First Division League |

Source: Kooora
Rules for classification: 1) points; 2) goal difference; 3) number of goals scored.
(R) Relegated

=== Summary table ===
| Overall | | | | | | | | Home | | | | | | Away | | | | | |
| Pld | W | D | L | GF | GA | GD | Pts | W | D | L | GF | GA | GD | W | D | L | GF | GA | GD |
|---|---|---|---|---|---|---|---|---|---|---|---|---|---|---|---|---|---|---|---|
| 38 | 8 | 16 | 14 | 34 | 42 | −8 | 40 | 6 | 11 | 2 | 20 | 13 | +7 | 2 | 5 | 12 | 14 | 29 | −15 |

Last updated: 22 July 2019.
Source: Goalzz.com

=== Matches ===
| 17 September 2018 1 | Al-Samawa | 0 – 0 | Al-Mina'a | Samawa |
| 12:45 GMT | | | | Stadium: As Samawah Stadium; Referee: Feed Karim |

| 24 September 2018 2 | Al-Karkh | 2 – 1 | Al-Mina'a | Baghdad |
| 12:30 GMT | Jabbar 30'; Kadhim 85' | | Malek 90+1' (pen.) | Stadium: Al Karkh Stadium; Referee: Yousef Saeed |

| 30 September 2018 3 | Al-Mina'a | 1 – 2 | Al-Bahri | Basra |
| 14:45 GMT | Junuzović 73' | | Ibrahim 41' (pen.); Terry 78' | Stadium: Basra Sports City; Referee: Mohanad Qasim |

| 6 October 2018 4 | Naft Al-Wasat | 0 – 1 | Al-Mina'a | Karbala |
| 12:30 GMT | | | Malek 28' | Stadium: Karbalaa International Stadium; Referee: Ali Sabah |

| 20 October 2018 5 | Al-Mina'a | 2 – 1 | Al-Zawra'a | Basra |
| 14:00 GMT | Jawad 65'; Mahdi 90+3' | | Abbas 42' | Stadium: Basra Sports City; Referee: Mohammed Salman |

| 4 November 2018 6 | Al-Naft | 4 – 2 | Al-Mina'a | Baghdad |
| 11:30 GMT | Dawood 30', 57', 64'; Shaker 48'; Sadoun (red card) 53' | | Malek (red card) 53'; Junuzović 55'; Jassim 90+3' | Stadium: Al-Sinaa Stadium; Referee: Haitham Mohammed Ali |

| 9 November 2018 7 | Al-Mina'a | 0 – 0 | Al-Talaba | Basra |
| 11:30 GMT | | | | Stadium: Basra Sports City; Referee: Wathek Mohammed |

| 22 November 2018 8 | Al-Mina'a | 1 – 0 | Naft Al-Janoob | Basra |
| 11:30 GMT | Junuzović 45+2' | | | Stadium: Basra Sports City; Referee: Mohammed Salman |

| 28 November 2018 9 | Al-Sinaat Al-Kahrabaiya | 0 – 0 | Al-Mina'a | Baghdad |
| 11:00 GMT | | | | Stadium: Al Taji Stadium; Referee: Mohanad Qasim |

| 3 December 2018 10 | Al-Mina'a | 1 – 2 | Al-Kahraba | Basra |
| 13:15 GMT | Junuzović 13' | | Raad 33'; Mohammed 35' | Stadium: Basra Sports City; Referee: Mustafa Abdul Karim |

| 9 December 2018 11 | Naft Maysan | 2 – 1 | Al-Mina'a | Amarah |
| 11:30 GMT | Saeed 45'; Saadoun 77' | | Mohsen 72' | Stadium: Al-Maimouna Stadium; Referee: Rawad Yassin |

| 12 December 2018 12 | Al-Mina'a | 1 – 1 | Al-Quwa Al-Jawiya | Basra |
| 11:30 GMT | Jawad 64' | | Mendy 26' | Stadium: Basra Sports City; Referee: Ali Sabah |

| 18 December 2018 13 | Al-Hussein | 1 – 0 | Al-Mina'a | Baghdad |
| 11:30 GMT | Karim 53' | | | Stadium: Five Thousand Stadium; Referee: Haitham Mohammed Ali |

| 30 January 2019 14 | Al-Mina'a | 0 – 0 | Al-Diwaniya | Basra |
| 11:30 GMT | | | | Stadium: Basra Sports City; Referee: Ahmed Majid |

| 5 February 2019 15 | Erbil | 1 – 0 | Al-Mina'a | Erbil |
| 11:30 GMT | Sherzad 79' | | | Stadium: Franso Hariri Stadium; Referee: Salam Juma |

| 10 February 2019 16 | Al-Mina'a | 2 – 0 | Al-Hedood | Basra |
| 11:30 GMT | Malek 45+1'; Shokan 85'; Talla (red card) 89' | | Obaid (red card) 43' | Stadium: Basra Sports City; Referee: Ali Sabah |

| 16 February 2019 17 | Al-Shorta | 3 – 0 | Al-Mina'a | Baghdad |
| 15:00 GMT | Jassim 19'; Abdul-Zahra 38', 62' | | | Stadium: Al-Shaab Stadium; Referee: Mohammed Salman |

| 21 February 2019 18 | Amanat Baghdad | 2 – 1 | Al-Mina'a | Baghdad |
| 11:30 GMT | Karim 4'; Hussein 13' | | Hadi 1'; Falah (red card) 45+1' | Stadium: Amanat Baghdad Stadium; Referee: Yousif Saeed |

| 27 February 2019 19 | Al-Mina'a | 0 – 0 | Al-Najaf | Basra |
| 11:30 GMT | | | | Stadium: Basra Sports City; Referee: Wathik Mohammed |

| 29 March 2019 20 | Al-Mina'a | 3 – 0 | Al-Samawa | Basra |
| 12:00 GMT | Shokan 6', 19', 85' | | | Stadium: Basra Sports City; Referee: Saif Khamis |

| 6 April 2019 21 | Al-Mina'a | 1 – 1 | Al-Karkh | Basra |
| 15:00 GMT | Shokan 17' | | Saad 65' | Stadium: Basra Sports City; Referee: Ahmed Kadhim |

| 12 April 2019 22 | Al-Bahri | 2 – 2 | Al-Mina'a | Basra |
| 12:30 GMT | Hadi 5'; Shawqi 84' | | Hatem 27'; Shokan 90' | Stadium: Basra Sports City; Referee: Salem Amer |

| 17 April 2019 23 | Al-Mina'a | 0 – 0 | Naft Al-Wasat | Basra |
| 13:45 GMT | | | | Stadium: Basra Sports City; Referee: Wathik Mohammed |

| 27 April 2019 24 | Al-Zawra'a | 1 – 0 | Al-Mina'a | Baghdad |
| 12:00 GMT | Jwayed 41' (pen.) | | Shokan (red card) 90' | Stadium: Al-Shaab Stadium; Referee: Ali Sabah |

| 3 May 2019 25 | Al-Mina'a | 0 – 0 | Al-Naft | Basra |
| 13:45 GMT | | | | Stadium: Basra Sports City; Referee: Mohanad Qasim |

| 9 May 2019 26 | Al-Talaba | 2 – 1 | Al-Mina'a | Baghdad |
| 12:00 GMT | Jodah 31'; Hussein 90+5' (pen.); Rahim (red card) 90+8' | | Mahdi 77' | Stadium: Al-Shaab Stadium; Referee: Haitham Mohammed Ali |

| 15 May 2019 27 | Naft Al-Junoob | 1 – 2 | Al-Mina'a | Basra |
| 13:45 GMT | Ali 83' | | Jassim 68'; Shokan 76' | Stadium: Basra Sports City; Referee: Zaid Thamir |

| 20 May 2019 28 | Al-Mina'a | 2 – 2 | Al-Sinaat Al-Kahrabaiya | Basra |
| 13:45 GMT | Adnan 31' (red card) 85'; Shokan 40' | | Mahmoud 72' (pen.), 80'; Abdul-Abbas (red card) 90+4' | Stadium: Basra Sports City; Referee: Mustafa Abdul Karim |

| 26 May 2019 29 | Al-Kahraba | 1 – 1 | Al-Mina'a | Baghdad |
| 13:30 GMT | Ashour 12' | | Shokan 55' | Stadium: Al Taji Stadium; Referee: Mohanad Qasim |

| 1 June 2019 30 | Al-Mina'a | 1 – 1 | Naft Maysan | Basra |
| 19:00 GMT | Shokan 69' (pen.) | | Saadoun 90+3' | Stadium: Basra Sports City |

| 15 June 2019 31 | Al-Quwa Al-Jawiya | 1 – 1 | Al-Mina'a | Baghdad |
| 14:00 GMT | Mahdi 80' (o.g.) | | Malek 49' (pen.), (red card) 89' | Stadium: Al-Shaab Stadium; Referee: Zaid Thamer |

| 19 June 2019 32 | Al-Mina'a | 3 – 2 | Al-Hussein | Basra |
| 16:15 GMT | Shokan 37', 90+3'; Jassim 52' | | Flayeh 29', 42' | Stadium: Basra Sports City; Referee: Mohanad Qasim |

| 24 June 2019 33 | Al-Diwaniya | 1 – 0 | Al-Mina'a | Diwaniya |
| 14:00 GMT | Abdul-Razzak 25' | | | Stadium: Al-Diwaniya Stadium; Referee: Dhiyaa Jandeel |

| 30 June 2019 34 | Al-Mina'a | 0 – 0 | Erbil | Basra |
| 16:15 GMT | | | | Stadium: Basra Sports City; Referee: Tahseen Ali |

| 7 July 2019 35 | Al-Hedood | 2 – 1 | Al-Mina'a | Baghdad |
| 14:00 GMT | Saeed 6'; Adel 70' | | Shokan 55' | Stadium: Al Taji Stadium |

| 14 July 2019 36 | Al-Mina'a | 1 – 0 | Al-Shorta | Basra |
| 16:15 GMT | Abdul-Wahed 24' | | | Stadium: Basra Sports City; Referee: Wathik Mohammed |

| 19 July 2019 37 | Al-Mina'a | 1 – 1 | Amanat Baghdad | Basra |
| 16:15 GMT | Shokan 38' | | Salam 3' | Stadium: Basra Sports City |

| 22 July 2019 38 | Al-Najaf | 3 – 0 | Al-Mina'a | Najaf |
| 14:00 GMT | Rzayej 6'; Eduwo 67'; Kadhim 80' | | | Stadium: Al-Najaf Stadium; Referee: Montassar Ghazi |

== Iraq FA Cup ==
=== Round of 32 ===
| 12 October 2018 First leg | Amanat Baghdad | 3 – 2 | Al-Mina'a | Baghdad |
| 12:00 GMT | Mallakh 6'; Ibrahim 49'; Qasim 53' | Report | Jassim 19'; Rubat 90+1' | Stadium: Local administration stadium Referee: Iyyad Zahem |

| 16 November 2018 Second leg | Al-Mina'a | 1 – 3 | Amanat Baghdad | Basra |
| 12:00 GMT | Obradović (red card) 36'; Junuzović 81' (pen.) | | Qasim 14'; Mohammed 77'; Jabbar 85' | Stadium: Basra Sports City; Referee: Feed Karim |

== Statistics ==
=== Squad information ===
As of 22 July 2019

| No. | Pos | Nat | Player | Total | | Iraqi Premier League | | Iraq FA Cup | |
| No. | Pos | Nat | Player | Apps | Goals | Apps | Goals | Apps | Goals |
|---|---|---|---|---|---|---|---|---|---|
| 1 | GK | (Iraq) IRQ | Hussam Mahdi | 3 | 0 | 3 | 0 | 0 | 0 |
| 2 | DF | (Iraq) IRQ | Abbas Badie | 18 | 0 | 17 | 0 | 1 | 0 |
| 3 | DF | (Iraq) IRQ | Ali Qasim | 6 | 0 | 6 | 0 | 0 | 0 |
| 4 | MF | (Iraq) IRQ | Alaa Jawad | 30 | 2 | 29 | 2 | 1 | 0 |
| 5 | MF | (Iraq) IRQ | Sadeq Sami | 29 | 0 | 27 | 0 | 2 | 0 |
| 6 | MF | (Cameroon) CMR | Didier Talla | 29 | 0 | 28 | 0 | 1 | 0 |
| 7 | MF | (Iraq) IRQ | Hussein Abdul Wahed | 36 | 1 | 34 | 1 | 2 | 0 |
| 8 | MF | (Iraq) IRQ | Ahmed Farhan | 32 | 0 | 30 | 0 | 2 | 0 |
| 9 | FW | (Iraq) IRQ | Sultan Jassim | 27 | 4 | 25 | 3 | 2 | 1 |
| 10 | MF | (Iraq) IRQ | Hussam Malik | 33 | 4 | 32 | 4 | 1 | 0 |
| 11 | DF | (Iraq) IRQ | Aqeel Mahdi | 26 | 2 | 24 | 2 | 2 | 0 |
| 12 | FW | (Iraq) IRQ | Mohammed Hatem | 11 | 1 | 11 | 1 | 0 | 0 |
| 15 | DF | (Iraq) IRQ | Hussein Falah | 37 | 0 | 35 | 0 | 2 | 0 |
| 17 | DF | (Iraq) IRQ | Haidar Sari | 15 | 0 | 14 | 0 | 1 | 0 |
| 19 | FW | (Iraq) IRQ | Ahmed Zamel | 18 | 0 | 16 | 0 | 2 | 0 |
| 20 | GK | (Iraq) IRQ | Karrar Ibrahim | 13 | 0 | 13 | 0 | 0 | 0 |
| 22 | GK | (Iraq) IRQ | Yassin Karim | 26 | 0 | 24 | 0 | 2 | 0 |
| 23 | DF | (Iraq) IRQ | Mohammed Jabbar Rubat | 25 | 1 | 23 | 0 | 2 | 1 |
| 25 | MF | (Iraq) IRQ | Omar Jabbar | 24 | 0 | 24 | 0 | 0 | 0 |
| 30 | MF | (Iraq) IRQ | Hamza Talib | 2 | 0 | 2 | 0 | 0 | 0 |
| 33 | DF | (Ghana) GHA | Nuru Sulley | 15 | 0 | 15 | 0 | 0 | 0 |
| 35 | DF | (Iraq) IRQ | Abdullah Mohsin | 22 | 1 | 20 | 1 | 2 | 0 |
| 40 | GK | (Iraq) IRQ | Hameed Battal | 0 | 0 | 0 | 0 | 0 | 0 |
| 53 | DF | (Iraq) IRQ | Hamza Adnan | 23 | 1 | 23 | 1 | 0 | 0 |
| 77 | MF | (Iraq) IRQ | Mustafa Hadi Ahmed | 18 | 1 | 18 | 1 | 0 | 0 |
| 99 | FW | (Iraq) IRQ | Mohammed Jabbar Shokan | 18 | 14 | 18 | 14 | 0 | 0 |
Players sold but featured this season
| 14 | MF | (Iraq) IRQ | Ali Majed | 4 | 0 | 3 | 0 | 1 | 0 |
| 18 | MF | (Iraq) IRQ | Hussein Mohammed | 3 | 0 | 3 | 0 | 0 | 0 |
| 24 | MF | (Iraq) IRQ | Jawad Kadhim | 2 | 0 | 2 | 0 | 0 | 0 |
| 26 | DF | (Iraq) IRQ | Ali Mohammed Kanoosh | 4 | 0 | 3 | 0 | 1 | 0 |
| 28 | FW | (Croatia) CRO | Edin Junuzović | 16 | 5 | 15 | 4 | 1 | 1 |
| 29 | DF | (Serbia) SRB | Goran Obradović | 10 | 0 | 9 | 0 | 1 | 0 |
| 32 | DF | (Iraq) IRQ | Jassim Mohammed | 4 | 0 | 3 | 0 | 1 | 0 |
| 33 | MF | (Iraq) IRQ | Haider Ali | 4 | 0 | 4 | 0 | 0 | 0 |

=== Goalscorers ===
| Rank | Pos. | Nationality | No. | Name | Iraqi Premier League | Iraq FA Cup | Total |
|---|---|---|---|---|---|---|---|
| 1 | FW | (Iraq) | 99 | Mohammed Jabbar Shokan | 14 | 0 | 14 |
| 2 | FW | (Croatia) | 28 | Edin Junuzović | 4 | 1 | 5 |
| 3 | MF | (Iraq) | 10 | Hussam Malik | 4 | 0 | 4 |
| 3 | FW | (Iraq) | 9 | Sultan Jassim | 3 | 1 | 4 |
| 4 | MF | (Iraq) | 4 | Alaa Jawad | 2 | 0 | 2 |
| 4 | DF | (Iraq) | 11 | Aqeel Mahdi | 2 | 0 | 2 |
| 5 | FW | (Iraq) | 12 | Mohammed Hatem | 1 | 0 | 1 |
| 5 | MF | (Iraq) | 77 | Mustafa Hadi Ahmed | 1 | 0 | 1 |
| 5 | MF | (Iraq) | 7 | Hussein Abdul Wahed | 1 | 0 | 1 |
| 5 | DF | (Iraq) | 35 | Abdullah Mohsin | 1 | 0 | 1 |
| 5 | DF | (Iraq) | 53 | Hamza Adnan | 1 | 0 | 1 |
| 5 | DF | (Iraq) | 23 | Mohammed Jabbar Rubat | 0 | 1 | 1 |
| Own goals | | | | | 0 | 0 | 0 |
| TOTALS | | | | | 34 | 3 | 37 |

Last updated: 22 July 2019

=== Clean sheets ===
| Rank | Nationality | Number | Name | Iraqi Premier League | Iraq FA Cup | Total |
|---|---|---|---|---|---|---|
| 1 | (Iraq) | 22 | Yassin Karim | 8 | 0 | 8 |
| 2 | (Iraq) | 20 | Karrar Ibrahim | 5 | 0 | 5 |
| 3 | (Iraq) | 1 | Hussam Mahdi | 0 | 0 | 0 |
| TOTALS | | | | 13 | 0 | 13 |

Last updated: 22 July 2019

=== Penalties ===
| Date | Name | Opponent | Result |
|---|---|---|---|
| 24 September 2018 | (Iraq) Hussam Malik | Al-Karkh | Yes |
| 16 November 2018 | (Croatia) Edin Junuzović | Amanat Baghdad | Yes |
| 1 June 2019 | (Iraq) Mohammed Jabbar Shokan | Naft Maysan | Yes |
| 15 June 2019 | (Iraq) Hussam Malik | Al-Quwa Al-Jawiya | Yes |

=== Overall statistics ===
| | League | Cup | Total Stats |
|---|---|---|---|
| Games played | 38 | 2 | 40 |
| Games won | 8 | 0 | 8 |
| Games drawn | 16 | 0 | 16 |
| Games lost | 14 | 2 | 16 |
| Goals scored | 34 | 3 | 37 |
| Goals conceded | 42 | 6 | 48 |
| Goal difference | -8 | -3 | -11 |
| Clean sheets | 13 | 0 | 13 |
| Goal by substitute | 5 | 0 | 5 |

Last updated: 22 July 2019
