= 2017–18 Al-Mina'a SC season =

Al-Mina'a SC 2022-23 football season

Al-Mina'a SC
2017–18 season
- Chairman: Jalil Hanoon
- Manager: Fajr Ibrahim (until 21 January); Nadhum Shaker (from 27 January until 22 May); Ahmed Rahim (from 29 May until 16 June); Mahmoud Yasser (from 18 June)
- Ground: Basra Sports City (temporary use)
- Premier League: 15th
- FA Cup: Round of 32
- Top goalscorer: Mustafa Karim (8) goals
Home colours	Away colours	Third colours

The 2017–18 season will be Al-Minaa's 42nd season in the Iraqi Premier League, having featured in all 44 editions of the competition except two. Al-Minaa are participating in the Iraqi Premier League and the Iraq FA Cup.

They enter this season having finished in a disappointing sixth place in the league in the 2016–17 season, and will be looking to wrestle back the title they won in the 1977–78 season.

== Squad ==
Note: Flags indicate national team as defined under FIFA eligibility rules; some limited exceptions apply. Players may hold more than one non-FIFA nationality.

No.	Pos.	Nation	Player
1	GK	IRQ	Hussam Mahdi
3	DF	IRQ	Hamza Adnan
4	MF	IRQ	Osama Ali
5	MF	IRQ	Ahmed Mohsin Ashour
6	MF	CMR	Didier Talla
8	MF	IRQ	Ali Hosni
9	MF	IRQ	Mohammed Jaffal
10	FW	CRO	Edin Junuzović
11	MF	IRQ	Ahmed Jalil Hanoon
12	FW	EGY	Ahmed Yasser (on loan from Al-Masry)
13	MF	IRQ	Ahmed Farhan
14	MF	IRQ	Hussam Malik
15	DF	IRQ	Hussein Falah

No.	Pos.	Nation	Player
17	DF	IRQ	Haidar Sari
20	GK	IRQ	Saqr Ajail
21	DF	IRQ	Herdi Siamand
22	GK	IRQ	Yassin Karim
23	DF	IRQ	Mohammed Jabbar Rubat (captain)
24	DF	IRQ	Abbas Badie
25	MF	IRQ	Omar Jabbar
26	DF	IRQ	Ammar Kadhim
30	MF	IRQ	Hamza Talib
32	GK	IRQ	Hameed Battal
35	DF	IRQ	Abdullah Mohsin
42	FW	IRQ	Mustafa Karim

== Players data ==
As of 12 June 2018

No.	Name	Nationality	Position(s)	Date of birth (age)	Signed from	Since	Games	Goals
Goalkeepers
1	Hussam Mahdi	(Iraq)	GK	6 January 1997 (age 29)	Youth system	October 2017	0	0
20	Saqr Ajail	(Iraq)	GK	3 January 1993 (age 33)	Amanat Baghdad	October 2017	18	0
22	Yassin Karim	(Iraq)	GK	21 October 1990 (age 35)	Al-Sulaymaniyah	August 2016	41	0
30	Hameed Battal	(Iraq)	GK	13 November 1998 (age 27)	Youth system	September 2015	0	0
Defenders
3	Hamza Adnan	(Iraq)	LB	8 February 1996 (age 30)	Youth system	September 2012	126	2
15	Hussein Falah	(Iraq)	RB	1 July 1994 (age 32)	Duhok	February 2014	87	0
17	Haidar Sari	(Iraq)	LB	17 August 1997 (age 29)	Youth system	September 2012	57	1
21	Herdi Siamand	(Iraq)	CB	13 January 1985 (age 41)	Erbil	June 2016	60	1
23	Mohammed Jabbar Rubat	(Iraq)	RB/LB	29 June 1993 (age 33)	Youth system	September 2009	130	11
24	Abbas Badie	(Iraq)	CB	9 January 2000 (age 26)	Youth system	July 2016	1	0
26	Ammar Kadhim	(Iraq)	CB	2 December 1993 (age 32)	Al-Quwa Al-Jawiya	September 2017	21	0
35	Abdullah Mohsin	(Iraq)	CB	27 May 1994 (age 32)	Youth system	September 2012	80	1
Midfielders
4	Osama Ali	(Iraq)	DM	25 June 1988 (age 38)	Al-Quwa Al-Jawiya	September 2017	22	0
5	Ahmed Mohsin Ashour	(Iraq)	CM/RW	4 January 1996 (age 30)	Youth system	September 2012	92	7
6	Didier Talla	(Cameroon)	DM	8 March 1989 (age 37)	Al-Merrikh	February 2018	16	1
8	Ali Hosni	(Iraq)	LW/RW	23 May 1994 (age 32)	Youth system	September 2012	100	19
9	Mohammed Jaffal	(Iraq)	CAM/RW	1 June 1996 (age 30)	Al-Quwa Al-Jawiya	September 2017	25	3
11	Ahmed Jalil Hanoon	(Iraq)	LW/RW	16 November 1991 (age 34)	Youth system	September 2011	17	0
13	Ahmed Farhan	(Iraq)	CAM	3 August 2000 (age 26)	Youth system	October 2017	5	0
14	Hussam Malik	(Iraq)	CAM/LW/RW	1 January 1995 (age 31)	Naft Al-Janoob	June 2016	58	11
25	Omar Jabbar	(Iraq)	DM	5 May 1993 (age 33)	Al-Talaba	September 2017	26	1
Forwards
10	Edin Junuzović	(Croatia)	ST	28 April 1986 (age 40)	Rudar Velenje	April 2018	6	4
12	Ahmed Yasser	(Egypt)	ST/CF/SS/RW	27 November 1991 (age 34)	Al-Masry	January 2017	31	5
42	Mustafa Karim	(Iraq)	ST	21 July 1987 (age 39)	Al-Talaba	January 2018	13	8

== Transfers ==
=== In ===
#	Position	Player	Transferred from	Fee	Date	Source
12	FW	(Egypt) Ahmed Yasser	(Egypt) Al-Masry	Loan return	8 September 2017	
7	MF	(Iraq) Salih Sadir	(Iraq) Naft Al-Wasat	Free transfer	9 September 2017	
9	MF	(Iraq) Mohammed Jaffal	(Iraq) Al-Quwa Al-Jawiya	Free transfer	13 September 2017	
24	FW	(Iraq) Arkan Ammar	(Iraq) Al-Karkh	Free transfer	20 September 2017	
4	MF	(Iraq) Osama Ali	(Iraq) Al-Quwa Al-Jawiya	Free transfer	21 September 2017	
8	MF	(Iraq) Ali Hosni	(Kuwait) Al-Arabi	End of loan	21 September 2017	
10	FW	(Iraq) Bassim Ali	(Iraq) Naft Al-Janoob	Free transfer	22 September 2017	
25	MF	(Iraq) Omar Jabbar	(Iraq) Al-Shorta	Free transfer	28 September 2017	
26	DF	(Iraq) Ammar Kadhim	(Iraq) Al-Quwa Al-Jawiya	Free transfer	28 September 2017	
1	GK	(Iraq) Hussam Mahdi	Youth system	n/a	9 October 2017	
13	MF	(Iraq) Ahmed Farhan	Youth system	n/a	9 October 2017	
20	GK	(Iraq) Saqr Ajail	(Iraq) Amanat Baghdad	Free transfer	16 October 2017	
32	DF	(Iraq) Karrar Amer	(Iraq) Al-Najaf	Loan	1 November 2017	
42	FW	(Iraq) Mustafa Karim	(Iraq) Al-Talaba	Free transfer	31 January 2018	
6	MF	(Cameroon) Didier Talla	(Sudan) Al-Merrikh	Free transfer	2 February 2018	
10	FW	(Croatia) Edin Junuzović	(Slovenia) Rudar Velenje	Free transfer	13 March 2018	

=== Out ===
#	Position	Player	Transferred to	Fee	Date	Source
10	FW	(Iraq) Mohammed Jabbar Shokan	(Jordan) Al-Ramtha	Free transfer	12 August 2017	
19	MF	(Ghana) Akwetey Mensah	(Iraq) Al-Shorta	Free transfer	31 August 2017	
24	MF	(Iraq) Ahmed Mohsin Jaber	(Iraq) Al-Naft	Free transfer	12 September 2017	
7	MF	(Iraq) Hussein Abdul Wahed	(Iraq) Al-Talaba	Free transfer	13 September 2017	
20	GK	(Iraq) Karrar Ibrahim	Released	n/a	14 September 2017	
9	MF	(Iraq) Ammar Abdul Hussein	(Iraq) Al-Shorta	Free transfer	16 September 2017	
4	MF	(Iraq) Yasser Ammar	(Iraq) Zakho	Free transfer	16 September 2017	
16	DF	(Iraq) Nadeem Karim	(Iraq) Al-Talaba	Free transfer	17 September 2017	
14	MF	(Iraq) Ali Qasim	(Iraq) Naft Maysan	Free transfer	23 September 2017	
18	FW	(Iraq) Hussam Ibrahim	(Iraq) Al-Bahri	Free transfer	14 October 2017	
40	DF	(Iraq) Mustafa Nadhim	(Iraq) Al-Najaf	Free transfer	15 October 2017	
11	MF	(Iraq) Hussein Husni	(Iraq) Al-Sinaa	Free transfer	6 November 2017	
28	MF	(Iraq) Ibrahim Kamil	(Iraq) Al-Hedood	Free transfer	20 November 2017	
7	MF	(Iraq) Salih Sadir	(Iraq) Al-Quwa Al-Jawiya	Free transfer	1 February 2018	
24	FW	(Iraq) Arkan Ammar	(Iraq) Al-Talaba	Free transfer	1 February 2018	
2	DF	(Iraq) Karrar Amer	(Iraq) Al-Najaf	End of loan	5 February 2018	
10	FW	(Iraq) Bassim Ali	(Iraq) Naft Al-Janoob	Free transfer	6 February 2018	

== Technical staff ==
Position	Name
Coach	(Iraq) Mahmoud Yasser
Goalkeeping coach	(Iraq) Amer Abdul Wahab
Fitness coach	(Tunisia) Hicham Ghazia
Administrative director	(Iraq) Mohammed Nasser Shakroun
Club doctor	(Iraq) Faris Abdullah

Updated to match played 3 June 2018
Source: Al-Minaa SC: Transfers and News

== Board members ==
President	(Iraq) Jalil Hanoon
Secretary	(Iraq) Mohammad Jaber Hassan
Treasurer	(Iraq) Ibrahim Hussein Abed-Ali
Board of Directors Member	(Iraq) Naji Abdullah Al-Mosawi
Board of Directors Member	(Iraq) Nazar Taha Humoud
Board of Directors Member	(Iraq) Nabeel Abdul Ameer Jamil
Board of Directors Member	(Iraq) Ali Fadhel Hassan
Board of Directors Member	(Iraq) Karim Jassim Hassan
Female Board Member	(Iraq) Ikhlass Naji Jassim

Updated to match played 18 April 2018
Source: Al-Minaa Club: Sailors of south

== Club ==
=== Kits ===
Supplier: Jako / Sponsor: GCPI

Home	Away	Third

== Stadium ==
During the previous season, the stadium of Al-Mina'a was demolished. A company will build a new stadium that will be completed in 2019. Since they can't play their games at Al Mina'a Stadium, they will be playing at Basra Sports City during this season.

== Pre-season ==
Win Draw Loss

19 October 2017 Friendly	Al-Minaa	3 – 1	Al-Bahri	Basra, Iraq
13:00 GMT	Ammar 66'; Malik 90' (pen.); Jaffal 90+3'		Abdul Hassan 81' (pen.)	Stadium: Basra Sports City

3 November 2017 Friendly	Al-Minaa	3 – 2	Naft Maysan	Basra, Iraq
12:00 GMT	Jaffal 21'; Yasser 25'; Bassim 55'		Homoud 58'; Rahim 61'	Stadium: Basra Sports City

7 November 2017 Friendly	Stir Zarzouna (Tunisia)	0 – 2	Al-Minaa	Sousse, Tunisia
13:30 GMT			Sadir 23'; Osama 69'	Stadium: El Mouradi Club Kantaoui

9 November 2017 Friendly	Kalaa Sport (Tunisia)	2 – 0	Al-Minaa	Sousse, Tunisia
13:30 GMT	Obaid 21'; Bashar 65'			Stadium: Kalaa Sghira Stadium

11 November 2017 Friendly	Ben Guerdane (Tunisia)	2 – 1	Al-Minaa	Sousse, Tunisia
10:30 GMT	Radawi 55'; Coulibaly 64' (pen.)		Bassim 61'	Stadium: El Mouradi Club Kantaoui; Referee: Rushdi Quzquz

== Iraqi Premier League ==
=== Summary table ===
Overall								Home						Away					
Pld	W	D	L	GF	GA	GD	Pts	W	D	L	GF	GA	GD	W	D	L	GF	GA	GD
38	8	17	13	34	38	−4	41	5	9	5	18	14	+4	3	8	8	16	24	−8

Last updated: 17 July 2018.
Source: Goalzz.com

=== Matches ===
Win Draw Loss

21 November 2017 1	Al-Mina'a	0 – 0	Al-Quwa Al-Jawiya	Basra
13:30 GMT			Saeed (yellow card) 70'; Ali (yellow card) 75'; Hameed (yellow card) 78'	Stadium: Basra Sports City; Referee: Wathik Mohammed

25 November 2017 2	Al-Kahraba	2 – 2	Al-Mina'a	Baghdad
11:30 GMT	Hameed 50' (pen.); Athab 84'; Karim (red card) 85'		Jaffal 42'; Siamand 47'	Stadium: Al-Taji Stadium; Referee: Yousuf Saeed

29 November 2017 3	Karbalaa	0 – 1	Al-Mina'a	Karbalaa
13:30 GMT			Sadir 78' (pen.)	Stadium: Karbala Sports City

4 December 2017 4	Al-Mina'a	1 – 0	Al-Bahri	Basra
14:00 GMT	Sadir 9' (pen.)			Stadium: Basra Sports City; Referee: Mohanad Qasim

8 December 2017 5	Al-Diwaniya	3 – 1	Al-Mina'a	Diwaniya
13:30 GMT	Hatem 28', 75'; Mohsen 90+6' (pen.)		Bassim 80' (pen.); Siamand (red card) 90+5'	Stadium: Efach Stadium; Referee: Ali Sabah

12 December 2017 6	Al-Mina'a	1 – 1	Zakho	Basra
13:30 GMT	Bassim 22'		Imbo 56'	Stadium: Basra Sports City; Referee: Sabah Abed

7 January 2018 7	Al-Hedood	0 – 0	Al-Mina'a	Baghdad
13:30 GMT				Stadium: Baghdad Stadium

11 January 2018 8	Al-Mina'a	0 – 0	Al-Hussein	Basra
12:45 GMT				Stadium: Basra Sports City

15 January 2018 9	Al-Mina'a	0 – 0	Al-Shorta	Basra
13:45 GMT				Stadium: Basra Sports City

19 January 2018 10	Naft Al-Wasat	1 – 1	Al-Mina'a	Najaf
15:30 GMT	Qasim 24'		Malek 26'; Sadir (penalty missed) 84'	Stadium: An-Najaf Stadium

24 January 2018 11	Al-Mina'a	0 – 1	Naft Al-Janoob	Basra
19:00 GMT			Musa 36'	Stadium: Basra Sports City

29 January 2018 12	Al-Mina'a	1 – 2	Al-Zawra'a	Basra
14:00 GMT	Jabbar 47'		Salah 67'; Jawda 81'; Mean (red card) 90+4'	Stadium: Basra Sports City

3 February 2018 13	Al-Najaf	3 – 0	Al-Mina'a	Najaf
13:45 GMT	Shakor 12'; Ayyad 48'; Karim 80' (pen.)			Stadium: An-Najaf Stadium

9 February 2018 14	Al-Talaba	3 – 1	Al-Mina'a	Baghdad
13:45 GMT	Khalid 16'; Ammar 62'; Afful 73'		Karim 2'; Adnan (red card) 83'	Stadium: Al-Shaab Stadium

15 February 2018 15	Al-Mina'a	1 – 0	Al-Samawa	Basra
13:00 GMT	Karim (penalty missed) 52'; Malek 55'			Stadium: Basra Sports City

20 February 2018 16	Amanat Baghdad	1 – 3	Al-Mina'a	Baghdad
11:30 GMT	Abdul-Mohsen 54'		Ashour 25'; Karim 31', 59'	Stadium: Baghdad Stadium

14 March 2018 17	Al-Sinaat Al-Kahrabaiya	1 – 2	Al-Mina'a	Baghdad
11:30 GMT	Tuma 6'		Jaffal 30'; Hosni 75'	Stadium: Al-Sinaa Stadium

31 March 2018 18	Al-Quwa Al-Jawiya	1 – 1	Al-Mina'a	Baghdad
16:00 GMT	Ahmad 11'; Maan (yellow card) 31'; Sadir (yellow card) 83'		Malek 9'; Jabbar (yellow card) 50'; Ajail (yellow card) 90+4'	Stadium: Al-Shaab Stadium; Referee: Mohanad Qasim

4 April 2018 19	Al-Mina'a	0 – 0	Al-Kahraba	Basra
12:00 GMT				Stadium: Basra Sports City

13 April 2018 20	Al-Mina'a	4 – 1	Karbalaa	Basra
15:00 GMT	Talla 44'; Hosni 49'; Karim 59', 63'		Qabel 57' (pen.)	Stadium: Basra Sports City; Referee: Mohammad Tariq

21 April 2018 21	Al-Bahri	1 – 1	Al-Mina'a	Basra
13:00 GMT	Hadi 43'		Jaffal 21'	Stadium: Az-Zubayr Stadium; Referee: Haitham Mohammed Ali

25 April 2018 22	Al-Mina'a	2 – 1	Naft Maysan	Basra
12:30 GMT	Junuzović 26', 62'		Saeed 25'	Stadium: Basra Sports City; Referee: Wathik Mohammed

29 April 2018 23	Al-Mina'a	4 – 2	Al-Diwaniya	Basra
17:00 GMT	Ashour 22'; Karim 23', 33' (pen.), 60' (pen.); Adnan (red card) 90+1'		Hatem 88'; Sahib 89'	Stadium: Basra Sports City; Referee: Amjad Subhi

3 May 2018 24	Zakho	1 – 1	Al-Mina'a	Zakho
16:00 GMT	Salam 60'		Junuzović 12'	Stadium: Zakho International Stadium

15 May 2018 25	Al-Naft	0 – 0	Al-Mina'a	Baghdad
13:30 GMT				Stadium: Al-Sinaa Stadium; Referee: Haitham Mohammed Ali

19 May 2018 26	Al-Mina'a	1 – 1	Al-Hedood	Basra
19:00 GMT	Junuzović 30'		90+5'	Stadium: Basra Sports City; Referee: Sabah Abed

23 May 2018 27	Al-Hussein	3 – 0	Al-Mina'a	Baghdad
13:30 GMT				Stadium: Al-Taji Stadium
Note: Al-Hussein were awarded a 3–0 victory after Al-Minaa did not turn up for the match.

5 June 2018 28	Al Shorta	3 – 0	Al-Mina'a	Baghdad
12:00 GMT				Stadium: Al-Shaab Stadium
Note: Al-Shorta were awarded a 3–0 victory after Al-Minaa did not turn up for the match.

3 June 2018 29	Al-Mina'a	0 – 0	Naft Al-Wasat	Basra
19:00 GMT				Stadium: Basra Sports City; Referee: Mohanad Qasim

8 June 2018 30	Naft Al-Janoob	1 – 1	Al-Mina'a	Basra
13:30 GMT	Ali 36'		Malek 17'	Stadium: Basra Sports City

12 June 2018 31	Al-Zawra'a	1 – 0	Al-Mina'a	Baghdad
19:00 GMT	Sabah 66'			Stadium: Al-Shaab Stadium; Referee: Ali Sabah

18 June 2018 32	Al-Mina'a	0 – 0	Al-Najaf	Basra
13:45 GMT				Stadium: Basra Sports City

22 June 2018 33	Al-Mina'a	1 – 1	Al-Talaba	Basra
13:45 GMT	Farhan 89' (pen.)		Salah 35'	Stadium: Basra Sports City

27 June 2018 34	Al-Samawa	2 – 1	Al-Mina'a	Samawa
13:45 GMT	Subhi 17' (pen.); Adnan 50'		Shawqi 19'	Stadium: As Samawah Stadium

3 July 2018 35	Al-Mina'a	1 – 2	Amanat Baghdad	Basra
13:45 GMT	Farhan 40'		Mallakh 15'; Mohammed 50'	Stadium: Basra Sports City

9 July 2018 36	Naft Maysan	3 – 0	Al-Mina'a	Amarah
13:45 GMT	Ali 22'; Sadoun 31'; Hunayhen 82' (pen.)			Stadium: Maysan Olympic Stadium

13 July 2018 37	Al-Mina'a	0 – 3 (w/o)	Al-Naft	Basra
16:00 GMT				Stadium: Basra Sports City

17 July 2018 38	Al-Mina'a	1 – 2	Al-Sinaat Al-Kahrabaiya	Basra
13:45 GMT	Lateef 15'		Majed 20'; Taha 50'	Stadium: Basra Sports City

== Statistics ==
=== Squad information ===
As of 12 June 2018

No.	Pos	Nat	Player	Total		Iraqi Premier League		Iraq FA Cup	
No.	Pos	Nat	Player	Apps	Goals	Apps	Goals	Apps	Goals
3	DF	(Iraq) IRQ	Hamza Adnan	25	0	25	0	0	0
4	MF	(Iraq) IRQ	Osama Ali	22	0	22	0	0	0
5	MF	(Iraq) IRQ	Ahmed Mohsin Ashour	27	2	27	2	0	0
6	MF	(Cameroon) CMR	Didier Talla	16	1	16	1	0	0
8	MF	(Iraq) IRQ	Ali Hosni	15	2	15	2	0	0
9	MF	(Iraq) IRQ	Mohammed Jaffal	25	3	25	3	0	0
10	FW	(Croatia) CRO	Edin Junuzović	6	4	6	4	0	0
11	MF	(Iraq) IRQ	Ahmed Jalil Hanoon	7	0	7	0	0	0
12	FW	(Egypt) EGY	Ahmed Yasser	17	0	17	0	0	0
13	MF	(Iraq) IRQ	Ahmed Farhan	5	0	5	0	0	0
14	MF	(Iraq) IRQ	Hussam Malik	26	4	26	4	0	0
15	DF	(Iraq) IRQ	Hussein Falah	23	0	23	0	0	0
17	DF	(Iraq) IRQ	Haidar Sari	11	0	11	0	0	0
20	GK	(Iraq) IRQ	Saqr Ajail	13	0	13	0	0	0
21	DF	(Iraq) IRQ	Herdi Siamand	26	1	26	1	0	0
22	GK	(Iraq) IRQ	Yassin Karim	16	0	16	0	0	0
23	DF	(Iraq) IRQ	Mohammed Jabbar Rubat	22	0	22	0	0	0
24	DF	(Iraq) IRQ	Abbas Badie	1	0	1	0	0	0
25	MF	(Iraq) IRQ	Omar Jabbar	26	1	26	1	0	0
26	DF	(Iraq) IRQ	Ammar Kadhim	21	0	21	0	0	0
35	DF	(Iraq) IRQ	Abdullah Mohsin	15	0	15	0	0	0
42	FW	(Iraq) IRQ	Mustafa Karim	13	8	13	8	0	0
Players sold but featured this season
2	DF	(Iraq) IRQ	Karrar Amer	10	0	10	0	0	0
7	MF	(Iraq) IRQ	Salih Sadir	12	2	12	2	0	0
10	MF	(Iraq) IRQ	Bassim Ali	12	2	12	2	0	0
24	FW	(Iraq) IRQ	Arkan Ammar	7	0	7	0	0	0

=== Goalscorers ===
Rank	Pos.	Nationality	No.	Name	Iraqi Premier League	Iraq FA Cup	Total
1	FW	(Iraq)	42	Mustafa Karim	8	0	8
2	FW	(Croatia)	10	Edin Junuzović	4	0	4
2	MF	(Iraq)	14	Hussam Malik	4	0	4
3	MF	(Iraq)	9	Mohammed Jaffal	3	0	3
4	MF	(Iraq)	5	Ahmed Mohsin Ashour	2	0	2
4	MF	(Iraq)	8	Ali Hosni	2	0	2
4	MF	(Iraq)	13	Ahmed Farhan	2	0	2
4	FW	(Iraq)	10	Bassim Ali	2	0	2
4	MF	(Iraq)	7	Salih Sadir	2	0	2
5	MF	(Iraq)	25	Omar Jabbar	1	0	1
5	MF	(Cameroon)	6	Didier Talla	1	0	1
5	DF	(Iraq)	21	Herdi Siamand	1	0	1
5	MF	(Iraq)		Ali Shawqi	1	0	1
5	MF	(Iraq)		Karrar Lateef	1	0	1
Own goals					0	0	0
TOTALS					34	0	34

Last updated: 17 July 2018

=== Clean sheets ===
Rank	Nationality	Number	Name	Iraqi Premier League	Iraq FA Cup	Total
1	(Iraq)	22	Yassin Karim	6	0	6
2	(Iraq)	20	Saqr Ajail	4	0	4
3	(Iraq)	1	Hussam Mahdi	1	0	1
TOTALS				11	0	11

Last updated: 17 July 2018

=== Overall statistics ===
	League	Cup	Total Stats
Games played	38	0	38
Games won	8	0	8
Games drawn	17	0	17
Games lost	13	0	13
Goals scored	34	0	34
Goals conceded	38	0	38
Goal difference	-4	+0	-4
Clean sheets	11	0	11
Goal by substitute	2	0	2

Last updated: 17 July 2018

== Sources ==
- FIFA.COM
- Iraqi League 2017/2018
- Al-Minaa SC: Transfers and News
