= 2019–20 Al-Mina'a SC season =

Al-Mina'a SC
2019–20 season
- Chairman: Hadi Ahmed (until 4 September); Mohammed Jaber Hassan (from 3 November)
- Manager: Valeriu Tița
- Ground: Basra Sports City
- Premier League: Abandoned
- FA Cup: Round of 32
- Top goalscorer: League: Hamza Adnan, Sheka Fofanah; Hussam Malik (2 goals); All: Hamza Adnan, Sheka Fofanah; Hussam Malik (2 goals)
Home colours	Away colours

The 2019–20 season will be Al-Minaa's 44th season in the Iraqi Premier League, having featured in all 46 editions of the competition except two. Al-Minaa are participating in the Iraqi Premier League and the Iraq FA Cup.

They enter this season having finished in a disappointing 17th place in the league in the 2018–19 season, and will be looking to wrestle back the title they won in the 1977–78 season.

The season started on 18 September 2019 in a double round-robin format, but was postponed after 23 October 2019 due to the 2019 Iraqi protests with matches from the first four rounds having been played, Al-Minaa ranked first in the ranking table during these four rounds.

On 25 January 2020, after the withdrawal of five of the 20 teams that started the season, the Iraq Football Association (IFA) decided to annul the results of all the matches that had been played so far and to cancel relegation for the season. The league will be restarted on 16 February 2020 as a single round-robin tournament.

Matches from the first five rounds of the restarted season were played, but the season was postponed after 10 March 2020 due to the COVID-19 pandemic, and it was officially cancelled on 3 June 2020.

== Squad ==
Note: Flags indicate national team as defined under FIFA eligibility rules; some limited exceptions apply. Players may hold more than one non-FIFA nationality.

No.	Pos.	Nation	Player
1	GK	IRQ	Hussam Mahdi
2	DF	IRQ	Abbas Badie
3	DF	IRQ	Hamza Adnan (vice-captain)
5	MF	IRQ	Ahmed Mohsin Ashour
7	MF	IRQ	Hussein Younis
8	MF	IRQ	Ahmed Farhan
9	MF	IRQ	Sadeq Sami
10	MF	IRQ	Hussam Malik (captain)
11	DF	IRQ	Aqeel Mahdi
12	GK	IRQ	Yassin Karim
14	MF	IRQ	Sajid Abbas Hashim
15	DF	IRQ	Hussein Falah
17	MF	IRQ	Eissa Adel

No.	Pos.	Nation	Player
18	DF	LBN	Kassem El Zein
19	MF	IRQ	Ahmed Zamel
20	GK	IRQ	Mujtaba Mohammed
23	DF	IRQ	Ahmed Yahya
24	DF	IRQ	Ali Qasim
26	FW	IRQ	Salem Ahmed
28	MF	NIG	Abdoul Madjid Moumouni
32	FW	GHA	Stephen Sarfo
33	MF	IRQ	Abbas Yas
35	DF	IRQ	Ahmed Khalid
55	MF	IRQ	Saif Jassim
99	FW	MTN	Ely Cheikh Voulany

== Transfers ==
=== In ===
Date	Pos.	Name	From	Fee	Ref.
2 August 2019	RB	(Iraq) Firas Finjan	(Iraq) Al-Karkh	Free transfer	
3 August 2019	RW	(Iraq) Hussein Younis	(Iraq) Al-Samawa	Free transfer	
5 August 2019	CF	(Nigeria) Kenneth Ikechukwu	(Northern Cyprus) Yenicami Ağdelen	Free transfer	
6 August 2019	DM	(Niger) Abdoul Madjid Moumouni	(Sudan) Al-Merrikh	Free transfer	
10 August 2019	CM	(Iraq) Ahmed Mohsin Ashour	(Iraq) Al-Zawraa	Free transfer	
20 August 2019	CB	(Iraq) Ahmed Khalid	(Iraq) Erbil	Free transfer	
20 August 2019	DM	(Iraq) Saif Jassim	(Iraq) Al-Hudood	Free transfer	
30 August 2019	GK	(Iraq) Hassanain Mohammed	(Iraq) Al-Kahrabaa	Free transfer	
30 August 2019	GK	(Iraq) Mujtaba Mohammed	Youth system	n/a	
30 August 2019	DM	(Iraq) Abbas Yas	Youth system	n/a	
5 September 2019	CB	(Iran) Vafa Hakhamaneshi	(Iran) Sanat Naft Abadan	Free transfer	
5 September 2019	LB	(Iraq) Ali Ahmed Radhi	(Iraq) Al-Talaba	Free transfer	
13 September 2019	CF	(Sierra Leone) Sheka Fofanah	(Oman) Al-Nasr	Free transfer	
17 September 2019	DM	(Iraq) Eissa Adel	Youth system	n/a	
18 September 2019	CM	(Iraq) Hassan Ali Flayeh	(Iraq) Al-Hussein	Free transfer	
1 February 2020	CB	(Lebanon) Kassem El Zein	(Lebanon) Nejmeh	Loan	
3 February 2020	CF	(Iraq) Salem Ahmed	Youth system	n/a	
3 February 2020	CM	(Iraq) Sajid Abbas Hashim	Youth system	n/a	
3 February 2020	LB	(Iraq) Ahmed Yahya	(Iraq) Masafi Al-Janoob	Free transfer	
9 February 2020	CF	(Ghana) Stephen Sarfo	(Lebanon) Bourj	Free transfer	
19 February 2020	CF	(Mauritania) Ely Cheikh Voulany	(Mauritania) Nouadhibou	Free transfer	

=== Out ===
Date	Pos.	Name	To	Fee	Ref.
23 July 2019	CF	(Iraq) Sultan Jassim	Released	n/a	
23 July 2019	CF	(Iraq) Mohammed Hatem	Released	n/a	
23 July 2019	DM	(Iraq) Hamza Talib	Released	n/a	
23 July 2019	GK	(Iraq) Hameed Battal	Released	n/a	
5 August 2019	LB	(Iraq) Haidar Sari	(Iraq) Naft Al-Janoob	Free transfer	
5 August 2019	LW	(Iraq) Mustafa Hadi Ahmed	(Iraq) Naft Al-Janoob	Free transfer	
8 August 2019	CM	(Iraq) Omar Jabbar	(Iraq) Al-Sinaat Al-Kahrabaiya	Free transfer	
9 August 2019	AM	(Iraq) Hussein Abdul Wahed	(Iraq) Erbil	Free transfer	
18 August 2019	CB	(Iraq) Abdullah Mohsin	(Iraq) Naft Al-Janoob	Free transfer	
24 August 2019	RB	(Iraq) Mohammed Jabbar Rubat	(Iraq) Naft Al-Janoob	Free transfer	
25 August 2019	DM	(Cameroon) Didier Talla	(Iraq) Al-Najaf	Free transfer	
9 September 2019	CF	(Iraq) Mohammed Jabbar Shokan	(Iraq) Naft Al-Wasat	Free transfer	
22 September 2019	CB	(Ghana) Nuru Sulley	(Iraq) Naft Al-Janoob	Free transfer	
15 October 2019	DM	(Iraq) Alaa Jawad	(Iraq) Al-Talaba	Free transfer	
15 October 2019	GK	(Iraq) Karrar Ibrahim	(Iraq) Al-Talaba	Free transfer	
23 January 2020	CF	(Nigeria) Kenneth Ikechukwu	(Northern Cyprus) Göçmenköy	Free transfer	
24 January 2020	CB	(Iran) Vafa Hakhamaneshi	(Iran) Zob Ahan	Free transfer	
28 January 2020	RB	(Iraq) Firas Finjan	(Iraq) Al-Talaba	Free transfer	
31 January 2020	CF	(Sierra Leone) Sheka Fofanah	(Saudi Arabia) Al-Jandal	Free transfer	
1 February 2020	GK	(Iraq) Hassanain Mohammed	Released	n/a	
1 February 2020	LB	(Iraq) Ali Ahmed Radhi	Released	n/a	
1 February 2020	CM	(Iraq) Hassan Ali Flayeh	Released	n/a	

== Personnel ==
=== Technical staff ===
Position	Name	Nationality
Manager:	Valeriu Tița	(Romania)
Assistant manager:	Ammar Rihawi	(Syria)
Goalkeeping coach:	Saddam Salman	(Iraq)
Fitness coach:	Florin Drǎghici	(Romania)
Administrative director:	Jihad Madlool	(Iraq)
Club doctor:	Sebastian Baltateanu	(Romania)

Updated to match played 3 July 2019
Source: fanarnews.org

=== Board members ===
Position	Name	Nationality
President:	Mohammad Jaber Al-Jaberi	(Iraq)
Secretary:	Taher Balas	(Iraq)
Treasurer:	Ali Kadhim Mubarak	(Iraq)
Member of the Board:	Nazar Taha Humoud	(Iraq)
Member of the Board:	Jihad Madlool Obaid	(Iraq)
Member of the Board:	Ahmed Hamed Al-Jaberi	(Iraq)
Member of the Board:	Nabeel Abdul Ameer Jamil	(Iraq)

Updated to match played 8 December 2018
Source: Alsumaria.tv

== Club ==
=== Kits ===
Supplier: Nike / Sponsor: GCPI

Home	Away

== Stadium ==
During the previous season, the stadium of Al-Mina'a was demolished. A company will build a new stadium that will be completed in 2021. Since they can't play their games at Al Mina'a Stadium, they will be playing at Basra Sports City during this season.

== Friendlies ==
27 August 2019	Al-Mina'a	0 – 0	Naft Al-Janoob	Basra
15:30 GMT				Stadium: Basra Sports City

5 September 2019	Al-Mina'a	1 – 1	Al-Samawa	Basra
14:30 GMT	Ikechukwu 30'		Qasim 50' (pen.)	Stadium: Basra Sports City

8 September 2019	Al-Mina'a	1 – 1	Naft Maysan	Basra
15:00 GMT	Jassim 78'		Humood 25'	Stadium: Basra Sports City

11 September 2019	Al-Karkh	1 – 1	Al-Mina'a	Baghdad
13:00 GMT	Khalil 18'		Ikechukwu 37'	Stadium: Al Karkh Stadium

14 September 2019	Al-Mina'a	2 – 0	Al-Noor	Basra
14:00 GMT	Ikechukwu 23'; Farhan 37'			Stadium: Basra Sports City

22 September 2019	Al-Mina'a	1 – 0	Naft Al-Janoob	Basra
14:00 GMT	Mahdi 75'			Stadium: Basra Sports City

15 October 2019	Al-Mina'a	3 – 0	Al-Bahri	Basra
14:30 GMT	Malek 7'; Adnan 12'; Habib 61'			Stadium: Basra Sports City

3 November 2019	Al-Mina'a	2 – 1	Masafi Al-Janoob	Basra
13:00 GMT	Fofanah 53'; Jassim 90' (pen.)		Saad 22'	Stadium: Basra Sports City

12 December 2019	Al-Mina'a	6 – 0	Al-Noor	Basra
14:00 GMT	Adnan 12'; Farhan 26'; Abo Kraysha 32', 41'; Sami 61'; Mahdi 78'			Stadium: Basra Sports City

2 February 2020	Al-Mina'a	4 – 0	Al-Noor	Basra
14:00 GMT				Stadium: Basra Sports City

6 February 2020	Al-Mina'a	0 – 0	Al-Bahri	Basra
14:30 GMT				Stadium: Basra Sports City

10 February 2020	Al-Mina'a	2 – 0	Al-Shabab Al-Basry	Basra
14:30 GMT	Farhan 26'; Adnan 56'			Stadium: Basra Sports City

1 March 2020	Al-Mina'a	5 – 0	Safwan	Basra
14:30 GMT	Voulany 13', 26', 42'; Mohsin 56', 78'			Stadium: Basra Sports City

== Competitions ==
=== Premier League ===
==== League table ====
Pos	Team	Pld	W	D	L	GF	GA	GD	Pts
1	Al-Minaa	4	2	2	0	6	3	+3	8
2	Al-Quwa Al-Jawiya	3	2	1	0	3	0	+3	7
3	Al-Naft	4	2	1	1	5	3	+2	7
4	Al-Sinaat Al-Kahrabaiya	3	2	0	1	7	4	+3	6
5	Naft Al-Wasat	2	2	0	0	5	2	+3	6

Source: Kooora
Rules for classification: 1) points; 2) goal difference; 3) number of goals scored.

Pos	Team	Pld	W	D	L	GF	GA	GD	Pts
5	Al-Zawraa	3	2	1	0	2	0	+2	7
6	Al-Talaba	5	2	1	2	7	6	+1	7
7	Al-Minaa	4	2	1	1	3	3	0	7
8	Al-Hudood	4	2	0	2	4	3	+1	6
9	Erbil	5	2	0	3	5	6	−1	6

Source: Kooora
Rules for classification: 1) points; 2) goal difference; 3) number of goals scored.

==== Summary table ====
Overall								Home						Away					
Pld	W	D	L	GF	GA	GD	Pts	W	D	L	GF	GA	GD	W	D	L	GF	GA	GD
8	4	3	1	9	6	+3	15	3	0	1	5	3	+2	1	3	0	4	3	+1

Last updated: 7 March 2020.
Source: Goalzz.com

==== Matches ====
19 September 2019 1	Al-Mina'a	1 – 0	Zakho	Basra
16:15 GMT	Jassim (yellow card) 14'; Khalid (yellow card) 57' (goal) 75'; Zamel (yellow card) 62'; Karim (yellow card) 90+4'	Report	Salman (yellow card) 12'; Jamal (yellow card) 89'	Stadium: Basra Sports City; Referee: Amjad Subhi
Note: This result was annulled after the competition was restarted with a new format.

29 September 2019 2	Al-Quwa Al-Jawiya	0 – 0	Al-Mina'a	Baghdad
14:00 GMT	Saeed (yellow card) 9'; Hussein (yellow card) 43'	Report	Zamel (yellow card) 12'; Moumouni (yellow card) 18'; Radhi (yellow card) 45'; Khalid (yellow card) 86'	Stadium: Al-Shaab Stadium; Referee: Zaid Thamer
Note: This result was annulled after the competition was restarted with a new format.

4 October 2019 3	Al-Mina'a	3 – 1	Al-Hedood	Basra
16:00 GMT	Malek 31' (pen.); Adnan 46', 58'; Badie (yellow card) 59'; Jassim (yellow card) 70'; Moumouni (yellow card) 90+2'		Abbas (yellow card) 28'; Jarallah 87'	Stadium: Basra Sports City; Referee: Khalid Karim
Note: This result was annulled after the competition was restarted with a new format.

22 October 2019 4	Al-Zawra'a	2 – 2	Al-Mina'a	Baghdad
14:15 GMT	Abdul-Raheem 33'; Abbas 36'	Report	Hakhamaneshi (yellow card) 5'; Fofanah 42', 89'; Zamel (yellow card) 48'; Malek (yellow card) 67'; Moumouni (yellow card) 90+2'	Stadium: Al-Shaab Stadium; Referee: Yousif Saeed
Note: This result was annulled after the competition was restarted with a new format.

==== Restarted season ====
17 February 2020 1	Al-Mina'a	1 – 0	Naft Al-Janoob	Basra
13:30 GMT	Moumouni (yellow card) 31' (yellow-red card) 83'; Badie 49'; Adnan (yellow card) 53'	Report	Zamel (yellow card) 43' (yellow-red card) 83'; Jallawi (yellow card) 45+1'; Rubat (yellow card) 90+3'	Stadium: Basra Sports City; Referee: Khalid Karim

22 February 2020 2	Naft Al-Wasat	0 – 1	Al-Mina'a	Karbala
13:30 GMT	Karim (yellow card) 45+1'; Ali (yellow card) 59'	Report	Badie (yellow card) 26'; Khaled (yellow card) 45'; Malek 72'; Sarfo (yellow card) 90+3'	Stadium: Karbalaa Stadium; Referee: Mohammed Salman

27 February 2020 3	Al-Mina'a	0 – 2	Al-Naft	Basra
11:30 GMT	Moumouni (yellow card) 23'; Zamel (yellow card) 54'; Sarfo (red card) 77'; Falah (yellow card) 90'	Report	Karim (yellow card) 17'; Rahim (yellow card) 23'; Dawood 28', 74'; Abdul-Ridha (yellow card) 60'	Stadium: Basra Sports City; Referee: Mohanad Qasim

7 March 2020 4	Al-Shorta	1 – 1	Al-Mina'a	Baghdad
13:30 GMT	K.Jassim (yellow card) 39'; Abdul-Amir 75'; Natiq (yellow card) 77'; Mhawi (yellow card) 85'	Report	S.Jassim (yellow card) 67'; Moumouni 69'	Stadium: Al-Shaab Stadium; Referee: Ali Sabah

=== FA Cup ===
9 October 2019 Third round	Al-Samawa	0 – 0 (7–6 p)	Al-Mina'a	Samawa
13:00 GMT				Stadium: As Samawah Stadium

== Squad statistics ==
=== Appearances and goals ===
As of 7 March 2020

No.	Pos	Nat	Player	Total		Premier League		FA Cup	
No.	Pos	Nat	Player	Apps	Goals	Apps	Goals	Apps	Goals
Goalkeepers
1	GK	(Iraq) IRQ	Hussam Mahdi	0	0	0	0	0	0
12	GK	(Iraq) IRQ	Yassin Karim	9	0	8	0	1	0
20	GK	(Iraq) IRQ	Mujtaba Mohammed	0	0	0	0	0	0
Defenders
2	DF	(Iraq) IRQ	Abbas Badie	8	1	8	1	0	0
3	DF	(Iraq) IRQ	Hamza Adnan	9	2	8	2	1	0
11	DF	(Iraq) IRQ	Aqeel Mahdi	0	0	0	0	0	0
15	DF	(Iraq) IRQ	Hussein Falah	9	0	8	0	1	0
18	DF	(Lebanon) LBN	Kassem El Zein	4	0	4	0	0	0
23	DF	(Iraq) IRQ	Ahmed Yahya	1	0	1	0	0	0
24	DF	(Iraq) IRQ	Ali Qasim	1	0	0	0	1	0
35	DF	(Iraq) IRQ	Ahmed Khalid	6	1	5	1	1	0
Midfielders
5	MF	(Iraq) IRQ	Ahmed Mohsin Ashour	5	0	4	0	1	0
7	MF	(Iraq) IRQ	Hussein Younis	8	0	7	0	1	0
8	MF	(Iraq) IRQ	Ahmed Farhan	5	0	5	0	0	0
9	MF	(Iraq) IRQ	Sadeq Sami	5	0	5	0	0	0
10	MF	(Iraq) IRQ	Hussam Malik	8	2	7	2	1	0
14	MF	(Iraq) IRQ	Sajid Abbas	0	0	0	0	0	0
17	MF	(Iraq) IRQ	Eissa Adel	0	0	0	0	0	0
19	MF	(Iraq) IRQ	Ahmed Zamel	7	0	7	0	0	0
28	MF	(Niger) NIG	Abdoul Madjid Moumouni	8	1	7	1	1	0
33	MF	(Iraq) IRQ	Abbas Yas	2	0	2	0	0	0
55	MF	(Iraq) IRQ	Saif Jassim	9	0	8	0	1	0
Forwards
26	FW	(Iraq) IRQ	Salem Ahmed	2	0	2	0	0	0
32	FW	(Ghana) GHA	Stephen Sarfo	3	0	3	0	0	0
99	FW	(Mauritania) MTN	Ely Cheikh Voulany	1	0	1	0	0	0
Players sold but featured this season
6	DF	(Iran) IRN	Vafa Hakhamaneshi	1	0	1	0	0	0
14	MF	(Iraq) IRQ	Hassan Ali Flayeh	2	0	1	0	1	0
18	FW	(Sierra Leone) SLE	Sheka Fofanah	4	2	3	2	1	0
23	DF	(Iraq) IRQ	Ali Ahmed Radhi	4	0	3	0	1	0
26	DF	(Iraq) IRQ	Firas Finjan	3	0	2	0	1	0
32	FW	(Nigeria) NGA	Kenneth Ikechukwu	5	0	4	0	1	0

=== Goalscorers ===
Rank	Pos.	Nationality	No.	Name	Premier League	FA Cup	Total
1	FW	(Sierra Leone)	18	Sheka Fofanah	2	0	2
1	DF	(Iraq)	3	Hamza Adnan	2	0	2
1	MF	(Iraq)	10	Hussam Malik	2	0	2
2	DF	(Iraq)	35	Ahmed Khalid	1	0	1
2	DF	(Iraq)	2	Abbas Badie	1	0	1
2	MF	(Niger)	28	Abdoul Madjid Moumouni	1	0	1
Own goals					0	0	0
TOTALS					9	0	9

Last updated: 7 March 2020

=== Assists ===
Rank	Pos.	Nationality	No.	Name	Premier League	FA Cup	Total
1	DF	(Iraq)	3	Hamza Adnan	4	0	4
2	MF	(Iraq)	10	Hussam Malik	2	0	2
3	FW	(Ghana)	32	Stephen Sarfo	1	0	1
3	FW	(Sierra Leone)	18	Sheka Fofanah	1	0	1
3	MF	(Iraq)	5	Sadeq Sami	1	0	1
TOTALS					9	0	9

Last updated: 7 March 2020

=== Penalties ===
Date	Name	Opponent	Result
4 October 2019	(Iraq) Hussam Malik	Al-Hedood	Yes

=== Disciplinary record ===
Rank	Position	Name	Premier League		FA Cup		Total	
Rank	Position	Name	Booked	Sent off (straight red)	Booked	Sent off (straight red)	Booked	Sent off (straight red)
1	MF	(Niger) Abdoul Madjid Moumouni	4	1	0	0	4	1
2	FW	(Ghana) Stephen Sarfo	1	1	0	0	1	1
3	MF	(Iraq) Ahmed Zamel	4	0	0	0	4	0
3	DF	(Iraq) Ahmed Khalid	3	0	1	0	4	0
4	MF	(Iraq) Saif Jassim	3	0	0	0	3	0
5	DF	(Iraq) Abbas Badie	2	0	0	0	2	0
6	DF	(Iraq) Hamza Adnan	1	0	0	0	1	0
6	DF	(Iraq) Hussein Falah	1	0	0	0	1	0
6	GK	(Iraq) Yassin Karim	1	0	0	0	1	0
6	DF	(Iraq) Ali Ahmed Radhi	1	0	0	0	1	0
6	DF	(Iran) Vafa Hakhamaneshi	1	0	0	0	1	0
6	MF	(Iraq) Hussam Malik	1	0	0	0	1	0
Total			23	2	1	0	24	2

Last updated: 7 March 2020

=== Clean sheets ===
Rank	Nationality	Number	Name	Premier League	FA Cup	Total
1	(Iraq)	12	Yassin Karim	4	1	5
TOTALS				4	1	5

Last updated: 22 February 2020

== Overall statistics ==
	League	Cup	Total Stats
Games played	8	1	9
Games won	4	0	4
Games drawn	3	1	4
Games lost	1	0	1
Goals scored	9	0	9
Goals conceded	6	0	6
Goal difference	+3	0	+3
Clean sheets	4	1	5
Goal by substitute	1	0	1

Last updated: 7 March 2020
