= Taşkınköy =

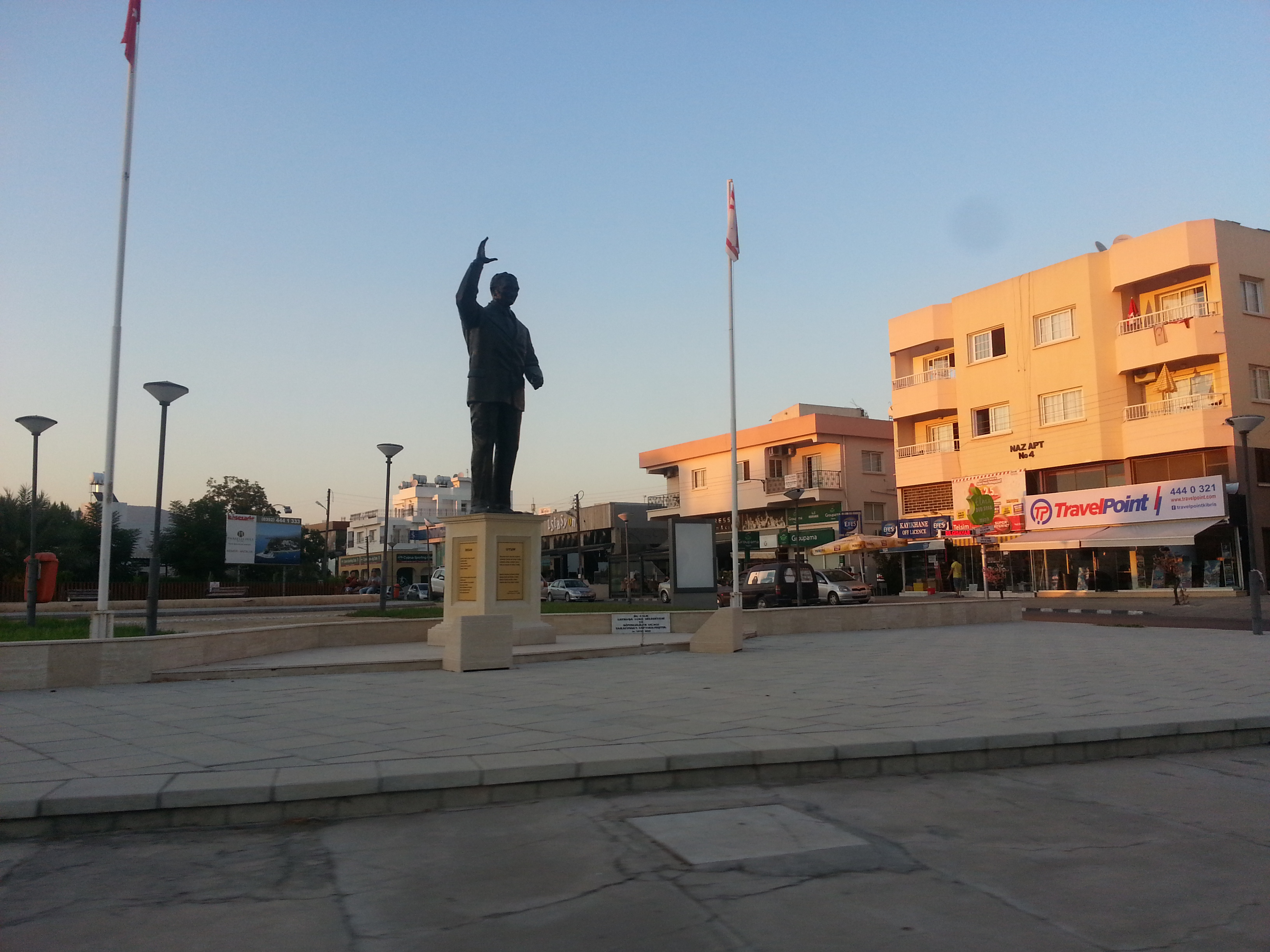
- A statue of Turkish Prime Minister Bülent Ecevit at a Y-junction between Taşkınköy and Göçmenköy

- Location within Cyprus
- Coordinates: 35°12′26″N 33°20′45″E
- Country: Cyprus
  - District: Nicosia District
- Country (controlled by): Northern Cyprus
  - District: Lefkoşa District
  - Municipality: Nicosia Turkish Municipality

Population (2011)
  - Total: 3,847

Taşkınköy is a quarter of North Nicosia in Northern Cyprus. As of 2011, it had a population of 3,847.

The first settlement in the area was after the 1974 conflict, as houses were built by a labor union, Türk-Sen. The area was named "Taşkınköy" after Necati Taşkın, the chairman of the labor union who was killed in a crash while the construction was still underway.

Today, the area hosts a vibrant shopping street, with occasional shopping festivals.
