= Mohammed Salam =

Sudanese footballer (born 1990)

Personal information
- Full name: Mohammed Salam Rahama Aamir
- Date of birth: 30 December 1990 (age 35)
- Place of birth: Sudan
- Height: 1.78 m (5 ft 10 in)
- Position: Defender

Senior career*
Years	Team	Apps	(Gls)
2007–2009	Al-Markhiya		
2009–2023	Al Kharaitiyat	201	(1)
- * Club domestic league appearances and goals as of 31/12/11

Mohammed Salam is a Sudanese football player who plays as a defender. He plays as a defender and he wears the number 14.
