= Sheka Fofanah =

Sierra Leonean footballer

Personal information
- Full name: Sheka Sorie Fofanah
- Date of birth: 2 January 1998 (age 28)
- Place of birth: Koidu, Sierra Leone
- Height: 1.83 m (6 ft 0 in)
- Position: Forward

Team information
- Current team: Diyala
- Number: 9

Youth career
- 2017: Jablonec

Senior career*
Years	Team	Apps	(Gls)
–2016	Freetown City	?	(?)
2016	Vejle Boldklub	0	(0)
2017	Jablonec II	0	(0)
2017	Frýdek-Místek	2	(0)
2018	Al-Merrikh	?	(5)
2018	Al-Nasr	?	(4)
2019–2020	Al-Mina'a	3	(2)
2020	Al Jandal	4	(1)
2020–2021	Naft Al-Wasat	5	(??)
2021–2022	Duhok		
2022-	Diyala		

International career
2016–	Sierra Leone	5	(2)
- * Club domestic league appearances and goals as of 22 October 2019

Sheka Sorie Fofanah (born 2 January 1998) is a Sierra Leonean international footballer who plays as a forward for Diyala and the Sierra Leone national team.

== Club career ==
Having started his career with Sierra Leone National Premier League side Freetown City, Fofanah signed for Danish 1st Division side Vejle Boldklub in 2016, after trialing with Swedish champions IFK Norrköping. He made his debut in a 3–1 Danish Cup victory against Tjæreborg IF.

He signed for Czech First League side Jablonec in 2017, joining up with the junior team. However, he signed for Czech second division side Frýdek-Místek only months later.

== International career ==
Fofanah made his international debut in a 1–1 draw with Malawi. He scored his first goal in his second game, a 2–1 defeat to Gabon. His second goal came against Sudan, in a 1–0 victory in 2017 Africa Cup of Nations qualification.

== Career statistics ==
=== Club ===
As of 20 October 2017.

Club	Season	League			Cup		Continental		Other		Total	
Club	Season	Division	Apps	Goals	Apps	Goals	Apps	Goals	Apps	Goals	Apps	Goals
Vejle Boldklub	2016–17	Danish 1st Division	0	0	1 (Note: Appearances in the Danish Cup)	0	–		0	0	1	0
Jablonec	2016–17	Czech First League	0	0	0	0	–		0	0	0	0
Frýdek-Místek	2017–18	Czech National Football League	2	0	0	0	–		0	0	2	0
Career total			2	0	1	0	–		0	0	3	0

=== International ===
As of match played 20 April 2017.

National team	Year	Apps	Goals
Sierra Leone	2016	5	2
Sierra Leone	2017	0	0
Total		5	2

=== International goals ===
Scores and results list Sierra Leone's goal tally first.

No	Date	Venue	Opponent	Score	Result	Competition
1.	25 March 2016	Stade de Franceville, Franceville, Gabon	Gabon	1–2	1–2	Friendly
2.	4 June 2016	National Stadium, Freetown, Sierra Leone	Sudan	1–0	1–0	2017 Africa Cup of Nations qualification
