= Göçmenköy =

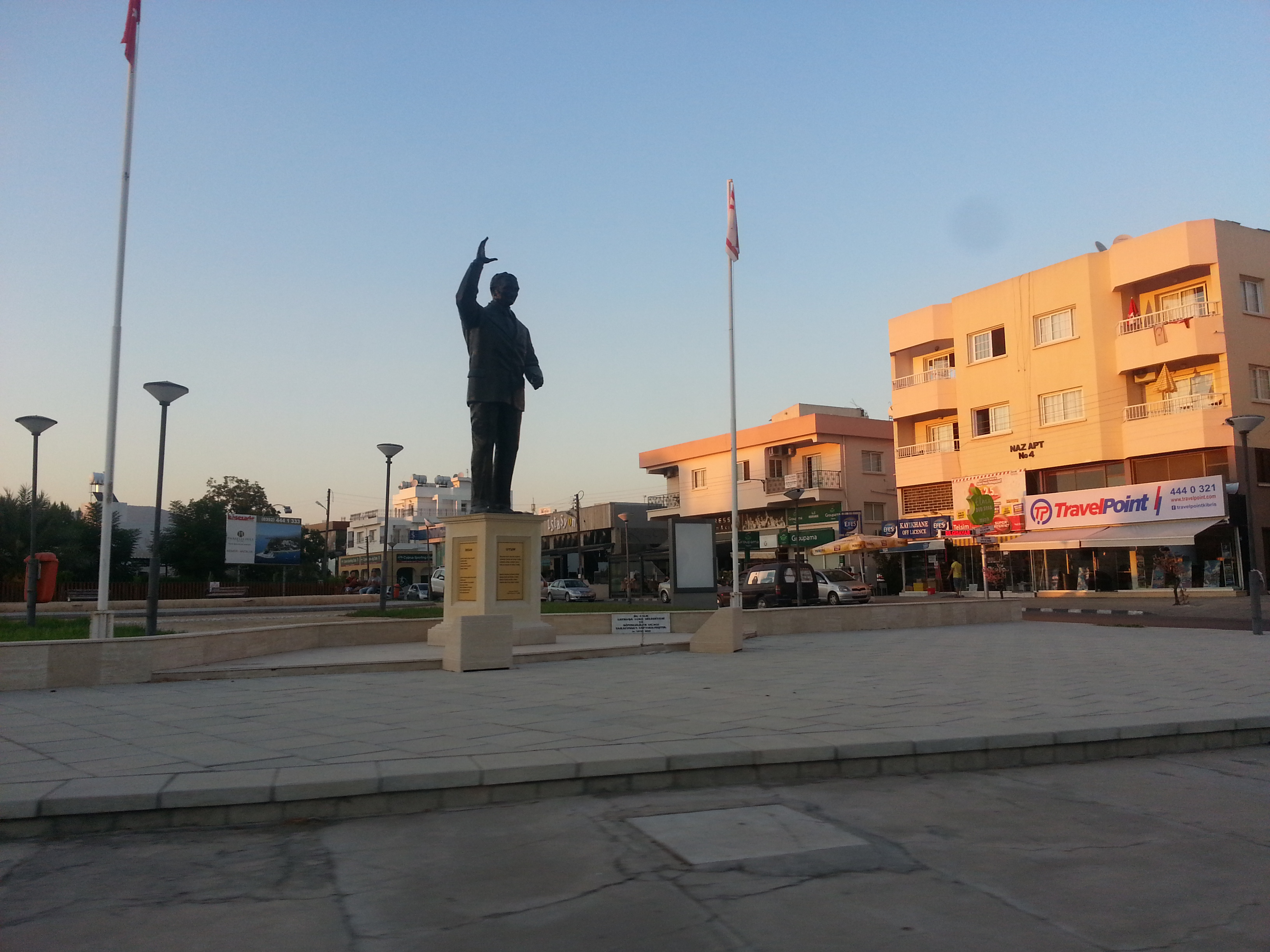
- A statue of Turkish Prime Minister Bülent Ecevit at a Y-junction between Göçmenköy and Taşkınköy

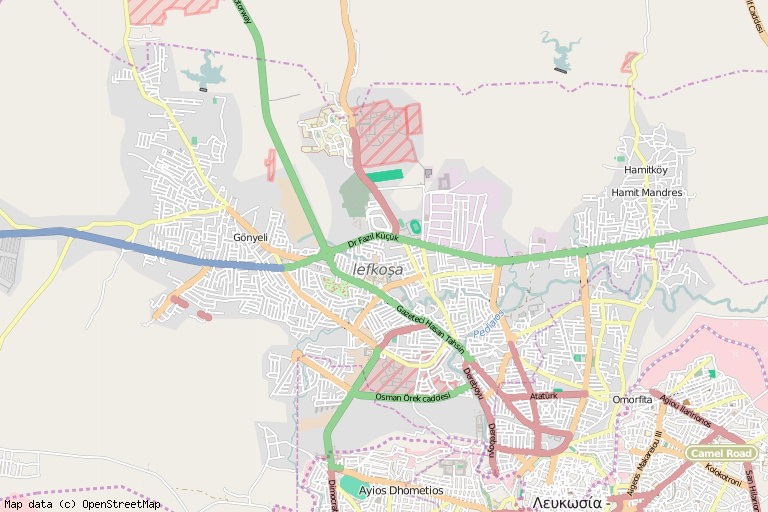
- Location of a point from Göçmenköy in North Nicosia
- Coordinates: 35°12′33″N 33°20′04″E
- Country: Cyprus
  - District: Nicosia District
- Country (controlled by): Northern Cyprus
  - District: Lefkoşa District
  - Municipality: Nicosia Turkish Municipality

Government
  - Muhtar: Ayşe Başaranel

Population (2011)
  - Total: 3,003

Göçmenköy (Turkish for "village of the displaced") is a quarter of North Nicosia in Northern Cyprus. As of 2011, it had a population of 3,003. It was founded in 1966 as a settlement for the Turkish Cypriots displaced by the intercommunal violence. The formerly rural area became heavily urbanized in the 1960s and 70s. Göçmenköy became a vibrant part of North Nicosia, and is home to the Atatürk Sports Complex, which is home to the Nicosia Atatürk Stadium, the largest stadium in Northern Cyprus. It co-hosts an annual international festival.

== History ==
Before the Cyprus crisis of 1963–64, the location of the quarter was mainly agricultural area, with only a detergent factory and a Turkish garrison. In 1966, in response to the overcrowding of the walled city due to the displacement of Turkish Cypriots from areas of Nicosia attacked by Greek Cypriots, such as Omorfita/Küçük Kaymaklı, the first houses in the area were built. The first 32 houses built were filled up within 10 days. As the overcrowding continued, new houses continued to be built by the Turkish Cypriot authorities, who opened a brick factory in the area to assist the construction. Within the decade, Göçmenköy saw great urban growth and itself became overcrowded, while a sense of solidarity developed between its inhabitants, named "göçmen" (Turkish for "displaced"). Writer Hüseyin Çakmak claimed that the population of the area at this time was around 5,000. After the 1974 conflict, some people left Göçmenköy for other parts of Northern Cyprus, while others displaced from the south moved in.

After 1974, the area became a culturally active part of North Nicosia, with festivities, a cinema and the increased popularity of the Göçmenköy İdman Yurdu sports club.

== Culture ==
Göçmenköy is home to a number of shops, restaurants, mosques, the Nicosia Protestant Church and three educational institutions: the Göçmenköy Primary School, Bayraktar Middle School and the Bülent Ecevit Anatolian High School (BEAL). It is also home to the Göçmenköy Municipal Park. Along with the neighboring Taşkınköy, it annually hosts the International Göçmenköy-Taşkınköy Festival of Culture and Arts, organized by GÖÇ-TAŞ, the Göçmenköy-Taşkınköy Culture Association. In the festival, folk dance groups from Turkey, Cyprus, and usually several other countries perform and local bands and singers have concerts.

== Sports ==
Göçmenköy İdman Yurdu, founded in 1968, plays in KTFF 1. Lig, the second-highest football division in Northern Cyprus. The quarter is important for the sports life of Northern Cyprus as it hosts the Nicosia Atatürk Sport Complex, which includes the Nicosia Atatürk Stadium, the largest stadium in the island with a capacity of 28,000, home to Çetinkaya and Yenicami, who play in the Süper Lig, the Atatürk Spor Hall, which functions as an arena for basketball, volleyball and handball, the Atatürk Indoor Swimming Pool, where popular swimming competitions are held with Turkish teams also participating, tennis courts and headquarters of the Turkish Cypriots sports federations of several branches. It has also hosted international sports events. Göçmenköy Stadium is another stadium in the quarter, home to Göçmenköy İdman Yurdu.

== Gallery ==
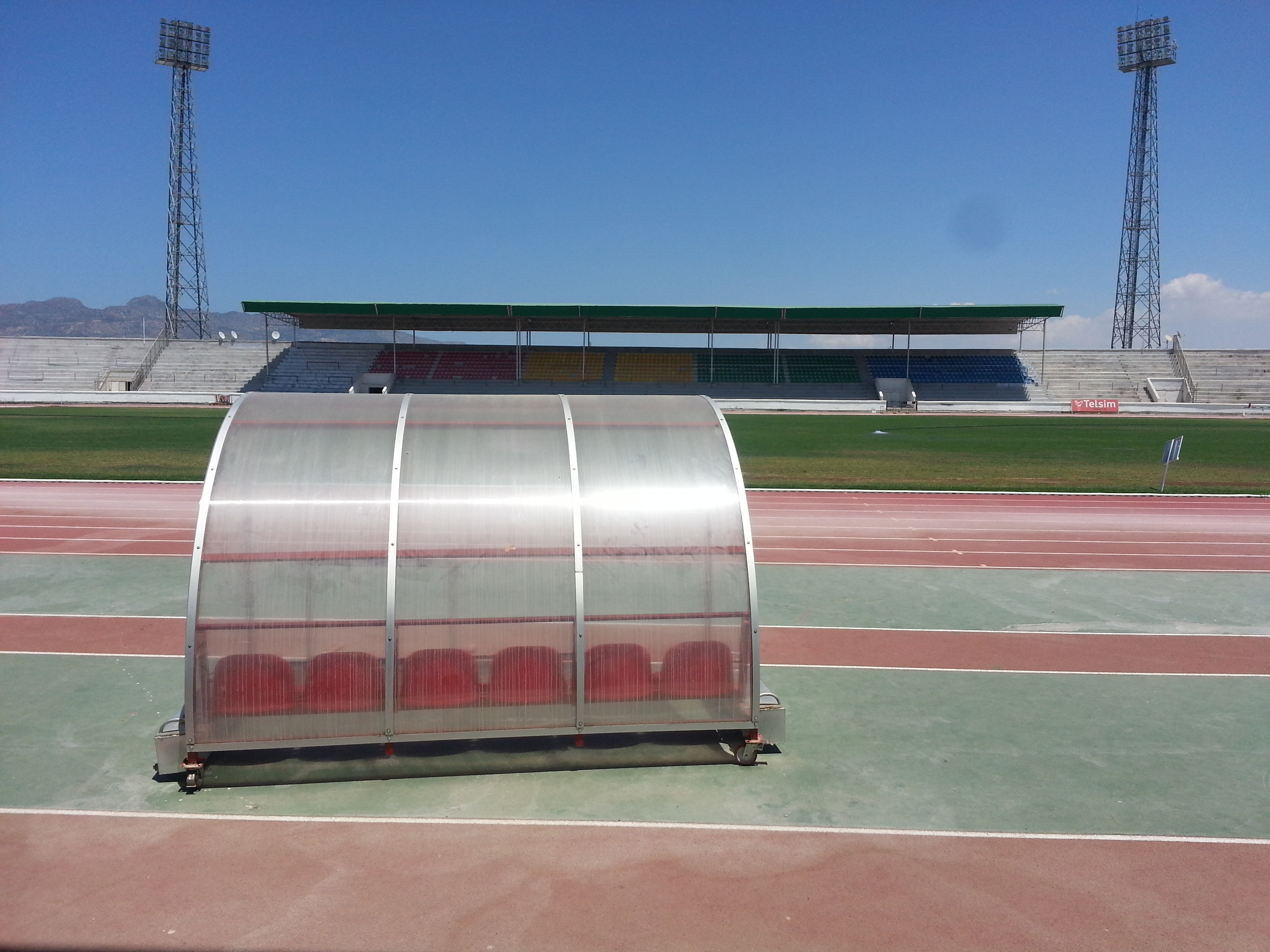
Nicosia Atatürk Stadium

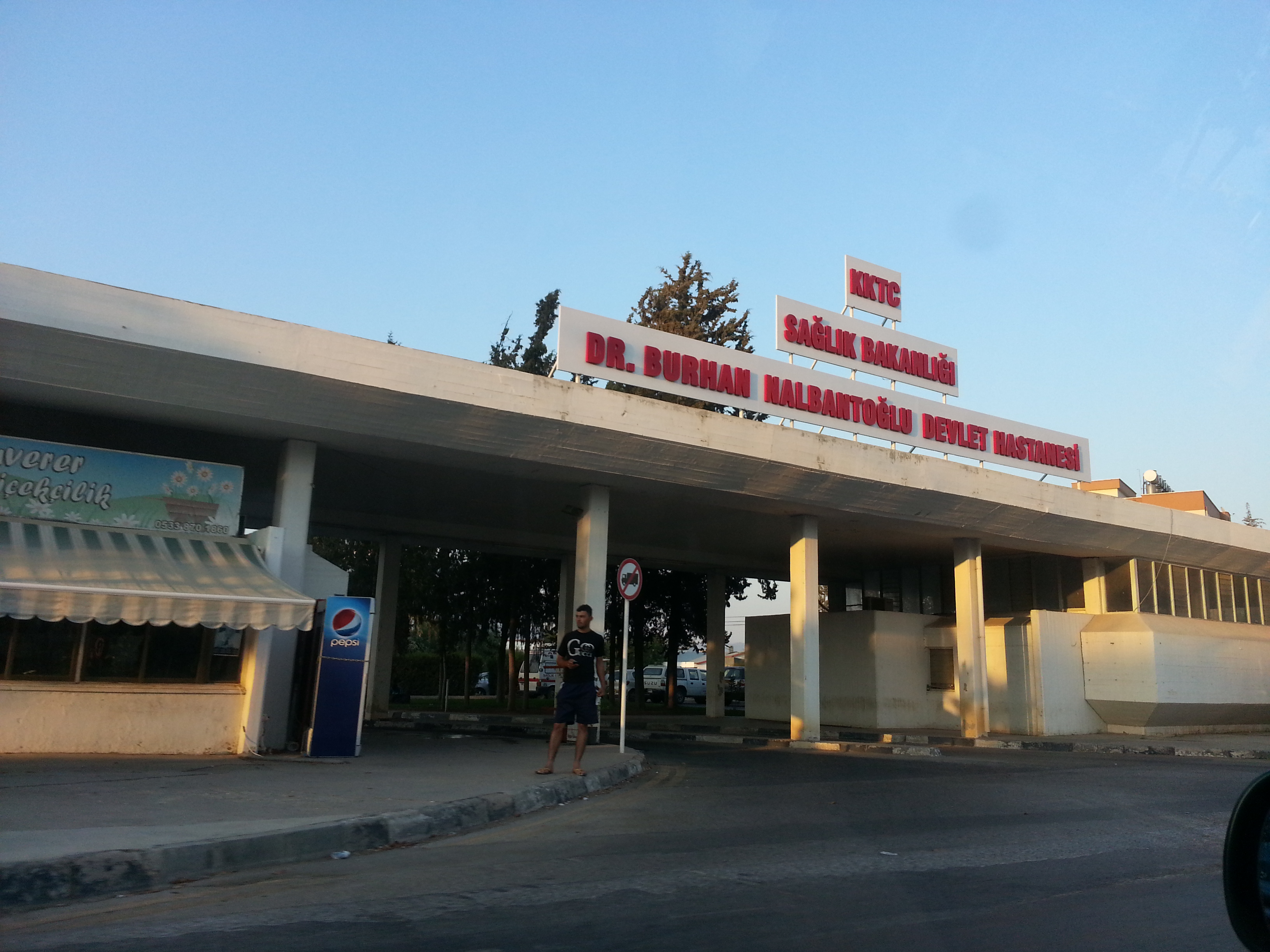
Part of the Nicosia State Hospital is located in Göçmenköy

== See also ==
- Anthoupolis
