= Saqr Ajail =

Iraqi footballer (born 1993)

Personal information
- Full name: Saqr Ajail Saleh Al-Janabi
- Date of birth: 10 July 1993 (age 33)
- Place of birth: Wasit, Iraq
- Height: 1.84 m (6 ft 1/2 in)
- Position: Goalkeeper

Team information
- Current team: Al-Hedood
- Number: 20

Youth career
- 2005–2007: Wasit FC

Senior career*
Years	Team	Apps	(Gls)
2007–2008	Al-Samawa		
2008–2009	Karbalaa		
2009–2011	Al-Quwa Al-Jawiya		
2011–2015	Amanat Baghdad		
2015–2016	Al-Minaa	5	(0)
2016–2017	Amanat Baghdad		
2017–2018	Al-Minaa	13	(0)
2021	Erbil		(0)
2021–	Al-Hedood		(0)

International career^{‡}
2009–2010	Iraq U17		
2011–2013	Iraq U20	3	(0)
2012–2014	Iraq U23	4	(0)
- * Club domestic league appearances and goals as of 12 June 2018 ‡ National team caps and goals as of 19 November 2015

Saqr Ajail Al-Janabi (Arabic: صگر عجيل الجنابي; born 10 July 1993) is an Iraqi footballer who plays as a goalkeeper for Iraq Stars League club Al-Hudood.

== International career ==
In 2009, Saqr started playing for the Iraq U16, and then played for the 2012 AFC U-19 Championship with Iraq U19 and won the runner-up title in this championship.

He was called by coach Hakeem Shaker to play in the 2013 AFC U-22 Championship in Oman and he won the championship title with the team.

On September 15, 2015, Saqr was called by coach Yahya Alwan to play in the 2018 FIFA World Cup qualification.

== Honours ==
Iraq U-19

- 2012 AFC U-19 Championship: runner-up

Iraq U-23

- AFC U-22 Championship: 2013
