= Ali Rahim =

American architect

Ali Rahim is an architect living in the United States. He is a full professor of architecture at the University of Pennsylvania School of Design (PennDesign), and the founding director of the firm Contemporary Architecture Practice in New York City.

== Education ==
Rahim graduated from the Rugby School in Great Britain, received his bachelor's degree from the University of Michigan, and his Master of Architecture from Columbia University in New York, where he was awarded the Honor Award for Excellence in Design and the Kinney Travelling Fellowship for his work.

== Academic career ==
At the University of Pennsylvania, he coordinates the final year curriculum of the design studios for the Master of Architecture program at PennDesign. He has also taught as the Louis I. Kahn Visiting Professor at Yale University School of Architecture, as Zaha Hadid visiting studio professor at the University of Applied Arts (Die Angewandte Kunst) in Vienna, Austria, as visiting professor at the Harvard University Graduate School of Design, and as visiting assistant professor at the University of Michigan College of Architecture and Urban Planning

== Works ==
His work has used design research as a method to develop new techniques for architectural creation that leverage digital resources in design and production.

His work at Contemporary Architecture Practice has spanned from product design, to master planning.

His work has been exhibited at the MOMA in New York and the Serpentine Gallery in London. It has been published in Architectural Design, Architectural Record, The New York Times, Harvard Design Magazine, and the Nikkei newspaper.
