= Mohammed Hatem =

Palestinian fitness influencer (born 2004/5)

- Born: 2004 or 2005 (age 20–21); Palestine
- Other name: Gym Rat in Gaza
- Years active: 2024–present
- Known for: amateur bodybuilder, fitness influencer

Instagram information
- Page: gym_rat_in_gaza
- Years active: 2024–present
- Genre: Fitness culture
- Followers: 410 thousand (4 September 2025)

YouTube information
- Channel: Mohd hatem
- Genre: Fitness culture
- Subscribers: 30.3 thousand (4 September 2025)
- Views: 691 thousand (4 September 2025)

Mohammed Hatem (born 2004 or 2005), also known by his username Gym Rat in Gaza, is a Palestinian fitness influencer, who gained attention by airing English-language videos of himself exercising to become an amateur bodybuilder despite the ongoing Gaza war.

Hatem was a first year college student when his education was interrupted by the 2023 Gaza war, and the destruction of his university and family house. To control what he could, in 2024 Hatem started an Instagram channel documenting his bodybuilding, with what equipment he could get among the rubble. His videos have received international attention, hundreds of thousands of followers and millions of views. In 2025 he began coaching international fitness clients remotely, though due to the Gaza Strip famine cannot himself follow the diet recommendations he gives them.

== Early life ==
Mohammed (or Mohamed) Hatem is a young Palestinian, born 2004 or 2005 (age 20–21), who lives with his parents and two younger brothers in the Gaza Strip. In October 2023, at the start of the Gaza war, Hatem was in his first month at Al-Aqsa University, studying business administration. The war ended that, and the university was later destroyed by the Israeli military.

Hatem had started amateur bodybuilding in 2020, inspired by six-time Mr. Olympia winner Chris Bumstead. After the war began, his routine was scaled back drastically from a daily average of three hours to 30 minutes, and the food shortages cut his weight from 58 kilograms (128 lb) to 53 kilograms (117 lb), which he only gradually regained.

== Gym Rat in Gaza ==
In April 2024, after the Gaza war was in full flow, Hatem launched "Gym Rat in Gaza", an English language Instagram page on which he posted videos of his life during the Israeli invasion, including his workouts attempting to become an amateur bodybuilder despite the scarcity of food and equipment. Frequent internet blackouts made uploading his videos difficult, but he persisted. He says he chose English because many others in Gaza already broadcast in Arabic, and he wanted his audience to be people around the world. He had taught himself English during the 2020 COVID-19 lockdowns. His first videos documented his first 100 days of bodybuilding, and between April and October 2024 he had what Men's Health called an impressive muscle transformation. His audience by November 2024 reached 183,000 people from India, Jordan, Oman, Pakistan, the United Arab Emirates, and the United States. Some of his 150 videos received millions of views. By August 2025, after coverage by international news including Al Jazeera, MSNBC, and NPR, he had 355,000 Instagram followers.

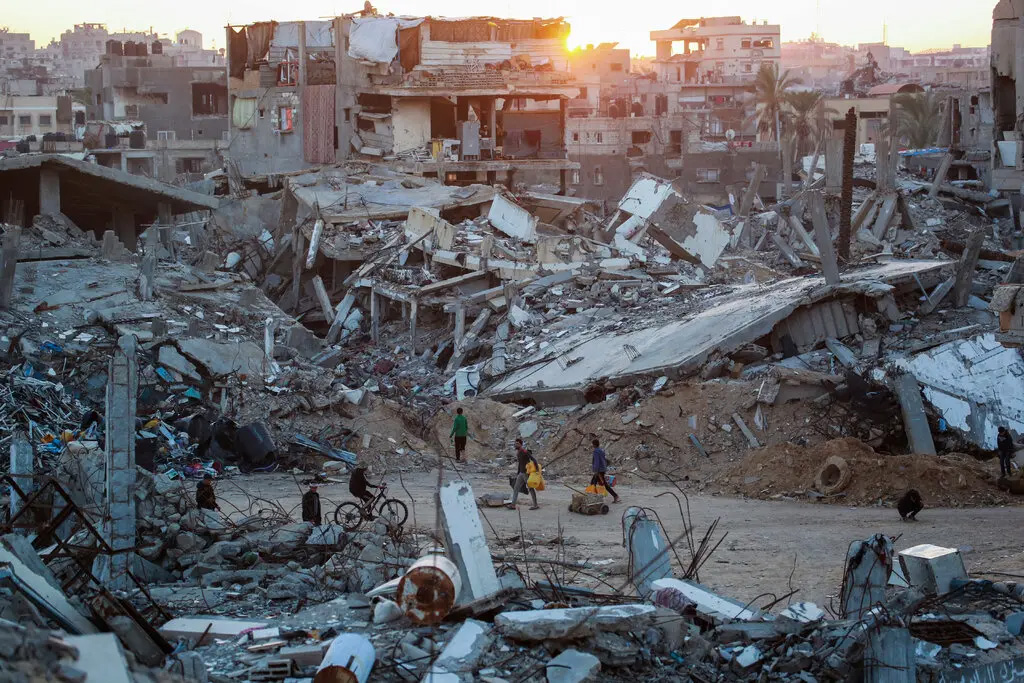
Ruins of Khan Yunis, December 2024, during the Israel-Hamas war

In 2024, Hatem exercised using concrete door ledges for muscle-ups, and weights from water canisters, a car battery, and rubble, in his grandmother's house in Khan Yunis, and commuting to a surviving gym in the center of the city when he could. The war made the most basic tasks, like filling water, charging devices, and getting internet, take much longer. He says whatever time he had left after his daily tasks went into his workout. Hatem's family house was destroyed in the war, a few days before he started his video channel, and by November 2024, he had been displaced 10 times. His close friend and fellow video creator Mohammed Said al-Halimy, who posted about living in a tent and gardening as well as exercising, was killed while trying to get an internet connection at a city cafe. However, Hatem's channel does not focus on deploring his hardships, saying "there are enough stories of tragedy", instead his videos are filled with memes and jokes. For example, he lists among his exercises lifting "30 to 40 buckets of rubble every day", or ironically cites another fitness influencer's video claiming 50% less death risk for taking 10,000 steps daily. He does post links to fundraisers to help his family and other Gazans buy food. He says the one message he hopes viewers get from his videos is to be grateful for what they have, never taking it for granted, and never let circumstances defeat them.

In December 2024 Hatem and his family were allowed to move back into their partly destroyed home in east Khan Yunis, and begin clearing the rubble. They rebuilt the broken walls, and planted a garden for home farming. He also enrolled in online business classes at the University of Palestine. During the January 2025 Gaza war ceasefire, his situation temporarily got better, as his community could receive more aid. After the ceasefire's end in March, he was no longer able to exercise at his gym and had to workout at home, as much as he could given the reduced food he was receiving. In 2025 he started remotely coaching five personal fitness clients, in Australia, France, Germany, Spain, and Switzerland; though as he wryly observed in a May video, he could not himself practice what he taught them, since the Gaza Strip famine means he is generally unable to meet his daily requirements for protein. His diet consisted of small amounts of chickpeas, lentils, rice and bread, and by September his weight was back down to 54 kilograms (119 lb).

By August 2025, Hatem had been again forced to leave his family home, and his grandmother's house had also been destroyed. He and his parents and younger brothers had been displaced a total of 13 times, and were living on the Khan Yunis beach in a tent. Hatem had said before that he wanted to rebuild his homeland, but by September 2025, he only wanted to escape from Gaza.

== Shawqi Hatem ==
Shawqi Hatem is Mohammed's oldest brother, born 2003 or 2004 (age 22–23). He is a software engineering student, and had completed two years of his undergraduate degree when the Gaza war began. He was also the only family member with a valid passport, having gotten one to attend a 2023 hackathon in Qatar, so the family decided he was the most likely to be able to leave the country to help support the family. His father sold the family car to pay for him to cross the Rafah Border Crossing to Egypt, and he arrived in South Africa on 24 March 2024. He does what he can to support those he left behind: his parents, two grandmothers, three younger brothers including Mohammed, his older sister and her husband, including two fundraising campaigns, multiple websites, and a book, A Human But From Gaza.
