= Hicham Ghazia =

Tunisian football coach

Hicham Ghozzia
Personal information
- Date of birth: 07-10-1977
- Place of birth: Tunisia
- Height: 1.83 m (6 ft 0 in)

Team information
- Current team: Chabab Riadhi Belouizdad (Assistant et Préparateur Physique)

Managerial career
- Years: Team
- 2007-2008: Stade tunisien Préparateur Physique
- 2008-2009: ES Hammam Sousse Préparateur Physique
- 2010-2011: Al-Shaab CSC Préparateur Physique
- 2011-2012: ES Hammam Sousse Assistant
- 2012-2013: Olympique Béja assistant
- 2012–2014: Libya Assistant et Préparateur Physique
- 2014–2015: CS Hammam-Lif Assistant
- 2015: Tunisia national football team Préparateur Physique
- 2015-2016: Al-Madina SC Assistant
- 2016: Stade Tunisien Assistant
- 2017: Al-Ittihad Assistant
- 2017–2019: Al-Minaa assistant
- 2019: Al Kharaitiyat SC assistant
- 2019-2024: Tunisia national football team Entraineur nationale, Préparateur Physique
- 2025-2026: CR Belouizdad Assistant et Préparateur Physique

Hicham Ghazia is a professional football coach, fitness trainer, and general coordinator of teams, he started as coach of the CU Bardo 2 women's team in 2005, and currently works as an assistant coach at the Iraqi club Al-Minaa.

== Managerial career ==
Ghazia was assistant coach with Fathi Laabidi for Olympique Béja in 2012, before as a physical trainer at Al-Shaab in the UAE, then assistant coach with Abdul-Hafeedh Arbeesh in the Libya national football team from 2012 to 2013, then assistant coach with Fathi Laabidi for club CS Hammam-Lif from 2014 to 2015, then fitness coach with Maher Kanzari for Stade Tunisien in 2016, and again with Abdul-Hafeedh Arbeesh at the Libyan club Al-Ittihad.

Ghazia moved to Iraq in 2017 to work as a fitness coach for Al-Minaa, then an assistant coach, then a coach in the same club.

=== Managerial statistics ===
As of 25 February 2019

Team	Nat	From	To	Record				
Team	Nat	From	To	G	W	D	L	Win %
Al-Minaa	(Iraq)	7 February 2019	25 February 2019	3	1	0	2	33.33
Total				3	1	0	2	33.33
