= Didier Talla =

Cameroonian footballer

Eugène Talla
Personal information
- Full name: Eugène Didier Talla Nembot
- Date of birth: 8 March 1989 (age 37)
- Place of birth: Cameroon
- Height: 1.77 m (5 ft 10 in)
- Position: Defensive midfielder

Team information
- Current team: Al-Najaf

Senior career*
Years	Team	Apps	(Gls)
2008–2012	Panthère du Ndé		
2012–2013	Salalah		(2)
2013–2017	AS Marsa	102	(7)
2017	Al-Merrikh	17	(2)
2018–2019	Al-Minaa	45	(1)
2019–	Al-Najaf		

International career^{‡}
2015	Cameroon	8	(0)
- * Club domestic league appearances and goals as of 14:12, 20 January 2020 (UTC) ‡ National team caps and goals as of 19 January 2015

Eugène Didier Talla Nembot (born 8 March 1989), or simply Eugène Talla, is a Cameroonian footballer who plays for Al-Najaf FC as a midfielder.

== Honours ==
Panthère du Ndé

- Cameroonian Cup Winner (1): 2009
