= Karrar Ibrahim =

Iraqi footballer (1994–2020)

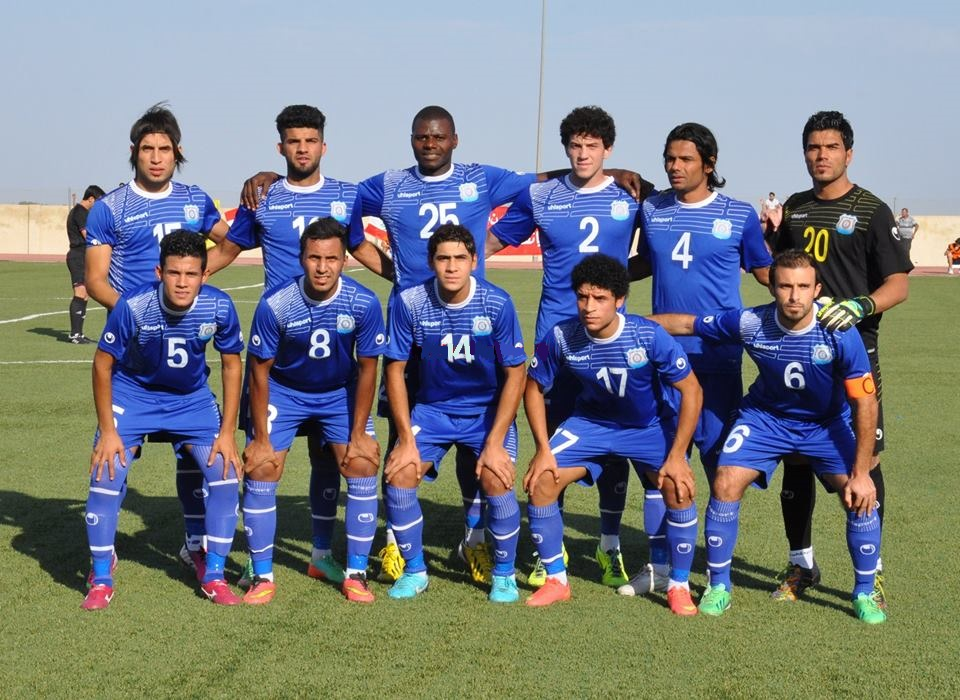
- Karrar Ibrahim with Al-Minaa in 2014

Personal information
- Full name: Karrar Ibrahim Shaker Almusawi
- Date of birth: 19 September 1994
- Place of birth: Basra, Iraq
- Date of death: 9 July 2020 (aged 25)
- Place of death: Baghdad, Iraq
- Height: 1.90 m (6 ft 3 in)
- Position: Goalkeeper

Youth career
- –2009: Al-Minaa

Senior career*
Years	Team	Apps	(Gls)
2009–2017	Al-Minaa	97	(0)
2017–2018	Naft Al-Janoob		(0)
2018–2019	Al-Minaa	13	(0)
2019–2020	Al-Talaba		(0)

International career
2010	Iraq U17		
2011–2013	Iraq U20		
2013–2016	Iraq U23		
2015	Iraq		
- * Club domestic league appearances and goals

Karrar Ibrahim Shaker Almusawi (Arabic: كرار إبراهيم شاكر الموسوي; 19 September 1994 – 9 July 2020) was an Iraqi professional footballer who played as a goalkeeper for the Olympic team in 2016 AFC U-23 Championship.

== Club career ==
Ibrahim started playing football at the Al-Minaa Academy, and was able to win with the Al-Minaa U16 team the Basra Clubs Youth League in 2009.

In September 2009, he was promoted to play with the club's first team. On 22 May 2010, he played his first match in the Iraq Stars League against Al-Hasanain, where he entered as a substitute in the second half, and proved that he is no different from the team's main goalkeeper after he was able to thwart the opponent's striker Hassan Jabbar's one-on-one.

He stayed with the club until 2017, where he appeared in 97 matches, then moved to Naft Al-Janoob for one season. Then he returned to Al-Minaa for another season, and played in 13 matches, after which he moved to Al-Talaba to play for it in the 2019–2020 season.

== International career ==
Ibrahim was first picked to represent Iraq in 2010, when the under-17 coach Adel Nima selected him to be a part of his 23-man squad to play in Arab School Sports Games in Beirut, in which they won the football gams and won gold medals.

He was also selected by the coach Abdul-Ghani Shahad to be part of the 27-man Olympic squad to play in the 2016 AFC U-23 Championship qualifiers for the 2016 Summer Olympics in Rio de Janeiro. On 6 November 2015, coach Yahya Alwan picked him for the Iraq squad for the first time in a match against Chinese Taipei.

== Death ==
On 9 July 2020, the player's dead body was found inside his car in Baghdad, showing signs of strangulation.

Al-Minaa Club suspended its sports activities for three days in mourning for the death of its former goalkeeper and considered his shirt number, 20, as a retired number for posthumous honour. The President of Asian Football Confederation, Salman bin Ibrahim Al Khalifa, issued a statement of condolence about the player.

== Honours ==
Al-Minaa

- Thaghr al-Iraq Championship: 2009
